= List of Premier Volleyball League champion teams =

The Premier Volleyball League (PVL) Finals is the championship series of a PVL conference. The following is a list of all teams that won the title in each conference and their respective rosters.

== List ==
Season	Conference	Team	Roster	Head coach	Ref.
2017	Reinforced	Pocari Sweat Lady Warriors	Gyzelle Sy (c), Shola Alvarez, Jessey de Leon, Melissa Gohing, Sarah Jane Espelita, Jeanette Panaga, Maricar Nepomuceno, Elaine Kasilag, Fille Cayetano, Siemens Desiree Dadang, Gayle Valdez, Myla Pablo; Foreign: (United States) Michelle Strizak, (United States) Krystal Rivers, (Bosnia and Herzegovina) Edina Sellimovic (replaced due to injury)	(Philippines) Rommel Abella	
2017	Open	BaliPure Purest Water Defenders	Jasmine Nabor (c), Grethcel Soltones, Abigail Noval, Tatan Pantone, Gel Cayuna, Aiko Sweet Urdas, Ma. Asuncion Mendiola, Risa Sato, Iris Oliveros, Jorelle Singh, Jerrili Malabanan, Alyssa Eroa	(Philippines) Roger Gorayeb	
2017	Collegiate	NU Lady Bulldogs	Jaja Santiago (c), Jasmine Nabor, Risa Sato, Roma Doromal, Larnie Aberin, Joni Anne Kamille Chavez, Aiko Sweet Urdas, Roselyn Doria, Gayle Rose Valdez, Jorelle Singh, Audrey Kathryn Paran	(Philippines) Raymund Castillo	
2018	Reinforced	Creamline Cool Smashers	Alyssa Valdez (c), Melissa Gohing, Coleen Laurice Bravo, Risa Sato, Ivy Elayne Remulla, Pau Soriano, Jia Morado, Alexine Danielle Cabaños, Jema Galanza, Rizza Mandapat, Michele Gumabao, Kyla Atienza (Libero) Foreign: (Thailand) Kuttika Kaewpin, (United States) Laura Schaudt	(Thailand) Anusorn Bundit	
2018	Collegiate	UP Lady Fighting Maroons	Ayel Estrañero (c), Jaila Marie Atienza, Lorie Bernardo, Maristella Genn Layug, Remelyn Altomea, Nicole Anne Magsarile, Andreanna Pauleen Lagman, Jessma Clarice Ramos, Isa Molde, Marian Alisa Buitre, Aieshalaine Gannaban, Mary Mirgie Bautista, Roselyn Rosier, Marianne Sotomil	(Kenya) Godfrey Okumu	
2018	Open	Creamline Cool Smashers	Alyssa Valdez (c), Jia Morado, Jema Galanza, Risa Sato, Michele Gumabao, Pau Soriano, Melissa Gohing, Fille Cayetano, Paula Maninang, Coleen Laurice Bravo, Jem Nicole Gutierrez, Kyla Atienza, Alexine Danielle Cabaños, Rizza Mandapat	(Thailand) Anusorn Bundit	
2019	Reinforced	Petro Gazz Angels	Cherry Nunag, Djanel Cheng, Jessey de Leon, Stephanie Mercado, Chie Saet, Jeanette Panaga, Maricar Nepomuceno-Baloaloa, Alyssa Gayle Layug, Jonah Sabete, Rica Jane Enclona, Cienne Mary Arielle Cruz, Jovie Prado Foreign: (United States) Janisa Johnson (c), (Cuba) Wilma Salas	(Philippines) Arnold Laniog	
2019	Open	Creamline Cool Smashers	Alyssa Valdez (c), Kyle Negrito, Coleen Laurice Bravo, Heather Anne Guino-o, Risa Sato, Michele Gumabao, Pau Soriano, Kyla Atienza, Jia Morado, Rizza Mandapat, Jema Galanza, Rosemarie Vargas, Melissa Gohing, Fille Cayetano	(Thailand) Anusorn Bundit	
2019	Collegiate	Adamson Lady Falcons	Louie Romero (c), Trisha Genesis, Rizza Cruz, Ceasa Joria Pinar, Shynna Martinez, Antonette Adolfo, Lucille May Almonte, Joanhna Karen Verdeflor, Mary Jane Igao, Cae Lazo, Hannah Nicole Infante, Martina Lucida Aprecio, Gracelchen Ave, Lorence Grace Toring	(Philippines) Lerma Giron	
2020	tournament cancelled due to COVID-19 pandemic				
2021	Open	Chery Tiggo Crossovers	Gyzelle Sy, Jaja Santiago (c), Jasmine Nabor, Marian Alisa Buitre, Arriane Mae Layug, Mylene Paat, Maika Angela Ortiz, Ma. Shaya Adorador, Justine Dorog, Elaine Kasilag, Dindin Santiago-Manabat, Joy Dacoron, Ria Duremdes, Rachel Anne Austero	(Philippines) Aaron Velez	
2022	Open	Creamline Cool Smashers	Alyssa Valdez (c), Kyle Negrito, Risa Sato, Fille Cayetano, Jeanette Panaga, Ella de Jesus, Pau Soriano, Kyla Atienza, Jia de Guzman, Celine Domingo; Rizza Mandapat, Jema Galanza, Rosemarie Vargas, Tots Carlos	(Philippines) Sherwin Meneses	
2022	Invitational	Creamline Cool Smashers	Alyssa Valdez (c), Celine Domingo, Risa Sato, Jeanette Panaga, Michele Gumabao, Ella de Jesus, Lorie Bernardo, Pau Soriano, Kyla Atienza, Jia de Guzman, Fille Cayetano, Kyle Negrito, Rizza Mandapat, Rosemarie Vargas, Jema Galanza, Tots Carlos	(Philippines) Sherwin Meneses	
2022	Reinforced	Petro Gazz Angels	Chie Saet (c), Bang Pineda, Djanel Cheng, Mariella Gabarda, Grethcel Soltones, Seth Marione Rodriguez, Aiza Maizo-Pontillas, Remy Palma, Marian Alisa Buitre, Myla Pablo, MJ Phillips, Cienne Mary Arielle Cruz, Nicole Tiamzon, Jonah Sabete Foreign: (United States) Lindsey Vander Weide	(Philippines) Rald Ricafort	
2023	1st All-Filipino	Creamline Cool Smashers	Alyssa Valdez, Celine Domingo, Risa Sato, Jeanette Panaga, Michele Gumabao, Ella de Jesus, Lorie Bernardo, Pau Soriano, Kyla Atienza, Jia de Guzman (c), Fille Cayetano, Kyle Negrito, Rizza Mandapat, Rosemarie Vargas, Jema Galanza, Tots Carlos	(Philippines) Sherwin Meneses	
2023	Invitational	Kurashiki Ablaze	Kyoka Ohshima (c), Akane Hiraoka, Asaka Tamaru, Ayane Watanabe, Bessho Kaho, Kaoru Takahashi, Mihaya Hata, Miho Kawamura, Momoka Yamashiro, Nana Fujimura, Reina Fujiwara, Saki Tanabe, Saya Taniguchi, Sayaka Tanida, Takio Kokoro, Wako Omura, Yukino Yano	(Japan) Hideo Suzuki	
2023	2nd All-Filipino	Creamline Cool Smashers	Alyssa Valdez (c), Kyle Negrito, Risa Sato, Jeanette Panaga, Michele Gumabao, Ella de Jesus, Lorie Bernardo, Pau Soriano, Kyla Atienza, Bea Bonafe, Rizza Mandapat, Rosemarie Vargas, Tots Carlos, Bernadeth Pons, Mafe Galanza, Jema Galanza	(Philippines) Sherwin Meneses	
2024–25	All-Filipino	Creamline Cool Smashers	Alyssa Valdez (c), Kyle Negrito, Floremel Rodriguez, Risa Sato, Jeanette Panaga, Michele Gumabao, Ella de Jesus, Lorie Bernardo, Pau Soriano, Kyla Atienza, Denden Lazaro-Revilla, Bea de Leon, Bea Bonafe, Rizza Mandapat, Rosemarie Vargas, Tots Carlos, Bernadeth Pons, Mafe Galanza, Jema Galanza	(Philippines) Sherwin Meneses	
2024–25	Reinforced	Creamline Cool Smashers	Alyssa Valdez (c), Kyle Negrito, Floremel Rodriguez, Risa Sato, Jeanette Panaga, Michele Gumabao, Ella de Jesus, Lorie Bernardo, Pau Soriano, Kyla Atienza, Denden Lazaro-Revilla, Bea de Leon, Bea Bonafe, Rizza Mandapat, Rosemarie Vargas, Tots Carlos, Bernadeth Pons, Mafe Galanza, Jema Galanza (NT), Aleiah Gene Torres Foreign: (United States) Erica May Staunton	(Philippines) Sherwin Meneses	
2024–25	Invitational	Creamline Cool Smashers	Alyssa Valdez (c), Kyle Negrito, Floremel Rodriguez, Risa Sato, Jeanette Panaga, Michele Gumabao, Ella de Jesus, Lorie Bernardo, Pau Soriano, Kyla Atienza, Denden Lazaro-Revilla, Bea de Leon, Bea Bonafe, Rizza Mandapat, Rosemarie Vargas, Tots Carlos, Bernadeth Pons, Mafe Galanza, Jema Galanza (NT), Aleiah Gene Torres Foreign: (United States) Erica May Staunton	(Philippines) Sherwin Meneses	
2024–25	All-Filipino	Petro Gazz Angels	Remy Palma (c), Antoinette Adolfo, Donnalyn Paralejas, Joy Dacoron, Ethan Arce, Djanel Cheng, Jellie Tempiatura, Aiza Maizo-Pontillas, Brooke Van Sickle, Kecelyn Galdones, MJ Phillips, Michelle Morente, Myla Pablo, Ranya Musa, Chie Saet, Nicole Tiamzon, Jonah Sabete, Babylove Barbom	(Japan) Koji Tsuzurabara	
2025–26	PVL on Tour	PLDT High Speed Hitters	Kath Arado (c), Maria Nieza Viray, Shiela Mae Kiseo, Mika Reyes, Alleiah Malaluan, Savi Davison, Zen Perolino, Kim Fajardo, Majoy Baron, Kim Kianna Dy, Dell Palomata, Keisha Bedonia, Angelica Legacion, Angelica Alcantara, Jessey de Leon, Jovie Prado	(Philippines) Rald Ricafort	
2025–26	Invitational	PLDT High Speed Hitters	Kath Arado (c), Maria Nieza Viray, Shiela Mae Kiseo, Mika Reyes, Alleiah Malaluan, Savi Davison, Zen Perolino, Kim Fajardo, Majoy Baron, Kim Kianna Dy, Dell Palomata, Keisha Bedonia, Angelica Legacion, Angelica Alcantara, Jessey de Leon, Jovie Prado	(Philippines) Rald Ricafort	
2025–26	Reinforced	Petro Gazz Angels	Remy Palma (c), Antoinette Adolfo, Joy Dacoron, Djanel Cheng, Julyana Tolentino, Jellie Tempiatura, Aiza Maizo-Pontillas, Brooke Van Sickle, MJ Phillips, Myla Pablo, Ranya Musa, Chie Saet, Nicole Tiamzon, Jonah Sabete, Bang Pineda Foreign: (United States) Lindsey Vander Weide	(United States) Gary Van Sickle	

== Most successful players ==
The table below denotes PVL players with at least 15 medals and the highest medal count among all players in total.

Rank	Player	Team(s) played	Years playing in PVL		Gold	Silver	Bronze	Total
Rank	Player	Team(s) played	From	To	Gold	Silver	Bronze	Total
1	Risa Sato	BaliPure Purest Water Defenders (2017); NU Lady Bulldogs (2017); Creamline Cool Smashers (2018–2024); Chery Tiggo Crossovers (2025)	2017	Present	12	4	1	17
1	Alyssa Valdez	Creamline Cool Smashers (2017–present)	2017	Present	10	3	4	17
1	Pau Soriano	Creamline Cool Smashers (2017–present)	2017	Present	10	3	4	17
2	Rizza Mandapat	Creamline Cool Smashers (2017–present)	2017	Present	10	3	3	16
2	Kyla Atienza	FEU Lady Tamaraws (2017); Creamline Cool Smashers (2018–present)	2017	Present	10	4	2	16

== Most successful coaches ==
The table below denotes PVL coaches with at least 3 medals and the highest medal count among all coaches in total.

Rank	Player	Team(s) coached	Years coaching in PVL		Gold	Silver	Bronze	Total
Rank	Player	Team(s) coached	From	To	Gold	Silver	Bronze	Total
1	(Philippines) Sherwin Meneses	Creamline Cool Smashers (2022–present)	2022	Present	7	1	2	10
2	(Thailand) Anusorn Bundit	Ateneo Lady Eagles (2017); Creamline Cool Smashers (2017–2021)	2017	2021	3	2	2	7
3	(Philippines) Rald Ricafort	Petro Gazz Angels (2022); PLDT High Speed Hitters (2023–present)	2022	Present	3	–	–	3
4	(Philippines) Roger Gorayeb	BaliPure Purest Water Defenders (2017); San Sebastian Lady Stags (2017–2019); PayMaya High Flyers (2018); PLDT Home Fibr Power Hitters (2021); Capital1 Solar Spikers (2024–2025)	2017	2025	1	2	–	3
5	(Philippines) Arnold Laniog	Petro Gazz Angels (2019–2021)	2019	2021	1	1	1	3
6	(Philippines) Cesael Delos Santos	Cignal HD Spikers (2021–present)	2021	present	–	2	5	7
