= Premier Volleyball League All-Filipino Conference =

Premier Volleyball League conference

- Current season, competition or edition: 2026–27 Premier Volleyball League All-Filipino Conference
- Sport: Volleyball
- Founded: 2017; 9 years ago
- First season: 2017
- Most recent champion: Creamline (2026)
- Most titles: Creamline (7 titles)

The Premier Volleyball League All-Filipino Conference is one of three active conferences in the Premier Volleyball League (PVL). It is the only conference where only professional players with Filipino citizenship can compete. The conference was previously known as the Open Conference from 2017 to 2022, carrying over from the conference of the same name in the Shakey's V-League. The Open Conference was also held for the PVL's men's division in 2017 before it was split back into Spikers' Turf.

In the professional era, the All-Filipino Conference is scheduled towards the early part of the calendar year. From 2021 to 2024, this meant that the conference would usually be the season-opening conference. Since 2025, following the calendar shift, the All-Filipino Conference became the season-ending conference.

In 2023, the league hosted two All-Filipino Conferences, due to Philippine National Volleyball Federation (PNVF) sanctions restricting the PVL on hosting the intended Reinforced Conference.

The Creamline Cool Smashers are the most recent champions, winning the 2026 All-Filipino Conference. The Creamline Cool Smashers have the most All-Filipino titles with seven.

== Format history ==
In 2017, the Open Conference featured an initial preliminary round, a single round-robin tournament where each team plays all other teams once. The top four teams advance to the knockout rounds, which are all best-of-three series, including the third-place series.

In 2018, the preliminary round shifted to a double round-robin, meaning each team now plays all other teams twice. This change would be reverted back to the single round-robin in 2021.

The 2022 edition saw the first major shift in the conference's format. Teams are now divided into two pools with a single round-robin being played on each pool. The top four teams from each pool advanced to a new quarterfinal round with the top two gaining twice-to-beat advantage. Also added was a new classification round for teams who failed to reach the semifinals.

In 2023, the league once again reverted back to the previous format from 2017 and 2021. In 2024, the semifinals was turned into a round-robin between the top four teams. The top two advance to the finals while the bottom two compete for the bronze medal. If necessary, a one-game playoff would be held should there be a tie for second place.

The 2024–25 edition saw another major overhaul in the format. The preliminary round is followed by a new qualifying round, where teams are paired based on their standings in the prelims. The winning team in each pairing advances to the quarterfinals while the losing teams compete in a new play-in tournament. Those teams are then divided into two pools, with the top team from each advancing to the quarterfinals. All series in the returning quarterfinal round are best-of-three. The semifinals retain the 2024 format. The 2026 edition kept the same progression, but limited the qualifying round to just the top four teams and changed the play-in tournament to utilize the stepladder format.

The 2026–27 edition saw yet another major overhaul. The All-Filipino Conference was split into three series. The first two series utilize the traditional formats, with teams being able to earn points across both series. Those points are used to determine seeding for the third series, a final playoff tournament resembling the 2026 edition's knockout rounds culminating in a season championship.

== Medal table ==
=== Per season ===
Season	Champions	Runners-up	Third place	Details	Ref.
2017	BaliPure Purest Water Defenders	Pocari Sweat Lady Warriors	Creamline Cool Smashers	2017 Open	
2018	Creamline Cool Smashers	Ateneo–Motolite Lady Eagles	BanKo Perlas Spikers	2018 Open	
2019	Creamline Cool Smashers	Petro Gazz Angels	BanKo Perlas Spikers	2019 Open	
2021	Chery Tiggo Crossovers	Creamline Cool Smashers	Petro Gazz Angels	2021 Open	
2022	Creamline Cool Smashers	Petro Gazz Angels	Cignal HD Spikers	2022 Open	
2023	Creamline Cool Smashers	Petro Gazz Angels	F2 Logistics Cargo Movers	2023 First All-Filipino	
2023	Creamline Cool Smashers	Choco Mucho Flying Titans	Cignal HD Spikers	2023 Second All-Filipino	
2024–25	Creamline Cool Smashers	Choco Mucho Flying Titans	Petro Gazz Angels	2024 All-Filipino	
2024–25	Petro Gazz Angels	Creamline Cool Smashers	Akari Chargers	2024–25 All-Filipino	
2025–26	Creamline Cool Smashers	Cignal Super Spikers	PLDT High Speed Hitters	2026 All-Filipino	
2026–27				2026–27 All-Filipino	

=== Per franchise ===
Inactive or former team

Franchise	Gold medal	Silver medal	Bronze medal	Total
Creamline Cool Smashers	7	2	1	10
Petro Gazz Angels	1	3	2	6
BaliPure Purest Water Defenders	1	0	0	1
Chery Tiggo Crossovers	1	0	0	1
Choco Mucho Flying Titans	0	2	0	2
Cignal Super Spikers	0	1	2	3
Ateneo–Motolite Lady Eagles	0	1	0	1
Pocari Sweat Lady Warriors	0	1	0	1
BanKo Perlas Spikers	0	0	2	2
Akari Chargers	0	0	1	1
F2 Logistics Cargo Movers	0	0	1	1
PLDT High Speed Hitters	0	0	1	1
