= 2017 Premier Volleyball League season =

Inaugural season of the Premier Volleyball League

- League: Premier Volleyball League
- Sport: Volleyball
- Duration: April 30 – October 29, 2017
- TV partner: ABS-CBN Sports and Action

Conferences
- Reinforced champions: Pocari
- Reinforced runners-up: BaliPure
- Open champions: BaliPure
- Open runners-up: Pocari
- Collegiate champions: NU
- Collegiate runners-up: FEU

PVL seasons
- ← 2016 (SVL) 2018 →

The 2017 Premier Volleyball League (PVL) season was the first season of the Premier Volleyball League. There were three conferences for this season.

== Reinforced Conference ==
=== Participating teams ===
2017 Premier Volleyball League Reinforced Conference – Women's division
| Abbr. | Team | Affiliation | Head coach | Team captain | Import(s) |
|---|---|---|---|---|---|
| BLP | BaliPure Purest Water Defenders | Balibago Waterworks System, Inc. | (Philippines) Roger Gorayeb | (Philippines) Grethcel Soltones | (United States) Jennifer Brooke Keddy (Thailand) Jeng Bualee |
| CCS | Creamline Cool Smashers | Republic Biscuit Corporation | (Thailand) Tai Bundit | (Philippines) Alyssa Valdez | (United States) Laura Schaudt (Thailand) Kuttika Kaewpin |
| PAF | Philippine Air Force Jet Spikers | Philippine Air Force | (Philippines) Jasper Jimenez | (Philippines) Joy Cases | (Thailand) Patcharee Sangmuang |
| PER | Perlas Spikers | Beach Volleyball Republic | (Philippines) Jerry Yee | (Philippines) Dzi Gervacio | (Brazil) Rupia Inck (Japan) Naoko Hashimoto |
| POC | Pocari Sweat Lady Warriors | Federated Distributors, Inc. | (Philippines) Rommel John Abella | (Philippines) Gyzelle Sy | (Bosnia and Herzegovina) Edina Selimovic (United States) Michelle Strizak (United States) Krystal Rivers |
| PSM | Power Smashers | None | (Philippines) Ernesto Pamilar | (Philippines) Jovie Prado | (Thailand) Amporn Hyapha (Thailand) Kannika Thipachot |

=== Preliminary round ===
| Pos | Team | Pld | W | L | Pts | SW | SL | SR | SPW | SPL | SPR | Qualification |
|---|---|---|---|---|---|---|---|---|---|---|---|---|
| 1 | BaliPure Purest Water Defenders | 10 | 7 | 3 | 21 | 25 | 16 | 1.563 | 919 | 876 | 1.049 | Semifinals |
| 2 | Power Smashers | 10 | 6 | 4 | 17 | 21 | 17 | 1.235 | 859 | 843 | 1.019 | Semifinals |
| 3 | Pocari Sweat Lady Warriors | 10 | 6 | 4 | 17 | 21 | 17 | 1.235 | 814 | 817 | 0.996 | |
| 4 | Perlas Spikers | 10 | 5 | 5 | 16 | 22 | 20 | 1.100 | 921 | 925 | 0.996 | |
| 5 | Creamline Cool Smashers | 10 | 4 | 6 | 14 | 21 | 22 | 0.955 | 944 | 919 | 1.027 | |
| 6 | Philippine Air Force Jet Spikers | 10 | 2 | 8 | 5 | 10 | 28 | 0.357 | 796 | 873 | 0.912 | |

Rules for classification: 3 points = win match in 3 or 4 sets; 2 points = win match in 5 sets; 1 point = lose match in 5 sets; 0 point = lose match in 3 or 4 sets

=== Quarterfinals ===
| Pos | Team | Pld | W | L | Pts | SW | SL | SR | SPW | SPL | SPR | Qualification |
|---|---|---|---|---|---|---|---|---|---|---|---|---|
| 1 | Pocari Sweat Lady Warriors | 3 | 3 | 0 | 7 | 9 | 4 | 2.250 | 284 | 260 | 1.092 | Semifinals |
| 2 | Creamline Cool Smashers | 3 | 2 | 1 | 6 | 8 | 5 | 1.600 | 272 | 253 | 1.075 | Semifinals |
| 3 | Perlas Spikers | 3 | 1 | 2 | 3 | 5 | 8 | 0.625 | 265 | 263 | 1.008 | |
| 4 | Philippine Air Force Jet Spikers | 3 | 0 | 3 | 2 | 4 | 9 | 0.444 | 251 | 296 | 0.848 | |

Rules for classification: 3 points = win match in 3 or 4 sets; 2 points = win match in 5 sets; 1 point = lose match in 5 sets; 0 point = lose match in 3 or 4 sets

=== Final round ===
- All series are best-of-3

Semifinals
1 | BaliPure Purest Water Defenders | 3 | 2 | 3
4 | Creamline Cool Smashers | 1 | 3 | 0
2 | Power Smashers | 2 | 3 | 0
3 | Pocari Sweat Lady Warriors | 3 | 2 | 3

Finals
BaliPure Purest Water Defenders | 1 | 3 | 1
Pocari Sweat Lady Warriors | 3 | 2 | 3
3rd place
Creamline Cool Smashers | 3 | 3 | –
Power Smashers | 0 | 1 | –

=== Final standings ===
| Rank | Women's |
|---|---|
| 1st place, gold medalist(s) | Pocari Sweat Lady Warriors |
| 2nd place, silver medalist(s) | BaliPure Purest Water Defenders |
| 3rd place, bronze medalist(s) | Creamline Cool Smashers |
| 4 | Power Smashers |
| 5 | Perlas Spikers |
| 6 | Philippine Air Force Jet Spikers |

=== Awards ===
| Award | | Name |
|---|---|---|
| Most Valuable Player | Finals: Conference: | (Philippines) Myla Pablo (Pocari Sweat) (Philippines) Alyssa Valdez (Creamline) |
| Best Setter | | (Philippines) Jasmine Nabor (BaliPure) |
| Best Outside Spiker | 1st: 2nd: | (Philippines) Alyssa Valdez (Creamline) (Philippines) Grethcel Soltones (BaliPure) |
| Best Middle Blocker | 1st: 2nd: | (Philippines) Risa Sato (BaliPure) (Philippines) Jeanette Panaga (Pocari Sweat) |
| Best Opposite Spiker | | (Philippines) Dimdim Pacres (Power Smashers) |
| Best Libero | | (Philippines) Melissa Gohing (Pocari Sweat) |
| Best Import | | (United States) Michelle Strizak (Pocari Sweat) |

== Open Conference ==
=== Participating teams ===
Premier Volleyball League 1st Season Open Conference (Women's Division)
| Abbr. | Team | Company | Head coach | Team captain |
|---|---|---|---|---|
| ADU | Adamson–Akari Lady Falcons | Adamson University / Akari Lighting & Technology Corporation (sponsor) | (United States) Airess Padda | Jema Galanza |
| BLP | BaliPure Purest Water Defenders | Balibago Waterworks System, Inc. | (Philippines) Roger Gorayeb | Jasmine Nabor |
| CCS | Creamline Cool Smashers | Republic Biscuit Corporation | (Thailand) Tai Bundit | Alyssa Valdez |
| PAF | Hair Fairy Air Force Jet Spikers | Philippine Air Force / Hair Fairy Dry Shampoo (sponsor) | (Philippines) Jasper Jimenez | Joy Cases |
| PER | BanKo Perlas Spikers | Beach Volleyball Republic / BPI Direct BanKo, Inc. (sponsor) | (Thailand) Matinai Muhammad | Sue Roces |
| POC | Pocari Sweat Lady Warriors | Federated Distributors, Inc. | (Philippines) Rico de Guzman | Gyzelle Sy |
| PSM | Power Smashers | Bristol | (Philippines) Ernesto Pamilar | Jovie Prado |
| UP | UP Fighting Lady Maroons | University of the Philippines | (Philippines) Jerry Yee | Tots Carlos |

=== Preliminary round ===
| Pos | Team | Pld | W | L | Pts | SW | SL | SR | SPW | SPL | SPR | Qualification |
|---|---|---|---|---|---|---|---|---|---|---|---|---|
| 1 | Creamline Cool Smashers | 7 | 7 | 0 | 20 | 21 | 7 | 3.000 | 669 | 593 | 1.128 | Semifinals |
| 2 | Pocari Sweat Lady Warriors | 7 | 5 | 2 | 14 | 16 | 10 | 1.600 | 596 | 564 | 1.057 | Semifinals |
| 3 | Philippine Air Force Jet Spikers | 7 | 5 | 2 | 13 | 16 | 11 | 1.455 | 588 | 598 | 0.983 | Semifinals |
| 4 | BaliPure Purest Water Defenders | 7 | 4 | 3 | 13 | 17 | 12 | 1.417 | 646 | 620 | 1.042 | Semifinals |
| 5 | BanKo Perlas Spikers | 7 | 3 | 4 | 9 | 14 | 16 | 0.875 | 683 | 658 | 1.038 | |
| 6 | UP Lady Maroons | 7 | 2 | 5 | 6 | 10 | 18 | 0.556 | 614 | 631 | 0.973 | |
| 7 | Power Smashers | 7 | 1 | 6 | 6 | 12 | 20 | 0.600 | 654 | 707 | 0.925 | |
| 8 | Adamson Lady Falcons | 7 | 1 | 6 | 3 | 7 | 19 | 0.368 | 539 | 618 | 0.872 | |

Rules for classification: 3 points = win match in 3 or 4 sets; 2 points = win match in 5 sets; 1 point = lose match in 5 sets; 0 point = lose match in 3 or 4 sets

=== Final round ===
- All series are best-of-3

Semifinals
1 | Creamline Cool Smashers | 3 | 2 | 0
4 | BaliPure Purest Water Defenders | 2 | 3 | 3
2 | Pocari Sweat Lady Warriors | 0 | 3 | 3
3 | Philippine Air Force Jet Spikers | 3 | 2 | 2

Finals
BaliPure Purest Water Defenders | 3 | 3
Pocari Sweat Lady Warriors | 0 | 1
3rd place
Creamline Cool Smashers | 3 | 3
Philippine Air Force Jet Spikers | 0 | 1

=== Final standings ===
| Rank | Women's |
|---|---|
| 1st place, gold medalist(s) | BaliPure Purest Water Defenders |
| 2nd place, silver medalist(s) | Pocari Sweat Lady Warriors |
| 3rd place, bronze medalist(s) | Creamline Cool Smashers |
| 4 | Philippine Air Force Jet Spikers |
| 5 | BanKo Perlas Spikers |
| 6 | UP Lady Maroons |
| 7 | Power Smashers |
| 8 | Adamson Lady Falcons |

=== Awards ===
| Award | | Name |
|---|---|---|
| Most Valuable Player | Finals: Conference: | Grethcel Soltones (BaliPure); Myla Pablo (Pocari) |
| Best Setter | | Julia Melissa Morado (Creamline) |
| Best Outside Spiker | 1st: 2nd: | Myla Pablo (Pocari); Grethcel Soltones (BaliPure) |
| Best Middle Blocker | 1st: 2nd: | Jeanette Panaga (Pocari); Risa Sato (BaliPure) |
| Best Opposite Spiker | | Iari Yongco (Air Force) |
| Best Libero | | Melissa Gohing (Pocari) |

== Collegiate Conference ==
=== Participating teams ===
Premier Volleyball League 1st Season Collegiate Conference (Women's Division)
| Abbr. | Team | Head coach | Team captain |
|---|---|---|---|
| ADU | Adamson Lady Falcons | (United States) Airess Padda | Jema Galanza |
| AUN | Arellano Lady Chiefs | (Philippines) Roberto "Obet" Javier | Jovie Prado |
| ADM | Ateneo Lady Eagles | (Thailand) Tai Bundit | Bea de Leon |
| CSB | Benilde Lady Blazers | (Philippines) Michael Cariño | Klarissa Abriam |
| FEU | FEU Lady Tamaraws | (Philippines) George Pascua | Bernadeth Pons |
| JRU | JRU Lady Bombers | (Philippines) Mia Tioseco | Shola Alvarez |
| LPU | Lyceum Lady Pirates | (Philippines) Emil Lontoc | Cherilyn Sindayen |
| NUI | NU Lady Bulldogs | (Philippines) Babes Castillo | Jaja Santiago |
| SBC | San Beda Red Lionesses | (Philippines) Nemesio Gavino | Rebecca Cuevas |
| SSC | San Sebastian Lady Stags | (Philippines) Roger Gorayeb | Joyce Santa Rita |
| TIP | TIP Lady Engineers | (Philippines) Achilles "Boy" Paril | Alexandra Rosales |
| UPD | UP Lady Maroons | (Philippines) Jerry Yee | Tots Carlos |

=== Preliminary round ===
| Pos | Team | Pld | W | L | Pts | SW | SL | SR | SPW | SPL | SPR | Qualification |
|---|---|---|---|---|---|---|---|---|---|---|---|---|
| 1 | NU Lady Bulldogs | 5 | 5 | 0 | 15 | 15 | 3 | 5.000 | 438 | 355 | 1.234 | Semifinals |
| 2 | FEU Lady Tamaraws | 5 | 4 | 1 | 12 | 13 | 5 | 2.600 | 441 | 373 | 1.182 | Semifinals |
| 3 | Ateneo Lady Eagles | 5 | 3 | 2 | 9 | 11 | 6 | 1.833 | 391 | 327 | 1.196 | |
| 4 | San Sebastian Lady Stags | 5 | 2 | 3 | 6 | 7 | 10 | 0.700 | 338 | 392 | 0.862 | |
| 5 | Lyceum Lady Pirates | 5 | 1 | 4 | 3 | 5 | 13 | 0.385 | 379 | 426 | 0.890 | |
| 6 | JRU Lady Bombers | 5 | 0 | 5 | 0 | 1 | 15 | 0.067 | 288 | 402 | 0.716 | |

Rules for classification: 3 points = win match in 3 or 4 sets; 2 points = win match in 5 sets; 1 point = lose match in 5 sets; 0 point = lose match in 3 or 4 sets

| Pos | Team | Pld | W | L | Pts | SW | SL | SR | SPW | SPL | SPR | Qualification |
|---|---|---|---|---|---|---|---|---|---|---|---|---|
| 1 | Adamson Lady Falcons | 5 | 5 | 0 | 13 | 15 | 4 | 3.750 | 434 | 352 | 1.233 | Semifinals |
| 2 | Arellano Lady Chiefs | 5 | 4 | 1 | 11 | 12 | 5 | 2.400 | 402 | 335 | 1.200 | Semifinals |
| 3 | UP Lady Maroons | 5 | 3 | 2 | 11 | 13 | 6 | 2.167 | 415 | 368 | 1.128 | |
| 4 | San Beda Red Lionesses | 5 | 2 | 3 | 7 | 8 | 11 | 0.727 | 408 | 417 | 0.978 | |
| 5 | Benilde Lady Blazers | 5 | 1 | 4 | 3 | 4 | 13 | 0.308 | 347 | 405 | 0.857 | |
| 6 | TIP Lady Engineers | 5 | 0 | 5 | 0 | 2 | 15 | 0.133 | 289 | 418 | 0.691 | |

Rules for classification: 3 points = win match in 3 or 4 sets; 2 points = win match in 5 sets; 1 point = lose match in 5 sets; 0 point = lose match in 3 or 4 sets

=== Final round ===
- All series are best-of-3

Semifinals
1A | NU Lady Bulldogs | 3 | 3
2B | Arellano Lady Chiefs | 0 | 2
1B | Adamson Lady Falcons | 3 | 2 | 1
2A | FEU Lady Tamaraws | 2 | 3 | 3

Finals
FEU Lady Tamaraws | 1 | 1
NU Lady Bulldogs | 3 | 3
3rd place
Adamson Lady Falcons | 0 | 1
Arellano Lady Chiefs | 3 | 3

=== Final standings ===
| Rank | Team |
|---|---|
| 1st place, gold medalist(s) | NU Lady Bulldogs |
| 2nd place, silver medalist(s) | FEU Lady Tamaraws |
| 3rd place, bronze medalist(s) | Arellano Lady Chiefs |
| 4 | Adamson Lady Falcons |
| 5 | UP Lady Maroons |
| 6 | Ateneo Lady Eagles |
| 7 | San Beda Red Lionesses |
| 8 | San Sebastian Lady Stags |
| 9 | Lyceum Lady Pirates |
| 10 | Benilde Lady Blazers |
| 11 | TIP Lady Engineers |
| 12 | JRU Lady Bombers |

=== Awards ===
| Award | | Name |
|---|---|---|
| Most Valuable Player | Finals: Conference: | Jasmine Nabor (NU); Jaja Santiago (NU) |
| Best Setter | | Rhea Marist Ramirez (Arellano) |
| Best Outside Spiker | 1st: 2nd: | Eli Soyud (Adamson); Regine Anne Arocha (Arellano) |
| Best Middle Blocker | 1st: 2nd: | Jeanette Villareal (FEU); Risa Sato (NU) |
| Best Opposite Spiker | | Toni Basas (FEU) |
| Best Libero | | Gayle Rose Valdez (NU) |

== PVL on Tour ==
The Premier Volleyball League's "PVL on Tour" staged by Sports Vision and Grid Athletic Sports, organizer of the Beach Volleyball Republic, the October tour of the PVL marks the first time ever in its storied history that Sports Vision is bringing its games to the countryside. Matches were held in the People's Gym in Tuguegarao, Batangas City Sports Complex, Iloilo Sports Complex, La Salle Coliseum in Bacolod, and Santa Rosa Sports Complex.

== Conference Results ==
| Conference | Champion | Runner-up | 3rd | 4th | 5th | 6th | 7th | 8th | 9th | 10th | 11th | 12th |
|---|---|---|---|---|---|---|---|---|---|---|---|---|
| Reinforced | Pocari | BaliPure | Creamline | Power | Perlas | Air Force | —N/a | | | | | |
| Open | BaliPure | Pocari | Creamline | Air Force | Perlas | UP | Power | Adamson | —N/a | | | |
| Collegiate | NU | FEU | Arellano | Adamson | UP | Ateneo | San Beda | San Sebastian | Lyceum | Benilde | TIP | JRU |

== All-Star Game ==
At the end of the season and the 2017 Premier Volleyball League on Tour, the league hosted an all-star exhibition match on October 29, 2017 at the Filoil Flying V Centre in San Juan.
