= Pau Soriano =

Filipino volleyball player (born 1991)

Personal information
- Full name: Maria Paulina Soriano
- Born: December 31, 1991 (age 34); Quezon City, Philippines
- Height: 5 ft 7 in (1.70 m)
- Weight: 62 kg (137 lb)
- Spike: 270 cm (110 in)
- Block: 257 cm (101 in)

Volleyball information
- Position: Middle Blocker
- Current club: Creamline Cool Smashers
- Number: 10

Career
Years	Teams
2013	PLDT
2013	Cagayan Valley
2015	Philippine Navy
2016	F2 Logistics
2016	Standard Insurance
2016	Bureau of Customs
2017–2025	Creamline

National team
2013, 2022	Philippines

Maria Paulina "Pau" Soriano is a Filipino volleyball player who last played for the Creamline Cool Smashers of the Premier Volleyball League (PVL).

== Personal life ==
Soriano went to Tandang Sora Elementary School in Banlat, Quezon City and the Ernesto Rondon High School. She is a graduate of Hospitality Management from Adamson University.

== Career ==
During her collegiate years she played with Adamson Lady Falcons from 2008 to 2012 and was team captain from 2011 to 2012 and playing as its quick hitter or middle blocker.

Soriano played with Cagayan Valley Lady Rising Suns from 2013 to 2015. She played the 2013 Shakey's V-League All-Star game.

While having one-year contract with the Philippine Super Liga, she was given a one-year ban and a ₱50,000 fine for playing with the Shakey's V-League club Bureau of Customs Transformers instead of the Standard Insurance-Navy Corvettes from the Philippine Super Liga.

== Clubs ==
- (Philippines) PLDT myDSL Speed Boosters (2013)
- (Philippines) Cagayan Valley Lady Rising Suns (2013–2015)
- (Philippines) Philippine Navy Lady Sailors (2015)
- (Philippines) F2 Logistics Cargo Movers (2016)
- (Philippines) Standard Insurance-Navy Corvettes (2016)
- (Philippines) Bureau of Customs Transformers (2016)
- (Philippines) Creamline Cool Smashers (2017)

== Awards ==
=== Individual ===
- UAAP Season 72 "Best Attacker"
- Shakey's V-League 6th Season, 2nd Conference "Best Blocker"
- Shakey's V-League 7th Season, 2nd Conference "Best Blocker"
- Shakey's V-League 11th Season, 1st Conference "Best Attacker"
- 2013 PSL Invitational Conference "Best Scorer"

=== Club ===
- 2016 Shakey's V-League 13th Season Reinforced Open Conference – Runner-up, with Bureau of Customs Transformers
- 2017 Premier Volleyball League 1st Season Reinforced Open Conference – Third place, with Creamline Cool Smashers
- 2017 Premier Volleyball League 1st Season Open Conference – Third place, with Creamline Cool Smashers
- 2018 Premier Volleyball League Reinforced Conference – Champion, with Creamline Cool Smashers
- 2021 Premier Volleyball League Open Conference – Runner-up with Creamline Cool Smashers
- 2022 Premier Volleyball League Open Conference – Champion, with Creamline Cool Smashers
- 2022 Premier Volleyball League Invitational Conference – Champion, with Creamline Cool Smashers
- 2022 Premier Volleyball League Reinforced Conference - Third place, with Creamline Cool Smashers
- 2023 Premier Volleyball League All-Filipino Conference – Champion, with Creamline Cool Smashers
- 2023 Premier Volleyball League Invitational Conference – Runner-up, with Creamline Cool Smashers
- 2023 Premier Volleyball League Second All-Filipino Conference – Champion, with Creamline Cool Smashers
- 2024 Premier Volleyball League All-Filipino Conference – Champion, with Creamline Cool Smashers
- 2024 Premier Volleyball League Reinforced Conference – Champion, with Creamline Cool Smashers
- 2024 Premier Volleyball League Invitational Conference – Champion, with Creamline Cool Smashers
