= Rosemarie Vargas =

Filipino volleyball player (born 1992)

Rose Vargas
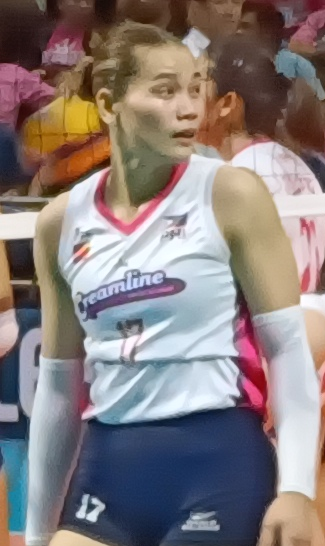
- Vargas in 2025

Personal information
- Full name: Rosemarie Vargas
- Born: December 12, 1992 (age 33); Olongapo, Philippines
- Height: 170 cm (5 ft 7 in)
- Weight: 72 kg (159 lb)
- Education: Far Eastern University

Volleyball information
- Position: Outside hitter
- Current club: Creamline Cool Smashers
- Number: 17

Career
| Years | Teams |
|---|---|
| 2012–2015 | Cagayan Valley |
| 2016 | Pocari Sweat |
| 2016 | Bureau of Customs |
| 2017–present | Creamline Cool Smashers |

Rosemarie Vargas is a Filipino professional volleyball player who is an outside hitter for the Creamline Cool Smashers of the Premier Volleyball League (PVL).

== Personal life ==
Vargas was born on Olongapo City, Zambales on December 12, 1992. She took a degree in Education at Far Eastern University and finished it at 2013.

== Career ==
Because of her power to hit the wall using her hands, her friends saw a potential on her as a volleyball player. Vargas was recruited by former FEU Lady Tamaraws volleyball team coach Nestor Pamilar. After being recruited as a varsity volleyball player of the university, she became part of Far Eastern University women's volleyball team. Vargas debuted as a Lady Tamaraws in UAAP Season 72.

Vargas won the Best Scorer award in the UAAP Season 74 volleyball tournaments. She did not finish her five playing years in the UAAP. She played for the powerhouse team Cagayan Valley Lady Rising Suns in 2013 that won the championships of 2013 open conference and 2014 reinforced conference, and runners-up finish in the Shakey's V-League.

After the team Cagayan was dissolved, she transferred to Pocari Sweat Lady Warriors in 2016 and played in the Shakey's V-League 13th Season Open Conference that won the championship.

Because of lack of playing time in the Pocari Sweat Lady Warriors, Vargas decided to change team to Bureau of Customs Transformers. She and Alyssa Valdez led the team on bringing a podium finish to the team.

From 2017 up to now, she is playing for the Creamline Cool Smashers. Her team finished two bronze medal in the 2017 PVL Season. Vargas was expected to return in the UAAP volleyball court to continue her last playing year for the Far Eastern University.

== Awards ==
=== Individuals ===
- UAAP Season 74 "Best scorer"

=== Club ===
- 2013 Shakey's V-League Open Conference – Champions, with Cagayan Valley Lady Rising Suns
- 2016 Shakey's V-League Open Conference – Champions, with Pocari Sweat Lady Warriors
- 2016 Shakey's V-League Reinforced Open Conference – Silver medal, with Bureau of Customs Transformers
- 2017 Premier Volleyball League Reinforced Conference – Bronze medal, with Creamline Cool Smashers
- 2017 Premier Volleyball League Open Conference – Bronze medal, with Creamline Cool Smashers
- 2019 Premier Volleyball League Reinforced Conference – Runner-up, with Creamline Cool Smashers
- 2019 Premier Volleyball League Open Conference – Champions, with Creamline Cool Smashers
- 2021 Premier Volleyball League Open Conference – Runner-up with Creamline Cool Smashers
- 2022 Premier Volleyball League Open Conference – Champions, with Creamline Cool Smashers
- 2022 Premier Volleyball League Invitational Conference – Champions, with Creamline Cool Smashers
- 2022 Premier Volleyball League Reinforced Conference – Bronze medal, with Creamline Cool Smashers
- 2023 Premier Volleyball League First All-Filipino Conference – Champions, with Creamline Cool Smashers
- 2023 Premier Volleyball League Invitational Conference – Runner-up, with Creamline Cool Smashers
- 2023 Premier Volleyball League Second All-Filipino Conference – Champions, with Creamline Cool Smashers
- 2024 Premier Volleyball League All-Filipino Conference – Champions, with Creamline Cool Smashers
- 2024 Premier Volleyball League Reinforced Conference – Champions, with Creamline Cool Smashers
