= Kanjana Kuthaisong =

Thai volleyball player

Personal information
- Full name: Kanjana Kuthaisong
- Nickname: Som
- Born: 14 April 1997 (age 29)
- Height: 1.71 m (5 ft 7 in)
- Weight: 58 kg (128 lb)

Volleyball information
- Position: Outside hitter
- Current club: King-bangkok
- Number: 16

Kanjana Kuthaisong (Thai: กาญจนา กุไธสง, born April 14, 1997) is a female Thai professional volleyball player.

== Career ==
She played the 2016 Filipino league Shakey's V-League where with Bureau of Customs. They won the silver medal, after losing the final to Pocari Sweat Team.

Kuthaisong played the 2017 season with the Thai club 3BB Nakornnont, playing as an outside spiker.

== Clubs ==
- (Philippines) Bureau of Customs Transformers (2016)
- (Thailand) 3BB Nakornnont (2016–2018)
- (Thailand) King-bangkok (2019–present)
- (Philippines) Generika-Ayala Lifesavers (2019)
- (Vietnam) Vietinbank VC (2022–2023)

== Awards ==
=== Clubs ===
- 2016 Shakey's V-League - Runner-Up, with Bureau of Customs Transformers
- 2017 Thai-Denmark Super League - Bronze medal, with 3BB Nakornnont
- 2018 Thai-Denmark Super League - Bronze medal, with 3BB Nakornnont
- 2023 Asian Club Championship – Runner-up, with Diamond Food–Fine Chef
