= Rizza Mandapat =

Filipino volleyball player (born 1994)

Personal information
- Nationality: Filipino
- Born: Rizza Jane Mandapat; February 28, 1994 (age 32); Buruanga, Aklan, Philippines
- Height: 1.73 m (5 ft 8 in)
- Education: National University

Volleyball information
- Position: Opposite hitter
- Current club: Creamline Cool Smashers
- Number: 16

Career
Years	Teams
2015	Shopinas.com
2015	Bureau of Customs
2016	Cignal
2017–2025	Creamline

National team
2022	Philippines

Rizza Jane Villasis Mandapat (born February 28, 1994) is a Filipino volleyball player who last played for the Creamline Cool Smashers of the Premier Volleyball League (PVL).

== Clubs ==
- (Philippines) Shopinas.com Lady Clickers (2015)
- (Philippines) Bureau of Customs Transformers (volleyball) (2015)
- (Philippines) Cignal HD Spikers (2016)
- (Philippines) Creamline Cool Smashers (2017–2025)

== Awards ==
=== Collegiate ===
Year	League	Season/Conference	Title	Ref
2013	UAAP	76	3rd place	
2013	SVL	1st	Champions	
2014	SVL	1st	Runner-up	
2014	UAAP	77	3rd place	
2015	SVL	Collegiate	Champions	

=== Clubs ===
Year	League	Conference	Club	Title	Ref
2015	PSL	All-Filipino	Shopinas.com Lady Clickers	Runner-up	
2016	SVL	Reinforced	Bureau of Customs Transformers	Runner-up	
2019	PVL	Reinforced	Creamline Cool Smashers	Runner-up	
2019	PVL	Open	Creamline Cool Smashers	Champions	
2021	PVL	Open	Creamline Cool Smashers	Runner-up	
2022	PVL	Open	Creamline Cool Smashers	Champions	
2022	PVL	Invitational	Creamline Cool Smashers	Champions	
2022	PVL	Reinforced	Creamline Cool Smashers	3rd Place	
2023	PVL	1st All-Filipino	Creamline Cool Smashers	Champions	
2023	PVL	Invitational	Creamline Cool Smashers	Runner-up	
2023	PVL	2nd All-Filipino	Creamline Cool Smashers	Champions	
2024	PVL	All-Filipino	Creamline Cool Smashers	Champions	
2024	PVL	Reinforced	Creamline Cool Smashers	Champions	
2024	PVL	Invitational	Creamline Cool Smashers	Champions	
2024–25	PVL	All-Filipino	Creamline Cool Smashers	Runner-up	
2025	PVL	on Tour	Creamline Cool Smashers	Bronze	
2025	PVL	Invitational	Creamline Cool Smashers	Bronze	
