= Gyzelle Sy =

Filipino volleyball player (born 1992)

Personal information
- Full name: Gyzelle Sy
- Nationality: Filipino
- Born: August 21, 1992 (age 34)
- Height: 1.65 m (5 ft 5 in)
- Education: Far Eastern University

Volleyball information
- Position: Setter
- Number: 12

Gyzelle Sy (born August 21, 1992) is a Filipino volleyball player who last played for the Cignal Super Spikers of the Premier Volleyball League (PVL). Sy played for the FEU Lady Tamaraws collegiate women's University team.

== Career ==
=== Collegiate ===
Sy made her first game appearance with the FEU Lady Tamaraws in UAAP Season 73, where her team placed 6th.

In UAAP Season 74, her team placed 4th. She was also awarded Best Setter on that year.

In UAAP Season 78, it was her final year playing for the FEU Lady Tamaraws, where her team placed 3rd.

== Clubs ==
- (Philippines) Philips Gold Lady Slammers (2015)
- (Philippines) Pocari Sweat Lady Warriors (2016–2017)
- (Philippines) Foton Tornadoes (2018–2019)
- (Philippines) Chery Tiggo Crossovers (2020–2021)
- (Philippines) Imus City-AJAA Lady Spikers (2022)
- (Philippines) Cignal HD Spikers (2023–2026)

== Awards ==
=== Individual ===
| Year | League | Season/Conference | Award | Ref |
|---|---|---|---|---|
| 2011 | UAAP | 74 | Best Setter | |
| 2022 | PNVF | Champions League | Best Setter | |

=== Clubs ===
| Year | League | Conference | Club | Title | Ref |
|---|---|---|---|---|---|
| 2015 | PSL | Grand Prix | Philips Gold Lady Slammers | 3rd place | |
| 2016 | SVL | Open | Pocari Sweat Lady Warriors | Champion | |
| 2016 | SVL | Reinforced | Pocari Sweat Lady Warriors | Champion | |
| 2017 | PVL | Reinforced | Pocari Sweat Lady Warriors | Champion | |
| 2017 | PVL | Open | Pocari Sweat Lady Warriors | Runner-up | |
| 2021 | PVL | Open | Chery Tiggo Crossovers | Champion | |
| 2023 | PVL | Invitational | Cignal HD Spikers | 3rd place | |
| 2023 | PVL | 2nd All-Filipino | Cignal HD Spikers | 3rd place | |
| 2024 | PNVF | Champions League | Cignal HD Spikers | Runner–up | |
| 2024 | PVL | Reinforced | Cignal HD Spikers | 3rd place | |
| 2024 | PVL | Invitational | Cignal HD Spikers | Runner-up | |
