= All-Filipino Conference =

In Philippine sports, an All-Filipino Conference refers to a tournament where only Filipino players or players of Filipino heritage can compete. This may refer to:

- PBA Philippine Cup, formerly named the All-Filipino Conference
- Premier Volleyball League All-Filipino Conference
- Philippine Super Liga All-Filipino Conference
- Shakey's V-League Open Conference
- Philippine Basketball League All-Filipino Cup
- Manila Industrial and Commercial Athletic Association All-Filipino Conference
