= Bureau of Customs Transformers (volleyball) =

- Short name: BOC
- Nickname: Transformers
- Founded: 2016
- Dissolved: 2017
- Head coach: Sherwin Meneses
- Captain: Alyssa Valdez (Ateneo)
- League: Shakey's V-League
- 2016 Reinforced: Runner-up

The Bureau of Customs Transformers was a professional women's volleyball team sponsored by Bureau of Customs that played in the Shakey's V-League.

== Roster ==
Bureau of Customs Transformers Line-up
No.	Name	Position	School
1	(Thailand) Kanjana Kuthaisong	Outside Hitter	
2	(Philippines) Alyssa Valdez (c)	Outside Hitter	Ateneo de Manila University
3	(Philippines) Michiko Castañeda	Middle Blocker	University of the Philippines
4	(Philippines) Jhona Corpuz	Middle Blocker	San Sebastian College – Recoletos
5	(Philippines) Rosemarie Vargas	Opposite Spiker	Far Eastern University
6	(Philippines) Jonalyn Ibisa	Libero	Arellano University
7	(Philippines) Menchie Tubiera	Outside Hitter/Libero	Arellano University
8	(Philippines) Fenela Emnas	Setter	Adamson University
9	(Philippines) Rizza Jane Mandapat	Opposite Spiker	National University
10	(Philippines) Maria Paulina Soriano	Middle Blocker	Adamson University
11	(Philippines) Lilet Mabbayad	Middle Blocker	University of Santo Tomas
13	(Thailand) Natthanicha Jaisaen	Setter	
14	(Philippines) Andrea Marzan	Middle Blocker	Arellano University
15	(Philippines) Marlyn Llagoso	Middle Blocker	Southwestern University

== Honors ==
=== Team ===
Season	Conference	Title	Ref.
2016 (Season 13)	Reinforced Conference	Runner-up	

=== Individual ===
Season	Conference	Award	Name	Ref.
2016 (Season 13)	Reinforced Conference	Most Valuable Player (Conference)	Alyssa Valdez	
2016 (Season 13)	Reinforced Conference	1st Best Outside Spiker	Alyssa Valdez	
2016 (Season 13)	Reinforced Conference	2nd Best Middle Blocker	Lilet Mabbayad	

== Imports ==
Season	Number	Player	Country
2016 (Season 13)	1	Kanjana Kuthaisong	Thailand
2016 (Season 13)	13	Natthanicha Jaisaen	Thailand

== Team captain ==
- Alyssa Valdez (2016)

== Coach ==
- Sherwin Meneses (2016)
