= 2016 Shakey's V-League season =

2016 SVL season
- League: Shakey's V-League
- Sport: Volleyball
- TV partner: ABS-CBN Sports and Action

Open Conference
- Season champions: Pocari Sweat Lady Warriors
- Runners-up: Philippine Air Force Jet Spikers
- Season MVP: Grethcel Soltones (BaliPure)

Collegiate Conference
- Season champions: National University
- Runners-up: Ateneo de Manila University
- Season MVP: Alyja Daphne Santiago (NU)

Reinforced Open Conference
- Season champions: Pocari Sweat Lady Warriors
- Runners-up: Bureau of Customs Transformers
- Season MVP: Alyssa Valdez (Customs)

Seasons
- ← 2015, 12th 2017 (1st PVL) →

The 2016 Shakey's V-League season was the thirteenth and last season for the Shakey's V-League. The succeeding tournaments (c. 2017–present) were named as the Philippine V-League and then ultimately the Premier Volleyball League. There were three indoor conferences for this season.

== Open Conference ==
Shakey's V-League 13th Season Open Conference
Abbr.	Team	Company	Colors	Head coach	Team captain
BAG	Baguio Summer Spikers	City of Baguio	Green and gold	Clarissa Tolentino	Krissian Tsuchiya (SLU)
BLP	BaliPure Purest Water Defenders	Balibago Waterworks System, Inc.	Blue and white	Ma. Rosario Soriano	Alyssa Valdez (Ateneo)
IRI	Iriga Lady Oragons	City of Iriga	Orange and blue	Elvis Pabilonia	Grazielle Bombita (UNC)
LAG	Laoag Power Smashers	City of Laoag	Green and white	Ernesto Pamilar	Relea Ferina Saet (DLSU)
NUI	NU Lady Bulldogs	National University	Gold and blue	Roger Gorayeb	Jaja Santiago (NU)
PAF	Philippine Air Force Jet Spikers	Philippine Air Force	Gold and navy blue	Jasper Jimenez	Wendy Anne Semana (FEU)
PSW	Pocari Sweat Lady Warriors	Federated Distributors, Inc.	Blue and gray	Rommel John Abella	Michele Gumabao (DLSU)
UPD	UP Lady Maroons	University of the Philippines	Maroon and white	Jerry Yee	Kathy Bersola (UP)

=== Preliminary round ===
Pos	Team	Pld	W	L	Pts	SW	SL	SR	SPW	SPL	SPR	Qualification
1	Philippine Air Force Spikers	7	6	1	17	18	7	2.571	572	510	1.122	Qualified to the semifinals
2	Pocari Sweat Lady Warriors	7	6	1	16	19	8	2.375	616	559	1.102	Qualified to the semifinals
3	BaliPure Purest Water Defenders	7	5	2	14	18	11	1.636	647	582	1.112	Qualified to the semifinals
4	Laoag Power Smashers	7	4	3	12	13	11	1.182	550	512	1.074	Qualified to the semifinals
5	NU Lady Bulldogs	7	3	4	12	16	13	1.231	641	596	1.076	
6	UP Lady Maroons	7	3	4	10	12	14	0.857	581	561	1.036	
7	Iriga Lady Oragons	7	1	6	3	6	18	0.333	466	575	0.810	
8	Baguio Summer Spikers	7	0	7	0	1	21	0.048	371	549	0.676	

=== Final round ===
- Ranking is based from the preliminary round.

Semifinals
1	Philippine Air Force	3	3
4	Laoag	0	2
2	Pocari Sweat	0	3	3
3	BaliPure	3	2	1

Finals
1	Philippine Air Force	3	1	1
2	Pocari Sweat	2	3	3
3rd place
3	BaliPure	3	3
4	Laoag	2	1

=== Individual awards ===
Award		Name
MVP	Finals: Conference:	Myla Pablo (Pocari); Grethcel Soltones (BaliPure)
Best Setter		Wendy Semana (Air Force)
Best Outside Spikers	1st: 2nd:	Alyssa Valdez (BaliPure); Myla Pablo (Pocari)
Best Middle Blockers	1st: 2nd:	Jaja Santiago ( NU); Kathy Bersola ( UP)
Best Opposite Spiker		Michele Gumabao (Pocari)
Best Libero		Melissa Gohing (Pocari)

=== Final standings ===
Rank	Team
1st place, gold medalist(s)	Pocari Sweat Lady Warriors
2nd place, silver medalist(s)	Philippine Air Force Jet Spikers
3rd place, bronze medalist(s)	BaliPure Purest Water Defenders
4	Laoag Power Smashers
5	NU Lady Bulldogs
6	UP Lady Maroons
7	Iriga Lady Oragons
8	Baguio Summer Spikers

== Collegiate Conference ==
Shakey's V-League 13th Season Collegiate Conference
Abbr.	Team	School	Colors	Head coach	Team captain
ADM	Ateneo Lady Eagles	Ateneo de Manila University	White and blue	Anusorn "Tai" Bundit	Michelle Morente
CSB	Benilde Lady Blazers	College of Saint Benilde	Green and black	Michael Cariño	Jeanette Panaga
FEU	FEU Lady Tamaraws	Far Eastern University	Green and yellow	Cesael "Shaq" Delos Santos	Mary Remy Joy Palma
NU	NU Lady Bulldogs	National University	Gold and blue	Roger Gorayeb	Jaja Santiago
SBC	San Beda Red Lionesses	San Beda College	Red and white	Nemesio Gavino	Rebecca Cuevas
SSC	San Sebastian Lady Stags	San Sebastian College – Recoletos de Manila	Gold and red	Roger Gorayeb	Grethcel Soltones
TIP	TIP Lady Engineers	Technological Institute of the Philippines	Yellow and black	Achilles Paril	Sheeka Espinosa
UPD	UP Lady Maroons	University of the Philippines	Maroon and white	Jerry Yee	Kathy Bersola
UPH	Perpetual Lady Altas	University of Perpetual Help System DALTA	Brown and white	Sinfronio "Sammy" Acaylar	Coleen Bravo
UST	UST Growling Tigresses	University of Santo Tomas	Yellow and white	Emilio "Kung Fu" Reyes Jr.	Ennajie Laure

=== Preliminary round ===
==== Group A ====
Pos	Team	Pld	W	L	Pts	SW	SL	SR	SPW	SPL	SPR	QQF
1	NU Lady Bulldogs	4	3	1	9	9	4	2.250	309	275	1.124	Quarterfinals
2	San Sebastian Lady Stags	4	3	1	9	9	5	1.800	316	313	1.010	Quarterfinals
3	Ateneo Lady Eagles	4	2	2	6	8	6	1.333	329	284	1.158	Quarterfinals
4	TIP Lady Engineers	4	2	2	6	6	5	1.200	322	320	1.006	
5	Perpetual Lady Altas	4	0	4	0	1	12	0.083	243	327	0.743	

==== Group B ====
Pos	Team	Pld	W	L	Pts	SW	SL	SR	SPW	SPL	SPR	Q4
1	FEU Lady Tamaraws	4	4	0	12	12	3	4.000	356	268	1.328	Quarterfinals
2	UP Lady Maroons	4	3	1	9	11	5	2.200	349	312	1.119	Quarterfinals
3	UST Growling Tigresses	4	2	2	8	8	8	1.000	350	336	1.042	Quarterfinals
4	San Beda Red Lionesses	4	1	3	3	5	9	0.556	274	327	0.838	
5	Benilde Lady Blazers	4	0	4	0	1	12	0.083	239	325	0.735	

=== Quarterfinals round ===
Pos	Team	Pld	W	L	Pts	SW	SL	SR	SPW	SPL	SPR	Qualification
1	FEU Lady Tamaraws	5	4	1	12	14	5	2.800	432	378	1.143	Semifinals
2	NU Lady Bulldogs	5	4	1	11	12	6	2.000	417	392	1.064	Semifinals
3	UP Lady Maroons	5	3	2	9	12	10	1.200	473	451	1.049	Semifinals
4	Ateneo Lady Eagles	5	2	3	6	7	9	0.778	360	356	1.011	Semifinals
5	San Sebastian Lady Stags	5	2	3	6	7	10	0.700	357	404	0.884	Fourth-seed playoff
6	UST Growling Tigresses	5	0	5	1	3	15	0.200	356	414	0.860	

=== Final round ===
- Ranking is based from the quarter-finals round.
- All series are best-of-3

Semifinals
1	FEU Lady Tamaraws	0	1
4	Ateneo Lady Eagles	3	3
2	NU Lady Bulldogs	3	3
3	UP Lady Maroons	1	1

Finals
Ateneo Lady Eagles	2	2
NU Lady Bulldogs	3	3
3rd place
FEU Lady Tamaraws	3	1
UP Lady Maroons	2	3

=== Individual awards ===
Award		Name
MVP	Finals: Conference:	Jasmine Nabor ( NU); Alyja Daphne "Jaja" Santiago ( NU)
Best Setter		Julia Melissa "Jia" Morado ( Ateneo
Best Outside Spikers	1st: 2nd:	Maria Lina Isabel "Isa" Molde ( UP); Jorelle Singh ( NU)
Best Middle Blockers	1st: 2nd:	Alyja Daphne "Jaja" Santiago ( NU); Mary Remy Joy Palma ( FEU)
Best Opposite Spiker		Toni Rose "Chin" Basas ( FEU)
Best Libero		Ma. Gizelle Jessica Tan ( Ateneo)

=== Final standings ===
Rank	Team
1st place, gold medalist(s)	NU Lady Bulldogs
2nd place, silver medalist(s)	Ateneo Lady Eagles
3rd place, bronze medalist(s)	UP Lady Maroons
4	FEU Lady Tamaraws
5	San Sebastian Lady Stags
6	UST Growling Tigresses
7	TIP Lady Engineers
8	San Beda Red Lionesses
9	Perpetual Lady Altas
10	Benilde Lady Blazers

== Reinforced Conference ==
Shakey's V-League 13th Season
Abbr.	Team	Company	Colors	Head coach	Team captain
BLP	BaliPure Purest Water Defenders	Balibago Waterworks System, Inc.		Anusorn "Tai" Bundit	Kaylee Manns (Iowa State)
BOC	Bureau of Customs Transformers	Bureau of Customs		Sherwin Meneses	Alyssa Valdez (ADMU)
PAF	Philippine Air Force Jet Spikers	Philippine Air Force		Jasper Jimenez	Wendy Semana (FEU)
PSW	Pocari Sweat Lady Warriors	Federated Distributors, Inc.		Ernest John Abella	Michele Gumabao (DLSU)
PCG	Philippine Coast Guard Lady Dolphins	Philippine Coast Guard		Butch Odron	Hazel Mea
UPD	UP Lady Maroons	University of the Philippines		Jerry Yee	Kathy Bersola (UP)
UST	UST Tigresses	University of Santo Tomas		Emilio "Kungfu" Reyes Jr.	Pamela Lastimosa (UST)
LAG	Laoag Power Smashers	City of Laoag		Ernesto Pamilar	Chie Saet (DLSU)

=== Preliminary round ===
Pos	Team	Pld	W	L	Pts	SW	SL	SR	SPW	SPL	SPR	Qualification
1	Pocari Sweat Lady Warriors	7	6	1	19	20	5	4.000	574	484	1.186	Semifinals
2	BaliPure Purest Water Defenders	7	5	2	17	19	6	3.167	540	452	1.195	Semifinals
3	Bureau of Customs Transformers	7	5	2	14	17	9	1.889	554	513	1.080	Semifinals
4	UST Growling Tigresses	7	5	2	14	16	10	1.600	592	548	1.080	Semifinals
5	UP Lady Maroons	7	3	4	9	9	13	0.692	476	483	0.986	
6	Laoag Power Smashers	7	2	5	8	11	16	0.688	590	593	0.995	
7	Philippine Air Force Jet Spikers	7	2	5	5	9	17	0.529	550	567	0.970	
8	Philippine Coast Guard Lady Dolphins	7	0	7	0	0	21	0.000	289	525	0.550	

=== Final round ===
- Ranking is based from the preliminary round.
- All series are best-of-3

Semifinals
1	Pocari Sweat Lady Warriors	3	3
4	UST Growling Tigresses	0	2
2	BaliPure Purest Water Defenders	3	1	2
3	Bureau of Customs Transformers	0	3	3

Finals
Pocari Sweat Lady Warriors	3	3
Bureau of Customs Transformers	0	1
3rd place
BaliPure Purest Water Defenders	3	3
UST Growling Tigresses	1	0

=== Individual awards ===
Award		Name
MVP	Finals: Conference:	Michele Gumabao (Pocari); Alyssa Valdez (Customs)
Best Setter		Iris Janelle Tolenada (Pocari)
Best Outside Spikers	1st: 2nd:	Alyssa Valdez (Customs); Ennajie Laure (UST)
Best Middle Blockers	1st: 2nd:	Marivic Meneses (UST); Lilet Mabbayad (Customs)
Best Opposite Spiker		Michele Gumabao (Pocari)
Best Libero		Dennise Lazaro (BaliPure)
Best Foreign Guest Player		Breanna Lee Mackie (Pocari)

=== Final standings ===
Rank	Team
1st place, gold medalist(s)	Pocari Sweat Lady Warriors
2nd place, silver medalist(s)	Bureau of Customs Transformers
3rd place, bronze medalist(s)	BaliPure Purest Water Defenders
4	UST Growling Tigresses
5	UP Lady Maroons
6	Laoag Power Smashers
7	Philippine Air Force Jet Spikers
8	Philippine Coast Guard Lady Dolphins

Preceded by 2015	Shakey's V-League; 2016	Succeeded by 2017

== Conference result ==
Rank	Open	Collegiate	Reinforced
1st place, gold medalist(s)	Pocari Sweat Lady Warriors	NU Lady Bulldogs	Pocari Sweat Lady Warriors
2nd place, silver medalist(s)	Philippine Air Force Jet Spikers	Ateneo Lady Eagles	Bureau of Customs Transformers
3rd place, bronze medalist(s)	BaliPure Purest Water Defenders	UP Lady Maroons	BaliPure Purest Water Defenders
4	Laoag Power Smashers	FEU Lady Tamaraws	UST Growling Tigresses
5	NU Lady Bulldogs	San Sebastian Lady Stags	UP Lady Maroons
6	UP Lady Maroons	UST Growling Tigresses	Laoag Power Smashers
7	Iriga Lady Oragons	TIP Lady Engineers	Philippine Air Force Jet Spikers
8	Baguio Summer Spikers	San Beda Red Lionesses	Philippine Coast Guard Lady Dolphins
9	—N/a	Perpetual Lady Altas	—N/a
10	—N/a	Benilde Lady Blazers	—N/a

== Broadcast partner ==
- ABS-CBN Sports+Action

== See also ==
- 2016 Spikers' Turf
