= 2022 Premier Volleyball League Open Conference =

First conference of the 2022 PVL season

- Duration: March 16 – April 8, 2022
- Teams: 9
- Matches: 33
- Attendance: 93,545 (2,835 per match)
- TV partner(s): One Sports; One Sports+

Results
- Champions: Creamline Cool Smashers
- Runners-up: Petro Gazz Angels
- Third place: Cignal HD Spikers
- Fourth place: Choco Mucho Flying Titans

Awards
- Conference MVP: Tots Carlos
- Finals MVP: Alyssa Valdez
- Best OH: Frances Molina; Grethcel Soltones
- Best MB: Roselyn Doria; Ria Meneses
- Best OPP: Tots Carlos
- Best Setter: Gel Cayuna
- Best Libero: Dawn Macandili

PVL Open Conference chronology
- < 2021 2023 First (All-Filipino) >

PVL conference chronology
- < 2021 Open 2022 Invitational >

The 2022 Premier Volleyball League Open Conference was the eleventh conference of the Premier Volleyball League, its second conference as a professional league, and the first conference of the 2022 season.

The conference was held from March 16 to April 8, 2022, pending restrictions brought by the COVID-19 pandemic. A pool play format was adapted for the first time, wherein teams were divided into two pools, as opposed to a round-robin format where all teams play against each other at least once. The preliminary round was held at the Paco Arena in Manila. The quarterfinal round and semifinals games 1 & 3 were held at the San Juan Arena in San Juan. The semifinals game 2 and finals game 1 were held at SM Mall of Asia Arena in Pasay, while the finals game 2 was held at Ynares Center in Antipolo, Rizal.

Nine teams competed in this conference, as Chery Tiggo 7 Pro Crossovers looked to defend their championship. F2 Logistics Cargo Movers had their debut in the Premier Volleyball League. Two teams from the previous conference, Sta. Lucia Lady Realtors and Perlas Spikers, filed for a leave of absence from the league, and released all of their players.

== Participating teams ==
2022 Premier Volleyball League Open Conference
Abbr.	Team	Affiliation	Head coach	Team captain
ABM	Army Black Mamba Lady Troopers	Philippine Army / Corbridge Group	Kungfu Reyes	Royse Tubino
BLP	BaliPure Purest Water Defenders	Balibago Waterworks System, Inc.	Rommel Abella	Alina Bicar
CTC	Chery Tiggo 7 Pro Crossovers	United Asia Automotive Group, Inc.	Aaron Vélez	Jasmine Nabor
CMF	Choco Mucho Flying Titans	Republic Biscuit Corporation	Oliver Almadro	Bea De Leon
CHD	Cignal HD Spikers	Cignal TV, Inc.	Shaq Delos Santos	Rachel Daquis
CCS	Creamline Cool Smashers	Republic Biscuit Corporation	Sherwin Meneses	Alyssa Valdez
FTL	F2 Logistics Cargo Movers	F2 Logistics Philippines	Benson Bocboc	Aby Maraño
PGA	Petro Gazz Angels	PetroGazz Ventures Phils. Corp.	Jerry Yee	Chie Saet
PLD	PLDT High Speed Hitters	PLDT Inc.	George Pascua	Rhea Dimaculangan

== Pool composition ==
For the first time in league history, the Open Conference catered multiple pools in the preliminary round with the nine participating teams grouped into two pools. The groupings were unveiled on February 18, 2022 with teams grouped through serpentine system using 2021 Open Conference final standings. F2 Logistics Cargo Movers were drawn to Pool A during their meeting as they did not compete in the last conference.

Pool A	Pool B
Chery Tiggo Crossovers (1)	Creamline Cool Smashers (2)
Choco Mucho Flying Titans (4)	Petro Gazz Angels (3)
Black Mamba Army Lady Troopers (6)	PLDT High Speed Hitters (7)
Cignal HD Spikers (10)	BaliPure Purest Water Defenders (8)
F2 Logistics Cargo Movers (new)	

== Venues ==
The conference started on a "semi-bubble" setup with a strict home-venue-home format for teams at the Paco Arena with no spectators allowed in the venue due to COVID-19 restrictions. After the preliminary round, the league officially started accepting live audiences to watch the games in the playoffs.

Preliminaries	Quarterfinals, classification, semifinals
City of Manila	San Juan City
Paco Arena	Filoil EcoOil Centre
Capacity: 1,000	Capacity: 6,000
Classification, semifinals, finals	Semifinals, finals
Pasay City	Antipolo
SM Mall of Asia Arena	Ynares Center
Capacity: 15,000	Capacity: 7,400

== Transactions ==
=== National team players ===
- The following players were part of the national team that would compete in the 31st Southeast Asian Games in May.

Team	Player/s			
Chery Tiggo 7 Pro Crossovers	Mylene Paat	Jaja Santiago	—N/a	
Choco Mucho Flying Titans	Kat Tolentino	—N/a		
Cignal HD Spikers	Ria Meneses	Frances Molina	—N/a	
Creamline Cool Smashers	Jema Galanza	Kyle Negrito	Alyssa Valdez	—N/a
F2 Logistics Cargo Movers	Mary Joy Baron	Dawn Macandili	Abigail Maraño	Iris Tolenada
PLDT High Speed Hitters	Kath Arado	Dell Palomata	—N/a	

=== Team additions and transfers ===
The following are the players who transferred to another team on the upcoming conference.

Player	Moving from (last team)	Moving to
Necole Ebuen	Choco Mucho Flying Titans	Army Black Mamba Lady Troopers
Michelle Morente	Perlas Spikers	Army Black Mamba Lady Troopers
Jeanette Villareal	Perlas Spikers	Army Black Mamba Lady Troopers
Ivy Perez	Petro Gazz Angels	Army Black Mamba Lady Troopers
Aiko Urdas	PLDT Home Fibr Power Hitters	Army Black Mamba Lady Troopers
Rapril Aguilar	Cignal HD Spikers	BaliPure Purest Water Defenders
Julia Ipac	Cignal HD Spikers	BaliPure Purest Water Defenders
Janine Marciano	Cignal HD Spikers	BaliPure Purest Water Defenders
Marian Buitre	Chery Tiggo Crossovers	BaliPure Purest Water Defenders
Jamie Lavitoria	Choco Mucho Flying Titans	BaliPure Purest Water Defenders
Patty Orendain	Generika-Ayala Lifesavers(PSL)	BaliPure Purest Water Defenders
Jhoana Maraguinot	Perlas Spikers	BaliPure Purest Water Defenders
Alina Joyce Bicar	Petro Gazz Angels	BaliPure Purest Water Defenders
Alyssa Eroa	PLDT Home Fibr Power Hitters	BaliPure Purest Water Defenders
Julia Angeles	BaliPure Purest Water Defenders	Chery Tiggo Crossovers
May Luna	Cignal HD Spikers	Chery Tiggo Crossovers
Cza Carandang	Perlas Spikers	Chery Tiggo Crossovers
Roma Joy Doromal	Perlas Spikers	Chery Tiggo Crossovers
Necelle Mae Gual	PLDT Home Fibr Power Hitters	Chery Tiggo Crossovers
EJ Laure	UST Golden Tigresses (UAAP)	Chery Tiggo Crossovers
Aduke Christine Ogunsanya	F2 Logistics Cargo Movers	Choco Mucho Flying Titans
Desiree Wynea Cheng	F2 Logistics Cargo Movers	Choco Mucho Flying Titans
Cherry Rose Nunag	Perlas Spikers	Choco Mucho Flying Titans
Jamenea Ferrer	Perlas Spikers	Choco Mucho Flying Titans
Thang Ponce	Perlas Spikers	Choco Mucho Flying Titans
Maria Lina Isabel Molde	PLDT Home Fibr Power Hitters	Choco Mucho Flying Titans
Graze Bombita	BaliPure Purest Water Defenders	Cignal HD Spikers
Angeli Araneta	Generika-Ayala Lifesavers(PSL)	Cignal HD Spikers
Bia General	Generika-Ayala Lifesavers(PSL)	Cignal HD Spikers
Gel Cayuna	Perlas Spikers	Cignal HD Spikers
Ria Meneses	Petro Gazz Angels	Cignal HD Spikers
Frances Molina	Petro Gazz Angels	Cignal HD Spikers
Jerrili Malabanan	Petro Gazz Angels	Cignal HD Spikers
Marist Layug	PLDT Home Fibr Power Hitters	Cignal HD Spikers
Glaudine Tronocoso	Sta. Lucia Lady Realtors	Cignal HD Spikers
Iris Janelle Tolenada	Motolite Power Builders	F2 Logistics Cargo Movers
Dzi Gervacio	Perlas Spikers	F2 Logistics Cargo Movers
Shola Alvarez	PLDT Home Fibr Power Hitters	F2 Logistics Cargo Movers
Jessma Clarice Ramos	UP Fighting Maroons (UAAP)	F2 Logistics Cargo Movers
Rose Mary Cailing	UP Fighting Maroons (UAAP)	F2 Logistics Cargo Movers
Nicole Tiamzon	Perlas Spikers	Petro Gazz Angels
Marielle Gabarda	PLDT Home Fibr Power Hitters	Petro Gazz Angels
Aiza Maizo-Pontillas	Sta. Lucia Lady Realtors	Petro Gazz Angels
MJ Phillips	Sta. Lucia Lady Realtors	Petro Gazz Angels
Bang Pineda	Sta. Lucia Lady Realtors	Petro Gazz Angels
Djanel Cheng	Sta. Lucia Lady Realtors	Petro Gazz Angels
Jonah Sabete	Sta. Lucia Lady Realtors	Petro Gazz Angels
Fiola Ceballos	Cignal HD Spikers	PLDT High Speed Hitters
Heather Guino-o	Perlas Spikers	PLDT High Speed Hitters
Jules Samonte	Perlas Spikers	PLDT High Speed Hitters
Kath Arado	Petro Gazz Angels	PLDT High Speed Hitters
Jessey De Leon	Petro Gazz Angels	PLDT High Speed Hitters
Mean Mendrez	Petro Gazz Angels	PLDT High Speed Hitters
Wendy Semana	Philippine Air Force Lady Jet Spikers	PLDT High Speed Hitters
Dell Palomata	Sta. Lucia Lady Realtors	PLDT High Speed Hitters
Jovie Prado	Sta. Lucia Lady Realtors	PLDT High Speed Hitters
Mika Aereen Reyes	Sta. Lucia Lady Realtors	PLDT High Speed Hitters
Lhara Clavano	UE Lady Warriors (UAAP)	PLDT High Speed Hitters

=== Coaching changes ===
Team	Outgoing coach	Manner of departure	Replaced by	Ref
Creamline Cool Smashers	(Thailand) Anusorn Bundit	Replaced due to COVID-19 lockdowns	(Philippines) Sherwin Meneses	
Petro Gazz Angels	(Philippines) Arnold Laniog	Reassigned	(Philippines) Jerry Yee	
PLDT High Speed Hitters	(Philippines) Roger Gorayeb	Resigned	(Philippines) George Pascua	

== Format ==
Preliminary round

The nine teams were split into two pools, one pool of five and one pool of four, and competed in a single round-robin tournament, with each team playing one match against all other teams within their group. The top four teams from each group advanced to the quarterfinals, with the top two earning a twice-to-beat advantage. The fifth place team from the group of five was eliminated from title contention and advanced to the 7th–9th classification round.

Quarterfinals

The top four teams from each preliminary round pool competed in the crossover quarterfinals. The top two teams from each pool had a twice-to-beat advantage, meaning those teams only needed to win one of their next two matches, while their opponents needed to win two matches in a row. The winners advanced to the semifinals while the losers competed in the classification rounds. The match-ups for the quarterfinals were as follows:

- QF1: Pool A #1 vs. Pool B #4
- QF2: Pool B #1 vs. Pool A #4
- QF3: Pool A #2 vs. Pool B #3
- QF4: Pool B #2 vs. Pool A #3

Classification rounds

The losing teams from the quarterfinals competed in one of two classification rounds. The losers from QF1 and QF2 joined the fifth place team from the pool of five in the 7th–9th classification round. Teams competed in a single round-robin tournament, with each team playing a total of two matches. Teams were ranked 7th through 9th in the final standings, based on results from this round. The losers from QF3 and QF4 competed in a single match to determine which team would finish fifth in this conference.

Semifinals

The winning teams from the quarterfinals competed in the semifinals. Teams competed in best-of-three series, with the winners advancing to the finals, while the losers competed in the third place series. The match-ups for the semifinals were as follows:

- SF1: QF1 winner vs. QF4 winner
- SF2: QF2 winner vs. QF3 winner

Third place series

The losing teams from the semifinals competed in a best-of-three series to determine which team would finish third in this conference. If the series is tied at 1–1 when the championship is decided, the pool standing procedure is used (starting from set ratio).

Finals

The winning teams from the semifinals competed in a best-of-three series to determine the conference champions. The losing team in this round was declared conference runners-up.

== Pool standing procedure ==
Teams are initially ranked by wins followed by match points. A win awards three points if the match lasted for three or four sets (3–0 or 3–1), or two points if the match lasted for five sets (3–2). A loss only awards one point if the match lasted for five sets (2–3).

If multiple teams tie for wins and match points, the next criteria are set ratio (the number of sets won divided by number of sets lost across all matches) and point ratio (the number of points won divided by number of points lost across all matches). If any teams are still tied, the procedure will be applied again, but only considering matches between the remaining tied teams.

== Preliminary round ==
- All times are Philippines Standard Time (UTC+8:00).

=== Pool A ===
Pos	Team	Pld	W	L	Pts	SW	SL	SR	SPW	SPL	SPR	Qualification
1	Cignal HD Spikers	4	4	0	12	12	4	3.000	381	324	1.176	Quarterfinals with twice to beat advantage
2	Choco Mucho Flying Titans	4	3	1	8	10	6	1.667	353	339	1.041	Quarterfinals with twice to beat advantage
3	F2 Logistics Cargo Movers	4	2	2	6	8	7	1.143	342	334	1.024	Quarterfinals
4	Chery Tiggo Crossovers	4	1	3	4	6	9	0.667	327	331	0.988	Quarterfinals
5	Army Black Mamba Lady Troopers	4	0	4	0	2	12	0.167	266	341	0.780	Classification round

Source: PhilSports.ph

Date	Time		Score		Set 1	Set 2	Set 3	Set 4	Set 5	Total	Report
16 Mar	15:00	Army Black Mamba Lady Troopers	1–3	F2 Logistics Cargo Movers	15–25	18–25	25–21	22–25		80–96	P2
16 Mar	18:00	Chery Tiggo 7 Pro Crossovers	1–3	Cignal HD Spikers	22–25	25–22	22–25	18–25		87–97	P2
18 Mar	15:00	Choco Mucho Flying Titans	3–0	Army Black Mamba Lady Troopers	25–13	25–11	25–23			75–47	P2
18 Mar	18:00	F2 Logistics Cargo Movers	3–0	Chery Tiggo 7 Pro Crossovers	25–16	25–23	25–22			75–61	P2
20 Mar	15:00	Cignal HD Spikers	3–1	F2 Logistics Cargo Movers	25–14	25–21	19–25	25–18		94–78	P2
20 Mar	18:00	Chery Tiggo 7 Pro Crossovers	2–3	Choco Mucho Flying Titans	21–25	25–16	17–25	25–17	16–18	104–101	P2
22 Mar	15:00	Choco Mucho Flying Titans	1–3	Cignal HD Spikers	25–20	17–25	20–25	16–25		78–95	P2
22 Mar	18:00	Army Black Mamba Lady Troopers	0–3	Chery Tiggo 7 Pro Crossovers	22–25	17–25	19–25			58–75	P2
24 Mar	15:00	Cignal HD Spikers	3–1	Army Black Mamba Lady Troopers	25–20	20–25	25–17	25–19		95–81	P2
24 Mar	18:00	F2 Logistics Cargo Movers	1–3	Choco Mucho Flying Titans	25–21	26–28	20–25	22–25		93–99	P2

=== Pool B ===
Pos	Team	Pld	W	L	Pts	SW	SL	SR	SPW	SPL	SPR	Qualification
1	Creamline Cool Smashers	3	3	0	8	9	2	4.500	261	207	1.261	Quarterfinals with twice to beat advantage
2	Petro Gazz Angels	3	2	1	7	8	5	1.600	294	278	1.058	Quarterfinals with twice to beat advantage
3	PLDT High Speed Hitters	3	1	2	3	4	6	0.667	219	235	0.932	Quarterfinals
4	BaliPure Purest Water Defenders	3	0	3	0	1	9	0.111	195	249	0.783	Quarterfinals

Source: PhilSports.ph

Date	Time		Score		Set 1	Set 2	Set 3	Set 4	Set 5	Total	Report
17 Mar	15:00	Petro Gazz Angels	3–1	BaliPure Purest Water Defenders	25–14	25–20	23–25	25–21		98–80	P2
17 Mar	18:00	Creamline Cool Smashers	3–0	PLDT High Speed Hitters	25–16	25–18	25–22			75–56	P2
21 Mar	15:00	PLDT High Speed Hitters	1–3	Petro Gazz Angels	22–25	25–19	22–25	18–25		87–94	P2
21 Mar	18:00	BaliPure Purest Water Defenders	0–3	Creamline Cool Smashers	12–25	21–25	16–25			49–75	P2
23 Mar	15:00	BaliPure Purest Water Defenders	0–3	PLDT High Speed Hitters	20–25	24–26	22–25			66–76	P2
23 Mar	18:00	Petro Gazz Angels	2–3	Creamline Cool Smashers	23–25	25–23	19–25	25–23	10–15	102–111	P2

== Bracket ==
- All times are Philippines Standard Time (UTC+08:00).

Quarterfinals
March 28
A1 Cignal	3
B4 BaliPure	0
March 29
B2 Petro Gazz	3
A3 F2 Logistics	1
March 28
B1 Creamline	3
A4 Chery Tiggo	1
March 29
A2 Choco Mucho	3
B3 PLDT	2

Semifinals
April 1–4
Cignal	3	2	1
Petro Gazz	0	3	3
April 1–3
Creamline	3	3
Choco Mucho	1	1

Championship
April 6–8
Petro Gazz	0	0
Creamline	3	3
Third place
April 6–8
Cignal	1	3	1.02
Choco Mucho	3	1	0.98

== Quarterfinals ==
- All times are Philippines Standard Time (UTC+08:00).

=== (A1) Cignal vs. (B4) BaliPure ===
March 28, 2022; 3:00 pm	Cignal HD Spikers	3–0	BaliPure Purest Water Defenders	Filoil Flying V Arena; Attendance: 724; Referees: Lumer Pajarillo (PHI), Ernesto Cabusa (PHI)
March 28, 2022; 3:00 pm	(25–14, 25–9, 25–14); P2			Filoil Flying V Arena; Attendance: 724; Referees: Lumer Pajarillo (PHI), Ernesto Cabusa (PHI)
Cignal wins series in one match

=== (B1) Creamline vs. (A4) Chery Tiggo ===
March 28, 2022; 6:00 pm	Creamline Cool Smashers	3–1	Chery Tiggo 7 Pro Crossovers	Filoil Flying V Arena; Attendance: 2,223; Referees: Roberto Celso (PHI), Erwin Cordero (PHI)
March 28, 2022; 6:00 pm	(25–18, 25–14, 23–25, 25–19); P2			Filoil Flying V Arena; Attendance: 2,223; Referees: Roberto Celso (PHI), Erwin Cordero (PHI)
Creamline wins series in one match

=== (A2) Choco Mucho vs. (B3) PLDT ===
March 29, 2022; 3:00 pm	Choco Mucho Flying Titans	3–2	PLDT High Speed Hitters	Filoil Flying V Arena; Attendance: 3,311; Referees: Bobby Celso (PHI), Joy de Imus (PHI)
March 29, 2022; 3:00 pm	(25–21, 23–25, 29–31, 25–15, 15–11); P2			Filoil Flying V Arena; Attendance: 3,311; Referees: Bobby Celso (PHI), Joy de Imus (PHI)
Choco Mucho wins series in one match

=== (B2) Petro Gazz vs. (A3) F2 Logistics ===
March 29, 2022; 6:00 pm	Petro Gazz Angels	3–1	F2 Logistics Cargo Movers	Filoil Flying V Arena; Attendance: 1,788; Referees: Mark Santos (PHI), Nestor Matimatico (PHI)
March 29, 2022; 6:00 pm	(25–14, 22–25, 25–20, 25–19); P2			Filoil Flying V Arena; Attendance: 1,788; Referees: Mark Santos (PHI), Nestor Matimatico (PHI)
Petro Gazz wins series in one match

== Classification rounds ==
- All times are Philippines Standard Time (UTC+08:00).

=== 7th–9th classification round ===
Pos	Team	Pld	W	L	Pts	SW	SL	SR	SPW	SPL	SPR
7	Army Black Mamba Lady Troopers	2	1	1	4	5	3	1.667	174	176	0.989
8	Chery Tiggo 7 Pro Crossovers	2	1	1	3	5	5	1.000	207	195	1.062
9	BaliPure Purest Water Defenders	2	1	1	2	3	5	0.600	166	176	0.943

April 1, 2022; 11:00 am	Army Black Mamba Lady Troopers	3–0	BaliPure Purest Water Defenders	Filoil Flying V Arena; Attendance: 1,338; Referees: Ernesto Matimatico (PHI), Mary Joy de Imus (PHI)
April 1, 2022; 11:00 am	(25–22, 25–21, 27–25); P2			Filoil Flying V Arena; Attendance: 1,338; Referees: Ernesto Matimatico (PHI), Mary Joy de Imus (PHI)

April 3, 2022; 11:00 am	Chery Tiggo 7 Pro Crossovers	3–2	Army Black Mamba Lady Troopers	SM Mall of Asia Arena; Attendance: 2,518; Referees: Ernesto Cabusa (PHI), Mary Joy de Imus (PHI)
April 3, 2022; 11:00 am	(25–15, 25–20, 20–25, 23–25, 15–12); P2			SM Mall of Asia Arena; Attendance: 2,518; Referees: Ernesto Cabusa (PHI), Mary Joy de Imus (PHI)

April 5, 2022; 3:00 pm	BaliPure Purest Water Defenders	3–2	Chery Tiggo 7 Pro Crossovers	Filoil Flying V Arena; Attendance: 138; Referees: Ernesto Cabusa (PHI), Mark Anthony Santos (PHI)
April 5, 2022; 3:00 pm	(15–25, 25–20, 18–25, 25–22, 15–7); P2			Filoil Flying V Arena; Attendance: 138; Referees: Ernesto Cabusa (PHI), Mark Anthony Santos (PHI)

=== Fifth place match ===
April 5, 2022; 6:00 pm	PLDT High Speed Hitters	3–2	F2 Logistics Cargo Movers	Filoil Flying V Arena; Attendance: 316; Referees: Lumer Pajarillo (PHI), Mary Joy de Imus (PHI)
April 5, 2022; 6:00 pm	(25–21, 21–25, 25–17, 28–30, 15–8); P2			Filoil Flying V Arena; Attendance: 316; Referees: Lumer Pajarillo (PHI), Mary Joy de Imus (PHI)

== Semifinals ==
- All times are Philippines Standard Time (UTC+08:00).

=== (A1) Cignal vs. (B2) Petro Gazz ===
April 1, 2022; 3:00 pm	Cignal HD Spikers	3–0	Petro Gazz Angels	Filoil Flying V Arena; Attendance: 4,567; Referees: Bobby Celso (PHI), Mark Santos (PHI)
April 1, 2022; 3:00 pm	(25–21, 25–23, 25–23); P2			Filoil Flying V Arena; Attendance: 4,567; Referees: Bobby Celso (PHI), Mark Santos (PHI)
Cignal leads series, 1–0

April 3, 2022; 6:00 pm	Petro Gazz Angels	3–2	Cignal HD Spikers	SM Mall of Asia Arena; Attendance: 11,585; Referees: Lumer Pajarillo (PHI), Mary Joy de Imus (PHI)
April 3, 2022; 6:00 pm	(25–22, 21–25, 22–25, 26–24, 18–16); P2			SM Mall of Asia Arena; Attendance: 11,585; Referees: Lumer Pajarillo (PHI), Mary Joy de Imus (PHI)
Series tied, 1–1

April 4, 2022; 6:00 pm	Cignal HD Spikers	1–3	Petro Gazz Angels	Filoil Flying V Arena; Attendance: 2,376; Referees: Mark Anthony Santos (PHI), Erwin Lu Cordero (PHI)
April 4, 2022; 6:00 pm	(21–25, 26–28, 25–15, 21–25); P2			Filoil Flying V Arena; Attendance: 2,376; Referees: Mark Anthony Santos (PHI), Erwin Lu Cordero (PHI)
Petro Gazz wins series, 2–1

=== (B1) Creamline vs. (A2) Choco Mucho ===
April 1, 2022; 3:00 pm	Choco Mucho Flying Titans	1–3	Creamline Cool Smashers	Filoil Flying V Arena; Attendance: 5,368; Referees: Lumer Pajarillo (PHI), Nestor Matematico (PHI)
April 1, 2022; 3:00 pm	(25–18, 17–25, 25–19, 25–11); P2			Filoil Flying V Arena; Attendance: 5,368; Referees: Lumer Pajarillo (PHI), Nestor Matematico (PHI)
Creamline leads series, 1–0

April 3, 2022; 6:00 pm	Creamline Cool Smashers	3–1	Choco Mucho Flying Titans	SM Mall of Asia Arena; Attendance: 16,877; Referees: Mark Santos (PHI), Erwin Lou Cordero (PHI)
April 3, 2022; 6:00 pm	(25–23, 19–25, 18–25, 15–25); P2			SM Mall of Asia Arena; Attendance: 16,877; Referees: Mark Santos (PHI), Erwin Lou Cordero (PHI)
Creamline wins series, 2–0

== Third place series ==
April 6, 2022; 3:00 pm	Choco Mucho Flying Titans	3–1	Cignal HD Spikers	SM Mall of Asia Arena; Attendance: 10,668; Referees: Bobby Celso (PHI), Lumer Pajarillo (PHI)
April 6, 2022; 3:00 pm	(25–17, 25–21, 21–25, 25–22); P2			SM Mall of Asia Arena; Attendance: 10,668; Referees: Bobby Celso (PHI), Lumer Pajarillo (PHI)
Choco Mucho leads series, 1–0

April 8, 2022; 3:00 pm	Cignal HD Spikers	3–1	Choco Mucho Flying Titans	Ynares Center; Attendance: 6,341; Referees: Rene Gaspillo (PHI), Nestor Matimatico (PHI)
April 8, 2022; 3:00 pm	(25–18, 27–25, 23–25, 25–17); P2			Ynares Center; Attendance: 6,341; Referees: Rene Gaspillo (PHI), Nestor Matimatico (PHI)
Series tied, 1–1

Since the finals series concluded after two matches, the third match of the third place series was cancelled and the pool standing procedure was used to determine the winner. Cignal had a higher point ratio than Choco Mucho (1.022–0.978), and thus were ranked third in the final standings.

== Finals ==
- All times are Philippines Standard Time (UTC+08:00).

April 6, 2022; 6:00 pm	Creamline Cool Smashers	3–1	Petro Gazz Angels	SM Mall of Asia Arena; Attendance: 14,573; Referees: Mark Santos (PHI), Erwin Cordero (PHI)
April 6, 2022; 6:00 pm	(25–16, 23–25, 25–12, 32–30); P2			SM Mall of Asia Arena; Attendance: 14,573; Referees: Mark Santos (PHI), Erwin Cordero (PHI)
Creamline leads series, 1–0

April 8, 2022; 6:00 pm	Petro Gazz Angels	1–3	Creamline Cool Smashers	Ynares Center; Attendance: 8,231; Referees: Bobby Celso (PHI), Lumer Pajarillo (PHI)
April 8, 2022; 6:00 pm	(18–25, 25–15, 23–25, 16–25); P2			Ynares Center; Attendance: 8,231; Referees: Bobby Celso (PHI), Lumer Pajarillo (PHI)
Creamline wins series, 2–0

== Final standing ==
Rank	Team
1st place, gold medalist(s)	Creamline Cool Smashers
2nd place, silver medalist(s)	Petro Gazz Angels
3rd place, bronze medalist(s)	Cignal HD Spikers
4	Choco Mucho Flying Titans
5	PLDT High Speed Hitters
6	F2 Logistics Cargo Movers
7	Army Black Mamba Lady Troopers
8	Chery Tiggo 7 Pro Crossovers
9	BaliPure Purest Water Defenders

2022 PVL Open champions
Creamline Cool Smashers
Fourth title

Team roster
Alyssa Valdez, Celine Domingo, Risa Sato, Jeanette Panaga, Ella de Jesus, Pau Soriano, Kyla Atienza, Jia de Guzman (c), Fille Cainglet-Cayetano, Kyle Negrito, Rizza Mandapat, Jema Galanza, Rosemarie Vargas, Tots Carlos
Head coach
Sherwin Meneses

== Awards and medalists ==
=== Individual awards ===
Award	Player	Team	Ref
Conference Most Valuable Player	Tots Carlos	Creamline	
Finals Most Valuable Player	Alyssa Valdez	Creamline	
1st Best Outside Spiker	Frances Molina	Cignal	
2nd Best Outside Spiker	Grethcel Soltones	Petro Gazz	
1st Best Middle Blocker	Roselyn Doria	Cignal	
2nd Best Middle Blocker	Ria Meneses	Cignal	
Best Opposite Spiker	Tots Carlos	Creamline	
Best Setter	Gel Cayuna	Cignal	
Best Libero	Dawn Macandili	F2 Logistics	

=== Medalists ===
Gold	Silver	Bronze
Creamline Cool Smashers Alyssa Valdez (c); Kyle Angela Negrito; Risa Sato; Fille Cayetano; Jeanette Panaga; Ella de Jesus (L); Pau Soriano; Kyla Atienza (L); Jia de Guzman; Celine Domingo; Rizza Mandapat; Jema Galanza; Rosemarie Vargas; Tots Carlos Head Coach: Sherwin Meneses	Petro Gazz Angels Relea Ferina Saet (c); Bang Pineda (L); Djanel Welch Cheng; Mariella Gabarda; Grethcel Soltones; Seth Marione Rodriguez; Aiza Maizo-Pontillas; Mary Remy Joy Palma; Myla Pablo; MJ Phillips; Cienne Mary Arielle Cruz (L); Nicole Tiamzon; Jonah Sabete Head Coach: Jerry Yee	Cignal HD Spikers Rachel Daquis (c); Glaudine Troncoso; Maristela Genn Layug; Frances Molina; Angeli Pauline Araneta; Fatima Bia General (L); Roselyn Doria; Jerilli Malabanan; Angelique Dionela (L); Klarisa Abriam; Ria Meneses; Ayel Estrañero; Gel Cayuna; Grazielle Bombita Head Coach: Cesael Delos Santos

== See also ==
- 2022 Spikers' Turf Open Conference
