= Power Smashers =

Filipino women's volleyball team

- Short name: PSM
- Founded: 2016
- Dissolved: 2018
- History: Laoag Power Smashers; 2016; Power Smashers; 2017
- Head coach: Ernesto Pamilyar
- Captain: Jovelyn Grace Prado
- League: Premier Volleyball League
- 2017 Open: 7th place

Uniforms
Home	Away

The Power Smashers were a women's volleyball team in the Philippines representing Laoag, Ilocos Norte and owned by the city's government.

was a professional women's volleyball team that played in the Premier Volleyball League. The team was owned by the city government of Laoag. The team competed in the Shakey's V-League/Premier Volleyball League from 2016 to 2017.

== Roster ==
- until end of 2017 season

Power Smashers
No.	Name	Position	Height (m)	Birth Date
1	(Philippines) Mary Anne Esguerra	Opposite hitter	1.80 m (5 ft 11 in)	April 22, 1997 (age 29)
4	(Philippines) Regine Arocha	Outside hitter	1.70 m (5 ft 7 in)	February 21, 1997 (age 29)
5	(Philippines) Dimdim Pacres	Opposite spiker	1.75 m (5 ft 9 in)	
8	(Philippines) Vira May Guillema	Setter		
9	(Philippines) Jan Eunice Galang	Libero	1.60 m (5 ft 3 in)	November 4, 1995 (age 30)
10	(Philippines) Alina Bicar	Setter	1.68 m (5 ft 6 in)	
13	(Philippines) Charlene Monico Gillego	Libero	1.60 m (5 ft 3 in)	December 12, 1984 (age 41)
14	(Philippines) Andrea Marzan	Middle blocker	1.80 m (5 ft 11 in)	January 10, 1995 (age 31)
15	(Philippines) Angela Susan Kim	Opposite spiker		
16	(Philippines) Wynneth Eulalio	Middle blocker	1.75 m (5 ft 9 in)	July 7, 1992 (age 34)
18	(Philippines) Jovielyn Grace Prado	Outside hitter	1.73 m (5 ft 8 in)	

Coaching staff

- Head coach:
  (Philippines) Ernesto Pamilar
- Assistant coach(es):
  (Philippines) Alegro Carpio
  (Philippines) Ariel dela Cruz

Team Staff

- Team Manager:
  (Philippines)
- Team Trainer:
  (Philippines) Roberto Javier

Medical Staff

- Team Physician:
- Physical Therapist:

== Honors ==
=== Team ===
Season	Conference	Title	Source
2017	Reinforced	4th place	
2017	Open	7th place	
2018	Reinforced	did not compete	
2018	Open	did not compete	

=== Individual ===
Season	Conference	Award	Name
2017	Reinforced	Best Opposite Spiker	(Philippines) Dimdim Pacres

== Imports ==
Season	Number	Player	Country
2017	3	Kannika Thipachot	Thailand
2017	11	Amporn Hyapha	Thailand

== Team captains ==
- Jovielyn Grace Prado (2017)

== Coaches ==
- Ernesto Pamilar (2017)

== Former players ==
Local players

Philippines

- Katherine Villegas
- Joyce Sta. Rita
- Charlemagne Simborio
- Alexandra Denice Tan

Foreign players

Thailand

- Kannika Thipachot
- Amporn Hyapha
