= 2017 Premier Volleyball League Reinforced Conference =

First conference of the 2017 PVL season

- Duration: April 30 – June 15, 2017
- Teams: 6
- TV partner(s): ABS-CBN Sports and Action

Results
- Champions: Pocari Sweat Lady Warriors
- Runners-up: BaliPure Purest Water Defenders
- Third place: Creamline Cool Smashers
- Fourth place: Power Smashers

Awards
- Conference MVP: Alyssa Valdez
- Finals MVP: Myla Pablo
- Best OH: Alyssa Valdez; Grethcel Soltones
- Best MB: Risa Sato; Jeanette Panaga
- Best OPP: Dimdim Pacres
- Best Setter: Jasmine Nabor
- Best Libero: Melissa Gohing

PVL Reinforced Conference chronology
- < 2016 (SVL) 2018 >

PVL conference chronology
- < 2016 Reinforced Open (SVL) 2017 Open >

The women's division of the 2017 Premier Volleyball League Reinforced Conference was the first conference of the Premier Volleyball League and the 2017 season. The conference started on April 30, 2017 and concluded on June 15, 2017. All elimination round games were played at the FilOil Flying V Centre in San Juan while the semifinals and Finals games were held at the PhilSports Arena in Pasig.

The women's tournament was supposed to feature the use of foreign reinforcements. However, they were initially unable to play due to difficulty in securing their international transfer certificates (ITC) from the FIVB. On May 17, 2017, Larong Volleyball sa Pilipinas, Inc. (LVPI) confirmed that the FIVB had approved the ITC requests for the imports. The imports began to play on May 18, 2017.

== Participating teams ==
2017 Premier Volleyball League Reinforced Conference – Women's division
Abbr.	Team	Affiliation	Head coach	Team captain	Import(s)
BLP	BaliPure Purest Water Defenders	Balibago Waterworks System, Inc.	(Philippines) Roger Gorayeb	(Philippines) Grethcel Soltones	(United States) Jennifer Brooke Keddy (Thailand) Jeng Bualee
CCS	Creamline Cool Smashers	Republic Biscuit Corporation	(Thailand) Tai Bundit	(Philippines) Alyssa Valdez	(United States) Laura Schaudt (Thailand) Kuttika Kaewpin
PAF	Philippine Air Force Jet Spikers	Philippine Air Force	(Philippines) Jasper Jimenez	(Philippines) Joy Cases	(Thailand) Patcharee Sangmuang
PER	Perlas Spikers	Beach Volleyball Republic	(Philippines) Jerry Yee	(Philippines) Dzi Gervacio	(Brazil) Rupia Inck (Japan) Naoko Hashimoto
POC	Pocari Sweat Lady Warriors	Federated Distributors, Inc.	(Philippines) Rommel John Abella	(Philippines) Gyzelle Sy	(Bosnia and Herzegovina) Edina Selimovic (United States) Michelle Strizak (United States) Krystal Rivers
PSM	Power Smashers	None	(Philippines) Ernesto Pamilar	(Philippines) Jovie Prado	(Thailand) Amporn Hyapha (Thailand) Kannika Thipachot

== Foreign players ==
Team	Player	Height	Country
Air Force	(Thailand) Patcharee Sangmuang	1.81 m (5 ft 11 in)	Thailand
BaliPure	(United States) Jennifer Brooke Keddy	1.93 m (6 ft 4 in)	United States
BaliPure	(Thailand) Jaroensri Bualee	1.76 m (5 ft 9 in)	Thailand
Perlas	(Brazil) Rupia Inck	1.86 m (6 ft 1 in)	Brazil
Perlas	(Japan) Naoko Hashimoto	1.72 m (5 ft 8 in)	Japan
Creamline	(Thailand) Kuttika Kaewpin	1.71 m (5 ft 7 in)	Thailand
Creamline	(United States) Laura Schaudt	1.96 m (6 ft 5 in)	United States
Pocari Sweat	(Bosnia and Herzegovina) Edina Selimovic (replaced)	1.86 m (6 ft 1 in)	Bosnia and Herzegovina
Pocari Sweat	(United States) Michelle Strizak	1.85 m (6 ft 1 in)	United States
Pocari Sweat	(United States) Krystal Rivers	1.80 m (5 ft 11 in)	United States
Power Smashers	(Thailand) Amporn Hyapha	1.80 m (5 ft 11 in)	Thailand
Power Smashers	(Thailand) Kannika Thipachot	1.70 m (5 ft 7 in)	Thailand

== Format ==
Preliminary round

The six teams compete in a double round-robin tournament, with each team playing two matches against all other teams for a total of ten matches. The top two teams will advance to the semifinals while the bottom four will continue competing in the quarterfinals.

Quarterfinals

The bottom four teams from the preliminary round compete in a single round-robin tournament, with each team playing one match against all other teams for a total of three matches. The top two teams will advance to the semifinals while the bottom two will be eliminated and ranked 5th and 6th in the final standings.

Semifinals

The top two teams from the preliminary round and the top two from the quarterfinals compete in the semifinals. Teams compete in best-of-three series with the winners advancing to the finals while the losers will compete in the third place series. The match-ups for the semifinals are as follows:

- SF1: PR #1 vs. QF #2
- SF2: PR #2 vs. QF #1

Third place series

The losing teams from the semifinals compete in a best-of-three series to determine which team will finish third in this conference.

Finals

The winning teams from the semifinals compete in a best-of-three series to determine the conference champions. The losing team in this round will be declared conference runners-up.

== Pool standing procedure ==
Teams are initially ranked by wins followed by match points. A win awards three points if the match lasted for three or four sets (3–0 or 3–1), or two points if the match lasted for five sets (3–2). A loss only awards one point if the match lasted for five sets (2–3).

If multiple teams tie for wins and match points, the next criteria are set ratio (the number of sets won divided by number of sets lost across all matches) and point ratio (the number of points won divided by number of points lost across all matches). If any teams are still tied, the procedure will be applied again, but only considering matches between the remaining tied teams.

== Preliminary round ==
Pos	Team	Pld	W	L	Pts	SW	SL	SR	SPW	SPL	SPR	Qualification
1	BaliPure Purest Water Defenders	10	7	3	21	25	16	1.563	919	876	1.049	Semifinals
2	Power Smashers	10	6	4	17	21	17	1.235	859	843	1.019	Semifinals
3	Pocari Sweat Lady Warriors	10	6	4	17	21	17	1.235	814	817	0.996	
4	Perlas Spikers	10	5	5	16	22	20	1.100	921	925	0.996	
5	Creamline Cool Smashers	10	4	6	14	21	22	0.955	944	919	1.027	
6	Philippine Air Force Jet Spikers	10	2	8	5	10	28	0.357	796	873	0.912	

Rules for classification: 3 points = win match in 3 or 4 sets; 2 points = win match in 5 sets; 1 point = lose match in 5 sets; 0 point = lose match in 3 or 4 sets

=== Match results ===
- All times are in Philippines Standard Time (UTC+08:00)

Date	Time		Score		Set 1	Set 2	Set 3	Set 4	Set 5	Total	Report
Apr 30	15:00	Philippine Air Force Jet Spikers	1–3	BaliPure Purest Water Defenders	25–21	19–25	19–25	21–25	–	84–96	P2
Apr 30	17:00	Power Smashers	3–0	Pocari Sweat Lady Warriors	25–9	25–22	25–21	–	–	75–52	P2
Apr 30	19:00	Creamline Cool Smashers	1–3	Perlas Spikers	25–23	22–25	19–25	21–25	–	87–98	P2
May 02	16:00	BaliPure Purest Water Defenders	3–1	Power Smashers	17–25	26–24	25–23	25–22	–	93–94	P2
May 02	18:30	Perlas Spikers	2–3	Philippine Air Force Jet Spikers	24–26	21–25	25–23	25–19	13–15	108–108	P2
May 04	16:00	Philippine Air Force Jet Spikers	0–3	Creamline Cool Smashers	23–25	16–25	22–25	–	–	61–75	P2
May 04	18:30	BaliPure Purest Water Defenders	3–0	Pocari Sweat Lady Warriors	25–23	25–22	25–14	–	–	75–59	P2
May 06	16:00	Perlas Spikers	3–2	Power Smashers	29–31	24–26	25–19	25–23	21–19	124–118	P2
May 06	18:30	Pocari Sweat Lady Warriors	3–0	Philippine Air Force Jet Spikers	25–22	25–14	25–22	–	–	75–58	P2
May 09	16:00	Perlas Spikers	0–3	Pocari Sweat Lady Warriors	19–25	19–25	19–25	–	–	57–75	P2
May 09	18:30	Power Smashers	3–2	Creamline Cool Smashers	25–23	21–25	25–17	20–25	15–13	106–103	P2
May 11	16:00	Philippine Air Force Jet Spikers	0–3	Power Smashers	23–25	20–25	22–25	–	–	65–75	P2
May 11	18:30	Creamline Cool Smashers	1–3	Pocari Sweat Lady Warriors	25–15	18–25	24–26	19–25	–	86–91	P2
May 13	13:00	BaliPure Purest Water Defenders	2–3	Perlas Spikers	25–22	25–22	22–25	16–25	12–15	100–109	P2
May 13	16:00	Pocari Sweat Lady Warriors	3–0	Power Smashers	25–21	25–20	25–16	–	–	75–57	P2
May 13	18:30	Philippine Air Force Jet Spikers	2–3	Creamline Cool Smashers	21–25	26–28	25–23	25–12	12–15	109–103	P2
May 16	16:00	Creamline Cool Smashers	1–3	BaliPure Purest Water Defenders	24–26	25–17	23–25	26–28	–	98–96	P2
May 16	18:30	Pocari Sweat Lady Warriors	3–2	Perlas Spikers	25–17	25–17	22–25	18–25	15–3	105–87	P2
May 18	16:00	BaliPure Purest Water Defenders	2–3	Pocari Sweat Lady Warriors	25–18	25–21	24–26	25–27	13–15	112–107	P2
May 18	18:30	Perlas Spikers	3–0	Philippine Air Force Jet Spikers	25–23	26–24	25–13	–	–	76–60	P2
May 20	13:00	Power Smashers	0–3	Perlas Spikers	25–27	24–26	19–25	–	–	68–78	P2
May 20	16:00	Philippine Air Force Jet Spikers	0–3	BaliPure Purest Water Defenders	17–25	12–25	17–25	–	–	46–75	P2
May 20	18:30	Pocari Sweat Lady Warriors	1–3	Creamline Cool Smashers	25–21	18–25	20–25	13–25	–	76–96	P2
May 21	16:00	Perlas Spikers	2–3	BaliPure Purest Water Defenders	21–25	23–25	25–16	27–25	10–15	106–106	P2
May 21	18:30	Creamline Cool Smashers	2–3	Power Smashers	25–17	22–25	18–25	25–18	10–15	100–100	P2
May 23	16:00	Power Smashers	3–1	Philippine Air Force Jet Spikers	25–23	16–25	25–20	25–23	–	91–91	P2
May 23	18:30	BaliPure Purest Water Defenders	3–2	Creamline Cool Smashers	20–25	25–19	19–25	25–18	15–7	104–94	P2
May 25	13:00	Philippine Air Force Jet Spikers	3–2	Pocari Sweat Lady Warriors	25–19	24–26	25–27	25–21	15–6	114–99	P2
May 25	16:00	Power Smashers	3–0	BaliPure Purest Water Defenders	25–20	25–23	25–19	–	–	75–62	P2
May 25	18:30	Creamline Cool Smashers	3–1	Perlas Spikers	25–19	25–20	23–25	25–14	–	98–78	P2

== Quarterfinals ==
Pos	Team	Pld	W	L	Pts	SW	SL	SR	SPW	SPL	SPR	Qualification
1	Pocari Sweat Lady Warriors	3	3	0	7	9	4	2.250	284	260	1.092	Semifinals
2	Creamline Cool Smashers	3	2	1	6	8	5	1.600	272	253	1.075	Semifinals
3	Perlas Spikers	3	1	2	3	5	8	0.625	265	263	1.008	
4	Philippine Air Force Jet Spikers	3	0	3	2	4	9	0.444	251	296	0.848	

Rules for classification: 3 points = win match in 3 or 4 sets; 2 points = win match in 5 sets; 1 point = lose match in 5 sets; 0 point = lose match in 3 or 4 sets

=== Match results ===
Date	Time		Score		Set 1	Set 2	Set 3	Set 4	Set 5	Total	Report
May 27	16:00	Pocari Sweat Lady Warriors	3–2	Philippine Air Force Jet Spikers	21–25	25–23	19–25	25–14	15–10	105–97	P2
May 27	18:30	Perlas Spikers	2–3	Creamline Cool Smashers	16–25	25–9	25–17	13–25	13–15	92–91	P2
May 30	16:00	Creamline Cool Smashers	2–3	Pocari Sweat Lady Warriors	23–25	21–25	25–21	25–18	11–15	105–104	P2
May 30	18:30	Philippine Air Force Jet Spikers	2–3	Perlas Spikers	26–24	15–25	28–26	20–25	8–15	97–115	P2
Jun 01	16:00	Creamline Cool Smashers	3–0	Philippine Air Force Jet Spikers	25–16	26–24	25–17	–	–	76–57	P2
Jun 01	18:30	Pocari Sweat Lady Warriors	3–0	Perlas Spikers	25–23	25–15	25–18	–	–	75–56	P2

== Semifinals ==
- All series are best-of-3

Semifinals
1	BaliPure Purest Water Defenders	3	2	3
4	Creamline Cool Smashers	1	3	0
2	Power Smashers	2	3	0
3	Pocari Sweat Lady Warriors	3	2	3

Finals
BaliPure Purest Water Defenders	1	3	1
Pocari Sweat Lady Warriors	3	2	3
3rd place
Creamline Cool Smashers	3	3	–
Power Smashers	0	1	–

=== Rank 1 vs Rank 4 ===
Date	Time		Score		Set 1	Set 2	Set 3	Set 4	Set 5	Total	Report
Jun 03	16:00	BaliPure Purest Water Defenders	3–1	Creamline Cool Smashers	22–25	25–23	25–14	25–21	–	97–83	P2
Jun 06	18:30	Creamline Cool Smashers	3–2	BaliPure Purest Water Defenders	24–26	25–18	18–25	25–16	16–14	108–99	P2
Jun 08	16:00	BaliPure Purest Water Defenders	3–0	Creamline Cool Smashers	25–18	25–13	25–16	–	–	75–47	P2

=== Rank 2 vs Rank 3 ===
Date	Time		Score		Set 1	Set 2	Set 3	Set 4	Set 5	Total	Report
Jun 03	18:30	Power Smashers	2–3	Pocari Sweat Lady Warriors	23–25	19–25	25–23	25–22	12–15	104–110	P2
Jun 06	16:00	Pocari Sweat Lady Warriors	2–3	Power Smashers	26–24	25–22	18–25	23–25	13–15	105–111	P2
Jun 08	18:30	Power Smashers	0–3	Pocari Sweat Lady Warriors	19–25	22–25	21–25	–	–	62–75	P2

== Finals ==
=== 3rd Place ===
Date	Time		Score		Set 1	Set 2	Set 3	Set 4	Set 5	Total	Report
Jun 10	16:00	Creamline Cool Smashers	3–0	Power Smashers	25–20	25–18	25–15	–	–	75–53	P2
Jun 13	16:00	Power Smashers	1–3	Creamline Cool Smashers	20–25	11–25	25–20	19–25	–	75–95	P2

=== Championship ===
Date	Time		Score		Set 1	Set 2	Set 3	Set 4	Set 5	Total	Report
Jun 10	18:30	BaliPure Purest Water Defenders	1–3	Pocari Sweat Lady Warriors	25–22	22–25	22–25	24–26	–	93–98	P2
Jun 13	18:30	Pocari Sweat Lady Warriors	2–3	BaliPure Purest Water Defenders	15–25	24–26	26–24	26–24	13–15	104–114	P2
Jun 15	18:30	BaliPure Purest Water Defenders	1–3	Pocari Sweat Lady Warriors	25–20	17–25	17–25	19–25	–	78–95	P2

2017 PVL Reinforced Open Conference
Women's Division champions
Pocari Sweat Lady Warriors

Team roster
Shola Alvarez, Jessey de Leon, Michelle Strizak (I), Melissa Gohing, Sarah Espelita, Jeanette Panaga, Maricar Nepomuceno,
Elaine Kasilag, Gyzelle Sy (c), Krystal Rivers (I), Edina Sellimovic (I), Fille Cainglet-Cayetano, Desiree Dadang, Gayle Valdez, Myla Pablo
Head coach
(Philippines) Rommel Abella

== Awards ==
Award		Recipient
MVP	Finals: Conference:	(Philippines) Myla Pablo (Pocari Sweat) (Philippines) Alyssa Valdez (Creamline)
Best Setter		(Philippines) Jasmine Nabor (BaliPure)
Best Outside Spiker	1st: 2nd:	(Philippines) Alyssa Valdez (Creamline) (Philippines) Grethcel Soltones (BaliPure)
Best Middle Blocker	1st: 2nd:	(Philippines) Risa Sato (BaliPure) (Philippines) Jeanette Panaga (Pocari Sweat)
Best Opposite Spiker		(Philippines) Dimdim Pacres (Power Smashers)
Best Libero		(Philippines) Melissa Gohing (Pocari Sweat)
Best Import		(United States) Michelle Strizak (Pocari Sweat)

== Final standings ==
Rank	Team
1st place, gold medalist(s)	Pocari Sweat Lady Warriors
2nd place, silver medalist(s)	BaliPure Purest Water Defenders
3rd place, bronze medalist(s)	Creamline Cool Smashers
4	Power Smashers
5	Perlas Spikers
6	Philippine Air Force Jet Spikers
