= Naoko Hashimoto =

Japanese volleyball player

Personal information
- Full name: Naoko Hashimoto
- Nickname: Mook
- Born: July 11, 1984 (age 42); Okayama, Okayama, Japan
- Height: 1.72 m (5 ft 8 in)
- Weight: 63 kg (139 lb)
- Spike: 296 cm (117 in)

Volleyball information
- Position: Setter
- Current club: Il Bisonte Firenze

National team
2013-	Japan
Medal record
Women's volleyball
Representing Japan
Asian Championship
Silver medal – second place	2013 Nakhon Ratchasima	Team

Naoko Hashimoto (橋本直子 Hashimoto Naoko, born July 11, 1984) is a Japanese volleyball player who plays for Il Bisonte Firenze.

== Career ==
Hashimoto debuted with the senior national team in 2013.

== Clubs ==
- (Japan) Hisamitsu Springs (2003-2009)
- (Sweden) Ängelholms (2009–2011)
- (Japan) JT Marvelous (2011–12)
- (Switzerland) Voléro Zürich (2012–13)
- (Japan) JT Marvelous (2013–14)
- (Romania) CSM Volei Alba Blaj (2014)
- (Thailand) Bangkok Glass (2015)
- (Japan) Hitachi Rivale (2015–2016)
- (Philippines) Perlas Spikers (2016–2017)
- (Romania) CSM București (2017–present)

== Honours ==
=== Team ===
- 2005-06 V.Premier League - Runner-Up, with Hisamitsu Springs.
- 2006 Kurowashiki All Japan Volleyball Tournament - Champion, with Hisamitsu Springs.
- 2006-07 V.Premier League - Champion, with Hisamitsu Springs.
- 2007 Kurowashiki All Japan Volleyball Tournament - Champion, with Hisamitsu Springs.
- 2007 Empress' Cup - Runner-Up, with Hisamitsu Springs.
- 2012 Kurowashiki All Japan Volleyball Tournament - Champion, with JT Marvelous.

=== Individual ===
- 2007 2006-07 V.Premier League: Best 6
- 2012 Kurowashiki All Japan Volleyball Tournament Best 6

=== National team ===
- 2013 Asian Championship - Silver medal
