= BaliPure Purest Water Defenders =

Women's volleyball team in the Philippines

- Full name: BaliPure Purest Water Defenders
- Short name: BaliPure
- Nickname: Water Defenders
- Founded: 2016
- Dissolved: 2022
- League: Premier Volleyball League

Uniforms
Home	Away

Championships
- Premier Volleyball League: 1 (2017 Open)

The BaliPure Purest Water Defenders were a professional volleyball club sponsored by Balibago Waterworks System, Inc. playing in the Premier Volleyball League (formerly, Shakey's V-League).

== History ==
The BaliPure Purest Water Defenders joined the Premier Volleyball League (PVL) when it was still known as the Shakey's V-League (SVL). Its first tournament was the 2016 Open Conference.

The SVL became the PVL for the 2017 season. Balipure finished as runners-up to the Pocari Sweat Lady Warriors in the 2017 Reinforced Conference before winning the 2017 Open Conference at Pocari's expense.

In the 2021 season, the PVL became a professional league. There were concerns that BaliPure cannot professionalize since their roster consisted of college players putting their status within the PVL in question.

They were still able to take part at the 2021 and 2022 Open Conferences. The team is now defunct.

== Honors ==
Team:

Season	Conference	Title
2016	Open	3rd Place
2016	Reinforced	3rd Place
2017	Reinforced	Runner-up
2017	Open	Champions
2018	Reinforced	6th place
2018	Open	did not compete
2019	Reinforced	6th place
2019	Open	8th place
2021	Open	8th place
2022	Open	9th place
2022	Invitational	did not compete

Individual:

Season	Conference	Award	Name
2016	Open	Most Valuable Player (Conference)	(Philippines) Grethcel Soltones
2016	Open	1st Best Outside Spiker	(Philippines) Alyssa Valdez
2016	Reinforced	Best Libero	(Philippines) Dennise Michelle Lazaro
2017	Reinforced	Best Setter	(Philippines) Jasmine Nabor
2017	Reinforced	2nd Best Outside Spiker	(Philippines) Grethcel Soltones
2017	Reinforced	1st Best Middle Blocker	(Japan) Risa Sato
2017	Reinforced	Best Import (Conference)	(United States) Jennifer Brooke Keddy
2017	Open	Most Valuable Player (Finals)	(Philippines) Grethcel Soltones
2017	Open	2nd Best Outside Spiker	(Philippines) Grethcel Soltones
2017	Open	2nd Best Middle Blocker	(Japan) Risa Sato

== Imports ==
Season	Number	Player	Country
2016	6	Kaylee Manns	United States
2016	7	Kate Morrell	United States
2017	7	Jaroensri Bualee	Thailand
2017	8	Jennifer Brooke Keddy	United States
2018	7	Alexis Mathews	United States
2018	10	Janisa Johnson	United States
2019	5	Alexandra Vajdovä	Slovakia
2019	11	Danijela Dzakovic	Montenegro

== Team captains ==
- (Philippines) Alyssa Valdez (2016)
- (United States) Kaylee Manns (2016)
- (Philippines) Grethcel Soltones (2017)
- (Philippines) Jasmine Nabor (2017)
- (Philippines) Joyme Cagande (2018)
- (Philippines) Grazielle Bombita (2019)
- (Philippines) Alina Bicar (2021–2022)

== Head coaches ==
- (Philippines) Charo Soriano (2016, playing head coach)
- (Thailand) Tai Bundit (2016)
- (Philippines) Roger Gorayeb (2017)
- (Philippines) Raymund Castillo (2018)
- (Philippines) Rommel Abella (2019–2022)

== Notable players ==
Local players

- Alina Bicar
- Geneveve Casugod
- Charo Soriano
- Grethcel Soltones
- Dzi Gervacio
- Janine Marciano
- Jem Ferrer
- Dennise Lazaro
- Ella de Jesus
- Sue Roces
- Alyssa Valdez
- Risa Sato
- Tatan Pantone

Foreign players

Montenegro

- Danijela Dzakovic

New Zealand

- Amy Ahomiro

Slovakia

- Alexandra Vajdovä

Thailand

- Jaroensri Bualee

United States

- Kaylee Manns
- Kate Morell
- Jennifer Keddy
- Janisa Johnson
- Alexis Matthews
