= Krystal Rivers =

US volleyball player (born 1994)

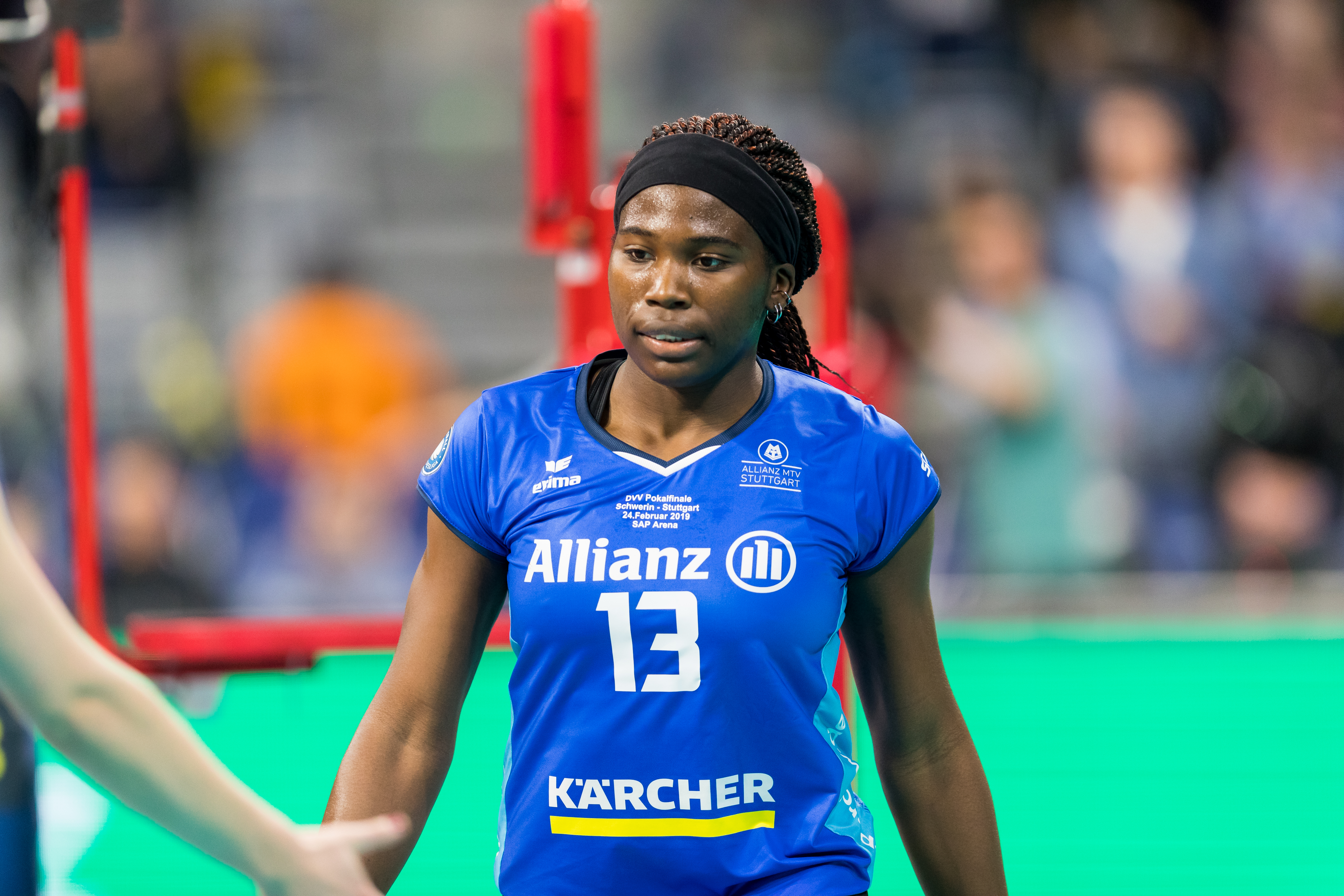
in 2019 by Sven Mandel

Krystal Rivers (born 23 May 1994 in Birmingham, Alabama) is an American volleyball player. With her current club Allianz MTV Stuttgart, she won the German championship twice, and reached the final of the CEV Cup (European Cup).

With the United States women's national volleyball team, she competed at the 2018 Pan American Volleyball Cup.

== Life ==
From 2012 to 2016, she attended the University of Alabama and played on the varsity team.

In the 2017/18 season, the attacker appeared in the French league with Béziers Volley and won the national championship with the team.

She then moved to German Bundesliga club Allianz MTV Stuttgart. With the club, she reached the final of the 2018/19 DVV Cup, which was lost to SSC Palmberg Schwerin. In the playoff final against the same club, she became German champion. She was named the league's MVP.

In the 2019/20 DVV Cup, she again reached the final which Stuttgart lost to Dresdner SC. As the Bundesliga season was canceled shortly before the playoffs, the team was in second place in the table. Rivers also played for Stuttgart in the 2020/21 season. In the 2021/22 season she achieved the double with her club: she became German champion and German cup winner.

== Clubs ==
France Béziers Volley	2017-2018
Germany Allianz MTV Stuttgart	2018-
