= 2016 Shakey's V-League Reinforced Open Conference =

Shakey's V-League 13th Season Reinforced Open Conference
- League: Shakey's V-League
- Sport: Volleyball
- Games: 37
- Teams: 8
- TV partner: ABS-CBN Sports and Action
- Season MVP: Alyssa Valdez

Final
- Champions: Pocari Sweat Lady Warriors
- Runners-up: Bureau of Customs Transformers
- Finals MVP: Michele Gumabao

Shakey's V-League seasons
- ← 2016 Collegiate 2022 (V-League) 2017 Reinforced (PVL) →

The 2016 Shakey's V-League Reinforced Open Conference was the 28th conference of the Shakey's V-League and the third and final conference of the 2016 season. Conference started October 1, 2016 at the PhilSports Arena in Pasig.

It is also the last conference of the SVL. As the league would be rebranded as the Premier Volleyball League from 2017 onwards. The SVL would later be relaunched as the V-League in 2022.

== Participating teams ==
Abbr.	Team
BLP	BaliPure Purest Water Defenders
BOC	Bureau of Customs Transformers
LAG	Laoag Power Smashers
PAF	Philippine Air Force Jet Spikers
PCG	Philippine Coast Guard Lady Dolphins
POC	Pocari Sweat Lady Warriors
UPD	University of the Philippines Lady Maroons
UST	University of Santo Tomas Tigresses

== Format ==
The conference format as it follows:

- Preliminaries

- Single round robin preliminary

- Semifinals

- Top four teams after preliminary round will enter the semifinals round.
- They will compete against each other in a best-of-three series as follows: Rank 1 vs Rank 4 and Rank 2 vs Rank 3.

- Finals

- Best-of-three series for the Final and Bronze matches.

== Preliminary round ==
=== Team standings ===
Pos	Team	Pld	W	L	Pts	SW	SL	SR	SPW	SPL	SPR	Qualification
1	Pocari Sweat Lady Warriors	7	6	1	19	20	5	4.000	574	484	1.186	Semifinals
2	BaliPure Purest Water Defenders	7	5	2	17	19	6	3.167	540	452	1.195	Semifinals
3	Bureau of Customs Transformers	7	5	2	14	17	9	1.889	554	513	1.080	Semifinals
4	UST Growling Tigresses	7	5	2	14	16	10	1.600	592	548	1.080	Semifinals
5	UP Lady Maroons	7	3	4	9	9	13	0.692	476	483	0.986	
6	Laoag Power Smashers	7	2	5	8	11	16	0.688	590	593	0.995	
7	Philippine Air Force Jet Spikers	7	2	5	5	9	17	0.529	550	567	0.970	
8	Philippine Coast Guard Lady Dolphins	7	0	7	0	0	21	0.000	289	525	0.550	

=== Match results ===
Date	Time		Score		Set 1	Set 2	Set 3	Set 4	Set 5	Total	Report
Oct 01	16:00	PCG	0–3	LAG	8–25	15–25	16–25			39–75	
Oct 01	18:00	PAF	1–3	UST	15–25	25–20	13–25	21–25		74–95	
Oct 03	16:00	UST	3–0	PCG	25–16	25–10	25–23			75–49	
Oct 03	18:00	UPD	0–3	BOC	23–25	18–25	22–25			63–75	
Oct 05	16:00	POC	2–3	PAF	20–25	25–22	7–25	25–22	12–15	89–109	
Oct 05	18:00	BOC	3–2	LAG	18–25	27–25	21–25	25–21	15–9	106–105	
Oct 08	16:00	PCG	0–3	UPD	10–25	19–25	15–25			44–75	
Oct 08	18:00	UST	3–1	BLP	21–25	25–21	25–23	25–13		96–82	
Oct 10	16:00	POC	3–0	PCG	25–17	25–9	25–16			75–42	
Oct 10	18:00	UPD	0–3	UST	26–28	19–25	18–25			63–78	
Oct 12	16:00	LAG	3–1	PAF	20–25	26–24	25–21	26–24		97–94	
Oct 12	18:00	BLP	3–0	BOC	26–24	25–21	25–21			76–66	
Oct 15	16:00	BOC	3–0	UST	25–17	26–24	25–15			76–56	
Oct 15	18:00	UPD	0–3	POC	20–25	16–25	23–25			59–75	
Oct 17	16:00	PAF	0–3	BLP	22–25	19–25	21–25			62–75	
Oct 17	18:00	LAG	1–3	UPD	20–25	25–27	25–11	20–25		90–88	
Oct 19	16:00	PCG	0–3	PAF	11–25	19–25	8–25			38–75	
Oct 19	18:00	UST	3–2	LAG	22–25	27–25	25–18	25–27	15–12	114–107	
Oct 22	16:00	UPD	0–3	BLP	13–25	23–25	17–25			53–75	
Oct 22	18:00	POC	3–0	BOC	25–22	25–22	25–14			75–58	
Oct 24	16:00	LAG	0–3	POC	13–25	20–25	24–26			57–76	
Oct 24	18:00	PAF	0–3	UPD	16–25	20–25	10–25			46–75	
Oct 26	16:00	BOC	3–0	PCG	25–18	25–12	25–18			75–48	
Oct 26	18:00	BLP	3–0	LAG	25–22	26–24	25–13			76–59	
Oct 29	16:00	POC	3–1	BLP	25–16	12–25	25–21	25–19		87–81	
Oct 29	18:00	PAF	1–3	BOC	25–23	21–25	23–25	21–25		90–98	
Nov 02	16:00	BLP	3–0	PCG	25–12	25–8	25–9			75–29	
Nov 02	18:00	UST	1–3	POC	16–25	23–25	25–22	14–25		78–97	

== Semifinals ==
- Ranking is based from the preliminary round.
- All series are best-of-3

Semifinals
1	Pocari Sweat Lady Warriors	3	3
4	UST Growling Tigresses	0	2
2	BaliPure Purest Water Defenders	3	1	2
3	Bureau of Customs Transformers	0	3	3

Finals
Pocari Sweat Lady Warriors	3	3
Bureau of Customs Transformers	0	1
3rd place
BaliPure Purest Water Defenders	3	3
UST Growling Tigresses	1	0

=== Rank 1 vs Rank 4 ===
Date	Time		Score		Set 1	Set 2	Set 3	Set 4	Set 5	Total	Report
Nov 5	19:00	POC	3–0	UST	25–16	25–18	25–22			75–56	P2
Nov 7	16:00	UST	2–3	POC	17–25	26–24	24–26	27–25	8–15	102–115	P2

=== Rank 2 vs Rank 3 ===
Date	Time		Score		Set 1	Set 2	Set 3	Set 4	Set 5	Total	Report
Nov 5	14:00	BOC	0–3	BLP	19–25	18–25	21–25			58–75	P2
Nov 7	19:00	BLP	1–3	BOC	19–25	25–15	20–25	17–25		81–90	P2
Nov 9	19:00	BOC	3–2	BLP	25–21	25–16	24–26	8–25	15–8	97–96	P2

== Finals ==
=== 3rd Place ===
Date	Time		Score		Set 1	Set 2	Set 3	Set 4	Set 5	Total	Report
Nov 12	16:00	BLP	3–1	UST	19–25	25–16	25–18	25–18		94–77	P2
Nov 14	16:00	UST	0–3	BLP	23–25	19–25	11–25			53–75	P2

=== Championship ===
Date	Time		Score		Set 1	Set 2	Set 3	Set 4	Set 5	Total	Report
Nov 12	19:00	BOC	0–3	POC	22–25	18–25	18–25			58–75	P2
Nov 14	19:00	POC	3–1	BOC	25–14	25–10	22–25	25–23		97–72	P2

== Awards ==
- Most Valuable Player (Finals)
  - Michele Gumabao (POC)
- Most Valuable Player (Conference)
  - Alyssa Valdez (BOC)
- Best Setter
  - Iris Janelle Tolenada (POC)
- Best Outside Spikers
  - Alyssa Valdez (BOC)
  - Ennajie Laure (UST)
- Best Middle Blockers
  - Marivic Meneses (UST)
  - Lilet Mabbayad (BOC)
- Best Opposite Spiker
  - Michele Gumabao (POC)
- Best Libero
  - Dennise Lazaro (BLP)
- Best Foreign Guest Player
  - Breanna Lee Mackie (POC)

== See also ==
- Premier Volleyball League
- Shakey's Super League
- V-League (Philippines)
