= 2017 Premier Volleyball League Open Conference =

Second conference of the 2017 PVL season

- Duration: July 1 – August 16, 2017
- Teams: 8
- TV partner(s): ABS-CBN Sports and Action

Results
- Champions: BaliPure Purest Water Defenders
- Runners-up: Pocari Sweat Lady Warriors
- Third place: Creamline Cool Smashers
- Fourth place: Hair Fairy Air Force Jet Spikers

Awards
- Conference MVP: Myla Pablo
- Finals MVP: Grethcel Soltones
- Best OH: Myla Pablo; Grethcel Soltones
- Best MB: Jeanette Panaga; Risa Sato
- Best OPP: Iari Yongco
- Best Setter: Jia Morado
- Best Libero: Melissa Gohing

PVL Open Conference chronology
- < 2016 (SVL) 2018 >

PVL conference chronology
- < 2017 Reinforced 2017 Collegiate >

The women's division of the 2017 Premier Volleyball League Open Conference was the second conference of the Premier Volleyball League and the 2017 season. The conference started on July 1, 2017 at the Filoil Flying V Centre, San Juan. The tournament will have two guest teams from the collegiate level: Adamson Lady Falcons and UP Fighting Lady Maroons.

== Participating teams ==
Premier Volleyball League 1st Season Open Conference (Women's Division)
Abbr.	Team	Company	Head coach	Team captain
ADU	Adamson–Akari Lady Falcons	Adamson University / Akari Lighting & Technology Corporation (sponsor)	(United States) Airess Padda	Jema Galanza
BLP	BaliPure Purest Water Defenders	Balibago Waterworks System, Inc.	(Philippines) Roger Gorayeb	Jasmine Nabor
CCS	Creamline Cool Smashers	Republic Biscuit Corporation	(Thailand) Tai Bundit	Alyssa Valdez
PAF	Hair Fairy Air Force Jet Spikers	Philippine Air Force / Hair Fairy Dry Shampoo (sponsor)	(Philippines) Jasper Jimenez	Joy Cases
PER	BanKo Perlas Spikers	Beach Volleyball Republic / BPI Direct BanKo, Inc. (sponsor)	(Thailand) Matinai Muhammad	Sue Roces
POC	Pocari Sweat Lady Warriors	Federated Distributors, Inc.	(Philippines) Rico de Guzman	Gyzelle Sy
PSM	Power Smashers	Bristol	(Philippines) Ernesto Pamilar	Jovie Prado
UP	UP Fighting Lady Maroons	University of the Philippines	(Philippines) Jerry Yee	Tots Carlos

== Format ==
Preliminary round

The eights teams compete in a single round-robin tournament, with each team playing one match against all other teams for a total of seven matches. The top four teams will advance to the semifinals while the bottom four will be eliminated and ranked 5th through 8th in the final standings.

Semifinals

The top four teams from prelims compete in the semifinals. Teams compete in best-of-three series with the winners advancing to the finals while the losers will compete in the third place series. The match-ups for the semifinals are as follows:

- SF1: PR #1 vs. PR #4
- SF2: PR #2 vs. PR #3

Third place series

The losing teams from the semifinals compete in a best-of-three series to determine which team will finish third in this conference.

Finals

The winning teams from the semifinals compete in a best-of-three series to determine the conference champions. The losing team in this round will be declared conference runners-up.

== Pool standing procedure ==
Teams are initially ranked by wins followed by match points. A win awards three points if the match lasted for three or four sets (3–0 or 3–1), or two points if the match lasted for five sets (3–2). A loss only awards one point if the match lasted for five sets (2–3).

If multiple teams tie for wins and match points, the next criteria are set ratio (the number of sets won divided by number of sets lost across all matches) and point ratio (the number of points won divided by number of points lost across all matches). If any teams are still tied, the procedure will be applied again, but only considering matches between the remaining tied teams.

== Preliminary round ==
Pos	Team	Pld	W	L	Pts	SW	SL	SR	SPW	SPL	SPR	Qualification
1	Creamline Cool Smashers	7	7	0	20	21	7	3.000	669	593	1.128	Semifinals
2	Pocari Sweat Lady Warriors	7	5	2	14	16	10	1.600	596	564	1.057	Semifinals
3	Philippine Air Force Jet Spikers	7	5	2	13	16	11	1.455	588	598	0.983	Semifinals
4	BaliPure Purest Water Defenders	7	4	3	13	17	12	1.417	646	620	1.042	Semifinals
5	BanKo Perlas Spikers	7	3	4	9	14	16	0.875	683	658	1.038	
6	UP Lady Maroons	7	2	5	6	10	18	0.556	614	631	0.973	
7	Power Smashers	7	1	6	6	12	20	0.600	654	707	0.925	
8	Adamson Lady Falcons	7	1	6	3	7	19	0.368	539	618	0.872	

Rules for classification: 3 points = win match in 3 or 4 sets; 2 points = win match in 5 sets; 1 point = lose match in 5 sets; 0 point = lose match in 3 or 4 sets
- All times are in Philippine Standard Time (UTC+08:00)

Date	Time		Score		Set 1	Set 2	Set 3	Set 4	Set 5	Total	Report
Jul 01	16:00	Creamline Cool Smashers	3–1	Adamson–Akari Lady Falcons	25–17	18–25	25–15	25–22	–	93–79	P–2
Jul 01	18:30	BanKo Perlas Spikers	1–3	Hair Fairy Air Force Jet Spikers	23–25	25–9	20–25	20–25	–	88–84	P–2
Jul 02	16:00	UP Fighting Lady Maroons	1–3	Pocari Sweat Lady Warriors	25–21	20–25	18–25	21–25	–	84–96	P–2
Jul 02	18:30	Power Smashers	2–3	BaliPure Purest Water Defenders	15–25	25–22	25–20	19–25	6–15	90–107	P–2
Jul 05	16:00	Pocari Sweat Lady Warriors	3–1	BanKo Perlas Spikers	25–21	22–25	25–19	28–26	–	100–91	P–2
Jul 05	18:30	BaliPure Purest Water Defenders	1–3	Creamline Cool Smashers	19–25	30–28	19–25	29–31	–	97–109	P–2a
Jul 08	16:00	UP Fighting Lady Maroons	0–3	BaliPure Purest Water Defenders	23–25	21–25	23–25	–	–	67–75	P–2
Jul 08	18:30	Pocari Sweat Lady Warriors	3–2	Power Smashers	25–19	25–21	23–25	20–25	15–11	108–101	P–2
Jul 09	16:00	BanKo Perlas Spikers	3–1	Adamson–Akari Lady Falcons	25–18	25–16	21–25	25–21	–	96–80	P–2
Jul 09	18:30	Creamline Cool Smashers	3–1	Hair Fairy Air Force Jet Spikers	25–19	25–22	22–25	25–12	–	97–78	P–2
Jul 12	16:00	Hair Fairy Air Force Jet Spikers	3–0	UP Fighting Lady Maroons	29–27	25–16	25–22	–	–	79–65	P–2
Jul 12	18:30	Adamson–Akari Lady Falcons	3–1	Power Smashers	25–20	24–26	25–19	25–22	–	99–87	P–2
Jul 15	16:00	Pocari Sweat Lady Warriors	1–3	Creamline Cool Smashers	15–25	25–17	19–25	19–25	–	78–92	P–2
Jul 15	18:30	Power Smashers	3–2	BanKo Perlas Spikers	25–22	16–25	26–24	23–25	15–12	105–108	P–2
Jul 16	16:00	Hair Fairy Air Force Jet Spikers	3–2	BaliPure Purest Water Defenders	23–25	25–21	25–19	18–25	15–11	106–101	P–2
Jul 16	18:30	UP Fighting Lady Maroons	3–1	Adamson–Akari Lady Falcons	23–25	25–20	25–13	25–22	–	98–80	P–2 b
Jul 19	16:00	Creamline Cool Smashers	3–0	Power Smashers	25–22	25–21	25–22	–	–	75–65	P–2
Jul 19	18:30	BanKo Perlas Spikers	3–1	UP Fighting Lady Maroons	30–28	21–25	25–21	25–18	–	101–92	P–2
Jul 22	16:00	BaliPure Purest Water Defenders	2–3	BanKo Perlas Spikers	26–24	25–13	13–25	22–25	11–15	97–102	P–2
Jul 22	18:30	UP Fighting Lady Maroons	2–3	Creamline Cool Smashers	25–19	25–18	18–25	17–25	14–16	99–103	P–2
Jul 23	16:00	Hair Fairy Air Force Jet Spikers	3–2	Power Smashers	25–22	26–24	18–25	17–25	15–13	101–109	P–2
Jul 23	18:30	Adamson–Akari Lady Falcons	0–3	Pocari Sweat Lady Warriors	23–25	14–25	19–25	–	–	56–75	P–2 c
Jul 26	16:00	BaliPure Purest Water Defenders	3–1	Adamson–Akari Lady Falcons	25–18	25–23	19–25	25–20	–	94–86	P–2
Jul 26	18:30	Pocari Sweat Lady Warriors	3–0	Hair Fairy Air Force Jet Spikers	25–19	25–20	29–27	–	–	79–66	P–2
Jul 29	16:00	Power Smashers	2–3	UP Fighting Lady Maroons	17–25	25–21	25–23	19–25	11–15	97–109	P–2
Jul 29	18:30	Adamson–Akari Lady Falcons	0–3	Hair Fairy Air Force Jet Spikers	22–25	16–25	21–25	–	–	59–75	P–2
Jul 30	16:00	Creamline Cool Smashers	3–1	BanKo Perlas Spikers	21–25	25–22	26–24	28–26	–	100–97	P–2
Jul 30	18:30	BaliPure Purest Water Defenders	3–0	Pocari Sweat Lady Warriors	25–21	25–16	25–23	–	–	75–60	P–2 d

== Final round ==
- All series are best-of-3

Semifinals
1	Creamline Cool Smashers	3	2	0
4	BaliPure Purest Water Defenders	2	3	3
2	Pocari Sweat Lady Warriors	0	3	3
3	Philippine Air Force Jet Spikers	3	2	2

Finals
BaliPure Purest Water Defenders	3	3
Pocari Sweat Lady Warriors	0	1
3rd place
Creamline Cool Smashers	3	3
Philippine Air Force Jet Spikers	0	1

=== Semifinals ===
Rank 1 vs Rank 4

Date	Time		Score		Set 1	Set 2	Set 3	Set 4	Set 5	Total	Report
Aug 05	16:00	Creamline Cool Smashers	3–2	BaliPure Purest Water Defenders	25–19	13–25	28–26	18–25	15–7	99–102	P–2
Aug 06	18:30	BaliPure Purest Water Defenders	3–2	Creamline Cool Smashers	25–19	19–25	25–16	18–25	15–13	102–98	P–2
Aug 09	18:30	Creamline Cool Smashers	0–3	BaliPure Purest Water Defenders	22–25	25–27	23–25	–	–	70–77	P–2

Rank 2 vs Rank 3

Date	Time		Score		Set 1	Set 2	Set 3	Set 4	Set 5	Total	Report
Aug 05	18:30	Pocari Sweat Lady Warriors	0–3	Hair Fairy Air Force Jet Spikers	20–25	19–25	21–25	–	–	60–75	P–2
Aug 06	16:00	Hair Fairy Air Force Jet Spikers	2–3	Pocari Sweat Lady Warriors	22–25	25–16	25–23	21–25	12–15	105–104	P–2
Aug 09	16:00	Pocari Sweat Lady Warriors	3–2	Hair Fairy Air Force Jet Spikers	16–25	20–25	25–23	25–19	15–10	101–102	P–2

=== Finals ===
3rd Place

Date	Time		Score		Set 1	Set 2	Set 3	Set 4	Set 5	Total	Report
Aug 12	16:00	Creamline Cool Smashers	3–0	Hair Fairy Air Force Jet Spikers	25–16	25–21	25–19	–	–	75–56	P–2
Aug 16	16:00	Hair Fairy Air Force Jet Spikers	1–3	Creamline Cool Smashers	25–18	24–26	17–25	16–25	–	82–94	P–2

Championship

Date	Time		Score		Set 1	Set 2	Set 3	Set 4	Set 5	Total	Report
Aug 12	18:30	BaliPure Purest Water Defenders	3–0	Pocari Sweat Lady Warriors	25–22	25–19	25–22	–	–	75–63	P–2
Aug 16	18:30	Pocari Sweat Lady Warriors	1–3	BaliPure Purest Water Defenders	20–25	25–19	23–25	24–26	–	92–95	P–2

Open Conference Women's Division Champions
BaliPure Purest Water Defenders
Jasmine Nabor (c), Grethcel Soltones, Abigail Noval, Lizlee Ann Gata-Pantone, Maria Angelica Cayuna,
Aiko Sweet Urdas, Macy Mendiola, Risa Sato, Iris Oliveros, Jorelle Singh, Jerrili Malabanan, Alyssa Eroa
Head coach: Roger Gorayeb

Philips Gold–PVL Press Corps Player of the Week
Week	Player	Reference
July 8–15, 2017	Alyssa Valdez (Creamline)	
July 19–23, 2017	Kathy Bersola (Perlas)	
July 26–30, 2017	Jerrili Malabanan (BaliPure)	
August 2–6, 2017	Myla Pablo (Pocari)	

== Awards ==
Award		Recipient
MVP	Finals: Conference:	Grethcel Soltones (BaliPure); Myla Pablo (Pocari)
Best Setter		Jia Morado (Creamline)
Best Outside Spiker	1st: 2nd:	Myla Pablo (Pocari); Grethcel Soltones (BaliPure)
Best Middle Blocker	1st: 2nd:	Jeanette Panaga (Pocari); Risa Sato (BaliPure)
Best Opposite Spiker		Iari Yongco (Air Force)
Best Libero		Melissa Gohing (Pocari)

== Final standings ==
Rank	Team
1st place, gold medalist(s)	BaliPure Purest Water Defenders
2nd place, silver medalist(s)	Pocari Sweat Lady Warriors
3rd place, bronze medalist(s)	Creamline Cool Smashers
4	Philippine Air Force Jet Spikers
5	BanKo Perlas Spikers
6	UP Lady Maroons
7	Power Smashers
8	Adamson Lady Falcons
