= 2025–26 Akari Chargers season =

Fourth season of the Akari Chargers

The 2025–26 Akari Chargers season is the fourth season of the Akari Chargers in the Premier Volleyball League (PVL). This season saw the departure of Takayuki Minowa who stepped down from his position as head coach on May 31, 2025. Tina Salak was named as his successor on June 2.

The team was drawn to Pool B for the preseason PVL on Tour. With a 2–3 record and six points, the team finished fifth in Pool B, putting them in the knockout round. Akari won against Petro Gazz in straight sets to advance to the quarterfinals, where they were swept by the Cignal HD Spikers.

For the Reinforced Conference, the team acquired Annie Michem to be their foreign reinforcement for the conference.

== Roster ==
Akari Chargers roster
No.	Nat.	Player	Pos.	Height	DOB	From
1	(Philippines)	Dani Ravena	Libero	1.65 m (5 ft 5 in)	December 6, 1999 (age 26)	Ateneo
2	(Philippines)	Fifi Sharma	Middle Blocker	1.78 m (5 ft 10 in)	April 27, 2001 (age 25)	De La Salle
3	(Philippines)	Max Juangco	Libero	1.67 m (5 ft 6 in)	July 14, 2001 (age 25)	Far Eastern
4	(Philippines)	Stephanie Bustrillo	Opposite Hitter	1.73 m (5 ft 8 in)	January 7, 2001 (age 25)	Philippines
5	(Philippines)	Grethcel Soltones	Outside Hitter	1.73 m (5 ft 8 in)	September 9, 1995 (age 30)	San Sebastian
6	(Philippines)	Chenie Tagaod	Outside Hitter		January 22, 2002 (age 24)	Far Eastern
7	(Philippines)	Kamille Cal	Setter	1.70 m (5 ft 7 in)	April 25, 2001 (age 25)	National-U
8	(Philippines)	Baby Jyne Soreño	Opposite Hitter		July 9, 2000 (age 26)	De La Salle
9	(Philippines)	Theo Bea Bonafe	Setter	1.73 m (5 ft 8 in)	December 31, 2001 (age 24)	Philippines
10	(Philippines)	Judith Abil	Libero	1.70 m (5 ft 7 in)	December 4, 1997 (age 28)	UE
11	(Philippines)	Faith Nisperos	Outside Hitter	1.76 m (5 ft 9 in)	January 2, 2000 (age 26)	Ateneo
12	(Philippines)	Joan Doguna	Outside Hitter		July 5, 2000 (age 26)	Lyceum
13	(Philippines)	Celine Domingo	Middle Blocker	1.75 m (5 ft 9 in)	April 20, 1999 (age 27)	Far Eastern
14	(Philippines)	Jamaica Villena	Middle Blocker		January 30, 2001 (age 25)	Emilio Aguinaldo
15	(Philippines)	Justine Jazareno (C)	Libero	1.65 m (5 ft 5 in)	March 25, 2000 (age 26)	De La Salle
16	(Philippines)	Ivy Lacsina	Outside Hitter	1.85 m (6 ft 1 in)	October 21, 1999 (age 26)	National-U
17	(Philippines)	Mary Rhose Dapol	Outside Hitter	1.70 m (5 ft 7 in)	December 1, 2000 (age 25)	UPHSD
18	(Philippines)	Cza Carandang	Middle Blocker	1.80 m (5 ft 11 in)	October 11, 1995 (age 30)	Far Eastern
19	(Philippines)	Mars Alba	Setter	1.68 m (5 ft 6 in)	August 26, 1999 (age 26)	De La Salle
24	(Philippines)	Eli Soyud	Opposite Hitter	1.74 m (5 ft 9 in)	December 27, 1995 (age 30)	Adamson

Coaching staff

- Head coach:
  Tina Salak
- Assistant coaches:
  Eddieson Orcullo
  Vince Mangulabnan
  Jeremiah Barrica
  Juvie Mangaring
  Jade Nadera
  Brian Esquibel
- Strength & conditioning coach:
  Jem Manalang

Team staff

- Team manager:
  Mozzy Ravena
- Assistant team manager:
  Michelle Cobb
- Utility:
  Jaecee Obena

Medical staff

- Physical therapists:
  Jules Parco & Joriki Suva
- Physiotherapist:
  Juliene Cuyugan
- Nutritionist:
  Dr. Jo-Ann Tan Lorenzo

=== National team players ===
Players who are part of the Philippines women's national team are excluded from playing with the team due to various commitments. This affected the team's roster for the PVL on Tour.

- Justine Jazareno
- Fifi Sharma

== Draft ==
Round	Pick	Player	Pos.	School
1	10	Chenie Tagaod	OH/OP	FEU
2	22	Jamaica Villena	MB	EAC
3	27	Joan Doguna	OH	Lyceum

== PVL on Tour ==
=== Preliminary round ===
==== Pool B standings ====
Pos	Team	Pld	W	L	Pts	SW	SL	SR	SPW	SPL	SPR	Qualification
2	Creamline Cool Smashers	5	3	2	10	11	8	1.375	441	394	1.119	Final round
3	Chery Tiggo Crossovers	5	3	2	9	12	10	1.200	488	451	1.082	Knockout round
4	Zus Coffee Thunderbelles	5	3	2	7	12	12	1.000	512	503	1.018	Knockout round
5	Akari Chargers	5	2	3	6	9	11	0.818	420	460	0.913	Knockout round
6	Capital1 Solar Spikers	5	0	5	1	3	15	0.200	353	432	0.817	Knockout round

Source: PVL.ph

==== Match log ====
2025 PVL on Tour preliminary round match log
Total: 2–3 (6 points)
June: 0–2 (0 points)

Match	Date	Opponent	Sets	Total	Location Attendance	Record	Pts	Report
1	June 22, 2025	Cignal	0–3	60–75	Chavit Coliseum; 5,264	0–1	0	P2
2	June 23, 2025	Creamline	1–3	87–99	Chavit Coliseum; 4,996	0–2	0	P2

July: 2–1 (6 points)

Match	Date	Opponent	Sets	Total	Location Attendance	Record	Pts	Report
3	July 5, 2025	Zus Coffee	3–2	102–110	Ynares Center Montalban; 1,393	1–2	2	P2
4	July 6, 2025	Chery Tiggo	2–3	96–112	Ynares Center Montalban; 1,076	1–3	3	P2
5	July 15, 2025	Capital1	3–0	75–64	Filoil Centre; 953	2–3	6	P2

=== Knockout round ===
==== Match log ====
2025 PVL on Tour knockout round match log
Total: 1–0 (3 points)
Knockout round: 1–0 (3 points)

Date	Opponent	Sets	Total	Location Attendance	Report
August 5, 2025	Petro Gazz	3–0	82–71	PhilSports Arena; 706	P2

=== Final round ===
==== Bracket ====
Quarterfinals
August 7
1 PLDT	3
8 Zus Coffee	0
August 9
4 Creamline	3
5 Farm Fresh	0
August 7
2 Cignal	3
7 Akari	0
August 9
3 Nxled	0
6 Chery Tiggo	3

Semifinals
August 12
PLDT	3
Creamline	2
August 12
Cignal	1
Chery Tiggo	3

Championship
August 17
PLDT	3
Chery Tiggo	2
3rd place match
August 17
Creamline	3
Cignal	0

==== Match log ====
2025 PVL on Tour final round match log
Total: 0–1 (0 points)
Quarterfinals: 0–1 (0 points)

Date	Opponent	Sets	Total	Location Attendance	Report
August 7, 2025	Cignal	0–3	57–78	PhilSports Arena; 564	P2

== Reinforced Conference ==
=== Preliminary round ===
==== Standings ====
Pos	Team	Pld	W	L	Pts	SW	SL	SR	SPW	SPL	SPR	Qualification
6	Cignal Super Spikers	8	5	3	13	16	14	1.143	672	650	1.034	Quarterfinals
7	Capital1 Solar Spikers	8	4	4	13	16	14	1.143	660	688	0.959	Quarterfinals
8	Akari Chargers	8	4	4	12	18	16	1.125	749	731	1.025	Quarterfinals
9	Choco Mucho Flying Titans	8	3	5	9	11	17	0.647	621	660	0.941	
10	Chery Tiggo EV Crossovers	8	2	6	6	12	20	0.600	673	724	0.930	

Source: Premier Volleyball League

==== Match log ====
2025 PVL Reinforced Conference preliminary round match log
Total: 4–4 (12 points)
First round: 3–2 (9 points)

Match	Date	Opponent	Sets	Total	Location Attendance	Record	Pts	Report
1 (Note: The result of Akari's game against Zus Coffee in the PVL Reinforced Conference preliminary round was nullified as the game would be replayed with foreign guest players on November 4.)	October 7, 2025	Zus Coffee	2–3	105–107	Ynares Center Montalban; 1,533	—	—	P2
2	October 11, 2025	Creamline	3–2	116–113	City of Dasmariñas Arena; 4,183	1–0	2	P2
3	October 14, 2025	Chery Tiggo	3–2	108–95	Smart Araneta Coliseum; 1,286	2–0	4	P2
4	October 23, 2025	Petro Gazz	2–3	110–105	Filoil Centre; 1,241	2–1	5	P2
5	October 28, 2025	Galeries Tower	3–0	75–57	Filoil Centre; 580	3–1	8	P2
6	November 4, 2025	Zus Coffee	2–3	92–110	SM Mall of Asia Arena; 1,178	3–2	9	P2

Second round: 1–2 (3 points)

Match	Date	Opponent	Sets	Total	Location Attendance	Record	Pts	Report
7	November 6, 2025	Cignal	1–3	86–98	Filoil Centre; 518	3–3	9	P2
8	November 13, 2025	Nxled	3–0	75–52	Smart Araneta Coliseum; 2,074	4–3	12	P2
9	November 18, 2025	Choco Mucho	1–3	92–96	Ynares Center Montalban; 2,226	4–4	12	P2

=== Final round ===
==== Bracket ====
Quarterfinals
November 24
Farm Fresh	0
Akari	3
November 24
Creamline	1
Petro Gazz	3
November 24
Zus Coffee	3
Capital1	0
November 24
PLDT	3
Cignal	1

Semifinals
November 27
Akari	2
Petro Gazz	3
November 27
Zus Coffee	3
PLDT	0

Championship
November 30
Petro Gazz	3
Zus Coffee	1
3rd-place match
November 30
Akari	3
PLDT	2

==== Match log ====
2025 PVL Reinforced Conference final round match log
Total: 2–1 (3 points)
Quarterfinals: 1–0 (3 points)

Date	Opponent	Sets	Total	Location Attendance	Report
November 24, 2025	Farm Fresh	3–0	83–75	Smart Araneta Coliseum	P2

Semifinals: 0–1 (6 points)

Date	Opponent	Sets	Total	Location Attendance	Report
November 27, 2025	Petro Gazz	2–3	99–102	Smart Araneta Coliseum	P2

Third-place match: 1–0 (2 point)

Date	Opponent	Sets	Total	Location Attendance	Report
November 30, 2025	PLDT	3–2	107–115	Smart Araneta Coliseum; 1,998	P2

== All-Filipino Conference ==
=== Preliminary round ===
==== Standings ====
Pos	Team	Pld	W	L	Pts	SW	SL	SR	SPW	SPL	SPR	Qualification
4	Farm Fresh Foxies	9	5	4	17	22	16	1.375	850	771	1.102	Qualifying round
5	Nxled Chameleons	9	5	4	15	20	16	1.250	810	773	1.048	Play-in tournament semifinals
6	Akari Chargers	9	5	4	15	19	18	1.056	792	838	0.945	Play-in tournament semifinals
7	Choco Mucho Flying Titans	9	4	5	13	19	19	1.000	828	826	1.002	Play-in tournament quarterfinals
8	Capital1 Solar Spikers	9	4	5	10	14	21	0.667	748	796	0.940	Play-in tournament quarterfinals

Source: Premier Volleyball League

==== Match log ====
2026 PVL All-Filipino Conference preliminary round match log
Total: 5–4 (15 points)
January: 0–1 (0 points)

Match	Date	Opponent	Sets	Total	Location Attendance	Record	Pts	Report
1	January 31, 2026	Choco Mucho	0–3	60–75	Filoil Centre; 2,754	0–1	0	P2

February: 2–2 (6 points)

Match	Date	Opponent	Sets	Total	Location Attendance	Record	Pts	Report
2	February 12, 2026	Zus Coffee	2–3	103–99	Filoil Centre; 740	0–1	1	P2
3	February 19, 2026	PLDT	1–3	85–100	Filoil Centre; 386	0–2	1	P2
4	February 24, 2026	Nxled	3–1	98–88	Filoil Centre; 550	1–2	4	P2
5	February 28, 2026	Cignal	3–2	96–108	Filoil Centre; 696	2–2	6	P2

March: 3–1 (9 points)

Match	Date	Opponent	Sets	Total	Location Attendance	Record	Pts	Report
6	March 7, 2026	Capital1	3–1	92–84	Filoil Centre; 3,289	1–0	9	P2
7	March 12, 2026	Creamline	3–1	93–91	Filoil Centre; 1,384	2–0	12	P2
8	March 17, 2026	Galeries Tower	3–1	90–95	Filoil Centre; 2,008	3–0	15	P2
9	March 21, 2026	Farm Fresh	1–3	75–98	Filoil Centre; 2,845	3–1	15	P2

=== Play-in tournament ===
==== Pool B ====
Play-in pool B quarterfinal
7	Choco Mucho	3
10	Zus Coffee	2

Play-in pool B semifinal
6	Akari	3
7	Choco Mucho	2

Play-in pool B final
3	Creamline	3
6	Akari	1

==== Match log ====
2026 PVL All-Filipino Conference play-in tournament match log
Total: 1–1 (2 points)
Play-in tournament: 1–1 (2 points)

Match	Date	Opponent	Sets	Total	Location Attendance	Record	Pts	Report
1	March 28, 2026	Choco Mucho	3–2	109–100	Ninoy Aquino Stadium; 2,388	1–0	2	P2
2	April 7, 2026	Creamline	1–3	84–91	Filoil Centre; 3,864	1–1	2	P2

== Transactions ==
=== Additions ===
Player	Date signed	Previous team	Ref.
Chenie Tagaod	June 15, 2025	FEU Lady Tamaraws (UAAP)	
Jamaica Villena	June 15, 2025	EAC Lady Generals (NCAA)	
Joan Doguna	June 15, 2025	Lyceum Lady Pirates (NCAA)	
Theo Bea Bonafe	June 21, 2025	Creamline Cool Smashers	
Marionne Alba	July 9, 2025	Choco Mucho Flying Titans	
Judith Abil	January 10, 2026	Cignal Super Spikers	
Cza Carandang	January 10, 2026	Chery Tiggo EV Crossovers	
Jyne Soreño	January 10, 2026	Chery Tiggo EV Crossovers	
Mary Rhose Dapol	January 24, 2026	Chery Tiggo EV Crossovers	

=== Subtractions ===
Player	New team	Ref.
Ezra Madrigal	Capital1 Solar Spikers	
Erika Raagas	Galeries Tower Highrisers	
Camille Victoria	Galeries Tower Highrisers	

=== Foreign guest player ===
Team	Foreign player	Moving from	Ref.
Akari Chargers	(United States) Annie Michem	(Indonesia) Jakarta Livin' Mandiri	

=== Coaching changes ===
Team	Outgoing coach	Manner of departure	Replaced by	Ref
Akari Chargers	(Japan) Takayuki Minowa	Replaced	(Philippines) Tina Salak	
