= 2026–27 Akari Chargers season =

Filipino women's volleyball team season

The 2026–27 Akari Chargers season will be the fifth season of the Akari Chargers in the Premier Volleyball League (PVL).

In the PVL on Tour. Akari Chargers opens their PVL on Tour Showdown on July 8, 2026 with a four-set loss to Zus Coffee Thunderbelles in Ilagan, Isabela. In their second game on August 1, 2026, the Chargers notched their first win, over the Choco Mucho Flying Titans in Polomolok, South Cotabato. Akari ended their three-game campaign with a 1–2 record on August 15, 2026, with another four-set loss to PLDT High Speed Hitters in Tubod, Lanao del Norte.

== Roster ==
Akari Chargers roster
No.	Nat.	Player	Pos.	Height	DOB	From
1	(Philippines)	Mary Rhose Dapol	Outside Hitter	1.70 m (5 ft 7 in)	December 1, 2000 (age 25)	UPHSD
2	(Philippines)	Fifi Sharma	Middle Blocker	1.78 m (5 ft 10 in)	April 27, 2001 (age 25)	De La Salle
3	(Philippines)	Chenie Tagaod	Outside Hitter	1.79 m (5 ft 10 in)	January 22, 2002 (age 24)	Far Eastern
4	(Philippines)	Justine Jazareno (C)	Libero	1.65 m (5 ft 5 in)	March 25, 2000 (age 26)	De La Salle
5	(Philippines)	Grethcel Soltones	Outside Hitter	1.73 m (5 ft 8 in)	September 9, 1995 (age 31)	San Sebastian
6	(Philippines) (Japan)	Risa Sato	Middle Blocker	1.76 m (5 ft 9 in)	October 4, 1994 (age 32)	National-U
8	(Philippines)	Jyne Soreño	Opposite Hitter	1.750 m (5 ft 9 in)	July 9, 2000 (age 26)	De La Salle
10	(Philippines)	Judith Abil	Libero	1.70 m (5 ft 7 in)	December 4, 1997 (age 28)	UE
11	(Philippines)	Faith Nisperos	Outside Hitter	1.76 m (5 ft 9 in)	January 2, 2000 (age 26)	Ateneo
12	(Philippines)	Eli Soyud	Opposite Hitter	1.74 m (5 ft 9 in)	December 27, 1995 (age 30)	Adamson
13	(Philippines)	Celine Domingo	Middle Blocker	1.75 m (5 ft 9 in)	April 20, 1999 (age 27)	Far Eastern
15	(Philippines)	Tin Tiamzon	Outside Hitter	1.76 m (5 ft 9 in)	May 4, 1997 (age 29)	De La Salle
16	(Philippines)	Ivy Lacsina	Outside Hitter	1.85 m (6 ft 1 in)	October 21, 1999 (age 27)	National-U
17	(Philippines)	Xyza Gula	Outside Hitter	1.62 m (5 ft 4 in)	August 30, 2003 (age 23)	UST
18	(Philippines)	Joyme Cagande	Setter	1.63 m (5 ft 4 in)	February 18, 1999 (age 27)	National-U
19	(Philippines)	Mars Alba	Setter	1.68 m (5 ft 6 in)	August 26, 1999 (age 27)	De La Salle
20	(Philippines)	Ann Monares	Libero	1.78 m (5 ft 10 in)	August 22, 2002 (age 24)	Far Eastern
25	(Philippines)	Sharya Ancheta	Middle Blocker	1.77 m (5 ft 10 in)	November 25, 1999 (age 26)	Adamson
Updated as of: October 8, 2026 | Source: PVL.ph

Coaching staff

- Head coach:
  Tina Salak
- Assistant coaches:
  Eddieson Orcullo
  Vince Mangulabnan
  Jeremiah Barrica
  Juvie Mangaring
  Jade Nadera
  Sid Gerella
- Strength & conditioning coach:
  Jem Manalang

Team staff

- Team manager:
  Nicole Tiamzon
- Utility:
  Jaecee Obena

Medical staff

- Physical therapists:
  Jules Parco & Joriki Suva
- Physiotherapist:
  Juliene Cuyugan
- Nutritionist:
  Dr. Jo-Ann Tan Lorenzo

== Draft ==
The Akari Chargers holding the fifth overall selection of the 2026 PVL Rookie Draft, elected to pass during the first round, thus eventually came away without a single rookie.

== PVL on Tour ==
=== Results summary ===
Team	Game		
Team	1	2	3
Akari (AKA)	ZUS; 1–3	CMF; 3–1	HSH; 1–3

Source: Premier Volleyball League
Legend: Blue = win; Red = loss

== All-Filipino Conference ==
=== Preliminary round ===
==== Standings ====
Pos	Team	Pld	W	L	Pts	SW	SL	SR	SPW	SPL	SPR	Qualification
4	PLDT High Speed Hitters	7	4	3	13	14	12	1.167	584	573	1.019	Twice-to-win in semifinals
5	Choco Mucho Flying Titans	7	4	3	12	17	14	1.214	690	643	1.073	
6	Akari Chargers	8	3	5	9	14	19	0.737	724	745	0.972	
7	Zus Coffee Thunderbelles	7	2	5	7	11	18	0.611	591	639	0.925	
8	Capital1 Solar Spikers	7	2	5	5	10	19	0.526	608	660	0.921	

Updated to match(es) played on November 17, 2026. Source: Premier Volleyball League

==== Match log ====
2026–27 PVL All-Filipino Conference Siklab series preliminary round match log
Total: 3–5 (9 points)
October: 2–2 (6 points)

Match	Date	Opponent	Sets	Total	Location Attendance	Record	Pts	Report
1	October 10, 2026	Creamline	0–3	57–75	SM Seaside Cebu Arena; 19,106	0–1	0	P2
2	October 15, 2026	Capital1	2–3	110–119	Ynares Center Antipolo; 740	0–2	1	P2
3	October 20, 2026	PLDT	3–0	75–59	SM Mall of Asia Arena; 647	1–2	4	P2
4	October 27, 2026	Farm Fresh	3–2	112–109	Ninoy Aquino Stadium; 268	2–2	6	P2

November: 1–3 (3 points)

Match	Date	Opponent	Sets	Total	Location Attendance	Record	Pts	Report
5	November 3, 2026	Galeries Tower	2–3	106–104	Smart Araneta Coliseum; 426	2–3	7	P2
6	November 7, 2026	Choco Mucho	3–2	107–104	PhilSports Arena; 2,240	3–3	9	P2
7	November 12, 2026	Nxled	0–3	71–78	Smart Araneta Coliseum; 2,053	3–4	9	P2
8	November 17, 2026	Zus Coffee	1–3	86–97	PhilSports Arena; 843	3–5	9	P2

== Transactions ==
=== Additions ===
Player	Date signed	Previous team	Ref.
Tin Tiamzon	May 24, 2026	Cignal Super Spikers	
Ann Monares	June 16, 2026	Farm Fresh Foxies	
Sharya Ancheta	June 16, 2026	Galeries Tower Highrisers	
Risa Sato	July 2, 2026	Chery Tiggo EV Crossovers	
Joyme Cagande	August 1, 2026	Nxled Chameleons	
Xyza Gula	September 16, 2026	UST Golden Tigresses (UAAP)	

=== Subtractions ===
Player	New team	Ref.
Max Juangco	Free agent	
Dani Ravena	Free agent	
Bea Bonafe	Farm Fresh Foxies	
Stephanie Bustrillo	Free agent	
Joan Doguna	Free agent	
Kamille Cal	Farm Fresh Foxies	
