= 2024–25 Akari Chargers season =

Third season of the Akari Chargers

The 2024–25 Akari Chargers season was the third season of the Akari Chargers in the Premier Volleyball League (PVL). This was Akari's first season without Philippines women's national team head coach Jorge Edson, who resigned on December 14, 2023, after coaching the team since it joined the PVL in 2022. Akari then named Raffy Mosuela as his successor on January 23, 2024. On the players' side, the Chargers brought in former Finals MVPs Grethcel Soltones and Celine Domingo from the Petro Gazz Angels and Creamline Cool Smashers, respectively. They were joined by new recruit Max Juangco from the FEU Lady Tamaraws.

In the 2024 All-Filipino Conference, the Chargers went to a slow start going 0–2 in their first two matches before claiming their first win against the Farm Fresh Foxies on the third match. The team went back-and-forth throughout the conference and ended up with a 5–6 record with 15 points. The team finished seventh in the final standings.

Going into the Reinforced Conference, the team went through a reshuffling. On May 20, Akari swapped some of its players with sister team Nxled Chameleons, resulting in Kamille Cal, Ivy Lacsina, Dani Ravena, and Camille Victoria joining the team and Trisha Genesis, Jaja Maraguinot, and Bang Pineda transferring for Nxled. The swap also included coach Mosuela, with Takayuki Minowa succeeding him in the head coaching role. It also recruited undrafted players Catherine Almazan and Ysabela Bakabak from EAC and De La Salle, respectively. They then brought in Oluoma Okaro to serve as the team's import for the conference. In the midst of all these moves, Roselle Baliton and Dindin Santiago-Manabat both departed the team.

The team's reshuffling paid off in the preliminary round, finishing with an 8–0 sweep with 21 points. In the quarterfinals, the Chargers beat Farm Fresh to advance to the semifinals for the first time in team history. They then faced the PLDT High Speed Hitters in the semifinals, who they beat 3–2 to clinch their first-ever championship berth, but not without controversy. In the championship, the team was challenged by Creamline, where the team suffered a sweep.

The Chargers qualified for the Invitational Conference as a result of the team reaching the semifinals, but decided to opt out due to injury concerns.

In the 2024–25 All-Filipino Conference, Akari finished 7th in the preliminary round with a 5–6 record and 15 points. In the qualifying round, they won against the Farm Fresh Foxies in a five-set match to advance to the final round. In the quarterfinals, the Chargers swept the Galeries Tower Highrisers despite both matches going the full length to advance to the round-robin semifinals. After a three-set loss to the Petro Gazz Angels in their final semifinal match, Akari was eliminated from championship contention, and were eventually matched against the Choco Mucho Flying Titans in the third-place series. The team beat Choco Mucho in three matches to finish the conference with a bronze medal and back-to-back podium finishes.

== Roster ==
Akari Chargers
| No. | Player | Position | Height | Birth date | Alma mater |
|---|---|---|---|---|---|
| 1 | (Philippines) Dani Ravena | Libero | 1.65 m (5 ft 5 in) | December 6, 1999 (age 26) | ADMU |
| 2 | (Philippines) Fifi Sharma | Middle Blocker | 1.78 m (5 ft 10 in) | April 27, 2001 (age 25) | DLSU |
| 3 | (Philippines) Max Juangco | Libero | 1.67 m (5 ft 6 in) | July 14, 2001 (age 24) | FEU |
| 4 | (Philippines) Stephanie Bustrillo | Opposite Hitter | 1.73 m (5 ft 8 in) | January 7, 2001 (age 25) | UP |
| 5 | (Philippines) Grethcel Soltones | Outside hitter | 1.73 m (5 ft 8 in) | September 9, 1995 (age 30) | SSC-R |
| 6 | (Philippines) Michelle Cobb (C) | Setter | 1.61 m (5 ft 3 in) | February 16, 1999 (age 27) | DLSU |
| 7 | (Philippines) Kamille Cal | Setter | 1.70 m (5 ft 7 in) | April 25, 2001 (age 25) | NU |
| 8 | (Philippines) Ezra Madrigal | Middle blocker | 1.81 m (5 ft 11 in) | December 8, 1999 (age 26) | FEU |
| 9 | (Philippines) Janine Marciano | Outside hitter | 1.65 m (5 ft 5 in) | January 9, 1992 (age 34) | San Beda |
| 10 | (Philippines) Camille Victoria | Middle Blocker | 1.82 m (6 ft 0 in) | December 26, 1999 (age 26) | UST |
| 11 | (Philippines) Erika Raagas | Opposite hitter | 1.68 m (5 ft 6 in) | March 30, 2000 (age 26) | ADMU |
| 12 | (Philippines) Ysabela Bakabak | Middle Blocker | 1.78 m (5 ft 10 in) | December 1, 2002 (age 23) | DLSU |
| 13 | (Philippines) Celine Domingo | Middle Blocker | 1.75 m (5 ft 9 in) | April 20, 1999 (age 27) | FEU |
| 14 | (Philippines) Cathrine Almazan | Outside Hitter | 1.66 m (5 ft 5 in) | October 17, 1999 (age 26) | EAC |
| 15 | (Philippines) Ylizyeth Justine Jazareno | Libero | 1.65 m (5 ft 5 in) | March 25, 2000 (age 26) | DLSU |
| 16 | (Philippines) Ivy Lacsina | Outside Hitter | 1.85 m (6 ft 1 in) | October 21, 1999 (age 26) | NU |
| 17 | (Philippines) Faith Nisperos | Outside hitter | 1.76 m (5 ft 9 in) | January 2, 2000 (age 26) | ADMU |
| 24 | (Philippines) Eli Soyud | Opposite hitter | 1.74 m (5 ft 9 in) | December 27, 1995 (age 30) | AdU |

Coaching staff

- Head coach:
  Takayuki Minowa
- Assistant coaches:
  Maria Vilet Ponce De Leon
  Vince Mangulabnan
  Rodel Canino
  Juvie Mangaring
  Sid Gerella
  Hayashi Yuga

Team staff

- Team manager:
  Mozzy Ravena
- Utility:
  Jaecee Obena

Medical staff

- Strength & conditioning coach:
  Jem Manalang
- Physical therapist:
  Krish Torres
- Physiotherapist:
  Trina Corbitt

== 2024 All-Filipino Conference ==
=== Preliminary round ===
==== Standings ====
| Pos | Team | Pld | W | L | Pts | SW | SL | SR | SPW | SPL | SPR |
|---|---|---|---|---|---|---|---|---|---|---|---|
| 5 | PLDT High Speed Hitters | 11 | 8 | 3 | 23 | 25 | 12 | 2.083 | 859 | 726 | 1.183 |
| 6 | Cignal HD Spikers | 11 | 7 | 4 | 22 | 23 | 14 | 1.643 | 869 | 747 | 1.163 |
| 7 | Akari Chargers | 11 | 5 | 6 | 15 | 17 | 18 | 0.944 | 767 | 750 | 1.023 |
| 8 | Nxled Chameleons | 11 | 4 | 7 | 11 | 14 | 23 | 0.609 | 794 | 824 | 0.964 |
| 9 | Farm Fresh Foxies | 11 | 3 | 8 | 11 | 14 | 24 | 0.583 | 785 | 863 | 0.910 |

Source: TeamPilipinas.info

==== Match log ====
2024 PVL All-Filipino Conference preliminary round match log
Total: 5–6 (15 points)
February: 0–2 (0 points)

| Match | Date | Opponent | Sets | Total | Location Attendance | Record | Pts | Report |
|---|---|---|---|---|---|---|---|---|
| 1 | February 24, 2024 | Cignal | 1–3 | 73–96 | Smart Araneta Coliseum; 2,734 | 0–1 | 0 | P2 |
| 2 | February 29, 2024 | Creamline | 1–3 | 88–96 | PhilSports Arena; 2,544 | 0–2 | 0 | P2 |

March: 2–2 (6 points)

| Match | Date | Opponent | Sets | Total | Location Attendance | Record | Pts | Report |
|---|---|---|---|---|---|---|---|---|
| 3 | March 5, 2024 | Farm Fresh | 3–0 | 75–56 | PhilSports Arena; 329 | 1–2 | 3 | P2 |
| 4 | March 9, 2024 | Petro Gazz | 0–3 | 61–75 | Filoil EcoOil Centre; 1,053 | 1–3 | 3 | P2 |
| 5 | March 16, 2024 | Nxled | 3–0 | 75–56 | Santa Rosa Sports Complex; 5,178 | 2–3 | 6 | P2 |
| 6 | March 23, 2024 | Choco Mucho | 0–3 | 60–75 | Ynares Center; 3,576 | 2–4 | 6 | P2 |

April: 3–2 (9 points)

| Match | Date | Opponent | Sets | Total | Location Attendance | Record | Pts | Report |
|---|---|---|---|---|---|---|---|---|
| 7 | April 2, 2024 | PLDT | 0–3 | 56–75 | PhilSports Arena; 863 | 2–5 | 6 | P2 |
| 8 | April 6, 2024 | Galeries Tower | 3–0 | 75–56 | Santa Rosa Sports Complex; 4,316 | 3–5 | 9 | P2 |
| 9 | April 11, 2024 | Capital1 | 3–0 | 75–51 | PhilSports Arena; 621 | 4–5 | 12 | P2 |
| 10 | April 20, 2024 | Chery Tiggo | 0–3 | 54–75 | Santa Rosa Sports Complex; 2,933 | 4–6 | 12 | P2 |
| 11 | April 27, 2024 | Strong Group | 3–0 | 75–39 | PhilSports Arena; 396 | 5–6 | 15 | P2 |

== Draft ==
| Round | Pick | Player | Position | School |
| 1 | 6 | Stephanie Bustrillo | OP | UP |

The Akari Chargers selected Stephanie Bustrillo with the 6th pick before passing during the second round.

== Reinforced Conference ==
=== Preliminary round ===
==== Standings ====
| Pos | Team | Pld | W | L | Pts | SW | SL | SR | SPW | SPL | SPR | Qualification |
|---|---|---|---|---|---|---|---|---|---|---|---|---|
| 1 | Akari Chargers | 8 | 8 | 0 | 21 | 24 | 9 | 2.667 | 686 | 618 | 1.110 | Quarterfinals |
| 2 | Cignal HD Spikers | 8 | 7 | 1 | 20 | 22 | 8 | 2.750 | 648 | 562 | 1.153 | Quarterfinals |
| 3 | Creamline Cool Smashers | 8 | 6 | 2 | 20 | 22 | 9 | 2.444 | 744 | 653 | 1.139 | Quarterfinals |
| 4 | PLDT High Speed Hitters | 8 | 6 | 2 | 19 | 22 | 9 | 2.444 | 713 | 622 | 1.146 | Quarterfinals |
| 5 | Chery Tiggo Crossovers | 8 | 5 | 3 | 15 | 18 | 12 | 1.500 | 649 | 635 | 1.022 | Quarterfinals |

Source: Premier Volleyball League

==== Match log ====
2024 PVL Reinforced Conference preliminary round match log
Total: 8–0 (21 points)
July: 3–0 (7 points)

| Match | Date | Opponent | Sets | Total | Location Attendance | Record | Pts | Report |
|---|---|---|---|---|---|---|---|---|
| 1 | July 18, 2024 | Capital1 | 3–1 | 99–82 | PhilSports Arena; 1,676 | 1–0 | 3 | P2 |
| 2 | July 23, 2024 | Choco Mucho | 3–2 | 99–107 | PhilSports Arena; 1,212 | 2–0 | 5 | P2 |
| 3 | July 27, 2024 | Petro Gazz | 3–2 | 114–114 | PhilSports Arena; 1,713 | 3–0 | 7 | P2 |

August: 5–0 (14 points)

| Match | Date | Opponent | Sets | Total | Location Attendance | Record | Pts | Report |
|---|---|---|---|---|---|---|---|---|
| 4 | August 1, 2024 | Zus Coffee | 3–0 | 75–56 | PhilSports Arena; 1,138 | 4–0 | 10 | P2 |
| 5 | August 6, 2024 | Cignal | 3–1 | 90–83 | PhilSports Arena; 562 | 5–0 | 13 | P2 |
| 6 | August 10, 2024 | Galeries Tower | 3–2 | 113–97 | PhilSports Arena; 366 | 6–0 | 15 | P2 |
| 7 | August 15, 2024 | Nxled | 3–1 | 96–79 | PhilSports Arena; 410 | 7–0 | 18 | P2 |
| 8 | August 20, 2024 | Farm Fresh | 3–0 | 75–60 | Filoil EcoOil Centre; 310 | 8–0 | 21 | P2 |

=== Final round ===
==== Bracket ====
Quarterfinals
August 24
1 Akari | 3
8 Farm Fresh | 1
August 27
4 PLDT | 3
5 Chery Tiggo | 2
August 24
2 Cignal | 3
7 Capital1 | 2
August 27
3 Creamline | 3
6 Petro Gazz | 0

Semifinals
August 31
Akari | 3
PLDT | 2
August 31
Cignal | 2
Creamline | 3

Championship
September 4
Akari | 0
Creamline | 3
3rd place match
September 4
PLDT | 1
Cignal | 3

==== Match log ====
2024 PVL Reinforced Conference final round match log
Total: 2–1 (5 points)
Quarterfinals: 1–0 (3 points)

| Date | Opponent | Sets | Total | Location Attendance | Report |
|---|---|---|---|---|---|
| August 24, 2024 | Farm Fresh | 3–1 | 92–88 | Filoil EcoOil Centre; 1,301 | P2 |

Semifinals: 1–0 (2 points)

| Date | Opponent | Sets | Total | Location Attendance | Report |
|---|---|---|---|---|---|
| August 31, 2024 | PLDT | 3–2 | 108–111 | SM Mall of Asia Arena; 7,496 | P2 |

Championship match: 0–1 (0 points)

| Date | Opponent | Sets | Total | Location Attendance | Report |
|---|---|---|---|---|---|
| September 4, 2024 | Creamline | 0–3 | 55–75 | PhilSports Arena; 8,289 | P2 |

== 2024–25 All-Filipino Conference ==
=== Preliminary round ===
==== Standings ====
| Pos | Team | Pld | W | L | Pts | SW | SL | SR | SPW | SPL | SPR | Qualification |
|---|---|---|---|---|---|---|---|---|---|---|---|---|
| 5 | Choco Mucho Flying Titans | 11 | 8 | 3 | 20 | 27 | 20 | 1.350 | 1064 | 1031 | 1.032 | Qualifying round |
| 6 | Farm Fresh Foxies | 11 | 5 | 6 | 15 | 18 | 22 | 0.818 | 847 | 915 | 0.926 | Qualifying round |
| 7 | Akari Chargers | 11 | 5 | 6 | 15 | 16 | 22 | 0.727 | 844 | 868 | 0.972 | Qualifying round |
| 8 | Chery Tiggo Crossovers | 11 | 5 | 6 | 14 | 20 | 24 | 0.833 | 957 | 966 | 0.991 | Qualifying round |
| 9 | Zus Coffee Thunderbelles | 11 | 4 | 7 | 14 | 20 | 23 | 0.870 | 958 | 962 | 0.996 | Qualifying round |

Source: Premier Volleyball League

==== Match log ====
2024–25 PVL All-Filipino Conference preliminary round match log
Total: 5–6 (15 points)
November: 2–2 (6 points)

| Match | Date | Opponent | Sets | Total | Location Attendance | Record | Pts | Report |
|---|---|---|---|---|---|---|---|---|
| 1 | November 9, 2024 | Galeries Tower | 3–1 | 103–84 | PhilSports Arena; 3,049 | 1–0 | 3 | P2 |
| 2 | November 14, 2024 | Zus Coffee | 3–1 | 94–83 | Filoil EcoOil Centre; 825 | 2–0 | 6 | P2 |
| 3 | November 23, 2024 | Creamline | 0–3 | 57–76 | Candon City Arena; 6,187 | 2–1 | 6 | P2 |
| 4 | November 30, 2024 | Farm Fresh | 0–3 | 58–75 | PhilSports Arena; 751 | 2–2 | 6 | P2 |

December: 1–1 (3 points)

| Match | Date | Opponent | Sets | Total | Location Attendance | Record | Pts | Report |
|---|---|---|---|---|---|---|---|---|
| 5 | December 5, 2024 | Petro Gazz | 0–3 | 71–82 | Smart Araneta Coliseum; 560 | 2–3 | 6 | P2 |
| 6 | December 10, 2024 | Chery Tiggo | 3–1 | 98–87 | PhilSports Arena; 901 | 3–3 | 9 | P2 |

January: 1–1 (3 points)

| Match | Date | Opponent | Sets | Total | Location Attendance | Record | Pts | Report |
|---|---|---|---|---|---|---|---|---|
| 7 | January 18, 2025 | PLDT | 0–3 | 53–75 | PhilSports Arena; 2,875 | 3–4 | 9 | P2 |
| 8 | January 23, 2025 | Nxled | 3–1 | 97–87 | PhilSports Arena; 1,002 | 4–4 | 12 | P2 |

February: 1–2 (3 points)

| Match | Date | Opponent | Sets | Total | Location Attendance | Record | Pts | Report |
|---|---|---|---|---|---|---|---|---|
| 9 | February 1, 2025 | Capital1 | 3–0 | 76–50 | PhilSports Arena; 2,667 | 5–4 | 15 | P2 |
| 10 | February 8, 2025 | Choco Mucho | 1–3 | 84–94 | PhilSports Arena; 3,088 | 5–5 | 15 | P2 |
| 11 | February 18, 2025 | Cignal | 0–3 | 53–75 | PhilSports Arena; 436 | 5–6 | 15 | P2 |

=== Qualifying round ===
==== Match log ====
2024–25 PVL All-Filipino Conference qualifying round match log
Total: 1–0 (2 points)
Qualifying round: 1–0 (2 points)

| Date | Opponent | Sets | Total | Location Attendance | Report |
|---|---|---|---|---|---|
| March 4, 2025 | Farm Fresh | 3–2 | 106–91 | PhilSports Arena; 442 | P2 |

=== Final round ===
==== Bracket ====
Quarterfinals
1 | Creamline | 2
8 | Chery Tiggo | 0
2 | Petro Gazz | 2
7 | Zus Coffee | 1
3 | Galeries Tower | 0
6 | Akari | 2
4 | PLDT | 0
5 | Choco Mucho | 2

Semifinals
Creamline | 6
Petro Gazz | 9
Choco Mucho | 1
Akari | 2

Finals
Championship
Creamline | 1
Petro Gazz | 2
Third-place
Choco Mucho | 1
Akari | 2

===== Semifinals standings =====
| Pos | Team | Pld | W | L | Pts | SW | SL | SR | SPW | SPL | SPR | Qualification |
|---|---|---|---|---|---|---|---|---|---|---|---|---|
| 1 | Petro Gazz Angels | 3 | 3 | 0 | 9 | 9 | 2 | 4.500 | 272 | 232 | 1.172 | Championship |
| 2 | Creamline Cool Smashers | 3 | 2 | 1 | 6 | 7 | 3 | 2.333 | 236 | 201 | 1.174 | Championship |
| 3 | Akari Chargers | 3 | 1 | 2 | 2 | 3 | 8 | 0.375 | 224 | 256 | 0.875 | 3rd place |
| 4 | Choco Mucho Flying Titans | 3 | 0 | 3 | 1 | 3 | 9 | 0.333 | 241 | 284 | 0.849 | 3rd place |

Source: Premier Volleyball League

==== Match log ====
2025 PVL Reinforced Conference final round match log
Total: 5–3 (11 points)
Quarterfinals: 2–0 (4 points)

| Match | Date | Opponent | Sets | Total | Location Attendance | Series | Report |
|---|---|---|---|---|---|---|---|
| 1 | March 15, 2025 | Galeries Tower | 3–2 | 106–96 | PhilSports Arena; 1,873 | 1–0 | P2 |
| 2 | March 20, 2025 | Galeries Tower | 3–2 | 100–102 | Ynares Center Antipolo; 2,842 | 2–0 | P2 |

Semifinals: 1–2 (2 points)

| Match | Date | Opponent | Sets | Total | Location Attendance | Record | Pts | Report |
|---|---|---|---|---|---|---|---|---|
| 1 | March 29, 2025 | Choco Mucho | 3–2 | 108–106 | Ynares Center Antipolo; 5,915 | 1–0 | 2 | P2 |
| 2 | April 1, 2025 | Creamline | 0–3 | 56–75 | PhilSports Arena; 6,152 | 1–1 | 2 | P2 |
| 3 | April 3, 2025 | Petro Gazz | 0–3 | 60–75 | Smart Araneta Coliseum; 5,471 | 1–2 | 2 | P2 |

Third-place series: 2–1 (5 points)

| Match | Date | Opponent | Sets | Total | Location Attendance | Series | Report |
|---|---|---|---|---|---|---|---|
| 1 | April 8, 2025 | Choco Mucho | 3–2 | 110–95 | Smart Araneta Coliseum; 5,526 | 1–0 | P2 |
| 2 | April 10, 2025 | Choco Mucho | 1–3 | 88–102 | Smart Araneta Coliseum; 6,457 | 1–1 | P2 |
| 3 | April 12, 2025 | Choco Mucho | 3–0 | 81–98 | PhilSports Arena; 4,931 | 2–1 | P2 |

== Transactions ==
=== Additions ===
| Player | Date signed | Previous team | Ref. |
|---|---|---|---|
| Grethcel Soltones | January 3, 2024 | Petro Gazz Angels | |
| Celine Domingo | January 6, 2024 | Creamline Cool Smashers | |
| Max Juangco | February 5, 2024 | FEU Lady Tamaraws (UAAP) | |
| Kamille Cal | May 20, 2024 | Nxled Chameleons | |
| Ivy Lacsina | May 20, 2024 | Nxled Chameleons | |
| Dani Ravena | May 20, 2024 | Nxled Chameleons | |
| Camille Victoria | May 20, 2024 | Nxled Chameleons | |
| Stephanie Bustrillo | July 11, 2024 | UP Fighting Maroons (UAAP) | |
| Cathrine Almazan | July 17, 2024 | EAC Lady Generals (NCAA) | |
| Ysabela Bakabak | July 17, 2024 | De La Salle Lady Spikers (UAAP) | |

=== Subtractions ===
| Player | New team | Ref. |
|---|---|---|
| Roselle Baliton | Galeries Tower Highrisers | |
| Trisha Genesis | Nxled Chameleons | |
| Jaja Maraguinot | Nxled Chameleons | |
| Bang Pineda | Nxled Chameleons | |
| Dindin Santiago-Manabat | Choco Mucho Flying Titans | |

=== Foreign guest player ===
| Team | Foreign player | Moving from | Ref. |
|---|---|---|---|
| Akari Chargers | (United States) Oluoma Okaro | (Greece) ASP Thetis | |

=== Coaching changes ===
| Team | Outgoing coach | Manner of departure | Replaced by | Ref |
|---|---|---|---|---|
| Akari Chargers | (Brazil) Jorge Edson | Resigned | (Philippines) Raffy Monsuela | |
| Akari Chargers | (Philippines) Raffy Monsuela | Replaced | (Japan) Takayuki Minowa | |
