= 2024–25 Chery Tiggo Crossovers season =

Filipino women's volleyball team season

The 2024–25 Chery Tiggo EV Crossovers season was the fifth season of the Chery Tiggo EV Crossovers, fourth in the Premier Volleyball League (PVL), and twelfth dating back to the original Foton Tornadoes.

Ahead of the 2024–25 All-Filipino Conference, the team enlisted Normal Miguel as the team's new head coach, with Kungfu Reyes reassigned to the assistant coach position. Chery Tiggo acquired also multiple players in Anngela Nunag, Jules Samonte, and Mary Grace Vernaiz. Two players departed the Crossovers with Buding Duremdes headed for the Cignal HD Spikers, and EJ Laure moving to the Nxled Chameleons.

The team started with the 2024–25 All-Filipino Conference with a 4–2 record and 10 points through their first six matches. During the mid-conference break, the team acquired three-time Best Middle Blocker Risa Sato, who was released from the Creamline Cool Smashers. Despite the big acquisition, Chery Tiggo only won one of their remaining five matches in the preliminary round to finish 8th with a 5–6 record and 14 points. They then lost to Choco Mucho in straight sets, bringing them to the play-in tournament. They then beat both of their play-in opponents, Nxled and the Farm Fresh Foxies to advance to the final round, where they were swept by Creamline in the quarterfinals.

== Roster ==
Chery Tiggo Crossovers
No.	Player	Position	Height	Birth date	School
1	(Philippines) Princess Robles	Outside Hitter	1.60 m (5 ft 3 in)	June 7, 1997 (age 29)	NU
2	(Philippines) Abigail Maraño (c)	Middle blocker	1.75 m (5 ft 9 in)	December 22, 1992 (age 33)	DLSU
4	(Philippines) Jasmine Nabor	Setter	1.75 m (5 ft 9 in)	July 11, 1998 (age 28)	NU
5	(Philippines) (Japan) Risa Sato	Middle Blocker	1.76 m (5 ft 9 in)	October 4, 1994 (aged 29)	NU
6	(Philippines) Jules Samonte	Opposite Hitter	1.78 m (5 ft 10 in)	October 22, 1998 (age 27)	ADMU
7	(Philippines) Mylene Paat	Opposite hitter	1.80 m (5 ft 11 in)	April 5, 1994 (age 32)	AdU
9	(Philippines) Jennifer Nierva	Libero	1.63 m (5 ft 4 in)	November 8, 1999 (age 26)	NU
10	(Philippines) Victonara Galang	Outside hitter	1.73 m (5 ft 8 in)	January 4, 1995 (age 31)	DLSU
11	(Philippines) Alina Bicar	Setter	1.68 m (5 ft 6 in)	November 17, 1997 (age 28)	UST
12	(Philippines) Mary Rhose Dapol	Outside Hitter	1.70 m (5 ft 7 in)	December 1, 2000 (age 25)	UPHSD
14	(Philippines) Imee Hernandez	Middle blocker	1.80 m (5 ft 11 in)	November 6, 2000 (age 25)	UST
15	(Philippines) Karen Verdeflor	Libero	1.55 m (5 ft 1 in)	September 24, 2000 (age 25)	ADU
16	(Philippines) Cza Carandang	Middle blocker	1.80 m (5 ft 11 in)	October 11, 1995 (age 30)	FEU
17	(Philippines) Seth Rodriguez	Middle blocker	1.79 m (5 ft 10 in)	September 22, 1998 (age 27)	UE
18	(Philippines) Joyme Cagande	Setter	1.63 m (5 ft 4 in)	February 18, 1999 (age 27)	NU
21	(Philippines) Anngela Nunag	Libero	1.60 m (5 ft 3 in)	December 21, 1991 (age 34)	RTU
22	(Philippines) Ponggay Gaston	Opposite hitter	1.79 m (5 ft 10 in)	August 27, 1997 (age 28)	ADMU
23	(Philippines) Shaya Adorador	Outside Hitter	1.72 m (5 ft 8 in)	December 9, 1997 (age 28)	UE

Coaching staff

- Head coach:
  (Philippines) Norman Miguel
- Assistant coaches:
  (Philippines) Robertly Boto
  (Philippines) Erickson Ramos
  (Philippines) Sgt. Emilio "Kung Fu" Reyes
  (Philippines) Mark Gil Alfafara

Team staff

- Team manager:
  (Philippines) Aaron Vélez
- S&C Coach:
  (Philippines) Raf Magno
  (Philippines) Sonny Montalvo
- Physical therapist:
  (Philippines) Cyrine Gonzaga
- Social media manager:
  (Philippines) Daleth Louie Son

Medical staff

- Physical therapist:
  (Philippines) Maco Pili

== 2024–25 All-Filipino Conference ==
=== Preliminary round ===
==== Standings ====
Pos	Team	Pld	W	L	Pts	SW	SL	SR	SPW	SPL	SPR	Qualification
6	Farm Fresh Foxies	11	5	6	15	18	22	0.818	847	915	0.926	Qualifying round
7	Akari Chargers	11	5	6	15	16	22	0.727	844	868	0.972	Qualifying round
8	Chery Tiggo Crossovers	11	5	6	14	20	24	0.833	957	966	0.991	Qualifying round
9	Zus Coffee Thunderbelles	11	4	7	14	20	23	0.870	958	962	0.996	Qualifying round
10	Galeries Tower Highrisers	11	1	10	5	10	30	0.333	835	949	0.880	Qualifying round

Source: Premier Volleyball League

==== Match log ====
2024–25 PVL All-Filipino Conference preliminary round match log
Total: 5–6 (14 points)
November: 2–1 (5 points)

Match	Date	Opponent	Sets	Total	Location Attendance	Record	Pts	Report
1	November 12, 2024	Capital1	3–2	107–102	PhilSports Arena; 777	1–0	2	P2
2	November 21, 2024	Cignal	1–3	83–95	Filoil EcoOil Centre; 847	1–1	2	P2
3	November 26, 2024	Nxled	3–0	76–57	PhilSports Arena; 530	2–1	5	P2

December: 2–1 (5 points)

Match	Date	Opponent	Sets	Total	Location Attendance	Record	Pts	Report
4	December 3, 2024	PLDT	3–1	95–82	Smart Araneta Coliseum; 5,229	3–1	8	P2
5	December 10, 2024	Akari	1–3	87–98	PhilSports Arena; 901	3–2	8	P2
6	December 14, 2024	Galeries Tower	3–2	109–102	PhilSports Arena; 3,095	4–2	10	P2

January: 1–2 (4 points)

Match	Date	Opponent	Sets	Total	Location Attendance	Record	Pts	Report
7	January 21, 2025	Petro Gazz	2–3	95–105	PhilSports Arena; 2,372	4–3	11	P2
8	January 25, 2025	Farm Fresh	3–1	96–76	PhilSports Arena; 500	5–3	14	P2
9	January 30, 2025	Zus Coffee	1–3	89–98	PhilSports Arena; 277	5–4	14	P2

February: 0–2 (0 points)

Match	Date	Opponent	Sets	Total	Location Attendance	Record	Pts	Report
10	February 6, 2025	Creamline	0–3	55–75	PhilSports Arena; 1,931	5–5	14	P2
11	February 22, 2025	Choco Mucho	0–3	65–76	City of Passi Arena; 2,997	5–6	14	P2

=== Qualifying round ===
==== Match log ====
2024–25 PVL All-Filipino Conference qualifying round match log
Total: 0–1 (0 points)
Qualifying round: 0–1 (0 points)

Date	Opponent	Sets	Total	Location Attendance	Report
March 1, 2025	Choco Mucho	0–3	75–67	PhilSports Arena; 2,952	P2

=== Play-in tournament ===
==== Pool B standings ====
Pos	Team	Pld	W	L	Pts	SW	SL	SR	SPW	SPL	SPR	Qualification
1	Chery Tiggo Crossovers	2	2	0	6	6	1	6.000	170	153	1.111	Final round
2	Nxled Chameleons	2	1	1	3	3	3	1.000	133	128	1.039	
3	Farm Fresh Foxies	2	0	2	0	1	6	0.167	147	169	0.870	

Source: Premier Volleyball League

==== Match log ====
2024–25 PVL All-Filipino Conference play-in tournament match log
Total: 2–0 (6 points)
Play-in tournament: 2–0 (6 points)

Match	Date	Opponent	Sets	Total	Location Attendance	Record	Pts	Report
1	March 6, 2025	Nxled	3–0	76–58	PhilSports Arena; 420	1–0	3	P2
2	March 11, 2025	Farm Fresh	3–1	94–95	PhilSports Arena; 311	2–0	6	P2

=== Final round ===
==== Bracket ====
Quarterfinals
1	Creamline	2
8	Chery Tiggo	0
2	Petro Gazz	2
7	Zus Coffee	1
3	Galeries Tower	0
6	Akari	2
4	PLDT	0
5	Choco Mucho	2

Semifinals
Creamline	6
Petro Gazz	9
Choco Mucho	1
Akari	2

Finals
Championship
Creamline	1
Petro Gazz	2
Third-place
Choco Mucho	1
Akari	2

==== Match log ====
2024–25 PVL All-Filipino Conference final round match log
Total: 0–2 (0 points)
Quarterfinals: 0–2 (0 points)

Match	Date	Opponent	Sets	Total	Location Attendance	Series	Report
1	March 18, 2025	Creamline	0–3	56–77	PhilSports Arena; 1,783	0–1	P2
2	March 22, 2025	Creamline	1–3	90–95	Ynares Center Antipolo; 4,409	0–2	P2

== Transactions ==
=== Additions ===
Player	Date signed	Previous team	Ref.
Anngela Nunag	Undisclosed	Cignal HD Spikers	
Jules Samonte	October 30, 2024	PLDT High Speed Hitters	
Risa Sato	January 15, 2025	Creamline Cool Smashers	
Mary Grace Vernaiz	Undisclosed	UST Golden Tigresses (UAAP)	

=== Subtractions ===
Player	New team	Ref.
Buding Duremdes	Cignal HD Spikers	
EJ Laure	Nxled Chameleons	
