= 2026 Akari Chargers season =

The 2026 Akari Chargers season may refer to:

- 2025–26 Akari Chargers season
- 2026–27 Akari Chargers season
