= Judith Abil =

Filipino volleyball player (born 1997)

Personal information
- Nationality: Filipino
- Born: December 4, 1997 (age 28)
- Hometown: Iligan, Philippines
- Height: 168 cm (5 ft 6 in)
- Education: University of the East

Volleyball information
- Position: Outside Hitter/ Libero
- Current team: Akari Chargers

Judith Abil (born December 4, 1997) is a Filipina volleyball player who is an outside hitter and libero for the Akari Chargers of the Premier Volleyball League (PVL). She played for the UE Lady Warriors in the UAAP women's volleyball tournaments.

== Career ==
=== Collegiate ===
Abil played as an Outside Hitter for the Lady Warriors of the University of the East in the University Athletic Association of the Philippines (UAAP).

She ended her stint with UE in Season 81, where they failed to advanced in the semifinals round.

=== Clubs ===
In 2017, Abil became part of the Cherrylume Iron Lady Warriors, which composed of players from UE Lady Warriors and played in the Philippine Super Liga.

In 2018, she signed with Tacloban Fighting Warays and played in the Premier Volleyball League.

In 2019, she played with Marinerang Pilipina Lady Skippers in the PSL for 2 consecutive conferences.

In 2021, she joined the debuting team, UAC Power Hitters in the PVL but, the team cancelled their participation to join the league. After UAC's cancellation to join the league, she signed with BaliPure Purest Water Defenders.

In 2022, she joined KMS-Quezon City Lady Vikings in the PNVF Champions League, where they bagged bronze medal.

In 2023, she joined Nxled Chameleons, where the team is at 9th place.

In 2024, she joined the first PVL Rookie Draft Combine featuring the free agent players, as well as, Filipino-blooded Rookies from different Universities inside and outside the Philippines. After the event, she was signed by the Cignal HD Spikers.

== Clubs ==
- Cherrylume Iron Lady Warriors (2017)
- Tacloban Fighting Warays (2018)
- Marinerang Pilipina Lady Skippers (2019)
- UAC Power Hitters (2021) (team did not play)
- BaliPure Purest Water Defenders (2021)
- KMS-Quezon City Lady Vikings (2022)
- Nxled Chameleons (2023)
- Cignal HD Spikers/Super Spikers (2024–2025)
- Akari Chargers (2026–present)

== Awards ==
=== Collegiate ===
Year	League	Season/Conference	Title	Ref
2018	PSL	Collegiate	Runner-up	

=== Clubs ===
Year	League	Season/Conference	Club	Title	Ref
2024	PVL	Reinforced	Cignal HD Spikers	3rd place	
2024	PVL	Invitational	Cignal HD Spikers	Runner-up	
