= UAC Power Hitters =

Professional Volleyball club in Manila

- Full name: Unlimited Athletics Club Power Hitters
- Short name: UAC
- Nickname: UAC Power Hitters
- Founded: 2021
- Dissolved: 2021
- League: Premier Volleyball League

Uniforms
Home	Away

The Unlimited Athletics Club Power Hitters, shortened as the UAC Power Hitters, were a women's professional volleyball team in the Philippines. The team planned to compete in the Premier Volleyball League (PVL) beginning with the 2021 Open Conference before deciding to take a leave of absence.

== History ==
The Unlimited Athletics Club was originally formed as the Peak Form Lady Spikers and slated to be one of the new teams debuting in the Premier Volleyball League's 2021 season. The team was organized by Jovito Ong of the Philippine Confederation of Sports Development Foundation and sponsored by Peak Form, a sports conditioning and recovery center. In March 2021, the team reverted their name to UAC. On June 28, 2021, the PVL announced that the team has taken a leave of absence due to its inability to complete its roster for the 2021 PVL Open Conference. As of 2026, UAC has yet to compete.

== Planned roster ==
For the 2021 Premier Volleyball League Open Conference.

No.	Name	Position	Height	Alma mater	Date of birth
1	(Philippines) Judith Abil	Outside Hitter	1.68 m (5 ft 6 in)	UE	December 4, 1997 (age 28)
2	(Philippines) Souzan Raslan	Outside Hitter	1.73 m (5 ft 8 in)	San Lorenzo	January 1, 1995 (age 31)
3	(Philippines) Coleen Laurice Bravo	Middle Blocker	1.82 m (6 ft 0 in)	Perpetual	December 7, 1995 (age 30)
5	(Philippines) Fatima Bia General	Libero	1.65 m (5 ft 5 in)	NU	August 27, 1995 (age 30)
6	(Philippines) Angelica Dacaymat	Outside Hitter	1.67 m (5 ft 6 in)	UE	
7	(Philippines) Remcel Joyce Santos	Middle Blocker	1.88 m (6 ft 2 in)	UE	July 10, 1996 (age 29)
8	(Philippines) Angeli Pauline Araneta	Opposite Hitter	1.78 m (5 ft 10 in)	UP Diliman	September 19, 1993 (age 32)
9	(Philippines) Jessma Clarice Ramos	Middle Blocker	1.72 m (5 ft 8 in)	UP Diliman	March 27, 1998 (age 28)
11	(Philippines) Sheeka Gin Espinosa	Outside Hitter	1.68 m (5 ft 6 in)	TIP	August 26, 1996 (age 29)
12	(Philippines) Mikaela Lopez	Middle Blocker	1.68 m (5 ft 6 in)	CSJL	December 4, 1997 (age 28)
15	(Philippines) Maria Angelica Legacion	Setter	1.62 m (5 ft 4 in)	Arellano	August 15, 1993 (age 32)
16	(Philippines) Rose Mary Cailing	Setter	1.68 m (5 ft 6 in)	UP Diliman	February 10, 1998 (age 28)
17	(Philippines) Mary Dominique Pacres	Opposite Hitter	1.75 m (5 ft 9 in)	UST	September 23, 1997 (age 28)
18	(Philippines) Mialyn Manabat	Libero	1.67 m (5 ft 6 in)	UE	July 18, 1998 (age 27)

Head coach

- (Philippines) Edgar Barroga

- C Team Captain
- I Import
- DP Draft Pick
- R Rookie
- IN Inactive
- S Suspended
- FA Free Agent
- Injured

== Honors ==
=== Team ===
Season	Conference	Title
2021	Open	(Not competing)

== Coaches ==
- (Philippines) Edgar Barroga (2021)

== Team captain ==
- (Philippines) Maria Carmela Tunay (2021)
