= Justine Jazareno =

Filipino volleyball player

Personal information
- Full name: Ylizyeth Justine Jazareno
- Nationality: Filipino
- Born: March 25, 2000 (age 26) Lipa, Batangas, Philippines
- Education: De La Salle University (2023)
- Height: 1.60 m (5 ft 3 in)

Volleyball information
- Position: Libero
- Current club: Akari Chargers
- Number: 15

Career
- Years: Team
- 2023–present: Akari Chargers

National team
- Years: Team
- 2024–present: Philippines
Honours
Women's volleyball
Representing Philippines
SEA V.League
Bronze medal – third place	2025 Nakhon Ratchasima	Leg 1
Bronze medal – third place	2025 Ninh Bình	Leg 2

Ylizyeth Justine Jazareno (born March 25, 2000) is a Filipino professional volleyball player who plays as a libero for and serves as team captain for the Akari Chargers of the Premier Volleyball League (PVL).

== Career ==
=== College ===
Jazareno played for the Lady Spikers of the De La Salle University in the University Athletic Association of the Philippines (UAAP) initially as a spiker first but turned to libero in her second year.

She played her last playing year in the UAAP in Season 85, where they bagged the championship title against NU Lady Bulldogs.

=== Club ===
After the conclusion of UAAP Season 85 in 2023, Jazareno made herself available to get signed by a Premier Volleyball League (PVL) club. By this time the PVL has already professionalized. She was signed by the Akari Chargers.

After 1 conference of playing with the Chargers, she announced her leave of absence in the league due to her pregnancy. She came back in action in the 2024–25 season of the PVL.

=== National team ===
In August 2025, she became part of Philippine national team. She was part of the squad which competed in the Leg 1 and 2 of 2025 SEA Women's V.League and SEA Games.

== Clubs ==
- (Philippines) Akari Chargers (2023–present)

== Awards ==
=== Individuals ===
Year	League	Season/Conference	Award	Ref
2017	UAAP (girls')	79	Best Server	
2018	UAAP (girls')	80	Best Server	
2019	UAAP (girls')	81	Finals MVP	
2025	SEA V.League	2nd Leg	Best Libero	

=== Collegiate ===
DLSU Lady Spikers

Year	League	Season/Conference	Title	Ref
2023	UAAP	85	Champion	

=== Clubs ===
==== PVL ====
Year	Conference	Club	Title	Ref
2024–25	All-Filipino	Akari Chargers	3rd place	
2025	Reinforced	Akari Chargers	3rd place	

=== National team ===
Year	League	Season/Conference	Title	Ref
2025	SEA V.League	1st Leg	Bronze	
2025	SEA V.League	2nd Leg	Bronze	
