= Dani Ravena =

Filipino volleyball player (born 1999)

Personal information
- Nationality: Filipino
- Born: Danielle Theris Crisologo Ravena; December 6, 1999 (age 26)
- Height: 167 cm (5 ft 6 in)
- Education: Ateneo de Manila University (2017–2022)

Volleyball information
- Position: Libero

Career
Years	Teams
2018	Motolite Power Builders
2022–2023	Akari Chargers
2023–2024	Nxled Chameleons
2024–2026	Akari Chargers

Danielle Theris Crisologo Ravena (born December 6, 1999) is a Filipina volleyball player who last played for the Akari Chargers of the Premier Volleyball League (PVL).

== Early life and education ==
Danielle Theris Ravena was born on December 6, 1999 to a family of athletes. Her father Bong Ravena was a professional basketball player and her mother is a collegiate volleyball player. Dani Ravena and her older brothers Kiefer and Thirdy attended the Ateneo de Manila University. Her brothers played for Ateneo's basketball team.

== Career ==
=== Collegiate ===
Dani Ravena played for the Ateneo Blue Eagles women's volleyball team debuting in Season 80 in the University Athletic Association of the Philippines (UAAP). She helped the team win the UAAP Season 81 women's volleyball title in 2019. In her early years, she played as a setter before transitioning to a libero.

In 2021, Ravena was named as the captain of Ateneo, becoming the first ever libero in Philippine volleyball history to do so after the FIVB lifted the restriction.

She ended her collegiate career in Season 84 in 2022.

=== Club ===
Ravena has played for the Ateneo-back Motolite Power Builders at the 2018 Open Conference of the Premier Volleyball League (PVL). Motolite finished second.

After graduating from Ateneo, Ravena rejoined the PVL signing up for the Akari Chargers ahead of the 2022 Reinforced Conference after undergoing a try-out process. Her mother, Mozzy Ravena, serves as the team manager. Ravena has addressed suggestions of preferential treatment by stating that she aims to prove her place on the team based on merit. She has served as a backup setter.

Ravena was later moved to Akari's sister team, the Nxled Chameleons. She was named captain for the club for the 2023 Second All-Filipino Conference.

Ravena later returned to Akari in the lead up to 2024 Reinforced Conference.
