= Cza Carandang =

Filipino volleyball player

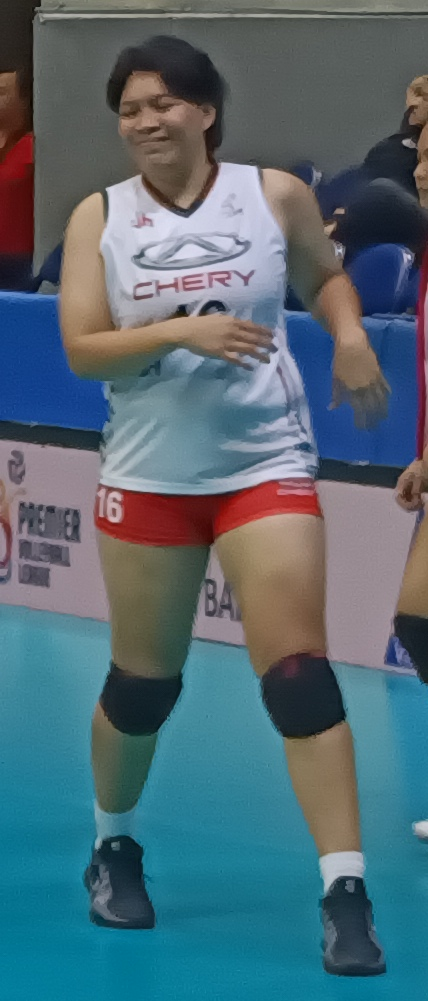
- Carandang in 2025

Personal information
- Full name: Czarina Grace Carandang
- Nickname: Cza
- Nationality: Filipino
- Born: November 26, 1997 (age 28)
- Height: 5 ft 7 in (1.70 m)
- Education: Far Eastern University

Volleyball information
- Position: Middle Blocker
- Current club: Akari Chargers

Career
Years	Teams
2018	PayMaya High Flyers
2021	BanKo Perlas Spikers
2022–2025	Chery Tiggo Crossovers
2026	Akari Chargers

Czarina Grace Carandang (born November 26, 1997) is a Filipino professional volleyball player who last played as a middle blocker for the Akari Chargers in the Premier Volleyball League (PVL). Carandang played for the FEU Lady Tamaraws in college.

== Career ==
=== Collegiate ===
Carandang made her first game appearance with the FEU Lady Tamaraws in UAAP in the UAAP Season 79 where her team placed in 4th.

Her team got a 10–4 win–loss record in the elimination round of UAAP Season 80 women's volleyball tournament. FEU Lady Tamaraws won over Ateneo Lady eagles in playoffs and semifinals, and sent FEU to its first finals appearance after 9-year drought.

UAAP Season 83 was supposedly the last playing year of Carandang for the Lady Tamaraws, but due to the COVID-19 pandemic, the tournament was still cancelled, and she decided to forgo her final year to go pro.

== Clubs ==
- (Philippines) PayMaya High Flyers (2018)
- (Philippines) BanKo Perlas Spikers (2021)
- (Philippines) Chery Tiggo Crossovers (2022–2025)
- (Philippines) Akari Chargers (2026–present)

== Awards ==
Premier Volleyball League

- Medals:
  - Runner-up: 2017 Collegiate, 2018 Reinforced, 2018 Collegiate

UAAP women's volleyball

- Medals:
  - Runner-up: 2018 (Season 80)

PNVF Champions League

- Medals:
  - Third place: 2024
