= UAAP Season 85 volleyball tournaments =

Volleyball tournaments

UAAP Season 85
- Rise as One
- Host school: Adamson University (Season and collegiate); University of the East (High school)
Men's Finals	G1	G2	Wins
NU Bulldogs	3	3	2
UST Golden Spikers	2	0	0
- Duration: May 10–14, 2023
- Arena(s): SM Mall of Asia Arena
- Finals MVP: Ave Joshua Retamar
- Winning coach: Dante Alinsunurin
- Semifinalists: FEU Tamaraws; De La Salle Green Spikers
- TV network(s): One Sports, UAAP Varsity Channel
Women's Finals	G1	G2	Wins
De La Salle Lady Spikers	3	3	2
NU Lady Bulldogs	2	2	0
- Duration: May 7–14, 2023
- Arena(s): Araneta Coliseum (Game 1); SM Mall of Asia Arena (Game 2)
- Finals MVP: Marionne Angelique Alba
- Winning coach: Ramil de Jesus
- Semifinalists: Adamson Lady Falcons; UST Golden Tigresses
- TV network(s): One Sports, UAAP Varsity Channel
Boys' Finals	G1	G2	G3	Wins
NUNS Bullpups	3	2	0	1
FEU–D Baby Tamaraws	2	3	3	2
- Duration: March 18–21, 2023
- Arena(s): Paco Arena
- Finals MVP: Rhodson Du-ot
- Winning coach: RJay del Rosario
- Semifinalists: UE Junior Red Warriors; UST Tiger Cubs
Girls' Finals	G1	G2	G3	Wins
NUNS Lady Bullpups	3	2	3	2
Adamson Lady Baby Falcons	2	3	0	1
- Duration: March 16–20, 2023
- Arena(s): Paco Arena
- Finals MVP: Abegail Pono
- Winning coach: Vilet Ponce-de Leon

The UAAP Season 85 volleyball tournaments were the University Athletic Association of the Philippines (UAAP) volleyball tournaments for the 2022–23 school year. This was the first completed tournament since 2019.

The collegiate men's and women's tournaments began on February 25, 2023.

The high school boys' and girls' tournaments began earlier on February 13, 2023.

This is the first tournament for men's, boys' and girls' since the COVID-19 pandemic.

== Tournament format ==
The UAAP continued to use the Final Four with an updated format in stepladder prior to the start of Season 85, which was to scrapped the "undue advantage" bestowed to second seed team.

The league reverted to its pre-pandemic Wednesday, Saturday and Sunday schedule and protocols such as handshakes and court-side switches between the two teams.

It will also reintroduce the use of video challenge system beginning second round of the tournaments. This will give each team two challenges per set to review questionable calls by the officials.

Mike Verano appointed as the UAAP Volleyball commissioner for this season.

== Teams ==
All eight member universities of the UAAP fielded teams in collegiate division while 7 (boys') and 6 (girls') teams in high school, respectively.

Collegiate division
University	Men		Women	
University	Team	Coach	Team	Coach
Adamson University (AdU)	Soaring Falcons	George Pascua	Lady Falcons	Jerry Yee and Jay Chua
Ateneo de Manila University (AdMU)	Blue Eagles	Timothy Sto. Tomas	Blue Eagles	Oliver Almadro
De La Salle University (DLSU)	Green Spikers	Arnold Laniog	Lady Spikers	Ramil De Jesus and Noel Orcullo
Far Eastern University (FEU)	Tamaraws	Rey Diaz	Lady Tamaraws	Tina Salak
National University (NU)	Bulldogs	Dante Alinsunurin	Lady Bulldogs	Ray Karl Dimaculangan
University of the East (UE)	Red Warriors	Jerome Guhit	Lady Red Warriors	Ronwald Kris Dimaculangan
University of the Philippines Diliman (UP)	Fighting Maroons	Rald Ricafort	Fighting Maroons	Shaq Delos Santos
University of Santo Tomas (UST)	Golden Spikers	Arthur Alan Mamon	Golden Tigresses	Kungfu Reyes

High School division
High school	Boys' team	Girls' team
Adamson University (AdU)	Baby Falcons	Lady Baby Falcons
Ateneo de Manila University (AdMU)	Blue Eagles	—N/a
De La Salle Santiago Zobel School (DLSZ)	Junior Archers	Junior Lady Archers
Far Eastern University Diliman (FEU-D)	Baby Tamaraws	Lady Baby Tamaraws
Nazareth School of National University (NSNU)	Bullpups	Lady Bullpups
University of the East (UE)	Junior Warriors	—N/a
University of the Philippines Integrated School (UPIS)	—N/a	Junior Fighting Maroons
University of Santo Tomas Senior High School (UST)	Tiger Cubs	Junior Tigresses

=== Name changes ===
- Ateneo Lady Eagles and Ateneo Blue Eaglets: On May 5, 2022, Ateneo announced that all of its UAAP teams, regardless of gender, sport or division will now be called the "Blue Eagles".

=== Coaching changes ===
Team	Outgoing coach	Manner of departure	Date	Replaced by	Date
Adamson Soaring Falcons	Domingo Custodio		July 27, 2022	George Pascua	July 27, 2022
Adamson Lady Falcons	Lerma Giron		July 1, 2022	Jerry Yee and Jay Chua	July 1, 2022
FEU Lady Tamaraws	George Pascua		July 13, 2022	Tina Salak	July 13, 2022
UP Fighting Maroons (women)	Godfrey Okumu		August 15, 2022	Shaq Delos Santos	August 15, 2022

== Venues ==
Volleyball venues for collegiate (red) and high school (cyan) tournaments

The UAAP released its schedule on February 9. Opening weekend is at SM Mall of Asia Arena in Pasay, with games at PhilSports Arena in Pasig, Araneta Coliseum in Quezon City, and Filoil EcoOil Centre in San Juan.

For Wednesday quadrupleheaders, the men's tournament played at the PhilSports Arena in Pasig; on all other game days, the men's teams played on the same venue and day as their corresponding women's team. For high school teams, the tournaments played at Paco Arena in Manila.

Arena	Location	Tournament				Capacity
Arena	Location	M	W	B	G	Capacity
Araneta Coliseum	Quezon City	check	check			14,429
Filoil EcoOil Centre	San Juan	check	check			6,000
Paco Arena	Manila			check	check	1,000
PhilSports Arena	Pasig	check	check			10,000
SM Mall of Asia Arena	Pasay	check	check			15,000

== Squads ==
Each team has a 20-player roster, of which four are reserves. Only one foreign student athlete (FSA) or import is allowed to be on the active roster.

=== Imports ===
Men's imports
Team	Import	Nationality
Adamson Soaring Falcons	none	
Ateneo Blue Eagles	Kalle Blomstedt	Sweden
De La Salle Green Archers	none	
FEU Tamaraws	none	
NU Bulldogs	Obed Mukaba	Congo
UE Red Warriors	none	
UP Fighting Maroons	none	
UST Golden Spikers	none	

== Men's tournament ==
=== Team line-up ===
Adamson Soaring Falcons
No.	Name	Position
1	ALEGRE, Grant Carlo	S
2	CANLAS, Lorences	
3	GUTIERREZ, Dan Russel	
4	YBOA, John Anthony	
6	PACQUING, Ned Calvert	OH
7	TAKEDA, Jhon Maru	L
8	COGUIMBAL, Mark Leo	MB
9	DE LARA, Mar Angelo	MB
10	CASAS, Francis	OH
12	PAULINO, Marc Kenneth	OH
13	AGUILAR, Jude Christian (c)	OP
14	GAY, John Eugenio	OP
15	MAGALAMAN, Joshua	MB
16	NOVILLO, Evander	
	PASCUA, George	HC

Ateneo Blue Eagles
No.	Name	Position
1	MAGADIA, Lawrence Gil	S
2	CRISOSTOMO, Leinuel	OH
4	GOPIO, Jettlee	MB
5	BATAS, Kennedy	OP
6	TANEO, Lutrelle Andre	
7	LICAUCO, James Daniel	S
8	PACINIO, Amil Jr.	OH
10	TRINIDAD, Paulo Lorenzo	L
11	LLENOS, Canciano	OH
13	DE CASTRO, Lance Andrei (c)	L
14	GO, Emmanuel	S
17	SENDON, Jeric	
18	SALARZON, Jian Matthew	OH
22	ABSIN, Charles David	MB
	STO. TOMAS, Timothy	HC

De La Salle Green Spikers
No.	Name	Position
1	RONQUILLO, John Mark	OP
3	ANIMA, Billie Jean-Henri	MB
4	SUMALINOG, John Raphael	L
5	MARATA, Von	OP
6	GUERRERO, Menard	L
7	MAGLINAO, Vince Gerard (c)	OH
8	POQUITA, Diogenes III	S
9	KAMPTON, Noel Michael	OH
10	ESPEJO, Andre	OH
11	SERRANO, Angel Paul	S
13	DEL PILAR, Nathaniel	MB
18	DE JESUS, Jules Carlo	OH
22	RODRIGUEZ, Joshua Jamiel	MB
24	PHILLIPS, Benjamin	MB
	LANIOG, Arnold	HC

FEU Tamaraws
No.	Name	Position
1	DOMINGO, Herald	MB
2	CODILLA, Jomel	OH
3	CACAO, Ariel	S
4	DE GUZMAN, Bryce	L
5	TALISAYAN, Jelord (c)	OH
6	CALADO, Mark	OH
7	JAVELONA, Jose Magdalino	OH
8	SABANAL, Reymond	MB
9	SAAVEDRA, Zhydryx	OP
12	CABATAC, Carl Johnard	
14	BUGAOAN, Martin	MB
15	CELAJES, Jacob	L
16	ABUNIAWAN, Jefferson	MB
17	MARTINEZ, Benny	S
	DIAZ, Reynaldo Jr.	HC

NU Bulldogs
No.	Name	Position
1	ALMENDRAS, Angelo Nicolas	OH
2	BELOSTRINO, Clarenz	S
5	RAMONES, Kyle Adrien	MB
6	BUDDIN, Michaelo	OH
8	SUMAGUI, Jann Mariono	L
9	LUMANLAN, Louis	MB
10	MUKABA, Obed	MB
11	MALINIS, Kennry	OP
13	RETAMAR, Ave Joshua (c)	S
16	JALECO, Bryan James	L
18	ARINGO, Leo Jr.	OH
20	BELLO, Joseph	S
22	FORTUNA, Michael John	OP
23	DIAO, Jenngerard Arnfranz	MB
	ALINSUNURIN, Dante	HC

UE Red Warriors
No.	Name	Position
1	TORRES, Giles Jeffer	MB
2	IMPERIAL, Ralph Ryan (c)	S
3	POZAS, Joshua	
4	CAMAYMAYAN, Xjhann Viandre	
5	REYES, Jose Mari	
6	LAMIS, Steve Kent	
7	MANGAHIS, John Paul	OH
9	SOLIS, Aldwin	L
10	DE LIMA, Eryn Maui	L
11	JOSAFAT, Lloyd	OP
13	DEFEO, Axel	
15	ANDAYA, John Michael	MB
16	CULABAT, Kenneth Roi	OH
20	REYES, Angelo	OP
	GUHIT, Jerome	HC

UP Fighting Maroons
No.	Name	Position
1	IJIRAN, Ruskin	MB
2	GAMBAN, Louis (c)	OH
4	RUBIN, Jessie	
5	NICOLAS, Daniel	MB
7	VELASQUEZ, Redhen	S
8	SANTIAGO, Clarence	S
9	LAGANDO, Angelo	OP
11	EUSEBIO, Erl	OH
12	CAJOLO, Ranz	OP
13	ADVINCULA, Emmanuel	MB
14	JUNTILLA, Johnlee	L
15	MALABANAN, Jaivee	OH
18	TUQUERO, Neuford	L
21	LIPATA, Angelo	MB
	RICAFORT, Rald	HC

UST Golden Spikers
No.	Name	Position
1	DE VEGA, Rey Miguel	OH
3	MAGPAYO, Charlee	MB
4	TAMAN, Abdul Aziz	OH
5	CRUZ, Lorence (c)	S
6	DEDOROY, John Emmanuel	OP
7	YAMBAO, Dux Euan	S
8	SEÑORON, Jhun Lorenz	OP
10	FLOR, Rainier	MB
12	SISON, Rayven Cameron	OH
13	YBAÑEZ, Josh	OH
14	TAJANLANGIT, Jesse Emmanuel	L
16	COLINARES, Edlyn Paul	MB
18	PRUDENCIADO, Van Tracy	L
24	DE LA NOCHE, Jay Rack	OP
	MAMON, Arthur Odjie	HC

Legend
S	Setter
MB	Middle Blocker
OH	Outside Hitter
OP	Opposite Hitter
L	Libero
(c)	Team Captain
HC	Head coach

=== Elimination round ===
==== Team standings ====
Pos	Team	Pld	W	L	Pts	SW	SL	SR	SPW	SPL	SPR	Qualification
1	NU Bulldogs	14	14	0	40	42	9	4.667	1234	1012	1.219	Advance to the finals (Note: As NU won all of their elimination round games, the stepladder format will be used instead of the regular Final Four format.)
2	UST Golden Spikers	14	11	3	32	37	18	2.056	1294	1189	1.088	Proceed to stepladder round 2
3	FEU Tamaraws	14	8	6	27	33	24	1.375	1293	1258	1.028	Proceed to stepladder round 1
4	De La Salle Green Spikers	14	8	6	24	29	22	1.318	1173	1126	1.042	Proceed to stepladder round 1
5	Ateneo Blue Eagles	14	7	7	18	26	30	0.867	1259	1250	1.007	
6	UE Red Warriors	14	5	9	15	24	32	0.750	1207	1253	0.963	
7	Adamson Soaring Falcons (H)	14	2	12	8	13	38	0.342	1026	1213	0.846	
8	UP Fighting Maroons	14	1	13	4	10	41	0.244	1058	1243	0.851	

Source: UAAP on Twitter
Rules for classification: 1) number of wins; 2) if tied for No. 2 or 4, one-game playoff; 3) match points; 4) sets ratio; 5) points ratio; 6) head-to-head record
(H) Host

==== Match-up results ====
	Round 1							Round 2						
Team ╲ Game	1	2	3	4	5	6	7	8	9	10	11	12	13	14
Adamson	UE school colors	NU school colors	FEU school colors	UST school colors	Ateneo school colors	La Salle school colors	UP school colors	UST school colors	Ateneo school colors	NU school colors	UE school colors	La Salle school colors	UP school colors	FEU school colors
Ateneo	NU school colors	UE school colors	La Salle school colors	FEU school colors	Adamson school colors	UST school colors	UP school colors	UE school colors	Adamson school colors	UP school colors	UST school colors	FEU school colors	La Salle school colors	NU school colors
La Salle	UST school colors	UP school colors	Ateneo school colors	UE school colors	FEU school colors	Adamson school colors	NU school colors	NU school colors	FEU school colors	UST school colors	UP school colors	Adamson school colors	Ateneo school colors	UE school colors
FEU	UP school colors	UST school colors	Adamson school colors	Ateneo school colors	La Salle school colors	UE school colors	NU school colors	UP school colors	La Salle school colors	UE school colors	NU school colors	Ateneo school colors	UST school colors	Adamson school colors
NU	Ateneo school colors	Adamson school colors	UST school colors	UP school colors	UE school colors	FEU school colors	La Salle school colors	La Salle school colors	UP school colors	Adamson school colors	FEU school colors	UE school colors	UST school colors	Ateneo school colors
UE	Adamson school colors	Ateneo school colors	UP school colors	La Salle school colors	NU school colors	FEU school colors	UST school colors	Ateneo school colors	UST school colors	FEU school colors	Adamson school colors	NU school colors	UP school colors	La Salle school colors
UP	FEU school colors	La Salle school colors	UE school colors	NU school colors	UST school colors	Ateneo school colors	Adamson school colors	FEU school colors	NU school colors	Ateneo school colors	La Salle school colors	Adamson school colors	UE school colors	UST school colors
UST	La Salle school colors	FEU school colors	NU school colors	Adamson school colors	UP school colors	Ateneo school colors	UE school colors	Adamson school colors	UE school colors	La Salle school colors	Ateneo school colors	FEU school colors	NU school colors	UP school colors

Source: UAAP on Facebook
= Win; = Loss

==== Game results ====
Results on top and to the right of the solid cells are for first-round games; those to the bottom and left are for second-round games.

Teams	AdU	AdMU	DLSU	FEU	NU	UE	UP	UST
Adamson Soaring Falcons		0–3	0–3	1–3	0–3	0–3	3–0	2–3
Ateneo Blue Eagles	3–2		0–3	1–3	0–3	3–2	3–0	1–3
De La Salle Green Spikers	3–0	2–3		1–3	0–3	3–1	3–0	1–3
FEU Tamaraws	3–0	2–3	2–3		0–3	3–1	3–0	2–3
NU Bulldogs	3–0	3–1	3–0	3–1		3–2	3–2	3–1
UE Red Warriors	3–2	1–3	1–3	3–2	0–3		3–1	0–3
UP Fighting Maroons	2–3	3–2	0–3	0–3	1–3	0–3		0–3
UST Golden Spikers	3–0	3–0	3–1	2–3	1–3	3–1	3–1	

Source: UAAP on Facebook
Legend: Blue = left column team win; Red = top row team win.

=== Bracket ===
Stepladder round 1 (Single elimination)
3	FEU	3
4	La Salle	1

Stepladder round 2 (Single elimination)
2	UST	3
3	FEU	0

Finals (Best-of-three series)
1	NU	3	3
2	UST	2	0

=== Stepladder semifinals ===
==== First round ====
This is a single elimination game. The last time FEU and La Salle faced each other in the semifinals was in season 75. It is also La Salle's first semifinals appearance after 10 years.

May 3, 2023; 11:00 AM (UTC+8:00)	FEU Tamaraws	3–1	De La Salle Green Spikers	Araneta Coliseum, Quezon City; Attendance: 650; Referees: Choi Buquid (NR) & Jason Altarejos (NR)
May 3, 2023; 11:00 AM (UTC+8:00)	(25–21, 19–25, 25–22, 25–22); P2			Araneta Coliseum, Quezon City; Attendance: 650; Referees: Choi Buquid (NR) & Jason Altarejos (NR)
May 3, 2023; 11:00 AM (UTC+8:00)	FEU advances to the second round			Araneta Coliseum, Quezon City; Attendance: 650; Referees: Choi Buquid (NR) & Jason Altarejos (NR)

==== Second round ====
This is a single elimination game. UST is back in the semifinals after missing out in season 81. The last time UST and FEU faced each other in the semifinals was on 2017.

May 7, 2023; 2:00 PM (UTC+8:00)	UST Golden Spikers	3–0	FEU Tamaraws	Araneta Coliseum, Quezon City; Attendance: 8,000; Referees: Emmanuel Yadao (NR) & Philip Nunez (NR)
May 7, 2023; 2:00 PM (UTC+8:00)	(25–18, 25–22, 25–21); P2			Araneta Coliseum, Quezon City; Attendance: 8,000; Referees: Emmanuel Yadao (NR) & Philip Nunez (NR)
May 7, 2023; 2:00 PM (UTC+8:00)	UST advances to the finals			Araneta Coliseum, Quezon City; Attendance: 8,000; Referees: Emmanuel Yadao (NR) & Philip Nunez (NR)

=== Finals ===
NU would have best-of-three series against UST.

May 10, 2023; 2:00 PM (UTC+8:00)	NU Bulldogs	3–2	UST Golden Spikers	SM Mall of Asia Arena, Pasay City; Attendance: 1,128; Referees: Choi Buquid (NR) & Ely De Jesus (NR)
May 10, 2023; 2:00 PM (UTC+8:00)	(25–23, 25–22, 21–25, 29–31, 15–11); P2			SM Mall of Asia Arena, Pasay City; Attendance: 1,128; Referees: Choi Buquid (NR) & Ely De Jesus (NR)

May 14, 2023; 2:00 PM (UTC+8:00)	NU Bulldogs	3–0	UST Golden Spikers	SM Mall of Asia Arena, Pasay City; Referees: Ely De Jesus (NR) & Philip Nuñez (NR)
May 14, 2023; 2:00 PM (UTC+8:00)	(25–20, 25–21, 25–20); P2			SM Mall of Asia Arena, Pasay City; Referees: Ely De Jesus (NR) & Philip Nuñez (NR)
May 14, 2023; 2:00 PM (UTC+8:00)	NU wins series, 2-0			SM Mall of Asia Arena, Pasay City; Referees: Ely De Jesus (NR) & Philip Nuñez (NR)

- Finals Most Valuable Player: Ave Joshua Retamar (NU Bulldogs)

=== Awards ===
UAAP Season 85 men's volleyball champions
NU Bulldogs
Fifth title, third consecutive title

The awards were handed out prior to Game 2 of the Finals at the SM Mall of Asia Arena.

- Most Valuable Player: Josh Ybañez (UST Golden Spikers)
- Rookie of the Year: Josh Ybañez (UST Golden Spikers)
- 1st Best Outside Spiker: Josh Ybañez (UST Golden Spikers)
- 2nd Best Outside Spiker: Michaelo Buddin (NU Bulldogs)
- 1st Best Middle Blocker: Obed Mukaba (NU Bulldogs)
- 2nd Best Middle Blocker: Billie Jean-Henri Anima (De La Salle Green Spikers)
- Best Opposite Spiker: Jay Rack Dela Noche (UST Golden Spikers)
- Best Setter: Ave Joshua Retamar (NU Bulldogs)
- Best Libero: Lance Andrei De Castro (Ateneo Blue Eagles)

==== Players of the Week ====
The Collegiate Press Corps awards a "player of the week" for performances on the preceding week.

Week	Player	Team
Week 3	Josh Ybañez	UST Golden Spikers
Week 8	Joshua Retamar	NU Bulldogs

== Women's tournament ==
=== Team line-up ===
Adamson Lady Falcons
No.	Name	Position
2	LAZO, Cae Jelean	L
3	MARCE, Aliah	OH
4	ALCANTARA, Angelica	S
6	NUIQUE, May Ann	MB
7	ROMERO, Louie (c)	S
8	ADOLFO, Antonette	OH
9	SANTIAGO, Kate Nhorrylle	OH
10	VERDEFLOR, Maria Joahna Karen	L
11	CRUZ, Rizza Andrea	MB
12	TUBU, Trisha Gayle	OP
13	TAGSIP, Aprylle Ckyle	MB
15	JUEGOS, Ayesha Tara	OP
17	ALMONTE, Lucille May	OH
18	TORING, Lorene Grace	MB
	YEE, Jerry	HC

Ateneo Blue Eagles
No.	Name	Position
4	LICAUCO, Jean Arianne May	L
5	GANDLER, Vanessa	OH
7	CRUZ, Kiara Cyrene	L
8	SULIT, Yvana Avik	MB
9	FUJIMOTO, Takako	S
11	TSUNASHIMA, Geezel May	OH
12	NARIT, Joan Decemary	MB
14	MINER, Alexis Ciarra	MB
16	DE GUZMAN, Lyann Marie Loise	OH
17	NISPEROS, Faith Janine Shirley (c)	OP
18	LOMOCSO, Beutiliza	S
19	DOROMAL, Roma Mae	L
21	BUENA, Sophia Beatriz	OH
24	NISPEROS, Faye Sophia Ysabelle	OH
	ALMADRO, Oliver Allan	HC

De La Salle Lady Spikers
No.	Name	Position
2	SHARMA, Mereophe Aevangeline	MB
3	GAGATE, Thea Allison	MB
4	CRUZ, Leila Jane	OP
5	JAZARENO, Ylizyeth Justine	L
6	MALALUAN, Alleiah Jan	OH
7	LAPUT, Shevana Maria Nicola	OP
8	DELA CRUZ, Jolina	OH
9	CORONEL, Julia Cyrille	S
10	LARROZA, Princess Maicah	OH
11	ALBA, Marionne Angelique (c)	S
12	CANINO, Angel Anne	OH
15	PROVIDO, Amie	MB
16	SOREÑO, Baby Jyne	OP
20	DE LEON, Lyka May	L
	DE JESUS, Ramil	HC

FEU Lady Tamaraws
No.	Name	Position
2	KISEO, Shiela Mae (c)	OH
4	FERNANDEZ, Jovelyn	OP
5	UBALDO, Christine	S
6	JUANGCO, Alexandra Maxine	L
7	ASIS, Ann Roselle	MB
8	PANANGIN, Mitzi	MB
9	TAGAOD, Chenie	OH
11	GALLO, Gillianne Heinz	S
13	DEVOSORA, Alyzza Gaile	OH
15	PETALLO, Gerzel Mary	OH
16	TRUZ, Karyme Isabella	MB
17	ENCARNACION, Margarett Louise	L
19	ASIS, Jean	MB
20	MONARES, Julianne	OH
	SALAK, Cristina	HC

NU Lady Bulldogs
No.	Name	Position
4	BELEN, Michaela	OH
6	ALINSUG, Evangeline	OH
7	ROBLES, Princess Anne (c)	OH
8	TORING, Sheena Angela	MB
9	NIERVA, Jennifer	L
10	MATA, Alexa Nichole	MB
12	SOLOMON, Alyssa Jae	OP
13	LAMINA, Camilla Victoria	S
14	PANGILINAN, Erin May	MB
15	ELLARINA, Jazlyne Anne	OP
16	JARDIO, Shaira May	L
17	MAAYA, Minierva	MB
18	CAGANDE, Joyme	S
21	ESCANLAR, Myrtle	OH
	DIMACULANGAN, Ray Karl	HC

UE Lady Red Warriors
No.	Name	Position
2	LANA, Janeca Janine (c)	OH
3	TEQUIN, Shainely	MB
5	NIEVA, Percae Darabella	OH
6	BABOL, Jasckin May	L
7	PELAGA, Lia Alexa	MB
10	QUIZON, Jhudielle	S
11	ZETA, Jenina Marie	L
12	BANGAYAN, Vanessa Karzai	OH
13	BALINGIT, Kayce	OH
14	DIONISIO, Kamille	MB
16	MANALO, Rhea	OH
17	CEPADA, KC	OP
19	NOGALES, Riza	MB
20	REYES, Angelica	L
	DIMACULANGAN, Ronwald Kris	HC

UP Fighting Maroons
No.	Name	Position
1	SOTOMIL, Marianne	S
3	YTANG, Niña	MB
4	ALTOMEA, Remelyn	L
6	ARCE, Ethan Lainne	MB
7	CELIS, Maria Dannica	MB
8	OJEDA, Kirstin Louise	
9	BONAFE, Theo Bea	S
10	BERTOLANO, Alyssa	OP
11	ESLAPOR, Euricka	OH
12	ENCARNACION, Jewel Hannah Ysabelle (c)	OH
14	GOC, Abilaine Ann	OH
16	BUSTRILLO, Stephanie	OP
17	GAYO, Jum Marie	L
21	CABASAC, Kyrzten Annikha	
	DELOS SANTOS, Ceseal	HC

UST Golden Tigresses
No.	Name	Position
1	PEÑAFIEL, Renee Lou	OH
4	PEPITO, Maria Bernadett	L
5	HERNANDEZ, Imee Kim Gabriella	MB
6	ALESSANDRINI, Milena	OH
8	LAURE, Ejiya (c)	OH
10	GULA, Xyza Rufel	OH/L
11	ABBU, Athena Sophia	MB
12	GALDONES, Kecelyn	MB
13	PERDIDO, Jonna Chris	OP
14	ABELLANA, Pierre Angeli	OH
16	MANGULABNAN, Maria Regina Agatha	S
18	TORRES, Janna Elizabeth	MB
20	JURADO, Regina Grace	OP
24	CARBALLO, Maria Cassandra Rae	S
	REYES, Emilio Jr.	HC

Legend
S	Setter
MB	Middle Blocker
OH	Outside Hitter
OP	Opposite Hitter
L	Libero
(c)	Team Captain
HC	Head coach

=== Elimination round ===
==== Team standings ====
Pos	Team	Pld	W	L	Pts	SW	SL	SR	SPW	SPL	SPR	Qualification
1	De La Salle Lady Spikers	14	13	1	37	40	8	5.000	1141	899	1.269	Twice-to-beat in the semifinals
2	NU Lady Bulldogs	14	11	3	32	35	15	2.333	1158	958	1.209	Twice-to-beat in the semifinals
3	Adamson Lady Falcons (H)	14	10	4	32	35	17	2.059	1199	1079	1.111	Twice-to-win in the semifinals
4	UST Golden Tigresses	14	10	4	29	34	20	1.700	1209	1119	1.080	Twice-to-win in the semifinals
5	FEU Lady Tamaraws	14	6	8	16	21	31	0.677	1113	1164	0.956	
6	Ateneo Blue Eagles	14	4	10	14	18	32	0.563	1043	1142	0.913	
7	UP Fighting Maroons	14	1	13	5	10	40	0.250	989	1183	0.836	
8	UE Lady Red Warriors	14	1	13	3	11	41	0.268	942	1250	0.754	

Source: UAAP on Twitter
Rules for classification: 1) number of wins; 2) if tied for No. 2 or 4, one-game playoff; 3) match points; 4) sets ratio; 5) points ratio; 6) head-to-head record
(H) Host

==== Match-up results ====
	Round 1							Round 2						
Team ╲ Game	1	2	3	4	5	6	7	8	9	10	11	12	13	14
Adamson	UE school colors	NU school colors	FEU school colors	UST school colors	Ateneo school colors	La Salle school colors	UP school colors	UST school colors	Ateneo school colors	NU school colors	UE school colors	La Salle school colors	UP school colors	FEU school colors
Ateneo	NU school colors	UE school colors	La Salle school colors	FEU school colors	Adamson school colors	UST school colors	UP school colors	UE school colors	Adamson school colors	UP school colors	UST school colors	FEU school colors	La Salle school colors	NU school colors
La Salle	UST school colors	UP school colors	Ateneo school colors	UE school colors	FEU school colors	Adamson school colors	NU school colors	NU school colors	FEU school colors	UST school colors	UP school colors	Adamson school colors	Ateneo school colors	UE school colors
FEU	UP school colors	UST school colors	Adamson school colors	Ateneo school colors	La Salle school colors	UE school colors	NU school colors	UP school colors	La Salle school colors	UE school colors	NU school colors	Ateneo school colors	UST school colors	Adamson school colors
NU	Ateneo school colors	Adamson school colors	UST school colors	UP school colors	UE school colors	FEU school colors	La Salle school colors	La Salle school colors	UP school colors	Adamson school colors	FEU school colors	UE school colors	UST school colors	Ateneo school colors
UE	Adamson school colors	Ateneo school colors	UP school colors	La Salle school colors	NU school colors	FEU school colors	UST school colors	Ateneo school colors	UST school colors	FEU school colors	Adamson school colors	NU school colors	UP school colors	La Salle school colors
UP	FEU school colors	La Salle school colors	UE school colors	NU school colors	UST school colors	Ateneo school colors	Adamson school colors	FEU school colors	NU school colors	Ateneo school colors	La Salle school colors	Adamson school colors	UE school colors	UST school colors
UST	La Salle school colors	FEU school colors	NU school colors	Adamson school colors	UP school colors	Ateneo school colors	UE school colors	Adamson school colors	UE school colors	La Salle school colors	Ateneo school colors	FEU school colors	NU school colors	UP school colors

Source: UAAP on Facebook
= Win; = Loss

==== Game results ====
Results on top and to the right of the solid cells are for first-round games; those to the bottom and left are for second-round games.

Teams	AdU	AdMU	DLSU	FEU	NU	UE	UP	UST
Adamson Lady Falcons		3–0	1–3	3–1	2–3	3–0	3–0	3–0
Ateneo Blue Eagles	0–3		0–3	2–3	0–3	3–1	3–0	0–3
De La Salle Lady Spikers	3–2	3–0		3–0	3–0	3–0	3–0	3–2
FEU Lady Tamaraws	1–3	3–1	0–3		0–3	3–2	3–1	0–3
NU Lady Bulldogs	3–0	3–2	0–3	3–0		3–0	3–1	2–3
UE Lady Red Warriors	1–3	1–3	0–3	1–3	0–3		1–3	1–3
UP Fighting Maroons	1–3	0–3	0–3	0–3	0–3	2–3		0–3
UST Golden Tigresses	1–3	3–1	3–1	3–1	1–3	3–0	3–2	

Source: UAAP on Facebook
Legend: Blue = left column team win; Red = top row team win.

=== Bracket ===
Semifinals (Nos. 1 & 2 have twice-to-beat advantage)
1	La Salle	3
4	UST	1
2	NU	3
3	Adamson	1

Finals (Best-of-three series)
1	La Salle	3	3
2	NU	2	2

=== Semifinals ===
The top two seeds in the semifinals have the twice-to-beat advantage.

==== La Salle vs UST ====
La Salle has the twice-to-beat advantage.

May 3, 2023; 1:00 PM (UTC+8:00)	De La Salle Lady Spikers	3–1	UST Golden Tigresses	Araneta Coliseum, Quezon City; Attendance: 17,200; Referees: Romulo Refosrsado (NR) & Ronaldo Lumagbas (NR)
May 3, 2023; 1:00 PM (UTC+8:00)	(26–24, 25–22, 20–25, 25–19); P2			Araneta Coliseum, Quezon City; Attendance: 17,200; Referees: Romulo Refosrsado (NR) & Ronaldo Lumagbas (NR)
May 3, 2023; 1:00 PM (UTC+8:00)	La Salle wins series in one game			Araneta Coliseum, Quezon City; Attendance: 17,200; Referees: Romulo Refosrsado (NR) & Ronaldo Lumagbas (NR)

==== NU vs Adamson ====
NU has the twice-to-beat advantage.

May 3, 2023; 3:00 PM (UTC+8:00)	NU Lady Bulldogs	3–1	Adamson Lady Falcons	Araneta Coliseum, Quezon City; Attendance: 8,014; Referees: Ely De Jesus (NR) & Antonio Espartero (NR)
May 3, 2023; 3:00 PM (UTC+8:00)	(22–25, 25–22, 25–12, 25–15); P2			Araneta Coliseum, Quezon City; Attendance: 8,014; Referees: Ely De Jesus (NR) & Antonio Espartero (NR)
May 3, 2023; 3:00 PM (UTC+8:00)	NU wins series in one game			Araneta Coliseum, Quezon City; Attendance: 8,014; Referees: Ely De Jesus (NR) & Antonio Espartero (NR)

=== Finals ===
The finals is a best-of-three series.

May 7, 2023; 4:00 PM (UTC+8:00)	De La Salle Lady Spikers	3–2	NU Lady Bulldogs	Araneta Coliseum, Quezon City; Attendance: 10,995; Referees: Spinks Cabusa (NR) & Antonio Espartero (NR)
May 7, 2023; 4:00 PM (UTC+8:00)	(18–25, 25–22, 22–25, 25–21, 15–13); P2			Araneta Coliseum, Quezon City; Attendance: 10,995; Referees: Spinks Cabusa (NR) & Antonio Espartero (NR)

May 14, 2023; 4:00 PM (UTC+8:00)	De La Salle Lady Spikers	3–2	NU Lady Bulldogs	SM Mall of Asia Arena, Pasay City; Attendance: 20,514; Referees: Jason Altarejos (NR) & Erwin Cordero (NR)
May 14, 2023; 4:00 PM (UTC+8:00)	(19–25, 23–25, 25–15, 25–17, 15–10); P2			SM Mall of Asia Arena, Pasay City; Attendance: 20,514; Referees: Jason Altarejos (NR) & Erwin Cordero (NR)
May 14, 2023; 4:00 PM (UTC+8:00)	La Salle wins series, 2–0			SM Mall of Asia Arena, Pasay City; Attendance: 20,514; Referees: Jason Altarejos (NR) & Erwin Cordero (NR)

- Finals Most Valuable Player: Marionne Angelique Alba (De La Salle Lady Spikers)

=== Awards ===
UAAP Season 85 women's volleyball champions
De La Salle Lady Archers
12th title

The awards were handed out prior to Game 2 of the Finals at the SM Mall of Asia Arena.

- Most Valuable Player: Angel Anne Canino (De La Salle Lady Spikers)
- Rookie of the Year: Angel Anne Canino (De La Salle Lady Spikers)
- 1st Best Outside Spiker: Jolina Dela Cruz (De La Salle Lady Spikers)
- 2nd Best Outside Spiker: Angel Anne Canino (De La Salle Lady Spikers)
- 1st Best Middle Blocker: Thea Allison Gagate (De La Salle Lady Spikers)
- 2nd Best Middle Blocker: Niña Ytang (UP Fighting Maroons)
- Best Opposite Spiker: Jovelyn Fernandez (FEU Lady Tamaraws)
- Best Setter: Marionne Angelique Alba (De La Salle Lady Spikers)
- Best Libero: Ma. Bernadett Pepito (UST Golden Tigresses)

==== Players of the Week ====
The Collegiate Press Corps awards a "player of the week" for performances on the preceding week.

Week	Player	Team
Week 1	Angel Canino	De La Salle Lady Spikers
Week 2	Trisha Tubu	Adamson Lady Falcons
Week 4	Jolina Dela Cruz	De La Salle Lady Spikers
Week 5	Eya Laure	UST Golden Tigresses
Week 6	Imee Hernandez	UST Golden Tigresses
Week 7	Shevana Laput	De La Salle Lady Spikers

== Boys' tournament ==
=== Team line-up ===
Adamson Baby Falcons
No.	Name	Position
1		
2		
3		
4		
5		
6		
7		
8		
9		
10		
11		
12		
13		
14		
	HC	

Ateneo Blue Eagles
No.	Name	Position
1		
2		
3		
4		
5		
6		
7		
8		
9		
10		
11		
12		
13		
14		
	HC	

Zobel Junior Archers
No.	Name	Position
1		
2		
3		
4		
5		
6		
7		
8		
9		
10		
11		
12		
13		
14		
	HC	

FEU–D Baby Tamaraws
No.	Name	Position
1		
2		
3		
4		
5		
6		
7		
8		
9		
10		
11		
12		
13		
14		
	HC	

NUNS Bullpups
No.	Name	Position
1		
2		
3		
4		
5		
6		
7		
8		
9		
10		
11		
12		
13		
14		
	HC	

UE Junior Red Warriors
No.	Name	Position
1		
2		
3		
4		
5		
6		
7		
8		
9		
10		
11		
12		
13		
14		
GUHIT, Jerome	HC	

UST Tiger Cubs
No.	Name	Position
1		
2		
3		
4		
5		
6		
7		
8		
9		
10		
11		
12		
13		
14		
MAMON, Arthur Odjie	HC	

Legend
S	Setter
MB	Middle Blocker
OH	Outside Hitter
OP	Opposite Hitter
L	Libero
(c)	Team Captain
HC	Head coach

=== Elimination round ===
==== Team standings ====
Pos	Team	Pld	W	L	Pts	SW	SL	SR	SPW	SPL	SPR	Qualification
1	NUNS Bullpups	12	10	2	30	32	9	3.556	913	664	1.375	Twice-to-beat in the semifinals
2	FEU–D Baby Tamaraws	12	10	2	28	33	16	2.063	1007	816	1.234	Twice-to-beat in the semifinals
3	UE Junior Red Warriors (H)	12	8	4	25	28	15	1.867	911	807	1.129	Twice-to-win in the semifinals
4	UST Tiger Cubs	12	8	4	23	26	15	1.733	899	713	1.261	Twice-to-win in the semifinals
5	Adamson Baby Falcons	12	4	8	14	19	24	0.792	823	730	1.127	
6	Ateneo Blue Eagles	12	2	10	6	6	30	0.200	494	860	0.574	
7	Zobel Junior Archers	12	0	12	0	0	36	0.000	406	900	0.451	

Rules for classification: 1) number of wins; 2) if tied for No. 2 or 4, one-game playoff; 3) match points; 4) sets ratio; 5) points ratio; 6) head-to-head record
(H) Host

==== Match-up results ====
	Round 1						Round 2					
Team ╲ Game	1	2	3	4	5	6	7	8	9	10	11	12
Adamson	UST school colors	La Salle school colors	NU school colors	UE school colors	Ateneo school colors	FEU school colors	UST school colors	Ateneo school colors	UE school colors	NU school colors	La Salle school colors	FEU school colors
Ateneo	FEU school colors	UST school colors	La Salle school colors	NU school colors	UE school colors	Adamson school colors	NU school colors	Adamson school colors	La Salle school colors	FEU school colors	UST school colors	UE school colors
DLSZ	UE school colors	Adamson school colors	Ateneo school colors	FEU school colors	UST school colors	NU school colors	FEU school colors	UST school colors	Ateneo school colors	UE school colors	NU school colors	Adamson school colors
FEU–D	Ateneo school colors	UST school colors	La Salle school colors	NU school colors	UE school colors	Adamson school colors	La Salle school colors	UST school colors	Ateneo school colors	UE school colors	NU school colors	Adamson school colors
NSNU	UE school colors	Adamson school colors	Ateneo school colors	FEU school colors	UST school colors	La Salle school colors	Ateneo school colors	UE school colors	Adamson school colors	La Salle school colors	FEU school colors	UST school colors
UE	La Salle school colors	NU school colors	Adamson school colors	Ateneo school colors	FEU school colors	UST school colors	NU school colors	Adamson school colors	La Salle school colors	FEU school colors	UST school colors	Ateneo school colors
UST	Adamson school colors	Ateneo school colors	FEU school colors	La Salle school colors	NU school colors	UE school colors	Adamson school colors	La Salle school colors	FEU school colors	Ateneo school colors	UE school colors	NU school colors

= Win; = Loss

==== Game results ====
Results on top and to the right of the solid cells are for first-round games; those to the bottom and to the left of it are second-round games.

Teams	AdU	AdMU	DLSZ	FEU-D	NSNU	UE	UST
Adamson Baby Falcons		3–0	3–0	1–3	0–3	1–3	0–3
Ateneo Blue Eagles	0–3		3–0	0–3	0–3	0–3	0–3
Zobel Junior Archers	0–3	0–3		0–3	0–3	0–3	0–3
FEU–D Baby Tamaraws	3–0	3–0	3–0		2–3	3–2	3–1
NUNS Bullpups	3–0	3–0	3–0	3–1		0–3	2–3
UE Junior Red Warriors	3–2	3–0	3–0	2–3	0–3		3–0
UST Tiger Cubs	3–1	3–0	0–3	1–3	0–3	3–0	

Legend: Blue = left column team win; Red = top row team win.

=== Bracket ===
Semifinals (Nos. 1 & 2 have twice-to-beat advantage)
1	NSNU	3
4	UST	1
2	FEU–D	3
3	UE	1

Final (Best-of-three series)
1	NSNU	3	2	0
2	FEU–D	2	3	3

=== Semifinals ===
NSNU and FEU-D have the twice-to-beat advantage. They only need to win once while their opponents twice in order to qualify in the Finals.

==== NSNU vs. UST ====
March 16; 10:30 AM	NUNS Bullpups	3–1	UST Tiger Cubs	Paco Arena, Manila
March 16; 10:30 AM	(25–14, 25–18, 21–25, 25–15)			Paco Arena, Manila
March 16; 10:30 AM	NSNU wins series in one game			Paco Arena, Manila

==== FEU-D vs. UE ====
March 16; 12:00 PM	FEU–D Baby Tamaraws	3–1	UE Junior Red Warriors	Paco Arena, Manila
March 16; 12:00 PM	(25–20, 25–27, 25–20, 25–19)			Paco Arena, Manila
March 16; 12:00 PM	FEU-D wins series in one game			Paco Arena, Manila

=== Finals ===
The finals is a best-of-three playoff.

March 18; 10:30 AM	NUNS Bullpups	3–2	FEU–D Baby Tamaraws	Paco Arena, Manila
March 18; 10:30 AM	(25–22, 14–25, 15–25, 25–22, 15–13)			Paco Arena, Manila

March 20; 9:00 AM	NUNS Bullpups	2–3	FEU–D Baby Tamaraws	Paco Arena, Manila
March 20; 9:00 AM	(25–23, 22–25, 14–25, 25–19, 13–15)			Paco Arena, Manila

March 21; 9:00 AM	NUNS Bullpups	0–3	FEU–D Baby Tamaraws	Paco Arena, Manila
March 21; 9:00 AM	(13–25, 13–25, 17–25)			Paco Arena, Manila
March 21; 9:00 AM	FEU-D wins series, 2–1			Paco Arena, Manila

- Finals Most Valuable Player: Rhodson Du-ot (FEU–D Baby Tamaraws)

=== Awards ===
UAAP Season 85 boys' volleyball champions
FEU–D Baby Tamaraws
First title

The awards were handed out prior to Game 2 of the Finals at the Paco Arena.

- Most Valuable Player: Eugenio Gloria (NUNS Bullpups)
- Rookie of the Year: Herbert Egger (NUNS Bullpups)
- 1st Best Outside Spiker: Andrei Delicana (FEU–D Baby Tamaraws)
- 2nd Best Outside Spiker: Jan Julian Macam (UE Junior Red Warriors)
- 1st Best Middle Blocker: Herbert Egger (NUNS Bullpups)
- 2nd Best Middle Blocker: Patrick Lardizabal (UST Tiger Cubs)
- Best Opposite Spiker: Amet Bituin (FEU–D Baby Tamaraws)
- Best Setter: Jeffe Gallego Jr. (NUNS Bullpups)
- Best Libero: Edriel Alabar (FEU–D Baby Tamaraws)

== Girls' tournament ==
=== Team line-up ===
Adamson Lady Baby Falcons
No.	Name	Position
2	ROJO, Yesha	MB
3	NITURA, Shaina (c)	OH
4	ALJIBE, Eloi	MB
6	BASCON, Red	OH
7	CUENCA, Jao	S
10	BADION, Sophia	MB
11	PINEDA, Maegan	L
12	MANUEL, Juris	L
13	LALONGISIP, Reian	OH
14	SAGAYSAY, Fhei	S
15	SADIA, Karla	OH
16	ESTRADA, Mishka	OP
17	INOCENTES, Fionna	MB
19	APOSAGA, Thea	OP
	YUDE, JP	HC

Zobel Junior Lady Archers
No.	Name	Position
1	DELOS SANTOS, Elina	L
2	MINDANAO, Juliene	MB
4	TRIA, Kat	OH
5	ALEMAÑA, Aislinn	OH
6	PIÑOSA, Annika	L
8	VALDEZ, Sabine	S
9	GAMBOA, Lorien (c)	OH
11	ALMUETE, Joelle Denise	OP
12	ZULUETA, Charlene	OH
13	MARZAN, Sam	OH
14	LIMPOT, Zofi	S
17	ANDRES, Julia	MB
18	CORTEZ, Riane	OP
19	GAMBOA, Cassandra	MB
	MONREAL, Jeremiah	HC

FEU–D Lady Baby Tamaraws
No.	Name	Position
1	LOPEZ, Love	OH
2	ALONZO, Raine	OP
5	ARCIAGA, Pat	MB
6	PENDON, Kyle	OH
7	ALIMEN, Jing	OH
8	TUMAYAO, Princess	S
9	PASCUAL, Sheila	OH
10	LORESCO, Clarisse	MB
12	ARROYO, Fiona	L
14	SUPLICO, Karylle	L
15	PREMAYLON, Chie	OP
16	CABALLERO, Kieralyn	MB
18	MALUTO, Bea (c)	MB
25	RAMOS, CD	S
	DEL ROSARIO, RJay	HC

NUNS Lady Bullpups
No.	Name	Position
1	GUINTO, Amor	OH
3	PONO, Abegail (c)	S
4	NOCEJA, Yesha	OH
5	BUHAY, Janessa	OH
6	OLANGO, Kianne	OP
7	ALBERTO, Hilalhia	MB
8	SERNECHE, Lot	OP
9	CEPADA, IC	L
11	SILLA, Robielle	MB
13	MIRANDA, Karyll	S
14	BANSIL, Bienne	MB
15	VALDEZ	L
16	MORALES	OP
19	MARSH, Celine	OH
	PONCE-DE LEON, Vilet	HC

UP Junior Fighting Maroons
No.	Name	Position
1	LOPEZ, Bea	OH
4	DELA ROSA, Lizzie (c)	L
5	DELA CRUZ, Kina	MB
8	DE LEON, Julia	S
10	GUARINO, Janella	MB
11	LEGUIAB, Trizia	OP
12	LEAÑO, Mira	OH
14	HERNANDEZ, Keira	S
16	LONG, Khloe	OH
20	JACKSON, Angela	OP
	FIEL, Andy	HC

UST Junior Tigresses
No.	Name	Position
2	POYOS, Angeline	OH
3	ADRAO, Jai	MB
4	LOZADA, Elijah	OH
5	LIPAT, Qeria	MB
6	BANAGUA, Em	MB
7	GOULD, Jenn	OH
8	ALTEA, Marga (c)	MB
9	CHUA, Ysa	OP
10	ARASAN, Bien	OH
11	VALIMENTO, Kristina	OP
12	BARADAS, Ashley	S
13	ESCOBER, Pau	L
15	MAGNAYI, Ashley	S
17	ENVERGA, Marbey	L
	REYES, Kungfu	HC

Legend
S	Setter
MB	Middle Blocker
OH	Outside Hitter
OP	Opposite Hitter
L	Libero
(c)	Team Captain
HC	Head coach

=== Elimination round ===
==== Team standings ====
Pos	Team	Pld	W	L	Pts	SW	SL	SR	SPW	SPL	SPR	Qualification
1	NUNS Lady Bullpups	10	10	0	29	30	5	6.000	818	587	1.394	Qualified to the Finals
2	Adamson Lady Baby Falcons	10	7	3	21	25	11	2.273	646	555	1.164	Qualified to the Finals
3	FEU–D Lady Baby Tamaraws	10	6	4	17	19	15	1.267	703	635	1.107	
4	UST Junior Tigresses	10	5	5	17	20	16	1.250	804	699	1.150	
5	UPIS Junior Fighting Maroons	10	1	9	3	4	27	0.148	621	835	0.744	
6	Zobel Junior Lady Archers	10	1	9	3	3	28	0.107	406	759	0.535	

Rules for classification: 1) number of wins; 2) if tied for No. 2, one-game playoff; 3) match points; 4) sets ratio; 5) points ratio; 6) head-to-head record

==== Match-up results ====
	Round 1					Round 2				
Team ╲ Game	1	2	3	4	5	6	7	8	9	10
Adamson	FEU school colors	UST school colors	UP school colors	La Salle school colors	NU school colors	La Salle school colors	FEU school colors	UP school colors	UST school colors	NU school colors
DLSZ	UST school colors	UP school colors	NU school colors	Adamson school colors	FEU school colors	Adamson school colors	NU school colors	FEU school colors	UP school colors	UST school colors
FEU–D	Adamson school colors	NU school colors	UST school colors	UP school colors	La Salle school colors	UST school colors	Adamson school colors	La Salle school colors	NU school colors	UP school colors
NSNU	UP school colors	FEU school colors	La Salle school colors	UST school colors	Adamson school colors	UP school colors	La Salle school colors	UST school colors	FEU school colors	Adamson school colors
UP	NU school colors	La Salle school colors	Adamson school colors	FEU school colors	UST school colors	NU school colors	UST school colors	Adamson school colors	La Salle school colors	FEU school colors
UST	La Salle school colors	Adamson school colors	FEU school colors	NU school colors	UP school colors	FEU school colors	UP school colors	NU school colors	Adamson school colors	La Salle school colors

= Win; = Loss

==== Game results ====
Results on top and to the right of the solid cells are for first-round games; those to the bottom and to the left of it are second-round games.

Teams	AdU	DLSZ	FEU-D	NSNU	UPIS	UST
Adamson Lady Baby Falcons		3–0	3–0	1–3	3–0	3–2
Zobel Junior Lady Archers	0–3		0–3	0–3	3–1	0–3
FEU–D Lady Baby Tamaraws	0–3	3–0		1–3	3–0	3–1
NUNS Lady Bullpups	3–2	3–0	3–0		3–0	3–0
UPIS Junior Fighting Maroons	0–3	3–0	0–3	0–3		0–3
UST Junior Tigresses	3–1	3–0	2–3	0–3	3–0	

Legend: Blue = left column team win; Red = top row team win.

=== Finals ===
The finals is a best-of-three playoff.

March 16; 9:00 AM	NUNS Lady Bullpups	3–2	Adamson Lady Baby Falcons	Paco Arena, Manila
March 16; 9:00 AM	(20–25, 25–16, 26–28, 25–16, 15–11)			Paco Arena, Manila

March 18; 9:00 AM	NUNS Lady Bullpups	2–3	Adamson Lady Baby Falcons	Paco Arena, Manila
March 18; 9:00 AM	(25–21, 20–25, 25–20, 21–25, 13–15)			Paco Arena, Manila

March 20; 11:00 AM	NUNS Lady Bullpups	3–0	Adamson Lady Baby Falcons	Paco Arena, Manila
March 20; 11:00 AM	(26–24, 25–17, 29–27)			Paco Arena, Manila
March 20; 11:00 AM	NSNU wins series, 2–1			Paco Arena, Manila

- Finals Most Valuable Player: Abegail Pono (NUNS Lady Bullpups)

=== Awards ===
UAAP Season 85 girls' volleyball champions
NUNS Lady Bullpups
Sixth title, second consecutive title

The awards were handed out prior to Game 2 of the Finals at the Paco Arena.

- Most valuable player: Kianne Olango (NUNS Lady Bullpups)
- Rookie of the Year: Janessa Buhay (NUNS Lady Bullpups)
- 1st Best Outside Spiker: Shaina Nitura (Adamson Lady Baby Falcons)
- 2nd Best Outside Spiker: Celine Marsh (NUNS Lady Bullpups)
- 1st Best Middle Blocker: Clarisse Loresco (FEU–D Lady Baby Tamaraws)
- 2nd Best Middle Blocker: Marga Altea (UST Junior Tigresses)
- Best Opposite Spiker: Kianne Olango (NUNS Lady Bullpups)
- Best Setter: Abegail Pono (NUNS Lady Bullpups)
- Best Libero: Juris Manuel (Adamson Lady Baby Falcons)

== See also ==
- NCAA Season 98 volleyball tournaments

Preceded by Season 84 (2022)	UAAP volleyball tournaments Season 85 (2023)	Succeeded by Season 86 (2023–24)
