= Mars Alba =

Filipino volleyball player

Marionne Alba
Personal information
- Full name: Marionne Angelique Alba
- Nickname: Mars
- Nationality: Filipino
- Born: August 26, 1999 (age 27) Marikina, Philippines
- Education: De La Salle University
- Height: 1.68 m (5 ft 6 in)

Volleyball information
- Position: Setter
- Current club: Akari Chargers
- Number: 19

Career
- Years: Team
- 2023: F2 Logistics Cargo Movers
- 2024: Choco Mucho Flying Titans
- 2025–present: Akari Chargers

National team
- Years: Team
- 2025–present: Philippines
Honours
Women's volleyball
Representing Philippines
SEA V.League
Bronze medal – third place	2025 Nakhon Ratchasima	Leg 1
Bronze medal – third place	2025 Ninh Bình	Leg 2

Marionne Angelique Alba (born August 26, 1999) is a Filipino volleyball player. She is currently playing as a setter for the Akari Chargers in the Premier Volleyball League.

== Career ==
=== College ===
Alba played for the Lady Spikers of the De La Salle University in the University Athletic Association of the Philippines (UAAP).

She played her last playing year in the UAAP in Season 85, where they bagged the championship title against NU Lady Bulldogs.

=== Clubs ===
After the conclusion of UAAP Season 85 in 2023, Alba made herself available to get signed by a Premier Volleyball League (PVL) club. By this time the PVL has already professionalized. She was signed by the F2 Logistics Cargo Movers.

In 2024 she was signed by the Choco Mucho Flying Titans after her previous team got disbanded from the league.

In 2025, she left the Flying Titans and she was signed by the Akari Chargers.

=== National team ===
In August 2025, she became part of Philippine national team. She was part of the squad which competed in the Leg 1 and 2 of 2025 SEA Women's V.League and SEA Games.

== Clubs ==
- (Philippines) F2 Logistics Cargo Movers (2023–2024)
- (Philippines) Choco Mucho Flying Titans (2024–2025)
- (Philippines) Akari Chargers (2025–present)

== Awards ==
=== Individuals ===
Year	League	Season/Conference	Award	Ref
2023	UAAP	85	Finals MVP	
2023	UAAP	85	Best Setter	

=== Collegiate ===
DLSU Lady Spikers

Year	League	Season/Conference	Title	Ref
2019	UAAP	81	3rd Place	
2022	UAAP	84	Runner-up	
2023	UAAP	85	Champion	

=== Clubs ===
==== PVL ====
Year	Conference	Club	Title	Ref
2024	All-Filipino	Choco Mucho Flying Titans	Runner-up	
2025	Reinforced	Akari Chargers	Bronze	

=== National team ===
Year	League	Season/Conference	Title	Ref
2025	SEA V.League	1st Leg	Bronze	
2025	SEA V.League	2nd Leg	Bronze	
