= Risa Sato =

Filipina-Japanese volleyball player (born 1994)

Personal information
- Born: October 4, 1994 (age 32); Osaka, Japan
- Height: 1.75 m (5 ft 9 in)
- Weight: 65 kg (143 lb)
- Spike: 275 cm (108 in)
- Block: 269 cm (106 in)
- Education: National University (2016–2020)

Volleyball information
- Position: Middle Blocker
- Current club: Akari Chargers

Career
| Years | Teams |
|---|---|
| 2016–2017 | BaliPure Purest Water Defenders |
| 2018–2024 | Creamline Cool Smashers |
| 2025 | Chery Tiggo Crossovers |
| 2026– | Akari Chargers |

National team
| 2015 | Philippines (U23) |
| 2015, 2018 | Philippines |

Risa Sato (佐藤 理沙, Satō Risa) is a Filipina-Japanese professional volleyball player who is a middle blocker for the Akari Chargers of the Premier Volleyball League (PVL). Currently living in the Philippines, she played in the University Athletic Association of the Philippines (UAAP) for the NU Lady Bulldogs.

== Early life ==
Risa Sato was born on October 4, 1994 in Osaka, Japan where she also spent her childhood. Her mother is Filipino while her father is Japanese. Sato played volleyball at school in Japan. She left Japan at age 19 along with her mother to pursue her dream to play in the Philippines.

== Career ==
Sato was brought to the Philippines in 2013 to play for the collegiate varsity team of the Ateneo de Manila University by Roger Gorayeb, who was then coach of the university. She played for Ateneo as a guest player in the Shakey's V-League. However she failed to get admitted to Ateneo due to failing the entrance examinations which was written in English. In August 2015, she underwent try-outs to play for the National University which by that time was already being mentored by Gorayeb. By July 2017 she was already playing for the National University where she is a second year college student pursuing a degree in sports and wellness management. By the same time she was already playing for the BaliPure Purest Water Defenders of the Premier Volleyball League. She won the Premier Volleyball League 1st Season Collegiate Conference championship with NU Lady Bulldogs.

During her collegiate career, she won the following individual awards: 1st best middle blocker (2017 PVL reinforced conference), 2nd best middle blocker (2017 PVL open conference) and 2nd best middle blocker (2017 PVL collegiate conference)

Sato also played for Creamline Cool Smashers from 2018 to 2024. In 2025, she transferred to the Chery Tiggo Crossovers.

In July 2026, Sato returned from a hiatus caused by her pregnancy to join the Akari Chargers.

=== National team ===
Sato made her international debut playing for the Philippine youth national team at the 2015 Asian Women's U23 Volleyball Championship which was hosted in Pasig. She was also part of the senior team squad that played in the 2015 VTV International Women's Volleyball Cup, an invitational tournament held in Vietnam.

== Personal life ==
Sato is engaged with basketball player and National University alumnus Enzo Joson. Sato announced that she is pregnant in October 2025 and later gave birth to her first child by the following month.

== Clubs ==
- (Philippines) BaliPure Purest Water Defenders (2016–2017)
- (Philippines) Creamline Cool Smashers (2018–2024)
- (Philippines) Chery Tiggo Crossovers (2025)

== Awards ==
=== Individuals ===
- 2017 Premier Volleyball League Reinforced Conference "1st Best Middle Blocker"
- 2017 Premier Volleyball League Open Conference "2nd Best Middle Blocker"
- 2017 Premier Volleyball League Collegiate Conference "2nd Best Middle Blocker"

=== Collegiate ===
- Shakey's V-League 12th Season Collegiate Conference – Silver medal, with Ateneo Lady Eagles
- Shakey's V-League 13th Season Collegiate Conference – Champion, with NU Lady Bulldogs
- UAAP Season 77 Women's volleyball tournament – Bronze medal, with NU Lady Bulldogs
- 2017 Premier Volleyball League Collegiate Conference – Champion, with NU Lady Bulldogs

=== Clubs ===
| Season | Tournament | Club | Title | Ref | | | | |
|---|---|---|---|---|---|---|---|---|
| Season | Tournament | Club | Title | Ref | 2017 PVL | Reinforced | BaliPure Purest Water Defenders | Runner-up |
| Open | Champions | | | | 2017 PVL | | BaliPure Purest Water Defenders | |
| 2018 PVL | Reinforced | Creamline Cool Smashers | Champions | | | | | |
| 2018 PVL | Open | Creamline Cool Smashers | Champions | | | | | |
| 2019 PVL | Reinforced | Creamline Cool Smashers | Runner-up | | | | | |
| 2019 PVL | Open | Creamline Cool Smashers | Champions | | | | | |
| 2021 PVL | Open | Creamline Cool Smashers | Runner-up | | | | | |
| 2022 PVL | Open | Creamline Cool Smashers | Champions | | | | | |
| 2022 PVL | Invitational | Creamline Cool Smashers | Champions | | | | | |
| 2022 PVL | Reinforced | Creamline Cool Smashers | 3rd Place | | | | | |
| 2023 PVL | 1st All-Filipino | Creamline Cool Smashers | Champions | | | | | |
| 2023 PVL | Invitational | Creamline Cool Smashers | Runner-up | | | | | |
| 2023 PVL | 2nd All-Filipino | Creamline Cool Smashers | Champions | | | | | |
| 2024 PVL | All-Filipino | Creamline Cool Smashers | Champions | | | | | |
| 2024 PVL | Reinforced | Creamline Cool Smashers | Champions | | | | | |
