= Taka Minowa =

Japanese volleyball coach

Personal information
- Full name: Takayuki Minowa
- Nickname: Taka
- Nationality: Japanese
- Born: Takayuki Minowa; 8 September 1991 (age 35); Fukui Prefecture, Japan
- Hometown: Sabae, Fukui

Coaching information
Previous teams coached
Years	Teams
2022; 2023; 2023–2024; 2024–2025; 2024; 2025; 2026	Japan (women; assistant); Liaoning Donghua (assistant); Nxled Chameleons; Akari Chargers; Philippines (women's U19); Aisin Tealmare Hekinan (assistant); Philippines (women)

Takayuki Minowa (蓑輪 貴幸, Minowa Takayuki; born 8 September 1991) is a Japanese volleyball coach whose last role as a head with Philippine women's club Akari Chargers of the Premier Volleyball League from 2024 to 2025.

== Early life ==
Takayuki Minowa was born on 8 September 1991 in the Fukui Prefecture in Japan and attended Chukyo University and the graduate school of Kokushikan University. Minowa played for the former's volleyball team.

== Career ==
=== Saitama Ageo Medics ===
Minowa was part of the Saitama Ageo Medics coaching staff for seven seasons. While still a student at Kokushikan, Minowa was appointed as coach in the club in 2015. He left in July 2022.

=== Japan women's ===
The Japan women's national volleyball team had Minowa as an assistant coach for their campaign in the 2022 AVC Cup for Women.

=== Liaoning Donghua ===
Minowa was an assistant coach for Liaoning Donghua, the Chinese club which took part at the 2023 Asian Women's Club Volleyball Championship.

=== Nxled Chameleons ===
Minowa moved to the Philippines to become head coach of newly formed Premier Volleyball League team Nxled Chameleons in 2023.

In December 2023, Akari Lighting & Technology promoted Minowa to Director of Volleyball Operations for both Nxled and the Akari Chargers while retaining his lead coaching role with the former. He coached Nxled for the 2024 All-Filipino Conference.

=== Akari Chargers ===
Ahead the inaugural 2024 draft and the 2024 Reinforced Conference, Nxled had a player swap with its sister team Akari. Minowa became the head coach of Akari as part of the reshuffle. He led Akari to its first ever runner-up finish. He announced his departure on 31 May 2025.

=== Aisin Tealmare Hekinan ===
In August 2025, Minowa returned to Japan to join Aisin Tealmare Hekinan of the men's division of the V.League as an assistant coach

=== Philippines women's U18 ===
Minowa led the Philippines women's national under-19 team which played in 2024 Asian Women's U18 Volleyball Championship

=== Philippines women's ===
Minowa was appointed as head coach of the Philippines women's national team. He took on the role from July 1, 2026 and guided the team in the 2026 Asian Games in September 2026. The team finished ninth place. Angiolino Frigoni took over his role in October 2026.

== Personal life ==
Minowa is married to Jaja Santiago who was a former Philippine national volleyball team player since 2022. He first met Santiago in 2018 when his future wife was with Saitama Ageo Medics as a player and he was a coach with the aforementioned team. Santiago is also known as Sachi Minowa after she obtained her Japanese citizenship in 2024.
