= Akari Chargers =

Professional women's volleyball team

- 2026–27 Akari Chargers season
- Short name: Akari
- Nickname: Chargers
- Founded: 2022
- History: Akari Chargers; 2022–present
- Owner: Akari Lighting & Technology Corporation
- Head coach: Tina Salak
- Captain: Justine Jazareno
- League: Premier Volleyball League
- 2026 All-Filipino: 6th place
- Website: akarisports.com.ph

The Akari Power Chargers, more commonly known as the Akari Chargers, are a Philippine women's professional volleyball team by Akari Lighting & Technology Corporation. The team competes in the Premier Volleyball League (PVL), where they have been since its establishment in 2022, and is the sister team to the Nxled Chameleons.

Akari's first venture into the PVL predates the Chargers itself, as they were the sponsor of the Adamson Lady Falcons during the 2018 Open Conference.

In 2024, Akari acquired Celine Domingo and Grethcel Soltones, which helped the team earn a series of podiums over the next few conferences. In the 2024 Reinforced Conference, they made the finals for the first time, where they lost to the Creamline Cool Smashers in the culminating series.

== History ==
The Akari Chargers was organized by Akari Lighting & Technology Corporation, announcing its official entry into the Premier Volleyball League as the 10th professional club team. Akari's has been a longtime sponsor of the Adamson Lady Falcons collegiate volleyball team which clinched the 2019 Premier Volleyball League Collegiate Conference.

Before the start of the 2022 reinforced conference, Akari announced that it tapped the Brazilian head coach of the Philippines women's national volleyball team, Jorge Souza de Brito to be its head coach. The team debuted in the 2022 Reinforced Conference.

The team made its first finals appearance in the PVL during the 2024 Reinforced Conference, where they settled for silver after losing 3–0 to the Creamline Cool Smashers.

== Current roster ==
Akari Chargers roster
No.	Nat.	Player	Pos.	Height	DOB	From
1	(Philippines)	Mary Rhose Dapol	Outside Hitter	1.70 m (5 ft 7 in)	December 1, 2000 (age 25)	UPHSD
2	(Philippines)	Fifi Sharma	Middle Blocker	1.78 m (5 ft 10 in)	April 27, 2001 (age 25)	De La Salle
3	(Philippines)	Chenie Tagaod	Outside Hitter	1.79 m (5 ft 10 in)	January 22, 2002 (age 24)	Far Eastern
4	(Philippines)	Justine Jazareno (C)	Libero	1.65 m (5 ft 5 in)	March 25, 2000 (age 26)	De La Salle
5	(Philippines)	Grethcel Soltones	Outside Hitter	1.73 m (5 ft 8 in)	September 9, 1995 (age 31)	San Sebastian
6	(Philippines) (Japan)	Risa Sato	Middle Blocker	1.76 m (5 ft 9 in)	October 4, 1994 (age 32)	National-U
8	(Philippines)	Jyne Soreño	Opposite Hitter	1.750 m (5 ft 9 in)	July 9, 2000 (age 26)	De La Salle
10	(Philippines)	Judith Abil	Libero	1.70 m (5 ft 7 in)	December 4, 1997 (age 28)	UE
11	(Philippines)	Faith Nisperos	Outside Hitter	1.76 m (5 ft 9 in)	January 2, 2000 (age 26)	Ateneo
12	(Philippines)	Eli Soyud	Opposite Hitter	1.74 m (5 ft 9 in)	December 27, 1995 (age 30)	Adamson
13	(Philippines)	Celine Domingo	Middle Blocker	1.75 m (5 ft 9 in)	April 20, 1999 (age 27)	Far Eastern
15	(Philippines)	Tin Tiamzon	Outside Hitter	1.76 m (5 ft 9 in)	May 4, 1997 (age 29)	De La Salle
16	(Philippines)	Ivy Lacsina	Outside Hitter	1.85 m (6 ft 1 in)	October 21, 1999 (age 26)	National-U
17	(Philippines)	Xyza Gula	Outside Hitter	1.62 m (5 ft 4 in)	August 30, 2003 (age 23)	UST
18	(Philippines)	Joyme Cagande	Setter	1.63 m (5 ft 4 in)	February 18, 1999 (age 27)	National-U
19	(Philippines)	Mars Alba	Setter	1.68 m (5 ft 6 in)	August 26, 1999 (age 27)	De La Salle
20	(Philippines)	Ann Monares	Libero	1.78 m (5 ft 10 in)	August 22, 2002 (age 24)	Far Eastern
25	(Philippines)	Sharya Ancheta	Middle Blocker	1.77 m (5 ft 10 in)	November 25, 1999 (age 26)	Adamson
Updated as of: October 8, 2026 | Source: PVL.ph

Coaching staff

- Head coach:
  Tina Salak
- Assistant coaches:
  Eddieson Orcullo
  Vince Mangulabnan
  Jeremiah Barrica
  Juvie Mangaring
  Jade Nadera
  Sid Gerella
- Strength & conditioning coach:
  Jem Manalang

Team staff

- Team manager:
  Nicole Tiamzon
- Utility:
  Jaecee Obena

Medical staff

- Physical therapists:
  Jules Parco & Joriki Suva
- Physiotherapist:
  Juliene Cuyugan
- Nutritionist:
  Dr. Jo-Ann Tan Lorenzo

== Season-by-season records ==
Season	Conference	Preliminary round	Final round	Ranking	Source
2022 (team)	Reinforced	8th (3–5, 9 pts)	Did not qualify	8th place	
2023 (team)	First All-Filipino	8th (2–6, 5 pts)	Did not qualify	8th place	
2023 (team)	Invitational	4th (1–3, 3 pts) (Pool A)	Did not qualify Lost in ninth place match va. Petro Gazz, 2–3	10th place	
2023 (team)	Second All-Filipino	7th (5–6, 14 pts)	Did not qualify	7th place	
2024–25 (team)	All-Filipino	7th (5–6, 15 pts)	Did not qualify	7th place	
2024–25 (team)	Reinforced	1st (8–0, 21 pts)	Won in quarterfinals vs. Farm Fresh, 3–1; Won in semifinals vs. PLDT, 3–2; Lost in championship vs. Creamline, 0–3	Runner-up	
2024–25 (team)	Invitational	Did not participate (Note: Although Akari qualified for the 2024 Invitational Conference, the team declined the invitation to participate in the conference due to injuries.)			
2024–25 (team)	All-Filipino	7th (5–6, 15 pts)	Won in quarterfinals vs. Galeries Tower, 2–0 (Note: Best-of-three series.); Finished 3rd in semifinals (1–2, 2 pts) (Note: Round-robin tournament.) Won in third place series vs. Choco Mucho, 2–1	3rd place	
2025–26 (team)	PVL on Tour	5th (2–3, 6 pts)	Lost in quarterfinals vs. Cignal, 0–3	8th place	
2025–26 (team)	Invitational	Did not qualify			
2025–26 (team)	Reinforced	8th (4–4, 12 pts)	Won in quarterfinals vs. Farm Fresh, 3–0; Lost in semifinals vs. Petro Gazz, 2–3 Won in third place match vs. PLDT, 3–2	3rd place	
2025–26 (team)	All-Filipino	6th (5–4, 15 pts)	Lost in Play-in final (Pool B) vs. Creamline, 1–3	6th place	
2026–27 (team)	Invitational	Did not qualify			

== Individual awards ==
Season	Conference	Award	Name	Ref.
2024–25	Reinforced	2nd Best Outside Spiker	(Philippines) Grethcel Soltones	

== Team captains ==
- (Philippines) Michelle Cobb (2022–2025)
- (Philippines) Justine Jazareno (2025–present)

== Imports ==
Season	Number	Player	Country
2022	14	Prisilla Rivera	Dominican Republic
2024	04	Oluoma Okaro	USA
2025	22	Annie Michem	USA

== Former players ==
Local players

Philippines

- Andrea Marzan (2022)
- Ysabela Bakabak (2024-2025)
- Bea Bonafe (2025-2026)
- Cza Carandang (2026)
- Bingle Landicho (2022)
- Camille Victoria (2023-2025)
- Cathrine Almazan (2024-2025)
- Chiara Permentilla (2022-2023)
- Dani Ravena (2022-2023, 2024-2026)
- Dindin Santiago-Manabat (2023-2024)
- Erika Raagas (2022–2025)
- Ezra Madrigal (2022–2025)
- Geneveve Casugod (2022)
- Gyra Barroga (2022)
- Jamaica Villena (2025-2026)
- Jamie Lavitoria (2022)
- Janel Maraguinot (2022-2024)
- Janine Marciano (2022–2024)
- Jhoana Maraguinot (2022-2023)
- Joan Doguna (2025-2026)
- Kamille Cal (2024-2026)
- Krich Macaslang (2022-2023)
- Luth Malaluan (2023)
- Lycha Ebon (2022-2023)
- Maxine Juangco (2024-2026)
- Michelle Cobb (2022-2025)
- Rachel Jorvina (2022-2023)
- Roselle Baliton (2023-2024)
- Shiela Marie Pineda (2023-2024)
- Stephanie Bustrillo (2024-2026)
- Trisha Genesis (2022-2024)

Foreign players

Dominican Republic

- Prisilla Rivera (2022)

USA

- Annie Mitchem (2025)
- Oluoma Okaro (2024)

== Draft history ==
Season	Pick No.	Name
2024	6	Stephanie Bustrillo
2025	10	Chenie Tagaod
2025	22	Jamaica Villena
2025	27	Joan Doguna
2026	6	Did not participate.

== Coaches ==
- (Brazil) Jorge Souza de Brito (2022–2023)
- (Philippines) Raffy Mosuela (2024; Interim coach)
- (Japan) Takayuki Minowa (2024–2025)
- (Philippines) Tina Salak (2025–present)
