= Fifi Sharma =

Filipino volleyball player

Personal information
- Full name: Mereophe Aevangeline Sharma
- Nickname: Fifi
- Nationality: Filipino
- Born: April 27, 2001 (age 25) Quezon City, Philippines
- Education: De La Salle University (2023)
- Height: 1.80 m (5 ft 11 in)
- Weight: 73 kg (161 lb)
- Spike: 297 cm (117 in)
- Block: 284 cm (112 in)

Volleyball information
- Position: Middle Blocker
- Current club: Akari Chargers
- Number: 14

Career
- Years: Team
- 2023–present: Akari Chargers

National team
- Years: Team
- 2024–present: Philippines
Honours
Women's volleyball
Representing Philippines
Asian Challenge Cup
Bronze medal – third place	2024 Manila	Team
SEA V.League
Bronze medal – third place	2024 Vĩnh Phúc	Leg 1
Bronze medal – third place	2024 Nakhon Ratchasima	Leg 2

Mereophe Aevangeline Sharma (born April 27, 2001) popularly known as Fifi, is a Filipino volleyball player. She is currently playing as a middle blocker for the Akari Chargers in the Premier Volleyball League.

== Career ==
=== College ===
Sharma played for the Lady Spikers of the De La Salle University in the University Athletic Association of the Philippines (UAAP). She was scouted by La Salle coach Ramil de Jesus in 2013, when Sharma was still with the Far Eastern University Diliman. She only played for La Salle for Season 85, helping them win the women's volleyball title.

=== Club ===
After the conclusion of UAAP Season 85 in 2023, Sharma made herself available to get signed by a Premier Volleyball League (PVL) club. By this time the PVL has already professionalized. She was signed by the Akari Chargers.

=== National team ===
In May 2024, she became part of Philippine national team. She was part of the squad which competed in the 2024 AVC Challenge Cup and bagged the bronze medal for the country.

== Personal life ==
Fifi Sharma is the daughter of former PBA player, Carlo Sharma. Aware of her father's experience, the younger Sharma originally had no plans to a sporting career of her own. However she changed her mind in a bid to secure a high school scholarship at the Far Eastern University Diliman. She tried getting into basketball but dropped it remarking how she did not like contact sports. Instead she took up volleyball at age 15.

She also dreamt of being a beach volleyball player, having played friendly matches with the Boracay Volleyball Club while on a family vacation in late 2024.

== Clubs ==
- (Philippines) Akari Chargers (2023–present)

== Awards ==
=== Collegiate ===
DLSU Lady Spikers

Year	League	Season/Conference	Title	Ref
2023	UAAP	85	Champion	

=== Clubs ===
Year	League	Season/Conference	Club	Title	Ref
2024–25	PVL	All-Filipino	Akari Chargers	3rd place	

=== National team ===
Year	League	Season/Conference	Title	Ref
2024	AVC	Challenge Cup	Bronze	
2024	SEA V.League	1st Leg	Bronze	
2024	SEA V.League	2nd Leg	Bronze	
