= Faith Nisperos =

Filipino volleyball player (born 2000)

Personal information
- Full name: Faith Janine Shirley Mallonga Nisperos
- Nationality: Filipino
- Born: January 2, 2000 (age 26)
- Hometown: Davao City, Philippines
- Height: 1.80 m (5 ft 11 in)
- Weight: 73 kg (161 lb)
- Spike: 302 cm (119 in)
- Block: 289 cm (114 in)
- Education: Ateneo de Manila University (2019–2023)

Volleyball information
- Position: Outside hitter
- Current club: Akari Chargers
- Number: 17

Career
Years	Teams
2018	BaliPure-NU
2021	Rebisco Philippines
2023–present	Akari Chargers

National team
2014	Philippines (U17)
2021, 2022–present	Philippines
Honours
Women's volleyball
Representing Philippines
Asian Challenge Cup
Bronze medal – third place	2024 Manila	Team
SEA V.League
Bronze medal – third place	2024 Vĩnh Phúc	Leg 1
Bronze medal – third place	2024 Nakhon Ratchasima	Leg 2

Faith Janine Shirley Mallonga Nisperos (born January 2, 2000) is a Filipino volleyball player who plays for the Akari Chargers of the Premier Volleyball League.

== Early life and education ==
Faith was raised in Davao City, to Ferdie and Sheila Nisperos. She is the second of the couple's four children. Faith Nisperos went to Ateneo de Davao University for her elementary education but transferred to Nazareth School of National University (NU) in seventh grade, thanks to a recruiting effort by Coach Edgar Barroga. She completed her senior high school studies in the same school.

She attended the Ateneo de Manila University for her collegiate studies.

== Career ==
=== College ===
Nisperos played for the Blue Eagles of the Ateneo de Manila University in the University Athletic Association of the Philippines (UAAP) volleyball championships. She played alongside her sister, Yssa.

She ended her stint with Ateneo in Season 85, after deciding to sign with the Akari Chargers in 2023. She foregoed her final year of eligibility.

=== Club ===
Nisperos initially played in the Premier Volleyball League as part of the BaliPure Purest Water Defenders, which was under a partnership with the National University at the time, in 2018

In 2021, she was part of the Philippine national team which competed as Rebisco Philippines, in the 2021 Asian Women's Club Volleyball Championship.

After the conclusion of UAAP Season 85 in 2023, Nisperos joined PVL. Seven teams offered her contracts. She eventually signed with the Akari Chargers.

=== National team ===
Nisperos has represented the Philippines in international tournaments. In 2014, she was part of the squad that took part in the Asian Girls' U17 Volleyball Championship. The Philippines returned to the tournament after a six year absence.

In 2021, Nisperos was a member of the Rebisco Women's Team Asian Club Volleyball Championships in Thailand.

Nisperos returned to international play when she and her Akari teammates were included in the Philippine senior national team squad which played in the 2023 Asian Women's Volleyball Challenge Cup in Indonesia from June 18 to 25. They finished seventh-place out of 11 teams winning a total of three games.

In 2024, she was added to be part of the Alas Pilipinas women's volleyball team, a long-term national team led by captain Jia de Guzman and built with a podium finish in the 2025 SEA Games as the ultimate goal. She mainly played as an opposite spiker, backing up Angel Canino first, then Alyssa Solomon. Her team won three bronze medals in one calendar year.

== Clubs ==
- (Philippines) Balipure-NU Water Defenders (2018)
- Rebisco Philippines (2021)
- (Philippines) Akari Chargers (2023–present)

== Awards ==
=== Individual ===
- 2013 UAAP Season 76 Juniors – "Rookie of the Year"
- 2014 UAAP Season 77 Juniors – "Season's Most Valuable Player"
- 2015 UAAP Season 78 Juniors – "Best attacker" and "Finals' Most Valuable Player"
- 2016 UAAP Season 79 Juniors – "1st Best Outside Hitter" and "Season's Most Valuable Player"
- 2017 UAAP Season 80 Juniors – "1st Best Outside Hitter" and "Finals' Most Valuable Player"
- 2022 UAAP Season 84 Women’s – "2nd Best Outside Hitter"
- 2015 Shakey's Girls Volleyball League Season 12 – NCR Leg "Best middle blocker" and "Most valuable player"'
- 2015 Shakey's Girls Volleyball League Season 12 – League of Champions "Best outside hitter"
- 2016 Shakey's Girls Volleyball League Season 13 – NCR Leg "Best outside hitter" and "Most valuable player"
- 2016 Shakey's Girls Volleyball League Season 13 National Finals – "Best outside hitter"
- 2016 Shakey's Girls Volleyball League Season 13 International Championship – "Most valuable player"
- 2015 Palarong Pambansa – "Best blocker" and "Most valuable player"
- 2019 Premier Volleyball League Collegiate Conference – "2nd Best Outside Hitter"
- 2022 V-League Women's Division Season 14 Collegiate Challenge – "1st Best Outside Hitter" and "Conference and Finals Most Valuable Player"

=== Collegiate team ===
- 2019 Premier Volleyball League Collegiate Conference − Bronze medal, with Ateneo Lady Eagles
- UAAP Season 84 women's volleyball tournament − Bronze medal, with Ateneo Lady Eagles
- 2022 V-League Collegiate Challenge - Gold medal, with Ateneo Lady Eagles

=== Club team ===
- 2024 Premier Volleyball League Reinforced Conference − Silver medal, with Akari Chargers
- 2024-25 Premier Volleyball League All-Filipino Conference − Bronze medal, with Akari Chargers
- 2025 Premier Volleyball League Reinforced Conference − Bronze medal, with Akari Chargers
