= List of Premier Volleyball League records =

This article lists notable records of the Premier Volleyball League (PVL), the Philippines' sole women's professional volleyball league since its formation in 2017.

== Individual records ==
- Most awards
  - 13 by Alyssa Valdez
- Most Conference MVP awards
  - 3 by Tots Carlos, Alyssa Valdez, and Brooke Van Sickle
- Most Finals MVP awards
  - 4 by Jia de Guzman
- Won Conference and Finals MVP in a single conference
  - Isa Molde, 2018 Collegiate Conference
  - Jaja Santiago, 2021 Open Conference
  - Bernadeth Pons, 2024 Reinforced Conference
- Most All-Premier Team selections
  - 9 by Alyssa Valdez
- Most All-Premier Team selections by position
  - Best Outside Hitter: 9 by Alyssa Valdez
  - Best Middle Blocker: 9 by Jeanette Panaga
  - Best Opposite Spiker: 4 by Tots Carlos
  - Best Setter: 8 by Jia de Guzman
  - Best Libero: 5 by Kath Arado & Thang Ponce

=== Statistical records ===
- Most points in a single match by a local player
  - 38 (35 attacks, 3 blocks) by Tots Carlos, March 26, 2024
- Most points in a single match by a foreign guest player
  - 50 (47 attacks, 2 blocks, 1 ace) by Marina Tushova, August 24, 2024
- Most 30-point matches in a single conference by a local player
  - 3 by Kat Tolentino, 2019 Open Conference
  - 3 by Savi Davison, 2024–25 All-Filipino Conference, 2026 Invitational Conference
- Most 30-point matches in a single conference by a foreign guest player
  - 5 by Oluoma Okaro, 2024 Reinforced Conference
  - 5 by Elena Savkina-Samoilenko, 2024 Reinforced Conference
  - 5 by Marina Tushova, 2024 Reinforced Conference
- Most points per set in a single match
  - 11.33 by Lindsay Vander Weide, December 1, 2022
- Most spikes in a single match
  - 47 by Marina Tushova, August 24, 2024
- Most blocks in a single match
  - 10 by Ria Meneses, July 30, 2021
  - 10 by Maddie Madayag, November 8, 2025
- Most aces in a single match
  - 8 by Alyssa Valdez, May 27, 2018
- Most excellent sets in a match
  - 71 by Jia de Guzman, July 5, 2017
- Most excellent digs in a match
  - 48 by Dawn Macandili-Catindig, July 1, 2023
- Most reception attempts with 100% reception efficiency
  - 14 by Kath Arado, February 16, 2023

=== 30-point club ===
The following players scored at least 30 points in a single match.

Key
Indicates current league scoring record
Indicates former scoring record-holders (all-time)
Indicates former scoring record-holders (professional era only)

==== Local players ====
Premier Volleyball League 30-point Club (Local Players)
Player	Club	Opponent	Conference	Points
Semi-professional era (2017-2019)
Jovielyn Grace Prado	Power Smashers	Perlas Spikers	2017 Reinforced	31
Alyssa Valdez	Creamline Cool Smashers	BaliPure Purest Water Defenders	2017 Open	37
Alyssa Valdez	Creamline Cool Smashers	Pocari Sweat Lady Warriors	2017 Open	30
Alyssa Valdez	Creamline Cool Smashers	Ateneo-Motolite Lady Eagles	2018 Open	32
Myla Pablo	Pocari Sweat Lady Warriors	Power Smashers	2017 Open	30
Myla Pablo	Pocari Sweat Lady Warriors	Ateneo-Motolite Lady Eagles	2018 Open	30
Milena Alessandrini	UST Golden Tigresses	Adamson Lady Falcons	2018 Collegiate	31
Grazielle Bombita	BaliPure Purest Water Defenders	BanKo Perlas Spikers	2019 Open	31
Katrina Mae Tolentino	Choco Mucho Flying Titans	PacificTown-Army Lady Troopers	2019 Open	30
Katrina Mae Tolentino	Choco Mucho Flying Titans	Motolite Power Builders	2019 Open	33
Katrina Mae Tolentino	Choco Mucho Flying Titans	Chef's Classics Lady Red Spikers	2019 Open	36
Faith Janine Shirley Nisperos	Ateneo Lady Eagles	Benilde Lady Blazers	2019 Collegiate	35
Professional era (2021–present)
Aleona Denise Santiago-Manabat	Chery Tiggo Crossovers	Creamline Cool Smashers	2021 Open	32
Aleona Denise Santiago-Manabat	Chery Tiggo Crossovers	Army Black Mamba Lady Troopers	2022 Open	32
Katrina Mae Tolentino	Choco Mucho Flying Titans	Cignal HD Spikers	2022 Invitational	31
Grethcel Soltones	Petro Gazz Angels	F2 Logistics Cargo Movers	2023 Invitational	31
Trisha Gayle Tubu	Farm Fresh Foxies	F2 Logistics Cargo Movers	2023 2nd All-Filipino	30
Trisha Gayle Tubu	Farm Fresh Foxies	Choco Mucho Flying Titans	2024 All-Filipino	32
Trisha Gayle Tubu	Farm Fresh Foxies	Choco Mucho Flying Titans	2024–25 All-Filipino	31
Trisha Gayle Tubu	Farm Fresh Foxies	Galeries Tower Highrisers	2024–25 All-Filipino	33
Trisha Gayle Tubu	Farm Fresh Foxies	Capital1 Solar Spikers	2026 All-Filipino	30
Trisha Gayle Tubu	Farm Fresh Foxies	PLDT High Speed Hitters	2026 All-Filipino	30
Trisha Gayle Tubu	Farm Fresh Foxies	PLDT High Speed Hitters	2026–27 All-Filipino	30
Jolina Dela Cruz	F2 Logistics Cargo Movers	Cignal HD Spikers	2023 2nd All-Filipino	30
Savi Davison	PLDT High Speed Hitters	Choco Mucho Flying Titans	2023 2nd All-Filipino	31
Savi Davison	PLDT High Speed Hitters	Creamline Cool Smashers	2024–25 All-Filipino	34
Savi Davison	PLDT High Speed Hitters	Zus Coffee Thunderbelles	2024–25 All-Filipino	34
Savi Davison	PLDT High Speed Hitters	Choco Mucho Flying Titans	2024–25 All-Filipino	34
Savi Davison	PLDT High Speed Hitters	Creamline Cool Smashers	2025 PVL on Tour	34
Savi Davison	PLDT High Speed Hitters	Chery Tiggo EV Crossovers	2025 Reinforced	36
Savi Davison	PLDT High Speed Hitters	Akari Chargers	2025 Reinforced	30
Savi Davison	PLDT High Speed Hitters	Farm Fresh Foxies	2026 All-Filipino	32
Savi Davison	PLDT High Speed Hitters	Farm Fresh Foxies	2026 All-Filipino	33
Savi Davison	PLDT High Speed Hitters	Est Cola (guest)	2026 Invitational	30
Savi Davison	PLDT High Speed Hitters	Farm Fresh Foxies	2026 Invitational	32
Savi Davison	PLDT High Speed Hitters	Creamline Cool Smashers	2026 Invitational	37
Savi Davison	PLDT High Speed Hitters	Choco Mucho Flying Titans	2026–27 All-Filipino	30
Sisi Rondina	Choco Mucho Flying Titans	Creamline Cool Smashers	2023 2nd All-Filipino	33
Sisi Rondina	Choco Mucho Flying Titans	Petro Gazz Angels	2024 All-Filipino	31
Sisi Rondina	Choco Mucho Flying Titans	Creamline Cool Smashers	2024 All-Filipino	31
Sisi Rondina	Choco Mucho Flying Titans	PLDT High Speed Hitters	2024–25 All-Filipino	31
Diana Mae Carlos	Creamline Cool Smashers	Akari Chargers	2024 All-Filipino	31
Diana Mae Carlos	Creamline Cool Smashers	Cignal HD Spikers	2024 All-Filipino	38
Brooke Van Sickle	Petro Gazz Angels	Chery Tiggo Crossovers	2024 All-Filipino	36
Brooke Van Sickle	Petro Gazz Angels	Chery Tiggo Crossovers	2024 All-Filipino	30
Brooke Van Sickle	Petro Gazz Angels	PLDT High Speed Hitters	2024 Reinforced	32
Brooke Van Sickle	Petro Gazz Angels	Choco Mucho Flying Titans	2024–25 All-Filipino	34
Eli Soyud	Akari Chargers	Choco Mucho Flying Titans	2024–25 All-Filipino	34
Eli Soyud	Akari Chargers	Farm Fresh Foxies	2026–27 All-Filipino	30
Erika Santos	Cignal HD Spikers	Zus Coffee Thunderbelles	2025 PVL on Tour	30
Ivy Lacsina	Akari Chargers	Choco Mucho Flying Titans	2026 All-Filipino	30
Bella Belen	Capital1 Solar Spikers	Akari Chargers	2026–27 All-Filipino	35

==== Foreign players ====
Premier Volleyball League 30-point Club (Foreign Players)
Player	Club	Opponent	Conference	Points
Semi-professional era (2017-2019)
(Brazil) Rupia Inck	Perlas Spikers	Philippine Air Force Jet Spikers	2017 Reinforced	30
(United States) Michelle Strizak	Pocari Sweat Lady Warriors	Philippine Air Force Jet Spikers	2017 Reinforced	40
(United States) Michelle Strizak	Pocari Sweat Lady Warriors	Creamline Cool Smashers	2017 Reinforced	30
(United States) Michelle Strizak	Pocari Sweat Lady Warriors	Power Smashers	2017 Reinforced	30
(United States) Janisa Johnson †	BaliPure-NU Water Defenders	Pocari Sweat-Air Force Lady Warriors	2018 Reinforced	35
(United States) Janisa Johnson †	BaliPure-NU Water Defenders	BanKo Perlas Spikers	2018 Reinforced	31
(United States) Tess Nicole Rountree	PayMaya High Flyers	BanKo Perlas Spikers	2018 Reinforced	39
(United States) Tess Nicole Rountree	PayMaya High Flyers	BanKo Perlas Spikers	2018 Reinforced	31
(United States) Tess Nicole Rountree	PayMaya High Flyers	BanKo Perlas Spikers	2018 Reinforced	34
(United States) Tess Nicole Rountree	PayMaya High Flyers	BanKo Perlas Spikers	2018 Reinforced	35
(Ukraine) Olena Lymareva-Flink	Petro Gazz Angels	Pocari Sweat-Air Force Lady Warriors	2018 Reinforced	30
(Ukraine) Olena Lymareva-Flink	PacificTown-Army Lady Troopers	Creamline Cool Smashers	2019 Reinforced	31
(Ukraine) Olena Lymareva-Flink	PacificTown-Army Lady Troopers	BanKo Perlas Spikers	2019 Reinforced	32
(United States) Macy Ubben	Iriga City–Navy Oragons	BaliPure-NU Water Defenders	2018 Reinforced	32
(Thailand) Jutarat Montripila	BanKo Perlas Spikers	Iriga City–Navy Oragons	2018 Reinforced	37
(Thailand) Jutarat Montripila	BanKo Perlas Spikers	PayMaya High Flyers	2018 Reinforced	31
(United States) Lakia Jamiah Bright	BanKo Perlas Spikers	PayMaya High Flyers	2018 Reinforced	35
(United States) Lakia Jamiah Bright	BanKo Perlas Spikers	PayMaya High Flyers	2018 Reinforced	41
(United States) Lakia Jamiah Bright	BanKo Perlas Spikers	Pocari Sweat-Air Force Lady Warriors	2018 Reinforced	33
(Cuba) Wilma Salas	Petro Gazz Angels	BanKo Perlas Spikers	2019 Reinforced	37
(Cuba) Wilma Salas	Petro Gazz Angels	Creamline Cool Smashers	2019 Reinforced	30
(Trinidad and Tobago) Channon Thompson	Motolite Power Builders	BanKo Perlas Spikers	2019 Reinforced	30
Professional era (2021–present)
(Russia) Elena Savkina-Samoilenko	PLDT High Speed Hitters	United Auctioneers Army Lady Troopers	2022 Reinforced	35
(Russia) Elena Savkina-Samoilenko	PLDT High Speed Hitters	Chery Tiggo Crossovers	2022 Reinforced	35
(Russia) Elena Savkina-Samoilenko	PLDT High Speed Hitters	Creamline Cool Smashers	2024 Reinforced	34
(Russia) Elena Savkina-Samoilenko	PLDT High Speed Hitters	Choco Mucho Flying Titans	2024 Reinforced	30
(Russia) Elena Savkina-Samoilenko	PLDT High Speed Hitters	Chery Tiggo Crossovers	2024 Reinforced	37
(Russia) Elena Savkina-Samoilenko	PLDT High Speed Hitters	Akari Chargers	2024 Reinforced	30
(Russia) Elena Savkina-Samoilenko	PLDT High Speed Hitters	Cignal HD Spikers	2024 Reinforced	35
(Dominican Republic) Prisilla Rivera	Akari Chargers	Chery Tiggo Crossovers	2022 Reinforced	30
(Dominican Republic) Prisilla Rivera	Akari Chargers	Choco Mucho Flying Titans	2022 Reinforced	44
(Dominican Republic) Prisilla Rivera	Akari Chargers	F2 Logistics Cargo Movers	2022 Reinforced	32
(Azerbaijan) Odina Aliyeva	Choco Mucho Flying Titans	PLDT High Speed Hitters	2022 Reinforced	30
(United States) Lindsey Vander Weide	Petro Gazz Angels	Cignal HD Spikers	2022 Reinforced	30
(United States) Lindsey Vander Weide	Petro Gazz Angels	Cignal HD Spikers	2022 Reinforced	34
(United States) Lindsey Vander Weide	Petro Gazz Angels	PLDT High Speed Hitters	2025 Reinforced	35
(Japan) Asaka Tamaru	Kurashiki Ablaze (guest)	PLDT High Speed Hitters	2023 Invitational	30
(Venezuela) María José Pérez	Cignal HD Spikers	Zus Coffee Thunderbelles	2024 Reinforced	30
(Venezuela) María José Pérez	Cignal HD Spikers	Galeries Tower Highrisers	2024 Reinforced	34
(Venezuela) María José Pérez	Cignal HD Spikers	Capital1 Solar Spikers	2024 Reinforced	34
(Venezuela) María José Pérez	Cignal HD Spikers	Creamline Cool Smashers	2024 Reinforced	32
(Venezuela) María José Pérez	Cignal HD Spikers	Creamline Cool Smashers	2024 Invitational	35
(Venezuela) María José Pérez	Cignal HD Spikers	Kurashiki Ablaze (guest)	2024 Invitational	36
(Venezuela) María José Pérez	Cignal HD Spikers	Creamline Cool Smashers	2024 Invitational	42
(United States) Oluoma Okaro	Akari Chargers	Choco Mucho Flying Titans	2024 Reinforced	38
(United States) Oluoma Okaro	Akari Chargers	Petro Gazz Angels	2024 Reinforced	31
(United States) Oluoma Okaro	Akari Chargers	Galeries Tower Highrisers	2024 Reinforced	32
(United States) Oluoma Okaro	Akari Chargers	Nxled Chameleons	2024 Reinforced	30
(United States) Oluoma Okaro	Akari Chargers	PLDT High Speed Hitters	2024 Reinforced	39
(United States) Katherine Bell	Chery Tiggo Crossovers	Creamline Cool Smashers	2024 Reinforced	31
(United States) Katherine Bell	Chery Tiggo Crossovers	PLDT High Speed Hitters	2024 Reinforced	39
(United States) Katherine Bell	Chery Tiggo Crossovers	PLDT High Speed Hitters	2024 Reinforced	40
(Russia) Marina Tushova	Capital1 Solar Spikers	Choco Mucho Flying Titans	2024 Reinforced	45
(Russia) Marina Tushova	Capital1 Solar Spikers	Zus Coffee Thunderbelles	2024 Reinforced	32
(Russia) Marina Tushova	Capital1 Solar Spikers	Nxled Chameleons	2024 Reinforced	49
(Russia) Marina Tushova	Capital1 Solar Spikers	Galeries Tower Highrisers	2024 Reinforced	35
(Russia) Marina Tushova	Capital1 Solar Spikers	Cignal HD Spikers	2024 Reinforced	50
(Cuba) Wilma Salas	Petro Gazz Angels	Creamline Cool Smashers	2024 Reinforced	34
(Cuba) Wilma Salas	Petro Gazz Angels	PLDT High Speed Hitters	2024 Reinforced	40
(United States) Erica Staunton	Creamline Cool Smashers	Petro Gazz Angels	2024 Reinforced	30
(United States) Erica Staunton	Creamline Cool Smashers	Cignal HD Spikers	2024 Reinforced	38
(Thailand) Warisara Seetaloed	Est Cola (guest)	Farm Fresh Foxies	2024 Invitational	33
(Belgium) Helene Rousseaux	Farm Fresh Foxies	Nxled Chameleons	2025 Reinforced	38
(Belgium) Helene Rousseaux	Farm Fresh Foxies	Capital1 Solar Spikers	2025 Reinforced	36
(Belgium) Helene Rousseaux	Farm Fresh Foxies	Petro Gazz Angels	2025 Reinforced	31
(United States) Anna DeBeer	Zus Coffee Thunderbelles	Chery Tiggo EV Crossovers	2025 Reinforced	37
(United States) Anna DeBeer	Zus Coffee Thunderbelles	Creamline Cool Smashers	2025 Reinforced	37
(United States) Anna DeBeer	Zus Coffee Thunderbelles	Akari Chargers	2025 Reinforced	33
(United States) Anna DeBeer	Zus Coffee Thunderbelles	PLDT High Speed Hitters	2025 Reinforced	30
(United States) Annie Michem	Akari Chargers	Creamline Cool Smashers	2025 Reinforced	33
(United States) Annie Michem	Akari Chargers	Petro Gazz Angels	2025 Reinforced	30
(United States) Annie Michem	Akari Chargers	Choco Mucho Flying Titans	2025 Reinforced	30
(United States) Annie Michem	Akari Chargers	PLDT High Speed Hitters	2025 Reinforced	36
(Ukraine) Oleksandra Bytsenko	Capital1 Solar Spikers	Nxled Chameleons	2025 Reinforced	39
(Ukraine) Oleksandra Bytsenko	Capital1 Solar Spikers	Chery Tiggo EV Crossovers	2025 Reinforced	34
(Ukraine) Oleksandra Bytsenko	Capital1 Solar Spikers	Galeries Tower Highrisers	2025 Reinforced	35
(Spain) Paola Martinez Vela	Nxled Chameleons	Cignal Super Spikers	2025 Reinforced	38
(Cuba) Yunieska Batista	Chery Tiggo EV Crossovers	Capital1 Solar Spikers	2025 Reinforced	41

== Team records ==
- Grand Slam (won all titles in a three-conference season)
  - Creamline Cool Smashers (2024 season)
- Golden Double (won all titles in a two-conference season)
  - Creamline Cool Smashers (2018 season)
- Most championships
  - 10 by Creamline Cool Smashers
- Most championships per conference
  - All-Filipino Conference: 6 by Creamline Cool Smashers
  - Reinforced Conference: 3 by Petro Gazz Angels
  - Invitational Conference: 2 by Creamline Cool Smashers
- Most championship appearances
  - 14 by Creamline Cool Smashers
- Most podium finishes
  - 20 by Creamline Cool Smashers
- Longest winning streak
  - 25 by Creamline Cool Smashers

== Match statistic records ==
- Most combined points in a single match
  - 242 by Perlas Spikers and Power Smashers, May 6, 2017
- Least combined points in a single match
  - 103 by Adamson–Akari Lady Falcons and Creamline Cool Smashers, November 24, 2018
- Most combined points in a single set
  - 80 by Choco Mucho Flying Titans and PacificTown-Army Lady Troopers, August 21, 2019 (set 1)
- Least combined points in a single set
  - 28 by BaliPure Purest Water Defenders and Creamline Cool Smashers, July 28, 2021 (set 2)
- Longest-running match
  - 3 hours and 25 minutes by F2 Logistics Cargo Movers and Petro Gazz Angels, July 13, 2023
- Shortest-running match
  - 1 hour and 2 minutes by Adamson–Akari Lady Falcons and Creamline Cool Smashers, November 24, 2018
- Highest attendance
  - 24,459 by Choco Mucho Flying Titans and Creamline Cool Smashers, December 16, 2023
