= Creamline–Petro Gazz rivalry =

Filipino volleyball rivalry

- Teams: Creamline Cool Smashers; Petro Gazz Angels
- First meeting: May 6, 2018; Creamline 3–0 Petro Gazz
- Latest meeting: November 24, 2025; Petro Gazz 3–1 Creamline

Statistics
- Total meetings: 39
- All-time series: 29–10 (CCS)
- Longest win streak: CCS W14
- Current win streak: PGA W1

Finals history
- 2019 PVL RC: Petro Gazz won, 2–1; 2019 PVL OC: Creamline won, 2–0; 2022 PVL OC: Creamline won, 2–0; 2023 PVL 1st AFC: Creamline won, 2–1; 2024–25 PVL AFC: Petro Gazz won, 2–1

The Creamline–Petro Gazz rivalry was a Premier Volleyball League (PVL) rivalry between the Creamline Cool Smashers and Petro Gazz Angels. Until 2025, both teams were among the longest-tenured in the PVL and combine for 13 of the league's titles, facing each other in the championship in five of those occasions.

The two teams have met each other a total of 39 times, which included 13 games in the Finals. Creamline led the all-time series with a 29–10 record.

== History ==
=== Background ===
The Creamline Cool Smashers, owned by Rebisco, joined the Premier Volleyball League in 2017 as one of its founding teams. The Petro Gazz Angels, owned by PetroGazz Ventures Phils., joined the PVL the following season in 2018. Both teams are the two longest-tenured in the PVL.

=== 2018–2019: Early history and first championship series ===
The first meeting between the two teams happened during the opening day of the 2018 Reinforced Conference on May 6, 2018. The match was won by Creamline in straight sets. In the following Open Conference, the two teams met in the final round for the first time. Creamline swept Petro Gazz in the semifinals in two games on their way to their second title. In the 2019 Reinforced Conference, the two teams met in the championship for the first time, with Petro Gazz beating Creamline in three games to clinch their first-ever league title.

=== 2019–2023: Creamline dominance ===
Following the 2019 Reinforced Conference, the rivalry would largely be dominated by Creamline. From the 2019 Open Conference to the 2023 Second All-Filipino Conference, Creamline would go 17–1 against Petro Gazz. That stretch included three championship series.

The second championship series between the two teams happened in the 2019 Open Conference. Creamline not only swept the series, but also won both games in straight sets. The next championship series happened in the 2022 Open Conference, which once again featured a Creamline sweep. This is then followed by their championship series in the 2023 First All-Filipino Conference, but this time around, Petro Gazz were able to win the first game of the series, giving the Cool Smashers their first loss against the Angels since the 2019 Reinforced Conference championship. However, Creamline went on to win the next two games to claim their sixth title. After the 2023 Second All-Filipino Conference, Creamline led 23–5 in games against Petro Gazz.

=== 2024–present: End of rivalry ===
After four years of Creamline dominance, the series began to equalize as both teams would split the season series in 2024 with two wins apiece, going 1–1 in both the All-Filipino and Reinforced conferences. In the 2024–25 All-Filipino Conference, the two teams met once again in the championship. The first two games of the series reached five sets with Petro Gazz winning the first and Creamline winning the second. In the third game, in four sets, the Angels clinched their third title and their second against the Cool Smashers.

On November 24, 2025, during the quarterfinals of the 2025 Reinforced Conference, Petro Gazz defeated Creamline in four sets, which ended the latter's streak of 19 straight podium finishes. On January 10, 2026, Petro Gazz took a leave of absence, thus putting a stop to the rivalry. However, a majority of the disbanded Angels roster were signed by the Nxled Chameleons, potentially setting up its spiritual successor.

== Records by season and conference ==
Season	Season series	Conference	Conference series	Overall series
2018	Creamline, 4–1	Reinforced	Creamline, 1–0	Creamline, 4–1
2018	Creamline, 4–1	Open	Creamline, 3–1	Creamline, 4–1
2019	Creamline, 6–3	Reinforced	Petro Gazz, 3–2	Creamline, 10–4
2019	Creamline, 6–3	Open	Creamline, 4–0	Creamline, 10–4
2021	Creamline, 3–0	Open	Creamline, 3–0	Creamline, 13–4
2022	Creamline, 6–0	Open	Creamline, 3–0	Creamline, 19–4
2022	Creamline, 6–0	Invitational	Creamline, 1–0	Creamline, 19–4
2022	Creamline, 6–0	Reinforced	Creamline, 2–0	Creamline, 19–4
2023	Creamline, 4–1	First All-Filipino	Creamline, 3–1	Creamline, 23–5
2023	Creamline, 4–1	Second All-Filipino	Creamline, 1–0	Creamline, 23–5
2024–25	Petro Gazz, 5–4	All-Filipino	Tie, 1–1	Creamline, 28–9
2024–25	Petro Gazz, 5–4	Reinforced	Tie, 1–1	Creamline, 28–9
2024–25	Petro Gazz, 5–4	All-Filipino	Petro Gazz, 3–2	Creamline, 28–9
2025–26	Tie, 1–1	Reinforced	Tie, 1–1	Creamline, 29–10

== Head-to-head records ==
Season	Conference	Stage	Date		Score		Set 1	Set 2	Set 3	Set 4	Set 5	Total
2018	Reinforced	Preliminary round	May 6, 2018	Creamline	3–0	Petro Gazz	25–18	25–16	25–13			75–47
2018	Open	Preliminary round	September 29, 2018	Creamline	2–3	Petro Gazz	25–27	25–17	23–25	25–19	5–15	103–103
2018	Open	Preliminary round	November 21, 2018	Petro Gazz	0–3	Creamline	11–25	13–25	23–25			47–75
2018	Open	Semifinals	November 28, 2018	Creamline	3–1	Petro Gazz	26–28	25–15	25–13	25–16		101–72
2018	Open	Semifinals	December 1, 2018	Petro Gazz	1–3	Creamline	25–21	18–25	21–25	13–25		77–96
2019	Reinforced	Preliminary round	May 26, 2019	Petro Gazz	3–0	Creamline	25–22	26–24	25–22			76–68
2019	Reinforced	Preliminary round	June 22, 2019	Petro Gazz	1–3	Creamline	18–25	25–21	19–25	24–26		86–97
2019	Reinforced	Championship	July 10, 2019	Petro Gazz	1–3	Creamline	26–24	16–25	16–25	22–25		80–99
2019	Reinforced	Championship	July 13, 2019	Creamline	1–3	Petro Gazz	25–15	22–25	22–25	12–25		81–90
2019	Reinforced	Championship	July 14, 2019	Petro Gazz	3–1	Creamline	25–15	28–30	25–23	25–19		103–87
2019	Open	Preliminary round	August 24, 2019	Creamline	3–0	Petro Gazz	25–19	28–26	25–20			78–65
2019	Open	Preliminary round	October 13, 2019	Petro Gazz	1–3	Creamline	21–25	24–26	25–19	18–25		88–95
2019	Open	Championship	November 6, 2019	Creamline	3–0	Petro Gazz	25–14	25–22	27–25			77–61
2019	Open	Championship	November 9, 2019	Petro Gazz	0–3	Creamline	27–29	22–25	25–27			74–81
2021	Open	Preliminary round	July 20, 2021	Creamline	3–1	Petro Gazz	24–26	28–26	25–22	25–20		102–94
2021	Open	Semifinals	August 8, 2021	Petro Gazz	2–3	Creamline	29–27	23–25	25–16	17–25	14–16	108–109
2021	Open	Semifinals	August 9, 2021	Creamline	3–0	Petro Gazz	27–25	25–22	25–16			77–63
2022	Open	Preliminary round	March 23, 2022	Petro Gazz	2–3	Creamline	23–25	25–23	19–25	25–23	10–15	102–111
2022	Open	Championship	April 6, 2022	Petro Gazz	1–3	Creamline	16–25	25–23	12–25	30–32		83–105
2022	Open	Championship	April 8, 2022	Creamline	3–1	Petro Gazz	25–18	15–25	25–23	25–16		90–82
2022	Invitational	Preliminary round	July 12, 2022	Creamline	3–1	Petro Gazz	25–22	23–25	25–22	25–20		98–89
2022	Reinforced	Preliminary round	October 18, 2022	Creamline	3–1	Petro Gazz	25–19	16–25	25–18	27–25		93–87
2022	Reinforced	Semifinals	November 24, 2022	Petro Gazz	0–3	Creamline	21–25	20–25	23–25			64–75
2023	First All-Filipino	Preliminary round	February 4, 2023	Creamline	3–0	Petro Gazz	25–18	25–20	25–22			75–60
2023	First All-Filipino	Championship	March 26, 2023	Creamline	1–3	Petro Gazz	22–25	26–24	23–25	24–26		95–100
2023	First All-Filipino	Championship	March 28, 2023	Petro Gazz	2–3	Creamline	25–18	16–25	18–25	25–23	6–15	90–106
2023	First All-Filipino	Championship	March 30, 2023	Creamline	3–1	Petro Gazz	20–25	25–20	25–18	25–15		95–78
2023	Second All-Filipino	Preliminary round	November 9, 2023	Creamline	3–2	Petro Gazz	25–22	23–25	25–27	25–19	15–13	113–106
2024	All-Filipino	Preliminary round	April 6, 2024	Petro Gazz	3–2	Creamline	15–25	25–18	24–26	25–19	15–13	104–101
2024	All-Filipino	Semifinals	May 2, 2024	Petro Gazz	1–3	Creamline	25–27	25–23	25–27	24–26		99–103
2024	Reinforced	Second round	August 13, 2024	Creamline	2–3	Petro Gazz	23–25	19–25	25–20	25–23	12–15	104–108
2024	Reinforced	Quarterfinals	August 27, 2024	Creamline	3–0	Petro Gazz	25–23	25–19	25–18			75–60
2024–25	All-Filipino	Preliminary round	November 16, 2024	Creamline	3–0	Petro Gazz	25–19	25–22	25–16			75–57
2024–25	All-Filipino	Semifinals	March 29, 2025	Creamline	1–3	Petro Gazz	23–25	22–25	25–21	16–25		86–96
2024–25	All-Filipino	Championship	April 8, 2025	Creamline	2–3	Petro Gazz	17–25	20–25	25–18	25–20	10–15	97–103
2024–25	All-Filipino	Championship	April 10, 2025	Petro Gazz	2–3	Creamline	15–25	25–16	21–25	25–15	9–15	95–96
2024–25	All-Filipino	Championship	April 12, 2025	Creamline	1–3	Petro Gazz	21–25	16–25	25–23	19–25		81–98
