= 2018 Premier Volleyball League season =

Second season of the Premier Volleyball League

- League: Premier Volleyball League
- Sport: Volleyball
- Duration: April 17 – December 8, 2018
- TV partner(s): ABS-CBN Sports and Action; Liga & Liga HD

Conferences
- Reinforced champions: Creamline
- Reinforced runners-up: PayMaya
- Collegiate champions: UP
- Collegiate runners-up: FEU
- Open champions: Creamline
- Open runners-up: Ateneo–Motolite

PVL seasons
- ← 2017 2019 →

The 2018 Premier Volleyball League (PVL) season was the second season of the Premier Volleyball League. There were three conferences for this season.

== Reinforced conference ==
=== Participating teams ===
2018 Premier Volleyball League Reinforced Conference (Women's Division)
Abbr.	Team	Company	Head coach	Team captain	Import(s)
BLP	BaliPure–NU Water Defenders	Balibago Waterworks System, Inc.	(Philippines) Raymund Castillo	(Philippines) Joyme Cagande	(United States) Alexis Matthews (United States) Janisa Johnson
BKP	BanKo Perlas Spikers	Beach Volleyball Republic	(Philippines) Ariel dela Cruz	(Philippines) Sue Roces	(United States) Lakia Bright (Thailand) Jutarat Montripila
CCS	Creamline Cool Smashers	Republic Biscuit Corporation	(Thailand) Tai Bundit	(Philippines) Alyssa Valdez	(Thailand) Kuttika Kaewpin (United States) Laura Schaudt (Serbia) Nikolina Aščerić (withdrew)
IRG	Iriga City–Navy Oragons	Iriga City / Philippine Navy	(Philippines) Edgardo Rusit	(Philippines) Grazielle Bombita	(United States) Macy Ubben (United States) Lauren Whyte
PMY	PayMaya High Flyers	PLDT, Inc.	(Philippines) Roger Gorayeb	(Philippines) Jasmine Nabor	(United States) Tess Rountree (United States) Shelby Sullivan
PGZ	Petro Gazz Angels	Petro Gazz Ventures Phils Corp	(Philippines) Jerry Yee	(Philippines) Stephanie Mercado	(Ukraine) Anastasia Trach (Ukraine) Olena Lymareva-Flink (Estonia) Kadi Kullerkann (withdrew)
POC	Pocari Sweat–Air Force Lady Warriors	Federated Distributors, Inc.	(Philippines) Jasper Jimenez	(Philippines) Myla Pablo	(United States) Maddie Palmer (United States) Arielle Love
TAC	Tacloban Fighting Warays	Bounty Agro Ventures, Inc. (sponsor)	(Philippines) Ernesto Pamilar	(Philippines) Jovie Prado	(Thailand) Amporn Hyapha (Thailand) Patcharee Sangmuang (Thailand) Sasiwimol Sangpan (withdrew)

=== Preliminary round ===
Team standings

Pos	Team	Pld	W	L	Pts	SW	SL	SR	SPW	SPL	SPR	Qualification
1	Creamline Cool Smashers	7	6	1	19	20	4	5.000	573	482	1.189	Semifinals
2	PayMaya High Flyers	7	5	2	15	17	9	1.889	592	553	1.071	Semifinals
3	Tacloban Fighting Warays	7	4	3	10	13	14	0.929	591	622	0.950	Quarterfinals
4	Pocari–Air Force	7	3	4	10	13	15	0.867	606	594	1.020	Quarterfinals
5	Petro Gazz Angels	7	3	4	10	13	15	0.867	604	617	0.979	Quarterfinals
6	BaliPure Purest Water Defenders	7	3	4	9	13	16	0.813	642	654	0.982	Quarterfinals
7	BanKo Perlas Spikers	7	3	4	8	14	17	0.824	677	686	0.987	Quarterfinals
8	Iriga City–Navy Oragons	7	1	6	3	6	19	0.316	542	619	0.876	Quarterfinals

Source: P-4

=== Quarterfinals round ===
Team standings

Pos	Team	Pld	W	L	Pts	SW	SL	SR	SPW	SPL	SPR	Qualification
1	BanKo Perlas Spikers	5	5	0	14	15	3	5.000	345	354	0.975	Semifinals
2	Pocari–Air Force	5	4	1	11	12	7	1.714	431	423	1.019	Semifinals
3	Petro Gazz Angels	5	3	2	9	10	6	1.667	372	329	1.131	
4	BaliPure Purest Water Defenders	5	2	3	6	9	11	0.818	428	438	0.977	
5	Iriga City–Navy Oragons	5	1	4	4	8	14	0.571	461	489	0.943	
6	Tacloban Fighting Warays	5	0	5	1	2	15	0.133	318	412	0.772	

=== Final round ===
- All series are best-of-three.

Semifinals
1	Creamline Cool Smashers	0	3	3
4	Pocari–Air Force	3	1	0
2	PayMaya High Flyers	1	3	3
3	BanKo Perlas Spikers	3	2	2

Finals
Creamline Cool Smashers	3	3	–
PayMaya High Flyers	1	0	–
3rd place
BanKo Perlas Spikers	2	3	–
Pocari–Air Force	3	1	–

=== Awards ===
Award		Player	Ref.
Most Valuable Player	Finals	(Philippines) Jia Morado (Creamline)	
Most Valuable Player	Conference	(Philippines) Myla Pablo (Pocari–Air Force)	
Best Outside Spikers	1st: 2nd:	(Philippines) Alyssa Valdez (Creamline) (Philippines) Myla Pablo (Pocari–Air Force)	
Best Middle Blockers	1st: 2nd:	(Philippines) Jeanette Panaga (Pocari–Air Force) (Philippines) Mary Joy Dacoron (BanKo Perlas)	
Best Opposite Spiker		(Philippines) Michele Gumabao (Creamline)	
Best Setter		(Philippines) Jia Morado (Creamline)	
Best Libero		(Philippines) Tatan Pantone (PayMaya)	
Most Points Scored		(United States) Lakia Bright (BanKo Perlas)	
Best Foreign Guest Player		(United States) Tess Nicole Rountree (PayMaya)	

=== Final standings ===
Rank	Team
1st place, gold medalist(s)	Creamline Cool Smashers
2nd place, silver medalist(s)	PayMaya Highflyers
3rd place, bronze medalist(s)	BanKo Perlas Spikers
4	Pocari Sweat–Air Force Lady Warriors
5	Petro Gazz Angels
6	BaliPure Purest Water Defenders
7	Iriga City–Navy Oragons
8	Tacloban Fighting Warays

== Collegiate conference ==
=== Participating teams ===
2018 Premier Volleyball League Collegiate Conference (Women's Division)
Abbr.	Team	Head coach	Team captain
ADU	Adamson Lady Falcons	(United States) Airess Padda	Lea Ann Perez
CSB	Benilde Lady Blazers	(Philippines) Jerry Yee	Jewel Hannah Lai
FEU	FEU Lady Tamaraws	(Philippines) George Pascua	Kyle Negrito
SBU	San Beda Red Lionesses	(Philippines) Nemesio Gavino	Cesca Racraquin
SSC	San Sebastian Lady Stags	(Philippines) Roger Gorayeb	Joyce Santa Rita
UPH	Perpetual Lady Altas	(Philippines) Michael Cariño	Maria Aurora Blanca Tripoli
UPD	UP Lady Fighting Maroons	(Kenya) Godfrey Okumu	Ayel Estrañero
UST	UST Golden Tigresses	(Philippines) Emilio Reyes Jr.	Christine Francisco

=== Preliminary round ===
Team standings

Pos	Team	Pld	W	L	Pts	SW	SL	SR	SPW	SPL	SPR	Qualification
1	Adamson Lady Falcons	7	7	0	19	21	8	2.625	667	606	1.101	Semifinals
2	UST Golden Tigresses	7	6	1	17	19	6	3.167	607	508	1.195	Semifinals
3	FEU Lady Tamaraws	7	5	2	14	19	13	1.462	691	653	1.058	Semifinals
4	UP Lady Fighting Maroons	7	4	3	13	16	9	1.778	591	497	1.189	Semifinals
5	Benilde Lady Blazers	7	3	4	10	12	14	0.857	608	571	1.065	
6	San Beda Red Lionesses	7	2	5	7	10	17	0.588	533	601	0.887	
7	Perpetual Lady Altas	7	1	6	4	6	19	0.316	472	575	0.821	
8	San Sebastian Lady Stags	7	0	7	0	4	21	0.190	452	610	0.741	

Rules for classification: Point system: 3 points = win match in 3 or 4 sets; 2 points = win match in 5 sets; 1 point = lose match in 5 sets; 0 point = lose match in 3 or 4 sets

=== Final round ===
- All series are best-of-three.

Semifinals
1	Adamson Lady Falcons	1	3	1
4	UP Lady Fighting Maroons	3	0	3
2	UST Golden Tigresses	3	1	1
3	FEU Lady Tamaraws	1	3	3

Finals
UP Lady Fighting Maroons	3	3	–
FEU Lady Tamaraws	2	2	–
3rd place
Adamson Lady Falcons	2	3	–
UST Golden Tigresses	3	1	–

=== Awards ===
Award		Player
Most Valuable Player	Finals: Conference:	Isa Molde (UP)
Best Outside Spikers	1st: 2nd:	Isa Molde (UP); Bernadette Flora (Adamson)
Best Middle Blockers	1st: 2nd:	Celine Domingo (FEU); Aieshalaine Gannaban (UP)
Best Opposite Spiker		Eli Soyud (Adamson)
Best Setter		Mary Jane Igao (Adamson)
Best Libero		Thang Ponce (Adamson)

=== Final standings ===
Rank	Team
1st place, gold medalist(s)	UP Lady Fighting Maroons
2nd place, silver medalist(s)	FEU Lady Tamaraws
3rd place, bronze medalist(s)	Adamson Lady Falcons
4	UST Golden Tigresses
5	Benilde Lady Blazers
6	San Beda Red Lionesses
7	Perpetual Lady Altas
8	San Sebastian Lady Stags

== Open conference ==
=== Participating teams ===
2018 Premier Volleyball League Open Conference
Abbr.	Team	Company	Head coach	Team captain
ADM	Ateneo–Motolite Lady Eagles	Ateneo de Manila University / Motolite (sponsor)	(Philippines) Oliver Almadro	(Philippines) Bea de Leon
ADU	Adamson–Akari Lady Falcons	Adamson University / Akari Lighting and Technology Corporation (sponsor)	(United States) Airess Padda	(Philippines) Lea Ann Perez
BKP	BanKo Perlas Spikers	Beach Volleyball Republic / BPI Direct BanKo, Inc. (sponsor)	(Philippines) Ariel dela Cruz	(Philippines) Sue Roces
CCS	Creamline Cool Smashers	Republic Biscuit Corporation	(Thailand) Tai Bundit	(Philippines) Alyssa Valdez
IRG	Iriga City–Navy Oragons	Iriga City / Philippine Navy	(Philippines) Edgardo Rusit	(Philippines) Grazielle Bombita
PGZ	Petro Gazz Angels	PetroGazz Ventures Phils. Corp.	(Philippines) Jerry Yee	(Philippines) Stephanie Mercado
POC	Pocari Sweat–Air Force Lady Warriors	Federated Distributors, Inc.	(Philippines) Jasper Jimenez	(Philippines) Myla Pablo
TAC	Tacloban Fighting Warays	Bounty Agro Ventures, Inc. (sponsor)	(Philippines) Ernesto Pamilar	(Philippines) Jovie Prado

=== Preliminary round ===
Team standings

Pos	Team	Pld	W	L	Pts	SW	SL	SR	SPW	SPL	SPR	Qualification
1	Creamline Cool Smashers	14	11	3	34	39	13	3.000	1202	936	1.284	Semifinals
2	BanKo Perlas Spikers	14	11	3	32	35	18	1.944	1208	1105	1.093	Semifinals
3	Ateneo–Motolite Lady Eagles	14	10	4	26	31	23	1.348	1178	1162	1.014	Semifinals
4	PetroGazz Angels	14	8	6	27	33	22	1.500	1202	1142	1.053	Semifinals
5	Pocari Sweat Air Force Lady Warriors	14	7	7	22	31	27	1.148	1263	1247	1.013	
6	Tacloban Fighting Warays	14	6	8	17	25	30	0.833	1178	1167	1.009	
7	Iriga City–Navy Oragons	14	3	11	8	11	36	0.306	927	1134	0.817	
8	Adamson Lady Falcons	14	0	14	2	6	42	0.143	875	1151	0.760	

Rules for classification: Point system: 3 points = win match in 3 or 4 sets; 2 points = win match in 5 sets; 1 point = lose match in 5 sets; 0 point = lose match in 3 or 4 sets

=== Final round ===
- All series are best-of-three.

Semifinals
December 7–9
1 Creamline	3	3
4 Petro Gazz	1	1
December 7–12
2 BanKo	3	0	2
3 Ateneo-Motolite	2	3	3

Championship
December 14–16
Creamline	3	3
Ateneo-Motolite	0	0
3rd place match
December 14–16
Petro Gazz	1	0
BanKo	3	3

=== Awards ===
Award		Player	Ref.
Most Valuable Player	Finals	Jia Morado (Creamline)	
Most Valuable Player	Conference	Alyssa Valdez (Creamline)	
Best Outside Spikers	1st: 2nd:	Alyssa Valdez (Creamline); Jema Galanza (Creamline)	
Best Middle Blockers	1st: 2nd:	Maddie Madayag (Ateneo); Kathy Bersola (Perlas)	
Best Opposite Spiker		Katrina Tolentino (Ateneo)	
Best Setter		Jia Morado (Creamline)	
Best Libero		Cienne Cruz (PetroGazz)	

=== Final standings ===
Rank	Team
1st place, gold medalist(s)	Creamline Cool Smashers
2nd place, silver medalist(s)	Ateneo-Motolite Lady Eagles
3rd place, bronze medalist(s)	BanKo Perlas Spikers
4	PetroGazz Angels
5	Pocari Sweat–Air Force Lady Warriors
6	Tacloban Fighting Warays
7	Iriga City–Navy Oragons
8	Adamson–Akari Lady Falcons

2018 Premier Volleyball League Open champions

2nd title

Team Roster
Alyssa Valdez (C), Jia Morado, Jema Galanza, Risa Sato, Michele Gumabao, Pau Soriano, Melissa Gohing, Fille Cainglet–Cayetano, Paula Maninang, Coleen Bravo, Jem Gutierrez, Kyla Atienza, Alex Cabaños, Rizza Mandapat,
Head coach
Anusorn "Tai" Bundit

== Conference results ==
Conference	Champion	Runner-up	3rd	4th	5th	6th	7th	8th
Reinforced	Creamline	PayMaya	Perlas	Pocari	PetroGazz	BaliPure	Iriga–Navy	Tacloban
Collegiate	UP	FEU	Adamson	UST	Benilde	San Beda	Perpetual	San Sebastian
Open	Creamline	Ateneo–Motolite	Perlas	PetroGazz	Pocari	Tacloban	Iriga–Navy	Adamson
