= Heather Guino-o =

Filipino volleyball player (born 1997)

Personal information
- Full name: Heather Anne L. Guino-o
- Nationality: Filipino
- Born: November 27, 1997 (age 28)
- Home town: Imus, Cavite, Philippines
- Education: Far Eastern University
- Height: 1.70 m (5 ft 7 in)
- Weight: 54 kg (119 lb)

Volleyball information
- Position: Outside hitter
- Current club: Cignal HD Spikers
- Number: 4

Career
- Years: Team
- 2017: Pocari Sweat Lady Warriors
- 2018: Tacloban Fighting Warays
- 2019: Creamline Cool Smashers
- 2021: BanKo Perlas Spikers
- 2022: PLDT High Speed Hitters
- 2023: Petro Gazz Angels
- 2024–2025: Capital1 Power Spikers
- 2025–2026: Cignal HD Spikers

Heather Anne Guino-o (born November 27, 1997) is a Filipino volleyball player who last played for the Cignal Super Spikers of the Premier Volleyball League (PVL).

== Career ==
=== UAAP ===
Guino-o was a member of FEU Lady Tamaraws women's volleyball collegiate team and she became an outside hitter.

In 2019, she played her final year in the UAAP.

=== PVL ===
==== Pocari Sweat Lady Warriors ====
In 2017, she played for the Pocari Sweat Lady Warriors as an Opposite spiker.

==== Tacloban Fighting Warays ====
In 2018, she played for the Tacloban Fighting Warays in the PVL alongside Kyle Negrito, her teammate from FEU Lady Tamaraws.

==== Creamline Cool Smashers ====
In 2019, she played for the Creamline Cool Smashers where they won silver medal in the 2019 PVL Reinforced Conference and gold medal in the 2019 PVL Open Conference.

== Clubs ==
- (Philippines) Pocari Sweat Lady Warriors (2017)
- (Philippines) Tacloban Fighting Warays (2018)
- (Philippines) Creamline Cool Smashers (2019)
- (Philippines) BanKo Perlas Spikers (2021)
- (Philippines) PLDT High Speed Hitters (2022)
- (Philippines) Petro Gazz Angels (2023)
- (Philippines) Capital1 Solar Spikers (2024–2025)
- (Philippines) Cignal HD Spikers (2025–2026)

== Awards ==
=== Collegiate ===
Year	League	Season/Conference	Title	Ref
2015	SVL	Collegiate	3rd Place	
2016	UAAP	78	3rd Place	
2017	PVL	Collegiate	Runner-up	
2018	UAAP	80	Runner-up	
2018	PVL	Collegiate	Runner-up	

=== Clubs ===
Year	League	Conference	Club	Title	Ref
2017	PVL	Open	Pocari Sweat Lady Warriors	Runner-up	
2019	PVL	Reinforced	Creamline Cool Smashers	Runner-up	
2019	PVL	Open	Creamline Cool Smashers	Champions	
2023	PVL	1st All-Filipino	Petro Gazz Angels	Runner-up	
