= Tacloban Fighting Warays =

- Full name: Tacloban Fighting Warays
- Short name: Tacloban
- Nickname: Fighting Warays
- Founded: 2018
- Dissolved: 2018
- League: Premier Volleyball League (2018)

Uniforms
Home	Away

The Tacloban Fighting Warays were a women's volleyball team in the Philippines representing the province of Tacloban. The team competed in the Premier Volleyball League during the 2018 season. The team was sponsored by Chooks-to-Go.

== Rosters ==
Chooks-to-Go Tacloban Fighting Warays
Number	Player	Position	Height (m)	Birth date
2	(Philippines) Mary Anne Esguerra	Middle Blocker	1.80 m (5 ft 11 in)	April 22, 1997 (aged 21)
4	(Philippines) Heather Guino-o	Outside Hitter	1.70 m (5 ft 7 in)	November 27, 1997 (aged 20)
5	(Philippines) Kimberly Joy Luzon	Libero		
6	(Philippines) Andrea Marzan	Middle Blocker	1.80 m (5 ft 11 in)	January 10, 1995 (aged 23)
8	(Philippines) Menchie Tubiera	Outside Hitter	1.65 m (5 ft 5 in)	January 11, 1993 (aged 25)
9	(Philippines) Vira May Guillema	Setter	1.70 m (5 ft 7 in)	May 9, 1995 (aged 23)
10	(Philippines) Maria Shola May Luna Alvarez	Outside Hitter	1.70 m (5 ft 7 in)	July 11, 1997 (aged 21)
11	(Philippines) Jan Eunice Galang	Libero	1.65 m (5 ft 5 in)	November 4, 1995 (aged 22)
12	(Philippines) Kyle Negrito	Setter	1.73 m (5 ft 8 in)	December 15, 1996 (aged 21)
13	(Philippines) Zharmaine Velez	Middle Blocker	1.80 m (5 ft 11 in)	December 8, 1988 (aged 29)
14	(Philippines) Dimdim Pacres	Opposite Hitter	1.75 m (5 ft 9 in)	September 23, 1997 (aged 20)
15	(Philippines) Alina Bicar	Setter	1.68 m (5 ft 6 in)	November 17, 1998 (aged 19)
16	(Philippines) Jeannie Delos Reyes	Middle Blocker	1.77 m (5 ft 10 in)	April 10, 1994 (aged 24)
18	(Philippines) Jovie Prado (c)	Outside Hitter	1.73 m (5 ft 8 in)	July 30, 1996 (aged 22)

Coaching staff

- Head Coach:
  (Philippines) Ernesto Pamilar
- Assistant Coach:
  (Philippines) Roberto Javier
  (Thailand) Patcharee Sangmuang

Team Staff

- Team Manager:
- Trainer:
  (Philippines) Alegrio Carpio

Medical Staff

- Team Physician:
- Physical Therapist:
  (Philippines) Ariel dela Cruz

== Honors ==
Season	Conference	Title
2018	Reinforced	8th place
2018	Open	6th place

== Imports ==
Season	Number	Player	Country
2018	11	Amporn Hyapha	Thailand
2018	14	Sasiwimol Sangpan (withdrew)	Thailand
2018	19	Patcharee Sangmuang	Thailand

== Team captains ==
- (Philippines) Jovie Prado (2018)

== Coaches ==
- (Philippines) Nes Pamilar (2018)

== Notable players ==
Local players

- Alina Bicar
- Heather Guino-o
- Kyle Negrito
- Dimdim Pacres
- Jovie Prado

Foreign players

Thailand

- Amporn Hyapha
- Patcharee Sangmuang
