= Gia Day =

American professional volleyball player

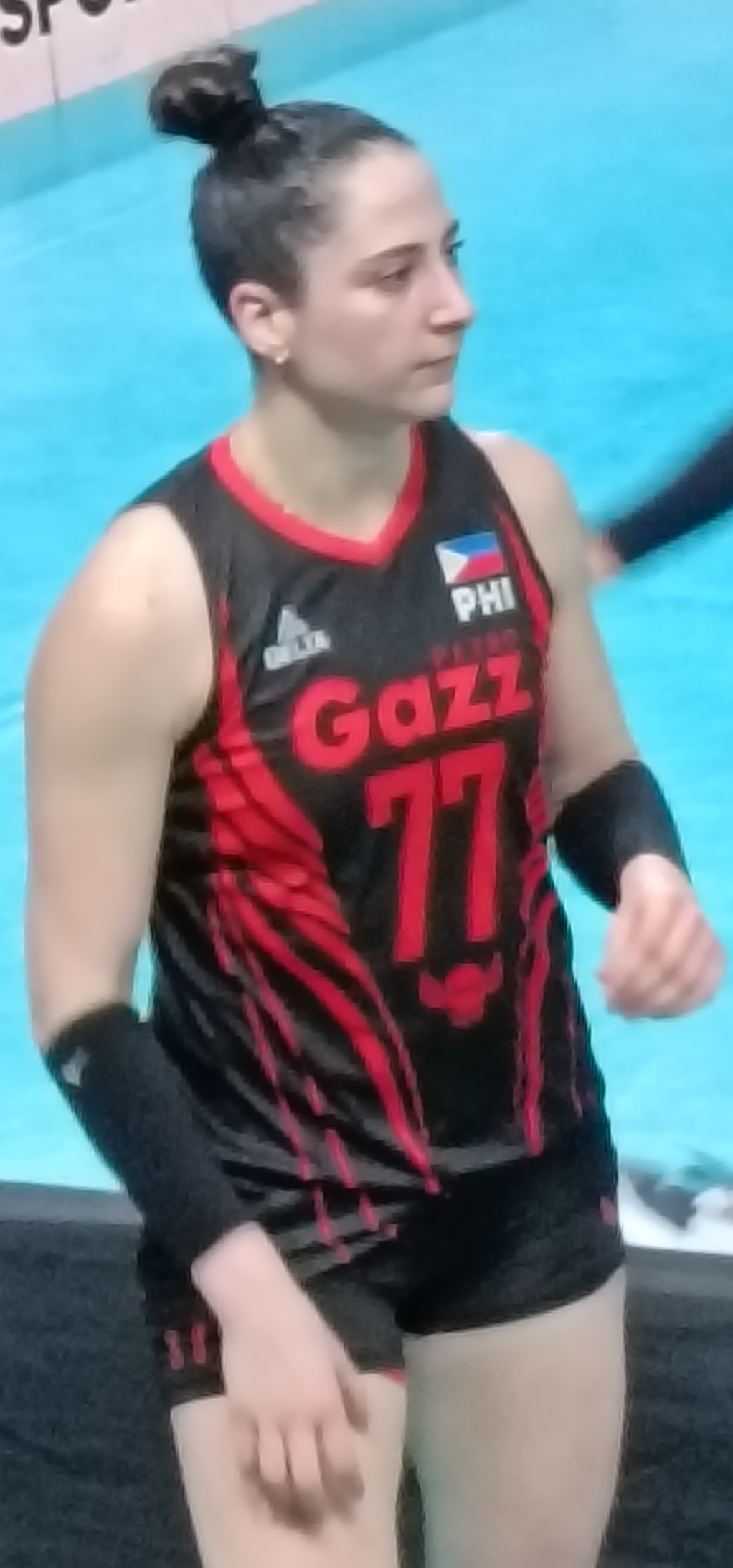
- Day with the Petro Gazz Angels in 2025

Personal information
- Full name: Giovanna Elisa Millana Day
- Nationality: United States
- Born: June 13, 1998 (age 28)
- Home town: Romeo, Michigan, U.S.
- Education: University of Maryland; Baylor University
- Height: 1.88 m (6 ft 2 in)
- Spike: 305 cm (120 in)
- Block: 282 cm (111 in)

Volleyball information
- Position: Outside hitter
- Current club: Kurobe AquaFairies Toyama
- Number: 77

Career
- Years: Team
- 2020–21: Venelles
- 2021: Sanjuaneras de la Capital
- 2021–22: Libertas Martignacco
- 2022–23: Talmassons
- 2023–24: Red Sparks
- 2024: Jakarta Pertamina Enduro
- 2024: Athletes Unlimited
- 2025: LOVB Atlanta
- 2025–: Petro Gazz Angels
- 2025–26: NEC Red Rockets Kawasaki
- 2026–: Kurobe AquaFairies Toyama
- Updated on November 2026

Giovanna Elisa Millana Day (born June 13, 1998) is an American professional volleyball player who plays for the Petro Gazz Angels of the Premier Volleyball League in the Philippines.

== Early life and education ==
Hailing from Romeo, Michigan, Gia Day was born on June 13, 1998 with Rosario and Gina Milana as her parents. She has four younger sisters. She attended Romeo High School and later the University of Maryland and Baylor University.

== Career ==
=== College ===
Day played in the U.S. National Collegiate Athletic Association (NCAA) for the Maryland Terrapins and the Baylor Bears.

=== Club ===
Prior to the start of the COVID-19 pandemic, Day started her professional career in France where she played for Pays d'Aix Venelles in the LNV Ligue A Féminine for the 2020–21 season.

In 2021, Day moved to Puerto Rico to join Sanjuaneras de la Capital before transferring to Italy to play for Libertas Martignacco in the Italian Serie A2 for the 2021–22 season. She remained in the Seria A2 but moved to Talmassons for the next season.

Day's career shifted to Asia when she joined Red Sparks in the South Korean V-League, playing alongside fellow foreign player and friend Megawati Hangestri Pertiwi. Their team finished third place in the 2023–24 season. The duo moved to Megawati's home nation of Indonesia to play in the Proliga in 2024. However Day joined a different team than Megawati suiting up for Jakarta Pertamina Enduro.

Day played in the United States for LOVB Atlanta in the League One Volleyball (LOVB) and in the Athletes Unlimited Pro League.

In April 2025, Day was brought in by the Petro Gazz Angels as an import for their upcoming stint at the 2025 AVC Women's Volleyball Champions League.

== Personal life ==
Gia is married to Daniel Day since 2021. She is of Canadian and Italian descent. She can speak in Italian and French.

== Awards ==
=== Clubs ===
- 2021 Liga de Voleibol Superior Femenino – 2nd place, with Sanjuaneras de la Capital
- 2023–24 Korean V-League – 3rd place, with Daejeon Red Sparks
