= Jia de Guzman =

Filipino volleyball player (born 1995)

Jia De Guzman
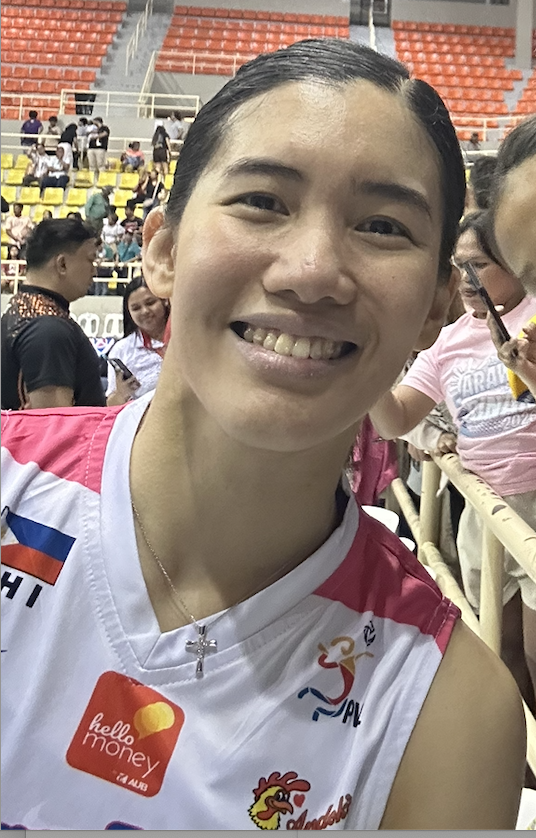

Personal information
- Full name: Julia Melissa Morado-de Guzman
- Nickname: Jia
- Nationality: Filipino
- Born: Julia Melissa Morado; May 10, 1995 (age 31)
- Home town: Parañaque, Philippines
- Education: Ateneo de Manila University
- Height: 1.70 m (5 ft 7 in)
- Weight: 55 kg (121 lb)

Coaching information
- Previous teams coached
- Years: Teams
- 2017: Ateneo Lady Eagles

Volleyball information
- Position: Setter
- Current club: Creamline Cool Smashers

Career
- Years: Team
- 2017–2023: Creamline Cool Smashers
- 2023–2025: Denso Airybees
- 2026–present: Creamline Cool Smashers

National team
- Years: Team
- 2015: Philippines U23
- 2015–present: Philippines
Honours
Women's volleyball
Representing Philippines
Asian Nations Cup
Silver medal – second place	2025 Hanoi	Team
Bronze medal – third place	2024 Manila	Team
SEA V.League
Bronze medal – third place	2019 Nakhon Ratchasima / Santa Rosa	Team
Bronze medal – third place	2024 Vĩnh Phúc / Nakhon Ratchasima	Team
Bronze medal – third place	2025 Nakhon Ratchasima / Ninh Bình	Team
Bronze medal – third place	2026 Ninh Bình	Team
Silver medal – second place	2026 Chiang Mai	Team
- Updated on September 2026

Julia Melissa "Jia" Morado-de Guzman (born May 10, 1995) is a Filipino professional volleyball player who is a setter for the Creamline Cool Smashers of the Premier Volleyball League (PVL). She was a member of the Ateneo Lady Eagles and was the team's captain in the UAAP Season 79 Women's Volleyball tournament. From 2015, Jia has been a constant member of the Philippines Women's National Volleyball Team.

== Career ==
De Guzman also played in the 2012 Palarong Pambansa and led the NCR Team to a championship, where she also won the Best Setter award.

De Guzman was the setter of the Philippine team for the 2015 Asian Women's U23 Volleyball Championship and in the 2015 Southeast Asian Games. She was Ateneo Lady Eagles team captain for the UAAP Season 79.

On May 6, 2017, De Guzman announced that she will not be returning to the Ateneo Lady Eagles in UAAP Season 80. She later joined the Creamline Cool Smashers as part of the team's build up for the inaugural Premier Volleyball League All-Filipino Conference. She worked as Ateneo Lady Eagles assistant coach during the Premier Volleyball League 1st Season Collegiate Conference.

De Guzman won the most valuable player award in the 2017 Battle of the Rivals. She won the best setter award in the 2017 Premier Volleyball League Open Conference.

In 2018, the Creamline Cool Smashers won the championship of the 2018 Premier Volleyball League Reinforced Conference and was awarded best setter and finals' Most Valuable Player. And at the end of the 2018 PVL season, De Guzman won the back-to-back championships, best setter and finals' most valuable player awards.

On August 31, 2023, De Guzman signed a deal with the Denso Airybees of the Japan V.League Division 1 as their Asian import for the 2023-2024 season. She is the first Filipina setter and the fifth Filipino player to play in the Japan V.League. On her first season overseas, she managed to help Denso Airybees finish fifth in the 2023–24 Japan V.League Division 1 Women, followed by a championship during the 2023–24 Japan V.League Division 1 Women V.Cup.

In May 2024, de Guzman became captain of the Philippines women's national volleyball team, and served in the position until September. The Philippines finished as silver medalists at the 2025 AVC Women's Volleyball Nations Cup. De Guzman was named as the tournament's Best Setter.

De Guzman returned to Creamline in January 2026 after three years of absence from the PVL.

Amidst disputes involving the PNVF, De Guzman begged off from national team duties in 2026.

== Personal life ==
Morado was born in Manila to Ariel and Hedy Morado. She has three siblings, two sisters and one brother. All the girls played varsity-level volleyball. An older sister, Jessica Katrina, who also played for the Ateneo Women's Volleyball Team from 2007 to 2012, was the one who convinced the younger Jia to pursue volleyball. Her other older sister, Jamie Marielle, played for the UST Golden Tigresses volleyball team as a libero. Her brother, Ariel Jr. "Bok", also plays volleyball as a setter for the Ateneo Blue Eagles men's volleyball team. Upon pursuing volleyball, she became a multi-awarded athlete and a full-time student at the Ateneo de Manila University where she graduated with degree of BS in Psychology. She graduated high school at the Colegio San Agustin – Makati.

She is married to Miguel de Guzman on November 11, 2021, after being in a relationship for six years. De Guzman is a businessman who was a former baseball player for De La Salle Santiago Zobel School. They both attended Ateneo de Manila University.

== Clubs ==
- (Philippines) Creamline Cool Smashers (2017–2023)
- (Japan) Denso Airybees (2023–2025)
- (Philippines) Creamline Cool Smashers (2026–present)

== Awards ==
=== Individuals ===
- 2011 NCR Volleyball Meet "Best Setter"
- 2012 BEST Center Women’s Volleyball League "Best Setter"
- 2012 Shakey’s Girls Volleyball League "Best Setter"
- 2012 NCR Palarong Panrehiyon "Best Setter"
- 2012 NCR Palarong Panrehiyon "Most Valuable Player"
- 2012 Palarong Pambansa "Best Setter"
- 2013 Shakey’s Girls Volleyball League "Best Setter"
- 2015 UAAP Season 77 "Best Setter"
- 2016 Shakey's V-League 13th Season Collegiate Conference "Best Setter"
- 2017 Battle of the Rivals "Most Valuable Player"
- 2017 Premier Volleyball League 1st Season Open Conference "Best Setter"
- 2018 Premier Volleyball League Reinforced Conference "Best Setter"
- 2018 Premier Volleyball League Reinforced Conference "Finals' Most Valuable Player"
- 2018 Premier Volleyball League Open Conference "Best Setter"
- 2018 Premier Volleyball League Open Conference "Finals' Most Valuable Player"
- 2019 Premier Volleyball League Reinforced Conference "Best Setter"
- 2019 Premier Volleyball League Open Conference "Best Setter"
- 2019 Premier Volleyball League Open Conference "Finals Most Valuable Player"
- 2021 Premier Volleyball League Open Conference "Best Setter"
- 2022 Premier Volleyball League Reinforced Conference "Best Setter"
- 2023 Premier Volleyball League All-Filipino Conference "Best Setter"
- 2023 Premier Volleyball League All-Filipino Conference "Finals Most Valuable Player"
- 2024 Asian Women's Volleyball Challenge Cup "Best Setter"
- 2024 SEA Women's V.League – First Leg "Best Setter"
- 2025 AVC Women's Volleyball Nations Cup "Best Setter"

=== Special recognition ===
- 2024 Philippine Sportswriters Association – Ms. Volleyball

=== Collegiate ===
- 2014 UAAP Season 76 volleyball tournaments – Champions, with Ateneo De Manila University Lady Eagles
- 2014 Shakey's V-League 12th Season Collegiate Conference – Silver medal, with Ateneo De Manila University Lady Eagles
- 2014 ASEAN University Games Volleyball 2014 – Bronze medal, with Ateneo De Manila University Lady Eagles
- 2015 UAAP Season 77 volleyball tournaments – Champions, with Ateneo De Manila University Lady Eagles
- 2016 UAAP Season 78 volleyball tournaments – Silver medal, with Ateneo De Manila University Lady Eagles
- 2016 Shakey's V-League 13th Season Collegiate Conference – Silver medal, with Ateneo De Manila University Lady Eagles
- 2016 ASEAN University Games Volleyball 2016 – Bronze medal, with Ateneo De Manila University Lady Eagles
- 2017 UAAP Season 79 volleyball tournaments – Silver medal, with Ateneo De Manila University Lady Eagles

=== Club ===
- 2017 Premier Volleyball League Open Conference – Third place, with Creamline Cool Smashers
- 2018 Premier Volleyball League Reinforced Conference – Champions, with Creamline Cool Smashers
- 2018 Premier Volleyball League Open Conference – Champions, with Creamline Cool Smashers
- 2019 Premier Volleyball League Reinforced Conference – Runner-up, with Creamline Cool Smashers
- 2019 Premier Volleyball League Open Conference – Champions, with Creamline Cool Smashers
- 2021 Premier Volleyball League Open Conference – Runner-up, with Creamline Cool Smashers
- 2022 Premier Volleyball League Open Conference – Champions, with Creamline Cool Smashers
- 2022 Premier Volleyball League Invitational Conference – Champions, with Creamline Cool Smashers
- 2022 Premier Volleyball League Reinforced Conference – Third place, with Creamline Cool Smashers
- 2023 Premier Volleyball League All-Filipino Conference – Champions, with Creamline Cool Smashers
- 2023 Premier Volleyball League Invitational Conference – Runner-up, with Creamline Cool Smashers
- 2023–24 Japan V.League Division 1 Women V.Cup – Champions, with Denso Airybees
- 72nd Kurowashiki All Japan Volleyball Tournament – Runner-up, with Denso Airybees
- 2026 Premier Volleyball League All-Filipino Conference - Champions, with Creamline Cool Smashers
