= Kuttika Kaewpin =

Thai volleyball player

Personal information
- Full name: Kuttika Kaewpin
- Nickname: Daw
- Nationality: Thai
- Born: August 16, 1994 (age 32); Nakhon Pathom, Thailand
- Height: 1.71 m (5 ft 7 in)
- Weight: 56 kg (123 lb)
- Spike: 294 cm (116 in)
- Block: 282 cm (111 in)

Volleyball information
- Position: Outside hitter
- Current club: Supreme Volleyball Club
- Number: 14

National team
2014, 2024–2025	Thailand
Honours
Women's volleyball
Representing Thailand
AVC Asian U18
Bronze medal – third place	2010 Kuala Lumpur	Team
SEA V. League
Gold medal – first place	2024 Vĩnh Phúc	Team

Kuttika Kaewpin (Thai: กัตติกา แก้วพิน, born August 16, 1994, in Nakhon Pathom) is a Thai indoor volleyball player. She is a current member of the Thailand women's national volleyball team.

== Club ==
- (Thailand) Nakornnont (2011–2018)
- (Indonesia) Jakarta Pertamina Energi (2015)
- (Indonesia) Jakarta Electric PLN (2016)
- (Philippines) Creamline Cool Smashers (2017–2019)
- (Indonesia) Bekasi Bina Voli Nusantara (2018)
- (Thailand) Nakhon Ratchasima (2020–2021)
- (Thailand) Diamond Food (2023–2024)
- (Vietnam) Kinh Bắc Bắc Ninh (2024, loan)
- (Vietnam) Đức Giang Chemical (2024–2025, loan)
- (Thailand) PEA Sisaket (2023–2024)
- (Maldives) Wamco (2024–2025)
- (Thailand) Supreme Volleyball Club (2025–present)

== Awards ==
=== Individuals ===
- 2012 Asian Junior Championship – "Best scorer"
- 2018–19 Thailand League – "Best scorer"
- 2018–19 Thailand League – "Best outside spiker"
- 2018–19 Thailand League – "Best server"

=== Clubs ===
- 2011 Women's Volleyball Thailand League – Champions, with Nakornnonthaburi Volleyball Club
- 2012–13 Women's Volleyball Thailand League – Runner-up, with Nakornnonthaburi Volleyball Club
- (Thailand) 2015 Women's Volleyball Thai-Denmark Super League – Runner-up, with Nakornnonthaburi Volleyball Club
- (Indonesia) 2016 Indonesian Women's Proliga – Champions, with VW Jakarta Elektrik PLN
- (Philippines) 2017 Premier Volleyball League Reinforced Conference – Bronze medal, with Creamline Cool Smashers
- (Thailand) 2017 Women's Volleyball Thai-Denmark Super League – Bronze medal, with Nakornnonthaburi Volleyball Club
- (Philippines) 2018 Premier Volleyball League Reinforced Conference – Champions, with Creamline Cool Smashers
- (Thailand) 2018 Women's Volleyball Thai-Denmark Super League – Bronze medal, with Nakornnonthaburi Volleyball Club
- 2018-19 Women's Volleyball Thailand League – Bronze medal, with Nakornnonthaburi Volleyball Club
- (Philippines) 2019 Premier Volleyball League Reinforced Conference – Runner-up, with Creamline Cool Smashers
- (Thailand) 2019 Women's Volleyball Thai-Denmark Super League – Bronze medal, with Nakornnonthaburi Volleyball Club
