= Wilma Salas =

Cuban volleyball player

Personal information
- Full name: Wilma Salas Rosell
- Nationality: Cuba
- Born: 9 March 1991 (age 35) Santiago de Cuba, Cuba
- Height: 1.88 m (6 ft 2 in)
- Weight: 65 kg (143 lb)
- Spike: 321 cm (126 in)
- Block: 309 cm (122 in)

Volleyball information
- Position: Wing Spiker / Opposite

Career
- Years: Team
- 2007-2012: Santiago de Cuba
- 2014–2015: Rabita Baku
- 2015–2016: Çanakkale Belediyespor
- 2016–2018: Halkbank Ankara
- 2018–2019: Cuneo Volley
- 2019: Petro Gazz Angels
- 2019–2021: KPS Chemik Police
- 2021–2023: Olympiacos S.F. Piraeus
- 2023–2024: Beşiktaş JK
- 2023–2024: Beşiktaş JK
- 2024: Petro Gazz Angels
- 2024–2025: Roma
- 2025: PLDT High Speed Hitters
- 2026–: Jakarta Pertamina Enduro

National team
- Years: Team
- 2010–: Cuba
Honours
Women's volleyball
Representing Cuba
Pan American Games
Silver medal – second place	2011 Guadalajara	Team

Wilma Salas Rosell (born 9 March 1991) is a Cuban female volleyball player. She was part of the Cuba women's national volleyball team. She currently plays in Indonesian Volley League for Jakarta Pertamina Enduro.

She participated at the 2010 FIVB Volleyball Women's World Championship in Japan., when she used to play with Santiago de Cuba.

== Career ==
Wilma Salas' career started at the age of 16 in Cuban championship, playing for the local team of Santiago de Cuba, where she remained until 2012. After two years of inactivity, she returned to the field in the 2014–15 season in Azerbaijan Super League, when she signed her first professional contract with Rabitə Baku, winning the championship. She also received the local sporting nationality, becoming also known as Wilma Aslihanova. In the following championship she moved to Turkey, where she defended the colors of Çanakkale, in Turkish League, also remaining there in the 2016–17 season, playing with the Halkbank Ankara shirt.

For the 2018-19 championship Wilma Salas played for Cuneo Volley, in the Italian League. Then she moved to Philippines for the end of the season, where she played in the local championship with the Petro Gazz Angels. The following season she moved to the Polish club of Chemik Police, winning one Super Cup, two Polish Cups and two league titles, although she did not play most of the 2020–21 season due to a serious knee injury, which occurred in the initial part of the championship.

In the 2021–22 season Salas returned to the field in Hellenic Volley League for Greek champions Olympiacos Piraeus.

Salas returned for Petro Gazz for the 2024 Premier Volleyball League Reinforced Conference. She was then tapped as a foreign player for the PLDT High Speed Hitters's stint at the 2025 AVC Women's Champions League.

=== International career ===
In 2008 Wilma Salas made her debut in the Cuban national team, with which a year later she became the protagonist of the 2010 world championship qualifiers, gaining access to the world championship and being awarded as the best attacker and best server of the tournament. Later that year she won the bronze medal at the 2009 North American Championship, and in 2011 she won the silver medal at the Pan American Games. In 2012 she wore the national team shirt for the last time, winning a bronze medal again, this time in the Pan-American Cup.

== Sporting achievements ==
=== National team ===
- 2010 Montreux Volley Masters
- 2011 Montreux Volley Masters
- 2011 Pan American Games
- 2012 Pan-American Cup

=== Clubs ===
==== International competitions ====
- 2015 Women's CEV Cup, with Rabita Baku
- 2016 BVA Cup with Çanakkale Belediyespor

==== National championships ====
- 2009/2010 Cuban Championship, with Santiago de Cuba
- 2010/2011 Cuban Championship, with Santiago de Cuba
- 2014/2015 Azerbaijan Championship, with Rabita Baku
- 2019/2020 Polish Championship, with Chemik Police
- 2020/2021 Polish Championship, with Chemik Police

==== National trophies ====
- 2019 Polish Super Cup, with Chemik Police
- 2020 Polish Super Cup, with Chemik Police
- 2019/2020 Polish Cup, with Chemik Police
- 2020/2021 Polish Cup, with Chemik Police

==== Individual awards ====
- 2019 Philippines - Premier Volleyball League Reinforced Conference "Best Foreign Player"
