= Iriga City Oragons =

Volleyball team representing Iriga, Camarines Sur

- Short name: Iriga City
- Nickname: Oragons
- Founded: 2017
- Dissolved: 2018
- Manager: Madelaine Alfelor–Gazmen
- Captain: Grazielle Bombita
- League: Premier Volleyball League
- 2018 Open: 7th place

The Iriga City Oragons were a women's volleyball club in the Philippines representing Iriga, Camarines Sur and owned by the city's local government. The team was established in 2016 and initially competed in the Shakey's V-League (SVL). In 2017, they moved to the Philippine Super Liga (PSL), but returned to the Sports Vision umbrella in 2018, when they moved to the Premier Volleyball League (PVL). During their PVL stint, the team partnered with the Philippine Navy.

== Final roster ==
For the 2018 Premier Volleyball League Open Conference:

Philippine Navy – Iriga City

Philippine Navy – Iriga City Oragons
No.	Name	Position	Height	Date of birth
2	(Philippines) Florence May Madulid	Outside hitter	1.73 m (5 ft 8 in)	May 10, 1990 (aged 28)
3	(Philippines) Joanne Bunag	Middle blocker	1.73 m (5 ft 8 in)	
5	(Philippines) Therese Rae Ramas			
6	(Philippines) Nerissa Bautista	Outside hitter	1.78 m (5 ft 10 in)	
7	(Philippines) Grazielle Bombita (C)	Outside hitter	1.75 m (5 ft 9 in)	February 28, 1991 (aged 27)
8	(Philippines) Shyrra Cabriana	Setter	1.60 m (5 ft 3 in)	May 7, 1994 (aged 24)
9	(Philippines) Hezzemie Acuña	Middle blocker	1.78 m (5 ft 10 in)	March 3, 1991 (aged 27)
10	(Philippines) Reynelen Raterta	Setter	1.60 m (5 ft 3 in)	October 28, 1994 (aged 23)
11	(Philippines) Nicole Brielle Guyguyon			
12	(Philippines) Christine Agno	Libero	1.58 m (5 ft 2 in)	October 15, 1993 (aged 24)
14	(Philippines) Rizalle Amaro			
15	(Philippines) Mary Jane Diane Ticar	Libero	1.57 m (5 ft 2 in)	December 14, 1992 (aged 25)
16	(Philippines) Devine Eguia	Middle blocker	1.76 m (5 ft 9 in)	July 10, 1993 (aged 25)
17	(Philippines) Carissa Yvette Martinez	Libero	1.67 m (5 ft 6 in)	July 17, 1993 (aged 25)

Head coach

- (Philippines) Edgardo Rusit

Assistant coaches

- (Philippines) Leah Ariola
- (Philippines) Cecile Cruzada

Team manager

- (Philippines) Madelaine Alfelor–Gazmen

Physical Therapist

- (Philippines) Alnasri Asiri

== Honors ==
=== Team ===
Premier Volleyball League

Season	Conference	Title	Source
2018	Reinforced	7th place	
2018	Open	7th place	

Philippine SuperLiga

Season	Conference	Title	Source
2017	Grand Prix	8th place	

== Team captains ==
- (Philippines) Reynelen Raterta (2017)
- (Philippines) Grazielle Bombita (2018)

== Coaches ==
- Parley Tupas (2017)
- Edgardo Rusit (2018)

== Imports ==
Premier Volleyball League

Season	Number	Player	Country
2018	12	Macy Ubben	(United States) USA
2018	13	Lauren Whyte	(United States) USA

Philippine Super Liga

Season	Number	Player	Country
2017	1	Tamara Kmezić	Serbia
2017	6	Samaa Miyagawa	Japan
2017	15	Minami Yoshioka	Japan

== See also ==
- Philippine Navy Fighting Stingrays
- Philippine SuperLiga
