= Jovie Prado =

Filipino volleyball player

Personal information
- Full name: Jovielyn Grace Prado
- Nickname: Jovie
- Nationality: Filipino
- Born: July 30, 1996 (age 30); Vinzons, Camarines Norte, Philippines
- Height: 170 cm (5 ft 7 in)
- Education: Arellano University

Volleyball information
- Position: Outside Hitter
- Current team: PLDT High Speed Hitters
- Number: 19

Jovielyn Grace Prado (born July 30, 1996) is a Filipino volleyball player. She is currently playing as an Outside Hitter for the PLDT High Speed Hitters in the Premier Volleyball League.

== Career ==
Prado played for the Arellano Chiefs as an Outside Hitter in the NCAA.

In 2017, she played for the United Volleyball Club in Philippine Superliga. She also played for the Power Smashers in the Premier Volleyball League where she became the captain of the team.

In 2018, she played and became the captain of Tacloban Fighting Warays in the 2018 PVL Reinforced Conference and 2018 PVL Open Conference.

In 2019, she transferred in Petro Gazz Angels where they won the 2019 PVL Reinforced Conference championship title and 2019 PVL Open Conference silver medal.

In 2021, she played for the Sta. Lucia Lady Realtors after the team transferred from PSL to PVL.

In 2022, after the Sta. Lucia Lady Realtors not joined the 2022 PVL Open Conference, Prado played for the PLDT High Speed Hitters.

== Clubs ==
- (Philippines) United Volleyball Club (2017)
- (Philippines) Power Smashers (2017–2018)
- (Philippines) Tacloban Fighting Warays (2018–2019)
- (Philippines) Petro Gazz Angels (2019–2021)
- (Philippines) Sta. Lucia Lady Realtors (2021–2022)
- (Philippines) PLDT High Speed Hitters (2022—present)

== Awards ==
=== Individuals ===
Year	League	Season/Conference	Award	Ref
2017	NCAA	92	2nd Best Outside Spiker	
2017	NCAA	92	MVP (Finals)	
2018	NCAA	93	1st Best Outside Spiker	
2019	PVL	Open	2nd Best Outside Spiker	

=== Collegiate ===
==== Arellano Lady Chiefs ====
Year	League	Season/Conference	Title	Ref
2014	NCAA	89	Runner-up	
2015	NCAA	90	Champions	
2016	NCAA	91	Runner-up	
2017	NCAA	92	Champions	
2017	PVL	Collegiate	3rd place	
2018	NCAA	93	Champions	

=== Clubs ===
Year	League	Conference	Clubs	Title	Ref
2019	PVL	Reinforced	Petro Gazz Angels	Champions	
2019	PVL	Open	Petro Gazz Angels	Runner-up	
