= Channon Thompson =

Trinidad and Tobago volleyball player (born 1994)

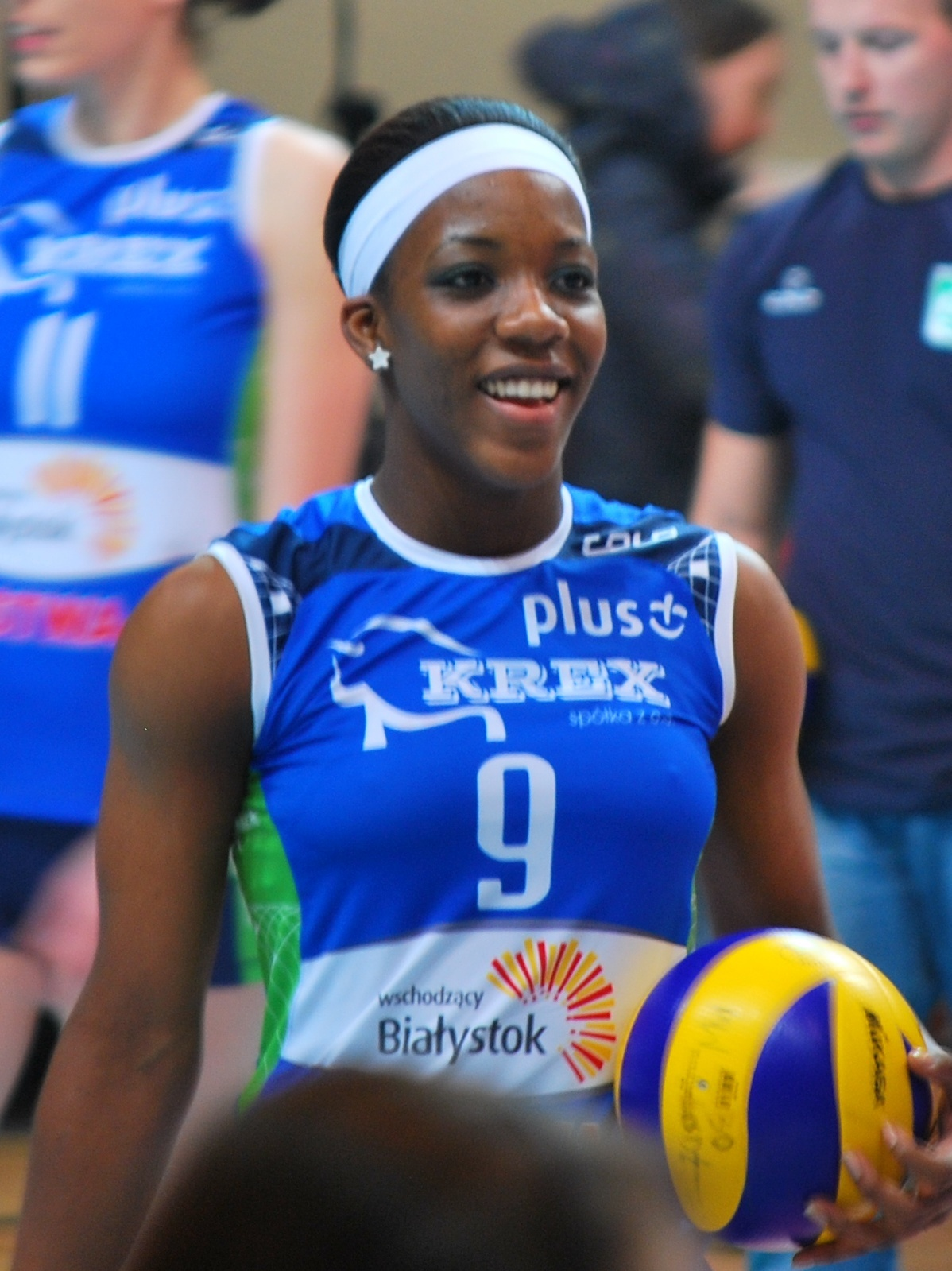
- Thompson in 2010

Personal information
- Nationality: Trinidad and Tobago
- Born: 29 March 1994 (age 32)
- Height: 190 cm (6 ft 3 in)
- Weight: 72 kg (159 lb)
- Spike: 315 cm (124 in)
- Block: 303 cm (119 in)

Volleyball information
- Position: outside hitter

Career
Years	Teams
2011	(Poland) AZS Białystok
2018	(Philippines) Foton Tornadoes
2019	(Philippines) Motolite Power Builders

National team
2009–2014	Trinidad and Tobago

Channon Thompson (born 29 March 1994) is a Trinidad and Tobago female volleyball player, playing as a s. She was part of the Trinidad and Tobago women's national volleyball team.

She participated in the 2010 Women's Pan-American Volleyball Cup, and the 2011 Women's Pan-American Volleyball Cup. On club level she played for AZS Białystok in 2011.
