= Jutarat Montripila =

Thai volleyball player (born 1986)

Personal information
- Nickname: Au
- Nationality: Thai
- Born: October 2, 1986 (age 40); Udonthani, Thailand
- Height: 1.75 m (5 ft 9 in)
- Weight: 60 kg (132 lb)
- Spike: 290 cm (114 in)
- Block: 280 cm (110 in)

Volleyball information
- Position: Outside hitter
- Current club: Nakornnonthaburi
- Number: 23 (National Team), 18 (Club)

National team
2003	Thailand-U18
2004	Thailand-U20
2014, 2019, 2021	Thailand
Honours
Women's volleyball
Representing Thailand
Asian Youth Championship
Bronze medal – third place	2003 Sisaket	Team

Jutarat Montripila (Thai: จุฑารัตน์ มูลตรีพิลา, born October 2, 1986) is a Thai indoor volleyball player. She is a member of the Thailand women's national volleyball team.

== Career ==
In 2018, she played with the local Jakarta Elektrik PLN.

She was on the 2019 list for the Korea-Thailand all star super match competition.

== Clubs ==
- (Thailand) Udon Thani (2008–2011)
- (Vietnam) PV Oil Thái Bình (2009, 2011–2012) (loan)
- (Vietnam) VTV Bình Điền Long An (2010) (loan)
- (Thailand) 3BB Nakornnont (2011–2013)
- (Thailand) Udon Thani (2013–2014)
- (Thailand) Bangkok Glass (2014–2018)
- (Philippines) BanKo Perlas Spikers (2018)
- (Thailand) Rangsit University (2018–2019)
- (Indonesia) Jakarta Elektrik PLN (2018)
- (Thailand) 3BB Nakornnont (2019–2021)

== Awards ==
=== Individual ===
- 2012–13 Thailand League – "Best spiker"

=== Clubs ===
- 2011–12 Thailand League – Champion, with Nakornnonthaburi
- 2012–13 Thailand League – Runner-up, with Nakornnonthaburi
- 2014–15 Thailand League – Champion, with Bangkok Glass
- 2015–16 Thailand League – Champion, with Bangkok Glass
- 2016–17 Thailand League – Runner-up, with Bangkok Glass
- 2015 Thai–Denmark Super League – Champion, with Bangkok Glass
- 2016 Thai–Denmark Super League – Champion, with Bangkok Glass
- 2015 Asian Club Championship – Champion, with Bangkok Glass
- 2016 Asian Club Championship – Bronze medal, with Bangkok Glass
- 2018 Premier Volleyball League (Philippines) Reinforced Conference – Bronze medal, with BanKo Perlas Spikers
