= Petro Gazz Angels =

Filipino professional women's volleyball team

- Short name: Petro Gazz
- Nickname: Angels
- Founded: May 6, 2018; 8 years ago
- Dissolved: January 10, 2026; 8 months ago
- League: Premier Volleyball League
- Championships: Premier Volleyball League: 4 (2019 Reinforced, 2022 Reinforced, 2024–25 All-Filipino, 2025 Reinforced); PNVF Champions League: 1 (2024)

Uniforms
| Home | Away |

The Petro Gazz Angels were a professional women's volleyball team playing in the Premier Volleyball League (PVL).

== History ==
The team debuted in the 2018 PVL Reinforced Conference. Petro Gazz Angels was primarily composed of former players from CSB Lady Blazers in the NCAA and DLSU Lady Spikers in the UAAP.

Petro Gazz won their first conference in the 2019 Reinforced Conference, followed by a 2022 Reinforced Conference title under coach Rald Ricafort. They often lost to the Creamline Cool Smashers in the finals.

Under Oliver Almadro, Petro Gazz finished second in the 2023 First All-Filipino Conference. However the latter half of the 2023 season, Petro Gazz's worse finish; ninth place in the Invitational under Almadro and sixth place in the Second All-Filipino Conference under Timmy Santo Tomas.

At the start of the 2024 season, the club hired Japanese coach Koji Tsuzurabara. Petro Gazz return to the podium after finishing third at the 2024 All-Filipino Conference. However in the 2024 Reinforced Conference, Creamline ended Petro Gazz' stint in the quarterfinals.

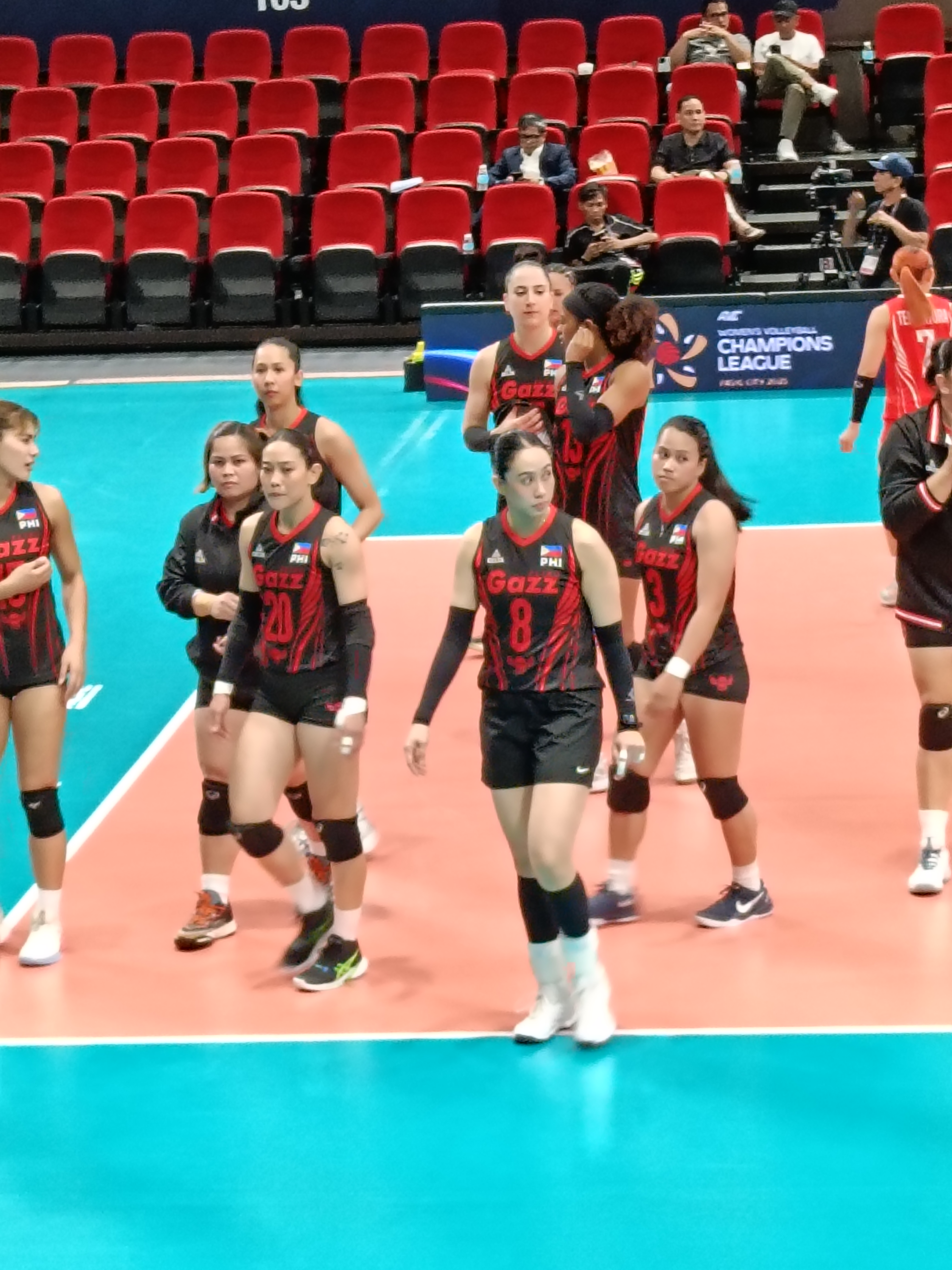
The Petro Gazz Angels during the 2025 AVC Women's Champions League

Petro Gazz took part at the 2024–25 All-Filipino Conference. As one of the top two teams in the prelimary round they qualified for the 2025 AVC Women's Volleyball Champions League. They later finished their campaign by winning their first ever All-Filipino Conference in April 2025. The team competed in the AVC tournament hosted at in Pasig within the same month. Their run ended in the quarterfinals and was eliminated by Chinese club BAIC Motor.

They were supposed to compete at the VTV Cup but was replaced by the national team.

In October 2025, Petro Gazz brought in Gary and Lisa Van Sickle as head coach and assistant coach respectively aiming for a more "American-style of play". The couple are parents of player Brooke Van Sickle. The team went on to obtain their fourth overall title by winning the 2025 Reinforced Conference.

On January 7, 2026, the PVL blocked a merger of Petro Gazz with the Nxled Chameleons with the former could be potentially be disbanded rather than formally merged to the latter.

On January 10, 2026, the team officially filed a leave of absence from the league after seven successful years with a total of 4 PVL trophies, 3 runner-up finishes, and 2 bronze finishes, citing financial concerns. Team manager David Dichupa clarified however that the team is not yet technically dissolved and it has a "very big chance" to return to the PVL.

== Rivalry with Creamline ==
Petro Gazz was involved in a rivalry with the Creamline Cool Smashers. Despite the latter's dominance, Petro Gazz won two of their three league championships against Creamline.

== Honors ==
=== Team ===
Premier Volleyball League:

| Season | Conference | Title | Source |
|---|---|---|---|
| 2018 | Reinforced | 5th place | |
| 2018 | Open | 4th place | |
| 2019 | Reinforced | Champions | |
| 2019 | Open | Runner-up | |
| 2021 | Open | 3rd place | |
| 2022 | Open | Runner-up | |
| 2022 | Invitational | 6th place | |
| 2022 | Reinforced | Champions | |
| 2023 | 1st All-Filipino | Runner-up | |
| 2023 | Invitational | 9th place | |
| 2023 | 2nd All-Filipino | 6th place | |
| 2024–25 | 2024 All-Filipino | 3rd place | |
| 2024–25 | Reinforced | 6th place | |
| 2024–25 | 2024–25 All-Filipino | Champions | |
| 2025–26 | PVL on Tour | 9th place | |
| 2025–26 | Reinforced | Champions | |

PNVF Champions League:

| Season | Title | Source |
|---|---|---|
| 2021 | 3rd place | |
| 2024 | Champions | |

AVC Women's Volleyball Champions League:

| Season | Title | Source |
|---|---|---|
| 2025 | 6th place | |

=== Individual ===
| Season | Conference | Award | Name | Ref. |
|---|---|---|---|---|
| 2018 | Open | Best Libero | (Philippines) Cienne Marie Arielle Cruz | |
| 2019 | Reinforced | 2nd Best Middle Blocker | (Philippines) Cherry Rose Nunag | |
| 2019 | Reinforced | Best Foreign Guest Player | (Cuba) Wilma Salas | |
| 2019 | Reinforced | Most Valuable Player (Finals) | (United States) Janisa Johnson | |
| 2019 | Open | 1st Best Outside Spiker | (Philippines) Jovielyn Grace Prado | |
| 2019 | Open | 2nd Best Middle Blocker | (Philippines) Jeanette Panaga | |
| 2021 | Open | 2nd Best Outside Spiker | (Philippines) Myla Pablo | |
| 2021 | Open | 1st Best Middle Blocker | (Philippines) Ria Meneses | |
| 2021 | Open | Best Libero | (Philippines) Kath Arado | |
| 2021 | PNVF Champions League for Women | 1st Best Outside Spiker | (Philippines) Frances Molina | |
| 2022 | Open | 2nd Best Outside Spiker | (Philippines) Grethcel Soltones | |
| 2022 | Reinforced | 2nd Best Outside Spiker | (Philippines) Myla Pablo | |
| 2022 | Reinforced | 1st Best Middle Blocker | (Philippines) (United States) MJ Phillips | |
| 2022 | Reinforced | Best Foreign Guest Player | (United States) Lindsey Vander Weide | |
| 2022 | Reinforced | Most Valuable Player (Finals) | (United States) Lindsey Vander Weide | |
| 2023 | 1st All-Filipino | 1st Best Middle Blocker | (Philippines) Mary Remy Joy Palma | |
| 2023 | 1st All-Filipino | 2nd Best Middle Blocker | (Philippines) (United States) MJ Phillips | |
| 2024 | PNVF Champions League for Women | | | |
| 2024 | PNVF Champions League for Women | Most Valuable Player | (Philippines) (United States) Brooke Van Sickle | |
| 2024 | PNVF Champions League for Women | 1st Best Outside Spiker | (Philippines) (United States) Brooke Van Sickle | |
| 2024 | PNVF Champions League for Women | 2nd Best Outside Spiker | (Philippines) Jonah Sabete | |
| 2024 | PNVF Champions League for Women | 2nd Best Middle Blocker | (Philippines) Mary Remy Joy Palma | |
| 2024–25 | 2024 All-Filipino | | | |
| 2024–25 | 2024 All-Filipino | Most Valuable Player (Conference) | (Philippines) (United States) Brooke Van Sickle | |
| 2024–25 | 2024 All-Filipino | Best Opposite Spiker | (Philippines) Aiza Maizo-Pontillas | |
| 2024–25 | Reinforced | 1st Best Outside Spiker | (Philippines) (United States) Brooke Van Sickle | |
| 2024–25 | 2024–25 All-Filipino | | | |
| 2024–25 | 2024–25 All-Filipino | Most Valuable Player (Conference) | (Philippines) (United States) Brooke Van Sickle | |
| 2024–25 | 2024–25 All-Filipino | Most Valuable Player (Finals) | (Philippines) (United States) MJ Phillips | |
| 2025–26 | PVL on Tour | | | |
| 2025–26 | PVL on Tour | 2nd Best Outside Spiker | (Philippines) Myla Pablo | |
| 2025–26 | Reinforced | Most Valuable Player (Conference) | (Philippines) (United States) Brooke Van Sickle | |
| 2025–26 | Reinforced | 1st Best Outside Spiker | (Philippines) (United States) Brooke Van Sickle | |
| 2025–26 | Reinforced | Most Valuable Player (Finals) | (Philippines) (United States) MJ Phillips | |

== Team captains ==
- (Philippines) Stephanie Mercado (2018)
- (United States) Janisa Johnson (2019)
- (Philippines) Chie Saet (2019–2023)
- (Philippines) Remy Palma (2024–2025)

== Imports ==
| Season | Name | Country |
|---|---|---|
| 2018 | Kadi Kullerkann (Note: Olena Lymareva-Flink replaced Kadi Kullerkann in the latter stage of the preliminary round.) | Estonia |
| 2018 | Anastasia Trach | Ukraine |
| 2018 | Olena Lymareva-Flink | Ukraine |
| 2019 | Wilma Salas | Cuba |
| 2019 | Janisa Johnson | United States |
| 2022 | Lindsey Vander Weide | United States |
| 2024 | Wilma Salas | Cuba |
| 2025 AVC CL | Gia Day | United States |
| 2025 | Lindsey Vander Weide | United States |

== Coaches ==
- (Philippines) Jerry Yee (2018, 2022)
- (Philippines) Arnold Laniog (2019–2021)
- (Philippines) Rald Ricafort (2022)
- (Philippines) Oliver Almadro (2023 1st All-Filipino–Invitational) – elevated as the team's head of volleyball operations
- (Philippines) Timmy Santo Tomas – (2023 2nd All-Filipino)
- (Japan) Koji Tsuzurabara (2024–2025)
- (Philippines) Brian Esquibel (interim; 2025)
- (United States) Gary Van Sickle (2025)

== Former players ==
Local players

- Aiza Maizo-Pontillas (2022-2025)
- Antonnette Adolfo
- Baby Love Barbon
- Brooke Van Sickle
- Chie Saet (2018-2025)
- Cienne Cruz
- Cherry Nunag (2019)
- Djanel Welch Cheng
- Donnalyn Paralejas
- Dzi Gervacio
- Frances Molina (2021)
- Grethcel Soltones (2021-2023)
- Heather Guino-o
- Jeanette Panaga (2019)
- Jeushl Wensh Tiu
- Jellie Tempiatura
- Jonah Sabete (2022-2025)
- Jovelyn Grace Prado
- Julyana Tolentino
- Kath Arado (2021)
- Kecelyn Galdones
- Lourdes Clemente-De Guzman
- MJ Phillips (2022-2025)
- Mary Anne Mendrez
- Mary Joy Dacoron
- Michelle Morente
- Myla Pablo (2021-2022, 2024-2025)
- Nicole Anne Tiamzon (2022-2025)
- Rachel Anne Austero
- Ranya Musa
- Remy Palma (2021-2025)
- Ria Meneses (2021)
- Rica Jane Enclona
- Seth Rodriguez
- Stephanie Mercado-De Koenigswarter

Foreign players

Cuba

- Wilma Salas

Estonia

- Kadi Kullerkann

Ukraine

- Olena Lymareva-Flink
- Anastasiya Trach

United States

- Janisa Johnson
- Lindsay Vander Weide
- Giovanna Day - AVC Women’s Champions League 2025

== Drafts ==
| Season | Pick No. | Name |
|---|---|---|
| 2024 | 10 | Antonette Adolfo |
| 2024 | 18 | Donnalyn Paralejas |
| 2025 | 11 | Julyana Tolentino |
