= Janisa Johnson =

American volleyball player (1991–2024)

Personal information
- Full name: Janisa Ivette Johnson
- Born: September 22, 1991
- Died: May 25, 2024 (aged 32)
- Hometown: Long Beach, California, U.S.
- Height: 173 cm (5 ft 8 in)
- Education: California State University, Long Beach

Volleyball information
- Position: Outside hitter

Career
Years	Teams
2010–15	CSU Long Beach
2015–16	Köpenicker SC Berlin
2016–17	Oriveden Ponnistus
2018	BaliPure–NU Water Defenders
2018–19	Béziers Angels
2019	Petro Gazz Angels
2020–21	Radomka Radom
2022	CD Heidelberg

Janisa Ivette Johnson (September 22, 1991 – May 25, 2024) was an American volleyball player.

== Early life and education ==
Johnson was born on September 22, 1991. Long Beach, California was her hometown. She attended Wilson High School and California State University, Long Beach.

== Career ==
Janisa Johnson was a player for Wilson High School's volleyball team. She also started for California State University, Long Beach (CSU).

After graduating from CSU in 2013, Johnson plied her trade in Europe. She joined Köpenicker SC in Germany in 2015 before playing in Finland, France, Poland, and Spain. She also played in Asia, specifically in the Philippines.

In Finland she played for Orividen Ponnitus.

=== BaliPure ===
She played in the Premier Volleyball League (PVL) in the Philippines from 2018 to 2019 where she played as an import, or foreign player. She debuted in the PVL with the BaliPure–NU Water Defenders at the 2018 Reinforced Conference.

=== Béziers Volley ===
She played and won a championship for Béziers Angels in France's LNV Ligue A Féminine. She played from September 2018 to May 2019.

=== Petro Gazz ===
After her brief stint in France, Johnson returned to the PVL in the Philippines and helped the Petro Gazz Angels clinch the title for that season's Reinforced Conference and was named the final's MVP. This was her club's first PVL title.

=== Radomka Radom ===
After playing in the Philippines, Johnson returned to Europe and signed with Polish club Radomka Radom of the Polish Women's Volleyball League. In March 2021, Johnson became unavailable for the rest of the 2020–21 season due to a colon cancer diagnosis.

=== CD Heidelberg ===
After undergoing cancer treatment, Johnson briefly returned, signing a contract with Spanish club CD Heidelberg in August 2022.

== Personal life ==
Johnson was of Hispanic descent.

=== Illness and death ===
In 2021, Johnson was diagnosed with colon cancer, for which she underwent chemotherapy. In August 2022, she recovered enough to play competitive volleyball again.

Johnson died on May 25, 2024 at the age of 32.

== Awards ==
=== Individuals ===
- 2019 Premier Volleyball League Reinforced Conference "Finals Most Valuable Player"

=== Clubs ===
- 2018 LNV Ligue A Féminine – Champions, with Béziers Angels
- 2019 Premier Volleyball League Reinforced Conference – Champions, with Petro Gazz Angels
