= 2019 Premier Volleyball League Reinforced Conference =

First conference of the 2019 PVL season

- Duration: May 26 – July 14, 2019
- Teams: 6
- Matches: 40
- Attendance: 56,834 (1,421 per match)
- TV partner(s): S+A; Liga

Results
- Champions: Petro Gazz Angels
- Runners-up: Creamline Cool Smashers
- Third place: PacificTown–Army Lady Troopers
- Fourth place: BanKo Perlas Spikers

Awards
- Conference MVP: Alyssa Valdez
- Finals MVP: Janisa Johnson
- Best OH: Alyssa Valdez; Nicole Tiamzon
- Best MB: Kathy Bersola; Cherry Nunag
- Best OPP: Dzi Gervacio
- Best Setter: Jia Morado
- Best Libero: Anngela Nunag

PVL Reinforced Conference chronology
- < 2018 2022 >

PVL conference chronology
- < 2018 Open 2019 Open >

The 2019 Premier Volleyball League Reinforced Conference was the seventh conference of the Premier Volleyball League and the first of the 2019 season. The conference started on May 26, 2019. Grand Fans Day was held at the Trinoma Activity Center, Quezon City on April 25, 2019. Games were held at the Filoil Flying V Centre, San Juan, Philippines. Philippine Army returned as Pacific Town-Army Lady Troopers, and Motolite Power Builders returned with a new set of players.

== Participating teams ==
2019 Premier Volleyball League Reinforced Conference
Abbr.	Team	Affiliation	Head coach	Team captain	Imports
BLP	BaliPure Purest Water Defenders	Balibago Waterworks System, Inc.	(Philippines) Rommel Abella	(Philippines) Grazielle Bombita	(Montenegro) Danijela Dzakovic (Slovakia) Alexandra Vajdovä
BPS	BanKo Perlas Spikers	Beach Volleyball Republic / BPI Direct BanKo, Inc.	(Thailand) Apichat Kongsawat	(Philippines) Nicole Tiamzon	(Thailand) Sutadta Chuewulim (United States) Jeane Mae Horton (United States) Lakia Bright (replaced)^{a} (Turkey) Yasemin Yildirim (replaced)^{b}
CCS	Creamline Cool Smashers	Republic Biscuit Corporation	(Thailand) Tai Bundit	(Philippines) Alyssa Valdez	(Venezuela) Aleoscar Blanco (Thailand) Kuttika Kaewpin
MOT	Motolite Power Builders	Philippine Batteries Inc.	(United States) Airess Padda	(Philippines) Myla Pablo	(Bosnia and Herzegovina) Edina Selimovic (replaced)^{c} (Trinidad and Tobago) Krystle Esdelle (Trinidad and Tobago) Channon Thompson
PGZ	Petro Gazz Angels	PetroGazz Ventures Phils. Corp.	(Philippines) Arnold Laniog	(United States) Janisa Johnson	(Cuba) Wilma Salas (United States) Janisa Johnson
PTA	PacificTown–Army Lady Troopers	PacificTown Property Ventures Inc. and Philippine Army	(Philippines) Kungfu Reyes	(Philippines) Ging Balse	(Ukraine) Olena Lymareva-Flink (United States) Jenelle Jordan

Notes:

a.Chuewulim replaced Bright.
b.Yildirim was replaced by Horton during the semis.
c.Selimovic was replaced by Esdelle due to injury.

== Venues ==
- Filoil Flying V Centre, San Juan (main venue)
- University of San Agustin, Iloilo City (PVL on tour)
- Imus City Sports Complex, Cavite (PVL on tour)
- Alonte Sports Arena, Biñan, Laguna (PVL on tour)
- Ynares Center, Antipolo, Rizal (PVL on tour)

== Foreign guest players ==
Team	Foreign player	Height	Moving from
BaliPure Purest Water Defenders	(Montenegro) Danijela Dzakovic	1.75 m (5 ft 9 in)	(Slovenia) OK Formis
BaliPure Purest Water Defenders	(Slovakia) Alexandra Vajdovä	1.82 m (6 ft 0 in)	(Belgium) Volley Saturnus Michelbeke
BanKo Perlas Spikers	(Thailand) Sutadta Chuewulim	1.73 m (5 ft 8 in)	(Thailand) Air Force Women's Volleyball Club
BanKo Perlas Spikers	(United States) Jeane Mae Horton	1.77 m (5 ft 10 in)	(Philippines) Cignal HD Spikers
BanKo Perlas Spikers	(United States) Lakia Jamiah Bright (replaced)	1.80 m (5 ft 11 in)	(Finland) LP Vampula
BanKo Perlas Spikers	(Turkey) Yasemin Sahin Yildirim (replaced)	1.90 m (6 ft 3 in)	(Turkey) Çanakkale Belediyespor
Creamline Cool Smashers	(Venezuela) Aleoscar Blanco	1.89 m (6 ft 2 in)	(Peru) Regatas Lima
Creamline Cool Smashers	(Thailand) Kuttika Kaewpin	1.71 m (5 ft 7 in)	(Indonesia) Bekasi Bina Voli Nusantara
Motolite Power Builders	(Bosnia and Herzegovina) Edina Selimovic (replaced)	1.86 m (6 ft 1 in)	(Bosnia and Herzegovina) ŽOK Smeč
Motolite Power Builders	(Trinidad and Tobago) Channon Thompson	1.90 m (6 ft 3 in)	(Germany) Rote Raben Vilsbiburg
Motolite Power Builders	(Trinidad and Tobago) Krystle Esdelle	1.90 m (6 ft 3 in)	(Turkey) Pursaklar
Petro Gazz Angels	(Cuba) Wilma Salas	1.88 m (6 ft 2 in)	(Italy) Bosca San Bernardo Cuneo
Petro Gazz Angels	(United States) Janisa Johnson	1.73 m (5 ft 8 in)	(France) Béziers Volley
PacificTown–Army Lady Troopers	(Ukraine) Olena Lymareva-Flink	1.82 m (6 ft 0 in)	(Finland) LP Viesti
PacificTown–Army Lady Troopers	(United States) Jenelle Jordan	1.87 m (6 ft 2 in)	(United States) University of California

== Format ==
Preliminary round

1. The six teams compete in a double round-robin elimination.
2. Teams are ranked using the FIVB Ranking System.
3. Top four teams will advance to the semifinals.

Semifinals

1. Best-of-three series.
2. 1st ranked team vs. 4th ranked team
3. 2nd ranked team vs. 3rd ranked team

Finals

1. Best-of-three series.
2. Bronze medal: SF1 Loser vs. SF2 Loser
3. Gold medal: SF1 Winner vs. SF2 Winner

== Pool standing procedure ==
- First, teams are ranked by the number of matches won.
- If the number of matches won is tied, the tied teams are then ranked by match points, wherein:
  - Match won 3–0 or 3–1: 3 match points for the winner, 0 match points for the loser.
  - Match won 3–2: 2 match points for the winner, 1 match point for the loser.
- In case of any further ties, the following criteria shall be used:
  - Set ratio: the number of sets won divided by number of sets lost.
  - Point ratio: number of points scored divided by number of points allowed.
  - Head-to-head standings: any remaining tied teams are ranked based on the results of head-to-head matches involving the teams in question.

== Preliminary round ==
=== Ranking ===
Pos	Team	Pld	W	L	Pts	SW	SL	SR	SPW	SPL	SPR	Qualification
1	PetroGazz Angels	10	9	1	27	28	4	7.000	792	624	1.269	Semifinals
2	Creamline Cool Smashers	10	9	1	27	27	7	3.857	817	673	1.214	Semifinals
3	PacificTown–Army Lady Troopers	10	5	5	15	18	19	0.947	818	817	1.001	Semifinals
4	BanKo Perlas Spikers	10	4	6	12	16	21	0.762	776	858	0.904	Semifinals
5	Motolite Power Builders	10	3	7	8	13	25	0.520	809	856	0.945	
6	BaliPure Purest Water Defenders	10	0	10	1	4	30	0.133	649	833	0.779	

=== Match results ===
- All times are in Philippines Standard Time (UTC+08:00)

Date	Time		Score		Set 1	Set 2	Set 3	Set 4	Set 5	Total	Report
May 26	14:00	PacificTown–Army Lady Troopers	3–1	BaliPure Purest Water Defenders	25–20	25–16	24–26	25–23		99–85	P–2
May 26	16:00	Petro Gazz Angels	3–0	Creamline Cool Smashers	25–22	26–24	25–22			76–68	P–2
May 29	15:00	Creamline Cool Smashers	3–0	PacificTown–Army Lady Troopers	25–21	25–16	25–18			75–55	P–2
May 29	17:00	BanKo Perlas Spikers	0–3	Petro Gazz Angels	19–25	21–25	12–25			52–75	P–2
Jun 01	14:00	BaliPure Purest Water Defenders	1–3	BanKo Perlas Spikers	23–25	25–23	18–25	16–25		82–98	P–2
Jun 01	16:00	PacificTown–Army Lady Troopers	3–1	Motolite Power Builders	25–21	25–21	23–25	25–21		98–88	P–2
Jun 02	14:00	Motolite Power Builders	0–3	Petro Gazz Angels	22–25	18–25	19–25			59–75	P–2
Jun 02	16:00	BanKo Perlas Spikers	1–3	Creamline Cool Smashers	25–23	12–25	17–25	23–25		77–98	P–2
Jun 05	15:00	Petro Gazz Angels	3–0	BaliPure Purest Water Defenders	25–19	25–12	25–15			75–46	P–2
Jun 05	17:00	Motolite Power Builders	0–3	BanKo Perlas Spikers	24–26	30–32	24–26			78–84	P–2
Jun 08	14:00	PacificTown–Army Lady Troopers	0–3	Petro Gazz Angels	12–25	27–29	15–25			54–79	P–2
Jun 08	16:00	Creamline Cool Smashers	3–1	Motolite Power Builders	13–25	25–19	25–16	25–23		88–83	P–2
Jun 09	14:00	BanKo Perlas Spikers	2–3	PacificTown–Army Lady Troopers	22–25	25–23	29–27	20–25	7–15	103–115	P–2
Jun 09	16:00	Motolite Power Builders	3–0	BaliPure Purest Water Defenders	25–16	25–21	25–18			75–55	P–2
Jun 12	16:00	Creamline Cool Smashers	3–0	BaliPure Purest Water Defenders	25–19	25–18	25–23			75–60	P–2
Jun 12	18:00	Petro Gazz Angels	3–1	BanKo Perlas Spikers	25–23	25–11	22–25	25–20		97–79	P–2
Jun 15	16:00	BanKo Perlas Spikers	0–3	Creamline Cool Smashers	12–25	19–25	16–25			47–75	P–2
Jun 16	14:00	BaliPure Purest Water Defenders	0–3	Petro Gazz Angels	19–25	22–25	18–25			59–75	P–2
Jun 16	16:00	Motolite Power Builders	3–2	PacificTown–Army Lady Troopers	25–23	21–25	17–25	25–21	15–13	103–107	P–2
Jun 19	16:00	BaliPure Purest Water Defenders	0–3	PacificTown–Army Lady Troopers	21–25	20–25	21–25			62–75	P–2
Jun 19	18:00	Creamline Cool Smashers	3–0	Motolite Power Builders	25–15	25–21	25–23			75–59	P–2
Jun 22	14:00	Motolite Power Builders	3–2	BaliPure Purest Water Defenders	23–25	23–25	25–14	25–14	15–12	111–90	P–2
Jun 22	16:00	Petro Gazz Angels	1–3	Creamline Cool Smashers	18–25	25–21	19–25	24–26		86–97	P–2
Jun 23	14:00	BanKo Perlas Spikers	3–2	Motolite Power Builders	19–25	23–25	25–18	25–22	17–15	109–105	P–2
Jun 23	16:00	PacificTown–Army Lady Troopers	0–3	Petro Gazz Angels	27–29	20–25	14–25			61–79	P–2
Jun 26	16:00	PacificTown–Army Lady Troopers	1–3	Creamline Cool Smashers	25–16	16–25	22–25	16–25		79–91	P–2
Jun 26	18:00	BaliPure Purest Water Defenders	0–3	BanKo Perlas Spikers	18–25	19–25	21–25			58–75	P–2
Jun 29	14:00	BanKo Perlas Spikers	0–3	PacificTown–Army Lady Troopers	18–25	14–25	20–25			52–75	P–2
Jun 29	16:00	Creamline Cool Smashers	3–0	BaliPure Purest Water Defenders	25–19	25–15	25–18			75–52	P–2
Jun 29	18:00	Motolite Power Builders	0–3	Petro Gazz Angels	19–25	15–25	15–25			49–75	P–2P–4

== Final round ==
- All times are Philippine Standard Time (UTC+8:00).
- All are best-of-three series.

Semifinals
March 18–21
1 Petro Gazz	3	3
4 BanKo	1	0
March 18–21
2 Creamline	3	3
3 PacificTown–Army	1	0

Championship
March 26–30
Petro Gazz	1	3	3
Creamline	3	1	1
3rd place match
March 26–30
BanKo	3	1	2
PacificTown–Army	2	3	3

=== Semifinals ===
Rank 1 vs Rank 4

- Petro Gazz wins series, 2–0

Date	Time		Score		Set 1	Set 2	Set 3	Set 4	Set 5	Total	Report
Jul 03	17:00	Petro Gazz Angels	3–1	BanKo Perlas Spikers	25–19	25–15	21–25	25–12		96–71	P–2
Jul 06	15:00	BanKo Perlas Spikers	0–3	Petro Gazz Angels	23–25	18–25	17–25			58–75	P–2

Rank 2 vs Rank 3

- Creamline wins series, 2–0

Date	Time		Score		Set 1	Set 2	Set 3	Set 4	Set 5	Total	Report
Jul 03	15:00	Creamline Cool Smashers	3–1	PacificTown–Army Lady Troopers	26–24	25–21	23–25	25–20		99–90	P–2
Jul 06	17:00	PacificTown–Army Lady Troopers	0–3	Creamline Cool Smashers	12–25	18–25	13–25			43–75	P–2

=== Finals ===
3rd Place

- PacificTown-Army wins series, 2–1

Date	Time		Score		Set 1	Set 2	Set 3	Set 4	Set 5	Total	Report
Jul 10	15:00	PacificTown–Army Lady Troopers	2–3	BanKo Perlas Spikers	27–25	25–10	25–27	24–26	14–16	115–104	P–2
Jul 13	14:00	BanKo Perlas Spikers	1–3	PacificTown–Army Lady Troopers	23–25	25–20	20–25	23–25		91–95	P–2
Jul 14	14:00	PacificTown–Army Lady Troopers	3–2	BanKo Perlas Spikers	18–25	25–16	20–25	25–15	15–13	103–94	P–2

Championships

- Petro Gazz wins series, 2–1

Date	Time		Score		Set 1	Set 2	Set 3	Set 4	Set 5	Total	Report
Jul 10	17:00	Petro Gazz Angels	1–3	Creamline Cool Smashers	26–24	16–25	16–25	22–25		80–99	P–2
Jul 13	16:00	Creamline Cool Smashers	1–3	Petro Gazz Angels	25–15	22–25	22–25	12–25		81–90	P–2
Jul 14	16:00	Petro Gazz Angels	3–1	Creamline Cool Smashers	25–15	28–30	25–23	25–19		103–87	P–2

== Awards ==
Award	Player	Team	Ref.
Conference Most Valuable Player	Alyssa Valdez	Creamline	
Finals Most Valuable Player	Janisa Johnson	Petro Gazz	
1st Best Outside Spiker	Alyssa Valdez	Creamline	
2nd Best Outside Spiker	Nicole Tiamzon	BanKo Perlas	
1st Best Middle Blocker	Kathy Bersola	BanKo Perlas	
2nd Best Middle Blocker	Cherry Rose Nunag	Petro Gazz	
Best Opposite Spiker	Dzi Gervacio	BanKo Perlas	
Best Setter	Jia Morado	Creamline	
Best Libero	Anngela Nunag	PacificTown–Army	
Best Foreign Guest Player	Wilma Salas	Petro Gazz	

== Final standings ==
Rank	Team
1st place, gold medalist(s)	Petro Gazz Angels
2nd place, silver medalist(s)	Creamline Cool Smashers
3rd place, bronze medalist(s)	PacificTown-Army Lady Troopers
4	BanKo Perlas Spikers
5	Motolite Power Builders
6	BaliPure Purest Water Defenders

2019 Premier Volleyball League Reinforced champions

1st title

Team roster
Janisa Johnson (C), Cherry Rose Nunag, Djanel Welch Cheng, Jessey de Leon, Stephanie Mercado, Relea Ferina Saet, Jeanette Panaga, Maricar Nepomuceno-Baloaloa, Wilma Salas, Alyssa Gayle Layug, Jonah Sabete, Rica Jane Enclona (L), Cienne Mary Arielle Cruz (L), Jovielyn Grace Prado
Head coach
Arnold Laniog

== Statistics leaders ==
=== Individual statistics ===
Below are the top player tournament averages per skill

Best scorers

Rank	Name	Points
1	Channon Thompson	214
2	Wilma Salas	212
3	Olena Lymareva-Flink	186
4	Janisa Johnson	183
5	Kuttika Kaewpin	154

Best spikers

Rank	Name	%Eff
1	Wilma Salas	47.00
2	Janisa Johnson	46.22
3	Kuttika Kaewpin	41.12
4	Channon Thompson	38.55
5	Olena Lymareva-Flink	38.32

Best blockers

Rank	Name	Avg
1	Katherine Adrielle Bersola	0.78
2	Yasemin Sahin Yildirim	0.68
3	Krystel Esdelle	0.61
4	Aleoscar Blanco	0.59
5	Jenelle Jordan	0.57

Best servers

Rank	Name	Avg
1	Alyssa Valdez	0.68
2	Channon Thompson	0.53
3	Olena Lymareva-Flink	0.51
4	Alexandra Vajdova	0.50
5	Jeanette Panaga	0.47

Best diggers

Rank	Name	Avg
1	Anngela Nunag	3.76
2	Tonnie Rose Ponce	3.50
3	Jewelle Bermillo	3.26
4	Janisa Johnson	3.19
5	Cienne Cruz	2.81

Best setters

Rank	Name	Avg
1	Julia Melissa Morado	5.94
2	Jamenea Ferrer	5.43
3	Djanel Welch Cheng	4.97
4	Vira May Guillema	2.91
5	Alina Joyce Bicar	2.81

Best receivers

Rank	Name	%Succ
1	Kuttika Kaewpin	49.34
2	Janisa Johnson	48.26
3	Wilma Salas	47.09
4	Tonnie Rose Ponce	45.20
5	Cienne Cruz	37.65

=== Team statistics ===
Below are the team tournament averages per skill

Best spikers

Rank	Name	%Eff
1	Petro Gazz	41.19
2	Creamline	37.87
3	PacificTown-Army	33.66
4	Motolite	32.95
5	BanKo Perlas	31.18

Best blockers

Rank	Name	Avg
1	BanKo Perlas	2.46
2	Motolite	2.42
3	Petro Gazz	2.34
4	Creamline	1.50
5	BaliPure	1.44

Best servers

Rank	Name	Avg
1	Creamline	2.41
2	Petro Gazz	2.13
3	PacificTown-Army	1.73
4	Motolite	1.66
5	BaliPure	1.50

Best diggers

Rank	Name	Avg
1	PacificTown-Army	14.05
2	Creamline	14.00
3	BanKo Perlas	12.97
4	Petro Gazz	12.50
5	Motolite	12.34

Best setters

Rank	Name	Avg
1	Creamline	6.82
2	Petro Gazz	6.53
3	BanKo Perlas	5.51
4	Motolite	5.47
5	PacificTown-Army	5.16

Best receivers

Rank	Name	%Succ
1	Petro Gazz	43.13
2	Motolite	35.23
3	BanKo Perlas	32.25
4	Creamline	31.98
5	PacificTown-Army	29.67

== See also ==
- 2019 Spikers’ Turf Reinforced Conference
