= 2018 Premier Volleyball League Reinforced Conference =

First conference of the 2018 PVL season

- Duration: May 6 – July 11, 2018
- Teams: 8
- TV partner(s): S+A; Liga

Results
- Champions: Creamline Cool Smashers
- Runners-up: PayMaya High Flyers
- Third place: BanKo Perlas Spikers
- Fourth place: Pocari Sweat–Air Force Lady Warriors

Awards
- Conference MVP: Myla Pablo
- Finals MVP: Jia Morado
- Best OH: Alyssa Valdez; Myla Pablo
- Best MB: Jeanette Panaga; Mary Joy Dacoron
- Best OPP: Michele Gumabao
- Best Setter: Jia Morado
- Best Libero: Tatan Pantone

PVL Reinforced Conference chronology
- < 2017 2019 >

PVL conference chronology
- < 2017 Collegiate 2018 Collegiate >

The women's division of the 2018 Premier Volleyball League Reinforced Conference was the fourth conference of the Premier Volleyball League and the first conference of the 2018 season. The conference started on April 27, 2018 with a Grand Fans Day at the Trinoma Activity Center, Quezon City, nine days before its opening ceremonies and games on May 6, 2018 at the Filoil Flying V Centre, San Juan City, Philippines.

PLDT returned as PayMaya after two years of absence in the league, and newcomer teams Tacloban Fighting Warays and Petro Gazz Angels were expected to join the league.

Teams played a single round robin in the preliminary round. The top two teams (ranks 1 and 2) after the preliminary round would automatically enter the semifinals round. The bottom teams after the preliminary round would play a single round robin to determine the two teams (as ranks 3 and 4) that would advance to the semifinals round.

== Participating teams ==
2018 Premier Volleyball League Reinforced Conference (Women's Division)
Abbr.	Team	Company	Head coach	Team captain	Import(s)
BLP	BaliPure–NU Water Defenders	Balibago Waterworks System, Inc.	(Philippines) Raymund Castillo	(Philippines) Joyme Cagande	(United States) Alexis Matthews (United States) Janisa Johnson
BKP	BanKo Perlas Spikers	Beach Volleyball Republic	(Philippines) Ariel dela Cruz	(Philippines) Sue Roces	(United States) Lakia Bright (Thailand) Jutarat Montripila
CCS	Creamline Cool Smashers	Republic Biscuit Corporation	(Thailand) Tai Bundit	(Philippines) Alyssa Valdez	(Thailand) Kuttika Kaewpin (United States) Laura Schaudt (Serbia) Nikolina Aščerić (withdrew)
IRG	Iriga City–Navy Oragons	Iriga City / Philippine Navy	(Philippines) Edgardo Rusit	(Philippines) Grazielle Bombita	(United States) Macy Ubben (United States) Lauren Whyte
PMY	PayMaya High Flyers	PLDT, Inc.	(Philippines) Roger Gorayeb	(Philippines) Jasmine Nabor	(United States) Tess Rountree (United States) Shelby Sullivan
PGZ	Petro Gazz Angels	Petro Gazz Ventures Phils Corp	(Philippines) Jerry Yee	(Philippines) Stephanie Mercado	(Ukraine) Anastasia Trach (Ukraine) Olena Lymareva-Flink (Estonia) Kadi Kullerkann (withdrew)
POC	Pocari Sweat–Air Force Lady Warriors	Federated Distributors, Inc.	(Philippines) Jasper Jimenez	(Philippines) Myla Pablo	(United States) Maddie Palmer (United States) Arielle Love
TAC	Tacloban Fighting Warays	Bounty Agro Ventures, Inc. (sponsor)	(Philippines) Ernesto Pamilar	(Philippines) Jovie Prado	(Thailand) Amporn Hyapha (Thailand) Patcharee Sangmuang (Thailand) Sasiwimol Sangpan (withdrew)

== Foreign players ==
Team	Player	Height	Country
BaliPure-NU	(United States) Alexis Matthews	1.91 m (6 ft 3 in)	United States
BaliPure-NU	(United States) Janisa Johnson	1.73 m (5 ft 8 in)	United States
BanKo Perlas	(United States) Lakia Jamiah Bright	1.80 m (5 ft 11 in)	United States
BanKo Perlas	(Thailand) Jutarat Montripila	1.78 m (5 ft 10 in)	Thailand
Creamline	(Thailand) Kuttika Kaewpin	1.71 m (5 ft 7 in)	Thailand
Creamline	(United States) Laura Schaudt	1.96 m (6 ft 5 in)	United States
Creamline	(Serbia) Nikolina Aščerić (replaced)	1.85 m (6 ft 1 in)	Serbia
Iriga-Navy	(United States) Macy Ubben	1.88 m (6 ft 2 in)	United States
Iriga-Navy	(United States) Lauren Whyte	1.85 m (6 ft 1 in)	United States
PayMaya	(United States) Tess Nicole Rountree	1.88 m (6 ft 2 in)	United States
PayMaya	(United States) Shelby Sullivan	1.88 m (6 ft 2 in)	United States
Petro Gazz	(Ukraine) Anastasia Trach	1.86 m (6 ft 1 in)	Ukraine
Petro Gazz	(Estonia) Kadi Kullerkann (replaced)	1.93 m (6 ft 4 in)	Estonia
Petro Gazz	(Ukraine) Olena Lymareva-Flink	1.82 m (6 ft 0 in)	Ukraine
Pocari Sweat-Air Force	(United States) Maddie Palmer	1.82 m (6 ft 0 in)	United States
Pocari Sweat-Air Force	(United States) Arielle Love	1.82 m (6 ft 0 in)	United States
Tacloban	(Thailand) Amporn Hyapha	1.80 m (5 ft 11 in)	Thailand
Tacloban	(Thailand) Patcharee Sangmuang	1.81 m (5 ft 11 in)	Thailand
Tacloban	(Thailand) Sasiwimol Sangpan (replaced)	1.76 m (5 ft 9 in)	Thailand

== Format ==
Preliminary round

The eight teams compete in a single round-robin tournament, with each team playing one match against all other teams for a total of seven matches. The top two teams will advance to the semifinals while the bottom six will continue competing in the quarterfinals.

Quarterfinals

The bottom six teams from the preliminary round compete in another single round-robin tournament, with each team playing a total of five matches. The top two teams will advance to the semifinals while the bottom four will be eliminated and ranked 5th through 8th in the final standings.

Semifinals

The top two teams from the preliminary round and the top two from the quarterfinals compete in the semifinals. Teams compete in best-of-three series with the winners advancing to the finals while the losers will compete in the third place series. The match-ups for the semifinals are as follows:

- SF1: PR #1 vs. QF #2
- SF2: PR #2 vs. QF #1

Third place series

The losing teams from the semifinals compete in a best-of-three series to determine which team will finish third in this conference. If the series is tied at 1–1 when the championship is decided, the pool standing procedure will be used (starting from set ratio).

Finals

The winning teams from the semifinals compete in a best-of-three series to determine the conference champions. The losing team in this round will be declared conference runners-up.

== Pool standing procedure ==
Teams are initially ranked by wins followed by match points. A win awards three points if the match lasted for three or four sets (3–0 or 3–1), or two points if the match lasted for five sets (3–2). A loss only awards one point if the match lasted for five sets (2–3).

If multiple teams tie for wins and match points, the next criteria are set ratio (the number of sets won divided by number of sets lost across all matches) and point ratio (the number of points won divided by number of points lost across all matches). If any teams are still tied, the procedure will be applied again, but only considering matches between the remaining tied teams.

== Preliminary round ==
Team standings

Pos	Team	Pld	W	L	Pts	SW	SL	SR	SPW	SPL	SPR	Qualification
1	Creamline Cool Smashers	7	6	1	19	20	4	5.000	573	482	1.189	Semifinals
2	PayMaya High Flyers	7	5	2	15	17	9	1.889	592	553	1.071	Semifinals
3	Tacloban Fighting Warays	7	4	3	10	13	14	0.929	591	622	0.950	Quarterfinals
4	Pocari–Air Force	7	3	4	10	13	15	0.867	606	594	1.020	Quarterfinals
5	Petro Gazz Angels	7	3	4	10	13	15	0.867	604	617	0.979	Quarterfinals
6	BaliPure Purest Water Defenders	7	3	4	9	13	16	0.813	642	654	0.982	Quarterfinals
7	BanKo Perlas Spikers	7	3	4	8	14	17	0.824	677	686	0.987	Quarterfinals
8	Iriga City–Navy Oragons	7	1	6	3	6	19	0.316	542	619	0.876	Quarterfinals

Source: P-4

Match results

- All times are in Philippines Standard Time (UTC+08:00)

Date	Time		Score		Set 1	Set 2	Set 3	Set 4	Set 5	Total	Report
May 06	15:00	Tacloban Fighting Warays	0–3	PayMaya High Flyers	8–25	31–33	20–25			59–83	P2
May 06	17:00	Creamline Cool Smashers	3–0	Petro Gazz Angels	25–18	25–16	25–13			75–47	P2
May 09	16:00	Iriga City–Navy Oragons	3–1	BaliPure–NU Water Defenders	25–23	25–23	22–25	25–19		97–90	P2
May 09	18:30	Petro Gazz Angels	2–3	Tacloban Fighting Warays	17–25	25–27	25–21	25–14	13–15	105–102	P2
May 12	14:00	PayMaya High Flyers	3–0	Pocari Sweat–Air Force Lady Warriors	25–20	25–19	25–22			75–61	P2
May 12	16:00	BanKo Perlas Spikers	3–2	Creamline Cool Smashers	22–25	25–16	25–23	17–25	15–11	104–100	P2
May 13	14:00	Pocari Sweat–Air Force Lady Warriors	3–1	BanKo Perlas Spikers	15–25	25–15	25–18	25–22		90–80	P2
May 13	16:00	Creamline Cool Smashers	3–0	PayMaya High Flyers	25–18	25–23	25–19			75–60	P21
May 16	16:00	BaliPure–NU Water Defenders	3–2	Petro Gazz Angels	22–25	25–23	28–26	22–25	15–12	112–111	P2
May 16	18:30	BanKo Perlas Spikers	1–3	Tacloban Fighting Warays	27–25	26–28	19–25	23–25		95–103	P2
May 19	14:00	PayMaya High Flyers	3–1	Iriga City–Navy Oragons	25–23	22–25	25–20	25–23		97–91	P2
May 19	16:00	BaliPure–NU Water Defenders	3–1	Tacloban Fighting Warays	25–22	25–20	22–25	25–22		97–89	P2
May 20	14:00	Petro Gazz Angels	3–2	BanKo Perlas Spikers	15–25	18–25	25–18	25–20	15–9	98–97	P2
May 20	16:00	Pocari Sweat–Air Force Lady Warriors	1–3	Creamline Cool Smashers	15–25	25–27	25–17	19–25		84–94	P22
May 23	16:00	BaliPure–NU Water Defenders	3–1	BanKo Perlas Spikers	25–22	25–22	22–25	32–30		104–99	P2
May 23	18:30	Iriga City–Navy Oragons	1–3	Pocari Sweat–Air Force Lady Warriors	8–25	25–23	18–25	16–25		67–98	P2
May 26	14:00	Petro Gazz Angels	3–0	Iriga City–Navy Oragons	25–22	30–28	25–13			80–63	P2
May 26	16:00	BanKo Perlas Spikers	3–2	PayMaya High Flyers	18–25	18–25	25–19	25–22	15–11	101–102	P2
May 27	14:00	Tacloban Fighting Warays	0–3	Creamline Cool Smashers	14–25	25–27	24–26			63–78	P2
May 27	16:00	Pocari Sweat–Air Force Lady Warriors	3–1	BaliPure–NU Water Defenders	25–19	10–25	25–17	25–21		85–82	P23
May 30	16:00	Petro Gazz Angels	3–1	Pocari Sweat–Air Force Lady Warriors	25–19	20–25	28–26	25–21		98–91	P2
May 30	18:30	Tacloban Fighting Warays	3–0	Iriga City–Navy Oragons	25–20	25–22	27–25			77–67	P2
Jun 02	16:00	BaliPure–NU Water Defenders	0–3	Creamline Cool Smashers	22–25	18–25	16–25			56–75	P2
Jun 02	18:30	PayMaya High Flyers	3–0	Petro Gazz Angels	27–25	25–23	25–17			77–65	P2
Jun 03	16:00	Iriga City–Navy Oragons	1–3	BanKo Perlas Spikers	18–25	25–23	20–25	26–28		89–101	P2
Jun 03	18:30	Pocari Sweat–Air Force Lady Warriors	2–3	Tacloban Fighting Warays	17–25	25–17	20–25	25–16	10–15	97–98	P24
Jun 06	16:00	Creamline Cool Smashers	3–0	Iriga City–Navy Oragons	25–21	26–24	25–23			76–68	P2
Jun 06	18:30	PayMaya High Flyers	3–2	BaliPure–NU Water Defenders	13–25	25–21	25–21	20–25	15–9	98–101	P25

== Quarterfinals round ==
Team standings

Pos	Team	Pld	W	L	Pts	SW	SL	SR	SPW	SPL	SPR	Qualification
1	BanKo Perlas Spikers	5	5	0	14	15	3	5.000	345	354	0.975	Semifinals
2	Pocari–Air Force	5	4	1	11	12	7	1.714	431	423	1.019	Semifinals
3	Petro Gazz Angels	5	3	2	9	10	6	1.667	372	329	1.131	
4	BaliPure Purest Water Defenders	5	2	3	6	9	11	0.818	428	438	0.977	
5	Iriga City–Navy Oragons	5	1	4	4	8	14	0.571	461	489	0.943	
6	Tacloban Fighting Warays	5	0	5	1	2	15	0.133	318	412	0.772	

Match results

- All times are in Philippines Standard Time (UTC+08:00)

Date	Time		Score		Set 1	Set 2	Set 3	Set 4	Set 5	Total	Report
Jun 09	14:00	BanKo Perlas Spikers	3–0	Tacloban Fighting Warays	25–22	25–20	25–18			75–60	P2
Jun 09	16:00	Iriga City–Navy Oragons	2–3	BaliPure–NU Water Defenders	17–25	25–18	25–20	24–26	16–18	107–107	P2
Jun 09	18:30	Pocari Sweat–Air Force Lady Warriors	3–1	Petro Gazz Angels	18–25	25–20	26–24	25–21		94–90	P2
Jun 13	16:00	Petro Gazz Angels	3–0	Tacloban Fighting Warays	25–15	25–17	25–21			75–53	P2
Jun 13	18:30	Iriga City–Navy Oragons	1–3	Pocari Sweat–Air Force Lady Warriors	25–23	18–25	20–25	22–25		85–98	P2
Jun 16	14:00	Tacloban Fighting Warays	2–3	Iriga City–Navy Oragons	9–25	25–21	28–26	21–25	13–15	96–112	P2
Jun 16	16:00	Pocari Sweat–Air Force Lady Warriors	0–3	BanKo Perlas Spikers	19–25	14–25	22–25			55–75	P2
Jun 16	18:30	Petro Gazz Angels	3–0	BaliPure–NU Water Defenders	25–23	25–18	25–14			75–55	P2
Jun 20	16:00	BaliPure–NU Water Defenders	2–3	Pocari Sweat–Air Force Lady Warriors	27–29	25–20	25–19	24–26	13–15	114–109	P2
Jun 20	18:30	Iriga City–Navy Oragons	2–3	BanKo Perlas Spikers	17–25	25–23	26–28	25–22	12–15	105–113	P2
Jun 23	14:00	Petro Gazz Angels	3–0	Iriga City–Navy Oragons	25–19	25–14	25–19			75–52	P2
Jun 23	16:00	BanKo Perlas Spikers	3–1	BaliPure–NU Water Defenders	25–19	22–25	25–14	25–19		97–77	P2
Jun 23	18:30	Tacloban Fighting Warays	0–3	Pocari Sweat–Air Force Lady Warriors	22–25	17–25	20–25			59–75	P2
Jun 27	16:00	BanKo Perlas Spikers	3–0	Petro Gazz Angels	25–19	25–19	25–19			75–57	P2
Jun 27	18:30	BaliPure–NU Water Defenders	3–0	Tacloban Fighting Warays	25–18	25–16	25–16			75–50	P2

== Final round ==
- All series are best-of-three.

Semifinals
1	Creamline Cool Smashers	0	3	3
4	Pocari–Air Force	3	1	0
2	PayMaya High Flyers	1	3	3
3	BanKo Perlas Spikers	3	2	2

Finals
Creamline Cool Smashers	3	3	–
PayMaya High Flyers	1	0	–
3rd place
BanKo Perlas Spikers	2	3	–
Pocari–Air Force	3	1	–

=== Semifinals ===
Rank 1 vs Rank 4

Date	Time		Score		Set 1	Set 2	Set 3	Set 4	Set 5	Total	Report
Jul 01	13:45	Creamline Cool Smashers	0–3	Pocari Sweat–Air Force Lady Warriors	23–25	12–25	23–25			58–75	P2
Jul 04	15:45	Pocari Sweat–Air Force Lady Warriors	1–3	Creamline Cool Smashers	16–25	24–26	25–22	17–25		82–98	P2
Jul 06	13:45	Creamline Cool Smashers	3–0	Pocari Sweat–Air Force Lady Warriors	25–15	25–18	25–16			75–49	P2

Rank 2 vs Rank 3

Date	Time		Score		Set 1	Set 2	Set 3	Set 4	Set 5	Total	Report
Jul 01	15:45	PayMaya High Flyers	1–3	BanKo Perlas Spikers	19–25	28–26	23–25	23–25		93–101	P2
Jul 04	13:45	BanKo Perlas Spikers	2–3	PayMaya High Flyers	26–28	16–25	27–25	27–25	12–15	108–118	P2
Jul 06	15:45	PayMaya High Flyers	3–2	BanKo Perlas Spikers	22–25	14–25	25–14	25–23	15–12	101–99	P2

=== Finals ===
3rd place

Date	Time		Score		Set 1	Set 2	Set 3	Set 4	Set 5	Total	Report
Jul 08	14:00	BanKo Perlas Spikers	2–3	Pocari Sweat–Air Force Lady Warriors	22–25	25–17	25–16	24–26	11–15	107–99	P2
Jul 11	13:45	Pocari Sweat–Air Force Lady Warriors	1–3	BanKo Perlas Spikers	25–23	10–25	14–25	17–25		66–98	P2

Championship

Date	Time		Score		Set 1	Set 2	Set 3	Set 4	Set 5	Total	Report
Jul 08	17:00	Creamline Cool Smashers	3–1	PayMaya High Flyers	25–21	22–25	25–20	25–19		97–85	P2
Jul 11	15:45	PayMaya High Flyers	0–3	Creamline Cool Smashers	19–25	20–25	11–25			50–75	P2

2nd Reinforced Conference Women's Division Champions
Creamline Cool Smashers
Alyssa Valdez (c), Melissa Gohing, Coleen Laurice Bravo, Risa Sato, Ivy Elayne Remulla, Maria Paulina Soriano, Julia Melissa Morado, Alexine Danielle Cabaños, Jessica Margarett Galanza, Rizza Jane Mandapat, Kuttika Kaewpin,
Michele Gumabao, Laura Schaudt, Kyla Llana Atienza
Head coach: Anusorn "Tai" Bundit

== Awards ==
Award		Player	Ref.
Most Valuable Player	Finals	(Philippines) Jia Morado (Creamline)	
Most Valuable Player	Conference	(Philippines) Myla Pablo (Pocari–Air Force)	
Best Outside Spikers	1st: 2nd:	(Philippines) Alyssa Valdez (Creamline) (Philippines) Myla Pablo (Pocari–Air Force)	
Best Middle Blockers	1st: 2nd:	(Philippines) Jeanette Panaga (Pocari–Air Force) (Philippines) Mary Joy Dacoron (BanKo Perlas)	
Best Opposite Spiker		(Philippines) Michele Gumabao (Creamline)	
Best Setter		(Philippines) Jia Morado (Creamline)	
Best Libero		(Philippines) Tatan Pantone (PayMaya)	
Most Points Scored		(United States) Lakia Bright (BanKo Perlas)	
Best Foreign Guest Player		(United States) Tess Nicole Rountree (PayMaya)	

== Final standings ==
Rank	Team
1st place, gold medalist(s)	Creamline Cool Smashers
2nd place, silver medalist(s)	PayMaya Highflyers
3rd place, bronze medalist(s)	BanKo Perlas Spikers
4	Pocari Sweat–Air Force Lady Warriors
5	Petro Gazz Angels
6	BaliPure Purest Water Defenders
7	Iriga City–Navy Oragons
8	Tacloban Fighting Warays

== Medal team rosters ==
Champions	Runners-up	Third place
Creamline Cool Smashers	PayMaya Highflyers	BanKo Perlas Spikers
Alyssa Valdez (c); Coleen Laurice Bravo; Risa Sato; Ivy Elayne Remulla; Pau Soriano; Kyla Llana Atienza; Jia Morado; Alexine Danielle Cabanos; Jema Galanza; Rizza Jane Mandapat; Kuttika Kaewpin (I); Michele Gumabao; Laura Schaudt (I); Melissa Gohing Head coach: (Thailand) Tai Bundit	Shelby Hollowell Sullivan (I); Tess Nicole Rountree (I); Grethcel Soltones; Tatan Pantone; Czarina Grace Carandang; Maria Angelica Cayuna; Aiko Sweet Urdas; Jasmine Nabor (c); Katherine Villegas; Celine Elaiza Domingo; Jorelle Singh; Jerrili Malabanan; Alyssa Eroa; Joyce Sta. Rita Head coach: (Philippines) Roger Gorayeb	Ryssabel Devanadera; Suzanne Roces (c); Mary Mae Tajima; Dzi Gervacio; Ma. Gizelle Jessica Tan; Amanda Maria Villanueva; Jutarat Montripila (I); Mary Joy Dacoron; Jamenea Ferrer; Lakia Bright (I); Amy Ahomiro; Fenela Risha Emnas; Nicole Tiamzon Head coach: (Philippines) Ariel dela Cruz
