= Olena Lymareva-Flink =

Ukrainian volleyball player

Personal information
- Full name: Olena Lymareva-Flink
- Nickname: Lena
- Nationality: Ukrainian
- Born: June 3, 1992 (age 34); Severodonetsk, Ukraine
- Height: 1.82 m (6 ft 0 in)

Volleyball information
- Position: Outside hitter
- Current club: Volley Lugano
- Number: 2

Career
Years	Teams
2006–2009	Severodonchanka
2009–2014	Regina
2014–2016	LP Viesti
2016–2017	Kazan BS
2017	Volley Soverato
2017–2018	Yesilyurt
2018	Petro Gazz Angels
2018–2019	LP Viesti
2019	PacificTown-Army Lady Troopers
2019-2020	Fatum-Nyíregyháza
2020-2021	Terville-Florange OC
2021-2022	Saint-Raphael
2022-2023	Vandoeuvre-Nacy
2023-2024	Mielec
2023-2024	Volley Lugano

Olena Lymareva-Flink, (born June 3, 1992, in Severodonetsk) is a Ukrainian indoor volleyball player. She is a current member of the Volley Lugano in Switzerland NLA-league.

Lymareva-Flink transfer from her home country Ukraine 2014 to Finland. She played two years with LP Viesti (LP Salo) and won one championships, one silver medal and two time Finnish Cup. She also played in 2014–15 CEV Women's Champions League on her first year in Finland.

2016-2017 she played first in Turkey for Kazan BS before entering A2-league in Italy for the rest of the season playing for Soverato. 2017–2018 season she spend again in Turkey, this time in Yesilyurt.

After finishing season Lymareva-Flink went to play in the Philippines for Petro Gazz Angels team at Philippines 2018 Premier Volleyball League Reinforced Conference.

2018–2019 season she played from December until the end of the season for her hometown team LP Viesti winning second Finish championship. After the season she went to represent again PVL-team at Philippines, this time PacificTown-Army Lady Troopers. They won bronze medals.

For the season 2019-2020 Lymareva-Flink moved to Hungarian Extraliga team Fatum-Nyíregyháza.

2020–2023 seasons Lymareva-Flink played in France: Terville-Florange OC., Saint Raphael and Vandoeuvre-Nancy.

She played mostly as outside spiker, but also as opposite.

== Club ==
- (Ukraine) Severodonchanka (2006–2009)
- (Ukraine) Regina (2009–2014)
- (Finland) LP Viesti (2014–2016)
- (Turkey) Kazan BS (2016–2017)
- (Italy) Volley Soverato (2017)
- (Turkey) Yesilyurt (2017–2018)
- (Philippines) Petro Gazz Angels (2018)
- (Finland) LP Viesti (2018–2019)
- (Philippines) PacificTown-Army Lady Troopers (2019)
- (Hungary) Fatum-Nyíregyháza (2019–2020)
- (France) Terville-Florange (2020–2021)
- (France) St-Raphael (2021–2022)
- (France) Vandoeuvre-Nancy (2022–2023)
- (Poland) Stal Mielec (2023)
- (Switzerland) Volley Lugano (2023–2024)

== Awards ==
=== Individuals ===
- Allstar player in Finnish league 2014-2015 (as opposite)
- Player of the Month in Finnish Mestaruusliiga
- Four times on All-Star of the Month in Finnish Mestaruusliiga

=== Clubs ===
- Two times Ukrainian champion
- Two times Finnish champion 2015 and 2019, silver 2016
- Finnish cupchampion 2014, 2015
- PVL bronze 2019
- Hungarian cupsilver 2020
