= List of former Premier Volleyball League teams =

The Premier Volleyball League (PVL) was established in 2017 as a rebranding of the Shakey's V-League (SVL) which lasted from 2004 to 2016. Listed below are all of the former teams that previously competed in the PVL, including guest teams and collegiate teams

== List of teams ==
=== Commercial teams ===
Team	Affiliation	First conference	Last conference	Ref.
BaliPure Purest Water Defenders	Balibago Waterworks System, Inc.	2017 Reinforced	2022 Open	
Chef's Classics Lady Red Spikers	LJS Group of Companies	2019 Open		
Chery Tiggo Crossovers	United Asia Automotive Group	2021 Open	2025 Reinforced	
Cignal Super Spikers	Cignal TV, Inc.	2021 Open	2O26 All-Filipino	
F2 Logistics Cargo Movers	F2 Global Logistics Inc.	2022 Open	2023 Second All-Filipino	
Foton Tornadoes	United Asia Automotive Group, Inc.	2023 Invitational		
Iriga City Oragons	Iriga LGU	2018 Reinforced	2018 Open	
Motolite Power Builders	Philippine Batteries Inc.	2019 Reinforced	2019 Open	
PayMaya High Flyers	PLDT Inc.	2018 Reinforced		
Philippine Air Force Lady Jet Spikers	Philippine Air Force	2017 Reinforced	2019 Open	
Philippine Army Lady Troopers	Philippine Army	2017 Reinforced	2023 First All-Filipino	
Perlas Spikers	Beach Volleyball Republic	2017 Reinforced	2021 Open	
Petro Gazz Angels	PetroGazz Ventures Phils.	2018 Reinforced	2025 Reinforced	
Pocari Sweat Lady Warriors	Federated Distributors, Inc.	2017 Reinforced	2018 Open (Note: During the 2018 season, Pocari Sweat and Philippine Air Force merged as a single team, forming the Pocari Sweat–Air Force Lady Warriors.)	
Power Smashers	Laoag LGU	2017 Reinforced	2017 Open	
Quezon City Gerflor Defenders	Gerflor Philippines / Quezon City Sports Management Services	2023 Invitational	2023 Second All-Filipino	
Sta. Lucia Lady Realtors	Sta. Lucia Realty and Development Corporation	2021 Open		
Tacloban Fighting Warays	Bounty Agro Ventures	2018 Reinforced	2018 Open	

=== Guest teams ===
As part of the Invitational Conference, the league invites foreign guest teams to compete alongside the local teams.

Team	FIVB member federation	First appearance	Most recent appearance
Est Cola	Thailand	2024 Invitational	2026 Invitational
Ho Chi Minh City	Vietnam	2026 Invitational	
KingWhale Taipei	Chinese Taipei (Taiwan)	2022 Invitational	
Kinh Bắc Bắc Ninh	Vietnam	2023 Invitational	
Kobe Shinwa University	Japan	2025 Invitational	
Kurashiki Ablaze	Japan	2023 Invitational	2024 Invitational

=== Collegiate teams ===
Most collegiate teams have only taken part in the now-defunct Collegiate Conference, but there have been occasions in which a collegiate team joined either the Reinforced or Open Conference, usually with a commercial sponsor attached. Since 2022, following the league's professionalization, collegiate teams compete in the V-League.

Team	School	First conference	Last conference
Adamson Lady Falcons	Adamson University	2017 Open (Note: Competed as Adamson–Akari Lady Falcons.)	2019 Collegiate
Arellano Lady Chiefs	Arellano University	2017 Collegiate	2019 Collegiate
Ateneo Lady Eagles	Ateneo de Manila University	2017 Collegiate	2019 Collegiate
Benilde Lady Blazers	De La Salle–College of Saint Benilde	2017 Collegiate	2019 Collegiate
FEU Lady Tamaraws	Far Eastern University	2017 Collegiate	2019 Collegiate
JRU Lady Bombers	José Rizal University	2017 Collegiate	
Letran Lady Knights	Colegio de San Juan de Letran	2019 Collegiate	
Lyceum Lady Pirates	Lyceum of the Philippines University	2017 Collegiate	2019 Collegiate
NU Lady Bulldogs	National University, Manila	2017 Collegiate	2018 Reinforced (Note: Competed as BaliPure–NU Water Defenders.)
Perpetual Lady Altas	University of Perpetual Help System DALTA	2018 Collegiate	2019 Collegiate
San Beda Lady Red Spikers	San Beda University	2017 Collegiate	2019 Collegiate
San Sebastian Lady Stags	San Sebastian College – Recoletos	2017 Collegiate	2019 Collegiate
TIP Lady Engineers	Technological Institute of the Philippines	2017 Collegiate	2019 Collegiate
UP Fighting Maroons	University of the Philippines Diliman	2017 Open	2018 Collegiate
UST Golden Tigresses	University of Santo Tomas	2018 Collegiate	2019 Collegiate

== Franchise lineage ==
As a result of franchise acquisitions, teams share their lineage with the teams acquired by their respective companies.

=== Active lineages ===
The lineages listed below are sorted from oldest to newest based on the establishing team. Bold indicates the active team in the lineage.

- Quezon City Gerflor → **Strong Group/Zus Coffee**
- F2 Logistics → **Capital1**
