= List of Premier Volleyball League seasons =

The Premier Volleyball League (PVL) was established in 2017 as a rebranding of the Shakey's V-League. It currently has completed eight seasons in its history. Each season is separated into multiple tournaments (known as conferences) with their own formats and regulations. Each conference begins with a preliminary round before advancing to the knockout rounds, culminating in a Finals series to determine the conference champion.

From 2017 to 2023, the league used a year-round calendar from January to December. In February 2024, the league announced a calendar shift in an effort to better align their calendar with that of the FIVB. The 2024–25 season was an extended season as part of the transition to the new calendar. Starting from the 2025–26 season, the calendar now runs from June to May.

From 2017 to 2019, winning two conferences (excluding the Collegiate Conference) is considered a Golden Double. Since 2022, winning three conferences gives the team the distinction of winning the Grand Slam.

== List of seasons ==
Key
AFC	All-Filipino Conference	OC	Open Conference	RC	Reinforced Conference
IC	Invitational Conference	CC	Collegiate Conference		

Season		Duration		Conf.	No. of teams	Champions	Broadcast partner
No.	Year(s)	Start	End	Conf.	No. of teams	Champions	Broadcast partner
1	2017	April 30, 2017	October 29, 2017	3	6–12	RC: Pocari Sweat; OC: BaliPure; CC: NU	ABS-CBN Sports
2	2018	April 17, 2018	December 8, 2018	3	8	RC: Creamline; CC: UP; OC: Creamline	ABS-CBN Sports
3	2019	May 26, 2019	October 12, 2019	3	6–9	RC: Petro Gazz; OC: Creamline; CC: Adamson	ABS-CBN Sports
4	2020	Season cancelled due to COVID-19 pandemic					
5	2021	July 17, 2021	August 13, 2021	1 (Note: In the 2021 season, only one conference was held due to the continued effects and the preventive measures imposed during the height of the COVID-19 pandemic in the Philippines.)	10	OC: Chery Tiggo	Cignal TV
6	2022	March 16, 2022	December 6, 2022	3	8–9	OC: Creamline; IC: Creamline; RC: Petro Gazz	Cignal TV
7	2023	February 4, 2023	December 16, 2023	3	9–13	1st AFC: Creamline; IC: Kurashiki; 2nd AFC: Creamline	Cignal TV
8	2024–25	February 20, 2024	April 12, 2025	4 (Note: The 2024–25 season was an extended due to the league's calendar shifting from January–December to June–May. As a result, two All-Filipino Conferences were held during the season.)	12	2024 AFC: Creamline; RC: Creamline; IC: Creamline; 2024–25 AFC: Petro Gazz	Cignal TV
9	2025–26	August 21, 2025	April 23, 2026	4 (Note: Despite being part of the preseason, 2025 Premier Volleyball League on Tour uses a traditional format and is recognized as a major conference in the 2025–26 season.)	10–12	Tour: PLDT; IC: PLDT; RC: Petro Gazz; AFC: Creamline	Cignal TV
10	2026–27	October 10, 2026	2027	2 (Note: Despite being part of the preseason, 2026 Premier Volleyball League Invitational Conference uses a traditional format and is recognized as a major conference in the 2026–27 season. Additionally, due to the extended 2026–27 Premier Volleyball League All-Filipino Conference, only two major conferences are being held.)	9	IC: Est Cola; AFC: (Note: Season champion.)	Cignal TV
