= Premier Volleyball League Most Valuable Player awards =

Premier Volleyball League award

The Premier Volleyball League Most Valuable Player awards are two Premier Volleyball League awards given to the best performing player of a season or conference. The conference award has been given since the league's first conference in 2017. The season award, known as the Most Valuable Player of the Season award is given out by the PVL Press Corps since 2025.

Alyssa Valdez, Tots Carlos, and Brooke Van Sickle are tied for most conference MVP awards with three each. Two others have won conference MVP twice: Myla Pablo and Jaja Santiago. Papatchaya Phontham is the most recent recipient and the first and only non-Filipino player to win the award.

== Key ==
^	Denotes player who is still active in the PVL
†	Denotes player whose team won the conference championship
Player (#)	Denotes the number of times the player has been named MVP
Team (#)	Denotes the number of times a player from this team has won

== Most Valuable Player of the Season ==
=== Winners ===
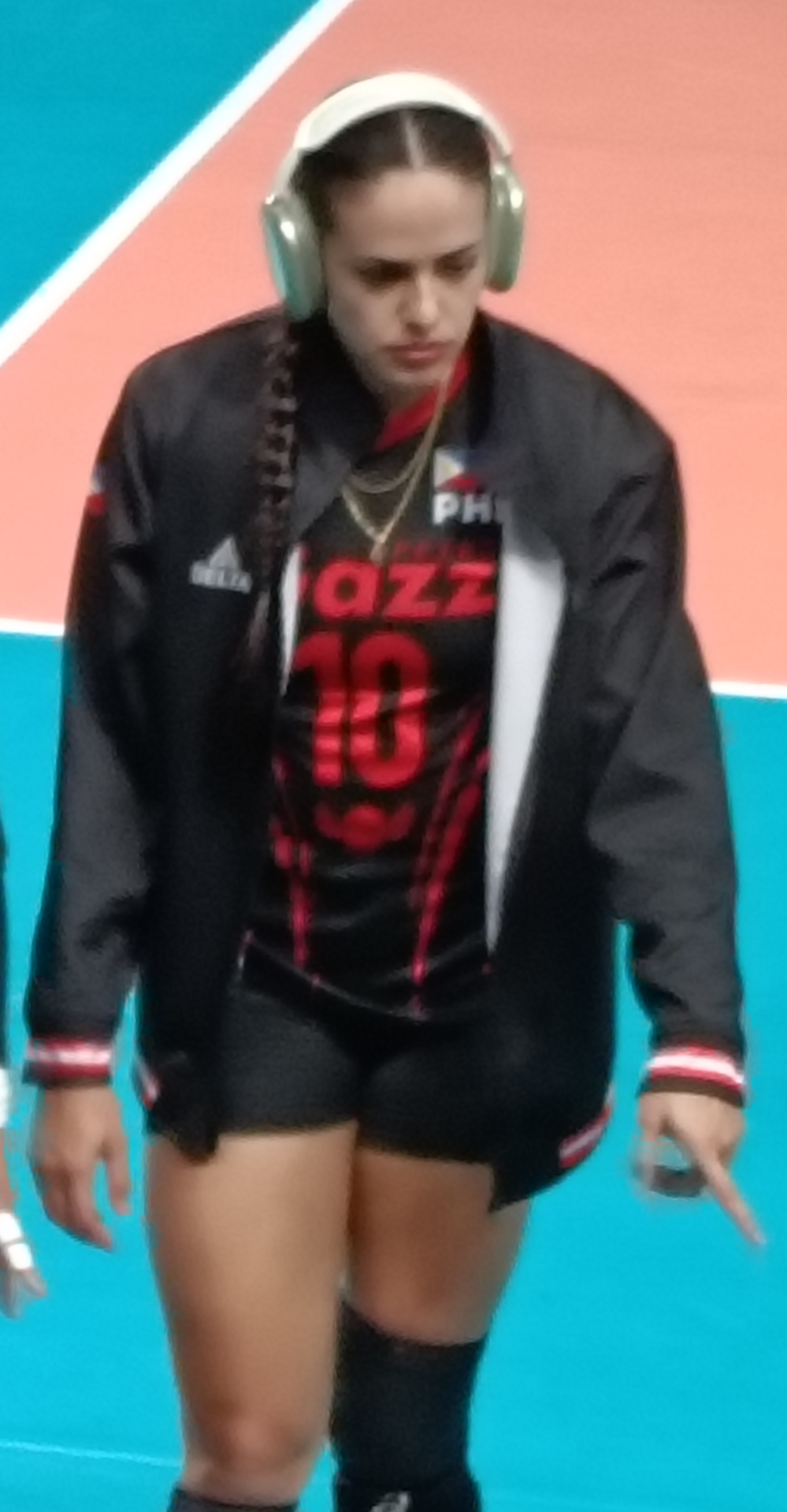
Brooke Van Sickle won the first annual MVP award given by the PVL Press Corps. She is also one of three players to win three conference MVP awards.

Season	Player	Nat.	Team	Ref.
2024–25	Brooke Van Sickle^	(Philippines) (United States)	Petro Gazz Angels	
2025–26	Trisha Tubu^	(Philippines)	Farm Fresh Foxies	

== Conference Most Valuable Player ==
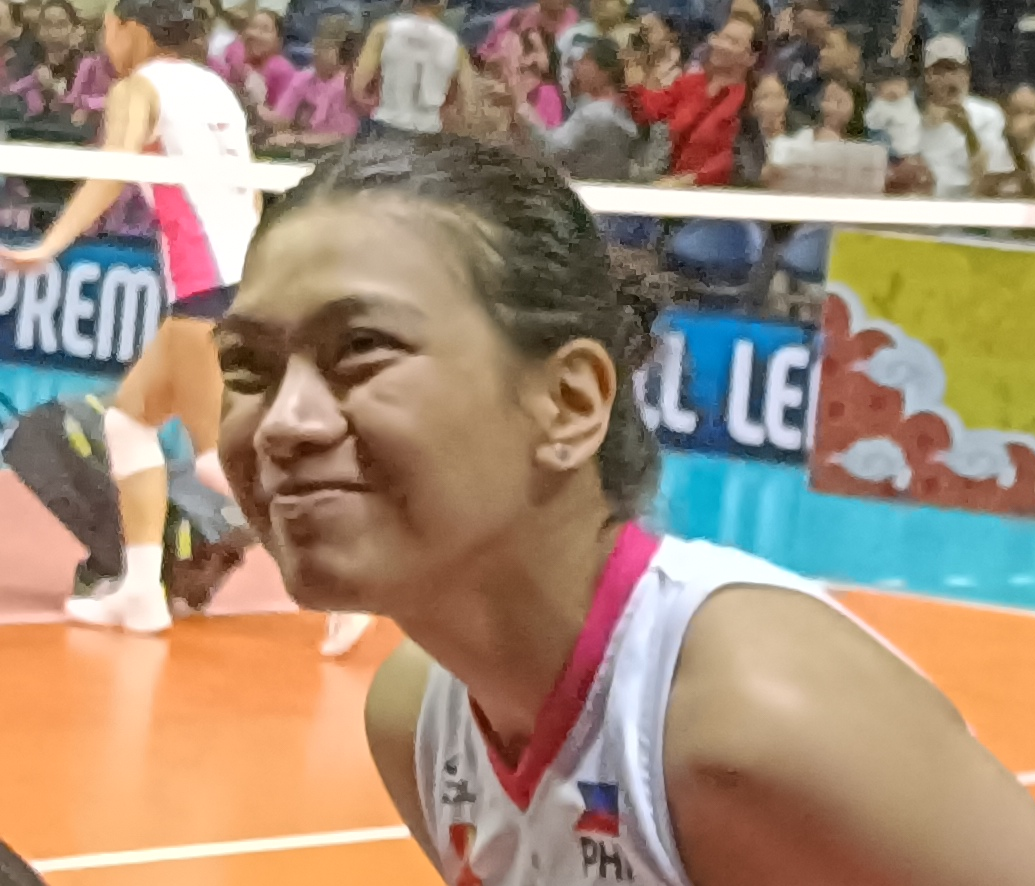
Alyssa Valdez is one of three players to win three MVP awards.

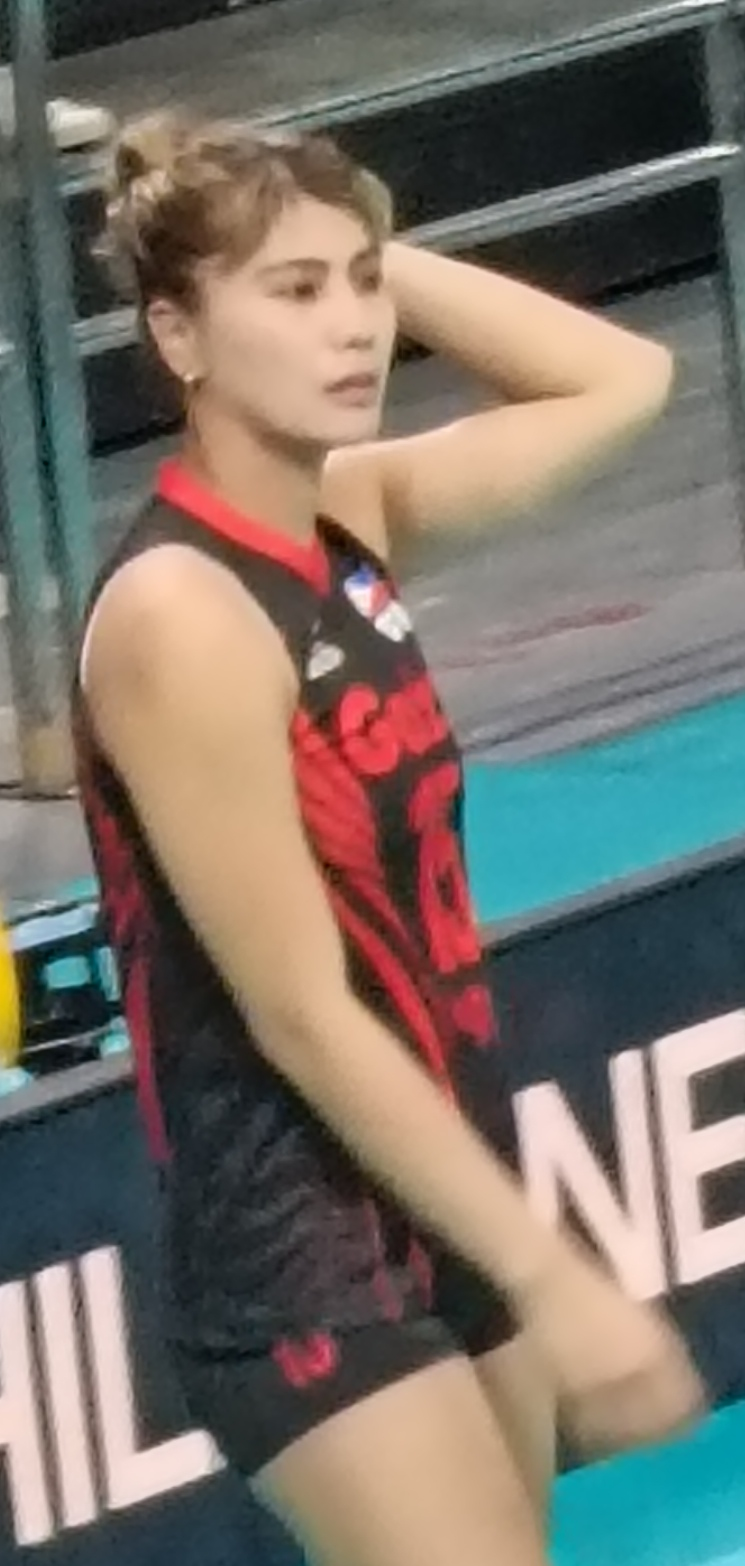
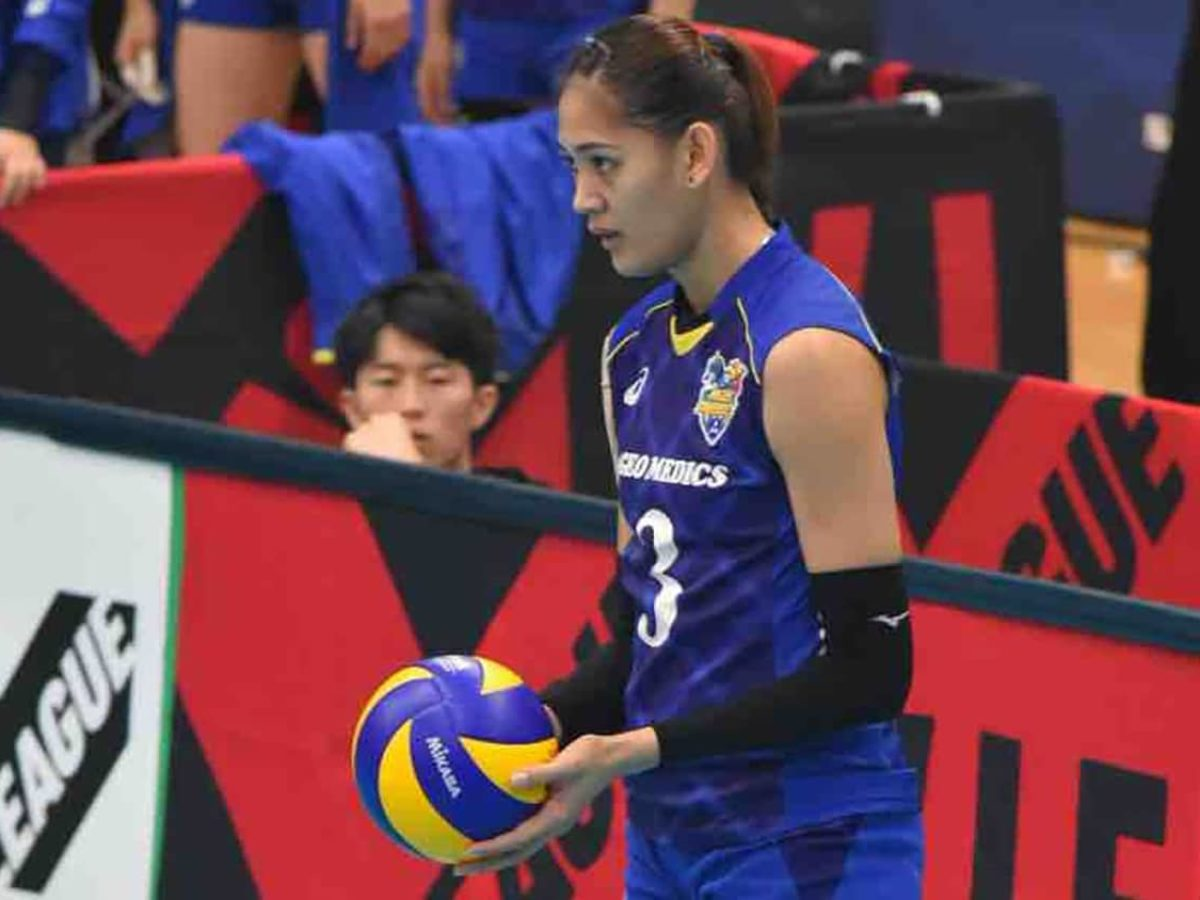
Myla Pablo (top) and Jaja Santiago (bottom) are among the players to have won two MVP awards in the women's division.

Season	Conference	Player	Nat.	Team	Ref.
2017	Reinforced	Alyssa Valdez^	(Philippines)	Creamline Cool Smashers	
2017	Open	Myla Pablo^	(Philippines)	Pocari Sweat Lady Warriors	
2017	Collegiate †	Jaja Santiago	(Philippines) (Note: Jaja Santiago obtained Japanese citizenship in August 2024.)	NU Lady Bulldogs	
2018	Reinforced	Myla Pablo^ (2)	(Philippines)	Pocari Sweat Lady Warriors (2)	
2018	Collegiate †	Isa Molde^	(Philippines)	UP Fighting Maroons	
2018	Open †	Alyssa Valdez^ (2)	(Philippines)	Creamline Cool Smashers (2)	
2019	Reinforced	Alyssa Valdez^ (3)	(Philippines)	Creamline Cool Smashers (3)	
2019	Open †	Jessica Galanza^	(Philippines)	Creamline Cool Smashers (4)	
2019	Collegiate †	Trisha Genesis^	(Philippines)	Adamson Lady Falcons	
2021	Open †	Jaja Santiago (2)	(Philippines)	Chery Tiggo Crossovers	
2022	Open †	Tots Carlos^	(Philippines)	Creamline Cool Smashers (5)	
2022	Invitational †	Tots Carlos^ (2)	(Philippines)	Creamline Cool Smashers (6)	
2022	Reinforced	Mylene Paat^	(Philippines)	Chery Tiggo Crossovers (2)	
2023	1st All-Filipino †	Tots Carlos^ (3)	(Philippines)	Creamline Cool Smashers (7)	
2023	Invitational	Frances Molina^	(Philippines)	Cignal HD Spikers	
2023	2nd All-Filipino	Sisi Rondina^	(Philippines)	Choco Mucho Flying Titans	
2024–25	2024 All-Filipino	Brooke Van Sickle^	(Philippines) (United States)	Petro Gazz Angels	
2024–25	Reinforced †	Bernadeth Pons^	(Philippines)	Creamline Cool Smashers (8)	
2024–25	Invitational †	Michele Gumabao^	(Philippines)	Creamline Cool Smashers (9)	
2024–25	2024–25 All-Filipino †	Brooke Van Sickle^ (2)	(Philippines) (United States)	Petro Gazz Angels (2)	
2025–26	PVL on Tour	Erika Santos^	(Philippines)	Cignal HD Spikers (2)	
2025–26	Invitational †	Savi Davison^	(Philippines) (Canada)	PLDT High Speed Hitters	
2025–26	Reinforced †	Brooke Van Sickle^ (3)	(Philippines) (United States)	Petro Gazz Angels (3)	
2025–26	All-Filipino	Vanie Gandler^	(Philippines)	Cignal Super Spikers (3)	
2026–27	Invitational †	Papatchaya Phontham	(Thailand)	Est Cola	

=== Multi-time winners ===
Awards	Player	Team(s)	Conferences
3	(Philippines) Tots Carlos	Creamline Cool Smashers	2022 Open, 2022 Invitational, 2023 1st All-Filipino
3	(Philippines) Alyssa Valdez	Creamline Cool Smashers	2017 Reinforced, 2018 Open, 2019 Reinforced
3	(Philippines) (United States) Brooke Van Sickle	Petro Gazz Angels	2024 All-Filipino, 2024–25 All-Filipino, 2025 Reinforced
2	(Philippines) Myla Pablo	Pocari Sweat Lady Warriors	2017 Open, 2018 Reinforced
2	(Japan) (Philippines) Jaja Santiago	NU Lady Bulldogs, Chery Tiggo Crossovers	2017 Collegiate, 2021 Open

=== Teams ===
Awards	Team	Conferences
9	Creamline Cool Smashers	2017 Reinforced, 2018 Open, 2019 Reinforced, 2019 Open, 2022 Open, 2022 Invitational, 2023 1st All-Filipino, 2024 Reinforced, 2024 Invitational
3	Cignal Super Spikers	2023 Invitational, 2025 PVL on Tour, 2026 All-Filipino
3	Petro Gazz Angels	2024 All-Filipino, 2024–25 All-Filipino, 2025 Reinforced
2	Chery Tiggo Crossovers	2021 Open, 2022 Reinforced
2	Pocari Sweat Lady Warriors	2017 Open, 2018 Reinforced

== See also ==
- Spikers' Turf Most Valuable Player award
