= Premier Volleyball League Collegiate Conference =

Inactive Premier Volleyball League conference

- Sport: Volleyball
- Founded: 2017; 9 years ago
- First season: 2017
- Folded: 2020; 6 years ago
- Last champion: Adamson
- Most titles: Adamson; NU; UP (1 title each)

The Premier Volleyball League Collegiate Conference was a conference in the Premier Volleyball League (PVL). This conference featured only collegiate teams from various associations. The name carried over from the conference of the same name in the Shakey's V-League. In 2017 and 2018, the conference featured both women's and men's divisions. In 2019, only the women's division was held after the men's division was spun-off into Spikers' Turf.

Following the PVL's transition to a professional league in 2020, the Collegiate Conference can no longer be held beginning with the 2021 season. Thus in 2022, Sports Vision relaunched the V-League as a separate league to accommodate collegiate teams.

In the three-year history of the conference, no team has won multiple titles.

== Format history ==
The format of the Collegiate Conference didn't have any major changes; only using two formats across both the women's and men's divisions.

In 2017, the women's division divided the teams into two separate pools. The teams will then play a single round-robin tournament, playing all other teams once. The top two teams in each pool advanced to the final round, where they begin at the crossover semifinals with the first-seeded team being matched against the second-seed from the other group. The men's division didn't have the teams separated into pools and instead played in a single round-robin against each other, with the top four advancing to the final round. In the semifinals, first-seed played against the fourth-seed while the second-seed played against the third-seed.

In 2018, the both divisions used a single pool similar to the 2017 men's format. In 2019, the women's division reverted back to the two-pool format.

== Medal table ==
=== Women's division ===
==== Per season ====
Season	Champions	Runners-up	Third place	Details	Ref.
2017	NU Lady Bulldogs	FEU Lady Tamaraws	Arellano Lady Chiefs	2017 Collegiate	
2018	UP Lady Fighting Maroons	FEU Lady Tamaraws	Adamson Lady Falcons	2018 Collegiate	
2019	Adamson Lady Falcons	UST Golden Tigresses	Ateneo Lady Eagles	2019 Collegiate	

==== Per team ====
Team	Gold medal	Silver medal	Bronze medal	Total
Adamson Lady Falcons	1	0	1	2
NU Lady Bulldogs	1	0	0	1
UP Lady Fighting Maroons	1	0	0	1
FEU Lady Tamaraws	0	2	0	2
UST Golden Tigresses	0	1	0	1
Arellano Lady Chiefs	0	0	1	1
Ateneo Lady Eagles	0	0	1	1
