= Premier Volleyball League Finals Most Valuable Player award =

Premier Volleyball League award

The Premier Volleyball League Finals Most Valuable Player award is a Premier Volleyball League award given to the best performing player of each conference's finals series. The award has been given since the league's first conference in 2017.

As of the 2024–25 All-Filipino Conference, Jia Morado-de Guzman won the most Finals MVPs with four. MJ Phillips and Bernadeth Pons are the only other players to win multiple Finals MVPs with two each.

== Key ==
^	Denotes player who is still active in the PVL
Player (#)	Denotes the number of times the player has been named Finals MVP
Team (#)	Denotes the number of times a player from this team has won

== Winners ==
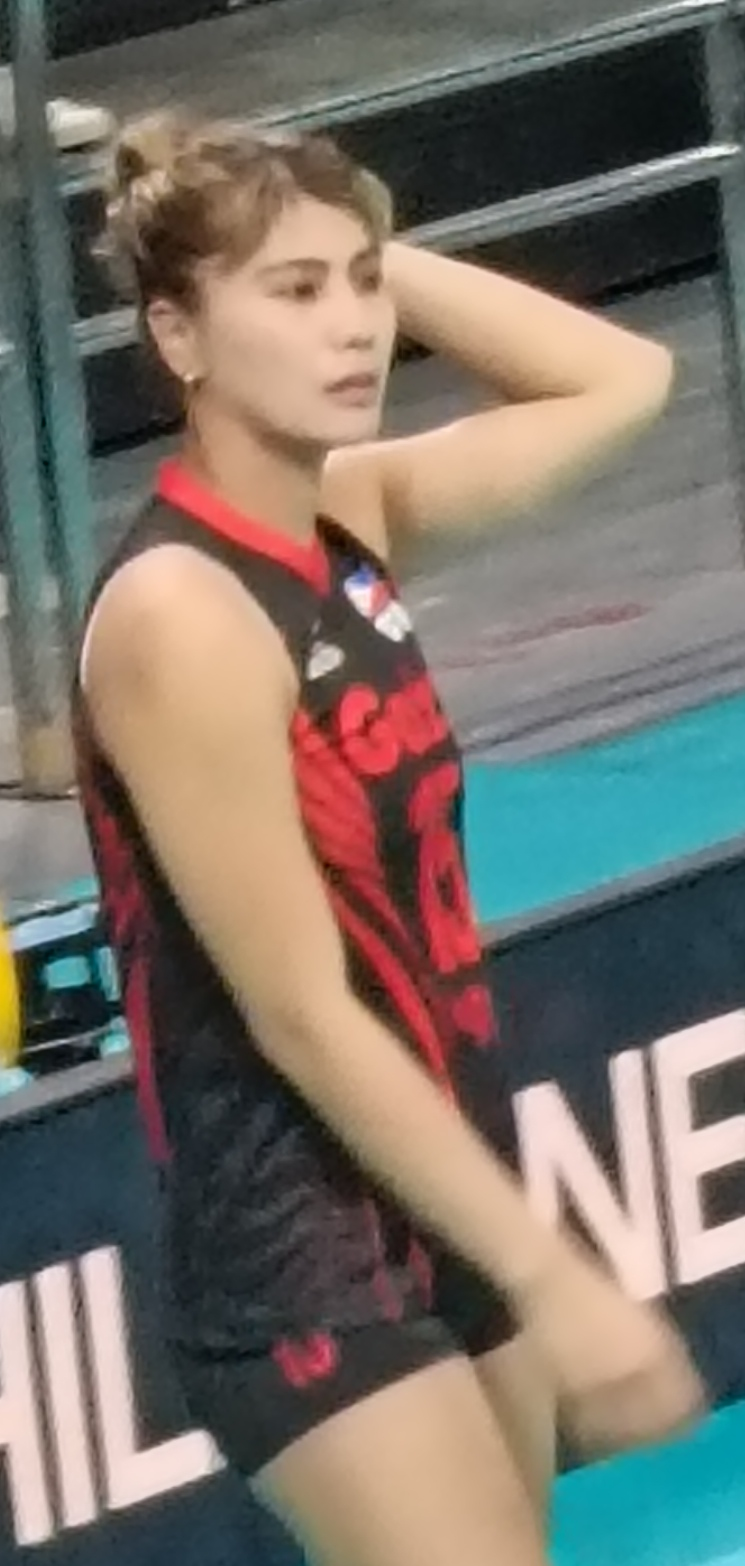
Myla Pablo was the league's first Finals MVP.

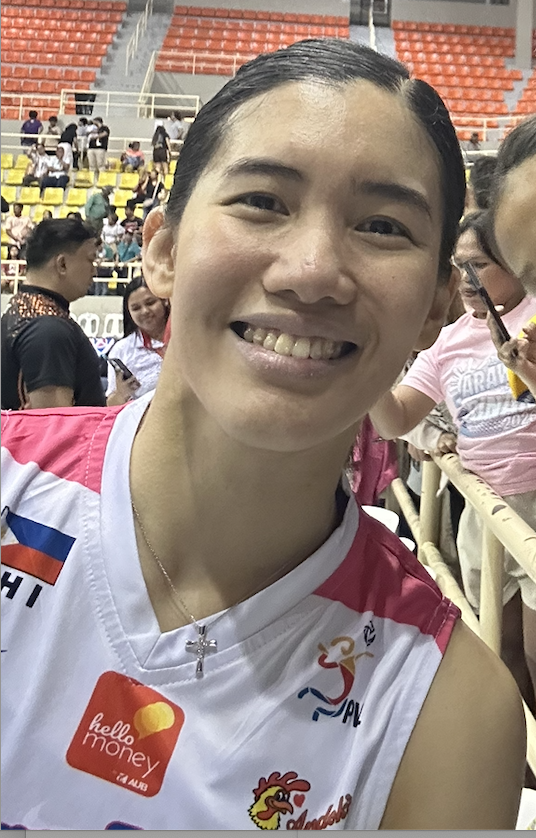
Jia Morado-de Guzman won four Finals MVP awards, the most of any player.

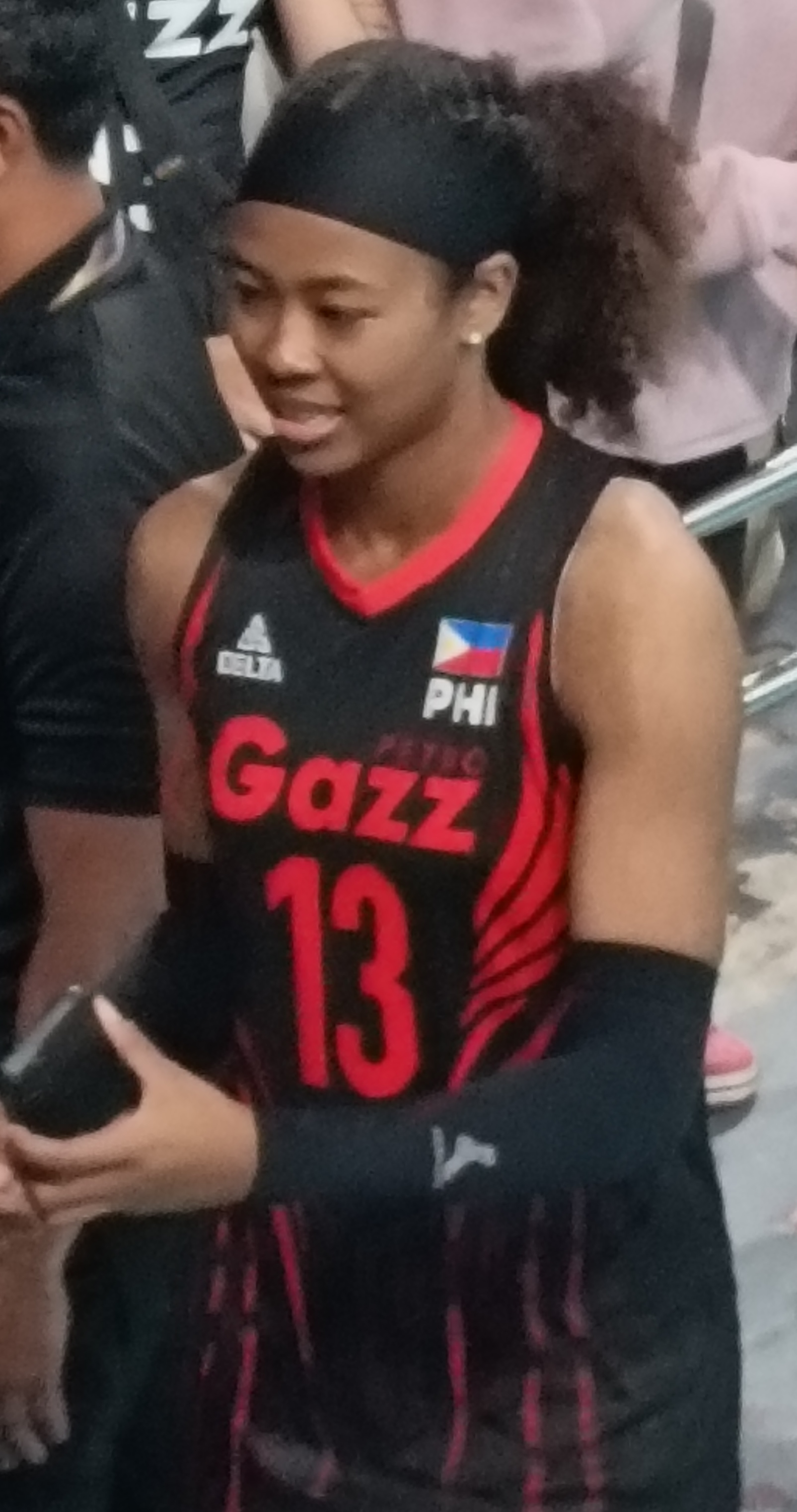
MJ Phillips is one of three players to win at least two Finals MVP awards in the women's division.

Season	Conference	Player	Nat.	Team	Ref.
2017	Reinforced	Myla Pablo^	(Philippines)	Pocari Sweat Lady Warriors	
2017	Open	Grethcel Soltones^	(Philippines)	BaliPure Purest Water Defenders	
2017	Collegiate	Jasmine Nabor^	(Philippines)	NU Lady Bulldogs	
2018	Reinforced	Jia Morado^	(Philippines)	Creamline Cool Smashers	
2018	Collegiate	Isa Molde^	(Philippines)	UP Fighting Maroons	
2018	Open	Jia Morado^ (2)	(Philippines)	Creamline Cool Smashers (2)	
2019	Reinforced	Janisa Johnson	(United States)	Petro Gazz Angels	
2019	Open	Jia Morado^ (3)	(Philippines)	Creamline Cool Smashers (3)	
2019	Collegiate	Louie Romero^	(Philippines)	Adamson Lady Falcons	
2021	Open	Alyja Santiago	(Philippines)	Chery Tiggo Crossovers	
2022	Open	Alyssa Valdez^	(Philippines)	Creamline Cool Smashers (4)	
2022	Invitational	Celine Domingo^	(Philippines)	Creamline Cool Smashers (5)	
2022	Reinforced	Lindsey Vander Weide	(United States)	Petro Gazz Angels (2)	
2023	1st All-Filipino	Jia de Guzman^ (4)	(Philippines)	Creamline Cool Smashers (6)	
2023	Invitational	Kyoka Ohshima	(Japan)	Kurashiki Ablaze	
2023	2nd All-Filipino	Tots Carlos^	(Philippines)	Creamline Cool Smashers (7)	
2024–25	2024 All-Filipino	Jessica Galanza^	(Philippines)	Creamline Cool Smashers (8)	
2024–25	Reinforced	Bernadeth Pons^	(Philippines)	Creamline Cool Smashers (9)	
2024–25	Invitational	Kyle Negrito^	(Philippines)	Creamline Cool Smashers (10)	
2024–25	2024–25 All-Filipino	MJ Phillips^	(Philippines) (United States)	Petro Gazz Angels (3)	
2025–26	PVL on Tour	Mika Reyes^	(Philippines)	PLDT High Speed Hitters	
2025–26	Invitational	Kath Arado^	(Philippines)	PLDT High Speed Hitters (2)	
2025–26	Reinforced	MJ Phillips^ (2)	(Philippines) (United States)	Petro Gazz Angels (4)	
2025–26	All-Filipino	Bernadeth Pons^ (2)	(Philippines)	Creamline Cool Smashers (11)	

== Multi-time winners ==
Awards	Player	Team(s)	Conferences
4	(Philippines) Jia Morado-de Guzman	Creamline Cool Smashers	2018 Reinforced, 2018 Open, 2019 Open, 2023 1st All-Filipino
2	(Philippines) (United States) MJ Phillips	Petro Gazz Angels	2024–25 All-Filipino, 2025 Reinforced
2	(Philippines) Bernadeth Pons	Creamline Cool Smashers	2024 Reinforced, 2026 All-Filipino

== Teams ==
Awards	Team	Conferences
11	Creamline Cool Smashers	2018 Reinforced, 2018 Open, 2019 Open, 2022 Open, 2022 Invitational, 2023 1st All-Filipino, 2023 2nd All-Filipino, 2024 All-Filipino, 2024 Reinforced, 2024 Invitational, 2026 All-Filipino
4	Petro Gazz Angels	2019 Reinforced, 2022 Reinforced, 2024–25 All-Filipino, 2025 Reinforced
2	PLDT High Speed Hitters	2025 PVL on Tour, 2025 Invitational

== See also ==
- Spikers' Turf Finals Most Valuable Player award
