= 2018 Premier Volleyball League Open Conference =

Third conference of the 2018 PVL season

- Duration: September 22 – December 8, 2018
- Teams: 8
- Matches: 65
- Attendance: 56,834 (874 per match)
- TV partner(s): S+A; Liga

Results
- Champions: Creamline Cool Smashers
- Runners-up: Ateneo–Motolite Lady Eagles
- Third place: BanKo Perlas Spikers
- Fourth place: Petro Gazz Angels

Awards
- Conference MVP: Alyssa Valdez
- Finals MVP: Jia Morado
- Best OH: Alyssa Valdez; Jema Galanza
- Best MB: Maddie Madayag; Kathy Bersola
- Best OPP: Katrina Tolentino
- Best Setter: Jia Morado
- Best Libero: Cienne Cruz

PVL Open Conference chronology
- < 2017 2019 >

PVL conference chronology
- < 2018 Collegiate 2019 Reinforced >

The 2018 Premier Volleyball League Open Conference was the sixth conference of the Premier Volleyball League and the third and final conference of the 2018 season. The conference started on September 22, 2018 at the Filoil Flying V Centre, San Juan, Metro Manila, Philippines.

Teams played a double-round robin elimination round to determine the final four teams that will advance to the semifinals.

== Participating teams ==
2018 Premier Volleyball League Open Conference
| Abbr. | Team | Company | Head coach | Team captain |
|---|---|---|---|---|
| ADM | Ateneo–Motolite Lady Eagles | Ateneo de Manila University / Motolite (sponsor) | (Philippines) Oliver Almadro | (Philippines) Bea de Leon |
| ADU | Adamson–Akari Lady Falcons | Adamson University / Akari Lighting and Technology Corporation (sponsor) | (United States) Airess Padda | (Philippines) Lea Ann Perez |
| BKP | BanKo Perlas Spikers | Beach Volleyball Republic / BPI Direct BanKo, Inc. (sponsor) | (Philippines) Ariel dela Cruz | (Philippines) Sue Roces |
| CCS | Creamline Cool Smashers | Republic Biscuit Corporation | (Thailand) Tai Bundit | (Philippines) Alyssa Valdez |
| IRG | Iriga City–Navy Oragons | Iriga City / Philippine Navy | (Philippines) Edgardo Rusit | (Philippines) Grazielle Bombita |
| PGZ | Petro Gazz Angels | PetroGazz Ventures Phils. Corp. | (Philippines) Jerry Yee | (Philippines) Stephanie Mercado |
| POC | Pocari Sweat–Air Force Lady Warriors | Federated Distributors, Inc. | (Philippines) Jasper Jimenez | (Philippines) Myla Pablo |
| TAC | Tacloban Fighting Warays | Bounty Agro Ventures, Inc. (sponsor) | (Philippines) Ernesto Pamilar | (Philippines) Jovie Prado |

== Format ==
Preliminary round

The eight teams compete in a single round-robin tournament, with each team playing one match against all other teams for a total of seven matches. The top four teams will advance to the semifinals while the bottom four will be eliminated and ranked 5th through 8th in the final standings.

Semifinals

The top four teams from the preliminary round compete in the semifinals. Teams compete in best-of-three series with the winners advancing to the finals while the losers will compete in the third place series. The match-ups for the semifinals are as follows:

- SF1: PR #1 vs. PR #4
- SF2: PR #2 vs. PR #3

Third place series

The losing teams from the semifinals compete in a best-of-three series to determine which team will finish third in this conference. If the series is tied at 1–1 when the championship is decided, the pool standing procedure will be used (starting from set ratio).

Finals

The winning teams from the semifinals compete in a best-of-three series to determine the conference champions. The losing team in this round will be declared conference runners-up.

== Pool standing procedure ==
Teams are initially ranked by wins followed by match points. A win awards three points if the match lasted for three or four sets (3–0 or 3–1), or two points if the match lasted for five sets (3–2). A loss only awards one point if the match lasted for five sets (2–3).

If multiple teams tie for wins and match points, the next criteria are set ratio (the number of sets won divided by number of sets lost across all matches) and point ratio (the number of points won divided by number of points lost across all matches). If any teams are still tied, the procedure will be applied again, but only considering matches between the remaining tied teams.

== Preliminary round ==
Team standings

| Pos | Team | Pld | W | L | Pts | SW | SL | SR | SPW | SPL | SPR | Qualification |
|---|---|---|---|---|---|---|---|---|---|---|---|---|
| 1 | Creamline Cool Smashers | 14 | 11 | 3 | 34 | 39 | 13 | 3.000 | 1202 | 936 | 1.284 | Semifinals |
| 2 | BanKo Perlas Spikers | 14 | 11 | 3 | 32 | 35 | 18 | 1.944 | 1208 | 1105 | 1.093 | Semifinals |
| 3 | Ateneo–Motolite Lady Eagles | 14 | 10 | 4 | 26 | 31 | 23 | 1.348 | 1178 | 1162 | 1.014 | Semifinals |
| 4 | PetroGazz Angels | 14 | 8 | 6 | 27 | 33 | 22 | 1.500 | 1202 | 1142 | 1.053 | Semifinals |
| 5 | Pocari Sweat Air Force Lady Warriors | 14 | 7 | 7 | 22 | 31 | 27 | 1.148 | 1263 | 1247 | 1.013 | |
| 6 | Tacloban Fighting Warays | 14 | 6 | 8 | 17 | 25 | 30 | 0.833 | 1178 | 1167 | 1.009 | |
| 7 | Iriga City–Navy Oragons | 14 | 3 | 11 | 8 | 11 | 36 | 0.306 | 927 | 1134 | 0.817 | |
| 8 | Adamson Lady Falcons | 14 | 0 | 14 | 2 | 6 | 42 | 0.143 | 875 | 1151 | 0.760 | |

Rules for classification: Point system: 3 points = win match in 3 or 4 sets; 2 points = win match in 5 sets; 1 point = lose match in 5 sets; 0 point = lose match in 3 or 4 sets

Match results

- All times are in Philippines Standard Time (UTC+08:00)

| Date | Time | | Score | | Set 1 | Set 2 | Set 3 | Set 4 | Set 5 | Total | Report |
|---|---|---|---|---|---|---|---|---|---|---|---|
| Sep 22 | 16:00 | Tacloban Fighting Warays | 0–3 | Petro Gazz Angels | 22–25 | 14–25 | 24–26 | | | 60–76 | P–2 |
| Sep 22 | 18:00 | BanKo Perlas Spikers | 3–1 | Iriga City–Navy Oragons | 25–14 | 19–25 | 25–17 | 25–9 | | 94–65 | P–2 |
| Sep 23 | 16:00 | Ateneo-Motolite Lady Eagles | 3–1 | Pocari Sweat–Air Force Lady Warriors | 25–23 | 17–25 | 25–20 | 30–28 | | 97–96 | P–2 |
| Sep 23 | 18:00 | Petro Gazz Angels | 1–3 | BanKo Perlas Spikers | 22–25 | 17–25 | 25–22 | 17–25 | | 81–97 | P–2 |
| Sep 26 | 16:00 | Iriga City–Navy Oragons | 0–3 | Tacloban Fighting Warays | 17–25 | 17–25 | 19–25 | | | 53–75 | P–2 |
| Sep 26 | 18:00 | Pocari Sweat–Air Force Lady Warriors | 3–2 | Petro Gazz Angels | 25–20 | 29–31 | 25–15 | 17–25 | 15–5 | 111–96 | P–2 |
| Sep 29 | 16:00 | Iriga City–Navy Oragons | 0–3 | Pocari Sweat–Air Force Lady Warriors | 18–25 | 18–25 | 20–25 | | | 56–75 | P–2 |
| Sep 29 | 18:00 | Creamline Cool Smashers | 2–3 | Petro Gazz Angels | 25–27 | 25–17 | 23–25 | 25–19 | 5–15 | 103–103 | P–2 |
| Sep 30 | 16:00 | Tacloban Fighting Warays | 3–0 | Adamson–Akari Lady Falcons | 25–21 | 25–12 | 25–22 | | | 75–55 | P–2 |
| Sep 30 | 18:00 | Petro Gazz Angels | 3–1 | Iriga City–Navy Oragons | 25–19 | 25–20 | 23–25 | 28–26 | | 101–90 | P–2 a |
| Oct 03 | 16:00 | Adamson–Akari Lady Falcons | 0–3 | Pocari Sweat–Air Force Lady Warriors | 23–25 | 22–25 | 16–25 | | | 61–75 | P–2 |
| Oct 03 | 18:00 | Creamline Cool Smashers | 3–0 | Tacloban Fighting Warays | 25–15 | 25–21 | 25–15 | | | 75–51 | P–2 |
| Oct 06 | 16:00 | Ateneo-Motolite Lady Eagles | 3–2 | Petro Gazz Angels | 25–21 | 17–25 | 19–25 | 25–14 | 15–7 | 101–92 | P–2 |
| Oct 06 | 18:00 | Adamson–Akari Lady Falcons | 1–3 | BanKo Perlas Spikers | 20–25 | 25–19 | 22–25 | 16–25 | | 83–94 | P–2 |
| Oct 07 | 16:00 | BanKo Perlas Spikers | 3–0 | Ateneo-Motolite Lady Eagles | 27–25 | 25–19 | 25–11 | | | 77–55 | P–2 |
| Oct 07 | 18:00 | Creamline Cool Smashers | 3–0 | Iriga City–Navy Oragons | 25–13 | 25–12 | 25–9 | | | 75–34 | P–2 |
| Oct 10 | 16:00 | Tacloban Fighting Warays | 1–3 | BanKo Perlas Spikers | 21–25 | 25–23 | 27–29 | 18–25 | | 91–102 | P–2 |
| Oct 10 | 18:00 | Adamson–Akari Lady Falcons | 0–3 | Creamline Cool Smashers | 16–25 | 9–25 | 20–25 | | | 45–75 | P–2 |
| Oct 13 | 16:00 | Ateneo-Motolite Lady Eagles | 3–0 | Iriga City–Navy Oragons | 25–19 | 29–27 | 25–14 | | | 79–60 | P–2 |
| Oct 13 | 18:00 | Petro Gazz Angels | 3–0 | Adamson–Akari Lady Falcons | 25–17 | 25–20 | 25–14 | | | 75–51 | P–2 |
| Oct 14 | 16:00 | Adamson–Akari Lady Falcons | 2–3 | Ateneo-Motolite Lady Eagles | 25–17 | 23–25 | 20–25 | 25–21 | 12–15 | 105–103 | P–2 |
| Oct 14 | 18:00 | Creamline Cool Smashers | 3–2 | Pocari Sweat–Air Force Lady Warriors | 25–19 | 25–17 | 20–25 | 16–25 | 16–14 | 102–100 | P–2 |
| Oct 17 | 16:00 | Ateneo-Motolite Lady Eagles | 3–2 | Tacloban Fighting Warays | 25–18 | 19–25 | 11–25 | 25–17 | 15–11 | 95–96 | P–2 |
| Oct 17 | 18:00 | BanKo Perlas Spikers | 0–3 | Creamline Cool Smashers | 24–26 | 13–25 | 21–25 | | | 58–76 | P–2 |
| Oct 20 | 16:00 | Tacloban Fighting Warays | 3–2 | Pocari Sweat–Air Force Lady Warriors | 18–25 | 25–20 | 25–22 | 20–25 | 15–9 | 103–101 | P–2 |
| Oct 20 | 18:00 | Iriga City–Navy Oragons | 3–2 | Adamson–Akari Lady Falcons | 25–18 | 23–25 | 25–21 | 24–26 | 15–11 | 112–101 | P–2 |
| Oct 21 | 16:00 | Pocari Sweat–Air Force Lady Warriors | 3–2 | BanKo Perlas Spikers | 16–25 | 26–24 | 18–25 | 25–23 | 15–13 | 100–110 | P–2 |
| Oct 21 | 18:00 | Ateneo-Motolite Lady Eagles | 0–3 | Creamline Cool Smashers | 23–25 | 17–25 | 14–25 | | | 54–75 | P–2 |
| Oct 24 | 16:00 | BanKo Perlas Spikers | 3–0 | Iriga City–Navy Oragons | 25–22 | 25–21 | 25–19 | | | 75–62 | P–2 |
| Oct 24 | 18:00 | Pocari Sweat–Air Force Lady Warriors | 2–3 | Tacloban Fighting Warays | 25–20 | 13–25 | 26–24 | 16–25 | 13–15 | 93–109 | P–2 |
| Oct 27 | 16:00 | Iriga City–Navy Oragons | 3–0 | Adamson–Akari Lady Falcons | 25–18 | 26–24 | 25–23 | | | 76–65 | P–2 |
| Oct 27 | 18:00 | Pocari Sweat–Air Force Lady Warriors | 0–3 | Ateneo-Motolite Lady Eagles | 25–27 | 21–25 | 21–25 | | | 67–77 | P–2 |
| Oct 28 | 16:00 | Tacloban Fighting Warays | 1–3 | Iriga City–Navy Oragons | 20–25 | 25–15 | 25–27 | 23–25 | | 93–92 | P–2 |
| Oct 28 | 18:00 | Ateneo-Motolite Lady Eagles | 3–2 | Creamline Cool Smashers | 25–18 | 25–20 | 15–25 | 23–25 | 15–12 | 103–100 | P–2 |
| Nov 03 | 16:00 | Ateneo-Motolite Lady Eagles | 3–1 | Tacloban Fighting Warays | 25–19 | 25–21 | 21–25 | 25–19 | | 96–84 | P–2 |
| Nov 03 | 18:00 | Petro Gazz Angels | 3–0 | Iriga City–Navy Oragons | 25–21 | 25–19 | 25–17 | | | 75–57 | P–2 |
| Nov 04 | 16:00 | BanKo Perlas Spikers | 3–0 | Adamson–Akari Lady Falcons | 25–17 | 25–17 | 25–18 | | | 75–52 | P–2 |
| Nov 04 | 18:00 | Iriga City–Navy Oragons | 0–3 | Ateneo-Motolite Lady Eagles | 17–25 | 19–25 | 22–25 | | | 58–75 | P–2 |
| Nov 07 | 16:00 | Petro Gazz Angels | 2–3 | Pocari Sweat–Air Force Lady Warriors | 25–17 | 29–27 | 16–25 | 23–25 | 13–15 | 106–109 | P–2 |
| Nov 07 | 18:00 | Creamline Cool Smashers | 3–0 | Tacloban Fighting Warays | 25–16 | 25–16 | 26–24 | | | 76–56 | P–2 |
| Nov 10 | 16:00 | Tacloban Fighting Warays | 3–2 | Petro Gazz Angels | 15–25 | 25–23 | 22–25 | 25–20 | 15–13 | 102–106 | P–2 |
| Nov 10 | 18:00 | Ateneo-Motolite Lady Eagles | 0–3 | BanKo Perlas Spikers | 24–26 | 22–25 | 16–25 | | | 62–76 | P–2 |
| Nov 11 | 14:00 | Pocari Sweat–Air Force Lady Warriors | 2–3 | Creamline Cool Smashers | 25–23 | 21–25 | 20–25 | 25–22 | 9–15 | 100–110 | P–2 |
| Nov 11 | 16:00 | Adamson–Akari Lady Falcons | 1–3 | Ateneo-Motolite Lady Eagles | 23–25 | 25–16 | 14–25 | 20–25 | | 82–91 | P–2 |
| Nov 11 | 18:00 | BanKo Perlas Spikers | 0–3 | Petro Gazz Angels | 11–25 | 23–25 | 18–25 | | | 52–75 | P–2 |
| Nov 14 | 16:00 | Pocari Sweat–Air Force Lady Warriors | 1–3 | BanKo Perlas Spikers | 25–27 | 25–19 | 16–25 | 20–25 | | 86–96 | P–2 |
| Nov 14 | 18:00 | Iriga City–Navy Oragons | 0–3 | Creamline Cool Smashers | 12–25 | 13–25 | 24–26 | | | 49–76 | P–2 |
| Nov 17 | 16:00 | Creamline Cool Smashers | 2–3 | BanKo Perlas Spikers | 25–12 | 23–25 | 25–19 | 24–26 | 12–15 | 109–97 | P–2 |
| Nov 17 | 16:00 | Adamson–Akari Lady Falcons | 0–3 | Tacloban Fighting Warays | 11–25 | 12–25 | 19–25 | | | 42–75 | P–2 |
| Nov 17 | 18:00 | Ateneo-Motolite Lady Eagles | 1–3 | Petro Gazz Angels | 25–19 | 21–25 | 21–25 | 23–25 | | 90–94 | P–2 |
| Nov 18 | 16:00 | Iriga City–Navy Oragons | 0–3 | Pocari Sweat–Air Force Lady Warriors | 23–25 | 20–25 | 20–25 | | | 63–75 | P–2 |
| Nov 18 | 18:00 | Petro Gazz Angels | 3–0 | Adamson–Akari Lady Falcons | 25–21 | 25–9 | 25–15 | | | 75–45 | P–2 |
| Nov 21 | 16:00 | Adamson–Akari Lady Falcons | 0–3 | Pocari Sweat–Air Force Lady Warriors | 18–25 | 20–25 | 23–25 | | | 61–75 | P–2 |
| Nov 21 | 18:00 | Petro Gazz Angels | 0–3 | Creamline Cool Smashers | 11–25 | 13–25 | 23–25 | | | 47–75 | P–2 |
| Nov 24 | 16:00 | Tacloban Fighting Warays | 2–3 | BanKo Perlas Spikers | 22–25 | 19–25 | 31–29 | 25–11 | 11–15 | 108–105 | P–2 |
| Nov 24 | 18:00 | Creamline Cool Smashers | 3–0 | Adamson–Akari Lady Falcons | 25–7 | 25–11 | 25–10 | | | 75–28 | P–2 |

== Final round ==
- All series are best-of-three.

Semifinals
December 7–9
1 Creamline | 3 | 3
4 Petro Gazz | 1 | 1
December 7–12
2 BanKo | 3 | 0 | 2
3 Ateneo-Motolite | 2 | 3 | 3

Championship
December 14–16
Creamline | 3 | 3
Ateneo-Motolite | 0 | 0
3rd place match
December 14–16
Petro Gazz | 1 | 0
BanKo | 3 | 3

=== Semifinals ===
Rank 1 vs Rank 4

| Date | Time | | Score | | Set 1 | Set 2 | Set 3 | Set 4 | Set 5 | Total | Report |
|---|---|---|---|---|---|---|---|---|---|---|---|
| Nov 28 | 16:00 | Creamline Cool Smashers | 3–1 | Petro Gazz Angels | 26–28 | 25–15 | 25–13 | 25–16 | | 101–72 | P–2 |
| Dec 01 | 16:00 | Petro Gazz Angels | 1–3 | Creamline Cool Smashers | 25–21 | 18–25 | 21–25 | 13–25 | | 77–96 | P–2 |

Rank 2 vs Rank 3

| Date | Time | | Score | | Set 1 | Set 2 | Set 3 | Set 4 | Set 5 | Total | Report |
|---|---|---|---|---|---|---|---|---|---|---|---|
| Nov 28 | 18:30 | BanKo Perlas Spikers | 3–2 | Ateneo-Motolite Lady Eagles | 25–23 | 25–19 | 21–25 | 19–25 | 15–6 | 105–98 | P–2 |
| Dec 01 | 14:00 | Ateneo-Motolite Lady Eagles | 3–0 | BanKo Perlas Spikers | 25–21 | 25–20 | 26–24 | | | 76–65 | P–2 |
| Dec 02 | 16:00 | BanKo Perlas Spikers | 2–3 | Ateneo-Motolite Lady Eagles | 25–21 | 25–23 | 17–25 | 25–27 | 19–21 | 111–117 | P–2 |

=== Finals ===
3rd Place

| Date | Time | | Score | | Set 1 | Set 2 | Set 3 | Set 4 | Set 5 | Total | Report |
|---|---|---|---|---|---|---|---|---|---|---|---|
| Dec 05 | 16:00 | BanKo Perlas Spikers | 3–1 | Petro Gazz Angels | 25–14 | 28–26 | 10–25 | 25–19 | | 88–84 | P–2 |
| Dec 08 | 14:00 | Petro Gazz Angels | 0–3 | BanKo Perlas Spikers | 18–25 | 24–26 | 21–25 | | | 63–76 | P–2 |

Championships

| Date | Time | | Score | | Set 1 | Set 2 | Set 3 | Set 4 | Set 5 | Total | Report |
|---|---|---|---|---|---|---|---|---|---|---|---|
| Dec 05 | 18:30 | Creamline Cool Smashers | 3–0 | Ateneo-Motolite Lady Eagles | 25–17 | 25–10 | 25–15 | | | 75–42 | P–2 |
| Dec 08 | 16:00 | Ateneo-Motolite Lady Eagles | 0–3 | Creamline Cool Smashers | 20–25 | 20–25 | 15–25 | | | 55–75 | P–2 |

== Awards ==
| Award | | Player | Ref. |
|---|---|---|---|
| Most Valuable Player | Finals | Jia Morado (Creamline) | |
| Most Valuable Player | Conference | Alyssa Valdez (Creamline) | |
| Best Outside Spikers | 1st: 2nd: | Alyssa Valdez (Creamline); Jema Galanza (Creamline) | |
| Best Middle Blockers | 1st: 2nd: | Maddie Madayag (Ateneo); Kathy Bersola (Perlas) | |
| Best Opposite Spiker | | Katrina Tolentino (Ateneo) | |
| Best Setter | | Jia Morado (Creamline) | |
| Best Libero | | Cienne Cruz (PetroGazz) | |

== Final standings ==
| Rank | Team |
|---|---|
| 1st place, gold medalist(s) | Creamline Cool Smashers |
| 2nd place, silver medalist(s) | Ateneo-Motolite Lady Eagles |
| 3rd place, bronze medalist(s) | BanKo Perlas Spikers |
| 4 | PetroGazz Angels |
| 5 | Pocari Sweat–Air Force Lady Warriors |
| 6 | Tacloban Fighting Warays |
| 7 | Iriga City–Navy Oragons |
| 8 | Adamson–Akari Lady Falcons |

2018 Premier Volleyball League Open champions

2nd title

Team Roster
Alyssa Valdez (C), Jia Morado, Jema Galanza, Risa Sato, Michele Gumabao, Pau Soriano, Melissa Gohing, Fille Cayetano, Paula Maninang, Coleen Bravo, Jem Gutierrez, Kyla Atienza, Alex Cabaños, Rizza Mandapat,
Head coach
Anusorn "Tai" Bundit

== See also ==
- 2018 Spikers’ Turf Open Conference
