= Eli Soyud =

Filipino volleyball player

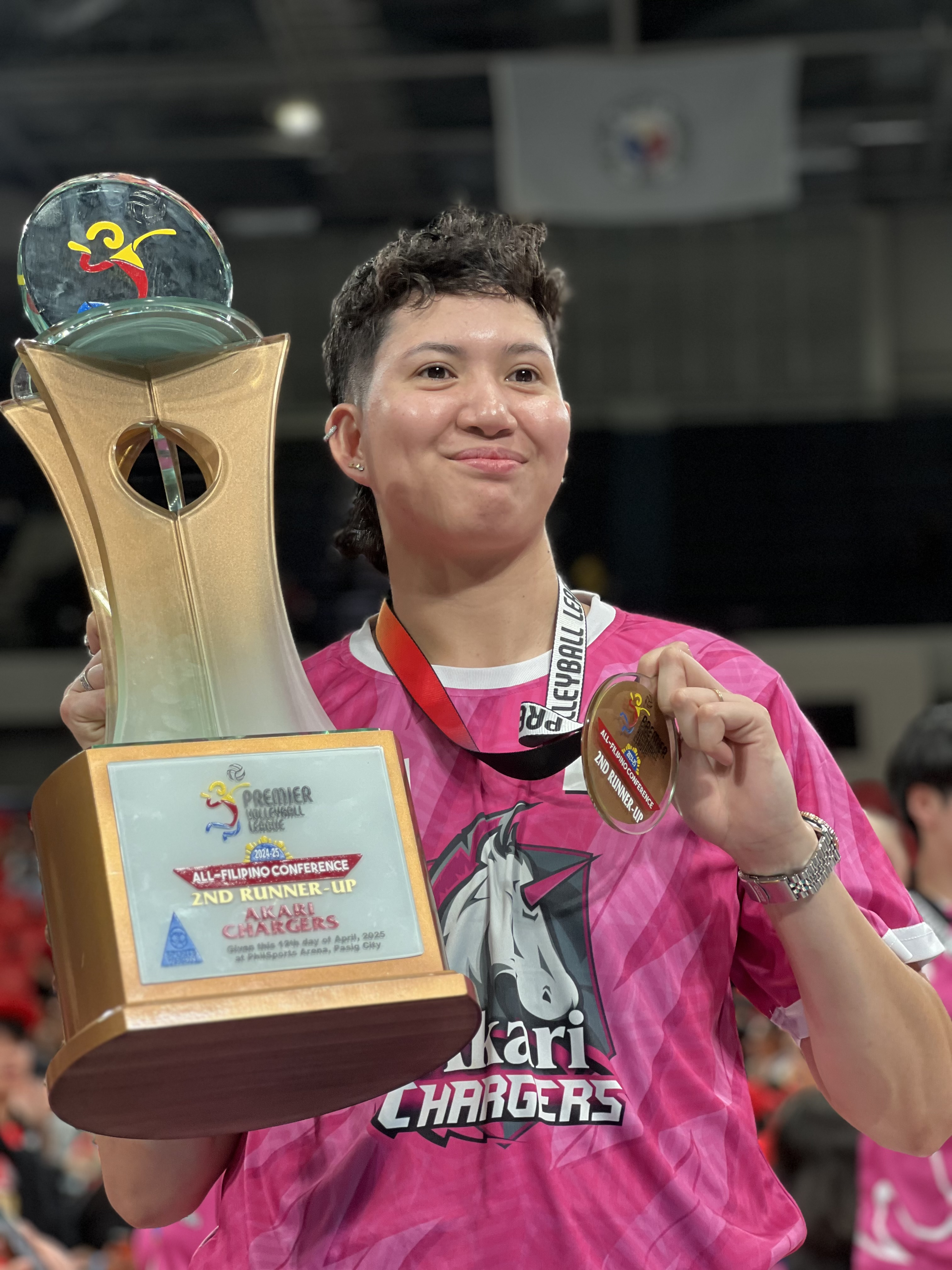

Personal information
- Nationality: Filipino
- Born: December 27, 1995 (age 30)
- Home town: Bago, Negros Occidental, Philippines
- Education: De La Salle University; Adamson University
- Height: 1.78 m (5 ft 10 in)

Volleyball information
- Position: Opposite hitter
- Current club: Akari Chargers

Christine Joy Soyud (born December 27, 1995) is a Filipino volleyball player. She is currently playing as an Opposite Hitter for the Akari Chargers in the PVL.

== Career ==
=== UAAP ===
Soyud made her first game appearance with De La Salle Lady Spikers in the UAAP Season 78. Her team won the title after beating Ateneo in Game 3 of the best of three series.

In 2017, she transferred in Adamson University and played for the Adamson Lady Falcons. She didn't play for the Adamson Lady Falcons in the UAAP Season 79 because she had to serve a one-year residency imposed by the University Athletic Association of the Philippines for transferring from a UAAP school (La Salle) to another (Adamson).

In 2018, she finally played for the Adamson Lady Falcons but they didn't enter the final four.

=== PVL ===
In 2018, Soyud played as an Outside hitter for the Sta. Lucia Lady Realtors in the PSL.

In 2019, she played as an Opposite Hitter for the Motolite Power Builders in the PVL. They finished 5th place on that season.

In 2020, she played for the Generika-Ayala Lifesavers in the PSL. The tournament was cancelled due to the COVID-19 pandemic.

In 2021, she transferred in PLDT Home Fibr Power Hitters in the 2021 PVL Open Conference, where they finished 7th place on that season.

In 2023, she was signed by the Akari Chargers. The press corps would later award Soyud Most Improved Player.

== Clubs ==
- (Philippines) Sta. Lucia Lady Realtors (2018)
- (Philippines) Motolite Power Builders (2019)
- (Philippines) Generika-Ayala Lifesavers (2020)
- (Philippines) PLDT Home Fibr Hitters (2021–2023)
- (Philippines) Akari Chargers (2023–present)

== Awards ==
=== Individual ===
Year	League	Season/Conference	Award	Ref
2017	PVL	Collegiate	1st Best Outside Spiker	
2018	PVL	Collegiate	Best Opposite Spiker	
2024-25	PVL	All-Filipino	Most Improved Player	

=== Collegiate ===
Year	League	Season/Conference	Collegiate Team	Title	Ref
2015	UAAP	UAAP Season 77	De La Salle Lady Spikers	Runner-up	
2016	UAAP	UAAP Season 78	De La Salle Lady Spikers	Champions	
2018	PVL	Collegiate	Adamson Lady Falcons	3rd Place	

=== Clubs ===
Year	League	Season/Conference	Club	Title	Ref
2024	PVL	Reinforced	Akari Chargers	Runner-up	
2024–25	PVL	All-Filipino	Akari Chargers	3rd place	
