= 2019 Premier Volleyball League Collegiate Conference =

Third conference of the 2019 PVL season

- Duration: August 17 – October 12, 2019
- Teams: 12
- Matches: 40
- Attendance: 8,593 (215 per match)
- TV partner(s): S+A; Liga

Results
- Champions: Adamson Lady Falcons
- Runners-up: UST Golden Tigresses
- Third place: Ateneo Lady Eagles
- Fourth place: Benilde Lady Blazers

Awards
- Conference MVP: Trisha Genesis
- Finals MVP: Louie Romero
- Best OH: Trisha Genesis; Faith Nisperos
- Best MB: Lorene Toring; Imee Hernandez
- Best OPP: Klarissa Abriam
- Best Setter: Janel Maraguinot
- Best Libero: Arianne Daguil

PVL Collegiate Conference chronology
- < 2018 2022 (V-League) >

PVL conference chronology
- < 2019 Open 2021 Open >

The 2019 Premier Volleyball League Collegiate Conference was the ninth conference of the James Acorda Championship Followed by Ashley Magsigay League Premier Volleyball League and the third and final conference of the 2019 season. The conference started on August 17, 2019, and ended on October 12, 2019, at the Filoil Flying V Centre, San Juan, Metro Manila, Philippines. Defending champions University of the Philippines skipped this conference, while reigning University Athletic Association of the Philippines champion Ateneo de Manila University returned after sitting out the 2018 collegiate conference.

This conference ran simultaneously with the 2019 Open Conference. It was also the last time the Collegiate Conference was held in the PVL. After the league turned pro, collegiate teams instead competed in the relaunched V-League from 2022 onwards.

== Participating teams ==
2019 Premier Volleyball League Collegiate Conference
Abbr.	Team	Head coach	Team Captain
ADU	Adamson Lady Falcons	Lerma Giron	Louie Romero
ADM	Ateneo Lady Eagles	Oliver Allan Almadro	Julianne Marie Samonte
AUN	Arellano Lady Chiefs	Roberto Javier	Sarah Princess Verutiao
CSB	Benilde Lady Blazers	Arnold Laniog	Hannah Jewel Lai
CSJ	Letran Lady Knights	Michael Inoferio	Marie Charlemagne Simborio
FEU	FEU Lady Tamaraws	George Pascua	Maria Angelica Cayuna
LPU	Lyceum Lady Pirates	Emiliano "Emil" Lontoc	Ciarnelle Wanta
SBU	San Beda Red Lionesses	Nemesio Gavino Jr.	Cesca Racraquin
SSC	San Sebastian Lady Stags	Roger Gorayeb	Mary Rhose Dapol
TIP	TIP Lady Engineers	Achilles "Boy" Paril	Alexandra Loiuse Rosales
UPH	Perpetual Lady Altas	Michael Cariño	Shyra Mae Umandal
UST	UST Golden Tigresses	Emilio "Kungfu" Reyes Jr.	Kecelyn Galdones

== Pool composition ==
Pool A	Pool B
Adamson Lady Falcons	Arellano Lady Chiefs
Ateneo Lady Eagles	Benilde Lady Blazers
Letran Lady Knights	FEU Lady Tamaraws
San Beda Red Lionesses	Lyceum Lady Pirates
San Sebastian Lady Stags	TIP Lady Engineers
Perpetual Lady Altas	UST Golden Tigresses

== Squads ==
Legend
S	Setter
MH	Middle Hitter
OH	Outside Hitter
OP	Opposite Hitter
L	Libero
(c)	Team Captain
HC	Head coach

Pool – A

Adamson Lady Falcons
No.	Name	Position
2	GENESIS, Trisha Mae	OH
4	CRUZ, Rizza	OH
5	ROMERO, Louie (c)	S
6	PINAR, Ceasa Joria	OP
7	MARTINEZ, Shynna	MB
8	ADOLFO, Antonette	OP
9	ALMONTE, Lucille May	OH
10	VERDEFLOR, Joanhna Karen	L
11	IGAO, Mary Jane	S
13	LAZO, Cae	L
15	INFANTE, Hannah Nicole	OH
16	APRECIO, Martina Lucida	MB
17	AVE, Gracelchen	OH
18	TORING, Lorence Grace	MB
	GIRON, Lerma	HC

Ateneo Lady Eagles
No.	Name	Position
1	RAVENA, Danielle Theris	L
4	SAMONTE, Julianne Marie (c)	MB
5	GANDLER, Vanessa	OH
6	MARAGUINOT, Janel	S
7	CRUZ, Kiara Cyrene	S
8	DELOS REYES, Jaycel Ann	MB
9	GASTON, Pauline Marie Monique	OH
10	NARIT, Joan Decemary	MB
11	RAAGAS, Erika Beatriz	OH
12	NAVARRO, Sofia Ysabel	MB
14	PARALE, Patricia Marie	MB
17	NISPEROS, Faith Janine Shirley	OH
18	COLOSO, Erika Gabrielle	MB
20	DOROMAL, Roma Mae	OH
	ALMADRO, Oliver Allan	HC

Letran Lady Knights
No.	Name	Position
1	SANTOS, Erika Mae	
2	CASTRO, Julliene	
3	SIMBORIO, Marie Charlemagne (c)	OH
5	DELA CRUZ, Kathleen	
6	ANGELES, Julia	L
7	CUNADA, Chamberlaine	
9	URMENETA, Shereena	
10	ROCACURVA, Moana Marie	L
11	OHYA, Dane Iam	
12	MIRANDA, Kristine Joy	
16	MUSNGI, Edma Ann	S
17	MONTEAGUDO, Khryss Anne	
18	MELENDRES, Daisy	
19	TAPANG, Lea Rizel	
	INOFERIO, Michael	HC

San Beda Red Lionesses
No.	Name	Position
1	MATIAS, Lynn Robyn	S
2	TANNAGAN, China	OH
3	MANZANO, Kimberly Grace	
5	RACRAQUIN, Daryl Sigrid C.	L
6	MANALAC, Patricia Mae	
7	TAYAG, Maxine Koyce	
8	BUNO, Justine Marie	L
9	VIRAY, Maria Nieza C.	OH
10	GALANG, Mikaela Joy	MB
14	SALANGSANG, Francesca Louise	
15	CENZON, Patricia Ysabel	
16	VIRAY, Maria Jiezela C.	OP
17	DIOSO, Kyla Jeremae	
12	DOMINGO, Maria Aira	
18	RACRAQUIN, Aurea Francesca C. (c)	OH
22	LAPID, Justine	OH
	GAVINO, Nemesio Jr.	HC

San Sebastian Lady Stags
No.	Name	Position
1	DAPOL, Mary Rhose (c)	OH
2	CANETE, Reyann	
3	REQUIRME, Shannai Shane	MB
4	CONSUEGRA, Queene	
5	AREVALO, Coleen Dorothy	
6	TAN, Roxanne	L
7	CAPUTOLAN, Alla Mae	
9	SISON, Alexia Vea	S
10	TAN, Kamille Josephine Amaka	
11	LIM, Catherine Gabrielle	L
12	DELA CRUZ, Christine	
13	CARREON, Jamille Veronica	
14	ORDONA, Bianca	
19	BIGATA, Sherielyn	MB
	GORAYEB, Roger	HC

Perpetual Lady Altas
No.	Name	Position
1	TRIPOLI, Maria Aurora Blanca L.	OH
2	SANGGALANG, Alyssa G.	L
3	CERDENA, Noheli	
4	SALIMBACOD, Daisy	
5	CASTILLO, Maria Angelou	S
6	PADUA, Janine	
7	DAYAO, Sandra Beatriz	L
8	ROSAL, Jhonna I.	
11	ARCELLANA, Katrina	
12	UMANDAL, Shyra Mae A. (c)	OH
15	ALDEA, Razel Paula	MB
16	SCOTT, Charina	OH
17	GAVIOLA, Jenny	
20	PERSA, Dana Marie	
	CARIÑO, Michael	HC

Pool – B

Arellano Lady Chiefs
No.	Name	Position
1	BATINDAAN, Dodee Risa Joy	
2	DINO, Charmina	
3	ORTIZ, Joyce Marie	
4	JUANICH, Mikaela O.	MB
6	VERUTIAO, Sarah Princess (c)	S
7	FLORES, Faye Anne Marie	L
8	SAN GREGORIO, Allyna Marie	
9	BUEMIA, Cherry Anne	L
11	ABAY, Tricia Marice	
12	EBUEN, Necole	OP
13	AROCHA, Regine Anne	OH
14	SASUMAN, Nicole Victoria	
15	DONATO, Carla Amiana	
17	DAISOG, Alliah Grace	
	JAVIER, Roberto	HC

Benilde Lady Blazers
No.	Name	Position
1	LAI, Jewel Hannah (c)	S
2	PABLO, Maritess C.	OP
3	GAMIT, Michelle	MB
4	VENTURA, Diane J.	MB
5	UMALI, Chelsea Anne I.	MB
6	SULIT, Janella M.	L
7	MIRANDA, Kaila Gabrielle	
8	MONDONEDO, Cloanne	
9	PASCUAL, Gayle	OH
10	GO, Micah	MB
13	GENTAPA, Grace	OH
14	TUMANG, Jeanelle	OH
15	ABRIAM, Klarisa	OH
16	DAGUIL, Jan Arianne	L
	YEE, Jerry	HC

FEU Lady Tamaraws
No.	Name	Position
1	PEROLINO, Zenneth	OH
2	KISEO, Shiela Mae	OH
4	RONQUILLO, France Elize	OH
6	AGUDO, Ivana Marie	OP
7	GALLENTES, Sheena	
8	CAYUNA, Maria Angelica P. (c)	S
9	GALLO, Gillianne	L
10	MORA, Mary Martha Louis	
11	MADRIGAL, Princess Ezra	
12	FLORENDO, Allianne Lois	L
13	ALICER, Miyuki	
14	CARANDANG, Czarina Grace	MB
15	MIRALLES, Alyssa	OP
18	VILLAREAL, Jeanette Virginia P.	MB
19	DEJITO, Clavel	
	PASCUA, George	HC

Lyceum Lady Pirates
No.	Name	Position
2	ACUNA, Jacqueline	
4	STA. MARIA, Lois	
5	MAPULA, Melenie	L
7	GALENO, Carol Joy	L
8	TOCA, Franchesca	L
9	WANTA, Ciarnelle (c)	OH
10	RAFAEL, Alxandra	
11	BELARO, Camille	L
12	DOGUNA, Joan	
14	SEVILLA, Monica Jane	MB
15	PUZON, Venice	S
16	DAHAB, Zonki	
17	ONOFRE, Mary Joy	MB
18	AMAR, Elidel Rofe	
20	EXCIJA, Princess	
	LONTOC, Emiliano	HC

TIP Lady Engineers
No.	Name	Position
2	AGUSTIN, Andrea Claire Marie	
4	ROSALES, Patrice Anne	
5	ROSALES, Alexandra Louise (c)	S
6	CAHIGAO, Aixyel Myr	S
7	ESPINOSA, Sheena	L
8	MARGALLO, Wielyn	
9	MARTINEZ, Zyra Mae	OP
10	JINON, Ashley Jean	OH
11	ZARASPE, Justine Mae	
12	GULING, Olivia	L
13	VILLARMINO, Hannan	
14	TORINO, Cheene	
15	CONSENCINO, Khem	MB
16	MACATANGAY, Ayessa	MB
18	CARITATIVO, Sweet Angelie	MB
	PARIL, Achilles	HC

UST Golden Tigresses
No.	Name	Position
1	MARTIN, Rizalinda	L
2	TUAZON, Donna Mae	MB
4	ABUEG, Joyce	
5	HERNANDEZ, Imee	OH
8	LAURE, Ejiya	OH
9	LAURE, Ennajie	OH
11	GALANZA, Maria Fe	S
12	GALDONES, Kecelyn (c)	MB
15	ROLDAN, Rachelle	OH
16	MANGULABNAN, Ma. Agatha	S
17	RAAGAS, Martha	
18	TORRES, Janna	MB
19	BALCORTA, Janine	
20	RAAGAS, Rea	L
	REYES, Emilio Jr.	HC

== Format ==
Preliminary Round

1. The twelve teams are divided into 2 pools.
2. Teams will compete in a single round-robin elimination.
3. Teams are ranked using the FIVB Ranking System.
4. Top two teams in each pool will advance to the semifinals.

Semifinals

1. Best-of-three series.
2. A1 vs. B2
3. B1 vs. A2

Finals

1. Best-of-three series.
2. Bronze medal: SF1 Loser vs. SF2 Loser
3. Gold medal: SF1 Winner vs. SF2 Winner

== Pool standing procedure ==
- First, teams are ranked by the number of matches won.
- If the number of matches won is tied, the tied teams are then ranked by match points, wherein:
  - Match won 3–0 or 3–1: 3 match points for the winner, 0 match points for the loser.
  - Match won 3–2: 2 match points for the winner, 1 match point for the loser.
- In case of any further ties, the following criteria shall be used:
  - Set ratio: the number of sets won divided by number of sets lost.
  - Point ratio: number of points scored divided by number of points allowed.
  - Head-to-head standings: any remaining tied teams are ranked based on the results of head-to-head matches involving the teams in question.

== Preliminary round ==
=== Ranking ===
==== Pool A ====
Pos	Team	Pld	W	L	Pts	SW	SL	SR	SPW	SPL	SPR	Qualification
1	Adamson Lady Falcons	5	5	0	15	15	1	15.000	389	281	1.384	Semifinals
2	Ateneo Lady Eagles	5	4	1	12	13	5	2.600	428	315	1.359	Semifinals
3	San Beda Red Lionesses	5	3	2	8	10	8	1.250	379	379	1.000	
4	Perpetual Lady Altas	5	1	4	4	5	13	0.385	358	411	0.871	
5	Letran Lady Knights	5	1	4	3	7	14	0.500	419	485	0.864	
6	San Sebastian Lady Stags	5	1	4	3	4	13	0.308	316	418	0.756	

==== Pool B ====
Pos	Team	Pld	W	L	Pts	SW	SL	SR	SPW	SPL	SPR	Qualification
1	UST Golden Tigresses	5	5	0	13	15	5	3.000	455	372	1.223	Semifinals
2	Benilde Lady Blazers	5	4	1	13	14	3	4.667	407	314	1.296	Semifinals
3	FEU Lady Tamaraws	5	3	2	10	11	8	1.375	426	371	1.148	
4	Arellano Lady Chiefs	5	2	3	6	8	10	0.800	377	391	0.964	
5	Lyceum Lady Pirates	5	1	4	3	5	12	0.417	339	368	0.921	
6	TIP Lady Engineers	5	0	5	0	0	15	0.000	187	375	0.499	

=== Match results ===
- All times are in Philippines Standard Time (UTC+08:00)

Date	Time		Score		Set 1	Set 2	Set 3	Set 4	Set 5	Total	Report
Aug 17	08:00	Benilde Lady Blazers	3–0	FEU Lady Tamaraws	28–26	25–22	25–17			78–65	P–2
Aug 17	10:00	Ateneo Lady Eagles	3–1	Letran Lady Knights	25–16	22–25	25–13	25–20		97–74	P–2
Aug 17	12:00	San Beda Red Lionesses	0–3	Adamson Lady Falcons	18–25	22–25	16–25			56–75	P–2
Aug 18	08:00	UST Golden Tigresses	3–0	Lyceum Lady Pirates	25–18	25–13	25–21			75–52	P–2
Aug 18	10:00	Arellano Lady Chiefs	3–0	TIP Lady Engineers	25–12	25–7	25–13			75–32	P–2
Aug 18	12:00	Perpetual Lady Altas	3–1	San Sebastian Lady Stags	25–14	25–22	22–25	25–17		97–78	P–2
Aug 24	08:00	Lyceum Lady Pirates	1–3	Arellano Lady Chiefs	23–25	25–12	21–25	21–25		90–87	P–2
Aug 24	10:00	San Sebastian Lady Stags	0–3	Ateneo Lady Eagles	17–25	17–25	8–25			42–75	P–2
Aug 24	12:00	Adamson Lady Falcons	3–0	Perpetual Lady Altas	25–20	25–19	25–13			75–52	P–2
Aug 25	08:00	Letran Lady Knights	2–3	San Beda Red Lionesses	25–21	25–21	23–25	8–25	11–15	92–107	P–2
Aug 25	10:00	Benilde Lady Blazers	2–3	UST Golden Tigresses	25–21	22–25	19–25	26–24	12–15	104–110	P–2
Aug 25	12:00	TIP Lady Engineers	0–3	FEU Lady Tamaraws	13–25	22–25	16–25			51–75	P–2
Aug 31	08:00	Benilde Lady Blazers	3–0	Lyceum Lady Pirates	25–19	25–12	25–17			75–48	P–2
Aug 31	10:00	FEU Lady Tamaraws	3–1	Arellano Lady Chiefs	25–13	22–25	25–22	25–10		97–70	P–2
Aug 31	12:00	San Beda Red Lionesses	1–3	Ateneo Lady Eagles	15–25	26–24	5–25	20–25		66–99	P–2
Sep 01	08:00	Perpetual Lady Altas	2–3	Letran Lady Knights	25–16	26–24	24–26	18–25	15–17	108–108	P–2
Sep 01	10:00	TIP Lady Engineers	0–3	UST Golden Tigresses	11–25	9–25	11–25			31–75	P–2
Sep 01	12:00	San Sebastian Lady Stags	0–3	Adamson Lady Falcons	18–25	10–25	14–25			42–75	P–2P–4
Sep 07	08:00	San Beda Red Lionesses	3–0	Perpetual Lady Altas	25–18	25–22	25–17			75–57	P–2
Sep 07	10:00	Letran Lady Knights	1–3	San Sebastian Lady Stags	25–20	22–25	25–27	24–26		96–98	P–2
Sep 07	12:00	Arellano Lady Chiefs	0–3	Benilde Lady Blazers	19–25	15–25	19–25			53–75	P–2
Sep 08	08:00	Adamson Lady Falcons	3–1	Ateneo Lady Eagles	14–25	25–21	25–15	25–21		89–82	P–2
Sep 08	10:00	UST Golden Tigresses	3–2	FEU Lady Tamaraws	25–14	25–17	10–25	23–25	15–12	98–93	P–2
Sep 08	12:00	Lyceum Lady Pirates	3–0	TIP Lady Engineers	25–6	25–15	25–14			75–35	P–2P–4
Sep 14	08:00	San Sebastian Lady Stags	0–3	San Beda Red Lionesses	22–25	16–25	18–25			56–75	P–2
Sep 14	10:00	Adamson Lady Falcons	3–0	Letran Lady Knights	25–13	25–13	25–13			75–39	P–2
Sep 14	12:00	UST Golden Tigresses	3–1	Arellano Lady Chiefs	25–21	25–23	22–25	25–23		97–92	P–2
Sep 15	08:00	FEU Lady Tamaraws	3–1	Lyceum Lady Pirates	21–25	25–14	25–16	25–19		96–74	P–2
Sep 15	10:00	TIP Lady Engineers	0–3	Benilde Lady Blazers	13–25	16–25	9–25			38–75	P–2
Sep 15	12:00	Ateneo Lady Eagles	3–0	Perpetual Lady Altas	25–18	25–10	25–17			75–45	P–2P–4

== Final round ==
- All times are Philippine Standard Time (UTC+8:00).
- All are best-of-three series.

Semifinals
A1	Adamson Lady Falcons	2	3	3
B2	Benilde Lady Blazers	3	2	1
B1	UST Golden Tigresses	1	3	3
A2	Ateneo Lady Eagles	3	1	2

Finals
Adamson Lady Falcons	3	3	–
UST Golden Tigresses	2	0	–
3rd place
Benilde Lady Blazers	2	1	–
Ateneo Lady Eagles	3	3	–

=== Semifinals ===
Rank A1 vs rank B2

Date	Time		Score		Set 1	Set 2	Set 3	Set 4	Set 5	Total	Report
Sep 29	09:00	Adamson Lady Falcons	2–3	Benilde Lady Blazers	24–26	27–29	25–17	25–21	13–15	114–108	P–2
Oct 02	11:00	Benilde Lady Blazers	2–3	Adamson Lady Falcons	12–25	25–21	22–25	25–19	11–15	95–105	P–2
Oct 06	11:00	Adamson Lady Falcons	3–1	Benilde Lady Blazers	25–18	14–25	25–17	25–15		89–75	P–2

Rank B1 vs rank A2

Date	Time		Score		Set 1	Set 2	Set 3	Set 4	Set 5	Total	Report
Sep 29	11:00	UST Golden Tigresses	1–3	Ateneo Lady Eagles	15–25	28–26	16–25	18–25		77–101	P–2
Oct 02	09:00	Ateneo Lady Eagles	1–3	UST Golden Tigresses	26–24	18–25	17–25	17–25		78–99	P–2
Oct 06	09:00	UST Golden Tigresses	3–2	Ateneo Lady Eagles	20–25	25–20	25–16	19–25	16–14	105–100	P–2

=== Finals ===
3rd place

- Ateneo wins series, 2–0

Date	Time		Score		Set 1	Set 2	Set 3	Set 4	Set 5	Total	Report
Oct 09	09:00	Ateneo Lady Eagles	3–2	Benilde Lady Blazers	22–25	25–16	22–25	26–24	15–11	110–101	P–2
Oct 12	09:00	Benilde Lady Blazers	1–3	Ateneo Lady Eagles	20–25	14–25	25–22	19–25		78–97	P–2

Championships

- Adamson wins series, 2–0

Date	Time		Score		Set 1	Set 2	Set 3	Set 4	Set 5	Total	Report
Oct 09	11:00	UST Golden Tigresses	2–3	Adamson Lady Falcons	25–23	17–25	16–25	25–21	11–15	94–109	P–2
Oct 12	11:00	Adamson Lady Falcons	3–0	UST Golden Tigresses	25–19	25–6	25–17			75–42	P–2

== Final standings ==
Rank	Team
1st place, gold medalist(s)	Adamson Lady Falcons
2nd place, silver medalist(s)	UST Golden Tigresses
3rd place, bronze medalist(s)	Ateneo Lady Eagles
4	Benilde Lady Blazers
5	FEU Lady Tamaraws
6	San Beda Red Lionesses
7	Arellano Lady Chiefs
8	Perpetual Lady Altas
9	Letran Lady Knights
10	Lyceum Lady Pirates
11	San Sebastian Lady Stags
12	TIP Lady Engineers

2019 PVL Collegiate champions

1st title

Team Roster
Trisha Mae Genesis, Rizza Cruz, Louie Romero (C), Ceasa Joria Pinar, Shynna Martinez, Antonette Adolfo, Lucille May Almonte, Joanhna Karen Verdeflor (L), Mary Jane Igao, Cae Lazo (L), Hannah Nicole Infante, Martina Lucida Aprecio, Gracelchen Ave, Lorence Grace Toring
Head coach
Lerma Giron

== Awards ==
Award		Player	Team	Ref.
Most Valuable Player	Finals	Louie Romero	Adamson	
Most Valuable Player	Conference	Trisha Genesis	Adamson	
Best Open Spikers	1st: 2nd:	Trisha Genesis; Faith Nisperos	Adamson; Ateneo	
Best Middle Blockers	1st: 2nd:	Lorene Toring; Imee Hernandez	Adamson; UST	
Best Opposite Spiker		Klarissa Abriam	Benilde	
Best Setter		Janel Maraguinot	Ateneo	
Best Libero		Arianne Daguil	Benilde	

== Players of the week ==
Week ending	Player	Team	Ref.
August 18	Faith Nisperos	Ateneo Lady Eagles	
August 25	Imee Hernandez	UST Golden Tigresses	
September 1	Shiela Kiseo	FEU Lady Tamaraws	
September 8	Trisha Genesis	Adamson Lady Falcons	
September 15	Eya Laure	UST Golden Tigresses	

== See also ==
- 2019 Spikers’ Turf Collegiate Conference
