= 2017 Premier Volleyball League Collegiate Conference =

Third conference of the 2017 PVL season

- Duration: September 2 – October 14, 2017
- Teams: 12
- TV partner(s): ABS-CBN Sports and Action

Results
- Champions: NU Lady Bulldogs
- Runners-up: FEU Lady Tamaraws
- Third place: Arellano Lady Chiefs
- Fourth place: Adamson Lady Falcons

Awards
- Conference MVP: Jaja Santiago
- Finals MVP: Jasmine Nabor
- Best OH: Eli Soyud; Regine Anne Arocha
- Best MB: Jeanette Villareal; Risa Sato
- Best OPP: Toni Basas
- Best Setter: Rhea Marist Ramirez
- Best Libero: Gayle Rose Valdez

PVL Collegiate Conference chronology
- < 2016 (SVL) 2018 >

PVL conference chronology
- < 2017 Open 2018 Reinforced >

The women's division of the 2017 Premier Volleyball League Collegiate Conference was the third conference of the Premier Volleyball League and the final conference of the 2017 season. The conference started on September 2, 2017 at the Filoil Flying V Centre, San Juan.

== Participating teams ==
Premier Volleyball League 1st Season Collegiate Conference (Women's Division)
Abbr.	Team	Head coach	Team captain
ADU	Adamson Lady Falcons	(United States) Airess Padda	Jema Galanza
AUN	Arellano Lady Chiefs	(Philippines) Roberto "Obet" Javier	Jovie Prado
ADM	Ateneo Lady Eagles	(Thailand) Tai Bundit	Bea de Leon
CSB	Benilde Lady Blazers	(Philippines) Michael Cariño	Klarissa Abriam
FEU	FEU Lady Tamaraws	(Philippines) George Pascua	Bernadeth Pons
JRU	JRU Lady Bombers	(Philippines) Mia Tioseco	Shola Alvarez
LPU	Lyceum Lady Pirates	(Philippines) Emil Lontoc	Cherilyn Sindayen
NUI	NU Lady Bulldogs	(Philippines) Babes Castillo	Jaja Santiago
SBC	San Beda Red Lionesses	(Philippines) Nemesio Gavino	Rebecca Cuevas
SSC	San Sebastian Lady Stags	(Philippines) Roger Gorayeb	Joyce Santa Rita
TIP	TIP Lady Engineers	(Philippines) Achilles "Boy" Paril	Alexandra Rosales
UPD	UP Lady Maroons	(Philippines) Jerry Yee	Tots Carlos

Group A

Legend
G	Guest Player
S	Setter
MH	Middle Hitter
OH	Outside Hitter
OP	Opposite Hitter
L	Libero
(c)	Team captain
HC	Head coach

Ateneo Lady Eagles
No.	Name	Position
1	RAVENA, Danielle Theris	S
3	WONG, Ma. Deanna Izabella	S
4	SAMONTE, Julianne Marie	OP
5	ABELLA, Bettina Andrea Paz	OP
9	GASTON, Pauline Marie Monique	MH
10	TOLENTINO, Katrina Mae	OH
11	ELEAZAR, Sydney	OH
12	GEQUILLANA, Candice	OH
13	MARAGUINOT, Jhoana Louisse	OH
14	De Leon, Isabel Beatriz (c)	MH
15	GOPICO, Ana Laureen	MH
16	LO, Jennelle Marie	L
17	MADAYAG, Madeleine Yrenea	MH
18	GEQUILLANA, Kassandra Miren	L
	BUNDIT, Anusorn "Tai"	HC

FEU Lady Tamaraws
No.	Name	Position
1	HERNANDEZ, Carlota	OH
2	PONS, Bernadeth (c)	OH
4	GUINO-O, Heather Anne	OH
5	DUREMDES, Ria Beatriz Glenell	L
6	AGUDO, Ivanna Marie	OP
8	CAYUNA, Maria Angelica	S
9	CALINAWAN, Marianne Marie	OH
10	BASAS, Toni Rose	OP
11	ATIENZA, Kyla Llana	L
12	NEGRITO, Kyle Angela	S
13	DOMINGO, Celine Elaiza	OH
14	CARANDANG, Czarina Grace	MH
15	MALABANAN, Jerrili	OH/MH
17	VILLAREAL, Jeanette Virginia	MH
	PASCUA, George	HC

JRU Lady Bombers
No.	Name	Position
1	RIVERA, Mercy Grace	S
2	HUIT, Victoria Kate	L
3	BAUTISTA, Aubry	MB
4	EBUENGA, Christine Kassandra	MB
7	BONDOC, Angela Nicole	OP
8	MACARAYA, Annie	L
10	BATALON, Charry Bea	OH
11	ALVAREZ, Maria Shola May (c)	OH
12	JAVIER, Alecsandra Anne	S
13	SIXTO, Dione	MB
14	VERSOZA, Dolly Grace	OH
15	MONTOJO, Karen Cay	OH
17	SIBANGAN, Annie Paula	OP
18	BODIONGAN, Angelie	OH
	TIOSECO, Mia	HC

Lyceum Lady Pirates
No.	Name	Position
1	MARCELLA, Ysabel	S
2	SINDAYEN, Cherilyn Jhane (c)	OH
4	WANTA, Ciarnelle	OH
5	CARAMAZAN, Cyrielle	L
6	GENOVA, Cherry Rose	S
7	JUANILLO. Bien Elaine	OP
8	FABAY, La Rainne	MB
9	INTON, Patrice Marbelle	OH
10	RAFAEL, Alexandra	MB
11	MIRALLES, Christine	MB
12	SARMIENTO, Pia	L
13	TIZON, Clarisse	OP
14	HONGRIA, Rocelyn	OP
	LONTOC, Emiliano "Emil"	HC

NU Lady Bulldogs
No.	Name	Position
3	SANTIAGO, Alyja Daphne (c)	MH
4	NABOR, Jasmine	S
5	SATO, Risa	MH
6	DOROMAL, Roma Joy	OP
7	ABERIN, Larnie	S
8	CHAVEZ, Joni Anne Kamille	L
9	URDAS, Aiko Sweet	OP
11	DORIA, Roselyn	MB
13	VALDEZ, Gayle Rose	L
14	SINGH, Jorelle	OH
15	PARAN, Audrey Kathryn	OH
	CASTILLO, Raymond "Babes"	HC

San Sebastian Lady Stags
No.	Name	Position
3	BERMILLO, Jewel	L
4	DELOS REYES, Akeyla Renee	OH
5	DELA TORRE, Elka Nicole	OH
6	SANTOS, Daureen	OH
7	TIANGCO, Julene Anne	OH
8	DALISAY, Nikka Mariel	OH
9	GUILLEMA, Vira Mae	S
10	PEREZ, Ritanhelle	OH
13	ORSINI, Soccorsa	OP
14	AMPONIN, Dannah Dionne Muirray	OH
15	ENCARNACION, Dangie	OH
16	EROA, Alysa	L
17	STA. RITA, Joyce (c)	MB
	GORAYEB, Rogelio	HC

Group B

Adamson Lady Falcons
No.	Name	Position
2	ROQUE, May Jeannalyn	OH
3	FLORA, Bernadette	OP
4	PINAR, Ceasa Joria	OP
5	DACORON, Mary Joy	MB
7	TEMPIATURA, Jellie	L
8	GALANZA, Jessica Margarett (c)	OH
9	PERMENTILLA, Chiara May	OH
10	PEREZ, Lea-Ann	MH
11	IGAO, Mary Jane	OH
12	UY, Chrislyn	OH
13	SOYUD, Christine Joy	OP
14	PONCE, Tonnie Rose	L
17	EMNAS, Fenela Risha	S
	PADDA, Airess Star	HC

Arellano Lady Chiefs
No.	Name	Position
2	ESGUERRA, Mary Anne	MB
3	BELLO, Princess	OH
4	BALANOVA, Ma. Meredith	OP
5	RAMIREZ, Rhea Marist	S
6	VERUTIAO, Sarah Princess	S
7	FLORES, Faye Anne Marie	L
8	LIU, Glydel Anne	OH
9	BUEMIA, Cherry Anne	L
12	EBUEN, Necole	OH
13	AROCHA, Regine Anne	OH
14	MARZAN, Andrea	MB
15	DONATO, Carla Amiana	MB
16	TORRES, Eunika Mae	MB
18	PRADO, Jovelyn (c)	OH
	JAVIER, Roberto "Obet"	HC

Benilde Lady Blazers
No.	Name	Position
1	ENGICO, Angela	OP
2	PABLO, Maritess	OP
3	AUSTERO, Rachel	OH
4	VENTURA, Diane	MB
5	UMALI, Chelsie	MB
7	TORRES, Melanie	L
8	CARDIENTE, Pauline	S
9	CUI, Felicia	L
10	SARMIENTO, Claire	MB
11	LIM, Christine	OH
12	DOLORITO, Ellaine	S
15	ABRIAM, Klarissa (c)	OH
16	DAGUIL, Ariane	OH
17	MUSA, Ranya	MB
	CARIÑO, Michael	HC

San Beda Red Lionesses
No.	Name	Position
1	CUEVAS, Rebecca Anjeannete (c)	S
2	TANNAGAN, China	OH
4	AMADOR, Criselle Angeline	MB
5	RACRAQUIN, Daryl Sigrid	L
8	BUNO, Justine Marie	L
9	VIRAY, Maria Nieza	OH
10	ESPIRITU, Satrriani	MB
11	MANUEL, Daisy Marie	S
12	LAGUNA, Nicole Marie	OH
13	PARAS, Trisha Mae	MB
15	GARCIA, Pham	OH
16	VIRAY, Maria Jiezela	OP
17	BALUARTE, Joyce	OP
18	RACRAQUIN, Aurea Francesca	OH
	GAVINO, Nemesio Jr.	HC

TIP Lady Engineers
No.	Name	Position
2	AGUSTIN, Andrea Claire Marie	MH
3	GAMIT, Michelle	OP
4	ACUZAR, Kate Jazlyne	L
5	ROSALES, Alexandra Loiuse (c)	S
6	CAHIGAO, Aixel Myr	S
7	ESPINOSA, Sheena	L
8	ESTOQUE, Wielyn	OH
10	JINON, Ashley Jean	OP
11	LAYUG, Alyssa Gayle	MB
12	GULING, Olivia	L
13	GENTAPA, Jade	OH
14	YAMSON, Eliza Anne	OH
15	CONSENCINO, Khem	MB
16	MABAYAO, Eunice	OH
	ACHILLES, Paril "Boy"	HC

UP Lady Maroons
No.	Name	Position
1	ALINAS, Vina Vera	OH
3	LAYUG, Maristella Gene	MH
6	THAI, Josette	L
9	RAMOS, Jessma Clarice	MH
10	MOLDE, Maria Lina Isabel	OH
11	BUITRE, Marian Alisa	MH
12	SANDOVAL, Caryl	OH
13	DOROG, Justine	OH
14	GANNABAN, Aieshalaine	OP
16	CAILING, Rose Mary	S
17	ESTRAÑERO, Maria Arielle	L
18	CARLOS, Diana Mae (c)	OH
19	ROSIER, Roselyn	OH
20	ESCUTIN, Cynthia Maria	S
	YEE, Jerry	HC

== Format ==
Preliminary round

The twelve teams are split into two groups of six teams each and compete in a single round-robin tournament, with each team playing one match against all group opponents for a total of five matches. The top two teams from each group will advance to the semifinals while the bottom four will be eliminated and ranked 5th through 12th.

Semifinals

The top two teams from each group compete in the semifinals. Teams compete in best-of-three series with the winners advancing to the finals while the losers will compete in the third place series. The match-ups for the semifinals are as follows:

- SF1: Group A #1 vs. Group B #2
- SF2: Group B #1 vs. Group A #2

Third place series

The losing teams from the semifinals compete in a best-of-three series to determine which team will finish third in this conference.

Finals

The winning teams from the semifinals compete in a best-of-three series to determine the conference champions. The losing team in this round will be declared conference runners-up.

== Pool standing procedure ==
Teams are initially ranked by wins followed by match points. A win awards three points if the match lasted for three or four sets (3–0 or 3–1), or two points if the match lasted for five sets (3–2). A loss only awards one point if the match lasted for five sets (2–3).

If multiple teams tie for wins and match points, the next criteria are set ratio (the number of sets won divided by number of sets lost across all matches) and point ratio (the number of points won divided by number of points lost across all matches). If any teams are still tied, the procedure will be applied again, but only considering matches between the remaining tied teams.

== Preliminary round ==
Pos	Team	Pld	W	L	Pts	SW	SL	SR	SPW	SPL	SPR	Qualification
1	NU Lady Bulldogs	5	5	0	15	15	3	5.000	438	355	1.234	Semifinals
2	FEU Lady Tamaraws	5	4	1	12	13	5	2.600	441	373	1.182	Semifinals
3	Ateneo Lady Eagles	5	3	2	9	11	6	1.833	391	327	1.196	
4	San Sebastian Lady Stags	5	2	3	6	7	10	0.700	338	392	0.862	
5	Lyceum Lady Pirates	5	1	4	3	5	13	0.385	379	426	0.890	
6	JRU Lady Bombers	5	0	5	0	1	15	0.067	288	402	0.716	

Rules for classification: 3 points = win match in 3 or 4 sets; 2 points = win match in 5 sets; 1 point = lose match in 5 sets; 0 point = lose match in 3 or 4 sets

Match results

- All times are in Philippines Standard Time (UTC+08:00)

Date	Time		Score		Set 1	Set 2	Set 3	Set 4	Set 5	Total	Report
Sep 02	18:30	Ateneo Lady Eagles	3–0	JRU Lady Bombers	25–17	25–15	25–15	–	–	75–47	P–2
Sep 03	16:00	San Sebastian Lady Stags	0–3	FEU Lady Tamaraws	17–25	21–25	14–25	–	–	52–75	P–2
Sep 04	16:00	NU Lady Bulldogs	3–0	Lyceum Lady Pirates	25–17	25–16	25–21	–	–	75–54	P–2
Sep 06	18:30	JRU Lady Bombers	0–3	San Sebastian Lady Stags	23–25	22–25	21–25	–	–	66–75	P–2
Sep 09	18:30	FEU Lady Tamaraws	3–1	Ateneo Lady Eagles	17–25	25–21	25–19	25–14	–	92–79	P–2
Sep 11	18:30	San Sebastian Lady Stags	1–3	NU Lady Bulldogs	21–25	25–21	11–25	18–25	–	75–96	P–2a
Sep 13	18:30	Lyceum Lady Pirates	3–1	JRU Lady Bombers	25–20	24–26	25–13	25–22	–	99–81	P–2
Sep 16	16:00	Ateneo Lady Eagles	3–0	Lyceum Lady Pirates	25–23	25–20	25–20	–	–	75–63	P–2
Sep 16	18:30	NU Lady Bulldogs	3–1	FEU Lady Tamaraws	22–25	28–26	29–27	25–22	–	104–100	P–2
Sep 23	18:30	San Sebastian Lady Stags	0–3	Ateneo Lady Eagles	11–25	13–25	13–25	–	–	37–75	P–2
Sep 25	16:00	JRU Lady Bombers	0–3	NU Lady Bulldogs	11–25	15–25	13–25	–	–	39–75	P–2a1
Sep 27	16:00	FEU Lady Tamaraws	3–0	JRU Lady Bombers	28–26	25–14	25–15	–	–	78–55	P–2
Sep 27	18:30	Lyceum Lady Pirates	1–3	San Sebastian Lady Stags	15–25	26–24	16–25	23–25	–	80–99	P–2
Sep 30	18:30	NU Lady Bulldogs	3–1	Ateneo Lady Eagles	25–21	13–25	25–19	25–22	–	88–87	P–2a2
Oct 02	16:00	Lyceum Lady Pirates	1–3	FEU Lady Tamaraws	25–18	26–28	15–25	17–25	–	83–96	P–2a3

Pos	Team	Pld	W	L	Pts	SW	SL	SR	SPW	SPL	SPR	Qualification
1	Adamson Lady Falcons	5	5	0	13	15	4	3.750	434	352	1.233	Semifinals
2	Arellano Lady Chiefs	5	4	1	11	12	5	2.400	402	335	1.200	Semifinals
3	UP Lady Maroons	5	3	2	11	13	6	2.167	415	368	1.128	
4	San Beda Red Lionesses	5	2	3	7	8	11	0.727	408	417	0.978	
5	Benilde Lady Blazers	5	1	4	3	4	13	0.308	347	405	0.857	
6	TIP Lady Engineers	5	0	5	0	2	15	0.133	289	418	0.691	

Rules for classification: 3 points = win match in 3 or 4 sets; 2 points = win match in 5 sets; 1 point = lose match in 5 sets; 0 point = lose match in 3 or 4 sets

Match results

- All times are in Philippines Standard Time (UTC+08:00)

Date	Time		Score		Set 1	Set 2	Set 3	Set 4	Set 5	Total	Report
Sep 02	16:00	Arellano Lady Chiefs	3–0	Benilde Lady Blazers	25–20	25–22	25–17	–	–	75–59	P–2
Sep 03	18:30	TIP Lady Engineers	1–3	San Beda Red Lionesses	13–25	18–25	27–25	13–25	–	71–100	P–2
Sep 04	18:30	UP Lady Maroons	2–3	Adamson Lady Falcons	25–17	21–25	25–19	19–25	9–15	99–101	P–2
Sep 06	16:00	Arellano Lady Chiefs	3–0	San Beda Red Lionesses	25–22	25–21	25–18	–	–	75–61	P–2
Sep 09	16:00	Adamson Lady Falcons	3–0	Arellano Lady Chiefs	25–20	25–22	25–16	–	–	75–58	P–2
Sep 11	16:00	UP Lady Maroons	3–0	TIP Lady Engineers	25–20	25–9	25–13	–	–	75–42	P–2b
Sep 13	16:00	Benilde Lady Blazers	1–3	San Beda Red Lionesses	21–25	20–25	25–17	22–25	–	88–92	P–2
Sep 16	13:00	TIP Lady Engineers	0–3	Adamson Lady Falcons	12–25	14–25	13–25	–	–	39–75	P–2
Sep 18	16:00	Benilde Lady Blazers	0–3	UP Lady Maroons	19–25	13–25	19–25	–	–	51–75	P–2
Sep 18	18:30	TIP Lady Engineers	0–3	Arellano Lady Chiefs	16–25	15–25	18–25	–	–	49–75	P–2
Sep 23	16:00	UP Lady Maroons	3–0	San Beda Red Lionesses	25–16	25–19	25–20	–	–	75–55	P–2
Sep 25	18:30	Adamson Lady Falcons	3–0	Benilde Lady Blazers	25–19	25–20	25–17	–	–	75–56	P–2b1
Sep 30	13:00	Arellano Lady Chiefs	3–2	UP Lady Maroons	22–25	25–10	25–19	32–34	15–3	119–91	P–2
Sep 30	16:00	Benilde Lady Blazers	3–1	TIP Lady Engineers	18–25	25–19	25–22	25–22	–	93–88	P–2b2
Oct 02	18:30	San Beda Red Lionesses	2–3	Adamson Lady Falcons	25–22	23–25	16–25	25–21	11–15	100–108	P–2b3

== Final round ==
- All series are best-of-3

Semifinals
1A	NU Lady Bulldogs	3	3
2B	Arellano Lady Chiefs	0	2
1B	Adamson Lady Falcons	3	2	1
2A	FEU Lady Tamaraws	2	3	3

Finals
FEU Lady Tamaraws	1	1
NU Lady Bulldogs	3	3
3rd place
Adamson Lady Falcons	0	1
Arellano Lady Chiefs	3	3

=== Semifinals ===
Rank 1A vs Rank 2B

Date	Time		Score		Set 1	Set 2	Set 3	Set 4	Set 5	Total	Report
Oct 04	16:00	NU Lady Bulldogs	3–0	Arellano Lady Chiefs	25–17	25–16	25–23	–	–	75–56	P–2
Oct 07	18:30	Arellano Lady Chiefs	2–3	NU Lady Bulldogs	17–25	28–26	25–17	13–25	18–20	101–113	P–2

Rank 1B vs Rank 2A

Date	Time		Score		Set 1	Set 2	Set 3	Set 4	Set 5	Total	Report
Oct 04	18:30	Adamson Lady Falcons	3–2	FEU Lady Tamaraws	21–25	25–22	20–25	25–14	15–8	106–94	P–2
Oct 07	16:00	FEU Lady Tamaraws	3–2	Adamson Lady Falcons	21–25	27–25	25–20	23–25	15–11	111–106	P–2
Oct 09	18:30	Adamson Lady Falcons	1–3	FEU Lady Tamaraws	25–21	20–25	22–25	18–25	–	85–96	P–2

=== Finals ===
3rd place

Date	Time		Score		Set 1	Set 2	Set 3	Set 4	Set 5	Total	Report
Oct 11	16:00	Adamson Lady Falcons	0–3	Arellano Lady Chiefs	23–25	24–26	14–25	–	–	61–76	P–2
Oct 14	16:00	Arellano Lady Chiefs	3–1	Adamson Lady Falcons	25–22	25–19	19–25	31–29	–	100–95	P–2

Championship

Date	Time		Score		Set 1	Set 2	Set 3	Set 4	Set 5	Total	Report
Oct 11	18:30	FEU Lady Tamaraws	1–3	NU Lady Bulldogs	22–25	25–21	18–25	24–26	–	89–97	P–2
Oct 14	18:30	NU Lady Bulldogs	3–1	FEU Lady Tamaraws	25–22	25–19	19–25	25–16	–	94–82	P–2

Collegiate Conference Women's Division Champions
National University Lady Bulldogs
Jaja Santiago (c), Jasmine Nabor, Risa Sato, Roma Joy Doromal, Larnie Aberin, Joni Anne Kamille Chavez,
Aiko Sweet Urdas, Roselyn Doria, Gayle Rose Valdez, Jorelle Singh, Audrey Kathryn Paran
Head coach: Raymond "Babes" Castillo

== Awards ==
- Most Valuable Player (Finals)
  - Jasmine Nabor (NU)
- Most Valuable Player (Conference)
  - Jaja Santiago (NU)
- Best Outside Spikers
  - Eli Soyud (Adamson)
  - Regine Anne Arocha (Arellano)
- Best Setter
  - Rhea Marist Ramirez (Arellano)
- Best Opposite Spiker
  - Toni Basas (FEU)
- Best Middle Blockers
  - Jeanette Villareal (FEU)
  - Risa Sato (NU)
- Best Libero
  - Gayle Rose Valdez (NU)

== Final standings ==
Rank	Team
1st place, gold medalist(s)	NU Lady Bulldogs
2nd place, silver medalist(s)	FEU Lady Tamaraws
3rd place, bronze medalist(s)	Arellano Lady Chiefs
4	Adamson Lady Falcons
5	UP Lady Maroons
6	Ateneo Lady Eagles
7	San Beda Red Lionesses
8	San Sebastian Lady Stags
9	Lyceum Lady Pirates
10	Benilde Lady Blazers
11	TIP Lady Engineers
12	JRU Lady Bombers

== PVL on Tour ==
From October 8 to 18, 2017, the league hosted the inaugural Premier Volleyball League on Tour, a series of games played outside of Metro Manila.
