= 2018 Premier Volleyball League Collegiate Conference =

Second conference of the 2018 PVL season

- Duration: July 21 – September 12, 2018
- Teams: 8
- TV partner(s): S+A; Liga

Results
- Champions: UP Lady Fighting Maroons
- Runners-up: FEU Lady Tamaraws
- Third place: Adamson Lady Falcons
- Fourth place: UST Golden Tigresses

Awards
- Conference MVP: Isa Molde
- Finals MVP: Isa Molde
- Best OH: Isa Molde; Bernadette Flora
- Best MB: Celine Domingo; Aieshalaine Gannaban
- Best OPP: Eli Soyud
- Best Setter: Mary Jane Igao
- Best Libero: Thang Ponce

PVL Collegiate Conference chronology
- < 2017 2019 >

PVL conference chronology
- < 2018 Reinforced 2018 Open >

The women's division of the 2018 Premier Volleyball League Collegiate Conference was the fifth conference of the Premier Volleyball League and the second conference of the 2018 season. Conference started on July 21, 2018 and ended on September 12, 2018 at the Filoil Flying V Centre, San Juan, Metro Manila.

== Participating teams ==
2018 Premier Volleyball League Collegiate Conference (Women's Division)
Abbr.	Team	Head coach	Team captain
ADU	Adamson Lady Falcons	(United States) Airess Padda	Lea Ann Perez
CSB	Benilde Lady Blazers	(Philippines) Jerry Yee	Jewel Hannah Lai
FEU	FEU Lady Tamaraws	(Philippines) George Pascua	Kyle Negrito
SBU	San Beda Red Lionesses	(Philippines) Nemesio Gavino	Cesca Racraquin
SSC	San Sebastian Lady Stags	(Philippines) Roger Gorayeb	Joyce Santa Rita
UPH	Perpetual Lady Altas	(Philippines) Michael Cariño	Maria Aurora Blanca Tripoli
UPD	UP Lady Fighting Maroons	(Kenya) Godfrey Okumu	Ayel Estrañero
UST	UST Golden Tigresses	(Philippines) Emilio Reyes Jr.	Christine Francisco

Legend
G	Guest Player
S	Setter
MH	Middle Hitter
OH	Outside Hitter
OP	Opposite Hitter
L	Libero
(c)	Team captain
HC	Head coach

Line-up

Adamson Lady Falcons
No.	Name	Position
1	YANDOC, Nikka	S
2	GENESIS, Trisha	OH
3	FLORA, Bernadette A.	OP
5	DACORON, Mary Joy C.	MB
6	PINAR, Ceasa Joria E.	OP
7	MACASLANG, Krich Aesheluoz	MB
8	ROQUE, Jeannalyn Q.	OP
9	PERMENTILLA, Chiara May	OH
10	PEREZ, Lea-Ann (c)	MB
11	IGAO, Mary Jane	S
12	UY, Chrislyn J.	OH
13	SOYUD, Christine Joy P.	OP
14	PONCE, Tonnie Rose T.	L
15	INFANTE, Hannah	L
	PADDA, Airess Star	HC

Benilde Lady Blazers
No.	Name	Position
1	LAI, Jewel Hannah (c)	S
2	PABLO, Maritess C.	OP
3	GAMIT, Michelle	
4	VENTURA, Diane J.	MB
5	UMALI, Chelsea Anne I.	MB
6	SULIT, Janella M.	L
7	MIRANDA, Kaila Gabrielle	
8	CARDIENTE, Pauline Maurice V.	S
9	CUI, Felicia Marie	OH
10	SARMIENTO, Claire Danielle S.	MB
11	AUSTERO, Rachel Anne R.	OH
15	ABRIAM, Klarissa B.	OH
16	DAGUIL, Jan Arianne	OH
18	TORRES, Melanie G.	L
	YEE, Jerry	HC

FEU Lady Tamaraws
No.	Name	Position
1	HERNENDEZ, Carlota M.	OH
2	EBON, Lycha	OH
4	GUINO-O, Heather Anne L.	OH
5	DUREMDES, Ria Beatriz Glenell J.	L
6	AGUDO, Ivana Marie	OP
7	RONQUILLO, Franz Elize	MB
8	CAYUNA, Maria Angelica P.	S
11	BAUTISTA, Angelica	L
12	NEGRITO, Kyle Angela P. (c)	S
13	DOMINGO, Celine Elaiza B.	MB
14	CARANDANG, Czarina Grace	MB
15	MALABANAN, Jerilli	OP
18	VILLAREAL, Jeanette Virginia P.	MB
19	DEJITO, Clavel	
	PASCUA, George	HC

San Beda Red Lionesses
No.	Name	Position
1	MATIAS, Lynn Robyn	S
2	TANNAGAN, China	OH
3	MANZANO, Kimberly Grace	
5	RACRAQUIN, Daryl Sigrid C.	L
6	MANALAC, Patricia Mae	
8	GALANG, Mikaella Joy	
9	VIRAY, Maria Nieza C.	OH
10	ESPIRITU, Satrriani M.	MB
12	DOMINGO, Maria Aira	
13	PARAS, Trisha Mae S.	MB
16	VIRAY, Maria Jiezela C.	OP
17	DIOSO, Kyla Jeremae	
18	RACRAQUIN, Aurea Francesca C. (c)	OH
22	LAPID, Justine	L
	GAVINO, Nemesio	HC

San Sebastian Lady Stags
No.	Name	Position
1	DAPOL, Mary Rhose	
3	REQUIRME, Shannai Shane	MB
4	SANTIAGO, Karla Jane	
5	AREVALO, Coleen Dorothy	
6	SARMIENTO, Sofia Ashtara	
7	MORALINA, Airll Alexis	
8	MEDENILLA, Zemineth Pearl	
9	SISON, Alexia Vea	S
10	TAN, Kamille Josephine Amaka	
11	ORTIZ, Reizabelle	L
13	CARREON, Jamille Veronica	
16	BERMILLO, Jewelle	L
6	STA. RITA, Joyce (c)	MB
	GORAYEB, Roger	HC

Perpetual Lady Altas
No.	Name	Position
1	TRIPOLI, Maria Aurora Blanca L. (c)	OH
2	IMBO, Cindy B.	OP
4	PERSA, Dana Marie	
5	CASTILLO, Maria Angelou	
6	VERSOZA, Jowie Albert B.	OH
7	DAYAO, Sandra Beatriz	L
8	ROSAL, Jhonna I.	
9	GUAL, Necelle Mae P.	S
10	SANGGALANG, Alyssa G.	L
11	LLORENTE, Hershey Kate A.	
12	UMANDAL, Shyra Mae A.	
14	SUICO, Hannah Marie Paulene	
15	ALDEA, Razel Paula	
17	GAVIOLA, Jenny	
	CARIÑO, Michael	HC

UP Lady Fighting Maroons
No.	Name	Position
1	ATIENZA, Jaila Marie	MB
2	BERNARDO, Lorie Lyn	MB
3	LAYUG, Maristella Gene	MB
4	ALTOMEA, Remelyn	L
5	MAGSARILE, Nicole Ann	OH
8	LAGMAN, Andreanna Pauleen	OH
9	RAMOS, Jessma Clarice	MB
10	MOLDE, Maria Lina Isabel	OH
11	BUITRE, Marian Alisa	OP
14	GANNABAN, Aeshialaine	MB
15	BAUTISTA, Mary Mirgie	OH
17	ESTRAÑERO, Maria Arielle (c)	S
19	ROSIER, Roselyn	OP
20	SOTOMIL, Marianne	S
	OKUMU, Godfrey	HC

UST Golden Tigresses
No.	Name	Position
1	MARTIN, Rizalinda	L
2	TUAZON, Donna Mae	MB
3	JIMENEZ, Isabel Jamie	MB
4	VIRAY, Caitlin	OP
5	SANDOVAL, Carla	OH
6	ALESSANDRINI, Milena	OH
7	BICAR, Alina	S
8	LAURE, Eya	OP
11	VICTORIA, Camille	
12	GALDONES, Kecelyn	MB
13	GALANZA, Maria Fe	S
14	FRANCISCO, Christine (c)	MB
17	DELERIO, Janel	L
18	CAMALIGAN, Jessie Lyn	OP
	REYES, Emilio Jr.	HC

== Format ==
Preliminary round

The eight teams compete in a single round-robin tournament, with each team playing one match against all other teams for a total of seven matches. The top four teams will advance to the semifinals while the bottom four will be eliminated and ranked 5th through 8th in the final standings.

Semifinals

The top four teams from the preliminary round compete in the semifinals. Teams compete in best-of-three series with the winners advancing to the finals while the losers will compete in the third place series. The match-ups for the semifinals are as follows:

- SF1: PR #1 vs. PR #4
- SF2: PR #2 vs. PR #3

Third place series

The losing teams from the semifinals compete in a best-of-three series to determine which team will finish third in this conference. If the series is tied at 1–1 when the championship is decided, the pool standing procedure will be used (starting from set ratio).

Finals

The winning teams from the semifinals compete in a best-of-three series to determine the conference champions. The losing team in this round will be declared conference runners-up.

== Pool standing procedure ==
Teams are initially ranked by wins followed by match points. A win awards three points if the match lasted for three or four sets (3–0 or 3–1), or two points if the match lasted for five sets (3–2). A loss only awards one point if the match lasted for five sets (2–3).

If multiple teams tie for wins and match points, the next criteria are set ratio (the number of sets won divided by number of sets lost across all matches) and point ratio (the number of points won divided by number of points lost across all matches). If any teams are still tied, the procedure will be applied again, but only considering matches between the remaining tied teams.

== Preliminary round ==
Pos	Team	Pld	W	L	Pts	SW	SL	SR	SPW	SPL	SPR	Qualification
1	Adamson Lady Falcons	7	7	0	19	21	8	2.625	667	606	1.101	Semifinals
2	UST Golden Tigresses	7	6	1	17	19	6	3.167	607	508	1.195	Semifinals
3	FEU Lady Tamaraws	7	5	2	14	19	13	1.462	691	653	1.058	Semifinals
4	UP Lady Fighting Maroons	7	4	3	13	16	9	1.778	591	497	1.189	Semifinals
5	Benilde Lady Blazers	7	3	4	10	12	14	0.857	608	571	1.065	
6	San Beda Red Lionesses	7	2	5	7	10	17	0.588	533	601	0.887	
7	Perpetual Lady Altas	7	1	6	4	6	19	0.316	472	575	0.821	
8	San Sebastian Lady Stags	7	0	7	0	4	21	0.190	452	610	0.741	

Rules for classification: Point system: 3 points = win match in 3 or 4 sets; 2 points = win match in 5 sets; 1 point = lose match in 5 sets; 0 point = lose match in 3 or 4 sets

Match results

- All times are in Philippines Standard Time (UTC+08:00)

Date	Time		Score		Set 1	Set 2	Set 3	Set 4	Set 5	Total	Report
Jul 21	14:00	Adamson Lady Falcons	3–0	Perpetual Lady Altas	25–19	25–18	25–16			75–53	P–2
Jul 22	16:00	FEU Lady Tamaraws	3–2	Benilde Lady Blazers	25–19	32–30	15–25	24–26	15–4	111–104	P–2
Jul 22	18:00	UST Golden Tigresses	3–0	San Sebastian Lady Stags	25–21	25–12	25–17			75–50	P–2
Jul 25	14:00	San Beda Red Lionesses	1–3	FEU Lady Tamaraws	16–25	25–21	19–25	22–25		82–96	P–2
Jul 25	16:00	Perpetual Lady Altas	0–3	UST Golden Tigresses	23–25	22–25	16–25			61–75	P–2
Jul 28	14:00	UP Lady Fighting Maroons	3–0	Perpetual Lady Altas	25–10	25–12	25–23			75–45	P–2
Jul 28	16:00	FEU Lady Tamaraws	3–0	San Sebastian Lady Stags	25–15	25–22	25–18			75–55	P–2
Jul 29	14:00	Adamson Lady Falcons	3–1	Benilde Lady Blazers	25–22	22–25	25–22	25–21		97–90	P–2
Jul 29	16:00	San Beda Red Lionesses	0–3	UST Golden Tigresses	18–25	16–25	21–25			55–75	P–2
Aug 02	14:00	Benilde Lady Blazers	3–1	San Beda Red Lionesses	21–25	26–24	25–8	25–23		97–80	P–2
Aug 02	16:00	San Sebastian Lady Stags	1–3	Perpetual Lady Altas	15–25	25–19	25–27	24–26		89–97	P–2
Aug 05	14:00	UST Golden Tigresses	3–1	UP Lady Fighting Maroons	22–25	25–20	25–18	26–24		98–87	P–2
Aug 05	16:00	FEU Lady Tamaraws	2–3	Adamson Lady Falcons	28–30	25–27	25–21	25–19	13–15	116–112	P–2
Aug 08	14:00	UP Lady Fighting Maroons	3–0	San Sebastian Lady Stags	25–15	25–13	25–16			75–44	P–2
Aug 11	14:00	San Sebastian Lady Stags	1–3	San Beda Red Lionesses	14–25	25–21	20–25	16–25		75–96	P–2
Aug 11	18:00	Benilde Lady Blazers	0–3	UST Golden Tigresses	24–26	27–29	17–25			68–80	P–2
Aug 12	14:00	Perpetual Lady Altas	2–3	FEU Lady Tamaraws	15–25	25–15	25–22	14–25	6–15	85–102	P–2
Aug 12	16:00	Adamson Lady Falcons	3–1	UP Lady Fighting Maroons	25–22	19–25	25–23	26–24		95–94	P–2 a
Aug 15	16:00	UP Lady Fighting Maroons	3–0	Benilde Lady Blazers	26–24	27–25	29–27			82–76	P–2
Aug 18	14:00	UST Golden Tigresses	1–3	Adamson Lady Falcons	25–15	24–26	23–25	20–25		92–91	P–2
Aug 18	16:00	FEU Lady Tamaraws	3–2	UP Lady Fighting Maroons	15–25	25–23	15–25	25–23	15–7	95–103	P–2
Aug 19	14:00	San Beda Red Lionesses	2–3	Adamson Lady Falcons	16–25	25–16	25–22	18–25	8–15	92–103	P–2
Aug 19	16:00	San Sebastian Lady Stags	1–3	Benilde Lady Blazers	16–25	25–23	12–25	17–25		70–98	P–2 b
Aug 22	16:00	Perpetual Lady Altas	1–3	San Beda Red Lionesses	19–25	15–25	25–9	21–25		80–84	P–2
Aug 25	16:00	UST Golden Tigresses	3–2	FEU Lady Tamaraws	25–15	25–27	25–18	22–25	15–11	112–96	P–2
Aug 25	16:00	Benilde Lady Blazers	3–0	Perpetual Lady Altas	25–11	25–22	25–18			75–51	P–2
Aug 26	14:00	Adamson Lady Falcons	3–1	San Sebastian Lady Stags	19–25	25–10	25–21	25–13		94–69	P–2
Aug 26	16:00	San Beda Red Lionesses	0–3	UP Lady Fighting Maroons	19–25	16–25	9–25			44–75	P–2 c

== Final round ==
- All series are best-of-three.

Semifinals
1	Adamson Lady Falcons	1	3	1
4	UP Lady Fighting Maroons	3	0	3
2	UST Golden Tigresses	3	1	1
3	FEU Lady Tamaraws	1	3	3

Finals
UP Lady Fighting Maroons	3	3	–
FEU Lady Tamaraws	2	2	–
3rd place
Adamson Lady Falcons	2	3	–
UST Golden Tigresses	3	1	–

=== Semifinals ===
Rank 1 vs Rank 4

Date	Time		Score		Set 1	Set 2	Set 3	Set 4	Set 5	Total	Report
Aug 29	14:00	Adamson Lady Falcons	1–3	UP Lady Fighting Maroons	26–24	19–25	22–25	20–25		87–99	P–2
Sep 01	16:00	UP Lady Fighting Maroons	0–3	Adamson Lady Falcons	23–25	19–25	21–25			63–75	P–2
Sep 02	14:00	Adamson Lady Falcons	1–3	UP Lady Fighting Maroons	19–25	27–29	25–20	20–25		91–99	P–2

Rank 2 vs Rank 3

Date	Time		Score		Set 1	Set 2	Set 3	Set 4	Set 5	Total	Report
Aug 29	16:00	UST Golden Tigresses	3–1	FEU Lady Tamaraws	16–25	26–24	25–18	25–23		92–90	P–2
Sep 01	14:00	FEU Lady Tamaraws	3–1	UST Golden Tigresses	22–25	25–13	25–14	25–20		97–72	P–2
Sep 02	16:00	UST Golden Tigresses	1–3	FEU Lady Tamaraws	25–19	18–25	22–25	17–25		82–94	P–2

=== Finals ===
3rd place

Date	Time		Score		Set 1	Set 2	Set 3	Set 4	Set 5	Total	Report
Sep 09	16:00	Adamson Lady Falcons	2–3	UST Golden Tigresses	20–25	29–27	25–13	19–25	15–17	108–107	P–2
Sep 12	16:00	UST Golden Tigresses	1–3	Adamson Lady Falcons	25–15	20–25	20–25	19–25		84–90	P–2

Championship

Date	Time		Score		Set 1	Set 2	Set 3	Set 4	Set 5	Total	Report
Sep 09	18:00	UP Lady Fighting Maroons	3–2	FEU Lady Tamaraws	14–25	22–25	26–24	25–18	15–5	102–97	P–2
Sep 12	18:00	FEU Lady Tamaraws	2–3	UP Lady Fighting Maroons	20–25	18–25	25–23	25–20	13–15	101–108	P–2

2018 Premier Volleyball League Women's Collegiate champions

1st title

Team Roster
Maria Arielle Estrañero (c), Jaila Marie Atienza, Lorie Lyn Bernardo, Maristella Genn Layug, Remelyn Altomea, Nicole Anne Magsarile, Andreanna Pauleen Lagman, Jessma Clarice Ramos, Maria Lina Isabel Molde, Marian Alisa Buitre, Aieshalaine Gannaban, Mary Mirgie Bautista, Roselyn Rosier, Marianne Sotomil
Head coach
(Kenya) Godfrey Okumu

== Awards ==
Award		Player
Most Valuable Player	Finals: Conference:	Isa Molde (UP)
Best Outside Spikers	1st: 2nd:	Isa Molde (UP); Bernadette Flora (Adamson)
Best Middle Blockers	1st: 2nd:	Celine Domingo (FEU); Aieshalaine Gannaban (UP)
Best Opposite Spiker		Eli Soyud (Adamson)
Best Setter		Mary Jane Igao (Adamson)
Best Libero		Thang Ponce (Adamson)

== Final standings ==
Rank	Team
1st place, gold medalist(s)	UP Lady Fighting Maroons
2nd place, silver medalist(s)	FEU Lady Tamaraws
3rd place, bronze medalist(s)	Adamson Lady Falcons
4	UST Golden Tigresses
5	Benilde Lady Blazers
6	San Beda Red Lionesses
7	Perpetual Lady Altas
8	San Sebastian Lady Stags

== Medalists ==
Champions	Runners-up	Third place
UP Lady Fighting Maroons	FEU Lady Tamaraws	Adamson Lady Falcons
Ayel Estrañero(c); Jaila Marie Atienza; Lorie Lyn Bernardo; Maristella Gene Layug; Remelyn Altomea; Nicole Anne Magsarile; Andreanna Pauleen Lagman; Jessma Clarice Ramos; Isa Molde; Marian Alisa Buitre; Aieshalaine Gannaban; Mary Mirgie Bautista; Roselyn Rosier; Marianne Sotomil Head coach: (Kenya) Godfrey Okumu	Kyle Angela Negrito (c); Carlota Hernandez; Lycha Ebon; Heather Anne Guino-o; Ria Beatriz Glenell Duremdes; Ivana Marie Agudo; Franz Elize Ronquillo; Maria Angelica Cayuna; Angelica Bautista; Celine Elaiza Domingo; Czarina Grace Carandang; Jerrili Malabanan; Jeanette Virginia Villareal; Clavel Dejito Head coach: (Philippines) George Pascua	Lee-Ann Perez (c); Nikka Yandoc; Trisha Genesis; Bernadette Flora; Mary Joy Dacoron; Ceasa Joria Pinar; Krich Aeshelouz Macaslang; Jeannalyn Roque; Chiara May Permentilla; Mary Jane Igao; Chrislyn Uy; Christine Joy Soyud; Tonnie Rose Ponce; Hannah Infante Head coach: (United States) Airess Padda
