= Adamson Lady Falcons volleyball =

Team of Adamson University, Manila, Philippines

Adamson Lady Falcons
- University: Adamson University
- Nickname: Soaring Lady Falcons
- Location: Manila, Philippines
- Head coach: John Philip Yude
- Captain: Shaina Nitura

Main league
- League: UAAP
- Season 86 (2024): 7th

The Adamson Lady Falcons are the women's collegiate varsity volleyball team of the Adamson University. The team competes in the University Athletic Association of the Philippines (UAAP).

== Current roster ==
=== Adamson Lady Falcons volleyball team ===
UAAP Season 88 Roster
No.	Name	Position	Height	Playing Year
1	Shaina Nitura (c)	Outside Hitter	1.79 m (5 ft 10 in)	2nd
2	Jimy Jean Jamili	Outside Hitter	1.65 m (5 ft 5 in)	3rd
3	Laurice Tuddao	Middle Blocker		Rookie
4	Princess Eloisa Dote	Middle Blocker		2nd
8	Kim Yra Rocha	Opposite Hitter		Rookie
9	Ma. Ysabella Francesca Sapienza	Setter	5 ft 5 in (1.65 m)	2nd
10	Kamille Dionisio	Middle Blocker		3rd
13	Frances Ifeoma Mordi (Nigeria)	Outside Hitter		2nd
14	Felicity Sagaysay	Setter		2nd
16	Red Bascon	Outside Hitter		3rd
17	Mary Joy Aseo	Outside Hitter		Rookie
18	Abegail Segui	Opposite Hitter		Rookie
19	Althea Jamine Aposaga	Libero		2nd
20	Frisha Divinagracia	Middle Blocker		Rookie
21	Lana Barerra	Outside Hitter	1.73 m (5 ft 8 in)	Rookie
23	Claire Jesselou Gam	Libero		Rookie

== Previous roster ==
=== SVL/PVL Champions ===
Shakey's V-League 5th Season 1st Conference roster
OH - • Jill Gustillo
OPP - • Michelle Segodine
MB - • Jacqueline So • Nerissa Bautista
S - • Janet Serafica
L - • Lizlee Ann Gata

Shakey's V-League 7th Season 2nd Conference roster
OH - • 3 Bang Pineda • 8 Angela Benting (c) • 11 Nerissa Bautista (G)
OPP - • 5 Luisa Mae Zapanta • 17 Melissa Laborte (G)
MB - • 2 Ma. Paulina Soriano • 10 Angelica Quinlog • 18 Gail Martin •
S - • 12 Ma. Lourdes Patilano • 14 May Jennifer Macatuno
L - • 1 Angelica Vasquez

2019 PVL Collegiate Conference roster
OH - • 2 Trisha Mae Genesis • 9 Lucille May Almonte • 15 Hannah Nicole Infante • 17 Gracelchen Ave
OPP - • 6 Ceasa Joria Pinar • 8 Antonette Adolfo
MB - • 4 Rizza Cruz • 7 Shynna Martinez • 16 Martina Lucida Aprecio • 18 Lorene Grace Toring
S - • 8 Louie Romero (c) • 11 Mary Jane Igao
L - • 10 Joahna Karen Verdeflor • 13 Cae Lazo

== Awards ==
=== Team ===
==== UAAP ====
Adamson Lady Falcons (partial awards)
Year	UAAP Season	Title	Ref
1993	56	3rd Place	
1999	62	3rd Place	
2000	63	3rd Place	
2005	68	Runner-up	
2007	69	3rd Place	
2008	70	Runner-up	
2011	73	3rd Place	
2013	75	3rd Place	
2023	85	3rd Place	

==== SVL/PVL/V-League ====
Adamson Lady Falcons
Year	Conference	Title	Ref
2006	1st	3rd place	
2008	1st	Champions	
2009	1st	3rd place	
2009	2nd	Runner-up	
2010	2nd	Champions	
2011	1st	Runner-up	
2012	Open	Champions	
2014	1st	3rd place	
2018	Collegiate	Runner-up	
2019	Collegiate	Champions	
2022	Collegiate	Runner-up	
2025	Collegiate	Champions	

==== SSL ====
Adamson Lady Falcons
Year	Tournament	Title	Ref
2022	Pre-Season	3rd place	
2023	Invitationals	Runner-up	

=== Individual ===
==== UAAP ====
UAAP awardees (partial lists)

Adamson Lady Falcons (partial)
Year	Award	Player	Ref
2007	Best Receiver	Donaleil Adajar	
2008	Best Setter	Janet Serafica	
2008	Best Server	Sang Laguiles	
2008	Best Digger	Lizlee Ann Gata	
2009	Best Digger	Lizlee Ann Gata	
2010	Best Blocker	Pau Soriano	
2010	Best Receiver; Best Digger	Lizlee Ann Gata	
2013	Best Server	Bang Pineda	

=== Other Collegiate Leagues ===
==== SVL/PVL/V-League ====
SVL/PVL/V-League awardees

Adamson Lady Falcons
Year	Conference	Award	Player	Ref
2008	1st	MVP (Conference)	Nene Bautista (G)	
2008	1st	MVP (Finals)	Sang Laguilles	
2008	1st	Best Setter	Janet Serafica	
2008	1st	Best Server	Angela Benting	
2008	1st	Best Receiver; Best Digger	Lizlee Ann Gata	
2009	1st	Best Digger	Lizlee Ann Gata	
2009	2nd	Best Scorer	Angela Benting	
2009	2nd	Best Blocker	Pau Soriano	
2009	2nd	Best Receiver	Lizlee Ann Gata	
2010	1st	Best Receiver	Lizlee Ann Gata	
2010	2nd	MVP (Finals)	Nerissa Bautista (G)	
2010	2nd	Best Blocker	Pau Soriano	
2010	2nd	Best Receiver	Angela Benting	
2010	2nd	Best Digger	Angelica Vasquez	
2011	1st	Best Attacker	Nene Bautista (G)	
2011	1st	Best Setter	May Macatuno	
2014	1st	Best Attacker	Pau Soriano	
2014	1st	Most Improved Player	Bang Pineda	
2017	Collegiate	1st Best Outside Spiker	Eli Soyud	
2018	Collegiate	2nd Best Outside Spiker	Bern Flora	
2018	Collegiate	Best Opposite Spiker	Eli Soyud	
2018	Collegiate	Best Setter	Mary Jane Igao	
2018	Collegiate	Best Libero	Thang Ponce	
2019	Collegiate	MVP (Conference); 1st Best Outside Spiker	Trisha Mae Genesis	
2019	Collegiate	MVP (Finals)	Louie Romero	
2019	Collegiate	1st Best Middle Blocker	Lorene Toring	
2022	Collegiate	Best Opposite Spiker	Trisha Gayle Tubu	
2022	Collegiate	Best Setter	Louie Romero	

==== Shakey's Super League ====
Shakey's Super League awardees

Adamson Lady Falcons
Year	Conference	Award	Player	Ref
2022	Pre-Season	Best Setter	Louie Romero	
2023	National Invitationals	Best Setter	Angelica Alcantara	
2023	Pre-Season	2nd Best Middle Blocker	Lorene Toring	

== Season-by-season record ==
Records starting UAAP Season 40

Champion	Runner-up	Third place

Adamson Lady Falcons season-by-season record
Year	UAAP Season	Field	Eliminations					Playoffs			Head coach	Ref.
Year	UAAP Season	Field	Finish	GP	W	L	PCT	Round	Opponent	Result	Head coach	Ref.
1977	40										Dulce Pante	
1978	41										Dulce Pante	
1979	42										Dulce Pante	
1980	43										Dulce Pante	
1981	44										Dulce Pante	
1982	45										Dulce Pante	
1983	46										Dulce Pante	
1984	47										Dulce Pante	
1985	48										Dulce Pante	
1986	49										Dulce Pante	
1987	50										Dulce Pante	
1988	51										Dulce Pante	
1989	52										Dulce Pante	
1990	53										Dulce Pante	
1991	54										Dulce Pante	
1992	55										Dulce Pante	
1993	56	8	3rd					Final Four		W	Dulce Pante	
1994	57	Suspended										
1995	58	8	7th					Did not qualify			Dulce Pante	
1996	59	8	7th					Did not qualify			Dulce Pante	
1997	60	8	6th					Did not qualify			Dulce Pante	
1998	61	8	5th					Did not qualify			Dulce Pante	
1999	62	8	3rd					Final Four		W	Dulce Pante	
2000	63	8	3rd					Final Four		W	Dulce Pante	
2001	64	8	8th					Did not qualify			Dulce Pante	
2002	65	8	8th					Did not qualify			Dulce Pante	
2003	66	8	7th					Did not qualify			Dulce Pante	
2004	67	8	5th					Did not qualify			Dulce Pante	
2005	68	8	2nd	14	11	3	3.091	Finals	De La Salle Lady Archers	L	Dulce Pante	
2007	69	7	2nd	12	8	4	3.091	1st seed playoffs Final Four		L	Dulce Pante	
2008	70	8	2nd	14	12	2	0.857	Finals	FEU Lady Tamaraws	L 1–2	Dulce Pante	
2009	71	8	5th	14	9	5	0.643	Did not qualify			Dulce Pante	
2010	72	8	4th	14	9	5	0.643	Final Four	De La Salle Lady Archers	L 0–2	Dulce Pante	
2011	73	8	3rd	14	9	5	1.476	Final Four	UST Lady Tigresses	L 0–2	Dulce Pante	
2012	74	8	5th	14	8	6	1.079	4th seed Playoffs	FEU Lady Tamaraws	L 0–1	Dulce Pante	
2013	75	8	3rd	14	8	6	1.095	Final Four	Ateneo Lady Eagles	L 0–2	Sherwin Meneses	
2014	76	8	5th	14	6	8	1.031	4th seed Playoffs; 1st round playoffs	#4 FEU Lady Tamaraws #3 Ateneo Lady Eagles	W 1–0; L 0–1	Sherwin Meneses	
2015	77	8	5th	14	5	9	0.941	Did not qualify			Sherwin Meneses	
2016	78	8	7th	14	3	11	0.869	Did not qualify			Domingo Custodio	
2017	79	8	8th	14	1	13	0.693	Did not qualify			(United States) Airess Star Padda	
2018	80	8	5th	14	6	8	1.023	Did not qualify			(United States) Airess Star Padda	
2019	81	8	8th	14	2	12	0.845	Did not qualify			Rogelio Getigan	
2020	82	Tournament cancelled									Lerma Giron	
2021	83	Tournament cancelled										
2022	84	8	8th	14	8	6	1.100	Did not qualify			Lerma Giron	
2023	85	8	3rd	14	10	4	1.111	Final Four	NU Lady Bulldogs	L 0–2	Jerry Yee	
2024	86	8	7th	14	3	11	0.860	Did not qualify			John Phillip Yude	
2025	87	8	5th	14	6	8	0.974	Did not qualify			John Phillip Yude	

== Notable players ==
- (Philippines) Angelica Alcantara (S)
- (Philippines) Louie Romero (S)
- (Philippines) Lizlee Ann Gata (L)
- (Philippines) Thang Ponce (L)
- (Philippines) Lorene Toring (MB)
- (Philippines) Pau Soriano (MB)
- (Philippines) Jema Galanza (OH)
- (Philippines) Bang Pineda (OH/L)
- (Philippines) Trisha Genesis (OH)
- (Philippines) Amanda Villanueva (OH/OP)
- (Philippines) Eli Soyud (OH/OP)
- (Philippines) Mylene Paat (OP)
- (Philippines) Trisha Tubu (OP)

Legend
S	Setter
L	Libero
MB	Middle Blocker
OS	Outside Hitter
OP	Opposite Hitter

== See also ==
- Adamson University
- Adamson Soaring Falcons
