= Zam Nolasco =

Filipino volleyball player (born 2000)

Personal information
- Full name: Zamantha Nolasco
- Nickname: Zam
- Nationality: Filipino
- Born: April 30, 2004 (age 22)
- Education: De La Salle College of Saint Benilde
- Height: 1.85 m (6 ft 1 in)

Volleyball information
- Position: Middle Blocker
- Current team: Zus Coffee Thunderbelles

Zamantha Nolasco (born April 30, 2004) is a Filipino volleyball player. She currently playing for the Benilde Lady Blazers in the NCAA.

== Career ==
=== College ===
Nolasco is currently playing for the Lady Blazers of the De La Salle College of Saint Benilde in the National Collegiate Athletic Association (NCAA).

In 2023, she made her debut with the Lady Blazers in the NCAA, where the team earned 4 back-to-back championship titles from 2022 to 2025.

Nolasco bagged her 1st Best Middle Blocker award during the 100th season of the NCAA in 2025.

Despite losing to the Letran Lady Knights in NCAA Season 101, Nolasco earned her first Season MVP title. She is the third Lady Blazer to earn the MVP title in the past five seasons following Mycah Go in Seasons 97 and 100 and Cloanne Mondoñedo in Season 99.

=== Club ===
Nolasco first joined the Farm Fresh Foxies as a guest player in the PVL Invitational Conference in 2023. In 2026, she made her professional debut at the 2026 PVL on Tour for the Zus Coffee Thunderbelles.

=== National team ===
Nolasco was initially invited to the 27-player training pool for Alas Pilipinas under head coach Tai Bundit.

== Clubs ==
- (Philippines) Farm Fresh Foxies (2023)
- (Philippines) Quezon Tangerines (2025)
- (Philippines) Zus Coffee Thunderbelles (2026)

== Awards ==
=== Individual ===
Year	League	Season/Conference	Award	Ref
2022	V-League	Collegiate	1st Best MB	
2023	V-League	Collegiate	1st Best MB	
2023	PNVF	Challenge Cup	1st Best MB	
2024	V-League	Collegiate	1st Best MB	
2025	NCAA	100	1st Best MB	
2025	V-League	Collegiate	1st Best MB	
2025	MPVA		1st Best MB	
2026	NCAA	101	1st Best MB	
2026	NCAA	101	Most Valuable Player	

=== Collegiate ===
==== Benilde Lady Blazers ====
Year	League	Season/Conference	Title	Ref
2022	V-League	Collegiate	3rd place	
2023	NCAA	98	Champions	
2023	V-League	Collegiate	Champions	
2023	PNVF	Challenge Cup	Champions	
2024	NCAA	99	Champions	
2025	NCAA	100	Champions	
2026	NCAA	101	2nd place	

=== Clubs ===
Year	League	Season/Conference	Club	Title	Ref
2025	MPVA		Quezon Tangerines	3rd place	
