= Wielyn Estoque =

Filipino volleyball player (born 2001)

Personal information
- Nickname: Wewe
- Nationality: Filipino
- Born: April 8, 2001 (age 25)
- Education: De La Salle College of Saint Benilde
- Height: 1.69 m (5 ft 7 in)

Volleyball information
- Position: Outside Hitter
- Current club: Zus Coffee Thunderbelles
- Number: 11

Career
- Years: Team
- 2023: Farm Fresh Foxies
- 2025–present: Zus Coffee Thunderbelles

Wielyn Estoque (born April 8, 2001) is a Filipino professional volleyball player. She played for the Benilde Lady Blazers in the NCAA. She is currently playing for the Zus Coffee Thunderbelles in the Premier Volleyball League (PVL).

== Career ==
=== College ===
Estoque played for the Lady Blazers of the De La Salle College of Saint Benilde in the National Collegiate Athletic Association (NCAA).

She played her last playing year with her team in the 100th season of the NCAA, where they bagged their four–peat championship title against Perpetual Lady Altas.

=== Clubs ===
In 2023, she joined the newly built team and major sponsor of her collegiate team, the Farm Fresh Foxies.

After playing her last year in the 100th season of NCAA in 2025, she was signed by the Zus Coffee Thunderbelles.

== Awards ==
=== Individual ===
Year	League	Season/Conference	Award	Ref
2023	PNVF	Challenge Cup	Season's MVP	
2023	PNVF	Challenge Cup	1st Best OH	
2024	SSL	Invitationals	1st Best OH	
2024	V-League	Collegiate	1st Best OH	

=== Collegiate ===
==== Benilde Lady Blazers ====
Year	League	Season/Conference	Title	Ref
2022	NCAA	97	Champions	
2022	V-League	Collegiate	3rd place	
2023	NCAA	98	Champions	
2023	V-League	Collegiate	Champions	
2023	PNVF	Challenge Cup	Champions	
2024	NCAA	99	Champions	
2024	SSL	Invitationals	3rd place	
2025	NCAA	100	Champions	

=== Clubs ===
Year	League	Season/Conference	Club	Title	Ref
2025	PVL	Reinforced	Zus Coffee Thunderbelles	Runner-up	
