= Gayle Pascual =

Filipino volleyball player

Personal information
- Full name: Jhasmin Gayle Pascual
- Nationality: Filipino
- Born: September 3, 1999 (age 27)
- Height: 1.72 m (5 ft 8 in)
- Education: De La Salle–College of Saint Benilde

Volleyball information
- Position: Outside Hitter/ Opposite Hitter
- Current club: Galeries Tower Highrisers

Career
Years	Teams
2023	Farm Fresh Foxies
2024–2025	Zus Coffee Thunderbelles
2026–present	Galeries Tower Highrisers

Jhasmin Gayle Pascual (born August 3, 1999) is a Filipino professional volleyball player who currently plays for the Galeries Tower Highrisers of the Premier Volleyball League (PVL). She played for the Benilde Lady Blazers in the NCAA.

== Career ==
=== Collegiate ===
Pascual played for the Lady Blazers of De La Salle College of Saint Benilde in the NCAA.

She made her first game appearance with the Lady Blazers in the NCAA Season 95, where the tournament was later cancelled due to the COVID-19 pandemic.

Two years after the tournament was cancelled, it came back and opened a new season. The NCAA Season 97 give the Lady Blazers their second championship following their first championship in NCAA Season 90. Pascual also bagged the Finals MVP award.

In the NCAA Season 98, they bagged the third championship title and back to back championship title following their last championship in NCAA Season 97. Pascual was also awarded Best Opposite Hitter.

== Awards ==
=== Individual ===
Year	League	Season/Conference	Award	Ref
2022	NCAA	97	Most Valuable Player (Finals)	
2023	NCAA	98	Best Opposite Hitter	
2023	V-League	Collegiate	Most Valuable Player (Finals)	
2023	V-League	Collegiate	Best Opposite Hitter	
2024	PNVF	Champions League	Best Opposite Hitter	
2024	NCAA	99	Most Valuable Player (Finals)	

=== Collegiate ===
==== Benilde Lady Blazers ====
Year	League	Season/Conference	Title	Ref
2022	NCAA	97	Champions	
2022	V-League	Collegiate	3rd place	
2023	NCAA	98	Champions	
2023	V-League	Collegiate	Champions	
2023	PNVF	Challenge Cup	Champions	
2024	NCAA	99	Champions	

=== Clubs ===
Year	League	Season/Conference	Club	Title	Ref
2025	PVL	Reinforced	Zus Coffee Thunderbelles	Runner-up	

=== Other recognitions ===
Year	Award giving body	Award	Ref
2023	Collegiate Press Corps	NCAA Collegiate Player of the Year	
