= Benilde Lady Blazers volleyball =

Philippine volleyball team

Benilde Lady Blazers
- University: De La Salle–College of Saint Benilde
- Nickname: Lady Blazers
- Location: Manila, Philippines
- Head coach: Jerry Yee
- Captain: Cloanne Sophia Mondoñedo

Main league
- League: NCAA
- Season 100 (2025): (gold) Champions

Championships
- NCAA: 5 VLPH: 1

The College of Saint Benilde Lady Blazers are the volleyball team of De La Salle–College of Saint Benilde.

== History ==
The CSB Lady Blazers first joined NCAA women's volleyball tournament in 1998. They claimed their first NCAA women's volleyball championship in the NCAA Season 91 beating the thrice-to-beat San Sebastian Lady Stags in 4th sets on the do-or-die Game 4 of the NCAA Season 91 finals series.

In 2022, CSB Lady Blazers bags the NCAA Season 97 women's volleyball tournament championship with no loss.

Aside from NCAA, CSB Lady Blazers also play in the Shakey's Super League and V-League.

== Current roster ==
=== CSB Lady Blazers volleyball team ===
NCAA Season 98 roster
Number	Player	Position	Height	Birth date	High School
1	Chenae Basarte	Setter	5 ft 5 in (1.65 m)	December 9, 2001 (age 24)	Hope Christian High School
3	Michelle Gamit	Middle Blocker			
4	Kim Alison Estenzo	Libero			Hope Christian High School
5	Fiona Naomi Getigan	Libero			
6	Angelika Mondejar	Opposite Hitter			Hope Christian High School
7	Jade Gentapa	Outside Hitter			
8	Cloanne Sophia Mondoñedo	Setter		November 16, 2000 (age 25)	Hope Christian High School
9	Jhasmin Gayle Pascual	Opposite Hitter		September 3, 1999 (age 26)	UST High School
10	Mycah Go		April 15, 2001 (age 23)		
11	Maria Camill Avila	Middle Blocker			
12	Corrine Alysson Apostol	Outside Hitter			Hope Christian High School
14	Wielyn Estoque	Outside Hitter			
17	Jessa Dorog	Outside Hitter		August 17, 2003 (age 22)	Hope Christian High School
18	Cristy Ondangan	Middle Blocker			Hope Christian High School
21	Zamantha Nolasco	Middle Blocker			

== Previous roster ==
=== NCAA Champions ===
NCAA Season 91 roster

Benilde Lady Blazers
No.	Player	Position
	Janine Navarro	OH
	Christine Danielle Kim	OH
	Rachel Austero	OH
	Chelsea Chloe Santillan	OH
	Jane Frances Borrero	OP
	Bianca Gabrielle Lizares	OP
	Chelsea Anne Umali	MB
	Ranya Musa	MB
	Jeanette Panaga	MB
	Diane Ventura	MB
	Djanel Cheng (c)	S
	Elaine Monica Dolorito	S
	Arianne Daguil	L
	Melanie Torres	L

NCAA Season 97 roster

Benilde Lady Blazers
No.	Player	Position
1	Chenae Basarte	S
2	Cathrina Dizon	MB
3	Michelle Gamit	MB
4	Kim Estenzo	L
5	Queen Ann Salmon	OP
6	Angelika Mondejar	L
7	Jade Gentapa	OH
8	Cloanne Mondoñedo	S
9	Gayle Pascual	OP
10	Mycah Go (c)	OH
11	Ma. Camill Avila	MB
12	Corrine Apostol	OH
14	Wielyn Estoque	OH
18	Cristy Ondangan	MB
	Jerry Yee	HC

NCAA Season 98 roster

Benilde Lady Blazers
No.	Player	Position
1	Chenae Basarte	S
3	Michelle Gamit	MB
4	Kim Estenzo	L
5	Fiona Mae Getigan	L
6	Angelika Mondejar	OP
7	Jade Gentapa	OH
8	Cloanne Mondoñedo (c)	S
9	Gayle Pascual	OP
11	Ma. Camill Avila	MB
12	Corrine Apostol	OH
14	Wielyn Estoque	OH
17	Jessa Dorog	OH
18	Cristy Ondangan	MB
21	Zam Nolasco	MB
	Jerry Yee	HC

NCAA Season 99 roster

Benilde Lady Blazers
No.	Player	Position
1	Chenae Basarte	S
3	Michelle Gamit	MB
4	Kim Estenzo	L
5	Fiona Mae Getigan	L
7	Jade Gentapa	OH
8	Cloanne Mondoñedo	S
9	Gayle Pascual	OP
10	Mycah Go	OH
11	Sophia Margarette Badion	MB
12	Corrine Apostol	OH
14	Wielyn Estoque	OH
15	Fiona Marie Inocentes	MB
16	Clydel Mae Catarig	OP
17	Jessa Dorog (c)	OH
18	Cristy Ondangan	MB
21	Zam Nolasco	MB
	Jerry Yee	HC

NCAA Season 100 roster

Benilde Lady Blazers
No.	Player	Position
1	Chenae Basarte	S
2	Shekainna Redge Lleses	OH
3	Shahanna Rheign Lleses	OH
4	Kim Estenzo	L
5	Fiona Mae Getigan	L
6	Zen Reina Basilio	MB
9	Rhea Mae Densing	OP
10	Mycah Go (c)	OH
11	Sophia Margarette Badion	MB
12	Corrine Apostol	OH
14	Wielyn Estoque	OH
16	Clydel Mae Catarig	OP
17	Jessa Dorog	OH
18	Cristy Ondangan	MB
19	Mary Grace Borromeo	OH
21	Zam Nolasco	MB
	Rogelio Getigan	HC

=== V-League PH Champions ===
2023 line-up

Benilde Lady Blazers
No.	Player	Position
1	Chenae Basarte	S
2	Cathrina Dizon	MB
3	Michelle Gamit	MB
4	Kim Estenzo	L
5	Fiona Mae Getigan	L
6	Zen Reina Basilio	S
7	Jade Gentapa	OH
8	Cloanne Mondoñedo (c)	S
9	Gayle Pascual	OP
11	Sophia Margarette Badion	MB
12	Corrine Apostol	OH
14	Wielyn Estoque	OH
16	Clydel Mae Catarig	OP
17	Jessa Dorog	OH
18	Cristy Ondangan	MB
19	Mary Grace Borromeo	OH
20	Rhea Mae Densing	OH
21	Zam Nolasco	MB
	Jerry Yee	HC

== Awards ==
=== Team ===
==== SVL/PVL/V-League ====
CSB Lady Blazers
Year	Season	Placement	Ref
2008	1st	8th place	
2008	2nd	8th place	
2009	1st	8th place	
2009	2nd	6th place	
2010	1st	8th place	
2010	2nd	8th place	
2011	1st	10th place	
2012	1st	did not compete	
2013	1st	did not compete	
2014	1st	8th place	
2015	Collegiate	7th place	
2016	Collegiate	10th place	
2017	Collegiate	10th place	
2018	Collegiate	5th place	
2019	Collegiate	4th place	
2022	Collegiate	3rd place	
2023	Collegiate	Champions	
2024	Collegiate	4th place	

==== SSL ====
CSB Lady Blazers
Year	Season	Placement	Ref
2022	Pre-Season	11th place	
2023	Invitationals	5th place	
2023	Pre-Season	5th place	
2024	Invitationals	3rd place	
2024	Pre-Season	6th place	
2025	Invitationals	Runner-up	
2025	Pre-Season	7th place	
2026	Invitationals	Runner-up	
2026	Pre-Season		

==== PNVF ====
CSB Lady Blazers
Year	Season	Placement	Ref
2023	Challenge Cup	Champions	
2024	Champions League	4th place	

=== Individual ===
==== NCAA ====
NCAA individual awardees

CSB Lady Blazers individual awards
Year	Season	Award	Player	Ref
2010	85	Best Scorer	Giza Yumang	
2010	85	Best Attacker	Giza Yumang	
2013	88	Best Setter	Djanel Cheng	
2014	89	Best Setter	Djanel Cheng	
2014	89	Best Receiver	Rica Jane Enclona	
2015	90	Best Attacker	Jeanette Panaga	
2015	90	Best Blocker	Jeanette Panaga	
2016	91	Best Blocker	Jeanette Panaga	
2016	91	Most Valuable Player (Finals)	Jeanette Panaga	
2016	91	Best Receiver	Melanie Torres	
2019	94	1st Best Middle Blocker	Rachel Anne Austero	
2022	97	1st Best Outside Hitter	Francis Mycah Go	
2022	97	Most Valuable Player (Conference)	Francis Mycah Go	
2022	97	Most Valuable Player (Finals)	Gayle Pascual	
2023	98	2nd Best Outside Hitter	Jade Gentapa	
2023	98	Most Valuable Player (Finals)	Jade Gentapa	
2023	98	Best Opposite Hitter	Gayle Pascual	

==== SVL/PVL/V-League PH ====
PVL/V-League individual awardees

CSB Lady Blazers individual awards
Year	Season	Award	Player	Ref
2009	2nd	Best Attacker	Giza Yumang	
2019	Collegiate	Best OP	Klarissa Abriam	
2019	Collegiate	Best Libero	Arianne Daguil	
2022	Collegiate	1st Best MB	Zamantha Nolasco	
2022	Collegiate	2nd Best MB	Michelle Gamit	
2023	Collegiate	Best OP	Gayle Pascual	
2023	Collegiate	MVP (Finals)	Gayle Pascual	
2023	Collegiate	1st Best OH	Jade Gentapa	
2023	Collegiate	1st Best MB	Zamantha Nolasco	
2024	Collegiate	1st Best OH	Wielyn Estoque	
2024	Collegiate	1st Best MB	Zamantha Nolasco	

==== PNVF ====
PNVF individual awardees

CSB Lady Blazers individual awards
Year	Season	Award	Player	Ref
2023	Challenge Cup	Most Valuable Player	Wielyn Estoque	
2023	Challenge Cup	1st Best Outside Spiker	Wielyn Estoque	
2023	Challenge Cup	Best Setter	Chenae Basarte	
2023	Challenge Cup	1st Best Middle Blocker	Zamantha Nolasco	
2023	Challenge Cup	Best Libero	Fiona Mae Getigan	
2024	Champions League	Best Opposite Spiker	Gayle Pascual	

== Season-by-season records ==
=== NCAA ===
Starting NCAA Season 83
Year	Season												
Year	Season	Elimination				Stepladder #1		Stepladder #2/Semis		Finals		Ranking	Ref.
Year	Season	GP	W	L	Pts	Opp.	Result	Opp.	Result	Opp.	Result	Ranking	Ref.
2008	83									Lady Stags	L	Runner-up	
2009	84									Lady Stags	L	Runner-up	
2010	85									Lady Stags	L	Runner-up	
2011	86	Suspended											
2012	87					did not qualify						8th place	
2013	88					did not qualify						5th place	
2014	89									Lady Altas	L	3rd place	
2015	90									Lady Chiefs	L	4th place	
2016	91	9	6	3	19					Lady Stags	W 3–2	Champions	
2017	92	9	6	3	18					Lady Chiefs	L 0–1	3rd place	
2018	93	9	5	4	13	did not qualify						6th place	
2019	94	9	8	1	25					Lady Altas	L 2–3	3rd place	
2020	95	cancelled											
2021	96	cancelled											
2022	97	9	9	0	27					Lady Chiefs	W 2–0	Champions	
2023	98	9	9	0	25					Lady Pirates	W 2–0	Champions	
2024	99	9	9	0	26					Lady Knights	W 2–0	Champions	
2025	100	18	16	2	47					Lady Knights	W 2–0	Champions	

=== Other tournaments ===
==== Shakey's V-League ====
Records starting 2008 V-League season

Champion	Runner-up	Third place

Year	Season	Preliminary round				Quarterfinals		Semifinals		Finals		Ranking	Ref.
Year	Season	GP	W	L	Pts	Opp.	Result	Opp.	Result	Opp.	Result	Ranking	Ref.

== Notable players ==
- Cloanne Mondoñedo (S)
- Djanel Cheng (S)
- Jeanette Panaga (MB)
- Zam Nolasco (MB)
- Michelle Gamit (MB)
- Jade Gentapa (OH)
- Mycah Go (OH)
- Tricia Santos (OH)
- Wielyn Estoque (OH)
- Gayle Pascual OP)

Legend
S	Setter
L	Libero
MB	Middle Blocker
OS	Outside Hitter
OP	Opposite Hitter

== See also ==
- De La Salle College of Saint Benilde
- Benilde Blazers
