= Michelle Gamit =

Filipino volleyball player (born 2000)

Mich Gamit

Personal information
- Full name: Michelle Gamit
- Nationality: Filipino
- Born: May 9, 2000 (age 26)
- Height: 1.73 m (5 ft 8 in)
- Education: De La Salle College of Saint Benilde

Volleyball information
- Position: Middle Blocker
- Current club: Creamline Cool Smashers
- Number: 3

Career
Years	Teams
2023–2024	Farm Fresh Foxies
2024–2025	Zus Coffee Thunderbelles
2025–present	Creamline Cool Smashers

Michelle Gamit (born May 9, 2000) is a Filipino volleyball player who is a middle blocker for the Creamline Cool Smashers of the Premier Volleyball League (PVL). She played for the Benilde Lady Blazers in the NCAA.

== Career ==
=== College ===
Gamit played for the Lady Blazers of the De La Salle College of Saint Benilde in the National Collegiate Athletic Association (NCAA).

She played her last playing year with her team in the 99th season of the NCAA, where they bagged their 3–peat championship title against Letran Lady Knights.

=== Clubs ===
In 2023, she along with some of her some teammates from Lady Blazers, was given a permission by the Games and Amusement Board to join and play for the Farm Fresh Foxies without forgoing their remaining year to play in the collegiate volleyball.

After playing her last year in the 99th season of NCAA in 2024, she was signed by the Zus Coffee Thunderbelles.

In 2025, she joined Creamline Cool Smashers.

== Awards ==
=== Individual ===
Year	League	Season/Conference	Award	Ref
2022	V-League	Collegiate	2nd Best MB	

=== Collegiate ===
==== Benilde Lady Blazers ====
Year	League	Season/Conference	Title	Ref
2022	NCAA	97	Champions	
2022	V-League	Collegiate	3rd place	
2023	NCAA	98	Champions	
2023	V-League	Collegiate	Champions	
2023	PNVF	Challenge Cup	Champions	
2024	NCAA	99	Champions	

=== Clubs ===
Year	League	Conference	Club	Title	Ref
2025	PVL	on Tour	Creamline Cool Smashers	Bronze	
2025	PVL	Invitational	Creamline Cool Smashers	Bronze	
2026	PVL	All-Filipino	Creamline Cool Smashers	Champions	
