= Cloanne Mondoñedo =

Filipino volleyball player (born 2000)

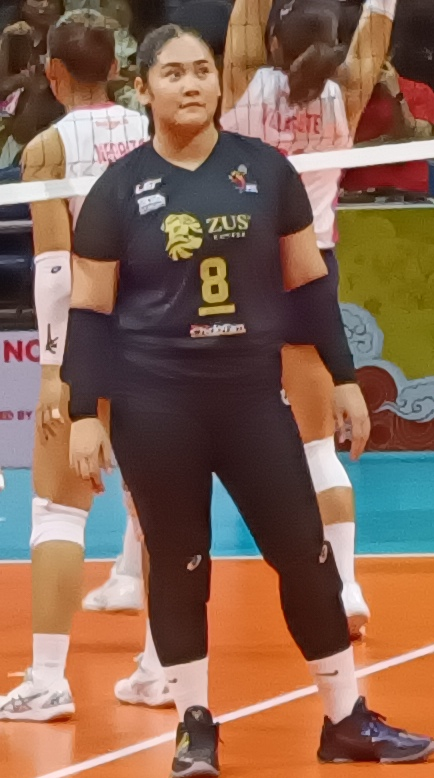
- Mondoñedo in 2025

Personal information
- Full name: Cloanne Sophia Mondoñedo
- Nationality: Filipino
- Born: November 16, 2000 (age 25)
- Hometown: Gloria, Oriental Mindoro, Philippines
- Height: 1.67 m (5 ft 6 in)
- Education: De La Salle College of Saint Benilde

Volleyball information
- Position: Setter
- Current club: Zus Coffee Thunderbelles
- Number: 8

Cloanne Sophia Mondoñedo (born November 16, 2000) is a Filipino volleyball player who is a setter and serves as team captain for the Zus Coffee Thunderbelles of the Premier Volleyball League. She played for the Benilde Lady Blazers in the NCAA.

== Career ==
=== College ===
Mondoñedo played for the Lady Blazers of the De La Salle College of Saint Benilde in the National Collegiate Athletic Association (NCAA).

She ended her stint with Lady Blazers in Season 99, where they get their 3-peat championship since 2022.

=== Clubs ===
In 2023, she joined the debuting Farm Fresh Foxies on its campaign in the PVL.

In 2024, she transferred to Zus Coffee Thunderbelles, the sister team of her former team, together with her Head coach Jerry Yee and some of her teammates on her previous squad.

== Clubs ==
- (Philippines) Farm Fresh Foxies (2023)
- (Philippines) Zus Coffee Thunderbelles (2024–present)

== Awards ==
=== Individual ===
Year	League	Season/Conference	Award	Ref
2024	NCAA	99	Season's MVP	
2024	NCAA	99	Best Setter	
2025	PVL	Reinforced	Best Setter	

=== Collegiate ===
==== Benilde Lady Blazers ====
Year	League	Season/Conference	Title	Ref
2022	NCAA	97	Champions	
2022	V-League	Collegiate	3rd place	
2023	NCAA	98	Champions	
2023	V-League	Collegiate	Champions	
2023	PNVF	Challenge Cup	Champions	
2024	NCAA	99	Champions	

=== Clubs ===
Year	League	Conference	Club	Title	Ref
2025	PVL	Reinforced	Zus Coffee Thunderbelles	Runner-up	

=== Special recognitions ===
Year	Award Giving Body	Award	Ref
2024	Collegiate Press Corps	MVP of the volleyball tournament	
