= 2025 Shakey's Super League National Invitationals =

2025 collegiate volleyball competition

Tournament details
- Dates: August 1–3, 2025; August 22–24, 2025; August 29–31, 2025
- Teams: 12
- Venues: 3

Tournament statistics
- Matches played: 18

The 2025 Shakey's Super League National Invitationals was the third edition of the national collegiate competition organized by the Shakey's Super League and the second SSL tournament of 2025. In celebration of Shakey's 50th anniversary, this year 2025 edition tournament will be in a three-leg nationwide tour. The SSL came up with a tour-style format to showcase the talents of provincial squads in front of their home crowd.

The NU Lady Bulldogs entered this tournament as the defending National Invitationals champions.

== Venues ==
Preliminary round	Preliminary round	Preliminary round
Davao City	Mandaue	Batangas City
University of Southeastern Philippines Gym	Mandaue City Sports Complex	Millennium Gym, SH Campus
Capacity: 8,000	Capacity: 4,000	Capacity: 4,496

== Format ==
Preliminary round

1. Single-round robin format; Teams are ranked using the FIVB Ranking System.
2. The team with the best win-loss record will be declared champions.

== Pool standing procedure ==
- First, teams are ranked by the number of matches won.
- If the number of matches won is tied, the tied teams are then ranked by match points, wherein:
  - Match won 3–0 or 3–1: 3 match points for the winner, 0 match points for the loser.
  - Match won 3–2: 2 match points for the winner, 1 match point for the loser.
- In case of any further ties, the following criteria shall be used:
  - Set ratio: the number of sets won divided by number of sets lost.
  - Point ratio: number of points scored divided by number of points allowed.
  - Head-to-head standings: any remaining tied teams are ranked based on the results of head-to-head matches involving the teams in question.

== Mindanao Leg ==
=== Teams ===
Team	School	Association
Davao Selection	AdDU, HCDC, UM	—N/a
NDDU Lady Kingfishers	Notre Dame of Dadiangas University	—N/a
NU Lady Bulldogs	National University	UAAP
UP Fighting Maroons	University of the Philippines	UAAP

=== Preliminary round ===
- All times are Philippine Standard Time (UTC+8:00).
- The top team with the best win-loss record will be declared champions.

Pos	Team	Pld	W	L	Pts	SW	SL	SR	SPW	SPL	SPR	Qualification
1	NU Lady Bulldogs	3	3	0	9	9	1	9.000	245	169	1.450	Champions
2	UP Fighting Maroons	3	2	1	6	7	3	2.333	235	187	1.257	
3	NDDU Lady Kingfishers	3	1	2	3	3	6	0.500	179	214	0.836	
4	Davao Selection	3	0	3	0	0	9	0.000	136	225	0.604	

Date	Time	Venue		Score		Set 1	Set 2	Set 3	Set 4	Set 5	Total	Report
August 1	17:00	USeP Gym	NU Lady Bulldogs	3–0	NDDU Lady Kingfishers	25–19	25–13	25–19			75–51	
August 1	19:00	USeP Gym	UP Fighting Maroons	3–0	Davao Selection	25–11	25–13	25–15			75–39	
August 2	15:30	USeP Gym	UP Fighting Maroons	3–0	NDDU Lady Kingfishers	25–16	27–25	25–12			77–53	
August 2	18:00	USeP Gym	NU Lady Bulldogs	3–0	Davao Selection	25–9	25–12	25–14			75–35	
August 3	15:30	USeP Gym	Davao Selection	0–3	NDDU Lady Kingfishers	19–25	23–25	20–25			62–75	
August 3	18:00	USeP Gym	UP Fighting Maroons	1–3	NU Lady Bulldogs	21–25	25–20	20–25	17–25		83–95	

=== Final standings ===
Rank	Team
1st place, gold medalist(s)	NU Lady Bulldogs
2nd place, silver medalist(s)	UP Fighting Maroons
3rd place, bronze medalist(s)	NDDU Lady Kingfishers
4	Davao Selection

2025 SSL National Invitationals Mindanao Leg champions
NU Lady Bulldogs
2nd title

Team Roster
Evangeline Alinsug (c), Camilla Lamina, Arah Ella Panique, Myrtle Escanlar, Celine Marsh, Nathasza Kaye Bombita, Josline Salazar, Abegail Pono, Chaitlin Mauricio, Aishat Bello, Minierva Maaya, Alexa Mata, Shaira Mae Jardio, IC Cepada, Harlyn Serneche, Samantha Cantada, Denesse Daylisan, Rashel Bajamonde, Lyzel Dela Peña, Jenelyn Jacob
Head coach
Sherwin Meneses

=== Individual award ===
Award	Player	Team	Ref.
Best Player of Mindanao Leg	Samantha Cantada	NU	

=== Medalists ===
Gold	Silver	Bronze
NU Lady Bulldogs: Evangeline Alinsug (c); Arah Ella Panique; Myrtle Escanlar; Celine Marsh; Nataszha Kaye Bombita; Josline Salazar; Abegail Pono; Camilla Lamina; Chaitlyn Mauricio; Aishat Bello; Minierva Maaya; Alexa Mata; Shaira Mae Jardio; IC Cepada; Harlyn Serneche; Samantha Cantada; Denesse Daylisan; Rashel Bajamonde; Lyzel Dela Peña; Jenelyn Jacob Head coach: Sherwin Meneses	UP Fighting Maroons: Joan Monares (c); Yesha Noceja; Casiey Dongallo; Irah Jaboneta; Kizzie Madriaga; Julia De Leon; Jelai Gajero; Kianne Olango; Jean Sasondoncillo; Gracen Fernandez; Bienne Bansil; Niña Ytang; Cassandra Gamboa; Shianly Zerna Head coach: Fabio Menta	NDDU Lady Kingfishers: Sophia Kyla Aguas (c); Excel Kaye Lopez; Excel Kate Lopez; Michaella Peneza; Rhose Capili; Stifanny Villarosa; Princess Villacorta; Giselle Velasco; Mariel Francisco; Ruzzel Barong; Jea Peñaranda; Karylle Baclaan; Kate Inot; Angelica Depita Head coach: Alvin Francis Ambe

== Visayas Leg ==
=== Teams ===
Team	School	Association
Adamson Lady Falcons	Adamson University	UAAP
Ateneo Blue Eagles	Ateneo de Manila University	UAAP
USC Lady Warriors	University of San Carlos	CESAFI
USPF Lady Panthers	University of Southern Philippines Foundation	CESAFI

=== Preliminary round ===
- All times are Philippine Standard Time (UTC+8:00).
- The top team with the best win-loss record will be declared champions.

Pos	Team	Pld	W	L	Pts	SW	SL	SR	SPW	SPL	SPR	Qualification
1	Adamson Lady Falcons	3	3	0	9	9	1	9.000	257	173	1.486	Champions
2	USC Lady Warriors	3	2	1	5	7	6	1.167	283	290	0.976	
3	Ateneo Blue Eagles	3	1	2	4	5	7	0.714	261	269	0.970	
4	USPF Lady Panthers	3	0	3	0	2	9	0.222	206	275	0.749	

Date	Time	Venue		Score		Set 1	Set 2	Set 3	Set 4	Set 5	Total	Report
August 22	17:00	MCSC	USPF Lady Panthers	1–3	Ateneo Blue Eagles	27–29	19–25	26–24	14–25		86–103	
August 22	19:00	MCSC	USC Lady Warriors	1–3	Adamson Lady Falcons	16–25	33–31	18–25	12–25		79–106	
August 23	16:30	MCSC	Adamson Lady Falcons	3–0	USPF Lady Panthers	25–15	25–10	25–16			75–41	
August 23	18:00	MCSC	Ateneo Blue Eagles	2–3	USC Lady Warriors	25–19	25–23	21–25	21–25	13–15	105–107	
August 24	16:00	MCSC	USPF Lady Panthers	1–3	USC Lady Warriors	25–22	17–25	23–25	14–25		79–97	
August 24	18:00	MCSC	Ateneo Blue Eagles	0–3	Adamson Lady Falcons	15–25	24–26	14–25			53–76	

=== Final standings ===
Rank	Team
1st place, gold medalist(s)	Adamson Lady Falcons
2nd place, silver medalist(s)	USC Lady Warriors
3rd place, bronze medalist(s)	Ateneo Blue Eagles
4	USPF Lady Panthers

2025 SSL National Invitationals Visayas Leg champions
Adamson Lady Falcons
1st title

Team Roster
Shaina Nitura (c), Felicity Sagaysay, Marie Sapienza, Abegail Segui, Marie Aseo, Lana Barrera, Red Bascon, Frances Mordi, Athea Aposaga, Juris Manuel, Rincess Date, Mary Del Moral, Kamille Dionisio, Kim Yra Rocha, Lhouriz Tuddao
Head coach
JP Yude

=== Individual award ===
Award	Player	Team	Ref.
Best Player of Visayas Leg	Shaina Nitura	Adamson	

=== Medalists ===
Gold	Silver	Bronze
Adamson Lady Falcons: Shaina Nitura (c); Marie Aseo; Lana Barrera; Red Bascon; Frances Mordi; Felicity Sagaysay; Marie Sapienza; Abegail Segui; Athea Aposaga; Juris Manuel; Princess Dote; Mary Del Moral; Kamille Dionisio; Kim Yra Rocha; Lhouriz Tuddao Head coach: JP Yude	USC Lady Warriors: Danielle Cuizon (c); Nova Seledio; Windifie Sasing; Jolly Velasquez; Abegail Bisnar; Julianne Yu; Franci Yu; Cindee Carumba; Ghanna Suan; Jerusha Atay; Angel Galinato; Izzy Villaganas; Esha Nasayao; Allyssah Diez Head coach: Grace Rosario Antigua	Ateneo Blue Eagles: Takako Fujimoto (c); Katherine Cortez; Mitzi Pacia; Grydelle Matibag; Gena May Hora; Ana Hermosura; Michaila Gulapa; Sophia Nisperos; Christen Quimpo; Fiona Arroyo; Jihan Chuatico; Dona Mae De Leon; Rosal Selga; Ma. Robielle Silla Head coach: Sergio Veloso

== Luzon Leg ==
=== Teams ===
Team	School	Association
Benilde Lady Blazers	De La Salle–College of Saint Benilde	NCAA
FEU Lady Tamaraws	Far Eastern University	UAAP
Letran Lady Knights	Colegio de San Juan de Letran	NCAA
UB Lady Brahmans	University of Batangas	UCAL

=== Preliminary round ===
- All times are Philippine Standard Time (UTC+8:00).
- The top team with the best win-loss record will be declared champions.

Pos	Team	Pld	W	L	Pts	SW	SL	SR	SPW	SPL	SPR	Qualification
1	FEU Lady Tamaraws	3	3	0	9	9	0	MAX	225	147	1.531	Champions
2	Benilde Lady Blazers	3	2	1	5	6	5	1.200	246	221	1.113	
3	Letran Lady Knights	3	1	2	4	5	6	0.833	232	248	0.935	
4	UB Lady Brahmans	3	0	3	0	0	9	0.000	138	225	0.613	

Date	Time	Venue		Score		Set 1	Set 2	Set 3	Set 4	Set 5	Total	Report
August 29	17:00	Millennium Gym	Letran Lady Knights	0–3	FEU Lady Tamaraws	13–25	17–25	21–25			51–75	
August 29	19:00	Millennium Gym	UB Lady Brahmans	0–3	Benilde Lady Blazers	8–25	17–25	15–25			40–75	
August 30	16:00	Millennium Gym	FEU Lady Tamaraws	3–0	UB Lady Brahmans	25–14	25–7	25–19			75–40	
August 30	18:00	Millennium Gym	Benilde Lady Blazers	3–2	Letran Lady Knights	27–29	25–22	25–22	23–25	15–8	115–106	
August 31	16:00	Millennium Gym	Letran Lady Knights	3–0	UB Lady Brahmans	25–22	25–16	25–20			75–58	
August 31	18:00	Millennium Gym	FEU Lady Tamaraws	3–0	Benilde Lady Blazers	25–21	25–16	25–19			75–56	

=== Final standings ===
Rank	Team
1st place, gold medalist(s)	FEU Lady Tamaraws
2nd place, silver medalist(s)	Benilde Lady Blazers
3rd place, bronze medalist(s)	Letran Lady Knights
4	UB Lady Brahmans

2025 SSL National Invitationals Luzon Leg champions
FEU Lady Tamaraws
1st title

Team Roster
Christine Ubaldo (c), Karyll Miranda, Faida Bakanke, Kyle Pendon, Lovely Rose Lopez, Mitzi Panangin, Clarisse Loresco, Allysa Gaile Devosora, Gerzel Mary Petallo, Audrey Izshca Santos, Jazzly Anne Ellarina, Ia Madane David, Mary Karylle Suplico, Margarett Louise Encarnacion
Head coach
Tina Salak

=== Individual award ===
Award	Player	Team	Ref.
Best Player of Luzon Leg	Faida Bakanke	FEU	

=== Medalists ===
Gold	Silver	Bronze
FEU Lady Tamaraws: Christine Ubaldo (c); Faida Bakanke; Kyle Pendon; Lovely Rose Lopez; Mitzi Panangin; Clarisse Loresco; Karyll Miranda; Alyzza Gaile Devosora; Mary Karylle Suplico; Gerzel Mary Petallo; Margarett Louise Encarnacion; Audrey Izshca Santos; Jazlyn Anne Ellarina; Ia Madane David Head coach: Tina Salak	Benilde Lady Blazers: Chenae Basarte (c); Camila Amor Bartolome; Fiona Naomi Getigan; Zen Reina Basilio; Francis Mae Flores; Rhea Mae Densing; Shekaina Rhedge Lleses; Shahannah Rheign Lleses; Fionna Marie Inocentes; Clydel Mae Catarig; Jessa Dorog; Cristy Ondangan; Arianna Raven Pua; Zamantha Nolasco Head coach: Jerry Yee	Letran Lady Knights: Lara Mae Silva (c); Judiel Marie Nitura; Angela Ann Louisse Zamudio; Leonilyn Padilla; Nizelle Aeriyen Martin; Princess Zyne Tumayao; Joralyn Panangin; Natalie Marie Estreller; Syra Joy Silorio; Verenicce Colendra; Sheena Vanessa Sarie; Lastlie Jade Isar; Nina Beatrice Maluto; Gia Marcel Maquilang Head coach: Aleksi Lahteenmaki
