= 2024 PNVF Champions League for Women =

Philippine women's volleyball tournament

2023 PNVF Champions League for Women
Tournament details
- Dates: February 4–10, 2024
- Teams: 5
- Venue: Rizal Memorial Coliseum

Final positions
- Champions: Petro Gazz Angels (1st title)
- Runners-up: Cignal HD Spikers
- Third place: Chery Tiggo Crossovers
- Fourth place: CSB Lady Blazers

Tournament awards
- MVP: Brooke Van Sickle (Petro Gazz)
- Best Setter: Gel Cayuna (Cignal)
- Best OH: Brooke Van Sickle (Petro Gazz); Jonah Sabete (Petro Gazz)
- Best MB: Abigail Maraño (Chery Tiggo); Remy Palma (Petro Gazz)
- Best OPP: Gayle Pascual (Benilde)
- Best Libero: Dawn Macandili-Catindig (Cignal)

Tournament statistics
- Matches played: 14

The women's division of the 2024 PNVF Champions League began on February 4 to 10, 2024, at the Rizal Memorial Coliseum, Manila, Philippines. This is the fourth edition of the PNVF tournament and its third edition as the PNVF Champions League.

A total of five teams competed for the championship title: the CSB Lady Blazers, Chery Tiggo Crossovers, Cignal HD Spikers, Petro Gazz Angels, and Philippine Army Lady Troopers.

Petro Gazz Angels won their first title of tournament.

== Participating teams ==
Club	Affiliation	Coach	Captain
Benilde Lady Blazers	De La Salle–College of Saint Benilde / Strong Group Athletics	Jerry Yee	Jessa Dorog
Chery Tiggo Crossovers	United Asia Automotive Group	Emilio Reyes Jr.	Abigail Maraño
Cignal HD Spikers	Cignal TV	Shaq Delos Santos	Frances Molina
PetroGazz Angels	PetroGazz Ventures Phils.	Koji Tsuzurabara	Remy Palma
Philippine Army Lady Troopers	Philippine Army	Randy Fallorina	Sarah Jane Gonzales

== Format ==
Preliminary Round

1. The five teams will compete in a single round-robin elimination.
2. Teams are ranked using the FIVB Ranking System.
3. Top four teams will advance to the semifinals.

Semifinals (knockout stage)

1. 1st ranked team vs. 4th ranked team
2. 2nd ranked team vs. 3rd ranked team

Finals (knockout stage)

1. Bronze medal: SF1 Loser vs. SF2 Loser
2. Gold medal: SF1 Winner vs. SF2 Winner

== Pool standing procedure ==
- First, teams are ranked by the number of matches won.
- If the number of matches won is tied, the tied teams are then ranked by match points, wherein:
  - Match won 3–0 or 3–1: 3 match points for the winner, 0 match points for the loser.
  - Match won 3–2: 2 match points for the winner, 1 match point for the loser.
- In case of any further ties, the following criteria shall be used:
1. Set ratio: number of sets won divided by number of sets lost.
2. Setpoint ratio: number of points scored divided by number of points allowed.
3. Head-to-head standings: any remaining tied teams are ranked based on the results of head-to-head matches involving the teams in question.

== Venue ==
All matches
Manila
Rizal Memorial Coliseum
Capacity: 10,000
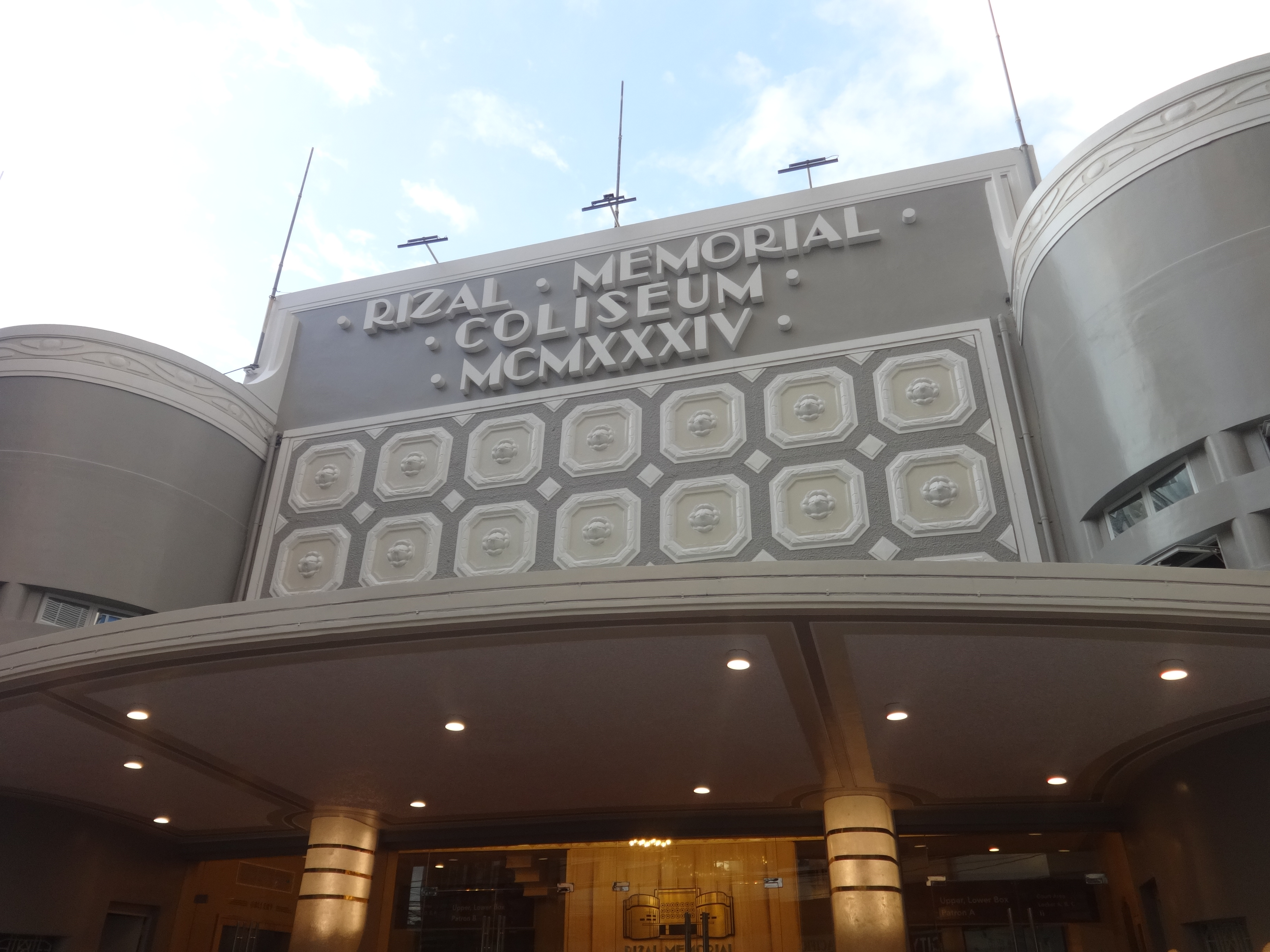

== Preliminary round ==
Pos	Team	Pld	W	L	Pts	SW	SL	SR	SPW	SPL	SPR	Qualification
1	Cignal HD Spikers	4	4	0	11	12	3	4.000	346	315	1.098	Final round
2	Chery Tiggo Crossovers	4	3	1	9	9	6	1.500	374	324	1.154	Final round
3	Petro Gazz Angels	4	2	2	6	8	6	1.333	311	294	1.058	Final round
4	CSB Lady Blazers	4	1	3	3	6	11	0.545	360	372	0.968	Final round
5	Philippine Army Lady Troopers	4	0	4	1	3	12	0.250	270	357	0.756	

Date	Time		Score		Set 1	Set 2	Set 3	Set 4	Set 5	Total	Report
4 Feb	15:30	Philippine Army Lady Troopers	0–3	Petro Gazz Angels	11–25	19–25	19–25			49–75	
4 Feb	18:00	Cignal HD Spikers	3–0	Chery Tiggo Crossovers	28–26	25–19	27–25			80–70	
5 Feb	15:30	Benilde Lady Blazers	3–2	Philippine Army Lady Troopers	16–25	25–16	25–27	25–14	15–9	106–91	
5 Feb	18:00	Petro Gazz Angels	1–3	Cignal HD Spikers	25–16	20–25	22–25	20–25		87–91	
6 Feb	15:30	Chery Tiggo Crossovers	3–1	Benilde Lady Blazers	29–27	27–29	25–18	25–23		106–97	
6 Feb	18:00	Cignal HD Spikers	3–0	Philippine Army Lady Troopers	25–21	25–20	25–16			75–57	
7 Feb	15:30	Benilde Lady Blazers	2–3	Cignal HD Spikers	25–18	17–25	21–25	25–17	13–15	101–100	
7 Feb	18:00	Petro Gazz Angels	1–3	Chery Tiggo Crossovers	23–25	9–25	25–23	17–25		74–98	
8 Feb	15:30	Chery Tiggo Crossovers	3–1	Philippine Army Lady Troopers	25–16	25–14	26–28	25–15		101–73	
8 Feb	18:00	Benilde Lady Blazers	0–3	Petro Gazz Angels	17–25	22–25	17–25			56–75	

== Final round ==
- All times are Philippine Standard Time (UTC+8:00).
- All are (knockout stage).

Semifinals
1	Cignal HD Spikers	3
4	CSB Lady Blazers	2
2	Chery Tiggo Crossovers	0
3	Petro Gazz Angels	3

Championship
Cignal HD Spikers	0
Petro Gazz Angels	3
3rd place
CSB Lady Blazers	0
Chery Tiggo Crossovers	3

=== Semifinals ===
==== SF1 vs SF4 ====
Date	Time		Score		Set 1	Set 2	Set 3	Set 4	Set 5	Total	Report
9 Feb	15:00	Cignal HD Spikers	3–2	CSB Lady Blazers	23–25	22–25	25–22	25–22	15–10	110–104	

==== SF2 vs SF3 ====
Date	Time		Score		Set 1	Set 2	Set 3	Set 4	Set 5	Total	Report
9 Feb	17:30	Chery Tiggo Crossovers	0–3	Petro Gazz Angels	21–25	19–25	14–25			54–75	

=== Finals ===
==== 3rd place ====
Date	Time		Score		Set 1	Set 2	Set 3	Set 4	Set 5	Total	Report
10 Feb	15:00	CSB Lady Blazers	0–3	Chery Tiggo Crossovers	20–25	13–25	13–25			46–75	

==== Championship ====
Date	Time		Score		Set 1	Set 2	Set 3	Set 4	Set 5	Total	Report
10 Feb	17:30	Cignal HD Spikers	0–3	Petro Gazz Angels	19–25	25–27	22–25			66–77	

== Final standing ==
Rank	Team
1st place, gold medalist(s)	Petro Gazz Angels
2nd place, silver medalist(s)	Cignal HD Spikers
3rd place, bronze medalist(s)	Chery Tiggo Crossovers
4	CSB Lady Blazers
5	Philippine Army Lady Troopers

2024 PNVF Champions League for Women champions
Petro Gazz Angels
1st title

== Awards and medalists ==
=== Individual awards ===
Award	Player	Team	Ref.
Most Valuable Player	Brooke Van Sickle	Petro Gazz	
1st Best Outside Spiker	Brooke Van Sickle	Petro Gazz	
2nd Best Outside Spiker	Jonah Sabete	Petro Gazz	
1st Best Middle Blocker	Abigail Maraño	Chery Tiggo	
2nd Best Middle Blocker	Remy Palma	Petro Gazz	
Best Opposite Spiker	Gayle Pascual	Benilde	
Best Setter	Gel Cayuna	Cignal	
Best Libero	Dawn Macandili-Catindig	Cignal	

== See also ==
- 2024 PNVF Champions League for Men
