= 2024 V-League Collegiate Challenge =

2024 collegiate volleyball league

- League: V-League (Philippines)
- Sport: Volleyball
- Duration: July 28 – October 4, 2024
- Matches: M: 37; W: 29
- Teams: M: 8; W: 7
- TV partner: Solar Sports
- Season MVP: M Gboy De Vega (UST); W Angeline Poyos (UST)
- Finals champions: M FEU Tamaraws; W UST Golden Tigresses
- Runners-up: M De La Salle Green Spikers; W FEU Lady Tamaraws
- Finals MVP: M Zhydryx Saavedra (FEU); W Ma. Cassandra Rae Carballo (UST)

V-League seasons
- ← 2023 2025 →

The 2024 V-League Collegiate Challenge was the third season of the revival of the V-League. The tournament starts on July 28, 2024, at the Paco Arena in Manila, with both divisions having eight competing teams.

== Participating teams ==
2024 V-League Collegiate Challenge
Team	School	Collegiate League
Men's division
Ateneo Blue Eagles	Ateneo de Manila University	UAAP
De La Salle Green Spikers	De La Salle University	UAAP
EAC Generals	Emilio Aguinaldo College	NCAA
FEU Tamaraws	Far Eastern University	UAAP
Letran Knights	Colegio de San Juan de Letran	NCAA
NU Bulldogs	National University	UAAP
Perpetual Altas	University of Perpetual Help System DALTA	NCAA
UST Golden Spikers	University of Santo Tomas	UAAP
Women's division
Benilde Lady Blazers	De La Salle–College of Saint Benilde	NCAA
FEU Lady Tamaraws	Far Eastern University	UAAP
Letran Lady Knights	Colegio de San Juan de Letran	NCAA
Lyceum Lady Pirates	Lyceum of the Philippines University	NCAA
~~NU Lady Bulldogs~~ ^{a}	~~National University~~	~~UAAP~~
UE Lady Warriors	University of the East	UAAP
UP Fighting Maroons	University of the Philippines	UAAP
UST Golden Tigresses	University of Santo Tomas	UAAP

Note
a. The NU Lady Bulldogs have withdrawn from the tournament due to their participation in two international training camps in Taiwan and the VTV Cup in Ninh Binh, Vietnam. As a result, their four-set win over Letran will not be counted in the standings.

== Venues ==
Preliminary Round	Final Round
Manila	Pasig
Paco Arena	PhilSports Arena
Capacity: 1,000	Capacity: 10,000

== Format ==
Preliminary round

1. Single-round robin preliminaries; 8 teams; teams are ranked using the FIVB Ranking System.
2. Top four teams will advance to the semifinals.

Semifinals (best-of-three series)

1. SF1: rank #1 versus rank #4
2. SF2: rank #2 versus rank #3

Finals

1. Bronze medal (knockout series): SF1L vs. SF2L
2. Gold medal (best-of-three series): SF1W vs. SF2W

== Pool standing procedure ==
- First, teams are ranked by the number of matches won.
- If the number of matches won is tied, the tied teams are then ranked by match points, wherein:
  - Match won 3–0 or 3–1: 3 match points for the winner, 0 match points for the loser.
  - Match won 3–2: 2 match points for the winner, 1 match point for the loser.
- In case of any further ties, the following criteria shall be used:
  - Set ratio: the number of sets won divided by number of sets lost.
  - Point ratio: the number of points scored divided by the number of points allowed.
  - Head-to-head standings: any remaining tied teams are ranked based on the results of head-to-head matches involving the teams in question.

== Squads ==
=== Men's line-up ===
Ateneo Blue Eagles
No.	Player name	Position
1	OKEKE, Chidiebere	OH
3	GUTIERREZ, Lorenzo Samuel	S
4	GOPIO, Jettlee	MB
5	BATAS, Kennedy	OP
6	TANEO, Lutrelle Andre	OH
7	ALEJOS, Kristofer Rodge	MB
9	REYES, Karl	OP
10	BAHIA, Gian Sebastian	S
11	TALUBAN, Ejira Kayelle	S
12	JUSTO, Ian	L
13	DE CASTRO, Lance Andrei (C)	L
14	YU, Julio Miguel	OP
16	ALMADRO, Andrei John	OH
17	SENDON, Jeric	MB
18	SALARZON, Jian Matthew	OH
19	QUIJANO, Christan David	L
21	BATAC, Tim Rodniel	MB
22	SULAY, Kirk Thomas	OH
24	CORRIGEDOR, Karl Genellez	MB
25	TOPACIO, Matteo Olegario	MB
	MANGULABNAN, Vince	Coach
		Assistant

De La Salle Green Spikers
No.	Player name	Position
1	MENDOZA, Uriel	OH
2	GUERRERO, Menard (C)	OH/OP
3	ADAJAR, Jerico	S
4	FORTUNA, Michael John	OP
5	MARATA, Von	OP
6	RETIRO, Sherwin	L
7	LAYUG, Eric Paolo	MB
8	POQUITA, Diogenes III	S
9	KAMPTON, Noel Michael	OH
10	ESPEJO, Andre	MB
11	GLORIA, Eugene	OH
12	ENCARNARCION, Simon Joseph	S
13	DEL PILAR, Nathanie	MB
14	FLORES, Neil Laurence	L
15	MAGALAMAN, Joshua	MB
16	DE CASTRO, Jonathan	L
18	HERNANDEZ, Chris Emmanuel	OH
19	FLORES, Robert	L
20	VENTURA, Glen Rui	OP
25	FALSIS, Andraie Jara	OH
28	RODRIGUEZ, Joshua Jamiel	MB
	ROQUE, Jose	Coach
	ASIA, Geuel	Assistant

EAC Generals
No.	Player name	Position
1	ROSAGARAN, Edward Karlson	S
2	SANTIAGO, Basty	MB
3	OSABEL, Ervin Patrick	OH
5	MAGPANTAY, Jan Francis	L
6	CANDELARIA, Aeric John	OH
7	CABRERA, Bryan Jay	OP
8	TACULOG, Frelwin	OH
9	PALATINO, Mark	OH
10	SANTOS, Mark Joseph	L
11	GURA, Paul Edward	MB
12	IGDANES, Kent Bryan	S
14	ABOR, Jan Ruther	OP
15	BATIANCILA, Kenneth (C)	MB
16	GANTE, Dave	S
17	SABELLA, Randy Jr.	MB
18	BABILA, Jose Leonard	MB
	PALMERO, Rodrigo	Coach
	GERELLA, Sid Raymund	Assistant

FEU Tamaraws
No.	Player name	Position
1	CEBALLOS, Vennie Paul	L
2	CODILLA, Jomel	OH
3	CACAO, Ariel	S
4	DE GUZMAN, Bryce	L
5	ESPARTERO, Mikko	OH
6	TANDOC, Kyle	OH
7	PANGILINAN, Keith	MB
8	TALISAYAN, Jerold (C)	OH
9	SAAVEDRA, Zhydryx	OP
10	ADECIR, Glen	OH
11	MENDOZA, Lirick	MB
12	CEJALES, Jacob	L
14	DU-OT, Rhodson	S
15	DELICANA, Andrei	OH
17	MARTINEZ, Benny	S
19	BITUIN, Amet	OP
22	ABSIN, Charles	MB
24	GARRIEDO, Judi	MB
25	MIGUEL, Luis	OH
27	NDONGALA, Doula	MB
	ORCULLO, Eddieson	Coach
	MANALON, F./BALDOMERO	Assistant

NU Bulldogs
No.	Player name	Position
2	ANCHETA, Greg Augustus Luis	S
3	GALLEGO, Jeffe	S
4	HERNANDEZ, Michael Jonas	L
5	ABANILLA, Jan Llanfred	OP
6	BUDDIN, Michaelo	OH
7	PARCE, Kharylle Rhoy	MB
10	MUKABA, Obed	MB
11	DISQUITADO, Jade Alex	OH
12	TAGUIBOLOS, Rwenzmel	MB
14	ORDIALES, Leo	OP
15	ESTRADA, John Vincent	MB
16	PARREÑO, Kade	L
17	GAPULTOS, Jimwell	L
18	ARINGO, Leo Jr. (C)	OH
19	DOROMAL, Joelbert	OH
23	DIAO, Jenngerard Arnfranz	MB
24	BANDOLA, Mac Arvin	OH
	SOLAMILLO, Janrey	OH
	ALINSUNURIN, Dante Jr.	Coach
	DELA CRUZ, Ariel	Assistant

Perpetual Altas
No.	Player name	Position
1	LITUANIA, John Exequel	S
2	MARAPOC, Jefferson	OH
3	PASCUA, James	OH
4	TABUGA, Kobe	OH
5	GELOGO, Kylle	MB
6	ANDRADE, KC (C)	MB
7	MOHAMMAD, Zain	OH
10	BOENEL, Jester	MB
11	MATEO, Klint	OP
12	ABRENCILLO, Magrey	L
14	FAVILA, Justine	S
15	ARROZADO, Dexter	OH
16	ROSOS, Kirth	MB
17	CASTIL, John	MB
19	MANALOTO, Hezron	OP
21	GALILA, Annrhey	L
	ACAYLAR, Zinfronio	Coach
	CARINO, Michael/ MARCELO, J.	Assistant

Letran Knights
No.	Player name	Position
1	HIMZON, Vince Virrey	MB
2	VICENTE, Lorenz	OH
3	STA. MARIA, Steven	MB
4	ARAÑO, John Wayne	S
5	CORDERO, Luke	L
6	BERMIDO, Felix	MB
7	SACAY, Yewoshua Mael	S
8	TIMBREZA, Simon	Lq
9	DE GUZMAN, Mark	OH
10	JUMAPIT, Jeffrey	OH
11	SANTIAGUDO, Jero	MB
12	BAUTISTA, John Derrick	OH
13	CATRIS, Raxel (C)	L
14	CABALLERO, Namron	MB
15	LARDIZABAL, Dave Thomas	MB
16	AMBROCIO, Christer Lou	OH
17	ABETO, Andrew	OH
18	BARBA, Arieh	OH
21	DOMALANTA, Dennis	MB
22	SUMAGAYSAY, John	S
	ESQUIBEL, Brian	Coach
	MANALON, Ferdinand	Assistant

UST Golden Spikers
No.	Player name	Position
1	DE VEGA, Rey Miguel	OH
2	SALVADOR, Kenneth John	OH
3	YAMANAKA, Ryuichi Isaiah	L
5	MACAM, Jan	OH
6	DEDOROY, John Emmanuel Jr.	OH
7	YAMBAO, Dux Euan (C)	S
8	COLINARES, Edlyn Paul	MB
9	AVILA, Joshua	S
10	DE LA NOCHE, Jay Rack	OP
12	ALABAR, Ed	L
13	YBANEZ, Josh	OH
14	VALERA, Trevor	MB
15	UMANDAL, Sherwin	OP
17	COLINARES, Ennius Gwen	S
18	SALI, Al-Bukharie	OP
21	CATAP, Neil	MB
23	LUNA, Migs	L
24	LARDIZABAL, Patrick John	MB
25	DADO, Eljohn	MB
26	MALABUNGA, Karbe	MB
	MAMON, Odjie	Coach
	MAPE, Benjamin	Assistant

Legend
S	Setter
MB	Middle Blocker
OH	Outside Hitter
OP	Opposite Hitter
L	Libero
(C)	Team Captain

=== Women's line-up ===
Benilde Lady Blazers
No.	Player name	Position
1	BASARTE, Chenae	S
2	LLESES, Shekaina Rhedge	OH
3	LLESES, Shahanna Rheign	OH
4	ESTENZO Kim Alison	L
5	GETIGAN, Fiona Naomi	L
6	BASILIO, Zen Reina	S
9	DENSING, Rhea Mae	OH
10	GO, Francis Mycah	OH
11	BADION, Sophia Margarette	MB
12	APOSTOL, Corrine Allyson	OH
14	ESTOQUE, Wielyn	OH
15	INOCENTES, Fiona Marie	MB
16	CATARIG, Clydel Mae	OP
17	DOROG, Jessa (C)	OH
18	ONDANGAN, Cristy	OP
19	BORROMEO, Mary Grace	OH
21	NOLASCO, Zamantha	MB
	FLORES, Francis Mae	
	ESTUDILLO, Juliana Marie	
	YEE, Jerry	Coach
	CHUA, Jay	Assistant

FEU Lady Tamaraws
No.	Player name	Position
1	BAKANKE, Faida	OP
2	PONS, Melody	OH
4	TRUZ, Karyme Isabella	MB
5	UBALDO, Christine (C)	S
6	LOPEZ, Lovely Rose	OH
7	ASIS, Ann Roselle	MB
9	TAGAOD, Chenie	OH
10	PAPA, Florize Anne	OP
11	MIRANDA, Karyll	S
13	DEVOSORA, Alyssa	OH
15	PETALLO, Gerzel Mary	OH
16	PENDON, Kyle	OP
17	ENCARNACION, Margarett Louise	L
19	ASIS, Jean	MB
20	MONARES, Julianne	L
21	ELLARINA, Jazlyn Anne	MB
22	PREMAYLON, Frenchie	OH
23	LORESCO, Clarisse	MB
24	SUPLICO, Mary Karylle	L
	RAMOS, Christine Dominique	S
	SALAK, Tina	Coach
	REFUGIA, M./BARRICA, J.	Assistant

Letran Lady Knights
No.	Player name	Position
1	NITURA, Marie Judiel	OH
2	CASTRO, Julienne Rose	OH
3	DELA CRUZ, Royce	MB
4	CALIXTO, Christine Kate	OH
5	ALMIRANTE, Keiara	OP
6	LEDESMA, Angelique	MB
7	MARTIN, Nizelle Aeriyen	OH
8	TUMAYAO, Princess Zyne	S
9	PANANGIN, Joralyn	OH
10	ESTRELLER, Natalie Marie	S
11	PADILLA, Leonilyn	MB
12	COLENDRA, Verenicce	OP
14	ENVERGA, Marbey Allen	L
16	ISAR, Lastlie Jade	MB
17	TAPANG, Lea Rizel	OH
19	SILVA, Lara Mae (C)	L
21	SARIE, Sheena Vanessa	OH
22	YAP, Aziejay Andrea	S
25	MAQUILANG, Gia Marcel	OH
	ALMADRO, Oliver	Coach
	DIMACULANGAN, R.	Assistant

Lyceum Lady Pirates
No.	Player name	Position
1	PEREZ, Ana Mae	OH
2	GUZMAN, Angelica Blue	L
3	MARTIN, Vanessa Yvonne	MB
4	DE GUZMAN, Joann Faeith	OH
5	CRUZ, Angelica	MB
6	TULANG, Janeth	OP
7	RIVAS, Marcela Angela	L
8	LOPEZ, Stacey Denise	OH
9	DELA CRUZ, Roxie	OH
10	PUZON, Venice (C)	S
11	GALEDO, Kareina Paula	S
12	DOGUNA, Joan	OH
13	SAGAYNO, Marinella	OH
15	DOLORITO, Johna Denise	OH
16	OSADA, Hiromi	MB
19	BIO, Heart	MB
20	MUSCHILLAS, Ashley	OP
	BORBON, Arabella	MB
	MACALINTAL, Havanna Reigh	MB
	GARCIA, Crowwel	Coach
	WANTA, C.	Assistant

NU Lady Bulldogs
No.	Player name	Position
1	BOMBITA, Nathasza Kaye	OP
3	PONO, Abegail (C)	S
4	BELEN, Mhicaela	OH
5	JARDIO, Shaira Mae	L
6	ALINSUG, Evangeline	OH
7	ESCANLAR, Ruth Terri	OH
8	TORING, Sheena	MB
9	BELLO, Aishat	MB
10	MATA, Alexa Nicole	MB
12	SOLOMON, Alyssa	OP
13	LAMINA, Camilla	S
16	BARROGA, Marishka	L
17	MAAYA, Minierva	MB
18	PANIQUE, Arah Ellah	OH
19	MARSH, Celine	OH
21	ESCANLAR, Myrtle	OH
23	TIZON, Carlyn Natalie	OH
24	SALAZAR, Josline	OP
	MAURICIO, Chaitlin	S
	BAJAMONDE, Rashel	MB
	PANIQUE, Abigail	OH
	SANTICO, Angela Lourdes	OH
	DIMACULANGAN, Ray	Coach
	QUITCO, K.	Assistant

UE Lady Warriors
No.	Player name	Position
1	CEPADA, KC	OH
2	BALINGIT, Kayce	OH
3	ECALLA, Mary Christine	OP
5	UMAYAM, Jenalyn	OH
6	CASTILLO, Claire Angela	OH
7	GAJERO, Jelaica Faye	OP
8	ROJO, Yesha Keith	MB
9	DONGALLO, Casiey Monique	OH
10	FERNANDEZ, Shamel Gracen	L
11	FAMULAGAN, Keshia Marie	MB
12	MADRIAGA, Kizzie (C)	S
13	ENRIQUEZ, Roanne	MB
14	CAÑETE, Ashley	OP
16	ZAMUDIO, Beatrice Anne	OH
17	GINOO, Lauritz	OH
18	MPATA, Nahomie	MB
19	NOGALES, Riza	MB
20	REYES, Angelica	L
	LORONO, Honey	OP
	VITAL, Obet	Coach
	CHOLICO, S.	Assistant

UP Fighting Maroons
No.	Player name	Position
1	SASONDONCILLO, Lavhinia Jean	L
2	CAPISTRANO, Gisha Niccaleigh	L
3	YTANG, Niña	MB
4	MAGSOMBOL, Mikaela Alexa	S
5	GOULD, Jenn	OH
6	OLANGO, Kianne Louise	OP
7	CELIS. Ma. Dannica (C)	MB
9	BANSIL, Bienne Louise	MB
10	JABONETA, Irah Anika	OH
11	CABASAC, Kyrzten Annikha	OP
13	ALI, Sarah	MB
12	DOERING, Kassandra	MB
15	DE GUIA, Frances Harriette	S
17	RAMOS, Jothea Mae	OP
18	LAUCHENGCO, Denise Arichgrace	OH
20	PEREZ, Joanneesse	L
22	MANGUILIMOTAN, Jaz	S
23	NOCEJA, Yesha	OH
	BACLAY, Jan Halley	MB
	GAMBOA, Cassandra	MB
	ALMADRO, Oliver	Coach
	GOJOL, M.A.	Assistant

UST Golden Tigresses
No.	Player name	Position
1	PENAFIEL, Renee Lou	OH
2	ARASAN, Stephanie Bien	OH
3	KNOP, Ashley Dianne	OH
4	PEPITO, Ma. Bernadett (C)	L
5	WAJE, Arlene	S
6	HUYNO, Kaizah	MB
7	RAMERI, Franzine Ozmarrah	L
8	ALTEA, Margaret	OP
9	CHUA, Ysabelle	U
11	ABBU, Athena Sophia	MB
12	OSIS, Francine Anne	MB
13	PERDIDO, Jona	OH
14	ESCOBER, Sandrine	L
16	CARBALLO, Ma. Cassandra Rae	S
17	POYOS, Angeline	OH
18	JURADO, Regina Grace	OP
19	CORONADO, Mary Joe	MB
20	BANAGUA, Mary Margarett	MB
21	CORDORA, Kyla	OH
25	UNEKWE, Blessing Ezinne	MB
	REYES, Emilio Jr.	Coach
	FERNANDEZ C./GIRON L.	Assistant

== Men's tournament ==
- All times are Philippine Standard Time (UTC+8:00).

=== Preliminary round ===
==== Ranking ====
Pos	Team	Pld	W	L	Pts	SW	SL	SR	SPW	SPL	SPR	Qualification
1	FEU Tamaraws	7	6	1	19	20	6	3.333	640	566	1.131	Semifinals
2	De La Salle Green Spikers	7	5	2	15	15	7	2.143	538	504	1.067	Semifinals
3	UST Golden Spikers	7	5	2	14	17	10	1.700	640	594	1.077	Semifinals
4	NU Bulldogs	7	5	2	14	16	10	1.600	609	584	1.043	Semifinals
5	Perpetual Altas	7	4	3	11	17	15	1.133	657	685	0.959	
6	Letran Knights	7	2	5	7	11	15	0.733	589	596	0.988	
7	Ateneo Blue Eagles	7	1	6	5	9	18	0.500	565	600	0.942	
8	EAC Generals	7	1	6	2	3	20	0.150	437	546	0.800	

Source: V-League

==== Match results ====
Date	Time	Venue		Score		Set 1	Set 2	Set 3	Set 4	Set 5	Total	Report
28 Jul	15:00	PAC	De La Salle Green Spikers	3–0	Letran Knights	25–19	27–25	28–26			80–70	P2
28 Jul	17:00	PAC	EAC Generals	0–3	Ateneo Blue Eagles	13–25	23–25	22–25			58–75	P2
31 Jul	10:00	PAC	Perpetual Altas	1–3	NU Bulldogs	21–25	25–22	14–25	22–25		82–97	P2
31 Jul	12:00	PAC	FEU Tamaraws	3–1	UST Golden Spikers	32–30	27–29	25–17	25–20		109–96	P2
04 Aug	10:00	PAC	NU Bulldogs	3–0	EAC Generals	25–19	25–23	25–15			75–57	P2
04 Aug	12:00	PAC	Ateneo Blue Eagles	1–3	FEU Tamaraws	26–24	22–25	18–25	27–29		93–103	P2
07 Aug	15:00	PAC	Letran Knights	2–3	Perpetual Altas	19–25	22–25	25–20	25–21	13–15	104–106	P2
07 Aug	17:00	PAC	UST Golden Spikers	1–3	De La Salle Green Spikers	19–25	25–27	25–23	20–25		89–100	P2
11 Aug	15:00	PAC	NU Bulldogs	1–3	UST Golden Spikers	26–28	25–20	23–25	24–26		98–99	P2
11 Aug	17:00	PAC	Ateneo Blue Eagles	0–3	Letran Knights	22–25	22–25	16–25			60–75	P2
14 Aug	10:00	PAC	De La Salle Green Spikers	3–0	EAC Generals	25–15	25–22	25–21			75–58	P2
14 Aug	12:00	PAC	Perpetual Altas	3–2	FEU Tamaraws	23–25	15–25	26–24	25–21	15–6	104–101	P2
18 Aug	10:00	PAC	Ateneo Blue Eagles	0–3	De La Salle Green Spikers	21–25	29–31	19–25			69–81	P2
18 Aug	12:00	PAC	UST Golden Spikers	3–2	Perpetual Altas	25–18	25–22	23–25	23–25	15–9	111–99	P2
21 Aug	15:00	PAC	FEU Tamaraws	3–0	NU Bulldogs	25–18	25–18	25–23			75–59	P2
21 Aug	17:00	PAC	EAC Generals	0–3	Letran Knights	15–25	21–25	18–25			54–75	P2
25 Aug	15:00	PAC	De La Salle Green Spikers	0–3	FEU Tamaraws	21–25	18–25	18–25			57–75	P2
25 Aug	17:00	PAC	NU Bulldogs	3–2	Ateneo Blue Eagles	27–25	16–25	21–25	27–25	15–11	106–111	P2
28 Aug	12:00	PAC	Letran Knights	1–3	UST Golden Spikers	23–25	12–25	25–20	18–25		78–95	P2
28 Aug	14:00	PAC	Perpetual Altas	2–3	EAC Generals	25–18	20–25	17–25	25–11	9–15	96–94	P2
01 Sep	12:00	PAC	EAC Generals	0–3	UST Golden Spikers	18–25	17–25	19–25			54–75	P2
01 Sep	14:00	PAC	FEU Tamaraws	3–1	Letran Knights	26–24	22–25	25–19	29–27		102–95	P2
08 Sep	15:00	PAC	FEU Tamaraws	3–0	EAC Generals	25–19	25–21	25–22			75–62	P2
08 Sep	17:00	PAC	De La Salle Green Spikers	3–0	Perpetual Altas	27–25	25–22	25–21			77–68	P2
11 Sep	10:00	PAC	Letran Knights	1–3	NU Bulldogs	23–25	25–23	20–25	24–26		92–99	P2
11 Sep	12:00	PAC	UST Golden Spikers	3–0	Ateneo Blue Eagles	25–22	25–16	25–18			75–56	P2
13 Sep	15:00	PAC	Ateneo Blue Eagles	2–3	Perpetual Altas	22–25	25–15	25–22	16–25	13–15	101–102	P2
13 Sep	17:00	PAC	NU Bulldogs	3–0	De La Salle Green Spikers	25–23	25–22	25–23			75–68	P2

=== Final round ===
- All times are Philippine Standard Time (UTC+8:00).
- Battle for bronze is a knockout match.
- Championship is a best-of-three series.

Semifinals
1	FEU Tamaraws	3	3
4	NU Bulldogs	1	0
2	De La Salle Green Spikers	1	3	3
3	UST Golden Spikers	3	0	2

Championship
FEU Tamaraws	3	1	3
De La Salle Green Spikers	1	3	0
Third place
NU Bulldogs	3
UST Golden Spikers	0

==== Semifinals ====
Rank 1 vs Rank 4

Date	Time	Venue		Score		Set 1	Set 2	Set 3	Set 4	Set 5	Total	Report
18 Sep	10:00	PSA	FEU Tamaraws	3–1	NU Bulldogs	25–23	25–20	24–26	25–16		99–85	P2
22 Sep	17:00	PSA	NU Bulldogs	0–3	FEU Tamaraws	13–25	20–25	21–25			54–75	P2

Rank 2 vs Rank 3

Date	Time	Venue		Score		Set 1	Set 2	Set 3	Set 4	Set 5	Total	Report
18 Sep	12:00	PSA	De La Salle Green Spikers	1–3	UST Golden Spikers	25–22	23–25	15–25	16–25		79–97	P2
22 Sep	15:00	PSA	UST Golden Spikers	0–3	De La Salle Green Spikers	18–25	20–25	23–25			61–75	P2
25 Sep	17:00	PSA	De La Salle Green Spikers	3–2	UST Golden Spikers	25–23	26–24	23–25	23–25	15–11	112–108	P2

==== 3rd place match ====
Date	Time	Venue		Score		Set 1	Set 2	Set 3	Set 4	Set 5	Total	Report
29 Sep	10:00	PSA	NU Bulldogs	3–0	UST Golden Spikers	25–19	34–32	31–29			90–80	P2

==== Championship ====
Date	Time	Venue		Score		Set 1	Set 2	Set 3	Set 4	Set 5	Total	Report
29 Sep	17:00	PSA	FEU Tamaraws	3–1	De La Salle Green Spikers	25–22	25–20	18–25	25–19		93–86	P2
02 Oct	14:00	PSA	De La Salle Green Spikers	3–1	FEU Tamaraws	25–21	25–19	21–25	25–20		96–85	P2
04 Oct	17:00	PSA	FEU Tamaraws	3–0	De La Salle Green Spikers	25–22	28–26	25–18			78–66	P2

2024 V-League Collegiate Challenge Men's Champions
FEU Tamaraws
1st title

== Women's tournament ==
- All times are Philippine Standard Time (UTC+8:00).

=== Preliminary round ===
==== Ranking ====
Pos	Team	Pld	W	L	Pts	SW	SL	SR	SPW	SPL	SPR	Qualification
1	UST Golden Tigresses	6	6	0	17	18	5	3.600	545	453	1.203	Semifinals
2	UE Lady Warriors	6	4	2	10	13	11	1.182	519	524	0.990	Semifinals
3	FEU Lady Tamaraws	6	3	3	11	13	9	1.444	492	455	1.081	Semifinals
4	Benilde Lady Blazers	6	3	3	10	11	9	1.222	443	422	1.050	Semifinals
5	UP Fighting Maroons	6	3	3	9	11	12	0.917	477	499	0.956	
6	Letran Lady Knights	6	2	4	5	8	15	0.533	474	532	0.891	
7	Lyceum Lady Pirates	6	0	6	1	5	18	0.278	477	542	0.880	

Source: V-League

==== Match results ====
Date	Time	Venue		Score		Set 1	Set 2	Set 3	Set 4	Set 5	Total	Report
28 Jul	10:00	PAC	Lyceum Lady Pirates	1–3	UST Golden Tigresses	22–25	25–23	20–25	17–25		84–98	P2
28 Jul	12:00	PAC	Letran Lady Knights	3–2	UP Fighting Maroons	19–25	21–25	25–19	25–19	15–8	105–96	P2
31 Jul	15:00	PAC	FEU Lady Tamaraws	2–3	UP Fighting Maroons	25–20	19–25	24–26	25–17	14–16	107–104	P2
31 Jul	17:00	PAC	UE Lady Warriors	3–0	Benilde Lady Blazers	25–22	25–23	25–21			75–66	P2
04 Aug	15:00	PAC	Benilde Lady Blazers	0–3	FEU Lady Tamaraws	16–25	14–25	22–25			52–75	P2
04 Aug	17:00	PAC	UST Golden Tigresses	3–1	UE Lady Warriors	25–14	25–19	24–26	25–19		99–78	P2
07 Aug	10:00	PAC	UP Fighting Maroons	3–1	Lyceum Lady Pirates	25–16	25–23	15–25	25–20		90–84	P2
~~07 Aug~~	~~12:00~~	~~PAC~~	~~NU Lady Bulldogs~~	~~3–1~~	~~Letran Lady Knights~~	25–23	25–21	23–25	25–11		98–80	~~P2~~
11 Aug	10:00	PAC	Benilde Lady Blazers	3–0	UP Fighting Maroons	25–13	25–22	25–21			75–56	P2
11 Aug	12:00	PAC	FEU Lady Tamaraws	0–3	UST Golden Tigresses	23–25	16–25	13–25			52–75	P2
14 Aug	15:00	PAC	Lyceum Lady Pirates	0–3	FEU Lady Tamaraws	16–25	18–25	26–28			60–78	P2
18 Aug	17:00	PAC	Benilde Lady Blazers	3–0	Letran Lady Knights	25–21	25–22	25–21			75–64	P2
21 Aug	10:00	PAC	UE Lady Warriors	0–3	UP Fighting Maroons	15–25	16–25	22–25			53–75	P2
25 Aug	10:00	PAC	UST Golden Tigresses	3–2	Benilde Lady Blazers	25–16	19–25	14–25	25–22	15–12	98–100	P2
25 Aug	12:00	PAC	Letran Lady Knights	0–3	FEU Lady Tamaraws	16–25	22–25	15–25			53–75	P2
28 Aug	17:00	PAC	Lyceum Lady Pirates	2–3	UE Lady Warriors	25–17	23–25	25–23	22–25	11–15	106–105	P2
01 Sep	17:00	PAC	Letran Lady Knights	1–3	UE Lady Warriors	9–25	23–25	25–22	16–25		73–97	P2
08 Sep	10:00	PAC	Letran Lady Knights	3–1	Lyceum Lady Pirates	20–25	25–21	26–24	25–19		96–89	P2
08 Sep	12:00	PAC	FEU Lady Tamaraws	2–3	UE Lady Warriors	21–25	26–24	23–25	25–22	10–15	105–111	P2
11 Sep	15:00	PAC	UP Fighting Maroons	0–3	UST Golden Tigresses	15–25	14–25	23–25			52–75	P2
11 Sep	17:00	PAC	Benilde Lady Blazers	3–0	Lyceum Lady Pirates	25–23	25–11	25–20			75–54	P2
13 Sep	12:00	PAC	UST Golden Tigresses	3–1	Letran Lady Knights	25–15	25–22	25–27	25–19		100–83	P2

=== Final round ===
- All times are Philippine Standard Time (UTC+08:00).
- Battle for bronze is a knockout match.
- Championship is a best-of-three series.

Semifinals
1	UST Golden Tigresses	3	3
4	Benilde Lady Blazers	0	0
2	UE Lady Warriors	0	0
3	FEU Lady Tamaraws	3	3

Championship
UST Golden Tigresses	3	2	3
FEU Lady Tamaraws	0	3	1
Third place
UE Lady Warriors	3
Benilde Lady Blazers	2

==== Semifinals ====
Rank 1 vs Rank 4

Date	Time	Venue		Score		Set 1	Set 2	Set 3	Set 4	Set 5	Total	Report
18 Sep	15:00	PSA	UST Golden Tigresses	3–0	Benilde Lady Blazers	25–20	25–16	25–13			75–49	P2
22 Sep	12:00	PSA	Benilde Lady Blazers	0–3	UST Golden Tigresses	23–25	15–25	20–25			58–75	P2

Rank 2 vs Rank 3

Date	Time	Venue		Score		Set 1	Set 2	Set 3	Set 4	Set 5	Total	Report
18 Sep	17:00	PSA	UE Lady Warriors	0–3	FEU Lady Tamaraws	21–25	15–25	20–25			56–75	P2
22 Sep	10:00	PSA	FEU Lady Tamaraws	3–0	UE Lady Warriors	25–20	25–19	25–21			75–60	P2

==== 3rd place match ====
Date	Time	Venue		Score		Set 1	Set 2	Set 3	Set 4	Set 5	Total	Report
29 Sep	12:00	PSA	Benilde Lady Blazers	2–3	UE Lady Warriors	25–23	25–18	18–25	23–25	11–15	102–106	P2

==== Championship ====
Date	Time	Venue		Score		Set 1	Set 2	Set 3	Set 4	Set 5	Total	Report
29 Sep	15:00	PSA	FEU Lady Tamaraws	0–3	UST Golden Tigresses	22–25	18–25	14–25			54–75	P2
02 Oct	17:00	PSA	UST Golden Tigresses	2–3	FEU Lady Tamaraws	23–25	25–22	21–25	25–19	15–17	109–108	P2
04 Oct	14:00	PSA	FEU Lady Tamaraws	1–3	UST Golden Tigresses	26–24	20–25	21–25	14–25		81–99	P2

2024 V-League Collegiate Challenge Women's Champions
UST Golden Tigresses
1st title

== Awards and medalists ==
=== Individual awards ===
Award	Men's	Women's	Ref.
Conference Most Valuable Player	Rey Miguel De Vega	Angeline Poyos	
Finals Most Valuable Player	Zhydryx Saavedra	Ma. Cassandra Rae Carballo	
Best Setter	Jerico Adajar	Ma. Cassandra Rae Carballo	
1st Best Outside Spiker	Jerold Talisayan	Wielyn Estoque	
2nd Best Outside Spiker	Chris Hernandez	Chenie Tagaod	
1st Best Middle Blocker	Edlyn Colinares	Zamantha Nolasco	
2nd Best Middle Blocker	Joshua Magalaman	Mary Banagua	
Best Opposite Spiker	Zhydryx Saavedra	Regina Jurado	
Best Libero	Menard Guerrero	Ma. Bernadett Pepito	

=== Medalists ===
Division	Gold	Silver	Bronze
Men's	FEU Tamaraws: Jerold Talisayan (c); Vennie Paul Ceballos; Jomel Codilla; Ariel Cacao; Bryce De Guzman; Mikko Espartero; Kyle Tandoc; Keith Pangilinan; Zhydryx Saavedra; Glen Adecir; Lirick Mendoza; Jacob Cejales; Rhodson Du-ot; Andrei Delicana; Benny Martinez; Amet Butuin; Charles Absin; Judi Garriedo; Luis Miguel; Doula Ndongala Head Coach: Eddieson Orcullo	De La Salle Green Spikers: Menard Guerrero (c); Uriel Mendoza; Jerico Adajar; Michael John Fortuna; Von Marata; Sherwin Retiro; Eric Paolo Layug; Diogenes Poquita III; Noel Michael Kampton; Andre Espejo; Eugene Gloria; Simon Joseph Encarnacion; Nathanie Del Pilar; Neil Laurence Flores; Joshua Magalaman; Jonathan De Castro; Chris Emmanuel Hernandez; Robert Flores; Glen Rui Ventura; Andraie Jara Falsis; Joshua Jamiel Rodriguez Head Coach: Jose Roque	NU Bulldogs: Leo Aringo (c); Greg Augustus Luis Ancheta; Jeffe Gallego Jr.; Jan Llanfred Abanilla; Leo Ordiales; Jenngerard Diao; John Vincent Estrada; Obed Mukaba; Rhoy Parce; Rwenzmel Taguibolos; Jimwell Gapultos; Michael Jonas Hernandez; John Kade Parreño; Mac Arvin Bandola; Michaelo Buddin; Jade Disquitado; Joelbert Doromal; Janrey Solamillo Head Coach: Dante Alinsunurin Jr.
Women's	UST Golden Tigresses: Ma. Bernadett Pepito (c); Renee Lou Penafiel; Stephanie Bien Arasan; Ashley Dianne Knop; Arlene Waje; Kaizah Huyno; Franzine Ozmarrah Rameri; Margaret Altea; Ysabelle Chua; Athena Sophia Abbu; Francine Ann Osis; Jona Perdido; Sandrine Escober; Ma. Cassandra Rae Carballo; Angeline Poyos; Regina Grace Jurado; Mary Joe Coronado; Mary Margarett Banagua; Kyla Cordora; Blessing Ezinne Unekwe Head Coach: Emilio Reyes Jr.	FEU Lady Tamaraws: Christine Ubaldo (c); Faida Bakanke; Melody Pons; Karyme Isabella Truz; Lovely Rose Lopez; Ann Roselle Asis; Chenie Tagaod; Florize Anne Papa; Karyll Miranda; Alyssa Devosora; Gerzel Mary Petallo; Kyle Pendon; Margarett Louise Encarnacion; Jean Asis; Julianne Monares; Jazlyn Anne Ellarina; Frenchie Premaylon; Clarisse Loresco; Mary Karylle Suplico; Christine Dominique Ramos Head Coach: Tina Salak	UE Lady Warriors: Kizzie Madriaga (c); Ashley Cañete; Mary Christine Ecalla; Jelaica Gajero; Honey Lorono; Roanne Enriquez; Keshia Marie Famulagan; Nahomie Mpata; Riza Nogales; Yesha Keith Rojo; Gracen Shamel Fernandez; Angelica Reyes; Beatrice Anne Zamudio; Kayce Balingit; Claire Angela Castillo; KC Cepada; Casiey Monique Dongallo; Lautriz Ginoo; Jenalyn Umayam Head Coach: Dr. Obet E. Vital

== Final standings ==
Rank	Men's	Women's
1st place, gold medalist(s)	FEU Tamaraws	UST Golden Tigresses
2nd place, silver medalist(s)	De La Salle Green Spikers	FEU Lady Tamaraws
3rd place, bronze medalist(s)	NU Bulldogs	UE Lady Warriors
4	UST Golden Spikers	Benilde Lady Blazers
5	Perpetual Altas	UP Fighting Maroons
6	Letran Knights	Letran Lady Knights
7	Ateneo Blue Eagles	Lyceum Lady Pirates
8	EAC Generals	

== See also ==
- 2024 Shakey's Super League National Invitationals
- 2024 Shakey's Super League Pre-season Championship
