= 2023 PNVF Challenge Cup – Women's Division =

Philippine women's volleyball tournament

2023 PNVF Challenge Cup Women's Division
Tournament details
- Dates: November 7–25, 2023
- Teams: 16
- Venue: Rizal Memorial Coliseum

Final positions
- Champions: DLS College of Saint Benilde (1st title)
- Runners-up: University of the Philippines
- Third place: Colegio de San Juan de Letran
- Fourth place: Philippine Air Force

Tournament awards
- MVP: Wielyn Estoque (Benilde)
- Best Setter: Chenae Basarte (Benilde)
- Best OH: Wielyn Estoque (Benilde); Lea Rizel Tapang (Letran)
- Best MB: Zamantha Nolasco (Benilde); Niña Ytang (UP)
- Best OPP: Stephanie Bustrillo (UP)
- Best Libero: Fiona Getigan (Benilde)

Tournament statistics
- Matches played: 32

The women's division of the 2023 PNVF Challenge Cup began on November 7, 2023.

Starting from this season, the tournament formerly known as the PNVF Champions League would be known as the PNVF Challenge Cup. This marks as the third season of the league.

DLS College of Saint Benilde were the champions.

== Participating teams ==
The tournament was originally meant to enable local government units (cities, municipalities, and provinces) to hold their own volleyball programs. The Challenge Cup would be opened for school and club teams. By the end of October 2023, the PNVF has secured commitment from 17 women's teams. A team from Tagaytay previously committed to take part but withdrew which meant a total of 16 teams took part.

Club/Team	Sponsor	Locality
Arellano University	—N/a	Manila
Colegio de San Juan de Letran	—N/a	Manila
Davao City	—N/a	Davao City
De La Salle University–Dasmariñas	—N/a	Dasmariñas
De La Salle–College of Saint Benilde	—N/a	Manila
José Rizal University	—N/a	Mandaluyong
Lyceum of the Philippines University-Batangas	—N/a	Batangas City
Parañaque City	—N/a	Parañaque City
Philippine Air Force	Philippine Air Force	—N/a
Rizal Technological University–Basilan	—N/a	Basilan
San Beda University	—N/a	Manila
Tacloban–Eastern Visayas Fighting Warays	—N/a	Tacloban
University of Batangas	—N/a	Batangas City
University of the Philippines	—N/a	Quezon City
UP Volleyball Club	—N/a	Quezon City
Volida Volleyball Club	—N/a	Manila

== Format ==
The following format will be conducted for the entirety of the conference:

Preliminary Round

1. Single-round robin preliminaries; 16 teams; 4 pools; Teams are ranked using the FIVB Ranking System.
2. The top two teams in each pool will qualified for the final round

Quarterfinal (knockout stage)

1. QF1: #A1 vs. #D2
2. QF3: #C1 vs. #B2
3. QF2: #B1 vs. #C2
4. QF4: #D1 vs. #A2

Semifinal (knockout stage)

1. SF1: QF1 winner vs. QF3 winner
2. SF2: QF2 winner vs. QF4 winner

Finals (knockout stage)

1. Bronze medal: SF1 Loser vs SF2 Loser
2. Gold medal: SF1 Winner vs SF2 Winner

== Pools composition ==
The 16 teams were divided into four pools.

Pool A	Pool B	Pool C	Pool D
DLS College of Saint Benilde	Philippine Air Force	Arellano University	University of the Philippines
Volida Volleyball Club	José Rizal University	Colegio de San Juan de Letran	San Beda University
UP Volleyball Club	Davao City	University of Batangas	LPU–Batangas
Parañaque City	Tacloban Fighting Warays	RTU–Basilan	DLSU–Dasmariñas

== Venue ==
All matches
Manila
Rizal Memorial Coliseum
Capacity: 10,000
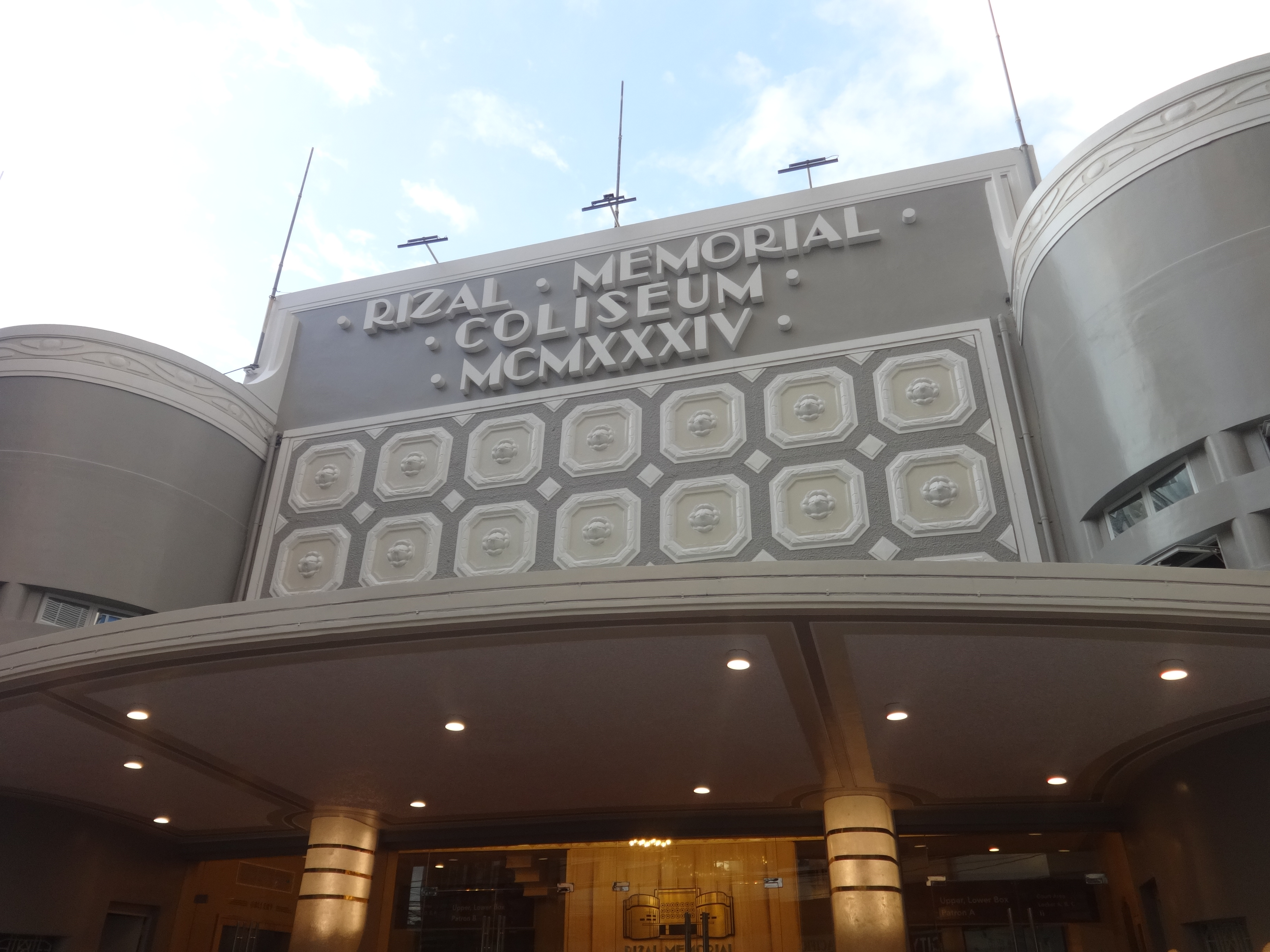

== Preliminary round ==
- All times are Philippine Standard Time (UTC+8:00).

=== Pool A ===
Pos	Team	Pld	W	L	Pts	SW	SL	SR	SPW	SPL	SPR	Qualification
1	DLS College of Saint Benilde	3	3	0	9	9	0	MAX	225	133	1.692	Quarterfinals
2	UP Volleyball Club	3	2	1	6	6	4	1.500	224	190	1.179	Quarterfinals
3	Parañaque City	3	1	2	3	4	7	0.571	204	242	0.843	
4	Volida Volleyball Club	3	0	3	0	1	9	0.111	110	163	0.675	

Source: PNVF

Date	Time	Venue		Score		Set 1	Set 2	Set 3	Set 4	Set 5	Total	Report
07 Nov	08:00	RMC	DLS College of Saint Benilde	3–0	Parañaque City	25–6	25–20	25–17			75–43	
09 Nov	08:00	RMC	UP Volleyball Club	0–3	DLS College of Saint Benilde	20–25	18–25	10–25			48–75	
14 Nov	16:00	RMC	Parañaque City	3–1	Volida Volleyball Club	25–15	25–10	13–25	25–18		88–68	
16 Nov	08:00	RMC	Volida Volleyball Club	0–3	DLS College of Saint Benilde	12–25	12–25	18–25			42–75	
19 Nov	08:00	RMC	UP Volleyball Club	3–0	Volida Volleyball Club	25–11	25–15	25–16			75–42	
21 Nov	11:00	RMC	Parañaque City	1–3	UP Volleyball Club	18–25	10–25	28–26	17–25		73–101	

=== Pool B ===
Pos	Team	Pld	W	L	Pts	SW	SL	SR	SPW	SPL	SPR	Qualification
1	Philippine Air Force	3	3	0	9	9	1	9.000	249	181	1.376	Quarterfinals
2	Jose Rizal University	3	2	1	6	6	3	2.000	209	173	1.208	Quarterfinals
3	Davao City	3	1	2	3	4	6	0.667	214	236	0.907	
4	Tacloban Fighting Warays	3	0	3	0	0	9	0.000	151	233	0.648	

Source: PNVF

Date	Time	Venue		Score		Set 1	Set 2	Set 3	Set 4	Set 5	Total	Report
14 Nov	18:00	RMC	Philippine Air Force	3–1	Davao City	25–23	25–15	24–26	25–11		99–75	
15 Nov	16:00	RMC	Davao City	0–3	Jose Rizal University	19–25	16–25	21–25			56–75	
17 Nov	08:00	RMC	Jose Rizal University	0–3	Philippine Air Force	21–25	21–25	17–25			59–75	
17 Nov	12:00	RMC	Tacloban Fighting Warays	0–3	Davao City	13–25	18–25	31–33			62–83	
18 Nov	10:00	RMC	Philippine Air Force	3–0	Tacloban Fighting Warays	25–12	25–20	25–15			75–47	
19 Nov	12:00	RMC	Tacloban Fighting Warays	0–3	Jose Rizal University	13–25	16–25	13–25			42–75	

=== Pool C ===
Pos	Team	Pld	W	L	Pts	SW	SL	SR	SPW	SPL	SPR	Qualification
1	Colegio de San Juan de Letran	3	3	0	9	9	1	9.000	247	186	1.328	Quarterfinals
2	Arellano University	3	2	1	5	6	5	1.200	235	232	1.013	Quarterfinals
3	RTU–Basilan	3	1	2	4	6	6	1.000	249	260	0.958	
4	University of Batangas	3	0	3	0	0	9	0.000	172	225	0.764	

Source: PNVF

Date	Time	Venue		Score		Set 1	Set 2	Set 3	Set 4	Set 5	Total	Report
07 Nov	10:00	RMC	RTU–Basilan	1–3	Colegio de San Juan de Letran	22–25	11–25	25–22	13–25		71–97	
08 Nov	18:00	RMC	Arellano University	3–0	University of Batangas	25–18	25–17	25–19			75–54	
16 Nov	10:00	RMC	Colegio de San Juan de Letran	3–0	Arellano University	25–21	25–10	25–20			75–51	
16 Nov	12:00	RMC	University of Batangas	0–3	RTU–Basilan	19–25	20–25	15–25			54–75	
18 Nov	08:00	RMC	Arellano University	3–2	RTU–Basilan	21–25	25–19	23–25	25–22	15–12	109–103	
21 Nov	09:00	RMC	University of Batangas	0–3	Colegio de San Juan de Letran	22–25	19–25	23–25			64–75	

=== Pool D ===
Pos	Team	Pld	W	L	Pts	SW	SL	SR	SPW	SPL	SPR	Qualification
1	University of the Philippines	3	3	0	9	9	2	4.500	270	193	1.399	Quarterfinals
2	San Beda University	3	2	1	6	7	3	2.333	234	195	1.200	Quarterfinals
3	DLSU–Dasmariñas	3	1	2	3	4	6	0.667	194	228	0.851	
4	LPU–Batangas	3	0	3	0	0	9	0.000	143	225	0.636	

Source: PNVF

Date	Time	Venue		Score		Set 1	Set 2	Set 3	Set 4	Set 5	Total	Report
07 Nov	12:00	RMC	DLSU–Dasmariñas	0–3	San Beda University	19–25	17–25	16–25			52–75	
08 Nov	16:00	RMC	LPU–Batangas	0–3	University of the Philippines	14–25	11–25	17–25			42–75	
09 Nov	10:00	RMC	University of the Philippines	3–1	DLSU–Dasmariñas	25–16	25–27	25–8	25–16		100–67	
15 Nov	18:00	RMC	DLSU–Dasmariñas	3–0	LPU–Batangas	25–20	25–18	25–15			75–53	
17 Nov	10:00	RMC	San Beda University	3–0	LPU–Batangas	25–17	25–13	25–18			75–48	
19 Nov	10:00	RMC	San Beda University	1–3	University of the Philippines	25–20	17–25	22–25	20–25		84–95	

== Final round ==
- All times are Philippine Standard Time (UTC+8:00).

Quarterfinals
November 22
A1	DLS College of Saint Benilde	3
D2	San Beda University	1
November 22
C1	Colegio de San Juan de Letran	3
B2	Jose Rizal University	1
November 22
B1	Philippine Air Force	3
C2	Arellano University	0
November 22
D1	University of the Philippines	3
A2	UP Volleyball Club	1

Semifinals
November 24
DLS College of Saint Benilde	3
Colegio de San Juan de Letran	0
November 24
Philippine Air Force	1
University of the Philippines	3

Championship
November 25
DLS College of Saint Benilde	3
University of the Philippines	0
Third place
November 25
Colegio de San Juan de Letran	3
Philippine Air Force	0

=== Quarterfinals ===
Date	Time		Score		Set 1	Set 2	Set 3	Set 4	Set 5	Total	Report
22 Nov	10:00	DLS College of Saint Benilde	3–1	San Beda University	25–14	23–25	25–13	25–20		98–72	
22 Nov	12:30	Colegio de San Juan de Letran	3–1	Jose Rizal University	25–20	21–25	25–19	25–15		96–79	
22 Nov	15:00	Philippine Air Force	3–0	Arellano University	25–22	25–17	25–14			75–53	
22 Nov	17:30	University of the Philippines	3–1	UP Volleyball Club	25–15	18–25	25–21	26–24		94–85	

=== Semifinals ===
Date	Time		Score		Set 1	Set 2	Set 3	Set 4	Set 5	Total	Report
24 Nov	10:00	DLS College of Saint Benilde	3–0	Colegio de San Juan de Letran	25–20	25–17	25–16			75–53	
24 Nov	12:30	Philippine Air Force	1–3	University of the Philippines	18–25	18–25	25–19	18–25		79–94	

=== Finals ===
==== Bronze Medal Match ====
Date	Time		Score		Set 1	Set 2	Set 3	Set 4	Set 5	Total	Report
25 Nov	12:30	Colegio de San Juan de Letran	3–0	Philippine Air Force	25–15	25–15	25–19			75–49	

==== Gold Medal Match ====
Date	Time		Score		Set 1	Set 2	Set 3	Set 4	Set 5	Total	Report
25 Nov	15:00	DLS College of Saint Benilde	3–0	University of the Philippines	18–25	18–25	13–25			49–75	

== Final standing ==
Rank	Team
1st place, gold medalist(s)	DLS College of Saint Benilde
2nd place, silver medalist(s)	University of the Philippines
3rd place, bronze medalist(s)	Colegio de San Juan de Letran
4	Philippine Air Force
5	San Beda University
6	Jose Rizal University
7	UP Volleyball Club
8	Arellano University
9	RTU–Basilan
10	Davao City
11	DLSU–Dasmariñas
12	Parañaque City
13	Volida Volleyball Club
14	University of Batangas
15	Tacloban Fighting Warays
16	LPU–Batangas

2023 PNVF Challenge Cup Women's Champions
DLS College of Saint Benilde
1st title

== Awards ==
=== Individual awards ===
Award	Player	Team	Ref.
Most Valuable Player	Wielyn Estoque	Benilde	
1st Best Outside Spiker	Wielyn Estoque	Benilde	
2nd Best Outside Spiker	Lea Rizel Tapang	Letran	
1st Best Middle Blocker	Zamantha Nolasco	Benilde	
2nd Best Middle Blocker	Niña Ytang	UP	
Best Opposite Spiker	Stephanie Bustrillo	UP	
Best Setter	Chenae Basarte	Benilde	
Best Libero	Fiona Getigan	Benilde	

== See also ==
- 2023 PNVF Challenge Cup – Men's Division
