= Faida Bakanke =

Congolese volleyball player (born 2002)

Personal information
- Born: 27 March 2002 (age 24); Kinshasa, DR Congo
- Height: 168 cm (5 ft 6 in)
- Weight: 52 kg (115 lb)
- Education: FEU (2023–2026)

Volleyball information
- Position: Outside hitter
- Current club: VNVB

Career
Years	Teams
2026–	VNVB

Faida Bakanke is a volleyball player from the Democratic Republic of the Congo.

== Early life and education ==
Faida Bakanke was born on 27 March 2002 in Kinshasa in the Democratic Republic of the Congo. She later studied at the Far Eastern University (FEU) in Manila, Philippines for her collegiate studies.

== Career ==
=== College ===
Faida Bakanke played as an opposite hitter for the FEU Lady Tamaraws of the University Athletic Association of the Philippines (UAAP). Bakanke has helped the Tamaraws win a silver medal at the 2023 V-League Collegiate Challenge and a bronze in the 2023 Shakey's Super League Pre-season Championship

She made her UAAP debut for the Tamaraws in Season 86 in early 2024. She played for a total of three seasons with FEU finishing fifth place in Season 88.

Bakanke forgoes her final year of eligibility in the UAAP in June 2026.

=== Professional ===
Bakanke went professional with Vandoeuvre Nancy Volley-Ball (VNVB) of LNV Ligue A Féminine of France.
