= 2022 V-League Collegiate Challenge =

2022 collegiate volleyball competition

- League: V-League
- Sport: Volleyball
- Duration: M: October 16 – December 2, 2022; W: October 19 – November 30, 2022
- Matches: M: 48; W: 26
- Teams: M: 12; W: 8
- Total attendance: 12299
- TV partner: CNN Philippines
- Season MVP: M: Angelo Nicolas Almendras (NU); W: Faith Nisperos (Ateneo)
- Men's champions: NU Bulldogs
- Men's runners-up: UST Golden Spikers
- Women's champions: Ateneo Blue Eagles
- Women's runners-up: Adamson Lady Falcons
- Finals MVP: M: Angelo Nicolas Almendras (NU); W: Faith Nisperos (Ateneo)

V-League seasons
- ← 2016 (SVL) 2023 →

The 2022 V-League Collegiate Challenge was the first season of the revival of the V-League of the Philippines. It is the inaugural competition of the V-League as a standalone tournament after being tied with Shakey's Pizza in the past as their title sponsor.

The tournament began on October 16 for men's with 12 teams while October 19 for women's with 8 teams.

== Participating teams ==
Team	School	Collegiate league
Men's division
Adamson Soaring Falcons	Adamson University	UAAP
Arellano Chiefs	Arellano University	NCAA
Ateneo Blue Eagles	Ateneo de Manila University	UAAP
Benilde Blazers	De La Salle–College of Saint Benilde	NCAA
De La Salle Green Spikers	De La Salle University	UAAP
FEU Tamaraws	Far Eastern University	UAAP
NU Bulldogs	National University	UAAP
Perpetual Altas	University of Perpetual Help System DALTA	NCAA
San Beda Red Spikers	San Beda University	NCAA
San Sebastian Stags	San Sebastian College – Recoletos	NCAA
UP Fighting Maroons	University of the Philippines	UAAP
UST Golden Spikers	University of Santo Tomas	UAAP
Women's division
Adamson Lady Falcons	Adamson University	UAAP
Ateneo Blue Eagles	Ateneo de Manila University	UAAP
Benilde Lady Blazers	De La Salle–College of Saint Benilde	NCAA
FEU Lady Tamaraws	Far Eastern University	UAAP
San Beda Lady Red Spikers	San Beda University	NCAA
San Sebastian Lady Stags	San Sebastian College – Recoletos	NCAA
UP Fighting Maroons	University of the Philippines	UAAP
UST Golden Tigresses	University of Santo Tomas	UAAP

== Pools composition ==
=== Men's ===
Pool A	Pool B
Adamson Soaring Falcons	Ateneo Blue Eagles
Arellano Chiefs	FEU Tamaraws
Benilde Blazers	Perpetual Altas
De La Salle Green Spikers	San Beda Red Spikers
NU Bulldogs	San Sebastian Stags
UST Tiger Spikers	UP Fighting Maroons

=== Women's ===
Pool A	Pool B
Adamson Lady Falcons	Benilde Lady Blazers
Ateneo Blue Eagles	San Beda Lady Red Spikers
FEU Lady Tamaraws	UP Fighting Maroons
San Sebastian Lady Stags	UST Golden Tigresses

== Venue ==
All matches
Manila
Paco Arena
Capacity: 1,000

== Format ==
=== Men's ===
Preliminary round

1. Single-round robin preliminaries; 2 pools (6 teams each); Teams are ranked using the FIVB Ranking System.
2. Top four teams from each pools will advance to the quarterfinals.
3. Bottom two teams from each pools will battle for 9th–12th places classification.

Quarterfinals (knockout series)

1. QF1: A1 vs. B4
2. QF2: B2 vs. A3
3. QF3: B1 vs. A4
4. QF4: A2 vs. B3
5. Losing teams will battle for 5th–8th places classification.

Semifinals (knockout series)

1. SF1: QFW1 vs. QFW2
2. SF2: QFW3 vs. QFW4

Finals

1. Bronze medal: SF1L vs. SF2L
2. Gold medal (best-of-three series): SF1W vs. SF2W

=== Women's ===
Preliminary round

1. Single-round robin preliminaries; 2 pools (4 teams each); Teams are ranked using the FIVB Ranking System.
2. All teams will advance to the quarterfinals.

Quarterfinals (knockout series)

1. QF1: A1 vs. B4
2. QF2: B2 vs. A3
3. QF3: B1 vs. A4
4. QF4: A2 vs. B3
5. Losing teams will battle for 5th–8th places classification.

Semifinals (knockout series)

1. SF1: QFW1 vs. QFW2
2. SF2: QFW3 vs. QFW4

Finals

1. Bronze medal: SF1L vs. SF2L
2. Gold medal (best-of-three series): SF1W vs. SF2W

== Pool standing procedure ==
- First, teams are ranked by the number of matches won.
- If the number of matches won is tied, the tied teams are then ranked by match points, wherein:
  - Match won 3–0 or 3–1: 3 match points for the winner, 0 match points for the loser.
  - Match won 3–2: 2 match points for the winner, 1 match point for the loser.
- In case of any further ties, the following criteria shall be used:
  - Set ratio: the number of sets won divided by number of sets lost.
  - Point ratio: the number of points scored divided by the number of points allowed.
  - Head-to-head standings: any remaining tied teams are ranked based on the results of head-to-head matches involving the teams in question.

== Men's tournament ==
=== Preliminary round ===
- All times are Philippine Standard Time (UTC+8:00).

==== Pool A ====
Pos	Team	Pld	W	L	Pts	SW	SL	SR	SPW	SPL	SPR	Qualification
1	NU Bulldogs	5	5	0	15	15	1	15.000	398	294	1.354	Quarterfinals
2	UST Tiger Spikers	5	4	1	11	12	7	1.714	432	396	1.091	Quarterfinals
3	Arellano Chiefs	5	2	3	7	10	9	1.111	425	436	0.975	Quarterfinals
4	De La Salle Green Spikers	5	2	3	7	9	10	0.900	413	433	0.954	Quarterfinals
5	Adamson Soaring Falcons	5	1	4	3	4	13	0.308	356	412	0.864	9th–12th places
6	Benilde Blazers	5	1	4	2	4	14	0.286	373	426	0.876	9th–12th places

Date	Time		Score		Set 1	Set 2	Set 3	Set 4	Set 5	Total	Report
16 Oct	10:00	Benilde Blazers	1–3	Adamson Soaring Falcons	21–25	26–28	25–23	16–25		88–101	P2
16 Oct	15:00	De La Salle Green Spikers	3–1	Arellano Chiefs	25–19	27–25	22–25	30–28		104–97	P2
21 Oct	10:00	NU Bulldogs	3–0	Benilde Blazers	25–15	25–17	25–20			75–52	P2
21 Oct	15:00	Arellano Chiefs	2–3	UST Tiger Spikers	19–25	25–19	25–21	22–25	13–15	104–105	P2
23 Oct	13:00	UST Tiger Spikers	0–3	NU Bulldogs	22–25	19–25	15–25			56–75	P2
23 Oct	17:00	Adamson Soaring Falcons	0–3	De La Salle Green Spikers	18–25	16–25	16–25			50–75	P2
4 Nov	08:00	De La Salle Green Spikers	2–3	Benilde Blazers	18–25	20–25	28–26	25–23	8–15	99–114	P2
4 Nov	10:00	Arellano Chiefs	1–3	NU Bulldogs	13–25	25–23	20–25	15–25		73–98	P2
6 Nov	10:00	UST Tiger Spikers	3–1	De La Salle Green Spikers	25–19	22–25	25–15	25–23		97–82	P2
6 Nov	15:00	NU Bulldogs	3–0	Adamson Soaring Falcons	25–17	25–22	25–21			75–60	P2
9 Nov	13:00	De La Salle Green Spikers	0–3	NU Bulldogs	20–25	15–25	18–25			53–75	P2
11 Nov	10:00	Adamson Soaring Falcons	1–3	UST Tiger Spikers	13–25	25–27	25–22	19–25		82–99	P2
11 Nov	15:00	Benilde Blazers	0–3	Arellano Chiefs	20–25	22–25	24–26			66–76	P2
13 Nov	13:00	Adamson Soaring Falcons	0–3	Arellano Chiefs	22–25	21–25	20–25			63–75	P2
13 Nov	17:00	Benilde Blazers	0–3	UST Tiger Spikers	19–25	16–25	18–25			53–75	P2

==== Pool B ====
Pos	Team	Pld	W	L	Pts	SW	SL	SR	SPW	SPL	SPR	Qualification
1	Ateneo Blue Eagles	5	4	1	12	13	6	2.167	449	411	1.092	Quarterfinals
2	Perpetual Altas	5	4	1	11	13	6	2.167	436	384	1.135	Quarterfinals
3	FEU Tamaraws	5	3	2	9	12	9	1.333	431	414	1.041	Quarterfinals
4	San Beda Red Spikers	5	3	2	9	10	8	1.250	410	411	0.998	Quarterfinals
5	UP Fighting Maroons	5	1	4	3	6	13	0.462	427	460	0.928	9th–12th places
6	San Sebastian Stags	5	0	5	0	1	15	0.067	336	409	0.822	9th–12th places

Date	Time		Score		Set 1	Set 2	Set 3	Set 4	Set 5	Total	Report
16 Oct	13:00	San Beda Red Spikers	1–3	Ateneo Blue Eagles	19–25	25–17	17–25	23–25		84–92	P2
16 Oct	17:00	San Sebastian Stags	1–3	UP Fighting Maroons	23–25	33–31	14–25	23–25		93–106	P2
21 Oct	08:00	Ateneo Blue Eagles	3–0	San Sebastian Stags	25–17	25–20	25–17			75–54	P2
21 Oct	13:00	UP Fighting Maroons	1–3	San Beda Red Spikers	25–21	16–25	26–28	24–26		91–100	P2
21 Oct	17:00	FEU Tamaraws	2–3	Perpetual Altas	25–21	20–25	25–20	19–25	6–15	95–106	P2
23 Oct	10:00	San Beda Red Spikers	0–3	FEU Tamaraws	17–25	18–25	19–25			54–75	P2
23 Oct	15:00	Perpetual Altas	3–0	UP Fighting Maroons	25–18	25–18	25–17			75–53	P2
4 Nov	13:00	Ateneo Blue Eagles	3–1	FEU Tamaraws	19–25	28–26	25–18	25–21		97–90	P2
6 Nov	13:00	Perpetual Altas	3–1	Ateneo Blue Eagles	22–25	25–19	25–22	25–22		97–88	P2
6 Nov	17:00	San Beda Red Spikers	3–0	San Sebastian Stags	25–23	27–25	25–22			77–70	P2
9 Nov	10:00	FEU Tamaraws	3–1	UP Fighting Maroons	25–23	19–25	25–19	26–24		95–91	P2
11 Nov	13:00	Perpetual Altas	1–3	San Beda Red Spikers	18–25	22–25	25–20	18–25		83–95	P2
11 Nov	17:00	San Sebastian Stags	0–3	FEU Tamaraws	20–25	24–26	22–25			66–76	P2
13 Nov	10:00	San Sebastian Stags	0–3	Perpetual Altas	17–25	17–25	19–25			53–75	P2
13 Nov	15:00	UP Fighting Maroons	1–3	Ateneo Blue Eagles	25–22	22–25	22–25	17–25		86–97	P2

=== Final round ===
- All times are Philippine Standard Time (UTC+8:00).

==== 9th–12th places ====
9th–12th semifinals
November 18
A5	Adamson Soaring Falcons	3
B6	San Sebastian Stags	0
November 18
B5	UP Fighting Maroons	3
A6	Benilde Blazers	2

9th place match
November 20
Adamson Soaring Falcons	0
UP Fighting Maroons	3
11th place match
November 20
San Sebastian Stags	0
Benilde Blazers	3

===== 9th–12th semifinals =====
Date	Time		Score		Set 1	Set 2	Set 3	Set 4	Set 5	Total	Report
18 Nov	15:00	Adamson Soaring Falcons	3–0	San Sebastian Stags	25–21	25–18	25–21			75–60	P2
18 Nov	17:00	UP Fighting Maroons	3–2	Benilde Blazers	21–25	22–25	25–22	26–24	15–11	109–107	P2

===== 11th place match =====
Date	Time		Score		Set 1	Set 2	Set 3	Set 4	Set 5	Total	Report
20 Nov	17:00	San Sebastian Stags	0–3	Benilde Blazers	23–25	10–25	15–25			48–75	P2

===== 9th place match =====
Date	Time		Score		Set 1	Set 2	Set 3	Set 4	Set 5	Total	Report
20 Nov	10:00	Adamson Soaring Falcons	0–3	UP Fighting Maroons	15–25	19–25	23–25			57–75	P2

==== Final eight ====
5th place match
November 25
San Beda Red Spikers	3
FEU Tamaraws	2
7th place match
November 25
Arellano Chiefs	1
De La Salle Green Spikers	3

5th–8th semifinals
November 23
San Beda Red Spikers	3
Arellano Chiefs	0
November 23
De La Salle Green Spikers	2
FEU Tamaraws	3

Quarterfinals
November 13
A1	NU Bulldogs	3
B4	San Beda Red Spikers	0
November 13
B2	Perpetual Altas	3
A3	Arellano Chiefs	1
November 16
B1	Ateneo Blue Eagles	3
A4	De La Salle Green Spikers	0
November 16
A2	UST Tiger Spikers	3
B3	FEU Tamaraws	2

Semifinals
November 23
NU Bulldogs	3
Perpetual Altas	0
November 23
Ateneo Blue Eagles	1
UST Tiger Spikers	3

Championship
November 27 – December 2
NU Bulldogs	3	2	3
UST Tiger Spikers	0	3	0
3rd place match
November 27
Perpetual Altas	3
Ateneo Blue Eagles	0

===== Quarterfinals =====
Date	Time		Score		Set 1	Set 2	Set 3	Set 4	Set 5	Total	Report
16 Nov	10:00	NU Bulldogs	3–0	San Beda Red Spikers	25–15	25–21	25–23			75–59	P2
16 Nov	13:00	Perpetual Altas	3–1	Arellano Chiefs	26–28	25–20	25–21	25–16		101–85	P2
16 Nov	15:00	Ateneo Blue Eagles	3–0	De La Salle Green Spikers	25–23	25–17	27–25			77–65	P2
16 Nov	17:00	UST Tiger Spikers	3–2	FEU Tamaraws	19–25	24–26	25–21	27–25	15–13	110–110	P2

===== 5th–8th semifinals =====
Date	Time		Score		Set 1	Set 2	Set 3	Set 4	Set 5	Total	Report
23 Nov	10:00	San Beda Red Spikers	3–0	Arellano Chiefs	25–15	25–19	25–17			75–51	P2
23 Nov	13:00	De La Salle Green Spikers	2–3	FEU Tamaraws	20–25	20–25	25–23	25–22	9–15	99–110	P2

===== 7th place match =====
Date	Time		Score		Set 1	Set 2	Set 3	Set 4	Set 5	Total	Report
25 Nov	10:00	Arellano Chiefs	1–3	De La Salle Green Spikers	25–21	18–25	21–25	22–25		86–96	P2

===== 5th place match =====
Date	Time		Score		Set 1	Set 2	Set 3	Set 4	Set 5	Total	Report
25 Nov	13:00	San Beda Red Spikers	3–2	FEU Tamaraws	16–25	25–20	20–25	25–21	15–10	101–101	P2

===== Semifinals =====
Date	Time		Score		Set 1	Set 2	Set 3	Set 4	Set 5	Total	Report
23 Nov	15:00	NU Bulldogs	3–0	Perpetual Altas	25–22	25–22	25–16			75–60	P2
23 Nov	17:00	Ateneo Blue Eagles	1–3	UST Tiger Spikers	27–25	17–25	20–25	16–25		80–100	P2

===== 3rd place match =====
Date	Time		Score		Set 1	Set 2	Set 3	Set 4	Set 5	Total	Report
27 Nov	17:00	Perpetual Altas	3–0	Ateneo Blue Eagles	25–21	25–21	25–20			75–62	P2

===== Championship =====
Date	Time		Score		Set 1	Set 2	Set 3	Set 4	Set 5	Total	Report
27 Nov	10:00	NU Bulldogs	3–0	UST Tiger Spikers	25–19	25–21	25–19			75–59	P2
30 Nov	14:00	UST Tiger Spikers	3–2	NU Bulldogs	21–25	19–25	25–22	25–23	15–12	105–107	P2
2 Dec	14:00	NU Bulldogs	3–0	UST Tiger Spikers	25–23	25–23	25–21			75–67	P2

2022 V-League Collegiate Challenge Men's Champions
NU Bulldogs
1st title

== Women's tournament ==
=== Preliminary round ===
- All times are Philippine Standard Time (UTC+8:00).

==== Pool A ====
Pos	Team	Pld	W	L	Pts	SW	SL	SR	SPW	SPL	SPR	Qualification
1	Ateneo Blue Eagles	3	3	0	8	9	3	3.000	281	247	1.138	Quarterfinals
2	Adamson Lady Falcons	3	2	1	6	8	5	1.600	297	260	1.142	Quarterfinals
3	FEU Lady Tamaraws	3	1	2	4	6	7	0.857	279	273	1.022	Quarterfinals
4	San Sebastian Lady Stags	3	0	3	0	1	9	0.111	163	240	0.679	Quarterfinals

Date	Time		Score		Set 1	Set 2	Set 3	Set 4	Set 5	Total	Report
19 Oct	10:00	Ateneo Blue Eagles	3–0	San Sebastian Lady Stags	25–19	25–19	25–14			75–52	P2
19 Oct	15:00	Adamson Lady Falcons	3–2	FEU Lady Tamaraws	25–21	24–26	25–19	23–25	15–13	112–104	P2
26 Oct	13:00	San Sebastian Lady Stags	0–3	Adamson Lady Falcons	13–25	11–25	22–25			46–75	P2
26 Oct	17:00	FEU Lady Tamaraws	1–3	Ateneo Blue Eagles	20–25	25–21	21–25	19–25		85–96	P2
28 Oct	10:00	San Sebastian Lady Stags	1–3	FEU Lady Tamaraws	25–15	14–25	10–25	16–25		65–90	P2
28 Oct	15:00	Ateneo Blue Eagles	3–2	Adamson Lady Falcons	25–21	25–23	19–25	25–27	16–14	110–110	P2

==== Pool B ====
Pos	Team	Pld	W	L	Pts	SW	SL	SR	SPW	SPL	SPR	Qualification
1	Benilde Lady Blazers	3	3	0	9	9	1	9.000	245	185	1.324	Quarterfinals
2	UP Fighting Maroons	3	2	1	6	6	4	1.500	221	226	0.978	Quarterfinals
3	UST Golden Tigresses	3	1	2	3	5	6	0.833	261	245	1.065	Quarterfinals
4	San Beda Lady Red Spikers	3	0	3	0	0	9	0.000	157	225	0.698	Quarterfinals

Date	Time		Score		Set 1	Set 2	Set 3	Set 4	Set 5	Total	Report
19 Oct	13:00	Benilde Lady Blazers	3–1	UST Golden Tigresses	25–17	18–25	25–19	27–25		95–86	P2
19 Oct	17:00	UP Fighting Maroons	3–0	San Beda Lady Red Spikers	25–18	25–19	25–17			75–54	P2
26 Oct	10:00	San Beda Lady Red Spikers	0–3	Benilde Lady Blazers	18–25	18–25	19–25			55–75	P2
26 Oct	15:00	UST Golden Tigresses	1–3	UP Fighting Maroons	26–28	25–22	21–25	25–27		97–102	P2
28 Oct	13:00	San Beda Lady Red Spikers	0–3	UST Golden Tigresses	12–25	19–25	17–25			48–75	P2
28 Oct	17:00	UP Fighting Maroons	0–3	Benilde Lady Blazers	13–25	21–25	10–25			44–75	P2

=== Final round ===
- All times are Philippine Standard Time (UTC+8:00).

5th place match
November 25
FEU Lady Tamaraws	3
UST Golden Tigresses	2
7th place match
November 25
San Beda Lady Red Spikers	1
San Sebastian Lady Stags	3

5th–8th semifinals
November 18
San Beda Lady Red Spikers	0
FEU Lady Tamaraws	3
November 18
San Sebastian Lady Stags	0
UST Golden Tigresses	3

Quarterfinals
November 4
A1	Ateneo Blue Eagles	3
B4	San Beda Lady Red Spikers	1
November 4
A3	FEU Lady Tamaraws	1
B2	UP Fighting Maroons	3
November 9
A4	San Sebastian Lady Stags	0
B1	Benilde Lady Blazers	3
November 9
A2	Adamson Lady Falcons	3
B3	UST Golden Tigresses	0

Semifinals
November 20
Ateneo Blue Eagles	3
UP Fighting Maroons	0
November 20
Benilde Lady Blazers	1
Adamson Lady Falcons	3

Championship
November 27–30
Ateneo Blue Eagles	3	3
Adamson Lady Falcons	2	0
3rd place match
November 27
UP Fighting Maroons	0
Benilde Lady Blazers	3

==== Quarterfinals ====
Date	Time		Score		Set 1	Set 2	Set 3	Set 4	Set 5	Total	Report
4 Nov	15:00	FEU Lady Tamaraws	1–3	UP Fighting Maroons	25–20	19–25	22–25	17–25		83–95	P2
4 Nov	17:00	Ateneo Blue Eagles	3–1	San Beda Lady Red Spikers	25–13	20–25	25–18	25–22		95–78	P2
9 Nov	15:00	San Sebastian Lady Stags	0–3	Benilde Lady Blazers	15–25	20–25	17–25			52–75	P2
9 Nov	17:00	Adamson Lady Falcons	3–0	UST Golden Tigresses	25–15	25–15	25–22			75–52	P2

==== 5th–8th semifinals ====
Date	Time		Score		Set 1	Set 2	Set 3	Set 4	Set 5	Total	Report
18 Nov	10:00	San Beda Lady Red Spikers	0–3	FEU Lady Tamaraws	17–25	16–25	19–25			52–75	P2
18 Nov	13:00	San Sebastian Lady Stags	0–3	UST Golden Tigresses	20–25	15–25	15–25			50–75	P2

==== 7th place match ====
Date	Time		Score		Set 1	Set 2	Set 3	Set 4	Set 5	Total	Report
25 Nov	15:00	San Beda Lady Red Spikers	1–3	San Sebastian Lady Stags	14–25	19–25	25–18	18–25		76–93	P2

==== 5th place match ====
Date	Time		Score		Set 1	Set 2	Set 3	Set 4	Set 5	Total	Report
25 Nov	17:00	FEU Lady Tamaraws	3–2	UST Golden Tigresses	25–23	25–22	24–26	21–25	15–11	110–107	P2

==== Semifinals ====
Date	Time		Score		Set 1	Set 2	Set 3	Set 4	Set 5	Total	Report
20 Nov	13:00	Ateneo Blue Eagles	3–0	UP Fighting Maroons	25–21	25–21	25–20			75–62	P2
20 Nov	15:00	Benilde Lady Blazers	1–3	Adamson Lady Falcons	25–21	17–25	21–25	16–25		79–96	P2

==== 3rd place match ====
Date	Time		Score		Set 1	Set 2	Set 3	Set 4	Set 5	Total	Report
27 Nov	15:00	UP Fighting Maroons	0–3	Benilde Lady Blazers	20–25	17–25	16–25			53–75	P2

==== Championship ====
Date	Time		Score		Set 1	Set 2	Set 3	Set 4	Set 5	Total	Report
27 Nov	17:00	Ateneo Blue Eagles	3–2	Adamson Lady Falcons	20–25	25–21	25–22	24–26	18–16	112–110	P2
30 Nov	17:00	Adamson Lady Falcons	0–3	Ateneo Blue Eagles	12–25	22–25	12–25			46–75	P2

2022 V-League Collegiate Challenge Women's Champions
Ateneo Blue Eagles
1st title

== Awards and medalists ==
=== Individual awards ===
Award	Men's	Women's	Ref.
Conference & Finals'; Most Valuable Player	Angelo Nicolas Almendras	Faith Janine Shirley Nisperos	
Best Setter	Joshua Retamar	Louie Romero	
Best Outside Spikers	Angelo Nicolas Almendras; Mhicaelo Buddin	Faith Janine Shirley Nisperos; Vanessa Gandler	
Best Middle Blockers	Jettlee Gopio; Obed Mukaba	Zamantha Nolasco; Michelle Gamit	
Best Opposite Spiker	Kennedy Batas	Trisha Gayle Tubu	
Best Libero	John Philip Pepito	Roma Mae Doromal	

=== Medalists ===
Division	Gold	Silver	Bronze
Men's	NU Bulldogs RETAMAR, Ave Joshua (c); ALMENDRAS, Angelo Nicolas; BELOSTRINO, Clarenz; RAMONES, Kyle Adrien; BUDDIN, Michaelo; SUMAGUI, Jann Mariano; LUMANLAN, Louis; MUKABA, Obed; MALINIS, Kennry; MACLANG, Marco Ely; ARINGO, Leo JR; BELLO, Joseph Phillip; FORTUNA, Michael Jhon; DIAO, Jenngerard Arnfranz Head Coach: Dante Alinsunurin	UST Tiger Spikers CRUZ, Lorence (c); DE VEGA, Rey Miguel; BORRA, Lawrence; MAGPAYO, Charlee; TAMAN, Abdul Aziz; DEDOROY, John Emmanuel; YAMBAO, Dux Euan; SEÑORON, Jhun Lorenz; AVILA, Joshua; FLOR, Rainier; UMANDAL, Joshua; SISON, Rayven Camerone; YBAÑEZ, Josh; TAJANLANGIT, Jesse Emmanuel; UMANDAL, Sherwin; COLINARES, Edlyn Paul; PRUDENCIADO, Van Tracy; GUPITEO, Alche; KASSOUIN, Patrick; DELA NOCHE, Jay Rack Head Coach: Arthur Alan Mamon	Perpetual Altas RAMIREZ, Louie (c); TEODORO, Arianne Paul; MATEO, Klint Michael; ENGAY, Renz; ZARENO, Joshua; MEDALLA, Michael; ANDRADE, Kc; COLANGO, Emman; BAGGAYAN, Jay Rick; CODENIERA, Sean Archer Noel; RAMIREZ, Leo; ENARCISO, John Christian; LITUANIA, John Exequiel; GELOGO, Kylle Andre; SIMANGAN, Bryle; ROSOS, Kirth Patrick; PEPITO, John Philip; AUSTRIA, Hero Head Coach: Sinfronio Acaylar
Women's	Ateneo Blue Eagles NISPEROS, Faith Shirley (c); HORA, Gena; CANE, Jana; LICAUCO, Jean; GANDLER, Vanessa; KOWALSKI, Makana; CRUZ, Kiara; SULIT, Yvana; FUJIMOTO, Takako; TSUNASHIMA, Geezel; NARIT, Joan; MINER, Alexis; ILDEFONSO, Sofia; DE GUZMAN, Lyann; LOMOSCO, Beautiliza; DOROMAL, Roma Mae; NG, Briana; BUENA, Sophia; NISPEROS, Ysabelle Head Coach: Oliver Almadro	Adamson Lady Falcons ROMERO, Louie (c); LAZO, Cae Jelean; ALCANTARA, Angelica; NUIQUE, May Ann; ADOLFO, Antonette; SANTIAGO, Khate Nhorrylle; VERDEFLOR, Ma. Joahna Karen; CRUZ, Rizza Andrea; TUBU, Trisha Gayle; TAGSIP, Aprylle Ckyle; JUEGOS, Ayesha Tara; LALONGISIP, Ma. Rochelle; ALMONTE, Lucille May; TORING, Lorene Grace Head Coach: Jerry Yee	Benilde Lady Blazers GO, Mycah (c); BASARTE, Chenae; DIZON, Cathrina; GAMIT, Michelle; ESTENZO, Kim Alison; GETIGAN, Fiona Mae; MONDEJAR, Angelika; GENTAPA, Jade; MONDOÑEDO, Cloanne; PASCUAL, Gayle; AVILA, Camill; APOSTOL, Corrine; ESTOQUE, Wielyn; MAGPATOC, Abigail; CATARIG, Clydel Mae; DOROG, Jessa; ONDANGAN, Cristy; LIMPOT, Alyzandrianne; NOLASCO, Zamantha Head Coach: Jerry Yee

== Final standings ==
Rank	Men's	Women's
1st place, gold medalist(s)	NU Bulldogs	Ateneo Blue Eagles
2nd place, silver medalist(s)	UST Tiger Spikers	Adamson Lady Falcons
3rd place, bronze medalist(s)	Perpetual Altas	Benilde Lady Blazers
4	Ateneo Blue Eagles	UP Fighting Maroons
5	San Beda Red Spikers	FEU Lady Tamaraws
6	FEU Tamaraws	UST Golden Tigresses
7	De La Salle Green Spikers	San Sebastian Lady Stags
8	Arellano Chiefs	San Beda Lady Red Spikers
9	UP Fighting Maroons	
10	Adamson Soaring Falcons	
11	Benilde Blazers	
12	San Sebastian Stags	

== See also ==
- 2022 Shakey's Super League Collegiate Pre-Season Championship
