= NCAA Season 97 women's volleyball tournament =

NCAA Season 97
- Stronger Together. Buo ang Puso
- Host school: De La Salle–College of Saint Benilde (Season); Mapúa University (Tournament)
Women's Finals	G1	G2	Wins
Benilde Lady Blazers	3	3	2
Arellano Lady Chiefs	0	0	0
- Duration: July 20–22, 2022
- Arena(s): Filoil Flying V Arena
- Finals MVP: Jhasmin Gayle Pascual
- Winning coach: Jerry Yee
- Semifinalists: JRU Lady Bombers; San Sebastian Lady Stags
- TV network(s): GMA Network, GTV

The NCAA Season 97 women's volleyball tournament started on June 11, 2022 at Paco Arena in Paco, Manila, Philippines. Only the women's tournament was held due to the impact of the COVID-19 pandemic in the Philippines. The men's, boys' and girls' volleyball tournaments were not held this season due to the pandemic.

== Tournament format ==
The usual single round elimination will be followed:

1. Single round eliminations; top four teams advance to the stepladder
  - Slot 1: No. 3 vs No. 4 (knockout)
  - Slot 2: No. 2 vs Winner of No. 3 vs. No. 4 (knockout)
  - Slot 3: No. 1 vs Winner of No. 2 vs. No. 3
2. The finals is a best-of-three series.

Or the Semifinals, no sweep:

1. Single round eliminations; top four teams advance to the semifinals.
  If two teams are tied, there will be a playoffs.
  - No. 1 vs No. 4 (No. 1 is twice to beat)
  - No. 2 vs No. 3 (No. 2 is twice to beat)
2. The finals is a best-of-three series.

== Team line-up ==
Arellano Lady Chiefs
No.	Name	Position
1	Adante, Kristine Claire	S
2	Diño, Charmina	
3	Bello, Princess	
4	Manuntag, Janice	
5	Cuenca, Cherry Mae	L
7	Daisog, Alliah Grace	L
8	San Gregorio, Alyana Marie	
9	Sasuman, Nicole Victoria	
10	Paralejas, Donnalyn Mae	S
11	Batindaan, Dodee Risa Joy	
13	Abay, Trina Marice	
14	De Guzman, Pauline	
15	Donato, Carla Amaina (c)	MB
19	Matawaran, Robbie Mae	
	Padillon, Marianne Lei Angelique (r)	
	Pecaña, Lorraine (r)	
	Roberto Javier	HC

Letran Lady Knights
No.	Name	Position
2	Castro, Julienne Rose	
5	Dela Cruz, Kathleen	
3	Dela Cruz, Royce	
6	Ledesma, Angelique	
7	Cunada, Chamberlaine	
8	Musngi, Edma Anne	S
9	Urmeneta, Shereena (c)	
10	Estreller, Natalie Marie	
11	Santos, Alyssa Jeremay	
12	Calixto, Cristine Kate	
16	Isar, Lastlie Jade	
17	Tapang, Lea Rizel	L
18	Melendres, Daisy	MB
19	Silva, Lara Mae	L
	Afgao, Angel (r)	
	Marcos, Clarence (r)	
	Michael Inoferio	HC

Benilde Lady Blazers
No.	Name	Position
1	Basarte, Chenae	
2	Dizon, Cathrina	
3	Gamit, Michelle	MB
4	Estenzo, Kim Alison	L
5	Salmon, Queen Ann	
6	Mondejar, Angelika	L
7	Gentapa, Jade	
8	Mondoñedo, Cloanne Sophia	S
9	Pascual, Jhasmin Gayle	
10	Go, Francis Mycah (c)	OH
11	Avila, Ma. Camill	
12	Apostol, Corrine	
18	Ondangan, Cristy	
	Jerry Yee	HC

EAC Lady Generals
No.	Name	Position
1	Mangaring, Jayrah	L
2	Omapas, Jennifer	
3	Magalona, Rhea	
4	Bañares, Monna Sherina	
5	Villena, Jamaica	
6	Perez, Lyka Janelle	
7	Reyes, Krizzia	
8	Cabrera, Jan Carl Lauren (c)	OH
9	Salvaloza, Alex Cyra	L
10	Porto, Jeanne Kirstine	
12	Formento, Anne Jelyn	S
13	Almazan, Cathrine	
16	Lut, Georgeena	
17	Ginampos, Jonalyn	
	Rodrigo Palmero	HC

JRU Lady Bombers
No.	Name	Position
1	Bautista, Angel Rose	
2	Amante, Mailey	
3	Melgar, Renesa	
4	Egera, Jonazel Lyka	
5	Alona, Marianne	L
6	Ortiz, Reizabelle	L
7	Niegos, Sydney Mae	MB
8	Rose, Riza	
9	Ruiz, Mary May	
10	Laurente, Jerry Lyn	S
11	Villanueva, Danica	
14	Verzosa, Dolly Grace (c)	OH
	Mia Tioseco	HC

Lyceum Lady Pirates
No.	Name	Position
2	Jacinto, Patricia May	
3	Tulang, Janeth	
4	Sta. Maria, Lois	
6	Maligmat, MM Jewel Therese	
8	Toca, Francheska Veron	L
9	Topacio, Lean Isabelle	
10	Puzon, Venice (c)	S
11	Belaro, Camille	L
13	Perez, Ritanhelle	
14	Daya, Micah Niña	
15	Dolorito, Johna Denise	
16	Dahab, Zonxi Jane	MB
17	Baroro, Alyssa Reigne	
18	Mañacap, Maricar	
	Doguna, Joan (r)	
	Galeno, Carol Joy (r)	
	Cromwel Garcia	HC

Mapúa Lady Cardinals
No.	Name	Position
2	Fernandez, Jonina Mae (c)	OH
3	Manalo, Therese Angeli	
4	Batac, Chenie	
6	Bolandrina, Leslie	
7	Babiera, Jolina Princess	
8	Ortega, Wellamae	L
9	Gojol, Trixie Mae	S
10	Espiritu, Ayena Gwen	S
11	Ong, Alyanna Nicole	MB
12	Sy, Janina Dimples	L
13	Vergino, Raina Airyl	
14	Gaudan, Carla Jean	
15	Cruz, Allyana Louise	
19	Dalida, Sunshine	
	Cabadin, Gregchelle Grace (r)	
	Obeñita, Kate Michelle (r)	
	Clarence Esteban	HC

San Beda Red Lionesses
No.	Name	Position
1	Gregorio, Miles	L
2	Domingo, Ma. Aira	
3	Ani, Hermione Mikaela	
5	Espinosa, Jeaniella Mae	
6	Mañalac, Patricia Mae	
7	Salangsang, Francesca Louise	
8	Buno, Justin Marie	L
9	Cenzon, Patricia Ysabel	S
10	Galang, Mikaella	
11	Lapid, Justine (c)	OH
13	Paras, Trisha Mae	MB
14	Tayag, Maxinne Joyce	
15	Tayag, Marianne Louise	
	Toledo, Sheena (r)	
	Nemesio Gavino	HC

San Sebastian Lady Stags
No.	Name	Position
1	Santos, Katherine	
2	Cañete, Reyann	
3	Bermillo, Jewelle (c)	L
4	Marasigan, Christina	
6	Tan, Roxanne	L
7	Requierme, Shane	
8	Dionisio, Kristine Joy	MB
9	Sison, Alexia Vea	S
10	Tan, Kamille Josephine Amaka	
11	Ultu, Angela Nicole	
13	Carreon, Jamille Veronica	
14	Ordoña, Bianca	
16	San Juan, Alyssa Joy	
	Guibao, Jamie Annika (r)	
	Roger Gorayeb	HC

Perpetual Lady Altas
No.	Name	Position
1	Dapol, Mary Rhose	
2	Lim, Catherine	L
3	Bedaña, Winnie	
4	Salimbacod, Daisy	
5	Reyes, Pauline Mae	L
6	Padua, Janine	
7	Reyes, Kaila Edilsam	
8	Santiago, Karla Jane	
9	Ocado, Charmaine	
11	Arcellana, Kathrina	
14	Suico, Hannah Marie Pauline	
15	Aldea, Razel Paula	MB
16	Scott, Charina (c)	MB
17	Gaviola, Jenny	S
	Andal, Marian Tracy (r)	
	Cordero, Krisha (r)	
	Sandy Rieta	HC

Source: GMA Network-NCAA Season 97 women's volleyball lineup

Legend
S	Setter
MB	Middle Blocker
OH	Outside Hitter
OP	Opposite Hitter
L	Libero
(c)	Team Captain
(r)	Team Reserve(s)
HC	Head coach

== Elimination round ==
=== Team standings ===
Pos	Team	Pld	W	L	Pts	SW	SL	SR	SPW	SPL	SPR	
1	Benilde Lady Blazers	9	9	0	27	27	1	27.000	692	411	1.684	Advance to the finals (Note: As Benilde won all of their elimination round games, the stepladder format will be used instead of the regular Final Four format.)
2	Arellano Lady Chiefs	9	7	2	21	21	10	2.100	730	630	1.159	Proceed to stepladder round 2
3	San Sebastian Lady Stags	9	6	3	17	22	15	1.467	860	742	1.159	Proceed to stepladder round 1
4	JRU Lady Bombers	9	5	4	15	18	16	1.125	708	734	0.965	Proceed to stepladder round 1
5	Mapúa Lady Cardinals (H)	9	5	4	11	16	20	0.800	709	769	0.922	
6	Lyceum Lady Pirates	9	4	5	13	18	19	0.947	789	807	0.978	
7	Perpetual Lady Altas	8	2	6	8	11	18	0.611	630	698	0.903	
8	San Beda Red Lionesses	8	2	6	8	12	20	0.600	656	761	0.862	
9	EAC Lady Generals	9	2	7	7	9	23	0.391	638	747	0.854	
10	Letran Lady Knights	9	2	7	5	11	23	0.478	692	775	0.893	

Source: GMA Network-NCAA
Rules for classification: 1) Number of wins; 2) match points; 3) sets ratio; 4) points ratio; 5) head-to-head record
(H) Host
Notes:

Point system:

3 points = win match in 3 or 4 sets
2 points = win match in 5 sets
1 point = lose match in 5 sets
0 point = lose match in 3 or 4 sets

=== Match-up results ===
Team ╲ Game	1	2	3	4	5	6	7	8	9
Arellano	Mapua school colors	San Beda school colors	SSC-R school colors	Lyceum school colors	JRU school colors	Letran school colors	UPHD school colors	EAC school colors	CSB school colors
Letran	JRU school colors	UPHD school colors	CSB school colors	San Beda school colors	Lyceum school colors	Arellano school colors	EAC school colors	Mapua school colors	SSC-R school colors
Benilde	San Beda school colors	Lyceum school colors	Letran school colors	EAC school colors	Mapua school colors	SSC-R school colors	JRU school colors	UPHD school colors	Arellano school colors
EAC	SSC-R school colors	JRU school colors	UPHD school colors	CSB school colors	San Beda school colors	Lyceum school colors	Letran school colors	Arellano school colors	Mapua school colors
JRU	Letran school colors	EAC school colors	Mapua school colors	SSC-R school colors	Arellano school colors	UPHD school colors	CSB school colors	San Beda school colors	Lyceum school colors
Lyceum	UPHD school colors	CSB school colors	San Beda school colors	Arellano school colors	Letran school colors	EAC school colors	Mapua school colors	SSC-R school colors	JRU school colors
Mapúa	Arellano school colors	SSC-R school colors	JRU school colors	UPHD school colors	CSB school colors	San Beda school colors	Lyceum school colors	Letran school colors	EAC school colors
San Beda	CSB school colors	Arellano school colors	Lyceum school colors	Letran school colors	EAC school colors	Mapua school colors	SSC-R school colors	JRU school colors	UPHD school colors
San Sebastian	EAC school colors	Mapua school colors	Arellano school colors	JRU school colors	UPHD school colors	CSB school colors	San Beda school colors	Lyceum school colors	Letran school colors
Perpetual	Lyceum school colors	Letran school colors	EAC school colors	Mapua school colors	SSC-R school colors	JRU school colors	Arellano school colors	CSB school colors	San Beda school colors

Updated to match(es) played on July 12, 2022. Source: GMA Network-NCAA
= Win; = Loss; = Match no longer held, was ruled as a no contest

=== Scores ===
Teams	AU	CSJL	CSB	EAC	JRU	LPU	MU	SBU	SSC-R	UPHSD
Arellano Lady Chiefs	—	3–1	0–3	3–0	3–1	3–1	3–0	3–1	0–3	3–0
Letran Lady Knights	—	—	1–3	1–3	1–3	1–3	3–0	3–2	0–3	0–3
Benilde Lady Blazers	—	—	—	3–0	3–0	3–0	3–0	3–0	3–0	3–0
EAC Lady Generals	—	—	—	—	0–3	3–1	2–3	1–3	0–3	0–3
JRU Lady Bombers	—	—	—	—	—	3–2	0–3	3–0	2–3	3–1
Lyceum Lady Pirates	—	—	—	—	—	—	2–3	3–1	3–2	3–0
Mapúa Lady Cardinals	—	—	—	—	—	—	—	1–3	3–2	3–2
San Beda Red Lionesses	—	—	—	—	—	—	—	—	2–3	n/c
San Sebastian Lady Stags	—	—	—	—	—	—	—	—	—	3–2
Perpetual Lady Altas	—	—	—	—	—	—	—	—	—	—

Updated to match(es) played on July 12, 2022. Source: GMA Network-NCAA
Legend: Blue = left column team win; Red = top row team win.

== Bracket ==
First round
3	San Sebastian	2
4	JRU	3

Second round
2	Arellano	3
4	JRU	1

Final
1	Benilde	3	3
2	Arellano	0	0

== Stepladder semifinals ==
=== First round ===
This is a one-game playoff.

July 15, 2022; 2:00 PM (UTC+8:00)	San Sebastian Lady Stags	2–3	JRU Lady Bombers	Filoil Flying V Arena, San Juan City; Attendance: 250; Referees: Bob Malenab (NR) and Emmanuel Yadao (NR)
July 15, 2022; 2:00 PM (UTC+8:00)	(21–25, 25–18, 25–22, 20–25, 9–15)			Filoil Flying V Arena, San Juan City; Attendance: 250; Referees: Bob Malenab (NR) and Emmanuel Yadao (NR)

=== Second round ===
This is a one-game playoff.

July 17, 2022; 2:00 PM (UTC+8:00)	Arellano Lady Chiefs	3–1	JRU Lady Bombers	Filoil Flying V Arena, San Juan City; Attendance: 250; Referees: Emmanuel Yadao (NR) and Rolando Casillan (NR)
July 17, 2022; 2:00 PM (UTC+8:00)	(19–25, 25–20, 27–25, 25–17)			Filoil Flying V Arena, San Juan City; Attendance: 250; Referees: Emmanuel Yadao (NR) and Rolando Casillan (NR)

== Finals ==
Benilde will a have best-of-three finals series against the semifinals winner.

July 20, 2022; 2:00 PM (UTC+8:00)	Benilde Lady Blazers	3–0	Arellano Lady Chiefs	Filoil Flying V Arena, San Juan City; Attendance: 250; Referees: Ely de Jesus (NR) and Rolly Casillan (NR)
July 20, 2022; 2:00 PM (UTC+8:00)	(25–21, 25–11, 25–10)			Filoil Flying V Arena, San Juan City; Attendance: 250; Referees: Ely de Jesus (NR) and Rolly Casillan (NR)

July 22, 2022; 2:00 PM (UTC+8:00)	Benilde Lady Blazers	3–0	Arellano Lady Chiefs	Filoil Flying V Arena, San Juan City; Attendance: 750; Referees: Ernesto Cabusa (NR) and Emmanuel Yadao (NR)
July 22, 2022; 2:00 PM (UTC+8:00)	(26–24, 25–12, 25–9)			Filoil Flying V Arena, San Juan City; Attendance: 750; Referees: Ernesto Cabusa (NR) and Emmanuel Yadao (NR)
July 22, 2022; 2:00 PM (UTC+8:00)	Benilde wins series, 2–0			Filoil Flying V Arena, San Juan City; Attendance: 750; Referees: Ernesto Cabusa (NR) and Emmanuel Yadao (NR)

- Finals Most Valuable Player: Jhasmin Gayle Pascual (Benilde Lady Blazers)

== Awards ==
- Most valuable player: Francis Mycah Go (Benilde Lady Blazers)
- Rookie of the Year: Katherine Santos (San Sebastian Lady Stags)
- 1st Best Outside Spiker: Francis Mycah Go (Benilde Lady Blazers)
- 2nd Best Outside Spiker: Dolly Grace Versoza (JRU Lady Bombers)
- 1st Best Middle Blocker: Zonxi Dahab (Lyceum Lady Pirates)
- 2nd Best Middle Blocker: Alyanna Nicole Ong (Mapúa Lady Cardinals)
- Best opposite spiker: Reyann Canete (San Sebastian Lady Stags)
- Best setter: Venice Puzon (Lyceum Lady Pirates)
- Best libero: Alex Cyra Salvaloza (EAC Lady Generals)
- Coach of the Year: Jerry Yee (Benilde Lady Blazers)

== Media ==
The women's volleyball tournament started on June 11, 2022, with matches airing on GTV.

Play-by-play commentator

- Anton Roxas
- Martin Javier
- Andrei Felix
- Mikee Reyes
- Martin Antonio
- Sophia Senoron

Color commentator

- Cesca Racraquin
- John Vic De Guzman
- Kara Acevedo-Ong
- Gyra Barroga
- Jayvee Sumagaysay
- Anjo Pertierra
- Michele Gumabao
- Grethcel Soltones
- Shola Alvarez
- Martin Antonio

Courtside reporter

- Baileys Acot
- Chase Orozco
- Chloe Carillo
- Aya De Quiroz
- Christian Dimaunahan
- Sofia Rodels
- Ann Gabriel
- Lance Santiago
- Eden Hernandez
- Christian Sebastian
- Chantal Laude
- Avia Zunic
- Michelle Naldo

== See also ==
- UAAP Season 84 women's volleyball tournament

Preceded by Season 95 (2020)	NCAA volleyball tournaments Season 97 (2022)	Succeeded by Season 98 (2023)
