= 2025–26 Zus Coffee Thunderbelles season =

Second season of the Zus Coffee Thunderbelles

The 2025–26 Zus Coffee Thunderbelles season was the second season of the Zus Coffee Thunderbelles in the Premier Volleyball League (PVL).

Ahead of the preseason PVL on Tour, Zus Coffee brought in Alyssa Eroa from the Galeries Tower Highrisers and Maika Ortiz from the Choco Mucho Flying Titans to their roster. In the prelims, Zus Coffee finish with a 3–2 record, but with all of their wins being in five sets, they only accrued seven points, finishing fourth. In the knockout round, the team beat Choco Mucho in a five-set match which led them to the final round, where they were swept by PLDT in the quarterfinals.

Despite not making the semifinals, Zus Coffee was invited to take part in the Invitational Conference following guest team Kurashiki Ablaze's inability to take part. The team lost all five matches in the prelims without earning any points.

For the Reinforced Conference, the team will bring in American player Anna DeBeer to be their foreign guest player for the conference. The team had their best finish in the prelims after placing second with a 7–1 record, racking up 20 points along the way. They then swept Capital1 in the quarterfinals to clinch their first-ever semifinals berth.

Before the All-Filipino Conference, the Thunderbelles reinforced their youth-led roster with Cess Robles while also acquiring veterans Rachel Daquis and Chie Saet.

== Roster ==
Zus Coffee Thunderbelles roster
No.	Nat.	Player	Pos.	Height	DOB	From
1	(Philippines)	Mycah Go	Outside Hitter	1.70 m (5 ft 7 in)	April 15, 2002 (age 24)	St. Benilde
2	(Philippines)	Caroline Santos	Middle Blocker	1.76 m (5 ft 9 in)	November 24, 2001 (age 24)	De La Salle
3	(Philippines)	Thea Gagate	Middle Blocker	1.88 m (6 ft 2 in)	July 6, 2000 (age 26)	De La Salle
4	(Philippines)	Kate Santiago	Outside Hitter	1.70 m (5 ft 7 in)	January 26, 2002 (age 24)	Adamson
5	(Philippines)	Glaudine Troncoso	Outside Hitter	1.77 m (5 ft 10 in)	October 13, 1997 (age 28)	Central Philippine
7	(Philippines)	Jade Gentapa	Outside Hitter	1.72 m (5 ft 8 in)	November 28, 2000 (age 25)	St. Benilde
8	(Philippines)	Jovelyn Gonzaga	Opposite Hitter	1.73 m (5 ft 8 in)	October 31, 1991 (age 34)	Central Philippine
10	(Philippines)	Chinnie Arroyo	Outside Hitter	1.72 m (5 ft 8 in)	May 19, 2001 (age 25)	National-U
11	(Philippines)	Wielyn Estoque	Outside Hitter	1.72 m (5 ft 8 in)	April 8, 2001 (age 25)	St. Benilde
12	(Philippines)	Renee Mabilangan	Setter	1.66 m (5 ft 5 in)	December 29, 2000 (age 25)	National-U
13	(Philippines)	Rachel Daquis	Outside Hitter	1.77 m (5 ft 10 in)	December 13, 1987 (age 38)	Far Eastern
14	(Philippines)	Renee Peñafiel	Outside Hitter	1.64 m (5 ft 5 in)	July 26, 2002 (age 23)	UST
15	(Philippines)	AC Miner	Middle Blocker	1.80 m (5 ft 11 in)	January 21, 2003 (age 23)	Ateneo
16	(Philippines)	Alyssa Eroa	Libero	1.50 m (4 ft 11 in)	September 6, 1996 (age 29)	San Sebastian
17	(Philippines)	Fiola Ceballos	Outside Hitter	1.70 m (5 ft 7 in)	June 21, 1994 (age 32)	Central Philippine
18	(Philippines)	Chie Saet	Setter	1.64 m (5 ft 5 in)	November 24, 1984 (age 41)	De La Salle
19	(Philippines)	Riza Nogales	Middle Blocker	1.63 m (5 ft 4 in)	December 3, 2002 (age 23)	UE
21	(Philippines)	Cloanne Mondoñedo (C)	Setter	1.68 m (5 ft 6 in)	November 16, 2000 (age 25)	St. Benilde
23	(Philippines)	Cess Robles	Outside Hitter	1.60 m (5 ft 3 in)	June 7, 1997 (age 29)	National-U
24	(Philippines)	Maika Ortiz	Middle Blocker	1.78 m (5 ft 10 in)	August 30, 1991 (age 34)	UST
25	(Philippines)	Karen Verdeflor	Libero	1.55 m (5 ft 1 in)	September 24, 2000 (age 25)	Adamson

Coaching staff

- Head coach:
  (Philippines) Jerry Yee
- Assistant coaches:
  (Philippines) Rogelio Getigan
  (Philippines) Justine Dorog
  (Philippines) Mark Santos
- Strength & conditioning coach:
  (Philippines) Paul Ericta & Jimbo Arceo

Team staff

- Team manager:
  (Philippines) Jacob Lao

Medical staff

- Physiotherapist:
  (Philippines) Juana Roxas

=== National team players ===
Players who are part of the Philippines women's national team are excluded from playing with the team due to various commitments. This affected the team's roster for both the PVL on Tour and Invitational Conference.

- Thea Gagate

== Draft ==
Round	Pick	Player	Pos.	School
1	5	AC Miner	MB	Ateneo
2	17	Mycah Go	OH	Benilde
3	25	Riza Nogales	MB	UE
4	28	Angela Jackson	OH	UST

== PVL on Tour ==
=== Preliminary round ===
==== Pool B standings ====
Pos	Team	Pld	W	L	Pts	SW	SL	SR	SPW	SPL	SPR	Qualification
2	Creamline Cool Smashers	5	3	2	10	11	8	1.375	441	394	1.119	Final round
3	Chery Tiggo Crossovers	5	3	2	9	12	10	1.200	488	451	1.082	Knockout round
4	Zus Coffee Thunderbelles	5	3	2	7	12	12	1.000	512	503	1.018	Knockout round
5	Akari Chargers	5	2	3	6	9	11	0.818	420	460	0.913	Knockout round
6	Capital1 Solar Spikers	5	0	5	1	3	15	0.200	353	432	0.817	Knockout round

Source: PVL.ph

==== Match log ====
2025 PVL on Tour preliminary round match log
Total: 3–2 (7 points)
July: 3–2 (7 points)

Match	Date	Opponent	Sets	Total	Location Attendance	Record	Pts	Report
1	July 5, 2025	Akari	2–3	110–102	Ynares Center Montalban; 1,393	0–1	1	P2
2	July 6, 2025	Capital1	3–2	109–103	Ynares Center Montalban; 1,203	1–1	3	P2
3	July 19, 2025	Creamline	3–2	111–105	City of Passi Arena; 2,174	2–1	5	P2
4	July 20, 2025	Cignal	1–3	80–96	City of Passi Arena; 2,405	2–2	5	P2
5	July 29, 2025	Chery Tiggo	3–2	102–97	Candon City Arena; 2,929	3–2	7	P2

=== Knockout round ===
==== Match log ====
2025 PVL on Tour knockout round match log
Total: 1–0 (2 points)
Knockout round: 1–0 (2 points)

Date	Opponent	Sets	Total	Location Attendance	Report
August 5, 2025	Choco Mucho	3–2	107–93	PhilSports Arena; 1,243	P2

=== Final round ===
==== Bracket ====
Quarterfinals
August 7
1 PLDT	3
8 Zus Coffee	0
August 9
4 Creamline	3
5 Farm Fresh	0
August 7
2 Cignal	3
7 Akari	0
August 9
3 Nxled	0
6 Chery Tiggo	3

Semifinals
August 12
PLDT	3
Creamline	2
August 12
Cignal	1
Chery Tiggo	3

Championship
August 17
PLDT	3
Chery Tiggo	2
3rd place match
August 17
Creamline	3
Cignal	0

==== Match log ====
2025 PVL on Tour final round match log
Total: 0–1 (0 points)
Quarterfinals: 0–1 (0 points)

Date	Opponent	Sets	Total	Location Attendance	Report
August 7, 2025	PLDT	0–3	61–75	PhilSports Arena; 1,135	P2

== Invitational Conference ==
=== Preliminary round ===
==== Standings ====
Pos	Team	Pld	W	L	Pts	SW	SL	SR	SPW	SPL	SPR	Qualification
2	Kobe Shinwa University	5	4	1	11	12	7	1.714	442	402	1.100	Championship match
3	Chery Tiggo Crossovers	5	3	2	9	11	9	1.222	430	425	1.012	3rd place match
4	Creamline Cool Smashers	5	2	3	7	11	11	1.000	482	460	1.048	3rd place match
5	Cignal HD Spikers	5	1	4	4	7	13	0.538	398	433	0.919	
6	Zus Coffee Thunderbelles	5	0	5	0	2	15	0.133	303	423	0.716	

Source: Premier Volleyball League

==== Match log ====
2025 PVL Invitational Conference preliminary round match log
Total: 0–5 (0 points)
August: 0–5 (0 points)

Match	Date	Opponent	Sets	Total	Location Attendance	Record	Pts	Report
1	August 23, 2025	Kobe Shinwa	0–3	56–77	PhilSports Arena; 850	0–1	0	P2
2	August 25, 2025	Cignal	1–3	81–97	PhilSports Arena; 485	0–2	0	P2
3	August 26, 2025	Chery Tiggo	0–3	57–75	PhilSports Arena; 968	0–3	0	P2
4	August 28, 2025	PLDT	1–3	74–99	PhilSports Arena; 352	0–4	0	P2
5	August 29, 2025	Creamline	0–3	54–75	Smart Araneta Coliseum; 810	0–5	0	P2

== Reinforced Conference ==
=== Preliminary round ===
==== Standings ====
Pos	Team	Pld	W	L	Pts	SW	SL	SR	SPW	SPL	SPR	Qualification
1	Farm Fresh Foxies	8	7	1	21	22	7	3.143	694	618	1.123	Quarterfinals
2	Zus Coffee Thunderbelles	8	7	1	20	21	8	2.625	688	596	1.154	Quarterfinals
3	PLDT High Speed Hitters	8	6	2	18	19	9	2.111	669	591	1.132	Quarterfinals
4	Creamline Cool Smashers	8	5	3	17	20	12	1.667	729	661	1.103	Quarterfinals
5	Petro Gazz Angels	8	5	3	14	17	14	1.214	718	669	1.073	Quarterfinals

Source: Premier Volleyball League

==== Match log ====
2025 PVL Reinforced Conference preliminary round match log
Total: 7–1 (20 points)
First round: 5–0 (14 points)

Match	Date	Opponent	Sets	Total	Location Attendance	Record	Pts	Report
1 (Note: The result of Zus Coffee's game against Akari in the PVL Reinforced Conference preliminary round was nullified as the game will be replayed with foreign guest players on November 4.)	October 7, 2025	Akari	3–2	107–105	Ynares Center Montalban; 1,533	—	—	P2
2	October 11, 2025	Chery Tiggo	3–1	95–83	City of Dasmariñas Arena; 3,266	1–0	3	P2
3	October 14, 2025	Galeries Tower	3–0	75–54	Smart Araneta Coliseum; 1,510	2–0	6	P2
4	October 23, 2025	Creamline	3–1	100–86	Filoil Centre; 1,850	3–0	9	P2
5	October 28, 2025	Petro Gazz	3–0	75–63	Filoil Centre; 1,200	4–0	12	P2
6	November 4, 2025	Akari	3–2	110–92	SM Mall of Asia Arena; 1,178	5–0	14	P2

Second round: 2–1 (6 points)

Match	Date	Opponent	Sets	Total	Location Attendance	Record	Pts	Report
7	November 8, 2025	Choco Mucho	3–1	99–87	Candon City Arena; 2,561	6–0	17	P2
8	November 13, 2025	Cignal	0–3	59–76	Smart Araneta Coliseum; 1,551	6–1	17	P2
9	November 18, 2025	Nxled	3–0	75–55	Ynares Center Montalban; 736	7–1	20	P2

=== Final round ===
==== Bracket ====
Quarterfinals
November 24
Farm Fresh	0
Akari	3
November 24
Creamline	1
Petro Gazz	3
November 24
Zus Coffee	3
Capital1	0
November 24
PLDT	3
Cignal	1

Semifinals
November 27
Akari	2
Petro Gazz	3
November 27
Zus Coffee	3
PLDT	0

Championship
November 30
Petro Gazz	3
Zus Coffee	1
3rd-place match
November 30
Akari	3
PLDT	2

==== Match log ====
2025 PVL Reinforced Conference final round match log
Total: 2–1 (6 points)
Quarterfinals: 1–0 (3 points)

Date	Opponent	Sets	Total	Location Attendance	Report
November 24, 2025	Capital1	3–0	75–52	Smart Araneta Coliseum	P2

Semifinals: 1–0 (3 points)

Date	Opponent	Sets	Total	Location Attendance	Report
November 27, 2025	PLDT	3–0	78–70	Smart Araneta Coliseum	P2

Championship: 0–1 (0 points)

Date	Opponent	Sets	Total	Location Attendance	Report
November 30, 2025	Petro Gazz	1–3	94–99	Smart Araneta Coliseum	P2

== All-Filipino Conference ==
=== Preliminary round ===
==== Standings ====
Pos	Team	Pld	W	L	Pts	SW	SL	SR	SPW	SPL	SPR	Qualification
6	Akari Chargers	9	5	4	15	19	18	1.056	792	838	0.945	Play-in tournament semifinals
7	Choco Mucho Flying Titans	9	4	5	13	19	19	1.000	828	826	1.002	Play-in tournament quarterfinals
8	Capital1 Solar Spikers	9	4	5	10	14	21	0.667	748	796	0.940	Play-in tournament quarterfinals
9	Galeries Tower Highrisers	9	2	7	6	11	24	0.458	707	800	0.884	Play-in tournament quarterfinals
10	Zus Coffee Thunderbelles	9	1	8	3	9	26	0.346	693	819	0.846	Play-in tournament quarterfinals

Source: Premier Volleyball League

==== Match log ====
2026 PVL All-Filipino Conference preliminary round match log
Total: 1–8 (3 points)
February: 1–5 (3 points)

Match	Date	Opponent	Sets	Total	Location Attendance	Record	Pts	Report
1	February 3, 2026	Capital1	1–3	77–90	Filoil Centre; 848	0–1	0	P2
2	February 7, 2026	Galeries Tower	2–3	102–110	Ynares Center Montalban; 394	0–2	1	P2
3	February 12, 2026	Akari	3–2	99–103	Filoil Centre; 740	1–2	3	P2
4	February 17, 2026	Creamline	1–3	76–97	Filoil Centre; 4,569	1–3	3	P2
5	February 21, 2026	Farm Fresh	0–3	50–75	Filoil Centre; 3,570	1–4	3	P2
6	February 28, 2026	PLDT	0–3	59–75	Filoil Centre; 1,056	1–5	3	P2

March: 0–3 (0 points)

Match	Date	Opponent	Sets	Total	Location Attendance	Record	Pts	Report
7	March 5, 2026	Cignal	0–3	63–75	Filoil Centre; 314	0–1	3	P2
8	March 12, 2026	Nxled	1–3	82–95	Filoil Centre; 1,444	0–2	3	P2
9	March 19, 2026	Choco Mucho	1–3	85–99	Filoil Centre; 984	0–3	3	P2

=== Play-in tournament ===
==== Pool B ====
Play-in pool B quarterfinal
7	Choco Mucho	3
10	Zus Coffee	2

Play-in pool B semifinal
6	Akari	3
7	Choco Mucho	2

Play-in pool B final
3	Creamline	3
6	Akari	1

==== Match log ====
2026 PVL All-Filipino Conference play-in tournament match log
Total: 0–1 (1 points)
Play-in tournament: 0–1 (1 points)

Date	Opponent	Sets	Total	Location Attendance	Report
March 24, 2026	Choco Mucho	2–3	94–99	Filoil Centre; 932	P2

== Transactions ==
=== Additions ===
Player	Date signed	Previous team	Ref.
Alyssa Eroa	May 26, 2025	Galeries Tower Highrisers	
Fiola Ceballos	May 27, 2025	PLDT High Speed Hitters	
Renee Mabilangan	May 28, 2025	Galeries Tower Highrisers	
Maika Ortiz	May 29, 2025	Choco Mucho Flying Titans	
AC Miner	June 12, 2025	Ateneo Blue Eagles (UAAP)	
Mycah Go	June 12, 2025	Benilde Lady Blazers (NCAA)	
Riza Nogales	June 12, 2025	UE Lady Red Warriors (UAAP)	
Renee Penafiel	December 3, 2025 (Note: The player was initially signed to the Strong Group Athletics organization before being assigned to Farm Fresh on January 26, 2026.)	Chery Tiggo EV Crossovers	
Cess Robles	December 3, 2025	Chery Tiggo EV Crossovers	
Karen Verdeflor	December 3, 2025	Chery Tiggo EV Crossovers	
Chie Saet	January 4, 2026	Petro Gazz Angels	
Rachel Daquis	January 26, 2026	Farm Fresh Foxies	

=== Subtractions ===
Player	New team	Ref.
Shar Ancheta	Galeries Tower Highrisers	
Julia Angeles	Galeries Tower Highrisers	
Jaycel Delos Reyes	Nxled Chameleons	
Michelle Gamit	Creamline Cool Smashers	
Gayle Pascual	Galeries Tower Highrisers	
Ypril Tapia	Capital1 Solar Spikers	
Dolly Versoza	Galeries Tower Highrisers	
Nikka Yandoc	Capital1 Solar Spikers	

=== Foreign guest player ===
Team	Foreign player	Moving from	Ref.
Zus Coffee Thunderbelles	(United States) Anna DeBeer	(United States) Indy Ignite	
