= 2026–27 Zus Coffee Thunderbelles season =

Filipino women's volleyball team season

The 2026–27 Zus Coffee Thunderbelles season will be the third season of the Zus Coffee Thunderbelles in the Premier Volleyball League (PVL).

In the PVL on Tour. Zus Coffee Thunderbelles started their PVL on Tour Showdown campaign on July 8, 2026 with a four-set victory over the Akari Chargers in Ilagan, Isabela. The Thunderbelles notched their second win of the On Tour series with a straight-set triumph over Choco Mucho Flying Titans on July 11, 2026 in Batangas City, Batangas. On August 7, 2026, Zus Coffee match with the PLDT High Speed Hitters to be played in Santiago, Isabela on August 8, was postponed by the PVL due to Tropical Depression Maymay. Zus Coffee ends their preseason caravan with a 2–0 record, completing a perfect preseason run despite playing one fewer match than originally scheduled.

== Roster ==
Zus Coffee Thunderbelles roster
No.	Nat.	Player	Pos.	Height	DOB	From
1	(Philippines)	Mycah Go	Libero	1.70 m (5 ft 7 in)	April 15, 2002 (age 24)	St. Benilde
2	(Philippines)	Chenae Basarte	Setter	1.70 m (5 ft 7 in)	December 9, 2001 (age 24)	St. Benilde
3	(Philippines)	Rachel Daquis	Outside Hitter	1.77 m (5 ft 10 in)	December 13, 1987 (age 38)	Far Eastern
5	(Philippines)	Glaudine Troncoso	Opposite Hitter	1.77 m (5 ft 10 in)	October 13, 1997 (age 29)	Central Philippine
7	(Philippines)	Cess Robles	Outside Hitter	1.60 m (5 ft 3 in)	June 7, 1997 (age 29)	National-U
8	(Philippines)	Jovelyn Gonzaga	Opposite Hitter	1.73 m (5 ft 8 in)	October 31, 1991 (age 35)	Central Philippine
9	(Philippines)	Kate Santiago	Outside Hitter	1.70 m (5 ft 7 in)	January 26, 2002 (age 24)	Adamson
10	(Philippines)	Chinnie Arroyo	Outside Hitter	1.72 m (5 ft 8 in)	May 19, 2001 (age 25)	National-U
11	(Philippines)	Wielyn Estoque	Outside Hitter	1.72 m (5 ft 8 in)	April 8, 2001 (age 25)	St. Benilde
12	(Philippines)	Zam Nolasco	Middle Blocker	1.85 m (6 ft 1 in)	April 30, 2004 (age 22)	St. Benilde
14	(Philippines)	Alyanna Ong	Middle Blocker	1.73 m (5 ft 8 in)	February 22, 2003 (age 23)	Mapúa
15	(Philippines)	AC Miner	Opposite Hitter	1.80 m (5 ft 11 in)	January 21, 2003 (age 23)	Ateneo
16	(Philippines)	Alyssa Eroa	Libero	1.50 m (4 ft 11 in)	September 6, 1996 (age 30)	San Sebastian
17	(Philippines)	Fiola Ceballos	Outside Hitter	1.70 m (5 ft 7 in)	June 21, 1994 (age 32)	Central Philippine
18	(Philippines)	Jolina Dela Cruz	Outside Hitter	1.75 m (5 ft 9 in)	September 5, 1999 (age 27)	De La Salle
19	(Philippines)	Riza Nogales	Middle Blocker	1.63 m (5 ft 4 in)	December 3, 2002 (age 23)	UE
21	(Philippines)	Cloanne Mondoñedo (C)	Setter	1.68 m (5 ft 6 in)	November 16, 2000 (age 26)	St. Benilde
22	(Philippines)	Mary Angela Jackson	Middle Blocker	1.73 m (5 ft 8 in)	June 22, 2004 (age 22)	UP
24	(Philippines)	Chie Saet	Setter	1.64 m (5 ft 5 in)	November 24, 1984 (age 41)	De La Salle
25	(Philippines)	Karen Verdeflor	Libero	1.55 m (5 ft 1 in)	September 24, 2000 (age 26)	Adamson
Updated as of: October 22, 2026 | Source: PVL.ph

Coaching staff

- Head coach:
  Jerry Yee
- Assistant coaches:
  Rogelio Getigan
  Justine Dorog
  Mark Santos
  Kirk Beliran
- Statistician:
  Abigail Magatoc
- Strength & conditioning coach:
  Paul Ericta & Jimbo Arceo

Team staff

- Team manager:
  Jacob Lao
- Team coordinator:
  Gizelle Sy

Medical staff

- Physiotherapist:
  Juana Roxas

== Draft ==
Round	Pick	Player	Pos.	School
1	4	Alyanna Ong	MB	Mapúa

The Zus Coffee Thunderbelles selected Alyanna Ong with the 4th pick overall before passing during the second round.

== PVL on Tour ==
=== Results summary ===
Team	Game		
Team	1	2	3
Zus Coffee (ZUS)	AKA; 3–1	CMF; 3–0	HSH; *Aug. 8

Source: Premier Volleyball League
Legend: Blue = win; Red = loss

== All-Filipino Conference ==
=== Preliminary round ===
==== Standings ====
Pos	Team	Pld	W	L	Pts	SW	SL	SR	SPW	SPL	SPR
5	PLDT High Speed Hitters	8	4	4	13	15	15	1.000	677	666	1.017
6	Akari Chargers	8	3	5	9	14	19	0.737	724	745	0.972
7	Capital1 Solar Spikers	8	3	5	7	13	21	0.619	720	761	0.946
8	Zus Coffee Thunderbelles	8	2	6	7	12	21	0.571	676	734	0.921
9	Galeries Tower Highrisers	8	1	7	4	11	23	0.478	683	789	0.866

Source: Premier Volleyball League

==== Match log ====
2026–27 PVL All-Filipino Conference Siklab series preliminary round match log
Total: 2–6 (7 points)
October: 0–4 (1 points)

Match	Date	Opponent	Sets	Total	Location Attendance	Record	Pts	Report
1	October 15, 2026	Choco Mucho	0–3	57–75	Ynares Center Antipolo; 1,469	0–1	0	P2
2	October 20, 2026	Capital1	2–3	95–107	SM Mall of Asia Arena; 385	0–2	1	P2
3	October 24, 2026	Creamline	1–3	85–92	Filoil Centre; 2,441	0–3	1	P2
4	October 29, 2026	PLDT	0–3	54–75	Santiago City Sports Arena; 2,688	0–4	1	P2

November: 2–2 (6 points)

Match	Date	Opponent	Sets	Total	Location Attendance	Record	Pts	Report
5	November 5, 2026	Farm Fresh	2–3	100–102	PhilSports Arena; 342	0–5	2	P2
6	November 10, 2026	Galeries Tower	3–2	103–102	Smart Araneta Coliseum; 139	1–5	4	P2
7	November 17, 2026	Akari	3–1	97–86	PhilSports Arena; 843	2–5	7	P2
8	November 21, 2026	Nxled	1–3	85–95	PhilSports Arena; 1,309	2–6	7	P2

== Transactions ==
=== Additions ===
Player	Date signed	Previous team	Ref.
Jolina Dela Cruz	July 7, 2026	Farm Fresh Foxies	
Chenae Basarte	July 7, 2026	Benilde Lady Blazers (NCAA)	
Zam Nolasco	July 7, 2026	Benilde Lady Blazers (NCAA)	
Alyanna Ong	July 7, 2026	Mapúa Lady Cardinals (NCAA)	

=== Subtractions ===
Player	New team	Ref.
Thea Gagate	Denso Airybees (SV.League)	
Jade Gentapa	Galeries Tower Highrisers	
Maika Ortiz	Retired	
Renee Penafiel	Farm Fresh Foxies	
