= Premier Volleyball League Rookie of the Year and Conference awards =

Premier Volleyball League award

The Premier Volleyball League Rookie of the Year and Rookie of the Conference awards are Premier Volleyball League awards given to the best performing first-year player during the season or conference. The conference award was first introduced in the 2024 Reinforced Conference. The PVL Press Corps introduced the season award at the end of the 2024–25 season. As of the 2025–26 season, this award is only given out after the All-Filipino Conference and Reinforced Conference.

== Key ==
^	Denotes player who is still active in the PVL
Team (#)	Denotes the number of times a player from this team has won

== Rookie of the Year ==
=== Winners ===
Season	Player	Nat.	Team	Ref.
2024–25	Thea Gagate^	(Philippines)	Zus Coffee Thunderbelles	
2025–26	Bella Belen^	(Philippines)	Capital1 Solar Spikers	

== Rookie of the Conference ==
=== Winners ===
Season	Conference	Player	Nat.	Team	Ref.
2024–25	Reinforced	Shayra Ancheta^	(Philippines)	Zus Coffee Thunderbelles	
2024–25	2024–25 All-Filipino	Ishie Lalongisip^	(Philippines)	Cignal HD Spikers	
2025–26	Reinforced	AC Miner^	(Philippines)	Zus Coffee Thunderbelles	
2025–26	All-Filipino	Bella Belen^	(Philippines)	Capital1 Solar Spikers	

=== Teams ===
Awards	Team	Conferences
2	Zus Coffee Thunderbelles	2024 Reinforced, 2025 Reinforced
