= 2024–25 Zus Coffee Thunderbelles season =

Filipino women's volleyball team season

The 2024–25 Zus Coffee Thunderbelles season was the inaugural season of the Zus Coffee Thunderbelles in the Premier Volleyball League (PVL). The team was known as Strong Group Athletics before renaming ahead of the 2024 Reinforced Conference.

Ahead of the 2024–25 All-Filipino Conference, the team signed volleyball veteran Jovelyn Gonzaga from the Cignal HD Spikers before doing a sister team transfer with the Farm Fresh Foxies, which saw three of its players move to Zus Coffee. Despite a 2–1 start throughout November, the team wasn't able to continue the momentum, finishing the preliminary round with a 4–7 record with 14 points, ending up at ninth place. After a loss to the PLDT High Speed Hitters in the qualifying round, the team was placed in Pool A of the play-in tournament. They first beat Cignal in five sets, and with a four-set victory over the Capital1 Solar Strikers, the team advanced to the final round. In the best-of-three quarterfinals against the Petro Gazz Angels, the Thunderbelles were able to sweep the first match, but were swept in the last two matches, ending their run in a reverse sweep.

== Roster ==
Zus Coffee Thunderbelles
No.	Player	Position	Height	Birth date	School
1	(Philippines) Michelle Gamit	Middle Blocker	1.73 m (5 ft 8 in)	May 9, 2000 (age 26)	Benilde
3	(Philippines) Thea Gagate	Middle Blocker	1.88 m (6 ft 2 in)	July 6, 2000 (age 26)	DLSU
4	(Philippines) Kate Santiago	Outside Hitter	1.70 m (5 ft 7 in)	January 26, 2002 (age 24)	Adamson
5	(Philippines) Glaudine Troncoso	Outside Hitter	1.77 m (5 ft 10 in)	October 13, 1997 (age 28)	CPU
6	(Philippines) Julia Angeles	Libero	1.63 m (5 ft 4 in)	September 1, 1998 (age 27)	Letran
7	(Philippines) Jade Gentapa	Outside Hitter	1.72 m (5 ft 8 in)	November 28, 2000 (age 23)	Benilde
8	(Philippines) Cloanne Mondoñedo (C)	Setter	1.68 m (5 ft 6 in)	November 16, 2000 (age 25)	Benilde
9	(Philippines) Gayle Pascual	Opposite Hitter	1.72 m (5 ft 8 in)	September 3, 1999 (age 24)	Benilde
10	(Philippines) Chinnie Pia Arroyo	Outside Hitter	1.72 m (5 ft 8 in)	May 19, 2001 (age 25)	NU
11	(Philippines) Jenina Marie Zeta	Libero	1.55 m (5 ft 1 in)	November 12, 1999 (age 26)	UE
12	(Philippines) Joan Narit	Middle Blocker	1.80 m (5 ft 11 in)	December 4, 2000 (age 25)	Ateneo
13	(Philippines) Sharya Ancheta	Middle Blocker	1.77 m (5 ft 10 in)	November 25, 1999 (age 26)	AdU
14	(Philippines) Dolly Versoza	Outside Hitter	1.65 m (5 ft 5 in)	March 10, 1998 (age 28)	JRU
16	(Philippines) Nikka Yandoc	Setter	1.68 m (5 ft 6 in)	January 10, 2000 (age 26)	AdU
18	(Philippines) Danivah Sheilo Aying	Opposite Hitter	1.67 m (5 ft 6 in)	March 31, 2001 (age 25)	USJ-R
21	(Philippines) Jovelyn Gonzaga	Opposite Hitter	1.73 m (5 ft 8 in)	October 31, 1991 (age 34)	CPU
22	(Philippines) Ypril Tapia	Outside Hitter	1.62 m (5 ft 4 in)	December 15, 2001 (age 24)	UST

Coaching staff
Position	Name
Head Coach	(Philippines) Jerry Yee
Assistant Coach 1	(Philippines) Rogelio Getigan
Assistant Coach 2	(Philippines) Justine Dorog
Strength and Conditioning Coach	(Philippines) Johnson Bariso
Trainer	(Philippines) Abigail Magptoc
Trainer	(Philippines) Juana Roxas
Physiotherapist	(Philippines) Christine Magtibay
Team Manager	(Philippines) Jacob Lao

== 2024 All-Filipino Conference ==
=== Preliminary round ===
==== Standings ====
Pos	Team	Pld	W	L	Pts	SW	SL	SR	SPW	SPL	SPR
8	Nxled Chameleons	11	4	7	11	14	23	0.609	794	824	0.964
9	Farm Fresh Foxies	11	3	8	11	14	24	0.583	785	863	0.910
10	Galeries Tower Highrisers	11	3	8	9	11	26	0.423	689	832	0.828
11	Capital1 Solar Spikers	11	1	10	4	5	31	0.161	631	860	0.734
12	Strong Group Athletics	11	0	11	0	1	33	0.030	532	844	0.630

Source: TeamPilipinas.info

==== Match log ====
2024 PVL All-Filipino Conference preliminary round match log
Total: 0–11 (0 points)
February: 0–2 (0 points)

Match	Date	Opponent	Sets	Total	Location Attendance	Record	Pts	Report
1	February 20, 2024	Petro Gazz	0–3	44–75	PhilSports Arena; 335	0–1	0	P2
2	February 24, 2024	Chery Tiggo	0–3	48–75	PhilSports Arena; 1,563	0–2	0	P2

March: 0–4 (4 points)

Match	Date	Opponent	Sets	Total	Location Attendance	Record	Pts	Report
3	March 5, 2024	Capital1	1–3	83–94	PhilSports Arena; 181	0–3	0	P2
4	March 12, 2024	Creamline	0–3	45–75	PhilSports Arena; 722	0–4	0	P2
5	March 19, 2024	Cignal	0–3	39–75	Filoil EcoOil Centre; 1,027	0–5	0	P2
6	March 23, 2024	Galeries Tower	0–3	43–75	Ynares Center; 1,469	0–6	0	P2

April: 0–5 (0 points)

Match	Date	Opponent	Sets	Total	Location Attendance	Record	Pts	Report
7	April 4, 2024	Nxled	0–3	47–75	PhilSports Arena; 340	0–7	0	P2
8	April 9, 2024	PLDT	0–3	50–75	PhilSports Arena; 507	0–8	0	P2
9	April 13, 2024	Choco Mucho	0–3	47–75	PhilSports Arena; 3,399	0–9	0	P2
10	April 18, 2024	Farm Fresh	0–3	47–75	Smart Araneta Coliseum; 8,264	0–10	0	P2
11	April 27, 2024	Akari	0–3	39–75	PhilSports Arena; 396	0–11	0	P2

== Draft ==
Round	Pick	Player	Position	School
1	1	Thea Gagate	MB	DLSU
2	13	Sharya Ancheta	MB	Adamson
3	19	Nikka Yandoc	S	Adamson
4	22	Jenina Zeta	L	UE

The Zus Coffee Thunderbelles selected Thea Gagate with the 1st overall pick along with three other draftees in the next three rounds.

== Reinforced Conference ==
=== Preliminary round ===
==== Standings ====
Pos	Team	Pld	W	L	Pts	SW	SL	SR	SPW	SPL	SPR	Qualification
8	Farm Fresh Foxies	8	3	5	8	11	17	0.647	575	576	0.998	Quarterfinals
9	Choco Mucho Flying Titans	8	2	6	7	11	21	0.524	661	693	0.954	
10	Nxled Chameleons	8	1	7	3	6	23	0.261	510	609	0.837	
11	Galeries Tower Highrisers	8	0	8	4	11	24	0.458	728	842	0.865	
12	Zus Coffee Thunderbelles	8	0	8	0	3	24	0.125	505	657	0.769	

Source: Premier Volleyball League

==== Match log ====
2024 PVL Reinforced Conference preliminary round match log
Total: 0–8 (0 points)
July: 0–3 (0 points)

Match	Date	Opponent	Sets	Total	Location Attendance	Record	Pts	Report
1	July 18, 2024	Petro Gazz	0–3	58–75	PhilSports Arena; 876	0–1	0	P2
2	July 23, 2024	Cignal	1–3	92–100	PhilSports Arena; 660	0–2	0	P2
3	July 27, 2024	Choco Mucho	1–3	82–89	PhilSports Arena; 1,843	0–3	0	P2

August: 0–5 (0 points)

Match	Date	Opponent	Sets	Total	Location Attendance	Record	Pts	Report
4	August 1, 2024	Akari	0–3	56–75	PhilSports Arena; 1,138	0–4	0	P2
5	August 6, 2024	Capital1	1–3	82–93	PhilSports Arena; 1,295	0–5	0	P2
6	August 13, 2024	PLDT	0–3	44–75	PhilSports Arena; 1,536	0–6	0	P2
7	August 17, 2024	Chery Tiggo	0–3	55–75	SM Mall of Asia Arena; 890	0–7	0	P2
8	August 22, 2024	Creamline	0–3	54–75	Filoil EcoOil Centre; 919	0–8	0	P2

== 2024–25 All-Filipino Conference ==
=== Preliminary round ===
==== Standings ====
Pos	Team	Pld	W	L	Pts	SW	SL	SR	SPW	SPL	SPR	Qualification
7	Akari Chargers	11	5	6	15	16	22	0.727	844	868	0.972	Qualifying round
8	Chery Tiggo Crossovers	11	5	6	14	20	24	0.833	957	966	0.991	Qualifying round
9	Zus Coffee Thunderbelles	11	4	7	14	20	23	0.870	958	962	0.996	Qualifying round
10	Galeries Tower Highrisers	11	1	10	5	10	30	0.333	835	949	0.880	Qualifying round
11	Capital1 Solar Spikers	11	1	10	5	8	31	0.258	754	926	0.814	Qualifying round

Source: Premier Volleyball League

==== Match log ====
2024–25 PVL All-Filipino Conference preliminary round match log
Total: 4–7 (14 points)
November: 2–1 (6 points)

Match	Date	Opponent	Sets	Total	Location Attendance	Record	Pts	Report
1	November 14, 2024	Akari	1–3	83–94	Filoil EcoOil Centre; 825	0–1	0	P2
2	November 19, 2024	Nxled	3–1	94–85	Ynares Center; 338	1–1	3	P2
3	November 28, 2024	Galeries Tower	3–0	75–57	PhilSports Arena; 659	2–1	6	P2

December: 0–2 (1 point)

Match	Date	Opponent	Sets	Total	Location Attendance	Record	Pts	Report
4	December 5, 2024	Farm Fresh	1–3	89–89	Smart Araneta Coliseum; 405	2–2	6	P2
5	December 12, 2024	Creamline	2–3	114–111	PhilSports Arena; 2,299	2–3	7	P2

January: 2–1 (7 points)

Match	Date	Opponent	Sets	Total	Location Attendance	Record	Pts	Report
6	January 18, 2025	Choco Mucho	2–3	103–105	PhilSports Arena; 2,875	2–4	8	P2
7	January 25, 2025	Capital1	3–0	81–59	PhilSports Arena; 850	3–4	11	P2
8	January 30, 2025	Chery Tiggo	3–1	98–89	PhilSports Arena; 277	4–4	14	P2

February: 0–3 (0 points)

Match	Date	Opponent	Sets	Total	Location Attendance	Record	Pts	Report
9	February 4, 2025	Petro Gazz	1–3	92–102	PhilSports Arena; 715	4–5	14	P2
10	February 13, 2025	Cignal	1–3	76–96	Ninoy Aquino Stadium; 1,385	4–6	14	P2
11	February 22, 2025	PLDT	0–3	51–75	City of Passi Arena; 2,278	4–7	14	P2

=== Qualifying round ===
==== Match log ====
2024–25 PVL All-Filipino Conference qualifying round match log
Total: 0–1 (0 points)
Qualifying round: 0–1 (0 points)

Date	Opponent	Sets	Total	Location Attendance	Report
March 4, 2025	PLDT	1–3	89–96	PhilSports Arena; 789	P2

=== Play-in tournament ===
==== Pool A standings ====
Pos	Team	Pld	W	L	Pts	SW	SL	SR	SPW	SPL	SPR	Qualification
1	Zus Coffee Thunderbelles	2	2	0	5	6	3	2.000	200	186	1.075	Final round
2	Cignal HD Spikers	2	1	1	4	5	4	1.250	202	185	1.092	
3	Capital1 Solar Spikers	2	0	2	0	2	6	0.333	159	190	0.837	

Source: Premier Volleyball League

==== Match log ====
2024–25 PVL All-Filipino Conference play-in tournament match log
Total: 2–0 (5 points)
Play-in tournament: 2–0 (5 points)

Match	Date	Opponent	Sets	Total	Location Attendance	Record	Pts	Report
1	March 11, 2025	Cignal	3–2	107–105	PhilSports Arena; 677	1–0	2	P2
2	March 13, 2025	Capital1	3–1	93–81	PhilSports Arena; 480	2–0	5	P2

=== Final round ===
==== Bracket ====
Quarterfinals
1	Creamline	2
8	Chery Tiggo	0
2	Petro Gazz	2
7	Zus Coffee	1
3	Galeries Tower	0
6	Akari	2
4	PLDT	0
5	Choco Mucho	2

Semifinals
Creamline	6
Petro Gazz	9
Choco Mucho	1
Akari	2

Finals
Championship
Creamline	1
Petro Gazz	2
Third-place
Choco Mucho	1
Akari	2

==== Match log ====
2024–25 PVL All-Filipino Conference final round match log
Total: 7–2 (21 points)
Quarterfinals: 2–1 (6 points)

Match	Date	Opponent	Sets	Total	Location Attendance	Series	Report
1	March 18, 2025	Petro Gazz	3–0	77–69	PhilSports Arena; 2,611	1–0	P2
2	March 22, 2025	Petro Gazz	0–3	58–78	Ynares Center Antipolo; 3,224	1–1	P2
3	March 25, 2025	Petro Gazz	0–3	63–75	PhilSports Arena; 608	1–2	P2

== Transactions ==
=== Additions ===
Player	Date signed	Previous team	Ref.
Angelica Dacaymat	February 15, 2024	Marikina Lady Shoemasters (MPVA)	
Ayumi Furukawa	February 15, 2024	Ateneo Blue Eagles (UAAP)	
Chumcee Ann Caole	February 15, 2024	Nasipit Lady Spikers (MPVA)	
Dolly Verzosa	February 15, 2024	JRU Lady Bombers (NCAA)	
Grenlen Malapit	February 15, 2024	Marikina Lady Shoemasters (MPVA)	
Jan Angeli Cane	February 15, 2024	Ateneo Blue Eagles (UAAP)	
Jana Sta. Maria	February 15, 2024	Nasipit Lady Spikers (MPVA)	
Javen Sabas	February 15, 2024	Kurashiki Ablaze (Japan)	
Jean Licauco	February 15, 2024	Ateneo Blue Eagles (UAAP)	
Justin Rebleza	February 15, 2024	Marikina Lady Shoemasters (MPVA)	
Lilet Mabbayad	February 15, 2024	San Juan Lady Knights (MPVA)	
Mary Joy Onofre	February 15, 2024	Marikina Lady Shoemasters (MPVA)	
Melanie Romero	February 15, 2024	Marikina Lady Shoemasters (MPVA)	
Merry Rose Jauculan	February 15, 2024	UST Golden Tigresses (UAAP)	
Nikkie Baldizanso	February 15, 2024	UP Fighting Maroons (UAAP)	
Noheli Cerdeña	February 15, 2024	Nasipit Lady Spikers (MPVA)	
Sarah Verutiao	February 15, 2024	Quezon City Gerflor Defenders	
Sheeka Espinosa	February 15, 2024	Nasipit Lady Spikers (MPVA)	
Souzan Raslan	February 15, 2024	Marinerang Pilipina Lady Skippers (PSL)	
Valiza Fornilos	February 15, 2024	Ateneo Blue Eagles (UAAP)	
Vira Guillema	February 15, 2024	Marikina Lady Shoemasters (MPVA)	
Cloanne Mondoñedo	May 27, 2024	Benilde Lady Blazers (NCAA)	
Gayle Pascual	May 27, 2024	Benilde Lady Blazers (NCAA)	
Jade Gentapa	May 27, 2024	Benilde Lady Blazers (NCAA)	
Michelle Gamit	May 27, 2024	Benilde Lady Blazers (NCAA)	
Thea Gagate	July 10, 2024	DLSU Lady Spikers (UAAP)	
Sharya Ancheta	July 10, 2024	Adamson Lady Falcons (UAAP)	
Nikka Yandoc	July 10, 2024	Adamson Lady Falcons (UAAP)	
Jenina Zeta	July 10, 2024	UE Lady Red Warriors (UAAP)	
Ypril Tapia	August 5, 2024	Farm Fresh Foxies	
Jaycel Delos Reyes	August 5, 2024	Farm Fresh Foxies	
Julia Angeles	August 5, 2024	Farm Fresh Foxies	
Danivah Aying	August 5, 2024	Galeries Tower Highrisers	
Jovelyn Gonzaga	October 15, 2024	Cignal HD Spikers	
Chinnie Pia Arroyo	October 20, 2024	Farm Fresh Foxies	
Joan Narit	October 20, 2024	Farm Fresh Foxies	
Kate Santiago	October 20, 2024	Farm Fresh Foxies	
Glaudine Troncoso	November 2, 2024	Cignal HD Spikers	

=== Subtractions ===
Player	New team	Ref.
Angelica Dacaymat	Free agent	
Chumcee Ann Caole	Free agent	
Grenlen Malapit	Free agent	
Jan Angeli Cane	Free agent	
Jana Sta. Maria	Free agent	
Javen Sabas	Free agent	
Jean Licauco	Free agent	
Justin Rebleza	Free agent	
Lilet Mabbayad	Free agent	
Melanie Romero	Free agent	
Merry Rose Jauculan	Free agent	
Nikkie Baldizanso	Free agent	
Noheli Cerdeña	Free agent	
Sarah Verutiao	Free agent	
Sheeka Espinosa	Free agent	
Souzan Raslan	Free agent	
Valiza Fornilos	Free agent	
Vira Guillema	Free agent	
Ayumi Furukawa	Capital1 Solar Spikers	
Jaycel Delos Reyes	Nxled Chameleons	

=== Foreign guest player ===
Team	Foreign player	Moving from	Ref.
Zus Coffee Thunderbelles	(Japan) Asaka Tamaru	(Japan) Kurashiki Ablaze	

=== Coaching changes ===
Team	Outgoing coach	Manner of departure	Replaced by	Ref
Zus Coffee Thunderbelles	(Philippines) Rogelio Getigan	Reassigned	(Philippines) Jerry Yee	
