= 2024 Premier Volleyball League draft =

Inaugural edition of the PVL draft

2024 Premier Volleyball League Rookie Draft

General information
- Sport: Volleyball
- Date: July 8, 2024
- Location: Novotel Manila Araneta City, Quezon City
- Network: One Sports

Overview
- 23 total selections in 4 rounds
- League: Premier Volleyball League
- Teams: 12
- First selection: Thea Gagate (Zus Coffee Thunderbelles)
- Most selections (4): Zus Coffee Thunderbelles; Galeries Tower Highrisers

The 2024 Premier Volleyball League draft was the inaugural rookie draft for the Premier Volleyball League, the top-level women's professional volleyball league in the Philippines, conducted on July 8, 2024 at Novotel Manila Araneta City in Quezon City.

The draft was held in the middle of the league's 2024–25 season, after the 2024 All-Filipino Conference and before the Reinforced Conference. It is the only draft to be held mid-season as the league transitions to the current June to May calendar.

== Key dates ==
Table of key dates
Event	Date(s)
Submission of applicants' draft requirements.	May 19–June 12, 2024
Announcement of the list of applicants.	June 15, 2024
Combine registration for free agents.	June 18–21, 2024
Draft lottery day.	June 24, 2024
Rookie draft combine	June 25–26, 2024
PVL Rookie Draft event.	July 8, 2024
Contract signing among drafted players.	July 8–23, 2024

== Eligibility and entrants ==
The following were the eligibility requirements for the draft:

- Has not previously competed in the league since the 2021 Premier Volleyball League season.
- At least 21 years old by December 31, 2024.
- For Filipinos with foreign citizenship: Philippine passport or birth certificate issued in the Philippines.
- No academic qualifications or playing experience is required.

Within fifteen (15) days, draftees must:

- Obtain a minimum three-year (two-year guaranteed and one-year extension option) contract offer for first-round picks.
- Obtain a minimum one-year contract for the second round and later picks.
- Obtain a minimum one-conference contract for the undrafted players signed by teams.

If drafted players cannot secure a contract for their teams, they are considered free-agent unsigned draftees. They will undergo a special draft arranged by the league following the same arrangement, excluding the team that failed to sign them.

The deadline for entrant submissions was set on May 31, 2024, but was extended to June 12, 2024.

=== Draft entrants ===
From an initial list of 50 players, 47 applicants were officially listed for the draft.

==== UAAP players ====
- Abi Goc – OH, University of the Philippines
- Angelica Alcantara – S, Adamson University
- Antonette Adolfo – OP, Adamson University
- Dara Nieva – OP, University of the East
- Dea Villamor – L, University of the East
- Ishie Lalongisip – OH, Adamson University
- Jenina Zeta – L, University of the East
- Jewel Encarnacion – OH, University of the Philippines
- Julia Coronel – S, De La Salle University
- Karen Verdeflor – L, Adamson University
- Leila Cruz – OP, De La Salle University
- Lucille Almonte – OH, Adamson University
- Maicah Larroza – OH/L, De La Salle University
- Nikka Yandoc – S, Adamson University
- Pierre Abellana – OH, University of Santo Tomas
- Roma Mae Doromal – L, Ateneo de Manila University
- Shayra Ancheta – MB, Adamson University
- Stephanie Bustrillo – OP, University of the Philippines
- Thea Gagate – MB, De La Salle University

==== UAAP training pool and former players ====
- Caroline Santos – MB, De La Salle University
- Lalaine CJ Evangelista – MB, National University
- Giliana Torres – OH, De La Salle University
- Mary Grace Vernaiz – OH, University of Santo Tomas
- Remcel Santos – MB, University of the East
- Ysabela Bakabak – MB, De La Salle University

==== NCAA players ====
- Bay Anne de Leon – OH, Colegio de San Juan de Letran
- Camille Belaro – L, Lyceum of the Philippines University
- Cathrine Almazan – OH, Emilio Aguinaldo College
- Charmina Diño – OH, Arellano University
- Daisy Melendres – MB, Colegio de San Juan de Letran
- Dodee Batindaan – MB, Arellano University
- Donnalyn Paralejas – S, Arellano University
- Jewelle Bermillo – L, San Sebastian College – Recoletos
- Lalaine Arizapa – MB, San Beda University
- Lorraine Pecaña – MB, Arellano University
- Maxinne Tayag – OH, San Beda University
- Razel Aldea – MB, University of Perpetual Help System DALTA
- Robbie Mae Matawaran – MB, Arellano University
- Sandra Dayao – L, University of Perpetual Help System DALTA

==== Non-UAAP/NCAA players ====
- Andrea Jardio – MB, Lyceum of Alabang
- Danivah Aying – OP, University of San Jose–Recoletos
- Danya Casiño – MB, Trinity University of Asia
- Jamie Solina – S, Marinduque State University
- Lian Macasiray – L, De La Salle University – Dasmariñas
- Lovely Zapf – MB, De La Salle University – Dasmariñas

==== Foreign-based Filipino players ====
- Aleiah Torres – L, Brock University (Canada)
- Nathalie Ramacula – S/L, Red River College Polytechnic (Canada)

== Combine ==
The Rookie Draft Combine was held from June 25 to 26, 2024 at the Gameville Ball Park in Mandaluyong. It was a mandatory two-day event for draft applicants to undergo physical measures, medical tests, interviews, athletic tests, and scrimmages, all observed by coaches and officials.

The draft combine was also open to free-agent players who had played in the league starting from the 2021 season. Although free agents were ineligible to join the rookie draft, the event allowed them to show their skills, to be observed and potentially hired by teams. The deadline for registration for free agents was on June 21, 2024.

=== Free agent combine entrants ===
The following table shows the players listed for the combine for free agent players.

Player	Pos.	Last PVL team	Last PVL conference played
Bien Elaine Juanillo	OP	Gerflor Defenders	2023 2nd All-Filipino
Cathrina Dizon	MB	Capital1 Solar Spikers	2024 All-Filipino
Chumcee Caole	S	Strong Group Athletics (Note: Within the same season, Zus Coffee previously played under the name Strong Group Athletics in the 2024 All-Filipino Conference)	2024 All-Filipino
Dana Del Rosario	S	Capital1 Solar Spikers	2024 All-Filipino
Jan Angeli Cane	OH	Strong Group Athletics	2024 All-Filipino
Jana Sta. Maria	OP	Strong Group Athletics	2024 All-Filipino
Judith Abil	OH	Nxled Chameleons	2023 2nd All-Filipino
Lhara Maye Clavano	S	Gerflor Defenders	2023 2nd All-Filipino
Mary Angelei Jingco	OH	Gerflor Defenders	2023 2nd All-Filipino
Menchie Tubiera	OH	Gerflor Defenders	2023 2nd All-Filipino
Merry Rose Jauculan	OP	Strong Group Athletics	2024 All-Filipino
Pia Sarmiento	L	Gerflor Defenders	2023 2nd All-Filipino
Sheeka Gin Espinosa	OP	Strong Group Athletics	2024 All-Filipino
Souzan Raslan	OP	Strong Group Athletics	2024 All-Filipino

== Draft order ==
In the first round, the order of the four worst-performing teams was determined through a lottery, for the ability to pick the first to fourth picks. This practice was designed to discourage any tanking by teams in order to influence the pick order in potential future drafts. The remaining eight teams were arranged based on the reverse final standing at the 2024 All-Filipino Conference. The draft lottery results revealed that Zus Coffee Thunderbelles got the inaugural top draft pick, from which the arrangement of the next teams followed their exact reverse standings in the 2024 All-Filipino. The draft concluded when all 12 teams passed the draft selection.

For the second and subsequent rounds, the draft order continued to use the reverse final standing of the said conference, with the worst team picking first and the champions picking last.

Draft order	Team	2024 AFC result	
Draft order	Team	Placement	Record (W-L)
1st	Zus Coffee Thunderbelles	12th	0–11
2nd	Capital1 Solar Spikers	11th	1–10
3rd	Galeries Tower Highrisers	10th	3–8
4th	Farm Fresh Foxies	9th	3–8
5th	Nxled Chameleons	8th	4–7
6th	Akari Chargers	7th	5–6
7th	Cignal HD Spikers	6th	7–4
8th	PLDT High Speed Hitters	5th	8–3
9th	Chery Tiggo Crossovers	4th	10–6
10th	Petro Gazz Angels	3rd	11–5
11th	Choco Mucho Flying Titans	2nd	12–4
12th	Creamline Cool Smashers	1st	12–4

== Draft selections ==
Positions key
OH	Outside hitter	MB	Middle blocker	OP	Opposite hitter	S	Setter	L	Libero

‡	National Team Member
	PVL Premier Team Awardee
★	PVL PC Rookie of the Year
	Rookie of the Conference
Player (in italic text)	Unsigned drafted player

=== 1st round ===
Pick	Player	Pos.	Team	College/University
1	Thea Gagate ‡ ★	MB	Zus Coffee Thunderbelles	De La Salle University
2	Leila Cruz ‡	OP	Capital1 Solar Spikers	De La Salle University
3	Julia Coronel ‡	S	Galeries Tower Highrisers	De La Salle University
4	Maicah Larroza	OH/L	Farm Fresh Foxies	De La Salle University
5	Lucille Almonte	OH	Nxled Chameleons	Adamson University
6	Stephanie Bustrillo	OP	Akari Chargers	University of the Philippines
7	Ishie Lalongisip	OH	Cignal HD Spikers	Adamson University
8	Angelica Alcantara	S	PLDT High Speed Hitters	Adamson University
9	Karen Verdeflor	L	Chery Tiggo Crossovers	Adamson University
10	Antonette Adolfo	OP	Petro Gazz Angels	Adamson University
11	Lorraine Pecaña	MB	Choco Mucho Flying Titans	Arellano University
12	Aleiah Torres	L/OH	Creamline Cool Smashers	Brock University

=== 2nd round ===
Pick	Player	Pos.	Team	College/University
13	Sharya Ancheta	MB	Zus Coffee Thunderbelles	Adamson University
14	Roma Mae Doromal	L	Capital1 Solar Spikers	Ateneo de Manila University
15	Jewel Encarnacion	OH	Galeries Tower Highrisers	University of the Philippines
16	Pierre Abellana	OH	Farm Fresh Foxies	University of Santo Tomas
17	Razel Aldea	MB	Nxled Chameleons	University of Perpetual Help System DALTA
18	Donnalyn Paralejas	S	Petro Gazz Angels	Arellano University

- Akari, Cignal, PLDT, Chery Tiggo, Choco Mucho and Creamline passed during the round.

=== 3rd round ===
Pick	Player	Pos.	Team	College/University
19	Nikka Yandoc	S	Zus Coffee Thunderbelles	Adamson University
20	Giliana Torres	OH	Capital1 Solar Spikers	De La Salle University
21	Dodee Batindaan	MB	Galeries Tower Highrisers	Arellano University

- Farm Fresh, Nxled and Petro Gazz passed during the round.

=== 4th round ===
Pick	Player	Pos.	Team	College/University
22	Jenina Zeta	L	Zus Coffee Thunderbelles	University of the East
23	Danivah Aying	OP	Galeries Tower Highrisers	University of San Jose–Recoletos

- Capital1 passed during the round.

=== 5th round ===
A fifth round was held, but all remaining teams passed, thus ending the draft.

== Draft lottery ==
The draft lottery determined the arrangement of the four lowest-ranked teams in selecting draft applicants in the first round. The lottery was held on the June 24, 2024 broadcast of The Starting Lineup of RPTV.

External videos
- 2024 PVL Draft Lottery Drawing, PVL's official YouTube channel. June 25, 2024.

Denotes the actual lottery result

Team	2024 AFC		1st pick Lottery chances	Lottery probabilities			
Team	Placement	Record	1st pick Lottery chances	1st	2nd	3rd	4th
Zus Coffee Thunderbelles	12th	0–11	40	40.0%	31.6%	20.6%	7.8%
Capital1 Solar Spikers	11th	1–10	30	30.0%	30.8%	26.2%	13.0%
Galeries Tower Highrisers	10th	3–8	20	20.0%	24.1%	31.7%	24.1%
Farm Fresh Foxies	9th	3–8	10	10.0%	13.5%	21.4%	55.1%

== Summary ==
=== Draft picks per school ===
School	Rounds		Total
School	1st	After 1st	Total
Adamson University	5	2	7
De La Salle University	4	1	5
Arellano University	1	2	3
University of the Philippines	1	1	2
Other schools			1 each

=== Draft picks per position ===
Position	Rounds		Total
Position	1st	After 1st	Total
Outside hitter	3	3	6
Middle blocker	2	3	5
Opposite hitter	3	1	4
Setter	2	2	4
Libero	2	2	4

== Acquisitions involving draft picks and undrafted free agents ==
- July 16, 2024: Akari
  - Akari acquired Cathrine Almazan and Ysabela Bakabak, undrafted and free-agent players.
- August 3, 2024: Zus Coffee
  - Zus Coffee acquired Danivah Aying, a 4th-round pick originally drafted by the Galeries Tower through a special draft for unsigned draftees.
- November 12, 2024: Chery Tiggo
  - Chery Tiggo acquired Mary Grace Vernaiz, an undrafted and free-agent player.
- November 16, 2024: Cignal
  - Cignal acquired Caroline Santos and Camille Belaro, undrafted and free-agent players.
