= 2025 PVL Press Corps Awards Night =

- Type: Sports
- Awarded for: Premier Volleyball League and Spikers' Turf
- Date: May 28, 2025
- Venue: Novotel Manila Araneta City
- Country: Philippines
- Presented by: ArenaPlus, Pilipinas Live, and PVL Press Corps

The 2025 Pilipinas Live PVL Press Corps Awards Night was the inaugural awards show of the PVL Press Corps Awards Night. It will also recognize personalities from the main volleyball leagues in the Philippines, Premier Volleyball League, and Spikers' Turf. It was held on May 28, 2025, at the Novotel Manila Araneta City in Quezon City.

== Criteria ==
The winners will be decided based on overall statistics from the three conferences and votes from team representatives and members of the PVL Press Corps to ensure objective and impartial selections. The scope of the awards will span the following conferences/seasons:

- Premier Volleyball League
  - 2024–25 season (except 2024 All-Filipino Conference)
- Spikers' Turf
  - 2024–25 season

== Premier Volleyball League awardees ==
=== Main awards ===
Individual awards
Award	Recipient	Team	Ref.
Most Valuable Player of the Season	Brooke Van Sickle (227.6); Bernadeth Pons (205.6); Michele Gumabao (151.4)	Petro Gazz Angels	
Rookie of the Year	Thea Gagate (148.1); Ishie Lalongisip (125.8); Angelica Alcantara (105.5)	Zus Coffee Thunderbelles	
Coach of the Year	Sherwin Meneses (11.0); Koji Tsuzurabara (9.6); Takayuki Minowa (2.4)	Creamline Cool Smashers	
Executive of the Year	Jonathan Ng (12.8); Ricky Villavicencio (5.8); Christopher Tiu (4.4)	Creamline Cool Smashers	
Mythical team
Position	Player	Team	Ref.
Outside spikers	Brooke Van Sickle	Petro Gazz Angels	
Outside spikers	Bernadeth Pons	Creamline Cool Smashers	
Middle blockers	Majoy Baron	PLDT High Speed Hitters	
Middle blockers	Bea De Leon	Creamline Cool Smashers	
Opposite spiker	Trisha Tubu	Farm Fresh Foxies	
Setter	Gel Cayuna	Cignal HD Spikers	
Libero	Alyssa Eroa	Galeries Tower Highrisers	
Team awards
Award	Team	Record	Ref.
Team of the Year	Creamline Cool Smashers (13.6); Petro Gazz Angels (9.4)	2024 Reinforced Conference champions 2024 Invitational Conference champions	
Fair Play award	Chery Tiggo Crossovers	6 green cards	

=== Special awards ===
Special awards
Award	Player	Team	Ref.
Most Improved Player	Eli Soyud; Bernadeth Pons; Bea De Leon	Akari Chargers	
Comeback Player of the Year	Alyssa Eroa; Jovelyn Gonzaga; Savi Davison	Galeries Tower Highrisers	
Miss Quality Minutes	Chie Saet; Judith Abil; Royse Tubino	Petro Gazz Angels	
Fanvote awards
Award	Recipient/Event	Team(s)	Ref.
Star of the Night	Sisi Rondina	Choco Mucho Flying Titans	
Game of the Year	2024–25 All-Filipino; Quarterfinals Game 2	Choco Mucho Flying Titans & PLDT High Speed Hitters	
Fan Favorite winner	Deanna Wong (24,000); Jema Galanza (12,000); Alyssa Valdez (10,000)	Choco Mucho Flying Titans	

== Spikers' Turf awardees ==
Individual award
Award	Player	Team	Ref.
Most Valuable Player of the Season	Jude Garcia	Criss Cross King Crunchers	
Mythical team
Position	Player	Team	Ref.
Outside spikers	Jude Garcia	Criss Cross King Crunchers	
Outside spikers	Sherwin Caritativo	Savouge Spin Doctors	
Middle blockers	Gian Glorioso	Criss Cross King Crunchers	
Middle blockers	Giles Torres	Savouge Spin Doctors	
Opposite spiker	Steven Rotter	Cignal HD Spikers	
Setter	Ish Polvorosa	Criss Cross King Crunchers	
Libero	Vince Lorenzo	Cignal HD Spikers	

== Other awards ==
- Special Citation
  - Pilipinas Live
  - Arena Plus
