= 2024–25 Premier Volleyball League season =

Seventh season of the Premier Volleyball League

- League: Premier Volleyball League
- Sport: Volleyball
- Duration: February 20, 2024 – April 12, 2025
- TV partners: RPTV; One Sports; Cignal TV
- Streaming partner: Pilipinas Live

Draft
- Top draft pick: Thea Gagate
- Picked by: Zus Coffee

Conferences
- 2024 All-Filipino champions: Creamline
- 2024 All-Filipino runners-up: Choco Mucho
- 2024 Reinforced champions: Creamline
- 2024 Reinforced runners-up: Akari
- 2024 Invitational champions: Creamline
- 2024 Invitational runners-up: Cignal
- 2024–25 All-Filipino champions: Petro Gazz
- 2024–25 All-Filipino runners-up: Creamline

PVL seasons
- ← 2023 2025–26 →

The 2024–25 Premier Volleyball League (PVL) season was the eighth (Note: The 2024 season is considered as the eighth season of the PVL by its organizers. This is despite the prior iteration, the 2023 season considered as the sixth.) season of the Premier Volleyball League. The season began on February 20, 2024 with the beginning of the 2024 All-Filipino Conference and ended on April 12, 2025 with the start of the 2024–25 All-Filipino Conference. This season featured the inaugural Premier Volleyball League draft, which is held mid-season after the 2024 All-Filipino Conference. For the first time, the league sent its top teams to compete in the AVC Women's Volleyball Champions League after previous attempts fell through.

This season is considered to be an extended season in order to align the league's calendar with the FIVB calendar, which was later clarified by the league in January 2026. This meant that the season formally culminated with the 2025 PVL Press Corps Awards Night on May 28, 2025. It would also be the first season to span two calendar years.

The season saw the Creamline Cool Smashers become the first team to win all three conferences in a calendar year in what multiple publications consider to be the first Grand Slam in league history, despite featuring four conferences.

== 2024 All-Filipino Conference ==
The 2024 Premier Volleyball League All-Filipino Conference was the first conference of the 2024–25 Premier Volleyball League season. This conference was supposed to begin on February 17, 2024, but was later moved to February 20, 2024.

A total of twelve teams competed in this tournament; two new club teams were announced before the start of the conference. Meanwhile, the F2 Logistics Cargo Movers and Quezon City Gerflor Defenders withdrew from the PVL. Strong Group Athletics took over the Gerflor Defenders franchise. Capital1 Solar Spikers was unveiled as the 12th team and replaced the Cargo Movers.

=== Participating teams ===
2024 Premier Volleyball League All-Filipino Conference
Abbr.	Team	Affiliation	Head coach	Team captain
AKA	Akari Chargers	Akari Lighting & Technology	(Philippines) Raffy Mosuela	Michelle Cobb
CAP	Capital1 Solar Spikers	CapitalOne Energy Corp.	(Philippines) Roger Gorayeb	Jorelle Singh
CTC	Chery Tiggo Crossovers	United Asia Automotive Group	(Philippines) Kungfu Reyes	Aby Maraño
CMF	Choco Mucho Flying Titans	Republic Biscuit Corporation	(Philippines) Dante Alinsunurin	Maddie Madayag
CHD	Cignal HD Spikers	Cignal TV, Inc.	(Philippines) Shaq Delos Santos	Frances Molina
CCS	Creamline Cool Smashers	Republic Biscuit Corporation	(Philippines) Sherwin Meneses	Alyssa Valdez
FFF	Farm Fresh Foxies	Farm Fresh Philippine International / Strong Group Athletics	(Philippines) Jerry Yee	Louie Romero
GTH	Galeries Tower Highrisers	Grand Taipan Land Development	(Philippines) Lerma Giron	Dimdim Pacres
NXL	Nxled Chameleons	Akari Lighting & Technology	(Japan) Taka Minowa	Dani Ravena
PGA	PetroGazz Angels	PetroGazz Ventures Phils.	(Japan) Koji Tsuzurabara	Remy Palma
HSH	PLDT High Speed Hitters	PLDT Inc.	(Philippines) Rald Ricafort	Kath Arado
SGA	Strong Group Athletics	Strong Group Athletics	(Philippines) Rogelio Getigan	Dolly Versoza

=== Preliminary round ===
Pos	Team	Pld	W	L	Pts	SW	SL	SR	SPW	SPL	SPR	Qualification
1	Petro Gazz Angels	11	9	2	28	31	9	3.444	936	779	1.202	Final round
2	Choco Mucho Flying Titans	11	9	2	26	29	11	2.636	921	771	1.195	Final round
3	Chery Tiggo Crossovers	11	9	2	25	28	11	2.545	899	781	1.151	Final round
4	Creamline Cool Smashers	11	8	3	24	27	13	2.077	946	831	1.138	Final round
5	PLDT High Speed Hitters	11	8	3	23	25	12	2.083	859	726	1.183	
6	Cignal HD Spikers	11	7	4	22	23	14	1.643	869	747	1.163	
7	Akari Chargers	11	5	6	15	17	18	0.944	767	750	1.023	
8	Nxled Chameleons	11	4	7	11	14	23	0.609	794	824	0.964	
9	Farm Fresh Foxies	11	3	8	11	14	24	0.583	785	863	0.910	
10	Galeries Tower Highrisers	11	3	8	9	11	26	0.423	689	832	0.828	
11	Capital1 Solar Spikers	11	1	10	4	5	31	0.161	631	860	0.734	
12	Strong Group Athletics	11	0	11	0	1	33	0.030	532	844	0.630	

Source: TeamPilipinas.info

=== Final round ===
- All times are Philippine Standard Time (UTC+08:00).

==== Semifinals ====
Pos	Team	Pld	W	L	Pts	SW	SL	SR	SPW	SPL	SPR	Qualification
1	Choco Mucho Flying Titans	3	3	0	8	9	3	3.000	274	257	1.066	Championship
2	Creamline Cool Smashers	3	2	1	7	8	4	2.000	285	256	1.113	Championship
3	Petro Gazz Angels	3	1	2	3	5	7	0.714	282	279	1.011	3rd place
4	Chery Tiggo Crossovers	3	0	3	0	1	9	0.111	196	245	0.800	3rd place

Source: TeamPilipinas.info

==== Finals ====
===== 3rd place =====
Date	Time	Venue		Score		Set 1	Set 2	Set 3	Set 4	Set 5	Total	Report
May 9	16:00	SAC	Chery Tiggo Crossovers	2–3	Petro Gazz Angels	25–22	12–25	18–25	29–27	12–15	96–114	P2
May 12	16:00	SAC	Petro Gazz Angels	2–3	Chery Tiggo Crossovers	25–16	25–11	13–25	22–25	16–18	101–95	P2

===== Championship =====
Date	Time	Venue		Score		Set 1	Set 2	Set 3	Set 4	Set 5	Total	Report
May 9	18:00	SAC	Creamline Cool Smashers	3–1	Choco Mucho Flying Titans	24–26	25–20	25–21	25–16		99–83	P2
May 12	18:00	SAC	Choco Mucho Flying Titans	2–3	Creamline Cool Smashers	25–20	20–25	25–22	22–25	11–15	103–107	P2

=== Final standings ===
Rank	Team
1st place, gold medalist(s)	Creamline Cool Smashers
2nd place, silver medalist(s)	Choco Mucho Flying Titans
3rd place, bronze medalist(s)	Petro Gazz Angels
4	Chery Tiggo Crossovers
5	PLDT High Speed Hitters
6	Cignal HD Spikers
7	Akari Chargers
8	Nxled Chameleons
9	Farm Fresh Foxies
10	Galeries Tower Highrisers
11	Capital1 Solar Spikers
12	Strong Group Athletics

=== Awards ===
Individual awards

Award	Player	Team	Ref.
Conference Most Valuable Player	Brooke Van Sickle	Petro Gazz	
Finals Most Valuable Player	Jessica Margarett Galanza	Creamline	
1st Best Outside Spiker	Cherry Ann Rondina	Choco Mucho	
2nd Best Outside Spiker	Jessica Margarett Galanza	Creamline	
1st Best Middle Blocker	Madeleine Yrenea Madayag	Choco Mucho	
2nd Best Middle Blocker	Jeanette Panaga	Creamline	
Best Opposite Spiker	Aiza Maizo-Pontillas	Petro Gazz	
Best Setter	Kyle Angela Negrito	Creamline	
Best Libero	Toni Rose Ponce	Choco Mucho	

Special award

Award	Team	Ref.
Fair Play	Nxled Chameleons	

== Draft ==
The 2024 Premier Volleyball League draft was held on July 8, 2024, at Novotel Manila Araneta City in Quezon City. The first pick was made by the Zus Coffee Thunderbelles.

== 2024 Reinforced Conference ==
The 2024 Premier Volleyball League Reinforced Conference was the second conference of the 2024–25 Premier Volleyball League season. It was originally slated to be a merged tournament of the Invitational and Reinforced Conferences, but PVL Commissioner Sherwin Malonzo announced in a simultaneous interview during the commencement of the 2024 PVL Draft Combine that this would be a stand-alone Reinforced tournament and that the Invitational Conference would start in September.

Twelve teams competed in this conference, which have been grouped into two pools. Each team would be allowed to reinforced by one foreign player. Strong Group Athletics changed its name to Zus Coffee Thunderbelles.

=== Participating teams ===
2024 Premier Volleyball League Reinforced Conference
Abbr.	Team	Affiliation	Head coach	Team captain
AKA	Akari Chargers	Akari Lighting & Technology	(Japan) Takayuki Minowa	(Philippines) Michelle Cobb
CAP	Capital1 Solar Spikers	CapitalOne Energy Corp.	(Philippines) Roger Gorayeb	(Philippines) Jorelle Singh
CTC	Chery Tiggo Crossovers	United Asia Automotive Group	(Philippines) Kungfu Reyes	(Philippines) Aby Maraño
CMF	Choco Mucho Flying Titans	Republic Biscuit Corporation	(Philippines) Dante Alinsunurin	(Philippines) Maddie Madayag
CHD	Cignal HD Spikers	Cignal TV, Inc.	(Philippines) Shaq Delos Santos	(Philippines) Frances Molina
CCS	Creamline Cool Smashers	Republic Biscuit Corporation	(Philippines) Sherwin Meneses	(Philippines) Michele Gumabao (interim)
FFF	Farm Fresh Foxies	Farm Fresh Philippine International / Strong Group Athletics	(Japan) Shota Sato	(Philippines) Louie Romero
GTH	Galeries Tower Highrisers	Grand Taipan Land Development	(Philippines) Lerma Giron	(Philippines) Alyssa Eroa
NXL	Nxled Chameleons	Akari Lighting & Technology	(China) Chen Gang	(Philippines) Janel Maraguinot
PGA	Petro Gazz Angels	Petro Gazz Ventures Phils.	(Japan) Koji Tsuzurabara	(Philippines) Mary Remy Joy Palma
HSH	PLDT High Speed Hitters	PLDT Inc.	(Philippines) Rald Ricafort	(Philippines) Kath Arado
ZUS	Zus Coffee Thunderbelles	Zus Coffee / Strong Group Athletics	(Philippines) Jerry Yee	(Philippines) Cloanne Mondoñedo

=== First round ===
==== Pool A ====
Pos	Team	Pld	W	L	Pts	SW	SL	SR	SPW	SPL	SPR	Qualification
1	Creamline Cool Smashers	5	4	1	13	14	6	2.333	484	427	1.133	Pool C
2	PLDT High Speed Hitters	5	4	1	12	14	5	2.800	436	393	1.109	Pool C
3	Chery Tiggo Crossovers	5	4	1	11	13	6	2.167	437	398	1.098	Pool C
4	Farm Fresh Foxies	5	2	3	5	7	11	0.636	410	413	0.993	Pool D
5	Nxled Chameleons	5	1	4	2	3	14	0.214	340	408	0.833	Pool D
6	Galeries Tower Highrisers	5	0	5	2	6	15	0.400	447	514	0.870	Pool D

Source: Premier Volleyball League

==== Pool B ====
Pos	Team	Pld	W	L	Pts	SW	SL	SR	SPW	SPL	SPR	Qualification
1	Akari Chargers	5	5	0	13	15	6	2.500	477	442	1.079	Pool D
2	Cignal HD Spikers	5	4	1	12	13	5	2.600	431	372	1.159	Pool D
3	Capital1 Solar Spikers	5	3	2	8	11	9	1.222	422	427	0.988	Pool D
4	Petro Gazz Angels	5	2	3	7	8	9	0.889	386	380	1.016	Pool C
5	Choco Mucho Flying Titans	5	1	4	5	7	13	0.538	412	427	0.965	Pool C
6	Zus Coffee Thunderbelles	5	0	5	0	3	15	0.200	370	432	0.856	Pool C

Source: Premier Volleyball League

=== Second round ===
==== Pool C ====
Pos	Team	Pld	W	L	Pts	SW	SL	SR	SPW	SPL	SPR	Qualification
1	Creamline Cool Smashers	8	6	2	20	22	10	2.200	744	653	1.139	Quarterfinals
2	PLDT High Speed Hitters	8	6	2	19	22	9	2.444	713	622	1.146	Quarterfinals
3	Chery Tiggo Crossovers	8	5	3	15	18	12	1.500	649	635	1.022	Quarterfinals
4	Petro Gazz Angels	8	5	3	14	17	13	1.308	676	638	1.060	Quarterfinals
5	Choco Mucho Flying Titans	8	2	6	7	11	21	0.524	661	693	0.954	
6	Zus Coffee Thunderbelles	8	0	8	0	3	24	0.125	505	657	0.769	

Source: Premier Volleyball League

==== Pool D ====
Pos	Team	Pld	W	L	Pts	SW	SL	SR	SPW	SPL	SPR	Qualification
1	Akari Chargers	8	8	0	21	24	9	2.667	761	678	1.122	Quarterfinals
2	Cignal HD Spikers	8	7	1	20	22	8	2.750	648	562	1.153	Quarterfinals
3	Capital1 Solar Spikers	8	5	3	13	17	15	1.133	688	677	1.016	Quarterfinals
4	Farm Fresh Foxies	8	3	5	8	11	17	0.647	635	651	0.975	Quarterfinals
5	Nxled Chameleons	8	1	7	3	6	23	0.261	510	609	0.837	
6	Galeries Tower Highrisers	8	0	8	4	11	24	0.458	728	842	0.865	

Source: Premier Volleyball League

=== Final round ===
Quarterfinals
August 24
1 Akari	3
8 Farm Fresh	1
August 27
4 PLDT	3
5 Chery Tiggo	2
August 24
2 Cignal	3
7 Capital1	2
August 27
3 Creamline	3
6 Petro Gazz	0

Semifinals
August 31
Akari	3
PLDT	2
August 31
Cignal	2
Creamline	3

Championship
September 4
Akari	0
Creamline	3
3rd place match
September 4
PLDT	1
Cignal	3

=== Final standings ===
Rank	Team
1st place, gold medalist(s)	Creamline Cool Smashers
2nd place, silver medalist(s)	Akari Chargers
3rd place, bronze medalist(s)	Cignal HD Spikers
4	PLDT High Speed Hitters
5	Chery Tiggo Crossovers
6	Petro Gazz Angels
7	Capital1 Solar Spikers
8	Farm Fresh Foxies
9	Choco Mucho Flying Titans
10	Nxled Chameleons
11	Galeries Tower Highrisers
12	Zus Coffee Thunderbelles

Qualified for the 2024 PVL Invitational Conference
Invited to the 2024 PVL Invitational Conference

=== Awards ===
Award	Player	Team	Ref.
Conference Most Valuable Player	Bernadeth Pons	Creamline	
Finals Most Valuable Player	Bernadeth Pons	Creamline	
Rookie of the Conference	Shayra Ancheta	Zus Coffee	
1st Best Outside Spiker	Brooke Van Sickle	Petro Gazz	
2nd Best Outside Spiker	Grethcel Soltones	Akari	
1st Best Middle Blocker	Mary Joy Baron	PLDT	
2nd Best Middle Blocker	Maria Lourdes Clemente	Capital1	
Best Opposite Spiker	Trisha Gayle Tubu	Farm Fresh	
Best Setter	Angelica Cayuna	Cignal	
Best Libero	Alyssa Eroa	Galeries Tower	
Best Foreign Guest Player	María José Pérez	Cignal	

== 2024 Invitational Conference ==
The 2024 Premier Volleyball League Invitational Conference was the third conference of the 2024–25 Premier Volleyball League season. Unlike the previous iterations of the league, this conference was a short pocket tournament, lasting about nine days, making it the shortest conference in the league. The conference started on September 4, 2024, coinciding with the finals of the 2024 Premier Volleyball League Reinforced Conference.

Originally, the semifinalists of the 2024 Premier Volleyball League Reinforced Conference are qualified and will be able to play alongside two foreign guest teams — the reigning Invitational champions, Kurashiki Ablaze of Japan, and the newcomers, Est Cola of Thailand. But due to players' injuries, the PLDT High Speed Hitters and the Akari Chargers begged off from participation. The Farm Fresh Foxies will be the sole replacement as the other PVL teams declined to join.

=== Participating teams ===
2024 Premier Volleyball League Invitational Conference
Abbr.	Team	Affiliation	Head coach	Team captain
Local teams
CHD	Cignal HD Spikers	Cignal TV, Inc.	(Philippines) Shaq Delos Santos	(Philippines) Frances Molina
CCS	Creamline Cool Smashers	Republic Biscuit Corporation	(Philippines) Sherwin Meneses	(Philippines) Michele Gumabao (interim)
FFF	Farm Fresh Foxies	Farm Fresh Philippine International / Strong Group Athletics	(Japan) Shota Sato	(Philippines) Louie Romero
Foreign guest teams
EST	Est Cola	Sermsuk Public Co. Ltd. / Thailand U20	(Thailand) Wanna Buakaew	(Thailand) Kanokporn Sangthong
KUR	Kurashiki Ablaze	Ablaze Co., Ltd. / V.League (Japan)	(Japan) Hideo Suzuki	(Japan) Saya Taniguchi

=== Preliminary round ===
Pos	Team	Pld	W	L	Pts	SW	SL	SR	SPW	SPL	SPR	Qualification
1	Creamline Cool Smashers	4	4	0	12	12	2	6.000	347	270	1.285	Championship match
2	Cignal HD Spikers	4	3	1	8	10	5	2.000	348	307	1.134	Championship match
3	Kurashiki Ablaze	4	2	2	7	9	7	1.286	373	364	1.025	3rd place match
4	Est Cola	4	1	3	2	4	11	0.364	292	352	0.830	3rd place match
5	Farm Fresh Foxies	4	0	4	1	2	12	0.167	238	333	0.715	

Source: Premier Volleyball League

=== Final round ===
==== 3rd place match ====
Date	Time	Venue		Score		Set 1	Set 2	Set 3	Set 4	Set 5	Total	Report
Sep 12	16:00	SAC	Est Cola	0–3	Kurashiki Ablaze	22–25	24–26	20–25			66–76	P2

==== Championship match ====
Date	Time	Venue		Score		Set 1	Set 2	Set 3	Set 4	Set 5	Total	Report
Sep 12	18:00	SAC	Cignal HD Spikers	2–3	Creamline Cool Smashers	25–21	17–25	25–20	24–26	13–15	104–107	P2

=== Final standing ===
Rank	Team
1st place, gold medalist(s)	Creamline Cool Smashers
2nd place, silver medalist(s)	Cignal HD Spikers
3rd place, bronze medalist(s)	Kurashiki Ablaze
4	Est Cola
5	Farm Fresh Foxies

=== Awards ===
Award	Player	Team	Ref.
Conference Most Valuable Player	(Philippines) Michele Gumabao	Creamline	
Finals Most Valuable Player	(Philippines) Kyle Negrito	Creamline	
1st Best Outside Spiker	(Venezuela) María José Pérez	Cignal	
2nd Best Outside Spiker	(United States) Erica Staunton	Creamline	
1st Best Middle Blocker	(Philippines) Jacqueline Acuña	Cignal	
2nd Best Middle Blocker	(Malaysia) Low Mei Cing	Kurashiki	
Best Opposite Spiker	(Japan) Saya Taniguchi	Kurashiki	
Best Setter	(Philippines) Kyle Negrito	Creamline	
Best Libero	(Thailand) Kalyarat Khamwong	Est Cola	

== 2024–25 All-Filipino Conference ==
The fourth and final conference of the season was the All-Filipino Conference which began on November 9, 2024 and ended on April 12, 2025. With a duration of six months, it is currently the longest conference in league history. The top teams in this conference qualified for the 2025 AVC Women's Volleyball Champions League.

=== Preliminary round ===
Pos	Team	Pld	W	L	Pts	SW	SL	SR	SPW	SPL	SPR	Qualification
1	Creamline Cool Smashers	11	10	1	29	32	8	4.000	970	816	1.189	2025 AVC Women's Champions League and Qualifying round
2	Petro Gazz Angels	11	10	1	29	30	8	3.750	909	770	1.181	2025 AVC Women's Champions League and Qualifying round
3	Cignal HD Spikers	11	8	3	25	27	12	2.250	909	794	1.145	Qualifying round
4	PLDT High Speed Hitters	11	8	3	23	27	13	2.077	927	842	1.101	Qualifying round
5	Choco Mucho Flying Titans	11	8	3	20	27	20	1.350	1064	1031	1.032	Qualifying round
6	Farm Fresh Foxies	11	5	6	15	18	22	0.818	847	915	0.926	Qualifying round
7	Akari Chargers	11	5	6	15	16	22	0.727	844	868	0.972	Qualifying round
8	Chery Tiggo Crossovers	11	5	6	14	20	24	0.833	957	966	0.991	Qualifying round
9	Zus Coffee Thunderbelles	11	4	7	14	20	23	0.870	958	962	0.996	Qualifying round
10	Galeries Tower Highrisers	11	1	10	5	10	30	0.333	835	949	0.880	Qualifying round
11	Capital1 Solar Spikers	11	1	10	5	8	31	0.258	754	926	0.814	Qualifying round
12	Nxled Chameleons	11	1	10	4	9	31	0.290	817	952	0.858	Qualifying round

Source: Premier Volleyball League

=== Final round ===
- All times are Philippine Standard Time (UTC+08:00).

==== Semifinals ====
Pos	Team	Pld	W	L	Pts	SW	SL	SR	SPW	SPL	SPR	Qualification
1	Petro Gazz Angels	3	3	0	9	9	2	4.500	272	232	1.172	Championship
2	Creamline Cool Smashers	3	2	1	6	7	3	2.333	236	201	1.174	Championship
3	Akari Chargers	3	1	2	2	3	8	0.375	224	256	0.875	3rd place
4	Choco Mucho Flying Titans	3	0	3	1	3	9	0.333	241	284	0.849	3rd place

Source: Premier Volleyball League

==== Finals ====
===== 3rd place =====
Date	Time	Venue		Score		Set 1	Set 2	Set 3	Set 4	Set 5	Total	Report
Apr 08	16:00	SAC	Akari Chargers	3–2	Choco Mucho Flying Titans	24–26	21–25	25–15	25–18	15–11	110–95	P2
Apr 10	16:00	SAC	Choco Mucho Flying Titans	3–1	Akari Chargers	25–18	25–22	27–29	25–19		102–88	P2
Apr 12	15:00	PSA	Akari Chargers	3–0	Choco Mucho Flying Titans	25–15	26–24	26–24			77–63	P2

===== Championship =====
Date	Time	Venue		Score		Set 1	Set 2	Set 3	Set 4	Set 5	Total	Report
Apr 08	18:30	SAC	Creamline Cool Smashers	2–3	Petro Gazz Angels	17–25	20–25	25–18	25–20	10–15	97–103	P2
Apr 10	18:30	SAC	Petro Gazz Angels	2–3	Creamline Cool Smashers	15–25	25–16	21–25	25–15	9–15	95–96	P2
Apr 12	19:00	PSA	Creamline Cool Smashers	1–3	Petro Gazz Angels	21–25	16–25	25–23	19–25		81–98	P2

=== Awards ===
Individual awards

Award	Player	Team	Ref.
Conference Most Valuable Player	Brooke Van Sickle	Petro Gazz	
Finals Most Valuable Player	MJ Phillips	Petro Gazz	
Rookie of the Conference	Ishie Lalongisip	Cignal	
1st Best Outside Spiker	Savi Davison	PLDT	
2nd Best Outside Spiker	Bernadeth Pons	Creamline	
1st Best Middle Blocker	Thea Gagate	Zus Coffee	
2nd Best Middle Blocker	Bea De Leon	Creamline	
Best Opposite Spiker	Trisha Tubu	Farm Fresh	
Best Setter	Kyle Negrito	Creamline	
Best Libero	Thang Ponce	Choco Mucho	

== Conference results ==
Conference	Champion	Runner-up	3rd	4th	5th	6th	7th	8th	9th	10th	11th	12th
2024 All-Filipino	Creamline	Choco Mucho	Petro Gazz	Chery Tiggo	PLDT	Cignal	Akari	Nxled	Farm Fresh	Galeries Towers	Capital1	Strong Group
2024 Reinforced	Creamline	Akari	Cignal	PLDT	Chery Tiggo	Petro Gazz	Capital1	Farm Fresh	Choco Mucho	Nxled	Galeries Towers	Zus Coffee
2024 Invitational	Creamline	Cignal	Kurashiki	Est; Cola	Farm Fresh	—N/a						
2024–25 All-Filipino	Petro Gazz	Creamline	Akari	Choco Mucho	PLDT	Chery Tiggo	Zus Coffee	Galeries Towers	Cignal	Farm Fresh	Capital1	Nxled
