= 2025–26 Premier Volleyball League season =

Eighth season of the Premier Volleyball League

- League: Premier Volleyball League
- Sport: Volleyball
- Duration: June 22, 2025 – April 23, 2026
- TV partners: One Sports; Cignal TV
- Streaming partner: Pilipinas Live

Rookie Draft
- Top draft pick: Bella Belen
- Picked by: Capital1

Conferences
- Invitational (Note: Preceded by the 2025 PVL on Tour, a distinct "preseason tournament".) champions: PLDT
- Invitational runners-up: Kobe Shinwa
- Reinforced champions: Petro Gazz
- Reinforced runners-up: Zus Coffee
- All-Filipino champions: Creamline
- All-Filipino runners-up: Cignal

PVL seasons
- ← 2024–25 2026–27 →

The 2025–26 Premier Volleyball League (PVL) season was the ninth season of the Premier Volleyball League. The season began with a preseason tournament, the PVL on Tour, on June 22, 2025, followed directly by the Invitational Conference, the first regular conference of the season. The season ended with the All-Filipino Conference on April 23, 2026. The 2026 Volleyball All-Star Showcase was held in Candon, Ilocos Sur on May 1, its first all-star match since 2019.

This is the first season to be integrated with the league's new calendar, which lasts from June to May, in order to align with the FIVB calendar. A season break was held in between the Invitational Conference and Reinforced Conference, which is held to accommodate the Philippines' hosting of the 2025 FIVB Men's Volleyball World Championship.

This is also the last season for the Chery Tiggo Crossovers, Petro Gazz Angels, and Cignal HD/Super Spikers, who all left during or after this season.

== Teams ==
- The Chery Tiggo Crossovers renamed as the Chery Tiggo EV Crossovers ahead of the Reinforced Conference.
- The Cignal HD Spikers also renamed as the Cignal Super Spikers ahead of the Reinforced Conference.

2025–26 Premier Volleyball League season teams
Abbr.	Team	Affiliation	Head coach	Team captain
AKA	Akari Chargers	Akari Lighting & Technology	(Philippines) Tina Salak	Justine Jazareno
CAP	Capital1 Solar Spikers	CapitalOne Energy Corp.	(Brazil) Jorge de Brito	Roma Doromal
CMF	Choco Mucho Flying Titans	Republic Biscuit Corporation	(Philippines) Dante Alinsunurin	Desiree Cheng
CSS	Cignal Super Spikers	Cignal TV, Inc.	(Philippines) Shaq Delos Santos	Gel Cayuna
CCS	Creamline Cool Smashers	Republic Biscuit Corporation	(Philippines) Sherwin Meneses	Alyssa Valdez
FFF	Farm Fresh Foxies	Farm Fresh Philippine International / Strong Group Athletics	(Japan) Koji Tsuzurabara	Louie Romero
GTH	Galeries Tower Highrisers	Grand Taipan Land Development	(Philippines) Aying Esteban	Julia Coronel
NXL	Nxled Chameleons	Akari Lighting & Technology	(Italy) Ettore Guidetti	Brooke Van Sickle
HSH	PLDT High Speed Hitters	PLDT Inc.	(Philippines) Rald Ricafort	Kath Arado
ZUS	Zus Coffee Thunderbelles	Zuspresso Sdn. Bhd. / Strong Group Athletics	(Philippines) Jerry Yee	Cloanne Mondoñedo

=== Mid-season departures ===
Abbr.	Team	Affiliation	Last conference
CTC	Chery Tiggo EV Crossovers	United Asia Automotive Group	2025 Reinforced
PGA	Petro Gazz Angels	PetroGazz Ventures Phils.	2025 Reinforced

== Transactions ==
=== Coaching changes ===
Team	Outgoing	Incoming
Farm Fresh Foxies	(Italy) Alessandro Lodi	(Japan) Koji Tsuzurabara
Galeries Tower Highrisers	(Kenya) Godfrey Okumu	(Philippines) Clarence Esteban

- On December 4, 2025, Alessandro Lodi stepped down as Farm Fresh Foxies head coach.
- On January 8, 2026, Clarence Esteban was appointed as Galeries Tower Highrisers head coach, replacing Godfrey Okumu.
- On January 9, 2026, Koji Tsuzurabara was appointed by Strong Group Athletics as a head coach. On the same day, he was assigned to the Farm Fresh Foxies, replacing Alessandro Lodi.

=== Retirement ===
- On November 18, 2025, May Luna-Lumahan announced her retirement from professional volleyball. Since joining the PVL in 2021, she played for the Cignal HD Spikers, Chery Tiggo Crossovers, Foton Tornadoes and Nxled Chameleons.
- On January 8, 2026, Rhea Dimaculangan-Villarete announced her retirement from professional volleyball. Since joining the PVL in 2021, she played for the PLDT High Speed Hitters and Creamline Cool Smashers.

=== Notable moves ===
- On December 2, 2025, all Chery Tiggo EV Crossovers players were released following the team's disbandment.
- On January 1, 2026, Eya Laure returned to the league after over a year. She signed with the Choco Mucho Flying Titans.
- On January 4, 2026, Chie Saet left the Petro Gazz Angels after a seven-year stint with the team after signing with the Strong Group Athletics organization. She will be assigned to one of the organization's teams.
- On January 5, 2026, Petro Gazz captain Remy Palma left the team after four years after signing with Strong Group Athletics. She will also become the assistant coach for whichever team she is assigned to.
- On January 9, 2026, the Galeries Tower Highrisers released a majority of its roster and coaching staff as part of the team's rebuild.
- On January 10, 2026, all Petro Gazz Angels players were released as the team took a leave of absence.
- On January 13, 2026, former Chery Tiggo captain Aby Maraño signed with the Nxled Chameleons.
- On January 15, 2026, former Petro Gazz star players Brooke Van Sickle, MJ Phillips, and Myla Pablo all signed with Nxled.
- On January 26, 2026, Rachel Daquis left the Farm Fresh Foxies after a one-year stint with the team after signing with the Foxies sister team Zus Coffee Thunderbelles. Daquis' signing with the Thunderbelles also set the stage for the long-awaited reunion of the celebrated "GonzaQuis" duo with Zus Coffee mainstay Jovelyn Gonzaga.

== Draft ==
The 2025 Premier Volleyball League draft was held on June 8, 2025, at Novotel Manila Araneta City in Quezon City. The first pick was made by the Capital1 Solar Spikers.

== PVL on Tour ==
The league held a "preseason" tournament to make way for the Philippines' hosting of the 2025 FIVB Men's Volleyball World Championship. That conference was the PVL on Tour, based on the league's out-of-town series of the same name, which began on June 22, 2025 and ended on August 17. The tournament also doubled as a qualifier for the Invitational Conference.

=== Preliminary round ===
==== Pool A ====
Pos	Team	Pld	W	L	Pts	SW	SL	SR	SPW	SPL	SPR	Qualification
1	PLDT High Speed Hitters	5	5	0	15	15	1	15.000	400	298	1.342	Final round
2	Nxled Chameleons	5	4	1	11	12	6	2.000	408	381	1.071	Final round
3	Farm Fresh Foxies	5	3	2	9	9	7	1.286	359	371	0.968	Knockout round
4	Petro Gazz Angels	5	2	3	7	8	10	0.800	390	406	0.961	Knockout round
5	Choco Mucho Flying Titans	5	1	4	3	7	13	0.538	439	481	0.913	Knockout round
6	Galeries Tower Highrisers	5	0	5	0	1	15	0.067	335	386	0.868	Knockout round

Source: PVL.ph

==== Pool B ====
Pos	Team	Pld	W	L	Pts	SW	SL	SR	SPW	SPL	SPR	Qualification
1	Cignal HD Spikers	5	4	1	12	13	4	3.250	395	366	1.079	Final round
2	Creamline Cool Smashers	5	3	2	10	11	8	1.375	441	394	1.119	Final round
3	Chery Tiggo Crossovers	5	3	2	9	12	10	1.200	488	451	1.082	Knockout round
4	Zus Coffee Thunderbelles	5	3	2	7	12	12	1.000	512	503	1.018	Knockout round
5	Akari Chargers	5	2	3	6	9	11	0.818	420	460	0.913	Knockout round
6	Capital1 Solar Spikers	5	0	5	1	3	15	0.200	353	432	0.817	Knockout round

Source: PVL.ph

=== Knockout round ===
Date	Time	Venue		Score		Set 1	Set 2	Set 3	Set 4	Set 5	Total	Report
Aug 02	16:00	COD	Farm Fresh Foxies	3–0	Capital1 Solar Spikers	25–20	25–15	25–21			75–56	P2
Aug 02	18:30	COD	Chery Tiggo Crossovers	3–0	Galeries Tower Highrisers	25–23	25–22	25–21			75–66	P2
Aug 05	16:00	PSA	Petro Gazz Angels	0–3	Akari Chargers	30–32	22–25	19–25			71–82	P2
Aug 05	18:30	PSA	Zus Coffee Thunderbelles	3–2	Choco Mucho Flying Titans	22–25	20–25	25–16	25–17	15–10	107–93	P2

=== Final round ===
- All times are Philippine Standard Time (UTC+08:00).

==== Bracket ====
Quarterfinals
August 7
1 PLDT	3
8 Zus Coffee	0
August 9
4 Creamline	3
5 Farm Fresh	0
August 7
2 Cignal	3
7 Akari	0
August 9
3 Nxled	0
6 Chery Tiggo	3

Semifinals
August 12
PLDT	3
Creamline	2
August 12
Cignal	1
Chery Tiggo	3

Championship
August 17
PLDT	3
Chery Tiggo	2
3rd place match
August 17
Creamline	3
Cignal	0

==== Quarterfinals ====
Date	Time	Venue		Score		Set 1	Set 2	Set 3	Set 4	Set 5	Total	Report
Aug 07	16:00	PSA	Cignal HD Spikers	3–0	Akari Chargers	25–20	25–11	28–26			78–57	P2
Aug 07	18:30	PSA	PLDT High Speed Hitters	3–0	Zus Coffee Thunderbelles	25–21	25–21	25–19			75–61	P2
Aug 09	16:00	PSA	Nxled Chameleons	0–3	Chery Tiggo Crossovers	17–25	15–25	20–25			52–75	P2
Aug 09	18:30	PSA	Creamline Cool Smashers	3–0	Farm Fresh Foxies	25–19	25–19	26–24			76–62	P2

==== Semifinals ====
Date	Time	Venue		Score		Set 1	Set 2	Set 3	Set 4	Set 5	Total	Report
Aug 12	16:00	SAC	Chery Tiggo Crossovers	3–1	Cignal HD Spikers	25–17	16–25	25–21	25–23		91–86	P2
Aug 12	18:30	SAC	Creamline Cool Smashers	2–3	PLDT High Speed Hitters	25–27	25–22	25–19	16–25	10–15	101–108	P2

==== Third place ====
Date	Time	Venue		Score		Set 1	Set 2	Set 3	Set 4	Set 5	Total	Report
Aug 17	16:00	MOA	Creamline Cool Smashers	3–0	Cignal HD Spikers	25–17	29–27	25–17			79–61	P2

==== Championship ====
Date	Time	Venue		Score		Set 1	Set 2	Set 3	Set 4	Set 5	Total	Report
Aug 17	18:30	MOA	PLDT High Speed Hitters	3–2	Chery Tiggo Crossovers	25–17	25–17	19–25	24–26	15–8	108–93	P2

=== Awards ===
Individual awards

Award	Player	Team	Ref.
Conference Most Valuable Player	Erika Santos	Cignal	
Finals Most Valuable Player	Mika Reyes	PLDT	
1st Best Outside Spiker	Alyssa Valdez	Creamline	
2nd Best Outside Spiker	Myla Pablo	Petro Gazz	
1st Best Middle Blocker	Jeanette Panaga	Creamline	
2nd Best Middle Blocker	Majoy Baron	PLDT	
Best Opposite Spiker	Trisha Tubu	Farm Fresh	
Best Setter	Kyle Negrito	Creamline	
Best Libero	Kath Arado	PLDT	

== Invitational Conference ==
The second conference of the season was the Invitational Conference which began on August 21, 2025 and ended on August 31.

=== Preliminary round ===
Pos	Team	Pld	W	L	Pts	SW	SL	SR	SPW	SPL	SPR	Qualification
1	PLDT High Speed Hitters	5	5	0	14	15	3	5.000	434	344	1.262	Championship match
2	Kobe Shinwa University	5	4	1	11	12	7	1.714	442	402	1.100	Championship match
3	Chery Tiggo Crossovers	5	3	2	9	11	9	1.222	430	425	1.012	3rd place match
4	Creamline Cool Smashers	5	2	3	7	11	11	1.000	482	460	1.048	3rd place match
5	Cignal HD Spikers	5	1	4	4	7	13	0.538	398	433	0.919	
6	Zus Coffee Thunderbelles	5	0	5	0	2	15	0.133	303	423	0.716	

Source: Premier Volleyball League

==== Final round ====
- All times are Philippine Standard Time (UTC+08:00).

==== 3rd place match ====
Date	Time	Venue		Score		Set 1	Set 2	Set 3	Set 4	Set 5	Total	Report
Aug 31	16:00	SAC	Chery Tiggo Crossovers	0–3	Creamline Cool Smashers	15–25	13–25	22–25			50–75	P2

==== Championship match ====
Date	Time	Venue		Score		Set 1	Set 2	Set 3	Set 4	Set 5	Total	Report
Aug 31	18:30	SAC	PLDT High Speed Hitters	3–1	Kobe Shinwa University	21–25	31–29	25–22	25–18		102–94	P2

=== Awards ===
Award	Player	Team	Ref.
Conference Most Valuable Player	Savi Davison	PLDT	
Finals Most Valuable Player	Kath Arado	PLDT	
1st Best Outside Hitter	Jema Galanza	Creamline	
2nd Best Outside Hitter	Nagisa Komatsuda	Kobe Shinwa	
1st Best Middle Blocker	Jeanette Panaga	Creamline	
2nd Best Middle Blocker	Rizza Nogales	Zus Coffee	
Best Opposite Hitter	Ara Galang	Chery Tiggo	
Best Setter	Sakura Furuta	Kobe Shinwa	
Best Libero	Kath Arado	PLDT	

== Reinforced Conference ==
The third conference of the season is the Reinforced Conference which began on October 7, 2025 and is set to end on November 30.

=== Preliminary round ===
Pos	Team	Pld	W	L	Pts	SW	SL	SR	SPW	SPL	SPR	Qualification
1	Farm Fresh Foxies	8	7	1	21	22	7	3.143	694	618	1.123	Quarterfinals
2	Zus Coffee Thunderbelles	8	7	1	20	21	8	2.625	688	596	1.154	Quarterfinals
3	PLDT High Speed Hitters	8	6	2	18	19	9	2.111	669	591	1.132	Quarterfinals
4	Creamline Cool Smashers	8	5	3	17	20	12	1.667	729	661	1.103	Quarterfinals
5	Petro Gazz Angels	8	5	3	14	17	14	1.214	718	669	1.073	Quarterfinals
6	Cignal Super Spikers	8	5	3	13	16	14	1.143	672	650	1.034	Quarterfinals
7	Capital1 Solar Spikers	8	4	4	13	16	14	1.143	660	688	0.959	Quarterfinals
8	Akari Chargers	8	4	4	12	18	16	1.125	749	731	1.025	Quarterfinals
9	Choco Mucho Flying Titans	8	3	5	9	11	17	0.647	621	660	0.941	
10	Chery Tiggo EV Crossovers	8	2	6	6	12	20	0.600	673	724	0.930	
11	Nxled Chameleons	8	0	8	1	5	24	0.208	576	701	0.822	
12	Galeries Tower Highrisers	8	0	8	0	2	24	0.083	465	635	0.732	

Source: Premier Volleyball League

=== Final round ===
Quarterfinals
November 24
Farm Fresh	0
Akari	3
November 24
Creamline	1
Petro Gazz	3
November 24
Zus Coffee	3
Capital1	0
November 24
PLDT	3
Cignal	1

Semifinals
November 27
Akari	2
Petro Gazz	3
November 27
Zus Coffee	3
PLDT	0

Championship
November 30
Petro Gazz	3
Zus Coffee	1
3rd-place match
November 30
Akari	3
PLDT	2

== All-Filipino Conference ==
The fourth and final conference of the season will be the All-Filipino Conference which began on January 31, 2026.

=== Preliminary round ===
Pos	Team	Pld	W	L	Pts	SW	SL	SR	SPW	SPL	SPR	Qualification
1	PLDT High Speed Hitters	9	7	2	20	22	11	2.000	769	698	1.102	Qualifying round
2	Cignal Super Spikers	9	6	3	20	22	11	2.000	772	687	1.124	Qualifying round
3	Creamline Cool Smashers	9	6	3	16	20	16	1.250	700	662	1.057	Qualifying round
4	Farm Fresh Foxies	9	5	4	17	22	16	1.375	850	771	1.102	Qualifying round
5	Nxled Chameleons	9	5	4	15	20	16	1.250	810	773	1.048	Play-in tournament semifinals
6	Akari Chargers	9	5	4	15	19	18	1.056	792	838	0.945	Play-in tournament semifinals
7	Choco Mucho Flying Titans	9	4	5	13	19	19	1.000	828	826	1.002	Play-in tournament quarterfinals
8	Capital1 Solar Spikers	9	4	5	10	14	21	0.667	748	796	0.940	Play-in tournament quarterfinals
9	Galeries Tower Highrisers	9	2	7	6	11	24	0.458	707	800	0.884	Play-in tournament quarterfinals
10	Zus Coffee Thunderbelles	9	1	8	3	9	26	0.346	693	819	0.846	Play-in tournament quarterfinals

Source: Premier Volleyball League

== All-Star Game ==
The league hosted an all-star game on May 1 after the All-Filipino Conference, their first since 2019. The event will be part of the greater 2026 Volleyball All-Star Showcase in Candon, Ilocos Sur, which the league will co-host together with Spikers' Turf.

== Conference results ==
Conference	Champion	Runner-up	3rd	4th	5th	6th	7th	8th	9th	10th	11th	12th
PVL on Tour (Note: Billed as a "pre-season tournament")	PLDT	Chery Tiggo	Creamline	Cignal	Nxled	Farm Fresh	Zus Coffee	Akari	Petro Gazz	Choco Mucho	Capital1	Galeries Towers
Invitational	PLDT	Kobe Shinwa	Creamline	Chery Tiggo	Cignal	Zus Coffee	—N/a					
Reinforced	Petro Gazz	Zus Coffee	Akari	PLDT	Farm Fresh	Creamline	Cignal	Capital1	Choco Mucho	Chery Tiggo	Nxled	Galeries Towers
All-Filipino	Creamline	Cignal	PLDT	Farm Fresh	Nxled	Akari	Choco Mucho	Galeries Tower	Capital1	Zus Coffee	—N/a	
