= Zus Coffee Thunderbelles =

Filipino women's volleyball team

- 2026–27 Zus Coffee Thunderbelles season
- Short name: Zus Coffee
- Nickname: Thunderbelles
- Founded: 2024
- History: Strong Group Athletics; 2024; Zus Coffee Thunderbelles; 2024–present
- Owner: Strong Group Athletics
- Head coach: Jerry Yee
- Captain: Cloanne Mondoñedo
- League: Premier Volleyball League
- 2026 All-Filipino: 10th place

The Zus Coffee Thunderbelles (stylized as ZUS Coffee) are a professional women's volleyball team in the Philippines competing in the Premier Volleyball League (PVL). The team is owned by Strong Group Athletics, founded by Frank Lao, who has a stake in the Malaysian-based coffee chain Zus Coffee.

The team made their team debut in the 2024 PVL All-Filipino Conference under the name Strong Group Athletics following the organization's take over of the Quezon City Gerflor Defenders franchise. The Thunderbelles are one of two teams owned by SGA, the other being the Farm Fresh Foxies.

== History ==
=== Background ===
During the 2023 Premier Volleyball League Invitational Conference, the Quezon City Gerflor Defenders were put under investigation by the league due to financial issues. The roster's unpaid salaries were eventually settled by Strong Group Athletics, backers of the Farm Fresh Foxies. On January 13, 2024, it was announced that the organization would take over the Gerflor franchise beginning with the 2024 Premier Volleyball League season, and were established as the organization's second team after Farm Fresh. The day after, SGA founder Frank Lao announced that the team will be named Strong Group Athletics, following the success of the eponymous basketball team.

=== First seasons ===
They made their PVL debut at the 2024 All-Filipino Conference, with Rogelio Getigan named as the team's first head coach.

In May 27, 2024, the team announced that it would rebrand to the Zus Coffee Thunderbelles following Strong Group Athletics' partnership with Zus Coffee, a Malaysian coffee brand in which Lao has a stake in. They also announced that Jerry Yee, head coach of the Benilde Lady Blazers volleyball team, would succeed Getigan as head coach beginning with the 2024 Reinforced conference. On June 24, Zus Coffee won the first overall pick in the inaugural PVL draft lottery, which they used to select Thea Gagate during the 2024 Premier Volleyball League draft.

In the 2024–25 All-Filipino Conference, the Thunderbelles reached the quarterfinals for the first time. The team won the first match of the best-of-three series against the Petro Gazz Angels, but lost the next two and were eliminated. Zus Coffee reached their first ever PVL finals at the 2025 Reinforced Conference. They lost the bid for a tournament title against the Petro Gazz Angels.

== Names ==
- Strong Group Athletics (2024 All-Filipino)
- Zus Coffee Thunderbelles (2024 Reinforced–present)

== Current roster ==
Zus Coffee Thunderbelles roster
No.	Nat.	Player	Pos.	Height	DOB	From
1	(Philippines)	Mycah Go	Libero	1.70 m (5 ft 7 in)	April 15, 2002 (age 24)	St. Benilde
2	(Philippines)	Chenae Basarte	Setter	1.70 m (5 ft 7 in)	December 9, 2001 (age 24)	St. Benilde
5	(Philippines)	Glaudine Troncoso	Opposite Hitter	1.77 m (5 ft 10 in)	October 13, 1997 (age 28)	Central Philippine
7	(Philippines)	Cess Robles	Outside Hitter	1.60 m (5 ft 3 in)	June 7, 1997 (age 29)	National-U
8	(Philippines)	Jovelyn Gonzaga	Opposite Hitter	1.73 m (5 ft 8 in)	October 31, 1991 (age 34)	Central Philippine
9	(Philippines)	Kate Santiago	Outside Hitter	1.70 m (5 ft 7 in)	January 26, 2002 (age 24)	Adamson
10	(Philippines)	Chinnie Arroyo	Outside Hitter	1.72 m (5 ft 8 in)	May 19, 2001 (age 25)	National-U
11	(Philippines)	Wielyn Estoque	Outside Hitter	1.72 m (5 ft 8 in)	April 8, 2001 (age 25)	St. Benilde
12	(Philippines)	Zam Nolasco	Middle Blocker	1.85 m (6 ft 1 in)	April 30, 2004 (age 22)	St. Benilde
13	(Philippines)	Rachel Daquis	Outside Hitter	1.77 m (5 ft 10 in)	December 13, 1987 (age 38)	Far Eastern
14	(Philippines)	Alyanna Ong	Middle Blocker	1.73 m (5 ft 8 in)	February 22, 2003 (age 23)	Mapúa
15	(Philippines)	AC Miner	Opposite Hitter	1.80 m (5 ft 11 in)	January 21, 2003 (age 23)	Ateneo
16	(Philippines)	Alyssa Eroa	Libero	1.50 m (4 ft 11 in)	September 6, 1996 (age 30)	San Sebastian
17	(Philippines)	Fiola Ceballos	Outside Hitter	1.70 m (5 ft 7 in)	June 21, 1994 (age 32)	Central Philippine
18	(Philippines)	Jolina Dela Cruz	Outside Hitter	1.75 m (5 ft 9 in)	September 5, 1999 (age 27)	De La Salle
19	(Philippines)	Riza Nogales	Middle Blocker	1.63 m (5 ft 4 in)	December 3, 2002 (age 23)	UE
21	(Philippines)	Cloanne Mondoñedo (C)	Setter	1.68 m (5 ft 6 in)	November 16, 2000 (age 25)	St. Benilde
24	(Philippines)	Chie Saet	Setter	1.64 m (5 ft 5 in)	November 24, 1984 (age 41)	De La Salle
25	(Philippines)	Karen Verdeflor	Libero	1.55 m (5 ft 1 in)	September 24, 2000 (age 26)	Adamson
Updated as of: September 18, 2026 | Source: PVL.ph

Coaching staff

- Head coach:
  Jerry Yee
- Assistant coaches:
  Rogelio Getigan
  Justine Dorog
  Mark Santos
  Kirk Beliran
- Statistician:
  Abigail Magatoc
- Strength & conditioning coach:
  Paul Ericta & Jimbo Arceo

Team staff

- Team manager:
  Jacob Lao
- Team coordinator:
  Gizelle Sy

Medical staff

- Physiotherapist:
  Juana Roxas

== Season-by-season records ==
Season	Conference	Preliminary round	Final round	Ranking	Source
2024–25 (team)	All-Filipino	12th (0–11, 0 pts)	Did not qualify	12th place	
2024–25 (team)	Reinforced	12th (0–8, 0 pts)	Did not qualify	12th place	
2024–25 (team)	Invitational	Did not qualify			
2024–25 (team)	All-Filipino	9th (4–7, 14 pts)	Lost in quarterfinals vs. Petro Gazz, 1–2 (Note: Best-of-three series.)	7th place	
2025–26 (team)	PVL on Tour	5th (2–3, 7 pts) (Pool A)	Lost in quarterfinals vs. PLDT, 0–3	7th place	
2025–26 (team)	Invitational (Note: Despite not qualifying initially, Zus Coffee accepted the invitation to join the 2025 Invitational Conference.)	6th (0–5, 0 pts)	Did not qualify	6th place	
2025–26 (team)	Reinforced	2nd (7–1, 20 pts)	Won in quarterfinals vs. Capital1, 3–0; Won in semifinals vs. PLDT, 3–0; Lost in championship vs. Petro Gazz, 1–3	Runner-up	
2025–26 (team)	All-Filipino	10th (1–8, 3 pts)	Lost in Play-in quarterfinal (Pool B) vs. Choco Mucho, 2–3	10th place	
2026–27 (team)	Invitational	Did not qualify			

== Individual awards ==
PVLPC Rookie of the Year

- Thea Gagate – 2025

Best Setter

- Cloanne Mondoñedo – 2025 Reinforced

Rookie of the Conference

- Shayra Ancheta – 2024 Reinforced
- AC Miner – 2025 Reinforced

1st Best Middle Blocker

- Thea Gagate – 2024–25 All-Filipino

2nd Best Middle Blocker

- Rizza Nogales — 2025 Invitational, 2026 All-Filipino

Best Foreign Guest Player

- (United States) Anna DeBeer — 2025 Reinforced

== Team captains ==
- (Philippines) Dolly Verzosa (2024)
- (Philippines) Cloanne Mondoñedo (2024–present)

== Head coach ==
- (Philippines) Rogelio Getigan (2024)
- (Philippines) Jerry Yee (2024–present)

== Former players ==
- Caroline Santos
- Danivah Aying (2024)
- Dolly Versoza (2024-2025)
- Gayle Pascual (2024-2025)
- Jade Gentapa (2025–2026)
- Jenina Zeta (2024)
- Julia Angeles (2024-2025)
- Maika Ortiz (2025–2026)
- Michelle Gamit (2024)
- Nikka Yandoc (2024)
- Renee Mabilangan
- Renee Penafiel (2025-2026)
- Shayra Ancheta (2024-2025)

== Draft history ==
Season	Pick No.	Name
2024	1	Thea Gagate
2024	13	Shayra Ancheta
2024	19	Nikka Yandoc
2024	22	Jenina Zeta
2025	5	AC Miner
2025	17	Mycah Go
2025	25	Riza Nogales
2025	28	Angela Jackson
2026	4	Alyanna Ong

== Imports ==
- (Japan) Asaka Tamaru (2024)
- (United States) Anna DeBeer (2025)
