= Riza Nogales =

Filipino volleyball player

Personal information
- Nationality: Filipino
- Born: December 30, 2002 (age 23); Calamba, Laguna, Philippines
- Height: 1.83 m (6 ft 0 in)
- Education: University of the East

Volleyball information
- Position: Middle blocker
- Current team: Zus Coffee Thunderbelles
- Number: 19

Career
Years	Teams
2025–present	Zus Coffee Thunderbelles

Riza Nogales (born December 30, 2002) is a Filipino professional volleyball player who plays as a middle blocker for the Zus Coffee Thunderbelles of the Premier Volleyball League (PVL). In college, she played for the UE Lady Red Warriors.

== Early life and education ==
Nogales was born on December 30, 2002, in Calamba, Laguna, Philippines. She first took up volleyball when she was seventh grade. She represented Sorsogon in the Palarong Bicol until twelfth grade. She attended the University of the East (UE).

== Career ==
=== Collegiate ===
Nogales played for the UE Lady Warriors in the University Athletic Association of the Philippines (UAAP).

She played her last playing year in the UAAP in Season 87 in 2025, where they struggled reaching the final four. She was still able to play for Season 88 but forego her final year of eligibility to turn professional.

=== Club ===
Nogales was the 25th overall pick in the 2025 Premier Volleyball League draft joining the Zus Coffee Thunderbelles and has played with them in the 2025 Premier Volleyball League on Tour as a middle blocker.

== Awards ==
=== Individual ===
Year	Conference	Title	Ref
2023	V-League; Collegiate	2nd Best Middle Blocker	
2025	PVL; Invitational	2nd Best Middle Blocker	
2026	PVL; All-Filipino	2nd Best Middle Blocker	

=== Collegiate ===
Year	League	Season	Title	Ref
2023	V-League	Collegiate	3rd place	
2024	V-League	Collegiate	3rd place	

=== Clubs ===
Year	Season/Conference	Club	Title	Ref
2025	Reinforced	Zus Coffee Thunderbelles	Runner-up	
