= 2025 Premier Volleyball League draft =

Second edition of the PVL draft

2025 Premier Volleyball League Rookie Draft

General information
- Sport: Volleyball
- Date: June 8, 2025
- Location: Novotel Manila Araneta City, Quezon City
- Network: One Sports

Overview
- 29 total selections in 4 rounds
- League: Premier Volleyball League
- Teams: 12
- First selection: Bella Belen (Capital1 Solar Spikers)
- Most selections (4): Zus Coffee Thunderbelles; Chery Tiggo Crossovers

The 2025 Premier Volleyball League draft was the second rookie draft for the Premier Volleyball League, the top-level women's professional volleyball league in the Philippines, conducted on June 8, 2025. The draft was held before the start of the 2025–26 season.

== Key dates ==
Table of key dates
Event	Date(s)
Submission of applicants' draft requirements.	April 21–May 23, 2025
Draft lottery day.	May 26, 2025
Rookie draft combine	May 30–31, 2025
Announcement of the list of applicants.	June 4, 2025
PVL Rookie Draft event.	June 8, 2025

== Eligibility and entrants ==
The following were the eligibility requirements for the draft:

- Female at birth, as indicated in a Philippine Statistics Authority-issued birth certificate
- At least 21 years old on or before December 31, 2025
- Those below 21 years old must be college graduates.
- Filipino-foreign applicants must be holders of a Philippine passport or has a receipt indicating her passport's release before the deadline date.
- Players who played for collegiate teams in the Philippines but not in the UAAP or NCAA should have an endorsement letter from her collegiate coach or athletic director.
- Non UAAP or NCAA players should secure an endorsement letter from a current registered PVL, UAAP or NCAA coach.
- Medical clearance and a notarized declaration of no-pending obligations from a collegiate or club

=== Draft entrants ===
The initial list has 60 players enter the draft with 57 entrants confirmed. Rose Pinuela at 39-years old is the oldest applicant, Angela Jackson at 20-years old is the youngest.

==== UAAP players ====
- Pia Abbu – MB, University of Santo Tomas
- Jean Asis – MB, Far Eastern University
- Bella Belen – OH, National University
- Nica Celis – MB, University of the Philippines
- Lyann De Guzman – OH, Ateneo de Manila University
- Ayesha Juegos – OP, Adamson University
- Alleiah Malaluan – OH, De La Salle University
- Aliah Marce – OH, Adamson University
- Alexis Miner – MB/OP, Ateneo de Manila University
- Ann Monares – L, Far Eastern University
- Riza Nogales – MB, University of the East
- May Ann Nuique – MB/OP, Adamson University
- Jessa Ordiales – MB, De La Salle University
- Erin Pangilinan – MB, National University
- Baby Jyne Soreño – OP, De La Salle University
- Chenie Tagaod – OH, Far Eastern University
- Julyana Tolentino – S, De La Salle University
- Sheena Toring – MB, National University
- Kylene Villegas – MB, Adamson University

==== UAAP training pool and former players ====
- Angela Jackson – OH, University of Santo Tomas
- Lyka Bautista, Far Eastern University
- Jules Lopeña – L, Adamson University
- Renee Penafiel – OH, University of Santo Tomas
- May Roque – OH, Adamson University
- Pearl Ann Denura – L, National University
- Jerrymie Ann Turaray, National University

==== NCAA players ====
- Kristine Adante – S, Arellano University
- Maliey Amante – MB, José Rizal University
- Winnie Bedaña – MB, University of Perpetual Help System DALTA
- Reyann Cañete – OP, San Beda University
- Cherry Mae Cuenca – L, Arellano University
- Zonxi Jane Dahab – MB, Lyceum of the Philippines University
- Von Dimaculangan – S, San Sebastian College – Recoletos
- Joan Doguna – OH, Lyceum of the Philippines University
- Jhan Pauline Fortuno – L, Emilio Aguinaldo College
- Jan Gregorio – L, San Beda University
- Pauline De Guzman – OP, Arellano University
- Mycah Go – OH, De La Salle–College of Saint Benilde
- Karyla Jasareno – OH, José Rizal University
- Jerry Lyn Laurente – S, José Rizal University
- Angelique Ledesma – MB, Colegio de San Juan de Letran
- Lea Tapang – OH, Colegio de San Juan de Letran
- Jamaica Villena – MB, Emilio Aguinaldo College

==== Non-UAAP/NCAA players ====
- Ivy Aquino, Asian Institute of Maritime Studies
- Shane Carmona, Enderun Colleges
- Erika Deloria, Enderun Colleges
- Eika Bucog, Lyceum of the Philippines University – Batangas
- Zenneth Perolino, Enderun Colleges
- Rose Joy Pinuela, Olivarez College
- Alohi Robins-Hardy – S, Farm Fresh Foxies (Note: The Farm Fresh Foxies have already signed in Robins-Hardy in November 2024. However she has never played in the PVL since 2021, when the league became professional and thus will have to undergo a draft in order to be eligible to play games for the team.)
- Roxanne Tan, University of San Jose–Recoletos
- Gerlie Trilles, CIT Colleges of Paniqui Foundation

==== Foreign-based Filipino players ====
- Tia Andaya – S, Central Washington University (United States)
- Reinali Calisin, Lawrence Technological University (United States)
- Clara Serrano, Olds College (Canada)
- Divine Cortez, University of Saskatchewan (Canada)
- Yveian Orpiano, Concordia University of Edmonton (Canada)

==== Denied applicants ====
The following players' application were denied due to failing to meet documentary requirements.

- Ezriah Martinez, University of the Cordilleras
- Nenita Padua – OH, Arellano University
- Mary Ann Rioflorido Toronto Metropolitan University (Canada)

== Combine ==
The Rookie Draft Combine was held at the Paco Arena in Manila from May 30 to 31 Attendance is required by default for draft entrants without a valid excuse. Eight players were absent in the first day.

== Draft order ==
In the first round, the order of the four worst-performing teams will be determined through a lottery, based on the ability to pick the first to fourth picks. This practice was designed to discourage any tanking by teams to influence the pick order in potential future drafts. The draft will conclude when all 12 teams have passed the draft selection. For this year's draft, the basis of the draft order is the combined results of the 2024 Premier Volleyball League Reinforced Conference (1/3 of the computation), and the 2024–25 Premier Volleyball League All-Filipino Conference (2/3 of the computation). The four worst combined records will participate in the lottery to determine the order of the first four picks.

Draft order		1st pick lottery probability	Team	2024 RC result (1/3)		2024–25 AFC result (2/3)		Weighted Average
1R	2R and later	1st pick lottery probability	Team	Placement	Record (WL)	Placement	Record (WL)	Weighted Average
1st	2nd	30%	Capital1 Solar Spikers	7th	5–4	11th	1–13	9.67
2nd	3rd	10%	Galeries Tower Highrisers (Note: Galeries and Farm Fresh had an equally weighted score to rank the teams in the draft order. PVL then commenced a tiebreaker lottery, where Farm Fresh got the greater chances in the draft lottery.)	11th	0–8	8th	2–12	9.00
3rd	4th	20%	Farm Fresh Foxies	8th	3–6	10th	5–9	9.00
4th	1st	40%	Nxled Chameleons	10th	1–7	12th	2–12	11.33
5th		—N/a	Zus Coffee Thunderbelles	12th	0–8	7th	7–10	8.67
6th		—N/a	Cignal HD Spikers	3rd	9–2	9th	9–5	7.00
7th		—N/a	Choco Mucho Flying Titans (Note: Choco Mucho and Chery Tiggo had an equally weighted score to rank the teams in the draft order. PVL then commenced a tiebreaker lottery, where Choco Mucho got the seventh pick, and Chery Tiggo got the eighth pick.)	9th	2–6	4th	12–8	5.67
8th		—N/a	Chery Tiggo Crossovers	5th	5–4	6th	7–9	5.67
9th		—N/a	PLDT High Speed Hitters	4th	7–4	5th	9–5	4.67
10th		—N/a	Akari Chargers (Note: Akari and Petro Gazz had an equally weighted score to rank the teams in the draft order. PVL then commenced a tiebreaker lottery, where Akari got the tenth pick, and Petro Gazz got the eleventh pick.)	2nd	10–1	3rd	11–9	2.67
11th		—N/a	Petro Gazz Angels	6th	5–4	1st	18–3	2.67
12th		—N/a	Creamline Cool Smashers	1st	9–2	2nd	16–4	1.67

== Draft selections ==
During the draft, 29 players were selected in four rounds.

Positions key
OH	Outside hitter	MB	Middle blocker	OP	Opposite hitter	S	Setter	L	Libero

‡	National Team Member
	PVL Premier Team Awardee
★	PVL PC Rookie of the Year
	Rookie of the Conference
Player (in italic text)	Unsigned drafted player

=== 1st round ===
Pick	Player	Pos.	Team	College/University
1	Bella Belen ‡ ★	OH	Capital1 Solar Spikers	National University
2	Jean Asis	MB	Galeries Tower Highrisers	Far Eastern University
3	Alohi Robins-Hardy	S	Farm Fresh Foxies	Brigham Young University
4	Lyann De Guzman	OH/OP	Nxled Chameleons	Ateneo de Manila University
5	AC Miner	MB	Zus Coffee Thunderbelles	Ateneo de Manila University
6	Erin Pangilinan	MB/OP	Cignal HD Spikers	National University
7	Tia Andaya ‡	S	Choco Mucho Flying Titans	Central Washington University
8	Baby Jyne Soreño	OP	Chery Tiggo Crossovers	De La Salle University
9	Alleiah Malaluan ‡	OP/OH	PLDT High Speed Hitters	De La Salle University
10	Chenie Tagaod	OH/OP	Akari Chargers	Far Eastern University
11	Julyana Tolentino	S	Petro Gazz Angels	De La Salle University
12	Sheena Toring	MB	Creamline Cool Smashers	National University

=== 2nd round ===
Pick	Player	Pos.	Team	College/University
13	Mayang Nuique	MB/OP	Nxled Chameleons	Adamson University
14	Pia Abbu	MB	Capital1 Solar Spikers	University of Santo Tomas
15	Winnie Bedaña	MB	Galeries Tower Highrisers	University of Perpetual Help System DALTA
16	Ann Monares	L	Farm Fresh Foxies	Far Eastern University
17	Mycah Go	OH	Zus Coffee Thunderbelles	De La Salle–College of Saint Benilde
18	Jessa Ordiales	MB	Cignal HD Spikers	De La Salle University
19	Kylene Villegas	MB	Choco Mucho Flying Titans	Adamson University
20	Erika Deloria	OH	Chery Tiggo Crossovers	Enderun Colleges
21	Zenneth Perolino	MB	PLDT High Speed Hitters	Enderun Colleges
22	Jamaica Villena	MB	Akari Chargers	Emilio Aguinaldo College
23	Nica Celis	MB	Creamline Cool Smashers	University of the Philippines

- Petro Gazz passed during the round.

=== 3rd round ===
Pick	Player	Pos.	Team	College/University
24	Ivy Aquino	MB	Capital1 Solar Spikers	Asian Institute of Maritime Studies
25	Riza Nogales	MB	Zus Coffee Thunderbelles	University of the East
26	Renee Peñafiel	OH	Chery Tiggo Crossovers	University of Santo Tomas
27	Joan Doguna	OH	Akari Chargers	Lyceum of the Philippines University

- Nxled, Galeries Tower, Farm Fresh, Cignal, Choco Mucho, PLDT, and Creamline passed during the round.

=== 4th round ===
Pick	Player	Pos.	Team	College/University
28	Angela Jackson	OH	Zus Coffee Thunderbelles	University of Santo Tomas
29	Reyann Cañete	OP	Chery Tiggo Crossovers	San Beda University

- Capital1 and Akari passed during the round.

=== 5th round ===
A fifth round was held, but all remaining teams passed, thus ending the draft.

== Draft lottery ==
The draft lottery determined the arrangement of the four lowest-ranked teams from results in both the 2024 Reinforced Conference and the 2024–25 All-Filipino Conference in selecting draft applicants in the first round. The lottery was held on May 26, 2025.

Denotes the actual lottery result

Team	2024 RC		2024–25 AFC		1st pick Lottery chances	Lottery probabilities			
Team	Placement	Record	Placement	Record	1st pick Lottery chances	1st	2nd	3rd	4th
Nxled Chameleons	10th	1–7	12th	2–12	40	40.0%	31.6%	20.6%	7.8%
Capital1 Solar Spikers	7th	5–4	11th	1–13	30	30.0%	30.8%	26.2%	13.0%
Farm Fresh Foxies	8th	3–6	10th	5–9	20	20.0%	24.1%	31.7%	24.1%
Galeries Tower Highrisers	11th	0–8	8th	2–12	10	10.0%	13.5%	21.4%	55.1%

== Acquisitions involving draft picks and undrafted free agents ==
- June 18, 2025: Cignal
  - Cignal acquired Pearl Denura, an undrafted and free-agent player.
- June 21, 2025: Choco Mucho
  - Choco Mucho acquired Ayesha Juegos, an undrafted and free-agent player.
- June 26, 2025: Petro Gazz
  - Petro Gazz acquired Pauline De Guzman, an undrafted and free-agent player.
