= Anna DeBeer =

American volleyball player

Personal information
- Hometown: Louisville, Kentucky, U.S
- Education: Louisville

Volleyball information
- Current club: Zus Coffee Thunderbelles
- Number: 18

Career
Years	Teams
2025	Indy Ignite
2025	Zus Coffee Thunderbelles

Anna Beth DeBeer is an American professional volleyball player who last played for the Zus Coffee Thunderbelles of the Premier Volleyball League (PVL) in the Philippines. She played collegiately as an outside hitter for the University of Louisville Cardinals.

== Early life and high school career ==
Anna DeBeer grew up in Louisville, Kentucky and attended Assumption High School. During her high school career, she helped lead her team to multiple state championships and earned accolades for her performance, including being named to All-State teams.

In 2019, DeBeer suffered a left foot injury before the state championship match but still managed to contribute to her team's victory.

== Collegiate career ==
DeBeer began her collegiate volleyball career at the University of Louisville, where she quickly emerged as a key player for the Cardinals. Her contributions have been crucial in the team's rise to national prominence in NCAA Division I women's volleyball.

=== 2024 season ===
During the 2024 season, DeBeer led the team in kills per set (3.37) and provided significant defensive contributions. DeBeer's leadership was particularly evident in the NCAA tournament, where she played a vital role in Louisville's semifinal victory over top-seeded Pittsburgh. In that match, she recorded 14 kills and 9 digs before sustaining a right ankle injury early in the fourth set. Despite the injury, her performance and presence inspired her teammates to secure a win and advance to the championship match.

DeBeer's injury, which occurred after landing awkwardly during a block attempt, sidelined her for the remainder of the semifinal and left her availability for the championship game uncertain. Louisville head coach Dani Busboom Kelly described her status as “day-to-day” but emphasized DeBeer's importance to the team. Freshman Payton Petersen stepped in to replace her and delivered a strong performance, helping Louisville reach their second NCAA championship match in three years.

== Club career ==
=== Indy Ignite ===
DeBeer played for Indy Ignite of the Pro Volleyball Federation. The team ended as runners-up losing to Orlando Valkyries in the final of the 2025 season

=== Zus Coffee Thunderbelles ===
DeBeer went to the Philippines, for her first overseas stint. She joined Premier Volleyball League sides Zus Coffee Thunderbelles as their foreign guest player for the 2025 Reinforced Conference.

== Personal life ==
DeBeer is a Louisville, Kentucky native.
