= Chery Tiggo Crossovers =

Filipino professional women's volleyball team

- Short name: Chery Tiggo
- Nickname: Crossovers
- Founded: 2020 (Note: Formed as the Foton Tornadoes in 2014. Foton was renamed as Chery in 2020. Foton was reestablished as a separate team in 2023.)
- Dissolved: 2025
- History: Foton Tornadoes; 2014–2019; Chery Tiggo Crossovers; 2020–2025; Chery Tiggo EV Crossovers; 2025
- League: Philippine Super Liga (2020); Premier Volleyball League (2021–2025)
- Championships: PVL: 1; 2021 Open

The Chery Tiggo Crossovers were a Filipino professional women's volleyball team owned by United Asia Automotive Group, Inc. (UAAGI) and was named after Chery Tiggo crossover SUVs.

The Chery Tiggo Crossovers debuted in 2020, originally as a rebranding of the Foton Tornadoes, a team that had competed in the Philippine Super Liga since 2013. In 2021, the club turned professional after moving to the Premier Volleyball League (PVL).

The team won one championship in the 2021 PVL Open Conference, their only title in the PVL.

They last played as the Chery Tiggo EV Crossovers at the 2025 Reinforced Conference before disbanding in December 2025.

== History ==
The team debuted in the Philippine Superliga (PSL) during the 2014 Grand Prix as the original Foton Tornadoes. Heading to the 2020 season, the team was renamed to Chery Tiggo Crossovers.

On March 10, 2021, the team announced it has joined the professional PVL. They became the first-ever volleyball champions in a fully-professional league when they won the 2021 PVL Open Conference title.

Chery's former mother team, Foton Tornadoes was temporarily re-established in 2023 and played alongside them in the 2023 Invitational Conference before disbanding again.

Chery Tiggo reach its first ever final since 2021 in the 2025 PVL on Tour conference.

In September 2025, the club had as slight rebranding renaming itself as the Chery Tiggo EV Crossovers. They had their worst finish in the 2025 Reinforced Conference finishing tenth place. In December 2, 2025, Chery Tiggo announced its disbandment.

== International tournaments ==
Chery Tiggo Crossovers has participated in various international tournaments as the original Foton Tornadoes.

Under the Chery Tiggo branding, the club was invited to take part in the 2021 edition of the Asian Club Championship after winning the 2021 PVL Open Conference. However they declined to enter due to COVID-19 pandemic-related concerns.

== Season-by-season records ==
=== Domestic league ===
League	Season	Conference	Preliminary round	Final round	Ranking	Source
PSL	2020	Grand Prix	Conference cancelled			
PVL	2021	Open	2nd (7–2, 23 pts)	Won in championship vs. Creamline, 2–1	Champions	
PVL	2022	Open	4th (1–3, 4 pts) (Pool A)	Lost in quarterfinals vs. Creamline**, 0–3; Finished 8th in 7th–9th classification round	8th place	
PVL	2022	Invitational	7th (1–5, 3 pts)	Did not qualify	8th place	
PVL	2022	Reinforced	2nd (6–2, 16 pts)	Finished 4th in semifinals Lost in 3rd-place match vs. Creamline, 0–2	4th place	
PVL	2023	First All-Filipino	5th (4–4, 13 pts)	Did not qualify	5th place	
PVL	2023	Invitational	3rd (2–2, 6 pts) (Pool A)	Did not qualify Lost in 7th-place match vs. Choco Mucho, 0–3*	8th place	
PVL	2023	Second All-Filipino	4th (8–3, 22 pts)	Lost in semifinals vs. Creamline, 0–2; Lost in 3rd-place match vs. Cignal HD Spikers, 0–2	4th place	
PVL	2024-25	2024 All-Filipino	3rd (9–2, 25 pts)	Finished 4th in semifinals Lost in 3rd-place match vs. Petro Gazz, 1–1 (Note: Chery Tiggo lost on aggregate points ratio, 191–215 (0.888 vs. 1.126).)	4th place	
PVL	2024-25	Reinforced	5th (5–3, 15 pts)	Lost in quarterfinals vs. PLDT, 2–3*	5th place	
PVL	2024-25	Invitational	Did not qualify (Note: Although Chery Tiggo failed to qualify, the team was given an invite to compete in the 2024 Invitational Conference, but declined.)			
PVL	2024-25	2024–25 All-Filipino	8th (5–6, 14 pts)	Lost in quarterfinals vs. Creamline, 0–2	6th place	
PVL	2025–26	PVL on Tour	3rd (3–2, 9 pts) (Pool B)	Lost in championship vs. PLDT, 2–3*	Runner-up	
PVL	2025–26	Invitational	3rd (3–2, 9 pts)	Lost in 3rd-place match vs. Creamline, 0–3*	4th place	
PVL	2025–26	Reinforced	10th (2–6, 6 pts)	Did not qualify	10th place	
An asterisk (*) indicates single match; two asterisks (**) indicate team with twice-to-beat advantage

=== PNVF Champions League ===
Season	Preliminary round	Final round	Ranking	Source
2021	2nd (3–2, 10 pts)	None	2nd place	
2024	2nd (3–1, 9 pts)	Lost in semifinals vs. Petro Gazz, 0–3; Won in 3rd-place match vs. Benilde, 3–0	3rd place	

=== PSL Beach Volleyball Challenge Cup ===
Season	Preliminary round	Final round	Ranking	Source
2021 (Note: The team was known as United Auctioneers for the 2021 Beach Volleyball Challenge Cup.)	3rd (1–2, 3 pts) (Pool B)	Lost in quarterfinals vs. Sta. Lucia B, 1–2; Lost in 5th-place match vs. F2 Logistics, 0–2	6th place	

== Individual awards ==
=== Premier Volleyball League ===
Season	Conference	Award	Name	Source
2021	Open			
2021	Open	Most Valuable Player (Conference)	(Philippines) Jaja Santiago	
2021	Open	Most Valuable Player (Finals)	(Philippines) Jaja Santiago	
2021	Open	2nd Best Middle Blocker	(Philippines) Jaja Santiago	
2022	Reinforced			
2022	Reinforced	Most Valuable Player (Conference)	(Philippines) Mylene Paat	
2022	Reinforced	Best Opposite Spiker	(Philippines) Mylene Paat	
2022	Reinforced	Best Libero	(Philippines) Buding Duremdes	
2023	2nd All-Filipino	1st Best Outside Spiker	(Philippines) Ejiya Laure	
2025–26	Invitational	Best Opposite Spiker	(Philippines) Ara Galang	

=== PNVF Champions League ===
Season	Conference	Award	Name	Source
2021	PNVF Champions League for Women	2nd Best Outside Spiker	(Philippines) Dindin Santiago-Manabat	'
2021	PNVF Champions League for Women	2nd Best Middle Blocker	(Philippines) Maika Ortiz	'
2024	PNVF Champions League for Women	1st Best Middle Blocker	(Philippines) Abigail Maraño	

== Team captains ==
- (Montenegro) Tatjana Bokan (2020)
- (Philippines) Jaja Santiago (2021)
- (Philippines) Jasmine Nabor (2022)
- (Philippines) Maika Ortiz (2022)
- (Philippines) Mylene Paat (2022–2023)
- (Philippines) EJ Laure (2023)
- (Philippines) Aby Maraño (2024–2025)

== Former players ==
=== Locals ===
- Shaya Adorador (2021-2025)
- Alina Bicar
- Cza Carandang
- Joy Dacoron
- Mary Rhose Dapol
- Victonara Galang
- Ponggay Gaston
- Elaine Kasilag
- EJ Laure
- Eya Laure
- May Luna
- Abigail Maraño
- Jasmine Nabor
- Anngela Nunag
- Jennifer Nierva
- Maika Ortiz
- Mylene Paat
- Jennylyn Reyes
- Cess Robles
- Jaja Santiago
- Dindin Santiago-Manabat
- Gyzelle Sy

=== Imports ===
Season	Country	Player
2020	Montenegro	Tatjana Bokan
2022	Montenegro	Jelena Cvijović
2024	United States	Katherine Bell
2025	Cuba	Yunieska Batista

== Drafts ==
Season	Pick No.	Name
2024	9	Karen Verdeflor
2025	8	Baby Jyne Soreño
2025	20	Erika Deloria
2025	26	Renee Peñafiel
2025	29	Reyann Cañete

== Coaches ==
- (Philippines) Aaron Vélez (2020–2022, 2023)
- (Philippines) Clarence Esteban (2022)
- (Philippines) Kungfu Reyes (2024)
- (Philippines) Norman Miguel (2024–2025)
