= Jade Gentapa =

Filipino volleyball player (born 2000)

Personal information
- Nationality: Filipino
- Born: November 28, 2000 (age 25)
- Hometown: Davao City, Philippines
- Height: 1.72 m (5 ft 8 in)
- Education: De La Salle College of Saint Benilde

Volleyball information
- Position: Outside Hitter
- Current club: Zus Coffee Thunderbelles
- Number: 7

Career
Years	Teams
2023	Farm Fresh Foxies
2024–present	Zus Coffee Thunderbelles

Jade Gentapa (born November 28, 2000) is a Filipino professional volleyball player. She played for the Benilde Lady Blazers in the NCAA. She is currently playing for the Zus Coffee Thunderbelles in the Premier Volleyball League (PVL).

== Career ==
=== College ===
Gentapa played for the Lady Blazers of the De La Salle College of Saint Benilde in the National Collegiate Athletic Association (NCAA).

She played her last playing year with her team in the 99th season of the NCAA, where they bagged their back-to-back championship title against Perpetual Lady Altas.

=== Clubs ===
In 2023, she became part of the Farm Fresh Foxies where most of the players are from her collegiate team.

In 2024, she was signed by the Zus Coffee Thunderbelles.

== Awards ==
=== Individual ===
Year	League	Season/Conference	Award	Ref
2023	NCAA	98	Finals MVP	
2023	NCAA	98	2nd Best OH	
2023	V-League	Collegiate	1st Best OH	

=== Collegiate ===
==== Benilde Lady Blazers ====
Year	League	Season/Conference	Title	Ref
2022	NCAA	97	Champions	
2022	V-League	Collegiate	3rd place	
2023	NCAA	98	Champions	
2023	V-League	Collegiate	Champions	
2023	PNVF	Challenge Cup	Champions	
2024	NCAA	99	Champions	

=== Clubs ===
Year	League	Season/Conference	Club	Title	Ref
2025	PVL	Reinforced	Zus Coffee Thunderbelles	Runner-up	
