= AC Miner =

Filipino volleyball player (Alexis Ciarra Lopez Miner; born 2003)

Personal information
- Full name: Alexis Ciarra Lopez Miner
- Nickname: AC
- Nationality: Philippines
- Born: January 27, 2003 (age 23); Angono, Rizal, Philippines
- Education: Ateneo

Volleyball information
- Position: Middle blocker
- Current club: Zus Coffee Thunderbelles
- Number: 15

Career
Years	Teams
2025–present	Zus Coffee Thunderbelles

Alexis Ciarra Lopez Miner (born January 27, 2003) is a Filipino professional volleyball player who plays for the Zus Coffee Thunderbelles of the Premier Volleyball League (PVL).

== Early life and education ==
Alexis Ciarra Miner was born on January 27, 2003, in Angono, Rizal. Her parents are Clifford Miner and Arnie Lopez. She studied at the Far Eastern University Diliman for her high school studies and later at the Ateneo de Manila University for her tertiary studies.

== Career ==
=== High School ===
Miner played for the FEU–D Baby Tamaraws team.

=== Collegiate ===
Miner played for the Ateneo Blue Eagles in the University Athletic Association of the Philippines (UAAP). Usually fielded as a middle blocker, Miner also adopted the role as an opposite hitter in Season 87.

=== Club ===
Miner entered the 2025 draft of the Premier Volleyball League and listed herself as a middle blocker. Miner was the fifth-overall pick and was selected by the Zus Coffee Thunderbelles.

The team reached the finals of the 2025 Reinforced Conference ending as runners-up to eventual champions Petro Gazz Angels. Miner was named Rookie of the Conference for the tournament. Miner was unable to play in the 2026 All-Filipino Conference due to a shin injury. She returned at the 2026 PVL on Tour in July and began transitioning back to the opposite hitter role.
