= Jerry Yee =

Filipino volleyball coach

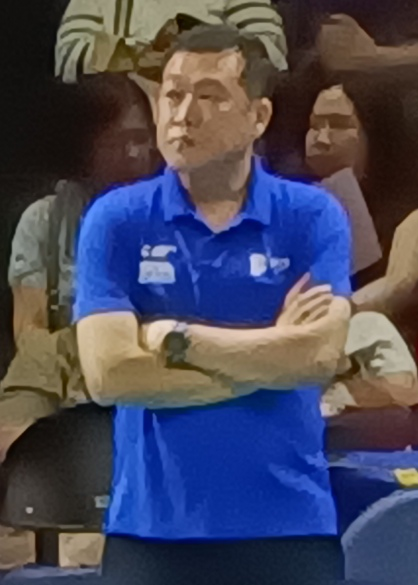
- Yee in 2025

Personal information
- Nationality: Filipino
- Born: April 14, 1974 (age 52)

Coaching information
- Current team: Zus Coffee Thunderbelles; College of Saint Benilde (women); University of the East (women)
- Previous teams coached
- Years: Teams
- 2016–2017; 2017; 2018–; 2018, 2022; 2023; 2023–2024; 2024–: University of the Philippines (women); Sta. Lucia Lady Realtors; College of Saint Benilde (women); Petro Gazz Angels; Adamson University (women); Farm Fresh Foxies; Zus Coffee Thunderbelles

Jerry Yee (born April 14, 1974) is a Filipino volleyball coach who is the head coach of the Zus Coffee Thunderbelles of the Premier Volleyball League, the UE Lady Red Warriors of the UAAP, and the Benilde Lady Blazers of the NCAA.

== Career ==
=== High school ===
Prior to becoming a coach in the collegiate level, Yee was in charge of Hope Christian High School's girls volleyball program as its coach. It was with Hope Christian where Yee first coached Isa Molde, Justine Dorog and Mae Basarte. The school played in the V-League and formed part of the core of the National Capital Region girls team in the Palarong Pambansa.

=== Collegiate ===
==== UAAP ====
Yee has coached teams in the University Athletic Association of the Philippines (UAAP).

===== University of the Philippines =====
Yee first coaches the UP Fighting Maroons in Seasons 78 and 79. He would resign in 2017.

===== Adamson University =====
He would return to coaching in the UAAP in 2023 when he joined the Adamson Lady Falcons He would only coach for Season 85 leading them to a third-place finish; their first ever Final Four appearance since Season 76 in 2014.

He was released in June 7 of the same year shortly after his appointment as the main tactician of the Farm Fresh Foxies in the Premier Volleyball League (PVL) was announced. The company of rival team the Akari Chargers sponsors Adamson.

===== University of the East =====
Yee would then coach the UE Lady Red Warriors in Season 86. He was unable to complete the season as he was mete with a three-month suspension in March 2024 for "acts that are inconsistent with the purposes" of the UAAP. This suspension was characterized as undue. Yee alleged that there is a lack of due process and insinuated that his former employer Adamson was behind the complaint.

==== NCAA ====
===== De La Salle–College of Saint Benilde =====
Yee would also coach the St. Benilde Lady Blazers in the National Collegiate Athletic Association (NCAA) since April 2018. He helped them break Arellano Lady Braves' three-title streak by clinching the Season 97 volleyball title in 2022. He has also oversaw the Lady Blazers take part in the 2018 PVL Collegiate Conference.

In February 2025, the NCAA wrote a letter challenging Yee's dual role of being concurrent head coach of both Benilde and Zus Coffee informing him of the prohibition of its coaches working for professional teams. Onyok Getigan was listed as the head coach for the rest of the season while Yee remained part of the staff.

In January 2026, Yee is head coach again of the Lady Blazers.

=== Club ===
==== Sta. Lucia Realtors ====
The Sta. Lucia Lady Realtors of the Philippine Super Liga were coached by Yee during the 2017 Grand Prix.

==== Petro Gazz Angels ====
Yee would become the coach of the Petro Gazz Angels in the Premier Volleyball League (PVL) when the debuted in 2018. Arnold Laniog would take over from Yee in 2019. Yee remained as part of Petro Gazz as its team consultant.

He would be reinstated as head coach for Petro Gazz in 2022.

==== Farm Fresh Foxies ====
In the middle of his stint with Adamson, Yee was approached to coach a new team in the Premier Volleyball League (PVL). Yee would become coach of the team which would become the Farm Fresh Foxies which had its core formed from players of St. Benilde which Yee also coaches. He would start his stint with Farm Fresh in mid-2023.

==== Zus Coffee Thunderbelles ====
Strong Group Athletics's Zus Coffee Thunderbelles tapped into Yee as the team's coach upon the new PVL team's formation in 2024.
