= Thea Gagate =

Filipino volleyball player (born 2000)

Personal information
- Full name: Thea Allison Ravanera Gagate
- Nationality: Filipino
- Born: July 26, 2000 (age 26) Cebu City Philippines
- Education: De La Salle University
- Height: 1.88 m (6 ft 2 in)
- Weight: 62 kg (137 lb)
- Spike: 314 cm (124 in)
- Block: 300 cm (118 in)

Volleyball information
- Position: Middle Blocker
- Current team: Denso Airybees
- Number: 3

Career
- Years: Team
- 2024–2026: Zus Coffee Thunderbelles
- 2026–present: Denso Airybees

National team
- Years: Team
- 2024–present: Philippines
Honours
Women's volleyball
Representing Philippines
Asian Nations Cup
Silver medal – second place	2025 Hanoi	Team
Bronze medal – third place	2024 Manila	Team
SEA V.League
Silver medal – second place	2026 Chiang Mai	Leg 2
Bronze medal – third place	2024 Vĩnh Phúc	Leg 1
Bronze medal – third place	2024 Nakhon Ratchasima	Leg 2

Thea Allison Ravanera Gagate (born July 26, 2000) is a Filipino volleyball player who is a middle blocker for the Denso Airybees of the Japanese SV.League.

== Early life and education ==
Thea Allison Ravanera Gagate was born on July 26, 2000, in Cebu City, Philippines. Although she took up volleyball during her elementary school days at the University of San Carlos, Gagate was oblivious about the Philippine volleyball scene.

She was a model, standing six foot tall by age 15. She moved to Manila around that age to study at the NU Nazareth School for high school. Playing for the NUNS Lady Bullpups, Gagate began prioritizing volleyball over modelling.

She later moved to the De La Salle University for college, also playing for that school's volleyball team.

== Career ==
=== High school ===
Gagate played for the NUNS Lady Bullpups. She was part of the squad which won back-to-back championships in Seasons 78 and 79 of the University Athletic Association of the Philippines (UAAP).

=== College ===
Gagate made her first senior UAAP game appearance with the De La Salle Lady Spikers in 2020. The league was later cancelled due to the COVID-19 pandemic.

In 2022, the UAAP came back after the league had been cancelled for 2 years because of the COVID-19 pandemic. Her team finished in 2nd place after losing the finals against the NU Lady Bulldogs. She also received the 1st Best Middle Blocker award that season.

In 2023, her team bagged the championship title in the UAAP Season 85 after 5 years of championship drought.

=== Club ===
Gagate joined the Premier Volleyball League (PVL) via the 2024 draft. The Zus Coffee Thunderbelles selected Gagate as the first overall pick for the draft. She helped her team reach its first ever finals at the 2025 Reinforced Conference where it faced eventual champions Petro Gazz Angels.

In July 2026, Japanese club Denso Airybees of the SV.League announced they have signed in Gagate.

=== National team ===
Gagate has played for the Philippine national team, making her debut at the 2024 AVC Women's Challenge Cup. She would go on to win the "Best Middle Blocker" distinction in the 2024 SEA V.League.

Gagate has since featured for the national team in the 2025 AVC Women's Volleyball Nations Cup and in the 2026 AVC Women's Volleyball Cup, however she was absent for the 2025 SEA Games, despite being featured in the initial pool.

== Personal life ==
Her younger brother, Seven Gagate, has played collegiate basketball for UP Fighting Maroons.

== Clubs ==
- (Philippines) Zus Coffee Thunderbelles (2024–2026)
- (Japan) Denso Airybees (2026–present)

== Awards ==
=== Individuals ===
Year	League	Season/Conference	Award	Ref
2016	UAAP	78 (Junior's)	Rookie of the Year	
2017	UAAP	79 (Junior's)	1st Best Middle Blocker	
2022	UAAP	84 (Women's)	1st Best Middle Blocker	
2022	SSL	Pre-Season	1st Best Middle Blocker	
2023	UAAP	85 (Women's)	1st Best Middle Blocker	
2023	SSL	Invitationals	1st Best Middle Blocker	
2024	UAAP	86 (Women's)	1st Best Middle Blocker	
2024	SEA V-League	First Leg	1st Best Middle Blocker	

=== Highschool ===
NSNU Lady Bullpups

Year	League	Season/Conference	Title	Ref
2016	UAAP	78	Champion	
2017	UAAP	79	Champion	

=== Collegiate ===
DLSU Lady Spikers

Year	League	Season/Conference	Title	Ref
2022	UAAP	84	Runner-Up	
2022	SSL	Pre-Season	Runner-Up	
2023	UAAP	85	Champion	
2023	SSL	Invitationals	Champion	
2024	UAAP	86	3rd Place	

=== Clubs ===
Year	League	Season/Conference	Club	Title	Ref
2025	PVL	Reinforced	Zus Coffee Thunderbelles	Runner-up	
