= 2025–26 Galeries Tower Highrisers season =

Third season of the Galeries Tower Highrisers

The 2025–26 Galeries Tower Highrisers season was the third season of the Galeries Tower Highrisers in the Premier Volleyball League (PVL). The team was initially coached by Lerma Giron before parting ways with the team on August 22, 2025. He was subsequently replaced by Godfrey Okumu on the same day.

Ahead of the preseason PVL on Tour, the team lost Alyssa Eroa after she signed with the Zus Coffee Thunderbelles. The team went winless in the preliminary round and were swept by the Chery Tiggo Crossovers to eliminate the Highrisers from the tournament.

The team then signed Montenegrin player Jelena Cvijović to be the team's foreign guest player for the Reinforced Conference.

On January 9, 2026, the Highrisers announced a major rebuild, which included the appointment of Clarence Esteban as head coach and the release of a majority of their roster, only retaining four players. Their acquisitions were led by veteran Aiza Maizo-Pontillas and 2023 V-League Collegiate Challenge Finals MVP Gayle Pascual.

== Roster ==
Galeries Tower Highrisers roster
| No. | Nat. | Player | Pos. | Height | DOB | From |
|---|---|---|---|---|---|---|
| 1 | (Philippines) | Venice Puzon | Setter | 1.57 m (5 ft 2 in) | November 9, 2000 (age 25) | Lyceum |
| 3 | (Philippines) | Winnie Bedaña | Middle Blocker | 1.70 m (5 ft 7 in) | March 20, 2001 (age 25) | UPHSD |
| 4 | (Philippines) | Jules Samonte | Outside Hitter | 1.78 m (5 ft 10 in) | October 22, 1998 (age 27) | Ateneo |
| 5 | (Philippines) | Julia Coronel (C) | Setter | 1.71 m (5 ft 7 in) | October 5, 2001 (age 24) | De La Salle |
| 6 | (Philippines) | Julia Angeles | Libero | 1.63 m (5 ft 4 in) | September 1, 1998 (age 27) | Letran |
| 7 | (Philippines) | Blove Barbon | Libero | 1.63 m (5 ft 4 in) | April 25, 1999 (age 27) | UST |
| 8 | (Philippines) | Aiza Maizo-Pontillas | Opposite Hitter | 1.78 m (5 ft 10 in) | February 29, 1988 (age 38) | UST |
| 9 | (Philippines) | Gayle Pascual | Outside Hitter | 1.72 m (5 ft 8 in) | September 3, 1999 (age 26) | St. Benilde |
| 10 | (Philippines) | Jean Asis | Middle Blocker | 1.78 m (5 ft 10 in) | August 8, 2002 (age 23) | Far Eastern |
| 11 | (Philippines) | Erika Raagas | Outside Hitter | 1.68 m (5 ft 6 in) | March 30, 2000 (age 26) | Ateneo |
| 12 | (Philippines) | Roselle Baliton | Middle Blocker | 1.83 m (6 ft 0 in) | March 27, 1997 (age 29) | UE |
| 13 | (Philippines) | Sharya Ancheta | Middle Blocker | 1.77 m (5 ft 10 in) | November 25, 1999 (age 26) | Adamson |
| 14 | (Philippines) | Camille Victoria | Opposite Hitter | 1.82 m (6 ft 0 in) | December 26, 1999 (age 26) | UST |
| 15 | (Philippines) | Shola Alvarez | Outside Hitter | 1.70 m (5 ft 7 in) | July 11, 1997 (age 29) | José Rizal |
| 16 | (Philippines) | Dolly Versoza | Libero | 1.65 m (5 ft 5 in) | March 10, 1998 (age 28) | José Rizal |
| 17 | (Philippines) | Erika Deloria | Outside Hitter | 1.69 m (5 ft 7 in) | May 20, 2001 (age 25) | Enderun |
| 23 | (Philippines) | Lycha Ebon | Opposite Hitter | 1.70 m (5 ft 7 in) | October 23, 1999 (age 26) | Far Eastern |
| 24 | (Philippines) | Maji Mangulabnan | Setter | 1.64 m (5 ft 5 in) | March 24, 1999 (age 27) | UST |

Coaching staff

- Head coach:
  Clarence Esteban
- Assistant coaches:
  Rommel Abella
  Franz Damian
  John David Subere
  Lorence Cruz
  John Michael Millado
- Statistician:
  Enzo Miguel Vinarao
  John Emmanuel Dedoroy
- Strength and conditioning coach:
  Kim Robert Bejo

Team staff

- Team manager:
  Rontristan Notado
  Jolina Paz Nicolas

Medical staff

- Physical therapist:
  Juan Miguel Duzon

=== National team players ===
Players who were part of the Philippines women's national team were excluded from playing with the team due to various commitments. This affected the team's roster for the PVL on Tour.

- Julia Coronel

== Draft ==
| Round | Pick | Player | Pos. | School |
|---|---|---|---|---|
| 1 | 2 | Jean Asis | MB | FEU |
| 2 | 15 | Winnie Bedaña | MB | Perpetual |

== PVL on Tour ==
=== Preliminary round ===
==== Pool A standings ====
| Pos | Team | Pld | W | L | Pts | SW | SL | SR | SPW | SPL | SPR | Qualification |
|---|---|---|---|---|---|---|---|---|---|---|---|---|
| 2 | Nxled Chameleons | 5 | 4 | 1 | 11 | 12 | 6 | 2.000 | 408 | 381 | 1.071 | Final round |
| 3 | Farm Fresh Foxies | 5 | 3 | 2 | 9 | 9 | 7 | 1.286 | 359 | 371 | 0.968 | Knockout round |
| 4 | Petro Gazz Angels | 5 | 2 | 3 | 7 | 8 | 10 | 0.800 | 390 | 406 | 0.961 | Knockout round |
| 5 | Choco Mucho Flying Titans | 5 | 1 | 4 | 3 | 7 | 13 | 0.538 | 439 | 481 | 0.913 | Knockout round |
| 6 | Galeries Tower Highrisers | 5 | 0 | 5 | 0 | 1 | 15 | 0.067 | 335 | 386 | 0.868 | Knockout round |

Source: PVL.ph

==== Match log ====
2025 PVL on Tour preliminary round match log
Total: 0–5 (0 points)
June: 0–2 (0 points)

| Match | Date | Opponent | Sets | Total | Location Attendance | Record | Pts | Report |
|---|---|---|---|---|---|---|---|---|
| 1 | June 28, 2025 | Choco Mucho | 1–3 | 86–88 | Batangas City Sports Center; 2,437 | 0–1 | 0 | P2 |
| 2 | June 29, 2025 | Petro Gazz | 0–3 | 68–76 | Batangas City Sports Center; 2,345 | 0–2 | 0 | P2 |

July: 0–3 (0 points)

| Match | Date | Opponent | Sets | Total | Location Attendance | Record | Pts | Report |
|---|---|---|---|---|---|---|---|---|
| 3 | July 12, 2025 | Nxled | 0–3 | 70–76 | Filoil Centre; 515 | 0–3 | 0 | P2 |
| 4 | July 13, 2025 | Farm Fresh | 0–3 | 60–77 | University of San Jose–Recoletos; 2,350 | 0–4 | 0 | P2 |
| 5 | July 29, 2025 | PLDT | 0–3 | 51–75 | University of San Jose–Recoletos; 1,398 | 0–5 | 0 | P2 |

=== Knockout round ===
==== Match log ====
2025 PVL on Tour knockout round match log
Total: 0–1 (0 points)
Knockout round: 0–1 (0 points)

| Date | Opponent | Sets | Total | Location Attendance | Report |
|---|---|---|---|---|---|
| August 2, 2025 | Chery Tiggo | 0–3 | 66–75 | City of Dasmariñas Arena | |

== Reinforced Conference ==
=== Preliminary round ===
==== Standings ====
| Pos | Team | Pld | W | L | Pts | SW | SL | SR | SPW | SPL | SPR | Qualification |
|---|---|---|---|---|---|---|---|---|---|---|---|---|
| 8 | Akari Chargers | 8 | 4 | 4 | 12 | 18 | 16 | 1.125 | 749 | 731 | 1.025 | Quarterfinals |
| 9 | Choco Mucho Flying Titans | 8 | 3 | 5 | 9 | 11 | 17 | 0.647 | 621 | 660 | 0.941 | |
| 10 | Chery Tiggo EV Crossovers | 8 | 2 | 6 | 6 | 12 | 20 | 0.600 | 673 | 724 | 0.930 | |
| 11 | Nxled Chameleons | 8 | 0 | 8 | 1 | 5 | 24 | 0.208 | 576 | 701 | 0.822 | |
| 12 | Galeries Tower Highrisers | 8 | 0 | 8 | 0 | 2 | 24 | 0.083 | 465 | 635 | 0.732 | |

Source: Premier Volleyball League

==== Match log ====
2025 PVL Reinforced Conference preliminary round match log
Total: 0–8 (0 points)
First round: 0–5 (0 points)

| Match | Date | Opponent | Sets | Total | Location Attendance | Record | Pts | Report |
|---|---|---|---|---|---|---|---|---|
| 1 | October 9, 2025 | Petro Gazz | 0–3 | 54–75 | City of Dasmariñas Arena; 461 | 0–1 | 0 | P2 |
| 2 | October 14, 2025 | Zus Coffee | 0–3 | 54–75 | Smart Araneta Coliseum; 1,510 | 0–2 | 0 | P2 |
| 3 | October 18, 2025 | Creamline | 0–3 | 35–75 | Capital Arena; 6,491 | 0–3 | 0 | P2 |
| 4 | October 23, 2025 | Chery Tiggo | 0–3 | 48–75 | Filoil Centre; 574 | 0–4 | 0 | P2 |
| 5 | October 28, 2025 | Akari | 0–3 | 57–75 | Filoil Centre; 580 | 0–5 | 0 | P2 |

Second round: 0–3 (0 points)

| Match | Date | Opponent | Sets | Total | Location Attendance | Record | Pts | Report |
|---|---|---|---|---|---|---|---|---|
| 6 | November 8, 2025 | PLDT | 1–3 | 81–94 | Candon City Arena; 1,550 | 0–6 | 0 | P2 |
| 7 | November 15, 2025 | Farm Fresh | 0–3 | 47–75 | Ynares Center Montalban; 148 | 0–7 | 0 | P2 |
| 8 | November 20, 2025 | Capital1 | 1–3 | 89–81 | SM Mall of Asia Arena; 690 | 0–8 | 0 | P2 |

== All-Filipino Conference ==
=== Preliminary round ===
==== Standings ====
| Pos | Team | Pld | W | L | Pts | SW | SL | SR | SPW | SPL | SPR | Qualification |
|---|---|---|---|---|---|---|---|---|---|---|---|---|
| 6 | Akari Chargers | 9 | 5 | 4 | 15 | 19 | 18 | 1.056 | 792 | 838 | 0.945 | Play-in tournament semifinals |
| 7 | Choco Mucho Flying Titans | 9 | 4 | 5 | 13 | 19 | 19 | 1.000 | 828 | 826 | 1.002 | Play-in tournament quarterfinals |
| 8 | Capital1 Solar Spikers | 9 | 4 | 5 | 10 | 14 | 21 | 0.667 | 748 | 796 | 0.940 | Play-in tournament quarterfinals |
| 9 | Galeries Tower Highrisers | 9 | 2 | 7 | 6 | 11 | 24 | 0.458 | 707 | 800 | 0.884 | Play-in tournament quarterfinals |
| 10 | Zus Coffee Thunderbelles | 9 | 1 | 8 | 3 | 9 | 26 | 0.346 | 693 | 819 | 0.846 | Play-in tournament quarterfinals |

Source: Premier Volleyball League

==== Match log ====
2026 PVL All-Filipino Conference preliminary round match log
Total: 2–7 (6 points)
January: 0–1 (0 points)

| Match | Date | Opponent | Sets | Total | Location Attendance | Record | Pts | Report |
|---|---|---|---|---|---|---|---|---|
| 1 | January 31, 2026 | Cignal | 0–3 | 42–75 | Filoil Centre; 1,934 | 0–1 | 0 | P2 |

February: 2–2 (6 points)

| Match | Date | Opponent | Sets | Total | Location Attendance | Record | Pts | Report |
|---|---|---|---|---|---|---|---|---|
| 2 | February 7, 2026 | Zus Coffee | 3–2 | 110–102 | Ynares Center Montalban; 394 | 1–0 | 2 | P2 |
| 3 | February 14, 2026 | Farm Fresh | 0–3 | 41–75 | Ynares Center Antipolo; 673 | 1–1 | 2 | P2 |
| 4 | February 19, 2026 | Nxled | 3–1 | 92–85 | Filoil Centre; 440 | 2–1 | 5 | P2 |
| 5 | February 26, 2026 | Choco Mucho | 2–3 | 99–108 | Filoil Centre; 1,092 | 2–2 | 6 | P2 |

March: 0–4 (0 points)

| Match | Date | Opponent | Sets | Total | Location Attendance | Record | Pts | Report |
|---|---|---|---|---|---|---|---|---|
| 6 | March 3, 2026 | Creamline | 1–3 | 80–92 | Filoil Centre; 2,246 | 0–1 | 6 | P2 |
| 7 | March 10, 2026 | PLDT | 0–3 | 57–75 | Filoil Centre; 588 | 0–2 | 6 | P2 |
| 8 | March 17, 2026 | Akari | 1–3 | 95–90 | Filoil Centre; 2,008 | 0–3 | 6 | P2 |
| 9 | March 21, 2026 | Capital1 | 1–3 | 91–98 | Filoil Centre; 1,661, | 0–4 | 6 | P2 |

=== Play-in tournament ===
==== Pool A ====
Play-in pool A quarterfinal
8 | Capital1 | 0
9 | Galeries Tower | 3

Play-in pool A semifinal
5 | Nxled | 3
9 | Galeries Tower | 0

Play-in pool A final
4 | Farm Fresh | 3
5 | Nxled | 0

==== Match log ====
2026 PVL All-Filipino Conference play-in tournament match log
Total: 1–1 (3 points)
Play-in tournament: 1–1 (3 points)

| Match | Date | Opponent | Sets | Total | Location Attendance | Record | Pts | Report |
|---|---|---|---|---|---|---|---|---|
| 1 | March 24, 2026 | Capital1 | 3–0 | 80–64 | Filoil Centre; 613 | 1–0 | 3 | P2 |
| 2 | March 28, 2026 | Nxled | 0–3 | 64–75 | Ninoy Aquino Stadium; 1,875 | 1–1 | 3 | P2 |

== Transactions ==
=== Additions ===
| Player | Date signed | Previous team | Ref. |
|---|---|---|---|
| Marian Andal | June 19, 2025 | Perpetual Lady Altas (NCAA) | |
| Lia Pelaga | June 19, 2025 | Nxled Chameleons | |
| Ivy Perez | June 19, 2025 | Nxled Chameleons | |
| Julia Angeles | January 9, 2026 | Zus Coffee Thunderbelles | |
| Blove Barbon | January 10, 2026 | Petro Gazz Angels | |
| Lycha Ebon | January 10, 2026 | Nxled Chameleons | |
| Erika Raagas | January 10, 2026 | Akari Chargers | |
| Erika Deloria | January 11, 2026 | Chery Tiggo EV Crossovers | |
| Dolly Versoza | January 11, 2026 | Zus Coffee Thunderbelles | |
| Camille Victoria | January 11, 2026 | Akari Chargers | |
| Shola Alvarez | January 12, 2026 | Capital1 Solar Spikers | |
| Shar Ancheta | January 12, 2026 | Zus Coffee Thunderbelles | |
| Aiza Maizo-Pontillas | January 12, 2026 | Petro Gazz Angels | |
| Jules Samonte | January 13, 2025 | Chery Tiggo EV Crossovers | |
| Gayle Pascual | January 13, 2025 | Zus Coffee Thunderbelles | |
| Venice Puzon | January 13, 2025 | Lyceum Lady Pirates (NCAA) | |
| Maji Mangulabnan | January 13, 2025 | Nxled Chameleons | |
| Jean Asis | June 9, 2025 | FEU Lady Tamaraws (UAAP) | |
| Winnie Bedaña | June 9, 2025 | Perpetual Lady Altas (NCAA) | |

=== Subtractions ===
| Player | New team | Ref. |
|---|---|---|
| Marian Andal | Free agency | |
| Dodee Batindaan | Free agency | |
| Juliet Catindig | Free agency | |
| Fen Emnas | Free agency | |
| Jewel Encarnacion | Cignal Super Spikers | |
| Alyssa Eroa | Zus Coffee Thunderbelles | |
| Carly Hernandez | Free agency | |
| Ysa Jimenez | Capital1 Solar Spikers | |
| Renee Mabilangan | Zus Coffee Thunderbelles | |
| Andrea Marzan | Free agency | |
| Dimdim Pacres | Free agency | |
| Shannen Palec | Free agency | |
| Audrey Paran | Free agency | |
| Lia Pelaga | Free agency | |
| Ivy Perez | Cignal Super Spikers | |
| France Ronquillo | Capital1 Solar Spikers | |

=== Foreign guest player ===
| Team | Foreign player | Moving from | Ref. |
|---|---|---|---|
| Galeries Tower Highrisers | (Montenegro) Jelena Cvijović | (Greece) EA Larissa | |

=== Coaching changes ===
| Team | Outgoing coach | Manner of departure | Replaced by | Ref |
|---|---|---|---|---|
| Galeries Tower Highrisers | (Philippines) Lerma Giron | Replaced | (Kenya) Godfrey Okumu | |
| Galeries Tower Highrisers | (Kenya) Godfrey Okumu | Replaced | (Philippines) Aying Esteban | |
