= List of Premier Volleyball League players =

This article compiles players who have played in the Premier Volleyball League, a professional women's volleyball league in the Philippines. This list only includes players who have played for the league's member teams and does not include guest teams or collegiate teams. (Note: The list also does not include commercial teams that are the result of a collegiate partnership including the Adamson–Akari Lady Falcons (2017–2018), BaliPure–NU Water Defenders (2018), and Ateneo–Motolite Lady Eagles (2018).) Foreign players are also not included.

Players highlighted in bold are current active players.

== A ==
| Name | Position | PVL years | Teams | Ref. |
|---|---|---|---|---|
| **Judith Abil** | OH/L | 2018; 2021; 2023–present | Tacloban Fighting Warays (2018); BaliPure Purest Water Defenders (2021); Nxled Chameleons (2023); Cignal HD/Super Spikers (2024–2025); Akari Chargers (2026–present) | |
| **Jackie Acuña** | MB | 2022–present | Cignal HD/Super Spikers (2022–2026); Nxled Chameleons (2026–present) | |
| **Shaya Adorador** | OH | 2021–present | Chery Tiggo Crossovers (2021–2023); Foton Tornadoes (2023); Chery Tiggo Crossovers (2023–2025); Capital1 Solar Spikers (2026–present) | |
| **Mars Alba** | S | 2023–present | F2 Logistics Cargo Movers (2023); Choco Mucho Flying Titans (2024); Akari Chargers (2025–present) | |
| **Angelica Alcantara** | S | 2024–present | PLDT High Speed Hitters (2024–present) | |
| Tia Andaya | S | 2025–2026 | Choco Mucho Flying Titans (2025–2026) | |
| **Kath Arado** | L | 2021–present | Petro Gazz Angels (2021); PLDT High Speed Hitters (2022–present) | |
| **Kyla Atienza** | L | 2018–present | Creamline Cool Smashers (2018–present) | |

== B ==
| Name | Position | PVL years | Teams | Ref. |
|---|---|---|---|---|
| Ging Balse | MB | 2021–2023 | Philippine Army Lady Troopers (2023–present) | |
| **Majoy Baron** | MB | 2022–present | F2 Logistics Cargo Movers (2022–2023); PLDT High Speed Hitters (2024–present) | |
| **Bella Belen** | OH | 2025–present | Capital1 Solar Spikers (2025–present) | |
| **Lorie Bernardo** | OPP/MB | 2022–present | Creamline Cool Smashers (2025–present) | |
| **Alina Bicar** | S | 2017–2018; 2021–present | Power Smashers (2017); Tacloban Fighting Warays (2018); BaliPure Purest Water Defenders (2021); Petro Gazz Angels (2021); BaliPure Purest Water Defenders (2022); Chery Tiggo Crossovers (2022–2025); Choco Mucho Flying Titans (2026–present) | |

== C ==
| Name | Position | PVL years | Teams | Ref. |
|---|---|---|---|---|
| Cza Carandang | MB | 2018; 2021–2026 | PayMaya High Flyers (2018); Perlas Spikers (2021); Chery Tiggo Crossovers (2022–2025); Akari Chargers (2026) | |
| **Tots Carlos** | OPP | 2017; 2019–present | Perlas Spikers (2017); Motolite Power Builders (2019–2020); Creamline Cool Smashers (2021–present) | |
| Fille Cayetano | OH | 2017–2023 | Pocari Sweat Lady Warriors (2017); Creamline Cool Smashers (2018–2023) | |
| **Gel Cayuna** | S | 2018; 2021–present | PayMaya High Flyers (2018); Perlas Spikers (2021); Cignal HD/Super Spikers (2022–2026); Nxled Chameleons (2026–present) | |
| **Desiree Cheng** | OH | 2022–present | Choco Mucho Flying Titans (2022–present) | |
| **Djanel Cheng** | S | 2018–present | Petro Gazz Angels (2018–2020); Sta. Lucia Lady Realtors (2021–2022); Petro Gazz Angels (2022–2025); Nxled Chameleons (2026–present) | |
| Des Clemente-de Guzman | MB | 2022–2026 | F2 Logistics Cargo Movers (2022–2023); Petro Gazz Angels (2023–2024); Capital1 Solar Spikers (2024–2025); Farm Fresh Foxies (2025–2026) | |
| Michelle Cobb | S | 2018–2019; 2022–2025 | F2 Logistics Cargo Movers (2018–2019); Akari Chargers (2022–2025) | |
| **Julia Coronel** | S/OPP | 2024–present | Galeries Tower Highrisers (2024–2026); Capital1 Solar Spikers (2026–present) | |
| Cha Cruz-Behag | OH | 2022–2023 | F2 Logistics Cargo Movers (2022–2023) | |

== D ==
| Name | Position | PVL years | Teams | Ref. |
|---|---|---|---|---|
| **Mary Rhose Dapol** | OH | 2023–present | Foton Tornadoes (2023); Chery Tiggo Crossovers (2024–2025); Akari Chargers (2026–present) | |
| **Rachel Daquis** | OH | 2021–present | Cignal HD Spikers (2021–2023); Farm Fresh Foxies (2024–2025); Zus Coffee Thunderbelles (2026–present) | |
| **Savi Davison** | OH | 2023–present | PLDT High Speed Hitters (2023–present) | |
| **Jia de Guzman** | OH | 2017–2023; 2026–present | Creamline Cool Smashers (2017–2023; 2026–present) | |
| **Ella de Jesus** | OH | 2017–present | Perlas Spikers (2017–2019); Creamline Cool Smashers (2020–present) | |
| **Bea de Leon** | OH | 2019–present | Choco Mucho Flying Titans (2019–2024); Creamline Cool Smashers (2024–present) | |
| **Erika Deloria** | OH | 2025–present | Chery Tiggo Crossovers (2025); Galeries Tower Highrisers (2026–present) | |
| Rhea Dimaculangan | S | 2021–2025 | PLDT Home Fibr Power/High Speed Hitters (2021–2024); Creamline Cool Smashers (2025) | |
| **Celine Domingo** | MB | 2019–present | Creamline Cool Smashers (2019–2023); Akari Chargers (2024–present) | |
| **Roselyn Doria** | MB | 2021–present | Cignal HD/Super Spikers (2021–2026); Farm Fresh Foxies (2026–present) | |
| Justine Dorog | L | 2021–2023 | Chery Tiggo Crossovers (2021–2022); Quezon City Gerflor Defenders (2023); Farm Fresh Foxies (2023) | |
| **Kim Kianna Dy** | OPP/MB | 2022–present | F2 Logistics Cargo Movers (2022–2023); PLDT High Speed Hitters (2024–present) | |

== E ==
| Name | Position | PVL years | Teams | Ref. |
|---|---|---|---|---|
| **Alyssa Eroa** | L | 2017–2018; 2021; 2024–present | BaliPure Purest Water Defenders (2017); PayMaya High Flyers (2018); BaliPure Purest Water Defenders (2021); Galeries Tower Highrisers (2024–2025); Zus Coffee Thunderbelles (2025–present) | |
| **Wielyn Estoque** | OH | 2023; 2025–present | Farm Fresh Foxies (2023); Zus Coffee Thunderbelles (2025–present) | |

== F ==
| Name | Position | PVL years | Teams | Ref. |
|---|---|---|---|---|
| **Kim Fajardo** | S | 2022–present | F2 Logistics Cargo Movers (2022–2023); PLDT High Speed Hitters (2024–present) | |
| Jem Ferrer | S | 2017–2026 | Perlas Spikers (2017–2021); Choco Mucho Flying Titans (2021–2026) | |

== G ==
| Name | Position | PVL years | Teams | Ref. |
|---|---|---|---|---|
| **Ara Galang** | OH/OPP | 2022–present | F2 Logistics Cargo Movers (2022–2023); Chery Tiggo Crossovers (2024–2025); Farm Fresh Foxies (2026–present) | |
| **Jema Galanza** | OH | 2017–present | Creamline Cool Smashers (2017–present) | |
| Mafe Galanza | S | 2023–2025 | Creamline Cool Smashers (2023–2025) | |
| **Michelle Gamit** | MB | 2023–present | Farm Fresh Foxies (2023–2024); Zus Coffee Thunderbelles (2024–2025); Creamline Cool Smashers (2026–present) | |
| **Vanie Gandler** | OH | 2023–present | Cignal HD/Super Spikers (2023–2026); Capital1 Solar Spikers (2026–present) | |
| **Pauline Gaston** | OH/OPP/MB | 2020–present | Choco Mucho Flying Titans (2020–2022); Chery Tiggo Crossovers (2023–2025); Capital1 Solar Spikers (2026–present) | |
| Trisha Genesis | OH | 2022–2026 | Akari Chargers (2022–2024); Capital1 Solar Spikers (2025–2026) | |
| **Jade Gentapa** | OH | 2023–present | Farm Fresh Foxies (2023); Zus Coffee Thunderbelles (2024–2026); Galeries Tower Highrisers (2026–present) | |
| Dzi Gervacio | OPP | 2017–2019; 2022–2025 | Perlas Spikers (2017–2019); F2 Logistics Cargo Movers (2022); Petro Gazz Angels (2023–2025) | |
| **Mycah Go** | OH | 2025–present | Zus Coffee Thunderbelles (2018–present) | |
| Melissa Gohing | L | 2017–2019 | Pocari Sweat Lady Warriors (2017); Creamline Cool Smashers (2018–2019) | |
| **Jovelyn Gonzaga** | OPP | 2021–present | Philippine Army Lady Troopers (2021–2022); Cignal HD Spikers (2023); Zus Coffee Thunderbelles (2024–present) | |
| Heather Guino-o | OH | 2017–2026 | Pocari Sweat Lady Warriors (2017); Tacloban Fighting Warays (2018); Creamline Cool Smashers (2019); Perlas Spikers (2021); PLDT High Speed Hitters (2022); Petro Gazz Angels (2023); Capital1 Solar Spikers (2024–2025); Cignal HD/Super Spikers (2025–2026) | |
| **Michele Gumabao** | OPP | 2018–present | Creamline Cool Smashers (2018–present) | |

== J ==
| Name | Position | PVL years | Teams | Ref. |
|---|---|---|---|---|
| **Barbie Jamili** | OH | 2026–present | Creamline Cool Smashers (2026–present) | |
| **Justine Jazareno** | L | 2023–present | Akari Chargers (2023–present) | |

== K ==
| Name | Position | PVL years | Teams | Ref. |
|---|---|---|---|---|
| Elaine Kasilag | OPP | 2017–2018; 2021–2025 | Pocari Sweat Lady Warriors (2017–2018); Chery Tiggo Crossovers (2021–2022); F2 Logistics Cargo Movers (2022–2023); Farm Fresh Foxies (2024–2025) | |

== L ==
| Name | Position | PVL years | Teams | Ref. |
|---|---|---|---|---|
| **Ivy Lacsina** | OH/MB | 2022–present | F2 Logistics Cargo Movers (2022–2023); Nxled Chameleons (2023–2024); Akari Chargers (2024–present) | |
| **Ishie Lalongisip** | OPP | 2024–present | Cignal HD/Super Spikers (2024–2026); Creamline Cool Smashers (2026–present) | |
| **Camilla Lamina** | S | 2026–present | Galeries Tower Highrisers (2026–present) | |
| **Maicah Larroza** | All positions | 2024–present | Farm Fresh Foxies (2024–present) | |
| **EJ Laure** | OH | 2022–present | Chery Tiggo Crossovers (2022–2024); Nxled Chameleons (2024–present) | |
| **Eya Laure** | OH/OPP/S | 2023–2024; 2026–present | Chery Tiggo Crossovers (2023–2024); Choco Mucho Flying Titans (2026–present) | |
| **Denden Lazaro-Revilla** | L | 2020–present | Choco Mucho Flying Titans (2020–2024); Creamline Cool Smashers (2024–present) | |
| May Luna | OH | 2021–2025 | Cignal HD Spikers (2021); Chery Tiggo Crossovers (2022–2023); Foton Tornadoes (2023); Nxled Chameleons (2023–2025) | |

== M ==
| Name | Position | PVL years | Teams | Ref. |
|---|---|---|---|---|
| **Dawn Macandili-Catindig** | L | 2022–present | F2 Logistics Cargo Movers (2022–2023); Cignal HD/Super Spikers (2024–2026); Choco Mucho Flying Titans (2026–present) | |
| **Maddie Madayag** | MB | 2019–present | Choco Mucho Flying Titans (2019–2024; 2025–present) | |
| **Aiza Maizo-Pontillas** | OPP | 2021–present | Sta. Lucia Lady Realtors (2021); Petro Gazz Angels (2022–2025); Galeries Tower Highrisers (2026–present) | |
| Rizza Mandapat | OPP | 2017–2025 | Creamline Cool Smashers (2017–2025) | |
| Aby Maraño | MB/L | 2022–2026 | F2 Logistics Cargo Movers (2022–2023); Chery Tiggo Crossovers (2024–2025); Nxled Chameleons (2026) | |
| **Mean Mendrez** | OH/MB | 2018; 2021–present | Petro Gazz Angels (2018; 2021); PLDT High Speed Hitters (2022–2023); Choco Mucho Flying Titans (2024–present) | |
| **Ria Meneses** | MB | 2021–present | Petro Gazz Angels (2021); Cignal HD Spikers (2022–2024); Farm Fresh Foxies (2025–present) | |
| **AC Miner** | MB | 2025–present | Zus Coffee Thunderbelles (2025–present) | |
| **Isa Molde** | OH | 2019–present | Motolite Power Builders (2019); PLDT Home Fibr Power Hitters (2021); Choco Mucho Flying Titans (2022–present) | |
| **Frances Molina** | OH | 2021–present | Petro Gazz Angels (2021); Cignal HD Spikers (2022–2024); Farm Fresh Foxies (2025–present) | |
| **Cloanne Mondoñedo** | S | 2023–present | Farm Fresh Foxies (2023); Zus Coffee Thunderbelles (2024–present) | |

== N ==
| Name | Position | PVL years | Teams | Ref. |
|---|---|---|---|---|
| **Jasmine Nabor** | S | 2017–2018; 2021–present | BaliPure Purest Water Defenders (2017); PayMaya High Flyers (2018); Chery Tiggo Crossovers (2021–2023); Foton Tornadoes (2023); Chery Tiggo Crossovers (2024–2025); Capital1 Solar Spikers (2026–present) | |
| **Kyle Negrito** | S | 2018–present | Tacloban Fighting Warays (2018); Creamline Cool Smashers (2018–present) | |
| **Jen Nierva** | L | 2023–present | Chery Tiggo Crossovers (2023–2025); Creamline Cool Smashers (2026–present) | |
| **Faith Nisperos** | OH | 2023–present | Akari Chargers (2023–present) | |
| **Riza Nogales** | MB | 2025–present | Zus Coffee Thunderbelles (2025–present) | |
| **Zam Nolasco** | MB | 2023; 2026–present | Farm Fresh Foxies (2023); Zus Coffee Thunderbelles (2026–present) | |
| **Mayang Nuique** | OPP | 2025–present | Nxled Chameleons (2025–2026); Capital1 Solar Spikers (2026–present) | |
| Anngela Nunag | L | 2017; 2021–2025 | Creamline Cool Smashers (2017); Philippine Army Lady Troopers (2021–2023); Cignal HD Spikers (2023–2024); Chery Tiggo Crossovers (2024–2025) | |
| **Cherry Nunag** | MB | 2020–present | Perlas Spikers (2020–2021); Choco Mucho Flying Titans (2021–2025); Capital1 Solar Spikers (2026–present) | |

== O ==
| Name | Position | PVL years | Teams | Ref. |
|---|---|---|---|---|
| Maika Ortiz | MB | 2021–2026 | Chery Tiggo Crossovers (2021–2022); Choco Mucho Flying Titans (2022–2025); Zus Coffee Thunderbelles (2025–2026) | |

== P ==
| Name | Position | PVL years | Teams | Ref. |
|---|---|---|---|---|
| Dimdim Pacres | OPP | 2017–2018; 2023–2026 | Power Smashers (2017); Tacloban Fighting Warays (2018); Galeries Tower Highrisers (2023–2026) | |
| **Mylene Paat** | OPP | 2021–present | Chery Tiggo Crossovers (2021–2025); Farm Fresh Foxies (2026–present) | |
| **Myla Pablo** | OH | 2017–present | Pocari Sweat Lady Warriors (2017–2018); Motolite Power Builders (2019–2020); Petro Gazz Angels (2021–2023); F2 Logistics Cargo Movers (2023); Petro Gazz Angels (2024–2025); Nxled Chameleons (2026–present) | |
| **Remy Palma** | MB | 2017–present | Petro Gazz Angels (2021–2025); Farm Fresh Foxies (2026–present) | |
| **Dell Palomata** | MB | 2018; 2021–present | Pocari Sweat–Air Force Lady Warriors (2018); Sta. Lucia Lady Realtors (2021–2022); PLDT High Speed Hitters (2022–present) | |
| **Jeanette Panaga** | MB | 2017–present | Pocari Sweat Lady Warriors (2017–2018); Petro Gazz Angels (2019–2020); Creamline Cool Smashers (2021–present) | |
| **Erin Pangilinan** | OPP/MB | 2025–present | Cignal HD/Super Spikers (2025–2026); Creamline Cool Smashers (2026–present) | |
| Tatan Pantone | L | 2017–2018 | BaliPure Purest Water Defenders (2017); PayMaya High Flyers (2018) | |
| **Gayle Pascual** | OH/OPP | 2023–present | Farm Fresh Foxies (2023); Zus Coffee Thunderbelles (2024–2025); Galeries Tower Highrisers (2026–present) | |
| **Detdet Pepito** | L | 2026–present | Capital1 Solar Spikers (2026–present) | |
| **Chiara Permentilla** | OH | 2022–present | Akari Chargers (2022–2024); Nxled Chameleons (2024–present) | |
| **MJ Phillips** | OPP/OH/MB | 2021–present | Sta. Lucia Lady Realtors (2021); Petro Gazz Angels (2022–2025); Nxled Chameleons (2026–present) | |
| **Bang Pineda** | L | 2019–present | Choco Mucho Flying Titans (2019); Sta. Lucia Lady Realtors (2021); Petro Gazz Angels (2022); Akari Chargers (2023–2025); Petro Gazz Angels (2025); Nxled Chameleons (2026–present) | |
| **Thang Ponce** | L | 2019–present | Motolite Power Builders (2019–2020); Perlas Spikers (2020–2022); Choco Mucho Flying Titans (2026–present) | |
| **Bernadeth Pons** | OH | 2023–present | Creamline Cool Smashers (2023–present) | |
| **Jovie Prado** | OH | 2017–present | Power Smashers (2017); Tacloban Fighting Warays (2018); Petro Gazz Angels (2019–2021); Sta. Lucia Lady Realtors (2021); PLDT High Speed Hitters (2022–present) | |

== R ==
| Name | Position | PVL years | Teams | Ref. |
|---|---|---|---|---|
| Cesca Racraquin | OH | 2017–2018 | Creamline Cool Smashers (2017); Pocari Sweat Lady Warriors (2018) | |
| Dani Ravena | L | 2022–2026 | Akari Chargers (2022–2023); Nxled Chameleons (2023–2024); Akari Chargers (2024–2026) | |
| **Mika Reyes** | MB | 2021–present | Sta. Lucia Lady Realtors (2021); PLDT High Speed Hitters (2022–present) | |
| **Alohi Robins-Hardy** | S | 2025–present | Farm Fresh Foxies (2025–present) | |
| **Cess Robles** | OH | 2023–present | Chery Tiggo Crossovers (2023–2025); Zus Coffee Thunderbelles (2026–present) | |
| Sue Roces | OH | 2017–2021 | Perlas Spikers (2017–2021) | |
| **Louie Romero** | S | 2023–present | Farm Fresh Foxies (2023–present) | |
| **Sisi Rondina** | OH | 2023–present | Choco Mucho Flying Titans (2023–present) | |
| **Dij Rodriguez** | OPP | 2024–present | Creamline Cool Smashers (2024–present) | |

== S ==
| Name | Position | PVL years | Teams | Ref. |
|---|---|---|---|---|
| **Jonah Sabete** | OH | 2021–present | Petro Gazz Angels (2019); Sta. Lucia Lady Realtors (2021); Petro Gazz Angels (2022–2025); Nxled Chameleons (2026–present) | |
| **Chie Saet** | S | 2018–present | Petro Gazz Angels (2018–2025); Zus Coffee Thunderbelles (2026–present) | |
| **Dindin Santiago-Manabat** | OPP/MB | 2021–present | Chery Tiggo Crossovers (2021–2022); Akari Chargers (2023–2024); Choco Mucho Flying Titans (2024–present) | |
| Jaja Santiago | MB | 2021; 2026 | Chery Tiggo Crossovers (2021); Creamline Cool Smashers (2026) | |
| **Erika Santos** | OPP | 2022–present | PLDT High Speed Hitters (2022–2025); Cignal HD/Super Spikers (2025–2026); Capital1 Solar Spikers (2026–present) | |
| Manilla Santos | OH | 2019 | Choco Mucho Flying Titans (2019) | |
| **Risa Sato** | MB | 2023–present | BaliPure Purest Water Defenders (2017); Creamline Cool Smashers (2018–2024); Chery Tiggo Crossovers (2025); Akari Chargers (2026–present) | |
| **Fifi Sharma** | MB | 2023–present | Akari Chargers (2023–present) | |
| **Grethcel Soltones** | OH/L | 2017–present | BaliPure Purest Water Defenders (2017); PayMaya High Flyers (2018); Petro Gazz Angels (2020–2024); Akari Chargers (2024–present) | |
| **Grethcel Soltones** | OH/L | 2017–present | BaliPure Purest Water Defenders (2017); PayMaya High Flyers (2018); Petro Gazz Angels (2020–2024); Akari Chargers (2024–present) | |
| **Eli Soyud** | OPP | 2019; 2021–present | Motolite Power Builders (2019); PLDT Home Fibr Power/High Speed Hitters (2021–2023); Akari Chargers (2023–present) | |

== T ==
| Name | Position | PVL years | Teams | Ref. |
|---|---|---|---|---|
| Tin Tiamzon | OH | 2022; 2025–present | F2 Logistics Cargo Movers (2022); Cignal HD/Super Spikers (2025–2026); Akari Chargers (2026–present) | |
| Iris Tolenada | S | 2019; 2022–present | Motolite Power Builders (2019); F2 Logistics Cargo Movers (2022–2023); Capital1 Solar Spikers (2024–2026); Farm Fresh Foxies (2026–present) | |
| Kat Tolentino | OPP | 2019–present | Choco Mucho Flying Titans (2019–present) | |
| Lorene Toring | MB | 2024–present | Farm Fresh Foxies (2024–2026); Choco Mucho Flying Titans (2026–present) | |
| Sheena Toring | MB | 2025–present | Creamline Cool Smashers (2025–present) | |
| Royse Tubino | OH | 2021–present | Philippine Army Lady Troopers (2021–2023); PLDT High Speed Hitters (2023); Choco Mucho Flying Titans (2024–2025); Farm Fresh Foxies (2026–present) | |
| Trisha Tubu | OPP | 2023–present | Farm Fresh Foxies (2023–present) | |

== V ==
| Name | Position | PVL years | Teams | Ref. |
|---|---|---|---|---|
| **Alyssa Valdez** | OH | 2017–present | Creamline Cool Smashers (2017–present) | |
| **Brooke Van Sickle** | OH | 2024–present | Petro Gazz Angels (2024–2025); Nxled Chameleons (2026–present) | |
| **Rosemarie Vargas** | OH | 2017–present | Creamline Cool Smashers (2017–present) | |
| **Caitlin Viray** | OPP | 2020–present | Choco Mucho Flying Titans (2020–2024); Farm Fresh Foxies (2024–2025); Choco Mucho Flying Titans (2026–present) | |

== W ==
| Name | Position | PVL years | Teams | Ref. |
|---|---|---|---|---|
| **Deanna Wong** | L/S | 2021–present | Choco Mucho Flying Titans (2021–present) | |

== See also ==
- List of Philippine men's club volleyball players
- List of Philippine Super Liga players
