= 2024–25 Galeries Tower Highrisers season =

Filipino women's volleyball team season

The 2024–25 Galeries Tower Highrisers season was the second season of the Galeries Tower Highrisers in the Premier Volleyball League (PVL).

In the All-Filipino Conference, despite recording only one win out of 11 matches and earning just five points, Galeries Tower upset the third-seeded Cignal HD Spikers in their qualifying round match to advance to the final round for the first time in franchise history. They were then swept by the Akari Chargers despite putting up a tough fight, with both games going the full length.

== Roster ==
Galeries Tower Highrisers
No.	Player	Position	Height	Birth date	School
1	(Philippines) Alyssa Eroa (C)	Libero	1.50 m (4 ft 11 in)	September 6, 1996 (age 29)	SSC–R
2	(Philippines) Jewel Encarnacion	Outside Hitter	1.68 m (5 ft 6 in)	December 22, 2000 (age 25)	UP
3	(Philippines) Ysabel Jimenez	Opposite Hitter	1.75 m (5 ft 9 in)	November 8, 1999 (age 26)	UST
5	(Philippines) Grazielle Bombita	Outside Hitter	1.70 m (5 ft 7 in)	February 8, 1991 (age 35)	UNC
6	(Philippines) Juliet Catindig	Libero	1.66 m (5 ft 5 in)	July 22, 1999 (age 27)	UE
7	(Philippines) Dimdim Pacres	Opposite Spiker	1.78 m (5 ft 10 in)	September 23, 1997 (age 28)	UST
8	(Philippines) Renee Mabilangan	Setter	1.66 m (5 ft 5 in)	December 29, 2000 (age 25)	NU
9	(Philippines) Audry Paran	Outside Hitter	1.71 m (5 ft 7 in)	December 2, 1997 (age 28)	NU
10	(Philippines) Shannen Palec	Middle Blocker	1.75 m (5 ft 9 in)	September 28, 1996 (age 29)	UST
11	(Philippines) Dodee Batindaan	Middle Blocker	1.72 m (5 ft 8 in)	April 11, 2001 (age 25)	AU
12	(Philippines) Roselle Baliton	Middle Blocker	1.83 m (6 ft 0 in)	March 27, 1997 (age 29)	UE
13	(Philippines) France Ronquillo	Opposite Hitter	1.72 m (5 ft 8 in)	September 15, 1999 (age 26)	NU
14	(Philippines) Andrea Marzan	Middle Blocker	1.80 m (5 ft 11 in)	January 10, 1995 (age 31)	AU
16	(Philippines) Carlota Hernandez	Universal	1.66 m (5 ft 5 in)	April 2, 1999 (age 27)	FEU
17	(Philippines) Fenela Emnas	Setter	1.65 m (5 ft 5 in)	August 28, 1994 (age 31)	AdU
18	(Philippines) Julia Coronel	Setter	1.71 m (5 ft 7 in)	October 5, 2001 (age 24)	DLSU
23	(Philippines) Roma Joy Doromal	Opposite Hitter	1.72 m (5 ft 8 in)	November 23, 1997 (age 28)	NU
25	(Philippines) Jhoana Maraguinot	Outside Hitter	1.76 m (5 ft 9 in)	January 25, 1996 (age 30)	ADMU

Coaching staff
Position	Name
Head Coach	(Philippines) Lerma Giron
Assistant Coach 1	(Kenya) Godfrey Okumu
Strength and Conditioning Coach	(Philippines) Kim Robert Bejo
Trainer	(Philippines) John David Subere
Trainer	(Philippines) Manuel Medina
Physical Therapist	(Philippines) Katherine Ann Tenorio
Team Manager	(Philippines) Jolina Paz Nicolas

== 2024 All-Filipino Conference ==
=== Preliminary round ===
==== Standings ====
Pos	Team	Pld	W	L	Pts	SW	SL	SR	SPW	SPL	SPR
8	Nxled Chameleons	11	4	7	11	14	23	0.609	794	824	0.964
9	Farm Fresh Foxies	11	3	8	11	14	24	0.583	785	863	0.910
10	Galeries Tower Highrisers	11	3	8	9	11	26	0.423	689	832	0.828
11	Capital1 Solar Spikers	11	1	10	4	5	31	0.161	631	860	0.734
12	Strong Group Athletics	11	0	11	0	1	33	0.030	532	844	0.630

Source: TeamPilipinas.info

==== Match log ====
2024 PVL All-Filipino Conference preliminary round match log
Total: 3–8 (9 points)
February: 0–1 (0 points)

Match	Date	Opponent	Sets	Total	Location Attendance	Record	Pts	Report
1	February 22, 2024	PLDT	0–3	37–75	Filoil EcoOil Centre; 908	0–1	0	P2

March: 2–3 (5 points)

Match	Date	Opponent	Sets	Total	Location Attendance	Record	Pts	Report
2	March 2, 2024	Cignal	0–3	47–75	PhilSports Arena; 1,616	0–2	0	P2
3	March 7, 2024	Creamline	0–3	54–75	PhilSports Arena; 964	0–3	0	P2
4	March 12, 2024	Nxled	0–3	54–75	PhilSports Arena; 762	0–4	0	P2
5	March 16, 2024	Capital1	3–2	102–99	Santa Rosa Sports Complex; 5,129	1–4	2	P2
6	March 23, 2024	Strong Group	3–0	75–43	Ynares Center; 3,070	2–4	5	P2

April: 1–4 (4 points)

Match	Date	Opponent	Sets	Total	Location Attendance	Record	Pts	Report
7	April 2, 2024	Choco Mucho	0–3	49–75	PhilSports Arena; 1,021	2–5	5	P2
8	April 6, 2024	Akari	0–3	56–75	Santa Rosa Sports Complex; 4,315	2–6	5	P2
9	April 13, 2024	Farm Fresh	3–0	75–57	PhilSports Arena; 2,523	3–6	8	P2
10	April 20, 2024	Petro Gazz	0–3	45–75	Santa Rosa Sports Complex; 1,607	3–7	8	P2
11	April 25, 2024	Chery Tiggo	2–3	95–108	PhilSports Arena; 2,721	3–8	9	P2

== Draft ==
Round	Pick	Player	Pos.	School
1	3	Julia Coronel	S	DLSU
2	15	Jewel Encarnacion	OH	UP Diliman
3	21	Dodee Batindaan	MB	Arellano
4	23	Danivah Aying	OP	USJ-R

== Reinforced Conference ==
=== Preliminary round ===
==== Standings ====
Pos	Team	Pld	W	L	Pts	SW	SL	SR	SPW	SPL	SPR	Qualification
8	Farm Fresh Foxies	8	3	5	8	11	17	0.647	575	576	0.998	Quarterfinals
9	Choco Mucho Flying Titans	8	2	6	7	11	21	0.524	661	693	0.954	
10	Nxled Chameleons	8	1	7	3	6	23	0.261	510	609	0.837	
11	Galeries Tower Highrisers	8	0	8	4	11	24	0.458	728	842	0.865	
12	Zus Coffee Thunderbelles	8	0	8	0	3	24	0.125	505	657	0.769	

Source: Premier Volleyball League

==== Match log ====
2024 PVL Reinforced Conference preliminary round match log
Total: 0–8 (4 points)
July: 0–3 (2 points)

Match	Date	Opponent	Sets	Total	Location Attendance	Record	Pts	Report
1	July 16, 2024	Nxled	2–3	101–112	PhilSports Arena; 1,517	0–1	1	P2
2	July 20, 2024	PLDT	0–3	52–75	PhilSports Arena; 1,705	0–2	1	P2
3	July 30, 2024	Farm Fresh	2–3	114–123	PhilSports Arena; 992	0–3	2	P2

August: 0–5 (2 points)

Match	Date	Opponent	Sets	Total	Location Attendance	Record	Pts	Report
4	August 3, 2024	Creamline	1–3	99–107	PhilSports Arena; 1,714	0–4	2	P2
5	August 8, 2024	Chery Tiggo	1–3	81–97	PhilSports Arena; 861	0–5	2	P2
6	August 10, 2024	Akari	2–3	97–113	PhilSports Arena; 366	0–6	3	P2
7	August 15, 2024	Cignal	2–3	100–114	SM Mall of Asia Arena; 510	0–7	4	P2
8	August 20, 2024	Capital1	1–3	84–101	Filoil EcoOil Centre; 380	0–8	4	P2

== 2024–25 All-Filipino Conference ==
=== Preliminary round ===
==== Standings ====
Pos	Team	Pld	W	L	Pts	SW	SL	SR	SPW	SPL	SPR	Qualification
8	Chery Tiggo Crossovers	11	5	6	14	20	24	0.833	957	966	0.991	Qualifying round
9	Zus Coffee Thunderbelles	11	4	7	14	20	23	0.870	958	962	0.996	Qualifying round
10	Galeries Tower Highrisers	11	1	10	5	10	30	0.333	835	949	0.880	Qualifying round
11	Capital1 Solar Spikers	11	1	10	5	8	31	0.258	754	926	0.814	Qualifying round
12	Nxled Chameleons	11	1	10	4	9	31	0.290	817	952	0.858	Qualifying round

Source: Premier Volleyball League

==== Match log ====
2024–25 PVL All-Filipino Conference preliminary round match log
Total: 1–10 (5 points)
November: 0–4 (1 point)

Match	Date	Opponent	Sets	Total	Location Attendance	Record	Pts	Report
1	November 9, 2024	Akari	1–3	84–103	PhilSports Arena; 3,049	0–1	0	P2
2	November 14, 2024	Choco Mucho	2–3	105–109	Filoil EcoOil Centre; 590	0–2	1	P2
3	November 19, 2024	PLDT	0–3	70–77	Ynares Center; 388	0–3	1	P2
4	November 28, 2024	Zus Coffee	0–3	57–75	PhilSports Arena; 659	0–4	1	P2

December: 1–1 (4 points)

Match	Date	Opponent	Sets	Total	Location Attendance	Record	Pts	Report
5	December 7, 2024	Capital1	3–0	76–61	Minglanilla Sports Complex; 5,520	1–4	4	P2
6	December 14, 2024	Chery Tiggo	2–3	102–109	PhilSports Arena; 3,095	1–5	5	P2

January: 0–2 (0 points)

Match	Date	Opponent	Sets	Total	Location Attendance	Record	Pts	Report
7	January 21, 2025	Cignal	0–3	56–75	PhilSports Arena; 817	1–6	5	P2
8	January 30, 2025	Farm Fresh	1–3	87–95	PhilSports Arena; 480	1–7	5	P2

February: 1–2 (3 points)

Match	Date	Opponent	Sets	Total	Location Attendance	Record	Pts	Report
9	February 8, 2025	Nxled	1–3	82–94	PhilSports Arena; 1,967	1–8	5	P2
10	February 15, 2025	Petro Gazz	0–3	54–75	Ynares Center; 3,010	1–9	5	P2
11	February 20, 2025	Creamline	0–3	58–76	PhilSports Arena; 1,100	1–10	5	P2

=== Qualifying round ===
==== Match log ====
2024–25 PVL All-Filipino Conference qualifying round match log
Total: 1–0 (3 points)
Qualifying round: 1–0 (3 points)

Date	Opponent	Sets	Total	Location Attendance	Report
February 27, 2025	Cignal	3–1	94–83	PhilSports Arena; 802	P2

=== Final round ===
==== Bracket ====
Quarterfinals
1	Creamline	2
8	Chery Tiggo	0
2	Petro Gazz	2
7	Zus Coffee	1
3	Galeries Tower	0
6	Akari	2
4	PLDT	0
5	Choco Mucho	2

Semifinals
Creamline	6
Petro Gazz	9
Choco Mucho	1
Akari	2

Finals
Championship
Creamline	1
Petro Gazz	2
Third-place
Choco Mucho	1
Akari	2

==== Match log ====
2024–25 PVL All-Filipino Conference final round match log
Total: 0–2 (2 points)
Quarterfinals: 0–2 (2 points)

Match	Date	Opponent	Sets	Total	Location Attendance	Series	Report
1	March 15, 2025	Akari	2–3	96–106	PhilSports Arena; 1,873	0–1	P2
2	March 20, 2025	Akari	2–3	102–100	Ynares Center Antipolo; 2,842	0–2	P2

== Transactions ==
=== Additions ===
Player	Date signed	Previous team	Ref.
Shola Alvarez	January 11, 2024	F2 Logistics Cargo Movers	
France Ronquillo	January 11, 2024	Chery Tiggo Crossovers	
Renee Mabilangan	January 11, 2024	NU Lady Bulldogs (UAAP)	
Alyssa Eroa	January 15, 2024	Marikina Lady Shoemasters (MPVA)	
Roselle Baliton	June 13, 2024	Akari Chargers	
Shannen Palec	June 13, 2024	Marikina Lady Shoemasters (MPVA)	
Julia Coronel	July 9, 2024	DLSU Lady Spikers (UAAP)	
Jewel Encarnacion	July 9, 2024	UP Fighting Maroons (UAAP)	
Dodee Batindaan	July 9, 2024	Arellano Lady Chiefs (NCAA)	
Jhoanna Maraguinot	November 13, 2024	Nxled Chameleons	

=== Subtractions ===
Player	New team	Ref.
Shola Alvarez	Capital1 Solar Spikers	
Julia Angeles	Farm Fresh Foxies	
Danivah Aying	Zus Coffee Thunderbelles	
Mary Anne Esguerra	Nxled Chameleons	
Norielle Ipac	Capital1 Solar Spikers	
Renesa Melgar	Capital1 Solar Spikers	

=== Foreign guest player ===
Team	Foreign player	Moving from	Ref.
Galeries Tower Highrisers	(Brazil) Monique Helena (replaced; did not play)	(Brazil) ABEL Moda Vôlei	
Galeries Tower Highrisers	(Thailand) Sutadta Chuewulim	(Thailand) Diamond Food–Fine Chef	
