= List of 2025–26 Premier Volleyball League season transactions =

The following is a list of transactions that took place during the 2025–26 Premier Volleyball League season and the prior off-season.

== Retirement ==
Date	Name	Team(s)	Notes	Ref.
November 18, 2025	May Luna-Lumahan	Cignal HD Spikers (2021); Chery Tiggo Crossovers (2022–2023); Foton Tornadoes (2023); Nxled Chameleons (2023–2025)	Also played in the Philippine Super Liga from 2018 to 2020.	
January 8, 2026	Rhea Dimaculangan-Villarete	PLDT High Speed Hitters (2021–2024); Creamline Cool Smashers (2025)	Also played in the Philippine Super Liga from 2014 to 2020.	

== Coaching changes ==
Departure date	Team	Outgoing head coach	Reason for departure	Hire date	Incoming head coach	Ref.
December 4, 2025	Farm Fresh Foxies	(Italy) Alessandro Lodi	Stepped down	January 9, 2026	(Japan) Koji Tsuzurabara	
January 8, 2026	Galeries Tower Highrisers	(Kenya) Godfrey Okumu	Replaced	January 8, 2026	(Philippines) Aying Esteban	

== Free agency ==
=== Transfers ===
Player	Date signed	New team	Former team	Ref.
Renee Penafiel	December 3, 2025	Zus Coffee Thunderbelles (Note: The player was initially signed to the Strong Group Athletics organization before being given their team assignments on January 26, 2026.)	Chery Tiggo EV Crossovers	
Cess Robles	December 3, 2025	Zus Coffee Thunderbelles	Chery Tiggo EV Crossovers	
Karen Verdeflor	December 3, 2025	Zus Coffee Thunderbelles	Chery Tiggo EV Crossovers	
Jaila Atienza	January 1, 2026	Choco Mucho Flying Titans	Nxled Chameleons	
Alina Bicar	January 1, 2026	Choco Mucho Flying Titans	Chery Tiggo EV Crossovers	
Caitlin Viray	January 1, 2026	Choco Mucho Flying Titans	Farm Fresh Foxies	
Royse Tubino	January 2, 2026	Farm Fresh Foxies	Choco Mucho Flying Titans	
Bia General	January 3, 2026	Farm Fresh Foxies	Choco Mucho Flying Titans	
Seth Rodriguez	January 3, 2026	PLDT High Speed Hitters	Chery Tiggo EV Crossovers	
Chie Saet	January 4, 2026	Zus Coffee Thunderbelles	Petro Gazz Angels	
Remy Palma	January 5, 2026	Farm Fresh Foxies	Petro Gazz Angels	
Shaya Adorador	January 6, 2026	Capital1 Solar Spikers	Chery Tiggo EV Crossovers	
Imee Hernandez	January 6, 2026	Farm Fresh Foxies	Chery Tiggo EV Crossovers	
Rachel Jorvina	January 6, 2026	Capital1 Solar Spikers	Nxled Chameleons	
Ezra Madrigal	January 6, 2026	Capital1 Solar Spikers	Akari Chargers	
Jasmine Nabor	January 6, 2026	Capital1 Solar Spikers	Chery Tiggo EV Crossovers	
Pauline Gaston	January 7, 2026	Capital1 Solar Spikers	Chery Tiggo EV Crossovers	
Ysa Jimenez	January 7, 2026	Capital1 Solar Spikers	Galeries Tower Highrisers	
Cherry Nunag	January 7, 2026	Capital1 Solar Spikers	Choco Mucho Flying Titans	
Mylene Paat	January 7, 2026	Farm Fresh Foxies	Chery Tiggo EV Crossovers	
France Ronquillo	January 7, 2026	Capital1 Solar Spikers	Galeries Tower Highrisers	
Ara Galang	January 8, 2026	Farm Fresh Foxies	Chery Tiggo EV Crossovers	
Julia Angeles	January 9, 2026	Galeries Tower Highrisers	Zus Coffee Thunderbelles	
Jennifer Nierva	January 9, 2026	Creamline Cool Smashers	Chery Tiggo EV Crossovers	
Ivy Perez	January 9, 2026	Cignal Super Spikers	Galeries Tower Highrisers	
Judith Abil	January 10, 2026	Akari Chargers	Cignal Super Spikers	
Blove Barbon	January 10, 2026	Galeries Tower Highrisers	Petro Gazz Angels	
Cza Carandang	January 10, 2026	Akari Chargers	Chery Tiggo EV Crossovers	
Lycha Ebon	January 10, 2026	Galeries Tower Highrisers	Nxled Chameleons	
Erika Raagas	January 10, 2026	Galeries Tower Highrisers	Akari Chargers	
Jyne Soreño	January 10, 2026	Akari Chargers	Chery Tiggo EV Crossovers	
Erika Deloria	January 11, 2026	Galeries Tower Highrisers	Chery Tiggo EV Crossovers	
Dolly Versoza	January 11, 2026	Galeries Tower Highrisers	Zus Coffee Thunderbelles	
Camille Victoria	January 11, 2026	Galeries Tower Highrisers	Akari Chargers	
Shola Alvarez	January 12, 2026	Galeries Tower Highrisers	Capital1 Solar Spikers	
Shar Ancheta	January 12, 2026	Galeries Tower Highrisers	Zus Coffee Thunderbelles	
Aiza Maizo-Pontillas	January 12, 2026	Galeries Tower Highrisers	Petro Gazz Angels	
Djanel Cheng	January 13, 2026	Nxled Chameleons	Petro Gazz Angels	
Maji Mangulabnan	January 13, 2026	Galeries Tower Highrisers	Nxled Chameleons	
Aby Maraño	January 13, 2026	Nxled Chameleons	Chery Tiggo EV Crossovers	
Ranya Musa	January 13, 2026	Nxled Chameleons	Petro Gazz Angels	
Aduke Ogunsanya	January 13, 2026	Nxled Chameleons	Choco Mucho Flying Titans	
Gayle Pascual	January 13, 2026	Galeries Tower Highrisers	Zus Coffee Thunderbelles	
Jonah Sabete	January 13, 2026	Nxled Chameleons	Petro Gazz Angels	
Jules Samonte	January 13, 2026	Galeries Tower Highrisers	Chery Tiggo EV Crossovers	
Antonette Adolfo	January 14, 2026	Nxled Chameleons	Petro Gazz Angels	
Joyme Cagande	January 14, 2026	Nxled Chameleons	Chery Tiggo EV Crossovers	
Bang Pineda	January 14, 2026	Nxled Chameleons	Petro Gazz Angels	
Jellie Tempiatura	January 14, 2026	Nxled Chameleons	Petro Gazz Angels	
Nicole Tiamzon	January 14, 2026	Nxled Chameleons	Petro Gazz Angels	
Myla Pablo	January 15, 2026	Nxled Chameleons	Petro Gazz Angels	
MJ Phillips	January 15, 2026	Nxled Chameleons	Petro Gazz Angels	
Jules Tolentino	January 15, 2026	Nxled Chameleons	Petro Gazz Angels	
Brooke Van Sickle	January 15, 2026	Nxled Chameleons	Petro Gazz Angels	
Mary Rhose Dapol	January 24, 2026	Akari Chargers	Chery Tiggo EV Crossovers	
Rachel Daquis	January 26, 2026	Zus Coffee Thunderbelles	Farm Fresh Foxies	

=== Returning players ===
Player	Date signed	New team	Former team	Former league	Last season	Ref.
Eya Laure	January 1, 2026	Choco Mucho Flying Titans	Chery Tiggo Crossovers	PVL	2024	
Venice Puzon	January 13, 2026	Galeries Tower Highrisers	Lyceum Lady Pirates	NCAA	2023 (Note: Played for the PLDT High Speed Hitters with a Special Guest License (SGL).)	

=== Going abroad ===
Player	Date signed	New team	New country	Former PVL team	Ref.
Dell Palomata	November 25, 2025 (Note: Via temporary release from PLDT.)	Medan Falcons	Indonesia	PLDT High Speed Hitters	

=== Unsigned ===
Player	Date of departure	Former team	Ref.
Reyann Cañete	December 2, 2025	Chery Tiggo EV Crossovers	
Anngela Nunag	December 2, 2025	Chery Tiggo EV Crossovers	
Risa Sato	December 2, 2025	Chery Tiggo EV Crossovers	
Pau Soriano	December 16, 2025	Creamline Cool Smashers	
Rizza Mandapat	December 29, 2025	Creamline Cool Smashers	
Syd Niegos	January 2, 2026	Capital1 Solar Spikers	
Michelle Morente	January 3, 2026	Creamline Cool Smashers	
Mafe Galanza	January 5, 2026	Creamline Cool Smashers	
Joy Dacoron	January 6, 2026	Petro Gazz Angels	
Marian Andal	January 9, 2026	Galeries Tower Highrisers	
Dodee Batindaan	January 9, 2026	Galeries Tower Highrisers	
Juliet Catindig	January 9, 2026	Galeries Tower Highrisers	
Fen Emnas	January 9, 2026	Galeries Tower Highrisers	
Carly Hernandez	January 9, 2026	Galeries Tower Highrisers	
Andrea Marzan	January 9, 2026	Galeries Tower Highrisers	
Dimdim Pacres	January 9, 2026	Galeries Tower Highrisers	
Shannen Palec	January 9, 2026	Galeries Tower Highrisers	
Audrey Paran	January 9, 2026	Galeries Tower Highrisers	
Lia Pelaga	January 9, 2026	Galeries Tower Highrisers	
