= 2026–27 Galeries Tower Highrisers season =

Filipino women's volleyball team season

The 2026–27 Galeries Tower Highrisers season will be the fourth season of the Galeries Tower Highrisers in the Premier Volleyball League (PVL).

In the PVL on Tour. The Galeries Tower Highrisers opens their PVL on Tour Showdown campaign on July 11, 2026 with a four-sets victory over the Farm Fresh Foxies in Batangas City, Batangas. On August 1, 2026, the Highrisers absorbed a straight-set loss to the Nxled Chameleons in Polomolok, South Cotabato. Galeries Tower ends their preseason caravan with a 1–2 record after absorbing another straight-set loss to the Creamline Cool Smashers on August 22, 2026 in Victorias City, Negros Occidental.

== Roster ==
Galeries Tower Highrisers roster
| No. | Nat. | Player | Pos. | Height | DOB | From |
|---|---|---|---|---|---|---|
| 3 | (Philippines) | Ann Asis | Middle Blocker | 1.70 m (5 ft 7 in) | March 7, 2002 (age 24) | Far Eastern |
| 4 | (Philippines) | Shola Alvarez | Outside Hitter | 1.70 m (5 ft 7 in) | July 11, 1997 (age 29) | José Rizal |
| 6 | (Philippines) | Julia Angeles | Libero | 1.63 m (5 ft 4 in) | September 1, 1998 (age 28) | Letran |
| 7 | (Philippines) | Blove Barbon | Libero | 1.63 m (5 ft 4 in) | April 25, 1999 (age 27) | UST |
| 8 | (Philippines) | Aiza Maizo-Pontillas | Opposite Hitter | 1.78 m (5 ft 10 in) | February 29, 1988 (age 38) | UST |
| 9 | (Philippines) | Gayle Pascual | Outside Hitter | 1.72 m (5 ft 8 in) | September 3, 1999 (age 27) | St. Benilde |
| 10 | (Philippines) | Jean Asis | Middle Blocker | 1.78 m (5 ft 10 in) | August 8, 2002 (age 24) | Far Eastern |
| 11 | (Philippines) | Erika Raagas | Outside Hitter | 1.68 m (5 ft 6 in) | March 30, 2000 (age 26) | Ateneo |
| 12 | (Philippines) | Roselle Baliton (C) | Middle Blocker | 1.83 m (6 ft 0 in) | March 27, 1997 (age 29) | UE |
| 13 | (Philippines) | Camilla Lamina | Setter | 1.66 m (5 ft 5 in) | March 23, 2002 (age 24) | National-U |
| 14 | (Philippines) | Camille Victoria | Opposite Hitter | 1.82 m (6 ft 0 in) | December 26, 1999 (age 26) | UST |
| 15 | (Philippines) | Alyssa Bertolano | Opposite Hitter | 1.67 m (5 ft 6 in) | August 23, 2002 (age 24) | UP |
| 16 | (Philippines) | Dolly Versoza | Libero | 1.65 m (5 ft 5 in) | March 10, 1998 (age 28) | José Rizal |
| 17 | (Philippines) | Erika Deloria | Outside Hitter | 1.69 m (5 ft 7 in) | May 20, 2001 (age 25) | Enderun |
| 23 | (Philippines) | Lycha Ebon | Opposite Hitter | 1.70 m (5 ft 7 in) | October 23, 1999 (age 27) | Far Eastern |
| 24 | (Philippines) | Maji Mangulabnan | Setter | 1.64 m (5 ft 5 in) | March 24, 1999 (age 27) | UST |
| 25 | (Philippines) | Jade Gentapa | Outside Hitter | 1.72 m (5 ft 8 in) | November 28, 2000 (age 25) | St. Benilde |
Updated as of: October 22, 2026 | Source: PVL.ph

Coaching staff

- Head coach:
  Clarence Esteban
- Assistant coaches:
  Rommel Abella
  Franz Damian
  John David Subere
  Lorence Cruz
  John Michael Millado
- Statistician:
  Enzo Miguel Vinarao
  John Emmanuel Dedoroy
- Strength and conditioning coach:
  Kim Robert Bejo

Team staff

- Team manager:
  Rontristan Notado
  Charles John Quimpo
- Team coordinator:
  John Lennard Cruz

Medical staff

- Physical therapist:
  Juan Miguel Duzon

== Draft ==
| Round | Pick | Player | Pos. | School |
|---|---|---|---|---|
| 1 | 1 | Camilla Lamina | S | NU |
| 1 | 10 | Ann Asis | MB | FEU |

The Galeries Tower Highrisers selected Camilla Lamina with the 1st overall pick along with Ann Asis in the second round before passing during the third round.

== PVL on Tour ==
=== Results summary ===
| Team | Game | | |
| Team | 1 | 2 | 3 |
|---|---|---|---|
| Galeries Tower (GTH) | FFF; 3–1 | NXL; 0–3 | CCS; 0–3 |

Source: Premier Volleyball League
Legend: Blue = win; Red = loss

== All-Filipino Conference ==
=== Preliminary round ===
==== Standings ====
| Pos | Team | Pld | W | L | Pts | SW | SL | SR | SPW | SPL | SPR |
|---|---|---|---|---|---|---|---|---|---|---|---|
| 5 | PLDT High Speed Hitters | 8 | 4 | 4 | 13 | 15 | 15 | 1.000 | 677 | 666 | 1.017 |
| 6 | Akari Chargers | 8 | 3 | 5 | 9 | 14 | 19 | 0.737 | 724 | 745 | 0.972 |
| 7 | Capital1 Solar Spikers | 8 | 3 | 5 | 7 | 13 | 21 | 0.619 | 720 | 761 | 0.946 |
| 8 | Zus Coffee Thunderbelles | 7 | 2 | 5 | 7 | 11 | 18 | 0.611 | 591 | 639 | 0.925 |
| 9 | Galeries Tower Highrisers | 8 | 1 | 7 | 4 | 11 | 23 | 0.478 | 683 | 789 | 0.866 |

Updated to match(es) played on November 19, 2026. Source: Premier Volleyball League

==== Match log ====
2026–27 PVL All-Filipino Conference Siklab series preliminary round match log
Total: 1–7 (4 points)
October: 0–4 (0 points)

| Match | Date | Opponent | Sets | Total | Location Attendance | Record | Pts | Report |
|---|---|---|---|---|---|---|---|---|
| 1 | October 10, 2026 | Farm Fresh | 0–3 | 60–75 | Smart Araneta Coliseum; 235 | 0–1 | 0 | P2 |
| 2 | October 17, 2026 | Creamline | 1–3 | 84–102 | Filoil Centre; 1,497 | 0–2 | 0 | P2 |
| 3 | October 22, 2026 | Nxled | 1–3 | 77–97 | SM Mall of Asia Arena; 453 | 0–3 | 0 | P2 |
| 4 | October 27, 2026 | Choco Mucho | 1–3 | 76–96 | Ninoy Aquino Stadium; 635 | 0–4 | 0 | P2 |

November: 1–3 (4 points)

| Match | Date | Opponent | Sets | Total | Location Attendance | Record | Pts | Report |
|---|---|---|---|---|---|---|---|---|
| 5 | November 3, 2026 | Akari | 3–2 | 104–106 | Smart Araneta Coliseum; 426 | 1–4 | 2 | P2 |
| 6 | November 10, 2026 | Zus Coffee | 2–3 | 102–103 | Smart Araneta Coliseum; 139 | 1–5 | 3 | P2 |
| 7 | November 14, 2026 | PLDT | 1–3 | 79–98 | PhilSports Arena; 335 | 1–6 | 3 | P2 |
| 8 | November 19, 2026 | Capital1 | 2–3 | 101–112 | SM Mall of Asia Arena; 408 | 1–7 | 4 | P2 |

== Transactions ==
=== Additions ===
| Player | Date signed | Previous team | Ref. |
|---|---|---|---|
| Alyssa Bertolano | July 2, 2026 | Farm Fresh Foxies | |
| Jade Gentapa | July 3, 2026 | Zus Coffee Thunderbelles | |
| Camilla Lamina | July 6, 2026 | NU Lady Bulldogs (UAAP) | |
| Ann Asis | July 6, 2026 | FEU Lady Tamaraws (UAAP) | |

=== Subtractions ===
| Player | New team | Ref. |
|---|---|---|
| Winnie Bedaña | PLDT High Speed Hitters | |
| Sharya Ancheta | Akari Chargers | |
| Jules Samonte | Retired | . |
| Julia Coronel | Capital1 Solar Spikers | |
