= Premier Volleyball League draft =

Annual draft of volleyball players

The Premier Volleyball League draft is an annual event of the Premier Volleyball League, where the twelve teams of the league can acquire or draft new players who have not previously competed in the league that are eligible and wish to join the club. The inaugural rookie draft was held on July 8, 2024.

With the launch of the rookie draft, teams are now barred from directly hiring players from the collegiate ranks, such as the NCAA, and the UAAP. Players who have previously played in the PVL, including athletes from the NCAA who played with a special guest license (SGL) granted by the Games and Amusements Board (GAB) are allowed to skip the draft.

== Rules and eligibility ==
=== Eligibility requirements ===
To become eligible to apply for the rookie draft, applicants must:

- Be at least 21 years old by December 31 at the year of the annual draft, with no necessity for collegiate playing experience or academic qualifications.
- Secure a Philippine passport before the deadline for submission of draft eligibility requirements for Filipino foreign applicants. They may submit a birth certificate issued in the Philippines in place of the Philippine passport.

=== Timeline of events ===
The following are the events that initiated in the rookie draft.

- Submission of applicants' draft requirements.
- Allowance of a certain number of days for draft withdrawal.
- Announcement of the initial list of applicants.
- Draft lottery day for the four worst-performing teams of the recent conference.
- Mandatory PVL rookie draft combine. A two-day event where applicants underwent physical measures, medical tests, interviews, athletic tests, and scrimmages, all observed by coaches and officials.
- The day of the PVL Rookie draft event.

=== Draft contract ===
Drafted players must obtain qualifying offers from their respective teams within 15 calendar days. First-round picks must be offered a minimum three-year contract. Applicants drafted in the second and later rounds require a minimum one-year contract.

Undrafted players signed by teams must receive at least a one-conference contract.

== Order ==
In determining the draft order, the weighted cumulative ranking of each team is calculated based on their standings from each conference held since the previous draft, with the All-Filipino Conference having the most weight in the calculation. In the first round, the first four picks are determined by lottery, while the remaining teams go in ascending order (lowest to highest) of their cumulative rankings. For the second round onwards, all teams pick in ascending order. Any ties are broken by a separate lottery.

The draft can go for as many rounds as needed, but starting from the second round, teams can pass their selection. Doing so ends the team's draft and cannot select in the succeeding rounds.

=== Draft lottery ===
A draft lottery is held for the four teams with the worst cumulative rankings to prevent teams from deliberately tanking in an attempt to earn the first pick. The probability of the teams' chances of getting the first overall pick are as follows:

- The team with the worst ranking has a 40% chance of winning the first pick,
- The team with the second-worst ranking has a 30% chance,
- The team with the third-worst ranking has a 20% chance, and
- The team with the fourth-worst ranking has a 10% chance.

== List of first overall picks ==
Positions Key
OH	Outside hitter	MB	Middle blocker	OP	Opposite hitter	S	Setter	L	Libero

Draft	Season	Player	Pos.	Selected by	College	Draft venue	PVL rookie statistics							Ref.
Draft	Season	Player	Pos.	Selected by	College	Draft venue	Pts.	Atk.	Blk.	Srv.	Dig.	Set.	Rec.	Ref.
2024	2024–25	Thea Gagate	MB	Zus Coffee	DLSU	Novotel Manila Araneta City, Quezon City	132	32.28%	0.70	0.15	0.30	0.00	0.00%	
2025	2025–26	Bella Belen	OH	Capital1	NU	Novotel Manila Araneta City, Quezon City	342	33.73%	0.28	0.20	3.17	0.00	42.00%	
2026	2026–27	Camilla Lamina	S	Galeries Tower	NU	Novotel Manila Araneta City, Quezon City	To be determined							
