= 2026 Premier Volleyball League draft =

Third edition of the PVL draft

2026 Premier Volleyball League Rookie Draft

General information
- Sport: Volleyball
- Date: June 3, 2026
- Location: Novotel Manila Araneta City, Quezon City
- Network: One Sports

Overview
- 11 total selections in 2 rounds
- League: Premier Volleyball League
- Teams: 9
- First selection: Camilla Lamina (Galeries Tower Highrisers)
- Most selections (2): Capital1 Solar Spikers; Galeries Tower Highrisers; Farm Fresh Foxies

The 2026 Premier Volleyball League draft was the third rookie draft for the Premier Volleyball League, the top-level women's professional volleyball league in the Philippines, it was held on June 3, 2026. The draft was held before the start of the 2026–27 season.

== Key dates ==
Table of key dates
Event	Date(s)
Submission of applicants' draft requirements.	May 22, 2026 (deadline)
Draft lottery day.	May 25, 2026
Rookie draft combine	May 28–29, 2026
Announcement of the list of applicants.	June 1, 2026
PVL Rookie Draft event.	June 3, 2026

== Eligibility and entrants ==
The eligibility requirements from the 2025 draft was retained:

- Female at birth, as indicated in a Philippine Statistics Authority-issued birth certificate
- At least 21 years old on or before December 31, 2026
- Those below 21 years old must be college graduates.
- Filipino-foreign applicants must be holders of a Philippine passport or has a receipt indicating her passport's release before the deadline date.
- Players who played for collegiate teams in the Philippines but not in the UAAP or NCAA should have an endorsement letter from her collegiate coach or athletic director.
- Non UAAP or NCAA players should secure an endorsement letter from a current registered PVL, UAAP or NCAA coach.
- Medical clearance and a notarized declaration of no-pending obligations from a collegiate or club

Eligible players foregoing the 2025 to focus on national team duties cannot directly sign in with a PVL club. They will have to join the succeeding draft to join the PVL.

=== Draft entrants ===
The full list of entrants will be announced on June 1. On May 25, the PVL released an initial list of 42 players enter the draft with 38 entrants confirmed.

==== International league players ====
- Alyssa Solomon – OP, NU / Osaka Marvelous (Japan) – withdrew on May 31

==== UAAP players ====
- Ann Asis – MB, FEU
- Kayce Balingit – OP, UE
- Michelle Beterina –, De La Salle
- KC Cepada – OP, UE
- Tin Ecalla – S/OP, UE
- Taks Fujimoto – S, Ateneo
- Jum Gayo – L, UP Diliman
- Barbie Jamili – OH, Adamson
- Camilla Lamina – S, NU
- Xyza Gula – OH, UST
- Irah Jaboneta – OH, UP Diliman
- Heart Magsombol – S, UP Diliman
- Joan Monares – OH, UP Diliman
- Florize Papa – OH, FEU
- Detdet Pepito – L, UST
- Jonna Perdido – OH, UST
- Ela Raagas – S, De La Salle
- Sophia Sindayen –, De La Salle
- Tin Ubaldo – S, FEU
- Niña Ytang – MB, UP Diliman – withdrew on June 1

==== NCAA players ====
- Marianne Alona – L, JRU
- Fianne Ariola – S, Perpetual
- Gayle Batara – MB, JRU
- Grace Cabadin – OP, Mapúa
- Julienne Castro – OH, Letran
- Kristine Dionisio – MB, San Sebastian
- Johna Dolorito – OH, Lyceum
- Natalie Estreller – S, Letran – withdrew on June 1
- Jericha Lopez - OH, Lyceum
- Christina Marasigan – OP, San Sebastian
- Erin Navarro – MB, San Beda
- Alyanna Ong – MB, Mapúa
- Katherine Santos – OH, San Sebastian
- Lara Mae Silva – L, Letran – withdrew on June 1
- Janeth Tulang – MB, Lyceum

==== Other local-based players ====
- Lyca Dela Peña –, PUP
- Kirsty Destajo – MB, UNC
- Angel Galinato – MB, USC
- Marjorie Orpilla –, ICC
- Jesska Sacay –, ICC

==== Foreign-based players ====
- Jade Fuentes – OH/OP, Cal State Dominguez Hills

== National team commitment ==
There were proposals for the Philippine national team to take part in the draft and get first pick to select players for the national team pool. Selected players cannot play for another club within a two year period. This proposal was later changed with the national team will approach to invite players instead to make an exclusive commitment to the national team. In May 2026, the proposal for a national team draft was not adopted.

Clubs can endorse drafted players to the national team pool. However, the PVL management insist that club approval remains a mandatory prerequisite for national team participation in compliance of "contractual obligations and league regulations". However this raised concern if this conflict with FIVB rules regarding requiring clubs to lend players to the national teams.

Strong Group Athletics has made a commitment for the first and second round pick of its teams Farm Fresh Foxies and Zus Coffee Thunderbelles to the national team pool.

== Combine ==
The draft combine was held at the Gameville Ballpark in Mandaluyong on May 28 and 29. The event saw participation of 42 aspirants. On the first day, anthropometric and performance measurements was held. The following day, participants featured in scrimmages playing in positions listed in their applications.

== Draft order ==
The order of selection is based on each team's results across each conference since the previous draft, with the exception of the 2025 Invitational Conference due to only a selection of teams competing. The formula is adjusted for this draft, with rankings from the 2025 PVL on Tour make up 10% of the weighted ranking, rankings from the 2025 Reinforced Conference make up 15%, and rankings from the 2026 All-Filipino Conference having an increased weight of 75%. Inactive teams are excluded from the calculation.

Teams will pick in ascending order (lowest to highest) based on their respective weighted cumulative rankings. The four teams with the lowest weighted rankings (highlighted below) entered the lottery to determine the order of selection in the first round.

Draft order		Lottery chances	Team	Final ranking			Total
1R	2R and later	Lottery chances	Team	TOUR (10%)	RC (15%)	AFC (75%)	Total
1st	2nd	30%	Galeries Tower Highrisers	12th (1.20)	12th (1.80)	8th (6.00)	9.00
2nd	1st	40%	Capital1 Solar Spikers	11th (1.10)	8th (1.20)	9th (6.75)	9.05
3rd	4th	10%	Choco Mucho Flying Titans	10th (1.00)	9th (1.35)	7th (5.25)	7.60
4th	3rd	20%	Zus Coffee Thunderbelles	7th (0.70)	2nd (0.30)	10th (7.50)	8.50
5th		—N/a	Nxled Chameleons	5th (0.50)	11th (1.65)	5th (3.75)	5.90
6th		—N/a	Akari Chargers	8th (0.80)	3rd (0.45)	6th (4.50)	5.75
7th		—N/a	Farm Fresh Foxies	6th (0.60)	5th (0.75)	4th (3.00)	4.35
8th		—N/a	PLDT High Speed Hitters	1st (0.10)	4th (0.60)	3rd (2.25)	2.95
9th		—N/a	Creamline Cool Smashers	3rd (0.30)	6th (0.90)	1st (0.75)	1.95

== Draft selections ==
During the draft, 11 players were selected in two rounds.

Positions key
OH	Outside hitter	MB	Middle blocker	OP	Opposite hitter	S	Setter	L	Libero

‡	National Team Member
	PVL Premier Team Awardee
★	PVL PC Rookie of the Year
	Rookie of the Conference
Player (in italic text)	Unsigned drafted player

=== 1st round ===
Pick	Player	Pos.	Team	College/University
1	Camilla Lamina	S	Galeries Tower Highrisers	National University
2	Detdet Pepito	L	Capital1 Solar Spikers	University of Santo Tomas
3	Tin Ubaldo	S	Choco Mucho Flying Titans	Far Eastern University
4	Alyanna Ong	MB	Zus Coffee Thunderbelles	Mapúa University
5	Irah Jaboneta	OH	Nxled Chameleons	University of the Philippines
6	Jonna Perdido	OH	Farm Fresh Foxies	University of Santo Tomas
7	Fianne Ariola	S	PLDT High Speed Hitters	University of Perpetual Help System DALTA
8	Barbie Jamili	OH	Creamline Cool Smashers	Adamson University

- Akari passed during the round.

=== 2nd round ===
Pick	Player	Pos.	Team	College/University
9	KC Cepada	OH	Capital1 Solar Spikers	University of the East
10	Ann Asis	MB	Galeries Tower Highrisers	Far Eastern University
11	Ela Raagas	S	Farm Fresh Foxies	De La Salle University

- Zus Coffee, Choco Mucho, Nxled, PLDT and Creamline passed during the round.

=== 3rd round ===
A third round was held, but all remaining teams passed, thus ending the draft.

== Draft lottery ==
The four teams with the lowest weighted rankings entered the draft lottery to determine the order of selection for the first round. The draft lottery was held on May 25, 2026 at the TV5 Media Center in Mandaluyong. As with previous drafts, the lowest-ranked team is given a 40% chance at winning the first pick, the second-lowest is given 30%, the third-lowest is given 20%, and the fourth-lowest is given 10%.

Denotes the actual lottery result

Team	Weighted ranking	Lottery chances	Lottery probabilities			
Team	Weighted ranking	Lottery chances	1st	2nd	3rd	4th
Capital1 Solar Spikers	9.05	40	40.0%	31.6%	20.6%	7.8%
Galeries Tower Highrisers	9.00	30	30.0%	30.8%	26.2%	13.0%
Zus Coffee Thunderbelles	8.50	20	20.0%	24.1%	31.7%	24.1%
Choco Mucho Flying Titans	7.60	10	10.0%	13.5%	21.4%	55.1%

== Acquisitions involving draft picks and undrafted free agents ==
- June 12, 2026: PLDT
  - PLDT acquired Joan Monares, an undrafted and free-agent player.
