= List of Philippine men's club volleyball players =

This article compiles players who have played in Philippine men's club volleyball competitions. These include the Philippine Super Liga (2013–2014), Shakey's V-League (2014), Spikers' Turf (2015–present), and the Maharlika Pilipinas Volleyball Association (2026–present). This list only includes players who have played for the leagues' member teams and does not include guest teams or collegiate teams. (Note: The list also does not include commercial teams that are the result of a collegiate partnership, such as the Megabuilders Volley Bolts / Sta. Elena–NU Ball Hammers/Nationals (2017–2023).) Foreign players are also not included.

Players highlighted in bold are current active players.

== List ==
Name	Position	Playing years	Teams	Ref.
**Ranran Abdilla**	OH	2014–2024; 2026–present	PLDT Home TVolution Power Attackers (2014); Philippine Air Force Air Spikers (2015–2024); Pasay Voyagers (2026–present)	
**Eco Adajar**	S	2023; 2025–present	Santa Rosa City Lions (2023); Cabstars (2023); Criss Cross King Crunchers (2025–present)	
Mark Gil Alfafara	OH/OPP	2015–2017	PLDT Home Ultera Ultra Fast Hitters (2015); Philippine Air Force Air Spikers (2016); Cignal HD Spikers (2017)	
**Nico Almendras**	OH	2024–present	Criss Cross King Crunchers (2024–present)	
**Hero Austria**	OH	2023–present	Imus City–AJAA Spikers (2023); Santa Rosa City Lions (2023); Savouge Spin Doctors (2024–present)	
Bryan Bagunas	OH	2019; 2024–2025	Philippine Air Force Jet Spikers (2019); Cignal HD Spikers (2024–2025)	
**John Paul Bugaoan**	MB	2018–present	Vice Co. Blockbusters (2018); Cignal HD/Super Spikers (2019–2025); Savouge Spin Doctors (2026–present)	
**Kim Dayandante**	S	2023–2024; 2026–present	AMC Cotabato Spikers (2023); D'Navigators Iloilo (2024); Savouge Spin Doctors (2026–present)	
John Vic De Guzman	OPP	2018–2019	PLDT Home Fibr Ultra Fast/Power Hitters (2018–2019)	
Jade Disquitado	OH	2023	D'Navigators Iloilo (2023)	
Pitrus de Ocampo	S	2013; 2015–2024	Giligan's Sisig Kings (2013); Philippine Air Force Air Spikers (2015–2024)	
Marck Espejo	OH	2015; 2018–2024	Cagayan Valley Rising Suns (2015); Cignal HD Spikers (2018–2023); Criss Cross King Crunchers (2024)	
**Madz Gampong**	OH	2023–present	AMC Cotabato Spikers (2023); Cignal HD Spikers (2024); Savouge Spin Doctors (2025–present)	
**Jude Garcia**	OH	2018–2019; 2024–present	Vice Co. Blockbusters (2018); Cignal HD Spikers (2019); Criss Cross King Crunchers (2024–present)	
Richard Gomez				
**Rex Intal**	MB	2017–present	Cignal HD Spikers (2017–2022); AMC Cotabato Spikers (2023); Criss Cross King Crunchers (2024–present)	
Fauzi Ismail	OH/OPP	2016; 2018; 2022–2023	Philippine Air Force Air Spikers (2016; 2018); Cignal HD Spikers (2018); AMC Cotabato Spikers (2023)	
**Lloyd Josafat**	MB	2022–present	AMC Cotabato Spikers (2023); Cignal HD/Super Spikers (2024–2025); Criss Cross King Crunchers (2026–present)	
Jack Kalingking	MB	2018–2023; 2025	Vice Co. Blockbusters (2018); Philippine Navy Sea Lions (2018–2023; 2025)	
Noel Kampton	OH	2025	Criss Cross King Crunchers (2025)	
**Rodolfo Labrador**	MB	2014–2023; 2026–present	PLDT Home TVolution Power Attackers (2014); Philippine Air Force Air Spikers (2015–2023); Pasay Voyagers (2026–present)	
**Jessie Lopez**	S	2014–2023; 2026–present	PLDT Home TVolution Power Attackers (2014); Philippine Air Force Air Spikers (2015–2023); Pasay Voyagers (2026–present)	
**Vince Lorenzo**	L	2022–present	AMC Cotabato Spikers (2023); D' Navigators Iloilo (2023–2024); Cignal HD/Super Spikers (2024–2025); AEP Cabstars (2026); Savouge Spin Doctors (2026–present)	
Chris Macasaet	MB			
**Kim Malabunga**	MB	2017–present	Philippine Air Force Air Spikers (2017); Vice Co. Blockbusters (2018); Philippine Air Force Air Spikers (2019); VNS Griffins (2022); Imus City–AJAA Spikers (2023); Criss Cross King Crunchers (2024–present)	
Vince Mangulabnan	S	2016–2019; 2023–2024	Cignal HD Spikers (2016–2019); AMC Cotabato Spikers (2023); Criss Cross King Crunchers (2024)	
**Ysay Marasigan**	OPP	2016–present	Cignal HD Spikers (2016–2023); Criss Cross King Crunchers (2024–present)	
**Rikko Marmeto**	OH	2018–2019; 2023; 2025–present	Vice Co. Blockbusters (2018); Cignal HD Spikers (2018); Philippine Air Force Air Spikers (2019); Imus City–AJAA Spikers (2023); Santa Rosa City Lions (2023); Savouge Spin Doctors (2025–present)	
Howard Mojica	OH	2014; 2016	Cignal HD Spikers (2014); Philippine Air Force Air Spikers (2016)	
AJ Pareja	MB			
Jan Berlin Paglinawan	OH/OPP	2015–2018	Champion Supra Smashers / Sta. Elena Construction Wrecking Balls (2015–2017); Vice Co. Blockbusters (2018)	
Peter Quiel	MB			
**Louie Ramirez**	OH/OPP	2022–present	Cignal HD Spikers (2022); Imus City–AJAA Spikers (2023); Cignal HD/Super Spikers (2024–2025); Savouge Spin Doctors (2026–present)	
Owa Retamar	S	2024–2025	Cignal HD/Super Spikers (2024–2025)	
Steve Rotter	OPP	2023–2025	AMC Cotabato Spikers (2023); Cignal HD/Super Spikers (2024–2025)	
**Francis Saura**	MB/OPP	2019; 2023–present	Philippine Air Force Air Spikers (2019); Imus City–AJAA Spikers (2023); D'Navigators Iloilo (2023–2024); Criss Cross King Crunchers (2024–present)	
**Jayvee Sumagaysay**	MB	2017–present	Philippine Army Troopers (2017); PLDT Home Fibr Power Hitters (2018–2019); Team Dasma Monarchs (2021); AMC Cotabato Spikers (2022–2023); D'Navigators Iloilo (2024); VNS Griffins (2025–2026); Dasmariñas City Monarchs (2026–present)	
**Manuel Sumanguid III**	L	2019–present	Cignal HD Spikers (2019–2023); Criss Cross King Crunchers (2024–present)	
Peter Torres	MB	2015–2024	Cagayan Valley Rising Suns (2015); Cignal HD Spikers (2016–2024)	
**Joshua Umandal**	OH	? 2022–present	PLDT (?); AMC Cotabato Spikers (2023); Cignal HD Spikers (2023–2025); Alpha Insurance Protectors (2026); Imus Arsenal (2026–present)	
**Adrian Villados**	S	2024–present	Criss Cross King Crunchers (2024–present)	

== See also ==
- List of Premier Volleyball League players
- List of Philippine Super Liga players
