= List of Philippine Super Liga players =

This article compiles players who have played in the Philippine Super Liga, a defunct women's volleyball league in the Philippines. This list only includes players who have played for the league's member teams and does not include guest teams, collegiate teams, or beach volleyball squads. (Note: The list also does not include commercial teams that are the result of a collegiate partnership such as the Cherrylume Iron Lady Warriors (2017)) Foreign players are also not included, as well as any men's division players.

Players highlighted in bold are current active players in the Premier Volleyball League.

== A ==
Name	Position	PSL years	Teams	Ref.
**Shaya Adorador**	OH	2018–2020	Foton Tornadoes / Chery Tiggo Crossovers (2018–2020)	

== B ==
Name	Position	PSL years	Teams	Ref.
Ging Balse	MB	2014–2020	Philippine Army Lady Troopers (2014; 2016); Cocolife Asset Managers (2017–2018); Smart Giga Hitters (2018); Philippine Army Lady Troopers (2019); Petron Blaze Spikers (2020)	
**Majoy Baron**	MB	2015–2020	Meralco Power Spikers (2015); F2 Logistics Cargo Movers (2016–2020)	

== C ==
Name	Position	PSL years	Teams	Ref.
Fille Cayetano	OH	2013–2016	Petron Blaze Spikers (2013–2016); Meralco Power Spikers (2015)	
**Djanel Cheng**	S	2015–2018	Shopinas.com Lady Clickers (2015); Cignal HD Spikers (2016); F2 Logistics Cargo Movers (2016); Sta. Lucia Lady Realtors (2017–2018)	
Des Clemente-de Guzman	MB	2018–2020	F2 Logistics Cargo Movers (2018–2020)	
Cha Cruz-Behag	OH	2014–2020	AirAsia Flying Spikers (2014); Generika Lifesavers (2014); Shopinas.com Lady Clickers (2015); Meralco Power Spikers (2015); Cignal HD Spikers (2015); F2 Logistics Cargo Movers (2016–2020)	

== D ==
Name	Position	PSL years	Teams	Ref.
**Rachel Daquis**	OH	2013–2020	Philippine Army Lady Troopers (2013); Generika Lifesavers (2015); Petron Tri-Activ Spikers (2016); Philippine Army Lady Troopers (2016); Cignal HD Spikers (2017–2020)	
Cyd Demecillo	OH	2015–2016	Meralco Power Spikers (2015); F2 Logistics Cargo Movers (2016)	
Rhea Dimaculangan	S	2014–2020	RC Cola–Air Force Raiders (2014–2015); Foton Tornadoes (2015–2017); Petron Blaze Spikers (2017–2019); Generika–Ayala Lifesavers (2020)	
**Angelique Dionela**	L	2013–2020	Cagayan Valley Lady Rising Suns (2013); Cignal HD Spikers (2013–2020)	
**Kim Kianna Dy**	OPP/MB	2015–2020	Shopinas.com Lady Clickers (2015); Meralco Power Spikers (2015); F2 Logistics Cargo Movers (2020)	

== F ==
Name	Position	PSL years	Teams	Ref.
**Kim Fajardo**	S	2015–2020	Meralco Power Spikers (2015); F2 Logistics Cargo Movers (2016–2020)	
Jem Ferrer	S	2014–2015	PLDT Power Attackers/Turbo Boosters/Ultra Fast Hitters (2014–2015)	

== G ==
- (Philippines) Ara Galang
- (Philippines) Dzi Gervacio
- (Philippines) Melissa Gohing
- (Philippines) Jovelyn Gonzaga
- (Philippines) Michele Gumabao

== H ==
- (Philippines) Gretchen Ho

== M ==
- (Philippines) Dawn Macandili
- (Philippines) Aiza Maizo-Pontillas
- (Philippines) Rizza Mandapat
- (Philippines) Aby Maraño
- (Philippines) Janine Marciano
- (Philippines) Stephanie Mercado
- (United States) Alexa Micek
- (Philippines) Frances Molina
- (Philippines) Jed Montero
- (Philippines) Maica Morada

== N ==
- (Philippines) Anngela Nunag

== O ==
- (Philippines) Maika Ortiz

== P ==
- (Philippines) Myla Pablo
- (Philippines) Jeanette Panaga
- (Philippines) Tatan Pantone
- (Philippines) Bang Pineda

== R ==
- (Philippines) Jennylyn Reyes
- (Philippines) Mika Reyes
- (Philippines) Sue Roces

== S ==
- (Philippines) Jonah Sabete
- (Philippines) Chie Saet
- (Philippines) Dindin Santiago-Manabat
- (Philippines) Tina Salak
- (Philippines) Jaja Santiago
- (Philippines) Wendy Semana
- (Philippines) Pau Soriano
- (Philippines) Grethcel Soltones
- (Philippines) Charo Soriano
- (United States) Lindsay Stalzer
- (Philippines) Gyzelle Sy

== T ==
- (Philippines) Angeli Tabaquero
- (Philippines) Shaya Adorador
- (Philippines) Nicole Tiamzon
- (Philippines) Wensh Tiu
- (United States) Iris Tolenada
- (Philippines) Royse Tubino
- (Philippines) Carmela Tunay

== V ==
- (Philippines) Rosemarie Vargas

== See also ==
- List of Premier Volleyball League players
- List of Philippine men's club volleyball players
