= 2025 Premier Volleyball League Reinforced Conference =

Third conference of the 2024–25 PVL season

- Duration: October 7 – November 30, 2025
- Teams: 12
- Matches: 56
- Attendance: 97,669 (1,744 per match)
- TV partner(s): One Sports; One Sports+; RPTV
- Streaming partner(s): Pilipinas Live

Results
- Champions: Petro Gazz Angels
- Runners-up: Zus Coffee Thunderbelles
- Third place: Akari Chargers
- Fourth place: PLDT High Speed Hitters

Awards
- Conference MVP: Brooke Van Sickle
- Finals MVP: MJ Phillips
- Best OH: Brooke Van Sickle; Savi Davison
- Best MB: Maddie Madayag; Jeanette Panaga
- Best OPP: Trisha Tubu
- Best Setter: Cloanne Mondoñedo
- Best Libero: Thang Ponce

PVL Reinforced Conference chronology
- < 2024 2026 >

PVL conference chronology
- < 2025 Invitational 2026 All-Filipino >

The 2025 Premier Volleyball League Reinforced Conference was the second conference of the 2025–26 Premier Volleyball League season and the third tournament of the season. The sixth Reinforced Conference featured twelve teams with one foreign guest player allowed on each team. The tournament began on October 7, and ran until November 30, 2025. It was held following the Philippines' hosting of the 2025 FIVB Men's Volleyball World Championship.

This was the last conference for the Chery Tiggo Crossovers before they disbanded on December 2, 2025.

== Participating teams ==
Ahead of this conference, the Chery Tiggo Crossovers were renamed to the Chery Tiggo EV Crossovers. On October 8, the Cignal HD Spikers announced it had changed its name to Cignal Super Spikers.

2025 Premier Volleyball League Reinforced Conference
Abbr.	Team	Affiliation	Head coach	Team captain
AKA	Akari Chargers	Akari Lighting & Technology	(Philippines) Tina Salak	Justine Jazareno
CAP	Capital1 Solar Spikers	CapitalOne Energy Corp.	(Brazil) Jorge de Brito	Roma Mae Doromal
CTC	Chery Tiggo EV Crossovers	United Asia Automotive Group	(Philippines) Norman Miguel	Aby Maraño
CMF	Choco Mucho Flying Titans	Republic Biscuit Corporation	(Philippines) Dante Alinsunurin	Desiree Cheng
CSS	Cignal Super Spikers	Cignal TV, Inc.	(Philippines) Shaq Delos Santos	Gel Cayuna
CCS	Creamline Cool Smashers	Republic Biscuit Corporation	(Philippines) Sherwin Meneses	Alyssa Valdez
FFF	Farm Fresh Foxies	Farm Fresh Philippine International / Strong Group Athletics	(Italy) Alessandro Lodi	Louie Romero
GTH	Galeries Tower Highrisers	Grand Taipan Land Development	(Kenya) Godfrey Okumu	Roselle Baliton
NXL	Nxled Chameleons	Akari Lighting & Technology	(Italy) Ettore Guidetti	Chiara Permentilla
PGA	Petro Gazz Angels	PetroGazz Ventures Phils.	(United States) Gary Van Sickle	Remy Palma
HSH	PLDT High Speed Hitters	PLDT Inc.	(Philippines) Rald Ricafort	Kath Arado
ZUS	Zus Coffee Thunderbelles	Zuspresso Sdn. Bhd. / Strong Group Athletics	(Philippines) Jerry Yee	Cloanne Mondoñedo

== Venues ==
Regular venues

All rounds	Preliminaries		
Quezon City	Pasay	Rodriguez, Rizal	San Juan
Smart Araneta Coliseum (SAC)	SM Mall of Asia Arena (MOA)	Ynares Center II (YC2)	Filoil Centre (FIL)
Capacity: 20,000	Capacity: 20,000	Capacity: 8,000	Capacity: 6,000

PVL on Tour venues

Preliminaries
Candon, Ilocos Sur	Dasmariñas, Cavite	Ilagan, Isabela
Candon City Arena (CCA)	City of Dasmariñas Arena (COD)	Capital Arena (ILA)
Capacity: 8,000	Capacity: 5,000	Capacity: 10,000

== Transactions ==
=== Team additions and transfers ===
The following are the players who transferred to another team for the upcoming conference.

Player	Moving from	Moving to	Ref.
Jewel Encarnacion	Galeries Tower Highrisers	Cignal Super Spikers	
Michelle Morente	Petro Gazz Angels	Creamline Cool Smashers	

=== National team players ===
A Philippines women's national team pool was previously announced for the 2025 SEA Games in October 2025. However, this was later scrapped. The PVL clubs are encouraged but not obligated to release players for the tournament.

Additionally, Sisi Rondina (Choco Mucho) and Bernadeth Pons (Creamline) remained unvailable due to a leave of absence to train for the national beach volleyball team for the 2025 SEA Games.

=== Foreign guest players ===
The following were the foreign guest players for the upcoming conference. Each team was only allowed to have one foreign player, and could only replace them mid-conference if they suffer from injuries or if the player (not the team) abandons their commitment.

However, the Philippine National Volleyball Federation blocked the issuance of international transfer certificates (ITCs), rendering the guest players unable to play for the teams until the ITCs were approved. All teams were affected by the issue. On October 8, the guest players as well as Filipino players still affiliated with a foreign national federation had their ITCs approved.

Team	Foreign player	Moving from	Ref.
Akari Chargers	(United States) Annie Michem	(Indonesia) Jakarta Livin' Mandiri	
Capital1 Solar Spikers	(Ukraine) Oleksandra Bytsenko	(Japan) Aranmare Yamagata	
Chery Tiggo EV Crossovers	(Cuba) Yunieska Batista	(Turkey) Yesilyurt Spor Kulūbū	
Choco Mucho Flying Titans	(United States) Anyse Smith	(Thailand) Nakhon Ratchasima QminC VC	
Cignal Super Spikers	(Greece) Eva Chantava (replaced; played 2-games)	(Nepal) Karnali Yashvis	
Cignal Super Spikers	(Slovakia) Katrin Trebichavská	(United States) SUNY Buffalo	
Creamline Cool Smashers	(United States) Courtney Schwan	(United States) Orlando Valkyries	
Farm Fresh Foxies	(Belgium) Helene Rousseaux	(Turkey) Papara Göztepe	
Galeries Tower Highrisers	(Montenegro) Jelena Cvijović	(Greece) EA Larissa	
Nxled Chameleons	(Spain) Paola Martinez Vela	(Romania) Dinamo Bucureşti	
Petro Gazz Angels	(United States) Lindsey Vander Weide	(United States) Orlando Valkyries	
PLDT High Speed Hitters	(Russia) Anastasiia Bavykina	(United States) Columbus Fury	
Zus Coffee Thunderbelles	(United States) Anna DeBeer	(United States) Indy Ignite	

=== Coaching changes ===
Team	Outgoing coach	Manner of departure	Replaced by	Ref.
Galeries Tower Highrisers	(Philippines) Lerma Giron	Replaced	(Kenya) Godfrey Okumu	
Petro Gazz Angels	(Philippines) Brian Esquibel	Replaced	(United States) Gary Van Sickle	

== Format ==
The 2025 Reinforced Conference retained the format used in the 2024 edition:

First round

- The preliminary round was split into two rounds.
- In the first round, the twelve teams were divided into two pools of six teams each.
- The first round was a single round-robin tournament, with each team playing one match against all other teams in their pool for a total of five matches. Teams were ranked using the FIVB Ranking System.

Second round

- In the second round, teams were assigned to new pools based on results from the first round. The top three teams from one pool were grouped with the bottom three teams from the other pool.
- Results from the first round were carried over, and teams only played against opponents who they haven't faced in the first round for an additional three matches. By the end of the second round, all teams will have played a total of eight matches. Teams continued to be ranked using the FIVB Ranking System.
- The top eight teams based on combined records across the two rounds advanced to the quarterfinals.
- Teams ranked 9th to 12th were eliminated and ranked accordingly in the final standings.

Quarterfinals

- The quarterfinals featured single-elimination matches, with the winners of each advancing to the semifinals.
- The eight qualified teams were seeded based on their preliminary round results.
- The match-ups were as follows:
  - QF1: #1 vs. #8
  - QF2: #2 vs. #7
  - QF3: #3 vs. #6
  - QF4: #4 vs. #5
- The losing teams were eliminated and be ranked 5th to 8th in the final standings based on their preliminary round results.

Semifinals

- The semifinals also featured single-elimination matches. The winners advanced to the championship match while the losers would play in the third-place match.
- The match-ups were as follows:
  - SF1: QF1 winner vs. QF4 winner
  - SF2: QF2 winner vs. QF3 winner

Finals

- Both the championship (gold medal) and third place (bronze medal) matches were single-elimination.
- The match-ups were as follows:
  - Championship match: Semifinal round winners
  - Third-place match: Semifinal round losers

== Pool standing procedure ==
- First, teams are ranked by the number of matches won.
- If the number of matches won is tied, the tied teams are then ranked by match points, wherein:
  - Match won 3–0 or 3–1: 3 match points for the winner, 0 match points for the loser.
  - Match won 3–2: 2 match points for the winner, 1 match point for the loser.
- In case of any further ties, the following criteria shall be used:
  - Set ratio: the number of sets won divided by number of sets lost.
  - Point ratio: number of points scored divided by number of points allowed.
  - Head-to-head standings: any remaining tied teams are ranked based on the results of head-to-head matches involving the teams in question.

== First round ==
- All times are Philippine Standard Time (UTC+08:00).
- On October 8, the league announced that the two matches played on October 7 would be replayed after foreign guest players were given clearance from the Philippine National Volleyball Federation (PNVF) to take part in the conference. The games were replayed on November 4.

=== Pool A ===
Pos	Team	Pld	W	L	Pts	SW	SL	SR	SPW	SPL	SPR	Qualification
1	PLDT High Speed Hitters	5	4	1	12	12	4	3.000	382	341	1.120	Pool D
2	Farm Fresh Foxies	5	4	1	12	13	6	2.167	441	410	1.076	Pool D
3	Capital1 Solar Spikers	5	3	2	9	10	7	1.429	406	387	1.049	Pool D
4	Choco Mucho Flying Titans	5	2	3	6	7	10	0.700	381	394	0.967	Pool C
5	Cignal Super Spikers	5	2	3	5	7	11	0.636	391	410	0.954	Pool C
6	Nxled Chameleons	5	0	5	1	4	15	0.267	397	456	0.871	Pool C

Source: Premier Volleyball League

Date	Time	Venue		Score		Set 1	Set 2	Set 3	Set 4	Set 5	Total	Report
Oct. 7 (Note: The results of the Capital1–Choco Mucho and Zus Coffee–Akari matches that were played on October 7 were nullified on October 8. The matches were replayed with foreign guest players on November 4.)	18:30	YC2	Capital1 Solar Spikers	0–3	Choco Mucho Flying Titans	31–33	24–26	23–25			78–84	P2
Oct. 9	18:30	COD	Farm Fresh Foxies	3–1	Nxled Chameleons	22–25	25–23	25–19	25–21		97–88	P2
Oct. 13	16:00	SAC	PLDT High Speed Hitters	3–0	Capital1 Solar Spikers	25–22	25–20	25–23			75–65	P2
Oct. 13	18:30	SAC	Choco Mucho Flying Titans	3–1	Cignal Super Spikers	23–25	25–19	25–16	27–25		100–85	P2
Oct. 16	13:30	SAC	Cignal Super Spikers	0–3	Farm Fresh Foxies	19–25	20–25	16–25			55–75	P2
Oct. 16	16:00	SAC	Capital1 Solar Spikers	3–1	Nxled Chameleons	25–20	23–25	27–25	25–12		100–82	P2
Oct. 16	18:30	SAC	PLDT High Speed Hitters	3–0	Choco Mucho Flying Titans	25–21	25–20	25–19			75–60	P2
Oct. 21	13:30	SAC	Farm Fresh Foxies	3–1	Capital1 Solar Spikers	25–22	22–25	25–21	25–22		97–90	P2
Oct. 21	16:00	SAC	Choco Mucho Flying Titans	3–0	Nxled Chameleons	25–23	25–19	25–22			75–64	P2
Oct. 21	18:30	SAC	Cignal Super Spikers	3–0	PLDT High Speed Hitters	25–17	25–22	25–21			75–60	P2
Oct. 25	16:00	YC2	Nxled Chameleons	2–3	Cignal Super Spikers	21–25	25–23	25–20	15–25	14–16	100–109	P2
Oct. 25	18:30	YC2	PLDT High Speed Hitters	3–1	Farm Fresh Foxies	22–25	25–23	25–14	25–16		97–78	P2
Oct. 31	13:30	FIL	Cignal Super Spikers	0–3	Capital1 Solar Spikers	23–25	23–25	21–25			67–75	P2
Oct. 31	16:00	FIL	Farm Fresh Foxies	3–1	Choco Mucho Flying Titans	25–18	25–13	18–25	26–24		94–80	P2
Oct. 31	18:30	FIL	Nxled Chameleons	0–3	PLDT High Speed Hitters	22–25	21–25	20–25			63–75	P2
Nov. 4	18:30	MOA	Capital1 Solar Spikers	3–0	Choco Mucho Flying Titans	25–23	26–24	25–19			76–66	P2

=== Pool B ===
Pos	Team	Pld	W	L	Pts	SW	SL	SR	SPW	SPL	SPR	Qualification
1	Zus Coffee Thunderbelles	5	5	0	14	15	4	3.750	455	378	1.204	Pool C
2	Creamline Cool Smashers	5	3	2	10	12	8	1.500	464	425	1.092	Pool C
3	Akari Chargers	5	3	2	9	13	10	1.300	496	485	1.023	Pool C
4	Petro Gazz Angels	5	3	2	8	10	9	1.111	424	415	1.022	Pool D
5	Chery Tiggo EV Crossovers	5	1	4	4	8	12	0.667	425	444	0.957	Pool D
6	Galeries Tower Highrisers	5	0	5	0	0	15	0.000	248	375	0.661	Pool D

Source: Premier Volleyball League

Date	Time	Venue		Score		Set 1	Set 2	Set 3	Set 4	Set 5	Total	Report
Oct. 7	16:00	YC2	Zus Coffee Thunderbelles	3–2	Akari Chargers	24–26	25–23	17–25	26–24	15–7	107–105	P2
Oct. 9	16:00	COD	Galeries Tower Highrisers	0–3	Petro Gazz Angels	21–25	19–25	14–25			54–75	P2
Oct. 11	16:00	COD	Chery Tiggo EV Crossovers	1–3	Zus Coffee Thunderbelles	15–25	25–20	20–25	23–25		83–95	P2
Oct. 11	18:30	COD	Akari Chargers	3–2	Creamline Cool Smashers	23–25	25–23	30–28	23–25	15–12	116–113	P2
Oct. 14	13:30	SAC	Chery Tiggo EV Crossovers	2–3	Akari Chargers	11–25	25–22	27–29	25–17	7–15	95–108	P2
Oct. 14	16:00	SAC	Zus Coffee Thunderbelles	3–0	Galeries Tower Highrisers	25–22	25–16	25–16			75–54	P2
Oct. 14	18:30	SAC	Creamline Cool Smashers	3–1	Petro Gazz Angels	25–20	25–21	17–25	25–20		92–86	P2
Oct. 18	16:00	ILA	Petro Gazz Angels	3–1	Chery Tiggo EV Crossovers	25–15	20–25	25–23	25–21		95–84	P2
Oct. 18	18:30	ILA	Galeries Tower Highrisers	0–3	Creamline Cool Smashers	9–25	11–25	15–25			35–75	P2
Oct. 23	13:30	FIL	Chery Tiggo EV Crossovers	3–0	Galeries Tower Highrisers	25–9	25–16	25–23			75–48	P2
Oct. 23	16:00	FIL	Akari Chargers	2–3	Petro Gazz Angels	27–29	22–25	25–19	25–17	11–15	110–105	P2
Oct. 23	18:30	FIL	Creamline Cool Smashers	1–3	Zus Coffee Thunderbelles	27–25	17–25	20–25	22–25		86–100	P2
Oct. 28	13:30	FIL	Galeries Tower Highrisers	0–3	Akari Chargers	11–25	23–25	23–25			57–75	P2
Oct. 28	16:00	FIL	Petro Gazz Angels	0–3	Zus Coffee Thunderbelles	22–25	21–25	20–25			63–75	P2
Oct. 28	18:30	FIL	Creamline Cool Smashers	3–1	Chery Tiggo EV Crossovers	23–25	25–23	25–23	25–17		98–88	P2
Nov. 4	16:00	MOA	Zus Coffee Thunderbelles	3–2	Akari Chargers	23–25	22–25	25–23	25–12	15–7	110–92	P2

== Second round ==
- All times are Philippine Standard Time (UTC+08:00).

=== Pool C ===
Pos	Team	Pld	W	L	Pts	SW	SL	SR	SPW	SPL	SPR	Qualification
1	Zus Coffee Thunderbelles	8	7	1	20	21	8	2.625	688	596	1.154	Quarterfinals
2	Creamline Cool Smashers	8	5	3	17	20	12	1.667	729	661	1.103	Quarterfinals
3	Cignal Super Spikers	8	5	3	13	16	14	1.143	672	650	1.034	Quarterfinals
4	Akari Chargers	8	4	4	12	18	16	1.125	749	731	1.025	Quarterfinals
5	Choco Mucho Flying Titans	8	3	5	9	11	17	0.647	621	660	0.941	
6	Nxled Chameleons	8	0	8	1	5	24	0.208	576	701	0.822	

Source: Premier Volleyball League

Date	Time	Venue		Score		Set 1	Set 2	Set 3	Set 4	Set 5	Total	Report
Nov. 6	16:00	FIL	Creamline Cool Smashers	3–1	Nxled Chameleons	20–25	25–13	25–16	25–18		95–72	P2
Nov. 6	18:30	FIL	Akari Chargers	1–3	Cignal Super Spikers	21–25	25–23	20–25	20–25		86–98	P2
Nov. 8	18:30	CCA	Zus Coffee Thunderbelles	3–1	Choco Mucho Flying Titans	25–20	25–22	24–26	25–19		99–87	P2
Nov. 13	13:30	SAC	Cignal Super Spikers	3–0	Zus Coffee Thunderbelles	25–12	26–24	25–23			76–59	P2
Nov. 13	16:00	SAC	Nxled Chameleons	0–3	Akari Chargers	13–25	17–25	22–25			52–75	P2
Nov. 13	18:30	SAC	Choco Mucho Flying Titans	0–3	Creamline Cool Smashers	17–25	17–25	23–25			57–75	P2
Nov. 18	13:30	YC2	Zus Coffee Thunderbelles	3–0	Nxled Chameleons	25–13	25–21	25–21			75–55	P2
Nov. 18	16:00	YC2	Akari Chargers	1–3	Choco Mucho Flying Titans	23–25	25–21	23–25	21–25		92–96	P2
Nov. 18	18:30	YC2	Creamline Cool Smashers	2–3	Cignal Super Spikers	18–25	25–20	25–22	16–25	11–15	95–107	P2

=== Pool D ===
Pos	Team	Pld	W	L	Pts	SW	SL	SR	SPW	SPL	SPR	Qualification
1	Farm Fresh Foxies	8	7	1	21	22	7	3.143	694	618	1.123	Quarterfinals
2	PLDT High Speed Hitters	8	6	2	18	19	9	2.111	669	591	1.132	Quarterfinals
3	Capital1 Solar Spikers	8	4	4	13	16	14	1.143	660	688	0.959	Quarterfinals
4	Petro Gazz Angels	8	5	3	14	17	14	1.214	718	669	1.073	Quarterfinals
5	Chery Tiggo EV Crossovers	8	2	6	6	12	20	0.600	673	724	0.930	
6	Galeries Tower Highrisers	8	0	8	0	2	24	0.083	465	635	0.732	

Source: Premier Volleyball League

Date	Time	Venue		Score		Set 1	Set 2	Set 3	Set 4	Set 5	Total	Report
Nov. 8	16:00	CCA	Galeries Tower Highrisers	1–3	PLDT High Speed Hitters	19–25	25–19	16–25	21–25		81–94	P2
Nov. 11	16:00	FIL	Petro Gazz Angels	1–3	Farm Fresh Foxies	21–25	22–25	25–21	26–28		94–99	P2
Nov. 11	18:30	FIL	Chery Tiggo EV Crossovers	3–2	Capital1 Solar Spikers	27–25	23–25	25–12	22–25	15–13	112–100	P2
Nov. 15	13:30	YC2	Farm Fresh Foxies	3–0	Galeries Tower Highrisers	25–23	25–13	25–11			75–47	P2
Nov. 15	16:00	YC2	PLDT High Speed Hitters	3–1	Chery Tiggo EV Crossovers	26–28	25–12	25–16	25–13		101–69	P2
Nov. 15	18:30	YC2	Capital1 Solar Spikers	1–3	Petro Gazz Angels	27–25	13–25	10–25	13–25		63–100	P2
Nov. 20	13:30	MOA	Galeries Tower Highrisers	1–3	Capital1 Solar Spikers	25–12	27–29	19–25	18–25		89–91	P2
Nov. 20	16:00	MOA	Chery Tiggo EV Crossovers	0–3	Farm Fresh Foxies	17–25	23–25	27–29			67–79	P2
Nov. 20	18:30	MOA	Petro Gazz Angels	3–1	PLDT High Speed Hitters	25–21	27–25	23–25	25–21		100–92	P2

== Overall preliminary round standings ==
Pos	Team	Pld	W	L	Pts	SW	SL	SR	SPW	SPL	SPR	Qualification
1	Farm Fresh Foxies	8	7	1	21	22	7	3.143	694	618	1.123	Quarterfinals
2	Zus Coffee Thunderbelles	8	7	1	20	21	8	2.625	688	596	1.154	Quarterfinals
3	PLDT High Speed Hitters	8	6	2	18	19	9	2.111	669	591	1.132	Quarterfinals
4	Creamline Cool Smashers	8	5	3	17	20	12	1.667	729	661	1.103	Quarterfinals
5	Petro Gazz Angels	8	5	3	14	17	14	1.214	718	669	1.073	Quarterfinals
6	Cignal Super Spikers	8	5	3	13	16	14	1.143	672	650	1.034	Quarterfinals
7	Capital1 Solar Spikers	8	4	4	13	16	14	1.143	660	688	0.959	Quarterfinals
8	Akari Chargers	8	4	4	12	18	16	1.125	749	731	1.025	Quarterfinals
9	Choco Mucho Flying Titans	8	3	5	9	11	17	0.647	621	660	0.941	
10	Chery Tiggo EV Crossovers	8	2	6	6	12	20	0.600	673	724	0.930	
11	Nxled Chameleons	8	0	8	1	5	24	0.208	576	701	0.822	
12	Galeries Tower Highrisers	8	0	8	0	2	24	0.083	465	635	0.732	

Source: Premier Volleyball League

== Final round ==
- All times are Philippine Standard Time (UTC+08:00).
- All matches are played at the Araneta Coliseum, Quezon City.

=== Bracket ===
Quarterfinals
November 24
Farm Fresh	0
Akari	3
November 24
Creamline	1
Petro Gazz	3
November 24
Zus Coffee	3
Capital1	0
November 24
PLDT	3
Cignal	1

Semifinals
November 27
Akari	2
Petro Gazz	3
November 27
Zus Coffee	3
PLDT	0

Championship
November 30
Petro Gazz	3
Zus Coffee	1
3rd-place match
November 30
Akari	3
PLDT	2

=== Quarterfinals ===
Date	Time		Score		Set 1	Set 2	Set 3	Set 4	Set 5	Total	Report
Nov. 24	11:00	Farm Fresh Foxies	0–3	Akari Chargers	26–28	28–30	21–25			75–83	P2
Nov. 24	13:30	Creamline Cool Smashers	1–3	Petro Gazz Angels	23–25	19–25	25–16	14–25		81–91	P2
Nov. 24	16:00	Zus Coffee Thunderbelles	3–0	Capital1 Solar Spikers	25–14	25–20	25–18			75–52	P2
Nov. 24	18:30	PLDT High Speed Hitters	3–1	Cignal Super Spikers	25–21	25–18	23–25	25–21		98–85	P2

=== Semifinals ===
Date	Time		Score		Set 1	Set 2	Set 3	Set 4	Set 5	Total	Report
Nov. 27	16:00	Akari Chargers	2–3	Petro Gazz Angels	19–25	17–25	25–15	25–22	13–15	99–102	P2
Nov. 27	18:30	Zus Coffee Thunderbelles	3–0	PLDT High Speed Hitters	25–22	28–26	25–22			78–70	P2

=== Finals ===
==== 3rd-place match ====
Date	Time		Score		Set 1	Set 2	Set 3	Set 4	Set 5	Total	Report
Nov. 30	14:00	PLDT High Speed Hitters	2–3	Akari Chargers	25–15	23–25	25–21	24–26	18–20	115–107	P2

==== Championship match ====
Date	Time		Score		Set 1	Set 2	Set 3	Set 4	Set 5	Total	Report
Nov. 30	17:00	Zus Coffee Thunderbelles	1–3	Petro Gazz Angels	25–21	26–28	23–25	20–25		94–99	P2

== Final standing ==
Rank	Team
1st place, gold medalist(s)	Petro Gazz Angels
2nd place, silver medalist(s)	Zus Coffee Thunderbelles
3rd place, bronze medalist(s)	Akari Chargers
4	PLDT High Speed Hitters
5	Farm Fresh Foxies
6	Creamline Cool Smashers
7	Cignal Super Spikers
8	Capital1 Solar Spikers
9	Choco Mucho Flying Titans
10	Chery Tiggo EV Crossovers
11	Nxled Chameleons
12	Galeries Tower Highrisers

2025 PVL Reinforced champions
Petro Gazz Angels
Fourth title

Team roster
Remy Palma (c), Antoinette Adolfo, Joy Dacoron, Djanel Cheng, Julyana Tolentino, Jellie Tempiatura, Aiza Maizo-Pontillas, Brooke Van Sickle, MJ Phillips, Myla Pablo, Ranya Musa, Chie Saet, Nicole Tiamzon, Jonah Sabete, Lindsay Vander Weide, Bang Pineda
Head coach
Gary Van Sickle

== Awards and medalists ==
Individual awards

Award	Player	Team	Ref.
Conference Most Valuable Player	Brooke Van Sickle	Petro Gazz	
Finals Most Valuable Player	MJ Phillips	Petro Gazz	
Rookie of the Conference	AC Miner	Zus Coffee	
Best Outside Spiker	Brooke Van Sickle	Petro Gazz	
Best Outside Spiker	Savi Davison	PLDT	
Best Middle Blocker	Maddie Madayag	Choco Mucho	
Best Middle Blocker	Jeanette Panaga	Creamline	
Best Opposite Spiker	Trisha Tubu	Farm Fresh	
Best Setter	Cloanne Mondoñedo	Zus Coffee	
Best Libero	Thang Ponce	Choco Mucho	
Best Foreign Guest Player	Anna DeBeer	Zus Coffee	

=== Medalists ===
Gold	Silver	Bronze
Petro Gazz Angels: Remy Palma (c); Antoinette Adolfo; Joy Dacoron; Djanel Cheng; Julyana Tolentino; Jellie Tempiatura (L); Aiza Maizo-Pontillas; Brooke Van Sickle; MJ Phillips; Myla Pablo; Ranya Musa; Chie Saet; Nicole Tiamzon; Jonah Sabete; Lindsay Vander Weide (I); Bang Pineda (L)	Zus Coffee Thunderbelles: Cloanne Mondoñedo (c); Mycah Go; Caroline Santos; Thea Gagate; Kate Santiago; Claudine Troncoso; Julia Angeles (L); Jade Gentapa; Jovelyn Gonzaga; Gayle Pascual; Chinnie Pia Arroyo; Wielyn Estoque; Renee Mabilangan; Shayra Ancheta; Dolly Versoza; AC Miner; Alyssa Eroa (L); Fiola Ceballos; Anna DeBeer (I); Rizza Nogales; Maika Ortiz	Akari Chargers: Justine Jazareno (L) (c); Dani Ravena; Fifi Sharma; Max Juangco (L); Stephanie Bustrillo; Grethcel Soltones; Chenie Tagaod; Kamille Cal; Ezra Madrigal; Theo Bea Bonafe; Camille Victoria; Erika Raagas; Joan Doguna; Celine Domingo; Jamaica Villena; Ivy Lacsina; Faith Nisperos; Marionne Alba; Annie Michem (I); Eli Soyud
Head coach: Gary Van Sickle	Head coach: Jerry Yee	Head coach: Tina Salak

== Statistics leaders ==
Statistics leaders correct at the end of the preliminary round.

Best Scorers
Rank	Name	Points
1	(Ukraine) Oleksandra Bytsenko	211
2	(United States) Anna DeBeer	210
3	(Belgium) Helene Rousseaux	209
4	(Cuba) Yunieska Batista	198
5	(United States) Annie Michem	195

Best Spikers
Rank	Name	%Suc
1	(Philippines) Trisha Gayle Tubu	39.53
2	(United States) Annie Michem	39.41
3	(United States) Anna DeBeer	39.40
4	(Belgium) Helene Rousseaux	38.71
5	(Ukraine) Oleksandra Bytsenko	37.84

Best Blockers
Rank	Name	Avg
1	(Philippines) Maddie Madayag	1.04
2	(Canada) Savi Davison	0.71
3	(Philippines) Jeanette Panaga	0.63
4	(Belgium) Helene Rousseaux	0.59
5	(Russia) Anastasiia Bavykina	0.57

Best Servers
Rank	Name	Avg
1	(Philippines) Eli Soyud	0.47
2	(Belgium) Helene Rousseaux	0.41
3	(United States) Lindsey Vander Weide	0.39
4	(Philippines) Angelica Cayuna	0.37
5	(Philippines) Jean Asis	0.35

Best Diggers
Rank	Name	Avg
1	(Philippines) Kathleen Faith Arado	4.93
2	(Philippines) Dawn Macandili-Catindig	4.90
3	(Philippines) Toni Rose Ponce	4.46
4	(Philippines) Justine Jazareno	4.24
5	(Philippines) Alyssa Eroa	4.00

Best Setters
Rank	Name	Avg
1	(Philippines) Cloanne Mondoñedo	6.24
2	(United States) Alohi Robins-Hardy	6.17
3	(Philippines) Angelica Cayuna	5.80
4	(Philippines) Kim Fajardo	5.29
5	(Philippines) Marionne Alba	5.00

Best Receivers
Rank	Name	%Eff
1	(Philippines) Toni Rose Ponce	55.42
2	(Philippines) Alyssa Bertolano	50.63
3	(United States) Anna DeBeer	45.68
4	(Philippines) Isa Molde	44.38
5	(Philippines) Juliet Catindig	43.04

== PVLPC Player of the Week ==
Week	Player	Team	Ref.
October 9–18	Annie Mitchem	Akari Chargers	
October 21–25	Erika Santos	Cignal Super Spikers	
October 28–31	Anna DeBeer	Zus Coffee Thunderbelles	
November 4–8	Cloanne Mondoñedo	Zus Coffee Thunderbelles	
November 10–16	Erika Santos	Cignal Super Spikers	
November 18–20	Brooke Van Sickle	Petro Gazz Angels	

== See also ==
- 2025 Spikers' Turf Invitational Conference
