= Alyssa Eroa =

Filipino volleyball player (born 1996)

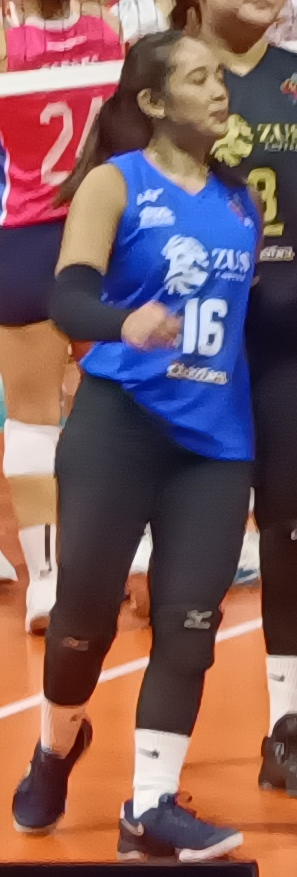
- Eroa in 2025

Personal information
- Nationality: Filipino
- Born: September 6, 1996 (age 30)
- Height: 1.50 m (4 ft 11 in)
- Education: San Sebastian College-Recoletos

Volleyball information
- Position: Libero
- Current club: Zus Coffee Thunderbelles
- Number: 16

Alyssa Eroa (born September 6, 1996) is a Filipino volleyball player and currently playing for the Zus Coffee Thunderbelles in the Premier Volleyball League.

== Career ==
=== Indoor ===
Eroa played for the Lady Stags of the San Sebastian College-Recoletos in the National Collegiate Athletic Association (NCAA).

She ended her stint with San Sebastian last playing for them in Season 93.

=== Beach ===
Eroa also played in the Beach Volleyball for the Lady Stags together with her beach volley partner, Grethcel Soltones from NCAA Season 90–92.

In the departure of Soltones in the NCAA, Dangie Encarnacion became her beach volley partner for her last playing year in Season 93.

== Clubs ==
- (Philippines) BaliPure Purest Water Defenders (2016–2017, 2021)
- (Philippines) PayMaya High Flyers (2018)
- (Philippines) Smart Giga Hitters (2018)
- (Philippines) PLDT Home Fibr Power Hitters (2018–2020)
- (Philippines) Marikina Lady Shoemasters (2023)
- (Philippines) Galeries Tower Highrisers (2024–2025)
- (Philippines) Zus Coffee Thunderbelles (2025–present)

== Awards ==
=== Individual ===
Year	League	Season/Conference	Award	Ref
2015	NCAA (indoor)	90	Best Receiver	
2016	NCAA (indoor)	91	Best Digger:	
2017	NCAA (indoor)	92	Best Libero	
2018	NCAA (indoor)	93	Best Libero	
2023	MPVA	Inaugural	Best Libero	
2024	PVL	Reinforced	Best Libero	

=== Collegiate ===
==== San Sebastian Lady Stags ====
Year	League	Season/Conference	Title	Ref
2015	NCAA (beach)	90	Champions	
2016	NCAA (beach)	91	Champions	
2017	NCAA (beach)	92	Champions	

=== Clubs ===
Year	League	Season/Conference	Club	Title	Ref
2018	PVL	Reinforced	PayMaya High Flyers	Runner-up	
2019	PSL	Grand Prix	PLDT Home Fibr Power Hitters	3rd place	
2023	MPVA	Inaugural	Marikina Lady Shoemasters	3rd place	
2025	PVL	Reinforced	Zus Coffee Thunderbelles	Runner-up	
