= Galeries Tower Highrisers =

Filipino women's volleyball team

- 2026–27 Galeries Tower Highrisers season
- Short name: Galeries
- Nickname: Highrisers
- Founded: 2023
- History: Galeries Tower Highrisers; 2023–present
- Owner: Grand Taipan Land Development Inc.
- Head coach: Clarence Esteban
- Captain: Roselle Baliton
- League: Premier Volleyball League
- 2026 All-Filipino: 8th place

Uniforms
Home	Away

The Galeries Tower Highrisers is a Philippine professional women's volleyball team owned by Grand Taipan Land Development. The team competes in the Premier Volleyball League (PVL), where they made their debut in the 2023 Second All-Filipino Conference.

== History ==
The Galeries Tower Highrisers joined the Premier Volleyball League in 2023. The team debut in the 2023 Second All-Filipino Conference. The team is owned by real estate developer Grand Taipan Land Development Inc. and was named after the Galeries Tower Manila residential condominium.

In the 2024–25 All-Filipino Conference, despite finishing 10th in the preliminary round, Galeries upset the third-seeded Cignal HD Spikers in their qualifying round match to advance to the quarterfinals for the first time. They would go on to be swept by the Akari Chargers in the best-of-three series.

== Current roster ==
Galeries Tower Highrisers roster
No.	Nat.	Player	Pos.	Height	DOB	From
3	(Philippines)	Ann Asis	Middle Blocker	1.70 m (5 ft 7 in)	March 7, 2002 (age 24)	Far Eastern
4	(Philippines)	Shola Alvarez	Outside Hitter	1.70 m (5 ft 7 in)	July 11, 1997 (age 29)	José Rizal
6	(Philippines)	Julia Angeles	Libero	1.63 m (5 ft 4 in)	September 1, 1998 (age 28)	Letran
7	(Philippines)	Blove Barbon	Libero	1.63 m (5 ft 4 in)	April 25, 1999 (age 27)	UST
8	(Philippines)	Aiza Maizo-Pontillas	Opposite Hitter	1.78 m (5 ft 10 in)	February 29, 1988 (age 38)	UST
9	(Philippines)	Camille Victoria	Opposite Hitter	1.82 m (6 ft 0 in)	December 26, 1999 (age 26)	UST
10	(Philippines)	Jean Asis	Middle Blocker	1.78 m (5 ft 10 in)	August 8, 2002 (age 24)	Far Eastern
11	(Philippines)	Erika Raagas	Outside Hitter	1.68 m (5 ft 6 in)	March 30, 2000 (age 26)	Ateneo
12	(Philippines)	Roselle Baliton	Middle Blocker	1.83 m (6 ft 0 in)	March 27, 1997 (age 29)	UE
13	(Philippines)	Camilla Lamina	Setter	1.66 m (5 ft 5 in)	March 23, 2002 (age 24)	National-U
15	(Philippines)	Alyssa Bertolano	Opposite Hitter	1.67 m (5 ft 6 in)	August 23, 2002 (age 24)	Philippines
16	(Philippines)	Dolly Versoza	Libero	1.65 m (5 ft 5 in)	March 10, 1998 (age 28)	José Rizal
17	(Philippines)	Erika Deloria	Outside Hitter	1.69 m (5 ft 7 in)	May 20, 2001 (age 25)	Enderun
22	(Philippines)	Gayle Pascual	Outside Hitter	1.72 m (5 ft 8 in)	September 3, 1999 (age 27)	St. Benilde
23	(Philippines)	Lycha Ebon	Opposite Hitter	1.70 m (5 ft 7 in)	October 23, 1999 (age 26)	Far Eastern
24	(Philippines)	Maji Mangulabnan	Setter	1.64 m (5 ft 5 in)	March 24, 1999 (age 27)	UST
25	(Philippines)	Jade Gentapa	Outside Hitter	1.72 m (5 ft 8 in)	November 28, 2000 (age 25)	St. Benilde
Updated as of: September 15, 2026 | Source: PVL.ph

Coaching staff

- Head coach:
  Clarence Esteban
- Assistant coaches:
  Rommel Abella
  Franz Damian
  John David Subere
  Lorence Cruz
  John Michael Millado
- Statistician:
  Enzo Miguel Vinarao
  John Emmanuel Dedoroy
- Strength and conditioning coach:
  Kim Robert Bejo

Team staff

- Team manager:
  Rontristan Notado
  Charles John Quimpo
- Team coordinator:
  John Lennard Cruz

Medical staff

- Physical therapist:
  Juan Miguel Duzon

== Season-by-season records ==
Season	Conference	Preliminary round	Final round	Ranking	Source
2023 (team)	Second All-Filipino	11th (1–10, 2 pts)	Did not qualify	11th place	
2024–25 (team)	All-Filipino	10th (3–8, 9 pts)	Did not qualify	10th place	
2024–25 (team)	Reinforced	11th (0–8, 4 pts)	Did not qualify	11th place	
2024–25 (team)	Invitational	Did not qualify			
2024–25 (team)	All-Filipino	10th (1–10, 5 pts) (Note: Galeries Tower won in the qualifying round vs. Cignal and advanced to the final round.)	Lost in quarterfinals vs. Akari, 0–2 (Note: Best-of-three series.)	8th place	
2025–26 (team)	PVL on Tour	6th (0–5, 0 pts)	Did not qualify	12th place	
2025–26 (team)	Invitational	Did not qualify			
2025–26 (team)	Reinforced	12th (0–8, 0 pts)	Did not qualify	12th place	
2025–26 (team)	All-Filipino	9th (2–7, 6 pts)	Lost in Play-in semifinal (Pool A) vs. Nxled, 0–3	8th place	
2026–27 (team)	Invitational	Did not qualify			

== Individual awards ==
PVLPC Comeback Player of the Year

- Alyssa Eroa – 2025

PVLPC Best Libero

- Alyssa Eroa – 2025

Best Libero

- Alyssa Eroa – 2024 Reinforced

== Team captains ==
- (Philippines) Fenela Risha Emnas (2023)
- (Philippines) Dimdim Pacres (2024)
- (Philippines) Alyssa Eroa (2024–2025)
- (Philippines) Roselle Baliton (2025)(2026–present)
- (Philippines) Julia Coronel (2026)

== Coaches ==
- (Philippines) Lerma Giron (2023–2025)
- (Kenya) Godfrey Okumu (2025)
- (Philippines) Clarence Esteban (2026–present)

== Imports ==
- (Brazil) Monique Helena (2024)
- (Thailand) Sutadta Chuewulim (2024)
- (Montenegro) Jelena Cvijović (2025)

== Former players ==
Local players

- Alyssa Eroa (2023-2025)
- AC Masangkay
- Andrea Marzan
- Audry Paran
- Carly Hernandez
- Dimdim Pacres
- Dodee Batindaan
- Fenela Risha Emnas (2023-2025)
- France Ronquillo
- Grazielle Bombita
- Jewel Encarnacion (2024-2025)
- Jhoanna Maraguinot
- Julia Ipac
- Jules Samonte
- Juliet Catindig
- Marian Tracy Andal
- Rapril Aguilar
- Renee Mabilangan
- Renesa Melgar
- Roma Joy Doromal
- Sharya Ancheta (2026)
- Winnie Bedana (2025-2026)
- Ysa Jimenez
- Julia Coronel (2024-2026)

Foreign players

- (Thailand) Sutadta Chuewulim
- (Montenegro) Jelena Cvijović

== Draft history ==
Season	Pick No.	Name
2024	3	Julia Coronel
2024	15	Jewel Encarnacion
2024	21	Dodee Batindaan
2024	23	Danivah Aying
2025	2	Jean Asis
2025	15	Winnie Bedaña
2026	1	Camilla Lamina
2026	10	Ann Asis
