= Dimdim Pacres =

Filipino volleyball player

Personal information
- Full name: Mary Dominique Pardillo Pacres
- Nationality: Filipino
- Born: September 23, 1997 (age 29)
- Hometown: Cebu, Philippines
- Height: 1.77 m (5 ft 10 in)
- Education: University of Santo Tomas

Volleyball information
- Position: Opposite hitter
- Current club: Galeries Tower Highrisers

Career
Years	Teams
2017	Power Smashers
2018	Marinerang Pilipina
2018	Tacloban Fighting Warays
2023–2026	Galeries Tower Highrisers

Mary Dominique "Dimdim" Pardillo Pacres is a Filipino professional volleyball player who last played for the Galeries Tower Highrisers of the Premier Volleyball League (PVL).

== Career ==
=== Collegiate ===
The UST Golden Tigresses had Pacres as a player at the UAAP volleyball championships. She largely played a support role to more established players for Season 79 and 80. Eya Laura's arrival in Season 81 initially relegated Pacres to the bench, but Milena Alessandrini's injury rendered back Pacres to Tigresses' first three.

=== Early club career ===
Pacres competed outside the PVL while still in college. She was the main player for the Power Smashers in 2017 of the Premier Volleyball League (PVL). Pacres last played for the Tacloban Fighting Warays of the PVL and the Marinerang Pilipina Lady Skippers of the Philippine Super Liga in 2018. She featured for Team Red in a PVL All Stars game against Team Blue in February 2019.

=== Hiatus (2018–23) ===
After her PVL stint in 2018, Pacres was forced to a hiatus. The PVL became fully professional in 2021. Pacres received multiple offers from teams to return to the league including Peak Form, which ultimately forego its participation in the 2021 PVL Open Conference.

=== Return ===
Pacres made her return to the PVL after she joined newly formed team Galeries Tower Highrisers in September 2023. The Galeries debuted at the 2023 Second All-Filipino Conference

== Personal life ==
Pacres hails from Cebu. During her hiatus between 2018 and 2023, she worked as a call center agent and maintained a food business.
