= Godfrey Okumu =

Kenyan volleyball coach

Personal information
- Full name: Godfrey Owese Okumu
- Nationality: Kenyan
- Born: August 11, 1968 (age 58)
- Hometown: Nyanza

Coaching information
Previous teams coached
Years	Teams
2009–2012; 2016–2018; 2017–2022; 2019; 2025–	Oita Miyoshi Weisse Adler; Hakata Girls High School; UP Lady Fighting Maroons; Motolite Power Builders; Galeries Tower Highrisers

National team
1990–2003	Kenya

Godfrey Owese Okumu (born August 11, 1968) is a Kenyan volleyball coach. He is also a former player who has played for the Kenyan national volleyball team. Okumu is a native of Nyanza.

== Playing career ==
As a player, Okumu played for various clubs as well as the Kenyan men's national volleyball team from 1990 to 2003. After his retirement, he moved to Japan. He worked as an English teacher in the Kumamoto Prefecture in 2002 before coaching.

== Coaching career ==
Godfrey Okumu is a holder of a FIVB Level 3 coaching certificate and is a member of the Japanese Society of Volleyball Research.

=== In Japan ===
After his playing career, Okumu moved to Japan sometime in the 2000s. Okumu served as part of the coaching staff of the Oita Miyoshi Weisse Adler men's professional volleyball club from 2009 to 2012. He also served as coach of the Hakata Girls High School volleyball team as well.

=== Kenyan women's national team ===
The Kenyan women's national team had Okumu as part of their coaching staff at the 2006 and 2010 FIVB Volleyball Women's World Championships, as well as in the 2011 and 2015 FIVB Volleyball Women's World Cups.

=== In the Philippines ===
Okumu served as head Coach of the UP Lady Fighting Maroons, the women's volleyball collegiate team of the University of the Philippines. In September 2017, Okumu was announced as the new head coach of the team. Okumu's first stint with the team was at UAAP Season 80 which took place 2018. Okumu has said that he will introduce the "Japanese style" of play to the collegiate team which he learned in his Japan stint. In July 2022, Okumu announced his departure from the team.

Okumu also coached in the Premier Volleyball League. He was head coach of the Motolite Power Builders in 2019. He returned to the PVL as an assistant coach for debutants Galeries Tower Highrisers.

In August 2025, Okumu was promoted as Galeries' head coach after the departure of Lerma Giron.

== Personal life ==
Okumu has a daughter named Hawi Okumu Oba, who plays professionally in Japan. As of 2017, Hawi plays for Hitachi Rivale and become part of the Japanese national team.
