= Erika Deloria =

Filipino volleyball player

Personal information
- Full name: Erika Jin Deloria
- Nationality: Filipino
- Born: May 20, 2001 (age 25)
- Hometown: Bacolod
- Height: 1.69 m (5 ft 7 in)
- Education: Enderun Colleges

Volleyball information
- Position: Outside Hitter
- Current club: Galeries Tower Highrisers

Career
Years	Teams
2024	Biñan Tatak Gel Volley Angels
2025	Chery Tiggo Crossovers
2026–present	Galeries Tower Highrisers

Erika Jin Deloria is a Filipino professional volleyball player who plays for the Galeries Tower Highrisers of the Premier Volleyball League (PVL).

== Early life and education ==
Erika Jin Deloria was born on May 20, 2001. She hails from Bacolod. She attended the Christian Academy of Bacolod and was signed in by her teacher to the school's elementary school volleyball team. She later played for the high school girls' teams of Trinity Christian School and Bacolod Tay Tung High School. For her tertiary studies she attended the Enderun Colleges.

== Career ==
=== College ===
Deloria was recruited by the Enderun Colleges. Under coach Ariel "Dong" Dela Cruz, she played for the Titans at the National Athletic Association of Schools, Colleges and Universities (NAASCU). She was named Most Valuable Player in Season 21 in 2024.

She also took part at the 2023 V-League Collegiate Challenge and the 2024 and 2025 Shakey's Super League National Invitationals.

=== Club ===
Deloria played for the Biñan Tatak Gel Volley Angels of the Maharlika Pilipinas Volleyball Association for the 2024 season. The team finished as runners-up, losing to the Quezon Tangerines in the finals.

Having no prior University Athletic Association of the Philippines (UAAP) appearance, Deloria was unexpectedly picked 20th overall by the Chery Tiggo Crossovers at the 2025 draft of the Premier Volleyball League (PVL).

When Chery Tiggo disbanded in 2025, Deloria was signed in by the Galeries Tower Highrisers from free agency in 2026.
