= Julia Coronel =

Filipino volleyball player

Personal information
- Full name: Julia Cyrille Coronel
- Nationality: Filipino
- Born: October 5, 2001 (age 25) Mandaluyong, Philippines
- Education: De La Salle University
- Height: 1.76 m (5 ft 9 in)
- Spike: 287 cm (113 in)
- Block: 303 cm (119 in)

Volleyball information
- Position: Setter / Opposite hitter

Career
- Years: Team
- 2024–2026: Galeries Tower Highrisers
- 2026–present: Capital1 Solar Spikers

National team
- Years: Team
- 2024–: Philippines
Honours
Women's volleyball
Representing Philippines
Asian Nations Cup
Silver medal – second place	2025 Hanoi	Team
Bronze medal – third place	2024 Manila	Team

Julia Cyrille Coronel is a Filipino professional volleyball player who plays for the Capital1 Solar Spikers of the Premier Volleyball League (PVL).

== Education ==
Julia Cyrille Coronel was born on October 5, 2001. She studied at the Colegio San Agustin Makati. She graduated from the De La Salle University in 2025 with a degree in information technology.

== Career ==
=== College ===
Coronel played for the De La Salle Lady Spikers in the University Athletic Association of the Philippines (UAAP). She was supposed to debut at UAAP Season 82 but it was cancelled due to the COVID-19 pandemic. In Seasons 84 and 85, she was played as a backup for Mars Alba. However, in her final year in Season 86, Coronel became the starting setter and team captain. However the NU Lady Bulldogs prevented a title defense by DLSU.

=== Club ===
Coronel joined the 2024 draft of the Premier Volleyball League (PVL). She was the third pick overall and was selected by Galeries Tower Highrisers and later debuted in the 2024 Reinforced Conference. She played the setter and opposite hitter positions. She also became the team's captain. Coronel left the Galeries Tower High Risers in September 2026. On September 17, 2026, Coronel was signed by the Capital1 Solar Spikers.

=== National team ===
Coronel received her first call up to the Philippine national team in 2024. She played at the 2024 AVC Women's Challenge Cup

== Personal life ==
Coronel has been in a relationship with her strength and conditioning coach, Gelo Vito since 2023. In 2025, Coronel took up the role of a television analyst for the UAAP.
