= List of 2026–27 Premier Volleyball League season transactions =

The following is a list of transactions that have taken place during the 2026–27 Premier Volleyball League season and the prior off-season.

== Retirement ==
Date	Name	Team(s)	Notes	Ref.
August 3, 2026	Jules Samonte	Perlas Spikers (2021–2022); PLDT High Speed Hitters (2022–2025); Chery Tiggo Crossovers (2025); Galeries Tower Highrisers (2025–2026)	Also played with the Ateneo Blue Eagles (UAAP) from 2015 to 2019.	
September 16, 2026	Aby Maraño	F2 Logistics Cargo Movers (2021–2023); Chery Tiggo Crossovers (2024–2025); Nxled Chameleons (2026)	Also played in the Philippine Super Liga from 2014 to 2020.	
September 18, 2026	Maika Ortiz	Chery Tiggo Crossovers (2021–2022); Choco Mucho Flying Titans (2022–2025); Zus Coffee Thunderbelles (2025–2026)	Also played in the Philippine Super Liga from 2014 to 2020.	

== Free agency ==
=== Transfers ===
Player	Date signed	New team	Former team	Ref.
Vanie Gandler	May 14, 2026	Capital1 Solar Spikers	Cignal Super Spikers	
Erika Santos	May 14, 2026	Capital1 Solar Spikers	Cignal Super Spikers	
Erin Pangilinan	May 19, 2026	Creamline Cool Smashers	Cignal Super Spikers	
Jewel Encarnacion	May 21, 2026	Choco Mucho Flying Titans	Cignal Super Spikers	
Gel Cayuna	May 23, 2026	Nxled Chameleons	Cignal Super Spikers	
Jackie Acuña	May 23, 2026	Nxled Chameleons	Cignal Super Spikers	
Tin Tiamzon	May 24, 2026	Akari Chargers	Cignal Super Spikers	
Dawn Macandili-Catindig	May 27, 2026	Choco Mucho Flying Titans	Cignal Super Spikers	
Ishie Lalongisip	June 1, 2026	Creamline Cool Smashers	Cignal Super Spikers	
Roselyn Doria	June 1, 2026	Farm Fresh Foxies	Cignal Super Spikers	
Buding Duremdes	June 1, 2026	Farm Fresh Foxies	Cignal Super Spikers	
Maria Jessa Ordiales	June 2, 2026	PLDT High Speed Hitters	Cignal Super Spikers	
Winnie Bedaña	June 10, 2026	PLDT High Speed Hitters	Galeries Tower Highrisers	
Ann Monares	June 16, 2026	Akari Chargers	Farm Fresh Foxies	
Sharya Ancheta	June 16, 2026	Akari Chargers	Galeries Tower Highrisers	
Ivy Perez	June 24, 2026	Choco Mucho Flying Titans	Cignal Super Spikers	
Iris Tolenada	June 28, 2026	Farm Fresh Foxies	Capital1 Solar Spikers	
Alyssa Bertolano	July 2, 2026	Galeries Tower Highrisers	Farm Fresh Foxies	
Jade Gentapa	July 3, 2026	Galeries Tower Highrisers	Zus Coffee Thunderbelles	
Zenneth Perolino	July 6, 2026	Farm Fresh Foxies	PLDT High Speed Hitters	
Renee Penafiel	July 6, 2026	Farm Fresh Foxies	Zus Coffee Thunderbelles	
Jolina Dela Cruz	July 7, 2026	Zus Coffee Thunderbelles	Farm Fresh Foxies	
Joyme Cagande	August 1, 2026	Akari Chargers	Nxled Chameleons	
Leila Cruz	August 12, 2026	PLDT High Speed Hitters	Capital1 Solar Spikers	
Ethan Arce	August 23, 2026	Farm Fresh Foxies	Cignal Super Spikers	
Kamille Cal	September 2, 2026	Farm Fresh Foxies	Akari Chargers	
Bea Bonafe	September 2, 2026	Farm Fresh Foxies	Akari Chargers	
Julia Coronel	September 17, 2026	Capital1 Solar Spikers	Galeries Tower Highrisers	
Mayang Nuique	September 30, 2026	Capital1 Solar Spikers	Nxled Chameleons	
Lorene Toring	October 6, 2026	Choco Mucho Flying Titans	Farm Fresh Foxies	

=== Returning players ===
Player	Date signed	New team	Former team	Former league	Last season	Ref.
Janel Maraguinot	May 14, 2026	Capital1 Solar Spikers	Nxled Chameleons	PVL	2025–26	
Donnalyn Paralejas	June 22, 2026	Creamline Cool Smashers	Petro Gazz Angels	PVL	2025–26	
Risa Sato	July 2, 2026	Akari Chargers	Chery Tiggo EV Crossovers	PVL	2025–26	
Jaja Santiago	August 7, 2026	Creamline Cool Smashers	Denso Airybees	SV.League	2021	

=== Going abroad ===
Player	Date signed	New team	New country	Former PVL team	Ref.
Thea Gagate	July 31, 2026	Denso Airybees (SV.League)	Japan	Zus Coffee Thunderbelles	

=== Unsigned ===
Player	Date of departure	Former team	Ref.
Pearl Denura	April 28, 2026	Cignal Super Spikers	
Heather Guino-o	April 28, 2026	Cignal Super Spikers	
Gyzelle Sy	April 28, 2026	Cignal Super Spikers	
Max Juangco	May 5, 2026	Akari Chargers	
Dani Ravena	May 5, 2026	Akari Chargers	
Jem Ferrer	May 22, 2026	Choco Mucho Flying Titans	
Anj Legacion	June 8, 2026	PLDT High Speed Hitters	
Joan Doguna	June 10, 2026	Akari Chargers	
Stephanie Bustrillo	June 10, 2026	Akari Chargers	
Tia Andaya	June 25, 2026	Choco Mucho Flying Titans	
Iris Tolenada	September 2, 2026	Farm Fresh Foxies	

== New recruits ==
Player	Date signed	New team	Former team	Former league	Ref.
Joan Monares	June 12, 2026	PLDT High Speed Hitters	UP Diliman	UAAP	
Chenae Basarte	July 7, 2026	Zus Coffee Thunderbelles	Benilde	NCAA	
Zam Nolasco	July 7, 2026	Zus Coffee Thunderbelles	Benilde	NCAA	
Xyza Gula	September 16, 2026	Akari Chargers	UST	UAAP	

=== Draft ===
Player	Date signed	New team	Former team	Former league	Ref.
Tin Ubaldo	July 6, 2026	Choco Mucho Flying Titans	FEU	UAAP	
Barbie Jamili	July 6, 2026	Creamline Cool Smashers	Adamson	UAAP	
Jonna Perdido	July 6, 2026	Farm Fresh Foxies	UST	UAAP	
Ela Raagas	July 6, 2026	Farm Fresh Foxies	DLSU	UAAP	
Camilla Lamina	July 6, 2026	Galeries Tower Highrisers	NU	UAAP	
Ann Asis	July 6, 2026	Galeries Tower Highrisers	FEU	UAAP	
Irah Jaboneta	July 7, 2026	Nxled Chameleons	UP Diliman	UAAP	
Fianne Ariola	July 7, 2026	PLDT High Speed Hitters	Perpetual	NCAA	
Alyanna Ong	July 7, 2026	Zus Coffee Thunderbelles	Mapúa	NCAA	
Detdet Pepito	July 7, 2026	Capital1 Solar Spikers	UST	UAAP	
Khy Cepada	July 7, 2026	Capital1 Solar Spikers	UE	UAAP	
