= List of Premier Volleyball League awards =

The Premier Volleyball League (PVL) presents multiple awards to recognize its players, coaches, and teams for their accomplishments. The league's conference awards were introduced with its establishment in 2017, while the season awards were introduced in 2025 and are given out by the PVL Press Corps.

== History ==
As the Premier Volleyball League was established as a rebrand of the Shakey's V-League in 2017, the league inherited a majority of the SVL's awards. These include Most Valuable Player, Finals Most Valuable Player, Best Foreign Guest Player, and a group of seven awards given to the best players in each position.

For most of the league's first decade, those were the only awards given out with some exceptions. For the 2018 Reinforced Conference, the league added an award for Highest Scorer in a Match, but this was not awarded beyond that point. The 2024 All-Filipino Conference introduced the league's first team award with the Fair Play Award, given to the most disciplined team in a conference. The first new regular award came in the form of the Rookie of the Conference, given to the best performing first-year player.

In 2025, the PVL Press Corps launched its own awards ceremony which brought with it a new line of season-based awards. Some of those are seasonal versions of their conference-based counterparts including the Most Valuable Player of the Season and Mythical Team. New awards include Coach of the Year, Executive of the Year, Comeback Player of the Year, Miss Quality Minutes, and Team of the Year. Another new award, Most Improved Player, was a remnant of the SVL's awards lineup. Additionally, the Fair Play Award became part of the Press Corps' awards.

== Season-based awards ==
Award	First awarded	Description	Most recent winner	Ref.
Most Valuable Player of the Season	2025	Awarded to the best performing player over the course of a PVL season.	Trisha Tubu (Farm Fresh Foxies)	
Rookie of the Year	2025	Awarded to the best performing first-year player over the course of a PVL season.	Bella Belen (Capital1 Solar Spikers)	
Coach of the Year	2025	Awarded to the best coach over the course of a PVL season.	Rald Ricafort (PLDT High Speed Hitters)	
Executive of the Year	2025	Awarded to the best team executive over the course of a PVL season.	Jonathan Ng (Creamline Cool Smashers)	
Best Outside Hitters	2025	Awarded to the two best performing outside hitters over the course of a PVL season; part of the Mythical Team.	Bella Belen (Capital1 Solar Spikers); Savi Davison (PLDT High Speed Hitters)	
Best Middle Blockers	2025	Awarded to the two best performing middle blockers over the course of a PVL season; part of the Mythical Team.	Majoy Baron (PLDT High Speed Hitters); Jeanette Panaga (Creamline Cool Smashers)	
Best Opposite Hitter	2025	Awarded to the best performing opposite hitter over the course of a PVL season; part of the Mythical Team.	Trisha Tubu (Farm Fresh Foxies)	
Best Setter	2025	Awarded to the best performing setter over the course of a PVL season; part of the Mythical Team.	Gel Cayuna (Cignal Super Spikers)	
Best Libero	2025	Awarded to the best performing libero over the course of a PVL season; part of the Mythical Team.	Kath Arado (PLDT High Speed Hitters)	
Most Improved Player	2025	Awarded to the player who has had the biggest improvement from the previous season.	Erika Santos (Cignal Super Spikers)	
Comeback Player of the Year	2025	Awarded to the player who has best shown resilience following a subpar season due to injury among other circumstances.	Kim Kianna Dy (PLDT High Speed Hitters)	
Miss Quality Minutes	2025	Awarded to the player who has had the biggest contributions to her team in crucial moments.	Alyssa Valdez (Creamline Cool Smashers)	
Team of the Year	2025	Awarded to the best team over the course of a PVL season. This is not to be confused with the Philippine Grand Champion, a title given to the league's season champion.	Creamline Cool Smashers	
Fair Play Award	2024	Awarded to the team with the most green cards over the course of a PVL season. This award was originally conference-based; most recently awarded in 2025.	Chery Tiggo Crossovers	

== Conference-based awards ==
Award	First awarded	Description	Most recent winner	Ref.
Most Valuable Player	2017	Awarded to the best performing player of a PVL conference.	Papatchaya Phontham (Est Cola)	
Finals Most Valuable Player	2017	Awarded to the best performing player of a PVL Finals. Most recently awarded in the 2026 All-Filipino Conference.	Bernadeth Pons (Creamline Cool Smashers)	
Rookie of the Conference	2024	Awarded to the best performing first-year player of a PVL conference; only awarded after the All-Filipino and Reinforced conferences.	Bella Belen (Capital1 Solar Spikers)	
Best Foreign Guest Player	2017	Awarded to the best performing foreign player of a PVL conference; only awarded after the Reinforced Conference.	Anna DeBeer (Zus Coffee Thunderbelles)	
Best Outside Hitters	2017	Awarded to the two best performing outside hitters of a PVL conference; part of the All-Premier Team.	Savi Davison (PLDT High Speed Hitters); Jonah Sabete (Nxled Chameleons)	
Best Middle Blockers	2017	Awarded to the two best performing middle blockers of a PVL conference; part of the All-Premier Team.	MJ Phillips (Nxled Chameleons); Jaja Santiago (Creamline Cool Smashers)	
Best Opposite Hitter	2017	Awarded to the best performing opposite hitter of a PVL conference; part of the All-Premier Team.	Papatchaya Phontham (Est Cola)	
Best Setter	2017	Awarded to the best performing setter of a PVL conference; part of the All-Premier Team.	Gel Cayuna (Nxled Chameleons)	
Best Libero	2017	Awarded to the best performing libero of a PVL conference; part of the All-Premier Team.	Kath Arado (PLDT High Speed Hitters)	
Highest Scorer in a Match	2018	Awarded to the player who scored the most points in a single match. This award has only been given out once in the 2018 Reinforced Conference.	Laika Bright (Perlas Spikers)	

== Most-awarded players ==
Only players with at least five Season MVP, Mythical Team, Conference MVP, Finals MVP, and All-Premier Team awards/selections are included in this list.

Name	Position	Years playing in PVL		Season awards		Conference awards			Total
Name	Position	From	To	SMVP	MT	MVP	FMVP	AP	Total
Alyssa Valdez	OH	2017	present	—	—	3	1	9	13
Jia de Guzman	S	2017	present	—	—	—	4	8	12
Jeanette Panaga	MB	2017	present	—	1	—	—	10	11
Tots Carlos	OP	2017	present	—	—	3	1	5	9
Kath Arado	L	2021	present	—	—	—	1	7	8
Gel Cayuna	S	2017	present	—	2	—	—	6	8
Jema Galanza	OH	2017	present	—	—	1	1	6	8
Myla Pablo	OH	2017	present	—	—	2	1	5	8
Trisha Tubu	OP	2024	present	1	2	—	—	5	8
Brooke Van Sickle	OH	2024	present	1	1	3	—	3	8
Savi Davison	OH	2023	present	—	1	1	—	3	5
Kyle Negrito	S	2018	present	—	—	—	1	4	5
MJ Phillips	MB	2021	present	—	—	—	2	3	5
Thang Ponce	L	2022	present	—	—	—	—	5	5
Bernadeth Pons	OH	2023	present	—	1	1	2	1	5
Jaja Santiago	MB	2017–2021; 2026	present	—	—	2	1	2	5
Grethcel Soltones	OH	2017	present	—	—	—	1	4	5

== See also ==
- List of Shakey's V-League award recipients
- List of Spikers' Turf award recipients
