= 2025–26 Cignal Super Spikers (women) season =

13th season of the Cignal Super Spikers women's team; fifth in the PVL

The 2025–26 Cignal Super Spikers season was the 13th season of the Cignal Super Spikers women's team, fifth in the Premier Volleyball League (PVL), and fifth in professional volleyball. It is also the final season of the franchise to date, as the team took a leave of absence after this season.

Roster changes were made ahead of the preseason PVL on Tour with Heather Guino-o and Tin Tiamzon joining the team while Frances Molina and Ria Meneses made their departures. Cignal topped Pool B with a 4–1 record and 12 points, giving them a direct berth into the final round. They would sweep Akari in the quarterfinals, but lose to the Chery Tiggo Crossovers in the semifinals. In the third-place match, they were swept by the Creamline Cool Smashers.

By reaching the semifinals of the PVL on Tour, Cignal qualified for the Invitational Conference. The team didn't perform well in the Invitational, finishing in 5th place with a 1–4 record and accruing four points, not making it through to the final round.

For the Reinforced Conference, the renamed Super Spikers signed Greek Eva Chantava as their foreign guest player, but was replaced by Slovakian player Katrin Trebichavská after two matches.

== Roster ==
2026 Cignal Super Spikers women's roster
No.	Nat.	Player	Pos.	Height	DOB	From
1	(Philippines)	Pearl An Denura	Libero	1.42 m (4 ft 8 in)	October 24, 2000 (age 25)	National-U
2	(Philippines)	Roselyn Doria	Middle Blocker	1.78 m (5 ft 10 in)	September 2, 1996 (age 29)	National-U
3	(Philippines)	Jewel Encarnacion	Outside Hitter	1.68 m (5 ft 6 in)	December 22, 2000 (age 25)	Philippines
4	(Philippines)	Tin Tiamzon	Outside Hitter	1.76 m (5 ft 9 in)	May 4, 1997 (age 29)	De La Salle
5	(Philippines)	Vanessa Gandler	Outside Hitter	1.75 m (5 ft 9 in)	December 5, 2000 (age 25)	Ateneo
6	(Philippines)	Ishie Lalongisip	Outside Hitter	1.68 m (5 ft 6 in)	December 30, 2001 (age 24)	Adamson
7	(Philippines)	Maria Jessa Ordiales	Middle Blocker	1.78 m (5 ft 10 in)	December 14, 2000 (age 25)	De La Salle
8	(Philippines)	Erika Mae Santos	Opposite Hitter	1.76 m (5 ft 9 in)	May 13, 1998 (age 28)	De La Salle
10	(Philippines)	Erin May Pangilinan	Middle Blocker	1.70 m (5 ft 7 in)	October 12, 2001 (age 24)	National-U
11	(Philippines)	Jacqueline Acuña	Middle Blocker	1.82 m (6 ft 0 in)	July 28, 2000 (age 25)	National-U
12	(Philippines)	Gyzelle Sy	Setter	1.65 m (5 ft 5 in)	August 2, 1992 (age 33)	Far Eastern
14	(Philippines)	Ethan Arce	Middle Blocker	1.76 m (5 ft 9 in)	June 6, 2001 (age 25)	Philippines
15	(Philippines)	Heather Guino-o	Outside Hitter	1.70 m (5 ft 7 in)	November 27, 1997 (age 28)	Far Eastern
16	(Philippines)	Dawn Macandili-Catindig (C)	Libero	1.53 m (5 ft 0 in)	June 1, 1996 (age 30)	De La Salle
17	(Philippines)	Ivy Jisel Perez	Setter	1.74 m (5 ft 9 in)	February 13, 1995 (age 31)	National-U
22	(Philippines)	Gel Cayuna	Setter	1.68 m (5 ft 6 in)	August 17, 1998 (age 27)	Far Eastern
24	(Philippines)	Ria Janelle Beatriz Duremdes	Libero	1.57 m (5 ft 2 in)	June 7, 1998 (age 28)	Far Eastern

Coaching staff

- Head coach:
  (Philippines) Shaq Delos Santos
- Assistant coach(s):
  (Philippines) Rico de Guzman
  (Philippines) Kirk Beliran
  (Philippines) Mark Detablan
  (Philippines) Justin Santos
  (Philippines) JC Salvador
- Trainer(s):
  (Philippines) Edwin Ajon
- Strength & conditioning coach:
  (Philippines) Dox Delos Reyes

Team staff

- Team Manager:
  (Philippines) Yani Fernandez

Medical staff

- Team Physician:
  (Philippines) Jeffrey Lansangan
- Physical Therapist:
  (Philippines) Mike Cabungan
- Physical Trainer:
  (Philippines) Gabriel Atienza

=== National team players ===
Players who are part of the Philippines women's national team are excluded from playing with the team due to various commitments. This affected the team's roster for both the PVL on Tour and Invitational Conference.

- Dawn Macandili-Catindig
- Vanie Gandler

== Draft ==
Round	Pick	Player	Pos.	School
1	6	Erin Pangilinan	MB/OP	NU
2	18	Jessa Ordiales	MB	De La Salle

== PVL on Tour ==
=== Preliminary round ===
==== Pool B standings ====
Pos	Team	Pld	W	L	Pts	SW	SL	SR	SPW	SPL	SPR	Qualification
1	Cignal HD Spikers	5	4	1	12	13	4	3.250	395	366	1.079	Final round
2	Creamline Cool Smashers	5	3	2	10	11	8	1.375	441	394	1.119	Final round
3	Chery Tiggo Crossovers	5	3	2	9	12	10	1.200	488	451	1.082	Knockout round
4	Zus Coffee Thunderbelles	5	3	2	7	12	12	1.000	512	503	1.018	Knockout round
5	Akari Chargers	5	2	3	6	9	11	0.818	420	460	0.913	Knockout round

Source: PVL.ph

==== Match log ====
2025 PVL on Tour preliminary round match log
Total: 4–1 (12 points)
June: 2–0 (6 points)

Match	Date	Opponent	Sets	Total	Location Attendance	Record	Pts	Report
1	June 22, 2025	Akari	3–0	75–60	Chavit Coliseum; 5,264	1–0	3	P2
2	June 23, 2025	Capital1	3–0	75–59	Chavit Coliseum; 5,004	2–0	6	P2

July: 2–1 (6 points)

Match	Date	Opponent	Sets	Total	Location Attendance	Record	Pts	Report
3	July 1, 2025	Creamline	3–0	78–66	Filoil Centre; 1,951	3–0	9	P2
4	July 19, 2025	Chery Tiggo	1–3	71–101	City of Passi Arena; 2,374	3–1	9	P2
5	July 20, 2025	Zus Coffee	3–1	96–80	City of Passi Arena; 2,405	4–1	12	P2

=== Final round ===
==== Bracket ====
Quarterfinals
August 7
1 PLDT	3
8 Zus Coffee	0
August 9
4 Creamline	3
5 Farm Fresh	0
August 7
2 Cignal	3
7 Akari	0
August 9
3 Nxled	0
6 Chery Tiggo	3

Semifinals
August 12
PLDT	3
Creamline	2
August 12
Cignal	1
Chery Tiggo	3

Championship
August 17
PLDT	3
Chery Tiggo	2
3rd place match
August 17
Creamline	3
Cignal	0

==== Match log ====
2025 PVL on Tour final round match log
Total: 1–2 (3 points)
Quarterfinals: 1–0 (3 points)

Date	Opponent	Sets	Total	Location Attendance	Report
August 7, 2025	Akari	3–0	78–57	PhilSports Arena; 564	P2

Semifinals: 0–1 (0 points)

Date	Opponent	Sets	Total	Location Attendance	Report
August 12, 2025	Chery Tiggo	1–3	86–91	Smart Araneta Coliseum; 2,551	P2

Third-place match: 0–1 (0 points)

Date	Opponent	Sets	Total	Location Attendance	Report
August 17, 2025	Creamline	0–3	61–79	SM Mall of Asia Arena; 7,882	P2

== Invitational Conference ==
=== Preliminary round ===
==== Standings ====
Pos	Team	Pld	W	L	Pts	SW	SL	SR	SPW	SPL	SPR	Qualification
2	Kobe Shinwa University	5	4	1	11	12	7	1.714	442	402	1.100	Championship match
3	Chery Tiggo Crossovers	5	3	2	9	11	9	1.222	430	425	1.012	3rd place match
4	Creamline Cool Smashers	5	2	3	7	11	11	1.000	482	460	1.048	3rd place match
5	Cignal HD Spikers	5	1	4	4	7	13	0.538	398	433	0.919	
6	Zus Coffee Thunderbelles	5	0	5	0	2	15	0.133	303	423	0.716	

Source: Premier Volleyball League

==== Match log ====
2025 PVL Invitational Conference preliminary round match log
Total: 1–4 (4 points)
August: 1–4 (4 points)

Match	Date	Opponent	Sets	Total	Location Attendance	Record	Pts	Report
– (Note: The result of Cignal's game against Chery Tiggo in the PVL on Tour semifinals was carried over to the Invitational Conference preliminary round. It is shown for the purpose of completeness.)	August 12, 2025	Chery Tiggo	1–3	86–91	Smart Araneta Coliseum; 2,551	0–1	0	P2
1	August 21, 2025	Creamline	2–3	86–109	PhilSports Arena; 2,182	0–2	1	P2
2	August 23, 2025	PLDT	0–3	54–75	PhilSports Arena; 2,046	0–3	1	P2
3	August 25, 2025	Zus Coffee	3–1	97–81	PhilSports Arena; 485	1–3	4	P2
4	August 28, 2025	Kobe Shinwa	1–3	75–96	Smart Araneta Coliseum; 395	1–4	4	P2

== Reinforced Conference ==
=== Preliminary round ===
==== Standings ====
Pos	Team	Pld	W	L	Pts	SW	SL	SR	SPW	SPL	SPR	Qualification
4	Creamline Cool Smashers	8	5	3	17	20	12	1.667	729	661	1.103	Quarterfinals
5	Petro Gazz Angels	8	5	3	14	17	14	1.214	718	669	1.073	Quarterfinals
6	Cignal Super Spikers	8	5	3	13	16	14	1.143	672	650	1.034	Quarterfinals
7	Capital1 Solar Spikers	8	4	4	13	16	14	1.143	660	688	0.959	Quarterfinals
8	Akari Chargers	8	4	4	12	18	16	1.125	749	731	1.025	Quarterfinals

Source: Premier Volleyball League

==== Match log ====
2025 PVL Reinforced Conference preliminary round match log
Total: 5–3 (13 points)
First round: 2–3 (5 points)

Match	Date	Opponent	Sets	Total	Location Attendance	Record	Pts	Report
1	October 13, 2025	Choco Mucho	1–3	85–100	Smart Araneta Coliseum; 1,800	0–1	0	P2
2	October 16, 2025	Farm Fresh	0–3	55–75	Smart Araneta Coliseum; 721	0–2	0	P2
3	October 21, 2025	PLDT	3–0	75–60	Smart Araneta Coliseum; 1,260	1–2	3	P2
4	October 25, 2025	Nxled	3–2	109–100	Ynares Center Montalban; 792	2–2	5	P2
5	October 31, 2025	Capital1	0–3	67–75	Filoil Centre; 820	2–3	5	P2

Second round: 3–0 (7 points)

Match	Date	Opponent	Sets	Total	Location Attendance	Record	Pts	Report
6	November 6, 2025	Akari	3–1	98–86	Filoil Centre; 518	3–3	8	P2
7	November 13, 2025	Zus Coffee	3–0	76–59	Smart Araneta Coliseum; 1,551	4–3	11	P2
8	November 18, 2025	Creamline	3–2	107–95	Ynares Center Montalban 2,555	5–3	13	P2

=== Final round ===
==== Bracket ====
Quarterfinals
November 24
Farm Fresh	0
Akari	3
November 24
Creamline	1
Petro Gazz	3
November 24
Zus Coffee	3
Capital1	0
November 24
PLDT	3
Cignal	1

Semifinals
November 27
Akari	2
Petro Gazz	3
November 27
Zus Coffee	3
PLDT	0

Championship
November 30
Petro Gazz	3
Zus Coffee	1
3rd-place match
November 30
Akari	3
PLDT	2

==== Match log ====
2025 PVL Reinforced Conference final round match log
Total: 0–1 (0 points)
Quarterfinals: 0–1 (0 points)

Date	Opponent	Sets	Total	Location Attendance	Report
November 24, 2025	PLDT	1–3	85–98	Smart Araneta Coliseum	P2

== All-Filipino Conference ==
=== Preliminary round ===
==== Standings ====
Pos	Team	Pld	W	L	Pts	SW	SL	SR	SPW	SPL	SPR	Qualification
1	PLDT High Speed Hitters	9	7	2	20	22	11	2.000	769	698	1.102	Qualifying round
2	Cignal Super Spikers	9	6	3	20	22	11	2.000	772	687	1.124	Qualifying round
3	Creamline Cool Smashers	9	6	3	16	20	16	1.250	700	662	1.057	Qualifying round
4	Farm Fresh Foxies	9	5	4	17	22	16	1.375	850	771	1.102	Qualifying round
5	Nxled Chameleons	9	5	4	15	20	16	1.250	810	773	1.048	Play-in tournament semifinals

Source: Premier Volleyball League

==== Match log ====
2026 PVL All-Filipino Conference preliminary round match log
Total: 6–3 (20 points)
January: 1–0 (3 points)

Match	Date	Opponent	Sets	Total	Location Attendance	Record	Pts	Report
1	January 31, 2026	Galeries	3–0	75–42	Filoil Centre; 1,934	1–0	3	P2

February: 3–2 (10 points)

Match	Date	Opponent	Sets	Total	Location Attendance	Record	Pts	Report
2	February 5, 2026	Choco Mucho	3–1	91–82	Filoil Centre; 2,717	1–0	6	P2
3	February 10, 2026	Farm Fresh	3–1	101–94	SM Mall of Asia Arena; 6,167	2–0	9	P2
4	February 14, 2026	Nxled	0–3	66–77	Ynares Center Antipolo; 939	2–1	9	P2
5	February 24, 2026	PLDT	3–0	75–63	Filoil Centre; 1,025	3–1	12	P2
6	February 28, 2026	Akari	2–3	108–96	Filoil Centre; 696	3–2	13	P2

March: 2–1 (7 points)

Match	Date	Opponent	Sets	Total	Location Attendance	Record	Pts	Report
7	March 5, 2026	Zus Coffee	3–0	75–63	Filoil Centre; 314	1–0	16	P2
8	March 14, 2026	Capital1	3–0	75–63	Filoil Centre; 2,694	2–0	19	P2
9	March 21, 2026	Creamline	2–3	106–107	Filoil Centre; 3,331	2–1	20	P2

=== Qualifying round ===
==== Match log ====
2026 PVL All-Filipino Conference qualifying round match log
Total: 1–0 (2 points)
Qualifying round: 1–0 (2 points)

Date	Opponent	Sets	Total	Location Attendance	Report
March 26, 2026	Creamline	3–2	109–109	Smart Araneta Coliseum; 4,574	P2

=== Semifinal round ===
==== Standings ====
Pos	Team	Pld	W	L	Pts	SW	SL	SR	SPW	SPL	SPR	Qualification
1	Cignal Super Spikers	3	2	1	6	6	5	1.200	248	207	1.198	Finals
2	Creamline Cool Smashers	3	2	1	5	7	6	1.167	270	289	0.934	Finals
3	PLDT High Speed Hitters	3	1	2	4	6	6	1.000	276	266	1.038	Third place series
4	Farm Fresh Foxies	3	1	2	3	5	7	0.714	245	278	0.881	Third place series

Source: Premier Volleyball League

==== Match log ====
2026 PVL All-Filipino Conference semifinal round match log
Total: 2–1 (6 points)
Semifinals: 2–1 (6 points)

Match	Date	Opponent	Sets	Total	Location Attendance	Record	Pts	Report
1	April 11, 2026	Farm Fresh	3–1	98–62	SM Mall of Asia Arena; 7,041	1–0	3	P2
2	April 14, 2026	Creamline	3–1	88–70	SM Mall of Asia Arena; 7,424	2–0	6	P2
3	April 16, 2026	PLDT	0–3	62–75	Filoil Centre; 3,761	2–1	6	P2

=== Finals ===
==== Match log ====
2026 PVL All-Filipino Conference final round match log
Total: 0–2 (1 points)
Finals: 0–2 (1 points)

Match	Date	Opponent	Sets	Total	Location Attendance	Record	Pts	Report
1	April 21, 2026	Creamline	0–3	56–75	Smart Araneta Coliseum; 8,183	0–1	0	P2
2	April 23, 2026	Creamline	2–3	100–103	Smart Araneta Coliseum; 17,358	0–2	1	P2

== Transactions ==
=== Additions ===
Player	Date signed	Previous team	Ref.
Ethan Arce	May 6, 2025	Petro Gazz Angels	
Heather Guino-o	May 6, 2025	Capital1 Solar Spikers	
Tin Tiamzon	May 6, 2025	F2 Logistics Cargo Movers	
Erika Santos	May 16, 2025	PLDT High Speed Hitters	
Pearl Denura	June 18, 2025	NU Lady Bulldogs (UAAP)	
Jewel Encarnacion	October 9, 2025	Galeries Tower Highrisers	
Ivy Perez	January 9, 2026	Galeries Tower Highrisers	

=== Subtractions ===
Player	New team	Ref.
Judith Abil	Akari Chargers	
Jerrili Malabanan	Capital1 Solar Spikers	
Ria Meneses	Farm Fresh Foxies	
Frances Molina	Farm Fresh Foxies	
