= List of Cignal HD Spikers (women) seasons =

The Cignal Super Spikers women's team was established in 2013 as the Cignal HD Spikers and were one of the founding members of the Philippine Super Liga. In 2021, the team turned pro and moved to the Premier Volleyball League.

== Records per conference ==
=== Philippine Super Liga (2013–2020) ===
Season	Conference	Preliminary round	Playoffs	Ranking	Source
2013	Invitational	2nd (3–2, 9 pts)	Won in semifinals vs. Petron, 3–0; Lost in finals vs. TMS–Philippine Army, 1–3	Runner-up	
2013	Grand Prix	4th (2–3, 6 pts)	Won in quarterfinals vs. Petron, 3–1; Won in semifinals vs. PLDT, 3–2; Lost in finals vs. TMS–Philippine Army, 1–3	Runner-up	
2014	All-Filipino	7th (1–5, 4 pts)	Did not qualify	7th place	
2014	Grand Prix	4th (4–6, 12 pts)	Lost in semifinals vs. Petron, 0–3; Lost in third place match vs. RC Cola–Air Force, 1–3	4th place	
2015	All-Filipino	5th (2–8, 7 pts)	Lost in quarterfinals vs. Philips Gold, 2–3; Won in fifth place match vs. Mane 'n Tail, 3–1	5th place	
2015	Grand Prix	3rd (7–3, 20 pts)	Lost in semifinals vs. Petron, 1–3; Lost in third place match vs. Philips Gold, 1–3	4th place	
2016	Invitational	4th (3–2, 9 pts)	Did not qualify	5th place	
2016	All-Filipino	5th (2–5, 7 pts) (First round); 2nd (2–1, 6 pts) (Second round)	Did not qualify Won in 5th–8th classification semifinals vs. Amy's Kitchen–Perpetual, 3–1; Lost in fifth place match vs. Generika, 2–3	6th place	
2016	Grand Prix	6th (1–9, 3 pts)	Lost in quarterfinals vs. F2 Logistics, 1–3; Lost in fifth place match vs. Generika, 0–3	6th place	
2017	Invitational	2nd (4–1, 12 pts)	Finished 2nd in final round	Co-champions	
2017	All-Filipino	2nd (5–1, 14 pts) (Pool C)	Won in quarterfinals vs. Cocolife; Lost in semifinals vs. F2 Logistics, 0–3; Won in third place match vs. Foton, 3–1	3rd place	
2017	Grand Prix	4th (4–4, 13 pts)	Lost in quarterfinals vs. Cocolife, 0–3	5th place	
2018	Grand Prix	6th (3–7, 9 pts)	Lost in quarterfinals vs. Cocolife, 0–3	6th place	
2018	Invitational	1st (4–0, 11 pts) (Group B)	Lost in semifinals vs. F2 Logistics, 0–3; Won in third place match vs. Smart–Army, 3–1	3rd place	
2018	All-Filipino	5th (5–5, 13 pts)	Won in quarterfinals vs. Foton, 3–1; Lost in semifinals vs. Petron, 0–3 (Note: Opposing team had twice-to-beat advantage.); Lost in third place match vs. Generika–Ayala, 0–3	4th place	
2019	Grand Prix	4th (7–7, 20 pts)	Won in quarterfinals vs. United VC, 3–1 (Note: Team had twice-to-beat advantage.); Lost in semifinals vs. Petron, 0–2 (Note: Best-of-three series.); Lost in third place match vs. PLDT, 2–3	4th place	
2019	All-Filipino	5th (7–7, 24 pts)	Won in quarterfinals vs. Generika–Ayala, 3–1; Won in semifinals vs. Petron in two games Lost in finals vs. F2 Logistics, 0–2	Runner-up	
2019	Invitational	2nd (2–1, 6 pts) (Pool C)	Lost in semifinals vs. F2 Logistics, 1–3; Won in third place match vs. Foton, 3–0	3rd place	
2020	Grand Prix	Conference cancelled			

=== Premier Volleyball League (2021–present) ===
Season	Conference	Preliminary round	Final round	Ranking	Source
2021 (team)	Open	10th (1–8, 3 pts)	Did not qualify	10th place	
2022 (team)	Open	1st (4–0, 12 pts) (Pool A)	Won in quarterfinals vs. BaliPure, 3–0; Lost in semifinals vs. Petro Gazz, 1–2; Won in third place series vs. Choco Mucho, 1–1 (Note: Cignal won on aggregate points ratio, 1.022–0.978 (185–181).)	3rd place	
2022 (team)	Invitational	3rd (4–2, 11 pts)	Finished 4th in semifinals Won in third place match vs. PLDT, 3–2	3rd place	
2022 (team)	Reinforced	4th (5–3, 14 pts)	Finished 1st in semifinals Lost in finals vs. Petro Gazz, 0–2	Runner-up	
2023 (team)	First All-Filipino	6th (3–5, 8 pts)	Did not qualify	6th place	
2023 (team)	Invitational	1st (4–1, 12 pts) (Pool B)	Finished 3rd in semifinals Won in third place match vs. F2 Logistics, 3–1	3rd place	
2023 (team)	Second All-Filipino	3rd (8–3, 25 pts)	Lost in semifinals vs. Choco Mucho, 1–2; Won in third place series vs. Chery Tiggo, 2–0	3rd place	
2024–25 (team)	2024 All-Filipino	6th (7–4, 22 pts)	Did not qualify	6th place	
2024–25 (team)	Reinforced	2nd (7–1, 20 pts)	Won in quarterfinals vs. Capital1, 3–2; Lost in semifinals vs. Creamline, 2–3; Won in third place match vs. PLDT, 3–1	3rd place	
2024–25 (team)	Invitational	2nd (3–1, 8 pts)	Lost in finals vs. Creamline, 2–3	Runner-up	
2024–25 (team)	2024–25 All-Filipino	3rd (8–3, 25 pts)	Did not qualify (Note: Cignal lost in the qualifying round vs. Capital1 and placed 3rd in the play-in tournament.)	9th place	
2025–26 (team)	PVL on Tour	1st (4–1, 12 pts) (Pool B)	Won in quarterfinals vs. Akari, 3–0; Lost in semifinals vs. Chery Tiggo, 1–3; Lost in third place match vs. Creamline, 0–3	4th place	
2025–26 (team)	Invitational	5th (1–4, 4 pts)	Did not qualify	5th place	
2025–26 (team)	Reinforced	6th (5–3, 13 pts)	Lost in quarterfinals vs. PLDT, 1–3	7th place	
2025–26 (team)	All-Filipino	2nd (6–3, 20 pts)	Won in qualifying vs. Creamline, 3–2; Finished 1st in semifinals (2–1, 6 pts); Lost in finals vs. Creamline, 0–2	Runner-up	
