= 2024–25 Cignal HD Spikers (women) season =

Filipino women's volleyball team season

The 2024–25 Cignal HD Spikers season was the 12th season of the Cignal Super Spikers women's team and fourth in the Premier Volleyball League (PVL).

The HD Spikers started the All-Filipino Conference strong with a four-match winning streak. They then fell into a slump, only going 1–3 in their next four matches before proceeding to finish the preliminary round with three consecutive wins. The team finished third with an 8–3 record and 25 points. In the qualifying round, the team suffered an upset against the 10th-seeded Galeries Tower Highrisers, thus putting Cignal in the play-in tournament. Drawn into Pool A, Cignal first beat the Capital1 Solar Spikers but lost to Zus Coffee in a close five-set match. After the Thunderbelles' four-set win over Capital1, Cignal was eliminated from final round contention.

== Roster ==
| No. | Name | Position | Height | Date of birth | School |
|---|---|---|---|---|---|
| 2 | (Philippines) Roselyn Doria | Middle blocker | 1.78 m (5 ft 10 in) | September 2, 1996 (age 29) | NU |
| 4 | (Philippines) Jovelyn Fernandez | Opposite Hitter | 1.68 m (5 ft 6 in) | January 4, 2001 (age 25) | FEU |
| 5 | (Philippines) Vanessa Gandler | Outside Hitter | 1.75 m (5 ft 9 in) | December 5, 2000 (age 25) | ADMU |
| 6 | (Philippines) Ishie Lalongisip | Outside Hitter | 1.68 m (5 ft 6 in) | December 30, 2001 (age 24) | AdU |
| 9 | (Philippines) Judith Abil | Opposite Hitter | 1.70 m (5 ft 7 in) | December 4, 1997 (age 28) | UE |
| 11 | (Philippines) Jacqueline Acuña | Middle blocker | 1.82 m (6 ft 0 in) | July 28, 2000 (age 25) | NU |
| 12 | (Philippines) Gyzelle Sy | Setter | 1.65 m (5 ft 5 in) | August 2, 1992 (age 33) | FEU |
| 16 | (Philippines) Dawn Macandili-Catindig (C) | Libero | 1.53 m (5 ft 0 in) | June 1, 1996 (age 30) | DLSU |
| 17 | (Philippines) Caroline Santos | Middle blocker | 1.76 m (5 ft 9 in) | | DLSU |
| 22 | (Philippines) Gel Cayuna | Setter | 1.68 m (5 ft 6 in) | August 17, 1998 (age 27) | FEU |
| 24 | (Philippines) Ria Janelle Beatriz Duremdes | Libero | 1.57 m (5 ft 2 in) | June 7, 1998 (age 28) | FEU |

Coaching staff

- Head coach:
  (Philippines) Shaq Delos Santos
- Assistant coach(s):
  (Philippines) Rico de Guzman
  (Philippines) Kirk Beliran
  (Philippines) Mark Detablan
  (Philippines) Justin Santos
  (Philippines) JC Salvador
  (Philippines) Yani Fernandez
- Trainer(s):
  (Philippines) Edwin Ajon
- Strength & conditioning coach:
  (Philippines) Dox Delos Reyes

Team Staff

- Team Manager:
  (Philippines) Ken Silverio Ucang

Medical Staff

- Team Physician:
- Physical Therapist:
  (Philippines) Mike Cabungan
- Physical Trainer:
  (Philippines) Gabriel Atienza

== 2024–25 All-Filipino Conference ==
=== Preliminary round ===
==== Standings ====
| Pos | Team | Pld | W | L | Pts | SW | SL | SR | SPW | SPL | SPR | Qualification |
|---|---|---|---|---|---|---|---|---|---|---|---|---|
| 1 | Creamline Cool Smashers | 11 | 10 | 1 | 29 | 32 | 8 | 4.000 | 970 | 816 | 1.189 | 2025 AVC Women's Champions League and Qualifying round |
| 2 | Petro Gazz Angels | 11 | 10 | 1 | 29 | 30 | 8 | 3.750 | 909 | 770 | 1.181 | 2025 AVC Women's Champions League and Qualifying round |
| 3 | Cignal HD Spikers | 11 | 8 | 3 | 25 | 27 | 12 | 2.250 | 909 | 794 | 1.145 | Qualifying round |
| 4 | PLDT High Speed Hitters | 11 | 8 | 3 | 23 | 27 | 13 | 2.077 | 927 | 842 | 1.101 | Qualifying round |
| 5 | Choco Mucho Flying Titans | 11 | 8 | 3 | 20 | 27 | 20 | 1.350 | 1064 | 1031 | 1.032 | Qualifying round |

Source: Premier Volleyball League

==== Match log ====
2024–25 PVL All-Filipino Conference preliminary round match log
Total: 8–3 (25 points)
November: 3–0 (9 points)

| Match | Date | Opponent | Sets | Total | Location Attendance | Record | Pts | Report |
|---|---|---|---|---|---|---|---|---|
| 1 | November 16, 2024 | Farm Fresh | 3–0 | 75–54 | Ynares Center; 3,853 | 1–0 | 3 | P2 |
| 2 | November 21, 2024 | Chery Tiggo | 3–1 | 95–83 | Filoil EcoOil Centre; 847 | 2–0 | 6 | P2 |
| 3 | November 28, 2024 | Choco Mucho | 3–1 | 95–83 | PhilSports Arena; 1,409 | 3–0 | 9 | P2 |

December: 1–1 (3 points)

| Match | Date | Opponent | Sets | Total | Location Attendance | Record | Pts | Report |
|---|---|---|---|---|---|---|---|---|
| 4 | December 7, 2024 | Nxled | 3–0 | 75–63 | Minglanilla Sports Complex; 4,205 | 4–0 | 12 | P2 |
| 5 | December 14, 2024 | Petro Gazz | 0–3 | 58–75 | PhilSports Arena; 950 | 4–1 | 12 | P2 |

January: 1–1 (3 points)

| Match | Date | Opponent | Sets | Total | Location Attendance | Record | Pts | Report |
|---|---|---|---|---|---|---|---|---|
| 6 | January 21, 2025 | Galeries Tower | 3–0 | 75–56 | PhilSports Arena; 817 | 5–1 | 15 | P2 |
| 7 | January 28, 2025 | PLDT | 1–3 | 88–95 | PhilSports Arena; 1,645 | 5–2 | 15 | P2 |

February: 4–0 (10 points)

| Match | Date | Opponent | Sets | Total | Location Attendance | Record | Pts | Report |
|---|---|---|---|---|---|---|---|---|
| 8 | February 1, 2025 | Creamline | 2–3 | 102–112 | PhilSports Arena; 4,603 | 5–3 | 16 | P2 |
| 9 | February 6, 2025 | Capital1 | 3–0 | 75–44 | PhilSports Arena; 2,525 | 6–3 | 19 | P2 |
| 10 | February 13, 2025 | Zus Coffee | 3–1 | 96–76 | Ninoy Aquino Stadium; 1,385 | 7–3 | 22 | P2 |
| 11 | February 18, 2025 | Akari | 3–0 | 75–53 | PhilSports Arena; 436 | 8–3 | 25 | P2 |

=== Qualifying round ===
==== Match log ====
2024–25 PVL All-Filipino Conference qualifying round match log
Total: 0–1 (0 points)
Qualifying round: 0–1 (0 points)

| Date | Opponent | Sets | Total | Location Attendance | Report |
|---|---|---|---|---|---|
| February 27, 2025 | Galeries Tower | 1–3 | 83–94 | PhilSports Arena; 802 | P2 |

=== Play-in tournament ===
==== Pool A standings ====
| Pos | Team | Pld | W | L | Pts | SW | SL | SR | SPW | SPL | SPR | Qualification |
|---|---|---|---|---|---|---|---|---|---|---|---|---|
| 1 | Zus Coffee Thunderbelles | 2 | 2 | 0 | 5 | 6 | 3 | 2.000 | 200 | 186 | 1.075 | Final round |
| 2 | Cignal HD Spikers | 2 | 1 | 1 | 4 | 5 | 4 | 1.250 | 202 | 185 | 1.092 | |
| 3 | Capital1 Solar Spikers | 2 | 0 | 2 | 0 | 2 | 6 | 0.333 | 159 | 190 | 0.837 | |

Source: Premier Volleyball League

==== Match log ====
2024–25 PVL All-Filipino Conference play-in tournament match log
Total: 1–1 (4 points)
Play-in tournament: 1–1 (4 points)

| Match | Date | Opponent | Sets | Total | Location Attendance | Record | Pts | Report |
|---|---|---|---|---|---|---|---|---|
| 1 | March 6, 2025 | Capital1 | 3–1 | 97–78 | PhilSports Arena; 614 | 1–0 | 3 | P2 |
| 2 | March 11, 2025 | Zus Coffee | 2–3 | 105–107 | PhilSports Arena; 677 | 1–1 | 4 | P2 |

== Transactions ==
=== Additions ===
| Player | Date signed | Previous team | Ref. |
|---|---|---|---|
| Ethan Arce | May 6, 2025 | Petro Gazz Angels | |
| Heather Guino-o | May 6, 2025 | Capital1 Solar Spikers | |
| Tin Tiamzon | May 6, 2025 | F2 Logistics Cargo Movers | |
| Erika Santos | May 16, 2025 | PLDT High Speed Hitters | |
| Pearl Denura | June 18, 2025 | NU Lady Bulldogs (UAAP) | |
| Jewel Encarnacion | October 9, 2025 | Galeries Tower Highrisers | |

=== Subtractions ===
| Player | New team | Ref. |
|---|---|---|
| Rachel Daquis | Farm Fresh Foxies | |
| Angelique Dionela | Farm Fresh Foxies | |
| Jovelyn Gonzaga | Zus Coffee Thunderbelles | |
| AJ Jingco | Farm Fresh Foxies | |
| Jerrili Malabanan | Capital1 Solar Spikers | |
| Anngela Nunag | Chery Tiggo Crossovers | |
| Glaudine Troncoso | Zus Coffee Thunderbelles | |
