= Premier Volleyball League Best Foreign Guest Player award =

Premier Volleyball League award

The Premier Volleyball Best Foreign Guest Player award is a Premier Volleyball League award given to the best performing foreign player in a conference. This award is only given out after the Reinforced Conference, which is the league's sole import-laden conference.

While no player has received the award more than once, players from the United States have won the award four times.

== Key ==
Player (#)	Denotes the number of times the player has been named Best Foreign Guest Player
Team (#)	Denotes the number of times a player from this team has won

== Winners ==
Year	Player	Nat.	Team	Ref.
2017	Michelle Strizak	United States	Pocari Sweat Lady Warriors	
2018	Tess Rountree	United States	PayMaya High Flyers	
2019	Wilma Salas	Cuba	Petro Gazz Angels	
2022	Lindsey Vander Weide	United States	Petro Gazz Angels (2)	
2024	María José Pérez	Venezuela	Cignal HD Spikers	
2025	Anna DeBeer	United States	Zus Coffee Thunderbelles	

== Teams ==
Awards	Team	Conferences
2	Petro Gazz Angels	2019, 2022

== By country ==
Awards	Team	Conferences
4	United States	2017, 2018, 2022, 2025
