= Premier Volleyball League Reinforced Conference =

Premier Volleyball League conference

- Most recent season or competition: 2025 Premier Volleyball League Reinforced Conference
- Sport: Volleyball
- Founded: 2017; 9 years ago
- First season: 2017
- Most recent champion: Petro Gazz (2025)
- Most titles: Petro Gazz (3 titles)

The Premier Volleyball League Reinforced Conference is one of three active conferences in the Premier Volleyball League (PVL). It is an import-laden conference where teams can sign a foreign player to their rosters. The conference succeeded the Reinforced Open Conference that was held in the Shakey's V-League. The Reinforced Conference was also held for the PVL's men's division in 2017 and 2018 before it was split back into Spikers' Turf.

In 2017, difficulties in securing international transfer certificates from the Fédération Internationale de Volleyball (FIVB) resulted in a delay for imports to compete in the PVL. In 2023, Philippine National Volleyball Federation (PNVF) sanctions restricted the PVL from hosting a Reinforced Conference that season. As such it was replaced by a second All-Filipino conference. In 2024, the Reinforced Conference was planned to be merged with the Invitational Conference as a single "Reinforced Invitational Conference", but that plan was scrapped and the two conferences continue to be held separately.

The Petro Gazz Angels are the most recent champions and most successful team in the Reinforced Conference, having won their third title in the 2025 Reinforced Conference. The Creamline Cool Smashers are the most successful among active teams, with two titles.

== Format history ==
In 2017, the Reinforced Conference featured an initial preliminary round, a double round-robin tournament where each team plays all other teams twice. The top two teams directly advanced to the semifinals while the remaining teams compete in the quarterfinals. The quarterfinals is an additional single round-robin where the top two teams clinch the final two berths in the semifinals. The semifinals and finals, as well as the third-place series, are best-of-three series. In 2018, the preliminary round was changed to a single round-robin. In 2019, the quarterfinal round was scrapped, with the top four teams advancing to the semifinals.

In 2022, the semifinal round was turned into a single round-robin between the top four teams of the prelims. The top two teams advanced to the finals while the bottom two move on to the battle for third.

In 2024, the format of the conference was changed entirely. Teams are split into two pools for the prelims. The preliminary round itself is split into two single round-robin tournaments. Sister teams cannot be placed in the same initial pool. After the first round-robin, the top three teams from one pool are merged with the bottom three teams from the other pool for the second round-robin. Teams will then play additional matches against teams they did not face in the first round. At the end of the split preliminary round, the top eight teams in combined records advance to the quarterfinals. All rounds in the final round, including the third-place series, are shortened to a single match. The 2024 edition of the conference also acted as a qualifier for the Invitational Conference.

== Medal table ==
=== Per season ===
Season	Champions	Runners-up	Third place	Details	Ref.
2017	Pocari Sweat Lady Warriors	BaliPure Purest Water Defenders	Creamline Cool Smashers	2017 Reinforced	
2018	Creamline Cool Smashers	PayMaya Highflyers	BanKo Perlas Spikers	2018 Reinforced	
2019	Petro Gazz Angels	Creamline Cool Smashers	Pacific Town-Army Lady Troopers	2019 Reinforced	
2022	Petro Gazz Angels	Cignal HD Spikers	Creamline Cool Smashers	2022 Reinforced	
2024–25	Creamline Cool Smashers	Akari Chargers	Cignal HD Spikers	2024 Reinforced	
2025–26	Petro Gazz Angels	Zus Coffee Thunderbelles	Akari Chargers	2025 Reinforced	

=== Per franchise ===
Inactive or former team

Franchise	Gold medal	Silver medal	Bronze medal	Total
Petro Gazz Angels	3	0	0	3
Creamline Cool Smashers	2	1	2	5
Pocari Sweat Lady Warriors	1	0	0	1
Akari Chargers	0	1	1	2
Cignal Super Spikers	0	1	1	2
BaliPure Purest Water Defenders	0	1	0	1
PayMaya Highflyers	0	1	0	1
Zus Coffee Thunderbelles	0	1	0	1
BanKo Perlas Spikers	0	0	1	1
Pacific Town-Army Lady Troopers	0	0	1	1
