= Premier Volleyball League Invitational Conference =

Premier Volleyball League conference

- Most recent season or competition: 2026 Premier Volleyball League Invitational Conference
- Sport: Volleyball
- Founded: 2022; 4 years ago
- First season: 2022
- Most recent champion: Est Cola (2026)
- Most titles: Creamline (2 titles)

The Premier Volleyball League Invitational Conference is one of three active conferences in the Premier Volleyball League (PVL). The conference was first held in 2022 making it the newest conference out of the three. The conference features foreign guest teams who are invited to compete against the PVL's local teams. The PVL's predecessor, the Shakey's V-League, previously held a SEA Club Invitational in 2011.

In 2022, Philippines women's national volleyball team was also given an invitation, but pulled out due to injury concerns.

In 2024, the Invitational Conference was planned to be merged with the Reinforced Conference as a single "Reinforced Invitational Conference", but that plan was scrapped and the two conferences continue to be held separately.

Est Cola from Thailand are the most recent champions, winning the 2026 Invitational Conference. Est Cola and the Kurashiki Ablaze from Japan are the only guest teams to have won the conference. The Creamline Cool Smashers have the most Invitational titles with two.

== Format history ==
In 2022 and 2023, all invited foreign guest teams received a bye into the final round. All local PVL teams start at the preliminary round, a single round-robin tournament where each team plays all other teams once. The top four teams join the guest teams in the semifinals, which is another single round-robin. The top two teams advance to the championship match while the third and fourth-ranked teams compete in a third place match, both of which consist of a single game as opposed to the best-of-three in other conferences.

For the 2023 edition, the local PVL teams were divided into two pools for the prelims. Sister teams cannot be placed into the same pool. The top two teams advance to the final round while teams ranked third through fifth take part in a classification match against the team with the same ranking from the other group.

In 2024, the structure of the conference was changed to only allow a selection of local PVL teams compete against the foreign teams. Instead of competing in an initial preliminary round, PVL teams qualify for the Invitational Conference by reaching the top four in a previous conference. Those teams are then invited to compete alongside the foreign teams in the new preliminary round, which is the former semifinal round. Qualified PVL teams have the option of backing out Invitational Conference participation, in which the highest-ranked team not qualified is given an invitation.

== Medal table ==
=== Per season ===
Season	Champions	Runners-up	Third place	Details	Ref.
2022	Creamline Cool Smashers	KingWhale Taipei (Note: Invited guest team) (Chinese Taipei)	Cignal HD Spikers	2022 Invitational	
2023	Kurashiki Ablaze (Japan)	Creamline Cool Smashers	Cignal HD Spikers	2023 Invitational	
2024–25	Creamline Cool Smashers	Cignal HD Spikers	Kurashiki Ablaze (Japan)	2024 Invitational	
2025–26	PLDT High Speed Hitters	Kobe Shinwa University (Japan)	Creamline Cool Smashers	2025 Invitational	
2026–27	Est Cola (Thailand)	Nxled Chameleons	PLDT High Speed Hitters	2026 Invitational	

=== Per team ===
Team	Gold medal	Silver medal	Bronze medal	Total
Creamline Cool Smashers	2	1	1	4
Kurashiki Ablaze (Japan)	1	0	1	2
PLDT High Speed Hitters	1	0	1	2
Est Cola (Thailand)	1	0	0	1
Cignal Super Spikers	0	1	2	3
KingWhale Taipei (Chinese Taipei)	0	1	0	1
Kobe Shinwa University (Japan)	0	1	0	1
Nxled Chameleons	0	1	0	1
