= Jackie Acuña =

Filipino volleyball player

Personal information
- Full name: Jacqueline Acuña
- Nationality: Filipino
- Born: July 28, 2000 (age 26)
- Hometown: Valenzuela City, Philippines
- Height: 1.80 m (5 ft 11 in)
- Education: National University

Volleyball information
- Position: Middle blocker
- Current team: Nxled Chameleons

Jacqueline Acuña (born July 28, 2000) is a Filipino professional volleyball player who is a middle blocker for the Nxled Chameleons of the Premier Volleyball League (PVL). She played for the NU Lady Bulldogs in college.

== Career ==
=== Collegiate ===
Acuña played for the Lady Bulldogs of the National University in the University Athletic Association of the Philippines (UAAP).

She played her last playing year in the UAAP in Season 84, where they bagged the championship title against De La Salle Lady Spikers.

=== Pro League ===
After playing her last playing year, she was signed by the Cignal HD Spikers.

== Clubs ==
- (Philippines) Cignal HD Spikers (2022–2026)
- (Philippines) Nxled Chameleons (2026–present)

== Awards ==
=== Individual ===
| Year | Conference | Award | Ref |
|---|---|---|---|
| 2024 | PVL; Invitational | 1st Best Middle Blocker | |

=== Collegiate ===
| Year | League | Season | Title | Ref |
|---|---|---|---|---|
| 2022 | UAAP | 84 | Champions | |

=== Clubs ===
| Year | League | Season/Conference | Club | Title | Ref |
|---|---|---|---|---|---|
| 2022 | PVL | Invitational | Cignal Super Spikers | 3rd Place | |
| 2022 | PVL | Reinforced | Cignal Super Spikers | Runner-up | |
| 2023 | PVL | Invitational | Cignal Super Spikers | 3rd Place | |
| 2023 | PVL | 2nd All-Filipino | Cignal Super Spikers | 3rd Place | |
| 2024 | PNVF | Champions League | Cignal Super Spikers | Runner-up | |
| 2024 | PVL | Reinforced | Cignal Super Spikers | 3rd Place | |
| 2024 | PVL | Invitational | Cignal Super Spikers | Runner-up | |
| 2026 | PVL | All-Filipino | Cignal Super Spikers | Runner-up | |
