= Beth Carey =

Australian female volleyball player

Personal information
- Nationality: Australian
- Born: 28 September 1990 (age 36)
- Height: 1.90 m (6 ft 3 in)
- Weight: 78 kg (172 lb)
- Spike: 300 cm (118 in)
- Block: 290 cm (114 in)

Volleyball information
- Current club: Cignal HD Spikers

Career
Years	Teams
2014	South Australia
2016	VfB Suhl

National team
2013–present	Australia

Beth Carey (born 28 September 1990) is an Australian female volleyball player. She is part of the Australia women's national volleyball team and is the current Captain.

She participated in the 2014 FIVB Volleyball World Grand Prix. On club level she played for South Australia in 2014 and VfB Suhl in 2016. She played for the Cignal HD Spikers in the Philippines in 2017.
