= Ishie Lalongisip =

Filipino volleyball player

Personal information
- Full name: Maria Rochelle Lalongisip
- Nickname: Ishie
- Nationality: Filipino
- Born: December 30, 2001 (age 24)
- Hometown: Batangas, Philippines
- Height: 5 ft 6 in (1.68 m)
- Education: Adamson University

Volleyball information
- Position: Opposite hitter
- Current club: Creamline Cool Smashers

Career
Years	Teams
2024–2026	Cignal HD Spikers
2026–present	Creamline Cool Smashers

Maria Rochelle "Ishie" Lalongisip (born December 30, 2001) is a Filipino professional volleyball player who is an opposite hitter for the Creamline Cool Smashers of the Premier Volleyball League (PVL). In college, she played for the Adamson Lady Falcons of the University Athletic Association of the Philippines (UAAP).

She was a former team captain of the Lady Baby Falcons of Adamson University.

== Career ==
First a volleyball player in her seventh grade, Lalongisip was part of the Batangas delegation in regional tournaments.

=== High school ===
Lalongisip played for the Adamson Lady Baby Falcons in the UAAP and became the team captain for two seasons beginning 2018.

=== Collegiate ===
Lalongisip led the Lady Falcons in their first win in Season 86 over the UP Lady Maroons on February 24, 2024.

=== Club ===
Lalongisip was drafted 7th overall by the Cignal HD Spikers in the first round of the PVL Draft on July 8, 2024.

On February 1, 2025, Lalongisip reset her career-high with 19 points, all off attacks, in Cignal's five-set loss to the unbeaten defending champion Creamline Cool Smashers.

After the PVL Press Corps gave her the Player of the Week honors, Lalongisip topscored with 20 points as the rookie led the Cignal win over the ZUS Coffee Thunderbelles in five sets on February 13, 2025.

After Cignal left the PVL, Lalongisip was signed in by Creamline in June 2026.

== Personal life ==
Lalongisip was raised in Batangas. Volleyball became part of her early lifestyle in the province as her volleyball player-mother was her influence.

== Awards and recognition ==
- 2024 PVL Reinforced Conference Bronze medal, with the Cignal HD Spikers
