= 2024 Premier Volleyball League Reinforced Conference =

Second conference of the 2024 PVL season

- Duration: July 16 – September 4, 2024
- Teams: 12
- Matches: 56
- Attendance: 106,729 (1,906 per match)
- TV partner(s): One Sports; One Sports+ Pilipinas Live; RPTV

Results
- Champions: Creamline Cool Smashers
- Runners-up: Akari Chargers
- Third place: Cignal HD Spikers
- Fourth place: PLDT High Speed Hitters

Awards
- Conference MVP: Bernadeth Pons
- Finals MVP: Bernadeth Pons
- Best OH: Brooke Van Sickle; Grethcel Soltones
- Best MB: Lourdes Clemente; Mary Joy Baron
- Best OPP: Trisha Tubu
- Best Setter: Gel Cayuna
- Best Libero: Alyssa Eroa

PVL Reinforced Conference chronology
- < 2022 2025 >

PVL conference chronology
- < 2024 All-Filipino 2024 Invitational >

The 2024 Premier Volleyball League Reinforced Conference was the second conference of the 2024–25 Premier Volleyball League season. It was originally slated to be a merged tournament of the Invitational and Reinforced Conferences, but PVL Commissioner Sherwin Malonzo announced in a simultaneous interview during the commencement of the 2024 PVL Draft Combine that this would be a stand-alone Reinforced tournament and that the Invitational Conference would start in September.

Twelve teams competed in this conference, grouped into two pools. Each team was allowed to be reinforced by one foreign player. Strong Group Athletics changed its name to Zus Coffee Thunderbelles.

== Changes ==
=== PVL Draft ===
The PVL Rookie Draft was conducted before the start of the conference. The draft required candidates to have neither playing experience nor academic qualifications. It was open to all aspiringz Filipino and Filipino-foreign citizens over age 21 who wanted to play in the professional league.

The application for the Rookie Draft was originally scheduled to end on May 31, 2024. PVL Commissioner Malonzo later announced that it would be moved to June 12, 2024, so that rookies could have time to prepare documents needed for the draft.

The draft combine was held on June 25–26, 2024, and the draft proper was held on July 8, 2024.

=== Exclusion of national team players ===
PVL players on the Philippine women's national volleyball team were excluded from the upcoming conference, as the national team season of the FIVB calendar was ongoing. The national team suited up for the 2024 FIVB Women's Volleyball Challenger Cup, and would prepare for the 2024 SEA Women's V.League.

== Participating teams ==
2024 Premier Volleyball League Reinforced Conference
Abbr.	Team	Affiliation	Head coach	Team captain
AKA	Akari Chargers	Akari Lighting & Technology	(Japan) Takayuki Minowa	(Philippines) Michelle Cobb
CAP	Capital1 Solar Spikers	CapitalOne Energy Corp.	(Philippines) Roger Gorayeb	(Philippines) Jorelle Singh
CTC	Chery Tiggo Crossovers	United Asia Automotive Group	(Philippines) Kungfu Reyes	(Philippines) Aby Maraño
CMF	Choco Mucho Flying Titans	Republic Biscuit Corporation	(Philippines) Dante Alinsunurin	(Philippines) Maddie Madayag
CHD	Cignal HD Spikers	Cignal TV, Inc.	(Philippines) Shaq Delos Santos	(Philippines) Frances Molina
CCS	Creamline Cool Smashers	Republic Biscuit Corporation	(Philippines) Sherwin Meneses	(Philippines) Michele Gumabao (interim)
FFF	Farm Fresh Foxies	Farm Fresh Philippine International / Strong Group Athletics	(Japan) Shota Sato	(Philippines) Louie Romero
GTH	Galeries Tower Highrisers	Grand Taipan Land Development	(Philippines) Lerma Giron	(Philippines) Alyssa Eroa
NXL	Nxled Chameleons	Akari Lighting & Technology	(China) Chen Gang	(Philippines) Janel Maraguinot
PGA	Petro Gazz Angels	Petro Gazz Ventures Phils.	(Japan) Koji Tsuzurabara	(Philippines) Mary Remy Joy Palma
HSH	PLDT High Speed Hitters	PLDT Inc.	(Philippines) Rald Ricafort	(Philippines) Kath Arado
ZUS	Zus Coffee Thunderbelles	Zus Coffee / Strong Group Athletics	(Philippines) Jerry Yee	(Philippines) Cloanne Mondoñedo

== Pools composition ==
The teams were grouped into two pools using the serpentine system, with the 2024 All-Filipino Conference final standings as the basis for the top nine teams. Like the 2023 Premier Volleyball League Invitational Conference, the league ensures that sister teams are not drawn into the same pool. If the sister teams of Farm Fresh and Zus Coffee happened to be placed in Pool A using the serpentine system, for example, they would be separated to prevent immediate collision between them. Thus, Farm Fresh (9th) and Galeries (10th) would be placed in Pool A, and Capital1 (11th) and Zus Coffee (12th) placed in Pool B.

Pool A	Pool B
Creamline Cool Smashers (1)	Choco Mucho Flying Titans (2)
Chery Tiggo Crossovers (4)	Petro Gazz Angels (3)
PLDT High Speed Hitters (5)	Cignal HD Spikers (6)
Nxled Chameleons (8)	Akari Chargers (7)
Farm Fresh Foxies (9)	Capital1 Solar Spikers (11)
Galeries Tower Highrisers (10)	Zus Coffee Thunderbelles (12)

== Venues ==
All rounds	Second and final rounds	
Pasig	Pasay	San Juan
PhilSports Arena	SM Mall of Asia Arena	Filoil EcoOil Centre
Capacity: 10,000	Capacity: 20,000	Capacity: 6,000

== Transactions ==
=== National team players ===
The following players were part of the Philippine national team that played at the 2024 AVC Women's Challenge Cup, 2024 FIVB Women's Volleyball Challenger Cup and 2024 SEA Women's V.League. They were therefore excluded from this conference.

Team	Player/s	
Akari Chargers	Faith Nisperos	Fifi Sharma
Chery Tiggo Crossovers	Eya Laure	Jen Nierva
Choco Mucho Flying Titans	Cherry Nunag	Sisi Rondina
Cignal HD Spikers	Vanie Gandler	Dawn Macandili-Catindig
Creamline Cool Smashers	Jema Galanza	—N/a
Galeries Tower Highrisers	Julia Coronel	—N/a
PLDT High Speed Hitters	Dell Palomata	—N/a
Zus Coffee Thunderbelles	Thea Gagate	—N/a

=== Team additions and transfers ===
The following players transferred to another team for the upcoming conference.

Player	Moving from	Moving to	Ref.
Camille Victoria	Nxled Chameleons	Akari Chargers	
Danielle Theris Ravena	Nxled Chameleons	Akari Chargers	
Ivy Keith Lacsina	Nxled Chameleons	Akari Chargers	
Kamille Cal	Nxled Chameleons	Akari Chargers	
Cathrine Almazan	EAC Lady Generals (NCAA)	Akari Chargers	
Ysabela Bakabak	DLSU Lady Spikers (UAAP)	Akari Chargers	
Iris Tolenada	GS Caltex Seoul Kixx (South Korean V-League)	Capital1 Solar Spikers	
Shola Alvarez	Galeries Tower Highrisers	Capital1 Solar Spikers	
Norielle Ipac	Galeries Tower Highrisers	Capital1 Solar Spikers	
Ayumi Furukawa	Strong Group Athletics	Capital1 Solar Spikers	
Mary Rhose Dapol	Perpetual Lady Altas (NCAA)	Chery Tiggo Crossovers	
Lutgarda Malaluan	PLDT High Speed Hitters	Choco Mucho Flying Titans	
Judith Abil	Nxled Chameleons	Cignal HD Spikers	
Mary Angelei Jingco	Quezon City Gerflor Defenders	Cignal HD Spikers	
Dindin Santiago-Manabat	Akari Chargers	Choco Mucho Flying Titans	
Roselle Baliton	Akari Chargers	Galeries Tower Highrisers	
Shannen Palec	Marikina Lady Shoemasters (MPVA)	Galeries Tower Highrisers	
Bang Pineda	Akari Chargers	Nxled Chameleons	
Trisha Genesis	Akari Chargers	Nxled Chameleons	
Jaja Maraguinot	Akari Chargers	Nxled Chameleons	
Mary Anne Esguerra	Galeries Tower Highrisers	Nxled Chameleons	
Cloanne Mondoñedo	Benilde Lady Blazers (NCAA)	Zus Coffee Thunderbelles	
Gayle Pascual	Benilde Lady Blazers (NCAA)	Zus Coffee Thunderbelles	
Jade Gentapa	Benilde Lady Blazers (NCAA)	Zus Coffee Thunderbelles	
Mich Gamit	Benilde Lady Blazers (NCAA)	Zus Coffee Thunderbelles	
Ypril Jyrhine Tapia	Farm Fresh Foxies	Zus Coffee Thunderbelles	
Jaycel Ann Delos Reyes	Farm Fresh Foxies	Zus Coffee Thunderbelles	
Julia Angeles	Farm Fresh Foxies	Zus Coffee Thunderbelles	
Danivah Aying	Galeries Tower Highrisers	Zus Coffee Thunderbelles	

=== Foreign guest players ===
The following were the foreign guest players for the upcoming conference. Each team were only allowed to have one foreign player, and could only replace them mid-conference if they suffered from injuries or if the player (not the team) abandoned their commitment.

Team	Foreign player	Moving from	Ref.
Akari Chargers	(United States) Oluoma Okaro	(Greece) ASP Thetis	
Capital1 Solar Spikers	(Russia) Marina Tushova	(Russia) Sparta Nizhny Novgorod	
Chery Tiggo Crossovers	(United States) Katherine Bell	(United States) Vegas Thrill	
Choco Mucho Flying Titans	(Greece) Zoi Faki	(Greece) Apollon Kalamatas	
Cignal HD Spikers	(Venezuela) María José Pérez	(Egypt) Alexandria Sporting Club	
Creamline Cool Smashers	(United States) Erica Staunton	(Finland) Oriveden Ponnistus	
Farm Fresh Foxies	(Colombia) Yeny Murillo	(Czech Republic) TJ Sokol Frýdek-Místek	
Galeries Tower Highrisers	(Brazil) Monique Helena (replaced; did not play)	(Brazil) ABEL Moda Vôlei	
Galeries Tower Highrisers	(Thailand) Sutadta Chuewulim	(Thailand) Diamond Food–Fine Chef	
Nxled Chameleons	(China) Jiang Xuanyao (replaced; did not play)	(China) Sichuan Wuliangchun	
Nxled Chameleons	(United States) Meegan Hart	(Cyprus) Olympiada Neapolis VB	
Petro Gazz Angels	(Cuba) Wilma Salas	(Turkey) Beşiktaş Ayos	
PLDT High Speed Hitters	(Russia) Elena Samoilenko	(Kazakhstan) Turan Turkistan	
Zus Coffee Thunderbelles	(Japan) Asaka Tamaru	(Japan) Kurashiki Ablaze	

=== Drafted players ===
The following were the drafted rookie players starting this conference.

	Pick order determined through lottery
Player (in italic text)	Unsigned draftee

Team	1st round		2nd round		3rd round		4th round	
Team	Pick	Player	Pick	Player	Pick	Player	Pick	Player
Zus Coffee Thunderbelles	1	Thea Gagate	13	Sharya Ancheta	19	Nikka Yandoc	22	Jenina Zeta
Capital1 Solar Spikers	2	Leila Cruz	14	Roma Mae Doromal	20	Giliana Torres	passed	
Galeries Tower Highrisers	3	Julia Coronel	15	Jewel Encarnacion	21	Dodee Batindaan	23	Danivah Aying^{a}
Farm Fresh Foxies	4	Maicah Larroza	16	Pierre Abellana	passed			
Nxled Chameleons	5	Lucille Almonte	17	Razel Aldea	passed			
Akari Chargers	6	Stephanie Bustrillo	passed		passed			
Cignal HD Spikers	7	Ishie Lalongisip	passed		passed			
PLDT High Speed Hitters	8	Angelica Alcantara	passed		passed			
Chery Tiggo Crossovers	9	Karen Verdeflor	passed		passed			
Petro Gazz Angels	10	Antonette Adolfo	18	Donnalyn Paralejas	passed			
Choco Mucho Flying Titans	11	Lorraine Pecaña	passed		passed			
Creamline Cool Smashers	12	Aleiah Torres	passed		passed			

Note
a.Originally drafted by the Galeries Tower Highrisers, Aying was not able to secure a signed contract with Galeries within the given timeline, making her an unsigned draftee (free agent). The Zus Coffee Thunderbelles subsequently acquired her through a special draft for unsigned draftees.

=== Coaching changes ===
Team	Outgoing coach	Manner of departure	Replaced by	Ref.
Akari Chargers	(Philippines) Raffy Mosuela	traded to Nxled Chameleons	(Japan) Takayuki Minowa	
Farm Fresh Foxies	(Philippines) Jerry Yee	moved to Zus Coffee Thunderbelles	(Japan) Shota Sato	
Nxled Chameleons	(Japan) Takayuki Minowa	traded to Akari Chargers	(China) Chen Gang	
Zus Coffee Thunderbelles	(Philippines) Rogelio Getigan	Reassigned	(Philippines) Jerry Yee	

== Format ==
The following format was conducted for the entirety of the conference:

First round

1. Single round-robin format; two pools.
2. Teams are ranked using the FIVB Ranking System.
3. The top three teams from each pool will move on to a second-round crossover with the bottom three teams from the other pool.

Second round

1. Single round-robin format; two pools.
2. The results and the points of the matches between the same teams already played during the first round shall carry over to this round.
3. Teams are ranked using the FIVB Ranking System.
4. The eight teams with the best combined win-loss records will advance to the quarterfinals regardless of their pools.

Quarterfinals

1. All games are knockout matches.
2. QF1: #1 vs #8
3. QF2: #2 vs #7
4. QF3: #3 vs #6
5. QF4: #4 vs #5

Semifinals

1. All games are knockout matches.
2. SF1: QF1 Winner vs. QF4 Winner
3. SF2: QF2 Winner vs. QF3 Winner

Finals

1. All games are knockout matches.
2. Bronze medal: SF1 Loser vs SF2 Loser
3. Gold medal: SF1 Winner vs SF2 Winner

Invitational Conference

- The semifinalists of this conference will qualify for the 2024 Premier Volleyball League Invitational Conference.

== Pool standing procedure ==
- First, teams are ranked by the number of matches won.
- If the number of matches won is tied, the tied teams are then ranked by match points, wherein:
  - Match won 3–0 or 3–1: 3 match points for the winner, 0 match points for the loser.
  - Match won 3–2: 2 match points for the winner, 1 match point for the loser.
- In case of any further ties, the following criteria shall be used:
  - Set ratio: the number of sets won divided by number of sets lost.
  - Point ratio: the number of points scored divided by the number of points allowed.
  - Head-to-head standings: any remaining tied teams are ranked based on the results of head-to-head matches involving the teams in question.

== First round ==
- All times are Philippine Standard Time (UTC+08:00).
- Matches played on August 8 were originally scheduled on July 25, but were postponed due to the heavy rains in Metro Manila caused by the southwest monsoon enhanced by Super Typhoon Gaemi (Carina).

=== Pool A ===
Pos	Team	Pld	W	L	Pts	SW	SL	SR	SPW	SPL	SPR	Qualification
1	Creamline Cool Smashers	5	4	1	13	14	6	2.333	484	427	1.133	Pool C
2	PLDT High Speed Hitters	5	4	1	12	14	5	2.800	436	393	1.109	Pool C
3	Chery Tiggo Crossovers	5	4	1	11	13	6	2.167	437	398	1.098	Pool C
4	Farm Fresh Foxies	5	2	3	5	7	11	0.636	410	413	0.993	Pool D
5	Nxled Chameleons	5	1	4	2	3	14	0.214	340	408	0.833	Pool D
6	Galeries Tower Highrisers	5	0	5	2	6	15	0.400	447	514	0.870	Pool D

Source: Premier Volleyball League

Date	Time	Venue		Score		Set 1	Set 2	Set 3	Set 4	Set 5	Total	Report
Jul 16	14:00	PSA	Galeries Tower Highrisers	2–3	Nxled Chameleons	19–25	25–22	18–25	27–25	12–15	101–112	P2
Jul 16	16:00	PSA	Chery Tiggo Crossovers	3–0	Farm Fresh Foxies	25–13	27–25	25–22			77–60	P2
Jul 16	18:00	PSA	Creamline Cool Smashers	2–3	PLDT High Speed Hitters	25–16	22–25	26–24	19–25	12–15	104–105	P2
Jul 20	14:00	PSA	Nxled Chameleons	0–3	Chery Tiggo Crossovers	16–25	20–25	23–25			59–75	P2
Jul 20	16:00	PSA	PLDT High Speed Hitters	3–0	Galeries Tower Highrisers	25–19	25–16	25–17			75–52	P2
Jul 20	18:00	PSA	Farm Fresh Foxies	1–3	Creamline Cool Smashers	26–24	23–25	21–25	16–25		86–99	P2
Jul 30	13:00	PSA	Farm Fresh Foxies	3–2	Galeries Tower Highrisers	25–22	35–37	23–25	25–20	15–10	123–114	P2
Jul 30	15:00	PSA	Chery Tiggo Crossovers	1–3	Creamline Cool Smashers	20–25	26–24	16–25	19–25		81–99	P2
Jul 30	17:00	PSA	Nxled Chameleons	0–3	PLDT High Speed Hitters	30–32	18–25	17–25			65–82	P2
Aug 3	13:00	PSA	Nxled Chameleons	0–3	Farm Fresh Foxies	16–25	15–25	17–25			48–75	P2
Aug 3	15:00	PSA	Galeries Tower Highrisers	1–3	Creamline Cool Smashers	25–27	28–26	27–29	19–25		99–107	P2
Aug 3	17:00	PSA	PLDT High Speed Hitters	2–3	Chery Tiggo Crossovers	19–25	25–20	20–25	25–21	10–15	99–106	P2
Aug 8	13:00	PSA	Farm Fresh Foxies	0–3	PLDT High Speed Hitters	20–25	23–25	23–25			66–75	P2
Aug 8	15:00	PSA	Creamline Cool Smashers	3–0	Nxled Chameleons	25–18	25–18	25–20			75–56	P2
Aug 8	17:00	PSA	Galeries Tower Highrisers	1–3	Chery Tiggo Crossovers	17–25	25–22	23–25	16–25		81–97	P2

=== Pool B ===
Pos	Team	Pld	W	L	Pts	SW	SL	SR	SPW	SPL	SPR	Qualification
1	Akari Chargers	5	5	0	13	15	6	2.500	477	442	1.079	Pool D
2	Cignal HD Spikers	5	4	1	12	13	5	2.600	431	372	1.159	Pool D
3	Capital1 Solar Spikers	5	3	2	8	11	9	1.222	422	427	0.988	Pool D
4	Petro Gazz Angels	5	2	3	7	8	9	0.889	386	380	1.016	Pool C
5	Choco Mucho Flying Titans	5	1	4	5	7	13	0.538	412	427	0.965	Pool C
6	Zus Coffee Thunderbelles	5	0	5	0	3	15	0.200	370	432	0.856	Pool C

Source: Premier Volleyball League

Date	Time	Venue		Score		Set 1	Set 2	Set 3	Set 4	Set 5	Total	Report
Jul 18	14:00	PSA	Petro Gazz Angels	3–0	Zus Coffee Thunderbelles	25–16	25–21	25–21			75–58	P2
Jul 18	16:00	PSA	Akari Chargers	3–1	Capital1 Solar Spikers	25–18	27–25	22–25	25–14		99–82	P2
Jul 18	18:00	PSA	Cignal HD Spikers	3–0	Choco Mucho Flying Titans	25–18	25–21	25–16			75–55	P2
Jul 23	13:00	PSA	Zus Coffee Thunderbelles	1–3	Cignal HD Spikers	18–25	27–29	25–21	22–25		92–100	P2
Jul 23	15:00	PSA	Choco Mucho Flying Titans	2–3	Akari Chargers	25–18	25–16	21–25	23–25	13–15	107–99	P2
Jul 23	17:00	PSA	Capital1 Solar Spikers	3–0	Petro Gazz Angels	26–24	25–20	25–18			76–62	P2
Jul 27	13:00	PSA	Cignal HD Spikers	3–1	Capital1 Solar Spikers	25–20	25–17	23–25	25–13		98–75	P2
Jul 27	15:00	PSA	Akari Chargers	3–2	Petro Gazz Angels	23–25	21–25	25–23	29–27	16–14	114–114	P2
Jul 27	17:00	PSA	Zus Coffee Thunderbelles	1–3	Choco Mucho Flying Titans	25–14	20–25	19–25	18–25		82–89	P2
Aug 1	13:00	PSA	Petro Gazz Angels	0–3	Cignal HD Spikers	19–25	19–25	22–25			60–75	P2
Aug 1	15:00	PSA	Capital1 Solar Spikers	3–2	Choco Mucho Flying Titans	13–25	25–21	18–25	25–20	15–13	96–104	P2
Aug 1	17:00	PSA	Zus Coffee Thunderbelles	0–3	Akari Chargers	18–25	15–25	23–25			56–75	P2
Aug 6	13:00	PSA	Akari Chargers	3–1	Cignal HD Spikers	15–25	25–17	25–19	25–22		90–83	P2
Aug 6	15:00	PSA	Capital1 Solar Spikers	3–1	Zus Coffee Thunderbelles	18–25	25–20	25–19	25–18		93–82	P2
Aug 6	17:00	PSA	Choco Mucho Flying Titans	0–3	Petro Gazz Angels	18–25	21–25	18–25			57–75	P2

== Second round ==
- All times are Philippine Standard Time (UTC+08:00).

=== Pool C ===
Pos	Team	Pld	W	L	Pts	SW	SL	SR	SPW	SPL	SPR	Qualification
1	Creamline Cool Smashers	8	6	2	20	22	10	2.200	744	653	1.139	Quarterfinals
2	PLDT High Speed Hitters	8	6	2	19	22	9	2.444	713	622	1.146	Quarterfinals
3	Chery Tiggo Crossovers	8	5	3	15	18	12	1.500	649	635	1.022	Quarterfinals
4	Petro Gazz Angels	8	5	3	14	17	13	1.308	676	638	1.060	Quarterfinals
5	Choco Mucho Flying Titans	8	2	6	7	11	21	0.524	661	693	0.954	
6	Zus Coffee Thunderbelles	8	0	8	0	3	24	0.125	505	657	0.769	

Source: Premier Volleyball League

Date	Time	Venue		Score		Set 1	Set 2	Set 3	Set 4	Set 5	Total	Report
Aug 13	13:00	PSA	Chery Tiggo Crossovers	2–3	Choco Mucho Flying Titans	16–25	11–25	25–23	25–19	12–15	89–107	P2
Aug 13	15:00	PSA	Creamline Cool Smashers	2–3	Petro Gazz Angels	23–25	19–25	25–20	25–23	12–15	104–108	P2
Aug 13	17:00	PSA	PLDT High Speed Hitters	3–0	Zus Coffee Thunderbelles	25–18	25–14	25–12			75–44	P2
Aug 17	13:00	MOA	Zus Coffee Thunderbelles	0–3	Chery Tiggo Crossovers	18–25	18–25	19–25			55–75	P2
Aug 17	15:00	MOA	Petro Gazz Angels	3–2	PLDT High Speed Hitters	22–25	25–19	25–23	19–25	16–14	107–106	P2
Aug 17	17:00	MOA	Choco Mucho Flying Titans	0–3	Creamline Cool Smashers	16–25	19–25	29–31			64–81	P2
Aug 22	13:00	FEC	Creamline Cool Smashers	3–0	Zus Coffee Thunderbelles	25–17	25–15	25–22			75–54	P2
Aug 22	15:00	FEC	PLDT High Speed Hitters	3–1	Choco Mucho Flying Titans	21–25	25–18	25–16	25–19		96–78	P2
Aug 22	17:00	FEC	Chery Tiggo Crossovers	0–3	Petro Gazz Angels	20–25	16–25	12–25			48–75	P2

=== Pool D ===
Pos	Team	Pld	W	L	Pts	SW	SL	SR	SPW	SPL	SPR	Qualification
1	Akari Chargers	8	8	0	21	24	9	2.667	761	678	1.122	Quarterfinals
2	Cignal HD Spikers	8	7	1	20	22	8	2.750	648	562	1.153	Quarterfinals
3	Capital1 Solar Spikers	8	5	3	13	17	15	1.133	688	677	1.016	Quarterfinals
4	Farm Fresh Foxies	8	3	5	8	11	17	0.647	635	651	0.975	Quarterfinals
5	Nxled Chameleons	8	1	7	3	6	23	0.261	510	609	0.837	
6	Galeries Tower Highrisers	8	0	8	4	11	24	0.458	728	842	0.865	

Source: Premier Volleyball League

Date	Time	Venue		Score		Set 1	Set 2	Set 3	Set 4	Set 5	Total	Report
Aug 10	13:00	PSA	Akari Chargers	3–2	Galeries Tower Highrisers	23–25	25–15	25–16	22–25	18–16	113–97	P2
Aug 10	15:00	PSA	Cignal HD Spikers	3–1	Farm Fresh Foxies	25–23	28–26	25–27	25–14		103–90	P2
Aug 10	17:00	PSA	Nxled Chameleons	2–3	Capital1 Solar Spikers	25–20	25–20	16–25	19–25	6–15	91–105	P2
Aug 15	13:00	PSA	Capital1 Solar Spikers	0–3	Farm Fresh Foxies	17–25	23–25	20–25			60–75	P2
Aug 15	15:00	PSA	Akari Chargers	3–1	Nxled Chameleons	21–25	25–19	25–17	25–18		96–79	P2
Aug 15	17:00	PSA	Cignal HD Spikers	3–2	Galeries Tower Highrisers	23–25	25–22	26–28	25–14	15–11	114–100	P2
Aug 20	13:00	FEC	Galeries Tower Highrisers	1–3	Capital1 Solar Spikers	13–25	28–26	22–25	21–25		84–101	P2
Aug 20	15:00	FEC	Nxled Chameleons	0–3	Cignal HD Spikers	25–27	20–25	20–25			65–77	P2
Aug 20	17:00	FEC	Farm Fresh Foxies	0–3	Akari Chargers	19–25	22–25	19–25			60–75	P2

== Combined ranking ==
Pos	Team	Pld	W	L	Pts	SW	SL	SR	SPW	SPL	SPR	Qualification
1	Akari Chargers	8	8	0	21	24	9	2.667	686	618	1.110	Quarterfinals
2	Cignal HD Spikers	8	7	1	20	22	8	2.750	648	562	1.153	Quarterfinals
3	Creamline Cool Smashers	8	6	2	20	22	9	2.444	744	653	1.139	Quarterfinals
4	PLDT High Speed Hitters	8	6	2	19	22	9	2.444	713	622	1.146	Quarterfinals
5	Chery Tiggo Crossovers	8	5	3	15	18	12	1.500	649	635	1.022	Quarterfinals
6	Petro Gazz Angels	8	5	3	14	17	13	1.308	676	638	1.060	Quarterfinals
7	Capital1 Solar Spikers	8	5	3	13	17	15	1.133	688	677	1.016	Quarterfinals
8	Farm Fresh Foxies	8	3	5	8	11	17	0.647	575	576	0.998	Quarterfinals
9	Choco Mucho Flying Titans	8	2	6	7	11	21	0.524	661	693	0.954	
10	Nxled Chameleons	8	1	7	3	6	23	0.261	510	609	0.837	
11	Galeries Tower Highrisers	8	0	8	4	11	24	0.458	728	842	0.865	
12	Zus Coffee Thunderbelles	8	0	8	0	3	24	0.125	505	657	0.769	

Source: Premier Volleyball League

== Final round ==
- All times are Philippine Standard Time (UTC+08:00).
- The finals games were initially scheduled on September 2, but moved to September 4 due to Typhoon Enteng (Yagi).

Quarterfinals
August 24
1 Akari	3
8 Farm Fresh	1
August 27
4 PLDT	3
5 Chery Tiggo	2
August 24
2 Cignal	3
7 Capital1	2
August 27
3 Creamline	3
6 Petro Gazz	0

Semifinals
August 31
Akari	3
PLDT	2
August 31
Cignal	2
Creamline	3

Championship
September 4
Akari	0
Creamline	3
3rd place match
September 4
PLDT	1
Cignal	3

=== Quarterfinals ===
Date	Time	Venue		Score		Set 1	Set 2	Set 3	Set 4	Set 5	Total	Report
Aug 24	16:00	FEC	Cignal HD Spikers	3–2	Capital1 Solar Spikers	25–19	36–34	16–25	22–25	15–12	114–115	P2
Aug 24	18:00	FEC	Akari Chargers	3–1	Farm Fresh Foxies	17–25	25–18	25–22	25–23		92–88	P2
Aug 27	16:00	FEC	PLDT High Speed Hitters	3–2	Chery Tiggo Crossovers	25–23	25–27	15–25	25–18	15–9	105–102	P2
Aug 27	18:00	FEC	Creamline Cool Smashers	3–0	Petro Gazz Angels	25–23	25–19	25–18			75–60	P2

=== Semifinals ===
Date	Time	Venue		Score		Set 1	Set 2	Set 3	Set 4	Set 5	Total	Report
Aug 31	14:30	MOA	PLDT High Speed Hitters	2–3	Akari Chargers	22–25	25–18	25–22	24–26	15–17	111–108	P2
Aug 31	16:30	MOA	Creamline Cool Smashers	3–2	Cignal HD Spikers	20–25	26–28	25–18	27–25	15–13	113–109	P2

=== Finals ===
==== 3rd place match ====
Date	Time	Venue		Score		Set 1	Set 2	Set 3	Set 4	Set 5	Total	Report
Sep 4	16:00	PSA	PLDT High Speed Hitters	1–3	Cignal HD Spikers	25–21	19–25	18–25	23–25		85–96	P2

==== Championship match ====
Date	Time	Venue		Score		Set 1	Set 2	Set 3	Set 4	Set 5	Total	Report
Sep 4	18:00	PSA	Akari Chargers	0–3	Creamline Cool Smashers	15–25	23–25	17–25			55–75	P2

== Final standing ==
Rank	Team
1st place, gold medalist(s)	Creamline Cool Smashers
2nd place, silver medalist(s)	Akari Chargers
3rd place, bronze medalist(s)	Cignal HD Spikers
4	PLDT High Speed Hitters
5	Chery Tiggo Crossovers
6	Petro Gazz Angels
7	Capital1 Solar Spikers
8	Farm Fresh Foxies
9	Choco Mucho Flying Titans
10	Nxled Chameleons
11	Galeries Tower Highrisers
12	Zus Coffee Thunderbelles

Qualified for the 2024 PVL Invitational Conference
Invited to the 2024 PVL Invitational Conference

- All semifinalists were already qualified for the upcoming 2024 Invitational Conference. However, PLDT High Speed Hitters declined participation. The next ranked teams Chery Tiggo, Petro Gazz and Capital1 declined participation in the Invitational Conference. The Farm Fresh Foxies would be replacing PLDT.
- Akari Chargers also pulled out, and the league was no longer inviting a replacement team.

2024 PVL Reinforced champions
Creamline Cool Smashers
Ninth title

Team roster
Alyssa Valdez (c), Kyle Negrito, Floremel Rodriguez, Risa Sato, Jeanette Panaga, Michele Gumabao, Ella de Jesus, Lorie Bernardo, Pau Soriano, Kyla Atienza, Denden Lazaro-Revilla, Bea de Leon, Theo Bea Bonafe, Rizza Mandapat, Rosemarie Vargas, Jema Galanza, Bernadeth Pons, Mafe Galanza, Tots Carlos, Erica Staunton, Aleiah Torres
Head coach
Sherwin Meneses

== Awards and medalists ==
=== Awards ===
Award	Player	Team	Ref.
Conference Most Valuable Player	Bernadeth Pons	Creamline	
Finals Most Valuable Player	Bernadeth Pons	Creamline	
Rookie of the Conference	Shayra Ancheta	Zus Coffee	
1st Best Outside Spiker	Brooke Van Sickle	Petro Gazz	
2nd Best Outside Spiker	Grethcel Soltones	Akari	
1st Best Middle Blocker	Mary Joy Baron	PLDT	
2nd Best Middle Blocker	Maria Lourdes Clemente	Capital1	
Best Opposite Spiker	Trisha Gayle Tubu	Farm Fresh	
Best Setter	Gel Cayuna	Cignal	
Best Libero	Alyssa Eroa	Galeries Tower	
Best Foreign Guest Player	María José Pérez	Cignal	

=== Medalists ===
Gold	Silver	Bronze
Creamline Cool Smashers: Alyssa Valdez (c); Kyle Negrito; Floremel Rodriguez; Risa Sato; Jeanette Panaga; Michele Gumabao; Ella de Jesus; Lorie Bernardo; Pau Soriano; Kyla Atienza (L); Denden Lazaro-Revilla (L); Bea De Leon; Theo Bea Bonafe; Rizza Mandapat; Rosemarie Vargas; Jema Galanza (NT); Bernadeth Pons; Maria Fe Galanza; Tots Carlos; Erica Staunton (I); Aleiah Torres	Akari Chargers: Michelle Cobb (c); Dani Ravena (L); Max Juangco (L); Oluoma Okaro (I); Grethcel Soltones; Camille Victoria; Janine Marciano; Ezra Madrigal; Erika Raagas; Ysabela Bakabak; Celine Domingo; Fifi Sharma (NT); Cathrine Almazan; Stephanie Bustrillo; Ivy Lacsina; Faith Nisperos (NT); Kamille Cal; Eli Soyud	Cignal HD Spikers: Frances Molina (c); Glaudine Troncoso; Roselyn Doria; Angelique Dionela (L); Geneveve Casugod; Vanie Gandler (NT); Rochelle Lalongisip; Jovelyn Fernandez; Judith Abil (L); Toni Basas; Jacqueline Acuña; Gyzelle Sy; Angelei Jingco; María José Pérez (I); Ria Meneses; Dawn Macandili-Catindig (L) (NT); Gel Cayuna
Head coach: Sherwin Meneses	Head coach: Takayuki Minowa	Head coach: Shaq Delos Santos

== Statistics leaders ==
Statistics leaders correct at the end of the preliminary round.

Best Scorers
Rank	Name	Points
1	(Russia) Marina Tushova	251
2	(United States) Olouma Okaro	203
3	(United States) Katherine Bell	200
4	(Venezuela) María José Pérez	195
5	(Russia) Elena Samoilenko	183

Best Spikers
Rank	Name	%Suc
1	(United States) Oluoma Okaro	40.22
2	(Cuba) Wilma Salas	38.16
3	(Russia) Marina Tushova	38.15
4	(United States) Katherine Bell	36.99
5	(Philippines) Trisha Gayle Tubu	36.40

Best Blockers
Rank	Name	Avg
1	(United States) Meegan Hart	0.79
2	(Philippines) Mary Joy Baron	0.68
3	(Philippines) Jacqueline Acuña	0.60
4	(Philippines) Maria Lourdes Clemente	0.56
5	(Philippines) Isabel Beatriz De Leon	0.55

Best Servers
Rank	Name	Avg
1	(Philippines) Brooke Van Sickle	0.53
2	(Philippines) Gel Cayuna	0.40
3	(Philippines) Janel Maraguinot	0.31
4	(Philippines) Michelle Monique Cobb	0.30
5	(Venezuela) María José Pérez	0.30

Best Diggers
Rank	Name	Avg
1	(Philippines) Toni Rose Ponce	4.50
2	(Philippines) Janel Delerio	4.39
3	(Philippines) Kathleen Faith Arado	4.32
4	(Philippines) Alyssa Eroa	4.09
5	(Philippines) Bernadeth Pons	3.23

Best Setters
Rank	Name	Avg
1	(Philippines) Kyle Negrito	4.90
2	(Philippines) Gel Cayuna	4.77
3	(Philippines) Louie Romero	4.36
4	(Philippines) Kim Fajardo	4.06
5	(Philippines) Iris Janelle Tolenada	4.00

Best Receivers
Rank	Name	%Eff
1	(Philippines) Alyssa Eroa	47.83
2	(Philippines) Bernadeth Pons	46.48
3	(Thailand) Sutadta Chuewulim	45.26
4	(Cuba) Wilma Salas	41.54
5	(Philippines) Brooke Van Sickle	41.45

== PVLPC player of the week ==
Week	Player	Team	Ref.
July 16–20	(Russia) Elena Samoilenko	PLDT High Speed Hitters	
July 23–27	(United States) Oluoma Okaro	Akari Chargers	
July 30–August 3	(Russia) Marina Tushova	Capital1 Solar Spikers	
August 6–10	(Russia) Marina Tushova	Capital1 Solar Spikers	
August 13–17	(Cuba) Wilma Salas	Petro Gazz Angels	
August 20–24	(Russia) Marina Tushova	Capital1 Solar Spikers	
