= Cignal HD Spikers (women) =

Professional women's volleyball team in the Philippines

- Short name: Cignal
- Nickname: Spikers
- Founded: July 7, 2013; 13 years ago
- Dissolved: April 28, 2026; 5 months ago
- History: Cignal HD Spikers; 2014–2025; Cignal Super Spikers; 2025–2026
- League: Philippine Super Liga (2013–2020); Premier Volleyball League (2021–2026)
- Championships: PSL: 1; 2017 Invitational

Uniforms
Home	Away

The Cignal HD Spikers were a women's professional volleyball team in the Philippines owned by Cignal. The team originated from the Philippine Super Liga (PSL) where they have played from 2013 to 2020, before moving to the Premier Volleyball League (PVL) in 2021.

The team rebranded to the Cignal Super Spikers in late 2025. On April 28, 2026, the team announced a leave of absence from the PVL, following a similar move by the men's team earlier that year from the Spikers' Turf.

Cignal was the sister team to the PLDT High Speed Hitters, and formerly its 2013–2018 predecessor as well as the Smart–Maynilad Net Spikers, all of which are under the MVP Group umbrella.

== History ==
=== 2013–2016: Early years ===
The team was established in 2013 as the Cignal HD Spikers. They competed in the Philippine Super Liga (PSL) as one of the league's founding teams. They went on to appear in the finals of their first two conferences, the 2013 Invitational Conference and Grand Prix, but lost to the Philippine Army Lady Troopers on both occasions. In the Invitational, Venus Bernal won the inaugural PSL Most Valuable Player award. For the next three years, Cignal went through a series of underwhelming performances, not winning a single podium.

=== 2017–2020: Later years in the PSL ===
The team saw more success during their later years in the PSL. In the 2017 Invitational Cup, with the likes of Jovelyn Gonzaga, Rachel Daquis, and Chie Saet, the HD Spikers finished as runners-up in the final round, but were declared co-champions of the conference. It is the team's first and only title in its history. The team then reached the podium four more times through 2019. In the 2019 All-Filipino Conference, Cignal upset the first seed Petron Blaze Spikers in two matches, advancing them to the finals series for the first time since 2013. They were swept by the F2 Logistics Cargo Movers in the best-of-three series. Throughout their PSL tenure, Cignal accrued one title, three runner-up finishes, and four bronze-medal finishes for a total of eight podiums.

=== 2021–2024: Move to the PVL ===
On February 4, 2021, the HD Spikers and its sister team, the PLDT Home Fibr Hitters, moved to the Premier Volleyball League, which had turned professional in November 2020. The move coincided with Cignal TV acquiring the broadcast rights to the PVL. After finishing 10th in their first PVL conference, the 2021 Open Conference, the HD Spikers rebuilt with the acquisitions of Frances Molina and Ria Meneses from the Petro Gazz Angels, and Gel Cayuna from the Perlas Spikers. Alongside the later addition of Jackie Acuña, the team consistently finished in the podium from 2022 to 2024, doing so in seven out of the nine conferences held in that timespan. This included two finals appearances, the first came in the 2022 Reinforced Conference against Petro Gazz where they were swept in two matches. The second came against the Grand Slam-seeking Creamline Cool Smashers in the 2024 Invitational Conference. Cignal led 2–1 in the lone championship match, but lost the next two sets, falling short of their first solo title and stopping Creamline's feat.

=== 2024–2026: Rebuild and leave of absence ===
The Cignal Super Spikers logo used from 2025 to 2026

After the 2024 Invitational, the team began to rebuild its roster with new acquisitions and key players transferring to other teams in the coming conferences. During the rebuild, Cignal didn't finish in the podium throughout 2025. The rebuild also presented a time of change for the franchise. The team renamed for the first time, going by the Cignal Super Spikers since October 9, 2025. Additionally, their men's team announced on January 30, 2026 that they would be taking a leave of absence from Spikers' Turf. They finished as runners-up.

Throughout the rebuild, the team was led by a young core. Ishie Lalongisip won the Rookie of the Conference in the 2024–25 All-Filipino and Erika Santos (acquired by Cignal in 2025) won Most Valuable Player in the 2025 PVL on Tour. The end of the rebuild saw Vanie Gandler step up in the 2026 All-Filipino Conference, leading the team to their first podium and first finals appearance in over a year, eventually winning MVP honors. However, it wasn't enough to withstand their late rivals in Creamline, who swept the Super Spikers in the finals.

On April 28, 2026, the Super Spikers women's team took a leave of absence from club volleyball after thirteen years of operation and six years in the PVL. The team's statement mentions that the decision came following a "careful review of Cignal's strategic direction", a similar reason for the men's team's LOA. At the time of their leave, Cignal finished as runners-up three times and as bronze medalists five times. All in all, the team finished a total of sixteen podium finished across both the PSL and PVL.

== Season-by-season records ==
=== Domestic league ===
List of the last five conferences completed by the Cignal women's volleyball team. For the full-season history, see List of Cignal Super Spikers (women) seasons.

Season	Conference	Preliminary round	Final round	Ranking	Source
2024–25 (team)	All-Filipino	3rd (8–3, 25 pts)	Did not qualify (Note: Cignal lost in the qualifying round vs. Capital1 and placed 3rd in the play-in tournament.)	9th place	
2025–26 (team)	PVL on Tour	1st (4–1, 12 pts) (Pool B)	Lost in semifinals vs. Chery Tiggo, 1–3*; Lost in third place match vs. Creamline, 0–3*	4th place	
2025–26 (team)	Invitational	5th (1–4, 4 pts)	Did not qualify	5th place	
2025–26 (team)	Reinforced	6th (5–3, 13 pts)	Lost in quarterfinals vs. PLDT 1–3*	7th place	
2025–26 (team)	All-Filipino	2nd (6–3, 20 pts)	Won in qualifying vs. Creamline, 3–2*; Finished 1st in semifinals (2–1, 6 pts); Lost in championship vs. Creamline, 0–2	Runner-up	
An asterisk (*) indicates single match

=== PNVF Champions League ===
Season	Preliminary round	Final round	Ranking	Source
2024	1st (4–0, 11 pts)	Lost in championship vs. Petro Gazz, 0–3	Runner-up	

=== PSL Beach Volleyball Challenge Cup ===
Season	Preliminary round	Playoffs	Ranking	Source
2015 (Team A)	4th (1–2, 3 pts) (Pool D)	Did not qualify	13th place	
2015 (Team B)	1st (2–0, 6 pts) (Pool B)	Lost in semifinals vs. Giligan's, 1–2; Won in third place match vs. Foton Hurricanes, 2–0	3rd place	
2016 (Note: The team was known as Cignal Team Awesome for the 2016 Beach Volleyball Challenge Cup.)	4th (0–3, 0 pts) (Pool D)	Did not qualify	13th place	
2017 (Team A)	1st (2–0, 6 pts) (Pool A)	Lost in quarterfinals vs. Sta. Lucia, 1–2; Won in fifth place match vs. Cignal (B), 2–1	5th place	
2017 (Team B)	2nd (1–1, 3 pts) (Pool C)	Lost in quarterfinals vs. Petron Sprint 4T, 0–2; Lost in fifth place match vs. Cignal (A), 1–2	6th place	
2018 (Team A)	2nd (1–1, 3 pts) (Pool B)	Lost in quarterfinals vs. F2 Logistics, 1–2; Lost in fifth place match vs. Foton, 1–2	6th place	
2018 (Team B)	2nd (1–1, 3 pts) (Pool C)	Lost in quarterfinals vs. Sta. Lucia (A), 0–2; Lost in seventh place match vs. Sta. Lucia (B), 0–2	8th place	
2019 (Team A)	2nd (1–1, 3 pts) (Pool D)	Lost in quarterfinals vs. Petron XCS, 0–2; Lost in seventh place match vs. F2 Logistics, 0–2	8th place	
2019 (Team B)	3rd (1–2, 4 pts) (Pool B)	Did not qualify	10th place	

== Individual awards ==
=== Premier Volleyball League ===
Season	Conference	Award	Name	Source
2022	Open	1st Best Outside Spiker	(Philippines) Frances Molina	
2022	Open	1st Best Middle Blocker	(Philippines) Roselyn Doria	
2022	Open	2nd Best Middle Blocker	(Philippines) Ria Meneses	
2022	Open	Best Setter	(Philippines) Gel Cayuna	
2022	Invitational	2nd Best Outside Spiker	(Philippines) Frances Molina	
2022	Reinforced	2nd Best Middle Blocker	(Philippines) Roselyn Doria	
2023	Invitational	Most Valuable Player (Conference)	(Philippines) Frances Molina	
2023	Invitational	Best Setter	(Philippines) Gel Cayuna	
2023	2nd All-Filipino	2nd Best Middle Blocker	(Philippines) Ria Meneses	
2023	2nd All-Filipino	Best Setter	(Philippines) Gel Cayuna	
2024–25	Reinforced	Best Setter	(Philippines) Gel Cayuna	
2024–25	Reinforced	Best Foreign Guest Player	(Venezuela) María José Pérez	
2024–25	Invitational	1st Best Middle Blocker	(Philippines) Jackie Acuña	
2024–25	Invitational	1st Best Outside Spiker	(Venezuela) María José Pérez	
2024–25	2024–25 All-Filipino	Rookie of the Conference	(Philippines) Ishie Lalongisip	
2025–26	PVL on Tour	Most Valuable Player (Conference)	(Philippines) Erika Santos	
2025–26	All-Filipino	Most Valuable Player (Conference)	(Philippines) Vanie Gandler	
2025–26	All-Filipino	Best Setter	(Philippines) Gel Cayuna	

=== Philippine Super Liga ===
Philippine SuperLiga

Most Valuable Player	Coach of the Year	Best Libero
(Philippines) Venus Bernal - 2013 Invitational; (Philippines) Jovelyn Gonzaga - 2017 Invitational		(Philippines) Jennylyn Reyes - 2013 Invitational; (Philippines) Angelique Dionela - 2017 Invitational, 2017 All-Filipino, 2019 All-Filipino
1st Best Setter	2nd Best Setter	1st Best Middle Blocker
(Philippines) Arriane Argarin - 2013 Invitational; (Philippines) Relea Ferina Saet - 2017 Invitational; (United States) Alohi Robins-Hardy - 2019 All-Filipino		(Philippines) Honey Royse Tubino - 2013 Invitational; (Philippines) Maureen Penetrante-Ouano - 2013 Grand Prix
2nd Best Middle Blocker	1st Best Opposite Spiker	2nd Best Opposite Spiker
(Philippines) Maica Morada - 2017 Invitational; (Philippines) Roselyn Doria - 2019 Invitational	(United States) Erika Wilson - 2019 Grand Prix	
1st Best Outside Spiker	2nd Best Outside Spiker	
(China) Zhanzhan Li - 2013 Grand Prix; (United States) Lindsay Stalzer - 2014 Grand Prix; (United States) Ariel Elizabeth Usher - 2015 Grand Prix; (Philippines) Rachel Daquis - 2018 Invitational, 2018 All-Filipino, 2019 All-Filipino	(Philippines) Rachel Daquis - 2017 Invitational	

=== PNVF Champions League ===
Season	Conference	Award	Name	Source
2024	PNVF Champions League for Women	Best Setter	(Philippines) Gel Cayuna	
2024	PNVF Champions League for Women	Best Libero	(Philippines) Dawn Macandili-Catindig	

== Team captains ==
- (Philippines) Venus Bernal (2013)
- (Philippines) Michelle Datuin (2013–2014)
- (Philippines) Royse Tubino (2014)
- (Philippines) Charisse Ancheta (2015)
- (Philippines) Michelle Laborte (2015–2016)
- (Philippines) Stephanie Mercado (2017)
- (Philippines) Rachel Daquis (2018–2023)
- (Philippines) Frances Molina (2023–2025)
- (Philippines) Dawn Macandili-Catindig (2025–2026)

== Notable players ==
Philippines

- Judith Abil (2025)
- Geneveve Casugod
- Gel Cayuna (2022–2026)
- Djanel Cheng
- Joy Dacoron (2022)
- Rachel Daquis (2017–2023)
- Vanessa Gandler (2023–2026)
- Jovelyn Gonzaga (2017, 2019, 2023)
- Heather Guino-o (2025–2026)
- Ishie Lalongisip (2024–2026)
- Rizza Mandapat
- Dawn Macandili-Catindig (2023–2026)
- Janine Marciano (2016–2021)
- Ria Meneses (2022–2025)
- Frances Molina (2022–2025)
- Maica Morada (2017)
- Anngela Nunag
- Mylene Paat (2016–2019)
- Jeanette Panaga
- Jennylyn Reyes
- Alohi Robins-Hardy (2019–2020)
- Chie Saet (2017)
- Gyzelle Sy
- Tin Tiamzon
- Royse Tubino (2013–2014, 2017–2018)
- Carmela Tunay (2016)

Foreign players

Australia

- Beth Carey

Azerbaijan

- Anastasiya Artemeva

Bosnia and Herzegovina

- Sonja Milanovic

China

- Zhanzhan Li
- Lei Xie

Cuba

- Liannes Castaneda Simon

Greece

- Eva Chantava

Japan

- Mami Miyashita

Puerto Rico

- Lynda Morales

Slovakia

- Katrin Trebichavska

United States

- Sarah Ammerman
- Amanda Anderson
- Tai Bierria
- Jeane Horton
- Alexis Mathews
- Laura Schaudt
- Lindsay Stalzer
- Ariel Usher
- Erica Wilson

Venezuela

- Maria Jose Perez

== Draft history ==
Season	Pick no.	Name
2014	6	Norie Jane Diaz
2014	6	Michiko Castaneda
2015	3	Rica Enclona
2015	3	Diane Ticar
2016	5	Mary Grace Berte
2016	2	Marlyn Llagoso
2024	7	Ishie Lalongisip
2025	6	Erin Pangilinan
2025	18	Jessa Ordiales

== Imports ==
Season	Number	Player	Country
2013		Zhanzhan Li	China
2013		Lei Xie	China
2014		Lindsay Stalzer	United States
2014		Sarah Ammerman	United States
2015		Ariel Usher	United States
2015		Amanda Anderson	United States
2016		Lynda Morales	Puerto Rico
2016		Laura Schaudt	United States
2017	2	Mami Miyashita	Japan
2017	12	Beth Carey	Australia
2017	18	Alexis Mathews	United States
2018	11	Jeane Horton	United States
2018	20	Sonja Milanović	Bosnia and Herzegovina
2019	9	Anastasiya Artemeva	Azerbaijan
2019	11	Erica Wilson	United States
2020	18	Liannes Castaneda Simon	Cuba
2022	4	Tai Bierria	United States
2024	15	María José Pérez	Venezuela
2025	23	Eva Chantava	Greece
2025	17	Katrin Trebichavská	Slovakia

== Coaches ==
- Sammy Acaylar (2013–2016)
- George Pascua (2017)
- Edgar Barroga (2018–2020)
- Shaq Delos Santos (2021–2026)

== See also ==
- Cignal HD Spikers (men)
