= Gel Cayuna =

Filipino volleyball player (born 1998)

Personal information
- Full name: Maria Angelica Cayuna
- Nationality: Filipino
- Born: August 17, 1998 (age 28); Dapitan, Zamboanga del Norte
- Height: 1.70 m (5 ft 7 in)
- Education: Far Eastern University

Volleyball information
- Position: Setter
- Current club: Nxled Chameleons

National team
2023	Philippines

Maria Angelica "Gel" Cayuna (born August 17, 1998) is a Filipino professional volleyball player who is a setter for the Nxled Chameleons of the Premier Volleyball League (PVL).

Cayuna played for the FEU Lady Tamaraws collegiate women's University team.

== Volleyball career ==
=== UAAP ===
Cayuna played for the FEU Lady Tamaraws collegiate women's University. She made her debut as a Setter of the team in 2016.

In 2019, she became the captain of the FEU Lady Tamaraws.

In 2020, Cayuna made her final year in the UAAP Season 82 volleyball tournaments but eventually, the matches of the tournament were cancelled due to the restrictions of the COVID-19 pandemic.

=== PVL ===
Cayuna also joined United Volleyball Club in the Premier Volleyball League. She also signed with the PayMaya High Flyers in 2018.

In 2021, she made her comeback in the Premier Volleyball League when she was signed by the Perlas Spikers.

In 2022, she was signed by the Cignal HD Spikers.

== Clubs ==
- (Philippines) United Volleyball Club (2016–2017)
- (Philippines) PayMaya High Flyers (2018)
- (Philippines) BanKo Perlas Spikers (2021)
- (Philippines) Cignal HD Spikers (2022–2026)
- (Philippines) Nxled Chameleons (2026–present)

== Awards ==
=== Individual ===
Year	League	Season/Conference	Award	Ref
2022	PVL	Open	Best Setter	
2023	PVL	Invitational	Best Setter	
2023	PVL	2nd All-Filipino	Best Setter	
2024	PNVF	Champions League	Best Setter	
2024	PVL	Reinforced	Best Setter	
2026	PVL	All-Filipino	Best Setter	

=== Collegiate ===
Year	League	Season/Conference	Title	Ref
2015	Shakey's VL	Collegiate	3rd Place	
2016	UAAP	78	3rd Place	
2017	PVL	Collegiate	Runner-up	
2018	UAAP	80	Runner-up	
2018	PVL	Collegiate	Runner-up	

=== Clubs ===
Year	League	Season/Conference	Clubs	Title	Ref
2018	PVL	Reinforced	PayMaya High Flyers	Runner-up	
2022	PVL	Open	Cignal HD Spikers	3rd Place	
2022	PVL	Invitational	Cignal HD Spikers	3rd Place	
2022	PVL	Reinforced	Cignal HD Spikers	Runner-up	
2023	PVL	Invitational	Cignal HD Spikers	3rd Place	
2023	PVL	2nd All-Filipino	Cignal HD Spikers	3rd Place	
2024	PNVF	Champions League	Cignal HD Spikers	Runner-up	
2024	PVL	Reinforced	Cignal HD Spikers	3rd Place	
2024	PVL	Invitational	Cignal HD Spikers	Runner-up	
2026	PVL	All-Filipino	Cignal HD Spikers	Runner-up	
