= Erika Santos =

Filipino volleyball player

Personal information
- Full name: Erika Mae Santos
- Nationality: Filipino
- Born: October 25, 1999 (age 27); Angeles City, Pampanga, Philippines
- Height: 1.72 m (5 ft 8 in)
- Spike: 295 cm (116 in)
- Block: 290 cm (114 in)
- Education: De La Salle University

Volleyball information
- Position: Opposite hitter
- Current team: Capital1 Solar Spikers

Career
Years	Teams
2022–2025	PLDT High Speed Hitters
2025–2026	Cignal Super Spikers
2026–	Capital1 Solar Spikers

Erika Mae Santos (born October 25, 1999) is a Filipino professional volleyball player who plays as an opposite hitter for the Capital1 Solar Spikers of the Premier Volleyball League (PVL).

Santos played for the De La Salle Lady Spikers in college. In July 2022, she entered the pro leagues with the PLDT High Speed Hitters. After three years, she switched to their sister team Cignal HD Spikers in May 2025. In her first conference with Cignal, the 2025 PVL on Tour, she won her first PVL Most Valuable Player award. When Cignal disbanded in 2026, Santos signed with the Capital1 Solar Spikers.

== Early life ==
Erika Mae Santos was born on October 25, 1999, in Angeles City in the Philippines.

== Career ==
=== Collegiate ===
Santos played for the Lady Spikers of the De La Salle University in the University Athletic Association of the Philippines (UAAP).

She played her last playing year in the UAAP in Season 84, where they fell short on getting the championship title against NU Lady Bulldogs. She forgoes her three years of UAAP eligibility left to become a professional player in 2022.

=== Club ===
Santos was signed in by the PLDT High Speed Hitters of the Premier Volleyball League in July 2022. She left in April 2025.

Santos was able to move to the Cignal HD Spikers in May 2025, ahead of the 2025 PVL on Tour. She stayed until the disbandment of the team, later known as the Cignal Super Spikers, after the 2026 All-Filipino Conference.

In May 2026, she transferred to Capital1 Solar Spikers.

== Clubs ==
- (Philippines) PLDT High Speed Hitters (2022–2025)
- (Philippines) Cignal Super Spikers (2025–2026)
- (Philippines) Capital1 Solar Spikers (2026–present)

== Awards ==
=== Individual ===
Year	League	Season	Title	Ref
2025	PVL	on Tour	MVP (Conference)	

=== Collegiate ===
Year	League	Season	Title	Ref
2019	UAAP	81	3rd Place	
2022	UAAP	84	Runner-up	

=== Clubs ===
Year	Season/Conference	Club	Title	Ref
2026	All-Filipino	Cignal Super Spikers	Runner-up	
