= Roselyn Doria =

Filipino volleyball player

Personal information
- Full name: Roselyn Doria
- Nickname: Rose
- Nationality: Filipino
- Born: September 2, 1996 (age 30); Manaoag, Pangasinan, Philippines
- Height: 1.80 m (5 ft 11 in)
- Education: National University

Volleyball information
- Position: Middle Blocker
- Current club: Farm Fresh Foxies
- Number: 11

National team
| 2019 | Philippines |
Honours
Women's volleyball
Representing Philippines
ASEAN Grand Prix
| Bronze medal – third place | 2019 Nakhon Ratchasima | Leg 1 |
| Bronze medal – third place | 2019 Santa Rosa | Leg 2 |

Roselyn Doria (born September 2, 1996) is a Filipino professional volleyball player who is a middle blocker for the Farm Fresh Foxies of the Premier Volleyball League (PVL). She is a member of the Philippines women's national volleyball team that competed in the 2019 ASEAN Grand Prix.

== Clubs ==
- (Philippines) Foton Tornadoes (2017)
- (Philippines) BaliPure - NU Water Defenders (2018)
- (Philippines) Cignal HD Spikers (2019–2026)
- (Philippines) Farm Fresh Foxies (2026–present)

== Awards ==
=== Individual ===
- 2019 UAAP Season 81 "1st Best Middle Blocker"
- 2019 Philippine Superliga Invitational Cup "2nd Best Middle Blocker"
- 2022 Premier Volleyball League Open Conference "1st Best Middle Blocker"
- 2022 Premier Volleyball League Reinforced Conference "2nd Best Middle Blocker"

=== Collegiate ===
- 2014-15 UAAP Season 77 volleyball tournaments - - Bronze medal, with NU Lady Bulldogs
- 2015 Shakey's V-League 12th Season Collegiate Conference - - Champion, with NU Lady Bulldogs
- 2016 Shakey's V-League 13th Season Collegiate Conference - - Champion, with NU Lady Bulldogs
- 2017 Premier Volleyball League 1st Season Collegiate Conference - - Champion, with NU Lady Bulldogs

=== Club ===
- 2019 PSL All-Filipino Conference - - Runner-up, with Cignal HD Spikers
- 2019 PSL Invitational Cup - - Bronze medal, with Cignal HD Spikers
- 2022 PVL Open Conference - - Bronze medal, with Cignal HD Spikers
- 2022 PVL Invitational Conference - - Bronze medal, with Cignal HD Spikers
- 2022 PVL Reinforced Conference - - Runner-up, with Cignal HD Spikers
- 2023 PVL Invitational Conference - - Bronze medal, with Cignal HD Spikers
- 2023 PVL Second All-Filipino Conference - - Bronze medal, with Cignal HD Spikers
- 2024 PNVF Champions League for Women - - Runner-up, with Cignal HD Spikers
- 2024 PVL Reinforced Conference - - Bronze, with Cignal HD Spikers

=== National team ===
- (Thailand) 2019 ASEAN Grand Prix - First Leg - - Bronze medal
- (Philippines) 2019 ASEAN Grand Prix - Second Leg - - Bronze medal
