= 2022 Premier Volleyball League Reinforced Conference =

Third conference of the 2022 PVL season

- Duration: October 8 – December 6, 2022
- Teams: 9
- Matches: 46
- Attendance: 168,821 (3,670 per match)
- TV partner(s): One Sports; One Sports+

Results
- Champions: Petro Gazz Angels
- Runners-up: Cignal HD Spikers
- Third place: Creamline Cool Smashers
- Fourth place: Chery Tiggo Crossovers

Awards
- Conference MVP: Mylene Paat
- Finals MVP: Lindsey Vander Weide
- Best OH: Alyssa Valdez; Myla Pablo
- Best MB: MJ Phillips; Roselyn Doria
- Best OPP: Mylene Paat
- Best Setter: Jia de Guzman
- Best Libero: Ria Beatriz Duremdes

PVL Reinforced Conference chronology
- < 2019 2024 >

PVL conference chronology
- < 2022 Invitational 2023 First All-Filipino >

The 2022 Premier Volleyball League Reinforced Conference was the thirteenth conference of the Premier Volleyball League, its fourth conference as a professional league, and the third and final conference of the 2022 season.

The tournament began on October 8 and finished on December 6, 2022. This was the first reinforced conference in three years; the last was in 2019. It was also the first conference to use a video challenge system. It featured nine local teams with one foreign guest player each. Among these were the returning F2 Logistics Cargo Movers and the debuting team Akari Chargers.

== Participating teams ==
2022 Premier Volleyball League Reinforced Conference
Abbr.	Team	Affiliation	Head coach	Foreign guest player	Team captain
AKA	Akari Chargers	Akari Lighting & Technology Corporation	(Brazil) Jorge Edson	(Dominican Republic) Prisilla Rivera	(Philippines) Michelle Cobb
CTC	Chery Tiggo Crossovers	United Asia Automotive Group, Inc.	(Philippines) Clarence Esteban	(Montenegro) Jelena Cvijović	(Philippines) Mylene Paat
CMF	Choco Mucho Flying Titans	Republic Biscuit Corporation	(Philippines) Edjet Mabbayad	(Azerbaijan) Odina Aliyeva	(Philippines) Bea de Leon
CHD	Cignal HD Spikers	Cignal TV, Inc.	(Philippines) Shaq Delos Santos	(United States) Tai Bierria	(Philippines) Rachel Daquis
CCS	Creamline Cool Smashers	Republic Biscuit Corporation	(Philippines) Sherwin Meneses	(Turkey) Yeliz Başa	(Philippines) Alyssa Valdez
FTL	F2 Logistics Cargo Movers	F2 Logistics Philippines	(Philippines) Benson Bocboc	(United States) Lindsay Stalzer	(United States) Lindsay Stalzer
PGA	Petro Gazz Angels	PetroGazz Ventures Phils. Corp.	(Philippines) Rald Ricafort	(United States) Lindsey Vander Weide	(Philippines) Chie Saet
PLD	PLDT High Speed Hitters	PLDT Inc.	(Philippines) George Pascua	(Russia) Elena Savkina-Samoilenko	(Philippines) Rhea Dimaculangan
UAA	United Auctioneers Army Lady Troopers	Philippine Army / United Auctioneers Inc.	(Philippines) Kungfu Reyes	(Canada) Laura Condotta	(Philippines) Jovelyn Gonzaga

== Venues ==
Preliminaries
Santa Rosa City	San Juan City	Pasay City
Santa Rosa Sports Complex	Filoil EcoOil Centre	SM Mall of Asia Arena
Capacity: 5,700	Capacity: 6,000	Capacity: 15,000
Preliminaries, semifinals, finals
Quezon City	Pasig City	
Araneta Coliseum	PhilSports Arena	
Capacity: 20,000	Capacity: 10,000	

== Transactions ==
=== National team players ===
The following players who played in the 2022 Asian Women's Volleyball Cup and the 2022 ASEAN Grand Prix are solely players from Creamline Cool Smashers.

Team	Outside hitters	Middle blockers	Opposite spikers	Setters	Liberos
Creamline Cool Smashers	Fille Cainglet-Cayetano	Lorie Lyn Bernardo	Tots Carlos	Jia De Guzman	Kyla Atienza
Creamline Cool Smashers	Jema Galanza	Celine Domingo	Michele Gumabao	Kyle Negrito	Ella de Jesus
Creamline Cool Smashers	Rosemarie Vargas	Jeanette Panaga	Rizza Jane Mandapat	—N/a	—N/a
Creamline Cool Smashers	—N/a	Risa Sato	—N/a	—N/a	—N/a
Creamline Cool Smashers	—N/a	Pau Soriano	—N/a	—N/a	—N/a

=== Team additions and transfers ===
The following are the players who transferred to another team for the upcoming conference.

Player	Moving from (last team)	Moving to
Krich Macaslang	Adamson Lady Falcons (UAAP)	Akari Chargers
Trisha Genesis	Adamson Lady Falcons (UAAP)	Akari Chargers
Danielle Theris Ravena	Ateneo Blue Eagles (UAAP)	Akari Chargers
Erika Raagas	Ateneo Blue Eagles(UAAP)	Akari Chargers
Janel Maraguinot	Ateneo Blue Eagles(UAAP)	Akari Chargers
Geneveve Casugod	BaliPure Purest Water Defenders	Akari Chargers
Gyra Ezra Barroga	BaliPure Purest Water Defenders	Akari Chargers
Jamie Isabelle Lavitoria	BaliPure Purest Water Defenders	Akari Chargers
Janine Marciano	BaliPure Purest Water Defenders	Akari Chargers
Jhoana Louisse Maraguinot	BaliPure Purest Water Defenders	Akari Chargers
Michelle Marie Monique Cobb	De La Salle Lady Spikers (UAAP)	Akari Chargers
Lycha Ebon	FEU Lady Tamaraws (UAAP)	Akari Chargers
Princes Ezra Madrigal	FEU Lady Tamaraws (UAAP)	Akari Chargers
Chiara May Permentilla	Marinerang Pilipina Lady Skippers (PSL)	Akari Chargers
Bingle Landicho	NU Lady Bulldogs (UAAP)	Akari Chargers
Andrea Marzan	Sta. Lucia Lady Realtors	Akari Chargers
Jaila Atienza	UP Fighting Maroons (UAAP)	Chery Tiggo Crossovers
Jaycel delos Reyes	Ateneo Blue Eagles(UAAP)	Chery Tiggo Crossovers
Roselle Baliton	BaliPure Purest Water Defenders	Chery Tiggo Crossovers
Pia Sarmiento	Lyceum Lady Pirates (NCAA)	Chery Tiggo Crossovers
France Elize Ronquillo	NU Lady Bulldogs (UAAP)	Chery Tiggo Crossovers
Rachelle Roldan	UST Golden Tigresses(UAAP)	Chery Tiggo Crossovers
Maika Ortiz	Chery Tiggo Crossovers	Choco Mucho Flying Titans
Arianne Mae Layug	Chery Tiggo Crossovers	Cignal HD Spikers
Mary Joy Dacoron	Chery Tiggo Crossovers	Cignal HD Spikers
Elaine Kasilag	Chery Tiggo Crossovers	F2 Logistics Cargo Movers
Ivy Lacsina	NU Lady Bulldogs (UAAP)	F2 Logistics Cargo Movers
Kalei Mau	Athletes Unlimited Volleyball (United States)	F2 Logistics Cargo Movers
Rachel Austero	Chery Tiggo Crossovers	PLDT High Speed Hitters

=== Foreign guest players ===
The following are the foreign guest players acquired by each team.

Team	Foreign player	Moving from
Akari Chargers	(Dominican Republic) Prisilla Rivera	(Indonesia) Jakarta Pertamina Energi
Chery Tiggo Crossovers	(Montenegro) Jelena Cvijović	(Romania) SCM U Craiova
Choco Mucho Flying Titans	(Azerbaijan) Odina Aliyeva	(Indonesia) VW Jakarta Elektrik PLN
Cignal HD Spikers	(United States) Tai Bierria	(France) Clamart Volley-Ball
Creamline Cool Smashers	(Turkey) Yeliz Başa	(Italy) Anthea Vicenza
F2 Logistics Cargo Movers	(United States) Lindsay Stalzer	(Puerto Rico) Atenienses de Manati
Petro Gazz Angels	(United States) Lindsey Vander Weide	(Greece) AEK Athens
PLDT High Speed Hitters	(Russia) Elena Savkina-Samoilenko	(Turkey) Mersin B.Şehir Bld.
United Auctioneers Army Lady Troopers	(Canada) Laura Condotta	(Cyprus) AEK Larnaca

=== Coaching changes ===
Team	Outgoing coach	Manner of departure	Replaced by	Ref
Choco Mucho Flying Titans	(Philippines) Oliver Almadro	Resigned midway through the conference	(Philippines) Edjet Mabbayad	
Petro Gazz Angels	(Philippines) Arnold Laniog	Reassigned	(Philippines) Rald Ricafort	

== Format ==
This conference implemented a single round-robin in pthe reliminary and semifinals, and a best-of-three series in the 3rd place match and Championship match. The following format was conducted for the entirety of the conference:

Preliminary round

1. The nine teams play in a single round-robin elimination.
2. Teams are ranked using the FIVB ranking system.
3. Top four teams advance to the semifinals.

Semifinals

1. The four teams play again in a single round-robin elimination.
2. Teams are ranked using the FIVB Ranking System.
3. The 3rd and 4th ranked teams advanced to the bronze medal match.
4. The 1st and 2nd ranked teams advanced to the gold medal match.

Finals

1. Bronze medal: SF Rank 3 vs SF Rank 4 (best-of-three series)
2. Gold medal: SF Rank 1 vs SF Rank 2 (best-of-three series)

== Pool standing procedure ==
- First, teams are ranked by the number of matches won.
- If the number of matches won is tied, the tied teams are then ranked by match points, wherein:
  - Match won 3–0 or 3–1: 3 match points for the winner, 0 match points for the loser.
  - Match won 3–2: 2 match points for the winner, 1 match point for the loser.
- In case of any further ties, the following criteria shall be used:
  - Set ratio: the number of sets won divided by number of sets lost.
  - Point ratio: number of points scored divided by number of points allowed.
  - Head-to-head standings: any remaining tied teams are ranked based on the results of head-to-head matches involving the teams in question.

== Preliminary round ==
- All times are Philippine Standard Time (UTC+8:00).

=== Ranking ===
Pos	Team	Pld	W	L	Pts	SW	SL	SR	SPW	SPL	SPR	Qualification
1	Creamline Cool Smashers	8	7	1	22	23	10	2.300	782	700	1.117	Semifinals
2	Chery Tiggo Crossovers	8	6	2	16	21	14	1.500	764	764	1.000	Semifinals
3	Petro Gazz Angels	8	5	3	15	18	12	1.500	703	617	1.139	Semifinals
4	Cignal HD Spikers	8	5	3	14	18	14	1.286	718	708	1.014	Semifinals
5	F2 Logistics Cargo Movers	8	4	4	11	15	14	1.071	742	709	1.047	
6	PLDT High Speed Hitters	8	3	5	10	15	18	0.833	742	715	1.038	
7	Choco Mucho Flying Titans	8	3	5	9	14	18	0.778	717	723	0.992	
8	Akari Chargers	8	3	5	9	13	18	0.722	637	710	0.897	
9	United Auctioneers Army Lady Troopers	8	0	8	2	5	24	0.208	545	692	0.788	

=== Match results ===
Date	Time	Venue		Score		Set 1	Set 2	Set 3	Set 4	Set 5	Total	Report
08 Oct	14:30	SRSC	PLDT High Speed Hitters	3–2	United Auctioneers Army Lady Troopers	17–25	25–20	24–26	25–11	15–11	106–93	P2
08 Oct	17:30	SRSC	Akari Power Chargers	1–3	Cignal HD Spikers	25–20	23–25	18–25	16–25		82–95	P2
11 Oct	14:30	PSA	F2 Logistics Cargo Movers	0–3	Chery Tiggo Crossovers	23–25	21–25	22–25			66–75	P2
11 Oct	17:30	PSA	Petro Gazz Angels	3–0	Choco Mucho Flying Titans	27–25	25–22	28–26			80–73	P2
13 Oct	14:30	PSA	PLDT High Speed Hitters	1–3	Creamline Cool Smashers	22–25	18–25	28–26	22–25		90–101	P2
13 Oct	17:30	PSA	F2 Logistics Cargo Movers	1–3	Choco Mucho Flying Titans	21–25	25–22	20–25	24–26		90–98	P2
15 Oct	14:30	PSA	Akari Power Chargers	3–0	United Auctioneers Army Lady Troopers	25–20	25–22	25–22			75–64	P2
15 Oct	17:30	PSA	Cignal HD Spikers	1–3	Chery Tiggo Crossovers	23–25	25–20	21–25	20–25		89–95	P2
18 Oct	14:30	PSA	United Auctioneers Army Lady Troopers	0–3	F2 Logistics Cargo Movers	17–25	21–25	16–25			54–75	P2
18 Oct	17:30	PSA	Creamline Cool Smashers	3–1	Petro Gazz Angels	25–19	16–25	25–18	27–25		93–87	P2
20 Oct	14:30	PSA	Chery Tiggo Crossovers	3–2	Akari Power Chargers	23–25	25–21	21–25	25–21	15–6	109–98	P2
20 Oct	17:30	PSA	Choco Mucho Flying Titans	3–2	PLDT High Speed Hitters	25–27	25–22	18–25	25–22	17–15	110–111	P2
22 Oct	14:30	SRSC	Petro Gazz Angels	3–0	Akari Power Chargers	25–13	25–14	25–20			75–47	P2
22 Oct	17:30	SRSC	Creamline Cool Smashers	3–1	Cignal HD Spikers	25–18	22–25	25–22	25–12		97–77	P2
25 Oct	14:30	PSA	Choco Mucho Flying Titans	1–3	Chery Tiggo Crossovers	27–29	25–18	16–25	20–25		88–97	P2
25 Oct	17:30	PSA	PLDT High Speed Hitters	0–3	F2 Logistics Cargo Movers	19–25	22–25	20–25			61–75	P2
27 Oct	14:30	PSA	Akari Power Chargers	1–3	Creamline Cool Smashers	25–23	15–25	16–25	21–25		77–98	P2
27 Oct	17:30	PSA	Chery Tiggo Crossovers	3–2	United Auctioneers Army Lady Troopers	22–25	25–18	25–27	25–18	15–12	112–100	P2
03 Nov	14:30	FEC	United Auctioneers Army Lady Troopers	0–3	Cignal HD Spikers	23–25	19–25	19–25			61–75	P2
03 Nov	17:30	FEC	Choco Mucho Flying Titans	2–3	Akari Power Chargers	25–23	21–25	19–25	25–21	12–15	102–109	P2
05 Nov	14:30	SRSC	Petro Gazz Angels	3–1	PLDT High Speed Hitters	19–25	25–21	25–20	27–25		96–91	P2
05 Nov	17:30	SRSC	Chery Tiggo Crossovers	1–3	Creamline Cool Smashers	23–25	25–20	12–25	30–32		90–102	P2
08 Nov	14:30	SAC	United Auctioneers Army Lady Troopers	0–3	Choco Mucho Flying Titans	24–26	10–25	17–25			51–76	P2
08 Nov	17:30	SAC	Creamline Cool Smashers	2–3	F2 Logistics Cargo Movers	25–22	25–23	20–25	19–25	11–15	100–110	P2
10 Nov	14:30	SAC	Cignal HD Spikers	3–2	Petro Gazz Angels	25–22	34–32	15–25	16–25	15–13	105–117	P2
10 Nov	17:30	SAC	Akari Power Chargers	0–3	PLDT High Speed Hitters	11–25	21–25	19–25			51–75	P2
12 Nov	14:30	SAC	Creamline Cool Smashers	3–1	United Auctioneers Army Lady Troopers	25–12	25–18	23–25	25–23		98–78	P2
12 Nov	17:30	SAC	Petro Gazz Angels	3–2	Chery Tiggo Crossovers	25–14	24–26	25–13	21–25	15–9	110–87	P2
15 Nov	14:30	SAC	PLDT High Speed Hitters	3–1	Cignal HD Spikers	25–21	25–23	22–25	25–21		97–90	P2
15 Nov	17:30	SAC	F2 Logistics Cargo Movers	1–3	Akari Power Chargers	21–25	25–22	24–26	22–25		92–98	P2
17 Nov	14:30	MOA	Chery Tiggo Crossovers	3–2	PLDT High Speed Hitters	25–20	18–25	22–25	25–16	18–16	108–102	P2
17 Nov	17:30	MOA	Choco Mucho Flying Titans	1–3	Creamline Cool Smashers	25–15	20–25	20–25	26–28		91–93	P2
19 Nov	14:30	SAC	United Auctioneers Army Lady Troopers	0–3	Petro Gazz Angels	13–25	12–25	19–25			44–75	P2
19 Nov	17:30	SAC	Cignal HD Spikers	3–1	F2 Logistics Cargo Movers	25–21	20–25	25–14	25–20		95–80	P2
22 Nov	14:30	PSA	Cignal HD Spikers	3–1	Choco Mucho Flying Titans	17–25	25–22	25–18	25–14		92–79	P2
22 Nov	17:30	PSA	F2 Logistics Cargo Movers	3–0	Petro Gazz Angels	25–17	25–22	27–25			77–64	P2

== Final round ==
- All times are Philippine Standard Time (UTC+8:00).

=== Semifinals ===
==== Ranking ====
Pos	Team	Pld	W	L	Pts	SW	SL	SR	SPW	SPL	SPR	Qualification
1	Cignal HD Spikers	3	2	1	6	7	4	1.750	260	258	1.008	Championship series
2	Petro Gazz Angels	3	2	1	6	6	4	1.500	239	201	1.189	Championship series
3	Creamline Cool Smashers	3	2	1	5	7	5	1.400	266	251	1.060	3rd place series
4	Chery Tiggo Crossovers	3	0	3	1	2	9	0.222	197	252	0.782	3rd place series

==== Match results ====
Date	Time	Venue		Score		Set 1	Set 2	Set 3	Set 4	Set 5	Total	Report
24 Nov	14:30	PSA	Petro Gazz Angels	0–3	Creamline Cool Smashers	21–25	20–25	23–25			64–75	P2
24 Nov	17:30	PSA	Cignal HD Spikers	3–0	Chery Tiggo Crossovers	28–26	25–17	25–23			78–66	P2
27 Nov	14:30	SAC	Creamline Cool Smashers	1–3	Cignal HD Spikers	25–23	23–25	26–28	18–25		92–101	P2
27 Nov	17:30	SAC	Chery Tiggo Crossovers	0–3	Petro Gazz Angels	15–25	17–25	13–25			45–75	P2
29 Nov	14:30	PSA	Petro Gazz Angels	3–1	Cignal HD Spikers	25–14	25–21	25–27	25–19		100–81	P2
29 Nov	17:30	PSA	Chery Tiggo Crossovers	2–3	Creamline Cool Smashers	16–25	25–20	25–14	11–25	9–15	86–99	P2

=== Finals ===
==== 3rd place ====
- Creamline wins series, 2–0.

Date	Time	Venue		Score		Set 1	Set 2	Set 3	Set 4	Set 5	Total	Report
01 Dec	14:30	SAC	Creamline Cool Smashers	3–1	Chery Tiggo Crossovers	25–22	22–25	25–5	25–19		97–71	P2
06 Dec	14:30	PSA	Chery Tiggo Crossovers	1–3	Creamline Cool Smashers	15–25	19–25	25–23	21–25		80–98	P2

==== Championship ====
- Petro Gazz wins series, 2–0.

Date	Time	Venue		Score		Set 1	Set 2	Set 3	Set 4	Set 5	Total	Report
01 Dec	17:30	SAC	Petro Gazz Angels	3–0	Cignal HD Spikers	25–21	27–25	37–35			89–81	P2
06 Dec	17:30	PSA	Cignal HD Spikers	1–3	Petro Gazz Angels	17–25	25–22	12–25	22–25		76–97	P2

== Final standing ==
Rank	Team
1st place, gold medalist(s)	Petro Gazz Angels
2nd place, silver medalist(s)	Cignal HD Spikers
3rd place, bronze medalist(s)	Creamline Cool Smashers
4	Chery Tiggo Crossovers
5	F2 Logistics Cargo Movers
6	PLDT High Speed Hitters
7	Choco Mucho Flying Titans
8	Akari Chargers
9	United Auctioneers Army Lady Troopers

2022 PVL Reinforced champions
Petro Gazz Angels
Second title

Team roster
Bang Pineda, Djanel Cheng, Mariella Gabarda, Grethcel Soltones, Seth Marione Rodriguez, Aiza Maizo-Pontillas, Mary Remy Joy Palma, Marian Alisa Buitre, Myla Pablo, MJ Phillips, Lindsey Vander Weide, Relea Ferina Saet (c), Cienne Mary Arielle Cruz, Nicole Anne Tiamzon, Jonah Sabete
Head coach
Rald Ricafort

== Awards and medalists ==
=== Individual awards ===
Award	Player	Team	Ref.
Conference Most Valuable Player	Mylene Paat	Chery Tiggo	
Finals Most Valuable Player	Lindsey Vander Weide	Petro Gazz	
1st Best Outside Spiker	Alyssa Valdez	Creamline	
2nd Best Outside Spiker	Myla Pablo	Petro Gazz	
1st Best Middle Blocker	MJ Phillips	Petro Gazz	
2nd Best Middle Blocker	Roselyn Doria	Cignal	
Best Opposite Spiker	Mylene Paat	Chery Tiggo	
Best Setter	Jia De Guzman	Creamline	
Best Libero	Ria Beatriz Duremdes	Chery Tiggo	
Best Foreign Guest Player	Lindsey Vander Weide	Petro Gazz	

=== Medalists ===
Gold	Silver	Bronze
Petro Gazz Angels Relea Ferina Saet (c); Bang Pineda (L); Djanel Cheng; Mariella Gabarda; Grethcel Soltones; Seth Marione Rodriguez; Aiza Maizo-Pontillas; Mary Remy Joy Palma; Marian Alisa Buitre; Myla Pablo; MJ Phillips; Lindsey Vander Weide (I); Cienne Mary Arielle Cruz (L); Nicole Anne Tiamzon; Jonah Sabete Head Coach: Rald Ricafort	Cignal HD Spikers Rachel Daquis (c); Glaudine Troncoso; Roselyn Doria; Tai Bierria (I); Maristela Genn Layug; Arianne Mae Layug; Frances Molina; Angeli Pauline Araneta; Fatima Bia General (L); Jacqueline Acuña; Mary Joy Dacoron; Angelique Dionela (L); Klarisa Abriam; Jerilli Malabanan; Marivic Velaine Meneses; Maria Arielle Estrañero; Gel Cayuna Head Coach: Cesael Delos Santos	Creamline Cool Smashers Alyssa Valdez (c); Kyle Negrito; Fille Cainglet-Cayetano; Risa Sato; Michele Gumabao; Jorella Marie De Jesus (L); Pau Soriano; Kyla Atienza (L); Julia Melissa Morado-De Guzman; Celine Domingo; Jeanette Panaga; Rizza Jane Mandapat; Rosemarie Vargas; Lorielyn Bernardo; Yeliz Basa (I); Jessica Margarett Galanza Head Coach: Sherwin Meneses

== Statistics leaders ==
Statistics leaders correct at the end of preliminary round.

Best Scorers
Rank	Name	Points
1	(Russia) Elena Samoilenko	213
2	(Dominican Republic) Prisilla Rivera	206
3	(United States) Lindsey Vander Weide	187
4	(United States) Lindsay Stalzer	161
5	(Philippines) Mylene Paat	160

Best Spikers
Rank	Name	%Eff
1	(Dominican Republic) Prisilla Rivera	39.79
2	(Turkey) Yeliz Başa	38.07
3	(Philippines) Mylene Paat	37.09
4	(United States) Lindsey Vander Weide	36.04
5	(United States) Lindsay Stalzer	35.37

Best Blockers
Rank	Name	Avg
1	(Philippines) Mary Remy Joy Palma	0.77
2	(Philippines) Ivy Keith Lacsina	0.69
3	(Philippines) Roselyn Doria	0.69
4	(Philippines) MJ Phillips	0.67
5	(Philippines) Roselle Baliton	0.57

Best Servers
Rank	Name	Avg
1	(Philippines) Gel Cayuna	0.41
2	(United States) Lindsey Vander Weide	0.37
3	(Philippines) Kim Fajardo	0.31
4	(Philippines) Desiree Wynea Cheng	0.31
5	(Philippines) Mika Aereen Reyes	0.30

Best Diggers
Rank	Name	Avg
1	(Philippines) Anngela Nunag	3.66
2	(Philippines) Kyla Atienza	3.61
3	(Philippines) Ria Beatriz Duremdes	3.46
4	(Philippines) Alyssa Valdez	3.18
5	(Philippines) Dennise Lazaro-Revilla	3.13

Best Setters
Rank	Name	Avg
1	(Philippines) Julia Melissa De Guzman	5.82
2	(Philippines) Djanel Cheng	4.23
3	(Philippines) Kim Fajardo	4.07
4	(Philippines) Gel Cayuna	3.78
5	(Philippines) Rhea Dimaculangan	3.52

Best Receivers
Rank	Name	%Succ
1	(Philippines) Kathleen Faith Arado	56.11
2	(Philippines) Jessica Galanza	50.00
3	(Azerbaijan) Odina Aliyeva	45.67
4	(Philippines) Anngela Nunag	45.06
5	(Philippines) Ria Beatriz Duremdes	39.23
