= Premier Volleyball League Mythical Team and All-Premier Team =

Premier Volleyball League award

The Premier Volleyball League Mythical Team and All-Premier Team are two groups of seven Premier Volleyball League positional awards given out each season and conference, respectively. Both groups include two awards each for Best Outside Hitters and Best Middle Blockers, and one award each for Best Opposite Hitter, Best Setter, and Best Libero. The All-Premier Team was first introduced during the league's establishment while the Mythical Team was introduced in 2025 and is selected by the PVL Press Corps.

Three players have been selected to the Mythical Team at least twice: Majoy Baron, Gel Cayuna, and Trisha Tubu. In the All-Premier Team, Jeanette Panaga is the only player to have ten selections, thus also making her the player with the most All-Premier Team selections. She is followed by Alyssa Valdez and Jia Morado-de Guzman, who have nine and eight selections, respectively.

== Key ==
^	Denotes player who is still active in the PVL
Player (#)	Denotes the number of times the player has been named to an All-Premier Team or Mythical Team
**Player** **(in bold text)**	Indicates the player who won Most Valuable Player in the same conference or Most Valuable Player of the Season in the same season

== Mythical Team ==
=== Winners ===
Season	Best Outside Hitters		Best Middle Blockers		Best Opposite Hitter	Best Setter	Best Libero	Ref.
2024–25	(Philippines) Bernadeth Pons^ (Creamline)	(Philippines) (United States) **Brooke Van Sickle**^ (Petro Gazz)	(Philippines) Majoy Baron^ (PLDT)	(Philippines) Bea de Leon^ (Creamline)	(Philippines) Trisha Tubu^ (Farm Fresh)	(Philippines) Gel Cayuna^ (Cignal)	(Philippines) Alyssa Eroa^ (Galeries Tower)	
2025–26	(Philippines) Bella Belen^ (Capital1)	(Philippines) (Canada) Savi Davison^ (PLDT)	(Philippines) Majoy Baron^ (2) (PLDT)	(Philippines) Jeanette Panaga^ (Creamline)	(Philippines) **Trisha Tubu**^ (2) (Farm Fresh)	(Philippines) Gel Cayuna^ (2) (Cignal)	(Philippines) Kath Arado^ (PLDT)	

=== Most selections ===
The following table only lists players with at least two total selections.

Player	Pos. (Note: The positions listed reflect which ones the player earned a selection for, with the most-awarded position listed first.)	Total
(Philippines) Majoy Baron	MB	**2**
(Philippines) Gel Cayuna	S	**2**
(Philippines) Trisha Tubu	OP	**2**

== All-Premier Team ==
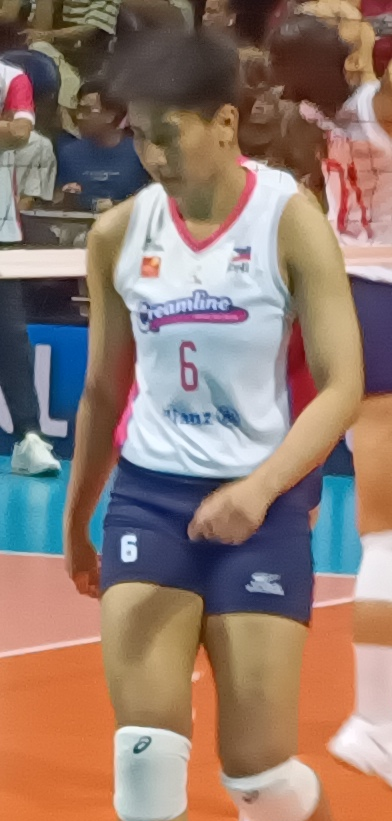
Jeanette Panaga is the first and only player to reach 10 All-Premier Team selections.

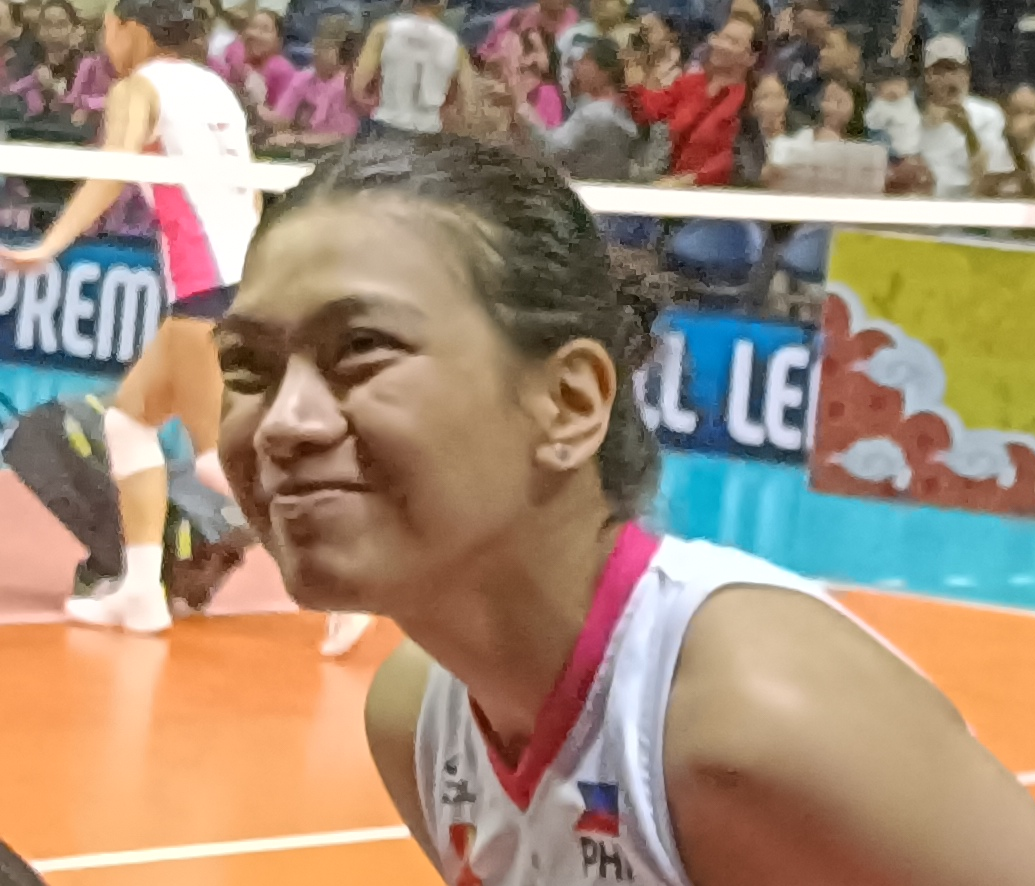
Alyssa Valdez has the second-most selections with nine.

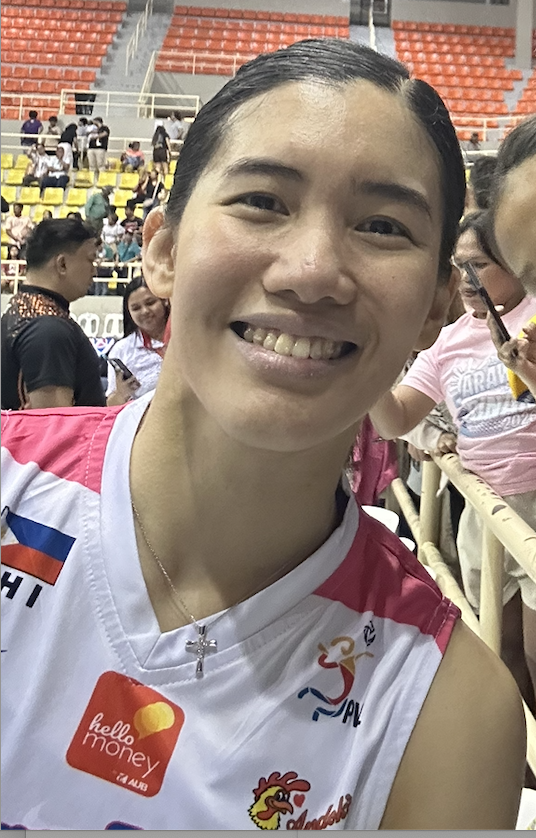
Jia Morado-de Guzman is the first player to reach five selections and has the third-most overall with eight.

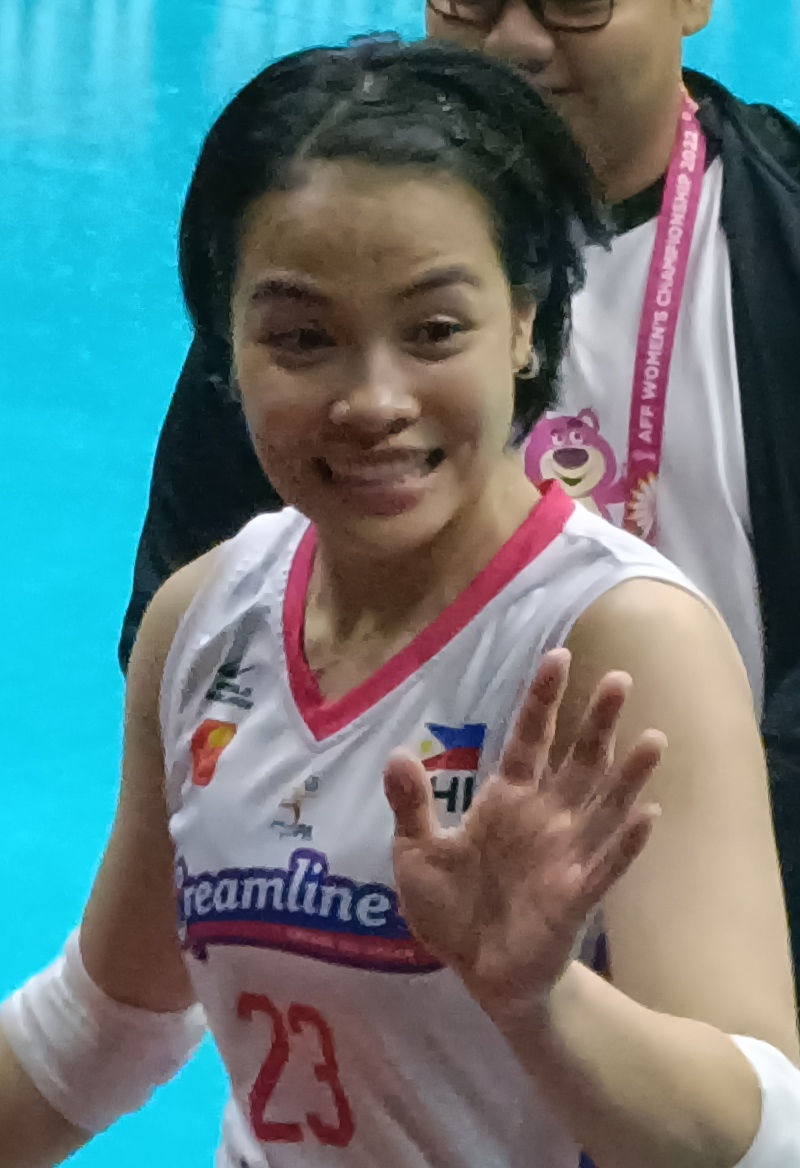
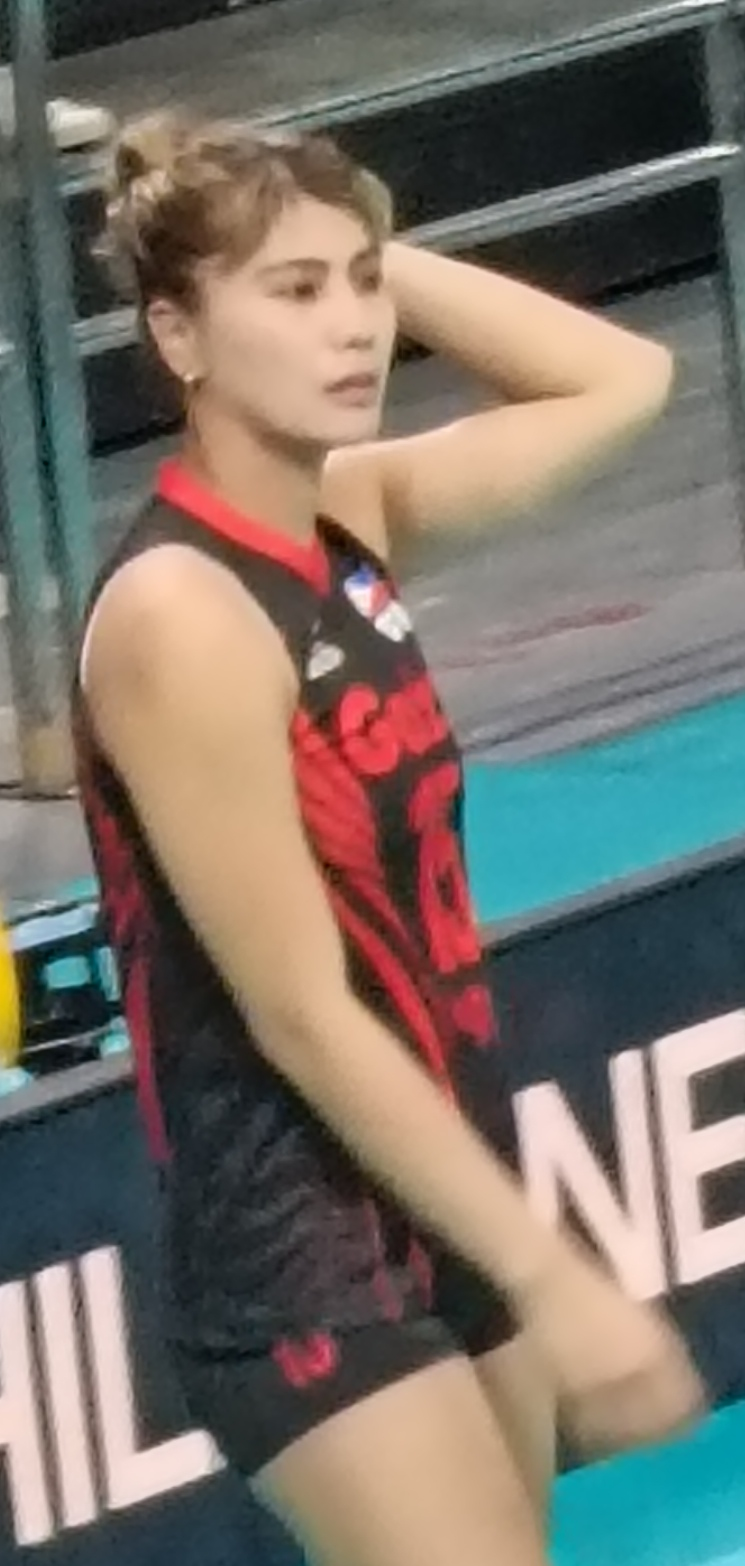
Jema Galanza (top) and Myla Pablo (bottom) are among the players with at least five selections.

=== 2017 to 2023 ===
From 2017 to 2023, the two Best Outside Hitters and two best Middle Blockers were ranked first and second.

Season	Conference	1st Best Outside Hitter	2nd Best Outside Hitter	1st Best Middle Blocker	2nd Best Middle Blocker	Best Opposite Hitter	Best Setter	Best Libero	Ref.
2017	Reinforced	(Philippines) **Alyssa Valdez**^ (Creamline)	(Philippines) Grethcel Soltones^ (BaliPure)	(Philippines) (Japan) Risa Sato^ (BaliPure)	(Philippines) Jeanette Panaga^ (Pocari)	(Philippines) Dimdim Pacres^ (Power Smashers)	(Philippines) Jasmine Nabor^ (BaliPure)	(Philippines) Melissa Gohing (Pocari)	
2017	Open	(Philippines) **Myla Pablo**^ (Pocari)	(Philippines) Grethcel Soltones^ (2) (BaliPure)	(Philippines) Jeanette Panaga^ (2) (Pocari)	(Philippines) (Japan) Risa Sato^ (2) (BaliPure)	(Philippines) Iari Yongco (Air Force)	(Philippines) Jia Morado (Creamline)	(Philippines) Melissa Gohing (2) (Pocari)	
2017	Collegiate	(Philippines) Eli Soyud^ (Adamson)	(Philippines) Regine Arocha^ (Arellano)	(Philippines) Jeanette Villareal^ (FEU)	(Philippines) (Japan) Risa Sato^ (3) (NU)	(Philippines) Toni Basas^ (FEU)	(Philippines) Rhea Ramirez (Arellano)	(Philippines) Gayle Valdez (NU)	
2018	Reinforced	(Philippines) Alyssa Valdez^ (2) (Creamline)	(Philippines) **Myla Pablo**^ (2) (Pocari)	(Philippines) Jeanette Panaga^ (3) (Pocari)	(Philippines) Joy Dacoron^ (Perlas)	(Philippines) Michelle Gumabao^ (Creamline)	(Philippines) Jia Morado (2) (Creamline)	(Philippines) Tatan Pantone (PayMaya)	
2018	Collegiate	(Philippines) **Isa Molde**^ (UP)	(Philippines) Bernadette Flora (Adamson)	(Philippines) Celine Domingo^ (FEU)	(Philippines) Aie Gannaban (UP)	(Philippines) Eli Soyud^ (2) (Adamson)	(Philippines) Mary Jane Igao (Adamson)	(Philippines) Thang Ponce^ (Adamson)	
2018	Open	(Philippines) **Alyssa Valdez**^ (3) (Creamline)	(Philippines) Jema Galanza^ (Creamline)	(Philippines) Maddie Madayag^ (Ateneo)	(Philippines) Kathy Bersola (Perlas)	(Philippines) Kat Tolentino^ (Ateneo)	(Philippines) Jia Morado (3) (Creamline)	(Philippines) Cienne Cruz (Petro Gazz)	
2019	Reinforced	(Philippines) Nicole Tiamzon^ (Perlas)	(Philippines) **Alyssa Valdez**^ (4) (Creamline)	(Philippines) Kathy Bersola (2) (Perlas)	(Philippines) Cherry Rose Nunag^ (Petro Gazz)	(Philippines) Dzi Gervacio (Perlas)	(Philippines) Jia Morado (4) (Creamline)	(Philippines) Anngela Nunag (Army)	
2019	Open	(Philippines) **Jema Galanza**^ (2) (Creamline)	(Philippines) Jovie Prado^ (Petro Gazz)	(Philippines) Kathy Bersola (3) (Perlas)	(Philippines) Jeanette Panaga^ (4) (Petro Gazz)	(Philippines) Tots Carlos^ (Motolite)	(Philippines) Jia Morado (5) (Creamline)	(Philippines) Kyla Atienza^ (Creamline)	
2019	Collegiate	(Philippines) **Trisha Genesis**^ (Adamson)	(Philippines) Faith Nisperos^ (Ateneo)	(Philippines) Lorene Toring (Adamson)	(Philippines) Imee Hernandez (UST)	(Philippines) Klarissa Abriam (Benilde)	(Philippines) Janel Maraguinot^ (Ateneo)	(Philippines) Arianne Daguil (Benilde)	
2021	Open	(Philippines) Alyssa Valdez^ (5) (Creamline)	(Philippines) Myla Pablo^ (3) (Petro Gazz)	(Philippines) Ria Meneses^ (Petro Gazz)	(Philippines) **Jaja Santiago**^ (Note: Jaja Santiago obtained Japanese citizenship in August 2024.) (Chery Tiggo)	(Philippines) Kat Tolentino^ (2) (Choco Mucho)	(Philippines) Jia Morado (6) (Creamline)	(Philippines) Kath Arado^ (Petro Gazz)	
2022	Open	(Philippines) Frances Molina^ (Cignal)	(Philippines) Grethcel Soltones^ (3) (Petro Gazz)	(Philippines) Roselyn Doria^ (Cignal)	(Philippines) Ria Meneses^ (2) (Cignal)	(Philippines) **Tots Carlos**^ (2) (Creamline)	(Philippines) Gel Cayuna^ (Cignal)	(Philippines) Dawn Macandili^ (F2 Logistics)	
2022	Invitational	(Philippines) Alyssa Valdez^ (6) (Creamline)	(Philippines) Frances Molina^ (2) (Cignal)	(Philippines) Mika Reyes^ (PLDT)	(Philippines) Dell Palomata^ (PLDT)	(Philippines) **Tots Carlos**^ (3) (Creamline)	(Chinese Taipei) Liao Yi-Jen (KingWhale)	(Chinese Taipei) Qiu Shi-Qing (KingWhale)	
2022	Reinforced	(Philippines) Alyssa Valdez^ (7) (Creamline)	(Philippines) Myla Pablo^ (4) (Petro Gazz)	(Philippines) (United States) MJ Phillips^ (Petro Gazz)	(Philippines) Roselyn Doria^ (2) (Cignal)	(Philippines) **Mylene Paat**^ (Chery Tiggo)	(Philippines) Jia de Guzman (7) (Creamline)	(Philippines) Ria Beatriz Duremdes^ (Chery Tiggo)	
2023	1st All-Filipino	(Philippines) **Tots Carlos**^ (4) (Creamline)	(Philippines) Jema Galanza^ (3) (Creamline)	(Philippines) Remy Palma^ (Petro Gazz)	(Philippines) (United States) MJ Phillips^ (2) (Petro Gazz)	(Philippines) Michelle Gumabao^ (2) (Creamline)	(Philippines) Jia de Guzman (8) (Creamline)	(Philippines) Kath Arado^ (2) (PLDT)	
2023	Invitational	(Japan) Asaka Tamaru (Kurashiki)	(Philippines) Alyssa Valdez^ (8) (Creamline)	(Philippines) Majoy Baron^ (F2 Logistics)	(Philippines) Celine Domingo^ (2) (Creamline)	(Philippines) Tots Carlos^ (5) (Creamline)	(Philippines) Gel Cayuna^ (2) (Cignal)	(Philippines) Kath Arado^ (3) (PLDT)	
2023	2nd All-Filipino	(Philippines) Eya Laure^ (Chery Tiggo)	(Philippines) Jema Galanza^ (4) (Creamline)	(Philippines) Jeanette Panaga^ (5) (Creamline)	(Philippines) Ria Meneses^ (3) (Cignal)	(Philippines) Michelle Gumabao^ (3) (Creamline)	(Philippines) Gel Cayuna^ (3) (Cignal)	(Philippines) Thang Ponce^ (2) (Choco Mucho)	

=== From 2024 ===
Starting from the 2024–25 season, the two Best Outside Hitters and two Best Middle Blockers were no longer ranked.

Season	Conference	Best Outside Hitters		Best Middle Blockers		Best Opposite Hitter	Best Setter	Best Libero	Ref.
2024–25	2024 All-Filipino	(Philippines) Jema Galanza^ (5) (Creamline)	(Philippines) Sisi Rondina^ (Choco Mucho)	(Philippines) Maddie Madayag^ (2) (Choco Mucho)	(Philippines) Jeanette Panaga^ (6) (Creamline)	(Philippines) Aiza Maizo-Pontillas^ (Petro Gazz)	(Philippines) Kyle Negrito^ (Creamline)	(Philippines) Thang Ponce^ (3) (Choco Mucho)	
2024–25	Reinforced	(Philippines) Grethcel Soltones^ (4) (Akari)	(Philippines) (United States) Brooke Van Sickle^ (Petro Gazz)	(Philippines) Majoy Baron^ (2) (PLDT)	(Philippines) Lourdes Clemente^ (Capital1)	(Philippines) Trisha Tubu^ (Farm Fresh)	(Philippines) Gel Cayuna^ (4) (Cignal)	(Philippines) Alyssa Eroa^ (Galeries Tower)	
2024–25	Invitational	(Venezuela) María José Pérez (Cignal)	(United States) Erica Staunton (Creamline)	(Philippines) Jacqueline Acuña (Cignal)	(Malaysia) Low Mei Cing (Kurashiki)	(Japan) Saya Taniguchi (Kurashiki)	(Philippines) Kyle Negrito^ (2) (Creamline)	(Thailand) Kalyarat Khamwong (Est Cola)	
2024–25	2024–25 All-Filipino	(Philippines) (Canada) Savi Davison^ (PLDT)	(Philippines) Bernadeth Pons^ (Creamline)	(Philippines) Bea de Leon^ (Creamline)	(Philippines) Thea Gagate^ (Zus Coffee)	(Philippines) Trisha Tubu^ (2) (Farm Fresh)	(Philippines) Kyle Negrito^ (3) (Creamline)	(Philippines) Thang Ponce^ (4) (Choco Mucho)	
2025–26	PVL on Tour	(Philippines) Myla Pablo^ (5) (Petro Gazz)	(Philippines) Alyssa Valdez^ (9) (Creamline)	(Philippines) Majoy Baron^ (3) (PLDT)	(Philippines) Jeanette Panaga^ (7) (Creamline)	(Philippines) Trisha Tubu^ (3) (Farm Fresh)	(Philippines) Kyle Negrito^ (4) (Creamline)	(Philippines) Kath Arado^ (4) (PLDT)	
2025–26	Invitational	(Philippines) Jema Galanza^ (6) (Creamline)	(Japan) Nagisa Komatsuda (Kobe Shinwa)	(Philippines) Riza Nogales^ (Zus Coffee)	(Philippines) Jeanette Panaga^ (8) (Creamline)	(Philippines) Ara Galang^ (Chery Tiggo)	(Japan) Sakura Furuta (Kobe Shinwa)	(Philippines) Kath Arado^ (5) (PLDT)	
2025–26	Reinforced	(Philippines) (Canada) Savi Davison^ (2) (PLDT)	(Philippines) (United States) Brooke Van Sickle^ (2) (Petro Gazz)	(Philippines) Maddie Madayag^ (3) (Choco Mucho)	(Philippines) Jeanette Panaga^ (9) (Creamline)	(Philippines) Trisha Tubu^ (4) (Farm Fresh)	(Philippines) Cloanne Mondoñedo^ (Zus Coffee)	(Philippines) Thang Ponce^ (5) (Choco Mucho)	
2025–26	All-Filipino	(Philippines) Bella Belen^ (Capital1)	(Philippines) (United States) Brooke Van Sickle^ (3) (Nxled)	(Philippines) Riza Nogales^ (2) (Zus Coffee)	(Philippines) Jeanette Panaga^ (10) (Creamline)	(Philippines) Trisha Tubu^ (5) (Farm Fresh)	(Philippines) Gel Cayuna^ (5) (Cignal)	(Philippines) Kath Arado^ (6) (PLDT)	
2026–27	Invitational	(Philippines) (Canada) Savi Davison^ (3) (PLDT)	(Philippines) Jonah Sabete^ (Nxled)	(Philippines) (United States) MJ Phillips^ (3) (Nxled)	(Japan) (Philippines) Jaja Santiago^ (2) (Creamline)	(Thailand) **Papatchaya Phontham** (Est Cola)	(Philippines) Gel Cayuna^ (6) (Nxled)	(Philippines) Kath Arado^ (7) (PLDT)	

=== Most selections ===
The following table only lists players with at least five total selections.

Player	Pos.	Total
(Philippines) Jeanette Panaga	MB	10
(Philippines) Alyssa Valdez	OH	9
(Philippines) Jia Morado-de Guzman	S	8
(Philippines) Kath Arado	L	7
(Philippines) Gel Cayuna	S	6
(Philippines) Jema Galanza	OH	6
(Philippines) Myla Pablo	OH	5
(Philippines) Tots Carlos	OP/OH	5
(Philippines) Trisha Tubu	OH	5

== See also ==
- Spikers' Turf Elite Team
