= 2019 Premier Volleyball League season =

Third season of the Premier Volleyball League

- League: Premier Volleyball League
- Sport: Volleyball
- Duration: May 26 – October 12, 2019
- TV partner(s): ABS-CBN Sports and Action; Liga

Conferences
- Reinforced champions: Petro Gazz
- Reinforced runners-up: Creamline
- Open champions: Creamline
- Open runners-up: Petro Gazz
- Collegiate champions: Adamson
- Collegiate runners-up: UST

PVL seasons
- ← 2018 2021 →

The 2019 Premier Volleyball League (PVL) season was the third season of the Premier Volleyball League that started on May 26, 2019 at the Filoil Flying V Center in San Juan.

== All-Star Game ==
2019 Premier Volleyball League All-Star Game
Tournament information
- Sport: Volleyball
- Location: San Juan
- Date: February 2, 2019
- Administrator: Sports Vision
- Tournament format: All-star game
- Venue: Filoil Flying V Centre
- Participants: Premier Volleyball League players

During the preseason, the league hosted its third all-star game on February 2, 2019. Like the 2017 All-Star Game, the event was held at Filoil Flying V Centre in San Juan.

Alyssa Valdez and Myla Pablo headed the two teams, blue and red, respectively. The all-star game was staged to generate funds for the benefit of the Help Educate and Rear Orphans (Hero) Foundation. Collegiate players who play in the University Athletic Association of the Philippines (UAAP) sat out of the event due to it being held near the opening of UAAP Season 81.

This would also be the last all-star match hosted by the PVL until the 2026 Volleyball All-Star Showcase.

Blue Team
Player	Team	Pos.	No. of selections
Kathy Bersola	BanKo Perlas Spikers	MB	2
Grazielle Bombita			1
Jessey de Leon			1
Melissa Gohing	Creamline Cool Smashers	L	2
Michele Gumabao	Creamline Cool Smashers	OP	1
Maddie Madayag	Ateneo Lady Eagles	MB	1
Isa Molde	Motolite Power Builders; UP Lady Maroons	OH	2
Dani Ravena	Ateneo Lady Eagles	L	1
Chie Saet	Petro Gazz Angels	S	1
Risa Sato	Creamline Cool Smashers	MB	2
Nicole Tiamzon	BanKo Perlas Spikers	OH	2
Alyssa Valdez	Creamline Cool Smashers	OH	1
Deanna Wong	Ateneo Lady Eagles	L/S	1
Head coach: Jerry Yee (Petro Gazz Angels)
Assistant coach: Tai Bundit (Creamline Cool Smashers)

Red Team
Player	Team	Pos.	No. of selections
Joy Dacoron	Adamson Lady Falcons	MB	1
Bea de Leon	Ateneo Lady Eagles	MB	2
Jem Ferrer	BanKo Perlas Spikers	S	2
Jema Galanza	Creamline Cool Smashers	OH	1
Vanie Gandler	Ateneo Lady Eagles	OH	1
Jia Morado	Creamline Cool Smashers	S	2
Cherry Nunag	Petro Gazz Angels	MB	1
Myla Pablo	Motolite Power Builders	OH	2
Dell Palomata	Philippine Air Force Lady Jet Spikers	MB	2
Dimdim Pacres	Free agent	OP	1
Thang Ponce	Motolite Power Builders / Adamson Lady Falcons	L	1
Jonah Sabete	Petro Gazz Angels	OH	1
Kat Tolentino	Choco Mucho Flying Titans	OP	1
Head coach: Oliver Almadro (Ateneo Lady Eagles)
Assistant coach: Jasper Jimenez (Philippine Air Force Lady Jet Spikers)

Match result

- Philippines Standard Time (UTC+08:00)

Date	Time	Teams	Set	1	2	3	4	5	Total	Report
Feb 02	18:00	Red team	3	25	25	25			75	P–2
Feb 02	18:00	Blue team	0	19	16	20			55	P–2

== Reinforced conference ==
The 2019 Premier Volleyball League Reinforced Conference was the seventh conference of the Premier Volleyball League and the first conference of the 2019 season. Conference started on May 26, 2019. Grand Fans Day was held at the Trinoma Activity Center, Quezon City on April 25, 2019. Games were held at the Filoil Flying V Centre, San Juan, Philippines. Philippine Army returned as Pacific Town-Army Lady Troopers and Motolite Power Builders returned with a new set of players.

=== Participating teams ===
2019 Premier Volleyball League Reinforced Conference
Abbr.	Team	Affiliation	Head coach	Team captain	Imports
BLP	BaliPure Purest Water Defenders	Balibago Waterworks System, Inc.	(Philippines) Rommel Abella	(Philippines) Grazielle Bombita	(Montenegro) Danijela Dzakovic (Slovakia) Alexandra Vajdovä
BPS	BanKo Perlas Spikers	BPI Direct BanKo, Inc. and Beach Volleyball Republic	(Thailand) Apichat Kongsawat	(Philippines) Nicole Anne Tiamzon	(Thailand) Sutadta Chuewulim (United States) Jeane Mae Horton (United States) Lakia Bright (replaced)^{a} (Turkey) Yasemin Yildirim (replaced)^{b}
CCS	Creamline Cool Smashers	Republic Biscuit Corporation	(Thailand) Tai Bundit	(Philippines) Alyssa Valdez	(Venezuela) Aleoscar Blanco (Thailand) Kuttika Kaewpin
MOT	Motolite Power Builders	Philippine Batteries Inc.	(United States) Airess Padda	(Philippines) Myla Pablo	(Bosnia and Herzegovina) Edina Selimovic (replaced)^{c} (Trinidad and Tobago) Krystle Esdelle (Trinidad and Tobago) Channon Thompson
PGZ	Petro Gazz Angels	PetroGazz Ventures Phils. Corp.	(Philippines) Arnold Laniog	(United States) Janisa Johnson	(Cuba) Wilma Salas (United States) Janisa Johnson
PTA	PacificTown–Army Lady Troopers	PacificTown Property Ventures Inc. and Philippine Army	(Philippines) Emilio Reyes Jr.	(Philippines) Mary Jean Balse-Pabayo	(Ukraine) Olena Lymareva-Flink (United States) Jenelle Jordan

Notes:

a. Chuewulim replaced Bright.
b. Yildirim was replaced by Horton during the semis.
c. Selimovic was replaced by Esdelle due to injury.

=== Preliminary round ===
Pos	Team	Pld	W	L	Pts	SW	SL	SR	SPW	SPL	SPR	Qualification
1	PetroGazz Angels	10	9	1	27	28	4	7.000	792	624	1.269	Semifinals
2	Creamline Cool Smashers	10	9	1	27	27	7	3.857	817	673	1.214	Semifinals
3	PacificTown–Army Lady Troopers	10	5	5	15	18	19	0.947	818	817	1.001	Semifinals
4	BanKo Perlas Spikers	10	4	6	12	16	21	0.762	776	858	0.904	Semifinals
5	Motolite Power Builders	10	3	7	8	13	25	0.520	809	856	0.945	
6	BaliPure Purest Water Defenders	10	0	10	1	4	30	0.133	649	833	0.779	

=== Final round ===
Semifinals
March 18–21
1 Petro Gazz	3	3
4 BanKo	1	0
March 18–21
2 Creamline	3	3
3 PacificTown–Army	1	0

Championship
March 26–30
Petro Gazz	1	3	3
Creamline	3	1	1
3rd place match
March 26–30
BanKo	3	1	2
PacificTown–Army	2	3	3

=== Awards ===
Award	Player	Team	Ref.
Conference Most Valuable Player	Alyssa Valdez	Creamline	
Finals Most Valuable Player	Janisa Johnson	Petro Gazz	
1st Best Outside Spiker	Alyssa Valdez	Creamline	
2nd Best Outside Spiker	Nicole Tiamzon	BanKo Perlas	
1st Best Middle Blocker	Kathy Bersola	BanKo Perlas	
2nd Best Middle Blocker	Cherry Rose Nunag	Petro Gazz	
Best Opposite Spiker	Dzi Gervacio	BanKo Perlas	
Best Setter	Jia Morado	Creamline	
Best Libero	Angela Nunag	PacificTown–Army	
Best Foreign Guest Player	Wilma Salas	Petro Gazz	

=== Final standings ===
Rank	Team
1st place, gold medalist(s)	Petro Gazz Angels
2nd place, silver medalist(s)	Creamline Cool Smashers
3rd place, bronze medalist(s)	PacificTown-Army Lady Troopers
4	BanKo Perlas Spikers
5	Motolite Power Builders
6	BaliPure Purest Water Defenders

=== Venues ===
- Filoil Flying V Centre, San Juan (main venue)
- University of San Agustin, Iloilo City (PVL on tour)
- Imus City Sports Complex, Cavite (PVL on tour)
- Alonte Sports Arena, Biñan, Laguna (PVL on tour)
- Ynares Center, Antipolo, Rizal (PVL on tour)

== Open conference ==
The 2019 Premier Volleyball League Open Conference was the eighth conference of the Premier Volleyball League and the second conference of the 2019 season. The conference started on August 11, 2019 and ended on November 9, 2019 at the Filoil Flying V Centre, San Juan, Metro Manila, Philippines. Philippine Air Force Women's Volleyball Team returned in action and two new teams joined the conference named Chef's Classics Lady Red Spikers and Choco Mucho Flying Titans (second team of Rebisco).

Teams will play a double-round robin elimination round to determine the final four teams that will advance to the semifinals.

=== Participating teams ===
2019 Premier Volleyball League Open Conference
Abbr.	Team	Affiliation	Head coach	Team captain
BLP	BaliPure Purest Water Defenders	Balibago Waterworks System, Inc.	(Philippines) Rommel Abella	Grazielle Bombita
BPS	BanKo Perlas Spikers	BPI Direct BanKo, Inc and Beach Volleyball Republic	(Thailand) Apichat Kongsawat	Nicole Anne Tiamzon
CCS	Creamline Cool Smashers	Republic Biscuit Corporation	(Thailand) Anusorn Bundit	Alyssa Valdez
MCO	Choco Mucho Flying Titans	Republic Biscuit Corporation	(Philippines) Oliver Almadro	Madeleine Madayag
CFC	Chef's Classics Lady Red Spikers	LJS Group of Companies	(Philippines) Nemesio Gavino Jr.	Justine Tiu
MOT	Motolite Power Builders	Philippine Batteries Inc.	(Kenya) Godfrey Okumu	Iris Tolenada
PAF	Philippine Air Force Lady Jet Spikers	Philippine Air Force	(Philippines) Jasper Jimenez	Wendy Anne Semana
PGZ	Petro Gazz Angels	PetroGazz Ventures Phils. Corp.	(Philippines) Arnold Laniog	Relea Ferina Saet
PTA	PacificTown-Army Lady Troopers	PacificTown Property Ventures Inc. and Philippine Army	(Philippines) Emilio Reyes Jr.	Mary Jean Balse-Pabayo

=== Preliminary round ===
Pos	Team	Pld	W	L	Pts	SW	SL	SR	SPW	SPL	SPR	Qualification
1	Creamline Cool Smashers	16	16	0	48	48	4	12.000	1291	935	1.381	Semifinals
2	Petro Gazz Angels	16	12	4	35	40	16	2.500	1283	1074	1.195	Semifinals
3	BanKo Perlas Spikers	16	10	6	29	34	24	1.417	1295	1224	1.058	Semifinals
4	Motolite Power Builders	16	10	6	26	32	26	1.231	1290	1237	1.043	Semifinals
5	Philippine Air Force Lady Jet Spikers	16	8	8	25	28	28	1.000	1222	1243	0.983	
6	PacificTown-Army Lady Troopers	16	6	10	21	27	33	0.818	1283	1330	0.965	
7	Choco Mucho Flying Titans	16	6	10	20	28	36	0.778	1379	1378	1.001	
8	BaliPure Purest Water Defenders	16	4	12	10	15	43	0.349	1081	1372	0.788	
9	Chef's Classics Lady Red Spikers	16	0	16	2	6	48	0.125	991	1322	0.750	

=== Final round ===
Semifinals
October 26–27
1 Creamline	3	3
4 Motolite	1	0
October 26–27
2 Petro Gazz	3	3
3 BanKo	0	0

Championship
November 6–9
Creamline	3	3
Petro Gazz	0	0
3rd place match
November 6–9
Motolite	0	3	0.750
BanKo	3	1	1.333

=== Awards ===
Award	Player	Team	Ref.
Conference Most Valuable Player	Jema Galanza	Creamline	
Finals Most Valuable Player	Jia Morado	Creamline	
1st Best Outside Spiker	Jema Galanza	Creamline	
2nd Best Outside Spiker	Jovielyn Grace Prado	Petro Gazz	
1st Best Middle Blocker	Kathy Bersola	BanKo Perlas	
2nd Best Middle Blocker	Jeanette Panaga	Petro Gazz	
Best Opposite Spiker	Tots Carlos	Motolite	
Best Setter	Jia Morado	Creamline	
Best Libero	Kyla Atienza	Creamline	

=== Final standings ===
Rank	Team
1st place, gold medalist(s)	Creamline Cool Smashers
2nd place, silver medalist(s)	Petro Gazz Angels
3rd place, bronze medalist(s)	BanKo Perlas Spikers
4	Motolite Power Builders
5	Philippine Air Force Lady Jet Spikers
6	PacificTown-Army Lady Troopers
7	Choco Mucho Flying Titans
8	BaliPure Purest Water Defenders
9	Chef's Classics Lady Red Spikers

=== Venues ===
- Filoil Flying V Centre, San Juan (main venue)
- Malolos Sports and Convention Center, Malolos, Bulacan (PVL on tour)
- Iloilo City (PVL on tour)
- University of St. La Salle Coliseum, Bacolod, Negros Occidental (PVL on tour)

== Collegiate conference ==
The 2019 Premier Volleyball League Collegiate Conference was the ninth conference of the Premier Volleyball League and the third and final conference of the 2019 season. The conference started on August 17, 2019, and ended on October 12, 2019, at the Filoil Flying V Centre, San Juan, Metro Manila, Philippines. Defending champions University of the Philippines skipped this conference, while reigning University Athletic Association of the Philippines champion Ateneo de Manila University returned after sitting out the 2018 collegiate conference.

=== Participating teams ===
2019 Premier Volleyball League Collegiate Conference
Abbr.	Team	Head Coach	Team Captain
ADU	Adamson Lady Falcons	Lerma Giron	Louie Romero
ADM	Ateneo Lady Eagles	Oliver Allan Almadro	Julianne Marie Samonte
AUN	Arellano Lady Chiefs	Roberto Javier	Sarah Princess Verutiao
CSB	Benilde Lady Blazers	Arnold Laniog	Hannah Jewel Lai
CSJ	Letran Lady Knights	Michael Inoferio	Marie Charlemagne Simborio
FEU	FEU Lady Tamaraws	George Pascua	Maria Angelica Cayuna
LPU	Lyceum Lady Pirates	Emiliano "Emil" Lontoc	Ciarnelle Wanta
SBU	San Beda Red Lionesses	Nemesio Gavino Jr.	Cesca Racraquin
SSC	San Sebastian Lady Stags	Roger Gorayeb	Mary Rhose Dapol
TIP	TIP Lady Engineers	Achilles "Boy" Paril	Alexandra Loiuse Rosales
UPH	Perpetual Lady Altas	Michael Cariño	Shyra Mae Umandal
UST	UST Golden Tigresses	Emilio "Kungfu" Reyes Jr.	Kecelyn Galdones

=== Preliminary round ===
==== Pool A ====
Pos	Team	Pld	W	L	Pts	SW	SL	SR	SPW	SPL	SPR	Qualification
1	Adamson Lady Falcons	5	5	0	15	15	1	15.000	389	281	1.384	Semifinals
2	Ateneo Lady Eagles	5	4	1	12	13	5	2.600	428	315	1.359	Semifinals
3	San Beda Red Lionesses	5	3	2	8	10	8	1.250	379	379	1.000	
4	Perpetual Lady Altas	5	1	4	4	5	13	0.385	358	411	0.871	
5	Letran Lady Knights	5	1	4	3	7	14	0.500	419	485	0.864	
6	San Sebastian Lady Stags	5	1	4	3	4	13	0.308	316	418	0.756	

==== Pool B ====
Pos	Team	Pld	W	L	Pts	SW	SL	SR	SPW	SPL	SPR	Qualification
1	UST Golden Tigresses	5	5	0	13	15	5	3.000	455	372	1.223	Semifinals
2	Benilde Lady Blazers	5	4	1	13	14	3	4.667	407	314	1.296	Semifinals
3	FEU Lady Tamaraws	5	3	2	10	11	8	1.375	426	371	1.148	
4	Arellano Lady Chiefs	5	2	3	6	8	10	0.800	377	391	0.964	
5	Lyceum Lady Pirates	5	1	4	3	5	12	0.417	339	368	0.921	
6	TIP Lady Engineers	5	0	5	0	0	15	0.000	187	375	0.499	

=== Final round ===
Semifinals
A1	Adamson Lady Falcons	2	3	3
B2	Benilde Lady Blazers	3	2	1
B1	UST Golden Tigresses	1	3	3
A2	Ateneo Lady Eagles	3	1	2

Finals
Adamson Lady Falcons	3	3	–
UST Golden Tigresses	2	0	–
3rd place
Benilde Lady Blazers	2	1	–
Ateneo Lady Eagles	3	3	–

=== Awards ===
Award		Player	Team	Ref.
Most Valuable Player	Finals	Louie Romero	Adamson	
Most Valuable Player	Conference	Trisha Genesis	Adamson	
Best Open Spikers	1st: 2nd:	Trisha Genesis; Faith Nisperos	Adamson; Ateneo	
Best Middle Blockers	1st: 2nd:	Lorene Toring; Imee Hernandez	Adamson; UST	
Best Opposite Spiker		Klarissa Abriam	Benilde	
Best Setter		Janel Maraguinot	Ateneo	
Best Libero		Arianne Daguil	Benilde	

=== Final standings ===
Rank	Team
1st place, gold medalist(s)	Adamson Lady Falcons
2nd place, silver medalist(s)	UST Golden Tigresses
3rd place, bronze medalist(s)	Ateneo Lady Eagles
4	Benilde Lady Blazers
5	FEU Lady Tamaraws
6	San Beda Red Lionesses
7	Arellano Lady Chiefs
8	Perpetual Lady Altas
9	Letran Lady Knights
10	Lyceum Lady Pirates
11	San Sebastian Lady Stags
12	TIP Lady Engineers

== See also ==
- 2019 Spikers' Turf
