= 2024–25 Petro Gazz Angels season =

Filipino women's volleyball team season

The 2024–25 Petro Gazz Angels season was the sixth season of the Petro Gazz Angels in the Premier Volleyball League (PVL).

In the 2024–25 All-Filipino Conference, after an initial victory against the Choco Mucho Flying Titans, the Angels suffered a straight set loss to the Creamline Cool Smashers. They would win the remaining nine matches to finish with a 10–1 record with 29 points, tied for first place with Creamline, but settled for second due to having an inferior set ratio. They then beat the Capital1 Solar Spikers in straight sets in the qualifying round to advance directly to the final round. In the quarterfinals, they had an immediate scare against the Zus Coffee Thunderbelles after losing the first match, but came back and won the next two matches to advance to the round-robin semifinals. In the semifinals, Petro Gazz won against all of their opponents, bringing them to the championship. They would play for the title against Creamline for the fifth time in league history. Petro Gazz gained the series advantage with a five-set win in the first match, before Creamline exacted that result in the second match. In the third match, Petro Gazz beat the Cool Smashers in four sets to win their third PVL title.

== Roster ==
Petro Gazz Angels
No.	Player	Position	Height	Birth date	School
1	(Philippines) Antoinette Adolfo	Opposite Hitter	1.70 m (5 ft 7 in)	March 23, 2001 (age 25)	AdU
2	(Philippines) Djanel Cheng	Setter	1.70 m (5 ft 7 in)	August 28, 1994 (age 32)	CSB
3	(Philippines) Donnalyn Paralejas	Setter	1.59 m (5 ft 3 in)	May 10, 2000 (age 26)	AU
5	(Philippines) Joy Dacoron	Middle Blocker	1.80 m (5 ft 11 in)	October 11, 1995 (age 30)	AdU
6	(Philippines) Ethan Arce	Middle Blocker	1.76 m (5 ft 9 in)	June 6, 2001 (age 25)	UP
7	(Philippines) Jellie Tempiatura	Libero	1.57 m (5 ft 2 in)	July 24, 1997 (age 29)	AdU
8	(Philippines) Aiza Maizo-Pontillas	Opposite hitter	1.78 m (5 ft 10 in)	February 29, 1988 (age 38)	UST
9	(Philippines) Remy Palma (C)	Middle blocker	1.77 m (5 ft 10 in)	September 8, 1995 (age 31)	FEU
10	(Philippines) (United States) Brooke Van Sickle	Outside Hitter	1.75 m (5 ft 9 in)	March 22, 1999 (age 27)	UH
12	(Philippines) Kecelyn Galdones	Middle blocker	1.75 m (5 ft 9 in)	July 29, 1999 (age 27)	UST
13	(Philippines) (United States) MJ Phillips	Middle blocker	1.82 m (6 ft 0 in)	June 15, 1995 (age 31)	Juniata College
14	(Philippines) Michelle Morente	Libero	1.66 m (5 ft 5 in)	November 4, 1994 (age 31)	DLSU
15	(Philippines) Myla Pablo	Outside hitter	1.78 m (5 ft 10 in)	September 12, 1993 (age 33)	NU
16	(Philippines) Ranya Musa	Middle Blocker	1.80 m (5 ft 11 in)	February 13, 1997 (age 29)	CSB
17	(Philippines) Chie Saet	Setter	1.64 m (5 ft 5 in)	November 24, 1984 (age 41)	DLSU
19	(Philippines) Nicole Tiamzon	Outside hitter	1.68 m (5 ft 6 in)	November 3, 1995 (age 30)	UP
20	(Philippines) Jonah Sabete	Outside hitter	1.70 m (5 ft 7 in)	January 29, 1994 (age 32)	BSU
22	(Philippines) Babylove Barbon	Libero	1.63 m (5 ft 4 in)	April 25, 1999 (age 27)	UST

Coaching staff

- Head coach:
  Koji Tsuzurabara
- Assistant coach:
  Stephen James Patrona
  Jay Chua
  Ramona Bagatsing
  Brian Esqiubel
  Cha Cruz-Behag
- Conditioning Coach:
  Paolo Rivero

Team Staff

- Team Coordinator:
  Evelyn Dris
- Team Manager:
  David Dichupa

Medical Staff

- Physical Therapist:
  Rod Ann Oaferina
  Fe Marie Joy Acordon

== 2024–25 All-Filipino Conference ==
=== Preliminary round ===
==== Standings ====
Pos	Team	Pld	W	L	Pts	SW	SL	SR	SPW	SPL	SPR	Qualification
1	Creamline Cool Smashers	11	10	1	29	32	8	4.000	970	816	1.189	2025 AVC Women's Champions League and Qualifying round
2	Petro Gazz Angels	11	10	1	29	30	8	3.750	909	770	1.181	2025 AVC Women's Champions League and Qualifying round
3	Cignal HD Spikers	11	8	3	25	27	12	2.250	909	794	1.145	Qualifying round
4	PLDT High Speed Hitters	11	8	3	23	27	13	2.077	927	842	1.101	Qualifying round
5	Choco Mucho Flying Titans	11	8	3	20	27	20	1.350	1064	1031	1.032	Qualifying round

Source: Premier Volleyball League

==== Match log ====
2024–25 PVL All-Filipino Conference preliminary round match log
Total: 10–1 (29 points)
November: 2–1 (6 points)

Match	Date	Opponent	Sets	Total	Location Attendance	Record	Pts	Report
1	November 12, 2024	Choco Mucho	3–1	101–85	PhilSports Arena; 3,065	1–0	3	P2
2	November 19, 2024	Creamline	0–3	57–57	Ynares Center; 5,900	1–1	3	P2
3	November 26, 2024	Farm Fresh	3–0	75–57	Candon City Arena; 3,947	2–1	6	P2

December: 3–0 (9 points)

Match	Date	Opponent	Sets	Total	Location Attendance	Record	Pts	Report
4	December 5, 2024	Akari	3–0	82–71	Smart Araneta Coliseum; 560	3–1	9	P2
5	December 10, 2024	PLDT	3–1	87–81	PhilSports Arena; 572	4–1	12	P2
6	December 14, 2024	Cignal	3–0	75–58	PhilSports Arena; 950	5–1	15	P2

January: 1–0 (2 points)

Match	Date	Opponent	Sets	Total	Location Attendance	Record	Pts	Report
7	January 21, 2025	Chery Tiggo	3–2	105–95	PhilSports Arena; 2,372	6–1	17	P2

February: 4–0 (12 points)

Match	Date	Opponent	Sets	Total	Location Attendance	Record	Pts	Report
8	February 4, 2025	Zus Coffee	3–1	102–92	PhilSports Arena; 715	7–1	20	P2
9	February 11, 2025	Capital1	3–0	75–46	PhilSports Arena; 1,069	8–1	23	P2
10	February 15, 2025	Galeries Tower	3–0	75–54	Ynares Center; 3,010	9–1	26	P2
11	February 20, 2025	Nxled	3–0	75–50	PhilSports Arena; 1,556	10–1	29	P2

=== Qualifying round ===
==== Match log ====
2024–25 PVL All-Filipino Conference qualifying round match log
Total: 1–0 (3 points)
Qualifying round: 1–0 (3 points)

Date	Opponent	Sets	Total	Location Attendance	Report
March 1, 2025	Capital1	3–0	75–63	PhilSports Arena; 1,960	P2

=== Final round ===
==== Bracket ====
Quarterfinals
1	Creamline	2
8	Chery Tiggo	0
2	Petro Gazz	2
7	Zus Coffee	1
3	Galeries Tower	0
6	Akari	2
4	PLDT	0
5	Choco Mucho	2

Semifinals
Creamline	6
Petro Gazz	9
Choco Mucho	1
Akari	2

Finals
Championship
Creamline	1
Petro Gazz	2
Third-place
Choco Mucho	1
Akari	2

===== Semifinals standings =====
Pos	Team	Pld	W	L	Pts	SW	SL	SR	SPW	SPL	SPR	Qualification
1	Petro Gazz Angels	3	3	0	9	9	2	4.500	272	232	1.172	Championship
2	Creamline Cool Smashers	3	2	1	6	7	3	2.333	236	201	1.174	Championship
3	Akari Chargers	3	1	2	2	3	8	0.375	224	256	0.875	3rd place
4	Choco Mucho Flying Titans	3	0	3	1	3	9	0.333	241	284	0.849	3rd place

Source: Premier Volleyball League

==== Match log ====
2024–25 PVL All-Filipino Conference final round match log
Total: 7–2 (21 points)
Quarterfinals: 2–1 (6 points)

Match	Date	Opponent	Sets	Total	Location Attendance	Series	Report
1	March 18, 2025	Zus Coffee	0–3	69–77	PhilSports Arena; 2,611	0–1	P2
2	March 22, 2025	Zus Coffee	3–0	78–58	Ynares Center Antipolo; 3,224	1–1	P2
3	March 25, 2025	Zus Coffee	3–0	75–63	PhilSports Arena; 608	2–1	P2

Semifinals: 3–0 (9 points)

Match	Date	Opponent	Sets	Total	Location Attendance	Record	Pts	Report
1	March 29, 2025	Creamline	3–1	96–86	Ynares Center Antipolo; 8,360	1–0	3	P2
2	April 1, 2025	Choco Mucho	3–1	101–86	PhilSports Arena; 7,485	2–0	6	P2
3	April 3, 2025	Akari	3–0	75–60	Smart Araneta Coliseum; 5,471	3–0	9	P2

Championship: 2–1 (6 points)

Match	Date	Opponent	Sets	Total	Location Attendance	Series	Report
1	April 8, 2025	Creamline	3–2	103–97	Smart Araneta Coliseum; 8,841	1–0	P2
2	April 10, 2025	Creamline	2–3	95–96	Smart Araneta Coliseum; 9,058	1–1	P2
3	April 12, 2025	Creamline	3–1	98–81	PhilSports Arena; 10,226	2–1	P2

== AVC Women's Volleyball Champions League ==
=== Match log ===
Date	Time		Score		Set 1	Set 2	Set 3	Set 4	Set 5	Total	Report
Apr. 21	16:00	Petro Gazz Angels (Philippines)	1–3	(Chinese Taipei) Taipower	15–25	16–25	25–19	20–25		76–94	P2 Report
Apr. 22	19:00	Hip Hing Women's Volleyball Team (Hong Kong)	0–3	(Philippines) Petro Gazz Angels	8–25	12–25	12–25			32–75	P2 Report

=== Final round ===
==== Quarterfinals ====
Date	Time		Score		Set 1	Set 2	Set 3	Set 4	Set 5	Total	Report
Apr. 25	19:00	Petro Gazz Angels (Philippines)	2–3	(China) BAIC Motor Volleyball Club	29–31	25–19	25–20	20–25	12–15	111–110	P2 Report

== Transactions ==
=== Subtractions ===
Player	New team	Ref.
Ivy Perez	Nxled Chameleons	
