= Beach Volleyball Republic results =

Beach Volleyball Republic
- Sport: Beach Volleyball
- Founded: 2015
- Country: Philippines
- Most recent champions: W: Melody Pons and Sheena Cafe; M: Johnwayne Dionela and Rain Skyler Gemarino
- Broadcaster: ABS-CBN
- Website: Beach Volleyball Republic; BVR on Facebook

Beach Volleyball Republic, Inc. (BVR) is an organization aimed at the development of beach volleyball in the Philippines. It was formed in June 2015.

== 2016 Nationwide Tour ==
Aside from the 5 legs, BVR organized another leg on May 20–21 for their nationwide tour before moving back to Manila for the culmination of the tour on May 26–29 at the Sands SM By the Bay. Starting with the Boracay leg, the semifinals and finals matches of the BVR on Tour events were aired on ABS-CBN Sports+Action, the official broadcast partner of BVR.

=== Cabugao, Ilocos Sur ===
The inaugural staging of the BVR Nationwide Tour was held on January 30–31, 2016 at the Cabugao Beach Resort, Cabugao, Ilocos Sur. 8 teams (divided into two groups) participated in the two-day event. The winner of the event received a 70,000 pesos cash prize.

Group	Team	Players
Pool A	BVR Team 1	Bea Tan and Aby Maraño
Pool A	Bacolod	April Hingpit and Patty Orendain
Pool A	Philippine Army	Jovelyn Gonzaga and Nerissa Bautista
Pool A	RTU Team A	Jessa Aranda and Pricilla Gail Catacutan
Pool B	BVR Team 2	Charo Soriano and Alexa Micek
Pool B	Philippine Air Force	Judy Caballejo and Anna Camille Abanto
Pool B	Batangas	Kiara Aira Pineza and Jessica Paron
Pool B	RTU Team B	Michelle Morente and Jonafer San Pedro

Final standings

Rank	Team
1st place, gold medalist(s)	Jovelyn Gonzaga and Nerissa Bautista (def. Soriano-Micek tandem, 21–13, 21–10)
2nd place, silver medalist(s)	Charo Soriano and Alexa Micek
3rd place, bronze medalist(s)	Bea Tan and Aby Maraño

=== San Juan, La Union ===
The second leg of the BVR On Tour was held at the Kahuna Beach Resort, San Juan, La Union on February 14, 2016.

Team	Players
Air Force	Judy Caballejo and Anna Camille Abanto
BVR Team 1	Bea Tan and Aby Maraño
BVR Team 2	Charo Soriano and Alexa Micek
BVR Team 3	Gretchen Ho and Melissa Gohing
Cordilleras	Jessica Dacanay and Roxanne Almonte
RTU	Jonaver San Pedro and Jessica Aranda

Final standings

Rank	Team
1st place, gold medalist(s)	Charo Soriano and Alexa Micek (def. Air Force team, 21–13, 21–7)
2nd place, silver medalist(s)	Judy Caballejo and Anna Camille Abanto
3rd place, bronze medalist(s)	Jonaver San Pedro and Jessica Aranda

=== Anguib, Cagayan ===
The third leg of the BVR On Tour was held at the Anguib Beach, Santa Ana, Cagayan on February 20–21, in partnership with the Cagayan Grand Adventure and Leisure (CGAL) and Cagayan Economic Zone Authority (CEZA) .

Participants

- Charo Soriano and Alexa Micek
- Judy Caballejo and Jennifer Manzano
- Jona San Pedro and Tati Sablan
- Bea Tan and Dzi Gervacio
- Wendy Semana and Coyah Abanto
- Jessa Aranda and Jas Wenzel
- Mara Salde and Gem Seguirre
- Angel Antipuesto and Melissa Gohing

Final standings

Rank	Team
1st place, gold medalist(s)	Charo Soriano and Alexa Micek
2nd place, silver medalist(s)	Judy Caballejo and Jennifer Manzano
3rd place, bronze medalist(s)	Bea Tan and Dzi Gervacio
4	Wendy Anne Semana and Anna Camille Abanto

=== Lakawon Island, Cadiz, Negros Occidental ===
The fourth leg of the BVR On Tour was held on Lakawon Island, Cadiz, Negros Occidental, on March 18–19, 2016. Bea Tan and Fiola Ceballos won the fourth leg's championship match against a guest team from Iloilo.

Participants

- Jonafer San Pedro and Jessa Aranda
- Dzi Gervacio and Melissa Gohing
- May Ann Pantino and Coyah Abanto
- Bea Tan and Fiola Ceballos
- Charo Soriano and Alexa Micek
- Angel Antipuesto and Jennifer Manzano
- Iya Yongco and Denden Lazaro
- Jennifer Cosas and Erjane Magdato (Bacolod)
- Jane Vorster and Tatiana Sablan (Guam)
- Jackielyn Estoquia and DM Demontano (Iloilo)

Final standings

Rank	Team
1st place, gold medalist(s)	Bea Tan and Fiola Ceballos
2nd place, silver medalist(s)	Jackielyn Estoquia and DM Demontano
3rd place, bronze medalist(s)	Jane Vorster and Tatiana Sablan

=== Clark, Pampanga ===
The fifth leg of the BVR on Tour was held at the Villages at Global Clark, Clark Freeport Zone, Pampanga on April 16–17, 2016.

Participants

- Gretchel Soltones and Alyssa Eroa
- Charo Soriano and Alexa Micek
- Bea Tan and Dzi Gervacio
- Jona San Pedro and Jessica Aranda
- Jennifer Manzano and Angel Antipuesto
- Caitlin Viray and Kaitlin Gormley
- Tatiana Sablan and Chloe Reimer
- Denden Lazaro and Ella de Jesus
- Judy Caballejo and Coyah Abanto
- Michelle Morente and Janine Marciano
- Pam Legaspi and Arylle Magtalas
- Joy Cases and Nene Tapic

Final standings

Rank	Team
1st place, gold medalist(s)	Gretchel Soltones and Alyssa Eroa
2nd place, silver medalist(s)	Charo Soriano and Alexa Micek
3rd place, bronze medalist(s)	Judy Caballejo and Coyah Abanto

=== Boracay Island, Malay, Aklan ===
The sixth leg of the BVR on Tour was held at Boracay Island, Malay, Aklan on April 27–28, 2016. The semifinals and finals of the leg was aired on a delayed basis on ABS-CBN Sports and Action (Channel 23 and HD 166). The tandem of Soriano and Micek emerged as the leg's champions after beating the team from the Philippine Air Force in the finals.

Participants

- Charo Soriano and Alexa Micek
- Judy Caballejo and Coyah Abanto
- Bea Tan and Fiola Ceballos
- Jackie Estoquia and DM Demontano
- Dzi Gervacio and Mik Marciano
- Jona San Pedro and Tatiana Sablan
- Perper Cosas and Lopa Saraum
- Dior Vergara and Linlyn Torado

Final standings

Rank	Team
1st place, gold medalist(s)	Charo Soriano and Alexa Micek (def. Caballejo and Abanto in finals match, 21–15, 21–16)
2nd place, silver medalist(s)	Judy Caballejo and Camille Abanto
3rd place, bronze medalist(s)	Bea Tan and Fiola Ceballos

=== Bayawan, Negros Oriental ===
The seventh and the final leg before the national championships of the BVR on Tour was held in Bayawan, Negros Oriental on May 20–21, 2016, in partnership with the local government of Bayawan. BVR teams and some teams from Negros took part in the two-day tourney.

Final standings

Rank	Team
1st place, gold medalist(s)	Charo Soriano and Alexa Micek
2nd place, silver medalist(s)	Erjane Magdato and Jenny Mar Señares
3rd place, bronze medalist(s)	Bea Tan and Dzi Gervacio

=== National Championships ===
The National Championships of the Beach Volleyball Republic was held at the Sands, SM By the Bay in Pasay on May 26–27, 2016. Winning teams from different BVR legs and invited teams participated in the culmination of the 5-month long BVR nationwide tour. Qualifiers, semifinals and finals was aired also on ABS-CBN Sports+Action. Lakawon leg winners Bea Tan and Fiola Ceballos were crowned as the national champions.

Participants

Group	Players
Pool A	Charo Soriano and Alexa Micek (BVR 1)
Pool A	Jennifer Cosas and Floremej Rodriguez (Negros)
Pool A	Nieza Viray and Jeziela Viray (San Beda)
Pool A	Tatiana Sablan and Imee Ilao (Hawaii/Guam)
Pool B	Judy Caballejo and Coyah Abanto (Air Force)
Pool B	Jackie Estoquia and DM Demontano (Iloilo)
Pool B	Rhea Fermilan and Javen Sabas (PUP)
Pool B	Therese Ramas and Janelle Cabahug (Cebu)
Pool C	Jonafer San Pedro and Jessa Aranda (RTU)
Pool C	Bea Tan and Fiola Cebballos (BVR 3)
Pool C	Cherilyn Sindayen and Rainne Fabay (Lyceum)
Pool C	Lourdilyn Catubag and Karen Quilario (Tagum)
Pool D	Dzi Gervacio and Michelle Morente (BVR 2)
Pool D	Apple Saraum and Jusabelle Brillo (Cebu)
Pool D	Isa Molde and Diana Carlos (UP)
Pool D	Erjane Magdato and Alexa Polidario (Bacolod)

Final standings

Rank	Team
1st place, gold medalist(s)	Bea Tan and Fiola Ceballos (def. Rodriguez and Cosas, 21–19, 18–21, 15–7)
2nd place, silver medalist(s)	Jennifer Cosas and Floremej Rodriguez
3rd place, bronze medalist(s)	Judy Caballejo and Coyah Abanto
4	Charo Soriano and Alexa Micek

=== Invitational Tour ===
After its successful nationwide tour, BVR held its invitational tournament featuring 10 international teams from the United States, Brazil, Singapore, Thailand, New Zealand and Hong Kong and 2 local duos (BVR shareholders Bea Tan and Charo Soriano and national championship runner-up Jennifer Cosas and Floremej Rodriguez) on June 9–11, 2016 at the Anguib Beach, Santa Ana, Cagayan. Several matches were aired on ABS-CBN Sports and Action on June 18–19, 2016.

The invitational tournament was sanctioned by the Larong Volleyball sa Pilipinas, Inc. (LVPI), the country's volleyball national sports association.

Group	Players
Pool A	(Brazil) Mimi Amaral and Bruna Figueredo
Pool A	(Philippines) Jennifer Cosas and Floremej Rodriguez
Pool A	(Singapore) Tan Shieng Theng and Ong Wei Yu
Pool B	(Philippines) Bea Tan and Charo Soriano
Pool B	(United States) Jennifer Snyder and Chara Harris
Pool B	(Hong Kong) Kong Cheuk Yee and To Wing Tung
Pool C	(Thailand) Yupa Phokongploy and (United States) Rachel Sherman
Pool C	(Brazil) Erica Adachi and Rupia Inck
Pool C	(Singapore) Rachel Lau Yue Ting and Eliza Chong Hui Hui
Pool D	(New Zealand) Julia Tilley and Alice Bain
Pool D	(United States) Alexa Micek and Leah Hinkey
Pool D	(Hong Kong) Lo Wai Yan and Yueng Yuk Mei

Final standings

Rank	Team
1st place, gold medalist(s)	(Brazil) Mimi Amaral and Bruna Figueredo (def. Snyder and Harris, 21–14, 18–21, 15–9)
2nd place, silver medalist(s)	(United States) Jennifer Snyder and Chara Harris
3rd place, bronze medalist(s)	(United States) Alexa Micek and Leah Hinkey
4	(New Zealand) Julia Tilley and Alice Bain

== 2017 Nationwide Tour ==
=== Metro Manila ===
- Date: April 22–23, 2017
- Location: SM Sands by the Bay, SM Mall of Asia

Leg 5 of the BVR on Tour 2017 was in SM Mall of Asia for a two-day tournament that featured both the men's and women's division.

Participating teams

Women's Division
Team	Players
Japan	Keiko Urata and Chiyo Suzuki
Hong Kong and Singapore	Lo Wai Yan and Tan Xiang Ting
BVR-A	Bea Tan and Rupia Inck
BVR-B	Dzi Gervacio and Iya Yongco
BVR-C	Amanda Villanueva and Rapril Aguilar
Airforce	Camille Abanto and May Ann Pantino
Visayas	Jackie Estoquia and Jennifer Cosas
Tagum	Lot Catubag and Kaka Quilaro

Men's Division
Team	Players
UST	KR Guzman and Anthony Arbasto
FEU	Jeremiah Barrica and Kevin Hadlocon
Bacolod	Simon Aguillon and Ralph Savellano
Army	Jason Uy and Jaidal Abdulmajid
Navy	Milo Parcon and Boboy Medino
Air Force	Edwin Tolentino and Mike Abria
OSI	Pemie Bagalay and Peejay Cuzon
Perpetual	Relan Taneo and Rey Taneo Jr.

Final standings

- Women's division champions – Keiko Urata and Chiyo Suzuki (Japan)
- Women's division runner-up – Bea Tan and Rupia Inck (BVR-A)
- Men's division champions – Jeremiah Barrica and Kevin Hadlocon (FEU)
- Men's division runner-up – KR Guzman and Anthony Arbasto (UST)

=== Currimao, Ilocos Norte ===
- Date: May 20–21, 2017
- Location: Playa Tropical Resort, Currimao, Ilocos Norte

The Ilocos Norte leg was BVR's sixth leg for 2017.

Participating teams

Women's Collegiate
Team	Players
UST	Cherry Rondina and Cecilia Bangad
Ateneo-A	Mich Morente and Ria Lo
Ateneo-B	Ana Gopico and Gizelle Tan
San Beda	Ma. Nieza Viray and Ma. Jeziela Viray
RTU	Mary Jane Ruiz and Myla Lim
UB	Mary Ann Atuban and Carmela Dicksen
SWU	Floremel Rodriguez and Therese Ramas
Currimao	local team from MMSU

Men's Collegiate
Team	Players
UST	Anthony Arbasto and Ian Lester Yee
FEU	Gerard Beliran and Salmar Provido
UB	Bon Jobert Hasal and Jadway Milet
Mapúa	Alfred Pagulong and Sam Damian
Ateneo	Ish Polvorosa and Karl Baysa
Visayas	John Kevin Juban and Fortunato Libres
Malaysia	Mohd Aizzzat Zokri and Raja Nazmi Hussin
Hong Kong	Ka Yun Wong and Chun Kit Li

Men's Open Invitational
Team	Players
Malaysia	Mohd Faiz Putra Rayak and Muhammad Afiq Idris
Hong Kong	Giovanni Musillo and Brian Nordberg
FEU	Edilberto Denoy and Joshua Barrica
OSI	Philip Bagalay and Peejay Cuzon
VNS	Jahir Ebrahim and Julius Sioson
RTU	Carlo Sebastian and Antonio Torres
Ilocos	

Final standings Women's Collegiate Bracket-A

Rank	Team
1st place, gold medalist(s)	Sisi Rondina and Cecilia Bangad (UST)
2nd place, silver medalist(s)	Ma. Nieza Viray and Ma. Jeziela Viray (SBC)
3rd place, bronze medalist(s)	Mich Morente and Ria Lo (Ateneo-A)
4	Currimao

Final standings Women's Collegiate Bracket-B

Rank	Team
1st place, gold medalist(s)	Floremel Rodriguez and Theres Ramas (SWU)
2nd place, silver medalist(s)	Ana Gopico and Gizelle Tan (Ateneo-B)
3rd place, bronze medalist(s)	Mary Ann Atuban and Carmela Dicksen (UB)
4	Mary Jane Ruiz and Myla Lim (RTU)

Final standings Men's Division

- Bracket-A men's collegiate champions – Mohd Aizzzat Zokri and Raja Nazmi (Malaysia)
- Bracket-B men's collegiate champions – Jeremiah Barrica and Kevin Hadlocon (FEU)
- Bracket-A men's Open Invitational champions – Giovanni Musillo and Brian Nordberg (Hong Kong)
- Bracket-B men's Open Invitational champions – Jade Becaldo and Rommel Pepito (Cebu-A)

=== Moalboal, Cebu ===
- Date: June 30-July 1, 2017
- Location: Basdaku White Beach, Moalboal, Cebu

The Cebu leg was BVR's seventh in 2017and it is the final stop before the 2017 BVR National Championships that happened in July.

Participating teams

Women's

Team	Players
BVR	Charo Soriano and Bea Tan
UNO-R	Erjane Magdato and Alexa Polidario
Iloilo	Mae Demontano and Jackie Estoquia
USJ-R Team A	Paula Maninang and Linlyn Torado
USJ-R Team B	Jessa Jorquia and Venus Sanchez
JRC Dipolog	Renefel Lagata and Grace Barrica
USPF Team A	Tracy Cortez and Mates Gloria
USPF Team B	Ressel Pedrosa and Ruchie Melancolico
USLS	Rosel Sy and Julyna Villanueva
Redline	Jusabelle Brillo and Chona Gesulga
Cebu	Floremel Rodriguez and Rae Ramas

Men's

Team	Players
FEU Team A	Kevin Hadlocon and Jeremiah Barrica
FEU Team B	Edilberto Denoy and Joshua Barrica
Dipolog	Ernie Jacob and Lerven Apor
Bacolod	Ralph Savelano and Jonmar Aguilon
NU	Bryan Bagunas and James Natividad
USLS	Christian Marcelino and Herold Parcia
USJ-R Team A	Jay Verbosidad and Alastair Gairanud
USJ-R Team B	Ariel Gabunada and Jobert Dano
USPF Team A	Jason Reyes and Dan Garnica
USPF Team B	Mark Siacor and Edmar Malata
Cebu Team A	Jade Becaldo and Rommel Pepito
Cebu Team B	John Arioja and Ralph Abanto
Iloilo	Belson Ocampo and Jason Labuyo
UNO-R	Julianmar Perez and Carl Pardilla
Malaysia-A	Aizzat and Safwan
Malaysia-B	-

Final standings

Rank	Women's	Ref.
1st place, gold medalist(s)	Erjane Magdato and Alexa Polidario (UNO-R)	
2nd place, silver medalist(s)	Floremel Rodriguez and Rae Ramas	
3rd place, bronze medalist(s)	Charo Soriano and Bea Tan(Perlas)	
4	Jusabelle Brilo and Chona Gesulga (Redline)	

Rank	Men's	Ref.
1st place, gold medalist(s)	Jade Becaldo and Rommel Pepito (Redline)	
2nd place, silver medalist(s)	Bryan Bagunas and James Natividad (NU)	
3rd place, bronze medalist(s)	Jay Verbosidad and Alastair Gairanud (USJ-R Team A)	
4	Aizzat-Safwan (Malaysia)	

=== National championships ===
- Date: July 28–30, 2017
- Location: Anguib Beach, Santa Ana, Cagayan

The winners in Cagayan were part of the Philippine national team pool for volleyball at the 2017 SEA Games.

Participating teams

Women's

Team	Players
BVR	Bea Tan and Fiola Ceballos
Iloilo	Jacquelyn Estoquia and Mae Demontano
UST	Jinggay Bangad and Caitlyn Viray
Tagum-PNP	Lourdilyn Catubag and Karen Quilario
RTU 1	Jonalyn Rosal and Maciejczk Candido
RTU 2	Myla Lim and Ciarmin Pahalang
SWU	Dij Rodriguez and Terang Ramas
UNO-R	Erjane Magdato and Alexa Polidario
Perpetual	Marijo Medalla and Aurora Tipoli
San Beda	Ma. Nieza Viray and Ma. Jeziela Viray
Batangas	Aira Pineza and Marjolyn Delos Reyes
Cagayan	Mara Salde and Kristine Aldea
Tuguegarao	Riza Guzman and Mariafe Salagan

Men's

Team	Players
UST 1	KR Guzman and Anthony Arbasto
FEU 1	Jeremiah Barrica and Kevin Hadlocon
Cebu	Rommel Pepito and Jade Becaldo
Navy	Roldan Medino and Ardie Pajiji
NU	Ismail Fauzi and James Natividad
FEU 2	Jude Garcia and Richard Solis
USLS	Herold Parcia and Neil De Pedro
UST 2	Ian Lester Yee and Romnick Rico
RTU 1	Antonio Torres and Peter Paul Galvan
RTU 2	Carlo Sebastian and Reymond Balag
Ateneo	Abay Lenos and Basti Cuerva
Dipolog	Joshua Barrica and Ralph Dablo
Perpetual	Jhay Solamillo and Gilbert Balmores
Bohol	Alexander Pelino and Fortunato Libres
Batangas	Ervin Moraga and Steven Santos

Final round

Women's

Semi-finals
July 30
Tagum-PNP (Quilario/Catubag)	2
UNO-R (Magdato/Polidario)	0
July 30
SWU-Cebu (Rodriguez/Ramas)	2
San Beda (Viray/Viray)	0

Final
July 30
Tagum-PNP (Quilario/Catubag)	2
SWU-Cebu (Rodriguez/Ramas)	0
Third place
July 30
UNO-R (Magdato/Polidario)	2
San Beda (Viray/Viray)	1

Reference
Men's

Semi-finals
July 30
Cebu (Pepito/Becaldo)	2
NU (Fauzi/Natividad)	0
July 30
UST1(Guzman/Arbastro)	2
FEU1 (Barrica/Hadlocon)	0

Final
Cebu (Pepito/Becaldo)	2
UST1 (Guzman/Arbastro)	1
Third place
NU (Fauzi/Natividad)	0
FEU1 (Barrica/Hadlocon)	2

== 2018 Nationwide Tour ==
=== El Nido leg ===
- October 27–28, 2018
- Location: Lio Beach, El Nido, Palawan

Women's champion: Charo Soriano/Bea Tan (Seda Hotels) defeated Dzi Gervacio/Roma Doromal (Perlas)
Men's champion: KR Guzman/Ian Yee defeated Hach Gilbuena/Edmar Flores (DAF-ARMM)
Final standings

Rank	Women's	Ref.
1st place, gold medalist(s)	Charo Soriano and Bea Tan (Seda Hotels)	
2nd place, silver medalist(s)	Dzi Gervacio and Roma Doromal (Perlas)	
3rd place, bronze medalist(s)		

Rank	Men's	Ref.
1st place, gold medalist(s)	KR Guzman and Ian Yee (UST)	
2nd place, silver medalist(s)	Hach Gilbuena and Edmar Flores (DAF-ARMM)	
3rd place, bronze medalist(s)		

=== Dumaguete leg ===
- November 20–21, 2018
- Location: Rizal Boulevard sand court, Dumaguete City, Negros Oriental

Final standings

Rank	Women's	Ref.
1st place, gold medalist(s)	Alexa Polidario and Erjane Magdato (UNO-R)	
2nd place, silver medalist(s)	Samaa Miyagawa and Tin Lai (Japan-Hong Kong)	
3rd place, bronze medalist(s)	Babylove Barbon and Genesa Eslapor (UST)	

Rank	Men's	Ref.
1st place, gold medalist(s)	KR Guzman and Krung Arbasto (UNO-R)	
2nd place, silver medalist(s)	Mitabashi Masato and Takashi Tsuchiya (Japan)	
3rd place, bronze medalist(s)	Ranran Abdilla and Jessie Lopez (Air Force)	

=== December Open ===
- December 27–28, 2018
- Location: Sands, SM By the Bay, Pasay

Final standings

Rank	Women's	Ref.
1st place, gold medalist(s)	Dzi Gervacio and Bea Tan (Banko-Perlas 1)	
2nd place, silver medalist(s)	Roma Doromal and Kly Orillaned (NU-Boysen)	
3rd place, bronze medalist(s)	Babylove Barbon and Genesa Eslapor (UST-Maynilad)	

Rank	Men's	Ref.
1st place, gold medalist(s)	Ranran Abdilla and Jessie Lopez (Air Force)	
2nd place, silver medalist(s)	Fauzi Ismail and Edmar Bonono (Cignal)	
3rd place, bronze medalist(s)	KR Guzman and Krung Arbasto (Tiger Winx)	

== 2019 Nationwide Tour ==
=== Santa Fe Open ===
- Date: March 24, 2019
- Location: Santa Fe, Cebu

Final standings

Rank	Women's	Ref.
1st place, gold medalist(s)	Bea Tan and Dij Rodriguez (Perlas Spikers)	
2nd place, silver medalist(s)	Roma Joy and Roma Mae Doromal (NU-Boysen)	
3rd place, bronze medalist(s)	May Ann Pantino and Jozza Cabalza (Air Force 1)	

Rank	Men's	Ref.
1st place, gold medalist(s)	Ranran Abdilla and Jessie Lopez (Air Force-AboitizLand)	
2nd place, silver medalist(s)	Harold Parcia and Neil Depedro (USLS-Bacolod)	
3rd place, bronze medalist(s)	James Buytrago and Pol Salvador (NU Boysen 1)	

== 2021 Nationwide Tour ==
The Beach Volleyball Republic returned in October 2021 after a two-tear hiatus due to the COVID-19 pandemic. It held a two-leg tournament under a bubble format in Santa Ana, Cagayan featuring 11 men's teams and 14 women's teams.

Participating teams

Men's

- Creamline
- PLDT
- ARMY-FSD Makati
- DeliRush
- Tuguegarao
- EVI Construction
- Negros Occidental Beach Volleyball Club

Women's

- Creamline
- PLDT
- TM
- Biogenic
- Eastern Communications
- Toyota-Tuguegarao

- Black Mamba Army
- Sta. Lucia Lady Realtors
- Boysen
- Delimondo
- Good Health-CDO

=== Santa Ana, Cagayan – First leg ===
- Date: October 22–25, 2021
- Location: Anguib Beach

Final standings

Rank	Women's	Ref.
1st place, gold medalist(s)	Sisi Rondina and Bernadeth Pons (Creamline 1)	
2nd place, silver medalist(s)	Babylove Barbon and Gen Eslapor (Good Health-CDO)	
3rd place, bronze medalist(s)	Dij Rodriguez and Dzi Gervacio (Creamline 2)	

Rank	Men's	Ref.
1st place, gold medalist(s)	Krung Arbasto and Jude Garcia (Creamline 2)	
2nd place, silver medalist(s)	Rancel Varga and Efraem Dimaculangan (PLDT)	
3rd place, bronze medalist(s)	Ranran Abdilla and Jaron Requinton (Creamline 1)	

=== Santa Ana, Cagayan – Second leg ===
- Date: October 27–31, 2021
- Location: Anguib Beach

Final standings

Rank	Women's	Ref.
1st place, gold medalist(s)	Sisi Rondina and Bernadeth Pons (Creamline 1)	
2nd place, silver medalist(s)	Dzi Gervacio and Dij Rodriguez (Creamline 2)	
3rd place, bronze medalist(s)	Nieza Viray and Jeziela Viray (PLDT)	

Rank	Men's	Ref.
1st place, gold medalist(s)	Krung Arbasto and Jude Garcia (Creamline 1)	
2nd place, silver medalist(s)	Henry James Pecaña and AJ Pareja (Tuguegarao)	
3rd place, bronze medalist(s)	-	

== 2023 Nationwide Tour ==
=== BVR Recharged ===
- Date: April 15, 2023
- Location: Seafront Residences San Juan, Batangas

Final standings

Rank	Women's	Ref.
1st place, gold medalist(s)	Gen Eslapor and Roma Joy Doromal (BVR)	
2nd place, silver medalist(s)	Bea Tan and Dzi Gervacio (PetroGazz)	
3rd place, bronze medalist(s)	Bianca Lizares and Janine Navarro (DELIMONDO)	

Rank	Men's	Ref.
1st place, gold medalist(s)	Krung Arbasto and Rancel Varga (AMC Cotabato)	
2nd place, silver medalist(s)	Dominique Gabito and Alchie Gupiteo (UST)	
3rd place, bronze medalist(s)	Henry Pecana, and AJ Pareja (BVR)	

=== Candon, Ilocos Sur ===
- Date: June 17–18, 2023
- Location: Darapidap Beach, City of Candon, Ilocos Sur

Final standings

Rank	Women's	Ref.
1st place, gold medalist(s)	Kly Orillaneda and Kathrina Epa (NU)	
2nd place, silver medalist(s)	Bianca Lizares and Honey Grace Cordero (Bacolod)	
3rd place, bronze medalist(s)	Bea Tan and Jennifer Cosas (West V)	

Rank	Men's	Ref.
1st place, gold medalist(s)	Ranran Abdilla and Rancel Varga (HARBOR Pilot)	
2nd place, silver medalist(s)	Pol Salvador and Alex Iraya (NU)	
3rd place, bronze medalist(s)	Chye Tan and Alex Ramos (Milktea Network)	

=== Sipalay, Negros Occidental ===
- Date: June 24–25, 2023
- Location: Poblacion Beach, City of Sipalay, Negros Occidental

Final standings

Rank	Women's	Ref.
1st place, gold medalist(s)	Honey Grace Cordero and Roma Joy Doromal (Grass to Bone)	
2nd place, silver medalist(s)	Bea Tan and Jennifer Cosas (Abanse Negrense)	
3rd place, bronze medalist(s)	Gelimae Villanueva and Kyla Gallego (UNO-R)	

Rank	Men's	Ref.
1st place, gold medalist(s)	Ranran Abdilla and Rancel Varga (HARBOR Pilot)	
2nd place, silver medalist(s)	Toto de Pedro and Eljhay Ronquillo (Abanse Negrense)	
3rd place, bronze medalist(s)	Amil Pacinio and Jian Salarzon (Ateneo)	

== 2024 Nationwide Tour ==
=== Summer kick-off tournament ===
- Date: April 13, 2024
- Location: Seafront Residences, San Juan, Batangas

Final standings

Rank	Women's	Ref.
1st place, gold medalist(s)	Melody Pons and Sheena Cafe (FEU)	
2nd place, silver medalist(s)	Gena Hora and Euri Eslapor (Katipunera)	
3rd place, bronze medalist(s)	Frenchie Premaylon and Love Lopez (FEU)	

Rank	Men's	Ref.
1st place, gold medalist(s)	Johnwayne Dionela and Rain Skyler Gemarino (NU)	
2nd place, silver medalist(s)	Kevin Ondevilla and Rocky Motol (DLS-CSB)	
3rd place, bronze medalist(s)	Kyle Retiza and Reynan Postorioso (FEU)	

== See also ==
- Perlas Spikers
