= Bersola =

Bersola is a Filipino surname. Notable people with the surname include:

- Christine Bersola-Babao (born 1970), Filipino journalist
- Kathy Bersola (born 1996), Filipino volleyball player
