= Joy Dacoron =

Filipina volleyball player

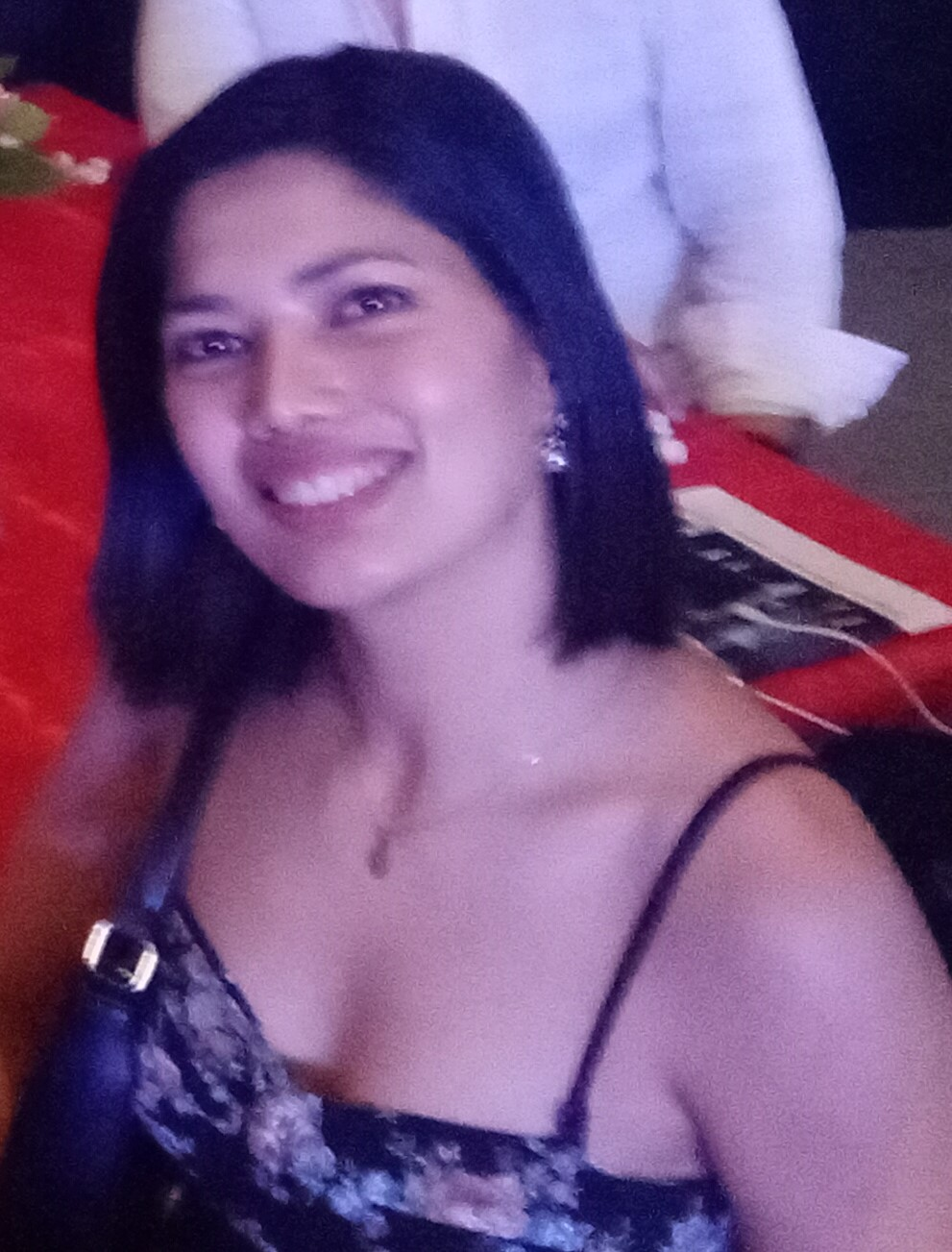
- Dacoron at Adamson alumni awards, February 2024

Personal information
- Full name: Mary Joy Capocong Dacoron
- Born: October 11, 1995 (age 31)
- Hometown: Cebu
- Height: 178 cm (5 ft 10 in)
- Weight: 61 kg (134 lb)
- Education: Adamson University

Volleyball information
- Position: Middle blocker

Mary Joy Capocong Dacoron (born October 11, 1995) is a Filipino professional volleyball player who last played for the Petro Gazz Angels of the Premier Volleyball League (PVL).

She played four years as middle blocker for the Adamson Lady Falcons in the University Athletic Association of the Philippines (UAAP) and was included in the top 40 official Binibining Pilipinas candidates for a year.

== Personal life ==
Dacoron grew up in Balamban, Cebu.

== Career ==
Dacoron played for the Lady Falcons from 2016 to 2019. She would later join her alma mater's faculty after finishing undergraduate and MBA studies and earning some PhD units.

As a professional athlete, Dacoron played for the Sta. Lucia Lady Realtors, BanKo Perlas Spikers, Chery Tiggo 7 Pro Crossovers, Cignal HD Spikers, F2 Logistics Cargo Movers, and Petro Gazz Angels.

Dacoron won the PVL 2nd Best Middle Blocker award in 2018.

== Awards ==
=== Club ===
Year	Season	Award	Ref
2024-25 PVL		Champion	

=== Individual ===
Year	Season	Award	Ref
2018 PVL		2nd Best Middle Blocker	
