= 2026 Premier Volleyball League season =

The 2026 Premier Volleyball League season may refer to:

- 2025–26 Premier Volleyball League season, held during the first half of 2026
- 2026–27 Premier Volleyball League season, held during the second half of 2026
