= Sisi Rondina =

Filipino volleyball player (born 1996)

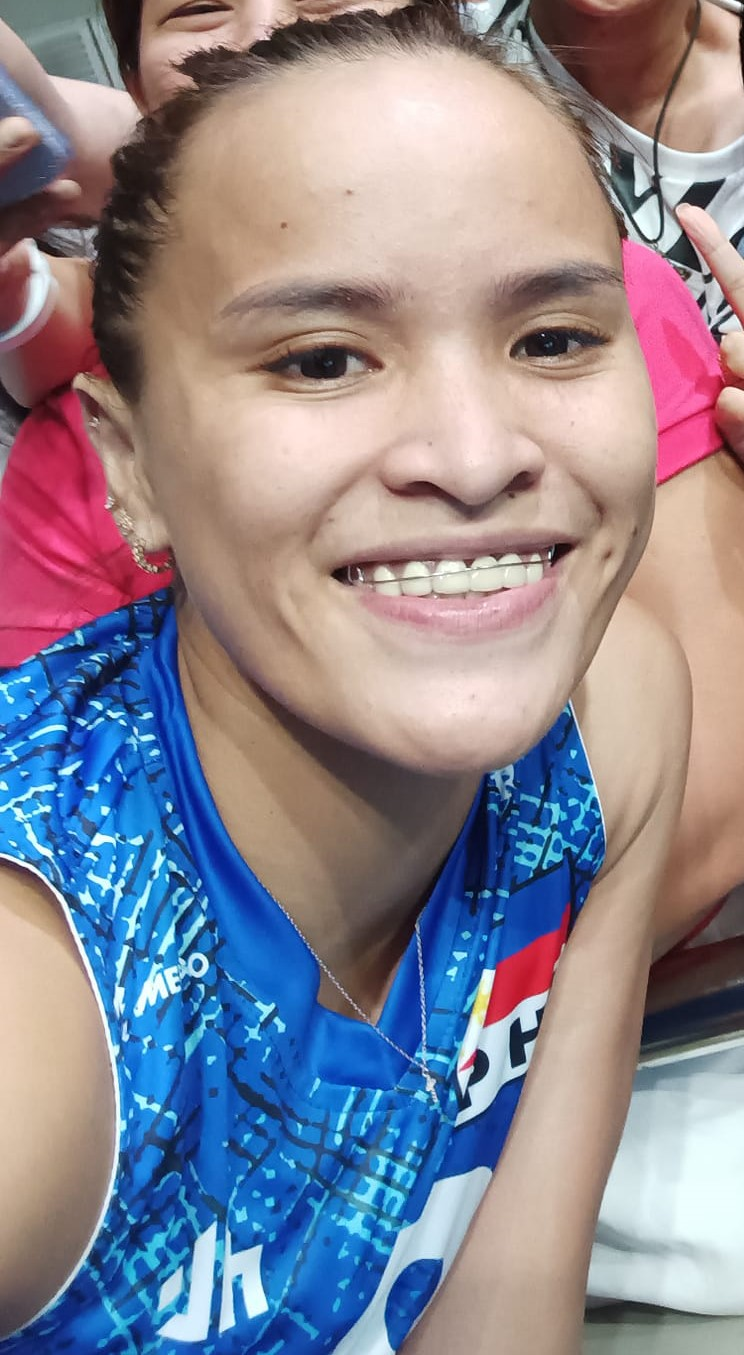
- Rondina in 2024

Personal information
- Nickname: Sisi
- Nationality: Filipino
- Born: Cherry Ann Quipanes Rondina Rosales; September 4, 1996 (age 30); Cebu City, Philippines
- Hometown: Compostela, Cebu
- Height: 1.66 m (5 ft 5 in)
- Weight: 55 kg (121 lb)
- Spike: 296 cm (117 in)
- Block: 284 cm (112 in)
- Education: University of Santo Tomas

Beach volleyball information
Years	Teammate
2018–2019; 2019–2022; 2022–2023; 2025	Dzi Gervacio; Bernadeth Pons; Jovelyn Gonzaga; Bernadeth Pons

Indoor volleyball information
- Position: Outside Hitter
- Current club: Choco Mucho Flying Titans
- Number: 18

Career
Years	Teams
2016	Foton Tornadoes
2017–2019	Petron Blaze Spikers
2020–2021	Creamline Beach Volleyball Team
2023–present	Choco Mucho Flying Titans

National team
2018–2023	Philippines beach
2024–present	Philippines indoor
Honours
Women's indoor volleyball
Representing Philippines
Asian Challenge Cup
Bronze medal – third place	2024 Manila	Team
SEA V.League
Bronze medal – third place	2024 Vĩnh Phúc	Leg 1
Bronze medal – third place	2024 Nakhon Ratchasima	Leg 2
Women's beach volleyball
Representing Philippines
FIVB Beach Volleyball World Tour
Gold medal – first place	2022 Subic Bay Future	Women's Beach
Southeast Asian Games
Gold medal – first place	2025 Thailand	Women's beach
Bronze medal – third place	2019 Philippines	Women's beach
Bronze medal – third place	2021 Vietnam	Women's beach

Cherry Ann "Sisi" Quipanes Rondina Rosales (born September 4, 1996) is a Filipino indoor and beach volleyball player. She is currently playing for the Choco Mucho Flying Titans at the Premier Volleyball League.

She was a former member and captain of the UST Golden Tigresses volleyball team. She is a 4-time UAAP Beach Volleyball MVP and the UAAP Season 81 Women's Volleyball MVP and Athlete of the Year. She is a current member of the Philippines Women Beach Volleyball team.

== Early life ==
Rondina was born on September 4, 1996, in Cebu City, to Alona, a dressmaker, and Arnold Rondina, a fisherman and driver. She has three sisters. She grew up in her hometown of Compostela, Cebu.

She graduated from the University of Santo Tomas with a degree in Physical Education in 2019.

== Career ==
=== Early career ===
Rondina first found her love for sports in track and field, in which she would usually grace the sands of the beach near her home. It was only in her 3rd grade in elementary when she first held a volleyball on her hands with her mother. The next day, a tryout was held in her town and she decided to join.

Rondina continued to develop her skills and prowess in volleyball until she became a varsity player of her highschool's team. She represented Central Visayas at the different editions of Palarong Pambansa, where she was first discovered by the UST recruitment staff. Eventually, she won the 2013 Palarong Pambansa Best Attacker individual award.

=== Collegiate ===
Rondina started representing the University of Santo Tomas in UAAP Season 77, playing in beach volleyball to which she won the championship and bagged the MVP award. She debuted in indoor volleyball in UAAP Season 77.

In Season 78, Rondina-Rivera tandem failed to defend their crown in UAAP Beach Volleyball Tournament. The indoor team was unable to make it into Final 4.

After a disappointing season, Rondina reclaims the UAAP Season 79 Beach Volleyball title together with her new partner, Jem Nicole Gutierrez. She bagged her 2nd Most Valuable Award in the UAAP Beach Volleyball Tournament. She and UST Tigresses made their Final 4 comeback in UAAP Season 79 with 9–5 win–loss record UST failed to advance to Finals bowing down to defending champion De La Salle Lady Spikers in the semifinals.

Rondina and her new partner Caitlin Viray swept the UAAP Season 80 Beach Volleyball tournament, successfully defended their crown. She also got her 3rd Most Valuable Player award for the season. UST Tigresses fails to advance in the Final 4 of UAAP Season 80 women's volleyball tournament. Rondina bagged the Best Scorer award.

In UAAP Season 81, Rondina and rookie Baby Love Barbon brought UST's 6th Beach Volleyball Championship title, making it as the winningest team in the UAAP Beach Volleyball Tournament. Rondina got her 4th Most Valuable Award.

UST"s Skipper Rondina led her team into 10–4 win–loss record in the elimination round of UAAP Season 81 women's volleyball tournament, the team's best record since UAAP Season 73. UST Tigresses won over De La Salle Lady Spikers in playoffs and semi-finals and sent UST to its first Finals appearance after 7-year drought. Rondina emerged as the Most Valuable Player of Season 81, also bagged the 2nd Best Open Hitter and Best Scorer awards.

During the closing and awarding UAAP ceremonies conducted at the Mall of Asia Arena, the board awarded Rondina as Athlete of the Year for the collegiate team sports category. She was the only female athlete to be given the award for season 81.

=== Professional ===
Rondina and Bernadeth Pons of Petron Sprint 4T won the championship of the 2017 Philippine SuperLiga Beach Challenge Cup and Rondina was awarded the Most Valuable Player. With the Petron Blaze Spikers, she won the 2017 PSL All-Filipino Conference gold medal and the 2017 PSL Grand Prix Conference silver medal.

The Rondina-Pons tandem successfully defended their title for Petron in the 2018 Philippine Super Liga Beach Challenge Cup.

In 2018, Rondina alongside Dzi Gervacio represented the Philippines in the 2018 FIVB Beach Volleyball World Tour Manila Open and made it into the quarterfinals.

In 2019, the tandem of Rondina-Pons was one the representatives of the Philippines in the 2019 Southeast Asian Games Beach Volleyball Tournament where they won bronze together with Dzi Gervacio and Dij Rodriguez and 2019 FIVB Beach Volleyball World Tour Boracay Open.

== Personal life ==
Rondina married volleyball player Ronniel Rosales at a church ceremony in Tiaong, Quezon on June 20, 2026.

== Clubs ==
- (Philippines) Foton Tornadoes (2016)
- (Philippines) Petron Blaze Spikers (2017–2019)
- (Philippines) Creamline Beach Volleyball Team (2020–2021)
- (Philippines) Choco Mucho Flying Titans (2023–present)

== Awards ==
=== Indoor volleyball ===
==== Individual ====
- 2013 Palarong Pambansa - Indoor Volleyball "Best Attacker”
- 2013 Mayors Cup - Indoor Volleyball "Best Attacker"
- 2014 Mayors Cup - Indoor Volleyball "Best Attacker"
- 2014 Mayors Cup - Indoor Volleyball "Most Valuable Player"
- 2014 Central Visayas Regional Athletic Association - Indoor Volleyball "Best Attacker"
- 2018 UAAP Season 80 Seniors Indoor Volleyball "Best scorer"
- 2018 Philippine Super Liga Invitational Cup Conference "Second Best Outside Spiker"
- 2019 UAAP Season 81 Seniors Indoor Volleyball "Most valuable player"
- 2019 UAAP Season 81 Seniors Indoor Volleyball "Second Best Outside Spiker"
- 2019 UAAP Season 81 Seniors "Athlete of the Year" for the Team Sports category
- 2019 Philippine Super Liga All-Filipino Conference “2nd Best Outside Spiker”
- 2019 Philippine Super Liga Invitational Cup Conference “1st Best Outside Spiker”
- 2019 Philippine Super Liga Invitational Cup Conference “Best Scorer”
- 2023 VTV International Women's Volleyball Cup “Best Outside Spiker”
- 2023 Premier Volleyball League Second All-Filipino Conference "Most valuable player"
- 2024 Premier Volleyball League All-Filipino Conference "1st Best Outside Spiker"

==== Collegiate ====
- 2016 Philippine University Games Indoor Volleyball – Champion, with UST Golden Tigresses
- 2017 UAAP Season 79 Seniors Indoor Volleyball – Bronze medal, with UST Golden Tigresses
- 2017 Philippine University Games Indoor Volleyball - Champion, with UST Golden Tigresses
- 2018 Philippine University Games Indoor Volleyball – Champion, with UST Golden Tigresses
- 2019 UAAP Season 81 Seniors Indoor Volleyball – Silver medal, with UST Golden Tigresses

==== Club ====
- 2016 Philippine Super Liga All-Filipino Conference – Silver medal, with Foton Tornadoes
- 2016 Philippine SuperLiga Grand Prix Conference – Champion, with Foton Tornadoes
- 2017 Philippine SuperLiga All-Filipino Conference – Champion, with Petron Blaze Spikers
- 2017 Philippine SuperLiga Grand Prix Conference – Silver medal, with Petron Blaze Spikers
- 2023 VTV International Women's Volleyball Cup – Bronze medal, with Choco Mucho Flying Titans
- 2023 Premier Volleyball League Second All-Filipino Conference – Silver medal, with Choco Mucho Flying Titans
- 2024 Premier Volleyball League All-Filipino Conference – Silver medal, with Choco Mucho Flying Titans

==== National team ====
Representing Philippines

- 2024 Asian Women's Volleyball Challenge Cup – Bronze medal
- 2024 SEA Women's V.League – First Leg – Bronze medal
- 2024 SEA Women's V.League – Second Leg – Bronze medal

=== Beach volleyball ===
==== Individual ====
- 2014 UAAP Season 77 Seniors Beach Volleyball "Most valuable player"
- 2016 UAAP Season 79 Seniors Beach Volleyball "Most valuable player"
- 2017 Philippine Super Liga Beach Volleyball Challenge Cup "Most valuable player"
- 2017 UAAP Season 80 Seniors Beach Volleyball "Most valuable player"
- 2018 UAAP Season 81 Seniors Beach Volleyball "Most valuable player"

==== Collegiate ====
- 2015 Queen of Sands Beach Volleyball Tournament – Bronze medal, with UST Golden Tigresses
- 2015 Ibalong Festival Beach Volleyball Open Conference – Champion, with UST Golden Tigresses
- 2015 Nestea Beach Intercollegiate Volleyball Competition – Champion, with UST Golden Tigresses
- 2016 Nestea Beach Intercollegiate Volleyball Competition – Champion, with UST Golden Tigresses
- 2014 UAAP Season 77 Seniors Beach Volleyball – Champion, with UST Golden Tigresses
- 2016 UAAP Season 79 Seniors Beach Volleyball – Champion, with UST Golden Tigresses
- 2017 UAAP Season 80 Seniors Beach Volleyball – Champion, with UST Golden Tigresses
- 2018 UAAP Season 81 Seniors Beach Volleyball – Champion, with UST Golden Tigresses

==== Club ====
- 2016 Philippine SuperLiga Beach Volleyball Challenge Cup – Silver medal, with Foton Tornadoes
- 2017 Philippine SuperLiga Beach Volleyball Challenge Cup – Champion, with Petron Sprint 4T
- 2018 PSL Beach Volleyball Challenge Cup – Champion, with Petron XCS
- 2018 Ibalong Festival Beach Volleyball Open Conference – Champion, with Petron

==== National team ====
Representing Philippines

- 2019 Southeast Asian Games, Beach Volleyball - Subic – Bronze medal
- 2021 Southeast Asian Games, Beach Volleyball - Quảng Ninh – Bronze medal
- 2021 Australian Beach Volleyball Tour - Women's Elite Division – Silver medal
- 2025 Southeast Asian Games, Beach Volleyball - Chonburi – Champion

===== Pro Beach Tour =====
- 1 medal – (1 gold)

No.	Result	Date	Category	Venue	Partner	Opponents	Score		
1.	Gold	11 Dec 2022	Future	Olongapo (Subic Bay), Philippines	Jovelyn Gonzaga	(Philippines) Rodriguez / Eslapor	22–24	21–12	15–12

== In popular media ==
In 2019, actress Kim Chiu portrayed Rondina's life story in Maalaala Mo Kaya's episode entitled MVP which was aired last July 20, 2019.
