= Perlas Spikers =

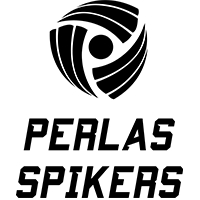
- Full name: Perlas Spikers
- Short name: Perlas
- Nickname: Perlas Spikers
- Founded: 2017
- Dissolved: 2021
- League: Premier Volleyball League

Uniforms
Home	Away

The Perlas Spikers, also earlier known as the BanKo Perlas Spikers, were a professional women's volleyball team playing in the Premier Volleyball League. The team was owned by the Beach Volleyball Republic.

== History ==
The team debuted in the 2017 season of the Premier Volleyball League (PVL).

On January 12, 2022, the team announced it was taking a leave of absence from the 2022 PVL Open Conference due to the ongoing COVID-19 pandemic.

== Name changes ==
- Perlas Spikers (2017 Reinforced Conference, 2021 Open Conference)
- BanKo Perlas Spikers (2017 Open Conference – 2019 Open Conference)

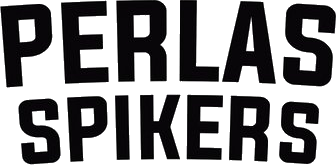
This logo has been used since the team debuted. However, it was replaced in 2021.

== Final rosters ==
Perlas Spikers
Number	Player	Position	Height	Date of birth
1	Cherry Rose Nunag	Middle Blocker	1.80 m (5 ft 11 in)	October 22, 1992 (age 33)
2	Cherilyn Jhane Sindayen	Outside Hitter	1.64 m (5 ft 5 in)	August 11, 1996 (age 29)
3	Suzanne Roces	Opposite Hitter	1.78 m (5 ft 10 in)	January 17, 1985 (age 40)
4	Heather Anne Guino-o	Outside Hitter	1.70 m (5 ft 7 in)	November 27, 1997 (age 27)
6	Roma Joy Doromal	Opposite Hitter	1.72 m (5 ft 8 in)	November 23, 1997 (age 27)
7	Jellie Tempiatura	Libero	1.57 m (5 ft 2 in)	July 24, 1997 (age 28)
9	Michelle Katherine Morente	Outside Hitter	1.67 m (5 ft 6 in)	November 14, 1995 (age 29)
11	Maria Angelica Cayuna	Setter	1.68 m (5 ft 6 in)	August 17, 1998 (age 27)
12	Jamenea Ferrer (C)	Setter	1.57 m (5 ft 2 in)	December 12, 1991 (age 33)
13	Jhoana Louisse Maraguinot	Outside Hitter	1.73 m (5 ft 8 in)	January 26, 1996 (age 29)
14	Tonnie Rose Ponce	Libero	1.57 m (5 ft 2 in)	October 31, 1998 (age 26)
16	Czarina Grace Carandang	Middle Blocker	1.78 m (5 ft 10 in)	November 26, 1997 (age 27)
16	Jeanette Virginia Villareal	Middle Blocker		
19	Nicole Anne Tiamzon	Outside Hitter	1.68 m (5 ft 6 in)	November 3, 1995 (age 29)

Coaching staff

- Head coach:
  Reynaldo Diaz Jr.
- Assistant coach:
  Manolo Refugia Jr.
  Michelle Carolino

Team staff

- Team manager:
  Rye Sordan
- Team utility:

Medical staff

- Team physician:
- Physical therapist:
  Marilou Regidor

== Honors ==
=== Team ===
Local

Season	Conference	Title	Source
2017	Reinforced	5th place	
2017	Open	5th place	
2018	Reinforced	3rd place	
2018	Open	3rd place	
2019	Reinforced	4th place	
2019	Open	3rd place	
2021	Open	9th place	

International

Season	Tournament	Title	Country	Ref.
2018	Vinh Long Television Cup	3rd place	Vietnam	

=== Individual ===
Season	Conference	Award	Name	Source
2018	Reinforced	2nd Best Middle Blocker	(Philippines) Mary Joy Dacoron	
2018	Reinforced	Most Points Scored	(United States) Lakia Bright	
2018	Open	2nd Best Middle Blocker	(Philippines) Kathy Bersola	
2019	Reinforced	2nd Best Outside Spiker	(Philippines) Nicole Tiamzon	
2019	Reinforced	1st Best Middle Blocker	(Philippines) Kathy Bersola	
2019	Reinforced	Best Opposite Spiker	(Philippines) Dzi Gervacio	
2019	Open	1st Best Middle Blocker	(Philippines) Kathy Bersola	

== Imports ==
Season	Number	Player	Country
2017	15	Rupia Inck	Brazil
2017	17	Naoko Hashimoto	Japan
2018	10	Jutarat Montripila	Thailand
2018	15	Lakia Jamiah Bright	United States
2019
2019	14	Sutadta Chuewulim	Thailand
2019	15	Lakia Jamiah Bright (replaced) (Note: Chuewulim replaced Bright.)	United States
2019	18	Yasemin Sahin Yildirim (replaced) (Note: Yildirim was replaced by Horton during the semis.)	Turkey
2019	21	Jeane Mae Horton	United States

== Team captains ==
- (Philippines) Dzi Gervacio (2017)
- (Philippines) Sue Roces (2017 – 2018)
- (Philippines) Nicole Anne Tiamzon (2019)
- (Philippines) Jamenea Ferrer (2021)

== Coaches ==
- (Philippines) Jerry Yee (2017 Reinforced Conference)
- (Thailand) Nai Muhhamed (2017 Open Conference)
- (Philippines) Ariel dela Cruz (2018 Reinforced Conference – 2018 Open Conference)
- (Thailand) Apichat Kongsawat (2019 Reinforced Conference)
- (Philippines) Reynaldo Diaz Jr. (2021 Open Conference)

== Notable players ==
Local players

- Amy Ahomiro
- Kathy Bersola
- Tots Carlos
- Ella de Jesus
- Jamenea Ferrer
- Dzi Gervacio
- Cherry Nunag
- Nicole Tiamzon

Foreign players

Brazil

- Rupia Inck

Japan

- Naoko Hashimoto

Thailand

- Jutarat Montripila
- Sutadta Chuewulim

Turkey

- Yasemin Sahin Yildirim

United States

- Lakia Jamiah Bright
- Jeane Mae Horton

== See also ==
- Beach Volleyball Republic
- Beach Volleyball Republic results
