= Nicole Tiamzon =

Filipino volleyball player

Personal information
- Full name: Nicole Anne Zapanta Tiamzon
- Nickname: Nics, Tiammy
- Nationality: Filipino
- Born: November 3, 1995 (age 30); Cainta, Rizal, Philippines
- Hometown: Taytay, Rizal
- Height: 1.68 m (5 ft 6 in)
- Education: University of the Philippines-Diliman

Volleyball information
- Position: Outside hitter
- Current club: Nxled Chameleons

Career
Years	Teams
2015	Foton Tornadoes
2017–2021	Perlas Spikers
2022–2025	Petro Gazz Angels
2026–present	Nxled Chameleons

Nicole Anne Zapanta Tiamzon (born November 3, 1995) is a Filipina professional volleyball player for the Nxled Chameleons of the Premier Volleyball League (PVL).

== Early life and education ==
Born on November 3, 1995 in Cainta, Rizal, Nicole Tiamzon started playing when she was 10, and started competing in her second year of high school in Siena College of Taytay. She tried out for the Lady Maroons volleyball team of the University of the Philippines and got accepted. She graduated with a degree in Sports Science.

== Advocacy ==
Tiamzon founded the Spike and Serve in 2017, a non-profit grassroots volleyball development program where they teach the underprivileged kids to play volleyball, and organizing community-based leagues where they can compete.

== Awards ==
=== Individual ===
- 2019 Premier Volleyball League Reinforced Conference "1st Best Outside Spiker"

=== Club ===
- 2018 Premier Volleyball League Reinforced Conference - Bronze medal, with BanKo Perlas Spikers
- 2018 Premier Volleyball League Open Conference - Bronze medal, with BanKo Perlas Spikers
- 2018 Vietnam Vinh Long Television Cup - Bronze medal, with the BanKo Perlas Spikers
- 2019 Premier Volleyball League Open Conference - Bronze medal, with BanKo Perlas Spikers
- 2022 Premier Volleyball League Open Conference - Silver medal, with Petro Gazz Angels
- 2022 Premier Volleyball League Reinforced Conference - Gold medal, with Petro Gazz Angels
- 2023 Premier Volleyball League First All-Filipino Conference - Silver medal, with Petro Gazz Angels
- 2024 PNVF Champions League for Women - Gold medal, with Petro Gazz Angels
- 2024–25 Premier Volleyball League All-Filipino Conference - Gold medal, with Petro Gazz Angels
