= Dzi Gervacio =

Filipino volleyball player

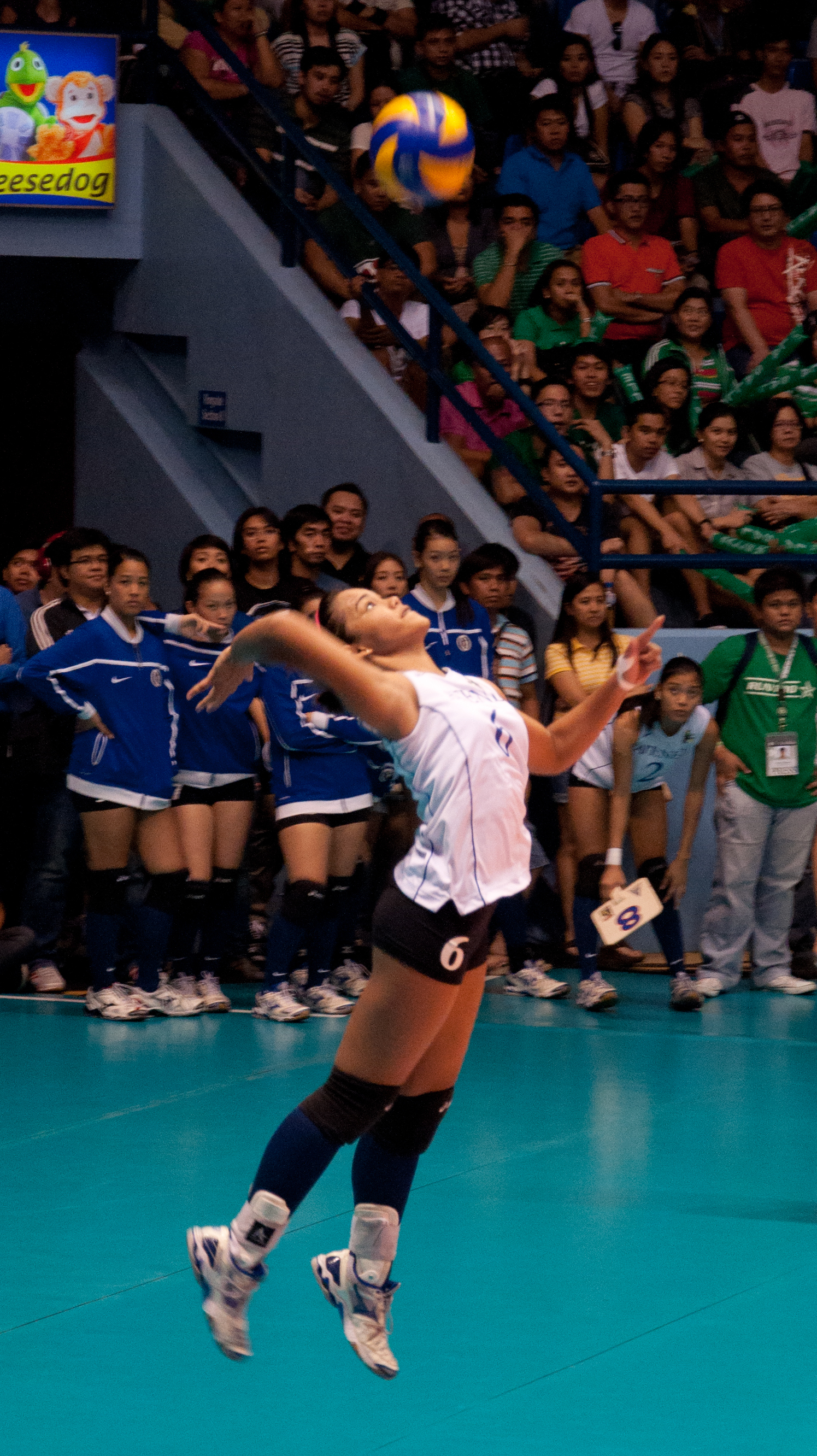

Personal information
- Full name: Angeline Marie Gervacio
- Nickname: Dzi
- Nationality: Filipino
- Born: December 30, 1991 (age 34)
- Height: 5 ft 7 in (1.70 m)
- Weight: 64 kg (141 lb)
- Education: Ateneo de Manila University

Volleyball information
- Position: Opposite hitter

Career
Years	Teams
2014–2015	Foton Tornadoes
2016	BaliPure Purest Water Defenders
2017–2019	Perlas Spikers
2021	Creamline Cool Smashers (beach)
2022	F2 Logistics Cargo Movers
2023–2025	Petro Gazz Angels
Honours
Women's beach volleyball
Representing Philippines
Southeast Asian Games
Bronze medal – third place	2019 Subic	Women's Beach

Angeline Marie Gervacio, also known as Dzi Gervacio, is a Filipino former professional volleyball player. She is a former Ateneo Lady Eagles player and is the team manager for the Nxled Chameleons. She is known as the Queen of Jump Serve.

== Early life and education ==
Gervacio attended St. Scholastica's College, Manila and Ateneo de Manila University.

== Career ==
Gervacio won the WNCAA Juniors Division Best Attacker award in 2006 and 2007. After completing her undergraduate studies at the Ateneo de Manila University and her UAAP career in March 2013, ending the Fab 5 era, Gervacio began her law studies at the same university.

On October 22, 2014, Gervacio joined Foton Tornadoes in the 2014 Grand Prix conference of the Philippine Super Liga (PSL) as a last-minute replacement for the injured attacker Joey Torrijos. She clarified that her participation with the Tornadoes would limited expected to miss some games as the tournament progresses because of her school schedule. During the 2015 PSL All-Filipino Conference, Gervacio suffered an injury in her left knee and taken to the Makati Medical Center while playing for Foton against Philips Gold. Later she was diagnosed through MRI that she had a displaced patella and suffered an anterior cruciate ligament injury. She returned to play the Shakey's V-League 13th Season Open Conference with BaliPure Purest Water Defenders.

In 2021, Gervacio decided to focus on beach volleyball joining the Creamline Cool Smashers. In January of the following year, she returned to indoor volleyball joining the F2 Logistics Cargo Movers in the Premier Volleyball League (PVL).

In 2021, Gervacio became director of the Far Eastern University's volleyball program, continuing to serve in the position despite retiring from playing volleyball in 2024. Under her directorship, both the FEU Tamaraws and Lady Tamaraws reached the semifinals of the UAAP Season 86 volleyball tournaments.

== Clubs ==
- (Philippines) Foton Tornadoes (2014–2015)
- (Philippines) BaliPure Purest Water Defenders (2016)
- (Philippines) Perlas Spikers (2017–2019)
- (Philippines) Creamline Cool Smashers (2021; beach volleyball)
- (Philippines) F2 Logistics Cargo Movers (2022–2023)
- (Philippines) Petro Gazz Angels (2023–2025)

== Awards ==
=== Individual ===
- 2006 WNCAA Juniors Girls' Volleyball "Best attacker"
- 2007 WNCAA Juniors Girls' Volleyball "Best attacker"
- 2019 Premier Volleyball League Reinforced Conference "Best opposite spiker"

=== National team ===
- 2019 Southeast Asian Games - Beach Volleyball – Bronze medal, with Cherry Ann Rondina

=== Club ===
- 2016 Shakey's V-League 13th Season Open Conference – Bronze medal, with BaliPure Purest Water Defenders
- 2016 Shakey's V-League 13th Season Reinforced Open Conference - Bronze medal, with BaliPure Purest Water Defenders
- 2018 Premier Volleyball League Reinforced Conference – Bronze medal, with Perlas Spikers
- 2018 Premier Volleyball League Open Conference – Bronze medal, with Perlas Spikers
- 2019 Premier Volleyball League Open Conference – Bronze medal, with Perlas Spikers
