= Kathy Bersola =

Filipino volleyball athlete

Personal information
- Full name: Katherine Adrielle Reyes Bersola
- Nationality: Filipino
- Born: March 18, 1996 (age 30)
- Hometown: Parañaque, Metro Manila, Philippines
- Height: 5 ft 11 in (1.80 m)
- Weight: 61.5 kg (136 lb)
- Education: University of the Philippines Diliman

Volleyball information
- Position: Middle Blocker
- Current team: Perlas Spikers
- Number: 7

Career
Years	Teams
2012–2017	University of the Philippines
2017–2021	Perlas Spikers

Katherine Adrielle "Kathy" Reyes Bersola (born March 18, 1996) is a Filipino volleyball athlete. She played with the University of the Philippines - UP Lady Maroons Volleyball Team. Bersola holds a degree in Sports Science with summa cum laude honors from UP Diliman and later admitted at UP College of Medicine.

== Career ==
Bersola played with UP Lady Maroons Volleyball Team from UAAP Season 75 to UAAP Season 79, being team captain of the UP Lady Maroons Volleyball Team for UAAP Season 78.

Bersola finished with an average of 1.18 and graduated in 2017 with a degree of Bachelor of Sports Science from the College of Human Kinetics in the University of the Philippines. She is among that year's 36 summa cum laude graduates from the institution. University of the Philippines Lady Fighting Maroon volleybelle is the first summa cum laude graduate from the College of Human Kinetics. She was selected ABS-CBN Sports Player of the Week on March 27, 2017, and Philips Gold–PVL Press Corps Player of the Week on July 24, 2017.

She has been a doctor of medicine (MD) since 2022.

== Clubs ==
- (Philippines) Perlas Spikers (2017–2021)

== Awards ==
=== Individual ===
- UAAP Season 76 "Best Middle Blocker"
- 2015 Shakey's V-League Season 12 Reinforced "1st Best Middle Blocker"
- 2016 Shakey's V-League Season 13 Open Conference "2nd Best Middle Blocker"
- 2018 Premier Volleyball League Open Conference "2nd Best Middle Blocker"
- 2019 Premier Volleyball League Reinforced Conference "1st Best Middle Blocker"
- 2019 Premier Volleyball League Open Conference "1st Best Middle Blocker"

=== Collegiate ===
- 2015 Shakey's V-League Reinforced Conference – Bronze medal, with the UP Lady Maroons
- 2016 Shakey's V-League Collegiate Conference – Bronze medal, with the UP Lady Maroons

=== Club ===
- 2018 Premier Volleyball League Open Conference - Bronze medal, with the BanKo Perlas Spikers
- 2018 Vietnam Vinh Long Television Cup - Bronze medal, with the BanKo Perlas Spikers
- 2019 Premier Volleyball League Open Conference - Bronze medal, with the BanKo Perlas Spikers
