= Premier Volleyball League =

Women's volleyball league in the Philippines

- Current season, competition or edition: 2026–27 Premier Volleyball League All-Filipino Conference
- Formerly: Shakey's V-League
- Sport: Volleyball
- Founded: 2017; 9 years ago
- Founder: Jun Bernardino; Moying Martelino; Ricky Palou
- First season: 2017
- Director: Sherwin Malonzo
- Motto: The Heart of Volleyball
- No. of teams: 9
- Country: Philippines
- Venues: Filoil Centre; Philsports Arena; SM Mall of Asia Arena; Smart Araneta Coliseum
- Continent: AVC (Asia)
- Most recent champion: Est Cola (2026 Invitational)
- Most titles: Creamline (11 titles)
- Broadcasters: One Sports; One Sports+
- Streaming partners: Cignal Play; One Sports YouTube Channel
- International cup: AVC Women's Volleyball Champions League
- Website: pvl.ph

The Premier Volleyball League (PVL) is the top-level professional women's volleyball league in the Philippines organized by the Sports Vision Management Group, Inc. The PVL was established in 2004 as the inter-collegiate Shakey's V-League (SVL) until it rebranded to the current entity in 2017. Prior to becoming a full-fledged professional league in 2021, the PVL was open to participation of commercial owned semi-professional clubs and non-collegiate teams backed by local governments.

The PVL previously operated men's and collegiate divisions before they were spun-off into Spikers' Turf and the V-League, respectively, both are also operated by Sports Vision.

The Creamline Cool Smashers are the most successful team with eleven titles, which included the league's only Grand Slam in the 2024 season.

== History ==
=== 2004–2016: Shakey's V-League ===
The Premier Volleyball League was established in 2004 as the Shakey's V-League. The league was founded by Sports Vision Management Group, Inc., a group led by former Philippine Basketball Association commissioner Jun Bernardino, Ricky Palou, Moying Martelino and Rhea Navarro, with Shakey's Pizza serving as the title sponsor throughout the lifetime of the SVL. Initially an inter-collegiate women's league, it expanded to include commercial teams beginning in 2011.

=== 2017–2020: Premier Volleyball League, professional status and hiatus ===
The Shakey's V-League changed its name to the Premier Volleyball League (PVL) starting the 2017 season. The Spikers' Turf, which was spun-off from the league in 2015, was merged back to the PVL and was rebranded as the PVL's men's division. The renaming was part of a bid to secure more sponsorship for the league. There was a plan to rename the league to the Philippine Volleyball League instead but this was abandoned due to another entity already owning the name. The order of its conference was also changed with the league beginning with the import-laden Reinforced Conference and the Open Conference being held close to the start of the UAAP and NCAA tournaments which is usually held near the year's end. Prior to this, the Open Conference was traditionally held earlier.

The PVL men's division ended with the 2018 PVL Collegiate Conference as its final tournament. The men's division reverted to the Spikers' Turf. The first tournament since the revert was the Open Conference in October 2018.

The 2020 season was indefinitely postponed due to the COVID-19 pandemic and there were plans to start the season with the Open Conference instead of the Reinforced Conference in September 2020 due to logistics issue of flying in imports for the latter.

In October 2020, the Philippines' Games and Amusements Board (GAB) issued a directive that players compensated for non-national team play would be considered as professionals, as well as all sporting events organized for profit. This has raised concerns regarding the status of leagues such as the PVL and its rival league, the Philippine Super Liga (PSL). The PVL in particular was concerned over the financial aspects of operating as a professional league.

In November 2020, the PVL announced that the league would turn professional starting with the 2021 season, believing it has enough women players to make the move. The league was already considering move for some time due to the collegiate league UAAP deciding to bar its rookies from playing in commercial leagues starting its UAAP Season 81 (2018-19) in anticipation that all college players would not be allowed to play in the PVL eventually. Prior to the league's professionalization, the PVL was considered as semi-professional and thus, its affairs were not supervised or regulated by the GAB. Six PVL teams—BaliPure, Banko Perlas, Choco Mucho, Creamline, Motolite, and Petro Gazz—agreed to the move of the PVL turning professional.

A new separate league called the V-League, was formed to accommodate collegiate and amateur teams which could no longer participate in the PVL due to the league's professionalization. Prior to its professionalization, the PVL hosted a collegiate conference.

=== 2021–2023: Return of the league and further expansion ===
Prior to the start of the 2021 season, five PSL teams—Chery Tiggo, Cignal HD, F2 Logistics, PLDT, and Sta. Lucia—joined the PVL, which rendered the PVL a "unified" professional league, leaving the PSL with only three inactive member teams.

The PVL returned in 2021 with the 2021 Open Conference, which was staged in a bubble set-up. The recurrence of an entire season began the following year. In October 2022, PVL announced the use of video challenge system for the first time in the return of the Reinforced Conference after three years.

The 2023 season saw the rebranding of the Open Conference as the All-Filipino Conference to better reflect that only Filipino players could compete in said conference. After the All-Filipino Conference, the league saw the addition of two new teams in Farm Fresh Foxies and Quezon City Gerflor Defenders, and the reappearance of Foton Tornadoes in the Filipino volleyball scene. The three teams pledged to participate in the league for at least the next three years. With the inclusion of three new teams comes with the skipping of Philippine Army Lady Troopers from joining the league due to military training to most of its players. Foton withdrew shortly after their participation in Invitational Conference because some of its players didn't get a contract renewal and they returned to the franchise's main team, the Chery Tiggo. F2 Logistics and Gerflor Defenders were disbanded after the 2023 season.

=== 2024–present: Integration with PNVF and international volleyball ===
During the 2024–25 season, two new established teams joined the All-Filipino Conference namely Strong Group Athletics (now called as Zus Coffee Thunderbelles), who took over the Gerflor Defenders franchise, and Capital1 Solar Spikers. This 2024 season also saw the commencement of the league's inaugural rookie draft which aimed to enhance the league’s competitive balance of all the teams.

The 2024–25 season also marked the start of the league's transition to a June-to-May calendar as part of its integration with the FIVB calendar. The season featured a second All-Filipino Conference that would mark this transition. In January 2026, control committee chairman Sherwin Malonzo, clarified and confirmed that the new calendar would begin with the annual draft and end with the PVL Press Corps Awards Night.

The PVL was recognized by the Philippine National Volleyball Federation as the Philippines' first and only professional volleyball league in November 2024. Along with the recognition, the league has committed the participation of the league champions as the Philippine representative team to the newly-rebranded AVC Women's Volleyball Champions League (formerly called Asian Women's Club Volleyball Championship), starting in the 2024–25 Premier Volleyball League All-Filipino Conference. Chery Tiggo disbanded after the 2024–25 season.

Beginning with the 2026 season, the PVL will enter a revenue-sharing model. 30 percent of the league's revenue will be split among member teams at the end of each season. Petro Gazz takes a leave of absence after the 2024–25 season. On April 28, 2026, Cignal takes a leave of absence from the PVL after the 2026 PVL All-Filipino Conference.

On August 26, 2026, The PVL unveils new logo ahead of landmark 10th season. On September 3, Sports Vision announced that the PVL's opening matchday will be held at SM Seaside Cebu Arena in Cebu City, and that the men's league, Spikers' Turf, will open its 10th season on the same day.

== Teams ==
As of the end of the 2026 All-Filipino Conference, there are nine teams in the Premier Volleyball League. Some sides are "sister teams" to each other and are affiliated/sponsored by a shared entity. Only three teams, the Capital1 Solar Spikers, Galeries Tower Highrisers, and PLDT High Speed Hitters, don't have any shared affiliations with other active teams and are referred to as "independent teams".

The PVL has a 12-team limit, excluding guest teams, meaning that the league can only admit an expansion or returning team either through a current member team withdrawing from competition, leaving a slot open, or through the acquisition or takeover of an existing franchise such as the case with Strong Group Athletics (now Zus Coffee Thunderbelles) in 2024.

Premier Volleyball League teams
Abbr.	Team	Company	Colors	Head coach	Team captain	Year founded	Year joined
AKA	Akari Chargers	Akari Lighting & Technology (Note: Akari Chargers and Nxled are sister teams through lighting brand owners Akari Lighting & Technology.)		(Philippines) Tina Salak	(Philippines) Justine Jazareno	2022	
CAP	Capital1 Solar Spikers	CapitalOne Energy Corp.		(Brazil) Jorge de Brito	(Philippines) Pauline Gaston	2024	
CMF	Choco Mucho Flying Titans	Rebisco Group of Companies (Note: Choco Mucho and Creamline are sister teams through Republic Biscuit Corporation (Rebisco).)		(Philippines) Dante Alinsunurin	(Philippines) Desiree Cheng	2019	
CCS	Creamline Cool Smashers	Rebisco Group of Companies		(Philippines) Sherwin Meneses	(Philippines) Alyssa Valdez	2017	
FFF	Farm Fresh Foxies	Farm Fresh Philippine International (Note: Farm Fresh and Zus Coffee are sister teams through Strong Group Athletics.)		(Japan) Koji Tsuzurabara	(Philippines) (United States) Alohi Robins-Hardy	2023	
GTH	Galeries Tower Highrisers	Grand Taipan Land Development		(Philippines) Aying Esteban	(Philippines) Roselle Baliton	2023	
NXL	Nxled Chameleons	Akari Lighting & Technology		(Italy) Ettore Guidetti	(Philippines) (United States) Brooke Van Sickle	2023	
HSH	PLDT High Speed Hitters	PLDT, Inc.		(Philippines) Rald Ricafort	(Philippines) Kath Arado	2018 (Note: The current PLDT franchise dates back to 2018, when it was known as the Smart Giga Hitters. The original PLDT team that competed as the PayMaya High Flyers in the 2018 Reinforced Conference was established in 2013 and merged with Smart in 2018.)	2021
ZUS	Zus Coffee Thunderbelles	Zus Coffee		(Philippines) Jerry Yee	(Philippines) Cloanne Mondoñedo	2024	

=== Teams under leave of absence ===
Leaves of absence traditionally last for a few conferences before the team eventually returns and differs from a complete departure or disbandment of the team.

Abbr.	Team	Company	Colors	Year founded	Year joined	Year left
CSS	Cignal Super Spikers	Cignal TV, Inc.		2013	2021	2026
MOT	Motolite Power Builders	Philippine Batteries Inc.		2019		2021
PGA	Petro Gazz Angels	PetroGazz Ventures Phils.		2018		2026
PRL	Perlas Spikers	Beach Volleyball Republic / Cosmetique Asia Corporation		2017		2022
PAR	Philippine Army Lady Troopers	Philippine Army		2011	2017	2023
SLR	Sta. Lucia Lady Realtors	Sta. Lucia Realty and Development Corporation		2017	2021	2022

=== Team rivalries ===
The league's most popular active rivalry is Choco Mucho–Creamline, a sister team clash that has seen large crowds, including a record attendance of 24,459 in a game in 2023. Historicaly, Creamline–Petro Gazz was one of the more notable rivalries, featuring the two most successful teams in league history. One of the league's earliest rivalries was BaliPure–Pocari Sweat after it was contested in the first two championship series. The rivalry didn't last long as Pocari departed the league in 2018 while BaliPure would continue competing until 2022.

== League format ==
=== Season format ===
Unlike other foreign professional volleyball leagues that have a single regular season spanning from October to May, the Premier Volleyball League seasons are divided into two to three "conferences" or tournaments, emulating the Philippine Basketball Association, and the now-defunct rival Philippine Super Liga with each tournament winner being counted as overall league champions.

Since 2022, a traditional PVL season is composed of three conferences – the All-Filipino Conference, Reinforced Conference, and Invitational Conference. Each conference differs on which players are allowed to compete or, in the case of the Invitational Conference, if guest teams are invited. While the format of each individual conference may vary, the traditional format includes a single round-robin tournament leading into a single-elimination tournament to determine the conference champion. There may be modifications such as teams being split into groups, a round-robin semifinal round, or additional rounds including a play-in tournament. The 2026–27 season will see the league's first attempt at running a full season. Instead of a single season divided into three tournaments, the league will run a single tournament divided into multiple series, with the final series acting as a season playoffs to determine an overall champion.

The league also hosts an all-star match, where two teams composed of star players take part in an exhibition match. These matches, however, were held infreuqently with the first two matches taking place in 2017 and 2019 followed by a seven-year gap until the first Volleyball All-Star Showcase in 2026. The All-Star Showcase itself is an event that is co-hosted with the men's Spikers' Turf, also organized by Sports Vision.

From 2017 to 2019, the league previously held a Collegiate Conference, but upon the PVL's professionalization in 2021, the Collegiate Conference was transferred to the revived V-League. The Invitational Conference then took its place from 2022 onwards.

=== Player eligibility ===
During its semi-professional era from 2017 to 2019, the league is open to players, whether they are simultaneously playing in their respective school leagues or not. One notable team is the 2018 Reinforced lineup of the Balipure–NU Water Defenders, where the core of the squad is composed of high school athletes from the NU Nazareth School. Local-based (LGU) teams were also welcomed to participate in the league.

Since 2021, players from UAAP member schools will need to forego their remaining eligible playing years to compete in the league as the UAAP now prohibits their student-athletes from participating in commercial sporting leagues. Athletes from the NCAA were still able to play by obtaining a special guest license (SGL) granted by the Games and Amusements Board (GAB) and honored by their collegiate league. This license allows them to play in a professional league without skipping their remaining collegiate playing years.

The 2024 season saw the commencement of the league's inaugural rookie draft, where players coming from colleges and universities who have not previously competed professionally can apply and be hired by club teams. With the launch of the rookie draft, teams are now barred from directly hiring players from the collegiate ranks, such as the NCAA, and the UAAP. Teams cannot also direct hire Filipino players that have not played in the league since its professionalization in 2021. Furthermore, it limits which players can apply and enter the league. They should be at least 21 years old by December 31 of the year of the annual draft, with no necessity for collegiate playing experience or academic qualifications, and Filipino-foreign players must secure a Philippine passport or a birth certificate issued in the Philippines before the deadline for submission of draft eligibility requirements.

=== Game rules ===
The PVL follows the rules and guidelines set by the FIVB, including unique mechanics created by the league or adopted from other tournaments.

During the 2021 season, teams did not switch courts due to the health protocols implemented at the height of the COVID-19 pandemic. This rule was kept until the 2022 season when the league reinstated the policy for teams to switch sides every set except during the 5th set (if such match goes such length).

During the 2023 Premier Volleyball League Second All-Filipino Conference, the league adopted a new court-switching mechanic that was first introduced at the FIVB Volleyball Nations League, where teams only switch courts twice, after the second set and once the leading team reaches 8 points in the 5th set.

Along with introducing the new court-switching rule, that conference also saw new timeout regulations, where only one technical timeout lasting from one to two minutes will come into effect when the leading team reaches 13 points, and teams have one regular timeout and another 30-second timeout for each set. At the start of the 2024 PVL season, the league fully reinstated its original time-out rules, where each set had two 60-second technical time-outs that is utilized when the leading team reaches 8 and 16 points. Meanwhile, each team had two 30-second time-outs. This season also introduced "green cards" that are given to a team or player that admits a committed fault to the referee as a promotion of fair play, streamlining the adjudication process and minimizing the need for unnecessary video challenges.

The 2022 Premier Volleyball League Reinforced Conference saw the first implementation of the video challenge system widely used in international and club volleyball tournaments. It introduced six challenges for the team to use – Ball In/Out, Block Touch, Net Fault, Antenna Touch, Foot Fault, and Floor Touch. The 2024–25 Premier Volleyball League All-Filipino Conference saw the addition of two new challenges – Last Touch and Reaching Beyond the Net. Referees can now also use the "Referee's Challenge" where the 1st referee can request a video review whenever he/she feels uncertain about his/her final decision.

The 2024–25 All-Filipino also saw one of the earliest implementations of the new rule set by the FIVB in its revised rulebook for 2025–28, where players of the serving team can now occupy any position, unlike before where both serving and receiving teams must be in rotational order at the service hit.

Game rule differences between PVL and FIVB tournaments
Rule	FIVB	PVL
Volleyball challenge system	Hawk-Eye challenge system (7): ~~Ball In/Out~~^{a}; Block Touch; Net Fault; Antenna Touch; Foot Fault; Floor Touch; Last Touch	Video challenge system (8): Ball In/Out; Block Touch; Net Fault; Antenna Touch; Foot Fault; Floor Touch; Last Touch; Reaching Beyond the Net
Change of courts	The teams change courts after each set, except the 5th set (if necessary). During the 5th set, once the leading team reaches 8 points, the teams change courts without delay and the player positions remain the same.	Teams will only change courts after the second set. In the 5th set (if necessary), once the leading team reaches 8 points, the teams change courts without delay and the player positions remain the same.
Technical time-outs	No	Yes (two per set; when the leading team reaches 8 and 16 points)

Note
a. Starting on the 2024 Nations League and the 2024 Summer Olympics, the hawk-eye system powered by Bolt6 Technology is now used in major FIVB tournaments to make the automated ball in/out calls. It reduces the number of challenge requests and processing, and eliminates the need for line judges/referees and the Ball In/Out challenge.

=== Awards ===
At the end of each conference, the league gives out multiple awards to its best-performing players. Regular awards include the Most Valuable Player, Finals Most Valuable Player, and a group of seven positional awards that make up the All-Premier Team. In 2025, the PVL Press Corps established an Awards Night and introduced a lineup of seasonal awards. Among the most notable are the Most Valuable Player of the Season and Mythical Team.

=== Qualification for Asian competitions ===
- AVC Women's Champions League/Asian Women's Club Volleyball Championship
  - 2021: The PNVF has invited the Premier Volleyball League to send its best finishing team in the 2021 Open Conference along with the national team which competed as Team Rebisco but all teams declined to enter. The PNVF fielded a second team composing of other players in the national team pool instead. The second team was named Team Choco Mucho.
  - 2025: The PVL has pledged the participation to the Asian club tournament starting the 2024–25 All-Filipino Conference.
- Asian Women's Volleyball Cup (national team)
  - 2022: The best performing local team at the 2022 Invitational Conference was slated to form the core of the Philippine national team for the Asian Women's Volleyball Cup. The Creamline Cool Smashers emerged as champions. Creamline as the national team placed sixth.

== Results summary ==
=== All-Filipino Conference ===
Season	Champions	Runners-up	Third place	Details
2017	BaliPure Purest Water Defenders	Pocari Sweat Lady Warriors	Creamline Cool Smashers	2017 Open
2018	Creamline Cool Smashers	Ateneo–Motolite Lady Eagles	BanKo Perlas Spikers	2018 Open
2019	Creamline Cool Smashers	Petro Gazz Angels	BanKo Perlas Spikers	2019 Open
2020	tournament cancelled due to COVID-19 pandemic			
2021	Chery Tiggo Crossovers	Creamline Cool Smashers	Petro Gazz Angels	2021 Open
2022	Creamline Cool Smashers	Petro Gazz Angels	Cignal HD Spikers	2022 Open
2023	Creamline Cool Smashers	Petro Gazz Angels	F2 Logistics Cargo Movers	2023 1st All-Filipino
2023	Creamline Cool Smashers	Choco Mucho Flying Titans	Cignal HD Spikers	2023 2nd All-Filipino
2024–25	Creamline Cool Smashers	Choco Mucho Flying Titans	Petro Gazz Angels	2024 All-Filipino
2024–25	Petro Gazz Angels	Creamline Cool Smashers	Akari Chargers	2024–25 All-Filipino
2025–26	Creamline Cool Smashers	Cignal Super Spikers	PLDT High Speed Hitters	2026 All-Filipino

=== Reinforced Conference ===
Season	Champions	Runners-up	Third place	Details
2017	Pocari Sweat Lady Warriors	BaliPure Purest Water Defenders	Creamline Cool Smashers	2017 Reinforced
2018	Creamline Cool Smashers	PayMaya Highflyers	BanKo Perlas Spikers	2018 Reinforced
2019	Petro Gazz Angels	Creamline Cool Smashers	Pacific Town-Army Lady Troopers	2019 Reinforced
2020	tournament cancelled due to COVID-19 pandemic			
2021	tournament cancelled due to COVID-19 pandemic			
2022	Petro Gazz Angels	Cignal HD Spikers	Creamline Cool Smashers	2022 Reinforced
2023	tournament cancelled due to PNVF sanctions			
2024–25	Creamline Cool Smashers	Akari Chargers	Cignal HD Spikers	2024 Reinforced
2025–26	Petro Gazz Angels	Zus Coffee Thunderbelles	Akari Chargers	2025 Reinforced

=== Invitational Conference ===
Season	Champions	Runners-up	Third place	Details
2022	Creamline Cool Smashers	KingWhale Taipei	Cignal HD Spikers	2022 Invitational
2023	Kurashiki Ablaze	Creamline Cool Smashers	Cignal HD Spikers	2023 Invitational
2024–25	Creamline Cool Smashers	Cignal HD Spikers	Kurashiki Ablaze	2024 Invitational
2025–26	PLDT High Speed Hitters	Kobe Shinwa University	Creamline Cool Smashers	2025 Invitational
2026–27	Est Cola	Nxled Chameleons	PLDT High Speed Hitters	2026 Invitational

=== PVL on Tour ===
Season	Champions	Runners-up	Third place	Details
2025–26	PLDT High Speed Hitters	Chery Tiggo Crossovers	Creamline Cool Smashers	2025 PVL on Tour

=== Collegiate Conference ===
Season	Champions	Runners-up	Third place	Details
2017	NU Lady Bulldogs	FEU Lady Tamaraws	Arellano Lady Chiefs	2017 Collegiate
2018	University of the Philippines	FEU Lady Tamaraws	Adamson Lady Falcons	2018 Collegiate
2019	Adamson Lady Falcons	UST Golden Tigresses	Ateneo Lady Eagles	2019 Collegiate
2022	see V-League			

== Medal table ==
Key
Former team
Foreign guest team

Commercial/club teams

Team	Gold medal	Silver medal	Bronze medal	Total
Creamline Cool Smashers	11	4	5	20
Petro Gazz Angels	4	3	2	9
PLDT High Speed Hitters	2	0	2	4
BaliPure Purest Water Defenders	1	1	0	2
Chery Tiggo Crossovers	1	1	0	2
Pocari Sweat Lady Warriors	1	1	0	2
Kurashiki Ablaze	1	0	1	2
Est Cola	1	0	0	1
Cignal Super Spikers	0	3	5	8
Choco Mucho Flying Titans	0	2	0	2
Akari Chargers	0	1	2	3
KingWhale Taipei	0	1	0	1
Kobe Shinwa University	0	1	0	1
Nxled Chameleons	0	1	0	1
PayMaya Highflyers	0	1	0	1
Zus Coffee Thunderbelles	0	1	0	1
Perlas Spikers	0	0	3	3
F2 Logistics Cargo Movers	0	0	1	1
Philippine Army Lady Troopers	0	0	1	1

Collegiate teams

Team	Gold medal	Silver medal	Bronze medal	Total
Adamson Lady Falcons	1	0	1	2
NU Lady Bulldogs	1	0	0	1
UP Fighting Maroons	1	0	0	1
FEU Lady Tamaraws	0	2	0	2
Ateneo Lady Eagles	0	1	1	2
UST Golden Tigresses	0	1	0	1
Arellano Lady Chiefs	0	0	1	1

== Awardees ==
Below is the table for the most awarded players in the league's history (2017–present):

Rank	Name	Position	Years playing in PVL		MVP	FMVP	AP	Total
Rank	Name	Position	From	To	MVP	FMVP	AP	Total
1	Alyssa Valdez	OH	2017	present	3	1	9	13
2	Jia de Guzman	S	2017	present	—	4	8	12
3	Jeanette Panaga	MB	2017	present	—	—	10	10
4	Tots Carlos	OP	2017	present	3	1	5	9
5	Myla Pablo	OH	2017	present	2	1	5	8
5	Jema Galanza	OH	2017	present	1	1	6	8
5	Kath Arado	L	2021	present	—	1	7	8
6	Brooke Van Sickle	OH	2024	present	3	0	3	6
6	Gel Cayuna	S	2017	present	—	—	6	6
7	Jaja Santiago	MB	2017–21; 2026	present	2	1	2	5
7	MJ Phillips	MB	2021	present	—	2	3	5
7	Grethcel Soltones	OH	2017	present	—	1	4	5
7	Kyle Negrito	S	2018	present	—	1	4	5
7	Thang Ponce	L	2022	present	—	—	5	5
7	Trisha Tubu	OP	2024	present	—	—	5	5
8	Savi Davison	OH	2023	present	1	—	3	4
8	Michele Gumabao	OP	2017	present	1	—	3	4
8	Bernadeth Pons	OH	2023	present	1	2	1	4

== Notable records ==
Premier Volleyball League notable records
Record	Holder	Conference	Figures
Match records
Most contested match	BanKo Perlas Spikers and Power Smashers	2017 Reinforced	29–31, 24–26, 25–19, 25–23, 21–19
Most lopsided match	Creamline Cool Smashers and Adamson Lady Falcons	2018 Open	25–7, 25–11, 25–10
Longest set	PacificTown-Army Lady Troopers and Choco Mucho Flying Titans	2019 Open	39-41
Shortest set	BaliPure Purest Water Defenders and Creamline Cool Smashers	2021 Open	3-25
Most attended match	Creamline Cool Smashers and Choco Mucho Flying Titans	2023 2nd All-Filipino	24,459
Player records
Most points in a match (Overall)	Marina Tushova	2024 Reinforced	50 points (47 attacks, 2 blocks, 1 ace)
Most points in a match (Local)	Tots Carlos	2024 All-Filipino	38 points (35 attacks, 3 blocks)
Most spikes in a match	Marina Tushova	2024 Reinforced	47 spikes
Most blocks in a match	Ria Meneses	2021 Open	10 blocks
Most blocks in a match	Maddie Madayag	2025 Reinforced	10 blocks
Most aces in a match	Alyssa Valdez	2018 Reinforced	8 aces
Most excellent sets in a match	Jia Morado-De Guzman	2017 Open	71 excellent sets
Highest reception efficiency in a match	Kath Arado	2023 1st All-Filipino	100% (14/14)
Most excellent digs in a match	Dawn Macandili-Catindig	2023 Invitational	48 excellent digs

== Arenas ==
Since PVL teams are managed by corporations, the league does not have a "home-and-away". Games are held at a variety of arenas, mostly in Metro Manila with occasional games held outside the region as part of the Premier Volleyball League on Tour.

Among the most frequently-used arenas are Playtime Filoil Centre in San Juan, PhilSports Arena in Pasig, Smart Araneta Coliseum in Quezon City, and SM Mall of Asia Arena in Pasay.

== Media coverage ==
Premier Volleyball League
- Genre: PVL game telecast
- Country of origin: Philippines
- Original languages: Filipino; English
- No. of seasons: 8

Production
- Production location: Various PVL venues
- Camera setup: Multiple-camera setup
- Running time: varies

Original release
- Network: ABS-CBN Sports
- Release: April 30, 2017 – November 9, 2019
- Network: Cignal TV
- Release: July 17, 2021 – present

Continuing from the Shakey's V-League, the PVL's first broadcast coverage partner was ABS-CBN Sports, with games broadcast across its network of sports channels. This partnership continued until 2020 following the shutdown of ABS-CBN broadcasting.

The PVL then signed a new deal with Cignal TV to become their new broadcast partner beginning with the 2021 season. Currently, One Sports (Note: Airs on One Sports (TV channel) and One Sports+. Since July 2026, the games is also streamed live on its YouTube channel) airs the games. RPTV also aired PVL games during the 2024 season. Cignal also streams the games via its Cignal Play, Smart LiveStream, and the league's official website.

- ABS-CBN Sports (2017–2020)
  - S+A (2017–2020)
  - S+A HD (2017–2020)
  - Liga (2018–2020)
  - Liga HD (2018–2020)
  - iWant Sports (2019–2020)
- Cignal TV (2021–present)
  - One Sports (2021–present)
  - One Sports+ (2021–present)
  - Cignal Play (2021–present)
  - Smart LiveStream (2021–2023)
  - Pilipinas Live (2023–2026)
  - RPTV (2024–present)

== Performance in Asian Championship ==
Season	Host	Club	Place	Awards	Ref.
2025	(Philippines) Pasig	Creamline Cool Smashers	5th place	—N/a	
2025	(Philippines) Pasig	Petro Gazz Angels	5th place	—N/a	
2025	(Philippines) Pasig	PLDT High Speed Hitters	5th place	—N/a	
2026	(Thailand) Bangkok	did not enter			

== See also ==
- Shakey's V-League
- Spikers' Turf
- V-League (Philippines)
- Timeline of the Premier Volleyball League
