= Bernadeth Pons =

Filipina volleyball player

Personal information
- Nationality: Filipino
- Born: Bernadeth Amoguis Pons; October 19, 1996 (age 30)
- Hometown: Talisay, Negros Occidental
- Height: 5 ft 8 in (1.73 m)
- Weight: 65 kg (143 lb)
- Education: Far Eastern University

Beach volleyball information

Current teammate
Years	Teammate
2017, 2025–present	Sisi Rondina

Previous teammates
Years	Teammate
2022	Jovelyn Gonzaga

Indoor volleyball information
- Position: Outside Hitter
- Current club: Creamline Cool Smashers
- Number: 19

Career
Years	Teams
2016–2019	Petron Blaze Spikers
2023–present	Creamline Cool Smashers

National team
2019–2023	Philippines women's (Beach)
Honours
Women's volleyball
Representing Philippines
Southeast Asian Games
Gold medal – first place	2025 Thailand	Women's beach
Bronze medal – third place	2019 Philippines	Women's beach
Bronze medal – third place	2021 Vietnam	Women's beach

Bernadeth Amoguis Pons (born October 19, 1996) is a Filipino indoor and beach volleyball athlete who plays as an outside hitter. She is currently playing for the Creamline Cool Smashers of the Premier Volleyball League (PVL).

== Career ==
=== Indoor volleyball ===
Pons played with Rafael B Lacson National High School, Western Visayas Regional Athletic Association and the Far Eastern University. She played with Petron Tri-Activ Spikers, winning the 2016 Philippine Super Liga All-Filipino Second Best Outside Spiker award.

In the 2017 season of the Philippine SuperLiga, Pons with the Petron Blaze Spikers won the Invitational Cup silver medal, All-Filipino Conference gold medal and the Grand Prix Conference silver medal. She became a team captain of FEU Lady Tamaraws during the UAAP Season 80 and she led the team in first finals appearance since UAAP Season 71. They finished as a runner-up after they lost in DLSU Lady Spikers in best-of-three finals.

=== Beach volleyball ===
In beach volleyball, Pons is known for playing alongside Sisi Rondina. Collectively, they are affectionately known by the name "SiPons". The pair has played together as early as the 2017 season of the Philippine Super Liga. The pair are part of the Petron Sprint 4T team which won the championship of the Beach Challenge Cup.

The pair were also part of a 4-player Philippine women's beach volleyball national team which won bronze at the 2019 and 2021 SEA Games. They also played in the 2023 edition but failed to make a podium finish.

Pons then featured in the World Beach Pro Tour in 2025 edition. Playing alongside Rondina in the Nuvali Future in Nuvali, Santa Rosa, Laguna, they made it as far as the quarterfinals.

In the 2025 SEA Games, Pons won the gold medal with Rondina.

== Personal life ==
Hailing from Talisay, Negros Occidental, she pursued a finance degree at the Far Eastern University.

== Awards ==
=== Indoor volleyball ===
==== Individuals ====
- 2016 Philippine Super Liga All-Filipino "2nd Best Outside Spiker"
- 2024 Premier Volleyball League Reinforced Conference "Conference Most Valuable Player"
- 2024 Premier Volleyball League Reinforced Conference "Finals Most Valuable Player"
- 2024–25 Premier Volleyball League All–Filipino Conference "Best Outside Hitter"

==== Collegiate ====
- 2014 UAAP Season 76 volleyball tournaments – 5th placer, with Far Eastern University Lady Tamaraws
- 2015 UAAP Season 77 volleyball tournaments – 4th placer, with Far Eastern University Lady Tamaraws
- 2015 UAAP Season 78 beach volleyball tournaments – Silver medal, with Far Eastern University Lady Tamaraws
- 2016 UAAP Season 78 volleyball tournaments – Bronze medal, with Far Eastern University Lady Tamaraws
- 2016 UAAP Season 79 beach volleyball tournaments – Silver medal, with Far Eastern University Lady Tamaraws
- 2017 UAAP Season 79 volleyball tournaments – 4th placer, with Far Eastern University Lady Tamaraws
- 2017 UAAP Season 80 beach volleyball tournaments – Silver medal, with Far Eastern University Lady Tamaraws
- 2018 UAAP Season 80 volleyball tournaments – Silver medal, with Far Eastern University Lady Tamaraws

==== Clubs ====
- 2017 Belo Philippine SuperLiga Invitational Cup – Silver medal, with Petron Blaze Spikers
- 2017 Rebisco Philippine SuperLiga All-Filipino Conference – Champion, with Petron Blaze Spikers
- 2017 Chooks-To-Go Philippine SuperLiga Grand Prix – Silver medal, with Petron Blaze Spikers
- 2018 Chooks-to-Go PSL Invitational Cup – Silver medal, with Petron Blaze Spikers
- 2018 Chooks-To-Go PSL All-Filipino Conference – Champion, with Petron Blaze Spikers
- 2019 PSL Grand Prix – Champion, with Petron Blaze Spikers
- 2019 PSL All-Filipino Conference – Third place, with Petron Blaze Spikers
- 2019 PSL Invitational Cup – Silver medal, with Petron Blaze Spikers
- 2023 Premier Volleyball League Invitational Conference – Silver medal, with Creamline Cool Smashers
- 2023 Premier Volleyball League 2nd All-Filipino Conference – Champion, with Creamline Cool Smashers
- 2024 Premier Volleyball League All-Filipino Conference – Champion, with Creamline Cool Smashers
- 2024 Premier Volleyball League Reinforced Conference – Champion, with Creamline Cool Smashers
- 2024 Premier Volleyball League Invitational Conference - Champion, With Creamline Cool Smashers

=== Beach volleyball ===
- 2016 PSL Beach Volleyball Challenge Cup – Third place, with FEU-Petron
- 2017 Belo Philippine SuperLiga Beach Volleyball Challenge Cup – Champion, with Petron Sprint 4T
- 2018 Chooks-To-Go Philippine SuperLiga Beach Volleyball Challenge Cup – Champion, with Petron XCS
- 2019 PSL Beach Volleyball Challenge Cup – Champion, with Petron XCS
- 2021 Beach Volleyball Republic on Tour – Leg 1 – Champion, with Creamline Beach Volleyball
- 2021 Beach Volleyball Republic on Tour – Leg 2 – Champion, with Creamline Beach Volleyball
- 2022 Australian Beach Volleyball Championship – Silver medal
