= Petron Blaze Spikers =

Philippines volleyball club

- Short name: Petron Blaze
- Nickname: Petron
- Founded: 2013
- Dissolved: 2020
- League: Philippine Super Liga (2013–2020)
- Website: Club home page
- Championships: Philippine Super Liga: 6 (2014 Grand Prix, 2015 All-Filipino, 2017 All-Filipino, 2018 Grand Prix, 2018 All-Filipino, 2019 Grand Prix)

The Petron Blaze Spikers were a women's volleyball team in the Philippines owned by Petron Corporation. The team competed in the Philippine Super Liga (PSL) from 2013 to 2020. The Blaze Spikers were one of the most successful teams in the PSL with six championships and 15 podium finishes overall.

After the cancellation of the 2020 season of the PSL due to the COVID-19 pandemic, Petron took a leave of absence from the league and released all its players. The team also didn't make the jump to the professional Premier Volleyball League in 2021.

== Team history ==
The company's involvement in volleyball began in 2002 when it established the Petron Ladies Beach Volleyball Tournament.

Petron became the first team to sweep a PSL tournament with a 13–0 record and claim the 2015 All-Filipino championship, its second consecutive PSL title. At their stint in the 2015 Asian Women's Club Volleyball Championship in Ha Nam, Vietnam, the team finished at 8th place with only one game won out of six matches played.

On September 12, 2016, the team parted ways with coach George Pascua. He was replaced by Shaq Delos Santos.

Due to the COVID-19 pandemic, the 2020 season of the PSL was cancelled. Prior to the beginning of 2021 season, the team, along with two other member teams took an indefinite leave of absence from the league and released all of its players.

== Name changes ==
The Petron Tri-Activ Spikers logo used during the 2016 season.

=== Indoor volleyball ===
- Petron Blaze Spikers (2013–2015, 2017–2020)
- Petron Tri-Activ Spikers (2016)

=== Beach volleyball ===
- Petron Sprint 4T (Petron Team A: 2015–2017)
- Petron XCS (Petron Team B: 2015–2017; solo team: 2018)

== Final roster ==
For the 2020 Philippine Super Liga Grand Prix:

Petron Blaze Spikers
No.	Name	Position
1	(United States) Khat Bell (I)	WS
2	(Philippines) Mary Anne Esguerra	MB
3	(Philippines) Ging Balse	MB
4	(Philippines) (Canada) Rebecca Rivera	S
5	(Philippines) Carla Sandoval	OP
6	(Philippines) Jem Nicole Gutierrez	WS
7	(Philippines) Frances Molina	OH
8	(Philippines) Aiza Maizo-Pontillas (c)	OP
9	(Philippines) Remy Palma	MB
11	(Philippines) Camille Belaro (L)	L
12	(Philippines) Roselle Baliton	MB
13	(Philippines) Fritz Joy Gallenero (L)	L
15	(Philippines) Angelica Legacion	S
16	(Philippines) Lutgarda Malaluan	MB
17	(Philippines) Mary Joy Onofre	MB
18	(Philippines) Bien Elaine Juanillo	MB
19	(Philippines) Anngela Nunag (L)	L
20	(Philippines) Mary Grace Berte	WS
22	(Philippines) Rica Jane Rivera	L

== Season-by-season records ==
=== Philippine Super Liga ===
Season	Conference	Preliminary round	Playoffs	Ranking	Source
2013	Invitational	3rd (3–2, 9 pts)	Won in quarterfinals vs. PCSO, 3–2; Lost in semifinals vs. Cignal, 0–3 Won in third place match vs. Cagayan Valley, 3–1	3rd place	
2013	Grand Prix	5th (1–4, 2 pts)	Lost in quarterfinals vs. Cignal, 1–3 Won in fifth place match vs. RC Cola, 3–2	5th place	
2014	All-Filipino	3rd (4–2, 11 pts)	Lost in quarterfinals vs. PLDT, 1–3 Won in fifth place match vs. Cagayan Valley, 3–0	5th place	
2014	Grand Prix	1st (8–2, 24 pts)	Won in semifinals vs. Cignal, 3–0; Won in championship vs. Generika, 3–1	Champions	
2015	All-Filipino	1st (10–0, 28 pts)	Won in semifinals vs. Philips Gold, 3–0; Won in championship vs. Shopinas.com, 2–0 (Note: Best-of-three series.)	Champions	
2015	Grand Prix	2nd (7–3, 21 pts)	Won in semifinals vs. Cignal, 3–1; Lost in championship vs. Foton, 1–2	Runner-up	
2016	Invitational	2nd (5–1, 16 pts)	Finished 3rd in final round (1–2, 3 pts)	3rd place	
2016	All-Filipino	3rd (5–2, 15 pts) (First round); 3rd (1–2, 4 pts) (Second round)	Lost in semifinals vs. F2 Logistics, 0–3 Lost in third place match vs. RC Cola–Army, 2–3	4th place	
2016	Grand Prix	2nd (8–2, 25 pts)	Won in semifinals vs. F2 Logistics, 3–2; Lost in championship vs. Foton, 0–2	Runner-up	
2017	Invitational	1st (5–0, 14 pts)	Finished 3rd in final round (1–2, 3 pts)	3rd place	
2017	All-Filipino	3rd (4–2, 10 pts) (Pool C)	Won in quarterfinals vs. Sta. Lucia, 3–0; Won in semifinals vs. Foton, 3–1; Won in championship vs. F2 Logistics, 2–0	Champions	
2017	Grand Prix	2nd (7–1, 21 pts)	Won in quarterfinals vs. Generika–Ayala, 3–2; Won in semifinals vs. Foton, 3–1; Lost in championship vs. F2 Logistics, 1–2	Runner-up	
2018	Grand Prix	2nd (9–1, 25 pts)	Won in quarterfinals vs. Generika–Ayala, 3–0; Won in semifinals Cocolife, 3–1; Won in championship vs. F2 Logistics, 2–1	Champions	
2018	Invitational	1st (3–1, 10 pts) (Group A)	Won in semifinals vs. Smart–Army, 3–0; Lost in championship vs. F2 Logistics, 0–2	Runner-up	
2018	All-Filipino	1st (10–0, 30 pts)	Won in quarterfinals vs. Sta. Lucia, 3–0; Won in semifinals vs. Cignal, 3–0; Won in championship vs. F2 Logistics, 2–1	Champions	
2019	Grand Prix	1st (14–0, 42 pts)	Won in quarterfinals vs. Sta. Lucia, 3–0 (Note: Team had twice-to-beat advantage.); Won in semifinals vs. Cignal, 2–0; Won in championship vs. F2 Logistics, 2–1	Champions	
2019	All-Filipino	1st (13–1, 34 pts)	Won in quarterfinals vs. Marinerang Pilipina, 3–0; Lost in semifinals vs. Cignal in two matches Won in third place match vs. Foton, 2–3	3rd place	
2019	Invitational	1st (3–0, 9 pts)	Won in semifinals vs. Foton, 3–0; Lost in championship vs. F2 Logistics, 2–3	Runner-up	
2020	Grand Prix	Conference cancelled			

=== Asian Women's Club Volleyball Championship ===
Season	League	Tournament	Title	Source
2015	Asian Volleyball Confederation	AVC Club Volleyball Championship	8th place	

== Individual awards ==
Most Valuable Player	Coach of the Year	1st Best Libero	2nd Best Libero
(United States) Lindsay Stalzer - 2018 Grand Prix; (Philippines) Aiza Maizo-Pontillas - 2017 All Filipino; (Philippines) Rachel Daquis - 2015 All-Filipino; (United States) Alaina Bergsma - 2014 Grand Prix; (United States) Stephanie Niemer - 2019 Grand Prix; (Philippines) Rhea Dimaculangan - 2018 All-Filipino	(Philippines) George Pascua - 2015 Grand Prix	(Philippines) Jennylyn Reyes - 2014 Grand Prix, 2015 All-Filipino, 2015 Grand Prix	(Japan) Yuri Fukuda - 2017 Grand Prix
1st Best Setter	2nd Best Setter	1st Best Middle Blocker	2nd Best Middle Blocker
(Brazil) Erica Adachi - 2014 Grand Prix; (Philippines) Rhea Dimaculangan - 2017 All Filipino, 2019 Grand Prix	(Brazil) Erica Adachi - 2015 Grand Prix	(Philippines) Dindin Santiago-Manabat - 2015 All-Filipino; (Philippines) Mika Reyes - 2017 Grand Prix	(Philippines) Dindin Santiago-Manabat - 2014 Grand Prix; (Philippines) Aby Maraño - 2015 All-Filipino; (Philippines) Maica Morada - 2016 Invitational; (Philippines) Mika Reyes - 2017 All Filipino, 2018 Grand Prix
1st Best Opposite Spiker	2nd Best Opposite Spiker	1st Best Outside Spiker	2nd Best Outside Spiker
(Philippines) Aiza Maizo-Pontillas - 2016 Invitational, 2018 Invitational; (United States) Stephanie Niemer - 2016 Grand Prix	(Philippines) Frances Molina - 2015 Grand Prix	(United States) Stephanie Niemer - 2016 Grand Prix; (Philippines) Frances Molina - 2017 Invitational; (United States) Hillary Hurley - 2017 Grand Prix; (United States) Khat Bell - 2019 Grand Prix	(Philippines) Bernadeth Pons - 2016 All-Filipino; (United States) Lindsay Stalzer - 2017 Grand Prix; (Philippines) Sisi Rondina - 2018 Invitational, 2019 All-Filipino
Best Scorer	Beach Volleyball MVP		
(United States) Stephanie Niemer - 2019 Grand Prix	(Philippines) Sisi Rondina - 2017 Challenge Cup		

== Team captains ==
- (Philippines) Roxanne Pimentel-So (2013)
- (Philippines) Karla Bello (2013)
- (Philippines) Gretchen Ho (2014)
- (Philippines) Maica Morada (2015)
- (Philippines) Aiza Maizo-Pontillas (2016, 2016)
- (Philippines) Frances Molina (2016–2017, 2018, 2018, 2019, 2019)
- (United States) Lindsay Stalzer (2018)
- (United States) Katherine Bell (2019, 2020)

== Coaches ==
- Vilet Ponce de Leon (2013)
- George Pascua (2014–2016)
- Shaq Delos Santos (2016–2019)
- Emil Lontoc (2020)

== Notable players ==
=== Local players ===
- Fille Cayetano
- Rachel Daquis
- Rhea Dimaculangan
- Melissa Gohing
- Gretchen Ho
- Dindin Santiago-Manabat
- Aby Maraño
- Ria Meneses
- Alexa Micek
- Frances Molina
- Maica Morada
- Kyle Negrito
- Cherry Nunag
- Maika Ortiz
- Remy Palma
- Bang Pineda
- Bernadeth Pons
- Aiza Maizo-Pontillas
- Jennylyn Reyes
- Mika Reyes
- Sisi Rondina
- Charo Soriano
- Carmela Tunay

=== Imports ===
(A-F)

- (Brazil) Erica Adachi (2014, 2015)
- (United States) Katherine Bell (2018)
- (United States) Alaina Bergsma (2014)
- (Japan) Yuri Fukuda (2017–2018)

(G-L)

- (United States) Hillary Hurley (2017–2018)
- (Brazil) Rupia Inck (2015)

(M-R)

- (United States) Stephanie Niemer (2016)

(S-Z)

- (United States) Lindsay Stalzer (2017–2018)
- (Japan) Shinako Tanaka (2013)
- (Japan) Misao Tanyama (2013)
- (United States) Serena Warner (2016)

== Beach volleyball teams ==
Petron
- Nickname: Petron
- League: PSL Beach Volleyball Challenge Cup (2015–2019)
- Championships: 3 (2017, 2018, 2019)

Petron has also fielded multiple teams in beach volleyball for the annual Philippine Super Liga Beach Volleyball Challenge Cup. Petron is the most successful organization in the tournament's history; its squads winning three straight women's titles from 2017 to 2019.

=== Season-by-season records ===
Season	Preliminary round	Playoffs	Ranking	Source
2015 (Sprint 4T)	3rd (1–2, 3 pts) (Pool D)	Did not qualify Won in ninth place match vs. Accel Quantum Plus (A), 2–0	9th place	
2015 (XCS)	2nd (1–1, 3 pts) (Pool B)	Lost in quarterfinals vs. Foton Hurricanes, 1–2; Lost in fifth place match vs. Meralco by default	6th place	
2016 (Sprint 4T)	2nd (1–1, 3 pts) (Pool B)	Lost in quarterfinals vs. RC Cola–Army, 0–2; Lost in seventh place match vs. ?	8th place	
2016 (XCS)	2nd (1–1, 3 pts) (Pool C)	Lost in semifinals vs. RC Cola–Army, ? Lost in third place match vs. FEU–Petron, 0–2	4th place	
2017 (Sprint 4T)	1st (2–0, 6 pts) (Pool B)	Won in championship vs. Generika–Ayala (A), 2–0	Champions	
2017 (XCS)	1st (2–0, 6 pts) (Pool D)	Lost in semifinals vs. Petron Sprint 4T, 0–2; Won in third place match vs. Sta. Lucia, 2–1	3rd place	
2018 (Note: The team was known as Petron XCS for the 2018 Beach Volleyball Challenge Cup.)	1st (2–0, 6 pts) (Pool A)	Won in championship vs. Sta. Lucia (A), 2–0	Champions	
2019 (XCS)	1st (3–0, 6 pts) (Pool A)	Won in championship vs. Sta. Lucia–Santorini, 2–0	Champions	
2019 (Sprint 4T)	2nd (2–1, 5 pts) (Pool B)	Lost in semifinals vs. Sta. Lucia–Santorini, 0–2; Lost in third place match vs. Sta. Lucia–Woodside, 1–2	4th place	
2021	Did not participate			
