= 2019 Philippine Super Liga Grand Prix =

First indoor conference of the 2019 Philippine Super Liga season

- Duration: February 16 – May 4, 2019
- Teams: 8
- TV partner(s): ESPN 5, 5 Plus, One Sports

Results
- Champions: Petron Blaze Spikers
- Runners-up: F2 Logistics Cargo Movers
- Third place: PLDT Home Fibr Power Hitters
- Fourth place: Cignal HD Spikers

Awards
- MVP: Stephanie Niemer
- Best OH: Khat Bell; Ara Galang
- Best MB: Grace Lazard; Aby Maraño
- Best OPP: Erika Wilson; Aiko Urdas
- Best Setter: Rhea Dimaculangan
- Best Libero: Dawn Macandili

PSL Grand Prix chronology
- < 2018 2020 >

PSL conference chronology
- < 2018 All-Filipino 2019 All-Filipino >
- < 2018 Collegiate 2019 BVCC (beach) >

The 2019 Philippine Super Liga Grand Prix was the first conference of the 2019 season of the Philippine Super Liga (PSL) and the seventh running of the Grand Prix. The tournament began on February 16, 2019 at the Ynares Sports Arena in Pasig, and ended on May 4, 2019.

The F2 Logistics Cargo Movers and Petron Blaze Spikers contested the title for the sixth consecutive conference, but this time, Petron was able to defend their crown to win their sixth league title.

== Teams ==
2019 Philippine Super Liga Grand Prix
Abbr.	Team	Affiliation	Head coach	Team captain	Imports
CIG	Cignal HD Spikers	Cignal TV, Inc.	(Philippines) Edgar Barroga	(Philippines) Rachel Daquis	(United States) Erica Wilson (Azerbaijan) Anastasiya Artemeva
F2L	F2 Logistics Cargo Movers	F2 Global Logistics Inc.	(Philippines) Ramil de Jesus	(Philippines) Cha Cruz-Behag (United States) Lindsay Stalzer	(United States) Lindsay Stalzer (Italy) Rebecca Perry (withdrew) (Venezuela) María José Pérez
FOT	Foton Tornadoes Blue Energy	United Asia Automotive Group, Inc.	(Philippines) Aaron Vélez	(Philippines) Maika Ortiz	(United States) Courtney Felinski (Turkey) Selime İlyasoğlu (withdrew) (Spain) Milagros Collar
GAL	Generika–Ayala Lifesavers	Actimed, Inc.	(Philippines) Sherwin Meneses	(Philippines) Angeli Pauline Araneta	(Brazil) Nikolle del Rio (withdrew) (Azerbaijan) Kseniya Koçyiğit (Thailand) Kanjana Kuthaisong
PET	Petron Blaze Spikers	Petron Corporation	(Philippines) Shaq delos Santos	(United States) Khat Bell	(United States) Stephanie Niemer (United States) Khat Bell
PLD	PLDT Home Fibr Power Hitters	PLDT	(Philippines) Roger Gorayeb	(Philippines) Grethcel Soltones	(United Kingdom) Grace Lazard (United States) Kendra Dahlke
SLR	Sta. Lucia Lady Realtors	Sta. Lucia Realty and Development Corporation	(Philippines) Raymund Castillo	(Philippines) Pamela Tricia Lastimosa	(United States) Molly Lohman (United States) Casey Schoenlein
UVC	United Volleyball Club	United Volleyball Club	(Philippines) Joshua Ylaya	(Philippines) Kalei Mau	(United States) Yaasmeen Bedart-Ghani (United States) Shar Latai Manu-Olevao (withdrew) (Thailand) Sutadta Chuewulim

== Format ==
Preliminary round

- The preliminary round was a double round-robin tournament, with each team playing two matches against all other teams for a total of 14 matches.

Quarterfinals

- The quarterfinals featured the twice-to-beat advantage. The top four teams only needed to win one out of two matches to advance while the bottom needed to win two matches back-to-back to do so.
- The match-ups were as follows:
  - QF1: #1 vs. #8
  - QF2: #2 vs. #7
  - QF3: #3 vs. #6
  - QF4: #4 vs. #5
- The winners advanced to the semifinals while the losers were eliminated.

Semifinals

- The semifinals featured best-of-three series.
- The match-ups were as follows:
  - SF1: QF1 winner vs. QF4 winner
  - SF2: QF2 winner vs. QF3 winner
- The winners advanced to the championship match while the losers would play in the third-place match.

Finals

- The third-place match was single-elimination while the championship was a best-of-three series.
- The match-ups were as follows:
  - Championship: Semifinal round winners
  - Third-place match: Semifinal round losers

== Preliminary round ==
Pos	Team	Pld	W	L	Pts	SW	SL	SR	SPW	SPL	SPR	Qualification
1	Petron Blaze Spikers	14	14	0	42	42	1	42.000	1073	699	1.535	Twice-to-beat in quarterfinals
2	F2 Logistics Cargo Movers	14	11	3	33	35	13	2.692	1037	956	1.085	Twice-to-beat in quarterfinals
3	PLDT Home Fibr Power Hitters	14	8	6	22	26	24	1.083	1090	1097	0.994	Twice-to-beat in quarterfinals
4	Cignal HD Spikers	14	7	7	20	23	28	0.821	1097	1123	0.977	Twice-to-beat in quarterfinals
5	United Volleyball Club	14	7	7	19	25	29	0.862	1046	1031	1.015	Twice-to-win in quarterfinals
6	Generika–Ayala Lifesavers	14	4	10	14	24	35	0.686	1197	1285	0.932	Twice-to-win in quarterfinals
7	Foton Tornadoes Blue Energy	14	3	11	11	16	36	0.444	1134	1250	0.907	Twice-to-win in quarterfinals
8	Sta. Lucia Lady Realtors	14	2	12	7	14	39	0.359	994	1226	0.811	Twice-to-win in quarterfinals

== First round ==
Date	Time		Score		Set 1	Set 2	Set 3	Set 4	Set 5	Total	Report
16 Feb	16:00	United Volleyball Club	1–3	Foton Tornadoes Blue Energy	24–26	20–25	25–15	21–25		90–91	
16 Feb	18:00	Sta. Lucia Lady Realtors	3–2	Generika–Ayala Lifesavers	25–21	22–25	25–23	16–25	16–14	104–108	
19 Feb	14:00	Petron Blaze Spikers	3–0	PLDT Home Fibr Power Hitters	25–19	25–9	25–10			75–38	
19 Feb	16:15	United Volleyball Club	3–2	Sta. Lucia Lady Realtors	12–25	15–25	25–17	25–22	15–9	92–98	
19 Feb	19:00	Cignal HD Spikers	1–3	F2 Logistics Cargo Movers	24–26	25–21	21–25	14–25		84–97	
21 Feb	14:00	PLDT Home Fibr Power Hitters	0–3	Cignal HD Spikers	22–25	25–27	19–25			66–77	
21 Feb	16:15	F2 Logistics Cargo Movers	3–0	Sta. Lucia Lady Realtors	25–21	25–19	25–19			75–59	
21 Feb	19:00	Petron Blaze Spikers	3–0	Generika–Ayala Lifesavers	25–16	25–23	25–15			75–54	
23 Feb	14:00	Cignal HD Spikers	3–1	Sta. Lucia Lady Realtors	23–25	25–11	25–16	25–23		98–75	
23 Feb	16:00	PLDT Home Fibr Power Hitters	3–2	Generika–Ayala Lifesavers	24–26	25–23	19–25	25–21	15–8	108–103	
23 Feb	18:00	Foton Tornadoes Blue Energy	0–3	Petron Blaze Spikers	19–25	11–25	12–25			42–75	
26 Feb	14:00	F2 Logistics Cargo Movers	3–1	United Volleyball Club	23–25	25–23	25–21	25–22		98–91	
26 Feb	16:15	Foton Tornadoes Blue Energy	0–3	PLDT Home Fibr Power Hitters	16–25	20–25	17–25			53–75	
26 Feb	19:00	Generika–Ayala Lifesavers	1–3	Cignal HD Spikers	25–19	17–25	15–25	19–25		76–94	
28 Feb	14:00	Sta. Lucia Lady Realtors	0–3	Petron Blaze Spikers	8–25	8–25	18–25			34–75	
28 Feb	16:15	Foton Tornadoes Blue Energy	0–3	F2 Logistics Cargo Movers	20–25	20–25	24–26			64–76	
28 Feb	19:00	Cignal HD Spikers	0–3	United Volleyball Club	22–25	13–25	27–29			62–79	
02 Mar	14:00	Foton Tornadoes Blue Energy	2–3	Cignal HD Spikers	25–15	22–25	25–21	13–25	19–21	104–107	
02 Mar	16:00	Sta. Lucia Lady Realtors	0–3	PLDT Home Fibr Power Hitters	17–25	23–25	18–25			58–75	
02 Mar	18:00	Generika–Ayala Lifesavers	2–3	United Volleyball Club	23–25	25–17	22–25	25–23	11–15	106–105	
05 Mar	14:00	Foton Tornadoes Blue Energy	1–3	Sta. Lucia Lady Realtors	25–13	21–25	23–25	21–25		90–88	
05 Mar	16:15	United Volleyball Club	0–3	Petron Blaze Spikers	12–25	16–25	20–25			48–75	
05 Mar	19:00	Generika–Ayala Lifesavers	1–3	F2 Logistics Cargo Movers	25–21	19–25	22–25	16–25		82–96	
07 Mar	14:00	Foton Tornadoes Blue Energy	2–3	Generika–Ayala Lifesavers	21–25	22–25	25–19	25–20	11–15	104–104	
07 Mar	16:15	United Volleyball Club	3–1	PLDT Home Fibr Power Hitters	25–18	17–25	25–22	25–17		92–82	
07 Mar	19:00	Petron Blaze Spikers	3–1	F2 Logistics Cargo Movers	23–25	25–15	25–22	25–18		98–80	
09 Mar	16:00	Petron Blaze Spikers	3–0	Cignal HD Spikers	25–15	25–19	25–14			75–48	
09 Mar	18:00	F2 Logistics Cargo Movers	3–0	PLDT Home Fibr Power Hitters	25–20	25–21	25–19			75–60	

=== Second round ===
Date	Time		Score		Set 1	Set 2	Set 3	Set 4	Set 5	Total	Report
12 Mar	14:00	Generika–Ayala Lifesavers	2–3	PLDT Home Fibr Power Hitters	21–25	25–20	27–29	25–13	12–15	110–102	
12 Mar	16:15	Petron Blaze Spikers	3–0	Foton Tornadoes Blue Energy	25–20	25–13	25–21	–	–	75–54	
12 Mar	19:00	Sta. Lucia Lady Realtors	1–3	Cignal HD Spikers	25–21	13–25	13–25	19–25	–	70–96	
14 Mar	14:00	PLDT Home Fibr Power Hitters	3–1	Foton Tornadoes Blue Energy	25–16	27–25	22–25	26–24	–	100–90	
14 Mar	16:15	Cignal HD Spikers	0–3	Generika–Ayala Lifesavers	17–25	20–25	22–25	–	–	59–75	
14 Mar	19:00	United Volleyball Club	0–3	F2 Logistics Cargo Movers	22–25	21–25	22–25	–	–	65–75	
16 Mar	16:00	PLDT Home Fibr Power Hitters	3–1	F2 Logistics Cargo Movers	25–20	23–25	25–21	25–18	–	98–84	
16 Mar	18:00	Cignal HD Spikers	0–3	Petron Blaze Spikers	10–25	7–25	19–25	–	–	36–75	
19 Mar	14:00	United Volleyball Club	3–1	Cignal HD Spikers	14–25	25–21	25–21	26–24	–	90–91	
19 Mar	16:15	PLDT Home Fibr Power Hitters	0–3	Petron Blaze Spikers	18–25	21–25	14–25	–	–	53–75	
19 Mar	19:00	Sta. Lucia Lady Realtors	0–3	F2 Logistics Cargo Movers	23–25	14–25	16–25	–	–	53–75	
21 Mar	14:00	United Volleyball Club	2–3	Generika–Ayala Lifesavers	23–25	25–21	25–19	25–27	12–15	110–107	
21 Mar	16:15	Foton Tornadoes Blue Energy	1–3	Cignal HD Spikers	25–15	20–25	18–25	20–25	–	83–90	
21 Mar	19:00	Sta. Lucia Lady Realtors	0–3	PLDT Home Fibr Power Hitters	15–25	24–26	13–25	–	–	52–76	
23 Mar	16:00	Generika–Ayala Lifesavers	3–1	Sta. Lucia Lady Realtors	25–20	25–20	21–25	25–18	–	96–83	
23 Mar	18:00	Petron Blaze Spikers	3–0	F2 Logistics Cargo Movers	25–14	25–17	25–21	–	–	75–52	
26 Mar	14:00	Generika–Ayala Lifesavers	0–3	Petron Blaze Spikers	23–25	13–25	21–25	–	–	57–75	
26 Mar	16:15	Cignal HD Spikers	3–1	PLDT Home Fibr Power Hitters	25–16	25–23	17–25	25–18	–	92–82	
26 Mar	19:00	Foton Tornadoes Blue Energy	0–3	United Volleyball Club	18–25	23–25	22–25	–	–	63–75	
28 Mar	12:00	PLDT Home Fibr Power Hitters	3–0	United Volleyball Club	25–23	25–16	25–22	–	–	75–61	
28 Mar	14:00	Petron Blaze Spikers	3–0	Sta. Lucia Lady Realtors	25–21	25–12	25–20	–	–	75–53	
30 Mar	16:00	F2 Logistics Cargo Movers	3–0	Foton Tornadoes Blue Energy	28–26	25–15	25–23	–	–	78–64	
30 Mar	18:00	Petron Blaze Spikers	3–0	United Volleyball Club	25–14	25–17	25–19	–	–	75–50	
02 Apr	16:15	Sta. Lucia Lady Realtors	1–3	Foton Tornadoes Blue Energy	25–12	14–25	20–25	15–25	–	74–87	
02 Apr	19:00	Generika–Ayala Lifesavers	1–3	F2 Logistics Cargo Movers	12–25	27–25	24–26	14–25	–	77–101	
04 Apr	14:00	Sta. Lucia Lady Realtors	2–3	United Volleyball Club	25–21	18–25	25–23	14–25	11–15	93–109	
04 Apr	16:15	Cignal HD Spikers	0–3	F2 Logistics Cargo Movers	19–25	20–25	24–26	–	–	63–76	
04 Apr	19:00	Generika–Ayala Lifesavers	1–3	Foton Tornadoes Blue Energy	20–25	25–20	22–25	11–25	–	78–95	

== Playoffs ==
Quarter-finals; Ranked 1 to 4 has twice-to-beat advantage
(1) Petron Blaze Spikers	2
(8) Sta. Lucia Lady Realtors	0
(4) Cignal HD Spikers	2
(5) United Volleyball Club	0
(2) F2 Logistics Cargo Movers	2
(7) Foton Tornadoes Blue Energy	1
(3) PLDT Home Fibr Power Hitters	2
(6) Generika–Ayala Lifesavers	1

Semi-finals; Best-of-three series
Petron Blaze Spikers	2
Cignal HD Spikers	0
F2 Logistics Cargo Movers	2
PLDT Home Fibr Power Hitters	0

Finals; Best-of-three series
Petron Blaze Spikers	2
F2 Logistics Cargo Movers	1
Bronze medal match
Cignal HD Spikers	2
PLDT Home Fibr Power Hitters	3

=== Quarterfinals ===
Date	Time		Score		Set 1	Set 2	Set 3	Set 4	Set 5	Total	Report
06 Apr	16:00	Petron Blaze Spikers	3–0	Sta. Lucia Lady Realtors	25–17	25–11	25–18			75–46	
06 Apr	18:00	Foton Tornadoes Blue Energy	2–3	Foton Tornadoes Blue Energy	25–27	25–19	22–25	25–16	12–15	109–102	
09 Apr	16:00	PLDT Home Fibr Power Hitters	1–3	Generika–Ayala Lifesavers	25–21	22–25	22–25	24–26		93–97	
09 Apr	19:00	Cignal HD Spikers	3–1	United Volleyball Club	25–22	18–25	25–21	25–20		93–88	
11 Apr	19:00	Foton Tornadoes Blue Energy	1–3	Foton Tornadoes Blue Energy	22–25	27–25	21–25	19–25		89–100	
13 Apr	16:00	Generika–Ayala Lifesavers	2–3	PLDT Home Fibr Power Hitters	15–25	20–25	26–24	27–25	12–15	100–114	

=== Semifinals ===
Best-of-three series

Date	Time		Score		Set 1	Set 2	Set 3	Set 4	Set 5	Total	Report
23 Apr	16:15	F2 Logistics Cargo Movers	3–1	PLDT Home Fibr Power Hitters	25–14	18–25	25–16	25–22		93–77	
23 Apr	19:00	Petron Blaze Spikers	3–1	Cignal HD Spikers	20–25	25–14	25–13	25–18		95–70	
25 Apr	16:15	Petron Blaze Spikers	3–1	Cignal HD Spikers	23–25	25–17	25–16	25–21		98–79	
25 Apr	19:00	F2 Logistics Cargo Movers	3–0	PLDT Home Fibr Power Hitters	26–24	26–24	25–17			77–65	

=== Bronze match ===
Date	Time		Score		Set 1	Set 2	Set 3	Set 4	Set 5	Total	Report
30 April	16:15	Cignal HD Spikers	2–3	PLDT Home Fibr Power Hitters	19–25	18–25	25–20	25–20	17–19	104–109	

== Finals ==
Best-of-three series

Date	Time		Score		Set 1	Set 2	Set 3	Set 4	Set 5	Total	Report
30 April	19:00	Petron Blaze Spikers	1–3	F2 Logistics Cargo Movers	20–25	25–16	23–25	23–25		91–91	
02 May	19:00	F2 Logistics Cargo Movers	1–3	Petron Blaze Spikers	25–23	23–25	14–25	19–25		81–98	
04 May	18:00	Petron Blaze Spikers	3–1	F2 Logistics Cargo Movers	26–24	25–19	23–25	25–19		99–87	

== Final standing ==
Rank	Team
1st place, gold medalist(s)	Petron Blaze Spikers
2nd place, silver medalist(s)	F2 Logistics Cargo Movers
3rd place, bronze medalist(s)	PLDT Home Fibr Power Hitters
4	Cignal HD Spikers
5	United Volleyball Club
6	Generika–Ayala Lifesavers
7	Foton Tornadoes Blue Energy
8	Sta. Lucia Lady Realtors

2019 PSL Grand Prix Champions
Petron Blaze Spikers
Team roster
Khat Bell (Captain)/(Import), Bernadeth Pons, Mika Reyes, Stephanie Niemer (Import), Mary Anne Esguerra, Frances Molina, Aiza Maizo-Pontillas, Mary Remy Joy Palma, Toni Rose Basas, Princess Ira Gaiser (Libero), Rhea Dimaculangan, Denden Lazaro (Libero), Chlodia Eiriel Ysabella Cortez, Angelica Legacion, Carmela Tunay, Cesael delos Santos (Head Coach)

== Individual awards ==
Award		Name/Team
MVP		(United States) Stephanie Niemer (Petron)
Best Outside Spikers	Foreign	(United States) Khat Bell (Petron)
Best Outside Spikers	Local	(Philippines) Ara Galang (F2 Logistics)
Best Middle Blockers	Foreign	(United Kingdom) Grace Lazard (PLDT)
Best Middle Blockers	Local	(Philippines) Aby Maraño (F2 Logistics)
Best Opposite Spikers	Foreign	(United States) Erika Wilson (Cignal)
Best Opposite Spikers	Local	(Philippines) Aiko Urdas (PLDT)
Best Setter		(Philippines) Rhea Dimaculangan (Petron)
Best Libero		(Philippines) Dawn Macandili (F2 Logistics)
Best Scorer		(United States) Stephanie Niemer (Petron)

== Venues ==
Main venues

- Filoil Flying V Arena (main venue)
- Ynares Sports Arena (opening day)

"Spike on Tour" venues

- Strike Gymnasium - Bacoor, Cavite
- Malolos Sports and Convention Center - Malolos, Bulacan
- Muntinlupa Sports Complex - Muntinlupa
- Alonte Sports Arena - Biñan, Laguna

== Broadcast partners ==
- ESPN 5, 5 Plus, One Sports
