= 2017 Philippine Super Liga Beach Volleyball Challenge Cup =

Third edition of the Philippine Super Liga beach volleyball tournament

- Duration: May 4–7, 2017
- Teams: W: 12 (Note: Eight teams; twelve separate squads); M: 9 (Note: Seven teams; nine separate squads)
- TV partner(s): TV5, AksyonTV, Sports5.ph

Results
- Champions: W: Petron Sprint 4T; M: Generika–Ayala Lifesavers
- Runners-up: W: Generika–Ayala Lifesavers (A); M: Cignal HD Spikers
- Third place: W: Petron XCS; M: SM By The Bay
- Fourth place: W: Sta. Lucia Lady Realtors; M: UPHSD Altas (A)

PSL Beach Volleyball Challenge Cup chronology
- < 2016 2018 >

PSL conference chronology
- < 2017 Invitational 2017 All-Filipino >

The 2017 Philippine Super Liga Beach Volleyball Challenge Cup (also known as the 2017 Belo Philippine Super Liga Beach Volleyball Challenge Cup due to sponsorship reasons) was the third running of the Philippine Super Liga Beach Volleyball Challenge Cup and the second tournament of the 2017 season. The conference ran from May 4 to 7, 2017 at The Sands, SM By The Bay (SM Mall of Asia).

== Women's Division ==
2017 PSL Beach Volleyball Challenge Cup teams (Women's Division)
| Abbr. | Team | Company | Colors | Players |
|---|---|---|---|---|
| CIG-A | Cignal HD Spikers (Team A) | Cignal TV, Inc. | | Jovelyn Gonzaga and Maica Morada |
| CIG-B | Cignal HD Spikers (Team B) | Cignal TV, Inc. | | Janine Marciano and Mylene Paat |
| CCL | COCOLIFE Asset Managers | United Coconut Planters Life Assurance Corporation | | Abie Nuval and Wensh Tiu |
| F2L-A | F2 Logistics Cargo Movers (Team A) | F2 Global Logistics, Inc. | | Cyd Demecillo and Fritz Gallenero |
| F2L-B | F2 Logistics Cargo Movers (Team B) | F2 Global Logistics, Inc. | | Aby Maraño and Cha Cruz |
| FOT | Foton Tornadoes | United Asia Automotive Group, Inc. | | Kathleen Barrinuevo and Cherilyn Sindayen |
| GEN-A | Generika-Ayala Lifesavers (Team A) | Erikagen, Inc. | | Patty Orendain and Fiola Ceballos |
| GEN-B | Generika-Ayala Lifesavers (Team B) | Erikagen, Inc. | | Rosalie Pepito and Kathleen Arado |
| PET-A | Petron Sprint 4T | Petron Corporation | | Sisi Rondina and Bernadeth Pons |
| PET-B | Petron XCS | Petron Corporation | | Frances Molina and Bang Pineda |
| SLR | Sta. Lucia Lady Realtors | Sta. Lucia Realty and Development Corporation | | Danika Gendrauli and Jackilyn Estoquia |
| UPH | UPHSD Lady Altas | University of Perpetual Help System DALTA | | Marijo Medalla and Bianca Tripoli |

=== Preliminary round ===
==== Pool A ====
| Pos | Team | Pld | W | L | Pts | SW | SL | SR | SPW | SPL | SPR | Qualification |
|---|---|---|---|---|---|---|---|---|---|---|---|---|
| 1 | Cignal "A" (CIG-A) | 2 | 2 | 0 | 6 | 4 | 1 | 4.000 | 93 | 66 | 1.409 | Quarterfinals |
| 2 | UPHS-D (UPH) | 2 | 1 | 1 | 3 | 2 | 2 | 1.000 | 69 | 77 | 0.896 | Quarterfinals |
| 3 | Generika-Ayala "B" (GEN-B) | 2 | 0 | 2 | 0 | 1 | 4 | 0.250 | 74 | 93 | 0.796 | |

| Date | Time | | Score | | Set 1 | Set 2 | Set 3 | Total | Report |
|---|---|---|---|---|---|---|---|---|---|
| 04 May | 15:00 | UPH | 2–0 | GEN-B | 21–19 | 21–16 | | 42–35 | |
| 04 May | 19:00 | GEN-B | 1–2 | CIG-A | 10–21 | 21–15 | 8–15 | 39–51 | |
| 05 May | 18:00 | CIG-A | 2–0 | UPH | 21–11 | 21–16 | | 42–27 | |

==== Pool B ====
| Pos | Team | Pld | W | L | Pts | SW | SL | SR | SPW | SPL | SPR | Qualification |
|---|---|---|---|---|---|---|---|---|---|---|---|---|
| 1 | Petron Sprint 4T (PET-A) | 2 | 2 | 0 | 6 | 4 | 0 | MAX | 83 | 37 | 2.243 | Quarterfinals |
| 2 | COCOLIFE (CCL) | 2 | 1 | 1 | 3 | 2 | 3 | 0.667 | 61 | 96 | 0.635 | Quarterfinals |
| 3 | F2 Logistics "A" (F2L-A) | 2 | 0 | 2 | 0 | 1 | 4 | 0.250 | 70 | 95 | 0.737 | |

| Date | Time | | Score | | Set 1 | Set 2 | Set 3 | Total | Report |
|---|---|---|---|---|---|---|---|---|---|
| 04 May | 16:00 | F2L-A | 1–2 | CCL | 21–15 | 18–21 | 15–17 | 54–53 | |
| 04 May | 20:00 | PET-A | 2–0 | F2L-A | 21–9 | 21–7 | | 42–16 | |
| 05 May | 17:00 | CCL | 0–2 | PET-A | 8–21 | 13–21 | | 21–42 | |

==== Pool C ====
| Pos | Team | Pld | W | L | Pts | SW | SL | SR | SPW | SPL | SPR | Qualification |
|---|---|---|---|---|---|---|---|---|---|---|---|---|
| 1 | Generika-Ayala "A" (GEN-A) | 2 | 2 | 0 | 6 | 4 | 0 | MAX | 84 | 59 | 1.424 | Quarterfinals |
| 2 | Cignal "B" (CIG-B) | 2 | 1 | 1 | 3 | 2 | 3 | 0.667 | 95 | 98 | 0.969 | Quarterfinals |
| 3 | F2 Logistics "B" (F2L-B) | 2 | 0 | 2 | 0 | 1 | 4 | 0.250 | 80 | 102 | 0.784 | |

| Date | Time | | Score | | Set 1 | Set 2 | Set 3 | Total | Report |
|---|---|---|---|---|---|---|---|---|---|
| 04 May | 17:00 | CIG-B | 0–2 | GEN-A | 18–21 | 17–21 | | 35–42 | |
| 05 May | 15:00 | F2L-B | 1–2 | CIG-B | 10–21 | 26–24 | 10–15 | 56–60 | |
| 05 May | 19:00 | GEN-A | 2–0 | F2L-B | 21–12 | 21–12 | | 42–24 | |

==== Pool D ====
| Pos | Team | Pld | W | L | Pts | SW | SL | SR | SPW | SPL | SPR | Qualification |
|---|---|---|---|---|---|---|---|---|---|---|---|---|
| 1 | Petron XCS (PET-B) | 2 | 2 | 0 | 6 | 4 | 2 | 2.000 | 108 | 86 | 1.256 | Quarterfinals |
| 2 | Sta. Lucia Lady Realtors (SLR) | 2 | 1 | 1 | 3 | 3 | 2 | 1.500 | 86 | 85 | 1.012 | Quarterfinals |
| 3 | Foton (FOT) | 2 | 0 | 2 | 0 | 1 | 4 | 0.250 | 74 | 97 | 0.763 | |

| Date | Time | | Score | | Set 1 | Set 2 | Set 3 | Total | Report |
|---|---|---|---|---|---|---|---|---|---|
| 04 May | 18:00 | FOT | 1–2 | PET-B | 11–21 | 21–19 | 10–15 | 42–55 | |
| 05 May | 16:00 | FOT | 0–2 | SLR | 16–21 | 16–21 | | 32–42 | |
| 05 May | 20:00 | PET-B | 2–1 | SLR | 17–21 | 21–10 | 15–13 | 53–44 | |

=== Playoffs ===
Quarter-finals
B1 | Petron Sprint 4T | 21 | 21
C2 | Cignal "B" | 11 | 9
D1 | Petron XCS | 20 | 21 | 15
B2 | COCOLIFE | 22 | 14 | 13
A1 | Cignal "A" | 21 | 23 | 11
D2 | Sta. Lucia | 19 | 25 | 15
C1 | Generika-Ayala "A" | 21 | 21
A2 | UPHS-D | 11 | 12

Semi-finals
B1 | Petron Sprint 4T | 21 | 21
D1 | Petron XCS | 17 | 13
D2 | Sta. Lucia | 15 | 11
C1 | Generika-Ayala "A" | 21 | 21

Final
B1 | Petron Sprint 4T | 21 | 21
C1 | Generika-Ayala "A" | 12 | 18
Bronze medal match
D1 | Petron XCS | 10 | 21 | 15
D2 | Sta. Lucia Lady Realtors | 21 | 14 | 8

==== Quarterfinals ====
| Date | Time | | Score | | Set 1 | Set 2 | Set 3 | Total | Report |
|---|---|---|---|---|---|---|---|---|---|
| 06 May | 14:00 | PET-A | 2–0 | CIG-B | 21–11 | 21–9 | | 42–20 | |
| 06 May | 15:00 | PET-B | 2–1 | CCL | 20–22 | 21–14 | 15–13 | 56–49 | |
| 06 May | 16:00 | CIG-A | 1–2 | SLR | 21–19 | 23–25 | 11–15 | 55–59 | |
| 06 May | 17:00 | GEN-A | 2–0 | UPH | 21–11 | 21–12 | | 42–23 | |

| Date | Time | | Score | | Set 1 | Set 2 | Set 3 | Total | Report |
|---|---|---|---|---|---|---|---|---|---|
| 06 May | 18:00 | CIG-B | 0–0 | CCL | 0–0 | 0–0 | | 0–0 | |
| 06 May | 19:00 | CIG-A | 0–0 | UPH | 0–0 | 0–0 | | 0–0 | |

==== For 7th place ====
| Date | Time | | Score | | Set 1 | Set 2 | Set 3 | Total | Report |
|---|---|---|---|---|---|---|---|---|---|
| 07 May | 08:00 | CCL | 0–2 | UPH | 13–21 | 19–21 | | 32–42 | |

==== For 5th place ====
| Date | Time | | Score | | Set 1 | Set 2 | Set 3 | Total | Report |
|---|---|---|---|---|---|---|---|---|---|
| 07 May | 10:00 | CIG-B | 1–2 | CIG-A | 15–21 | 28–26 | 11–15 | 54–62 | |

==== Semi-finals ====
| Date | Time | | Score | | Set 1 | Set 2 | Set 3 | Total | Report |
|---|---|---|---|---|---|---|---|---|---|
| 07 May | 11:00 | PET-A | 2–0 | PET-B | 21–17 | 21–13 | | 42–30 | |
| 07 May | 12:00 | SLR | 0–2 | GEN-A | 15–21 | 11–21 | | 26–42 | |

==== For 3rd place ====
| Date | Time | | Score | | Set 1 | Set 2 | Set 3 | Total | Report |
|---|---|---|---|---|---|---|---|---|---|
| 07 May | 17:00 | PET-B | 2–1 | SLR | 10–21 | 21–14 | 15–8 | 46–43 | |

==== Women's Finals ====
| Date | Time | | Score | | Set 1 | Set 2 | Set 3 | Total | Report |
|---|---|---|---|---|---|---|---|---|---|
| 07 May | 19:00 | PET-A | 2–0 | GEN-A | 21–12 | 21–18 | | 42–30 | |

=== Final standing ===
| Rank | Team |
|---|---|
| 1st place, gold medalist(s) | Petron Sprint 4T |
| 2nd place, silver medalist(s) | Generika-Ayala Lifesavers (Team A) |
| 3rd place, bronze medalist(s) | Petron XCS |
| 4 | Sta. Lucia Lady Realtors |
| 5 | Cignal HD Spikers (Team A) |
| 6 | Cignal HD Spikers (Team B) |
| 7 | UPHS-D Lady Altas |
| 8 | COCOLIFE Asset Managers |
| 9 | Generika-Ayala Lifesavers (Team B) |
| 10 | F2 Logistics Cargo Movers (Team B) |
| 11 | Foton Tornadoes |
| 12 | F2 Logistics Cargo Movers (Team A) |

2017 Philippine Super Liga Beach Challenge Cup
Petron Sprint 4T
1st title (Beach)
Team Roster
Sisi Rondina and Bernadeth Pons

== Men's Division ==
2017 PSL Beach Volleyball Challenge Cup teams (Men's Division)
| Abbr. | Team | Company | Colors | Players |
|---|---|---|---|---|
| CIG | Cignal HD Spikers | Cignal TV, Inc. | | Joseph Ramos and Edmar Bonono |
| GEN | Generika-Ayala Lifesavers | Erikagen, Inc. | | Anthony Arbasto and Calvin Sarte |
| IEM-A | IEM Volley Masters (Team A) | Instituto Estetico Manila | | Arjay Salcedo and Romnick Samson |
| IEM-B | IEM Volley Masters (Team B) | Instituto Estetico Manila | | Michael Zamora and Carlito Delito |
| SM | SM By The Bay | SM Prime Holdings | | J. Natividad and B. Bagunas |
| TVM | Team Volleyball Manila | Team Volleyball Manila | | Arjay Onia and Geraint Bacon |
| UPH-A | UPHSD Altas (Team A) | University of Perpetual Help System DALTA | | Rey Taneo and Relan Taneo |
| UPH-B | UPHSD Altas (Team B) | University of Perpetual Help System DALTA | | Jay Jay Solamilio and Joebert Almodiel |
| WAY | Wayuk | | | Emmanuel Gamat and Conrad Cabrera |

=== Preliminary round ===
==== Pool A ====
| Pos | Team | Pld | W | L | Pts | SW | SL | SR | SPW | SPL | SPR | Qualification |
|---|---|---|---|---|---|---|---|---|---|---|---|---|
| 1 | Generika-Ayala (GEN) | 0 | 0 | 0 | 0 | 0 | 0 | — | 0 | 0 | — | Semifinals |
| 2 | Cignal (CIG) | 0 | 0 | 0 | 0 | 0 | 0 | — | 0 | 0 | — | Semifinals |
| 3 | UPHS-D Altas "B" (UPH-B) | 0 | 0 | 0 | 0 | 0 | 0 | — | 0 | 0 | — | |
| 4 | IEM "A" (IEM-A) | 0 | 0 | 0 | 0 | 0 | 0 | — | 0 | 0 | — | |
| 5 | Wayuk (WAY) | 0 | 0 | 0 | 0 | 0 | 0 | — | 0 | 0 | — | |

| Date | Time | | Score | | Set 1 | Set 2 | Set 3 | Total | Report |
|---|---|---|---|---|---|---|---|---|---|
| 04 May | 07:30 | WAY | 0–0 | IEM-A | 0–0 | 0–0 | | 0–0 | |
| 04 May | 09:10 | CIG | 0–0 | UPH-B | 0–0 | 0–0 | | 0–0 | |
| 04 May | 10:00 | GEN | 0–0 | WAY | 0–0 | 0–0 | | 0–0 | |
| 04 May | 11:40 | UPH-B | 0–0 | WAY | 0–0 | 0–0 | | 0–0 | |
| 04 May | 14:10 | IEM-A | 0–0 | GEN | 0–0 | 0–0 | | 0–0 | |
| 05 May | 07:30 | CIG | 2–0 | WAY | 21–9 | 21–10 | | 42–19 | |
| 05 May | 09:10 | UPH-B | 0–2 | GEN | 13–21 | 8–21 | | 21–42 | |
| 05 May | 10:00 | IEM-A | 0–2 | CIG | 14–21 | 11–21 | | 25–42 | |
| 05 May | 11:40 | WAY | 0–2 | UPH-B | 6–21 | 12–21 | | 18–42 | |
| 05 May | 13:20 | CIG | 1–3 | GEN | 14–21 | 31–29 | 7–15 | 52–65 | |

==== Pool B ====
| Pos | Team | Pld | W | L | Pts | SW | SL | SR | SPW | SPL | SPR | Qualification |
|---|---|---|---|---|---|---|---|---|---|---|---|---|
| 1 | SM By The Bay (SM) | 0 | 0 | 0 | 0 | 0 | 0 | — | 0 | 0 | — | Semifinals |
| 2 | UPHS-D Altas "A" (UPH-A) | 0 | 0 | 0 | 0 | 0 | 0 | — | 0 | 0 | — | Semifinals |
| 3 | Team Volleyball Manila (TVM) | 0 | 0 | 0 | 0 | 0 | 0 | — | 0 | 0 | — | |
| 4 | IEM "B" (IEM-B) | 0 | 0 | 0 | 0 | 0 | 0 | — | 0 | 0 | — | |

| Date | Time | | Score | | Set 1 | Set 2 | Set 3 | Total | Report |
|---|---|---|---|---|---|---|---|---|---|
| 04 May | 08:20 | IEM-B | 0–0 | SM | 0–0 | 0–0 | | 0–0 | |
| 04 May | 10:50 | SM | 0–0 | TVM | 0–0 | 0–0 | | 0–0 | |
| 04 May | 13:20 | IEM-B | 0–0 | UPH-A | 0–0 | 0–0 | | 0–0 | |
| 05 May | 08:20 | TVM | 0–2 | IEM-B | 20–22 | 16–21 | | 36–43 | |
| 05 May | 10:50 | TVM | 0–2 | UPH-A | 16–21 | 11–21 | | 27–42 | |
| 05 May | 14:10 | SM | 2–0 | UPH-A | 21–20 | 21–14 | | 42–34 | |

=== Playoffs ===
Semifinals
06 May
Generika-Ayala | 0
UPHS-D "A" | 0
06 May
SM | 0
Cignal | 0

Final
07 May
Generika-Ayala | 1
Cignal | 0
3rd place match
07 May
UPHS-D "A" | 0
SM | 1

==== Semi-finals ====
| Date | Time | | Score | | Set 1 | Set 2 | Set 3 | Total | Report |
|---|---|---|---|---|---|---|---|---|---|
| 06 May | 10:00 | GEN | 0–0 | UPH-A | 0–0 | 0–0 | 0–0 | 0–0 | |
| 06 May | 11:00 | SM | 0–0 | CIG | 0–0 | 0–0 | 0–0 | 0–0 | |

==== For 3rd place ====
| Date | Time | | Score | | Set 1 | Set 2 | Set 3 | Total | Report |
|---|---|---|---|---|---|---|---|---|---|
| 07 May | 14:00 | UPH-A | 0–2 | SM | 19–21 | 21–23 | | 40–44 | |

==== Men's Finals ====
| Date | Time | | Score | | Set 1 | Set 2 | Set 3 | Total | Report |
|---|---|---|---|---|---|---|---|---|---|
| 07 May | 16:00 | GEN | 2–0 | CIG | 21–17 | 21–18 | | 42–35 | |

=== Final standing ===
| Rank | Team |
|---|---|
| 1st place, gold medalist(s) | Generika-Ayala Lifesavers |
| 2nd place, silver medalist(s) | Cignal HD Spikers |
| 3rd place, bronze medalist(s) | SM By The Bay |
| 4 | UPHS-D Altas (Team A) |
| 5 | |
| 6 | |
| 7 | |
| 8 | |
| 9 | |

2017 Philippine Super Liga Beach Challenge Cup
Generika-Ayala Lifesavers
1st title (Beach)
Team Roster
Anthony Arbastro and Calvin Sarte

== Celebrity match ==
Team Ara (ARA):

- Ara Galang
- Dianne Medina
- Almira Teng
- Nikko Huelgas

Team Den (DEN):

- Denden Lazaro
- RR Enriquez
- Amanda Fernandez
- Mich del Carmen

Team Kim (KIM):

- Kim Fajardo
- Aubrey Miles
- Jacq Yu
- Mark Neumann

Team Rachel (RAD):

- Rachel Daquis
- Karla Aguas
- Jeck Dionela
- Malak So

| Date | Time | | Score | | Set 1 | Set 2 | Set 3 | Total | Report |
|---|---|---|---|---|---|---|---|---|---|
| 06 May | 18:00 | DEN | 2–0 | RAD | 21–17 | 21–19 | | 42–36 | |
| 07 May | 18:00 | ARA | 1–1 | KIM | 17–21 | 21–14 | | 38–35 | |

== Venue ==
- The Sands (SM By The Bay, SM Mall of Asia)

== Broadcast partners ==
- TV5, AksyonTV, Sports5.ph
