= 2018 Philippine Super Liga Beach Volleyball Challenge Cup =

Fourth edition of the Philippine Super Liga beach volleyball tournament

- Duration: May 23–27, 2018
- Teams: W: 12 (Note: Eight teams; twelve separate squads); M: 8
- TV partner(s): ESPN 5, AksyonTV, Hyper, ESPN5.com

Results
- Champions: W: Petron XCS; M: Foton Tornadoes
- Runners-up: W: Sta. Lucia Lady Realtors (A); M: Sands SM By The Bay
- Third place: W: Generika–Ayala Lifesavers (A); M: Smart Prepaid Giga Hitters
- Fourth place: W: F2 Logistics Cargo Movers; M: Cignal HD Spikers

PSL Beach Volleyball Challenge Cup chronology
- < 2017 2019 >

PSL conference chronology
- < 2018 Grand Prix 2018 Invitational >

The 2018 Philippine Super Liga Beach Volleyball Challenge Cup was the fourth running of the Philippine Super Liga Beach Volleyball Challenge Cup and the second tournament of the 2018 season. The tournament was held at the Sands SM By the Bay, Mall of Asia Complex, Pasay from May 23–27, 2018.

== Women's ==
2018 PSL Beach Volleyball Challenge Cup teams (Women's Division)
| Abbr. | Team | Company | Colors | Players |
|---|---|---|---|---|
| CIG | Cignal HD Spikers | Cignal TV, Inc. | | Team A: Mylene Paat and Raphil Aguilar; Team B: Cherry May Vivas and Jannine Navarro |
| CCL | COCOLIFE Asset Managers | United Coconut Planters Life Assurance Corporation | | Team A: Danika Gendrauli and Nerissa Bautista; Team B: Marge Tejada and Alexandria Denice Tan |
| F2L | F2 Logistics Cargo Movers | F2 Global Logistics Inc. | | Fritz Joy Gallenero and Michelle Morente |
| FOT | Foton Tornadoes Blue Energy | United Asia Automotive Group, Inc. | | Maria Nieza Viray and Jiziela Viray |
| GEN | Generika-Ayala Lifesavers | Actimed, Inc. | | Team A: Patty Jane Orendain and Fiola Ceballos; Team B: Sheeka Gin Espinosa and Shiela Marie Pineda |
| PET | Petron XCS | Petron Corporation | | Cherry Ann Rondina and Bernadeth Pons |
| SMA | Smart Prepaid Giga Hitters | Smart Communications | | Maria Cecilla Bangad and Caitlin Viray |
| SLR | Sta. Lucia Lady Realtors | Sta. Lucia Realty and Development Corporation | | Team A: Dhannylaine Demontano and Jackielyn Estoquia; Team B: Jonah Sabete and Bianca Lizares |

=== Preliminary round ===
==== Pool A ====
| Pos | Team | Pld | W | L | Pts | SW | SL | SR | SPW | SPL | SPR | Qualification |
|---|---|---|---|---|---|---|---|---|---|---|---|---|
| 1 | Petron (PET) | 2 | 2 | 0 | 6 | 4 | 2 | 2.000 | 110 | 86 | 1.279 | Quarterfinals |
| 2 | Generika-Ayala "A" (GEN-A) | 2 | 1 | 1 | 3 | 3 | 2 | 1.500 | 68 | 97 | 0.701 | Quarterfinals |
| 3 | COCOLIFE "A" (CCL-A) | 2 | 0 | 2 | 0 | 1 | 4 | 0.250 | 85 | 80 | 1.063 | |

| Date | Time | | Score | | Set 1 | Set 2 | Set 3 | Total | Report |
|---|---|---|---|---|---|---|---|---|---|
| 23 May | 14:15 | PET | 2–1 | GEN-A | 19–21 | 21–14 | 15-8 | 55–43 | |
| 23 May | 18:15 | CCL-A | 1–2 | PET | 21–19 | 14–21 | 8-15 | 43–55 | |
| 24 May | 16:15 | GEN-A | 2–0 | CCL-A | 21–7 | 21–18 | | 42–25 | |

==== Pool B ====
| Pos | Team | Pld | W | L | Pts | SW | SL | SR | SPW | SPL | SPR | Qualification |
|---|---|---|---|---|---|---|---|---|---|---|---|---|
| 1 | Sta. Lucia "A" (SLR-A) | 2 | 2 | 0 | 6 | 4 | 1 | 4.000 | 92 | 78 | 1.179 | Quarterfinals |
| 2 | Cignal "A" (CIG-A) | 2 | 1 | 1 | 3 | 3 | 3 | 1.000 | 87 | 104 | 0.837 | Quarterfinals |
| 3 | Generika-Ayala "B" (GEN-B) | 2 | 0 | 2 | 0 | 1 | 4 | 0.250 | 87 | 84 | 1.036 | |

| Date | Time | | Score | | Set 1 | Set 2 | Set 3 | Total | Report |
|---|---|---|---|---|---|---|---|---|---|
| 23 May | 15:15 | CIG-A | 2–1 | GEN-B | 21–19 | 5–21 | 16-14 | 42–54 | |
| 23 May | 19:15 | SLR-A | 2–1 | CIG-A | 14–21 | 21–19 | 15-5 | 50–45 | |
| 24 May | 17:15 | GEN-B | 0–2 | SLR-A | 14–21 | 19–21 | | 33–42 | |

==== Pool C ====
| Pos | Team | Pld | W | L | Pts | SW | SL | SR | SPW | SPL | SPR | Qualification |
|---|---|---|---|---|---|---|---|---|---|---|---|---|
| 1 | Foton (FOT) | 2 | 2 | 0 | 6 | 4 | 0 | MAX | 84 | 60 | 1.400 | Quarterfinals |
| 2 | Cignal "B" (CIG-B) | 2 | 1 | 1 | 3 | 2 | 3 | 0.667 | 88 | 96 | 0.917 | Quarterfinals |
| 3 | Smart (SMA) | 2 | 0 | 2 | 0 | 1 | 4 | 0.250 | 81 | 97 | 0.835 | |

| Date | Time | | Score | | Set 1 | Set 2 | Set 3 | Total | Report |
|---|---|---|---|---|---|---|---|---|---|
| 23 May | 16:15 | FOT | 2–0 | CIG-B | 21–16 | 21–17 | | 42–33 | |
| 24 May | 14:15 | SMA | 0–2 | FOT | 10–21 | 17–21 | | 27–42 | |
| 24 May | 18:15 | CIG-B | 2–1 | SMA | 18–21 | 22–20 | 15-13 | 55–54 | |

==== Pool D ====
| Pos | Team | Pld | W | L | Pts | SW | SL | SR | SPW | SPL | SPR | Qualification |
|---|---|---|---|---|---|---|---|---|---|---|---|---|
| 1 | F2 Logistics (F2L) | 2 | 2 | 0 | 6 | 4 | 0 | MAX | 84 | 58 | 1.448 | Quarterfinals |
| 2 | Sta. Lucia "B" (SLR-B) | 2 | 1 | 1 | 3 | 2 | 2 | 1.000 | 73 | 78 | 0.936 | Quarterfinals |
| 3 | COCOLIFE "B" (CCL-B) | 2 | 0 | 2 | 0 | 0 | 4 | 0.000 | 78 | 73 | 1.068 | |

| Date | Time | | Score | | Set 1 | Set 2 | Set 3 | Total | Report |
|---|---|---|---|---|---|---|---|---|---|
| 23 May | 17:15 | CCL-B | 0–2 | SLR-B | 20–21 | 16–21 | | 36–42 | |
| 24 May | 15:15 | F2L | 2–0 | CCL-B | 21–16 | 21–11 | | 42–27 | |
| 24 May | 19:15 | SLR-B | 0–2 | F2L | 16–21 | 15–21 | | 31–42 | |

=== Playoffs ===
Quarter-finals
B1 | Sta. Lucia "A" | 21 | 21
C2 | Cignal "B" | 10 | 13
D1 | F2 Logistics | 18 | 21 | 16
B2 | Cignal "A" | 21 | 15 | 14
A1 | Petron | 21 | 21
D2 | Sta. Lucia "B" | 5 | 11
C1 | Foton | 19 | 18
A2 | Generika-Ayala "A" | 21 | 21

Semi-finals
B1 | Sta. Lucia "A" | 21 | 21
D1 | F2 Logistics | 11 | 15
A1 | Petron | 21 | 21
A2 | Generika-Ayala "A" | 9 | 16

Final
B1 | Sta. Lucia "A" | 8 | 11
A1 | Petron | 21 | 21
Bronze medal match
D1 | F2 Logistics | 7 | 14
A2 | Generika-Ayala "A" | 21 | 21

==== Quarterfinals ====
| Date | Time | | Score | | Set 1 | Set 2 | Set 3 | Total | Report |
|---|---|---|---|---|---|---|---|---|---|
| 26 May | 10:00 | SLR-A | 2–0 | CIG-B | 21–10 | 21–13 | | 42–23 | |
| 26 May | 11:00 | F2L | 2–1 | CIG-A | 18–21 | 21–15 | 16-14 | 55–50 | |
| 26 May | 15:00 | PET | 2–0 | SLR-B | 21–5 | 21–11 | | 42–16 | |
| 26 May | 17:00 | FOT | 0–2 | GEN-A | 19–21 | 18–21 | | 37–42 | |

| Date | Time | | Score | | Set 1 | Set 2 | Set 3 | Total | Report |
|---|---|---|---|---|---|---|---|---|---|
| 26 May | 18:00 | SLR-A | 2–0 | F2L | 21–11 | 21–15 | | 42–26 | |
| 26 May | 19:00 | PET | 2–0 | GEN-A | 21–9 | 21–16 | | 42–25 | |
| 27 May | 08:00 | CIG-B | 1–2 | CIG-A | 23–21 | 14–21 | 13–15 | 50–57 | |
| 27 May | 19:00 | SLR-B | 1–2 | FOT | 12–21 | 21–19 | 12–15 | 45–55 | |

==== For 7th place ====
| Date | Time | | Score | | Set 1 | Set 2 | Set 3 | Total | Report |
|---|---|---|---|---|---|---|---|---|---|
| 27 May | 10:00 | CIG-B | 0–2 | SLR-B | 11–21 | 11–21 | | 22–42 | |

==== For 5th place ====
| Date | Time | | Score | | Set 1 | Set 2 | Set 3 | Total | Report |
|---|---|---|---|---|---|---|---|---|---|
| 27 May | 11:00 | CIG-A | 1–2 | FOT | 15–21 | 21–19 | 13–15 | 49–55 | |

==== For 3rd place ====
| Date | Time | | Score | | Set 1 | Set 2 | Set 3 | Total | Report |
|---|---|---|---|---|---|---|---|---|---|
| 27 May | 14:30 | F2L | 0–2 | GEN-A | 7–21 | 14–21 | | 21–42 | |

==== Women's Finals ====
| Date | Time | | Score | | Set 1 | Set 2 | Set 3 | Total | Report |
|---|---|---|---|---|---|---|---|---|---|
| 27 May | 17:30 | SLR-A | 0–2 | PET | 8–21 | 11–21 | | 19–42 | |

=== Final standing ===
| Rank | Team |
|---|---|
| 1st place, gold medalist(s) | Petron XCS |
| 2nd place, silver medalist(s) | Sta. Lucia Lady Realtors (Team A) |
| 3rd place, bronze medalist(s) | Generika-Ayala Lifesavers (Team A) |
| 4 | F2 Logistics Cargo Movers |
| 5 | Foton Tornadoes |
| 6 | Cignal HD Spikers (Team A) |
| 7 | Sta. Lucia Lady Realtors (Team B) |
| 8 | Cignal HD Spikers (Team B) |

2018 Philippine Super Liga Beach Challenge Cup
Petron XCS
2nd title (Beach)
Team Roster
Sisi Rondina and Bernadeth Pons

== Men's ==
2018 PSL Beach Volleyball Challenge Cup teams (Men's Division)
| Abbr. | Team | Company | Colors | Players |
|---|---|---|---|---|
| CIG | Cignal HD Spikers | Cignal TV, Inc. | | Mike Abria and Jessie Lopez |
| CCL | COCOLIFE Asset Managers | United Coconut Planters Life Assurance Corporation | | Joshua Ylaya and JP Pareja |
| FOT | Foton Tornadoes Blue Energy | United Asia Automotive Group, Inc. | | Kris Roy de Guzman and Lemuel Arbasto |
| NVY | Philippine Navy | Philippine Navy | | Alsali Pajiji and Milover Parcon |
| SMA | Smart Prepaid Giga Hitters | Smart Communications | | Philip Michael Bagalay and Gregory Utupo |
| SND | Sands SM by the Bay | SM Prime Holdings | | Bryan Bagunas and James Natividad |
| TVM | Team Volleyball Manila | Team Volleyball Manila | | Joven Camaganakan and Joseph Tipay |
| UST | UST Growling Tigers | University of Santo Tomas | | Ian Lester Lee and Romnick Rico |

=== Preliminary round ===
==== Pool A ====
| Pos | Team | Pld | W | L | Pts | SW | SL | SR | SPW | SPL | SPR | Qualification |
|---|---|---|---|---|---|---|---|---|---|---|---|---|
| 1 | Sands SM (SND) | 3 | 3 | 0 | 9 | 6 | 0 | MAX | 126 | 89 | 1.416 | Semifinals |
| 2 | Foton (FOT) | 3 | 2 | 1 | 6 | 4 | 2 | 2.000 | 118 | 81 | 1.457 | Semifinals |
| 3 | UST (UST) | 3 | 1 | 2 | 3 | 2 | 4 | 0.500 | 101 | 114 | 0.886 | |
| 4 | COCOLIFE (CCL) | 3 | 0 | 3 | 0 | 0 | 6 | 0.000 | 65 | 126 | 0.516 | |

| Date | Time | | Score | | Set 1 | Set 2 | Set 3 | Total | Report |
|---|---|---|---|---|---|---|---|---|---|
| 23 May | 08:00 | FOT | 2–0 | CCL | 21–15 | 21–7 | | 42–12 | |
| 23 May | 09:30 | UST | 0–2 | SND | 15–21 | 17–21 | | 32–42 | |
| 23 May | 11:00 | FOT | 0–2 | SND | 19–21 | 15–21 | | 34–42 | |
| 24 May | 08:00 | CCL | 0–2 | UST | 12–21 | 8–21 | | 30–42 | |
| 24 May | 09:30 | FOT | 2–0 | UST | 21–13 | 21–14 | | 42–27 | |
| 24 May | 11:00 | SND | 2–0 | CCL | 21–10 | 21–13 | | 42–23 | |

==== Pool B ====
| Pos | Team | Pld | W | L | Pts | SW | SL | SR | SPW | SPL | SPR | Qualification |
|---|---|---|---|---|---|---|---|---|---|---|---|---|
| 1 | Cignal (CIG) | 3 | 3 | 0 | 9 | 6 | 1 | 6.000 | 132 | 109 | 1.211 | Semifinals |
| 2 | Smart (SMA) | 3 | 2 | 1 | 6 | 4 | 3 | 1.333 | 122 | 127 | 0.961 | Semifinals |
| 3 | Team Volleyball Manila (TVM) | 3 | 1 | 2 | 3 | 3 | 4 | 0.750 | 121 | 125 | 0.968 | |
| 4 | Philippine Navy (NVY) | 3 | 0 | 3 | 0 | 1 | 6 | 0.167 | 120 | 134 | 0.896 | |

| Date | Time | | Score | | Set 1 | Set 2 | Set 3 | Total | Report |
|---|---|---|---|---|---|---|---|---|---|
| 23 May | 08:45 | TVM | 1–2 | CIG | 21–16 | 14–21 | 9-21 | 44–48 | |
| 23 May | 10:15 | SMA | 2–1 | NVY | 21–19 | 14–21 | 15-10 | 50–50 | |
| 23 May | 11:45 | TVM | 2–0 | NVY | 21–17 | 21–18 | | 42–35 | |
| 24 May | 08:45 | CIG | 2–0 | SMA | 21–14 | 21–16 | | 42–30 | |
| 24 May | 10:15 | TVM | 0–2 | SMA | 15–21 | 20–21 | | 35–42 | |
| 24 May | 11:45 | NVY | 0–2 | CIG | 17–21 | 18–21 | | 35–42 | |

=== Playoffs ===
Semifinals
26 May
Sands SM | 2
Smart | 0
26 May
Cignal | 0
Foton | 2

Final
27 May
Sands SM | 0
Foton | 2
3rd place match
27 May
Smart | 2
Cignal | 0

==== Semi-finals ====
| Date | Time | | Score | | Set 1 | Set 2 | Set 3 | Total | Report |
|---|---|---|---|---|---|---|---|---|---|
| 26 May | 08:00 | SND | 2–0 | SMA | 21–14 | 24–22 | | 45–36 | |
| 26 May | 09:00 | CIG | 0–2 | FOT | 15–21 | 14–21 | | 29–42 | |

==== For 3rd place ====
| Date | Time | | Score | | Set 1 | Set 2 | Set 3 | Total | Report |
|---|---|---|---|---|---|---|---|---|---|
| 26 May | 13:30 | SMA | 2–0 | CIG | 21–15 | 22–20 | | 43–35 | |

==== Men's Finals ====
| Date | Time | | Score | | Set 1 | Set 2 | Set 3 | Total | Report |
|---|---|---|---|---|---|---|---|---|---|
| 27 May | 15:30 | SND | 0–2 | FOT | 15–21 | 15–21 | | 30–42 | |

=== Final standing ===
| Rank | Team |
|---|---|
| 1st place, gold medalist(s) | Foton Tornadoes |
| 2nd place, silver medalist(s) | Sands SM By The Bay |
| 3rd place, bronze medalist(s) | Smart Prepaid Giga Hitters |
| 4 | Cignal HD Spikers |

2018 Philippine Super Liga Beach Challenge Cup
Foton Tornadoes
1st title (Beach)
Team Roster
Lemuel Arbasto and Kris Roy Guzman

== Celebrity match ==
Team Tyang (TYA):

- Aby Maraño
- Abby Poblador
- Yamyam Soy

Team Iumi (IUM):

- Iumi Yongco
- Mich del Carmen
- Troy Montero

Team Jheck (JHE):

- Jheck Dionela
- Stephanie Dods
- KC Montero

Team Buday (BUD):

- Rachel Daquis
- Amanda Fernandez
- Will Devaughn

| Date | Time | | Score | | Set 1 | Set 2 | Set 3 | Total | Report |
|---|---|---|---|---|---|---|---|---|---|
| 26 May | 17:00 | BUD | 2–0 | TYA | 21–18 | 21–18 | | 42–36 | |
| 27 May | 16:30 | IUM | 1–1 | JHE | 19–21 | 21–10 | | 40–31 | |

== Venue ==
- The Sands (SM By The Bay, SM Mall of Asia)

== Broadcast partners ==
- ESPN 5: AksyonTV, Hyper (SD and HD), ESPN5.com
