= 2019 Philippine Super Liga Beach Volleyball Challenge Cup =

Fifth edition of the Philippine Super Liga beach volleyball tournament

- Duration: May 16–18, 2019
- Teams: Women's: 14; Men's 10
- TV partner(s): ESPN 5

Women's division
- Champions: Petron XCS
- Runners-up: Sta. Lucia–Santorini
- Third place: Sta. Lucia–Woodside
- Fourth place: Petron Sprint 4T

Men's division
- Champions: Cignal HD Spikers
- Runners-up: Foton Tornadoes Blue Energy
- Third place: Philippine Army Troopers
- Fourth place: EAC Generals

PSL Beach Volleyball Challenge Cup chronology
- < 2018 2021 >

PSL conference chronology
- < 2019 Grand Prix 2019 All-Filipino >

The 2019 Philippine Super Liga Beach Volleyball Challenge Cup was the fifth running of the Philippine Super Liga Beach Volleyball Challenge Cup and the second tournament of the 2019 season. It was held at the Capitol Resort Hotel, Maniboc, Lingayen, Pangasinan from May 16–18, 2019.

== Women's ==
2019 Philippine Super Liga Beach Volleyball Challenge Cup – Women's division
Abbr.	Team	Affiliation	Players
CIG-A	Cignal HD Spikers (Team A)	Cignal TV, Inc.	Roma Doromal; Klymince Orellaneda
CIG-B	Cignal HD Spikers (Team B)	Cignal TV, Inc.	Mary Landicho; Mary Jolyn Ebro
F2L	F2 Logistics Cargo Movers	F2 Global Logistics Inc.	Michelle Morente; Fritz Joy Gallenero
GEN-A	Generika–Ayala Lifesavers (Team A)	Erikagen, Inc.	Patty Jane Orendain; Fiola Ceballos
GEN-B	Generika–Ayala Lifesavers (Team B)	Erikagen, Inc.	Angeli Araneta; Sheeka Gin Espinosa
PAG	Pangasinan	Province of Pangasinan	Alexies Gonzales; Melanie Ramos
PET-A	Petron XCS	Petron Corporation	Bernadeth Pons; Floremel Rodriguez
PET-B	Petron Sprint 4T	Petron Corporation	Derie Rose Virtusio; Mary Rose Jauculan
PLDT-A	PLDT Home Fibr	PLDT	Grethcel Soltones; Shola Alvarez
PLDT-B	Smart GigaX	PLDT / Smart Communications	Jasmine Nabor; Alyssa Eroa
SLR-A	Sta. Lucia-Woodside	Sta. Lucia Realty and Development Corporation	Bianca Lizares; Jennifer Cosas
SLR-B	Sta. Lucia-Santorini	Sta. Lucia Realty and Development Corporation	Jackielyn Estoquia; Dhannylaine Demontaño
UVC-A	United Volleyball Club (Team A)	United Volleyball Club	Bang Pineda; Jinggay Bangad
UVC-B	United Volleyball Club (Team B)	United Volleyball Club	Nieza Viray; Ella Viray

=== Preliminary round ===
==== Pool A ====
Pos	Team	Pld	W	L	Pts	SW	SL	SR	SPW	SPL	SPR	Qualification
1	Petron XCS (PET-A)	3	3	0	6	6	0	MAX	129	92	1.402	Quarterfinals
2	Sta. Lucia-Woodside (SLR-A)	3	2	1	5	4	2	2.000	125	98	1.276	Quarterfinals
3	United Volleyball Club (B) (UVC-B)	3	1	2	4	2	4	0.500	90	111	0.811	
4	PLDT Home Fibr (PLDT-A)	3	0	3	3	0	6	0.000	83	126	0.659	

Date	Time		Score		Set 1	Set 2	Set 3	Total	Report
16 May	07:00	PLDT-A	0–2	UVC-B	8–21	19–21		27–42	
16 May	08:00	PET-A	2–0	SLR-A	21–19	24–22		45–41	
16 May	11:00	SLR-A	2–0	PLDT-A	21–15	21–18		42–33	
16 May	15:00	PET-A	2–0	UVC-B	21–16	21–12		42–28	
17 May	07:00	PET-A	2–0	PLDT-A	21–8	21–15		42–23	
17 May	10:00	SLR-A	2–0	UVC-B	21–13	21–7		42–20	

==== Pool B ====
Pos	Team	Pld	W	L	Pts	SW	SL	SR	SPW	SPL	SPR	Qualification
1	Sta. Lucia-Santorini (SLR-B)	3	3	0	6	6	1	6.000	140	107	1.308	Quarterfinals
2	Petron Sprint 4T (PET-B)	3	2	1	5	4	3	1.333	127	131	0.969	Quarterfinals
3	Cignal HD Spikers (B) (CIG-B)	3	1	2	4	3	4	0.750	120	125	0.960	
4	Generika–Ayala Lifesavers (B) (GEN-B)	3	0	3	3	1	6	0.167	116	140	0.829	

Date	Time		Score		Set 1	Set 2	Set 3	Total	Report
16 May	09:00	SLR-B	2–0	PET-B	21–16	21–17		42–33	
16 May	09:00	GEN-B	0–2	CIG-B	14–21	17–21		31–42	
16 May	13:00	PET-B	2–0	GEN-B	21–18	21–19		42–37	
16 May	17:00	SLR-B	2–0	CIG-B	21–12	21–14		42–26	
17 May	11:00	SLR-B	2–1	GEN-B	21–16	20–22	15–10	56–48	
16 May	12:00	PET-B	2–1	CIG-B	22–20	15–21	15–11	52–52	

==== Pool C ====
Pos	Team	Pld	W	L	Pts	SW	SL	SR	SPW	SPL	SPR	Qualification
1	Generika–Ayala Lifesavers (A) (GEN-A)	2	2	0	4	4	0	MAX	84	48	1.750	Quarterfinals
2	United Volleyball Club (A) (UVC-A)	2	1	1	3	2	2	1.000	72	64	1.125	Quarterfinals
3	Pangasinan (PAG)	2	0	2	2	0	4	0.000	40	84	0.476	

Date	Time		Score		Set 1	Set 2	Set 3	Total	Report
16 May	10:00	GEN-A	2–0	PAG	21–13	21–5		42–18	
16 May	16:00	PAG	0–2	UVC-A	5–21	17–21		22–42	
17 May	09:00	GEN-A	2–0	UVC-A	21–14	21–16		42–30	

==== Pool D ====
Pos	Team	Pld	W	L	Pts	SW	SL	SR	SPW	SPL	SPR	Qualification
1	F2 Logistics Cargo Movers (F2L)	2	2	0	4	4	1	4.000	97	76	1.276	Quarterfinals
2	Cignal HD Spikers (A) (CIG-A)	2	1	1	3	2	2	1.000	76	68	1.118	Quarterfinals
3	Smart GigaX (PLDT-B)	2	0	2	2	1	4	0.250	66	95	0.695	

Date	Time		Score		Set 1	Set 2	Set 3	Total	Report
16 May	10:00	F2L	2–1	PLDT-B	21–11	17-21	15-10	53–42	
16 May	14:00	PLDT-B	0–2	CIG-A	14–21	10–21		24–42	
17 May	08:00	F2L	2–0	CIG-A	21–13	23–21		44–34	

=== Playoffs ===
Quarter-finals
B1	Sta. Lucia-Santorini	21	15	15
C2	United VC (A)	18	21	8
D1	F2 Logistics	11	20
B2	Petron 4T	21	22
A1	Petron XCS	21	21
D2	Cignal (A)	8	12
C1	Generika-Ayala (A)	23	21
A2	Sta. Lucia-Woodside	21	15

Semi-finals
B1	Sta. Lucia-Santorini	21	21
B2	Petron 4T	13	10
A1	Petron XCS	21	21
A2	Sta. Lucia-Woodside	14	14

Final
B1	Sta. Lucia-Santorini	10	14
A1	Petron XCS	21	21
Bronze medal match
B2	Petron 4T	16	21	15
A2	Sta. Lucia-Woodside	21	14	17

==== Quarterfinals ====
Date	Time		Score		Set 1	Set 2	Set 3	Total	Report
17 May	14:00	SLR-B	2–1	UVC-A	21–18	15–21	15–8	51–47	
17 May	15:00	F2L	0–2	PET-B	11–21	20–22		31–43	
17 May	16:00	PET-A	2–0	CIG-A	21–8	21–12		42–20	
17 May	17:00	GEN-A	2–0	SLR-A	23–21	21–15		44–36	

==== 5th–8th classification ====
Date	Time		Score		Set 1	Set 2	Set 3	Total	Report
18 May	07:00	UVC-A	2–1	CIG-A	21–17	16–21	16–14	53–52	
18 May	12:00	F2L	0–2	GEN-A	9–21	14–21		23–42	

==== Semifinals ====
Date	Time		Score		Set 1	Set 2	Set 3	Total	Report
18 May	10:00	SLR-B	2–0	PET-B	21–13	21–10		42–23	
18 May	11:00	PET-A	2–0	SLR-A	21–14	21–14		42–28	

==== Seventh place match ====
Date	Time		Score		Set 1	Set 2	Set 3	Total	Report
18 May	12:00	CIG-A	0–2	F2L	14–21	21–16	15–10	50–47	

==== Fifth place match ====
Date	Time		Score		Set 1	Set 2	Set 3	Total	Report
18 May	13:00	UVC-A	0–2	GEN-A	13–21	12–21	1	25–42	

==== Third place match ====
Date	Time		Score		Set 1	Set 2	Set 3	Total	Report
18 May	13:00	PET-B	1–2	SLR-A	16–21	21–14	15–17	52–52	

==== Finals ====
Date	Time		Score		Set 1	Set 2	Set 3	Total	Report
18 May	16:30	SLR-B	0–2	PET-A	10–21	14–21		24–42	

=== Final standing ===
Rank	Team
1st place, gold medalist(s)	Petron XCS
2nd place, silver medalist(s)	Sta. Lucia-Santorini
3rd place, bronze medalist(s)	Sta. Lucia-Woodside
4	Petron Sprint 4T
5	Generika–Ayala Lifesavers (Team A)
6	United VC (Team A)
7	F2 Logistics Cargo Movers
8	Cignal HD Spikers (Team A)
9	
10	
11	
12	
13	
14	

2019 Philippine Super Liga Beach Challenge Cup
Petron XCS
3rd title (Beach)
Team Roster
Bernadeth Pons
Floremel Rodriguez

== Men's ==
2019 Philippine Super Liga Beach Volleyball Challenge Cup – Men's division
Abbr.	Team	Affiliation	Players
ADM	Ateneo Blue Eagles	Ateneo de Manila University	Luis Alonzo Ligot; Canciano Llenos
CIG	Cignal HD Spikers	Cignal TV, Inc.	Edmar Bonono; Alnakran Abdilla
EAC	EAC Generals	Emilio Aguinaldo College	Joshua Miña; Joshua Pitogo
FOT	Foton Tornadoes Blue Energy	United Asia Automotive Group, Inc.	Kris Guzman; Efraem Dimaculangan
PAG	Pangasinan	Province of Pangasinan	Joseph Harvey; Roniel de Guzman
PA	Philippine Army Troopers	Philippine Army	Jason Lindo Uy; Philip Michael Bagalay
PCU	PCU Dolphins	PCU-Dasmariñas	Jessie dela Cruz; Nastin Gwaza
PNP	PNP Patrollers	Philippine National Police	Darryl Celeste; Johnpaul Geollegue
UPH	UPHSD Altas	University of Perpetual Help System DALTA	Gilbert Balmores; Jayjay Solamillo
VNS	Volleyball Never Stops	Volleyball Never Stops VC	Tony Koyfman; Jeremy Merat

=== Preliminary round ===
==== Pool A ====
Pos	Team	Pld	W	L	Pts	SW	SL	SR	SPW	SPL	SPR	Qualification
1	Cignal HD Spikers (CIG)	4	4	0	8	8	1	8.000	188	138	1.362	Semifinals
2	Foton Tornadoes Blue Energy (FOT)	4	3	1	7	6	3	2.000	169	150	1.127	Semifinals
3	UPHSD Altas (UPH)	4	2	2	6	6	4	1.500	191	145	1.317	
4	Volleyball Never Stops (VNS)	4	1	3	5	2	6	0.333	117	167	0.701	
5	Ateneo Blue Eagles (ADM)	4	0	4	4	0	8	0.000	107	172	0.622	

Date	Time		Score		Set 1	Set 2	Set 3	Total	Report
16 May	12:00	VNS	0–2	FOT	16–21	14–21		30–42	
16 May	15:00	CIG	2–0	ADM	21–10	21–10		42–20	
16 May	17:00	UPH	2–0	VNS	21–8	21–4		42–12	
17 May	08:00	FOT	0–2	CIG	18–21	15–21		44–42	
17 May	11:00	UPH	2–0	ADM	21–8	21–11		42–19	
17 May	13:00	ADM	0–2	FOT	13–21	14–21		27–42	
17 May	15:00	CIG	2–0	VNS	21–15	21–14		42–29	
17 May	16:00	UPH	1–2	FOT	19–21	21–16	11–15	51–52	
18 May	08:00	UPH	1–2	CIG	26–28	21–19	9–15	56–62	
18 May	09:00	VNS	2–0	ADM	25–23	21–18		46–41	

==== Pool B ====
Pos	Team	Pld	W	L	Pts	SW	SL	SR	SPW	SPL	SPR	Qualification
1	Philippine Army Troopers (PA)	4	3	1	7	6	2	3.000	153	118	1.297	Semifinals
2	EAC Generals (EAC)	4	3	1	7	7	2	3.500	175	135	1.296	Semifinals
3	PCU Dolphins (PCU)	4	2	2	6	4	4	1.000	134	108	1.241	
4	PNP Patrollers (PNP)	4	2	2	6	4	6	0.667	159	177	0.898	
5	Pangasinan (PAG)	4	0	4	4	1	8	0.125	98	181	0.541	

Date	Time		Score		Set 1	Set 2	Set 3	Total	Report
16 May	13:00	PA	2–0	PNP	21–10	21–17		42–27	
16 May	14:00	PAG	0–2	EAC	15–21	15–21		30–42	
16 May	16:00	PCU	0–2	PA	13–21	12–21		25–42	
17 May	09:00	PNP	2–1	PAG	19–21	21–13	15–10	55–44	
17 May	10:00	PCU	0–2	EAC	11–21	14–21		25–42	
17 May	12:00	EAC	1–2	PNP	21–17	19–21	9–15	49–53	
17 May	14:00	PAG	0–2	PA	13–21	11–21		24–42	
17 May	17:00	PCU	2–0	PNP	21–9	21–15		42–24	
18 May	08:00	PCU	2–0	PAG	21–0	21–0		42–0	
18 May	09:00	PA	0–2	EAC	12–21	15–21		27–42	

=== Playoffs ===
Semifinals
18 May
Cignal	2
Army	0
18 May
EAC	1
Foton	2

Final
18 May
Cignal	2
Foton	1
3rd place match
18 May
Army	2
EAC	0

==== Semi-finals ====
Date	Time		Score		Set 1	Set 2	Set 3	Total	Report
18 May	10:00	CIG	2–0	PA	21–18	21–14		42–32	
18 May	11:00	EAC	1–2	FOT	14–21	21–13	13–15	48–49	

==== For 3rd place ====
Date	Time		Score		Set 1	Set 2	Set 3	Total	Report
18 May	14:00	PA	2–0	EAC	21–17	21–14		42–31	

==== Men's Finals ====
Date	Time		Score		Set 1	Set 2	Set 3	Total	Report
18 May	15:00	CIG	2–1	FOT	21–18	19–21	19–21	55–52	

=== Final standing ===
Rank	Team
1st place, gold medalist(s)	Cignal HD Spikers
2nd place, silver medalist(s)	Foton Tornadoes Blue Energy
3rd place, bronze medalist(s)	Philippine Army Troopers
4	EAC Generals
5	
6	
7	
8	
9	
10	

2019 Philippine Super Liga Beach Challenge Cup
Cignal HD Spikers
1st title (Beach)
Team Roster
Edmar Bonono
Alnakran Abdilla

== Celebrity match ==
Team Amanda (AMA):

- Amanda Villanueva
- Apple David
- Margo Midwinter
- Aly Borromeo

Team Rachel (RAC):

- Rachel Daquis
- Jinri Park
- Anton del Rosario
- Francoise "DJ Laboching" Fainsan

Date	Time		Score		Set 1	Set 2	Set 3	Total	Report
18 May	17:00	AMA	0–2	RAC	15–16	15–16		30–32	

== Venue ==
- Capitol Resort Hotel, Maniboc, Lingayen, Pangasinan
