= Philippine Super Liga Beach Volleyball Challenge Cup =

Annual beach volleyball tournament

- Sport: Volleyball
- Founded: 2015; 11 years ago
- First season: 2015
- Folded: 2021; 5 years ago
- Most titles: Women: Petron Blaze Spikers (3 titles); Men: five teams (1 title each)

The Philippine Super Liga Beach Volleyball Challenge Cup was an annual beach volleyball tournament hosted by the Philippine Super Liga (PSL) from 2015 to 2021, with the exception of 2020 due to the COVID-19 pandemic. These tournaments featured squads fielded by PSL member teams as well as multiple guest teams.

The tournament featured both a women's and men's division, the latter of which the indoor conferences didn't have since 2015. The 2021 edition only featured a women's tournament and was notably the PSL's final tournament in its history.

== History ==
The Beach Volleyball Challenge Cup was launched in July 2015, with PSL president Tats Suzara stating that the tournament serves a way for the league to scout talents to represent the Philippines in international beach volleyball tournaments. The inaugural edition was held at SM By The Bay, located within the SM Mall of Asia Complex. It featured a total of 22 teams, 13 in the women's division and nine in the men's division.

The next three tournaments from 2016 to 2018 were also held at SM By The Bay. The 2019 edition saw the tournament's first venue change, moving to the Capital Resort Hotel in Lingayen, Pangasinan.

The hosting of the 2020 tournament was heavily affected due to the COVID-19 pandemic, following the league's suspension of play on March 23 that year. The PSL had planned to host the 2020 Challenge Cup in late November, but due to weather conditions that were brought by Super Typhoon Rolly, it was cancelled entirely. A new tournament was held in February 2021 to be played at the Subic Tennis Center, by which point only three of the league's member teams remained. All three teams would leave the league after the 2021 Challenge Cup, making it the last tournament in the Philippine Super Liga's history.

=== List of tournaments ===
Year	Duration	Venue	Location	No. of teams (Note: Some teams chose to field two squads in a single tournament. The first number is the number of squads that took part in that tournament. The number in parenthesis is the actual number of participating teams, counting the two squads as a singular unit.)	
Year	Duration	Venue	Location	W	M
2015	July 18 – August 8, 2015	SM By The Bay	Pasay	13 (11)	9 (7)
2016	May 7–29, 2016	SM By The Bay	Pasay	13 (10)	10 (8)
2017	May 4–7, 2017	SM By The Bay	Pasay	12 (8)	9 (7)
2018	May 23–27, 2018	SM By The Bay	Pasay	12 (8)	8
2019	May 16–18, 2019	Capitol Resort Hotel	Lingayen, Pangasinan	14 (8)	10
2021	February 26–28, 2021	Subic Tennis Center	Olongapo, Zambales	8 (6)	—N/a

== Medal table ==
=== Women's division ===
==== Per year ====
Year	Champions	Runners-up	Third place	Ref.
2015	Giligan's Sisig Queens	Foton Tornadoes	Cignal HD Spikers (B)	
2016	RC Cola–Army Troopers (A)	Foton Toplanders	FEU–Petron	
2017	Petron Sprint 4T	Generika–Ayala Lifesavers (A)	Petron XCS	
2018	Petron XCS	Sta. Lucia Lady Realtors (A)	Generika–Ayala Lifesavers (A)	
2019	Petron XCS	Sta. Lucia–Santorini	Sta. Lucia–Woodside	
2021	Abanse Negrense (A)	Sta. Lucia Lady Realtors (A)	Abanse Negrense (B)	

==== Per franchise ====
The table lists all medals won by a single franchise and not by individual squad.

Franchise	Gold medal	Silver medal	Bronze medal	Total
Petron Blaze Spikers	3	0	1	4
Abanse Negrense	1	0	1	2
Giligan's Sisig Queens	1	0	0	1
Philippine Army Lady Troopers	1	0	0	1
Sta. Lucia Lady Realtors	0	3	1	4
Foton Tornadoes	0	2	0	2
Generika–Ayala Lifesavers	0	1	1	2
Cignal HD Spikers	0	0	1	1
FEU Lady Tamaraws	0	0	1	1

=== Men's division ===
==== Per year ====
Year	Champions	Runners-up	Third place	Ref.
2015	SM By The Bay (A)	Champion Infinity (B)	Cignal HD Spikers (A)	
2016	Philippine Navy (A)	Team Volleyball Manila	FEU Tamaraws (A)	
2017	Generika–Ayala Lifesavers	Cignal HD Spikers	SM By The Bay	
2018	Foton Tornadoes	Sands SM By The Bay	Smart Prepaid Giga Hitters	
2019	Cignal HD Spikers	Foton Tornadoes Blue Energy	Philippine Army Troopers	

==== Per franchise ====
The table lists all medals won by a single franchise and not by individual squad.

Franchise	Gold medal	Silver medal	Bronze medal	Total
Cignal HD Spikers	1	1	1	3
SM By The Bay	1	1	1	3
Foton Tornadoes	1	1	0	2
Generika–Ayala Lifesavers	1	0	0	1
Philippine Navy Fighting Stingrays	1	0	0	1
Team Volleyball Manila	0	2	0	2
FEU Tamaraws	0	0	1	1
Philippine Army Troopers	0	0	1	1
Smart Prepaid Giga Hitters	0	0	1	1
