= Cocolife Asset Managers =

- United VC crest and sponsored secondary logo (Note: Both are used with the second simultaneously devised by the team from 2017 to 2018.)
- Full name: United Volleyball Club (Cocolife Asset Managers)
- Short name: Cocolife
- Nickname: Asset Managers
- Founded: 2017
- Dissolved: 2019
- League: Philippine Super Liga

The Cocolife Asset Managers were a women's volleyball team in the Philippines. The team competed in the Philippine Super Liga (PSL) from 2017 to 2019. The team was first known as the United Volleyball Club, but for most of its history was under the sponsorship of United Coconut Planters Life Assurance Corporation (Cocolife). In 2019, financial struggles eventually led to the disbandment of the team.

== History ==
The United Volleyball Club joined the Philippine Super Liga in January 2017. It was named "United" due to having former players of rival University Athletic Association of the Philippines (UAAP) schools in Ateneo and La Salle in its roster.

However the team adopted the name Cocolife Asset Managers instead after securing sponsorship with the United Coconut Planters Life Assurance Corporation (COCOLIFE) in February 2017. The club adopted the company's colors blue and green which are also coincidentally the same as the two schools.

They played under the Cocolife name from the 2017 to 2018 seasons. Starting from the 2019 Grand Prix Conference they competed as United Volleyball Club, now without a naming sponsor. The team experienced financial issues with team manager Josh Ylaya serving as interim head coach due to Moro Branislav's departure to lessen operational expenses.

The club disbanded in June 2019 due to its inability to find a new sponsor.

== Name changes ==
- UVC–Cocolife Asset Managers (2017–2018)
- United Volleyball Club (2019)

== Honors ==
=== Team ===
Philippine Superliga:

| Season | Conference | Title | Source |
|---|---|---|---|
| 2017 | Invitational | 5th place | |
| 2017 | Beach Challenge Cup | 8th place | |
| 2017 | All-Filipino | 5th place | |
| 2017 | Grand Prix | 4th place | |
| 2018 | Grand Prix | 4th place | |
| 2018 | Beach Challenge Cup | Team A: 6th place | |
| 2018 | Beach Challenge Cup | Team B: | |
| 2018 | Beach Challenge Cup | Men's: | |
| 2018 | Invitational | 10th place | |
| 2018 | All-Filipino | 7th place | |
| 2019 | Grand Prix | 5th place | |
| 2019 | Beach Challenge Cup | Team A: | |
| 2019 | Beach Challenge Cup | Team B: | |
| 2019 | All-Filipino | | |
| 2019 | Invitational | | |

Others:

| Season | Tournament | Title | Source |
|---|---|---|---|
| 2017 | Vinh Long Open (Vietnam) | | |

=== Individual ===
| Season | Conference | Award | Name | Source |
|---|---|---|---|---|
| 2018 | Grand Prix | 1st Best Outside Spiker | Sara Klisura | |

== Team captains ==
- (Philippines) Michele Gumabao (2017)
- (Serbia) Sara Klisura (2018 Grand Prix)
- (Philippines) Aerieal Patnongon (2018 Invitationals)
- (Philippines) Marge Tejada (2018 All-Filipino)
- (Philippines) (United States) Kalei Mau (2019 Grand Prix)

== Coaches ==
- (Philippines) Roberto Javier (2017 Philippine Super Liga Invitational Cup)
- (Philippines) Emilio Reyes Jr. (2017)
- (Serbia) Moro Branislav (2018)
- (Philippines) Joshua Ylaya (2019) ^{(interim)}

== Imports ==
| Season | Number | Player | Country |
|---|---|---|---|
| 2017 | 2 | Taylor Milton | United States |
| 2017 | 18 | Tai Manu-Olevao | United States |
| 2018 | 2 | Taylor Milton | United States |
| 2018 | 1 | Sara Klisura | Serbia |
| 2018 | 18 | Marta Drpa | Serbia |
| 2019 | 5 | Yaasmeen Bedart-Ghani | United States |
| 2019 | 2 | Tai Manu-Olevao (withdrew) | United States |
| 2019 | 20 | Sutadta Chuewulim | Thailand |
