= 2016 Philippine Super Liga Beach Volleyball Challenge Cup =

Second edition of the Philippine Super Liga beach volleyball tournament

- Duration: May 7–29, 2016
- Teams: W: 13 (Note: Ten teams; thirteen separate squads) (Note: The Mapúa Lady Cardinals withdrew from the tournament.); M: 10 (Note: Eight teams; ten separate squads)
- TV partner(s): TV5, AksyonTV, Sports5.ph

Results
- Champions: W: RC Cola–Army Troopers (A); M: Philippine Navy Fighting Stingrays (A)
- Runners-up: W: Foton Toplanders; M: Team Volleyball Manila
- Third place: W: FEU–Petron; M: FEU Tamaraws (A)
- Fourth place: W: Petron XCS; M: Philippine Navy Fighting Stingrays (B)

PSL Beach Volleyball Challenge Cup chronology
- < 2015 2017 >

PSL conference chronology
- < 2016 Invitational 2016 All-Filipino >

The 2016 Philippine Super Liga Beach Volleyball Challenge Cup was the second running of the Philippine Super Liga Beach Volleyball Challenge Cup and the second tournament of the 2016 season. The conference ran from May 7 to 29, 2016 at The Sands, SM By The Bay (SM Mall of Asia).

== Women's division ==
2016 PSL Beach Volleyball Challenge Cup teams (Women's Division)
Abbr.	Team	Company	Colors	Players
AQP	Accel Quantum Plus	Sporteum Philippines		Aileen Abuel and Princess Listana
CIG	Cignal Team Awesome	Cignal TV, Inc.		Vhima Condada and Mary Grace Berte
F2L	F2 Logistics Cargo Movers	F2 Global Logistics, Inc.		Danika Gendrauli and Aby Maraño
FEU	FEU Lady Tamaraws-Petron	Far Eastern University / Petron Corporation		Bernadeth Pons and Kyla Atienza
FOT	Foton Toplanders	United Asia Automotive Group, Inc.		Cherry Rondina and Patty Orendain
MIT	Mapúa Lady Cardinals	Mapúa Institute of Technology		Shaira Hermano and Niella Ramillo
MER	MERALCO	Manila Electric Company		April Ross Hingpit and Jonafer San Pedro
PET-A	Petron Sprint 4T	Petron Corporation		Maica Morada and Frances Molina
PET-B	Petron XCS	Petron Corporation		Aiza Maizo-Pontillas and Shiela Marie Pineda
SN-A	Standard Insurance-Navy Corvettes (Team A)	Standard Insurance / Philippine Navy		Norie Jane Diaz and Ma. Paulina Soriano
SN-B	Standard Insurance-Navy Corvettes (Team B)	Standard Insurance / Philippine Navy		Florence Madulid and Pauline Genido
RCC-A	RC Cola-Army Troopers (Team A)	ARC Refreshments Corporation		Jovelyn Gonzaga and Nerissa Bautista
RCC-B	RC Cola-Army Troopers (Team B)	ARC Refreshments Corporation		Jeannie delos Reyes and Genie Sabas
UE	UE Lady Warriors	University of the East		Jasmine Alcayde and Angelica Dacaymat

=== Preliminary round ===
==== Pool A ====
Pos	Team	Pld	W	L	Pts	SW	SL	SR	SPW	SPL	SPR	Qualification
1	Standard Ins.-Navy “A” (SN-A)	2	2	0	6	4	0	MAX	87	59	1.475	Quarterfinals
2	RC Cola-Army “B” (RCC-B)	2	1	1	3	2	2	1.000	82	76	1.079	Quarterfinals
3	UE (UE)	1	0	1	0	0	4	0.000	50	84	0.595	

Date	Time		Score		Set 1	Set 2	Set 3	Total	Report
07 May	07:30	RCC-B	2–0	UE	21–18	21–13		42–31	
07 May	11:15	SN-A	2–0	RCC-B	21–18	24–22		45–40	
14 May	16:00	UE	0–2	SN-A	8–21	11–21		19–42	

==== Pool B ====
Pos	Team	Pld	W	L	Pts	SW	SL	SR	SPW	SPL	SPR	Qualification
1	F2 Logistics (F2L)	2	2	0	6	4	0	MAX	84	46	1.826	Quarterfinals
2	Petron Sprint 4T (PET-A)	2	1	1	3	2	2	1.000	68	73	0.932	Quarterfinals
3	Standard Ins.-Navy “B” (SN-B)	2	0	2	0	0	4	0.000	51	84	0.607	

Date	Time		Score		Set 1	Set 2	Set 3	Total	Report
07 May	08:15	PET-A	2–0	SN-B	21–17	21–14		42–31	
07 May	11:15	F2L	2–0	PET-A	21–10	21–16		42–26	
14 May	17:00	SN-B	0–2	F2L	13–21	7–21		20–42	

==== Pool C ====
Pos	Team	Pld	W	L	Pts	SW	SL	SR	SPW	SPL	SPR	Qualification
1	Foton (FOT)	2	2	0	6	4	0	MAX	126	27	4.667	Quarterfinals
2	Petron XCS (PET-B)	2	1	1	3	2	2	1.000	101	58	1.741	Quarterfinals
3	Accel Quantum Plus (AQP)	2	0	2	0	0	4	0.000	26	84	0.310	
4	Mapúa (MIT)	0	0	0	0	0	0	—	0	0	—	Withdrew

Date	Time		Score		Set 1	Set 2	Set 3	Total	Report
07 May	09:00	FOT	2–0	AQP	21–3	21–7		42–10	
07 May	10:30	PET-B (w/o)	2–0	MIT	21–0	21–0		42–0	
07 May	17:00	FOT (w/o)	2–0	MIT	21–0	21–0		42–0	
07 May	18:00	AQP	0–0	PET-B	7–21	9–21		16–42	
14 May	15:00	FOT	2–0	PET-B	21–9	21–8		42–17	

w/o = Walkover (MIT withdrew from the tournament)

==== Pool D ====
Pos	Team	Pld	W	L	Pts	SW	SL	SR	SPW	SPL	SPR	Qualification
1	RC Cola-Army “A” (RCC-A)	3	3	0	9	6	1	6.000	139	112	1.241	Quarterfinals
2	FEU-Petron (FEU)	3	2	1	6	5	2	2.500	132	110	1.200	Quarterfinals
3	MERALCO (MER)	3	1	2	3	2	5	0.400	108	134	0.806	
4	Cignal (CIG)	3	0	3	0	1	6	0.167	108	133	0.812	

Date	Time		Score		Set 1	Set 2	Set 3	Total	Report
07 May	09:45	MER	0–2	FEU	14–21	12–21		26–42	
07 May	13:00	MER	2–1	CIG	13–21	21–18	15–11	49–50	
07 May	17:00	FEU	1–2	RCC-A	19–21	16–21	13–15	48–57	
07 May	19:00	RCC-A	2–0	CIG	21–15	21–14		42–29	
14 May	18:00	MER	0–2	RCC-A	17–21	16–21		33–42	
14 May	19:00	CIG	0–2	FEU	14–21	15–21		29–42	

=== Playoffs ===
Quarter-finals
B1	F2 Logistics (F2L)	17	16
C2	Petron XCS (PET-B)	21	21
D1	RC Cola-Army "A" (RCC-A)	21	21
B2	Petron Sprint 4T (PET-A)	14	12
A1	Standard Ins.-Navy "A" (SN-A)	21	20	10
D2	FEU-Petron (FEU)	13	22	15
C1	Foton Toplanders (FOT)	21	21
A2	RC Cola-Army "B" (RCC-B)	8	14

Semi-finals
C2	Petron XCS (PET-B)	0	0	0
D1	RC Cola-Army "A" (RCC-A)	0	0	0
D2	FEU-Petron (FEU)	0	0	0
C1	Foton Toplanders (FOT)	0	0	0

Final
D1	RC Cola-Army "A" (RCC-A)	0	0	0
C1	Foton Toplanders (FOT)	0	0	0
Bronze-medal match
C2	Petron XCS (PET-B)	0	0	0
D2	FEU-Petron (FEU)	0	0	0

==== Quarterfinals ====
Date	Time		Score		Set 1	Set 2	Set 3	Total	Report
22 May	15:30	F2L	0–2	PET-B	17–21	16–21		33–42	
22 May	16:30	RCC-A	2–0	PET-A	21–14	21–12		42–26	
22 May	17:30	SN-A	1–2	FEU	21–13	20–22	10–15	51–50	
22 May	18:30	FOT	2–0	RCC-B	21–8	21–14		42–22	

Date	Time		Score		Set 1	Set 2	Set 3	Total	Report
29 May	07:30	F2L	0–0	PET-A	0–0	0–0		0–0	
29 May	08:15	SN-A	0–0	RCC-B	0–0	0–0		0–0	

==== For 7th place ====
Date	Time	Score	Set 1	Set 2	Set 3	Total	Report
29 May	10:30	0–0	0–0	0–0		0–0	

==== For 5th place ====
Date	Time	Score	Set 1	Set 2	Set 3	Total	Report
29 May	13:15	0–0	0–0	0–0		0–0	

==== Semi-finals ====
Date	Time		Score		Set 1	Set 2	Set 3	Total	Report
29 May	11:15	PET-B	0–0	RCC-A	0–0	0–0		0–0	
29 May	12:15	FEU	0–0	FOT	0–0	0–0		0–0	

==== For 3rd place ====
Date	Time		Score		Set 1	Set 2	Set 3	Total	Report
29 May	16:15	PET-A	0–2	FEU	12–21	13–21		0–0	Report

==== Women's Finals ====
Date	Time		Score		Set 1	Set 2	Set 3	Total	Report
29 May	17:30	RCC-A	2–1	FOT	21–18	18–21	15-13	0–0	Report

=== Final standing ===
Rank	Team
1st place, gold medalist(s)	RC Cola-Army Troopers (Team A)
2nd place, silver medalist(s)	Foton Toplanders
3rd place, bronze medalist(s)	FEU-Petron
4	Petron XCS
5	F2 Logistics Cargo Movers
6	Standard Insurance-Navy (Team A)
7	RC Cola-Army Troopers (Team B)
8	Petron Sprint 4T
9	
10	
11	
12	
13	

2016 Philippine Super Liga Beach Challenge Cup
RC Cola-Army Troopers (Team A)
1st title
Team Roster
Jovelyn Gonzaga and Nerissa Bautista

== Men's division ==
2016 PSL Beach Volleyball Challenge Cup teams (Men's Division)
Abbr.	Team	Company	Colors	Players
CIG	Cignal Team Awesome	Cignal TV, Inc.		Rey Taneo and Relan Taneo
IEM	IEM Volley Masters	Instituto Estetico Manila		Arjay Salcedo and Bobby Gatdula
FEU-A	FEU Tamaraws (Team A)	Far Eastern University		Joel Cayaban and Franco Camcam
FEU-B	FEU Tamaraws (Team B)	Far Eastern University		Rikko Mamerto and Greg Dolor
PN-A	Philippine Navy (Team A)	Philippine Navy		Nur-amin Madsairi and Roldan Medino
PN-B	Philippine Navy (Team B)	Philippine Navy		Pajiji Alsali and Milover Parcon
SM	SM By The Bay	SM Prime Holdings		Daniel Young and Tim Young
TVM	Team Volleyball Manila	Team Volleyball Manila		Kris Roy Guzman and Anthony Lemuel Arbasto
UE	UE Red Warriors	University of the East		Geric Rodmar Ortega and Ruvince Abrot
WAY	Wayuk			Philip Bagalay and Paul John Cuzon

=== Preliminary round ===
==== Pool A ====
Pos	Team	Pld	W	L	Pts	SW	SL	SR	SPW	SPL	SPR	Qualification
1	Philippine Navy "B" (PN-B)	4	4	0	12	8	0	MAX	168	109	1.541	Semifinals
2	FEU "A" (FEU-A)	4	3	1	9	6	3	2.000	152	150	1.013	Semifinals
3	Wayuk (WAY)	4	2	2	6	4	4	1.000	148	141	1.050	
4	IEM Volley Masters (IEM)	4	1	3	3	2	6	0.333	131	165	0.794	
5	UE (UE)	4	0	4	0	1	6	0.167	143	177	0.808	

Date	Time		Score		Set 1	Set 2	Set 3	Total	Report
14 May	08:00	WAY	0–2	FEU-A	18–21	16–21		34–42	
14 May	08:45	UE	0–2	IEM	19–21	20–22		39–43	
14 May	10:15	WAY	0–2	PN-B	17–21	13–21		30–42	
14 May	11:00	FEU-A	2–1	UE	21–14	14–21	15–12	50–47	
14 May	13:15	PN-B	2–0	IEM	21–15	21–15		42–30	
22 May	08:00	PN-B	2–0	UE	21–13	21–18		42–31	
22 May	10:15	FEU-A	2–0	IEM	21–17	21–10		42–27	
22 May	11:45	WAY	2–0	UE	21–12	21–14		42–26	
22 May	12:15	PN-B	2–0	FEU-A	21–8	21–10		42–18	
22 May	20:15	WAY	2–0	IEM	21–18	21–13		42–31	

==== Pool B ====
Pos	Team	Pld	W	L	Pts	SW	SL	SR	SPW	SPL	SPR	Qualification
1	Philippine Navy "A" (PN-A)	4	4	0	12	8	3	2.667	199	167	1.192	Semifinals
2	Team Volleyball Manila (TVM)	4	3	1	9	7	3	2.333	198	167	1.186	Semifinals
3	Cignal (CIG)	4	2	2	6	6	4	1.500	182	165	1.103	
4	FEU "B" (FEU-B)	4	1	3	3	3	6	0.500	144	160	0.900	
5	SM By The Bay (SM)	4	0	4	0	0	8	0.000	106	170	0.624	

Date	Time		Score		Set 1	Set 2	Set 3	Total	Report
14 May	09:30	FEU-B	0–2	CIG	16–21	12–21		28–42	
14 May	11:45	PN-A	2–1	CIG	23–21	15–21	15–10	53–52	
14 May	12:30	TVM	2–0	FEU-B	21–16	21–15		42–31	
14 May	19:45	CIG	2–0	SM	21–12	21–14		42–26	
14 May	20:30	PN-A	2–1	FEU-B	21–14	13–21	15–8	49–43	
22 May	08:45	FEU-B	2–0	SM	21–9	21–18		42–27	
22 May	09:30	CIG	1–2	TVM	24–22	14–21	8–15	46–58	
22 May	11:00	PN-A	2–0	SM	21–9	21–9		42–18	
22 May	13:00	PN-A	2–1	TVM	16–21	21–17	18–16	55–54	
22 May	19:30	SM	0–2	TVM	12–21	23–23		35–44	

=== Playoffs ===
Semifinals
29 May
Philippine Navy "B" (PN-B)	0
Team Volleyball Manila (TVM)	0
29 May
Philippine Navy "A" (PN-A)	0
FEU "A" (FEU-A)	0

Final
29 May
Philippine Navy "A" (PN-A)	0
Team Volleyball Manila (TVM)	0
3rd-place match
29 May
Philippine Navy "B" (PN-B)	0
FEU "A" (FEU-A)	0

==== Semi-finals ====
Date	Time		Score		Set 1	Set 2	Set 3	Total	Report
29 May	09:00	PN-B	0–0	TVM	0–0	0–0	0–0	0–0	
29 May	09:45	PN-A	0–0	FEU-A	0–0	0–0	0–0	0–0	

==== For 3rd place ====
Date	Time	Score	Set 1	Set 2	Set 3	Total	Report
29 May	14:15	0–0	0–0	0–0	0–0	0–0	

==== Men's Finals ====
Date	Time		Score		Set 1	Set 2	Set 3	Total	Report
29 May	15:15	PN-A	2–1	TVM	21–13	11–21	18–16	0–0	Report

=== Final standing ===
Rank	Team
1st place, gold medalist(s)	Philippine Navy (Team A)
2nd place, silver medalist(s)	Team Volleyball Manila
3rd place, bronze medalist(s)	FEU (Team A)
4	Philippine Navy (Team B)
5	FEU (Team B)
6	
7	
8	
9	
10	

2016 Philippine Super Liga Beach Challenge Cup
Philippine Navy (Team A)
1st title
Team Roster
Nur-amin Madsairi and Roldan Medino

== Venue ==
- The Sands (SM By The Bay, SM Mall of Asia)

== Broadcast partners ==
- TV5, AksyonTV, Sports5.ph
