= 2018 Philippine Super Liga Invitational Cup =

Second indoor conference of the 2018 Philippine Super Liga season

- Duration: June 23 – July 28, 2018
- Teams: 10
- TV partner(s): ESPN 5, AksyonTV, Hyper, ESPN5.com

Results
- Champions: F2 Logistics Cargo Movers
- Runners-up: Petron Blaze Spikers
- Third place: Cignal HD Spikers
- Fourth place: Smart–Army Giga Hitters

Awards
- MVP: Ara Galang
- Best OH: Rachel Daquis; Sisi Rondina
- Best MB: Mika Reyes; Majoy Baron
- Best OPP: Aiza Maizo-Pontillas
- Best Setter: Kim Fajardo
- Best Libero: Dawn Macandili

PSL Invitational Cup chronology
- < 2017 2019 >

PSL conference chronology
- < 2018 Grand Prix 2018 All-Filipino >
- < 2018 BVCC

The 2018 Philippine Super Liga Invitational Cup (also known as the 2018 Chooks-to-Go Philippine Super Liga Invitational Cup due to sponsorship reasons) was the second conference of the 2018 season of the Philippine Super Liga (PSL) and the fourth running of the Invitational Cup. The tournament ran from June 23 to July 28, 2018. As with the 2017 Invitational, the tournament used an all-to-play format to give playing time for every player in each team.

Alongside the eight member teams, two new squads join the fold in this conference. Those teams were the UP Lady Fighting Maroons and the returning Cherrylume Iron Lady Warriors.

The F2 Logistics Cargo Movers and Petron Blaze Spikers contested the championship for the fourth conference in a row. It was F2 Logistics who defeated their rivals to win their third championship.

== Teams ==
2018 Philippine Super Liga Invitational Cup
Abbr.	Team	Affiliation	Head coach	Team captain
Member teams
CIG	Cignal HD Spikers	Cignal TV, Inc.	(Philippines) Edgar Barroga	Rachel Daquis
CCL	Cocolife Asset Managers	United Coconut Planters Life Assurance Corporation	(Serbia) Moro Branislav	Aerieal Patnogon
FTL	F2 Logistics Cargo Movers	F2 Global Logistics Inc.	(Philippines) Ramil de Jesus	Cha Cruz-Behag
FOT	Foton Tornadoes Blue Energy	United Asia Automotive Group, Inc.	(Philippines) Edjet Mabbayad	Maika Ortiz
GAL	Generika–Ayala Lifesavers	Actimed, Inc.	(Philippines) Sherwin Meneses	Angeli Pauline Araneta
PET	Petron Blaze Spikers	Petron Corporation	(Philippines) Shaq delos Santos	Frances Molina
SMA	Smart−Army Giga Hitters	Smart Communications	(Philippines) Kungfu Reyes	Ging Balse
SLR	Sta. Lucia Lady Realtors	Sta. Lucia Realty and Development Corporation	(Philippines) George Pascua	Pamela Lastimosa
Collegiate teams
CHE	Cherrylume Iron Lady Warriors	University of the East / Mileage Asia Corporation	(Philippines) Rodrigo Roque	Lhara May Clavano
UPU	UP–United Auctioneers Lady Fighting Maroons	University of the Philippines Diliman / United Auctioneers, Inc.	(Kenya) Godfrey Okumu	Ma. Arielle Estrañero

== Format ==
Preliminary round

- In the preliminary round, teams were split into two groups.
- The preliminary round was a single round-robin tournament, with each team playing one match against all other teams in their pool for a total of four matches.
- The top team in each pool earned a bye to the semifinals while teams ranked second and third started in the quarterfinals. The fourth-place teams would play in the seventh-place match while the fifth-place teams would play in the ninth-place match.

Quarterfinals

- The quarterfinals featured single-elimination matches.
- The match-ups were as follows:
  - QF1: A2 vs. B3
  - QF2: B2 vs. A3
- The winners advanced to the semifinals while the losers would play in the fifth-place match.

Classification matches

- The fifth-place, seventh-place, and ninth-place matches were all single-elimination.
- The match-ups were as follows:
  - Fifth-place match: Quarterfinal round losers
  - Seventh-place match: A4 vs. B4
  - Ninth-place match: A5 vs. B5

Semifinals

- The semifinals also featured single-elimination matches.
- The match-ups were as follows:
  - SF1: A1 vs. QF2 winner
  - SF2: A2 vs. QF1 winner
- The winners advanced to the championship match while the losers would play in the third-place match.

Finals

- The championship was a best-of-three series while the third-place match was single-elimination.
- The match-ups were as follows:
  - Championship match: Semifinal round winners
  - Third-place match: Semifinal round losers

== Preliminary round ==
=== Group A ===
Pos	Team	Pld	W	L	Pts	SW	SL	SR	SPW	SPL	SPR	Qualification
1	Petron Blaze Spikers	4	3	1	10	11	5	2.200	385	328	1.174	Semifinals
2	F2 Logistics Cargo Movers	4	3	1	9	10	3	3.333	310	260	1.192	Quarterfinals
3	Generika–Ayala Lifesavers	4	3	1	7	9	8	1.125	375	360	1.042	Quarterfinals
4	Foton Tornadoes Blue Energy	4	1	3	4	6	10	0.600	338	356	0.949	Seventh place match
5	UP–United Auctioneers Lady Fighting Maroons	4	0	4	0	2	12	0.167	242	346	0.699	Ninth place match

Date	Time		Score		Set 1	Set 2	Set 3	Set 4	Set 5	Total	Report
23 Jun	17:00	Generika–Ayala Lifesavers	3–1	UP–United Auctioneers Lady Fighting Maroons	25–23	25–9	23–25	25–16		98–73	
23 Jun	19:00	F2 Logistics Cargo Movers	3–0	Foton Tornadoes Blue Energy	25–21	25–21	25–14			75–56	
26 Jun	16:15	Generika–Ayala Lifesavers	3–2	Foton Tornadoes Blue Energy	25–23	20–25	21–25	25–12	15–13	106–98	
03 Jul	19:00	Petron Blaze Spikers	3–1	Foton Tornadoes Blue Energy	27–25	25–19	22–25	25–17		99–86	
05 Jul	16:15	Generika–Ayala Lifesavers	0–3	F2 Logistics Cargo Movers	20–25	16–25	20–25			56–75	
07 Jul	16:00	Petron Blaze Spikers	3–0	UP–United Auctioneers Lady Fighting Maroons	25–9	25–16	25–17			75–42	
10 Jul	16:15	Foton Tornadoes Blue Energy	3–1	UP–United Auctioneers Lady Fighting Maroons	25–10	23–25	25–22	25–19		98–76	
12 Jul	16:15	Generika–Ayala Lifesavers	3–2	Petron Blaze Spikers	25–23	19–25	25–22	31–33	15–11	115–114	
12 Jul	19:00	UP–United Auctioneers Lady Fighting Maroons	0–3	F2 Logistics Cargo Movers	13–25	22–25	16–25			51–75	
14 Jul	18:00	Petron Blaze Spikers	3–1	F2 Logistics Cargo Movers	25–16	21–25	25–20	26–24		97–85	

=== Group B ===
Pos	Team	Pld	W	L	Pts	SW	SL	SR	SPW	SPL	SPR	Qualification
1	Cignal HD Spikers	4	4	0	11	12	3	4.000	355	311	1.141	Semifinals
2	Smart-Army Giga Hitters	4	3	1	9	9	4	2.250	301	255	1.180	Quarterfinals
3	Sta. Lucia Lady Realtors	4	2	2	7	8	7	1.143	328	334	0.982	Quarterfinals
4	Cocolife Asset Managers	4	1	3	3	5	10	0.500	335	349	0.960	Seventh place match
5	Cherrylume Iron Lady Warriors	4	0	4	0	2	12	0.167	272	342	0.795	Ninth place match

Date	Time		Score		Set 1	Set 2	Set 3	Set 4	Set 5	Total	Report
25 Jun	16:15	Cocolife Asset Managers	3–1	Cherrylume Iron Lady Warriors	22–25	25–13	25–22	25–18		97–78	
25 Jun	19:00	Smart–Army Giga Hitters	3–0	Sta. Lucia Lady Realtors	25–14	25–16	25–23			75–53	
26 Jun	19:00	Cignal HD Spikers	3–1	Cherrylume Iron Lady Warriors	19–25	26–24	25–21	25–22		95–92	Report
28 Jun	16:15	Cignal HD Spikers	3–0	Smart–Army Giga Hitters	25–10	26–24	25–18			76–52	
28 Jun	19:00	Sta. Lucia Lady Realtors	3–1	Cocolife Asset Managers	25–20	25–22	22–25	25-19		97–67	
03 Jul	16:15	Cignal HD Spikers	3–2	Sta. Lucia Lady Realtors	25–18	26–28	25–23	18–25	15–9	109–103	
05 Jul	18:00	Smart–Army Giga Hitters	3–1	Cocolife Asset Managers	25–21	26–24	23–25	25-18		99–70	
07 Jul	18:00	Cherrylume Iron Lady Warriors	0–3	Sta. Lucia Lady Realtors	21–25	20–25	23–25			64–75	
10 Jul	19:00	Smart–Army Giga Hitters	3–0	Cherrylume Iron Lady Warriors	25–10	25–15	25–13			75–38	
14 Jul	16:00	Cignal HD Spikers	3–0	Cocolife Asset Managers	25–21	25–21	25–21			75–63	

== Playoffs ==
Quarterfinals
A3	GEN	0
B2	SMA	3
A2	FTL	3
B3	SLR	1

Semifinals
A1	PET	3
B2	SMA	0
B1	CIG	0
A2	FTL	3

Finals
A1	PET	2
A2	FTL	3

=== Quarterfinals ===
Date	Time		Score		Set 1	Set 2	Set 3	Set 4	Set 5	Total	Report
17 Jul	14:00	Foton Tornadoes Blue Energy	3–0	Cherrylume Iron Lady Warriors	25–0	25–0	25–0			75–0	
17 Jul	16:15	UP–United Auctioneers Lady Fighting Maroons	3–1	Cocolife Asset Managers	23–25	25–20	25–16	25–13		98–74	
17 Jul	19:00	F2 Logistics Cargo Movers	3–1	Sta. Lucia Lady Realtors	25–16	20–25	25–17	25–16		95–74	
19 Jul	19:00	Generika–Ayala Lifesavers	0–3	Smart–Army Giga Hitters	19–25	22–25	21–25			62–75	

=== 9th place ===
Date	Time		Score		Set 1	Set 2	Set 3	Set 4	Set 5	Total	Report
19 Jul	14:00	Cherrylume Iron Lady Warriors	3–2	Cocolife Asset Managers	22–25	26–24	25–19	21–25	22–20	116–113	

=== 7th place ===
Date	Time		Score		Set 1	Set 2	Set 3	Set 4	Set 5	Total	Report
19 Jul	16:15	Foton Tornadoes Blue Energy	3–0	UP–United Auctioneers Lady Fighting Maroons	25–14	25–14	25–14			75–42	

=== 5th place ===
Date	Time		Score		Set 1	Set 2	Set 3	Set 4	Set 5	Total	Report
21 Jul	14:00	Sta. Lucia Lady Realtors	1–3	Generika–Ayala Lifesavers	10–25	26–24	10–25	18–25		64–99	

=== Semifinals ===
Date	Time		Score		Set 1	Set 2	Set 3	Set 4	Set 5	Total	Report
21 Jul	16:00	Petron Blaze Spikers	3–0	Smart–Army Giga Hitters	25–12	25–15	25–17			75–44	
21 Jul	18:00	Cignal HD Spikers	0–3	F2 Logistics Cargo Movers	22–25	15–25	19–25			56–75	

=== Bronze match ===
Date	Time		Score		Set 1	Set 2	Set 3	Set 4	Set 5	Total	Report
26 Jul	16:15	Smart–Army Giga Hitters	1–3	Cignal HD Spikers	15–25	25–22	20–25	18–25		78–97	

=== Finals ===
Date	Time		Score		Set 1	Set 2	Set 3	Set 4	Set 5	Total	Report
26 Jul	19:00	Petron Blaze Spikers	2–3	F2 Logistics Cargo Movers	25–18	23–25	25–20	27–29	14–16	114–108	
28 Jul	17:00	F2 Logistics Cargo Movers	3–1	Petron Blaze Spikers	25–18	23–25	25–23	25–18		98–84	

== Final standing ==
Rank	Team
1st place, gold medalist(s)	F2 Logistics Cargo Movers
2nd place, silver medalist(s)	Petron Blaze Spikers
3rd place, bronze medalist(s)	Cignal HD Spikers
4	Smart–Army Giga Hitters
5	Generika–Ayala Lifesavers
6	Sta. Lucia Lady Realtors
7	Foton Tornadoes Blue Energy
8	UP - United Auctioneers Inc. Lady Maroons
9	UE - Cherrylume Iron Lady Warriors
10	Cocolife Asset Managers

2018 PSL Grand Prix Champions
F2 Logistics Cargo Movers
Team roster
Charleen Abiegail Cruz-Behag (c). Dawn Macandili (libero), Abigail Maraño, Norielle Ipac, Victonara Galang, Ernestine Tiamzon, Kim Fajardo, Mary Joy Baron, Aduke Christine Ogunsanya, Kim Kianna Dy, Michelle Cobb, Michelle Katherine Morente, Desiree Cheng, Fritz Joy Gallenero (libero), Ramil de Jesus (head coach)

== Individual awards ==
Award		Name/Team
MVP		(Philippines) Victonara Galang (F2 Logistics)
Best Outside Spiker	1st:	(Philippines) Rachel Daquis (Cignal)
Best Outside Spiker	2nd:	(Philippines) Cherry Ann Rondina (Petron)
Best Middle Blocker	1st:	(Philippines) Mika Aereen Reyes (Petron)
Best Middle Blocker	2nd:	(Philippines) Mary Joy Baron (F2 Logistics)
Best Opposite Spiker		(Philippines) Aiza Maizo-Pontillas (Petron)
Best Setter		(Philippines) Kim Fajardo (F2 Logistics)
Best Libero		(Philippines) Dawn Macandili (F2 Logistics)
Best Scorer		(Philippines) Patty Jane Orendain (Generika-Ayala)

== Tune-up games with the Philippine national team ==
The Philippines women's national volleyball team that will participate in the 2018 Asian Games in Indonesia on August 18–September 2, 2018 will be a guest team in the tournament. The team will play tune up games against some of the regular PSL teams. National players will play for their respective mother teams in games pitting the Philippine team against their mother team. Alyssa Valdez and Jia Morado will not play for the national team in the PSL tune up games due to obligations with their mother team, the Creamline Cool Smashers in the ongoing 2018 Premier Volleyball League Reinforced Conference.

Date	Time		Score		Set 1	Set 2	Set 3	Set 4	Set 5	Total	Report
06 Jul	14:00	Philippines women's national team	3–0	Cocolife Asset Managers	25–13	25–17	25–11			75–41	P–2
10 Jul	14:00	Philippines women's national team	3–0	Cignal HD Spikers	25–21	25–15	25–21			75–57	
12 Jul	14:00	Philippines women's national team	3–0	Smart–Army Giga Hitters	25–16	25–17	25–17			75–50	P–2

== Venues ==
- Smart Araneta Coliseum (opening day)
- Filoil Flying V Arena (main venue)
- Cuneta Astrodome (secondary venue)

"Spike on Tour" Venues:

- Cadiz Arena (July 3)
- Muntinlupa Sports Complex (July 14, 21)

== Broadcast partners ==
- ESPN 5: The 5 Network, AksyonTV, Hyper (SD and HD), ESPN5.com
