= 2018 Philippine Super Liga All-Filipino Conference =

Third indoor conference of the 2018 Philippine Super Liga season

- Duration: October 30 – December 20, 2018
- Teams: 8
- TV partner(s): ESPN 5, AksyonTV, Hyper, ESPN5.com

Results
- Champions: Petron Blaze Spikers
- Runners-up: F2 Logistics Cargo Movers
- Third place: Generika–Ayala Lifesavers
- Fourth place: Cignal HD Spikers

Awards
- MVP: Rhea Dimaculangan
- Best OH: Rachel Daquis; Patty Jane Orendain
- Best MB: Ria Meneses; Majoy Baron
- Best OPP: Aiza Maizo-Pontillas
- Best Setter: Kim Fajardo
- Best Libero: Kath Arado

PSL All-Filipino Conference chronology
- < 2017 2019 >

PSL conference chronology
- < 2018 Invitational 2019 Grand Prix >
- 2018 Collegiate >

The 2018 Philippine Super Liga All-Filipino Conference (also known as the 2018 Chooks-to-Go Philippine Super Liga All-Filipino Conference due to sponsorship reasons) was the third conference of the 2018 season of the Philippine Super Liga (PSL) and the fifth running of the All-Filipino Conference. The tournament ran from October 30 to December 20, 2018.

The F2 Logistics Cargo Movers and Petron Blaze Spikers continued their rivalry with a fifth consecutive championship contest, with Petron winning this tournament to claim their fifth league title.

This conference ran simultaneously with the 2018 Collegiate Grand Slam.

== Teams ==
2018 Philippine Super Liga All-Filipino Conference
Abbr.	Team	Affiliation	Head coach	Team captain
CHD	Cignal HD Spikers	Cignal TV, Inc.	(Philippines) Edgar Barroga	Rachel Daquis
CCL	Cocolife Asset Managers	United Coconut Planters Life Assurance Corporation	(Serbia) Moro Branislav	Margarita Anna Marie Tejada
FTL	F2 Logistics Cargo Movers	F2 Global Logistics Inc.	(Philippines) Ramil de Jesus	Cha Cruz-Behag
FOT	Foton Tornadoes Blue Energy	United Asia Automotive Group, Inc.	(Philippines) Aaron Velez	Maika Ortiz
GAL	Generika–Ayala Lifesavers	Actimed, Inc.	(Philippines) Sherwin Meneses	Angeli Pauline Araneta
PET	Petron Blaze Spikers	Petron Corporation	(Philippines) Shaq delos Santos	Frances Molina
SLR	Sta. Lucia Lady Realtors	Sta. Lucia Realty and Development Corporation	(Philippines) George Pascua	Pamela Lastimosa
SMA	Smart Giga Hitters	Smart Communications	(Philippines) Roger Gorayeb	Aiko Sweet Urdas

== Format ==
First round

- The preliminary round was split into two rounds.
- The first round was a single round-robin tournament, with each team playing one match against all other teams in their pool for a total of seven matches.

Second round

- In the second round, teams were divided into two groups based on results from the first round. The top three teams from one pool were grouped with the bottom three teams from the other pool.
- Results from the first round were carried over, and teams played in another single round-robin, playing one match against all other teams in their poll for an additional three matches. By the end of the second round, all teams will have played a total of ten matches.

Quarterfinals

- The quarterfinals featured single-elimination matches.
- The match-ups were as follows:
  - QF1: #1 vs. #8
  - QF2: #2 vs. #7
  - QF3: #3 vs. #6
  - QF4: #4 vs. #5
- The winners advanced to the semifinals while the losers were eliminated.

Semifinals

- The semifinals featured the twice-to-beat advantage, where the higher-seeded team in a match-up only needs to win one out of two matches. The lower-seeded team must win two matches back-to-back to advance.
- The match-ups were as follows:
  - SF1: QF1 vs. QF4 winner
  - SF2: QF2 vs. QF3 winner
- The winners advanced to the championship while the losers would play in the third-place match.

Finals

- The championship was a best-of-three series while the third-place match was single-elimination.
- The match-ups were as follows:
  - Championship: Semifinal round winners
  - Third-place match: Semifinal round losers

== Preliminary round ==
Pos	Team	Pld	W	L	Pts	SW	SL	SR	SPW	SPL	SPR
1	Petron Blaze Spikers	7	7	0	21	21	2	10.500	572	387	1.478
2	F2 Logistics Cargo Movers	7	5	2	15	17	6	2.833	541	431	1.255
3	Foton Tornadoes Blue Energy	7	5	2	14	16	11	1.455	576	569	1.012
4	Generika–Ayala Lifesavers	7	4	3	14	16	11	1.455	597	543	1.099
5	Cignal HD Spikers	7	4	3	10	13	13	1.000	559	553	1.011
6	Smart Giga Hitters	7	2	5	5	6	17	0.353	450	535	0.841
7	Cocolife Asset Managers	7	1	6	4	9	20	0.450	563	650	0.866
8	Sta. Lucia Lady Realtors	7	0	7	1	3	21	0.143	388	578	0.671

Rules for classification: 3 points = win match in 3 or 4 sets; 2 points = win match in 5 sets; 1 point = lose match in 5 sets; 0 point = lose match in 3 or 4 sets

Match results

- All times are in Philippines Standard Time (UTC+08:00)

Date	Time		Score		Set 1	Set 2	Set 3	Set 4	Set 5	Total	Report
30 Oct	14:00	Smart Giga Hitters	3–0	Sta. Lucia Lady Realtors	25–20	25–19	25–23	–	–	75–62	P–2
30 Oct	16:15	Petron Blaze Spikers	3–0	Cocolife Asset Managers	25–18	25–15	25–18	–	–	75–51	P–2
30 Oct	19:00	F2 Logistics Cargo Movers	3–0	Cignal HD Spikers	25–16	25–19	25–19	–	–	75–54	P–2
03 Nov	17:00	Foton Tornadoes Blue Energy	3–2	Generika–Ayala Lifesavers	20–25	25–21	25–14	19–25	15–5	104–90	P–2
03 Nov	19:00	Cignal HD Spikers	3–2	Cocolife Asset Managers	20–25	25–13	25–14	24–26	17–15	111–93	P–2
06 Nov	14:00	Foton Tornadoes Blue Energy	3–1	Cignal HD Spikers	25–15	18–25	25–22	25–20	–	93–82	P–2
06 Nov	16:15	F2 Logistics Cargo Movers	3–0	Sta. Lucia Lady Realtors	25–19	25–20	25–16	–	–	75–55	P–2
06 Nov	19:00	Petron Blaze Spikers	3–0	Generika–Ayala Lifesavers	25–18	25–22	25–13	–	–	75–53	P–2
08 Nov	14:00	F2 Logistics Cargo Movers	3–0	Cocolife Asset Managers	25–13	25–16	25–8	–	–	75–37	P–2
08 Nov	16:15	Sta. Lucia Lady Realtors	1–3	Foton Tornadoes Blue Energy	14–25	21–25	25–19	13–25	–	73–94	P–2
08 Nov	19:00	Petron Blaze Spikers	3–0	Smart Giga Hitters	25–23	25–14	25–18	–	–	75–55	P–2
10 Nov	16:00	Generika–Ayala Lifesavers	2–3	Cignal HD Spikers	24–26	25–17	22–25	25–20	15–17	111–105	
10 Nov	18:00	Petron Blaze Spikers	3–1	F2 Logistics Cargo Movers	22–25	25–16	25–16	25–20	–	97–77	
13 Nov	14:00	F2 Logistics Cargo Movers	1–3	Generika–Ayala Lifesavers	25–19	22–25	16–25	26–28	–	89–97	
13 Nov	16:15	Foton Tornadoes Blue Energy	3–0	Smart Giga Hitters	26–24	25–15	25–19	–	–	76–58	
13 Nov	19:00	Sta. Lucia Lady Realtors	0–3	Cignal HD Spikers	17–25	11–25	18–25	–	–	46–75	
15 Nov	14:00	Smart Giga Hitters	3–2	Cocolife Asset Managers	25–16	18–25	25–20	23–25	15–11	106–97	
15 Nov	16:15	Generika–Ayala Lifesavers	3–0	Sta. Lucia Lady Realtors	25–7	25–11	25–21	–	–	75–39	
15 Nov	19:00	Foton Tornadoes Blue Energy	0–3	F2 Logistics Cargo Movers	15–25	13–25	13–25	–	–	41–75	
17 Nov	14:00	Smart Giga Hitters	0–3	Generika–Ayala Lifesavers	19–25	12–25	15–25	–	–	46–75	
17 Nov	16:00	Cignal HD Spikers	0–3	Petron Blaze Spikers	22–25	16–25	19–25	–	–	57–75	
17 Nov	18:00	Cocolife Asset Managers	3–2	Sta. Lucia Lady Realtors	21–25	23–25	25–18	25–10	15–8	109–86	
20 Nov	14:00	Cocolife Asset Managers	1–3	Foton Tornadoes Blue Energy	23–25	28–26	21–25	19–25	–	91–101	
20 Nov	16:15	Sta. Lucia Lady Realtors	0–3	Petron Blaze Spikers	9–25	12–25	6–25	–	–	27–75	
20 Nov	19:00	Cignal HD Spikers	3–0	Smart Giga Hitters	25–20	25–20	25–20	–	–	75–60	
22 Nov	14:00	Cocolife Asset Managers	1–3	Generika–Ayala Lifesavers	24–26	25–20	17–25	19–25	–	85–96	
22 Nov	16:15	Smart Giga Hitters	0–3	F2 Logistics Cargo Movers	11–25	22–25	17–25	–	–	50–75	
22 Nov	19:00	Foton Tornadoes Blue Energy	1–3	Petron Blaze Spikers	14–25	27–25	14–25	12–25	–	67–100	

== Second round ==
=== Group A ===
Pos	Team	Pld	W	L	Pts	SW	SL	SR	SPW	SPL	SPR
1	Petron Blaze Spikers	10	10	0	30	30	3	10.000	819	551	1.486
2	Foton Tornadoes Blue Energy	10	6	4	17	20	18	1.111	791	825	0.959
3	Smart Giga Hitters	10	4	6	11	12	20	0.600	648	729	0.889
4	Sta. Lucia Lady Realtors	10	0	10	1	4	30	0.133	595	828	0.719

Date	Time		Score		Set 1	Set 2	Set 3	Set 4	Set 5	Total	Report
24 Nov	16:00	Petron Blaze Spikers	3–0	Sta. Lucia Lady Realtors	25–18	27–25	25–17	–	–	77–60	
27 Nov	14:00	Smart Giga Hitters	3–0	Sta. Lucia Lady Realtors	25–23	25–19	25–19	–	–	75–61	
27 Nov	19:00	Petron Blaze Spikers	3–1	Foton Tornadoes Blue Energy	25–10	20–25	25–16	25–8	–	95–59	
29 Nov	16:15	Foton Tornadoes Blue Energy	0–3	Smart Giga Hitters	21–25	19–25	18–25	–	–	58–75	
01 Dec	16:00	Petron Blaze Spikers	3–0	Smart Giga Hitters	25–23	25–13	25–12	–	–	75–48	
04 Dec	16:00	Foton Tornadoes Blue Energy	3–1	Sta. Lucia Lady Realtors	25–23	23–25	25–20	25–18	–	98–86	

=== Group B ===
Pos	Team	Pld	W	L	Pts	SW	SL	SR	SPW	SPL	SPR
1	F2 Logistics Cargo Movers	10	8	2	24	26	7	3.714	789	607	1.300
2	Generika–Ayala Lifesavers	10	6	4	20	22	15	1.467	825	738	1.118
3	Cignal HD Spikers	10	5	5	13	18	20	0.900	811	837	0.969
4	Cocolife Asset Managers	10	1	9	4	10	29	0.345	737	897	0.822

Date	Time		Score		Set 1	Set 2	Set 3	Set 4	Set 5	Total	Report
24 Nov	18:00	F2 Logistics Cargo Movers	3–0	Cocolife Asset Managers	25–12	25–15	25–17	–	–	75–44	
27 Nov	16:15	Generika–Ayala Lifesavers	3–1	Cignal HD Spikers	25–21	27–25	22–25	25–16	–	99–87	
29 Nov	14:00	F2 Logistics Cargo Movers	3–1	Cignal HD Spikers	25–22	23–25	25–14	25–17	–	98–78	
29 Nov	19:00	Generika–Ayala Lifesavers	3–0	Cocolife Asset Managers	25–15	25–17	25–11	–	–	75–43	
01 Dec	18:00	F2 Logistics Cargo Movers	3–0	Generika–Ayala Lifesavers	25–12	25–20	25–22	–	–	75–54	
04 Dec	16:00	Cignal HD Spikers	3–1	Cocolife Asset Managers	25–17	25–22	22–25	25–23	–	97–87	

== Combined records ==
Pos	Team	Pld	W	L	Pts	SW	SL	SR	SPW	SPL	SPR
1	Petron Blaze Spikers	10	10	0	30	30	3	10.000	819	551	1.486
2	F2 Logistics Cargo Movers	10	8	2	24	26	7	3.714	789	607	1.300
3	Generika–Ayala Lifesavers	10	6	4	20	22	15	1.467	825	738	1.118
4	Foton Tornadoes Blue Energy	10	6	4	17	20	18	1.111	791	825	0.959
5	Cignal HD Spikers	10	5	5	13	18	20	0.900	811	837	0.969
6	Smart Giga Hitters	10	4	6	11	12	20	0.600	648	729	0.889
7	Cocolife Asset Managers	10	1	9	4	10	29	0.345	737	897	0.822
8	Sta. Lucia Lady Realtors	10	0	10	1	4	30	0.133	595	828	0.719

== Playoffs ==
Quarter-finals; One-game playoff
PET	3
SLR	0
FOT	1
CHD	3
FTL	3
CCL	0
GAL	3
SMA	0

Semi-finals; Twice-to-beat higher seed
PET	3
CHD	0
FTL	3
GAL	2

Finals; Best-of-three series
PET	2
FTL	1
Bronze medal match
GAL	3
CHD	0

=== Quarterfinals ===
Date	Time		Score		Set 1	Set 2	Set 3	Set 4	Set 5	Total	Report
06 Dec	16:15	Generika–Ayala Lifesavers	3–0	Smart Giga Hitters	25–16	26–24	25–22	–	–	76–62	
06 Dec	19:00	Petron Blaze Spikers	3–0	Sta. Lucia Lady Realtors	25–12	25–14	25–16	–	–	75–42	
08 Dec	16:00	Foton Tornadoes Blue Energy	1–3	Cignal HD Spikers	28–26	19–25	19–25	18–25	–	84–101	
08 Dec	18:00	F2 Logistics Cargo Movers	3–0	Cocolife Asset Managers	25–12	25–22	25–20	–	–	75–54	

=== Semifinals ===
Twice-to-beat higher seed (*)

Date	Time		Score		Set 1	Set 2	Set 3	Set 4	Set 5	Total	Report
11 Dec	16:15	F2 Logistics Cargo Movers*	3–2	Generika–Ayala Lifesavers	21–25	25–15	25–20	19–25	15–5	105–90	
11 Dec	19:00	Petron Blaze Spikers*	3–0	Cignal HD Spikers	25–21	25–20	25–16	–	–	75–57	

=== Bronze match ===
Date	Time		Score		Set 1	Set 2	Set 3	Set 4	Set 5	Total	Report
15 Dec	16:00	Generika–Ayala Lifesavers	3–0	Cignal HD Spikers	25–12	30–28	25–13			80–53	

=== Finals ===
Best-of-three series

Date	Time		Score		Set 1	Set 2	Set 3	Set 4	Set 5	Total	Report
15 Dec	18:00	Petron Blaze Spikers	3–0	F2 Logistics Cargo Movers	25–23	25–11	25–17			75–51	
18 Dec	19:00	F2 Logistics Cargo Movers	3–1	Petron Blaze Spikers	21–25	25–19	25–20	25–17		96–81	
20 Dec	19:00	Petron Blaze Spikers	3–0	F2 Logistics Cargo Movers	25–22	26–24	25–23			76–69	

== Final standing ==
Rank	Team
1st place, gold medalist(s)	Petron Blaze Spikers
2nd place, silver medalist(s)	F2 Logistics Cargo Movers
3rd place, bronze medalist(s)	Generika–Ayala Lifesavers
4	Cignal HD Spikers
5	Foton Tornadoes Blue Energy
6	Smart Giga Hitters
7	Cocolife Asset Managers
8	Sta. Lucia Lady Realtors

2018 All Filipino Conference Champions
Petron Blaze Spikers
Team roster
Ces Molina (c). Ria Duremdes (libero), Ging Balse-Pabayo, Bernadeth Pons, Mika Reyes, Jasmine Alcayde, Aiza Maizo-Pontillas, Rhea Dimaculangan, Chlodia Cortez, Angelica Legacion, Cherry Rondina, Carmela Tunay, Princess Gaiser (libero), Shaq de los Santos (head coach)

== Individual awards ==
Award		Name/Team
MVP		(Philippines) Rhea Dimaculangan (Petron Blaze Spikers)
Best Outside Spiker	1st:	(Philippines) Rachel Daquis (Cignal HD Spikers)
Best Outside Spiker	2nd:	(Philippines) Patty Jane Orendain (Generika–Ayala Lifesavers)
Best Middle Blocker	1st:	(Philippines) Ria Meneses (Generika–Ayala Lifesavers)
Best Middle Blocker	2nd:	(Philippines) Mary Joy Baron (F2 Logistics Cargo Movers)
Best Opposite Spiker		(Philippines) Aiza Maizo-Pontillas (Petron Blaze Spikers)
Best Setter		(Philippines) Kim Fajardo (F2 Logistics Cargo Movers)
Best Libero		(Philippines) Kath Arado (Generika–Ayala Lifesavers)
Best Scorer		(Philippines) Mylene Paat (Cignal HD Spikers)

== Venues ==
- Filoil Flying V Arena (main venue)
- Mall of Asia Arena (semifinals and finals)

== Broadcast partners ==
- ESPN 5: The 5 Network, AksyonTV, Hyper (SD and HD), ESPN5.com
