= List of Philippine Super Liga champions =

Each conference in the Philippine Super Liga (PSL) culminates with a final series between the top two teams. In most conferences, the championship is a best-of-three series.

== Women's division ==
=== Champions ===
The parentheses indicate the number of times that teams have appeared in a PSL Finals as well as each respective team's PSL Finals record up to that point.

Season	Conference	Winning team	Coach	Result	Losing team	Coach	Ref.
2013	Invitational	TMS–Philippine Army Lady Troopers (1, 1–0)	Enrico de Guzman	3–1 (Note: Played as a single match.)	Cignal HD Spikers (1, 0–1)	Sammy Acaylar	
2013	Grand Prix	TMS–Philippine Army Lady Troopers (2, 2–0)	Enrico de Guzman	3–1	Cignal HD Spikers (2, 0–2)	Sammy Acaylar	
2014	All-Filipino	Generika–Army Lady Troopers (3, 3–0)	Enrico de Guzman	3–0	RC Cola–Air Force Raiders (1, 0–1)	Clarence Esteban	
2014	Grand Prix	Petron Blaze Spikers (1, 1–0)	George Pascua	3–1	Generika Lifesavers (1, 0–1)	Ramil de Jesus	
2015	All-Filipino	Petron Blaze Spikers (2, 2–0)	George Pascua	2–0	Shopinas.com Lady Clickers (1, 0–1)	Ramil de Jesus	
2015	Grand Prix	Foton Tornadoes (1, 1–0)	Ponce de Leon	2–1	Petron Blaze Spikers (3, 2–1)	George Pascua	
2016	Invitational	RC Cola–Army Troopers (4)	Kungfu Reyes	—N/a (Note: The 2016 and 2017 Invitational Conference finals featured a round-robin format with two champions declared for each. For the purposes of this table, the "losing team" is the runner-up of the conference and finals win-loss records are not counted nor shown.)	Est Cola (Note: Guest team.) (1)	Chamnan Dokmai	
2016	All-Filipino	F2 Logistics Cargo Movers (1, 1–0)	Ramil de Jesus	2–1	Foton Tornadoes (2, 1–1)	Ponce de Leon	
2016	Grand Prix	Foton Tornadoes (3, 2–1)	Moro Branislav	2–0	Petron Tri-Activ Spikers (4, 2–2)	Shaq Delos Santos	
2017	Invitational	Kobe Shinwa Women's University (1)	Kiyokazu Yamamoto	—N/a	Cignal HD Spikers (3)	George Pascua	
2017	All-Filipino	Petron Blaze Spikers (5, 3–2)	Shaq Delos Santos	2–0	F2 Logistics Cargo Movers (2, 1–1)	Ramil de Jesus	
2017	Grand Prix	F2 Logistics Cargo Movers (3, 2–1)	Ramil de Jesus	2–1	Petron Blaze Spikers (6, 3–3)	Shaq Delos Santos	
2018	Grand Prix	Petron Blaze Spikers (7, 4–3)	Shaq Delos Santos	2–1	F2 Logistics Cargo Movers (4, 2–2)	Arnold Laniog	
2018	Invitational	F2 Logistics Cargo Movers (5, 3–2)	Ramil de Jesus	2–0	Petron Blaze Spikers (8, 4–4)	Shaq Delos Santos	
2018	All-Filipino	Petron Blaze Spikers (9, 5–4)	Shaq Delos Santos	2–1	F2 Logistics Cargo Movers (6, 3–3)	Ramil de Jesus	
2019	Grand Prix	Petron Blaze Spikers (10, 6–4)	Shaq Delos Santos	2–1	F2 Logistics Cargo Movers (7, 3–4)	Ramil de Jesus	
2019	All-Filipino	F2 Logistics Cargo Movers (8, 4–4)	Ramil de Jesus	2–0	Cignal HD Spikers (4, 1–2)	Edgar Barroga	
2019	Invitational	F2 Logistics Cargo Movers (9, 5–4)	Ramil de Jesus	2–3	Petron Blaze Spikers (11, 6–5)	Shaq Delos Santos	
2020	Grand Prix	Cancelled					
