= 2021 Philippine Super Liga season =

- Duration: February 2021
- Teams: 8
- Beach Challenge champions: Abanse Negrense (A)
- Beach Challenge runners-up: Sta. Lucia (A)

Seasons
- ← 2020

The 2021 Philippine Super Liga season was the ninth and final season of the Philippine Super Liga (PSL). This season was originally planned to have three conferences, but didn't push through due to the exodus of teams within the league.

The only tournament that occurred this season was the Beach Volleyball Challenge Cup. By the end of the tournament, all five of the remaining member teams had jumped ship to the now-professional rival Premier Volleyball League, resulting in the league's dissolution.

== Team exodus ==
On November 12, 2020, the rival Premier Volleyball League announced its intent to turn into a professional league. Around the same time, the Philippine Super Liga decided it would not make a similar move as it would bar the league from having players from the collegiate level. The league stated that the only method for them to turn pro is through a merger of the two leagues, which the two leagues have discussed prior to the pandemic. In December 2020, the PSL announced that the Generika–Ayala Lifesavers, Marinerang Pilipina Lady Skippers, and Petron Blaze Spikers would all be taking a leave of absence for the 2021 season due to the pandemic.

On February 4, 2021, Cignal TV announced that it had acquired the broadcast rights to the Premier Volleyball League under a three-year deal. Coinciding with the new deal, the Cignal HD Spikers and its sister team, the PLDT High Speed Hitters, would also transfer to the PVL. Cignal's new partnership left a bad taste for the PSL since its broadcast rights were handled by the affiliate TV5 Network, which eventually led to the league to terminate their partnership with the network. By the time the PSL started the 2021 Beach Volleyball Challenge Cup, they only had three active member teams: the Chery Tiggo Crossovers, F2 Logistics Cargo Movers, and Sta. Lucia Lady Realtors.

On March 9, Chery Tiggo and Sta. Lucia announced that they would move to the Premier Volleyball League, which left F2 Logistics as the sole active Philippine Super Liga team. Following a movement in social media, F2 Logistics announced on March 11 that they would also move to the PVL. This brought the PVL to twelve member teams (later reduced to ten) while the PSL was left with zero active teams. This forced the league to cancel the planned All-Filipino Conference, which would have been the first of the season.

On the same day as F2 Logistics' departure from the league, the PSL released a statement that it will still be active in sports development and maintained that the departure of its clubs to the PVL was done in amicable terms. In 2022, Athletic Events & Sports Management Group (ACES), the PSL's organizers, established the Shakey's Super League.

== Beach volleyball ==
The final tournament in the league's history, the 2021 Beach Volleyball Challenge Cup, was held from February 26 to 28 at the Subic Tennis Center. Unlike prior iterations, this edition did not feature a men's tournament.

2021 PSL Beach Volleyball Challenge Cup teams (Women's Division)
| Abbr. | Team | Company | Colors | Players |
|---|---|---|---|---|
| AN-A | Abanse Negrense (Team A) | Volleyball Association of Negros Island Inc. Province of Negros Occidental | | Alexa Polidario and Erjan Magdato |
| AN-B | Abanse Negrense (Team B) | Volleyball Association of Negros Island Inc. Province of Negros Occidental | | Jennifer Cosas and Gelimae Villanueva |
| F2L | F2 Logistics Cargo Movers | F2 Global Logistics Inc. | | Jenny Mar Senares and Kyla Angela Gallego |
| KEN | Kennedy Solar Energy | Kennedy Energy and Development Corp. | | Ariane Luna Alarcon and Christina Canares |
| SLR-A | Sta. Lucia (Team A) | Sta. Lucia Realty and Development Corporation | | Dhannylaine Demontaño and Jackielyn Estoquia |
| SLR-B | Sta. Lucia (Team B) | Sta. Lucia Realty and Development Corporation | | Bang Pineda and Jonah Sabete |
| TOB | Toby's Sports | Toby's Sports | | Jonah San Pedro and Javen Sabas |
| UAI | United Auctioneers | United Asia Automotive Group, Inc. | | Ella Viray and Theresa Ramos |

Playoffs:

Fifth place match
B3 | United Auctioneers | 0
A3 | F2 Logistics | 2
Seventh place match
B4 | Toby's Sports | 2
A4 | Kennedy Solar Energy | 0

5th–8th classification
B3 | United Auctioneers | 2
B4 | Toby's Sports | 1
A4 | Kennedy Solar Energy | 0
A3 | F2 Logistics | 2

Quarterfinals
A1 | Sta. Lucia (B) | 2
B3 | United Auctioneers | 1
A2 | Abanse Negrense (A) | 2
B4 | Toby's Sports | 0
B1 | Abanse Negrense (B) | 2
A4 | Kennedy Solar Energy | 0
B2 | Sta. Lucia (A) | 2
A3 | F2 Logistics | 0

Semifinals
A1 | Sta. Lucia (B) | 0
A2 | Abanse Negrense (A) | 2
B1 | Abanse Negrense (B) | 1
B2 | Sta. Lucia (A) | 2

Finals
A2 | Abanse Negrense (A) | 2
B2 | Sta. Lucia (A) | 0
Third place match
A1 | Sta. Lucia (B) | 0
B1 | Abanse Negrense (B) | 2

Final standing:

| Rank | Team |
|---|---|
| 1st place, gold medalist(s) | Abanse Negrense (Team A) |
| 2nd place, silver medalist(s) | Sta. Lucia Lady Realtors (Team A) |
| 3rd place, bronze medalist(s) | Abanse Negrense (Team B) |
| 4 | Sta. Lucia Lady Realtors (Team B) |
| 5 | F2 Logistics Cargo Movers |
| 6 | United Auctioneers |
| 7 | Toby's Sports |
| 8 | Kennedy Solar Energy |

2021 Philippine Super Liga Beach Challenge Cup
Abanse Negrense (Team A)
1st title (Beach)
Team Roster
Alexa Polidario and Erjan Magdato
