= 2019 Philippine Super Liga Invitational Conference =

Third indoor conference of the 2019 Philippine Super Liga season

- Duration: September 23 – October 17, 2019
- Teams: 8
- TV partner(s): ESPN 5, 5 Plus, One Sports, ESPN Player (Online)

Results
- Champions: F2 Logistics Cargo Movers
- Runners-up: Petron Blaze Spikers
- Third place: Cignal HD Spikers
- Fourth place: Foton Tornadoes Blue Energy

Awards
- MVP: Majoy Baron
- Best OH: Sisi Rondina; Shaya Adorador
- Best MB: Majoy Baron; Roselyn Doria
- Best OPP: Aiza Maizo-Pontillas
- Best Setter: Angelica Legacion
- Best Libero: Jennylyn Reyes

PSL Invitational Conference chronology
- < 2018

PSL conference chronology
- < 2019 All-Filipino 2020 Grand Prix >
- 2019 Super Cup >

The 2019 Philippine Super Liga Invitational Conference was the 19th indoor volleyball conference of the Philippine Super Liga, the fourth conference of the 2019 season, and the 24th conference overall. The tournament commenced on September 23, 2019 at the Strike Gymnasium in Bacoor, Cavite with opening ceremonies held on September 28 at Ynares Sports Arena in Pasig. The tournament eventually ended on October 17.

For the seventh time in eight conference, the championship came down between the F2 Logistics Cargo Movers and the Petron Blaze Spikers, the latter of which had missed the 2019 All-Filipino Conference finals. F2 Logistics defended their title to earn their fifth league title.

It would also end up being the last indoor conference that was completed by the league. The following conference, the 2020 Grand Prix, was suspended due to the COVID-19 pandemic while the 2021 season didn't feature any indoor conferences as the league became defunct.

== Teams ==
2019 Philippine Super Liga Invitational Conference
Abbr.	Team	Affiliation	Head coach	Team captain
CHD	Cignal HD Spikers	Cignal TV, Inc.	Edgar Barroga	Rachel Daquis
FTL	F2 Logistics Cargo Movers	F2 Global Logistics Inc.	Ramil de Jesus	Aby Maraño
FOT	Foton Tornadoes Blue Energy	United Asia Automotive Group, Inc.	Aaron Velez	Shaya Adorador
GAL	Generika–Ayala Lifesavers	Actimed, Inc.	Sherwin Meneses	Angeli Pauline Araneta
MPS	Marinerang Pilipina Lady Skippers	Marinerang Pilipina Group	Ronald Dulay	Ivy Remulla
PET	Petron Blaze Spikers	Petron Corporation	Shaq Delos Santos	Frances Molina
PHF	PLDT Home Fibr Hitters	PLDT	Roger Gorayeb	Rysabelle Devanadera
SLR	Sta. Lucia Lady Realtors	Sta. Lucia Realty and Development Corporation	Raymund Castillo	Amanda Villanueva

== Format ==
First round

- The first round was a single round-robin tournament, with each team playing one match against all other teams in their pool for a total of three matches.

Second round

- In the second round, teams were assigned to new pools. Results from the first round do not carry over.
- The second round was also a single round-robin, with each team playing three additional matches.
- The top two teams from each pool based on results from the second round advanced to the semifinals whil the bottom two were eliminated.

Semifinals

- The semifinals featured single-elimination matches.
- The match-ups were as follows:
  - SF1: A1 vs. B2
  - SF2: B1 vs. A2
- The winners advanced to the championship match while the losers would play in the third-place match.

Finals

- Both the championship match and third-place match were single-elimination.
- The match-ups were as follows:
  - Championship match: Semifinal round winners
  - Third-place match: Semifinal round losers

== Preliminary round ==
=== Round 1 ===
==== Pool A ====
Pos	Team	Pld	W	L	Pts	SW	SL	SR	SPW	SPL	SPR
1	Cignal HD Spikers	3	3	0	9	9	0	MAX	225	143	1.573
2	Foton Tornadoes Blue Energy	3	1	2	3	4	6	0.667	206	216	0.954
3	PLDT Home Fibr Hitters	3	1	2	3	3	6	0.500	170	201	0.846
4	Sta. Lucia Lady Realtors	3	1	2	3	3	7	0.429	194	235	0.826

Date	Time		Score		Set 1	Set 2	Set 3	Set 4	Set 5	Total	Report
24 Sep	16:00	Foton Tornadoes Blue Energy	1–3	Sta. Lucia Lady Realtors	25–13	18–25	23–25	19–25		85–88	
24 Sep	18:00	Cignal HD Spikers	3–0	PLDT Home Fibr Hitters	25–19	25–8	21–15			71–42	
28 Sep	14:00	Sta. Lucia Lady Realtors	0–3	PLDT Home Fibr Hitters	19–25	19–25	13–25			51–75	
28 Sep	18:00	Cignal HD Spikers	3–0	Foton Tornadoes Blue Energy	25–18	25–18	25–10			75–46	
01 Oct	14:00	PLDT Home Fibr Hitters	0–3	Foton Tornadoes Blue Energy	15–25	20–25	18–25			53–75	
01 Oct	14:00	Cignal HD Spikers	3–0	Sta. Lucia Lady Realtors	25–18	25–23	25–14			75–55	

==== Pool B ====
Pos	Team	Pld	W	L	Pts	SW	SL	SR	SPW	SPL	SPR
1	Petron Blaze Spikers	3	3	0	9	9	0	MAX	225	166	1.355
2	F2 Logistics Cargo Movers	3	2	1	6	6	4	1.500	228	185	1.232
3	Generika–Ayala Lifesavers	3	1	2	3	4	6	0.667	198	224	0.884
4	Marinerang Pilipina Lady Skippers	3	0	3	0	0	9	0.000	149	225	0.662

Date	Time		Score		Set 1	Set 2	Set 3	Set 4	Set 5	Total	Report
24 Sep	14:00	Marinerang Pilipina Lady Skippers	0–3	Generika–Ayala Lifesavers	19–25	23–25	17–25			59–75	
28 Sep	14:00	F2 Logistics Cargo Movers	0–3	Petron Blaze Spikers	22–25	23–25	18–25			63–75	
01 Oct	16:00	F2 Logistics Cargo Movers	3–0	Marinerang Pilipina Lady Skippers	25–14	25–17	25–11			75–42	
01 Oct	18:00	Generika–Ayala Lifesavers	0–3	Petron Blaze Spikers	21–25	14–25	20–25			55–75	
08 Oct	16:00	F2 Logistics Cargo Movers	3–1	Generika–Ayala Lifesavers	15–25	25–16	25–13	25–14		90–68	
08 Oct	18:00	Petron Blaze Spikers	3–0	Marinerang Pilipina Lady Skippers	25–17	25–18	25–13			75–48	

=== Round 2 ===
==== Pool C ====
Pos	Team	Pld	W	L	Pts	SW	SL	SR	SPW	SPL	SPR	Qualification
1	Petron Blaze Spikers	3	3	0	9	9	3	3.000	287	235	1.221	Semifinals
2	Cignal HD Spikers	3	2	1	6	8	4	2.000	271	243	1.115	Semifinals
3	PLDT Home Fibr Hitters	3	1	2	3	4	6	0.667	220	228	0.965	
4	Marinerang Pilipina Lady Skippers	3	0	3	0	1	9	0.111	175	247	0.709	

Date	Time		Score		Set 1	Set 2	Set 3	Set 4	Set 5	Total	Report
08 Oct	14:00	Cignal HD Spikers	3–1	Sta. Lucia Lady Realtors	25–14	25–14	22–25	25–18		97–71	
10 Oct	14:00	Cignal HD Spikers	3–0	PLDT Home Fibr Hitters	25–22	25–19	25–20			75–61	
10 Oct	18:00	Petron Blaze Spikers	3–0	Marinerang Pilipina Lady Skippers	25–22	25–22	25–8			75–52	
12 Oct	14:00	Cignal HD Spikers	2–3	Petron Blaze Spikers	11–25	25–20	22–25	27–25	14–16	99–111	
12 Oct	18:00	Marinerang Pilipina Lady Skippers	0–3	PLDT Home Fibr Hitters	16–25	20–25	16–25			52–75	
13 Oct	18:00	PLDT Home Fibr Hitters	1–3	Petron Blaze Spikers	18–25	19–25	28–26	19–25		84–101	

==== Pool D ====
Pos	Team	Pld	W	L	Pts	SW	SL	SR	SPW	SPL	SPR	Qualification
1	F2 Logistics Cargo Movers	3	3	0	9	9	2	4.500	254	214	1.187	Semifinals
2	Foton Tornadoes Blue Energy	3	2	1	6	6	6	1.000	272	253	1.075	Semifinals
3	Sta. Lucia Lady Realtors	3	1	2	3	4	8	0.500	226	279	0.810	
4	Generika–Ayala Lifesavers	3	0	3	0	6	9	0.667	304	310	0.981	

Date	Time		Score		Set 1	Set 2	Set 3	Set 4	Set 5	Total	Report
08 Oct	16:00	F2 Logistics Cargo Movers	3–0	Foton Tornadoes Blue Energy	25–23	25–19	25–23			75–65	
08 Oct	18:00	Sta. Lucia Lady Realtors	3–2	Generika–Ayala Lifesavers	14–25	25–20	25–23	20–25	15–11	99–104	
10 Oct	16:00	Foton Tornadoes Blue Energy	3–1	Sta. Lucia Lady Realtors	25–27	25–15	25–22	25–11		100–75	
12 Oct	16:00	F2 Logistics Cargo Movers	3–2	Generika–Ayala Lifesavers	22–25	17–25	25–16	25–21	15–10	104–97	
13 Oct	13:00	Generika–Ayala Lifesavers	2–3	Foton Tornadoes Blue Energy	25–21	17–25	25–27	25–19	11–15	103–107	
13 Oct	15:00	F2 Logistics Cargo Movers	3–0	Sta. Lucia Lady Realtors	25–22	25–15	25–15			75–52	

== Playoffs ==
Semifinals
15 October
Petron Blaze Spikers	3
Foton Tornadoes Blue Energy	0
15 October
Cignal HD Spikers	1
F2 Logistics Cargo Movers	3

Finals
17 October
Petron Blaze Spikers	2
F2 Logistics Cargo Movers	3
Bronze match
17 October
Foton Tornadoes Blue Energy	0
Cignal HD Spikers	3

=== Semifinals ===
Date	Time		Score		Set 1	Set 2	Set 3	Set 4	Set 5	Total	Report
15 Oct	15:00	Petron Blaze Spikers	3–0	Foton Tornadoes Blue Energy	25–17	25–14	25–16			75–47	
15 Oct	17:00	Cignal HD Spikers	1–3	F2 Logistics Cargo Movers	25–22	22–25	21–25	21–25		89–97	

=== Bronze match ===
Date	Time		Score		Set 1	Set 2	Set 3	Set 4	Set 5	Total	Report
17 Oct	16:00	Foton Tornadoes Blue Energy	0–3	Cignal HD Spikers	22–25	15–25	17–25			54–75	

=== Finals ===
Date	Time		Score		Set 1	Set 2	Set 3	Set 4	Set 5	Total	Report
17 Oct	18:00	Petron Blaze Spikers	2–3	F2 Logistics Cargo Movers	22–25	19–25	25–17	25–22	12–15	103–104	

== Final standing ==
Rank	Team
1st place, gold medalist(s)	F2 Logistics Cargo Movers
2nd place, silver medalist(s)	Petron Blaze Spikers
3rd place, bronze medalist(s)	Cignal HD Spikers
4	Foton Tornadoes Blue Energy
5	PLDT Home Fibr Power Hitters
6	Sta. Lucia Lady Realtors
7	Generika–Ayala Lifesavers
8	Marinerang Pilipina Lady Skippers

2019 Invitational Conference Champions
F2 Logistics Cargo Movers
Team roster
Abigail Maraño (c). Dawn Macandili (libero), Tyler-Marie Kalei Mau, Maria Lourdes Clemente, Alexine Danielle Cabanos, Victonara Galang, Kim Fajardo, Mary Joy Baron, Kim Kianna Dy, Carmel June Saga (libero), Aduke Christine Ogunsanya, Michelle Katherine Morente, Michelle Cobb, Desiree Cheng, Ramil de Jesús (head coach)

== Individual awards ==
Award		Name/Team
MVP		(Philippines) Mary Joy Baron (F2 Logistics Cargo Movers)
Best Outside Spiker	1st:	(Philippines) Sisi Rondina (Petron Blaze Spikers)
Best Outside Spiker	2nd:	(Philippines) Shaya Adorador (Foton Tornadoes Blue Energy)
Best Middle Blocker	1st:	(Philippines) Mary Joy Baron (F2 Logistics Cargo Movers)
Best Middle Blocker	2nd:	(Philippines) Roselyn Doria (Cignal HD Spikers)
Best Opposite Spiker		(Philippines) Aiza Maizo-Pontillas (Petron Blaze Spikers)
Best Setter		(Philippines) Angelica Legacion (Petron Blaze Spikers)
Best Libero		(Philippines) Jennylyn Reyes (Foton Tornadoes Blue Energy)
Best Scorer		(Philippines) Sisi Rondina (Petron Blaze Spikers)

== Venues ==
- Filoil Flying V Arena
- Ynares Sports Arena

"Spike on Tour" venues

- Strike Gymnasium - Bacoor, Cavite
- Santa Rosa Multi-Purpose Complex
- Malolos Sports & Convention Center
- Caloocan Sports Complex

== Broadcast partners ==
- ESPN 5: 5 Plus, One Sports (SD and HD), ESPN5.com, ESPN Player (Online)
