= 2018 PSL season =

The 2018 PSL season may refer to:

- 2018 Pakistan Super League
- 2018 Philippine Super Liga season
