= 2020 Philippine Super Liga season =

- Duration: February to March 2020
- Teams: 8
- TV partner(s): One Sports, One Sports+
- Grand Prix champions: None awarded (cancelled)
- Grand Prix runners-up: None awarded (cancelled)

Seasons
- ← 2019 2021 →

The 2020 Philippine Super Liga season was the eighth season of the Philippine Super Liga (PSL). The season opened with the Grand Prix, but due to the COVID-19 pandemic and the imposition of enhanced community quarantine (ECQ) in Luzon, the Grand Prix was suspended on March 23, with its last matches being played behind closed doors on March 10.

The Beach Volleyball Challenge Cup was supposed to be held this season, but was cancelled due to weather conditions.

== Grand Prix ==
2020 Philippine Super Liga Grand Prix
- Duration: February 29 – March 3, 2020 (before suspension)
- Teams: 8
- TV partner(s): One Sports, One Sports+

PSL Grand Prix chronology
- < 2019

PSL conference chronology
- < 2019 Invitational
- < 2019 Super Cup 2021 BVCC >

The 2020 Philippine Super Liga Grand Prix was the 20th indoor volleyball conference of the Philippine Super Liga and the 25th conference overall. It was also the only conference to be held this season before the pandemic. It ended up being the PSL's final indoor volleyball conference.

=== Teams ===
2020 Philippine Super Liga Grand Prix
Abbr.	Team	Affiliation	Head coach	Players
CTC	Chery Tiggo Crossovers	United Asia Automotive Group, Inc.	Aaron Vélez	Tatjana Bokan
CHD	Cignal HD Spikers	Cignal TV, Inc.	Edgar Barroga	Rachel Daquis
FTL	F2 Logistics Cargo Movers	F2 Global Logistics Inc.	Ramil de Jesus	Lindsay Stalzer
GAL	Generika–Ayala Lifesavers	Actimed, Inc. / Ayala Corporation	Sherwin Meneses	Rhea Dimaculangan
MPS	Marinerang Pilipina Lady Skippers	Marinerang Pilipina Group	Vilet Ponce de Leon	Ivy Remulla
PET	Petron Blaze Spikers	Petron Corporation	Emil Lontoc	Khat Bell
PHF	PLDT Home Fibr Hitters	PLDT	Roger Gorayeb	Rysabelle Devanadera
SLR	Sta. Lucia Lady Realtors	Sta. Lucia Land Inc.	Eddison Orcullo	Shainah Joseph

=== Preliminary round ===
==== Team standings ====
Pos	Team	Pld	W	L	Pts	SW	SL	SR	SPW	SPL	SPR
1	F2 Logistics Cargo Movers	1	1	0	3	3	0	MAX	75	49	1.531
2	Petron Blaze Spikers	1	1	0	3	3	0	MAX	75	65	1.154
3	Sta. Lucia Lady Realtors	1	1	0	3	3	0	MAX	80	74	1.081
4	Cignal HD Spikers	1	1	0	3	3	1	3.000	94	83	1.133
5	Chery Tiggo Crossovers	1	1	0	3	3	1	3.000	102	91	1.121
6	Marinerang Pilipina	1	0	1	0	1	3	0.333	91	102	0.892
7	Generika–Ayala Lifesavers	2	0	2	0	1	6	0.167	148	169	0.876
8	PLDT Home Fibr Power Hitters	2	0	2	0	0	6	0.000	123	155	0.794

- All times are in Philippines Standard Time (UTC+08:00)

==== First round ====
Date	Time		Score		Set 1	Set 2	Set 3	Set 4	Set 5	Total	Report
29 Feb	17:00	Petron Blaze Spikers	3–0	Generika–Ayala Lifesavers	25–22	25–22	25–21			75–65	P2
29 Feb	19:00	PLDT Home Fibr Hitters	0–3	Sta. Lucia Lady Realtors	24–26	23–25	27–29			74–80	P2
03 Mar	15:00	Cignal HD Spikers	3–1	Generika–Ayala Lifesavers	19–25	25–18	25–20	25–10		94–73	P2
03 Mar	17:00	F2 Logistics Cargo Movers	3–0	PLDT Home Fibr Hitters	25–21	25–15	25–13			75–49	P2
03 Mar	19:00	Marinerang Pilipina Lady Skippers	1–3	Chery Tiggo Crossovers	20–25	29–27	21–25	21–25		91–102	P2

=== Venues ===
- Bacoor Strike Gym
- Filoil Flying V Centre

=== Brand ambassador ===
- Mary Joy Baron (2020)
