= 2019 PSL season =

The 2019 PSL season may refer to:

- 2019 Pakistan Super League
- 2019 Philippine Super Liga season
