= PSL–PVL merger =

Proposed merger between the Premier Volleyball League and Philippine Super Liga

The PSL–PVL merger was the proposed merger of the Philippines' top-flight women's volleyball leagues at the time, the Philippine Super Liga (PSL) and the Premier Volleyball League (PVL). The scheduling of both leagues has hampered the program of the Philippines national team and a merger of the two leagues was proposed to remedy the issue.

Two methods were proposed: a unified or adjusted calendar to minimize scheduling conflicts between both leagues or merging the two leagues together. A tournament between the top teams from both leagues was also planned named the Unity Cup but never came to fruition.

While the merger never went through, six PSL teams transferred to the PVL ahead of the latter's 2021 season.

== Background ==
In 2019, the two top-flight women's volleyball leagues in the Philippines were the Philippine Super Liga (PSL) and the Premier Volleyball League (PVL). Scheduling of both leagues, accounting for both match days and training, has often clashed with each other causing player availability issues for the Philippine national team. An example of the two league affecting the national team program was in the 2019 Southeast Asian Games where the women's national team did not medal while the men's national team clinched a silver medal finish. The men's national team does not experience scheduling conflicts as the women's.

The two leagues agreed in principle to initiate a merger of the two leagues as September 2019. However formal talks were suspended due to the COVID-19 pandemic.

There are at least two proposed methods on how a merger would be implemented. One is for the two leagues to come up with a "unified calendar", or a synchronized scheduling which would make all players competing in the two leagues available for the Philippine national league within a certain time window. This could be a prelude to an outright merger of the PSL and PVL into one unified league.

=== Unity Cup ===
As a lead up to a potential merger, the PSL and PVL plan to organize a tournament featuring sides from both leagues called the Unity Cup. Planning of the tournament started as early as December 2019. Planning for the tournament was stalled due to the Luzon enhanced community quarantine imposed in March 2020 due to the COVID-19 pandemic. Being discussed is the number of teams to participate. The PSL proposes a 16-team tournament with eight teams each from the two leagues participating while the PVL proposed a smaller 8-team tournament. Negotiations on the Unity Cup went into an impasse over disagreements on the proposed cup's number of teams. Additionally, the PVL's transition to a professional league and the elimination of a semi-professional classification also played a role in the cup, and later the merger as whole, falling through.

=== Aftermath ===
While the PSL and PVL did not merge, five of the PSL's teams moved to the PVL ahead of the 2021 Premier Volleyball League Open Conference. Those teams were the Chery Tiggo Crossovers, Cignal HD Spikers, F2 Logistics Cargo Movers, PLDT Home Fibr Power Hitters, and Sta. Lucia Lady Realtors. F2 Logistics opted out of the 2021 Open Conference and instead joined in the 2022 Open Conference. A sixth team, the Foton Tornadoes, Chery Tiggo's predecessor, later joined the 2023 Invitational Conference but departed afterwards.
