= 2021 Philippine Super Liga Beach Volleyball Challenge Cup =

Sixth edition of the Philippine Super Liga beach volleyball tournament

- Duration: February 26–28, 2021
- Teams: 8

Results
- Champions: Abanse Negrense (A)
- Runners-up: Sta. Lucia Lady Realtors (A)
- Third place: Abanse Negrense (B)
- Fourth place: Sta. Lucia Lady Realtors (B)

PSL Beach Volleyball Challenge Cup chronology
- < 2019

PSL conference chronology
- < 2020 Grand Prix

The 2021 Philippine Super Liga Beach Volleyball Challenge Cup (also known as the 2021 Gatorade Philippine Super Liga Beach Volleyball Challenge Cup due to sponsorship reasons) was the sixth and final running of the Philippine Super Liga Beach Volleyball Challenge Cup. The tournament was held on February 26 and 27, 2021 at the Subic Tennis Center of the Subic Bay Metropolitan Authority at Subic Bay.

The tournament marked the resumption of PSL games since the cancellation of the 2020 season due to the COVID-19 pandemic. The tournament was approved by the Inter-Agency Task Force for the Management of Emerging Infectious Diseases (IATF), through its Resolution 79, allowing the staging of the tournament using a bubble setup in Subic. It became the final tournament of the PSL.

A beach tournament was originally planned to be held in November 2020 as part of the cancelled 2020 campaign but postponed due to several factors, including the onslaught of Typhoon Goni (Rolly) and the COVID-19 pandemic. Unlike previous editions of the Beach Volleyball Challenge Cup, this year's edition did not feature a men's tournament.

== Teams ==
2021 Philippine Super Liga Beach Volleyball Challenge Cup
Abbr.	Team	Affiliation	Players
AN-A	Abanse Negrense (Team A)	Volleyball Association of Negros Island Inc. Province of Negros Occidental	Alexa Polidario; Erjan Magdato
AN-B	Abanse Negrense (Team B)	Volleyball Association of Negros Island Inc. Province of Negros Occidental	Jennifer Cosas; Gelimae Villanueva
F2L	F2 Logistics Cargo Movers	F2 Global Logistics Inc.	Jenny Mar Senares; Kyla Angela Gallego
KEN	Kennedy Solar Energy	Kennedy Energy and Development Corp.	Ariane Luna Alarcon; Christina Canares
SLR-A	Sta. Lucia (Team A)	Sta. Lucia Realty and Development Corporation	Dhannylaine Demontaño; Jackielyn Estoquia
SLR-B	Sta. Lucia (Team B)	Sta. Lucia Realty and Development Corporation	Bang Pineda; Jonah Sabete
TOB	Toby's Sports	Toby's Sports	Jonah San Pedro; Javen Sabas
UAI	United Auctioneers	United Asia Automotive Group, Inc.	Ella Viray; Theresa Ramos

== Preliminary round ==
=== Pool A ===
Pos	Team	Pld	W	L	Pts	SW	SL	SR	SPW	SPL	SPR
1	Sta. Lucia (B)	3	3	0	9	6	1	6.000	130	86	1.512
2	Abanse Negrense (A)	3	2	1	6	5	2	2.500	126	84	1.500
3	F2 Logistics	3	1	2	3	2	4	0.500	96	99	0.970
4	Kennedy Solar Energy	3	0	3	0	0	6	0.000	43	126	0.341

Date	Time		Score		Set 1	Set 2	Set 3	Total	Report
26 Feb	08:00	Sta. Lucia (B)	2–0	Kennedy Solar Energy	21–10	21–7		42–17	
26 Feb	10:00	F2 Logistics	0–2	Abanse Negrense (A)	15–21	12–21		27–42	
26 Feb	14:00	Sta. Lucia (B)	2–1	Abanse Negrense (A)	21–6	14–21	11–15	46–42	
26 Feb	15:00	F2 Logistics	2–0	Kennedy Solar Energy	21–9	21–6		42–15	
27 Feb	08:00	Abanse Negrense (A)	2–0	Kennedy Solar Energy	21–4	21–7		42-11	
27 Feb	10:00	F2 Logistics	0–2	Sta. Lucia (B)	14–21	13–21		27-42	

=== Pool B ===
Pos	Team	Pld	W	L	Pts	SW	SL	SR	SPW	SPL	SPR
1	Abanse Negrense (B)	3	3	0	9	6	1	6.000	126	90	1.400
2	Sta. Lucia (A)	3	2	1	6	5	2	2.500	130	100	1.300
3	United Auctioneers	3	1	2	3	2	4	0.500	93	105	0.886
4	Toby's Sports	3	0	3	0	0	6	0.000	79	126	0.627

Date	Time		Score		Set 1	Set 2	Set 3	Total	Report
26 Feb	09:00	United Auctioneers	0–2	Abanse Negrense (B)	12–21	12–21		24–42	
26 Feb	11:00	Sta. Lucia (A)	2–0	Toby's Sports	21–18	21–13		42–31	
26 Feb	16:00	United Auctioneers	2–0	Toby's Sports	21–16	21–15		42–21	
26 Feb	17:00	Sta. Lucia (A)	1–2	Abanse Negrense (B)	21–6	14–21	11–15	46–42	
27 Feb	09:00	Toby's Sports	0–2	Abanse Negrense (B)	11–21	9–21		20–42	
27 Feb	11:00	United Auctioneers	0–2	Sta. Lucia (A)	13–21	14–21		27–42	

== Playoffs ==
Fifth place match
B3	United Auctioneers	0
A3	F2 Logistics	2
Seventh place match
B4	Toby's Sports	2
A4	Kennedy Solar Energy	0

5th–8th classification
B3	United Auctioneers	2
B4	Toby's Sports	1
A4	Kennedy Solar Energy	0
A3	F2 Logistics	2

Quarterfinals
A1	Sta. Lucia (B)	2
B3	United Auctioneers	1
A2	Abanse Negrense (A)	2
B4	Toby's Sports	0
B1	Abanse Negrense (B)	2
A4	Kennedy Solar Energy	0
B2	Sta. Lucia (A)	2
A3	F2 Logistics	0

Semifinals
A1	Sta. Lucia (B)	0
A2	Abanse Negrense (A)	2
B1	Abanse Negrense (B)	1
B2	Sta. Lucia (A)	2

Finals
A2	Abanse Negrense (A)	2
B2	Sta. Lucia (A)	0
Third place match
A1	Sta. Lucia (B)	0
B1	Abanse Negrense (B)	2

=== Quarterfinals ===
Date	Time		Score		Set 1	Set 2	Set 3	Total	Report
27 Feb	14:00	Abanse Negrense (A)	2–0	Toby's Sports	21–12	21–11		42–23	
27 Feb	15:00	United Auctioneers	0–2	Sta. Lucia (B)	13–21	15–21		28–42	
27 Feb	16:00	F2 Logistics	1–2	Sta. Lucia (A)	21–16	10–21	10–15	41–52	
27 Feb	17:00	Kennedy Solar Energy	0–2	Abanse Negrense (B)	6–21	3–21		9–42	

=== 5th–8th classification ===
Date	Time		Score		Set 1	Set 2	Set 3	Total	Report
28 Feb	08:00	Toby's Sports	1–2	United Auctioneers	18–21	21–6	13–15	52–42	
28 Feb	09:00	F2 Logistics	2–0	Kennedy Solar Energy	21–9	21–9		42–18	

=== Semifinals ===
Date	Time		Score		Set 1	Set 2	Set 3	Total	Report
28 Feb	10:00	Abanse Negrense (A)	2–0	Sta. Lucia (B)	21–18	21–12		42–30	
28 Feb	11:00	Sta. Lucia (A)	2–1	Abanse Negrense (B)	21–18	16–21	15–9	52–48	

=== Seventh place match ===
Date	Time		Score		Set 1	Set 2	Set 3	Total	Report
28 Feb	14:00	Toby's Sports	2–0	Kennedy Solar Energy	21–14	21–14		42–28	

=== Fifth place match ===
Date	Time		Score		Set 1	Set 2	Set 3	Total	Report
28 Feb	15:00	F2 Logistics	2–0	United Auctioneers	21–14	21–11		42–25	

=== Third place match ===
Date	Time		Score		Set 1	Set 2	Set 3	Total	Report
28 Feb	16:00	Sta. Lucia (B)	0–2	Abanse Negrense (B)	13–21	20–22		33–43	

=== Finals ===
Date	Time		Score		Set 1	Set 2	Set 3	Total	Report
28 Feb	17:00	Abanse Negrense (A)	2–0	Sta. Lucia (A)	21–15	21–17		42–32	

== Final standing ==
Rank	Team
1st place, gold medalist(s)	Abanse Negrense (Team A)
2nd place, silver medalist(s)	Sta. Lucia Lady Realtors (Team A)
3rd place, bronze medalist(s)	Abanse Negrense (Team B)
4	Sta. Lucia Lady Realtors (Team B)
5	F2 Logistics Cargo Movers
6	United Auctioneers
7	Toby's Sports
8	Kennedy Solar Energy

2021 Philippine Super Liga Beach Volleyball Challenge Cup champions
Abanse Negrense (Team A)
1st beach volleyball title
Team roster
Alexa Polidario
Erjan Magdato

== Venue ==
- Subic Tennis Center (Subic Bay Metropolitan Authority)
