= 2018 Philippine Super Liga season =

- Duration: February 17 – December 21 2018
- TV partner(s): TV5, AksyonTV, Hyper, ESPN5.com
- Top draft pick: (no draft)
- Grand Prix champions: Petron Blaze Spikers
- Grand Prix runners-up: F2 Logistics Cargo Movers
- Beach Challenge champions: Women's: Petron; Men's: Foton
- Beach Challenge runners-up: Women's: Sta. Lucia (Team A); Men's: SM Sands
- Invitationals champions: F2 Logistics Cargo Movers
- Invitationals runners-up: Petron Blaze Spikers
- All-Filipino champions: Petron Blaze Spikers
- All-Filipino runners-up: F2 Logistics Cargo Movers
- Collegiate Grand Slam champions: UP Lady Maroons
- Collegiate Grand Slam runners-up: UST Growling Tigers

Seasons
- ← 2017 2019 →

The 2018 Philippine Super Liga season was the sixth season of the Philippine Super Liga (PSL). The season started with the Grand Prix followed by the Invitational Cup. The All-Filipino Conference was the last of the club conferences with the first and only edition of the Collegiate Grand Slam being held at the same time. The fourth edition of the Beach Volleyball Challenge Cup was also held in between the Grand Prix and Invitational Conferences.

== Indoor Volleyball ==
=== Grand Prix ===
2018 Philippine Super Liga Grand Prix
Abbr.	Team	Affiliation	Head coach	Team captain	Imports
CIG	Cignal HD Spikers	Cignal TV, Inc.	(Philippines) Edgar Barroga	(Philippines) Rachel Daquis	(United States) Jeane Horton (Bosnia and Herzegovina) Sonja Milanović
CCL	Cocolife Asset Managers	United Coconut Planters Life Assurance Corporation	(Serbia) Moro Branislav	(Serbia) Sara Klisura	(United States) Taylor Milton (withdrew) (Serbia) Sara Klisura (Serbia) Marta Drpa
F2L	F2 Logistics Cargo Movers	F2 Global Logistics Inc.	(Philippines) Arnold Laniog	(Philippines) Cha Cruz-Behag	(United States) Kennedy Lynne Bryan (Venezuela) María José Pérez (Japan) Minami Yoshioka
FOT	Foton Tornadoes Blue Energy	United Asia Automotive Group, Inc.	(Philippines) Rommel Abella	(Philippines) Dindin Santiago-Manabat	(United States) Brooke Kranda (withdrew) (Canada) Elizabeth Wendel (Serbia) Katarina Vukomanović (Trinidad and Tobago) Channon Thompson
GAL	Generika–Ayala Lifesavers	Actimed, Inc.	(Philippines) Sherwin Meneses	(Philippines) Angeli Pauline Araneta	(Trinidad and Tobago) Darlene Ramdin (United States) Symone Hayden (Mexico) Kimberly Gutierrez
PET	Petron Blaze Spikers	Petron Corporation	(Philippines) Shaq Delos Santos	(United States) Lindsay Stalzer	(United States) Hillary Hurley (withdrew) (United States) Lindsay Stalzer (Japan) Yuri Fukuda (United States) Khat Bell
SMA	Smart Prepaid Giga Hitters	Smart Communications	(Philippines) Ronald Dulay	(Philippines) Janet Serafica	(Cuba) Gyselle Silva (Serbia) Sanja Trivunović
SLR	Sta. Lucia Lady Realtors	Sta. Lucia Realty and Development Corporation	(Philippines) George Pascua	(Philippines) Pamela Tricia Lastimosa	(Ukraine) Bohdana Anisova (Canada) Kristen Moncks (Canada) Marisa Field

Standing:

Pos	Team	Pld	W	L	Pts	SW	SL	SR	SPW	SPL	SPR
1	F2 Logistics Cargo Movers	10	9	1	27	28	6	4.667	823	649	1.268
2	Petron Blaze Spikers	10	9	1	25	27	12	2.250	876	783	1.119
3	Cocolife Asset Managers	10	6	4	18	21	17	1.235	837	822	1.018
4	Foton Tornadoes	10	5	5	16	20	21	0.952	907	918	0.988
5	Sta. Lucia Lady Realtors	10	5	5	14	20	19	1.053	876	865	1.013
6	Cignal HD Spikers	10	3	7	9	14	23	0.609	829	844	0.982
7	Generika–Ayala Lifesavers	10	3	7	8	14	25	0.560	769	897	0.857
8	Smart Prepaid Giga Hitters	10	0	10	3	9	30	0.300	785	924	0.850

- All times are in Philippines Standard Time (UTC+08:00)

Playoffs:

Quarter-finals; One-game playoff
2018 PSL Grand Prix
FOT	1
SLR	0
FTL	1
SMA	0
PET	1
GAL	0
CCL	1
CIG	0

Semi-finals; Best-of-3 series
FOT	0
FTL	2
PET	2
CCL	0

Finals; Best-of-three series
FTL	1
PET	2
Bronze medal match
CCL	0
FOT	1

Final standing:

Rank	Team
1st place, gold medalist(s)	Petron Blaze Spikers
2nd place, silver medalist(s)	F2 Logistics Cargo Movers
3rd place, bronze medalist(s)	Foton Tornadoes Blue Energy
4	Cocolife Asset Managers
5	Sta. Lucia Lady Realtors
6	Cignal HD Spikers
7	Generika–Ayala Lifesavers
8	Smart Prepaid Giga Hitters

Awards:

Award		Name/Team
MVP		(United States) Lindsay Stalzer (Petron)
Best Outside Spiker	1st:	(Serbia) Sara Klisura (Cocolife)
Best Outside Spiker	2nd:	(Venezuela) María José Pérez (F2 Logistics)
Best Middle Blocker	1st:	(Philippines) Abigail Maraño (F2 Logistics)
Best Middle Blocker	2nd:	(Philippines) Mika Reyes (Petron)
Best Opposite Spiker	1st:	(Canada) Elizabeth Ann Wendel (Foton)
Best Opposite Spiker	2nd:	(United States) Kennedy Lynne Bryan (F2 Logistics)
Best Setter		(Philippines) Kim Fajardo (F2 Logistics)
Best Libero	1st:	(Japan) Minami Yoshioka (F2 Logistics)
Best Libero	2nd:	(Serbia) Katarina Vukomanović (Foton)
Best Scorer in a Match		(Cuba) Gyselle de la Caridad Silva (Smart), 56 points

=== Invitational ===
2018 Philippine Super Liga Invitational Cup
Abbr.	Team	Affiliation	Head coach	Team captain
Member teams
CIG	Cignal HD Spikers	Cignal TV, Inc.	(Philippines) Edgar Barroga	Rachel Daquis
CCL	Cocolife Asset Managers	United Coconut Planters Life Assurance Corporation	(Serbia) Moro Branislav	Aerieal Patnogon
FTL	F2 Logistics Cargo Movers	F2 Global Logistics Inc.	(Philippines) Ramil de Jesus	Cha Cruz-Behag
FOT	Foton Tornadoes Blue Energy	United Asia Automotive Group, Inc.	(Philippines) Edjet Mabbayad	Maika Ortiz
GAL	Generika–Ayala Lifesavers	Actimed, Inc.	(Philippines) Sherwin Meneses	Angeli Pauline Araneta
PET	Petron Blaze Spikers	Petron Corporation	(Philippines) Shaq delos Santos	Frances Molina
SMA	Smart−Army Giga Hitters	Smart Communications	(Philippines) Kungfu Reyes	Ging Balse
SLR	Sta. Lucia Lady Realtors	Sta. Lucia Realty and Development Corporation	(Philippines) George Pascua	Pamela Lastimosa
Collegiate teams
CHE	Cherrylume Iron Lady Warriors	University of the East / Mileage Asia Corporation	(Philippines) Rodrigo Roque	Lhara May Clavano
UPU	UP–United Auctioneers Lady Fighting Maroons	University of the Philippines Diliman / United Auctioneers, Inc.	(Kenya) Godfrey Okumu	Ma. Arielle Estrañero

Group A standing:

Pos	Team	Pld	W	L	Pts	SW	SL	SR	SPW	SPL	SPR	Qualification
1	Petron Blaze Spikers	4	3	1	10	11	5	2.200	385	328	1.174	Semifinals
2	F2 Logistics Cargo Movers	4	3	1	9	10	3	3.333	310	260	1.192	Quarterfinals
3	Generika–Ayala Lifesavers	4	3	1	7	9	8	1.125	375	360	1.042	Quarterfinals
4	Foton Tornadoes Blue Energy	4	1	3	4	6	10	0.600	338	356	0.949	Seventh place match
5	UP–United Auctioneers Lady Fighting Maroons	4	0	4	0	2	12	0.167	242	346	0.699	Ninth place match

Group B standing:

Pos	Team	Pld	W	L	Pts	SW	SL	SR	SPW	SPL	SPR	Qualification
1	Cignal HD Spikers	4	4	0	11	12	3	4.000	355	311	1.141	Semifinals
2	Smart-Army Giga Hitters	4	3	1	9	9	4	2.250	301	255	1.180	Quarterfinals
3	Sta. Lucia Lady Realtors	4	2	2	7	8	7	1.143	328	334	0.982	Quarterfinals
4	Cocolife Asset Managers	4	1	3	3	5	10	0.500	335	349	0.960	Seventh place match
5	Cherrylume Iron Lady Warriors	4	0	4	0	2	12	0.167	272	342	0.795	Ninth place match

Playoffs:

Quarterfinals
A3	GEN	0
B2	SMA	3
A2	FTL	3
B3	SLR	1

Semifinals
A1	PET	3
B2	SMA	0
B1	CIG	0
A2	FTL	3

Finals
A1	PET	2
A2	FTL	3

Final standing:

Rank	Team
1st place, gold medalist(s)	F2 Logistics Cargo Movers
2nd place, silver medalist(s)	Petron Blaze Spikers
3rd place, bronze medalist(s)	Cignal HD Spikers
4	Smart–Army Giga Hitters
5	Generika–Ayala Lifesavers
6	Sta. Lucia Lady Realtors
7	Foton Tornadoes Blue Energy
8	UP - United Auctioneers Inc. Lady Maroons
9	UE - Cherrylume Iron Lady Warriors
10	Cocolife Asset Managers

Individual awards:

Award		Name/Team
MVP		(Philippines) Victonara Galang (F2 Logistics)
Best Outside Spiker	1st:	(Philippines) Rachel Daquis (Cignal)
Best Outside Spiker	2nd:	(Philippines) Cherry Ann Rondina (Petron)
Best Middle Blocker	1st:	(Philippines) Mika Aereen Reyes (Petron)
Best Middle Blocker	2nd:	(Philippines) Mary Joy Baron (F2 Logistics)
Best Opposite Spiker		(Philippines) Aiza Maizo-Pontillas (Petron)
Best Setter		(Philippines) Kim Fajardo (F2 Logistics)
Best Libero		(Philippines) Dawn Macandili (F2 Logistics)
Best Scorer		(Philippines) Patty Jane Orendain (Generika-Ayala)

=== All-Filipino ===
2018 Philippine Super Liga All-Filipino Conference
Abbr.	Team	Affiliation	Head coach	Team captain
CHD	Cignal HD Spikers	Cignal TV, Inc.	(Philippines) Edgar Barroga	Rachel Daquis
CCL	Cocolife Asset Managers	United Coconut Planters Life Assurance Corporation	(Serbia) Moro Branislav	Margarita Anna Marie Tejada
FTL	F2 Logistics Cargo Movers	F2 Global Logistics Inc.	(Philippines) Ramil de Jesus	Cha Cruz-Behag
FOT	Foton Tornadoes Blue Energy	United Asia Automotive Group, Inc.	(Philippines) Aaron Velez	Maika Ortiz
GAL	Generika–Ayala Lifesavers	Actimed, Inc.	(Philippines) Sherwin Meneses	Angeli Pauline Araneta
PET	Petron Blaze Spikers	Petron Corporation	(Philippines) Shaq delos Santos	Frances Molina
SLR	Sta. Lucia Lady Realtors	Sta. Lucia Realty and Development Corporation	(Philippines) George Pascua	Pamela Lastimosa
SMA	Smart Giga Hitters	Smart Communications	(Philippines) Roger Gorayeb	Aiko Sweet Urdas

Preliminary round:

Pos	Team	Pld	W	L	Pts	SW	SL	SR	SPW	SPL	SPR
1	Petron Blaze Spikers	7	7	0	21	21	2	10.500	572	387	1.478
2	F2 Logistics Cargo Movers	7	5	2	15	17	6	2.833	541	431	1.255
3	Foton Tornadoes Blue Energy	7	5	2	14	16	11	1.455	576	569	1.012
4	Generika–Ayala Lifesavers	7	4	3	14	16	11	1.455	597	543	1.099
5	Cignal HD Spikers	7	4	3	10	13	13	1.000	559	553	1.011
6	Smart Giga Hitters	7	2	5	5	6	17	0.353	450	535	0.841
7	Cocolife Asset Managers	7	1	6	4	9	20	0.450	563	650	0.866
8	Sta. Lucia Lady Realtors	7	0	7	1	3	21	0.143	388	578	0.671

Rules for classification: 3 points = win match in 3 or 4 sets; 2 points = win match in 5 sets; 1 point = lose match in 5 sets; 0 point = lose match in 3 or 4 sets

Second round Group A:

Pos	Team	Pld	W	L	Pts	SW	SL	SR	SPW	SPL	SPR
1	Petron Blaze Spikers	10	10	0	30	30	3	10.000	819	551	1.486
2	Foton Tornadoes Blue Energy	10	6	4	17	20	18	1.111	791	825	0.959
3	Smart Giga Hitters	10	4	6	11	12	20	0.600	648	729	0.889
4	Sta. Lucia Lady Realtors	10	0	10	1	4	30	0.133	595	828	0.719

Second round Group B:

Pos	Team	Pld	W	L	Pts	SW	SL	SR	SPW	SPL	SPR
1	F2 Logistics Cargo Movers	10	8	2	24	26	7	3.714	789	607	1.300
2	Generika–Ayala Lifesavers	10	6	4	20	22	15	1.467	825	738	1.118
3	Cignal HD Spikers	10	5	5	13	18	20	0.900	811	837	0.969
4	Cocolife Asset Managers	10	1	9	4	10	29	0.345	737	897	0.822

Playoffs:

Quarter-finals; One-game playoff
2018 PSL All-Filipino Conference
PET	3
SLR	0
FOT	1
CHD	3
FTL	3
CCL	0
GAL	3
SMA	0

Semi-finals; Twice-to-beat higher seed
PET	3
CHD	0
FTL	3
GAL	2

Finals; Best-of-three series
PET	2
FTL	1
Bronze medal match
GAL	3
CHD	0

Final standing:

Rank	Team
1st place, gold medalist(s)	Petron Blaze Spikers
2nd place, silver medalist(s)	F2 Logistics Cargo Movers
3rd place, bronze medalist(s)	Generika–Ayala Lifesavers
4	Cignal HD Spikers
5	Foton Tornadoes Blue Energy
6	Smart Giga Hitters
7	Cocolife Asset Managers
8	Sta. Lucia Lady Realtors

Individual awards:

Award		Name/Team
MVP		(Philippines) Rhea Dimaculangan (Petron Blaze Spikers)
Best Outside Spiker	1st:	(Philippines) Rachel Daquis (Cignal HD Spikers)
Best Outside Spiker	2nd:	(Philippines) Patty Jane Orendain (Generika–Ayala Lifesavers)
Best Middle Blocker	1st:	(Philippines) Ria Meneses (Generika–Ayala Lifesavers)
Best Middle Blocker	2nd:	(Philippines) Mary Joy Baron (F2 Logistics Cargo Movers)
Best Opposite Spiker		(Philippines) Aiza Maizo-Pontillas (Petron Blaze Spikers)
Best Setter		(Philippines) Kim Fajardo (F2 Logistics Cargo Movers)
Best Libero		(Philippines) Kath Arado (Generika–Ayala Lifesavers)
Best Scorer		(Philippines) Mylene Paat (Cignal HD Spikers)

=== Collegiate Grand Slam ===
2018 PSL Collegiate Grand Slam teams
Abbr.	Team	School	Colors	Head coach	Team captain
CSA	CSA-Biñan Eagles	Colegio San Agustin – Biñan		(Philippines) Rey Anthony Beniga	(Philippines) Kristine Charlotte Hammond
DLD	DLSU-D Lady Patriots	De La Salle University – Dasmariñas		(Philippines) Joven Racelis	(Philippines) Eunice Gercie Castillo
FEU	FEU Lady Tamaraws	Far Eastern University		(Philippines) Rei Diaz Jr.	(Philippines) Lycha Ebon
UEC	UE Lady Warriors	University of the East		(Philippines) Rodrigo Roque	(Philippines) Roselle Baliton
UPD	UP Lady Maroons	University of the Philippines		(Kenya) Godfrey Okumu	(Philippines) Diana Mae Carlos
UST	UST Golden Tigresses	University of Santo Tomas		(Philippines) Emilio Reyes Jr.	(Philippines) Christine Dianne Francisco

Preliminary round:

Pos	Team	Pld	W	L	Pts	SW	SL	SR	SPW	SPL	SPR	Qualification
1	UST Golden Tigresses	5	5	0	15	15	2	7.500	409	301	1.359	Championship
2	UP Lady Maroons	5	4	1	12	12	5	2.400	407	345	1.180	Championship
3	UE Lady Warriors	5	2	3	7	10	9	1.111	432	384	1.125	Third place match
4	FEU Lady Tamaraws	5	2	3	6	9	11	0.818	398	410	0.971	Third place match
5	DLSU-D Lady Patriots	5	1	4	3	3	13	0.231	298	383	0.778	
6	CSA-Biñan Eagles	5	1	4	2	5	14	0.357	323	444	0.727	

Rules for classification: 3 points = win match in 3 or 4 sets; 2 points = win match in 5 sets; 1 point = lose match in 5 sets; 0 point = lose match in 3 or 4 sets

Final standing:

Rank	Team
1st place, gold medalist(s)	UP Lady Maroons
2nd place, silver medalist(s)	UST Golden Tigresses
3rd place, bronze medalist(s)	UE Lady Warriors
4	FEU Lady Tamaraws
5	DLSU-D Lady Patriots
6	CSA-Biñan Eagles

Individual awards:

Award		Name (team)
Most Valuable Player		Diana Mae Carlos (University of the Philippines)
Best Outside Spiker	1st:	Diana Mae Carlos (University of the Philippines)
Best Outside Spiker	2nd:	(Philippines) Mary Ann Mendrez (University of the East)
Best Middle Blocker	1st:	Aieshalaine Gannaban (University of the Philippines)
Best Middle Blocker	2nd:	(Philippines) Christine Dianne Francisco (University of Santo Tomas)
Best Opposite Spiker		(Philippines) Ejiya Laure (University of Santo Tomas)
Best Setter		(Philippines) Laizah Ann Bendong (University of the East)
Best Libero		(Philippines) Kathleen Faith Arado (University of the East)
Best Scorer		(Philippines) (Italy) Milena Alessandrini (University of Santo Tomas)

== Beach Volleyball ==
=== Women's ===
2018 PSL Beach Volleyball Challenge Cup teams (Women's Division)
Abbr.	Team	Company	Colors	Players
CIG	Cignal HD Spikers	Cignal TV, Inc.		Team A: Mylene Paat and Raphil Aguilar; Team B: Cherry May Vivas and Jannine Navarro
CCL	COCOLIFE Asset Managers	United Coconut Planters Life Assurance Corporation		Team A: Danika Gendrauli and Nerissa Bautista; Team B: Marge Tejada and Alexandria Denice Tan
F2L	F2 Logistics Cargo Movers	F2 Global Logistics Inc.		Fritz Joy Gallenero and Michelle Morente
FOT	Foton Tornadoes Blue Energy	United Asia Automotive Group, Inc.		Maria Nieza Viray and Jiziela Viray
GEN	Generika–Ayala Lifesavers	Erikagen, Inc.		Team A: Patty Jane Orendain and Fiola Ceballos; Team B: Sheeka Gin Espinosa and Shiela Marie Pineda
PET	Petron XCS	Petron Corporation		Cherry Ann Rondina and Bernadeth Pons
SMA	Smart Prepaid Giga Hitters	Smart Communications		Maria Cecilla Bangad and Caitlin Viray
SLR	Sta. Lucia Lady Realtors	Sta. Lucia Realty and Development Corporation		Team A: Dhannylaine Demontano and Jackielyn Estoquia; Team B: Jonah Sabete and Bianca Lizares

Playoffs:

Quarter-finals
B1	Sta. Lucia "A"	21	21
C2	Cignal "B"	8	13
D1	F2 Logistics	18	21	16
B2	Cignal "A"	21	15	14
A1	Petron	21	21
D2	Sta. Lucia "B"	5	11
C1	Foton	21	21
A2	Generika-Ayala "A"	9	16

Semi-finals
B1	Sta. Lucia "A"	21	21
D1	F2 Logistics	11	15
A1	Petron	21	21
A2	Generika-Ayala "A"	9	16

Final
B1	Sta. Lucia "A"	8	11
A1	Petron	21	21
Bronze medal match
D1	F2 Logistics	7	14
A2	Generika-Ayala "A"	21	21

Final standing:

Rank	Team
1st place, gold medalist(s)	Petron XCS
2nd place, silver medalist(s)	Sta. Lucia Lady Realtors (Team A)
3rd place, bronze medalist(s)	Generika–Ayala Lifesavers (Team A)
4	F2 Logistics Cargo Movers
5	Foton Tornadoes
6	Cignal HD Spikers (Team A)
7	Sta. Lucia Lady Realtors (Team B)
8	Cignal HD Spikers (Team B)

2018 Philippine Super Liga Beach Challenge Cup
Petron XCS
2nd title (Beach)
Team Roster
Sisi Rondina and Bernadeth Pons

=== Men's ===
2018 PSL Beach Volleyball Challenge Cup teams (Men's Division)
Abbr.	Team	Company	Colors	Players
CIG	Cignal HD Spikers	Cignal TV, Inc.		Mika Abria and Jessie Lopez
CCL	COCOLIFE Asset Managers	United Coconut Planters Life Assurance Corporation		Joshua Ylaya and JP Pareja
FOT	Foton Tornadoes Blue Energy	United Asia Automotive Group, Inc.		Kris Roy de Guzman and Lemuel Arbasto
NVY	Philippine Navy	Philippine Navy		Alsali Pajiji and Milover Parcon
SMA	Smart Prepaid Giga Hitters	Smart Communications		Philip Michael Bagalay and Gregory Utupo
SND	Sands SM by the Bay	SM Prime Holdings		Bryan Bagunas and James Natividad
TVM	Team Volleyball Manila	Team Volleyball Manila		Joven Camaganakan and Joseph Tipay
UST	UST Growling Tigers	University of Santo Tomas		Ian Lester Lee and Romnick Rico

Playoffs:

Semifinals
26 May
Sands SM	2
Smart	0
26 May
Cignal	0
Foton	2

Final
27 May
Sands SM	0
Foton	2
3rd place match
27 May
Smart	2
Cignal	0

Final standing:

Rank	Team
1st place, gold medalist(s)	Foton Tornadoes
2nd place, silver medalist(s)	Sands SM by the Bay
3rd place, bronze medalist(s)	Smart Prepaid Giga Hitters
4	Cignal HD Spikers
5	
6	
7	
8	

2018 Philippine Super Liga Beach Challenge Cup
Foton Tornadoes
1st title (Beach)
Team Roster
Lemuel Arbasto and Kris Roy Guzman

== All-star weekend ==
The PSL staged its all-star weekend at Silay, Negros Occidental on May 18 to 19, 2018, where two all-star games were played. The games were not televised.

== Brand ambassador ==
- Aby Maraño (2017 to 2018)
- Rachel Daquis (2018 to 2019)

== Broadcast partners ==
- TV5, AksyonTV, ESPN5.com
