= 2019 Philippine Super Liga season =

Volleyball league season in the Philippines

- Duration: February to November 2019
- TV partner(s): ESPN5, 5 Plus, One Sports, ESPN Player (online)
- Grand Prix champions: Petron Blaze Spikers
- Grand Prix runners-up: F2 Logistics Cargo Movers
- Beach Challenge champions: Women's: Petron XCS; Men's: Cignal HD Spikers
- Beach Challenge runners-up: Women's: Sta. Lucia-Santorini; Men's: Foton Tornadoes Blue Energy
- All-Filipino champions: F2 Logistics Cargo Movers
- All-Filipino runners-up: Cignal HD Spikers
- Invitational champions: F2 Logistics Cargo Movers
- Invitational runners-up: Petron Blaze Spikers

Seasons
- ← 2018 2020 →

The 2019 Philippine Super Liga season was the seventh season of the Philippine Super Liga (PSL). Like the previous season, the Grand Prix acted as the season-opening conference with the All-Filipino Conference succeeding it. The Invitational Conference was the culminating conference of the season. The fifth edition of the Beach Volleyball Challenge Cup was also held in between the Grand Prix and All-Filipino Conferences.

== Grand Prix ==
2019 Philippine Super Liga Grand Prix
| Abbr. | Team | Affiliation | Head coach | Team captain | Imports |
|---|---|---|---|---|---|
| CIG | Cignal HD Spikers | Cignal TV, Inc. | (Philippines) Edgar Barroga | (Philippines) Rachel Daquis | (United States) Erica Wilson (Azerbaijan) Anastasiya Artemeva |
| F2L | F2 Logistics Cargo Movers | F2 Global Logistics Inc. | (Philippines) Ramil de Jesus | (Philippines) Cha Cruz-Behag (United States) Lindsay Stalzer | (United States) Lindsay Stalzer (Italy) Rebecca Perry (withdrew) (Venezuela) María José Pérez |
| FOT | Foton Tornadoes Blue Energy | United Asia Automotive Group, Inc. | (Philippines) Aaron Vélez | (Philippines) Maika Ortiz | (United States) Courtney Felinski (Turkey) Selime İlyasoğlu (withdrew) (Spain) Milagros Collar |
| GAL | Generika–Ayala Lifesavers | Actimed, Inc. | (Philippines) Sherwin Meneses | (Philippines) Angeli Pauline Araneta | (Brazil) Nikolle del Rio (withdrew) (Azerbaijan) Kseniya Koçyiğit (Thailand) Kanjana Kuthaisong |
| PET | Petron Blaze Spikers | Petron Corporation | (Philippines) Shaq delos Santos | (United States) Khat Bell | (United States) Stephanie Niemer (United States) Khat Bell |
| PLD | PLDT Home Fibr Power Hitters | PLDT | (Philippines) Roger Gorayeb | (Philippines) Grethcel Soltones | (United Kingdom) Grace Lazard (United States) Kendra Dahlke |
| SLR | Sta. Lucia Lady Realtors | Sta. Lucia Realty and Development Corporation | (Philippines) Raymund Castillo | (Philippines) Pamela Tricia Lastimosa | (United States) Molly Lohman (United States) Casey Schoenlein |
| UVC | United Volleyball Club | United Volleyball Club | (Philippines) Joshua Ylaya | (Philippines) Kalei Mau | (United States) Yaasmeen Bedart-Ghani (United States) Shar Latai Manu-Olevao (withdrew) (Thailand) Sutadta Chuewulim |

Preliminary round:

| Pos | Team | Pld | W | L | Pts | SW | SL | SR | SPW | SPL | SPR | Qualification |
|---|---|---|---|---|---|---|---|---|---|---|---|---|
| 1 | Petron Blaze Spikers | 14 | 14 | 0 | 42 | 42 | 1 | 42.000 | 1073 | 699 | 1.535 | Twice-to-beat in quarterfinals |
| 2 | F2 Logistics Cargo Movers | 14 | 11 | 3 | 33 | 35 | 13 | 2.692 | 1037 | 956 | 1.085 | Twice-to-beat in quarterfinals |
| 3 | PLDT Home Fibr Power Hitters | 14 | 8 | 6 | 22 | 26 | 24 | 1.083 | 1090 | 1097 | 0.994 | Twice-to-beat in quarterfinals |
| 4 | Cignal HD Spikers | 14 | 7 | 7 | 20 | 23 | 28 | 0.821 | 1097 | 1123 | 0.977 | Twice-to-beat in quarterfinals |
| 5 | United Volleyball Club | 14 | 7 | 7 | 19 | 25 | 29 | 0.862 | 1046 | 1031 | 1.015 | Twice-to-win in quarterfinals |
| 6 | Generika–Ayala Lifesavers | 14 | 4 | 10 | 14 | 24 | 35 | 0.686 | 1197 | 1285 | 0.932 | Twice-to-win in quarterfinals |
| 7 | Foton Tornadoes Blue Energy | 14 | 3 | 11 | 11 | 16 | 36 | 0.444 | 1134 | 1250 | 0.907 | Twice-to-win in quarterfinals |
| 8 | Sta. Lucia Lady Realtors | 14 | 2 | 12 | 7 | 14 | 39 | 0.359 | 994 | 1226 | 0.811 | Twice-to-win in quarterfinals |

Playoffs:

Quarter-finals; Ranked 1 to 4 has twice-to-beat advantage
2019 Philippine Super Liga Grand Prix
(1) Petron Blaze Spikers | 2
(8) Sta. Lucia Lady Realtors | 0
(4) Cignal HD Spikers | 2
(5) United Volleyball Club | 0
(2) F2 Logistics Cargo Movers | 2
(7) Foton Tornadoes Blue Energy | 1
(3) PLDT Home Fibr Power Hitters | 2
(6) Generika–Ayala Lifesavers | 1

Semi-finals; Best-of-three series
Petron Blaze Spikers | 2
Cignal HD Spikers | 0
F2 Logistics Cargo Movers | 2
PLDT Home Fibr Power Hitters | 0

Finals; Best-of-three series
Petron Blaze Spikers | 2
F2 Logistics Cargo Movers | 1
Bronze medal match
Cignal HD Spikers | 2
PLDT Home Fibr Power Hitters | 3

Final standing:

| Rank | Team |
|---|---|
| 1st place, gold medalist(s) | Petron Blaze Spikers |
| 2nd place, silver medalist(s) | F2 Logistics Cargo Movers |
| 3rd place, bronze medalist(s) | PLDT Home Fibr Power Hitters |
| 4 | Cignal HD Spikers |
| 5 | United Volleyball Club |
| 6 | Generika–Ayala Lifesavers |
| 7 | Foton Tornadoes Blue Energy |
| 8 | Sta. Lucia Lady Realtors |

Individual awards:

| Award | | Name/Team |
|---|---|---|
| MVP | | (United States) Stephanie Niemer (Petron) |
| Best Outside Spikers | Foreign | (United States) Khat Bell (Petron) |
| Best Outside Spikers | Local | (Philippines) Ara Galang (F2 Logistics) |
| Best Middle Blockers | Foreign | (United Kingdom) Grace Lazard (PLDT) |
| Best Middle Blockers | Local | (Philippines) Aby Maraño (F2 Logistics) |
| Best Opposite Spikers | Foreign | (United States) Erika Wilson (Cignal) |
| Best Opposite Spikers | Local | (Philippines) Aiko Urdas (PLDT) |
| Best Setter | | (Philippines) Rhea Dimaculangan (Petron) |
| Best Libero | | (Philippines) Dawn Macandili (F2 Logistics) |
| Best Scorer | | (United States) Stephanie Niemer (Petron) |

=== All-Filipino ===
2019 Philippine Super Liga All-Filipino Conference
| Abbr. | Team | Affiliation | Head coach | Team captain |
|---|---|---|---|---|
| CHD | Cignal HD Spikers | Cignal TV, Inc. | Edgar Barroga | Rachel Daquis |
| FTL | F2 Logistics Cargo Movers | F2 Global Logistics Inc. | Ramil de Jesus | Aby Maraño |
| FOT | Foton Tornadoes Blue Energy | United Asia Automotive Group, Inc. | Aaron Velez | Carmina Aganon |
| GAL | Generika–Ayala Lifesavers | Actimed, Inc. | Sherwin Meneses | Angeli Pauline Araneta |
| MPS | Marinerang Pilipina Lady Skippers | Marinerang Pilipina Group | Ronald Dulay | Ivy Remulla |
| PET | Petron Blaze Spikers | Petron Corporation | Shaq Delos Santos | Frances Molina |
| PHF | PLDT Home Fibr Power Hitters | PLDT | Roger Gorayeb | Jerrili Malabanan |
| SLR | Sta. Lucia Lady Realtors | Sta. Lucia Realty and Development Corporation | Raymund Castillo | Pamela Lastimosa |

Preliminary round:

| Pos | Team | Pld | W | L | Pts | SW | SL | SR | SPW | SPL | SPR |
|---|---|---|---|---|---|---|---|---|---|---|---|
| 1 | Petron Blaze Spikers | 14 | 13 | 1 | 34 | 40 | 13 | 3.077 | 1236 | 968 | 1.277 |
| 2 | F2 Logistics Cargo Movers | 14 | 12 | 2 | 37 | 40 | 10 | 4.000 | 1183 | 925 | 1.279 |
| 3 | Foton Tornadoes Blue Energy | 14 | 8 | 6 | 25 | 31 | 23 | 1.348 | 1202 | 1150 | 1.045 |
| 4 | Generika–Ayala Lifesavers | 14 | 8 | 6 | 23 | 27 | 26 | 1.038 | 1144 | 1142 | 1.002 |
| 5 | Cignal HD Spikers | 14 | 7 | 7 | 24 | 30 | 26 | 1.154 | 1238 | 1164 | 1.064 |
| 6 | PLDT Home Fibr Power Hitters | 14 | 6 | 8 | 17 | 22 | 31 | 0.710 | 1096 | 1189 | 0.922 |
| 7 | Sta. Lucia Lady Realtors | 14 | 2 | 12 | 8 | 14 | 36 | 0.389 | 927 | 1181 | 0.785 |
| 8 | Marinerang Pilipina Lady Skippers | 14 | 0 | 14 | 0 | 3 | 42 | 0.071 | 824 | 1131 | 0.729 |

Rules for classification: 3 points = win match in 3 or 4 sets; 2 points = win match in 5 sets; 1 point = lose match in 5 sets; 0 point = lose match in 3 or 4 sets

Playoffs:

Quarter-finals; One-game playoff
2019 Philippine Super Liga All-Filipino Conference
Petron Blaze Spikers | 3
Marinerang Pilipina Lady Skippers | 0
Generika–Ayala Lifesavers | 1
Cignal HD Spikers | 3
F2 Logistics Cargo Movers | 3
Santa Lucia Lady Realtors | 0
Foton Tornadoes Blue Energy | 3
PLDT Home Fibr Power Hitters | 1

Semi-finals; Twice-to-beat higher seed
Petron Blaze Spikers | 2, 2
Cignal HD Spikers | 3, 3
F2 Logistics Cargo Movers | 3
Foton Tornadoes Blue Energy | 1

Finals; Best-of-three series
Cignal HD Spikers | 2, 0
F2 Logistics Cargo Movers | 3, 3
Bronze-medal match
Petron Blaze Spikers | 3
Foton Tornadoes Blue Energy | 2

Final standing:

| Rank | Team |
|---|---|
| 1st place, gold medalist(s) | F2 Logistics Cargo Movers |
| 2nd place, silver medalist(s) | Cignal HD Spikers |
| 3rd place, bronze medalist(s) | Petron Blaze Spikers |
| 4 | Foton Tornadoes Blue Energy |
| 5 | Generika–Ayala Lifesavers |
| 6 | PLDT Home Fibr Power Hitters |
| 7 | Sta. Lucia Lady Realtors |
| 8 | Marinerang Pilipina Lady Skippers |

Individual awards:

| Award | | Name/Team |
|---|---|---|
| MVP | | (United States) Tyler-Marie Kalei Mau (F2 Logistics Cargo Movers) |
| Best Outside Spiker | 1st: | (Philippines) Rachel Daquis (Cignal HD Spikers) |
| Best Outside Spiker | 2nd: | (Philippines) Sisi Rondina (Petron Blaze Spikers) |
| Best Middle Blocker | 1st: | (Philippines) Jaja Santiago (Foton Tornadoes Blue Energy) |
| Best Middle Blocker | 2nd: | (Philippines) Mary Joy Baron (F2 Logistics Cargo Movers) |
| Best Opposite Spiker | | (Philippines) Dindin Santiago-Manabat (Foton Tornadoes Blue Energy) |
| Best Setter | | (United States) Alohi Robins-Hardy (Cignal HD Spikers) |
| Best Libero | | (Philippines) Angelique Beatrice Dionela (Cignal HD Spikers) |
| Best Scorer | | (United States) Tyler-Marie Kalei Mau (F2 Logistics Cargo Movers) |

=== Invitational ===
2019 Philippine Super Liga Invitational Conference
| Abbr. | Team | Affiliation | Head coach | Team captain |
|---|---|---|---|---|
| CHD | Cignal HD Spikers | Cignal TV, Inc. | Edgar Barroga | Rachel Daquis |
| FTL | F2 Logistics Cargo Movers | F2 Global Logistics Inc. | Ramil de Jesus | Aby Maraño |
| FOT | Foton Tornadoes Blue Energy | United Asia Automotive Group, Inc. | Aaron Velez | Shaya Adorador |
| GAL | Generika–Ayala Lifesavers | Actimed, Inc. | Sherwin Meneses | Angeli Pauline Araneta |
| MPS | Marinerang Pilipina Lady Skippers | Marinerang Pilipina Group | Ronald Dulay | Ivy Remulla |
| PET | Petron Blaze Spikers | Petron Corporation | Shaq Delos Santos | Frances Molina |
| PHF | PLDT Home Fibr Hitters | PLDT | Roger Gorayeb | Rysabelle Devanadera |
| SLR | Sta. Lucia Lady Realtors | Sta. Lucia Realty and Development Corporation | Raymund Castillo | Amanda Villanueva |

Preliminary round:

| Pos | Team | Pld | W | L | Pts | SW | SL | SR | SPW | SPL | SPR |
|---|---|---|---|---|---|---|---|---|---|---|---|
| 1 | Petron Blaze Spikers | 6 | 6 | 0 | 17 | 18 | 2 | 9.000 | 512 | 401 | 1.277 |
| 2 | Cignal HD Spikers | 6 | 5 | 1 | 16 | 17 | 4 | 4.250 | 496 | 386 | 1.285 |
| 3 | F2 Logistics Cargo Movers | 6 | 5 | 1 | 14 | 15 | 6 | 2.500 | 482 | 399 | 1.208 |
| 4 | Foton Tornadoes Blue Energy | 6 | 3 | 3 | 8 | 10 | 12 | 0.833 | 478 | 469 | 1.019 |
| 5 | PLDT Home Fibr Power Hitters | 6 | 2 | 4 | 6 | 7 | 12 | 0.583 | 390 | 429 | 0.909 |
| 6 | Sta. Lucia Lady Realtors | 6 | 2 | 4 | 5 | 7 | 15 | 0.467 | 369 | 439 | 0.841 |
| 7 | Generika-Ayala Lifesavers | 6 | 1 | 5 | 6 | 10 | 15 | 0.667 | 502 | 534 | 0.940 |
| 8 | Marinerang Pilipina Lady Skippers | 6 | 0 | 6 | 0 | 1 | 18 | 0.056 | 304 | 472 | 0.644 |

Playoffs:

Semifinals
15 October
Petron Blaze Spikers | 3
Foton Tornadoes Blue Energy | 0
15 October
Cignal HD Spikers | 1
F2 Logistics Cargo Movers | 3

Finals
17 October
Petron Blaze Spikers | 2
F2 Logistics Cargo Movers | 3
Bronze match
17 October
Foton Tornadoes Blue Energy | 0
Cignal HD Spikers | 3

Final standing:

| Rank | Team |
|---|---|
| 1st place, gold medalist(s) | F2 Logistics Cargo Movers |
| 2nd place, silver medalist(s) | Petron Blaze Spikers |
| 3rd place, bronze medalist(s) | Cignal HD Spikers |
| 4 | Foton Tornadoes Blue Energy |
| 5 | PLDT Home Fibr Power Hitters |
| 6 | Sta. Lucia Lady Realtors |
| 7 | Generika–Ayala Lifesavers |
| 8 | Marinerang Pilipina Lady Skippers |

Individual awards:

| Award | | Name/Team |
|---|---|---|
| MVP | | (Philippines) Mary Joy Baron (F2 Logistics Cargo Movers) |
| Best Outside Spiker | 1st: | (Philippines) Sisi Rondina (Petron Blaze Spikers) |
| Best Outside Spiker | 2nd: | (Philippines) Shaya Adorador (Foton Tornadoes Blue Energy) |
| Best Middle Blocker | 1st: | (Philippines) Mary Joy Baron (F2 Logistics Cargo Movers) |
| Best Middle Blocker | 2nd: | (Philippines) Roselyn Doria (Cignal HD Spikers) |
| Best Opposite Spiker | | (Philippines) Aiza Maizo-Pontillas (Petron Blaze Spikers) |
| Best Setter | | (Philippines) Angelica Legacion (Petron Blaze Spikers) |
| Best Libero | | (Philippines) Jennylyn Reyes (Foton Tornadoes Blue Energy) |
| Best Scorer | | (Philippines) Sisi Rondina (Petron Blaze Spikers) |

=== Super Cup ===
The 2019 Philippine Super Liga Super Cup was a special three-day tournament that began on November 5, 2019. It featured the Philippine national team, two PSL selection teams (Team Shine and Team Sparkle) and the women's team of the University of Tsukuba of Japan.

The tournament was organized as part of the Philippine national team's participation in the 2019 Southeast Asian Games. University of Tsukuba won the PSL Super Cup title by winning all of its three games.

==== Teams ====
2019 PSL Super Cup teams
| Abbr. | Team | Colors | Head coach | Team captain |
|---|---|---|---|---|
| PHI | Philippine national team | | Cesael delos Santos | Aby Maraño |
| SHN | Team Shine | Various (dependent on PSL team) | Carl Dimaculangan | |
| SPK | Team Sparkle | Various (dependent on PSL team) | Vilet Ponce de Leon | |
| UOT | University of Tsukuba (Japan) | | Yasumi Nakanishi | |

Source: PSL

==== Results ====
| Date | Time | | Score | | Set 1 | Set 2 | Set 3 | Set 4 | Set 5 | Total | Report |
|---|---|---|---|---|---|---|---|---|---|---|---|
| Nov 5 | 17:00 | PSL Shine | 0–3 | Philippines | 14–25 | 18–25 | 16–25 | | | 48–75 | Report |
| Nov 5 | 19:00 | PSL Sparkle | 0–3 | University of Tsukuba | 8–25 | 12–25 | 20–25 | | | 40–75 | Report |
| Nov 7 | 17:00 | PSL Shine | 0–3 | University of Tsukuba | 10–25 | 16–25 | 16–25 | | | 42–75 | Report |
| Nov 7 | 19:00 | PSL Sparkle | 0–3 | Philippines | 12–25 | 18–25 | 18–25 | | | 48–75 | Report |
| Nov 8 | 17:00 | PSL Sparkle | 2–3 | PSL Shine | 25–15 | 25–19 | 20–25 | 22–25 | 15–17 | 107–101 | Report |
| Nov 8 | 19:00 | Philippines | 0–3 | University of Tsukuba | 13–25 | 21–25 | 19–25 | | | 53–75 | Report |

Source: PSL

Final standing:

| Rank | Team |
|---|---|
| 1st place, gold medalist(s) | University of Tsukuba |
| 2nd place, silver medalist(s) | Philippines |
| 3rd place, bronze medalist(s) | Team Shine |
| 4 | Team Sparkle |

2019 Philippine Super Liga Super Cup

1st title

== Beach volleyball ==
=== Women's ===
2019 PSL Beach Volleyball Challenge Cup teams (Women's Division)
| Abbr. | Team | Company | Colors | Players |
|---|---|---|---|---|
| CIG-A | Cignal HD Spikers (Team A) | Cignal TV, Inc. | | Roma Joy Doromal and Klymince Orellaneda |
| CIG-B | Cignal HD Spikers (Team B) | Cignal TV, Inc. | | Mary Landicho and Mary Jolyn Ebro |
| F2L | F2 Logistics Cargo Movers | F2 Global Logistics Inc. | | Michelle Morente and Fritz Joy Gallenero |
| GEN-A | Generika-Ayala Lifesavers (Team A) | Erikagen, Inc. | | Patty Jane Orendain and Fiola Ceballos |
| GEN-B | Generika-Ayala Lifesavers (Team B) | Erikagen, Inc. | | Angeli Araneta and Sheeka Gin Espinosa |
| PAG | Pangasinan | N/A (Provincial team) | yellow | Alexies Gonzales and Melanie Ramos |
| PET-A | Petron XCS | Petron Corporation | | Bernadeth Pons and Floremel Rodriguez |
| PET-B | Petron Sprint 4T | Petron Corporation | | Derie Rose Virtusio and Mary Rose Jauculan |
| PLDT-A | PLDT Home Fibr Power Hitters | PLDT | | Grethcel Soltones and Shola Alvarez |
| PLDT-B | Smart GigaX | PLDT | | Jasmine Nabor and Alyssa Eroa |
| SLR-A | Sta. Lucia-Woodside | Sta. Lucia Realty and Development Corporation | | Bianca Lizares and Jennifer Cosas |
| SLR-B | Sta. Lucia-Santorini | Sta. Lucia Realty and Development Corporation | | Jackielyn Estoquia and Dhannylaine Demontaño |
| UVC-A | United Volleyball Club (Team A) | United Volleyball Club | | Sheila Pineda and Jinggay Bangad |
| UVC-B | United Volleyball Club (Team B) | United Volleyball Club | | Nieza Viray and Ella Viray |

Playoffs:

Quarter-finals
B1 | Sta. Lucia-Santorini | 21 | 15 | 15
C2 | United VC "A" | 18 | 21 | 8
D1 | F2 Logistics | 11 | 20
B2 | Petron 4T | 21 | 22
A1 | Petron XCS | 21 | 21
D2 | Cignal "A" | 8 | 12
C1 | Generika-Ayala "A" | 23 | 21
A2 | Sta. Lucia-Woodside | 21 | 15

Semi-finals
B1 | Sta. Lucia-Santorini | 21 | 21
B2 | Petron 4T | 13 | 10
A1 | Petron XCS | 21 | 21
A2 | Sta. Lucia-Woodside | 14 | 14

Final
B1 | Sta. Lucia-Santorini | 10 | 14
A1 | Petron XCS | 21 | 21
Bronze medal match
B2 | Petron 4T | 16 | 21 | 15
A2 | Sta. Lucia-Woodside | 21 | 14 | 17

Final standing:

| Rank | Team |
|---|---|
| 1st place, gold medalist(s) | Petron XCS |
| 2nd place, silver medalist(s) | Sta. Lucia-Santorini |
| 3rd place, bronze medalist(s) | Sta. Lucia-Woodside |
| 4 | Petron Sprint 4T |
| 5 | Generika-Ayala Lifesavers (Team A) |
| 6 | United VC (Team A) |
| 7 | F2 Logistics Cargo Movers |
| 8 | Cignal HD Spikers (Team A) |
| 9 | |
| 10 | |
| 11 | |
| 12 | |
| 13 | |
| 14 | |

2019 Philippine Super Liga Beach Challenge Cup
Petron XCS
3rd title (Beach)
Team Roster
Bernadeth Pons and Floremel Rodriguez

=== Men's ===
2019 PSL Beach Volleyball Challenge Cup teams (Men's Division)
| Abbr. | Team | Company | Colors | Players |
|---|---|---|---|---|
| ADM | Ateneo Blue Eagles | Ateneo de Manila University | | Luis Alonzo Ligot and Canciano Llenos |
| CIG | Cignal HD Spikers | Cignal TV, Inc. | | Edmar Bonono and Alnakran Abdilla |
| EAC | EAC Generals | Emilio Aguinaldo College | red and white | Joshua Miña and Joshua Pitogo |
| FOT | Foton Tornadoes Blue Energy | United Asia Automotive Group, Inc. | | Kris Guzman and Efraem Dimaculangan |
| PAG | Pangasinan | Province of Pangasinan | yellow | Joseph Harvey and Roniel de Guzman |
| PA | Philippine Army Troopers | Philippine Army | | Jason Lindo Uy and Philip Michael Bagalay |
| PCU | PCU Dolphins | PCU-Dasmariñas | | Jessie dela Cruz and Nastin Gwaza |
| PNP | PNP Patrollers | Philippine National Police | marron | Darryl Celeste and Johnpaul Geollegue |
| UPH | UPHS-D Altas | UPHS-D | | Gilbert Balmores and Jayjay Solamillo |
| VNS | Volleyball Never Stops | Volleyball Never Stops VC | light blue | Tony Koyfman and Jeremy Merat |

Playoffs:

Semifinals
18 May
Cignal | 2
Army | 0
18 May
EAC | 1
Foton | 2

Final
18 May
Cignal | 2
Foton | 1
3rd place match
18 May
Army | 2
Cignal | 0

Final standing:

| Rank | Team |
|---|---|
| 1st place, gold medalist(s) | Cignal HD Spikers |
| 2nd place, silver medalist(s) | Foton Tornadoes Blue Energy |
| 3rd place, bronze medalist(s) | Philippine Army Troopers |
| 4 | EAC Generals |
| 5 | |
| 6 | |
| 7 | |
| 8 | |
| 9 | |
| 10 | |

2019 Philippine Super Liga Beach Challenge Cup
Cignal HD Spikers
1st title (Beach)
Team Roster
Edmar Bonono and Alnakran Abdilla

== Brand ambassador ==
- Rachel Daquis (2018 to 2019)

== Broadcast partners ==
- 5 Plus, One Sports, ESPN5.com
