= Marinerang Pilipina Lady Skippers =

- Short name: Marinerang Pilipina
- Nickname: Lady Skippers
- Founded: 2019
- Manager: Jed Montero
- Captain: Ivy Remulla (DLSU)
- League: Philippine Super Liga (2019-2020)
- 2019 Invitational: 8th place

The Marinerang Pilipina Lady Skippers were a women's volleyball team in the Philippines. The team competed in the Philippine Super Liga (PSL) from 2019 to 2020, debuting in the 2019 All-Filipino Conference. It was affiliated with the Marinerong Pilipino Skippers men's basketball team in the PBA D-League.

Due to the COVID-19 pandemic, the 2020 season of the PSL was cancelled. Prior to the beginning of 2021 season, the team, along with two other member teams took an indefinite leave of absence from the league. The Lady Skippers were one of the PSL teams that did not make jump to the professional Premier Volleyball League (PVL).

== Final roster ==
For the 2020 PSL Grand Prix Conference:

Marinerang Pilipina Lady Skippers
Number	Player	Position	Height
1	(Croatia) Hana Čutura	Outside hitter	1.94 m (6 ft 4 in)
2	(Philippines) Souzan Raslan	Opposite hitter	1.75 m (5 ft 9 in)
3	(Philippines) Nasella Nica Guliman	Middle blocker	1.82 m (6 ft 0 in)
4	(Philippines) Jasmine Gayle Alcayde	Opposite hitter	1.78 m (5 ft 10 in)
5	(Philippines) Rhea Marist Ramirez	Setter	1.63 m (5 ft 4 in)
6	(Philippines) Juliet Catindig	Libero	1.66 m (5 ft 5 in)
7	(Philippines) Ivy Elaine Remulla (c)	Middle blocker	1.76 m (5 ft 9 in)
8	(Philippines) Coleen Laurice Bravo	Middle blocker	1.82 m (6 ft 0 in)
9	(Philippines) Chiara May Permentilla	Outside hitter	1.73 m (5 ft 8 in)
10	(Philippines) Rica Diolan	Setter	1.68 m (5 ft 6 in)
11	(Philippines) Judith Abil	Outside hitter	1.68 m (5 ft 6 in)
12	(Philippines) Geneveve Casugod	Middle blocker	1.85 m (6 ft 1 in)
16	(Philippines) Miracle Mhae Mendoza	Opposite hitter	
17	(Philippines) Dimdim Pacres	Opposite hitter	1.75 m (5 ft 9 in)
18	(Philippines) Carlota Hernandez	Libero	1.65 m (5 ft 5 in)
19	(Philippines) Aurea Francesca Racraquin	Outside hitter	1.70 m (5 ft 7 in)

== Season-by-season records ==
Season	Conference	Title	Source
2019	All-Filipino	8th place	
2019	Invitational	8th place	
2020	Grand Prix	Cancelled	

== Team captains ==
- (Philippines) Ivy Remulla (2019 - 2020)
