= Kalei Mau =

Filipino-American volleyball player

Personal information
- Full name: Tyler-Marie Kalei Mau
- Nationality: United States (until 2021); Philippines (from 2021)
- Born: March 10, 1995 (age 31)
- Home town: Kahaluu, Hawaii, U.S.
- Education: University of Minnesota; University of Arizona; Harvard Business School
- Height: 6 ft 1 in (1.85 m)
- Weight: 82 kg (181 lb)
- Spike: 289 cm (114 in)
- Block: 279 cm (110 in)

Volleyball information
- Position: Outside hitter

Career
- Years: Team
- 2016–2017: Indias de Mayagüez
- 2017–2018: Volley-Ball Nantes
- 2018–2019: United Volleyball Club
- 2019–2021: F2 Logistics Cargo Movers
- 2021: Changos de Naranjito
- 2021: Choco Mucho (AVC)

National team
- Years: Team
- 2019–present: Philippines
Medal record
Women's volleyball
Representing Philippines
ASEAN Grand Prix
Bronze medal – third place	2019 Nakhon Ratchasima	Team

Tyler-Marie Kalei Mau (born March 10, 1995) is a professional Filipino-American volleyball player. She is currently a member of the Philippines women's national team. She debuted in the Philippines with the United Volleyball Club (originally known as the COCOLIFE Asset Managers) in the Philippine Super Liga.

== Career ==
=== College ===
Mau started her college career at University of Minnesota before transferring to University of Arizona for her last 3 seasons. In 2016, she was named as part of the American Volleyball Coaches Association (AVCA) Third-Team All-American team. In 2023, she entered the Harvard Business School.

=== Club ===
Mau played for Indias de Mayagüez in Puerto Rico from 2016 to 2017 and Volley-Ball Nantes in France from 2017 to 2018. Mau returned in the United States when she dislocated her shoulder and undergone surgery. On her return to the Philippines, she suited up for the Cocolife Asset Managers (United Volleyball Club), a team in the Philippine Superliga (PSL) in 2018. She moved to the F2 Logistics Cargo Movers another PSL team in 2019.

In early 2021, Mau had a brief stint with Puerto Rico side Changos de Naranjito at the 2021 Liga de Voleibol Superior Femenino.

Mau rejoined F2 Logistics after her playing in Puerto Rico. She was expected to play in the 2021 Premier Volleyball League Open Conference but her team opted not to participate. She would later help F2 Logistics clinch the 2021 PNVF Champions League title. Then she went on to join Athletes Unlimited in the United States. Mau is set to play for a team in Athletes United in March 2022, although she remains committed to rejoin F2 Logistics once again once her stint in the US pro league is done.

=== National team ===
Mau has represented the Philippines in international volleyball, particularly at the first leg of the 2019 ASEAN Grand Prix. She took part in the national team's training camps in Thailand and Japan leading up to the 2019 Southeast Asian Games before being declared ineligible to compete in the regional games after she was found to have failed to meet a two-year residency requirement set by the International Volleyball Federation (FIVB). While she has obtained a Philippine passport in early 2019, she is still a member of USA Volleyball and had to transfer to the Larong Volleyball sa Pilipinas (now the Philippine National Volleyball Federation), the Philippines' national association and served two-year residency before being eligible to play for the national team in FIVB-sanctioned tournaments. In June 2021, Mau was allowed by the FIVB to represent the Philippines.

== Personal life ==
Mau is of Hawaiian, Filipino, Irish, and Chinese descent.

== Clubs ==
- (Puerto Rico) Indias de Mayagüez (2016–2017)
- (France) Volley-Ball Nantes (2017–2018)
- (Philippines) Cocolife Asset Managers / United Volleyball Club (2018–2019)
- (Philippines) F2 Logistics Cargo Movers (2019–2021)
- (Puerto Rico) Changos de Naranjito (2021)
- (Philippines) Choco Mucho (2021) (Note: National team as club; not to be confused with Choco Mucho Flying Titans)

== Awards ==
- 2019 PSL All-Filipino Conference "Best scorer"
- 2019 PSL All-Filipino Conference "Most valuable player"

=== Club ===
- 2017 Puerto Rico - Liga de Voleibol Superior Femenino - Bronze medal, with Indias de Mayagüez
- (Philippines) 2019 PSL All-Filipino Conference - Champion, with F2 Logistics Cargo Movers
- (Philippines) 2019 PSL Invitational Cup - Champion, with F2 Logistics Cargo Movers
