= Rachel Daquis =

Filipina volleyball player (born 1987)

Personal information
- Full name: Rachel Anne Lopez Daquis
- Nationality: Filipino
- Born: December 13, 1987 (age 38); San Juan, Metro Manila
- Hometown: Taytay, Rizal, Philippines
- Height: 1.78 m (5 ft 10 in)
- Weight: 58 kg (128 lb)
- Spike: 277 cm (109 in)
- Block: 268 cm (106 in)
- Education: Far Eastern University

Volleyball information
- Position: Outside hitter/open hitter
- Current club: Zus Coffee Thunderbelles
- Number: –

Career
Years	Teams
2004–2009	FEU Lady Tamaraws
2011–2016	Philippine Army Lady Troopers
2013	TMS–Philippine Army Lady Troopers
2015	Generika Lifesavers
2016	Petron Blaze Spikers
2016	RC Cola–Army Troopers
2017–2023	Cignal HD Spikers
2024–2025	Farm Fresh Foxies
2026–present	Zus Coffee Thunderbelles

National team
2015–2017	Philippines
- Last updated: October 2016

Rachel Anne Lopez Daquis (born December 13, 1987) is a Filipina professional volleyball player for the Zus Coffee Thunderbelles of the Premier Volleyball League (PVL).

She graduated from the Far Eastern University where she took up Business Management. She was also the team captain of the PLDT HOME TVolution women's team that played in the 2014 Asian Women's Club Volleyball Championship. She is a former team captain of the FEU Lady Tamaraws in her collegiate years, where she was given the title "Queen Tamaraw". She played in the Philippine Super Liga (PSL) with the Cignal HD Spikers and is the PSL's brand ambassador for 2018 to 2019. In 2021, Cignal transferred to the Premier Volleyball League.

== Career ==
Daquis entered the volleyball scene when she was still in high school in Juan Sumulong Memorial Junior College in Rizal. She joined the FEU Lady Tamaraws and achieved her first championship during the 2008 UAAP Volleyball championships. She also played as guest player for Ateneo Lady Eagles and led the team to first runner up during the 10th season of the Shakey's V-League. Playing with Philippine Army from the Shakey's V-League Season 10 Open Conference, she won the SOS Clear Skin In & Out of the Court award. In the 11th season of the Shakey's V-League, Daquis led the team to the championship. In the Philippine Super Liga 2013 Grand Prix Conference, she won the PSL Face Off while playing for TMS-Philippine Army. On May 1, 2015 in Boracay, Daquis played with Cha Cruz, Michele Gumabao, and Gretchen Ho, winning the Nestea Beach Volleyball.

In June 2015, she was one of the athletes who participated in the 2015 Southeast Asian Games in Singapore. During that time she was featured in newspapers in Singapore. On June 30, 2015, Daquis was chosen to be part of PSL Manila which would participate in the FIVB World Club Women's Championship happening on October 18–23, 2016 in Manila. She played for Ateneo Lady Eagles in 2013. She also played as Guest Player for FEU Lady Tamaraws in the Shakey's V-League in 2014. While playing for Generika-Army, she won the PSL Face Off of the Philippine Super Liga All Filipino Conference 2014.

In 2017, Daquis joined the Cignal HD Spikers. In 2021, her team transferred from Philippine Super Liga to the Premier Volleyball League.

After a year-long hiatus, Daquis joined the Farm Fresh Foxies in October 2024. She became a free agent sometime in 2025 after her contract expired.

In January 2026, Daquis joined Farm Fresh's sister team, the Zus Coffee Thunderbelles.

== Other work ==
Aside from volleyball, Daquis has also worked as a model and finished culinary art studies. In 2014, she appeared on FHM Philippines as its cover girl for the October issue, and was named the 8th sexiest woman in the Philippines. On October 16, 2015, Daquis was selected by the San Miguel Beermen of the PBA as the team muse, along with her teammate Alexa Micek for the 2016 PBA opening ceremony. On January 21, 2016, Daquis was announced as an endorser of Snow Caps and mySlim. In 2016, Daquis reappeared on the cover of FHM Philippines for its June issue. In October 2018, she started her own business, the RAD Fitness Philippines which now has five branches. In January 2024, Daquis opened the Forn de Manila, the first Filipino bakery in Barcelona, Spain.

== Clubs ==
- (Philippines) FEU Lady Tamaraws (2004–2009)
- (Philippines) Philippine Army Lady Troopers (2011–2016)
- (Philippines) TMS–Philippine Army Lady Troopers (2013)
- (Philippines) Ateneo Lady Eagles (2013)
- (Philippines) Generika-Army Lady Troopers (2014)
- (Philippines) FEU Lady Tamaraws (2014)
- (Philippines) PLDT HOME TVolution (2014)
- (Philippines) Petron Blaze Spikers (2015)
- (Philippines) RC Cola-Army Troopers (2016)
- (Philippines) PSL–Rebisco (2017)
- (Philippines) Cignal HD Spikers (2017–2023)
- (Philippines) Farm Fresh Foxies (2024–2025)
- (Philippines) Zus Coffee Thunderbelles (2026–present)

== Individual awards ==
- UAAP Season 67 "Best blocker & Co-Rookie of the year"
- UAAP Season 68 "Best server"
- UAAP Season 69 "Best server"
- FEU Home & Away Invitational "Best blocker"
- Shakey's V-League Season 7 Open Conference "Best server"
- Shakey's V-League Season 8 Open Conference "Finals Most Valuable Player"
- Shakey's V-League Season 11 First Conference "Finals Most Valuable Player"
- Shakey's V-League Season 11 All Filipino Conference "Best server"
- Shakey's V-League Season 11 All Filipino Conference "Conference Most Valuable Player"
- 2015 Philippine Super Liga All-Filipino Conference "Finals Most Valuable Player"
- 2015 SEA GAMES (Singapore) “Darling of the crowd and Press”
- Shakey's V-League Season 12 Open Conference "2nd Best Outside Hitter"
- 2017 Philippine Super Liga Invitational Cup "2nd Best Outside Spiker"
- 2018 Philippine Super Liga Invitational Cup "1st Best Outside Spiker"
- 2018 Philippine Super Liga All-Filipino Conference "1st Best Outside Spiker"
- 2019 Philippine Super Liga All-Filipino Conference "1st Best Outside Spiker"

== Club awards ==
(Philippines) FEU Lady Tamaraws (2004–2009)

- 2007 UAAP Season 69 volleyball tournaments : Silver medal, with FEU Lady Tamaraws
- 2008 UAAP Season 70 volleyball tournaments : Champions, with FEU Lady Tamaraws
- 2008 UAAP Season 71 volleyball tournaments : Silver medal, with FEU Lady Tamaraws

(Philippines) Philippine Army Lady Troopers (2011–2016)

- 2011 Shakey's V League Open Conference : Champions
- 2011 SVL SEA Club Invitational Conference : Silver medal
- 2012 Shakey's V League Open Conference : Bronze medal
- 2013 Shakey's V League Open Conference : Bronze medal
- 2014 Shakey's V League Open Conference : Champions
- 2014 Shakey's V League Reinforced Conference : Silver medal
- 2015 Shakey's V League Open Conference : Silver medal
- 2015 Shakey's V League Reinforced Conference : Silver medal

(Philippines) TMS–Philippine Army Lady Troopers (2013)

- 2015 Philippine Super Liga Invitational Conference : Champions
- 2015 Philippine Super Liga Grand Prix Conference : Champions

(Philippines) Ateneo Lady Eagles (2013)

- 2013 Shakey's V League 1st Conference : Silver medal, with Ateneo De Manila University Lady Eagles

(Philippines) Generika-Army Lady Troopers (2014)

- 2014 Philippine Super Liga All Filipino Conference : Champions

(Philippines) FEU Lady Tamaraws (2014–2015)

- 2014 Shakey's V League 1st Conference : Champions
- 2015 Shakey's V League Collegiate Conference : Bronze medal

(Philippines) PLDT HOME TVolution (2014)

(Philippines) Petron Blaze Spikers (2015)

- 2015 Philippine Super Liga All Filipino Conference : Champions
- 2015 Philippine Super Liga Grand Prix Conference : Silver medal

(Philippines) RC Cola-Army Troopers (2016)

- 2016 Philippine Super Liga Invitational Conference : Champions
- 2016 Philippine Super Liga All Filipino Conference : Bronze medal

(Philippines) PSL–Rebisco (2017)

(Philippines) Cignal HD Spikers (2017–2023)

- 2017 Philippine Super Liga Invitational Conference : Champions
- 2017 Philippine Super Liga All Filipino Conference : Bronze medal
- 2018 Philippine Super Liga Invitational Conference : Bronze medal
- 2019 Philippine Super Liga All Filipino Conference : Silver medal
- 2019 Philippine Super Liga Invitational Conference : Bronze medal
- 2022 Premiere Volleyball League Open Conference : Bronze medal
- 2022 Premiere Volleyball League Invitational Conference : Bronze medal
- 2022 Premiere Volleyball League Reinforced Conference : Silver medal
- 2023 Premiere Volleyball League Invitational Conference : Bronze medal
- 2023 Premiere Volleyball League 2nd All-Filipino Conference : Bronze medal
