= 2019 Philippine Super Liga All-Filipino Conference =

Second indoor conference of the 2019 Philippine Super Liga season

- Duration: June 15 – August 27, 2019
- Teams: 8
- TV partner(s): ESPN 5, 5 Plus, One Sports, ESPN Player (Online)

Results
- Champions: F2 Logistics Cargo Movers
- Runners-up: Cignal HD Spikers
- Third place: Petron Blaze Spikers
- Fourth place: Foton Tornadoes Blue Energy

Awards
- MVP: Kalei Mau
- Best OH: Rachel Daquis; Sisi Rondina
- Best MB: Jaja Santiago; Mary Joy Baron
- Best OPP: Dindin Santiago-Manabat
- Best Setter: Alohi Robins-Hardy
- Best Libero: Angelique Dionela

PSL All-Filipino Conference chronology
- < 2018

PSL conference chronology
- < 2019 Grand Prix (indoor) 2019 Invitational >
- < 2019 BVCC (beach)

The 2019 Philippine Super Liga All-Filipino Conference was the second conference of the 2019 season of the Philippine Super Liga (PSL) and the sixth running of the All-Filipino Conference. The tournament began on June 15, 2019 at Filoil Flying V Centre in San Juan, and ended on August 27.

The United Volleyball Club departed and in its place were the Marinerang Pilipina Lady Skippers.

For the first time since the 2016 Grand Prix, the finals featured a team other than perennial contenders F2 Logistics Cargo Movers and Petron Blaze Spikers. This time, it was the Cignal HD Spikers who would face F2 Logistics for the championship. F2 Logistics would beat Cignal to clinch their fourth league title.

== Teams ==
2019 Philippine Super Liga All-Filipino Conference
Abbr.	Team	Affiliation	Head coach	Team captain
CHD	Cignal HD Spikers	Cignal TV, Inc.	Edgar Barroga	Rachel Daquis
FTL	F2 Logistics Cargo Movers	F2 Global Logistics Inc.	Ramil de Jesus	Aby Maraño
FOT	Foton Tornadoes Blue Energy	United Asia Automotive Group, Inc.	Aaron Velez	Carmina Aganon
GAL	Generika–Ayala Lifesavers	Actimed, Inc.	Sherwin Meneses	Angeli Pauline Araneta
MPS	Marinerang Pilipina Lady Skippers	Marinerang Pilipina Group	Ronald Dulay	Ivy Remulla
PET	Petron Blaze Spikers	Petron Corporation	Shaq Delos Santos	Frances Molina
PHF	PLDT Home Fibr Power Hitters	PLDT	Roger Gorayeb	Jerrili Malabanan
SLR	Sta. Lucia Lady Realtors	Sta. Lucia Realty and Development Corporation	Raymund Castillo	Pamela Lastimosa

== Format ==
Preliminary round

- The preliminary round was a double round-robin tournament, with each team playing two matches against all other teams for a total of 14 matches.

Quarterfinals

- The quarterfinals featured single-elimination matches.
- The match-ups were as follows:
  - QF1: #1 vs. #8
  - QF2: #2 vs. #7
  - QF3: #3 vs. #6
  - QF4: #4 vs. #5
- The winners advanced to the semifinals while the losers were eliminated.

Semifinals

- The semifinals featured the twice-to-beat advantage. The higher-seeded team in a match-up only needed to win one out of two matches to advance while the bottom needed to win two matches back-to-back to do so.
- The match-ups were as follows:
  - SF1: QF1 winner vs. QF4 winner
  - SF2: QF2 winner vs. QF3 winner
- The winners advanced to the championship match while the losers would play in the third-place match.

Finals

- The third-place match was single-elimination while the championship was a best-of-three series.
- The match-ups were as follows:
  - Championship: Semifinal round winners
  - Third-place match: Semifinal round losers

== Preliminary round ==
Pos	Team	Pld	W	L	Pts	SW	SL	SR	SPW	SPL	SPR
1	Petron Blaze Spikers	14	13	1	34	40	13	3.077	1236	968	1.277
2	F2 Logistics Cargo Movers	14	12	2	37	40	10	4.000	1183	925	1.279
3	Foton Tornadoes Blue Energy	14	8	6	25	31	23	1.348	1202	1150	1.045
4	Generika–Ayala Lifesavers	14	8	6	23	27	26	1.038	1144	1142	1.002
5	Cignal HD Spikers	14	7	7	24	30	26	1.154	1238	1164	1.064
6	PLDT Home Fibr Power Hitters	14	6	8	17	22	31	0.710	1096	1189	0.922
7	Sta. Lucia Lady Realtors	14	2	12	8	14	36	0.389	927	1181	0.785
8	Marinerang Pilipina Lady Skippers	14	0	14	0	3	42	0.071	824	1131	0.729

Rules for classification: 3 points = win match in 3 or 4 sets; 2 points = win match in 5 sets; 1 point = lose match in 5 sets; 0 point = lose match in 3 or 4 sets

Match results

- All times are in Philippines Standard Time (UTC+08:00)

=== First round ===
Date	Time		Score		Set 1	Set 2	Set 3	Set 4	Set 5	Total	Report
15 Jun	14:00	F2 Logistics Cargo Movers	3–0	Generika–Ayala Lifesavers	25–12	25–21	25–17			75–50	P-2
15 Jun	16:00	Sta. Lucia Lady Realtors	3–0	Marinerang Pilipina Lady Skippers	25–23	25–22	25–23			75–68	P-2
18 Jun	14:00	Generika–Ayala Lifesavers	3–0	Marinerang Pilipina Lady Skippers	25–18	25–15	25–23			75–56	P-2
18 Jun	16:15	Sta. Lucia Lady Realtors	1–3	Foton Tornadoes Blue Energy	25–17	18–25	16–25	21–25		80–92	P-2
18 Jun	19:00	F2 Logistics Cargo Movers	3–0	PLDT Home Fibr Power Hitters	25–15	27–25	25–22			77–62	P-2
20 Jun	16:15	Marinerang Pilipina Lady Skippers	0–3	Petron Blaze Spikers	21–25	16–25	10–25			47–75	P-2
20 Jun	19:00	Foton Tornadoes Blue Energy	1–3	Generika–Ayala Lifesavers	25–22	24–26	19–25	17–25		85–98	P-2
22 Jun	14:00	Sta. Lucia Lady Realtors	2–3	PLDT Home Fibr Power Hitters	25–22	25–20	16–25	20–25	8–15	94–107	P-2
22 Jun	16:00	F2 Logistics Cargo Movers	3–1	Foton Tornadoes Blue Energy	25–9	23–25	25–22	25–16		98–72	P-2
25 Jun	14:00	PLDT Home Fibr Power Hitters	3–1	Marinerang Pilipina Lady Skippers	25–21	25–20	18–25	25–14		93–80	P-2
25 Jun	16:15	Sta. Lucia Lady Realtors	1–3	Cignal HD Spikers	27–25	22–25	10–25	21–25		80–100	P-2
25 Jun	19:00	Petron Blaze Spikers	3–2	Foton Tornadoes Blue Energy	22–25	16–25	25–16	25–17	15–12	103–95	P-2
27 Jun	16:15	PLDT Home Fibr Power Hitters	0–3	Cignal HD Spikers	12–25	21–25	15–25			48–75	P-2
27 Jun	19:00	Petron Blaze Spikers	1–3	F2 Logistics Cargo Movers	21–25	25–17	25–27	19–25		90–94	P-2
29 Jun	14:30	Cignal HD Spikers	2–3	Petron Blaze Spikers	20–25	25–18	16–25	25–16	14–16	100–100	P-2
29 Jun	16:30	Foton Tornadoes Blue Energy	3–1	PLDT Home Fibr Power Hitters	21–25	25–18	25–19	25–15		96–77	P-2
02 Jul	16:15	Sta. Lucia Lady Realtors	0–3	Generika–Ayala Lifesavers	12–25	23–25	26–28			61–78	P-2
02 Jul	19:00	Cignal HD Spikers	0–3	F2 Logistics Cargo Movers	22–25	19–25	14–25			55–75	P-2
04 Jul	16:15	Sta. Lucia Lady Realtors	0–3	F2 Logistics Cargo Movers	15–25	14–25	21–25			50–75	P-2
04 Jul	19:00	Generika–Ayala Lifesavers	3–2	Cignal HD Spikers	25–23	25–20	20–25	22–25	15–12	107–105	P-2
06 Jul	16:15	Petron Blaze Spikers	3–0	PLDT Home Fibr Power Hitters	25–16	29–27	25–22			79–65	P-2
06 Jul	18:00	Marinerang Pilipina Lady Skippers	0–3	Foton Tornadoes Blue Energy	25–27	15–25	20–25			60–77	P-2
09 Jul	16:15	Generika–Ayala Lifesavers	0–3	Petron Blaze Spikers	18–25	12–25	16–25			46–75	P-2
09 Jul	19:00	Foton Tornadoes Blue Energy	3–1	Cignal HD Spikers	25–27	25–23	25–20	25–19		100–89	P-2
11 Jul	16:15	Marinerang Pilipina Lady Skippers	0–3	F2 Logistics Cargo Movers	7–25	9–25	19–25			35–75	P-2
11 Jul	19:00	Generika–Ayala Lifesavers	3–1	PLDT Home Fibr Power Hitters	27–25	16–25	25–18	25–14		93–82	P-2
13 Jul	16:00	Marinerang Pilipina Lady Skippers	0–3	Cignal HD Spikers	14–25	22–25	25–27			61–77	P-2
13 Jul	18:00	Sta. Lucia Lady Realtors	0–3	Petron Blaze Spikers	12–25	16–25	17–25			45–75	P-2

Match results

- All times are in Philippines Standard Time (UTC+08:00)

=== Second round ===
Date	Time		Score		Set 1	Set 2	Set 3	Set 4	Set 5	Total	Report
16 Jul	16:00	Foton Tornadoes Blue Energy	3–2	Sta. Lucia Lady Realtors	18–25	21–25	25–18	25–15	15–4	104–87	P-2
16 Jul	18:00	Petron Blaze Spikers	3–0	Generika–Ayala Lifesavers	26–24	25–12	25–19			76–55	P-2
18 Jul	14:00	F2 Logistics Cargo Movers	3–0	Sta. Lucia Lady Realtors	25–22	25–3	25–12			75–37	P-2
18 Jul	16:15	Petron Blaze Spikers	3–2	Cignal HD Spikers	17–25	21–25	25–11	25–17	15–10	103–88	P-2
18 Jul	19:00	PLDT Home Fibr Power Hitters	0–3	Foton Tornadoes Blue Energy	21–25	21–25	15–25			57–75	P-2
20 Jul	16:00	Cignal HD Spikers	3–0	Sta. Lucia Lady Realtors	25–8	25–16	25–22			75–46	P-2
20 Jul	18:00	Generika–Ayala Lifesavers	0–3	Foton Tornadoes Blue Energy	16–25	26–28	15–25			57–78	P-2
23 Jul	16:15	PLDT Home Fibr Power Hitters	3–1	Sta. Lucia Lady Realtors	20–25	25–22	27–25	25–18		97–90	P-2
23 Jul	19:00	Marinerang Pilipina Lady Skippers	1–3	Generika–Ayala Lifesavers	25–23	18–25	12–25	20–25		75–98	P-2
25 Jul	14:30	Marinerang Pilipina Lady Skippers	0–3	Sta. Lucia Lady Realtors	17–25	19–25	29–31			65–81	P-2
25 Jul	16:15	PLDT Home Fibr Power Hitters	0–3	Petron Blaze Spikers	19–25	15–25	9–25			43–75	P-2
25 Jul	19:00	Foton Tornadoes Blue Energy	0–3	F2 Logistics Cargo Movers	17–25	12–25	23–25			52–75	P-2
27 Jul	16:00	Generika–Ayala Lifesavers	2–3	F2 Logistics Cargo Movers	19–25	27–25	22–25	25–18	13–15	106–108	P-2
27 Jul	18:30	Cignal HD Spikers	3–1	Marinerang Pilipina Lady Skippers	25–20	25–15	24–26	27–25		101–86	P-2
30 Jul	16:15	Petron Blaze Spikers	3–0	Sta. Lucia Lady Realtors	25–13	25–10	25–13			75–36	P-2
30 Jul	19:00	F2 Logistics Cargo Movers	3–0	Marinerang Pilipina Lady Skippers	25–16	25–13	25–9			75–38	P-2
01 Aug	16:15	Cignal HD Spikers	3–1	Foton Tornadoes Blue Energy	25–23	21–25	25–14	25–21		96–83	P-2
01 Aug	19:00	Generika–Ayala Lifesavers	3–1	Sta. Lucia Lady Realtors	25–17	20–25	25–14	25–9		95–65	P-2
03 Aug	16:00	Marinerang Pilipina Lady Skippers	0–3	PLDT Home Fibr Power Hitters	16–25	23–25	20–25			59–75	P-2
03 Aug	18:00	Cignal HD Spikers	2–3	Generika–Ayala Lifesavers	24–26	25–19	24–26	25–18	14–16	112–105	P-2
06 Aug	16:15	Petron Blaze Spikers	3–0	Marinerang Pilipina Lady Skippers	25–12	25–17	25–9			75–38	P-2
06 Aug	19:00	Cignal HD Spikers	3–2	PLDT Home Fibr Power Hitters	23–25	25–20	25–16	23–25	15–9	111–95	P-2
08 Aug	16:15	F2 Logistics Cargo Movers	2–3	Petron Blaze Spikers	28–26	29–27	19–25	20–25	6–15	102–118	P-2
08 Aug	19:00	Generika–Ayala Lifesavers	1–3	PLDT Home Fibr Power Hitters	23–25	25–14	15–25	18–25		81–89	P-2
10 Aug	16:00	PLDT Home Fibr Power Hitters	3–2	F2 Logistics Cargo Movers	25–21	26–28	15–25	25–19	15–11	106–104	P-2
10 Aug	18:00	Foton Tornadoes Blue Energy	2–3	Petron Blaze Spikers	23–25	26–24	26–24	22–25	17–19	114–117	P-2
13 Aug	16:15	Foton Tornadoes Blue Energy	3–0	Marinerang Pilipina Lady Skippers	25–15	29–27	25–14			79–56	P-2
13 Aug	19:00	F2 Logistics Cargo Movers	3–0	Cignal HD Spikers	25–18	25–14	25–22			75–54	P-2

== Playoffs ==
Quarter-finals; One-game playoff
Petron Blaze Spikers	3
Marinerang Pilipina Lady Skippers	0
Generika–Ayala Lifesavers	1
Cignal HD Spikers	3
F2 Logistics Cargo Movers	3
Santa Lucia Lady Realtors	0
Foton Tornadoes Blue Energy	3
PLDT Home Fibr Power Hitters	1

Semi-finals; Twice-to-beat higher seed
Petron Blaze Spikers	2, 2
Cignal HD Spikers	3, 3
F2 Logistics Cargo Movers	3
Foton Tornadoes Blue Energy	1

Finals; Best-of-three series
Cignal HD Spikers	2, 0
F2 Logistics Cargo Movers	3, 3
Bronze-medal match
Petron Blaze Spikers	3
Foton Tornadoes Blue Energy	2

=== Quarterfinals ===
Date	Time		Score		Set 1	Set 2	Set 3	Set 4	Set 5	Total	Report
15 Aug	16:15	Petron Blaze Spikers	3–0	Marinerang Pilipina Lady Skippers	25–18	25–13	25–11			75–42	P-2
15 Aug	19:00	Foton Tornadoes Blue Energy	3–1	PLDT Home Fibr Power Hitters	16–25	25–17	25–17	25–12		91–71	P-2
17 Aug	16:00	Generika–Ayala Lifesavers	1–3	Cignal HD Spikers	15–25	25–17	18–25	22–25		80–92	P-2
17 Aug	18:00	F2 Logistics Cargo Movers	3–0	Sta. Lucia Lady Realtors	25–10	25–14	25–17			75–41	P-2

=== Semifinals ===
Date	Time		Score		Set 1	Set 2	Set 3	Set 4	Set 5	Total	Report
20 Aug	16:15	F2 Logistics Cargo Movers	3–1	Foton Tornadoes Blue Energy	25–19	25–23	17–25	25–19		92–86	
20 Aug	19:00	Petron Blaze Spikers	2–3	Cignal HD Spikers	20–25	25–10	25–16	25–27	11–15	106–93	
22 Aug	16:15	Cignal HD Spikers	3–2	Petron Blaze Spikers	30–28	25–21	17–25	23–25	15–8	110–107	

=== Bronze match ===
Date	Time		Score		Set 1	Set 2	Set 3	Set 4	Set 5	Total	Report
24 Aug	16:00	Foton Tornadoes Blue Energy	2–3	Petron Blaze Spikers	26–28	27–25	21–25	26–24	12–15	112–117	

=== Finals ===
Best-of-three series

Date	Time		Score		Set 1	Set 2	Set 3	Set 4	Set 5	Total	Report
24 Aug	18:00	F2 Logistics Cargo Movers	3–2	Cignal HD Spikers	25–22	26–24	18–25	17–25	15–8	101–104	
27 Aug	19:00	Cignal HD Spikers	0–3	F2 Logistics Cargo Movers	14–25	16–25	19–25			49–75	

== Final standing ==
Rank	Team
1st place, gold medalist(s)	F2 Logistics Cargo Movers
2nd place, silver medalist(s)	Cignal HD Spikers
3rd place, bronze medalist(s)	Petron Blaze Spikers
4	Foton Tornadoes Blue Energy
5	Generika–Ayala Lifesavers
6	PLDT Home Fibr Power Hitters
7	Sta. Lucia Lady Realtors
8	Marinerang Pilipina Lady Skippers

2019 All Filipino Conference Champions
F2 Logistics Cargo Movers
Team roster
Abigail Maraño (c). Dawn Macandili (libero), Tyler-Marie Kalei Mau, Maria Lourdes Clemente, Alexine Danielle Cabanos, Victonara Galang, Kim Fajardo, Mary Joy Baron, Kim Kianna Dy, Carmel June Saga, Aduke Christine Ogunsanya, Michelle Katherine Morente, Ernestine Tiamzon, Michelle Cobb, Desiree Cheng, Ramil de Jesús (head coach)

== Special awards ==
- Glorious Blend Mix Volleyball Jam - Sisi Rondina (Petron Blaze Spikers)
- Ms. Sweet and Fit Stevia - Mika Reyes (Petron Blaze Spikers)
- Ms. Glorious Blend Coffee - Jovelyn Gonzaga (Cignal HD Spikers)

== Individual awards ==
Award		Name/Team
MVP		(United States) Tyler-Marie Kalei Mau (F2 Logistics Cargo Movers)
Best Outside Spiker	1st:	(Philippines) Rachel Daquis (Cignal HD Spikers)
Best Outside Spiker	2nd:	(Philippines) Sisi Rondina (Petron Blaze Spikers)
Best Middle Blocker	1st:	(Philippines) Jaja Santiago (Foton Tornadoes Blue Energy)
Best Middle Blocker	2nd:	(Philippines) Mary Joy Baron (F2 Logistics Cargo Movers)
Best Opposite Spiker		(Philippines) Dindin Santiago-Manabat (Foton Tornadoes Blue Energy)
Best Setter		(United States) Alohi Robins-Hardy (Cignal HD Spikers)
Best Libero		(Philippines) Angelique Beatrice Dionela (Cignal HD Spikers)
Best Scorer		(United States) Tyler-Marie Kalei Mau (F2 Logistics Cargo Movers)

== Venues ==
- Filoil Flying V Centre (main venue)
- Smart Araneta Coliseum (finals)
- Mall of Asia Arena (finals)

"Spike on Tour" venues

- Muntinlupa Sports Complex - Muntinlupa
- Strike Gymnasium - Bacoor City
- Cadiz Arena - Cadiz City
- Natalio G. Velez Sports & Cultural Center - Silay City
- Ynares Center - Antipolo
- Caloocan Sports Complex - Caloocan
- Quezon Convention Center - Lucena City
- Malolos Sports & Convention Center - Malolos City
- Imus Sports Center
- Corpus Christi Gymnasium - Cagayan de Oro City

== Broadcast partners ==
- ESPN 5: 5 Plus, One Sports (SD and HD), ESPN5.com, ESPN Player (Online)
