= Aby Maraño =

Filipino volleyball player

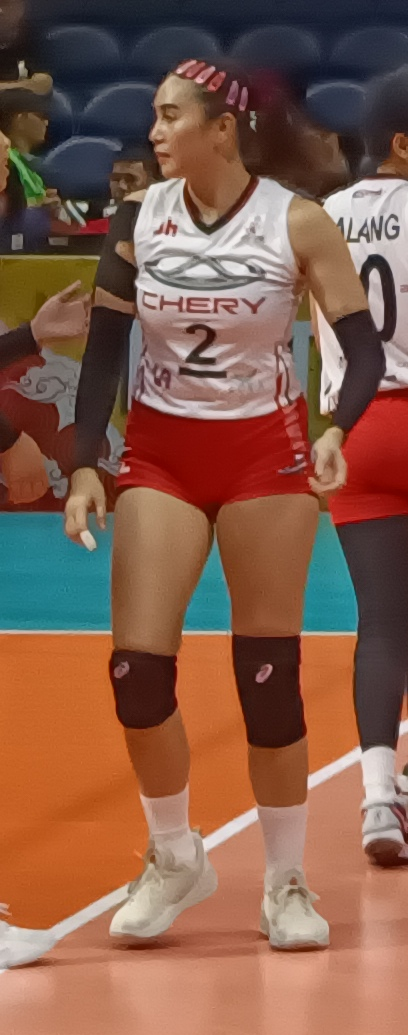
- Maraño in 2025

Personal information
- Full name: Abigail Palmares Maraño
- Born: December 22, 1992 (age 33); Quezon City, Philippines
- Hometown: Passi, Iloilo
- Height: 173 cm (5 ft 8 in)
- Weight: 54 kg (119 lb)
- Spike: 280 cm (110 in)
- Block: 270 cm (106 in)
- Education: De La Salle University

Volleyball information
- Position: Middle blocker / libero

Career
Years	Teams
2014	AirAsia Flying Spikers
2014	PLDT Home Telpad Turbo Boosters
2014–2015	Meralco Power Spikers
2014	Generika Lifesavers
2015	Petron Blaze Spikers
2015	Philippine Army Lady Troopers
2016	Foton Tornadoes
2016–2023	F2 Logistics Cargo Movers
2021	Rebisco Philippines
2024–2025	Chery Tiggo Crossovers
2026	Nxled Chameleons

National team
2015–2023	Philippines
Honours
Women's volleyball
Representing Philippines
ASEAN Grand Prix
Bronze medal – third place	2019 Nakhon Ratchasima	Leg 1
Bronze medal – third place	2019 Santa Rosa	Leg 2

Abigail "Aby" Palmares Maraño (born December 22, 1992) is a Filipino former professional volleyball player.

Maraño spent her entire college career with De La Salle University's Lady Spikers, where she helped lead the team to three UAAP championships in five finals appearances, earning her Most Valuable Player twice.

At the club level, she became one of the best middle blockers in the country during the mid- to late-2010s, earning eight Best Middle Blocker awards in the Philippine Super Liga. Having played for numerous clubs, she was mostly known for her time as a key player for the F2 Logistics Cargo Movers, where she won five of her six league titles as well as a PNVF Champions League title. She also played for the Philippines national team from 2015 to 2023. In September 2026, Maraño announced her retirement from volleyball.

== Early life and education ==
Maraño was born on December 22, 1992 in Quezon City, Philippines. However she has roots to the town of Passi in Iloilo. She took up Bachelor of Arts in Philippine Studies major in Filipino in Mass Media at De La Salle University.

== Career ==
=== College ===
Aby Maraño was a two-time UAAP Most Valuable Player, having won the award in the UAAP Season 74 and Season 75 and former team captain (2012–14) of the De La Salle Lady Spikers.

=== Philippine Super Liga ===
Maraño began her commercial league career in the PSL, where she was selected as the second overall draft pick for the 2014 season for the AirAsia Flying Spikers. She played with Don Antonio de Zuzuarregui Sr Memorial Academy and De La Salle University Lady Spikers from (2009-2014). In 2014 she was the top drafted by AirAsia Flying Spikers from the Philippine Super Liga. Shen then played with the Shakey's V-League club Meralco Power Spikers. She played in the 2015 Philippine Super Liga season with Petron Blaze Spikers. In 2016 she played with Foton Tornadoes as a guest player during the 2016 Asian Club Championship.

With F2 Logistics Cargo Movers, Maraño won the 2017 PSL Grand Prix Conference championship.

=== Premier Volleyball League ===
She followed the F2 Logistics Cargo Movers when the team moved from the PSL to the Premier Volleyball League in 2021.

After F2 Logistics was disbanded, Maraño joined the Chery Tiggo Crossovers in 2024. After Cherry Tiggo also disbanded, Maraño joined the Nxled Chameleons in 2026.

On September 16, 2026, Maraño announced her full retirement from volleyball after 22 years, following the conclusion of the 2026 Premier Volleyball League Invitational Conference.

=== National team ===
Aby Maraño had played for the Philippines national team. She debuted at the 2015 SEA Games in Singapore. She subsequently appeared in the 2017, 2019, and 2021 editions. She was captain in the 2018 Asian Games in Jakarta.

She helped the Philippines finished third in both two legs of the 2019 ASEAN Grand Prix.

She retired from national duties in March 2023 to focus on her club.

== Personal life ==
Maraño was previously in a relationship with Philippine Basketball Association player Robert Bolick from 2013 to 2021. In March 2026, she and former Nxled Chameleons volleyball player Kamille Cal ended their relationship after 3 years of dating. Maraño has psoriasis.

== Clubs ==
- (Philippines) AirAsia Flying Spikers (2014)
- (Philippines) PLDT Home Telpad Turbo Boosters (women) (2014)
- (Philippines) Meralco Power Spikers (2014–2015)
- (Philippines) Generika Lifesavers (2014)
- (Philippines) Petron Blaze Spikers (2015)
- (Philippines) Philippine Army Lady Troopers (2015)
- (Philippines) Foton Tornadoes (2016)
- (Philippines) F2 Logistics Cargo Movers (2016–2023)
- (Philippines) Chery Tiggo Crossovers (2024–2025)
- (Philippines) Nxled Chameleons (2026)

== Awards ==
=== Individuals ===
- UAAP Season 74 "Most Valuable Player"
- UAAP Season 75 "Most Valuable Player"
- UAAP Season 75 "Best Blocker"
- Shakey's V-League 11th Season Reinforced Open Conference "Best Blocker"
- 2014 Philippine Super Liga All-Filipino "1st Best Middle Blocker"
- 2014 Philippine Super Liga Grand Prix "1st Best Middle Blocker"
- 2015 Philippine Super Liga All-Filipino "2nd Best Middle Blocker"
- 2016 Philippine Super Liga Invitational "1st Best Middle Blocker"
- 2016 Philippine Super Liga All-Filipino "1st Best Middle Blocker"
- 2016 Philippine Super Liga Grand Prix "1st Best Middle Blocker"
- 2018 Philippine Super Liga Grand Prix "1st Best Middle Blocker"
- 2019 Philippine Super Liga Grand Prix "Best Middle Blocker (Local)"
- 2021 PNVF Champions League for Women "1st Best Middle Blocker"
- 2024 PNVF Champions League for Women "1st Best Middle Blocker"

=== Others ===
- 2014 PSA Ms. Volleyball
- 2017 DLSAA Lasallian Sports Achievement Award
- 2017 Philippine Superliga Ambassadress

=== Collegiate ===
- 2010 UAAP Season 72 volleyball tournaments - Silver medal, with De La Salle Lady Spikers
- 2011 UAAP Season 73 volleyball tournaments - Champion, with De La Salle Lady Spikers
- 2012 UAAP Season 74 volleyball tournaments - Champion, with De La Salle Lady Spikers
- 2013 UAAP Season 75 volleyball tournaments - Champion, with De La Salle Lady Spikers
- 2014 UAAP Season 76 volleyball tournaments - Silver medal, with De La Salle Lady Spikers

=== Clubs ===
- 2014 PSL All-Filipino Conference - 4th placer, with AirAsia Flying Spikers
- 2014 PSL Grand Prix Conference - Silver medal, with Generika Lifesavers
- 2014 Shakey's V-League 11th Season Reinforced Open Conference - 4th placer, with Meralco Power Spikers
- 2015 Shakey's V-League 12th Season Open Conference - 4th placer, with Meralco Power Spikers
- 2015 Shakey's V-League 12th Season Reinforced Open Conference - Silver medal, with Philippine Army Lady Troopers
- 2015 PSL All-Filipino Conference – Champion, with Petron Blaze Spikers
- 2015 PSL Grand Prix Conference - Silver medal, with Petron Blaze Spikers
- 2016 PSL Invitational Cup - Bronze medal, with F2 Logistics Cargo Movers
- 2016 PSL All-Filipino Conference – Champion, with F2 Logistics Cargo Movers
- 2016 PSL Grand Prix Conference - Bronze medal, with F2 Logistics Cargo Movers
- 2017 PSL All-Filipino Conference - Silver medal, with F2 Logistics Cargo Movers
- 2017 Sealect Tuna Volleyball Cup - Bronze medal, with PSL All-Stars
- 2017 PSL Grand Prix Conference - Champion, with F2 Logistics Cargo Movers
- 2018 PSL Grand Prix Conference - Silver medal, with F2 Logistics Cargo Movers
- 2018 PSL Invitational Cup - Champion, with F2 Logistics Cargo Movers
- 2018 PSL All-Filipino Conference - Silver medal, with F2 Logistics Cargo Movers
- 2019 PSL Grand Prix Conference - Silver medal, with F2 Logistics Cargo Movers
- 2019 PSL All-Filipino Conference – Champion, with F2 Logistics Cargo Movers
- 2019 PSL Invitational Conference - Champion, with F2 Logistics Cargo Movers
- 2021 PNVF Champions League for Women - Champion, with F2 Logistics Cargo Movers
- 2023 Premier Volleyball League First All-Filipino Conference - Bronze medal, with F2 Logistics Cargo Movers
- 2024 PNVF Champions League for Women - Bronze medal, with Chery Tiggo Crossovers
- 2025 Premier Volleyball League on Tour - Silver medal, with Chery Tiggo Crossovers
