= Amanda Villanueva =

Filipino volleyball athlete

Personal information
- Nationality: Filipino
- Born: 1991 or 1992 (age 34–35); San Diego, California, U.S.
- Height: 5 ft 4 in (1.63 m)
- Education: De La Salle University; Adamson University

Volleyball information
- Position: Opposite Hitter

Career
Years	Teams
2015	PLDT
2017–2018	Perlas Spikers
2019	Sta. Lucia Lady Realtors

Amanda Maria Villanueva (born 1991 or 1992) is a Filipino volleyball athlete. She played for the Adamson Lady Falcons in the University Athletic Association of the Philippines before turning pro in the Premier Volleyball League and Philippine Superliga. She is also a model and marketing executive.

== Career ==
An opposite hitter, Villanueva played high school volleyball at St. James Academy in Malabon and represented the National Capital Region at Palarong Pambansa. In college, she initially played for the DLSU Lady Spikers and later played four years for the Adamson Lady Falcons. She had two UAAP Final Four appearances in indoor volleyball and won a beach volley crown for Adamson University while teaming up with Bang Pineda and Jema Galanza in 2013. She briefly played for the PLDT Home Ultera Ultra Fast Hitters in the Shakey's V-League in 2015. They would later meet at the pro ranks in separate teams.

Villanueva joined the Perlas Spikers of the Premier Volleyball League in 2017. She helped the team win double bronze in 2018. She moved to the Sta. Lucia Lady Realtors of the Philippine Super Liga in 2019.

She ended her competitive volleyball career in 2020, at age 28.

== Personal life ==
Villanueva became engaged to her boyfriend Rico Robles during their vacation in Taipei, Taiwan in 2020 after two years of being in a romantic relationship. Villanueva also engages in business and modeling careers.
