= Sta. Lucia Lady Realtors =

Professional volleyball club

- Short name: Sta. Lucia
- Nickname: Lady Realtors
- Founded: 2017
- Dissolved: 2021
- League: Philippine Super Liga (2017–2021); Premier Volleyball League (2021)

Uniforms
| Home | Away |

The Sta. Lucia Lady Realtors were a professional women's volleyball club in the Premier Volleyball League. The team is owned by Sta. Lucia Realty and Development Corporation.

== History ==
The team was formed in 2017 playing in the Philippine Super Liga (PSL). This marked the return of the company, Sta. Lucia Realty and Development Corporation, to Philippine major league sports. The company's previous foray in major league sports was the original Sta. Lucia Realtors professional basketball team, which played in the Philippine Basketball Association from 1993 to 2010.

In 2021, the Lady Realtors turned professional with its transfer to the Premier Volleyball League (PVL) and were able to compete in one conference.

In December 2021, the team took a leave of absence from the PVL and released its coach and all its players due to "uncertainties" of the ongoing COVID-19 pandemic. Consequentially, the team will not be taking part in the 2022 season. It hoped to reactivate in 2023 when the situation improves, but those plans did not materialize.

== Honors ==
=== Team ===
Premier Volleyball League:

| Season | Conference | Title | Source |
|---|---|---|---|
| 2021 | Open | 5th place | |

Philippine Superliga:

| Season | Conference | Title | Source |
|---|---|---|---|
| 2017 | Invitational | 6th place | |
| 2017 | All-Filipino | 6th place | |
| 2017 | Grand Prix | 6th place | |
| 2018 | Grand Prix | 5th place | |
| 2018 | Invitational | 6th place | |
| 2018 | All-Filipino | 8th place | |
| 2019 | Grand Prix | 8th place | |
| 2019 | All-Filipino | 7th place | |
| 2019 | Invitational | 6th place | |
| 2020 | Grand Prix | Cancelled | |

== Team captains ==
- (Philippines) Djanel Cheng (2017)
- (Philippines) Pamela Lastimosa (2018–2019)
- (Philippines) Amanda Villanueva (2019)
- (Canada) Shainah Joseph (2020)
- (Philippines) Rubie De Leon (2021)

== Coaches ==
- Michael Cariño (2017 Invitational)
- Sammy Acaylar (2017 All-Filipino)
- Jerry Yee (2017 Grand Prix)
- George Pascua (2018)
- Babes Castillo (2019)
- Eddieson Orcullo (2020–2021)
- Edgar Barroga (2021)

== Notable players ==
=== Local players ===
Local players

- Djanel Cheng
- Aiza Maizo-Pontillas
- Bang Pineda
- Mika Reyes
- MJ Phillips
- Jovie Prado
- Amanda Villanueva

=== Imports ===
Philippine Super Liga

| Season | Player | Country |
|---|---|---|
| 2016 | Amy Ahomiro | New Zealand |
| 2017 / 2018 | Marisa Field | Canada |
| 2017 / 2018 | Bohdana Anisova | Ukraine |
| 2017 / 2018 | Kristen Moncks | Canada |
| 2019 | Casey Schoenlein | United States |
| 2019 | Molly Lohman | United States |
| 2020 | Shainah Joseph | Canada |

== See also ==
- Sta. Lucia Realtors (PBA basketball team)
- Sta. Lucia Realtors (PCBL basketball team)
