= Majoy Baron =

Filipino volleyball player (born 1995)

Personal information
- Full name: Mary Joy Dela Cruz Baron
- Nicknames: Majoy, MJB
- Nationality: Filipino
- Born: December 10, 1995 (age 30)
- Home town: Concepcion, Tarlac, Philippines
- Education: De La Salle University
- Height: 6 ft 0 in (1.83 m)
- Weight: 59 kg (130 lb)
- Spike: 287 cm (113 in)
- Block: 272 cm (107 in)

Volleyball information
- Position: Middle Hitter/Middle Blocker
- Current club: PLDT
- Number: 10

Career
- Years: Team
- 2015: Meralco Power Spikers
- 2016–2023: F2 Logistics Cargo Movers
- 2024–present: PLDT High Speed Hitters
- 2021: Rebisco Philippines

National team
- Years: Team
- 2018–present: Philippines
Honours
Women's volleyball
Representing Philippines
ASEAN Grand Prix
Bronze medal – third place	2019 Nakhon Ratchasima	Leg 1
Bronze medal – third place	2019 Santa Rosa	Leg 2

Mary Joy "Majoy" Dela Cruz Baron (born December 12, 1995) is a Filipino volleyball player. She attended college at De La Salle University and played for its volleyball team. She is currently playing for the PLDT High Speed Hitters playing as a middle blocker. Baron is also part of the Philippine National Women's Volleyball Team.

== Personal life ==
Baron originates from Concepcion, Tarlac, where she attended Concepcion Catholic School. Aside from sports, she also works as a model.

== Career ==
Baron was a member of the DLSU Lady Spikers which won the women's UAAP Volleyball Championship from year 2016 to 2018.

Baron won the UAAP Season 78 Best Blocker award in April 2016. The following year, she won the Most Valuable Player award for UAAP Season 79. In her last playing year in the collegiate ranks, she led the squad as its team captain to their 3rd consecutive championship.

With F2 Logistics Cargo Movers, Baron won the 2017 PSL Grand Prix Conference championship and was awarded the Second Best Middle Blocker. In the following conferences and years in the league, she has bagged multiple Best Middle Blocker awards.

From 2018 to 2022, Baron was a member of the Philippines women's national volleyball team where she played as a Middle Blocker.. Baron participated in the 2019 ASEAN Grand Prix together with the Philippines women's national volleyball team where she played as the Middle Blocker. During this tournament, she was able to bag the Best Middle Blocker award from both Legs of the tournament.

After the disbandment of the F2 Logistics Cargo Movers in late 2023, she joined the PLDT High Speed Hitters.

== Awards ==
=== Individuals ===
- UAAP Season 78 "Best Blocker"
- UAAP Season 79 "Season's Most Valuable Player"
- 2017 PSL All-Filipino "1st Best Middle Blocker"
- 2017 Philippine Superliga Grand Prix "2nd Best Middle Blocker"
- 2018 Philippine Superliga Invitational Cup "2nd Best Middle Blocker"
- 2018 Philippine Superliga All-Filipino Conference "2nd Best Middle Blocker"
- 2019 Philippine Superliga All-Filipino Conference "2nd Best Middle Blocker"
- 2019 ASEAN Grand Prix - First Leg "Best Middle Blocker"
- 2019 ASEAN Grand Prix - Second Leg "Best Middle Blocker"
- 2019 Philippine Superliga Invitational Conference "1st Best Middle Blocker"
- 2019 Philippine Superliga Invitational Conference "Most Valuable Player"
- 2023 Premier Volleyball League Invitational Conference "1st Best Middle Blocker"
- 2024 Premier Volleyball League Reinforced Conference "1st Best Middle Blocker"
- 2025 Premier Volleyball League on Tour "Best Middle Blocker"

=== Collegiate ===
- 2014 UAAP Season 76 volleyball tournaments - Silver medal, with De La Salle Lady Spikers
- 2015 UAAP Season 77 volleyball tournaments - Silver medal, with De La Salle Lady Spikers
- 2016 UAAP Season 78 volleyball tournaments - Champion, with De La Salle Lady Spikers
- 2017 UAAP Season 79 volleyball tournaments - Champion, with De La Salle Lady Spikers
- 2018 UAAP Season 80 volleyball tournaments - Champion, with De La Salle Lady Spikers

=== Clubs ===
- 2016 PSL All-Filipino Conference – Champion, with F2 Logistics Cargo Movers
- 2016 PSL Grand Prix Conference - Bronze medal, with F2 Logistics Cargo Movers
- 2017 PSL All-Filipino Conference - Silver medal, with F2 Logistics Cargo Movers
- 2017 PSL Grand Prix Conference – Champion, with F2 Logistics Cargo Movers
- 2018 PSL Grand Prix Conference - Silver medal, with F2 Logistics Cargo Movers
- 2018 PSL Invitational Cup - Champion, with F2 Logistics Cargo Movers
- 2018 PSL All-Filipino Conference - Silver medal, with F2 Logistics Cargo Movers
- 2019 PSL Grand Prix Conference - Silver medal, with F2 Logistics Cargo Movers
- 2019 PSL All-Filipino Conference - Champion, with F2 Logistics Cargo Movers
- 2019 PSL Invitational Conference - Champion, with F2 Logistics Cargo Movers
- Premier Volleyball League First All-Filipino Conference - Bronze medal, with F2 Logistics Cargo Movers
- 2025 Premier Volleyball League on Tour– Champion, with PLDT High Speed Hitters
- 2025 Premier Volleyball League Invitational– Champion, with PLDT High Speed Hitters
