= Generika–Ayala Lifesavers =

- Full name: Generika–Ayala Lifesavers
- Founded: 2014
- Owner: Actimed Inc.
- Head coach: Sherwin Meneses
- Captain: Rhea Dimaculangan (UST)
- League: Philippine Super Liga (2014-2020)
- 2019 Invitational: 7th place

Uniforms
Home	Away

The Generika–Ayala Lifesavers were a women's volleyball team in the Philippines owned by Actimed Inc., opeators of Generika Drugstore. The team competed in the Philippine Super Liga (PSL) in 2014 and again from 2016 to 2020.

Generika's first venture in the PSL was a partnership with the Philippine Army Lady Troopers during the 2014 All-Filipino Conference, before establishing their own team beginning with the 2014 Grand Prix Conference after acquiring the AirAsia Flying Spikers. In 2015, the team was disbanded and its remnants formed the Shopinas.com Lady Clickers. In 2016, the team was revived and a year later, entered a new partnership with Ayala Corporation.

In December 2020, the team took a leave of absence due to the COVID-19 pandemic. The Lifesavers were also not among the PSL member teams to join the professional Premier Volleyball League (PVL).

Generika earned two podium finishes, one in 2014 and the other in 2018, but did win one championship under the Army partnership.

== History ==
Generika Drugstore first became involved in the Philippine Superliga (PSL) when it sponsored the Philippine Army Lady Troopers during the 2014 All-Filipino Conference, playing as the "Generika-Army Lady Troopers". For the following conference, the company formed its own team composed of the coaching staff and most of the players from the disbanded AirAsia Flying Spikers. The franchise did not participate during the 2015 season and remnants of the team went on to form the nucleus of the Shopinas.com Lady Clickers.

The company reactivated its PSL participation during the 2016 All-Filipino Conference with a new lineup.

Since 2017, the team was renamed "Generika Ayala Lifesavers" with the entry of Ayala Corporation as the team's co-sponsor. Ayala Corporation, through its subsidiary Ayala Healthcare Holdings, Inc., acquired 50% of Actimed Inc. (Generika Drugstore) in July 2015.As of 2019, Ayala now owns 52% of the company.

Due to the COVID-19 pandemic, the 2020 season of the PSL was cancelled. Prior to the beginning of 2021 season, the team, along with two other member teams took an indefinite leave of absence from the league.

== Name changes ==
- Generika-Army Lady Troopers (2014 Philippine Super Liga All-Filipino Conference)
- Generika LifeSavers (2014–2016)
- Generika Ayala Lifesavers (2017–2020)

== Final roster ==
For the 2020 Philippine Super Liga Grand Prix Conference:

No.	Name	Position	Ht.
1	(Philippines) Rhea Dimaculangan (c)	S	1.70 m (5 ft 7 in)
2	(Cuba) Elizabeth Vicet Campos (I)	OP	
3	(Philippines) Mariella Gabarda	MB	1.78 m (5 ft 10 in)
4	(Philippines) Carmina Aganon	OP	1.70 m (5 ft 7 in)
5	(Philippines) Patty Jane Orendain	OH	1.68 m (5 ft 6 in)
6	(Philippines) Kath Arado (L)	L	1.65 m (5 ft 5 in)
7	(Philippines) Mean Mendrez	OP	1.78 m (5 ft 10 in)
8	(Philippines) Angeline Pauline Araneta	OP	1.78 m (5 ft 10 in)
9	(Philippines) Fatima Bia General (L)	L	1.65 m (5 ft 5 in)
10	(Philippines) Eli Soyud	OH	1.78 m (5 ft 10 in)
11	(Philippines) Chester Tanika Ong	WS	
12	(Philippines) Mikaela Lopez	MB	1.71 m (5 ft 7 in)
13	(Philippines) Marlyn Llagoso	MB	1.78 m (5 ft 10 in)
14	(Philippines) May Jennifer Macatuno	S	1.57 m (5 ft 2 in)
16	(Philippines) Toni Rose Basas	OH	1.72 m (5 ft 8 in)
18	(Philippines) Ria Meneses	MB	1.85 m (6 ft 1 in)
44	(Philippines) Carol Ann Cerveza	OH	1.73 m (5 ft 8 in)

== Honors ==
=== Club ===
Season	Conference	Title	Source
2014	Grand Prix	Runner-up	
2016	All-Filipino	5th place	
2016	Grand Prix	5th place	
2017	Invitational	4th place	
2017	All-Filipino	7th place	
2017	Grand Prix	7th place	
2018	Grand Prix	7th place	
2018	Invitational	5th place	
2018	All-Filipino	3rd place	
2019	Grand Prix	6th place	
2019	All-Filipino	5th place	
2019	Invitational	7th place	
2020	Grand Prix	Cancelled	

=== Individual ===
Season	Conference	Award	Name	Source
2014	All-Filipino	Most Valuable Player	(Philippines) Tina Salak	
2014	All-Filipino	1st Best Middle Blocker	(Philippines) Mary Jean Balse	
2014	Grand Prix	1st Best Middle Blocker	(Philippines) Abigail Maraño	
2014	Grand Prix	Best Opposite Spiker	(Russia) Natalia Korobkova	
2018	Invitational	Best Scorer	(Philippines) Patty Jane Orendain	
2018	All-Filipino	2nd Best Outside Spiker	(Philippines) Patty Jane Orendain	
2018	All-Filipino	1st Best Middle Blocker	(Philippines) Marivic Velaine Meneses	
2018	All-Filipino	Best Libero	(Philippines) Kath Arado	

== Team captains ==
- (Philippines) Tina Salak (2014)
- (Philippines) Charleen Abigail Cruz (2014)
- (Philippines) Rubie de Leon (2016)
- (Philippines) Jeushl Wensh Tiu (2016)
- (Philippines) Geneveve Casugod (2017, 2017)
- (Philippines) Angeli Pauline Araneta (2017 – 2019)
- (Philippines) Rhea Dimaculangan (2020)

== Imports ==
Season	Number	Player	Country
2014	6	Miyu Shinohara	Japan
2014	20	Natalia Korobkova	Russia
2016	7	Polina Liutikova	Ukraine
2016	8	Darlene Ramdin	Trinidad and Tobago
2017	10	Darlene Ramdin	Trinidad and Tobago
2017	16	Katarina Pilepic	Croatia
2017	20	Penina Snuka	(United States) USA
2018	3	Kimberly Gutierrez	Mexico
2018	8	Darlene Ramdin	Trinidad and Tobago
2018	13	Symone Renee Hayden	(United States) USA
2019	10	Kanjana Kuthaisong	Thailand
2019	15	Nikolle del Rio	Brazil
2019	21	Kseniya Koçyiğit	Azerbaijan
2020	2	Elizabeth Vicet Campos	Cuba

== Coaches ==
- Sgt. Enrico de Guzman (2014 All-Filipino)
- Ramil de Jesus (2014 Grand Prix)
- Francis Vicente (2016–2017)
- Sherwin Meneses (2018–2020)

== Transactions ==
2018 Season

=== Grand Prix ===
==== Additions ====
- Marivic Velaine Meneses (from Petron)
- April Ross Hingpit (from Petron)

==== Subtractions ====
- Chlodia Eiriel Ysabella Cortez (to Petron)
- Mary Grace Masangkay (to Cignal)
- Shiela Marie Pineda (to United VC)
