= List of Philippine Super Liga champion teams =

This lists the champions for every conference in both men's and women's division of the Philippine Super Liga.

== Women's ==
=== Indoor volleyball ===
Season	Conference	Team	Roster	Head coach
2013	Invitational	TMS-Philippine Army Lady Troopers		Sgt. Rico de Guzman
2013	Grand Prix	TMS-Philippine Army Lady Troopers		Sgt. Rico de Guzman
2014	All-Filipino	Generika-Army Lady Troopers	1) Genie Sabas, 5) Ging Balse (c), 6) Jacqueline Alarca, 7) Joyce Palad, 8) Jovelyn Gonzaga, 10) Anngela Nunag, 11) Dahlia Cruz, 12) Ma. Theresa Iratay, 13) Rachel Daquis, 14) Nerissa Bautista, 15) Christine Agno, 16) Sara Jane Gonzales, 17) Tina Salak, 18) Jessey de Leon	Sgt. Rico de Guzman
2014	Grand Prix	Petron Blaze Spikers	1) Mary Grace Masangkay, 2) Alaina Bergsma, 3) Gretchen Ho (c), 4) Carmina Aganon, 5) Luisa Mae Zapanta, 7) Frances Molina, 8) Jozza Cabalsa, 9) Erica Adachi, 10) Sandra Delos Santos, 11) Ana Ma. Del Mundo, 12) Jennylyn Reyes, 13) Maica Morada, 15) Fille Cayetano, 16) Dindin Santiago	George Pascua
2015	All-Filipino	Petron Blaze Spikers	1) Mary Grace Masangkay, 2) Aby Maraño, 3) Rachel Daquis, 4) Carmina Aganon, 5) Luisa Mae Zapanta, 6) Jozza Cabalsa, 7) Frances Molina, 8) Alexa Micek, 9) Ivy Perez, 11) Ana Ma. Del Mundo, 12) Jennylyn Reyes, 13) Maica Morada (c), 15) Fille Cayetano, 16) Dindin Santiago-Manabat	George Pascua
2015	Grand Prix	Foton Tornadoes	1) Angeli Araneta, 2.) Katie Messing, 3.) Jaja Santiago, 4.) Patty Orendain, 5.) Kara Acevedo, 6.) Lindsay Stalzer, 7.) Ivy Remulla (c), 8.) May Macatuno, 9.) Ivy Perez, 10.) Kayla Williams, 11.) Bia General, 16.) Royce Estampa, 17.) Fiola Ceballos, 18.) Jeannie delos Reyes	Ma. Vilet Ponce de Leon
2016	Invitational	RC Cola-Army Troopers	1.) Genie Sabas, 3.) Joanne Bunag, 5.) Ging Balse-Pabayo, 7.) Tina Salak, 8.) Jovelyn Gonzaga (c), 9.) Michelle Carolino, 10.) Anngela Nunag, 12.) Royse Tubino, 13.) Rachel Daquis, 14.) Nerissa Bautista, 15.) Christine Agno, 16.) Sarah Jane Gonzales, 18.) Jeaniie delos Reyes	Kungfu Reyes
2016	Invitational	Est Cola (co-champion) (Thailand)	1.) Anisa Yotpinit, 3.) Wipawee Srithong, 6.) Chamaipon Phokha, 7.) Patcharaporn Sittisad, 8.) Tirawan Sang-ob, 9.) Sutadta Chuewulim, 10.) Sasipaporn Janthawisut, 12.) Jarasporn Bundasak (c), 13.) Tichaya Boonlert, 14.) Sineenat Phocharoen, 16.) Parinya Pankaew	Chamnan Dokmai
2016	All-Filipino	F2 Logistics Cargo Movers	1.) Desiree Cheng, 2.) Aby Maraño, 3.) Mika Reyes, 4.) Stephanie Mercado, 5.) Dawn Macandili, 6.) Ara Galang, 8.) Danika Gendrauli, 9.) Kim Fajardo, 10.) Majoy Baron, 11.) Cha Cruz (c), 15.) Kim Kianna Dy, 16.) Jocelyn Soliven, 18.) Cydthealee Demecillo, 19.) Eli Soyud	Ramil de Jesus
2016	Grand Prix	Foton Tornadoes	1.) Rhea Dimaculangan, 2.) Sisi Rondina, 3.) Jaja Santiago, 4.) Patty Jane Orindain, 5.) Maria Carmina Denise Acevedo, 6.) Ariel Usher, 8.) Angeli Araneta, 9.) Ivy Perez, 10.) Maika Ortiz, 11.) Bia General, 12.) Carol Ann Cerveza, 15.) Lindsay Stalzer (c), 16.) Dindin Santiago-Manabat, 18.) EJ Laure	Moro Branislav
2017	Invitational	Kobe Shinwa Women's University (Japan)	1.) Chihiro Fujiwara (c), 2.) Yoshimi Okada, 3.) Yuna Kato, 4.) Hana Kawabata, 8.) Wakana Harima, 9.) Yu Moriwaki, 10.) Kana Edamatsu, 11.) Hinano Michishita, 14.) Mariko Fujiwara, 15.) Yumeho Murakami, 19.) Nao Miyatake, 21.) Haruka Takabatake, 23.) Ruka Matsushima, 25.) Manaka Fukui	Kiyokazu Yamamoto
2017	Invitational	Cignal HD Spikers (co-champion)	1.) Maica Morada, 2.) Angelique Dionela, 4.) Stephanie Mercado (c), 7.) Mylene Paat, 8.) Jovelyn Gonzaga, 9.) Janine Marciano, 10.) Sandra delos Santos, 11.) Cherry Vivas, 12.) Lourdes Patilano, 13.) Rachel Daquis, 14.) May Jennifer Macatuno, 15.) Royse Tubino, 16.) Marleen Cortel, 17.) Chie Saet	George Pascua
2017	All-Filipino	Petron Blaze Spikers	1.) Bernadeth Pons, 2.) April Ross Hingpit, 3.) Mika Reyes, 4.) Carmina Aganon, 5.) Ria Beatriz Janelle Duremdes, 6.) Shiela Marie Pineda, 7.) Frances Molina (c), 8.) Aiza Maizo-Pontillas, 9.) Remy Palma, 10.) Toni Basas, 11.) Rhea Dimaculangan, 16.) Sisi Rondina, 17.) Carmela Tunay., 18.) Ria Meneses	Shaq Delos Santos
2017	Grand Prix	F2 Logistics Cargo Movers	1.) Aby Maraño, 2.) Kennedy Lynne Bryan, 3.) Carmel June Saga, 4.) Dawn Macandili, 5.) Ernestine Tiamzon, 6.) Fritz Joy Gallenero, 7.) Kim Fajardo, 8.) Majoy Baron, 9.) Cha Cruz (c), 10.) Shawna Lei-Santos, 11.) Aduke Ogunsanya, 12.) Kim Kianna Dy, 13.) María José Pérez, 14.) Desiree Cheng	Ramil de Jesus
2018	Grand Prix	Petron Blaze Spikers	1.) Khat Bell, 3.) Mika Reyes, 4.) Angelica Legacion, 5.) Yuri Fukuda, 7.) Frances Molina, 8.) Aiza Maizo-Pontillas, 9.) Remy Palma, 10.) Princess Ira Gaizer, 12.) Rhea Dimaculangan, 14.) Chlodia Eiriel Ysabella Cortez, 15.) Lindsay Stalzer (c), 16.) Luth Malaluan, 18.) Carmela Tunay	Shaq Delos Santos
2018	Invitational	F2 Logistics Cargo Movers	2.) Aby Maraño, 4.) Norielle Ipac, 5.) Dawn Macandili, 6.) Victonara Galang, 7.) Ernestine Tiamzon, 8.) Fritz Joy Gallenero, 9.) Kim Fajardo, 10.) Majoy Baron 11.) Charleen Abiegail Cruz-Behag (c), 13.) Aduke Ogunsanya, 15.) Kim Kianna Dy, 16.) Michelle Cobb, 18.) Michelle Morente, 19.) Desiree Cheng	Ramil de Jesus
2018	All-Filipino	Petron Blaze Spikers	1.) Ging Balse-Pabayo, 2.) Bernadeth Pons, 3.) Mika Reyes, 4.) Jasmine Gayle Ayalde, 5.) Ria Duremdes, 7.) Frances Molina (c), 8.) Aiza Maizo-Pontillas, 9.) Remy Palma, 11.) Princess Ira Gaiser, 12.) Rhea Dimaculangan, 14.) Chloida Eiriel Ysabella Cortez, 15.) Angelica Legacion, 16.) Sisi Rondina, 17.) Carmela Tunay	Shaq Delos Santos
2018	Collegiate Grand Slam	UP Lady Fighting Maroons	Lorie Bernardo, Maristela Genn Layug, Patricia Elise Siao, Jessma Clarice Ramos, Andreanna Pauleen Lagman, Nicole Ann Magsarile, Caryl Sandoval, Michaela Louise Osorio, Justine Dorog, Aieshalaine Gannaban, Mary Mirgie Bautista, Maria Arielle Estrañero, Diana Mae Carlos (c), Marianne Sotomil	Godfrey Okumu
2019	Grand Prix	Petron Blaze Spikers	1.) Khat Bell (c), 2.) Bernadeth Pons, 3.) Mika Aereen Reyes, 4.) Stephanie Niemer, 6.) Mary Anne Esguerra, 7.) Frances Molina, 8.) Aiza Maizo-Pontillas, 9.) Remy Palma, 10.) Toni Basas, 11.) Princess Ira Gaiser, 12.) Rhea Dimaculangan, 13.) Dennise Michelle Lazaro, 14.) Chlodia Eiriel Ysabella Cortez, 15.) Angelica Legacion, 16.) Ma. Carmela Tunay	Shaq Delos Santos
2019	All-Filipino	F2 Logistics Cargo Movers	1.) Kalei Mau, 2.) Aby Maraño (c), 3.) Maria Lourdes Clemente, 4.) Alexine Danielle Cabanos, 5.) Dawn Macandili, 6.) Victonara Galang, 9.) Kim Fajardo, 10.) Majoy Baron, 11.) Kim Kianna Dy, 12.) Carmel June Saga, 13.) Aduke Ogunsanya, 14.) Michelle Morente, 15.) Ernestine Tiamzon, 16.) Michelle Cobb, 19.) Desiree Cheng	Ramil de Jesus
2019	Invitational	F2 Logistics Cargo Movers	1.) Kalei Mau, 2.) Aby Maraño (c), 3.) Maria Lourdes Clemente, 4.) Alexine Danielle Cabanos, 5.) Dawn Macandili, 6.) Victonara Galang, 9.) Kim Fajardo, 10.) Majoy Baron, 11.) Kim Kianna Dy, 12.) Carmel June Saga, 13.) Aduke Ogunsanya, 14.) Michelle Morente, 16.) Michelle Cobb, 19.) Desiree Cheng	Ramil de Jesus
2019	2020	Grand Prix	Cancelled	

=== Beach volleyball ===
Season	Team	Roster	Head coach
2015	Giligan's Sisig Queens	Danika Gendrauli and Norie Jane Diaz	
2016	RC Cola-Army Troopers (Team A)	Jovelyn Gonzaga and Nerissa Bautista	Kungfu Reyes
2017	Petron Sprint 4T	Sisi Rondina and Bernadeth Pons	Shaq Delos Santos
2018	Petron XCS	Sisi Rondina and Bernadeth Pons	Shaq Delos Santos
2019	Petron XCS	Bernadeth Pons and Floremel Rodriguez	
2020	No tournament		
2021	Abanse Negrense (Team A)	Alexa Polidario and Erjan Magdato	Jason Delmo

== Men's ==
=== Indoor volleyball ===
Season	Conference	Team	Roster	Head coach
2013	Grand Prix	PLDT myDSL Speed Boosters		
2014	All-Filipino	PLDT Home TVolution-Air Force Power Attackers	2) Alnasip Laja, 3) Raffy Mosuela, 4) Ron Jay Galang, 5)Jeffrey Malabanan, 6) Nino Jeruz, 7) Rodolfo Labrador, 8) Arvin Avila, 9) Dante Alinsunurin (c), 10) John Paul Torres, 11) Alnakran Abdilla, 12) Roberty Boto, 14) Jason Ramos, 15) Jonathan Tan, 17) Jessie Lopez, 18) Christian Ian Fernandez	Jasper Jimenez
2014	Grand Prix	Cignal HD Spikers	1) Adam Daquer, 2) Jay Dela Cruz (c), 3) Glacy Ralph Diezmo, 4) Edmar Sanchez, 5) Dexter Clamor, 6) Sandy Domenick Montero, 7) Gilbert Ablan, 9) Ralph Joren Savellano, 11) Jeffrey Lansangan, 12) Alexis Faytaren, 14) Herschel Ramos, 15) Emmanuel Luces, 16) Rayson Fuentes	Michael Cariño

=== Beach volleyball ===
Season	Team	Roster	Head coach
2015	SM By The Bay (Team A)	Jade Becaldo and Hachaliah Gilbuena	Eric Lecain
2016	Philippine Army (Team A)	Nur-amin Madsairi and Roldan Medino	
2017	Generika-Ayala Lifesavers	Anthony Arbastro and Calvin Sarte	
2018	Foton Tornadoes	Lemuel Arbasto and Kris Roy Guzman	
2019	Cignal HD Spikers	Edmar Bonono and Alnakran Abdilla	
