= 2017 Philippine Super Liga season =

- Duration: March 4 – December 16, 2017
- TV partner(s): TV5, AksyonTV, Hyper, Sports5.ph
- Invitational champions: Kobe Shinwa Women's University; Cignal HD Spikers (co-champions)
- Invitational runners-up: Petron Blaze Spikers
- Beach Challenge champions: Women's: Petron Sprint 4T; Men's: Generika–Ayala Lifesavers
- Beach Challenge runners-up: Women's: Generika-Ayala (Team A); Men's: Cignal HD Spikers
- All-Filipino champions: Petron Blaze Spikers
- All-Filipino runners-up: F2 Logistics Cargo Movers
- Grand Prix champions: F2 Logistics Cargo Movers
- Grand Prix runners-up: Petron Blaze Spikers

Seasons
- ← 2016 2018 →

The 2017 Philippine Super Liga season was the fifth season of the Philippine Super Liga (PSL). The season followed the same conference order as the previous season, with the Invitational Cup opening the season followed by the All-Filipino and the Grand Prix conferences. The third edition of the Beach Volleyball Challenge Cup was also held in between the Invitational and All-Filipino Conferences.

== Indoor volleyball ==
=== Invitational Cup ===
2017 PSL Invitational Conference teams (Women's Division)
Abbr.	Team	Company	Colors	Head coach	Team captain
CIG	Cignal HD Spikers	Cignal TV, Inc.		(Philippines) George Pascua	Stephanie Mercado (DLSU)
CCL	COCOLIFE Asset Managers	United Coconut Planters Life Assurance Corporation		(Philippines) Roberto Javier	Michele Gumabao (DLSU)
FOT	Foton Tornadoes	United Asia Automotive Group, Inc.		(Serbia) Moro Branislav	Aleona Denise Manabat (NU)
GEN	Generika–Ayala Lifesavers	Erikagen, Inc.		(Philippines) Francis Vicente	Geneveve Casugod (FEU)
KSU	Kobe Shinwa Women's University	Kobe Shinwa Women's University		(Japan) Kiyokazu Yamamoto	Chihiro Fujiwara (KSWU)
PET	Petron Blaze Spikers	Petron Corporation		(Philippines) Cesael delos Santos	Frances Molina (San Beda)
SLR	Sta. Lucia Lady Realtors	Sta. Lucia Realty and Development Corporation		(Philippines) Michael Cariño	Djanel Welch Cheng (CSB)

Classification round (March 15 to 23, 2017):

Pos	Team	Pld	W	L	Pts	SW	SL	SR	SPW	SPL	SPR	Qualification
1	Petron Blaze Spikers	5	5	0	14	15	4	3.750	441	369	1.195	Advanced to the final round
2	Cignal HD Spikers	5	4	1	12	14	7	2.000	476	408	1.167	Advanced to the final round
3	Foton Tornadoes	5	3	2	9	11	9	1.222	436	401	1.087	Advanced to the final round
4	Generika–Ayala Lifesavers	5	2	3	6	9	10	0.900	415	423	0.981	
5	COCOLIFE Asset Managers	5	1	4	3	5	13	0.385	356	422	0.844	
6	Sta. Lucia Lady Realtors	5	0	5	1	4	15	0.267	351	452	0.777	

Final round 6th to 4th place (March 30 to April 01, 2017):

Pos	Team	Pld	W	L	Pts	SW	SL	SR	SPW	SPL	SPR
1	Generika–Ayala Lifesavers	2	2	0	5	6	2	3.000	190	167	1.138
2	COCOLIFE Asset Managers	2	1	1	2	3	5	0.600	166	178	0.933
3	Sta. Lucia Lady Realtors	2	0	2	2	4	6	0.667	202	213	0.948

Final round (March 30 to April 01, 2017):

Pos	Team	Pld	W	L	Pts	SW	SL	SR	SPW	SPL	SPR
1	Kobe Shinwa Women's University	3	3	0	9	9	2	4.500	268	215	1.247
2	Cignal HD Spikers	3	2	1	6	6	4	1.500	234	216	1.083
3	Petron Blaze Spikers	3	1	2	3	5	7	0.714	258	278	0.928
4	Foton Tornadoes	3	0	3	0	2	9	0.222	219	270	0.811

Final standings:

Rank	Team
1st place, gold medalist(s)	Kobe Shinwa Women's University; Cignal HD Spikers (co-champion)
2nd place, silver medalist(s)	Petron Blaze Spikers
3rd place, bronze medalist(s)	Foton Tornadoes
4	Generika–Ayala Lifesavers
5	COCOLIFE Asset Managers
6	Sta. Lucia Lady Realtors

Awards:

Award		Name/Team
MVP		Jovelyn Gonzaga (Cignal)
Best Outside Spiker	1st:	Frances Molina (Petron)
Best Outside Spiker	2nd:	Rachel Daquis (Cignal)
Best Middle Blocker	1st:	Chihiro Fujiwara (KSWU)
Best Middle Blocker	2nd:	Maica Morada (Cignal)
Best Opposite Spiker		Mary Grace Berte (Foton)
Best Setter		Relea Ferina Saet (Cignal)
Best Libero		Angelique Dionela (Cignal)

=== All-Filipino Conference ===
2017 PSL All-Filipino Conference teams (Women's Division)
Abbr.	Team	Company	Colors	Head coach	Team captain
CHE	Cherrylume Iron Lady Warriors	Mileage Asia Corporation		(Philippines) Lerma Giron	Mary Ann Mendrez (UE)
CIG	Cignal HD Spikers	Cignal TV, Inc.		(Philippines) George Pascua	Stephanie Mercado (DLSU)
CCL	COCOLIFE Asset Managers	United Coconut Planters Life Assurance Corporation		(Philippines) Emilio Reyes Jr.	Michele Gumabao (DLSU)
FTL	F2 Logistics Cargo Movers	F2 Global Logistics, Inc.		(Philippines) Ramil de Jesus	Charleen Cruz (DLSU)
FOT	Foton Tornadoes	United Asia Automotive Group, Inc.		(Serbia) Moro Branislav	Jaja Santiago (NU)
GEN	Generika–Ayala Lifesavers	Erikagen, Inc.		(Philippines) Francis Vicente	Geneveve Casugod (FEU)
PET	Petron Blaze Spikers	Petron Corporation		(Philippines) Cesael delos Santos	Frances Molina (San Beda)
SLR	Sta. Lucia Lady Realtors	Sta. Lucia Realty and Development Corporation		(Philippines) Michael Cariño	Djanel Welch Cheng (CSB)

Preliminary round (June 6-27, 2017):
Pool A:

Pos	Team	Pld	W	L	Pts	SW	SL	SR	SPW	SPL	SPR	Qualification
1	Cignal HD Spikers	3	3	0	8	9	4	2.250	295	267	1.105	Qualified to Pool C
2	Petron Blaze Spikers	3	2	1	5	7	5	1.400	270	232	1.164	Qualified to Pool C
3	F2 Logistics Cargo Movers	3	1	2	4	6	6	1.000	253	253	1.000	Relegated to Pool D
4	Sta. Lucia Lady Realtors	3	0	3	1	2	9	0.222	191	257	0.743	Relegated to Pool D

Pool B:

Pos	Team	Pld	W	L	Pts	SW	SL	SR	SPW	SPL	SPR	Qualification
1	Foton Tornadoes	3	3	0	9	9	1	9.000	249	198	1.258	Qualified to Pool C
2	Generika–Ayala Lifesavers	3	2	1	6	7	4	1.750	256	219	1.169	Qualified to Pool C
3	COCOLIFE Asset Managers	3	1	2	3	4	6	0.667	204	218	0.936	Relegated to Pool D
4	Cherrylume Iron Lady Warriors	3	0	3	0	0	9	0.000	151	225	0.671	Relegated to Pool D

Pool C:

Pos	Team	Pld	W	L	Pts	SW	SL	SR	SPW	SPL	SPR
1	Foton Tornadoes	6	5	1	15	17	7	2.429	544	475	1.145
2	Cignal HD Spikers	6	5	1	14	16	9	1.778	568	548	1.036
3	Petron Blaze Spikers	6	4	2	10	14	11	1.273	572	509	1.124
4	Generika–Ayala Lifesavers	6	2	4	7	11	13	0.846	523	521	1.004

Pool D:

Pos	Team	Pld	W	L	Pts	SW	SL	SR	SPW	SPL	SPR
1	F2 Logistics Cargo Movers	6	4	2	13	15	7	2.143	496	392	1.265
2	Sta. Lucia Lady Realtors	6	2	4	7	9	14	0.643	454	504	0.901
3	COCOLIFE Asset Managers	6	2	4	6	8	12	0.667	399	448	0.891
4	Cherrylume Iron Lady Warriors	6	0	6	0	1	18	0.056	312	471	0.662

Playoffs:

Fifth place
COCOLIFE Asset Managers	3
Sta. Lucia Lady Realtors	1
Seventh place
Generika–Ayala Lifesavers	3
Cherrylume Iron Lady Warriors	1

5th – 8th place semi-finals
Generika–Ayala Lifesavers	2
COCOLIFE Asset Managers	3
Sta. Lucia Lady Realtors	3
Cherrylume Iron Lady Warriors	0

Quarterfinals
1D	F2 Logistics Cargo Movers	3
4C	Generika–Ayala Lifesavers	0
3D	COCOLIFE Asset Managers	0
2C	Cignal HD Spikers	3
3C	Petron Blaze Spikers	3
2D	Sta. Lucia Lady Realtors	0
1C	Foton Tornadoes	3
4D	Cherrylume Iron Lady Warriors	0

Semifinals
F2 Logistics Cargo Movers	3
Cignal HD Spikers	0
Petron Blaze Spikers	3
Foton Tornadoes	1

Final
F2 Logistics Cargo Movers	2
Petron Blaze Spikers	3
Third place
Cignal HD Spikers	3
Foton Tornadoes	1

Final standings:

Rank	Team
1st place, gold medalist(s)	Petron Blaze Spikers
2nd place, silver medalist(s)	F2 Logistics Cargo Movers
3rd place, bronze medalist(s)	Cignal HD Spikers
4	Foton Tornadoes
5	COCOLIFE Asset Managers
6	Sta. Lucia Lady Realtors
7	Generika–Ayala Lifesavers
8	Cherrylume Iron Lady Warriors

Awards:

Award		Name/Team
MVP		Aiza Maizo-Pontillas (Petron)
Best Outside Spiker	1st:	Ennajie Laure (Foton)
Best Outside Spiker	2nd:	Victonara Galang (F2 Logistics)
Best Middle Blocker	1st:	Mary Joy Baron (F2 Logistics)
Best Middle Blocker	2nd:	Mika Aereen Reyes (Petron)
Best Opposite Spiker		Jaja Santiago (Foton)
Best Setter		Rhea Dimaculangan (Petron)
Best Libero		Angelique Beatrice Dionela (Cignal)

=== Grand Prix ===
2017 PSL Grand Prix teams (Women's Division)
Abbr.	Team	Company	Colors	Head coach	Team captain	Imports
CHD	Cignal HD Spikers	Cignal TV, Inc.		(Philippines) George Pascua	Stephanie Mercado (DLSU)	(Australia) Beth Carey (United States) Alexis Mathews (Japan) Mami Miyashita (L)
CCL	COCOLIFE Asset Managers	United Coconut Planters Life Assurance Corporation		(Philippines) Emilio Reyes Jr.	Michele Gumabao (DLSU)	(United States) Shar Latai Manu-Olevao (United States) Taylor Milton
FTL	F2 Logistics Cargo Movers	F2 Global Logistics, Inc.		(Philippines) Ramil de Jesus	Charleen Cruz (DLSU)	(United States) Kennedy Bryan (Venezuela) María José Pérez
FOT	Foton Tornadoes	United Asia Automotive Group, Inc.		(Serbia) Moro Branislav	Jaja Santiago (NU)	(Montenegro) Dragana Perunicic (Serbia) Sara Klisura (Serbia) Katarina Vukomanovic (L)
GAL	Generika–Ayala Lifesavers	Erikagen, Inc.		(Philippines) Francis Vicente	Angeli Pauline Araneta (UP)	(Croatia) Katarina Pilepic (Trinidad and Tobago) Darlene Ramdin (United States) Penina Snuka
ICO	Iriga City Oragons	Iriga City		(Philippines) Parley Tupaz	Reynelen Raterta (UM)	(Serbia) Tamara Kmezić (Japan) Samaa Miyagawa (Japan) Minami Yoshioka (L)
PET	Petron Blaze Spikers	Petron Corporation		(Philippines) Cesael delos Santos	Frances Molina (San Beda)	(United States) Hillary Hurley (United States) Lindsay Stalzer (Japan) Yuri Fukuda (L)
SLR	Sta. Lucia Lady Realtors	Sta. Lucia Realty and Development Corporation		(Philippines) Jerry Yee	Djanel Welch Cheng (CSB)	(Ukraine) Bohdana Anisova (Canada) Marisa Field (Canada) Kristen Moncks (L)
UST	Victoria Sports-UST	New San Jose Builders, Inc. and University of Santo Tomas		(Philippines) Paul Jan Doloiras	Shannen Palec (UST)	(Japan) Yukie Inamasu

Playoffs:

Quarter-finals; One-game playoff
F2 Logistics Cargo Movers	3
Iriga City Oragons	0
Cignal HD Spikers	0
COCOLIFE Asset Managers	3
Foton Tornadoes	3
Sta. Lucia Lady Realtors	1
Petron Blaze Spikers	3
Generika–Ayala Lifesavers	2

Semi-finals; One-game playoff
F2 Logistics Cargo Movers	3
COCOLIFE Asset Managers	0
Foton Tornadoes	1
Petron Blaze Spikers	3

Finals; Best-of-three series
F2 Logistics Cargo Movers	2
Petron Blaze Spikers	1
Bronze medal match
COCOLIFE Asset Managers	0
Foton Tornadoes	3

Final standing:

Rank	Team
1st place, gold medalist(s)	F2 Logistics Cargo Movers
2nd place, silver medalist(s)	Petron Blaze Spikers
3rd place, bronze medalist(s)	Foton Tornadoes
4	COCOLIFE Asset Managers
5	Cignal HD Spikers
6	Sta. Lucia Lady Realtors
7	Generika–Ayala Lifesavers
8	Iriga City Oragons
9	Victoria Sports-UST

Awards:

Award		Name/Team
MVP		(Venezuela) María José Pérez (F2 Logistics)
Best Outside Spiker	1st:	(United States) Hillary Hurley (Petron)
Best Outside Spiker	2nd:	(United States) Lindsay Stalzer (Petron)
Best Middle Blocker	1st:	(Philippines) Mika Reyes (Petron)
Best Middle Blocker	2nd:	(Philippines) Mary Joy Baron (F2 Logistics)
Best Opposite Spiker	1st:	(Philippines) Jaja Santiago (Foton)
Best Opposite Spiker	2nd:	(Philippines) Kim Kianna Dy (F2 Logistics)
Best Setter		(Philippines) Kim Fajardo (F2 Logistics)
Best Libero	1st:	(Philippines) Dawn Macandili (F2 Logistics)
Best Libero	2nd:	(Japan) Yuri Fukuda (Petron)
Best Scorer in a Match		(Serbia) Sara Klisura (Foton), 41 points

== Beach volleyball ==
=== Women's division ===
2017 PSL Beach Volleyball Challenge Cup teams (Women's Division)
Abbr.	Team	Company	Colors	Players
CIG-A	Cignal HD Spikers (Team A)	Cignal TV, Inc.		Jovelyn Gonzaga and Maica Morada
CIG-B	Cignal HD Spikers (Team B)	Cignal TV, Inc.		Janine Marciano and Mylene Paat
CCL	COCOLIFE Asset Managers	United Coconut Planters Life Assurance Corporation		Abie Nuval and Wensh Tiu
F2L-A	F2 Logistics Cargo Movers (Team A)	F2 Global Logistics, Inc.		Cyd Demecillo and Fritz Gallenero
F2L-B	F2 Logistics Cargo Movers (Team B)	F2 Global Logistics, Inc.		Aby Maraño and Cha Cruz
FOT	Foton Tornadoes	United Asia Automotive Group, Inc.		Kathleen Barrinuevo and Cherilyn Sindayen
GEN-A	Generika–Ayala Lifesavers (Team A)	Erikagen, Inc.		Patty Orendain and Fiola Ceballos
GEN-B	Generika–Ayala Lifesavers (Team B)	Erikagen, Inc.		Rosalie Pepito and Kathleen Arado
PET-A	Petron Sprint 4T	Petron Corporation		Sisi Rondina and Bernadeth Pons
PET-B	Petron XCS	Petron Corporation		Frances Molina and Bang Pineda
SLR	Sta. Lucia Lady Realtors	Sta. Lucia Realty and Development Corporation		Danika Gendrauli and Jackilyn Estoquia
UPH	UPHS-D Lady Altas	UPHS-D		Marijo Medalla and Bianca Tripoli

Playoffs:

Quarter-finals
B1	Petron Sprint 4T	21	21
C2	Cignal "B"	11	9
D1	Petron XCS	20	21	15
B2	COCOLIFE	22	14	13
A1	Cignal "A"	21	23	11
D2	Sta. Lucia	19	25	15
C1	Generika-Ayala "A"	21	21
A2	UPHS-D	11	12

Semi-finals
B1	Petron Sprint 4T	21	21
D1	Petron XCS	17	13
D2	Sta. Lucia	15	11
C1	Generika-Ayala "A"	21	21

Final
B1	Petron Sprint 4T	21	21
C1	Generika-Ayala "A"	12	18
Bronze medal match
D1	Petron XCS	10	21	15
D2	Sta. Lucia Lady Realtors	21	14	8

Final standing:

Rank	Team
1st place, gold medalist(s)	Petron Sprint 4T
2nd place, silver medalist(s)	Generika–Ayala Lifesavers (Team A)
3rd place, bronze medalist(s)	Petron XCS
4	Sta. Lucia Lady Realtors
5	Cignal HD Spikers (Team A)
6	Cignal HD Spikers (Team B)
7	UPHS-D Lady Altas
8	COCOLIFE Asset Managers
9	Generika–Ayala Lifesavers (Team B)
10	F2 Logistics Cargo Movers (Team B)
11	Foton Tornadoes
12	F2 Logistics Cargo Movers (Team A)

2017 Philippine Super Liga Beach Challenge Cup
Petron Sprint 4T
1st title (Beach)
Team roster
Sisi Rondina and Bernadeth Pons

=== Men's division ===
2017 PSL Beach Volleyball Challenge Cup teams (Men's Division)
Abbr.	Team	Company	Colors	Players
CIG	Cignal HD Spikers	Cignal TV, Inc.		Joseph Ramos and Edmar Bonono
GEN	Generika–Ayala Lifesavers	Erikagen, Inc.		Anthony Arbasto and Calvin Sarte
IEM-A	IEM Volley Masters (Team A)	Instituto Estetico Manila		Arjay Salcedo and Romnick Samson
IEM-B	IEM Volley Masters (Team B)	Instituto Estetico Manila		Michael Zamora and Carlito Delito
SM	SM By The Bay	SM Prime Holdings		J. Natividad and B. Bagunas
TVM	Team Volleyball Manila	Team Volleyball Manila		Arjay Onia and Geraint Bacon
UPH-A	UPHS-D Altas (Team A)	UPHS-D		Rey Taneo and Relan Taneo
UPH-B	UPHS-D Altas (Team B)	UPHS-D		Jay Jay Solamilio and Joebert Almodiel
WAY	Wayuk			Emmanuel Gamat and Conrad Cabrera

Playoffs:

Semifinals
06 May
Generika-Ayala	0
UPHS-D "A"	0
06 May
SM	0
Cignal	0

Final
07 May
Generika-Ayala	1
Cignal	0
3rd place match
07 May
UPHS-D "A"	0
SM	1

Final standings:

Rank	Team
1st place, gold medalist(s)	Generika–Ayala Lifesavers
2nd place, silver medalist(s)	Cignal HD Spikers
3rd place, bronze medalist(s)	SM By The Bay
4	UPHS-D "A"
5	
6	
7	
8	
9	

2017 Philippine Super Liga Beach Challenge Cup
Generika–Ayala Lifesavers
1st title (Beach)
Team roster
Anthony Arbastro and Calvin Sarte

== International competitions ==
=== 2017 AVC Asian Women's Club Championship ===
On May 9, 2017, the PSL announced that the PSL All-Stars (playing as "Rebisco-PSL Manila") would represent the Philippines in the 2017 Asian Women’s Club Volleyball Championship held in Ust-Kamenogorsk, Kazakhstan. Originally, the Philippines was to be represented by the 2016 PSL Grand Prix champions, the Foton Tornadoes, which begged off due to its depleted lineup.

Rebisco-PSL Manila finished at last place (8th).

=== 2017 Macau Invitational women's volleyball tournament ===
On July 14, 2017, a day after the Petron Blaze Spikers won the 2017 All-Filipino conference, PSL president Tats Suzara announced that Petron will play in the 2017 Macau Invitational Women’s Volleyball Tournament to be held on September 23 to 25, 2017 in Macau.

== Brand ambassador ==
- Abigail Maraño

== Broadcast partners ==
- TV5, AksyonTV, Sports5.ph
