= 2009 Shakey's V-League 1st Conference =

V-League 6th Season
Women's Finals	G1	G2	G3	Wins
UST Growling Tigresses	0	3	3	2
San Sebastian Lady Stags	3	0	0	1
- Duration: June 11–16, 2009
- Arena(s): Filoil Flying V Arena
- Finals MVP: Rhea Dimaculangan
- Semifinalists: Adamson Lady Falcons; FEU Lady Tamaraws
- TV network(s): NBN

The 2009 Shakey's V-League 1st Conference was the ninth conference of the Shakey's V-League and the first conference of the 2009 season. It started on April 19, 2009, at the Filoil Flying V Arena. Teams included defending champion and current NCAA champion San Sebastian, UAAP runner-up FEU, NCRAA champion Lyceum. Two Visayan teams, CESAFI champion USJ-R, and USLS, joined at the quarterfinals. UAAP champion La Salle decided not to compete and took a leave of absence; UP replaced the Lady Archers to complete the eight-team elimination round roster.

== Tournament format ==
A revised tournament format was issued with 10 teams participating:

- Elimination round: Round robin
  - Top four teams will qualify for quarterfinals.
  - Bottom four will be eliminated from contention.
- Quarterfinals: Round robin
  - Standings are reset back to zero.
  - Top four teams from the elimination round will be joined by the University of San Jose-Recoletos Lady Jaguars and University of St. La Salle Lady Stingers.
  - Top four teams will qualify for semi-finals
  - Bottom two teams are eliminated for a semi-finals berth.
- Semi-finals: Best-of-three series
  - #1 vs. #4
  - #2 vs. #3
- Finals: Best-of-three series
  - Championship: Winners of the semi-finals
  - Bronze match: Losers of the semi-finals
    - In case the championship series ends first, and the two teams split the series, the team with which has won the greater number of sets wins third place

NOTE: This format is official as set by the Shakey's V-League.

== Starting Line-ups ==
SEASON 6, CONFERENCE 1
School	Setter	Middle	Open	Utility	Middle	Open	Libero
Adamson	Janet Serafica*; Joanna Botor-Carpio*	Rissa Jane Laguilles	Jill Gustilo	Pau Soriano; Lilet Mabbayad*	Nerissa Bautista*	Angela Benting	Lizlee Ann Gata
Ateneo	Jamenea Ferrer	Maria Rosario Soriano*	Fille Saint Merced Cainglet; Angeline Gervacio	Ma. Carmina Denise Acevedo	Gretchen Ho	Sontaya Keawbundit*	Stephanie Gabriel
Benilde	Renilyne Kara Agero	Maureen Penetrante*	Giza Yumang	Cindy Velasquez	Ivy Remulla*	Katty Kwan	Kerlyne Joy Mulingtapang
Far Eastern	Cristina Salak*; April Linor Jose	Macaila Irish May Morada	Rachel Daquis	Mayette Carolino*; Monique Tiangco	Shaira Gonzalez	Cherry May Vivas	Rose Anne Taganas
Lyceum	Nicolette Tabafunda	Nasella Nica Guliman	Syvie Gay Aratates	Jamie Peña	Dahlia Cruz*	Joy Gazelle Cases*	Joanna Marie dela Peña
Saint La Salle							
San Jose							
San Sebastian	Charisse Vernon Ancheta	Rysabelle Devanadera	Laurence Ann Latigay	Analyn Joy Benito	Sue Roces*	Jaroensri Bualee*	Margarita Pepito
Santo Tomas	Rhea Dimaculangan; Sarah Jane Gonzales	Mikah Angela Ortiz	Bernice Abigail Co; Judy Ann Caballejo	Aiza Maizo	Mary Jean Balse*	Michelle Carolino*	Jessica Curato
UP	Rubie de Leon*	Pauline Genido	Rebecca Gail Montero	Danielle Michiko Castañeda*	Carmina Teresita Barcelon	Southlyn Ramos	Amanda Isada

== Elimination round ==
=== Team standings ===
Qualified for the quarterfinals
Qualified for a knockout game

Team	W	L	PCT	GB	SW	SL	Avg	Tie
UST Growling Tigresses	6	1	.857	--	20	8	.714	1–0
San Sebastian Lady Stags	6	1	.857	--	20	6	.769	0–1
FEU Lady Tamaraws	5	2	.714	1	16	8	.667	
Adamson Lady Falcons	4	3	.571	2	14	13	.519	
Ateneo–OraCare	4	3	.571	2	12	12	.500	
Benilde Lady Blazers	2	5	.286	3	9	19	.321	
Lyceum Lady Pirates	1	6	.142	5	12	19	.387	
UP Lady Maroons	0	7	.000	6	3	21	.125	

SW = sets won; SL = sets lost

=== Results ===
Important note: All teams played all of their opponents only once.

VS	AdU	ADMU	CSB	FEU	LPU	SSC-R	UP	UST
Adamson		3–0	3–2	0–3	3–2	1–3	3–0	1–3
Ateneo	0–3		3–0	0–3	3–1	0–3	3–0	3–2
Benilde	2–3	0–3		1–3	3–2	0–3	3–2	0–3
FEU	3–0	3–0	3–1		3–1	0–3	3–0	1–3
Lyceum	2–3	1–3	2–3	1–3		2–3	3–1	1–3
San Sebastian	3–1	3–0	3–0	3–0	3–2		3–0	2–3
UP	0–3	0–3	2–3	0–3	1–3	0–3		0–3
UST	3–1	2–3	3–0	3–1	3–1	3–2	3–0	

== Exhibition game ==
May 17, 2:00PM – Filoil Flying V Arena, San Juan
Team	1	2	3	4	Sets
USLS	25	22	25	25	3
USJ–R	20	25	22	23	1

== Fourth-seed playoff ==
May 17, 4:00PM – Filoil Flying V Arena, San Juan
Team	1	2	3	4	5	Sets
Adamson	23	25	26	20	15	3
Ateneo–OraCare	25	18	24	25	11	2

Adamson advances to quarterfinals; Ateneo is eliminated.

== Quarterfinals ==
=== Team standings ===
Qualified for semi-finals

Team	W	L	PCT	GB	SW	SL	Avg
UST Growling Tigresses	5	0	1.000	--	15	4	.789
San Sebastian Lady Stags	4	1	.800	1	13	5	.722
Adamson Lady Falcons	3	2	.600	2	12	6	.667
FEU Lady Tamaraws	2	3	.400	3	7	10	.411
USLS Lady Stingers	1	4	.200	4	5	12	.294
USJ–R Lady Jaguars	0	5	.000	5	0	15	.000

=== Results ===
VS	AdU	FEU	SSC-R	USJ-R	USLS	UST
Adamson		3–0	2–3	3–0	3–0	1–3
FEU	0–3		0–3	3–0	3–1	1–3
San Sebastian	3–2	3–0		3–0	3–0	1–3
USJ–R	0–3	0–3	0–3		0–3	0–3
USLS	0–3	1–3	0–3	3–0		1–3
UST	3–1	3–1	3–1	3–0	3–1	

== Bracket ==
Best-of-3 semifinals
1	UST	2
4	FEU	1
2	San Sebastian	2
3	Adamson	0

Best-of-3 Finals
1	UST	2
2	San Sebastian	1
Best-of-3 third-place
4	FEU	0
3	Adamson	2

== Semifinals ==
=== UST–FEU series ===
June 4, 4:00PM – Filoil Flying V Arena, San Juan
Team	1	2	3	4	Sets
UST	25	25	22	25	3
FEU	14	23	25	18	1

UST leads series 1–0

June 7, 2:00PM – Filoil Flying V Arena, San Juan
Team	1	2	3	4	Sets
UST	25	23	21	23	1
FEU	16	25	25	25	3

Series tied 1–1

June 9, 4:00PM – Filoil Flying V Arena, San Juan
Team	1	2	3	Sets
UST	25	25	25	3
FEU	20	21	14	0

UST wins series 2–1

=== San Sebastian–Adamson series ===
June 4, 2:00PM – Filoil Flying V Arena, San Juan
Team	1	2	3	Sets
Adamson	14	20	18	0
San Sebastian	25	25	25	3

SSC-R leads series 1–0

June 7, 4:00PM – Filoil Flying V Arena, San Juan
Team	1	2	3	Sets
Adamson	14	22	14	0
San Sebastian	25	25	25	3

SSC-R wins series 2–0

== Finals ==
=== Bronze series ===
June 11, 2:00PM – Filoil Flying V Arena, San Juan
Team	1	2	3	4	Sets
Adamson	26	25	25	25	3
FEU	24	17	27	19	1

Adamson leads series 1–0

June 14, 2:00PM – Filoil Flying V Arena, San Juan
Team	1	2	3	Sets
Adamson	27	25	25	3
FEU	25	23	23	0

Adamson wins series 2-0

=== Championship series ===
June 11, 4:00PM – Filoil Flying V Arena, San Juan
Team	1	2	3	Sets
UST	17	22	19	0
San Sebastian	25	25	25	3

SSC-R leads series 1–0

June 14, 4:00PM – Filoil Flying V Arena, San Juan
Team	1	2	3	Sets
UST	25	25	25	3
San Sebastian	21	22	23	0

Series tied 1–1

June 16, 4:00PM – Filoil Flying V Arena, San Juan
Team	1	2	3	Sets
UST	25	25	25	3
San Sebastian	18	20	22	0

UST wins series 2–1

== Final ranking ==
- Champion - UST Growling Tigresses
- 1st runner-up - San Sebastian Lady Stags
- 2nd runner-up - Adamson Lady Falcons
- 3rd runner-up - FEU Lady Tamaraws

== Awards ==
- Best scorer: Jaroensri Bualee (SSC-R)
- Best attacker: Laurence Ann Latigay (SSC-R)
- Best blocker: Aiza Maizo (UST)
- Best setter: Rhea Dimaculangan (UST)
- Best digger: Lizlee Ann Gata (Adamson)
- Best server: Macaila Irish May Morada (FEU)
- Best receiver: Margarita Pepito (SSC-R)
- Most Improved Player: Shaira Gonzalez (FEU)
- Conference MVP: Mary Jean Balse (UST)
- Finals MVP: Rhea Dimaculangan (UST)
