= 2017 PSL season =

The 2017 PSL season may refer to:

- 2017 Pakistan Super League
- 2017 Philippine Super Liga season
