= Katarina Vukomanović =

Serbian volleyball player

Personal information
- Nationality: Serbian
- Born: October 26, 1990 (age 36); Belgrade, Serbia
- Hometown: Belgrade, Serbia
- Height: 1.75 m (5 ft 9 in)
- Weight: 63 kg (139 lb)
- Spike: 257 cm (101 in)
- Block: 267 cm (105 in)
- Education: University of Belgrade

Volleyball information
- Position: Libero
- Current club: CSM Târgoviște
- Number: 7

Career
Years	Teams
2002–2007; 2007–2009; 2009–2012; 2012–2016; 2016–2017; 2017–2018; 2018–2019; 2019–2020	Volley Star; Radnički; Vizura Beograd; Tent Obrenovac; Crvena Zvezda; Foton Tornadoes; CSM Lugoj; CSM Târgoviște

National team
2006–2009	Serbia U-18

Katarina Vukomanović (Serbian Cyrillic: Катарина Вукомановић; born 26 October 1990) is a Serbian professional volleyball player who plays the libero position. She was part of the Serbian junior national team that won the gold medal at the 2007 Balkan Championship. Her current club is CSM Târgoviște.

== Career ==
Vukomanović was a member of the Serbian junior national team from 2006 to 2009. She was part of the squad that won the silver and gold medals at the 2006 and 2007 Balkan Championships. Her most notable achievement as a player happened in 2006 when she won the Best Libero award in the Balkan Championship.

She was also a member of the team that competed at the 2008 European Championship, which finished at 4th place.

From 2002 to 2017, she played for various Serbian volleyball clubs. She debuted her professional career with Volley Star in 2002. After staying with the club for 5 years, she transferred to Radnički, which competed at the 2007/2008 and 2008/2009 European Cups.

In 2009, she joined Vizura Beograd that participated at the 2011 and 2012 European Cups. The club also competed at the 2011 Serbian Super League and won the silver medal.

In 2012, Vukomanović transferred to Tent Obrenovac that played at the 2013 European Cup. She won silver medals at the 2012 and 2015 Serbian Cups with the club. She stayed with the team for 4 years then joined Crvena Zvezda in 2016.

In mid 2017, she went to the Philippines to join Foton Tornadoes that plays in the Philippine Super Liga. The club won the bronze medal at the 2017 PSL Grand Prix Conference.

In January 2018, she went back to Manila for another PSL season with Foton Tornadoes, which finished at 3rd place at the 2018 PSL Grand Prix Conference. Vukomanović won the 2nd Best Libero award.

In late 2018, Vukomanović went to Romania to join CSM Lugoj, a volleyball club that plays in the Divizia A1, and she played as their libero for the 2018–19 season. The team finished at 5th place after the finals.

In July 2019, CSM Târgoviște announced that the club has secured the service of Vukomanović for the 2019–20 Divizia A1 season.

== Personal life ==
Vukomanović went to Zemunska Gimnazija for high school. She obtained her Master's degree in Sports and Physical Education from University of Belgrade. She was also a professor at the Faculty of Sport and Physical Education from 2010 to 2015.

== Clubs ==
- (Serbia) Volley Star (2002–2007)
- (Serbia) Radnički (2007–2009)
- (Serbia) Vizura Beograd (2009–2012)
- (Serbia) Tent Obrenovac (2012–2016)
- (Serbia) Crvena Zvezda (2016–2017)
- (Philippines) Foton Tornadoes (2017–2018)
- (Romania) CSM Lugoj (2018–2019)
- (Romania) CSM Târgoviște (2019–2020)

== Awards ==
=== Individuals ===
- 2006 Balkan Championship "Best Libero"
- 2018 Philippine Super Liga Grand Prix "2nd Best Libero"

=== National team ===
- 2006 Balkan Championship – Runner-up, with Serbia U-18
- 2007 Balkan Championship – Champion, with Serbia U-18

=== Clubs ===
- 2011 Serbian Super League – Runner-up, with Vizura Beograd
- 2012 Serbian Cup – Runner-up, with Vizura Beograd
- 2015 Serbian Cup – Runner-up, with Tent Obrenovac
- 2017 Philippine SuperLiga Grand Prix – Third, with Foton Tornadoes
- 2018 Philippine SuperLiga Grand Prix – Third, with Foton Tornadoes
