= 2017 Philippine Super Liga All-Filipino Conference =

Second indoor conference of the 2017 Philippine Super Liga season

- Duration: June 6 – July 13, 2017
- Teams: 8
- TV partner(s): TV5, AksyonTV, Sports5.ph

Results
- Champions: Petron Blaze Spikers
- Runners-up: F2 Logistics Cargo Movers
- Third place: Cignal HD Spikers
- Fourth place: Foton Tornadoes

Awards
- MVP: Aiza Maizo-Pontillas
- Best OH: EJ Laure; Ara Galang
- Best MB: Majoy Baron; Mika Reyes
- Best OPP: Jaja Santiago
- Best Setter: Rhea Dimaculangan
- Best Libero: Angelique Dionela

PSL All-Filipino Conference chronology
- < 2016 2018 >

PSL conference chronology
- < 2017 Invitational 2017 Grand Prix >
- < 2017 BVCC

The 2017 Philippine Super Liga All-Filipino Conference (also known as the 2017 Rebisco Philippine Super Liga All-Filipino Conference due to sponsorship reasons) was the second conference of the 2017 season of the Philippine Super Liga (PSL) and the fourth running of the All-Filipino Conference. The tournament ran from June 6 to July 13, 2017, with the formal opening ceremonies taking place on June 10 at the Filoil Flying V Centre in San Juan.

The league expanded back to eight teams with the debut of the Cherrylume Iron Lady Warriors and the return of the F2 Logistics Cargo Movers.

PSL chairman Philip Ella Juico announced that half of the ticket sales for the June 6 and 8 games will be donated to Ian Lariba, the 2016 Summer Olympics competitor who has been diagnosed with acute myeloid leukemia.

The Petron Blaze Spikers won their third PSL championship after defeating F2 Logistics in the finals in what would go on to spark a rivalry between the two sides. On July 14, a day after Petron's triumph, PSL president Tats Suzara announced that Petron will play in the 2017 Macau Invitational Women’s Volleyball Tournament to be held on September 23 to 25, 2017 in Macau.

== Teams ==
2017 Philippine Super Liga All-Filipino Conference
Abbr.	Team	Affiliation	Head coach	Team captain
CHE	Cherrylume Iron Lady Warriors	Mileage Asia Corporation	(Philippines) Lerma Giron	Mean Mendrez
CIG	Cignal HD Spikers	Cignal TV, Inc.	(Philippines) George Pascua	Stephanie Mercado
CCL	Cocolife Asset Managers	United Coconut Planters Life Assurance Corporation	(Philippines) Kungfu Reyes	Michele Gumabao
FTL	F2 Logistics Cargo Movers	F2 Global Logistics, Inc.	(Philippines) Ramil de Jesus	Cha Cruz
FOT	Foton Tornadoes	United Asia Automotive Group, Inc.	(Serbia) Moro Branislav	Jaja Santiago
GEN	Generika–Ayala Lifesavers	Erikagen, Inc.	(Philippines) Francis Vicente	Geneveve Casugod
PET	Petron Blaze Spikers	Petron Corporation	(Philippines) Shaq Delos Santos	Frances Molina
SLR	Sta. Lucia Lady Realtors	Sta. Lucia Realty and Development Corporation	(Philippines) Sammy Acaylar	Djanel Cheng

== Format ==
Preliminary round

- In the preliminary round, teams were split into two pools.
- The preliminary round was composed of two single round-robin tournaments, with each team playing one match against all other teams in their pool.
- After playing three matches, teams were assigned to new pools based on results from their initial pools. The top two teams from each pool were grouped together with the same process for the bottom two from each pool.
- By the end of the preliminary round, all teams will have played a total of six matches.

Quarterfinals

- The quarterfinals featured single-elimination matches.
- The match-ups were as follows:
  - QF1: C1 vs. D4
  - QF2: C2 vs. D3
  - QF3: C3 vs. D2
  - QF4: C4 vs. D1
- The winners advanced to the semifinals while the losers would play in the 5th–8th classification round.

Semifinals and 5th–8th classification round

- The semifinals and 5th–8th classification round also featured single-elimination matches.
- The semifinals match-ups were as follows:
  - SF1: QF1 winner vs. QF3 winner
  - SF2: QF2 winner vs. QF4 winner
- The winners advanced to the championship match while the losers would play in the third-place match.
- The 5th–8th classification round match-ups were as follows:
  - CL1: QF1 loser vs. QF3 loser
  - CL2: QF2 loser vs. QF4 loser
- The winners advanced to the fifth-place match while the losers would play in the seventh-place match.

Finals

- All matches were single-elimination except the championship which was a best-of-three series.
- The match-ups were as follows:
  - Championship: Semifinal round winners
  - Third-place match: Semifinal round losers
  - Fifth-place match: 5th–8th classification round winners
  - Seventh-place match: 5th–8th classification round losers

== Preliminary round ==
=== Pool A ===
Pos	Team	Pld	W	L	Pts	SW	SL	SR	SPW	SPL	SPR	Qualification
1	Cignal HD Spikers	3	3	0	8	9	4	2.250	295	267	1.105	Pool C
2	Petron Blaze Spikers	3	2	1	5	7	5	1.400	270	232	1.164	Pool C
3	F2 Logistics Cargo Movers	3	1	2	4	6	6	1.000	253	253	1.000	Pool D
4	Sta. Lucia Lady Realtors	3	0	3	1	2	9	0.222	191	257	0.743	Pool D

Date	Time		Score		Set 1	Set 2	Set 3	Set 4	Set 5	Total	Report
08 June	15:00	Sta. Lucia Lady Realtors	2–3	Cignal HD Spikers	25–19	18–25	13–25	25–23	12–15	93–107	P-2
08 June	19:00	Petron Blaze Spikers	3–2	F2 Logistics Cargo Movers	23–25	23–25	25–14	25–15	15–9	111–88	P-2
10 June	19:00	Cignal HD Spikers	3–1	Petron Blaze Spikers	15–25	25–22	25–18	25–19		90–84	P-2
13 June	15:00	F2 Logistics Cargo Movers	1–3	Cignal HD Spikers	25–27	21–25	25–21	19–25		90–98	P-2
13 June	17:00	Petron Blaze Spikers	3–0	Sta. Lucia Lady Realtors	25–18	25–16	25–20			75–54	P-2
15 June	19:00	F2 Logistics Cargo Movers	3–0	Sta. Lucia Lady Realtors	25–14	25–14	25–16			75–44	P-2

=== Pool B ===
Pos	Team	Pld	W	L	Pts	SW	SL	SR	SPW	SPL	SPR	Qualification
1	Foton Tornadoes	3	3	0	9	9	1	9.000	249	198	1.258	Pool C
2	Generika–Ayala Lifesavers	3	2	1	6	7	4	1.750	256	219	1.169	Pool C
3	Cocolife Asset Managers	3	1	2	3	4	6	0.667	204	218	0.936	Pool D
4	Cherrylume Iron Lady Warriors	3	0	3	0	0	9	0.000	151	225	0.671	Pool D

Date	Time		Score		Set 1	Set 2	Set 3	Set 4	Set 5	Total	Report
06 June	17:00	Foton Tornadoes	3–0	Cherrylume Iron Lady Warriors	25–21	25–16	25–17			75–54	P-2
06 June	19:00	Cocolife Asset Managers	1–3	Generika–Ayala Lifesavers	14–25	25–23	15–25	14–25		68–98	P-2
08 June	17:00	Cherrylume Iron Lady Warriors	0–3	Cocolife Asset Managers	16–25	17–25	11–25			44–75	
10 June	17:00	Generika–Ayala Lifesavers	1–3	Foton Tornadoes	20–25	23–25	25–23	15–25		83–98	P-2
13 June	19:00	Foton Tornadoes	3–0	Cocolife Asset Managers	26–24	25–20	25–17			76–61	P-2
15 June	17:00	Cherrylume Iron Lady Warriors	0–3	Generika–Ayala Lifesavers	16–25	20–25	17–25			53–75	P-2

=== Pool C ===
Pos	Team	Pld	W	L	Pts	SW	SL	SR	SPW	SPL	SPR
1	Foton Tornadoes	6	5	1	15	17	7	2.429	544	475	1.145
2	Cignal HD Spikers	6	5	1	14	16	9	1.778	568	548	1.036
3	Petron Blaze Spikers	6	4	2	10	14	11	1.273	572	509	1.124
4	Generika–Ayala Lifesavers	6	2	4	7	11	13	0.846	523	521	1.004

Date	Time		Score		Set 1	Set 2	Set 3	Set 4	Set 5	Total	Report
17 June	19:00	Foton Tornadoes	3–1	Cignal HD Spikers	25–22	16–25	25–22	25–14		91–83	P-2
20 June	15:00	Petron Blaze Spikers	3–1	Generika–Ayala Lifesavers	25–21	24–26	25–21	25–18		99–86	P-2
22 June	17:00	Generika–Ayala Lifesavers	2–3	Foton Tornadoes	25–19	25–20	18–25	15–25	7–15	90–104	P-2
22 June	19:00	Cignal HD Spikers	3–1	Petron Blaze Spikers	11–25	25–23	29–27	26–24		91–99	P-2
24 June	19:00	Foton Tornadoes	2–3	Petron Blaze Spikers	20–25	25–18	25–21	19–25	11–15	100–104	P-2
27 June	19:00	Generika–Ayala Lifesavers	1–3	Cignal HD Spikers	25–19	28–30	22–25	16–25		91–99	P-2

=== Pool D ===
Pos	Team	Pld	W	L	Pts	SW	SL	SR	SPW	SPL	SPR
1	F2 Logistics Cargo Movers	6	4	2	13	15	7	2.143	496	392	1.265
2	Sta. Lucia Lady Realtors	6	2	4	7	9	14	0.643	454	504	0.901
3	Cocolife Asset Managers	6	2	4	6	8	12	0.667	399	448	0.891
4	Cherrylume Iron Lady Warriors	6	0	6	0	1	18	0.056	312	471	0.662

Date	Time		Score		Set 1	Set 2	Set 3	Set 4	Set 5	Total	Report
17 June	15:00	Sta. Lucia Lady Realtors	3–1	Cherrylume Iron Lady Warriors	25–20	21–25	25–17	25–16		96–78	P-2
17 June	17:00	Cocolife Asset Managers	0–3	F2 Logistics Cargo Movers	16–25	12–25	16–25			44–75	P-2
20 June	17:00	F2 Logistics Cargo Movers	3–0	Cherrylume Iron Lady Warriors	25–5	25–10	25–11			75–26	P-2
20 June	19:00	Sta. Lucia Lady Realtors	3–1	Cocolife Asset Managers	23–25	25–17	25–17	25–17		98–76	P-2
24 June	17:00	F2 Logistics Cargo Movers	3–1	Sta. Lucia Lady Realtors	25–18	25–16	18–25	25–10		93–69	P-2
27 June	17:00	Cherrylume Iron Lady Warriors	0–3	Cocolife Asset Managers	22–25	16–25	19–25			57–75	P-2

== Playoffs ==
=== Bracket ===
Fifth place match (single-elimination)
D2	Sta. Lucia	1
D3	Cocolife	3
Seventh place match (single-elimination)
D4	Cherrylume	1
C4	Generika–Ayala	3

5th–8th classification (single-elimination)
D4	Cherrylume	0
D2	Sta. Lucia	3
C4	Generika–Ayala	2
D3	Cocolife	3

Quarterfinals (single-elimination)
C1	Foton	3
D4	Cherrylume	0
C3	Petron	3
D2	Sta. Lucia	0
C4	Generika–Ayala	0
D1	F2 Logistics	3
C2	Cignal	3
D3	Cocolife	0

Semifinals (single-elimination)
C1	Foton	1
C3	Petron	3
D1	F2 Logistics	3
C2	Cignal	0

Championship (best-of-three)
C3	Petron	3	3	–
D1	F2 Logistics	0	2	–
Third place match (single-elimination)
C1	Foton	1
C2	Cignal	3

=== Quarterfinals ===
Date	Time		Score		Set 1	Set 2	Set 3	Set 4	Set 5	Total	Report
29 June	17:00	Generika–Ayala Lifesavers	0–3	F2 Logistics Cargo Movers	14–25	19–25	17–25			50–75	P-2
29 June	19:00	Cignal HD Spikers	3–0	Cocolife Asset Managers	25–17	25–10	25–20			75–47	P-2
01 July	17:00	Petron Blaze Spikers	3–0	Sta. Lucia Lady Realtors	25–7	26–24	25–16			76–47	P-2
01 July	19:00	Foton Tornadoes	3–0	Cherrylume Iron Lady Warriors	25–22	25–20	25–11			75–53	P-2

=== 5th to 8th classification ===
Date	Time		Score		Set 1	Set 2	Set 3	Set 4	Set 5	Total	Report
04 July	17:00	Generika–Ayala Lifesavers	2–3	Cocolife Asset Managers	18–25	22–25	25–17	25–19	10–15	100–101	P-2
04 July	19:00	Sta. Lucia Lady Realtors	3–0	Cherrylume Iron Lady Warriors	25–15	25–14	25–20			75–49	P-2

=== 7th place ===
Date	Time		Score		Set 1	Set 2	Set 3	Set 4	Set 5	Total	Report
08 July	17:00	Generika–Ayala Lifesavers	3–1	Cherrylume Iron Lady Warriors	25–19	25–11	23–25	25–17		98–72	P-2

=== 5th place ===
Date	Time		Score		Set 1	Set 2	Set 3	Set 4	Set 5	Total	Report
08 July	19:00	Cocolife Asset Managers	3–1	Sta. Lucia Lady Realtors	18–25	25–22	25–21	25–20		93–88	P-2

=== Semifinals ===
Date	Time		Score		Set 1	Set 2	Set 3	Set 4	Set 5	Total	Report
06 July	17:00	F2 Logistics Cargo Movers	3–0	Cignal HD Spikers	25–15	25–15	25–14			75–44	P-2
06 July	19:00	Petron Blaze Spikers	3–1	Foton Tornadoes	25–21	22–25	25–9	25–16		97–71	P-2

=== Bronze match ===
Date	Time		Score		Set 1	Set 2	Set 3	Set 4	Set 5	Total	Report
11 July	17:00	Cignal HD Spikers	3–1	Foton Tornadoes	25–16	25–18	20–25	25–22		95–81	P-2

=== Finals ===
Date	Time		Score		Set 1	Set 2	Set 3	Set 4	Set 5	Total	Report
11 July	19:00	F2 Logistics Cargo Movers	0–3	Petron Blaze Spikers	23–25	21–25	19–25			63–75	P-2
13 July	18:30	Petron Blaze Spikers	3–2	F2 Logistics Cargo Movers	26–24	24–26	24–26	25–23	15–11	114–110	

== Final standing ==
Rank	Team
1st place, gold medalist(s)	Petron Blaze Spikers
2nd place, silver medalist(s)	F2 Logistics Cargo Movers
3rd place, bronze medalist(s)	Cignal HD Spikers
4	Foton Tornadoes
5	Cocolife Asset Managers
6	Sta. Lucia Lady Realtors
7	Generika–Ayala Lifesavers
8	Cherrylume Iron Lady Warriors

2017 PSL All-Filipino
Petron Blaze Spikers
Team roster

Bernadeth Pons, April Ross Hingpit, Mika Reyes, Carmina Aganon, Ria Beatriz Janelle Duremdes, Bang Pineda, Frances Molina (c), Aiza Maizo-Pontillas, Mary Remy Joy Palma, Toni Rose Basas, Rhea Dimaculangan, Sisi Rondina, Carmela Tunay, Marivic Meneses
Head coach
Cesael delos Santos

== Individual awards ==
Award		Name/Team
MVP		Aiza Maizo-Pontillas (Petron)
Best Outside Spiker	1st:	EJ Laure (Foton)
Best Outside Spiker	2nd:	Ara Galang (F2 Logistics)
Best Middle Blocker	1st:	Majoy Baron (F2 Logistics)
Best Middle Blocker	2nd:	Mika Reyes (Petron)
Best Opposite Spiker		Jaja Santiago (Foton)
Best Setter		Rhea Dimaculangan (Petron)
Best Libero		Angelique Beatrice Dionela (Cignal)

== Venues ==
- Filoil Flying V Arena (main venue)

"Spike on Tour" Venues:

- Bacoor City Strike Gym (June 15)
- Batangas City Convention Center (June 24)
- Baliwag Star Arena (June 27)
- Imus Sports Center (July 4)
- Muntinlupa Sports Complex (July 6)
- De La Salle Lipa Sentrum (July 8)

== Broadcast partners ==
- Sports5: AksyonTV, TV5, Hyper (SD and HD), Sports5.ph
