= 2009 Shakey's V-League 2nd Conference =

Shakey's V-League 6th Season
Women's Finals	G1	G2	Wins
UST Growling Tigresses	3	3	2
Adamson Lady Falcons	1	1	0
- Duration: October 13-December 1, 2009
- Arena(s): Filoil Flying V Arena
- Finals MVP: Aiza Maizo
- Semifinalists: FEU Lady Tamaraws; San Sebastian Lady Stags
- TV network(s): NBN

The 2009 Shakey's V-League 2nd Conference was the tenth conference of the Shakey's V-League and the second conference of the 2009 season. It was held in October 2009 at the Filoil Flying V Arena. Second Conference shall be governed by the FIVB Official Volleyball Rules. The participating teams are the same as at the last conference, but without the two Visayan teams.

== Tournament format ==
- Preliminaries
  - The eight participating teams will play one round. The six teams with the best win–loss records, after the round, will qualify into the quarter-finals.
  - In the event of a two-way tie for 6th place, the tie will be resolved by a play-off game.
  - If three or more teams are tied for 6th place, FIVB Rules shall apply to determine the best two which will play-off to resolve the tie.
- Quarter-finals
  - The six qualified teams will play one round. With the win–loss records of the preliminaries carried over into the quarter-finals, the four teams with the best win–loss records, after the round, will qualify into the semi-finals.
  - In the event of a two-way tie for 4th place, the tie will be resolved by a play-off game.
  - If three or more teams are tied for 4th place, FIVB Rules shall apply to determine the best two which will play-off to resolve the tie.
- Semi-finals
  - A best-of-three series will be played between the 1st and 4th placed teams of the quarters.
  - A best-of-three series will be played between the 2nd and 3rd placed teams of the quarters.
- Finals
  - A best-of-three series will be played between the 2 winners of the semis for the gold.
  - A best-of-three series will be played between the 2 losers of the semis for the bronze.
  - If the gold medalist is determined in two games, the series for the bronze medal will also end in two games. If the contenders for the bronze are tied after two games, then FIVB Rules will determine the winner.

== Preliminaries ==
=== Team standings ===
Qualified for quarterfinals

Team	W	L	PCT	GB	SW	SL	Avg
UST Growling Tigresses	7	0	1.000	--	21	3	.875
FEU Lady Tamaraws	6	1	.833	1	19	8	.704
San Sebastian Lady Stags	5	2	.714	2	14	9	.609
Ateneo Lady Eagles	4	3	.571	3	16	12	.571
Adamson Lady Falcons	3	4	.429	4	15	15	.500
Benilde Lady Blazers	2	5	.286	5	7	15	.318
Lyceum Lady Pirates	1	6	.143	6	6	19	.240
UP Lady Maroons	0	7	.000	7	2	21	.087

=== Results ===
Win
Loss

Important note: All teams played all of their opponents only once.

VS	AdU	ADMU	CSB	FEU	LPU	SSC-R	UP	UST
Adamson		2–3	3–0	1–3	3–2	2–3	3–0	1–3
Ateneo	3–2		3–0	1–3	3–1	2–3	3–0	1–3
Benilde	0–3	0–3		1–3	3–0	0–3	3–0	0–3
FEU	3–1	3–1	3–1		3–0	3–2	3–0	1–3
Lyceum	2–3	1–3	0–3	0–3		0–3	3–1	0–3
San Sebastian	3–2	3–2	3–0	2–3	3–0		3–1	0–3
UP	0–3	0–3	0–3	0–3	1–3	1–3		0–3
UST	3–1	3–1	3–0	3–1	3–0	3–0	3–0	

== Quarterfinals ==
=== Team standings ===
Qualified for semifinals
Qualified for knockout game

Team	W	L	PCT	GB	SW	SL	Avg	PO
UST Growling Tigresses	10	2	.833	--	33	11	.750	
San Sebastian Lady Stags	8	4	.667	2	27	20	.574	
Adamson Lady Falcons	7	5	.583	3	28	20	.583	
FEU Lady Tamaraws	7	5	.583	3	27	21	.563	
Ateneo Lady Eagles	7	5	.583	3	26	22	.542	
Benilde Lady Blazers	3	9	.250	7	12	27	.308	

=== Results ===
Win
Loss

Important note: All teams played all of their opponents only once.

VS	AdU	ADMU	CSB	FEU	SSC-R	UST
Adamson		3–1	3–0	3–2	3–0	1–3
Ateneo	1–3		0–3	3–1	3–1	3–2
Benilde	0–3	3–0		1–3	1–3	0–3
FEU	2–3	1–3	3–1		1–3	1–3
San Sebastian	0–3	1–3	3–1	3–1		3–1
UST	3–1	2–3	3–0	3–1	1–3	

== Bracket ==
Fourth-seed playoff
4	FEU	3
5	Ateneo	2

Best-of-3 Semifinals
1	UST	2
4	FEU	0
2	San Sebastian	0
3	Adamson	2

Best-of-3 Finals
1	UST	2
3	Adamson	0
Best-of-3 for third
4	FEU	2
2	San Sebastian	0

== Fourth-seed playoff ==
November 22, 4:00PM – Filoil Flying V Arena, San Juan
Team	1	2	3	4	5	Sets
FEU	25	22	25	25	15	3
Ateneo	12	25	27	19	9	2

== Semifinals ==
=== UST vs. FEU ===
November 24, 4:00PM – Filoil Flying V Arena, San Juan
Team	1	2	3	Sets
UST	25	25	25	3
FEU	20	22	20	0

UST leads series, 1-0

November 27, 2:00PM – Filoil Flying V Arena, San Juan
Team	1	2	3	4	Sets
FEU	22	25	23	19	1
UST	25	16	25	25	3

UST wins series, 2-0

=== San Sebastian vs. Adamson ===
November 24, 2:00PM – Filoil Flying V Arena, San Juan
Team	1	2	3	4	5	Sets
San Sebastian	17	25	25	11	11	2
Adamson	25	22	22	25	15	3

AdU leads series, 1-0

November 27, 4:00PM – Filoil Flying V Arena, San Juan
Team	1	2	3	Sets
Adamson	25	25	25	3
San Sebastian	13	19	22	0

AdU wins series, 2-0

== Finals ==
=== Bronze series ===
November 29, 2:00PM – Filoil Flying V Arena, San Juan
Team	1	2	3	4	5	Sets
San Sebastian	23	11	25	25	13	2
FEU	25	25	10	23	15	3

FEU leads series, 1-0

December 1, 2:00PM – Filoil Flying V Arena, San Juan
Team	1	2	3	4	5	Sets
FEU	25	10	25	20	15	3
San Sebastian	23	25	11	25	11	2

FEU wins series, 2-0

=== Championship series ===
November 29, 4:00PM – Filoil Flying V Arena, San Juan
Team	1	2	3	4	Sets
UST	25	19	25	25	3
Adamson	15	25	22	21	1

UST leads series, 1-0

December 1, 4:00PM – Filoil Flying V Arena, San Juan
Team	1	2	3	4	Sets
Adamson	25	12	25	19	1
UST	23	25	27	25	3

UST wins series, 2-0

== Final ranking ==
- Champion - UST Growling Tigresses
- 1st runner-up - Adamson Lady Falcons
- 2nd runner-up - FEU Lady Tamaraws
- 3rd runner-up - San Sebastian Lady Stags

== Awards ==
- Best scorer: Angela Benting (Adamson)
- Best attacker: Giza Yumang (CSB)
- Best blocker: Ma. Paulina Soriano (AdU)
- Best setter: April Linor Jose (FEU)
- Best digger: Stephanie Gabriel (Ateneo)
- Best server: Cherry Mae Vivas (FEU)
- Best receiver: Lizlee Ann Gata (Adamson)
- Conference MVP: Aiza Maizo (UST)
- Finals MVP: Aiza Maizo (UST)

== Starting line-ups ==
School	Setter	Middle	Open	Utility	Middle	Open	Libero
Adamson	Lourdes Patilano	Angelica Quinlog	Jill Gustillo	Charmaine Moralde*	Paulina Soriano	Angela Benting	Lizlee Ann Gata
Ateneo	Jamenea Ferrer	Ma. Rosario Soriano*	Angeline Gervacio	Ma. Carmina Denise Acevedo	Bea Charmaine Pascual	Fille Saint Cainglet	Stephanie Gabriel
Benilde	Renilyne Kara Agero	Zharmaine Velez	Rosanne Fajardo*	LC Girlie Quemada	Giza Yumang	Katty Kwan	Arianne Yap
FEU	April Linor Jose	Cherry May Vivas	Rachel Daquis*	Monique Tiangco	Shaira Gonzalez	Mary Rose Cabanag	Rose Anne Taganas
Lyceum	Nicolette Tabafunda	Nasella Nica Guliman	Syvie Gay Aratates	Jamie Peña	Christina Casanova	Joy Gazelle Cases	Joanna Marie dela Peña
San Sebastian	Jennelyn Belen	Princess Ellaine Cruz	Jinni Mondejar*	Analyn Joy Benito	Melissa Mirasol	Margarita Pepito	Marie Pierre Quegley
UST	Rhea Dimaculangan; Sarah Jane Gonzales	Maika Angela Ortiz; Dindin Santiago	Maria Angeli Tabaquero	Aiza Maizo	Hannah Mance; Roxanne Pimentel*	Maruja Banaticla	Jennifer Fortuno; Katrina Carangan; Jessica Curato
UP	Denise Data	Aileen Quejas	Michelle Tagudin*	Pauline Genido	Carmina Teresita Barcelon	Southlyn Ramos	Amanda Isada
