= Mika Reyes =

Filipino volleyball player (born 1994)

Personal information
- Full name: Mika Aereen Marcaliñas Reyes
- Nicknames: Yeye, Mika
- Born: June 21, 1994 (age 32)
- Home town: Pulilan, Bulacan, Philippines
- Education: De La Salle University
- Height: 183 cm (6 ft 0 in)
- Weight: 63 kg (139 lb)
- Spike: 279 cm (110 in)
- Block: 267 cm (105 in)

Volleyball information
- Position: Middle Hitter
- Current club: PLDT
- Number: 3

Career
- Years: Team
- 2015: Meralco Power Spikers
- 2016: F2 Logistics Cargo Movers
- 2017–2019: Petron Blaze Spikers
- 2020–2021: Sta. Lucia Lady Realtors
- 2022–present: PLDT High Speed Hitters

National team
- Years: Team
- 2017–2019: Philippines
- Updated on May 2023

Mika Aereen Marcaliñas Reyes (born June 21, 1994) is a Filipino volleyball player. She is a middle hitter/blocker and is currently playing for PLDT High Speed Hitters in the Premier Volleyball League.

== Personal life ==
Reyes grew up in Pulilan, Bulacan. Her family owns a resort in their hometown. She finished her high school studies at St. Scholastica's College, Manila. She then got recruited and enrolled to De La Salle University. She took up AB Psychology and graduated in 2016.

Reyes was previously in a relationship with basketball player Kiefer Ravena from 2014 until 2015 and with actor Jerome Ponce from 2017 until 2020.

== Career ==
Reyes was named Best Attacker at the 2013 PVF Intercollegiate Volleyball Championship and Most Valuable Player in the 2015 edition. Reyes won the 2014 Philippine National Games Best Blocker award, and was the 1st Best Middle Blocker in its 2015 edition. She was part of the DLSU Lady Spikers champion teams of UAAP Season 74, Season 75, and Season 78. Playing under F2 Logistics, she was named as the brand ambassador of the Philippine Super Liga for its 2016 season. On July 28, 2016, Reyes was selected as the 7th and final volleyball player to join the Philippine special representative team to compete in the 2016 FIVB Volleyball Women's Club World Championship.

On January 11, 2017, Reyes signed a two-year deal with the Petron Blaze Spikers.

She was a member of the PSL selections that competed in the 2016 FIVB Volleyball Women's Club World Championship, the 2017 Asian Women's Club Volleyball Championship in Kazakhstan, and the 2017 Annual H.R.H. Princess Maha Chakri Sirindhorn's Cup in Thailand, where they won the bronze medal.

Reyes was named team captain of the Philippine women's volleyball national team in May 2017. The team competed in the 2017 Asian Championship, and the 2017 Southeast Asian Games in Malaysia.

With Petron Blaze Spikers, Reyes won the 2017 PSL Invitational Cup silver medal, the 2017 PSL All-Filipino Conference gold medal with the Second Best Middle Blocker award, and silver medal in the 2017 Philippine Super Liga Grand Prix Conference with the First Best Middle Blocker award.

Reyes has played for the Sta. Lucia Lady Realtors from 2020 to 2021, and now plays for the PLDT High Speed Hitters.

== Clubs ==
- (Philippines) Meralco Power Spikers (2015)
- (Philippines) F2 Logistics Cargo Movers (2016)
- (Philippines) Petron Blaze Spikers (2017–2019)
- (Philippines) Sta. Lucia Lady Realtors (2020–2021)
- (Philippines) PLDT High Speed Hitters (2022–present)

== Awards ==
=== Individuals ===
- 2013 PVF Intercollegiate Championship "Best Attacker"
- 2014 Philippine National Games "Best Blocker"
- 2015 Philippine National Games "1st Best Middle Blocker"
- 2015 PVF Intercollegiate Championship "Most Valuable Player"
- 2017 PSL All-Filipino "2nd Best Middle Blocker"
- 2017 PSL Grand Prix "1st Best Middle Blocker"
- 2018 PSL Grand Prix "2nd Best Middle Blocker"
- 2018 Philippine Super Liga Invitational Cup "1st Best Middle Blocker"
- 2022 Premier Volleyball League Invitational Conference "1st Best Middle Blocker"
- 2025 Premier Volleyball League on Tour "Finals MVP"

=== Recognitions ===
- 2017 DLSAA Lasallian Sports Achievement Award
- 2016 Philippine Super Liga Ambassadress
- 2016 Philippine Sports Association Miss Volleyball

=== Collegiate ===
- UAAP Season 74 volleyball tournaments – Champions, with La Salle Lady Spikers
- UAAP Season 75 volleyball tournaments – Champions, with La Salle Lady Spikers
- UAAP Season 76 volleyball tournaments – Silver medal, with La Salle Lady Spikers
- UAAP Season 77 volleyball tournaments – Silver medal, with La Salle Lady Spikers
- UAAP Season 78 volleyball tournaments – Champions, with La Salle Lady Spikers

=== Clubs ===
- 2016 Philippine Super Liga All-Filipino – Champion, with F2 Logistics Cargo Movers
- 2016 Philippine Super Liga Grand Prix – Bronze medal, with F2 Logistics Cargo Movers
- 2017 Philippine Super Liga Invitational – Silver medal, with Petron Blaze Spikers
- 2017 Philippine Super Liga All-Filipino – Champion, with Petron Blaze Spikers
- 2017 H.R.H. Princess Maha Chakri Sirindhorn's Cup – Bronze medal, with Philippine Super Liga All-Stars
- 2017 Philippine Super Liga Grand Prix – Silver medal, with Petron Blaze Spikers
- 2018 Philippine Super Liga All-Filipino – Champion, with Petron Blaze Spikers
- 2018 Philippine SuperLiga Grand Prix – Champion, with Petron Blaze Spikers
- 2018 Philippine Super Liga Invitational – Silver medal, with Petron Blaze Spikers
- 2019 Philippine SuperLiga Grand Prix – Champion, with Petron Blaze Spikers
- 2025 Premier Volleyball League on Tour – Champion, with PLDT High Speed Hitters
- 2025 Premier Volleyball League Invitationals - Champion, with PLDT High Speed Hitters
