= 2018 Philippine Super Liga Grand Prix =

First indoor conference of the 2018 Philippine Super Liga season

- Duration: February 17 – May 5, 2018
- Teams: 8
- TV partner(s): ESPN 5, AksyonTV, Hyper, ESPN5.com

Results
- Champions: Petron Blaze Spikers
- Runners-up: F2 Logistics Cargo Movers
- Third place: Foton Tornadoes Blue Energy
- Fourth place: Cocolife Asset Managers

Awards
- MVP: Lindsay Stalzer
- Best OH: Sara Klisura; María José Pérez
- Best MB: Aby Maraño; Mika Reyes
- Best OPP: Elizabeth Ann Wendel; Kennedy Lynne Bryan
- Best Setter: Kim Fajardo
- Best Libero: Minami Yoshioka; Katarina Vukomanović

PSL Grand Prix chronology
- < 2017 2019 >

PSL conference chronology
- < 2017 Grand Prix 2018 Invitational >
- 2018 BVCC >

The 2018 Philippine Super Liga Grand Prix (also known as the 2018 Chooks-to-Go Philippine Super Liga Grand Prix due to sponsorship reasons) was the first conference of the 2018 season of the Philippine Super Liga (PSL) and the sixth running of the Grand Prix. The tournament ran from February 17 to May 5, 2018, with the formal opening ceremony was held on February 24 at the Santa Rosa Sports Complex in Santa Rosa, Laguna.

The tournament was moved from October to February in order to align with the new competition calendar approved by the International Volleyball Federation (FIVB) and the Asian Volleyball Confederation (AVC).

The league returned to an eight-team lineup with the Smart Prepaid Giga Hitters making their debut, replacing the Iriga City Oragons. In a rematch of the previous two finals, the Petron Blaze Spikers reclaimed the title against the F2 Logistics Cargo Movers for their fourth PSL championship.

== Teams ==
2018 Philippine Super Liga Grand Prix
Abbr.	Team	Affiliation	Head coach	Team captain	Imports
CIG	Cignal HD Spikers	Cignal TV, Inc.	(Philippines) Edgar Barroga	(Philippines) Rachel Daquis	(United States) Jeane Horton (Bosnia and Herzegovina) Sonja Milanović
CCL	Cocolife Asset Managers	United Coconut Planters Life Assurance Corporation	(Serbia) Moro Branislav	(Serbia) Sara Klisura	(United States) Taylor Milton (withdrew) (Serbia) Sara Klisura (Serbia) Marta Drpa
F2L	F2 Logistics Cargo Movers	F2 Global Logistics Inc.	(Philippines) Arnold Laniog	(Philippines) Cha Cruz-Behag	(United States) Kennedy Lynne Bryan (Venezuela) María José Pérez (Japan) Minami Yoshioka
FOT	Foton Tornadoes Blue Energy	United Asia Automotive Group, Inc.	(Philippines) Rommel Abella	(Philippines) Dindin Santiago-Manabat	(United States) Brooke Kranda (withdrew) (Canada) Elizabeth Wendel (Serbia) Katarina Vukomanović (Trinidad and Tobago) Channon Thompson
GAL	Generika–Ayala Lifesavers	Actimed, Inc.	(Philippines) Sherwin Meneses	(Philippines) Angeli Pauline Araneta	(Trinidad and Tobago) Darlene Ramdin (United States) Symone Hayden (Mexico) Kimberly Gutierrez
PET	Petron Blaze Spikers	Petron Corporation	(Philippines) Shaq Delos Santos	(United States) Lindsay Stalzer	(United States) Hillary Hurley (withdrew) (United States) Lindsay Stalzer (Japan) Yuri Fukuda (United States) Khat Bell
SMA	Smart Prepaid Giga Hitters	Smart Communications	(Philippines) Ronald Dulay	(Philippines) Janet Serafica	(Cuba) Gyselle Silva (Serbia) Sanja Trivunović
SLR	Sta. Lucia Lady Realtors	Sta. Lucia Realty and Development Corporation	(Philippines) George Pascua	(Philippines) Pamela Tricia Lastimosa	(Ukraine) Bohdana Anisova (Canada) Kristen Moncks (Canada) Marisa Field

== Preliminary round ==
=== Team standings ===
Pos	Team	Pld	W	L	Pts	SW	SL	SR	SPW	SPL	SPR
1	F2 Logistics Cargo Movers	10	9	1	27	28	6	4.667	823	649	1.268
2	Petron Blaze Spikers	10	9	1	25	27	12	2.250	876	783	1.119
3	Cocolife Asset Managers	10	6	4	18	21	17	1.235	837	822	1.018
4	Foton Tornadoes	10	5	5	16	20	21	0.952	907	918	0.988
5	Sta. Lucia Lady Realtors	10	5	5	14	20	19	1.053	876	865	1.013
6	Cignal HD Spikers	10	3	7	9	14	23	0.609	829	844	0.982
7	Generika–Ayala Lifesavers	10	3	7	8	14	25	0.560	769	897	0.857
8	Smart Prepaid Giga Hitters	10	0	10	3	9	30	0.300	785	924	0.850

- All times are in Philippines Standard Time (UTC+08:00)

=== First round ===
Date	Time		Score		Set 1	Set 2	Set 3	Set 4	Set 5	Total	Report
17 Feb	14:00	Generika–Ayala Lifesavers	1–3	Foton Tornadoes Blue Energy	19–25	25–22	16–25	22–25		82–97	P–2
17 Feb	16:00	Sta. Lucia Lady Realtors	1–3	Petron Blaze Spikers	21–25	25–18	17–25	20–25		83–93	P–2
20 Feb	16:15	Sta. Lucia Lady Realtors	3–2	Generika–Ayala Lifesavers	21–25	25–21	23–25	25–15	15–7	109–93	P–2
20 Feb	19:00	Cocolife Asset Managers	0–3	Cignal HD Spikers	15–25	26–28	15–25			56–78	P–2
24 Feb	14:00	Cignal HD Spikers	1–3	Petron Blaze Spikers	17–25	25–8	20–25	17–25		79–83	P–2
24 Feb	16:00	F2 Logistics Cargo Movers	3–0	Cocolife Asset Managers	25–21	25–15	25–16			75–52	P–2
27 Feb	16:15	Smart Prepaid Giga Hitters	0–3	Cocolife Asset Managers	20–25	22–25	13–25			55–75	P–2
27 Feb	19:00	Cignal HD Spikers	3–2	Foton Tornadoes Blue Energy	25–22	25–23	26–28	20–25	15–11	111–109	P–2
01 Mar	16:15	Petron Blaze Spikers	3–0	Smart Prepaid Giga Hitters	25–12	25–14	25–17			75–43	P–2
01 Mar	19:00	Sta. Lucia Lady Realtors	1–3	Cocolife Asset Managers	25–23	21–25	19–25	16–25		81–98	P–2
03 Mar	16:00	Foton Tornadoes Blue Energy	0–3	Cocolife Asset Managers	19–25	22–25	18–25			59–75	P–2
03 Mar	18:00	F2 Logistics Cargo Movers	1–3	Petron Blaze Spikers	25–20	19–25	19–25	19–25		82–95	P–2
06 Mar	16:00	Generika–Ayala Lifesavers	0–3	Petron Blaze Spikers	21–25	15–25	21–25			57–75	P–2
06 Mar	18:00	Smart Prepaid Giga Hitters	2–3	Foton Tornadoes Blue Energy	25–21	20–25	29–27	15–25	12–15	101–113	P–2
08 Mar	16:15	Smart Prepaid Giga Hitters	0–3	F2 Logistics Cargo Movers	22–25	18–25	17–25			57–75	P–2
08 Mar	19:00	Sta. Lucia Lady Realtors	3–0	Cignal HD Spikers	32–30	25–22	25–21			82–73	P–2
10 Mar	14:00	Cocolife Asset Managers	3–1	Generika–Ayala Lifesavers	25–19	25–16	21–25	25–17		96–77	P–2
10 Mar	16:00	Foton Tornadoes Blue Energy	2–3	Petron Blaze Spikers	25–14	16–25	25–22	18–25	13–15	97–101	P–2
13 Mar	16:15	Generika–Ayala Lifesavers	3–2	Smart Prepaid Giga Hitters	25–21	25–23	23–25	22–25	15–11	110–105	P–2
13 Mar	19:00	Sta. Lucia Lady Realtors	1–3	F2 Logistics Cargo Movers	25–18	16–25	19–25	21–25		81–93	P–2
15 Mar	16:15	F2 Logistics Cargo Movers	3–0	Cignal HD Spikers	25–21	25–17	25–14			75–52	P–2
15 Mar	19:00	Petron Blaze Spikers	3–1	Cocolife Asset Managers	26–24	25–18	21–25	25–20		97–87	P–2
17 Mar	13:45	Foton Tornadoes Blue Energy	1–3	F2 Logistics Cargo Movers	18–25	25–23	20–25	16–25		79–98	P–2
17 Mar	16:10	Cignal HD Spikers	3–0	Smart Prepaid Giga Hitters	25–21	25–18	25–20			75–59	P–2
20 Mar	16:15	Sta. Lucia Lady Realtors	3–1	Smart Prepaid Giga Hitters	25–15	25–20	23–25	25–22		98–82	P–2
20 Mar	19:00	Generika–Ayala Lifesavers	0–3	F2 Logistics Cargo Movers	18–25	16–25	12–25			46–75	P–2
22 Mar	16:15	Generika–Ayala Lifesavers	3–2	Cignal HD Spikers	26–24	18–25	16–25	25–22	15–11	100–107	P–2
22 Mar	19:00	Foton Tornadoes Blue Energy	3–1	Sta. Lucia Lady Realtors	25–18	22–25	25–20	28–26		100–89	P–2

=== Second round ===
Date	Time		Score		Set 1	Set 2	Set 3	Set 4	Set 5	Total	Report
24 Mar	16:00	Petron Blaze Spikers	3–1	Smart Prepaid Giga Hitters	25–22	22–25	25–18	26–24		98–89	P–2
24 Mar	19:00	F2 Logistics Cargo Movers	3–0	Generika–Ayala Lifesavers	25–22	25–14	25–10			75–46	P–2
03 Apr	16:15	Foton Tornadoes Blue Energy	3–1	Cignal HD Spikers	25–23	27–25	21–25	32–30		105–103	P–2
03 Apr	19:00	Cocolife Asset Managers	3–1	Sta. Lucia Lady Realtors	25–20	25–18	20–25	25–22		95–85	P–2
05 Apr	16:15	Petron Blaze Spikers	0–3	Sta. Lucia Lady Realtors	18–25	21–25	17–25			56–75	P–2
05 Apr	19:00	F2 Logistics Cargo Movers	3–1	Cignal HD Spikers	23–25	27–25	25–16	25–23		100–89	P–2
07 Apr	16:00	Foton Tornadoes Blue Energy	3–1	Generika–Ayala Lifesavers	25–21	25–17	21–25	25–20		96–83	P–2
07 Apr	18:00	Cocolife Asset Managers	3–2	Smart Prepaid Giga Hitters	25–23	25–21	25–27	19–25	16–14	110–110	P–2
10 Apr	16:15	Petron Blaze Spikers	3–2	Cocolife Asset Managers	25–14	23–25	15–25	25–14	15–13	103–91	
10 Apr	19:00	F2 Logistics Cargo Movers	3–0	Foton Tornadoes Blue Energy	25–17	25–18	25–17			75–52	
12 Apr	16:15	Cignal HD Spikers	0–3	Generika–Ayala Lifesavers	22–25	20–25	20–25			62–75	
12 Apr	19:00	Sta. Lucia Lady Realtors	3–1	Smart Prepaid Giga Hitters	25–22	18–25	25–17	25–18		93–82	

== Playoffs ==
Quarter-finals; One-game playoff
FOT	1
SLR	0
FTL	1
SMA	0
PET	1
GAL	0
CCL	1
CIG	0

Semi-finals; Best-of-3 series
FOT	0
FTL	2
PET	2
CCL	0

Finals; Best-of-three series
FTL	1
PET	2
Bronze medal match
CCL	0
FOT	1

=== Quarterfinals ===
Date	Time		Score		Set 1	Set 2	Set 3	Set 4	Set 5	Total	Report
14 Apr	16:00	F2 Logistics Cargo Movers	3–0	Smart Prepaid Giga Hitters	25–18	25–18	27–25			77–61	P–2
14 Apr	18:00	Petron Blaze Spikers	3–0	Generika–Ayala Lifesavers	25–19	25–20	25–21			75–60	P–2
17 Apr	16:15	Cocolife Asset Managers	3–0	Cignal HD Spikers	25–22	25–21	28–26			78–69	P–2
17 Apr	19:00	Foton Tornadoes Blue Energy	3–0	Sta. Lucia Lady Realtors	25–22	25–23	25–19			75–64	P–2

=== Semifinals ===
Best-of-three series

Date	Time		Score		Set 1	Set 2	Set 3	Set 4	Set 5	Total	Report
24 Apr	16:15	Petron Blaze Spikers	3–1	Cocolife Asset Managers	25–18	23–25	25–16	25–23		98–82	P–2
24 Apr	19:00	F2 Logistics Cargo Movers	3–1	Foton Tornadoes Blue Energy	25–22	25–23	22–25	25–22		97–92	P–2
26 Apr	16:15	F2 Logistics Cargo Movers	3–0	Foton Tornadoes Blue Energy	25–19	25–18	25–21			75–58	P–2
26 Apr	19:00	Petron Blaze Spikers	3–0	Cocolife Asset Managers	25–15	25–15	25–16			75–46	P–2

=== Bronze match ===
Date	Time		Score		Set 1	Set 2	Set 3	Set 4	Set 5	Total	Report
01 May	16:15	Cocolife Asset Managers	1–3	Foton Tornadoes Blue Energy	25–21	22–25	24–26	19–25		90–97	P–2

=== Finals ===
Best-of-three series

Date	Time		Score		Set 1	Set 2	Set 3	Set 4	Set 5	Total	Report
01 May	19:00	F2 Logistics Cargo Movers	2–3	Petron Blaze Spikers	25–23	25–20	15–25	22–25	9–15	96–108	
03 May	19:00	Petron Blaze Spikers	0–3	F2 Logistics Cargo Movers	17–25	22–25	19–25			58–75	P–2
05 May	18:00	F2 Logistics Cargo Movers	1–3	Petron Blaze Spikers	19–25	20–25	25–22	18–25		82–97	

== Final standing ==
Rank	Team
1st place, gold medalist(s)	Petron Blaze Spikers
2nd place, silver medalist(s)	F2 Logistics Cargo Movers
3rd place, bronze medalist(s)	Foton Tornadoes Blue Energy
4	Cocolife Asset Managers
5	Sta. Lucia Lady Realtors
6	Cignal HD Spikers
7	Generika–Ayala Lifesavers
8	Smart Prepaid Giga Hitters

2018 PSL Grand Prix Champions
Petron Blaze Spikers
Team roster
Lindsay Stalzer (Captain)/(Import), Yuri Fukuda (Libero)/(Import), Khat Bell (Import), Mika Reyes, Angelica Legacion, Frances Molina, Aiza Maizo-Pontillas, Mary Remy Joy Palma, Rhea Dimaculangan, Chlodia Eiriel Ysabella Cortez, Luthgarda Malaluan, Carmela Tunay, Princess Ira Gaiser (Libero), Cesael delos Santos (Head Coach)

== Individual awards ==
Award		Name/Team
MVP		(United States) Lindsay Stalzer (Petron)
Best Outside Spiker	1st:	(Serbia) Sara Klisura (Cocolife)
Best Outside Spiker	2nd:	(Venezuela) María José Pérez (F2 Logistics)
Best Middle Blocker	1st:	(Philippines) Abigail Maraño (F2 Logistics)
Best Middle Blocker	2nd:	(Philippines) Mika Reyes (Petron)
Best Opposite Spiker	1st:	(Canada) Elizabeth Ann Wendel (Foton)
Best Opposite Spiker	2nd:	(United States) Kennedy Lynne Bryan (F2 Logistics)
Best Setter		(Philippines) Kim Fajardo (F2 Logistics)
Best Libero	1st:	(Japan) Minami Yoshioka (F2 Logistics)
Best Libero	2nd:	(Serbia) Katarina Vukomanović (Foton)
Best Scorer in a Match		(Cuba) Gyselle de la Caridad Silva (Smart), 56 points

== Venues ==
Main venues

- Ynares Sports Arena
- Filoil Flying V Centre
- Smart Araneta Coliseum (finals)

"Spike on Tour" venues

- Sta. Rosa Multipurpose Complex - Santa Rosa, Laguna (opening ceremonies)
- Strike Gymnasium - Bacoor, Cavite
- Muntinlupa Sports Complex - Muntinlupa
- Malolos Sports and Convention Center - Malolos, Bulacan
- Imus Sports Complex - Imus, Cavite
- Batangas Sports and Convention Center - Batangas City, Batangas
- Baliwag Sports Center - Baliwag, Bulacan
- Centennial Arena Laoag Coliseum - Laoag City, Ilocos Norte
- Gen. Trias Sports Complex - General Trias, Cavite

== Broadcast partners ==
- ESPN 5: AksyonTV, Hyper (SD and HD), ESPN5.com
