= Aiza Maizo-Pontillas =

Filipino volleyball player (born 1988)

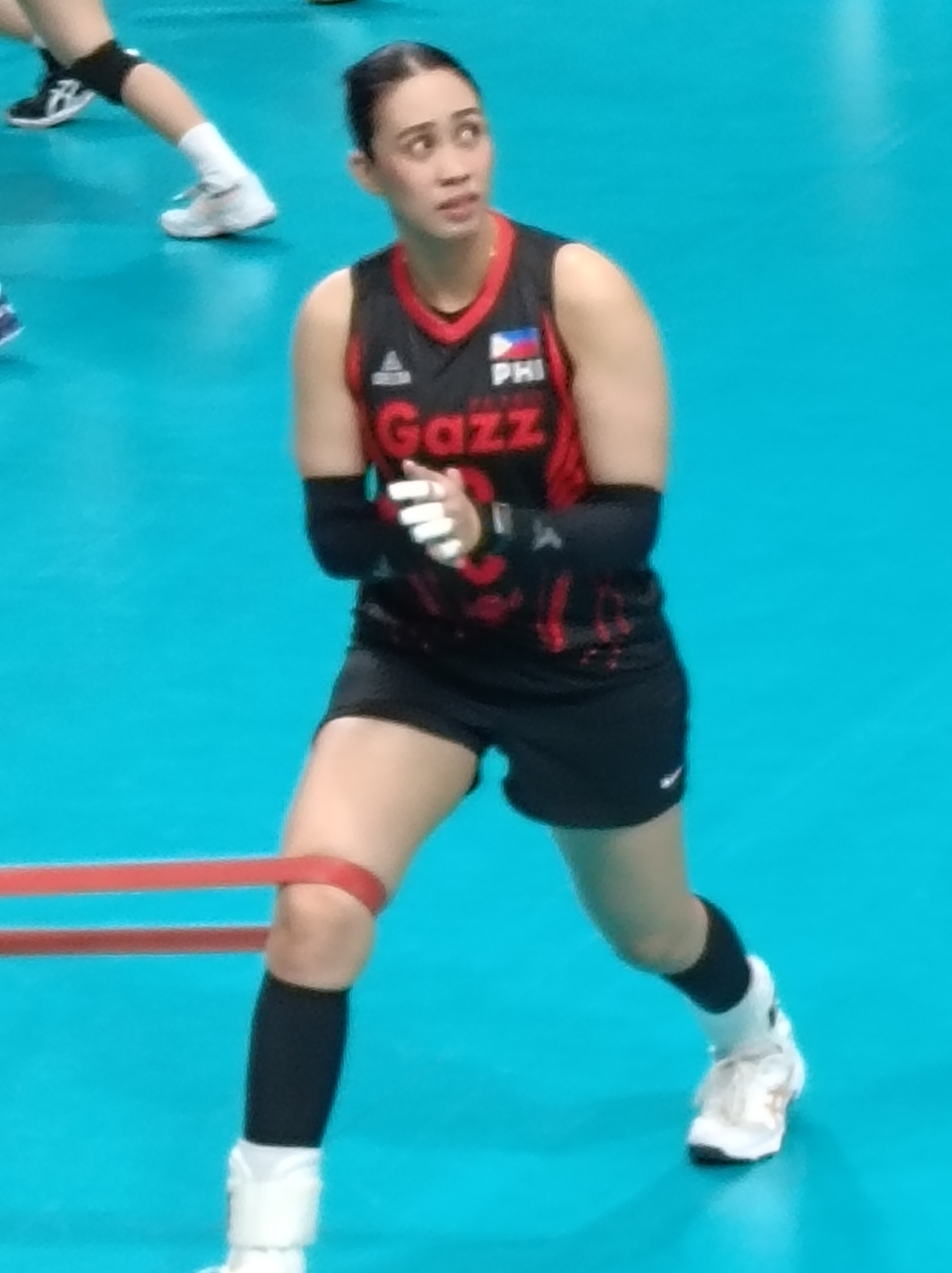
- Aiza Maizo-Pontillas in 2025

Personal information
- Nickname: Aiza, Nang
- Nationality: Filipino
- Born: February 29, 1988 (age 38)
- Hometown: Passi City, Iloilo, Philippines
- Height: 178 cm (5 ft 10 in)
- Weight: 69 kg (152 lb)
- Spike: 280 cm (110 in)
- Block: 275 cm (108 in)
- Education: University of Santo Tomas

Volleyball information
- Position: Opposite spiker
- Current club: Galeries Tower Highrisers

Career
Years	Teams
2011	Philippine Air Force
2011	Philippine Navy
2013	Petron
2013–2015	Cagayan Valley Lady Rising Suns
2015	PLDT Home Ultera Ultra Fast Hitters
2016–2020	Petron Blaze Spikers
2021	Sta. Lucia Lady Realtors
2022–2025	Petro Gazz Angels
2026–present	Galeries Tower Highrisers

National team
2013–2023	Philippines
Honours
Women's volleyball
Representing Philippines
ASEAN Grand Prix
Bronze medal – third place	2019 Nakhon Ratchasima	Philippine Team

Aiza Maizo-Pontillas (born February 29, 1988) is a Filipina professional volleyball player for the Galeries Tower Highrisers of the Premier Volleyball League (PVL).

In college, Maizo played for the UST Golden Tigresses, where she serves as team captain of the España-based squad. She won two titles with UST in UAAP seasons 69 (2007) and 72 (2010).

In semi-professional club volleyball, she won a total of 12 championships, eight in the Shakey's V-League and four in the Philippine Super Liga. Across both leagues, she was a three-time MVP and three-time Finals MVP on top of numerous skill-based and positional awards, including five for Best Opposite Spiker. In the SVL, she is the first player to win both MVP awards in a single conference twice, doing so in the 2009 Second Conference and 2014 Reinforced Open Conference.

In 2021, Maizo-Pontillas made her professional debut in the Premier Volleyball League with the Sta. Lucia Lady Realtors. In 2022, she moved to the Petro Gazz Angels where she would win three league titles throughout her tenure and earned an All-Premier Team selection for Best Opposite Spiker in the 2024 All-Filipino Conference. She also won the 2024 PNVF Champions League for Women with Petro Gazz. In 2026, she moved to the Galeries Tower Highrisers.

She was also a former member of the Philippines women's national volleyball team.

== Education ==
Graduated in Passi National High School

Maizo graduated from the University of Santo Tomas with a Bachelor of Science in Food Technology.

== Volleyball career ==
=== Collegiate career ===
Maizo started her collegiate volleyball career as a back-up setter of the UST Golden Tigresses in UAAP Season 68 volleyball, where they finished 4th place. In UAAP Season 69 volleyball, she transitioned into an Opposite Hitter by Coach August Sta. Maria of UST. UST gets its 15th championship title, her first championship as a player in UAAP. She came back in UAAP Season 71 volleyball as team captain and led UST into a Bronze finish. She was awarded as “Best Attacker” of the season.

In UAAP Season 72 volleyball, Maizo and the rest of UST Golden Tigresses defeated De La Salle University and hailed as UAAP Champions, her second championship title and UST’s 16th championship title in UAAP. On her last playing year in UAAP, Maizo received “Best Scorer” and “Best Receiver” awards and led UST into finals appearance but ended her collegiate career with a silver medal losing to arch-rival De La Salle University in UAAP Season 73 volleyball.

Maizo was a part of the 5 championship titles of UST in Shakey's V-League.She and the UST Golden Tigresses hailed as back to back champions in V-League 4th Season 1st Conference and V-League 4th Season 2nd Conference against arch-rivals, San Sebastian College-Recoletos. In V-League 5th Season 2nd Conference, UST loss to SSC-R in finals, Maizo bagged the “Best Server” of the season.

She also led the UST Golden Tigresses into a 3-peat championship. In V-League 6th Season 1st Conference, UST grabbed the championship against San Sebastian College-Recoletos and she was awarded as the “Best Blocker” of the conference. UST later on won the V-League 6th Season 2nd Conference against Adamson University and she was hailed the firs player to be awarded with both “Conference MVP” and “Finals MVP” in the same conference. Maizo again led UST into a championship in V-League 7th Season 1st Conference and won the “Best Attacker” and “Finals MVP” awards.

=== Semi-Professional Career ===
Maizo-Pontillas had a short stint with Philippine Air Force and Philippine Navy as a guest player in Shakey’s V-League 8th Season Open Conference. She placed 4th with the Philippine Navy team.

She returned from a long volleyball hiatus in Shakey's V-League 10th Season 1st Conference where she played with UST Tigresses as a guest player. They settled with a bronze finish, losing to Ateneo Lady Eagles in the semi-finals and winning to Adamson Lady Falcons in the battle for bronze.

She then debuted with Cagayan Valley Lady Rising Suns in Shakey's V-League 10th Season 2nd Conference where they end up Champion as they swept the conference from elimination to finals with 16-0 record. They defeated Smart-Maynilad Net Spikers in the finals which both Game 1 and 2 ended up in 5 sets.

In Shakey's V-League 11th Season Open Conference, Maizo-Pontillas and Cagayan Valley Lady Rising Suns finished with a silver medal, losing to Philippine Army Lady Troopers in the finals. They avenged their defeat in Shakey's V-League 11th Season Reinforced Open Conference winning the championship against Philippine Army Lady Troopers. Maizo-Pontillas was hailed as “Finals MVP”, “Conference MVP”, and “Best Scorer”.

In Shakey's V-League 12th Season Open Conference, Maizo-Pontillas helped Cagayan Valley Lady Rising Suns to finish with a bronze medal. She later won Shakey's V-League 12th Season Reinforced Open Conference with PLDT Home Ultera Fast Hitters.

She played the 2016 PSL Invitational Cup with Petron Tri-Activ Spikers winning a silver medal and the “Best Opposite Spiker” individual award. She later on won another silver medal in 2016 PSL Grand Prix Conference and was awarded as “2nd Best Opposite Spiker”. She once again finished with a silver medal in 2017 PSL Invitational Cup.

Maizo-Pontillas won her first PSL title in 2017 PSL All-Filipino Conference with Petron Blaze Spikers, beating F2 Logistics Cargo Movers in the finals. She was awarded as the “Most Valuable Player” of the conference. In another title run with Petron Blaze Spikers, Maizo-Pontillas settled for a silver finish in 2017 PSL Grand Prix Conference.

The following year, she together with Stalzer, Katherine Bell and Rhea Dimaculangan led Petron to the 2018 PSL Grand Prix Conference championship. In 2018 PSL Invitational Cup, they finished with a silver finish losing to F2 Logistics Cargo Movers. Maizo-Pontillas was awarded the “Best Opposite Spiker”. She ended the 2018 conferences with Petron Blaze Spikers as a champion in 2018 PSL All-Filipino Conference. She was once again awarded the “Best Opposite Spiker”.

Maizo-Pontillas with Petron Blaze Spikers achieved back to back championship winning the 2019 PSL Grand Prix Conference against F2 Logistics Cargo Movers. They however failed to defend their title in 2019 PSL All-Filipino Conference losing to Cignal HD Spikers in the semi-finals. They settled with a bronze medal, beating Foton Tornadoes in a 5-setter match. She ended her PSL career with a silver medal finish in 2019 PSL Invitational Conference, with Petron Blaze Spikers losing to F2 Logistics Cargo Movers in the finals. She was awarded “Best Opposite Spiker” in the end of the tournament.

=== Professional career ===
Maizo-Pontillas debuted on Premier Volleyball League in 2021 Premier Volleyball League Open Conference with Sta. Lucia Lady Realtors. They failed to advance in semi-finals as they finished 5th in the end of the elimination round.

She later on moved to Petro Gazz Angels in 2022. As an Angel, she collected 3 golds from 2022 Premier Volleyball League Reinforced Conference, 2024–25 Premier Volleyball League All-Filipino Conference, and 2025 Premier Volleyball League Reinforced Conference; 2 silvers from 2022 Premier Volleyball League Open Conference and 2023 Premier Volleyball League First All-Filipino Conference; and 1 bronze from 2024 Premier Volleyball League All-Filipino Conference.

In 2026, Maizo-Pontillas transferred to Galeries Tower Highrisers following Petro Gazz Angels' leave of absence from Premier Volleyball League after seven seasons.

=== National team career ===
Maizo-Pontillas debuted in the National Team in 2013 Asian Women's Volleyball Championship. They finished 12th place out of 16 teams. She was sidelined from the national team set to compete in the 2015 SEA Games Women’s Volleyball, but she was later hired as assistant coach for the games. In 2016 Women's Volleyball Thai-Denmark Super League, they placed last, tied with Hong Kong. She competed again in 2017 Asian Women's Volleyball Championship where they finished 8th place out of 14 teams.

She grabbed her first international medal in the 2017 Princess Maja Chakri Sirindhorn's Cup where they end up with a bronze medal. Maizo-Pontillas then joined in 2018 Asian Women's Volleyball Cup where they settled for a 9th place finish out of 10 teams joined. She brought home another medal in 2019 ASEAN Grand Prix – First Leg where they won bronze, finishing 3rd in the round-robin out of 4 teams.

In 2019 SEA Games Women’s Volleyball, she was included in the roster as a player this time. They failed to reach a podium finish, losing to Indonesia in the bronze medal match. She represented Philippines once again in 2023 Asian Women's Volleyball Challenge Cup where they finished 7th place out of 11 teams.

== Awards ==
=== Club competitions ===
Premier Volleyball League

- Best Opposite Spiker: 2024 All-Filipino
- Medals:
  - Champions (3): 2022 Reinforced, 2024–25 All-Filipino, 2025 Reinforced
  - Runner-up: 2022 Open, 2023 First All-Filipino
  - Third place: 2024 All-Filipino

Philippine Super Liga

- Most Valuable Player: 2017 All-Filipino
- Best Opposite Spiker (4): 2016 Invitational, 2018 Invitational, 2018 All-Filipino, 2019 Invitational
- 2nd Best Opposite Spiker: 2016 Grand Prix
- Medals:
  - Champions (4): 2017 All-Filipino, 2018 Grand Prix, 2018 All-Filipino, 2019 Grand Prix
  - Runner-up: 2016 Invitational, 2016 Grand Prix, 2017 Invitational, 2017 Grand Prix, 2018 Invitational, 2019 Invitational
  - Third place: 2013 Invitational, 2019 All-Filipino

Shakey's V-League

- Most Valuable Player (2): 2009 Second Conference, 2014 Reinforced Open Conference
- Finals Most Valuable Player (3): 2009 Second Conference, 2010 First Conference, 2014 Reinforced Open Conference
- Best Scorer: 2014 Reinforced Open Conference
- Best Attacker: 2010 First Conference
- Best Blocker: 2009 First Conference
- Best Server: 2008 Second Conference
- Medals:
  - Champions (8): 2007 First Conference, 2007 Second Conference, 2009 First Conference, 2009 Second Conference, 2010 First Conference, 2013 Open Conference, 2014 Reinforced Open Conference, 2015 Reinforced Open Conference
  - Runner-up: 2008 Second Conference, 2014 Open Conference
  - Third place: 2013 First Conference, 2015 Open Conference

=== Collegiate competitions ===
UAAP women's volleyball

- Best Scorer (2): 2009 (Season 71), 2011 (Season 73)
- Best Attacker: 2009 (Season 71)
- Best Receiver: 2011 (Season 73)
- Medals:
  - Champions (2): 2007 (Season 69), 2010 (Season 72)
  - Runner-up: 2011 (Season 73)
  - Third place: 2009 (Season 71)

=== Domestic competitions ===
PNVF Champions League

- Medals:
  - Champions: 2024

Philippine National Games

- Medals:
  - Runner-up: 2013
  - Third place: 2014

Philippine University Games

- Medals:
  - Champions: 2009

Cagayan Friendship Games

- Medals:
  - Champions (2): 2013, 2014
  - Third place: 2015

=== International club competitions ===
Princess Maja Chakri Sirindhorn's Cup

- Medals:
  - : 2017

=== International competitions ===
ASEAN Grand Prix

- Medals:
  - : 2019 – First Leg
