= Rhea Dimaculangan =

Filipino volleyball player (born 1991)

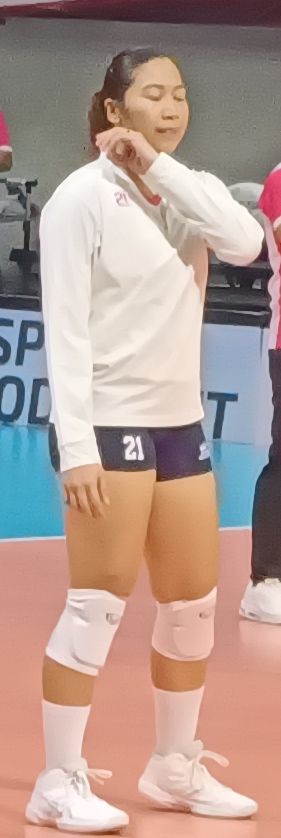
- Dimaculangan in 2025

Personal information
- Full name: Rhea Katrina Karla Dimaculangan-Villarete
- Nickname: Rhea, D-Mac, Kat
- Nationality: Filipino
- Born: March 21, 1991 (age 35); Batangas, Philippines
- Height: 1.70 m (5 ft 7 in)
- Weight: 66 kg (146 lb)
- Spike: 275 cm (108 in)
- Block: 270 cm (106 in)
- Education: University of Santo Tomas

Volleyball information
- Position: Setter
- Current club: Creamline Cool Smashers
- Number: 12 and 21 (club), 19 (national team)

Career
Years	Teams
2014	RC Cola Air Force Raiders
2015	Philippine Air Force
2015–2017	Foton Tornadoes
2017–2019	Petron Blaze Spikers
2020	Generika-Ayala Lifesavers
2021–2024	PLDT Home Fibr Power Hitters
2021	Rebisco Philippines
2025	Creamline Cool Smashers

National team
2014–2021	Philippines
- Last updated: December 2023

Rhea Katrina Karla Dimaculangan-Villarete (born March 21, 1991) is a Filipino former professional volleyball player. Villarete played setter for and was a former captain of the UST Golden Tigresses. She is also a former of the Philippines women's national team.

== Early life and education ==
Dimaculangan was born on March 21, 1991 in Batangas to a family of five siblings. She is the younger sister of Ray Karl Dimaculangan, also a volleyball player and used to play as a setter for the men's volleyball team of the UST Golden Spikers.

== Career ==
=== Beginnings ===
Dimaculangan started her career in volleyball early in her elementary days in De La Salle Lipa. She was originally a hitter for her team, and only transitioned into her current position in 5th grade.

=== Collegiate days ===
She moved in the University of Santo Tomas High School for her high school education where she became the playmaker for the girls' volleyball team. Later on, she pursued her tertiary education in University of Santo Tomas, majoring in Sports Science under UST-CRS, and continuing with the UST Golden Tigresses.

In 2009–2010, the UST Golden Tigresses achieved a historic "Grand Slam" after sweeping the major Philippine collegiate women's volleyball conferences. (Shakey's V-League Season 6 1st Conference and 2nd Conference, the 2009 University Games, and UAAP Season 72).

In UAAP Season 72 where her team won the championship, she claimed the Best Server and Final's Most Valuable Player award.

=== Post-graduate career ===
==== Shakey's V-League ====
Dimaculangan also made a name in several Shakey's V-League conferences. In Shakey's V-League Season 6 1st Conference, she was entitled the Final's Most Valuable Player and Best Setter. She also snatched the Best Setter award in Shakey's V- League Season 11, Open Conference.

==== Philippine Super Liga ====
Dimaculangan's debut in the Philippine Super Liga was in the 2014 Philippine Super Liga All-Filipino league where she snatched the Best Setter award and led her team, RC Cola Air Force Raiders, to a championship silver medal.

She then transferred to the club team Foton Tornadoes together with Maika Ortiz in mid-2015 where she brought the team into a first-runner up finish in the 2015 Philippine Super Liga All-Filipino. With the aid of the imports Lindsay Stalzer and Ariel Usher, she helped the team bag its second championship gold medal in the 2016 PSL Grand Prix Conference.

Early 2017, Dimaculangan moved clubs and signed a year contract with the Petron Tri-Activ Spikers. With Petron Blaze Spikers, she won the 2017 PSL Grand Prix Conference silver medal. The following year, she together with Lindsay Stalzer, Katherine Bell and Aiza Maizo-Pontillas led Petron to the 2018 PSL Grand Prix Conference championship. Villarete won the Most Valuable Player award of the 2018 PSL All-Filipino Conference. In 2020, Villarete signed with the Generika-Ayala Lifesavers.

==== Premier Volleyball League ====
In 2021, she joined the PLDT Home Fibr Power Hitters. In 2024, she left the team to focus on her family.

In 2025, Dimaculangan joined PVL club, Creamline Cool Smashers for their 2025 AVC Women's Volleyball Champions League stint. She later helped Creamline win the PVL on Tour tournament and Invitational Conference. Her last tournament was the Reinforced Conference where Creamline finished sixth. In January 2026, Dimaculangan announced her retirement from volleyball.

== Personal life ==
In 2024, Dimaculangan married her boyfriend, Raymond Jomarcel Villarete.

== Awards ==
=== Individuals ===
Philippine Super Liga

- Most Valuable Player: 2018 All-Filipino
- Best Setter (3): 2014 All-Filipino, 2017 All-Filipino, 2019 Grand Prix

Shakey's V-League

- Finals Most Valuable Player: 2009 First Conference
- Best Setter (2): 2009 First Conference, 2014 Open Conference

UAAP women's volleyball

- Finals Most Valuable Player: 2009 (Season 72)
- Best Server: 2009 (Season 72)

=== Collegiate ===
- 2007 UAAP Season 70 – 2nd Runner-Up, with UST Golden Tigresses
- 2008 Shakey's V-League 2nd Conference – 1st Runner-Up, with UST Golden Tigresses
- 2008 UAAP Season 71 – 2nd Runner-Up, with UST Golden Tigresses
- 2009 Shakey's V-League 1st Conference – Champion, with UST Golden Tigresses
- 2009 Shakey's V-League 2nd Conference – Champion, with UST Golden Tigresses
- 2009 Philippine University Games – Champion, with UST Golden Tigresses
- 2009 UAAP Season 72 – Champion, with UST Golden Tigresses
- 2010 Shakey's V-League 1st Conference – Champion, with UST Golden Tigresses
- 2010 UAAP Season 73 – 1st Runner-Up, with UST Golden Tigresses
- 2011 UAAP Season 74 – 2nd Runner-Up, with UST Golden Tigresses

=== Club ===
- 2016 Philippine Super Liga All-Filipino Conference – 1st Runner-up, with Foton Tornadoes
- 2016 Philippine Super Liga Grand Prix – Champion, with Foton Tornadoes
- 2017 Philippine Super Liga Invitational Cup – 1st Runner-up, with Petron Tri-Activ Spikers
- 2017 Philippine Super Liga All-Filipino Conference – Champion, with Petron Blaze Spikers
- 2017 Philippine Super Liga Grand Prix Conference – 1st Runner-up, with Petron Blaze Spikers
- 2018 Philippine Super Liga Grand Prix Conference – Champion, with Petron Blaze Spikers
- 2018 Philippine Super Liga All-Filipino Conference – Champion, with Petron Blaze Spikers
