= Maica Morada =

Filipino volleyball player (born 1988)

Mecaila Irish May Morada

Personal information
- Nickname: Maica
- Nationality: Filipino
- Born: 27 July 1988 (age 38)
- Hometown: Quezon City, Philippines
- Height: 5 ft 6 in (1.68 m)
- Weight: 50 kg (110 lb)
- Education: Far Eastern University

Volleyball information
- Position: Middle blocker
- Current club: Cignal HD Spikers
- Number: 1

Mecaila Irish May Morada (born July 27, 1988) is a Filipino volleyball athlete.

== Career ==
Morada was the UAAP Season 69 - Rookie of the Year. and the Season 71 Best Server. She played for Petron Blaze in the 2015 Asian Club Championship. and for the 2016 Philippine Super Liga Grand Prix Conference with Petron Tri-Activ Spikers

Morada was the team captain for the FEU Lady Spikers in the UAAP Season 74 and Petron Blaze Spikers for the PSL 2015 season.

== Clubs ==
- (Philippines) FEU Lady Spikers (2007–2014)
- (Philippines) Petron Tri-Activ Spikers (2015–2016)
- (Philippines) Cignal HD Spikers (2017)

== Awards ==
=== Individuals ===
Season	Tournament	Award	Ref
69	UAAP	Rookie of the Year	
71	UAAP	Best Server	
6	V-League 1st Conference	Best Server	
2016	PSL: Invitational Cup	2nd Best Middle Blocker	
2017	PSL: Invitational Cup	2nd Best Middle Blocker	
