= Frances Molina =

Filipino volleyball player

Personal information
- Full name: Frances Xinia Dionisio Molina
- Nickname: Ces
- Nationality: Filipino
- Born: September 23, 1994 (age 32)
- Hometown: Nueva Ecija, Philippines
- Height: 1.80 m (5 ft 11 in)
- Weight: 61 kg (134 lb)
- Spike: 280 cm (110 in)
- Block: 275 cm (108 in)
- Education: San Beda College

Volleyball information
- Position: Outside hitter

Career
Years	Teams
2013	PNP Lady Patrollers
2014–2021	Petron Blaze Spikers
2016	PSL All-Stars
2021	Petro Gazz Angels
2022–2024	Cignal HD Spikers
2025–present	Farm Fresh Foxies

National team
2015–2021	Philippines
Honours
Women's volleyball
Representing Philippines
Bronze medal – third place	2019 Nakhon Ratchasima	Team
Bronze medal – third place	2019 Santa Rosa	Team
- Last updated: July 2025

Frances Xinia Dionisio Molina (born September 23, 1994) is a Filipino volleyball player for the Farm Fresh Foxies of the Premier Volleyball League (PVL). She played with the Philippine Super Liga All-Stars in the 2016 FIVB Club World Championship. She is part of the Philippines women's national volleyball team.

== Early life ==
A native of Nueva Ecija, she was born (second to three siblings) to Araceli Harding (née Dionisio) and Pedro Molina with the former who later became estranged from the latter and married to an India-based to British engineering consultant. Harding was an open hitter playing for the Central Luzon State University volleyball team in the State Colleges and Universities Athletic Association (SCUAA). She was supposed to join the Philippine women's national volleyball team that will participate in the 1991 Southeast Asian Games, but it was discontinued due to earlier marriage, and her work in a company based in Macau.

Molina grew up in the town of Aliaga and moved to Cabanatuan to attend the Araullo University (later transferred to College of Immaculate Conception) for her secondary studies. She was more involved in athletics due to her father's connection with the sport initially uninterested in volleyball.

== Career ==
Molina started playing volleyball on her fourth year in high school. In 2008, she was recruited to be the part of the Cabanatuan's secondary girls' volleyball team for the Central Luzon Regional Athletics Association. She was scouted by George Sucaldito and Nemecio Gavino from the San Beda College.

She then became part of the college's women's volleyball team, the San Beda Lady Red Spikers. Molina along with Janine Marciano was part of the team that ended in the Final Four at NCAA Season 87 but her team struggled in the next season. Molina's team ended in the Final Four again in NCAA Season 89 but Molina's participation was disrupted by an injury which meant that she didn't finish the season.

She played for the PNP Lady Patrollers of the Shakey's V-League after she recovered from her injury. Molina was then recruited by the Petron Blaze Spikers of the Philippine Super Liga and was named 2nd Best Outside Hitter at the 2015 PSL All-Filipino Conference which was won by Petron.

Molina has also participated in internationally competing at the 2016 Thai-Denmark Super League 2016 as part of the Petron-Philippine Super Liga All-Stars. She was also named as part of the PSL Manila squad that will participate at the 2016 FIVB Volleyball Women's Club World Championship. With Petron Blaze Spikers, Molina won the 2017 PSL Grand Prix Conference silver medal. In 2017, she became part of the Philippines women's national volleyball team that competed in various tournaments like ASEAN Grand Prix and 2019 SEA Games.

In 2021, Molina signed to Petro Gazz Angels to play in the first season of Premier Volleyball League on its professional status.

== Awards ==
=== Individual ===
- 2012 NCAA Season 92 "Best blocker"
- 2015 Philippine Superliga Grand Prix "2nd Best Opposite Spiker"
- 2017 Philippine Superliga Invitational "1st Best Outside Spiker"
- 2021 PNVF Champions League for Women "1st Best Outside Spiker"
- 2022 Premier Volleyball League Open Conference "1st Best Outside Spiker"
- 2022 Premier Volleyball League Invitational Conference "2nd Best Outside Spiker"
- 2023 Premier Volleyball League Invitational Conference "Most Valuable Player (Conference)"

=== Clubs ===
- 2014 Philippine SuperLiga Grand Prix – Champions, with Petron Blaze Spikers
- 2015 Philippine SuperLiga Grand Prix – Runner-Up, with Petron Blaze Spikers
- 2016 Philippine SuperLiga Invitational – Runner-Up, with Petron Blaze Spikers
- 2016 Philippine SuperLiga Grand Prix – Runner-Up, with Petron Blaze Spikers
- 2017 Philippine SuperLiga All-Filipino – Champion, with Petron Blaze Spikers
- 2017 Philippine SuperLiga Grand Prix – Runner-Up, with Petron Blaze Spikers
- 2018 Philippine SuperLiga Grand Prix – Champions, with Petron Blaze Spikers
- 2018 Philippine SuperLiga Invitational – Runner-Up, with Petron Blaze Spikers
- 2018 Philippine SuperLiga All-Filipino – Champion, with Petron Blaze Spikers
- 2019 Philippine SuperLiga Grand Prix – Champions, with Petron Blaze Spikers
- 2019 Philippine SuperLiga All-Filipino – Bronze medal, with Petron Blaze Spikers
- 2019 Philippine SuperLiga Invitational – Runner-Up, with Petron Blaze Spikers
- 2021 Premier Volleyball League Open Conference – Bronze medal, with Petro Gazz Angels
- 2021 PNVF Champions League for Women - Bronze medal, with Petro Gazz Angels
- 2022 Premier Volleyball League Open Conference - Bronze medal, with Cignal HD Spikers
- 2022 Premier Volleyball League Invitational Conference - Bronze medal, with Cignal HD Spikers
- 2022 Premier Volleyball League Reinforced Conference - Runner-Up, with Cignal HD Spikers
- 2023 Premier Volleyball League Invitational Conference - Bronze medal, with Cignal HD Spikers
- 2023 Premier Volleyball League Second All-Filipino Conference - Bronze medal, with Cignal HD Spikers
- 2024 PNVF Champions League for Women - Silver medal, with Cignal HD Spikers
- 2024 PVL Reinforced Conference - Bronze medal, with Cignal HD Spikers
- 2024 PVL Invitational Conference - Silver medal, with Cignal HD Spikers
