= 2017 Philippine Super Liga Invitational Cup =

First indoor conference of the 2017 Philippine Super Liga season

- Duration: March 4 – April 1, 2017
- Teams: 7
- TV partner(s): TV5, AksyonTV, Sports5.ph

Results
- Champions: Kobe Shinwa Women's University; Cignal HD Spikers (co-champion)
- Third place: Petron Blaze Spikers
- Fourth place: Foton Tornadoes

Awards
- MVP: Jovelyn Gonzaga
- Best OH: Frances Molina; Rachel Daquis
- Best MB: Chihiro Fujiwara; Maica Morada
- Best OPP: Mary Grace Berte
- Best Setter: Chie Saet
- Best Libero: Angelique Dionela

PSL Invitational Cup chronology
- < 2016 2018 >

PSL conference chronology
- < 2016 Grand Prix 2017 All-Filipino >
- 2017 BVCC >

The 2017 Philippine Super Liga Invitational Cup (also known as the 2017 Belo Philippine Super Liga Invitational Cup due to sponsorship reasons) was the first conference of the 2017 season of the Philippine Super Liga (PSL) and the third running of the Invitational Cup. It began on March 4, 2017 and ended on April 1. The tournament adopted the all-to-play format to give playing time to every player in each team. This edition's guest team was Kobe Shinwa Women's University from Japan.

This tournament saw two debutants in the Cocolife Asset Managers and Sta. Lucia Lady Realtors, and the departures of the F2 Logistics Cargo Movers and Philippine Army Lady Troopers.

Similar to 2016, the league declared two co-champions. Kobe Shinwa were the tournament champions while the Cignal HD Spikers, the runners-up, were declared the co-champions. This would be the only women's title in Cignal's franchise history.

== Teams ==
2017 Philippine Super Liga Invitational Cup
Abbr.	Team	Affiliation	Head coach	Team captain
Local teams
CIG	Cignal HD Spikers	Cignal TV, Inc.	(Philippines) George Pascua	Stephanie Mercado
CCL	Cocolife Asset Managers	United Coconut Planters Life Assurance Corporation	(Philippines) Roberto Javier	Michele Gumabao
FOT	Foton Tornadoes	United Asia Automotive Group, Inc.	(Serbia) Moro Branislav	Dindin Santiago-Manabat
GEN	Generika–Ayala Lifesavers	Erikagen, Inc.	(Philippines) Francis Vicente	Geneveve Casugod
PET	Petron Blaze Spikers	Petron Corporation	(Philippines) Shaq Delos Santos	Frances Molina
SLR	Sta. Lucia Lady Realtors	Sta. Lucia Realty and Development Corporation	(Philippines) Michael Cariño	Djanel Cheng
Guest team
KSU	Kobe Shinwa Women's University	Kobe Shinwa Women's University	(Japan) Kiyokazu Yamamoto	Chihiro Fujiwara

== Format ==
Classification round

- The classification round was a single round-robin tournament involving the six PSL teams, with each team playing one match against all other teams in their pool for a total of five matches.
- The top three teams advanced to the final round while the remaining teams would play in the 5th–7th classification round.

5th–7th classification round

- The 5th–7th classification round was also a single round-robin, with each team playing a total of two matches.

Final round

- The final round was also a single round-robin, now featuring the international guest team. Each team played one match against all other teams for a total of three matches.

== Classification round ==
Pos	Team	Pld	W	L	Pts	SW	SL	SR	SPW	SPL	SPR	Qualification
1	Petron Blaze Spikers	5	5	0	14	15	4	3.750	441	369	1.195	Final round
2	Cignal HD Spikers	5	4	1	12	14	7	2.000	476	408	1.167	Final round
3	Foton Tornadoes	5	3	2	9	11	9	1.222	436	401	1.087	Final round
4	Generika–Ayala Lifesavers	5	2	3	6	9	10	0.900	415	423	0.981	5th–7th classification
5	Cocolife Asset Managers	5	1	4	3	5	13	0.385	356	422	0.844	5th–7th classification
6	Sta. Lucia Lady Realtors	5	0	5	1	4	15	0.267	351	452	0.777	5th–7th classification

Date	Time		Score		Set 1	Set 2	Set 3	Set 4	Set 5	Total	Report
04 March	15:00	Cocolife Asset Managers	1–3	Generika–Ayala Lifesavers	20–25	15–25	25–21	16–25		76–96	
04 March	17:00	Foton Tornadoes	2–3	Cignal HD Spikers	24–26	25–20	24–26	25–13	9–15	107–100	
04 March	19:00	Petron Blaze Spikers	3–0	Sta. Lucia Lady Realtors	25–19	25–19	25–21			75–59	
09 March	17:00	Cocolife Asset Managers	0–3	Foton Tornadoes	16–25	17–25	13–25			46–75	P2
09 March	19:00	Cignal HD Spikers	2–3	Petron Blaze Spikers	25–18	24–26	25–14	20–25	12–15	106–98	P2
11 March	15:00	Cignal HD Spikers	3–1	Sta. Lucia Lady Realtors	20–25	25–10	25–20	25–10		95–65	P2
11 March	17:00	Foton Tornadoes	3–1	Generika–Ayala Lifesavers	25–19	25–16	23–25	26–24		99–84	P2
11 March	19:00	Cocolife Asset Managers	1–3	Petron Blaze Spikers	25–20	19–25	21–25	21–25		86–95	P2
16 March	15:00	Petron Blaze Spikers	3–0	Foton Tornadoes	25–12	25–10	25–23			75–45	P2
16 March	17:00	Cocolife Asset Managers	3–1	Sta. Lucia Lady Realtors	22–25	25–17	25–23	25–16		97–81	P2
16 March	19:00	Generika–Ayala Lifesavers	1–3	Cignal HD Spikers	24–26	25–23	24–26	14–25		87–100	P2
18 March	17:00	Sta. Lucia Lady Realtors	0–3	Generika–Ayala Lifesavers	21–25	13–25	16–25			50–75	P2
18 March	19:00	Cocolife Asset Managers	0–3	Cignal HD Spikers	15–25	20–25	16–25			51–75	P2
23 March	17:00	Generika–Ayala Lifesavers	1–3	Petron Blaze Spikers	25–11	25–23	18–25	19–25		87–84	P2
23 March	19:00	Sta. Lucia Lady Realtors	2–3	Foton Tornadoes	19–25	25–23	16–25	25–22	11–15	96–110	P2

== 5th–7th classification round ==
Pos	Team	Pld	W	L	Pts	SW	SL	SR	SPW	SPL	SPR
1	Generika–Ayala Lifesavers	2	2	0	5	6	2	3.000	190	167	1.138
2	Cocolife Asset Managers	2	1	1	2	3	5	0.600	166	178	0.933
3	Sta. Lucia Lady Realtors	2	0	2	2	4	6	0.667	202	213	0.948

Date	Time		Score		Set 1	Set 2	Set 3	Set 4	Set 5	Total	Report
30 March	15:00	Generika–Ayala Lifesavers	3–2	Sta. Lucia Lady Realtors	25–19	23–25	25–27	25–18	15–12	113–101	P2
31 March	15:00	Sta. Lucia Lady Realtors	2–3	Cocolife Asset Managers	23–25	25–23	17–25	25–12	11–15	101–100	
01 April	13:00	Cocolife Asset Managers	0–3	Generika–Ayala Lifesavers	18–25	24–26	24–26			66–77	P2

== Final round ==
Pos	Team	Pld	W	L	Pts	SW	SL	SR	SPW	SPL	SPR
1	Kobe Shinwa Women's University	3	3	0	9	9	2	4.500	268	215	1.247
2	Cignal HD Spikers	3	2	1	6	6	4	1.500	234	216	1.083
3	Petron Blaze Spikers	3	1	2	3	5	7	0.714	258	278	0.928
4	Foton Tornadoes	3	0	3	0	2	9	0.222	219	270	0.811

Date	Time		Score		Set 1	Set 2	Set 3	Set 4	Set 5	Total	Report
30 March	17:00	Petron Blaze Spikers	1–3	Cignal HD Spikers	22–25	25–18	15–25	19–25		81–93	P2
30 March	19:00	Foton Tornadoes	1–3	Kobe Shinwa Women's University	25–15	22–25	25–18	25–12		97–70	P2
31 March	17:00	Petron Blaze Spikers	3–1	Foton Tornadoes	26–24	22–25	25–19	25–21		98–89	
31 March	19:00	Cignal HD Spikers	0–3	Kobe Shinwa Women's University	23–25	20–25	23–25			66–75	
01 April	15:00	Cignal HD Spikers	3–0	Foton Tornadoes	25–20	25–18	25–22			75–60	P2
01 April	17:00	Petron Blaze Spikers	1–3	Kobe Shinwa Women's University	17–25	19–25	25–21	18–25		79–96	P2

== Final standing ==
Rank	Team
1st place, gold medalist(s)	Kobe Shinwa Women's University; Cignal HD Spikers (co-champion)
3rd place, bronze medalist(s)	Petron Blaze Spikers
4	Foton Tornadoes
5	Generika–Ayala Lifesavers
6	Cocolife Asset Managers
7	Sta. Lucia Lady Realtors

2017 Philippine SuperLiga Invitational Cup
Kobe Shinwa Women's University
Team roster

Chihiro Fujiwara (c), Yoshimi Okada, Yuna Kato, Hana Kawabata, Wakana Harima, Yu Moriwaki, Kana Edamatsu, Hinano Michishita, Mariko Fujiwara, Yumeho Murakami, Nao Miyatake, Haruka Takabatake, Ruka Matsushima, Manaka Fukui
Head coach
Kiyokazu Yamamoto

Cignal HD Spikers
(co-champion)
Team roster

Maica Morada, Angelique Dionela, Stephanie Mercado (c), Mylene Paat, Jovelyn Gonzaga, Janine Marciano, Sandra delos Santos, Cherry Vivas, Lourdes Patilano, Rachel Daquis, May Jennifer Macatuno, Honey Royse Tubino, Marleen Cortel, Relea Ferina Saet
Head coach
George Pascua

=== Individual awards ===
Award		Name/Team
MVP		Jovelyn Gonzaga (Cignal)
Best Outside Spiker	1st:	Frances Xinia Molina (Petron)
Best Outside Spiker	2nd:	Rachel Daquis (Cignal)
Best Middle Blocker	1st:	Chihiro Fujiwara (KSWU)
Best Middle Blocker	2nd:	Maica Morada (Cignal)
Best Opposite Spiker		Mary Grace Berte (Foton)
Best Setter		Relea Ferina Saet (Cignal)
Best Libero		Angelique Dionela (Cignal)

== Venues ==
- Filoil Flying V Arena (main venue)
- Malolos Sports and Convention Center, Malolos, Bulacan
- Muntinlupa Sports Complex, Muntinlupa

== Broadcast partners ==
- Sports5: TV5, AksyonTV, Hyper (SD and HD), Sports5.ph
