= Stephanie Mercado =

Filipino volleyball player

Personal information
- Full name: Stephanie de Vega Mercado-de Koenigswarter
- Nickname: Paneng
- Nationality: Filipino
- Born: 1989 or 1990 (age 36–37)
- Home town: Quezon City
- Education: DLSU

Volleyball information
- Position: Outside hitter

Career
- Years: Team
- 2013: PCSO Bingo Milyonaryo Puffins
- 2013: Meralco Power Spikers
- 2014: AirAsia Flying Spikers
- 2014–2015: Meralco Power Spikers
- 2016: F2 Logistics Cargo Movers
- 2016–2017: Cignal HD Spikers
- 2018–2019: Petro Gazz Angels

Stephanie "Paneng" de Vega Mercado-de Koenigswarter is a Filipino former volleyball player.

== Early life and education ==
Stephanie Mercado was born in the 1989 or 1990 to Paulo Mercado and to sprinter Lydia de Vega. She initially was into lawn tennis prior to volleyball. She took up volleyball at age eight, playing informally with friends in the streets. She also cited Brazilian player Leila Barros as her inspiration to take up the sport after seeing the athlete play games in the Philippines.

Mercado studied at St. Bridget School in Quezon City playing for its volleyball team in the Milo Best women's volleyball league. She attended the De La Salle University for her collegiate studies.

== Career ==
=== Collegiate ===
Mercado played for the De La Salle Lady Spikers in the University Athletic Association of the Philippines (UAAP). She helped DLSU win three UAAP championships. She last competed for her school in 2012.

=== Club ===
Mercado joined the PCSO Bingo Milyonaryo Puffins of the Philippine Super Liga (PSL) for the 2013 Invitational Conference. She later played for the Meralco Power Spikers in 2013 Open Conference of the Shakey's V-League.

As a player of the AirAsia Flying Spikers of the PSL, Mercado was named Best Outside Hitter in the 2014 PSL All-Filipino Conference. Sometime in late 2014, Mercado rejoins Meralco Power Spikers which entered the PSL and played for them until 2015.

By 2016, Mercado is playing with the F2 Logistics Cargo Movers. She was part of the PSL All-Stars which played in the 2016 Women's Volleyball Thai-Denmark Super League. Later that year, Mercado joined the Cignal HD Spikers for the 2016 PSL Grand Prix She remains with Cignal in 2017.

In 2018, Mercado joined the Petro Gazz Angels of the Premier Volleyball League under a long-term deal. She helped the team win their first title, the 2019 Reinforced Conference.

== Personal life ==
Mercado married David Koenigswarter on January 16, 2020. Koenigswarter was a tennis player with DLSU, a pilot, and a musician. The couple have two children as of 2024.
