= 2023 Premier Volleyball League Second All-Filipino Conference =

Third conference of the 2023 PVL season

- Duration: October 15 – December 16, 2023
- Teams: 12
- Matches: 75
- Attendance: 256,364 (3,418 per match)
- TV partner(s): One Sports; One Sports+ Pilipinas Live

Results
- Champions: Creamline Cool Smashers
- Runners-up: Choco Mucho Flying Titans
- Third place: Cignal HD Spikers
- Fourth place: Chery Tiggo Crossovers

Awards
- Conference MVP: Sisi Rondina
- Finals MVP: Tots Carlos
- Best OH: Eya Laure; Jema Galanza
- Best MB: Jeanette Panaga; Marivic Meneses
- Best OPP: Michele Gumabao
- Best Setter: Gel Cayuna
- Best Libero: Thang Ponce

PVL All-Filipino Conference chronology
- < 2023 First 2024 >

PVL conference chronology
- < 2023 Invitational 2024 All-Filipino >

The 2023 Premier Volleyball League Second All-Filipino Conference was the sixteenth conference of the Premier Volleyball League. The tournament began on October 15, 2023. This tournament was set to be the second post-pandemic import-laden conference known as the 2023 Premier Volleyball League Reinforced Conference, with the Angels set to defend their crown, but was made into a second All-Filipino Conference as a consequence of sanctions from the Philippine National Volleyball Federation.

The conference not only marked the arrival of two debuting teams – Nxled Chameleons, the sister team of Akari Chargers, and Galeries Tower Highrisers, but it also marked the return of using a cross-over format for the semifinals which was last implemented on the same conference earlier this year which is the 2023 Premier Volleyball League First All-Filipino Conference. Meanwhile the Foton Tornadoes withdrew from the PVL. This is the first conference of the league catering to the most local club teams with twelve.

== Changes ==
=== Due to PNVF sanctions ===
The tournament was originally planned to be organized as the Reinforced Conference and was meant to feature teams reinforced by an import or a foreign player. However, the Philippine National Volleyball Federation penalized the PVL for violating Article 6.1.1.b of the FIVB Regulations 2022 which states that the national team period should be prioritized by professional leagues. However, the league proceeded with the opening of the Invitational Conference on June 27.

The FIVB has allowed the PVL to organize a third conference but the PNVF will not be able to issue international transfer certificates which would allow clubs to sign in foreign players for the tournament.

=== Timeout ===
The timeout regulations was changed starting from this conference in a bid to minimize match duration. A technical timeout lasting from one to two minutes will come to effect when one team reaches 13 points. Teams will have one regular timeout and another 30-second timeout for each set.

== Participating teams ==
2023 Premier Volleyball League Second All-Filipino Conference
Abbr.	Team	Affiliation	Head coach	Team captain
AKA	Akari Chargers	Akari Lighting & Technology	(Brazil) Jorge Edson	Michelle Cobb
CTC	Chery Tiggo Crossovers	United Asia Automotive Group	(Philippines) Aaron Velez	EJ Laure
CMF	Choco Mucho Flying Titans	Republic Biscuit Corporation	(Philippines) Dante Alinsunurin	Bea de Leon
CHD	Cignal HD Spikers	Cignal TV, Inc.	(Philippines) Shaq Delos Santos	Frances Molina
CCS	Creamline Cool Smashers	Republic Biscuit Corporation	(Philippines) Sherwin Meneses	Alyssa Valdez
FFF	Farm Fresh Foxies	Farm Fresh Philippine International / Strong Group Athletics	(Philippines) Jerry Yee	Louie Romero
FTL	F2 Logistics Cargo Movers	F2 Logistics Philippines	(Philippines) Regine Diego	Aby Maraño
GTH	Galeries Tower Highrisers	Grand Taipan Land Development	(Philippines) Lerma Giron	Fenela Emnas
NXL	Nxled Chameleons	Akari Lighting & Technology	(Japan) Taka Minowa	Dani Ravena
PGA	PetroGazz Angels	PetroGazz Ventures Phils.	(Philippines) Timmy Santo Tomas	Chie Saet
HSH	PLDT High Speed Hitters	PLDT Inc.	(Philippines) Rald Ricafort	Mika Reyes
GFD	Quezon City Gerflor Defenders	Gerflor Philippines / Quezon City Sports Management Services	(Philippines) Sammy Acaylar	Pia Sarmiento

== Venues ==
Regular venues

Preliminaries	Preliminaries, Semifinals
San Juan, Metro Manila	Pasig
Filoil EcoOil Centre	PhilSports Arena
Capacity: 6,000	Capacity: 10,000
Preliminaries, Finals	Finals
Quezon City	Pasay
Araneta Coliseum	SM Mall of Asia Arena
Capacity: 20,000	Capacity: 20,000

PVL on Tour venues

Preliminaries
Santa Rosa, Laguna	Batangas City	Antipolo
Santa Rosa Sports Complex	Batangas City Sports Center	Ynares Center
Capacity: 5,700	Capacity: 5,000	Capacity: 7,400
Candon	Cagayan de Oro	Iloilo City
Candon City Arena	Aquilino Q. Pimentel Jr. International Convention Center	University of San Agustin Gymnasium
Capacity: 5,000	Capacity: 7,400	Capacity: 3,000

== Transactions ==
=== Team additions and transfers ===
The following are the players who transferred to another team for the upcoming conference.

Player	Moving from	Moving to	Ref.
Mereophe Evangeline Sharma	De La Salle Lady Spikers(UAAP)	Akari Chargers	
Roselle Baliton	Chery Tiggo Crossovers	Akari Chargers	
Ylizyeth Justine Jazareno	De La Salle Lady Spikers (UAAP)	Akari Chargers	
France Ronquillo	Foton Tornadoes	Chery Tiggo Crossovers	
Jaila Atienza	Foton Tornadoes	Chery Tiggo Crossovers	
Jasmine Nabor	Foton Tornadoes	Chery Tiggo Crossovers	
Ma. Shaya Adorador	Foton Tornadoes	Chery Tiggo Crossovers	
Mary Antonette Landicho	Foton Tornadoes	Chery Tiggo Crossovers	
Seth Marione Rodriguez	Foton Tornadoes	Chery Tiggo Crossovers	
Maria Fe Galanza	UST Golden Tigresses(UAAP)	Creamline Cool Smashers	
Theo Bea Bonafe	UP Lady Fighting Maroons (UAAP)	Creamline Cool Smashers	
Ethan Lainne Arce	Quezon City Gerflor Defenders	F2 Logistics Cargo Movers	
Mary Joy Dacoron	Cignal HD Spikers	F2 Logistics Cargo Movers	
Alyssa Bertolano	Quezon City Gerflor Defenders	Farm Fresh Foxies	
Justine Dorog	Quezon City Gerflor Defenders	Farm Fresh Foxies	
Louie Romero	Adamson Lady Falcons (UAAP)	Farm Fresh Foxies	
Rizza Andrea Cruz	Adamson Lady Falcons (UAAP)	Farm Fresh Foxies	
Carlota Hernandez	Foton Tornadoes	Galeries Highrisers	
Fenela Risha Emnas	Quezon City Gerflor Defenders	Galeries Highrisers	
Julia Angeles	Quezon City Gerflor Defenders	Galeries Highrisers	
Juliet Catindig	Quezon City Gerflor Defenders	Galeries Highrisers	
Mary Grace Masangkay	Choco Mucho Flying Titans	Galeries Highrisers	
Norielle Julia Ipac	Petro Gazz Angels	Galeries Highrisers	
Rapril Aguilar	Quezon City Gerflor Defenders	Galeries Highrisers	
Renesa Melgar	JRU Lady Bombers (NCAA)	Galeries Highrisers	
Roma Joy Doromal	Perlas Spikers	Galeries Highrisers	
Ysabel Jamie Jimenez	PLDT High Speed Hitters	Galeries Highrisers	
Grazielle Bombita	Cignal HD Spikers	Galeries Highrisers	
Camille Victoria	Akari Chargers	Nxled Chameleons	
Chiara May Permentilla	Akari Chargers	Nxled Chameleons	
Danielle Theris Ravena	Akari Chargers	Nxled Chameleons	
Janine Navarro	Quezon City Gerflor Defenders	Nxled Chameleons	
Jhoanna Louisse Maraguinot	Akari Chargers	Nxled Chameleons	
Judith Abil	BaliPure Purest Water Defenders	Nxled Chameleons	
Kamille Cal	UP Fighting Maroons (UAAP)	Nxled Chameleons	
Krich Aeshelouz Macaslang	Akari Chargers	Nxled Chameleons	
Lia Alexa Pelaga	UE Lady Warriors (UAAP)	Nxled Chameleons	
Lycha Ebon	Akari Chargers	Nxled Chameleons	
May Luna	Foton Tornadoes	Nxled Chameleons	
Maria Regina Agatha Mangulabnan	Foton Tornadoes	Nxled Chameleons	
Rachel Victoria Jorvina	Akari Chargers	Nxled Chameleons	
Babylove Barbon	Foton Tornadoes	Petro Gazz Angels	
Ivy Jisel Perez	Quezon City Gerflor Defenders	Petro Gazz Angels	
Matet Espina	De La Salle Lady Archers (UAAP)	Petro Gazz Angels	
Ranya Musa	Quezon City Gerflor Defenders	Petro Gazz Angels	
Angelica Legacion	Chery Tiggo Crossovers	PLDT High Speed Hitters	
Lutgarda Malaluan	Akari Chargers	PLDT High Speed Hitters	
Bien Elaine Juanillo	BaliPure Purest Water Defenders	Quezon City Gerflor Defenders	
Danika Gandrauli	Sta. Lucia Lady Realtors	Quezon City Gerflor Defenders	
Jhona Rosal	Perpetual Lady Altas(NCAA)	Quezon City Gerflor Defenders	
Kimberly Grace Manzano	San Beda Red Lionesses (NCAA)	Quezon City Gerflor Defenders	
Lhara Maye Clavano	PLDT High Speed Hitters	Quezon City Gerflor Defenders	
Mary Grace Berte	Petron Blaze Spikers (PSL)	Quezon City Gerflor Defenders	
Sarah Jane Gonzales	Philippine Army Lady Troopers	Quezon City Gerflor Defenders	
Satriani Espiritu	BaliPure Purest Water Defenders	Quezon City Gerflor Defenders	

=== Coaching changes ===
Team	Outgoing coach	Manner of departure	Replaced by	Ref
Petro Gazz Angels	(Philippines) Oliver Almadro	Reassigned	(Philippines) Timmy Santo Tomas	
Quezon City Gerflor Defenders	(Philippines) Edgar Barroga	Replaced	(Philippines) Sammy Acaylar	

== Format ==
Preliminary Round

1. The twelve teams will compete in a single round-robin elimination.
2. Teams are ranked using the FIVB Ranking System.
3. Top four teams will advance to the semifinals.

Semifinals

1. Best-of-three series.
2. 1st ranked team vs. 4th ranked team
3. 2nd ranked team vs. 3rd ranked team

Finals

1. Best-of-three series.
2. Bronze medal: SF1 Loser vs. SF2 Loser
3. Gold medal: SF1 Winner vs. SF2 Winner

== Pool standing procedure ==
- First, teams are ranked by the number of matches won.
- If the number of matches won is tied, the tied teams are then ranked by match points, wherein:
  - Match won 3–0 or 3–1: 3 match points for the winner, 0 match points for the loser.
  - Match won 3–2: 2 match points for the winner, 1 match point for the loser.
- In case of any further ties, the following criteria shall be used:
  - Set ratio: the number of sets won divided by number of sets lost.
  - Point ratio: number of points scored divided by number of points allowed.
  - Head-to-head standings: any remaining tied teams are ranked based on the results of head-to-head matches involving the teams in question.

== Preliminary round ==
- All times are Philippine Standard Time (UTC+8:00).

=== Ranking ===
Pos	Team	Pld	W	L	Pts	SW	SL	SR	SPW	SPL	SPR	Qualification
1	Creamline Cool Smashers	11	11	0	32	33	7	4.714	977	786	1.243	Final round
2	Choco Mucho Flying Titans	11	10	1	29	31	7	4.429	899	724	1.242	Final round
3	Cignal HD Spikers	11	8	3	25	26	15	1.733	947	842	1.125	Final round
4	Chery Tiggo Crossovers	11	8	3	22	26	16	1.625	851	809	1.052	Final round
5	PLDT High Speed Hitters	11	7	4	21	25	15	1.667	914	901	1.014	
6	Petro Gazz Angels	11	6	5	20	25	17	1.471	941	900	1.046	
7	Akari Chargers	11	5	6	14	19	22	0.864	912	922	0.989	
8	F2 Logistics Cargo Movers	11	4	7	13	18	23	0.783	790	780	1.013	
9	Nxled Chameleons	11	4	7	12	14	23	0.609	786	851	0.924	
10	Farm Fresh Foxies	11	2	9	7	13	28	0.464	878	933	0.941	
11	Galeries Tower Highrisers	11	1	10	2	6	32	0.188	704	925	0.761	
12	Quezon City Gerflor Defenders	11	0	11	1	2	33	0.061	531	857	0.620	

Source: PhilSports.ph

=== Match results ===
Date	Time	Venue		Score		Set 1	Set 2	Set 3	Set 4	Set 5	Total	Report
Oct 15	15:00	SAC	Quezon City Gerflor Defenders	0–3	Nxled Chameleons	18–25	14–25	19–25			51–75	P2
Oct 15	17:00	SAC	PLDT High Speed Hitters	1–3	Cignal HD Spikers	16–25	25–20	21–25	20–25		82–95	P2
Oct 15	19:00	SAC	Choco Mucho Flying Titans	1–3	Creamline Cool Smashers	18–25	16–25	26–24	21–25		81–99	P2
Oct 17	15:00	SAC	Chery Tiggo Crossovers	3–0	Farm Fresh Foxies	25–21	25–23	25–22			75–66	P2
Oct 17	17:00	SAC	F2 Logistics Cargo Movers	2–3	Akari Chargers	25–21	20–25	25–27	25–19	8–15	103–107	P2
Oct 17	19:00	SAC	Petro Gazz Angels	3–0	Galeries Tower Highrisers	25–11	26–24	25–22			76–57	P2
Oct 19	15:00	FEC	Chery Tiggo Crossovers	3–0	Galeries Tower Highrisers	25–14	25–15	25–21			75–50	P2
Oct 19	17:00	FEC	PLDT High Speed Hitters	3–0	Akari Chargers	25–16	25–16	25–23			75–55	P2
Oct 19	19:00	FEC	Choco Mucho Flying Titans	3–0	Farm Fresh Foxies	25–18	25–13	25–17			75–48	P2
Oct 21	16:00	BCC	Petro Gazz Angels	3–0	Quezon City Gerflor Defenders	25–11	25–4	25–23			75–38	P2
Oct 21	18:00	BCC	Creamline Cool Smashers	3–0	Cignal HD Spikers	25–20	25–20	25–16			75–56	P2
Oct 24	14:00	YCA	F2 Logistics Cargo Movers	3–0	Nxled Chameleons	25–20	25–14	25–16			75–50	P2
Oct 24	16:00	YCA	Farm Fresh Foxies	0–3	PLDT High Speed Hitters	17–25	17–25	20–25			54–75	P2
Oct 24	18:00	YCA	Akari Chargers	3–1	Chery Tiggo Crossovers	25–20	18–25	25–22	25–20		93–87	P2
Oct 26	14:00	YCA	Quezon City Gerflor Defenders	0–3	Creamline Cool Smashers	15–25	12–25	10–25			37–75	P2
Oct 26	16:00	YCA	Akari Chargers	3–1	Farm Fresh Foxies	21–25	26–24	25–15	25–21		97–85	P2
Oct 26	18:00	YCA	Cignal HD Spikers	0–3	Choco Mucho Flying Titans	21–25	19–25	18–25			58–75	P2
Oct 28	16:00	CCA	Galeries Tower Highrisers	0–3	F2 Logistics Cargo Movers	15–25	22–25	17–25			54–75	P2
Oct 28	18:00	CCA	Nxled Chameleons	0–3	Petro Gazz Angels	23–25	21–25	22–25			66–75	P2
Oct 31	14:00	FEC	Chery Tiggo Crossovers	3–0	Quezon City Gerflor Defenders	25–8	25–12	25–20			75–40	P2
Oct 31	16:00	FEC	Farm Fresh Foxies	1–3	Creamline Cool Smashers	21–25	25–21	20–25	22–25		88–96	P2
Oct 31	18:00	FEC	Cignal HD Spikers	3–1	Akari Chargers	25–18	19–25	25–21	25–20		94–84	P2
Nov 02	14:00	SRSC	PLDT High Speed Hitters	3–1	Nxled Chameleons	22–25	25–17	25–11	25–20		97–73	P2
Nov 02	16:00	SRSC	Choco Mucho Flying Titans	3–0	Galeries Tower Highrisers	25–21	25–16	25–20			75–57	P2
Nov 02	18:00	SRSC	F2 Logistics Cargo Movers	0–3	Petro Gazz Angels	22–25	25–27	14–25			61–77	P2
Nov 04	14:00	PSA	Farm Fresh Foxies	1–3	Cignal HD Spikers	23–25	25–23	20–25	17–25		85–98	P2
Nov 04	16:00	PSA	Quezon City Gerflor Defenders	0–3	PLDT High Speed Hitters	8–25	9–25	17–25			34–75	P2
Nov 04	18:00	PSA	Petro Gazz Angels	1–3	Chery Tiggo Crossovers	15–25	25–27	25–18	23–25		88–95	P2
Nov 07	14:00	PSA	Nxled Chameleons	0–3	Choco Mucho Flying Titans	11–25	20–25	19–25			50–75	P2
Nov 07	16:00	PSA	Farm Fresh Foxies	2–3	F2 Logistics Cargo Movers	26–28	25–20	23–25	25–23	8–15	107–111	P2
Nov 07	18:00	PSA	Galeries Tower Highrisers	1–3	Cignal HD Spikers	17–25	17–25	26–24	11–25		71–99	P2
Nov 09	12:00	PSA	Quezon City Gerflor Defenders	0–3	F2 Logistics Cargo Movers	10–25	16–25	14–25			40–75	P2
Nov 09	14:00	PSA	Galeries Tower Highrisers	0–3	PLDT High Speed Hitters	27–29	14–25	18–25			59–79	P2
Nov 09	16:00	PSA	Nxled Chameleons	1–3	Chery Tiggo Crossovers	25–22	29–31	23–25	26–28		103–106	P2
Nov 09	18:00	PSA	Creamline Cool Smashers	3–2	Petro Gazz Angels	25–22	23–25	25–27	25–19	15–13	113–106	P2
Nov 11	14:00	PSA	Cignal HD Spikers	3–1	Petro Gazz Angels	25–15	25–23	18–25	25–19		93–82	P2
Nov 11	16:00	PSA	Akari Chargers	0–3	Choco Mucho Flying Titans	23–25	21–25	19–25			63–75	P2
Nov 11	18:00	PSA	PLDT High Speed Hitters	1–3	Chery Tiggo Crossovers	25–14	20–25	26–28	19–25		90–92	P2
Nov 14	14:00	SAC	Farm Fresh Foxies	3–0	Quezon City Gerflor Defenders	25–17	25–17	25–15			75–49	P2
Nov 14	16:00	SAC	Akari Chargers	1–3	Nxled Chameleons	25–22	17–25	23–25	16–25		81–97	P2
Nov 14	18:00	SAC	F2 Logistics Cargo Movers	0–3	Creamline Cool Smashers	19–25	21–25	16–25			56–75	P2
Nov 16	14:00	FEC	Nxled Chameleons	3–0	Galeries Tower Highrisers	25–22	25–18	25–17			75–57	P2
Nov 16	16:00	FEC	F2 Logistics Cargo Movers	1–3	Cignal HD Spikers	23–25	25–22	24–26	24–26		96–99	P2
Nov 16	18:00	FEC	Petro Gazz Angels	1–3	Choco Mucho Flying Titans	25–18	23–25	15–25	16–25		79–93	P2
Nov 18	14:00	ICC	Quezon City Gerflor Defenders	0–3	Akari Chargers	18–25	15–25	19–25			52–75	P2
Nov 18	16:00	ICC	PLDT High Speed Hitters	0–3	Creamline Cool Smashers	23–25	21–25	19–25			63–75	P2
Nov 21	14:00	PSA	Petro Gazz Angels	3–1	Farm Fresh Foxies	25–22	19–25	25–16	26–24		95–87	P2
Nov 21	16:00	PSA	Cignal HD Spikers	2–3	Chery Tiggo Crossovers	25–17	19–25	25–21	22–25	14–16	105–104	P2
Nov 21	18:00	PSA	Choco Mucho Flying Titans	3–1	F2 Logistics Cargo Movers	19–25	25–8	25–17	25–19		94–69	P2
Nov 23	14:00	PSA	Galeries Tower Highrisers	0–3	Akari Chargers	14–25	21–25	19–25			54–75	P2
Nov 23	16:00	PSA	Creamline Cool Smashers	3–0	Nxled Chameleons	25–23	25–16	25–21			75–60	P2
Nov 23	18:00	PSA	Choco Mucho Flying Titans	3–2	PLDT High Speed Hitters	25–20	23–25	18–25	25–17	15–12	106–99	P2
Nov 25	14:00	PSA	Cignal HD Spikers	3–0	Nxled Chameleons	25–17	25–14	25–14			75–45	P2
Nov 25	16:00	PSA	Akari Chargers	1–3	Petro Gazz Angels	18–25	25–17	22–25	30–32		95–99	P2
Nov 25	18:00	PSA	Chery Tiggo Crossovers	3–2	F2 Logistics Cargo Movers	27–25	11–25	17–25	25–22	15–10	95–107	P2
Nov 28	14:00	PSA	Farm Fresh Foxies	3–1	Galeries Tower Highrisers	25–10	25–18	24–26	25–16		99–70	P2
Nov 28	16:00	PSA	Choco Mucho Flying Titans	3–0	Quezon City Gerflor Defenders	25–16	25–17	25–11			75–44	P2
Nov 28	18:00	PSA	Creamline Cool Smashers	3–1	Chery Tiggo Crossovers	25–22	24–26	25–20	25–16		99–84	P2
Nov 30	14:00	PSA	Galeries Tower Highrisers	3–2	Quezon City Gerflor Defenders	18–25	24–26	25–23	25–18	15–11	107–103	P2
Nov 30	16:00	PSA	Creamline Cool Smashers	3–1	Akari Chargers	26–28	25–14	25–23	25–22		101–87	P2
Nov 30	18:00	PSA	F2 Logistics Cargo Movers	0–3	PLDT High Speed Hitters	21–25	25–27	23–25			69–77	P2
Dec 02	16:00	ILO	Nxled Chameleons	3–1	Farm Fresh Foxies	25–22	17–25	25–20	25–17		92–84	P2
Dec 02	18:00	ILO	Chery Tiggo Crossovers	0–3	Choco Mucho Flying Titans	16–25	19–25	23–25			58–75	P2
Dec 05	14:00	PSA	Quezon City Gerflor Defenders	0–3	Cignal HD Spikers	22–25	11–25	10–25			43–75	P2
Dec 05	16:00	PSA	Galeries Tower Highrisers	1–3	Creamline Cool Smashers	25–19	16–25	14–25	13–25		68–94	P2
Dec 05	18:00	PSA	PLDT High Speed Hitters	3–2	Petro Gazz Angels	16–25	25–17	21–25	25–15	15–7	102–89	P2

== Final round ==
- All times are Philippine Standard Time (UTC+8:00).

Semifinals
December 7–9
1 Creamline	3	3
4 Chery Tiggo	0	0
December 7–12
2 Choco Mucho	2	3	3
3 Cignal	3	0	1

Championship
December 14–16
Creamline	3	3
Choco Mucho	1	2
3rd place match
December 14–16
Chery Tiggo	1	1
Cignal	3	3

=== Semifinals ===
Rank 1 vs. Rank 4

- Creamline wins series, 2–0

Date	Time	Venue		Score		Set 1	Set 2	Set 3	Set 4	Set 5	Total	Report
Dec 07	16:00	PSA	Creamline Cool Smashers	3–0	Chery Tiggo Crossovers	25–18	27–25	25–22			77–65	P2
Dec 09	18:00	PSA	Chery Tiggo Crossovers	0–3	Creamline Cool Smashers	24–26	21–25	21–25			66–76	P2

Rank 2 vs. Rank 3

- Choco Mucho wins series, 2–1

Date	Time	Venue		Score		Set 1	Set 2	Set 3	Set 4	Set 5	Total	Report
Dec 07	18:00	PSA	Choco Mucho Flying Titans	2–3	Cignal HD Spikers	25–18	25–23	14–25	19–25	10–15	93–106	P2
Dec 09	16:00	PSA	Cignal HD Spikers	0–3	Choco Mucho Flying Titans	23–25	22–25	22–25			67–75	P2
Dec 12	18:00	PSA	Choco Mucho Flying Titans	3–1	Cignal HD Spikers	25–20	23–25	26–24	25–23		99–92	P2

=== Finals ===
==== 3rd place ====
- Cignal wins series, 2–0

Date	Time	Venue		Score		Set 1	Set 2	Set 3	Set 4	Set 5	Total	Report
Dec 14	16:00	MOA	Chery Tiggo Crossovers	1–3	Cignal HD Spikers	19–25	25–21	15–25	20–25		79–96	P2
Dec 16	16:00	SAC	Cignal HD Spikers	3–1	Chery Tiggo Crossovers	18–25	25–21	25–22	26–24		94–92	P2

==== Championship ====
- Creamline wins series, 2–0

Date	Time	Venue		Score		Set 1	Set 2	Set 3	Set 4	Set 5	Total	Report
Dec 14	18:00	MOA	Creamline Cool Smashers	3–1	Choco Mucho Flying Titans	25–23	19–25	26–24	25–22		95–94	P2
Dec 16	18:00	SAC	Choco Mucho Flying Titans	2–3	Creamline Cool Smashers	25–22	20–25	27–29	26–24	12–15	110–115	P2

== Final standing ==
Rank	Team
1st place, gold medalist(s)	Creamline Cool Smashers
2nd place, silver medalist(s)	Choco Mucho Flying Titans
3rd place, bronze medalist(s)	Cignal HD Spikers
4	Chery Tiggo Crossovers
5	PLDT High Speed Hitters
6	Petro Gazz Angels
7	Akari Chargers
8	F2 Logistics Cargo Movers
9	Nxled Chameleons
10	Farm Fresh Foxies
11	Galeries Tower Highrisers
12	Quezon City Gerflor Defenders

2023 PVL Second All-Filipino champions
Creamline Cool Smashers
Seventh title

Team roster
Alyssa Valdez (c), Kyle Negrito, Risa Sato, Jeanette Panaga, Michele Gumabao, Jorella Marie De Jesus, Lorielyn Bernardo, Maria Paulina Soriano, Kyla Atienza, Theo Bea Bonafe, Rizza Jane Mandapat, Rosemarie Vargas, Jessica Margarett Galanza, Bernadeth Pons, Maria Fe Galanza, Diana Mae Carlos
Head coach
Sherwin Meneses

== Awards and medalists ==
=== Individual awards ===
Award	Player	Team	Ref.
Conference Most Valuable Player	Sisi Rondina	Choco Mucho	
Finals Most Valuable Player	Tots Carlos	Creamline	
1st Best Outside Spiker	Ejiya Laure	Chery Tiggo	
2nd Best Outside Spiker	Jema Galanza	Creamline	
1st Best Middle Blocker	Jeanette Panaga	Creamline	
2nd Best Middle Blocker	Ria Meneses	Cignal	
Best Opposite Spiker	Michele Gumabao	Creamline	
Best Setter	Gel Cayuna	Cignal	
Best Libero	Tonnie Rose Ponce	Choco Mucho	

=== Medalists ===
Gold	Silver	Bronze
Creamline Cool Smashers Alyssa Valdez (c); Kyle Negrito; Risa Sato; Jeanette Panaga; Michele Gumabao; Jorella Marie De Jesus (L); Lorielyn Bernardo; Maria Paulina Soriano; Kyla Atienza (L); Theo Bea Bonafe; Rizza Jane Mandapat; Rosemarie Vargas; Jessica Margarett Galanza; Bernadeth Pons; Maria Fe Galanza; Diana Mae Carlos Head coach: Sherwin Meneses	Choco Mucho Flying Titans Isabel Beatriz De Leon (c); Maria Lina Isabel Molde; Desiree Wynea Cheng; Ma. Deanna Izabella Wong; Caitlin Viray; Madeleine Yrenea Madayag; Maika Angela Ortiz; Katrina Mae Tolentino; Aduke Christine Ogunsanya; Jamenea Ferrer; Denden Lazaro-Revilla (L); Toni Rose Ponce (L); Sisi Rondina; Regine Anne Arocha; Cherry Rose Nunag Head coach: Dante Alinsunurin	Cignal HD Spikers Frances Xinia Molina (c); Glaudine Troncoso; Roselyn Doria; Rachel Daquis; Geneveve Casugod; Vanie Gandler; Jovelyn Gonzaga; Fatima Bia General; Toni Rose Basas; Jacqueline Acuña; Gyzelle Sy; Angelique Beatrice Dionela (L); Jerilli Malabanan; Marivic Velaine Meneses; Anngela Nunag (L); Maria Gel Cayuna Head coach: Cesael Delos Santos

== Statistics leaders ==
Statistics leaders correct at the end of the preliminary round.

Best Scorers
Rank	Name	Points
1	Savannah Dawn Davison	202
2	Sisi Rondina	194
3	Eya Laure	186
4	Trisha Gayle Tubu	183
5	Dindin Santiago-Manabat	179

Best Spikers
Rank	Name	%Eff
1	Diana Mae Carlos	40.14
2	Michele Gumabao	39.74
3	Sisi Rondina	37.94
4	Eya Laure	35.55
5	Trisha Gayle Tubu	34.98

Best Blockers
Rank	Name	Avg
1	Camille Victoria	0.59
2	Princes Ezra Madrigal	0.56
3	Savannah Dawn Davison	0.55
4	Ivy Lacsina	0.54
5	Dell Palomata	0.50

Best Servers
Rank	Name	Avg
1	Krich Aeshelouz Macaslang	0.38
2	Gel Cayuna	0.37
3	Ara Galang	0.34
4	Eya Laure	0.33
5	Kyle Negrito	0.33

Best Diggers
Rank	Name	Avg
1	Kath Arado	5.55
2	Tonnie Rose Ponce	4.71
3	Dawn Macandili-Catindig	3.88
4	Babylove Barbon	3.17
5	Pia Gabrielle Sarmiento	3.14

Best Setters
Rank	Name	Avg
1	Deanna Wong	5.08
2	Kyle Negrito	4.88
3	Louie Romero	4.56
4	Gel Cayuna	4.44
5	Jasmine Nabor	4.05

Best Receivers
Rank	Name	%Succ
1	Jennifer Nierva	52.58
2	Ara Galang	43.72
3	Sisi Rondina	39.77
4	Jhoanna Louisse Maraguinot	38.30
5	Rapril Aguilar	37.30

== Broadcast notes ==
One Sports is the official broadcaster of the 2023 Premier Volleyball League Second All-Filipino Conference games.

Game	Play-by-play	Analyst	Courtside Reporter
Semifinals CTC vs. CCS, Game 1	Miguel de Guzman	Mela Tunay	Jaime Ascalon
Semifinals CHD vs. CMF, Game 1	Chiqui Roa-Puno	Jamie Lavitoria	Frannie Reyes
Semifinals CMF vs. CHD, Game 2	Dyp Dypiangco	Dzi Gervacio	Kylla Castillo
Semifinals CCS vs. CTC, Game 2	Migs Gomez	Ayel Estrañero	Sam Corrales
Semifinals CHD vs. CMF, Game 3	Boom Gonzalez	Dzi Gervacio	Lexi Rodriguez
Battle for Third, Game 1	Billie Capistrano	Ayel Estrañero	Kyla Kingsu
Finals, Game 1	Eric Tipan	Neil Flores	Jaime Ascalon
Battle for Third Game 2	Denice Dinsay	Synjin Reyes	Frannie Reyes
Finals, Game 2	Boom Gonzalez	Neil Flores	Sam Corrales

== See also ==
- 2023 Spikers' Turf Invitational Conference
