= 2023 Premier Volleyball League Invitational Conference =

Second conference of the 2023 PVL season

- Duration: June 27 – July 30, 2023
- Teams: 13
- Matches: 43
- Attendance: 137,016 (3,186 per match)
- TV partner(s): One Sports; One Sports+ Pilipinas Live

Results
- Champions: Kurashiki Ablaze
- Runners-up: Creamline Cool Smashers
- Third place: Cignal HD Spikers
- Fourth place: F2 Logistics Cargo Movers

Awards
- Conference MVP: Frances Molina
- Finals MVP: Kyoka Ohshima
- Best OH: Asaka Tamaru; Alyssa Valdez
- Best MB: Majoy Baron; Celine Domingo
- Best OPP: Tots Carlos
- Best Setter: Gel Cayuna
- Best Libero: Kath Arado

PVL Invitational Conference chronology
- < 2022 2024 >

PVL conference chronology
- < 2023 First All-Filipino 2023 Second All-Filipino >

The 2023 Premier Volleyball League Invitational Conference was the fifteenth conference of the Premier Volleyball League and its six conference as a professional league. The tournament was originally scheduled to start on June 6, 2023, however, it was moved to June 27, 2023, due to the Philippines women's national volleyball team competing at the 2023 Asian Women's Volleyball Challenge Cup.

This conference introduced three debuting teams in the league — Farm Fresh Foxies and Quezon City Gerflor Defenders as newly formed teams, and the return of Foton Tornadoes in the Filipino volleyball scene after the original team was rebranded as Chery Tiggo Crossovers in 2020. Philippine Army Lady Troopers is skipping this conference due to military training to most of its players. Two foreign teams, Kurashiki Ablaze of Japan and Kinh Bắc Bắc Ninh of Vietnam, also participated in the conference.

With these new additions alongside the two foreign guest teams, this is the first conference of the PVL that has more than ten participating corporate teams. Moreover, this is also the most contested conference of the league, by having thirteen teams — the most by any conference so far.

== Participating teams ==
2023 Premier Volleyball League Invitational Conference
| Abbr. | Team | Affiliation | Head coach | Team captain |
Local teams
| AKA | Akari Chargers | Akari Lighting & Technology | (Brazil) Jorge Edson | (Philippines) Michelle Cobb |
| CTC | Chery Tiggo Crossovers | United Asia Automotive Group | (Philippines) Aaron Velez | (Philippines) Mylene Paat |
| CMF | Choco Mucho Flying Titans | Republic Biscuit Corporation | (Philippines) Dante Alinsunurin | (Philippines) Bea de Leon |
| CHD | Cignal HD Spikers | Cignal TV, Inc. | (Philippines) Shaq Delos Santos | (Philippines) Rachel Daquis |
| CCS | Creamline Cool Smashers | Republic Biscuit Corporation | (Philippines) Sherwin Meneses | (Philippines) Alyssa Valdez |
| FTL | F2 Logistics Cargo Movers | F2 Logistics Philippines | (Philippines) Regine Diego | (Philippines) Aby Maraño |
| FFF | Farm Fresh Foxies | Farm Fresh Philippine International | (Philippines) Jerry Yee | (Philippines) Cloanne Mondoñedo |
| FOT | Foton Tornadoes | United Asia Automotive Group | (Philippines) Brian Esquibel | (Philippines) Shaya Adorador |
| PGA | Petro Gazz Angels | PetroGazz Ventures Phils. | (Philippines) Oliver Almadro | (Philippines) Chie Saet |
| HSH | PLDT High Speed Hitters | PLDT Inc. | (Philippines) Rald Ricafort | (Philippines) Mika Reyes |
| GFD | Quezon City Gerflor Defenders | Gerflor Philippines / Quezon City Sports Management Services | (Philippines) Edgar Barroga | (Philippines) Justine Dorog |
Foreign teams
| KBB | Kinh Bắc Bắc Ninh | Volleyball Vietnam League | (Vietnam) Phạm Văn Long | (Vietnam) Nguyễn Thị Kiều Oanh |
| KUR | Kurashiki Ablaze | Ablaze Co., Ltd. / V.League (Japan) | (Japan) Hideo Suzuki | (Japan) Ohshima Kyoka |

== Pools composition ==
The teams are grouped into two pools using the serpentine system with the 2023 All-Filipino Conference final standings as basis. Quezon City Gerflor Defenders is drawn to Pool A, and Farm Fresh Foxies and Foton Tornadoes are drawn to Pool B.

Measures were placed to ensure that sister teams (Creamline and Choco Mucho; PLDT and Cignal HD; Chery Tiggo and Foton) would not be drawn in the same pool.

| Pool A | Pool B |
|---|---|
| Creamline Cool Smashers (1) | Petro Gazz Angels (2) |
| PLDT High Speed Hitters (4) | F2 Logistics Cargo Movers (3) |
| Chery Tiggo Crossovers (5) | Cignal HD Spikers (6) |
| Akari Chargers (8) | Choco Mucho Flying Titans (7) |
| Quezon City Gerflor Defenders (—) | Farm Fresh Foxies (—) |
| —N/a | Foton Tornadoes (—) |

== Venues ==
| Preliminaries | Preliminaries, Classification, Semifinals, Finals |
| San Juan City | Pasig City |
|---|---|
| Filoil EcoOil Centre | PhilSports Arena |
| Capacity: 6,000 | Capacity: 10,000 |

== Transactions ==
=== National team players ===
The following players are part of the Philippines women's national volleyball team that played in the Volleyball at the 2023 SEA Games – Women's tournament and the 2023 Asian Women's Volleyball Challenge Cup.

| Team | Player/s | | | | | | |
|---|---|---|---|---|---|---|---|
| Akari Chargers | Michelle Cobb | Ezra Madrigal | Faith Nisperos | Bang Pineda | Eli Soyud | —N/a | |
| Chery Tiggo Crossovers | Mylene Paat | —N/a | | | | | |
| Choco Mucho Flying Titans | Cherry Rose Nunag | Kat Tolentino | —N/a | | | | |
| Cignal HD Spikers | Gel Cayuna | Glaudine Troncoso | —N/a | | | | |
| Creamline Cool Smashers | Kyla Atienza | Tots Carlos | Jia De Guzman | Celine Domingo | Jesicca Galanza | Michele Gumabao | Alyssa Valdez |
| Foton Tornadoes | Shaya Adorador | —N/a | | | | | |
| Petro Gazz Angels | Djanel Cheng | Aiza Maizo-Pontillas | —N/a | | | | |
| PLDT High Speed Hitters | Dell Palomata | Jules Samonte | —N/a | | | | |

=== Team additions and transfers ===
The following are the players who are newly added and/or transferred to another team for the upcoming conference.

| Player | Moving from | Moving to | Ref. |
|---|---|---|---|
| Faith Janine Shirley Nisperos | Ateneo Blue Eagles (UAAP) | Akari Chargers | |
| Lutgarda Malaluan | Army Black Mamba Lady Troopers | Akari Chargers | |
| Angelica Legacion | Petron Blaze Spikers (PSL) | Chery Tiggo Crossovers | |
| Chamberlaine Cuñada^{a} | Letran Lady Knights (NCAA) | Chery Tiggo Crossovers | |
| Ejiya Laure | UST Golden Tigresses (UAAP) | Chery Tiggo Crossovers | |
| Imee Kim Gabriella Hernandez | UST Golden Tigresses (UAAP) | Chery Tiggo Crossovers | |
| Jennifer Nierva | NU Lady Bulldogs (UAAP) | Chery Tiggo Crossovers | |
| Joyme Cagande | NU Lady Bulldogs (UAAP) | Chery Tiggo Crossovers | |
| Princess Anne Robles | NU Lady Bulldogs (UAAP) | Chery Tiggo Crossovers | |
| Cherry Ann Rondina | Creamline Beach Volleyball (Beach Volleyball) | Choco Mucho Flying Titans | |
| Anngela Nunag | Army Black Mamba Lady Troopers | Cignal HD Spikers | |
| Jovelyn Gonzaga | Army Black Mamba Lady Troopers | Cignal HD Spikers | |
| Vanie Gandler | Ateneo Blue Eagles (UAAP) | Cignal HD Spikers | |
| Bernadeth Pons | Creamline Beach Volleyball (Beach Volleyball) | Creamline Cool Smashers | |
| Jolina Dela Cruz | De La Salle Lady Spikers (UAAP) | F2 Logistics Cargo Movers | |
| Marionne Alba | De La Salle Lady Spikers (UAAP) | F2 Logistics Cargo Movers | |
| Jovelyn Fernandez | FEU Lady Tamaraws (UAAP) | F2 Logistics Cargo Movers | |
| Aprylle Ckyle Tagsip | Adamson Lady Falcons (UAAP) | Farm Fresh Foxies | |
| Cae Jelean Lazo | Adamson Lady Falcons (UAAP) | Farm Fresh Foxies | |
| Camill Avila^{b} | Benilde Lady Blazers (NCAA) | Farm Fresh Foxies | |
| Chenae Basarte^{b} | Benilde Lady Blazers (NCAA) | Farm Fresh Foxies | |
| Cloanne Sophia Mondoñedo^{b} | Benilde Lady Blazers (NCAA) | Farm Fresh Foxies | |
| Corrine Apostol^{b} | Benilde Lady Blazers (NCAA) | Farm Fresh Foxies | |
| Francis Mycah Go^{b} | Benilde Lady Blazers (NCAA) | Farm Fresh Foxies | |
| Jade Gentapa^{b} | Benilde Lady Blazers (NCAA) | Farm Fresh Foxies | |
| Jessa Dorog^{b} | Benilde Lady Blazers (NCAA) | Farm Fresh Foxies | |
| Jhasmin Gayle Pascual^{b} | Benilde Lady Blazers (NCAA) | Farm Fresh Foxies | |
| Joan Narit | Ateneo Blue Eagles (UAAP) | Farm Fresh Foxies | |
| Kate Nhorryle Santiago | Adamson Lady Falcons (UAAP) | Farm Fresh Foxies | |
| Michelle Gamit^{b} | Benilde Lady Blazers (NCAA) | Farm Fresh Foxies | |
| Pia Ildefonso | Ateneo Blue Eagles (UAAP) | Farm Fresh Foxies | |
| Trisha Tubu | Adamson Lady Falcons (UAAP) | Farm Fresh Foxies | |
| Wielyn Estoque^{b} | Benilde Lady Blazers (NCAA) | Farm Fresh Foxies | |
| Babylove Barbon | UST Golden Tigresses (UAAP) | Foton Tornadoes | |
| Bernadette Flora | BaliPure Purest Water Defenders | Foton Tornadoes | |
| Carlota Harnandez | BaliPure Purest Water Defenders | Foton Tornadoes | |
| France Ronquillo | Chery Tiggo Crossovers | Foton Tornadoes | |
| Jaila Atienza | Chery Tiggo Crossovers | Foton Tornadoes | |
| Jasmine Nabor | Chery Tiggo Crossovers | Foton Tornadoes | |
| Ma. Shaya Adorador | Chery Tiggo Crossovers | Foton Tornadoes | |
| Maria Regina Agatha Mangulabnan | UST Golden Tigresses (UAAP) | Foton Tornadoes | |
| Mary Antonette Landicho | Chery Tiggo Crossovers | Foton Tornadoes | |
| Mary Rhose Dapol^{c} | Perpetual Lady Altas (NCAA) | Foton Tornadoes | |
| May Luna | Chery Tiggo Crossovers | Foton Tornadoes | |
| Nerissa Bautista | Army Black Mamba Lady Troopers | Foton Tornadoes | |
| Seth Marione Rodriguez | Chery Tiggo Crossovers | Foton Tornadoes | |
| Sydney Niegos | (NCAA) | Foton Tornadoes | |
| Kecelyn Galdones | UST Golden Tigresses (UAAP) | Petro Gazz Angels | |
| Norielle Ipac | BaliPure Purest Water Defenders | Petro Gazz Angels | |
| Honey Royse Tubino | Army Black Mamba Lady Troopers | PLDT High Speed Hitters | |
| Venice Puzon^{d} | Lyceum Lady Pirates (NCAA) | PLDT High Speed Hitters | |
| Alyssa Bertolano | UP Fighting Maroons (UAAP) | Quezon City Gerflor Defenders | |
| Andrea Marzan | Army Black Mamba Lady Troopers | Quezon City Gerflor Defenders | |
| Carmina Aganon-Digal | Generika-Ayala Lifesavers (PSL) | Quezon City Gerflor Defenders | |
| Ethan Lainne Arce | UP Fighting Maroons (UAAP) | Quezon City Gerflor Defenders | |
| Fenela Risha Emnas | Army Black Mamba Lady Troopers | Quezon City Gerflor Defenders | |
| Ivy Jisel Perez | Army Black Mamba Lady Troopers | Quezon City Gerflor Defenders | |
| Janine Navarro | Cignal HD Spikers | Quezon City Gerflor Defenders | |
| Julia Angeles | Chery Tiggo Crossovers | Quezon City Gerflor Defenders | |
| Justine Dorog | KMS-Quezon City Lady Vikings | Quezon City Gerflor Defenders | |
| Mary Angelei Jingco | De La Salle Lady Spikers (UAAP) | Quezon City Gerflor Defenders | |
| Mary Anne Esguerra | Army Black Mamba Lady Troopers | Quezon City Gerflor Defenders | |
| Pia Sarmiento | Chery Tiggo Crossovers | Quezon City Gerflor Defenders | |
| Ranya Musa | Cignal HD Spikers | Quezon City Gerflor Defenders | |
| Rapril Aguilar | BaliPure Purest Water Defenders | Quezon City Gerflor Defenders | |
| Sarah Princess Verutiao | (NCAA) | Quezon City Gerflor Defenders | |
| Shannen Palec | Choco Mucho Flying Titans | Quezon City Gerflor Defenders | |

Note
a.The following players annotated above are current NCAA players that are competing as "guest players" to their respective teams through a special guest license (SGL) granted by the Games and Amusements Board (GAB) and honored by their collegiate league. This license allows them to play in a professional league without foregoing their remaining collegiate playing years.

== Format ==
The following format will be conducted for the entirety of the conference:

Preliminary Round

1. Single-round robin preliminaries; 2 pools; Teams are ranked using the FIVB Ranking System.
2. The top 2 teams in each pool will advance to the semifinals.
3. Teams not advancing to the semifinals will relegate to the classification round.
4. The last-placed team in Pool B will automatically be ranked 13th.

Classification

1. 11th place: A5 vs. B5
2. 9th place: A4 vs. B4
3. 7th place: A3 vs. B3

Semifinals

1. Single-round robin preliminaries; 4 local teams and 2 foreign guest teams; Teams are ranked using the FIVB Ranking System.
2. Teams from the same pool will carry over their head-to-head record.
3. The 3rd and 4th ranked teams will advance to the bronze medal match.
4. The 1st and 2nd ranked teams will advance to the winner-take-all gold medal match.

Finals

1. All games are knockout matches.
2. Bronze medal: 3rd ranked team vs. 4th ranked team
3. Gold medal: 1st ranked team vs. 2nd ranked team

== Pool standing procedure ==
- First, teams are ranked by the number of matches won.
- If the number of matches won is tied, the tied teams are then ranked by match points, wherein:
  - Match won 3–0 or 3–1: 3 match points for the winner, 0 match points for the loser.
  - Match won 3–2: 2 match points for the winner, 1 match point for the loser.
- In case of any further ties, the following criteria shall be used:
  - Set ratio: the number of sets won divided by number of sets lost.
  - Point ratio: number of points scored divided by number of points allowed.
  - Head-to-head standings: any remaining tied teams are ranked based on the results of head-to-head matches involving the teams in question.

== Preliminary round ==
- All times are Philippine Standard Time (UTC+08:00).

=== Pool A ===
| Pos | Team | Pld | W | L | Pts | SW | SL | SR | SPW | SPL | SPR | Qualification |
|---|---|---|---|---|---|---|---|---|---|---|---|---|
| 1 | Creamline Cool Smashers | 4 | 4 | 0 | 12 | 12 | 1 | 12.000 | 325 | 252 | 1.290 | Final round |
| 2 | PLDT High Speed Hitters | 4 | 3 | 1 | 8 | 9 | 5 | 1.800 | 213 | 190 | 1.121 | Final round |
| 3 | Chery Tiggo Crossovers | 4 | 2 | 2 | 6 | 8 | 8 | 1.000 | 240 | 226 | 1.062 | Classification round |
| 4 | Akari Chargers | 4 | 1 | 3 | 3 | 6 | 11 | 0.545 | 352 | 388 | 0.907 | Classification round |
| 5 | Quezon City Gerflor Defenders | 4 | 0 | 4 | 1 | 2 | 12 | 0.167 | 266 | 340 | 0.782 | Classification round |

Source: PhilSports.ph

| Date | Time | Venue | | Score | | Set 1 | Set 2 | Set 3 | Set 4 | Set 5 | Total | Report |
|---|---|---|---|---|---|---|---|---|---|---|---|---|
| Jun 27 | 18:30 | FEC | Chery Tiggo Crossovers | 0–3 | Creamline Cool Smashers | 22–25 | 22–25 | 17–25 | | | 61–75 | P2 |
| Jun 29 | 13:30 | FEC | Creamline Cool Smashers | 3–0 | Quezon City Gerflor Defenders | 25–18 | 25–11 | 25–12 | | | 75–41 | P2 |
| Jul 01 | 13:30 | FEC | PLDT High Speed Hitters | 3–0 | Akari Chargers | 25–15 | 25–19 | 25–22 | | | 75–56 | P2 |
| Jul 11 | 16:00 | PSA | Akari Chargers | 2–3 | Chery Tiggo Crossovers | 18–25 | 25–22 | 19–25 | 25–17 | 7–15 | 94–104 | P2 |
| Jul 13 | 09:30 | PSA | Quezon City Gerflor Defenders | 0–3 | Chery Tiggo Crossovers | 19–25 | 20–25 | 18–25 | | | 57–75 | P2 |
| Jul 13 | 16:00 | PSA | Creamline Cool Smashers | 3–0 | PLDT High Speed Hitters | 25–21 | 25–20 | 25–21 | | | 75–62 | P2 |
| Jul 15 | 12:00 | PSA | PLDT High Speed Hitters | 3–0 | Quezon City Gerflor Defenders | 25–18 | 25–17 | 26–24 | | | 76–59 | P2 |
| Jul 15 | 16:00 | PSA | Akari Chargers | 1–3 | Creamline Cool Smashers | 19–25 | 26–24 | 24–26 | 19–25 | | 88–100 | P2 |
| Jul 18 | 09:30 | PSA | Quezon City Gerflor Defenders | 2–3 | Akari Chargers | 20–25 | 25–22 | 25–27 | 27–25 | 12–15 | 109–114 | P2 |
| Jul 18 | 18:30 | PSA | Chery Tiggo Crossovers | 2–3 | PLDT High Speed Hitters | 21–25 | 25–16 | 23–25 | 27–25 | 12–15 | 108–106 | P2 |

=== Pool B ===
| Pos | Team | Pld | W | L | Pts | SW | SL | SR | SPW | SPL | SPR | Qualification |
|---|---|---|---|---|---|---|---|---|---|---|---|---|
| 1 | Cignal HD Spikers | 5 | 4 | 1 | 12 | 13 | 4 | 3.250 | 413 | 349 | 1.183 | Final round |
| 2 | F2 Logistics Cargo Movers | 5 | 4 | 1 | 12 | 14 | 6 | 2.333 | 462 | 432 | 1.069 | Final round |
| 3 | Choco Mucho Flying Titans | 5 | 3 | 2 | 9 | 11 | 8 | 1.375 | 416 | 367 | 1.134 | Classification round |
| 4 | Petro Gazz Angels | 5 | 3 | 2 | 9 | 12 | 9 | 1.333 | 479 | 458 | 1.046 | Classification round |
| 5 | Foton Tornadoes | 5 | 1 | 4 | 2 | 4 | 14 | 0.286 | 356 | 436 | 0.817 | Classification round |
| 6 | Farm Fresh Foxies | 5 | 0 | 5 | 1 | 2 | 15 | 0.133 | 339 | 421 | 0.805 | |

Source: PhilSports.ph

| Date | Time | Venue | | Score | | Set 1 | Set 2 | Set 3 | Set 4 | Set 5 | Total | Report |
|---|---|---|---|---|---|---|---|---|---|---|---|---|
| Jun 27 | 13:30 | FEC | Farm Fresh Foxies | 0–3 | F2 Logistics Cargo Movers | 22–25 | 20–25 | 23–25 | | | 65–75 | P2 |
| Jun 27 | 16:00 | FEC | Cignal HD Spikers | 3–1 | Petro Gazz Angels | 18–25 | 25–18 | 25–21 | 25–22 | | 93–86 | P2 |
| Jun 29 | 16:00 | FEC | Choco Mucho Flying Titans | 3–0 | Farm Fresh Foxies | 25–14 | 25–7 | 25–16 | | | 75–37 | P2 |
| Jun 29 | 18:30 | FEC | Petro Gazz Angels | 3–1 | Foton Tornadoes | 25–23 | 22–25 | 25–22 | 25–20 | | 97–90 | P2 |
| Jul 01 | 16:00 | FEC | Foton Tornadoes | 0–3 | Choco Mucho Flying Titans | 19–25 | 19–25 | 14–25 | | | 52–75 | P2 |
| Jul 01 | 18:30 | FEC | F2 Logistics Cargo Movers | 3–1 | Cignal HD Spikers | 25–20 | 30–28 | 23–25 | 25–22 | | 103–95 | P2 |
| Jul 11 | 09:30 | PSA | Petro Gazz Angels | 3–0 | Farm Fresh Foxies | 25–21 | 31–29 | 25–17 | | | 81–67 | P2 |
| Jul 11 | 12:00 | PSA | Cignal HD Spikers | 3–0 | Foton Tornadoes | 25–10 | 25–16 | 25–22 | | | 75–48 | P2 |
| Jul 11 | 18:30 | PSA | Choco Mucho Flying Titans | 2–3 | F2 Logistics Cargo Movers | 25–21 | 17–25 | 25–17 | 21–25 | 16–18 | 104–106 | P2 |
| Jul 13 | 12:00 | PSA | F2 Logistics Cargo Movers | 2–3 | Petro Gazz Angels | 25–20 | 22–25 | 12–25 | 35–33 | 9–15 | 103–118 | P2 |
| Jul 13 | 18:30 | PSA | Farm Fresh Foxies | 0–3 | Cignal HD Spikers | 18–25 | 19–25 | 18–25 | | | 55–75 | P2 |
| Jul 15 | 09:30 | PSA | Foton Tornadoes | 3–2 | Farm Fresh Foxies | 18–25 | 23–25 | 31–29 | 25–20 | 18–16 | 115–115 | P2 |
| Jul 15 | 18:30 | PSA | Petro Gazz Angels | 2–3 | Choco Mucho Flying Titans | 22–25 | 15–25 | 25–22 | 25–18 | 10–15 | 97–105 | P2 |
| Jul 18 | 12:00 | PSA | F2 Logistics Cargo Movers | 3–0 | Foton Tornadoes | 25–18 | 25–18 | 25–14 | | | 75–50 | P2 |
| Jul 18 | 16:00 | PSA | Choco Mucho Flying Titans | 0–3 | Cignal HD Spikers | 15–25 | 21–25 | 21–25 | | | 57–75 | P2 |

== Classification round ==
- All times are Philippine Standard Time (UTC+08:00).

| Date | Time | Venue | | Score | | Set 1 | Set 2 | Set 3 | Set 4 | Set 5 | Total | Report |
11th place match
| Jul 20 | 09:00 | PSA | Quezon City Gerflor Defenders | 1–3 | Foton Tornadoes | 24–26 | 25–13 | 21–25 | 24–26 | | 94–90 | P2 |
9th place match
| Jul 20 | 11:30 | PSA | Petro Gazz Angels | 3–2 | Akari Chargers | 25–19 | 25–18 | 20–25 | 20–25 | 15–7 | 105–94 | P2 |
7th place match
| Jul 22 | 09:00 | PSA | Chery Tiggo Crossovers | 0–3 | Choco Mucho Flying Titans | 20–25 | 24–26 | 15–25 | | | 59–76 | P2 |

== Final round ==
- All times are Philippine Standard Time (UTC+8:00).

=== Semifinals ===
==== Ranking ====
| Pos | Team | Pld | W | L | Pts | SW | SL | SR | SPW | SPL | SPR | Qualification |
|---|---|---|---|---|---|---|---|---|---|---|---|---|
| 1 | Kurashiki Ablaze | 5 | 5 | 0 | 15 | 15 | 3 | 5.000 | 439 | 351 | 1.251 | Championship match |
| 2 | Creamline Cool Smashers | 5 | 4 | 1 | 10 | 13 | 7 | 1.857 | 447 | 416 | 1.075 | Championship match |
| 3 | Cignal HD Spikers | 5 | 2 | 3 | 7 | 9 | 9 | 1.000 | 405 | 396 | 1.023 | 3rd place match |
| 4 | F2 Logistics Cargo Movers | 5 | 2 | 3 | 7 | 8 | 11 | 0.727 | 421 | 432 | 0.975 | 3rd place match |
| 5 | PLDT High Speed Hitters | 5 | 2 | 3 | 6 | 7 | 9 | 0.778 | 347 | 366 | 0.948 | |
| 6 | Kinh Bắc Bắc Ninh | 5 | 0 | 5 | 0 | 2 | 15 | 0.133 | 323 | 421 | 0.767 | |

Source: PhilSports.ph

==== Match results ====
| Date | Time | Venue | | Score | | Set 1 | Set 2 | Set 3 | Set 4 | Set 5 | Total | Report |
|---|---|---|---|---|---|---|---|---|---|---|---|---|
| Jul 20 | 16:00 | PSA | PLDT High Speed Hitters | 0–3 | Cignal HD Spikers | 22–25 | 15–25 | 21–25 | | | 58–75 | P2 |
| Jul 20 | 18:30 | PSA | F2 Logistics Cargo Movers | 2–3 | Creamline Cool Smashers | 25–12 | 15–25 | 25–23 | 28–30 | 7–15 | 100–105 | P2 |
| Jul 22 | 11:30 | PSA | F2 Logistics Cargo Movers | 0–3 | PLDT High Speed Hitters | 21–25 | 19–25 | 18–25 | | | 58–75 | P2 |
| Jul 22 | 16:00 | PSA | Creamline Cool Smashers | 3–2 | Cignal HD Spikers | 23–25 | 25–16 | 25–21 | 24–26 | 15–10 | 112–98 | P2 |
| Jul 22 | 18:30 | PSA | Kinh Bắc Bắc Ninh | 1–3 | Kurashiki Ablaze | 25–23 | 14–25 | 20–25 | 11–25 | | 70–98 | P2 |
| Jul 24 | 16:00 | PSA | Kurashiki Ablaze | 3–0 | Cignal HD Spikers | 25–23 | 25–16 | 25–23 | | | 75–62 | P2 |
| Jul 24 | 18:30 | PSA | PLDT High Speed Hitters | 3–0 | Kinh Bắc Bắc Ninh | 25–23 | 25–14 | 25–23 | | | 75–60 | P2 |
| Jul 25 | 16:00 | PSA | Kinh Bắc Bắc Ninh | 0–3 | Creamline Cool Smashers | 23–25 | 23–25 | 17–25 | | | 63–75 | P2 |
| Jul 25 | 18:30 | PSA | F2 Logistics Cargo Movers | 0–3 | Kurashiki Ablaze | 20–25 | 22–25 | 20–25 | | | 62–75 | P2 |
| Jul 27 | 16:00 | PSA | PLDT High Speed Hitters | 1–3 | Kurashiki Ablaze | 15–25 | 25–23 | 14–25 | 23–25 | | 77–98 | P2 |
| Jul 27 | 18:30 | PSA | Kinh Bắc Bắc Ninh | 0–3 | Cignal HD Spikers | 13–25 | 15–25 | 20–25 | | | 48–75 | P2 |
| Jul 28 | 16:00 | PSA | F2 Logistics Cargo Movers | 3–1 | Kinh Bắc Bắc Ninh | 23–25 | 25–19 | 25–18 | 25–20 | | 98–82 | P2 |
| Jul 28 | 18:30 | PSA | Kurashiki Ablaze | 3–1 | Creamline Cool Smashers | 25–20 | 25–21 | 18–25 | 25–14 | | 93–80 | P2 |

=== Finals ===
==== 3rd place match ====
| Date | Time | Venue | | Score | | Set 1 | Set 2 | Set 3 | Set 4 | Set 5 | Total | Report |
|---|---|---|---|---|---|---|---|---|---|---|---|---|
| Jul 30 | 16:00 | PSA | F2 Logistics Cargo Movers | 1–3 | Cignal HD Spikers | 22–25 | 25–23 | 20–25 | 18–25 | | 85–98 | P2 P–2 |

==== Championship match ====
| Date | Time | Venue | | Score | | Set 1 | Set 2 | Set 3 | Set 4 | Set 5 | Total | Report |
|---|---|---|---|---|---|---|---|---|---|---|---|---|
| Jul 30 | 18:30 | PSA | Kurashiki Ablaze | 3–2 | Creamline Cool Smashers | 19–25 | 25–23 | 25–19 | 20–25 | 15–13 | 104–105 | P2 P–2 |

== Final standing ==
| Rank | Team |
|---|---|
| 1st place, gold medalist(s) | Kurashiki Ablaze |
| 2nd place, silver medalist(s) | Creamline Cool Smashers |
| 3rd place, bronze medalist(s) | Cignal HD Spikers |
| 4 | F2 Logistics Cargo Movers |
| 5 | PLDT High Speed Hitters |
| 6 | Kinh Bắc Bắc Ninh |
| 7 | Choco Mucho Flying Titans |
| 8 | Chery Tiggo Crossovers |
| 9 | Petro Gazz Angels |
| 10 | Akari Chargers |
| 11 | Foton Tornadoes |
| 12 | Quezon City Gerflor Defenders |
| 13 | Farm Fresh Foxies |

2023 PVL Invitational champions
Kurashiki Ablaze
First title

Team roster
Wako Omura, Saya Taniguchi, Kyoka Ohshima (c), Sayaka Tanida, Momoka Yamashiro, Ayane Watanabe, Kaoru Takahashi, Yukino Yano, Akane Hiraoka, Asaka Tamaru, Miho Kawamura, Kaho Bessho, Saki Tanabe, Mihaya Hata, Reina Fujiwara, Nana Fujiwara, Kokoro Taiko, Honoka Okuda
Head coach
Hideo Suzuki

== Awards and medalists ==
=== Individual awards ===
| Award | Player | Team | Ref. |
|---|---|---|---|
| Conference Most Valuable Player | Frances Molina | Cignal | |
| Finals Most Valuable Player | Kyoka Ohshima | Kurashiki Ablaze | |
| 1st Best Outside Spiker | Tamaru Asaka | Kurashiki Ablaze | |
| 2nd Best Outside Spiker | Alyssa Valdez | Creamline | |
| 1st Best Middle Blocker | Majoy Baron | F2 Logistics | |
| 2nd Best Middle Blocker | Celine Domingo | Creamline | |
| Best Opposite Spiker | Tots Carlos | Creamline | |
| Best Setter | Gel Cayuna | Cignal | |
| Best Libero | Kath Arado | PLDT | |

=== Medalists ===
| Gold | Silver | Bronze |
|---|---|---|
| Kurashiki Ablaze Kyoka Ohshima (c); Akane Hiraoka; Asaka Tamaru; Ayane Watanabe (L); Bessho Kaho; Kaoru Takahashi (L); Mihaya Hata; Miho Kawamura; Momoka Yamashiro (L); Nana Fujimura (L); Reina Fujiwara; Saki Tanabe; Saya Taniguchi; Sayaka Tanida; Takio Kokoro; Wako Omura; Yukino Yano Head coach: Hideo Suzuki | Creamline Cool Smashers Alyssa Valdez(c); Julia Melissa Morado-De Guzman; Celine Domingo; Risa Sato; Jeanette Panaga; Diana Mae Carlos; Michele Gumabao; Jorella Marie De Jesus (L); Lorielyn Bernardo; Maria Paulina Soriano; Kyla Atienza (L); Fille Cainglet-Cayetano; Kyle Negrito; Rizza Jane Mandapat; Rosemarie Vargas; Jessica Margarett Galanza; Bernadeth Pons Head coach: Sherwin Meneses | Cignal HD Spikers Rachel Daquis (c); Glaudine Troncoso; Roselyn Doria; Geneveve Casugod; Vanie Gandler; Frances Xinia Molina; Jovelyn Gonzaga; Fatima Bia General; Toni Rose Basas; Jacqueline Acuña; Gyzelle Sy; Angelique Beatrice Dionela (L); Jerilli Malabanan; Marivic Velaine Meneses; Anngela Nunag (L); Gel Cayuna; Grazielle Ann Bombita Head coach: Cesael Delos Santos |

== Statistics leaders ==
Statistics leaders correct at the end of the preliminary round.

Best Scorers
| Rank | Name | Points |
|---|---|---|
| 1 | Sisi Rondina | 104 |
| 2 | Grethcel Soltones | 101 |
| 3 | Frances Molina | 85 |
| 4 | Kim Kianna Dy | 76 |
| 5 | Jonah Sabete | 76 |

Best Spikers
| Rank | Name | %Eff |
|---|---|---|
| 1 | Diana Mae Carlos | 47.79 |
| 2 | Sisi Rondina | 39.57 |
| 3 | Jonah Sabete | 39.13 |
| 4 | Jovelyn Gonzaga | 34.06 |
| 5 | Grethcel Soltones | 33.21 |

Best Blockers
| Rank | Name | Avg |
|---|---|---|
| 1 | Cherry Rose Nunag | 0.79 |
| 2 | Jaila Marie Atienza | 0.78 |
| 3 | Celine Domingo | 0.77 |
| 4 | Mylene Paat | 0.69 |
| 5 | Marivic Meneses | 0.65 |

Best Servers
| Rank | Name | Avg |
|---|---|---|
| 1 | Jema Galanza | 0.62 |
| 2 | Jia De Guzman | 0.62 |
| 3 | Alyssa Bertolano | 0.43 |
| 4 | Roselyn Doria | 0.41 |
| 5 | Mylene Paat | 0.38 |

Best Diggers
| Rank | Name | Avg |
|---|---|---|
| 1 | Dawn Macandili | 5.85 |
| 2 | Kath Arado | 5.71 |
| 3 | Cae Jelean Lazo | 3.65 |
| 4 | Cienne Cruz | 3.10 |
| 5 | Jovelyn Gonzaga | 2.88 |

Best Setters
| Rank | Name | Avg |
|---|---|---|
| 1 | Jia De Guzman | 5.69 |
| 2 | Gel Cayuna | 5.00 |
| 3 | Rhea Dimaculangan | 3.79 |
| 4 | Deanna Wong | 3.63 |
| 5 | Djanel Welch Cheng | 3.29 |

Best Receivers
| Rank | Name | %Succ |
|---|---|---|
| 1 | Kath Arado | 51.90 |
| 2 | Alyssa Bertolano | 44.78 |
| 3 | Kate Santiago | 41.74 |
| 4 | Cienne Cruz | 39.23 |
| 5 | Ejiya Laure | 37.21 |
