= 2023 Premier Volleyball League season =

Sixth season of the Premier Volleyball League

- League: Premier Volleyball League
- Sport: Volleyball
- Duration: February 4 – December 16, 2023
- TV partner(s): One Sports; Cignal TV

Conferences
- First All-Filipino champions: Creamline
- First All-Filipino runners-up: Petro Gazz
- Invitational champions: Kurashiki Ablaze
- Invitational runners-up: Creamline
- Second All-Filipino champions: Creamline
- Second All-Filipino runners-up: Choco Mucho

PVL seasons
- ← 2022 2024–25 →

The 2023 Premier Volleyball League (PVL) season was the seventh (Note: Considered as the sixth season of the PVL by its organizers at the time. The succeeding 2024–25 season was later considered as the eight season.) season of the Premier Volleyball League. The season started on February 4, 2023 with the beginning of the 2023 First All-Filipino Conference and ended on December 16, 2023 with the conclusion of the 2023 Second All-Filipino Conference.

This was the final season to use the old calendar that ran through a full calendar year. To align with the FIVB calendar, the following season was extended to include a fourth conference that served as the transition to the current June-to-May calendar.

== First All-Filipino conference ==
The 2023 Premier Volleyball League First All-Filipino Conference (Note: Known as the All-Filipino Conference at the time of competition. Retroactively designated as the First All-Filipino Conference after the introduction of the Second All-Filipino Conference.) was the fourteenth conference of the Premier Volleyball League and its fifth conference as a professional league. The tournament began on February 4, 2023, at the Smart Araneta Coliseum, Quezon City.

Formerly known as the Open Conference, the conference was rebranded as the "All-Filipino Conference" to better reflect the fact that the tournament's participation is restricted to Filipino players, including Filipino-Foreigners.

=== Participating teams ===
2023 Premier Volleyball League First All-Filipino Conference
Abbr.	Team	Affiliation	Head coach	Team captain
AKA	Akari Chargers	Akari Lighting & Technology Corporation	(Brazil) Jorge Edson	Michelle Cobb
ABM	Army Black Mamba Lady Troopers	Philippine Army / Corbridge Group Philippines	(Philippines) Randy Fallorina	Anngela Nunag
CTC	Chery Tiggo Crossovers	United Asia Automotive Group, Inc.	(Philippines) Aaron Velez	Mylene Paat
CMF	Choco Mucho Flying Titans	Republic Biscuit Corporation	(Philippines) Dante Alinsunurin	Bea de Leon
CHD	Cignal HD Spikers	Cignal TV, Inc.	(Philippines) Shaq Delos Santos	Rachel Daquis
CCS	Creamline Cool Smashers	Republic Biscuit Corporation	(Philippines) Sherwin Meneses	Jia Morado (interim)
FTL	F2 Logistics Cargo Movers	F2 Logistics Philippines	(Philippines) Regine Diego	Aby Maraño
PGA	Petro Gazz Angels	PetroGazz Ventures Phils. Corp.	(Philippines) Oliver Almadro	Chie Saet
HSH	PLDT High Speed Hitters	PLDT Inc.	(Philippines) Rald Ricafort	Mika Reyes

=== Preliminary round ===
Pos	Team	Pld	W	L	Pts	SW	SL	SR	SPW	SPL	SPR	Qualification
1	Creamline Cool Smashers	8	7	1	22	23	5	4.600	674	509	1.324	Final round
2	Petro Gazz Angels	8	6	2	19	20	7	2.857	651	550	1.184	Final round
3	PLDT High Speed Hitters	8	6	2	18	20	10	2.000	697	613	1.137	Final round
4	F2 Logistics Cargo Movers	8	6	2	16	18	12	1.500	646	653	0.989	Final round
5	Chery Tiggo Crossovers	8	4	4	13	15	13	1.154	633	595	1.064	
6	Cignal HD Spikers	8	3	5	8	9	17	0.529	616	660	0.933	
7	Choco Mucho Flying Titans	8	2	6	6	10	20	0.500	613	696	0.881	
8	Akari Power Chargers	8	2	6	5	8	21	0.381	590	705	0.837	
9	Army Black Mamba Lady Troopers	8	0	8	1	5	24	0.208	532	708	0.751	

=== Final round ===
Semifinals
March 18–21
1 Creamline	3	3
4 F2 Logistics	1	0
March 18–23
2 Petro Gazz	3	1	3
3 PLDT	1	3	0

Championship
March 26–30
Creamline	1	3	3
Petro Gazz	3	2	1
3rd place match
March 26–28
F2 Logistics	3	3
PLDT	1	1

=== Final standings ===
Rank	Team
1st place, gold medalist(s)	Creamline Cool Smashers
2nd place, silver medalist(s)	Petro Gazz Angels
3rd place, bronze medalist(s)	F2 Logistics Cargo Movers
4	PLDT High Speed Hitters
5	Chery Tiggo Crossovers
6	Cignal HD Spikers
7	Choco Mucho Flying Titans
8	Akari Power Chargers
9	Army Black Mamba Lady Troopers

=== Awards ===
Award	Player	Team	Ref.
Conference Most Valuable Player	Tots Carlos	Creamline	
Finals Most Valuable Player	Jia De Guzman	Creamline	
1st Best Outside Spiker	Tots Carlos	Creamline	
2nd Best Outside Spiker	Jema Galanza	Creamline	
1st Best Middle Blocker	Remy Palma	Petro Gazz	
2nd Best Middle Blocker	Mar-Jana Phillips	Petro Gazz	
Best Opposite Spiker	Michele Gumabao	Creamline	
Best Setter	Jia De Guzman	Creamline	
Best Libero	Kath Arado	PLDT	

== Invitational conference ==
The 2023 Premier Volleyball League Invitational Conference was the fifteenth conference of the Premier Volleyball League and its six conference as a professional league. The tournament was originally scheduled to start on June 6, 2023, however, it was moved to June 27, 2023, due to the Philippines women's national volleyball team competing at the 2023 Asian Women's Volleyball Challenge Cup.

This conference introduced three debuting teams in the league — Farm Fresh Foxies and Quezon City Gerflor Defenders as newly formed teams, and the return of Foton Tornadoes in the Filipino volleyball scene after the original team was rebranded as Chery Tiggo Crossovers in 2020. Philippine Army Lady Troopers is skipping this conference due to military training to most of its players. Two foreign teams, Kurashiki Ablaze of Japan and Kinh Bắc Bắc Ninh of Vietnam, also participated in the conference.

With these new additions alongside the two foreign guest teams, this is the first conference of the PVL that has more than ten participating corporate teams. Moreover, this is also the most contested conference of the league, by having thirteen teams — the most by any conference so far.

=== Participating teams ===
2023 Premier Volleyball League Invitational Conference
Abbr.	Team	Affiliation	Head coach	Team captain
Local teams
AKA	Akari Chargers	Akari Lighting & Technology	(Brazil) Jorge Edson	(Philippines) Michelle Cobb
CTC	Chery Tiggo Crossovers	United Asia Automotive Group	(Philippines) Aaron Velez	(Philippines) Mylene Paat
CMF	Choco Mucho Flying Titans	Republic Biscuit Corporation	(Philippines) Dante Alinsunurin	(Philippines) Bea de Leon
CHD	Cignal HD Spikers	Cignal TV, Inc.	(Philippines) Shaq Delos Santos	(Philippines) Rachel Anne Daquis
CCS	Creamline Cool Smashers	Republic Biscuit Corporation	(Philippines) Sherwin Meneses	(Philippines) Alyssa Valdez
FTL	F2 Logistics Cargo Movers	F2 Logistics Philippines	(Philippines) Regine Diego	(Philippines) Aby Maraño
FFF	Farm Fresh Foxies	Farm Fresh Philippine International	(Philippines) Jerry Yee	(Philippines) Cloanne Mondoñedo
FOT	Foton Tornadoes	United Asia Automotive Group	(Philippines) Brian Esquibel	(Philippines) Shaya Adorador
PGA	Petro Gazz Angels	PetroGazz Ventures Phils.	(Philippines) Oliver Almadro	(Philippines) Chie Saet
HSH	PLDT High Speed Hitters	PLDT Inc.	(Philippines) Rald Ricafort	(Philippines) Mika Reyes
GFD	Quezon City Gerflor Defenders	Gerflor Philippines / Quezon City Sports Management Services	(Philippines) Edgar Barroga	(Philippines) Justine Dorog
Foreign teams
KBB	Kinh Bắc Bắc Ninh	Volleyball Vietnam League	(Vietnam) Phạm Văn Long	(Vietnam) Nguyễn Thị Kiều Oanh
KUR	Kurashiki Ablaze	Ablaze Co., Ltd. / V.League (Japan)	(Japan) Hideo Suzuki	(Japan) Ohshima Kyoka

=== Preliminary round ===
==== Pool A ====
Pos	Team	Pld	W	L	Pts	SW	SL	SR	SPW	SPL	SPR	Qualification
1	Creamline Cool Smashers	4	4	0	12	12	1	12.000	325	252	1.290	Final round
2	PLDT High Speed Hitters	4	3	1	8	9	5	1.800	213	190	1.121	Final round
3	Chery Tiggo Crossovers	4	2	2	6	8	8	1.000	240	226	1.062	Classification round
4	Akari Chargers	4	1	3	3	6	11	0.545	352	388	0.907	Classification round
5	Quezon City Gerflor Defenders	4	0	4	1	2	12	0.167	266	340	0.782	Classification round

Source: PhilSports.ph

==== Pool B ====
Pos	Team	Pld	W	L	Pts	SW	SL	SR	SPW	SPL	SPR	Qualification
1	Cignal HD Spikers	5	4	1	12	13	4	3.250	413	349	1.183	Final round
2	F2 Logistics Cargo Movers	5	4	1	12	14	6	2.333	462	432	1.069	Final round
3	Choco Mucho Flying Titans	5	3	2	9	11	8	1.375	416	367	1.134	Classification round
4	Petro Gazz Angels	5	3	2	9	12	9	1.333	479	458	1.046	Classification round
5	Foton Tornadoes	5	1	4	2	4	14	0.286	356	436	0.817	Classification round
6	Farm Fresh Foxies	5	0	5	1	2	15	0.133	339	421	0.805	

Source: PhilSports.ph

=== Classification round ===
Date	Time	Venue		Score		Set 1	Set 2	Set 3	Set 4	Set 5	Total	Report
11th place match
Jul 20	09:00	PSA	Quezon City Gerflor Defenders	1–3	Foton Tornadoes	24–26	25–13	21–25	24–26		94–90	P2
9th place match
Jul 20	11:30	PSA	Petro Gazz Angels	3–2	Akari Chargers	25–19	25–18	20–25	20–25	15–7	105–94	P2
7th place match
Jul 22	09:00	PSA	Chery Tiggo Crossovers	0–3	Choco Mucho Flying Titans	20–25	24–26	15–25			59–76	P2

=== Final round ===
==== Semifinals ====
Pos	Team	Pld	W	L	Pts	SW	SL	SR	SPW	SPL	SPR	Qualification
1	Kurashiki Ablaze	5	5	0	15	15	3	5.000	439	351	1.251	Championship match
2	Creamline Cool Smashers	5	4	1	10	13	7	1.857	447	416	1.075	Championship match
3	Cignal HD Spikers	5	2	3	7	9	9	1.000	405	396	1.023	3rd place match
4	F2 Logistics Cargo Movers	5	2	3	7	8	11	0.727	421	432	0.975	3rd place match
5	PLDT High Speed Hitters	5	2	3	6	7	9	0.778	347	366	0.948	
6	Kinh Bắc Bắc Ninh	5	0	5	0	2	15	0.133	323	421	0.767	

Source: PhilSports.ph

==== Finals ====
===== 3rd place match =====
Date	Time	Venue		Score		Set 1	Set 2	Set 3	Set 4	Set 5	Total	Report
Jul 30	16:00	PSA	F2 Logistics Cargo Movers	1–3	Cignal HD Spikers	22–25	25–23	20–25	18–25		85–98	P2 P–2

===== Championship =====
Date	Time	Venue		Score		Set 1	Set 2	Set 3	Set 4	Set 5	Total	Report
Jul 30	18:30	PSA	Kurashiki Ablaze	3–2	Creamline Cool Smashers	19–25	25–23	25–19	20–25	15–13	104–105	P2 P–2

=== Final standings ===
Rank	Team
1st place, gold medalist(s)	Kurashiki Ablaze
2nd place, silver medalist(s)	Creamline Cool Smashers
3rd place, bronze medalist(s)	Cignal HD Spikers
4	F2 Logistics Cargo Movers
5	PLDT High Speed Hitters
6	Kinh Bắc Bắc Ninh
7	Choco Mucho Flying Titans
8	Chery Tiggo Crossovers
9	Petro Gazz Angels
10	Akari Chargers
11	Foton Tornadoes
12	Quezon City Gerflor Defenders
13	Farm Fresh Foxies

=== Awards ===
Award	Player	Team	Ref.
Conference Most Valuable Player	Frances Molina	Cignal	
Finals Most Valuable Player	Kyoka Ohshima	Kurashiki Ablaze	
1st Best Outside Spiker	Tamaru Asaka	Kurashiki Ablaze	
2nd Best Outside Spiker	Alyssa Valdez	Creamline	
1st Best Middle Blocker	Majoy Baron	F2 Logistics	
2nd Best Middle Blocker	Celine Domingo	Creamline	
Best Opposite Spiker	Tots Carlos	Creamline	
Best Setter	Angelica Cayuna	Cignal	
Best Libero	Kath Arado	PLDT	

== Second All-Filipino conference ==
The 2023 Premier Volleyball League Second All-Filipino Conference was the sixteenth conference of the Premier Volleyball League. The tournament began on October 15, 2023. This tournament was set to be the second post-pandemic import-laden conference known as the 2023 Premier Volleyball League Reinforced Conference, with the Angels set to defend their crown, but was made into a second All-Filipino Conference as a consequence of sanctions from the Philippine National Volleyball Federation.

The conference not only marked the arrival of two debuting teams – Nxled Chameleons, the sister team of Akari Chargers, and Galeries Tower Highrisers, but it also marked the return of using a cross-over format for the semifinals which was last implemented on the same conference earlier this year which is the 2023 Premier Volleyball League First All-Filipino Conference. Meanwhile the Foton Tornadoes withdrew from the PVL. This is the first conference of the league catering to the most local club teams with twelve.

=== Due to PNVF sanctions ===
The tournament was originally planned to be organized as the Reinforced Conference and was meant to feature teams reinforced by an import or a foreign player. However, the Philippine National Volleyball Federation penalized the PVL for violating Article 6.1.1.b of the FIVB Regulations 2022 which states that the national team period should be prioritized by professional leagues. However, the league proceeded with the opening of the Invitational Conference on June 27.

The FIVB has allowed the PVL to organize a third conference but the PNVF will not be able to issue international transfer certificates which would allow clubs to sign in foreign players for the tournament.

=== Timeout ===
The timeout regulations was changed starting from this conference in a bid to minimize match duration. A technical timeout lasting from one to two minutes will come to effect when one team reaches 13 points. Teams will have one regular timeout and another 30-second timeout for each set.

=== Participating teams ===
2023 Premier Volleyball League Second All-Filipino Conference
Abbr.	Team	Affiliation	Head coach	Team captain
AKA	Akari Chargers	Akari Lighting & Technology	(Brazil) Jorge Edson	Michelle Cobb
CTC	Chery Tiggo Crossovers	United Asia Automotive Group	(Philippines) Aaron Velez	EJ Laure
CMF	Choco Mucho Flying Titans	Republic Biscuit Corporation	(Philippines) Dante Alinsunurin	Bea de Leon
CHD	Cignal HD Spikers	Cignal TV, Inc.	(Philippines) Shaq Delos Santos	Frances Molina
CCS	Creamline Cool Smashers	Republic Biscuit Corporation	(Philippines) Sherwin Meneses	Alyssa Valdez
FFF	Farm Fresh Foxies	Farm Fresh Philippine International / Strong Group Athletics	(Philippines) Jerry Yee	Louie Romero
FTL	F2 Logistics Cargo Movers	F2 Logistics Philippines	(Philippines) Regine Diego	Aby Maraño
GTH	Galeries Tower Highrisers	Grand Taipan Land Development	(Philippines) Lerma Giron	Fenela Emnas
NXL	Nxled Chameleons	Akari Lighting & Technology	(Japan) Taka Minowa	Dani Ravena
PGA	PetroGazz Angels	PetroGazz Ventures Phils.	(Philippines) Timmy Santo Tomas	Chie Saet
HSH	PLDT High Speed Hitters	PLDT Inc.	(Philippines) Rald Ricafort	Mika Reyes
GFD	Quezon City Gerflor Defenders	Gerflor Philippines / Quezon City Sports Management Services	(Philippines) Sammy Acaylar	Pia Sarmiento

=== Preliminary round ===
Pos	Team	Pld	W	L	Pts	SW	SL	SR	SPW	SPL	SPR	Qualification
1	Creamline Cool Smashers	11	11	0	32	33	7	4.714	977	786	1.243	Final round
2	Choco Mucho Flying Titans	11	10	1	29	31	7	4.429	899	724	1.242	Final round
3	Cignal HD Spikers	11	8	3	25	26	15	1.733	947	842	1.125	Final round
4	Chery Tiggo Crossovers	11	8	3	22	26	16	1.625	851	809	1.052	Final round
5	PLDT High Speed Hitters	11	7	4	21	25	15	1.667	914	901	1.014	
6	Petro Gazz Angels	11	6	5	20	25	17	1.471	941	900	1.046	
7	Akari Chargers	11	5	6	14	19	22	0.864	912	922	0.989	
8	F2 Logistics Cargo Movers	11	4	7	13	18	23	0.783	790	780	1.013	
9	Nxled Chameleons	11	4	7	12	14	23	0.609	786	851	0.924	
10	Farm Fresh Foxies	11	2	9	7	13	28	0.464	878	933	0.941	
11	Galeries Tower Highrisers	11	1	10	2	6	32	0.188	704	925	0.761	
12	Quezon City Gerflor Defenders	11	0	11	1	2	33	0.061	531	857	0.620	

Source: PhilSports.ph

=== Final round ===
Semifinals
December 7–9
1 Creamline	3	3
4 Chery Tiggo	0	0
December 7–12
2 Choco Mucho	2	3	3
3 Cignal	3	0	1

Championship
December 14–16
Creamline	3	3
Choco Mucho	1	2
3rd place match
December 14–16
Chery Tiggo	1	1
Cignal	3	3

=== Final standings ===
Rank	Team
1st place, gold medalist(s)	Creamline Cool Smashers
2nd place, silver medalist(s)	Choco Mucho Flying Titans
3rd place, bronze medalist(s)	Cignal HD Spikers
4	Chery Tiggo Crossovers
5	PLDT High Speed Hitters
6	Petro Gazz Angels
7	Akari Chargers
8	F2 Logistics Cargo Movers
9	Nxled Chameleons
10	Farm Fresh Foxies
11	Galeries Tower Highrisers
12	Quezon City Gerflor Defenders

=== Awards ===
Award	Player	Team	Ref.
Conference Most Valuable Player	Sisi Rondina	Choco Mucho	
Finals Most Valuable Player	Tots Carlos	Creamline	
1st Best Outside Spiker	Ejiya Laure	Chery Tiggo	
2nd Best Outside Spiker	Jema Galanza	Creamline	
1st Best Middle Blocker	Jeanette Panaga	Creamline	
2nd Best Middle Blocker	Ria Meneses	Cignal	
Best Opposite Spiker	Michele Gumabao	Creamline	
Best Setter	Gel Cayuna	Cignal	
Best Libero	Tonnie Rose Ponce	Choco Mucho	

== Conference results ==
Conference	Champion	Runner-up	3rd	4th	5th	6th	7th	8th	9th	10th	11th	12th	13th
First All-Filipino	Creamline	Petro Gazz	F2 Logistics	PLDT	Chery Tiggo	Cignal	Choco Mucho	Akari	Army Black Mamba	—N/a			
Invitational	Kurashiki	Creamline	Cignal	F2 Logistics	PLDT	Kinh Bắc Bắc Ninh	Choco Mucho	Chery Tiggo	Petro Gazz	Akari	Foton	Gerflor	Farm Fresh
Second All-Filipino	Creamline	Choco Mucho	Cignal	Chery Tiggo	PLDT	Petro Gazz	Akari	F2 Logistics	Nxled	Farm Fresh	Galeries Tower	Gerflor	—N/a

== See also ==
- 2023 Spikers' Turf season
