= 2023 Premier Volleyball League First All-Filipino Conference =

First conference of the 2023 PVL season

- Duration: February 4 – March 30, 2023
- Teams: 9
- Matches: 46
- Attendance: 193,234 (4,201 per match)
- TV partner(s): One Sports; One Sports+

Results
- Champions: Creamline Cool Smashers
- Runners-up: Petro Gazz Angels
- Third place: F2 Logistics Cargo Movers
- Fourth place: PLDT High Speed Hitters

Awards
- Conference MVP: Tots Carlos
- Finals MVP: Jia De Guzman
- Best OH: Tots Carlos; Jessica Galanza
- Best MB: Remy Palma; MJ Phillips
- Best OPP: Michele Gumabao
- Best Setter: Jia De Guzman
- Best Libero: Kath Arado

PVL All-Filipino Conference chronology
- < 2022 (Open) 2023 Second >

PVL conference chronology
- < 2022 Reinforced 2023 Invitational >

The 2023 Premier Volleyball League First All-Filipino Conference (Note: Known as the All-Filipino Conference at the time of competition. Retroactively designated as the First All-Filipino Conference after the introduction of the Second All-Filipino Conference.) was the fourteenth conference of the Premier Volleyball League and its fifth conference as a professional league. The tournament began on February 4, 2023, at the Smart Araneta Coliseum, Quezon City.

Formerly known as the Open Conference, the conference was rebranded as the "All-Filipino Conference" to better reflect the fact that the tournament's participation is restricted to Filipino players, including Filipino-Foreigners.

== Participating teams ==
2023 Premier Volleyball League First All-Filipino Conference
Abbr.	Team	Affiliation	Head coach	Team captain
AKA	Akari Chargers	Akari Lighting & Technology Corporation	(Brazil) Jorge Edson	Michelle Cobb
ABM	Army Black Mamba Lady Troopers	Philippine Army / Corbridge Group Philippines	(Philippines) Randy Fallorina	Anngela Nunag
CTC	Chery Tiggo Crossovers	United Asia Automotive Group, Inc.	(Philippines) Aaron Velez	Mylene Paat
CMF	Choco Mucho Flying Titans	Republic Biscuit Corporation	(Philippines) Dante Alinsunurin	Bea de Leon
CHD	Cignal HD Spikers	Cignal TV, Inc.	(Philippines) Shaq Delos Santos	Rachel Daquis
CCS	Creamline Cool Smashers	Republic Biscuit Corporation	(Philippines) Sherwin Meneses	Jia Morado (interim)
FTL	F2 Logistics Cargo Movers	F2 Logistics Philippines	(Philippines) Regine Diego	Aby Maraño
PGA	Petro Gazz Angels	PetroGazz Ventures Phils. Corp.	(Philippines) Oliver Almadro	Chie Saet
HSH	PLDT High Speed Hitters	PLDT Inc.	(Philippines) Rald Ricafort	Mika Reyes

== Venues ==
This conference considered hosting games again outside of Metro Manila such as in Lucena, Iloilo City, and Cagayan de Oro, like in previous seasons from 2019 and prior. As of February 3, the league was set to arrange games in Iloilo City on March 14.

Preliminaries
Quezon City	San Juan City	Iloilo City
Araneta Coliseum	Filoil EcoOil Centre	University of San Agustin Gymnasium
Capacity: 20,000	Capacity: 6,000	Capacity: 3,000
Preliminaries, semifinals	Semifinals, finals	
Pasig City	Pasay City	
PhilSports Arena	SM Mall of Asia Arena	
Capacity: 10,000	Capacity: 20,000	

== Transactions ==
=== National team players ===
The following players who played in the 2022 Asian Women's Volleyball Cup and the 2022 ASEAN Grand Prix are solely the players from Creamline Cool Smashers.

Team	Outside hitters	Middle blockers	Opposite spikers	Setters	Liberos
Creamline Cool Smashers	Fille Cainglet-Cayetano	Lorie Lyn Bernardo	Tots Carlos	Jia De Guzman	Kyla Atienza
Creamline Cool Smashers	Jema Galanza	Celine Domingo	Michele Gumabao	Kyle Negrito	Ella de Jesus
Creamline Cool Smashers	Rosemarie Vargas	Jeanette Panaga	Rizza Jane Mandapat	—N/a	—N/a
Creamline Cool Smashers	—N/a	Risa Sato	—N/a	—N/a	—N/a
Creamline Cool Smashers	—N/a	Pau Soriano	—N/a	—N/a	—N/a

=== Team additions and transfers ===
The following are the players who were newly added and/or transferred to another team for the upcoming conference.

Player	Moving from	Moving to	Ref.
Aleona Denise Santiago-Manabat	Chery Tiggo Crossovers	Akari Power Chargers	
Bang Pineda	Petro Gazz Angels	Akari Power Chargers	
Christine Joy Soyud	PLDT High Speed Hitters	Akari Power Chargers	
Camille Victoria	UST Golden Tigresses (UAAP)	Akari Power Chargers	
Andrea Marzan	Akari Power Chargers	Army Black Mamba Lady Troopers	
Alexa Polidario	Abanse Negrense	Army Black Mamba Lady Troopers	
Princess Bello	Arellano Lady Chiefs (NCAA)	Army Black Mamba Lady Troopers	
Bingle Landicho	Akari Power Chargers	Chery Tiggo Crossovers	
Pauline Marie Monique Gaston	Choco Mucho Flying Titans	Chery Tiggo Crossovers	
Seth Marione Rodriguez	Petro Gazz Angels	Chery Tiggo Crossovers	
Geneveve Casugod	Akari Power Chargers	Cignal HD Spikers	
Gyzelle Sy	Imus City-AJAA Lady Spikers	Cignal HD Spikers	
Toni Rose Basas	PLDT High Speed Hitters	Cignal HD Spikers	
Chinnie Arroyo	NU Lady Bulldogs (UAAP)	F2 Logistics Cargo Movers	
Myla Pablo	Petro Gazz Angels	F2 Logistics Cargo Movers	
Maria Lourdes Clemente	F2 Logistics Cargo Movers	Petro Gazz Angels	
Angeline Marie Gervacio	F2 Logistics Cargo Movers	Petro Gazz Angels	
Heather Guino-o	PLDT High Speed Hitters	Petro Gazz Angels	
Jellie Tempiatura	KMS-Quezon City Lady Vikings	Petro Gazz Angels	
Michelle Morente	Army Black Mamba Lady Troopers	PLDT High Speed Hitters	
Ysabel Jamie Jimenez	UST Golden Tigresses (UAAP)	PLDT High Speed Hitters	

=== Coaching changes ===
Team	Outgoing coach	Manner of departure	Replaced by	Ref
Army Black Mamba Lady Troopers	(Philippines) Emilio Reyes Jr.	Retired as Army personnel	(Philippines) Randy Fallorina	
Chery Tiggo Crossovers	(Philippines) Clarence Esteban	Replaced	(Philippines) Aaron Velez	
Choco Mucho Flying Titans	(Philippines) Edjet Mabbayad	Reassigned	(Philippines) Dante Alinsunurin	
F2 Logistics Cargo Movers	(Philippines) Benson Bocboc	Reassigned	(Philippines) Regine Diego	
Petro Gazz Angels	(Philippines) Rald Ricafort	Resigned	(Philippines) Oliver Almadro	
PLDT High Speed Hitters	(Philippines) George Pascua	Replaced	(Philippines) Rald Ricafort	

== Format ==
Originally, the semifinal format was a single round-robin tournament. However, the league reverted to its most used format — a crossover best-of-3 series between the 1st and 4th, and 2nd and 3rd ranked teams.

Preliminary Round

1. The nine teams will compete in a single round-robin elimination.
2. Teams are ranked using the FIVB Ranking System.
3. Top four teams will advance to the semifinals.

Semifinals

1. Best-of-three series.
2. 1st ranked team vs. 4th ranked team
3. 2nd ranked team vs. 3rd ranked team

Finals

1. Best-of-three series.
2. Bronze medal: SF1 loser vs. SF2 loser
3. Gold medal: SF1 winner vs. SF2 Wwnner

== Pool standing procedure ==
- First, teams are ranked by the number of matches won.
- If the number of matches won is tied, the tied teams are then ranked by match points, wherein:
  - Match won 3–0 or 3–1: 3 match points for the winner, 0 match points for the loser.
  - Match won 3–2: 2 match points for the winner, 1 match point for the loser.
- In case of any further ties, the following criteria shall be used:
  - Set ratio: the number of sets won divided by number of sets lost.
  - Point ratio: number of points scored divided by number of points allowed.
  - Head-to-head standings: any remaining tied teams are ranked based on the results of head-to-head matches involving the teams in question.

== Preliminary round ==
- All times are Philippine Standard Time (UTC+8:00).

=== Ranking ===
Pos	Team	Pld	W	L	Pts	SW	SL	SR	SPW	SPL	SPR	Qualification
1	Creamline Cool Smashers	8	7	1	22	23	5	4.600	674	509	1.324	Final round
2	Petro Gazz Angels	8	6	2	19	20	7	2.857	651	550	1.184	Final round
3	PLDT High Speed Hitters	8	6	2	18	20	10	2.000	697	613	1.137	Final round
4	F2 Logistics Cargo Movers	8	6	2	16	18	12	1.500	646	653	0.989	Final round
5	Chery Tiggo Crossovers	8	4	4	13	15	13	1.154	633	595	1.064	
6	Cignal HD Spikers	8	3	5	8	9	17	0.529	616	660	0.933	
7	Choco Mucho Flying Titans	8	2	6	6	10	20	0.500	613	696	0.881	
8	Akari Power Chargers	8	2	6	5	8	21	0.381	590	705	0.837	
9	Army Black Mamba Lady Troopers	8	0	8	1	5	24	0.208	532	708	0.751	

=== Match results ===
Date	Time	Venue		Score		Set 1	Set 2	Set 3	Set 4	Set 5	Total	Report
04 Feb	16:00	SAC	Akari Power Chargers	0–3	Choco Mucho Flying Titans	15–25	20–25	20–25			55–75	P2
04 Feb	18:00	SAC	Creamline Cool Smashers	3–0	Petro Gazz Angels	25–18	25–20	25–22			75–60	P2
07 Feb	16:00	PSA	PLDT High Speed Hitters	2–3	F2 Logistics Cargo Movers	22–25	21–25	25–14	25–20	14–16	107–100	P2
07 Feb	18:00	PSA	Chery Tiggo Crossovers	3–0	Cignal HD Spikers	27–25	25–19	25–22			77–66	P2
09 Feb	16:00	FEC	Creamline Cool Smashers	3–0	Cignal HD Spikers	25–16	25–21	25–15			75–52	P2
09 Feb	18:00	FEC	Petro Gazz Angels	3–0	Choco Mucho Flying Titans	25–18	25–20	25–21			75–59	P2
11 Feb	16:00	PSA	Chery Tiggo Crossovers	3–1	Army Black Mamba Lady Troopers	25–21	23–25	25–16	25–12		98–74	P2
11 Feb	18:00	PSA	Akari Power Chargers	0–3	F2 Logistics Cargo Movers	22–25	23–25	18–25			63–75	P2
14 Feb	16:00	SAC	Cignal HD Spikers	3–0	Akari Power Chargers	25–23	25–20	25–14			75–57	P2
14 Feb	18:00	SAC	Choco Mucho Flying Titans	0–3	Creamline Cool Smashers	18–25	13–25	14–25			45–75	P2
16 Feb	16:00	PSA	F2 Logistics Cargo Movers	0–3	Chery Tiggo Crossovers	19–25	14–25	16–25			49–75	P2
16 Feb	18:00	PSA	Army Black Mamba Lady Troopers	0–3	PLDT High Speed Hitters	19–25	12–25	21–25			52–75	P2
18 Feb	16:00	PSA	Cignal HD Spikers	0–3	Petro Gazz Angels	26–28	18–25	13–25			57–78	P2
18 Feb	18:00	PSA	F2 Logistics Cargo Movers	3–2	Creamline Cool Smashers	23–25	25–18	16–25	25–23	16–14	105–105	P2
21 Feb	16:00	PSA	Army Black Mamba Lady Troopers	1–3	Akari Power Chargers	18–25	19–25	25–23	19–25		81–98	P2
21 Feb	18:00	PSA	PLDT High Speed Hitters	3–0	Chery Tiggo Crossovers	25–13	25–22	27–25			77–60	P2
23 Feb	16:00	FEC	Choco Mucho Flying Titans	3–2	Army Black Mamba Lady Troopers	23–25	25–20	25–16	25–27	15–11	113–99	P2
23 Feb	18:00	FEC	Petro Gazz Angels	2–3	PLDT High Speed Hitters	25–21	29–31	21–25	25–21	13–15	113–113	P2
25 Feb	16:00	PSA	Creamline Cool Smashers	3–1	Chery Tiggo Crossovers	17–25	25–11	25–19	25–21		92–76	P2
25 Feb	18:00	PSA	Cignal HD Spikers	0–3	F2 Logistics Cargo Movers	23–25	20–25	23–25			66–75	P2
28 Feb	16:00	PSA	Creamline Cool Smashers	3–0	Army Black Mamba Lady Troopers	25–15	25–20	25–12			75–47	P2
28 Feb	18:00	PSA	Akari Power Chargers	1–3	PLDT High Speed Hitters	14–25	25–21	12–25	15–25		66–96	P2
02 Mar	16:00	PSA	Choco Mucho Flying Titans	2–3	Cignal HD Spikers	14–25	11–25	25–19	25–17	11–15	86–101	P2
02 Mar	18:00	PSA	Petro Gazz Angels	3–0	F2 Logistics Cargo Movers	25–23	25–13	25–23			75–59	P2
04 Mar	16:00	FEC	Army Black Mamba Lady Troopers	0–3	Petro Gazz Angels	21–25	10–25	13–25			44–75	P2
04 Mar	18:00	FEC	Chery Tiggo Crossovers	2–3	Akari Power Chargers	25–16	22–25	25–19	21–25	11–15	104–100	P2
07 Mar	16:00	PSA	PLDT High Speed Hitters	0–3	Creamline Cool Smashers	20–25	21–25	17–25			58–75	P2
07 Mar	18:00	PSA	F2 Logistics Cargo Movers	3–1	Choco Mucho Flying Titans	25–23	25–19	13–25	25–22		88–89	P2
09 Mar	16:00	PSA	Petro Gazz Angels	3–1	Akari Power Chargers	25–15	25–19	22–25	25–16		97–75	P2
09 Mar	18:00	PSA	Choco Mucho Flying Titans	0–3	Chery Tiggo Crossovers	21–25	19–25	19–25			59–75	P2
11 Mar	16:00	FEC	F2 Logistics Cargo Movers	3–1	Army Black Mamba Lady Troopers	25–15	20–25	25–20	25–13		95–73	P2
11 Mar	18:00	FEC	Cignal HD Spikers	0–3	PLDT High Speed Hitters	23–25	23–25	14–25			60–75	P2
14 Mar	16:00	SAG	Chery Tiggo Crossovers	0–3	Petro Gazz Angels	21–25	26–28	21–25			68–78	P2
14 Mar	18:00	SAG	Akari Power Chargers	1–3	Creamline Cool Smashers	17–25	22–25	29–27	8–25		76–102	P2
16 Mar	16:00	PSA	PLDT High Speed Hitters	3–1	Choco Mucho Flying Titans	21–25	25–23	25–23	25–16		96–87	P2
16 Mar	18:00	PSA	Army Black Mamba Lady Troopers	0–3	Cignal HD Spikers	27–29	19–25	16–25			62–79	P2

== Final round ==
- All times are Philippine Standard Time (UTC+8:00).

Semifinals
March 18–21
1 Creamline	3	3
4 F2 Logistics	1	0
March 18–23
2 Petro Gazz	3	1	3
3 PLDT	1	3	0

Championship
March 26–30
Creamline	1	3	3
Petro Gazz	3	2	1
3rd place match
March 26–28
F2 Logistics	3	3
PLDT	1	1

=== Semifinals ===
Rank 1 vs Rank 4

- Creamline wins series, 2–0

Date	Time	Venue		Score		Set 1	Set 2	Set 3	Set 4	Set 5	Total	Report
18 Mar	16:00	PSA	F2 Logistics Cargo Movers	1–3	Creamline Cool Smashers	24–26	18–25	25–22	15–25		82–98	P2
21 Mar	18:30	MOA	Creamline Cool Smashers	3–0	F2 Logistics Cargo Movers	25–22	25–23	25–16			75–61	P2

Rank 2 vs Rank 3

- Petro Gazz wins series, 2–1

Date	Time	Venue		Score		Set 1	Set 2	Set 3	Set 4	Set 5	Total	Report
18 Mar	18:30	PSA	Petro Gazz Angels	3–1	PLDT High Speed Hitters	22–25	25–19	25–21	25–18		97–83	P2
21 Mar	16:00	MOA	PLDT High Speed Hitters	3–1	Petro Gazz Angels	14–25	25–23	25–14	25–15		89–77	P2
23 Mar	17:00	MOA	Petro Gazz Angels	3–0	PLDT High Speed Hitters	25–17	25–23	25–15			75–55	P2

=== Finals ===
==== 3rd place ====
- F2 wins series, 2–0

Date	Time	Venue		Score		Set 1	Set 2	Set 3	Set 4	Set 5	Total	Report
26 Mar	16:00	MOA	PLDT High Speed Hitters	1–3	F2 Logistics Cargo Movers	25–20	22–25	18–25	17–25		82–95	P2
28 Mar	16:00	MOA	F2 Logistics Cargo Movers	3–1	PLDT High Speed Hitters	23–25	25–23	25–23	25–15		98–86	P2

==== Championship ====
- Creamline wins series, 2–1

Date	Time	Venue		Score		Set 1	Set 2	Set 3	Set 4	Set 5	Total	Report
26 Mar	18:00	MOA	Creamline Cool Smashers	1–3	Petro Gazz Angels	22–25	26–24	23–25	24–26		95–100	P2
28 Mar	18:00	MOA	Petro Gazz Angels	2–3	Creamline Cool Smashers	25–18	16–25	18–25	25–23	6–15	90–106	P2
30 Mar	17:30	MOA	Creamline Cool Smashers	3–1	Petro Gazz Angels	20–25	25–20	25–18	25–15		95–78	P2

== Final standing ==
Rank	Team
1st place, gold medalist(s)	Creamline Cool Smashers
2nd place, silver medalist(s)	Petro Gazz Angels
3rd place, bronze medalist(s)	F2 Logistics Cargo Movers
4	PLDT High Speed Hitters
5	Chery Tiggo Crossovers
6	Cignal HD Spikers
7	Choco Mucho Flying Titans
8	Akari Power Chargers
9	Army Black Mamba Lady Troopers

2023 PVL First All-Filipino champions
Creamline Cool Smashers
Sixth title

Team roster
Alyssa Valdez, Celine Domingo, Risa Sato, Jeanette Panaga, Diana Mae Carlos, Michele Gumabao, Jorella Marie De Jesus, Lorielyn Bernardo, Pau Soriano, Kyla Atienza, Julia Melissa Morado-De Guzman (c), Fille Cainglet-Cayetano, Kyle Negrito, Rizza Jane Mandapat, Rosemarie Vargas, Jessica Margarett Galanza
Head coach
Sherwin Meneses

== Awards and medalists ==
=== Individual awards ===
Award	Player	Team	Ref.
Conference Most Valuable Player	Tots Carlos	Creamline	
Finals Most Valuable Player	Jia De Guzman	Creamline	
1st Best Outside Spiker	Tots Carlos	Creamline	
2nd Best Outside Spiker	Jema Galanza	Creamline	
1st Best Middle Blocker	Remy Palma	Petro Gazz	
2nd Best Middle Blocker	MJ Phillips	Petro Gazz	
Best Opposite Spiker	Michele Gumabao	Creamline	
Best Setter	Jia De Guzman	Creamline	
Best Libero	Kath Arado	PLDT	

=== Medalists ===
Gold	Silver	Bronze
Creamline Cool Smashers Jia De Guzman(c); Alyssa Valdez; Celine Domingo; Risa Sato; Jeanette Panaga; Diana Mae Carlos; Michele Gumabao; Jorella Marie De Jesus (L); Lorielyn Bernardo; Pau Soriano; Kyla Atienza (L); Fille Cainglet-Cayetano; Kyle Negrito; Rizza Jane Mandapat; Rosemarie Vargas; Jessica Margarett Galanza Head Coach: Sherwin Meneses	Petro Gazz Angels Relea Ferina Saet(c); Lourdes Clemente; Djanel Cheng; Mariella Gabarda; Heather Guino-o; Grethcel Soltones; Angeline Marie Gervacio; Jellie Tempiatura (L); Aiza Maizo-Pontillas; Mary Remy Joy Palma; Marian Alisa Buitre; MJ Phillips; Cienne Mary Arielle Cruz (L); Nicole Anne Tiamzon; Jonah Sabete Head Coach: Oliver Almadro	F2 Logistics Cargo Movers Abigail Maraño (c); Ivy Keith Lacsina; Victonara Galang; Dawn Nicole Macandili-Catindig; Maria Shola Alvarez; Myla Pablo; Kim Fajardo; Mary Joy Baron; Charleen Abigaile Cruz-Behag; Carmel June Woo; Kim Kianna Dy; Chiennie Pia Arroyo; Elaine Kasilag; Rovena Andrea Instrella; Jessma Clarice Ramos; Iris Janelle Tolenada Head Coach: Regine Diego

== Statistics leaders ==
Statistics leaders correct at the end of the preliminary round.

Best Scorers
Rank	Name	Points
1	Mylene Paat	148
2	Kim Kianna Dy	127
3	Dindin Santiago-Manabat	118
4	Kat Tolentino	116
5	Royse Tubino	113

Best Spikers
Rank	Name	%Eff
1	Michele Gumabao	40.43
2	Tots Carlos	37.21
3	Jema Galanza	36.40
4	Aiza Maizo-Pontillas	35.96
5	Mylene Paat	33.33

Best Blockers
Rank	Name	Avg
1	Abigail Maraño	0.73
2	Remy Palma	0.70
3	Roselyn Doria	0.69
4	MJ Phillips	0.67
5	Celine Domingo	0.57

Best Servers
Rank	Name	Avg
1	Jia De Guzman	0.46
2	Grethcel Soltones	0.44
3	Tots Carlos	0.36
4	Roselyn Doria	0.35
5	Ennajie Laure	0.29

Best Diggers
Rank	Name	Avg
1	Kath Arado	6.80
2	Dawn Macandili	6.00
3	Ria Duremdes	4.82
4	Bang Pineda	4.77
5	Kyla Atienza	3.79

Best Setters
Rank	Name	Avg
1	Jia De Guzman	7.32
2	Rhea Dimaculangan	5.13
3	Kim Fajardo	4.80
4	Djanel Cheng	4.67
5	Alina Bicar	4.43

Best Receivers
Rank	Name	%Succ
1	Kath Arado	63.86
2	Cienne Cruz	49.44
3	Dawn Macandili	44.89
4	Ria Duremdes	42.28
5	Tots Carlos	38.37

== See also ==
- 2023 Spikers' Turf Open Conference
