= Lorie Bernardo =

Filipino volleyball player

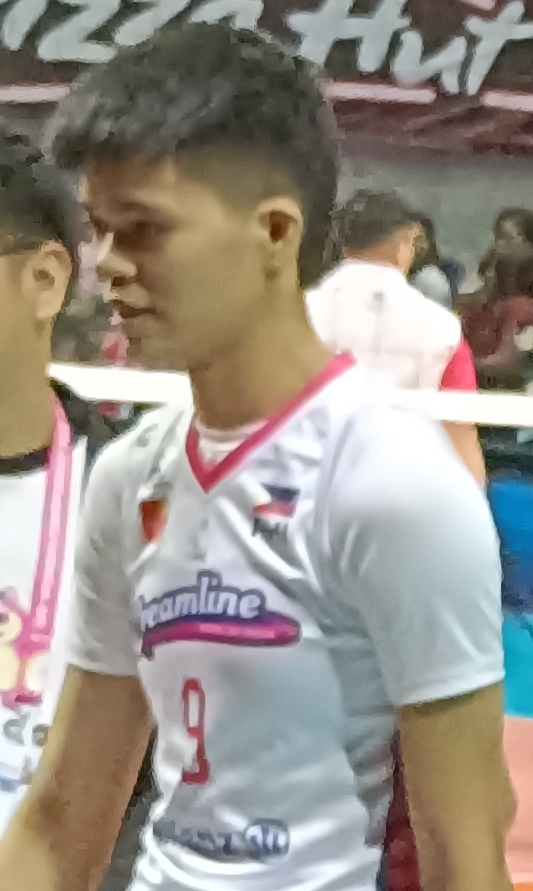
- Bernardo in 2025

Personal information
- Full name: Lorielyn Bernardo
- Nationality: Filipino
- Born: August 1, 2000 (age 26); Quezon City, Philippines
- Height: 1.82 m (6 ft 0 in)
- Education: University of the Philippines

Volleyball information
- Position: Opposite Hitter; Middle Blocker
- Current club: Creamline Cool Smashers
- Number: 9

National team
2022	Philippines

Lorielyn Bernardo (born August 1, 2000) is a Filipino professional volleyball player who is an opposite hitter and middle blocker for the Creamline Cool Smashers of the Premier Volleyball League (PVL). In college, she played for the UP Fighting Maroons women's volleyball program.

== Career ==
She made her first game appearance with the UP Fighting Maroons in UAAP in the UAAP Season 81 where her team placed 5th.

In 2022, the UAAP came back after the league has been cancelled for 2 years because of the COVID-19 pandemic. Her team finished 6th place. After the UAAP Season 84, Bernardo decided to go pro and she was signed by the Creamline Cool Smashers.

== Clubs ==
- (Philippines) Creamline Cool Smashers (2022–present)

== Awards ==
=== Collegiate ===
==== UP Lady Maroons ====
Year	League	Conference	Title	Ref				
Year	League	Conference	Title	Ref	2018	PSL	Grand Slam	Champions

=== Clubs ===
Year	Season/Conference	Clubs	Title	Ref				
Year	Season/Conference	Clubs	Title	Ref	2022	Invitational	Creamline Cool Smashers	Champions
Reinforced	3rd Place				2022		Creamline Cool Smashers	
2023	1st All-Filipino	Champions					Creamline Cool Smashers	
2023	Invitational	Runner-up					Creamline Cool Smashers	
2023	2nd All-Filipino	Champions					Creamline Cool Smashers	
2024	All-Filipino	Champions					Creamline Cool Smashers	
2024	Reinforced	Champions					Creamline Cool Smashers	
2024	Invitational	Champions					Creamline Cool Smashers	
2024–25	All-Filipino	Runner-up					Creamline Cool Smashers	
2025	on Tour	Bronze					Creamline Cool Smashers	
2025	Invitational	Bronze					Creamline Cool Smashers	
2026	All-Filipino	Champions					Creamline Cool Smashers	
