= Mafe Galanza =

Filipina volleyball player (born 2000)

Personal information
- Full name: Maria Fe Casidsid Galanza
- Born: May 11, 2000 (age 26)
- Hometown: San Pedro, Laguna, Philippines
- Height: 1.63 m (5 ft 4 in)
- Education: University of Santo Tomas

Volleyball information
- Position: Setter

Career
Years	Teams
2023–2025	Creamline Cool Smashers

Maria Fe "Mafe" Casidsid Galanza (born May 11, 2000) is a Filipina volleyball player who last played for the Creamline Cool Smashers of the Premier Volleyball League (PVL). She played as setter for the University of Santo Tomas Growling Tigresses in the UAAP. She is the younger sister of Jema Galanza, who was her teammate from 2023 to 2025.

== Personal life ==
Galanza played volleyball at San Pedro Relocation Center National High School in San Pedro, Laguna. She went to the University of Santo Tomas in Manila for her college studies.

== Career ==
The Tigresses began recruiting Galanza when she was still playing for Laguna in Palarong Pambansa. She became a key cog in UST's return to the finals in UAAP Season 81 volleyball despite being a rookie.

In 2023, Galanza turned pro, playing with her sister Jema for the Creamline Cool Smashers in the PVL.

== Awards ==
=== Collegiate ===
- 2018 Philippine Super Liga Collegiate Grand Slam Conference - Silver medal, with UST Golden Tigresses
- 2019 UAAP Season 81 Volleyball Tournaments – 1st runners-up, with UST Tigresses
- 2019 Premier Volleyball League Collegiate Conference - Silver medal, with UST Golden Tigresses

=== Club Team ===
- 2019 PSL Invitational Conference – runner-up, with Petron Blaze Spikers
- 2023 Premier Volleyball League Second All-Filipino Conference – champion, with Creamline Cool Smashers
- 2024 Premier Volleyball League All-Filipino Conference - champion, with Creamline Cool Smashers
- 2024 Premier Volleyball League Reinforced Conference – champion, with Creamline Cool Smashers
- 2024 Premier Volleyball League Invitational Conference – champion, with Creamline Cool Smashers
