= Cienne Cruz =

Filipino volleyball player

Personal information
- Full name: Cienne Mary Arielle Ramos Cruz
- Nationality: Filipino
- Born: October 18, 1994 (age 32)
- Education: De La Salle University
- Height: 5 ft 5 in (1.65 m)

Volleyball information
- Position: Libero
- Number: 18

Career
- Years: Team
- 2016: F2 Logistics Cargo Movers
- 2018–2023: Petro Gazz Angels

Cienne Mary Arielle Ramos Cruz-Guenther (born October 18, 1994) is a Filipino volleyball player. She was a member of the De La Salle Lady Spikers collegiate women's volleyball team.

Cruz attended Hope Christian High School before going on to play for De La Salle University. She last played for the Petro Gazz Angels in the Premier Volleyball League.

== Personal life ==
She has a twin sister named Camille who became her teammate on the Lady Spikers. Her older sister Charleen served as captain of the Lady Spikers from 2010 to 2012.

She married her fiancé, Peter Guenther in October 2023.

== Clubs ==
- (Philippines) F2 Logistics Cargo Movers (2016)
- (Philippines) Petro Gazz Angels (2018–2023)

== Awards ==
=== Individuals ===
Year	League	Conference	Award	Ref
2018	PVL	Open	Best Libero	

=== Clubs ===
Year	League	Season/Conference	Title	Award	Ref
2019	PVL	Reinforced	Petro Gazz Angels	Champions	
2019	PVL	Open	Petro Gazz Angels	Runner-up	
2021	PVL	Open	Petro Gazz Angels	3rd Place	
2022	PVL	Open	Petro Gazz Angels	Runner-up	
2022	PVL	Reinforced	Petro Gazz Angels	Champions	
2023	PVL	1st All-Filipino	Petro Gazz Angels	Runner-up	
