= Ivy Lacsina =

Filipina volleyball player

Personal information
- Full name: Ivy Keith Lacsina
- Nationality: Filipino
- Born: October 21, 1999 (age 27)
- Home town: San Fernando, Pampanga
- Education: National University
- Height: 6 ft 1 in (1.85 m)

Volleyball information
- Position: Outside/Open Hitter; Middle Blocker
- Current team: Akari Chargers
- Number: 16

Career
- Years: Team
- 2018: BaliPure Purest Water Defenders
- 2022–2023: F2 Logistics Cargo Movers
- 2023–2024: Nxled Chameleons
- 2024–present: Akari Chargers

Ivy Keith Lacsina (born October 21, 1999) is a Filipino volleyball player. She played for the NU Lady Bulldogs in the UAAP. She is currently playing for the Akari Chargers in the Premier Volleyball League.

== Career ==
=== UAAP ===
Lacsina played for NU Lady Bulldogs in the University Athletic Association of the Philippines.

In 2021, Lacsina joined Rebisco Philippines in the 2021 Asian Women's Club Volleyball Championship.

In 2022, Lacsina and her team NU Lady Bulldogs won in the UAAP Season 84 volleyball tournaments against De La Salle University in the UAAP Finals.

=== PVL ===
In 2018, she played for BaliPure Purest Water Defenders as a Middle Blocker in the Premier Volleyball League (PVL).

In September 2022, Lacsina joined the F2 Logistics Cargo Movers. Following the team's disbandment, she joined the Nxled Chameleons in 2023 but was traded to its sister team, the Akari Chargers, in 2024.

== Personal life ==
Lacsina is currently in a relationship with former Ateneo Lady Eagles and Choco Mucho Flying Titans player Deanna Wong.

== Clubs ==
=== Collegiate ===
- (Philippines) NU Lady Bulldogs (2019–2022)

=== Clubs ===
- (Philippines) BaliPure Purest Water Defenders (2018)
- (Philippines) F2 Logistics Cargo Movers (2022–2023)
- (Philippines) Nxled Chameleons (2024)
- (Philippines) Akari Chargers (2024–present)

== Awards ==
=== Collegiate ===
==== NU Lady Bulldogs ====
Year	Season	Title	Ref			
Year	Season	Title	Ref	2022	84	Champions

=== Clubs ===
Year	Conference	Club	Title	Ref				
Year	Conference	Club	Title	Ref	2023	1st All-Filipino	F2 Logistics	3rd Place
2024	Reinforced	Akari Chargers	Runners-up					
2024-25	All-Filipino	Akari Chargers	3rd Place					
2025	Reinforced	Akari Chargers	3rd Place					
