= Quezon City Gerflor Defenders =

Women's volleyball team in the Philippines

- Short name: Quezon City Gerflor
- Nickname: Defenders
- Dissolved: 2023
- Owner: Quezon City Sports Management Services
- League: Premier Volleyball League (2023)

The Quezon City Gerflor Defenders were a women's volleyball team in the Philippines which played in the Premier Volleyball League.

== History ==
The Quezon City Gerflor Defenders, a private professional club supported by the Quezon City Sports Management Services joined the Premier Volleyball League debuting in the 2023 Invitational Conference. They have committed to take part in the PVL for at least three years. Prior to this, they have played in various other leagues and tournaments including the PNVF Champions League. The team had Edgar Barroga as its inaugural head coach.

On November 9, 2023, during the 2023 Second All-Filipino Conference, the Defenders were put under investigation by the league after some of its players posted on Reddit in regards to various internal problems including wage issues. The team was effectively disbanded after the tournament.

In January 2023, it was announced that the Strong Group Athletics would be taking over Gerflor's franchise. The group reportedly helped resolved the salary issue. It will be Strong Group's second PVL team, the first being the Farm Fresh Foxies.

== Final roster ==
Quezon City Gerflor Defenders
Number	Player	Position	Height	Birth date	School
1	(Philippines) Vhima Condada	Libero			UPSHD
2	(Philippines) Satriani Espiritu	Middle Blocker	1.79 m (5 ft 10 in)		SBU
3	(Philippines) Kimberly Grace Manzano	Middle Blocker			SBU
4	(Philippines) Jhona Rosal	Outside Hitter			UPSHD
5	(Philippines) Mary Angelei Jingco	Outside Hitter			DLSU
6	(Philippines) Sarah Jane Gonzales	Setter	1.63 m (5 ft 4 in)	May 8, 1991 (age 34)	UST
7	(Philippines) Menchie Tubiera	Outside Hitter	1.70 m (5 ft 7 in)	November 1, 1993 (age 32)	AU
8	(Philippines) Danika Gendrauli	Opposite Hitter	1.69 m (5 ft 7 in)	June 3, 1991 (age 34)	SWU
12	(Philippines) Shyra Mae Umandal	Middle Blocker	1.70 m (5 ft 7 in)	January 17, 1998 (age 28)	UPSHD
13	(Philippines) Lhara Maye Clavano	Setter	1.77 m (5 ft 10 in)	May 13, 1999 (age 26)	UE
14	(Philippines) Katrina Racelis	Outside Hitter	1.70 m (5 ft 7 in)	July 5, 1995 (age 30)	MU
17	(Philippines) Jenny Gaviola	Middle Blocker			UPSHD
19	(Philippines) Pia Sarmiento (C)	Libero			LPU
20	(Philippines) Mary Grace Berte	Outside Hitter	1.78 m (5 ft 10 in)	August 8, 1994 (age 31)	HCDC
21	(Philippines) Jeanette Virginia Villareal	Opposite Hitter		July 21, 1998 (age 27)	FEU
25	(Philippines) Bien Elaine Juanillo	Opposite Hitter	1.80 m (5 ft 11 in)		LPU

Coaching staff
Position	Name
Head Coach	(Philippines) Sammy Acaylar
Assistant Coach 1	(Philippines) Michael Cariño Jr.
Assistant Coach 2	(Philippines) Marcelo Joaquin
Strength and Conditioning Coach	(Philippines) Monique Aglipay
Trainer	(Philippines)
Trainer	(Philippines)
Team Manager	(Philippines) Jordan Tolentino
Physical Therapist	(Philippines) Kristine May Plopenio

== Honors ==
Season	Conference	Title	Source
2023	Invitational	12th place	
2023	Second All-Filipino	12th place	

== Team captains ==
- (Philippines) Justine Dorog (2023 Invitational)
- (Philippines) Pia Sarmiento (2023 Second All-Filipino)

== Head coaches ==
- (Philippines) Edgar Barroga (2023 Invitational)
- (Philippines) Sammy Acaylar (2023 Second All-Filipino)
