= May Luna =

Filipino volleyball athlete (born 1998)

Personal information
- Full name: May Luna
- Nickname: Mayang
- Nationality: Filipino
- Born: May 3, 1998 (age 28)
- Home town: Davao del Norte, Philippines
- Education: De La Salle University
- Height: 175 cm (5 ft 9 in)
- Weight: 54.55 kg (120.3 lb)

Volleyball information
- Position: Outside hitter

May Luna (born May 3, 1998) is a Filipino former professional volleyball athlete. She played with the De La Salle University collegiate women's varsity volleyball in the Season 78 of the University Athletic Association of the Philippines. She has also played in the Philippine Volleyball Federation National Inter-Collegiate Volleyball Tournament (InterCol), Philippine National Games, Philippine University Games, Palarong Pambansa and Shakey's G-League.

== Personal life ==
May Luna, also known as "Mayang", was born in Tagum City, Philippines. She is the youngest of 7 siblings. Even before moving to Manila, Luna has already earned an amount of popularity back in her hometown Davao. She studies a Bachelor of Arts in Sports Studies (AB-SPM) at De La Salle University.

== Career ==
Luna was considered "one of the most hotly recruited volleyball athletes in the country in 2015." In order to get the commitment of this young Davaoeña, it took a coach such that of DLSU's Ramil de Jesus to personally travel to Davao to recruit this athlete. Since then, she was tagged as the ‘heir apparent’ to MVP and former Team Captain Ara Galang, who was on her final year in UAAP.

She won the 2nd Best Outside Spiker of the Shakey's G-League in 2015. In her rookie year, Luna was selected to play for La Salle in the UAAP Season 78.

== Clubs ==
- (Philippines) F2 Logistics Cargo Movers (2018)
- (Philippines) Cignal HD Spikers (2019–2021)
- (Philippines) Chery Tiggo Crossovers (2022–2023)
- (Philippines) Foton Tornadoes (2023)
- (Philippines) Nxled Chameleons (2023–2025)

== Awards ==
=== Individual ===
Season	Tournament	Award	Ref
2015	Shakey's G-League	2nd Best Outside Hitter	

=== Collegiate ===
Season	Tournament	Title	Ref
2015–2016	UAAP Season 78	Champions	
2016–2017	UAAP Season 79	Champions	
2017–2018	UAAP Season 80	Champions	
2018–2019	UAAP Season 81	3rd place	

=== Clubs ===
Season	Tournament	Club	Title	Ref
2018	2018 PSL All-Filipino Conference	F2 Logistics	Runner-up	
