= Geneveve Casugod =

Filipino volleyball player (born 1994)

Gen Casugod

Personal information
- Full name: Geneveve Casugod
- Born: January 12, 1991 (age 35)
- Hometown: Negros Occidental
- Height: 6 ft 1 in (1.85 m)
- Weight: 72 kg (159 lb)
- Spike: 271 cm (107 in)
- Block: 268 cm (106 in)
- Education: Far Eastern University

Volleyball information
- Position: Middle Blocker
- Current club: Cignal HD Spikers
- Number: 4

National team
2017	Philippines

Geneveve Casugod (born January 12, 1991) is a Filipino professional volleyball player who currently plays for the Cignal HD Spikers on the Premier Volleyball League. She was a former member of the collegiate varsity volleyball team of the Far Eastern University in its indoor games. She is a former member of the Philippines women's national volleyball team.

== Career ==
Casugod debuted in the 76th Season of UAAP Women's Volleyball with the FEU Tamaraws. She has been a part of the team for 2 years after she decided to leave due to her pregnancy. Casugod has been a big part of the FEU team after helping the team reach the Final Four on the 77th Season of UAAP. During the 11th Season of Shakey's V League on its first conference, Geneveve received her first medal, winning the title of the conference and the trophy along with the Lady Tammaraws. After her hiatus on playing volleyball, she signed a contract with the Generika-Ayala Lifesavers and debut on the 2017 PSL All-Filipino Conference as their team captain until the 2017 PSL Invitational Cup. She continued playing for the club until the 2017 PSL Grand Prix Conference after leaving the team and continuing her career for the Foton Tornadoes on the 2018 PSL All-Filipino Conference.

== Clubs ==
- (Philippines) Generika-Ayala Lifesavers (2016–2017)
- (Philippines) Foton Tornadoes (2018–2020)

2016–2017

- (Philippines) Marinerang Pilipina (2020–2021)
- (Philippines) BaliPure Purest Water Defenders (2021–2022)
- (Philippines) Akari Power Chargers (2022–2023)
- (Philippines) Cignal HD Spikers (2023-present)

== Awards ==
=== Clubs ===
Year	Tournament	Club	Title	Ref
2023 PVL	Invitational	Cignal HD Spikers	3rd Place	
2023 PVL	2nd All-Filipino	Cignal HD Spikers	3rd Place	
2024 PNVF	Champions League	Cignal HD Spikers	Runner-up	
