= Tots Carlos =

Filipino volleyball player (born 1998)

Personal information
- Full name: Diana Mae M. Carlos
- Nicknames: Tots, Caloy
- Nationality: Filipino
- Born: July 7, 1998 (age 28) Guagua, Pampanga, Philippines
- Home town: Lubao, Pampanga
- Education: University of the Philippines-Diliman (2015–2020)
- Height: 170 cm (5 ft 7 in)
- Weight: 64 kg (141 lb)
- Spike: 288 cm (113 in)
- Block: 280 cm (110 in)

Volleyball information
- Position: Opposite hitter
- Current club: Creamline Cool Smashers
- Number: 18

Career
- Years: Team
- 2017: Perlas Spikers
- 2018: Foton Tornadoes
- 2019–2020: Motolite Power Builders
- 2021-present: Creamline Cool Smashers

National team
- Years: Team
- 2022–present: Philippines

Diana Mae "Tots" Carlos (born July 7, 1998) is a Filipino professional volleyball player who is an opposite hitter for the Creamline Cool Smashers of the Premier Volleyball League (PVL). She was playing with UP Lady Fighting Maroons of the University of the Philippines-Diliman, and a member of both the indoor and beach volleyball collegiate varsity teams of the university. She bagged the back-to-back Most Valuable Player and Best Opposite Spiker in the 2022 Premier Volleyball League Open Conference and 2022 Premier Volleyball League Invitational Conference. She is also part of the Philippines women's national volleyball team that competed in the 2022 Asian Women's Volleyball Cup.

== Personal life ==
Carlos originates from Lubao, Pampanga. She identifies as a member of the LGBT community and was formerly in a relationship with then-FEU Lady Tamaraws and Akari player Celine Domingo.

== Career ==
Carlos began her collegiate volleyball career in the UAAP Season 78. Aside from UP she was also being recruited by other UAAP teams of DLSU, Adamson and FEU. She won the Palarong Pambansa Best Blocker award before entering college at the University of the Philippines-Diliman, she is currently playing for the UP Fighting Lady Maroons. She helped her collegiate team enter the Final Four in the UAAP Season 78, and helped the team win two bronze medal finishes in the Shakey's V-League. Carlos is known for her versatility, she was a Middle blocker in High School before she was converted to an Opposite Hitter, and later on to an Outside hitter for the Lady Maroons. Carlos won the Inquirer 7 - Week 2 Top 7 and Week 3 Top 1 Player from the UAAP.

At the age of 18, she was recruited to play for the Perlas Spikers in the Premier Volleyball League 1st Season Reinforced Open Conference. For two consecutive years, she was picked to join the Premier Volleyball League All-Star. In 2016, she helped Team Palaban defeat Team Puso. In 2017, she top-scored Team Roger to defeat Team Rico where she bagged the 2017 PVL Best Player of the All-Stars award. She is also a member of the UP Fighting Maroons Women's Beach Volleyball Team, where she and Ayel Estrañero won bronze for the Lady Maroons.

In 2018, Carlos was awarded as the 1st Best Outside Spiker and the Most Valuable Player in the 2018 PSL Collegiate Grand Slam Conference after her return from shin injury.

In 2019, Carlos led the Motolite team in its inaugural semis run for the 2019 PVL Open Conference as the league's 2nd highest scorer. She was eventually elected as the Best Opposite of the tournament. In 2021, she joined the Creamline Cool Smashers for the first season of the Premier Volleyball League on its professional status.

== Clubs ==
- (Philippines) Perlas Lady Spikers (2017)
- (Philippines) Foton Tornadoes (2018)
- (Philippines) Motolite Power Builders (2019–2020)
- (Philippines) Creamline Cool Smashers (2021-present)

== Awards ==
=== Individuals ===
- 2015 Palarong Pambansa "Best blocker"
- 2018 PSL Collegiate Grand Slam Conference "1st Best Outside Spiker"
- 2018 PSL Collegiate Grand Slam Conference "Most valuable player"
- 2019 PVL Open Conference "Best opposite spiker"
- 2022 PVL Open Conference "Best opposite spiker"
- 2022 PVL Open Conference "Conference Most Valuable Player"
- 2022 PVL Invitational Conference "Best opposite spiker"
- 2022 PVL Invitational Conference "Conference Most Valuable Player"
- 2023 PVL All-Filipino Conference "Conference Most Valuable Player"
- 2023 PVL All-Filipino Conference "1st Best Outside Spiker"
- 2023 PVL Invitational Conference "Best Opposite Spiker"
- 2023 PVL Second All-Filipino Conference "Finals Most Valuable Player"

=== Collegiate ===
- 2015 Shakey's V-League 12th Season Reinforced Open Conference – Bronze medal, with UP Fighting Lady Maroons
- 2016 Shakey's V-League 13th Season Collegiate Conference – Bronze medal, with UP Fighting Lady Maroons
- 2016 Founders' Cup Philippines – Champion, with UP Fighting Lady Maroons
- 2017 Founders' Cup Philippines – Champion, with UP Fighting Lady Maroons
- 2017 UAAP Season 80 Beach Volleyball – Bronze medal, with UP Fighting Lady Maroons
- 2018 PSL Collegiate Grand Slam Conference – Champion, with UP Fighting Lady Maroons

=== Club ===
- 2018 Philippine Superliga Grand Prix – Bronze medal, with Foton Tornadoes
- 2021 Premier Volleyball League Open Conference – Runner-up with Creamline Cool Smashers
- 2022 Premier Volleyball League Open Conference – Champion, with Creamline Cool Smashers
- 2022 Premier Volleyball League Invitational Conference – Champion, with Creamline Cool Smashers
- 2022 Premier Volleyball League Reinforced Conference – Bronze medal, with Creamline Cool Smashers
- 2023 Premier Volleyball League All-Filipino Conference – Champion, with Creamline Cool Smashers
- 2023 Premier Volleyball League Invitational Conference – Runner-up with Creamline Cool Smashers
- 2023 Premier Volleyball League Second All-Filipino Conference – Champion, with Creamline Cool Smashers
- 2024 Premier Volleyball League All-Filipino Conference – Champions, with Creamline Cool Smashers
- 2024 Premier Volleyball League Reinforced Conference – Champions, with Creamline Cool Smashers
