= Regine Diego =

Filipino volleyball coach and player

Personal information
- Nationality: Filipino
- Education: De La Salle University (2006–2009)

Coaching information
- Current team: NU Lady Bulldogs
Previous teams coached
Years	Teams
2016–2017; 2019; 2019; 2020; 2020; 2023; 2025–2026	Calabarzon (girls); NU–Nazareth School (girls); National Capital Region (girls); Philippines U17 (girls); Philippines U19 (girls); F2 Logistics Cargo Movers; NU Lady Bulldogs

Regine Diego is a Filipino volleyball coach and former collegiate player. She is the former head coach of the F2 Logistics Cargo Movers of the Premier Volleyball League.

== Playing career ==
Diego was a former player for De La Salle University (DLSU) which played in the University Athletic Association of the Philippines (UAAP). She played under the team coached by Ramil de Jesus as a libero. She helped the team win four UAAP volleyball championships. She played for DLSU from 2006 to 2009.

== Coaching career ==
After graduating from DLSU, she joined the coaching staff of National University (NU). She was an assistant coach to both the girls' and women's volleyball teams. In 2019 at Season 82, Diego led the Bullpups, the NU–Nazareth School girls' team, to the junior championship as their head coach.

Diego has also coached the Calabarzon girls' team in the Palarong Pambansa. She helped the team, represented by De La Salle Lipa's high school team, win the 2017 girls' volleyball title. In the 2019 edition, as coach of the NU–Nazareth School, helped National Capital Region (NCR) secured the title against Western Visayas.

She resigned as coach of NU–Nazareth School in 2020. She was named as coach of the under-17 and under-19 Philippine girls' national team under the Larong Volleyball sa Pilipinas in 2020.

Diego is the first ever female head coach of a Premier Volleyball League (PVL) team. In January 2023, Diego was appointed as full-time head coach of the F2 Logistics Cargo Movers replacing interim coach Benson Bocboc who mentored the team in lieu of Ramil de Jesus. She led F2 in the 2023 All-Filipino Conference, where it finished with a bronze medal, its strongest showing in the PVL. Diego was the Cargo Movers' last coach before it was disbanded in December 2023.

In September 2025, Diego was appointed as full-time head coach of the NU Lady Bulldogs replacing Sherwin Meneses.
