= Michelle Cobb =

Filipino volleyball player

Personal information
- Nationality: Filipino
- Born: Michelle Monique Cobb; February 16, 1999 (age 27) Manila, Philippines
- Education: De La Salle University (2017–2020)
- Height: 161 cm (5 ft 3 in)

Volleyball information
- Position: Setter

Career
- Years: Team
- 2018–2019: F2 Logistics Cargo Movers
- 2022–2025: Akari Chargers

Michelle Monique Cobb-Generoso (born February 16, 1999) is a Filipino former professional volleyball player.

== Early life and education ==
Michelle Monique Cobb was born on February 16, 1999 in Manila, Philippines. She studied at St. Scholastica's College, Manila and the De La Salle University.

== Career ==
=== Collegiate ===
Cobb played for the De La Salle Lady Spikers at the University Athletic Association of the Philippines (UAAP). In 2017, she helped the De La Salle clinch their second and third titles of their three-peat in Seasons 79 and 80. She became a starter at Season 81, however her team failed to reach the Final Four. She played a game in Season 82 which was eventually cancelled due to the COVID-19 pandemic in 2020. Women's volleyball was not held for the next two years. In April 2022, Cobb decided to forego her final year of eligibility.

=== Club ===
Cobb was part of the F2 Logistics Cargo Movers when it was still playing in the Philippine Super Liga. She was part of the team from 2018 to 2019.

Cobb made her professional debut with the Akari Chargers of the Premier Volleyball League. The club announced her signing in July 2022. She debuted at the 2022 Reinforced Conference in October. In June 2025, she announced her retirement from professional volleyball after the team announced her appointment as the Chargers's assistant team manager.

== Personal life ==
As of November 2025, Cobb has been married to Quezon City 6th district councilor Vito Sotto Generoso, the grandson of Senator Tito Sotto and actress Helen Gamboa.
