= F2 Logistics Cargo Movers =

Filipino women's volleyball club

- Full name: F2 Logistics Cargo Movers
- Short name: F2 Logistics
- Nickname: Cargo Movers
- Founded: 2016
- Dissolved: 2023
- Owner: F2 Logistics Philippines Inc.
- League: Philippine Super Liga (2016–2021); Premier Volleyball League (2022–2023)
- Championships: Philippine Super Liga: 5 (2016 All-Filipino, 2017 Grand Prix, 2018 Invitational, 2019 Invitational, 2019 All-Filipino); PNVF Champions League: 1 (2021)

The F2 Logistics Cargo Movers were a professional women's volleyball club in the Philippines owned by F2 Logistics. The team was first established in 2016 and initially competed in the Philippine Super Liga (PSL). The Cargo Movers were one of the most successful teams in the PSL, with five championships and 11 podium finishes.

In 2021, F2 made the jump to the professional Premier Volleyball League (PVL), but wouldn't start competing until 2022. The team was disbanded after the 2023 season, with its successor being the Capital1 Solar Spikers.

== History ==
=== Philippine Superliga (2016–2021) ===
The F2 Logistics Cargo Movers was formed by F2 Logistics Philippines Inc. It debuted in the Philippine Superliga (PSL) in 2016. F2 Logistics won five conference titles in the PSL.

F2 Logistics was also a consistent participant of the Beach Volleyball Challenge Cup, the league's beach volleyball tournament.

=== Premier Volleyball League (2022–2023) ===
==== Move to the PVL and hiatus ====
On March 11, 2021, the team announced it has joined the professional Premier Volleyball League (PVL), following the exodus of other PSL teams to the PVL. On July 9, 2021, the team announced that it will not participate in the Open Conference citing injuries and lack of training due to difficulties maintaining their training bubble.

The indoor volleyball team would not have any competitive games starting March 2020.

==== Playing years and disbandment ====
In November 2021, the Cargo Movers returned to competitive volleyball when they took part and win the inaugural 2021 PNVF Champions League.

F2 Logistics would make their PVL debut at the 2022 Open Conference and went on to play in four more conferences in two seasons, including a bronze in the 2023 First All-Filipino Conference.

On December 13, 2023, the team's disbandment was announced. The associated franchise was not sold rendering its players as free agents.

== Final roster ==
F2 Logistics Cargo Movers
No.	Name	Position	Height	Weight	Spike	Block	Date of birth	School
1	(Philippines) Marionne Angelique Alba	S	1.68 m (5 ft 6 in)					De La Salle University
2	(Philippines) Abigail Maraño (C)	MB	1.75 m (5 ft 9 in)	54 kg (119 lb)	282 cm (111 in)	262 cm (103 in)	December 22, 1992 (age 33)	De La Salle University
3	(Philippines) Ivy Keith Lacsina	MB/OH	1.85 m (6 ft 1 in)				October 21, 1999 (age 26)	National University
4	(Philippines) Victonara Galang	OH	1.73 m (5 ft 8 in)	59 kg (130 lb)	271 cm (107 in)	266 cm (105 in)	January 4, 1995 (age 31)	De La Salle University
5	(Philippines) Dawn Macandili-Catindig	L	1.53 m (5 ft 0 in)	51 kg (112 lb)	248 cm (98 in)	236 cm (93 in)	June 1, 1996 (age 30)	De La Salle University
6	(Philippines) Myla Pablo	OH	1.78 m (5 ft 10 in)				September 12, 1993 (age 33)	National University
7	(Philippines) Maria Shola May Luna Alvarez	OH	1.70 m (5 ft 7 in)				July 11, 1997 (age 29)	José Rizal University
8	(Philippines) Jolina Dela Cruz	OH	1.75 m (5 ft 9 in)				September 5, 1999 (age 27)	De La Salle University
9	(Philippines) Kim Fajardo	S	1.73 m (5 ft 8 in)	59 kg (130 lb)	272 cm (107 in)	257 cm (101 in)	September 30, 1993 (age 32)	De La Salle University
10	(Philippines) Mary Joy Baron	MB	1.80 m (5 ft 11 in)	61 kg (134 lb)	300 cm (120 in)	290 cm (110 in)	December 10, 1994 (age 31)	De La Salle University
11	(Philippines) Charleen Abigaile Cruz-Behag	OH	1.73 m (5 ft 8 in)				May 11, 1988 (age 38)	De La Salle University
12	(Philippines) Carmel June Saga-Woo	L	1.64 m (5 ft 5 in)	52 kg (115 lb)	250 cm (98 in)	238 cm (94 in)		De La Salle University
13	(Philippines) Kim Kianna Dy	OP	1.78 m (5 ft 10 in)	61 kg (134 lb)	290 cm (110 in)	260 cm (100 in)	July 26, 1995 (age 31)	De La Salle University
14	(Philippines) Chinnie Pia Arroyo	OP						National University
15	(Philippines) Elaine Kasilag	OH	1.80 m (5 ft 11 in)		290 cm (110 in)	295 cm (116 in)	August 15, 1994 (age 32)	De La Salle University – Dasmariñas
18	Rovena Andrea Instrella	OP	1.72 m (5 ft 8 in)				November 30, 1998 (age 27)	De La Salle University
19	(Philippines) Jessma Clarice Ramos	MB	1.72 m (5 ft 8 in)	59 kg (130 lb)	273 cm (107 in)	271 cm (107 in)	March 27, 1998 (age 28)	University of the Philippines
22	(Philippines) Jovelyn Fernandez	OP						Far Eastern University
23	(Philippines) (United States) Iris Janelle Tolenada	S	1.74 m (5 ft 9 in)				August 21, 1991 (age 35)	San Francisco State University

Coaching staff
Position	Name
Head Coach	(Philippines) Regine Diego
Assistant Coach 1	(Philippines) Benson Bocboc
Assistant Coach 2	(Philippines)
Assistant Coach 3	(Philippines)
Team Manager	(Philippines) Hollie Reyes
Physical Therapist	(Philippines) Norman Montalvo

- C: Team Captain
- I: Import
- DP: Draft Pick
- R: Rookie
- IN: Inactive
- S: Suspended
- W: Withdrew
- Injured

== Honors ==
=== Indoor volleyball ===
==== Philippine Super Liga ====
Season	Conference	Placement	Reference
2016	Invitational	3rd place	
2016	All-Filipino	Champions	
2016	Grand Prix	3rd Place	
2017	All-Filipino	Runners-up	
2017	Invitational	did not compete	
2017	Grand Prix	Champions	
2018	Grand Prix	Runners-up	
2018	Invitational	Champions	
2018	All-Filipino	Runners-up	
2019	Grand Prix	Runners-up	
2019	All-Filipino	Champions	
2019	Invitational	Champions	

==== PNVF Champions League ====
Season	Placement	Reference
2021	Champions	

==== Premier Volleyball League ====
Season	Conference	Placement	Reference
2021	Open	did not compete	
2022	Open	6th place	
2022	Invitational	did not compete	
2022	Reinforced	5th place	
2023	First All-Filipino	3rd place	
2023	Invitational	4th place	
2023	Second All-Filipino	8th place	

==== Individual ====
Season	Conference	Award	Name
2016	Invitational	1st Best Middle Blocker	(Philippines) Abigail Maraño
2016	All-Filipino	Most Valuable Player	(Philippines) Dawn Macandili
2016	All-Filipino	1st Best Outside Spiker	(Philippines) Victonara Galang
2016	All-Filipino	1st Best Middle Blocker	(Philippines) Abigail Maraño
2016	All-Filipino	Best Setter	(Philippines) Kim Fajardo
2016	All-Filipino	Best Libero	(Philippines) Dawn Macandili
2016	Grand Prix	1st Best Middle Blocker	(Philippines) Abigail Maraño
2016	Grand Prix	Best Setter	(Philippines) Kim Fajardo
2016	Grand Prix	Best Libero	(Philippines) Dawn Macandili
2017	All Filipino	2nd Best Outside Spiker	(Philippines) Victonara Galang
2017	All Filipino	1st Best Middle Blocker	(Philippines) Mary Joy Baron
2017	Grand Prix	Most Valuable Player	(Venezuela) María José Pérez
2017	Grand Prix	2nd Best Middle Blocker	(Philippines) Mary Joy Baron
2017	Grand Prix	2nd Best Opposite Spiker	(Philippines) Kim Kianna Dy
2017	Grand Prix	Best Setter	(Philippines) Kim Fajardo
2017	Grand Prix	1st Best Libero	(Philippines) Dawn Macandili
2018	Grand Prix	2nd Best Outside Spiker	(Venezuela) María José Pérez
2018	Grand Prix	1st Best Middle Blocker	(Philippines) Abigail Maraño
2018	Grand Prix	2nd Best Opposite Spiker	(United States) Kennedy Lynne Bryan
2018	Grand Prix	Best Setter	(Philippines) Kim Fajardo
2018	Grand Prix	1st Best Libero	(Japan) Minami Yoshioka
2018	Invitational	Most Valuable Player	(Philippines) Victonara Galang
2018	Invitational	2nd Best Middle Blocker	(Philippines) Mary Joy Baron
2018	Invitational	Best Setter	(Philippines) Kim Fajardo
2018	Invitational	Best Libero	(Philippines) Dawn Macandili
2018	All-Filipino	2nd Best Middle Blocker	(Philippines) Mary Joy Baron
2018	All-Filipino	Best Setter	(Philippines) Kim Fajardo
2019	Grand Prix	Best Local Outside Spiker	(Philippines) Victonara Galang
2019	Grand Prix	Best Local Middle Blocker	(Philippines) Abigail Maraño
2019	Grand Prix	Best Libero	(Philippines) Dawn Macandili
2019	All Filipino	Most Valuable Player	(Philippines) Tyler-Marie Kalei Mau
2019	All Filipino	2nd Best Middle Blocker	(Philippines) Mary Joy Baron
2019	All Filipino	Best Scorer	(Philippines) Tyler-Marie Kalei Mau
2019	Invitational	Most Valuable Player	(Philippines) Mary Joy Baron
2019	Invitational	1st Best Middle Blocker	(Philippines) Mary Joy Baron
2021	PNVF Champions League for Women	Most Valuable Player	(Philippines) Kim Kianna Dy
2021	PNVF Champions League for Women	Best Setter	(Philippines) Iris Tolenada
2021	PNVF Champions League for Women	1st Best Middle Blocker	(Philippines) Abigail Maraño
2021	PNVF Champions League for Women	Best Opposite Spiker	(Philippines) Kim Kianna Dy
2021	PNVF Champions League for Women	Best Libero	(Philippines) Dawn Macandili
2022	Open	Best Libero	(Philippines) Dawn Macandili
2023	Invitational	1st Best Middle Blocker	(Philippines) Mary Joy Baron

=== Beach volleyball ===
PSL Beach Volleyball Challenge Cup

Season	Placement	Reference
2016	5th Place	
2017	Team A (12th Place)	
2017	Team B (10th Place)	
2018	4th Place	
2019	7th Place	
2020	Not held	
2021	5th Place	

== Imports ==
Season	Number	Player	Country
2016	4	Sydney Jae Kemper	United States
2016	20	Hayley Dora Spelman	United States
2017	3	Kennedy Bryan	United States
2017	16	María José Pérez	Venezuela
2018	3	Kennedy Lynne Bryan	United States
2018	16	María José Pérez	Venezuela
2018	15	Minami Yoshioka	Japan
2019	1	Lindsay Stalzer	United States
2019	0	Rebecca Perry (withdrew)	Italy
2019	20	María José Pérez	Venezuela
2020	8	Lindsay Stalzer	United States
2022	7	Lindsay Stalzer	United States

== Team captains ==
- (Philippines) Charleen Cruz-Behag (2016–2019)
- (Philippines) Abigail Maraño (2019, 2021, 2022, 2023)
- (United States) Lindsay Stalzer (2020, 2022)

== Notable players ==
Criteria

To appear in this section a player must have either:

- Played at least one season for the club.
- Set a club record or won an individual award while at the club.
- Played at least one official international match for their national team at any time.
- To perform very successfully during period in the club or at later/previous stages of his career.

Domestic players

Philippines

- Mary Joy Baron
- Desiree Wynea Cheng
- Djanel Cheng
- Charlene Cruz
- Cydthealee Demecillo
- Kim Kianna Dy
- Kim Fajardo
- Victonara Galang
- Ivy Lacsina
- Dawn Macandili
- Abigail Maraño
- Kalei Mau
- Myla Pablo
- Mika Reyes
- Ernestine Tiamzon
- Iris Tolenada

International players

Italy

- Rebecca Perry

Japan

- Minami Yoshioka

United States

- Lindsay Stalzer
- Kennedy Bryan
- Sydney Jae Kemper
- Hayley Dora Spelman

Venezuela

- María José Pérez

== Coaches ==
- Rose Molit-Prochina (2016)
- Ramil de Jesus (2016–2021)
- Benson Bocboc (2022)
- Regine Diego (2023)
