= F2 Logistics =

Philippine logistics company

F2 Logistics Philippines, Inc.
- Company type: Private
- Industry: Logistics
- Founded: 2006; 19 years ago
- Founder: Efren E. Uy
- Headquarters: Parañaque, Philippines
- Area served: Worldwide
- Key people: Efren E. Uy, Chairman, President and CEO
- Services: Warehousing; Air Freight; Sea Freight; Land Transport; Freight Forwarding; Nationwide Trucking; Contract Logistics; Cold chain distribution; ISO tank solutions; Customs brokerage; Oversized cargo movement
- Parent: Miren Holdings Inc.
- Website: www.f2logistics.com

F2 Logistics Philippines, Inc. is a Philippine logistics company based in Parañaque. It was established by Efren Uy in 2006.

== Services ==
Among the services provided by F2 Logistics include warehousing, cold chain distribution, ISO tank solutions, customs brokerage, and oversized cargo movement. The company also provide international freight forwarding through its network of partner sea and airfreight firms. F2 Logistics deals with the transport of retail goods such as food items to supermarkets, fast food outlets, and other retail outlets as well as medicine to drugstores.

== Involvement in elections ==
F2 Logistics has been involved in the distribution of election equipment and paraphernalia in the Philippines. It was the national courier of the Commission on Elections (COMELEC) for the 2018 barangay and Sangguniang Kabataan elections. F2 Logistics has also secured two of four delivery contracts for the 2019 elections.

The company has also secured a distribution deal with the COMELEC for the 2022 national elections. The deal has been questioned by Senator Leila de Lima, the National Citizens' Movement for Free Elections, and other civic groups, due to F2 Logistics chairman Dennis Uy's association with incumbent President Rodrigo Duterte, believing that the company has a conflict of interest. Among the company's incorporators include the Duterte administration's executive secretary Salvador Medialdea. The COMELEC dispute the allegation, saying that the awarding of the associated contract was done through public bidding and that F2 Logistics was awarded the deal on the merit that the company offered the lowest responsive bid.

== Sports ==
F2 Logistics is also involved in sports. It formerly owned the F2 Logistics Cargo Movers, a women's volleyball team active from 2016 to 2023. It competed in the Philippine Super Liga and Premier Volleyball League. It also sponsors the La Salle women's volleyball team and the Parañaque Patriots basketball team of the Maharlika Pilipinas Basketball League.
