= 2025–26 Farm Fresh Foxies season =

Third season of the Farm Fresh Foxies

The 2025–26 Farm Fresh Foxies season was the third season of the Farm Fresh Foxies in the Premier Volleyball League (PVL). On May 6, 2025, Alessandro Lodi was appointed as the team's new head coach.

Despite notably acquiring Angelique Dionela and Rachel Daquis, the Foxies had a middling All-Filipino Conference, going 5–6 with 15 points, finishing sixth in the preliminary round. In the qualifying round, Farm Fresh fell to the Akari Chargers in five sets and were sent to the play-in tournament. Unfortunately, the team's downfall continued as they lost both matches and didn't make the final round.

Ahead of the preseason PVL on Tour, Farm Fresh continued to bolster its lineup with Frances Molina, Ria Meneses, and Des Clemente-de Guzman all joining the team. During the tournament, the team produced better results by going 3–2 in the prelims, earning nine points along the way, and beating the Capital1 Solar Spikers in straight sets to earn a berth into the final round. The team faced against perennial contenders Creamline Cool Smashers where they fell in a sweep.

The team was invited to take part in the following Invitational Conference to take up the slot vacated by the Kurashiki Ablaze, but instead gave it to sister team Zus Coffee Thunderbelles, who accepted it.

For the Reinforced Conference, Farm Fresh signed Belgian player Helene Rousseaux as their foreign guest player. With a 7–1 record, the Foxies tied with the Zus Coffee Thunderbelles for the best record in the prelims, but with 21 points over Zus Coffee's 20, the team claimed the first seed in the final round. Unfortunately, the team wasn't able to continue the momentum, as they were eliminated in straight sets by eight-seeded Akari in the quarterfinals.

On January 26, 2026, the Foxies acquired former Petro Gazz Angels captain Remy Palma as well as previous All-Premier Team selections Ara Galang and Mylene Paat, all of whom signed with owners Strong Group Athletics earlier in the off-season. Palma also joins the team as a playing assistant coach. On the other hand, the team lost Caitlin Viray to the Choco Mucho Flying Titans while Rachel Daquis switched to sister team Zus Coffee Thunderbelles.

== Roster ==
2024–25 Farm Fresh Foxies roster
No.	Player	Position	Height	Birth date	School
1	Alohi Robins-Hardy	Setter	1.90 m (6 ft 3 in)	November 30, 1995 (age 30)	BYU
3	Rachel Daquis	Outside hitter	1.77 m (5 ft 10 in)	December 13, 1987 (age 38)	FEU
4	Caitlin Viray	Opposite Hitter	1.72 m (5 ft 8 in)	April 12, 1998 (age 28)	UST
5	Alyssa Bertolano	Opposite Hitter	1.69 m (5 ft 7 in)	August 23, 2002 (age 23)	UP
6	Des Clemente-de Guzman	Middle Blocker	1.86 m (6 ft 1 in)	May 31, 1996 (age 30)	DLSU
7	Frances Xinia Molina	Outside Hitter	1.80 m (5 ft 11 in)	September 23, 1994 (age 31)	SBU
8	Jolina Dela Cruz	Outside Hitter	1.74 m (5 ft 9 in)	May 9, 1999 (age 27)	DLSU
9	Rizza Cruz	Middle Blocker	1.75 m (5 ft 9 in)	July 8, 2000 (age 26)	Adamson
10	Maicah Larroza	Outside Hitter	1.61 m (5 ft 3 in)	May 19, 2001 (age 25)	DLSU
11	Pierre Angeli Abellana	Outside Hitter	1.65 m (5 ft 5 in)	February 26, 2002 (age 24)	UST
12	Trisha Tubu	Opposite Hitter	1.73 m (5 ft 8 in)	October 24, 2000 (age 25)	Adamson
14	Jheck Dionela	Libero	1.50 m (4 ft 11 in)	January 26, 1991 (age 35)	UPHSD
17	Louie Romero (C)	Setter	1.60 m (5 ft 3 in)	July 5, 2000 (age 26)	AdU
18	Lorene Toring	Middle Blocker	1.83 m (6 ft 0 in)	February 17, 2000 (age 26)	Adamson
19	Helene Rousseaux	Outside Hitter	1.87 m (6 ft 2 in)	September 25, 1991 (age 34)	–
20	Ann Monares	Libero	1.78 m (5 ft 10 in)	August 22, 2002 (age 23)	FEU
21	Marivic Meneses	Middle Blocker	1.85 m (6 ft 1 in)	October 18, 1995 (age 30)	UST

Coaching staff

- Head coach:
  Alessandro Lodi
- Assistant coaches:
  Benson Bocboc
  Zolo Ligot
  Ron Medalla
  Ed Ortega

Team staff

- Team manager:
  Kiara Cruz

Medical staff

- Physical therapist:
  Louise Gopez
  Alfonso Donado

== Draft ==
Round	Pick	Player	Pos.	School
1	3	Alohi Robins-Hardy	S	BYU
2	16	Ann Monares	L	FEU

== PVL on Tour ==
=== Preliminary round ===
==== Pool A standings ====
Pos	Team	Pld	W	L	Pts	SW	SL	SR	SPW	SPL	SPR	Qualification
1	PLDT High Speed Hitters	5	5	0	15	15	1	15.000	400	298	1.342	Final round
2	Nxled Chameleons	5	4	1	11	12	6	2.000	408	381	1.071	Final round
3	Farm Fresh Foxies	5	3	2	9	9	7	1.286	359	371	0.968	Knockout round
4	Petro Gazz Angels	5	2	3	7	8	10	0.800	390	406	0.961	Knockout round
5	Choco Mucho Flying Titans	5	1	4	3	7	13	0.538	439	481	0.913	Knockout round

Source: PVL.ph

==== Match log ====
2025 PVL on Tour preliminary round match log
Total: 3–2 (9 points)
July: 3–2 (9 points)

Match	Date	Opponent	Sets	Total	Location Attendance	Record	Pts	Report
1	July 1, 2025	PLDT	0–3	65–78	Filoil Centre; 950	0–1	0	P2
2	July 12, 2025	Choco Mucho	3–1	99–91	Capital Arena; 4,889	1–1	3	P2
3	July 13, 2025	Petro Gazz	3–0	75–67	Capital Arena; 5,507	2–1	6	P2
4	July 26, 2,350	Galeries Tower	3–0	77–60	University of San Jose–Recoletos; 2,345	3–1	9	P2
5	July 27, 2025	Nxled	0–3	43–75	University of San Jose–Recoletos; 1,589	3–2	9	P2

=== Knockout round ===
==== Match log ====
2025 PVL on Tour knockout round match log
Total: 1–0 (3 points)
Knockout round: 1–0 (3 points)

Date	Opponent	Sets	Total	Location Attendance	Report
August 2, 2025	Capital1	3–0	75–56	City of Dasmariñas Arena	

=== Final round ===
==== Bracket ====
Quarterfinals
August 7
1 PLDT	3
8 Zus Coffee	0
August 9
4 Creamline	3
5 Farm Fresh	0
August 7
2 Cignal	3
7 Akari	0
August 9
3 Nxled	0
6 Chery Tiggo	3

Semifinals
August 12
PLDT	3
Creamline	2
August 12
Cignal	1
Chery Tiggo	3

Championship
August 17
PLDT	3
Chery Tiggo	2
3rd place match
August 17
Creamline	3
Cignal	0

==== Match log ====
2025 PVL on Tour final round match log
Total: 0–1 (0 points)
Quarterfinals: 0–1 (0 points)

Date	Opponent	Sets	Total	Location Attendance	Report
August 9, 2025	Creamline	0–3	62–76	PhilSports Arena; 3,162	P2

== Reinforced Conference ==
=== Preliminary round ===
==== Standings ====
Pos	Team	Pld	W	L	Pts	SW	SL	SR	SPW	SPL	SPR	Qualification
1	Farm Fresh Foxies	8	7	1	21	22	7	3.143	694	618	1.123	Quarterfinals
2	Zus Coffee Thunderbelles	8	7	1	20	21	8	2.625	688	596	1.154	Quarterfinals
3	PLDT High Speed Hitters	8	6	2	18	19	9	2.111	669	591	1.132	Quarterfinals
4	Creamline Cool Smashers	8	5	3	17	20	12	1.667	729	661	1.103	Quarterfinals
5	Petro Gazz Angels	8	5	3	14	17	14	1.214	718	669	1.073	Quarterfinals

Source: Premier Volleyball League

==== Match log ====
2025 PVL Reinforced Conference preliminary round match log
Total: 7–1 (21 points)
First round: 4–1 (12 points)

Match	Date	Opponent	Sets	Total	Location Attendance	Record	Pts	Report
1	October 9, 2025	Nxled	3–1	97–88	City of Dasmariñas Arena; 670	1–0	3	P2
2	October 16, 2025	Cignal	3–0	75–55	Smart Araneta Coliseum; 721	2–0	6	P2
3	October 21, 2025	Capital1	3–1	97–90	Smart Araneta Coliseum; 790	3–0	9	P2
4	October 25, 2025	PLDT	1–3	78–97	Ynares Center Montalban; 810	3–1	9	P2
5	October 31, 2025	Choco Mucho	3–1	94–80	Filoil Centre; 2,278	4–1	12	P2

Second round: 3–0 (9 points)

Match	Date	Opponent	Sets	Total	Location Attendance	Record	Pts	Report
6	November 11, 2025	Petro Gazz	3–1	99–94	Filoil Centre; 387	5–1	15	P2
7	November 15, 2025	Galeries Tower	3–0	75–47	Ynares Center Montalban; 148	6–1	18	P2
8	November 20, 2025	Chery Tiggo	3–0	79–67	SM Mall of Asia Arena; 1,274	7–1	21	P2

=== Final round ===
==== Bracket ====
Quarterfinals
November 24
Farm Fresh	0
Akari	3
November 24
Creamline	1
Petro Gazz	3
November 24
Zus Coffee	3
Capital1	0
November 24
PLDT	3
Cignal	1

Semifinals
November 27
Akari	2
Petro Gazz	3
November 27
Zus Coffee	3
PLDT	0

Championship
November 30
Petro Gazz	3
Zus Coffee	1
3rd-place match
November 30
Akari	3
PLDT	2

==== Match log ====
2025 PVL Reinforced Conference final round match log
Total: 0–1 (0 points)
Quarterfinals: 0–1 (0 points)

Date	Opponent	Sets	Total	Location Attendance	Report
November 24, 2025	Akari	0–3	75–83	Smart Araneta Coliseum	P2

== All-Filipino Conference ==
=== Preliminary round ===
==== Standings ====
Pos	Team	Pld	W	L	Pts	SW	SL	SR	SPW	SPL	SPR	Qualification
2	Cignal Super Spikers	9	6	3	20	22	11	2.000	772	687	1.124	Qualifying round
3	Creamline Cool Smashers	9	6	3	16	20	16	1.250	700	662	1.057	Qualifying round
4	Farm Fresh Foxies	9	5	4	17	22	16	1.375	850	771	1.102	Qualifying round
5	Nxled Chameleons	9	5	4	15	20	16	1.250	810	773	1.048	Play-in tournament semifinals
6	Akari Chargers	9	5	4	15	19	18	1.056	792	838	0.945	Play-in tournament semifinals

Source: Premier Volleyball League

==== Match log ====
2026 PVL All-Filipino Conference preliminary round match log
Total: 5–4 (17 points)
February: 2–3 (8 points)

Match	Date	Opponent	Sets	Total	Location Attendance	Record	Pts	Report
1	February 3, 2026	Nxled	2–3	100–99	Filoil Centre; 636	0–1	1	P2
2	February 10, 2026	Cignal	1–3	94–101	SM Mall of Asia Arena; 6,167	0–2	1	P2
3	February 14, 2026	Galeries Tower	3–0	75–41	Ynares Center Antipolo; 673	1–2	4	P2
4	February 21, 2026	Zus Coffee	3–0	75–50	Filoil Centre; 3,570	2–2	7	P2
5	February 26, 2026	Capital1	2–3	111–109	Filoil Centre; 824	2–3	8	P2

March: 3–1 (9 points)

Match	Date	Opponent	Sets	Total	Location Attendance	Record	Pts	Report
6	March 5, 2026	PLDT	2–3	102–111	Filoil Centre; 440	0–1	9	P2
7	March 10, 2026	Choco Mucho	3–2	102–99	Filoil Centre; 897	1–1	11	P2
8	March 17, 2026	Creamline	3–1	93–86	Filoil Centre; 2,605	2–1	14	P2
9	March 21, 2026	Akari	3–1	98–75	Filoil Centre; 2,845	3–1	17	P2

=== Qualifying round ===
==== Match log ====
2026 PVL All-Filipino Conference qualifying round match log
Total: 0–1 (0 points)
Qualifying round: 0–1 (0 points)

Date	Opponent	Sets	Total	Location Attendance	Report
March 26, 2026	PLDT	1–3	85–93	Smart Araneta Coliseum; 1,534	P2

=== Play-in tournament ===
==== Pool A ====
Play-in pool A quarterfinal
8	Capital1	0
9	Galeries Tower	3

Play-in pool A semifinal
5	Nxled	3
9	Galeries Tower	0

Play-in pool A final
4	Farm Fresh	3
5	Nxled	0

==== Match log ====
2026 PVL All-Filipino Conference play-in tournament match log
Total: 1–0 (3 points)
Play-in tournament: 1–0 (3 points)

Date	Opponent	Sets	Total	Location Attendance	Report
April 7, 2026	Nxled	3–0	75–56	Filoil Centre; 2,466	P2

=== Semifinal round ===
==== Standings ====
Pos	Team	Pld	W	L	Pts	SW	SL	SR	SPW	SPL	SPR	Qualification
1	Cignal Super Spikers	3	2	1	6	6	5	1.200	248	207	1.198	Finals
2	Creamline Cool Smashers	3	2	1	5	7	6	1.167	270	289	0.934	Finals
3	PLDT High Speed Hitters	3	1	2	4	6	6	1.000	276	266	1.038	Third place series
4	Farm Fresh Foxies	3	1	2	3	5	7	0.714	245	278	0.881	Third place series

Source: Premier Volleyball League

==== Match log ====
2026 PVL All-Filipino Conference semifinal round match log
Total: 1–2 (3 points)
Semifinals: 1–2 (3 points)

Match	Date	Opponent	Sets	Total	Location Attendance	Record	Pts	Report
1	April 11, 2026	Cignal	1–3	62–98	SM Mall of Asia Arena; 7,041	0–1	0	P2
2	April 14, 2026	PLDT	3–1	93–90	SM Mall of Asia Arena; 6,047	1–1	3	P2
3	April 16, 2026	Creamline	1–3	90–89	Filoil Centre; 3,622	1–2	3	P2

=== 3rd place series ===
==== Match log ====
2026 PVL All-Filipino Conference 3rd place series match log
Total: 0–2 (2 points)
3rd place: 0–2 (2 points)

Match	Date	Opponent	Sets	Total	Location Attendance	Record	Pts	Report
1	April 21, 2026	PLDT	2–3	110–115	Smart Araneta Coliseum; 3,214	0–1	1	P2
2	April 23, 2026	PLDT	2–3	90–107	Smart Araneta Coliseum; 8,609	0–2	2	P2

== Transactions ==
=== Additions ===
Player	Date signed	Previous team	Ref.
Alohi Robins-Hardy	June 8, 2025	VK Dukla Liberec (Czech Women's Volleyball Extraliga)	
Ann Monares	June 11, 2025	FEU Lady Tamaraws (UAAP)	
Des Clemente-de Guzman	June 13, 2025	Capital1 Solar Spikers	
Ria Meneses	July 8, 2025	Cignal HD Spikers	
Frances Molina	July 8, 2025	Cignal HD Spikers	
Royse Tubino	January 2, 2026 (Note: The player was initially signed to the Strong Group Athletics organization before being assigned to Farm Fresh on January 26, 2026.)	Choco Mucho Flying Titans	
Bia General	January 3, 2026	Choco Mucho Flying Titans	
Remy Palma	January 5, 2026	Petro Gazz Angels	
Imee Hernandez	January 6, 2026	Chery Tiggo EV Crossovers	
Mylene Paat	January 7, 2026	Chery Tiggo EV Crossovers	
Ara Galang	January 8, 2026	Chery Tiggo EV Crossovers	

=== Subtractions ===
Player	New team	Ref.
Rachel Daquis	Zus Coffee Thunderbelles	
Janel Delerio	Nxled Chameleons	
Caitlin Viray	Choco Mucho Flying Titans	

=== Foreign guest player ===
Team	Foreign player	Moving from	Ref.
Farm Fresh Foxies	(Belgium) Helene Rousseaux	(Turkey) Papara Göztepe	

=== Coaching changes ===
Team	Outgoing coach	Manner of departure	Replaced by	Ref
Farm Fresh Foxies	(Philippines) Benson Bocboc	Replaced	(Italy) Alessandro Lodi	
Farm Fresh Foxies	(Italy) Alessandro Lodi	Resigned	(Japan) Koji Tsuzurabara	
