= 2026–27 Farm Fresh Foxies season =

Filipino women's volleyball team season

The 2026–27 Farm Fresh Foxies season will be the fourth season of the Farm Fresh Foxies in the Premier Volleyball League (PVL).

In the PVL on Tour. The Farm Fresh Foxies opens their PVL on Tour Showdown campaign on July 11, 2026 with a four-sets loss to Galeries Tower Highrisers in Batangas City, Batangas. On August 15, 2026, the Foxies notched their first win with a straight-sets sweep of Nxled Chameleons in Tubod, Lanao del Norte. Farm Fresh wraps up their on tour caravan with a 2–1 record after outlasting the Capital1 Solar Spikers in a five-set thriller on August 22, 2026 in Victorias City, Negros Occidental.

In the Invitational Conference, Farm Fresh settled for a fifth place in the prelims with a 1–4 record with 4 points, the Foxies then caps their Invitational run vs Ho Chi Minh City in fifth place.

== Roster ==
Farm Fresh Foxies roster
No.	Nat.	Player	Pos.	Height	DOB	From
1	(Philippines) (United States)	Alohi Robins-Hardy (C)	Setter	1.90 m (6 ft 3 in)	November 30, 1995 (age 30)	BYU
2	(Philippines)	Roselyn Doria	Middle Blocker	1.78 m (5 ft 10 in)	September 2, 1996 (age 30)	National-U
3	(Philippines)	Kamille Cal	Setter	1.70 m (5 ft 7 in)	April 25, 2001 (age 25)	National-U
4	(Philippines)	Ara Galang	Outside Hitter	1.73 m (5 ft 8 in)	January 4, 1995 (age 31)	De La Salle
5	(Philippines)	Bia General	Libero	1.65 m (5 ft 5 in)	August 27, 1995 (age 31)	National-U
7	(Philippines)	Frances Molina	Outside Hitter	1.80 m (5 ft 11 in)	September 23, 1994 (age 32)	San Beda
8	(Philippines)	Mylene Paat	Opposite Hitter	1.80 m (5 ft 11 in)	April 5, 1994 (age 32)	Adamson
9	(Philippines)	Rizza Cruz	Middle Blocker	1.75 m (5 ft 9 in)	July 8, 2000 (age 26)	Adamson
10	(Philippines)	Maicah Larroza	Libero	1.61 m (5 ft 3 in)	May 19, 2001 (age 25)	De La Salle
12	(Philippines)	Trisha Tubu	Opposite Hitter	1.74 m (5 ft 9 in)	October 24, 2000 (age 26)	Adamson
13	(Philippines)	Jonna Perdido	Outside Hitter	1.75 m (5 ft 9 in)	December 12, 2002 (age 23)	UST
14	(Philippines)	Pierre Abellana	Outside Hitter	1.65 m (5 ft 5 in)	February 26, 2002 (age 24)	UST
15	(Philippines)	Royse Tubino	Outside Hitter	1.75 m (5 ft 9 in)	January 12, 1993 (age 33)	UPHSD
16	(Philippines)	Remy Palma	Middle Blocker	1.77 m (5 ft 10 in)	September 8, 1995 (age 31)	Far Eastern
17	(Philippines)	Louie Romero	Setter	1.60 m (5 ft 3 in)	July 5, 2000 (age 26)	Adamson
18	(Philippines)	Riri Meneses	Middle Blocker	1.85 m (6 ft 1 in)	October 18, 1995 (age 31)	UST
19	(Philippines)	Ela Raagas	Setter	1.70 m (5 ft 7 in)	March 12, 2004 (age 22)	De La Salle
22	(Philippines)	Renee Peñafiel	Outside Hitter	1.64 m (5 ft 5 in)	July 26, 2002 (age 24)	UST
24	(Philippines)	Buding Duremdes	Libero	1.57 m (5 ft 2 in)	June 7, 1998 (age 28)	Far Eastern
Updated as of: October 22, 2026 | Source: PVL.ph

Coaching staff

- Head coach:
  Koji Tsuzurabara
- Assistant coaches:
  Kungfu Reyes
  Robertly Boto
  Zolo Ligot
  Ron Medalla
  Christian Mark Detablan
  Erickson Ramos
- Statistician:
  Benson Bocboc
  Darius Francis Udarbe
- Team consultant:
  Shaq Delos Santos

Team staff

- Team manager:
  Kiara Cruz
- Team coordinator:
  Gizelle Sy

Medical staff

- Physical therapist:
  Christine Magtibay

== Draft ==
Round	Pick	Player	Pos.	School
1	6	Jonna Perdido	OH	UST
2	11	Ela Raagas	S	La Salle

== PVL on Tour ==
=== Results summary ===
Team	Game		
Team	1	2	3
Farm Fresh (FFF)	GTH; 1–3	NXL; 3–0	CAP; 3–2

Source: Premier Volleyball League
Legend: Blue = win; Red = loss

== Invitational Conference ==
The Farm Fresh Foxies qualified for the Invitational Conference for reaching the semifinals of the All-Filipino Conference.

=== Preliminary round ===
==== Standings ====
Pos	Team	Pld	W	L	Pts	SW	SL	SR	SPW	SPL	SPR	Qualification
2	Nxled Chameleons	5	3	2	10	12	8	1.500	476	452	1.053	Finals
3	Creamline Cool Smashers	5	3	2	9	12	9	1.333	480	426	1.127	Third place match
4	PLDT High Speed Hitters	5	3	2	8	10	10	1.000	457	437	1.046	Third place match
5	Farm Fresh Foxies	5	1	4	4	7	13	0.538	426	455	0.936	Fifth place match
6	Ho Chi Minh City	5	1	4	3	5	13	0.385	373	447	0.834	Fifth place match

Source: Premier Volleyball League

==== Match log ====
2026 PVL Invitational Conference preliminary round match log
Total: 1–4 (4 points)
August: 1–0 (3 points)

Match	Date	Opponent	Sets	Total	Location Attendance	Record	Pts	Report
1	August 31, 2026	Ho Chi Minh City	3–1	101–77	Smart Araneta Coliseum; 2,700	1–0	3	P2

September: 0–4 (1 point)

Match	Date	Opponent	Sets	Total	Location Attendance	Record	Pts	Report
2	September 1, 2026	Est Cola	0–3	59–75	Smart Araneta Coliseum; 606	1–1	3	P2
3	September 3, 2026	Creamline	2–3	95–112	Smart Araneta Coliseum; 850	1–2	4	P2
4	September 4, 2026	PLDT	1–3	83–98	Smart Araneta Coliseum; 397	1–3	4	P2
5	September 6, 2026	Nxled	1–3	88–93	Smart Araneta Coliseum; 2,400	1–4	4	P2

=== Final round ===
==== Match log ====
2026 PVL Invitational Conference final round match log
Total: 1–0 (3 points)
Fifth-place match: 1–0 (3 points)

Date	Opponent	Sets	Total	Location Attendance	Report
September 8, 2026	Ho Chi Minh City	3–0	75–45	Smart Araneta Coliseum; 531	P2

== All-Filipino Conference ==
=== Preliminary round ===
==== Standings ====
Pos	Team	Pld	W	L	Pts	SW	SL	SR	SPW	SPL	SPR	Qualification
2	Creamline Cool Smashers	8	5	3	16	19	11	1.727	701	641	1.094	Twice-to-beat in semifinals
3	Choco Mucho Flying Titans	8	5	3	15	20	15	1.333	783	736	1.064	Twice-to-win in semifinals
4	Farm Fresh Foxies	8	5	3	14	19	16	1.188	758	755	1.004	Twice-to-win in semifinals
5	PLDT High Speed Hitters	8	4	4	13	15	15	1.000	677	666	1.017	
6	Akari Chargers	8	3	5	9	14	19	0.737	724	745	0.972	

Source: Premier Volleyball League

==== Match log ====
2026–27 PVL All-Filipino Conference Siklab series preliminary round match log
Total: 5–3 (14 points)
October: 2–2 (7 points)

Match	Date	Opponent	Sets	Total	Location Attendance	Record	Pts	Report
1	October 10, 2026	Galeries Tower	3–0	75–60	Smart Araneta Coliseum; 235	1–0	3	P2
2	October 17, 2026	Nxled	2–3	98–108	Filoil Centre; 532	1–1	4	P2
3	October 22, 2026	Choco Mucho	3–2	111–112	SM Mall of Asia Arena; 1,163	2–1	6	P2
4	October 27, 2026	Akari	2–3	109–112	Ninoy Aquino Stadium; 268	2–2	7	P2

November: 3–1 (7 points)

Match	Date	Opponent	Sets	Total	Location Attendance	Record	Pts	Report
5	November 5, 2026	Zus Coffee	3–2	102–100	PhilSports Arena; 342	3–2	9	P2
6	November 10, 2026	PLDT	3–2	110–102	Smart Araneta Coliseum; 194	4–2	11	P2
7	November 14, 2026	Capital1	3–1	98–86	PhilSports Arena; 1,095	5–2	14	P2
8	November 21, 2026	Creamline	0–3	55–75	PhilSports Arena; 1,870	5–3	14	P2

== Transactions ==
=== Additions ===
Player	Date signed	Previous team	Ref.
Roselyn Doria	June 1, 2026	Cignal Super Spikers	
Buding Duremdes	June 1, 2026	Cignal Super Spikers	
Iris Tolenada	June 28, 2026	Capital1 Solar Spikers	
Zenneth Perolino	July 6, 2026	PLDT High Speed Hitters	
Renee Penafiel	July 6, 2026	Zus Coffee Thunderbelles	
Jonna Perdido	July 6, 2026	UST Golden Tigresses (UAAP)	
Ela Raagas	July 6, 2026	DLSU Lady Spikers (UAAP)	
Ethan Arce	August 23, 2026	Cignal Super Spikers	
Kamille Cal	September 2, 2026	Akari Chargers	
Bea Bonafe	September 2, 2026	Akari Chargers	

=== Subtractions ===
Player	New team	Ref.
Ann Monares	Akari Chargers	
Alyssa Bertolano	Galeries Tower Highrisers	
Jolina Dela Cruz	Zus Coffee Thunderbelles	
Iris Tolenada	Free agent	
Lorene Toring	Choco Mucho Flying Titans	
