= 2024–25 Farm Fresh Foxies season =

Filipino women's volleyball team season

The 2024–25 Farm Fresh Foxies season was the second season of the Farm Fresh Foxies in the Premier Volleyball League (PVL).

On October 31, 2024, Benson Bocboc was named the team's interim head coach, replacing Shota Sato.

Despite notably acquiring Angelique Dionela and Rachel Daquis, the Foxies had a middling All-Filipino Conference, going 5–6 with 15 points, finishing sixth in the preliminary round. In the qualifying round, Farm Fresh fell to the Akari Chargers in five sets and were sent to the play-in tournament. Unfortunately, the team's downfall continued as they lost both matches and did not make the final round.

== Roster ==
Farm Fresh Foxies
No.	Player	Position	Height	Birth date	School
1	Sofia Ildefonso	Middle Blocker	1.75 m (5 ft 9 in)	September 25, 2002 (age 23)	Ateneo
3	Rachel Daquis	Outside hitter	1.77 m (5 ft 10 in)	December 13, 1987 (age 38)	FEU
4	Caitlin Viray	Opposite Hitter	1.72 m (5 ft 8 in)	April 12, 1998 (age 28)	UST
5	Alyssa Bertolano	Opposite Hitter	1.69 m (5 ft 7 in)	August 23, 2002 (age 24)	UP
7	Louie Romero (C)	Setter	1.60 m (5 ft 3 in)	July 5, 2000 (age 26)	AdU
8	Jolina Dela Cruz	Outside Hitter	1.74 m (5 ft 9 in)	May 9, 1999 (age 27)	DLSU
10	Maicah Larroza	Universal	1.61 m (5 ft 3 in)	May 19, 2001 (age 25)	DLSU
11	Pierre Angeli Abellana	Outside Hitter	1.65 m (5 ft 5 in)	February 26, 2002 (age 24)	UST
12	Trisha Tubu	Opposite Hitter	1.73 m (5 ft 8 in)	October 24, 2000 (age 25)	Adamson
13	Aprylle Tagsip	Middle Blocker	1.80 m (5 ft 11 in)	April 13, 2001 (age 25)	Adamson
14	Jheck Dionela	Libero	1.50 m (4 ft 11 in)	January 26, 1991 (age 35)	UPHSD
15	Elaine Kasilag	Opposite Hitter	1.80 m (5 ft 11 in)	August 15, 1994 (age 32)	DLSU – Dasmariñas
16	Rizza Cruz	Middle Blocker	1.75 m (5 ft 9 in)	July 8, 2000 (age 26)	Adamson
17	Janel Delerio	Libero	1.57 m (5 ft 2 in)	June 21, 1999 (age 27)	UST
18	Lorene Toring	Middle Blocker	1.83 m (6 ft 0 in)	February 17, 2000 (age 26)	Adamson

Coaching staff

- Head coach:
  Benson Bocboc
- Assistant coaches:
  Zolo Ligot
  Ron Medalla
  Ed Ortega
  Alohi Robins-Hardy

Team staff

- Team manager:
  Kiara Cruz

Medical staff

- Physical therapist:
  Louise Gopez
  Alfonso Donado

== 2024 All-Filipino Conference ==
=== Preliminary round ===
==== Standings ====
Pos	Team	Pld	W	L	Pts	SW	SL	SR	SPW	SPL	SPR
7	Akari Chargers	11	5	6	15	17	18	0.944	767	750	1.023
8	Nxled Chameleons	11	4	7	11	14	23	0.609	794	824	0.964
9	Farm Fresh Foxies	11	3	8	11	14	24	0.583	785	863	0.910
10	Galeries Tower Highrisers	11	3	8	9	11	26	0.423	689	832	0.828
11	Capital1 Solar Spikers	11	1	10	4	5	31	0.161	631	860	0.734

Source: TeamPilipinas.info

==== Match log ====
2024 PVL All-Filipino Conference preliminary round match log
Total: 3–8 (11 points)
February: 1–1 (3 points)

Match	Date	Opponent	Sets	Total	Location Attendance	Record	Pts	Report
1	February 24, 2024	Creamline	1–3	96–109	Smart Araneta Coliseum; 3,168	0–1	0	P2
2	February 29, 2024	Capital1	3–0	75–50	PhilSports Arena; 1,516	1–1	3	P2

March: 1–3 (3 points)

Match	Date	Opponent	Sets	Total	Location Attendance	Record	Pts	Report
3	March 5, 2024	Akari	0–3	56–75	PhilSports Arena; 329	1–2	3	P2
4	March 9, 2024	Chery Tiggo	3–0	75–61	Filoil EcoOil Centre; 1,234	2–2	6	P2
5	March 14, 2024	Petro Gazz	0–3	65–77	PhilSports Arena; 1,779	2–3	6	P2
6	March 23, 2024	PLDT	0–3	43–75	Ynares Center; 3,070	2–4	6	P2

April: 1–4 (5 points)

Match	Date	Opponent	Sets	Total	Location Attendance	Record	Pts	Report
7	April 4, 2024	Cignal	0–3	39–75	PhilSports Arena; 293	2–5	6	P2
8	April 9, 2024	Nxled	2–3	105–109	PhilSports Arena; 419	2–6	7	P2
9	April 13, 2024	Galeries Tower	0–3	57–75	PhilSports Arena; 2,523	2–7	7	P2
10	April 18, 2024	Strong Group	3–0	75–47	Smart Araneta Coliseum; 8,264	3–7	10	P2
11	April 23, 2024	Choco Mucho	2–3	99–110	PhilSports Arena; 1,113	3–8	11	P2

== Draft ==
Round	Pick	Player	Pos.	School
1	4	Maicah Larroza	OH/L	DLSU
2	16	Pierre Abellana	OH	UST

== Reinforced Conference ==
=== Preliminary round ===
==== Standings ====
Pos	Team	Pld	W	L	Pts	SW	SL	SR	SPW	SPL	SPR	Qualification
6	Petro Gazz Angels	8	5	3	14	17	13	1.308	676	638	1.060	Quarterfinals
7	Capital1 Solar Spikers	8	5	3	13	17	15	1.133	688	677	1.016	Quarterfinals
8	Farm Fresh Foxies	8	3	5	8	11	17	0.647	575	576	0.998	Quarterfinals
9	Choco Mucho Flying Titans	8	2	6	7	11	21	0.524	661	693	0.954	
10	Nxled Chameleons	8	1	7	3	6	23	0.261	510	609	0.837	

Source: Premier Volleyball League

==== Match log ====
2024 PVL Reinforced Conference preliminary round match log
Total: 3–5 (8 points)
July: 1–2 (2 points)

Match	Date	Opponent	Sets	Total	Location Attendance	Record	Pts	Report
1	July 16, 2024	Chery Tiggo	0–3	60–77	PhilSports Arena; 1,890	0–1	0	P2
2	July 20, 2024	Creamline	1–3	86–99	PhilSports Arena; 1,991	0–2	0	P2
3	July 30, 2024	Galeries Tower	3–2	123–114	PhilSports Arena; 992	1–2	2	P2

August: 2–3 (6 points)

Match	Date	Opponent	Sets	Total	Location Attendance	Record	Pts	Report
4	August 3, 2024	Nxled	3–0	75–48	PhilSports Arena; 810	2–2	5	P2
5	August 8, 2024	PLDT	0–3	66–75	PhilSports Arena; 416	2–3	5	P2
6	August 10, 2024	Cignal	1–3	90–103	PhilSports Arena; 570	2–4	5	P2
7	August 15, 2024	Capital1	3–0	75–60	PhilSports Arena; 382	3–4	8	P2
8	August 20, 2024	Akari	0–3	60–75	Filoil EcoOil Centre; 310	3–5	8	P2

=== Final round ===
==== Bracket ====
Quarterfinals
August 24
1 Akari	3
8 Farm Fresh	1
August 27
4 PLDT	3
5 Chery Tiggo	2
August 24
2 Cignal	3
7 Capital1	2
August 27
3 Creamline	3
6 Petro Gazz	0

Semifinals
August 31
Akari	3
PLDT	2
August 31
Cignal	2
Creamline	3

Championship
September 4
Akari	0
Creamline	3
3rd place match
September 4
PLDT	1
Cignal	3

==== Match log ====
2024 PVL Reinforced Conference final round match log
Total: 0–1 (0 points)
Quarterfinals: 0–1 (0 points)

Date	Opponent	Sets	Total	Location Attendance	Report
August 24, 2024	Akari	1–3	88–92	Filoil EcoOil Centre; 1,301	P2

== Invitational Conference ==
The Farm Fresh Foxies accepted to replace PLDT after the next three ranked teams Chery Tiggo, Petro Gazz and Capital1 declined the PVL's invite. PLDT qualified as semifinalists but withdrew due to injuries from the past reinforced conference.

=== Preliminary round ===
==== Standings ====
Pos	Team	Pld	W	L	Pts	SW	SL	SR	SPW	SPL	SPR	Qualification
1	Creamline Cool Smashers	4	4	0	12	12	2	6.000	347	270	1.285	Championship match
2	Cignal HD Spikers	4	3	1	8	10	5	2.000	348	307	1.134	Championship match
3	Kurashiki Ablaze	4	2	2	7	9	7	1.286	373	364	1.025	3rd place match
4	Est Cola	4	1	3	2	4	11	0.364	292	352	0.830	3rd place match
5	Farm Fresh Foxies	4	0	4	1	2	12	0.167	238	333	0.715	

Source: Premier Volleyball League

==== Match log ====
2024 PVL Invitational Conference preliminary round match log
Total: 0–4 (1 point)
September: 0–4 (1 point)

Match	Date	Opponent	Sets	Total	Location Attendance	Record	Pts	Report
1	September 5, 2024	Kurashiki	0–3	45–75	PhilSports Arena; 165	0–1	0	P2
2	September 6, 2024	Cignal	0–3	44–75	Santa Rosa Sports Complex; 1,609	0–2	0	P2
3	September 9, 2024	Est Cola	2–3	102–108	SM Mall of Asia Arena; 761	0–3	1	P2
3	September 11, 2024	Creamline	0–3	47–75	PhilSports Arena; 551	0–4	1	P2

== 2024–25 All-Filipino Conference ==
=== Preliminary round ===
==== Standings ====
Pos	Team	Pld	W	L	Pts	SW	SL	SR	SPW	SPL	SPR	Qualification
4	PLDT High Speed Hitters	11	8	3	23	27	13	2.077	927	842	1.101	Qualifying round
5	Choco Mucho Flying Titans	11	8	3	20	27	20	1.350	1064	1031	1.032	Qualifying round
6	Farm Fresh Foxies	11	5	6	15	18	22	0.818	847	915	0.926	Qualifying round
7	Akari Chargers	11	5	6	15	16	22	0.727	844	868	0.972	Qualifying round
8	Chery Tiggo Crossovers	11	5	6	14	20	24	0.833	957	966	0.991	Qualifying round

Source: Premier Volleyball League

==== Match log ====
2024–25 PVL All-Filipino Conference preliminary round match log
Total: 5–6 (15 points)
November: 1–2 (3 points)

Match	Date	Opponent	Sets	Total	Location Attendance	Record	Pts	Report
1	November 16, 2024	Cignal	0–3	54–75	Ynares Center; 3,853	0–1	0	P2
2	November 23, 2024	Petro Gazz	0–3	57–75	Candon City Arena; 3,947	0–2	0	P2
3	November 30, 2024	Akari	3–0	75–58	PhilSports Arena; 751	1–2	3	P2

December: 1–1 (4 points)

Match	Date	Opponent	Sets	Total	Location Attendance	Record	Pts	Report
4	December 5, 2024	Zus Coffee	3–1	89–89	Smart Araneta Coliseum; 405	2–2	6	P2
5	December 12, 2024	Choco Mucho	2–3	105–111	PhilSports Arena; 3,071	2–3	7	P2

January: 2–1 (6 points)

Match	Date	Opponent	Sets	Total	Location Attendance	Record	Pts	Report
6	January 18, 2025	Nxled	3–0	76–67	PhilSports Arena; 1,426	3–3	10	P2
7	January 25, 2025	Chery Tiggo	1–3	76–96	PhilSports Arena; 500	3–4	10	P2
8	January 30, 2025	Galeries Tower	3–1	95–87	PhilSports Arena; 480	4–4	13	P2

February: 1–2 (2 points)

Match	Date	Opponent	Sets	Total	Location Attendance	Record	Pts	Report
9	February 4, 2025	PLDT	0–3	56–75	PhilSports Arena; 325	4–5	13	P2
10	February 11, 2025	Creamline	0–3	59–77	PhilSports Arena; 1,798	4–6	13	P2
11	February 18, 2025	Capital1	3–2	105–105	PhilSports Arena; 878	5–6	15	P2

=== Qualifying round ===
==== Match log ====
2024–25 PVL All-Filipino Conference qualifying round match log
Total: 0–1 (1 point)
Qualifying round: 0–1 (1 point)

Date	Opponent	Sets	Total	Location Attendance	Report
March 4, 2025	Akari	2–3	91–106	PhilSports Arena; 442	P2

=== Play-in tournament ===
==== Pool B standings ====
Pos	Team	Pld	W	L	Pts	SW	SL	SR	SPW	SPL	SPR	Qualification
1	Chery Tiggo Crossovers	2	2	0	6	6	1	6.000	170	153	1.111	Final round
2	Nxled Chameleons	2	1	1	3	3	3	1.000	133	128	1.039	
3	Farm Fresh Foxies	2	0	2	0	1	6	0.167	147	169	0.870	

Source: Premier Volleyball League

==== Match log ====
2024–25 PVL All-Filipino Conference play-in tournament match log
Total: 0–2 (0 points)
Play-in tournament: 0–2 (0 points)

Match	Date	Opponent	Sets	Total	Location Attendance	Record	Pts	Report
1	March 11, 2025	Chery Tiggo	1–3	95–94	PhilSports Arena; 311	0–1	0	P2
2	March 13, 2025	Nxled	0–3	52–75	PhilSports Arena; 260	0–2	0	P2

== Transactions ==
=== Additions ===
Player	Date signed	Previous team	Ref.
Caitlin Viray	January 13, 2024	Choco Mucho Flying Titans	
Jolina Dela Cruz	January 13, 2024	F2 Logistics Cargo Movers	
Angelica Legacion	January 13, 2024	PLDT High Speed Hitters	
Jaycel Delos Reyes	January 13, 2024	Chery Tiggo Crossovers	
Chinnie Pia Arroyo	January 13, 2024	F2 Logistics Cargo Movers	
Elaine Kasilag	January 13, 2024	F2 Logistics Cargo Movers	
Julia Angeles	January 13, 2024	Galeries Tower Highrisers	
Janel Delerio	January 13, 2024	Nasipit Lady Spikers (MPVA)	
Ypril Tapia	January 13, 2024	San Juan Lady Knights (MPVA)	
Lorene Toring	February 15, 2024	Adamson Lady Falcons (UAAP)	
Maicah Larroza	July 9, 2024	DLSU Lady Spikers (UAAP)	
Pierre Abellana	July 10, 2024	UST Golden Tigresses (UAAP)	
Angelique Dionela	October 19, 2024	Cignal HD Spikers	
Rachel Daquis	October 25, 2024	Cignal HD Spikers	
AJ Jingco	November 17, 2024	Cignal HD Spikers	
Jane Gonzales	January 16, 2025	Army–Black Mamba Lady Troopers	

=== Subtractions ===
Player	New team	Ref.
Julia Angeles	Zus Coffee Thunderbelles	
Jaycel Delos Reyes	Zus Coffee Thunderbelles	
Ypril Tapia	Zus Coffee Thunderbelles	
Chinnie Pia Arroyo	Zus Coffee Thunderbelles	
Joan Narit	Zus Coffee Thunderbelles	
Kate Santiago	Zus Coffee Thunderbelles	
Angelica Legacion	PLDT High Speed Hitters	

=== Foreign guest player ===
Team	Foreign player	Moving from	Ref.
Farm Fresh Foxies	(Colombia) Yeny Murillo	(Czech Republic) TJ Sokol Frýdek-Místek	
Farm Fresh Foxies	(Japan) Asaka Tamaru	(Philippines) Zus Coffee Thunderbelles	

=== Coaching changes ===
Team	Outgoing coach	Manner of departure	Replaced by	Ref
Farm Fresh Foxies	(Philippines) Jerry Yee	moved to Zus Coffee Thunderbelles	(Japan) Shota Sato	
Farm Fresh Foxies	(Japan) Shota Sato	Replaced	(Philippines) Benson Bocboc	
