= 2024 Premier Volleyball League All-Filipino Conference =

First conference of the 2024 PVL season

- Duration: February 20 – May 12, 2024
- Teams: 12
- Matches: 76
- Attendance: 207,640 (2,732 per match)
- TV partner(s): One Sports; One Sports+ Pilipinas Live

Results
- Champions: Creamline Cool Smashers
- Runners-up: Choco Mucho Flying Titans
- Third place: Petro Gazz Angels
- Fourth place: Chery Tiggo Crossovers

Awards
- Conference MVP: Brooke Van Sickle
- Finals MVP: Jema Galanza
- Best OH: Sisi Rondina; Jema Galanza
- Best MB: Maddie Madayag; Jeanette Panaga
- Best OPP: Aiza Maizo-Pontillas
- Best Setter: Kyle Negrito
- Best Libero: Thang Ponce

PVL All-Filipino Conference chronology
- < 2023 Second 2024–25 >

PVL conference chronology
- < 2023 Second All-Filipino 2024 Reinforced >

The 2024 Premier Volleyball League All-Filipino Conference was the first conference of the 2024–25 Premier Volleyball League season. This conference was supposed to begin on February 17, 2024, but was later moved to February 20, 2024.

A total of twelve teams competed in this tournament; two new club teams were announced before the start of the conference. Meanwhile, the F2 Logistics Cargo Movers and Quezon City Gerflor Defenders withdrew from the PVL. Strong Group Athletics took over the Gerflor Defenders franchise. Capital1 Solar Spikers was unveiled as the 12th team and replaced the Cargo Movers.

== Changes ==
=== Issuance of green card ===
The league introduced green card for the first time, which is given to a team or player that admits fault to the referee. It is also to promote fair play, streamlining the adjudication process and minimizing the need for unnecessary video challenges.

=== Timeouts and challenges ===
The league reverted its traditional two technical timeouts, each lasting one minute, and two team timeouts lasting 30 seconds. Moreover, the players must now remain on the playing court during video challenges.

== Participating teams ==
2024 Premier Volleyball League All-Filipino Conference
Abbr.	Team	Affiliation	Head coach	Team captain
AKA	Akari Chargers	Akari Lighting & Technology	(Philippines) Raffy Mosuela	Michelle Cobb
CAP	Capital1 Solar Spikers	CapitalOne Energy Corp.	(Philippines) Roger Gorayeb	Jorelle Singh
CTC	Chery Tiggo Crossovers	United Asia Automotive Group	(Philippines) Kungfu Reyes	Aby Maraño
CMF	Choco Mucho Flying Titans	Republic Biscuit Corporation	(Philippines) Dante Alinsunurin	Maddie Madayag
CHD	Cignal HD Spikers	Cignal TV, Inc.	(Philippines) Shaq Delos Santos	Frances Molina
CCS	Creamline Cool Smashers	Republic Biscuit Corporation	(Philippines) Sherwin Meneses	Alyssa Valdez
FFF	Farm Fresh Foxies	Farm Fresh Philippine International / Strong Group Athletics	(Philippines) Jerry Yee	Louie Romero
GTH	Galeries Tower Highrisers	Grand Taipan Land Development	(Philippines) Lerma Giron	Dimdim Pacres
NXL	Nxled Chameleons	Akari Lighting & Technology	(Japan) Taka Minowa	Dani Ravena
PGA	PetroGazz Angels	PetroGazz Ventures Phils.	(Japan) Koji Tsuzurabara	Remy Palma
HSH	PLDT High Speed Hitters	PLDT Inc.	(Philippines) Rald Ricafort	Kath Arado
SGA	Strong Group Athletics	Strong Group Athletics	(Philippines) Rogelio Getigan	Dolly Versoza

== Venues ==
Regular venues

Preliminaries	Preliminaries, Semifinals	Preliminaries, Semifinals, Finals
San Juan	Pasig	Quezon City
Filoil EcoOil Centre	PhilSports Arena	Araneta Coliseum
Capacity: 6,000	Capacity: 10,000	Capacity: 20,000

PVL on Tour venues

Preliminaries
Santa Rosa	Antipolo
Santa Rosa Sports Complex	Ynares Center
Capacity: 5,700	Capacity: 7,400

== Transactions ==
=== Team additions and transfers ===
The following are the players who transferred to another team for the upcoming conference.

Player	Moving from	Moving to	Ref.
Celine Domingo	Creamline Cool Smashers	Akari Chargers	
Max Juangco	FEU Lady Tamaraws (UAAP)	Akari Chargers	
Grethcel Soltones	Petro Gazz Angels	Akari Chargers	
Cathrina Dizon	Benilde Lady Blazers (NCAA)	Capital1 Solar Spikers	
Jorelle Singh	Biñan Tatak Gel (MPVA)	Capital1 Solar Spikers	
May Macatuno	Biñan Tatak Gel (MPVA)	Capital1 Solar Spikers	
Arianne Mae Layug	Cignal HD Spikers	Capital1 Solar Spikers	
Bingle Landicho	Chery Tiggo Crossovers	Capital1 Solar Spikers	
Rovena Andrea Instrella	F2 Logistics Cargo Movers	Capital1 Solar Spikers	
Renesa Melgar	Galeries Tower Highrisers	Capital1 Solar Spikers	
Sydney Mae Niegos	Marikina Lady Shoemasters (MPVA)	Capital1 Solar Spikers	
Rica Jane Rivera	Nasipit Lady Spikers (MPVA)	Capital1 Solar Spikers	
Janine Navarro	Nxled Chameleons	Capital1 Solar Spikers	
Heather Anne Guino-o	Petro Gazz Angels	Capital1 Solar Spikers	
Ma. Lourdes Clemente	Petro Gazz Angels	Capital1 Solar Spikers	
Katherine Villegas	PLDT Home Fibr Power Hitters	Capital1 Solar Spikers	
Shyra Mae Umandal	Quezon City Gerflor Defenders	Capital1 Solar Spikers	
Aiko Sweet Urdas	United Auctioneers Army	Capital1 Solar Spikers	
Janine Lana	UE Lady Red Warriors (UAAP)	Capital1 Solar Spikers	
Jhudelle Quizon	UE Lady Red Warriors (UAAP)	Capital1 Solar Spikers	
Abigail Maraño	F2 Logistics Cargo Movers	Chery Tiggo Crossovers	
Victonara Galang	F2 Logistics Cargo Movers	Chery Tiggo Crossovers	
Jeanette Virginia Villareal	Quezon City Gerflor Defenders	Chery Tiggo Crossovers	
Dawn Macandili-Catindig	F2 Logistics Cargo Movers	Cignal HD Spikers	
Jovelyn Fernandez	F2 Logistics Cargo Movers	Cignal HD Spikers	
Bia Fatima General	Cignal HD Spikers	Choco Mucho Flying Titans	
Marionne Angelique Alba	F2 Logistics Cargo Movers	Choco Mucho Flying Titans	
Mean Mendrez	PLDT High Speed Hitters	Choco Mucho Flying Titans	
Royse Tubino	PLDT High Speed Hitters	Choco Mucho Flying Titans	
Bea De Leon	Choco Mucho Flying Titans	Creamline Cool Smashers	
Denden Lazaro-Revilla	Choco Mucho Flying Titans	Creamline Cool Smashers	
Dij Rodriguez	Creamline Beach Volleyball (Beach Volleyball)	Creamline Cool Smashers	
Lorene Toring	Adamson Lady Falcons (UAAP)	Farm Fresh Foxies	
Jaycel Delos Reyes	Chery Tiggo Crossovers	Farm Fresh Foxies	
Caitlin Viray	Choco Mucho Flying Titans	Farm Fresh Foxies	
Chinnie Pia Arroyo	F2 Logistics Cargo Movers	Farm Fresh Foxies	
Elaine Kasilag	F2 Logistics Cargo Movers	Farm Fresh Foxies	
Jolina Dela Cruz	F2 Logistics Cargo Movers	Farm Fresh Foxies	
Julia Angeles	Galeries Tower Highrisers	Farm Fresh Foxies	
Janel Delerio	Nasipit Lady Spikers (MPVA)	Farm Fresh Foxies	
Angelica Legacion	PLDT High Speed Hitters	Farm Fresh Foxies	
Ypril Tapia	San Juan Lady Knights (MPVA)	Farm Fresh Foxies	
Shola Alvarez	F2 Logistics Cargo Movers	Galeries Tower Highrisers	
France Ronquillo	Chery Tiggo Crossovers	Galeries Tower Highrisers	
Alyssa Eroa	Marikina Lady Shoemasters (MPVA)	Galeries Tower Highrisers	
Renee Mabilangan	NU Lady Bulldogs (UAAP)	Galeries Tower Highrisers	
Jaila Atienza	Chery Tiggo Crossovers	Nxled Chameleons	
Ivy Lacsina	F2 Logistics Cargo Movers	Nxled Chameleons	
Brooke Van Sickle	AEL Limassol (Cyprus)	Petro Gazz Angels	
Ethan Laine Arce	F2 Logistics Cargo Movers	Petro Gazz Angels	
Mary Joy Dacoron	F2 Logistics Cargo Movers	Petro Gazz Angels	
Myla Pablo	F2 Logistics Cargo Movers	Petro Gazz Angels	
Michelle Morente	PLDT High Speed Hitters	Petro Gazz Angels	
MJ Phillips	Gwangju AI Peppers (South Korea)	Petro Gazz Angels	
Kim Fajardo	F2 Logistics Cargo Movers	PLDT High Speed Hitters	
Kim Kianna Dy	F2 Logistics Cargo Movers	PLDT High Speed Hitters	
Mary Joy Baron	F2 Logistics Cargo Movers	PLDT High Speed Hitters	
Sheila Kiseo	FEU Lady Tamaraws (UAAP)	PLDT High Speed Hitters	
Kiesha Dazzie Bedonia	FEU Lady Tamaraws (UAAP)	PLDT High Speed Hitters	
Angelica Dacaymat	Marikina Lady Shoemasters (MPVA)	Strong Group Athletics	
Ayumi Furukawa	Ateneo Blue Eagles (UAAP)	Strong Group Athletics	
Chumcee Ann Caole	Nasipit Lady Spikers (MPVA)	Strong Group Athletics	
Dolly Verzosa	JRU Lady Bombers (NCAA)	Strong Group Athletics	
Grenlen Malapit	Marikina Lady Shoemasters (MPVA)	Strong Group Athletics	
Jan Angeli Cane	Ateneo Blue Eagles (UAAP)	Strong Group Athletics	
Jana Sta. Maria	Nasipit Lady Spikers (MPVA)	Strong Group Athletics	
Javen Sabas	Kurashiki Ablaze (Japan)	Strong Group Athletics	
Jean Arianne May Licauco	Ateneo Blue Eagles (UAAP)	Strong Group Athletics	
Justin Andrea Rebleza	Marikina Lady Shoemasters (MPVA)	Strong Group Athletics	
Lilet Mabbayad	San Juan Lady Knights (MPVA)	Strong Group Athletics	
Mary Joy Onofre	Marikina Lady Shoemasters (MPVA)	Strong Group Athletics	
Melanie Romero	Marikina Lady Shoemasters (MPVA)	Strong Group Athletics	
Merry Rose Jauculan	UST Golden Tigresses (UAAP)	Strong Group Athletics	
Nikkie Baldizanso	UP Fighting Maroons (UAAP)	Strong Group Athletics	
Noheli Cerdeña	Nasipit Lady Spikers (MPVA)	Strong Group Athletics	
Sarah Princess Verutiao	Quezon City Gerflor Defenders	Strong Group Athletics	
Sheeka Espinosa	Nasipit Lady Spikers (MPVA)	Strong Group Athletics	
Souzan Raslan	Marinerang Pilipina Lady Skippers (PSL)	Strong Group Athletics	
Valiza Grace Fornilos	Ateneo Blue Eagles (UAAP)	Strong Group Athletics	
Vira May Guillema	Marikina Lady Shoemasters (MPVA)	Strong Group Athletics	

=== Coaching changes ===
Team	Outgoing coach	Manner of departure	Replaced by	Ref
Akari Chargers	(Brazil) Jorge Edson	Resigned	(Philippines) Raffy Monsuela	
Chery Tiggo Crossovers	(Philippines) Aaron Velez	Reassigned	(Philippines) Emilio Reyes Jr.	
Petro Gazz Angels	(Philippines) Timmy Santo Tomas	Replaced	(Japan) Koji Tsuzurabara	

== Format ==
Preliminary Round

1. The twelve teams will compete in a single round-robin elimination.
2. Teams are ranked using the FIVB Ranking System.
3. Top four teams will advance to the semifinals.

Semifinals

1. The four teams play again in a single round-robin elimination.
2. Teams are ranked using the FIVB Ranking System.
3. The 3rd and 4th ranked teams are relegated to the bronze medal match.
4. The 1st and 2nd ranked teams are advanced to the gold medal match.
5. In case of a tie at no. 2, a do-or-die match will commence to determine the 2nd ranked team.

Finals

1. Bronze medal: SF Rank 3 vs SF Rank 4 (best-of-three series)
2. Gold medal: SF Rank 1 vs SF Rank 2 (best-of-three series)

== Pool standing procedure ==
- First, teams are ranked by the number of matches won.
- If the number of matches won is tied, the tied teams are then ranked by match points, wherein:
  - Match won 3–0 or 3–1: 3 match points for the winner, 0 match points for the loser.
  - Match won 3–2: 2 match points for the winner, 1 match point for the loser.
- In case of any further ties, the following criteria shall be used:
  - Set ratio: the number of sets won divided by number of sets lost.
  - Point ratio: number of points scored divided by number of points allowed.
  - Head-to-head standings: any remaining tied teams are ranked based on the results of head-to-head matches involving the teams in question.

== Preliminary round ==
- All times are Philippine Standard Time (UTC+8:00).

=== Ranking ===
Pos	Team	Pld	W	L	Pts	SW	SL	SR	SPW	SPL	SPR	Qualification
1	Petro Gazz Angels	11	9	2	28	31	9	3.444	936	779	1.202	Final round
2	Choco Mucho Flying Titans	11	9	2	26	29	11	2.636	921	771	1.195	Final round
3	Chery Tiggo Crossovers	11	9	2	25	28	11	2.545	899	781	1.151	Final round
4	Creamline Cool Smashers	11	8	3	24	27	13	2.077	946	831	1.138	Final round
5	PLDT High Speed Hitters	11	8	3	23	25	12	2.083	859	726	1.183	
6	Cignal HD Spikers	11	7	4	22	23	14	1.643	869	747	1.163	
7	Akari Chargers	11	5	6	15	17	18	0.944	767	750	1.023	
8	Nxled Chameleons	11	4	7	11	14	23	0.609	794	824	0.964	
9	Farm Fresh Foxies	11	3	8	11	14	24	0.583	785	863	0.910	
10	Galeries Tower Highrisers	11	3	8	9	11	26	0.423	689	832	0.828	
11	Capital1 Solar Spikers	11	1	10	4	5	31	0.161	631	860	0.734	
12	Strong Group Athletics	11	0	11	0	1	33	0.030	532	844	0.630	

Source: TeamPilipinas.info

=== Match results ===
Date	Time	Venue		Score		Set 1	Set 2	Set 3	Set 4	Set 5	Total	Report
Feb 20	16:00	PSA	Petro Gazz Angels	3–0	Strong Group Athletics	25–12	25–20	25–12			75–44	P2
Feb 20	18:00	PSA	Chery Tiggo Crossovers	3–0	Capital1 Solar Spikers	25–6	25–15	25–15			75–36	P2
Feb 22	15:00	FEC	Galeries Tower Highrisers	0–3	PLDT High Speed Hitters	22–25	6–25	9–25			37–75	P2
Feb 22	17:00	FEC	Nxled Chameleons	0–3	Choco Mucho Flying Titans	12–25	22–25	18–25			52–75	P2
Feb 24	14:00	SAC	Strong Group Athletics	0–3	Chery Tiggo Crossovers	12–25	17–25	19–25			48–75	P2
Feb 24	16:00	SAC	Akari Chargers	1–3	Cignal HD Spikers	25–21	18–25	12–25	18–25		73–96	P2
Feb 24	18:00	SAC	Farm Fresh Foxies	1–3	Creamline Cool Smashers	36–34	23–25	22–25	15–25		96–109	P2
Feb 27	16:00	PSA	PLDT High Speed Hitters	3–0	Nxled Chameleons	25–17	25–23	25–22			75–62	P2
Feb 27	18:00	PSA	Choco Mucho Flying Titans	3–2	Petro Gazz Angels	24–26	25–22	25–18	24–26	15–13	113–105	P2
Feb 29	16:00	PSA	Capital1 Solar Spikers	0–3	Farm Fresh Foxies	16–25	18–25	16–25			50–75	P2
Feb 29	18:00	PSA	Creamline Cool Smashers	3–1	Akari Chargers	25–22	21–25	25–22	25–19		96–88	P2
Mar 2	14:00	PSA	Cignal HD Spikers	3–0	Galeries Tower Highrisers	25–14	25–16	25–17			75–47	P2
Mar 2	16:00	PSA	Petro Gazz Angels	3–0	PLDT High Speed Hitters	25–16	25–23	25–21			75–60	P2
Mar 2	18:00	PSA	Chery Tiggo Crossovers	1–3	Choco Mucho Flying Titans	9–25	23–25	25–20	17–25		74–95	P2
Mar 5	16:00	PSA	Strong Group Athletics	1–3	Capital1 Solar Spikers	18–25	20–25	25–19	20–25		83–94	P2
Mar 5	18:00	PSA	Akari Chargers	3–0	Farm Fresh Foxies	25–19	25–15	25–22			75–56	P2
Mar 7	16:00	PSA	Galeries Tower Highrisers	0–3	Creamline Cool Smashers	22–25	17–25	15–25			54–75	P2
Mar 7	18:00	PSA	Nxled Chameleons	0–3	Cignal HD Spikers	21–25	17–25	21–25			59–75	P2
Mar 9	14:00	FEC	PLDT High Speed Hitters	3–0	Capital1 Solar Spikers	25–13	25–15	25–16			75–44	P2
Mar 9	16:00	FEC	Petro Gazz Angels	3–0	Akari Chargers	25–21	25–23	25–17			75–61	P2
Mar 9	18:00	FEC	Chery Tiggo Crossovers	0–3	Farm Fresh Foxies	23–25	22–25	16–25			61–75	P2
Mar 12	16:00	PSA	Strong Group Athletics	0–3	Creamline Cool Smashers	13–25	13–25	19–25			45–75	P2
Mar 12	18:00	PSA	Nxled Chameleons	3–0	Galeries Tower Highrisers	25–21	25–18	25–15			75–54	P2
Mar 14	16:00	PSA	Farm Fresh Foxies	0–3	Petro Gazz Angels	21–25	25–27	19–25			65–77	P2
Mar 14	18:00	PSA	Choco Mucho Flying Titans	3–0	Cignal HD Spikers	25–18	25–20	25–21			75–59	P2
Mar 16	14:00	SRSC	Creamline Cool Smashers	0–3	Chery Tiggo Crossovers	18–25	24–26	23–25			65–76	P2
Mar 16	16:00	SRSC	Capital1 Solar Spikers	2–3	Galeries Tower Highrisers	25–17	20–25	25–20	19–25	10–15	99–102	P2
Mar 16	18:00	SRSC	Akari Chargers	3–0	Nxled Chameleons	25–17	25–19	25–20			75–56	P2
Mar 19	16:00	FEC	Cignal HD Spikers	3–0	Strong Group Athletics	25–7	25–16	25–16			75–39	P2
Mar 19	18:00	FEC	PLDT High Speed Hitters	3–2	Choco Mucho Flying Titans	25–20	25–12	23–25	11–25	15–13	99–95	P2
Mar 21	16:00	SAC	Creamline Cool Smashers	3–0	Capital1 Solar Spikers	25–18	25–14	25–15			75–47	P2
Mar 21	18:00	SAC	Chery Tiggo Crossovers	3–2	Petro Gazz Angels	25–21	18–25	22–25	25–19	15–13	105–103	P2
Mar 23	14:00	YCA	Galeries Tower Highrisers	3–0	Strong Group Athletics	25–17	25–14	25–12			75–43	P2
Mar 23	16:00	YCA	Farm Fresh Foxies	0–3	PLDT High Speed Hitters	9–25	13–25	21–25			43–75	P2
Mar 23	18:00	YCA	Akari Chargers	0–3	Choco Mucho Flying Titans	17–25	22–25	21–25			60–75	P2
Mar 26	14:00	PSA	Capital1 Solar Spikers	0–3	Petro Gazz Angels	11–25	19–25	14–25			44–75	P2
Mar 26	16:00	PSA	Nxled Chameleons	1–3	Chery Tiggo Crossovers	25–23	23–25	16–25	20–25		84–98	P2
Mar 26	18:00	PSA	Creamline Cool Smashers	3–2	Cignal HD Spikers	26–28	22–25	25–22	25–21	16–14	114–110	P2
Apr 2	16:00	PSA	PLDT High Speed Hitters	3–0	Akari Chargers	25–17	25–20	25–19			75–56	P2
Apr 2	18:00	PSA	Choco Mucho Flying Titans	3–0	Galeries Tower Highrisers	25–13	25–19	25–17			75–49	P2
Apr 4	16:00	PSA	Cignal HD Spikers	3–0	Farm Fresh Foxies	25–10	25–14	25–15			75–39	P2
Apr 4	18:00	PSA	Strong Group Athletics	0–3	Nxled Chameleons	16–25	16–25	15–25			47–75	P2
Apr 6	14:00	SRSC	Galeries Tower Highrisers	0–3	Akari Chargers	19–25	17–25	20–25			56–75	P2
Apr 6	16:00	SRSC	Capital1 Solar Spikers	0–3	Choco Mucho Flying Titans	15–25	16–25	21–25			52–75	P2
Apr 6	18:00	SRSC	Petro Gazz Angels	3–2	Creamline Cool Smashers	15–25	25–18	24–26	25–19	15–13	104–101	P2
Apr 9	16:00	PSA	Nxled Chameleons	3–2	Farm Fresh Foxies	24–26	25–20	25–23	20–25	15–11	109–105	P2
Apr 9	18:00	PSA	Strong Group Athletics	0–3	PLDT High Speed Hitters	12–25	21–25	17–25			50–75	P2
Apr 11	16:00	PSA	Akari Chargers	3–0	Capital1 Solar Spikers	25–17	25–14	25–20			75–51	P2
Apr 11	18:00	PSA	Chery Tiggo Crossovers	3–0	Cignal HD Spikers	26–24	25–20	26–24			77–68	P2
Apr 13	14:00	PSA	Farm Fresh Foxies	0–3	Galeries Tower Highrisers	18–25	23–25	16–25			57–75	P2
Apr 13	16:00	PSA	Choco Mucho Flying Titans	3–0	Strong Group Athletics	25–17	25–15	25–15			75–47	P2
Apr 13	18:00	PSA	Creamline Cool Smashers	3–0	Nxled Chameleons	25–22	25–12	25–20			75–54	P2
Apr 16	16:00	PSA	Cignal HD Spikers	0–3	Petro Gazz Angels	13–25	18–25	17–25			48–75	P2
Apr 16	18:00	PSA	PLDT High Speed Hitters	0–3	Chery Tiggo Crossovers	22–25	16–25	20–25			58–75	P2
Apr 18	16:00	SAC	Farm Fresh Foxies	3–0	Strong Group Athletics	25–10	25–15	25–22			75–47	P2
Apr 18	18:00	SAC	Creamline Cool Smashers	3–0	Choco Mucho Flying Titans	25–17	25–22	25–19			75–58	P2
Apr 20	14:00	SRSC	Galeries Tower Highrisers	0–3	Petro Gazz Angels	7–25	21–25	17–25			45–75	P2
Apr 20	16:00	SRSC	Akari Chargers	0–3	Chery Tiggo Crossovers	17–25	20–25	17–25			54–75	P2
Apr 20	18:00	SRSC	Cignal HD Spikers	3–1	PLDT High Speed Hitters	24–26	26–24	25–17	28–26		103–93	P2
Apr 23	16:00	PSA	Nxled Chameleons	3–0	Capital1 Solar Spikers	25–13	25–23	25–22			75–58	P2
Apr 23	18:00	PSA	Choco Mucho Flying Titans	3–2	Farm Fresh Foxies	25–15	24–26	21–25	25–21	15–12	110–99	P2
Apr 25	16:00	PSA	Chery Tiggo Crossovers	3–2	Galeries Tower Highrisers	26–24	23–25	19–25	25–12	15–9	108–95	P2
Apr 25	18:00	PSA	PLDT High Speed Hitters	3–1	Creamline Cool Smashers	22–25	25–14	25–22	27–25		99–86	P2
Apr 27	14:00	PSA	Capital1 Solar Spikers	0–3	Cignal HD Spikers	19–25	17–25	20–25			56–75	P2
Apr 27	16:00	PSA	Petro Gazz Angels	3–1	Nxled Chameleons	22–25	25–23	25–23	25–22		97–93	P2
Apr 27	18:00	PSA	Strong Group Athletics	0–3	Akari Chargers	8–25	15–25	16–25			39–75	P2

== Final round ==
- All times are Philippine Standard Time (UTC+8:00).

=== Semifinals ===
==== Ranking ====
Pos	Team	Pld	W	L	Pts	SW	SL	SR	SPW	SPL	SPR	Qualification
1	Choco Mucho Flying Titans	3	3	0	8	9	3	3.000	274	257	1.066	Championship
2	Creamline Cool Smashers	3	2	1	7	8	4	2.000	285	256	1.113	Championship
3	Petro Gazz Angels	3	1	2	3	5	7	0.714	282	279	1.011	3rd place
4	Chery Tiggo Crossovers	3	0	3	0	1	9	0.111	196	245	0.800	3rd place

Source: TeamPilipinas.info

==== Match results ====
Date	Time	Venue		Score		Set 1	Set 2	Set 3	Set 4	Set 5	Total	Report
Apr 30	16:00	PSA	Creamline Cool Smashers	2–3	Choco Mucho Flying Titans	25–13	25–19	21–25	20–25	16–18	107–100	P2
Apr 30	18:00	PSA	Chery Tiggo Crossovers	1–3	Petro Gazz Angels	25–20	21–25	15–25	16–25		77–95	P2
May 2	16:00	PSA	Petro Gazz Angels	1–3	Creamline Cool Smashers	25–27	25–23	25–27	24–26		99–103	P2
May 2	18:00	PSA	Chery Tiggo Crossovers	0–3	Choco Mucho Flying Titans	20–25	19–25	23–25			62–75	P2
May 5	16:00	SAC	Creamline Cool Smashers	3–0	Chery Tiggo Crossovers	25–16	25–21	25–20			75–57	P2
May 5	18:00	SAC	Choco Mucho Flying Titans	3–1	Petro Gazz Angels	23–25	26–24	25–19	25–20		99–88	P2

=== Finals ===
==== 3rd place ====
- Petro Gazz wins series, 1–1, via points ratio of 1.126 vs. 0.888

Date	Time	Venue		Score		Set 1	Set 2	Set 3	Set 4	Set 5	Total	Report
May 9	16:00	SAC	Chery Tiggo Crossovers	2–3	Petro Gazz Angels	25–22	12–25	18–25	29–27	12–15	96–114	P2
May 12	16:00	SAC	Petro Gazz Angels	2–3	Chery Tiggo Crossovers	25–16	25–11	13–25	22–25	16–18	101–95	P2

==== Championship ====
- Creamline wins series, 2–0

Date	Time	Venue		Score		Set 1	Set 2	Set 3	Set 4	Set 5	Total	Report
May 9	18:00	SAC	Creamline Cool Smashers	3–1	Choco Mucho Flying Titans	24–26	25–20	25–21	25–16		99–83	P2
May 12	18:00	SAC	Choco Mucho Flying Titans	2–3	Creamline Cool Smashers	25–20	20–25	25–22	22–25	11–15	103–107	P2

== Final standing ==
Rank	Team
1st place, gold medalist(s)	Creamline Cool Smashers
2nd place, silver medalist(s)	Choco Mucho Flying Titans
3rd place, bronze medalist(s)	Petro Gazz Angels
4	Chery Tiggo Crossovers
5	PLDT High Speed Hitters
6	Cignal HD Spikers
7	Akari Chargers
8	Nxled Chameleons
9	Farm Fresh Foxies
10	Galeries Tower Highrisers
11	Capital1 Solar Spikers
12	Strong Group Athletics

2024 PVL All-Filipino champions
Creamline Cool Smashers
Eighth title

Team roster
Alyssa Valdez (c), Kyle Negrito, Floremel Rodriguez, Risa Sato, Jeanette Panaga, Michele Gumabao, Jorella Marie De Jesus, Lorielyn Bernardo, Maria Paulina Soriano, Kyla Atienza, Dennise Michelle Lazaro-Revilla, Isabel Beatriz de Leon, Theo Bea Bonafe, Rizza Jane Mandapat, Rosemarie Vargas, Jessica Margarett Galanza, Bernadeth Pons, Maria Fe Galanza, Diana Mae Carlos
Head coach
Sherwin Meneses

== Awards and medalists ==
=== Awards ===
Individual awards

Starting from this conference, the league no longer ranks the two Best Outside Spikers and Best Middle Blockers as first and second. Instead, the two recipients are both considered Best Outside Spikers or Best Middle Blockers.

Award	Player	Team	Ref.
Conference Most Valuable Player	Brooke Van Sickle	Petro Gazz	
Finals Most Valuable Player	Jema Galanza	Creamline	
Best Outside Spikers	Jema Galanza	Creamline	
Best Outside Spikers	Sisi Rondina	Choco Mucho	
Best Middle Blockers	Maddie Madayag	Choco Mucho	
Best Middle Blockers	Jeanette Panaga	Creamline	
Best Opposite Spiker	Aiza Maizo-Pontillas	Petro Gazz	
Best Setter	Kyle Negrito	Creamline	
Best Libero	Thang Ponce	Choco Mucho	

Special award

Award	Team	Ref.
Fair Play	Nxled Chameleons	

=== Medalists ===
Gold	Silver	Bronze
Creamline Cool Smashers: Alyssa Valdez (c); Kyle Negrito; Floremel Rodriguez; Risa Sato; Jeanette Panaga; Michele Gumabao; Ella de Jesus; Lorie Bernardo; Pau Soriano; Kyla Atienza; Denden Lazaro-Revilla; Bea De Leon; Theo Bea Bonafe; Rizza Mandapat; Rosemarie Vargas; Jema Galanza; Bernadeth Pons; Maria Fe Galanza; Diana Mae Carlos	Choco Mucho Flying Titans: Maddie Madayag (c); Isa Molde; Deanna Wong; Mean Mendrez; Bia General; Caitlin Viray; Maika Ortiz; Marionne Alba; Kat Tolentino; Aduke Ogunsanya; Jamenea Ferrer; Royse Tubino; Thang Ponce; Sisi Rondina; Regine Arocha; Cherry Nunag	Petro Gazz Angels: Remy Palma(c); Lourdes Clemente; Djanel Cheng; Ivy Jisel Perez; Mary Joy Dacoron; Ethan Arce; Jellie Tempiatura; Aiza Maizo-Pontillas; Brooke Van Sickle; Marian Buitre; Kecelyn Galdones; MJ Phillips; Michelle Morente; Myla Pablo; Chie Saet; Marite Espina; Nicole Tiamzon; Jonah Sabete; Babylove Barbon
Head coach: Sherwin Meneses	Head coach: Dante Alinsunurin	Head coach: Koji Tsuzurabara

== Statistics leaders ==
Statistics leaders correct at the end of the preliminary round.

Best Scorers
Rank	Name	Points
1	Brooke Van Sickle	229
2	Cherry Ann Rondina	217
3	Savi Davison	207
4	Tots Carlos	193
5	Jonah Sabete	156

Best Spikers
Rank	Name	%Eff
1	Diana Mae Carlos	41.36
2	Jonah Sabete	39.13
3	Brooke Van Sickle	37.68
4	Savi Davison	36.47
5	Cherry Ann Rondina	35.08

Best Blockers
Rank	Name	Avg
1	Mereophe Sharma	0.74
2	Camille Victoria	0.62
3	Jeanette Panaga	0.58
4	Brooke Van Sickle	0.55
5	Ejiya Laure	0.51

Best Servers
Rank	Name	Avg
1	Brooke Van Sickle	0.48
2	Lycha Ebon	0.38
3	Angelica Cayuna	0.32
4	Jeanette Panaga	0.30
4	Frances Molina	0.30

Best Diggers
Rank	Name	Avg
1	Alyssa Eroa	5.41
2	Dawn Macandili-Catindig	5.19
3	Toni Rose Ponce	5.00
4	Kath Arado	4.95
5	Jennifer Nierva	3.56

Best Setters
Rank	Name	Avg
1	Gel Cayuna	5.38
2	Kyle Negrito	4.58
3	Kim Fajardo	4.24
4	Louie Romero	4.16
5	Marionne Angelique Alba	3.50

Best Receivers
Rank	Name	%Succ
1	Dawn Macandili-Catindig	48.04
2	Baby Love Barbon	45.02
3	Grethcel Soltones	44.28
4	Janel Delerio	39.52
5	Brooke Van Sickle	38.33

== PVLPC player of the week ==
Week	Player	Team	Ref.
February 20–24	Vanie Gandler	Cignal HD Spikers	
February 27–March 2	Sisi Rondina	Choco Mucho Flying Titans	
March 5–9	Louie Romero	Farm Fresh Foxies	
March 12–16	Jennifer Nierva	Chery Tiggo Crossovers	
March 19–23	Savi Davison	PLDT High Speed Hitters	
March 26	Diana Mae Carlos	Creamline Cool Smashers	
April 2–6	Brooke Van Sickle	Petro Gazz Angels	
April 9–13	Eya Laure	Chery Tiggo Crossovers	
April 16–20	Eya Laure	Chery Tiggo Crossovers	
April 23–27	Savi Davison	PLDT High Speed Hitters	
April 30–May 5	Sisi Rondina	Choco Mucho Flying Titans	

== See also ==
- 2024 Spikers' Turf Open Conference
