= 2025 Premier Volleyball League on Tour =

Pre-season conference of the 2025–26 PVL season

- Duration: June 22 – August 17, 2025
- Teams: 12
- Matches: 42
- TV partner(s): One Sports; One Sports+; RPTV
- Streaming partner(s): Pilipinas Live

Results
- Champions: PLDT High Speed Hitters
- Runners-up: Chery Tiggo Crossovers
- Third place: Creamline Cool Smashers
- Fourth place: Cignal HD Spikers

Awards
- Conference MVP: Erika Santos
- Finals MVP: Mika Reyes
- Best OH: Alyssa Valdez; Myla Pablo
- Best MB: Jeanette Panaga; Majoy Baron
- Best OPP: Trisha Tubu
- Best Setter: Kyle Negrito
- Best Libero: Kath Arado

PVL on Tour chronology
- < 2017 (exhibition series) 2026 >

PVL conference chronology
- < 2024–25 All-Filipino 2025 Invitational >

The 2025 Premier Volleyball League on Tour was the preseason tournament of the 2025–26 Premier Volleyball League season. The preseason tournament was originally scheduled in July 2025 but was later moved to June 22, 2025. An Invitational Conference with four local teams as well as foreign guest teams is planned as the final leg of the PVL on Tour.

It was the first time the "PVL on Tour" held as its own tournament. Previously, it was used as a label to market games outside Metro Manila. The previous PVL on Tour was integrated within the 2024–25 All Filipino Conference calendar.

PVL president Ricky Palou announced that the PVL would hold a pre-season tournament, supporting the national team's preparation for the upcoming tournaments including the Southeast Asian Games in Thailand. Some of the games had a greater focus on venues outside Metro Manila.

== Draft ==
The second PVL Rookie Draft was conducted before the start of this conference. The application for the Rookie Draft ended on May 23, 2025, and the draft event was held on June 8, 2025.

== Participating teams ==
2025 Premier Volleyball League on Tour
Abbr.	Team	Affiliation	Head coach	Team captain
AKA	Akari Chargers	Akari Lighting & Technology	(Philippines) Tina Salak	Justine Jazareno
CAP	Capital1 Solar Spikers	CapitalOne Energy Corp.	(Brazil) Jorge de Brito	Roma Mae Doromal
CTC	Chery Tiggo Crossovers	United Asia Automotive Group	(Philippines) Norman Miguel	Aby Maraño
CMF	Choco Mucho Flying Titans	Republic Biscuit Corporation	(Philippines) Dante Alinsunurin	Desiree Cheng
CHD	Cignal HD Spikers	Cignal TV, Inc.	(Philippines) Shaq Delos Santos	Dawn Macandili-Catindig
CCS	Creamline Cool Smashers	Republic Biscuit Corporation	(Philippines) Sherwin Meneses	Alyssa Valdez
FFF	Farm Fresh Foxies	Farm Fresh Philippine International / Strong Group Athletics	(Italy) Alessandro Lodi	Louie Romero
GTH	Galeries Tower Highrisers	Grand Taipan Land Development	(Philippines) Lerma Giron	Roselle Baliton
NXL	Nxled Chameleons	Akari Lighting & Technology	(Italy) Ettore Guidetti	Chiara Permentilla
PGA	Petro Gazz Angels	PetroGazz Ventures Phils.	(Philippines) Brian Esquibel	Remy Palma
HSH	PLDT High Speed Hitters	PLDT Inc.	(Philippines) Rald Ricafort	Kath Arado
ZUS	Zus Coffee Thunderbelles	Zuspresso Sdn. Bhd. / Strong Group Athletics	(Philippines) Jerry Yee	Cloanne Mondoñedo

== Pools composition ==
The teams are grouped into two pools using the serpentine system with the 2024–25 All-Filipino Conference final standings as the basis. However, as in previous conferences, the league ensures that sister teams are not drawn into the same pool. Hence, Cignal and Farm Fresh, which should have been in Pools A and B, respectively, were switched, as this would put them against their sister teams — PLDT and Zus Coffee, in the same pool.

Pool A	Pool B
Petro Gazz Angels (1)	Creamline Cool Smashers (2)
Choco Mucho Flying Titans (4)	Akari Chargers (3)
PLDT High Speed Hitters (5)	Chery Tiggo Crossovers (6)
Galeries Tower Highrisers (8)	Zus Coffee Thunderbelles (7)
Farm Fresh Foxies (10)	Cignal HD Spikers (9)
Nxled Chameleons (12)	Capital1 Solar Spikers (11)

== Venues ==
Metro Manila venues

Preliminaries	Knockouts, Quarterfinals	Semifinals	Finals
San Juan	Pasig	Quezon City	Pasay
Filoil Centre (FIL)	PhilSports Arena (PSA)	Smart Araneta Coliseum (SAC)	SM Mall of Asia Arena (MOA)
Capacity: 6,000	Capacity: 10,000	Capacity: 20,000	Capacity: 20,000

Other venues

Preliminaries
Batangas City, Batangas	Candon, Ilocos Sur	Cebu City	Ilagan, Isabela
Batangas City Sports Center (BAT)	Candon City Arena (CCA)	University of San Jose–Recoletos (USJ) (Basak Coliseum)	Capital Arena (ILA)
Capacity: 5,000	Capacity: 8,000	Capacity: 4,000	Capacity: 10,000
Passi, Iloilo	Rodriguez, Rizal	Vigan, Ilocos Sur	
City of Passi Arena (PAS)	Ynares Center II (YC2)	Chavit Coliseum (CHC)	
Capacity: 2,000	Capacity: 8,000	Capacity: 9,000	

Knockouts
Dasmariñas, Cavite
City of Dasmariñas Arena (COD)
Capacity: 5,000

== Transactions ==
=== National team players ===
The following players are part of the Philippines women's national team pool that were training and scheduled to play in several events in the 2025 national team season. They were therefore excluded from the conference.

Team	Player/s	
Akari Chargers	Fifi Sharma	Justine Jazareno
Capital1 Solar Spikers	Bella Belen	Leila Cruz
Chery Tiggo Crossovers	Jen Nierva	—N/a
Choco Mucho Flying Titans	Maddie Madayag	Tia Andaya
Cignal HD Spikers	Dawn Catindig	Vanie Gandler
Creamline Cool Smashers	Jia de Guzman	—N/a
Galeries Tower Highrisers	Julia Coronel	—N/a
Petro Gazz Angels	MJ Phillips	Brooke Van Sickle
PLDT High Speed Hitters	Dell Palomata	Alleiah Malaluan
Zus Coffee Thunderbelles	Thea Gagate	—N/a

=== Team additions and transfers ===
The following are the players who transferred to another team for the upcoming conference.

Player	Moving from	Moving to	Ref.
Theo Bea Bonafe	Creamline Cool Smashers	Akari Chargers	
Marionne Alba	Choco Mucho Flying Titans	Akari Chargers	
Jerrili Malabanan	Cignal HD Spikers	Capital1 Solar Spikers	
Kecelyn Galdones	Petro Gazz Angels	Capital1 Solar Spikers	
Rachel Anne Austero	PLDT High Speed Hitters	Capital1 Solar Spikers	
Nikka Yandoc	Zus Coffee Thunderbelles	Capital1 Solar Spikers	
Ypril Tapia	Zus Coffee Thunderbelles	Capital1 Solar Spikers	
Ayesha Juegos	Adamson Lady Falcons (UAAP)	Choco Mucho Flying Titans	
Pearl Denura	NU Lady Bulldogs (UAAP)	Cignal HD Spikers	
Heather Guino-o	Capital1 Solar Spikers	Cignal HD Spikers	
Tin Tiamzon	F2 Logistics Cargo Movers	Cignal HD Spikers	
Ethan Arce	Petro Gazz Angels	Cignal HD Spikers	
Erika Santos	PLDT High Speed Hitters	Cignal HD Spikers	
Michelle Gamit	Zus Coffee Thunderbelles	Creamline Cool Smashers	
Des Clemente-De Guzman	Capital1 Solar Spikers	Farm Fresh Foxies	
Frances Molina	Cignal HD Spikers	Farm Fresh Foxies	
Marivic Meneses	Cignal HD Spikers	Farm Fresh Foxies	
Ivy Jisel Perez	Nxled Chameleons	Galeries Tower Highrisers	
Lia Pelaga	Nxled Chameleons	Galeries Tower Highrisers	
Marian Tracy Andal	Perpetual Lady Altas (NCAA)	Galeries Tower Highrisers	
Jovelyn Fernandez	Cignal HD Spikers	Nxled Chameleons	
Janel Delerio	Farm Fresh Foxies	Nxled Chameleons	
Pauline De Guzman	Arellano Lady Chiefs (NCAA)	Petro Gazz Angels	
Bang Pineda	Nxled Chameleons	Petro Gazz Angels	
Maika Ortiz	Choco Mucho Flying Titans	Zus Coffee Thunderbelles	
Alyssa Eroa	Galeries Tower Highrisers	Zus Coffee Thunderbelles	
Renee Mabilangan	Galeries Tower Highrisers	Zus Coffee Thunderbelles	
Fiola Ceballos	PLDT High Speed Hitters	Zus Coffee Thunderbelles	

=== Drafted players ===
The following are the drafted rookie players starting this conference.

	Pick order determined through lottery
Player (in italic text)	Unsigned draftee

Team	1st round		Team	2nd round		3rd round		4th round	
Team	Pick	Player	Team	Pick	Player	Pick	Player	Pick	Player
Capital1 Solar Spikers	1	Bella Belen	Nxled Chameleons	13	Mayang Nuique	passed			
Galeries Tower Highrisers	2	Jean Asis	Capital1 Solar Spikers	14	Pia Abbu	24	Ivy Aquino	passed	
Farm Fresh Foxies	3	Alohi Robins-Hardy	Galeries Tower Highrisers	15	Winnie Bedaña	passed			
Nxled Chameleons	4	Lyann De Guzman	Farm Fresh Foxies	16	Ann Monares	passed			
Zus Coffee Thunderbelles	5	Alexis Miner	Zus Coffee Thunderbelles	17	Mycah Go	25	Riza Nogales	28	Angela Jackson
Cignal HD Spikers	6	Erin Pangilinan	Cignal HD Spikers	18	Jessa Ordiales	passed			
Choco Mucho Flying Titans	7	Tia Andaya	Choco Mucho Flying Titans	19	Kylene Villegas	passed			
Chery Tiggo Crossovers	8	Baby Jyne Soreño	Chery Tiggo Crossovers	20	Erika Deloria	26	Renee Peñafiel	29	Reyann Cañete
PLDT High Speed Hitters	9	Alleiah Malaluan	PLDT High Speed Hitters	21	Zenneth Perolino	passed			
Akari Chargers	10	Chenie Tagaod	Akari Chargers	22	Jamaica Villena	27	Joan Doguna	passed	
Petro Gazz Angels	11	Julyana Tolentino	Petro Gazz Angels	passed		passed			
Creamline Cool Smashers	12	Sheena Toring	Creamline Cool Smashers	23	Nica Celis	passed			

=== Coaching changes ===
Team	Outgoing coach	Manner of departure	Replaced by	Ref.
Akari Chargers	(Japan) Takayuki Minowa	Replaced	(Philippines) Tina Salak	
Capital1 Solar Spikers	(Philippines) Roger Gorayeb	Reassigned	(Brazil) Jorge de Brito	
Farm Fresh Foxies	(Philippines) Benson Bocboc	Replaced	(Italy) Alessandro Lodi	
Petro Gazz Angels	(Japan) Koji Tsuzurabara	Resigned	(Philippines) Brian Esquibel	

== Format ==
The following format will be conducted for the entirety of the pre-season tournament:

Preliminary round

- In the preliminary round, the twelve teams were divided into two pools of six teams each.
- The prelims is a single round-robin tournament, with each team playing one match against all other teams in their pool for a total of five matches. Teams are ranked using the FIVB Ranking System.
- In each pool, the top two teams will directly advance to the quarterfinals while teams ranked third to sixth will play in the crossover knockout round.

Knockout round

- The knockout round will be composed of singular knockout matches, with the winners of each advancing to the quarterfinals.
- The match-ups will be as follows:
  - KO1: Pool A #3 vs. Pool B #6
  - KO2: Pool A #4 vs. Pool B #5
  - KO3: Pool B #3 vs. Pool A #6
  - KO4: Pool B #4 vs. Pool A #5
- The losing teams will be eliminated and be ranked 9th to 12th in the final standings based on their preliminary round results.

Quarterfinals

- The quarterfinals will be composed of singular knockout matches, with the winners of each advancing to the semifinals.
- The eight qualified teams will be seeded based on their preliminary round results.
- The match-ups will be as follows:
  - QF1: #1 vs. #8
  - QF2: #2 vs. #7
  - QF3: #3 vs. #6
  - QF4: #4 vs. #5
- The losing teams will be eliminated and be ranked 5th to 8th in the final standings based on their preliminary round results.

Semifinals

- The semifinals will be composed of singular matches. The winners advance to the championship match while the losers play in the third-place match.
- The match-ups will be as follows:
  - SF1: QF1 winner vs. QF4 winner
  - SF2: QF2 winner vs. QF3 winner

Finals

- Both the championship (gold medal) and third-place (bronze medal) matches will be singular matches.
- The match-ups will be as follows:
  - Championship match: Semifinal round winners
  - Third-place match: Semifinal round losers

Qualification for Invitational Conference

- The four semifinalists will be invited to take part in the 2025 Invitational Conference.

== Pool standing procedure ==
- First, teams are ranked by the number of matches won.
- If the number of matches won is tied, the tied teams are then ranked by match points, wherein:
  - Match won 3–0 or 3–1: 3 match points for the winner, 0 match points for the loser.
  - Match won 3–2: 2 match points for the winner, 1 match point for the loser.
- In case of any further ties, the following criteria shall be used:
  - Set ratio: the number of sets won divided by number of sets lost.
  - Point ratio: number of points scored divided by number of points allowed.
  - Head-to-head standings: any remaining tied teams are ranked based on the results of head-to-head matches involving the teams in question.

== Preliminary round ==
- All times are Philippine Standard Time (UTC+8:00).

=== Pool A ===
Pos	Team	Pld	W	L	Pts	SW	SL	SR	SPW	SPL	SPR	Qualification
1	PLDT High Speed Hitters	5	5	0	15	15	1	15.000	400	298	1.342	Final round
2	Nxled Chameleons	5	4	1	11	12	6	2.000	408	381	1.071	Final round
3	Farm Fresh Foxies	5	3	2	9	9	7	1.286	359	371	0.968	Knockout round
4	Petro Gazz Angels	5	2	3	7	8	10	0.800	390	406	0.961	Knockout round
5	Choco Mucho Flying Titans	5	1	4	3	7	13	0.538	439	481	0.913	Knockout round
6	Galeries Tower Highrisers	5	0	5	0	1	15	0.067	335	386	0.868	Knockout round

Source: PVL.ph

Date	Time	Venue		Score		Set 1	Set 2	Set 3	Set 4	Set 5	Total	Report
Jun 28	16:00	BAT	Galeries Tower Highrisers	1–3	Choco Mucho Flying Titans	19–25	25–13	22–25	20–25		86–88	P2
Jun 28	18:30	BAT	Nxled Chameleons	3–2	Petro Gazz Angels	25–23	19–25	19–25	25–15	15–10	103–98	P2
Jun 29	16:00	BAT	Petro Gazz Angels	3–0	Galeries Tower Highrisers	25–23	25–21	26–24			76–68	P2
Jun 29	18:30	BAT	Choco Mucho Flying Titans	1–3	Nxled Chameleons	20–25	28–26	25–27	22–25		95–103	P2
Jul 01	16:00	FIL	PLDT High Speed Hitters	3–0	Farm Fresh Foxies	25–18	25–21	28–26			78–65	P2
Jul 12	16:00	ILA	Farm Fresh Foxies	3–1	Choco Mucho Flying Titans	23–25	25–19	25–23	26–24		99–91	P2
Jul 12	18:30	ILA	PLDT High Speed Hitters	3–0	Petro Gazz Angels	25–22	25–15	25–16			75–53	P2
Jul 13	16:00	ILA	Petro Gazz Angels	0–3	Farm Fresh Foxies	23–25	21–25	23–25			67–75	P2
Jul 13	18:00	ILA	Choco Mucho Flying Titans	1–3	PLDT High Speed Hitters	22–25	16–25	25–22	17–25		80–97	P2
Jul 15	16:00	FIL	Nxled Chameleons	3–0	Galeries Tower Highrisers	26–24	25–23	25–23			76–70	P2
Jul 26	16:00	USJ	Nxled Chameleons	0–3	PLDT High Speed Hitters	11–25	17–25	21–25			49–75	P2
Jul 26	18:30	USJ	Galeries Tower Highrisers	0–3	Farm Fresh Foxies	25–27	17–25	18–25			60–77	P2
Jul 27	16:00	USJ	PLDT High Speed Hitters	3–0	Galeries Tower Highrisers	25–20	25–14	25–17			75–51	P2
Jul 27	18:30	USJ	Farm Fresh Foxies	0–3	Nxled Chameleons	13–25	16–25	14–25			43–75	P2
Jul 29	18:30	CCA	Choco Mucho Flying Titans	1–3	Petro Gazz Angels	25–20	19–25	24–26	17–25		85–96	P2

=== Pool B ===
Pos	Team	Pld	W	L	Pts	SW	SL	SR	SPW	SPL	SPR	Qualification
1	Cignal HD Spikers	5	4	1	12	13	4	3.250	395	366	1.079	Final round
2	Creamline Cool Smashers	5	3	2	10	11	8	1.375	441	394	1.119	Final round
3	Chery Tiggo Crossovers	5	3	2	9	12	10	1.200	488	451	1.082	Knockout round
4	Zus Coffee Thunderbelles	5	3	2	7	12	12	1.000	512	503	1.018	Knockout round
5	Akari Chargers	5	2	3	6	9	11	0.818	420	460	0.913	Knockout round
6	Capital1 Solar Spikers	5	0	5	1	3	15	0.200	353	432	0.817	Knockout round

Source: PVL.ph

Date	Time	Venue		Score		Set 1	Set 2	Set 3	Set 4	Set 5	Total	Report
Jun 22	16:00	CHC	Akari Chargers	0–3	Cignal HD Spikers	23–25	14–25	23–25			60–75	P2
Jun 22	18:30	CHC	Capital1 Solar Spikers	0–3	Creamline Cool Smashers	10–25	21–25	10–25			41–75	P2
Jun 23	16:00	CHC	Cignal HD Spikers	3–0	Capital1 Solar Spikers	25–21	25–22	25–16			75–59	P2
Jun 23	18:30	CHC	Creamline Cool Smashers	3–1	Akari Chargers	27–25	22–25	25–19	25–18		99–87	P2
Jul 01	18:30	FIL	Cignal HD Spikers	3–0	Creamline Cool Smashers	25–22	25–18	28–26			78–66	P2
Jul 05	16:00	YC2	Chery Tiggo Crossovers	3–1	Capital1 Solar Spikers	20–25	25–23	25–12	28–26		98–86	P2
Jul 05	18:30	YC2	Zus Coffee Thunderbelles	2–3	Akari Chargers	24–26	21–25	25–17	25–17	15–17	110–102	P2
Jul 06	16:00	YC2	Akari Chargers	2–3	Chery Tiggo Crossovers	26–24	19–25	16–25	25–23	10–15	96–112	P2
Jul 06	18:30	YC2	Capital1 Solar Spikers	2–3	Zus Coffee Thunderbelles	25–20	24–26	25–23	18–25	11–15	103–109	P2
Jul 15	18:30	FIL	Akari Chargers	3–0	Capital1 Solar Spikers	25–23	25–18	25–23			75–64	P2
Jul 19	16:00	PAS	Zus Coffee Thunderbelles	3–2	Creamline Cool Smashers	24–26	25–20	25–23	22–25	15–11	111–105	P2
Jul 19	18:30	PAS	Chery Tiggo Crossovers	3–1	Cignal HD Spikers	25–13	26–28	25–15	25–15		101–71	P2
Jul 20	16:00	PAS	Cignal HD Spikers	3–1	Zus Coffee Thunderbelles	25–22	25–17	21–25	25–16		96–80	P2
Jul 20	18:30	PAS	Creamline Cool Smashers	3–1	Chery Tiggo Crossovers	25–21	19–25	25–16	25–18		94–80	P2
Jul 29	16:00	CCA	Chery Tiggo Crossovers	2–3	Zus Coffee Thunderbelles	25–19	22–25	25–18	19–25	6–15	97–102	P2

== Knockout round ==
Teams ranked third to sixth in the preliminary will play in the knockout round.

Date	Time	Venue		Score		Set 1	Set 2	Set 3	Set 4	Set 5	Total	Report
Aug 02	16:00	COD	Farm Fresh Foxies	3–0	Capital1 Solar Spikers	25–20	25–15	25–21			75–56	P2
Aug 02	18:30	COD	Chery Tiggo Crossovers	3–0	Galeries Tower Highrisers	25–23	25–22	25–21			75–66	P2
Aug 05	16:00	PSA	Petro Gazz Angels	0–3	Akari Chargers	30–32	22–25	19–25			71–82	P2
Aug 05	18:30	PSA	Zus Coffee Thunderbelles	3–2	Choco Mucho Flying Titans	22–25	20–25	25–16	25–17	15–10	107–93	P2

== Final round ==
- All times are Philippine Standard Time (UTC+08:00).

=== Bracket ===
Quarterfinals
August 7
1 PLDT	3
8 Zus Coffee	0
August 9
4 Creamline	3
5 Farm Fresh	0
August 7
2 Cignal	3
7 Akari	0
August 9
3 Nxled	0
6 Chery Tiggo	3

Semifinals
August 12
PLDT	3
Creamline	2
August 12
Cignal	1
Chery Tiggo	3

Championship
August 17
PLDT	3
Chery Tiggo	2
3rd place match
August 17
Creamline	3
Cignal	0

=== Match results ===
==== Quarterfinals ====
Date	Time	Venue		Score		Set 1	Set 2	Set 3	Set 4	Set 5	Total	Report
Aug 07	16:00	PSA	Cignal HD Spikers	3–0	Akari Chargers	25–20	25–11	28–26			78–57	P2
Aug 07	18:30	PSA	PLDT High Speed Hitters	3–0	Zus Coffee Thunderbelles	25–21	25–21	25–19			75–61	P2
Aug 09	16:00	PSA	Nxled Chameleons	0–3	Chery Tiggo Crossovers	17–25	15–25	20–25			52–75	P2
Aug 09	18:30	PSA	Creamline Cool Smashers	3–0	Farm Fresh Foxies	25–19	25–19	26–24			76–62	P2

==== Semifinals ====
Date	Time	Venue		Score		Set 1	Set 2	Set 3	Set 4	Set 5	Total	Report
Aug 12	16:00	SAC	Chery Tiggo Crossovers	3–1	Cignal HD Spikers	25–17	16–25	25–21	25–23		91–86	P2
Aug 12	18:30	SAC	Creamline Cool Smashers	2–3	PLDT High Speed Hitters	25–27	25–22	25–19	16–25	10–15	101–108	P2

==== Third place ====
Date	Time	Venue		Score		Set 1	Set 2	Set 3	Set 4	Set 5	Total	Report
Aug 17	16:00	MOA	Creamline Cool Smashers	3–0	Cignal HD Spikers	25–17	29–27	25–17			79–61	P2

==== Championship ====
Date	Time	Venue		Score		Set 1	Set 2	Set 3	Set 4	Set 5	Total	Report
Aug 17	18:30	MOA	PLDT High Speed Hitters	3–2	Chery Tiggo Crossovers	25–17	25–17	19–25	24–26	15–8	108–93	P2

== Final standing ==
Rank	Team
1st place, gold medalist(s)	PLDT High Speed Hitters
2nd place, silver medalist(s)	Chery Tiggo Crossovers
3rd place, bronze medalist(s)	Creamline Cool Smashers
4	Cignal HD Spikers
5	Nxled Chameleons
6	Farm Fresh Foxies
7	Zus Coffee Thunderbelles
8	Akari Chargers
9	Petro Gazz Angels
10	Choco Mucho Flying Titans
11	Capital1 Solar Spikers
12	Galeries Tower Highrisers

Qualified for the 2025 Invitational Conference

2025 PVL on Tour champions
PLDT High Speed Hitters
First title

Team roster
Kath Arado (c), Maria Nieza Viray, Shiela Mae Kiseo, Mika Reyes, Alleiah Jan Lina Malaluan, Savi Davison, Zenneth Irene Perolino, Kim Fajardo, Majoy Baron, Kim Kianna Dy, Dell Palomata, Anne Esguerra, Keisha Dazzie Bedonia, Angelica Legacion, Angelica Alcantara, Jessey Laine de Leon, Jovie Prado
Head coach
Rald Ricafort

== Awards and medalists ==
Individual awards

Award	Player	Team	Ref.
Conference Most Valuable Player	Erika Santos	Cignal	
Finals Most Valuable Player	Mika Reyes	PLDT	
1st Best Outside Spiker	Alyssa Valdez	Creamline	
2nd Best Outside Spiker	Myla Pablo	Petro Gazz	
1st Best Middle Blocker	Jeanette Panaga	Creamline	
2nd Best Middle Blocker	Majoy Baron	PLDT	
Best Opposite Spiker	Trisha Tubu	Farm Fresh	
Best Setter	Kyle Negrito	Creamline	
Best Libero	Kath Arado	PLDT	

=== Medalists ===
Gold	Silver	Bronze
PLDT High Speed Hitters: Kath Arado (c) (L); Maria Nieza Viray (L); Shiela Mae Kiseo; Mika Reyes; Alleiah Jan Lina Malaluan; Savi Davison; Zenneth Irene Perolino; Kim Fajardo; Majoy Baron; Kim Kianna Dy; Dell Palomata; Keisha Dazzie Bedonia; Angelica Legacion; Angelica Alcantara; Jessey Laine de Leon; Jovie Prado	Chery Tiggo Crossovers: Abigail Maraño (c); Princess Robles; Jasmine Nabor; Imee Hernandez; Jules Samonte; Jennifer Nierva (L); Victonara Galang; Alina Bicar; Mary Rhose Dapol; Renee Lou Peñafiel; Karen Verdeflor (L); Cza Carandang; Seth Rodriguez; Joyme Cagande; Baby Jyne Soreño; Erica Jin Deloria; Anngela Nunag; Ponggay Gaston; Shaya Adorador; Reyann Cañete	Creamline Cool Smashers: Alyssa Valdez (c); Kyle Negrito; Michelle Gamit; Sheena Toring; Jeanette Panaga; Michele Gumabao; Ella de Jesus; Lorie Bernardo; Pau Soriano; Kyla Atienza (L); Denden Lazaro-Revilla (L); Bea de Leon; Nica Celis; Rizza Mandapat; Rosemarie Vargas; Tots Carlos; Mafe Galanza; Rhea Dimaculangan; Jema Galanza; Aleiah Torres
Head coach: Rald Ricafort	Head coach: Norman Miguel	Head coach: Sherwin Meneses
