= Maicah Larroza =

Filipino volleyball player

Personal information
- Full name: Princess Maicah Larroza
- Nationality: Filipino
- Born: May 19, 2001 (age 25)
- Home town: Bacolod
- Education: De La Salle University (2021–2024)
- Height: 1.61 m (5 ft 3 in)

Volleyball information
- Position: Outside Hitter, Universal
- Current club: Farm Fresh Foxies
- Number: 10

Career
- Years: Team
- 2024–present: Farm Fresh Foxies

Princess Maicah Larroza (born May 19, 2001) is a Filipino professional volleyball player. She was a champion in both the University Athletic Association of the Philippines (UAAP) high school and collegiate ranks before playing for the Farm Fresh Foxies in the Premier Volleyball League (PVL).

== Early life ==
Growing up with her mother and volleyball coach-father, Larroza attended school in Bacolod City and represented the Negrenses in Western Visayas delegations for volleyball regionally and nationally (Palarong Pambansa).

== Career ==
=== High school ===
Larroza was part of the champion team NU-Nazareth Lady Bullpups in UAAP girls' volleyball.

=== College ===
Larroza won another championship in the collegiate division, popularized by her being a "magic bunot" (sub). It was because her DLSU Lady Spikers needed to win three straight sets and they did with coach Ramil de Jesus' tactical substitution of utilizing her off the bench, erasing the commanding 0–2 lead of the NU Lady Bulldogs and giving La Salle its 12th title in the UAAP women's volleyball on May 16, 2023.

=== Club career ===
Larroza was picked 4th overall by Farm Fresh in the 2024 PVL Draft.

The Foxies defeated the Akari Chargers for their first All-Filipino Conference win behind the heroics of Trisha Tubu, Louie Romero, and Larroza on November 30, 2024.

== Awards ==
=== Collegiate team ===
- UAAP Season 86 volleyball tournaments – bronze, with DLSU Lady Spikers (2024)
- UAAP Season 85 volleyball tournaments – gold, with DLSU Lady Spikers (2023)
- Shakey's Super League Pre-season Championship - gold, with DLSU Lady Spikers (2023)
