= Elaine Kasilag =

Filipina volleyball player (born 1994)

Personal information
- Nickname: Ely Kasilag
- Nationality: Filipino
- Born: August 15, 1994 (age 32)
- Height: 5 ft 11 in (1.80 m)
- Education: De La Salle University-Dasmariñas

Volleyball information
- Position: Opposite hitter
- Number: 15

Elaine Kasilag (born August 15, 1994) is a Filipino professional volleyball player whp last played for the Farm Fresh Foxies of the Premier Volleyball League (PVL).

== Clubs ==
- (Philippines) PLDT Home Ultera Ultra Fast Hitters (2015)
- (Philippines) Pocari Sweat Lady Warriors (2016–2018)
- (Philippines) Pocari-Air Force Lady Jet Spikers (2018)
- (Philippines) Foton Tornadoes/Cherry Tiggo Crossovers (2019–2022)
- (Philippines) F2 Logistics Cargo Movers (2022–2023)
- (Philippines) Farm Fresh Foxies (2024–present)

== Awards ==
=== Clubs ===
Year	League	Conference	Club	Title	Ref
2015	SVL	Open	PLDT Home Ultera Ultra Fast Hitters	Champion	
2015	SVL	Reinforced	PLDT Home Ultera Ultra Fast Hitters	Champion	
2016	SVL	Open	Pocari Sweat Lady Warriors	3rd Place	
2016	SVL	Reinforced	Pocari Sweat Lady Warriors	Champion	
2017	PVL	Reinforced	Pocari Sweat Lady Warriors	Champion	
2017	PVL	Open	Pocari Sweat Lady Warriors	Runner-up	
2021	PVL	Open	Chery Tiggo Crossovers	Champion	
2023	PVL	All-Filipino	F2 Logistics Cargo Movers	3rd Place	
