= Caitlin Viray =

Filipino volleyball player

Personal information
- Nationality: Filipino
- Born: Caitlin Viray; April 12, 1998 (age 28)
- Hometown: Cavite, Philippines
- Height: 5 ft 8 in (1.73 m)
- Education: University of Santo Tomas

Volleyball information
- Position: Opposite hitter
- Current club: Choco Mucho Flying Titans

Career
| Years | Teams |
|---|---|
| 2018 | Smart Giga Hitters |
| 2019 | Marinerang Pilipina Lady Skippers |
| 2020–2024 | Choco Mucho Flying Titans |
| 2024–2025 | Farm Fresh Foxies |
| 2026–present | Choco Mucho Flying Titans |

Caitlin Viray (born April 12, 1998) is a Filipino indoor and beach volleyball player for the Choco Mucho Flying Titans of the Premier Volleyball League (PVL).

== Career ==
=== Collegiate ===
Viray made her first game appearance with the UST Lady Tigresses in the UAAP in UAAP Season 79, where they finished in bronze.

Viray made her first game appearance in beach volleyball in the UAAP Season 80 Beach Volleyball Tournament, where they swept the elimination round with her partner Sisi Rondina and successfully defended their crown. She also won Rookie of the Year. UST Tigresses fails to advance in the Final 4 of UAAP Season 80 women's volleyball tournament.

Her team got a 10–4 win–loss record in the elimination round of UAAP Season 81 women's volleyball tournament, the team's best record since UAAP Season 73. UST Tigresses won over De La Salle Lady Spikers in playoffs and semi-finals and sent UST to its first Finals appearance after 7-year drought.

UAAP Season 82 was supposedly the last playing year of Caitlin Viray for the UST Lady Tigresses, but due to the COVID-19 pandemic, the volleyball schedule was cancelled.

== Clubs ==
- (Philippines) Smart Giga Hitters (2018)
- (Philippines) Marinerang Pilipina Lady Skippers (2019)
- (Philippines) Choco Mucho Flying Titans (2020–2024, 2026–present)
- (Philippines) Farm Fresh Foxies (2024–2025)

== Awards ==
=== Individual ===
| Year | League | Season/Conference | Award | Ref |
|---|---|---|---|---|
| 2017 | UAAP | 79 (beach) | Rookie of the Year | |

=== Collegiate ===
==== UST Golden Tigresses ====
| Year | UAAP Season | Title | Ref |
|---|---|---|---|
| 2017 | 79 (indoor) | 3rd Place | |
| 2018 | 80 (beach) | Champions | |
| 2019 | 81 (indoor) | Runner-up | |

=== Club ===
| Year | League | Tournament | Club | Title | Ref |
|---|---|---|---|---|---|
| 2023 | VTV Cup | | Choco Mucho Flying Titans | 3rd Place | |
| 2023 | PVL | Second All-Filipino | Choco Mucho Flying Titans | Runner-up | |
