= Alohi Robins-Hardy =

Filipino American volleyball player (born 1995)

Personal information
- Full name: Taira Ke'Alohilani Robins-Hardy
- Nickname: Alohi
- Nationality: United States (Note: Sporting nationality – not to be confused with citizenship status. Robins-Hardy is affiliated with USA Volleyball as per the FIVB Player Database. However she was able to play for the Philippine national team in the first leg of the 2019 ASEAN Grand Prix.)
- Born: November 30, 1995 (age 30)
- Hometown: Waimānalo, Hawaii, U.S.
- Height: 6 ft 3 in (191 cm)
- Weight: 180 lb (80 kg)
- Spike: 120 in (300 cm)
- Block: 116 in (295 cm)
- Education: Brigham Young University (2014–2018)

Volleyball information
- Position: Setter
- Current club: Farm Fresh Foxies

Career
Years	Teams
–	ŽOK Spartak Subotica
2019	United VC
2019–2020	Cignal HD Spikers
2022–2023	TFOC
2023–2024	VK Dukla Liberec
2025–present	Farm Fresh Foxies

National team
2019	Philippines
Medal record
Women's volleyball
Representing Philippines
ASEAN Grand Prix
Bronze medal – third place	2019 Nakhon Ratchasima	Team

Taira Ke'Alohilani Robins-Hardy (born November 30, 1995) is a professional Filipino American volleyball player. She is currently a member of the Philippines women's volleyball team and a player of the Farm Fresh Foxies of the Premier Volleyball League.

== Career ==
=== College ===
Robins-Hardy played for the BYU Cougars women's volleyball team from 2014 to 2018.

=== Club ===
==== ŽOK Spartak Subotica ====
Robins-Hardy played for ŽOK Spartak Subotica in the Serbian Super League. She played for two seasons.

==== United VC ====
In early 2019, United Volleyball Club of the Philippine Super Liga (PSL) has signed Robins-Hardy. She was convinced to join the club to increase her chances of being selected for the Philippine national team. Under head coach Joshua Ylaya and Tina Salak, she played for one tournament with United; the 2019 PSL Grand Prix Conference.

==== Cignal HD Spikers ====
Robins-Hardy finished the rest of the 2019 Philippine Super Liga season with the Cignal HD Spikers. Her team finished second at the 2019 All-Filipino Conference where she was also named as Best Setter. Cignal finished third in the 2019 Invitational. The league was disrupted by the COVID-19 pandemic, with Robins-Hardy announcing she would not suit up in the 2021 PVL season. Her issues in obtaining a Philippine passport was also among the reasons for her departure.

==== TFOC ====
After leaving Cignal and the Philippines, Robins-Hardy was signed by French club Terville Florange Olympique Club (TFOC) in 2022 despite having not played competitive volleyball in the past two years. She also played for the club in the CEV Women's Challenge Cup in 2023.

==== VK Dukla Liberec ====
Robins-Hardy played in the Czech Republic, joining VK Dukla Liberec in June 2023.

==== Farm Fresh Foxies ====
In October 2024, the Farm Fresh Foxies of the Premier Volleyball League has signed in Robins-Hardy. However she is unable to play in official league matches due to player eligibility issues. She had to sit out the 2024–25 All-Filipino Conference. She is not considered a free agent and thus cannot play for any team in the tournament.

As someone who has not played a game in the PVL since 2021 she will have to undergo the 2025 draft to be able to formally play for a PVL team. Meanwhile, she remained active with the team under the capacity of assistant coach with Farm Fresh, and the UP Fighting Maroons which like the PVL team is also backed by Strong Group Athletics.

Skipping the draft combine due to personal matters in the United States, Robins-Hardy expressed commitment to play for Farm Fresh and vows to leave the Philippines if another team picks her in the draft. She was warned by the PVL that she "cannot choose teams" and that sanctions may be imposed if it happens. She got picked by Farm Fresh and she was able to make her playing debut for the team at the 2025 PVL on Tour on June 30.

=== National team ===
Robins-Hardy have played for the Philippine national team helping the team win a bronze medal at the first leg of the 2019 ASEAN Grand Prix in Nakhon Ratchasima. However, issues in obtaining a Philippine passport caused her to miss the second leg as well as the 2019 SEA Games.

== Personal life ==
Robins-Hardy hails from Waimānalo, Hawaii. Robins-Hardy is a Filipino American. She studied and played collegiate volleyball for the Brigham Young University. She is the cousin of Gabe Norwood a professional basketball player who plays in the PBA and member of the Philippines men's national basketball team. Her sister, Kawai, also plays volleyball for the Notre Dame de Namur University.

== Clubs ==
- (Serbia) Zok Spartak Subotica (2018–2019)
- (Philippines) United VC (2019)
- (Philippines) Cignal HD Spikers (2019–2020)
- (France) TFOC (2022–2023)
- (Czech Republic) VK Dukla Liberec (2023–2024)
- (Philippines) Farm Fresh Foxies (2025-present)

== Awards ==
=== Individual ===
- 2019 PSL All-Filipino Conference "Best Setter"
- 2024 Czech Cup "Most Valuable Player"

=== National team ===
- 2017 European Global Challenge - Gold medal, with Team USA CNT
- 2019 ASEAN Grand Prix - Nakhon Ratchasima Leg - Bronze medal, with Team Philippines

=== Club Team ===
- 2019 PSL All-Filipino Conference - Silver medal, with Cignal HD Spikers
- 2019 PSL Invitational Conference - Bronze medal, with Cignal HD Spikers
- 2024 Czech Cup - Gold medal, with Volejbalový Klub Dukla Liberec
