= Farm Fresh Foxies =

Filipino women's volleyball team

- 2026–27 Farm Fresh Foxies season
- Short name: Farm Fresh
- Nickname: Foxies
- Founded: 2023
- History: Farm Fresh Foxies; 2023–present
- Owner: Farm Fresh Philippine International Incorporated
- Head coach: Koji Tsuzurabara
- Captain: Alohi Robins-Hardy
- League: Premier Volleyball League
- 2026 Invitational: 5th place

Uniforms
Home	Away

The Farm Fresh Foxies are a women's professional volleyball team in the Philippines competing in the Premier Volleyball League. The team is owned by Farm Fresh Philippine International.

The team made their debut in the 2023 Premier Volleyball League Invitational Conference as an expansion team. It is backed by the Strong Group Athletics organization, which also owns the Zus Coffee Thunderbelles.

== History ==
The Farm Fresh Foxies joined the Premier Volleyball League in 2023. They make their debut in the 2023 Invitational Conference. Jerry Yee is the team's first head coach and an initial roster largely composed of College of Saint Benilde players. They have committed to take part in the league for at least three years.

Its owners meant to use the team's participation the PVL to promote the introduction of Farm Fresh's milk product in the Philippines. The team share ownership with the franchise of Converge FiberXers of the Philippine Basketball Association.

Farm Fresh has not finished higher than sixth place in its first eight regular conferences in two years until it finished as the top team in the second round in the 2025 Reinforced Conference.

== Current roster ==
Farm Fresh Foxies roster
No.	Nat.	Player	Pos.	Height	DOB	From
1	(Philippines) (United States)	Alohi Robins-Hardy (C)	Setter	1.90 m (6 ft 3 in)	November 30, 1995 (age 30)	BYU
2	(Philippines)	Roselyn Doria	Middle Blocker	1.78 m (5 ft 10 in)	September 2, 1996 (age 30)	National-U
3	(Philippines)	Kamille Cal	Setter	1.70 m (5 ft 7 in)	April 25, 2001 (age 25)	National-U
3	(Philippines)	Zenneth Perolino	Middle Blocker	1.82 m (6 ft 0 in)	April 8, 2001 (age 25)	Enderun
4	(Philippines)	Ara Galang	Outside Hitter	1.73 m (5 ft 8 in)	January 4, 1995 (age 31)	De La Salle
5	(Philippines)	Bia General	Libero	1.65 m (5 ft 5 in)	August 27, 1995 (age 31)	National-U
6	(Philippines)	Ethan Arce	Middle Blocker	1.76 m (5 ft 9 in)	June 6, 2001 (age 25)	Philippines
7	(Philippines)	Frances Molina	Outside Hitter	1.80 m (5 ft 11 in)	September 23, 1994 (age 32)	San Beda
8	(Philippines)	Mylene Paat	Opposite Hitter	1.80 m (5 ft 11 in)	April 5, 1994 (age 32)	Adamson
9	(Philippines)	Rizza Cruz	Middle Blocker	1.75 m (5 ft 9 in)	July 8, 2000 (age 26)	Adamson
10	(Philippines)	Maicah Larroza	Libero	1.61 m (5 ft 3 in)	May 19, 2001 (age 25)	De La Salle
11	(Philippines)	Theo Bea Bonafe	Setter	1.73 m (5 ft 8 in)	December 31, 2001 (age 24)	Philippines
12	(Philippines)	Trisha Tubu	Opposite Hitter	1.74 m (5 ft 9 in)	October 24, 2000 (age 25)	Adamson
13	(Philippines)	Jonna Perdido	Outside Hitter	1.75 m (5 ft 9 in)	December 12, 2002 (age 23)	UST
14	(Philippines)	Pierre Abellana	Outside Hitter	1.65 m (5 ft 5 in)	February 26, 2002 (age 24)	UST
15	(Philippines)	Royse Tubino	Outside Hitter	1.75 m (5 ft 9 in)	January 12, 1993 (age 33)	UPHSD
16	(Philippines)	Remy Palma	Middle Blocker	1.77 m (5 ft 10 in)	September 8, 1995 (age 31)	Far Eastern
17	(Philippines)	Louie Romero	Setter	1.60 m (5 ft 3 in)	July 5, 2000 (age 26)	Adamson
18	(Philippines)	Riri Meneses	Middle Blocker	1.85 m (6 ft 1 in)	October 18, 1995 (age 30)	UST
19	(Philippines)	Ela Raagas	Setter	1.70 m (5 ft 7 in)	March 12, 2004 (age 22)	De La Salle
22	(Philippines)	Renee Peñafiel	Outside Hitter	1.64 m (5 ft 5 in)	July 26, 2002 (age 24)	UST
24	(Philippines)	Buding Duremdes	Libero	1.57 m (5 ft 2 in)	June 7, 1998 (age 28)	Far Eastern
Updated as of: October 12, 2026 | Source: PVL.ph

Coaching staff

- Head coach:
  Koji Tsuzurabara
- Assistant coaches:
  Kungfu Reyes
  Robertly Boto
  Zolo Ligot
  Ron Medalla
  Christian Mark Detablan
- Statistician:
  Benson Bocboc
  Darius Francis Udarbe

Team staff

- Team manager:
  Kiara Cruz
- Team coordinator:
  Gizelle Sy

Medical staff

- Physical therapist:
  Christine Magtibay

== Season-by-season records ==
Season	Conference	Preliminary round	Final round	Ranking	Source
2023 (team)	Invitational	6th (0–5, 1 pt) (Pool B)	Did not qualify	13th place	
2023 (team)	Second All-Filipino	10th (2–9, 7 pts)	Did not qualify	10th place	
2024–25 (team)	All-Filipino	9th (3–8, 11 pts)	Did not qualify	9th place	
2024–25 (team)	Reinforced	8th (3–5, 8 pts)	Lost in quarterfinals vs. Akari, 1–3	8th place	
2024–25 (team)	Invitational (Note: Despite not qualifying initially, Farm Fresh accepted the invitation to join the 2024 Invitational Conference.)	5th (0–4, 1 pt)	Did not qualify	5th place	
2024–25 (team)	All-Filipino	6th (5–6, 15 pts)	Did not qualify	10th place	
2025–26 (team)	PVL on Tour	3rd (3–2, 9 pts) (Pool A)	Lost in quarterfinals vs. Creamline, 0–3	6th place	
2025–26 (team)	Invitational	Did not qualify			
2025–26 (team)	Reinforced	1st (7–1, 21 pts)	Lost in quarterfinals vs. Akari, 0–3	5th place	
2025–26 (team)	All-Filipino	4th (5–4, 17 pts)	Lost in qualifying vs. PLDT, 1–3; Won in Play-in final (Pool A) vs. Nxled, 3–0; Finished 4th in semifinals (1–2, 3 pts) Lost in third place match vs. PLDT, 0–2	4th place	
2026–27 (team)	Invitational	5th (1–4, 4 pts)	Won in fifth place match vs. Ho Chi Minh City, 3–0	5th place	

== Individual awards ==
Best Opposite Hitter

Year	Conference	Player	Ref.
2024	Reinforced	Trisha Tubu	
2024–25	All-Filipino	Trisha Tubu	
2025	on Tour	Trisha Tubu	
2025	Reinforced	Trisha Tubu	
2026	All-Filipino	Trisha Tubu	

== Team captains ==
- (Philippines) Cloanne Mondoñedo (2023)
- (Philippines) Louie Romero (2023–2026)
- (Philippines) (United States) Alohi Robins-Hardy (2026–present)

== Former players ==
- AJ Jingco
- Angelica Legacion
- Ann Monares (2025-2026)
- Angelique Dionela
- Cae Jelean Lazo
- Caitlyn Viray (2024-2025)
- Camill Avila
- Chenae Basarte (2023)
- Chinnie Arroyo
- Ckyle Tagsip (2023-2025)
- Cloanne Mondoñedo (2023)
- Elaine Kasilag
- Gayle Pascual (2023)
- Jade Gentapa (2023)
- Janel Delerio
- Jaycel Delos Reyes
- Jessa Dorog (2023)
- Joan Narit
- Jolina Dela Cruz (2024-2026)
- Julia Angeles
- Justine Dorog
- Khate Santiago (2023-2024)
- Lorene Toring (2024-2026)
- Lourdes Clemente-De Guzman
- Michelle Gamit (2023)
- Mycah Go (2023)
- Pia Ildefonso
- Rachel Daquis
- Sarah Jane Gonzales
- Wielyn Estoque (2023)
- Ypril Tapia

== Draft history ==
Season	Pick No.	Name
2024	4	Maicah Larroza
2024	16	Pierre Abellana
2025	3	Alohi Robins-Hardy
2025	16	Ann Monares
2026	6	Jonna Perdido
2026	11	Ela Raagas

== Coaches ==
- (Philippines) Jerry Yee (2023–2024)
- (Japan) Shota Sato (2024)
- (Philippines) Benson Bocboc (2024-25) Interim coach
- (Italy) Alessandro Lodi (2025)
- (Japan) Koji Tsuzurabara (2026–present)

== Imports ==
- (Colombia) Yeny Murillo (2024)
- (Japan) Asaka Tamaru (2024)
- (Belgium) Helene Rousseaux (2025)
