= Ria Meneses =

Filipina volleyball player

Personal information
- Full name: Marivic Velaine Morelos Meneses
- Nickname: Ria, Riri
- Nationality: Filipino
- Born: October 18, 1995 (age 31); Canada
- Height: 1.85 m (6 ft 1 in)
- Weight: 62 kg (137 lb)
- Spike: 285 cm (112 in)
- Block: 280 cm (110 in)
- Education: University of Santo Tomas

Volleyball information
- Position: Middle Blocker
- Current club: Farm Fresh Foxies

Career
Years	Teams
2015	Cagayan Valley Lady Rising Suns
2016–2020	Generika-Ayala Lifesavers
2021	Petro Gazz Angels
2022–2024	Cignal HD Spikers
2025–present	Farm Fresh Foxies

National team
2022–present	Philippines

Marivic Velaine Morelos Meneses (born October 18, 1995), also known as Ria or Riri Meneses, is a Filipino volleyball player for the Farm Fresh Foxies of the Premier Volleyball League (PVL). She was a member of the Philippines women's national under-23 volleyball team which competed in the 2015 Asian Women's U23 Volleyball Championship.

== Clubs ==
- (Philippines) Cagayan Valley Lady Rising Suns (2015)
- (Philippines) Generika-Ayala Lifesavers (2016–2020)
- (Philippines) Petro Gazz Angels (2021)
- (Philippines) Choco Mucho (2021) (Note: National team as club; not to be confused with Choco Mucho Flying Titans)
- (Philippines) Cignal HD Spikers (2022–2025)
- (Philippines) Farm Fresh Foxies (2025–present)

== Awards ==
=== Individual ===
- UAAP Best Blocker – 2015 (Season 77)
- SVL Best Blocker – 2014 First Conference
- SVL 1st Best Middle Blocker (2) – 2015 Open Conference, 2016 Reinforced Open Conference
- PSL 1st Best Middle Blocker – 2018 All-Filipino Conference
- PVL 1st Best Middle Blocker – 2021 Open Conference
- PVL 2nd Best Middle Blocker (2) – 2022 Open Conference, 2023 Second All-Filipino Conference
