= Koji Tsuzurabara =

Japanese volleyball coach

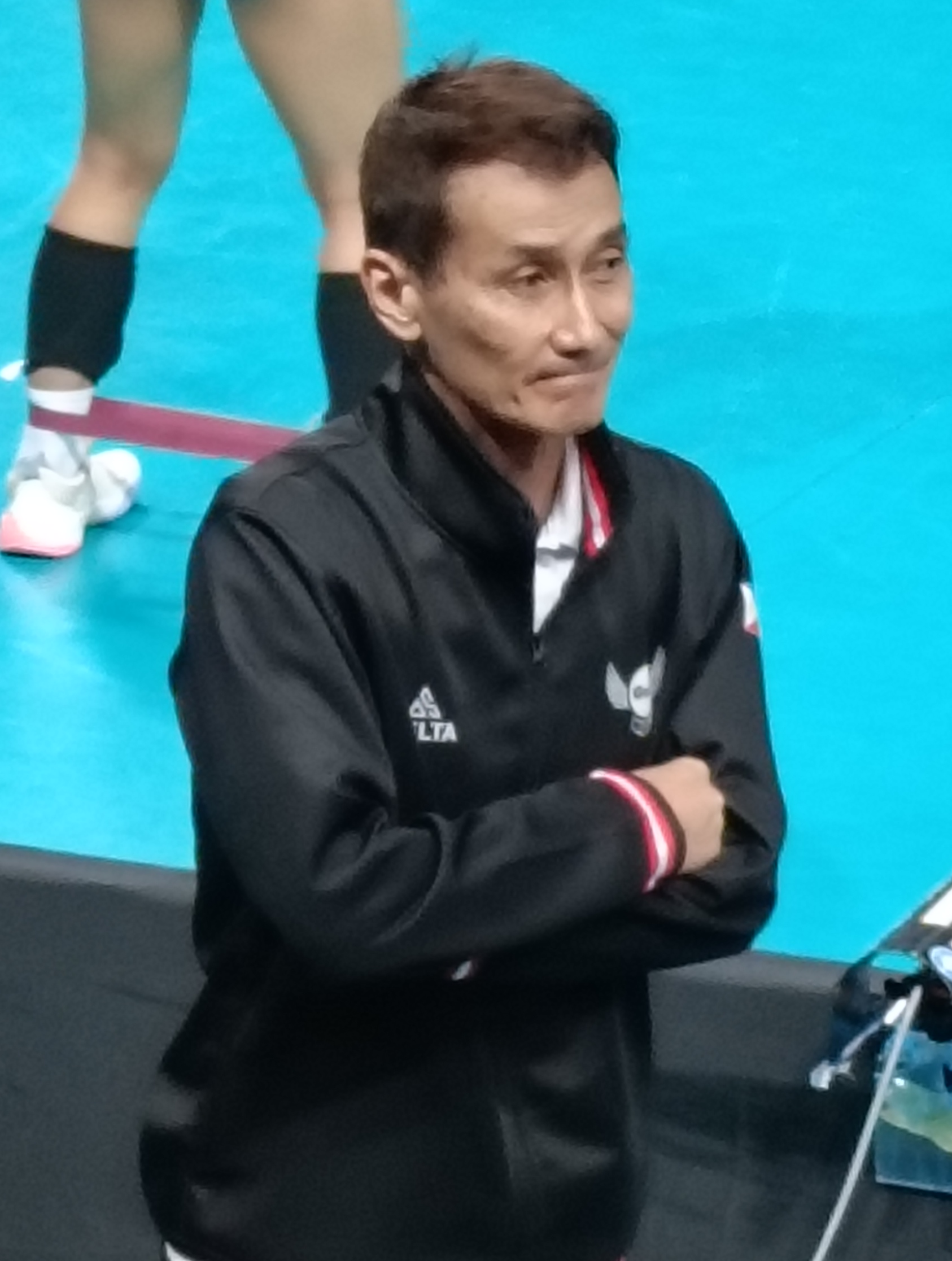
- Tsuzurabara in 2025 with the Petro Gazz Angels

Personal information
- Nationality: Japanese
- Born: Koji Tsuzurabara; 2 October 1964 (age 62)

Coaching information
- Current team: Farm Fresh Foxies
Previous teams coached
Years	Teams
2008–2009; 2019–2022; 2022–2023; 2024–2025; 2025; 2026–	Oita Miyoshi Weisse Adler; Chinese Taipei (women); Kinh Bắc Bắc Ninh; Petro Gazz Angels; SG Hawks; Farm Fresh Foxies

Koji Tsuzurabara (黒葛原 浩二, Tsuzurabara Koji; 2 October 1964) is a Japanese volleyball coach who is the head coach of the Philippine women's club Farm Fresh Foxies of the Premier Volleyball League since 2026.

== Career ==
=== Early years ===
Tsuzurabara was a Hitachi Musashi women's team assistant coach under Olympic coach Shigeo Yamada. From 1997 to 2008, Tsuzurabara has coached for various teams in the Asia-Pacific region; he was coach of Saudi Arabian club Al-Hedayah and New Zealand club Hamilton as well as the national teams of Burma, Malaysia, and Thailand's under-20 and under-21 programs.

In 2008, Tsuzurabara became coach of the Oita Miyoshi Weisse Adler of the V.Premier League in Japan.

=== Chinese Taipei ===
From 2019 to 2022, Tsuzurabara was head coach of the Chinese Taipei women's national team. He led the squad which took part at the 2019 FIVB Women's Volleyball Challenger Cup in Peru and the 2022 Asian Women's Volleyball Cup in the Philippines. He also mentored the Chinese Taipei youth team which played in the 2019 Asian Women's U23 Volleyball Championship in Vietnam.

=== Kinh Bắc Bắc Ninh ===
Tsuzurabara coached the under-19 team of Vietnamese club, Kinh Bắc Bắc Ninh which played as a guest team in the Philippine Premier Volleyball League's (PVL) 2024 Invitational Conference.

=== Petro Gazz Angels ===
Tsuzurabara remained in the PVL after regular league club Petro Gazz Angels hired him in January 2024 ahead of the 2024 All-Filipino Conference. He helped the team win the 2024 PNVF Champions League and the 2024–25 All-Filipino Conference title which is also the club's first-ever All-Filipino title.

In July 2025, Tsuzurabara announced his resignation from Petro Gazz citing two "mistakes" and advised the club not to hire foreign coaches.

=== SG Hawks ===
Tsuzurabara was set to join the SG Hawks of the Mongolian Premier League on September 1, 2025.

=== Farm Fresh Foxies ===
In January 2026, Tsuzurabara returned to the PVL to coach the Farm Fresh Foxies.

== Honours ==
Petro Gazz:

- 1 Premier Volleyball League: 2024–25 All-Filipino
- 1 PNVF for Women: 2024
