= Lorene Toring =

Filipino volleyball player

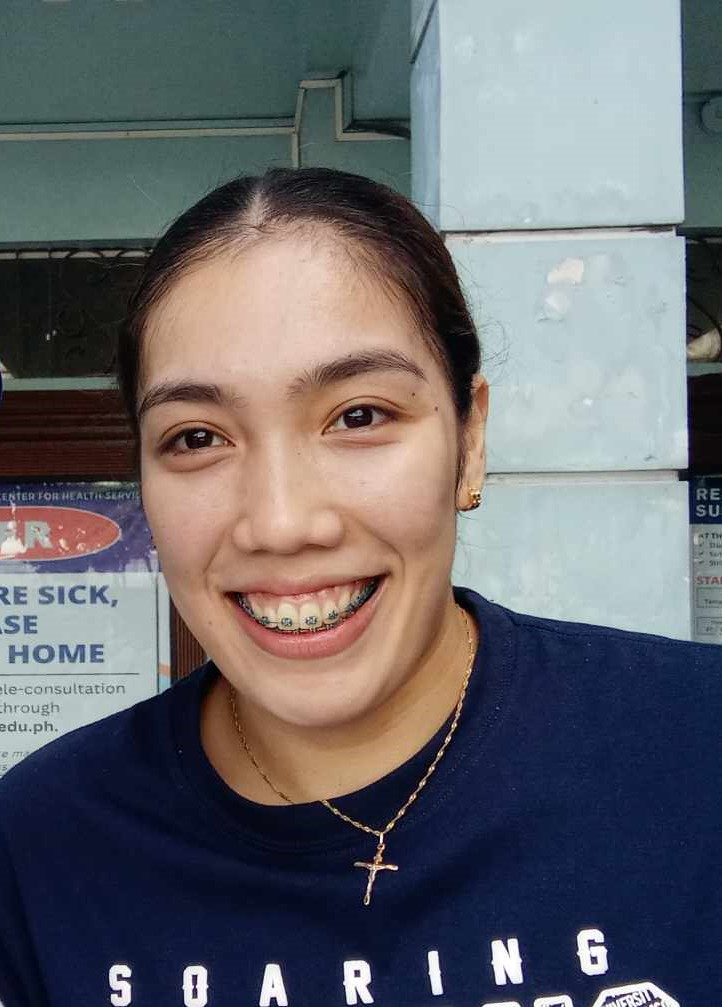
- Toring in 2023

Personal information
- Full name: Lorene Grace Montebon Toring
- Nationality: Filipino
- Born: February 17, 2000 (age 26)
- Home town: Cebu City
- Education: Adamson University (2019–2024)
- Height: 1.83 m (6 ft 0 in)

Volleyball information
- Position: Middle Blocker
- Number: 18

Lorene Grace Montebon Toring (born February 17, 2000) is a Filipino volleyball player. She played for the Adamson Soaring Lady Falcons in the UAAP before turning pro as a middle blocker for the Farm Fresh Foxies in the Premier Volleyball League.

== Early life ==
The Cebu Schools Athletic Foundation, Inc. (CESAFI) honored Toring as the Best Blocker in 2014 and 2015 before being recruited by UP, Ateneo, UE, and Adamson where she and her sister Ella ended up playing for its Lady Baby Falcons in the UAAP, a decision reached with prodding from their parents.

== Career ==
=== College ===
Toring's fifth and last playing year was cut short by an ACL injury in January 2024 made known only a month thereafter. Before that, she helped the Adamson Lady Falcons won several podium finishes in the UAAP and pre-season leagues, as well as a title when they beat the UST Growling Tigresses, 2–0, in the Premier Volleyball League Collegiate Conference Season 3 championships in 2019. She received 1st Best Middle Blocker honors from the PVL.

When Adamson won over the Akari Chargers to rule an invitational cup last February 7, 2024, Toring was no longer in the Lady Falcons' lineup.

She was part of the Philippine Team which participated in the 22nd Asian Senior Women's Volleyball Championship in Nakhon Ratchasima, Thailand from August 30 to September 6, 2023.

=== Club career ===
On February 15, 2024, Toring joined former Adamson players in the professional Premier Volleyball League (PVL) as an injured middle blocker for the Farm Fresh Foxies.

On January 18, 2025, the Foxies triumphed against the Nxled Chamelions behind debuting Toring and Jolina Dela Cruz, who both said that they felt grateful for almost a year of learning from the sidelines.

== Clubs ==
- (Philippines) Farm Fresh Foxies (2024–2026)
- (Philippines) Choco Mucho Flying Titans (2026–present)

== Awards ==
=== Individual ===
- 2023 Shakey's Super League Collegiate Pre-Season Championship – "2nd Best Middle Blocker"
- 2019 Premier Volleyball League Collegiate Conference – "1st Best Middle Blocker"

=== Collegiate team ===
- UAAP Season 85 volleyball tournaments – 2nd runners-up, with Adamson Soaring Lady Falcons
- 2019 Premier Volleyball League Collegiate Conference − Gold medal, with Adamson Soaring Lady Falcons
