= Strong Group Athletics =

Philippines sports sponsor

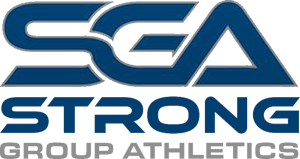
- Short name: Strong Group
- Sport: Basketball, Volleyball
- Owner: Frank Lao
- Website: www.sgathletics.com

Strong Group Athletics is an organization which sponsors basketball and volleyball teams in the Philippines. The Strong Group was founded by Filipino businessman Frank Lao.

== History ==
=== Basketball ===
Their basketball team has competed in the Dubai International Basketball Championship in the United Arab Emirates.

They debuted in the 2023 edition, with Mighty Sports and Acto City sponsoring their stint. Strong Group, coached by Charles Tiu, finished as quarterfinalists.

=== Volleyball ===
In 2023, they became the new main sponsor of the UE Lady Red Warriors volleyball team in the UAAP, acquiring six new recruited players and appointing Jerry Yee as the new head coach of the Lady Warriors.

The Strong Group also helped Premier Volleyball League club Quezon City Gerflor Defenders resolve its player salary issue which was first reported in November 2023, during the 2023 Second All-Filipino Conference. Gerflor would be effectively disbanded after the tournament.

In January 2024, they announced on their social media accounts that Strong Group Athletics would be taking over Gerflor's franchise. It will be Strong Group's second PVL team, the first being the Farm Fresh Foxies. The team which initially played under the SGA name would be renamed as the Zus Coffee Thunderbelles after the conclusion of the 2024 All-Filipino Conference.

Strong Group once again fielded a volleyball team under the name "Strong Group Pilipinas", with players derived from both Farm Fresh and Zus Coffee, for the 2026 Formosa Women's Volleyball Invitational Tournament in Taiwan. The combined SGA team finished as runners-up, losing to Japanese club Aleeza Aichi in the final.

== Affiliated teams ==
=== Current ===
==== Basketball ====
The following men's basketball teams are linked to the Strong Group:

- Strong Group Athletics (independent team; last competed in the Dubai International Basketball Championship)
- Converge FiberXers (Philippine Basketball Association)
- Benilde Blazers (NCAA)
- UE Junior Warriors (UAAP)
- UST Tiger Cubs (UAAP)
- Farm Fresh–Letran Milkers (Pilipinas Super League U-18)/Letran Squires (NCAA)

==== Volleyball ====
- Farm Fresh Foxies (Premier Volleyball League)
- Zus Coffee Thunderbelles (Premier Volleyball League)
- Strong Group Athletics (Farm Fresh/Zus Cofee select team; 2026 Formosa Invitational Tournament)
- Benilde Lady Blazers (NCAA)
- Letran Lady Knights (NCAA)
- UP Fighting Maroons (UAAP)
- UST Golden Tigresses (UAAP)

=== Former ===
==== Volleyball ====
- UE Lady Warriors (UAAP; 2023–2025)
