= Trisha Tubu =

Filipino volleyball player

Personal information
- Full name: Trisha Gayle Tubu
- Nationality: Filipino
- Born: October 24, 2000 (age 26) Dagupan, Pangasinan, Philippines
- Home town: Concepcion, Tarlac
- Education: Adamson
- Height: 5 ft 8 in (1.73 m)
- Weight: 62 kg (137 lb)

Volleyball information
- Position: Opposite spiker
- Current club: Farm Fresh Foxies
- Number: 12

Career
- Years: Team
- 2023–: Farm Fresh Foxies

Trisha Gayle Tubu (born October 24, 2000) is a Filipino volleyball player, who played for the Adamson Lady Falcons in the University Athletic Association of the Philippines (UAAP) before turning professional as an opposite spiker for the Farm Fresh Foxies in the Premier Volleyball League (PVL).

== Early life and education ==
Tubu was born on October 24, 2000, in Dagupan, Pangasinan, but hails from Concepcion, Tarlac. She studied at Adamson University in Manila for both her high school and collegiate studies.

== Career ==
Tubu played in the Central Luzon Regional Athletic Association (CLRAA), a regional sports meet for elementary and high school, and Palarong Pambansa.

=== High school ===
Tubu played for the Adamson Baby Falcons high school team in the University Athletic Association of the Philippines (UAAP). The team reach its first UAAP Girls' Volleyball championship appearance in Season 82 in 2019.

Due to a mixture of criticisms on her appearance, pressure, and homesickness, Tubu returned to her home province and took a hiatus in Season 84. She eventually returned to playing.

=== Collegiate ===
Tubu played for the Adamson Lady Falcons senior team in the 2022 V-League Collegiate Challenge where she was named Best Opposite Hitter.

Tubu made her senior UAAP debut for Adamson in UAAP Season 85 in 2023. The Falcons reached the Final Four for that season, ending Adamson's absence in the semifinals since Season 76 in 2014.

=== Professional ===
In June 2023, Trisha decided to turn professional by joining the Farm Fresh Foxies of the Premier Volleyball League (PVL) during the PVL Invitational Conference to support her ailing father.

On September 5, 2024, Tubu was awarded the Reinforced Conference Best Opposite Spiker and first-ever Farm Fresh player to obtain an individual award since they joined the PVL in 2023.

On January 30, 2025, Tubu scored a career-high 33 points as the Foxies defeated the Galeries Tower Highrisers in four sets in the PVL All-Filipino Conference. At the 2026 PVL Press Corps Awards Night, Tubu was named Season Most Valuable Player.

== Personal life ==
Tubu turned professional in 2023, prematurely ending her collegiate career to be able to support her ailing father who was a stroke-sufferer and needed medical expenses fulfilled. As a Premier Volleyball League player, she took the role as the primary financial provider of her family. Her father was declared fit for work by 2025 but the family discouraged him from continuing. Tubu also attested on how her siblings was able to fund their education.

She has been subjected to bullying in social media over her physical appearance which detractors perceived as masculine since her high school playing years. Tubu has reportedly taken the mockery in stride and has thanked supporters who have defended her.

== Clubs ==
- (Philippines) Farm Fresh Foxies (2023–present)

== Awards ==
=== Individual ===
- 2022 V-League Collegiate Challenge "Best Opposite Spiker"
- 2024 Premier Volleyball League Reinforced Conference "Best Opposite Spiker"
- 2024–25 Premier Volleyball League All-Filipino Conference "Best Opposite Spiker"
- 2025 Premier Volleyball League on Tour "Best Opposite Spiker"
- 2025 Premier Volleyball League Reinforced Conference "Best Opposite Spiker"
- 2026 Premier Volleyball League All-Filipino Conference "Best Opposite Spiker"
- 2026 PVL Press Corps "Season MVP"

=== Collegiate ===
- 2023 UAAP Women's Volleyball Tournament - Bronze medal, with Adamson Lady Falcons
- 2022 Shakey's Super League Collegiate Pre-Season Championship - Bronze medal, with Adamson Lady Falcons

=== High School ===
- 2019 UAAP Season 82 volleyball tournaments - Silver medal, with Adamson Baby Lady Falcons
