= Remy Palma =

Filipino volleyball player (born 1995)

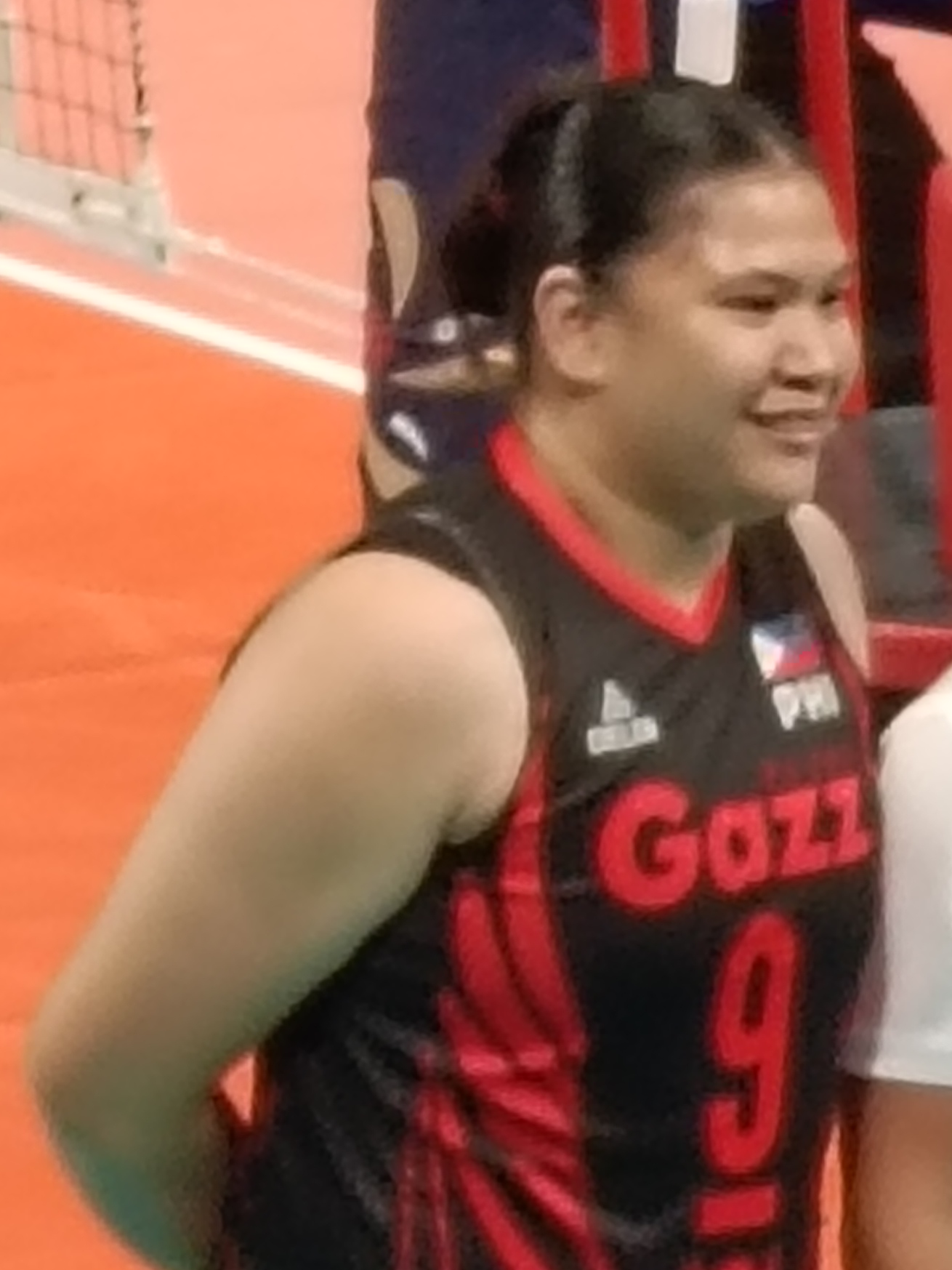
- Remy Palma in 2025

Personal information
- Full name: Mary Remy Joy Palma
- Nationality: Filipino
- Born: September 8, 1995 (age 31); Apalit, Pampanga, Philippines
- Hometown: Passi, Iloilo
- Height: 1.77 m (5 ft 10 in)
- Spike: 275 cm (108 in)
- Block: 270 cm (106 in)
- Education: Far Eastern University

Volleyball information
- Position: Middle Blocker
- Current team: Farm Fresh Foxies

Career
Years	Teams
2015	Philippine Army Lady Troopers
2016–2020	Petron Tri-Activ/Blaze Spikers
2021–2025	Petro Gazz Angels
2026–present	Farm Fresh Foxies

Mary Remy Joy Palma (born September 8, 1995) is a Filipina professional volleyball player who is also the assistant coach for the Farm Fresh Foxies of the Premier Volleyball League (PVL).

She played for the FEU Lady Tamaraws in the UAAP women's volleyball tournaments.

== Personal life ==
Palma studied BS Psychology at Far Eastern University.

== Career ==
Palma played for the FEU Lady Tamaraws in the UAAP as a middle blocker. She played her last playing year with the Lady Tamaraws in the UAAP Season 79 volleyball tournaments.

== Awards ==
=== Individuals ===
Year	League	Season/Conference	Award	Ref
2023	PVL	All-Filipino	1st Best Middle Blocker	
2024	PNVF	Champions League	1st Best Middle Blocker	

=== Collegiate ===
Year	League	Season/Conference	Title	Ref
2015	SVL	Collegiate	3rd Place	
2016	UAAP	78	3rd Place	
2017	PVL	Collegiate	Runner-up	

=== Clubs ===
Year	League	Season/Conference	Clubs	Title	Ref
2015	SVL	Open	Philippine Army Lady Troopers	Runner-up	
2016	PSL	Invitational	Petron Tri-Activ Spikers	Runner-up	
2016	PSL	Grand Prix	Petron Tri-Activ Spikers	Runner-up	
2017	PSL	Invitational	Petron Tri-Activ Spikers	Runner-up	
2017	PSL	All-Filipino	Petron Tri-Activ Spikers	Champions	
2017	PSL	Grand Prix	Petron Tri-Activ Spikers	Runner-up	
2018	PSL	Grand Prix	Petron Tri-Activ Spikers	Champions	
2018	PSL	Invitational	Petron Tri-Activ Spikers	Runner-up	
2018	PSL	All-Filipino	Petron Tri-Activ Spikers	Champions	
2019	PSL	Grand Prix	Petron Tri-Activ Spikers	Champions	
2019	PSL	All-Filipino	Petron Tri-Activ Spikers	3rd place	
2019	PSL	Invitational	Petron Tri-Activ Spikers	Runner-up	
2021	PVL	Open	Petro Gazz Angels	3rd place	
2022	PVL	Open	Petro Gazz Angels	Runner-up	
2022	PVL	Reinforced	Petro Gazz Angels	Champions	
2023	PVL	All-Filipino	Petro Gazz Angels	Runner-up	
2024	PNVF	Champions League	Petro Gazz Angels	Champions	
2024-25	PVL	All-Filipino	Petro Gazz Angels	Champions	
