= Louie Romero =

Filipino volleyball player

Personal information
- Nationality: Filipino
- Born: July 5, 2000 (age 26)
- Hometown: Rodriguez, Rizal
- Height: 5 ft 3 in (160 cm)
- Education: Adamson University

Volleyball information
- Position: Setter
- Current team: Farm Fresh Foxies
- Number: 7

Louie Romero (born July 5, 2000) is a Filipino volleyball player who plays as a setter and serves as team captain for the Farm Fresh Foxies of the Premier Volleyball League (PVL).

== Career ==
Romero made her first game appearance with Adamson Lady Falcons in the 2019 PVL Collegiate Conference where her team won the title against UST. She was awarded Most Valuable Player (Finals) in that season.

She made her first game appearance in the UAAP in 2020 where she became the Rookie-Captain of the Adamson Lady Falcons. Later on, the league was cancelled because of the COVID-19 pandemic.

In 2022, the UAAP came back after the league had been canceled for 2 years because of the COVID-19 pandemic. Her team finished 5th place after their loss against Ateneo. The following year, Ateneo lost twice to Adamson, the eventual 3rd placer of the UAAP Season 85 women's volleyball tournament.

== Clubs ==
- (Philippines) Farm Fresh Foxies (2023–present)

== Awards ==
=== Individual ===
Year	League	Season/Conference	Award	Ref
2017	Palarong Pambansa		Best Setter	
2019	PVL	Collegiate	MVP (Finals)	
2022	SSL	Pre-Season	Best Setter	
2022	V-League PH	Collegiate	Best Setter	

=== Collegiate ===
==== Adamson Lady Falcons ====
Year	League	Season/Conference	Title	Ref
2019	PVL	Collegiate	Champions	
2022	SSL	Pre-Season	3rd Place	
2022	V-League PH	Collegiate	Runner-up	
