= 2026–27 Nxled Chameleons season =

Filipino women's volleyball team season

The 2026–27 Nxled Chameleons season will be the fourth season of the Nxled Chameleons in the Premier Volleyball League (PVL).

The Nxled Chameleons opens their campaign in the PVL on Tour, also known as PVL on Tour Showdown, on a four-set loss to the Creamline Cool Smashers on July 8, 2026 in Ilagan, Isabela. Myla Pablo powers Nxled past Capital1 Solar Spikers on July 25, 2026, to record their first win of the on tour series in Vigan, Ilocos Sur. The Chameleons hiked their record to 2-1 with another straight-set win over the Galeries Tower Highrisers on August 1, 2026 in Polomolok, South Cotabato. On August 15, 2026, Nxled closes their on tour four-game pre-season with a 2–2 record after absorbing a three-set defeat to the Farm Fresh Foxies in Tubod, Lanao del Norte.

In the Invitational Conference, Nxled together with Creamline and PLDT all wound up with identical 3–2 record in the prelims, but the Chameleons grabbed the second finals berth with 10 FIVB tiebreak points. The Cool Smashers settled for third with nine, while the High Speed Hitters finished fourth with eight. Est Cola earlier grabbed the first championship slot due to their superior 4–1 record. For Nxled, it is the franchise's first-ever trip to the PVL finals, the Chameleons ultimately lost and finish runner-up to the young and energetic Est Cola Team. Nxled settled for a silver medal podium finished.

== Roster ==
Nxled Chameleons roster
No.	Nat.	Player	Pos.	Height	DOB	From
1	(Philippines)	Bang Pineda	Libero	1.60 m (5 ft 3 in)	January 21, 1991 (age 35)	Adamson
2	(Philippines)	Djanel Cheng	Setter	1.70 m (5 ft 7 in)	August 28, 1994 (age 32)	St. Benilde
3	(Philippines)	EJ Laure	Outside Hitter	1.75 m (5 ft 9 in)	July 31, 1997 (age 29)	UST
5	(Philippines)	Jules Tolentino	Setter	1.87 m (6 ft 2 in)	July 8, 2002 (age 24)	De La Salle
6	(Philippines)	Irah Jaboneta	Libero	1.62 m (5 ft 4 in)	March 7, 2001 (age 25)	UP
7	(Philippines)	Krich Macaslang	Middle Blocker	1.83 m (6 ft 0 in)	January 25, 2000 (age 26)	Adamson
8	(Philippines)	Myla Pablo	Outside Hitter	1.78 m (5 ft 10 in)	September 12, 1993 (age 33)	National-U
9	(Philippines)	Chiara Permentilla	Outside Hitter	1.73 m (5 ft 8 in)	November 26, 1997 (age 28)	Adamson
10	(Philippines) (United States)	Brooke Van Sickle (C)	Outside Hitter	1.75 m (5 ft 9 in)	March 22, 1999 (age 27)	Hawaiʻi
11	(Philippines)	Jackie Acuña	Middle Blocker	1.82 m (6 ft 0 in)	July 28, 2000 (age 26)	National-U
13	(Philippines) (United States)	MJ Phillips	Middle Blocker	1.82 m (6 ft 0 in)	June 15, 1995 (age 31)	Juniata
15	(Philippines)	Ranya Musa	Middle Blocker	1.80 m (5 ft 11 in)	February 13, 1997 (age 29)	St. Benilde
16	(Philippines)	Lyann De Guzman	Opposite Hitter	1.78 m (5 ft 10 in)	February 14, 2002 (age 24)	Ateneo
19	(Philippines)	Jovelyn Fernandez	Opposite Hitter	1.68 m (5 ft 6 in)	January 4, 2001 (age 25)	Far Eastern
20	(Philippines)	Jonah Sabete	Outside Hitter	1.70 m (5 ft 7 in)	January 29, 1994 (age 32)	Bulacan State
22	(Philippines)	Gel Cayuna	Setter	1.68 m (5 ft 6 in)	August 17, 1998 (age 28)	Far Eastern
23	(Philippines) (Nigeria)	Aduke Ogunsanya	Middle Blocker	1.80 m (5 ft 11 in)	October 2, 1996 (age 30)	De La Salle
24	(Philippines)	Jellie Tempiatura	Libero	1.57 m (5 ft 2 in)	July 24, 1997 (age 29)	Adamson
Updated as of: September 30, 2026 | Source: PVL.ph

Coaching staff

- Head coach:
  Ettore Guidetti
- Assistant coaches:
  Raffy Mosuela
  Lorden Tiu
  Ronchette Lee Villegas
  Jay Chua
  Billie Anima
- Statistician:
  Sid Gerella
  Ramona Bagatsing
- Strength & conditioning coach:
  Juan Paulo Sotelo

Team staff

- Team manager:
  Cha Cruz-Behag
- Team coordinator:
  Evelyn Dris
- Utility:
  Jerry Jun Agaton

Medical staff

- Physical therapist:
  Karen Cathleen Adubal
  Fe Marie Joy Accordon
- Nutritionist:
  Dr. Jo-Ann Tan Lorenzo

== Draft ==
Round	Pick	Player	Pos.	School
1	5	Irah Jaboneta	OH	UP

The Nxled Chameleons selected Irah Jaboneta with the 5th pick overall before passing during the second round.

== PVL on Tour ==
=== Results summary ===
Team	Game			
Team	1	2	3	4
Nxled (NXL)	CCS; 1–3	CAP; 3–0	GTH; 3–0	FFF; 0–3

Source: Premier Volleyball League
Legend: Blue = win; Red = loss

== Invitational Conference ==
The Nxled Chameleons qualified for the Invitational Conference as the #5 highest-ranked still-active team of the 2026 All-Filipino Conference.The second-place team, the Cignal Super Spikers, left the league during the off-season.

=== Preliminary round ===
==== Standings ====
Pos	Team	Pld	W	L	Pts	SW	SL	SR	SPW	SPL	SPR	Qualification
1	Est Cola	5	4	1	11	13	6	2.167	439	434	1.012	Finals
2	Nxled Chameleons	5	3	2	10	12	8	1.500	476	452	1.053	Finals
3	Creamline Cool Smashers	5	3	2	9	12	9	1.333	480	426	1.127	Third place match
4	PLDT High Speed Hitters	5	3	2	8	10	10	1.000	457	437	1.046	Third place match
5	Farm Fresh Foxies	5	1	4	4	7	13	0.538	426	455	0.936	Fifth place match

Source: Premier Volleyball League

==== Match log ====
2026 PVL Invitational Conference preliminary round match log
Total: 3–2 (10 points)
August: 0–1 (0 point)

Match	Date	Opponent	Sets	Total	Location Attendance	Record	Pts	Report
1	August 31, 2026	Creamline	1–3	88–98	Smart Araneta Coliseum; 2,725	0–1	0	P2

September: 3–1 (10 points)

Match	Date	Opponent	Sets	Total	Location Attendance	Record	Pts	Report
2	September 1, 2026	PLDT	3–0	75–61	Smart Araneta Coliseum; 370	1–1	3	P2
3	September 3, 2026	Est Cola	2–3	114–113	Smart Araneta Coliseum; 741	1–2	4	P2
4	September 4, 2026	Ho Chi Minh City	3–1	106–92	Smart Araneta Coliseum; 1,001	2–2	7	P2
5	September 6, 2026	Farm Fresh	3–1	93–88	Smart Araneta Coliseum; 2,400	3–2	10	P2

=== Final round ===
==== Match log ====
2026 PVL Invitational Conference final round match log
Total: 0–1 (0 point)
Championship: 0–1 (0 point)

Date	Opponent	Sets	Total	Location Attendance	Report
September 8, 2026	Est Cola	0–3	62–75	Smart Araneta Coliseum; 1,975	P2

== All-Filipino Conference ==
=== Preliminary round ===
==== Standings ====
Pos	Team	Pld	W	L	Pts	SW	SL	SR	SPW	SPL	SPR	Qualification
1	Nxled Chameleons	8	8	0	23	24	6	4.000	713	608	1.173	Twice-to-beat in semifinals
2	Creamline Cool Smashers	8	5	3	16	19	11	1.727	701	641	1.094	Twice-to-beat in semifinals
3	Choco Mucho Flying Titans	8	5	3	15	20	15	1.333	783	736	1.064	Twice-to-win in semifinals
4	Farm Fresh Foxies	8	5	3	14	19	16	1.188	758	755	1.004	Twice-to-win in semifinals
5	PLDT High Speed Hitters	8	4	4	13	15	15	1.000	677	666	1.017	

Source: Premier Volleyball League

==== Match log ====
2026–27 PVL All-Filipino Conference Siklab series preliminary round match log
Total: 8–0 (23 points)
October: 3–0 (8 points)

Match	Date	Opponent	Sets	Total	Location Attendance	Record	Pts	Report
1	October 13, 2026	PLDT	3–0	75–54	Smart Araneta Coliseum; 565	1–0	3	P2
2	October 17, 2026	Farm Fresh	3–2	108–98	Filoil Centre; 532	2–0	5	P2
3	October 22, 2026	Galeries Tower	3–1	97–77	SM Mall of Asia Arena; 453	3–0	8	P2

November: 5–0 (15 points)

Match	Date	Opponent	Sets	Total	Location Attendance	Record	Pts	Report
4	November 3, 2026	Choco Mucho	3–1	98–88	Smart Araneta Coliseum; 1,008	4–0	11	P2
5	November 7, 2026	Capital1	3–0	75–50	PhilSports Arena; 1,017	5–0	14	P2
6	November 12, 2026	Akari	3–0	78–71	Smart Araneta Coliseum; 2,053	6–0	17	P2
7	November 17, 2026	Creamline	3–1	87–85	PhilSports Arena; 2,174	7–0	20	P2
8	November 21, 2026	Zus Coffee	3–1	95–85	PhilSports Arena; 1,309	8–0	23	P2

== Transactions ==
=== Additions ===
Player	Date signed	Previous team	Ref.
Gel Cayuna	May 23, 2026	Cignal Super Spikers	
Jackie Acuña	May 23, 2026	Cignal Super Spikers	
Irah Jaboneta	July 7, 2026	UP Fighting Maroons (UAAP)	

=== Subtractions ===
Player	New team	Ref.
Joyme Cagande	Akari Chargers	
Aby Maraño	Retired	
Mayang Nuique	Capital1 Solar Spikers	
