= List of Premier Volleyball League champions =

The Premier Volleyball League (PVL) Finals is the championship series of a PVL conference, contested by the final two teams. In most conferences, the championship is a best-of-three series though it is occasionally held, particularly in more recent conferences, as a single game. Starting from the 2026–27 All-Filipino Conference, the league will also begin declaring an overall season champion, dubbed the Philippine Grand Champion.

== Champions ==
The parentheses indicate the number of times that teams have appeared in a PVL Finals as well as each respective team's PVL Finals record to date. Preseason tournaments which declare a champion are also included and counted.

Season	Conference	Winning team	Coach	Result	Losing team	Coach	Finals MVP	Ref.
2017	Reinforced	Pocari Sweat Lady Warriors (1, 1–0)	Rommel Abella	2–1	BaliPure Purest Water Defenders (1, 0–1)	Roger Gorayeb	Myla Pablo	
2017	Open	BaliPure Purest Water Defenders (2, 1–1)	Roger Gorayeb	2–0	Pocari Sweat Lady Warriors (2, 1–1)	Rico de Guzman	Grethcel Soltones	
2017	Collegiate	NU Lady Bulldogs (1, 1–0)	Babes Castillo	2–0	FEU Lady Tamaraws (1, 0–1)	George Pascua	Jasmine Nabor	
2018	Reinforced	Creamline Cool Smashers (1, 1–0)	Tai Bundit	2–0	PayMaya High Flyers (1, 0–1)	Roger Gorayeb	Jia Morado	
2018	Collegiate	UP Lady Fighting Maroons (1, 1–0)	Godfrey Okumu	2–0	FEU Lady Tamaraws (2, 0–2)	George Pascua	Isa Molde	
2018	Open	Creamline Cool Smashers (2, 2–0)	Tai Bundit	2–0	Ateneo–Motolite Lady Eagles (1, 0–1)	Oliver Almadro	Jia Morado	
2019	Reinforced	Petro Gazz Angels (1, 1–0)	Arnold Laniog	2–1	Creamline Cool Smashers (3, 2–1)	Tai Bundit	Janisa Johnson	
2019	Open	Creamline Cool Smashers (4, 3–1)	Tai Bundit	2–0	Petro Gazz Angels (2, 1–1)	Arnold Laniog	Jia Morado	
2019	Collegiate	Adamson Lady Falcons (1, 1–0)	Lerma Giron	2–0	UST Golden Tigresses (1, 0–1)	Kungfu Reyes	Louie Romero	
2021	Open	Chery Tiggo Crossovers (1, 1–0)	Aaron Vélez	2–1	Creamline Cool Smashers (5, 3–2)	Tai Bundit	Jaja Santiago	
2022	Open	Creamline Cool Smashers (6, 4–2)	Sherwin Meneses	2–0	Petro Gazz Angels (3, 1–2)	Jerry Yee	Alyssa Valdez	
2022	Invitational	Creamline Cool Smashers (7, 5–2)	Sherwin Meneses	3–0 (Note: Played as a single match)	KingWhale Taipei (Note: Invited guest team) (1, 0–1)	Teng Yen-Min	Celine Domingo	
2022	Reinforced	Petro Gazz Angels (4, 2–2)	Rald Ricafort	2–0	Cignal HD Spikers (1, 0–1)	Shaq Delos Santos	Lindsey Vander Weide	
2023	First All-Filipino	Creamline Cool Smashers (8, 6–2)	Sherwin Meneses	2–1	Petro Gazz Angels (5, 2–3)	Oliver Almadro	Jia de Guzman	
2023	Invitational	Kurashiki Ablaze (1, 1–0)	Hideo Suzuki	3–2	Creamline Cool Smashers (9, 6–3)	Sherwin Meneses	Kyoka Ohshima	
2023	Second All-Filipino	Creamline Cool Smashers (10, 7–3)	Sherwin Meneses	2–0	Choco Mucho Flying Titans (1, 0–1)	Dante Alinsunurin	Tots Carlos	
2024	2024 All-Filipino	Creamline Cool Smashers (11, 8–3)	Sherwin Meneses	2–0	Choco Mucho Flying Titans (2, 0–2)	Dante Alinsunurin	Jessica Galanza	
2024	Reinforced	Creamline Cool Smashers (12, 9–3)	Sherwin Meneses	3–0	Akari Chargers (1, 0–1)	Takayuki Minowa	Bernadeth Pons	
2024	Invitational	Creamline Cool Smashers (13, 10–3)	Sherwin Meneses	3–2	Cignal HD Spikers (2, 0–2)	Shaq Delos Santos	Kyle Negrito	
2024	2024–25 All-Filipino	Petro Gazz Angels (6, 3–3)	Koji Tsuzurabara	2–1	Creamline Cool Smashers (14, 10–4)	Sherwin Meneses	MJ Phillips	
2025–26	PVL on Tour (Note: Preseason tournament)	PLDT High Speed Hitters (1, 1–0)	Rald Ricafort	3–2	Chery Tiggo Crossovers (2, 1–1)	Norman Miguel	Mika Reyes	
2025–26	Invitational	PLDT High Speed Hitters (2, 2–0)	Rald Ricafort	3–1	Kobe Shinwa University (1, 0–1)	Kiyokazu Yamamoto	Kath Arado	
2025–26	Reinforced	Petro Gazz Angels (7, 4–3)	Gary Van Sickle	3–1	Zus Coffee Thunderbelles (1, 0–1)	Jerry Yee	MJ Phillips	
2025–26	All-Filipino	Creamline Cool Smashers (15, 11–4)	Sherwin Meneses	2–0	Cignal Super Spikers (3, 0–3)	Shaq Delos Santos	Bernadeth Pons	
2026–27	Invitational	Est Cola (1, 1–0)	Wanna Buakaew	3–0	Nxled Chameleons (1, 0–1)	Ettore Guidetti	Not awarded	

== Results by team ==
=== Commercial ===
Team	App.	Win	Loss	PCT	Winning conference(s)
Creamline Cool Smashers	15	11	4	.714	2018 Reinforced, 2018 Open, 2019 Open, 2022 Open, 2022 Invitational, 2023 First All-Filipino, 2023 Second All-Filipino, 2024 All-Filipino, 2024 Reinforced, 2024 Invitational, 2026 All-Filipino
Petro Gazz Angels	7	4	3	.571	2019 Reinforced, 2022 Reinforced, 2024–25 All-Filipino, 2025 Reinforced
PLDT High Speed Hitters	2	2	0	1.000	2025 PVL on Tour, 2025 Invitational
BaliPure Purest Water Defenders	2	1	1	.500	2017 Open
Pocari Sweat Lady Warriors	2	1	1	.500	2017 Reinforced
Chery Tiggo Crossovers	2	1	1	.500	2021 Open
Kurashiki Ablaze	1	1	0	1.000	2023 Invitational
Est Cola	1	1	0	1.000	2026 Invitational
Cignal HD Spikers	3	0	3	.000	—
Choco Mucho Flying Titans	2	0	2	.000	—
Akari Chargers	1	0	1	.000	—
Ateneo–Motolite Lady Eagles	1	0	1	.000	—
KingWhale Taipei	1	0	1	.000	—
Nxled Chameleons	1	0	1	.000	
PayMaya High Flyers	1	0	1	.000	—
Zus Coffee Thunderbelles	1	0	1	.000	—

=== Collegiate ===
Team	App.	Win	Loss	PCT	Winning conference(s)
Adamson Lady Falcons	1	1	0	1.000	2019 Collegiate
NU Lady Bulldogs	1	1	0	1.000	2017 Collegiate
UP Lady Fighting Maroons	1	1	0	1.000	2018 Collegiate
FEU Lady Tamaraws	2	0	2	.000	—
UST Golden Tigresses	1	0	1	.000	—
Kobe Shinwa University	1	0	1	.000	—
