= 2025–26 Nxled Chameleons season =

Third season of the Nxled Chameleons

The 2025–26 Nxled Chameleons season was the third season of the Nxled Chameleons in the Premier Volleyball League (PVL).

In the preseason PVL on Tour, the team made a surprise run winning their first three matches of the prelims. A crucial win against the Farm Fresh Foxies in their final match gave the Chameleons their first-ever advancement into the final round. Unfortunately, the team was swept by Chery Tiggo and were eliminated in the quarterfinals, putting them out of contention for an Invitational Conference slot.

For the Reinforced Conference, Nxled brought in Spanish player Paola Martinez Vela as their foreign guest player.

Before the All-Filipino Conference began, Nxled was reported to be part of a proposed merger with the Petro Gazz Angels, a move that was disallowed by the league on January 7. From January 13–15, Nxled entered a series of player acquisitions, including a majority of the Petro Gazz roster, culminating with the signing of star players Brooke Van Sickle, MJ Phillips, and Myla Pablo.

== Roster ==
Nxled Chameleons roster
No.	Nat.	Player	Pos.	Height	DOB	From
2	(Philippines)	Djanel Cheng	Setter	1.70 m (5 ft 7 in)	August 28, 1994 (age 31)	St. Benilde
3	(Philippines)	EJ Laure	Outside Hitter	1.75 m (5 ft 9 in)	July 31, 1997 (age 28)	UST
5	(Philippines)	Jules Tolentino	Setter	1.87 m (6 ft 2 in)	July 8, 2002 (age 24)	De La Salle
6	(Philippines)	Janel Delerio	Libero	1.57 m (5 ft 2 in)	June 21, 1999 (age 27)	UST
7	(Philippines)	Krich Macaslang	Middle Blocker	1.83 m (6 ft 0 in)	January 25, 2000 (age 26)	Adamson
8	(Philippines)	Myla Pablo	Outside Hitter	1.78 m (5 ft 10 in)	September 12, 1993 (age 32)	National-U
9	(Philippines)	Chiara Permentilla	Outside Hitter	1.73 m (5 ft 8 in)	November 26, 1997 (age 28)	Adamson
10	(Philippines) (United States)	Brooke Van Sickle (C)	Outside Hitter	1.75 m (5 ft 9 in)	March 22, 1999 (age 27)	Hawaiʻi
11	(Philippines)	Razel Aldea	Middle Blocker	1.69 m (5 ft 7 in)	August 29, 1999 (age 26)	UPHSD
12	(Philippines)	Mayang Nuique	Opposite Hitter	1.73 m (5 ft 8 in)	July 20, 2002 (age 24)	Adamson
13	(Philippines) (United States)	MJ Phillips	Middle Blocker	1.82 m (6 ft 0 in)	June 15, 1995 (age 31)	Juniata
14	(Philippines)	Jaycel delos Reyes	Middle Blocker	1.78 m (5 ft 10 in)	July 4, 1999 (age 27)	Ateneo
15	(Philippines)	Ranya Musa	Middle Blocker	1.80 m (5 ft 11 in)	February 13, 1997 (age 29)	St. Benilde
16	(Philippines)	Lyann De Guzman	Opposite Hitter	1.78 m (5 ft 10 in)	February 14, 2002 (age 24)	Ateneo
17	(Philippines)	Lucille Almonte	Libero	1.73 m (5 ft 8 in)	January 25, 2001 (age 25)	Adamson
18	(Philippines)	Joyme Cagande	Setter	1.63 m (5 ft 4 in)	February 18, 1999 (age 27)	National-U
20	(Philippines)	Jonah Sabete	Outside Hitter	1.70 m (5 ft 7 in)	January 29, 1994 (age 32)	Bulacan State
21	(Philippines)	Bang Pineda	Libero	1.60 m (5 ft 3 in)	January 21, 1991 (age 35)	Adamson
22	(Philippines)	Jovelyn Fernandez	Opposite Hitter	1.68 m (5 ft 6 in)	January 4, 2001 (age 25)	Far Eastern
23	(Philippines) (Nigeria)	Aduke Ogunsanya	Middle Blocker	1.80 m (5 ft 11 in)	October 2, 1996 (age 29)	De La Salle
24	(Philippines)	Jellie Tempiatura	Libero	1.57 m (5 ft 2 in)	July 24, 1997 (age 29)	Adamson
25	(Philippines)	Aby Maraño	Middle Blocker	1.75 m (5 ft 9 in)	December 22, 1992 (age 33)	De La Salle
–	(Philippines)	Antonette Adolfo	Opposite Hitter	1.70 m (5 ft 7 in)	March 23, 2001 (age 25)	Adamson
–	(Philippines)	Nicole Tiamzon	Outside Hitter	1.68 m (5 ft 6 in)	November 3, 1995 (age 30)	Philippines

Coaching staff

- Head coach:
  Ettore Guidetti
- Assistant coaches:
  Raffy Mosuela
  Lorden Tiu
  Ronchette Lee Villegas
  Sid Gerella
  Jay Chua
  Ramona Bagatsing
  Billie Anima

Team staff

- Team managers:
  Dzi Gervacio
  Cha Cruz-Behag
- Utility:
  Jerry Jun Agaton

Medical staff

- Strength & conditioning coach:
  Juan Paulo Sotelo
- Physical therapist:
  Jill De Roxas
  Shane Nathalia Co
- Nutritionist:
  Dr. Jo-Ann Tan Lorenzo

== Draft ==
Round	Pick	Player	Pos.	School
1	4	Lyann de Guzman	OH/OP	Ateneo
2	13	Mayang Nuique	MB/OP	Adamson

== PVL on Tour ==
=== Preliminary round ===
==== Pool A standings ====
Pos	Team	Pld	W	L	Pts	SW	SL	SR	SPW	SPL	SPR	Qualification
1	PLDT High Speed Hitters	5	5	0	15	15	1	15.000	400	298	1.342	Final round
2	Nxled Chameleons	5	4	1	11	12	6	2.000	408	381	1.071	Final round
3	Farm Fresh Foxies	5	3	2	9	9	7	1.286	359	371	0.968	Knockout round
4	Petro Gazz Angels	5	2	3	7	8	10	0.800	390	406	0.961	Knockout round
5	Choco Mucho Flying Titans	5	1	4	3	7	13	0.538	439	481	0.913	Knockout round

Source: PVL.ph

==== Match log ====
2025 PVL on Tour preliminary round match log
Total: 4–1 (11 points)
June: 2–0 (5 points)

Match	Date	Opponent	Sets	Total	Location Attendance	Record	Pts	Report
1	June 28, 2025	Petro Gazz	3–2	103–98	Batangas City Sports Center; 2,157	1–0	2	P2
2	June 29, 2025	Choco Mucho	3–1	103–95	Batangas City Sports Center; 3,340	2–0	5	P2

July: 2–1 (6 points)

Match	Date	Opponent	Sets	Total	Location Attendance	Record	Pts	Report
3	July 13, 2025	Galeries Tower	3–0	76–70	Filoil Centre; 515	3–0	8	P2
4	July 26, 2025	PLDT	0–3	49–75	University of San Jose–Recoletos; 2,157	3–1	8	P2
5	July 27, 2025	Farm Fresh	3–0	75–43	University of San Jose–Recoletos; 1,589	4–1	11	P2

=== Final round ===
==== Bracket ====
Quarterfinals
August 7
1 PLDT	3
8 Zus Coffee	0
August 9
4 Creamline	3
5 Farm Fresh	0
August 7
2 Cignal	3
7 Akari	0
August 9
3 Nxled	0
6 Chery Tiggo	3

Semifinals
August 12
PLDT	3
Creamline	2
August 12
Cignal	1
Chery Tiggo	3

Championship
August 17
PLDT	3
Chery Tiggo	2
3rd place match
August 17
Creamline	3
Cignal	0

==== Match log ====
2025 PVL on Tour final round match log
Total: 0–1 (0 points)
Quarterfinals: 0–1 (0 points)

Date	Opponent	Sets	Total	Location Attendance	Report
August 9, 2025	Chery Tiggo	0–3	52–75	PhilSports Arena; 2,223	P2

== Reinforced Conference ==
=== Preliminary round ===
==== Standings ====
Pos	Team	Pld	W	L	Pts	SW	SL	SR	SPW	SPL	SPR	Qualification
8	Akari Chargers	8	4	4	12	18	16	1.125	749	731	1.025	Quarterfinals
9	Choco Mucho Flying Titans	8	3	5	9	11	17	0.647	621	660	0.941	
10	Chery Tiggo EV Crossovers	8	2	6	6	12	20	0.600	673	724	0.930	
11	Nxled Chameleons	8	0	8	1	5	24	0.208	576	701	0.822	
12	Galeries Tower Highrisers	8	0	8	0	2	24	0.083	465	635	0.732	

Source: Premier Volleyball League

==== Match log ====
2025 PVL Reinforced Conference preliminary round match log
Total: 0–8 (1 point)
First round: 0–5 (1 point)

Match	Date	Opponent	Sets	Total	Location Attendance	Record	Pts	Report
1	October 9, 2025	Farm Fresh	1–3	88–97	City of Dasmariñas Arena; 670	0–1	0	P2
2	October 16, 2025	Capital1	1–3	82–100	Smart Araneta Coliseum; 1,297	0–2	0	P2
3	October 21, 2025	Choco Mucho	0–3	64–75	Smart Araneta Coliseum; 1,241	0–3	0	P2
4	October 25, 2025	Cignal	2–3	100–109	Ynares Center Montalban; 792	0–4	1	P2
5	October 31, 2025	PLDT	0–3	63–75	Filoil Centre; 2,352	0–5	1	P2

Second round: 0–3 (0 points)

Match	Date	Opponent	Sets	Total	Location Attendance	Record	Pts	Report
6	November 6, 2025	Creamline	1–3	72–95	Filoil Centre; 568	0–6	1	P2
7	November 13, 2025	Akari	0–3	52–75	Smart Araneta Coliseum; 2,074	0–7	1	P2
8	November 18, 2025	Zus Coffee	0–3	55–75	Ynares Center Montalban; 736	0–8	1	P2

== All-Filipino Conference ==
=== Preliminary round ===
==== Standings ====
Pos	Team	Pld	W	L	Pts	SW	SL	SR	SPW	SPL	SPR	Qualification
3	Creamline Cool Smashers	9	6	3	16	20	16	1.250	700	662	1.057	Qualifying round
4	Farm Fresh Foxies	9	5	4	17	22	16	1.375	850	771	1.102	Qualifying round
5	Nxled Chameleons	9	5	4	15	20	16	1.250	810	773	1.048	Play-in tournament semifinals
6	Akari Chargers	9	5	4	15	19	18	1.056	792	838	0.945	Play-in tournament semifinals
7	Choco Mucho Flying Titans	9	4	5	13	19	19	1.000	828	826	1.002	Play-in tournament quarterfinals

Source: Premier Volleyball League

==== Match log ====
2026 PVL All-Filipino Conference preliminary round match log
Total: 5–4 (15 points)
February: 3–2 (8 points)

Match	Date	Opponent	Sets	Total	Location Attendance	Record	Pts	Report
1	February 3, 2026	Farm Fresh	3–2	99–100	Filoil Centre; 636	1–0	2	P2
2	February 7, 2026	Capital1	3–0	78–62	Ynares Center Montalban; 536	2–0	5	P2
3	February 14, 2026	Cignal	3–0	77–66	Ynares Center Antipolo; 939	3–0	8	P2
4	February 19, 2026	Galeries Tower	1–3	85–92	Filoil Centre; 440	3–1	8	P2
5	February 24, 2026	Akari	1–3	88–98	Filoil Centre; 550	3–2	8	P2

March: 2–2 (7 points)

Match	Date	Opponent	Sets	Total	Location Attendance	Record	Pts	Report
6	March 3, 2026	Choco Mucho	1–3	95–96	Filoil Centre; 1,450	0–1	8	P2
7	March 7, 2026	Creamline	2–3	97–102	Filoil Centre; 2,989	0–2	9	P2
8	March 12, 2026	Zus Coffee	3–1	95–82	Filoil Centre; 1,444	1–2	12	P2
9	March 19, 2026	PLDT	3–1	96–75	Filoil Centre; 799	2–2	15	P2

=== Play-in tournament ===
==== Pool A ====
Play-in pool A quarterfinal
8	Capital1	0
9	Galeries Tower	3

Play-in pool A semifinal
5	Nxled	3
9	Galeries Tower	0

Play-in pool A final
4	Farm Fresh	3
5	Nxled	0

==== Match log ====
2026 PVL All-Filipino Conference play-in tournament match log
Total: 1–1 (3 points)
Play-in tournament: 1–1 (3 points)

Match	Date	Opponent	Sets	Total	Location Attendance	Record	Pts	Report
1	March 28, 2026	Galeries Tower	3–0	75–64	Ninoy Aquino Stadium; 1,875	1–0	3	P2
2	April 7, 2026	Farm Fresh	0–3	56–75	Filoil Centre; 2,466	1–1	3	P2

== Transactions ==
=== Additions ===
Player	Date signed	Previous team	Ref.
Janel Delerio	May 6, 2025	Farm Fresh Foxies	
Jovelyn Fernandez	May 6, 2025	Cignal HD Spikers	
Lyann De Guzman	June 9, 2025	Ateneo Blue Eagles (UAAP)	
Mayang Nuique	June 14, 2025	Adamson Lady Falcons (UAAP)	
Djanel Cheng	January 13, 2026	Petro Gazz Angels	
Aby Maraño	January 13, 2026	Chery Tiggo EV Crossovers	
Ranya Musa	January 13, 2026	Petro Gazz Angels	
Aduke Ogunsanya	January 13, 2026	Choco Mucho Flying Titans	
Jonah Sabete	January 13, 2026	Petro Gazz Angels	
Antonette Adolfo	January 14, 2026	Petro Gazz Angels	
Joyme Cagande	January 14, 2026	Chery Tiggo EV Crossovers	
Bang Pineda	January 14, 2026	Petro Gazz Angels	
Jellie Tempiatura	January 14, 2026	Petro Gazz Angels	
Nicole Tiamzon	January 14, 2026	Petro Gazz Angels	
Brooke Van Sickle	January 15, 2026	Petro Gazz Angels	
Myla Pablo	January 15, 2026	Petro Gazz Angels	
MJ Phillips	January 15, 2026	Petro Gazz Angels	
Jules Tolentino	January 15, 2026	Petro Gazz Angels	

=== Subtractions ===
Player	New team	Ref.
Jaila Atienza	Choco Mucho Flying Titans	
Lycha Ebon	Galeries Tower Highrisers	
Rachel Jorvina	Capital1 Solar Spikers	
May Luna-Lumahan	Retired	
Maji Mangulabnan	Galeries Tower Highrisers	
Jaja Maraguinot	Free agent	
Lia Pelaga	Galeries Tower Highrisers	
Ivy Perez	Galeries Tower Highrisers	
Bang Pineda	Petro Gazz Angels	

=== Foreign guest player ===
Team	Foreign player	Moving from	Ref.
Nxled Chameleons	(Spain) Paola Martinez Vela	(Romania) Dinamo Bucureşti	
