= 2026–27 Premier Volleyball League season =

Ninth season of the Premier Volleyball League

- 10th anniversary logo
- League: Premier Volleyball League
- Sport: Volleyball
- Duration: July 8 – September 8, 2026 (preseason); October 10, 2026 – April 2027
- TV partners: One Sports; One Sports+
- Streaming partner(s): Cignal Play; One Sports YouTube Channel

Rookie Draft
- Top draft pick: Camilla Lamina
- Picked by: Galeries Tower

Conferences
- 2026 Invitational Conference champions: Est Cola
- 2026 Invitational Conference runners-up: Nxled

PVL seasons
- ← 2025–26 2027–28 →

The 2026–27 Premier Volleyball League season is the tenth season (ninth season of play) of the Premier Volleyball League and its sixth as a professional league. The season will formally start on October 10, 2026, which will also mark that start of its 10th anniversary celebrations. Before that, the league held the PVL on Tour and the Invitational Conference as part of a larger preseason.

The league contracted to nine teams this season as the Chery Tiggo Crossovers, Petro Gazz Angels, and Cignal Super Spikers all departed during the previous season.

The league is expected to introduce trades sometime this season.

This season will see the league crown its first season champion, dubbed the "Philippine Grand Champion", to be determined at the conclusion of the final conference, the 2026–27 All-Filipino Conference.

== 10th anniversary celebrations ==
This season will coincide with the 10th anniversary of the league's establishment from when it rebranded from the Shakey's V-League. The league's 10th anniversary logo was unveiled on August 27, 2026, with a series of events to follow throughout the season. On September 3, Sports Vision announced that the opening matchday will be held at SM Seaside Cebu Arena in Cebu City, and that the men's league, Spikers' Turf, will open its 10th season on the same day. Coincidentally, to mark the occasion, the opening matchday is set for October 10 or "10/10".

== Teams ==
2026–27 Premier Volleyball League season teams
Abbr.	Team	Affiliation	Head coach	Team captain
AKA	Akari Chargers	Akari Lighting & Technology	(Philippines) Tina Salak	Justine Jazareno
CAP	Capital1 Solar Spikers	CapitalOne Energy Corp.	(Brazil) Jorge de Brito	Pauline Gaston
CMF	Choco Mucho Flying Titans	Republic Biscuit Corporation	(Philippines) Dante Alinsunurin	Desiree Cheng
CCS	Creamline Cool Smashers	Republic Biscuit Corporation	(Philippines) Sherwin Meneses	Alyssa Valdez
FFF	Farm Fresh Foxies	Farm Fresh Philippine International / Strong Group Athletics	(Japan) Koji Tsuzurabara	Louie Romero
GTH	Galeries Tower Highrisers	Grand Taipan Land Development	(Philippines) Aying Esteban	TBA
NXL	Nxled Chameleons	Akari Lighting & Technology	(Italy) Ettore Guidetti	Brooke Van Sickle
HSH	PLDT High Speed Hitters	PLDT Inc.	(Philippines) Rald Ricafort	Kath Arado
ZUS	Zus Coffee Thunderbelles	Zuspresso Sdn. Bhd. / Strong Group Athletics	(Philippines) Jerry Yee	Cloanne Mondoñedo

== Transactions ==
=== Retirement ===
- On August 3, 2026, Jules Samonte announced her retirement from professional volleyball. Since joining the PVL in 2021, she played for the Perlas Spikers, PLDT High Speed Hitters, Chery Tiggo Crossovers and Galeries Tower Highrisers.
- On September 16, 2026, Aby Maraño announced her retirement from professional volleyball. Since joining the PVL in 2021, she played for the F2 Logistics Cargo Movers, Chery Tiggo Crossovers and Nxled Chameleons.
- On September 18, 2026, Maika Ortiz announced her retirement from professional volleyball. Since joining the PVL in 2021, she played for the Chery Tiggo Crossovers, Choco Mucho Flying Titans and Zus Coffee Thunderbelles.

=== Notable moves ===
- On April 28, 2026, all Cignal Super Spikers players were released as the team took a leave of absence.
- On May 14, 2026, former Cignal star players Vanie Gandler and Erika Santos signed with the Capital1 Solar Spikers.
- On August 7, 2026, Jaja Santiago returned to the league after over five years. She signed a two-conference contract with the Creamline Cool Smashers.

== Draft ==
The 2026 Premier Volleyball League draft was held on June 3, 2026, at Novotel Manila Araneta City in Quezon City. The first pick was made by the Galeries Tower Highrisers.

== PVL on Tour ==
The Premier Volleyball League on Tour will return for its third running starting on July 8, 2026 in Ilagan, Isabela. The 2026 Tour will be an exhibition series similar to the 2017 edition, but with all matches to be played with an added set of experimental rules.

=== Results summary ===
Team	Game			
Team	1	2	3	4
Akari (AKA)	ZUS; 1–3	CMF; 3–1	HSH; 1–3	
Capital1 (CAP)	NXL; 0–3	CCS; *Aug. 8	FFF; 2–3	
Choco Mucho (CMF)	ZUS; 0–3	HSH; 1–3	AKA; 1–3	
Creamline (CCS)	NXL; 3–1	CAP; *Aug. 8	GTH; 3–0	
Farm Fresh (FFF)	GTH; 1–3	NXL; 3–0	CAP; 3–2	
Galeries Tower (GTH)	FFF; 3–1	NXL; 0–3	CCS; 0–3	
Nxled (NXL)	CCS; 1–3	CAP; 3–0	GTH; 3–0	FFF; 0–3
PLDT (HSH)	CMF; 3–1	ZUS; *Aug. 8	AKA; 3–1	
Zus Coffee (ZUS)	AKA; 3–1	CMF; 3–0	HSH; *Aug. 8	

Source: Premier Volleyball League
Legend: Blue = win; Red = loss
- August 8 matches were cancelled due to Tropical Depression Maymay.

== Invitational Conference ==
The first conference of the season was the Invitational Conference which started on August 31, 2026 and ended on September 8.

=== Preliminary round ===
Pos	Team	Pld	W	L	Pts	SW	SL	SR	SPW	SPL	SPR	Qualification
1	Est Cola	5	4	1	11	13	6	2.167	439	434	1.012	Finals
2	Nxled Chameleons	5	3	2	10	12	8	1.500	476	452	1.053	Finals
3	Creamline Cool Smashers	5	3	2	9	12	9	1.333	480	426	1.127	Third place match
4	PLDT High Speed Hitters	5	3	2	8	10	10	1.000	457	437	1.046	Third place match
5	Farm Fresh Foxies	5	1	4	4	7	13	0.538	426	455	0.936	Fifth place match
6	Ho Chi Minh City	5	1	4	3	5	13	0.385	373	447	0.834	Fifth place match

Source: Premier Volleyball League

=== Final round ===
==== Fifth place match ====
September 8; 1:30 pm	Ho Chi Minh City	0–3	Farm Fresh Foxies	Smart Araneta Coliseum, Quezon City; Attendance: 531; Referees: Joffer Educado (PHI), Erlindo Eusebio (PHI)
September 8; 1:30 pm	(10–25, 15–25, 15–25); P2			Smart Araneta Coliseum, Quezon City; Attendance: 531; Referees: Joffer Educado (PHI), Erlindo Eusebio (PHI)
September 8; 1:30 pm	Scoring leaders			Smart Araneta Coliseum, Quezon City; Attendance: 531; Referees: Joffer Educado (PHI), Erlindo Eusebio (PHI)
Dang T.K.T. (8/48)		Total	Molina (14/45)
Dang T.K.T. (8/32)		Attack	2 players, 13 each
-		Block	Meneses (4/6)
3 players, 1 each		Serve	4 players, 1 each

==== Third place match ====
September 8; 4:00 pm	Creamline Cool Smashers	1–3	PLDT High Speed Hitters	Smart Araneta Coliseum, Quezon City; Attendance: 1,575; Referees: Fernando Velarde (PHI), Vincent Ryan Corpuz (PHI)
September 8; 4:00 pm	(20–25, 25–20, 21–25, 22–25); P2			Smart Araneta Coliseum, Quezon City; Attendance: 1,575; Referees: Fernando Velarde (PHI), Vincent Ryan Corpuz (PHI)
September 8; 4:00 pm	Scoring leaders			Smart Araneta Coliseum, Quezon City; Attendance: 1,575; Referees: Fernando Velarde (PHI), Vincent Ryan Corpuz (PHI)
Santiago-Minowa (19/79)		Total	Davison (29/93)
Galanza (14/54)		Attack	Davison (26/63)
Santiago-Minowa (3/35)		Block	Dy (2/16)
Santiago-Minowa (3/15)		Serve	Davison (3/22)

==== Finals ====
September 8; 6:30 pm	Nxled Chameleons	0–3	Est Cola	Smart Araneta Coliseum, Quezon City; Attendance: 1,975; Referees: Patrick Castillo (PHI), Joffer Educado (PHI)
September 8; 6:30 pm	(22–25, 21–25, 19–25); P2			Smart Araneta Coliseum, Quezon City; Attendance: 1,975; Referees: Patrick Castillo (PHI), Joffer Educado (PHI)
September 8; 6:30 pm	Scoring leaders			Smart Araneta Coliseum, Quezon City; Attendance: 1,975; Referees: Patrick Castillo (PHI), Joffer Educado (PHI)
Sabete-Escamillan (11/58)		Total	Phontham P. (15/59)
Sabete-Escamillan (9/34)		Attack	Phontham P. (14/38)
Phillips (3/15)		Block	Jatta S. (3/12)
Pablo (2/7)		Serve	Moonjakham N. (2/14)

=== Final standing ===
Rank	Team
1st place, gold medalist(s)	Est Cola
2nd place, silver medalist(s)	Nxled Chameleons
3rd place, bronze medalist(s)	PLDT High Speed Hitters
4	Creamline Cool Smashers
5	Farm Fresh Foxies
6	Ho Chi Minh City

=== Awards ===
This is the first conference in which the league didn't award a Finals Most Valuable Player, as only the Conference MVP was given out.

Individual awards

Award	Player	Team	Ref.
Conference Most Valuable Player	Papatchaya Phontham	Est Cola	
Best Outside Hitters	Savi Davison	PLDT	
Best Outside Hitters	Jonah Sabete	Nxled	
Best Middle Blockers	MJ Phillips	Nxled	
Best Middle Blockers	Jaja Santiago	Creamline	
Best Opposite Hitter	Papatchaya Phontham	Est Cola	
Best Setter	Gel Cayuna	Nxled	
Best Libero	Kath Arado	PLDT	

== All-Filipino Conference ==
The second conference of the 2026–27 Premier Volleyball League season and the 11th running of the All-Filipino Conference. The tournament began on October 10, 2026 and will end sometime in April 2027.

The conference is split into three series, with the first two series featuring traditional formats while the third series will be a final playoff tournament where the league will declare its first-ever season champion, dubbed the "Philippine Grand Champion". Due to the larger scope of this conference, it is also expected to be the only regular tournament of the season as the prior Invitational Conference was part of the preseason.

This conference also see integration with the 2026–27 Spikers' Turf season, with matches of the men's league scheduled in between PVL matches.

=== Preliminary round ===
==== Standings ====
Pos	Team	Pld	W	L	Pts	SW	SL	SR	SPW	SPL	SPR	Qualification
1	Nxled Chameleons	8	8	0	23	24	6	4.000	713	608	1.173	Twice-to-beat in semifinals
2	Creamline Cool Smashers	8	5	3	16	19	11	1.727	701	641	1.094	Twice-to-beat in semifinals
3	Choco Mucho Flying Titans	8	5	3	15	20	15	1.333	783	736	1.064	Twice-to-win in semifinals
4	Farm Fresh Foxies	8	5	3	14	19	16	1.188	758	755	1.004	Twice-to-win in semifinals
5	PLDT High Speed Hitters	8	4	4	13	15	15	1.000	677	666	1.017	
6	Akari Chargers	8	3	5	9	14	19	0.737	724	745	0.972	
7	Capital1 Solar Spikers	8	3	5	7	13	21	0.619	720	761	0.946	
8	Zus Coffee Thunderbelles	8	2	6	7	12	21	0.571	676	734	0.921	
9	Galeries Tower Highrisers	8	1	7	4	11	23	0.478	683	789	0.866	

Source: Premier Volleyball League

== Conference results ==
Conference		Champion	Runner-up	3rd	4th	5th	6th	7th	8th	9th
Invitational		Est Cola	Nxled	PLDT	Creamline	Farm Fresh	Ho Chi Minh City	—N/a		
All-Filipino	Siklab series	To be determined				PLDT	Akari	Capital1	Zus Coffee	Galeries Towers
All-Filipino	Sigla series	To be determined								
All-Filipino	Sinag series (championship)	To be determined								

== Media Coverage ==
On September 15, 2026, the league announced a renewal of Cignal TV's broadcast rights for three years, making this season the sixth consecutive season of their partnership which will last through the 2028–29 season.

== Notable events ==
=== Off-season ===
- On April 28, 2026, the Cignal Super Spikers took a leave of absence after five seasons in the league.

=== Invitational Conference ===
- On September 8, 2026, Est Cola beat the Nxled Chameleons in the finals of the 2026 Invitational Conference to become the second guest team to win a PVL title after the Kurashiki Ablaze in 2023. Papatchaya Phontham won MVP, becoming the first non-Filipino player to win the award.

=== All-Filipino Conference ===
==== Siklab series ====
- On October 10, 2026, 19,106 spectators attended the match between the Creamline Cool Smashers and Akari Chargers at SM Seaside Cebu Arena, which set the arena's attendace record three months since its opening in July.
