= 2026 Premier Volleyball League Invitational Conference =

Volleyball tournament in the Philippines

- Duration: August 31 – September 8, 2026
- Teams: 6
- Matches: 18
- TV partner(s): One Sports; One Sports+
- Streaming partner(s): Cignal Play; One Sports YouTube Channel

Results
- Champions: Est Cola
- Runners-up: Nxled Chameleons
- Third place: PLDT High Speed Hitters
- Fourth place: Creamline Cool Smashers

Awards
- Conference MVP: Papatchaya Phontham
- Best OH: Savi Davison; Jonah Sabete-Escamillan
- Best MB: Jaja Santiago-Minowa; MJ Phillips
- Best OPP: Papatchaya Phontham
- Best Setter: Gel Cayuna
- Best Libero: Kath Arado

PVL Invitational Conference chronology
- < 2025 2027 >

PVL conference chronology
- < 2026 All-Filipino 2026–27 All-Filipino >
- < 2026 PVL on Tour (preseason)

The 2026 Premier Volleyball League Invitational Conference was the first conference of the 2026–27 Premier Volleyball League season and the fifth running of the Invitational Conference. The tournament ran from August 31 to September 8, 2026. This tournament is also part of a larger preseason which also included the 2026 PVL on Tour.

Thai guest team Est Cola swept the Nxled Chameleons in the final match to win the PVL championship, becoming the second guest team to do so after Japan's Kurashiki Ablaze in the 2023 edition. The PLDT High Speed Hitters rounded out the podium after defeating the Creamline Cool Smashers in the third place match.

== Qualification ==
Since 2024, the Invitational Conference is a conference where only a selection of PVL teams can compete against guest teams from other countries. For 2026, the four highest-ranked still-active teams from the 2026 All-Filipino Conference qualified for this conference. Those teams were the Creamline Cool Smashers (1st), PLDT High Speed Hitters (3rd), Farm Fresh Foxies (4th), and Nxled Chameleons (5th). The second place team, the Cignal Super Spikers, left the league during the off-season.

This conference's two guest teams are Ho Chi Minh City from Vietnam and Est Cola from Thailand. The debuting Ho Chi Minh City team had previously competed in the 2026 Shakey's Super League National Invitationals, fielding a roster of younger Vietnamese players, while Est Cola will make their second PVL appearance. During Est Cola's previous appearance in 2024, the team fielded a roster of under-20 Thai players and finished fourth in the conference.

The Philippine women's national team was invited by the PVL to take part in the conference. However, the invite was withdrawn after the league organizers were advised against it after learning about a FIVB regulations relating to national teams participation in club tournaments. Alas Pilipinas can only participate as a club under the name "All-Star Team of the Philippines".

== Participating teams ==
2026 Premier Volleyball League Invitational Conference
Abbr.	Team	Affiliation	Head coach	Team captain
Local teams
CCS	Creamline Cool Smashers	Republic Biscuit Corporation	(Philippines) Sherwin Meneses	(Philippines) Alyssa Valdez
FFF	Farm Fresh Foxies	Farm Fresh Philippine International / Strong Group Athletics	(Japan) Koji Tsuzurabara	(Philippines) Louie Romero
NXL	Nxled Chameleons	Akari Lighting & Technology	(Italy) Ettore Guidetti	(Philippines) Brooke Van Sickle
HSH	PLDT High Speed Hitters	PLDT Inc.	(Philippines) Rald Ricafort	(Philippines) Kath Arado
Foreign guest teams
EST	Est Cola	Sermsuk Public Co. Ltd. (Thailand)	(Thailand) Wanna Buakaew	(Thailand) Kantima Aekpatcha
HVF	Ho Chi Minh City	Ho Chi Minh City Volleyball Federation / National A-League (Vietnam)	(Vietnam) Trần Hiền	(Vietnam) Thi Kim Thanh Dang

== Venue ==
All games will be played at the Araneta Coliseum.

Quezon City
Araneta Coliseum
Capacity: 15,000
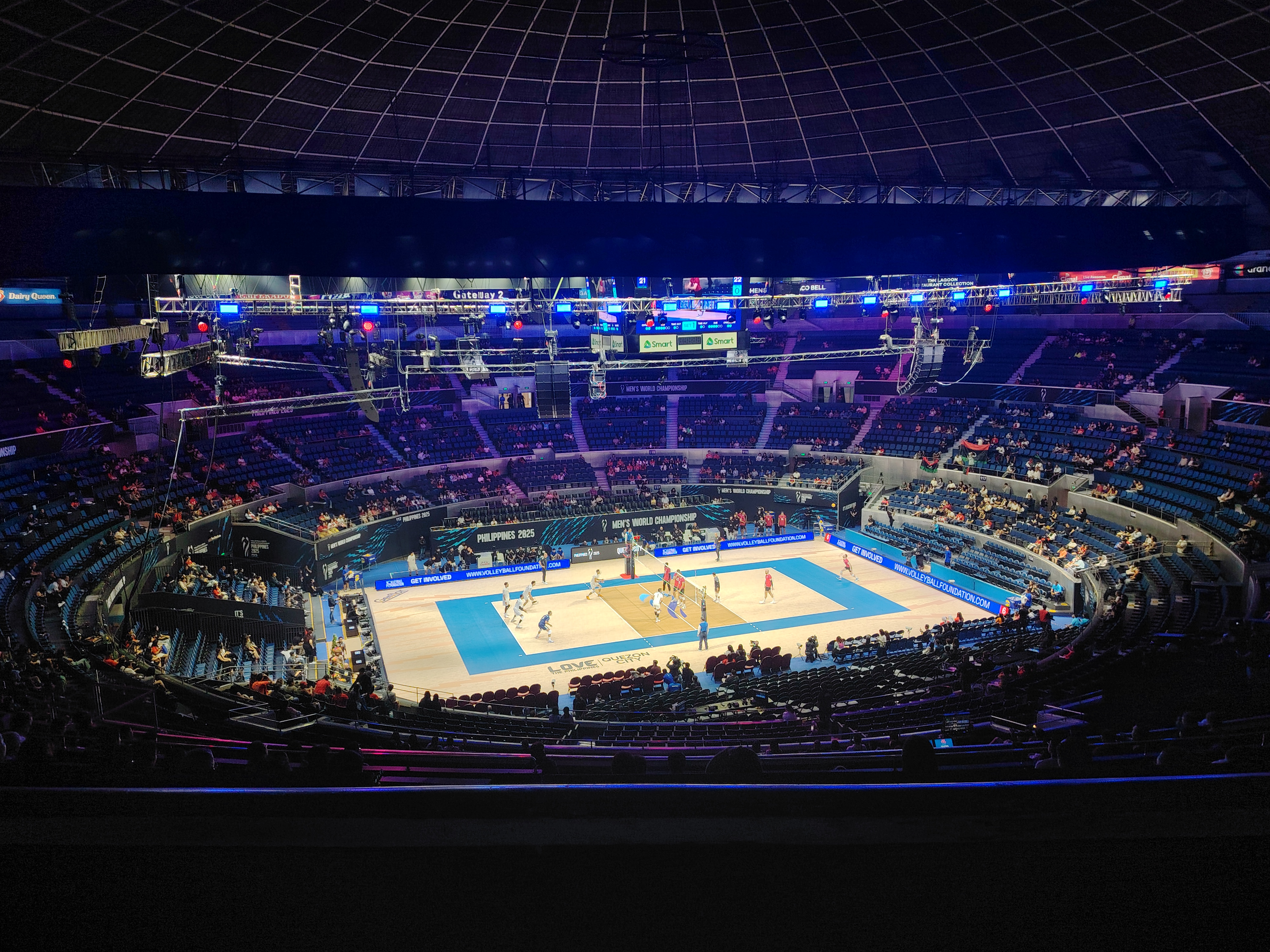

== Transactions ==
=== National team players ===
Players who have commitments with the Philippines women's national team will be excluded from taking part in this conference.

== Format ==
The following format will be conducted for the entirety of the conference:

=== Preliminary round ===
- The preliminary round is a single round-robin tournament, with each team playing one match against all other teams for a total of five matches. Teams are ranked using the FIVB Ranking System.
- The top two teams will advance to the championship match while teams ranked third and fourth will play in the third-place match.
- Teams ranked fifth and sixth will play in the classification match.

=== Finals ===
- The championship (gold medal), third-place (bronze medal) and fifth place (classification) matches will be singular matches.
- The match-ups will be as follows:
  - Championship match: 1st ranked team vs. 2nd ranked team
  - Third-place match: 3rd ranked team vs. 4th ranked team
  - Fifth-place match: 5th ranked team vs. 6th ranked team

== Pool standing procedure ==
- First, teams are ranked by the number of matches won.
- If the number of matches won is tied, the tied teams are then ranked by match points, wherein:
  - Match won 3–0 or 3–1: 3 match points for the winner, 0 match points for the loser.
  - Match won 3–2: 2 match points for the winner, 1 match point for the loser.
- In case of any further ties, the following criteria shall be used:
  - Set ratio: the number of sets won divided by number of sets lost.
  - Point ratio: the number of points scored divided by the number of points allowed.
  - Head-to-head standings: any remaining tied teams are ranked based on the results of head-to-head matches involving the teams in question.

== Preliminary round ==
=== Standings ===
Pos	Team	Pld	W	L	Pts	SW	SL	SR	SPW	SPL	SPR	Qualification
1	Est Cola	5	4	1	11	13	6	2.167	439	434	1.012	Finals
2	Nxled Chameleons	5	3	2	10	12	8	1.500	476	452	1.053	Finals
3	Creamline Cool Smashers	5	3	2	9	12	9	1.333	480	426	1.127	Third place match
4	PLDT High Speed Hitters	5	3	2	8	10	10	1.000	457	437	1.046	Third place match
5	Farm Fresh Foxies	5	1	4	4	7	13	0.538	426	455	0.936	Fifth place match
6	Ho Chi Minh City	5	1	4	3	5	13	0.385	373	447	0.834	Fifth place match

Source: Premier Volleyball League

=== Results table ===
Team	Game				
Team	1	2	3	4	5
Creamline (CCS)	NXL; 3–1	HVF; 3–0	FFF; 3–2	EST; 1–3	HSH; 2–3
Farm Fresh (FFF)	HVF; 3–1	EST; 0–3	CCS; 2–3	HSH; 1–3	NXL; 1–3
Nxled (NXL)	CCS; 1–3	HSH; 3–0	EST; 2–3	HVF; 3–1	FFF; 3–1
PLDT (HSH)	EST; 3–1	NXL; 0–3	HVF; 1–3	FFF; 3–1	CCS; 3–2
Est Cola (EST)	HSH; 1–3	FFF; 3–0	NXL; 3–2	CCS; 3–1	HVF; 3–0
Ho Chi Minh City (HVF)	FFF; 1–3	CCS; 0–3	HSH; 3–1	NXL; 1–3	EST; 0–3

Source: Premier Volleyball League
Legend: Blue = win; Red = loss

=== Match details ===
- All times are Philippine Standard Time (UTC+8:00).

August 31; 1:30 pm	Est Cola	1–3	PLDT High Speed Hitters	Smart Araneta Coliseum, Quezon City; Attendance: 2,350; Referees: Patrick Castillo (PHI), Justine Navidad (PHI)
August 31; 1:30 pm	(23–25, 15–25, 28–26, 14–25); P2			Smart Araneta Coliseum, Quezon City; Attendance: 2,350; Referees: Patrick Castillo (PHI), Justine Navidad (PHI)
August 31; 1:30 pm	Scoring leaders			Smart Araneta Coliseum, Quezon City; Attendance: 2,350; Referees: Patrick Castillo (PHI), Justine Navidad (PHI)
Srikuta N. (14/55)		Total	Davison (30/98)
Srikuta N. (10/39)		Attack	Davison (24/65)
Wasan N. (3/9)		Block	Reyes (6/26)
Srikuta N. (4/13)		Serve	2 players, 1 each

August 31; 4:00 pm	Nxled Chameleons	1–3	Creamline Cool Smashers	Smart Araneta Coliseum, Quezon City; Attendance: 2,725; Referees: Fernando Velarde (PHI), Roberto Celso (PHI)
August 31; 4:00 pm	(20–25, 23–25, 25–23, 20–25); P2			Smart Araneta Coliseum, Quezon City; Attendance: 2,725; Referees: Fernando Velarde (PHI), Roberto Celso (PHI)
August 31; 4:00 pm	Scoring leaders			Smart Araneta Coliseum, Quezon City; Attendance: 2,725; Referees: Fernando Velarde (PHI), Roberto Celso (PHI)
Sabete-Escamillan (20/80)		Total	Santiago-Minowa (19/69)
Sabete-Escamillan (18/56)		Attack	Santiago-Minowa (17/30)
Phillips (3/22)		Block	6 players, 1 each
Cariño (2/19)		Serve	3 players, 1 each

August 31; 6:30 pm	Ho Chi Minh City	1–3	Farm Fresh Foxies	Smart Araneta Coliseum, Quezon City; Attendance: 2,700; Referees: Jocelyn Del Rosario (PHI), Justine Navidad (PHI)
August 31; 6:30 pm	(14–25, 15–25, 28–26, 20–25); P2			Smart Araneta Coliseum, Quezon City; Attendance: 2,700; Referees: Jocelyn Del Rosario (PHI), Justine Navidad (PHI)
August 31; 6:30 pm	Scoring leaders			Smart Araneta Coliseum, Quezon City; Attendance: 2,700; Referees: Jocelyn Del Rosario (PHI), Justine Navidad (PHI)
Nguyen T.N.P. (13/74)		Total	Tubu (25/73)
Nguyen T.N.P. (12/48)		Attack	Tubu (24/47)
2 players, 2 each		Block	Meneses (5/25)
-		Serve	Meneses (2/19)

September 1; 1:30 pm	PLDT High Speed Hitters	0–3	Nxled Chameleons	Smart Araneta Coliseum, Quezon City; Attendance: 370; Referees: Joffer Educado (PHI), Philip Racelis (PHI)
September 1; 1:30 pm	(19–25, 22–25, 20–25); P2			Smart Araneta Coliseum, Quezon City; Attendance: 370; Referees: Joffer Educado (PHI), Philip Racelis (PHI)
September 1; 1:30 pm	Scoring leaders			Smart Araneta Coliseum, Quezon City; Attendance: 370; Referees: Joffer Educado (PHI), Philip Racelis (PHI)
Davison (20/66)		Total	Phillips (13/44)
Davison (19/52)		Attack	De Guzman (10/32)
4 players, 1 each		Block	Pablo (3/10)
Reyes (1/7)		Serve	Phillips (4/16)

September 1; 4:00 pm	Farm Fresh Foxies	0–3	Est Cola	Smart Araneta Coliseum, Quezon City; Attendance: 606; Referees: Erlindo Eusebio (PHI), Ryan Vincent Corpuz (PHI)
September 1; 4:00 pm	(21–25, 16–25, 22–25); P2			Smart Araneta Coliseum, Quezon City; Attendance: 606; Referees: Erlindo Eusebio (PHI), Ryan Vincent Corpuz (PHI)
September 1; 4:00 pm	Scoring leaders			Smart Araneta Coliseum, Quezon City; Attendance: 606; Referees: Erlindo Eusebio (PHI), Ryan Vincent Corpuz (PHI)
Tubu (15/45)		Total	Phontham P. (17/57)
Tubu (15/32)		Attack	Phontham P. (13/29)
Galang (3/7)		Block	Saelao N. (4/9)
Meneses (2/9)		Serve	Phontham P. (3/21)

September 1; 6:30 pm	Creamline Cool Smashers	3–0	Ho Chi Minh City	Smart Araneta Coliseum, Quezon City; Attendance: 836; Referees: Joven Racelis (PHI), Philip Ricahuerta (PHI)
September 1; 6:30 pm	(25–18, 25–16, 25–6); P2			Smart Araneta Coliseum, Quezon City; Attendance: 836; Referees: Joven Racelis (PHI), Philip Ricahuerta (PHI)
September 1; 6:30 pm	Scoring leaders			Smart Araneta Coliseum, Quezon City; Attendance: 836; Referees: Joven Racelis (PHI), Philip Ricahuerta (PHI)
Santiago-Minowa (12/32)		Total	Dang T.K.T. (8/44)
Carlos (11/24)		Attack	Dang T.K.T. (6/23)
2 players, 3 each		Block	Dao T.N. (2/10)
5 players, 1 each		Serve	3 players, 1 each

September 3; 1:30 pm	Farm Fresh Foxies	2–3	Creamline Cool Smashers	Smart Araneta Coliseum, Quezon City; Attendance: 850; Referees: Erlindo Eusebio (PHI), Fernando Velarde (PHI)
September 3; 1:30 pm	(18–25, 26–24, 22–25, 25–23, 4–15); P2			Smart Araneta Coliseum, Quezon City; Attendance: 850; Referees: Erlindo Eusebio (PHI), Fernando Velarde (PHI)
September 3; 1:30 pm	Scoring leaders			Smart Araneta Coliseum, Quezon City; Attendance: 850; Referees: Erlindo Eusebio (PHI), Fernando Velarde (PHI)
Molina (27/86)		Total	Galanza (26/82)
Molina (25/59)		Attack	Galanza (22/57)
Tubu (4/11)		Block	Santiago-Minowa (3/24)
Tubino (1/9)		Serve	2 players, 2 each

September 3; 4:00 pm	Ho Chi Minh City	3–1	PLDT High Speed Hitters	Smart Araneta Coliseum, Quezon City; Attendance: 832; Referees: Philip Ricahuerta (PHI), Fernando Velarde (PHI)
September 3; 4:00 pm	(28–26, 19–25, 25–21, 25–16); P2			Smart Araneta Coliseum, Quezon City; Attendance: 832; Referees: Philip Ricahuerta (PHI), Fernando Velarde (PHI)
September 3; 4:00 pm	Scoring leaders			Smart Araneta Coliseum, Quezon City; Attendance: 832; Referees: Philip Ricahuerta (PHI), Fernando Velarde (PHI)
Dang T.K.T. (19/68)		Total	Dy (25/69)
Dang T.K.T. (17/40)		Attack	Dy (22/38)
Le T.M.X. (5/21)		Block	2 players, 2 each
2 players, 2 each		Serve	5 players, 1 each

September 3; 6:30 pm	Est Cola	3–2	Nxled Chameleons	Smart Araneta Coliseum, Quezon City; Attendance: 741; Referees: Bobby Celso (PHI), Joven Racelis (PHI)
September 3; 6:30 pm	(26–24, 21–25, 21–25, 30–28, 15–12); P2			Smart Araneta Coliseum, Quezon City; Attendance: 741; Referees: Bobby Celso (PHI), Joven Racelis (PHI)
September 3; 6:30 pm	Scoring leaders			Smart Araneta Coliseum, Quezon City; Attendance: 741; Referees: Bobby Celso (PHI), Joven Racelis (PHI)
Phontham P. (26/111)		Total	Sabete-Escamillan (26/97)
Phontham P. (23/71)		Attack	Sabete-Escamillan (15/56)
2 players, 2 each		Block	2 players, 6 each
Moonjakham P. (5/30)		Serve	Sabete-Escamillan (5/25)

September 4; 1:30 pm	PLDT High Speed Hitters	3–1	Farm Fresh Foxies	Smart Araneta Coliseum, Quezon City; Attendance: 397; Referees: Fernando Velarde (PHI), Jocelyn Del Rosario (PHI)
September 4; 1:30 pm	(25–16, 25–22, 23–25, 25–20); P2			Smart Araneta Coliseum, Quezon City; Attendance: 397; Referees: Fernando Velarde (PHI), Jocelyn Del Rosario (PHI)
September 4; 1:30 pm	Scoring leaders			Smart Araneta Coliseum, Quezon City; Attendance: 397; Referees: Fernando Velarde (PHI), Jocelyn Del Rosario (PHI)
Davison (32/96)		Total	Molina (12/81)
Davison (28/68)		Attack	Tubino (11/49)
2 players, 4 each		Block	2 players, 3 each
2 players, 2 each		Serve	3 players, 1 each

September 4; 4:00 pm	Nxled Chameleons	3–1	Ho Chi Minh City	Smart Araneta Coliseum, Quezon City; Attendance: 1,001; Referees: Joffer Educado (PHI), Justine Navidad (PHI)
September 4; 4:00 pm	(25–20, 31–33, 25–17, 25–22); P2			Smart Araneta Coliseum, Quezon City; Attendance: 1,001; Referees: Joffer Educado (PHI), Justine Navidad (PHI)
September 4; 4:00 pm	Scoring leaders			Smart Araneta Coliseum, Quezon City; Attendance: 1,001; Referees: Joffer Educado (PHI), Justine Navidad (PHI)
Pablo (18/73)		Total	Dang T.K.T. (15/75)
Cariño (16/53)		Attack	Dang T.K.T. (14/49)
Pablo (5/18)		Block	Dao T.N. (3/25)
5 players, 1 each		Serve	Truong M.K. (3/12)

September 4; 6:30 pm	Creamline Cool Smashers	1–3	Est Cola	Smart Araneta Coliseum, Quezon City; Attendance: 1,621; Referees: Jocelyn Del Rosario (PHI), Erlindo Eusebio (PHI)
September 4; 6:30 pm	(25–17, 21–25, 22–25, 25–27); P2			Smart Araneta Coliseum, Quezon City; Attendance: 1,621; Referees: Jocelyn Del Rosario (PHI), Erlindo Eusebio (PHI)
September 4; 6:30 pm	Scoring leaders			Smart Araneta Coliseum, Quezon City; Attendance: 1,621; Referees: Jocelyn Del Rosario (PHI), Erlindo Eusebio (PHI)
Santiago-Minowa (19/58)		Total	Phontham P. (27/91)
Santiago-Minowa (15/26)		Attack	Phontham P. (24/64)
Valdez (4/13)		Block	Moonjakham P. (3/9)
Panaga (3/18)		Serve	3 players, 1 each

September 6; 1:30 pm	Farm Fresh Foxies	1–3	Nxled Chameleons	Smart Araneta Coliseum, Quezon City; Attendance: 2,400; Referees: Fernando Velarde (PHI), Justine Navidad (PHI)
September 6; 1:30 pm	(20–25, 21–25, 25–18, 22–25); P2			Smart Araneta Coliseum, Quezon City; Attendance: 2,400; Referees: Fernando Velarde (PHI), Justine Navidad (PHI)
September 6; 1:30 pm	Scoring leaders			Smart Araneta Coliseum, Quezon City; Attendance: 2,400; Referees: Fernando Velarde (PHI), Justine Navidad (PHI)
Tubu (20/65)		Total	Phillips (25/65)
Tubu (17/42)		Attack	Phillips (19/30)
Tubu (3/12)		Block	Sabete-Escamillan (3/17)
Perdido (1/8)		Serve	Phillips (4/17)

September 6; 4:00 pm	Est Cola	3–0	Ho Chi Minh City	Smart Araneta Coliseum, Quezon City; Attendance: 2,507; Referees: Patrick Castillo (PHI), Roberto Celso (PHI)
September 6; 4:00 pm	(25–19, 26–24, 26–24); P2			Smart Araneta Coliseum, Quezon City; Attendance: 2,507; Referees: Patrick Castillo (PHI), Roberto Celso (PHI)
September 6; 4:00 pm	Scoring leaders			Smart Araneta Coliseum, Quezon City; Attendance: 2,507; Referees: Patrick Castillo (PHI), Roberto Celso (PHI)
Phontham P. (21/63)		Total	Dang T.K.T. (14/57)
Phontham P. (19/45)		Attack	Dang T.K.T. (9/35)
Wasan N. (3/16)		Block	Dang T.K.T. (2/11)
Moonjakham N. (4/15)		Serve	Dang T.K.T. (3/11)

September 6; 6:30 pm	PLDT High Speed Hitters	3–2	Creamline Cool Smashers	Smart Araneta Coliseum, Quezon City; Attendance: 4,081; Referees: Erlindo Eusebio (PHI), Justine Navidad (PHI)
September 6; 6:30 pm	(25–17, 23–25, 21–25, 25–23, 15–12); P2			Smart Araneta Coliseum, Quezon City; Attendance: 4,081; Referees: Erlindo Eusebio (PHI), Justine Navidad (PHI)
September 6; 6:30 pm	Scoring leaders			Smart Araneta Coliseum, Quezon City; Attendance: 4,081; Referees: Erlindo Eusebio (PHI), Justine Navidad (PHI)
Davison (37/102)		Total	Santiago-Minowa (25/90)
Davison (35/81)		Attack	Galanza (19/66)
Reyes (5/25)		Block	Santiago-Minowa (9/35)
3 players, 1 each		Serve	de Leon (2/15)

== Final matches ==
=== Fifth place match ===
September 8; 1:30 pm	Ho Chi Minh City	0–3	Farm Fresh Foxies	Smart Araneta Coliseum, Quezon City; Attendance: 531; Referees: Joffer Educado (PHI), Erlindo Eusebio (PHI)
September 8; 1:30 pm	(10–25, 15–25, 15–25); P2			Smart Araneta Coliseum, Quezon City; Attendance: 531; Referees: Joffer Educado (PHI), Erlindo Eusebio (PHI)
September 8; 1:30 pm	Scoring leaders			Smart Araneta Coliseum, Quezon City; Attendance: 531; Referees: Joffer Educado (PHI), Erlindo Eusebio (PHI)
Dang T.K.T. (8/48)		Total	Molina (14/45)
Dang T.K.T. (8/32)		Attack	2 players, 13 each
-		Block	Meneses (4/6)
3 players, 1 each		Serve	4 players, 1 each

=== Third place match ===
September 8; 4:00 pm	Creamline Cool Smashers	1–3	PLDT High Speed Hitters	Smart Araneta Coliseum, Quezon City; Attendance: 1,575; Referees: Fernando Velarde (PHI), Vincent Ryan Corpuz (PHI)
September 8; 4:00 pm	(20–25, 25–20, 21–25, 22–25); P2			Smart Araneta Coliseum, Quezon City; Attendance: 1,575; Referees: Fernando Velarde (PHI), Vincent Ryan Corpuz (PHI)
September 8; 4:00 pm	Scoring leaders			Smart Araneta Coliseum, Quezon City; Attendance: 1,575; Referees: Fernando Velarde (PHI), Vincent Ryan Corpuz (PHI)
Santiago-Minowa (19/79)		Total	Davison (29/93)
Galanza (14/54)		Attack	Davison (26/63)
Santiago-Minowa (3/35)		Block	Dy (2/16)
Santiago-Minowa (3/15)		Serve	Davison (3/22)

=== Finals ===
September 8; 6:30 pm	Nxled Chameleons	0–3	Est Cola	Smart Araneta Coliseum, Quezon City; Attendance: 1,975; Referees: Patrick Castillo (PHI), Joffer Educado (PHI)
September 8; 6:30 pm	(22–25, 21–25, 19–25); P2			Smart Araneta Coliseum, Quezon City; Attendance: 1,975; Referees: Patrick Castillo (PHI), Joffer Educado (PHI)
September 8; 6:30 pm	Scoring leaders			Smart Araneta Coliseum, Quezon City; Attendance: 1,975; Referees: Patrick Castillo (PHI), Joffer Educado (PHI)
Sabete-Escamillan (11/58)		Total	Phontham P. (15/59)
Sabete-Escamillan (9/34)		Attack	Phontham P. (14/38)
Phillips (3/15)		Block	Jatta S. (3/12)
Pablo (2/7)		Serve	Moonjakham N. (2/14)

== Final standings ==
Rank	Team
1st place, gold medalist(s)	Est Cola
2nd place, silver medalist(s)	Nxled Chameleons
3rd place, bronze medalist(s)	PLDT High Speed Hitters
4	Creamline Cool Smashers
5	Farm Fresh Foxies
6	Ho Chi Minh City

2026 PVL Invitational champions
Est Cola
First title

Team roster
Kantima Aekpatcha (c), Jiratcha Naoprachun, Nichakorn Wansuk, Natnicha Saelao, Serah Ankomah, Nattharika Wasan, Papatchaya Phontham, Waruni Kanram, Nannaphat Moonjakham, Wisaruta Sengna, Sasithorn Jatta, Ritwiset Chuleeporn, Supawadee Panwilai, Nirarach Srikuta
Head coach
Wanna Buakaew

== Awards and medalists ==
This is the first conference in which the league didn't award a Finals Most Valuable Player, as only the Conference MVP was given out.

Individual awards

Award	Player	Team	Ref.
Conference Most Valuable Player	Papatchaya Phontham	Est Cola	
Best Outside Hitters	Savi Davison	PLDT	
Best Outside Hitters	Jonah Sabete	Nxled	
Best Middle Blockers	MJ Phillips	Nxled	
Best Middle Blockers	Jaja Santiago	Creamline	
Best Opposite Hitter	Papatchaya Phontham	Est Cola	
Best Setter	Gel Cayuna	Nxled	
Best Libero	Kath Arado	PLDT	

Medalists

Gold	Silver	Bronze
Est Cola: Kantima Aekpatcha (c); Jiratcha Naoprachun (L); Nichakorn Wansuk (L); Natnicha Saelao; Serah Ankomah; Nattharika Wasan; Papatchaya Phontham; Waruni Kanram; Nannaphat Moonjakham; Wisaruta Sengna; Sasithorn Jatta; Ritwiset Chuleeporn; Supawadee Panwilai; Nirarach Srikuta	Nxled Chameleons: Brooke Van Sickle (c); Bang Pineda; Djanel Cheng; EJ Laure-Cariño; Jules Tolentino; Irah Jaboneta (L); Krich Macaslang; Myla Pablo; Chiara Permentilla; Jackie Acuña; MJ Phillips; Ranya Musa; Lyann De Guzman; Jovelyn Fernandez; Jonah Sabete-Escamillan; Gel Cayuna; Aduke Ogunsanya; Jellie Tempiatura (L); Aby Maraño	PLDT High Speed Hitters: Kath Arado (c) (L); Maria Nieza Viray (L); Shiela Mae Kiseo; Mika Reyes; Winnie Bedaña; Alleiah Jan Lina Malaluan; Savi Davison; Seth Rodriguez; Kim Fajardo; Majoy Baron; Kim Kianna Dy; Fianne Ariola; Dell Palomata; Kiesha Dazzie Bedonia; Jessa Ordiales; Angelica Alcantara; Joan Monares; Jessey Laine de Leon; Jovie Prado; Leila Cruz
Head coach: Wanna Buakaew	Head coach: Ettore Guidetti	Head coach: Rald Ricafort
