= 2024–25 Nxled Chameleons season =

Filipino women's volleyball team season

The 2024–25 Nxled Chameleons season was the second season of the Nxled Chameleons in the Premier Volleyball League (PVL).

On October 20, 2024, Nxled named Ettore Guidetti as the team's new head coach, replacing Chen Gang. Ahead of the All-Filipino Conference, Trisha Genesis ddeparted for the Capital1 Solar Spikers, while EJ Laure joined the team from the Chery Tiggo Crossovers. Nxled only earned one win and four points in eleven matches during the preliminary round, and were then swept by the Creamline Cool Smashers, which brought the team to the play-in tournament. The team finished with a 1–1 record and three points during the round, ranked second in Pool B and didn't make the final round.

== Roster ==
Nxled Chameleons
No.	Player	Position	Height	Birth date	Alma Mater
2	(Philippines) Lycha Ebon	Opposite Hitter	1.70 m (5 ft 7 in)	October 23, 1999 (age 27)	FEU
3	(Philippines) Ennajie Laure	Outside hitter	1.75 m (5 ft 9 in)	July 31, 1997 (age 29)	UST
4	(Philippines) Ivy Jisel Perez	Setter	1.74 m (5 ft 9 in)	February 13, 1995 (age 31)	NU
5	(Philippines) (Canada) Rachel Jorvina	Libero	1.64 m (5 ft 5 in)	April 19, 1998 (age 28)	MacEwan
6	(Philippines) Lia Pelaga	Middle Blocker	1.79 m (5 ft 10 in)	June 5, 2002 (age 24)	UE
7	(Philippines) Krich Macaslang	Middle Blocker	1.83 m (6 ft 0 in)	January 25, 2000 (age 26)	AdU
8	(Philippines) May Luna	Outside Hitter	1.65 m (5 ft 5 in)	August 2, 1992 (age 34)	DLSU
9	(Philippines) Chiara Permentilla (C)	Outside Hitter	1.73 m (5 ft 8 in)	November 26, 1997 (age 28)	AdU
11	(Philippines) Razel Aldea	Opposite Spiker	1.69 m (5 ft 7 in)	August 29, 1999 (age 27)	UPSHD
14	(Philippines) Jaycel Delos Reyes	Middle Blocker	1.78 m (5 ft 10 in)	July 14, 1999 (age 27)	Ateneo
15	(Philippines) Jai Atienza	Middle Blocker	1.80 m (5 ft 11 in)	November 9, 1999 (age 26)	UP
17	(Philippines) Lucille Almonte	Outside hitter	1.73 m (5 ft 8 in)	January 25, 2001 (age 25)	AdU
18	(Philippines) Janel Maraguinot	Setter	1.60 m (5 ft 3 in)	July 18, 2000 (age 26)	ADMU
22	(Philippines) Mary Anne Esguerra	Middle Blocker	1.80 m (5 ft 11 in)	October 15, 1993 (age 33)	AU
24	(Philippines) Maji Mangulabnan	Setter	1.64 m (5 ft 5 in)	March 24, 1999 (age 27)	UST
25	(Philippines) Bang Pineda	Libero	1.60 m (5 ft 3 in)	January 21, 1991 (age 35)	AdU

Coaching staff

- Head coach:
  Ettore Guidetti
- Assistant coaches:
  Raffy Mosuela
  Lorden Tiu
  Ronchette Lee Villegas
  Rhenzie Hu
  Tina Salak

Team staff

- Team manager:
  Ronnie Magsanoc
- Utility:
  Jerry Agaton

Medical staff

- Strength & conditioning coach:
  Chi Dungo
- Physical therapist:
  Shane Co

== 2024 All-Filipino Conference ==
=== Preliminary round ===
==== Standings ====
Pos	Team	Pld	W	L	Pts	SW	SL	SR	SPW	SPL	SPR
6	Cignal HD Spikers	11	7	4	22	23	14	1.643	869	747	1.163
7	Akari Chargers	11	5	6	15	17	18	0.944	767	750	1.023
8	Nxled Chameleons	11	4	7	11	14	23	0.609	794	824	0.964
9	Farm Fresh Foxies	11	3	8	11	14	24	0.583	785	863	0.910
10	Galeries Tower Highrisers	11	3	8	9	11	26	0.423	689	832	0.828

Source: TeamPilipinas.info

==== Match log ====
2024 PVL All-Filipino Conference preliminary round match log
Total: 4–7 (11 points)
February: 0–2 (0 points)

Match	Date	Opponent	Sets	Total	Location Attendance	Record	Pts	Report
1	February 22, 2024	Choco Mucho	0–3	52–75	Filoil EcoOil Centre; 1,335	0–1	0	P2
2	February 27, 2024	PLDT	0–3	62–75	PhilSports Arena; 1,095	0–2	0	P2

March: 1–3 (3 points)

Match	Date	Opponent	Sets	Total	Location Attendance	Record	Pts	Report
3	March 7, 2024	Cignal	0–3	59–75	PhilSports Arena; 1,043	0–3	0	P2
4	March 12, 2024	Galeries Tower	3–0	75–54	PhilSports Arena; 762	1–3	3	P2
5	March 16, 2024	Akari	0–3	56–75	Santa Rosa Sports Complex; 5,178	1–4	3	P2
6	March 26, 2024	Chery Tiggo	1–3	84–98	PhilSports Arena; 2,807	1–5	3	P2

April: 3–2 (8 points)

Match	Date	Opponent	Sets	Total	Location Attendance	Record	Pts	Report
7	April 4, 2024	Strong Group	3–0	75–47	PhilSports Arena; 340	2–5	6	P2
8	April 9, 2024	Farm Fresh	3–2	109–105	PhilSports Arena; 419	3–5	8	P2
9	April 13, 2024	Creamline	0–3	54–75	PhilSports Arena; 3,978	3–6	8	P2
10	April 23, 2024	Capital1	3–0	75–58	PhilSports Arena; 1,065	4–6	11	P2
11	April 27, 2024	Petro Gazz	1–3	93–97	PhilSports Arena; 704	4–7	11	P2

== Draft ==
Round	Pick	Player	Pos.	School
1	5	Lucille Almonte	OH	Adamson
2	17	Razel Aldea	MB	Perpetual

== Reinforced Conference ==
=== Preliminary round ===
==== Standings ====
Pos	Team	Pld	W	L	Pts	SW	SL	SR	SPW	SPL	SPR	Qualification
8	Farm Fresh Foxies	8	3	5	8	11	17	0.647	575	576	0.998	Quarterfinals
9	Choco Mucho Flying Titans	8	2	6	7	11	21	0.524	661	693	0.954	
10	Nxled Chameleons	8	1	7	3	6	23	0.261	510	609	0.837	
11	Galeries Tower Highrisers	8	0	8	4	11	24	0.458	728	842	0.865	
12	Zus Coffee Thunderbelles	8	0	8	0	3	24	0.125	505	657	0.769	

Source: Premier Volleyball League

==== Match log ====
2024 PVL Reinforced Conference preliminary round match log
Total: 1–7 (3 points)
July: 1–2 (2 points)

Match	Date	Opponent	Sets	Total	Location Attendance	Record	Pts	Report
1	July 16, 2024	Galeries Tower	3–2	112–101	PhilSports Arena; 1,517	1–0	2	P2
2	July 20, 2024	Chery Tiggo	0–3	59–75	PhilSports Arena; 1,019	1–1	2	P2
3	July 30, 2024	PLDT	0–3	65–82	PhilSports Arena; 1,897	1–2	2	P2

August: 0–5 (1 points)

Match	Date	Opponent	Sets	Total	Location Attendance	Record	Pts	Report
4	August 3, 2024	Farm Fresh	0–3	48–75	PhilSports Arena; 810	1–3	2	P2
5	August 8, 2024	Creamline	0–3	56–75	PhilSports Arena; 822	1–4	2	P2
6	August 10, 2024	Capital1	2–3	91–105	PhilSports Arena; 603	1–5	3	P2
7	August 15, 2024	Akari	1–3	79–96	PhilSports Arena; 410	1–6	3	P2
8	August 20, 2024	Cignal	0–3	65–77	Filoil EcoOil Centre; 220	1–7	3	P2

== 2024–25 All-Filipino Conference ==
=== Preliminary round ===
==== Standings ====
Pos	Team	Pld	W	L	Pts	SW	SL	SR	SPW	SPL	SPR	Qualification
8	Chery Tiggo Crossovers	11	5	6	14	20	24	0.833	957	966	0.991	Qualifying round
9	Zus Coffee Thunderbelles	11	4	7	14	20	23	0.870	958	962	0.996	Qualifying round
10	Galeries Tower Highrisers	11	1	10	5	10	30	0.333	835	949	0.880	Qualifying round
11	Capital1 Solar Spikers	11	1	10	5	8	31	0.258	754	926	0.814	Qualifying round
12	Nxled Chameleons	11	1	10	4	9	31	0.290	817	952	0.858	Qualifying round

Source: Premier Volleyball League

==== Match log ====
2024–25 PVL All-Filipino Conference preliminary round match log
Total: 1–10 (4 points)
November: 0–4 (0 points)

Match	Date	Opponent	Sets	Total	Location Attendance	Record	Pts	Report
1	November 12, 2024	PLDT	1–3	79–97	PhilSports Arena; 280	0–1	0	P2
2	November 19, 2024	Zus Coffee	1–3	85–94	Ynares Center; 338	0–2	0	P2
3	November 26, 2024	Chery Tiggo	0–3	57–76	PhilSports Arena; 530	0–3	0	P2
4	November 30, 2024	Capital1	1–3	79–96	PhilSports Arena; 577	0–4	0	P2

December: 0–1 (0 points)

Match	Date	Opponent	Sets	Total	Location Attendance	Record	Pts	Report
5	December 7, 2024	Cignal	0–3	63–75	Minglanilla Sports Complex; 4,205	0–5	0	P2

January: 0–3 (0 points)

Match	Date	Opponent	Sets	Total	Location Attendance	Record	Pts	Report
6	January 18, 2025	Farm Fresh	0–3	67–76	PhilSports Arena; 1,426	0–6	0	P2
7	January 23, 2025	Akari	1–3	87–97	PhilSports Arena; 1,002	0–7	0	P2
8	January 28, 2025	Creamline	0–3	52–75	PhilSports Arena; 1,143	0–8	0	P2

February: 1–2 (4 points)

Match	Date	Opponent	Sets	Total	Location Attendance	Record	Pts	Report
9	February 8, 2025	Galeries Tower	3–1	94–82	PhilSports Arena; 1,967	1–8	3	P2
10	February 13, 2025	Choco Mucho	2–3	104–109	Ninoy Aquino Stadium; 872	1–9	4	P2
11	February 20, 2025	Petro Gazz	0–3	50–75	PhilSports Arena; 1,556	1–10	4	P2

=== Qualifying round ===
==== Match log ====
2024–25 PVL All-Filipino Conference qualifying round match log
Total: 0–1 (0 points)
Qualifying round: 0–1 (0 points)

Date	Opponent	Sets	Total	Location Attendance	Report
February 27, 2025	Creamline	0–3	52–75	PhilSports Arena; 1,471	P2

=== Play-in tournament ===
==== Pool B standings ====
Pos	Team	Pld	W	L	Pts	SW	SL	SR	SPW	SPL	SPR	Qualification
1	Chery Tiggo Crossovers	2	2	0	6	6	1	6.000	170	153	1.111	Final round
2	Nxled Chameleons	2	1	1	3	3	3	1.000	133	128	1.039	
3	Farm Fresh Foxies	2	0	2	0	1	6	0.167	147	169	0.870	

Source: Premier Volleyball League

==== Match log ====
2024–25 PVL All-Filipino Conference play-in tournament match log
Total: 1–1 (3 points)
Play-in tournament: 1–1 (3 points)

Match	Date	Opponent	Sets	Total	Location Attendance	Record	Pts	Report
1	March 6, 2025	Chery Tiggo	0–3	58–76	PhilSports Arena; 420	0–1	0	P2
2	March 13, 2025	Farm Fresh	3–0	75–52	PhilSports Arena; 260	1–1	3	P2

== Transactions ==
=== Additions ===
Player	Date signed	Previous team	Ref.
Ivy Lacsina	December 30, 2023	F2 Logistics Cargo Movers	
Jaila Atienza	January 23, 2024	Chery Tiggo Crossovers	
Bang Pineda	May 20, 2024	Akari Chargers	
Trisha Genesis	May 20, 2024	Akari Chargers	
Jaja Maraguinot	May 20, 2024	Akari Chargers	
Razel Aldea	July 8, 2024	Perpetual Lady Altas (NCAA)	
Lucille Almonte	July 11, 2024	Adamson Lady Falcons (UAAP)	
Mary Anne Esguerra	July 13, 2024	Galeries Tower Highrisers	
Jaycel delos Reyes	November 11, 2024	Zus Coffee Thunderbelles	
Ivy Perez	November 11, 2024	Chery Tiggo Crossovers	
EJ Laure	November 25, 2024	Chery Tiggo Crossovers	

=== Subtractions ===
Player	New team	Ref.
Judith Abil	Cignal HD Spikers	
Kamille Cal	Akari Chargers	
Trisha Genesis	Capital1 Solar Spikers	
Ivy Lacsina	Akari Chargers	
Jhoanna Maraguinot	Galeries Tower Highrisers	
Janine Navarro	Capital1 Solar Spikers	
Dani Ravena	Akari Chargers	
Camille Victoria	Akari Chargers	

=== Foreign guest player ===
Team	Foreign player	Moving from	Ref.
Nxled Chameleons	(China) Jiang Xuanyao (replaced; did not play)	(China) Sichuan Wuliangchun	
Nxled Chameleons	(United States) Meegan Hart	(Cyprus) Olympiada Neapolis VB	

=== Coaching changes ===
Team	Outgoing coach	Manner of departure	Replaced by	Ref
Nxled Chameleons	(Japan) Takayuki Minowa	traded to Nxled Chameleons	(China) Chen Gang	
Nxled Chameleons	(China) Chen Gang	Replaced	(Italy) Ettore Guidetti	
