= 2026–27 Premier Volleyball League All-Filipino Conference =

Volleyball tournament in the Philippines

- Duration: October 10, 2026 – April 2027
- Teams: 9
- Matches: 24
- Attendance: 34,230 (1,426 per match)
- TV partner(s): One Sports; One Sports+
- Streaming partner(s): Cignal Play; One Sports YouTube channel

PVL All-Filipino Conference chronology
- < 2026

PVL conference chronology
- < 2026 Invitational

The 2026–27 Premier Volleyball League All-Filipino Conference is the second conference of the 2026–27 Premier Volleyball League season and the 11th running of the All-Filipino Conference. The tournament began on October 10, 2026 and will end sometime in April 2027.

The conference is split into three series, with the first two series featuring traditional formats while the third series will be a final playoff tournament where the league will declare its first-ever season champion, dubbed the "Philippine Grand Champion". Due to the larger scope of this conference, it is also expected to be the only regular tournament of the season as the prior Invitational Conference was part of the preseason.

This conference also see integration with the 2026–27 Spikers' Turf season, with matches of the men's league scheduled in between PVL matches.

The Creamline Cool Smashers are the defending All-Filipino Conference champions.

== Teams ==
2026–27 Premier Volleyball League All-Filipino Conference teams
Abbr.	Team	Affiliation	Head coach	Team captain
AKA	Akari Chargers	Akari Lighting & Technology	(Philippines) Tina Salak	Justine Jazareno
CAP	Capital1 Solar Spikers	CapitalOne Energy Corp.	(Brazil) Jorge de Brito	Pauline Gaston
CMF	Choco Mucho Flying Titans	Republic Biscuit Corporation	(Philippines) Dante Alinsunurin	Desiree Cheng
CCS	Creamline Cool Smashers	Republic Biscuit Corporation	(Philippines) Sherwin Meneses	Alyssa Valdez
FFF	Farm Fresh Foxies	Farm Fresh Philippine International / Strong Group Athletics	(Japan) Koji Tsuzurabara	Alohi Robins-Hardy
GTH	Galeries Tower Highrisers	Grand Taipan Land Development	(Philippines) Aying Esteban	Roselle Baliton
NXL	Nxled Chameleons	Akari Lighting & Technology	(Italy) Ettore Guidetti	Brooke Van Sickle
HSH	PLDT High Speed Hitters	PLDT Inc.	(Philippines) Rald Ricafort	Kath Arado
ZUS	Zus Coffee Thunderbelles	Zuspresso Sdn. Bhd. / Strong Group Athletics	(Philippines) Jerry Yee	Cloanne Mondoñedo

== Venues ==
Some venues were confirmed prior to the schedule release. On August 7, 2026, following the cancellation of a matchday in Santiago, Isabela for the 2026 PVL on Tour due to weather conditions brought by Tropical Storm Maymay (Peilou), the league has intended to visit the city for this conference. On September 3, Sports Vision announced that both the PVL and the men's league, Spikers' Turf, will have their opening matchdays at SM Seaside Cebu Arena in Cebu City.

Regular venues

Pasay	Quezon City	Pasig	San Juan
SM Mall of Asia Arena	Araneta Coliseum	PhilSports Arena	Filoil Centre
Capacity: 20,000	Capacity: 15,000	Capacity: 10,000	Capacity: 6,000

Manila
Ninoy Aquino Stadium
Capacity: 6,000
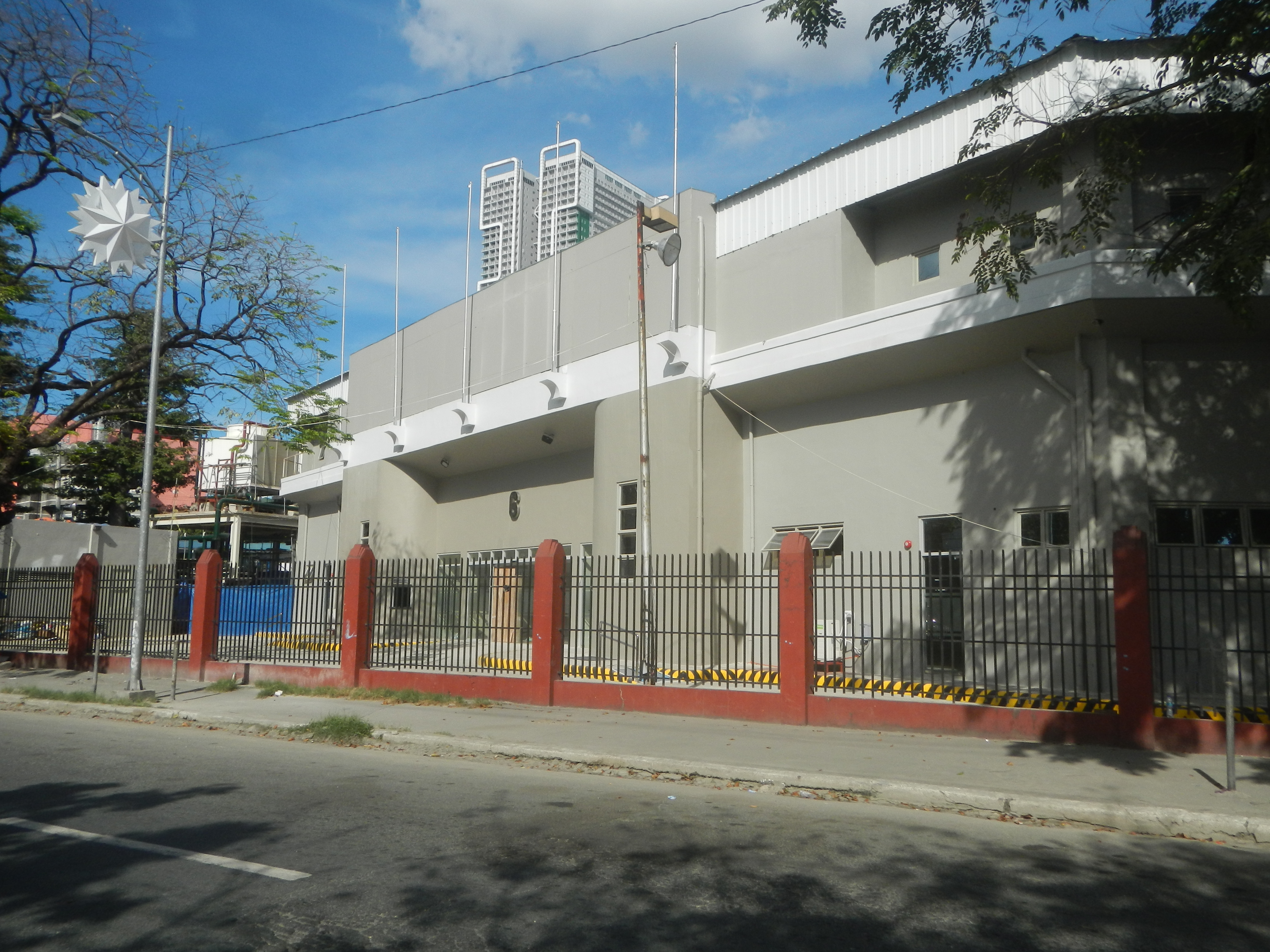

PVL on Tour

Cebu City	Santiago, Isabela	Antipolo, Rizal
SM Seaside Cebu Arena	Santiago City Sports Arena	Ynares Center Antipolo
Capacity: 16,000	Capacity: 8,000	Capacity: 7,400

== Format ==
The entire conference will be split into three series named Siklab, Sigla, and Sinag. The Siklab and Sigla share the same format while the Sinag series uses a more playoff-style format as described below.

=== Siklab and Sigla series ===
Preliminary round

The first two series will feature traditional formats with teams competing in a single round-robin tournament, each playing eight matches, one against each team. The top four teams will advance to the semifinals.

Semifinals

The top four teams from the preliminary round will compete in the semifinals. The top two teams have a twice-to-beat advantage, meaning they only need to win one of two matches while the lower-seeded teams need to win both matches back-to-back. The winners advancing to the finals while the losers will compete in the third place series. The match-ups for the semifinals are as follows:

- SF1: #1 vs. #4
- SF2: #2 vs. #3

Third place series

The losing teams from the semifinals compete in a best-of-three series to determine which team will finish third.

Finals

The winning teams from the semifinals compete in a best-of-three series to determine the series winners. The losing team in this round will be declared series runners-up.

All-to-start rule

In the Siklab series, the all-to-start rule will be enforced, where all players in a team must start in at least one of the first three sets, where substitutions can only be made when either teams reach 16 points. All players in the roster must also play at least one match in the preliminaries. In the Sigla series, the rule will no longer be in effect, giving teams free will on roster management.

Points accumulation

Across both series, teams will earn points based on their performance in each series, which will be used to determine seeding for the Sinag series.

=== Sinag series ===
All nine teams will compete in the Sinag series, but where they will start will depend on their points standings:

- The first and second place teams will start from the semifinals;
- The third and fourth place teams will start from the second round of the stepladder;
- The fifth and sixth place teams will start from the first round of the stepladder;
- The seventh through ninth place teams will start from the preliminary round.

Preliminary round

The seventh through ninth place teams will compete in a single round-robin. The top two teams will advance to the play-in tournament as the seventh and eighth seeds while the lowest-ranking team will be eliminated and ranked 9th.

Stepladder rounds

The top two teams from the qualifying round will join the third through sixth seeds in the stepladder, which will replicate the play-in tournament format from the 2026 All-Filipino Conference. These six teams will be assigned to one of two brackets via the serpentine system. The match-ups will be as follows:

Pool A

- S1-A: #6 vs. #7
- S2-A: #3 vs. S1-A winner

Pool B

- S1-B: #5 vs. #8
- S2-B: #4 vs. S1-B winner

Semifinals

Two teams from the stepladder will join the top two teams based on points in the semifinals. This time, both series will be best-of-three with no advantage given. The match-ups for the semifinals are as follows:

- SF1: Points #1 vs. S2-B winner
- SF2: Points #2 vs. S2-A winner

Third place series

The losing teams from the semifinals compete in a best-of-three series to determine which team will finish third in this season.

Finals

The winning teams from the semifinals compete in a best-of-three series to determine the season champions. The losing team in this round will be declared season runners-up.

== Pool standing procedure ==
Teams are initially ranked by wins followed by match points. A win awards three points if the match lasted for three or four sets (3–0 or 3–1), or two points if the match lasted for five sets (3–2). A loss only awards one point if the match lasted for five sets (2–3).

If multiple teams tie for wins and match points, the next criteria are set ratio (the number of sets won divided by number of sets lost across all matches) and point ratio (the number of points won divided by number of points lost across all matches). If any teams remain tied, the procedure will be applied again, but only considering matches between the remaining tied teams.

== Siklab series ==
=== Preliminary round ===
==== Standings ====
Pos	Team	Pld	W	L	Pts	SW	SL	SR	SPW	SPL	SPR	Qualification
1	Nxled Chameleons	8	8	0	23	24	6	4.000	713	608	1.173	Twice-to-beat in semifinals
2	Creamline Cool Smashers	8	5	3	16	19	11	1.727	701	641	1.094	Twice-to-beat in semifinals
3	Choco Mucho Flying Titans	8	5	3	15	20	15	1.333	783	736	1.064	Twice-to-win in semifinals
4	Farm Fresh Foxies	8	5	3	14	19	16	1.188	758	755	1.004	Twice-to-win in semifinals
5	PLDT High Speed Hitters	8	4	4	13	15	15	1.000	677	666	1.017	
6	Akari Chargers	8	3	5	9	14	19	0.737	724	745	0.972	
7	Capital1 Solar Spikers	8	3	5	7	13	21	0.619	720	761	0.946	
8	Zus Coffee Thunderbelles	8	2	6	7	12	21	0.571	676	734	0.921	
9	Galeries Tower Highrisers	8	1	7	4	11	23	0.478	683	789	0.866	

Source: Premier Volleyball League

==== Results table ====
Team	Game							
Team	1	2	3	4	5	6	7	8
Akari (AKA)	CCS; 0–3	CAP; 2–3	HSH; 3–0	FFF; 3–2	GTH; 2–3	CMF; 3–2	NXL; 0–3	ZUS; 1–3
Capital1 (CAP)	CMF; 2–3	AKA; 3–2	ZUS; 3–2	HSH; 1–3	CCS; 0–3	NXL; 0–3	FFF; 1–3	GTH; 3–2
Choco Mucho (CMF)	CAP; 3–2	ZUS; 3–0	FFF; 2–3	GTH; 3–1	NXL; 1–3	AKA; 2–3	CCS; 3–2	HSH; 3–1
Creamline (CCS)	AKA; 3–0	GTH; 3–1	ZUS; 3–1	CAP; 3–0	HSH; 1–3	CMF; 2–3	NXL; 1–3	FFF; 3–0
Farm Fresh (FFF)	GTH; 3–0	NXL; 2–3	CMF; 3–2	AKA; 2–3	ZUS; 3–2	HSH; 3–2	CAP; 3–1	CCS; 0–3
Galeries Tower (GTH)	FFF; 0–3	CCS; 1–3	NXL; 1–3	CMF; 1–3	AKA; 3–2	ZUS; 2–3	HSH; 1–3	CAP; 2–3
Nxled (NXL)	HSH; 3–0	FFF; 3–2	GTH; 3–1	CMF; 3–1	CAP; 3–0	AKA; 3–0	CCS; 3–1	ZUS; 3–1
PLDT (HSH)	NXL; 0–3	AKA; 0–3	CAP; 3–1	ZUS; 3–0	CCS; 3–1	FFF; 2–3	GTH; 3–1	CMF; 1–3
Zus Coffee (ZUS)	CMF; 0–3	CAP; 2–3	CCS; 1–3	HSH; 0–3	FFF; 2–3	GTH; 3–2	AKA; 3–1	NXL; 1–3

Source: Premier Volleyball League
Legend: Blue = win; Red = loss

=== Bracket ===
- All times are Philippine Standard Time (UTC+8:00).
- #1 & #2 seed have a twice-to-beat advantage in the semifinals.
- Championship & 3rd place matches are best-of-three series.

Semifinals
November 24–26
1 Nxled
4 Farm Fresh
November 24–26
2 Creamline
3 Choco Mucho

Championship
Nov. 28–Dec. 3
3rd place match
Nov. 28–Dec. 3

=== Semifinals ===
==== (1) Nxled vs. (4) Farm Fresh ====
November 24, 2026; 03:30pm	Nxled Chameleons	v	Farm Fresh Foxies	PhilSports Arena, Pasig

==== (2) Creamline vs. (3) Choco Mucho ====
November 24, 2026; 06:00pm	Creamline Cool Smashers	v	Choco Mucho Flying Titans	PhilSports Arena, Pasig

== PVLPC Player of the Week ==
Week	Player	Team	Ref.
October 10–17	Brooke Van Sickle	Nxled Chameleons	
October 20–24	Mylene Paat-Rezanova	Farm Fresh Foxies	
October 27–29	Eli Soyud	Akari Chargers	
November 3–7	Erika Deloria	Galeries Tower Highrisers	
November 10–14	Trisha Tubu	Farm Fresh Foxies	
November 17–21	Sisi Rondina-Rosales	Choco Mucho Flying Titans	

== See also ==
- 2026 Spikers' Turf Invitational Conference
