= 2026 Nxled Chameleons season =

The 2026 Nxled Chameleons season may refer to:

- 2025–26 Nxled Chameleons season
- 2026–27 Nxled Chameleons season
