= Papatchaya Phontham =

Thai volleyball player

Personal information
- Nickname: Aomsup
- Nationality: Thai
- Born: 24 January 2006 (age 20)
- Hometown: Nakhon Ratchasima
- Height: 177 cm (70 in)

Volleyball information
- Position: Opposite hitter

Career
Years	Teams
–	Nakhon Ratchasima VC

National team
2026–present	Thailand

Papatchaya Phontham (Thai: ปพัชญา พลทำ) is a Thai volleyball player.

== Early life ==
Papatchaya Phontham was born on 24 January 2006. She hails from Nakhon Ratchasima attended Suranaree School.

== Career ==
Papatchaya is known in Thailand by the nickname Aomsup (ออมทรัพย์). She plays as an opposite hitter and is left-handed.

=== Club ===
==== Nakhon Ratchasima ====
At the club level, Papatchaya has played for Nakhon Ratchasima VC. She won the Best Opposite Hitter award when Nakhon Ratchasima won the 2026 season of the Women's Volleyball Thailand League.

==== Team Est Cola ====
Papatchaya has played for the Thai non-league team Est Cola. She was part of the team which finished fourth at the 2024 Invitational Conference of the Premier Volleyball League (PVL) in the Philippines.

Papatchaya returned to play for Est Cola in the Philippines at the 2026 PVL Invitational Conference. Est Cola won the tournament with Papatchaya becoming the first ever player from a guest team to win the PVL Most Valuable Player award.

=== National team ===
Papatchaya is a product of the Thailand women's national team youth program having played in the U19, U20, U21 levels.

She made her senior national team debut in June 2026 at the 2026 FIVB Women's Volleyball Nations League preliminary round in China.
