= Rald Ricafort =

Filipino volleyball coach

Personal information
- Nationality: Filipino
- Born: 1988 or 1989 (age 37–38)

Coaching information
- Current team: PLDT High Speed Hitters
Previous teams coached
Years	Teams
2019–2023; 2022; 2023–	UP Fighting Maroons (men); Petro Gazz Angels; PLDT High Speed Hitters

Rald Ricafort is a Filipino volleyball coach who is the head coach of the PLDT High Speed Hitters of the Premier Volleyball League.

== Career ==
=== UP Fighting Maroons ===
Ricafort was head coach of the UP Fighting Maroons men's volleyball team. He left the role by mid-2023.

=== Petro Gazz ===
Ricafort has been part of the Petro Gazz Angels since their debut season in the Premier Volleyball League in 2018. He was promoted to head coach for the 2022 Reinforced Conference which Petro Gazz won.

=== PLDT ===
In January 2023, Ricafort was hired as the head coach of the PLDT High Speed Hitters.

He led PLDT to winning the 2025 PVL on Tour. With that win he became the first coach to win multiple PVL titles with different teams. He followed it up by winning the 2025 Invitational Conference title. As a result, Ricafort was named PVL Coach of the Year at the 2026 PVL Press Corps Awards Night

== Personal life ==
Ricafort is in a relationship with volleyball player Myla Pablo. Pablo has previously played with Petro Gazz under Ricafort's tutulege.
