= Lucille Almonte =

Filipino volleyball player

Personal information
- Full name: Lucille May M. Almonte
- Nationality: Filipino
- Born: January 25, 2001 (age 25)
- Hometown: Davao City, Philippines
- Height: 1.70 m (5 ft 7 in)
- Education: Adamson University (2019–2024)

Volleyball information
- Position: Outside hitter
- Current club: Nxled Chameleons
- Number: 17

Career
Years	Teams
2024–present	Nxled Chameleons

Lucille May M. Almonte (born January 25, 2001) is a Filipino professional volleyball player. She was the team captain of the Adamson Lady Falcons of the University Athletic Association of the Philippines (UAAP) before turning pro under the Nxled Chameleons of the Premier Volleyball League (PVL).

== Early life ==
Almonte attended high school at the Davao City National High School and Kings' Montessori School in Quezon City.

She graduated from Adamson University with a fitness and sports management degree magna cum laude in 2024.

== Career ==
=== College ===
Almonte played five years of college volleyball for the Lady Falcons in the UAAP. In 2023, she was part of the team which won 2nd runner-up in Season 85 of the UAAP women's volleyball, ending a nine-year Final Four drought of Adamson.

Almonte, Trisha Genesis, Lorene Toring, Louie Romero, and the rest of the Lady Falcons of then coach Lerma Giron won a championship over the UST Golden Tigresses in the 2019 PVL Collegiate Conference.

=== Professional ===
Almonte was drafted 5th overall by the Nxled Chameleons during the PVL Draft on July 8, 2024.

After beating the Galeries Tower Highrisers in the elimination round of the 2024-25 PVL All-Filipino Conference, Nxled aimed to triumph back to back with outside hitter Almonte's 11 points helping the team surge for the fifth and final set against the Choco Mucho Flying Titans, but the latter prevailed.

== Awards ==
=== Collegiate team ===
- 2022-23 UAAP Season 85 volleyball tournaments – Bronze medal, with Adamson Soaring Lady Falcons
- 2023 Shakey's Super League National Invitationals − Silver medal, with Adamson Soaring Lady Falcons
- 2019 PVL Collegiate Conference - Champion, with Adamson Soaring Lady Falcons
