= Nxled Chameleons =

Professional women's volleyball team

- 2026–27 Nxled Chameleons season
- Short name: Nxled
- Nickname: Chameleons
- Founded: 2023
- History: Nxled Chameleons; 2023–present
- Owner: Akari Lighting & Technology Corporation
- Head coach: Ettore Guidetti
- Captain: Brooke Van Sickle
- League: Premier Volleyball League
- 2026 Invitational: Runner-up

The Nxled Chameleons (stylized as NXLED) is a Philippine women's professional volleyball team playing owned by Akari Lighting & Technology Corporation. The team competes in the Premier Volleyball League (PVL), and were established in 2023 as the sister team to the Akari Chargers.

The team debuted in the 2023 Second All-Filipino Conference. During their first few seasons, the team struggled to produce good results, only advancing out of prelims once. In 2026, Nxled saw a major shift when the team signed a majority of the disbanded Petro Gazz Angels roster, including Brooke Van Sickle, MJ Phillips, and Myla Pablo.

== History ==
=== 2023–2025: Early struggles ===
The Nxled Chameleons was formed in 2023 as the second team of lighting firm Akari Lighting & Technology Corporation in the Premier Volleyball League; the first being the Akari Chargers. They were formed ahead the second All-Filipino Conference of the 2023 season. They appointed Takayuki Minowa, Jaja Santiago's husband as their inaugural head coach.

=== 2026–present: De facto merger with Petro Gazz ===
During the first week of January 2026, Nxled was part of a potential merger of the Petro Gazz Angels, which would see the latter team's core join the Chameleons. The merger was blocked by the league on January 7. Despite that, in the days following Petro Gazz's departure from the PVL on January 10, Nxled signed a majority of the disbanded Angels roster, culminating with the acquisitions of Brooke Van Sickle, MJ Phillips, and Myla Pablo.

== Current roster ==
Nxled Chameleons roster
No.	Nat.	Player	Pos.	Height	DOB	From
1	(Philippines)	Bang Pineda	Libero	1.60 m (5 ft 3 in)	January 21, 1991 (age 35)	Adamson
2	(Philippines)	Djanel Cheng	Setter	1.70 m (5 ft 7 in)	August 28, 1994 (age 32)	St. Benilde
3	(Philippines)	EJ Laure	Outside Hitter	1.75 m (5 ft 9 in)	July 31, 1997 (age 29)	UST
5	(Philippines)	Jules Tolentino	Setter	1.87 m (6 ft 2 in)	July 8, 2002 (age 24)	De La Salle
6	(Philippines)	Irah Jaboneta	Libero	1.62 m (5 ft 4 in)	March 7, 2001 (age 25)	Philippines
7	(Philippines)	Krich Macaslang	Middle Blocker	1.83 m (6 ft 0 in)	January 25, 2000 (age 26)	Adamson
8	(Philippines)	Myla Pablo	Outside Hitter	1.78 m (5 ft 10 in)	September 12, 1993 (age 33)	National-U
9	(Philippines)	Chiara Permentilla	Outside Hitter	1.73 m (5 ft 8 in)	November 26, 1997 (age 28)	Adamson
10	(Philippines) (United States)	Brooke Van Sickle (C)	Outside Hitter	1.75 m (5 ft 9 in)	March 22, 1999 (age 27)	Hawaiʻi
11	(Philippines)	Jackie Acuña	Middle Blocker	1.82 m (6 ft 0 in)	July 28, 2000 (age 26)	National-U
13	(Philippines) (United States)	MJ Phillips	Middle Blocker	1.82 m (6 ft 0 in)	June 15, 1995 (age 31)	Juniata
15	(Philippines)	Ranya Musa	Middle Blocker	1.80 m (5 ft 11 in)	February 13, 1997 (age 29)	St. Benilde
16	(Philippines)	Lyann De Guzman	Opposite Hitter	1.78 m (5 ft 10 in)	February 14, 2002 (age 24)	Ateneo
19	(Philippines)	Jovelyn Fernandez	Opposite Hitter	1.68 m (5 ft 6 in)	January 4, 2001 (age 25)	Far Eastern
20	(Philippines)	Jonah Sabete	Outside Hitter	1.70 m (5 ft 7 in)	January 29, 1994 (age 32)	Bulacan State
22	(Philippines)	Gel Cayuna	Setter	1.68 m (5 ft 6 in)	August 17, 1998 (age 28)	Far Eastern
23	(Philippines) (Nigeria)	Aduke Ogunsanya	Middle Blocker	1.80 m (5 ft 11 in)	October 2, 1996 (age 30)	De La Salle
24	(Philippines)	Jellie Tempiatura	Libero	1.57 m (5 ft 2 in)	July 24, 1997 (age 29)	Adamson
Updated as of: September 30, 2026 | Source: PVL.ph

Coaching staff

- Head coach:
  Ettore Guidetti
- Assistant coaches:
  Raffy Mosuela
  Lorden Tiu
  Ronchette Lee Villegas
  Jay Chua
  Billie Anima
- Statistician:
  Sid Gerella
  Ramona Bagatsing
- Strength & conditioning coach:
  Juan Paulo Sotelo

Team staff

- Team managers:
  Dzi Gervacio
  Cha Cruz-Behag
- Team coordinator:
  Evelyn Dris
- Utility:
  Jerry Jun Agaton

Medical staff

- Physical therapist:
  Karen Cathleen Adubal
  Fe Marie Joy Accordon
- Nutritionist:
  Dr. Jo-Ann Tan Lorenzo

== Season-by-season records ==
Season	Conference	Preliminary round	Final round	Ranking	Source
2023 (team)	Second All-Filipino	9th (4–7, 12 pts)	Did not qualify	9th place	
2024–25 (team)	All-Filipino	8th (4–7, 11 pts)	Did not qualify	8th place	
2024–25 (team)	Reinforced	10th (1–7, 3 pts)	Did not qualify	10th place	
2024–25 (team)	Invitational	Did not qualify			
2024–25 (team)	All-Filipino	12th (1–10, 4 pts)	Did not qualify	12th place	
2025–26 (team)	PVL on Tour	2nd (4–1, 11 pts) (Pool A)	Lost in quarterfinals vs. Chery Tiggo, 0–3*	5th place	
2025–26 (team)	Invitational	Did not qualify			
2025–26 (team)	Reinforced	11th (0–8, 1 pts)	Did not qualify	11th place	
2025–26 (team)	All-Filipino	5th (5–4, 15 pts)	Lost in Play-in final (Pool A) vs. Farm Fresh, 0–3*	5th place	
2026–27 (team)	Invitational	2nd (3–2, 10 pts)	Lost in finals vs. Est Cola, 0–3*	Runner-up	
An asterisk (*) indicates single match

== Individual awards ==
Fair Play Award

- 2024 All-Filipino

Best Outside Spiker

- Brooke Van Sickle – 2026 All-Filipino
- Jonah Sabete-Escamillan – 2026 Invitational

Best Middle Blocker

- MJ Phillips – 2026 Invitational

Best Setter

- Gel Cayuna – 2026 Invitational

== Team captains ==
- (Philippines) Dani Ravena (2023–2024)
- (Philippines) Janel Maraguinot (2024)
- (Philippines) Chiara Permentilla (2024-2025)
- (Philippines) (United States) Brooke Van Sickle (2026–present)

== Former players ==
- Aby Maraño (2026)
- Antonette Adolfo
- Camille Victoria
- Dani Ravena
- Ivy Perez
- Ivy Lacsina
- Jaila Atienza
- Janel Maraguinot
- Jannine Navarro
- Jhoanna Maraguinot
- Judith Abil
- Kamille Cal
- Lia Pelaga
- Lucille Almonte (2024-2025)
- Lycha Ebon
- Maji Mangulabnan
- May Luna-Lumahan
- Mayang Nuique (2025)
- Nicole Tiamzon
- Rachel Jorvina
- Razel Aldea

== Draft history ==
Season	Pick No.	Name
2024	5	Lucille Almonte
2024	17	Razel Aldea
2025	4	Lyann De Guzman
2025	13	Mayang Nuique
2026	5	Irah Jaboneta

== Coaches ==
- (Japan) Takayuki Minowa (2023–2024)
- (China) Chen Gang (2024)
- (Italy) Ettore Guidetti (2024-present)

== Imports ==
- (China) Jiang Xuanyao (2024)
- (United States) Meegan Hart (2024)
- (Spain) Paola Martinez Vela (2025)
