= Ho Chi Minh City women's volleyball team =

Volleyball club based in Ho Chi Minh City

Ho Chi Minh City
- Full name: Ho Chi Minh City women's volleyball team
- Short name: TPHCM
- Head coach: Trần Thị Hiền
- League: National A-League Volleyball Championship

The Ho Chi Minh City women's volleyball team (Vietnamese: Đội bóng chuyền nữ Thành phố Hồ Chí Minh; abbreviated as TPHCM or TP.HCM) is a women's volleyball club based in Ho Chi Minh City, Vietnam.

== History ==
The women's volleyball team of Ho Chi Minh City was established by Phạm Ngọc Sơn. It was known to compete under the name Tân Bình district representing the whole city. It is supported by the Ho Chi Minh City Volleyball Federation.

As Tân Bình TPHCM, the team first debuted at the Volleyball Vietnam League in 2010. They got relegated in 2017, and started competing in the National A-League Volleyball Championship in 2018. It is the second division competition of the Vietnamese volleyball league system. Trần Hiền, who has recently retired as TPHCM's player, became head coach.

From 2018 to 2021, TPHCM came close to promotion back to the top division with the team finishing not lower than third place in three seasons. In 2022, they won National A-League before relegating back after the conclusion of the Volleyball Vietnam League 2023 season. They got promoted again for the 2024 season before relegating back to the second division for the 2025 season.

As of 2026, they are currently competing in the National A-League Volleyball Championship. Ho Chi Minh City will also join the 2026 Invitational Conference of the Premier Volleyball League of the Philippines.

== Head coaches ==
- (Vietnam) Trần Thị Hiền (2018–present)

== Honours ==
- Vietnam National A-League
  - Winners: 2022, 2024
