= Brooke Van Sickle =

Filipino volleyball player (born 1998)

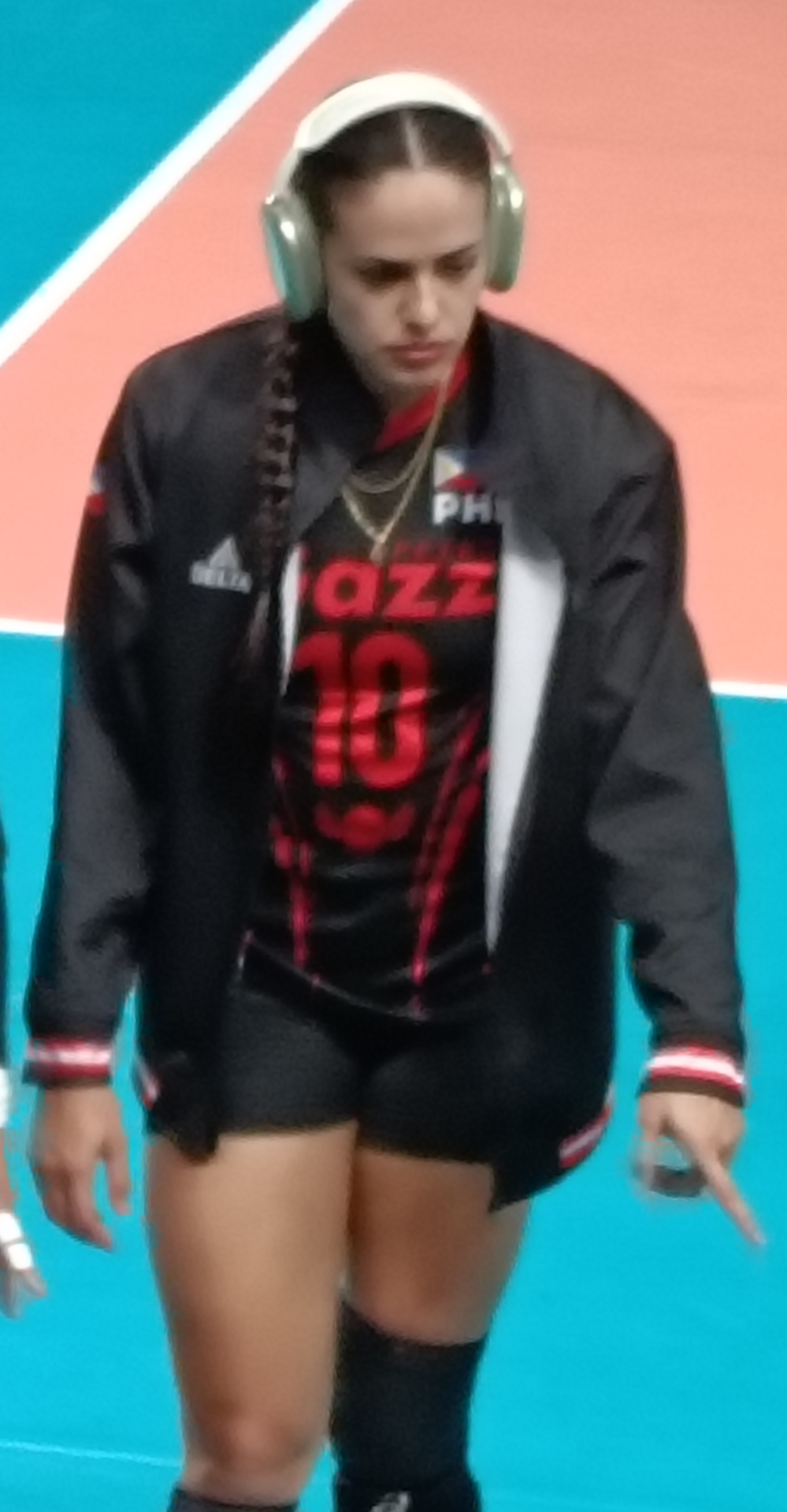
- Van Sickle in 2025

Personal information
- Full name: Brooke Makena Van Sickle
- Nationality: United States (Note: Sporting nationality – not to be confused with citizenship status. Van Sickle is affiliated with USA Volleyball as per the FIVB Player Database. However she has played for the Philippine national team at the 2025 VTV Cup, a non-AVC sanctioned tournament.)
- Born: March 22, 1998 (age 28) Hilo, Hawaii, U.S.
- Home town: Battle Ground, Washington, U.S.
- Education: University of Hawaiʻi at Mānoa (2020–2023)
- Height: 1.71 m (5 ft 7 in)
- Weight: 70 kg (154 lb)
- Spike: 302 cm (119 in)
- Block: 286 cm (113 in)

Volleyball information
- Position: Outside hitter
- Number: 10

Career
- Years: Team
- –: AEL Limassol
- 2024–2025: Petro Gazz Angels
- 2026–present: Nxled Chameleons
- Updated on January 2026

Brooke Makena Van Sickle is a Filipino-American professional volleyball player who is an outside hitter for the Nxled Chameleons of the Premier Volleyball League (PVL).

== Early life and education ==
Brooke Makena Van Sickle was born on March 22, 1998 in Hilo, Hawaii to Gary Van Sickle and Lisa Bragado. However Battle Ground, Washington in the continental United States is her listed hometown. She has Dutch ancestry from her father's side.

Her family has a history in volleyball, with her father Gary a varsity volleyball player for the University of Hawaiʻi (UH) from 1988 to 1990 and her mother playing for Hawaii Pacific University.

Initially into football (soccer), Van Sickle was influenced to take up volleyball to follow her parents.

She would attend the University of Oregon and the University of Hawaiʻi at Mānoa.

== Career ==
Van Sickle played for the volleyball teams of the University of Oregon and the University of Hawaiʻi at Mānoa.

After graduating, Van Sickle briefly played for Cyprus-based team AEL Limassol.

=== Petro Gazz Angels ===
Van Sickle then, moved to the Philippines in January 2024, to sign with Premier Volleyball League (PVL) club Petro Gazz Angels. She received endorsement from former player Lindsey Vander Weide. Van Sickle has been aiming to play in the Philippines since 2021 after learning about the sporting scene in the country from her friend Kalei Mau.

She helped her team win the title of the 2024 PNVF Champions League for Women where she would also be named the Most Valuable Player. Shortly after, Van Sickle made her PVL debut at the 2024 All-Filipino Conference.

Still affiliated with USA Volleyball, Van Sickle filled one of the three foreign quota slots for Petro Gazz at the 2025 AVC Women's Volleyball Champions League

In September 2025, Van Sickle's parents Gary and Lisa joined Petro Gazz as its head coach and assistant coach respectively. The Van Sickles led Petro Gazz to the 2025 PVL Reinforced Conference finals.

=== Nxled Chameleons ===
In January 2026, Van Sickle moved to the Nxled Chameleons after Petro Gazz was disbanded. Due to a shoulder injury, Van Sickle did not play in the PVL on Tour and Invitational Conference before returning to playing in the 2026 PVL All-Filipino Conference.

=== National team ===
Van Sickle expressed interest in playing for the Philippine national team and is processing her sporting nationality from the USA to the Philippines.

Van Sickle made her debut for the Philippines at the 2025 VTV International Women's Volleyball Cup. Van Sickle inclusion in the roster was permitted since the VTV Cup is not an AVC-sanctioned tounrmanet and that FIVB eligibility rules does not apply.

== Personal life ==
Van Sickle's roots in the Philippines trace back as far as her grandfather who hails from San Emilio, Ilocos Sur. She also has Philippine and United States citizenship and is a holder of a Philippine passport.

== Awards ==
Premier Volleyball League

- PVLPC Most Valuable Player: 2025
- Conference Most Valuable Player (3): 2024 All-Filipino, 2024–25 All-Filipino, 2025 Reinforced
- Best Outside Hitter (2): 2024 Reinforced, 2025 Reinforced
- Medals:
  - Champion (2): 2024–25 All-Filipino, 2025 Reinforced
  - Third place: 2024 All-Filipino

PNVF Champions League

- Most Valuable Player: 2024
- Best Outside Hitter: 2024
- Medals:
  - Champion: 2024
