= Jonah Sabete =

Filipino volleyball player

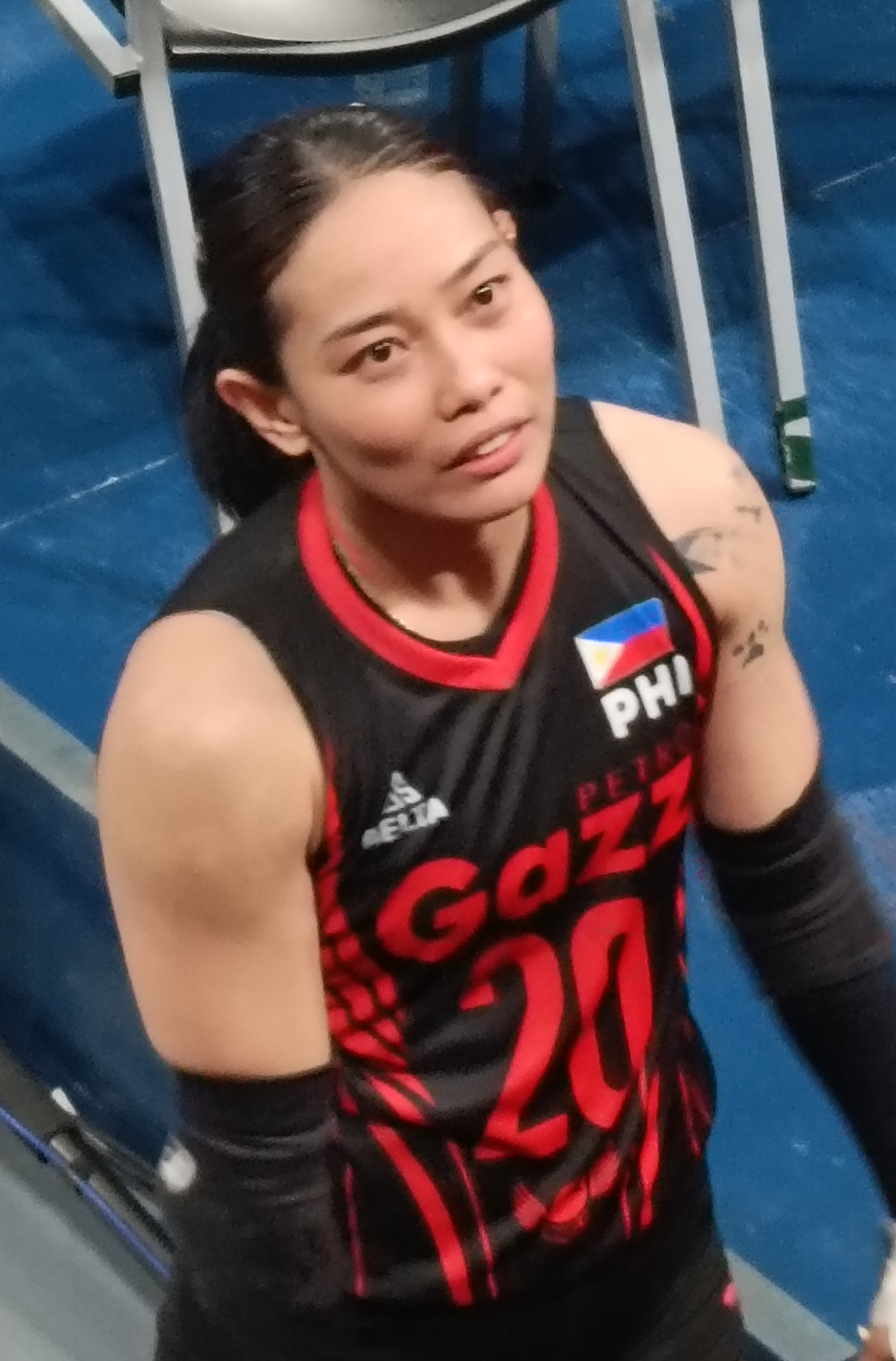
- Sabete in 2025

Personal information
- Nationality: Filipino
- Born: January 29, 1994 (age 32); Kabankalan, Negros Occidental, Philippines
- Hometown: Escalante, Negros Occidental
- Height: 5 ft 7 in (1.70 m)
- Education: Bulacan State University

Volleyball information
- Position: Outside hitter
- Number: 20

Career
Years	Teams
2016	Standard Insurance–Navy Corvettes
2017–2019	Sta. Lucia Lady Realtors
2019	Petro Gazz Angels
2021	Sta. Lucia Lady Realtors
2022–2025	Petro Gazz Angels
2026–present	Nxled Chameleons

Jonah Sabete-Escamillan (born January 29, 1994) is a Filipina professional volleyball player for the Nxled Chameleons of the Premier Volleyball League (PVL).

== Education ==
Hailing from Negros Occidental, Jonah Sabete was born in Kabankalan on January 29, 1994. She was a marathoner during her elementary school studies but was convinced to take up volleyball by a coach. She attended San Pedro High School in Hagonoy, Bulacan. She studied at the Bulacan State University (BulSU) in Malolos.

== Career ==
=== College and youth ===
Sabete played for the BulSU Gold Gears during her collegiate years. She was named part of the 2014 Bulacan Collegiate Athletic Association (BCAA) Mythical Six, 2015 BCAA MVP and Athlete of the Year, 2016 BCAA Athlete of the Year and UCLAA Mythical Six member. She was also represented Bulacan province in the Central Luzon Regional Athletic Association (CLRAA).

=== Club ===
Sabete joined the Philippine Super Liga via the 2016 Philippine Super Liga draft as the seventh pick for the Standard Insurance-Navy Corvettes.

Sabete in played for two season with the Sta. Lucia Lady Realtors in the Philippine Super Liga (PSL) from 2017.

Sabete then moved to the Premier Volleyball League (PVL) in 2019 to join the Petro Gazz Angels where she became a long-time player. The team won its first ever title in the 2019 Reinforced Conference. The COVID-19 pandemic disrupted league activity.

She joined Sta. Lucia's indoor team in 2022. Sta. Lucia has just moved from the PSL to the PVL. She returned to Petro Gazz the following year.

Despite an injury from January to February 2025, Sabete helped the team win the 2024–25 All-Filipino Conference, which is Petro Gazz's first ever All-Filipino title. She also played in the 2025 AVC Women's Volleyball Champions League where her team reached the quarterfinals.

On January 13, 2026, Sabete joined the Nxled Chameleons after Petro Gazz took a leave of absence from the league a few days prior.

=== Beach volleyball ===
Sabete has played beach volleyball for Sta. Lucia. She played alongside Bianca Lizares for Sta. Lucia B in the 2018 PSL Beach Volleyball Challenge Cup For the 2021 edition she played alongside Bang Pineda also with Sta Lucia B.
