= Chiara Permentilla =

Filipino volleyball player

Personal information
- Full name: Chiara May Permentilla
- Nickname: Chiara
- Nationality: Filipino
- Born: November 26, 1997 (age 28)
- Hometown: Lipa, Batangas
- Height: 5 ft 8 in (1.73 m)
- Weight: 58 kg (128 lb)
- Education: Adamson University

Volleyball information
- Position: Outside hitter
- Current club: Nxled Chameleons
- Number: 9

Career
Years	Teams
2018–2019	Marinerang Pilipina Lady Skippers
2022-2024	Akari Chargers
2024–present	Nxled Chameleons

Chiara May Permentilla, also known as Chiara Permentilla, is a Filipino professional volleyball player. She is a former Adamson Lady Falcons player in the University Athletic Association of the Philippines (UAAP) and currently plays for the Nxled Chameleons in the Premier Volleyball League (PVL).

== Early life and education ==
Permentilla attended De La Salle Lipa and Adamson University.

== Career ==
Four years after suffering from an ACL injury, Permentilla regained her old form, playing at a better time with Akari in 2023 as she scored 13 points, 10 digs and eight excellent receptions in a win over Army-Black Mamba.

Having an "Italian connection" with a new coach, Permentilla is now the team captain of Nxled.
