= MJ Phillips =

Filipino–American volleyball player

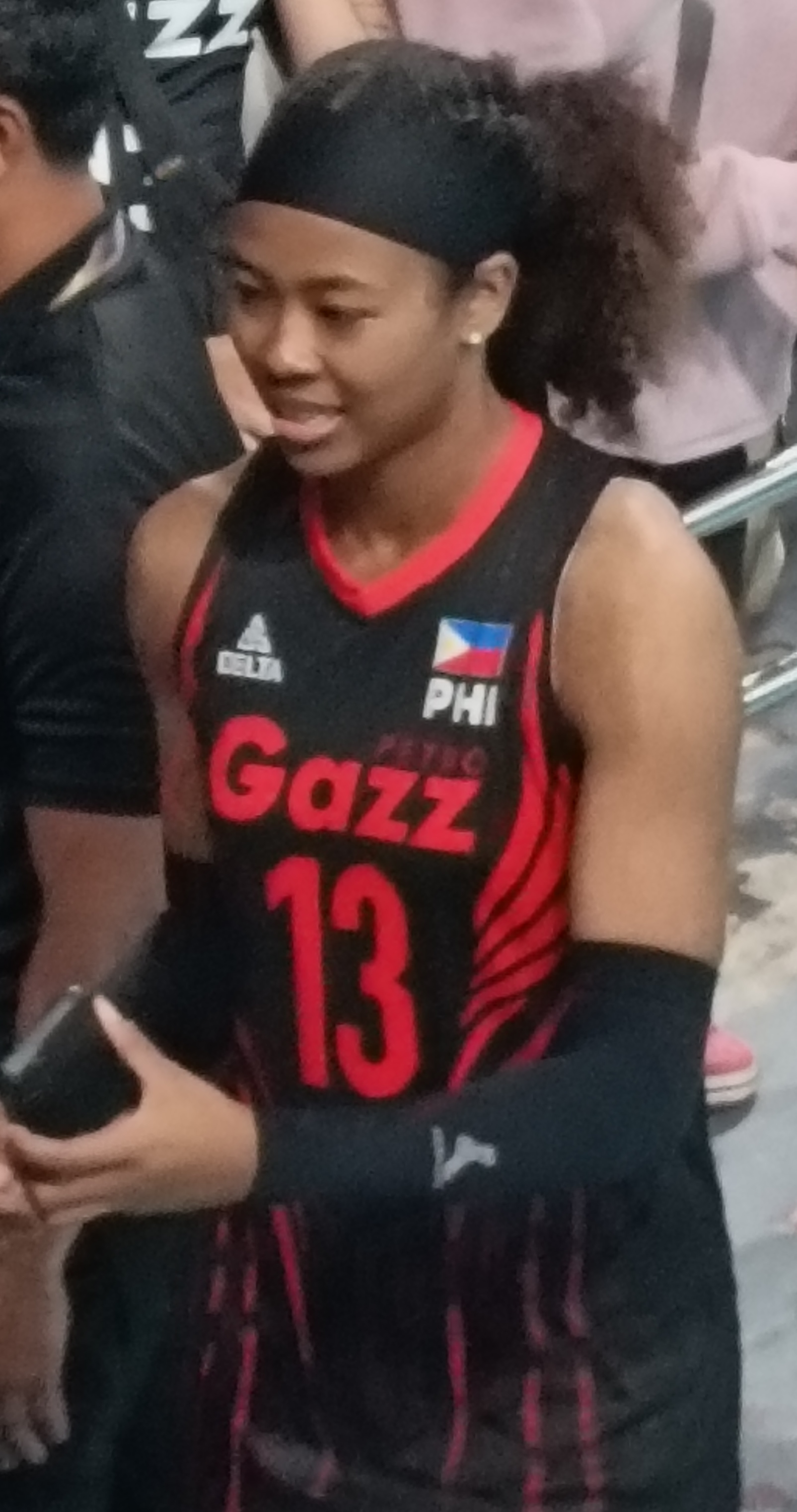
- Philips in 2025

Personal information
- Nationality: United States (Note: Sporting nationality – not to be confused with citizenship status. Phillips is affiliated with USA Volleyball as per the FIVB Player Database.)
- Born: June 15, 1995 (age 31)
- Home town: Carson, California
- Education: Juniata (2013–2016)
- Height: 1.82 m (6 ft 0 in)
- Weight: 75 kg (165 lb)
- Spike: 305 cm (120 in)
- Block: 295 cm (116 in)

Volleyball information
- Position: Opposite hitter, Outside hitter, Middle blocker

Career
- Years: Team
- 2017–2021: Sta. Lucia Lady Realtors
- 2021: Choco Mucho (AVC)
- 2022–2025: Petro Gazz Angels
- 2023–2024: → Gwangju AI Peppers
- 2026–present: Nxled Chameleons

Mar-Jana Phillips (born June 15, 1995) is a Filipino–American professional volleyball player for the Nxled Chameleons of the Premier Volleyball League (PVL).

== Early life and education ==
Mar-Jana Phillips was born on June 15, 1995 to Bobby and Rowena Phillips. She attended the Rolling Hills Preparatory School for her secondary studies and the Juniata College in Huntingdon, Pennsylvania where her program of emphasis was marketing with a secondary emphasis in integrated media arts.

== Career ==
=== High school ===
At Rolling Hills Preparatory, Phillips was a starter for the high school's volleyball team for four years. She was also part of the Power Play and Nfinity volleyball clubs.

=== College ===
From 2013 to 2016, the Juniata College Eagles had Phillips as one of its players.

=== Club ===
Phillips is part of the original Sta. Lucia Lady Realtors which joined the Philippine Super Liga (PSL). She followed Sta. Lucia when they joined the Premier Volleyball League (PVL) in 2021. The team disbanded by the end of the year.

Phillips joined the Petro Gazz Angels of the PVL in January 2022. She transitioned from an opposite spiker to a middle blocker.

Phillips joined the Gwangju AI Peppers of the South Korean V-League which caused her to miss most of the Angel's 2024 All-Filipino Conference stint. The team won the bronze for the tournament.

She missed the entire 2024 Reinforced Conference due to an injury. After recovering, she returned for the 2024-25 All-Filipino Conference

Still affiliated with USA Volleyball, Phillips filled one of the three foreign quota slots for Petro Gazz at the 2025 AVC Women's Volleyball Champions League

=== National team ===
Philips has played for the Philippines women's national team but not in official national teams-based tournaments. She has played for the national team playing under the club name Choco Mucho at the 2021 Asian Women's Club Volleyball Championship. As of May 2024, Philips is the process of switching federations or sporting nationality from United States to the Philippines to enable her to officially play for the national team.

Philips played for the Philippines again at the 2025 VTV International Women's Volleyball Cup.

== Personal life ==
Phillips hails from Carson, California. Her mother, Rowena is a Filipino from Iba, Zambales.

== Awards ==
=== Individual ===
- 2022 PVL Reinforced Conference "1st Best Middle Blocker"
- 2023 Premier Volleyball League First All-Filipino Conference "2nd Best Middle Blocker"
- 2024-25 PVL All-Filipino Conference "Finals MVP"

=== Clubs ===
- 2022 PVL Reinforced Conference - Champions, with Petro Gazz Angels
