= Myla Pablo =

Filipino volleyball player (born 1993)

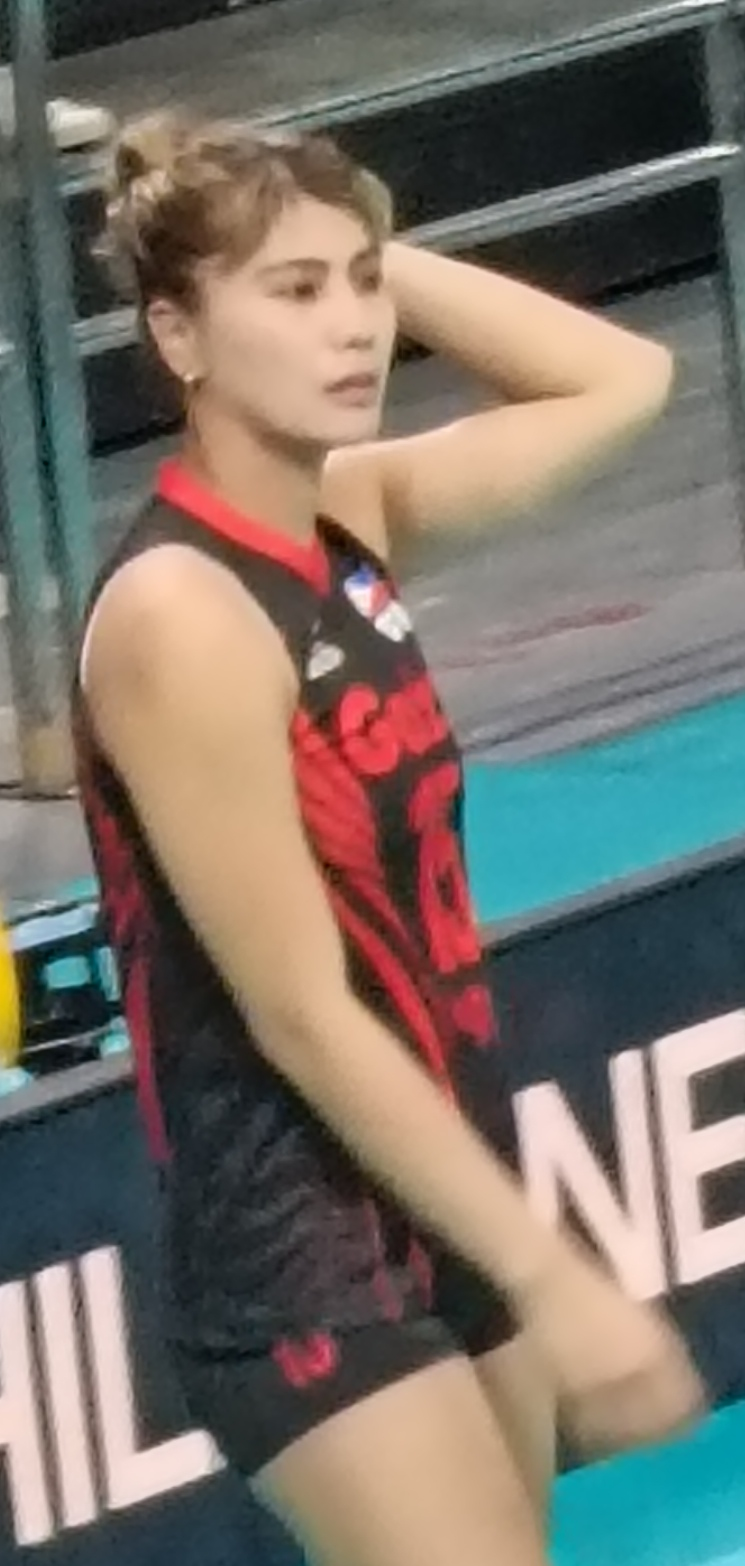
- Pablo in 2025

Personal information
- Nationality: Filipino
- Born: September 12, 1993 (age 33); Tarlac, Philippines
- Height: 1.78 m (5 ft 10 in)
- Weight: 60 kg (130 lb)
- Education: National University

Volleyball information
- Position: Outside hitter

Career
Years	Teams
2015	Philips Gold Lady Slammers
2016–2018	Pocari Sweat Lady Warriors
2019–2020	Motolite Power Builders
2021–2023	Petro Gazz Angels
2023	F2 Logistics Cargo Movers
2024–2025	Petro Gazz Angels
2026–present	Nxled Chameleons

National team
2015	Philippines (U23)
2015	Philippines
- Last updated: January 10, 2026

Myla Pablo (born September 12, 1993), nicknamed Typhoon Pablo, is a Filipino professional volleyball player for the Nxled Chameleons of the Premier Volleyball League (PVL). She was part of the Philippines women's national volleyball team in 2015.

== Personal life ==
Pablo was born on 12 September 1993 in Tarlac. She is 5 ft 10 in (1.78 m) tall and studied in the National University, majoring in Marketing Management.

== Career ==
Pablo was awarded Best Spiker in the UAAP Season 75, playing in 2013 with the NU- Lady Bulldogs. Later, in the 2013 Shakeys V-League Season 10, she also received the season's Best Spiker when the NU Lady Bulldogs won the league championship for the first time.

Pablo ranked seventh with her U23 national team in the 2015 Asian U23 Championship and later helped her senior to team to reach the 12th place in the 2015 Asian Championship. She was also awarded Finals Most Valuable Player from the 2015 Shakeys V-League Collegiate Conference Season 12 title won by the NU Lady Bulldogs. In the 2016 Shakeys V-League Open Conference Season 13 where she was awarded Finals Most Valuable Player and 2nd Best Open Spiker, this time with Pocari Sweat club.

In 2018, at the end of the PVL open conference, Pablo moved to Motolite when they agreed to buy out her contract with Pocari Sweat. In 2021, Motolite released all its player including Pablo, making her a free agent.

== Awards ==
=== Individual ===
- 2013 UAAP Season 75 "Best spiker"
- 2013 Shakeys V-League Season 10 "Best spiker"
- 2015 Shakeys V-League Collegiate Conference Season 12 "Finals Most Valuable Player"
- 2016 Shakeys V-League Open Conference Season 13 "Finals Most Valuable Player"
- 2016 Shakeys V-League Open Conference Season 13 "2nd Best Outside Spiker"
- 2017 Premier Volleyball League 1st Season Reinforced Open Conference "Finals Most Valuable Player"
- 2017 Premier Volleyball League 1st Season Open Conference "1st Best Outside Spiker"
- 2017 Premier Volleyball League 1st Season Open Conference "Conference Most Valuable Player"
- 2018 Premier Volleyball League Reinforced Conference "2nd Best Outside Spiker"
- 2018 Premier Volleyball League Reinforced Conference "Conference Most Valuable Player"
- 2021 Premier Volleyball League Open Conference "2nd Best Outside Spiker"
- 2022 Premier Volleyball League Reinforced Conference "2nd Best Outside Spiker"
- 2025 Premier Volleyball League on Tour "Best Outside Spiker""

=== Team ===
Premier Volleyball League: Petrogazz Angels

Season	Conference	Title
Reinforced	2022	Gold Medalist
Open	2022	Silver Medalist
Open	2021	Bronze Medalist

PNVF Champions League: Petrogazz Angels

Season	Title	Source
2021	Bronze Medalist	
2024	Champion	

Premier V-League: Pocari Sweat Lady Warriors

Season	Conference	Title	Source
2016 (Note: The league was then called Shakey's V-League.)	Open	Champion	
2016	Reinforced	Champion	
2017	Reinforced	Champion	
2017	Open	Runner-up	
2018	Reinforced	4th place	
2018	Open	5th place	

Philippine SuperLiga: Phillips Gold

Season	Conference	Title	Source
2014	Grand Prix	6th place	
2015	All-Filipino	3rd Place	
2015	Grand Prix	3rd place	
