= Ettore Guidetti =

Italian volleyball coach

Personal information
- Nationality: Italian
- Born: 1974 (age 51–52)
- Hometown: Mirandola, Modena, Italy

Coaching information
- Current team: Nxled Chameleons
Previous teams coached
Years	Teams
2019-2020; 2019–2021; 2020–2022; 2022–2023; 2023–2024; 2024–	Talmassons; Sweden (women); RIG; CSM București; Soverato; Nxled Chameleons

Ettore Guidetti is an Italian volleyball coach who is the current head coach of the women's team Nxled Chameleons of the Premier Volleyball League.

== Career ==
Guidetti has coached several teams from Italy, Romania, Poland, and Sweden.

Guidetti started his career as an assistant coach of Spezzano of the Italian Serie A from 1999 to 2001. His first head coach role was with Polisportiva Solierese of Serie A in 2001. He coached various teams in both Serie A and B after that.

=== Sweden women's ===
Guidetti became coach of the Sweden women's national team in 2019. He helped them qualify for the 2021 Women's European Volleyball Championship which is their first in 38 years. He guided Sweden to a fifth place finish in the tournament securing them an outright berth for the next edition in 2023. However, Guidetti left at the end of 2021 after his contract was not renewed.

=== Nxled Chameleons ===
In September 2024, Guidetti was signed in to be the coach for Nxled Chameleons, a women's club in the Philippines' Premier Volleyball League. Guidetti was brought in for his "Italian style" of coaching which he described as treating the sport as "play" rather than "work. He started with the 2024–25 All-Filipino Conference, winning his first game in February 2025 after eight conference loses.

In 2026, and for the first time in their history, Ettore led the Nxled Chameleons team to second place in the "Premier Volleyball League Invitational Conference" tournament, held between August 31 and September 8, 2026.

== Personal life ==
Born in 1974, Guidetti hails from Mirandola. He came from a family of volleyball coaches; his father Gian Paolo and cousin Giovanni were coaches. He is also fluent in English.
