= 2025–26 Capital1 Solar Spikers season =

Filipino women's volleyball team season

The 2025–26 Capital1 Solar Spikers season was the second season of the Capital1 Solar Spikers in the Premier Volleyball League (PVL). During the off-season, Roger Gorayeb was replaced by Philippines women's national team head coach Jorge de Brito.

During the preseason Tour, the Solar Spikers didn't record a single win throughout the conference, eventually losing in the knockout round to the Farm Fresh Foxies.

For the Reinforced Conference, the team signed Ukrainian player Oleksandra Bytsenko as their foreign guest player. The team's losing streak finally came to an end in the Reinforced Conference, recording their first win of 2025 against Nxled on October 16. In the preliminary round, Capital1 finished seventh with an even 4–4 record and 13 points. They would go on to lose to the Zus Coffee Thunderbelles in straight sets in the quarterfinals.

== Roster ==
Capital1 Solar Spikers roster
No.	Nat.	Player	Pos.	Height	DOB	From
1	(Philippines)	Nikka Sophia Ruth Yandoc	Setter	1.61 m (5 ft 3 in)	October 1, 2000 (age 25)	Adamson
2	(Philippines)	Jasmine Nabor	Setter	1.75 m (5 ft 9 in)	July 11, 1998 (age 28)	National-U
3	(Philippines) (Canada)	Rachel Jorvina	Libero	1.64 m (5 ft 5 in)	April 19, 1998 (age 28)	MacEwan
4	(Philippines)	Bella Belen	Outside Hitter	1.72 m (5 ft 8 in)	June 29, 2002 (age 24)	National-U
5	(Philippines)	Ypril Jyrhine Tapia	Outside Hitter	1.62 m (5 ft 4 in)	December 17, 2001 (age 24)	UST
6	(Philippines)	Trisha Genesis	Outside Hitter	1.70 m (5 ft 7 in)	March 20, 2000 (age 26)	Adamson
8	(Philippines)	Ezra Madrigal	Middle Blocker	1.81 m (5 ft 11 in)	December 8, 1999 (age 26)	Far Eastern
9	(Philippines)	Pauline Gaston	Opposite Hitter	1.79 m (5 ft 10 in)	August 27, 1997 (age 28)	Ateneo
10	(Philippines) (United States)	Iris Tolenada	Setter	1.74 m (5 ft 9 in)	August 21, 1991 (age 34)	San Francisco State
11	(Philippines)	Athena Sophia Abbu	Middle Blocker		August 14, 2002 (age 23)	UST
12	(Philippines)	Kecelyn Galdones	Middle Blocker	1.75 m (5 ft 9 in)	July 29, 1999 (age 26)	UST
13	(Philippines)	France Ronquillo	Opposite Hitter	1.72 m (5 ft 8 in)	September 15, 1999 (age 26)	National-U
14	(Philippines)	Jorelle Singh	Outside Hitter	1.70 m (5 ft 7 in)	December 14, 1995 (age 30)	National-U
16	(Philippines)	Sydney Niegos	Opposite Hitter	1.72 m (5 ft 8 in)	September 26, 2000 (age 25)	José Rizal
19	(Philippines)	Roma Mae Doromal (C)	Libero	1.70 m (5 ft 7 in)	July 19, 2000 (age 25)	Ateneo
21	(Philippines)	Ysa Jimenez	Opposite Hitter	1.75 m (5 ft 9 in)	November 8, 1999 (age 26)	UST
22	(Philippines)	Leila Cruz	Opposite Hitter	1.85 m (6 ft 1 in)	February 17, 2000 (age 26)	De La Salle
23	(Philippines)	Shaya Adorador	Outside Hitter	1.72 m (5 ft 8 in)	December 9, 1997 (age 28)	UE
24	(Philippines)	Cherry Nunag	Middle Blocker	1.80 m (5 ft 11 in)	October 22, 1992 (age 33)	De La Salle–Dasmariñas
25	(Philippines)	Rachel Anne Austero	Middle Blocker	1.76 m (5 ft 9 in)	August 3, 1997 (age 28)	St. Benilde

Coaching staff

- Head coach:
  Jorge de Brito
- Assistant coaches:
  Ed Ortega
  Jerome Guhit
  Raquel Lenartowicz
- Statistician:
  Sir Angel Guardian
- Strength & conditioning coach:
  Justin Aquino

Team staff

- Team managers:
  Hollie Reyes
  Arvie Dizon

Medical staff

- Physiotherapist:
  Ivan Bryan Bautista

=== National team players ===
Players who were part of the Philippines women's national team were excluded from playing with the team due to various commitments. This affected the team's roster for the PVL on Tour.

- Bella Belen
- Leila Cruz

== Draft ==
Round	Pick	Player	Pos.	School
1	1	Bella Belen	OH	NU
2	14	Pia Abbu	MB	UST
3	24	Ivy Aquino	MB	AIMS

The Capital1 Solar Spikers selected Bella Belen with the 1st overall pick along with two other draftees in the next two rounds before passing during the fourth round.

== PVL on Tour ==
=== Preliminary round ===
==== Pool B standings ====
Pos	Team	Pld	W	L	Pts	SW	SL	SR	SPW	SPL	SPR	Qualification
2	Creamline Cool Smashers	5	3	2	10	11	8	1.375	441	394	1.119	Final round
3	Chery Tiggo Crossovers	5	3	2	9	12	10	1.200	488	451	1.082	Knockout round
4	Zus Coffee Thunderbelles	5	3	2	7	12	12	1.000	512	503	1.018	Knockout round
5	Akari Chargers	5	2	3	6	9	11	0.818	420	460	0.913	Knockout round
6	Capital1 Solar Spikers	5	0	5	1	3	15	0.200	353	432	0.817	Knockout round

Source: PVL.ph

==== Match log ====
2025 PVL on Tour preliminary round match log
Total: 0–5 (1 point)
June: 0–2 (0 points)

Match	Date	Opponent	Sets	Total	Location Attendance	Record	Pts	Report
1	June 22, 2025	Creamline	0–3	41–75	Chavit Coliseum; 5,569	0–1	0	P2
2	June 23, 2025	Cignal	0–3	59–75	Chavit Coliseum; 5,004	0–2	0	P2

July: 0–3 (1 point)

Match	Date	Opponent	Sets	Total	Location Attendance	Record	Pts	Report
3	July 5, 2025	Chery Tiggo	1–3	86–98	Ynares Center Montalban; 1,094	0–3	0	P2
4	July 6, 2025	Zus Coffee	2–3	96–112	Ynares Center Montalban; 1,203	0–4	1	P2
5	July 15, 2025	Akari	0–3	64–75	Filoil Centre; 953	0–5	1	P2

=== Knockout round ===
==== Match log ====
2025 PVL on Tour knockout round match log
Total: 0–1 (0 points)
Knockout round: 0–1 (0 points)

Date	Opponent	Sets	Total	Location Attendance	Report
August 2, 2025	Farm Fresh	0–3	56–75	City of Dasmariñas Arena	

== Reinforced Conference ==
=== Preliminary round ===
==== Standings ====
Pos	Team	Pld	W	L	Pts	SW	SL	SR	SPW	SPL	SPR	Qualification
5	Petro Gazz Angels	8	5	3	14	17	14	1.214	718	669	1.073	Quarterfinals
6	Cignal Super Spikers	8	5	3	13	16	14	1.143	672	650	1.034	Quarterfinals
7	Capital1 Solar Spikers	8	4	4	13	16	14	1.143	660	688	0.959	Quarterfinals
8	Akari Chargers	8	4	4	12	18	16	1.125	749	731	1.025	Quarterfinals
9	Choco Mucho Flying Titans	8	3	5	9	11	17	0.647	621	660	0.941	

Source: Premier Volleyball League

==== Match log ====
2025 PVL Reinforced Conference preliminary round match log
Total: 4–4 (13 points)
First round: 3–2 (9 points)

Match	Date	Opponent	Sets	Total	Location Attendance	Record	Pts	Report
1 (Note: The result of Capital1's game against Choco Mucho in the PVL Reinforced Conference preliminary round was nullified as the game will be replayed with foreign guest players on November 4.)	October 7, 2025	Choco Mucho	0–3	78–84	Ynares Center Montalban; 2,200	—	—	P2
2	October 13, 2025	PLDT	0–3	65–75	Smart Araneta Coliseum; 1,390	0–1	0	P2
3	October 16, 2025	Nxled	3–1	100–82	Smart Araneta Coliseum; 1,297	1–1	3	P2
4	October 21, 2025	Farm Fresh	1–3	90–97	Smart Araneta Coliseum; 790	1–2	3	P2
5	October 31, 2025	Cignal	3–0	75–67	Filoil Centre; 820	2–2	6	P2
6	November 4, 2025	Choco Mucho	3–0	76–66	SM Mall of Asia Arena; 1,490	3–2	9	P2

Second round: 1–2 (4 points)

Match	Date	Opponent	Sets	Total	Location Attendance	Record	Pts	Report
7	November 11, 2025	Chery Tiggo	2–3	100–112	Filoil Centre; 690	3–3	10	P2
8	November 15, 2025	Petro Gazz	1–3	63–100	Ynares Center Montalban; 810	3–4	10	P2
9	November 20, 2025	Galeries Tower	3–1	91–89	SM Mall of Asia Arena; 690	4–4	13	P2

=== Final round ===
==== Bracket ====
Quarterfinals
November 24
Farm Fresh	0
Akari	3
November 24
Creamline	1
Petro Gazz	3
November 24
Zus Coffee	3
Capital1	0
November 24
PLDT	3
Cignal	1

Semifinals
November 27
Akari	2
Petro Gazz	3
November 27
Zus Coffee	3
PLDT	0

Championship
November 30
Petro Gazz	3
Zus Coffee	1
3rd-place match
November 30
Akari	3
PLDT	2

==== Match log ====
2025 PVL Reinforced Conference final round match log
Total: 0–1 (0 points)
Quarterfinals: 0–1 (0 points)

Date	Opponent	Sets	Total	Location Attendance	Report
November 24, 2025	Zus Coffee	0–3	52–75	Smart Araneta Coliseum; 3,379	P2

== All-Filipino Conference ==
=== Preliminary round ===
==== Standings ====
Pos	Team	Pld	W	L	Pts	SW	SL	SR	SPW	SPL	SPR	Qualification
6	Akari Chargers	9	5	4	15	19	18	1.056	792	838	0.945	Play-in tournament semifinals
7	Choco Mucho Flying Titans	9	4	5	13	19	19	1.000	828	826	1.002	Play-in tournament quarterfinals
8	Capital1 Solar Spikers	9	4	5	10	14	21	0.667	748	796	0.940	Play-in tournament quarterfinals
9	Galeries Tower Highrisers	9	2	7	6	11	24	0.458	707	800	0.884	Play-in tournament quarterfinals
10	Zus Coffee Thunderbelles	9	1	8	3	9	26	0.346	693	819	0.846	Play-in tournament quarterfinals

Source: Premier Volleyball League

==== Match log ====
2026 PVL All-Filipino Conference preliminary round match log
Total: 4–5 (10 points)
February: 3–3 (7 points)

Match	Date	Opponent	Sets	Total	Location Attendance	Record	Pts	Report
1	February 3, 2026	Zus Coffee	3–1	90–77	Filoil Centre; 848	1–0	3	P2
2	February 7, 2026	Nxled	0–3	62–78	Ynares Center Montalban; 536	1–1	3	P2
3	February 12, 2026	PLDT	1–3	78–97	Filoil Centre; 601	1–2	3	P2
4	February 17, 2026	Choco Mucho	3–2	102–99	Filoil Centre; 2,422	2–2	5	P2
5	February 21, 2026	Creamline	0–3	62–76	Filoil Centre; 3,023	2–3	5	P2
6	February 26, 2026	Farm Fresh	3–2	109–111	Filoil Centre; 824	3–3	7	P2

March: 1–2 (3 points)

Match	Date	Opponent	Sets	Total	Location Attendance	Record	Pts	Report
7	March 7, 2026	Akari	1–3	84–92	Filoil Centre; 3,289	0–1	7	P2
8	March 14, 2026	Cignal	0–3	63–75	Filoil Centre; 2,694	0–2	7	P2
9	March 21, 2026	Galeries Tower	3–1	98–91	Filoil Centre; 1,661	1–2	10	P2

=== Play-in tournament ===
==== Pool A ====
Play-in pool A quarterfinal
8	Capital1	0
9	Galeries Tower	3

Play-in pool A semifinal
5	Nxled	3
9	Galeries Tower	0

Play-in pool A final
4	Farm Fresh	3
5	Nxled	0

==== Match log ====
2026 PVL All-Filipino Conference play-in tournament match log
Total: 0–1 (0 points)
Play-in tournament: 0–1 (0 points)

Date	Opponent	Sets	Total	Location Attendance	Report
March 24, 2026	Galeries Tower	0–3	64–80	Filoil Centre; 613	P2

== Transactions ==
=== Additions ===
Player	Date signed	Previous team	Ref.
Pia Abbu	June 8, 2025	UST (UAAP)	
Ivy Aquino	June 11, 2025	AIMS (NCRAA)	
Rachel Austero	June 20, 2025	PLDT High Speed Hitters	
Kecelyn Galdones	June 20, 2025	Petro Gazz Angels	
Jerrili Malabanan	June 20, 2025	Cignal HD Spikers	
Ypril Tapia	June 20, 2025	Zus Coffee Thunderbelles	
Nikka Yandoc	June 20, 2025	Zus Coffee Thunderbelles	
Bella Belen	July 16, 2025	NU (UAAP)	
Shaya Adorador	January 6, 2026	Chery Tiggo EV Crossovers	
Rachel Jorvina	January 6, 2026	Nxled Chameleons	
Ezra Madrigal	January 6, 2026	Akari Chargers	
Jasmine Nabor	January 6, 2026	Chery Tiggo EV Crossovers	
Pauline Gaston	January 7, 2026	Chery Tiggo EV Crossovers	
Ysa Jimenez	January 7, 2026	Galeries Tower Highrisers	
Cherry Nunag	January 7, 2026	Choco Mucho Flying Titans	
France Ronquillo	January 7, 2026	Galeries Tower Highrisers	

=== Subtractions ===
Player	New team	Ref.
Des Clemente-de Guzman	Farm Fresh Foxies	
Heather Guino-o	Cignal HD Spikers	
Bingle Landicho	Free agent	
Rovena Instrella	Free agent	
Katherine Villegas	Free agent	
Patty Orendain	Free agent	
Jennifer Macatuno	Free agent	
Julia Ipac	Free agent	
Rica Jane Rivera	Free agent	
Giliana Torres	Free agent	
Ayumi Furukawa	Free agent	
Shola Alvarez	Galeries Tower Highrisers	

=== Foreign guest player ===
Team	Foreign player	Moving from	Ref.
Capital1 Solar Spikers	(Ukraine) Oleksandra Bytsenko	(Japan) Aranmare Yamagata	

=== Coaching changes ===
Team	Outgoing coach	Manner of departure	Replaced by	Ref
Capital1 Solar Spikers	(Philippines) Roger Gorayeb	Reassigned	(Brazil) Jorge de Brito	
