= 2026–27 Capital1 Solar Spikers season =

Filipino women's volleyball team season

The 2026–27 Capital1 Solar Spikers season will be the third season of the Capital1 Solar Spikers in the Premier Volleyball League (PVL).

The Capital1 Solar Spikers started their campaign in the PVL on Tour, also known as PVL on Tour Showdown in a losing effort, a straight-set loss to the Nxled Chameleons on July 25, 2026 in Vigan, Ilocos Sur. On August 7, 2026, the PVL postponed the August 8, Santiago, Isabela stop doubleheader due to Tropical Depression Maymay, the Solar Spikers supposed to be will play the Creamline Cool Smashers. Capital1 ends it abbreviated tour at 0–2 record after playing one game fewer than the rest of field, a five-set thriller loss to the Farm Fresh Foxies on August 22, 2026 in Victorias City, Negros Occidental.

== Roster ==
Capital1 Solar Spikers roster
No.	Nat.	Player	Pos.	Height	DOB	From
1	(Philippines)	Khy Cepada	Outside Hitter	1.73 m (5 ft 8 in)	July 31, 2003 (age 23)	UE
2	(Philippines)	Jasmine Nabor	Setter	1.75 m (5 ft 9 in)	July 11, 1998 (age 28)	National-U
3	(Philippines) (Canada)	Rachel Jorvina	Libero	1.64 m (5 ft 5 in)	April 19, 1998 (age 28)	MacEwan
4	(Philippines)	Bella Belen	Outside Hitter	1.72 m (5 ft 8 in)	June 29, 2002 (age 24)	National-U
5	(Philippines)	Vanie Gandler	Outside Hitter	1.75 m (5 ft 9 in)	December 5, 2000 (age 25)	Ateneo
6	(Philippines)	Janel Maraguinot	Setter	1.60 m (5 ft 3 in)	July 18, 2000 (age 26)	Ateneo
8	(Philippines)	Ezra Madrigal	Middle Blocker	1.81 m (5 ft 11 in)	December 8, 1999 (age 26)	Far Eastern
9	(Philippines)	Pauline Gaston (C)	Opposite Hitter	1.79 m (5 ft 10 in)	August 27, 1997 (age 29)	Ateneo
11	(Philippines)	Pia Abbu	Middle Blocker	1.72 m (5 ft 8 in)	August 14, 2002 (age 24)	UST
12	(Philippines)	Kecelyn Galdones	Middle Blocker	1.75 m (5 ft 9 in)	July 29, 1999 (age 27)	UST
13	(Philippines)	France Ronquillo	Outside Hitter	1.72 m (5 ft 8 in)	September 15, 1999 (age 27)	National-U
14	(Philippines)	Detdet Pepito	Libero	1.57 m (5 ft 2 in)	October 27, 2002 (age 24)	UST
15	(Philippines)	Julia Coronel	Setter	1.71 m (5 ft 7 in)	October 5, 2001 (age 25)	De La Salle
16	(Philippines)	Sydney Niegos	Opposite Hitter	1.72 m (5 ft 8 in)	September 26, 2000 (age 26)	José Rizal
19	(Philippines)	Roma Doromal	Libero	1.70 m (5 ft 7 in)	July 19, 2000 (age 26)	Ateneo
20	(Philippines)	Mayang Nuique	Opposite Hitter	1.73 m (5 ft 8 in)	July 20, 2002 (age 24)	Adamson
21	(Philippines)	Ysa Jimenez	Outside Hitter	1.75 m (5 ft 9 in)	November 8, 1999 (age 27)	UST
22	(Philippines)	Cherry Nunag	Middle Blocker	1.80 m (5 ft 11 in)	October 22, 1992 (age 34)	De La Salle–Dasmariñas
23	(Philippines)	Shaya Adorador	Outside Hitter	1.72 m (5 ft 8 in)	December 9, 1997 (age 28)	UE
25	(Philippines)	Erika Santos	Opposite Hitter	1.76 m (5 ft 9 in)	May 13, 1998 (age 28)	De La Salle
Updated as of: October 22, 2026 | Source: PVL.ph

Coaching staff

- Head coach:
  Jorge de Brito
- Assistant coaches:
  Ed Ortega
  Jerome Guhit
  Raquel Lenartowicz
- Statistician:
  Joyce Antonniette Palad
- Strength & conditioning coaches:
  Justin Aquino
  Sonny Montalvo

Team staff

- Team manager:
  Hollie Reyes
- Assistant team manager:
  Giliana Torres
- Team coordinator:
  Rosary Pena

Medical staff

- Physiotherapist:
  Hannah De Luna
  Ivan Bryan Bautista

== Draft ==
Round	Pick	Player	Pos.	School
1	2	Detdet Pepito	L	UST
2	9	Khy Cepada	OH	UE

== PVL on Tour ==
=== Results summary ===
Team	Game		
Team	1	2	3
Capital1 (CAP)	NXL; 0–3	CCS; *Aug. 8	FFF; 2–3

Source: Premier Volleyball League
Legend: Blue = win; Red = loss

== All-Filipino Conference ==
=== Preliminary round ===
==== Standings ====
Pos	Team	Pld	W	L	Pts	SW	SL	SR	SPW	SPL	SPR
5	PLDT High Speed Hitters	8	4	4	13	15	15	1.000	677	666	1.017
6	Akari Chargers	8	3	5	9	14	19	0.737	724	745	0.972
7	Capital1 Solar Spikers	8	3	5	7	13	21	0.619	720	761	0.946
8	Zus Coffee Thunderbelles	7	2	5	7	11	18	0.611	591	639	0.925
9	Galeries Tower Highrisers	8	1	7	4	11	23	0.478	683	789	0.866

Updated to match(es) played on November 19, 2026. Source: Premier Volleyball League

==== Match log ====
2026–27 PVL All-Filipino Conference Siklab series preliminary round match log
Total: 3–5 (7 points)
October: 2–3 (5 points)

Match	Date	Opponent	Sets	Total	Location Attendance	Record	Pts	Report
1	October 10, 2026	Choco Mucho	2–3	95–105	SM Seaside Cebu Arena; 12,105	0–1	1	P2
2	October 15, 2026	Akari	3–2	119–110	Ynares Center Antipolo; 740	1–1	3	P2
3	October 20, 2026	Zus Coffee	3–2	107–95	SM Mall of Asia Arena; 385	2–1	5	P2
4	October 24, 2026	PLDT	1–3	88–96	Filoil Centre; 2,243	2–2	5	P2
5	October 29, 2026	Creamline	0–3	63–81	Santiago City Sports Arena; 3,766	2–3	5	P2

November: 1–2 (2 points)

Match	Date	Opponent	Sets	Total	Location Attendance	Record	Pts	Report
6	November 7, 2026	Nxled	0–3	50–75	PhilSports Arena; 1,017	2–4	5	P2
7	November 14, 2026	Farm Fresh	1–3	86–98	PhilSports Arena; 1,095	2–5	5	P2
8	November 19, 2026	Galeries Tower	3–2	112–101	SM Mall of Asia Arena; 408	3–5	7	P2

== Transactions ==
=== Additions ===
Player	Date signed	Previous team	Ref.
Vanie Gandler	May 14, 2026	Cignal Super Spikers	
Erika Santos	May 14, 2026	Cignal Super Spikers	
Janel Maraguinot	May 14, 2026	Nxled Chameleons	
Detdet Pepito	July 7, 2026	UST (UAAP)	
Khy Cepada	July 7, 2026	UE (UAAP)	
Julia Coronel	September 17, 2026	Galeries Tower Highrisers	
Mayang Nuique	September 30, 2026	Nxled Chameleons	

=== Subtractions ===
Player	New team	Ref.
Leila Cruz	PLDT High Speed Hitters	
Iris Tolenada	Farm Fresh Foxies	
