= 2025–26 Chery Tiggo EV Crossovers season =

Sixth season of the Chery Tiggo EV Crossovers; fifth in the PVL

The 2025–26 Chery Tiggo EV Crossovers season was the sixth season of the Chery Tiggo EV Crossovers, fifth in the Premier Volleyball League (PVL), and thirteenth dating back to the original Foton Tornadoes. This was also the final season in the franchise's history following their disbandment on December 2, 2025. As a result, the team didn't participate in the 2026 All-Filipino Conference The team was known as the Chery Tiggo Crossovers before renaming in the Reinforced Conference.

Drawn into Pool B for the PVL on Tour, Chery Tiggo won their first three matches of the prelims. However, losses to Creamline and the Zus Coffee Thunderbelles at the end of the round meant that the Crossovers finished third with a 3–2 record and 9 points, one place behind direct advancement to the final round. They were able to qualify for the final round via their straight set win against the Galeries Tower Highrisers. Chery Tiggo then had a surprise run, upsetting third-seeded Nxled in the quarterfinals in straight sets, then beating second-seeded Cignal in the semifinals to advance to the championship for the first time since the 2021 Open Conference. They faced against the first-seeded PLDT High Speed Hitters, and initially trailed 0–2 in the match before evening the field in the next two sets, tying the match at 2–2. However, they weren't able to complete the reverse sweep, settling for a runner-up finish.

Chery Tiggo qualified for the Invitational Conference, where in the final match of the prelims, they were put in a must-win situation against guest team Kobe Shinwa University, with the winner competing for the championship. Chery Tiggo led the match, 2–0, before Kobe Shinwa completed the reverse sweep which sent the Crossovers to the third-place match against Creamline. The team then lost to the Cool Smashers in straight sets, failing to make the podium.

For the Reinforced Conference, Chery Tiggo signed Cuban Yunieska Batista as their foreign guest player.

== Roster ==
2025–26 Chery Tiggo EV Crossovers roster
No.	Nat.	Player	Pos.	Height	DOB	From
1	(Philippines)	Princess Robles	Outside Hitter	1.60 m (5 ft 3 in)	June 7, 1997 (age 29)	National-U
2	(Philippines)	Abigail Maraño (C)	Middle Blocker	1.75 m (5 ft 9 in)	December 22, 1992 (age 33)	De La Salle
4	(Philippines)	Jasmine Nabor	Setter	1.75 m (5 ft 9 in)	July 11, 1998 (age 28)	National-U
5	(Philippines)	Imee Hernandez	Middle Blocker	1.80 m (5 ft 11 in)	November 6, 2000 (age 25)	UST
7	(Philippines)	Mylene Paat	Opposite Hitter	1.80 m (5 ft 11 in)	April 5, 1994 (age 32)	Adamson
9	(Philippines)	Jennifer Nierva	Libero	1.63 m (5 ft 4 in)	November 8, 1999 (age 26)	National-U
10	(Philippines)	Victonara Galang	Opposite Hitter	1.73 m (5 ft 8 in)	January 4, 1995 (age 31)	De La Salle
11	(Philippines)	Alina Bicar	Setter	1.68 m (5 ft 6 in)	November 17, 1997 (age 28)	UST
12	(Philippines)	Mary Rhose Dapol	Outside Hitter	1.70 m (5 ft 7 in)	December 1, 2000 (age 25)	UPHSD
14	(Philippines)	Renee Lou Peñafiel	Outside Hitter		July 26, 2002 (age 23)	UST
15	(Philippines)	Karen Verdeflor	Libero	1.55 m (5 ft 1 in)	September 24, 2000 (age 25)	Adamson
16	(Philippines)	Cza Carandang	Middle Blocker	1.80 m (5 ft 11 in)	October 11, 1995 (age 30)	Far Eastern
17	(Philippines)	Seth Rodriguez	Middle Blocker	1.79 m (5 ft 10 in)	September 22, 1998 (age 27)	UE
18	(Philippines)	Joyme Cagande	Setter	1.63 m (5 ft 4 in)	February 18, 1999 (age 27)	National-U
20	(Philippines)	Erica Jin Deloria	Opposite Hitter		July 9, 2000 (age 26)	Enderun
21	(Philippines)	Anngela Nunag	Libero	1.60 m (5 ft 3 in)	December 21, 1991 (age 34)	RTU
22	(Philippines)	Ponggay Gaston	Opposite Hitter	1.79 m (5 ft 10 in)	August 27, 1997 (age 28)	Ateneo
23	(Philippines)	Shaya Adorador	Outside Hitter	1.72 m (5 ft 8 in)	December 9, 1997 (age 28)	UE
24	(Philippines)	Reyann Cañete	Outside Hitter		March 8, 2000 (age 26)	San Beda
25	(Cuba)	Yunieska Batista	Outside Hitter	1.85 m (6 ft 1 in)	March 21, 1993 (age 33)	–

Coaching staff

- Head coach:
  (Philippines) Norman Miguel
- Assistant coaches:
  (Philippines) Robertly Boto
  (Philippines) Erickson Ramos
  (Philippines) Kungfu Reyes

Team staff

- Team manager:
  (Philippines) Aaron Vélez
- S&C coach:
  (Philippines) Raf Magno
  (Philippines) Sonny Montalvo
- Physical therapist:
  (Philippines) Cyrine Gonzaga
- Social media manager:
  (Philippines) Daleth Louie Son

Medical staff

- Physical therapist:
  (Philippines) Maco Pili

=== National team players ===
Players who were part of the Philippines women's national team were excluded from playing with the team due to various commitments. This affected the team's roster for both the PVL on Tour and Invitational Conference.

- Jen Nierva

== Draft ==
Round	Pick	Player	Pos.	School
1	8	Baby Jyne Soreño	OP	De La Salle
2	20	Erika Deloria	OH	Enderun
3	26	Renee Peñafiel	OH	UST
4	29	Reyann Cañete	OP	San Beda

== PVL on Tour ==
=== Preliminary round ===
==== Pool B standings ====
Pos	Team	Pld	W	L	Pts	SW	SL	SR	SPW	SPL	SPR	Qualification
1	Cignal HD Spikers	5	4	1	12	13	4	3.250	395	366	1.079	Final round
2	Creamline Cool Smashers	5	3	2	10	11	8	1.375	441	394	1.119	Final round
3	Chery Tiggo Crossovers	5	3	2	9	12	10	1.200	488	451	1.082	Knockout round
4	Zus Coffee Thunderbelles	5	3	2	7	12	12	1.000	512	503	1.018	Knockout round
5	Akari Chargers	5	2	3	6	9	11	0.818	420	460	0.913	Knockout round

Source: PVL.ph

==== Match log ====
2025 PVL on Tour preliminary round match log
Total: 3–2 (9 points)
July: 3–2 (9 points)

Match	Date	Opponent	Sets	Total	Location Attendance	Record	Pts	Report
1	July 5, 2025	Capital1	3–1	98–86	Ynares Center Montalban; 1,094	1–0	3	P2
2	July 6, 2025	Akari	3–2	112–96	Ynares Center Montalban; 1,076	2–0	5	P2
3	July 19, 2025	Cignal	3–1	101–71	City of Passi Arena; 2,374	3–0	8	P2
4	July 20, 2025	Creamline	1–3	80–94	City of Passi Arena; 2,597	3–1	8	P2
5	July 29, 2025	Zus Coffee	2–3	97–102	Candon City Arena; 2,929	3–2	9	P2

=== Knockout round ===
==== Match log ====
2025 PVL on Tour knockout round match log
Total: 1–0 (3 points)
Knockout round: 1–0 (3 points)

Date	Opponent	Sets	Total	Location Attendance	Report
August 2, 2025	Galeries Tower	3–0	75–66	City of Dasmariñas Arena	

=== Final round ===
==== Bracket ====
Quarterfinals
August 7
1 PLDT	3
8 Zus Coffee	0
August 9
4 Creamline	3
5 Farm Fresh	0
August 7
2 Cignal	3
7 Akari	0
August 9
3 Nxled	0
6 Chery Tiggo	3

Semifinals
August 12
PLDT	3
Creamline	2
August 12
Cignal	1
Chery Tiggo	3

Championship
August 17
PLDT	3
Chery Tiggo	2
3rd place match
August 17
Creamline	3
Cignal	0

==== Match log ====
2025 PVL on Tour final round match log
Total: 2–1 (7 points)
Quarterfinals: 1–0 (3 points)

Date	Opponent	Sets	Total	Location Attendance	Report
August 9, 2025	Nxled	3–0	75–52	PhilSports Arena; 2,223	P2

Semifinals: 1–0 (3 points)

Date	Opponent	Sets	Total	Location Attendance	Report
August 12, 2025	Cignal	3–1	91–86	Smart Araneta Coliseum; 2,551	P2

Championship: 0–1 (1 point)

Date	Opponent	Sets	Total	Location Attendance	Report
August 17, 2025	PLDT	2–3	93–108	SM Mall of Asia Arena; 11,055	P2

== Invitational Conference ==
=== Preliminary round ===
==== Standings ====
Pos	Team	Pld	W	L	Pts	SW	SL	SR	SPW	SPL	SPR	Qualification
1	PLDT High Speed Hitters	5	5	0	14	15	3	5.000	434	344	1.262	Championship match
2	Kobe Shinwa University	5	4	1	11	12	7	1.714	442	402	1.100	Championship match
3	Chery Tiggo Crossovers	5	3	2	9	11	9	1.222	430	425	1.012	3rd place match
4	Creamline Cool Smashers	5	2	3	7	11	11	1.000	482	460	1.048	3rd place match
5	Cignal HD Spikers	5	1	4	4	7	13	0.538	398	433	0.919	

Source: Premier Volleyball League

==== Match log ====
2025 PVL Invitational Conference preliminary round match log
Total: 3–2 (9 points)
August: 3–2 (9 points)

Match	Date	Opponent	Sets	Total	Location Attendance	Record	Pts	Report
– (Note: The result of Chery Tiggo's game against Cignal in the PVL on Tour semifinals was carried over to the Invitational Conference preliminary round. It is shown for the purpose of completeness.)	August 12, 2025	Creamline	3–1	91–86	Smart Araneta Coliseum; 2,551	1–0	3	P2
1	August 21, 2025	PLDT	0–3	50–75	PhilSports Arena; 2,627	1–1	3	P2
2	August 23, 2025	Creamline	3–2	112–103	PhilSports Arena; 2,744	2–1	5	P2
3	August 26, 2025	Zus Coffee	3–0	75–57	PhilSports Arena; 968	3–1	8	P2
4	August 29, 2025	Kobe Shinwa	2–3	102–104	Smart Araneta Coliseum; 541	3–2	9	P2

=== Final round ===
==== Match log ====
2025 PVL on Tour final round match log
Total: 0–1 (0 points)
Third-place match: 0–1 (0 points)

Date	Opponent	Sets	Total	Location Attendance	Report
August 31, 2025	Creamline	0–3	50–75	Smart Araneta Coliseum; 2,609	P2

== Reinforced Conference ==
=== Preliminary round ===
==== Standings ====
Pos	Team	Pld	W	L	Pts	SW	SL	SR	SPW	SPL	SPR	Qualification
8	Akari Chargers	8	4	4	12	18	16	1.125	749	731	1.025	Quarterfinals
9	Choco Mucho Flying Titans	8	3	5	9	11	17	0.647	621	660	0.941	
10	Chery Tiggo EV Crossovers	8	2	6	6	12	20	0.600	673	724	0.930	
11	Nxled Chameleons	8	0	8	1	5	24	0.208	576	701	0.822	
12	Galeries Tower Highrisers	8	0	8	0	2	24	0.083	465	635	0.732	

Source: Premier Volleyball League

==== Match log ====
2025 PVL Reinforced Conference preliminary round match log
Total: 2–6 (6 points)
First round: 1–4 (4 points)

Match	Date	Opponent	Sets	Total	Location Attendance	Record	Pts	Report
1	October 11, 2025	Zus Coffee	1–3	83–95	City of Dasmariñas Arena; 3,266	0–1	0	P2
2	October 14, 2025	Akari	2–3	95–108	Smart Araneta Coliseum; 1,286	0–2	1	P2
3	October 18, 2025	Petro Gazz	1–3	84–95	Capital Arena; 6,000	0–3	1	P2
4	October 23, 2025	Galeries Tower	3–0	75–48	Filoil Centre; 574	1–3	4	P2
5	October 28, 2025	Creamline	1–3	88–98	Filoil Centre; 1,643	1–4	4	P2

Second round: 1–2 (2 points)

Match	Date	Opponent	Sets	Total	Location Attendance	Record	Pts	Report
6	November 11, 2025	Capital1	3–2	112–100	Filoil Centre; 690	2–4	6	P2
7	November 15, 2025	PLDT	1–3	69–101	Ynares Center Montalban; 622	2–5	6	P2
8	November 20, 2025	Farm Fresh	0–3	67–79	SM Mall of Asia Arena; 802	2–6	6	P2

== Disbandment ==
In December 2, 2025, Chery Tiggo announced its disbandment.

=== Post-disbandment absorptions ===
Player	New team	Ref.
Princess Robles	December 3, 2025 – Strong Group Athletics (Farm Fresh or Zus Coffee)	
Karen Verdeflor	December 3, 2025 – Strong Group Athletics (Farm Fresh or Zus Coffee)	
Renee Peñafiel	December 3, 2025 – Strong Group Athletics (Farm Fresh or Zus Coffee)	
