= 2024–25 Capital1 Solar Spikers season =

Filipino women's volleyball team season

The 2024–25 Capital1 Solar Spikers season was the inaugural season of the Capital1 Solar Spikers in the Premier Volleyball League (PVL). Capital1 was granted a PVL franchise on January 25, 2024, filling in the slot vacated by the F2 Logistics Cargo Movers. Roger Gorayeb was appointed as inaugural head coach.

Ahead of the 2024–25 All-Filipino Conference, Capital1 acquired former Collegiate Conference MVP Trisha Genesis from the Nxled Chameleons. The team didn't perform well in the All-Filipino Conference, finishing 11th in the prelims and lost in the qualifying round to the Petro Gazz Angels. Drawn into Pool A in the play-in tournament, the team suffered two losses and were eliminated from the conference.

== Roster ==
Capital1 Solar Spikers
No.	Player	Position	Height	Birth date	School
2	(Philippines) Sydney Mae Niegos	Opposite Hitter	1.72 m (5 ft 8 in)	September 26, 2000 (age 25)	JRU
4	(Philippines) Shola Alvarez	Outside Hitter	1.70 m (5 ft 7 in)	July 11, 1997 (age 29)	JRU
5	(Philippines) Lourdes Clemente-De Guzman	Middle Blocker	1.86 m (6 ft 1 in)	May 31, 1996 (age 30)	DLSU
6	(Philippines) Trisha Genesis	Outside Hitter	1.70 m (5 ft 7 in)	March 20, 2000 (age 26)	AdU
7	(Philippines) Mary Antonette Landicho	Libero	1.62 m (5 ft 4 in)	December 7, 1999 (age 26)	NU
8	(Philippines) Jorelle Singh (C)	Outside Hitter	1.70 m (5 ft 7 in)	December 14, 1995 (age 30)	NU
9	(Philippines) Rovena Instrella	Opposite Hitter	1.72 m (5 ft 8 in)	November 30, 1998 (age 27)	DLSU
10	(Philippines) (United States) Iris Tolenada	Setter	1.74 m (5 ft 9 in)	August 21, 1991 (age 34)	SF State
11	(Philippines) Katherine Villegas	Middle Blocker	1.75 m (5 ft 9 in)	April 30, 1995 (age 31)	SSC–R
12	(Philippines) Patty Orendain	Outside Hitter	1.68 m (5 ft 6 in)	July 13, 1994 (age 32)	USLS
14	(Philippines) Jennifer Macatuno	Setter	1.57 m (5 ft 2 in)	May 23, 1992 (age 34)	AdU
15	(Philippines) Heather Anne Guino-o	Outside Hitter	1.70 m (5 ft 7 in)	November 27, 1997 (age 28)	FEU
16	(Philippines) Julia Ipac	Middle Blocker	1.74 m (5 ft 9 in)	July 6, 1997 (age 29)	DLSU
18	(Philippines) Rica Jane Rivera	Libero	1.70 m (5 ft 7 in)	October 4, 1997 (age 28)	UST
19	(Philippines) Roma Mae Doromal	Libero	1.70 m (5 ft 7 in)	July 19, 2000 (age 25)	ADMU
20	(Philippines) Gillianna Jenya Torres	Outside Hitter	1.71 m (5 ft 7 in)	January 17, 2001 (age 25)	DLSU
22	(Philippines) Leila Cruz	Opposite Hitter	1.85 m (6 ft 1 in)	February 17, 2000 (age 26)	DLSU
24	(Philippines) (Japan) Ayumi Furukawa	Opposite Hitter	1.72 m (5 ft 8 in)	April 18, 1999 (aged 25)	ADMU

Coaching staff
Position	Name
Head Coach	(Philippines) Roger Gorayeb
Assistant Coach 1	(Philippines) Clint Malazo
Assistant Coach 2	(Philippines) Ariel Dela Cruz
Strength and Conditioning Coach	(Philippines) Monique Aglipay
Physical Therapist	(Philippines) Jhovy Anne Ague
Physical Therapist	(Philippines) Kristine Flopeno
Team Manager	(Philippines) Hollie Reyes

== 2024 All-Filipino Conference ==
=== Preliminary round ===
==== Standings ====
Pos	Team	Pld	W	L	Pts	SW	SL	SR	SPW	SPL	SPR
8	Nxled Chameleons	11	4	7	11	14	23	0.609	794	824	0.964
9	Farm Fresh Foxies	11	3	8	11	14	24	0.583	785	863	0.910
10	Galeries Tower Highrisers	11	3	8	9	11	26	0.423	689	832	0.828
11	Capital1 Solar Spikers	11	1	10	4	5	31	0.161	631	860	0.734
12	Strong Group Athletics	11	0	11	0	1	33	0.030	532	844	0.630

Source: TeamPilipinas.info

==== Match log ====
2024 PVL All-Filipino Conference preliminary round match log
Total: 1–10 (4 points)
February: 0–2 (0 points)

Match	Date	Opponent	Sets	Total	Location Attendance	Record	Pts	Report
1	February 20, 2024	Chery Tiggo	0–3	36–75	PhilSports Arena; 412	0–1	0	P2
2	February 29, 2024	Farm Fresh	0–3	50–75	PhilSports Arena; 1,516	0–2	0	P2

March: 1–4 (4 points)

Match	Date	Opponent	Sets	Total	Location Attendance	Record	Pts	Report
3	March 5, 2024	Strong Group	3–1	94–83	PhilSports Arena; 181	1–2	3	P2
4	March 9, 2024	PLDT	0–3	44–75	Filoil EcoOil Centre; 644	1–3	3	P2
5	March 16, 2024	Galeries	2–3	99–102	Santa Rosa Sports Complex; 5,129	1–4	4	P2
6	March 21, 2024	Creamline	0–3	47–75	Smart Araneta Coliseum; 1,207	1–5	4	P2
7	March 26, 2024	Petro Gazz	0–3	44–75	PhilSports Arena; 1,091	1–6	4	P2

April: 0–4 (0 points)

Match	Date	Opponent	Sets	Total	Location Attendance	Record	Pts	Report
8	April 6, 2024	Choco Mucho	0–3	52–75	Santa Rosa Sports Complex; 5,444	1–7	4	P2
9	April 11, 2024	Akari	0–3	51–75	PhilSports Arena; 621	1–8	4	P2
10	April 23, 2024	Nxled	0–3	58–75	PhilSports Arena; 1,065	1–9	4	P2
11	April 27, 2024	Cignal	0–3	56–75	PhilSports Arena; 485	1–10	4	P2

== Draft ==
Round	Pick	Player	Pos.	School
1	2	Leila Cruz	OP	DLSU
2	14	Roma Mae Doromal	L	ADMU
3	20	Giliana Torres	OH	DLSU

== Reinforced Conference ==
=== Preliminary round ===
==== Standings ====
Pos	Team	Pld	W	L	Pts	SW	SL	SR	SPW	SPL	SPR	Qualification
5	Chery Tiggo Crossovers	8	5	3	15	18	12	1.500	649	635	1.022	Quarterfinals
6	Petro Gazz Angels	8	5	3	14	17	13	1.308	676	638	1.060	Quarterfinals
7	Capital1 Solar Spikers	8	5	3	13	17	15	1.133	688	677	1.016	Quarterfinals
8	Farm Fresh Foxies	8	3	5	8	11	17	0.647	575	576	0.998	Quarterfinals
9	Choco Mucho Flying Titans	8	2	6	7	11	21	0.524	661	693	0.954	

Source: Premier Volleyball League

==== Match log ====
2024 PVL Reinforced Conference preliminary round match log
Total: 5–3 (13 points)
July: 1–2 (3 points)

Match	Date	Opponent	Sets	Total	Location Attendance	Record	Pts	Report
1	July 18, 2024	Akari	1–3	82–99	PhilSports Arena; 1,676	0–1	0	P2
2	July 23, 2024	Petro Gazz	3–0	76–62	PhilSports Arena; 1,236	1–1	3	P2
3	July 27, 2024	Cignal	1–3	75–98	PhilSports Arena; 887	1–2	3	P2

August: 4–1 (10 points)

Match	Date	Opponent	Sets	Total	Location Attendance	Record	Pts	Report
4	August 1, 2024	Choco Mucho	3–2	96–104	PhilSports Arena; 1,138	2–2	5	P2
5	August 6, 2024	Zus Coffee	3–1	93–82	PhilSports Arena; 1,295	3–2	8	P2
6	August 10, 2024	Nxled	3–2	105–91	PhilSports Arena; 603	4–2	10	P2
7	August 15, 2024	Farm Fresh	0–3	60–75	PhilSports Arena; 382	4–3	10	P2
8	August 20, 2024	Galeries Tower	3–1	101–84	Filoil EcoOil Centre; 380	5–3	13	P2

=== Final round ===
==== Bracket ====
Quarterfinals
August 24
1 Akari	3
8 Farm Fresh	1
August 27
4 PLDT	3
5 Chery Tiggo	2
August 24
2 Cignal	3
7 Capital1	2
August 27
3 Creamline	3
6 Petro Gazz	0

Semifinals
August 31
Akari	3
PLDT	2
August 31
Cignal	2
Creamline	3

Championship
September 4
Akari	0
Creamline	3
3rd place match
September 4
PLDT	1
Cignal	3

==== Match log ====
2024 PVL Reinforced Conference final round match log
Total: 0–1 (1 points)
Quarterfinals: 0–1 (1 points)

Date	Opponent	Sets	Total	Location Attendance	Report
August 24, 2024	Cignal	2–3	115–114	Filoil EcoOil Centre; 1,225	P2

== 2024–25 All-Filipino Conference ==
=== Preliminary round ===
==== Standings ====
Pos	Team	Pld	W	L	Pts	SW	SL	SR	SPW	SPL	SPR	Qualification
8	Chery Tiggo Crossovers	11	5	6	14	20	24	0.833	957	966	0.991	Qualifying round
9	Zus Coffee Thunderbelles	11	4	7	14	20	23	0.870	958	962	0.996	Qualifying round
10	Galeries Tower Highrisers	11	1	10	5	10	30	0.333	835	949	0.880	Qualifying round
11	Capital1 Solar Spikers	11	1	10	5	8	31	0.258	754	926	0.814	Qualifying round
12	Nxled Chameleons	11	1	10	4	9	31	0.290	817	952	0.858	Qualifying round

Source: Premier Volleyball League

==== Match log ====
2024–25 PVL All-Filipino Conference preliminary round match log
Total: 1–10 (5 points)
November: 1–3 (4 points)

Match	Date	Opponent	Sets	Total	Location Attendance	Record	Pts	Report
1	November 12, 2024	Chery Tiggo	2–3	102–107	PhilSports Arena; 777	0–1	1	P2
2	November 21, 2024	Choco Mucho	1–3	81–102	Filoil EcoOil Centre; 1,258	0–2	1	P2
3	November 26, 2024	PLDT	0–3	54–75	PhilSports Arena; 291	0–3	1	P2
4	November 30, 2024	Nxled	3–1	96–79	PhilSports Arena; 577	1–3	4	P2

December: 0–1 (0 points)

Match	Date	Opponent	Sets	Total	Location Attendance	Record	Pts	Report
5	December 7, 2024	Galeries Tower	0–3	61–76	Minglanilla Sports Complex; 5,520	1–4	4	P2

January: 0–2 (0 points)

Match	Date	Opponent	Sets	Total	Location Attendance	Record	Pts	Report
6	January 21, 2024	Creamline	0–3	56–75	PhilSports Arena; 1,713	1–5	4	P2
7	January 25, 2025	Zus Coffee	0–3	59–81	PhilSports Arena; 850	1–6	4	P2

February: 0–4 (1 point)

Match	Date	Opponent	Sets	Total	Location Attendance	Record	Pts	Report
8	February 1, 2025	Akari	0–3	50–76	PhilSports Arena; 2,667	1–7	4	P2
9	February 6, 2025	Cignal	0–3	44–75	PhilSports Arena; 2,525	1–8	4	P2
10	February 11, 2025	Petro Gazz	0–3	46–75	PhilSports Arena; 1,069	1–9	4	P2
11	February 18, 2025	Farm Fresh	2–3	105–105	City of Passi Arena; 878	1–10	5	P2

=== Qualifying round ===
==== Match log ====
2024–25 PVL All-Filipino Conference qualifying round match log
Total: 0–1 (0 points)
Qualifying round: 0–1 (0 points)

Date	Opponent	Sets	Total	Location Attendance	Report
March 1, 2025	Petro Gazz	0–3	63–75	PhilSports Arena; 1,960	P2

=== Play-in tournament ===
==== Pool A standings ====
Pos	Team	Pld	W	L	Pts	SW	SL	SR	SPW	SPL	SPR	Qualification
1	Zus Coffee Thunderbelles	2	2	0	5	6	3	2.000	200	186	1.075	Final round
2	Cignal HD Spikers	2	1	1	4	5	4	1.250	202	185	1.092	
3	Capital1 Solar Spikers	2	0	2	0	2	6	0.333	159	190	0.837	

Source: Premier Volleyball League

==== Match log ====
2024–25 PVL All-Filipino Conference play-in tournament match log
Total: 0–2 (0 points)
Play-in tournament: 0–2 (0 points)

Match	Date	Opponent	Sets	Total	Location Attendance	Record	Pts	Report
1	March 6, 2025	Cignal	1–3	78–97	PhilSports Arena; 614	0–1	0	P2
2	March 13, 2025	Zus Coffee	1–3	81–93	PhilSports Arena; 480	0–2	0	P2

== Transactions ==
=== Additions ===
Player	Date signed	Previous team	Ref.
Cathrina Dizon	February 1, 2024	Benilde Lady Blazers (NCAA)	
Jorelle Singh	February 1, 2024	Biñan Tatak Gel (MPVA)	
May Macatuno	February 1, 2024	Biñan Tatak Gel (MPVA)	
Arianne Mae Layug	February 1, 2024	Cignal HD Spikers	
Bingle Landicho	February 1, 2024	Chery Tiggo Crossovers	
Rovena Andrea Instrella	February 1, 2024	F2 Logistics Cargo Movers	
Renesa Melgar	February 1, 2024	Galeries Tower Highrisers	
Sydney Mae Niegos	February 1, 2024	Marikina Lady Shoemasters (MPVA)	
Rica Jane Rivera	February 1, 2024	Nasipit Lady Spikers (MPVA)	
Janine Navarro	February 1, 2024	Nxled Chameleons	
Heather Anne Guino-o	February 1, 2024	Petro Gazz Angels	
Ma. Lourdes Clemente	February 1, 2024	Petro Gazz Angels	
Katherine Villegas	February 1, 2024	PLDT Home Fibr Power Hitters	
Shyra Mae Umandal	February 1, 2024	Quezon City Gerflor Defenders	
Aiko Sweet Urdas	February 1, 2024	United Auctioneers Army	
Janine Lana	February 1, 2024	UE Lady Red Warriors (UAAP)	
Jhudelle Quizon	February 1, 2024	UE Lady Red Warriors (UAAP)	
Iris Tolenada	June 27, 2024	GS Caltex Seoul Kixx (South Korean V-League)	
Shola Alvarez	June 27, 2024	Galeries Tower Highrisers	
Norielle Ipac	June 27, 2024	Galeries Tower Highrisers	
Ayumi Furukawa	June 27, 2024	Strong Group Athletics	
Leila Cruz	July 12, 2024	De La Salle Lady Spikers (UAAP)	
Roma Mae Doromal	July 12, 2024	Ateneo Blue Eagles (UAAP)	
Giliana Torres	July 12, 2024	De La Salle Lady Spikers (UAAP)	
Trisha Genesis	November 1, 2024	Nxled Chameleons	

=== Subtractions ===
Player	New team	Ref.
Cathrina Dizon	Free agent	
Arianne May Layug	Free agent	
Renesa Melgar	Free agent	
Janine Navarro	Free agent	
Shyra Mae Umandal	Free agent	
Aiko Sweet Urdas	Free agent	
Janine Lana	Free agent	
Jhudelle Quizon	Free agent	

=== Foreign guest player ===
Team	Foreign player	Moving from	Ref.
Capital1 Solar Spikers	(Russia) Marina Tushova	(Russia) Sparta Nizhny Novgorod	
