= 2025–26 Choco Mucho Flying Titans season =

Filipino women's volleyball team season

The 2025–26 Choco Mucho Flying Titans season was the sixth season of the Choco Mucho Flying Titans in the Premier Volleyball League (PVL).

Ahead of the preseason PVL on Tour, Maika Ortiz departed for the Zus Coffee Thunderbelles. In the prelims, Choco Mucho won their first match against the Galeries Tower Highrisers. It would end up being the only match they won, as they finished the prelims with a 1–4 record and only three points. In the knockout round, the team was leading, 2–0, in their match against Zus Coffee, but ended up losing in a reverse sweep and was thus eliminated from final round contention.

For the Reinforced Conference, the team signed Anyse Smith as their foreign guest player.

On December 29, 2025, the team released four players which included Cherry Nunag and Royse Tubino from their roster, making way for their new acquisitions on January 1, 2026, highlighted by the returning Eya Laure.

== Roster ==
Choco Mucho Flying Titans roster
No.	Nat.	Player	Pos.	Height	DOB	From
1	(Philippines)	Isa Molde	Outside Hitter	1.70 m (5 ft 7 in)	October 18, 1998 (age 28)	UP
2	(Philippines)	Desiree Cheng (C)	Outside Hitter	1.73 m (5 ft 8 in)	September 28, 1996 (age 30)	De La Salle
3	(Philippines)	Deanna Wong	Setter	1.73 m (5 ft 8 in)	July 18, 1998 (age 28)	Ateneo
4	(Philippines)	Mean Mendrez	Outside Hitter	1.78 m (5 ft 10 in)	November 14, 1998 (age 27)	UE
6	(Philippines)	Dindin Santiago-Manabat	Opposite Hitter	1.88 m (6 ft 2 in)	September 26, 1993 (age 33)	National-U
7	(Philippines)	Maddie Madayag	Middle Blocker	1.80 m (5 ft 11 in)	February 7, 1998 (age 28)	Ateneo
8	(Philippines)	Eya Laure	Outside Hitter	1.78 m (5 ft 10 in)	March 21, 1999 (age 27)	UST
9	(Philippines)	Alina Bicar	Setter	1.68 m (5 ft 6 in)	November 17, 1997 (age 28)	UST
10	(Philippines) (Canada)	Kat Tolentino	Opposite Hitter	1.85 m (6 ft 1 in)	January 27, 1995 (age 31)	Ateneo
11	(Philippines)	Ayesha Taira Juegos	Opposite Hitter	1.70 m (5 ft 7 in)	September 14, 2002 (age 24)	Adamson
12	(Philippines)	Jem Ferrer	Setter	1.57 m (5 ft 2 in)	December 12, 1991 (age 34)	Ateneo
14	(Philippines)	Jen Kylene Villegas	Middle Blocker	1.75 m (5 ft 9 in)	June 20, 2002 (age 24)	Adamson
15	(Philippines)	Jai Atienza	Middle Blocker	1.80 m (5 ft 11 in)	November 9, 1999 (age 27)	UP
16	(Philippines)	Thang Ponce	Libero	1.57 m (5 ft 2 in)	October 21, 1998 (age 28)	Adamson
17	(Philippines)	Lorraine Pecaña	Middle Blocker	1.81 m (5 ft 11 in)	April 21, 2001 (age 25)	Arellano
18	(Philippines)	Sisi Rondina	Outside Hitter	1.68 m (5 ft 6 in)	September 4, 1996 (age 30)	UST
20	(Philippines) (United States)	Tia Andaya	Setter	1.75 m (5 ft 9 in)	December 27, 2000 (age 25)	Central Washington
21	(Philippines)	Regine Arocha	Libero	1.71 m (5 ft 7 in)	February 21, 1997 (age 29)	Arellano
24	(Philippines)	Caitlin Viray	Opposite Hitter	1.72 m (5 ft 8 in)	April 12, 1998 (age 28)	UST

Coaching staff

- Head coach:
  Dante Alinsunurin
- Assistant coaches:
  Edjet Mabbayad
  Jessie Lopez
- Statistician:
  Jann Paulo Ancheta
  Aries Lim
- Strength & conditioning coach:
  Allan Jovero

Team staff

- Team manager:
  Eric Cuatico
- Team coordinator:
  Kris Alcantara

Medical staff

- Physical therapist:
  Bethel Solano

=== National team players ===
Players who were part of the Philippines women's national team were excluded from playing with the team due to various commitments. This affected the team's roster for the PVL on Tour.

- Tia Andaya
- Maddie Madayag

== Draft ==
Round	Pick	Player	Pos.	School
1	7	Tia Andaya	S	Central Washington
2	19	Kylene Villegas	MB	Adamson

== PVL on Tour ==
=== Preliminary round ===
==== Pool A standings ====
Pos	Team	Pld	W	L	Pts	SW	SL	SR	SPW	SPL	SPR	Qualification
2	Nxled Chameleons	5	4	1	11	12	6	2.000	408	381	1.071	Final round
3	Farm Fresh Foxies	5	3	2	9	9	7	1.286	359	371	0.968	Knockout round
4	Petro Gazz Angels	5	2	3	7	8	10	0.800	390	406	0.961	Knockout round
5	Choco Mucho Flying Titans	5	1	4	3	7	13	0.538	439	481	0.913	Knockout round
6	Galeries Tower Highrisers	5	0	5	0	1	15	0.067	335	386	0.868	Knockout round

Source: PVL.ph

==== Match log ====
2025 PVL on Tour preliminary round match log
Total: 1–4 (3 points)
June: 1–1 (3 points)

Match	Date	Opponent	Sets	Total	Location Attendance	Record	Pts	Report
1	June 28, 2025	Galeries Tower	3–1	88–86	Batangas City Sports Center; 2,437	1–0	3	P2
2	June 29, 2025	Nxled	1–3	95–103	Batangas City Sports Center; 3,340	1–1	3	P2

July: 0–3 (0 points)

Match	Date	Opponent	Sets	Total	Location Attendance	Record	Pts	Report
3	July 12, 2025	Farm Fresh	1–3	91–99	Capital Arena; 4,889	1–2	3	P2
4	July 13, 2025	PLDT	1–3	80–97	Capital Arena; 7,693	1–3	3	P2
5	July 29, 2025	Petro Gazz	1–3	85–96	Candon City Arena; 3,919	1–4	3	P2

=== Knockout round ===
==== Match log ====
2025 PVL on Tour knockout round match log
Total: 0–1 (1 point)
Knockout round: 0–1 (1 point)

Date	Opponent	Sets	Total	Location Attendance	Report
August 5, 2025	Zus Coffee	2–3	93–107	PhilSports Arena; 1,243	P2

== Reinforced Conference ==
=== Preliminary round ===
==== Standings ====
Pos	Team	Pld	W	L	Pts	SW	SL	SR	SPW	SPL	SPR	Qualification
7	Capital1 Solar Spikers	8	4	4	13	16	14	1.143	660	688	0.959	Quarterfinals
8	Akari Chargers	8	4	4	12	18	16	1.125	749	731	1.025	Quarterfinals
9	Choco Mucho Flying Titans	8	3	5	9	11	17	0.647	621	660	0.941	
10	Chery Tiggo EV Crossovers	8	2	6	6	12	20	0.600	673	724	0.930	
11	Nxled Chameleons	8	0	8	1	5	24	0.208	576	701	0.822	

Source: Premier Volleyball League

==== Match log ====
2025 PVL Reinforced Conference preliminary round match log
Total: 3–5 (9 points)
First round: 2–3 (6 points)

Match	Date	Opponent	Sets	Total	Location Attendance	Record	Pts	Report
1 (Note: The result of Choco Mucho's game against Capital1 in the PVL Reinforced Conference preliminary round was nullified as the game will be replayed with foreign guest players on November 4.)	October 7, 2025	Capital1	3–0	84–78	Ynares Center Montalban; 2,200	—	—	P2
2	October 13, 2025	Cignal	3–1	100–85	Smart Araneta Coliseum; 1,800	1–0	3	P2
3	October 16, 2025	PLDT	0–3	60–75	Smart Araneta Coliseum; 1,867	1–1	3	P2
4	October 21, 2025	Nxled	3–0	75–64	Smart Araneta Coliseum; 1,241	2–1	6	P2
5	October 31, 2025	Farm Fresh	1–3	80–94	Filoil Centre; 2,278	2–2	6	P2
6	November 4, 2025	Capital1	0–3	66–76	SM Mall of Asia Arena; 1,490	2–3	6	P2

Second round: 1–2 (3 points)

Match	Date	Opponent	Sets	Total	Location Attendance	Record	Pts	Report
7	November 8, 2025	Zus Coffee	1–3	87–99	Candon City Arena; 2,561	2–4	6	P2
8	November 13, 2025	Creamline	0–3	57–75	Smart Araneta Coliseum; 4,117	2–5	6	P2
9	November 18, 2025	Akari	3–1	96–92	Ynares Center Montalban; 2,226	3–5	9	P2

== All-Filipino Conference ==
=== Preliminary round ===
==== Standings ====
Pos	Team	Pld	W	L	Pts	SW	SL	SR	SPW	SPL	SPR	Qualification
5	Nxled Chameleons	9	5	4	15	20	16	1.250	810	773	1.048	Play-in tournament semifinals
6	Akari Chargers	9	5	4	15	19	18	1.056	792	838	0.945	Play-in tournament semifinals
7	Choco Mucho Flying Titans	9	4	5	13	19	19	1.000	828	826	1.002	Play-in tournament quarterfinals
8	Capital1 Solar Spikers	9	4	5	10	14	21	0.667	748	796	0.940	Play-in tournament quarterfinals
9	Galeries Tower Highrisers	9	2	7	6	11	24	0.458	707	800	0.884	Play-in tournament quarterfinals

Source: Premier Volleyball League

==== Match log ====
2026 PVL All-Filipino Conference preliminary round match log
Total: 4–5 (13 points)
January: 1–0 (3 points)

Match	Date	Opponent	Sets	Total	Location Attendance	Record	Pts	Report
1	January 31, 2026	Akari	3–0	75–60	Filoil Centre; 2,754	1–0	3	P2

February: 1–3 (3 points)

Match	Date	Opponent	Sets	Total	Location Attendance	Record	Pts	Report
2	February 5, 2026	Cignal	1–3	82–91	Filoil Centre; 2,717	0–1	3	P2
3	February 10, 2026	Creamline	1–3	86–94	SM Mall of Asia Arena; 12,571	0–2	3	P2
4	February 17, 2026	Capital1	2–3	99–102	Filoil Centre; 2,422	0–3	4	P2
5	February 26, 2026	Galeries Tower	3–2	108–99	Filoil Centre; 1,092	1–3	6	P2

March: 2–2 (7 points)

Match	Date	Opponent	Sets	Total	Location Attendance	Record	Pts	Report
6	March 3, 2026	Nxled	3–1	96–95	Filoil Centre; 1,450	1–0	9	P2
7	March 10, 2026	Farm Fresh	2–3	99–102	Filoil Centre; 897	1–1	10	P2
8	March 14, 2026	PLDT	1–3	84–98	Filoil Centre; 2,409	1–2	10	P2
9	March 19, 2026	Zus Coffee	3–1	99–85	Filoil Centre; 984	2–2	13	P2

=== Play-in tournament ===
==== Pool B ====
Play-in pool B quarterfinal
7	Choco Mucho	3
10	Zus Coffee	2

Play-in pool B semifinal
6	Akari	3
7	Choco Mucho	2

Play-in pool B final
3	Creamline	3
6	Akari	1

==== Match log ====
2026 PVL All-Filipino Conference play-in tournament match log
Total: 1–1 (3 points)
Play-in tournament: 1–1 (3 points)

Match	Date	Opponent	Sets	Total	Location Attendance	Record	Pts	Report
1	March 24, 2026	Zus Coffee	3–2	99–94	Filoil Centre; 932	1–0	2	P2
2	March 28, 2026	Akari	2–3	100–109	Ninoy Aquino Stadium; 2,388	1–1	3	P2

== Transactions ==
=== Additions ===
Player	Date signed	Previous team	Ref.
Tia Andaya	June 9, 2025	CSM Lugoj (Romanian V-League)	
Kylene Villegas	June 9, 2025	Adamson Lady Falcons (UAAP)	
Ayesha Juegos	June 21, 2025	Adamson Lady Falcons (UAAP)	
Jaila Atienza	January 1, 2026	Nxled Chameleons	
Alina Bicar	January 1, 2026	Chery Tiggo EV Crossovers	
Eya Laure	January 1, 2026	Chery Tiggo EV Crossovers	
Caitlin Viray	January 1, 2026	Farm Fresh Foxies	

=== Subtractions ===
Player	New team	Ref.
Marionne Alba	Akari Chargers	
Bia General	Strong Group Athletics (organization-wide)	
Cherry Nunag	Capital1 Solar Spikers	
Aduke Ogunsanya	Nxled Chameleons	
Maika Ortiz	Zus Coffee Thunderbelles	
Royse Tubino	Strong Group Athletics (organization-wide)	
