= 2026 Capital1 Solar Spikers season =

The 2026 Capital1 Solar Spikers season may refer to:

- 2025–26 Capital1 Solar Spikers season
- 2026–27 Capital1 Solar Spikers season
