= 2026 Premier Volleyball League All-Filipino Conference =

First conference of the 2026 PVL season

- Duration: January 31 – April 23, 2026
- Teams: 10
- TV partner(s): One Sports; One Sports+
- Streaming partner(s): Pilipinas Live

Results
- Champions: Creamline Cool Smashers
- Runners-up: Cignal Super Spikers
- Third place: PLDT High Speed Hitters
- Fourth place: Farm Fresh Foxies

Awards
- Conference MVP: Vanie Gandler
- Finals MVP: Bernadeth Pons
- Best OH: Bella Belen; Brooke Van Sickle
- Best MB: Jeanette Panaga; Riza Nogales
- Best OPP: Trisha Tubu
- Best Setter: Gel Cayuna
- Best Libero: Kath Arado

PVL All-Filipino Conference chronology
- < 2024–25 2026–27 >

PVL conference chronology
- < 2025 Reinforced 2026 Invitational >
- 2026 PVL on Tour (preseason) >

The 2026 Premier Volleyball League All-Filipino Conference was the third conference of the 2025–26 Premier Volleyball League season, the fourth and final tournament of the season, and the tenth running of the All-Filipino Conference. The tournament began on January 31 and ended on April 23, 2026.

Ten teams are taking part in this tournament with two teams from the previous conference departing from the PVL. The Chery Tiggo Crossovers disbanded in December 2025 while the Petro Gazz Angels took a leave of absence in January 2026 after their merger with the Nxled Chameleons was disallowed by the league. Petro Gazz would have been the defending All-Filipino Conference champions entering this conference.

In the finals, the Creamline Cool Smashers beat the Cignal Super Spikers in two matches to win their 11th title, their first since their 2024 Grand Slam season.

== Teams ==
2026 Premier Volleyball League All-Filipino Conference teams
Abbr.	Team	Affiliation	Head coach	Team captain
AKA	Akari Chargers	Akari Lighting & Technology	(Philippines) Tina Salak	Justine Jazareno
CAP	Capital1 Solar Spikers	CapitalOne Energy Corp.	(Brazil) Jorge de Brito	Roma Mae Doromal
CMF	Choco Mucho Flying Titans	Republic Biscuit Corporation	(Philippines) Dante Alinsunurin	Desiree Cheng
CSS	Cignal Super Spikers	Cignal TV, Inc.	(Philippines) Shaq Delos Santos	Gel Cayuna
CCS	Creamline Cool Smashers	Republic Biscuit Corporation	(Philippines) Sherwin Meneses	Alyssa Valdez
FFF	Farm Fresh Foxies	Farm Fresh Philippine International / Strong Group Athletics	(Japan) Koji Tsuzurabara	Louie Romero
GTH	Galeries Tower Highrisers	Grand Taipan Land Development	(Philippines) Aying Esteban	Julia Coronel
NXL	Nxled Chameleons	Akari Lighting & Technology	(Italy) Ettore Guidetti	Brooke Van Sickle
HSH	PLDT High Speed Hitters	PLDT Inc.	(Philippines) Rald Ricafort	Kath Arado
ZUS	Zus Coffee Thunderbelles	Zuspresso Sdn. Bhd. / Strong Group Athletics	(Philippines) Jerry Yee	Cloanne Mondoñedo

== Venues ==
Regular venues

Prelims, Semifinals	Prelims, Play-ins, Semifinals	Play-ins	Qualifying, Finals
Pasay	San Juan	Manila	Quezon City
SM Mall of Asia Arena (MOA)	Filoil Centre (FIL)	Ninoy Aquino Stadium (NAS)	Smart Araneta Coliseum (SAC)
Capacity: 20,000	Capacity: 6,000	Capacity: 6,000	Capacity: 20,000

PVL on Tour

Preliminary round
Antipolo, Rizal	Rodriguez, Rizal	Santa Rosa, Laguna
Ynares Center Antipolo (YCA)	Ynares Center Montalban (YC2)	Santa Rosa Sports Complex (SRSC)
Capacity: 7,400	Capacity: 8,000	Capacity: 5,700

== Transactions ==
=== Transfers ===
The following are players who transferred to another team from their 2025 Reinforced Conference team.

Player	Previous team	New team	Ref.
Judith Abil	Cignal Super Spikers	Akari Chargers	
Cza Carandang	Chery Tiggo EV Crossovers	Akari Chargers	
Mary Rhose Dapol	Chery Tiggo EV Crossovers	Akari Chargers	
Jyne Soreño	Chery Tiggo EV Crossovers	Akari Chargers	
Ezra Madrigal	Akari Chargers	Capital1 Solar Spikers	
Shaya Adorador	Chery Tiggo EV Crossovers	Capital1 Solar Spikers	
Pauline Gaston	Chery Tiggo EV Crossovers	Capital1 Solar Spikers	
Jasmine Nabor	Chery Tiggo EV Crossovers	Capital1 Solar Spikers	
Cherry Nunag	Choco Mucho Flying Titans	Capital1 Solar Spikers	
Ysa Jimenez	Galeries Tower Highrisers	Capital1 Solar Spikers	
France Ronquillo	Galeries Tower Highrisers	Capital1 Solar Spikers	
Rachel Jorvina	Nxled Chameleons	Capital1 Solar Spikers	
Alina Bicar	Chery Tiggo EV Crossovers	Choco Mucho Flying Titans	
Caitlin Viray	Farm Fresh Foxies	Choco Mucho Flying Titans	
Jaila Atienza	Nxled Chameleons	Choco Mucho Flying Titans	
Ivy Perez	Galeries Tower Highrisers	Cignal Super Spikers	
Jen Nierva	Chery Tiggo EV Crossovers	Creamline Cool Smashers	
Bia General	Choco Mucho Flying Titans	Farm Fresh Foxies (Note: The player was initially signed to the Strong Group Athletics organization before being given their team assignments.)	
Royse Tubino	Choco Mucho Flying Titans	Farm Fresh Foxies	
Ara Galang	Chery Tiggo EV Crossovers	Farm Fresh Foxies	
Imee Hernandez	Chery Tiggo EV Crossovers	Farm Fresh Foxies	
Mylene Paat	Chery Tiggo EV Crossovers	Farm Fresh Foxies	
Remy Palma	Petro Gazz Angels	Farm Fresh Foxies	
Erika Raagas	Akari Chargers	Galeries Tower Highrisers	
Camille Victoria	Akari Chargers	Galeries Tower Highrisers	
Shola Alvarez	Capital1 Solar Spikers	Galeries Tower Highrisers	
Erika Deloria	Chery Tiggo EV Crossovers	Galeries Tower Highrisers	
Jules Samonte	Chery Tiggo EV Crossovers	Galeries Tower Highrisers	
Lycha Ebon	Nxled Chameleons	Galeries Tower Highrisers	
Maji Mangulabnan	Nxled Chameleons	Galeries Tower Highrisers	
Blove Barbon	Petro Gazz Angels	Galeries Tower Highrisers	
Aiza Maizo-Pontillas	Petro Gazz Angels	Galeries Tower Highrisers	
Shar Ancheta	Zus Coffee Thunderbelles	Galeries Tower Highrisers	
Julia Angeles	Zus Coffee Thunderbelles	Galeries Tower Highrisers	
Gayle Pascual	Zus Coffee Thunderbelles	Galeries Tower Highrisers	
Dolly Versoza	Zus Coffee Thunderbelles	Galeries Tower Highrisers	
Joyme Cagande	Chery Tiggo EV Crossovers	Nxled Chameleons	
Aby Maraño	Chery Tiggo EV Crossovers	Nxled Chameleons	
Aduke Ogunsanya	Choco Mucho Flying Titans	Nxled Chameleons	
Antonette Adolfo	Petro Gazz Angels	Nxled Chameleons	
Djanel Cheng	Petro Gazz Angels	Nxled Chameleons	
Ranya Musa	Petro Gazz Angels	Nxled Chameleons	
Myla Pablo	Petro Gazz Angels	Nxled Chameleons	
MJ Phillips	Petro Gazz Angels	Nxled Chameleons	
Bang Pineda	Petro Gazz Angels	Nxled Chameleons	
Jonah Sabete	Petro Gazz Angels	Nxled Chameleons	
Jellie Tempiatura	Petro Gazz Angels	Nxled Chameleons	
Nicole Tiamzon	Petro Gazz Angels	Nxled Chameleons	
Jules Tolentino	Petro Gazz Angels	Nxled Chameleons	
Brooke Van Sickle	Petro Gazz Angels	Nxled Chameleons	
Seth Rodriguez	Chery Tiggo EV Crossovers	PLDT High Speed Hitters	
Renee Penafiel	Chery Tiggo EV Crossovers	Zus Coffee Thunderbelles	
Cess Robles	Chery Tiggo EV Crossovers	Zus Coffee Thunderbelles	
Karen Verdeflor	Chery Tiggo EV Crossovers	Zus Coffee Thunderbelles	
Rachel Daquis	Farm Fresh Foxies	Zus Coffee Thunderbelles	
Chie Saet	Petro Gazz Angels	Zus Coffee Thunderbelles	

=== Returnees ===
The following are previous players who weren't signed during the 2025 Reinforced Conference who are signed to a team in this conference.

Player	Last conference	Previous team	New team	Ref.
Eya Laure	2024 All-Filipino	Chery Tiggo Crossovers	Choco Mucho Flying Titans	
Venice Puzon	2023 Invitational (Note: Played for the PLDT High Speed Hitters with a Special Guest License (SGL).)	Lyceum Lady Pirates (NCAA)	Galeries Tower Highrisers	

=== Coaching changes ===
Team	Outgoing coach	Incoming coach	Ref.
Farm Fresh Foxies	(Italy) Alessandro Lodi	(Japan) Koji Tsuzurabara	
Galeries Tower Highrisers	(Kenya) Godfrey Okumu	(Philippines) Aying Esteban	

== Format ==
The format for the 2026 All-Filipino Conference will be a truncated version of the 2024–25 All-Filipino Conference format with key format changes in the qualifying round and play-in tournament.

Preliminary round

- The preliminary round will be a single round-robin tournament, with each team playing one match against all other teams for a total of nine matches.
- The top four teams will advance to the qualifying round while the bottom six will move on to the play-in tournament.

Qualifying round

- The qualifying round will feature play-in games.
- Only the top four teams from the preliminary round will compete in this round, rather than every team in the 2024–25 edition.
- The match-ups will be as follows:
  - QR1: #1 vs #4
  - QR2: #2 vs #3
- The winners will advance to the semifinals while the losers will move on to the play-in tournament.

Play-in tournament

- The play-in tournament will utilize a stepladder format instead of last season's round-robin.
- The bottom six teams from the prelims and the two losers from the qualifying round will be assigned to one of two stepladder brackets via the serpentine system.
- Teams may also earn a bye to a further round depending on their performance up to that point:
  - Qualifying round losers will start in the play-in finals.
  - Teams ranked fifth and sixth will start in the play-in semifinals.
  - Teams ranked seventh through tenth will start in the play-in quarterfinals.
- The match-ups will be as follows:

Pool A

- PQF-A: #8 vs. #9
- PSF-A: #5 vs. PQF-B winner
- PF-A: QR1 loser vs. PSF-A winner

Pool B

- PQF-B: #7 vs. #10
- PSF-B: #6 vs. PQF-A winner
- PF-B: QR2 loser vs. PSF-B winner

- The two play-in finals winners will join the two qualifying round winners in the semifinals.

Semifinals

- The semifinals will be a single-round robin.
- The two qualifying round winners and two teams from the play-in tournament will play three matches against each other.
- The top two teams will advance to the championship series.
- The bottom two teams will compete in the third place series.

Third place series

- The bottom two teams from the semifinals will compete in a best-of-three series to determine which team will finish third in this conference.
- If the series is tied at 1–1 when the championship is decided, the FIVB Ranking System will be used to determine the winner.

Finals

- The top two teams from the semifinals will compete in a best-of-three series to decide the championship for this conference. The losing team will be declared the runner-up.

Unused sweep scenario

- If a team had won all of their matches in the preliminary round, that team would have been granted an automatic berth to the semifinals. The format for the succeeding would have also been modified as follows:
  - Only the second-place and third-place teams would have advanced in the qualifying round. As such, there would only be one match during the round for the second semifinals berth.
  - The fourth-place team would have been sent straight to the play-in tournament, competing in Pool B.

== Pool standing procedure ==
Throughout the conference, teams will be ranked using the FIVB Ranking System as follows:

- First, teams are ranked by the number of matches won.
- If the number of matches won is tied, the tied teams are then ranked by match points, wherein:
  - Match won 3–0 or 3–1: 3 match points for the winner, 0 match points for the loser.
  - Match won 3–2: 2 match points for the winner, 1 match point for the loser.
- In case of any further ties, the following criteria shall be used:
  - Set ratio: the number of sets won divided by number of sets lost.
  - Point ratio: number of points scored divided by number of points allowed.
  - Head-to-head standings: any remaining tied teams are ranked based on the results of head-to-head matches involving the teams in question.

== Preliminary round ==
=== Standings ===
Pos	Team	Pld	W	L	Pts	SW	SL	SR	SPW	SPL	SPR	Qualification
1	PLDT High Speed Hitters	9	7	2	20	22	11	2.000	769	698	1.102	Qualifying round
2	Cignal Super Spikers	9	6	3	20	22	11	2.000	772	687	1.124	Qualifying round
3	Creamline Cool Smashers	9	6	3	16	20	16	1.250	700	662	1.057	Qualifying round
4	Farm Fresh Foxies	9	5	4	17	22	16	1.375	850	771	1.102	Qualifying round
5	Nxled Chameleons	9	5	4	15	20	16	1.250	810	773	1.048	Play-in tournament semifinals
6	Akari Chargers	9	5	4	15	19	18	1.056	792	838	0.945	Play-in tournament semifinals
7	Choco Mucho Flying Titans	9	4	5	13	19	19	1.000	828	826	1.002	Play-in tournament quarterfinals
8	Capital1 Solar Spikers	9	4	5	10	14	21	0.667	748	796	0.940	Play-in tournament quarterfinals
9	Galeries Tower Highrisers	9	2	7	6	11	24	0.458	707	800	0.884	Play-in tournament quarterfinals
10	Zus Coffee Thunderbelles	9	1	8	3	9	26	0.346	693	819	0.846	Play-in tournament quarterfinals

Source: Premier Volleyball League

=== Match results ===
- All times are Philippine Standard Time (UTC+08:00).

Date	Time	Venue		Score		Set 1	Set 2	Set 3	Set 4	Set 5	Total	Report
Jan. 31	16:00	FIL	Galeries Tower Highrisers	0–3	Cignal Super Spikers	17–25	14–25	11–25			42–75	P2
Jan. 31	18:30	FIL	Akari Chargers	0–3	Choco Mucho Flying Titans	17–25	23–25	20–25			60–75	P2
Feb. 03	16:00	FIL	Farm Fresh Foxies	2–3	Nxled Chameleons	23–25	25–13	25–21	15–25	12–15	100–99	P2
Feb. 03	18:30	FIL	Zus Coffee Thunderbelles	1–3	Capital1 Solar Spikers	17–25	16–25	25–15	19–25		77–90	P2
Feb. 05	16:00	FIL	Choco Mucho Flying Titans	1–3	Cignal Super Spikers	20–25	25–16	19–25	18–25		82–91	P2
Feb. 05	18:30	FIL	Creamline Cool Smashers	0–3	PLDT High Speed Hitters	22–25	17–25	23–25			62–75	P2
Feb. 07	16:00	YC2	Galeries Tower Highrisers	3–2	Zus Coffee Thunderbelles	25–20	25–22	23–25	22–25	15–10	110–102	P2
Feb. 07	18:30	YC2	Capital1 Solar Spikers	0–3	Nxled Chameleons	18–25	26–28	18–25			62–78	P2
Feb. 10	16:00	MOA	Farm Fresh Foxies	1–3	Cignal Super Spikers	17–25	24–26	25–20	28–30		94–101	P2
Feb. 10	18:30	MOA	Creamline Cool Smashers	3–1	Choco Mucho Flying Titans	27–25	17–25	25–21	25–15		94–86	P2
Feb. 12	16:00	FIL	PLDT High Speed Hitters	3–1	Capital1 Solar Spikers	25–20	25–16	22–25	25–17		97–78	P2
Feb. 12	18:30	FIL	Zus Coffee Thunderbelles	3–2	Akari Chargers	16–25	25–18	18–25	25–23	15–12	99–103	P2
Feb. 14	16:00	YCA	Galeries Tower Highrisers	0–3	Farm Fresh Foxies	14–25	15–25	12–25			41–75	P2
Feb. 14	18:30	YCA	Cignal Super Spikers	0–3	Nxled Chameleons	19–25	22–25	25–27			66–77	P2
Feb. 17	16:00	FIL	Choco Mucho Flying Titans	2–3	Capital1 Solar Spikers	21–25	25–18	18–25	25–19	10–15	99–102	P2
Feb. 17	18:30	FIL	Creamline Cool Smashers	3–1	Zus Coffee Thunderbelles	22–25	25–17	25–16	25–18		97–76	P2
Feb. 19	16:00	FIL	Akari Chargers	1–3	PLDT High Speed Hitters	22–25	27–25	21–25	15–25		85–100	P2
Feb. 19	18:30	FIL	Nxled Chameleons	1–3	Galeries Tower Highrisers	19–25	25–17	20–25	21–25		85–92	P2
Feb. 21	16:00	FIL	Creamline Cool Smashers	3–0	Capital1 Solar Spikers	25–18	26–24	25–20			76–62	P2
Feb. 21	18:30	FIL	Zus Coffee Thunderbelles	0–3	Farm Fresh Foxies	14–25	18–25	18–25			50–75	P2
Feb. 24	16:00	FIL	Akari Chargers	3–1	Nxled Chameleons	25–18	25–23	23–25	25–22		98–88	P2
Feb. 24	18:30	FIL	Cignal Super Spikers	3–0	PLDT High Speed Hitters	25–21	25–19	25–23			75–63	P2
Feb. 26	16:00	FIL	Capital1 Solar Spikers	3–2	Farm Fresh Foxies	26–24	20–25	28–26	20–25	15–11	109–111	P2
Feb. 26	18:30	FIL	Choco Mucho Flying Titans	3–2	Galeries Tower Highrisers	26–24	20–25	22–25	25–13	15–12	108–99	P2
Feb. 28	16:00	FIL	Cignal Super Spikers	2–3	Akari Chargers	23–25	25–20	25–11	23–25	12–15	108–96	P2
Feb. 28	18:30	FIL	Zus Coffee Thunderbelles	0–3	PLDT High Speed Hitters	23–25	23–25	13–25			59–75	P2
Mar. 03	16:00	FIL	Choco Mucho Flying Titans	3–1	Nxled Chameleons	27–25	28–26	16–25	25–19		96–95	P2
Mar. 03	18:30	FIL	Creamline Cool Smashers	3–1	Galeries Tower Highrisers	25–14	17–25	25–18	25–23		92–80	P2
Mar. 05	16:00	FIL	Cignal Super Spikers	3–0	Zus Coffee Thunderbelles	25–18	25–23	25–22			75–63	P2
Mar. 05	18:30	FIL	PLDT High Speed Hitters	3–2	Farm Fresh Foxies	25–17	23–25	27–25	21–25	15–10	111–102	P2
Mar. 07	16:00	FIL	Nxled Chameleons	2–3	Creamline Cool Smashers	16–25	25–22	21–25	25–15	10–15	97–102	P2
Mar. 07	18:30	FIL	Akari Chargers	3–1	Capital1 Solar Spikers	17–25	25–22	25–20	25–17		92–84	P2
Mar. 10	16:00	FIL	PLDT High Speed Hitters	3–0	Galeries Tower Highrisers	25–18	25–22	25–17			75–57	P2
Mar. 10	18:30	FIL	Farm Fresh Foxies	3–2	Choco Mucho Flying Titans	21–25	25–22	16–25	25–18	15–9	102–99	P2
Mar. 12	16:00	FIL	Akari Chargers	3–1	Creamline Cool Smashers	25–21	26–24	17–25	25–21		93–91	P2
Mar. 12	18:30	FIL	Nxled Chameleons	3–1	Zus Coffee Thunderbelles	20–25	25–15	25–23	25–19		95–82	P2
Mar. 14	16:00	FIL	PLDT High Speed Hitters	3–1	Choco Mucho Flying Titans	23–25	25–21	25–19	25–19		98–84	P2
Mar. 14	18:30	FIL	Capital1 Solar Spikers	0–3	Cignal Super Spikers	22–25	21–25	20–25			63–75	P2
Mar. 17	16:00	SRSC	Galeries Tower Highrisers	1–3	Akari Chargers	23–25	23–25	25–14	24–26		95–90	P2
Mar. 17	18:30	SRSC	Farm Fresh Foxies	3–1	Creamline Cool Smashers	25–16	25–22	18–25	25–23		93–86	P2
Mar. 19	16:00	FIL	Nxled Chameleons	3–1	PLDT High Speed Hitters	21–25	25–23	25–13	25–14		96–75	P2
Mar. 19	18:30	FIL	Choco Mucho Flying Titans	3–1	Zus Coffee Thunderbelles	27–25	22–25	25–16	25–19		99–85	P2
Mar. 21	13:30	FIL	Capital1 Solar Spikers	3–1	Galeries Tower Highrisers	25–20	22–25	25–22	26–24		98–91	P2
Mar. 21	16:00	FIL	Farm Fresh Foxies	3–1	Akari Chargers	25–19	25–14	23–25	25–17		98–75	P2
Mar. 21	18:30	FIL	Cignal Super Spikers	2–3	Creamline Cool Smashers	19–25	20–25	25–15	28–26	14–16	106–107	P2

== Qualifying round ==
- All times are Philippine Standard Time (UTC+08:00).

Date	Time	Venue		Score		Set 1	Set 2	Set 3	Set 4	Set 5	Total	Report
Mar. 26	16:00	SAC	PLDT High Speed Hitters	3–1	Farm Fresh Foxies	18–25	25–23	25–15	25–22		93–85	P2
Mar. 26	18:30	SAC	Creamline Cool Smashers	2–3	Cignal Super Spikers	21–25	26–24	25–18	22–25	15–17	109–109	P2

== Play-in tournament ==
- All times are Philippine Standard Time (UTC+08:00).

=== Pool A ===
Play-in pool A Round 1
8	Capital1	0
9	Galeries Tower	3

Play-in pool A Round 2
5	Nxled	3
9	Galeries Tower	0

Play-in pool A Round 3
4	Farm Fresh	3
5	Nxled	0

Date	Time	Venue		Score		Set 1	Set 2	Set 3	Set 4	Set 5	Total	Report
Mar. 24	16:00	FIL	Galeries Tower Highrisers	3–0	Capital1 Solar Spikers	25–16	25–20	30–28			80–64	P2
Mar. 28	16:00	NAS	Nxled Chameleons	3–0	Galeries Tower Highrisers	25–23	25–18	25–23			75–64	P2
Apr. 7	16:00	FIL	Farm Fresh Foxies	3–0	Nxled Chameleons	25–17	25–20	25–19			75–56	P2

=== Pool B ===
Play-in pool B Round 1
7	Choco Mucho	3
10	Zus Coffee	2

Play-in pool B Round 2
6	Akari	3
7	Choco Mucho	2

Play-in pool B Round 3
3	Creamline	3
6	Akari	1

Date	Time	Venue		Score		Set 1	Set 2	Set 3	Set 4	Set 5	Total	Report
Mar. 24	18:30	FIL	Zus Coffee Thunderbelles	2–3	Choco Mucho Flying Titans	25–21	22–25	25–13	11–25	11–15	94–99	P2
Mar. 28	18:30	NAS	Akari Chargers	3–2	Choco Mucho Flying Titans	25–15	23–25	25–16	15–25	21–19	109–100	P2
Apr. 7	18:30	FIL	Creamline Cool Smashers	3–1	Akari Chargers	25–23	25–20	16–25	25–16		91–84	P2

== Semifinals ==
- All times are Philippine Standard Time (UTC+08:00).

=== Standings ===
Pos	Team	Pld	W	L	Pts	SW	SL	SR	SPW	SPL	SPR	Qualification
1	Cignal Super Spikers	3	2	1	6	6	5	1.200	248	207	1.198	Finals
2	Creamline Cool Smashers	3	2	1	5	7	6	1.167	270	289	0.934	Finals
3	PLDT High Speed Hitters	3	1	2	4	6	6	1.000	276	266	1.038	Third place series
4	Farm Fresh Foxies	3	1	2	3	5	7	0.714	245	278	0.881	Third place series

Source: Premier Volleyball League

=== Match results ===
Date	Time	Venue		Score		Set 1	Set 2	Set 3	Set 4	Set 5	Total	Report
Apr. 11	16:00	MOA	Farm Fresh Foxies	1–3	Cignal Super Spikers	25–23	14–25	11–25	12–25		62–98	P2
Apr. 11	18:30	MOA	PLDT High Speed Hitters	2–3	Creamline Cool Smashers	25–22	25–27	25–19	26–28	10–15	111–111	P2
Apr. 14	16:00	MOA	Farm Fresh Foxies	3–1	PLDT High Speed Hitters	25–23	18–25	25–19	25–23		93–90	P2
Apr. 14	18:30	MOA	Cignal Super Spikers	3–1	Creamline Cool Smashers	25–13	13–25	25–16	25–16		88–70	P2
Apr. 16	16:00	FIL	Creamline Cool Smashers	3–1	Farm Fresh Foxies	25–23	14–25	25–23	25–19		89–90	P2
Apr. 16	18:30	FIL	PLDT High Speed Hitters	3–0	Cignal Super Spikers	25–17	25–22	25–23			75–62	P2

== Third place series ==
PLDT wins series, 2–0

Date	Time	Venue		Score		Set 1	Set 2	Set 3	Set 4	Set 5	Total	Report
Apr. 21	16:00	SAC	Farm Fresh Foxies	2–3	PLDT High Speed Hitters	25–22	21–25	25–27	28–26	11–15	110–115	P2
Apr. 23	16:00	SAC	PLDT High Speed Hitters	3–2	Farm Fresh Foxies	25–14	21–25	25–21	21–25	15–5	107–90	P2

== Finals ==
Creamline wins series, 2–0

Date	Time	Venue		Score		Set 1	Set 2	Set 3	Set 4	Set 5	Total	Report
Apr. 21	18:30	SAC	Cignal Super Spikers	0–3	Creamline Cool Smashers	22–25	18–25	16–25			56–75	P2
Apr. 23	18:30	SAC	Creamline Cool Smashers	3–2	Cignal Super Spikers	25–23	22–25	25–16	16–25	15–11	103–100	P2

== Final standings ==
Rank	Team
1st place, gold medalist(s)	Creamline Cool Smashers
2nd place, silver medalist(s)	Cignal Super Spikers
3rd place, bronze medalist(s)	PLDT High Speed Hitters
4	Farm Fresh Foxies
5	Nxled Chameleons
6	Akari Chargers
7	Choco Mucho Flying Titans
8	Galeries Tower Highrisers
9	Capital1 Solar Spikers
10	Zus Coffee Thunderbelles

Qualified for the 2026 PVL Invitational Conference

- The second-place team, the Cignal Super Spikers, left the league during the off-season.

2026 PVL All-Filipino champions
Creamline Cool Smashers
Eleventh title

Team roster
Alyssa Valdez (c), Jia de Guzman, Kyle Negrito, Dij Rodriguez, Jeanette Panaga, Michele Gumabao, Ella de Jesus, Lorie Bernardo, Kyla Atienza, Denden Lazaro-Revilla, Bea de Leon, Rosemarie Vargas, Jema Galanza, Bernadeth Pons, Tots Carlos, Aleiah Torres, Dannica Celis, Michelle Gamit, Jennifer Nierva, Sheena Toring
Head coach
Sherwin Meneses

== Awards and medalists ==
Individual awards

Award		Player	Team	Ref.
Conference Most Valuable Player		Vanie Gandler	Cignal	
Finals Most Valuable Player		Bernadeth Pons	Creamline	
Rookie of the Conference		Bella Belen	Capital1	
All-Premier Team	Best Outside Spiker	Bella Belen	Capital1	
All-Premier Team	Best Outside Spiker	Brooke Van Sickle	Nxled	
All-Premier Team	Best Middle Blocker	Jeanette Panaga	Creamline	
All-Premier Team	Best Middle Blocker	Riza Nogales	Zus Coffee	
All-Premier Team	Best Opposite Spiker	Trisha Tubu	Farm Fresh	
All-Premier Team	Best Setter	Gel Cayuna	Cignal	
All-Premier Team	Best Libero	Kath Arado	PLDT	

=== Medalists ===
Gold	Silver	Bronze
Creamline Cool Smashers: Alyssa Valdez (c); Jia de Guzman; Kyle Negrito; Dij Rodriguez; Jeanette Panaga; Michele Gumabao; Ella de Jesus; Lorie Bernardo; Kyla Atienza (L); Denden Lazaro-Revilla (L); Bea de Leon; Rosemarie Vargas; Jema Galanza; Bernadeth Pons; Tots Carlos; Aleiah Torres; Dannica Celis; Michelle Gamit; Jennifer Nierva (L); Sheena Toring	Cignal Super Spikers: Dawn Macandili-Catindig (c) (L); Pearl An Denura; Roselyn Doria; Jewel Encarnacion; Tin Tiamzon; Vanessa Gandler; Ishie Lalongisip; Maria Jessa Ordiales; Erika Santos; Erin May Pangilinan; Jacqueline Acuña; Gyzelle Sy; Ethan Arce; Heather Guino-o; Ivy Jisel Perez; Gel Cayuna; Ria Janelle Beatriz Duremdes (L)	PLDT High Speed Hitters: Kath Arado (c) (L); Maria Nieza Viray (L); Shiela Mae Kiseo; Mika Reyes; Alleiah Jan Lina Malaluan; Savi Davison; Zenneth Irene Perolino; Kim Fajardo; Majoy Baron; Kim Kianna Dy; Dell Palomata; Kiesha Dazzie Bedonia; Angelica Legacion; Angelica Alcantara; Seth Rodriguez; Jessey Laine de Leon; Jovie Prado
Head coach: Sherwin Meneses	Head coach: Shaq Delos Santos	Head coach: Rald Ricafort

== PVLPC Player of the Week ==
Week	Player	Team	Ref.
January 31–February 7	Savi Davison	PLDT High Speed Hitters	
February 10–14	Jules Tolentino	Nxled Chameleons	
February 17–21	Roselle Baliton	Galeries Tower Highrisers	
February 24–28	Ivy Lacsina	Akari Chargers	
March 3–7	Tots Carlos	Creamline Cool Smashers	
March 10–14	Ivy Lacsina	Akari Chargers	
March 17–21	Alyssa Valdez	Creamline Cool Smashers	
March 24–28	Gel Cayuna	Cignal Super Spikers	
April 7–11	Bernadeth Pons	Creamline Cool Smashers	
April 14–16	Vanie Gandler	Cignal Super Spikers	

== See also ==
- 2026 Spikers' Turf Open Conference
