= 2026 Choco Mucho Flying Titans season =

The 2026 Choco Mucho Flying Titans season may refer to:

- 2025–26 Choco Mucho Flying Titans season
- 2026–27 Choco Mucho Flying Titans season
