= Trisha Genesis =

Filipino volleyball player

Personal information
- Full name: Trisha Genesis
- Nationality: Filipino
- Born: March 20, 2000 (age 26)
- Home town: Sta. Rosa, Laguna
- Education: Adamson University (2018–2022)
- Height: 1.70 m (5 ft 7 in)
- Weight: 55 kg (121 lb)

Volleyball information
- Position: Outside hitter
- Number: 6

Trisha Genesis (born March 20, 2000) is a Filipino volleyball player who last played as an outside hitter for the Capital1 Solar Spikers of the Premier Volleyball League, the 2019 Collegiate Conference champion of which was her alma mater Adamson University and with her winning the MVP honors.

== Early life and education ==
Genesis played for Holy Rosary College of Santa Rosa, Laguna in 2012. After four years, she made it to the Philippine women's junior team which participated in the 2016 Asian Women's U19 Volleyball Championship.

A Palarong Pambansa skipper, Genesis was recruited by UAAP teams but chose to play for the Adamson Lady Falcons in 2018.

== Career ==
=== College ===
Genesis would play for the Adamson Lady Falcons in the University Athletic Association of the Philippines (UAAP) volleyball championships. She played alongside Louie Romero.

=== Club ===
Genesis has played in the Premier Volleyball League Collegiate Conference for Adamson which won the crown over the UST Tigresses via sweep in 2019. She was hailed the Conference MVP and 1st Best Open Spiker.

In 2022, Genesis signed with the Akari Chargers in the PVL to turn professional, leaving Adamson University after four years.

Honored as Best Player of the Game, Genesis scored 13 points (10 attacks and 3 aces) as she powered Akari to its first win over F2 Logistics in the PVL All-Filipino Conference last October 17, 2023.

After showcasing her talents with the Chargers and Nxled Chameleons, Genesis signed with the Capital1 Solar Spikers on January 17, 2025 to play a bigger role under coach Roger Gorayeb.

== Clubs ==
- (Philippines) Akari Chargers (2022–2024)
- (Philippines) Capital1 Solar Spikers (2025–present)

== Awards ==
=== Individual ===
- 2019 Premier Volleyball League Collegiate Conference – "Conference Most Valuable Player"
- 2019 Premier Volleyball League Collegiate Conference – "1st Best Outside Hitter"

=== Collegiate team ===
- 2019 Premier Volleyball League Collegiate Conference − Gold medal, with Adamson Lady Falcons
