= Iris Tolenada =

Filipino volleyball player

Personal information
- Full name: Iris Janelle Tolenada
- Born: August 25, 1991 (age 35)
- Hometown: Philippines
- Height: 1.75 m (5 ft 9 in)
- Weight: 55 kg (121 lb)
- Education: San Francisco State University

Volleyball information
- Position: Setter
- Current club: (Philippines) Farm Fresh Foxies
- Number: 23

Career
Years	Teams
2015	Philips Gold Lady Slammers
2016	Pocari Sweat Lady Warriors
2019	Motolite Power Builders
2019	Choco Mucho - Philippines
2022–2023	F2 Logistics Cargo Movers
2023–2024	GS Caltex Seoul Kixx
2024–2026	Capital1 Solar Spikers
2026–	Farm Fresh Foxies

National team
2019	Philippines
- Last updated: April 2025

Iris Janelle Tolenada (born August 25, 1991) is a Filipino professional volleyball player who plays as a setter for Premier Volleyball League club Farm Fresh Foxies. She was a member of the San Francisco State Gators in the NCAA Division II.

== Clubs ==
- (Philippines) Philips Gold Lady Slammers (2015)
- (Philippines) Pocari Sweat Lady Warriors (2016)
- (Philippines) Motolite Power Builders (2019)
- Choco Mucho - Philippines (2019)
- (Philippines) F2 Logistics Cargo Movers (2022–2023)
- (South Korea) GS Caltex Seoul Kixx (2023–2024)
- (Philippines) Capital1 Solar Spikers (2024–2026)
- (Philippines) Farm Fresh Foxies (2026–present)

== Awards ==
=== Individual ===
- 2015 PSL All-Filipino Conference "Best Setter"
- 2016 Shakey's V-League 13th Season Reinforced Conference "Best Setter"
- 2021 PNVF Champions League for Women "Best Setter"

=== Clubs ===
- 2015 PSL All-Filipino Conference – third place, with Philips Gold Lady Slammers
- 2016 Shakey's V-League 13th Season Reinforced Conference – Champions, with Pocari Sweat Lady Warriors
- 2021 PNVF Champions League for Women - Champions, with F2 Logistics Cargo Movers
- 2023 Premier Volleyball League All-Filipino Conference – third place, with F2 Logistics Cargo Movers

=== Recognitions ===
- 2013 San Francisco State University Female Athlete of the Year

Awards
Preceded by Julia Melissa Morado	Best Setter of Shakey's V-League / Premier Volleyball League; 2016 Reinforced	Succeeded by Jasmine Nabor
