= Vanie Gandler =

Filipino volleyball player (born 2000)

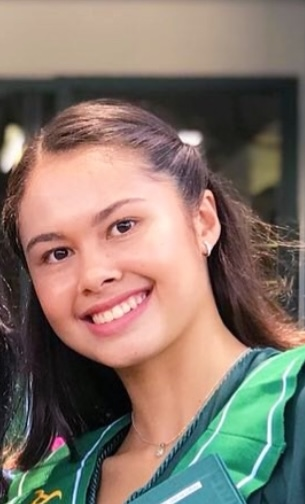
- Gandler in 2018

Personal information
- Full name: Vanessa Gandler
- Nickname: Vanie
- Nationality: Filipino
- Born: December 5, 2000 (age 25) Parañaque, Philippines
- Home town: Muntinlupa
- Education: Ateneo de Manila University
- Height: 1.75 m (5 ft 9 in)
- Weight: 60 kg (132 lb)
- Spike: 290 cm (114 in)
- Block: 278 cm (109 in)

Volleyball information
- Position: Outside hitter
- Current club: Capital1 Solar Spikers

Career
- Years: Team
- 2023–2026: Cignal HD Spikers
- 2026–present: Capital1 Solar Spikers

National team
- Years: Team
- 2024–present: Philippines
Honours
Women's volleyball
Representing Philippines
Asian Nations Cup
Silver medal – second place	2025 Hanoi	Team
Bronze medal – third place	2024 Manila	Team
SEA V.League
Bronze medal – third place	2024 Vĩnh Phúc	Leg 1
Bronze medal – third place	2024 Nakhon Ratchasima	Leg 2

Vanessa "Vanie" Gandler (born December 5, 2000) is a Filipino professional volleyball player who is an outside hitter for the Capital1 Solar Spikers of the Premier Volleyball League (PVL).

== Early life and education ==
Gandler originates from Muntinlupa. She attended high school at De La Salle Santiago Zobel School and played in its varsity volleyball team. She graduated from the Ateneo de Manila University in 2023 with a degree in business management.

== Career ==
=== College ===
Gandler played for the Blue Eagles of the Ateneo de Manila University in the University Athletic Association of the Philippines (UAAP). She had a rough debut in Season 81, scoring just a point in her debut game against De La Salle on February 17, 2019. While Ateneo won that season, Gandler recalls how she received backlash on social media for her performance.

The abrupt cancellation of Season 82 due to the COVID-19 pandemic allowed Gandler to reflect on her volleyball career and decided to improve her mental fitness. When the women's senior volleyball tournament returned in Season 84, Gandler improved in her offense leading Ateneo to a third place finish.

She ended her stint with Ateneo in Season 85.

=== Club ===
After the conclusion of UAAP Season 85 in 2023, Gandler made herself available to get signed by a club in the Premier Volleyball League. She was signed by the Cignal HD Spikers. In 2026, on her third year with Cignal, Gandler was named Most Valuable Player for the 2026 All-Filipino Conference

On May 14, 2026, Gandler signed with the Capital1 Solar Spikers, two weeks after Cignal took a leave of absence.

== Clubs ==
- (Philippines) Ateneo-Motolite (2018)
- (Philippines) Cignal HD Spikers (2023–2026)
- (Philippines) Capital1 Solar Spikers (2026–present)

== Awards ==
=== Individual ===
Year	League	Season/Conference	Award	Ref
2022	V-League	Collegiate	2nd Best Outside Hitter	
2026	PVL	All-Filipino	Most Valuable Player	

=== Collegiate ===
==== Ateneo Blue Eagles ====
Year	League	Season/Conference	Title	Ref
2019	UAAP	81	Champions	
2019	PVL	Collegiate	3rd Place	
2022	UAAP	84	3rd Place	
2022	V-League	Collegiate	Champions	

=== Clubs ===
Year	League	Season/Conference	Club	Title	Ref
2018	PVL	Open	Ateneo-Motolite	Runner-up	
2023	PVL	Invitational	Cignal HD Spikers	3rd place	
2023	PVL	2nd All-Filipino	Cignal HD Spikers	3rd place	
2024	PNVF	Champions League	Cignal HD Spikers	Runner-up	
2024	PVL	Reinforced	Cignal HD Spikers	3rd place	
2024	PVL	Invitational	Cignal HD Spikers	Runner-up	
2026	PVL	All-Filipino	Cignal HD Spikers	Runner-up	
