= Roger Gorayeb =

Filipino volleyball coach (born 1960)

Personal information
- Nationality: Filipino
- Born: Rogelio Gorayeb; 1959 or 1960 (age 66–67)

Coaching information
- Current team: San Sebastian Lady Stags
Previous teams coached
Years	Teams
2008–2013; 2013; 2014; 2015; 2015–2017; 2016–2017; 2018; 2021; 2023; 2024–2025	Ateneo de Manila (women's); Philippines (women's); PLDT (women's); Philippines (women's); National University (women's); BaliPure Purest Water Defenders; PayMaya High Flyers; PLDT Home Fibr Power Hitters; Senate Lady Defenders; Capital1 Solar Spikers

Roger Gorayeb is a Filipino volleyball coach and former college player who is the head coach of the San Sebastian Lady Stags of NCAA Philippines and a team consultant for the Capital1 Solar Spikers of the Premier Volleyball League (PVL).

Gorayeb has been the head coach of San Sebastian since the 1980s and has helped lead San Sebastian to numerous volleyball titles.

== Career ==
Gorayeb has served as head coach of the San Sebastian College women's volleyball team. Under Gorayeb's watch, San Sebastian grabbed 11 consecutive championships for the women's team from 1986 to 1997, 22 women's volleyball titles, 6 titles in women's beach volleyball and 11 in junior's volleyball. Gorayeb started his coaching career as a player-coach in 1984, when he was tasked to lead San Sebastian's men's team when their Australian coach left the team. He was also involved in a brawl with several players of San Beda Red Lions basketball team and its coach Frankie Lim during a volleyball game in 2011 held at the San Beda Gym.

He was also the head coach of the Ateneo Lady Eagles volleyball team for five years until his resignation in 2013 as head coach to focus on his coaching stint with San Sebastian.

He previously served as head coach of the Philippine women's national team in 2013 for the 2014 FIVB Women's World Championship qualifiers and has also led the women's team of the PLDT Home Telpad Turbo Boosters at the Shakey's V-League in 2014.

From January 2015 to April 2017, he was the head coach of the NU Lady Bulldogs volleyball team.

Gorayeb and volleyball referee Rodrigo Rojas were given a one-game suspension by the NCAA on December 15, 2015, after they involved in a "shouting" and "shoving" incident during the game between the Gorayeb-coached San Sebastian Stags and the defending NCAA women's volleyball champions Arellano Chiefs last December 12.

Gorayeb's left PLDT Home Fibr after his contract expired by the end of 2021. This marks the end of Gorayeb's eight years stint of coaching PLDT-backed teams.

On August to October 2023, Gorayeb became the head coach of the Senate women's volleyball team, as part of the UNTV Volleyball League's inaugural season. Under his guidance, the Lady Defenders ended the elimination round with a 7–3 record, securing second place. In the semifinals, they won in 4 sets against PNP. In the Finals, Gorayeb and Senate bowed down to the undefeated AFP team in two games, both in 3 sets. Nonetheless, his team was able to donate P250,000 to their chosen charity Senate Spouses Foundation, Inc.

Gorayeb returned to the PVL in 2024, joining newly formed team, Capital1 Solar Spikers. On June 2, 2025, he was reassigned as team consultant following the team's hiring of Alas Pilipinas women's coach Jorge de Brito.

== Personal life ==
In 2019, Gorayeb was diagnosed with multiple myeloma. By June 2020, he was already cancer-free.
