= Jorge de Brito (volleyball) =

Brazilian volleyball player

Personal information
- Full name: Jorge Edson Souza de Brito
- Born: October 13, 1966 (age 60); Porto Alegre, Brazil
- Height: 1.92 m (6 ft 4 in)

Coaching information
Previous teams coached
Years	Teams
2021–2025; 2022–2023; 2025–	Philippines (women); Akari Chargers; Capital1 Solar Spikers

Volleyball information
- Position: Middle blocker
- Number: 2
Honours
Men's volleyball
Representing Brazil
Olympic Games
Gold medal – first place	1992 Barcelona	Team
Pan American Games
Silver medal – second place	1991 Havana	Team
CSV South American Championship
Gold medal – first place	1989 Curitiba
Women's volleyball
Head coach Philippines
Asian Women's Volleyball Challenge Cup
Bronze medal – third place	2024 Manila	Team
SEA V.League
Bronze medal – third place	2024 Vĩnh Phúc	Leg 1
Bronze medal – third place	2024 Nakhon Ratchasima	Leg 2

Jorge Edson Souza de Brito (born October 13, 1966), known as Jorge Edson, is a Brazilian volleyball coach and retired volleyball player who is the head coach for the Capital1 Solar Spikers of the Premier Volleyball League. He was a member of the Brazil men's national volleyball team that won the gold medal at the 1992 Summer Olympics in Barcelona by defeating the Netherlands (3-0) in the final. He played as a middle blocker. He was born in Porto Alegre.

== Coaching career ==
=== 2000–2021 ===
De Brito later became a coach. From 2002 onwards, De Brito led top-tier Brazilian clubs and clinched podium finishes for sides from Turkey and Japan. He was part of the coaching staff of the Incheon Korean Air Jumbos of the South Korean V-League from 2015 to 2016 and the Clube Duque de Caxais in 2021.

De Brito was a remote assistant coach of the Brazilian women's national team that won gold at the 2008 Summer Olympics in Beijing.

=== Philippines ===
De Brito joined the coaching staff of the Philippines women's national team in July 2021 under the FIVB's development project platform. He joined the Philippine national team as a consultant with Arthur Mamon remaining head coach of the team. When the national team was fielded as two club sides (Rebisco and Choco Mucho) in the 2021 Asian Women's Club Volleyball Championship, Edson was tasked to be the head coach of the Rebisco team, and Mamon was tasked to lead the Choco Mucho team.

De Brito would be appointed as head coach of new Premier Volleyball League club Akari Chargers in 2022. He would serve the role concurrently with his national team duties until his resignation in December 2023.

His contract with the Philippine national team is scheduled to expire on June 30, 2024 with his last tournament with the squad being the 2024 Asian Women's Volleyball Challenge Cup. He was able to lead the team to its best ever finish in the tournament – third place. This made the Philippine National Volleyball Federation (PNVF) initiate negotiations to extend his contract. The federation decide to retain him until the 2025 SEA Games in December. A later report, however states the contract is supposed to last until July 2026.

On June 2, 2025, De Brito was appointed as head coach of the Capital1 Solar Spikers, replacing Roger Gorayeb, who was reassigned as team consultant. De Brito remains concurrent national team coach.

The Philippine national team failed to medal in the women's volleyball tournament of the 2025 SEA Games in Thailand. De Brito enters the tournament having already been served a noticed in October that his contract will be prematurely terminated by the end of 2025. In 2026, De Brito filed a legal complaint against the PNVF over alleged unpaid wages and bonuses while the PNVF under president Tonyboy Liao claimed the coach violated his contract by taking a concurrent job with a club.

== Personal life ==
He is married to Raquele Lenartowicz, a former professional volleyball player, with whom he has three children. He is also Roman Catholic.
