= Shaya Adorador =

Filipino volleyball player

Personal information
- Full name: Maria Shaya Adorador
- Nationality: Filipino
- Born: December 29, 1997 (age 28)
- Home town: Quezon City, Philippines
- Education: University of the East
- Height: 173 cm (5 ft 8 in)
- Spike: 274 cm (108 in)
- Block: 269 cm (106 in)

Volleyball information
- Position: Outside Hitter
- Current team: Capital1 Solar Spikers

Career
- Years: Team
- 2018–2020: Foton Tornadoes
- 2020–2023: Chery Tiggo Crossovers
- 2023: Foton Tornadoes
- 2023–2025: Chery Tiggo Crossovers
- 2026–present: Capital1 Solar Spikers

Maria Shaya Adorador (born December 9, 1997) is a Filipina volleyball player who is an outside hitter for the Capital1 Solar Spikers of the Premier Volleyball League (PVL). She played for the UE Lady Warriors in the UAAP women's volleyball tournaments.

== Career ==
=== UAAP ===
Adorador played for the UE Lady Warriors in the UAAP. She made her first appearance with the Lady Warriors in the UAAP Season 76, where they finished 8th place. In 2018, she played her final year with the Lady Warriors.

=== PVL ===
Adorador made her first appearance with the Foton Tornadoes Blue Energy in the 2018 PSL Invitational Cup. In 2020, joined the 2020 PSL Grand Prix with their new name Chery Tiggo Crossovers. After a few games the league was cancelled due to the COVID-19 pandemic.

In 2021, her team transferred to Premier Volleyball League and they bagged their first Championship title in the PVL in the 2021 PVL Open Conference. In 2023, she joined the returned of Foton Tornadoes in the volleyball as the sister team of Chery Tiggo Crossovers alongside Jasmine Nabor, May Luna, Seth Rodriguez, Jaila Marie Atienza, France Ronquillo, and Bingle Landicho.

== Awards ==
=== Individual ===
| Year | League | Season/Conference | Award | Ref |
|---|---|---|---|---|
| 2019 | PSL | Invitational | 2nd Best Outside Spiker | |

=== Clubs ===
| Year | League | Season/Conference | Clubs | Title | Ref |
|---|---|---|---|---|---|
| 2021 | PVL | Open | Chery Tiggo Crossovers | Champion | |
| 2024 | PNVF | Champions League | Chery Tiggo Crossovers | 3rd Place | |
