= Capital1 Solar Spikers =

Filipino women's volleyball team

- 2026–27 Capital1 Solar Spikers season
- Short name: Capital1
- Nickname: Solar Spikers
- Founded: 2024
- History: Capital1 Solar Spikers; 2024–present
- Owner: CapitalOne Energy Corp.
- Head coach: Jorge de Brito
- Captain: Pauline Gaston
- League: Premier Volleyball League
- 2026 All-Filipino: 9th place

The Capital1 Solar Spikers are a Philippine women's professional volleyball team owned by CapitalOne Energy Corp. The team competes in the Premier Volleyball League (PVL), where they made their debut in the 2024 All-Filipino Conference.

As of the 2026 All-Filipino Conference, the Solar Spikers are the newest team in the league.

== History ==
Team logo from 2024 to 2025.

On January 20, 2024, it was reported that Mikee Romero, who also owned the Philippine Basketball Association's NorthPort Batang Pier, was given a new franchise in the Premier Volleyball League (PVL). The new franchise would fill in the slot that was vacated by the F2 Logistics Cargo Movers, who disbanded after the 2023 Second All-Filipino Conference. On January 21, the yet-to-be-announced expansion team appointed Roger Gorayeb as its inaugural head coach.

On January 25, the new franchise was formally awarded to Capital1 Solar Energy in a press conference, beating three other entities who were also in the big for F2 Logistics' slot. The team was originally going to be named the Capital1 Power Spikers. The team's ownership would be led by Mikee's daughters, Mandy and Milka.

The team made their debut on February 20 in the 2024 All-Filipino Conference, where they lost to the Chery Tiggo Crossovers in straight sets.

== Current roster ==
Capital1 Solar Spikers roster
| No. | Nat. | Player | Pos. | Height | DOB | From |
|---|---|---|---|---|---|---|
| 1 | (Philippines) | Khy Cepada | Outside Hitter | 1.73 m (5 ft 8 in) | July 31, 2003 (age 23) | UE |
| 2 | (Philippines) | Jasmine Nabor | Setter | 1.75 m (5 ft 9 in) | July 11, 1998 (age 28) | National-U |
| 3 | (Philippines) (Canada) | Rachel Jorvina | Libero | 1.64 m (5 ft 5 in) | April 19, 1998 (age 28) | MacEwan |
| 4 | (Philippines) | Bella Belen | Outside Hitter | 1.72 m (5 ft 8 in) | June 29, 2002 (age 24) | National-U |
| 5 | (Philippines) | Vanie Gandler | Outside Hitter | 1.75 m (5 ft 9 in) | December 5, 2000 (age 25) | Ateneo |
| 6 | (Philippines) | Trisha Genesis | Outside Hitter | 1.70 m (5 ft 7 in) | March 20, 2000 (age 26) | Adamson |
| 8 | (Philippines) | Ezra Madrigal | Middle Blocker | 1.81 m (5 ft 11 in) | December 8, 1999 (age 26) | Far Eastern |
| 9 | (Philippines) | Pauline Gaston (C) | Opposite Hitter | 1.79 m (5 ft 10 in) | August 27, 1997 (age 29) | Ateneo |
| 11 | (Philippines) | Pia Abbu | Middle Blocker | 1.72 m (5 ft 8 in) | August 14, 2002 (age 24) | UST |
| 12 | (Philippines) | Kecelyn Galdones | Middle Blocker | 1.75 m (5 ft 9 in) | July 29, 1999 (age 27) | UST |
| 13 | (Philippines) | France Ronquillo | Outside Hitter | 1.72 m (5 ft 8 in) | September 15, 1999 (age 27) | National-U |
| 14 | (Philippines) | Detdet Pepito | Libero | 1.57 m (5 ft 2 in) | October 27, 2002 (age 23) | UST |
| 15 | (Philippines) | Ypril Tapia | Outside Hitter | 1.62 m (5 ft 4 in) | December 17, 2001 (age 24) | UST |
| 16 | (Philippines) | Sydney Niegos | Opposite Hitter | 1.72 m (5 ft 8 in) | September 26, 2000 (age 26) | José Rizal |
| 18 | (Philippines) | Janel Maraguinot | Setter | 1.60 m (5 ft 3 in) | July 18, 2000 (age 26) | Ateneo |
| 19 | (Philippines) | Roma Doromal | Libero | 1.70 m (5 ft 7 in) | July 19, 2000 (age 26) | Ateneo |
| 21 | (Philippines) | Ysa Jimenez | Outside Hitter | 1.75 m (5 ft 9 in) | November 8, 1999 (age 26) | UST |
| 23 | (Philippines) | Shaya Adorador | Outside Hitter | 1.72 m (5 ft 8 in) | December 9, 1997 (age 28) | UE |
| 24 | (Philippines) | Cherry Nunag | Middle Blocker | 1.80 m (5 ft 11 in) | October 22, 1992 (age 33) | De La Salle–Dasmariñas |
| 25 | (Philippines) | Erika Santos | Opposite Hitter | 1.76 m (5 ft 9 in) | May 13, 1998 (age 28) | De La Salle |
| – | (Philippines) | Julia Coronel | Setter | 1.71 m (5 ft 7 in) | October 5, 2001 (age 25) | De La Salle |
| – | (Philippines) | Mayang Nuique | Opposite Hitter | 1.73 m (5 ft 8 in) | July 20, 2002 (age 24) | Adamson |
Updated as of: September 30, 2026 | Source: PVL.ph

Coaching staff

- Head coach:
  Jorge de Brito
- Assistant coaches:
  Ed Ortega
  Jerome Guhit
  Raquel Lenartowicz
- Statistician:
  Joyce Antonniette Palad
- Strength & conditioning coach:
  Justin Aquino

Team staff

- Team managers:
  Hollie Reyes
  Arvie Dizon
- Team coordinator:
  Rosary Pena

Medical staff

- Physiotherapist:
  Hannah De Luna
  Ivan Bryan Bautista

== Season-by-season records ==
| Season | Conference | Preliminary round | Final round | Ranking | Source |
| 2024–25 (team) | All-Filipino | 11th (1–10, 4 pts) | Did not qualify | 11th place | |
| 2024–25 (team) | Reinforced | 7th (5–3, 13 pts) | Lost in quarterfinals vs. Cignal, 1–3 | 7th place | |
| 2024–25 (team) | Invitational | Did not qualify | | | |
| 2024–25 (team) | All-Filipino | 11th (1–10, 5 pts) | Did not qualify | 11th place | |
| 2025–26 (team) | PVL on Tour | 6th (0–5, 1 pt) (Pool B) | Did not qualify | 11th place | |
| 2025–26 (team) | Invitational | Did not qualify | | | |
| 2025–26 (team) | Reinforced | 7th (4–4, 13 pts) | Lost in quarterfinals vs. Zus Coffee, 0–3 | 8th place | |
| 2025–26 (team) | All-Filipino | 8th (4–5, 10 pts) | Lost in Play-in quarterfinal (Pool A) vs. Galeries Tower, 0–3 | 9th place | |
| 2026–27 (team) | Invitational | Did not qualify | | | |

== Individual awards ==
2nd Best Middle Blocker

- Des Clemente – 2024 Reinforced

1st Best Outside Spiker

- Bella Belen – 2026 All-Filipino

Rookie of the Conference

- Bella Belen – 2026 All-Filipino

== Team captains ==
- (Philippines) Jorelle Singh (2024–2025)
- (Philippines) Roma Mae Doromal (2025–2026)
- (Philippines) Pauline Gaston (2026–present)

== Former players ==
- Aiko Urdas
- Arianne Layug
- Ayumi Furukawa
- Bingle Landincho
- Cathrina Dizon
- Giliana Torres
- Heather Anne Guino-o
- Iris Tolenada
- Ivy Aquino
- Jannine Navarro
- Janeca Lana
- Jerrili Malabanan
- Jhudielle Quizon
- Jorelle Singh (2023-2026)
- Julia Ipac
- Katherine Villegas
- Leila Cruz (2024-2026)
- Lourdes Clemente-De Guzman
- May Macatuno
- Nikka Yandoc
- Patty Jane Orendain
- Rachel Austero
- Renesa Melgar
- Rica Rivera-Pancho
- Rovena Instrella
- Shola Alvarez
- Shyra Umandal

== Draft history ==
| Season | Pick No. | Name |
|---|---|---|
| 2024 | 2 | Leila Cruz |
| 2024 | 14 | Roma Mae Doromal |
| 2024 | 20 | Giliana Torres |
| 2025 | 1 | Bella Belen |
| 2025 | 14 | Pia Abbu |
| 2025 | 24 | Ivy Aquino |
| 2026 | 2 | Detdet Pepito |
| 2026 | 9 | KC Cepada |

== Head coach ==
- (Philippines) Roger Gorayeb (2024–2025)
- (Brazil) Jorge Souza de Brito (2025–present)

== Imports ==
- (Russia) Marina Tushova (2024)
- (Ukraine) Oleksandra Bytsenko (2025)

== See also ==
- Capital1 Solar Strikers
