= Cherry Nunag =

Filipino volleyball player

Personal information
- Nationality: Filipino
- Born: October 22, 1992 (age 34); Floridablanca, Pampanga, Philippines
- Height: 180 cm (5 ft 11 in)
- Education: De La Salle University – Dasmariñas

Volleyball information
- Position: Middle blocker
- Current club: Choco Mucho Flying Titans

Career
Years	Teams
2016–2018	F2 Logistics Cargo Movers
2018–2020	Petro Gazz Angels
2020–2021	Perlas Spikers
2021–2025	Choco Mucho Flying Titans
2026–present	Capital1 Solar Spikers

National team
2023–2024	Philippines

Cherry Rose Nunag (born October 22, 1992) is a Filipino professional volleyball player for the Capital1 Solar Spikers of the Premier Volleyball League.

== Early life ==
Cherry Rose Nunag was born on October 22, 1992 in Floridablanca, Pampanga. She took up volleyball in high school.

== Career ==
=== Collegiate ===
Unlike typical top volleyball players in the Philippines, Nunag did not play in either the University Athletic Association of the Philippines or the National Collegiate Athletic Association. Instead she was a player for the team of De La Salle University – Dasmariñas.

She started playing in the V-League in 2013 as part of the De La Salle Lady Patriots.

=== Club ===
The now-defunct Philippine Super Liga had Nunag at its player. She joined the PSL in 2015, playing for Petron and the F2 Logistics Cargo Movers.

She later moved to the Premier Volleyball League (PVL) and became part of Petro Gazz Angels and Perlas Spikers. She joined the Choco Mucho Flying Titans in November 2021 ahead of the PVL's 2022 season. On December 29, 2025, Nunag was released from the Flying Titans as part of the team's rebuild.

=== National team ===
Nunag became part of the Philippines women's national team which took part at the 2024 AVC Women's Challenge Cup and the 2024 FIVB Women's Volleyball Challenger Cup.
