= Pauline Gaston =

Filipino volleyball player

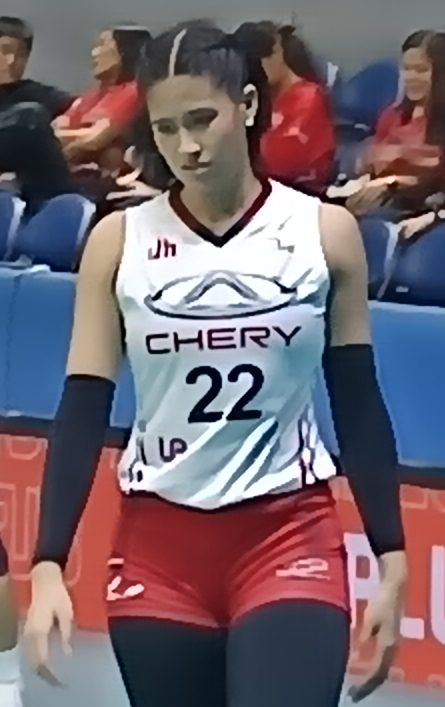
- Gaston in 2025

Personal information
- Full name: Pauline Marie Monique Mandanas Gaston
- Nickname: Ponggay
- Nationality: Filipino
- Born: August 27, 1997 (age 29)
- Home town: Iloilo City, Iloilo, Philippines
- Education: Ateneo De Manila University
- Height: 1.73 m (5 ft 8 in)
- Weight: 67 kg (148 lb)
- Spike: 278 cm (109 in)
- Block: 273 cm (107 in)

Volleyball information
- Position: Outside Hitter; Opposite Hitter; Middle Blocker
- Current club: Capital1 Solar Spikers

Career
- Years: Team
- 2018: Ateneo–Motolite
- 2020–2022: Choco Mucho Flying Titans
- 2023–2025: Chery Tiggo Crossovers
- 2026–: Capital1 Solar Spikers

National team
- Years: Team
- 2016: Philippines
Honours
Women's volleyball
ASEAN University Games
Bronze medal – third place	2016 Singapore	Team

Pauline Marie Monique Mandanas Gaston (born August 27, 1997) is a Filipino professional volleyball player who serves as team captain for the Capital1 Solar Spikers of the Premier Volleyball League. She played with Ateneo Lady Eagles collegiate women's University team.

== Career ==
Ponggay Gaston played for the Ateneo De Manila University collegiate women's University team alongside her sister Therese Gaston. She also represented the Ateneo in the UAAP beach volleyball championships in 2019.

In 2020, she became the captain of the Ateneo Lady Eagles in the UAAP Season 84 volleyball tournaments but the tournament was cut due to the COVID-19 pandemic.

In August 2020, Gaston was signed by the Choco Mucho Flying Titans.

In 2023, she was signed by the Chery Tiggo Crossovers.

== Personal life ==
Ponggay Gaston is the daughter of former PBA player Matthew "Fritz" Gaston and former beauty queen Duday Mandanas-Gaston. She attended high school at the University of Santo Tomas. She studied interdisciplinary studies at the Ateneo De Manila University.

== Filmography ==
=== Television ===
Year	Title	Network	Role	Notes
2022	The Score	One Sports	Co-Host	

== Awards ==
=== Individual ===
Year	League	Season/Conference	Award	Ref
2014	UAAP	76 (junior's)	Best Blocker	
2015	UAAP	77 (junior's)	Best Blocker	

=== Collegiate ===
Year	League	Season/Conference	Title	Ref
2015	Shakey's VL	Collegiate	Runner-up	
2016	UAAP	78	Runner-up	
2016	Shakey's VL	Collegiate	Runner-up	
2017	UAAP	79	Runner-up	
2018	UAAP	80	3rd Place	
2019	UAAP	81	Champions	
2019	PVL	Collegiate	3rd Place	

=== Clubs ===
Year	League	Conference	Club	Title	Ref
2018	PVL	Open	Ateneo-Motolite	Runner-up	
2024	PNVF	Champions League	Chery Tiggo Crossovers	3rd Place	
2025	PVL	on Tour	Chery Tiggo Crossovers	Runner-up	
