= Jasmine Nabor =

Filipino volleyball player

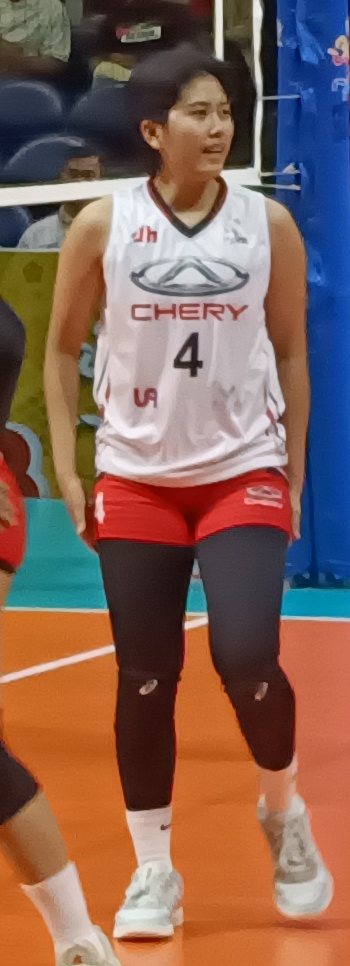
- Nabor in 2025

Personal information
- Full name: Jasmine Nabor
- Nickname: Jas
- Nationality: Filipino
- Born: July 11, 1998 (age 28)
- Home town: Tarlac, Philippines
- Education: National University
- Height: 1.75 m (5 ft 9 in)
- Weight: 74 kg (163 lb)
- Spike: 305 cm (120 in)
- Block: 299 cm (118 in)

Volleyball information
- Position: Setter
- Current club: Capital1 Solar Spikers

Career
- Years: Team
- 2015–2018: NU Lady Bulldogs
- 2017: BaliPure Purest Water Defenders
- 2018: PayMaya High Flyers
- 2018–2019: PLDT Home Fibr Hitters
- 2020–2023: Chery Tiggo Crossovers
- 2023: Foton Tornadoes
- 2024–2025: Chery Tiggo Crossovers
- 2026–present: Capital1 Solar Spikers

National team
- Years: Team
- 2016 (U-19), 2019 (senior): Philippines
Honours
Women's volleyball
Representing Philippines
ASEAN Grand Prix
| Bronze medal – third place | 2019 Santa Rosa | Leg 2 |

Jasmine Nabor (born July 11, 1998) is a Filipino professional volleyball player for the Capital1 Solar Spikers of the Premier Volleyball League (PVL). She is also a member of the Philippines women's national volleyball team.

== Clubs ==
- (Philippines) BaliPure Purest Water Defenders (2017)
- (Philippines) PayMaya High Flyers (2018)
- (Philippines) PLDT Home Fibr Hitters (2018–2019)
- (Philippines) Chery Tiggo Crossovers (2020–2023, 2024–2025)
- (Philippines) Foton Tornadoes (2023)
- (Philippines) Capital1 Solar Spikers (2026–present)

== Awards ==
=== Individual ===
Premier Volleyball League

- Finals Most Valuable Player – 2017 Collegiate
- Best Setter – 2017 Reinforced

Shakey's V-League

- Finals Most Valuable Player – 2016 Collegiate

UAAP women's beach volleyball

- Rookie of the Year – 2015 (Season 78)

=== Collegiate ===
- 2016 Shakey's V-League 13th Season Collegiate Conference – Champions, with NU Lady Bulldogs
- 2017 Premier Volleyball League 1st Season Collegiate Conference – Champions, with NU Lady Bulldogs
- 2018 UAAP Season 80 – Bronze medal, with NU Lady Bulldogs

=== Club ===
- 2017 Premier Volleyball League 1st Season Reinforced Open Conference – Silver medal, with BaliPure Purest Water Defenders
- 2017 Premier Volleyball League 1st Season Open Conference – Champions, with BaliPure Purest Water Defenders
- 2018 Premier Volleyball League Reinforced Conference – Silver medal, with PayMaya High Flyers
- 2019 Philippine Super Liga Grand Prix Conference – Bronze medal, with PLDT Home Fibr Hitters
- 2021 Premier Volleyball League Open Conference – Champions, with Chery Tiggo Crossovers
