= Anngela Nunag =

Filipina volleyball athlete

Personal information
- Nationality: Filipino
- Born: December 21, 1991 (age 34)
- Height: 5 ft 3 in (1.60 m)
- Education: Rizal Technological University

Volleyball information
- Position: Libero

Career
| Years | Teams |
|---|---|
| 2011–2016 | Philippine Army Lady Troopers |
| 2017 | Creamline Cool Smashers |
| 2018–2020 | Philippine Army Lady Troopers |
| 2020 | Petron Blaze Spikers |
| 2021–2023 | Philippine Army Lady Troopers |
| 2023–2024 | Cignal HD Spikers |
| 2024–2025 | Chery Tiggo Crossovers |

Anngela Nunag (born December 21, 1991) is a Filipino volleyball athlete. She last played for the Chery Tiggo Crossovers in the Premier Volleyball League.

== Volleyball career ==
Nunag plays as the Libero of the Philippine Army Lady Troopers in 2012 up to 2016.

In 2017, she played for the Creamline Cool Smashers and her team became Bronze medalist in the 2017 PVL Open Conference.

In 2018, she transferred back to Philippine Army and she won best Libero in 2019.

In 2020, she played for the Petron Blaze Spikers in the PSL but the tournament was cancelled because of the COVID-19 pandemic.

In 2021, she played again for the Philippine Army. In 2023, she became the captain of her team in the 2023 PVL All-Filipino Conference.

== Clubs ==
- (Philippines) Philippine Army Lady Troopers (2011–2016, 2018–2020, 2021–2023)
- (Philippines) Creamline Cool Smashers (2017)
- (Philippines) Petron Blaze Spikers (2020)
- (Philippines) Cignal HD Spikers (2023–2024)
- (Philippines) Chery Tiggo Crossovers (2024–2025)

== Awards ==
=== Individual ===
| Year | League | Conference | Award | Ref |
|---|---|---|---|---|
| 2012 | SVL | Open | Best Spiker | |
| 2019 | PVL | Reinforced | Best Libero | |

=== Clubs ===
| Year | League | Conference | Club | Title | Ref |
|---|---|---|---|---|---|
| 2011 | SVL | Open | Philippine Army Lady Troopers | Champions | |
| 2011 | SVL | SEA Club Invitational | Philippine Army Lady Troopers | Runner-up | |
| 2012 | SVL | Open | Philippine Army Lady Troopers | 3rd Place | |
| 2013 | PSL | Invitational | TMS-Army Lady Troopers | Champions | |
| 2013 | PSL | Grand Prix | TMS-Army Lady Troopers | Champions | |
| 2013 | SVL | Open | Philippine Army Lady Troopers | Champions | |
| 2014 | PSL | All-Filipino | Generika-Army Lady Troopers | Runner-up | |
| 2014 | SVL | Open | Philippine Army Lady Troopers | Champions | |
| 2014 | SVL | Reinforced | Philippine Army Lady Troopers | Champions | |
| 2015 | SVL | Open | Philippine Army Lady Troopers | Runner-up | |
| 2015 | SVL | Reinforced | Philippine Army Lady Troopers | Runner-up | |
| 2016 | PSL | Invitational | RC Cola-Army Troopers | Champions | |
| 2016 | PSL | All-Filipino | RC Cola-Army Troopers | 3rd Place | |
| 2019 | PVL | Reinforced | PacificTown-Army Lady Troopers | 3rd Place | |
| 2023 | PVL | Invitational | Cignal HD Spikers | 3rd Place | |
| 2023 | PVL | Second All-Filipino | Cignal HD Spikers | 3rd Place | |
