= Royse Tubino =

Filipina volleyball player (born 1993)

Honey Royse Tubino

Personal information
- Nickname: Royse
- Nationality: Filipino
- Born: January 12, 1993 (age 33)
- Height: 1.77 m (5 ft 10 in)
- Education: University of Perpetual Help System Dalta

Volleyball information
- Position: Outside hitter
- Current club: Farm Fresh Foxies

Career
| Years | Teams |
|---|---|
| 2012 | Cagayan Valley Lady Rising Suns |
| 2013–2014 | Cignal HD Spikers |
| 2015–2016 | Philippine Army Lady Troopers |
| 2017 | Cignal HD Spikers |
| 2018 | Cocolife Asset Managers |
| 2019–2020 | Sta. Lucia Lady Realtors |
| 2021–2023 | Philippine Army Lady Troopers |
| 2023 | PLDT High Speed Hitters |
| 2024–2025 | Choco Mucho Flying Titans |
| 2026–present | Farm Fresh Foxies |

National team
| 2013 | Philippines |

Honey Royse Tubino (born January 12, 1993) is a Filipina professional volleyball player for the Farm Fresh Foxies of the Premier Volleyball League (PVL). She last played for the Choco Mucho Flying Titans.

== Career ==
Tubino was a member of Perpetual Help Lady Altas women's collegiate volleyball team in the NCAA. She played as the Outside Hitter of the team.

== Awards ==
=== Individual ===
| Year | League | Season/Conference | Award | Ref |
|---|---|---|---|---|
| 2012 | SVL | Open | Best attacker | |
| 2013 | NCAA | 88 | Best attacker' | |
| 2013 | PSL | Invitational | Best Spiker | |
| 2014 | NCAA | 89 | Best scorer | |
| 2014 | NCAA | 89 | MVP (Conference) | |
| 2014 | NCAA | 89 | MVP (Finals) | |
| 2015 | SVL | Open | Best Outside Spiker | |
| 2016 | PSL | Invitational | 2nd Best Outside Spiker | |

=== Collegiate ===
==== NCAA ====
| Year | Season | Title | Ref |
|---|---|---|---|
| 2012 | 87 | Champions | |
| 2013 | 88 | Champions | |
| 2014 | 89 | Champions | |

=== Clubs ===
| Year | League | Conference | Clubs | Title | Ref |
|---|---|---|---|---|---|
| 2012 | SVL | 1st | Cagayan Valley Lady Rising Suns | Runner-up | |
| 2013 | SVL | Open | Cagayan Valley Lady Rising Suns | Champions | |
| 2013 | PSL | Invitational | Cignal HD Spikers | Runner-up | |
| 2013 | PSL | Grand Prix | Cignal HD Spikers | Runner-up | |
| 2015 | SVL | Open | Philippine Army Lady Troopers | Runner-up | |
| 2015 | SVL | Reinforced | Philippine Army Lady Troopers | Runner-up | |
| 2017 | PSL | Invitational | Cignal HD Spikers | Champions | |
| 2017 | PSL | All-Filipino | Cignal HD Spikers | 3rd Place | |
| 2019 | PVL | Reinforced | PacificTown-Army Lady Troopers | 3rd Place | |
| 2024 | PVL | All-Filipino | Choco Mucho Flying Titans | Runner-up | |
