= Angelique Dionela =

Filipino volleyball player

Personal information
- Full name: Angelique Dionela
- Nickname: Jheck
- Nationality: Filipino
- Born: January 26, 1991 (age 35)
- Height: 4 ft 11 in (1.50 m)
- Education: University of Perpetual Help System Dalta

Volleyball information
- Position: Libero
- Current club: Farm Fresh Foxies

Career
| Years | Teams |
|---|---|
| 2012–2013 | Cagayan Valley Lady Rising Suns |
| 2013–2024 | Cignal HD Spikers |
| 2024–present | Farm Fresh Foxies |

Angelique Dionela (born January 26, 1991) is a Filipino volleyball player. Dionela played for the University of Perpetual Help System Dalta collegiate women's University team. She is currently playing for the Farm Fresh Foxies in the Premier Volleyball League (PVL).

== Career ==
=== NCAA ===
Dionela was a member of Perpetual Help Lady Altas collegiate women's volleyball team. She is the libero of the team and they won 3 peat championships in the NCAA from NCAA Seasons 85 to 87.

=== Shakey's V-League/PVL ===
In 2012, she won best Digger in the 2013 SVL Open Conference with her team Cagayan Valley Lady Rising Suns.

In 2013, her team Cagayan Valley Lady Rising Suns won in the 2013 SVL Open Conference. After that, she joined Cignal HD Spikers competing in the Philippine Super Liga.

In 2020, Philippine Super Liga cancelled the league because of the COVID-19 pandemic.

In 2021, her team Cignal HD Spikers transferred to Premier Volleyball League.

In 2024, Dionela signed with the Farm Fresh Foxies.

== Clubs ==
- (Philippines) Cagayan Valley Lady Rising Suns (2012–2013)
- (Philippines) Cignal HD Spikers (2013–2024)
- (Philippines) Farm Fresh Foxies (2024–present)

== Awards ==
=== Individual ===
| Year | League | Season/Conference | Award | Ref |
|---|---|---|---|---|
| 2010 | NCAA | 85 | Best Digger | |
| 2012 | NCAA | 87 | Best Receiver | |
| 2012 | SVL | 1st | Best Digger | |
| 2012 | SVL | Open | Best Digger | |
| 2013 | PSL | Invitational | Best Libero | |
| 2017 | PSL | Invitational | Best Libero | |
| 2017 | PSL | All-Filipino | Best Libero | |
| 2019 | PSL | All-Filipino | Best Libero | |

=== Collegiate ===
| Year | NCAA Season | Title | Ref |
|---|---|---|---|
| 2010 | 85 | Champions | |
| 2011 | 86 | Champions | |
| 2012 | 87 | Champions | |

=== Clubs ===
| Year | League | Season/Conference | Club | Title | Ref |
|---|---|---|---|---|---|
| 2012 | SVL | Open | Cagayan Valley Lady Rising Suns | Runner-up | |
| 2013 | SVL | Open | Cagayan Valley Lady Rising Suns | Champions | |
| 2013 | PSL | Invitational | Cignal HD Spikers | Runner-up | |
| 2013 | PSL | Grand Prix | Cignal HD Spikers | Runner-up | |
| 2017 | PSL | Invitational | Cignal HD Spikers | Champions | |
| 2017 | PSL | All-Filipino | Cignal HD Spikers | 3rd Place | |
| 2018 | PSL | Invitational | Cignal HD Spikers | 3rd Place | |
| 2019 | PSL | All-Filipino | Cignal HD Spikers | Runner-up | |
| 2019 | PSL | Invitational | Cignal HD Spikers | 3rd Place | |
| 2022 | PVL | Open | Cignal HD Spikers | 3rd Place | |
| 2022 | PVL | Invitational | Cignal HD Spikers | 3rd Place | |
| 2022 | PVL | Reinforced | Cignal HD Spikers | Runner-up | |
| 2023 | PVL | Invitational | Cignal HD Spikers | 3rd Place | |
| 2023 | PVL | 2nd All-Filipino | Cignal HD Spikers | 3rd Place | |
| 2024 | PNVF | Champions League | Cignal HD Spikers | Runner-up | |
