= List of Shakey's V-League teams =

The Shakey's V-League teams participated in the Shakey's V-League from 2004 to 2016. The league was renamed Premier Volleyball League (PVL) in 2017. The men's division became the Spikers' Turf in 2015 and folded into the PVL as its men's division in 2017.

== Women's division ==
=== Collegiate ===
- Adamson Lady Falcons – Sherwin Meneses
- Arellano Lady Chiefs – Obet Javier
- Ateneo Lady Eagles – Anusorn "Tai" Bundit / Roger Gorayeb / Parley Tupas / Charo Soriano
- Benilde Lady Blazers – Michael Cariño
- FEU Lady Tamaraws – Shaq Delos Santos / Ernesto Pamiliar
- De La Salle University-Dasmarinas Lady Patriots – Raymond Ramirez
- Letran Lady Knights – Brian Esquivel
- Lyceum Lady Pirates – Emil Lontoc
- De La Salle Lady Archers – Ramil de Jesus
- NU Lady Bulldogs – Edjet Mabbayad / Roger Gorayeb
- PCU Lady Dolphins
- PUP Lady Radicals – Wendell Padilla
- San Beda Lady Red Spikers – Nemesio Gavino
- San Sebastian Lady Stags – Roger Gorayeb / Clint Malazo
- SWU Lady Cobras – Jordan Paca
- St. Louis University Lady Navigators – Henry Fuentes
- TIP Lady Engineers – Achilles "Boy" Paril
- University of Batangas Lady Brahmans – Ahmed Aylion
- Perpetual Lady Altas – Sammy Acaylar
- UE Lady Warriors – Francis Vicente
- UP Lady Maroons – Jerry Yee
- University of San Carlos Lady Warriors – Norvie Labuga
- USJ–R Lady Jaguars – Grace Antigua
- USLS Lady Stingers – Roger Banzuela
- UST Golden Tigresses – Emilio "Kungfu" Reyes Jr.

=== Corporate/Club ===
- Baguio Summer Spikers – Clarissa Tolentino
- BaliPure Purest Water Defenders – Anusorn Bundit
- Bureau of Customs Transformers – Sherwin Meneses
- Cagayan Valley Lady Rising Suns – Ernesto Pamilar
- Davao Lady Agilas – Shane Alagao
- Iriga Lady Oragons - Elvis Pabilonia
- Kia Forte – Oliver Almadro
- Laoag Power Smashers – Ernesto Pamilar
- Maynilad Water Dragons
- Meralco – Brian Esquivel
- Smart/Maynilad Net Spikers
- PLDT – Roger Gorayeb
- Pocari Sweat Lady Warriors - Rommel Abella
- Philippine Air Force Jet Spikers - Jasper Jimenez
- Philippine Army Lady Troopers – Emilio "Kungfu" Reyes Jr.
- Philippine Coast Guard Lady Dolphins – Butch Ordon
- Philippine Navy Lady Sailors – Zenaida "Nene" Ybanez-Chavez
- Philippine National Police Lady Patrollers – Argie Dave
- Sandugo/SSC-R Lady Conquerors – Roger Gorayeb
- Fourbees-Perpetual Help – Sammy Acaylar

=== Special teams ===
- PSC Lady Legends — Ramon Suzara
- Smart All-Stars – Roger Gorayeb
- Shakey's All-Stars – Ernesto Pamilar
- Team Palaban All-Stars
- Team Puso All-Stars
- Malaysia Club Team (MAS Club) – Mohd. Shaili Sukor
- (Vietnam) Vietsovpetro – Aleksey Diva

== Men's division ==
- Instituto Estetico Manila Volley Masters – Ernesto Balubar
- Systema Active Smashers – Arnold Laniog
- Rizal Technological University Blue Thunder – George Pascua
- FEU Tamaraws – Florentino "Kid" Santos
