= 2015 Shakey's V-League season =

2015 SVL season
- League: Shakey's V-League
- Sport: Volleyball
- TV partner(s): GMA News TV (local); GMA Pinoy TV (international)

Open Conference
- Season champions: PLDT Home Ultera Ultra Fast Hitters
- Runners-up: Philippine Army Lady Troopers
- Season MVP: Alyssa Valdez (PLDT)

Collegiate Conference
- Season champions: NU Lady Bulldogs
- Runners-up: Ateneo Lady Eagles
- Season MVP: Alyssa Valdez

Reinforced Open Conference
- Season champions: PLDT Home Ultera Ultra Fast Hitters
- Runners-up: Philippine Army Lady Troopers
- Season MVP: Jovelyn Gonzaga (Army)

Seasons
- ← 2014, 11th 13th, 2016 →

The 2015 Shakey's V-League (SVL) season was the twelfth season of the Shakey's V-League (SVL). There were three indoor conferences in the season.

== Open Conference ==
=== Tournament Format ===
==== Preliminaries (PL) ====
Single Round-robin. Top four teams qualify for the semifinals.

==== Semi-finals (SF) ====
The four semi-finalists will compete against each other in a single-round robin phase.

- Top two SF teams will compete for GOLD.
- Bottom two SF teams will compete for BRONZE.

==== Finals ====
The battle for GOLD and the battle for BRONZE will both follow the best-of-three format.

- If the battle for GOLD ends in two matches (2-0), then there will no longer be a Game 3 for either GOLD or Bronze. A tie in the contest for the BRONZE (1-1) will be resolved using FIVB rules.
- A tie in the series for GOLD (1-1) after Game 2 will be broken by a Game 3, regardless of the result of the series in BRONZE.

=== Participating teams ===
Participating Teams
Abbr.	Name	Abbr.	Name
CAG	Cagayan Valley Lady Rising Suns	BAG	Baguio Summer Spikers
FRB	Fourbees-Perpetual Help	MER	MERALCO Power Spikers
PAR	Philippine Army Lady Troopers	PCG	Philippine Coast Guard Lady Dolphins
PNV	Philippine Navy Lady Sailors	PLD	PLDT Home Ultera Ultra Fast Hitters

=== Preliminaries ===
Pos	Team	Pld	W	L	Pts	SW	SL	SR	SPW	SPL	SPR	Qualification
1	PLDT Home Ultera Ultra Fast Hitters	7	7	0	20	21	3	7.000	586	442	1.326	Semifinals
2	Philippine Army Lady Troopers	7	6	1	18	18	4	4.500	539	364	1.481	Semifinals
3	Cagayan Valley Lady Rising Suns	7	5	2	14	16	8	2.000	557	433	1.286	Semifinals
4	MERALCO Power Spikers	7	4	3	13	12	9	1.333	392	382	1.026	Semifinals
5	Philippine Navy Lady Sailors	7	3	4	9	11	14	0.786	501	524	0.956	Eliminated
6	Fourbees-Perpetual Help	7	2	5	6	8	17	0.471	389	500	0.778	Eliminated
7	Baguio Summer Spikers	7	1	6	2	3	20	0.150	372	557	0.668	Eliminated
8	Philippine Coast Guard Lady Dolphins	7	0	7	2	4	21	0.190	388	522	0.743	Eliminated

Date	Time		Score		Set 1	Set 2	Set 3	Set 4	Set 5	Total	Report
04/05	12:45	FRB	0–3	CAG	13-25	12-25	10-25			35–0	
04/05	14:45	PCG	0–3	PNV	24-26	14-25	18-25			56–0	
04/05	16:45	BAG	0–3	PLD	10-25	16-25	21-25			47–0	
04/07	14:00	PNV	0–3	MER	20-25	21-25	21-25			62–0	
04/07	16:00	PAR	3–0	FRB	25-8	25-10	25-11			75–0	
04/09	14:00	FRB	3–2	PCG	25-16	19-25	25-22	26-28	15-11	110–0	
04/09	16:00	CAG	3–0	BAG	25-11	25-9	25-11			75–0	
04/12	12:45	PAR	0–3	PLD	16-25	23-25	26-28			65–0	
04/12	14:45	BAG	0–3	MER	17-25	8-25	14-25			39–0	
04/14	14:00	PNV	0–3	PAR	19-25	12-25	15-25			46–0	
04/14	16:00	PLD	3–0	PCG	25-8	25-22	25-15			75–0	
04/16	14:00	PCG	2–3	BAG	27-25	18-25	25-21	23-25	12-15	105–0	
04/16	16:00	FRB	2–3	PNV	25-23	12-25	15-25	25-20	11-15	88–0	
04/19	12:45	CAG	1–3	PLD	20-25	22-25	28-26	18-25		88–0	
04/19	14:45	PAR	3–1	MER	24-26	25-17	25-20	25-22		99–0	
04/21	14:00	BAG	0–3	PAR	7-25	17-25	10-25			34–0	
04/21	16:00	PCG	0–3	CAG	17-25	10-25	19-25			46–0	
04/23	14:00	FRB	3–0	BAG	25-20	25-20	27-25			77–0	
04/23	16:00	PLD	3–0	PNV	25-14	25-22	25-14			75–0	
04/26	12:45	MER	2–3	PLD	23-25	25-23	25-19	12-25	11-15	96–0	
04/26	14:45	PNV	2–3	CAG	18-25	7-25	25-22	25-23	9-15	84–0	
04/28	14:00	PLD	3–0	FRB	25-20	25-17	25-13			75–0	
04/28	16:00	CAG	3–0	MER	25-21	25-19	25-21			75–0	
04/30	14:00	BAG	0–3	PNV	14-25	19-25	12-25			45–0	
04/30	16:00	PCG	0–3	PAR	8-25	13-25	12-25			33–0	
05/10	12:45	PAR	3–0	CAG	25-16	25-21	25-22			75–0	
05/10	14:45	FRB	0–3	MER	11-25	12-25	14-25			37–0	
05/12	16:00	MER	3–0	PCG	25-20	25-20	25-20			75–0	

=== Semifinals ===
Pos	Team	Pld	W	L	Pts	SW	SL	SR	SPW	SPL	SPR
1	PLDT Home Ultera Ultra Fast Hitters	3	3	0	7	9	4	2.250	295	265	1.113
2	Philippine Army Lady Troopers	3	2	1	6	8	5	1.600	289	272	1.063
3	Cagayan Valley Lady Rising Suns	3	1	2	3	3	6	0.500	198	214	0.925
4	MERALCO Power Spikers	3	0	3	2	4	9	0.444	259	290	0.893

Date	Time		Score		Set 1	Set 2	Set 3	Set 4	Set 5	Total	Report
05/14	12:00	PAR	3–2	MER	25-21	21-25	19-25	25-20	15-9	105–0	
05/14	14:00	PLD	3–0	CAG	25-22	25-14	25-23			75–0	
05/17	12:45	PLD	3–2	PAR	25-21	24-26	20-25	26-24	15-12	110–0	
05/17	14:45	CAG	3–0	MER	25-20	25-22	25-21			75–0	
05/19	14:00	CAG	0–3	PAR	23-25	24-26	17-25			64–0	
05/19	16:00	PLD	3–2	MER	22-25	25-14	20-25	25-16	18-16	110–0	

=== Finals ===
==== Battle for Bronze ====
05/21/2015; 14:00	MERALCO Power Spikers	0–3	Cagayan Valley Lady Rising Suns	Filoil Flying V Arena
05/21/2015; 14:00	(23–25, 21–25, 23–25)			Filoil Flying V Arena

05/24/2015; 09:45	Cagayan Valley Lady Rising Suns	3–1	MERALCO Power Spikers	Filoil Flying V Arena
05/24/2015; 09:45	(25–14, 25–19, 20–25, 25–19)			Filoil Flying V Arena

==== Battle for Gold ====
05/21/2015; 16:00	PLDT Home Ultera Ultra Fast Hitters	1–3	Philippine Army Lady Troopers	Filoil Flying V Arena
05/21/2015; 16:00	(25–13, 23–25, 25–27, 22–25)			Filoil Flying V Arena

05/24/2015; 12:45	Philippine Army Lady Troopers	1–3	PLDT Home Ultera Ultra Fast Hitters	Filoil Flying V Arena
05/24/2015; 12:45	(16–25, 22–25, 25–19, 16–25)			Filoil Flying V Arena

05/31/2015; 12:45	Philippine Army Lady Troopers	2–3	PLDT Home Ultera Ultra Fast Hitters	Filoil Flying V Arena; Attendance: 5,425
05/31/2015; 12:45	(22–25, 25–18, 26–24, 26–28, 13–15)			Filoil Flying V Arena; Attendance: 5,425

=== Final standings ===
Rank	Team
1st place, gold medalist(s)	PLDT Home Ultera Ultra Fast Hitters
2nd place, silver medalist(s)	Philippine Army Lady Troopers
3rd place, bronze medalist(s)	Cagayan Valley Lady Rising Suns
4	MERALCO Power Spikers
5	Philippine Navy Lady Sailors
6	Fourbees-Perpetual Help
7	Baguio Summer Spikers
8	Philippine Coast Guard Lady Dolphins

Shakey's V-League 12th Season Open Conference
PLDT Home Ultera Ultra Fast Hitters

1st title

Team roster
Rubie de Leon, Alyssa Valdez, Suzanne Roces (c), Rysabelle Devanadera, Grethcel Soltones, Alyja Daphne Santiago, Lizlee Ann Gata-Pantone, Elaine Kasilag, Amanda Villanueva, Ma. Asuncion Mendiola, Louann Latigay, Jamenea Ferrer, Dennise Michelle Lazaro, Ma. Rosario Soriano
Head coach
Roger Gorayeb

=== Individual awards ===
Award	Name
Finals MVP	Alyja Daphne Santiago
Conference MVP	Alyssa Valdez
1st Best Outside Spiker	Alyssa Valdez
2nd Best Outside Spiker	Rachel Anne Daquis
1st Best Middle Blocker	Marivic Meneses
2nd Best Middle Blocker	Alyja Daphne Santiago
Best opposite spiker	Jovelyn Gonzaga
Best setter	Rubie de Leon
Best libero	Jennylyn Reyes

== Collegiate Conference ==
=== Tournament Format ===
==== Preliminaries (PL) ====
- Twelve (12) participating teams will be divided into two PL groups - Group A & Group B.
- Each pool will play a single round robin.
- The TOP 4 TEAMS PER POOL (or a total of eight teams) will advance to the quarterfinal Round.
- The bottom two per group will be eliminated from the tournament.

==== Quarterfinals (QF) ====
- The eight quarter finalists will be regrouped into one pool.
- The top four teams after a single round robin will advance to the semi-finals round.

==== Semi-finals (SF) ====
- The four semi-finalists will compete against each other in a best-of-three series as follows: Rank 1 vs Rank 4 and Rank 2 vs Rank 3.
- Top two SF teams will compete for GOLD.
- Bottom two SF teams will compete for BRONZE.

==== Finals ====
The battle for GOLD and the battle for BRONZE will both follow the best-of-three format, provided:

- If the battle for GOLD ends in two matches (2-0), then there will no longer be a Game 3 for either GOLD or Bronze. A tie in BRONZE (1-1) will be resolve using FIVB rules.
- A tie in the series for GOLD (1-1) after Game 2 will be broken in a Game 3, regardless of the result of the series in BRONZE.

=== Participating teams ===
Abbr.	Group A
AUN	Arellano University Lady Chiefs
FEU	Far Eastern University Lady Tamaraws
NUI	National University Lady Bulldogs
PUP	Polytechnic University of the Philippines Lady Radicals
UBM	University of Batangas Lady Brahmans
UPD	University of the Philippines Lady Maroons

Abbr.	Group B
ADM	Ateneo de Manila University Lady Eagles
CSB	College of Saint Benilde Lady Blazers
LSD	De La Salle University-Dasmariñas Lady Patriots
SSC	San Sebastian College – Recoletos de Manila Lady Stags
TIP	Technological Institute of the Philippines Lady Engineers
UST	University of Santo Tomas Tigresses

=== Group A ===
Pos	Team	Pld	W	L	Pts	SW	SL	SR	SPW	SPL	SPR	Qualification
1	National University	5	4	1	12	13	4	3.250	413	358	1.154	Quarterfinals
2	Far Eastern University	5	4	1	12	12	4	3.000	387	312	1.240	Quarterfinals
3	Arellano University	5	4	1	12	12	5	2.400	431	260	1.658	Quarterfinals
4	University of the Philippines	5	2	3	6	8	10	0.800	411	421	0.976	Quarterfinals
5	University of Batangas	5	1	4	3	4	13	0.308	321	419	0.766	Eliminated
6	Polytechnic University of the Philippines	5	0	5	0	1	15	0.067	264	397	0.665	Eliminated

==== Match results ====
Date	Time		Score		Set 1	Set 2	Set 3	Set 4	Set 5	Total	Report
07/11	15:00	FEU	3–0	UBM	25–20	25–18	25–10			75–48	P2
07/12	12:45	UPD	1–3	NUI	25–23	17–25	21–25	18–25		81–98	P2
07/12	17:00	AUN	3–0	PUP	25–17	25–6	25–12			75–35	P2
07/18	17:00	PUP	0–3	UPD	15–25	14–25	13–25			42–75	P2
07/19	15:00	NUI	3–0	UBM	25–16	25–14	25–19			75–49	P2
07/19	17:00	FEU	3–1	AUN	25–23	21–25	25–21	25–16		96–85	P2
07/25	12:45	AUN	3–1	NUI	25–23	25–18	19–25	25–22		94–88	P2
07/25	15:00	FEU	3–0	PUP	25–16	25–14	25–14			75–44	P2
07/26	12:45	UBM	1–3	UPD	26–24	19–25	19–25	20–25		84–99	P2
08/01	15:00	UBM	0–3	AUN	4–25	23–25	15–25			42–75	P2
08/02	12:45	UPD	0–3	FEU	20–25	20–25	19–25			59–75	P2
08/02	17:00	PUP	0–3	NUI	15–25	18–25	15–25			48–75	P2
08/08	12:45	NUI	3–0	FEU	25–23	26–24	25–19			76–66	P2
08/08	15:00	AUN	3–1	UPD	25–23	27–29	25–23	25–22		102–97	P2
08/09	15:00	PUP	1–3	UBM	25–19	22–25	22–25	26–28		95–97	P2

=== Group B ===
Pos	Team	Pld	W	L	Pts	SW	SL	SR	SPW	SPL	SPR	Qualification
1	Ateneo de Manila University	5	5	0	14	15	3	5.000	427	317	1.347	Quarterfinals
2	University of Santo Tomas	5	4	1	11	13	7	1.857	461	386	1.194	Quarterfinals
3	College of Saint Benilde	5	2	3	9	12	10	1.200	455	450	1.011	Quarterfinals
4	De La Salle University-Dasmariñas	5	2	3	6	9	11	0.818	400	448	0.893	Quarterfinals
5	San Sebastian College – Recoletos	5	1	4	3	3	13	0.231	333	392	0.849	Eliminated
6	Technological Institute of the Philippines	5	1	4	2	6	14	0.429	392	466	0.841	Eliminated

==== Match results ====
Date	Time		Score		Set 1	Set 2	Set 3	Set 4	Set 5	Total	Report
07/11	12:45	UST	1–3	ADM	11–25	25–27	25–19	20–25		81–96	P2
07/11	17:00	SSC	0–3	CSB	18–25	24–26	11–25			53–76	P2
07/12	15:00	TIP	3–2	LSD	20–25	17–25	25–23	25–20	15–8	102–101	P2
07/18	12:45	LSD	1–3	UST	13–25	12–25	25–23	18–25		68–98	P2
07/18	15:00	CSB	3–1	TIP	25–16	25–21	19–25	25–22		94–84	P2
07/19	12:45	ADM	3–0	SSC	25–17	25–13	25–21			75–51	P2
07/25	17:00	SSC	3–1	TIP	25–22	25–22	22–25	25–19		97–88	P2
07/26	15:00	UST	3–2	CSB	25–12	17–25	25–21	26–28	15–7	108–93	P2
07/26	17:00	ADM	3–0	LSD	25–13	25–19	25–22			75–54	P2
08/01	12:45	CSB	2–3	ADM	25–23	25–18	8–25	20–25	10–15	88–106	P2
08/01	17:00	LSD	3–0	SSC	27–25	26–24	25–20			78–69	P2
08/02	15:00	TIP	1–3	UST	16–25	19–25	26–24	14–25		75–99	P2
08/08	17:00	ADM	3–0	TIP	25–16	25–14	25–13			75–43	P2
08/09	12:45	SSC	0–3	UST	22–25	15–25	17–25			54–75	P2
08/09	17:00	CSB	2–3	LSD	19–25	21–25	25–15	25–18	14–16	104–99	P2

=== Quarterfinals ===
Pos	Team	Pld	W	L	Pts	SW	SL	SR	SPW	SPL	SPR	Qualification
1	Ateneo de Manila University	7	7	0	20	21	5	4.200	613	494	1.241	Semifinals
2	National University	7	5	2	15	17	7	2.429	576	518	1.112	Semifinals
3	Far Eastern University	7	5	2	14	15	9	1.667	549	467	1.176	Semifinals
4	University of Santo Tomas	7	4	3	10	15	16	0.938	595	594	1.002	Semifinals
5	Arellano University	7	3	4	11	13	14	0.929	619	530	1.168	Eliminated
6	University of the Philippines	7	2	5	7	14	16	0.875	586	616	0.951	Eliminated
7	College of Saint Benilde	7	1	6	5	8	17	0.471	579	663	0.873	Eliminated
8	De La Salle University-Dasmariñas	7	1	6	2	4	20	0.200	405	577	0.702	Eliminated

==== Match results ====
Date	Time		Score		Set 1	Set 2	Set 3	Set 4	Set 5	Total	Report
08/15	12:45	NUI	3–0	LSD	25-17	25-19	25-17			75–0	P2
08/15	15:00	ADM	3–1	UPD	25-18	26-24	20-25	25-15		96–0	P2
08/16	12:45	FEU	3–0	CSB	25-21	25-6	25-17			75–0	P2
08/16	15:00	UST	3–2	AUN	25-21	25-22	19-25	24-26	15–10	108–10	P2
08/22	12:45	UPD	2-3	UST	18-25	25-17	25-23	18-25	15-9	101–0	P2
08/22	15:00	AUN	0–3	ADM	14–25	17–25	19–25			50–75	P2
08/23	12:45	CSB	0–3	NUI	19-25	21-25	18–25			58–25	P2
08/23	15:00	LSD	0–3	FEU	7-25	11-25	15-25			33–0	P2
08/29	12:45	FEU	0–3	ADM	19-25	14-25	18-25			51–0	P2
08/29	15:00	LSD	0–3	AUN	20-25	17-25	15-25			52–0	P2
08/30	12:45	NUI	3–0	UST	25-22	25–23	25–11			75–34	P2
08/30	15:00	CSB	1–3	UPD	25–18	16–25	19–25	19–25		79–93	P2
09/05	12:45	ADM	3–1	NUI	15–25	25–19	25–21	25–23		90–88	P2
09/05	15:00	UST	2–3	FEU	16-25	25-19	29-27	15-25	10-15	95–0	P2
09/06	12:45	UPD	3–0	LSD	25-18	25-10	25-18			75–0	P2
09/06	15:00	AUN	2–3	CSB	25–23	27–25	22–25	23–25	10–15	107–113	P2

=== Semifinals ===
- Ranking is based from the quarter-finals round.
- All series are best-of-3

Semi-finals
ADM	2
UST	1
NUI	2
FEU	0

Final
ADM	1
NUI	2
Third place
UST	0
FEU	2

==== Rank 1 vs Rank 4 ====
Date	Time		Score		Set 1	Set 2	Set 3	Set 4	Set 5	Total	Report
09/12	12:45	ADM	3–0	UST	27–25	25–16	25–17			77–58	P2
09/13	15:00	UST	3–1	ADM	18–25	25–16	25–23	25–22		93–86	P2
09/16	16:00	ADM	3–0	UST	25–18	25–18	25–19			75–55	P2

- Ateneo de Manila University advances to the final round.

==== Rank 2 vs Rank 3 ====
Date	Time		Score		Set 1	Set 2	Set 3	Set 4	Set 5	Total	Report
09/12	15:00	NUI	3–1	FEU	25–15	25–22	25–27	25–23		100–87	P2
09/13	12:45	FEU	1–3	NUI	25–20	13–25	21–25	16–25		75–95	P2

- National University advances to the final round.
- Far Eastern University & University of Santo Tomas will compete for the 3rd place (BRONZE).

=== Finals ===
==== Battle for Bronze ====
September 19, 2015; 12:45	University of Santo Tomas	1–3	Far Eastern University	Filoil Flying V Arena; Attendance: 561; Referees: P. Sison & R. Rojas
September 19, 2015; 12:45	(17–25, 17–25, 25–10, 20–25); Match Result P2			Filoil Flying V Arena; Attendance: 561; Referees: P. Sison & R. Rojas

September 26, 2015; 12:45	Far Eastern University	3-0	University of Santo Tomas	Filoil Flying V Arena; Attendance: 672; Referees: R. Rojas & L. Benito
September 26, 2015; 12:45	(25–16, 25–23, 25–17); Match Result P2			Filoil Flying V Arena; Attendance: 672; Referees: R. Rojas & L. Benito

Far Eastern University wins the series in two games

==== Battle for Gold ====
September 20, 2015; 12:45	Ateneo de Manila University	3–0	National University	Filoil Flying V Arena; Attendance: 2,814; Referees: R. Roxas & P. Sison
September 20, 2015; 12:45	(25–19, 25–13, 25–21); Match Result P2			Filoil Flying V Arena; Attendance: 2,814; Referees: R. Roxas & P. Sison

September 27, 2015; 12:45	National University	3–0	Ateneo de Manila University	Filoil Flying V Arena; Attendance: 4,525; Referees: J. del Rosario & L. Benito
September 27, 2015; 12:45	(25–22, 25–17, 25–17); Match Result P2			Filoil Flying V Arena; Attendance: 4,525; Referees: J. del Rosario & L. Benito

October 4, 2015; 12:45	Ateneo de Manila University	0–3	National University	Filoil Flying V Arena; Attendance: 4,582; Referees: L. Benito & R. Rojas
October 4, 2015; 12:45	(21–25, 24–26, 19–25); Match Result P2			Filoil Flying V Arena; Attendance: 4,582; Referees: L. Benito & R. Rojas

National University wins the series in three games

=== Awards ===
- Most valuable player (Finals)
  - Myla Pablo
- Most valuable player (Conference)
  - Alyssa Valdez
- Best setter
  - Gizelle Tan
- Best Outside Spikers
  - Alyssa Valdez
  - Ennajie Laure
- Best middle blockers
  - Alyja Daphne Santiago
  - Bea De Leon
- Best opposite spiker
  - Jovelyn Gonzaga
- Best libero
  - Fatima Bia General

=== Final standings ===
Rank	Team
1st place, gold medalist(s)	National University Lady Bulldogs
2nd place, silver medalist(s)	Ateneo de Manila University Lady Eagles
3rd place, bronze medalist(s)	Far Eastern University Lady Tamaraws
4	University of Santo Tomas Tigresses
5	Arellano University Lady Chiefs
6	University of the Philippines Lady Maroons
7	College of Saint Benilde Lady Blazers
8	De La Salle University-Dasmariñas Lady Patriots
9	University of Batangas Lady Brahmans
10	San Sebastian College – Recoletos de Manila Lady Stags
11	Technological Institute of the Philippines Lady Engineers
12	Polytechnic University of the Philippines Lady Radicals

Shakey's V-League 12th Season Collegiate Conference Champions
National University Lady Bulldogs
2nd title

Team roster

Rica Diolan, Ivy Perez, Jaja Santiago, Rubie de Leon (G), Fatima General (L), Roma Doromal, Maritess Pablo, Aiko Urdas, Roselyn Doria, Gayle Valdez (L), Jorelle Singh (c), Audrey Paran, Dindin Santiago-Manabat (G), Myla Pablo, Jasmine Nabor
Roger Gorayeb (Head Coach), Edjet Mabayad (Asst. Coach)

Note:

- (G) - Guest Player
- ((c)) - Team Captain
- (L) - Libero

== Reinforced Open Conference ==
=== Preliminaries (PL) ===
Teams will play a single round robin format.

- The TOP 4 TEAMS will advance to the semi-finals (SF) round.
- The bottom two teams will be eliminated from the tournament.

=== Semi-finals (SF) ===
The top four teams at the end of the single-round eliminations will advance to semifinals, with the top two earning a twice-to-beat advantage.

- Semi-finals series: Rank 1 vs Rank 4 and Rank 2 vs Rank 3
- Top two SF teams will compete for GOLD.
- Bottom two SF teams will compete for BRONZE.

=== Finals ===
The battle for GOLD and the battle for BRONZE will both follow the best-of-three format, provided:

- If the battle for GOLD ends in two matches (2-0), then there will no longer be a Game 3 for either GOLD or Bronze. A tie in BRONZE (1-1) will be resolve using FIVB rules.
- A tie in the series for GOLD (1-1) after Game 2 will be broken in a Game 3, regardless of the result of the series in BRONZE.

=== Participating teams ===
Abbr	Team
KIA	Kia Forte
PAR	Philippine Army Lady Troopers
PCG	Philippine Coast Guard Lady Dolphins
PNV	Philippine Navy Lady Sailors
PLD	PLDT Home Ultera Ultra Fast Hitters
UPD	University of the Philippines Lady Maroons

=== Preliminary round ===
Pos	Team	Pld	W	L	Pts	SW	SL	SR	SPW	SPL	SPR	Qualification
1	Philippine Army Lady Troopers	5	5	0	14	15	3	5.000	438	313	1.399	Semifinals
2	PLDT Home Ultera	5	4	1	13	14	6	2.333	462	358	1.291	Semifinals
3	UP Lady Maroons	5	2	3	6	9	10	0.900	401	450	0.891	Semifinals
4	Philippine Navy Lady Sailors	5	2	3	6	8	9	0.889	360	390	0.923	Semifinals
5	Kia Forte	5	1	4	4	6	13	0.462	380	422	0.900	Eliminated
6	Philippine Coast Guard Lady Dolphins	5	1	4	2	3	14	0.214	312	420	0.743	Eliminated

==== Match results ====
Date	Time		Score		Set 1	Set 2	Set 3	Set 4	Set 5	Total	Report
10/10	12:45	PNV	1–3	UPD	25–19	23–25	23–25	23–25	–	94–94	P2
10/11	12:45	PCG	0–3	PLD	10–25	11–25	20–25	–	–	41–75	
10/11	15:00	KIA	0–3	PAR	15–25	18–25	11–25	–	–	44–75	
10/17	12:45	PCG	0–3	PNV	20–25	23–25	21–25	–	–	64–75	P2
10/24	12:45	UPD	3–0	PCG	25–20	25–22	27–25	–	–	77–67	P2
10/25	12:45	KIA	0–3	PNV	18–25	23–25	21–25	–	–	62–75	
10/25	15:00	PAR	3–2	PLD	25–23	23–25	25–11	19–25	15–13	107–97	
10/31	12:45	PLD	3–1	UPD	25–12	22–25	25–15	25–17	–	97–69	P2
10/31	15:00	PCG	3–2	KIA	12–25	25–22	14–25	25–23	17–15	93–110	P2
10/31	17:00	PNV	0–3	PAR	14–25	17–25	14–25	–	–	45–75	P2
11/07	12:45	PLD	3–1	PNV	25–20	20–25	25–13	25–13	–	95–71	P2
11/08	12:45	PAR	3–0	PCG	25–4	25–12	33–31	–	–	83–47	P2
11/08	15:00	UPD	1–3	KIA	22–25	25–19	15-25	19–25	–	81–69	P2
11/14	12:45	PLD	3–1	KIA	25–12	25–12	23–25	25–21	–	98–70	P2
11/14	15:00	PAR	3–1	UPD	23–25	25–18	25–14	25–23	–	98–80	P2

=== Semifinals ===
- Ranking is based from the preliminary round.

Semi-finals
* Rank #1 twice-to-beat
#1 Army Lady Troopers	1
#4 Navy Lady Sailors	0
* Rank #2 twice-to-beat
#2 PLDT Home Ultera	1
#3 UP Lady Maroons	0

Final
best of 3 series
Army Lady Troopers	0
PLDT Home Ultera	2
Third place
best of 3 series
Navy Lady Sailors	0
UP Lady Maroons	2

==== Rank 1 vs Rank 4 ====
- Philippine Army Lady Troopers (Rank #1) had the twice-to-beat advantage

Date	Time		Score		Set 1	Set 2	Set 3	Set 4	Set 5	Total	Report
11/22	12:45	PAR	3–0	PNV	25–16	25–10	25–22	–	–	75–48	P2

==== Rank 2 vs Rank 3 ====
- PLDT Home Ultera (Rank #2) had the twice-to-beat advantage

Date	Time		Score		Set 1	Set 2	Set 3	Set 4	Set 5	Total	Report
11/22	12:45	PLD	3–0	UPD	25–11	25–17	25–17	–	–	75–45	P2

=== Finals ===
==== Battle for Bronze ====
November 28, 2015; 15:00	UP Lady Maroons	3–1	Philippine Navy Lady Sailors	Filoil Flying V Arena; Attendance: 842; Referees: E. Buquid, P. Sison
November 28, 2015; 15:00	(18–25, 25–19, 25–22, 25–10); Match Result P2; POG: #13 Justine Dorog, with 16 attacks and 2 service aces.			Filoil Flying V Arena; Attendance: 842; Referees: E. Buquid, P. Sison

December 6, 2015; 12:45	Philippine Navy Lady Sailors	1–3	UP Lady Maroons	Filoil Flying V Arena; Attendance: 2,571; Referees: D. Malazarte, P. Sison
December 6, 2015; 12:45	(20–25, 26–24, 23–25, 15–25); Match Result P2; POG: #8 Kathy Bersola, with 14 attacks, 3 blocks and 1 service ace.			Filoil Flying V Arena; Attendance: 2,571; Referees: D. Malazarte, P. Sison

University of the Philippines Lady Maroons won the series in two games.

==== Battle for Gold ====
November 28, 2015; 12:45	PLDT Home Ultera	3–2	Philippine Army Lady Troopers	Filoil Flying V Arena; Attendance: 1,732; Referees: J. Villareal, A. Tabañag
November 28, 2015; 12:45	(16–25, 20–25, 26–24, 29–27, 18–16); Match Result P2; POG: #2 Alyssa Valdez with 22 attacks, 1 block & 2 service aces			Filoil Flying V Arena; Attendance: 1,732; Referees: J. Villareal, A. Tabañag

December 6, 2015; 15:00	Philippine Army Lady Troopers	1–3	PLDT Home Ultera	Filoil Flying V Arena; Attendance: 3,628; Referees: R. Rojas, Efren Gaa
December 6, 2015; 15:00	(21–25, 22–25, 25–22, 21–25); Match Result P2; POG: #2 Alyssa Valdez, with 17 attacks, 1 block and 4 service aces			Filoil Flying V Arena; Attendance: 3,628; Referees: R. Rojas, Efren Gaa

PLDT Home Ultera won the series in two games.

=== Final standings ===
Rank	Team
1st place, gold medalist(s)	PLDT Home Ultera
2nd place, silver medalist(s)	Philippine Army Lady Troopers
3rd place, bronze medalist(s)	University of the Philippines Lady Maroons
4	Philippine Navy Lady Sailors
5	Kia Forte
6	Philippine Coast Guard Lady Dolphins

Shakey's V-League 12th Season Reinforced Open Conference Champions
PLDT Home Ultera Ultra Fast Hitters
2nd title

Team roster

Rubie De Leon, Alyssa Valdez, Sue Roces (c), Sasa Devanadera, Ella de Jesus (L), Grethcel Soltones, (United States) Sareea Freeman, Aiza Maizo-Pontillas, Janine Marciano, (United States) Victoria Hurtt, Louann Latigay, Jem Ferrer, Charo Soriano, Tatan Gata-Pantone (L)
Roger Gorayeb (Head Coach), Clint Malazo (Asst. Coach)

Note
((c)) – Team Captain
(L) – Libero

=== Awards ===
- Most valuable player (Finals)
  - Alyssa Valdez ( PLDT)
- Most valuable player (Conference)
  - Jovelyn Gonzaga ( Army)
- Best setter
  - Janet Serafica ( Navy)
- Best Outside Spikers
  - Honey Royse Tubino ( Army)
  - Janine Marciano ( PLDT)
- Best middle blockers
  - Kathy Bersola ( UP)
  - Sheena Mae Chopitea ( UP)
- Best opposite spiker
  - Jovelyn Gonzaga ( Army)
- Best libero
  - Lizlee Ann Gata-Pantone ( PLDT)

== Conference result ==
Rank	Open	Collegiate	Reinforced
1st place, gold medalist(s)	PLDT Home Ultera Ultra Fast Hitters	NU Lady Bulldogs	PLDT Home Ultera
2nd place, silver medalist(s)	Philippine Army Lady Troopers	Ateneo Lady Eagles	Philippine Army Lady Troopers
3rd place, bronze medalist(s)	Cagayan Valley Lady Rising Suns	FEU Lady Tamaraws	UP Lady Maroons
4	Meralco Power Spikers	Benilde Lady Blazers	Philippine Navy Lady Sailors
5	Philippine Navy Lady Sailors	Arellano Lady Chiefs	Kia Forte
6	Fourbees-Perpetual Help	UP Lady Maroons	Philippine Coast Guard Lady Dolphins
7	Baguio Summer Spikers	Benilde Lady Blazers	—N/a
8	Philippine Coast Guard Lady Dolphins	La Salle Dasma Lady Patriots	—N/a
9	—N/a	UB Lady Brahmans	—N/a
10	—N/a	San Sebastian Lady Stags	—N/a
11	—N/a	TIP Lady Engineers	—N/a
12	—N/a	PUP Lady Radicals	—N/a

== Broadcast partners ==
- GMA News TV (local)
- GMA Life TV (international)
