= Jennylyn Reyes =

Filipino volleyball player

Personal information
- Nickname: Jen
- Nationality: Filipino
- Born: 12 January 1991 (age 35)
- Height: 1.57 m (5 ft 2 in)
- Weight: 51 kg (112 lb)
- Spike: 258 cm (102 in)
- Block: 240 cm (94 in)
- Education: National University

Volleyball information
- Position: Libero
- Current club: Foton Tornadoes
- Number: 12

Career
Years	Teams
2011	Philippine Army Lady Troopers
2013	Cignal HD Spikers
2013	Cagayan Valley Lady Rising Suns
2013–2015	Meralco Power Spikers
2014–2016	Petron Tri-Activ Spikers
2015	Kia Forte
2016	Foton Pilipinas
2016	PSL-F2 Logistics Manila
2017–2020	Foton Tornadoes

Jennylyn Reyes (born January 12, 1991) is a Filipino volleyball athlete.

== Career ==
Reyes played for Meralco Power Spikers from 2013 to 2015. She was awarded Best Libero in the 2015 Philippine Super Liga All-Filipino. She played for Petron Tri-Activ Spikers before being selected to play with Foton Pilipinas in the 2016 Asian Club Championship and with PSL Manila for the 2016 FIVB Club World Championship. She won the bronze medal in the 2017 PSL Grand Prix Conference with the Foton Tornadoes.

== Clubs ==
- (Philippines) Philippine Army Lady Troopers (2011)
- (Philippines) Cignal HD Spikers (2013)
- (Philippines) Cagayan Valley Lady Rising Suns (2013)
- (Philippines) Meralco Power Spikers (2013–2015)
- (Philippines) Petron Tri-Activ Spikers (2014–2016)
- (Philippines) Kia Forte (2015)
- (Philippines) Foton Pilipinas (2016)
- (Philippines) PSL Manila (2016)
- (Philippines) Foton Tornadoes (2017–2020)

== Awards ==
=== Individuals ===
- UAAP Season 73 "Best Digger"
- Shakey's V-League 8th Season - 1st Conference "Best Digger"
- Shakey's V-League 8th Season - Open Conference "Best Receiver"
- UAAP Season 75 "Best Receiver"
- UAAP Season 75 "Best Digger"
- Shakey's V-League 10th Season - 1st Conference "Best Receiver"
- Shakey's V-League 10th Season - Open Conference "Best Receiver"
- 2013 Philippine Super Liga Invitational "Best Receiver"
- 2014 Philippine Super Liga Grand Prix "Best Libero"
- Shakey's V-League 12th Season - Open Conference "Best Libero"
- 2015 Philippine Super Liga All-Filipino "Best Libero"
- 2015 Philippine Super Liga Grand Prix "Best Libero"

=== Clubs ===
- 2017 Philippine Superliga Grand Prix – Bronze medal, with Foton Tornadoes
