= 2011 Shakey's V-League season =

2011 SVL season
- League: Shakey's V-League
- Sport: Volleyball
- TV partner: NBN-4

1st
- Season champions: Ateneo Lady Eagles
- Runners-up: Adamson Lady Falcons
- Season MVP: Lithawat Kesinee ( Ateneo)

Open
- Season champions: Philippine Army Lady Troopers
- Runners-up: San Sebastian Lady Stags
- Season MVP: Lauren Ford ( San Sebastian)

SEA Club Invitational
- Season champions: (Vietnam) Vietsovpetro
- Runners-up: Philippine Army Lady Troopers
- Season MVP: Ekaterina Martynova (Vietsovpetro)

Seasons
- ← 2010, 7th 9th, 2012 →

The 2011 Shakey's V-League (SVL) season was the eighth season of the Shakey's V-League. There were three indoor conferences in 2011 season.

== 1st Conference ==
The Shakey's V-League 8th Season 1st Conference was the thirteenth conference of Shakey's V-League, a collegiate women's volleyball league in the Philippines founded in 2004. The conference started April 3, 2011 at The Arena in San Juan.

The teams were divided into two groups that played a single round robin. Group A was comprised Ateneo, FEU, San Sebastian, Southwestern University, and Lyceum. Group B had Adamson, CSB, University of St. La Salle (Bacolod), UPHSD, and NU. The top four teams in each group advanced to the quarterfinal round. The eight teams were again divided into two groups and played one round. The top two teams in each group advanced to a crossover best-of-three semifinals, winners of the semifinals advanced to the finals which is also a best-of-three series.

=== Participating teams ===
Abbr.	Team
ADM	Ateneo de Manila University Lady Eagles
ADU	Adamson University Lady Falcons
CSB	College of St. Benilde Lady Blazers
FEU	Far Eastern University Lady Tamaraws
LPU	Lyceum of the Philippines University Lady Pirates
NUI	National University Lady Bulldogs
SSC	San Sebastian College–Recoletos Lady Stags
SWU	Southwestern University Lady Cobras
UPH	University of Perpetual Help Lady Altas
USL	University of St. La Salle Lady Stingers

Final round

- All times are in Philippine Standard Time (UTC+08:00)

3rd place

Date	Time	Teams	Set	1	2	3	4	5	Total	Report
May 15	14:00	NU Lady Bulldogs	1	25	15	23	22		85	
May 15	14:00	USLS Lady Stingers	3	16	25	25	25		91	
May 17	14:00	USLS Lady Stingers	3	25	25	25			75	
May 17	14:00	NU Lady Bulldogs	0	17	21	23			61	

Championship

Date	Time	Teams	Set	1	2	3	4	5	Total	Report
May 15	16:00	Ateneo Lady Eagles	3	23	25	25	25		98	
May 15	16:00	Adamson Lady Falcons	1	25	18	20	20		83	
May 17	16:00	Ateneo Lady Eagles	3	24	25	25	19	15	108	
May 17	16:00	Adamson Lady Falcons	2	26	18	22	25	11	102	

Final standings

Rank	Team
1st place, gold medalist(s)	Ateneo de Manila University Lady Eagles
2nd place, silver medalist(s)	Adamson University Lady Falcons
3rd place, bronze medalist(s)	University of St. La Salle Lady Stingers
4	National University Lady Bulldogs
5	University of Perpetual Help Lady Altas
6	Lyceum of the Philippines University Lady Pirates
7	Southwestern University Lady Cobras
8	Far Eastern University Lady Tamaraws
9	San Sebastian College–Recoletos Lady Stags
10	College of St. Benilde Lady Blazers

Individual awards

Award		Name
Most Valuable Player	Finals: Conference:	(Philippines) Jamenea Ferrer ( Ateneo) (Thailand) Lithawat Kesinee ( Ateneo)
Best Scorer		(Philippines) Patty Jane Orendain ( USLS)
Best Attacker		(Philippines) Nerissa Bautista ( Adamson)
Best Blocker		(Philippines) Aleona Denise Santiago ( NU)
Best Server		(Philippines) April Ross Hingpit ( USLS)
Best Setter		(Philippines) May Jennifer Macatuno ( Adamson)
Best Digger		(Philippines) Jennylyn Reyes ( NU)
Best Receiver		(Philippines) Dennise Michelle Lazaro ( Ateneo)
Most Improved Player		(Philippines) Fille Saint Merced Cainglet ( Ateneo)

== Open Conference ==
The Shakey's V-League 8th Season Open Conference was the fourteenth conference of Shakey's V-League, commenced on July 31, 2011 at The Arena in San Juan with four commercial clubs joining regular league teams Ateneo de Manila University, San Sebastian College–Recoletos and University of Perpetual Help System DALTA.

=== Participating teams ===
Abbr.	Team
ADM	Ateneo de Manila University Lady Eagles
MAY	Maynilad Water Dragons
PAF	Philippine Air Force Lady Jet Spikers
PAR	Philippine Army Lady Troopers
PNV	Philippine Navy Lady Sailors
SSC	San Sebastian College–Recoletos Lady Stags
UPH	University of Perpetual Help Lady Altas

Final round

- All times are in Philippine Standard Time (UTC+08:00)

3rd place

Date	Time	Teams	Set	1	2	3	4	5	Total	Report
Sep 18	14:00	Ateneo Lady Eagles	3	25	23	25	14	15	102	
Sep 18	14:00	Philippine Navy Lady Sailors	2	22	25	19	25	8	99	
Sep 22	14:00	Ateneo Lady Eagles	3	24	25	25	19	15	108	
Sep 22	14:00	Philippine Navy Lady Sailors	2	26	20	18	25	10	99	

Championship

Date	Time	Teams	Set	1	2	3	4	5	Total	Report
Sep 18	16:00	Philippine Army Lady Troopers	3	25	25	25			75	
Sep 18	16:00	San Sebastian Lady Stags	0	9	20	16			45	
Sep 22	16:00	Philippine Army Lady Troopers	3	27	20	22	25	15	109	
Sep 22	16:00	San Sebastian Lady Stags	2	25	25	25	23	10	108	

Final standings

Rank	Team
1st place, gold medalist(s)	Philippine Army Lady Troopers
2nd place, silver medalist(s)	San Sebastian College–Recoletos Lady Stags
3rd place, bronze medalist(s)	Ateneo de Manila University Lady Eagles
4	Philippine Navy Lady Sailors
5	Philippine Air Force Lady Jet Spikers
6	Maynilad Water Dragons
7	University of Perpetual Help Lady Altas

Individual awards

Award	Name
Most Valuable Player	Finals: (Philippines) Rachel Anne Daquis ( Army)
Most Valuable Player	Conference: (United States) Lauren Ford ( San Sebastian)
Best Scorer	(United States) Lauren Ford ( San Sebastian)
Best Attacker	(Philippines) Marietta Carolino ( Army)
Best Blocker	(Philippines) Suzanne Roces ( San Sebastian)
Best Server	(Philippines) Rubie De Leon ( San Sebastian)
Best Setter	(Philippines) Jamenea Ferrer ( Ateneo)
Best Digger	(Philippines) Dennise Michelle Lazaro ( Ateneo)
Best Receiver	(Philippines) Jennylyn Reyes ( Army)

== SEA Club Invitational ==
The Shakey's V-League 8th Season Southeast Asian Club Invitational was the fifteenth conference of Shakey's V-League, commenced on October 27, 2011 at The Arena in San Juan with clubs from Vietnam and Malaysia participating in the four-team tournament that also features local teams Philippine Army Lady Troopers and Ateneo Lady Eagles. Matches were aired on NBN 4 on a delayed basis.

=== Participating teams ===
Abbr.	Team
ADM	(Philippines) Ateneo de Manila University Lady Eagles
MAS	Malaysia Club
PAR	(Philippines) Philippine Army Lady Troopers
VIE	(Vietnam) Vietsovpetro

Final round

- All times are in Philippine Standard Time (UTC+08:00)

3rd place

Date	Time	Teams	Set	1	2	3	4	5	Total	Report
Oct 30	14:00	(Philippines) Ateneo Lady Eagles	0	22	21	13			56	
Oct 30	14:00	Malaysia Club	3	25	25	25			75	

Championship

Date	Time	Teams	Set	1	2	3	4	5	Total	Report
Oct 30	16:00	(Philippines) Philippine Army Lady Troopers	2	25	25	21	23	8	102	
Oct 30	16:00	(Vietnam) Vietsovpetro	3	18	14	25	25	15	97	

Final standings

Rank	Team
1st place, gold medalist(s)	(Vietnam) Vietsovpetro
2nd place, silver medalist(s)	(Philippines) Philippine Army Lady Troopers
3rd place, bronze medalist(s)	Malaysia Club
4	(Philippines) Ateneo de Manila University Lady Eagles

Individual awards

Award	Name
Most Valuable Player	(Russia) Ekaterina Martynova (Vietsovpetro)
Best Scorer	(Russia) Ekaterina Martynova (Vietsovpetro)
Best Attacker	(Russia) Anactaxia Trernai (Vietsovpetro)
Best Blocker	Wong Fei Tien (Malaysia Club)
Best Server	(Philippines) Mary Jean Balse (Philippine Army)
Best Setter	(Philippines) Jamenea Ferrer (Ateneo)
Best Digger	(Philippines) Dennise Michelle Lazaro (Ateneo)
Best Receiver	(Vietnam) Tuyen Bui Vu Tuhani (Vietsovpetro)
