= 2012 Shakey's V-League season =

2012 SVL season
- League: Shakey's V-League
- Sport: Volleyball
- TV partner(s): TV5 (AKTV on IBC-13), Hyper

1st Conference
- Season champions: Ateneo Lady Eagles
- Runners-up: UST Growling Tigresses
- Season MVP: Jaroensri Bualee

Open Conference
- Season champions: Sandugo-SSC-R
- Runners-up: UPHD–Cagayan
- Season MVP: Sandra Delos Santos

Seasons
- ← 2011, 8th 10th, 2013 →

The 2012 Shakey's V-League (SVL) season was the ninth season of the Shakey's V-League. There were two indoor conferences for this season.

== 1st Conference ==
The Shakey's V-League 9th Season 1st Conference was the sixteenth conference of Shakey's V-League, a collegiate women's volleyball league in the Philippines founded in 2004. The opening ceremonies was held on April 24, 2012 at the Filoil Flying V Arena in San Juan.

Participating teams

Pool A

Abbr.	Team
ADM	Ateneo de Manila University Lady Eagles
FEU	Far Eastern University Lady Tamaraws
NUI	National University Lady Bulldogs
SWU	Southwestern University Lady Cobras
UPH	University of Perpetual Help Lady Altas

Pool B

Abbr.	Team
ADU	Adamson University Lady Falcons
CSL	Colegio de San Juan de Letran Lady Knights
SSC	San Sebastian College–Recoletos Lady Stags
USL	University of St. La Salle Lady Stingers
UST	University of Santo Tomas Tigresses

=== Preliminary round ===
Pool A

Pos	Team	Pld	W	L	Pts	SW	SL	SR	SPW	SPL	SPR	Qualification
1	Ateneo Lady Eagles	4	4	0	8	12	2	6.000	340	254	1.339	Qualified to the quarterfinals
2	Perpetual Lady Altas	4	3	1	7	9	5	1.800	310	288	1.076	Qualified to the quarterfinals
3	FEU Lady Tamaraws	4	2	2	6	7	6	1.167	283	258	1.097	Qualified to the quarterfinals
4	NU Lady Bulldogs	4	1	3	5	6	10	0.600	326	364	0.896	Qualified to the quarterfinals
5	SWU Lady Cobras	4	0	4	4	1	12	0.083	225	320	0.703	

Rules for classification: 1) number of wins; 2) head-to-head record; 3) match points; 4) sets ratio; 5) points ratio

Pool B

Pos	Team	Pld	W	L	Pts	SW	SL	SR	SPW	SPL	SPR	Qualification
1	UST Growling Tigresses	4	4	0	8	12	1	12.000	320	220	1.455	Qualified to the quarterfinals
2	San Sebastian Lady Stags	4	3	1	7	9	5	1.800	307	294	1.044	Qualified to the quarterfinals
3	Adamson Lady Falcons	4	2	2	6	8	9	0.889	366	371	0.987	Qualified to the quarterfinals
4	USLS Lady Stingers	4	1	3	5	6	11	0.545	336	378	0.889	Qualified to the quarterfinals
5	Letran Lady Knights	4	0	4	4	3	12	0.250	276	342	0.807	

Rules for classification: 1) number of wins; 2) head-to-head record; 3) match points; 4) sets ratio; 5) points ratio

=== Quarterfinals ===
Pos	Team	Pld	W	L	Pts	SW	SL	SR	SPW	SPL	SPR	Qualification
1	Ateneo Lady Eagles	8	8	0	16	24	5	4.800	690	553	1.248	Qualified to the semifinals
2	UST Growling Tigresses	8	7	1	15	22	5	4.400	653	502	1.301	Qualified to the semifinals
3	San Sebastian Lady Stags	8	6	2	14	19	13	1.462	673	666	1.011	Qualified to the semifinals
4	Perpetual Lady Altas	8	5	3	13	17	13	1.308	651	638	1.020	Qualified to the semifinals
5	Adamson Lady Falcons	8	3	5	11 (Note: Head-to-head record: Adamson 1–0 USLS)	12	18	0.667	663	663	1.000	
6	USLS Lady Stingers	8	3	5	11	14	19	0.737	690	700	0.986	
7	NU Lady Bulldogs	8	2	6	10 (Note: Head-to-head record: NU 1–0 FEU)	12	19	0.632	559	603	0.927	
8	FEU Lady Tamaraws	8	2	6	10	10	18	0.556	540	614	0.879	

Rules for classification: 1) number of wins; 2) head-to-head record; 3) match points; 4) sets ratio; 5) points ratio

=== Final round ===
Quarterfinal		W	L
1	Ateneo	8	0
2	UST	7	1
3	San Sebastian	6	2
4	Perpetual	5	3
5	Adamson	3	5
6	USLS	3	5
7	NU	2	6
8	FEU	2	6

Semifinals
Ateneo	3	3
Perpetual	0	0
UST	3	2	3
San Sebastian	2	3	0

Final
Ateneo	1	3	3
UST	3	1	2
Bronze medal game
San Sebastian	3	3
Perpetual	2	1

Final standings

Rank	Team
1st place, gold medalist(s)	Ateneo de Manila University
2nd place, silver medalist(s)	University of Santo Tomas
3rd place, bronze medalist(s)	San Sebastian College–Recoletos
4	University of Perpetual Help System DALTA
5	Adamson University
6	University of St. La Salle
7	National University
8	Far Eastern University
9	Colegio de San Juan de Letran
10	Southwestern University

Individual awards

Award		Name
Most Valuable Player	Finals: Conference:	(Philippines) Alyssa Valdez ( Ateneo) (Thailand) Jaroensri Bualee ( San Sebastian)
Best Scorer		(Thailand) Jaroensri Bualee ( San Sebastian)
Best Attacker		(Thailand) Utaiwan Kaensing ( UST)
Best Blocker		(Thailand) Lithawat Kesinee ( Ateneo)
Best Server		(Philippines) Judy Caballejo ( UST)
Best Setter		(Philippines) Jamenea Ferrer ( Ateneo)
Best Digger		(Philippines) Angelique Beatrice Dionela ( Perpetual)
Best Receiver		(Philippines) Dennise Michelle Lazaro ( Ateneo)
Most Improved Player		(Philippines) Sandra delos Santos ( Perpetual)

== Open Conference ==
The Shakey's V-League 9th Season Open Conference was the seventeenth conference of the Shakey's V-League, commenced on August 19, 2012 at the Ninoy Aquino Stadium in Manila with four commercial clubs joining regular league teams Ateneo de Manila University and Far Eastern University.

Shakey's V-League 9th Season Open Conference Participating Teams
Abbr.	Team	Colors	Head coach	Team captain
ADM	Ateneo de Manila University Lady Eagles		Parley Tupas	Gretchen Ho
CAG	Cagayan Valley Lady Rising Suns-UPHSD		Mike Rafael	Maria Angeli Tabaquero
FEU	Far Eastern University Lady Tamaraws		Ernesto Pamilar	Yna Louise Papa
PAR	Philippine Army Lady Troopers		Rico de Guzman	Mayeth Carolino
PNV	Philippine Navy Lady Sailors		Zenaida Chavez	Janeth Serafica
SSC	Sandugo–SSC–R Lady Stags		Roger Gorayeb	Suzanne Roces

=== Final round ===
- All series are best-of-3

Semifinals
1	Sandugo–SSC-R	3	3
4	Ateneo Lady Eagles	0	0
3	Cagayan Valley Lady Rising Suns	3	3
2	Philippine Army Lady Troopers	0	0

Finals
Sandugo–SSC-R	3	3
Cagayan Valley Lady Rising Suns	2	0
3rd place
Philippine Army Lady Troopers	2	3
Ateneo Lady Eagles	3	0

==== Match results ====
- All times are in Philippines Standard Time (UTC+08:00)

Semifinals

==== Rank 1 vs Rank 4 ====
Date	Time	Teams	Set	1	2	3	4	5	Total	Report
Sep 12	18:00	Sandugo-SSC-R	3	25	25	25			75	
Sep 12	18:00	Ateneo Lady Eagles	0	13	20	9			42	
Sep 14	16:00	Sandugo-SSC-R	3	25	25	25			75	
Sep 14	16:00	Ateneo Lady Eagles	0	9	14	19			42	

==== Rank 2 vs Rank 3 ====
Date	Time	Teams	Set	1	2	3	4	5	Total	Report
Sep 12	16:00	Philippine Army Lady Troopers	0	20	15	20			55	
Sep 12	16:00	Cagayan Valley Lady Rising Suns	3	25	25	25			75	
Sep 14	18:00	Philippine Army Lady Troopers	2	25	15	26	18	7	91	
Sep 14	18:00	Cagayan Valley Lady Rising Suns	3	17	25	24	25	15	106	

3rd place

Date	Time	Teams	Set	1	2	3	4	5	Total	Report
Sep 16	16:00	Philippine Army Lady Troopers	2	21	25	22	25	15	108	
Sep 16	16:00	Ateneo Lady Eagles	3	25	19	25	18	13	100	
Sep 18	16:00	Philippine Army Lady Troopers	3	25	25	25			75	
Sep 18	16:00	Ateneo Lady Eagles	1	17	10	18			45	

Championship

Date	Time	Teams	Set	1	2	3	4	5	Total	Report
Sep 16	18:00	Sandugo–SSC-R	3	18	29	14	25	15	101	
Sep 16	18:00	Cagayan Valley Lady Rising Suns	2	25	27	25	13	7	97	
Sep 18	18:00	Sandugo–SSC-R	3	25	25	25			75	
Sep 18	18:00	Cagayan Valley Lady Rising Suns	0	18	22	16			56	

Final standings

Rank	Team
1st place, gold medalist(s)	Sandugo–SSC-R
2nd place, silver medalist(s)	Cagayan-UPHSD
3rd place, bronze medalist(s)	Philippine Army Lady Troopers
4	Ateneo Lady Eagles
5	Philippine Navy Lady Sailors
6	FEU Lady Tamaraws

Individual awards

Award		Name
Most Valuable Player	Finals: Conference:	(Thailand) Jaroensri Bualee (Sandugo-SSC-R) (Philippines) Sandra Delos Santos (Cagayan)
Best Scorer		(Thailand) Jaroensri Bualee (Sandugo-SSC-R)
Best Attacker		(Philippines) Honey Royse Tubino (Cagayan)
Best Blocker		(Thailand) Utaiwan Kaensing (Sandugo-SSC-R)
Best Server		(Philippines) Joy Cases (Cagayan)
Best Setter		(Philippines) Tina Salak (Army)
Best Digger		(Philippines) Angelique Beatrice Dionela (Cagayan)
Best Receiver		(Philippines) Angela Nunag (Army)

== Broadcast partner ==
- TV5 (AKTV on IBC-13)
- Hyper
