= 2012 Shakey's V-League Open Conference =

Shakey's V-League 9th Season Open Conference
Women's Finals	G1	G2	Wins
Sandugo-SSC-R	3	3	2
Cagayan-UPHD	2	0	0
- Duration: Aug. 19 – Sep. 18, 2012
- Arena(s): Ninoy Aquino Stadium
- Finals MVP: Jaroensri Bualee
- Winning coach: Roger Gorayeb
- Semifinalists: Philippine Army Lady Troopers; Ateneo de Manila University Lady Eagles
- TV network(s): TV5 (AKTV on IBC-13), Hyper

The 2012 Shakey's V-League Open Conference was the 17th conference of the Shakey's V-League and the second conference of the 2012 season. It commenced on August 19, 2012, at the Ninoy Aquino Stadium in Manila with four commercial clubs joining regular league teams Ateneo de Manila University and Far Eastern University.

== Participating teams ==
Shakey's V-League 9th Season Open Conference Participating Teams
Abbr.	Team	Colors	Head coach	Team captain
ADM	Ateneo de Manila University Lady Eagles		Parley Tupas	Gretchen Ho
CAG	Cagayan Valley Lady Rising Suns-UPHSD		Mike Rafael	Maria Angeli Tabaquero
FEU	Far Eastern University Lady Tamaraws		Ernesto Pamilar	Yna Louise Papa
PAR	Philippine Army Lady Troopers		Rico de Guzman	Mayeth Carolino
PNV	Philippine Navy Lady Sailors		Zenaida Chavez	Janeth Serafica
SSC	Sandugo–SSC–R Lady Stags		Roger Gorayeb	Suzanne Roces

== Tournament Format ==
- Preliminaries

- Double round robin preliminary

- Semifinals

- Top four teams after preliminary round will enter crossover semifinal
- Rank#1 vs Rank#4 & Rank#2 vs Rank#3
- Best-of-three series

- Finals

- Best-of-three series for the Final and Bronze matches

== Preliminary round ==
Pos	Team	Pld	W	L	Pts	SW	SL	SR	SPW	SPL	SPR	Qualification
1	Sandugo–SSC–R Lady Stags	10	9	1	26	29	9	3.222	853	739	1.154	Qualified for Semifinals
2	Philippine Army Lady Troopers	10	8	2	23	27	14	1.929	926	824	1.124	Qualified for Semifinals
3	Cagayan Valley Lady Rising Suns	10	7	3	23	25	10	2.500	808	664	1.217	Qualified for Semifinals
4	Ateneo de Manila University Lady Eagles	10	3	7	8	13	23	0.565	782	811	0.964	Qualified for Semifinals
5	Philippine Navy Lady Sailors	10	2	8	5	7	27	0.259	614	823	0.746	
6	Far Eastern University Lady Tamaraws	10	1	9	5	10	28	0.357	749	861	0.870	

All times are Philippine Standard Time (UTC+08:00)

Date	Time		Score		Set 1	Set 2	Set 3	Set 4	Set 5	Total	Report
Aug 19	14:00	PAR	3–0	PNV	25–14	25–14	25–13			75–41	
Aug 19	16:00	FEU	0–3	CAG	20–25	12–25	21–25			53–75	
Aug 19	18:00	SSC	3–0	ADM	27–25	25–19	25–20			77–64	
Aug 21	14:00	CAG	2–3	SSC	23–25	22–25	25–15	25–21	10–15	105–101	
Aug 21	16:00	ADM	3–0	PNV	25–11	25–21	25–19			75–51	
Aug 21	18:00	FEU	1–3	PAR	25–18	20–25	22–25	17–25		84–93	
Aug 24	14:00	PAR	3–2	CAG	17–25	25–20	25–18	20–25	15–10	102–98	
Aug 24	16:00	PNV	0–3	SSC	13–25	18–25	14–25			45–75	
Aug 24	18:00	ADM	3–0	FEU	25–13	25–18	25–14			75–45	
Aug 26	14:00	ADM	0–3	CAG	19–25	25–27	16–25			60–77	
Aug 26	16:00	PNV	3–2	FEU	15–25	25–23	15–25	25–23	16–14	96–110	
Aug 26	18:00	PAR	2–3	SSC	16–25	25–17	25–17	18–25	10–15	94–99	
Aug 28	14:00	CAG	3–0	PNV	25–14	25–14	25–9			75–37	
Aug 28	16:00	FEU	0–3	SSC	8–25	23–25	13–25			44–75	
Aug 28	18:00	PAR	3–1	ADM	25–15	25–21	20–25	25–21		95–82	
Aug 31	14:00	FEU	0–3	CAG	18–25	10–25	15–25			43–75	
Aug 31	16:00	PAR	3–0	PNV	25–20	25–11	25–23			75–54	
Aug 31	18:00	ADM	1–3	SSC	25–20	17–25	15–25	23–25		80–95	
Sep 2	14:00	CAG	3–0	PNV	25–17	25–17	25–19			75–53	
Sep 2	16:00	FEU	2–3	ADM	25–22	25–15	21–25	14–25	16–18	101–105	
Sep 2	18:00	PAR	3–2	SSC	25–21	25–22	16–25	12–25	15–8	93–101	
Sep 3	14:00	PAR	1–3	CAG	25–23	22–25	18–25	17–25		82–98	
Sep 3	16:00	PNV	3–1	ADM	25–21	19–25	27–25	25–23		96–94	
Sep 3	18:00	FEU	1–3	SSC	23–25	19–25	25–23	25–15		92–88	
Sep 8	14:00	FEU	3–1	PNV	25–17	19–25	25–17	25–23		94–82	
Sep 8	16:00	ADM	1–3	PAR	25–23	18–25	22–25	24–26		89–99	
Sep 8	18:00	SSC	3–0	CAG	25–14	25–19	25–22			75–55	
Sep 10	14:00	PNV	0–3	SSC	18–25	12–25	29–25			59–75	
Sep 10	16:00	PAR	3–1	FEU	22–25	25–22	25–20	25–16		97–83	
Sep 10	18:00	ADM	0–3	CAG	21–25	20–25	17–25			58–75	

== Final round ==
- All series are best-of-3

Semifinals
1	Sandugo-SSC-R	3	3
4	Ateneo Lady Eagles	0	0
3	Cagayan Valley Lady Rising Suns	3	3
2	Philippine Army Lady Troopers	0	0

Finals
Sandugo-SSC-R	3	3
Cagayan Valley Lady Rising Suns	2	0
3rd place
Philippine Army Lady Troopers	2	3
Ateneo Lady Eagles	3	0

=== Match results ===
- All times are in Philippines Standard Time (UTC+08:00)

Semifinals

==== Rank 1 vs Rank 4 ====
Date	Time	Teams	Set	1	2	3	4	5	Total	Report
Sep 12	18:00	Sandugo-SSC-R	3	25	25	25			75	
Sep 12	18:00	Ateneo Lady Eagles	0	13	20	9			42	
Sep 14	16:00	Sandugo-SSC-R	3	25	25	25			75	
Sep 14	16:00	Ateneo Lady Eagles	0	9	14	19			42	

==== Rank 2 vs Rank 3 ====
Date	Time	Teams	Set	1	2	3	4	5	Total	Report
Sep 12	16:00	Philippine Army Lady Troopers	0	20	15	20			55	
Sep 12	16:00	Cagayan Valley Lady Rising Suns	3	25	25	25			75	
Sep 14	18:00	Philippine Army Lady Troopers	2	25	15	26	18	7	91	
Sep 14	18:00	Cagayan Valley Lady Rising Suns	3	17	25	24	25	15	106	

3rd place

Date	Time	Teams	Set	1	2	3	4	5	Total	Report
Sep 16	16:00	Philippine Army Lady Troopers	2	21	25	22	25	15	108	
Sep 16	16:00	Ateneo Lady Eagles	3	25	19	25	18	13	100	
Sep 18	16:00	Philippine Army Lady Troopers	3	25	25	25			75	
Sep 18	16:00	Ateneo Lady Eagles	0	17	10	18			45	

Championship

Date	Time	Teams	Set	1	2	3	4	5	Total	Report
Sep 16	18:00	Sandugo-SSC-R	3	18	29	14	25	15	101	
Sep 16	18:00	Cagayan Valley Lady Rising Suns	2	25	27	25	13	7	97	
Sep 18	18:00	Sandugo-SSC-R	3	25	25	25			75	
Sep 18	18:00	Cagayan Valley Lady Rising Suns	0	18	22	16			56	

== Final standings ==
Rank	Team
1st place, gold medalist(s)	Sandugo-SSC-R
2nd place, silver medalist(s)	Cagayan-UPHD
3rd place, bronze medalist(s)	Philippine Army Lady Troopers
4	Ateneo Lady Eagles
5	Philippine Navy Lady Sailors
6	FEU Lady Tamaraws

== Awards ==
=== Individual awards ===
Award		Name
Most Valuable Player	Finals: Conference:	(Thailand) Jaroensri Bualee (Sandugo-SSC-R) (Philippines) Sandra Delos Santos (Cagayan)
Best Scorer		(Thailand) Jaroensri Bualee (Sandugo-SSC-R)
Best Attacker		(Philippines) Honey Royce Tubino (Cagayan)
Best Blocker		(Thailand) Utaiwan Kaensing (Sandugo-SSC-R)
Best Server		(Philippines) Joy Cases (Cagayan)
Best Setter		(Philippines) Tina Salak (Army)
Best Digger		(Philippines) Angelique Beatrice Dionela (Cagayan)
Best Receiver		(Philippines) Angela Nunag (Army)
