= Utaiwan Kaensing =

Thai volleyball player

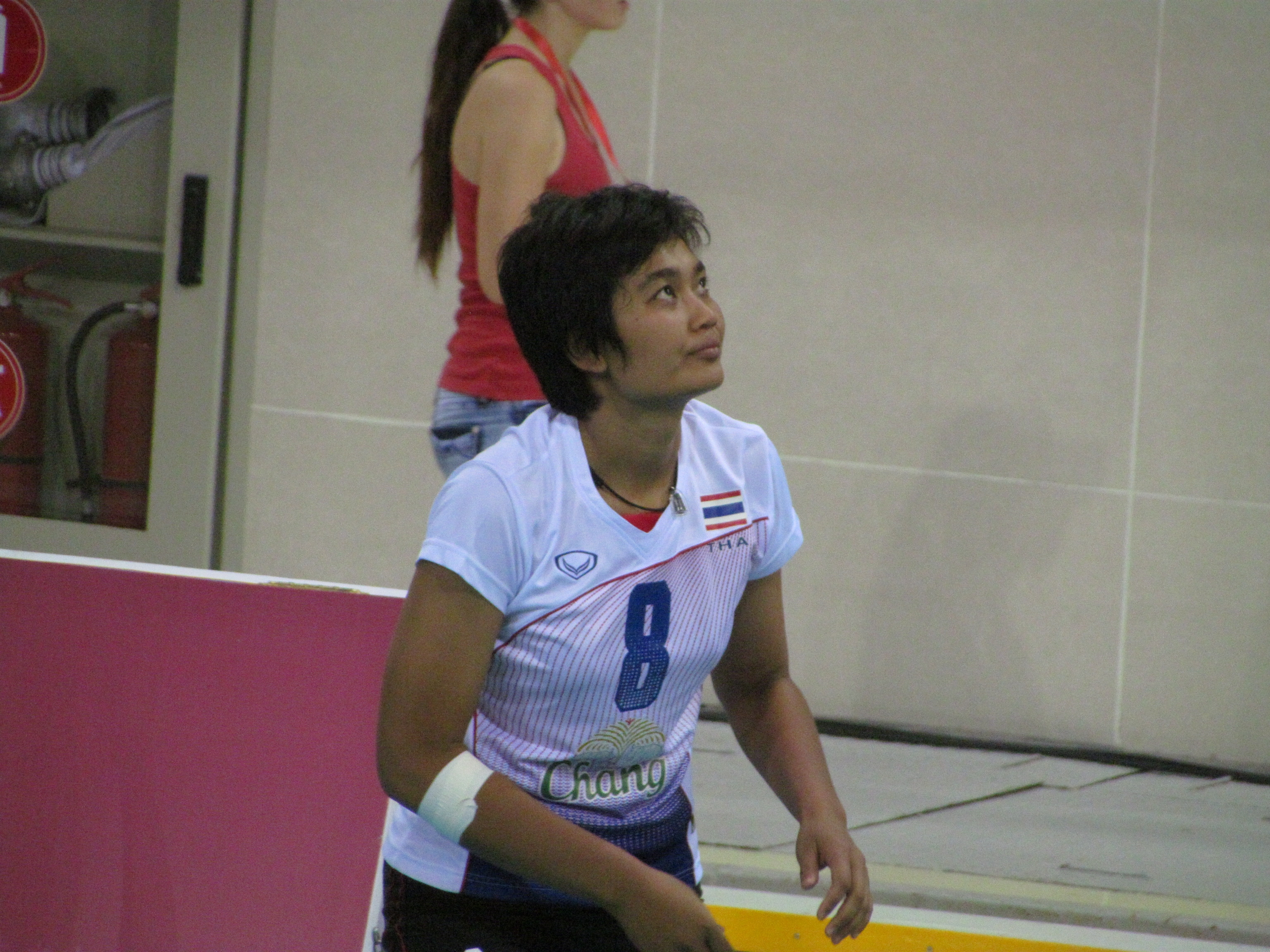

Personal information
- Full name: Utaiwan Kaensing
- Nickname: Nan
- Born: September 7, 1988 (age 38) Khon Kaen, Thailand
- Height: 1.89 m (6 ft 2 in)
- Weight: 86 kg (190 lb)
- Spike: 310 cm (122 in)
- Block: 295 cm (116 in)

Volleyball information
- Position: Middle Blocker
- Current club: Retired

National team
- Years: Team
- 2009–2011: Thailand
Honours
Women's volleyball
Representing Thailand
Asian Championship
Gold medal – first place	2009 Hanoi
Asian Cup
Silver medal – second place	2010 Taicang
Southeast Asian Games
Gold medal – first place	2009 Vientiane	Team
Gold medal – first place	2011 Jakarta/Palembang	Team

Utaiwan Kaensing (Thai: อุทัยวรรณ แก่นสิงห์; RTGS: Uthaiwan Kaensing) is a member of the Thailand women's national volleyball team.

== Clubs ==
- (Thailand) Idea Khonkaen (2008–2013)
- (Vietnam) VTV Bình Điền Long An (2008–2009)
- (Philippines) University of Santo Tomas (2011–2012)
- (Thailand) Suan Sunandha (2011–2012)
- (Thailand) Sisaket (2013–2015)
- (Thailand) Supreme Chonburi (2015–2016)

== Awards ==
=== Individual ===
- 2012 Shakey's V-League – "Best Blocker"
- 2012 Shakey's V-League 1st Conference – "Best Spiker"
