= 2015 Shakey's V-League Open Conference =

Shakey's V-League 12th Season Open Conference
Women's Finals	G1	G2	G3	Wins
PLDT Home Ultera	1	3	3	2
Philippine Army	3	1	2	1
- Duration: April 5, 2015 - May 31, 2015
- Arena(s): Filoil Flying V Arena, San Juan
- Finals MVP: Conference: Alyssa Valdez (PLDT); Finals: Jaja Santiago (PLDT)
- Winning coach: Roger Gorayeb (PLDT)
- Semifinalists: Cagayan Valley; Meralco
- TV network(s): GMA News TV (local); GMA Life TV (international)

The 2015 Shakey's V-League Open Conference was the 23rd conference of the Shakey's V-League and the first conference of the 2015 season. The opening ceremony was held on April 5, 2015 with the first triple header of volleyball games at the Filoil Flying V Arena in San Juan, Metro Manila. There were eight competing teams for this conference.

The PLDT Home Ultera Ultra Fast Hitters won its first Shakey's V-League championship, dethroning the defending champion, Philippine Army Lady Troopers, in three games.

== Tournament Format ==
=== Preliminaries (PL) ===
Single Round-robin. Top four teams qualified for the Semifinals.

=== Semi-finals (SF) ===
The four semi-finalists competed against each other in a single-round robin phase.

- Top two SF teams competed for gold.
- Bottom two SF teams competed for bronze.

=== Finals ===
The battles for gold and bronze followed the best-of-three format, provided:

- If the battle for gold ends in two matches (2-0), then there will no longer be a Game 3 for either gold or bronze. A tie in bronze (1-1) would be resolved using FIVB rules.
- A tie in the series for gold (1-1) after Game 2 would be broken in Game 3.

== Participating teams ==
Participating teams
Abbr.	Name	Abbr.	Name
CAG	Cagayan Valley Lady Rising Suns	BAG	Baguio Summer Spikers
FRB	Fourbees-Perpetual Help	MER	Meralco Power Spikers
PAR	Philippine Army Lady Troopers	PCG	Philippine Coast Guard Lady Dolphins
PNV	Philippine Navy Lady Sailors	PLD	PLDT Home Ultera Ultra Fast Hitters

== Preliminaries ==
Pos	Team	Pld	W	L	Pts	SW	SL	SR	SPW	SPL	SPR	Qualification
1	PLDT Home Ultera Ultra Fast Hitters	7	7	0	20	21	3	7.000	586	442	1.326	Semifinals
2	Philippine Army Lady Troopers	7	6	1	18	18	4	4.500	539	364	1.481	Semifinals
3	Cagayan Valley Lady Rising Suns	7	5	2	14	16	8	2.000	557	433	1.286	Semifinals
4	Meralco Power Spikers	7	4	3	13	12	9	1.333	392	382	1.026	Semifinals
5	Philippine Navy Lady Sailors	7	3	4	9	11	14	0.786	501	524	0.956	Eliminated
6	Fourbees-Perpetual Help	7	2	5	6	8	17	0.471	389	500	0.778	Eliminated
7	Baguio Summer Spikers	7	1	6	2	3	20	0.150	372	557	0.668	Eliminated
8	Philippine Coast Guard Lady Dolphins	7	0	7	2	4	21	0.190	388	522	0.743	Eliminated

Date	Time		Score		Set 1	Set 2	Set 3	Set 4	Set 5	Total	Report
04/05	12:45	FRB	0–3	CAG	13-25	12-25	10-25			35–0	
04/05	14:45	PCG	0–3	PNV	24-26	14-25	18-25			56–0	
04/05	16:45	BAG	0–3	PLD	10-25	16-25	21-25			47–0	
04/07	14:00	PNV	0–3	MER	20-25	21-25	21-25			62–0	
04/07	16:00	PAR	3–0	FRB	25-8	25-10	25-11			75–0	
04/09	14:00	FRB	3–2	PCG	25-16	19-25	25-22	26-28	15-11	110–0	
04/09	16:00	CAG	3–0	BAG	25-11	25-9	25-11			75–0	
04/12	12:45	PAR	0–3	PLD	16-25	23-25	26-28			65–0	
04/12	14:45	BAG	0–3	MER	17-25	8-25	14-25			39–0	
04/14	14:00	PNV	0–3	PAR	19-25	12-25	15-25			46–0	
04/14	16:00	PLD	3–0	PCG	25-8	25-22	25-15			75–0	
04/16	14:00	PCG	2–3	BAG	27-25	18-25	25-21	23-25	12-15	105–0	
04/16	16:00	FRB	2–3	PNV	25-23	12-25	15-25	25-20	11-15	88–0	
04/19	12:45	CAG	1–3	PLD	20-25	22-25	28-26	18-25		88–0	
04/19	14:45	PAR	3–1	MER	24-26	25-17	25-20	25-22		99–0	
04/21	14:00	BAG	0–3	PAR	7-25	17-25	10-25			34–0	
04/21	16:00	PCG	0–3	CAG	17-25	10-25	19-25			46–0	
04/23	14:00	FRB	3–0	BAG	25-20	25-20	27-25			77–0	
04/23	16:00	PLD	3–0	PNV	25-14	25-22	25-14			75–0	
04/26	12:45	MER	2–3	PLD	23-25	25-23	25-19	12-25	11-15	96–0	
04/26	14:45	PNV	2–3	CAG	18-25	7-25	25-22	25-23	9-15	84–0	
04/28	14:00	PLD	3–0	FRB	25-20	25-17	25-13			75–0	
04/28	16:00	CAG	3–0	MER	25-21	25-19	25-21			75–0	
04/30	14:00	BAG	0–3	PNV	14-25	19-25	12-25			45–0	
04/30	16:00	PCG	0–3	PAR	8-25	13-25	12-25			33–0	
05/10	12:45	PAR	3–0	CAG	25-16	25-21	25-22			75–0	
05/10	14:45	FRB	0–3	MER	11-25	12-25	14-25			37–0	
05/12	16:00	MER	3–0	PCG	25-20	25-20	25-20			75–0	

== Semifinals ==
Pos	Team	Pld	W	L	Pts	SW	SL	SR	SPW	SPL	SPR
1	PLDT Home Ultera Ultra Fast Hitters	3	3	0	7	9	4	2.250	295	265	1.113
2	Philippine Army Lady Troopers	3	2	1	6	8	5	1.600	289	272	1.063
3	Cagayan Valley Lady Rising Suns	3	1	2	3	3	6	0.500	198	214	0.925
4	Meralco Power Spikers	3	0	3	2	4	9	0.444	259	290	0.893

Date	Time		Score		Set 1	Set 2	Set 3	Set 4	Set 5	Total	Report
05/14	12:00	PAR	3–2	MER	25-21	21-25	19-25	25-20	15-9	105–0	
05/14	14:00	PLD	3–0	CAG	25-22	25-14	25-23			75–0	
05/17	12:45	PLD	3–2	PAR	25-21	24-26	20-25	26-24	15-12	110–0	
05/17	14:45	CAG	3–0	MER	25-20	25-22	25-21			75–0	
05/19	14:00	CAG	0–3	PAR	23-25	24-26	17-25			64–0	
05/19	16:00	PLD	3–2	MER	22-25	25-14	20-25	25-16	18-16	110–0	

== Finals ==
=== Battle for Bronze ===
05/21/2015; 14:00	Meralco Power Spikers	0–3	Cagayan Valley Lady Rising Suns	Filoil Flying V Arena
05/21/2015; 14:00	(23–25, 21–25, 23–25)			Filoil Flying V Arena

05/24/2015; 09:45	Cagayan Valley Lady Rising Suns	3–1	Meralco Power Spikers	Filoil Flying V Arena
05/24/2015; 09:45	(25–14, 25–19, 20–25, 25–19)			Filoil Flying V Arena

=== Battle for Gold ===
05/21/2015; 16:00	PLDT Home Ultera Ultra Fast Hitters	1–3	Philippine Army Lady Troopers	Filoil Flying V Arena
05/21/2015; 16:00	(25–13, 23–25, 25–27, 22–25)			Filoil Flying V Arena

05/24/2015; 12:45	Philippine Army Lady Troopers	1–3	PLDT Home Ultera Ultra Fast Hitters	Filoil Flying V Arena
05/24/2015; 12:45	(16–25, 22–25, 25–19, 16–25)			Filoil Flying V Arena

05/31/2015; 12:45	Philippine Army Lady Troopers	2–3	PLDT Home Ultera Ultra Fast Hitters	Filoil Flying V Arena; Attendance: 5,425
05/31/2015; 12:45	(22–25, 25–18, 26–24, 26–28, 13–15)			Filoil Flying V Arena; Attendance: 5,425

== Final standings ==
Rank	Team
1st place, gold medalist(s)	PLDT Home Ultera Ultra Fast Hitters
2nd place, silver medalist(s)	Philippine Army Lady Troopers
3rd place, bronze medalist(s)	Cagayan Valley Lady Rising Suns
4	Meralco Power Spikers
5	Philippine Navy Lady Sailors
6	Fourbees-Perpetual Help
7	Baguio Summer Spikers
8	Philippine Coast Guard Lady Dolphins

Shakey's V-League 12th Season Open Conference
PLDT Home Ultera Ultra Fast Hitters

1st title

Team roster
Rubie de Leon, Alyssa Valdez, Suzanne Roces (c), Rysabelle Devanadera, Grethcel Soltones, Jaja Santiago, Lizlee Ann Gata-Pantone, Elaine Kasilag, Amanda Villanueva, Ma. Asuncion Mendiola, Louann Latigay, Jamenea Ferrer, Dennise Michelle Lazaro, Ma. Rosario Soriano
Head coach
Roger Gorayeb

== Individual awards ==
Award	Name
Finals MVP	Jaja Santiago
Conference MVP	Alyssa Valdez
1st Best Outside Spiker	Alyssa Valdez
2nd Best Outside Spiker	Rachel Daquis
1st Best Middle Blocker	Marivic Meneses
2nd Best Middle Blocker	Jaja Santiago
Best opposite spiker	Jovelyn Gonzaga
Best setter	Rubie de Leon
Best libero	Jennylyn Reyes

== Broadcast partners ==
- GMA News TV (local)
- GMA Life TV (international)

== See also ==
- Spikers' Turf 1st Season Open Conference
- 2015 PSL All-Filipino Conference
