= Cagayan Valley Lady Rising Suns =

Women's volleyball team in the Philippines

- Cagayan Valley Lady Rising Suns Official Logo
- Nickname: Lady Rising Suns
- Founded: 2011
- Dissolved: 2015
- Manager: Criselda Antonio
- Captain: Ma. Angeli Tabaquero (UST)
- League: Shakey's V-League
- 2015 Open: 3rd place
- Website: Club home page

Uniforms
| Home | Away |

Championships
- Shakey's V-League: 2 Cagayan Friendship Games: 2

The Cagayan Valley Lady Rising Suns were a women's volleyball team representing the Cagayan Valley region and were owned by the Antonio family of Cagayan. The team was established in 2011 and initially played in the Shakey's V-League (SVL). From 2013 to 2014, the team also competed in the newly-established Philippine Super Liga (PSL) before solely competing in the SVL until 2015.

The team won two championships and earned five podium finishes, all in the SVL.

== Team colors ==
- Main: Maroon
- 2nd: White
- 3rd: Yellow

== Notable records ==
- They are the first team in history to have an immaculate record of 16-0 (undefeated record) en route to the championship by winning the Shakey's V-League Season 10 Open Conference.

== Season-by-season records ==
=== Domestic league ===
==== Shakey's V-League (2012–2015) ====
| Season | Conference | Preliminary round | Playoffs | Ranking | Source |
| 2012 | Open | 3rd (7–3, 23 pts) | Won in semifinals vs. Philippine Army, 2–0 (Note: Best-of-three series.); Lost in championship vs. Sandugo–SSC–R, 0–2 | Runner-up | |
| 2013 | Open | 1st (7–0, 20 pts) | Finished 1st in quarterfinals (10–0, 26 pts) (Note: Round-robin tournament.); Won in semifinals vs. Philippine Air Force, 2–0; Won in championship vs. Smart–Maynilad, 2–0 | Champions | |
| 2014 | Open | 4th (4–3, 11 pts) | Finished 3rd in quarterfinals (5–5, 15 pts); Won in semifinals vs. PLDT, 2–0; Lost in championship vs. Philippine Army, 0–2 | Runner-up | |
| 2014 | Reinforced Open | 2nd (4–2, 14 pts) | Won in championship vs. Philippine Army, 2–0 | Champions | |
| 2015 | Open | 3rd (5–2, 14 pts) | Finished 3rd in semifinals (1–2, 3 pts) Won in third place series vs. Meralco, 2–0 | 3rd place | |

==== Philippine Super Liga (2013–2014) ====
| Season | Conference | Preliminary round | Playoffs | Ranking | Source |
| 2013 | Invitational | 4th (3–2, 7 pts) | Won in quarterfinals vs. PLDT, 3–0; Lost in semifinals vs. TMS–Philippine Army, 2–3 Lost in third place match vs. Petron, 1–3 | 4th place | |
| 2013 | Grand Prix | 3rd (3–2, 9 pts) | Won in quarterfinals vs. RC Cola, 3–1; Lost in semifinals vs. TMS–Philippine Army, 0–3 Lost in third place match vs. PLDT, 0–3 | 4th place | |
| 2014 | All-Filipino | 5th (2–4, 7 pts) | Lost in quarterfinals vs. AirAsia, 2–3 Lost in fifth place match vs. Petron, 0–3 | 6th place | |

=== Domestic competitions ===
==== Philippine National Games ====
| Year | Ranking | Source |
| 2013 | Runner-up | |
| 2014 | 3rd place | |

== Individual awards ==
=== Philippine Super Liga ===
| Season | Conference | Award | Name |
|---|---|---|---|
| 2013 | Invitational | Best Server | (Philippines) Sandra delos Santos |
| 2013 | Invitational | Best Digger | (Philippines) Angelique Dionela |
| 2013 | Grand Prix | 2nd Best Outside Spiker | (Thailand) Wanida Kotruang |

== See also ==
- Cagayan Rising Suns (men's basketball team)
- Cagayan Valley Rising Suns (men's volleyball team)
