= 2012 Shakey's V-League 1st Conference =

Shakey's V-League 9th Season 1st Conference
Women's Finals	G1	G2	G3	Wins
Ateneo Lady Eagles	1	3	3	2
UST Growling Tigresses	3	1	2	1
- Duration: June 3–10, 2012
- Arena(s): Filoil Flying V Arena, San Juan
- Finals MVP: Alyssa Valdez
- Winning coach: Roger Gorayeb
- Semifinalists: San Sebastian Lady Stags; Perpetual Lady Altas
- TV network(s): TV5 (AKTV on IBC-13), Hyper

The 2012 Shakey's V-League 1st Conference was the 16th conference of the Shakey's V-League and the first conference of the 2012 season. The opening ceremonies was held on April 24, 2012, with the first doubleheader of volleyball games at the Filoil Flying V Arena in San Juan. After a two-year hiatus, the Tigresses of the University of Santo Tomas, the winningest team of the league, participates the conference with other nine teams.

At the end of the elimination round, the Lady Eagles of the Ateneo de Manila University and the Tigresses of the University of Santo Tomas (UST) emerged on the top of standings in their respective group via complete sweep 4–0. Meanwhile, the SWU Lady Cobras of Group A and the Letran Lady Knights of Group B finish winless and bid their goodbye in the conference as both teams were eliminated for their hope to enter the quarterfinal round.

The Ateneo Lady Eagles had the distinction of sweeping the quarterfinals 8–0, capped by a win against UST Tigresses (3–1) on their last quarterfinal game. The UST Tigresses snagged a solo second spot after beating NU Lady Bulldogs in straight sets on the last day of quarterfinals. The San Sebastian Lady Stags and Perpetual Lady Altas ended the round third and fourth, respectively, and the former faced UST while the latter battled with Ateneo in the best-of-three series semifinals of the conference.

In semifinals, Ateneo swept UPHSD 2–0 to formalize their entry to the Finals. On the other side, San Sebastian forced a rubber match but UST won in three straight sets on the deciding game to face Ateneo in their first Finals meeting.

== Participants ==
The conference is composed of 10 teams, grouped into two pools, each consisting of five squads.

Participating teams
Pool A	Pool B
Ateneo de Manila University; Lady Eagles	Adamson University Lady Falcons
Far Eastern University; Lady Tamaraws	Colegio de San Juan de Letran Lady Knights
National University Lady Bulldogs	San Sebastian College–Recoletos Lady Stags
Southwestern University; Lady Cobras	University of St. La Salle; Lady Stingers
University of Perpetual Help System DALTA Lady Altas	University of Santo Tomas Tigresses

== Tournament format ==
The tournament format for first conference of Shakey's V-League ninth season are as follows:

- During elimination round, teams will only play against teams in their pool in a single round-robin schedule.
- At the end of the eliminations, the top four teams in each pool will advance to the quarterfinal round. The qualifiers for the quarterfinals will be grouped into one. Team standings during eliminations will be carried over into the quarterfinal round. Qualified teams of Pool A will only play against teams of the other pool, Pool B in a single round-robin schedule, and vice versa.
- The top four teams in quarterfinal standings will advance to the best-of-three series semifinal round. Seed #1 team meets #4, while #2 meets #3.
- Winners of the semifinals will battle in a best-of-three series Finals, while losers will play for a best-of-three series bronze medal game.

== Elimination round ==
- All times are local (UTC+8). All games were held at Filoil Flying V Arena, San Juan.

In the elimination round, each group played a round-robin schedule, with each team playing every other team. The top four teams advanced to the second round.

=== Group A ===
Group A featured Ateneo, FEU, NU, SWU, and UPHSD. Ateneo won all its matches, while SWU was eliminated after going 0–4.

Pos	Team	Pld	W	L	Pts	SW	SL	SR	SPW	SPL	SPR	Qualification
1	Ateneo Lady Eagles	4	4	0	8	12	2	6.000	340	254	1.339	Qualified to the quarterfinals
2	Perpetual Lady Altas	4	3	1	7	9	5	1.800	310	288	1.076	Qualified to the quarterfinals
3	FEU Lady Tamaraws	4	2	2	6	7	6	1.167	283	258	1.097	Qualified to the quarterfinals
4	NU Lady Bulldogs	4	1	3	5	6	10	0.600	326	364	0.896	Qualified to the quarterfinals
5	SWU Lady Cobras	4	0	4	4	1	12	0.083	225	320	0.703	

Rules for classification: 1) number of wins; 2) head-to-head record; 3) match points; 4) sets ratio; 5) points ratio

Date	Time		Score		Set 1	Set 2	Set 3	Set 4	Set 5	Total	Report
24 Apr	4 p.m.	Ateneo Lady Eagles	3–1	FEU Lady Tamaraws	25–17	25–18	19–25	25–15	—	94–75	94–75
26 Apr	2 p.m.	Perpetual Lady Altas	3–2	NU Lady Bulldogs	25–15	23–25	25–16	25–27	15–12	113–95	Report
29 Apr	2 p.m.	NU Lady Bulldogs	1–3	Ateneo Lady Eagles	15–25	24–26	25–20	14–25	—	78–96	78–96
01 May	2 p.m.	SWU Lady Cobras	0–3	FEU Lady Tamaraws	9–25	8–25	15–25	—	—	32–75	32–75
03 May	2 p.m.	NU Lady Bulldogs	3–1	SWU Lady Cobras	20–25	25–21	25–17	25–17	—	95–80	95–80
03 May	6 p.m.	Ateneo Lady Eagles	3–0	Perpetual Lady Altas	25–14	25–20	25–13	—	—	75–47	75–47
06 May	2 p.m.	FEU Lady Tamaraws	3–0	NU Lady Bulldogs	25–22	25–15	25–20	—	—	75–57	75–57
06 May	4 p.m.	SWU Lady Cobras	0–3	Ateneo Lady Eagles	16–25	19–25	19–25	—	—	54–75	54–75
08 May	2 p.m.	Perpetual Lady Altas	3–0	SWU Lady Cobras	25–14	25–23	25–22	—	—	75–59	75–59
10 May	2 p.m.	FEU Lady Tamaraws	0–3	Perpetual Lady Altas	22–25	19–25	20–25	—	—	61–75	61–75

=== Group B ===
Group B featured the league's winningest team, the UST, as well as Adamson, Letran, San Sebastian, and USLS. UST won all four of its matches. Letran was defeated in every match and was eliminated from the competition.

Pos	Team	Pld	W	L	Pts	SW	SL	SR	SPW	SPL	SPR	Qualification
1	UST Growling Tigresses	4	4	0	8	12	1	12.000	320	220	1.455	Qualified to the quarterfinals
2	San Sebastian Lady Stags	4	3	1	7	9	5	1.800	307	294	1.044	Qualified to the quarterfinals
3	Adamson Lady Falcons	4	2	2	6	8	9	0.889	366	371	0.987	Qualified to the quarterfinals
4	USLS Lady Stingers	4	1	3	5	6	11	0.545	336	378	0.889	Qualified to the quarterfinals
5	Letran Lady Knights	4	0	4	4	3	12	0.250	276	342	0.807	

Rules for classification: 1) number of wins; 2) head-to-head record; 3) match points; 4) sets ratio; 5) points ratio

Date	Time		Score		Set 1	Set 2	Set 3	Set 4	Set 5	Total	Report
24 Apr	2 p.m.	Letran Lady Knights	0–3	San Sebastian Lady Stags	24–26	12–25	18–25	—	—	54–76	54–76
26 Apr	4 p.m.	Letran Lady Knights	0–3	UST Growling Tigresses	10–25	22–25	13–25	—	—	45–75	45–75
26 Apr	6 p.m.	San Sebastian Lady Stags	3–1	Adamson Lady Falcons	18–25	25–16	25–20	25–21	—	93–82	93–82
29 Apr	4 p.m.	UST Growling Tigresses	3–1	Adamson Lady Falcons	20–25	25–17	25–19	25–22	—	95–83	95–83
01 May	4 p.m.	USLS Lady Stingers	1–3	San Sebastian Lady Stags	18–25	25–20	19–25	21–25	—	83–95	83–95
03 May	4 p.m.	Letran Lady Knights	2–3	USLS Lady Stingers	17–25	19–25	25–23	25–14	10–15	96–102	Report
06 May	6 p.m.	UST Growling Tigresses	3–0	USLS Lady Stingers	25–23	25–12	25–14	—	—	75–49	75–49
08 May	4 p.m.	USLS Lady Stingers	2–3	Adamson Lady Falcons	20–25	22–25	26–24	25–23	9–15	102–112	102–112
10 May	4 p.m.	Adamson Lady Falcons	3–1	Letran Lady Knights	25–18	25–16	14–25	25–22	—	89–81	89–81
10 May	6 p.m.	San Sebastian Lady Stags	0–3	UST Growling Tigresses	12–25	10–25	21–25	—	—	43–75	43–75

== Bracket ==
Quarterfinal		W	L
1	Ateneo	8	0
2	UST	7	1
3	San Sebastian	6	2
4	Perpetual	5	3
5	Adamson	3	5
6	USLS	3	5
7	NU	2	6
8	FEU	2	6

Semifinals
Ateneo	3	3
Perpetual	0	0
UST	3	2	3
San Sebastian	2	3	0

Final
Ateneo	1	3	3
UST	3	1	2
Bronze medal game
San Sebastian	3	3
Perpetual	2	1

== Quarterfinals ==
- All times are local (UTC+8). All games are held at Filoil Flying V Arena, San Juan.

In quarterfinals, the qualifiers are grouped into one. Team standings during eliminations will be carried over into the quarterfinal round. Qualified teams of Group A will only play against teams of the other pool, Group B, in a single round-robin schedule, and vice versa.

Pos	Team	Pld	W	L	Pts	SW	SL	SR	SPW	SPL	SPR	Qualification
1	Ateneo Lady Eagles	8	8	0	16	24	5	4.800	690	553	1.248	Qualified to the semifinals
2	UST Growling Tigresses	8	7	1	15	22	5	4.400	653	502	1.301	Qualified to the semifinals
3	San Sebastian Lady Stags	8	6	2	14	19	13	1.462	673	666	1.011	Qualified to the semifinals
4	Perpetual Lady Altas	8	5	3	13	17	13	1.308	651	638	1.020	Qualified to the semifinals
5	Adamson Lady Falcons	8	3	5	11 (Note: Head-to-head record: Adamson 1–0 USLS)	12	18	0.667	663	663	1.000	
6	USLS Lady Stingers	8	3	5	11	14	19	0.737	690	700	0.986	
7	NU Lady Bulldogs	8	2	6	10 (Note: Head-to-head record: NU 1–0 FEU)	12	19	0.632	559	603	0.927	
8	FEU Lady Tamaraws	8	2	6	10	10	18	0.556	540	614	0.879	

Rules for classification: 1) number of wins; 2) head-to-head record; 3) match points; 4) sets ratio; 5) points ratio
Notes:

Date	Time		Score		Set 1	Set 2	Set 3	Set 4	Set 5	Total	Report
May 13	2 p.m.	Adamson Lady Falcons	0–3	Perpetual Lady Altas	23–25	22–25	24–26	—	—	69–76	69–76
May 13	4 p.m.	USLS Lady Stingers	0–3	Ateneo Lady Eagles	16–25	22–25	22–25	—	—	60–75	60–75
May 13	6 p.m.	FEU Lady Tamaraws	1–3	UST Growling Tigresses	19–25	16–25	26–24	16–25	—	77–99	77–99
May 15	2 p.m.	NU Lady Bulldogs	2–3	USLS Lady Stingers	12–25	25–21	25–20	23–25	2–15	87–106	Report
May 15	4 p.m.	Adamson Lady Falcons	1–3	Ateneo Lady Eagles	22–25	14–25	25–20	22–25	—	83–95	83–95
May 17	2 p.m.	FEU Lady Tamaraws	0–3	USLS Lady Stingers	11–25	22–25	15–25	—	—	48–75	48–75
May 17	4 p.m.	Ateneo Lady Eagles	3–1	San Sebastian Lady Stags	25–11	23–25	25–17	25–19	—	98–72	98–72
May 17	6 p.m.	NU Lady Bulldogs	3–0	Adamson Lady Falcons	29–27	25–20	25–23	—	—	79–70	79–70
May 20	2 p.m.	Perpetual Lady Altas	3–2	USLS Lady Stingers	26–24	19–25	24–26	28–26	15–12	112–113	Report
May 20	4 p.m.	San Sebastian Lady Stags	3–2	FEU Lady Tamaraws	25–19	19–25	25–16	23–25	15–5	107–90	Report
May 20	6 p.m.	UST Growling Tigresses	1–3	Ateneo Lady Eagles	25–7	18–25	21–25	20–25	—	84–82	84–82
May 22	2 p.m.	NU Lady Bulldogs	1–3	San Sebastian Lady Stags	25–19	22–25	23–25	21–25	—	91–94	91–94
May 22	4 p.m.	UST Growling Tigresses	3–0	Perpetual Lady Altas	25–19	25–21	25–20	—	—	75–60	75–60
May 24	2 p.m.	Adamson Lady Falcons	3–0	FEU Lady Tamaraws	25–21	25–12	25–9	—	—	75–42	75–42
May 24	4 p.m.	UST Growling Tigresses	3–0	NU Lady Bulldogs	25–20	25–21	25–22	—	—	75–63	75–63
May 24	6 p.m.	San Sebastian Lady Stags	3–2	Perpetual Lady Altas	25–14	25–18	12–25	16–25	15–11	93–93	Report

== Semifinals ==
- All times are local (UTC+08:00).

=== Ateneo vs. UPHSD ===
May 27; 4:00 p.m.	Ateneo Lady Eagles	3–0	Perpetual Lady Altas	Filoil Flying V Arena, San Juan; Attendance: 673; Referees: Adrian Tabañag / Rolando Caillan
May 27; 4:00 p.m.	(31–29, 25–20, 25–19); Report Jorella Marie De Jesus (8 Attacks 1 Serve)^{Player of the Game (Ateneo)}			Filoil Flying V Arena, San Juan; Attendance: 673; Referees: Adrian Tabañag / Rolando Caillan

May 29; 2:00 p.m.	Ateneo Lady Eagles	3–0	Perpetual Lady Altas	Filoil Flying V Arena, San Juan; Attendance: 231; Referees: Philip Sison / Rodrigo Rojas
May 29; 2:00 p.m.	(25–23, 25–11, 25–23); Report Phee Nok Kesinee (11 Attacks 6 Blocks)^{Player of the Game (Ateneo)}			Filoil Flying V Arena, San Juan; Attendance: 231; Referees: Philip Sison / Rodrigo Rojas
May 29; 2:00 p.m.	Ateneo wins series, 2–0			Filoil Flying V Arena, San Juan; Attendance: 231; Referees: Philip Sison / Rodrigo Rojas

=== UST vs. San Sebastian ===
May 27; 2:00 p.m.	UST Growling Tigresses	3–2	San Sebastian Lady Stags	Filoil Flying V Arena, San Juan; Attendance: 421; Referees: Efren Gaa / Lumer Pajarillo
May 27; 2:00 p.m.	(25–11, 25–17, 23–25, 21–25, 15–8); Report Rhea Katrina Dimaculangan (44 Excellent Sets)^{Player of the Game (UST)}			Filoil Flying V Arena, San Juan; Attendance: 421; Referees: Efren Gaa / Lumer Pajarillo

May 29; 4:00 p.m.	UST Growling Tigresses	2–3	San Sebastian Lady Stags	Filoil Flying V Arena, San Juan; Attendance: 452; Referees: Lumer Pajarillo / Efren Gaa
May 29; 4:00 p.m.	(25–22, 27–29, 25–14, 23–25, 12–15); Report Jang Bualee (38 Attacks 1 Serve 1 Block)^{Player of the Game (San Sebastian)}			Filoil Flying V Arena, San Juan; Attendance: 452; Referees: Lumer Pajarillo / Efren Gaa

May 31; 4:00 p.m.	UST Growling Tigresses	3–0	San Sebastian Lady Stags	Filoil Flying V Arena, San Juan; Attendance: 435; Referees: Philip Sison / Adrian Tabañag
May 31; 4:00 p.m.	(25–12, 25–13, 25–23); Report Judy Caballejo (13 Attacks 1 Block)^{Player of the Game (UST)}			Filoil Flying V Arena, San Juan; Attendance: 435; Referees: Philip Sison / Adrian Tabañag
May 31; 4:00 p.m.	UST wins series, 2–1			Filoil Flying V Arena, San Juan; Attendance: 435; Referees: Philip Sison / Adrian Tabañag

== Bronze medal series ==
June 3; 2:00 p.m.	San Sebastian Lady Stags	3–2	Perpetual Lady Altas	Filoil Flying V Arena, San Juan; Attendance: 1,576; Referees: Efren Gaa / Lumer Pajarillo
June 3; 2:00 p.m.	(25–14, 25–23, 16–25, 32–34, 15–9); Report Jang Bualee (33 Attacks 1 Serve)^{Player of the Game (San Sebastian)}			Filoil Flying V Arena, San Juan; Attendance: 1,576; Referees: Efren Gaa / Lumer Pajarillo

June 5; 2:00 p.m.	San Sebastian Lady Stags	3–1	Perpetual Lady Altas	Filoil Flying V Arena, San Juan; Attendance: 1,427; Referees: Efren Gaa / Adrian Tabañag
June 5; 2:00 p.m.	(26–24, 25–17, 24–26, 25–23); Report Ruby De Leon (50 Excellent Sets)^{Player of the Game (San Sebastian)}			Filoil Flying V Arena, San Juan; Attendance: 1,427; Referees: Efren Gaa / Adrian Tabañag
June 5; 2:00 p.m.	San Sebastian wins series, 2–0			Filoil Flying V Arena, San Juan; Attendance: 1,427; Referees: Efren Gaa / Adrian Tabañag

== Finals ==
June 3; 4:00 p.m.	Ateneo Lady Eagles	1–3	UST Growling Tigresses	Filoil Flying V Arena, San Juan; Attendance: 2,123; Referees: Adrian Tabañag / Philip Sison
June 3; 4:00 p.m.	(25–16, 20–25, 22–25, 23–25); Report Mary Jean Balse (9 Attacks 2 Serves)^{Player of the Game (UST)}			Filoil Flying V Arena, San Juan; Attendance: 2,123; Referees: Adrian Tabañag / Philip Sison

June 5; 4:00 p.m.	Ateneo Lady Eagles	3–1	UST Growling Tigresses	Filoil Flying V Arena, San Juan; Attendance: 1,943; Referees: Philip Sison / Efren Gaa
June 5; 4:00 p.m.	(25–17, 22–25, 25–21, 28–26); Report Alyssa Valdez (22 Attacks 1 Block 8 Serves)^{Player of the Game (Ateneo)}			Filoil Flying V Arena, San Juan; Attendance: 1,943; Referees: Philip Sison / Efren Gaa

June 10; 4:00 p.m.	Ateneo Lady Eagles	3–2	UST Growling Tigresses	Filoil Flying V Arena, San Juan; Attendance: 4,823; Referees: Efren Gaa / Philip Sison
June 10; 4:00 p.m.	(25–19, 25–14, 17–25, 20–25, 15–13); Report Alyssa Valdez (19 Attacks 1 Block 2 Serves)^{MVP of the Finals (Ateneo)}			Filoil Flying V Arena, San Juan; Attendance: 4,823; Referees: Efren Gaa / Philip Sison
June 10; 4:00 p.m.	Ateneo wins series, 2–1			Filoil Flying V Arena, San Juan; Attendance: 4,823; Referees: Efren Gaa / Philip Sison

== Final standings ==
Rank	Team
1st place, gold medalist(s)	Ateneo de Manila University
2nd place, silver medalist(s)	University of Santo Tomas
3rd place, bronze medalist(s)	San Sebastian College–Recoletos
4	University of Perpetual Help System DALTA
5	Adamson University
6	University of St. La Salle
7	National University
8	Far Eastern University
9	Colegio de San Juan de Letran
10	Southwestern University

Shakey's V-League 9th Season 1st Conference Champions
Ateneo de Manila University
Second title, second consecutive title

Team roster
Bagatsing, Cainglet, de Jesus, Faustino, Ferrer, Gervacio, Ho,
Kesinee, Lazaro, Nacachi, Roces, Tajima, Tan, Valdez

Head coach
Gorayeb

== Individual awards ==
The Shakey's V-League awarded the outstanding players of the conference prior to Game 1 of the Finals of Shakey's V-League 9th Season 1st Conference at Filoil Flying V Arena in San Juan.

- Best scorer: Jaroensri Bualee, San Sebastian College – Recoletos de Manila
- Best attacker: Utaiwan Kaensing, University of Santo Tomas
- Best blocker: Lithawat Kesinee, Ateneo de Manila University
- Best server: Judy Caballejo, University of Santo Tomas
- Best digger: Angelique Beatrice Dionela, University of Perpetual Help System DALTA
- Best setter: Jamenea Ferrer, Ateneo de Manila University
- Best receiver: Dennise Michelle Lazaro, Ateneo de Manila University
- Most Improved Player: Sandra delos Santos, University of Perpetual Help System DALTA
- Most valuable player of the Conference: Jaroensri Bualee, San Sebastian College – Recoletos de Manila
- Most valuable player of the Finals: Alyssa Valdez, Ateneo de Manila University

== See also ==
- 2012 Filoil Flying V Preseason Hanes Cup
