= Philippine Army Lady Troopers =

Professional women's volleyball team of the Philippine Army

- Short name: Army
- Nickname: Lady Troopers
- League: Premier Volleyball League; Philippine Super Liga (2013-2018)
- 2024 PNVF: 5th place
- Championships: AFP-PNP Olympics: 1 (2015); Shakey's V-League: 2 (2011, 2014); Philippine Super Liga: 4 (2013, 2013, 2014, 2016)

Uniforms
Home	Away

The Philippine Army Lady Troopers represents the Philippine Army in women's volleyball competitions. The team previously competed in the Shakey's V-League/Premier Volleyball League as well as the Philippine Super Liga.

== History ==
The Lady Troopers were the first champion in the Philippine Superliga (PSL), winning all two conferences of the inaugural season. The team played in the PSL in partnership with various corporate sponsors. During the 2013 season, it was sponsored by TMS Ship Agencies, Inc. and played as TMS-Philippine Army Lady Troopers and in the 2014 All-Filipino, it partnered with Generika Drugstore and played as the Generika-Army Lady Troopers. After a three conference absence, the team returned to the PSL for the 2016 season in partnership with another PSL team, the RC Cola Raiders and played under their banner as the RC Cola-Army Troopers. After another hiatus in 2017, the team partnered with the Smart Prepaid Giga Hitters and played as the Smart-Army Giga Hitters in the Invitational Cup of the 2018 Philippine Super Liga season. After its move to the Premier Volleyball League in the 2019 season, the team partnered with PacificTown Property Ventures Inc. and played as PacificTown–Army Lady Troopers. Following the cancellation of its 2020 season, the team returned for the 2021 season as the Black Mamba Army Lady Troopers backed by the sponsorship from Corbridge Group and its Black Mamba Energy Drink beverage.

== Team colors ==
Philippine Army Lady Troopers

TMS-Philippine Army Lady Troopers (2013 Philippine Super Liga season)

Generika-Army Lady Troopers (2014 Philippine Super Liga All-Filipino Conference)

RC Cola-Army Troopers (2016 Philippine Super Liga season)

Smart-Army Giga Hitters (2018 Philippine Super Liga Invitational Cup)

PacificTown-Army Lady Troopers (2019 Premier Volleyball League season)

Black Mamba-Army Lady Troopers (2021 Premier Volleyball League Open Conference season)

Army-Black Mamba Energy Drink Lady Troopers (2022 Premier Volleyball League Invitational Conference)

United Auctioneers Army Lady Troopers (2022 Premier Volleyball League Reinforced Conference)

== Current roster ==
Philippine Army Lady Troopers
No.	Name	Position	Height	Weight	Spike	Block	Date of birth	School
2	(Philippines) Princess Bello	Outside Hitter						AU
4	(Philippines) Ayena Gwen Espiritu	Setter	1.62 m (5 ft 4 in)					MU
5	(Philippines) Mary Jean Balse–Pabayo	Middle Blocker	1.80 m (5 ft 11 in)	78 kg (172 lb)	259 cm (102 in)	258 cm (102 in)	May 31, 1983 (age 43)	UST
6	(Philippines) Jem Nicole Gutierrez	Outside Hitter	1.73 m (5 ft 8 in)	59 kg (130 lb)	269 cm (106 in)	263 cm (104 in)	March 21, 1996 (age 30)	UST
7	(Philippines) Sarah Jane Gonzales (C)	Setter	1.63 m (5 ft 4 in)	72 kg (159 lb)	248 cm (98 in)	241 cm (95 in)	May 8, 1991 (age 35)	UST
8	(Philippines) Jovelyn Gonzaga	Opposite Hitter	1.73 m (5 ft 8 in)	61 kg (134 lb)	273 cm (107 in)	274 cm (108 in)	October 31, 1991 (age 34)	CPU
9	(Philippines) Audrey Kathryn Paran	Outside Hitter	1.73 m (5 ft 8 in)	57 kg (126 lb)				NU
10	(Philippines) Anngela Nunag	Libero	1.60 m (5 ft 3 in)	64 kg (141 lb)	247 cm (97 in)	241 cm (95 in)	December 21, 1991 (age 34)	RTU
11	(Philippines) Alexa Polidario	Opposite Hitter						
12	(Philippines) Mary Antonette Landicho	Libero	1.62 m (5 ft 4 in)					NU
13	(Philippines) Jeannie Delos Reyes	Outside Hitter	1.78 m (5 ft 10 in)	65 kg (143 lb)	270 cm (110 in)	265 cm (104 in)	April 10, 1994 (age 32)	UST
14	(Philippines) Nerissa Bautista	Outside Hitter	1.78 m (5 ft 10 in)	77 kg (170 lb)	274 cm (108 in)	258 cm (102 in)	October 12, 1985 (age 40)	CPU
15	(Philippines) Honey Royse Tubino	Outside Hitter	1.74 m (5 ft 9 in)	71 kg (157 lb)	278 cm (109 in)	258 cm (102 in)	January 12, 1993 (age 33)	UPHSD
16	(Philippines) Lutgarda Malaluan	Middle Blocker	1.80 m (5 ft 11 in)	71 kg (157 lb)	278 cm (109 in)	258 cm (102 in)	January 12, 1993 (age 33)	SWU
18	(Philippines) Zairryl Sky Chavez	Opposite Hitter						
21	(Philippines) Jeanette Virginia Villareal	Opposite Hitter	1.72 m (5 ft 8 in)	58 kg (128 lb)	265 cm (104 in)	258 cm (102 in)	July 21, 1998 (age 28)	FEU

Head Coach

- Randy Fallorina

Assistant Coaches

- Patricia Siatan-Torres
- Patrick John Rojas

Team Manager

- Col. A. Divinagracia

Doctor

Physical Therapist

- Delos Reyes

Trainer

- A.P Tomas

== Honors ==
=== Team ===
Premier Volleyball League

Season	Conference	Title	Source
2017	did not compete -		
2018	did not compete -		
2019 (Note: played as PacificTown-Army.)	Reinforced	3rd place	
2019	Open	6th place	
2020	tournament cancelled due to COVID-19 pandemic		
2021 (Note: played as Black Mamba-Army.)	Open	6th place	
2022	Open	7th place	
2022	Invitational	5th place	
2022	Reinforced	9th place	
2023	1st All-Filipino	9th place	

Notes:

Shakey's V-League

Season	Conference	Title	Source
Season 8	Open	Champion	
Season 8	SEA Club Invitational	Runner-up	
Season 9	Open	3rd place	
Season 10	Open	3rd place	
Season 11	Open	Champion	
Season 11	Reinforced	Runner-up	
Season 12	Open	Runner-up	
Season 12	Reinforced	Runner-up	
Season 13	did not compete -		

Philippine Superliga:

Season	Conference	Title	Source
2013 (Note: played as TMS-Army.)	Invitational	Champion	
2013	Grand Prix	Champion	
2014 (Note: played as Generika-Army.)	All-Filipino	Champion	
2014	Grand Prix	did not compete -	
2015	All Filipino	did not compete -	
2015	Grand Prix	did not compete -	
2016 (Note: played as RC Cola-Army.)	Invitational	Champion	
2016	All-Filipino	3rd place	
2016	Grand Prix	4th place	
2017	Invitational	did not compete -	
2017	All-Filipino	did not compete -	
2017	Grand Prix	did not compete -	
2018 (Note: played as Smart-Army.)	Grand Prix	did not compete -	
2018	Invitational	4th place	
2018	All-Filipino	did not compete -	

Notes:

Others:

Year	Tournament	Title	Source
2015	AFP-PNP Olympics 2015	Champion	

PNVF Champions League:

Season	Title	Source
2024	5th place	

=== Individual ===
Premier Volleyball League

Season	Conference	Award	Name	Source
2019	Reinforced	Best Libero	(Philippines) Anngela Nunag	

Philippine Super Liga:

Season	Conference	Award	Name	Source
2013 (Note: played as TMS-Army.)	Invitational	Best Blocker	(Philippines) Tina Salak	
2013	Grand Prix	Most Valuable Player	(Thailand) Wanitchaya Luangtonglang	
2013	Grand Prix	Best Libero	(Japan) Yuki Murakoshi	
2014 (Note: played as Generika-Army.)	All-Filipino	Most Valuable Player	(Philippines) Tina Salak	
2014	All-Filipino	Best Middle Blocker	(Philippines) Mary Jean Balse	
2016 (Note: played as RC Cola-Army.)	Invitational	Most Valuable Player	(Philippines) Jovelyn Gonzaga	
2016	Invitational	2nd Best Outside Spiker	(Philippines) Honey Royse Tubino	
2016	All-Filipino	Best Opposite Spiker	(Philippines) Jovelyn Gonzaga	
2016	Grand Prix	1st Best Opposite Spiker	(Philippines) Jovelyn Gonzaga	

Notes:

Shakey's V-League:

Season	Conference	Award	Name	Source
Season 8	Open	Best Attacker	(Philippines) Marietta Carolino	
Season 8	Open	Best Receiver	(Philippines) Jennylyn Reyes	
Season 8	Open	Most Valuable Player (Finals)	(Philippines) Rachel Daquis	
Season 8	SEA Club Invitational	Best Server	(Philippines) Mary Jean Balse	
Season 9	Open	Best Setter	(Philippines) Tina Salak	
Season 9	Open	Best Receiver	(Philippines) Anngela Nunag	
Season 10	Open	Best Server	(Philippines) Mary Jean Balse	
Season 10	Open	Best Attacker	(Philippines) Jovelyn Gonzaga	
Season 10	Open	Most Valuable Player (Conference)	(Philippines) Jovelyn Gonzaga	
Season 10	Open	SOS Clear Skin In and Out of the Court	(Philippines) Rachel Daquis	
Season 11	Open	Best Server	(Philippines) Rachel Daquis	
Season 11	Open	Most Valuable Player (Conference)	(Philippines) Rachel Daquis	
Season 11	Open	Most Valuable Player (Finals)	(Philippines) Jovelyn Gonzaga	
Season 11	Reinforced	Best Attacker	(Philippines) Jovelyn Gonzaga	
Season 12	Open	2nd Best Outside Spiker	(Philippines) Rachel Daquis	
Season 12	Open	Best Opposite Spiker	(Philippines) Jovelyn Gonzaga	
Season 12	Reinforced	Most Valuable Player (Conference)	(Philippines) Jovelyn Gonzaga	
Season 12	Reinforced	Best Opposite Spiker	(Philippines) Jovelyn Gonzaga	
Season 12	Reinforced	1st Best Outside Spiker	(Philippines) Honey Royse Tubino	

== Team captains ==
- (Philippines) Melody Villaceran Guttierez (2011)
- (Philippines) Mayeth Carolino (2012)
- (Philippines) Joanne Bunag (2013)
- (Philippines) Tina Salak (2013, 2015, 2016)
- (Philippines) Ma. Theresa Iratay (2014, 2014)
- (Philippines) Michelle Carolino (2014)
- (Philippines) Jovelyn Gonzaga (2016, 2016, 2021, 2022)
- (Philippines) Mary Jean Balse-Pabayo (2018 - 2019)
- (Philippines) Honey Royse Tubino (2022)
- (Philippines) Anngela Nunag (2023)
- (Philippines) Sarah Jane Gonzales (2024–present)

== Imports ==
Premier Volleyball League:

Season	Number	Player
2019 (Note: played as PacificTown-Army.)	2	(Ukraine) Olena Lymareva-Flink
2019	7	(United States) Jenelle Jordan
2022	19	(Canada) Laura Condotta

Philippine Superliga:

Season	Number	Player
2013 (Note: played as TMS-Army.)	15	(Japan) Yuki Murakoshi
2013	16	(Thailand) Wanitchaya Luangtonglang
2016 (Note: played as RC Cola-Army.)	4	(United States) Hallie Ripley
2016	6	(United States) Kiera Holst

== Former players ==
Local players

Philippines

- Jennylyn Reyes
- Mayeth Carolino
- Joyce Palad
- Jessey Laine De Leon
- Genie Salas
- Patricia Siatan-Torres
- Dindin Santiago-Manabat
- Carmina Aganon
- Tina Salak
- Rachel Daquis
- Abigail Maraño
- Mary Remy Joy Palma
- Ma. Theresa Ilatay
- Jacqueline Alarca
- Joyce Palad
- Dahlia Cruz
- Christine Diane Francisco
- Caitlin Viray
- Alina Joyce Bicar
- Mary Dominique Pacres
- Mildred Thea Dizon
- Fenela Risha Emnas
- Javen Sabas
- Michelle Morente
- Aiko Sweet Urdas
- Necole Ebuen

Foreign players

Japan

- Yuki Murakoshi

Thailand

- Wanitchaya Luangtonglang

United States

- Kiera Holst
- Hallie Ripley
- Jenelle Jordan

Ukraine

- Olena Lymareva-Flink

Canada

- Laura Condotta

== See also ==
- Philippine Army Troopers
