= Shakey's V-League =

Philippine non-professional volleyball team

- Sport: Volleyball
- Founded: 2004
- Founder: Sports Vision
- First season: 2004
- Folded: 2016
- Replaced by: Premier Volleyball League
- Country: Philippines
- Venue: Filoil Flying V Arena Philsports Arena
- Last champions: Pocari Sweat (2nd title)
- Most titles: UST Tigresses (6 titles)
- Website: www.v-league.ph

The Shakey's V-League was a non-professional volleyball league in the Philippines established in 2004. It began as a women's collegiate league with teams coming from the University Athletic Association of the Philippines (UAAP), the National Collegiate Athletic Association (NCAA) and the Cebu Schools Athletic Foundation (CESAFI), among others. Corporate clubs and other non-collegiate teams began participation in 2011.

A men's division was included in its 21st conference (2014). It served as the precursor of the Spikers' Turf, the following year.

In December 2016, the league renamed itself and transitioned into the current professional entity — Premier Volleyball League, parting ways with its prime sponsor, Shakey's Pizza.

== History ==
=== Inception and early years (2004-2011) ===
The Shakey's V-League was established in 2004 by Sports Vision led by former Philippine Basketball Association commissioner Jun Bernardino, Ricky Palou, Moying Martelino and Rhea Navarro. The league was initially an inter-collegiate women's competition with participants from the UAAP, NCAA, and CESAFI. The SVL's founding was in cooperation with Shakey's Pizza (Philippines) serving as its title sponsor until 2016. Prior to the league's establishment, the sport was in a state of stagnation since the 1990s with the women's collegiate tournament of the Metro Manila-based UAAP at that point serving as the de facto highest tier of competitive volleyball in the country.

Every season originally spanned from April to November with the tournaments aptly named "First" and "Second Conference" until 2011 when the latter tourney was replaced by the "Open" and "Reinforced" tournaments

Among the unique rules implemented by the Shakey's V-League at the onset was allowing the collegiate teams to have maximum of two reinforcements - termed as "guest players" - on their roster. These guest players have ranged from alumni of participating schools, incoming college freshmen who use the tournament as preparation for the upcoming season of their mother leagues, and foreigners (among the few notables being the Thais Jaroensri Bualee, Patcharee Sangmuang, and Lithawat Kesinee).

In a few cases, participating schools had guest players who were alumni of another collegiate program to level the competitive field.

Prior to 2011, accommodating guest players for colleges were allowed in the two (or in a few instances, three) tournaments held during the year - they were henceforth limited to the league's First Conference held during the collegiate summer break every April to June as the Open or Reinforced Conferences accommodated semi-professional corporate squads until such format was succeeded by the "one foreign import" per team in 2016.

The UST Golden Tigresses won the inaugural V-League championship in 2004 defeating the DLSU Lady Archers. But DLSU won the next three conferences, defeating UST in both tourneys of Season 2 and the SSC-R Lady Stags in Season 3, sweeping both in the Finals of the three conferences.

The UST Tigresses returned to the league in 2007, after missing Season 3, winning both tournaments of Season 4 by defeating the SSC-R Lady Stags in both finals series.

Year 2008 saw the crowning of two other schools aside from UST and DLSU. Adamson University won the championship in Season 5's First Conference defeating the Ateneo Lady Eagles while San Sebastian College-Recoletos Lady Stags won the succeeding Second Conference by sweeping the two comebacking champion teams: DLSU Lady Archers in the semifinals and UST Tigresses in the finals.

However, the Tigresses made history via a "three-peat" winning their fourth, fifth and sixth championships by sweeping both tourneys of Season 6 by defeating SSC-R and Adamson, respectively in both championship series, and again winning the first conference of Season 7 by beating SSC-R for the fourth time in the finals. It was the battle for silver of the prior two conferences when Adamson University faced the Lady Stags of SSC-R in the finals of the 2nd Conference Season 7. Adamson won its second V-League crown after defeating San Sebastian 2–1 in their Finals series.

=== 2011-16: inclusion of corporate teams ===
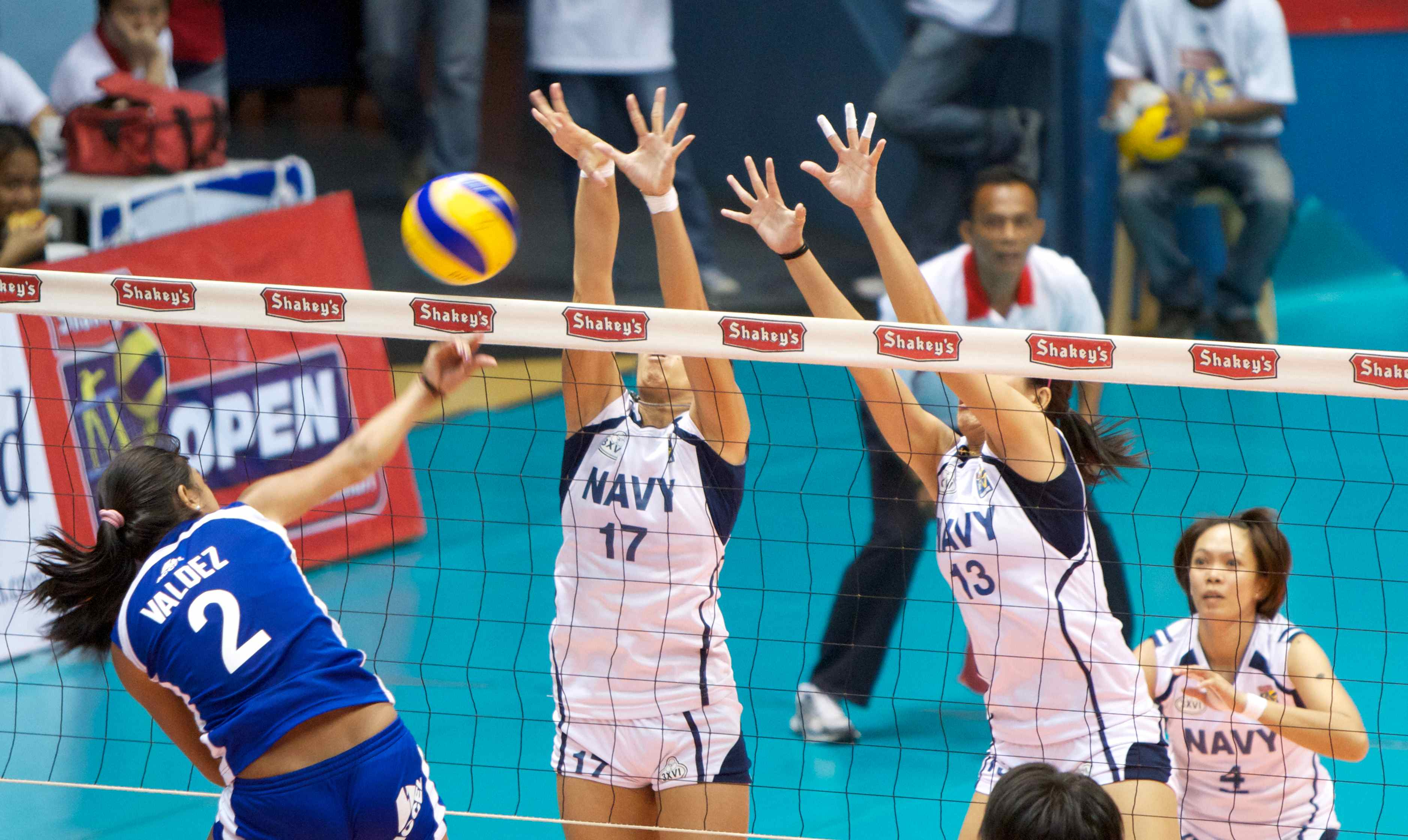
Philippine Navy vs. Ateneo de Manila University

The Shakey's V-League formally welcomed the participation of corporate and non-collegiate teams starting 2011.

The Ateneo Lady Eagles won their first Shakey's V-League crown by defeating defending champions Adamson in the Finals of Season 8's First Conference. The 2nd Conference for the year was renamed as the Shakey's V-League Open Conference as it was opened to semi-commercial teams with the addition of the Philippine Army, Philippine Navy, Philippine Air Force and Maynilad. The Philippine Army won their first Shakey's V-League championship. Season 8-Open Conference, Shakey's V-League also aired on GMA Life TV, GMA News TV and GMA Pinoy TV for international viewers.

Season 9 was locally aired by the AKTV block on IBC and the Hyper channel.

Beginning its 10th Season, Shakey's V-League's new broadcasting partner was GMA News TV. Matches were aired at 1 pm to 3 pm during weekdays, and 12:45 pm to 2:30 pm during Saturdays. On May 26, 2013, Shakey's V-League held its first live TV coverage via GMA News TV. It is also announced that the Game 3 matches, both for Championship and the Battle for 3rd will be aired live on GMA News TV on June 2, 2013. During the Season 10 Open Conference, Cagayan Valley made history as the Lady Rising Suns scored a tournament sweep, winning all matches from the elimination to the Finals en route to the team's first (and only) V-League title with a 2–0 series win over Smart-Maynilad Net Spikers.

On October 2, 2014, it was reported that a men's division will be included in its 21st conference with four teams.

On May 24, 2016, it was officially announced that Shakey's V-League will be aired on S+A following an agreement between Sports Vision, Shakey's and ABS-CBN Sports.

=== Rebrand to PVL (2016) ===
In December 2016, it was announced that starting the 14th season in 2017, Shakey's V-League will be renamed as the Premier Volleyball League (PVL). The season will start with the Reinforced Conference instead of the Open Conference in March 2017. The Spikers' Turf, a men's league spun-off from the league will be merged back into the PVL. Shakey's Pizza will remain as a presenter or major sponsor.

=== Return of the V-League (2022) ===
Due to the Premier Volleyball League's transition into a professional league, Sports Vision revived the V-League competition which collegiate teams can participate in 2022. With Shakey's not being the title sponsor in the new league, they would partner with Athletic Events and Sports Management Group Inc. (ACES), former owners of the Philippine Super Liga, to create the Shakey's Super League.

== Teams ==
See also: List of Shakey's V-League teams

=== Women's division ===
==== Collegiate ====
- Adamson Lady Falcons
- Arellano Lady Chiefs
- Ateneo Lady Eagles
- Benilde Lady Blazers
- FEU Lady Tamaraws
- De La Salle University-Dasmarinas Lady Patriots
- Letran Lady Knights
- Lyceum Lady Pirates
- De La Salle Lady Archers
- NU Lady Bulldogs
- PCU Lady Dolphins
- PUP Lady Radicals
- San Beda Lady Red Spikers
- San Sebastian Lady Stags
- Mapúa Lady Cardinals
- SWU Lady Cobras
- St. Louis University Lady Navigators
- TIP Lady Engineers
- University of Batangas Lady Brahmans
- Perpetual Lady Altas
- UE Lady Warriors
- University of San Carlos Lady Warriors
- USJ–R Lady Jaguars
- USLS Lady Stingers

==== Foreign guest teams ====
- Malaysia Club Team-MAS Club (Malaysia)
- Vietsovpetro (Vietnam)

==== Selection teams ====
- PSC Lady Legends
- Smart All-Stars
- Shakey's All-Stars
- Team Palaban All-Stars
- Team Puso All-Stars

==== Corporate and club ====
- Baguio Summer Spikers
- BaliPure Purest Water Defenders
- Bureau of Customs Transformers
- Davao Lady Agilas
- Iriga Lady Oragons
- Kia Forte
- Laoag Power Smashers
- PLDT Home Ultera Ultra Fast Hitters
- Maynilad Water Dragons
- Smart/Maynilad Net Spikers
- Philippine Air Force Jet Spikers
- Philippine Army Lady Troopers
- Philippine Coast Guard
- Philippine Navy Lady Sailors
- Philippine National Police Lady Patrollers
- Pocari Sweat Lady Warriors
- Sandugo/SSC-R Lady Conquerors
- Cagayan Valley Lady Rising Suns
- MERALCO Power Spikers
- Fourbees–Perpetual Help

=== Men's division ===
- Instituto Estetico Manila Volley Masters
- Systema Active Smashers
- Rizal Technological University Blue Thunder
- FEU Tamaraws

== Championship results ==
The UST Tigresses have the most number of championships (six), followed by the DLSU Lady Spikers & NU Lady Bulldogs (three). The Adamson Lady Falcons, Ateneo Lady Eagles, Philippine Army Lady Troopers, PLDT Home Ultera Ultra Fast Hitters, Cagayan Valley Lady Rising Suns and Pocari Sweat Lady Warriors have won two championships each. The San Sebastian Lady Stags, Vietsovpetro (VIE), Sandugo-San Sebastian, and FEU Lady Tamaraws each have one championship.

Season	Conference	Final			Third place match		
Season	Conference	Champions	Score	Runners-up	3rd place	Score	4th place
1 (2004–05)	1st (Details)	UST	3–1; 3–1	La Salle	LPU	3–?	San Sebastian
2 (2005–06)	1st (Details)	La Salle	3–2; 3–?	UST	Letran	3–?	PSC
2 (2005–06)	2nd (Details)	La Salle	3–1; 3–1	UST	San Sebastian	3–?	Ateneo
3 (2006)	1st (Details)	La Salle	3–0; 3–1	San Sebastian	Adamson	3–?	LPU
4 (2007)	1st (Details)	UST	3–0; 3–1	San Sebastian	LPU	3–0	La Salle
4 (2007)	2nd (Details)	UST	2–3; 3–0; 3–2	San Sebastian	Ateneo	3–1; 3–0	Adamson
5 (2008)	1st (Details)	Adamson	3–1; 3–0	Ateneo	San Sebastian	3–0; 3–0	LPU
5 (2008)	2nd (Details)	San Sebastian	3–0; 3–1	UST	La Salle	2–3; 3–1; 3–?	Adamson
6 (2009)	1st (Details)	UST	0–3; 3–0; 3–0	San Sebastian	Adamson	3–1; 3–0	FEU
6 (2009)	2nd (Details)	UST	3–1; 3–1	Adamson	FEU	3–2; 3–2	San Sebastian
7 (2010)	1st (Details)	UST	3–1; 2–3; 3–1	San Sebastian	Ateneo	3–2; 3–0	LPU
7 (2010)	2nd (Details)	Adamson	3–2; 1–3; 3–0	San Sebastian	LPU	3–0; 3–1	FEU
8 (2011)	1st (Details)	Ateneo	3–1; 3–2	Adamson	USLS	3–1; 3–0	NU
8 (2011)	Open (Details)	Philippine Army	3–0; 3–2	San Sebastian	Ateneo	3–2; 3–2	Philippine Navy
8 (2011)	SEA Club Invitational (Details)	Vietsovpetro (Vietnam)	3–2	Philippine Army	Malaysia Club (Malaysia)	3–0	Ateneo
9 (2012)	1st (Details)	Ateneo	1–3; 3–1; 3–2	UST	San Sebastian	3–2; 3–1	Perpetual
9 (2012)	Open (Details)	Sandugo San Sebastian	3–2; 3–0	Cagayan Valley–Perpetual	Philippine Army	2–3; 3–0; Army clinches 3rd by tiebreak	Ateneo
10 (2013)	1st (Details)	NU	0–3; 3–0; 3–1	Ateneo	UST	2–3; 3–1; 3–1	Adamson
10 (2013)	Open (Details)	Cagayan Valley	3–2; 3–2	Smart-Maynilad	Philippine Army	3–0; 3–1	Philippine Air Force
10 (2013)	All Star (Details)	Smart All Stars	3–2	Shakey's All Stars			
11 (2014)	1st (Details)	FEU	3–0; 3–0	NU	Adamson	3–1; 3–0	UST
11 (2014)	Open (Details)	Philippine Army	3–0; 3–0	Cagayan Valley	PLDT	1–3; 3–0; PLDT clinches 3rd by tiebreak	Philippine Air Force
11 (2014)	Reinforced Open (Details)	Cagayan Valley (W)	3–1; 3–2	Philippine Army	PLDT	3–2; 3–2	MERALCO
11 (2014)	Reinforced Open (Details)	IEM (M)	2–3; 3–2; 3–2	Systema	FEU	3–1; 0–3; 3–2	RTU
12 (2015)	Open (Details)	PLDT	1–3; 3–1; 3–2	Philippine Army	Cagayan Valley	3–0; 3–1	MERALCO
12 (2015)	Collegiate (Details)	NU	0–3; 3–0; 3–0	Ateneo	FEU	3–1; 3–0	UST
12 (2015)	Reinforced Open (Details)	PLDT	3–2; 3–1	Philippine Army	UP	3–1; 3–1	Philippine Navy
13 (2016)	Open (Details)	Pocari Sweat	2-3; 3-1; 3-1	Philippine Air Force	Bali Pure	3–2; 3–1	Laoag
13 (2016)	Collegiate (Details)	NU	3-2; 3-2	Ateneo	UP	2-3; 3-1; UP clinches 3rd by tiebreak	FEU
13 (2016)	Reinforced Open (Details)	Pocari Sweat	3-0; 3-1	Bureau of Customs	BaliPure	3-1; 3-0	UST
13 (2016)	All Stars (Details )	Team Palaban	3-1	Team Puso			
14 (2022)	view V-League (Philippines)						

== Awardees ==
Below is the table for the most awarded players in the league's history (2004–2016):

Rank	Name	Position	Years playing in SVL		MVP Award	Positional Award	Total
Rank	Name	Position	From	To	MVP Award	Positional Award	Total
1	(Thailand) Jaroensri Boalee (G)	OH	2007	2013	3	8	11
1	(Philippines) Alyssa Valdez	OH	2011	2016	5	6	11
3	(Philippines) Mary Jean Balse-Pabayo	MB	2008	2016	3	7	10
4	(Philippines) Aiza Maizo-Pontillas	OPP	2007	2015	5	4	9
4	(Philippines) Lizlee Ann Gata-Pantone	L	2007	2013	-	9	9
6	(Philippines) Jovelyn Gonzaga	OPP	2013	2015	3	5	8
7	(Philippines) Jaja Santiago	MB	2014	2016	2	5	7
8	(Philippines) Rachel Anne Daquis	OH	2010	2015	3	3	6
8	(Philippines) Margarita Pepito	L	2006	2009	-	6	6
8	(Philippines) Rubie De Leon	S	2013	2016	1	5	6

== Playing venues ==
The Lyceum of the Philippines University gymnasium in Intramuros, the Blue Eagle Gym, and the Rizal Memorial Coliseum served as the first rotating venues of the SVL due to the sport still being considered niche by that point, with audiences primarily being the players' relatives and physical education students.

This changed by 2009, as all league games began to be held at the Filoil Flying V Arena as fan bases for the sport grew. In 2013, the semi-final to championship rounds of season 10 were moved to the Mall of Asia Arena in Pasay and the PhilSports Arena in Pasig to accommodate larger crowds. Prior to the SVL's transition into the current PVL, elimination games were held at the FilOil Flying V Arena while the semifinals to the championships were permanently moved to the MOA Arena

== Broadcast partners ==
Similar to the current structure being done by the Maharlika Pilipinas Basketball League, Shakey's V-League utilized an in-house broadcast panel until 2016 to cover the games. Current PBA radio anchor and public address barker Noel Zarate and Sev Sarmenta originally served as the longtime play-by-play commentators with Mozzy Ravena, Noreen Go and Ivy Remulla, among others providing color commentary. Miriam College alumna and volleyball coach Maria Aurora "Mac" Gepuela serves as the SVL's main in-venue public address announcer. Upon ABS-CBN Sports' gaining of the league's broadcast rights in 2016, Anton Roxas, Boom Gonzales and the network's in-house personnel replaced Zarate and Sarmenta. Gepuela remained as the public address announcer.

IBC served as the inaugural partner for 2004–05 season before moving to ABC (now TV5) for 2005–06 season. NBN (now PTV) took over from 2007–2011 season and later returned to IBC (under AKTV's sports primetime block) in 2012 with a concurrent satellite TV coverage through Cignal TV's Hyper. GMA News TV (2013–2015) served as the first time as GMA's aired first professional volleyball league in the Philippines and last partner of Sports Vision's in house broadcast panel before ABS-CBN Sports took over in 2016 through Channel 23.

For overseas viewers, GMA Life TV, GMA Pinoy TV and GMA News TV International carried the games before transferring to S+A International in 2016.

Local

- IBC (2004–2005)
- ABC (2005–2006)
- NBN (2007–2011)
- AKTV on IBC and Hyper (2012)
- GMA News TV (2013–2015)
- S+A (2016)
  - S+A HD (2016)

International

- GMA Life TV (2011–2015)
- GMA Pinoy TV (2011–2015)
- GMA News TV International (2011–2015)
- S+A International (2016)

== See also ==
- Premier Volleyball League
- Spikers' Turf
- V-League (Philippines)
- Philippine Super Liga
