= List of Shakey's V-League award recipients =

The following is a list of award recipients of the former Shakey's V-League, a collegiate women's volleyball league in the Philippines founded in 2004. Starting season 12, a new format for special awards was given. Following the format currently using by the FIVB.

Award recipients' nationality is indicated in Awardees column; while Team column refers to the team where the awardee played for at the time of receiving the award. Names in boldface denote players from conference champion team.

== Most Valuable Player ==
Season	Conference	Division	Awardees				Ref.
Season	Conference	Division	Conference	Team	Finals	Team	Ref.
1	1st	-	(Philippines) Ging Balse	UST	Not awarded		
2	1st	-	(Philippines) Michelle Carolino	La Salle	Not awarded		
2	2nd	-	(Philippines) Maureen Penetrante	La Salle	Not awarded		
3	1st	-	(Philippines) Cherry Rose Macatangay	Adamson			
4	1st	-	(Thailand) Jaroensri Bualee	San Sebastian	(Philippines) Ging Balse	UST	
4	2nd	-	(Thailand) Lithawat Kesinee	Ateneo	(Philippines) Venus Bernal	UST	
5	1st	-	(Philippines) Nerissa Bautista	Adamson	(Philippines) Rissa Jane Laguilles	Adamson	
5	2nd	-	(Philippines) Laurence Anne Latigay	San Sebastian	(Philippines) Suzanne Roces	San Sebastian	
6	1st	-	(Philippines) Ging Balse	UST	(Philippines) Rhea Dimaculangan	UST	
6	2nd	-	(Philippines) Aiza Maizo	UST	(Philippines) Aiza Maizo	UST	
7	1st	-	(Philippines) Suzanne Roces	San Sebastian	(Philippines) Aiza Maizo	UST	
7	2nd	-	(Philippines) Suzanne Roces	San Sebastian	(Philippines) Nerissa Bautista	Adamson	
8	1st	-	(Thailand) Lithawat Kesinee	Ateneo	(Philippines) Jem Ferrer	Ateneo	
8	Open	-	(United States) Lauren Ford	San Sebastian	(Philippines) Rachel Daquis	Philippine Army	
8	SEA Club Invitational	-	(Russia) Ekaterina Martynova	(Vietnam) Vietsovpetro	Not awarded		
9	1st	-	(Thailand) Jaroensri Bualee	San Sebastian	(Philippines) Alyssa Valdez	Ateneo	
9	2nd	-	(Philippines) Sandra Delos Santos	Cagayan Valley Lady Rising Suns	(Thailand) Jaroensri Bualee	Sandugo-SSCR	
10	1st	-	(Philippines) Dindin Santiago	NU	(Philippines) Rubie De Leon	NU	
10	2nd	-	(Philippines) Jovelyn Gonzaga	Philippine Army	(Thailand) Phomla Soraya	Cagayan Valley Lady Rising Suns	
11	1st	-	(Philippines) Dindin Santiago	NU	(Philippines) Rachel Daquis	FEU	
11	All-Filipino Open	-	(Philippines) Rachel Daquis	Philippine Army	(Philippines) Jovelyn Gonzaga	Philippine Army	
11	Reinforced Open	Women's	(Philippines) Aiza Maizo - Pontillas	Cagayan Valley Lady Rising Suns	(Philippines) Aiza Maizo - Pontillas	Cagayan Valley Lady Rising Suns	
11	Reinforced Open	Men's	(Philippines) Jeffrey Jimenez	Instituto Estetico Manila Phoenix Volley Masters	(Philippines) Jeffrey Jimenez	Instituto Estetico Manila Phoenix Volley Masters	
12	Open	-	(Philippines) Alyssa Valdez	PLDT Home Telpad Turbo Boosters	(Philippines) Jaja Santiago	PLDT Home Telpad Turbo Boosters	
12	Collegiate	-	(Philippines) Alyssa Valdez	Ateneo	(Philippines) Myla Pablo	NU	
12	Reinforced	-	(Philippines) Jovelyn Gonzaga	Philippine Army	(Philippines) Alyssa Valdez	PLDT Home Ultera Ultra Fast Hitters	
13	Open	-	(Philippines) Grethcel Soltones	BaliPure	(Philippines) Myla Pablo	Pocari Sweat Lady Warriors	
13	Collegiate	-	(Philippines) Jaja Santiago	NU	(Philippines) Jasmine Nabor	NU	
13	Reinforced	-	(Philippines) Alyssa Valdez	Bureau of Customs Transformers	(Philippines) Michele Gumabao	Pocari Sweat Lady Warriors	

== Best Outside Attacker ==
Season	Conference	Place	Awardee	Team	Ref.
12	Open	1st	(Philippines) Alyssa Valdez	PLDT Home Ultera Ultra Fast Hitters	
12	Open	2nd	(Philippines) Rachel Daquis	Philippine Army Lady Troopers	
12	Collegiate	1st	(Philippines) Alyssa Valdez	Ateneo	
12	Collegiate	2nd	(Philippines) EJ Laure	UST	
12	Reinforced	1st	(Philippines) Royse Tubino	Philippine Army Lady Troopers	
12	Reinforced	2nd	(Philippines) Janine Marciano	PLDT Home Ultera Ultra Fast Hitters	
13	Open	1st	(Philippines) Alyssa Valdez	BaliPure	
13	Open	2nd	(Philippines) Myla Pablo	Pocari Sweat Lady Warriors	
13	Collegiate	1st	(Philippines) Isa Molde	UP	
13	Collegiate	2nd	(Philippines) Jorelle V. Singh	NU	
13	Reinforced	1st	(Philippines) Alyssa Valdez	Bureau of Customs Transformers	
13	Reinforced	2nd	(Philippines) EJ Laure	UST	

== Best Opposite Attacker ==
Season	Conference	Awardee	Team	Ref.
12	Open	(Philippines) Jovelyn Gonzaga	Philippine Army Lady Troopers	
12	Collegiate	(Philippines) Jovelyn Gonzaga	FEU	
12	Reinforced	(Philippines) Jovelyn Gonzaga	Philippine Army Lady Troopers	
13	Open	(Philippines) Michele Gumabao	Pocari Sweat Lady Warriors	
13	Collegiate	(Philippines) Toni Rose Basas	FEU	
13	Reinforced	(Philippines) Michele Gumabao	Pocari Sweat Lady Warriors	

== Best Setter ==
Season	Conference	Division	Awardee	Team	Ref.
1	1st	-	(Philippines) Chie Saet	La Salle	
2	1st	-	(Philippines) Chie Saet	La Salle	
2	2nd	-	(Philippines) Chie Saet	La Salle	
3	1st	-	(Philippines) Chie Saet	La Salle	
4	1st	-	(Philippines) Ma. Theresa Iratay	San Sebastian	
4	2nd	-	(Philippines) Charisse Ancheta	San Sebastian	
5	1st	-	(Philippines) Janet Serafica	Adamson	
5	2nd	-	(Philippines) Janet Serafica	Adamson	
6	1st	-	(Philippines) Rhea Dimaculangan	UST	
6	2nd	-	(Philippines) April Linor Jose	FEU	
7	1st	-	(Philippines) Jennelyn Belen	San Sebastian	
7	2nd	-	(Philippines) Nicolette Ann Tabafunda	Lyceum	
8	1st	-	(Philippines) May Jennifer Macatuno	Adamson	
8	Open	-	(Philippines) Jem Ferrer	Ateneo	
8	SEA Club Invitational	-	(Philippines) Jem Ferrer	Ateneo	
9	1st	-	(Philippines) Jem Ferrer	Ateneo	
9	2nd	-	(Philippines) Tina Salak	Philippine Army	
10	1st	-	(Philippines) Rubie De Leon	NU	
10	2nd	-	(Thailand) Phomla Soraya	Cagayan Valley Lady Rising Suns	
11	1st	-	(Philippines) Yna Louise Papa	FEU	
11	All-Filipino Open	-	(Philippines) Rhea Dimaculangan	Philippine Air Force	
11	Reinforced Open	Women's	(Philippines) Rubie de Leon	PLDT Home Telpad Turbo Boosters	
11	Reinforced Open	Men's	(Philippines) Renz Ordoñez	Instituto Estetico Manila	
12	Open	-	(Philippines) Rubie de Leon	PLDT Home Telpad Turbo Boosters	
12	Collegiate	-	(Philippines) Ma. Gizelle Jessica Tan	Ateneo	
12	Reinforced	-	(Philippines) Janet Serafica	Philippine Navy Lady Sailors	
13	Open	-	(Philippines) Wendy Ann Semana	Philippine Air Force	
13	Collegiate	-	(Philippines) Jia Morado	Ateneo	
13	Reinforced	-	(Philippines) Iris Janelle Tolenada	Pocari Sweat	

== Best Middle Blocker ==
Season	Conference	Place	Awardee	Team	Ref.
12	Open	1st	(Philippines) Ria Meneses	Cagayan Valley Lady Rising Suns	
12	Open	2nd	(Philippines) Jaja Santiago	PLDT Home Ultera Ultra Fast Hitters	
12	Collegiate	1st	(Philippines) Jaja Santiago	NU	
12	Collegiate	2nd	(Philippines) Bea de Leon	Ateneo	
12	Reinforced	1st	(Philippines) Kathy Bersola	UP	
12	Reinforced	2nd	(Philippines) Sheena Mae Chopitea	UP	
13	Open	1st	(Philippines) Jaja Santiago	NU	
13	Open	2nd	(Philippines) Kathy Bersola	UP	
13	Collegiate	1st	(Philippines) Jaja Santiago	NU	
13	Collegiate	2nd	(Philippines) Mary Remy Joy Palma	FEU	
13	Reinforced	1st	(Philippines) Ria Meneses	UST	
13	Reinforced	2nd	(Philippines) Lilet Mabbayad	Bureau of Customs Transformers	

== Best Libero ==
Season	Conference	Awardee	Team	Ref.
12	Open	(Philippines) Jennylyn Reyes	Meralco Power Spikers	
12	Collegiate	(Philippines) Fatima Bia General	NU	
12	Reinforced	(Philippines) Tatan Gata	PLDT Home Ultera Ultra Fast Hitters	
13	Open	(Philippines) Melissa Gohing	Pocari Sweat	
13	Collegiate	(Philippines) Ma. Gizelle Jessica Tan	Ateneo	
13	Reinforced	(Philippines) Denden Lazaro	BaliPure	

== Best Foreign Guest Player ==
Season	Conference	Awardee	Team	Ref.
13	Reinforced	(United States) Breanna Mackie	Pocari Sweat	

== Most Improved Player ==
Season	Conference	Awardee	Team	Ref.
1	1st	Not awarded		
2	1st	Not awarded		
2	2nd	Not awarded		
3	1st	(Philippines) Manilla Santos	La Salle	
4	1st	Not awarded		
4	2nd	(Philippines) Janet Serafica	Adamson	
5	1st	(Philippines) Ma. Rosario Soriano	Ateneo	
5	2nd	Not awarded		
6	1st	(Philippines) Shaira Gonzalez	FEU	
6	2nd	Not awarded		
7	1st	(Philippines) Analyn Joy Benito	San Sebastian	
7	2nd	Not awarded		
8	1st	(Philippines) Fille Saint Merced Cainglet	Ateneo	
8	Open	Not awarded		
8	SEA Club Invitational	Not awarded		
9	1st	(Philippines) Sandra Delos Santos	Perpetual	
9	2nd	Not awarded		
10	1st	(Philippines) Pamela Tricia Lastimosa	UST	
10	2nd	Not awarded		
11	1st	(Philippines) Bang Pineda	Adamson	

== Defunct Awards ==
=== Best Scorer ===
Season	Conference	Division	Awardee	Team	Ref.
1	1st	-	(Philippines) Angela Descalsota	San Sebastian	
2	1st	-	(Philippines) Cherry Rose Macatangay	Letran	
2	2nd	-	(Philippines) Cherry Rose Macatangay	San Sebastian	
3	1st	-	(Philippines) Cherry Rose Macatangay	Adamson	
4	1st	-	(Thailand) Jaroensri Bualee	San Sebastian	
4	2nd	-	(Thailand) Lithawat Kesinee	Ateneo	
5	1st	-	(Philippines) Beverly Boto	Lyceum	
5	2nd	-	(Philippines) Laurence Anne Latigay	San Sebastian	
6	1st	-	(Thailand) Jaroensri Bualee	San Sebastian	
6	2nd	-	(Philippines) Angela Benting	Adamson	
7	1st	-	(Thailand) Jaroensri Bualee	San Sebastian	
7	2nd	-	(Thailand) Jaroensri Bualee	San Sebastian	
8	1st	-	(Philippines) Patty Jane Orendain	USLS	
8	Open	-	(United States) Lauren Ford	San Sebastian	
8	SEA Club Invitational	-	(Russia) Ekaterina Martynova	(Vietnam) Vietsovpetro	
9	1st	-	(Thailand) Jaroensri Bualee	San Sebastian	
9	2nd	-	(Thailand) **Jaroensri Bualee**	Sandugo-SSCR	
10	1st	-	(Philippines) **Dindin Santiago**	NU	
10	2nd	-	(Thailand) **Kannika Thipachot**	Cagayan Valley Lady Rising Suns	
11	1st	-	(Philippines) EJ Laure	UST	
11	All-Filipino Open	-	(Philippines) Alyssa Valdez	Ateneo	
11	Reinforced Open	Women's	(Philippines) **Aiza Maizo - Pontillas**	Cagayan Valley Lady Rising Suns	
11	Reinforced Open	Men's	(Philippines) Salvador Depante	Systema Active Smashers	

=== Best Attacker ===
Season	Conference	Division	Awardee	Team	Ref.
1	1st	-	(Philippines) Angelica Bigcas	Lyceum	
2	1st	-	(Philippines) Roxanne Pimentel	UST	
2	2nd	-	(Philippines) Roxanne Pimentel	UST	
3	1st	-	(Philippines) Desiree Hernandez	La Salle	
4	1st	-	(Philippines) Ging Balse	UST	
4	2nd	-	(Thailand) Jaroensri Bualee	San Sebastian	
5	1st	-	(Thailand) Jaroensri Bualee	San Sebastian	
5	2nd	-	(Philippines) Rysabelle Devanadera	San Sebastian	
6	1st	-	(Philippines) Laurence Anne Latigay	San Sebastian	
6	2nd	-	(Philippines) Giza Yumang	Benilde	
7	1st	-	(Philippines) Aiza Maizo	UST	
7	2nd	-	(Philippines) Ging Balse	Lyceum	
8	1st	-	(Philippines) Nerissa Bautista	Adamson	
8	Open	-	(Philippines) Marietta Carolino	Philippine Army	
8	SEA Club Invitational	-	(Russia) Anactaxia Trernai	(Vietnam) Vietsovpetro	
9	1st	-	(Thailand) Utaiwan Kaensing	UST	
9	2nd	-	(Philippines) Honey Royce Tubino	Cagayan Valley	
10	1st	-	(Philippines) Myla Pablo	NU	
10	2nd	-	(Philippines) Jovelyn Gonzaga	Philippine Army	
11	1st	-	(Philippines) Pau Soriano	Adamson	
11	All-Filipino Open	-	(Philippines) Jaja Santiago	NU	
11	Reinforced Open	Women's	(Philippines) Jovelyn Gonzaga	Philippine Army	
11	Reinforced Open	Men's	(Philippines) **Jeffrey Jimenez**	Instituto Estetico Manila	

=== Best Server ===
Season	Conference	Division	Awardee	Team	Ref.
1	1st	-	(Philippines) Joyce Pano	UST	
2	1st	-	(Philippines) Rubie de Leon	UST	
2	2nd	-	(Philippines) Ging Balse	UST	
3	1st	-	(Philippines) Concepcion Legaspi	Lyceum	
4	1st	-	(Philippines) Karla Bello	Ateneo	
4	2nd	-	(Philippines) Jacqueline Alarca	La Salle	
5	1st	-	(Philippines) Angela Benting	Adamson	
5	2nd	-	(Philippines) Aiza Maizo	UST	
6	1st	-	(Philippines) Mecaila Irish Mae Morada	FEU	
6	2nd	-	(Philippines) Cherry Mae Vivas	FEU	
7	1st	-	(Philippines) Nicolette Ann Tabafunda	Lyceum	
7	2nd	-	(Philippines) Rachel Daquis	FEU	
8	1st	-	(Philippines) April Hingpit	USLS	
8	Open	-	(Philippines) Rubie De Leon	San Sebastian	
8	SEA Club Invitational	-	(Philippines) Ging Balse	Philippine Army	
9	1st	-	(Philippines) Judy Caballejo	UST	
9	2nd	-	(Philippines) Joy Cases	Cagayan Valley Lady Rising Suns	
10	1st	-	(Philippines) Alyssa Valdez	Ateneo	
10	2nd	-	(Philippines) Ging Balse	Philippine Army	
11	1st	-	(Philippines) Dindin Santiago	NU	
11	All-Filipino Open	-	(Philippines) **Rachel Daquis**	Philippine Army	
11	Reinforced Open	Women's	(Philippines) **Chie Saet**	Cagayan Valley Lady Rising Suns	
11	Reinforced Open	Men's	(Philippines) Joshua Barrica	FEU	

=== Best Blocker ===
Season	Conference	Division	Awardee	Team	Ref.
1	1st	-	(Philippines) Maureen Penetrante	La Salle	
2	1st	-	(Philippines) Maureen Penetrante	La Salle	
2	2nd	-	(Philippines) Michelle Laborte	Ateneo	
3	1st	-	(Philippines) Michelle Laborte	Ateneo	
4	1st	-	(Philippines) Michelle Laborte	Ateneo	
4	2nd	-	(Thailand) Lithawat Kesinee	Ateneo	
5	1st	-	(Philippines) Ma. Rosario Soriano	Ateneo	
5	2nd	-	(Philippines) Jacqueline Alarca	La Salle	
6	1st	-	(Philippines) Aiza Maizo	UST	
6	2nd	-	(Philippines) Ma. Paulina Soriano	Adamson	
7	1st	-	(Philippines) Nasella Nica Guliman	Lyceum	
7	2nd	-	(Philippines) Ma. Paulina Soriano	Adamson	
8	1st	-	(Philippines) Dindin Santiago	NU	
8	Open	-	(Philippines) Suzanne Roces	Sandugo-SSCR	
8	SEA Club Invitational	-	(Malaysia) Wong Fei Tien	Malaysia Club	
9	1st	-	(Thailand) Lithawat Kesinee	Ateneo	
9	2nd	-	(Thailand) Utaiwan Kaensing	Sandugo-SSCR	
10	1st	-	(Philippines) Maika Ortiz	UST	
10	2nd	-	(Philippines) Maureen Penetrante-Ouano	Meralco Power Spikers	
11	1st	-	(Philippines) Ria Meneses	UST	
11	All-Filipino Open	-	(Philippines) Maika Ortiz	Philippine Air Force	
11	Reinforced Open	Women's	(Philippines) Abigail Maraño	Meralco Power Spikers	
11	Reinforced Open	Men's	(Philippines) Rocky Hondrade	Systema Active Smashers	

=== Best Digger ===
Season	Conference	Division	Awardee	Team	Ref.
1	1st	-	(Philippines) Sharmaine Miles Peñano	La Salle	
2	1st	-	(Philippines) Sharmaine Miles Peñano'	La Salle	
2	2nd	-	(Philippines) Sharmaine Miles Peñano	La Salle	
3	1st	-	(Philippines) Margarita Pepito	San Sebastian	
4	1st	-	(Philippines) Mary Jane Pepito	San Sebastian	
4	2nd	-	(Philippines) Tatan Gata	Adamson	
5	1st	-	(Philippines) Tatan Gata	Adamson	
5	2nd	-	(Philippines) Tatan Gata	Adamson	
6	1st	-	(Philippines) Tatan Gata	Adamson	
6	2nd	-	(Philippines) Stephanie Gabriel	Ateneo	
7	1st	-	(Philippines) Tatan Gata	Adamson	
7	2nd	-	(Philippines) Angelica Vasquez	Adamson	
8	1st	-	(Philippines) Jennylyn Reyes	NU	
8	Open	-	(Philippines) Denise Michelle Lazaro	Ateneo	
8	SEA Club Invitational	-	(Philippines) Denise Michelle Lazaro	Ateneo	
9	1st	-	(Philippines) Angelique Beatrice Dionela	Perpetual	
9	2nd	-	(Philippines) Angelique Beatrice Dionela	Cagayan Valley Lady Rising Suns	
10	1st	-	(Thailand) Jaroensri Bualee	San Sebastian	
10	2nd	-	(Philippines) Melissa Gohing	Smart-Maynilad Net Spikers	
11	1st	-	(Philippines) Dancel Jan Dusaran	UST	
11	All-Filipino Open	-	(Philippines) Bang Pineda	Cagayan Valley Lady Rising Suns	
11	Reinforced Open	Women's	(Philippines) Tatan Gata-Pantone	PLDT Home Telpad Turbo Boosters	
11	Reinforced Open	Men's	(Philippines) Kenneth Bayking	RTU	

=== Best Receiver ===
Season	Conference	Division	Awardee	Team	Ref.
1	1st	-	(Philippines) Kate Co Yu Kang	UST	
2	1st	-	(Philippines) Ging Balse	UST	
2	2nd	-	(Philippines) Genelyn Alemania	FEU	
3	1st	-	(Philippines) Sharmaine Miles Peñano	La Salle	
4	1st	-	(Philippines) Sheila Marga	Lyceum	
4	2nd	-	(Philippines) Mary Jane Pepito	San Sebastian	
5	1st	-	(Philippines) Mary Jane Pepito	San Sebastian	
5	2nd	-	(Philippines) Mary Jane Pepito	San Sebastian	
6	1st	-	(Philippines) Margarita Pepito	San Sebastian	
6	2nd	-	(Philippines) Tatan Gata	Adamson	
7	1st	-	(Thailand) Porntip Santrong	Lyceum	
7	2nd	-	(Philippines) Angela Benting	Adamson	
8	1st	-	(Philippines) Denden Lazaro	**Ateneo**	
8	Open	-	(Philippines) Jennylyn Reyes	Philippine Army	
8	SEA Club Invitational	-	(Vietnam) Tuyen Bui Vu Tuhani	(Vietnam) Vietsovpetro	
9	1st	-	(Philippines) Denden Lazaro	**Ateneo**	
9	2nd	-	(Philippines) Anngela Nunag	Philippine Army	
10	1st	-	(Philippines) Jennylyn Reyes	NU	
10	2nd	-	(Philippines) Jennylyn Reyes	Meralco Power Spikers	
11	1st	-	(Philippines) Christine Agno	FEU	
11	All-Filipino Open	-	(Philippines) Tatan Gata	PLDT Home Telpad Turbo Boosters	
11	Reinforced Open	Women's	(Philippines) Bang Pineda	Cagayan Valley Lady Rising Suns	
11	Reinforced Open	Men's	(Philippines) Rikko Marmeto	FEU	

== See also ==
- List of Premier Volleyball League award recipients
- List of Spikers' Turf award recipients
