= Janine Marciano =

Filipina volleyball player

Personal information
- Full name: Janine Nicole L. Marciano
- Nationality: Filipino
- Born: January 9, 1992 (age 34)
- Hometown: Quezon City, Philippines
- Education: San Beda College

Volleyball information
- Position: Outside hitter
- Current club: Akari Chargers

National team
2015	Philippines (2015 VTV International Volleyball Cup) - LVPI

Janine Marciano is a Filipino volleyball player. She was a member of San Beda Red Lions women's University team in the NCAA.

== Volleyball career ==
In 2016, she transferred from BaliPure Purest Water Defenders to Cignal HD Spikers.

In 2022, she was signed again by the BaliPure Purest Water Defenders.

In August 2022, Marciano was signed by the new team Akari Chargers.

== Clubs ==
- PNP Lady Patrollers - (2013)
- Cagayan Valley Lady Rising Suns - (2014)
- PLDT Home Ultera Ultra Fast Hitters - (2015)
- BaliPure Purest Water Defenders - (2016, 2022)
- Cignal HD Spikers - (2017 - 2022)
- Akari Chargers - (2022–present)

== Awards ==
=== Individual ===
Season	Tournament	Award	Ref
2014	NCAA Season 89	Best Server	

=== Clubs ===
Season	Tournament	Club	Title	Ref
2014	Shakey's V-League 11th Season Open Conference	Cagayan Valley Lady Rising Suns	Runner-up	
2014	Shakey's V-League 11th Season Reinforced Open Conference	Cagayan Valley Lady Rising Suns	Champion	
2015	Shakey's V-League 12th Season Reinforced Open Conference	PLDT Home Ultera Ultra Fast Hitters	Champion	
2016	Shakey's V-League 13th Season Open Conference	BaliPure Purest Water Defenders	3rd Place	
2016	Shakey's V-League 13th Season Reinforced Open Conference	BaliPure Purest Water Defenders	3rd Place	
2017	2017 Philippine Super Liga Invitational Cup	Cignal HD Spikers	Champions	
2017	2017 Philippine Super Liga All-Filipino Conference	Cignal HD Spikers	3rd Place	
2018	2018 Philippine Super Liga Invitational Cup	Cignal HD Spikers	3rd Place	
2019	2019 Philippine Super Liga All-Filipino Conference	Cignal HD Spikers	Runner-up	
2019	2019 Philippine Super Liga Invitational Conference	Cignal HD Spikers	3rd Place	
