= 2014 Shakey's V-League season =

2014 SVL season
- League: Shakey's V-League
- Sport: Volleyball
- TV partner(s): GMA News TV (local); GMA Pinoy TV (international)

1st Conference
- Season champions: FEU Lady Tamaraws
- Runners-up: NU Lady Bulldogs
- Season MVP: Dindin Santiago

Open Conference
- Season champions: Philippine Army Lady Troopers
- Runners-up: Cagayan Valley Lady Rising Suns
- Season MVP: Rachel Anne Daquis (Army)

Reinforced Conference
- Season champions: W: Cagayan Valley Lady Rising Suns; M: IEM Volley Masters
- Runners-up: W: Philippine Army Lady Troopers; M: Systema Active Smashers
- Season MVP: W: Aiza Maizo-Pontillas (Cagayan); M: Jeffrey Jimenez (IEM)

Seasons
- ← 2013, 10th 12th, 2015 →

The 2014 Shakey's V-League (SVL) season was the eleventh season of the Shakey's V-League. There were three indoor conferences for this season.

== 1st Conference ==
Shakey's V-League 11th Season 1st Conference
Abbr.	Team	Colors	Head coach	Team captain
ADU	Adamson Lady Falcons		(Philippines) Sherwin Meneses	Marleen Cortel
AUN	Arellano Lady Chiefs		(Philippines) Roberto "Obet" Javier	Lexyl Lov Osero
ADM	Ateneo Lady Eagles		(Thailand) Anusorn "Tai" Bundit	Alyssa Valdez
CSB	Benilde Lady Blazers		(Philippines) Michael Cariño	Therese Veronas
DVO	Davao All-Stars Lady Agilas		(Philippines) Shane Alagao	Venus Flores
FEU	FEU Lady Tamaraws		(Philippines) Shaq Delos Santos	Yna Louise Papa
NUI	NU Lady Bulldogs		(Philippines) Edjet Mabbayad	Dindin Santiago
SLU	Saint Louis Lady Navigators		(Philippines) Henry Fuentes	Marian Torres
SSC	San Sebastian Lady Stags		(Philippines) Roger Gorayeb	Grethcel Soltones
SWU	Southwestern Lady Cobras		(Philippines) Jordan Paca	Neresa Villanueva
UPH	Perpetual Lady Altas		(Philippines) Sammy Acaylar	Honey Royse Tubino
UST	UST Growling Tigresses		(Philippines) Arthur Alan "Odjie" Mamon	Pamela Tricia Lastimosa

=== Preliminary round ===
Pool A

Pos	Team	Pld	W	L	Pts	SW	SL	SR	SPW	SPL	SPR	Qualification
1	Ateneo Lady Eagles	5	4	1	13	14	4	3.500	418	346	1.208	Quarterfinals
2	Arellano Lady Chiefs	5	4	1	12	14	5	2.800	423	343	1.233	Quarterfinals
3	Adamson Lady Falcons	5	4	1	11	13	5	2.600	424	324	1.309	Quarterfinals
4	Benilde Lady Blazers	5	2	3	5	6	11	0.545	337	379	0.889	Quarterfinals
5	SWU Lady Cobras	5	1	4	3	5	14	0.357	362	430	0.842	
6	SLU Lady Navigators	5	0	5	1	2	12	0.167	271	413	0.656	

Pool B

Pos	Team	Pld	W	L	Pts	SW	SL	SR	SPW	SPL	SPR	Qualification
1	UST Growling Tigresses	5	4	1	12	14	6	2.333	464	302	1.536	Quarterfinals
2	NU Lady Bulldogs	5	4	1	11	11	5	2.200	435	364	1.195	Quarterfinals
3	Davao Lady Agilas	5	4	1	11	13	7	1.857	466	454	1.026	Quarterfinals
4	FEU Lady Tamaraws	5	2	3	6	8	11	0.727	411	423	0.972	Quarterfinals
5	San Sebastian Lady Stags	5	1	4	2	5	17	0.294	373	446	0.836	
6	Perpetual Lady Altas	5	0	5	2	5	15	0.333	390	469	0.832	

=== Quarterfinal round ===
Pool C

Pos	Team	Pld	W	L	Pts	SW	SL	SR	SPW	SPL	SPR	Qualification
1	Adamson Lady Falcons	3	2	1	6	7	4	1.750	266	236	1.127	Semifinals
2	UST Growling Tigresses	3	2	1	6	7	4	1.750	263	243	1.082	Semifinals
3	Ateneo Lady Eagles	3	1	2	4	5	7	0.714	259	281	0.922	
4	Davao Lady Agilas	3	1	2	2	4	8	0.500	252	278	0.906	

Pool D

Pos	Team	Pld	W	L	Pts	SW	SL	SR	SPW	SPL	SPR	Qualification
1	NU Lady Bulldogs	3	3	0	9	9	0	MAX	225	144	1.563	Semifinals
2	FEU Lady Tamaraws	3	2	1	6	6	4	1.500	235	201	1.169	Semifinals
3	Arellano Lady Chiefs	3	1	2	3	3	6	0.500	189	226	0.836	
4	Benilde Lady Blazers	3	0	3	0	0	9	0.000	147	225	0.653	

=== Final round ===
- Ranking is based from the quarterfinals round.

Semifinals
D1	NU Lady Bulldogs	3	3
C2	UST Growling Tigresses	1	0
C1	Adamson Lady Falcons	3	0	1
D2	FEU Lady Tamaraws	2	3	3

Finals
NU Lady Bulldogs	0	0
FEU Lady Tamaraws	3	3
3rd place
UST Growling Tigresses	1	0
Adamson Lady Falcons	3	3

=== Individual awards ===
Award		Name
MVP	Finals: Conference:	Rachel Anne Daquis (FEU); Aleona Denise Santiago (NU)
Most Improved Player		Shiela Marie Pineda (Adamson)
Best Scorer		Ennajie Laure (UST)
Best Attacker		Ma. Paulina Soriano (Adamson)
Best Blocker		Marivic Velaine Meneses (UST)
Best Server		Aleona Denise Santiago (NU)
Best Digger		Dansel Jan Dusaran (UST)
Best Setter		Yna Louise Papa (FEU)
Best Receiver		Christine Agno (FEU)

=== Final standings ===
Rank	Team
1st place, gold medalist(s)	FEU Lady Tamaraws
2nd place, silver medalist(s)	NU Lady Bulldogs
3rd place, bronze medalist(s)	Adamson Lady Falcons
4	UST Growling Tigresses
5	Ateneo Lady Eagles
6	Davao Lady Agilas
7	Arellano Lady Chiefs
8	Benilde Lady Blazers
9	SWU Lady Cobras
10	San Sebastian Lady Stags
11	Perpetual Lady Altas
12	SLU Lady Navigators

== Open Conference ==
Shakey's V-League 11th Season Open Conference
Abbr.	Team	Company/School	Colors	Head coach	Team captain
ADM	Ateneo Lady Eagles	Ateneo de Manila University		(Thailand) Anusorn "Tai" Bundit	Alyssa Valdez
CAG	Cagayan Valley Lady Rising Suns	Province of Cagayan		(Philippines) Ernesto Pamilar	Maria Angeli Tabaquero
NUI	NU Lady Bulldogs	National University		(Philippines) Edjet Mabbayad	Siemens Desiree Dadang
PAF	Philippine Air Force Jet Spikers	Philippine Air Force		(Philippines) Sgt. Jasper Jimenez	Wendy Anne Semana
PAR	Philippine Army Lady Troopers	Philippine Army		(Philippines) Sgt. Emilio Reyes	Ma. Theresa Iratay
PLD	PLDT Home Telpad Turbo Boosters	Philippine Long Distance Telephone Co.		(Philippines) Roger Gorayeb	Suzanne Roces
PNP	PNP Lady Patrollers	Philippine National Police		(Philippines) Argie Dave	Michelle Datuin
UPD	UP Lady Maroons	University of the Philippines		(Philippines) Jerry Yee	Angeli Pauline Araneta

=== Preliminary round ===
Pos	Team	Pld	W	L	Pts	SW	SL	SR	SPW	SPL	SPR	Qualification
1	PLDT Home Telpad Turbo Boosters	7	6	1	18	18	4	4.500	525	451	1.164	Quarterfinals
2	Philippine Army Lady Troopers	7	6	1	17	19	6	3.167	607	505	1.202	Quarterfinals
3	Cagayan Valley Lady Rising Suns	7	6	1	17	18	6	3.000	573	496	1.155	Quarterfinals
4	Philippine Air Force Jet Spikers	7	4	3	11	13	11	1.182	537	518	1.037	Quarterfinals
5	NU Lady Bulldogs	7	3	4	9	10	14	0.714	541	558	0.970	Quarterfinals
6	Ateneo Lady Eagles	7	2	5	8	13	17	0.765	618	645	0.958	Quarterfinals
7	UP Lady Maroons	7	1	6	4	6	19	0.316	503	588	0.855	
8	PNP Lady Patrollers	7	0	7	0	1	21	0.048	406	550	0.738	

=== Quarterfinals round ===
Pos	Team	Pld	W	L	Pts	SW	SL	SR	SPW	SPL	SPR	Qualification
1	Philippine Army Lady Troopers	10	7	3	20	25	16	1.563	940	847	1.110	Semifinals
2	PLDT Home Telpad Turbo Boosters	10	6	4	19	21	13	1.615	776	738	1.051	Semifinals
3	Cagayan Valley Lady Rising Suns	10	5	5	15	19	18	1.056	838	831	1.008	Semifinals
4	Philippine Air Force Jet Spikers	10	5	5	14	18	21	0.857	843	841	1.002	Semifinals
5	Ateneo Lady Eagles	10	5	5	15	22	22	1.000	922	954	0.966	Fourth-seed playoffs
6	NU Lady Bulldogs	10	2	8	7	10	24	0.417	683	785	0.870	

Fourth-seed playoffs

Date	Time	Teams	Set	1	2	3	4	5	Total	Report
Aug 19	16:00	Philippine Air Force Jet Spikers	3	25	25	25			75	
Aug 19	16:00	Ateneo Lady Eagles	0	20	22	22			64	

=== Final round ===
- Ranking is based from the quarter-finals round.
- All series are best-of-3

Semifinals
1	Philippine Army Lady Troopers	3	3
4	Philippine Air Force Air Spikers	1	0
2	PLDT Home Telpad Turbo Boosters	1	1
3	Cagayan Valley Lady Rising Suns	3	3

Finals
Philippine Army Lady Troopers	3	3
Cagayan Valley Lady Rising Suns	1	0
3rd place
Philippine Air Force Jet Spikers	3	0
PLDT Home Telpad Turbo Boosters	1	3

=== Individual awards ===
Award		Name
MVP	Finals: Conference:	Jovelyn Gonzaga (Army); Rachel Anne Daquis (Army)
Best Scorer		Alyssa Valdez (Ateneo)
Best Attacker		Alyja Daphne Santiago (NU)
Best Blocker		Maika Angela Ortiz (Air Force)
Best Server		Rachel Anne Daquis (Army)
Best Digger		Shiela Marie Pineda (Cagayan)
Best Setter		Rhea Katrina Dimaculangan (Air Force)
Best Receiver		Lizlee Ann Gata-Pantone (PLDT)

=== Final standings ===
Rank	Team
1st place, gold medalist(s)	Philippine Army Lady Troopers
2nd place, silver medalist(s)	Cagayan Valley Lady Rising Suns
3rd place, bronze medalist(s)	PLDT Home Telpad Turbo Boosters
4	Philippine Air Force Jet Spikers
5	Ateneo Lady Eagles
6	NU Lady Bulldogs
7	UP Lady Maroons
8	PNP Lady Patrollers

== Reinforced Conference ==
=== Women's division ===
Shakey's V-League 11th Season Reinforced Open Conference (Women's Division)
Abbr.	Team	Company	Colors	Head coach	Team captain
CAG	Cagayan Valley Lady Rising Suns	Province of Cagayan		(Philippines) Ernesto Pamilar	Maria Angeli Tabaquero
MER	Meralco Power Spikers	Manila Electric Company		(Philippines) Brian Esquivel	Maureen Penetrante-Ouano
PAR	Philippine Army Lady Troopers	Philippine Army		(Philippines) Sgt. Emilio Reyes	Michelle Carolino
PLD	PLDT Home Telpad Turbo Boosters	Philippine Long Distance Telephone Co.		(Philippines) Roger Gorayeb	Suzanne Roces

Exhibition match

Date	Time	Teams	Set	1	2	3	4	5	Total	Report
May 10	14:00	Philippine Team Girls Under-17	0	15	23	23			61	
May 10	14:00	FEU Lady Tamaraws	3	25	25	25			75	
Jul 10	14:00	Philippine Team Girls Under-17	1	19	16	26	21		82	
Jul 10	14:00	NU Lady Bulldogs	3	25	25	24	25		99	

==== Preliminary round ====
Pos	Team	Pld	W	L	Pts	SW	SL	SR	SPW	SPL	SPR
1	Philippine Army Lady Troopers	6	6	0	15	18	8	2.250	595	536	1.110
2	Cagayan Valley Lady Rising Suns	6	4	2	14	16	7	2.286	533	457	1.166
3	PLDT Home Telpad Turbo Boosters	6	2	4	6	9	17	0.529	470	517	0.909
4	Meralco Power Spikers	6	0	6	1	4	18	0.222	433	521	0.831

==== Final round ====
Battle for Bronze

Date	Time	Teams	Set	1	2	3	4	5	Total	Report
Aug 28	16:00	PLDT Home Telpad Turbo Boosters	3	25	21	25	20	15	106	
Aug 28	16:00	Meralco Power Spikers	2	21	25	20	25	11	102	
Nov 6	16:00	Meralco Power Spikers	2	20	28	20	25	8	101	
Nov 6	16:00	PLDT Home Telpad Turbo Boosters	3	25	26	25	19	15	110	

Battle for Gold

Date	Time	Teams	Set	1	2	3	4	5	Total	Report
Nov 2	16:00	Philippine Army Lady Troopers	1	22	25	21	18		86	
Nov 2	16:00	Cagayan Valley Lady Rising Suns	3	25	20	25	25		95	
Nov 9	15:00	Cagayan Valley Lady Rising Suns	3	22	25	25	20	15	107	
Nov 9	15:00	Philippine Army Lady Troopers	2	25	23	17	25	9	99	

==== Individual awards ====
Award		Name
MVP	Finals: Conference:	Aiza Maizo-Pontillas (Cagayan)
Best Scorer		Aiza Maizo-Pontillas (Cagayan)
Best Attacker		Jovelyn Gonzaga (Army)
Best Blocker		Abigail Maraño (Meralco)
Best Server		Relea Ferina Saet (Cagayan)
Best Digger		Lizlee Ann Gata-Pantone (PLDT)
Best Setter		Rubie De Leon (PLDT)
Best Receiver		Shiela Marie Pineda (Cagayan)

==== Final standings ====
Rank	Team
1st place, gold medalist(s)	Cagayan Valley Lady Rising Suns
2nd place, silver medalist(s)	Philippine Army Lady Troopers
3rd place, bronze medalist(s)	PLDT Home Telpad Turbo Boosters
4	Meralco Power Spikers

=== Men's division ===
Shakey's V-League 11th Season Reinforced Open Conference (Men's Division)
Abbr.	Team	Company/School	Colors	Head coach	Team captain
FEU	FEU Tamaraws	Far Eastern University		(Philippines) Florentino "Kid" Santos	Manolo Refugia
IEM	IEM Volley Masters	Instituto Estetico Manila		(Philippines) Ernesto Balubar	Rence Ordoñez
RTU	RTU Blue Thunder	Rizal Technological University		(Philippines) George Pascua	Sabtal Abdul
SYS	Systema Active Smashers	Peerless Products Manufacturing Corp.		(Philippines) Arnold Laniog	Richard Gomez

==== Preliminary round ====
Pos	Team	Pld	W	L	Pts	SW	SL	SR	SPW	SPL	SPR
1	Instituto Estetico Manila	6	5	1	15	17	6	2.833	539	471	1.144
2	Systema Active Smashers	6	4	2	12	15	9	1.667	539	494	1.091
3	FEU Tamaraws	6	2	4	5	8	16	0.500	491	527	0.932
4	RTU Blue Thunder	6	1	5	4	8	17	0.471	493	571	0.863

==== Final round ====
Battle for Bronze

Date	Time	Teams	Set	1	2	3	4	5	Total	Report
Nov 4	14:00	FEU Tamaraws	3	30	21	25	25		101	
Nov 4	14:00	RTU Blue Thunder	1	28	25	16	23		92	
Nov 6	14:00	FEU Tamaraws	0	34	19	22			75	
Nov 6	14:00	RTU Blue Thunder	3	36	25	25			86	
Nov 16	13:00	FEU Tamaraws	3	25	20	16	28	15	104	
Nov 16	13:00	RTU Blue Thunder	2	22	25	25	26	13	111	

Battle for Gold

Date	Time	Teams	Set	1	2	3	4	5	Total	Report
Nov 2	14:00	Instituto Estetico Manila	2	25	25	19	23	14	106	
Nov 2	14:00	Systema Active Smashers	3	21	23	25	25	16	110	
Nov 9	13:00	Instituto Estetico Manila	3	19	25	13	25	15	97	
Nov 9	13:00	Systema Active Smashers	2	25	19	25	21	13	103	
Nov 16	16:00	Instituto Estetico Manila	3	25	24	25	14	15	103	
Nov 16	16:00	Systema Active Smashers	2	21	26	22	25	12	106	

==== Individual awards ====
Award		Name	Ref.
MVP	Finals: Conference:	Jeffrey Jimenez (IEM)	
Best Scorer		Salvador Depante (SYS)	
Best Attacker		Jeffrey Jimenez (IEM)	
Best Blocker		Rocky Hondrade (SYS)	
Best Server		Joshua Barrica (FEU)	
Best Digger		Kenneth Bayking (RTU)	
Best Setter		Rence Ordoñez (IEM)	
Best Receiver		Rikko Marmeto (FEU)	

==== Final standings ====
Rank	Team
1st place, gold medalist(s)	IEM Volley Masters
2nd place, silver medalist(s)	Systema Active Smashers
3rd place, bronze medalist(s)	FEU Tamaraws
4	RTU Blue Thunder

== Conference result ==
Rank	1st (Collegiate )	Open	Reinforced	
Rank	1st (Collegiate )	Open	Women	Men
1st place, gold medalist(s)	FEU Lady Tamaraws	Philippine Army	Cagayan Valley	IEM Volley Masters
2nd place, silver medalist(s)	NU Lady Bulldogs	Cagayan Valley	Philippine Army	Systema Active Smashers
3rd place, bronze medalist(s)	Adamson Lady Falcons	PLDT Home	PLDT Home	FEU Tamaraws
4	UST Growling Tigresses	Philippine Air Force	Meralco Power Spikers	RTU Blue Thunder
5	Ateneo Lady Eagles	Ateneo Lady Eagles	—N/a	—N/a
6	Davao Lady Agilas	NU Lady Bulldogs	—N/a	—N/a
7	Arellano Lady Chiefs	UP Lady Maroons	—N/a	—N/a
8	Benilde Lady Blazers	PNP Lady Patrollers	—N/a	—N/a
9	SWU Lady Cobras	—N/a	—N/a	—N/a
10	San Sebastian Lady Stags	—N/a	—N/a	—N/a
11	Perpetual Lady Altas	—N/a	—N/a	—N/a
12	SLU Lady Navigators	—N/a	—N/a	—N/a

== Broadcast partner ==
- GMA News TV (local)
- GMA Pinoy TV (international)
