= List of Shakey's V-League conference results =

The Shakey's V-League (SVL) hosted multiple conferences each season. The following is the results of each conference, showing where each team ranked in that conference.

In 2014, the SVL hosted a men's division, which went on to become Spikers' Turf in 2015. In 2017, the SVL and Spikers' Turf were merged into the rebranded Premier Volleyball League. The V-League was then revived in 2022, replacing the PVL's Collegiate Conference.

== List ==
=== Results ===
Season	Conference	Champion	Runner-up	3rd	4th	5th	6th	7th	8th	9th	10th	11th	12th
1	1st	UST	La Salle	Lyceum	San Sebastian	Letran	FEU	–	–	–	–	–	–
1	2nd	La Salle	UST	Letran	PSC	Lyceum	FEU	San Sebastian	–	–	–	–	–
2	1st	La Salle	UST	San Sebastian	Ateneo	FEU	Lyceum	–	–	–	–	–	–
3	1st	La Salle	San Sebastian	Adamson	Lyceum	FEU	PCU	Ateneo	UE	–	–	–	–
4	1st	UST	San Sebastian	Lyceum	La Salle	Ateneo	Adamson	FEU	Letran	–	–	–	–
4	2nd	UST	San Sebastian	Ateneo	Adamson	La Salle	FEU	Lyceum	Letran	–	–	–	–
5	1st	Adamson	Ateneo	San Sebastian	Lyceum	USLS	USJ–R	FEU	Benilde	–	–	–	–
5	2nd	San Sebastian	UST	La Salle	Adamson	FEU	Lyceum	Ateneo	Benilde	–	–	–	–
6	1st	UST	San Sebastian	Adamson	FEU	USLS	USJ–R	Ateneo	Benilde	Lyceum	UP	–	–
6	2nd	UST	Adamson	FEU	San Sebastian	Ateneo	Benilde	Lyceum	UP	–	–	–	–
7	1st	UST	San Sebastian	Ateneo	Lyceum	Adamson	USLS	SWU	Benilde	FEU	USJ–R	–	–
7	2nd	Adamson	San Sebastian	Lyceum	FEU	Ateneo	NU	Perpetual	Benilde	–	–	–	–
8	1st	Ateneo	Adamson	USLS	NU	Perpetual	Lyceum	SWU	FEU	San Sebastian	Benilde	–	–
8	Open	Army	San Sebastian	Ateneo	Navy	Air Force	Maynilad	Perpetual	-	-	-	–	–
8	SEA Club Invitational	(Vietnam) Vietsovpetro	Army	(Malaysia) MAS Club	Ateneo	-	-	-	-	-	-	–	–
9	1st	Ateneo	UST	San Sebastian	Perpetual	Adamson	USLS	NU	FEU	Letran	SWU	–	–
9	Open	Sandugo-SSC-R	Cagayan-UPHSD	Army	Ateneo	Navy	FEU	-	-	-	-	–	–
10	1st	NU	Ateneo	UST	Adamson	Perpetual	Arellano	San Sebastian	DLSU-D	Letran	USC	–	–
10	Open	Cagayan	Smart	Army	Air Force	Meralco	PNP	Navy	FEU	–	–	–	–
11	1st	FEU	NU	Adamson	UST	Ateneo	Davao	Arellano	Benilde	SWU	San Sebastian	Perpetual	SLU
11	Open	Army	Cagayan	PLDT	Air Force	Ateneo	NU	UP	PNP	–	–	–	–
11	Reinforced	Cagayan (W); IEM (M)	Army (W); Systema (M)	PLDT (W); FEU (M)	Meralco (W); RTU (M)	–	–	–	–	–	–	–	–
12	Open	PLDT	Army	Cagayan	Meralco	Navy	Fourbees	Baguio	Coast Guard	–	–	–	–
12	Collegiate	NU	Ateneo	FEU	UST	Arellano	UP	CSB	DLSU-D	Univ.of Batangas	SSC–R	TIP	PUP
12	Reinforced	PLDT	Army	UP	Navy	Kia Forte	Coast Guard	–	–	–	–	–	–
13	Open	Pocari Sweat	PAF	BaliPure	Laoag	NU	UP	Iriga	Baguio	–	–	–	–
13	Collegiate	NU	Ateneo	UP	FEU	SSC–R	UST	TIP	San Beda	Perpetual	Benilde	–	–
13	Reinforced	Pocari	Customs	BaliPure	UST	UP	Laoag	PAF	Coast Guard	–	–	–	–

=== All-Stars ===
Year	Champions	Score	Runners-up	Ref.
2013	Smart All Stars	3–2	Shakey's All Stars	
2016	Team Palaban	3–1	Team Puso	

== See also ==
- List of Premier Volleyball League conference results
- List of Spikers' Turf conference results
- List of V-League (Philippines) conference results
