= Ging Balse =

Filipina volleyball player (born 1983)

Personal information
- Full name: Mary Jean Balse-Pabayo
- Nickname: Ging
- Nationality: Filipino
- Born: May 31, 1983 (age 43)
- Hometown: Panabo, Davao, Philippines
- Height: 1.80 m (5 ft 11 in)
- Education: University of Santo Tomas

Volleyball information
- Position: Middle Blocker
- Number: 5

National team
2003–2005	Philippines
Honours
Women's indoor volleyball
Representing the Philippines
SEA Games
Bronze medal – third place	2003 Hanoi	Team
Bronze medal – third place	2005 Manila	Team

Mary Jean Balse-Pabayo (born May 31, 1983), known as Ging Balse, is a Filipina volleyball player who last played as a middle blocker for the Philippine Army Lady Troopers of the Premier Volleyball League (PVL). She was a member of the Philippines women's national volleyball team that won the bronze medal in the 2005 Southeast Asian Games.

== Clubs ==
- (Philippines) UST Golden Tigresses (2004–2009)
- (Philippines) Lyceum Lady Pirates as guest player (2010)
- (Philippines) Generika-Army Lady Troopers (2014)
- (Philippines) RC Cola-Army Troopers (2016)
- (Philippines) COCOLIFE Asset Managers (2017–2018)
- (Philippines) Smart Giga Hitters (2018)
- (Philippines) Pacific Town - Army Lady Troopers (2019)
- (Philippines) Petron Blaze Spikers (2020)
- (Philippines) Philippine Army Lady Troopers (2008–present)

== Awards ==
=== Individual ===
- 2004 Shakey's V-League Season 1 First Conference "Conference Most Valuable Player"
- 2004 UAAP Season 67 "Rookie of the Year"
- 2005 Shakey's V-League Season 2 First Conference "Best Receiver"
- 2005 Shakey's V-League Season 2 Second Conference "Best Server"
- 2007 Shakey's V-League Season 4 First Conference "Finals Most Valuable Player"
- 2007 Shakey's V-League Season 4 First Conference "Best Attacker"
- 2007 UAAP Season 70 "Best Attacker"
- 2009 Shakey's V-League Season 6 First Conference "Conference Most Valuable Player"
- 2010 Shakey's V-League Season 7 Second Conference "Best Attacker"
- 2011 Shakey's V-League Season 8 SEA Club Invitational "Best Server"
- 2013 Shakey's V-League Season 10 Second Conference "Best Server"
- 2014 PSL All-Filipino Conference "2nd Best Middle Blocker"

=== Collegiate ===
- 2004 Shakey's V-League Season 1 First Conference - - Champion, with UST Tigresses
- 2004 UAAP Season 67 - - - Runner-up, with UST Tigresses
- 2005 Shakey's V-League Season 2 First Conference - Runner-up, with UST Tigresses
- 2005 Shakey's V-League Season 2 Second Conference - Runner-up, with UST Tigresses
- 2006 UAAP Season 69 - - Champion, with UST Tigresses
- 2007 Shakey's V-League Season 4 First Conference - - Champion, with UST Tigresses
- 2007 Shakey's V-League Season 4 Second Conference - - Champion, with UST Tigresses
- 2007 UAAP Season 70 - - Bronze medal, with UST Tigresses
- 2008 UAAP Season 71 - - Bronze medal, with UST Tigresses
- 2009 Shakey's V-League Season 6 First Conference - - Champion, with UST Tigresses
- 2009 Shakey's V-League Season 6 Second Conference - - Champion, with UST Tigresses
- 2010 Shakey's V-League Season 7 First Conference - - Champion, with UST Tigresses
- 2010 Shakey's V-League Season 7 Second Conference - - Bronze medal, with Lyceum Lady Pirates

=== Club ===
- 2011 Shakey's V-League Season 8 Open Conference - - Champion, with Philippine Army Lady Troopers
- 2011 Shakey's V-League Season 8 SEA Club Invitational Conference - - Runner-up, with Philippine Army Lady Troopers
- 2012 Shakey's V-League Season 9 Open Conference - - Bronze medal, with Philippine Army Lady Troopers
- 2013 Shakey's V-League Season 10 Open Conference - - Bronze medal, with Philippine Army Lady Troopers
- 2013 PSL Invitational Conference - - Champion, with Philippine Army Lady Troopers
- 2013 PSL Grand Prix Conference - - - Champion, with Philippine Army Lady Troopers
- 2014 Shakey's V-League 11th Season Open Conference - - Champion, with Philippine Army Lady Troopers
- 2014 Shakey's V-League 11th Season Reinforced Conference - - Runner-up, with Philippine Army Lady Troopers
- 2014 PSL All-Filipino Conference - - Champion, with Generika-Army Lady Troopers
- 2015 Shakey's V-League 12th Season Open Conference - - Runner-up, with Philippine Army Lady Troopers
- 2015 Shakey's V-League 12th Season Reinforced Conference - - Runner-up, with Philippine Army Lady Troopers
- 2016 PSL Invitational Cup - - Champion, with RC Cola-Army Troopers
- 2016 PSL All-Filipino Conference - - Bronze medal, with RC Cola-Army Troopers
- 2019 Premier Volleyball League Reinforced Conference - - Bronze medal, with Pacific Town - Army Lady Troopers

=== National team ===
- (Vietnam) 2003 Southeast Asian Games - - Bronze medal
- (Philippines) 2005 Southeast Asian Games - - Bronze medal
