= Ella de Jesus =

Filipino volleyball player

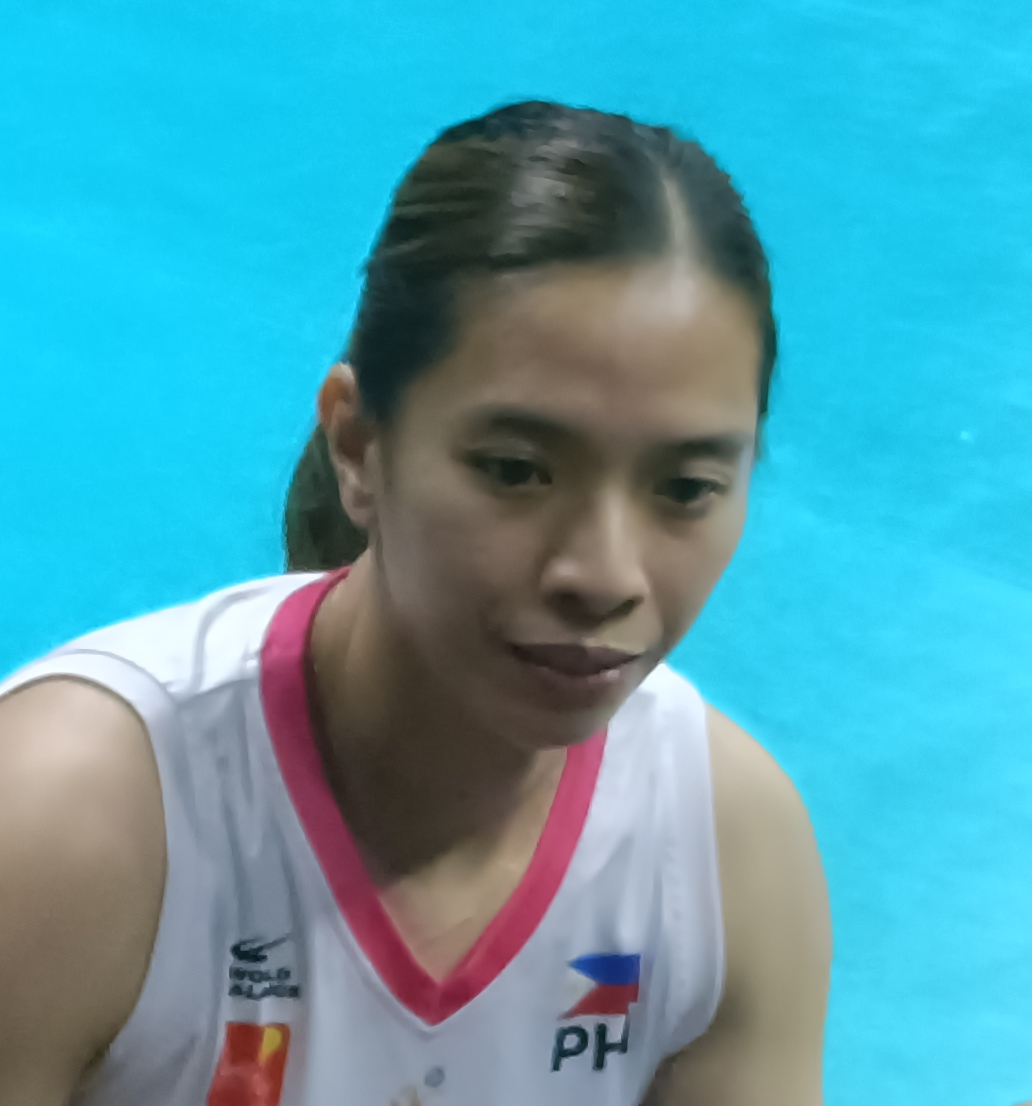
- De Jesus in 2025

Personal information
- Full name: Jorella Marie de Jesus
- Nickname: Ella
- Nationality: Filipino
- Born: August 17, 1993 (age 33); Manila, Philippines
- Hometown: Navotas, Philippines
- Height: 154 cm (5 ft 1 in)
- Weight: 54 kg (119 lb)
- Spike: 265 cm (104 in)
- Block: 253 cm (100 in)
- Education: Ateneo de Manila University

Volleyball information
- Position: Outside Hitter/Libero
- Current club: Creamline Cool Smashers
- Number: 8

Career
Years	Teams
2015	PLDT
2016	BaliPure
2017–2019	Perlas Spikers
2020–present	Creamline Cool Smashers

National team
2015	Philippines U23
2022	Philippines

Jorella Marie de Jesus (born August 17, 1993) is a Filipino professional volleyball player who is an outside hitter and libero for the Creamline Cool Smashers of the Premier Volleyball League (PVL). She was a member of the Ateneo de Manila University's collegiate varsity team from 2011 to 2015, and also of the 2015 Philippines U23 national team. She played for PLDT Home Ultera Fast Hitters as a Libero for the 2015 season.

== Personal life ==
De Jesus was born on August 17, 1993, in Manila, Philippines. She studied at the Ateneo de Manila University in college and finished with an AB Psychology degree.

She is currently in a relationship with former Adamson Lady Falcons and fellow Creamline Cool Smashers player Jema Galanza.

== Career ==
Ella was a former Best Spiker and Best Blocker in her high school years. After graduating high school, she studied at Ateneo de Manila University and was a varsity player of the Women's volleyball team alongside the "Fab five". After the Fab five's departure, she won her first and second championship in the UAAP (Season 76 & 77). De Jesus played with the Philippines U-23 national team in 2015. She also played for the PLDT Home Ultera Fast Hitters as a Libero during the 2015 Shakey's V-League reinforced conference.

== Awards ==
=== Collegiate ===
- 2011 Shakey's V-League Season 8: 1st Conference – Champions, with Ateneo De Manila University Lady Eagles
- 2011 Shakey's V-League Season 8: Open Conference – Bronze medal, with Ateneo De Manila University Lady Eagles
- 2012 UAAP Season 74 volleyball tournaments – Silver medal, with Ateneo De Manila University Lady Eagles
- 2012 Shakey's V-League Season 9: 1st Conference – Champions, with Ateneo De Manila University Lady Eagles
- 2013 UAAP Season 75 volleyball tournaments – Silver medal, with Ateneo De Manila University Lady Eagles
- 2014 UAAP Season 76 volleyball tournaments – Champions, with Ateneo De Manila University Lady Eagles
- 2014 ASEAN University Games – Bronze medal, with Ateneo De Manila University Lady Eagles
- 2015 UAAP Season 77 volleyball tournaments – Champions, with Ateneo De Manila University Lady Eagles
- 2015 Shakey's V-League Collegiate Conference – Silver medal, with Ateneo De Manila University Lady Eagles

=== Club Team ===
- 2015 Shakey's V-League Reinforced Open Conference – Champions, with PLDT Home Ultera Ultra Fast Hitters
- 2016 Shakey's V-League Open Conference – Bronze medal, with BaliPure Purest Water Defenders
- 2018 Premier Volleyball League Reinforced Conference – Bronze medal, with Perlas Spikers
- 2018 Premier Volleyball League Open Conference – Bronze medal, with Perlas Spikers
- 2019 Premier Volleyball League Open Conference – Bronze medal, with Perlas Spikers
- 2021 Premier Volleyball League Open Conference – runner-Up, with Creamline Cool Smashers
- 2022 Premier Volleyball League Open Conference – Champion, with Creamline Cool Smashers
- 2022 Premier Volleyball League Invitational Conference – Champion, with Creamline Cool Smashers
- 2022 Premier Volleyball League Reinforced Conference – Bronze medal, with Creamline Cool Smashers
- 2023 Premier Volleyball League All-Filipino Conference – Champion, with Creamline Cool Smashers
- 2023 Premier Volleyball League Invitational Conference – Runner-up, with Creamline Cool Smashers
- 2023 Premier Volleyball League Second All-Filipino Conference – Champions, with Creamline Cool Smashers
- 2024 Premier Volleyball League All-Filipino Conference – Champions, with Creamline Cool Smashers
- 2024 Premier Volleyball League Reinforced Conference – Champions, with Creamline Cool Smashers
