= Tina Salak =

Filipino volleyball player and coach

Personal information
- Full name: Cristina Salak
- Nationality: Filipino
- Born: August 10, 1976 (age 50)
- Home town: Cavite, Philippines
- Education: Far Eastern University
- Height: 1.80 m (5 ft 11 in)
- Weight: 65 kg (143 lb)
- Spike: 277 cm (109 in)
- Block: 273 cm (107 in)

Coaching information
- Current team: Akari Chargers

Volleyball information
- Position: Setter
- Number: 1

Career
- Years: Team
- 2005–2016: Philippine Army Lady Troopers
- 2017–2018: COCOLIFE Asset Managers
- 2021: Chery Tiggo 7 Pro Crossovers

National team
- Years: Team
- 2005: Philippines
Honours
Women's indoor volleyball
Representing the Philippines
SEA Games
Bronze medal – third place	2005 Manila	Team

Cristina Salak (born August 10, 1976) is a Filipina professional volleyball coach and former player who is the head coach for the Akari Chargers of the Premier Volleyball League (PVL).

== Career ==
=== Playing career ===
==== Club ====
Salak became SVL Season 8, 2nd Conference champion with Philippine Army Lady Troopers, she was SVL Season 8, SEA Club Invitational Runner-Up, and SVL Season 9, 2nd Conference and Season 10 bronze medalist. She was again SVL Season 11, 2nd Conference champion before being silver medalist during the SVL Season 11, Reinforced Open, SVL Season 12, Open Conference and SVL Season 12, Reinforced Open.

For the 2013 Philippine Super Liga Invitational Conference she claimed again with the Philippine Army Lady Troopers the championship. Salak was named as the conference's Best Blocker and championship playing with TMS-Philippine Army Lady Troopers and 2014 Philippine Super Liga All-Filipino Conference champion and Most Valuable player with Generika-Army Lady Troopers.

In June 2016, Salak announced her retirement as a player upon completing the 2016 season of the PSL. She played her final PSL game on December 8, 2016. She announced her intention to pursue a coaching career.

Salak would be appointed as an assistant coach for COCOLIFE Asset Managers. She would briefly resumed playing during the 2017 and 2018 PSL Grand Prix conferences for COCOLIFE.

Salak briefly played for the Chery Tiggo 7 Pro Crossovers in the 2021 Premier Volleyball League Open Conference.

==== National team ====
Salak was part of the national team that won bronze medal in the 2005 SEA Games in the women's indoor volleyball. She also competed under the Philippine flag in the 2005 AVC Qualification for the 2006 FIVB Women's World Championship held at Ratchaburi, Thailand.

In 2015, she was named as one of the 18 select women for the tryouts held by the PVF. They were part of a national pool that was to represent the Philippines for the 2015 SEA Games held in Singapore.

=== Coaching ===
In February 2017, a new PSL team, COCOLIFE Asset Managers announced the appointment of Salak as its assistant coach. Salak resumed her role as assistant coach for the team, renamed United VC, in 2019.

Salak was the head coach of the FEU Lady Tamaraws from 2022 to 2023. She was re-appointed head coach starting UAAP Season 87. She left again after Season 88 in June 2026 to focus with her role with the Akari Chargers of the Premier Volleyball League (PVL).

In January 2024, Salak joined Akari as assistant coach. She became the team's head coach in June 2025.

== Personal life ==
Salak has Pauline Gretel as her longtime partner. The couple entered into a civil union in Canada on January 29, 2024.

== Clubs ==
- (Philippines) Philippine Army Lady Troopers (2005–2016)
- (Philippines) COCOLIFE Asset Managers (2017–2018)

== Awards ==
=== Individual ===
Philippine Super Liga

- Most Valuable Player – 2014 All-Filipino
- Best Blocker – 2013 Invitational

Shakey's V-League

- Best Setter – 2012 Open Conference

=== Team ===
Philippine Super Liga

- 2013 Philippine Super Liga Invitational Conference - Champion, with TMS-Philippine Army Lady Troopers
- 2013 Philippine Super Liga Grand Prix Conference - Champion, with TMS-Philippine Army Lady Troopers
- 2014 Philippine Super Liga All-Filipino Conference - Champion, with Generika-Army Lady Troopers

Shakey's V-League

- 2011 Shakey's V-League Open Conference - Champion, with Philippine Army Lady Troopers
- 2011 Shakey's V-League SEA Club Invitational - Runner-Up, with Philippine Army Lady Troopers
- 2012 Shakey's V-League Open Conference – Bronze medal, with Philippine Army Lady Troopers
- 2013 Shakey's V-League Open Conference – Bronze medal, with Philippine Army Lady Troopers
- 2014 Shakey's V-League Open Conference - Champion, with Philippine Army Lady Troopers
- 2014 Shakey's V-League Reinforced Open Conference - Runner-Up, with Philippine Army Lady Troopers
- 2015 Shakey's V-League Open Conference - Runner-Up, with Philippine Army Lady Troopers
- 2015 Shakey's V-League Reinforced Open Conference - Runner-Up, with Philippine Army Lady Troopers
