= Volleyball at the 2014 Philippine National Games – women's tournament =

2014 Women's Volleyball
Tournament details
- Dates: 17–23 May
- Teams: 9
- Venues: 2 (in 2 host cities)

Final positions
- Champions: Philippine Air Force (2nd title)

Tournament awards
- MVP: Iari Yongco

The 2014 edition of the POC-PSC Philippine National Games was held in Manila on May 17 to 23, 2014. The Philippine Air Force won the championship.

== Pools composition ==
Pool A	Pool B
Philippine Air Force; De La Salle Lady Spikers; Cebu; Emilio Aguinaldo College; Rizal Technological University	Cagayan Valley Lady Rising Suns; UP Lady Maroons; National College of Business and Arts; Technological Institute of the Philippines

== Venue ==
- Arellano University, Taft Avenue, Pasay
- Ninoy Aquino Stadium, Manila

== Pool standing procedure ==
Match won 3–0 or 3–1: 3 points for the winner, 0 points for the loser
Match won 3–2: 2 points for the winner, 1 point for the loser
In case of tie, the teams will be classified according to the following criteria:
number of matches won, sets ratio and points ratio

== Preliminary round ==
=== Pool A ===
Pos	Team	Pld	W	L	Pts	SW	SL	SR	SPW	SPL	SPR	Qualification
1	De La Salle Lady Spikers	4	4	0	12	12	0	MAX	150	30	5.000	Semifinals
2	Philippine Air Force	4	3	1	9	9	3	3.000	150	85	1.765	Semifinals
3	CEBU	1	1	0	3	3	0	MAX	75	54	1.389	
4	Emilio Aguinaldo College	4	1	3	3	3	10	0.300	127	157	0.809	
5	Rizal Technological University	4	0	4	0	1	12	0.083	172	237	0.726	

Date	Time		Score		Set 1	Set 2	Set 3	Set 4	Set 5	Total	Report
17 May	08:00	De La Salle Lady Spikers	3-	Rizal Technological University							
18 May	08:00	Philippine Air Force	3-	Emilio Aguinaldo College							
18 May		De La Salle Lady Spikers	3-	CEBU							
18 May		Rizal Technological University	0-3	CEBU	18-25	16-25	20-25			54–0	
18 May		Philippine Air Force	0-3	De La Salle Lady Spikers							
19 May		Rizal Technological University	0-3	Philippine Air Force	10-25	18-25	8-25			36–0	
19 May		Emilio Aguinaldo College	0-3	De La Salle Lady Spikers	8-25	13-25	9-25			30–0	
19 May		CEBU	0–3	Philippine Air Force	22-25	16-25	11-25			49–0	
19 May		Emilio Aguinaldo College	3–1	Rizal Technological University	25-20	25-21	22-25	25-16		97–0	
20 May		CEBU	–	Emilio Aguinaldo College							

=== Pool B ===
Pos	Team	Pld	W	L	Pts	SW	SL	SR	SPW	SPL	SPR	Qualification
1	Cagayan Valley Lady Rising Suns	2	2	0	5	6	3	2.000	206	181	1.138	Semifinals
2	UP Lady Maroons	2	1	1	4	5	4	1.250	189	186	1.016	Semifinals
3	National College of Business and Arts	2	0	2	0	2	6	0.333	164	192	0.854	
4	Technological Institute of the Philippines	2	0	2	0	2	6	0.333	164	192	0.854	

Date	Time		Score		Set 1	Set 2	Set 3	Set 4	Set 5	Total	Report
17 May		Cagayan Valley Lady Rising Suns	–	National College of Business and Arts							
17 May		UP Lady Maroons	-	Technological Institute of the Philippines							
18 May		Cagayan Valley Lady Rising Suns	–	Technological Institute of the Philippines							
18 May		Cagayan Valley Lady Rising Suns	–	University of the Philippines							
18 May		Technological Institute of the Philippines	–	National College of Business and Arts							

== Final round ==
Semifinals
20 May
De La Salle Lady Spikers	3
UP Lady Maroons	0
20 May
Philippine Air Force	3
Cagayan Valley Lady Rising Suns	2

Final
23 May
De La Salle Lady Spikers	2
Philippine Air Force	3
3rd place match
22 May
UP Lady Maroons	0
Cagayan Valley Lady Rising Suns	3

=== Semifinals ===
25-21, 25-15, 25-14.

Date	Time		Score		Set 1	Set 2	Set 3	Set 4	Set 5	Total	Report
20 May		De La Salle Lady Spikers	3–0	UP Lady Maroons	25-21	25–15	25–14			75–29	
20 May		Philippine Air Force	3–2	Cagayan Valley Lady Rising Suns	25–18	20–25	23–25	25–19	15-13	108–87	

=== 3rd place match ===
Date	Time		Score		Set 1	Set 2	Set 3	Set 4	Set 5	Total	Report
22 May		UP Lady Maroons	0–3	Cagayan Valley Lady Rising Suns	23–25	19–20	22–25			64–70	Results

=== Final ===
Date	Time		Score		Set 1	Set 2	Set 3	Set 4	Set 5	Total	Report
23 May		De La Salle Lady Spikers	2–3	Philippine Air Force	22–25	28–26	25–20	24-26	7-15	106–71	Results

== Final standing ==
Rank	Team
1st place, gold medalist(s)	Philippine Air Force
2nd place, silver medalist(s)	De La Salle Lady Spikers
3rd place, bronze medalist(s)	Cagayan Valley Lady Rising Suns
4	UP Lady Maroons

2014 Women's Volleyball Champions

2nd title

Team Roster
Wendy Ann Semana (c), Rhea Dimaculangan, Mary Ann Balmaceda, Jocemer Tapic, Iari Yongco, Angel Mae Antipuesto, Jill Gustillo, Jennifer Manzano, Judy Ann Caballejo, Maika Ortiz, Joy Cases, Liza Deramos, May Ann Pantino, Gena Andaya
Head coach
Clarence Esteban

== Awards ==
- Most valuable player
  Iari Yongco (Philippine Air Force)
- Best attacker
  Victonara Galang (De La Salle Lady Spikers)
- Best blocker
  Mika Aereen Reyes (De La Salle Lady Spikers)
- Best server
  Kim Fajardo (De La Salle Lady Spikers)
- Best setter
  Rhea Dimaculangan (Philippine Air Force)
- Best receiver
  Angeli Tabaquero (Cagayan Valley Lady Rising Suns)
- Best digger
  Mary Ann Balmaceda (Philippine Air Force)
