= Philippine Air Force Lady Jet Spikers =

Women's volleyball team representing the Philippine Air Force

- Full name: Philippine Air Force Lady Jet Spikers
- Short name: Air Force
- Nickname: Lady Jet Spikers
- Ground: Villamor Air Base, Pasay, Metro Manila
- Captain: Wendy Anne Semana
- League: Premier Volleyball League
- 2019 Open: 5th Place
- Championships: Philippine National Games: 2

Uniforms
Home	Away

The Philippine Air Force Lady Jet Spikers represent the Philippine Air Force in women's volleyball competitions. It previously competed in the Shakey's V-League/Premier Volleyball League. The team is composed of enlisted personnel and reinforced with civilian players from time to time.

From 2014 to 2015, the team collaborated with the RC Cola Raiders in the Philippine Super Liga, sharing its players and coaching staff, competing as the RC Cola-Air Force Raiders.

== Honors ==
=== Team ===
==== Premier Volleyball League ====
Season	Conference	Title
2011 (SVL Season 8)	Open	5th place
2012; SVL Season 9	Open	did not compete -
2013; SVL Season 10	Open	4th place
2014; SVL Season 11	Open	4th place
2014; SVL Season 11	Reinforced	did not compete -
2015; SVL Season 12	Open	did not compete -
2015; SVL Season 12	Reinforced	did not compete -
2016; SVL Season 13	Open	Runner-up
2016; SVL Season 13	Reinforced	7th place
2017	Reinforced	6th place
2017	Open	4th place
2018	Reinforced	4th place
2018	Open	5th place
2019	Reinforced	did not compete -
2019	Open	5th place

==== POC-PSC Philippine National Games ====
Season	Conference	Title
2013	POC-PSC PNG	Champion
2014	POC-PSC PNG	Champion

=== Individual ===
==== Premier Volleyball League ====
Season	Conference	Award	Name
2014	Open	Best Blocker	Maika Angela Ortiz
2014	Open	Best Setter	Rhea Dimaculangan
2016	Open	Best Setter	Wendy Semana
2017	Open	Best Opposite Spiker	Iari Yongco
2018	Reinforced	Most Valuable Player (Conference)	Myla Pablo
2018	Reinforced	2nd Best Outside Spiker	Myla Pablo
2018	Reinforced	1st Best Middle Blocker	Jeanette Panaga

==== Others ====
Season	Conference	Award	Name
2014	POC-PSC PNG		
2014	POC-PSC PNG	Best Setter	Rhea Dimaculangan
2014	POC-PSC PNG	Best Digger	Mary Ann Balmaceda
2014	POC-PSC PNG	Most Valuable Player	Iari Yongco

== Team captains ==
- (Philippines) Wendy Anne Semana (2011 - 2016), (2019)
- (Philippines) Joy Gazelle Cases (2017)
- (Philippines) Myla Pablo (2018)

== See also ==
- RC Cola Raiders
- Philippine Air Force Air Spikers
