= 2016 Shakey's V-League Open Conference =

Shakey's V-League 13th Season Open Conference
- League: Shakey's V-League
- Sport: Volleyball
- Teams: 8
- TV partner: ABS-CBN Sports+Action

Final
- Champions: Pocari Sweat Lady Warriors
- Runners-up: Philippine Air Force
- Finals MVP: Myla Pablo

Shakey's V-League seasons
- ← 12, Reinforced 13, Collegiate →

The 2016 Shakey's V-League Open Conference was the 26th conference of the Shakey's V-League and the first conference of the 2016 season. The opening ceremonies were held on May 22, 2016 at the Filoil Flying V Centre, San Juan before the first games were held on May 28, also at the same venue.

The previous season's conference champion, PLDT Home Ultera Ultra Fast Hitters, and runner-up Philippine Army Lady Troopers, decided to forgo their participation in this year's Open Conference.

There were eight (8) competing teams for this conference: NU Lady Bulldogs, UP Lady Maroons, Pocari Sweat, Team Laoag, Team Baguio, Team Iriga, Bali Pure and Philippine Air Force Air Spikers.

ABS-CBN Sports+Action is covering the games live on television.

== Participating teams ==
Abbr	Team
BPU	BaliPure Purest Water Defenders
NUI	National University Lady Bulldogs
PAF	Philippine Air Force Jet Spikers
POC	Pocari Sweat Lady Warriors
BAG	Baguio Summer Spikers
IRG	Iriga Lady Oragons
PSM	Laoag Power Smashers
UPD	University of the Philippines Lady Maroons

=== Team's Line-ups ===
Legend
S	Setter
MB	Middle blocker
OH	Outside hitter
OP	Opposite hitter
L	Libero
(c)	Team captain

BaliPure Purest Water Defenders
No.	Player name	Position
1	SOLTONES, Grethcel	OH
2	VALDEZ, Alyssa (c)	OH
5	TAJIMA, Mae	MB
6	GERVACIO, Angeline	OP
7	TAN, Bea	OH
8	SORIANO, Ma. Rosario	MB
9	MARCIANO, Janine	OH
10	EROA, Alyssa	L
11	AGBAYANI, Ivanah	S
12	FERRER, Jem	S
13	LAZARO, Dennise Michelle	L/Service Specialist
14	DE JESUS, Ella	OH
15	BELLO, Karla	S
16	AHOMIRO, Amy	MB
	SORIANO, Ma. Rosario	Playing Coach

NU Lady Bulldogs
No.	Player name	Position
3	SANTIAGO, Alyja Daphne (c)	MB
4	NABOR, Jasmine	S
5	SATO, Risa	MB
6	DOROMAL, Roma	OH
8	CHAVEZ, Joni	L
9	URDAS, Aiko Sweet	OP
11	DORIA, Rosielyn	MB
13	VALDEZ, Gayle	L
14	SINGH, Jorelle	OH
15	PARAN, Audrey	OH
	GORAYEB, Roger	Head coach

PAF Jet Spikers
No.	Player name	Position
1	CRISOSTOMO, Mae Denise	L
2	LEGASPI, Mariel	
4	YONGCO, Iari	MB
5	BALMACEDA, Mary Ann	L
7	SEMANA, Wendy Ann (c)	S
8	MANZANO, Jennifer	OP
9	PALOMATA, Dell	MB
10	PAPA, Yna Louise	S
11	CABALLEJO, Judy Anne	OH
12	CASES, Joy	OH
14	ABANTO, Anna Camille	OH
16	ANTIPUESTO, Angel	MB
17	TAPIC, Jocemer	MB
	JIMENEZ, Jasper	Head coach

Pocari Sweat Lady Warriors
No.	Player name	Position
2	ALKUINO, Erika	MB
3	BALITON, Roselle	MB
4	FAJARDO, Rossan	OH
5	GOHING, Melissa	L
6	ESPELITA, Sarah Jane	S
7	GUMABAO, Michele (c)	OP
8	NEPOMUCENO, Maricar	OP
9	KASILAG, Elaine	OH
10	ENCLONA, Rica Jane	L
11	VARGAS, Rosemarie	OH
12	SY, Gyzelle	S
16	MALALUAN, Luthgarda	MB
17	DADANG, Desiree	MB
18	PABLO, Myla	OH
	ABELLA, Rommel John	Head coach

Baguio Summer Spikers
No.	Player name	Position
	ABELLA, Cielo Marcelle	
	ARANCES, Raynar Yannah	
	ATUBAN, Cherry	
	ATUBAN, Mary Ann	
	BALANTAC, Shirley	
	BELSA, Belle	
	COSTALES, Aloisa	
	DEGAY, Rochelle	
	DICKENSEN, Carmela Care	
	GUYGUYON, Nicole Brielle	
	REYES, Lyka Mae	
	ROSSI, Coleen	
	TORRES, Marian Fleurizze	
	TSUCHIYA, Krissian (c)	
	TOLENTINO, Clarissa	Head coach

Iriga Lady Oragons
No.	Player name	Position
1	PACARDO, Arianne Frances	OH
2	LANA, Janeca Janine	OP
3	LEVINA, Karen	MB
4	BOMBITA, Ayra Mikael	OH
5	CO, Edcel	OP
7	BOMBITA, Grazielle	OH
8	GUAB, Ethna (c)	
9	ALFELOR-GAZMEN, Madelaine	OH
10	BUENAVENTURA, Keshia	L
11	ALMELOR, Mariaser	L
12	MONDRAGON, Gretchen	
13	BARAL, Regina	S
18	FAURILLO, Hannah	MB
19	ALVAREZ, Maria Shola May	OH
	PABILONIA, Elvis	Head coach

Laoag Power Smashers
No.	Player name	Position
2	KRAMER, Brandy	OP
3	GALANZA, Jessica	OH
4	PAAT, Mylene	OP
6	SANTE, Rialeen	MB
7	TAN, Alexandria Denice	OH
8	EMNAS, Fenela	S
9	GALANG, Jan Eunice	L
10	STA.RITA, Joyce	MB
11	LAYUG, Alyssa	MB
12	VILLEGAS, Katherine	OH
13	GILLEGO, Charlene	L
15	EULALIO, Wenneth	OH
17	SAET, Relea Ferina (c)	S
18	PRADO, Jovielyn	OH
	PAMILIAR, Nes	Head coach

UP Lady Maroons
No.	Player name	Position
2	BASARTE, Mae Angeli	OP
3	LAYUG, Maristela	MB
7	CHOPITEA, Sheena	OH
8	BERSOLA, Katherine (c)	MB
9	RAMOS, Jessima	MB
10	MOLDE, Isa	OH
11	BUITRE, Marian	MB
12	GAISER, Princess	L
13	DOROG, Justine	OP
14	GANNABAN, Aeisha	MB
16	CALILING, Rose Marie	S
18	CARLOS, Diana Mae	OP
17	ESTRAÑERO, Arielle	L
19	TIAMZON, Nicole	S
	YEE, Jerry	Head coach

== Format ==
- Preliminaries

- Single round robin preliminary

- Semifinals

- Top four teams after preliminary round will enter semifinal round
- Best-of-three series

- Finals

- Best-of-three series for the Final and Bronze matches

== Preliminary round ==
All preliminary round games of the conference will be held at the Filoil Flying V Centre, San Juan, except for the matches on June 18 which will be held at the Blue Eagle Gym, Quezon City and those on June 25 and 27 which will be at the Philsports Arena, Pasig.

Pos	Team	Pld	W	L	Pts	SW	SL	SR	SPW	SPL	SPR	Qualification
1	Philippine Air Force Spikers	7	6	1	17	18	7	2.571	572	510	1.122	Qualified for Semifinals
2	Pocari Sweat Lady Warriors	7	6	1	16	19	8	2.375	616	559	1.102	Qualified for Semifinals
3	BaliPure	7	5	2	14	18	11	1.636	647	582	1.112	Qualified for Semifinals
4	Laoag Power Smashers	7	4	3	12	13	11	1.182	550	512	1.074	Qualified for Semifinals
5	NU Bulldogs	7	3	4	12	16	13	1.231	641	596	1.076	
6	UP Fighting Maroons	7	3	4	10	12	14	0.857	581	561	1.036	
7	Iriga Lady Oragons	7	1	6	3	6	18	0.333	466	575	0.810	
8	Baguio Summer Spikers	7	0	7	0	1	21	0.048	371	549	0.676	

All times are Philippine Standard Time (UTC+08:00)

Date	Time		Score		Set 1	Set 2	Set 3	Set 4	Set 5	Total	Report
May 28	16:00	NUI	3–1	PSM	25–21	20–25	25–23	25–21		95–90	P2
May 28	18:30	POC	3–0	UPD	25–18	25–14	25–22			75–54	P2
May 30	16:00	PAF	3–1	BPU	25–23	14–25	25–19	25–16		89–83	P2
May 30	18:30	PSM	3–1	IRG	25–10	25–23	20–25	25–15		95–73	P2
June 1	16:00	IRG	3–0	BAG	25–22	25–17	26–24			76–63	P2
June 1	18:30	POC	3–2	NUI	34–32	17–25	23–25	25–17	15–11	114–110	P2
June 4	16:00	BAG	0–3	PAF	15–25	19–25	18–25			52–75	P2
June 4	18:30	PSM	0–3	POC	21–25	16–25	17–25			54–75	P2
June 6	16:00	PAF	3–0	UPD	27–25	25–19	25–17			77–61	P2
June 6	18:30	NUI	2–3	BPU	25–18	18–25	25–19	19–25	13–15	100–102	P2
June 8	16:00	BPU	3–1	IRG	18–25	25–18	25–13	25–21		93–77	P2
June 8	18:30	UPD	3–1	BAG	21–25	27–25	25–14	25–13		98–77	P2
June 11	16:00	BAG	0–3	POC	18–25	17–25	15–25			50–75	P2
June 11	18:30	PSM	3–0	PAF	25–14	25–23	25–23			75–60	P2
June 13	16:00	IRG	0–3	NUI	15–25	16–25	18–25			49–75	P2
June 13	18:30	UPD	2–3	BPU	25–20	22–25	25–15	17–25	12–15	101–100	P2
June 15	16:00	BPU	3–0	PSM	28–26	25–23	25–17			78–66	P2
June 15	18:30	NUI	2–3	PAF	25–23	21–25	25–13	23–25	8–15	102–101	P2
June 18	16:00	POC	3–1	IRG	25–16	25–18	24–26	25–20		99–80	P2
June 18	18:30	PSM	3–0	BAG	25–18	25–10	25–11			75–39	P2
June 20	16:00	IRG	0–3	UPD	17–25	17–25	19–25			53–75	P2
June 20	18:30	BAG	0–3	NUI	10–25	19–25	11–25			40–75	P2
June 22	16:00	BPU	3–0	BAG	25–18	25–14	25–18			75–50	P2
June 22	18:30	PAF	3–0	IRG	15–23	25–17	25–18			65–58	P2
June 25	16:00	NUI	1–3	UPD	22–25	27–25	13–25	22–25		84–100	P2
June 25	18:30	POC	3–2	BPU	21–25	6–25	26–24	27–25	19–17	99–116	P2
June 27	16:00	UPD	1–3	PSM	21–25	25–19	22–25	24–26		92–95	P2
June 27	18:30	PAF	3–1	POC	20–25	25–17	25–22	25–15		95–79	P2

== Playoff round ==
- Ranking is based from the preliminary round.

Semifinals
1	Philippine Air Force	3	3
4	Laoag	0	2
2	Pocari Sweat	0	3	3
3	Bali Pure	3	2	1

Finals
1	Philippine Air Force	3	1	1
2	Pocari Sweat	2	3	3
3rd place
3	Bali Pure	3	3
4	Laoag	2	1

=== Semifinals ===
==== Rank 1 vs Rank 4 ====
Date	Time		Score		Set 1	Set 2	Set 3	Set 4	Set 5	Total	Report
29 Jun	16:00	PSM	0–3	PAF	20–25	24–26	24–26			68–77	P2
2 Jul	16:00	PAF	3–2	PSM	25–14	25–20	19–25	21–25	15–10	105–94	P2

==== Rank 2 vs Rank 3 ====
Date	Time		Score		Set 1	Set 2	Set 3	Set 4	Set 5	Total	Report
29 Jun	18:30	POC	0–3	BPU	20–25	19–25	24–26			63–76	P2
2 Jul	18:30	BPU	2–3	POC	23–25	25–13	23–25	25–21	8–15	104–99	P2
4 Jul	18:00	POC	3–1	BPU	15–25	10–25	25–11	22-25		72–61	P2

=== Bronze match ===
Date	Time		Score		Set 1	Set 2	Set 3	Set 4	Set 5	Total	Report
13 Jul	16:00	BPU	3–2	PSM	23–25	25–21	25–21	19–25	15–11	107–103	P2
16 Jul	16:00	PSM	1–3	BPU	27–25	22–25	23–25	19–25		91–100	P2

=== Finals ===
Date	Time		Score		Set 1	Set 2	Set 3	Set 4	Set 5	Total	Report
13 Jul	18:30	PAF	3–2	POC	17–25	25–20	15–25	26–24	15–11	98–105	P2
16 Jul	18:30	POC	3–1	PAF	17–25	25–22	25–14	25–20		92–81	P2
18 Jul	18:00	PAF	1–3	POC	27–29	25–18	21–25	19–25		92–97	P2

== Awards ==
- Most valuable player (Finals)
  - Myla Pablo (Pocari Sweat)
- Most valuable player (Conference)
  - Grethcel Soltones (Bali Pure)
- Best setter
  - Wendy Semana (Air Force)
- Best outside spikers
  - Alyssa Valdez (BaliPure)
  - Myla Pablo (Pocari Sweat)
- Best middle blockers
  - Jaja Santiago (NU)
  - Kathy Bersola (UP)
- Best opposite spiker
  - Michele Gumabao (Pocari Sweat)
- Best libero
  - Melissa Gohing (Pocari Sweat)

== See also ==
- Spikers' Turf 2nd Season Open Conference
- 2016 PSL All-Filipino Conference
