= Grethcel Soltones =

Filipino volleyball player

Personal information
- Nickname: Gretch
- Nationality: Filipino
- Born: September 9, 1995 (age 31)
- Hometown: Catmon, Cebu, Philippines
- Height: 173 cm (5 ft 8 in)
- Weight: 68 kg (150 lb)
- Spike: 275 cm (108 in)
- Block: 276 cm (109 in)
- Education: San Sebastian College-Recoletos

Volleyball information
- Position: Outside hitter/Libero
- Current club: Akari Chargers

Career
Years	Teams
2015	PLDT
2016	BaliPure
2017	Foton
2017	BaliPure
2017	Iriga
2018	PayMaya
2018–2019	Smart/PLDT
2020–2024	Petro Gazz
2024–present	Akari

National team
2015–2019	Philippines
Honours
Women's volleyball
Representing Philippines
ASEAN Grand Prix
Bronze medal – third place	2019 Santa Rosa	Team
- Last updated: October 2017

Grethcel Soltones (sometimes misspelled as Gretchel Soltones, born September 9, 1995) is a Filipina professional volleyball player for the Akari Chargers in the Premier Volleyball League (PVL).

== Early life ==
Grethcel Soltones was born and raised in Catmon, Cebu.

== Career ==
Soltones played for San Sebastian Lady Stags in the National Collegiate Athletic Association (NCAA) women's volleyball tournament and was named Most Valuable Player for during the NCAA Season 90, 91 and 92,. being also selected First Best Outside Spiker in the Season 92.

She also played for the PLDT Home Ultera Ultra Fast Hitters and the Bali Pure Purest Water Defenders in the Shakey's V-League, where she was crowned the conference MVP during the 13th Season Open Conference.

She was a one-time national team player, who represented the Philippines in the 2015 Asian U23 Women’s Volleyball Championship and the 2015 Southeast Asian Games.

On February 25, 2017, San Sebastian Lady Stags coach Roger Gorayeb broke the news that Soltones and fellow Lady Stag player Villegas agreed to play for Foton Tornadoes.

On 2018, Soltones suited-up again for the Philippine women's volleyball team that competed in the 2018 Asian Women's Volleyball Cup held at Nakhon Ratchasima, Thailand.

== Filmography ==
=== Television ===
Year	Title	Network	Role	Notes
2022	NCAA Season 97 volleyball tournaments	GTV	Analyst	

== Awards ==
=== Individuals ===
- 2014 NCAA Season 90 "Most valuable player"
- 2015 NCAA Season 91 "Best scorer"
- 2015 NCAA Season 91 "Most valuable player"
- 2016 NCAA Season 92 "Most valuable player"
- 2016 NCAA Season 92 "1st Best Outside Spiker"
- 2014 NCAA Season 91 "Beach Volleyball Champion & MVP"
- 2015 NCAA Season 91 "Beach Volleyball Champion & MVP”
- 2016 NCAA Season 91 "Beach Volleyball Champion & MVP”
- 2017 NCAA Season 91 "Beach Volleyball Champion & MVP"
- 2016 Shakey's V-League Open Conference "Conference Most Valuable Player"
- 2017 Premier Volleyball League Reinforced Conference "2nd Best Outside Spiker"
- 2017 Premier Volleyball League Open Conference "Finals Most Valuable Player"
- 2017 Premier Volleyball League Open Conference "2nd Best Outside Spiker"
- 2022 Premier Volleyball League Open Conference "2nd Best Outside Spiker"
- 2024 Premier Volleyball League Reinforced Conference "2nd Best Outside Spiker"
