= Vietsovpetro =

Vietnamese petroleum enterprise

Joint Venture "Vietsovpetro"
- Trade name: VIETSOVPETRO
- Native name: Liên doanh Việt – Nga Vietsovpetro
- Formerly: Joint Soviet-Vietnamese Oil & Gas Enterprise «Vietsovpetro»
- Company type: Joint venture
- Industry: Petroleum industry
- Founded: 1981
- Headquarters: Vung Tau, Vietnam
- Products: Crude oil, natural gas
- Production output: 3.1 million tonnes of crude oil, 0.91 billion cubic metres of natural gas (2021)
- Revenue: Over US$1.68bn (2021)
- Parent: Petrovietnam (51%); Zarubezhneft (49%)
- Website: www.vietsov.com.vn

The Russia-Vietnam Joint Venture – Vietsovpetro (VSP;Vietnamese: Liên doanh Việt – Nga Vietsovpetro, lit. 'Viet-Russo Joint venture Vietsovpetro',Russian: Совместное российско-вьетнамское предприятие «Вьетсовпетро», romanized: Sovmestnoye rossiysko-v'yetnamskoye predpriyatiye «V'yetsovpetro», lit. 'Joint Russian-Vietnamese venture «Vietsovpetro»') is a joint Russo-Vietnamese enterprise for oil and gas exploration headquartered in Vung Tau, Vietnam. According to the VNR500 (Top 500) ranking, Vietsovpetro was Vietnam's 8th largest company.

It was established in 1981 under an inter-governmental agreement between the JSC Zarubezhneft of the Soviet Union (later inherited by the Russian Federation) and Vietnam's state-owned Petrovietnam, with each side holding half of stake.

On 10 December 2010, VietsovPetro agreed to extend its cooperation with JSC Zarubezhneft for 20 years until 2030. As per the new arrangement, PetroVietnam will hold a 51% stake in the joint venture with the Russian company holding 49%.

== See also ==
- List of oil exploration and production companies in Asia
