= Tatan Pantone =

Filipino volleyball player (born 1988)

Personal information
- Full name: Lizlee Ann Gata-Pantone
- Nickname: Tatan
- Nationality: Filipino
- Born: 17 August 1988 (age 38)
- Hometown: Sorsogon, Philippines
- Height: 168 cm (5 ft 6 in)
- Weight: 51 kg (112 lb)
- Education: Adamson University

Volleyball information
- Position: Libero
- Current club: Retired

Career
Years	Teams
2014–2016	PLDT
2017	BaliPure
2018	PayMaya
2019	PLDT Home Fibr Power Hitters

National team
2013–2015	Philippines

Lizlee Ann "Tatan" Gata-Pantone (born 17 August 1988) is a retired Filipino volleyball player who last played for PLDT Home Fibr Power Hitters of the 2019 PSL Grand Prix Conference.

She was a member of the collegiate varsity volleyball team of Adamson University in both indoor and beach volleyball. She played for PLDT Home Ultera Ultra Fast Hitters where she helped the team in winning multiple championships. Pantone was also a member of Philippines national team. She holds the record in the UAAP with the most number of digs and receptions in a single game tallying 77 excellent digs and 63 excellent receptions.

== Career ==
Gata-Pantone studied at Adamson University. She was dubbed as the Legendary Libero. During her collegiate years, she received multiple awards such as Best Digger and Best Receiver in the UAAP Volleyball Championship and Most Valuable Player in the UAAP Beach Volleyball Championship.

Gata-Pantone played the 2013 Asian Championship with her national team.

She won the Filipino competition 2016 MVP Olympics in the volleyball tournament with PLDT Home Ultera Ultra Fast Hitters. She signed with BaliPure Purest Water Defenders for the 2017 Premier Volleyball League 1st Season Reinforced Open Conference.

In 2021, PLDT Home Fibr Hitters coach, Roger Gorayeb, confirmed that Pantone retired from volleyball.

== Awards ==
=== Individuals ===
- Shakey's V-League Season 4 Second Conference "Best Digger"
- Shakey's V-League Season 5 First Conference "Best Digger"
- Shakey's V-League Season 5 Second Conference "Best Digger"
- Shakey's V-League Season 6 First Conference "Best Digger"
- Shakey's V-League Season 6 Second Conference "Best Receiver"
- Shakey's V-League Season 7 First Conference "Best Digger"
- UAAP Season 70 "Best Digger"
- UAAP Season 71 "Best Digger"
- UAAP Season 72 Beach Volleyball "Most Valuable Player"
- UAAP Season 73 Beach Volleyball "Most Valuable Player"
- UAAP Season 72 "Best Digger"
- UAAP Season 72 "Best Receiver"
- 2014 PSL All-Filipino Conference "Best Libero"
- Shakey's V-League 11th Season Open Conference "Best Receiver"
- Shakey's V-League 11th Season Reinforced Open Conference "Best Digger"
- Shakey's V-League 12th Season Reinforced Open Conference "Best Libero"
- 2018 Premier Volleyball League Reinforced Conference "Best Libero"

=== Collegiate ===
- Shakey's V-League Season 5 First Conference – Champion, with Adamson Lady Falcons
- Shakey's V-League Season 6 First Conference – Bronze medal, with Adamson Lady Falcons
- Shakey's V-League Season 6 Second Conference – Silver medal, with Adamson Lady Falcons
- UAAP Season 72 Beach Volleyball Tournament – Champion, with Adamson Lady Falcons
- Shakey's V-League Season 7 First Conference – Champion, with Adamson Lady Falcons
- UAAP Season 70 volleyball tournaments – Silver medal, with Adamson Lady Falcons

=== Clubs ===
- 2013 PSL Grand Prix – Bronze medal, with PLDT myDSL Speed Boosters
- 2014 PSL All-Filipino Conference – Bronze medal, with PLDT Home TVolution Power Attackers
- 2014 Shakey's V-League 11th Season Open Conference – Bronze medal, with PLDT Home Telpad Turbo Boosters
- 2014 Shakey's V-League 11th Season Reinforced Open Conference – Bronze medal, with PLDT Home Telpad Turbo Boosters
- 2015 Shakey's V-League 12th Season Open Conference – Champions, with PLDT Home Ultera Ultra Fast Hitters
- 2015 Shakey's V-League 12th Season Reinforced Open Conference – Champions, with PLDT Home Ultera Ultra Fast Hitters
- 2017 Premier Volleyball League 1st Season Reinforced Open Conference – Silver medal, with BaliPure Purest Water Defenders
- 2017 Premier Volleyball League 1st Season Open Conference – Champions, with BaliPure Purest Water Defenders
- 2018 Premier Volleyball League Reinforced Conference – Silver medal, with PayMaya Highflyers
