= Bang Pineda =

Filipino volleyball athlete (born 1991)

Personal information
- Nickname: Bang
- Nationality: Filipino
- Born: Shiela Marie Pineda; January 21, 1991 (age 35); Metro Manila, Philippines
- Height: 5 ft 6 in (1.68 m)
- Weight: 65 kg (143 lb)
- Education: Adamson University

Volleyball information
- Position: Libero

Career
Years	Teams
2014–2015	Cagayan Valley Lady Rising Suns
2015	Kia Forte
2016–2017	Petron Blaze Spikers
2018	Generika-Ayala Lifesavers
2019	United VC
2019	Choco Mucho Flying Titans
2020–2021	Sta. Lucia Lady Realtors
2022	Petro Gazz Angels
2023–2025	Akari Chargers
2025	Petro Gazz Angels
2026–present	Nxled Chameleons

Shiela Marie "Bang" Pineda (born January 21, 1991) is a Filipina professional volleyball player for the Nxled Chameleons of the Premier Volleyball League (PVL).

== Career ==
Pineda played for Adamson Lady Falcons during the UAAP Season 75 being named Best Server and the UAAP Season 76. She then played for Cagayan Valley Lady Rising Suns in the 11th Season Open Conference being named Best Digger and 12th Season Reinforced Open Conference before joining Petron Tri-Activ Spikers.

In the 2017 season of the Philippine SuperLiga, Pineda and teammate Frances Molina of Petron XCS won the bronze medal in the Beach Challenge Cup. Petron Blaze Spikers swept the F2 Logistics Cargo Movers in the All-Filipino Conference finals and won the championship. For the Grand Prix conference, her team placed second against their same opponent in the All-Filipino conference.

== Personal life ==
Pineda has been in a relationship with volleyball player Ara Galang.

== Awards ==
=== Individual ===
- 2012-13 UAAP Season 75 Indoor Volleyball "Best Server"
- 2013-14 UAAP Season 76 Beach Volleyball "MVP"
- 2014 Shakey's V-League Open Conference "Best Digger"

=== Clubs ===
- 2013 UAAP Beach Volleyball championships – Champion with Adamson Lady Falcons
- 2013 Shakey's V-League 2nd Conference – Champion with Cagayan Valley Lady Rising Suns
- 2014 Shakey's V-League 1st Conference – Third place with Adamson Lady Falcons
- 2014 Shakey's V-League Open Conference – Runner-up with Cagayan Valley Lady Rising Suns
- 2014 Shakey's V-League 11th Season Reinforced Conference – Champion with Cagayan Valley Lady Rising Suns
- 2014 PSL Grand Prix Conference – Champion, with Petron Blaze Spikers
- 2015 PSL All-Filipino Conference – Champion, with Petron Blaze Spikers
- 2017 PSL Beach Volleyball Challenge Cup – Third place, with Petron XCS
- 2017 PSL All-Filipino Conference – Champion with Petron Blaze Spikers
- 2017 Philippine SuperLiga Grand Prix – Runner-up with Petron Blaze Spikers
- 2022 Premier Volleyball League Open Conference – Runner-up with Petro Gazz Angels
- 2022 Premier Volleyball League Reinforced Conference – Champions with Petro Gazz Angels
