= PNP Lady Patrollers =

- Full name: PNP Lady Patrollers
- Short name: PNP
- Nickname: Lady Patrollers
- Founded: 2013
- Manager: Manuel Gaerlan
- Captain: SPO3 Jennifer Mia
- League: Shakey's V-League (2013–2014)

Uniforms
Home	Away

The Philippine National Police Lady Patrollers (stylized as the P.A.T.R.O.L.ers) represent the Philippine National Police in women's volleyball. The roster consists of active-duty policewomen and civilian guest players.

== History ==
The PNP established a women's volleyball team that competed in the 2013 (10th) Shakey's V-League Open Conference Tournament held in San Juan Sports Arena. The Center for Police Strategy Management (CPSM) formed the inaugural team, designating them the 'PNP Lady Patrollers'. The PNP utilized the league's broadcast media presence to promote the 'PNP P.A.T.R.O.L. Plan 2030' (Peace and Order Agenda for Transformation and Upholding of the Rule-of-Law).

Police Chief Inspector (PCINSP) Ma. Angela M. Salaya of the Information Technology Management Service was detailed as IT Officer of The CPSM and became the Project Manager that formed the team. Then Police Senior Superintendent Manuel C. Gaerlan was tapped as the Team Manager and Bob Malenab became Team Coach.

The 10th Open Conference was composed of teams from the Philippine Navy, Philippine Air Force, Philippine Army, Meralco, Smart- Maynilad, Cagayan Valley and Far Eastern University. The team appeared in the 2014 (11th) Shakey's V-League Open Conference.

In 2017, the Lady Patrollers were composed of PO1 Karen Kay Quilario and PO1 Lourdilyn Catubag. They won the gold medal in the 2017 World Police and Fire Games, defeating competitors from Russia, Germany, Canada, and Brazil. Those Lady Patrollers were composed of PCSUPT Manuel R. Gaerlan (Team Manager) and PCINSP Ma. Angela M. Salaya (Project Manager) together with Team 2 PO1 Cassandra Ledda and PO1 Jessan Tano and Coaches SPO2 Dang Quiao and SPO2 Marilyn Mateo and Team Mentor PBGEN Noel A. Baraceros, Director, Center for Police Strategy Management.

A squad composed of players from Police Regional Office 11 competed in the 2019 World Police and Fire Games at Chengdu and placed 4th overall..

== Honors ==
=== Team ===
Season / Conference	Title
10th Season Open Conference	6th place
11th Season Open Conference	8th place
UNTV Volleyball League Season 1	Bronze
UNTV Volleyball League Season 2	Silver
UNTV Volleyball League Season 3	Champion

== Roster ==
2025 UNTV VOLLEYBALL LEAGUE

- PCpl Princess Joy A Oliveros
- PCpl Karessa D Vicente
- PCpl Kristel May E Etucas
- Pat Hanna Marie L Albeos
- Pat Jannah Kyla G Artuzuela
- Pat Entezar B Bangcola - MVP
- Pat Rexza S Limsiaco
- Pat Jeancyl S Magsino
- Pat Marilou T Padilla
- Pat Liezl R Paginado
- Pat Meriambe L Porio
- Pat Pinky S Salavante
