= 2014 Shakey's V-League Open Conference =

Shakey's V-League 11th Season 2nd Conference
Women's Finals	G1	G2	Wins
Philippine Army Lady Troopers	3	3	2
Cagayan Valley Lady Rising Suns	1	0	0
- Duration: June 29, 2014 – August 31, 2014
- Arena(s): Filoil Flying V Arena, San Juan
- Finals MVP: Conference: Rachel Daquis Finals: Jovelyn Gonzaga
- Winning coach: Sgt. Rico De Guzman
- Semifinalists: PLDT Home Telpad Turbo Boosters; Philippine Air Force Air Spikers
- TV network(s): GMA News TV (local); GMA Pinoy TV (international)

The 2014 Shakey's V-League Open Conference was the 21st conference of the Shakey's V-League and the second conference of the 2014 season. It was held between June 29, 2014, to August 31, 2014. The opening ceremonies were held on June 29, 2014, with the first doubleheader of volleyball games at the Filoil Flying V Arena in San Juan. There were eight (8) teams that competed, with the Philippine Army Lady Troopers emerging as the tournament's champion.

== Tournament Format ==
=== Preliminaries (PL) ===
Eight (8) competing teams had a Single Round-robin. Top six (6) teams qualified for the Quarterfinals.

=== Quarterfinals (QF) ===
The top six (6) teams battled for the top four (4) spots in a Single Round-robin with their scores from the preliminaries carried over, minus the ones won over the eliminated teams.

=== Semi-finals (SF) ===
The four (4) semi-finalists will compete against each other in a best-of-three series as follows: C1 vs D2 and D1 vs C2. The two (2) SF winners will compete for GOLD. The two (2) SF losers will compete for BRONZE

=== Finals ===
The battle for GOLD and the battle for BRONZE will both follow the best-of-three format, provided: If the battle for GOLD ends in two (2) matches (2-0), then there will no longer be Game 3 for either GOLD or BRONZE. If, in the case, the series for BRONZE is tied (1-1), then the tie will be resolved using FIVB rules. A tie in the series for GOLD (1-1) after Game 2 will be broken in a Game 3, regardless of the results of the series in BRONZE.

== Participating teams ==
Participating teams
Ateneo de Manila University; Lady Eagles	Philippine Army; Lady Troopers
Cagayan Valley; Lady Rising Suns	PLDT Home Telpad; Turbo Boosters
National University; Lady Bulldogs	Philippine National Police; Lady Patrollers
Philippine Air Force; Air Spikers	University of the Philippines; Lady Maroons

== Season's Line-Up (Regular Players) ==
ATENEO LADY EAGLES
No.	Player name	Position
1	PATNONGON, Aerieal	MH
2	VALDEZ, Alyssa (c)	OH
3	MORENTE, Michelle Kathleen	OP
6	LAVITORIA, Jamie Isabelle	S
7	TAN, Maria Gizelle Jessica	S
8	DE JESUS, Jorella Marie	OH
9	DERDER, Frances Karen	OH
11	GASTON, Therese Marie	OH
12	MORADO, Julia Melissa	S
13	LAZARO, Dennise Michelle	L
14	DE LEON, Isabel Beatriz	MH
16	AHOMIRO, Rongomaipapa Amy	MH
17	MADAYAG, Madeleine Yrenea	OP
18	GEQUILLANA, Kassandra Miren	OH

CAGAYAN VALLEY LADY RISING SUNS
No.	Player name	Position
1	SY, Gyzele	S
2	TABAQUERO, Maria Angeli (c)	OH
3	GILLEGO, Charlene	L
4	SORIANO, Paulina	MH
5	VARGAS, Rosemarie	OH
6	DAWIS, Leuseth	MH
7	SEGUIRRE, Gemelyn	OH
8	MAIZO-PONTILLAS, Aiza	OP
9	MARCIANO, Janine	OH
11	GUEVARA, Faye Janelle	MH
12	BENITO, Analyn Jhoy	OP
13	PINEDA, Shiela Marie	L
15	EULALIO, Wenneth	MH
17	SAET, Relea Felina	S

NU LADY BULLDOGS
No.	Player name	Position
1	VALDEZ, Gayle Rose	OH
2	PEREZ, Ivy Jisel	S
3	SANTIAGO, Alyja Daphne	MH
4	PABLO, Marites	OH
5	GENERAL, Fatima Bia	L
6	DOROMAL, Roma Joy	S
7	MANDAPAT, Rizza Jane	OP
8	NAVAL, Gilliane Faye	L
10	SOLIVEN, Jocelyn	S
11	DORIA, Roselyn	MH
12	DADANG, Siemens Desiree (c)	MH
14	SINGH, Jorelle	OH
15	ABRIAM, Klarisa	OH
17	PABLO, Myla	OH

PHILIPPINE AIR FORCE LADY RAIDERS
No.	Player name	Position
1	DIMACULANGAN, Rhea Katrina	S
2	ANDAYA, Gena	OH
3	GUSTILLO, Jill	L
4	YONGCO, Iari	OP
5	BALMACEDA, Mary Ann	L
6	PANTINO, May Ann	OH
7	SEMANA, Wendy Anne (c)	S
8	MANZANO, Jennifer	OP
9	CABALLEJO, Judy Ann	OH
10	ORTIZ, Maika Angela	MH
11	DE RAMOS, Liza	MH
12	CASES, Joy	OH
13	TAPIC, Jocemer	MH
15	DELOS SANTOS, Sandra	MH

PHILIPPINE ARMY LADY TROOPERS
No.	Player name	Position
1	SABAS, Genie	MH
2	SIATAN-TORRES, Patricia	L
3	BUNAG, Joanne	OH
5	BALSE, Mary Jean	MH
6	ALARCA, Jacqueline	MH
7	SALAK, Cristina	S
8	GONZAGA, Jovelyn	OP
9	CAROLINO, Michelle	OH
11	CRUZ, Dahlia	OP
12	IRATAY, Ma. Theresa (c)	S
13	DAQUIS, Rachel Anne	OH
14	BAUTISTA, Nerissa	OH
15	AGNO, Cristine	L
16	GONZALEZ, Sarah Jane	S

PLDT HOME TELEPAD TURBO BOOSTERS
No.	Player name	Position
1	DE LEON, Rubie	S
2	DEVANADERA, Rysabelle	MH
3	ROSES, Suzanne (c)	OP
4	AGANON, Carmina	OH
5	SOLTONES, Gretchel	OH
6	GATA-PANTONE, Lizlee Ann	L
7	ESTAMPA, Royce	MH
8	BENTING, Angela	OH
10	MARAÑO, Abigail	MH
11	LATIGAY, Laurence Ann	OH
12	FERRER, Jamenea	S
14	SORIANO, Ma. Rosario	MH
16	EROA, Alyssa	L
17	SANTIAGO, Aleona Denise	MH

PNP LADY PATROLLERS
No.	Player name	Position
1	MOLINA, Frances Xinia	
2	CONCEPTION, Ana Veronica	
3	SALIGAO, Dianne	
5	TICAR, Mary Jane Diane	S
6	CASTRO, Aidie	
7	MENDOZA, Mylene	
8	GALLANO, Mary	
9	MARTINEZ, Maricor	
10	DATUIN, Michelle (c)	MH
11	MADERAZO, Christine Jane	
12	PEREZ, Angelica Charisse	
14	GEBAÑA, Perlanie	
16	TADEO, Justyne Mae	L
17	MAGSUMBOL, Katherine	

UP LADY MAROONS
No.	Player name	Position
3	LAYUG, Alyssa Gayle	MH
4	ILUSTRE, Arienne Elise	OH
5	ARANETA, Angeli Pauline (c)	OP
6	MAGTALAS, Arylle Gimry	S
7	ORTIZ, Monica Maria	OP
8	BERSOLA, Katherine Adrielle	MH
9	ONG, Jaye Aliyah	OH
10	TIAMZON, Nicole Anne	S
11	BUITRE, Marian	MH
12	GAISER,Princess Ira	L
13	SANDOVAL, Caryl	OP
14	CALUGCUG, Julienne Marie	OH
16	LAI, Jewel Hannah	S
17	ESTRAÑERO, Maria Arielle	L

Legend
S	Setter
MH	Middle Hitter
OH	Outside Hitter
OP	Opposite Hitter
L	Libero
(c)	Team Captain

== Preliminaries ==
Pos	Team	Pld	W	L	Pts	SW	SL	SR	SPW	SPL	SPR	Qualification
1	PLDT Home Telpad Turbo Boosters	7	6	1	18	18	4	4.500	525	451	1.164	Quarterfinals
2	Philippine Army Lady Troopers	7	6	1	17	19	6	3.167	607	505	1.202	Quarterfinals
3	Cagayan Valley Lady Rising Suns	7	6	1	17	18	6	3.000	573	496	1.155	Quarterfinals
4	Philippine Air Force Air Spikers	7	4	3	11	13	11	1.182	537	518	1.037	Quarterfinals
5	NU Lady Bulldogs	7	3	4	9	10	14	0.714	541	558	0.970	Quarterfinals
6	Ateneo Lady Eagles	7	2	5	8	13	17	0.765	618	645	0.958	Quarterfinals
7	UP Lady Maroons	7	1	6	4	6	19	0.316	503	588	0.855	Eliminated
8	PNP Lady Patrollers	7	0	7	0	1	21	0.048	406	550	0.738	Eliminated

Date	Time		Score		Set 1	Set 2	Set 3	Set 4	Set 5	Total	Report
0629	14:00	NU	3–1	UP	18-25	25-19	25-22	25-23		93–0	P-2
0629	16:00	PNP	0–3	ADMU	15-25	12-25	21-25			48–0	P-2
0701	14:00	UP	0–3	ARMY	18-25	13-25	17-25			48–0	P-2
0701	16:00	AIR	3–0	PNP	25-22	25-23	25-8			75–0	P-2
0703	14:00	PNP	0–3	CAG	15-25	21-25	18-25			54–0	P-2
0703	16:00	PLDT	3–0	UP	25-15	25-21	25-21			75–0	P-2
0706	14:00	AIR	1–3	ARMY	20-25	25-23	16-25	23-25		84–0	P-2
0706	16:00	ADMU	0–3	PLDT	21-25	13-25	24-26			58–0	P-2
0708	14:00	UP	0–3	AIR	21-25	22-25	18-25			61–0	P-2
0708	16:00	PLDT	3–0	CAG	25-23	25-23	25-21			75–0	P-2
0710	14:00	ARMY	3–0	NU	25-19	25-22	25-22			75–0	P-2
0710	16:00	AIR	3–2	ADMU	22-25	25-13	25-13	23-25	17-15	112–0	P-2
0715	14:00	PLDT	3–0	PNP	25-13	25-17	25-19			75–0	P-2
0715	16:00	NU	0–3	CAG	24-26	22-25	25-27			71–0	P-2
0717	14:00	ARMY	3–0	PLDT	25-18	25-16	25-15			75–0	P-2
0717	16:00	CAG	3–0	AIR	25-13	25-22	25-20			75–0	P-2
0720	14:00	PNP	0–3	NU	23-25	16-25	18-25			57–0	P-2
0720	16:00	ADMU	3–2	UP	25-15	24-26	25-21	21-25	15-11	110–0	P-2
0722	14:00	NU	1–3	PLDT	16-25	23-25	26-24	19-25		84–0	P-2
0722	16:00	ARMY	3–0	PNP	25-16	25-22	25-22			75–0	P-2
0724	14:00	PLDT	3–0	AIR	25-15	26-24	25-22			76–0	P-2
0724	16:00	CAG	3–1	ARMY	27-25	20-25	25-23	25-22		97–0	P-2
0727	14:00	UP	0–3	CAG	15-25	19-25	16-25			50–0	P-2
0727	16:00	ADMU	1–3	NU	18-25	25-15	24-26	18-25		85–0	P-2
0729	14:00	NU	0–3	AIR	21-25	21-25	22-25			64–0	P-2
0729	16:00	ADMU	2–3	ARMY	22-25	13-25	30-28	25-20	14-16	104–0	P-2
0731	14:00	UP	3–1	PNP	25-23	24-26	25-12	26-24		100–0	P-2
0731	16:00	CAG	3–2	ADMU	16-25	25-17	25-17	25-27	15-10	106–0	P-2

== Bracket ==
Quarterfinal		W	L
1	PAR	7	3
2	PLDT	6	4
3	CAG	5	5
4	PAF	6	5
5	ADMU	5	6
6	NU	2	8

Semifinals
PAR	3	3
PAF	1	0
PLDT	1	1
CAG	3	3

Final
1	PAR	3	3
3	CAG	0	0
Bronze medal game
2	PLDT	1	3
4	PAF	3	0

== Quarterfinals ==
Pos	Team	Pld	W	L	Pts	SW	SL	SR	SPW	SPL	SPR	Qualification
1	Philippine Army Lady Troopers	10	7	3	20	25	16	1.563	940	847	1.110	Semi-finals
2	PLDT Home Telpad Turbo Boosters	10	6	4	19	21	13	1.615	776	738	1.051	Semi-finals
3	Cagayan Valley Lady Rising Suns	10	5	5	15	19	18	1.056	838	831	1.008	Semi-finals
4	Philippine Air Force Air Spikers	10	5	5	14	18	21	0.857	843	841	1.002	Semi-finals
5	Ateneo Lady Eagles	10	5	5	15	22	22	1.000	922	954	0.966	Eliminated
6	NU Lady Bulldogs	10	2	8	7	10	24	0.417	683	785	0.870	Eliminated

Date	Time		Score		Set 1	Set 2	Set 3	Set 4	Set 5	Total	Report
0803	14:00	AIR	3–1	NU	14-25	25-14	25-12	25-14		89–0	P-2
0803	16:00	PLDT	0–3	ADMU	18-25	21-25	26-28			65–0	P-2
0805	14:00	NU	0–3	PLDT	13-25	20-25	19-25			52–0	P-2
0805	16:00	ARMY	1–3	AIR	25-20	19-25	19-25	22-25		85–0	P-2
0807	14:00	CAG	1–3	ARMY	22-25	15-25	25-22	16-25		78–0	P-2
0807	16:00	AIR	2–3	ADMU	21-25	25-22	25-17	19-25	9-15	99–0	P-2
0810	14:00	PLDT	2–3	AIR	21-25	25-22	25-17	26-28	8-15	105–0	P-2
0810	16:00	NU	2–3	ARMY	25-22	25-19	21-25	14-25	7-15	92–0	P-2
0810	18:00	ADMU	3–1	CAG	17-25	25-23	27-25	25-19		94–0	P-2
0812	14:00	CAG	2–3	NU	25-23	25-18	16-25	22-25	14-16	102–0	P-2
0812	16:00	ARMY	2–3	ADMU	19-25	25-19	25-21	21-25	14-16	104–0	P-2
0814	14:00	PLDT	3–0	CAG	25-22	25-21	25-22			75–0	P-2
0814	16:00	ADMU	3–2	NU	26-28	25-19	16-25	25-16	15-7	107–0	P-2
0817	14:00	CAG	3–0	AIR	28-26	25-20	25-20			78–0	P-2
0817	16:00	ARMY	3–1	PLDT	15-25	25-17	26-24	25-15		91–0	P-2

=== Play-off ===
Date	Time		Score		Set 1	Set 2	Set 3	Set 4	Set 5	Total	Report
0819	16:00	AIR	3–0	ADMU	25-20	25-22	25-22			75–0	

== Semi-finals ==
=== Rank 1 vs Rank 4 ===
August 21; 14:00	Philippine Army Lady Troopers	3–1	Philippine Air Force Air Spikers	Filoil Flying V Arena; Attendance: 782; Referees: BONGKINGKI Danilo (NR); GAA Efren (IR)
August 21; 14:00	(24–26, 25–19, 25–20, 25–19); P-2			Filoil Flying V Arena; Attendance: 782; Referees: BONGKINGKI Danilo (NR); GAA Efren (IR)

August 24; 16:00	Philippine Army Lady Troopers	3–0	Philippine Air Force Air Spikers	Filoil Flying V Arena; Attendance: 1,351; Referees: ROJAS Rodrigo (NR); SISON Philip (IR)
August 24; 16:00	(25–11, 25–20, 25–22); P-2			Filoil Flying V Arena; Attendance: 1,351; Referees: ROJAS Rodrigo (NR); SISON Philip (IR)

=== Rank 2 vs Rank 3 ===
August 21; 16:00	PLDT Home Telpad Turbo Boosters	1–3	Cagayan Valley Lady Rising Suns	Filoil Flying V Arena; Attendance: 831; Referees: SISON Philip (IR); ROJAS Rodrigo (NR)
August 21; 16:00	(11–25, 25–16, 14–25, 20–25); P-2			Filoil Flying V Arena; Attendance: 831; Referees: SISON Philip (IR); ROJAS Rodrigo (NR)

August 24; 14:00	PLDT Home Telpad Turbo Boosters	1–3	Cagayan Valley Lady Rising Suns	Filoil Flying V Arena; Attendance: 891; Referees: GAA Efren (IR); BONGKINGKI Danilo (NR)
August 24; 14:00	(20–25, 25–12, 19–25, 24–26); P-2			Filoil Flying V Arena; Attendance: 891; Referees: GAA Efren (IR); BONGKINGKI Danilo (NR)

== Finals ==
=== Battle for Bronze ===
August 28; 14:00	PLDT Home Telpad Turbo Boosters	1–3	Philippine Air Force Air Spikers	Filoil Flying V Arena; Attendance: 814; Referees: ROJAS Rodrigo (NR); MALAZARTE Dante (NR)
August 28; 14:00	(25–16, 23–25, 19–25, 12–25); P2			Filoil Flying V Arena; Attendance: 814; Referees: ROJAS Rodrigo (NR); MALAZARTE Dante (NR)

August 31; 14:00	PLDT Home Telpad Turbo Boosters	3–0	Philippine Air Force Air Spikers	Filoil Flying V Arena; Attendance: 2,367; Referees: MALAZARTE Dante (NR); CASILLAN Rolando (NR)
August 31; 14:00	(25–18, 25–23, 25–15); P2			Filoil Flying V Arena; Attendance: 2,367; Referees: MALAZARTE Dante (NR); CASILLAN Rolando (NR)

=== Battle for Gold ===
August 28; 16:00	Cagayan Valley Lady Rising Suns	1–3	Philippine Army Lady Troopers	Filoil Flying V Arena; Attendance: 1,047; Referees: VILLAREAL Jess (NR); GAA Efren (IR)
August 28; 16:00	(19–25, 25–18, 18–25, 5–25); P2			Filoil Flying V Arena; Attendance: 1,047; Referees: VILLAREAL Jess (NR); GAA Efren (IR)

August 31; 16:00	Cagayan Valley Lady Rising Suns	0–3	Philippine Army Lady Troopers	Filoil Flying V Arena; Attendance: 2,779; Referees: SISON Philip (IR); ROJAS Rodrigo (NR)
August 31; 16:00	(14–25, 7–25, 23–25); P2			Filoil Flying V Arena; Attendance: 2,779; Referees: SISON Philip (IR); ROJAS Rodrigo (NR)

== Final standings ==
Rank	Team
1st place, gold medalist(s)	Philippine Army Lady Trooper
2nd place, silver medalist(s)	Cagayan Valley Lady Rising Sun
3rd place, bronze medalist(s)	PLDT Home Telpad Turbo Boosters
4	Philippine Air Force Air Spikers
5	Ateneo Lady Eagles
6	NU Lady Bulldogs
7	UP Lady Maroons
8	PNP Lady Patrollers

Shakey's V-League 11th Season Open Conference Champions

2nd title

Team roster
Genie Sabas, Patricia Siatan-Torres, Joanne Bunag, Mary Jean Balse, Jacqueline Alarca, (c) Tina Salak, Jovelyn Gonzaga, Michelle Carolino, Dahlia Cruz, Rachel Daquis, Nerissa Bautista, Christine Agno, Sarah Jane Gonzales

Head coach
Sgt. Rico De Guzman

== Individual awards ==
- Most valuable player
  - Conference: Rachel Daquis (PAR)
  - Finals: Jovelyn Gonzaga (PAR)
- Best scorer: Alyssa Valdez (ADMU)
- Best attacker: Jaja Santiago (NU)
- Best blocker: Maika Angela Ortiz (PAF)
- Best server: Rachel Daquis (PAR)
- Best digger: Shiela Marie Pineda (CAG)
- Best setter: Rhea Dimaculangan (PAF)
- Best receiver: Lizlee Ann Gata-Pantone (PLDT)
