= PLDT women's volleyball team (2013–2018) =

Professional women's volleyball team

PLDT
- Founded: 2013
- Dissolved: 2018
- History: PLDT myDSL Speed Boosters; 2013; PLDT Home TVolution Power Attackers; 2014; PLDT Home Telpad Turbo Boosters; 2014; PLDT Home Ultera Ultra Fast Hitters; 2015; PayMaya High Flyers; 2018
- League: Philippine Super Liga (2013–2014); Premier Volleyball League (2014, 2018)
- Championships: Shakey's V-League : 2 (2015, 2015)

The PLDT myDSL Speed Boosters, later known as the PayMaya High Flyers, was a women's volleyball team owned and operated by PLDT. The team competed from 2013 to 2015, and again in 2018, under various names reflecting PLDT's internet service brands, with the PayMaya name being an exception in its final season. The team was merged with the Smart Prepaid Giga Hitters in 2018, forming PLDT's current team, now known as the PLDT High Speed Hitters.

The team also had a men's counterpart during its entire existence, even sharing the same name from 2013 to 2015.

== History ==
The PayMaya High Flyers debuted in 2013 as the PLDT myDSL Speed Boosters women's team in the Philippine Superliga (PSL) during the 2013 Invitational Conference. A men's team debuted in the following conference.

In 2014, while participating in the PSL, the club joined in the Shakey's V-League with its women's team as the PLDT Home Telpad Turbo Boosters during the 2014 Open Conference.

The club ended its participation in the PSL after the 2014 season. In 2015, the club competed under the name PLDT Home Ultera Ultra Fast Hitters. becoming its first champion.

The club became dormant in 2016 and 2017. The women's team returned to active competition in 2018 in the Premier Volleyball League (formerly, Shakey's V-League and Spikers’ Turf) as the PayMaya High Flyers, named after PLDT's PayMaya service. The men's team retained the PLDT brand and competed as the PLDT Home Fibr Ultra Fast Hitters.

In September 2018, the women's team was merged with the Smart Prepaid Giga Hitters, its affiliate team in the PSL.

== Final roster ==
=== Premier Volleyball League ===
PayMaya High Flyers
No.	Player	Position	Height	Birth date
2	(United States) Shelby Hollowell Sullivan	Middle blocker	1.88 m (6 ft 2 in)	April 3, 1994 (age 32)
3	(United States) Tess Nicole Rountree	Outside hitter	1.88 m (6 ft 2 in)	August 14, 1993 (age 33)
5	(Philippines) Grethcel Soltones	Outside hitter	1.73 m (5 ft 8 in)	September 5, 1995 (age 31)
6	(Philippines) Lizlee Ann Gata-Pantone	Libero	1.68 m (5 ft 6 in)	August 17, 1988 (age 38)
7	(Philippines) Czarina Grace Carandang	Middle blocker	1.78 m (5 ft 10 in)	November 26, 1997 (age 28)
8	(Philippines) Gel Cayuna	Setter	1.70 m (5 ft 7 in)	August 17, 1998 (age 28)
9	(Philippines) Aiko Sweet Urdas	Opposite	1.78 m (5 ft 10 in)	February 23, 1996 (age 30)
10	(Philippines) Jasmine Nabor (c)	Setter	1.75 m (5 ft 9 in)	July 11, 1998 (age 28)
12	(Philippines) Katherine Villegas	Middle blocker	1.75 m (5 ft 9 in)	April 30, 1995 (age 31)
13	(Philippines) Celine Elaiza Domingo	Middle blocker	1.78 m (5 ft 10 in)	April 20, 1999 (age 27)
14	(Philippines) Jorelle Singh	Outside hitter	1.68 m (5 ft 6 in)	December 14, 1995 (age 30)
15	(Philippines) (United States) Jerrili Malabanan	Opposite	1.78 m (5 ft 10 in)	June 17, 1995 (age 31)
16	(Philippines) Alyssa Eroa	Libero	1.51 m (4 ft 11 in)	June 9, 1996 (age 30)
18	(Philippines) Joyce Sta. Rita	Middle blocker	1.78 m (5 ft 10 in)	February 10, 1998 (age 28)

Coaching staff

- Head coach:
  Roger Gorayeb
- Assistant coaches:
  Clint Malazo

Team Staff

- Team Manager:
  Jamil Fabia
- Trainer:
  Neil Fred Are

Medical Staff

- Team Physician:
- Physical Therapist:
  Raymond Pili

== Honors ==
=== Team ===
Philippine SuperLiga:

Season	Conference	Title	Source
2013	Invitational	5th Place	
2013	Grand Prix	3rd Place	
2014	All-Filipino	3rd Place	
2014	Grand Prix	(did not compete)	

Premier Volleyball League:

Season	Conference	Title	Source
2014	Open	3rd place	
2014	Reinforced	3rd place	
2015	Open	Champion	
2015	Reinforced	Champion	
2016	Open	(did not compete)	
2016	Reinforced	(did not compete)	
2017	Reinforced	(did not compete)	
2017	Open	(did not compete)	
2018	Reinforced	Runner-up	
2018	Open	(did not compete)	

Others:

Season	Tournament	Title	Source
2016	MVP Olympics	Champion	

=== Individual ===
Premier Volleyball League:

Season	Conference	Award	'Name	Source
2014	Reinforced	Best Setter	(Philippines) Rubie de Leon	
2015	Open	Finals MVP	(Philippines) Jaja Santiago	
2015	Open	Conference MVP	(Philippines) Alyssa Valdez	
2015	Open	1st Best Outside Spiker	(Philippines) Alyssa Valdez	
2015	Open	2nd Best Middle Blocker	(Philippines) Jaja Santiago	
2015	Open	Best Setter	(Philippines) Rubie de Leon	
2015	Reinforced	Finals MVP	(Philippines) Alyssa Valdez	
2015	Reinforced	2nd Best Outside Spiker	(Philippines) Janine Marciano	
2015	Reinforced	Best Libero	(Philippines) Tatan Pantone	
2018	Reinforced	Best Libero	(Philippines) Tatan Pantone	
2018	Reinforced	Best Foreign Guest Player	(United States) Tess Nicole Rountree	

Philippine SuperLiga:

Season	Conference	Award	Name	Source
2013	Invitational	Best Scorer	(Philippines) Pau Soriano	
2013	Grand Prix	Best Setter	(United States) Kaylee Manns	
2013	Grand Prix	Best Opposite Spiker	(Philippines) Sue Roces	
2013	Grand Prix	Best Middle Blocker	(United States) Savannah Noyes	
2014	All-Filipino	Best Libero	(Philippines) Tatan Pantone	
2014	All-Filipino	Best Opposite Spiker	(Philippines) Sue Roces	

== Team captains ==
- (Philippines) Lou Ann Latigay (2013)
- (Philippines) Sue Roces (2014–2015)
- (Philippines) Jasmine Nabor (2018)

== Head coach ==
- Roger Gorayeb
