= 2014 Shakey's V-League Reinforced Open Conference =

Shakey's V-League 11th Season 3rd Conference
Men's Finals	G1	G2	G3	Wins
Instituto Estetico Manila	2	3	3	2
Systema	3	2	2	1
- Duration: October 5, 2014 - November 16, 2014
- Arena(s): Filoil Flying V Arena, San Juan
- Finals MVP: Jeffrey Jimenez (IEM)
- Winning coach: Ernesto Balubar (IEM)
- Semifinalists: FEU; RTU
- TV network(s): GMA News TV (local); GMA Pinoy TV (international)
Women's Finals	G1	G2	Wins
Philippine Army	1	2	0
Cagayan Valley	3	3	2
- Duration: October 5, 2014 - November 9, 2014
- Arena(s): Filoil Flying V Arena, San Juan
- Finals MVP: Aiza Maizo-Pontillas (CAG)
- Winning coach: Ernesto Pamilar (CAG)
- Semifinalists: PLDT; Meralco
- TV network(s): GMA News TV (local); GMA Pinoy TV (international)

The 2014 Shakey's V-League Reinforced Open Conference was the 22nd conference of the Shakey's V-League and the third and final conference of the 2014 season. It began on October 5, 2014. It was also the first and only conference in which the SVL held a men's division, which later led to the establishment of Spikers' Turf.

The Cagayan Valley Lady Rising Suns beat the Philippine Army Lady Troopers in two games. In the inaugural men's division, Instituto Estetico Manila Phoenix Volley Masters defeated Systema Active Smashers in 3 games.

== Tournament format ==
=== Preliminaries ===
Four (4) competing teams in both men's and women's division in a double round robin format.

=== Finals ===
Rank 1 team battles Rank 2 team for GOLD, and Rank 3 team battles Rank 4 team for BRONZE. The battle for GOLD and the battle for BRONZE will both follow the best-of-three format, provided: If the battle for GOLD ends in two (2) matches (2-0), then there will no longer be Game 3 for either GOLD or BRONZE. If, in the case, the series for BRONZE is tied (1-1), then the tie will be resolved using FIVB rules. A tie in the series for GOLD (1-1) after Game 2 will be broken in a Game 3, regardless of the results of the series in BRONZE.

== Exhibition Match ==
=== Line up ===
Legend
S	Setter
MH	Middle Blocker
OH	Outside Hitter
OP	Opposite Hitter
L	Libero
(c)	Team Captain

Philippines Girls Under-17 Team
No.	Player name	Position
1	BARROGA, Gyra	OH
3	DIOLAN, Rica (c)	S
4	DOROG, Justine	OH
5	FRANCISCO, Christine Dianne	MB
7	LAURE, Ejiya	OP/S
8	LAYUG, Maristela	MB
9	MAGALLANES, Kristine	L
10	MAGSARILE, Nicole	OH
12	MOLDE, Issa	OH
13	NABOR, Jasmine	MB
14	NISPEROS, Faith	MB
15	ROSIER, Rosalinda	OH
17	TEOPE, Alysa	S
18	VIRAY, Caitlin	S

FEU Lady Tamaraws
No.	Player name	Position
2	PONS, Bernadette	OH
3	SIMBORIO, Charm	S/OP
4	NEGRITO, Kyle	S
6	DIONELA, Joanne	L
7	CASUGOD, Geneveve	MB
8	DAWSON, Samantha	OH
9	PALMA, Remy	MB
10	PAPA, Yna (c)	S
11	ATIENZA, Kyla	L
13	GUINO, Healther	OH
14	AMARO, Rizalie	
15	MALABANAN, Jemili	MB
16	BASAS, Chin	OH

=== Matches ===
Date	Time		Score		Set 1	Set 2	Set 3	Set 4	Set 5	Total	Report
Oct 05	14:00	RPG U-17	0–3	FEU Lady Tamaraws	15–25	23–25	23–25			61–75	
Oct 07	14:00	RPG U-17	1–3	NU Lady Bulldogs	19–25	16–25	26–24	21–25		82–99	

== Women's Division ==
=== Participating teams ===
Participating teams
Philippine Army Lady Troopers	Cagayan Valley Lady Rising Suns
Meralco Power Spikers	PLDT Home Telpad Turbo Boosters

=== Season's Line-Up ===
Legend
S	Setter
MH	Middle Blocker
OH	Outside Hitter
OP	Opposite Hitter
L	Libero
(c)	Team Captain

CAGAYAN VALLEY LADY RISING SUNS
No.	Player name	Position
1	SY, Gyzele	S
2	TABAQUERO, Ma. Angeli (c)	OH
3	GILLEGO, Charlene	L
4	SORIANO, Ma. Paulina	MB
5	VARGAS, Rosemarie	OH
8	MAIZO-PONTILLAS, Aiza	OP
9	MARCIANO, Janine	OH
12	BENITO, Analyn Joy	S/OH
13	PINEDA, Shiela Marie	L
15	EULALIO, Wenneth	MB
17	SAET, Relea Ferina	S
11	(FG) HYAPHA, Amporn	MB
14	(FG) SAENGMUANG, Patcharee	OS

MERALCO POWER SPIKERS
No.	Player name	Position
2	MARAÑO, Abigail	MB
3	DE GUZMAN, Ma. Conception	OH
4	MERCADO, Stephanie	OH
8	VELEZ, Zharmaine	MB
9	HERNANDEZ, Celine Anne	OP
10	PENETRANTE-OUANO, Maureen (c)	MB
11	QUEMADA, LC Girly	OH/Defense Specialist
12	REYES, Jennylyn	L
13	MORADA, Maica	OP
17	HINGPIT, April Ross	S
1	(FG) TANYAMA, Misao	S
16	(FG) KOTRUANG, Wanida	OH

PHILIPPINE ARMY LADY TROOPERS
No.	Player name	Position
1	SABAS, Genie	MB
2	SIATAN-TORRES, Patricia	L
3	BUNAG, Joanne	OP
4	SANTIAGO, Aleona Denise	MB
5	BALSE, Mary Jean	MB
6	AGANON, Carmina	OH
7	SALAK, Cristina	S
8	GONZAGA, Jovelyn	OP
9	CAROLINO, Michelle (c)	OH
11	CRUZ, Dahlia	OP
13	DAQUIS, Rachel Ann	OH
14	BAUTISTA, Nerissa	OH
15	AGNO, Christine	L
16	GONZALES, Sarah Jane	S

PLDT HOME TELPAD TURBO BOOSTERS
No.	Player name	Position
1	DE LEON, Rubie	S
2	DEVANADERA, Ryzabelle	MB
3	ROCES, Suzanne (c)	OP
6	PANTONE, Lizlee Ann	L
8	BENTING, Angela	OH
9	BANATICLA, Maruja	OP
11	LATIGAY, Laurence Ann	OH
12	PATILLANO, Lourdes	S
14	SORIANO, Ma. Rosario	MB
16	EROA, Alyssa	L
17	GULIMAN, Nica	MB

=== Preliminaries ===
Pos	Team	Pld	W	L	Pts	SW	SL	SR	SPW	SPL	SPR
1	Philippine Army Lady Troopers	6	6	0	15	18	8	2.250	595	536	1.110
2	Cagayan Valley Lady Rising Suns	6	4	2	14	16	7	2.286	533	457	1.166
3	PLDT Home Telpad Turbo Boosters	6	2	4	6	9	17	0.529	470	517	0.909
4	Meralco Power Spikers	6	0	6	1	4	18	0.222	433	521	0.831

Date	Time		Score		Set 1	Set 2	Set 3	Set 4	Set 5	Total	Report
0510	18:00	PAR	3–0	MER	25-19	25-18	25-18			75–0	P2
0710	18:00	CAG	2–3	PAR	25-17	17-25	25-17	21-25	13-15	101–0	P2
0910	18:00	MER	0–3	PLD	18-25	21-25	19-25			58–0	P2
1210	18:00	PLD	0–3	CAG	16-25	17-25	25-27			58–0	P2
1410	18:00	CAG	3–0	MER	25-14	25-20	25-16			75–0	P2
1610	18:00	PAR	3–1	PLD	29-31	25-19	25-16	25-18		104–0	P2
1910	18:00	MER	1–3	PAR	23-25	25-23	20-25	19-25		87–0	P2
2110	18:00	PLD	3–2	MER	25-20	25-14	22-25	16-25	17-15	105–0	P2
2310	18:00	PAR	3–2	CAG	25-22	26-24	26-28	23-25	15-13	115–0	P2
2610	18:00	CAG	3–0	PLD	25-15	25-20	25-16			75–0	P2
2810	18:00	PLD	2–3	PAR	25-23	16-25	25-16	21-25	10-15	97–0	P2
3010	18:00	MER	1–3	CAG	25-17	14-25	24-26	21-25		84–0	P2

=== Finals ===
==== Battle for Bronze ====
November 4, 2014; 4:00 PM	PLDT	3–2	Meralco	Filoil Flying V Arena; Attendance: 513; Referees: ROJAS Rodrigo (NR) & SILLA Sevirino (NR)
November 4, 2014; 4:00 PM	(25–21, 21–25, 20–25, 25–20, 15–11)			Filoil Flying V Arena; Attendance: 513; Referees: ROJAS Rodrigo (NR) & SILLA Sevirino (NR)

November 6, 2014; 4:00 PM	Meralco	2–3	PLDT	Filoil Flying V Arena; Attendance: 674; Referees: MALAZARTE Dante (NR) & GAA Efren (IR)
November 6, 2014; 4:00 PM	(20–25, 28–26, 20–25, 25–19, 8–15)			Filoil Flying V Arena; Attendance: 674; Referees: MALAZARTE Dante (NR) & GAA Efren (IR)

==== Battle for Gold ====
November 2, 2014; 4:00 PM	ARMY	1–3	CAGAYAN	Filoil Flying V Arena; Attendance: 2,121; Referees: PAJARILLO Lumer (NR) & ROJAS Rodrigo (IR)
November 2, 2014; 4:00 PM	(23–25, 25–20, 21–25, 18–25)			Filoil Flying V Arena; Attendance: 2,121; Referees: PAJARILLO Lumer (NR) & ROJAS Rodrigo (IR)

November 9, 2014; 2:45 PM	CAGAYAN	3–2	ARMY	Filoil Flying V Arena; Referees: VILLAREAL Jess (NR) & ROJAS Rodrigo (IR)
November 9, 2014; 2:45 PM	(22–25, 25–23, 25–17, 20–25, 15–9)			Filoil Flying V Arena; Referees: VILLAREAL Jess (NR) & ROJAS Rodrigo (IR)

=== Final standings ===
Rank	Team
1st place, gold medalist(s)	Cagayan Valley Lady Rising Suns
2nd place, silver medalist(s)	Philippine Army Lady Troopers
3rd place, bronze medalist(s)	PLDT Home Telpad Turbo Boosters
4	Meralco Power Spikers

Shakey's V-League 11th Season Reinforced Open Conference Women's Division Champions

2nd title

Team roster
Gyzelle Sy, Maria Angeli Tabaquero (c), Charlene Gillego (L), Pau Soriano, Rosemarie Vargas, Aiza Maizo-Pontillas, Janine Marciano, Analyn Jhoy Benito, Shiela Marie Pineda (L), Wenneth Eulalio, Relea Ferina Saet, Patcharee Sangmuang (FG), Amporn Hyapha (FG)

Head coach
Ernesto Pamilar

== Men's Division ==
=== Participating teams ===
Participating teams
Instituto Estetico Manila Volley Masters	Systema Active Smashers
Rizal Technological University Blue Thunder	FEU Tamaraws

=== Season's Line-Up ===
Legend
S	Setter
MH	Middle Blocker
OH	Outside Hitter
OP	Opposite Hitter
L	Libero
(c)	Team Captain

FEU Tamaraws
No.	Player name	Position
1	PALER, Redijohn	
2	SOLIS, Richard	
3	REFUGIA, Manolo (c)	
5	MARMETO, Rikko	
6	VILLEGAS, Ronchette	
7	MARGATE, Lucky	
8	GACUTAN, Jeric	
9	BARRICA, Joshua	
11	MARMETO, Leo	
12	MIRANDA, Clifford	
13	PROVIDO, Salmar	
14	CAMCAM, Franco	
15	CAYABAN, Joel	
16	DOLOR, Greg	

Instituto Estetico Manila Volley Masters
No.	Player name	Position
1	CONDE, Michael Ian	OH
2	ALMARIO, Carlo	L
3	CERILLES, Reyvic	
4	GONZALES, Gian Carlo	
5	TIMBAL, Salvador	
6	DELA CALZADA, Karl Ian	OP
7	ORDOÑEZ, Rennz (c)	
8	SALCEDO, Arjay	
9	JIMENEZ, Jeffrey	MH
10	ROSETE, Karl	
12	CANLAS, Eden	
14	VICENTE, Joshua	
15	CANLAS, Jason	
16	GATDULA, Rudy	

Rizal Technological University Blue Thunder
No.	Player name	Position
1	DULAHID, Alnasil	
3	ABDUL, Sabtal (c)	
4	PAGTALUNAN, John	
5	PATROCENIO, Paul Bryan	
6	JAIDAL, Abdul Majid	
7	CRISISTOMO, Ryan	
8	ALJON, Edwin	
9	JAPSON, Jeffery	
10	BAYKING, Kenneth	
11	CAMPOY, Jamenel	
14	MASUHOD, Sahud	
16	REALES, Francis	
16	SEBASTIAN, Carlo	
18	JAMIRI, Pathie	

Systema Active Smashers
No.	Player name	Position
1	MACASAET, Chris (c)	MH
2	ROJAS, Patrick John	OH
3	DEPANTE, Salvador	OH
4	HU, Rhenze	L
5	MACALMA, John Angelo	S
6	ANTONIO, Christopher	OP
7	LEE, Mark	OH
8	GOMEZ, Richard	OH
9	HONRADE, Sylvester	MH
10	ABDULWAHAB, Al-Frazin	S
11	TONQUIN, Roland	MH
13	ARBASTO, Christian	MH
14	ESPIRITU, Angelo	OH
15	BAÑAGA, Anjo	

=== Preliminaries ===
Pos	Team	Pld	W	L	Pts	SW	SL	SR	SPW	SPL	SPR
1	Instituto Estetico Manila	6	5	1	15	17	6	2.833	539	471	1.144
2	Systema	6	4	2	12	15	9	1.667	539	494	1.091
3	Far Eastern University	6	2	4	5	8	16	0.500	491	527	0.932
4	Rizal Technological University	6	1	5	4	8	17	0.471	493	571	0.863

Date	Time		Score		Set 1	Set 2	Set 3	Set 4	Set 5	Total	Report
Oct 05	16:00	IEM	3–2	SYS	17–25	25–19	25–18	23–25	15–12	105–99	P−2
Oct 07	16:00	SYS	3–2	FEU	14–25	25–18	19–25	25–9	15–9	98–86	P−2
Oct 09	16:00	FEU	3–2	RTU	17–25	21–25	25–23	25–20	16–14	104–107	P−2
Oct 12	16:00	RTU	3–2	IEM	25–22	25–27	12–25	29–27	15–11	106–112	P−2
Oct 14	16:00	IEM	3–0	FEU	25–20	25–22	25–20			75–62	P−2
Oct 16	16:00	SYS	3–1	RTU	25–18	22–25	25–17	25–22		97–82	P−2
Oct 19	16:00	FEU	0–3	SYS	27–29	24–26	18–25			69–80	P−2
Oct 21	16:00	RTU	0–3	IEM	14–25	22–25	16–25			52–75	P−2
Oct 23	16:00	IEM	3–0	FEU	25–20	25–21	25–21			75–62	P−2
Oct 26	16:00	FEU	3–2	RTU	25–18	25–15	23–25	20–25	15–9	108–92	P−2
Oct 28	16:00	RTU	0–3	SYS	14–25	19–25	22–25			55–75	P−2
Oct 30	16:00	SYS	1–3	IEM	23–25	25–21	21–25	21–25		90–96	P−2

=== Finals ===
==== Battle for Bronze ====
November 4, 2014; 2:00 PM	FEU	3–1	RTU	Filoil Flying V Arena; Attendance: 371; Referees: MALAZARTE Dante (NR) & PAJARILLO Lumer (NR)
November 4, 2014; 2:00 PM	(30–28, 21–25, 25–16, 25–23)			Filoil Flying V Arena; Attendance: 371; Referees: MALAZARTE Dante (NR) & PAJARILLO Lumer (NR)

November 6, 2014; 2:00 PM	RTU	3–0	FEU	Filoil Flying V Arena; Attendance: 532; Referees: VILLAREAL Jess (NR) & SILLA Sevirino (NR)
November 6, 2014; 2:00 PM	(36–34, 25–19, 25–22)			Filoil Flying V Arena; Attendance: 532; Referees: VILLAREAL Jess (NR) & SILLA Sevirino (NR)

November 16, 2014; 12:55 PM	FEU	3–2	RTU	Filoil Flying V Arena; Attendance: 894; Referees: BENITO Liberato (IR) & BONGKINGKI Danilo (NR)
November 16, 2014; 12:55 PM	(25–22, 20–25, 16–25, 28–26, 15–13)			Filoil Flying V Arena; Attendance: 894; Referees: BENITO Liberato (IR) & BONGKINGKI Danilo (NR)

==== Battle for Gold ====
November 2, 2014; 2:00 PM	IEM	2–3	SYSTEMA	Filoil Flying V Arena; Attendance: 728; Referees: GAA, Efren (IR) & BONGKIKI, Danilo (NR)
November 2, 2014; 2:00 PM	(25–21, 25–23, 19–25, 23–25, 14–16)			Filoil Flying V Arena; Attendance: 728; Referees: GAA, Efren (IR) & BONGKIKI, Danilo (NR)

November 9, 2014; 12:45 PM	SYSTEMA	2–3	IEM	Filoil Flying V Arena; Attendance: 1,035; Referees: BONGKINGKI Danilo (NR) & GAA Efren (IR)
November 9, 2014; 12:45 PM	(25–19, 19–25, 25–13, 21–25, 13–15)			Filoil Flying V Arena; Attendance: 1,035; Referees: BONGKINGKI Danilo (NR) & GAA Efren (IR)

November 16, 2014; 3:40 PM	IEM	3–2	SYSTEMA	Filoil Flying V Arena; Attendance: 2,541; Referees: VILLAREAL Jess (NR) & RAOJAS Rodrigo (NR)
November 16, 2014; 3:40 PM	(25–21, 24–26, 25–22, 14–25, 15–12)			Filoil Flying V Arena; Attendance: 2,541; Referees: VILLAREAL Jess (NR) & RAOJAS Rodrigo (NR)

=== Final standings ===
Rank	Team
1st place, gold medalist(s)	Instituto Estetico Manila Phoenix Volley Masters
2nd place, silver medalist(s)	Systema Active Smashers
3rd place, bronze medalist(s)	Far Eastern University
4	Rizal Technological University

Shakey's V-League 11th Season Reinforced Open Conference Men's Division Champions

1st title

Team roster
Michael Ian Conde, Carlo Almario, Reyvic Cerilles, Gian Carlo Gonzales, Salvador Timbal, Karl Ian Dela Calzada, Rennz Ordoñez (c), Arjay Salcedo, Jeffrey Jimenez, Karl Rosete, Eden Canlas, Joshua Vicente, Jason Canlas, Rudy Gatdula

Head coach
Ernesto Balubar

== Individual awards ==
Men's	Award	Women's
Jeffrey Jimenez (IEM)	Final's MVP	Aiza Maizo-Pontillas (CAG)
Jeffrey Jimenez (IEM)	Season's MVP	Aiza Maizo-Pontillas (CAG)
Salvador Depante (SYS)	Best scorer	Aiza Maizo-Pontillas (CAG)
Jeffrey Jimenez (IEM)	Best spiker	Jovelyn Gonzaga (PAR)
Rocky Hondrade (SYS)	Best blocker	Abigail Maraño (MER)
Joshua Barrica (FEU)	Best server	Relea Ferina Saet (CAG)
Renz Ordoñez (IEM)	Best setter	Rubie De Leon (PLD)
Rikko Marmeto (FEU)	Best receiver	Shiela Marie Pineda (CAG)
Kenneth Bayking (RTU)	Best digger	Lizlee Ann Gata-Pantone (PLD)
