= 2013 Shakey's V-League season =

2013 SVL season
- League: Shakey's V-League
- Sport: Volleyball
- TV partner(s): GMA News TV (local); GMA Pinoy TV (international)

1st Conference
- Season champions: NU Lady Bulldogs
- Runners-up: Ateneo Lady Eagles
- Season MVP: Dindin Santiago

Open Conference
- Season champions: Cagayan Valley Lady Rising Suns
- Runners-up: Smart-Maynilad Net Spikers
- Season MVP: Jovelyn Gonzaga

Seasons
- ← 2012, 9th 11th, 2014 →

The 2013 Shakey's V-League (SVL) season was the tenth season of the Shakey's V-League. There were two indoor conferences for this season.

== 1st Conference ==
The Shakey's V-League 10th Season 1st Conference was the eighteenth conference of Shakey's V-League, a collegiate women's volleyball league in the Philippines founded in 2004. The opening ceremonies was held on April 7, 2013 at the Filoil Flying V Arena in San Juan.

Shakey's V-League 10th Season 1st Conference Participating Teams
Abbr.	Team	Colors	Head coach	Team captain
ADU	Adamson Lady Falcons		Sherwin Meneses	(Philippines) Ma. Paulina Soriano
AUN	Arellano Lady Chiefs		Roberto "Obet" Javier	(Philippines) Lexyl Lou Osero
ADM	Ateneo Lady Eagles		Roger Gorayeb	(Philippines) Jamenea Ferrer
CSL	Letran Lady Knights		Brian Esquibel	(Thailand) Patcharee Sangmuang
LSD	La Salle Dasmariñas Lady Patriots		Darwin Campana	(Philippines) Jennifer Manzano
NUI	NU Lady Bulldogs		Edjet Mabbayad	(Philippines) Dindin Santiago
SSC	San Sebastian Lady Stags		Clint Malazo	(Philippines) Sue Roces
UPH	Perpetual Lady Altas		Jason Sapin	(Philippines) Honey Royse Tubino
USC	University of San Carlos Lady Warriors		Norvie Labugan	(Philippines) Nina Irish Cortes
UST	UST Growling Tigresses		Arthur Alan "Odjie" Mamon	(Philippines) Rhea Katrina Dimaculangan

=== Preliminary round ===
Pool A

Team	W	L	PCT	GB	SW	SL	Avg
Ateneo Lady Eagles	4	0	1.388	0	12	1	12.000
UST Growling Tigresses	3	1	1.095	0	9	4	2.250
La Salle Dasma Lady Patriots	2	2	0.967	0	6	6	1.000
San Sebastian Lady Stags	1	3	0.894	0	5	10	0.500
Letran Lady Knights	0	4	0.783	0	1	12	0.083

Pool B

Team	W	L	PCT	GB	SW	SL	Avg
NU Lady Bulldogs	4	0	1.224	0	12	5	2.400
Adamson Lady Falcons	3	1	1.159	0	10	4	2.500
Arellano Lady Chiefs	2	2	0.983	0	7	9	0.778
Perpetual Lady Altas	1	3	0.908	0	7	9	0.778
USC Lady Warriors	0	4	0.779	0	3	12	0.250

Qualified to the quarterfinals

=== Quarterfinals ===
Pool C

Team	W	L	PCT	GB	SW	SL	Avg
NU Lady Bulldogs	3	0	1.361	0	9	1	9.000
Ateneo Lady Eagles	2	1	1.149	0	6	3	2.000
Arellano Lady Chiefs	1	2	0.571	0	4	7	0.931
La Salle Dasma Lady Patriots	0	3	0.111	0	1	9	0.705

Pool D

Team	W	L	PCT	GB	SW	SL	Avg
UST Growling Tigresses	3	0	1.079	0	9	5	1.800
Adamson Lady Falcons	2	1	1.112	0	8	5	1.600
Perpetual Lady Altas	1	2	0.935	0	6	7	0.857
San Sebastian Lady Stags	0	3	0.890	0	3	9	0.333

Qualified to the semifinals

=== Final round ===
- All series are best-of-3

Semifinals
1D	UST Growling Tigresses	1	1
2C	Ateneo Lady Eagles	3	3
1C	NU Lady Bulldogs	2	3	3
2D	Adamson Lady Falcons	3	2	2

Finals
Ateneo Lady Eagles	3	0	1
NU Lady Bulldogs	0	3	3
3rd place
UST Growling Tigresses	3	1	3
Adamson Lady Falcons	2	3	1

Final standings

Rank	Team
1st place, gold medalist(s)	NU Lady Bulldogs
2nd place, silver medalist(s)	Ateneo Lady Eagles
3rd place, bronze medalist(s)	UST Growling Tigresses
4	Adamson Lady Falcons
5	Arellano Lady Chiefs
6	Perpetual Lady Altas
7	La Salle Dasmariñas Lady Patriots
8	San Sebastian Lady Stags
9	Letran Lady Knights
10	University of San Carlos Lady Warriors

Individual awards

Award		Name
Most Valuable Player	Finals: Conference:	Rubie De Leon ( NU); Dindin Santiago( NU)
Best Scorer		Dindin Santiago ( NU)
Best Attacker		Myla Pablo ( NU)
Best Blocker		Maika Ortiz ( UST)
Best Server		Alyssa Valdez ( Ateneo)
Best Setter		Rubie De Leon ( NU)
Best Digger		Jaroensri Bualee ( San Sebastian)
Best Receiver		Jennylyn Reyes ( NU)
Most Improved Player		Pamela Tricia Lastimosa ( UST)

== Open Conference ==
The Shakey's V-League 10th Season Open Conference was the nineteenth conference of the Shakey's V-League, commenced on August 18, 2013 at the Filoil Flying V Centre, San Juan with 8 teams competing in the conference.

Shakey's V-League 10th Season Open Conference Participating Teams
Team	Colors	Line-up	Head coach
Cagayan Valley Lady Rising Suns		Angeli Tabaquero (c), Jheck Dionela, Rosemarie Vargas, Leuseht Dawis, Aiza Maizo, Kannika Thipachot, Sandra delos Santos, Soraya Phomla, Joy Benito, Wenneth Eulalio, Chie Saet, Bang Pineda, Alarnie Puylong, Pau Soriano	Ernesto Pamilar
FEU Lady Tamaraws		Christine Agno, Bernadeth Pons, Marie Charlegmane Simborio, Toni Basas, Glayssa Faith Torres, Winonah Bagang, Geneveve Casugod, Samantha Dawson, Remy Palma, Yna Papa (c), Kyla Atienza, Gyzel Sy	Shaq delos Santos
Meralco Power Spikers		April Jose, Roma Hofilena, Ma. Conception De Guzman, LC Girly Quemada, Karla Bello, Shedd Dela Pena, Zharmaine Velez, Maica Morada, Maureen Penetrante (c), Ivy Remulla, Jen Reyes, Steph Mercado, Fille Cainglet, Wang Coco	Oliver Almadro
Philippine Air Force Lady Jet Spikers		Rhea Dimaculangan, Joy Cases, Mariel Legaspi, Iari Yongco, Mary Ann Balmaceda, Mary Ann Pantino, Wendy Semana (c), Jennifer Manzano, Judy Caballejo, Maika Ortiz, Liza de Ramos, Camille Abanto, Gena Andaya	Clarence Esteban
Philippine Army Lady Troopers		Genie Sabas, Patricia Siatan-Torres, Joanne Bunag (c), Mayeth Carolino, Ging Balse, Jacq Alarca, Tina Salak, Jovelyn Gonzaga, Michelle Carolino, Angela Nunag, Dahlia Cruz, Ers Iratay, Rachel Daquis, Nene Bautista	Rico de Guzman
Philippine Navy Lady Sailors		Kite Rosale, Cecille Cruzada, Francislyn Cais, Camille Cerveza, Abigail Praca, Shiesa Nebrida, Zenaida Chavez, Aileen Suson, Janeth Serafica (c), Czarina Marie Reyes, Mic Mic Laborte, Pinkee Fajardo	Zenaida Chavez
PNP Lady Patrollers		Jennifer Mia, Ghileen Labrador, Jill Gustilo, Janine Marciano, Mitch Datuin (c), Frances Molina, Justyne Tadeo, Melissa Ogana, Patcharee Sangmuang	Ramonita Pajanostan
Smart-Maynilad Net Spikers		Rubie de Leon (c), Alyssa Valdez, Sue Roces, Grethcel Soltones, Charo Soriano, Melissa Gohing, Nica Guliman, Jem Ferrer, Maru Banaticla, Lithawat Kesinee, Dindin Santiago, Wanida Kotruang	Roger Gorayeb

=== Final round ===
- All series are best-of-3

Semifinals
1	Cagayan Valley Lady Rising Suns	3	3
4	Philippine Air Force Lady Jet Spikers	1	0
3	Smart-Maynilad Net Spikers	3	2	3
2	Philippine Army Lady Troopers	1	3	2

Finals
Cagayan Valley Lady Rising Suns	3	3
Smart-Maynilad Net Spikers	2	2
3rd place
Philippine Army Lady Troopers	3	3
Philippine Air Force Lady Jet Spikers	0	1

==== Match results ====
3rd place

Date	Time	Teams	Set	1	2	3	4	5	Total	Report
Oct 15	14:00	Philippine Army Lady Troopers	3	26	29	25			80	
Oct 15	14:00	Philippine Air Force Lady Jet Spikers	0	24	27	21			72	
Oct 20	14:00	Philippine Army Lady Troopers	3	25	23	25	25		98	
Oct 20	14:00	Philippine Air Force Lady Jet Spikers	1	18	25	23	15		81	

Championship

Date	Time	Teams	Set	1	2	3	4	5	Total	Report
Oct 15	16:00	Cagayan Valley Lady Rising Suns	3	26	25	23	11	15	100	
Oct 15	16:00	Smart-Maynilad Net Spikers	2	24	11	25	25	12	97	
Oct 20	16:00	Cagayan Valley Lady Rising Suns	3	25	19	25	22	15	106	
Oct 20	16:00	Smart-Maynilad Net Spikers	2	16	25	15	25	7	88	

Final standings

Rank	Team
1st place, gold medalist(s)	Cagayan Valley Lady Rising Suns
2nd place, silver medalist(s)	Smart-Maynilad Net Spikers
3rd place, bronze medalist(s)	Philippine Army Lady Troopers
4	Philippine Air Force Lady Jet Spikers
5	Meralco Power Spikers
6	PNP Lady Patrollers
7	Philippine Navy Lady Sailors
8	FEU Lady Tamaraws

Individual awards

Award		Name
Most Valuable Player	Finals: Conference:	(Thailand) Soraya Phomla (Cagayan) (Philippines) Jovelyn Gonzaga (Army)
Best Scorer		(Thailand) Kannika Thipachot (Cagayan)
Best Attacker		(Philippines) Jovelyn Gonzaga (Army)
Best Blocker		(Philippines) Maureen Penetrante-Ouano (Meralco)
Best Server		(Philippines) Mary Jean Balse (Army)
Best Setter		(Thailand) Soraya Phomla (Cagayan)
Best Digger		(Philippines) Melissa Gohing (Smart-Maynilad Net Spikers)
Best Receiver		(Philippines) Jennylyn Reyes (Meralco)

== Broadcast partner ==
- GMA News TV (local)
- GMA Pinoy TV (international)
