= 2013 Shakey's V-League Open Conference =

Shakey's V-League 10th Season Open Conference
Women's Finals	G1	G2	Wins
Cagayan Valley Lady Rising Suns	3	3	2
Smart-Maynilad Net Spikers	2	2	0
- Duration: Aug. 18 – Oct. 20, 2013
- Arenas: Filoil Flying V Arena, San Juan
- Finals MVP: Soraya Phomla
- Winning coach: Ernesto Pamilar
- Semifinalists: Philippine Army Lady Troopers; Philippine Air Force Lady Jet Spikers
- TV networks: GMA News TV (local); GMA Pinoy TV (international)

The 2013 Shakey's V-League Open Conference was the 19th conference of the Shakey's V-League and the second conference of the 2013 season. It commenced on August 18, 2013, at the Filoil Flying V Centre, San Juan with 8 teams competing in the conference.

== Participating teams ==
Shakey's V-League 10th Season Open Conference Participating Teams
Team	Colors	Line-up	Head coach
Cagayan Valley Lady Rising Suns		Angeli Tabaquero (c), Jheck Dionela, Rosemarie Vargas, Leuseht Dawis, Aiza Maizo, Kannika Thipachot, Sandra delos Santos, Soraya Phomla, Joy Benito, Wenneth Eulalio, Chie Saet, Bang Pineda, Alarnie Puylong, Pau Soriano	Ernesto Pamilar
FEU Lady Tamaraws		Christine Agno, Bernadeth Pons, Marie Charlegmane Simborio, Toni Basas, Glayssa Faith Torres, Winonah Bagang, Geneveve Casugod, Samantha Dawson, Remy Palma, Yna Papa (c), Kyla Atienza, Gyzel Sy	Shaq delos Santos
Meralco Power Spikers		April Jose, Roma Hofilena, Ma. Conception De Guzman, LC Girly Quemada, Karla Bello, Shedd Dela Pena, Zharmaine Velez, Maica Morada, Maureen Penetrante (c), Ivy Remulla, Jen Reyes, Steph Mercado, Fille Cainglet, Wang Coco	Oliver Almadro
Philippine Air Force Lady Jet Spikers		Rhea Dimaculangan, Joy Cases, Mariel Legaspi, Iari Yongco, Mary Ann Balmaceda, Mary Ann Pantino, Wendy Semana (c), Jennifer Manzano, Judy Caballejo, Maika Ortiz, Liza de Ramos, Camille Abanto, Gena Andaya	Clarence Esteban
Philippine Army Lady Troopers		Genie Sabas, Patricia Siatan-Torres, Joanne Bunag (c), Mayeth Carolino, Ging Balse, Jacq Alarca, Tina Salak, Jovelyn Gonzaga, Michelle Carolino, Angela Nunag, Dahlia Cruz, Ers Iratay, Rachel Daquis, Nene Bautista	Rico de Guzman
Philippine Navy Lady Sailors		Kite Rosale, Cecille Cruzada, Francislyn Cais, Camille Cerveza, Abigail Praca, Shiesa Nebrida, Zenaida Chavez, Aileen Suson, Janeth Serafica (c), Czarina Marie Reyes, Mic Mic Laborte, Pinkee Fajardo	Zenaida Chavez
PNP Lady Patrollers		Jennifer Mia, Ghileen Labrador, Jill Gustilo, Janine Marciano, Mitch Datuin (c), Frances Molina, Justyne Tadeo, Melissa Ogana, Patcharee Sangmuang	Ramonita Pajanostan
Smart-Maynilad Net Spikers		Rubie de Leon (c), Alyssa Valdez, Sue Roces, Grethcel Soltones, Charo Soriano, Melissa Gohing, Nica Guliman, Jem Ferrer, Maru Banaticla, Lithawat Kesinee, Dindin Santiago, Wanida Kotruang	Roger Gorayeb

== Tournament format ==
=== Preliminaries ===
Eight (8) competing teams had a Single Round-robin. Top six (6) teams qualified for the Quarterfinals.

=== Quarterfinals ===
The top six (6) teams battled for the top four (4) spots in a Single Round-robin with their scores from the preliminaries carried over, minus the ones won over the eliminated teams.

=== Semi-finals ===
The four (4) semi-finalists will compete against each other in a best-of-three series as follows: Rank #1 vs Rank #4 and Rank #2 vs Rank #3. The two (2) SF winners will compete for GOLD. The two (2) SF losers will compete for BRONZE

=== Finals ===
The battle for GOLD and the battle for BRONZE will both follow the best-of-three format, provided: If the battle for GOLD ends in two (2) matches (2-0), then there will no longer be Game 3 for either GOLD or BRONZE. If, in the case, the series for BRONZE is tied (1-1), then the tie will be resolved using FIVB rules. A tie in the series for GOLD (1-1) after Game 2 will be broken in a Game 3, regardless of the results of the series in BRONZE.

== Preliminary round ==
Pos	Team	Pld	W	L	Pts	SW	SL	SR	SPW	SPL	SPR	Qualification
1	Cagayan Valley Lady Rising Suns	7	7	0	20	21	3	7.000	582	446	1.305	Qualified for Quarterfinals
2	Philippine Army Lady Troopers	7	6	1	16	18	7	2.571	551	430	1.281	Qualified for Quarterfinals
3	Philippine Air Force Lady Jet Spikers	7	5	2	14	16	8	2.000	533	482	1.106	Qualified for Quarterfinals
4	Smart-Maynilad Net Spikers	7	4	3	13	14	10	1.400	533	477	1.117	Qualified for Quarterfinals
5	Meralco Power Spikers	7	3	4	8	12	16	0.750	592	595	0.995	Qualified for Quarterfinals
6	PNP Lady Patrollers	7	2	5	8	10	17	0.588	520	518	1.004	Qualified for Quarterfinals
7	Philippine Navy Lady Sailors	7	1	6	3	4	18	0.222	374	532	0.703	
8	FEU Lady Tamaraws	7	0	7	1	4	21	0.190	470	600	0.783	

All times are Philippine Standard Time (UTC+08:00)

Date	Time		Score		Set 1	Set 2	Set 3	Set 4	Set 5	Total	Report
Aug 18	14:00	MER	3–2	PNP	25–17	17–25	21–25	25–15	15–9	103–91	
Aug 18	16:00	SMA	3–0	FEU	25–16	25–5	25–19			75–40	
Aug 23	14:00	PNP	0–3	SMA	14–25	15–25	17–25			46–75	
Aug 23	16:00	PAF	1–3	CAG	22–25	25–17	14–25	19–25		80–92	
Aug 25	14:00	PAR	3–0	PAF	25–13	25–22	25–18			75–53	
Aug 25	16:00	SMA	3–1	MER	22–25	25–20	25–20	27–25		99–90	
Aug 27	14:00	CAG	3–0	SMA	25–23	26–24	25–20			76–67	
Aug 27	16:00	MER	3–2	FEU	25–12	25–22	18–23	23–25	15–13	106–95	
Aug 30	14:00	FEU	0–3	PAF	20–25	21–25	19–25			60–75	
Aug 30	16:00	PNV	0–3	CAG	12–25	12–27	16–25			40–77	
Sep 01	14:00	PAR	3–0	PNV	25–14	25–12	25–13			75–39	
Sep 01	16:00	CAG	3–0	MER	26–24	25–22	25–14			76–60	
Sep 03	14:00	PNP	0–3	PAR	14–25	15–25	15–25			44–75	
Sep 03	16:00	MER	3–0	PNV	25–21	25–22	25–16			75–59	
Sep 06	14:00	FEU	0–3	CAG	16–25	17–25	22–25			55–75	
Sep 06	16:00	SMA	0–3	PAF	22–25	18–25	17–25			57–75	
Sep 08	14:00	PNV	3–0	FEU	25–23	25–23	25–17			75–63	
Sep 08	16:00	PAR	0–3	CAG	9–25	16–25	20–25			45–75	
Sep 10	14:00	CAG	3–2	PNP	22–25	29–27	25–13	20–25	15–9	111–99	
Sep 10	16:00	SMA	3–0	PNV	25–18	25–14	25–11			75–43	
Sep 13	14:00	PAF	3–0	PNV	25–18	25–8	25–16			75–42	
Sep 13	16:00	MER	0–3	PAR	21–25	16–25	18–25			55–75	
Sep 15	14:00	PNP	0–3	PAF	21–25	11–25	21–25			53–75	
Sep 15	16:00	PAR	3–2	SMA	25–22	25-19	22–25	20–25	15–13	107–85	
Sep 17	14:00	PNP	3–1	FEU	25–20	25–14	20–25	25–19		95–78	
Sep 17	16:00	PAF	3–2	MER	25–20	12–25	23–25	25–23	15–10	100–103	
Sep 20	14:00	FEU	1–3	PAR	15–25	17–25	26–24	21–25		79–99	
Sep 20	16:00	PNV	1–3	PNP	16–25	14–25	25–17	21–25		76–92	

== Quarterfinals ==
Pos	Team	Pld	W	L	Pts	SW	SL	SR	SPW	SPL	SPR	Qualification
1	Cagayan Valley Lady Rising Suns	10	10	0	26	30	11	2.727	936	797	1.174	Qualified for Semifinals
2	Philippine Army Lady Troopers	10	7	3	21	25	13	1.923	828	743	1.114	Qualified for Semifinals
3	Smart-Maynilad Net Spikers	10	6	4	18	22	19	1.158	893	861	1.037	Qualified for Semifinals
4	Philippine Air Force Lady Jet Spikers	10	5	5	15	20	19	1.053	818	840	0.974	Qualified for Semifinals
5	Meralco Power Spikers	10	2	8	8	14	27	0.519	832	907	0.917	
6	PNP Lady Patrollers	10	0	10	2	8	30	0.267	724	808	0.896	

All times are Philippine Standard Time (UTC+08:00)

Date	Time		Score		Set 1	Set 2	Set 3	Set 4	Set 5	Total	Report
Sep 22	14:00	PAR	3–0	PNP	25–13	25–23	25–22			75–58	
Sep 22	16:00	PAF	1–3	SMA	23–25	25–22	15–25	18–25		81–97	
Sep 23	14:00	CAG	3–1	PAF	22–25	25–20	25–20	25-22		97–65	
Sep 23	16:00	PAR	3–0	MER	25–18	25–19	25–19			75–56	
Sep 27	14:00	SMA	3–1	PNP	17–25	25–17	25–20	25–22		92–84	
Sep 27	16:00	MER	2–3	CAG	14–25	25–16	22–25	25–23	13–15	99–104	
Sep 29	14:00	PAR	3–2	PAF	25–22	25–21	21–25	19–25	15–13	105–106	
Sep 29	16:00	CAG	3–2	SMA	25–21	22–25	25–19	17–25	15–13	104–103	
Oct 01	14:00	PNP	1–3	CAG	20–25	21–25	25–22	21–25		87–97	
Oct 01	16:00	PAF	3–1	MER	19–25	25–20	25–14	25–22		94–81	
Oct 03	14:00	MER	3–1	PNP	25–19	25–15	16–25	25–23		91–82	
Oct 03	16:00	SMA	3–2	PAR	25–18	22–25	25–23	20–25	15–13	107–104	
Oct 06	14:00	PNP	1–3	PAF	16–25	22–25	25–14	17–25		80–89	
Oct 06	16:00	PAR	2–3	CAG	15–25	25–20	25–19	18–25	9–15	92–104	
Oct 06	18:00	MER	2–3	SMA	20–25	25–23	25–23	12–25	12–15	94–111	

== Final round ==
- All series are best-of-3

Semifinals
1	Cagayan Valley Lady Rising Suns	3	3
4	Philippine Air Force Lady Jet Spikers	1	0
3	Smart-Maynilad Net Spikers	3	2	3
2	Philippine Army Lady Troopers	1	3	2

Finals
Cagayan Valley Lady Rising Suns	3	3
Smart-Maynilad Net Spikers	2	2
3rd place
Philippine Army Lady Troopers	3	3
Philippine Air Force Lady Jet Spikers	0	1

=== Match results ===
- All times are in Philippines Standard Time (UTC+08:00)

Semifinals

==== Rank 1 vs Rank 4 ====
Date	Time	Teams	Set	1	2	3	4	5	Total	Report
Oct 08	16:00	Cagayan Valley Lady Rising Suns	3	17	30	25	25		97	
Oct 08	16:00	Philippine Air Force Lady Jet Spikers	1	25	28	19	9		81	
Oct 10	16:00	Cagayan Valley Lady Rising Suns	3	27	25	25			77	
Oct 10	16:00	Philippine Air Force Lady Jet Spikers	0	25	19	15			59	

==== Rank 2 vs Rank 3 ====
Date	Time	Teams	Set	1	2	3	4	5	Total	Report
Oct 08	14:00	Philippine Army Lady Troopers	1	26	17	25	27		95	
Oct 08	14:00	Smart-Maynilad Net Spikers	3	28	25	19	29		101	
Oct 10	14:00	Philippine Army Lady Troopers	3	25	18	12	25	15	95	
Oct 10	14:00	Smart-Maynilad Net Spikers	2	21	25	25	23	10	104	
Oct 13	16:00	Philippine Army Lady Troopers	2	25	20	13	25	10	93	
Oct 13	16:00	Smart-Maynilad Net Spikers	3	21	25	25	21	15	107	

3rd place

Date	Time	Teams	Set	1	2	3	4	5	Total	Report
Oct 15	14:00	Philippine Army Lady Troopers	3	26	29	25			80	
Oct 15	14:00	Philippine Air Force Lady Jet Spikers	0	24	27	21			72	
Oct 20	14:00	Philippine Army Lady Troopers	3	25	23	25	25		98	
Oct 20	14:00	Philippine Air Force Lady Jet Spikers	1	18	25	23	15		81	

Championship

Date	Time	Teams	Set	1	2	3	4	5	Total	Report
Oct 15	16:00	Cagayan Valley Lady Rising Suns	3	26	25	23	11	15	100	
Oct 15	16:00	Smart-Maynilad Net Spikers	2	24	11	25	25	12	97	
Oct 20	16:00	Cagayan Valley Lady Rising Suns	3	25	19	25	22	15	106	
Oct 20	16:00	Smart-Maynilad Net Spikers	2	16	25	15	25	7	88	

== Final standings ==
Rank	Team
1st place, gold medalist(s)	Cagayan Valley Lady Rising Suns
2nd place, silver medalist(s)	Smart-Maynilad Net Spikers
3rd place, bronze medalist(s)	Philippine Army Lady Troopers
4	Philippine Air Force Lady Jet Spikers
5	Meralco Power Spikers
6	PNP Lady Patrollers
7	Philippine Navy Lady Sailors
8	FEU Lady Tamaraws

== Awards ==
=== Individual awards ===
Award		Name
Most Valuable Player	Finals: Conference:	(Thailand) Soraya Phomla (Cagayan) (Philippines) Jovelyn Gonzaga (Army)
Best Scorer		(Thailand) Kannika Thipachot (Cagayan)
Best Attacker		(Philippines) Jovelyn Gonzaga (Army)
Best Blocker		(Philippines) Maureen Penetrante-Ouano (Meralco)
Best Server		(Philippines) Mary Jean Balse (Army)
Best Setter		(Thailand) Soraya Phomla (Cagayan)
Best Digger		(Philippines) Melissa Gohing (Smart-Maynilad Net Spikers)
Best Receiver		(Philippines) Jennylyn Reyes (Meralco)
