= 2013 Shakey's V-League 1st Conference =

Shakey's V-League 10th Season 1st Conference
Women's Finals	G1	G2	G3	Wins
NU Lady Bulldogs	0	3	3	2
Ateneo Lady Eagles	3	0	1	1
- Duration: April 7, 2013 to June 2, 2013
- Arena(s): Filoil Flying V Arena, San Juan; Mall of Asia Arena, Pasay; Philsports Arena, Pasig
- Finals MVP: Rubie De Leon
- Winning coach: Edjet Mabbayad
- Semifinalists: UST Growling Tigresses; Adamson Lady Falcons
- TV network(s): GMA News TV (local); GMA Pinoy TV (international)

The 2013 Shakey's V-League 1st Conference was the 18th conference of the Shakey's V-League and the first conference of the 2013 season. The opening ceremonies was held on April 7, 2013 with the first doubleheader of volleyball games at the Filoil Flying V Arena in San Juan.

There are three new teams who are participating in this season, they are the Arellano University Lady Chiefs, De La Salle University - Dasmariñas Lady Patriots, and the University of San Carlos Lady Warriors. This three new teams will face the seven current participating teams like ADMU, AdU, UST, NU, SSC-R, UPHSD and CSJL.

== Participants ==
The conference is composed of 10 teams, grouped into two pools, each consisting of five squads.

Participating teams
Pool A	Pool B
Ateneo de Manila University; Lady Eagles	Adamson University Lady Falcons
University of Santo Tomas; Tigresses	National University Lady Bulldogs
Colegio de San Juan de Letran Lady Knights	University of Perpetual Help System DALTA Lady Altas
San Sebastian College–Recoletos Lady Stags	Arellano University Lady Chiefs
De La Salle University - Dasmariñas Lady Patriots	University of San Carlos; Lady Warriors

== Season's Line-Up (Regular Players) ==
=== Pool A ===
ATENEO LADY EAGLES
No.	Player name	Position
2	VALDEZ, Alyssa	OH
4	TAN, Maria Gizelle Jessica	S
5	TAJIMA, Mary Mae	MH
6	GERVACIO, Angeline	OP
8	DE JESUS, Jorella Marie	OH
10	TEJADA, Margarita	MH
12	FERRER, Jamenea (c)	S
14	LLANETA, Jirah Mae	OH
15	CAINGLET, Fille Saint	OH
16	AHOMIRO, Rongomaipapa Amy	OP
17	TAN, Maria Beatriz	L
18	LAZARO, Dennise Michelle	L

UST TIGRESSES
No.	Player name	Position
2	HIROTSUJI, Midori	MH
3	CORTEZ, Chlodia Eiriel	OH
4	REYES, Ingrid	OH
6	LASTIMOSA, Pamela Tricia	OH
7	ORTIZ, Maika	MH
10	CABANOS, Alexine Danielle	S
11	CABALLEJO, Juddy Ann	OP
12	DUSARAN, Dancel Jan	L
14	LANTIN, Maria Loren	OP
15	DE LEON, Jessey Laine	MH
16	RASMO, Patrisha	L
18	TUNAY, Maria Carmela	OH

LETRAN LADY KNIGHTS
No.	Player name	Position
1	ESPELITA, Sarah Jane	OP
2	CARREON, Jan Juno	OH
3	MONDEJAR, Queennie	S
5	LOPEZ, Mikaela	MH
6	TADEO, Justyne	L
7	LASERNA, Honey Kris	L
8	MOLINA, Cynthia	MH
9	CU, Mellisa	OH
10	VILLAS, Jamaika Rikka	MH
11	PABLO, Monique	OH
12	BELLEZA, Patricia	OP
15	FORTO, Yvette	S

SAN SEBASTIAN LADY STAGS
No.	Player name	Position
1	ARABE, Nikka	MH
2	CRISOSTOMO, Trisha	S
4	CORPUZ, Jona	MH
5	SOLTONES, Gretchel	OH
6	BERBANO, Czarina	OP
8	CRISOSTOMO, Mae	L
9	MALLARE, Maria Ara	MH
11	UY, Bea Camille	OH
12	VILLEGAS, Katherine	MH
13	LABIANO, Jolina	OH

De La Salle University-Dasmariñas Lady Patriots
No.	Player name	Position
1	YONGCO, Iumi	L
2	LARA, Mariebeth	OP
3	CANILLAS, Beatrice	S
4	YONGCO, Iari	MH
5	FERNANDEZ, Jessamilflor	MH
6	DESENGANO, Mariel	S
7	BAQUILLES, Alisa Denise	L
8	TIANCO, Monique	OH
9	BEMBO, Gieselle	OH
10	NAVIDAD, Justine Mae	MH
11	NUNAG, Cherry Rose	MH
12	ZARATE, Jennifer	OP

=== Pool B ===
ADAMSON LADY FALCONS
No.	Player name	Position
1	PINEDA, Shiela Marie	OH
2	SORIANO, Ma. Paulina (c)	MH
5	ZAPANTA, Luisa Mae	OH
6	VILLANUEVA, Amanda Maria	OH
7	PIZA, Maria Theresa	OH
9	GUEVARA, Faye Janelle	OP
11	LISTANA, Princess Aimee	L
12	EMNAS, Fenela	S
14	MACATUNO, May Jennifer	S
15	CORTEL, Marleen	OP
17	ALKUINO, Maria Erika Gel	MH
18	MOHAMMAD, Anwarlyn	OH

NU LADY BULLDOGS
No.	Player name	Position
1	DADANG, Siemens Desiree	OH
2	PEREZ, Ivy Jisel	S
4	AGANON, Carmina	OH
5	GENERAL, Fatima Bia	OH
6	SALIBAD, Precious May	S
7	MANDAPAT, Rizza Jane	OH
8	NEPOMUCENO, Maricar	OP
9	URDAS, Aiko Sweet	OP
11	PABLO, Myla	OH
12	REYES, Jennylyn	L
14	MARZAN, Andrea	MH
16	SANTIAGO, Aleona Denise (c)	MH

PERPETUAL LADY ALTAS
No.	Player name	Position
1	CONDADA, Vhima	L
2	DELA PAZ, Rochel Ann	MH
3	ENIONG, Shallane	OP
4	SUYAT, Jamela	OH
5	DIAZ, Norie Jane	OH
6	GUILLERMO, Ann Carrizze	S
7	DIOCAREZA, Ana James	OH
8	SARTIN, April Anne	OH
10	DELOS SANTOS, Sandra	MH
11	ABAR, Janice	OP
14	CALLEJA, Mary Joy	L
15	TUBINO, Honey Royse (c)	MH

ARELLANO LADY CHIEFS
No.	Player name	Position
2	IBISA, Jonalyn	L
4	SAGUN, Elaine	OP
5	TICAR, Mary Jane	S
6	BELTRAN, Girty	OH
7	CALIXTO, Erica	OP
8	TUBIERA, Menchie	OH
12	OSERO, Lexyl Lou (c)	OH
13	ABDUL, Nahura	OH
14	HENSON, Danna	OH
15	LEGACION, Angelica	S
16	SALAMAGOS, Shirley	MH
17	CAWICAAN, Bunnie	MH

University of San Carlos Lady Warriors
No.	Player name	Position
2	ARANAS, Ma. Theresa	S
3	YPIL, Genevieve	L
4	RELOTA, Julie Pearl	S
7	SUCALIT, Christy	OP
9	IGNACIO, Excel	OH
10	MOLDE, Pamela	OH
11	GESULGA, Chona	OH
14	BATE, Methosheena	OH
15	PANIS, Suzette	OP
16	EVANGELISTA, Kara Louise	OH
17	CAPINPIN, Anna Krist	OP
18	CORTES, Nina Irish (c)	MH

Legend
S	Setter
MH	Middle Hitter
OH	Outside Hitter
OP	Opposite Hitter
L	Libero
(c)	Team Captain

== List of Guest Players ==
Pool A

Team	No.	Player name	Position
Ateneo Lady Eagles	1	PATNONGON, Aeriel *	Middle Hitter
Ateneo Lady Eagles	13	DAQUIS, Rachel Ann	Outside Hitter
UST Growling Tigresses	1	DIMACULANGAN, Rhea Katrina (c)	Setter
UST Growling Tigresses	8	MAIZO, Aiza	Opposite Hitter
Letran Lady Knights	14	SANGMUANG, Patcharee (c)	Outside Hitter
Letran Lady Knights	17	OGANA, Melissa	Middle Hitter
San Sebastian Lady Stags	3	ROCES, Suzanne (c)	Middle Hitter
San Sebastian Lady Stags	7	BUALEE, Jaroensri	Outside Hitter
De La Salle University-Dasmariñas Lady Patriots	17	SAET, Release Ferina	Setter
De La Salle University-Dasmariñas Lady Patriots	18	MAZANO, Jennifer (c)	Middle Hitter

Note: Jaroensri Bualee replaced Aeriel Patnongon as the other Guest Player for Ateneo Lady Eagles before the start of the Semifinals.

Pool B

Team	No.	Player name	Position
Adamson Lady Falcons	3	PAAT, Mylene	Middle Hitter
Adamson Lady Falcons	8	BENTING, Angela	Outside Hitter
NU Lady Bulldogs	3	SANTIAGO, Alyja Daphne	Middle Hitter
NU Lady Bulldogs	10	DE LEON, RUBIE	Setter
Arellano Lady Chiefs	1	BAUTISTA, Nerissa	Outside Hitter
Arellano Lady Chiefs	3	BALSE, Mary Jean	Middle Hitter
Perpetual Lady Altas	16	CASES, Joy Gazelle	Outside Hitter
Perpetual Lady Altas	18	AGARIN, Arriane Mai	Setter
University of San Carlos Lady Warriors	1	OBINQUE, Regine	Libero
University of San Carlos Lady Warriors	6	PRACA, Ma. Abigail	Middle Hitter

== List of Coaches & Staffs ==
Pool A

Team	Team Manager	Head coach	Assistant coach	Trainer 1	Trainer 2
Ateneo Lady Eagles		GORAYEB, Roger	TUPAZ, Parley	SORIANO, Ma. Rosario	PILI, Raymond
UST Growling Tigresses		MAMON, Odgie	PONCE DE LEON, Vilet	FERNANDEZ, Christian	
Letran Lady Knights		ESQUIBEL, Brian	ORDONEZ, Rwnz	MANUYAG, Alvin	PAMILAIZ, Mathew
San Sebastian Lady Stags		MALAZO, Clint			
De La Salle University-Dasmariñas Lady Patriots		CAMPANA, Darwin	RAMIREZ, Raymond		

POOL B

Team	Team Manager	Head coach	Assistant coach	Trainer 1	Trainer 2
Adamson Lady Falcons		MENESES, Sherwin	RAMOSO, Marvin		
NU Lady Bulldogs	CHUA, Rudy	MABBAYAD, Edjet	DELA CRUZ, Ariel		
Arellano Lady Chiefs	CAYOCO, Valente	JAVIER, Roberto	ESTACIO, Richard	PABELLANO, Mynela	SANTE, Rialen
Perpetual Lady Altas		SAPIN, Jason	RIETA, Sandy	RUSOS, Karl Maeven	
University of San Carlos Lady Warriors		LABUGA, Norvie	YUNGCO, Jessie		

== Tournament format ==
- Preliminaries
  - The ten (10) participating teams will be divided into two pools. The top four (4) teams in each pool will advance to the quarterfinals.
  - In the event of a two-way tie for 4th place, the tie will be resolved by a play-off game.
- Quarter-finals
  - The number one and number three seeded teams in each pool will be taken and will compose a new pool while the number two and number four seeded teams will make up the other pool.
  - Another round robin will be played in the set of pools with the record of a team against another team whom they previously met in the eliminations will be carried over.
  - If two teams are tied for 2nd place, FIVB Rules shall apply to determine the best two which will play-off to resolve the tie.
- Semi-finals
  - A best-of-three series will be played between the 1st seed of a pool and the 2nd seed of the other pool.
- Finals
  - A best-of-three series will be played between the 2 winners of the semis for the gold.
  - A best-of-three series will be played between the 2 losers of the semis for the bronze.
  - If the gold medalist is determined in two (2) games, the series for the bronze medal will also end in two (2) games. If the contenders for the bronze are tied after two (2) games, then FIVB Rules will determine the winner.

== Eliminations ==
=== Pool A ===
Qualified for quarterfinals

Team	W	L	PCT	GB	SW	SL	Avg
Ateneo Lady Eagles	4	0	1.388	0	12	1	12.000
UST Growling Tigresses	3	1	1.095	0	9	4	2.250
De La Salle University-Dasmariñas Lady Patriots	2	2	0.967	0	6	6	1.000
San Sebastian Lady Stags	1	3	0.894	0	5	10	0.500
Letran Lady Knights	0	4	0.783	0	1	12	0.083

=== Pool B ===
Qualified for quarterfinals

Team	W	L	PCT	GB	SW	SL	Avg
NU Lady Bulldogs	4	0	1.224	0	12	5	2.400
Adamson Lady Falcons	3	1	1.159	0	10	4	2.500
Arellano Lady Chiefs	2	2	0.983	0	7	9	0.778
Perpetual Lady Altas	1	3	0.908	0	7	9	0.778
University of San Carlos Lady Warriors	0	4	0.779	0	3	12	0.250

== Quarterfinals ==
=== Pool C ===
Qualified for semifinals

Team	W	L	PCT	GB	SW	SL	Avg
NU Lady Bulldogs	3	0	1.361	0	9	1	9.000
Ateneo Lady Eagles	2	1	1.149	0	6	3	2.000
Arellano Lady Chiefs	1	2	0.571	0	4	7	0.931
De La Salle University-Dasmariñas Lady Patriots	0	3	0.111	0	1	9	0.705

=== Pool D ===
Qualified for semifinals

Team	W	L	PCT	GB	SW	SL	Avg
UST Growling Tigresses	3	0	1.079	0	9	5	1.800
Adamson Lady Falcons	2	1	1.112	0	8	5	1.600
Perpetual Lady Altas	1	2	0.935	0	6	7	0.857
San Sebastian Lady Stags	0	3	0.890	0	3	9	0.333

== Bracket ==
Best-of-3 semifinals
1D	UST	0
2C	Ateneo	2
1C	NU	2
2D	Adamson	1

Best-of-3 Finals
2C	Ateneo	1
1C	NU	2
Best-of-3 third-place
1D	UST	2
2D	Adamson	1

== Semifinals ==
=== UST vs. Ateneo ===
May 14, 2013 2:00PM – Philsports Arena, Pasig
Team	1	2	3	4	Sets
UST	25	23	27	14	1
Ateneo	20	25	25	25	3

Ateneo leads series, 1-0

May 16, 2013 4:00PM – Mall of Asia Arena, Pasay
Team	1	2	3	4	Sets
Ateneo	25	23	25	25	3
UST	13	25	23	13	1

Ateneo wins series, 2-0

=== NU vs. Adamson ===
May 14, 2013 4:00PM – Philsports Arena, Pasig
Team	1	2	3	4	5	Sets
NU	25	18	19	25	13	2
Adamson	22	25	25	22	15	3

Adamson leads series, 1-0

May 16, 2013 2:00PM – Mall of Asia Arena, Pasay
Team	1	2	3	4	5	Sets
Adamson	25	21	26	21	12	2
NU	20	25	24	25	15	3

NU ties the series, 1-1

May 19, 2013 4:00PM – Filoil Flying V Arena, San Juan
Team	1	2	3	4	Sets
NU	24	25	25	25	3
Adamson	26	20	15	22	1

NU wins series, 2-1

== Finals ==
=== Bronze series ===
May 23, 2013 2:00PM – Mall of Asia Arena, Pasay
Team	1	2	3	4	5	Sets
Adamson	23	25	19	25	15	3
UST	25	23	25	23	12	2

Adamson leads series, 1-0

May 26, 2013 2:00PM – Mall of Asia Arena, Pasay
Team	1	2	3	4	Sets
UST	24	25	25	25	3
Adamson	26	17	20	17	1

UST ties the series, 1-1

June 2, 2013 2:00PM – Philsports Arena, Pasig
Team	1	2	3	4	Sets
UST	25	19	25	25	3
Adamson	18	25	19	16	1

UST won the series, 2-1

=== Championship Series ===
May 23, 2013 4:00PM – Mall of Asia Arena, Pasay
Team	1	2	3	Sets
NU	15	22	23	0
Ateneo	25	25	25	3

Ateneo leads series, 1-0

May 26, 2013 4:00PM – Mall of Asia Arena, Pasay
Team	1	2	3	Sets
Ateneo	24	23	22	0
NU	26	25	25	3

NU ties the series, 1-1

June 2, 2013 4:00PM – Philsports Arena, Pasig
Team	1	2	3	4	Sets
NU	25	25	17	26	3
Ateneo	23	20	25	24	1

NU won the series, 2-1

== Final standings ==
Rank	Team
1st place, gold medalist(s)	NU Lady Bulldogs
2nd place, silver medalist(s)	Ateneo Lady Eagles
3rd place, bronze medalist(s)	UST Growling Tigresses
4	Adamson Lady Falcons
5	Arellano Lady Chiefs
6	Perpetual Lady Altas
7	De La Salle University-Dasmariñas Lady Patriots
8	San Sebastian Lady Stags
9	Letran Lady Knights
10	University of San Carlos Lady Warriors

Shakey's V-League 10th Season 1st Conference Champions
National University
1st title

Team roster
1. DADANG, Siemens Desiree
2. PEREZ, Ivy Jisel
3. SANTIAGO, Alija Daphne (Guest Player)
4. AGANON, Carmina
5. GENERAL, Fatima Bia
6. SALIBAD, Precious May
7. MANDAPAT, Rizza Jane
8. NEPUMUCENO, Maricar
9. URDAS, Aiko Sweet
10. DE LEON, Rubie (Guest Player)
11. PABLO, Myla
12. REYES, Jennylyn (Libero)
14. MARZAN, Andrea
16. SANTIAGO, Aleona Denise (Team Captain)

Head coach
Edjet Mabbayad

== Individual awards ==
- Best scorer: (C) Dindin Santiago ( NU)
- Best attacker: Myla Pablo ( NU)
- Best blocker: Maika Ortiz ( UST)
- Best server: Alyssa Valdez ( Ateneo)
- Best digger: (G) Jaroensri Bualee ( San Sebastian)
- Best setter: (G) Rubie De Leon ( NU)
- Best receiver: (L) Jennylyn Reyes ( NU)
- Most Improved Player: Pamela Tricia Lastimosa ( UST)
- Most valuable player of the Season: (C) Dindin Santiago ( NU)
- Most valuable player of the Finals: (G) Rubie De Leon ( NU)

Note: 
(G) - Guest Player
(C) - Team Captain
(L) - Libero
