= Alyssa Valdez =

Filipino volleyball player (born 1993)

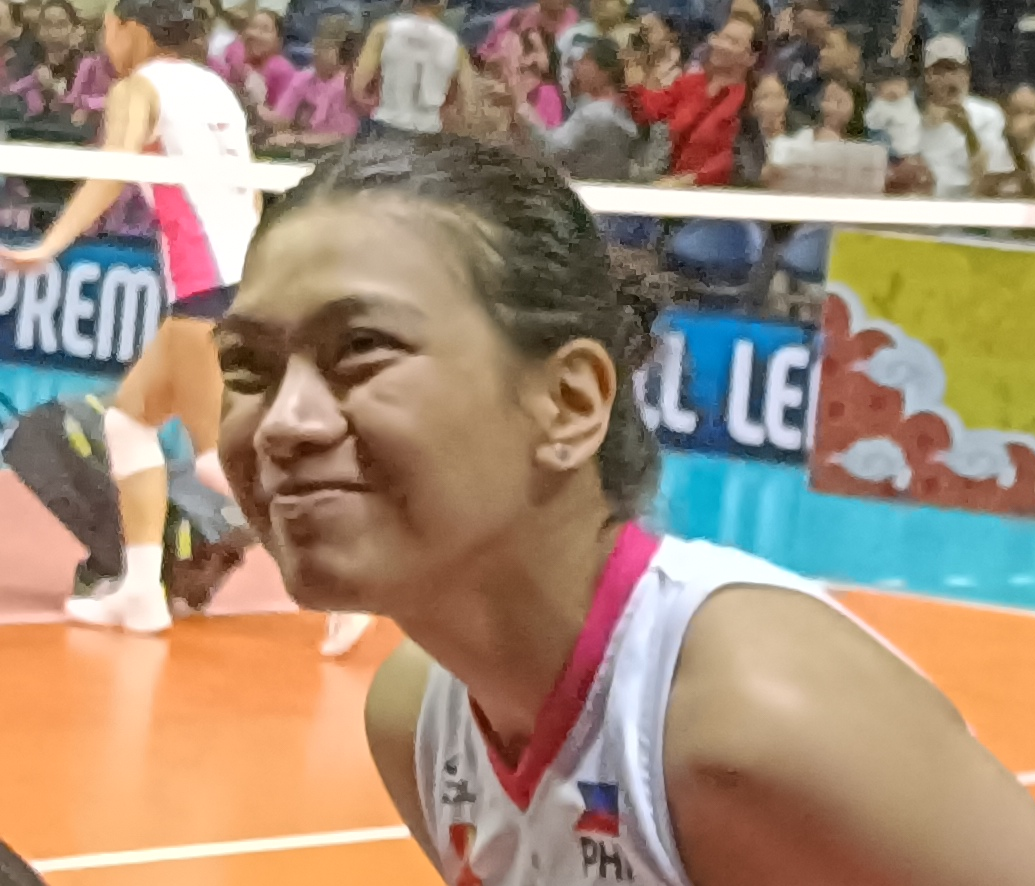
- Valdez in 2025

Personal information
- Full name: Alyssa Caymo Valdez
- Nationality: Filipino
- Born: June 29, 1993 (age 33) San Juan, Batangas, Philippines
- Education: Ateneo de Manila University
- Height: 1.72 m (5 ft 8 in)
- Weight: 50 kg (110 lb)
- Spike: 305 cm (120 in)
- Block: 280 cm (110 in)

Volleyball information
- Position: Outside hitter
- Current club: Creamline Cool Smashers
- Number: 2

Career
- Years: Team
- 2013: Smart-Maynilad
- 2014–2015: PLDT
- 2016: BaliPure
- 2016: Bureau of Customs
- 2016: 3BB Nakornnont
- 2017: Attack Line
- 2017–present: Creamline

National team
- Years: Team
- 2008–2023; 2026–present: Philippines
Honours
Women's volleyball
Representing Philippines
ASEAN Grand Prix
Bronze medal – third place	2019 Santa Rosa	Team
- Updated on October 2019

Alyssa Caymo Valdez (Tagalog: [ʔɐˈlɐjsa bɐlˈdɛs]; born June 29, 1993) is a Filipina professional volleyball player who is an outside hitter and serves as captain for the Creamline Cool Smashers of the Premier Volleyball League (PVL). She was a member of the collegiate varsity women's volleyball team of the Ateneo de Manila University in both indoor and beach volleyball, winning two UAAP championships.

== Early life ==
Alyssa Caymo Valdez was born on June 29, 1993, in San Juan, Batangas, to parents Ruel, who works in an automobile company, and Pablita, a public school teacher. She is the only daughter among four children. She learned how to play volleyball by playing with her two older brothers when she was in elementary school at the age of 12.

== Career ==
Having developed her volleyball skills, she was chosen to play in the Southern Tagalog Calabarzon Athletic Association (STCAA), a regional sports meet for elementary and high school student athletes in the Calabarzon region where she was scouted and recruited by the University of Santo Tomas (UST) to play for their high school varsity volleyball team, the UST Tigress Cubs.

In her first year at the University of Santo Tomas Junior High School, she was selected as a member of the National Capital Region (NCR) team for the Palarong Pambansa, a national sports competition for elementary and secondary students. She was UST's top high school volleyball player who led her team to several championships: three titles in UAAP (Seasons 70–72), and one in National Shakey's Girls' Volleyball League (2009). She was a three-time MVP in UAAP (Season 70–72) and once in Shakey's Girls' Volleyball League (2009).

=== Collegiate ===
Valdéz's student-athlete career reached a higher level during her college years. She garnered multiple individual awards and helped win a couple of championship titles for her college team, Ateneo Lady Eagles. She was UAAP's 4-time Best Scorer, 3-time Best Server, 3-time Season MVP, and one-time Finals MVP.

Around 2009, the coach of the Ateneo Lady Eagles Roger Gorayeb scouted Valdez.

==== 2010–2011 ====
Gorayeb was able to convince the parents of Alyssa Valdez to enroll her at the Ateneo de Manila University and play for the Lady Eagles. During the negotiations then-director Ricky Palou was only able to provide ₱3,000 allowance to Valdez but Gorayeb intending to make Valdez as the centerpiece for the Ateneo team promise to provide additional ₱2,000 himself.

Though enrolled as a freshman student in Ateneo, Valdéz had to serve a one-year residency imposed by the University Athletic Association of the Philippines for transferring from a UAAP school (UST) to another (Ateneo). During this time, she competed in the International Federal Beach Volleyball Tournament held in China together with Lady Eagle teammate Bea Tan where they finished 7th. She also played as a guest player for Ateneo in two conferences of Shakey's V-League.

The Shakey's V-League Season 7 2nd Conference marked her first game appearance with the Lady Eagles in a tournament, as a guest player. This time, she was not yet part of the 1st six. The following Season (Shakey's V-League Season 8 1st Conference), she joined the team again as a guest player and this time as a starter. Valdez won her first V-League gold medal after they beat the defending champions, the Adamson Lady Falcons, in the finals.

==== 2011–2012 ====
The first ever Open Conference of Shakey's V-League was the first tournament where Valdéz played as a regular player for Ateneo. She was one of the top scorers of the team. The Lady Eagles was the only collegiate team to enter the Final 4 and finished in 3rd place.

The Lady Eagles joined the 3rd season of Shakey's V-League Season 8 which was the Southeast Asian Club Invitational League. Valdez led the Lady Eagles in beating the club team from Malaysia in the eliminations. She had 27 points in that game.

After serving the mandatory one-year residency rule, thus making her ineligible for the UAAP Rookie of the Year award, Valdez made it to the Lady Eagles roster in UAAP Season 74 and joined the veteran players Fille Cainglet, Dzi Gervacio, Gretchen Ho, A Nacachi, and Jem Ferrer or collectively known as the Fab 5. She contributed to the team's offense and helped bring the team to the Finals. Ateneo took Game number 1 of the Finals but failed to beat the DLSU Lady Spikers in the next 2 games. In beach volleyball, together with Bea Tan and Fille Cainglet, they finished 2nd place.

In the 1st Conference of Shakey's V-League Season 9, she received her second V-League gold medal and was named the Finals MVP after they defended their title against the UST Tigresses.

==== 2012–2013 ====
In the Open Conference of Shakey's V-League Season 9, Valdez led the Ateneo team and again, they are the only collegiate team to enter the Final 4. The team got the chance to take the bronze after beating the Philippine Army Lady Troopers in 5 sets in the game 1 of the best-of-three battle for bronze. Unfortunately, due to academic reasons, some key players were absent in Game 2 and Philippine Army easily won the 2nd game in straight sets. Series were no longer extended as the Sandugo Lady Conquerors already won the title.

In UAAP Season 75, Valdéz broke the record for the most points scored in a UAAP women's volleyball game. She scored 35 points (31 spikes, 3 blocks and 1 service ace) in the second round elimination game against the Adamson Lady Falcons on January 20, 2013. The standing record before her record-breaking performance was 33 points set by an Adamson Lady Falcon, Angela Benting on February 14, 2009. She also surpassed the record of former Lady Eagle Charo Soriano which had a career high of 31 points for Ateneo. Valdez was named the Best Scorer of the season. Her scoring prowess helped the Ateneo team land again in the Finals but fell short to the defending champions, the DLSU Lady Spikers.

In the 1st Conference of Shakey's V-League Season 10, Valdez got the Best Server award. They were unsuccessful in defending their title after NU Lady Bulldogs beat them in Game 2 and 3 of the Finals.

==== 2013–2014 ====
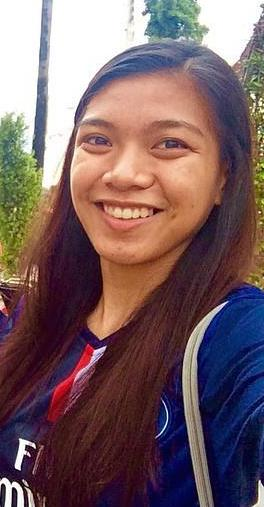
Valdez in 2014

In UAAP Season 76, Valdéz, together with Bea Tan and Michelle Morente, took the bronze medal in the beach volleyball tournament. She became the team captain of the Ateneo women's volleyball team for indoor volleyball. She was named the Best Scorer, Best Server and Season's MVP. She also won the Finals MVP award after beating the defending champions, the DLSU Lady Spikers, which had a thrice to beat advantage. Valdez was the first female volleyball athlete to win four awards in one UAAP season.

Valdéz got the Best Scorer Award again but this time, in the Shakey's V-League (11th Season Open Conference). She set a record for the most points scored in the entire conference with total of 342 points. The previous record set was 314 coming from Jaroensri Bualee.

==== 2014–2015 ====
Valdéz led the Ateneo women's volleyball team, which represented the Philippines, in the 2014 ASEAN University Games held in Palembang, Indonesia and took home the Bronze. That was the first international medal of Valdez.

In UAAP Season 77, Valdez tallied 312 points outscoring her previous season's finish. She was again awarded the Season's MVP, Best Server, and Best Scorer. They successfully defended their title against archrival DLSU Lady Spikers. They finished the season with 16–0 sweep.

In the collegiate conference of Shakey's V-League Season 12, Valdez scored a conference-high 32 points from 26 spikes, one block and five service aces against the CSB Lady Blazers during the elimination round. She was named the 1st Best Outside Spiker and Conference MVP.

After being a reserve last UAAP Season 77, Valdéz returned to beach volleyball together with Bea Tan and Jhoana Maraguinot for season 78. They finished the season in second place after falling to DLSU Lady Spikers. 2015 was one of Alyssa's most fruitful years. She repeated the bronze medal with Ateneo in the 2016 ASEAN University Games held in Indonesia.

=== Club career ===
==== Smart–Maynilad Net Spikers ====
Valdez surprised the volleyball community when she joined the Smart-Maynilad Net Spikers team in the quarterfinal round of the 2013 Shakey's V-League Season 10 Open Conference. She missed elimination round games due to her commitment with Ateneo in the UAAP beach volleyball. She got the Fittest Player of the Conference special award from one of the conference's sponsors.

==== PLDT Ultra Fast Hitters ====
Valdez joined the PLDT Home Ultera Ultra Fast Hitters club team under Coach Roger Gorayeb for Shakey's V-League Season 12 Open Conference. She matched her UAAP record, scoring 35 points from 33 attacks and 2 aces against the Philippine Army Lady Troopers in the semifinal round. She was awarded the 1st Best Outside Spiker and the Conference Most Valuable Player. Valdez won her third Championship medal in Shakey's V-League after PLDT swept the Philippine Army Lady Troopers in the Finals.

In the reinforced conference of Shakey's V-League Season 12, Valdez returned to the PLDT team on game 1 of the finals scoring 25 points from 22 attacks, 2 aces, and 1 block against the Philippine Army Lady Troopers. The team swept the finals and Valdez won her fourth Championship medal and her second Finals Most Valuable Player award in Shakey's V-League.

==== BaliPure Purest Water Defenders ====
After her UAAP career, Valdez joined the BaliPure Purest Water Defenders for the Shakey's V-League Season 13 Open Conference in a team mostly composed of former Ateneo de Manila Lady Eagles. They won the third place in the Conference. Though she missed some playing time, Alyssa Valdez still got the 1st best outside spiker.

==== Bureau of Customs Transformers ====
Valdez transferred to the Bureau of Customs Transformers a volleyball team competing in the 13th Shakey's V-League Reinforced Conference, they have a 5–2 record in the Elimination Round. They won against UP, Laoag, UST, Coast Guard and Air Force but lost against Pocari Sweat and BaliPure. With this 5–2 record the team got the third semifinals slot competing against BaliPure and they successfully made it to the finals facing Pocari Sweat lady warriors battling for the championship. In the end, they failed which resulted to a 1st runner up finish. Alyssa eventually got her 3rd Most Valuable Player award and 1st best outside spiker of the Shakey's V-League (Season 13 Reinforced Conference).

==== 3BB Nakornnont ====
Thai club, 3BB Nakornnont, announced on December 24, 2016, that they have signed up Valdez to play for them. She was to debut for 3BB Nakornnont on January 29, 2017, in her club's win over King-Bangkok but was forced to skipped a match after only receiving her International Transfer Certificate hours before the match. She debuted for her club almost a week later on February 4, 2017, in a match against Bangkok Glass, where her team lost all three sets.

==== Creamline Cool Smashers ====
For the 2017 season of the Premier Volleyball League (reinforced and open conferences), Valdez joined the expansion team, the Creamline Cool Smashers. It was during the reinforced conference when she was awarded her 4th PVL MVP award and the 1st best outside spiker award.

==== Attack Line ====
On September 11, 2017, through an interview by Gretchen Ho, Valdez was tapped to play for Attack Line, a club team in Taiwan. Valdez played for the team until December 31, 2017.

=== International ===
Valdez played for the Philippines women's national volleyball team at both the youth and senior levels.

==== Youth ====
Valdez led the eight placer Youth 16-Under Girls' Philippines National Volleyball Team in the 2008 Asian Youth Championship held in Pasig, Philippines. In 2013, she became a member of Philippines National Senior Volleyball Team. She was appointed the team captain of the Philippine team for the 2015 Asian U23 Championship.

==== Senior ====
Valdez was a member of the Philippine National team that finished in third place in the 2014 FIVB Southeast Asian Zone Qualifier held in Quang Tri, Vietnam.

In the 2015 Southeast Asian Games, she was assigned to carry the Philippine flag on the traditional parade of nations held in Singapore.

== Other ==
When the Spikers' Turf was re-established in 2018, Valdez was made president of the men's volleyball league, a fact that was only publicly announced in 2020.

== Personal life ==
Valdez was in a relationship with basketball player Kiefer Ravena from 2016 to 2022. Since 2026, she has been in a relationship with golfer and businessman Ian Umali.

== Clubs ==
- (Philippines) Smart-Maynilad Net Spikers (2013)
- (Philippines) PLDT Home Ultera Ultra Fast Hitters (2014–2015)
- (Philippines) BaliPure Purest Water Defenders (2016)
- (Philippines) Bureau of Customs Transformers (2016)
- (Thailand) 3BB Nakornnont (2016–2017)
- (Chinese Taipei) Attack Line (2017)
- (Philippines) Creamline Cool Smashers (2017–present)

== Awards ==
=== Individual ===
Premier Volleyball League

- Most Valuable Player (3) – 2017 Reinforced, 2018 Open, 2019 Reinforced
- Finals Most Valuable Player – 2022 Open
- 1st Best Outside Hitter (7) – 2017 Reinforced, 2018 Reinforced, 2018 Open, 2021 Open, 2022 Invitational, 2022 Reinforced, 2025 On Tour
- 2nd Best Outside Hitter (2) – 2019 Reinforced, 2023 Invitational

Shakey's V-League

- Most Valuable Player (3) – 2015 Open, 2015 Collegiate, 2016 Reinforced Open
- Finals Most Valuable Player (2) – 2012 First Conference, 2015 Reinforced Open
- 1st Best Outside Hitter (4) – 2015 Open, 2015 Collegiate, 2016 Open, 2016 Reinforced Open
- Best Scorer – 2014 Open
- Best Server – 2013 First Conference

UAAP women's volleyball

- Most Valuable Player (3) – 2014 (Season 76), 2015 (Season 77), 2016 (Season 78)
- Finals Most Valuable Player – 2014 (Season 76)
- Best Scorer (4) – 2013 (Season 75), 2014 (Season 76), 2015 (Season 77), 2016 (Season 78)
- Best Server (3) – 2014 (Season 76), 2015 (Season 77), 2016 (Season 78)

UAAP girls' volleyball

- Most Valuable Player (3) – 2007 (Season 70), 2008 (Season 71), 2009 (Season 72)
- Best Scorer – 2006 (Season 69)
- Best Attacker – 2009 (Season 72)
- Rookie of the Year – 2006 (Season 69)

Shakey's Girls Volleyball League

- Best Attacker (National) (2) – 2009, 2010
- Most Valuable Player (NCR) – 2009
- Best Attacker (NCR) (3) – 2008, 2009, 2010

=== Collegiate ===
- 2011 Shakey's V-League Season 8: 1st Conference – Champions, with Ateneo De Manila University Lady Eagles
- 2011 Shakey's V-League Season 8: Open Conference – Bronze medal, with Ateneo De Manila University Lady Eagles
- 2012 UAAP Season 74 volleyball tournaments – Silver medal, with Ateneo De Manila University Lady Eagles
- 2012 Shakey's V-League Season 9: 1st Conference – Champions, with Ateneo De Manila University Lady Eagles
- 2013 UAAP Season 75 volleyball tournaments – Silver medal, with Ateneo De Manila University Lady Eagles
- 2013 Shakey's V-League Season 10: 1st Conference – Silver medal, with Ateneo De Manila University Lady Eagles
- 2014 UAAP Season 76 volleyball tournaments – Champions, with Ateneo De Manila University Lady Eagles
- 2014 ASEAN University Games – Bronze medal, with Ateneo De Manila University Lady Eagles
- 2015 UAAP Season 77 volleyball tournaments – Champions, with Ateneo De Manila University Lady Eagles
- 2015 Shakey's V-League Season 12: Collegiate Conference – Silver medal, with Ateneo De Manila University Lady Eagles
- 2016 UAAP Season 78 volleyball tournaments – Silver medal, with Ateneo De Manila University Lady Eagles
- 2016 ASEAN University Games – Bronze medal, with Ateneo De Manila University Lady Eagles

=== Club ===
- 2013 Shakey's V-League Open Conference – Silver medal, with Smart-Maynilad Net Spikers
- 2015 Shakey's V-League Open Conference – Champions, with PLDT Home Ultera Ultra Fast Hitters
- 2015 Shakey's V-League Reinforced Open Conference – Champions, with PLDT Home Ultera Ultra Fast Hitters
- 2016 Shakey's V-League Open Conference – Bronze medal, with BaliPure Purest Water Defenders
- 2016 Shakey's V-League Reinforced Open Conference – Silver medal, with Bureau of Customs Transformers
- 2017 Women's Volleyball Thai-Denmark Super League – Bronze medal, with 3BB Nakornnont
- 2017 Premier Volleyball League Reinforced Conference – Bronze medal, with Creamline Cool Smashers
- 2017 Premier Volleyball League Open Conference – Bronze medal, with Creamline Cool Smashers
- 2018 Premier Volleyball League Reinforced Conference – Champions, with Creamline Cool Smashers
- 2018 Premier Volleyball League Open Conference – Champions, with Creamline Cool Smashers
- 2019 Premier Volleyball League Reinforced Conference – Silver, with Creamline Cool Smashers
- 2019 Premier Volleyball League Open Conference – Champions, with Creamline Cool Smashers
- 2021 Premier Volleyball League Open Conference – Silver, with Creamline Cool Smashers
- 2022 Premier Volleyball League Open Conference – Champions, with Creamline Cool Smashers
- 2022 Premier Volleyball League Invitational Conference – Champions, with Creamline Cool Smashers
- 2022 Premier Volleyball League Reinforced Conference – Bronze medal, with Creamline Cool Smashers
- 2023 Premier Volleyball League First All-Filipino Conference - Champions, with Creamline Cool Smashers
- 2023 Premier Volleyball League Invitational Conference – Silver, with Creamline Cool Smashers
- 2023 Premier Volleyball League Second All-Filipino Conference – Champions, with Creamline Cool Smashers
- 2024 Premier Volleyball League All-Filipino Conference – Champions, with Creamline Cool Smashers
- 2024 Premier Volleyball League Reinforced Conference – Champions, with Creamline Cool Smashers
- 2024 Premier Volleyball League Invitational Conference – Champions, with Creamline Cool Smashers
- 2025 Premier Volleyball League on Tour" - Bronze medal, with Creamline
- 2025 Premier Volleyball League Invitational Conference" - Bronze medal, with Creamline
- 2026 Premier Volleyball League All-Filipino Conference" - Gold medal, with Creamline

=== Special recognitions ===
- Most Trusted Sportsperson by Reader's Digest 2024
- FLAME awardee by Sports Awards 2024 ( one of the 1st winners )
- Most Trusted Sportsperson by Reader's Digest 2023
- Push Sports Personality (Push Awards 2018)
- Push Sports Personality (Push Awards 2017)
- Most Popular Sports Personality (Push Awards 2016)
- Fittest Player of the Conference
- 2016 UAAP Season 78 "Athlete of the Year"
- Miss Volleyball 2016 (Philippine Sportswriters Association)
- Fudgee Barr O-Barr Sa Galing Player of the Season
- Ten Sports Heroes of 2015: Sportsmen Who Change The Game (Spin.ph)
- Miss Volleyball 2015 (Philippine Sportswriters Association)
- Lifestyle's 29 Bright and Beautiful (Philippine Star)
- Miss Volleyball 2014 (Philippine Sportswriters Association)
- Female Athlete of the Year (Best of 2014 PExers Choice Awards)
- Woman of Style and Substance (People Asia 2014)
- Volleywood World Female Idol 2013 1st Runner Up (Volleywood.net)
- Miss Volleyball 2013 (Philippine Sportswriters Association)
- Best Pinoy Athlete (Rappler Social Media Awards: Best Of 2013)
- BioFit Tea Fittest Player of the Conference (Shakey's V-League 10th Season Open Conference)
- 2008 UAAP Season 71 "Athlete of the Year"

== Filmography ==
=== Film ===
Year	Title	Role	Notes
2019	My Letters to Happy	Cindy	
2023	Rookie	Herself	Cameo

=== Television ===
Year	Title	Role	Notes
2019	Celebrity Buff	Herself	Contestant
2021	Pinoy Big Brother: Kumunity Season 10 – Celebrity Edition	Herself	Contestant
2024	Family Feud	Herself	Contestant
2025	Tropang G.O.A.T.	Herself	

== In popular media ==
Valdez appeared in Digital 5's online reality show Phenoms together with basketball player and ex-boyfriend Kiefer Ravena. They had a relationship that lasted from 2016 until 2022. She finished her undergraduate degree major in psychology in 2015 and is now working on her master's degree in communications. She appeared in Ang Panday with Coco Martin and Rhian Ramos. Valdez currently has over one million followers on Instagram and Twitter, making her one of the most followed volleyball players in the whole world.

In October 2021, Valdez became a part of the 10th season of the reality TV show Pinoy Big Brother as a celebrity housemate, having previously entered as a houseguest to teach volleyball to the teen housemates in its 8th season in 2019. In January 2022, she became one of the Top 2 housemates of the Celebrity Edition together with Anji Salvacion. However, due to prior commitments leading to the 2021 Southeast Asian Games in Vietnam, Valdez withdrew from the show and was replaced by beauty queen and fellow housemate Samantha Bernardo.
