= Pinoy Big Brother: Kumunity Season 10 – Celebrity Edition =

Pinoy Big Brother: Kumunity Season 10 Celebrity Edition
- Season 10
- Title card for the Celebrity Edition
- Hosted by: Toni Gonzaga; Bianca Gonzalez; Robi Domingo
- No. of days: 78
- No. of housemates: 17
- Top 2: Alyssa Valdez; Anji Salvacion
- Companion show: Kumulitan, Kumunity: G sa Gabi, and Kumulitan Weekends (online via Kumu)

Release
- Original network: Kapamilya Channel
- Original release: October 16, 2021 – January 1, 2022

Season chronology
- ← Previous; Connect (Overall) Next → Kumunity Season 10: Adult Edition (In season)

The celebrity edition of Pinoy Big Brother: Kumunity Season 10 premiered on Kapamilya Channel, Jeepney TV and A2Z on October 16, 2021. The first edition in the multi-part season, this edition featured contestants (known as Housemates) from the Celebrity Kumunity (portumentau of Kumu and community), which was composed of people with a claim to fame.

The edition concluded on January 1, 2022, where Alyssa Valdez and Anji Salvacion were hailed as the edition's Top 2 housemates. Salvacion would go on to win the season, becoming the first celebrity to win since Daniel Matsunaga of All In.

== Production ==
=== Housemate selection ===
Like other celebrity editions, no formal auditions were held to determine this edition's roster of housemates.

=== Online Bahay ni Kuya ===
Throughout the run-up to the editions' premiere, a Kumu campaign was held to determine two celebrity housemates. This campaign was called Online Bahay ni Kuya ("Online Big Brother's House") and it consisted of online voting and challenges to its participants. Jordan Andrews and Benedix Ramos were announced as the winners of the campaign on October 15 and entered the house as official housemates.

== Overview ==
=== The House ===
The facade of the Big Brother House was repainted with the colors of the Philippine flag. As the season started during the Filipino countdown to Christmas, the façade featured decorations such as lights and parol lanterns.

=== Theme songs ===
A cover of Toni Gonzaga and Sam Milby's "Sikat ang Pinoy" by the OPM band Agsunta and Pinoy rapper Kritiko was used alongside "Pinoy Tayo" in this edition.

The eviction theme song for this edition is entitled "Piece Of The Puzzle", written and performed by Trisha Denise Campañer.

=== Twists ===
- Online Bahay Ni Kuya – Kumu users will have the chance to become official housemates after finishing several online tasks via Kumu prepared by the show.
- Nomination Immunity Pass – A power given to winners of tasks or challenges held on or before their Kumunity's stay in the house, this will give its holder the option to give themselves immunity for a round of their choosing.
  - Follower Sprint – An online live stream challenge wherein the housemate who had gained the most number of new followers on Kumu will be given a Nomination Immunity Pass.
- Kumunity Decides! – Kumu users, through an online poll on the app on the shows daily livestream, can drop virtual gifts to a housemate of their choice via Kumu's gifting system and are collectively given a power to decide and give a certain challenge(s), task(s), or advantage(s) to a/the housemate(s) who had received the highest number of vote(s).
- Head of Household – Carried over from the previous season, those who earned the title were granted immunity from being nominated in the upcoming nomination week.
  - Padaluck – Also used in the previous season, the public has the chance to give an advantage to a housemate. The advantage was given to the housemate who had received the most "padalucks" or virtual gifts through Kumu's livestream gifting system.
- Powers – Various housemates from the Celebrity and Adult Kumunities were given powers for completing tasks given by Big Brother, such as by giving them special and secret tasks, and the Follower Sprint task.
- Houseguest for a Week – The top Kumu live streamer who will earn the most Kumu gifts on November 6 to 12, 2021 during the Celebrity Edition will become a houseguest for a week.
- Unli-Voting – From the second to the eighth evictions, the public is given the power to vote past the voting limit through SMS and Kumu for the 48 hours preceding the closing of the poll. It was discontinued on the final week of the edition in response to the twist's poor reception.
- Pinoy Big Brother Games 2021 – The housemates were divided into three teams, and the team with the most points earned after three rounds of games will earn immunity from the sixth celebrity nominations.
- Kuya's Christmas Elf – One of the top 10 Kumu streamers will become Big Brother's Christmas elf. As an elf, he or she is going to deliver to the housemates their given tasks and some of Big Brother's messages virtually or in person.
- The Ten Million Diamonds Challenge – The Final 5 housemates of the edition will compete to earn a portion of the ten million diamonds in order to help themselves from getting evicted in their respective final evictions, and to become one of the Top 2 of their respective Kumunities.

== Housemates ==
The housemates for the season was incrementally revealed daily in the show's social media accounts from October 6, 2021, to October 16, 2021, and were revealed daily on the show's social media accounts; the first batch of celebrity housemates were revealed October 6, with the last batch being revealed on October 9. On October 14, it was revealed that three more celebrity housemates are yet to be named.

During the launch night, it was announced via the show's Kumu livestream that Kyle Echarri will enter the House after completing his quarantine; together with Chie Filomeno, though at different intervals, they entered on October 20. Albie Casiño entered on October 27 while the two celebrity live streamers (Jordan Andrews and Benedix Ramos) were also introduced.

List of Pinoy Big Brother: Kumunity Season 10 celebrity housemates
Name	Age on Entry	Hometown	Notability	Day entered	Day exited	Result	Ref.
Alyssa Valdez	28	Batangas	Professional volleyball player	Day 1	Day 78	Celebrity Top 2	
Anji Salvacion	19	Surigao del Norte	Singer	Day 1	Day 78	Celebrity Top 2	
Samantha Bernardo	28	Palawan	Beauty queen	Day 1	Day 77	Evicted	
Brenda Mage	32	Cagayan de Oro	Comedian and vlogger	Day 1	Day 77	Evicted	
Madam Inutz	36	Cavite	Online seller and vlogger	Day 1	Day 77	Evicted	
Alexa Ilacad	21	Pasig	Actress and singer	Day 1	Day 71	Evicted	
KD Estrada	19	Parañaque	Musician	Day 1	Day 71	Evicted	
Jordan Andrews	31	London, UK	Theatre actor and online streamer	Day 19	Day 64	Evicted	
Eian Rances	28	Quezon	Actor and online streamer	Day 1	Day 64	Evicted	
Shanaia Gomez	19	Quezon City	Actress	Day 1	Day 57	Evicted	
Benedix Ramos	27	Pangasinan	Content creator	Day 17	Day 57	Evicted	
Karen Bordador	33	Makati	Radio disc jockey and vlogger	Day 1	Day 51	Evicted	
TJ Valderrama	35	Manila	Comedian	Day 1	Day 51	Evicted	
Kyle Echarri	18	Cebu	Actor and singer	Day 5	Day 43	Evicted	
Chie Filomeno	25	Rizal	Actress and model	Day 5	Day 36	Evicted	
Albie Casiño	28	Quezon City	Actor	Day 12	Day 29	Evicted	
John Adajar	30	Laguna	Mixed martial artist and model	Day 1	Day 22	Evicted	

- Alyssa Valdez: A volleyball player known as the "Heartstrong Phenom of Batangas", her friendship with Samantha was adored by viewers, gaining the nickname of "SamLy" in the process. She was the sole housemate from the edition to not get nominated.
- Anji Salvacion: A signer of Russian descent called the "Singing Sweetheart of Siargao", her personality polarized viewers as she gained a lot of supporters with her passionate character, singing ability, and strong performance in tasks, while simultaneously getting a lot of critics due to her antagonistic approach towards KD, resentment towards Alexa for helping out KD after she told him that "there will never be a chance", and allegedly benefitting from management favoritism
- Samantha Bernardo: Called the "Bread Queen-er of Palawan", she was very popular with viewers whether it be for her friendship with Alyssa, or for her helping out KD during his struggles in the earlier part of the edition.
- Daisy "Madam Inutz" Lopez: Known as the "Mama-bentang Live Seller of Cavite", her feisty personality was initially loved by viewers, especially with her nominating Chie for allegedly contributing nothing but her beauty. The viewers cooled off on her during the latter portion of the edition due to her involvement in the Alexa-Brenda-Eian love triangle as well as her manager single-handedly saving her from eviction
- Brenda Mage: Billed as the "Fun-Along Comedian of Cagayan de Oro", he was known for his strong performance in tasks as well as his controversial personality inside the house owing to a romantic interest with Eian causing him to constantly bump heads with Alexa in the process
- Alexa Ilacad: A longtime ABS-CBN actress called the "Smartista Unica Hija of Pasig", her stay in the PBB house was mostly known for a conflict with Albie over peanut butter, discussing her mental health, conflicts with Eian and Brenda, and her helping KD as he was struggling after consecutive nominations and being turned down by Anji
- KD Estrada: A musician called the "Musical Wonder Boy of Parañaque", he badly struggled in the early portion of the edition owing to depression and anxiety as he was nominated three straight times, was turned down by Anji, and walked out after he found out that he was nominated for a third week in a row. Despite those struggles, housemates like Alexa and Samantha helped him adjust and recover afterwards, and he was visibly in better shape on the latter half of the edition.
- Jordan Andrews: Called the "Musical Dreamchaser of London", he was mildly popular among viewers but garnered criticism for being "boring"
- Eian Rances: Billed as the "Striving Streamer of Quezon", he was a controversial housemate due to his relationships with Alexa and Brenda, allegedly "using" the former once he found out that she was popular with the viewers
- TJ Valderrama: Dubbed the "Laughter Lodi of Manila", he was very unpopular with the viewers for manipulating Anji and KD, as well as being seen inappropriately touching Shanaia several times in a Kumu livestream, which lead to calls for him to be force-evicted. He was the only housemate to get a negative vote tally for the entire edition.
- Kyle Echarri: An actor and signer who was a core member of the "Gold Squad" prior to entering the PBB house, his stay alienated fans of his tandem with Francine Diaz, known as "KyCine", after Kyle became close with Chie. He also got criticized for accusing KD of "copying his style" days prior to his eviction

=== Subsequent events ===
Alyssa Valdez, chose to relinquish her spot in the Biga-10 on Day 197. She made the decision as a result of her prior commitments as part of the Philippines women's national volleyball team, which will compete in the 2021 Southeast Asian Games, conflicting with the schedule allotted for the Biga-10's stay in the house. Samantha, by virtue of having the next most votes in the final eviction poll, took her place in the Biga-10 and the Celebrity Top 2 as a result.

Brenda and Madam Inutz were selected to compete for a wildcard spot in the Biga-10.

== Houseguests ==
=== Online Guesting ===
- Day 22: Lucky 7 Big Winner Maymay Entrata had a dance number with the celebrity housemates after they were tasked to do a choreography for her song "Amakabogera."
- Day 28: AC Bonifacio promoted her new single under Star Magic Records entitled "Fool No Mo" by playing its music video for the housemates and, through a recorded video message, told them to put a bandage and share a story about how they overcame an adversity and healed from it.
- Day 33: 2020 Tokyo Olympics silver medalist Nesthy Petecio gave a message to the housemates, and then declared the Pinoy Big Brother Games 2021 open.
- Day 34: 2020 Tokyo Olympics bronze medalist Eumir Marcial sent a good luck greeting to the housemates before their land swimming competition in the Pinoy Big Brother Games 2021.
- Day 57: AC Bonifacio and former 737 regular housemate Zeus Collins were invited by Big Brother to judge the housemates' performance for their Sikat ang Sayaw ng Pinoy weekly task.
- Day 67: For winning the Kuya's Christmas Elf Kumu Campaign, US-based Alyssa "Ysang" Ramos became Big Brother's house elf for a week.
- Day 75: Ogie Diaz hosted the final tell all of the Celebrity Final 5 together with this season's former Celebrity housemates.

=== Physical Guesting ===
- Day 54: For winning the Houseguest for a Week Kumu Campaign, Aly Palma spent a week in the House to help the housemates with the Sikat ang Sayaw ng Pinoy weekly task.

== Tasks ==
=== Weekly tasks ===
Task No.	Date given	Task title and description	Result
Celebrities
1	October 17 (Day 2)	Pa-Mine Pa More (I'll Take More); The housemates were tasked to sell online all the 500 items given throughout the week. They were given the discretion in how much they will price the items. During the live online selling, the housemates were only allowed to sell once the bell sound was played and were only allotted 3 hours per day to do the task. Also as a reward for the task, the amount they will earn will be given to their loved ones or their chosen charity. At the end of the task, the housemates had earned ₱21,740; they chose to give the entire earnings to the female BJMP detainees where Karen was previously incarcerated.	Passed
2	October 25 (Day 9)	Takot ang Pinoy (Pinoy is Afraid); The housemates have to create, write, and produce a live 30-minute horror musical play. As part of the twist for this task, two of the major characters of their play were selected via Kumunity Decides, and the result thereof was only revealed minutes before the start of the said play. To win this task, they need to get a total of 80,000 average viewers across Facebook, Kumu and Kapamilya Online Live. Total average viewership: Facebook / Kumu / Kapamilya Online Live / Total; 3,675 / 43,896 / 58,423 / 105,994	Passed
3	November 3 (Day 19)	Tumba Table (Tippy Table); Similar to the Otso season's Batch-Bakan Challenge, one at a time, the housemates had to place 170 blocks on a hanging but unstable table. If ever a block falls or tumbles on or off the table, they will have to restock their blocks from the start. Only one pair of housemates at a time can place each of their blocks on the table. They will need to stock all blocks in a standing or horizontal position and they must finish this task within one hour.	Failed
4	November 9 (Day 25)	Sa Linyang Kainan (Online Restaurant); The housemates were tasked to cook and serve two specialty dishes of their own choice: one Filipino dish and one international dish (they chose Sisig and Ramen). The dishes will be served in a pre-order basis and will be made available to all Metro Manila residents only. The show had partnered with Grab Express for the delivery of the dishes they have prepared. One of the basis to determine if they will be successful with this task is from the customers' feedbacks (the housemates must gain at least 1000 aggregate star rating). The proceeds from the income they have earned from this task, including the online livestream jam, will be given to the Philippine Mental Health Association.	Passed
5	The housemates were given their fifth weekly task while they were also participating in the Pinoy Big Brother Games 2021. However, the entire task was not broadcast by the show and was only partially streamed via Kumu. The entire mechanics and the outcome of this weekly task remained unknown.		
6	November 23 (Day 39)	PBB Arcade; For the entire week, the housemates must be able to earn a total of 100 tickets by playing games prepared by Big Brother. In addition to this, they were also instructed to freeze themselves and act as toys (while wearing their toy costumes) when they will hear the sound of a "person walking," as if they were being checked by such person (which was revealed to be the housemates' loved-ones). This is akin to the Toy Story movie franchise wherein the toys don't move when any human is around. They will only be allowed to move once the same sound will be played to them again. Also, at the start of the day, a "magical sound" will be played to alert them that they have to don immediately their toy costumes. In any instance where each of them had moved despite the sound is being played, one violation will be given. And per violation, one ticket will be deducted from them. The games of PBB Arcade: No. / Date given / Game title and description / Player(s) / Tickets earned / Total tickets; 1 / Nov. 23 (Day 39) / Soccer Arcade; The housemates must hit the target by kicking a soccer ball. They will earn 1 ticket per hit. One at a time, they must continuously kick the balls given to them; they are not allowed to let the balls gather at the kicking area. Also, the ball must not cross the yellow line. Every time they will violate the game rules, a violation will be given to them. Each of them are only allowed to play the game for 5 minutes. / Kyle / 17 tickets^{1} / 8 tickets; 1 / Nov. 23 (Day 39) / Soccer Arcade; The housemates must hit the target by kicking a soccer ball. They will earn 1 ticket per hit. One at a time, they must continuously kick the balls given to them; they are not allowed to let the balls gather at the kicking area. Also, the ball must not cross the yellow line. Every time they will violate the game rules, a violation will be given to them. Each of them are only allowed to play the game for 5 minutes. / Alexa / -18 tickets^{1} / 8 tickets; 1 / Nov. 23 (Day 39) / Soccer Arcade; The housemates must hit the target by kicking a soccer ball. They will earn 1 ticket per hit. One at a time, they must continuously kick the balls given to them; they are not allowed to let the balls gather at the kicking area. Also, the ball must not cross the yellow line. Every time they will violate the game rules, a violation will be given to them. Each of them are only allowed to play the game for 5 minutes. / KD / 9 tickets^{1} / 8 tickets; 2 / Nov. 23 (Day 39) / Soccer Arcade; The housemates must hit the target by kicking a soccer ball. They will earn 1 ticket per hit. One at a time, they must continuously kick the balls given to them; they are not allowed to let the balls gather at the kicking area. Also, the ball must not cross the yellow line. Every time they will violate the game rules, a violation will be given to them. Each of them are only allowed to play the game for 5 minutes. / Eian / -5 tickets^{2} / 39 tickets; 2 / Nov. 23 (Day 39) / Soccer Arcade; The housemates must hit the target by kicking a soccer ball. They will earn 1 ticket per hit. One at a time, they must continuously kick the balls given to them; they are not allowed to let the balls gather at the kicking area. Also, the ball must not cross the yellow line. Every time they will violate the game rules, a violation will be given to them. Each of them are only allowed to play the game for 5 minutes. / Jordan / 23 tickets^{2} / 39 tickets; 2 / Nov. 23 (Day 39) / Soccer Arcade; The housemates must hit the target by kicking a soccer ball. They will earn 1 ticket per hit. One at a time, they must continuously kick the balls given to them; they are not allowed to let the balls gather at the kicking area. Also, the ball must not cross the yellow line. Every time they will violate the game rules, a violation will be given to them. Each of them are only allowed to play the game for 5 minutes. / Shanaia / 13 tickets^{2} / 39 tickets; 2 / Nov. 23 (Day 39) / Soccer Arcade; The housemates must hit the target by kicking a soccer ball. They will earn 1 ticket per hit. One at a time, they must continuously kick the balls given to them; they are not allowed to let the balls gather at the kicking area. Also, the ball must not cross the yellow line. Every time they will violate the game rules, a violation will be given to them. Each of them are only allowed to play the game for 5 minutes. / Anji / 8 tickets^{2} / 39 tickets; 3 / Nov. 24 (Day 40) / Balloon Dart Game; While being blindfolded, a housemate must burst balloons using a dart spear. To guide the blindfolded housemate, four housemates will serve as human directional buttons (when they are being pressed, the human directional buttons will call out their designated direction). Another housemate will also serve as the operator of the human directional buttons; he or she will also be tasked to press the "go button" to signal the blindfolded housemate to burst a balloon by using a dart spear. They are only given 20 tries to finish this game. / All male housemates^{3} / 17 tickets / 17 tickets; 4 / Nov. 24 (Day 40) / / All female housemates^{4} / 17 tickets / 17 tickets; 5 / Nov. 25 (Day 41) / Soccer and Balloon Dart Arcade; For their last game, the game will be divided in two parts. For the first part, taking turns, each of them will have to kick a soccer ball to hit the designated target. If the target is hit, he or she will then have to proceed to the next part wherein he has to control and guide another housemate to burst a balloon using the same spear used in the second game. He will earn 2 tickets if he or she correctly bursts a red balloon, while 2 tickets will be deducted if he or she will burst a black balloon. They all have 30 minutes to play this game. At the start of the game, the housemates had already got 31 violations earned from the freeze task. This will be deducted in their total tickets earned from the 5 games played. / All housemates / 100 tickets / 69 tickets (31 tickets were already deducted); Total aggregate tickets / / / / / 150 tickets	Passed
7	December 3 (Day 49)	Reunited; Using their blocks, each team will need to meet halfway in the activity area using their blocks as pathways. After meeting at the center, all them must build a three layer platform that should be able to fit them all in it. They will not be reunited if cannot hold at the platform for 30 seconds, or finish the task for more than an hour. If they are successful with this task, the housemates will be reunited and they will be able to win their weekly budget.	Passed
8	December 6 (Day 52)^{5}	Sikat ang Sayaw ng Pinoy (Pinoy Dance is Famous); The housemates must be able to create a dance choreography to the tune of their edition's theme song "Sikat ang Pinoy." In their choreography, it must include dance steps from ballroom, hiphop and folkdance. Each housemate must also be able to contribute a dance step to their entire choreography. For their final performance, all of them will be required to wear headphones with one housemate being selected to wear a headphone that plays the distorted or off-tempo version of the song. Also, in the event they committed three mistakes in one round, they have three chances to perform the dance presentation all over again. To win this task, they must receive a total score of not less than 88% from the guest judges. The results of Sikat ang Sayaw ng Pinoy dance weekly task: Criteria / AC Bonifacio / Zeus Collins / Total Average; Choreography / 30% / 29% / 29.5%; Synchronization & Coordination / 20% / 25% / 22.5%; Overall Performance / 39% / 25% / 37%; Total Average Score / / / 89%	Passed
9	December 14 (Day 60)	Makuha Ka Sa Tingin (You Get to Look); With their cone-shaped masks on throughout the task, the housemates segregated into three groups must get the giant puzzle pieces from the garden and pool areas (for Baby Jesus) and within the activity area (for Mary and Joseph), and bring them to the activity area where they will build the rectangular puzzle of a character from the Nativity scene: Baby Jesus, Mary, and Joseph. If completed, not only the housemates will receive their weekly budget, they will give the amount of one hundred thousand Philippine pesos (PHP 100,000) for the Philippine Accessible Disability Services, Inc. (PADS), this season's second beneficiary. The outcome of Makuha Ka Sa Tingin weekly task: Character / Twist / Outcome; Baby Jesus / All housemates will solve the puzzle with their cone masks with a tiny hole at the cone's sharp tip. / Completed; Joseph / Only Madam Inutz, Alyssa, and Samantha will be wearing the same cone masks from earlier, while all other housemates will be wearing red-nosed cone masks obstructing the entrance of light. Therefore, making it more difficult to finish solving the puzzle. / Completed; Mary / All housemates will solve the puzzle with their red-nosed cone masks similar to what the other housemates wore in the Joseph puzzle. / Completed	Passed
10	December 22 (Day 68)	Andito Tayo Para Sa Isa't Isa (English: We Are Here For Each Other); The housemates will dress as reindeers to deliver a large Christmas gift. In the activity area, a 14-layered Christmas tree has to be stacked using green cups and a yellow cup (to evoke the star on the Christmas tree-top) on top of the cart, to which they will pull around the house-shaped route. To complete the challenge, they must turn around for a hundred times without letting the cups fall; otherwise, they must return and redo from the starting point. Once completed, they will be able to give one hundred thousand Philippine pesos (PHP 100,000) to the families and communities affected by Typhoon Odette.	Passed

Notes

1. A total of 21 game violations were earned during Kyle's turn to play the game. He was able to get 38 hits which gave him to earn a total of 17 tickets. For Alexa, she earned 22 hits while incurring 40 game violations. This gave her -18 tickets. KD, on the other hand, was able to make 33 hits while earning 24 game violations. He earned a total of 9 tickets. For the first round of the Soccer Arcade, all in all, they earned 8 tickets.
2. For the second round of the Soccer Arcade, Eian was able to make a total of -5 tickets from the 18 hits and the 23 game violations he had earned. For Jordan, he earned 27 hits while incurring only 4 game violations. This gave him 23 tickets. Shanaia, on the other hand, was able to make 22 hits while earning 9 game violations. She earned a total of 13 tickets. For the last game for this round, Anji was able to make 22 hits while earning 14 game violations; she earned a total of 8 tickets. All in all, they earned 39 tickets.
3. Kyle was selected not to participate since all the positions in the game were already filled.
4. Shanaia was selected not to participate since all the positions in the game were already filled.
5. Benedix and Shanaia were in the house when the task was performed. The episode for this task was aired on December 12, 2021. The celebrity housemates received the total average score of 89% from the judges.

=== Other tasks ===
Task No.	Date given	Type	Task title and description	Participants	Result
Celebrities
1	October 16 (Day 1)	Reward task	Shopping Task; The housemates were informed that the ambag bags they brought with them contained Big coins, and these coins were the equivalent of the diamonds they have earned from the live stream tasks done via Kumu. Each 10,000 diamonds earned is equivalent to one Big coin. Later, they were instructed to place all their coins into the glass container found in the living area; in total they have earned 61.9 million diamonds which is equivalent 6,190 coins. At the activity area, the housemates were grouped into three based on the choronological order of their introductions, and were tasked to shop the furniture and all the other items they need to use inside the House using the coins they have earned. Each group were only given 100 seconds to shop. Each group must select an envelope which will determine the kind of "human container" they had to use for the task. The outcome of the Shopping Task: Group No. / Members / Human container used / Amount spent; Beginning balance / / / 6,190 Big coins; 1 / Madam Inutz, Brenda, & TJ / Shopping cart / 2,300 Big coins; 2 / Anji, KD, & Shanaia / Human eco bag / 875 Big coins; 3 / Samantha, Eian, & Alexa / Human shopping basket / 1,875 Big coins; 4 / John, Alyssa, & Karen / Human eco bag / 675 Big coins; Total Big coins spent / / / 5,675 Big coins; Ending balance / / / 515 Big coins^{1}	All housemates	Passed
2	October 17 (Day 2)	Kumunity Decides	Kumunity Pantry; Similar to the community pantry concept that was greatly applied by many communities across the country during the pandemic, Alyssa was tasked to get the housemates' food supplies. She was only allowed to get enough food supplies that could feed all of the 12 housemates that day. She was allowed to get some help—she chose Anji. As a surprise, Alyssa and Anji were also tasked to cook all their meals for that day. Unknown to Alyssa, this task was chosen by Kumu users via Kumunity Decides.	Alyssa and Anji	Passed
3	October 25 (Day 18)	Punishment task	Due to their high number of violations while in the house, Big Brother kicked out the celebrity housemates in the house and were tasked to stay in a prison cell-like room in the activity area until the time given by Big Brother.	All housemates	Passed
4	October 25 (Day 18)	Punishment task	The female housemates (excluding Alexa) were told to create a total of 250 small wooden blocks as preparation for their next weekly task.	All female housemates	Passed
5	October 25 (Day 18)	Punishment task	In order to for the celebrity housemates to leave the jail-like room, they are told to pass one object from one housemate to another for 10 minutes while also saying their promise to not repeat the violation that they have created (e.g. I will not [name of violation committed]).	All housemates	Passed
6	October 25 (Day 18)	Secret task	Newcomer housemate Benedix was told to be the main officer of the prison cell-like room while keeping his housemate status a secret while the current housemates are staying and facing their respective punishments.	Benedix	Passed
7	November 3 (Day 19)	Secret reward task	Tumba Table Practice; John was tasked to gather four housemates to practice the tumba table weekly task. Within 2 hours, the five of them (including John) must be able to make 35 wooden blocks to stand on the hanging unstable table. Unknown to John, the reward for this task is a recorded video from his live-in partner (his fiancée) and their child.	John	Passed
8	November 8 (Day 24)	Secret reward task	Alyssa was tasked to make a surprise virtual birthday dinner for Samantha and her mom. She was also tasked to cook Samantha's favorite dishes without her knowing anything.	Alyssa	Passed
9	November 9 (Day 25)	Secret reward task	Brenda was tasked to act as an English teacher. Successfully finishing this task will give Alexa a graduation pictorial, which will be done inside the House.	Brenda	Passed
10	November 18 (Day 34)	Secret task	Kumu-sikahan Jamming Night; Alyssa, Alexa, Anji, KD and Samantha were tasked to prepare a live music jam streaming and earn 500,000 Kumu diamonds for Madam Inutz's pre-birthday celebration; if they decided to have a birthday drink, they must need to earn 1 million diamonds to get the said drinks. KD was given a special task to compose a song for Madam Inutz for which the both of them must sing in the live stream.	Alyssa, Alexa, Anji, KD, and Samantha	Passed
11	November 19 (Day 35)	Secret reward task	Madam Inutz must dress and act as Alexa's mother without Alexa knowing. If successful, Alexa will be able to have a video call with her mother.	Madam Inutz	Passed
12	November 22 (Day 38)	Secret task	Wearing costumes as if they are human-sized toys, Alyssa, Benedix, Eian, Karen, KD, Shanaia, and TJ were tasked to not move when Brenda is around with them. If any of them will move, or if Brenda somehow gets any hint about their task, all of them will receive a violation. They may only be allowed to move when Big Brother sounds the signal. Meanwhile, Samantha, who is acting as a fairy godmother in the House, may be allowed to move and act as their lookout.	Alyssa, Benedix, Eian, Karen, KD, Samantha, Shanaia, and TJ	Failed
13	November 23 (Day 39)	Reward task	First Golden Ticket; For finishing their first PBB Arcade game, Kyle was tasked to give KD the golden ticket they have earned. The ticket will allow KD to see a recorded message from his dad.	Kyle	Passed
14	November 24 (Day 40)	Reward task	Second Golden Ticket; For finishing their second PBB Arcade game, the male housemates except Brenda were given the chance to give one of them the time for a friendly date with a female housemate. They unanimously decided to give the second golden ticket to KD, allowing him and Anji to have a carnival date in the arcade.	Benedix, Eian, Jordan, KD, Kyle and TJ	Passed
15	December 6 (Day 52)	Reward task	Real or Fake; Chosen by Kumu users through Kumunity Decides, Eian was tasked to deliver eight news from the outside world to the housemates by streaming from the task room. The other housemates must then guess if those news reports were real or fake. If the housemates were able to guess at least five correct news reports, Eian will earn a special reward (a news about the health condition of his father). The outcome of Real or Fake task: No. / Headlines (translated from Filipino) / Response / Outcome; 1 / Face-to-face classes have begun in the Philippines. / Real / Wrong; 2 / Sharon Cuneta is also included in FPJ's Ang Probinsyano. / Real / Correct; 3 / The first tourists have already flown to Mars. / Fake / Correct; 4 / Janella Salvador will portray as "Valentina," the villain in Darna. / Fake / Wrong; 5 / Queen Elizabeth II has passed the crown to Prince Charles. / Fake / Correct; 6 / Theaters are still closed today. / Fake / Correct; 7 / Bright Orange is the Color of the Year for 2022. / Real / Wrong; 8 / Wearing of face shield is not mandatory in Metro Manila. / Real / Correct	Eian	Passed
16	December 6 (Days 52)	Reward task	Wire Maze Task; With the exception of Eian, the housemates must finish a metal loop of electric wire maze. The metal loop must not touch any part of the electric maze; and if ever such loop touches it, such housemate will need to go back from the start. The first five housemates to finish this task will be able to earn a message from their loved ones. In addition, the housemates were given a chance to give one housemate who didn't win in the game, which they chose Madam Inutz to earn a message from her mother who is bedridden.	Benedix, Shanaia, Jordan, and Brenda	Passed
16	December 6 (Days 52)	Reward task		Alexa, Alyssa, Anji, KD, Madam Inutz, and Samantha	Failed
17	December 14 (Day 60)	Special task	Madam Inutz and Alyssa must roam around the swimming pool for ten times while using crutches before getting their food supply from the Kumunity Pantry, where the housemates got their answers correctly in their game of charades. Completion of this special task will give Madam Inutz and Alyssa the opportunity to give beneficiary Verniel Faustrilla with arm crutches and a sports wheelchair.	Madam Inutz and Alyssa	Passed

== Challenges ==
=== Head of Household ===
Challenge No.	Date given	Challenge title and description	Head of Household
1	October 23 (Day 8)	Battle for Immunity; While holding a large invitation card, each of the housemates must reach point B from point A by stepping onto a series of eight balance balls. If ever they fell from any of the balls, they will have to go back to point A and restart the challenge. The housemate with the fastest time wins the challenge. Padaluck recipient: Eian (7 balance balls to step on instead of 8)	Brenda
2	November 7 (Day 23)^{1}	School Trip; While wearing their school uniforms, each housemate must be able to memorize 6 items. They will only be allowed to start the challenge once the school bell rings. Once they will hear the bell, they will first have to gather all the books provided, place the books in a school bag, and carry the said bag while doing the challenge. Afterwards, they will then have to raise a flag in order to reveal 6 individual items; in case that they may forget the items or the correct order, they are allowed to raise the flag again. From a locker, they will then have to search for the said 6 items one by one and arrange them in the correct order. If they feel that they got the correct order, they may submit their answer by pressing the red button; a bell sound will be played if they got the correct answer. The housemate with fastest time to finish wins the challenge. Padaluck recipient: Eian (5 items required to memorize instead of 6)	TJ
3	November 14 (Day 30)	Pinoy Small Brother House Within 100 seconds and by only using a big pair of tongs, each of the housemates must stack tiny colored cylinders to a tiny pedestal placed in miniature model of the House's outdoor area. Each of the colored cylinder is equivalent to a certain point: 1 point for a blue cylinder, 2 points for a red cylinder, and 3 points for a yellow cylinder; only standing cylinders will be counted. The housemate(s) with the most number of points wins the challenge. Padaluck recipient: Eian (additional 20-second advantage from 100 seconds)	Madam Inutz, Samantha
4	November 27 (Day 43)^{2}	Perfect Punch Challenge; Each housemate must punch a hanging punching bag in order for it to move towards the HOH mark. They are given 5 attempts to punch the bag. The housemate with the nearest distance to the HOH mark wins the challenge. Padaluck recipient: KD (additional two attempts from 5)	Anji

=== Group challenges ===
Challenge No.
Date given
Challenge title and description
Winner
Loser(s)
1
November 14
(Day 30)
Pinoy Big Brother Games 2021
Alyssa, Benedix and Jordan were informed that the housemates will participate in the Pinoy Big Brother Games wherein the housemates, in groups of five, will compete for points in a series of games with the group earning the most points winning immunity for the next nomination round. The three were also assigned as leaders for their respective five person teams. To determine which team will the housemates be part of, except for the team captains, all of the housemates were tasked to do a series of physical challenge to complete: 100 jumping jacks, 50 squats, and 30 burpees. After finishing all the exercises, the housemate to finish first will then have to get their corresponding rank badge; the others will also have to follow suit according to their rank. The rank badge will determine their order of when they will have to choose their teams of choice. After the first ranking housemate had chosen his or her team, the next in rank will then follow.

Teams:

- Phenomenal Altos: Alyssa (captain), Alexa, Chie, KD and Kyle
- Bigateam: Benedix (captain), Brenda, Eian, Karen and TJ
- Jordan's Angels: Jordan (captain), Anji, Madam Inutz, Samantha and Shanaia

The games of Pinoy Big Brother Games 2021
Challenge No.	Date given	Challenge title and description	Points earned		
Challenge No.	Date given	Challenge title and description	Phenomenal Altos	Bigateam	Jordan's Angels
1	Nov. 15 (Day 31)	Flag Game; While in a boxing ring, each representative of the three teams per round will have to take the flags of the other team representatives while wearing a pair of boxing gloves. If any of the said representatives' flags are taken by the others, he or she will earn no point; if one can protect his or her flag from others, he or she will earn 1 point; and if one can take any of the other team representatives' flags, he or she will earn 2 points. All in all, this game will be played in 5 rounds. The team with the most points will win this challenge.	0	9	6
2	Nov. 16 (Day 32)	Land Swimming; Each representative must transfer the flag placed in point A by swimming using backstrokes onto a slippery floor to point B. They must also return to point A after transferring their respective flags. The first representative to finish the game will earn 2 points, the second with 1 point, and the last with no point. This game will also consists of 5 rounds and the team with the most points will win this challenge.	7	5	3
3	Nov. 18 (Day 34)	Bottle Weightlifting; The housemates have to lift a barbell-like equipment and balance 5 bottles placed on top of each side (all in all, there will be a total of 10 bottles). Using the snatch technique in weightlifting, they will have to lift the barbell up while keeping the bottles from falling down. The points that each representative will earn will depend on the number of bottles he or she can keep standing. This game will have 5 rounds and the team with the most points wins this challenge.	32	41	20
Total Points			39	55	29

Bigateam
Phenomenal Altos,
Jordan's Angels
2
November 29
(Day 45)
Tower Task
Each two groups of the divided House were given a task to create a tower made of blocks. The blocks will be taken from a platform placed at the center of pool. Since these blocks were not divided equally, each of the groups will have to take all the blocks that they can get using only panungkit or improvised poles that they will have to make. They will only have 20 minutes to get as many blocks as they could have.

At the end of the week, the group that will be able to make the highest standing block tower will win immunity, while the losing group will be the ones who will be nominated for the next nominations.

Teams:

- Yellow Team: Anji, Brenda, KD, Benedix, Madam Inutz, Samantha and Shanaia
- Blue Team: Alyssa, Alexa, Jordan, TJ, Karen and Eian

Tower Task challenges
Challenge No.	Date given	Challenge title and description	Yellow Team	Blue Team
1	Nov. 30 (Day 46)	Extreme Tic-Tac-Toe; For 5 rounds, the first group to be able to make a three side-by-side pamato or pucks each round (hence, forming a tic-tac-toe pattern) will earn a point. Each round will have separate obstacles or to wear something in order to make the challenge more difficult. For the first round, they will have to cross over several tires; for the second round, they will have to use office chairs; for the third round, thy will have to do duck walks while being inside a sack bag; for the fourth round, each team will be walking in a three-legged race (per puck, two players will play per team); and lastly for the fifth round, they will now be allowed to sprint. The winning team of each round will be able to get an additional 70 blocks for their tower task.	Winner for Rounds 2, 3 and 4 (gained 210 blocks)	Winner for Rounds 1 and 5 (gained 140 blocks)
2	Dec. 1 (Day 47)	Tug of War; Each team will have to pull each ends of a rope that has flag placed at the center of it. Each will have to pull the flag towards their group so that the flag will be able to get inside their area. Prior to challenge, each team will have to make a wager of blocks (between 50 and 150). If they lose, these wagered blocks will be taken by the winning team. Aside from the blocks taken from the other team, the winning team will also be able to get a ladder that could help them in building their tower. The first team to win three rounds, wins the challenge. Wagered blocks: Yellow Team: 150 blocks; Blue Team: 150 blocks	Lost (lost 150 blocks)	Won (gained 150 blocks)
Final Height			99 inches	111 inches

Blue Team
Yellow Team

Notes

Celebrities

1. Jordan was exempt from performing this challenge as he entered the house four days before the second nomination proceedings.
2. Kyle participated in this challenge before being evicted on the same night. As the result of this challenge was presented on Day 44, Kyle's name and final length were excluded from the leaderboard.

=== The Ten Million Diamonds Challenge ===
Challenge No.	Date given	Challenge title and description	Order of finish or rank				
Challenge No.	Date given	Challenge title and description	1st	2nd	3rd	4th	5th
1	December 26 (Day 72)	All of the housemates must rank themselves in who they think had given the most to least contribution to the House. The ranking must be agreed by all of them. The first to rank will earn one million diamonds; the second with seven hundred fifty thousand diamonds; the third with five hundred thousand diamonds; the fourth with two hundred fifty thousand diamonds; and the fifth with one hundred thousand diamonds.	Brenda	Alyssa	Samantha	Madam Inutz	Anji
2	December 28 (Day 74)	The Final 5 must stack 17 oval blocks with the faces of all 17 Celebrity housemates without them collapsing. But first, the Final 5 must get their 17th block (the block containing the face of the block's holder) by pouring in water in the water container. If the block floats above the line, they can get that block and start stacking. They can use anything with the exception of any item typically used in scooping water or any liquid. The first to complete the challenge will earn one million diamonds; the second with seven hundred fifty thousand diamonds; the third with five hundred thousand diamonds; the fourth with two hundred fifty thousand diamonds; and the fifth with one hundred thousand diamonds.	Anji	Alyssa	Samantha	Brenda	Madam Inutz
3	December 29 (Day 75)	The Final 5 have to balance 17 balls on a narrow beam while stepping on the platform. They will start from 5 balls, and will be added at any given point to reach 17 balls. When a ball is dropped from the beam or the Final 5 member falls from the platform, they will not continue with the challenge. The Final 5 member who successfully kept the balls intact and stayed on the platform wins the challenge. For this challenge, the last Final 5 member standing will receive one million diamonds, while the rest receives two hundred thousand diamonds each.	Brenda	Alyssa	Madam Inutz	Samantha	Anji
4	December 30 (Day 76)	The Big Celebrity Kumunity Final 5 Tell All; Each of the final five faced questions from the previously evicted housemates and guest moderator Ogie Diaz. After the interrogation, each member will vote for a housemate. Each vote is worth two hundred fifty thousand diamonds. Kyle asked Alyssa regarding her lack of a role in solving the problems in the house, Alexa also asked her if she deserved the points Alyssa gave to her during their nominations. Ogie then asked Alyssa her to name the two remaining housemates she see as the least deserving to stay in the house. Anji was asked by Albie on what good deed she made so that she can be considered as a role model to other people. She was then asked by Alexa on why she played with KD's feelings. Ogie asked her about her authenticity to KD since she nominated him twice, and also the last question. Samantha was asked by TJ if all housemates will return, who will she evict first. John asked her if she is a runner-up or winner. Benedix asked her if who are the housemates that made her irritated but kept it a secret. Ogie asked Sam on how come she will win if she placed herself in 3rd rank. Chie asked Madam Inutz about her reasons for nominating her in the second nominations, The question directed at Brenda was more about her relationship with Eian.	Alyssa (7 votes)	Anji (3 votes)	Samantha and Madam Inutz (1 vote each)		Brenda (0 votes)

== Nomination history ==
In each standard nomination round, every housemate is called to the confession room to nominate two of their housemates for eviction with the first nominee receiving 2 points and the other receiving 1 point. The housemates with the most nomination points (usually 3) will then face the public vote to determine the evictee for that round. However, Big Brother may automatically nominate a housemate for rule violations or a failure in a task. On the other hand, immunity may be awarded as a reward for accomplishing a task. Big Brother may forcibly evict a housemate for severe violations and a housemate may opt to voluntarily leave the house. In certain circumstances, the nomination process may be delayed as a result of a pending challenge or task.

For the purposes of uniformity with the other previous season articles, the launch night is marked as Day 1, not the day after it.

	#1	#2	#3	#4	#5	#6	#7	#8	#9	Top 2	Nominations Received
Eviction Day and Date	Day 22 Nov. 6	Day 29 Nov. 13	Day 36 Nov. 20	Day 43 Nov. 27	Day 51 Dec. 5	Day 57 Dec. 11	Day 64 Dec. 19	Day 71 Dec. 26	Day 77 Jan. 1	—	Nominations Received
Nomination Day and Date	Day 16; Oct. 31	Day 23; Nov. 7	Day 30; Nov. 14	Day 37; Nov. 21	Day 44; Nov. 28	Day 52; Dec. 6	Day 58; Dec. 12	Day 66; Dec. 21	Day 72; Dec. 27		Nominations Received
Alyssa	John; Brenda	KD; Brenda	Chie; Karen	Anji; KD	Karen; KD	No nominations	Alexa; Brenda	Brenda; Samantha	No nominations	Celebrity; Top 2	3 (5)
Anji	Karen; John	KD; Albie	Alexa; Benedix	Alexa; Kyle	Alexa; KD	No nominations	Brenda; Eian	KD; Alyssa	No nominations	Celebrity; Top 2	25 (2; +1)
Samantha	Chie; Kyle	Anji; Alexa	Benedix; TJ	Jordan; Kyle	TJ; Karen	No nominations	Alexa; Eian	Madam Inutz; Brenda	No nominations	Evicted (Day 77)	5 (3; +1)
Madam Inutz	KD; Karen	Albie; KD	Chie; Kyle	Anji; Kyle	Alexa; KD	No nominations	Alexa; Anji	Brenda; Samantha	No nominations	Evicted (Day 77)	1 (3; +1)
Brenda	John; Alexa	Albie; KD	Alexa; KD	Kyle; Jordan	Alexa; TJ	No nominations	KD; Alexa	Alyssa; Samantha	No nominations	Evicted (Day 77)	10 (5; +1)
KD	Karen; John	Albie; Karen	Brenda; Karen	Kyle; Jordan	Karen; Brenda	No nominations	Brenda; Eian	Anji; Alexa	Evicted (Day 71)		37 (2; +1)
Alexa	John; Shanaia	Albie; Anji	Anji; Brenda	Anji; Jordan	Benedix; Samantha	No nominations	Jordan; Brenda	Alyssa; Madam Inutz	Evicted (Day 71)		36 (1)
Eian	TJ; Anji	KD; Shanaia	KD; Shanaia	Anji; Jordan	TJ; Karen	No nominations	KD; Anji	Evicted (Day 64)			9
Jordan	Not in the House	Exempt	Kyle; Chie	Alexa; KD	Samantha; Alexa	No nominations	Alexa; Anji	Evicted (Day 64)			8
Shanaia	Chie; Alyssa	Albie; Alexa	Eian; Kyle	Kyle; Alexa	Karen; Benedix	No nominations	Evicted (Day 57)				7 (+1)
Benedix	Not in the House	Albie; Anji	KD; Anji	Kyle; Anji	TJ; Alexa	No nominations	Evicted (Day 57)				10 (+1)
Karen	KD; Anji	Albie; KD	Chie; Brenda	Kyle; Shanaia	Alyssa; Madam Inutz	Evicted (Day 51)					18
TJ	Anji; John	KD; Alexa	KD; Eian	Alexa; KD	Samantha; Karen	Evicted (Day 51)					10
Kyle	Shanaia; John	Benedix; Albie	Eian; KD	Anji; KD	Evicted (Day 43)						20
Chie	Alexa; John	Albie; Alexa	Benedix; Karen	Evicted (Day 36)							11
Albie	Exempt	Kyle; Eian	Evicted (Day 29)								19
John	KD; Alexa	Evicted (Day 22)									11
Notes	^{1}	^{2}	^{3}	^{4}	^{5}	^{5,} ^{6,} ^{7}	^{5,} ^{8,} ^{9,} ^{10}	^{5,} ^{11,} ^{12}	^{none}		
Head(s) of Household	Brenda	TJ	Madam Inutz; Samantha	None	Anji	None			Challenge Score + Open Voting		
Up for eviction	John; Karen; KD	Albie; Alexa; Anji; KD	Benedix; Chie; Eian; KD	Alexa; Anji; Kyle	Alexa; Karen; Samantha; TJ	Anji; Benedix; Brenda; KD; Madam Inutz; Samantha; Shanaia	Alexa; Anji; Brenda; Eian; Jordan; KD	Alexa; Anji; KD; Madam Inutz; Samantha	Challenge Score + Open Voting		
Saved from eviction	KD; 45.04% Karen; 18.44%	Alexa; 17.09% KD; 16.08% Anji; 8.46%	KD; 17.35% Benedix; 16.83% Eian; 12.12%	Anji; 30.03% Alexa; 27.98%	Alexa; 36.95% Samantha; 28.03%	Brenda; Power to Save Madam Inutz; 17.54% Anji; 16.50% KD; 15.57% Samantha; 14.32%	Anji; 19.28% KD; 18.22% Alexa; 17.60% Brenda; 15.51%	Anji; 19.18% Madam Inutz; 18.92% Samantha; 17.98%	Alyssa; 22.63% Anji; 13.60%		
Evicted	John; 0.30%	Albie; 6.48%	Chie; 11.16%	Kyle; 22.25%	Karen; 16.42% TJ -3.05%	Shanaia; 13.02% Benedix; 8.66%	Jordan; 4.53% Eian; 2.72%	Alexa; 17.03% KD; 16.99%	Samantha; 13.53% Madam Inutz; 13.03% Brenda; 2.84%		
References											

Legend
Housemate received immunity after becoming a Head of Household.
Housemate received immunity after winning or finishing a task or challenge; or was exempt from the nominations due to being a new entrant.
Housemate was automatically nominated as a result of a twist or a rule violation.
Housemate was up for eviction but was removed from the list of nominated housemates after being saved by another housemate or by oneself.
Green name Housemate received positive nomination points from another housemate.

Notes

1. Albie was exempt from the nominations for being a new entrant. He entered the House on Day 12, four days before the first nomination night.
2. Jordan was exempt from the nominations for being a new entrant. He entered the House on Day 19, four days before the second nomination night.
3. Madam Inutz and Samantha both became the Heads of Household for the week after they tied in the challenge.
4. The group consisting of Benedix, Brenda, Eian, Karen and TJ won immunity after earning the most points in the Pinoy Big Brother Games 2021.
5. This eviction is a double eviction wherein two nominees were evicted.
6. The nominations for the sixth eviction was determined via a challenge between Yellow Team (Anji, Brenda, KD, Benedix, Madam Inutz, Samantha and Shanaia) and the Blue Team (Alyssa, Alexa, Jordan, TJ, Karen and Eian) wherein the Blue Team won and was declared safe. As nominees from the prior nominations, Alexa, Karen, and TJ may only be safe for this round of nominations if they were to be saved in the fifth eviction night.
7. Brenda used the Power to Save he won on Day 9 on herself for this round of nominations, removing himself from the list of nominees for that week.
8. For this week, the housemates had a face to face nomination unlike the previous nomination rounds.
9. Madam Inutz used her Nomination Immunity Pass for this round, giving her immunity for this week.
10. This nomination week is similar to All In season's All In nominations, wherein all housemates who received votes were up for eviction.
11. This nomination round had a positive nomination unlike the previous nomination rounds.
12. Alyssa and Brenda both became safe from nomination after they tied the most positive nomination points.

== Kumunity beneficiaries ==
- Philippine Mental Health Association, Inc. — A special task was given to Albie to organize a Kumu livestream show where all Kumu diamonds collected will be given to this Kumunity. In addition, the proceeds from their Sa Linyang Kainan weekly task, which they successfully completed, were also given to this Kumunity in the amount of one hundred thousand pesos (₱100,000).
- Philippine Accessible Disability Services, Inc. (PADS) — A special task was given to Alyssa and Madam Inutz to walk using crutches, and get their daily food supply by roaming around the swimming pool ten times. Having completed the task, they provided Verniel Faustrilla, a disabled athlete and PADS member, with new arm crutches and sports wheelchair. In addition, after successfully completing the Makuha Ka Sa Tingin weekly task, the housemates gave the amount of one hundred thousand pesos (₱100,000) to this Kumunity.
- Victims of Typhoon Odette — With needed supplies provided by ABS-CBN Foundation, the housemates packed relief goods for distribution to the families affected by Typhoon Odette (internationally known as Rai). A special task was given to Alexa, Anji, Brenda, Eian, Jordan, and KD to organize a Kumu livestream show where all Kumu diamonds collected will be given to the victims and communities affected. In addition, after successfully completing the Andito Tayo Para Sa Isa't Isa weekly task, the housemates gave the amount of one hundred thousand pesos (₱100,000) to this Kumunity, but Big Brother has added more funds to the initial amount and increased to one million pesos (₱1,000,000) as an incentive for the housemates' sacrifices for that week.

== S-E voting system result ==
Eviction No.	Nominee	Votes			Result	Refs.
Eviction No.	Nominee	To-Save	To-Evict	Net Total	Result	Refs.
1	John	12.12%	-11.82%	0.30%	Evicted	
1	Karen	23.55%	-5.11%	18.44%	Saved	
1	KD	46.22%	-1.18%	45.04%	Saved	
2	Albie	20.45%	-13.97%	6.48%	Evicted	
2	Alexa	17.50%	-0.41%	17.09%	Saved	
2	Anji	19.77%	-11.31%	8.46%	Saved	
2	KD	16.34%	-0.26%	16.08%	Saved	
3	Benedix	23.05%	-6.22%	16.83%	Saved	
3	Chie	16.38%	-5.22%	11.16%	Evicted	
3	Eian	21.70%	-9.58%	12.12%	Saved	
3	KD	17.59%	-0.24%	17.35%	Saved	
4	Alexa	28.22%	-0.24%	27.98%	Saved	
4	Anji	33.39%	-3.36%	30.03%	Saved	
4	Kyle	28.52%	-6.27%	22.25%	Evicted	
5	Alexa	39.14%	-2.19%	36.95%	Saved	
5	Karen	18.11%	-1.69%	16.42%	Evicted	
5	Samantha	30.67%	-2.64%	28.03%	Saved	
5	TJ	1.25%	-4.30%	-3.05%	Evicted	
6	Anji	17.95%	-1.45%	16.50%	Saved	
6	Benedix	9.03%	-0.37%	8.66%	Evicted	
6	KD	16.47%	-0.90%	15.57%	Saved	
6	Madam Inutz	19.71%	-2.17%	17.54%	Saved	
6	Samantha	16.25%	-1.93%	14.32%	Saved	
6	Shanaia	13.40%	-0.38%	13.02%	Evicted	
7	Alexa	22.22%	-4.62%	17.60%	Saved	
7	Anji	19.43%	-0.15%	19.28%	Saved	
7	Brenda	20.66%	-5.15%	15.51%	Saved	
7	Eian	3.61%	-0.89%	2.72%	Evicted	
7	Jordan	4.72%	-0.19%	4.53%	Evicted	
7	KD	18.29%	-0.07%	18.22%	Saved	
8	Alexa	20.26%	-3.23%	17.03%	Evicted	
8	Anji	19.58%	-0.40%	19.18%	Saved	
8	KD	17.10%	-0.11%	16.99%	Evicted	
8	Madam Inutz	19.27%	-0.35%	18.92%	Saved	
8	Samantha	18.84%	-0.86%	17.98%	Saved	
9	Alyssa	22.69%	-0.06%	22.63%	Finalist	
9	Anji	19.21%	-5.61%	13.60%	Finalist	
9	Brenda	4.19%	-1.35%	2.84%	Evicted	
9	Madam Inutz	18.44%	-5.41%	13.03%	Evicted	
9	Samantha	18.29%	-4.76%	13.53%	Evicted	

== Reception ==
=== Praises ===
During this edition, the show opened a conversation, both on the show and online, about the mental health struggles of the celebrity housemates. With the help of the show's resident psychologist-psychiatrist Dr. Randy Dellosa, mental health conditions were being addressed on the show, including KD Estrada's anxiety, Albie Casiño's attention deficit hyperactivity disorder, Alexa Ilacad's body dysmorphia, and the housemates' reaction and response on dealing with people diagnosed with such conditions. As such conversations remain a taboo in Filipino society, the move has won praise and appreciation from netizens for normalizing mental health-related conversations.

=== Controversies and criticisms ===
==== Unli-Voting and alleged favoritism of Anji Salvacion ====
The second nomination week of the celebrity edition saw a tight battle between the set of nominees. Two days prior to the end of voting, the management decided to remove the Kumu voting limit of 10 votes per account per day in a twist called "Unli-Voting." The twist drew some flak amongst avid and loyal viewers, claiming that "it is unfair" as the results wouldn't reflect the choices of the voting audience as a small number of voters can drastically swing the results for or against a nominee in limited time. It was also seen as a sketchy move intended to save alleged management favorite Anji Salvacion, who was trailing Albie Casiño before unli-voting came into effect, and Salvacion was criticized by viewers for giving a harsh rebuke to fellow nominee KD Estrada, who was struggling with his mental health at the time, causing her to garner a lot of BBEs (votes to evict) prior to the unli-voting announcement.

By the time the voting closed, Salvacion overtook Casiño, who ended up being the second evictee. As a result, the hashtags #PBBUnfair and #PBBCancelUnliVotes trended on Twitter with the fans sending questions on executive producer and director Lauren Dyogi's Twitter, who then explained that they "initially planned it for the first nomination week but it didn't push through because of technical issues." After weeks of further criticism, especially after Estrada and fellow fan favorite Alexa Ilacad were both evicted on the same night, the twist was later cancelled for the Celebrity Batch's final eviction and, by extension, the rest of the season.

Eventually, Salvacion ended up as the season's Big Winner, which sparked criticism of vote-rigging in her favor due to the unexpected 22.21% gap between Salvacion and Isabel Laohoo, mainly from Estrada and Ilacad's supporters who dislike her due to her antagonism towards Estrada while they were inside the house, and also due to Laohoo's wealth being a factor in her getting landslide votes to save whenever she was up for eviction.

==== Inappropriate remarks ====
Brenda Mage received backlash from viewers after a clip of him giving inappropriate remarks went viral across social media platforms, which included inappropriate solicitation of sexual favors towards Eian Rances and offensive jokes. Mage apologized to Rances after being reminded by Big Brother in the confession room. Mage also received backlash for allegedly talking bad behind fellow housemate Alexa Ilacad due to both of their relationships with Rances, and the viewers were upset when a Kumu livestream clip showcased Mage talking harshly about Ilacad to his fellow housemate, Madam Inutz. Mage apologized to Ilacad after the conclusion of the Celebrity Edition. Mage eventually finished as the 5th Big Placer to a positive reception from the public, with many describing his second stint inside the house as his redemption arc.

==== Allegations of sexual misconduct ====
TJ Valderrama was subjected to controversy after he was spotted touching and looking at Shanaia Gomez in an allegedly sexual manner on several occasions by live feed viewers. This resulted in calls for his immediate removal from the house with the hashtag #ForceEvictTJ trending nationwide on November 20, 2021, alongside "Protect Shanaia Gomez." Gabriela Women's Party, a left-wing Filipino political party which advocates for the protection of women's rights, has also released a statement calling out the show regarding the issue. Moreover, the show and the housemates stated that there was nothing wrong happening, and that the viewers should be careful of what they accuse. Valderrama was eventually evicted on Day 51 while also being the sole housemate to receive a negative vote tally for the season.
