= Smart–Maynilad Net Spikers =

Philippine volleyball club

Smart-Maynilad Net Spikers
- Short name: Smart-Maynilad
- Nickname: Net Spikers
- Founded: 2013
- Dissolved: 2013
- Captain: Rubie De Leon (NU)
- League: Shakey's V-League
- 2013 SVL Open Conference: 2nd place

Uniforms
Home	Away

The Smart-Maynilad Net Spikers was a professional women's volleyball club playing in the Shakey's V-League. The team is owned by Smart Communications and Maynilad Water Services.

== Current roster ==
Smart-Maynilad Net Spikers
Number	Player	Position	Height	Birth date
1	(Philippines) Rubie De Leon (c)	Setter	1.69 m (5 ft 7 in)	July 26, 1980 (age 46)
2	(Philippines) Alyssa Valdez	Outside hitter	1.75 m (5 ft 9 in)	June 29, 1993 (age 33)
3	(Philippines) Suzanne Roces	Opposite hitter	1.78 m (5 ft 10 in)	July 17, 1985 (age 41)
5	(Philippines) Grethcel Soltones	Outside hitter	1.73 m (5 ft 8 in)	September 9, 1995 (age 31)
7	(Philippines) Maruja Banaticla	Opposite hitter	1.70 m (5 ft 7 in)	March 2, 1993 (age 33)
8	(Philippines) Maria Rosario Soriano	Middle blocker	1.73 m (5 ft 8 in)	October 14, 1985 (age 40)
9	(Philippines) Melissa Gohing	Libero	1.60 m (5 ft 3 in)	October 22, 1991 (age 34)
11	(Philippines) Nasella Nica Gulliman	Middle blocker	1.82 m (6 ft 0 in)	
12	(Philippines) Jamenea Ferrer	Setter	1.57 m (5 ft 2 in)	December 12, 1991 (age 34)
16	(Philippines) Dindin Santiago	Middle blocker	1.88 m (6 ft 2 in)	September 26, 1993 (age 33)
17	(Thailand) Wanida Kotruang	Outside hitter	1.70 m (5 ft 7 in)	June 21, 1990 (age 36)
18	(Thailand) Lithawat Kesinee	Middle blocker	1.78 m (5 ft 10 in)	

Coaching staff

- Head Coach:
  - Roger Gorayeb

== Honors ==
=== Team ===
Season	Conference	Title	Source
2013	Open	2nd place	

=== Individual ===
Season	Conference	Award	Name	Source
2013	Open	Best Digger	Melissa Gohing	
