= Melissa Gohing =

Filipino volleyball athlete (born 1991)

Personal information
- Full name: Melissa Gohing
- Nickname: Mel, The Ninja
- Nationality: Filipino
- Born: October 22, 1991 (age 35)
- Hometown: Bacolod, Negros Occidental, Philippines
- Height: 1.60 m (5 ft 3 in)
- Weight: 58 kg (128 lb)
- Education: De La Salle University

Volleyball information
- Position: Libero

Career
Years	Teams
2013	Smart-Maynilad Net Spikers
2014	Mane 'n Tail Lady Stallions
2015	Philips Gold Lady Slammers
2016–2017	Pocari Sweat Lady Warriors
2018–2019	Creamline Cool Smashers

Melissa "Mel" Gohing-Nacino (born October 22, 1991) is a Filipino volleyball athlete. She played for the Creamline Cool Smashers until 2019 in the Premier Volleyball League.

== Personal life ==
Born in Bacolod, Negros Occidental, to a family of Filipino, Chinese and Spanish ancestry. She's the third among five kids, has one brother and three sisters. Early in her childhood, she already exhibited signs of being a fashionista. Her mom said, when she was in preschool, she always wants to wear footwear that matches her dress (it must be color coordinated). She attended preschool in Tay Tung High School. She transferred to Hope Christian High School during her elementary years, where she joined the Chinese folk dance troupe and street dance group. She studied at De La Salle University for college.

On January 21, 2021, she married actor Rocco Nacino.

== Career ==
She found her calling in sports, and started training in volleyball since grade six. She continued playing for Hope Christian High School, under the watchful eye of Coach Jerry Yee, until she graduated. She played as a libero for DLSU Lady Spikers. In her five years in the UAAP, she won 4 UAAP championships under the guidance of Coach Ramil De Jesus and was hailed as UAAP Season 71 Rookie of the Year in both indoor and beach volleyball. She played for Mane 'n Tail Lady Stallions in 2014 and the name changes to Philips Gold Lady Slammers in 2015 where they bagged the bronze medal in All-Filipino and Grand Prix Conference. In 2016, her team transferred in the Premier Volleyball League as Pocari Sweat Lady Warriors and bagged three straight championships and a silver finish in the Premier Volleyball League 1st Season Open Conference.

== Clubs ==
- (Philippines) Smart-Maynilad Net Spikers (2013)
- (Philippines) Mane 'n Tail Lady Stallions / Philips Gold Lady Slammers / Pocari Sweat Lady Warriors (2014–2017)
- (Philippines) Creamline Cool Smashers (2018–2019)

== Awards ==
=== Individuals ===
- 2008 Dan Landry Invitational Volleyball League "Most Valuable Player"
- 2008 Shakey's Girls' Volleyball League - NCR Leg Division 1 "Best Receiver"
- UAAP Season 71 Seniors' Indoor Volleyball "Rookie of the Year"
- UAAP Season 71 Seniors' Beach Volleyball "Rookie of the Year"
- Shakey's V-League 10th Season Open Conference "Best Digger"
- Shakey's V-League 13th Season Open Conference "Best Libero"
- Premier Volleyball League 1st Season Reinforced Open Conference "Best Libero"
- Premier Volleyball League 1st Season Open Conference "Best Libero"

=== Collegiate ===
- UAAP Season 71 volleyball tournaments – Champions, with DLSU Lady Spikers
- UAAP Season 72 volleyball tournaments – Silver Medal, with DLSU Lady Spikers
- UAAP Season 73 volleyball tournaments – Champions, with DLSU Lady Spikers
- UAAP Season 74 volleyball tournaments – Champions, with DLSU Lady Spikers
- UAAP Season 75 volleyball tournaments – Champions, with DLSU Lady Spikers

=== Club ===
- 2013 Shakey's V-League League Open Conference – Silver medal, with Smart-Maynilad Net Spikers
- 2015 PSL Grand Prix Conference – Bronze medal, with Philips Gold Lady Slammers
- 2015 PSL All-Filipino Conference – Bronze medal, with Philips Gold Lady Slammers
- 2016 Shakey's V-League League Open Conference – Champions, with Pocari Sweat Lady Warriors
- 2016 Shakey's V-League League Reinforced Conference – Champions, with Pocari Sweat Lady Warriors
- 2017 Premier Volleyball League Reinforced Conference – Champions, with Pocari Sweat Lady Warriors
- 2017 Premier Volleyball League Open Conference – Silver medal, with Pocari Sweat Lady Warriors
- 2018 Premier Volleyball League Reinforced Conference – Champions, with Creamline Cool Smashers
- 2018 Premier Volleyball League Open Conference – Champions, with Creamline Cool Smashers
- 2019 Premier Volleyball League Reinforced Conference – Silver medal, with Creamline Cool Smashers
- 2019 Premier Volleyball League Open Conference – Champions, with Creamline Cool Smashers
