= Wanida Kotruang =

Thai volleyball player (born 1990)

Personal information
- Nickname: Jang
- Nationality: Thai
- Born: June 29, 1990 (age 36) Sakon Nakhon, Thailand
- Height: 1.70 m (5 ft 7 in)
- Weight: 61 kg (134 lb)
- Spike: 283 cm (111 in)
- Block: 272 cm (107 in)

Volleyball information
- Position: Outside hitter

National team
- Years: Team
- 2014: Thailand

Wanida Kotruang (Thai: วนิดา โคตรเรือง, born 29 June 1990 in Sakon Nakhon) is a Thai indoor volleyball player. She is a member of the Thailand women's national volleyball team.

== Clubs ==
- (Thailand) Nakhon Ratchasima (2009–2014)
- (Philippines) Smart-Maynilad Net Spikers (2013)
- (Philippines) Cagayan Valley Lady Rising Suns (2013)
- (Thailand) Bangkok Glass (2014–2018)

== Awards ==
=== Individual ===
- 2013 PSL Grand Prix "Best outside spiker"

=== Clubs ===
- 2009–10 Thailand League - Bronze medal, with Nakhon Ratchasima
- 2010–11 Thailand League - Bronze medal, with Nakhon Ratchasima
- 2012–13 Thailand League - Bronze medal, with Nakhon Ratchasima
- 2013 Shakey's V-League 10th Season Open Conference - Silver medal, with Smart-Maynilad Net Spikers
- 2013–2014 Thailand League - Champion, with Nakhon Ratchasima
- 2014 Thai-Denmark Super League - Runner-Up, with Nakhon Ratchasima
- 2014–2015 Thailand League - Champion, with Bangkok Glass
- 2015 Thai-Denmark Super League - Champion, with Bangkok Glass
- 2015 Asian Club Championship - Champion, with Bangkok Glass
- 2015–2016 Thailand League - Champion, with Bangkok Glass
- 2016 Thai-Denmark Super League - Champion, with Bangkok Glass
- 2016 Asian Club Championship - place, with Bangkok Glass
- 2016–17 Thailand League - Runner-up, with Bangkok Glass
- 2017 Thai-Denmark Super League - Runner-up, with Bangkok Glass
- 2017–18 Thailand League - Third, with Bangkok Glass
- 2018 Thai-Denmark Super League - Runner-up, with Bangkok Glass
