= UAAP Season 72 volleyball tournaments =

Volleyball tournaments

UAAP Season 72 Volleyball
- Host school: Far Eastern University
Men's Finals	G1	G2	Wins
UST Growling Tigers	3	3	2
FEU Tamaraws	0	0	0
- Duration: February 24–27, 2010
- Arena(s): Filoil Flying V Arena, San Juan
- Finals MVP: Henry Pecaña
- Winning coach: Emil Lontoc
- Semifinalists: Ateneo Blue Eagles; UP Fighting Maroons
- TV network(s): Studio 23
Women's Finals	1	2	Wins
De La Salle Lady Archers	1	1	0
UST Growling Tigresses	3	3	2
- Duration: February 24–27, 2010
- Arena(s): Filoil Flying V Arena, San Juan
- Finals MVP: Rhea Dimaculangan
- Winning coach: Cesael de los Santos
- Semifinalists: Ateneo Lady Eagles; Adamson Lady Falcons
- TV network(s): Studio 23

== Men's tournament ==
=== Elimination round ===
==== Team standings ====
Team	W	L	PCT	GB	Tie
UST Growling Tigers	13	1	.929	-	
FEU Tamaraws	11	3	.786	2	
Ateneo Blue Eagles	8	6	.571	5	
UP Fighting Maroons	7	7	.500	6	
De La Salle Green Archers	7	7	.500	6	
UE Red Warriors	5	9	.357	9	
NU Bulldogs	3	11	.214	10	
Adamson Soaring Falcons	2	12	.143	11	

- Qualified to the semifinals with the twice-to-beat advantage
- Qualified to the semifinals
- Qualified to fourth-seed playoff

==== Schedule ====
Win	Loss

School	Round 1							Round 2						
School	1	2	3	4	5	6	7	8	9	10	11	12	13	14
AdU	UE school colors	UST school colors	NU school colors	Ateneo school colors	La Salle school colors	UP school colors	FEU school colors	La Salle school colors	Ateneo school colors	UP school colors	FEU school colors	UE school colors	UST school colors	NU school colors
Ateneo	UP school colors	NU school colors	UST school colors	Adamson school colors	FEU school colors	UE school colors	La Salle school colors	NU school colors	Adamson school colors	FEU school colors	UST school colors	UE school colors	UP school colors	La Salle school colors
La Salle	UST school colors	UE school colors	UP school colors	NU school colors	Adamson school colors	FEU school colors	Ateneo school colors	Adamson school colors	UST school colors	NU school colors	UE school colors	UP school colors	FEU school colors	Ateneo school colors
FEU	NU school colors	UP school colors	UE school colors	UST school colors	Ateneo school colors	La Salle school colors	Adamson school colors	UE school colors	UP school colors	Ateneo school colors	Adamson school colors	La Salle school colors	NU school colors	UST school colors
NU	FEU school colors	Ateneo school colors	Adamson school colors	La Salle school colors	UP school colors	UST school colors	UE school colors	Ateneo school colors	UE school colors	La Salle school colors	UP school colors	UST school colors	FEU school colors	Adamson school colors
UE	Adamson school colors	La Salle school colors	FEU school colors	UP school colors	UST school colors	Ateneo school colors	NU school colors	FEU school colors	NU school colors	UST school colors	La Salle school colors	Ateneo school colors	Adamson school colors	UP school colors
UP	Ateneo school colors	FEU school colors	La Salle school colors	UE school colors	NU school colors	Adamson school colors	UST school colors	UST school colors	FEU school colors	Adamson school colors	NU school colors	La Salle school colors	Ateneo school colors	UE school colors
UST	La Salle school colors	Adamson school colors	Ateneo school colors	FEU school colors	UE school colors	NU school colors	UP school colors	UP school colors	La Salle school colors	UE school colors	Ateneo school colors	NU school colors	Adamson school colors	FEU school colors

=== Bracket ===
Fourth-seed playoff
UP	3
La Salle	0

Semifinals; Top seeds twice-to-beat
1	UST	3
4	UP	0
2	FEU	3
3	Ateneo	1

Finals; Best-of-three series
1	UST	3	3
2	FEU	0	0

=== Fourth–seed playoff ===
Date		Score		Set 1	Set 2	Set 3	Set 4	Set 5	Total
17 Feb	De La Salle Green Archers	0–3	UP Fighting Maroons	18–25	15–25	18–25	–	–	51–75

=== Semifinals ===
==== UST vs. UP ====
Date		Score		Set 1	Set 2	Set 3	Set 4	Set 5	Total
20 Feb	UST Growling Tigers	3–0	UP Fighting Maroons	25–10	25–19	25–21	–	–	75–50
UST advances to the Finals

==== FEU vs. Ateneo ====
Date		Score		Set 1	Set 2	Set 3	Set 4	Set 5	Total
20 Feb	FEU Tamaraws	3–1	Ateneo Blue Eagles	18-25	25–16	25–22	25–22	–	93-80
FEU advances to the Finals

=== Finals ===
Date		Score		Set 1	Set 2	Set 3	Set 4	Set 5	Total
24 Feb	UST Growling Tigers	3–0	FEU Tamaraws	25–20	25–22	25–22	–	–	75-64
27 Feb	UST Growling Tigers	3–0	FEU Tamaraws	25–17	25–17	25–21	–	–	75–55
UST wins series 2–0

=== Awardees ===
- Finals MVP: Henry James Pecaña (University of Santo Tomas)
- Most valuable player: Andre Joseph Pareja (Ateneo de Manila University)
- Rookie of the Year: Christopher Michael Antonio (De La Salle University)
- Best blocker: Lloyd Arden Belgado (University of the Philippines Diliman)
- Best digger: Amenolah Acot (University of the East)
- Best receiver: Richard Rosero (National University)
- Best scorer: Chris Macasaet (De La Salle University)
- Best server: Ray Karl Dimaculangan (University of Santo Tomas)
- Best setter: Gerald Magtoto (University of the Philippines Diliman)
- Best spiker: Andre Joseph Pareja (Ateneo de Manila University)

== Women's tournament ==
=== Elimination round ===
==== Team standings ====
Team	W	L	PCT	GB
De La Salle Lady Archers	13	1	.929	-
UST Growling Tigresses	12	2	.857	1
Ateneo Lady Eagles	10	4	.714	3
Adamson Lady Falcons	9	5	.643	4
FEU Lady Tamaraws	6	8	.429	7
UP Lady Maroons	4	10	.286	9
UE Lady Warriors	1	13	.071	12
NU Lady Bulldogs	1	13	.071	12

- Qualified to the semifinals with the twice-to-beat advantage
- Qualified to the semifinals

==== Schedule ====
Win	Loss

School	Round 1							Round 2						
School	1	2	3	4	5	6	7	8	9	10	11	12	13	14
AdU	FEU school colors	NU school colors	La Salle school colors	Ateneo school colors	UE school colors	UP school colors	UST school colors	La Salle school colors	UE school colors	UST school colors	NU school colors	UP school colors	FEU school colors	Ateneo school colors
Ateneo	UP school colors	La Salle school colors	NU school colors	Adamson school colors	UST school colors	FEU school colors	UE school colors	UST school colors	La Salle school colors	NU school colors	FEU school colors	UP school colors	UE school colors	Adamson school colors
La Salle	UST school colors	Ateneo school colors	Adamson school colors	UE school colors	UP school colors	NU school colors	FEU school colors	Adamson school colors	Ateneo school colors	FEU school colors	UP school colors	NU school colors	UE school colors	UST school colors
FEU	Adamson school colors	UE school colors	UST school colors	UP school colors	NU school colors	Ateneo school colors	La Salle school colors	UE school colors	NU school colors	La Salle school colors	Ateneo school colors	UST school colors	Adamson school colors	UP school colors
NU	UE school colors	Adamson school colors	Ateneo school colors	UST school colors	FEU school colors	La Salle school colors	UP school colors	UP school colors	FEU school colors	Ateneo school colors	Adamson school colors	UST school colors	La Salle school colors	UE school colors
UE	NU school colors	FEU school colors	UP school colors	La Salle school colors	Adamson school colors	UST school colors	Ateneo school colors	FEU school colors	Adamson school colors	UP school colors	UST school colors	Ateneo school colors	La Salle school colors	NU school colors
UP	Ateneo school colors	UST school colors	UE school colors	FEU school colors	La Salle school colors	Adamson school colors	NU school colors	NU school colors	UST school colors	UE school colors	La Salle school colors	Ateneo school colors	Adamson school colors	FEU school colors
UST	La Salle school colors	UP school colors	FEU school colors	NU school colors	Ateneo school colors	UE school colors	Adamson school colors	Ateneo school colors	UP school colors	Adamson school colors	UE school colors	NU school colors	FEU school colors	La Salle school colors

==== Results ====
Results to the right and top of the black cells are first round games, those to the left and below are second round games.

Team	AdU	ADMU	DLSU	FEU	NU	UE	UP	UST
Adamson		3–1	0–3	3–0	3–0	3–0	3–0	1–3
Ateneo	3–1		0–3	3–1	3–0	3–0	3–0	3–2
La Salle	3–1	3–1		3–0	3–0	3–0	3–0	3–2
FEU	1–3	2–3	0–3		3–1	3–1	3–1	0–3
NU	1–3	0–3	1–3	0–3		2–3	2–3	0–3
UE	0–3	0–3	0–3	0–3	0–3		1–3	0–3
UP	1–3	0–3	1–3	0–3	3–1	3–1		0–3
UST	3–0	3–1	3–2	3–0	3–0	3–0	3–1	

Win
Loss

=== Bracket ===
Semifinals (Nos. 1 & 2 have twice-to-beat advantage)
1	La Salle	3
4	Adamson	1
2	UST	3
3	Ateneo	0

Finals (Best-of-three series)
1	La Salle	1	1
2	UST	3	3

=== Semifinals ===
==== La Salle vs. Adamson ====
Date		Score		Set 1	Set 2	Set 3	Set 4	Set 5	Total
20 Feb	De La Salle Lady Archers	3–1	Adamson Lady Falcons	16–25	25–16	25–22	25–22	–	91–85
La Salle advances to the Finals

==== UST vs. Ateneo ====
Date		Score		Set 1	Set 2	Set 3	Set 4	Set 5	Total
20 Feb	UST Growling Tigresses	3–0	Ateneo Lady Eagles	25-11	25–23	25–20	–	–	75-54
UST advances to the Finals

=== Finals ===
Date		Score		Set 1	Set 2	Set 3	Set 4	Set 5	Total
24 Feb	De La Salle Lady Archers	1–3	UST Growling Tigresses	26–24	23–25	16–25	21–25	–	86–99
27 Feb	De La Salle Lady Archers	1–3	UST Growling Tigresses	18–25	14–25	25–16	15–25	–	72–91
UST wins series 2-0

=== Awardees ===
- Finals MVP: Rhea Dimaculangan (University of Santo Tomas)
- Most valuable player: Cherry May Vivas (Far Eastern University)
- Rookie of the Year: Joanne Siy (De La Salle University)
- Best blocker: Joanne Siy (De La Salle University)
- Best digger: Lizlee Ann Gata (Adamson University)
- Best receiver: Lizlee Ann Gata (Adamson University)
- Best scorer: Cherry May Vivas (Far Eastern University)
- Best server: Rhea Dimaculangan (University of Santo Tomas)
- Best setter: Jamenea Ferrer (Ateneo de Manila University)
- Best spiker: Ma. Paulina Soriano (Adamson University)

Preceded by Season 71 (2008–09)	UAAP volleyball tournaments Season 72 (2009–10)	Succeeded by Season 73 (2010–11)
