= Jem Ferrer =

Filipino volleyball player

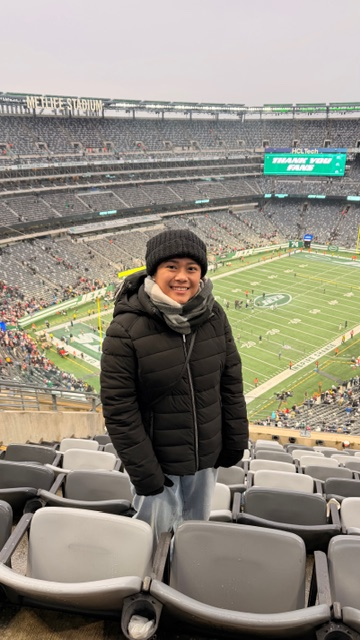
- Ferrer in 2025

Personal information
- Nationality: Filipino
- Born: December 12, 1991 (age 34); Manila, Philippines
- Height: 5 ft 2 in (157 cm)
- Weight: 140 lb (64 kg)
- Education: Ateneo

Volleyball information
- Position: Setter

Career
Years	Teams
2013	Smart-Maynilad Net Spikers
2014–2015	PLDT
2016	BaliPure Purest Water Defenders
2017–2021	Perlas Spikers
2021–2026	Choco Mucho Flying Titans

Jamenea "Jem" Ferrer is a Filipino professional volleyball player who last played as a setter for the Choco Mucho Flying Titans of the Premier Volleyball League (PVL).. She was a 3-time UAAP best setter awardee while playing for the Ateneo university Lady Eagles volleyball team. She was a member of Fab 5 together with Dzi Gervacio, Fille Cayetano, Gretchen Ho and A Nacachi.

== Early life ==
Jamenea Ferrer was born on December 12, 1991, in Manila, Philippines.

== Career ==
=== Collegiate ===
Ferrer won the UAAP Best Setter awards three times when she won the award in the 2009-2010 Season 72, 2010-2011 Season 73 and the 2012-2013 Season 75. She was the 2011 Shakey's V-League Season 8 1st Conference Finals Most Valuable Player, after guiding her team to the league championship.

=== Club ===
==== Smart–Maynilad ====
Ferrer played for the Smart–Maynilad Net Spikers in the Shakey's V-League. The team finished second place in the 2013 Open Conference.

==== PLDT ====
Ferrer later joined the Philippine Super Liga, where she was the fifth overall draft pick for the PLDT Home TVolution Power Attackers. She played for the Shakey's V-League sister team - the PLDT Home Telpad Turbo Boosters.

==== BaliPure ====
The BaliPure Purest Water Defenders took in Ferrer from PLDT for the 2016 Open Conference.

==== Perlas Spikers ====
Ferrer was part of the Perlas Spikers of the Premier Volleyball League (PVL) from 2017 to 2021. She has served as the team's captain. Her best finish with the team was third place at the 2019 Open Conference

==== Choco Mucho ====
In November 2021, Ferrer joined the Choco Mucho Flying Titans. She helped the team finish second in the 2023 PVL Second All-Filipino Conference and 2024 All-Filipino Conference. The team also won a bronze medal in the 2023 VTV International Women's Volleyball Cup in Vietnam. She left Choco Mucho in May 2026.

== Clubs ==
- (Philippines) Smart-Maynilad Net Spikers (2013)
- (Philippines) PLDT (2014–2015)
- (Philippines) BaliPure Purest Water Defenders (2016)
- (Philippines) Perlas Spikers (2017–2021)
- (Philippines) Choco Mucho Flying Titans (2021–2026)

== Awards ==
=== Individuals ===
- 2009-2010 UAAP Season 72 "Best Setter"
- 2010-2011 UAAP Season 73 "Best Setter"
- 2011 Shakey's V-League Season 8 Open Conference "Best Setter"
- 2011 Shakey's V-League Season 8 1st Conference "Finals Most Valuable Player"
- 2011 Shakey's V-League Southeast Asian Club Invitational "Best Setter"
- 2012-2013 UAAP Season 75 "Best Setter"
- 2012 Shakey's V-League Season 9 1st Conference "Best Setter"

=== Collegiate ===
- 2010 UAAP Season 72 volleyball tournaments - Bronze medal, with Ateneo De Manila University Lady Eagles
- 2012 UAAP Season 74 volleyball tournaments - Silver medal, with Ateneo De Manila University Lady Eagles
- 2013 UAAP Season 75 volleyball tournaments - Silver medal, with Ateneo De Manila University Lady Eagles

=== Club ===
- 2018 Premier Volleyball League Reinforced Conference – Bronze medal, with BanKo Perlas Spikers
- 2018 Premier Volleyball League Open Conference – Bronze medal, with the BanKo Perlas Spikers
- 2018 Vietnam Vinh Long Television Cup – Bronze medal, with the BanKo Perlas Spikers
- 2019 Premier Volleyball League Open Conference – Bronze medal, with the BanKo Perlas Spikers
- 2023 VTV International Women's Volleyball Cup – Bronze medal, with Choco Mucho Flying Titans
- 2023 Premier Volleyball League Second All-Filipino Conference – 1st Runner-Up, with Choco Mucho Flying Titans
- 2024 Premier Volleyball League All-Filipino Conference – 1st Runner-Up, with Choco Mucho Flying Titans
