= List of Shakey's V-League seasons and conferences =

Each year the Premier Volleyball League (formerly Shakey's V-League) organises several women's volleyball competitions in the Philippines.

== Types of conference ==
=== Active conferences ===
- SVL Open Conference - PLDT Home Telpad Turbo Boosters
- SVL Collegiate Conference - NU Lady Bulldogs
- SVL Reinforced Conference - PLDT Home Ultera Ultra Fast Hitters

=== Inactive conferences ===
- SVL 1st Conference - FEU Lady Tamaraws (SVL 11th Season)
- SVL 2nd Conference - Adamson Lady Falcons (SVL 7th Season)

=== Special conferences ===
- SEA Club Invitational - Vietsovpetro (SVL season 8)
- SVL All Star - Smart All Stars (SVL season 10)

== List of conferences ==
=== 2000s ===
- 2004 Shakey's V-League Season
  - Season 1, 1st Conference
  - Season 1, 2nd Conference
- 2005 Shakey's V-League Season
  - Season 2, 1st Conference
  - Season 2, 2nd Conference
- 2006 Shakey's V-League Season
- 2007 Shakey's V-League Season
  - Season 4, 1st Conference
  - Season 4, 2nd Conference
- 2008 Shakey's V-League Season
  - Season 5, 1st Conference
  - Season 5, 2nd Conference
- 2009 Shakey's V-League Season
  - Season 6, 1st Conference
  - Season 6, 2nd Conference

=== 2010s ===
- 2010 Shakey's V-League Season
  - Season 7, 1st Conference
  - Season 7, 2nd Conference
- 2011 Shakey's V-League Season
  - Season 8, 1st Conference
  - Season 8, Open Conference
  - Season 8, Invitational Cup
- 2012 Shakey's V-League Season
  - Season 9, 1st Conference
  - Season 9, Open Conference
- 2013 Shakey's V-League Season
  - Season 10, 1st Conference
  - Season 10, Open Conference
- 2014 Shakey's V-League Season
  - Season 11, 1st Conference
  - Season 11, Open Conference
  - Season 11, Reinforced Open Conference
- 2015 Shakey's V-League Season
  - Season 12, Open Conference
  - Season 12, Collegiate Conference
  - Season 12, Reinforced Open Conference
- 2016 Shakey's V-League Season
  - Season 13, Open Conference
  - Season 13, Collegiate Conference
  - Season 13, Reinforced Open Conference
