= San Sebastian Lady Stags volleyball =

Philippine volleyball team

San Sebastian Lady Stags
- Nickname: Lady Stags
- Location: C. M. Recto Ave., Manila, Philippines
- Head coach: Roger Gorayeb
- Captain: Kamille Josephine Amaka Tan

Main league
- League: NCAA
- Season 98 (2023): 8th

Other league/s
- League: V-League

Championships
- NCAA: 23; SVL:1

The San Sebastian Lady Stags is the women's collegiate volleyball teams of San Sebastian College-Recoletos. They compete in the National Collegiate Athletic Association (NCAA).

== History ==
San Sebastian Lady Stags joined NCAA in 1969. They have the longest champion streak in NCAA history with 10 from 1987 to 1997. They also have the most championships overall with 23. Their last championship was in 2011.

The San Sebastian Lady Stags also joined Shakey's Super League and V-League in 2022.

== Roster ==
=== NCAA Season 98 ===
San Sebastian Lady Stags
No.	Name	Position
3	BERMILLO, Jewelle	L
	BORJA, Clarence Claire	
	CARREON, Jamille Veronica	
2	DIONISIO, Kristine Joy	OH
12	LUMIBAO, Jassy Lei	MB
4	MARASIGAN, Christina	OP
	REQUIERME, Shane	
1	SANTOS, Katherine	OH
9	SISON, Alexia Vea (c)	S
	STA. MARIA, Hayvenae	
10	TAN, Kamille Josephine Amaka	MB
	Roger Gorayeb	HC

== Team honors ==
=== NCAA ===
San Sebastian Lady Stags (partial awards)
Year	Season	Title	Ref
1982–1983	59	Champions	
1983–1984	60	Champions	
1984–1985	61	Champions	
1986–1987	63	Champions	
1987–1988	64	Champions	
1988–1989	65	Champions	
1990–1991	66	Champions	
1991–1992	67	Champions	
1992–1993	68	Champions	
1993–1994	69	Champions	
1994–1995	70	Champions	
1995–1996	71	Champions	
1996–1997	72	Champions	
1999–2000	75	Champions	
2000–2001	76	Champions	
2001–2002	77	Champions	
2002–2003	78	Champions	
2005–2006	81	Champions	
2006–2007	82	Champions	
2007–2008	83	Champions	
2008–2009	84	Champions	
2009–2010	85	Champions	
2010–2011	86	Champions	
2011–2012	87	3rd place	
2012–2013	88	Runner-up	
2014–2015	90	Runner-up	
2015–2016	91	Runner-up	
2016–2017	92	Runner-up	

=== SSL ===
San Sebastian Lady Stags
Year	Season	Title	Ref
2022	Pre-Season	15th place	
2023	Pre-Season	12th place	
2024	Pre-Season	16th place	
2025	Pre-Season	11th place	

=== SVL/PVL/V-League ===
San Sebastian Lady Stags
Year	Conference	Title	Ref
2004	1st	4th place	
2004	2nd	7th place	
2005	1st	3rd place	
2006	1st	Runner-up	
2007	1st	Runner-up	
2007	2nd	Runner-up	
2008	1st	3rd place	
2008	2nd	Champions	
2009	1st	Runner-up	
2009	2nd	4th place	
2010	1st	Runner-up	
2010	2nd	Runner-up	
2011	1st	9th place	
2011	Open	Runner-up	
2012	1st	3rd place	
2012	Open	Champions	
2013	1st	8th place	
2013	Open	(did not join)	
2014	1st	10th place	
2014	Open	(did not join)	
2015	Collegiate	10th place	
2016	Collegiate	5th place	
2017	Collegiate	8th place	
2018	Collegiate	8th place	
2019	Collegiate	11th place	
2022	Collegiate	7th place	
2023	Collegiate	8th place	

=== Individual ===
==== NCAA ====
San Sebastian Lady Stags (partial awards)
Year	Season	Award	Player	Ref
2007	82	Most Valuable Player	Joy Pulido	
2009	84	Most Valuable Player	Laurence Ann Latigay	
2010	85	Most Valuable Player	Analyn Joy Benito	
2010	85	Best Blocker	Melissa Mirasol	
2010	85	Best Receiver	Margarita Pepito	
2012	87	Best Scorer	Analyn Joy Benito	
2012	87	Best Blocker	Dafna Robinos	
2012	87	Best Digger	Mae Denise Crisostomo	
2013	88	Best Scorer	Grethcel Soltones	
2013	88	Best Receiver	Mae Denise Crisostomo	
2015	90	Most Valuable Player (Season)	Grethcel Soltones	
2015	90	Best Scorer	Grethcel Soltones	
2015	90	Best Receiver	Alyssa Eroa	
2016	91	Most Valuable Player (Season)	Grethcel Soltones	
2016	91	Best Scorer	Grethcel Soltones	
2016	91	Best Digger	Alyssa Eroa	
2017	92	Most Valuable Player (Season)	Grethcel Soltones	
2017	92	1st Best Outside Hitter	Grethcel Soltones	
2017	92	Best Setter	Vira Guillerma	
2017	92	Best Libero	Alyssa Eroa	
2018	93	2nd Best Middle Blocker	Joyce Sta. Rita	
2018	93	Best Setter	Vira Guillerma	
2018	93	Best Libero	Alyssa Eroa	
2022	97	Best Opposite Hitter	Reyann Cañete	

==== SVL ====
San Sebastian Lady Stags (partial awards)
Year	Season	Award	Player	Ref
2006	1st	Best Digger	Margarita Pepito	
2007	1st	Best Digger	Margarita Pepito	
2007	2nd	Best Receiver	Margarita Pepito	
2007	2nd	Best Setter	Charisse Ancheta	
2008	1st	Best Receiver	Margarita Pepito	

== Season-by-season record ==
Records starting NCAA Season 84

Champion	Runner-up	Third place

Season	Field	Eliminations					Playoffs			Head coach	Ref.
Season	Field	Finish	GP	W	L	PCT	Round	Opponent	Result	Head coach	Ref.
2009	7	1st					Finals	Benilde Lady Blazers	W	Roger Gorayeb	
2010	10	3rd					Finals	Benilde Lady Blazers	W	Roger Gorayeb	
2011	9	1st					Finals	Letran Lady Knights	W	Roger Gorayeb	
2012	10	4th					Final Four	EAC Lady Generals	W	Roger Gorayeb	
2013	10	3rd					Finals	Perpetual Lady Altas	L	Roger Gorayeb	
2014	10	1st					Final Four	Benilde Lady Blazers	L	Roger Gorayeb	
2015	10	2nd					Finals	Arellano Lady Chiefs	L	Roger Gorayeb	
2016	10	1st	9	9	0	1.319	Finals	Benilde Lady Blazers	L	Roger Gorayeb	
2017	10	1st	9	9	0	1.247	Finals	Arellano Lady Chiefs	L	Roger Gorayeb	
2018	10	5th	9	5	4	1.500	Did not qualify			Roger Gorayeb	
2019	10	7th	9	4	5	.722	Did not qualify			Roger Gorayeb	
2020	Tournament cancelled									Roger Gorayeb	
2021	Tournament cancelled									Roger Gorayeb	
2022	10	3rd	10	6	3	1.467	Final Four	JRU Lady Bombers	L	Roger Gorayeb	
2023	10	7th	9	4	5	.833	Did not qualify			Roger Gorayeb	
2024	10	8th	9	2	7	.609	Did not qualify			Roger Gorayeb	
2025	10	7th	18	8	10	.784	Did not qualify			Roger Gorayeb	

== Former players ==
- Alyssa Eroa (L)
- Grethcel Soltones (OH)

Legend
S	Setter
L	Libero
MB	Middle Blocker
OH	Outside Hitter
OP	Opposite Hitter

== See also ==
- San Sebastian College-Recoletos
- San Sebastian Stags basketball
- San Sebastian Stags
