= SVL 1st Conference =

1st Conference was the tournament of Shakey's V-League (SVL) from 2004-2014.

== List of 1st Conference Champions ==
=== Per season ===
Won three or more consecutive tournaments
Won two consecutive tournaments

Season	Champion	Runner-up	Series	Details
Season 1	UST	La Salle	3–1; 3–1	SVL 1st Season
Season 2	La Salle	UST	3–2; 3–?	SVL 2nd Season
Season 3	La Salle	San Sebastian	3–0; 3–1	SVL 3rd Season
Season 4	UST	San Sebastian	3–0; 3–1	SVL 4th Season
Season 5	Adamson	Ateneo	3–1; 3–0	SVL 5th Season
Season 6	UST	San Sebastian	0–3; 3–0; 3–0	SVL 6th Season
Season 7	UST	San Sebastian	3-1; 2-3; 3–1	SVL 7th Season
Season 8	Ateneo	Adamson	3–1; 3–2	SVL 8th Season
Season 9	Ateneo	UST	1–3; 3–1; 3–2	SVL 9th Season
Season 10	NU	Ateneo	0–3; 3–0; 3–1	SVL 10th Season
Season 11	FEU	NU	3–0; 3–0	SVL 11th Season

=== Per Team ===
Total	Team	Most Recent Championship
4	UST	SVL 7th Season
2	La Salle	SVL 3rd Season
2	Ateneo	SVL 9th Season
1	Adamson	SVL 5th Season
1	NU	SVL 10th Season
1	FEU	SVL 11th Season
