= SVL 2nd Conference =

2nd Conference was the tournament of Shakey's V-League (SVL) from 2005 and 2007-2010.

== List of 2nd Conference Champions ==
=== Per season ===
Won three or more consecutive tournaments
Won two consecutive tournaments

Season	Champion	Runner-up	Series	Details
Season 1	No Tournament			
Season 2	La Salle	UST	3–1; 3–1	SVL 2nd Season
Season 3	No Tournament			
Season 4	UST	San Sebastian	2–3; 3–0; 3–2	SVL 4th Season
Season 5	San Sebastian	UST	3–0; 3–1	SVL 5th Season
Season 6	UST	Adamson	3–1; 3–1	SVL 6th Season
Season 7	Adamson	San Sebastian	3-2; 1-3; 3–0	SVL 7th Season

=== Per Team ===
Total	Team	Most Recent Championship
2	UST	SVL 6th Season
1	La Salle	SVL 2nd Season
1	San Sebastian	SVL 5th Season
1	Adamson	SVL 7th Season
