= Ramil de Jesus =

Filipino volleyball coach

Personal information
- Nationality: Filipino
- Education: Far Eastern University

Coaching information
- Current team: DLSU Lady Spikers
- Previous teams coached
- Years: Teams
- 1997–present 2005 2014 2014 2015 2015 2016–2021: DLSU Lady Spikers; Philippines (women); Generika-Ayala Lifesavers; AirAsia Flying Spikers; Meralco Power Spikers; Shopinas.com Lady Clickers; F2 Logistics Cargo Movers

Ramil H. de Jesus is a Filipino volleyball coach who is the head coach of the De La Salle University women's volleyball team since UAAP Season 62.

== Education ==
De Jesus initially pursued an architecture degree before shifting to business management. He graduated from the Far Eastern University in 1993.

== Playing career ==
De Jesus was a player himself, playing as an opposite hitter with the FEU Tamaraws.

== Coaching career ==
=== Collegiate ===
De Jesus has been a long-time coach of the De La Salle Lady Spikers women's volleyball team in the University Athletic Association of the Philippines (UAAP). He first coached DLSU for the Season 60 in 1997. He credits his coaching style to his mentors Emil Lontoc and Kid Santos.

From Season 62 in 1999 to Season 88 in 2026, De Jesus has guided the team in 26 seasons and led the team to 24 podium finishes. DLSU won 13 championships, had nine runner-up finishes, and two bronze medals with him. In Season 69, the whole DLSU sports program was imposed a ban following an eligibility controversy with the basketball team while in Season 70, the DLSU Lady Spikers forfeited games where its unenrolled star player played in which led them to miss the semifinals.

The DLSU Lady Spikers has competed in the Shakey's V-League under de Jesus and won three titles. The team last competed in the 2nd Conference of the 2008 season finishing third. The team stop competing in 2009, after they withdrew due to injuries. De La Salle was allegedly banned for leaving on short notice. This was denied by Sports Vision Ricky Palou in 2015 who insists the Lady Spikers were invited to take part for the past four years.

=== Club ===
==== Early years in the PSL ====
Ramil de Jesus has coached various clubs in the Philippine Super Liga (PSL) such as the Generika–Ayala Lifesavers, the AirAsia Flying Spikers, the Meralco Power Spikers and the Shopinas.com Lady Clickers.

==== F2 Logistics Cargo Moves ====
When the F2 Logistics Cargo Movers was formed in 2016 for the PSL, De Jesus was tap as its head coach. He won his first PSL title in the 2016 All Filipino. He skipped the 2018 PSL Grand Prix with Arnold Laniog temporarily taking over. While he has always been concurrently the head coach of F2 Logistics and the DLSU, 2019 was noted to be a busy year with the UAAP Season 81 volleyball tournament and the 2019 PSL Grand Prix occurring simultaneously. The league was disrupted by the COVID-19 pandemic with De Jesus garnering five PSL titles for the F2 Logistics.

F2 Logistics returned to competition in the 2021 PNVF Champions League for Women. They won the title with de Jesus as the coach.

De Jesus did not serve as head coach the F2 Logistics after they entered the Premier Volleyball League in 2022. However, de Jesus did appear as part of F2 Logistics' coaching staff during the team's bronze medal match in the 2023 All-Filipino Conference.

=== National team ===
De Jesus led the Philippines women's national volleyball team under the Philippine Volleyball Federation to a bronze medal finish in the 2005 SEA Games.

De Jesus was appointed again to be head coach of the Philippine national team, now under the Larong Volleyball sa Pilipinas, ahead of the 2018 Asian Games in April 2018. However de Jesus resigned in June due to scheduling issues.

== Hall of Fame ==
- DLSAA Sports Hall of Fame (2017)
- FEU Sports Hall of Fame (2023)
