= List of Premier Volleyball League conferences =

The Premier Volleyball League (PVL) has three active tournaments, known as conferences, each one differs depending on the format, player eligibility, and the overall structure of the conference.

== Types of conferences ==
=== Active tournaments ===
==== All-Filipino Conference ====
The All-Filipino Conference was first held in 2017. In this conference, only professional players with Filipino citizenship can compete. Known as the Open Conference from 2017 to 2022, it was originally catered to a hybrid of corporate-backed amateurs and collegiate squads when the league had not yet garnered its professional status.

==== Reinforced Conference ====
The Reinforced Conference was first held in 2017. It is an import-laden conference where teams can hire foreign reinforcement(s).

==== Invitational Conference ====
The Invitational Conference was first held in 2022. In this conference, foreign-based guest teams are invited to play in a short tournament against the local teams.

=== Defunct tournaments ===
==== Collegiate Conference ====
The Collegiate Conference was held from 2017 to 2019. This conference featured collegiate teams from various associations. Due to the PVL's professionalization, this conference can no longer be held and is succeeded by the revival of the V-League. It was held three times during its lifetime.

=== Other tournaments ===
==== PVL on Tour ====
The PVL on Tour was first held as a tournament in 2025. Named after the out-of-town series of the same name, this tournament puts greater emphasis on games held outside of Metro Manila, particular during the preliminary round.

==== Reinforced Invitational Conference ====
The Reinforced Invitational Conference was the planned merger of both the Reinforced and Invitational conferences. Originally planned for the 2024 season, the merged conference would have combined the foreign guest players from the Reinforced Conference and the guest teams from the Invitational Conference. The proposed conference went unused as the two conferences were still ran individually that season.

== Number of conferences ==
A traditional PVL season is composed of three conferences. Each conference takes place once per season with the order in which they are played varying each season. There are a few exceptions to this, however.

=== Exceptions ===
Due to the COVID-19 pandemic and its impact on Philippine sports at the time, the PVL was only going to host two conferences for the 2021 season, the Open and Reinforced conferences, the latter of which was cancelled due to the continuing effects of the pandemic and national team preparations.

The 2023 season featured a second All-Filipino Conference which replaced the intended Reinforced Conference due to sanctions imposed by the Philippine National Volleyball Federation (PNVF) for violating FIVB regulations. This sanction temporarily barred teams from getting foreign players as the federation was forbidden from issuing international transfer certificates.

The 2024–25 season had two All-Filipino Conferences, resulting from the league shifting its calendar from January–December to June–May. The second iteration, the 2024–25 All-Filipino Conference served as the transition to the new calendar.

The 2025–26 season featured the PVL on Tour as an additional preseason tournament to accommodate the Philippines' hosting of the 2025 FIVB Men's Volleyball World Championship.

== List of conferences ==
=== 2010s ===
- 2017 – Reinforced, Open, Collegiate
- 2018 – Reinforced, Collegiate, Open
- 2019 – Reinforced, Open, Collegiate

=== 2020s ===
- 2021 – Open
- 2022 – Open, Invitational, Reinforced
- 2023 – First All-Filipino, Invitational, Second All-Filipino
- 2024–25 – 2024 All-Filipino, Reinforced, Invitational, 2024–25 All-Filipino
- 2025–26 – Invitational, Reinforced, All-Filipino
- 2026–27 – Invitational

== See also ==
- List of Shakey's V-League seasons and conferences
