= 2010 Shakey's V-League season =

2010 SVL season
- League: Shakey's V-League
- Sport: Volleyball
- TV partner: NBN-4

1st Conference
- Season champions: UST Growling Tigresses
- Runners-up: San Sebastian Lady Stags
- Season MVP: Sue Roces

2nd Conference
- Season champions: Adamson Lady Falcons
- Runners-up: San Sebastian Lady Stags
- Season MVP: Sue Roces

Seasons
- ← 2009, 6th 8th, 2011 →

The 2010 Shakey's V-League (SVL) season was the seventh season of the Shakey's V-League. There were two indoor conferences for this season.

== 1st Conference ==
The Shakey's V-League 7th Season 1st Conference was the eleventh conference of Shakey's V-League, a collegiate women's volleyball league in the Philippines founded in 2004. The conference started April 11, 2010.

Participating teams

Pool A

Abbr.	Team
FEU	Far Eastern University Lady Tamaraws
SSC	San Sebastian College–Recoletos Lady Stags
SWU	Southwestern University Lady Cobras
USL	University of St. La Salle Lady Stingers
UST	University of Santo Tomas Tigresses

Pool B

Abbr.	Team
ADM	Ateneo de Manila University Lady Eagles
ADU	Adamson University Lady Falcons
CSB	College of St. Benilde Lady Blazers
LPU	Lyceum of the Philippines University Lady Pirates
USJ	University of San Jose–Recoletos Lady Jaguars

=== Preliminary round ===
Pool A

Team	W	L	PCT	GB	SW	SL	Avg
San Sebastian Lady Stags	4	0	1.000	--	12	1	.923
UST Growling Tigresses	3	1	.750	1	9	4	.692
USLS Lady Stingers	2	2	.500	2	8	7	.533
SWU Lady Cobras	1	3	.250	3	4	9	.308
FEU Lady Tamaraws	0	4	.000	4	0	12	.0

Qualified to the quarterfinals

Pool B

Team	W	L	PCT	GB	SW	SL	Avg
Adamson Lady Falcons	3	1	.750	--	10	6	.625
Ateneo Lady Eagles	3	1	.750	1	11	3	.786
Lyceum Lady Pirates	3	1	.750	2	9	5	.643
Benilde Lady Blazers	1	3	.250	3	5	9	.357
USJ–R Lady Jaguars	0	4	.000	4	0	12	.0

Qualified to the quarterfinals

=== Quarterfinals ===
Pool C

Team	W	L	PCT	GB	SW	SL	Avg
San Sebastian Lady Stags	2	1	.667	--	8	3	.727
Lyceum Lady Pirates	2	1	.667	1	6	6	.500
Adamson Lady Falcons	1	2	.333	2	4	6	.400
USLS Lady Stingers	1	2	.333	3	3	9	.250

Qualified to the semifinals

Pool D

Team	W	L	PCT	GB	SW	SL	Avg
UST Growling Tigresses	3	0	1.000	--	9	2	.818
Ateneo Lady Eagles	2	1	.667	1	8	3	.727
SWU Lady Cobras	1	2	.333	2	3	6	.333
Benilde Lady Blazers	0	3	.000	3	0	9	.000

Qualified to the semifinals

=== Final round ===
- All series are best-of-3

Semifinals
1D	UST Growling Tigresses	2	3	3
2C	Lyceum Lady Pirates	3	0	1
1C	San Sebastian Lady Stags	3	3
2D	Ateneo Lady Eagles	0	2

Finals
UST Growling Tigresses	3	2	3
San Sebastian Lady Stags	1	3	1
3rd place
Lyceum Lady Pirates	2	0
Ateneo Lady Eagles	3	3

Final standings

Rank	Team
1st place, gold medalist(s)	University of Santo Tomas
2nd place, silver medalist(s)	San Sebastian College–Recoletos
3rd place, bronze medalist(s)	Ateneo de Manila University
4	Lyceum of the Philippines University
5	Adamson University
6	Southwestern University
7	University of St. La Salle
8	College of St. Benilde
9	Far Eastern University
10	University of San Jose–Recoletos

Individual awards

Award		Name
Most Valuable Player	Finals: Conference:	(Philippines) Aiza Maizo ( UST) (Philippines) Sue Roces ( San Sebastian)
Best Scorer		(Thailand) Jaroensri Bualee ( San Sebastian)
Best Attacker		(Philippines) Aiza Maizo ( UST)
Best Blocker		(Philippines) Nasella Nica Gulliman ( Lyceum)
Best Server		(Philippines) Nicolette Ann Tabafunda ( Lyceum)
Best Setter		(Philippines) Jenelyn Belen ( San Sebastian)
Best Digger		(Philippines) Lizlee Ann Gata ( Adamson)
Best Receiver		(Thailand) Pornthip Santrong ( Lyceum)
Most Improved Player		(Philippines) Analyn Joy Benito ( San Sebastian)

== 2nd Conference ==
The Shakey's V-League 7th Season Open Conference was the twelfth conference of Shakey's V-League, commenced on July 10, 2010 at The Arena in San Juan.

=== Participating teams ===
Abbr.	Team
ADM	Ateneo de Manila University Lady Eagles
ADU	Adamson University Lady Falcons
CSB	College of St. Benilde Lady Blazers
FEU	Far Eastern University Lady Tamaraws
LPU	Lyceum of the Philippines University Lady Pirates
NUI	National University Lady Bulldogs
SSC	San Sebastian College–Recoletos Lady Stags
UPH	University of Perpetual Help Lady Altas

=== Preliminary round ===
Team	W	L	PCT	GB	SW	SL	Avg	PO
San Sebastian Lady Stags	6	1	.857	--	20	3	.870	
Adamson Lady Falcons	5	2	.714	1	17	11	.607	
Ateneo Lady Eagles	5	2	.714	1	16	12	.571	
Lyceum Lady Pirates	4	3	.571	2	16	11	.593	
FEU Lady Tamaraws	4	3	.571	2	12	13	.480	
NU Lady Bulldogs	2	5	.286	4	7	17	.292	
Perpetual Lady Altas	2	5	.286	4	8	18	.286	
Benilde Lady Blazers	0	7	.000	5	6	21	.222	

- SW = sets won; SL = sets lost

Qualified to the semifinals
Qualified to sixth-seed playoffs

=== Quarterfinals ===
Team	W	L	PCT	GB	SW	SL	Avg	PO
Adamson Lady Falcons	5	0	MAX	--	15	3	.696	
San Sebastian Lady Stags	4	1	4.000	1	14	5	.810	
Lyceum Lady Pirates	3	2	1.500	2	10	8	.578	
FEU Lady Tamaraws	2	3	0.667	3	8	8	.489	
Ateneo Lady Eagles	1	4	0.250	3	6	13	.468	
NU Lady Bulldogs	0	5	0.000	4	3	15	.238	

Qualified to the semifinals
Qualified to fourth-seed playoffs

=== Final round ===
- All series are best-of-3

Semifinals
1	San Sebastian Lady Stags	3	3
4	FEU Lady Tamaraws	1	2
2	Adamson Lady Falcons	3	3
3	Lyceum Lady Pirates	2	0

Finals
San Sebastian Lady Stags	1	3	0
Adamson Lady Falcons	3	1	3
3rd place
FEU Lady Tamaraws	0	1
Lyceum Lady Pirates	3	3

Final standings

Rank	Team
1st place, gold medalist(s)	Adamson University Lady Falcons
2nd place, silver medalist(s)	San Sebastian College–Recoletos Lady Stags
3rd place, bronze medalist(s)	Lyceum of the Philippines University Lady Pirates
4	Far Eastern University Lady Tamaraws
5	Ateneo de Manila University Lady Eagles
6	National University Lady Bulldogs
7	University of Perpetual Help Lady Altas
8	College of St. Benilde Lady Blazers

Individual awards

Award		Name
Most Valuable Player	Finals: Conference:	(Philippines) Nerissa Bautista ( Adamson) (Philippines) Sue Roces ( San Sebastian)
Best Scorer		(Thailand) Jaroensri Bualee ( San Sebastian)
Best Attacker		(Philippines) Mary Jean Balse ( Lyceum)
Best Blocker		(Philippines) Ma. Paulina Soriano ( Adamson)
Best Server		(Philippines) Rachel Daquis ( FEU)
Best Setter		(Philippines) Nicolette Ann Tabafunda ( Lyceum)
Best Digger		(Philippines) Angelica Vasquez ( Adamson)
Best Receiver		(Philippines) Angela Benting ( Adamson)
