= NCAA Season 81 =

Philippine athletic association event

- Host school: Colegio de San Juan de Letran
- Tagline: "One @ 81: Values Formation Through Sports"

General
- Seniors: Benilde Blazers
- Juniors: San Sebastian Staglets

Seniors' champions
Sport		Men	Women
Basketball		Letran	N/A

Juniors' champions
Sport		Boys	Girls
Basketball		San Sebastian	N/A
- (NT) = No tournament; (DS) = Demonstration Sport; (Ex) = Exhibition;

Octo-One, the mascot of the 81st season of the NCAA.

NCAA Season 81 was the 2005–06 season of the National Collegiate Athletic Association in the Philippines. Colegio de San Juan de Letran was the season's host.

To usher in the new season, Letran and the other NCAA member schools performed the opening ceremonies at the Araneta Coliseum, followed by four basketball games on June 25, 2005. Other disciplines started their own tournaments within the following months, with beach volleyball as the last tournament on mid-March.

De La Salle-College of Saint Benilde won its first General Championship honors for the Seniors division, while the San Sebastian Recoletos High School won its second Juniors General Championship, via tiebreakers, when La Salle Green Hills emerged with an equal number of points.

== Basketball ==
=== Seniors' tournament ===
==== Elimination round ====
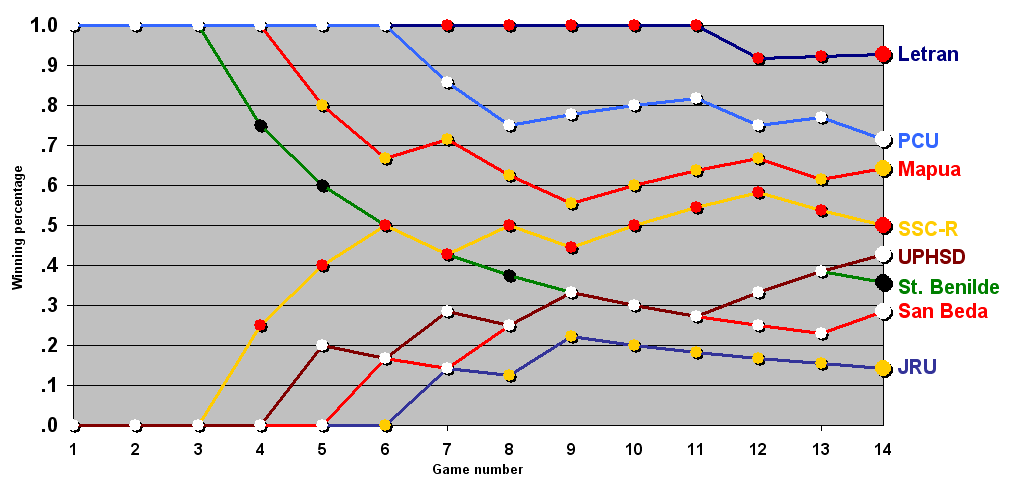
Team standings progression in the senior's basketball tournament.

Pos	Team	W	L	PCT	GB	Qualification
1	Letran Knights (H)	13	1	.929	—	Twice-to-beat in the semifinals
2	PCU Dolphins	10	4	.714	3	Twice-to-beat in the semifinals
3	Mapúa Cardinals	9	5	.643	4	Twice-to-win in the semifinals
4	San Sebastian Stags	7	7	.500	6	Twice-to-win in the semifinals
5	Perpetual Altas	6	8	.429	7	
6	Benilde Blazers	5	9	.357	8	
7	San Beda Red Lions	4	10	.286	9	
8	JRU Heavy Bombers	2	12	.143	11	

Source: ABS-CBN Sports
Rules for classification: 1) winning percentage; 2) if tied for top 4, one-game playoff; 3) head-to-head record; 4) head-to-head point differential; 5) overall point differential
(H) Hosts

==== Playoffs ====
Semifinals (Top 2 twice-to-beat)
1	Letran	93
4	San Sebastian	60
2	PCU	76
3	Mapúa	53

Finals (Best-of-three playoff)
1	Letran	74	78	62
2	PCU	79	60	54

==== Individual awards ====
- Most Valuable Player: Ernie Jay Sagad (CSB)
- Rookie of the Year: Kelvin dela Peña (Mapua)

=== Juniors' tournament ===
==== Elimination round ====
Pos	Team	W	L	PCT	GB	Qualification
1	San Sebastian Staglets	11	1	.917	—	Twice-to-beat in the semifinals
2	San Beda Red Cubs	10	2	.833	1	Twice-to-beat in the semifinals
3	PCU Baby Dolphins	7	5	.583 (Note: Third-seed playoff: PCU 96–90 JRU)	4	Twice-to-win in the semifinals
4	JRU Light Bombers	7	5	.583	4	Twice-to-win in the semifinals
5	La Salle Green Hills Greenies	5	7	.417	6	
6	Perpetual Altalettes	2	10	.167	9	
7	Letran Squires (Note: All of Letran's wins were forfeited when a player was found to have played in a ligang labas game.) (H)	0	12	.000	11	

Source: ABS-CBN Sports
Rules for classification: 1) winning percentage; 2) if tied for top 4, one-game playoff; 3) head-to-head record; 4) head-to-head point differential; 5) overall point differential
(H) Hosts

==== Playoffs ====
Semifinals (Top 2 twice-to-beat)
1	San Sebastian	95
4	JRU	82
2	San Beda	80
3	PCU	73

Finals (Best-of-three playoff)
1	San Sebastian	83	81
2	San Beda	76	69

==== Individual awards ====
- Most Valuable Player: Allan Mangahas (PCU-Union)
- Rookie of the Year: Darell Green (Letran)

== Other sports and General Championship ==
=== Championship results ===
Arranged by order of conclusion:

==== Juniors division ====
Event	Champion	1st Runner Up	2nd Runner Up
First Semester Events
Swimming	LSGH	UPHSD	San Sebastian
Basketball	San Sebastian	San Beda	PCU
Volleyball	San Sebastian	LSGH	PCU
Chess	San Sebastian	PCU	Letran
Taekwondo	Letran	LSGH	PCU
Second Semester Events
Table Tennis	Letran	San Sebastian	LSGH
Football	LSGH	San Beda	Letran
Tennis	San Sebastian	San Beda	UPHSD
Track & Field	LSGH	Letran	PCU

==== Seniors division ====
Event	Champion	1st Runner Up	2nd Runner Up
First Semester Events
Swimming	San Beda	PCU	St. Benilde
Cheerleading¹	UPHSD	San Sebastian	Letran
Basketball	Letran	PCU	Mapua
Men's Volleyball	PCU	San Sebastian	Letran
Women's Volleyball	San Sebastian	PCU	Letran
Chess	St. Benilde	Mapua	Letran
Second Semester Events
Taekwondo	San Beda	St. Benilde	Letran
Men's Table Tennis	St. Benilde	Letran	San Sebastian
Women's Table Tennis	St. Benilde	PCU	Letran
Football	San Beda	St. Benilde	Mapua
Tennis	San Sebastian	San Beda	PCU
Men's Beach Volley	St. Benilde	Letran	PCU
Women's Beach Volley	St. Benilde	San Sebastian	Letran & PCU (tied)
Track & Field	PCU	Mapua	San Sebastian

¹ Not a part in the tabulation of the General Championship

=== General Championship ===
==== Seniors division ====
Rank	School	Points
1st	St. Benilde	233
2nd	PCU	207.5
3rd	San Sebastian	192.5
4th	Letran	168
5th	San Beda	136
6th	Mapua	78
7th	UPHSD	40
8th	JRU	11

==== Juniors division ====
Rank	School	Points
1st	San Sebastian¹	170
2nd	LSGH¹	170
3rd	Letran	127
4th	PCU	93
5th	San Beda	88
6th	UPHSD	70
7th	JRU	22
8th	Mapua²	0

¹ Since San Sebastian had more championships (4) than LSGH (3), San Sebastian won the General Championship, despite being tied for first place.
² Mapua did not send representatives in the Juniors division

== See also ==
- UAAP Season 68
