= Sue Roces =

Filipino volleyball player

Personal information
- Full name: Suzanne Roces
- Nickname: Sue
- Nationality: Filipino
- Born: January 17, 1985 (age 41)
- Hometown: Bulacan
- Height: 5 ft 10 in (1.78 m)
- Education: University of the East (2002–2006)

Volleyball information
- Position: Outside hitter

Career
Years	Teams
2007	UST Golden Tigresses
2008–2012	San Sebastian Lady Stags
2012	Ateneo Lady Eagles
2013–2015	PLDT Home Ultera
2014	PLDT Home TVolution
2016	BaliPure Purest Water Defenders
2017–2021	Perlas Spikers

National team
–	Philippines

Suzanne "Sue" Roces (born January 17, 1985), is a Filipino former volleyball player.

== Career ==
=== College ===
Sue Roces attended the University of the East for her collegiate studies and played the UE Lady Warriors women's volleyball team in the UAAP. She was named Rookie of the Year in 2002 in Season 65. She also competed in beach volleyball, helping UE clinch a silver medal in UAAP Season 69 for the 2006–07 academic year. She also played for UE at the Shakey's V-League in 2006.

=== Club ===
==== Shakey's V-League/PVL ====
After playing for the UE Lady Warriors at the Shakey's V-League in 2006, Roces has also played for other colleges as a guest player. In 2007, she played for the University of Santo Tomas. The following season, she competed for San Sebastian College – Recoletos helping the team win the season's 2nd Conference and with her being named the Finals MVP. She was also named the conference MVP for the 2010 season's 1st Conference. In 2012, Roces won the Open Conference with San Sebastian. She also played for Ateneo de Manila University in the same year, helping the squad win the 1st Conference.

She has also competed for non-collegiate sides in the Shakey's V-League. With the PLDT Home Ultera, Roces helped the team win the Open and the Reinforced Open Conferences in 2015. The following year Roces joined the BaliPure Purest Water Defenders.

Roces' last club was with the Perlas Spikers. She played from 2017 when the V-League was renamed as the Premier Volleyball League until 2021 during the Open Conference. She decided to retire from competitive volleyball in January 2022.

==== AVC Club Championship ====
Roces was part of the non-league PLDT Home TVolution team which competed at the 2014 Asian Women's Club Volleyball Championship.

=== National team ===
Roces has represented the Philippines internationally. She was part of the Philippine women's national team roster which took part in the 2014 FIVB Volleyball Women's World Championship Asian qualifiers. She also played with the national team at the 2015 VTV International Women's Volleyball Cup. As part of the Philippine national beach volleyball team, she competed at the 2008 Asian Beach Games and was paired with Michelle Carolino. The pair managed to advance to the round of 16.

== Personal life ==
Since 2020, Roces is a relationship with Sarah Asido, who is a host and beauty queen who represented the Philippines in the 2018 Ms. United Continents.
