= 2009 Shakey's V-League season =

2009 SVL season
- League: Shakey's V-League
- Sport: Volleyball
- TV partner: NBN-4

1st Conference
- Season champions: UST Growling Tigresses
- Runners-up: San Sebastian Lady Stags
- Season MVP: Mary Jean Balse

2nd Conference
- Season champions: UST Growling Tigresses
- Runners-up: Adamson Lady Falcons
- Season MVP: Aiza Maizo

Seasons
- ← 2008, 5th 7th, 2010 →

The 2009 Shakey's V-League (SVL) season was the sixth season of the Shakey's V-League. There were two indoor conferences for this season.

== 1st Conference ==
The Shakey's V-League 6th Season 1st Conference was the ninth conference of Shakey's V-League, a collegiate women's volleyball league in the Philippines founded in 2004. The conference started April 19, 2009 at the Filoil Flying V Centre (formerly The Arena), San Juan. UAAP champion La Salle decided not to compete and took a leave of absence; UP replaced the Lady Archers to complete the eight-team elimination round roster. US Ambassador Kristie Kenney was the guest speaker during the opening ceremony.

Venues

- Filoil Flying V Centre, San Juan
- Blue Eagle Gym, Quezon City

Participating teams

Abbr.	Team
ADM	Ateneo de Manila University Lady Eagles–OraCare
ADU	Adamson University Lady Falcons
CSB	College of St. Benilde Lady Blazers
FEU	Far Eastern University Lady Tamaraws
LPU	Lyceum of the Philippines University Lady Pirates
SSC	San Sebastian College–Recoletos Lady Stags
UPD	University of the Philippines Lady Maroons
USJ	University of San Jose–Recoletos Lady Jaguars
USL	University of St. La Salle Lady Stingers
UST	University of Santo Tomas Tigresses

=== Preliminary round ===
Team	W	L	PCT	GB	SW	SL	Avg	Tie
UST Growling Tigresses	6	1	.857	--	20	8	.714	1–0
San Sebastian Lady Stags	6	1	.857	--	20	6	.769	0–1
FEU Lady Tamaraws	5	2	.714	1	16	8	.667	
Adamson Lady Falcons	4	3	.571	2	14	13	.519	
Ateneo–OraCare	4	3	.571	2	12	12	.500	
Benilde Lady Blazers	2	5	.286	3	9	19	.321	
Lyceum Lady Pirates	1	6	.142	5	12	19	.387	
UP Lady Maroons	0	7	.000	6	3	21	.125	

Qualified to the quarterfinals
Qualified to fourth-seed playoffs

Exhibition game

Date	Time	Teams	Set	1	2	3	4	5	Total	Report
May 17	14:00	USLS Lady Stingers	3	25	22	25	25	–	97	
May 17	14:00	USJ–R Lady Jaguars	1	20	25	22	23	–	90	

Fourth-seed playoffs

Date	Time	Teams	Set	1	2	3	4	5	Total	Report
May 17	16:00	Adamson Lady Falcons	3	23	25	26	20	15	109	
May 17	16:00	Ateneo–OraCare	2	25	18	24	25	10	102	

=== Quarterfinals ===
Team	W	L	PCT	GB	SW	SL	Avg
UST Growling Tigresses	5	0	1.000	--	15	4	.789
San Sebastian Lady Stags	4	1	.800	1	13	5	.722
Adamson Lady Falcons	3	2	.600	2	12	6	.667
FEU Lady Tamaraws	2	3	.400	3	7	10	.411
USLS Lady Stingers	1	4	.200	4	5	12	.294
USJ–R Lady Jaguars	0	5	.000	5	0	15	.000

Qualified to the semifinals

=== Final round ===
- All series are best-of-3

Semifinals
1	UST Growling Tigresses	3	1	3
4	FEU Lady Tamaraws	1	3	0
2	San Sebastian Lady Stags	3	3
3	Adamson Lady Falcons	0	0

Finals
UST Growling Tigresses	0	3	3
San Sebastian Lady Stags	3	0	0
3rd place
FEU Lady Tamaraws	1	0
Adamson Lady Falcons	3	3

Final standings

Rank	Team
1st place, gold medalist(s)	University of Santo Tomas
2nd place, silver medalist(s)	San Sebastian College–Recoletos
3rd place, bronze medalist(s)	Adamson University
4	Far Eastern University
5	University of St. La Salle
6	University of San Jose–Recoletos
7	Ateneo de Manila University
8	College of St. Benilde
9	Lyceum of the Philippines University
10	University of the Philippines

Individual awards

Award		Name
Most Valuable Player	Finals: Conference:	(Philippines) Rhea Dimaculangan ( UST) (Philippines) Mary Jean Balse ( UST)
Best Scorer		(Thailand) Jaroensri Bualee ( San Sebastian)
Best Attacker		(Philippines) Laurence Anne Latigay ( San Sebastian)
Best Blocker		(Philippines) Aiza Maizo ( UST)
Best Server		(Philippines) Mecaila Irish May Morada ( FEU)
Best Setter		(Philippines) Mary Jean Balse ( UST)
Best Digger		(Philippines) Lizlee Ann Gata ( Adamson)
Best Receiver		(Philippines) Margarita Pepito ( San Sebastian)
Most Improved Player		(Philippines) Shaira Gonzalez ( FEU)

== 2nd Conference ==
The Shakey's V-League 6th Season Open Conference was the tenth conference of Shakey's V-League, commenced on October 11, 2009 at The Arena in San Juan.

Participating teams

Abbr.	Team
ADM	Ateneo de Manila University Lady Eagles
ADU	Adamson University Lady Falcons
CSB	College of St. Benilde Lady Blazers
FEU	Far Eastern University Lady Tamaraws
LPU	Lyceum of the Philippines University Lady Pirates
SSC	San Sebastian College–Recoletos Lady Stags
UPD	University of the Philippines Lady Maroons
UST	University of Santo Tomas Tigresses

=== Preliminary round ===
Team	W	L	PCT	GB	SW	SL	Avg
UST Growling Tigresses	7	0	1.000	--	21	3	.875
FEU Lady Tamaraws	6	1	.833	1	19	8	.704
San Sebastian Lady Stags	5	2	.714	2	14	9	.609
Ateneo Lady Eagles	4	3	.571	3	16	12	.571
Adamson Lady Falcons	3	4	.429	4	15	15	.500
Benilde Lady Blazers	2	5	.286	5	7	15	.318
Lyceum Lady Pirates	1	6	.143	6	6	19	.240
UP Lady Maroons	0	7	.000	7	2	21	.087

Qualified to the quarterfinals

=== Quarterfinals ===
Team	W	L	PCT	GB	SW	SL	Avg	PO
UST Growling Tigresses	10	2	.833	--	33	11	.750	
San Sebastian Lady Stags	8	4	.667	2	27	20	.574	
Adamson Lady Falcons	7	5	.583	3	28	20	.583	
FEU Lady Tamaraws	7	5	.583	3	27	21	.563	
Ateneo Lady Eagles	7	5	.583	3	26	22	.542	
Benilde Lady Blazers	3	9	.250	7	12	27	.308	

Qualified to the semifinals
Qualified to fourth-seed playoffs

Fourth-seed playoffs

Date	Time	Teams	Set	1	2	3	4	5	Total	Report
Nov 22	16:00	FEU Lady Tamaraws	3	25	22	25	25	15	112	
Nov 22	16:00	Ateneo Lady Eagles	2	12	25	27	19	9	92	

=== Final round ===
- All series are best-of-3

Semifinals
1	UST Growling Tigresses	3	3
4	FEU Lady Tamaraws	0	1
2	San Sebastian Lady Stags	2	0
3	Adamson Lady Falcons	3	3

Finals
UST Growling Tigresses	3	3
Adamson Lady Falcons	1	1
3rd place
FEU Lady Tamaraws	3	3
San Sebastian Lady Stags	2	2

Final standings

Rank	Team
1st place, gold medalist(s)	University of Santo Tomas
2nd place, silver medalist(s)	Adamson University
3rd place, bronze medalist(s)	Far Eastern University
4	San Sebastian College–Recoletos
5	Ateneo de Manila University
6	College of St. Benilde
7	Lyceum of the Philippines University
8	University of the Philippines

Individual awards

Award		Name
Most Valuable Player	Finals: Conference:	(Philippines) Aiza Maizo ( UST)
Best Scorer		(Philippines) Angela Benting ( Adamson)
Best Attacker		(Philippines) Giza Yumang ( Benilde)
Best Blocker		(Philippines) Ma. Paulina Soriano ( Adamson)
Best Server		(Philippines) Cherry Mae Vivas ( FEU)
Best Setter		(Philippines) April Linor Jose ( FEU)
Best Digger		(Philippines) Stephanie Gabriel ( Ateneo)
Best Receiver		(Philippines) Lizlee Ann Gata ( Adamson)
