= SVL Collegiate Conference =

Running since 2015, the Collegiate Conference is the tournament held by the Shakey's V-League (SVL), a Filipino women's volleyball league. The tournament will be participated by various universities and colleges in the Philippines.

== List of Collegiate Conference champions ==
=== Per season ===
Season	Champion	Runner-up	Series	Details
Season 10	National University Lady Bulldogs	Ateneo	2–1	SVL 10th Season
Season 11	FEU Lady Tamaraws	NU	2–0	SVL 11th Season
Season 12	National University Lady Bulldogs	Ateneo	2–1	SVL 12th Season
Season 13	National University Lady Bulldogs	Ateneo	2–0	SVL 13th Season
