= 2008 Shakey's V-League season =

2008 SVL season
- League: Shakey's V-League
- Sport: Volleyball
- TV partner(s): NBN-4

1st Conference
- Season champions: Adamson Lady Falcons
- Runners-up: Ateneo Lady Eagles
- Season MVP: Nerissa Bautista

2nd Conference
- Season champions: San Sebastian Lady Stags
- Runners-up: UST Tigresses
- Season MVP: Laurence Anne Latigay

Seasons
- ← 2007, 4th 6th, 2009 →

The 2008 Shakey's V-League (SVL) season was the fifth season of the Shakey's V-League. There were two indoor conferences for this season.

== 1st Conference ==
The Shakey's V-League 5th Season 1st Conference was the seventh conference of Shakey's V-League, a collegiate women's volleyball league in the Philippines founded in 2004. The conference started March 30, 2008, at the Filoil Flying V Centre (formerly The Arena), San Juan.

Participating teams

Abbr.	Team
ADM	Ateneo de Manila University Lady Eagles
ADU	Adamson University Lady Falcons
CSB	College of St. Benilde Lady Blazers
FEU	Far Eastern University Lady Tamaraws
LPU	Lyceum of the Philippines University Lady Pirates
SSC	San Sebastian College–Recoletos Lady Stags
USJ	University of San Jose–Recoletos Lady Jaguars
USL	University of St. La Salle Lady Stingers

=== Preliminary round ===
Rank	Team	Win	Loss	SW	SL	PCT
1	San Sebastian Lady Stags	9	1	27	3	90%
2	Adamson Lady Falcons	9	1	27	6	81%
3	Lyceum Lady Pirates	7	3	16	22	42%
4	Ateneo Lady Eagles	6	4	16	23	41%
5	FEU Lady Tamaraws	4	6	15	25	38%
6	Benilde Lady Blazers	0	10	4	30	12%

Qualified to the semifinals
Qualified to the quarterfinals

=== Quarterfinals ===
Rank	Team	Win	Loss	SW	SL	PCT
1	Ateneo Lady Eagles	5	0	15	2	88%
2	Lyceum Lady Pirates	4	1	12	5	71%
3	USLS Lady Stingers	2	3	9	10	47%
4	USJ–R Lady Jaguars	2	3	9	11	45%
5	FEU Lady Tamaraws	1	4	6	14	30%
6	Benilde Lady Blazers	1	4	3	12	20%

Qualified to the semifinals

=== Semifinals ===
Pos	Team	Pld	W	L	Pts	SW	SL	SR	SPW	SPL	SPR	Qualification
1	Adamson Lady Falcons	3	2	1	6	7	5	1.400	283	259	1.093	Finals
2	Ateneo Lady Eagles	3	2	1	4	7	7	1.000	290	303	0.957	Finals
3	San Sebastian Lady Stags	3	1	2	4	6	6	1.000	261	248	1.052	
4	Lyceum Lady Pirates	3	1	2	4	5	7	0.714	248	272	0.912	

Match results

- All times are in Philippines Standard Time (UTC+08:00)

Date	Time	Teams	Set	1	2	3	4	5	Total	Report
May 20	14:00	San Sebastian Lady Stags	3	25	25	25			75	
May 20	14:00	Lyceum Lady Pirates	0	16	19	16			51	
May 20	16:00	Adamson Lady Falcons	3	25	20	25	25		95	
May 20	16:00	Ateneo Lady Eagles	1	16	25	22	21		84	
May 23	14:00	Lyceum Lady Pirates	3	25	25	18	25		93	
May 23	14:00	Adamson Lady Falcons	1	23	22	25	22		92	
May 23	16:00	Ateneo Lady Eagles	3	14	25	22	25	15	101	
May 23	16:00	San Sebastian Lady Stags	2	25	19	25	22	13	104	
May 25	12:00	Ateneo Lady Eagles	3	18	20	27	25	15	105	
May 25	12:00	Lyceum Lady Pirates	2	25	25	25	20	9	104	
May 25	14:00	Adamson Lady Falcons	3	25	25	21	25		96	
May 25	14:00	San Sebastian Lady Stags	1	17	19	25	21		82	

=== Finals ===
3rd place

Date	Time	Teams	Set	1	2	3	4	5	Total	Report
May 27	14:00	San Sebastian Lady Stags	3	25	27	25			77	
May 27	14:00	Lyceum Lady Pirates	0	17	25	23			65	
May 30	14:00	San Sebastian Lady Stags	3	25	25	25			75	
May 30	14:00	Lyceum Lady Pirates	0	18	14	17			49	

Championship

Date	Time	Teams	Set	1	2	3	4	5	Total	Report
May 27	16:00	Adamson Lady Falcons	3	25	25	23	25		98	
May 27	16:00	Ateneo Lady Eagles	1	7	14	25	22		68	
May 30	16:00	Adamson Lady Falcons	3	25	25	25			75	
May 30	16:00	Ateneo Lady Eagles	0	17	13	17			47	

Final standings

Rank	Team
1st place, gold medalist(s)	Adamson University
2nd place, silver medalist(s)	Ateneo de Manila University
3rd place, bronze medalist(s)	San Sebastian College–Recoletos
4	Lyceum of the Philippines University
5	University of St. La Salle
6	University of San Jose–Recoletos
7	Far Eastern University
8	College of St. Benilde

Individual awards

Award		Name
Most Valuable Player	Finals: Conference:	(Philippines) Rissa Jane Laguilles ( Adamson) (Philippines) Nerissa Bautista ( Adamson)
Best Scorer		(Philippines) Beverly Boto ( Lyceum)
Best Attacker		(Thailand) Jaroensri Bualee ( San Sebastian)
Best Blocker		(Philippines) Ma. Rosario Soriano ( Ateneo)
Best Server		(Philippines) Angela Benting ( Adamson)
Best Setter		(Philippines) Janet Serafica ( Adamson)
Best Digger		(Philippines) Lizlee Ann Gata ( Adamson)
Best Receiver		(Philippines) Mary Jane Pepito ( San Sebastian)

== 2nd Conference ==
Participating teams

Abbr.	Team
ADM	Ateneo de Manila University Lady Eagles
ADU	Adamson University Lady Falcons
CSB	College of St. Benilde Lady Blazers
DLS	De La Salle University Lady Archers
FEU	Far Eastern University Lady Tamaraws
LPU	Lyceum of the Philippines University Lady Pirates
SSC	San Sebastian College–Recoletos Lady Stags
UST	University of Santo Tomas Tigresses

=== Preliminary round ===
#	Team	W	L	PW	PL	PQ
1	UST Tigresses	6	1	608	575	1.057
2	San Sebastian Lady Stags	5	2	612	518	1.181
3	De La Salle Lady Archers	5	2	624	546	1.143
4	Adamson Lady Falcons	5	2	596	541	1.102
5	FEU Lady Tamaraws	3	4	509	537	0.948
6	Lyceum Lady Pirates	2	5	462	523	0.883
7	Ateneo Lady Eagles	1	6	567	639	0.887
8	Benilde Lady Blazers	1	6	440	552	0.797

Qualified to the semifinals

=== Final round ===
- All series are best-of-3

Semifinals
1	UST Tigresses	1	3	3
4	Adamson Lady Falcons	3	1	2
2	San Sebastian Lady Stags	3	3
3	De La Salle Lady Archers	2	2

Finals
UST Tigresses	0	1
San Sebastian Lady Stags	3	3
3rd place
Adamson Lady Falcons	3	1
De La Salle Lady Archers	2	3

Final standings

Rank	Team
1st place, gold medalist(s)	San Sebastian College–Recoletos
2nd place, silver medalist(s)	University of Santo Tomas
3rd place, bronze medalist(s)	De La Salle University
4	Adamson University
5	Far Eastern University
6	Lyceum of the Philippines University
7	Ateneo de Manila University
8	College of St. Benilde

Individual awards

Award		Name
Most Valuable Player	Finals: Conference:	(Philippines) Suzanne Roces ( San Sebastian) (Philippines) Laurence Anne Latigay ( San Sebastian)
Best Scorer		(Philippines) Laurence Anne Latigay ( San Sebastian)
Best Attacker		(Philippines) Rysabelle Devanadera ( San Sebastian)
Best Blocker		(Philippines) Jacqueline Alarca ( La Salle)
Best Server		(Philippines) Aiza Maizo ( UST)
Best Setter		(Philippines) Janet Serafica ( Adamson)
Best Digger		(Philippines) Lizlee Ann Gata ( Adamson)
Best Receiver		(Philippines) Mary Jane Pepito ( San Sebastian)
