= 2005 Shakey's V-League season =

2005 SVL season
- League: Shakey's V-League
- Sport: Volleyball
- TV partner: IBC-13

1st Conference
- Season champions: De La Salle Lady Archers
- Runners-up: UST Growling Tigresses
- Season MVP: Maureen Penetrante (La Salle)

Seasons
- ← 2004, 1st 3rd, 2006 →

The 2005 Shakey's V-League (SVL) season was the 2nd season of the Shakey's V-League.

== 1st conference ==
The Shakey's V-League 2nd Season 1st Conference was the 3rd conference of the Shakey's V-League. The tournament was held from May 2005 until July 2005.

=== Participating teams ===
| Abbr. | Team | Ref. |
|---|---|---|
| ADMU | Ateneo de Manila University Lady Eagles | |
| DLSU | De La Salle University Lady Archers | |
| FEU | Far Eastern University Lady Tamaraws | |
| LPU | Lyceum of the Philippines University Lady Pirates | |
| SSC-R | San Sebastian College–Recoletos Lady Stags | |
| UST | University of Santo Tomas Tigresses | |

=== Final standings ===
| Rank | Team | Ref. |
|---|---|---|
| 1st place, gold medalist(s) | De La Salle University | |
| 2nd place, silver medalist(s) | University of Santo Tomas | |
| 3rd place, bronze medalist(s) | San Sebastian College–Recoletos | |
| 4 | Ateneo de Manila University | |
| 5 | Far Eastern University | |
| 6 | Lyceum of the Philippines University | |

=== Individual awards ===
| Award | Name | Ref. |
|---|---|---|
| Most Valuable Player | Maureen Penetrante ( La Salle) | |
| Best Scorer | Cherry Rose Macatangay ( San Sebastian) | |
| Best Attacker | Roxanne Pimentel ( UST) | |
| Best Blocker | Michelle Laborte ( Ateneo) | |
| Best Server | Mary Jean Balse ( UST) | |
| Best Setter | Relea Ferina Saet ( La Salle) | |
| Best Digger | Sharmaine Miles Peñano ( La Salle) | |
| Best Receiver | Genelyn Alemania ( FEU) | |

== Venues ==
- Lyceum Gym, Intramuros, Manila
- PhilSports Arena, Pasig
- Rizal Memorial Coliseum, Manila
