= 2010 Shakey's V-League 1st Conference =

Shakey's V-League 7th Season
Women's Finals	G1	G2	G3	Wins
UST Growling Tigresses	3	2	3	2
San Sebastian Lady Stags	1	3	1	1
- Arena(s): Filoil Flying V Arena
- Finals MVP: Aiza Maizo
- Semifinalists: Ateneo Lady Eagles; Lyceum Lady Pirates
- TV network(s): NBN

The 2010 Shakey's V-League 1st Conference was the 11th conference of the Shakey's V-League and the first conference of the 2010 season. It was held in April 2010 at the Filoil Flying V Arena. Second Conference shall be governed by the FIVB Official Volleyball Rules. The participating teams is the same as the last conference, but without the two Visayan teams.

== Tournament format ==
- Preliminaries
  - The ten (10) participating teams will be divided into two pools. The top four (4) teams in each pool will advance to the quarterfinals.
  - In the event of a two-way tie for 4th place, the tie will be resolved by a play-off game.
- Quarter-finals
  - The number one and number three seeded teams in each pool will be taken and will compose a new pool while the number two and number four seeded teams will make up the other pool.
  - Another round robin will be played in the set of pools with the record of a team against another team whom they previously met in the eliminations will be carried over.
  - If two teams are tied for 2nd place, FIVB Rules shall apply to determine the best two which will play-off to resolve the tie.
- Semi-finals
  - A best-of-three series will be played between the 1st seed of a pool and the 2nd seed of the other pool.
- Finals
  - A best-of-three series will be played between the 2 winners of the semis for the gold.
  - A best-of-three series will be played between the 2 losers of the semis for the bronze.
  - If the gold medalist is determined in two (2) games, the series for the bronze medal will also end in two (2) games. If the contenders for the bronze are tied after two (2) games, then FIVB Rules will determine the winner.

== Eliminations ==
=== Pool A ===
Qualified for quarterfinals

Team	W	L	PCT	GB	SW	SL	Avg
San Sebastian Lady Stags	4	0	1.000	--	12	1	.923
UST Growling Tigresses	3	1	.750	1	9	4	.692
USLS Lady Stingers	2	2	.500	2	8	7	.533
SWU Lady Cobras	1	3	.250	3	4	9	.308
FEU Lady Tamaraws	0	4	.000	4	0	12	.0

=== Pool B ===
Qualified for quarterfinals

Team	W	L	PCT	GB	SW	SL	Avg
Adamson Lady Falcons	3	1	.750	--	10	6	.625
Ateneo Lady Eagles	3	1	.750	1	11	3	.786
Lyceum Lady Pirates	3	1	.750	2	9	5	.643
Benilde Lady Blazers	1	3	.250	3	5	9	.357
USJ–R Lady Jaguars	0	4	.000	4	0	12	.0

== Quarterfinals ==
=== Pool C ===
Qualified for semifinals

Team	W	L	PCT	GB	SW	SL	Avg
San Sebastian Lady Stags	2	1	.667	--	8	3	.727
Lyceum Lady Pirates	2	1	.667	1	6	6	.500
Adamson Lady Falcons	1	2	.333	2	4	6	.400
USLS Lady Stingers	1	2	.333	3	3	9	.250

=== Pool D ===
Qualified for semifinals

Team	W	L	PCT	GB	SW	SL	Avg
UST Growling Tigresses	3	0	1.000	--	9	2	.818
Ateneo Lady Eagles	2	1	.667	1	8	3	.727
SWU Lady Cobras	1	2	.333	2	3	6	.333
Benilde Lady Blazers	0	3	.000	3	0	9	.000

== Bracket ==
Best-of-3 semifinals
1D	UST	2
2C	Lyceum	1
1C	San Sebastian	2
2D	Ateneo	0

Best-of-3 Finals
1D	UST	2
1C	San Sebastian	1
Best-of-3 third-place
2C	Lyceum	0
2D	Ateneo	2

== Semifinals ==
=== UST vs. Lyceum ===
May 16, 2:00PM – Filoil Flying V Arena, San Juan
Team	1	2	3	4	5	Sets
UST	32	15	25	23	10	2
Lyceum	30	25	23	25	15	3

Lyceum leads series, 1-0

May 18, 4:00PM – Filoil Flying V Arena, San Juan
Team	1	2	3	Sets
Lyceum	18	23	22	0
UST	25	25	25	3

Series Tied, 1-1

May 20, 4:00PM – Filoil Flying V Arena, San Juan
Team	1	2	3	4	Sets
UST	25	21	25	25	3
Lyceum	19	25	17	18	1

UST wins series, 2-1

=== San Sebastian vs. Ateneo ===
November 16, 4:00PM – Filoil Flying V Arena, San Juan
Team	1	2	3	Sets
San Sebastian	25	25	25	3
Ateneo	21	18	18	0

SSC-R leads series, 1-0

November 18, 2:00PM – Filoil Flying V Arena, San Juan
Team	1	2	3	4	5	Sets
Ateneo	25	22	25	21	12	2
San Sebastian	21	25	23	25	15	3

SSC-R wins series, 2-0

== Finals ==
=== Bronze series ===
May 23, 2:00PM – Filoil Flying V Arena, San Juan
Team	1	2	3	4	5	Sets
Ateneo	19	25	25	20	15	3
Lyceum	25	15	21	25	10	2

Ateneo leads series, 1-0

May 25, 2:00PM – Filoil Flying V Arena, San Juan
Team	1	2	3	Sets
Lyceum	23	23	17	0
Ateneo	25	25	25	3

Ateneo wins series, 2-0

=== Championship series ===
May 23, 4:00PM – Filoil Flying V Arena, San Juan
Team	1	2	3	4	Sets
UST	25	22	25	25	3
San Sebastian	21	25	20	15	1

UST leads series, 1-0

May 25, 4:00PM – Filoil Flying V Arena, San Juan
Team	1	2	3	4	5	Sets
San Sebastian	21	25	15	25	15	3
UST	25	16	25	20	13	2

Series Tied, 1-1

May 27, 4:00PM – Filoil Flying V Arena, San Juan
Team	1	2	3	4	Sets
UST	25	25	25	25	3
San Sebastian	21	27	12	15	1

UST wins series, 2-1

=== Final ranking ===
- Champion - UST Growling Tigresses
- 1st runner-up - San Sebastian Lady Stags
- 2nd runner-up - Ateneo Lady Eagles
- 3rd runner-up - Lyceum Lady Pirates

=== Awards ===
- Best scorer: Jaroensri Bualee (SSC-R)
- Best attacker: Aiza Maizo (UST)
- Best blocker: Nasella Nica Gulliman (Lyceum)
- Best setter: Jenelyn Belen (SSC-R)
- Best digger: Lizlee Ann Gata (Adamson)
- Best server: Nicolette Ann Tabafunda (Lyceum)
- Best receiver: Pornthip Santrong (Lyceum)
- Conference MVP: Suzanne Roces (SSC-R)
- Finals MVP: Aiza Maizo (UST)
