= 2008 Shakey's V-League 1st Conference =

V-League 5th Season
Women's Finals	G1	G2	Wins
Adamson Lady Falcons	3	3	2
Ateneo Lady Eagles	1	0	0
- Arena(s): Filoil Flying V Arena
- Finals MVP: Rissa Jane Laguilles
- Semifinalists: Lyceum Lady Pirates
- TV network(s): NBN

The 2008 Shakey's V-League 1st Conference was the seventh conference of the Shakey's V-League and the first conference of the 2008 season. The tournament began on March 30, 2008, and ended on May 30, 2008, at The Arena in the city of San Juan. Joining are NCR teams Ateneo de Manila University, Adamson University, College of Saint Benilde, Far Eastern University, Lyceum of the Philippines University, San Sebastian College - Recoletos, and Visayas teams University of Saint La Salle and University of San Jose - Recoletos

Adamson University finally broke its runner-up "curse" by winning over Ateneo de Manila University in two games to none in the finals series. This makes them the third champion team, alongside University of Santo Tomas and De La Salle University.

== Tournament Format ==
- Double Round Robin Preliminaries. If a team is seeded at 1 and 2, they will automatically have a slot in the Semifinals and will skip the Quarterfinals.
- All remaining Manila and Visayas teams will merge in a Single Round Robin affair.
- Top two teams with the best record after the single-round robin quarterfinals will advance to the semifinals
  - However, If a team won 3 out of 5 games in the quarterfinals, they will have a chance for a playoff berth against the second seed team for the right to enter the semifinals
- The automatic semifinalists and the quarterfinalist advancers will now move on to the Single Round Robin Semifinals. Whoever seeds 1 and 2, will make it to the best of three championship series.
  - There will be a playoff if seeds 2 and 3 will be tied once more.
- Best of Three Championship series
  - If the battle for the gold ended in two games only, the battle for the bronze will be best of three also instead of one game.

== Starting Line-ups ==
SEASON 5, CONFERENCE 1
School	Setter	Middle	Open	Utility	Middle	Open	Libero
Adamson	Janet Serafica	Rissa Jane Laguilles	Nerissa Bautista*; Jill Gustilo	Michelle Segodine	Jacqueline So; Nerissa Bautista*	Angela Benting	Lizlee Ann Gata
Ateneo	Karla Bello/Trisha Limengco	Ma. Rosario Soriano	Patricia Lynn Taganas/Averil Paje	Ma. Carmina Denise Acevedo	Misha Quimpo	Phanusit Em-orn*/Jindarat Kanchana*	Stephanie Gabriel
Benilde	Anna Katrina Maranan; Renilyn Kara Agero	Cindy Velasquez; Lilet Mabbayad*	Katty Kwan	Thelma Barrina-Rojas*; Doreen Sanchez; LC Girly Quemada	Giza Yumang; Doreen Sanchez	Doreen Sanchez; Giza Yumang; Kerlyne Joy Mulingtapang	Zarah Lasac
Far Eastern	April Linor Jose	Mary Rose Cabanag	Shaira Gonzalez	Marigail Tolentino; Dianne Torres*	Mecaila Irish May Morada	Cherry May Vivas	Rose Anne Taganas
Lyceum	Mary Grace Babalo; Bernadette Satsatin	Beverly Boto	Syvie Gay Artates	Bernadette Satsatin; Jamie Rose Pena	Dahlia Cruz	Jane Kathleen Jarin	Joanna Marie De La Peña
Saint La Salle	Laedy Cepeda; Era Shane Celis	Kay Aplasca	Sheryl Silva	Je-an Ledesma; Beauty Denila	Loverich Jade Aplasca	Patty Orendain*	Realyn Valeriano
San Jose	Michelle Anne Simbajon	Julet Mae Marikit; Rachelle Hannah Singson	Mechel Matuguina*	Cristy Aina Laroga	Genie Sabas	Mary Joy Bonita	Gwendolyn Gutang
San Sebastian	Charisse Vernon Ancheta	Suzanne Roces; Melissa Mirasol	Jinni Mondejar; Jaroensri Bualee	Margarita Pepito; Jinni Mondejar	Rysabelle Devanadera	Laurence Ann Latigay	Mary Jane Pepito

== Eliminations Standing ==
QUALIFIED FOR SEMIS	QUALIFIED FOR QUARTERS

Rank	Team	Win	Loss	Sets Won	Sets Lost	Percentage
1	San Sebastian College - Recoletos	9	1	27	3	90%
2	Adamson University	9	1	27	6	81%
3	Lyceum of the Philippines University	7	3	16	22	42%
4	Ateneo de Manila University	6	4	16	23	41%
5	Far Eastern University	4	6	15	25	38%
6	College of Saint Benilde	0	10	4	30	12%

== Preliminaries ==
Date	Time	Venue		Score		Set 1	Set 2	Set 3	Set 4	Set 5	Total	Report
Mar. 30	2:00 pm	The Arena, San Juan	Ateneo Lady Eagles	–	Lyceum Lady Pirates	–	–	–			0–0	
Mar. 30	4:00 pm	The Arena, San Juan	San Sebastian Lady Stags	–	Benilde Lady Blazers	–	–	–			0–0	
Apr. 1	2:00 pm	The Arena, San Juan	Lyceum Lady Pirates	–	Adamson Lady Falcons	–	–	–			0–0	
Apr. 1	4:00 pm	The Arena, San Juan	Benilde Lady Blazers	–	FEU Lady Tamaraws	–	–	–			0–0	
Apr. 4	2:00 pm	The Arena, San Juan	Ateneo Lady Eagles	–	Benilde Lady Blazers	–	–	–			0–0	
Apr. 4	4:00 pm	The Arena, San Juan	San Sebastian Lady Stags	–	Lyceum Lady Pirates	–	–	–			0–0	

START OF ELIMINATIONS
TIME	MARCH 30 - THE AR						
TIME	Team	1st	2nd	3rd	4th	5th	Best Player
1 PM	OPENING CEREMONIES						
2 PM	Ateneo de Manila University	25	29	25	-	-	Ma. Rosario Soriano
2 PM	Lyceum of the Philippines University	23	27	17	-	-	Beverly Boto
4 PM	San Sebastian College - Recoletos	25	25	25	-	-	Laurence Ann Latigay
4 PM	College of Saint Benilde	11	18	23	-	-	Anna Katrina Maranan
TIME	APRIL 1 - THE ARENA, SAN JUAN						
TIME	Team	1st	2nd	3rd	4th	5th	Best Player
2 PM	Lyceum of the Philippines University	17	23	23			Beverly Boto
2 PM	Adamson University	25	25	25			Angelica Quinlog
4 PM	College of Saint Benilde	12	28	34	6	20	Cherry Rose Macatangay
4 PM	Far Eastern University	25	26	32	25	22	Rachelle Anne Daquis
TIME	APRIL 4 - THE ARENA, SAN JUAN						
TIME	Team	1st	2nd	3rd	4th	5th	Best Player
2 PM	Ateneo de Manila University	25	25	25	-	-	Misha Quimpo
2 PM	College of Saint Benilde	13	17	22	-	-	Katty Kwan
4 PM	San Sebastian College - Recoletos	25	25	25	-	-	Laurence Ann Latigay
4 PM	Lyceum of the Philippines University	18	23	12	-	-	Beverly Boto
TIME	APRIL 6 - THE ARENA, SAN JUAN						
TIME	Team	1st	2nd	3rd	4th	5th	Best Player
2 PM	Lyceum of the Philippines University	25	20	24	25	15	Beverly Boto
2 PM	Far Eastern University	23	25	26	16	8	Macaila Irish May Morada
4 PM	Adamson University	25	25	25	-	-	Angela Benting
4 PM	Ateneo de Manila University	15	20	18	-	-	Ma. Rosario Soriano
TIME	APRIL 8 - THE ARENA, SAN JUAN						
TIME	Team	1st	2nd	3rd	4th	5th	Best Player
2 PM	San Sebastian College - Recoletos	22	21	23	-	-	Suzanne Roces
2 PM	Adamson University	25	25	25	-	-	Nerissa Bautista
4 PM	Ateneo de Manila University	25	20	26	25	4	Ruby De Leon
4 PM	Far Eastern University	23	25	24	27	15	Wendy Anne Semana
TIME	APRIL 11 - THE ARENA, SAN JUAN						
TIME	Team	1st	2nd	3rd	4th	5th	Best Player
2 PM	Far Eastern University	15	12	17	-	-	Macaila Irish May Morada
2 PM	San Sebastian College - Recoletos	25	25	25	-	-	Laurence Ann Latigay
4 PM	Adamson University	25	25	25	-	-	Angela Benting
4 PM	College of Saint Benilde	19	12	13	-	-	Katty Kwan
TIME	APRIL 13 - THE ARENA, SAN JUAN						
TIME	Team	1st	2nd	3rd	4th	5th	Best Player
2 PM	Adamson University	25	25	25	-	-	Janet Serafica
2 PM	Far Eastern University	17	11	22	-	-	Macaila Irish May Morada
4 PM	Ateneo de Manila University	21	22	25	-	-	Patricia Lynn Taganas
4 PM	San Sebastian College - Recoletos	25	25	27	-	-	Charisse Vernon Ancheta
TIME	APRIL 15 - THE ARENA, SAN JUAN						
TIME	Team	1st	2nd	3rd	4th	5th	Best Player
2 PM	San Sebastian College - Recoletos	WD					
2 PM	College of Saint Benilde	LD					
4 PM	Adamson University	25	25	25	-	-	Rissa Jane Laguilles
4 PM	Far Eastern University	16	12	16	-	-	Marigail Tolentino
TIME	APRIL 18 - THE ARENA, SAN JUAN						
TIME	Team	1st	2nd	3rd	4th	5th	Best Player
2 PM	College of Saint Benilde	25	20	12	15	-	Cindy Velasquez
2 PM	Lyceum of the Philippines University	23	25	25	25	-	Jane Kathleen Jarin
4 PM	Far Eastern University	17	20	17	-	-	Macaila Irish May Morada
4 PM	San Sebastian College - Recoletos	25	25	25	-	-	Laurence Ann Latigay
TIME	APRIL 20 - THE ARENA, SAN JUAN						
TIME	Team	1st	2nd	3rd	4th	5th	Best Player
12 PM	Lyceum of the Philippines University	25	16	20	25	16	Syvie Gay Artates
12 PM	Far Eastern University	17	25	25	20	14	Marigail Tolentino
2 PM	Adamson University	30	21	25	25	16	Rissa Jane Laguilles
2 PM	Ateneo de Manila University	32	25	16	21	14	Ma. Carmina Denise Acevedo
TIME	APRIL 22 - THE ARENA, SAN JUAN						
TIME	Team	1st	2nd	3rd	4th	5th	Best Player
2 PM	Ateneo de Manila University	19	25	25	23	12	Ma. Rosario Soriano
2 PM	Far Eastern University	25	18	22	25	15	Macaila Irish May Morada
4 PM	Lyceum of the Philippines University	28	16	19	23	-	Syvie Gay Artates
4 PM	Adamson University	26	25	25	25	-	Angela Benting
TIME	APRIL 25 - THE ARENA, SAN JUAN						
TIME	Team	1st	2nd	3rd	4th	5th	Best Player
2 PM	Far Eastern University	25	25	25	-	-	Cherry May Vivas
2 PM	College of Saint Benilde	11	17	19	-	-	Cindy Velasquez
4 PM	San Sebastian College - Recoletos	25	25	26	-	-	Rysabelle Devenadera
4 PM	Ateneo de Manila University	15	21	24	-	-	Ma. Rosario Soriano
TIME	APRIL 27 - THE ARENA, SAN JUAN						
TIME	Team	1st	2nd	3rd	4th	5th	Best Player
2 PM	Lyceum of the Philippines University	14	17	25	-	-	Beverly Boto
2 PM	San Sebastian College - Recoletos	25	25	27	-	-	Jinni Mondejar
4 PM	Ateneo de Manila University	17	25	25	25	-	Ma. Rosario Soriano
4 PM	College of Saint Benilde	25	10	12	23	-	Doreen Sanchez
TIME	APRIL 29 - THE ARENA, SAN JUAN						
TIME	Team	1st	2nd	3rd	4th	5th	Best Player
2 PM	Adamson University	25	25	25	-	-	Michelle Segodine
2 PM	College of Saint Benilde	21	20	22	-	-	Cindy Velasquez
4 PM	Ateneo de Manila University	25	18	14	25	12	Ma. Rosario Soriano
4 PM	Lyceum of the Philippines University	22	25	25	19	15	Beverly Boto
TIME	MAY 02 - THE ARENA, SAN JUAN						
TIME	Team	1st	2nd	3rd	4th	5th	Best Player
2 PM	College of Saint Benilde	22	17	13	-	-	Giza Yumang
2 PM	Lyceum of the Philippines University	25	25	25	-	-	Mary Grace Babalo
4 PM	San Sebastian College - Recoletos	25	25	25	-	-	Laurence Ann Latigay
4 PM	Adamson University	22	19	16	-	-	Nerissa Bautista
END OF ELIMINATIONS

Legend: WD = Won by Default, LD = Lost by Default

== Quarterfinals Standing ==
QUALIFIED FOR SEMIS	ELIMINATED

Rank	Team	Win	Loss	Sets Won	Sets Lost	Percentage
1	Ateneo de Manila University	5	0	15	2	88%
2	Lyceum of the Philippines University	4	1	12	5	71%
3	University of Saint La Salle	2	3	9	10	47%
4	University of San Jose - Recoletos	2	3	9	11	45%
5	Far Eastern University	1	4	6	14	30%
6	College of Saint Benilde	1	4	3	12	20%

== Quarterfinals ==
START OF QUARTERFINALS
TIME	MAY 04 - THE ARENA, SAN JUAN						
TIME	Team	1st	2nd	3rd	4th	5th	Best Player
12 PM	Ateneo de Manila University	25	25	25	-	-	Karla Bello
12 PM	Lyceum of the Philippines University	16	21	20	-	-	Beverly Boto
2 PM	University of San Jose - Recoletos	25	25	25	-	-	Mechel Matuguina
2 PM	College of Saint Benilde	22	20	23	-	-	Katty Kwan
TIME	MAY 06 - THE ARENA, SAN JUAN						
TIME	Team	1st	2nd	3rd	4th	5th	Best Player
12 PM	College of Saint Benilde	12	9	17	-	-	Thelma Barrina-Rojas
12 PM	Ateneo de Manila University	25	25	25	-	-	Ma. Carmina Denise Acevedo
2 PM	Lyceum of the Philippines University	26	25	25	25	-	Beverly Boto
2 PM	University of San Jose - Recoletos	24	27	17	13	-	Genie Sabas
4 PM	University of Saint La Salle	16	25	25	10	6	Love Rich Jade Aplasca
4 PM	Far Eastern University	25	23	23	25	15	Cherry May Vivas
TIME	MAY 09 - THE ARENA, SAN JUAN						
TIME	Team	1st	2nd	3rd	4th	5th	Best Player
2 PM	Far Eastern University	25	21	24	-	-	Shaira Gonzalez
2 PM	Lyceum of the Philippines University	27	25	26	-	-	Dahlia Cruz
4 PM	Ateneo de Manila University	25	25	25	-	-	Patricia Lynn Taganas
4 PM	University of Saint La Salle	19	11	13	-	-	Kay Aplasca
TIME	MAY 11 - THE ARENA, SAN JUAN						
TIME	Team	1st	2nd	3rd	4th	5th	Best Player
12 PM	University of Saint La Salle	25	25	25	-	-	Kay Aplasca
12 PM	College of Saint Benilde	22	18	16	-	-	Giza Yumang
2 PM	University of San Jose - Recoletos	20	25	24	25	15	Michelle Anne Simbajon
2 PM	Far Eastern University	25	15	26	17	10	Cherry May Vivas
TIME	MAY 13 - THE ARENA, SAN JUAN						
TIME	Team	1st	2nd	3rd	4th	5th	Best Player
2 PM	Lyceum of the Philippines University	25	25	31	-	-	Jane Kathleen Jarin
2 PM	College of Saint Benilde	22	19	29	-	-	Giza Yumang
4 PM	Far Eastern University	25	15	14	22	-	Cherry May Vivas
4 PM	Ateneo de Manila University	19	25	25	25	-	Patricia Lynn Taganas
TIME	MAY 16 - THE ARENA, SAN JUAN						
TIME	Team	1st	2nd	3rd	4th	5th	Best Player
2 PM	University of Saint La Salle	16	25	23	10		Kay Aplasca
2 PM	Lyceum of the Philippines University	25	19	25	25		Dahlia Cruz
4 PM	Ateneo de Manila University	25	23	25	25		Ma. Rosario Soriano
4 PM	University of San Jose - Recoletos	21	25	21	13		Gwendolyn Gutang
TIME	MAY 18 - THE ARENA, SAN JUAN						
TIME	Team	1st	2nd	3rd	4th	5th	Best Player
2 PM	College of Saint Benilde	25	25	25	-	-	Anna Katrina Maranan
2 PM	Far Eastern University	20	17	16	-	-	Macaila Irish May Morada
4 PM	University of San Jose - Recoletos	23	25	11	13	-	Genie Sabas
4 PM	University of Saint La Salle	25	23	25	25	-	Patty Orendain
END OF QUARTERFINALS

== Semifinals Standing ==
QUALIFIED FOR FINALS

Rank	Team	Win	Loss	Sets Won	Sets Lost	Percentage
1	Adamson University	2	1	7	5	58%
2	Ateneo de Manila University	2	1	7	7	50%
3	San Sebastian College - Recoletos	1	2	6	6	50%
4	Lyceum of the Philippines University	1	2	5	7	42%

== Semifinals ==
START OF SEMIFINALS
TIME	MAY 20 - THE ARENA, SAN JUAN						
TIME	Team	1st	2nd	3rd	4th	5th	Best Player
2 PM	San Sebastian College - Recoletos	25	25	25	-	-	Charisse Vernon Ancheta
2 PM	Lyceum of the Philippines University	16	19	16	-	-	Bernadette Satsatin
4 PM	Adamson University	25	20	25	25	-	Nerissa Bautista
4 PM	Ateneo de Manila University	16	25	22	21	-	Ma. Carmina Denise Acevedo
TIME	MAY 23 - THE ARENA, SAN JUAN						
TIME	Team	1st	2nd	3rd	4th	5th	Best Player
2 PM	Lyceum of the Philippines University	25	25	18	25	-	Dahlia Cruz
2 PM	Adamson University	23	22	25	22	-	Nerissa Bautista
4 PM	Ateneo de Manila University	14	25	22	25	15	Ma. Carmina Denise Acevedo
4 PM	San Sebastian College - Recoletos	25	19	25	22	13	Jinni Mondejar
TIME	MAY 25 - THE ARENA, SAN JUAN						
TIME	Team	1st	2nd	3rd	4th	5th	Best Player
12 PM	Ateneo de Manila University	18	20	27	25	15	Ma. Carmina Denise Acevedo
12 PM	Lyceum of the Philippines University	25	25	25	20	9	Beverly Boto
2 PM	San Sebastian College - Recoletos	17	19	25	21	-	Jinni Mondejar
2 PM	Adamson University	25	25	21	25	-	Nerissa Bautista
END OF SEMIFINALS

== Battle for First Standing ==
CHAMPION	FIRST RUNNER-UP

Team	Win	Loss	Sets Won	Sets Lost	Percentage
Adamson University	2	0	6	1	86%
Ateneo de Manila University	0	2	1	6	14%

== Battle for Third Standing ==
SECOND RUNNER-UP	THIRD RUNNER-UP

Team	Win	Loss	Sets Won	Sets Lost	Percentage
San Sebastian College - Recoletos	2	0	6	0	100%
Lyceum of the Philippines University	0	2	0	6	0%

== Finals ==
START OF FINALS
TIME	MAY 27 - THE ARENA, SAN JUAN						
TIME	Team	1st	2nd	3rd	4th	5th	Best Player
2 PM	San Sebastian College - Recoletos	25	27	25	-	-	Rysabelle Devanadera
2 PM	Lyceum of the Philippines University	17	25	23	-	-	Dahlia Cruz
4 PM	Adamson University	25	25	23	25		Nerissa Bautista
4 PM	Ateneo de Manila University	7	14	25	22		Karla Bello
TIME	MAY 30 - THE ARENA, SAN JUAN						
TIME	Team	1st	2nd	3rd	4th	5th	Best Player
2 PM	Lyceum of the Philippines University	18	14	17	-	-	Dahlia Cruz
2 PM	San Sebastian College - Recoletos	25	25	25	-	-	Rysabelle Devanadera
4 PM	Ateneo de Manila University	17	13	17	-	-	Ma. Rosario Soriano
4 PM	Adamson University	25	25	25	-	-	Michelle Segodine
END OF FINALS

== Conference Awardees ==
- Best scorer: 13 Beverly Boto - Lyceum of the Philippines University
- Best attacker: 7 Jaroensri Bualee (Guest Player) - San Sebastian College-Recolletos
- Best blocker: 8 Ma. Rosario Soriano - Ateneo de Manila University
- Best setter: 5 Janet Serafica - Adamson University
- Best digger: 6 Lizlee Ann Gata - Adamson University
- Best server: 8 Angela Benting - Adamson University
- Best receiver: 5 Mary Jane Pepito - San Sebastian College-Recolletos
- Most Improved Player: 8 Ma. Rosario Soriano - Ateneo de Manila University
- Finals MVP: 4 Rissa Jane Laguilles - Adamson University
- Conference MVP: 11 Nerissa Bautista (Guest Player) - Adamson University
