= 2014 Shakey's V-League 1st Conference =

Shakey's V-League 11th Season 1st Conference
Women's Finals	G1	G2	Wins
NU Lady Bulldogs	0	0	0
FEU Lady Tamaraws	3	3	2
- Duration: March 23, 2014 – May 25, 2014
- Arena(s): Filoil Flying V Arena, San Juan
- Finals MVP: Rachel Daquis
- Winning coach: Shaq delos Santos
- Semifinalists: Adamson Lady Falcons; UST Growling Tigresses
- TV network(s): GMA News TV (local); GMA Pinoy TV (international)

The 2014 Shakey's V-League 1st Conference was the 20th conference of the Shakey's V-League and the first conference of the 2014 season. The opening ceremonies was held on March 23, 2014, with the first doubleheader of volleyball games at the Filoil Flying V Arena in San Juan. There are 12 teams competing this including the join forces of all the top selected players from Davao in one team (called as Davao Lady Agilas) and the debut of St. Louis University of Baguio. Also, the return of Arellano, Adamson, Ateneo, FEU, San Sebastian, CSB, NU, Perpetual, SWU, and UST. This is league's first time to have 12 participating schools to battle for the championship, and first to have a school representing Mindanao region.

== Tournament Format ==
=== Preliminaries (PL) ===
- Twelve (12) participating teams will be divided into two (2) PL groups- Pool A & Pool B.
- Each pool will play a single round robin.
- The TOP 4 TEAMS PER POOL (or a total of eight (8) teams) will advance to the Quarterfinal Round.
- The bottom two (2) per group will be eliminated from the tournament.

=== Quarterfinals (QF) ===
- The eight (8) quarter finalists will be regrouped into two (2) new QF Pools- Pool C & Pool D.
  - Pool C will be composed of Pool A seed #1 (A1) and seed #3 (A3) and Pool B seed #1 (B1) and seed #3 (B3).
  - Pool D will be composed of Pool A seed #2 (A2) and seed #4 (A4) and Pool B seed #2 (B2) and seed #4 (B4).
- Each QF Pools will play a single round robin, provided that matches will no longer be played between the teams from the same PL Pool.
- For the teams belonging to the same PL pool, their prelims match result will be carried over into the QF. (e.g. if A1 def. A3, 3-0 set in the PL then it will be as if A1 def. A3, 3-0 set in the QF. without a match occurring between them.)
- The TOP TWO (2) TEAMS PER POOL (a total of four (4) teams) will advance to the Semi-final Round.
- The bottom two (2) per group will be eliminated from the tournament.

=== Semi-finals ===
- The four (4) semi-finalists will compete against each other in a best-of-three series as follows: C1 vs D2 and D1 vs C2.
- The two (2) SF winners will compete for GOLD.
- The two (2) SF losers will compete for BRONZE.

=== Finals ===
- The battle for GOLD and the battle for BRONZE will both follow the best-of-three format, provided:
  - If the battle for GOLD ends in two (2) matches (2-0), then there will no longer be Game 3 for either GOLD or BRONZE.
  - If, in the case, the series for BRONZE is tied (1-1), then the tie will be resolved using FIVB rules.
  - A tie in the series for GOLD (1-1) after Game 2 will be broken in a Game 3, regardless of the results of the series in BRONZE.

== Participants ==
The conference is composed of 12 teams, grouped into two pools, each consisting of six squads.

Participating teams
Pool A	Pool B
Adamson University; Lady Falcons	Davao All-Stars Lady Agilas (composed selection of top collegiate players from different schools in Davao region)
Ateneo de Manila University; Lady Eagles	Far Eastern University; Lady Tamaraws
Arellano University; Lady Chiefs	National University; Lady Bulldogs
De La Salle-College of St. Benilde; Lady Blazers	San Sebastian College–Recoletos; Lady Stags
St. Louis University; Lady Navigators	University of Perpetual Help System DALTA; Lady Altas
Southwestern University; Lady Cobras	University of Santo Tomas; Tigresses

== Season's Line-ups (Regular Players) ==
=== Pool A ===
ADAMSON LADY FALCONS
No.	Player name	Position
1	PINEDA, Shiela Marie	OH
4	PAAT, Mylene	MH
5	ZAPANTA, Luisa Mae	OH
6	VILLANUEVA, Amanda Maria	OP
7	TEMPIATURA, Jellie	L
8	EMNAS, Fenela Risha	S
11	LISTANA, Princess Aimee	L
12	GALANZA, Jessica Margarett	OH
14	MACATUNO, May Jennifer	S
15	CORTEL, Marleen (c)	OP
16	LEBUMFACIL, Keith Dempoll	S
17	ALKUINO, Maria Erika Gel	MH

ARELLANO LADY CHIEFS
No.	Player name	Position
2	IBISA, Jonalyn	L
4	SAGUN, Elaine	
5	TICAR, Mary Jane	
8	TUBIERA, Menchie	
9	GALANG, Jan Eunice	L
10	PRADO, Jovielyn	
11	CARINO, Nikka	
12	OSERO, Lexyl Lov (c)	
14	HENSON, Danna	
15	LEGACION, Angelica	
16	SALAMAGOS, Shirley	
17	ROSARIO, Cristine Joy	

ATENEO LADY EAGLES
No.	Player name	Position
1	PATNONGON, Aerieal	MH
2	VALDEZ, Alyssa (c)	OH
3	MORENTE, Michelle Kathleen	OP
5	TAJIMA, Mary Mae	MH
7	TAN, Maria Gizelle Jessica	S
8	DE JESUS, Jorella Marie	OH
10	TEJADA, Margarita Anna Marie	MH
11	FAUSTINO, Natasha Graciela	S
12	MORADO, Julia Melissa	S
13	LAZARO, Dennise Michelle	L
16	AHOMIRO, Rongomaipapa Amy	MH
18	GEQUILLANA, Kassandra Miren	OP

BENILDE LADY BLAZERS
No.	Player name	Position
1	NAVARRO, Janine	
2	CHENG, Djanel Welch	
3	GEQUILLANA, Camille	
4	JIMENEZ, Patricia	
5	VERONAS, Therese (c)	
6	PANAGA, Jennette	
8	BORRERO, Jane Frances	
10	ENCLONA, Rica Jane	L
11	RAMOS, Kim Alnette	
12	Loren, Maureen	
13	MANGANSAKAN, Bianca	
14	LAI, Janica	
17	MUSA, Ranya	

SLU LADY NAVIGATORS
No.	Player name	Position
1	MADULID, Florence	
2	QUEZADA, Laarni	L
3	ALMONTE, Roxanne	
4	AGUDIA, Maureen	
5	BANJAWAN, Sunshine	
7	MEJLA, Czarina	L
8	DANIEL, Elaine Joy	
9	TORRES, Marian (c)	
11	ROSSI, Coleen	
12	GANI, Eileen	
13	TSUCHIYA, Krissian	
14	AQUINO, Allysa	
18	GERONIMO, Loraine	
19	JOSEPH, Tamiya Dawn	

SOUTHWESTERN LADY COBRAS
No.	Player name	Position
1	CABAHUG, Janelle	
5	RAMAS, Therese Rae	
6	ABELLANA, Loida	
8	QUINO, Sheena	
9	DELA LLANA, Necca Rose	
10	PACINO, Jera Mae	L
12	BONGO, Sheila Mae	
13	VILLANUEVA, Neresa (c)	
17	DARANTINAO, Dyan	
18	LLAGOSO, Marlyn	

=== Pool B ===
DAVAO SELECTION LADY AGILAS
No.	Player name	Position
1	AGTON, May Sheila	OH
3	ENTIQUEZ, Ma. Aurora	
4	DIGNADICE, Irish	L
5	CONCEPTION, Ana Veronica	S
6	OLIVEROS, Princess Joy	OH
7	TAPIC, Jocemer	MH
8	BERTE, Mary Grace	
10	RATERTA, Reynelen	S
12	DAWANG, Kween Marie Claire	
14	ANTIPUESTO, Angel Mae	MH
15	BALSE, Cherry Ann	U
18	FLORES, Venus (c)	U

FEU LADY TAMARAWS
No.	Player name	Position
1	AGNO, Christine	L
2	PONS, Bernadeth	OH
3	SIMBORIO, Marie Charlemagne	OH
5	TORRES, Glayssa Faith	MH
6	DIONELA, Joannabelle	OH
7	CASUGOD, Geneveve	MH
8	DAWSON, Samantha Chloe	OP
9	PALMA, Mary Remy Joy	MH
10	PAPA, Yna Louise (c)	S
11	ATIENZA, Kyla Llana	L
13	ROXAS, Mayjorie	OP
14	AMARO, Rizalie	MH

NU LADY BULLDOGS
No.	Player name	Position
1	VALDEZ, Gayle Rose	OH
2	PEREZ, Ivy Jisel	S
3	SANTIAGO, Alyja Daphne	MH
4	AGANON, Carmina	OH
5	GENERAL, Fatima Bia	L
6	SALIBAD, Precious May	S
7	MANDAPAT, Rizza Jane	OH
8	SALAZAR, Jarene Mae	L
9	URDAS, Aiko Sweet	OP
10	SOLIVEN, Jocelyn	S
12	DADANG, Siemens Desiree	MH
16	SANTIAGO, Aleona Denise (c)	MH
17	PABLO, Myla	OH

SAN SEBASTIAN LADY STAGS
No.	Player name	Position
1	ARABE, Nikka	OH
2	CRISOSTOMO, Trisha	S
4	CORPUZ, Jona	OH
5	SOLTONES, Gretchel (c)	U
6	BERBANO, Czarina	U
8	CRISOSTOMO, Mae	L
9	MALLARE, Maria Ara	MH
10	LIM, Denice Franchesca	OH
11	UY, Bea Camille	MH
12	VILLEGAS, Katherine	MH
13	LABIANO, Jolina	OH
16	EROA, Alyssa	L

PERPETUAL LADY ALTAS
No.	Player name	Position
1	CONDADA, Vhima	L
2	CALLEJA, Joy	L
3	BRAVO, Coleen	MH
4	SUYAT, Jamela	OH
5	DIAZ, Norie Jane	U
7	DIOCAREZA, Ana James	OP
8	CABRIANA, Shaira	S
9	BERBA, Zarina	U
11	MEDALLA, Marijo	U
12	ABCEDE, Wendy	OH
13	CHING, Joy	OH
14	STA. MARIA, Jana	OH
15	TUBINO, Honey Royse (c)	U

UST TIGRESSES
No.	Player name	Position
3	CORTEZ, Chlodia Eiriel	OH
5	GUTIERREZ, Jem Nicole	OH
6	LASTIMOSA, Pamela Tricia (c)	OH
7	SANTOS, Patricia Mae	OH
8	TUNAY, Maria Carmela	OP
10	CABANOS, Alexine Danielle	S
11	RASMO, Patrisha	L
12	DUSARAN, Dancel Jan	L
14	LANTIN, Maria Loren	OP
15	DE LEON, Jessey Laine	MH
17	PALEC, Shannen	MH
18	MENESES, Marivic Velaine	MH

Legend
S	Setter
MH	Middle hitter
OH	Outside hitter
OP	Opposite hitter
L	Libero
(c)	Team captain
GP	Guest Player

== List of Guest Players ==
Team - Guest Players
Pool A	Pool B
Adamson 2 Paulina Soriano; 13 Patcharee Sangmuang	Davao 5 Ana Veronica Conception; 15 Cherry Ann Balse
Ateneo 14 Bea de Leon; 6 Rissa Sato * 15 Jhoana Maraguinot	FEU 15 Jerrily Malabanan * 16 Toni Rose Basas * 18 Rachel Daquis; 20 Jovelyn Gonzaga
Arellano 1 Ronerry dela Cruz; 18 Eleonor Sierra	National 14 Rubie de Leon + 11 Jen Reyes ^
Benilde 16 Michelle Datuin; 18 Iumi Yongco	San Sebastian 18 Maruja Banaticla; 3 Rysabelle Devanadera
St. Louis None	Perpetual 18 Ma. Abigail Praca; 16 Shallane Eniong
Southwestern 7 Karen Derder; 17 Lutgarda Malaluan	Santo Tomas 1 Rhea Dimaculangan; 9 Ennajie Laure

* replaced
+ invited at the middle of elimination rounds
^ invited before the start of the semifinals

== Eliminations ==
=== Pool A ===
Pos	Team	Pld	W	L	Pts	SW	SL	SR	SPW	SPL	SPR	Qualification
1	Ateneo Lady Eagles	5	4	1	13	14	4	3.500	418	346	1.208	Quarterfinals
2	Arellano Lady Chiefs	5	4	1	12	14	5	2.800	423	343	1.233	Quarterfinals
3	Adamson Lady Falcons	5	4	1	11	13	5	2.600	424	324	1.309	Quarterfinals
4	Benilde Lady Blazers	5	2	3	5	6	11	0.545	337	379	0.889	Quarterfinals
5	SWU Lady Cobras	5	1	4	3	5	14	0.357	362	430	0.842	Eliminated
6	SLU Lady Navigators	5	0	5	1	2	12	0.167	271	413	0.656	Eliminated

==== Game Results ====
Date		Score		Set 1	Set 2	Set 3	Set 4	Set 5	Total
03-23-14	Ateneo Lady Eagles	3 - 1	Adamson Lady Falcons	25 - 19	18 - 25	25 - 23	26 - 24	-	94 - 90
03-25-14	SWU Lady Cobras	3 - 2	SLU Lady Navigators	25 - 20	23 - 25	25 - 15	21 - 25	19 - 17	113 - 102
03-27-14	Arellano Lady Chiefs	3 - 0	SWU Lady Cobras	25 - 16	25 - 16	25 - 19	-	-	75 - 51
03-27-14	SLU Lady Navigators	0 - 3	Adamson Lady Falcons	10 - 25	10 - 25	20 - 25	-	-	40 - 75
03-30-14	Ateneo Lady Eagles	2 - 3	Arellano Lady Chiefs	25 - 21	16 - 25	25 - 17	20 - 25	13 - 15	99 - 103
04-01-14	SWU Lady Cobras	2 - 3	Benilde Lady Blazers	23 - 25	23 - 25	25 - 15	25 - 23	9 - 15	105 - 103
04-03-14	Adamson Lady Falcons	3 - 0	SWU Lady Cobras	25 - 12	25 - 14	25 - 16	-	-	75 - 42
04-03-14	Benilde Lady Blazers	0 - 3	Arellano Lady Chiefs	19 - 25	17 - 25	16 - 25	-	-	52 - 75
04-06-14	SWU Lady Cobras	0 - 3	Ateneo Lady Eagles	13 - 25	18 - 25	20 - 25	-	-	51 - 75
04-08-14	Arellano Lady Chiefs	3 - 0	SLU Lady Navigators	25 - 13	25 - 9	25 - 13	-	-	75 - 35
04-10-14	Adamson Lady Falcons	3 - 2	Arellano Lady Chiefs	17 - 25	24 - 26	25 - 14	25 - 19	15 - 11	106 - 95
04-20-14	Benilde Lady Blazers	0 - 3	Ateneo Lady Eagles	15 - 25	19 - 25	20 - 25	-	-	54 - 75
04-22-14	SLU Lady Navigators	0 - 3	Benilde Lady Blazers	13 - 25	14 - 25	20 - 25	-	-	47 - 75
04-24-14	Ateneo Lady Eagles	3 - 0	SLU Lady Navigators	25 - 16	25 - 18	25 - 13	-	-	75 - 47
04-27-14	Adamson Lady Falcons	3 - 0	Benilde Lady Blazers	25 - 9	25 - 19	27 - 25	-	-	77 - 53

=== Pool B ===
Pos	Team	Pld	W	L	Pts	SW	SL	SR	SPW	SPL	SPR	Qualification
1	UST Growling Tigresses	5	4	1	12	14	6	2.333	464	302	1.536	Quarterfinals
2	NU Lady Bulldogs	5	4	1	11	11	5	2.200	435	364	1.195	Quarterfinals
3	Davao Lady Agilas	5	4	1	11	13	7	1.857	466	454	1.026	Quarterfinals
4	FEU Lady Tamaraws	5	2	3	6	8	11	0.727	411	423	0.972	Quarterfinals
5	San Sebastian Lady Stags	5	1	4	2	5	17	0.294	373	446	0.836	Eliminated
6	Perpetual Lady Altas	5	0	5	2	5	15	0.333	390	469	0.832	Eliminated

==== Game Results ====
Date		Score		Set 1	Set 2	Set 3	Set 4	Set 5	Total
03-23-14	NU Lady Bulldogs	3 - 0	Perpetual Lady Altas	25 - 20	25 - 14	25 - 15	-	-	75 - 49
03-25-14	FEU Lady Tamaraws	3 - 1	San Sebastian Lady Stags	25 - 21	20 - 25	25 - 11	25 - 20	-	95 - 77
03-30-14	NU Lady Bulldogs	3 - 2	UST Growling Tigresses	25 - 19	25 - 22	18 - 25	24 - 26	15 - 10	107 - 102
04-01-14	Perpetual Lady Altas	2 - 3	San Sebastian Lady Stags	18 - 25	25 - 17	25 - 27	25 - 23	12 - 15	106 - 107
04-06-14	UST Growling Tigresses	3 - 1	FEU Lady Tamaraws	25 - 15	19 - 25	25 - 18	25 - 13	-	94 - 71
04-08-14	San Sebastian Lady Stags	0 - 3	NU Lady Bulldogs	16 - 25	19 - 25	16 - 25	-	-	51 - 75
04-10-14	NU Lady Bulldogs	3 - 0	FEU Lady Tamaraws	25 - 19	25 - 23	25 - 19	-	-	75 - 61
04-13-14	Perpetual Lady Altas	1 - 3	FEU Lady Tamaraws	25 - 23	18 - 25	18 - 25	21 - 25	-	82 - 98
04-13-14	UST Growling Tigresses	3 - 1	San Sebastian Lady Stags	25 - 16	20 - 25	25 - 14	25 - 20	-	95 - 75
04-20-14	FEU Lady Tamaraws	1 - 3	Davao Lady Agilas	20 - 25	19 - 25	25 - 20	22 - 25	-	86 - 95
04-22-14	Davao Lady Agilas	3 - 2	Perpetual Lady Altas	23 - 25	24 - 26	25 - 18	25 - 20	17 - 15	114 - 104
04-24-14	NU Lady Bulldogs	1 - 3	Davao Lady Agilas	20 - 25	28 - 30	25 - 14	30 - 32	-	103 - 101
04-27-14	Davao Lady Agilas	1 - 3	UST Growling Tigresses	25 - 23	22 - 25	19 - 25	17 - 25	-	83 - 98
04-29-14	San Sebastian Lady Stags	0 - 3	Davao Lady Agilas	18 - 25	22 - 25	23 - 25	-	-	63 - 75
04-13-14	UST Growling Tigresses	3 - 0	Perpetual Lady Altas	25 - 15	25 - 17	25 - 17	-	-	75 - 49

== Quarterfinals ==
=== Pool C ===
Pos	Team	Pld	W	L	Pts	SW	SL	SR	SPW	SPL	SPR	Qualification
1	Adamson Lady Falcons	3	2	1	6	7	4	1.750	266	236	1.127	Semifinals
2	UST Growling Tigresses	3	2	1	6	7	4	1.750	263	243	1.082	Semifinals
3	Ateneo Lady Eagles	3	1	2	4	5	7	0.714	259	281	0.922	Eliminated
4	Davao Lady Agilas	3	1	2	2	4	8	0.500	252	278	0.906	Eliminated

==== Game Results ====
Date		Score		Set 1	Set 2	Set 3	Set 4	Set 5	Total
03-23-14	Ateneo Lady Eagles	3 - 1	Adamson Lady Falcons	25 - 19	18 - 25	25 - 23	26 - 24	-	94 - 90
04-27-14	Davao Lady Agilas	1 - 3	UST Growling Tigresses	25 - 23	22 - 25	19 - 25	17 - 25	-	83 - 98
05-01-14	Davao Lady Agilas	3 - 2	Ateneo Lady Eagles	22 - 25	25 - 18	25 - 27	25 - 18	19 - 17	116 - 105
05-04-14	Ateneo Lady Eagles	0 - 3	UST Growling Tigresses	19 - 25	22 - 25	19 - 25	-	-	60 - 75
05-06-14	Adamson Lady Falcons	3 - 0	Davao Lady Agilas	25 - 15	25 - 23	25 - 15	-	-	75 - 53
05-08-14	UST Growling Tigresses	1 - 3	Adamson Lady Falcons	18 - 25	23 - 25	27 - 25	22 - 25	-	90 - 100

=== Pool D ===
Pos	Team	Pld	W	L	Pts	SW	SL	SR	SPW	SPL	SPR	Qualification
1	NU Lady Bulldogs	3	3	0	9	9	0	MAX	225	144	1.563	Semifinals
2	FEU Lady Tamaraws	3	2	1	6	6	4	1.500	235	201	1.169	Semifinals
3	Arellano Lady Chiefs	3	1	2	3	3	6	0.500	189	226	0.836	Eliminated
4	Benilde Lady Blazers	3	0	3	0	0	9	0.000	147	225	0.653	Eliminated

==== Game Results ====
Date		Score		Set 1	Set 2	Set 3	Set 4	Set 5	Total
04-03-14	Benilde Lady Blazers	0 - 3	Arellano Lady Chiefs	19 - 25	17 - 25	16 - 25	-	-	52 - 75
04-10-14	NU Lady Bulldogs	3 - 0	FEU Lady Tamaraws	25 - 19	25 - 23	25 - 19	-	-	75 - 61
05-01-14	Arellano Lady Chiefs	0 - 3	NU Lady Bulldogs	09 - 25	14 - 25	18 - 25	-	-	41 - 75
05-04-14	Benilde Lady Blazers	0 - 3	FEU Lady Tamaraws	18 - 25	18 - 25	17 - 25	-	-	53 - 75
05-06-14	FEU Lady Tamaraws	3 - 1	Arellano Lady Chiefs	25 - 16	25 - 15	24 - 26	25 - 16	-	99 - 73
05-08-14	NU Lady Bulldogs	3 - 0	Benilde Lady Blazers	25 - 11	25 - 14	25 - 17	-	-	75 - 42

== Bracket ==
* All places are determined by best-of-3 series.

Semi-finals
NU	2
UST	0
Adamson	1
FEU	2

Final
NU	0
FEU	2
Third place
UST	0
Adamson	2

== Semifinals ==
=== NU vs. UST ===
May 11; 04:00 PM (UTC+08:00)	NU Lady Bulldogs	3–1	UST Growling Tigresses	Filoil Flying V Arena, San Juan; Attendance: 3,184; Referees: TABANAG Adrian(IR) & SISON Philip (NR)
May 11; 04:00 PM (UTC+08:00)	(25–20, 25–23, 22–25, 25–22); Report			Filoil Flying V Arena, San Juan; Attendance: 3,184; Referees: TABANAG Adrian(IR) & SISON Philip (NR)

May 13; 02:00 PM (UTC+08:00)	UST Growling Tigresses	0–3	NU Lady Bulldogs	Filoil Flying V Arena, San Juan; Attendance: 626; Referees: ROJAS Rodrigo (IR) & GAA Efren (NR)
May 13; 02:00 PM (UTC+08:00)	(21–25, 22–25, 19–25); Report			Filoil Flying V Arena, San Juan; Attendance: 626; Referees: ROJAS Rodrigo (IR) & GAA Efren (NR)

=== Adamson vs. FEU ===
May 11; 02:00 PM (UTC+08:00)	Adamson Lady Falcons	3–2	FEU Lady Tamaraws	Filoil Flying V Arena, San Juan; Attendance: 2,645; Referees: GAA Efren (IR) & PAJARILLO Lumer (NR)
May 11; 02:00 PM (UTC+08:00)	(19–25, 22–25, 26–24, 25–15, 15–12); Report			Filoil Flying V Arena, San Juan; Attendance: 2,645; Referees: GAA Efren (IR) & PAJARILLO Lumer (NR)

May 13; 04:00 PM (UTC+08:00)	FEU Lady Tamaraws	3–0	Adamson Lady Falcons	Filoil Flying V Arena, San Juan; Attendance: 651; Referees: PAJARILLO Lumer (NR) & BENITO Liberato (IR)
May 13; 04:00 PM (UTC+08:00)	(25–22, 25–23, 26–24); Report			Filoil Flying V Arena, San Juan; Attendance: 651; Referees: PAJARILLO Lumer (NR) & BENITO Liberato (IR)

May 15; 04:00 PM (UTC+08:00)	Adamson Lady Falcons	1–3	FEU Lady Tamaraws	Filoil Flying V Arena, San Juan; Attendance: 781; Referees: BENITO Liberato (IR) & GAA Efren (IR)
May 15; 04:00 PM (UTC+08:00)	(22–25, 22–25, 25–22, 22–25); Report			Filoil Flying V Arena, San Juan; Attendance: 781; Referees: BENITO Liberato (IR) & GAA Efren (IR)

== Finals ==
=== Battle for Bronze ===
May 18; 02:00 PM (UTC+08:00)	UST Growling Tigresses	1–3	Adamson Lady Falcons	Filoil Flying V Arena, San Juan; Attendance: 3,281; Referees: SISON Philip (IR) & PAJARILLO Lumer (NR)
May 18; 02:00 PM (UTC+08:00)	(17–25, 23–25, 25–18, 19–25); Report			Filoil Flying V Arena, San Juan; Attendance: 3,281; Referees: SISON Philip (IR) & PAJARILLO Lumer (NR)

May 25; 12:30 PM (UTC+08:00)	Adamson Lady Falcons	3–0	UST Growling Tigresses	Filoil Flying V Arena, San Juan; Attendance: 2,542; Referees: PAJARILLO Lumer (NR) & TABANAG Adrian (IR)
May 25; 12:30 PM (UTC+08:00)	(25–15, 25–17, 25–22); Report			Filoil Flying V Arena, San Juan; Attendance: 2,542; Referees: PAJARILLO Lumer (NR) & TABANAG Adrian (IR)

=== Battle for Gold ===
May 18; 04:00 PM (UTC+08:00)	NU Lady Bulldogs	0–3	FEU Lady Tamaraws	Filoil Flying V Arena, San Juan; Attendance: 3,952; Referees: GAA Efren (IR) & TABANAG Adrian (IR)
May 18; 04:00 PM (UTC+08:00)	(24–26, 24–26, 22–25); Report			Filoil Flying V Arena, San Juan; Attendance: 3,952; Referees: GAA Efren (IR) & TABANAG Adrian (IR)

May 25; 02:30 PM (UTC+08:00)	FEU Lady Tamaraws	3–0	NU Lady Bulldogs	Filoil Flying V Arena, San Juan; Attendance: 3,896; Referees: SISON Philip (IR) & GAA Efren (IR)
May 25; 02:30 PM (UTC+08:00)	(25–21, 25–23, 25–18); Report			Filoil Flying V Arena, San Juan; Attendance: 3,896; Referees: SISON Philip (IR) & GAA Efren (IR)

== Final standings ==
Rank	Team
1st place, gold medalist(s)	FEU Lady Tamaraws
2nd place, silver medalist(s)	NU Lady Bulldogs
3rd place, bronze medalist(s)	Adamson Lady Falcons
4	UST Growling Tigresses
5	Ateneo Lady Eagles
6	Davao Lady Agilas
7	Arellano Lady Chiefs
8	Benilde Lady Blazers
9	SWU Lady Cobras
10	San Sebastian Lady Stags
11	Perpetual Lady Altas
12	SLU Lady Navigators

Shakey's V-League 11th Season 1st Conference Champions

Team roster
1. AGNO, Christine (Libero)
2. PONS, Bernadette
3. SIMBORIO, Marie Charlemagne
5. TORRES, Glyssa Faith
6. DIONELA, Joannabelle
7. CASUGOD, Genevieve
8. DAWSON, Samantha
9. PALMA, Mary Remy Joy
10. PAPA, Yna Louise (Team Captain)
11. ATIENZA, Kyla Llana (Libero)
14. AMARO, Rizalie
18. DAQUIS, Rachel Anne (Guest Player)
20. GONZAGA, Jovelyn (Guest Player)

Head coach
Cesael Delos Santos

== Individual awards ==
- Season's Most Valuable Player: (C) Dindin Santiago ( NU)
- Most Improved Player: Shiela Marie Pineda ( Adamson)
- Best scorer: (G) Ennajie Laure ( UST)
- Best attacker:(G) Ma. Paulina Soriano ( Adamson)
- Best blocker: Marivic Velaine Meneses ( UST)
- Best server: (C) Dindin Santiago ( NU)
- Best digger: (L) Dansel Jan Dusaran ( UST)
- Best setter: (C) Yna Louise Papa ( FEU)
- Best receiver: (L) Christine Agno ( FEU)
- Final's Most Valuable Player: (G) Rachel Daquis ( FEU)

Note
(G) - Guest Player
(C) - Team Captain
(L) - Libero
