= 2010 Shakey's V-League 2nd Conference =

Tournament structure of the 2nd Conference in the 7th season of V-League

Shakey's V-League 7th Season
Women's Finals	G1	G2	G3	Wins
Adamson Lady Falcons	3	1	3	2
San Sebastian Lady Stags	2	3	0	1
- Duration: July 11, 2010-September 23, 2010
- Arena(s): Filoil Flying V Arena
- Finals MVP: Nerissa Bautista
- Semifinalists: Lyceum Lady Pirates; FEU Lady Tamaraws
- TV network(s): NBN

The 2010 Shakey's V-League 2nd Conference was the 12th conference of the Shakey's V-League and the second conference of the 2010 season. It was held from July 11, 2010, to late September at the Filoil Flying V Arena. Second Conference shall be governed by the FIVB Official Volleyball Rules.

3-time champions University of Santo Tomas Tigresses refused to defend their crown and it paved the way for the entry of two new schools, National University and University of Perpetual Help System Dalta. San Sebastian College, Far Eastern University, and Lyceum of the Philippines University maintain their perfect league attendance. Other participating teams include UAAP powerhouses Ateneo de Manila University and Adamson University and NCAA Runner-up College of Saint Benilde.

== Tournament format ==
- Preliminaries
  - The eight participating teams will play one round. The six teams with the best win–loss records, after the round, will qualify into the quarter-finals.
  - In the event of a two-way tie for 6th place, the tie will be resolved by a play-off game.
  - If three or more teams are tied for 6th place, FIVB Rules shall apply to determine the best two which will play-off to resolve the tie.
- Quarter-finals
  - The six qualified teams will play one round. With the win–loss records of the preliminaries carried over into the quarter-finals, the four teams with the best win–loss records, after the round, will qualify into the semi-finals.
  - In the event of a two-way tie for 4th place, the tie will be resolved by a play-off game.
  - If three or more teams are tied for 4th place, FIVB Rules shall apply to determine the best two which will play-off to resolve the tie.
- Semi-finals
  - A best-of-three series will be played between the 1st and 4th placed teams of the quarters.
  - A best-of-three series will be played between the 2nd and 3rd placed teams of the quarters.
- Finals
  - A best-of-three series will be played between the 2 winners of the semis for the gold.
  - A best-of-three series will be played between the 2 losers of the semis for the bronze.
  - If the gold medalist is determined in two games, the series for the bronze medal will also end in two games. If the contenders for the bronze are tied after two games, then FIVB Rules will determine the winner.

== Preliminaries ==
=== Team standings ===
Qualified for the quarterfinals
Qualified for sixth-seed playoff, but was eliminated
Eliminated

Team	W	L	PCT	GB	SW	SL	Avg
San Sebastian Lady Stags	6	1	.857	--	20	3	.870
Adamson Lady Falcons	5	2	.714	1	17	11	.607
Ateneo Lady Eagles	5	2	.714	1	16	12	.571
Lyceum Lady Pirates	4	3	.571	2	16	11	.593
FEU Lady Tamaraws	4	3	.571	2	12	13	.480
NU Lady Bulldogs	2	5	.286	4	7	17	.292
Perpetual Lady Altas	2	5	.286	4	8	18	.286
Benilde Lady Blazers	0	7	.000	5	6	21	.222

SW = sets won; SL = sets lost

=== Results ===
Team	AdU	ADMU	CSB	FEU	LPU	NU	SSC-R	UPHSD
Adamson		3-1	3-0	0-3	3-2	3-0	3-2	2–3
Ateneo			2-3	3-0	3-2	3-0	0-3	3–2
Benilde				0-3	0-3	2-3	0-3	1–3
FEU					1-3	3-0	0-3	3–0
Lyceum						3-1	0-3	3–0
NU							0-3	3–0
SSC-R								3–0

== Sixth-seed playoff ==
Date		Score		Set 1	Set 2	Set 3	Set 4	Set 5	Total
July	NU Lady Bulldogs	3 - 2	Perpetual Lady Altas	12 - 25	15 - 25	25 - 23	25 - 18	15 - 12	92 - 103

== Quarterfinals ==
=== Quarterfinal Standings ===
Qualified for the semifinals
Qualified for fourth-seed playoff but eliminated
Eliminated

Team	W	L	PCT	GB	SW	SL	Avg
Adamson Lady Falcons	5	0	MAX	--	15	3	.696
San Sebastian Lady Stags	4	1	4.000	1	14	5	.810
Lyceum Lady Pirates	3	2	1.500	2	10	8	.578
FEU Lady Tamaraws	2	3	0.667	3	8	8	.489
Ateneo Lady Eagles	1	4	0.250	3	6	13	.468
NU Lady Bulldogs	0	5	0.000	4	3	15	.238

=== Team Standings ===
Team	W	L	PCT	GB	SW	SL	Avg
San Sebastian Lady Stags	10	2	.833	--	34	8	.810
Adamson Lady Falcons	10	2	.833	1	32	14	.696
Lyceum Lady Pirates	7	5	.583	2	26	19	.578
FEU Lady Tamaraws	6	6	.500	3	20	21	.489
Ateneo Lady Eagles	6	6	.500	3	22	25	.468
NU Lady Bulldogs	2	10	.167	4	10	32	.238

SW = sets won; SL = sets lost

=== Results ===
Team	AdU	ADMU	FEU	LPU	NU	SSC-R
Adamson		3-0	3-1	3-0	3-0	3–2
Ateneo			1-3	2-3	3-1	0–3
FEU	3-1			0-3	3-1	0–3
Lyceum					3-0	1–3
NU						1–3

== Fourth-seed playoff ==
Date		Score		Set 1	Set 2	Set 3	Set 4	Set 5	Total
September	Ateneo Lady Eagles	1 - 3	FEU Lady Tamaraws	26 - 24	24 - 26	20 - 25	19 - 25	0 - 0	89 - 102

== Bracket ==
Best-of-3 semifinals
1	San Sebastian	2
4	FEU	0
2	Adamson	2
3	Lyceum	0

Best-of-3 Finals
1	San Sebastian	1
2	Adamson	2
Best-of-3 third-place
3	Lyceum	2
4	FEU	0

== Semifinals ==
=== SSC-R vs. FEU ===
September 9, 2:00PM – Filoil Flying V Arena, San Juan
Team	1	2	3	4	Sets
San Sebastian	30	25	22	25	3
FEU	28	16	25	20	1

SSC-R leads series, 1-0

September 12, 4:00PM – Filoil Flying V Arena, San Juan
Team	1	2	3	4	5	Sets
FEU	25	22	20	25	11	2
San Sebastian	20	25	25	19	15	3

SSC-R wins series, 2-0

=== Adamson vs. Lyceum ===
September 9, 4:00PM – Filoil Flying V Arena, San Juan
Team	1	2	3	4	5	Sets
Adamson	25	17	25	24	15	3
Lyceum	13	25	11	26	7	2

Adamson leads series, 1-0

September 9, 2:00PM – Filoil Flying V Arena, San Juan
Team	1	2	3	Sets
Lyceum	19	17	12	0
Adamson	25	25	25	3

Adamson wins series, 2-0

== Finals ==
=== Bronze series ===
September 16, 2:00PM – Filoil Flying V Arena, San Juan
Team	1	2	3	Sets
FEU	18	19	20	0
Lyceum	25	25	25	3

Lyceum leads series, 1-0

September 19, 2:00PM – Filoil Flying V Arena, San Juan
Team	1	2	3	4	Sets
Lyceum	25	21	25	25	3
FEU	21	25	20	11	1

Lyceum wins series, 2-0

=== Championship series ===
September 16, 4:00PM – Filoil Flying V Arena, San Juan
Team	1	2	3	4	5	Sets
Adamson	25	25	30	21	15	3
San Sebastian	13	17	32	25	13	2

Adamson leads series, 1-0

September 19, 4:00PM – Filoil Flying V Arena, San Juan
Team	1	2	3	4	Sets
San Sebastian	24	25	25	25	3
Adamson	26	23	22	20	1

Series Tied, 1-1

September 23, 4:00PM – Filoil Flying V Arena, San Juan
Team	1	2	3	Sets
San Sebastian	24	17	16	0
Adamson	26	25	25	3

Adamson wins series, 2-1

=== Final ranking ===
- Champion - Adamson Lady Falcons
- 1st runner-up - San Sebastian Lady Stags
- 2nd runner-up - Lyceum Lady Pirates
- 3rd runner-up - FEU Lady Tamaraws
