= 2006 Shakey's V-League season =

2006 SVL season
- League: Shakey's V-League
- Sport: Volleyball
- TV partner: ABC-5

1st Conference
- Season champions: De La Salle Lady Archers
- Runners-up: San Sebastian Lady Stags
- Season MVP: Cherry Rose Macatangay (Adamson)

Seasons
- ← 2005, 2nd 4th, 2007 →

The 2006 Shakey's V-League (SVL) season was the 3rd season of the Shakey's V-League.

== 1st conference ==
The Shakey's V-League 3rd Season 1st Conference was the 4th conference of the Shakey's V-League. The tournament started April 22, 2006.

=== Participating teams ===
Abbr.	Team
ADU	Adamson University Lady Falcons
ADM	Ateneo de Manila University Lady Eagles
DLS	De La Salle University Lady Archers
FEU	Far Eastern University Lady Tamaraws
LPU	Lyceum of the Philippines University Lady Pirates
PCU	Philippine Christian University Lady Dolphins
SSC	San Sebastian College–Recoletos Lady Stags
UEA	University of East Lady Warriors

=== Final standings ===
Rank	Team
1st place, gold medalist(s)	De La Salle University
2nd place, silver medalist(s)	San Sebastian College–Recoletos
3rd place, bronze medalist(s)	Adamson University
4	Lyceum of the Philippines University
5	Far Eastern University
6	Philippine Christian University
7	Ateneo de Manila University
8	University of East

=== Individual awards ===
Award	Name
Most Valuable Player	Cherry Rose Macatangay ( Adamson)
Best Scorer	Cherry Rose Macatangay ( Adamson)
Best Attacker	Desiree Hernandez ( La Salle)
Best Blocker	Michelle Laborte ( Ateneo)
Best Server	Concepcion Legaspi ( Lyceum)
Best Setter	Relea Ferina Saet ( La Salle)
Best Digger	Margarita Pepito ( San Sebastian)
Best Receiver	Sharmaine Miles Peñano ( La Salle)
Most Improved Player	Manilla Santos ( La Salle)

== Venues ==
- Blue Eagle Gym, Quezon City
