= 2008 Shakey's V-League 2nd Conference =

V-League 5th Season
Women's Finals	G1	G2	Wins
UST Growling Tigresses	0	1	2
San Sebastian Stags	3	3	0
- Duration: November 28–30, 2008
- Arena(s): The Arena in San Juan
- Finals MVP: Sue Roces
- Semifinalists: De La Salle Lady Archers; Adamson Lady Falcons
- TV network(s): NBN

The 2008 Shakey's V-League 2nd Conference was the eighth conference of the Shakey's V-League and the second conference of the 2008 season. The tournament began on October 19, 2008, at The Arena in the city of San Juan.

Joining are Ateneo de Manila University, Adamson University, De La Salle - College of Saint Benilde, De La Salle University, Far Eastern University, Lyceum of the Philippines University, San Sebastian College - Recoletos and University of Santo Tomas.

Former champion teams University of Santo Tomas and De La Salle University come back after being absent last conference.

After being thrice runner-up and a heartbreaking third-place finish last conference, San Sebastian College - Recoletos finally clinched the championship this season after finishing their former nemesis University of Santo Tomas in a sweep of the finals series.

== Starting line-ups ==
Colors	School	Setter	Middle	Open	Utility	Middle	Open	Libero
Adamson school colors	Adamson University	Janet Serafica*(A)	Rissa Jane Laguilles	Nerissa Bautista*(G); Michelle Segodine	Angelica Quinlog; Michelle Segodine; Danielle Michiko Castañeda*(G)	Pau Soriano	Angela Benting*(C)	Lizlee Ann Gata
Ateneo school colors	Ateneo de Manila University	Jamenea Ferrer	Ma. Rosario Soriano*(A); Bea Charmaine Pascual*(C)	Fille Saint Merced Cainglet	Ma. Carmina Denise Acevedo; Misha Quimpo	Michelle Laborte*(G); JimPercy Suman	Angeline Gervacio	Stephanie Gabriel
CSB school colors	De La Salle - College of Saint Benilde	Raquel Ordoñez*(A)(C); Renilyne Kara Agero; Anna Katrina Maranan	Cindy Velasquez	Katty Kwan	Anna Katrina Maranan; Renilyne Kara Agero; Raquel Ordoñez	Doreen Sanchez	Giza Yumang	Kerlene Joy Mulingtapang
FEU school colors	Far Eastern University	April Linor Jose; Maria Theresa Iratay*(A)	Mecaila Irish May Morada	Rachel Daquis*(C)	Cherry May Vivas	Shaira Gonzalez	Mary Rose Cabanag; Joan Bunay*(G)	Rose Anne Taganas
La Salle school colors	De La Salle University	Relea Ferina Saet*(A); Ma. Klarissa Martinez; Charleen Cruz	Michelle Pauline Datuin; Charleen Cruz	Stephanie Mercado; Carissa Anne Gotis*(G); Charleen Cruz	Celine Anne Hernandez; Charleen Cruz; Stephanie Mercado	Jacqueline Alarca	Manilla Santos*(C)	Regine Diego; Melissa Gohing
Lyceum's school colors	Lyceum of the Philippines University	Mary Grace Babalo	Beverly Boto*(G); Dahlia Cruz*(A)	Syvie Gay Artates	Bernadette Satsatin*(C)	Gasella Nica Guliman	Dahlia Cruz*(A); Joy Gazelle Cases*(G)	Joanna Marie dela Peña
SSC-R school colors	San Sebastian College - Recoletos	Charisse Vernon Ancheta; Jennelyn Belen	Sue Roces*(G); Melissa Mirasol	Analyn Joy Benito; Jinni Mondejar*(A)	Jinni Mondejar*(A); Margarita Pepito	Rysabelle Devanadera*(C)	Laurence Ann Latigay	Mary Jane Pepito
UST school colors	University of Santo Tomas	Denise Patricia Tan; Sarah Jane Gonzales	Micah Ortiz; Aiza Maizo*(C)	Judy Ann Cabbalejo; Bernice Abigail Co; Vida Rica Gutierrez*(C)	Aiza Maizo*(C); Bernice Abigail Co	Mary Jean Balse*(A)	Venus Bernal*(A)	Kimberly Lazaro; Jessica Curato

- (A) - Alumna Player
- (G) - Guest Player
- (C) - Team Captain

== Elimination round ==
Qualified for semifinals

#	Team	W	L	PW	PL	PQ
1	UST Growling Tigresses	6	1	608	575	1.057
2	San Sebastian Lady Stags	5	2	612	518	1.181
3	De La Salle Lady Archers	5	2	624	546	1.143
4	Adamson Lady Falcons	5	2	596	541	1.102
5	FEU Lady Tamaraws	3	4	509	537	0.948
6	Lyceum Lady Pirates	2	5	462	523	0.883
7	Ateneo Lady Eagles	1	6	567	639	0.887
8	Benilde Lady Blazers	1	6	440	552	0.797

PW = points won, PL = points lost, PQ = points quotient

Basis of breaking ties:

- Number of games won
- Higher points quotient

=== Games list ===
START OF ELIMINATIONS
TIME	OCTOBER 19 - THE ARENA, SAN JUAN						
TIME	Team	1st	2nd	3rd	4th	5th	Best Player
2 PM	Far Eastern University	23	23	23	-	-	Shaira Gonzalez
2 PM	De La Salle University	25	25	25			Celine Anne Hernandez
4 PM	San Sebastian College-Recoletos						Laurence Ann Latigay
4 PM	University of Santo Tomas						Michelle Carolino
TIME	OCTOBER 21 - FIL-OIL FLYING V ARENA, SAN JUAN						
TIME	Team	1st	2nd	3rd	4th	5th	Best Player
2 PM	Lyceum of the Philippines University	20	25	14	19	-	Dahlia Cruz
2 PM	Ateneo de Manila University	25	22	25	25	-	Angeline Gervacio
4 PM	De La Salle - College of Saint Benilde	17	25	25	-	-	Rissa Jane Laguilles
4 PM	De La Salle - College of Saint Benilde	21	13	22	-	-	Anna Katrina Maranan
TIME	OCTOBER 24 - THE ARENA, SAN JUAN						
TIME	Team	1st	2nd	3rd	4th	5th	Best Player
2 PM	Ateneo de Manila University	25	25	12	25	-	Michelle Laborte
2 PM	Lyceum of the Philippines University	14	21	25	21	-	Dahlia Cruz
4 PM	De La Salle University	18	25	25	25	-	Stephanie Mercado
4 PM	San Sebastian College - Recoletos	25	23	18	16	-	Laurence Anne Latigay
TIME	OCTOBER 26 - BLUE EAGLE GYM, QUEZON CITY						
TIME	Team	1st	2nd	3rd	4th	5th	Best Player
2 PM	San Sebastian College - Recoletos	24	25	25	25	-	Sue Roces
2 PM	Ateneo de Manila University	26	13	18	19	-	Fille Saint Merced Cainglet
4 PM	Lyceum of the Philippines University	18	15	20	-	-	Joy Gazelle Cases
4 PM	De La Salle University	25	25	25	-	-	Stephanie Mercado
TIME	OCTOBER 28 - THE ARENA, SAN JUAN						
TIME	Team	1st	2nd	3rd	4th	5th	Best Player
2 PM	San Sebastian College - Recoletos	25	25	25	-	-	Rysabelle Devanadera
2 PM	Lyceum of the Philippines University	18	19	20	-	-	Joy Gazelle Cases
4 PM	De La Salle University	25	25	21	26	-	Manilla Santos
4 PM	Ateneo de Manila University	21	15	25	24	-	Michelle Laborte
TIME	NOVEMBER 2 - THE ARENA, SAN JUAN						
TIME	Team	1st	2nd	3rd	4th	5th	Best Player
2 PM	De La Salle - College of Saint Benilde	8	6	7	-	-	Raquel Ordoñez
2 PM	Far Eastern University	25	25	25	-	-	Monique Tiangco
4 PM	Adamson University	23	25	25	25	-	Nerissa Bautista
4 PM	University of Santo Tomas	25	21	9	20	-	Venus Bernal
TIME	NOVEMBER 4 - THE ARENA, SAN JUAN						
TIME	Team	1st	2nd	3rd	4th	5th	Best Player
2 PM	Ateneo de Manila University	22	25	23	21	-	Michelle Laborte
2 PM	Adamson University	25	15	25	25	-	Rissa Jane Laguilles
4 PM	University of Santo Tomas	17	25	25	17	16	Mary Jean Balse
4 PM	De La Salle University	25	22	23	25	14	Manilla Santos
6 PM	Lyceum of the Philippines University	25	6	8	25	9	Syvie Gay Artates
6 PM	Far Eastern University	27	25	25	23	15	Macaila Irish May Morada
TIME	NOVEMBER 7 - THE ARENA, SAN JUAN						
TIME	Team	1st	2nd	3rd	4th	5th	Best Player
2 PM	Adamson University	25	25	25	-	-	Lizlee Ann Gata
2 PM	De La Salle University	20	18	23	-	-	Jacqueline Alarca
4 PM	De La Salle - College of Saint Benilde	14	18	23	-	-	Doreen Sanchez
4 PM	Lyceum of the Philippines University	25	25	25	-	-	Dahlia Cruz
TIME	NOVEMBER 9 - THE ARENA, SAN JUAN						
TIME	Team	1st	2nd	3rd	4th	5th	Best Player
2 PM	San Sebastian College - Recoletos	25	25	25	-	-	Rysabelle Devanadera
2 PM	Far Eastern University	20	18	17	-	-	Rachel Daquis
4 PM	De La Salle University	25	21	25	25	-	Jacqueline Alarca
4 PM	De La Salle - College of Saint Benilde	18	25	10	17	-	Renilyne Kara Agero
TIME	NOVEMBER 11 - THE ARENA, SAN JUAN						
TIME	Team	1st	2nd	3rd	4th	5th	Best Player
2 PM	Lyceum of the Philippines University	24	16	16	-	-	Dahlia Cruz
2 PM	Adamson University	26	25	25	-	-	Nerissa Bautista
4 PM	Far Eastern University	13	17	12	-	-	Shaira Gonzalez
4 PM	University of Santo Tomas	25	25	25	-	-	Mary Jean Balse
6 PM	Ateneo de Manila University	25	17	22	23	-	Ma. Carmina Denise Acevedo
6 PM	De La Salle - College of Saint Benilde	21	25	25	25	-	Giza Yumang
TIME	NOVEMBER 14 - THE ARENA, SAN JUAN						
TIME	Team	1st	2nd	3rd	4th	5th	Best Player
2 PM	Far Eastern University	25	25	25	-	-	Rachel Daquis
2 PM	Ateneo de Manila University	21	19	23	-	-	Angeline Marie Gervacio
4 PM	San Sebastian College - Recoletos	23	25	25	25	11	Sue Roces
4 PM	University of Santo Tomas	25	17	14	27	15	Mary Jean Balse
TIME	NOVEMBER 16 - THE ARENA, SAN JUAN						
TIME	Team	1st	2nd	3rd	4th	5th	Best Player
2 PM	Lyceum of the Philippines University	23	10	20	-	-	Beverly Boto
2 PM	University of Santo Tomas	25	25	25	-	-	Venus Bernal
4 PM	San Sebastian College - Recoletos	25	25	22	25	-	Laurence Anne Latigay
4 PM	Adamson University	21	20	25	20	-	Rissa Jane Laguilles
TIME	NOVEMBER 18 - THE ARENA, SAN JUAN						
TIME	Team	1st	2nd	3rd	4th	5th	Best Player
2 PM	De La Salle - College of Saint Benilde	17	21	15	-	-	Giza Yumang
2 PM	San Sebastian College - Recoletos	25	25	25	-	-	Laurence Anne Latigay
4 PM	University of Santo Tomas	25	25	27	23	15	Venus Bernal
4 PM	Ateneo de Manila University	15	23	29	25	12	Michelle Laborte
END OF ELIMINATIONS

== Bracket ==
Semi-finals
Best-of-3 games
UST	2
Adamson	1
Best-of-3 games
San Sebastian	2
La Salle	0

Final
Best-of-3 games
UST	0
San Sebastian	2
Third place
Best-of-3 games
Adamson	1
La Salle	1

== Semifinals ==
START OF SEMI-FINALS
TIME	NOVEMBER 21 - THE ARENA, SAN JUAN						
TIME	Team	1st	2nd	3rd	4th	5th	Best Player
2 PM	Adamson University	25	25	22	25	-	Angela Benting
2 PM	University of Santo Tomas	20	18	25	23	-	Mary Jean Balse
4 PM	De La Salle University	25	19	25	25	16	Jacqueline Alarca
4 PM	San Sebastian College - Recoletos	27	25	14	12	18	Rysabelle Devanadera
TIME	NOVEMBER 23 - THE ARENA, SAN JUAN						
TIME	Team	1st	2nd	3rd	4th	5th	Best Player
2 PM	San Sebastian College - Recoletos	21	25	20	28	16	Rysabelle Devanadera
2 PM	De La Salle University *	25	17	25	26	14	Charleen Cruz
4 PM	University of Santo Tomas	15	30	26	25	-	Venus Bernal
4 PM	Adamson University	25	28	24	22	-	Nerissa Bautista
TIME	NOVEMBER 25 - THE ARENA, SAN JUAN						
TIME	Team	1st	2nd	3rd	4th	5th	Best Player
4 PM	Adamson University	25	14	20	25	13	Nerissa Bautista
4 PM	University of Santo Tomas	17	25	25	9	15	Judy Ann Caballejo
END OF SEMI-FINALS

- with season high, 22 blocks

== Finals ==
START OF FINALS
TIME	NOVEMBER 28 - THE ARENA, SAN JUAN						
TIME	Team	1st	2nd	3rd	4th	5th	Best Player
2 PM	Adamson University	25	21	24	32	15	Nerissa Bautista
2 PM	De La Salle University	15	25	26	30	10	Manilla Santos
4 PM	University of Santo Tomas	21	19	24	-	-	Venus Bernal
4 PM	San Sebastian College - Recoletos	25	25	26	-	-	Laurence Anne Latigay
TIME	NOVEMBER 30 - THE ARENA, SAN JUAN						
TIME	Team	1st	2nd	3rd	4th	5th	Best Player
2 PM	De La Salle University	19	25	25	25	-	Michelle Pauline Datuin
2 PM	Adamson University	25	18	16	20		Nerissa Bautista
4 PM	San Sebastian College - Recoletos	16	25	25	25	-	Analyn Joy Benito
4 PM	University of Santo Tomas	25	21	16	21	-	Venus Bernal

== Conference Awardees ==
- Best scorer: Laurence Ann Latigay (SSC-R)
- Best attacker: Rysabelle Devanadera (SSC-R)
- Best blocker: Jacqueline Alarca (La Salle)
- Best setter: Janet Serafica (Adamson)
- Best digger: Lizlee Ann Gata (Adamson)
- Best server: Aiza Maizo (UST)
- Best receiver: Mary Jane Pepito (SSC-R)
- Conference MVP: Laurence Anne Latigay (SSC-R)
- Finals MVP: Sue Roces (SSC-R)
