= San Sebastian Stags, Lady Stags and Staglets =

College basketball team in Metro Manila

San Sebastian Golden Stags and Lady Stags
- School: San Sebastian College – Recoletos
- League: NCAA
- Joined: 1969
- Location: C. M. Recto Avenue, Manila
- Team colors: Red and Gold
- Women's team: Lady Stags
- Juniors' team: Golden Staglets

Seniors' general championships
- NCAA: 4 (1984-1985, 1988-1989, 1989-1990, 1994-1995)

Juniors' general championships
- NCAA: 6 (2005, 2006, 2009, 2010, 2011, 2012)

The San Sebastian Golden Stags and Lady Stags, also known collectively as the SSC-R Stags, are the National Collegiate Athletic Association (Philippines) varsity teams of the San Sebastian College – Recoletos. Their five consecutive NCAA seniors basketball championships was the longest streak in the NCAA.

The college's juniors team are the San Sebastian Staglets.

== Monicker ==
The Recollect fathers chose a stag for it symbolizes a Christian who, filled with moral ideas, runs fast to God swiftly yet quietly in pursuit of his goals.

The use of the stag as SSC-R symbol started when SSC-R, originally an exclusive school for boys, joined the National Collegiate Athletic Association. In religion, the stag is a symbol of moral ideals. It was used by the early Christians as an emblem of Christ and as a figure of the apostles. It became the symbol of administration of baptism because of its capacity to carry heavy load or object. It was also used as the symbol of the catechumen who aspired for martyrdom.

Some of the Holy Fathers presented the Stags as model of what a Christian should do when a pagan threatens him. That is to run away fast to God. A fitting comparison because aside from swiftness coupled with quietness in the pursuit of goals, the stags is gifted with speed and nimbleness to evade dangers. Like a stag, a Christian should be quick to avoid the practice and agencies when they become moral threats. In the same manner, without the hunter knowing it, the stag would lead the hunter out of the jungle into a cleared area. A Christian should do no less. Even as he evades the temptations of the consumeristic and materialistic establishments, he should guide the owners and consumers out of the jungle of sin to the cleared area of salvation.

== Bravo ==
Literally, it means, “brave” taken from the Latin word “bravura” which means “courage”. But courage does not mean being the “siga-siga” type who does not run away from a fight. It means evading or running away from dangers of his soul. A coward runs away with a trembling heart and a broken spirit. A courageous man runs away with a firm heart, a strong faith and triumphant soul, and we salute this type of man.

== Colors ==
The colors Red and Gold were adopted as to identify San Sebastian College during the National College Athletic Association. Red symbolizes sacrifice, martyrdom, bravery and baptism. The element of Gold represented by its shimmering color, on the other hand, stands for endurance and the perennial quest for high standards – inner strength in the quest for excellence – symbolic of the loyal dignity of a true Christian. Thus, the Sebastinian renders sacrifices and, in a way, martyrdom, for he submits himself to the pains of rigorous training and discipline in his quest for glory. This entails bravery not only in fighting for victory but in accepting defeat graciously as well; and endurance to be able to withstand pain.

== Corporate support ==
In 2016, Foton Motor Philippines, the exclusive distributor of Foton motor vehicles in the Philippines signed an agreement to support the athletics program of the San Sebastian College and helping in the growth and success of the school athletes. The agreement signing was witnessed by Foton officials Rommel Sytin and Alvin Lu and San Sebastian officials Atty. Raymund Munsayac and Coach Roger Gorayeb.

== Basketball ==
Old logo used from NCAA Season 81 up to NCAA Season 98

=== The San Sebastian Stags Basketball Team ===
The Golden Stags have won 12 titles in the NCAA since 1973. Their last title was in 2009-10. The team featured the then-rookie Calvin Abueva who would become the most outstanding player in the school's history.

The San Sebastian Staglets Junior Basketball Team

NCAA SEASON 102

San Sebastian Golden Staglets roster
Players
Coaches

Pos.	No.	Nat.	Name	Height	Year	High School
CG	9	(Philippines)	Allado, Prince	6'1" (1.85m)	–	–
PF	3	(Philippines)	Aninipot, Angelou	6'2" (1.88m)	–	–
G	31	(Philippines)	Canillo, Paul	–	–	–
G	2	(Philippines)	Castillo, Khaizer (C)	–	–	–
SF	25	(Philippines)	Cuya, Dan	5'9" (1.75m)	–	–
SG	100	(Philippines)	Dela Cruz, Don	–	–	–
PF/C	0	(Philippines)	Ezenwa, Joel	6'2" (1.88m)	–	–
—	26	(Philippines)	Flores, Justine	–	–	–
PG	24		Gaviola, Keith	5'8" (1.73m)	–	–
PF/C	81	(Philippines)	Gutierrez, Marc	6'5" (1.96m)	–	–
PG	18	(Philippines)	Humady, Knas	5'5" (1.65m)	–	–
SG	12	(Philippines)	Lazaro, Jed	6'1" (1.85m)	–	–
—	16	(Philippines)	Pacheco, Yuan	–	–	–
G/F	15	(Philippines)	Pineda, Tracy	6'0" (1.83m)	–	–
PF	10	(Philippines)	Ramiso, John	5'11" (1.8m)	–	–
PF/C	8	(Philippines)	Serrano, Steven	6'2" (1.88m)	–	–
SG	91	(Philippines)	Tepan, Jaf	5'10" (1.78m)	–	–
F	13	(Philippines)	Whittaker, Edwin	6'3" (1.91m)	–	–

Head coach

Richie Melencio

Legend

- (C) Team captain
- Injured

The Sebastian Lady Stags was the most number of championship in the NCAA with 23 championship titles.

=== Team roster ===
San Sebastian Lady Stags
No.	Name	Position
1	Santos, Katherine	
2	Cañete, Reyann	
3	Bermillo, Jewelle (c)	L
4	Marasigan, Christina	
6	Tan, Roxanne	L
7	Requierme, Shane	
8	Dionisio, Kristine Joy	MB
9	Sison, Alexia Vea	S
10	Tan, Kamille Josephine Amaka	
11	Ultu, Angela Nicole	
13	Carreon, Jamille Veronica	
14	Ordoña, Bianca	
16	San Juan, Alyssa Joy	
	Guibao, Jamie Annika (r)	
	Roger Gorayeb	HC

NCAA Season 95

San Sebastian Lady Stags
No.	Name	Position
1	DAPOL, Mary Rhose (c)	Outside hitter
2	CANETE, Reyann	
3	REQUIRME, Shannai Shane	Middle blocker
4	CONSUEGRA, Queene	
5	AREVALO, Coleen Dorothy	
6	TAN, Roxanne	Libero
7	CAPUTOLAN, Alla Mae	
9	SISON, Alexia Vea	Setter
10	TAN, Kamille Josephine Amaka	
11	LIM, Catherine Gabrielle	Libero
12	DELA CRUZ, Christine	
13	CARREON, Jamille Veronica	
14	ORDONA, Bianca	
19	BIGATA, Sherielyn	Middle blocker

- Head coach: Roger Gorayeb
- Asst. coach: Clint Malazo

== See also ==
- San Beda-San Sebastian rivalry
