= Air Force Women's Volleyball Club =

Thai volleyball club

Quint Air Force
- Full name: Air Force Women's Volleyball Clubb
- Nickname: The Blue Eagles
- Founded: 2014; 12 years ago, as Bangkok Glass; 2018; 8 years ago, as Air Force
- Dissolved: 2019
- Ground: Chandrubeksa Stadium; Don Mueang District, Bangkok, Thailand (Capacity: 4,000)
- Chairman: (Thailand) Suppakorn Jitreekan
- Head coach: (Thailand) Padejsuk Wannachote
- League: Thailand League
- 2018-19: 5th place
- Website: Club home page
- Championships: Asian Champion Thailand League Champion Super League Champion

Uniforms
| Home | Away |

Air Force Women's Volleyball Club (Thai: สโมสรวอลเลย์บอลหญิงแอร์ฟอร์ซ) was a Thai professional volleyball club based in Don Mueang District, Bangkok and had been managed by Air Force Volleyball Club Co., Ltd which was a subsidiary of Royal Thai Air Force.

The club had played at the top level of Thai volleyball for the majority of their existence and competed in the Thailand League. The club was founded in 2014 as BG VC (Bangkok Glass Volleyball Club) before reformed into Air Force WVC in 2018. Their home stadium was Chandrubeksa Stadium which has a capacity of 4,000.

== History ==
=== As Bangkok Glass (2014–2018) ===
The club was founded in 2014, and had been managed by BGFC Sport Company Limited,.

The first tournament the club participated in was the Pro Challenge, 2014 (Division 1) in July 2014. The BGVC won the championship, granting them a promotion to the highest level of competition; the Volleyball Thailand League 2014–2015.

=== As Air Force (2018–2019) ===
The club transferred the right to compete in the Thailand League to Proflex Women's Volleyball Club in 2019.

== Crest ==
The club logo incorporated elements from their mascot and nickname; The Blue Eagle.

== 2018–2019 squad ==
Air Force Women's Volleyball Club team squad
| Number | Player | Position | Height (m) | Weight (kg) | Birth date |
|---|---|---|---|---|---|
| 1 | (Thailand) Maliwan Prabnarong | Opposite | 1.73 | 58 | 27 August 1990 (age 35) |
| 2 | (Thailand) Thitapa Tongsidee | Setter | 1.73 | 58 | 4 January 1996 (age 30) |
| 3 | (Thailand) Sutadta Chuewulim (c) | Outside Hitter | 1.73 | 67 | 19 December 1992 (age 33) |
| 4 | (Thailand) Wiravan Sattayanuchit | Outside Hitter | 1.77 | 61 | 7 April 1993 (age 33) |
| 6 | (Thailand) Thidarat Pengwichai | Opposite | 1.78 | 75 | 28 November 1992 (age 33) |
| 7 | (Thailand) Wanatda Thongnun | Middle Blocker | 1.83 | 58 | 20 December 1997 (age 28) |
| 8 | (Thailand) Pimpila Muekkhuntod | Outside Hitter | 1.70 | 65 | 20 November 1996 (age 29) |
| 9 | (Vietnam) Trần Thị Bích Thủy | Middle Blocker | 1.83 | 65 | 11 November 2000 (age 25) |
| 10 | (Vietnam) Trịnh Thị Khánh | Outside Hitter | 1.82 | 75 | 2 April 1997 (age 29) |
| 11 | (Thailand) Suwaphitch Suwannasing | Middle Blocker | 1.77 | 61 | 1 June 2000 (age 25) |
| 12 | (Thailand) Anongporn Promrat | Middle Blocker | 1.82 | 72 | 2 May 1992 (age 33) |
| 13 | (Thailand) Natthanicha Jaisaen | Setter | 1.73 | 58 | 21 May 1998 (age 27) |
| 14 | (Thailand) Sirikon Singsom | Outside Spiker | 1.57 | 51 | 27 July 2000 (age 25) |
| 15 | (Thailand) Duenpen Areelue | Libero | 1.70 | 68 | 2 November 1990 (age 35) |
| 16 | (Thailand) Narissara Kaewma | Libero | 1.61 | 52 | 11 April 1996 (age 30) |
| 17 | (Thailand) Nutchanat Thongsungnoen | Outside Hitter | 1.71 | 51 | 17 May 2000 (age 25) |
| 19 | (Thailand) Pattrathip Santakoon | Setter | 1.67 | 56 | 17 June 1996 (age 29) |
| 20 | (Thailand) Sunisa Kongsui | Outside Spiker | 1.77 | 61 | 6 July 1999 (age 26) |

== Honors ==
=== Domestic competitions ===
==== League ====
- Thailand League
  - Champion (2): 2014–15, 2015–16, as Bangkok Glass
  - Runner-up (2): 2016–17, as Bangkok Glass
  - Third place (1): 2017–18, as Bangkok Glass
- Super League
  - Champion (2): 2015, 2016, as Bangkok Glass
  - Runner-up (2): 2017, 2018, as Bangkok Glass
- Pro Challenge
  - Champion (1): 2014, as Bangkok Glass

==== Cup ====
- Kor Royal Cup
  - Runner-up (2): 2016, 2017, as Bangkok Glass B

==== Youth League ====
- Academy U18 League
  - Third place (2): 2015,2016, as Bangkok Glass U18

== Previous names ==
- 2018–2019: Quint Air Force
