= Karina Krause =

Thai volleyball player (born 1989)

Personal information
- Full name: Karina Krause
- Nickname: Na
- Nationality: Thai
- Born: February 11, 1989 (age 37); Yasothon, Thailand
- Height: 1.78 m (5 ft 10 in)
- Weight: 64 kg (141 lb)
- Spike: 295 cm (116 in)
- Block: 285 cm (112 in)

Volleyball information
- Position: Middle Blocker
- Current club: Thai–Denmark Khonkaen Star
- Number: 18

Career
Years	Teams
2011–2014	3BB Nakhonnont
2014–2018	Bangkok Glass
2018–	Thai–Denmark Khonkaen Star

National team
2021	Thailand

Karina Krause (Thai: คารีน่า เคร้าเซอ, born 11 February 1989) is a Thai indoor volleyball player. She is a member of the Thailand women's national volleyball team.

== Awards ==
=== Individuals ===
- 2016 Thai-Denmark Super League "Best Server"

=== Clubs ===
- 2011 Princess's Cup – Runner–Up, with PEA Club
- 2011–12 Thailand League – Champion, with Nakornnonthaburi
- 2012 Princess's Cup – Champion, with PEA Club
- 2012–13 Thailand League – Runner–Up, with Nakornnonthaburi
- 2013 Princess's Cup – Champion, with PEA Sisaket
- 2014 Pro Challenge – Champion, with Bangkok Glass
- 2014–2015 Thailand League – Champion, with Bangkok Glass
- 2015 Thai–Denmark Super League – Champion, with Bangkok Glass
- 2015 Asian Club Championship – Champion, with Bangkok Glass
- 2015–2016 Thailand League – Champion, with Bangkok Glass
- 2016 Thai–Denmark Super League – Champion, with Bangkok Glass
- 2016 Sealect Tuna Championship – Runner–Up, with Bangkok Glass
- 2016 Asian Club Championship – Bronze medal, with Bangkok Glass
- 2016–17 Thailand League – Runner–up, with Bangkok Glass
- 2017 Thai–Denmark Super League – Runner–up, with Bangkok Glass
- 2017–18 Thailand League – Third, with Bangkok Glass
- 2018 Thai–Denmark Super League – Runner–up, with Bangkok Glass
- 2019 Thai–Denmark Super League – Third, with Khonkaen Star
