= Sutadta Chuewulim =

Thai indoor volleyball player

Sutadta Jarawat

Personal information
- Nickname: Noot
- Nationality: Thai
- Born: December 19, 1992 (age 33); Kanchanaburi, Thailand
- Height: 1.73 m (5 ft 8 in)
- Weight: 64 kg (141 lb)

Volleyball information
- Position: Outside hitter
- Current club: Lalitpur Queens
- Number: 9

National team
2010, 2021–2023	Thailand

Sutadta Jarawat (Thai: สุทัตตา เชื้อวู้หลิม, former Sutadta Chuewulim, born 19 December 1992 in Kanchanaburi) is a Thai indoor volleyball player. She is a member of the Thailand women's national volleyball team.

== Clubs ==
- (Thailand) Supreme Chonburi (2010–2014)
- (Philippines) Cagayan Valley Lady Rising Suns (2012)
- (Thailand) Bangkok Glass (2014–2017)
- (Thailand) Queen Air Force (2018–2019)
- (Philippines) United Volleyball Club (2019)
- (Philippines) BPI Globe BanKo Perlas Spikers (2019)
- (Thailand) Supreme Chonburi (2019–2022)
- (Thailand) Diamond Food–Fine Chef (2023–2024)
- (Vietnam) Than Quảng Ninh VC (2024) (loan)
- (Philippines) Galeries Tower Highrisers (2024)
- (Nepal) Lalitpur Queens (2024)

== Awards ==
=== Individuals ===
- 2016 PSL Invitational Cup "Best outside spiker"
- 2020 Thailand League "Best outside spiker"

=== Clubs ===
- 2012 Shakey's V-League Open Conference 9th Season - Runner-up, with Cagayan Valley Lady Rising Suns
- 2014–2015 Thailand League - Champion, with Bangkok Glass
- 2015 Thai-Denmark Super League - Champion, with Bangkok Glass
- 2015 Asian Club Championship - Champion, with Bangkok Glass
- 2015–2016 Thailand League - Champion, with Bangkok Glass
- 2016 Thai-Denmark Super League - Champion, with Bangkok Glass
- 2016 Asian Club Championship - Third, with Bangkok Glass
- 2016 PSL Invitational Cup - Champion, with Est Cola
- 2016–17 Thailand League - Runner-up, with Bangkok Glass
- 2017 Thai-Denmark Super League - Runner-up, with Bangkok Glass
- 2017–18 Thailand League - Third, with Bangkok Glass
- 2018 Thai-Denmark Super League - Runner-up, with Bangkok Glass
- 2020 Thailand League – Champion, with Supreme Chonburi

=== National team ===
- 2008 Asian Youth Championship - Bronze medal
