= Witita Balee =

Thai indoor volleyball player (born 1991)

Personal information
- Nickname: Yui
- Nationality: Thai
- Born: March 27, 1991 (age 35) Sakon Nakhon, Thailand
- Height: 1.70 m (5 ft 7 in)
- Weight: 56 kg (123 lb)
- Spike: 270 cm (106 in)
- Block: 262 cm (103 in)

Volleyball information
- Position: Setter
- Current club: Bangkok Glass
- Number: 13

Career
- Years: Team
- 2010–2014: Udonthani
- 2014–: Bangkok Glass

Witita Balee (Thai: วิฑิตา บาลี, born 27 March 1991) is a Thai indoor volleyball player. With her club Bangkok Glass she competed at the 2016 FIVB Volleyball Women's Club World Championship.

== Awards ==
=== Clubs ===
- 2014–2015 Thailand League - Champion, with Bangkok Glass
- 2015 Thai-Denmark Super League - Champion, with Bangkok Glass
- 2015 Asian Club Championship - Champion, with Bangkok Glass
- 2015–2016 Thailand League - Champion, with Bangkok Glass
- 2016 Thai-Denmark Super League - Champion, with Bangkok Glass
- 2016 Asian Club Championship - place, with Bangkok Glass
- 2016–17 Thailand League - Runner-up, with Bangkok Glass
- 2017 Thai-Denmark Super League - Runner-up, with Bangkok Glass
- 2017–18 Thailand League - Third, with Bangkok Glass
- 2018 Thai-Denmark Super League - Runner-up, with Bangkok Glass
