= Rasamee Supamool =

Thai volleyball player (born 1992)

Personal information
- Full name: Rassamee Supamool
- Nickname: Mee
- Nationality: Thai
- Born: January 10, 1992 (age 34); Nakhon Ratchasima, Thailand
- Height: 1.81 m (5 ft 11 in)
- Weight: 75 kg (165 lb)

Volleyball information
- Position: Opposite hitter
- Number: 14

Career
Years	Teams
2010–2014	Nakhon Ratchasima
2014–2018	Bangkok Glass

National team
2010–2011	Thailand

Rasamee Supamool (Thai: รัศมี สุพะมูล, born 10 January 1992) is a Thai volleyball player who represented her country at the 2010 FIVB Women's World Championship.

== Awards ==
=== Clubs ===
- 2013–14 Thailand League - Champion, with Nakhon Ratchasima
- 2014–15 Thailand League - Champion, with Bangkok Glass
- 2015 Thai-Denmark Super League - Champion, with Bangkok Glass
- 2015 Asian Club Championship - Champion, with Bangkok Glass
- 2016–17 Thailand League - Runner-up, with Bangkok Glass
- 2017 Thai-Denmark Super League - Runner-up, with Bangkok Glass
- 2017–18 Thailand League - Third, with Bangkok Glass
- 2018 Thai-Denmark Super League - Runner-up, with Bangkok Glass

=== National team ===
- 2008 Asian Youth Championship - Bronze Medal
- 2010 Asian Cup Championship - Silver Medal
