= Maliwan Prabnarong =

Thai volleyball player (born 1990)

Personal information
- Nickname: Aui
- Born: August 27, 1990 (age 36); Khon Kaen, Thailand
- Height: 1.73 m (5 ft 8 in)
- Weight: 58 kg (128 lb)
- Spike: 280 cm (110 in)
- Block: 275

Volleyball information
- Position: Opposite
- Current club: Bangkok Glass
- Number: 1

Career
Years	Teams
2010–2014	Udonthani
2014–2017	Bangkok Glass
2018–	Queen Air Force

Maliwan Prabnarong (Thai: มลิวรรณ ปราบณรงค์, born 27 August 1990) is a Thai indoor volleyball. With her club Bangkok Glass she competed at the 2016 World Club Championship.

== Awards ==
=== Individuals ===
- 2013–2014 Thailand League "Best opposite spiker"

=== Clubs ===
- 2014–2015 Thailand League - Champion, with Bangkok Glass
- 2015 Thai-Denmark Super League - Champion, with Bangkok Glass
- 2015 Asian Club Championship - Champion, with Bangkok Glass
- 2015–2016 Thailand League - Champion, with Bangkok Glass
- 2016 Thai-Denmark Super League - Champion, with Bangkok Glass
- 2016–17 Thailand League - Runner-up, with Bangkok Glass
- 2017 Thai-Denmark Super League - Runner-up, with Bangkok Glass
- 2017–18 Thailand League - Third, with Bangkok Glass
- 2018 Thai-Denmark Super League - Runner-up, with Bangkok Glass
