= Jarasporn Bundasak =

Thai indoor volleyball player (born 1993)

Personal information
- Nickname: Deer
- Nationality: Thai
- Born: 1 March 1993 (age 33); Nakhon Ratchasima, Thailand
- Height: 1.82 m (6 ft 0 in)
- Weight: 68 kg (150 lb)
- Spike: 300 cm (120 in)
- Block: 290 cm (110 in)

Volleyball information
- Position: Middle Blocker
- Current club: (Chinese Taipei) New Taipei CMFC
- Number: 99

National team
2013–2018, 2022	Thailand
Honours
Women's volleyball
Representing Thailand
Asian Games
Bronze medal – third place	2022 Hangzhou	Team
Asian Championship
Gold medal – first place	2023 Nakhon Ratchasima
Silver medal – second place	2017 Biñan	Team
Bronze medal – third place	2015 Tianjin	Team
Asian Cup
Bronze medal – third place	2016 Vinh Phuc	Team
Summer Universiade
Bronze medal – third place	2013 Kazan	Team
Southeast Asian Games
Gold medal – first place	2015 Singapore	Team
Gold medal – first place	2017 Kuala Lumpur	Team

Jarasporn Bundasak (Thai: จรัสพร บรรดาศักดิ์, RTGS: Charatphon Bandasak; born 1 March 1993) is a Thai indoor volleyball player. She is a current member of the Thailand women's national volleyball team.

== Career ==
Bundasak ranked in seventh place in the 2016 Club World Championship playing with Bangkok Glass.

She participated at the 2015 U23 World Championship, and 2016 World Grand Prix.

== Clubs ==
- (Thailand) Nakhon Ratchasima (2010–2014)
- (Thailand) Bangkok Glass (2014–2018)
- (Thailand) Nakhon Ratchasima (2018–2019)
- (Thailand) Diamond Food (2019–2021)
- (Japan) Denso Airybees (2021–2022)
- (Thailand) Nakhon Ratchasima (2022–2024)
- (Chinese Taipei) New Taipei CMFC (2024–)

== Awards ==
=== Clubs ===
- 2013–14 Thailand League – Champion, with Nakhon Ratchasima
- 2014–15 Thailand League – Champion, with Bangkok Glass
- 2015 Thai–Denmark Super League – Champion, with Bangkok Glass
- 2015–16 Thailand League – Champion, with Bangkok Glass
- 2016 Thai–Denmark Super League – Champion, with Bangkok Glass
- 2016 PSL Invitational Cup – Co-champion, with Est Cola
- 2016–17 Thailand League – Runner-up, with Bangkok Glass
- 2018–19 Thailand League – Champion, with Nakhon Ratchasima
- 2016 Asian Club Championship – Bronze medal with Bangkok Glass
