= Thidarat Pengwichai =

Thai volleyball player (born 1992)

Personal information
- Nickname: Paew
- Nationality: Thailand
- Born: November 28, 1992 (age 33) Khon Kaen, Thailand
- Height: 1.78 m (5 ft 10 in)
- Weight: 71 kg (157 lb)
- Spike: 286 cm (113 in)
- Block: 277 cm (109 in)

Volleyball information
- Position: Opposite
- Current club: Queen Air Force
- Number: 6

Career
- Years: Team
- 2012–2015: Ayutthaya A.T.C.C
- 2015–2016: King-Bangkok
- 2016–2017: Bangkok Glass
- 2018–: Queen Air Force

Thidarat Pengwichai (Thai: ธิดารัตน์ เพ็งวิชัย, born 28 November 1992) is a Thai indoor volleyball player. With her club Bangkok Glass she competed at the 2016 World Club Championship.

== Awards ==
=== Clubs ===
- 2013 Thai-Denmark Super League - Bronze medal, with Ayutthaya A.T.C.C
- 2013–14 Thailand League - Bronze medal, with Krungkao Mektec
- 2014 Thai-Denmark Super League - Champion, with Ayutthaya A.T.C.C
- 2014–15 Thailand League - Runner-Up, with Ayutthaya A.T.C.C
- 2015 Thai-Denmark Super League - Bronze medal, with Ayutthaya A.T.C.C
- 2016 Asian Club Championship - Bronze medal, with Bangkok Glass
- 2016–17 Thailand League - Runner-up, with Bangkok Glass
- 2017 Thai-Denmark Super League - Runner-up, with Bangkok Glass
- 2017–18 Thailand League - Third, with Bangkok Glass
- 2018 Thai-Denmark Super League - Runner-up, with Bangkok Glass
