= Wipawee Srithong =

Thai volleyball player (born 1999)

Personal information
- Full name: Wipawee Srithong
- Nickname: Mod
- Nationality: Thai
- Born: 28 January 1999 (age 27) Chiang Rai, Thailand
- Height: 1.74 m (5 ft 9 in)
- Weight: 66 kg (146 lb)
- Spike: 288 cm (113 in)
- Block: 266 cm (105 in)

Volleyball information
- Position: Outside spiker
- Current club: (South Korea) Suwon Hyundai E&C Hillstate
- Number: 1 (National Team), 23 (Club)

National team
- Years: Team
- 2017–2022: Thailand
Honours
Women's volleyball
Representing Thailand
Asian Games
Bronze medal – third place	2022 Hangzhou	Team
Asian Championship
Gold medal – first place	2023 Nakhon Ratchasima
Silver medal – second place	2017 Biñan	Team

Wipawee Srithong (Thai: วิภาวี ศรีทอง, born 28 January 1999) is a Thai volleyball player. She is part of the Thailand women's national volleyball team. On club level she played for Supreme Chonburi.

== Club ==
- (Thailand) Supreme Chonburi (2014–2019)
- (Vietnam) Kinh Bắc Bắc Ninh (2019) on loan
- (Thailand) Supreme Chonburi (2020–2022)
- (Thailand) Diamond Food (2022–2023)
- (Vietnam) LP Bank Ninh Bình (2023) on loan
- (South Korea) Suwon Hyundai E&C Hillstate (2023–2025)

== Awards ==
=== Individuals ===
- 2016 Asean Junior Championship – "Best outside spiker"

=== Clubs ===
- 2015–16 Thailand League – Runner-up, with Supreme Chonburi
- 2016–17 Thailand League – Champion, with Supreme Chonburi
- 2017 Thai–Denmark Super League – Champion, with Supreme Chonburi
- 2017–18 Thailand League – Champion, with Supreme Chonburi
- 2018 Thai–Denmark Super League – Champion, with Supreme Chonburi
- 2018–19 Thailand League – Runner-up, with Supreme Chonburi
- 2019 Thai–Denmark Super League – Champion, with Supreme Chonburi
- 2018 Asian Club Championship – Champion, with Supreme Chonburi
- 2019 Asian Club Championship – Runner-up, with Supreme Chonburi
- 2020 Thailand League – Champion, with Supreme Chonburi
- 2023 Asian Club Championship – Runner-up, with Diamond Food–Fine Chef
- 2023–24 South Korea V-League – Champion, with Suwon Hyundai Hillstate
