= Ashley Frazier =

American volleyball player (born 1989)

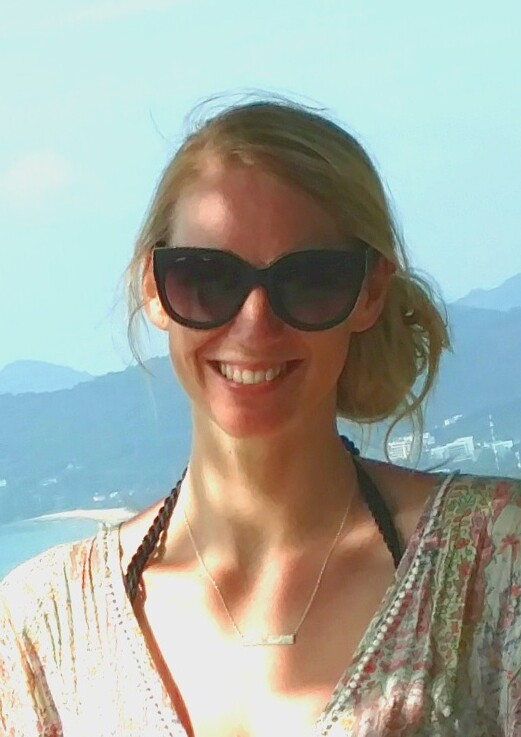
- Frazier at Karon Viewpoint, 2016

Personal information
- Full name: Ashley Lynn Frazier
- Born: December 15, 1989 (age 36); Oregon, Ohio, U.S.
- Height: 6 ft 2 in (1.87 m)
- Weight: 150 lb (70 kg)
- Spike: 119 in (302 cm)
- Block: 116 in (294 cm)
- Education: University of Kentucky; University of Alabama

Volleyball information
- Position: Outside Hitter
- Current club: Bangkok Glass
- Number: 16

Ashley Lynn Frazier (born December 15, 1989) is an American professional volleyball player.

== Personal ==
Ashley Frazier, daughter of Greg and Nancy Frazier, is from Oregon, Ohio. She graduated from Central Catholic High School (Toledo, Ohio) in 2008. Ashley graduated from the University of Kentucky Gatton College of Business and Economics in 2013 with a 3.9 GPA in management and marketing. Kentucky's female Scholar-Athlete of the Year in 2013.

== Career ==
=== High school ===
Frazier went to Central Catholic High School from 2004 to 2008, winning the 2007 Ohio D2 State Championship, the 2007 District 7 Player of the Year, First Team All-City, All-District and All-State. She played with the Toledo Volleyball Club and participated in 5 Junior Olympic National Championships.

=== College ===
Frazier started her collegiate career in 2008 with the University of Alabama Crimson Tide. By her sophomore year, she had a career-high 20 kill game, was named the SEC Offensive Player of the Week on September 21 and Collegiate Volleyball Update National Player of the Week, on September 22. She finished the 2009 season with four double-doubles.

In 2010, Ashley transferred to University of Kentucky and played for coach Craig Skinner as a University of Kentucky Wildcat. She redshirted the 2010 season and picked back up for her 2011 redshirt junior year. In her first playing season at UK, Ashley appeared in all 34 of the team's matches and led with 3.22 kills per set. 25 of those matches included 10 or more kills. In her Senior Year (2012), Ashley served as team captain. During that season, she delivered over 350 kills for her second consecutive year which led to being the 15th player in UK program history with 1,000 career kills. She was the 2011 Second Team All-SEC, 2011 NCAA Regional All-Tournament Team, 2011 CoSIDA Academic All-District Team. She also earned the 2012 Senior CLASS Award All-American, 2012 Senior CLASS Award finalist for Excellence Both On And Off The Court and 2012 CoSIDA Academic All-District Team.

=== International ===
Frazier played with the German club KSC Berlin for the 2013/14 season.

== Clubs ==
- (Germany) KSC Berlin (2013-2014)
- (Spain) CD Iruña Voley (2014 - 2015)
- (Thailand) Supreme Chonburi (2015-2016)
- (Thailand) Bangkok Glass (2016–2017)

== Awards ==
=== Individuals ===
- 2015–16 Women's Volleyball Thailand League "Best Server"
- 2017 Women's Volleyball Thai-Denmark Super League "Best Server"

=== Clubs ===
- 2014-15 Superliga Femenina de Voleibol - Runner-Up, with CD Iruña Voley
- 2015-16 Thailand League - Runner-Up, with Supreme Chonburi VC
- 2016 Thai-Denmark Super League - Runner-Up, with Supreme Chonburi VC
- 2016 Sealect Tuna Championship - Runner-Up, with Bangkok Glass
- 2016 Asian Club Championship - Bronze medal, with Bangkok Glass
- 2016–17 Thailand League - Runner-up, with Bangkok Glass
- 2017 Thai-Denmark Super League - Runner-up, with Bangkok Glass
