= Wanna Buakaew =

Thai volleyball player and coach

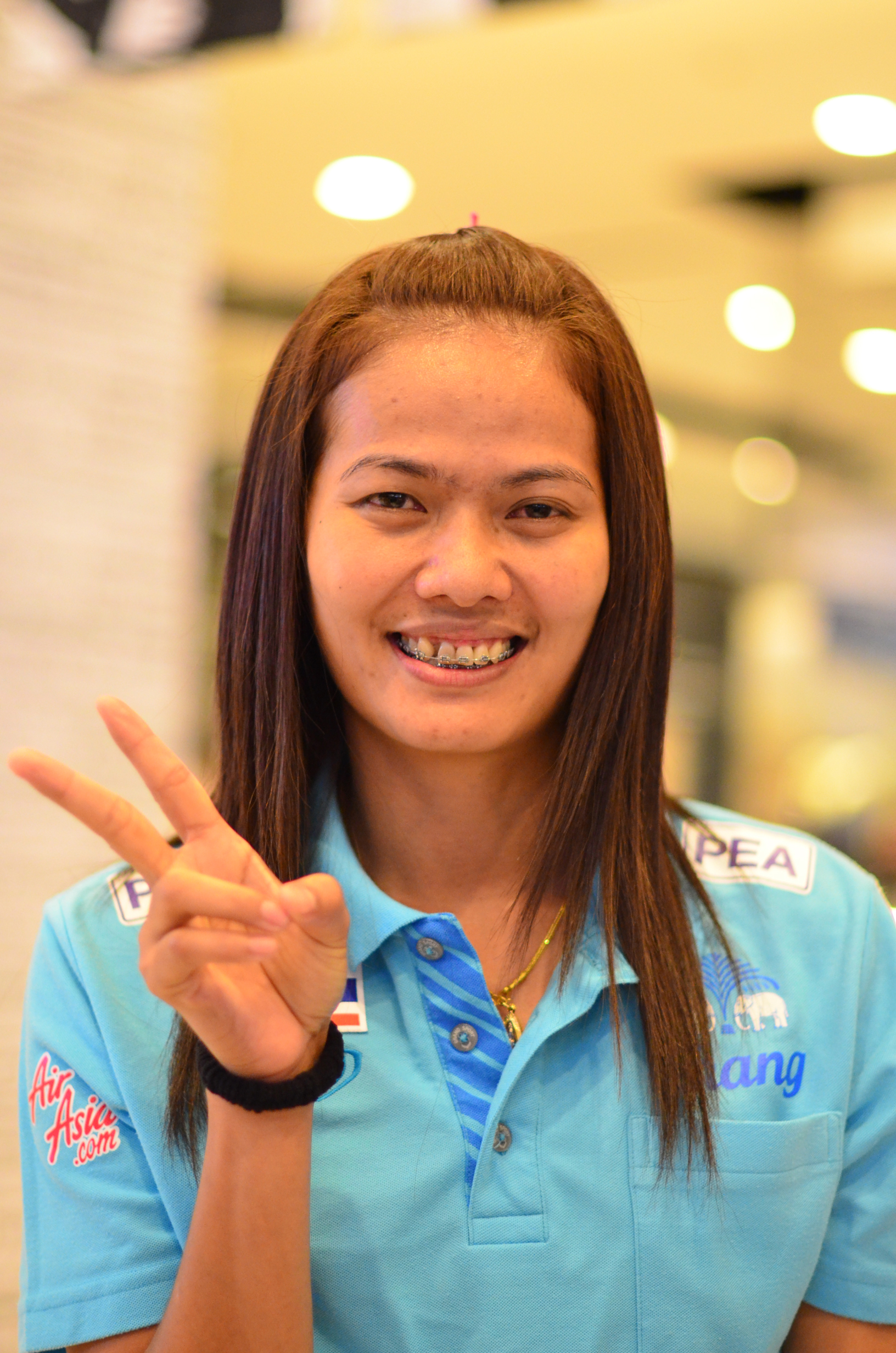

Personal information
- Nickname: Na
- Born: January 2, 1981 (age 45) Sa Kaeo, Thailand
- Height: 1.72 m (5 ft 8 in)
- Weight: 61 kg (134 lb)
- Spike: 292 cm (115 in)
- Block: 277 cm (109 in)

Volleyball information
- Position: Libero

National team
- Years: Team
- 2001–2016: Thailand
Honours
Women's volleyball
Representing Thailand
Summer Universiade
Bronze medal – third place	2001 Beijing	Team
Asian Championship
Gold medal – first place	2009 Hanoi	Team
Gold medal – first place	2013 Nakhon Ratchasima	Team
Bronze medal – third place	2001 Nakhon Ratchasima	Team
Bronze medal – third place	2007 Nakhon Ratchasima	Team
Bronze medal – third place	2015 Tianjin	Team
Asian Cup
Gold medal – first place	2012 Almaty	Team
Bronze medal – third place	2008 Nakhon Ratchasima	Team
Southeast Asian Games
Gold medal – first place	2001 Kuala Lumpur	Team
Gold medal – first place	2003 Hanoi	Team
Gold medal – first place	2005 Manila	Team
Gold medal – first place	2007 Nakhon Ratchasima	Team
Gold medal – first place	2009 Vientiane	Team
Gold medal – first place	2011 Palembang/Jakarta	Team
Gold medal – first place	2013 Naypyidaw	Team
Gold medal – first place	2015 Singapore	Team

Wanna Buakaew (Thai: วรรณา บัวแก้ว; RTGS: Wanna Buakaeo, born January 2, 1981) is a retired Thai volleyball player, and currently coach. She has represented Thailand 44 times in international volleyball competitions.

== Clubs ==
=== As a volleyball player ===
- (Thailand) Pepsi Bangkok (1999–2002)
- (Italy) Johnson Matthey Spezzano (2002–2003)
- (Azerbaijan) Igtisadchi Baku (2009–2010)
- (Thailand) Nong Khai (2010–2011)
- (Thailand) Nakornnonthaburi (2011–2012)
- (Azerbaijan) Igtisadchi Baku (2012–2014)
- (Thailand) Idea Khonkaen (2014–2015)
- (Azerbaijan) Azerrail Baku (2015–2016)
- (Germany) Allianz MTV Stuttgart (2016–2017)
- (Thailand) Bangkok Glass (2017–2018)

=== As a coach ===
- (Thailand) Nakhon Ratchasima (2018–2019)
- (Thailand) Est Cola (2026 PVL Invitational Conference)

== Awards ==
=== Individual ===
- 2007 Asian Club Championship "Best Digger"
- 2007 Asian Championship "Best Digger"
- 2008 Asian Cup Championship "Best Libero"
- 2009 Asian Club Championship "Best Libero"
- 2009 Asian Championship "Best Libero"
- 2009-10 Azerbaijan Super League "Best Receiver"
- 2010–11 Thailand League "Best Digger"
- 2011–12 Thailand League "Most Valuable Player"
- 2011–12 Thailand League "Best Libero"
- 2011–12 Thailand League "Best Receiver"
- 2014–15 Thailand League "Best Libero"

=== Clubs ===
- 2007 Asian Club Championship - Runner-Up, with Sang Som
- 2009 Asian Club Championship - Champion, with Federbrau
- 2011–12 Thailand League - Champion, with Nakornnonthaburi
- 2012 Asian Club Championship - Bronze medal, with Chang
- 2012 Princess's Cup - Champion, with PEA Sisaket
- 2012-13 Azerbaijan Super League - Runner-Up, with Igtisadchi Baku
- 2013 Princess's Cup - Champion, with PEA Sisaket
- 2015–16 Azerbaijan Super League – Champion, with Azerrail Baku
- 2018 Thai-Denmark Super League - Runner-up, with Bangkok Glass

== Royal decorations ==
- 2013 - Commander (Third Class) of The Most Exalted Order of the White Elephant
- 2010 - Commander (Third Class) of The Most Admirable Order of the Direkgunabhorn
