= Sareea Freeman =

American indoor volleyball player

Personal information
- Full name: Sareea Monaye Freeman
- Nationality: American
- Born: October 25, 1991 (age 35); San Jose, California, United States
- Height: 1.91 m (6 ft 3 in)
- Weight: 87 kg (192 lb)
- Spike: 335 cm (132 in)
- Block: 326 cm (128 in)
- Education: Florida State University

Volleyball information
- Position: Opposite
- Current club: Supreme Chonburi-E.Tech
- Number: 22
Honours
Best Middle 2016 Best Opposite 2017 best Offensive Player 2017 All American 2012

Sareea Monaye Freeman (born October 25, 1991) is an American indoor volleyball player.

== Early life ==
She graduated from Florida State University with a bachelor's degree in sociology.

== Career ==
From 2009-12 she played with the Florida State University Seminoles, earning AVCA All-American Honorable Mention in 2012. She also played basketball in 2014 for Florida State. She served as assistant coach for University at Albany volleyball program in 2014.

Freeman won the 2013 Premier Volleyball League silver medal with the club Florida Wave.

She played with the Hungarian club Vasas-Óbuda Budapest for the 2013/14 season, playing the CEV Challenge Cup. Shen then played the 2014 Premier Volleyball League with Florida Wave, losing the championship match to Western Empire.

=== 2015 ===
Freeman played with North Texas in the 2015 Premier Volleyball League season, winning the championship and the inclusion in the all-tournament team. She moved to the Philippines, winning the 2015 Shakey's V-League 12th Season Reinforced Open Conference with PLDT Home Ultera Ultra Fast Hitters.

=== 2016 ===
She signed with the Peruvian League club Regatas Lima, winning the silver medal with that team, after losing 2-3 the final series to Universidad San Martín, winning the 1st Best Middle Blocker individual award. For the 2016 Premier Volleyball League season, she played with the club North Texas, helping them to reach the fifth place. Freeman returned to the Peruvian League with Regatas Lima.

=== 2017 ===
With Regatas Lima, Freeman was awarded Most Valuable Player and Best Opposite Spiker when she guided her club to the 2016/17 Peruvian league Championship over Universidad San Martín. She confessed that she felt that she had a debt with herself and that she felt comfortable with her team and head coach and was looking forward to return in 2018. She won the 2017 USA Open National Championships with Hoosier Exterminators and she was awarded all-tournament team and she praised the team work that help them achieve the winning. She joined the Thailand League club Supreme Chonburi-E.Tech for the 2017–18 season.

== Clubs ==
- (Hungary) Vasas Óbuda Budapest (2013-2014)
- (United States) Florida Wave (2014)
- (United States) North Texas (2015)
- (Philippines) PLDT (2015–2016)
- (United States) North Texas (2016)
- (Peru) Regatas Lima (2016–2017)
- (United States) Hoosier Exterminators (2017)
- (Thailand) Supreme Chonburi (2017–2018)
- (Peru) Regatas Lima (2018)
- (United States) Bring It Promotions (2018)

== Awards ==
=== Individuals ===
- 2015 Premier Volleyball League Championship "All-Tournament team"
- 2015–16 Peruvian League "1st Best Middle Blocker"
- 2016–17 Peruvian League "Most valuable player"
- 2016–17 Peruvian League "Best opposite"
- 2017 USA Open National Championships "All-Tournament team"
- 2017–18 Thailand League "Best opposite spiker"
- 2017–18 Thailand League "Most Valuable Foreign Player"
- 2018 Thai-Denmark Super League "Best spiker"

=== Clubs ===
- 2014 USA Premier Volleyball League – Runner-Up, with Florida Wave
- 2015 USA Premier Volleyball League – Champion, with North Texas
- 2015 Shakey's V-League 12th Season Reinforced Open Conference – Champion, with PLDT Home Ultera Ultra Fast Hitters
- 2015–16 Peruvian League – Runner-Up, with Regatas Lima
- 2016–17 Peruvian League – Champion, with Regatas Lima
- 2017 USA Open National Championships – Champion, with Hoosier Exterminators
- 2017–18 Thailand League - Champion, with Supreme Chonburi
- 2018 Thai-Denmark Super League - Champion, with Supreme Chonburi
