= Bangkok Glass Volleyball Club =

Thai volleyball club

Bangkok Glass บางกอกกล๊าส
- Full name: Bangkok Glass Volleyball Club สโมสรวอลเลย์บอลบางกอกกล๊าส
- Nickname: The Glass Rabbits (กระต่ายแก้ว); BG
- Founded: 2014
- Dissolved: 2018
- Ground: BG Sport Hall; Thanyaburi, Pathum Thani, Thailand (Capacity: 4,000)
- Chairman: (Thailand) Pavin Bhirombhakdi
- Head coach: (Thailand) Padejsuk Wannachote
- League: Thailand League
- 2017–2018: Third place ▼1
- Website: Club home page

Uniforms
Home	Away

Championships
- Asian Champion Thailand League Champion Super League Champion

Bangkok Glass Volleyball Club (Thai: สโมสรวอลเลย์บอลบางกอกกล๊าส) was a Thai professional volleyball club based in Pathum Thani Province and was managed by BG FC Sport Co., Ltd. which was a subsidiary of Bangkok Glass Group of Companies.

Bangkok Glass FC played in the Thailand League after their club was founded in 2014. Their home stadium was BG Sport Hall which has a capacity of 4,000.

Bangkok Glass won their first Thailand League title in 2014–15 season and the Super League in 2015. In season 2014–15, Bangkok Glass were the triple champions winning the (2014–15 Thailand League, 2015 Thailand Super League, and 2015 Asian Club Championship).

The club dissolved on May 8, 2018, due to severe differences between the club's policy and the national federation's policy about the national team, the latter considered to suffocate the professional clubs. The licence was sold to Air Force Volleyball Club Company.

== History ==
Bangkok Glass Volleyball Club (BGVC) managed by BGFC Sport Company Limited, was established in 2014 with the mission to elevate a standard of Thailand’s female volleyball sport industry and to promote and increase a popularity of the volleyball sport among Thais.

BGVC laid the basis for achieving the point of success which can be shown through the team’s integration including management team, professional personnel, and players.

The first tournament in which Bangkok Glass Volleyball Club (BGVC) participated was the Pro Challenge 2014 (Division 1), held in July 2014. The club won the championship, which resulted in promotion to the top tier of competition, the Volleyball Thailand League for the 2014–2015 season. This achievement marked the beginning of the club’s participation at the highest national level.

== Stadium and locations ==
Coordinates	Location	Stadium	Capacity	Year
14°00′02″N 100°40′45″E	Pathumthani	BG Sport Hall	4,000	2014–2018

== Honours ==
=== Domestic competitions ===
Senior team

- Thailand League
  - Champion (2): 2014–15, 2015–16
  - Runner-up (2): 2016–17
  - Third place (1): 2017–18
- Super League
  - Champion (2): 2015, 2016
  - Runner-up (2): 2017, 2018
- Pro Challenge
  - Champion (1): 2014

B team

- Kor Royal Cup
  - Runner-up (2): 2016, 2017

U18 team

- Academy U18 League
  - Third place (2): 2015,2016

=== International competitions ===
Major

- Asian Club Championship 2 appearances
  - 2015 — Champion
  - 2016 — Third place
- World Club Championship 1 appearances
  - 2016 — 7th place

Minor

- Binh Dien International Cup
  - 2017 — Champion

== Former squad ==
As of January 2018

2017–2018 squad
Number	Player	Position	Height (m)	Weight (kg)	Birth date
1	(Thailand) Maliwan Prabnarong	Opposite	1.73	58	27 August 1990 (age 35)
2	(Thailand) Thitapa Tongsidee	Setter	1.73	58	4 January 1996 (age 30)
3	(Thailand) Sutadta Chuewulim	Outside Hitter	1.73	67	19 December 1992 (age 33)
4	(Thailand) Wiravan Sattayanuchit	Outside Hitter	1.77	61	7 April 1993 (age 32)
5	(Thailand) Pleumjit Thinkaow (c)	Middle Blocker	1.80	64	9 November 1983 (age 42)
6	(Thailand) Thidarat Pengwichai	Opposite	1.78	75	28 November 1992 (age 33)
7	(Greece) Anna Maria Spanou	Outside Spiker	1.88	79	18 November 1995 (age 30)
8	(Thailand) Pimpila Muekkhuntod	Outside Hitter	1.70	65	20 November 1996 (age 29)
9	(Thailand) Jarasporn Bundasak	Middle Blocker	1.82	64	1 March 1993 (age 33)
10	(Thailand) Jutarat Montripila	Outside Hitter	1.75	67	2 October 1986 (age 39)
11	(Thailand) Pornpun Guedpard	Setter	1.73	63	5 May 1993 (age 32)
12	(Thailand) Karina Krause	Middle Blocker	1.78	65	12 February 1989 (age 37)
13	(Thailand) Witita Balee	Setter	1.71	56	27 March 1991 (age 34)
14	(Thailand) Rasamee Supamool	Opposite	1.81	65	10 January 1992 (age 34)
15	(Thailand) Tikamporn Changkeaw	Libero	1.68	60	12 December 1984 (age 41)
16	(Thailand) Wanna Buakaew	Libero	1.72	61	2 January 1981 (age 45)
17	(Thailand) Wanida Kotruang	Outside Hitter	1.70	60	29 June 1990 (age 35)
21	(Thailand) Amporn Hyapha	Middle Blocker	1.80	70	19 May 1985 (age 40)

== Notable players ==
Domestic Players

Thailand

- Wilavan Apinyapong (loan)
- Natthanicha Jaisaen
- Anongporn Promrat
- Paweenut Rueangrum
- Pattrathip Santrakoon

Foreign Players

Japan

- Naoko Hashimoto (2015)

Serbia

- Aleksandra Terzić (2015)

United States

- Ashley Frazier (2016–2017)
- Jordanne Scott (2016)

Vietnam

- Tran Thi Thanh Thuy (2015–2016)
- Nguyen Thi Ngoc Hoa (2014–2017)

Czech Republic

- Soňa Mikysková (2017)

Greece

- Anna Maria Spanou (2017–2018)
