= 2015 Asian Women's Club Volleyball Championship =

2015 Asian Women's Club Championship

Tournament details
- Host country: Vietnam
- Dates: 12–20 September
- Teams: 9
- Venue: 1

Final positions
- Champions: (Thailand) Bangkok Glass (1st title)

Tournament awards
- MVP: (Thailand) Pleumjit Thinkaow

The 2015 Asian Women's Club Volleyball Championship was the 16th staging of the AVC Club Championships. The tournament was held in Vietnam.

Matches of the competition was held at the 7,000 capacity Hà Nam Gymnasium.

== Pools composition ==
- The teams are seeded based on their final ranking at the 2014 Asian Women's Club Volleyball Championship

| Pool A | Pool B |
|---|---|
| Vietnam (Host); Kazakhstan (3rd); Thailand; ~~Turkmenistan~~ * Chinese Taipei | Japan (1st); China (2nd); Iran; Philippines; North Korea |

* Withdrew

== Pool standing procedure ==
The following procedures shall be followed to determine the ranking of teams in a pool:

1. Number of matches won
2. Match points
3. Sets ratio
4. Points ratio
5. Result of the last match between the tied teams

Match won 3–0 or 3–1: 3 match points for the winner, 0 match points for the loser
Match won 3–2: 2 match points for the winner, 1 match point for the loser

== Preliminary round ==
=== Pool A ===
| Pos | Team | Pld | W | L | Pts | SW | SL | SR | SPW | SPL | SPR | Qualification |
|---|---|---|---|---|---|---|---|---|---|---|---|---|
| 1 | (Chinese Taipei) Taiwan Power | 3 | 3 | 0 | 8 | 9 | 3 | 3.000 | 272 | 239 | 1.138 | Quarterfinals |
| 2 | (Thailand) Bangkok Glass | 3 | 2 | 1 | 7 | 8 | 3 | 2.667 | 251 | 216 | 1.162 | Quarterfinals |
| 3 | (Kazakhstan) Zhetyssu Almaty | 3 | 1 | 2 | 3 | 3 | 7 | 0.429 | 215 | 235 | 0.915 | Quarterfinals |
| 4 | (Vietnam) Thông tin LienVietPostBank | 3 | 0 | 3 | 0 | 2 | 9 | 0.222 | 216 | 264 | 0.818 | Quarterfinals |

| Date | Time | | Score | | Set 1 | Set 2 | Set 3 | Set 4 | Set 5 | Total | Report |
|---|---|---|---|---|---|---|---|---|---|---|---|
| 12 Sep | 19:00 | Thông tin LVPB (Vietnam) | 1–3 | (Chinese Taipei) Taiwan Power | 26–28 | 19–25 | 25–17 | 14–25 | | 84–95 | Report |
| 12 Sep | 21:00 | Zhetyssu Almaty (Kazakhstan) | 0–3 | (Thailand) Bangkok Glass | 23–25 | 22–25 | 22–25 | | | 67–75 | Report |
| 13 Sep | 18:00 | Taiwan Power (Chinese Taipei) | 3–0 | (Kazakhstan) Zhetyssu Almaty | 25–19 | 25–14 | 25–21 | | | 75–54 | Report |
| 14 Sep | 18:00 | Bangkok Glass (Thailand) | 2–3 | (Chinese Taipei) Taiwan Power | 25–17 | 25–20 | 16–25 | 23–25 | 12–15 | 101–102 | Report |
| 15 Sep | 16:00 | Thông tin LVPB (Vietnam) | 1–3 | (Kazakhstan) Zhetyssu Almaty | 17–25 | 25–19 | 22–25 | 21–25 | | 85–94 | Report |
| 16 Sep | 20:00 | Thông tin LVPB (Vietnam) | 0–3 | (Thailand) Bangkok Glass | 12–25 | 14–25 | 22–25 | | | 48–75 | Report |

=== Pool B ===
| Pos | Team | Pld | W | L | Pts | SW | SL | SR | SPW | SPL | SPR | Qualification |
|---|---|---|---|---|---|---|---|---|---|---|---|---|
| 1 | (China) Zhejiang | 4 | 4 | 0 | 11 | 12 | 2 | 6.000 | 328 | 243 | 1.350 | Quarterfinals |
| 2 | (Japan) Hisamitsu Springs | 4 | 3 | 1 | 10 | 11 | 3 | 3.667 | 330 | 207 | 1.594 | Quarterfinals |
| 3 | (North Korea) April 25 | 4 | 2 | 2 | 6 | 6 | 6 | 1.000 | 242 | 245 | 0.988 | Quarterfinals |
| 4 | (Philippines) Petron Blaze | 4 | 1 | 3 | 3 | 3 | 9 | 0.333 | 199 | 272 | 0.732 | Quarterfinals |
| 5 | (Iran) Azad University | 4 | 0 | 4 | 0 | 0 | 12 | 0.000 | 168 | 300 | 0.560 | |

| Date | Time | | Score | | Set 1 | Set 2 | Set 3 | Set 4 | Set 5 | Total | Report |
|---|---|---|---|---|---|---|---|---|---|---|---|
| 12 Sep | 14:00 | Zhejiang (China) | 3–0 | (Iran) Azad University | 25–7 | 25–10 | 25–17 | | | 75–34 | Report |
| 12 Sep | 16:00 | April 25 (North Korea) | 3–0 | (Philippines) Petron Blaze | 25–13 | 25–18 | 25–11 | | | 75–42 | Report |
| 13 Sep | 16:00 | Azad University (Iran) | 0–3 | (North Korea) April 25 | 13–25 | 22–25 | 18–25 | | | 53–75 | Report |
| 13 Sep | 20:00 | Hisamitsu Springs (Japan) | 2–3 | (China) Zhejiang | 25–22 | 21–25 | 25–16 | 23–25 | 11–15 | 105–103 | Report |
| 14 Sep | 16:00 | April 25 (North Korea) | 0–3 | (Japan) Hisamitsu Springs | 10–25 | 15–25 | 12–25 | | | 37–75 | Report |
| 14 Sep | 20:00 | Petron Blaze (Philippines) | 3–0 | (Iran) Azad University | 25–8 | 25–16 | 25–23 | | | 75–47 | Report |
| 15 Sep | 18:00 | Zhejiang (China) | 3–0 | (North Korea) April 25 | 25–15 | 25–18 | 25–22 | | | 75–55 | Report |
| 15 Sep | 20:00 | Hisamitsu Springs (Japan) | 3–0 | (Philippines) Petron Blaze | 25–5 | 25–16 | 25–12 | | | 75–33 | Report |
| 16 Sep | 16:00 | Azad University (Iran) | 0–3 | (Japan) Hisamitsu Springs | 13–25 | 6–25 | 15–25 | | | 34–75 | Report |
| 16 Sep | 18:00 | Petron Blaze (Philippines) | 0–3 | (China) Zhejiang | 15–25 | 14–25 | 20–25 | | | 49–75 | Report |

== Final round ==
Quarterfinals
18 Sep – Hà Nam
(Chinese Taipei) Taiwan Power | 3
(Philippines) Petron Blaze | 0
18 Sep – Hà Nam
(Japan) Hisamitsu Springs | 3
(Kazakhstan) Zhetyssu Almaty | 0
18 Sep – Hà Nam
(China) Zhejiang | 3
(Vietnam) Thông tin LVPB | 0
18 Sep – Hà Nam
(Thailand) Bangkok Glass | 3
(North Korea) April 25 | 1

Semifinals
19 Sep – Hà Nam
(Chinese Taipei) Taiwan Power | 2
(Japan) Hisamitsu Springs | 3
19 Sep – Hà Nam
(China) Zhejiang | 2
(Thailand) Bangkok Glass | 3

Final
20 Sep – Hà Nam
(Japan) Hisamitsu Springs | 2
(Thailand) Bangkok Glass | 3
3rd place
20 Sep – Hà Nam
(Chinese Taipei) Taiwan Power | 0
(China) Zhejiang | 3

5th–8th places
19 Sep – Hà Nam
(Philippines) Petron Blaze | 0
(Kazakhstan) Zhetyssu Almaty | 3
19 Sep – Hà Nam
(Vietnam) Thông tin LVPB | 0
(North Korea) April 25 | 3

5th place
20 Sep – Hà Nam
(Kazakhstan) Zhetyssu Almaty | 3
(North Korea) April 25 | 0
7th place
20 Sep – Hà Nam
(Philippines) Petron Blaze | 1
(Vietnam) Thông tin LVPB | 3

=== Quarterfinals ===
| Date | Time | | Score | | Set 1 | Set 2 | Set 3 | Set 4 | Set 5 | Total | Report |
|---|---|---|---|---|---|---|---|---|---|---|---|
| 18 Sep | 14:00 | Taiwan Power (Chinese Taipei) | 3–0 | (Philippines) Petron Blaze | 25–20 | 25–16 | 25–9 | | | 75–45 | Report |
| 18 Sep | 16:00 | Bangkok Glass (Thailand) | 3–1 | (North Korea) April 25 | 25–18 | 25–15 | 22–25 | 25–23 | | 97–81 | Report |
| 18 Sep | 18:00 | Hisamitsu Springs (Japan) | 3–0 | (Kazakhstan) Zhetyssu Almaty | 25–18 | 25–20 | 25–23 | | | 75–61 | Report |
| 18 Sep | 20:00 | Zhejiang (China) | 3–0 | (Vietnam) Thông tin LVPB | 25–16 | 25–15 | 25–12 | | | 75–43 | Report |

=== 5th–8th semifinals ===
| Date | Time | | Score | | Set 1 | Set 2 | Set 3 | Set 4 | Set 5 | Total | Report |
|---|---|---|---|---|---|---|---|---|---|---|---|
| 19 Sep | 14:00 | Petron Blaze (Philippines) | 0–3 | (Kazakhstan) Zhetyssu Almaty | 17–25 | 18–25 | 20–25 | | | 55–75 | Report |
| 19 Sep | 18:00 | Thông tin LVPB (Vietnam) | 0–3 | (North Korea) April 25 | 22–25 | 21–25 | 21–25 | | | 64–75 | Report |

=== Semifinals ===
| Date | Time | | Score | | Set 1 | Set 2 | Set 3 | Set 4 | Set 5 | Total | Report |
|---|---|---|---|---|---|---|---|---|---|---|---|
| 19 Sep | 16:00 | Zhejiang (China) | 2–3 | (Thailand) Bangkok Glass | 14–25 | 25–17 | 23–25 | 25–19 | 9–15 | 96–101 | Report |
| 19 Sep | 20:00 | Taiwan Power (Chinese Taipei) | 2–3 | (Japan) Hisamitsu Springs | 25–23 | 28–26 | 10–25 | 11–25 | 4–15 | 78–114 | Report |

=== 7th place ===
| Date | Time | | Score | | Set 1 | Set 2 | Set 3 | Set 4 | Set 5 | Total | Report |
|---|---|---|---|---|---|---|---|---|---|---|---|
| 20 Sep | 14:00 | Petron Blaze (Philippines) | 1–3 | (Vietnam) Thông tin LVPB | 24–26 | 25–27 | 26–24 | 20–25 | | 95–102 | Report |

=== 5th place ===
| Date | Time | | Score | | Set 1 | Set 2 | Set 3 | Set 4 | Set 5 | Total | Report |
|---|---|---|---|---|---|---|---|---|---|---|---|
| 20 Sep | 16:00 | Zhetyssu Almaty (Kazakhstan) | 3–0 | (North Korea) April 25 | 25–18 | 25–19 | 25–22 | | | 75–59 | Report |

=== 3rd place ===
| Date | Time | | Score | | Set 1 | Set 2 | Set 3 | Set 4 | Set 5 | Total | Report |
|---|---|---|---|---|---|---|---|---|---|---|---|
| 20 Sep | 18:00 | Taiwan Power (Chinese Taipei) | 0–3 | (China) Zhejiang | 14–25 | 15–25 | 15–25 | | | 44–75 | Report |

=== Final ===
| Date | Time | | Score | | Set 1 | Set 2 | Set 3 | Set 4 | Set 5 | Total | Report |
|---|---|---|---|---|---|---|---|---|---|---|---|
| 20 Sep | 20:00 | Hisamitsu Springs (Japan) | 2–3 | (Thailand) Bangkok Glass | 22–25 | 25–20 | 25–23 | 22–25 | 12–15 | 106–108 | Report |

== Final standing ==
| Rank | Team |
|---|---|
| 1st place, gold medalist(s) | (Thailand) Bangkok Glass |
| 2nd place, silver medalist(s) | (Japan) Hisamitsu Springs |
| 3rd place, bronze medalist(s) | (China) Zhejiang |
| 4 | (Chinese Taipei) Taiwan Power |
| 5 | (Kazakhstan) Zhetysu Almaty |
| 6 | (North Korea) April 25 |
| 7 | (Vietnam) Thông tin LienVietPostBank |
| 8 | (Philippines) Petron Blaze |
| 9 | (Iran) Azad University |

| Qualified for the 2016 Club World Championship |

2015 Asian Women's Club Champions

1st title

Team roster
Maliwan Prabnarong, Sutadta Chuewulim, Pleumjit Thinkaow (c), Jutarat Montripila, Pornpun Guedpard, Karina Krause, Witita Balee, Rasamee Supamool, Tikamporn Changkeaw, Wanida Kotruang, Nguyễn Thị Ngọc Hoa, Wilavan Apinyapong
Head coach
Kittipong Pornchartyingcheep

== Awards ==
- Most Valuable Player

(Thailand) Pleumjit Thinkaow (Bangkok Glass)

- Best Setter

(Thailand) Pornpun Guedpard (Bangkok Glass)

- Best Outside Spikers

(Japan) Miyu Nagaoka (Hisamitsu Springs)
(Japan) Risa Shinnabe (Hisamitsu Springs)

- Best Middle Blockers

(Vietnam) Nguyễn Thị Ngọc Hoa (Bangkok Glass)
(China) Yang Zhou (Zhejiang)

- Best Opposite Spiker

(Chinese Taipei) Chen Wan-Ting (Taiwan Power)

- Best Libero

(Thailand) Tikamporn Changkeaw (Bangkok Glass)
