= Anna Maria Spanou =

Greek volleyball player (born 1995)

Personal information
- Nickname: Anna
- Nationality: Greek
- Born: 18 November 1995 (age 30); Chalkida, Greece
- Height: 1.88 m (6 ft 2 in)
- Weight: 76 kg (168 lb)

Volleyball information
- Position: Outside Spiker
- Number: 7

Career
Teams
	(Thailand) Bangkok Glass V.C.(2017-2018)

Anna Maria Spanou (born 18 November 1995) is a Greek volleyball player. She has played in AEK Athens, GS. Ilioupoli Athens, Greece Barcelona, Spain, the Bangkok Glass team, Quimper Volley 29 and from 2019 has played for GEN-I Volley, Nova Gorica, Slovenia.

Spanou also competes in beach volleyball.
