= 2016–17 Women's Volleyball Thailand League =

- League: Thailand League
- Duration: October 29, 2016 – March, 2017
- Number of games: 56 (Regular Season)
- Number of teams: 8
- Season champions: Supreme Chonburi-E.Tech (1st title)
- Season MVP: (Thailand) Ajcharaporn Kongyot (Supreme Chonburi)
- Finals champions: Supreme Chonburi-E.Tech
- Runners-up: Bangkok Glass

Women's Volleyball Thailand League seasons
- ← 2015–16 2017–18 →

The 2016–17 Women's Volleyball Thailand League was the 12th season of the Thai League, the top Thai professional league for association volleyball clubs, since its establishment in 2005. A total of 8 teams competed in the league. The season started on 29 October 2016.

Bangkok Glass are the defending champions, having won the Volleyball Thailand League title the previous season.

== Teams ==
Locations of the 2016–2017 Volleyball Thailand League teams
Volleyball clubs in Greater Bangkok

=== Stadiums and locations ===
2016–17 Women's Volleyball Thailand League locations
Team	Based	Stadium	Capacity
Bangkok Glass	Pathum Thani	BG Sport Hall	9,700
King-Bangkok	Bangkok	Pracha Niwet Sport Center	6,800
Supreme Chonburi-E.Tech	Chonburi	ChonBuri Municipality Sport Stadium	8,700
3BB Nakornnont	Nonthaburi	King Rama IX Stadium	8,200
Thai-Denmark Nongrua	Khon Kaen	Khon Kaen University Gymnasium	5,780
Khonkaen Star	Khon Kaen	Khon Kaen Provincial Gymnasium	8,430
Nakhon Ratchasima The Mall	Nakhon Ratchasima	The Mall Nakhon Ratchasima Arena	5,100
Rangsit University	Pathum Thani	Rangsit University Gymnasium	4,300

=== Name changes ===
- Idea Khonkaen renamed themselves to Khonkaen Star.

=== Personnel and sponsoring ===
2016–17 Women's Volleyball Thailand League personnel and sponsoring
Team	Head coach	Team captain	Colors	Kit manufacturer	Main Sponsor
Bangkok Glass	(Thailand) Kittipong Pornchartyingcheep	(Thailand) Pleumjit Thinkaow		Grand Sport	Singha
King-Bangkok	(Thailand) Rakpong Janjaroen	(Thailand) Waraporn Poomjarern		Kela	King rice bran oil
Supreme Chonburi-E.Tech	(Thailand) Nataphon Srisamutnak	(Thailand) Wilavan Apinyapong		Mizuno	Supreme
3BB Nakornnont	(Thailand) Thanakit Inleang	(Thailand) Tichaya Boonlert		Grand Sport	3BB internet
Thai-Denmark Nongrua	(Thailand) Banjong Sombat	(Thailand) Patcharee Sangmuang		Grand Sport	Thai-Danish milk
Khonkaen Star	(Thailand) Sunton Poeseetha	(Thailand) Kittiyakorn Phansamdaeng		Grand Sport	Cho-Thavee
Nakhon Ratchasima The Mall	(Thailand) Chamnan Dokmai	(Thailand) Hattaya Bamrungsuk		Mizuno	The Mall
Rangsit University	(Thailand) Sanong Kullachim	(Thailand) Sunantha Songsai		Grand Sport	Rangsit University

=== Foreign players and Domestic Players ===
2016–17 Women's Volleyball Thailand League foreign players
Team	Player 1	Player 2
Bangkok Glass	(United States) Ashley Frazier	(Vietnam) Nguyen Thi Ngoc Hoa
King-Bangkok
Supreme Chonburi-E.Tech	(United States) Chloe Mann	(Senegal) Fatou Diouck
3BB Nakornnont	(Philippines) Alyssa Valdez	
Thai-Denmark Nongrua		
Khonkaen Star		
Nakhon Ratchasima The Mall		
Rangsit University		

== Tournament format ==
- First round: single round-robin.
- Second round: single round-robin.

=== Season standing procedure ===
1. Number of matches won
2. Match points
3. Sets ratio
4. Points ratio
5. Result of the last match between the tied teams

Match won 3–0 or 3–1: 3 match points for the winner, 0 match points for the loser
Match won 3–2: 2 match points for the winner, 1 match point for the loser

== Regular season ==
=== League table ===
Pos	Team	Pld	W	L	Pts	SW	SL	SR	SPW	SPL	SPR	Qualification or relegation
1	(Thailand) Supreme Chonburi-E.Tech	13	13	0	37	39	6	6.500	1097	889	1.234	Asian Championship
2	(Thailand) Bangkok Glass	13	11	2	34	35	8	4.375	1044	820	1.273	
3	(Thailand) Nakhon Ratchasima The Mall	13	9	4	27	31	16	1.938	1096	1012	1.083	
4	(Thailand) 3BB Nakornnont	13	7	6	22	25	18	1.389	965	918	1.051	
5	(Thailand) Khonkaen Star	13	6	7	18	21	22	0.955	970	956	1.015	
6	(Thailand) King-Bangkok	13	4	9	11	12	29	0.414	873	924	0.945	
7	(Thailand) Thai-Denmark Nongrua	13	2	11	6	6	35	0.171	751	983	0.764	Relegated to Division 2
8	(Thailand) Rangsit University	13	0	13	1	4	39	0.103	753	1047	0.719	Relegated to Division 2

=== Result table ===
Home \ Away	BGK	KBK	SUP	NKN	NRA	KKS	NAK	RSU
Bangkok Glass		3–0	2–3	3–0	3–0	3–1	3–1	3–0
King-Bangkok			0–3	0–3	3–0	0–3	0–3	3–2
Supreme Chonburi-E.Tech	3–0	3–0		3–1	3–0	3–0	3–2	3–0
3BB Nakornnont	0–3	3–0	1–3		3–0	3–0		3–0
Thai-Denmark Nongrua	0–3	0–3		0–3		0–3	0–3	3–1
Khonkaen Star	0–3	3–0	0–3	3–1	3–0		1–3	3–0
Nakhon Ratchasima The Mall	0–3	3–0	1–3	3–2	3–0	3–1		3–0
Rangsit University	0–3	0–3	0–3	0–3	1–3		0–3	

Updated to match(es) played on 19 March 2017. Source:
Legend: Blue = home team win; Yellow = draw; Red = away team win.

== Results ==
=== First round ===
Date	Time		Score		Set 1	Set 2	Set 3	Set 4	Set 5	Total	Report
19 Nov	16:00	Thai-Denmark Nongrua	0–3	Khonkaen Star	18–25	18–25	19–25			55–75	
19 Nov	19:00	Rangsit University	0–3	Bangkok Glass	13–25	12–25	19–25			44–75	
19 Nov	19:00	King-Bangkok	0–3	Nakhon Ratchasima The Mall	26–28	21–25	21–25			68–78	
20 Nov	19:00	3BB Nakornnont	1–3	Supreme Chonburi-E.Tech	23–25	25–18	17–25	20–25		85–93	

Date	Time		Score		Set 1	Set 2	Set 3	Set 4	Set 5	Total	Report
26 Nov	16:00	Khonkaen Star	1–3	Nakhon Ratchasima The Mall	20–25	27–25	20–25	22–25		89–100	
26 Nov	19:00	Supreme Chonburi-E.Tech	3–0	Bangkok Glass	26–24	25–21	25–19			76–64	
27 Nov	19:00	Rangsit University	0–3	3BB Nakornnont	9–25	20–25	19–25			48–75	
27 Nov	19:00	King-Bangkok	3–0	Thai-Denmark Nongrua	25–14	25–11	25–16			75–41	

Date	Time		Score		Set 1	Set 2	Set 3	Set 4	Set 5	Total	Report
3 Dec	16:00	Supreme Chonburi-E.Tech	3–0	Thai-Denmark Nongrua	25–16	25–15	25–10			75–41	
3 Dec	19:00	Nakhon Ratchasima The Mall	3–2	3BB Nakornnont	23–25	20–25	25–17	25–20	15–12	108–99	
4 Dec	16:00	Khonkaen Star	3–0	Rangsit University	25–20	25–19	25–15			75–54	
4 Dec	16:00	Bangkok Glass	3–0	King-Bangkok	25–19	25–22	25–22			75–63	

Date	Time		Score		Set 1	Set 2	Set 3	Set 4	Set 5	Total	Report
10 Dec	16:00	Supreme Chonburi-E.Tech	3–0	King-Bangkok	25–21	25–19	25–14			75–54	
10 Dec	19:00	Nakhon Ratchasima The Mall	3–0	Rangsit University	25–18	25–19	25–16			75–53	
10 Dec	19:00	3BB Nakornnont	3–0	Khonkaen Star	29–27	25–16	26–24			80–67	
11 Dec	19:00	Thai-Denmark Nongrua	0–3	Bangkok Glass	19–25	11–25	20–25			50–75	

Date	Time		Score		Set 1	Set 2	Set 3	Set 4	Set 5	Total	Report
17 Dec	16:00	Khonkaen Star	0–3	Supreme Chonburi-E.Tech	21–25	24–26	21–25			66–76	
17 Dec	19:00	Bangkok Glass	3–1	Nakhon Ratchasima The Mall	25–20	21–25	25–21	25–15		96–81	
21 Dec	19:00	Rangsit University	0–3	King-Bangkok	14–25	21–25	14–25			49–75	
21 Dec	16:00	3BB Nakornnont	3–0	Thai-Denmark Nongrua	27–25	25–19	25–15			77–59	

Date	Time		Score		Set 1	Set 2	Set 3	Set 4	Set 5	Total	Report
24 Dec	16:00	Thai-Denmark Nongrua	0–3	Nakhon Ratchasima The Mall	21–25	17–25	21–25			59–75	
24 Dec	16:00	Supreme Chonburi-E.Tech	3–0	Rangsit University	25–10	25–23	25–17			75–50	
25 Dec	19:00	King-Bangkok	0–3	Khonkaen Star	26–28	18–25	20–25			64–78	
25 Dec	16:00	Bangkok Glass	3–0	3BB Nakornnont	25–12	25–17	25–22			75–51	

Date	Time		Score		Set 1	Set 2	Set 3	Set 4	Set 5	Total	Report
7 Jan	19:00	3BB Nakornnont	3–0	King-Bangkok	25–13	25–22	25–16			75–51	
7 Jan	19:00	Nakhon Ratchasima The Mall	1–3	Supreme Chonburi-E.Tech	25–22	25–27	26–28	17–25		93–102	
8 Jan	19:00	Rangsit University	1–3	Thai-Denmark Nongrua	14–25	25–15	14–25	22–25		75–90	
8 Jan	16:00	Bangkok Glass	3–1	Khonkaen Star	25–20	25–15	25–27	25–19		100–81	

=== Second round ===
Date	Time		Score		Set 1	Set 2	Set 3	Set 4	Set 5	Total	Report
22 Jan	15:30	Nakhon Ratchasima The Mall	0–3	Bangkok Glass	19–25	20–25	20–25			59–75	
22 Jan	15:30	Supreme Chonburi-E.Tech	3–0	Khonkaen Star	25–18	25–19	25–20			75–57	

Date	Time		Score		Set 1	Set 2	Set 3	Set 4	Set 5	Total	Report
28 Jan	15:30	Supreme Chonburi-E.Tech	3–2	Nakhon Ratchasima The Mall	25–19	22–25	24–26	25-22	15-10	111–70	
28 Jan	15:30	Khonkaen Star	0–3	Bangkok Glass	16–25	20–25	20–25			56–75	
29 Jan	15:30	Thai-Denmark Nongrua	3–1	Rangsit University	25–14	25–18	21–25	25-21		96–57	
29 Jan	15:30	King-Bangkok	0–3	3BB Nakornnont	24–26	20–25	23–25			67–76	

Date	Time		Score		Set 1	Set 2	Set 3	Set 4	Set 5	Total	Report
4 Feb	15:30	3BB Nakornnont	0–3	Bangkok Glass	19–25	19–25	20–25			58–75	
4 Feb	15:30	Rangsit University	0–3	Supreme Chonburi-E.Tech	13–25	17–25	19–25			49–75	
5 Feb	15:30	Khonkaen Star	3–0	King-Bangkok	25–18	25–22	25–14			75–54	
5 Feb	15:30	Nakhon Ratchasima The Mall	3–0	Thai-Denmark Nongrua	25–22	25–20	25–19			75–61	

Date	Time		Score		Set 1	Set 2	Set 3	Set 4	Set 5	Total	Report
11 Feb	15:30	Bangkok Glass	3–0	Rangsit University	25–15	25–13	25–16			75–44	
11 Feb	18:30	Nakhon Ratchasima The Mall	3–0	King-Bangkok	26–24	25–11	25–16			76–51	
12 Feb	15:30	Khonkaen Star	3–0	Thai-Denmark Nongrua	25–17	25–11	25–11			75–39	
13 Feb	15:30	3BB Nakornnont	0–3	Supreme Chonburi-E.Tech	16–25	21–25	21–25			58–75	

Date	Time		Score		Set 1	Set 2	Set 3	Set 4	Set 5	Total	Report
18 Feb	15:30	Nakhon Ratchasima The Mall	3–1	Khonkaen Star	25–20	25–16	23–25	25–21		98–82	
18 Feb	15:30	Thai-Denmark Nongrua	0–3	King-Bangkok	13–25	25–27	18–25			56–77	
18 Feb	15:30	3BB Nakornnont	3–0	Rangsit University	25–14	25–21	25–15			75–50	
19 Feb	15:30	Bangkok Glass	2–3	Supreme Chonburi-E.Tech	26–28	22–25	25–23	25–22	11–15	109–113	

Date	Time		Score		Set 1	Set 2	Set 3	Set 4	Set 5	Total	Report
4 Mar	15:30	Khonkaen Star	3–1	3BB Nakornnont	27–25	25–15	15–25	25-19		92–65	
4 Mar	15:30	Bangkok Glass	3–0	Thai-Denmark Nongrua	25–15	25–15	25–16			75–46	
5 Mar	15:30	King-Bangkok	3–2	Rangsit University	25–17	25–18	21–25	24-26	15-8	110–60	

Date	Time		Score		Set 1	Set 2	Set 3	Set 4	Set 5	Total	Report
11 Mar	15:30	Rangsit University	0–3	Nakhon Ratchasima The Mall	24–26	22–25	18–25			64–76	
11 Mar	15:30	Thai-Denmark Nongrua	0–3	3BB Nakornnont	19–25	22–25	17–25			58–75	
12 Mar	15:30	King-Bangkok	0–3	Supreme Chonburi-E.Tech	23–25	15–25	23–25			61–75	

Date	Time		Score		Set 1	Set 2	Set 3	Set 4	Set 5	Total	Report
18 Mar	15:30	3BB Nakornnont	1–3	Nakhon Ratchasima The Mall	25–17	26–28	21–25	20–25		92–95	
19 Mar	18:30	King-Bangkok	0–3	Bangkok Glass	23–25	21–25	30–32			74–82	
19 Mar	15:30	Rangsit University	0–3	Khonkaen Star	16–25	15–25	17–25			48–75	
19 Mar	15:30	Thai-Denmark Nongrua	0–3	Supreme Chonburi-E.Tech	21–25	15–25	14–25			50–75	

== Final standing ==
Rank	Team
1st place, gold medalist(s)	Supreme Chonburi-E.Tech
2nd place, silver medalist(s)	Bangkok Glass
3rd place, bronze medalist(s)	Nakhon Ratchasima The Mall
4	3BB Nakornnont
5	Khonkaen Star
6	King-Bangkok
7	Thai-Denmark Nongrua
8	Rangsit University

Qualified for the Asian Championship and Super League
Qualified for the Super League
Relegated to Division 2

2016–17 Women's Volleyball Thailand League
Supreme Chonburi-E.Tech
1st title

Team roster
Supattra Pairoj, Piyanut Pannoy, Wipawee Srithong, Sasiwimon Sangpan, Chamaiporn Phokha, Patcharaporn Sittisad, Tirawan Sang-ob, Bualee Jaroensri, Wilavan Apinyapong (c), Nampueng Kamart, Soraya Phomla, Chloe Mann, Parinya Pankaew, Watchareeya Nualjam, Ajcharaporn Kongyot, Fatou Diouck, Thipvimon Pookongnam, Rattanaporn Sanuanram
Head coach
Nataphon Srisamutnak

== Awards ==
- Most valuable player
  (Thailand) Ajcharaporn Kongyot (Supreme Chonburi)
- Best opposite spiker
  (Senegal) Fatou Diouck (Supreme Chonburi)
- Best outside spikers
  (Thailand) Ajcharaporn Kongyot (Supreme Chonburi)
  (Thailand) Wilavan Apinyapong (Supreme Chonburi)
- Best middle blockers
  (Thailand) Thatdao Nuekjang (Khonkaen Star)
  (Thailand) Pleumjit Thinkaow (Bangkok Glass)
- Best setter
  (Thailand) Soraya Phomla (Supreme Chonburi)
- Best libero
  (Thailand) Supattra Pairoj (Supreme Chonburi)

== See also ==
- 2016–17 Men's Volleyball Thailand League
