= 2016 Sealect Tuna Women's Volleyball Championship =

Tournament details
- Host country: Sisaket, Thailand
- Dates: 24 – 28 August 2016
- Teams: 8
- Venue: 1 (in 1 host city)

Final positions
- Champions: (Thailand) PEA Sisaket (5th title)

The 2016 Sealect Tuna Women's Volleyball Championship (Thai: วอลเลย์บอลซีเล็คทูน่า ประชาชนหญิง ถ้วย ก. 2559), officially known as the 2016 Annual H.R.H. Princess Maha Chakri Sirindhorn's Cup Volleyball Tournament, was a national volleyball competition. It was organized by the Thailand Volleyball Association or the TVA. The tournament was held at Weesommai Gymnasium in Sisaket.

== Participant teams ==
- (Thailand) Bangkok Glass VC
- (Thailand) Idea Khonkaen
- (Thailand) Kasetsart University
- (Thailand) PEA Sisaket
- (Philippines) Foton Tornadoes
- (Thailand) Rangsit University
- (Thailand) Rattana Bundit University
- (Thailand) 3BB Nakhonnont

== Pools composition ==
Pool A	Pool B
(Thailand) Bangkok Glass VC	(Thailand) Rattana Bundit University
(Thailand) PEA Sisaket	(Thailand) Kasetsart University
(Thailand) Rattana Bundit University (RBAC)	(Thailand) 3BB Nakhonnont
(Philippines) Foton Tornadoes	(Thailand) Idea Khonkaen

== Venue ==
Final Round
Preliminary Round
Sisaket, Thailand
Weesommai Gymnasium
Capacity: 5,000

== Preliminary round ==
- All times are Indochina Time (UTC+07:00).

=== Pool A ===
Pos	Team	Pld	W	L	Pts	SW	SL	SR	SPW	SPL	SPR	Qualification
1	(Thailand) PEA Sisaket	3	3	0	9	9	0	MAX	225	120	1.875	Semifinals
2	(Thailand) Bangkok Glass VC	3	2	1	6	6	4	1.500	217	205	1.059	Semifinals
3	(Philippines) Foton Tornadoes	3	1	2	3	4	6	0.667	201	232	0.866	5th–8th classification
4	(Thailand) Rangsit University	3	0	3	0	0	9	0.000	142	225	0.631	5th–8th classification

Date	Time		Score		Set 1	Set 2	Set 3	Set 4	Set 5	Total	Report
24 Aug	14.30	Bangkok Glass VC (Thailand)	3–0	(Thailand) Rangsit University	25–13	25–15	25–20			75–48	–
24 Aug	17.00	PEA Sisaket (Thailand)	3–0	(Philippines) Foton Tornadoes	25–13	25–10	25–18			75–41	–
25 Aug	11.30	Bangkok Glass VC (Thailand)	3–1	(Philippines) Foton Tornadoes	25–20	25–22	20–25	25–18		95–85	–
25 Aug	17.00	PEA Sisaket (Thailand)	3–0	(Thailand) Rangsit University	25–13	25–8	25–11			75–32	–
26 Aug	11.30	Rangsit University (Thailand)	0–3	(Philippines) Foton Tornadoes	23–25	19–25	20–25			62–75	–
26 Aug	14.30	Bangkok Glass VC (Thailand)	0–3	(Thailand) PEA Sisaket	16–25	12–25	19–25			47–75	–

=== Pool B ===
Pos	Team	Pld	W	L	Pts	SW	SL	SR	SPW	SPL	SPR	Qualification
1	(Thailand) Idea Khonkaen	3	3	0	9	9	0	MAX	230	162	1.420	Semifinals
2	(Thailand) Rattana Bundit University	3	2	1	6	6	5	1.200	247	244	1.012	Semifinals
3	(Thailand) 3BB Nakhonnont	3	1	2	3	4	7	0.571	242	248	0.976	5th–8th classification
4	(Thailand) Kasetsart University	3	0	3	0	2	9	0.222	199	264	0.754	5th–8th classification

Date	Time		Score		Set 1	Set 2	Set 3	Set 4	Set 5	Total	Report
24 Aug	12.00	3BB Nakhonnont (Thailand)	0–3	(Thailand) Idea Khonkaen	28–30	17–25	13–25			58–80	–
24 Aug	18.30	Rattana Bundit University (Thailand)	3–1	(Thailand) Kasetsart University	25–18	25–18	18–25	25–20		93–81	–
25 Aug	10.00	Kasetsart University (Thailand)	0–3	(Thailand) Idea Khonkaen	17–25	22–25	10–25			49–75	–
25 Aug	14.30	3BB Nakhonnont (Thailand)	1–3	(Thailand) Rattana Bundit University	25–27	24–26	25–21	14–25		88–99	–
26 Aug	10.00	3BB Nakhonnont (Thailand)	3–1	(Thailand) Kasetsart University	25–15	21–25	25–16	25–13		96–69	–
26 Aug	17.00	Idea Khonkaen (Thailand)	3–0	(Thailand) Rattana Bundit University	25–23	25–18	25–14			75–55	–

== Final round ==
- All times are Indochina Time (UTC+07:00).

=== Classification 5th–8th ===
13th–15th places
27 August
(Philippines) Foton Tornadoes	3
(Thailand) Kasetsart University	1
27 August
(Thailand) Rangsit University	1
(Thailand) 3BB Nakhonnont	3

5th place
28 August
(Philippines) Foton Tornadoes	1
(Thailand) 3BB Nakhonnont	3
7th place
28 August
(Thailand) Kasetsart University	3
(Thailand) Rangsit University	1

==== 5th–8th semifinal ====
Date	Time		Score		Set 1	Set 2	Set 3	Set 4	Set 5	Total	Report
27 Aug	08:00	Foton Tornadoes (Philippines)	3–1	(Thailand) Kasetsart University	17–25	25–12	25–23	25–16		92–76	–
27 Aug	09:30	Rangsit University (Thailand)	1–3	(Thailand) 3BB Nakhonnont	25–27	14–25	25–21	24–26		88–99	–

==== 7th place ====
Date	Time		Score		Set 1	Set 2	Set 3	Set 4	Set 5	Total	Report
28 Aug	08:00	Kasetsart University (Thailand)	3–1	(Thailand) Rangsit University	28–26	25–18	24–26	25–21		102–91	–

==== 5th place ====
Date	Time		Score		Set 1	Set 2	Set 3	Set 4	Set 5	Total	Report
28 Aug	09:30	Foton Tornadoes (Philippines)	1–3	(Thailand) 3BB Nakhonnont	25–19	19–25	24–26	14–25		82–95	–

=== Final four ===
Semifinals
27 August
(Thailand) Bangkok Glass VC	3
(Thailand) Idea Khonkaen	1
27 August
(Thailand) PEA Sisaket	3
(Thailand) Rattana Bundit University	0

Final
28 August
(Thailand) Bangkok Glass VC	0
(Thailand) PEA Sisaket	3
3rd place
28 August
(Thailand) Idea Khonkaen	3
(Thailand) Rattana Bundit University	2

==== Semifinals ====
Date	Time		Score		Set 1	Set 2	Set 3	Set 4	Set 5	Total	Report
27 Aug	12:30	Bangkok Glass VC (Thailand)	3–1	(Thailand) Idea Khonkaen	23–25	25–19	26–24	25–17		99–85	–
27 Aug	15:00	PEA Sisaket (Thailand)	3–0	(Thailand) Rattana Bundit University	25–15	25–16	25–22			75–53	–

==== 3rd place ====
Date	Time		Score		Set 1	Set 2	Set 3	Set 4	Set 5	Total	Report
28 Aug	12:30	Idea Khonkaen (Thailand)	3–2	(Thailand) Rattana Bundit University	25–23	19–25	26–24	20–25	19–17	109–114	–

==== Final ====
Date	Time		Score		Set 1	Set 2	Set 3	Set 4	Set 5	Total	Report
28 Aug	15:00	Bangkok Glass VC (Thailand)	0–3	(Thailand) PEA Sisaket	17–25	14–25	18–25			49–75	–

== Final standing ==
Rank	Team
1st place, gold medalist(s)	(Thailand) PEA Sisaket
2nd place, silver medalist(s)	(Thailand) Bangkok Glass
3rd place, bronze medalist(s)	(Thailand) Idea Khonkaen
4	(Thailand) Rattana Bundit University
5	(Thailand) 3BB Nakhonnont
6	(Philippines) Foton Tornadoes
7	(Thailand) Kasetsart University
8	(Thailand) Rangsit University

2016 Sealect Tuna Women's Volleyball Championship

5th title
