= 2014–15 Women's Volleyball Thailand League =

- League: Thailand League
- Sport: Volleyball
- Duration: October 25, 2014 – March 22, 2015
- Games: 56 (Regular Season)
- Teams: 8
- Season champions: Bangkok Glass (1st title)
- Season MVP: (Thailand) Pleumjit Thinkaow

Women's Volleyball Thailand League seasons
- ← 2013–14 2015–16 →

The Women's Volleyball Thailand League is the highest level of Thailand club volleyball in the 2014–15 season and the 10th edition.

== Teams ==
- Ayutthaya A.T.C.C
- Bangkok
- Bangkok Glass
- Idea Khonkaen
- Nakhonnont 3BB
- Nakhon Ratchasima
- Sisaket
- Supreme Chonburi

== Regular season ==
=== Ranking ===
Pos	Team	Pld	W	L	Pts	SW	SL	SR	SPW	SPL	SPR
1	Bangkok Glass	14	12	2	36	39	11	3.545	1185	968	1.224
2	Ayutthaya A.T.C.C	14	10	4	29	32	18	1.778	1161	1080	1.075
3	Idea Khonkaen	14	9	5	26	34	23	1.478	1285	1255	1.024
4	Nakhonnont 3BB	14	8	6	23	30	25	1.200	1220	1252	0.974
5	Nakhon Ratchasima	14	7	7	23	29	27	1.074	1237	1254	0.986
6	Supreme Chonburi	14	7	7	19	22	29	0.759	1144	1184	0.966
7	Sisaket	14	2	12	7	14	39	0.359	1072	1253	0.856
8	Bangkok	14	1	13	5	11	39	0.282	1026	1184	0.867

=== Round 1 ===
Date		Score		Set 1	Set 2	Set 3	Set 4	Set 5	Total
25 Oct	Nakhon Ratchasima	3–1	Bangkok	25–23	25–21	17–25	25–15		92–84
25 Oct	Idea Khonkaen	3–1	Bangkok Glass	28–26	25–22	20–25	26–24		99–97
26 Oct	Supreme Chonburi	3–0	Sisaket	25–20	25–19	25–18			75–57
1 Nov	Nakhon Ratchasima	2–3	Bangkok Glass	17–25	25–23	25–17	17–25	10–15	94–105
1 Nov	Nakhonnont 3BB	3–0	Ayutthaya A.T.C.C	25–21	25–21	25–16			75–58
2 Nov	Supreme Chonburi	3–1	Bangkok	25–19	24–26	25–20	25–20		99–85
8 Nov	Bangkok Glass	3–0	Supreme Chonburi	26–24	25–18	25–11			76–53
8 Nov	Nakhonnont 3BB	2–3	Idea Khonkaen	23–25	25–19	22–25	25–22	12–15	107–106
9 Nov	Nakhon Ratchasima	3–1	Sisaket	25–21	25–27	25–18	25–18		100–84
16 Nov	Ayutthaya A.T.C.C	0–3	Bangkok Glass	15–25	16–25	23–25			54–75
16 Nov	Sisaket	2–3	Nakhonnont 3BB	22-25	19-25	25-22	25-18	12-15	103-105
16 Nov	Idea Khonkaen	1–3	Supreme Chonburi	23–25	25–20	19–25	22–25		89–95
22 Nov	Sisaket	0–3	Bangkok Glass	18–25	13–25	20–25			52–75
23 Nov	Ayutthaya A.T.C.C	3–0	Supreme Chonburi	25-22	25-21	27-25			77-68
23 Nov	Bangkok	0–3	Idea Khonkaen	23-25	21-25	21-25			65-75
30 Nov	Bangkok	0–3	Nakhonnont 3BB	16–25	20–25	21–25			57–75
30 Nov	Ayutthaya A.T.C.C	3–0	Sisaket	32–30	25–20	25–17			82–67
30 Nov	Nakhon Ratchasima	2–3	Idea Khonkaen	26–24	15–25	23–25	25–19	12–15	101–108
5 Dec	Bangkok	2–3	Ayutthaya A.T.C.C	27–25	22–25	25–14	25–27	13–15	112–106
5 Dec	Sisaket	1–3	IIdea Khonkaen	19–25	25–23	24–26	22–25		90–99
6 Dec	Supreme Chonburi	3–2	Nakhon Ratchasima	19–25	20–25	31–29	25–23	15–9	110–111
6 Dec	Bangkok Glass	3-1	Nakhonnont 3BB	25–21	16–25	25–22	25–14		91–82
20 Dec	Bangkok Glass	3–0	Bangkok	25-11	25-10	25-22			75-43
21 Dec	Ayutthaya A.T.C.C	3–0	Nakhon Ratchasima	25-12	25-18	25-17			75-47
21 Dec	Supreme Chonburi	1–3	Nakhonnont 3BB	22-25	26-24	20-25	22-25		90-99
27 Dec	Bangkok	1–3	Sisaket	22-25	25-18	20-25	16-25		83-93
28 Dec	Idea Khonkaen	2–3	Ayutthaya A.T.C.C	16-25	20-25	25-22	27-25	8-15	96-112
28 Dec	Nakhonnont 3BB	2–3	Nakhon Ratchasima	25-15	23-25	21-25	25-10	8-15	102-90

=== Round 2 ===
Date		Score		Set 1	Set 2	Set 3	Set 4	Set 5	Total
25 Jan	Sisaket	1–3	Supreme Chonburi	24-26	18-25	31-29	18-25		91-105
25 Jan	Bangkok	0–3	Nakhon Ratchasima	23-25	21-25	22-25			66-75
25 Jan	Bangkok Glass	3–1	Idea Khonkaen	22-25	25-20	25-23	25-18		97-86
28 Jan	Ayutthaya A.T.C.C	3–0	Nakhonnont 3BB	25-16	25-23	25-20			75-59
31 Jan	Bangkok	3–0	Supreme Chonburi	25-17	28-26	25-22			78-65
1 Feb	Idea Khonkaen	3–0	Nakhonnont 3BB	25-19	27-25	25-21			77-65
1 Feb	Bangkok Glass	3–0	Nakhon Ratchasima	28-26	25-13	25-19			78-58
7 Feb	Nakhonnont 3BB	3–2	Sisaket	23-25	25-18	22-25	25-20	15-10	110-98
8 Feb	Idea Khonkaen	1–3	Nakhon Ratchasima	27-25	22-25	25-27	26-28		100-105
8 Feb	Supreme Chonburi	0–3	Bangkok Glass	19-25	14-25	15-25			48-75
11 Feb	Ayutthaya A.T.C.C	3–0	Bangkok	25-23	25-16	30-28			80-67
14 Feb	Nakhonnont 3BB	3–0	Bangkok	25-18	25-16	25-17			75-51
15 Feb	Supreme Chonburi	3–2	Idea Khonkaen	23-25	25-16	25-22	22-25	15-10	110-98
15 Feb	Bangkok Glass	3–0	Ayutthaya A.T.C.C	25-19	25-23	25-19			75-61
21 Feb	Nakhon Ratchasima	1–3	Supreme Chonburi	20-25	25-23	22-25	31-33		98-106
22 Feb	Bangkok Glass	3–0	Sisaket	25-12	25-17	25-18			75-47
22 Feb	Ayutthaya A.T.C.C	2–3	Idea Khonkaen	18-25	25-19	19-25	25-14	17-19	104-102
28 Feb	Nakhon Ratchasima	1–3	Ayutthaya A.T.C.C	30-32	20-25	25-23	17-25		92-105
28 Feb	Bangkok	1–3	Bangkok Glass	16-25	22-25	25-18	18-25		81-93
1 Mar	Idea Khonkaen	3–0	Sisaket	25-12	25-21	25-17			75-50
1 Mar	Nakhonnont 3BB	3–0	Supreme Chonburi	25-23	25-19	25-17			75-59
7 Mar	Nakhonnont 3BB	3–2	Bangkok Glass	28-26	23-25	25-9	19-25	15-13	110-98
8 Mar	Sisaket	1–3	Ayutthaya A.T.C.C	16-25	25-22	20-25	23-25		84-97
14 Mar	Idea Khonkaen	3–0	Bangkok	25-17	25-18	25-22			75-57
15 Mar	Supreme Chonburi	0–3	Ayutthaya A.T.C.C	22-25	18-25	21-25			61-75
15 Mar	Sisaket	0–3	Nakhon Ratchasima	14-25	17-25	19-25			50-75
21 Mar	Nakhon Ratchasima	3–1	Nakhonnont 3BB	24-26	25-20	25-16	25-19		99-81
22 Mar	Sisaket	3–2	Bangkok	25-23	23-25	18-25	25-13	15-11	106-97

== Final standing ==
Rank	Team
1st place, gold medalist(s)	Bangkok Glass
2nd place, silver medalist(s)	Ayutthaya A.T.C.C
3rd place, bronze medalist(s)	Idea Khonkaen
4	Nakhonnont 3BB
5	Nakhon Ratchasima
6	Supreme Chonburi
7	Sisaket
8	Bangkok

Qualified for the 2015 Asian Club Championship and 2015 Thai-Denmark Super League

Qualified for the 2015 Thai-Denmark Super League
Relegated to Group 2

== Awards ==
Award	Winner	Team
MVP	(Thailand) Pleumjit Thinkaow	Bangkok Glass
Best scorer	(Thailand) Wilawan Apinyapong	Nakhon Ratchasima
Best outside spikers	(Thailand) Ajcharaporn Kongyot	Supreme Choburi
Best outside spikers	(Thailand) Wilawan Apinyapong	Nakhon Ratchasima
Best opposite spiker	(Thailand) Em-orn Phanusit	Idea Khonkaen
Best middle blockers	(Thailand) Rattanaporn Sanuanram	Bangkok
Best middle blockers	(Thailand) Pleumjit Thinkaow	Bangkok Glass
Best setter	(Thailand) Tichaya Boonlert	Nakhonnont 3BB
Best libero	(Thailand) Wanna Buakaew	Idea Khonkaen
