= 2016 FIVB Volleyball Women's Club World Championship =

2016 Women's Club World Championship

Tournament details
- Host country: Philippines
- City: Pasay
- Dates: 18–23 October
- Teams: 8 (from 3 confederations)
- Venue: 1 (in 1 host city)

Final positions
- Champions: (Turkey) Eczacıbaşı VitrA (2nd title)
- Runners-up: (Italy) Pomì Casalmaggiore
- Third place: (Turkey) Vakıfbank İstanbul
- Fourth place: (Switzerland) Voléro Zürich

Tournament awards
- MVP: (Serbia) Tijana Bošković
- Best Setter: (United States) Carli Lloyd
- Best OH: (China) Zhu Ting (Russia) Tatiana Kosheleva
- Best MB: (United States) Foluke Akinradewo (Serbia) Milena Rašić
- Best OPP: (Serbia) Tijana Bošković
- Best Libero: (Brazil) Fabiana de Oliveira

Tournament statistics
- Matches played: 20
- Attendance: 34,065 (1,703 per match)

The 2016 FIVB Women's Club World Championship was the 10th edition of the event. It was held for the first time in the Philippines, on 18–23 October 2016 at the SM Mall of Asia Arena. For the first time, eight teams competed, including four wild cards.

The Philippine Super Liga and Eventcourt was in charge of organizing the tournament, together with the Larong Volleyball sa Pilipinas, Inc. (LVPI), the national federation for volleyball.

Turkey's Eczacıbaşı VitrA defeated Italy's Pomì Casalmaggiore in the final to become the first team in history to claim the title a second time after their 2015 success. Vakıfbank İstanbul defeated Voléro Zürich in the bronze medal match. Serbian Tijana Bošković from Eczacıbaşı was elected the Most Valuable Player.

== Qualification ==
Team	Qualified as
(Philippines) PSL-F2 Logistics Manila	Hosts
(Italy) Pomì Casalmaggiore	2016 European Champions
(Thailand) Bangkok Glass	2015 Asian Champions
(Brazil) Rexona-Sesc Rio	2016 South American Champions
(Turkey) Eczacıbaşı VitrA	Wild Card
(Switzerland) Voléro Zürich	Wild Card
(Turkey) Vakıfbank İstanbul	Wild Card
(Japan) Hisamitsu Springs	Wild Card

== Pools composition ==
Pool A	Pool B
(Italy) Pomì Casalmaggiore	(Thailand) Bangkok Glass
(Brazil) Rexona-Sesc Rio	(Turkey) Vakıfbank İstanbul
(Turkey) Eczacıbaşı VitrA	(Switzerland) Voléro Zürich
(Philippines) PSL-F2 Logistics Manila	(Japan) Hisamitsu Springs

== Venue ==
All rounds
Pasay, Philippines
Mall of Asia Arena
Capacity: 20,000

== Pool standing procedure ==
1. Number of matches won
2. Match points
3. Sets ratio
4. Points ratio
5. Result of the last match between the tied teams

Match won 3–0 or 3–1: 3 match points for the winner, 0 match points for the loser
Match won 3–2: 2 match points for the winner, 1 match point for the loser

== Preliminary round ==
- All times are Philippines Standard Time (UTC+08:00).

=== Pool A ===
Pos	Team	Pld	W	L	Pts	SW	SL	SR	SPW	SPL	SPR	Qualification
1	(Turkey) Eczacıbaşı VitrA	3	3	0	8	9	3	3.000	285	223	1.278	Semifinals
2	(Italy) Pomì Casalmaggiore	3	2	1	5	6	5	1.200	229	236	0.970	Semifinals
3	(Brazil) Rexona-Sesc Rio	3	1	2	5	7	6	1.167	281	264	1.064	Classification 5th-8th
4	(Philippines) PSL-F2 Logistics Manila	3	0	3	0	1	9	0.111	176	248	0.710	Classification 5th-8th

Date	Time		Score		Set 1	Set 2	Set 3	Set 4	Set 5	Total	Report
18 Oct	16:30	Pomì Casalmaggiore (Italy)	0–3	(Turkey) Eczacıbaşı VitrA	17–25	18–25	15–25			50–75	P2 P3
18 Oct	19:30	PSL-F2 Logistics Manila (Philippines)	0–3	(Brazil) Rexona-Sesc Rio	15–25	13–25	20–25			48–75	P2 P3
19 Oct	19:30	Pomì Casalmaggiore (Italy)	3–2	(Brazil) Rexona-Sesc Rio	17–25	25–20	25–20	19–25	18–16	104–106	P2 P3
20 Oct	13:00	Rexona-Sesc Rio (Brazil)	2–3	(Turkey) Eczacıbaşı VitrA	27–25	19–25	25–22	18–25	11–15	100–112	P2 P3
20 Oct	19:30	PSL-F2 Logistics Manila (Philippines)	0–3	(Italy) Pomì Casalmaggiore	19–25	15–25	21–25			55–75	P2 P3
21 Oct	19:00	PSL-F2 Logistics Manila (Philippines)	1–3	(Turkey) Eczacıbaşı VitrA	17–25	17–25	25–23	14–25		73–98	P2 P3

=== Pool B ===
Pos	Team	Pld	W	L	Pts	SW	SL	SR	SPW	SPL	SPR	Qualification
1	(Switzerland) Voléro Zürich	3	3	0	8	9	2	4.500	246	225	1.093	Semifinals
2	(Turkey) Vakıfbank İstanbul	3	2	1	7	8	4	2.000	290	235	1.234	Semifinals
3	(Japan) Hisamitsu Springs	3	1	2	3	4	6	0.667	205	231	0.887	Classification 5th-8th
4	(Thailand) Bangkok Glass	3	0	3	0	0	9	0.000	175	225	0.778	Classification 5th-8th

Date	Time		Score		Set 1	Set 2	Set 3	Set 4	Set 5	Total	Report
18 Oct	10:00	Vakıfbank İstanbul (Turkey)	3–1	(Japan) Hisamitsu Springs	25–15	25–15	29–31	25–18		104–79	P2 P3
18 Oct	13:00	Voléro Zürich (Switzerland)	3–0	(Thailand) Bangkok Glass	25–21	25–19	25–23			75–63	P2 P3
19 Oct	16:30	Voléro Zürich (Switzerland)	3–0	(Japan) Hisamitsu Springs	25–19	25–15	25–17			75–51	P2 P3
20 Oct	10:00	Bangkok Glass (Thailand)	0–3	(Japan) Hisamitsu Springs	14–25	18–25	20–25			52–75	P2 P3
20 Oct	16:30	Voléro Zürich (Switzerland)	3–2	(Turkey) Vakıfbank İstanbul	25–22	27–25	16–25	12–25	16–14	96–111	P2 P3
21 Oct	16:00	Vakıfbank İstanbul (Turkey)	3–0	(Thailand) Bangkok Glass	25–19	25–23	25–18			75–60	P2 P3

== Classification 5th-8th ==
- All times are Philippine Standard Time (UTC+08:00).

Classification 5th-8th
22 October
(Brazil) Rexona-Sesc Rio	3
(Thailand) Bangkok Glass	0
22 October
(Japan) Hisamitsu Springs	3
(Philippines) PSL-F2 Logistics Manila	0

5th place match
23 October
(Brazil) Rexona-Sesc Rio	3
(Japan) Hisamitsu Springs	2
7th place match
23 October
(Thailand) Bangkok Glass	3
(Philippines) PSL-F2 Logistics Manila	0

=== Classification 5th-8th ===
Date	Time		Score		Set 1	Set 2	Set 3	Set 4	Set 5	Total	Report
22 Oct	10:00	Rexona-Sesc Rio (Brazil)	3–0	(Thailand) Bangkok Glass	25–19	25–15	25–20			75–54	P2 P3
22 Oct	16:30	Hisamitsu Springs (Japan)	3–0	(Philippines) PSL-F2 Logistics Manila	25–15	25–18	25–21			75–54	P2 P3

=== 7th place ===
Date	Time		Score		Set 1	Set 2	Set 3	Set 4	Set 5	Total	Report
23 Oct	16:00	Bangkok Glass (Thailand)	3–0	(Philippines) PSL-F2 Logistics Manila	25–16	25–23	25–20			75–59	P2 P3

=== 5th place ===
Date	Time		Score		Set 1	Set 2	Set 3	Set 4	Set 5	Total	Report
23 Oct	10:00	Rexona-Sesc Rio (Brazil)	3–2	(Japan) Hisamitsu Springs	20–25	25–22	25–15	30–32	15–7	115–101	P2 P3

== Final round ==
- All times are Philippine Standard Time (UTC+08:00).

Semifinals
22 October
(Turkey) Eczacıbaşı	3
(Turkey) Vakıfbank	1
22 October
(Switzerland) Voléro Zürich	1
(Italy) Casalmaggiore	3

Final
23 October
(Turkey) Eczacıbaşı	3
(Italy) Casalmaggiore	2
3rd place match
24 October
(Turkey) Vakıfbank	3
(Switzerland) Voléro Zürich	1

=== Semifinals ===
Date	Time		Score		Set 1	Set 2	Set 3	Set 4	Set 5	Total	Report
22 Oct	13:00	Eczacıbaşı VitrA (Turkey)	3–1	(Turkey) Vakıfbank İstanbul	25–23	19–25	25–17	25–23		94–88	P2 P3
22 Oct	19:30	Voléro Zürich (Switzerland)	1–3	(Italy) Pomì Casalmaggiore	27–25	23–25	17–25	23–25		90–100	P2 P3

=== 3rd place match ===
Date	Time		Score		Set 1	Set 2	Set 3	Set 4	Set 5	Total	Report
23 Oct	13:00	Vakıfbank İstanbul (Turkey)	3–1	(Switzerland) Voléro Zürich	25–14	21–25	25–22	25–11		96–72	P2 P3

=== Final ===
Date	Time		Score		Set 1	Set 2	Set 3	Set 4	Set 5	Total	Report
23 Oct	19:00	Eczacıbaşı VitrA (Turkey)	3–2	(Italy) Pomì Casalmaggiore	25–19	20–25	25–19	22–25	15–11	107–99	P2 P3

== Final standing ==
Rank	Team
1st place, gold medalist(s)	(Turkey) Eczacıbaşı VitrA
2nd place, silver medalist(s)	(Italy) Pomì Casalmaggiore
3rd place, bronze medalist(s)	(Turkey) Vakıfbank İstanbul
4	(Switzerland) Voléro Zürich
5	(Brazil) Rexona-Sesc Rio
6	(Japan) Hisamitsu Springs
7	(Thailand) Bangkok Glass
8	(Philippines) PSL-F2 Logistics Manila

2016 Women's Club World Champions

2nd title

14–player roster
Gizem Aşçı, Gülden Kayalar Kuzubaşıoğlu, Tijana Bošković, Simge Aköz, Thaísa Menezes, Hande Baladın, Rachael Adams, Büşra Cansu, Jordan Larson, Nilay Özdemir, Gözde Yılmaz, Tatiana Kosheleva, Ceylan Arısan, Neslihan Demir (c), Maja Ognjenović
Head coach
Massimo Barbolini

== Awards ==
- Most valuable player
  (Serbia) Tijana Bošković (Eczacıbaşı VitrA)
- Best setter
  (United States) Carli Lloyd (Pomì Casalmaggiore)
- Best outside hitters
  (China) Zhu Ting (Vakıfbank İstanbul)
  (Russia) Tatiana Kosheleva (Eczacıbaşı VitrA)
- Best middle blockers
  (United States) Foluke Akinradewo (Voléro Zürich)
  (Serbia) Milena Rašić (Vakıfbank İstanbul)
- Best opposite spiker
  (Serbia) Tijana Bošković (Eczacıbaşı VitrA)
- Best libero

(Brazil) Fabiana de Oliveira (Rexona-Sesc Rio)

== See also ==
- 2016 FIVB Volleyball Men's Club World Championship
