= 2015–16 Women's Volleyball Thailand League =

- League: Thailand League
- Sport: Indoor Volleyball
- Duration: October 10, 2015 – March 13, 2016
- Games: 56 (Regular Season)
- Teams: 8
- Season champions: Bangkok Glass (2nd title)
- Season MVP: (Thailand) Pleumjit Thinkaow

Women's Volleyball Thailand League seasons
- ← 2014–15 2016–17 →

The 2015–16 Women's Volleyball Thailand League was the 11th edition of the highest level of Thai club volleyball.

== Team ==
- Bangkok Glass
- King-Bangkok
- Supreme Chonburi E-Tech
- 3BB Nakhonnont
- Thai-Denmark Nongrua
- Idea Khonkaen
- Nakhon Ratchasima
- Cosmo-Chiang Rai

== Regular season ==
=== Ranking ===
Pos	Team	Pld	W	L	Pts	SW	SL	SR	SPW	SPL	SPR
1	Bangkok Glass	14	14	0	40	42	5	8.400	1151	876	1.314
2	Supreme Chonburi	14	9	5	29	33	15	2.200	1149	969	1.186
3	Nakhon Ratchasima	14	9	5	27	32	21	1.524	1203	1124	1.070
4	Idea Khonkaen	14	9	5	27	29	21	1.381	1151	1065	1.081
5	3BB Nakhonnont	14	9	5	25	31	24	1.292	1227	1140	1.076
6	King-Bangkok	14	4	10	14	18	30	0.600	977	1070	0.913
7	Thai-Denmark Nongrua	14	2	12	5	8	38	0.211	864	1092	0.791
8	Cosmo-Chiang Rai	14	0	14	1	3	42	0.071	731	1100	0.665

=== Round 1 ===
Date		Score		Set 1	Set 2	Set 3	Set 4	Set 5	Total
10 Oct	Nakhon Ratchasima	3–1	Supreme Chonburi E-Tech	15–25	25–23	25–23	25–19		90–90
10 Oct	Maejo Cosmo-Chiang Rai	0–3	Thai-Denmark Nongrua	16–25	22–25	19–25			57–75
11 Oct	King-Bangkok	0–3	Bangkok Glass	19–25	13–25	19–25			51–75
11 Oct	3BB Nakhonnont	1–3	Idea Khonkaen	25–18	18–25	21–25	28–30		92–98
17 Oct	Supreme Chonburi E-Tech	3–0	3BB Nakornnont	25–22	25–20	25–17			75–59
17 Oct	Nakhon Ratchasima	1–3	Idea Khonkaen	30–32	20–25	25–23	19–25		94–105
18 Oct	King-Bangkok	3–0	Thai-Denmark Nongrua	25–18	25–19	25–18			75–55
18 Oct	Bangkok Glass	3–0	Maejo Cosmo-Chiang Rai	25–10	25–22	25–18	–		75–50
23 Oct	3BB Nakhonnont	2–3	Bangkok Glass	17–25	25–23	25–22	13–25	12–15	92–110
24 Oct	Idea Khonkaen	3–1	King-Bangkok	25–19	20–25	25–19	25–16		95–79
24 Oct	Supreme Chonburi E-Tech	3–0	Maejo Cosmo-Chiang Rai	25–16	25–16	25–16			75–48
25 Oct	Thai-Denmark Nongrua	0–3	Nakhon Ratchasima	16–25	18–25	19–25			53–75
31 Oct	Bangkok Glass	3–0	Nakhon Ratchasima	25–18	25–18	25–18			75–54
1 Nov	Supreme Chonburi E-Tech	3–0	King-Bangkok	25–16	25–18	25–22			75–59
1 Nov	Thai-Denmark Nongrua	1–3	3BB Nakhonnont	13–25	25–21	16–25	16–25		70–96
15 Nov	Maejo Cosmo-Chiang Rai	0–3	Idea Khonkaen	23–25	14–25	18–25			55–75
21 Nov	Supreme Chonburi E-Tech	3–0	Idea Khonkaen	25–23	26–24	25–21			76–68
21 Nov	Thai-Denmark Nongrua	0–3	Bangkok Glass	12–25	18–25	21–25			51–75
22 Nov	Maejo Cosmo-Chiang Rai	0–3	King-Bangkok	14–25	20–25	21–25			55–75
22 Nov	Nakhon Ratchasima	2–3	3BB Nakhonnont	23–25	23–25	25–21	25–20	12–15	108–106
28 Nov	Nakhon Ratchasima	3–0	Maejo Cosmo-Chiang Rai	25–12	25–18	25–12			75–42
28 Nov	Idea Khonkaen	3–0	Thai-Denmark Nongrua	25–21	25–18	25–19			75–58
29 Nov	King-Bangkok	2–3	3BB Nakhonnont	18–25	21–25	26–24	25–14	12–15	102–103
29 Nov	Bangkok Glass	3–2	Supreme Chonburi E-Tech	32–34	25–22	25–17	20–25	15–13	117–112
5 Dec	Thai-Denmark Nongrua	0–3	Supreme Chonburi E-Tech	17–25	16–25	14–25			47–75
6 Dec	3BB Nakhonnont	3–0	Maejo Cosmo-Chiang Rai	25–16	25–15	25–14			75–45
7 Dec	King-Bangkok	0–3	Nakhon Ratchasima	23–25	19–25	17–25			59–75
7 Dec	Idea Khonkaen	0–3	Bangkok Glass	19–25	23–25	19–25			61–75

=== Round 2 ===
Date		Score		Set 1	Set 2	Set 3	Set 4	Set 5	Total
23 Jan	Thai-Denmark Nongrua	3–2	Cosmo-Chiang Rai	25–17	25–21	23–25	15–25	15–9	103–97
23 Jan	Supreme Chonburi E-Tech	1–3	Nakhon Ratchasima	22–25	25–20	23–25	22–25		92–95
24 Jan	Idea Khonkaen	3–1	3BB Nakhonnont	25–12	19–25	25–22	25–23		94–82
24 Jan	Bangkok Glass	3–0	King-Bangkok	25–16	25–18	25–18			75–52
30 Jan	Idea Khonkaen	2–3	Nakhon Ratchasima	24–26	25–13	25–23	20–25	11–15	106–102
30 Jan	Cosmo-Chiang Rai	0–3	Bangkok Glass	12–25	14–25	14–25			40–75
31 Jan	Thai-Denmark Nongrua	0–3	King-Bangkok	18–25	16–25	22–25			67–75
2 Feb	3BB Nakhonnont	3–2	Supreme Chonburi	25–22	20–25	26–24	20–25	15–12	106–109
6 Feb	Bangkok Glass	3–0	3BB Nakhonnont	25–14	27–25	25–23			77–62
6 Feb	Nakhon Ratchasima	3–1	Thai-Denmark Nongrua	25–13	17–25	25–20	25–13		92–71
7 Feb	Cosmo-Chiang Rai	0–3	Supreme Chonburi E-Tech	13–25	16–25	15–25			44–75
7 Feb	King-Bangkok	2–3	Idea Khonkaen	13–25	22–25	25–20	31–29	13–15	104–114
13 Feb	Nakhon Ratchasima	1–3	Bangkok Glass	16–25	19–25	25–20	23–25		83–95
13 Feb	3BB Nakhonnont	3–0	Thai-Denmark Nongrua	25–20	25–19	25–19			75–58
14 Feb	Idea Khonkaen	3–0	Cosmo-Chiang Rai	25–11	25–22	25–11			75–44
14 Feb	King-Bangkok	0–3	Supreme Chonburi E-Tech	13–25	16–25	18–25			47–75
20 Feb	3BB Nakhonnont	3–1	Nakhon Ratchasima	25–21	24–26	25–22	25–20		99–89
20 Feb	Bangkok Glass	3–0	Thai-Denmark Nongrua	25–22	25–8	25–16			75–46
21 Feb	Idea Khonkaen	0–3	Supreme Chonburi E-Tech	19–25	18–25	22–25			59–75
21 Feb	King-Bangkok	3–0	Cosmo-Chiang Rai	25–13	25–18	25–13			75–44
27 Feb	Thai-Denmark Nongrua	0–3	Idea Khonkaen	20–25	18–25	16–25			54–75
27 Feb	Supreme Chonburi E-Tech	0–3	Bangkok Glass	25–27	23–25	23–25			71–77
28 Feb	3BB Nakhonnont	3–0	King-Bangkok	25–10	25–15	25–16			75–41
28 Feb	Cosmo-Chiang Rai	0–3	Nakhon Ratchasima	13–25	18–25	15–25			46–75
5 Mar	Supreme Chonburi E-Tech	3–0	Thai-Denmark Nongrua	25–18	25–19	25–19			75–56
12 Mar	Bangkok Glass	3–0	Idea Khonkaen	25–18	25–18	25–16			75–52
13 Mar	Nakhon Ratchasima	3–1	King-Bangkok	25–23	21–25	26–24	25–14		97–86
13 Mar	Cosmo-Chiang Rai	1–3	3BB Nakhonnont	25–22	21–25	7–25	11–25		64–97

== Final standing ==
Rank	Team
1st place, gold medalist(s)	Bangkok Glass
2nd place, silver medalist(s)	Supreme Chonburi E-Tech
3rd place, bronze medalist(s)	Nakhon Ratchasima
4	Idea Khonkaen
5	3BB Nakhonnont
6	King-Bangkok
7	Thai-Denmark Nongrua
8	Cosmo-Chiang Rai

Qualified for the 2016 Asian Club Championship and 2016 Thai-Denmark Super League
Qualified for the 2016 Thai-Denmark Super League
Relegated to Group 2

== Awards ==
Award	Winner	Team
MVP	(Thailand) Pleumjit Thinkaow	Bangkok Glass
Best scorer	(Thailand) Wanitchaya Luangtonglang	Nakhon Ratchasima
Best spiker	(United States) Chloe Mann	3BB Nakhonnont
Best blocker	(Thailand) Pleumjit Thinkaow	Bangkok Glass
Best server	(United States) Ashley Frazier	Supreme Chonburi
Best setter	(Thailand) Soraya Phomla	Idea Khonkaen
Best libero	(Thailand) Yupa Sanitklang	Nakhon Ratchasima
