= 2017–18 Women's Volleyball Thailand League =

2017–18 Women's Thailand League
- League: Thailand League
- Duration: September 4, 2017 – March, 2018
- Games: 56 (Regular Season)
- Teams: 8

2017–2018
- Season champions: Supreme Chonburi-E.Tech (2nd title)
- Season MVP: (Thailand) Ajcharaporn Kongyot (Chonburi) (United States) Sareea Freeman (Chonburi)

Women's Thailand League seasons
- ← 2016–17 2018–19 →

The 2017–18 season was the 13th season of the Women's Volleyball Thailand League, the top Thai professional league for association volleyball clubs, since its establishment in 2005. Eight teams competed in the league. The season started on 4 September 2017.

== Teams ==
Locations of the Thailand League 2017–18 teams

=== Members ===
Women's Thailand League members
Club	Province	2016–17 season
King-Bangkok	Bangkok	TL Sixth place
Bangkok Glass	Pathum Thani	TL Runners-up
Cosmo Chiang Rai	Chiang Rai	PC Runners-up
Khonkaen Star	Khon Kaen	TL Fifth place
Nakhon Ratchasima The Mall	Nakhon Ratchasima	TL Third place
3BB Nakornnont	Nonthaburi	TL Fourth place
Rangsit University	Pathum Thani	PC Winners
Supreme Chonburi-E.Tech	Chonburi	TL Winners

=== Arenas ===
Women's Thailand League stadiums
Club	Stadium	Capacity
King-Bangkok	RU Gymnasium	—
Bangkok Glass	BG Sport Hall	9,700
Cosmo Chiang Rai	PSRU Indoor Stadium (Phitsanulok's home)	8,200
Khonkaen Star	Khon Kaen Provincial Gymnasium	4,000
Nakhon Ratchasima The Mall	The Mall Nakhon Ratchasima	5,100
3BB Nakornnont	King Rama IX Stadium	8,200
Rangsit University	RSU Gymnasium	4,300
Supreme Chonburi-E.Tech	Chonburi Municipal Stadium	8,700
Supreme Chonburi-E.Tech	Assumption College Sriracha	—

=== Personnel and sponsoring ===
Women's Thailand League personnel and sponsoring
Team	Head coach	Team captain	Colors	Kit manufacturer	Main Sponsor
King-Bangkok	(Thailand) Rakpong Janjaroen	(Thailand) Waraporn Poomjarern		Kela	King rice bran oil
Bangkok Glass	(Thailand) Danai Tipsathien	(Thailand) Pleumjit Thinkaow		Grand Sport	Singha
Cosmo Chiang Rai	(Thailand) Chatchawan Meekrit	(Thailand) Patcharee Sangmuang		Grand Sport	Cosmo oil
Khonkaen Star	(Thailand) Sunton Poeseetha	(Thailand) Pornthip Santrong		Grand Sport	Cho-Thavee
Nakhon Ratchasima The Mall	(Thailand) Chamnan Dokmai	(Thailand) Onuma Sittirak		Mizuno	The Mall
3BB Nakornnont	(Thailand) Thanakit Inleang	(Thailand) Narumon Khanan		Grand Sport	3BB internet
Rangsit University	(Thailand) Sanong Kullachim	(Thailand) Sunantha Songsai		Grand Sport	Rangsit University
Supreme Chonburi-E.Tech	(Thailand) Nataphon Srisamutnak	(Thailand) Wilavan Apinyapong		Mizuno	Supreme

=== National team players ===
Women's Thailand League national team players
Team	Player 1	Player 2
Bangkok Glass	Pleumjit Thinkaow	Pornpun Guedpard
Khonkaen Star	Tapaphaipun Chaisri	—
Nakhon Ratchasima The Mall	Hattaya Bamrungsuk	Chatchu-on Moksri
Supreme Chonburi-E.Tech	Wilavan Apinyapong	Ajcharaporn Kongyot

National team player quota regulation

- National tram players who were active in 2017 international tournaments.
- FIVB tournament: 2017 FIVB Volleyball World Grand Prix
- AVC tournament: 2017 Asian Women's Volleyball Championship
- Regional tournament: 2017 Southeast Asian Games
- 2018 FIVB Volleyball Women's World Championship qualification was not including in 2017 but will use in 2018.
- Academic players will not including in national team player quota.

=== Foreign players ===
Women's Thailand League foreign players
Team	Player 1	Player 2
Bangkok Glass	(Greece) Anna Maria Spanou (CEV)	—
Khonkaen	(Brazil) Elisângela Paulino (CSV)	—
Rangsit University	(Hong Kong) Yeung Sau-Mei (AVC)	—
Supreme Chonburi-E.Tech	(Venezuela) Aleoscar Blanco (CSV)	(United States) Sareea Freeman (NORCECA)

== Tournament format ==
- First round: single round-robin.
- Second round: single round-robin.

=== Season standing procedure ===
1. Number of matches won
2. Match points
3. Sets ratio
4. Points ratio
5. Result of the last match between the tied teams

Match won 3–0 or 3–1: 3 match points for the winner, 0 match points for the loser
Match won 3–2: 2 match points for the winner, 1 match point for the loser

== League table ==
=== Standings ===
Pos	Team	Pld	W	L	Pts	SW	SL	SR	SPW	SPL	SPR	Qualification
1	Supreme Chonburi-E.Tech	14	13	1	37	40	9	4.444	1160	910	1.275	Asian Championship and Super League
2	Nakhon Ratchasima The Mall	14	12	2	34	36	13	2.769	1149	960	1.197	Super League
3	Bangkok Glass	14	10	4	31	35	14	2.500	1156	933	1.239	Super League
4	Khonkaen Star	14	8	6	24	29	23	1.261	1162	1063	1.093	Super League
5	3BB Nakornnont	14	7	7	23	29	24	1.208	1188	1097	1.083	Super League
6	King-Bangkok	14	4	10	13	16	27	0.593	958	1045	0.917	Super League
7	Rangsit University	14	2	12	6	6	37	0.162	716	1030	0.695	Relegation to Pro League
8	Cosmo Chiang Rai	14	0	14	0	1	41	0.024	620	1071	0.579	Relegation to Pro League

=== Results ===
Home \ Away	BKK	BKG	CRI	KKN	NMA	NKN	RSU	SUP
King-Bangkok		0–2	2–0	0–2	0–2	0–2	2–0	0–2
Bangkok Glass	2–0		2–0	2–0	0–2	2–0	2–0	0–2
Cosmo Chiang Rai	0–2	0–2		0–2	0–2	0–2	0–2	0–2
Khonkaen Star	2–0	0–2	2–0		0–2	2–0	2–0	0–2
Nakhon Ratchasima The Mall	2–0	2–0	2–0	2–0		2–0	2–0	0–2
3BB Nakornnont	2–0	0–2	2–0	0–2	0–2		2–0	1–1
Rangsit University	0–2	0–2	2–0	0–2	0–2	0–2		0–2
Supreme Chonburi-E.Tech	2–0	2–0	2–0	2–0	2–0	1–1	2–0	

Updated to match(es) played on 22 October 2017. Source:
Legend: Blue = home team win; Yellow = draw; Red = away team win.

=== Positions by round ===
Leader
Relegation to Pro Challenge

Team ╲ Round	1	2	3	4	5	6	7	8	9	10	11	12	13	14
King-Bangkok	6	7	5	5	6	6	6	6	6	6	6	6	6	6
Bangkok Glass	3	4	3	3	2	2	3	3	3	3	3	3	3	3
Cosmo Chiang Rai	8	8	8	8	8	8	8	8	8	8	8	8	8	8
Khonkaen Star	5	6	7	7	5	5	4	4	4	5	4	4	4	4
Nakhon Ratchasima The Mall	4	3	4	4	3	3	2	2	2	2	2	2	2	2
3BB Nakornnont	2	2	2	2	4	4	5	5	5	4	5	5	5	5
Rangsit University	7	5	6	6	7	7	7	7	7	7	7	7	7	7
Supreme Chonburi-E.Tech	1	1	1	1	1	1	1	1	1	1	1	1	1	1

== First leg ==
Date	Time		Score		Set 1	Set 2	Set 3	Set 4	Set 5	Total	Report
4 Nov	15:00	Khonkaen Star	1–3	Nakhon Ratchasima The Mall	25–19	21–25	24–26	23–25		93–95	
11 Nov	15:00	Bangkok Glass	3–0	King-Bangkok	25–15	25–17	25–14			75–46	
11 Nov	15:00	Rangsit University	0–3	3BB Nakornnont	8–25	16–25	14–25			38–75	
12 Nov	15:00	Supreme Chonburi-E.Tech	3–0	Cosmo Chiang Rai	25–11	25–11	25–10			75–32	

Date	Time		Score		Set 1	Set 2	Set 3	Set 4	Set 5	Total	Report
18 Nov	15:00	Nakhon Ratchasima The Mall	3–1	Bangkok Glass	24–26	25–22	25–21	25–19		99–88	
18 Nov	15:00	3BB Nakornnont	3–1	King-Bangkok	21–25	25–18	25–20	30–28		101–91	
19 Nov	15:00	Cosmo Chiang Rai	1–3	Rangsit University	21–25	14–25	25–21	19–25		79–96	
19 Nov	18:00	Supreme Chonburi-E.Tech	3–0	Khonkaen Star	25–21	26–24	25–17			76–62	

Date	Time		Score		Set 1	Set 2	Set 3	Set 4	Set 5	Total	Report
25 Nov	15:00	Rangsit University	0–3	King-Bangkok	17–25	18–25	13–25			48–75	
25 Nov	15:00	Nakhon Ratchasima The Mall	0–3	Supreme Chonburi-E.Tech	19–25	21–25	17–25			57–75	
26 Nov	15:00	3BB Nakornnont	3–0	Cosmo Chiang Rai	25–18	25–19	25–15			75–52	
26 Nov	18:00	Khonkaen Star	0–3	Bangkok Glass	18–25	21–25	20–25			59–75	

Date	Time		Score		Set 1	Set 2	Set 3	Set 4	Set 5	Total	Report
2 Dec	15:00	Cosmo Chiang Rai	0–3	Bangkok Glass	14–25	16–25	17–25			47–75	
2 Dec	15:00	Nakhon Ratchasima The Mall	3–0	Rangsit University	25–10	25–16	25–13			75–39	
3 Dec	15:00	King-Bangkok	0–3	Supreme Chonburi-E.Tech	17–25	23–25	15-25			55–50	
3 Dec	18:30	3BB Nakornnont	2–3	Khonkaen Star	23–25	25–14	26–28	25–21	15–12	114–100	

Date	Time		Score		Set 1	Set 2	Set 3	Set 4	Set 5	Total	Report
9 Dec	15:00	Cosmo Chiang Rai	0–3	Khonkaen Star	16–25	14–25	14–25			44–75	
10 Dec	15:00	Rangsit University	0–3	Supreme Chonburi-E.Tech	15–25	11–25	23–25			49–75	
10 Dec	15:00	Nakhon Ratchasima The Mall	3–0	King-Bangkok	25–18	25–22	25–15			75–55	
11 Dec	16:00	3BB Nakornnont	1–3	Bangkok Glass	25–21	19–25	21–25	12–25		77–96	

Date	Time		Score		Set 1	Set 2	Set 3	Set 4	Set 5	Total	Report
16 Dec	15:00	Khonkaen Star	3–2	King-Bangkok	31–29	19–25	25–22	22–25	15–13	112–114	
16 Dec	18:00	Rangsit University	0–3	Bangkok Glass	20–25	14–25	15–25			49–75	
17 Dec	15:00	Nakhon Ratchasima The Mall	3–0	Cosmo Chiang Rai	25–7	25–17	25–16			75–40	
17 Dec	18:00	3BB Nakornnont	1–3	Supreme Chonburi-E.Tech	17–25	25–23	19–25	21–25		82–98	

Date	Time		Score		Set 1	Set 2	Set 3	Set 4	Set 5	Total	Report
23 Dec	15:00	3BB Nakornnont	2–3	Nakhon Ratchasima The Mall	21–25	25–22	24–26	25–21	11–15	106–109	
23 Dec	18:00	Bangkok Glass	1–3	Supreme Chonburi-E.Tech	25–15	18–25	18–25	23–25		84–90	
24 Dec	15:00	Rangsit University	0–3	Khonkaen Star	9–25	24–26	15–25			48–76	
24 Dec	18:00	King-Bangkok	3–0	Cosmo Chiang Rai	25–17	25–16	25–19			75–52	

== Second leg ==
Date	Time		Score		Set 1	Set 2	Set 3	Set 4	Set 5	Total	Report
13 Jan	18:00	King-Bangkok	0–3	Bangkok Glass	18–25	19–25	16–25			53–75	
13 Jan	18:00	Nakhon Ratchasima The Mall	3–0	3BB Nakornnont	25–18	25–18	28–26			78–62	
14 Jan	18:00	Cosmo Chiang Rai	0–3	Supreme Chonburi-E.Tech	9–25	14–25	15–25			38–75	
14 Jan	18:00	Rangsit University	0–3	Khonkaen Star	21–25	13–25	14–25			48–75	

Date	Time		Score		Set 1	Set 2	Set 3	Set 4	Set 5	Total	Report
20 Jan	18:00	Bangkok Glass	1–3	Nakhon Ratchasima The Mall	25–22	26–28	16–25	22–25		89–100	
20 Jan	18:00	King-Bangkok	1–3	3BB Nakornnont	19–25	25–21	10–25	23–25		77–96	
21 Jan	18:00	Khonkaen Star	2–3	Supreme Chonburi-E.Tech	25–12	20–25	25–19	18–25	13–15	101–96	
21 Jan	18:00	Rangsit University	3–0	Cosmo Chiang Rai	25–14	25–18	25–19			75–51	

Date	Time		Score		Set 1	Set 2	Set 3	Set 4	Set 5	Total	Report
3 Feb	15:00	Rangsit University	0–3	King-Bangkok	13–25	13–25	23–25			49–75	
3 Feb	15:00	Supreme Chonburi-E.Tech	3–0	Nakhon Ratchasima The Mall	25–14	25–23	25–18			75–55	
4 Feb	18:00	Cosmo Chiang Rai	0–3	3BB Nakornnont	6–25	20–25	9–25			35–75	
4 Feb	18:00	Bangkok Glass	3–0	Khonkaen Star	25–14	25–15	25–15			75–44	

Date	Time		Score		Set 1	Set 2	Set 3	Set 4	Set 5	Total	Report
10 Feb	18:00	Supreme Chonburi-E.Tech	3–0	King-Bangkok	25–16	25–18	25–15			75–49	
10 Feb	18:00	Nakhon Ratchasima The Mall	3–0	Rangsit University	25–21	25–13	25–21			75–55	
11 Feb	18:00	Bangkok Glass	3–0	Cosmo Chiang Rai	25–12	25–13	25–13			75–38	
11 Feb	18:00	3BB Nakornnont	1–3	Khonkaen Star	22–25	25–27	25–15	20–25		92–92	

Date	Time		Score		Set 1	Set 2	Set 3	Set 4	Set 5	Total	Report
17 Feb	15:00	3BB Nakornnont	1–3	Bangkok Glass	25–22	18–25	19–25	18–25		80–97	
17 Feb	15:00	King-Bangkok	0–3	Nakhon Ratchasima The Mall	18–25	17–25	23–25			58–75	
18 Feb	18:00	Supreme Chonburi-E.Tech	3–0	Rangsit University	25–19	25–21	25–17			75–57	
18 Feb	18:00	Khonkaen Star	3–0	Cosmo Chiang Rai	25–9	25–20	25–4			75–33	

Date	Time		Score		Set 1	Set 2	Set 3	Set 4	Set 5	Total	Report
24 Feb	15:00	Rangsit University	0–3	Bangkok Glass	14–25	13–25	16–25			43–75	
24 Feb	15:00	Nakhon Ratchasima The Mall	3–2	Khonkaen Star	25–21	15–25	24–26	25–19	17–15	106–106	
25 Feb	15:00	3BB Nakornnont	3–1	Supreme Chonburi-E.Tech	28–26	26–24	14–25	25–17		93–92	
25 Feb	15:00	Cosmo Chiang Rai	0–3	King-Bangkok	16–25	22–25	20–25			58–75	

Date	Time		Score		Set 1	Set 2	Set 3	Set 4	Set 5	Total	Report
3 Mar	15:00	Supreme Chonburi-E.Tech	3–2	Bangkok Glass	21–25	22–25	25–22	25–22	15–12	108–106	
3 Mar	15:00	3BB Nakornnont	3–0	Rangsit University	25–9	25–11	25–12			75–32	
4 Mar	18:00	Cosmo Chiang Rai	0–3	Nakhon Ratchasima The Mall	12–25	8–25	11–25			31–75	
4 Mar	18:00	Khonkaen Star	3–0	King-Bangkok	25–16	25–19	29–27			79–62	

== Final standing ==
Rank	Team
1st place, gold medalist(s)	Supreme Chonburi-E.Tech
2nd place, silver medalist(s)	Nakhon Ratchasima The Mall
3rd place, bronze medalist(s)	Bangkok Glass
4	Khonkaen Star
5	3BB Nakornnont
6	King-Bangkok
7	Rangsit University
8	Cosmo Chiang Rai

Qualified for the Asian Championship and Super League
Qualified for the Super League
Relegated to Division 2

2017–18 Women's Thailand League
Supreme Chonburi-E.Tech
2nd title

Champion and Thailand League representative
Team roster
Supattra Pairoj, Wipawee Srithong, Sasiwimon Sangpan, Sumalai Prasodsuk, Patcharaporn Sittisad, Tirawan Sang-ob, Wilavan Apinyapong (c), Nampueng Kamart, Soraya Phomla, Wiriya Songmuang, Aleoscar Blanco, Malika Kanthong, Parinya Pankaew, Watchareeya Nualjam, Ajcharaporn Kongyot, Napatsorn Ammarinrat, Kunjira Kongmingoein, Sareea Freeman
Head coach
Nataphon Srisamutnak

== Awards ==
- Most valuable player
  (Thailand) Ajcharaporn Kongyot (Supreme Chonburi-E.Tech)
- Most Valuable Foreign Player
  (United States) Sareea Freeman (Supreme Chonburi-E.Tech)
- Best Spiker
  (Brazil) Elisângela Oliveira (Khonkaen Star)
- Best outside spiker
  (Thailand) Chatchu-on Moksri (Nakhon Ratchasima)
  (Thailand) Onuma Sittirak (Nakhon Ratchasima)
- Best middle blocker
  (Thailand) Watchareeya Nualjam (Supreme Chonburi-E.Tech)
  (Thailand) Hattaya Bamrungsuk (Nakhon Ratchasima)
- Best setter
  (Thailand) Soraya Phomla (Supreme Chonburi-E.Tech)
- Best opposite spiker
  (Thailand) Malika Kanthong (Supreme Chonburi-E.Tech)
- Best libero
  (Thailand) Tapaphaipun Chaisri (Khonkaen Star)

== See also ==
- 2017–18 Men's Volleyball Thailand League
