= 2016 Women's Volleyball Thai-Denmark Super League =

Tournament details
- Host country: MCC Hall of The Mall Bangkapi Bangkok, Thailand
- Dates: 23 – 28 March 2016
- Teams: 8
- Venue: 1 (in 1 host city)

Final positions
- Champions: Bangkok Glass (2nd title)

Tournament awards
- MVP: (Thailand) Pornpun Guedpard

The 2016 Women's Volleyball Thai-Denmark Super League 2016 (Thai: วอลเลย์บอลหญิงไทยเดนมาร์คซูเปอร์ลีก 2016) was the fourth edition of the tournament. It was held at the MCC Hall of The Mall Bangkapi in Bangkok, Thailand from 23 – 28 March 2016.

== Teams ==
- (Thailand) Bangkok Glass
- (Thailand) Idea Khonkaen
- (Thailand) Nakhon Ratchasima
- (Thailand) Supreme Chonburi E-Tech
- (Thailand) 3BB Nakhonnont
- (Thailand) King-Bangkok
- (Philippines) Petron-PSL All Stars
- Hong Kong

== Pools composition ==
Pool A	Pool B
(Thailand) Bangkok Glass; (Thailand) Idea Khonkaen; (Thailand) 3BB Nakhonnont; (Philippines) Petron-PSL All-Stars	(Thailand) Supreme Chonburi; (Thailand) Nakhon Ratchasima; (Thailand) King-Bangkok; Hong Kong

== Preliminary round ==
=== Pool A ===
Pos	Team	Pld	W	L	Pts	SW	SL	SR	SPW	SPL	SPR	Qualification
1	(Thailand) Bangkok Glass	3	3	0	9	9	2	4.500	268	179	1.497	Semifinals
2	(Thailand) Idea Khonkaen	3	2	1	6	6	4	1.500	214	210	1.019	Semifinals
3	(Thailand) 3BB Nakhonnont	3	1	2	3	5	7	0.714	248	253	0.980	
4	(Philippines) Petron-PSL All-Stars	3	0	3	0	2	9	0.222	188	271	0.694	

Date	Time		Score		Set 1	Set 2	Set 3	Set 4	Set 5	Total	Report
23 Mar	16:00	Bangkok Glass (Thailand)	3–1	(Philippines) Petron-PSL	23–25	25–11	25–16	25–9		98–61	
24 Mar	14:00	Bangkok Glass (Thailand)	3–1	(Thailand) 3BB Nakhonnont	25–18	25–16	20–25	25–17		95–76	
24 Mar	16:00	Petron-PSL (Philippines)	0–3	(Thailand) Idea Khonkaen	22–25	20–25	19–25			61–75	
25 Mar	14:00	3BB Nakhonnont (Thailand)	1–3	(Thailand) Idea Khonkaen	18–25	15–25	25–17	16–25		74–92	
26 Mar	12:00	Bangkok Glass (Thailand)	3–0	(Thailand) Idea Khonkaen	25–21	25–10	25–16			75–47	
26 Mar	14:00	Petron-PSL (Philippines)	1–3	(Thailand) 3BB Nakhonnont	15–25	11–25	25–23	15–25		66–98	

=== Pool B ===
Pos	Team	Pld	W	L	Pts	SW	SL	SR	SPW	SPL	SPR	Qualification
1	(Thailand) Supreme Chonburi	3	3	0	9	9	1	9.000	250	163	1.534	Semifinals
2	(Thailand) Nakhon Ratchasima	3	2	1	6	7	3	2.333	226	201	1.124	Semifinals
3	(Thailand) King-Bangkok	3	1	2	3	3	6	0.500	183	206	0.888	
4	Hong Kong	3	0	3	0	0	9	0.000	137	226	0.606	

Date	Time		Score		Set 1	Set 2	Set 3	Set 4	Set 5	Total	Report
23 Mar	18:00	Supreme Chonburi (Thailand)	3–0	Hong Kong	25–10	25–18	25–12			75–40	
24 Mar	18:00	Nakhon Ratchasima (Thailand)	3–0	(Thailand) King-Bangkok	25–18	25–21	25–21			75–60	
25 Mar	16:00	Supreme Chonburi (Thailand)	3–1	(Thailand) Nakhon Ratchasima	25–27	25–9	25–21	25–19		100–76	
25 Mar	18:00	Hong Kong	0–3	(Thailand) King-Bangkok	24–26	18–25	14–25			56–76	
26 Mar	16:00	Supreme Chonburi (Thailand)	3–0	(Thailand) King-Bangkok	25–16	25–23	25–8			75–47	
26 Mar	18:00	Hong Kong	0–3	(Thailand) Nakhon Ratchasima	13–25	11–25	17–25			41–75	

== Final round ==
Semifinals
27 March
(Thailand) Bangkok Glass	3
(Thailand) Nakhon Ratchasima	0
27 March
(Thailand) Idea Khonkaen	1
(Thailand) Supreme Chonburi	3

Final
28 March
(Thailand) Bangkok Glass	3
(Thailand) Supreme Chonburi	2

=== Semifinals ===
Date	Time		Score		Set 1	Set 2	Set 3	Set 4	Set 5	Total	Report
27 Mar	16:00	Bangkok Glass (Thailand)	3–0	(Thailand) Nakhon Ratchasima	25–21	25-23	25–13			75–34	
27 Mar	18:00	Idea Khonkaen (Thailand)	1–3	(Thailand) Supreme Chonburi	18–25	20–25	25–22	21–25		84–97	

=== Final ===
Date	Time		Score		Set 1	Set 2	Set 3	Set 4	Set 5	Total	Report
28 Mar	15:00	Bangkok Glass (Thailand)	3–2	(Thailand) Supreme Chonburi	11–25	25–18	25–20	22–25	16–14	99–102	

== Final standing ==
Rank	Team
1st place, gold medalist(s)	(Thailand) Bangkok Glass
2nd place, silver medalist(s)	(Thailand) Supreme Chonburi
3rd place, bronze medalist(s)	(Thailand) Nakhon Ratchasima
3rd place, bronze medalist(s)	(Thailand) Idea Khonkaen
5	(Thailand) 3BB Nakhonnont
5	(Thailand) King-Bangkok
7	(Philippines) Petron-PSL All Stars
7	Hong Kong

== See also ==
- 2016 Men's Volleyball Thai-Denmark Super League
