= 2015 Women's Volleyball Thai-Denmark Super League =

Tournament details
- Host country: MCC Hall of The Mall Ngamwongwan Nonthaburi, Thailand
- Dates: 26 – 30 March 2015
- Teams: 6
- Venue: 1 (in 1 host city)

Final positions
- Champions: Bangkok Glass (1st title)

Tournament awards
- MVP: (Thailand) Pleumjit Thinkaow

2015 Women's Volleyball Thai-Denmark Super League (Thai: วอลเลย์บอลหญิงไทยเดนมาร์คซูเปอร์ลีก 2015) was the third edition of the tournament. It was held at the MCC Hall of The Mall Ngamwongwan in Nonthaburi, Thailand from 26 – 30 March 2015.

== Teams ==
1. Bangkok Glass
2. Ayutthaya A.T.C.C.
3. Idea Khonkaen
4. Nakhonnont 3BB
5. Nakhon Ratchasima
6. Supreme Chonburi E-Tech

== Pools composition ==
Pool A	Pool B
Bangkok Glass; Nakhon Ratchasima; Nakhonnont 3BB	Ayutthaya A.T.C.C.; Supreme Chonburi E-Tech; Idea Khonkaen

== Preliminary round ==
=== Pool A ===
Pos	Team	Pld	W	L	Pts	SW	SL	SR	SPW	SPL	SPR	Qualification
1	Bangkok Glass	2	2	0	5	6	3	2.000	201	169	1.189	Semifinals
2	Nakhonnont 3BB	2	1	1	4	5	4	1.250	183	197	0.929	Semifinals
3	Nakhon Ratchasima	2	0	2	0	2	6	0.333	169	187	0.904	

Date	Time		Score		Set 1	Set 2	Set 3	Set 4	Set 5	Total	Report
26 Mar	15:00	Bangkok Glass	3–1	Nakhon Ratchasima	25–19	25–13	22–25	25–19		97–76	
27 Mar	15:00	Nakhon Ratchasima	1–3	Nakhonnont 3BB	23–25	23–25	25–15	22–25		93–90	
28 Mar	15:00	Bangkok Glass	3–2	Nakhonnont 3BB	20-25	19–25	25–22	25–14	15–7	104–68	

=== Pool B ===
Pos	Team	Pld	W	L	Pts	SW	SL	SR	SPW	SPL	SPR	Qualification
1	Idea Khonkaen	2	2	0	6	6	1	6.000	178	150	1.187	Semifinals
2	Ayutthaya A.T.C.C.	2	1	1	3	3	4	0.750	150	156	0.962	Semifinals
3	Supreme Chonburi E-Tech	2	0	2	0	2	6	0.333	177	200	0.885	

Date	Time		Score		Set 1	Set 2	Set 3	Set 4	Set 5	Total	Report
26 Mar	17:00	Ayutthaya A.T.C.C.	0–3	Idea Khonkaen	17–25	22–25	24–26			63–76	
27 Mar	17:00	Idea Khonkaen	3–1	Supreme Chonburi E-Tech	28–26	25–22	24–26	25–23		102–97	
28 Mar	17:00	Ayutthaya A.T.C.C.	3–1	Supreme Chonburi E-Tech	22–25	25–22	25–18	25–15		97–80	

== Final round ==
Semifinals
29 Mar
Bangkok Glass	3
Ayutthaya A.T.C.C.	2
29 Mar
Idea Khonkaen	2
Nakhonnont 3BB	3

Final
30 Mar
Bangkok Glass	3
Nakhonnont 3BB	0

=== Semifinals ===
Date	Time		Score		Set 1	Set 2	Set 3	Set 4	Set 5	Total	Report
29 Mar	15:00	Bangkok Glass	3–2	Ayutthaya A.T.C.C.	25–20	21–25	22–25	26–24	16–14	110–108	
29 Mar	17:00	Idea Khonkaen	2–3	Nakhonnont 3BB	20–25	25–18	25–21	21–25	10–15	101–104	

=== Final ===
Date	Time		Score		Set 1	Set 2	Set 3	Set 4	Set 5	Total	Report
30 Mar	14:00	Bangkok Glass	3–0	Nakhonnont 3BB	25-21	25-7	25-23			75–0	

== Final standing ==
Rank	Team
1st place, gold medalist(s)	Bangkok Glass
2nd place, silver medalist(s)	Nakhonnont 3BB
3rd place, bronze medalist(s)	Ayutthaya A.T.C.C.
3rd place, bronze medalist(s)	Idea Khonkaen
5	Nakhon Ratchasima
5	Supreme Chonburi

== See also ==
- 2015 Men's Volleyball Thai-Denmark Super League
