= 2018 Women's Volleyball Thai-Denmark Super League =

2018 Women's Volleyball Thai–Denmark Super League
Tournament details
- Host country: MCC Hall of The Mall Bangkapi Bangkok, Thailand
- Dates: 28 March – 1 April 2018
- Teams: 6
- Venue: 1 (in 1 host city)

Tournament awards
- MVP: (Thailand) Ajcharaporn Kongyot

2018 Women's Volleyball Thai–Denmark Super League (Thai: วอลเลย์บอลหญิงไทยเดนมาร์คซูเปอร์ลีก 2018) was the 6th edition of the tournament. It was held at the MCC Hall of The Mall Bangkapi in Bangkok, Thailand from 28 March – 1 April 2018.

== Teams ==
=== Foreign players ===
Women's Thai-Denmark Super League foreign players
| Team | Player 1 | Player 2 |
|---|---|---|
| Bangkok Glass | (Greece) Anna Maria Spanou (CEV) | —N/a |
| Khonkaen | (Brazil) Elisângela Paulino (CSV) | —N/a |
| King-Bangkok | (Hong Kong) Yeung Sau-Mei (AVC) | —N/a |
| Supreme Chonburi-E.Tech | (Venezuela) Aleoscar Blanco (CSV) | (United States) Sareea Freeman (NORCECA) |
| Nakhon Ratchasima The Mall | —N/a | —N/a |
| 3BB Nakornnont | —N/a | —N/a |

== Pools composition ==
| Pool A | Pool B |
|---|---|
| Supreme Chonburi-E.Tech; Bangkok Glass; Khonkaen Star | Nakhon Ratchasima The Mall; 3BB Nakornnont; King-Bangkok |

== Preliminary round ==
=== Pool A ===
| Pos | Team | Pld | W | L | Pts | SW | SL | SR | SPW | SPL | SPR | Qualification |
|---|---|---|---|---|---|---|---|---|---|---|---|---|
| 1 | Bangkok Glass | 2 | 1 | 1 | 3 | 4 | 3 | 1.333 | 164 | 158 | 1.038 | Semifinals |
| 2 | Supreme Chonburi-E.Tech | 2 | 1 | 1 | 3 | 3 | 3 | 1.000 | 132 | 125 | 1.056 | Semifinals |
| 3 | Khonkaen Star | 2 | 1 | 1 | 3 | 3 | 4 | 0.750 | 152 | 164 | 0.927 | |

| Date | Time | | Score | | Set 1 | Set 2 | Set 3 | Set 4 | Set 5 | Total | Report |
|---|---|---|---|---|---|---|---|---|---|---|---|
| 28 Mar | 16:15 | Supreme Chonburi-E.Tech | 3–0 | Khonkaen Star | 25–13 | 25–18 | 25–19 | | | 75–50 | |
| 29 Mar | 16:15 | Supreme Chonburi-E.Tech | 0–3 | Bangkok Glass | 23–25 | 19–25 | 15–25 | | | 57–75 | |
| 30 Mar | 16:15 | Khonkaen Star | 3–1 | Bangkok Glass | 19–25 | 25–21 | 25–12 | 33–31 | | 102–89 | |

=== Pool B ===
| Pos | Team | Pld | W | L | Pts | SW | SL | SR | SPW | SPL | SPR | Qualification |
|---|---|---|---|---|---|---|---|---|---|---|---|---|
| 1 | Nakhon Ratchasima The Mall | 2 | 2 | 0 | 6 | 6 | 0 | MAX | 150 | 112 | 1.339 | Semifinals |
| 2 | 3BB Nakornnont | 2 | 1 | 1 | 3 | 3 | 3 | 1.000 | 135 | 139 | 0.971 | Semifinals |
| 3 | King-Bangkok | 2 | 0 | 2 | 0 | 0 | 6 | 0.000 | 120 | 154 | 0.779 | |

| Date | Time | | Score | | Set 1 | Set 2 | Set 3 | Set 4 | Set 5 | Total | Report |
|---|---|---|---|---|---|---|---|---|---|---|---|
| 28 Mar | 18:45 | Nakhon Ratchasima The Mall | 3–0 | 3BB Nakornnont | 25–21 | 25–12 | 25–23 | | | 75–56 | |
| 29 Mar | 18:45 | Nakhon Ratchasima The Mall | 3–0 | King-Bangkok | 25–23 | 25–16 | 25–17 | | | 75–56 | |
| 30 Mar | 18:45 | 3BB Nakornnont | 3–0 | King-Bangkok | 25–18 | 25–19 | 29–27 | | | 79–64 | |

== Final round ==
Semifinals
31 March
Bangkok Glass | 3
3BB Nakornnont | 0
31 March
Supreme Chonburi | 3
Nakhon Ratchasima | 2

Final
1 April
Supreme Chonburi | 3
Bangkok Glass | 2

=== Semifinals ===
| Date | Time | | Score | | Set 1 | Set 2 | Set 3 | Set 4 | Set 5 | Total | Report |
|---|---|---|---|---|---|---|---|---|---|---|---|
| 31 Mar | 16:15 | Bangkok Glass | 3–0 | 3BB Nakornnont | 25–21 | 25–17 | 25–15 | | | 75–53 | |
| 31 Mar | 18:45 | Supreme Chonburi | 3–2 | Nakhon Ratchasima The Mall | 15–25 | 25–18 | 25–20 | 23–25 | 15–11 | 103–99 | |

=== Final ===
| Date | Time | | Score | | Set 1 | Set 2 | Set 3 | Set 4 | Set 5 | Total | Report |
|---|---|---|---|---|---|---|---|---|---|---|---|
| 1 Apr | 15:30 | Supreme Chonburi | 3–2 | Bangkok Glass | 22–25 | 18–25 | 25–18 | 25–10 | 16–14 | 106–92 | |

== Final standing ==
| Rank | Team |
|---|---|
| 1st place, gold medalist(s) | Supreme Chonburi |
| 2nd place, silver medalist(s) | Bangkok Glass |
| 3rd place, bronze medalist(s) | Nakhon Ratchasima The Mall |
| 3rd place, bronze medalist(s) | 3BB Nakornnont |
| 5 | Khonkaen Star |
| 5 | King-Bangkok |

== See also ==
- 2018 Men's Volleyball Thai–Denmark Super League
