= 2017 Women's Volleyball Thai-Denmark Super League =

Tournament details
- Host country: MCC Hall of The Mall Bangkapi Bangkok, Thailand
- Dates: 22 – 26 March 2017
- Teams: 6
- Venue: 1 (in 1 host city)

Tournament awards
- MVP: (Senegal) Fatou Diouck

2017 Women's Volleyball Thai-Denmark Super League (Thai: วอลเลย์บอลหญิงไทยเดนมาร์คซูเปอร์ลีก 2017) was the 5th edition of the tournament. It was held at the MCC Hall of The Mall Bangkapi in Bangkok, Thailand from 22 – 26 March 2017.

== Teams ==
- Supreme Chonburi
- Bangkok Glass
- Nakhon Ratchasima
- 3BB Nakornnont
- Khonkaen Star
- King-Bangkok

== Pools composition ==
Pool A	Pool B
Supreme Chonburi; Nakhon Ratchasima; Khonkaen Star	Bangkok Glass; 3BB Nakornnont; King-Bangkok

== Preliminary round ==
=== Pool A ===
Pos	Team	Pld	W	L	Pts	SW	SL	SR	SPW	SPL	SPR	Qualification
1	Supreme Chonburi	2	2	0	6	6	0	MAX	150	108	1.389	Semifinals
2	Nakhon Ratchasima	2	1	1	3	3	3	1.000	126	142	0.887	Semifinals
3	Khonkaen Star	2	0	2	0	0	6	0.000	125	151	0.828	

Date	Time		Score		Set 1	Set 2	Set 3	Set 4	Set 5	Total	Report
22 Mar	16:30	Supreme Chonburi	3–0	Khonkaen Star	25–18	25–19	25–21			75–58	
23 Mar	16:30	Supreme Chonburi	3–0	Nakhon Ratchasima	25–19	25–17	25–14			75–50	
24 Mar	16:30	Khonkaen Star	0–3	Nakhon Ratchasima	23–25	24–26	20–25			67–76	

=== Pool B ===
Pos	Team	Pld	W	L	Pts	SW	SL	SR	SPW	SPL	SPR	Qualification
1	Bangkok Glass	2	2	0	6	6	2	3.000	193	157	1.229	Semifinals
2	3BB Nakornnont	2	1	1	3	4	4	1.000	154	178	0.865	Semifinals
3	King-Bangkok	2	0	2	0	2	6	0.333	157	169	0.929	

Date	Time		Score		Set 1	Set 2	Set 3	Set 4	Set 5	Total	Report
22 Mar	19:00	Bangkok Glass	3–1	King-Bangkok	25–17	23–25	25–22	25–10		98–74	
23 Mar	19:00	Bangkok Glass	3–1	3BB Nakornnont	25–16	20–25	25–20	25–22		95–83	
24 Mar	19:00	King-Bangkok	1–3	3BB Nakornnont	21–25	14–25	27–25	21-25		83–75	

== Final round ==
Semifinals
25 March
Bangkok Glass	3
Nakhon Ratchasima	2
25 March
Supreme Chonburi	3
3BB Nakornnont	0

Final
26 March
Bangkok Glass	1
Supreme Chonburi	3

=== Semifinals ===
Date	Time		Score		Set 1	Set 2	Set 3	Set 4	Set 5	Total	Report
25 Mar	14.00	Bangkok Glass	3–2	Nakhon Ratchasima	21–25	24–26	25–17	25-20	15-9	110–68	
25 Mar	19:00	Supreme Chonburi	3–0	3BB Nakornnont	25–21	25–12	25–15			75–48	

=== Final ===
Date	Time		Score		Set 1	Set 2	Set 3	Set 4	Set 5	Total	Report
26 Mar	18:30	Bangkok Glass	1–3	Supreme Chonburi	18–25	25–21	17–25	19–25		79–96	

== Final standing ==
Rank	Team
1st place, gold medalist(s)	Supreme Chonburi
2nd place, silver medalist(s)	Bangkok Glass
3rd place, bronze medalist(s)	Nakhon Ratchasima
3rd place, bronze medalist(s)	3BB Nakornnont
5	King-Bangkok
5	Khonkaen Star

== See also ==
- 2017 Men's Volleyball Thai-Denmark Super League
