= Women's Volleyball Thailand League =

Professional volleyball league in Thailand

Women's Thailand League
- Current season, competition or edition: 2024–25 Women's Volleyball Thailand League
- Sport: Volleyball
- Founded: 2005
- First season: 2005
- Administrator: Thai Volleyball Co., Ltd
- No. of teams: 8
- Country: Thailand
- Confederation: AVC
- Most recent champions: Nakhon Ratchasima QminC (7th titles)
- Most titles: Nakhon Ratchasima QminC (7th titles)
- Broadcasters: True4U; True Sport beIN Sports 5
- Level on pyramid: 1
- Relegation to: Pro Challenge
- Domestic cup: Super League
- International cups: AVC Championship; Asean Grand Prix
- Website: thaivolleyball.co.th

The Women's Volleyball Thailand League (Thai: วอลเลย์บอลหญิงไทยแลนด์ลีก) is the top-level professional women's volleyball league in Thailand. Contested by eight clubs, it operates on a system of promotion and relegation with the Volleyball Pro Challenge League. Seasons run from October to March, with teams playing 14 games each. Most games are played on Saturdays and Sundays, with a few games played on weekdays.

It is organized by the Thailand Volleyball Association (TVA). The league champion qualifies for the Asian Club Championship.

The league is recognized by the TVA, the FIVB, and the AVC. The league maintains strong ties with international volleyball governing bodies, adhering to the rules and regulations set by the FIVB and the AVC. The Women's Volleyball Thailand League is an FIVB-accredited club league, and its teams and players are registered with the FIVB. It is sponsored by Daikin and therefore officially known as the Daikin Women's Volleyball Thailand League. In the Thailand League, the games are played during Fridays, Saturdays and Sunday.

== Thailand League clubs ==
Locations of the Thailand League 2017–18 teams

There are 8 clubs in the league, with two promoted teams from Pro Challenge replacing the two teams that were relegated from Thailand League following the 2023–24 season.

=== Members (2023–2024) ===
Club	Location	2019–20 season
Kaennakorn–Thailand National Sports University	Pathum Thani	PC Winner
EUREKA – Sisaket	Sisaket	PC Runners-up
Supreme TIP Chonburi–E.Tech	Chonburi	TL Fourth place
Nakornnont	Nonthaburi	TL Fifth place
RSU	Pathum Thani	TL Sixth place
Khon Kaen University–Khonkaen Star	Khon Kaen	TL Third place
Nakhon Ratchasima Huione QminC	Nakhon Ratchasima	TL Winner
Diamond Food Fine Chef – Air Force	Bangkok	TL Runner-up

== Foreign Players ==
The Thai League mainly allows its clubs to hire a maximum of 2 foreign players for a season. Between the 2, 1 of them must be from an Asian Volleyball Confederation nation.

An extra +1 quota is given to the clubs if they decide to sign a player from a neighbouring Southeast Asian country.

=== 2023–24 season's Foreign Players ===
2023–24 Women's Foreign Players
Club	Player	From AVC	From Southeast Asia
Kaennakorn–Thailand National Sports University	none	none	none
EUREKA – Sisaket	none	none	none
Nakornnont	none	none	none
Diamond Food Fine Chef – Air Force	(Azerbaijan) Anastasiya Gurbanova (CEV)	(Japan) Misaki Yamauchi	none
Supreme TIP Chonburi–E.Tech	(Brazil) Maria Eduarda Leite de Farias (CSV)	(Vietnam) Doan Thi Lam Oanh	(Vietnam) Hoang Thi Kieu Trinh
RSU	none	none	none
Khon Kaen University–Khonkaen Star	none	none	none
Nakhon Ratchasima Huione QminC	(United States) Briana Holman (NORCECA)	(Japan) Kotoe Inoue	(Philippines) Celine Domingo

== Schedule 2023–24 ==
Stage	Week	Days	Venue
First leg	1	10–15 November 2023	Nimitbut Sport Center, Bangkok
First leg	2	17–21 November 2023	Nimitbut Sport Center, Bangkok
First leg	3	24–29 November 2023	Nimitbut Sport Center, Bangkok
First leg	4	1–3 December 2023	Nimitbut Sport Center, Bangkok
First leg	5	8–10 December 2023	Nakhon Pathom Sports Center Gymnasium, Nakhon Pathom
First leg	6	15–17 December 2023	Nakhon Pathom Sports Center Gymnasium, Nakhon Pathom
Second leg	7	23–24 December 2023	MCC Hall the Mall Korat,Nakhon Ratchasima
Second leg	8	6–7 January 2024	MCC Hall the Mall Korat,Nakhon Ratchasima
Second leg	9	13–14 January 2024	Nimitbut Sport Center, Bangkok
Second leg	10	20–21 January 2024	Nimitbut Sport Center, Bangkok
Second leg	11	27–28 January 2024	Nimitbut Sport Center, Bangkok
Final Series
Final Series	12	8–11 February 2024	Nimitbut Sport Center, Bangkok
Final Series	13	15–18 February 2024	Nimitbut Sport Center, Bangkok

== Results summary ==
Season	Champions	Runners-up	Third place
2026-27
2025–2026	Nakhon Ratchasima QminC	Harudot Chonburi RMUTT	Supreme TIP Chonburi E-Tech
2024–25	Supreme TIP Chonburi E-Tech	KKU Khonkaen Star	Nakhon Ratchasima QminC
2023–24	Nakhon Ratchasima Huione QminC	Diamond Food–Fine Chef	Supreme Chonburi
2022–23	Nakhon Ratchasima Huione QminC	Diamond Food–Fine Chef	Khonkaen Star
2021–22	Diamond Food–Fine Chef	Supreme Chonburi	Nakhon Ratchasima QminC
2020–21	Diamond Food	Nakhon Ratchasima The Mall	Supreme Chonburi
2019–20	Supreme Chonburi	Khonkaen Star	Nakhon Ratchasima The Mall
2018–19	Nakhon Ratchasima The Mall	Supreme Chonburi-E.Tech	3BB Nakornnont
2017–18	Supreme Chonburi-E.Tech	Nakhon Ratchasima The Mall	Bangkok Glass
2016–17	Supreme Chonburi-E.Tech	Bangkok Glass	Nakhon Ratchasima The Mall
2015–16	Bangkok Glass	Supreme Chonburi-E.Tech	Nakhon Ratchasima
2014–15	Bangkok Glass	Ayutthaya A.T.C.C	Idea Khonkaen
2013–14	Nakhon Ratchasima	Sisaket	Ayutthaya A.T.C.C
2012–13	Idea Khonkaen	Nakornnonthaburi	Nakhon Ratchasima
2011–12	Nakornnonthaburi	Supreme Nakhonsi	Kathu Phuket
2010–11	Kathu Phuket	Ayutthaya A.T.C.C	Nakhon Ratchasima
2009–10	Krungkao Mektec	Khonkaen	Nakhon Ratchasima
2008–09	Bangkok	Phra Nakhon Si Ayutthaya	Nonthaburi
2007–08	Khonkaen	Nonthaburi	Nakhon Ratchasima
2006–07	Nakhon Ratchasima	—N/a	—N/a
2005–06	Nakhon Ratchasima	Kathu Phuket	Khonkaen

== Champions ==
Club	Champions	Runners-up	Third place	Champion seasons
Nakhon Ratchasima	7	2	9	2005–06, 2006–07, 2013–14, 2018–19, 2022–23, 2023–24, 2025–2026
Supreme Chonburi	4	4	3	2016–17, 2017–18, 2019–20
Khonkaen	2	3	3	2007–08, 2012–13
Diamond Food	2	2	—N/a	2020–21, 2021–22
Bangkok Glass	2	1	1	2014–15, 2015–16
3BB Nakornnont	1	2	1	2011–12
Ayutthaya	1	2	1	2009–10
Kathu Phuket	1	1	1	2010–11
Bangkok	1	—N/a	—N/a	2008–09
RMUTT	—N/a	1	—N/a	—N/a

== Awards ==
=== Most valuable player ===
Season	Player	Club
2023–24	(Japan) Kotoe Inoue	Nakhon Ratchasima Huione QminC
2022–23	(Thailand) Onuma Sittirak	Nakhon Ratchasima Huione QminC
2020–21	(Thailand) Onuma Sittirak	Diamond Food
2019–20	(Thailand) Ajcharaporn Kongyot	Generali Supreme Chonburi-E.Tech
2018–19	(Thailand) Onuma Sittirak	Nakhon Ratchasima
2017–18	(Thailand) Ajcharaporn Kongyot	Supreme Chonburi-E.Tech
2016–17	(Thailand) Ajcharaporn Kongyot	Supreme Chonburi-E.Tech
2015–16	(Thailand) Pleumjit Thinkaow	Bangkok Glass
2014–15	(Thailand) Pleumjit Thinkaow	Bangkok Glass
2013–14	(Thailand) Hattaya Bamrungsuk	Nakhon Ratchasima
2012–13	(Thailand) Tapaphaipun Chaisri	Idea Khonkaen

=== Most Valuable Foreign Player ===
Season	Player	Club
2023–24	(Japan) Kotoe Inoue	Nakhon Ratchasima Huione QminC
2022–23	(United States) Ali Cudworth	Nakhon Ratchasima
2020–21	(Turkey) Yeliz Başa	Nakhon Ratchasima
2019–20	Not Awarded	
2017–18	(United States) Sareea Freeman	Supreme Chonburi-E.Tech
2016–17	(Senegal) Fatou Diouck	Supreme Chonburi-E.Tech
2015–16	Not Awarded	
2014–15	Not Awarded	
2013–14	Not Awarded	
2012–13	Not Awarded	

=== Best Opposite Spiker ===
Season	Player	Club
2023–24	(Japan) Misaki Yamauchi	Diamond Food
2022–23	(Thailand) Wipawee Srithong	Diamond Food
2020–21	(Turkey) Yeliz Başa	Nakhon Ratchasima
2019–20	(Thailand) Pimpichaya Kokram	3BB Nakornnont
2018–19	(Thailand) Malika Kanthong	Nakhon Ratchasima
2017–18	(Thailand) Malika Kanthong	Supreme Chonburi-E.Tech
2016–17	(Senegal) Fatou Diouck	Supreme Chonburi-E.Tech
2015–16	Not Awarded	
2014–15	(Thailand) Em-orn Phanusit	Idea Khonkaen
2013–14	(Thailand) Maliwan Prabnarong	Udonthani
2012–13	Not Awarded	

=== Best Outside Spikers ===
Season	Player	Club
2023–24	(Thailand) Sasipaporn Janthawisut	Nakhon Ratchasima Huione QminC
2023–24	(Thailand) Siriwan Deekaew	Supreme TIP Chonburi E–Tech
2022–23	(Thailand) Onuma Sittirak	Nakhon Ratchasima
2022–23	(Thailand) Sasipaporn Janthawisut	Diamond Food
2020–21	(Thailand) Chatchu-on Moksri	Nakhon Ratchasima
2020–21	(Thailand) Sasipaporn Janthawisut	Diamond Food
2019–20	(Thailand) Sutadta Chuewulim	Generali Supreme Chonburi-E.Tech
2019–20	(Thailand) Chatchu-on Moksri	Nakhon Ratchasima
2018–19	(Thailand) Kuttika Kaewpin	3BB Nakornnont
2018–19	(Thailand) Wilavan Apinyapong	Supreme Chonburi-E.Tech
2017–18	(Thailand) Chatchu-on Moksri	Nakhon Ratchasima
2017–18	(Thailand) Onuma Sittirak	Nakhon Ratchasima
2016–17	(Thailand) Ajcharaporn Kongyot	Supreme Chonburi-E.Tech
2016–17	(Thailand) Wilavan Apinyapong	Supreme Chonburi-E.Tech
2015–16	Not Awarded	
2014–15	(Thailand) Ajcharaporn Kongyot	Supreme Chonburi-E.Tech
2014–15	(Thailand) Wilavan Apinyapong	Nakhon Ratchasima
2013–14	(Thailand) Ajcharaporn Kongyot	Supreme Chonburi-E.Tech
2012–13	Not Awarded	

=== Best Scorer ===
Season	Player	Club
2023–24	(Thailand) Sasipaporn Janthawisut	Nakhon Ratchasima Huione QminC
2022–23	(Thailand) Sasipaporn Janthawisut	Diamond Food
2020–21	(Thailand) Chatchu-on Moksri	Nakhon Ratchasima
2019–20	(Thailand) Chatchu-on Moksri	Nakhon Ratchasima
2018–19	(Thailand) Kuttika Kaewpin	3BB Nakornnont
2017–18	(Brazil) Elisângela Oliveira	Khonkaen Star
2016–17	(Senegal) Fatou Diouck	Supreme Chonburi-E.Tech
2015–16	(United States) Chloe Mann	3BB Nakornnont
2012–13	(Thailand) Em-orn Phanusit	Idea Khonkaen

=== Best Middle Blockers ===
Season	Player	Club
2023–24	(Thailand) Pleumjit Thinkaow	Supreme TIP Chonburi E–Tech
2023–24	(Thailand) Kaewkalaya Kamulthala	Diamond Food
2022–23	(Thailand) Chitaporn Kamlangmak	Nakhon Ratchasima
2022–23	(Thailand) Tichakorn Boonlert	Diamond Food
2020–21	(Thailand) Chitaporn Kamlangmak	Nakhon Ratchasima
2020–21	(Thailand) Pleumjit Thinkaow	Generali Supreme Chonburi-E.Tech
2019–20	(Thailand) Thatdao Nuekjang	Khonkaen Star
2019–20	(Thailand) Pleumjit Thinkaow	Generali Supreme Chonburi-E.Tech
2018–19	(Thailand) Pleumjit Thinkaow	Supreme Chonburi-E.Tech
2018–19	(Vietnam) Trần Thị Bích Thủy	Quint Air Force
2017–18	(Thailand) Watchareeya Nuanjam	Supreme Chonburi-E.Tech
2017–18	(Thailand) Hattaya Bamrungsuk	Nakhon Ratchasima
2016–17	(Thailand) Thatdao Nuekjang	Khonkaen Star
2016–17	(Thailand) Pleumjit Thinkaow	Bangkok Glass
2015–16	(Thailand) Pleumjit Thinkaow	Bangkok Glass
2014–15	(Thailand) Rattanaporn Sanuanram	Bangkok
2014–15	(Thailand) Pleumjit Thinkaow	Bangkok Glass
2013–14	(Vietnam) Nguyễn Thị Ngọc Hoa	Ayutthaya A.T.C.C
2012–13	(Thailand) Hattaya Bamrungsuk	Nakhon Ratchasima

=== Best Setter ===
Season	Player	Club
2023–24	(Thailand) Sirima Manakit	Nakhon Ratchasima Huione QminC
2022–23	(Thailand) Sirima Manakit	Nakhon Ratchasima Huione QminC
2020–21	(Thailand) Sirima Manakit	Nakhon Ratchasima
2019–20	(Thailand) Pornpun Guedpard	Khonkaen Star
2018–19	(Thailand) Kullapa Piampongsan	Thai-Denmark Khonkaen Star
2017–18	(Thailand) Soraya Phomla	Supreme Chonburi-E.Tech
2016–17	(Thailand) Soraya Phomla	Supreme Chonburi-E.Tech
2015–16	(Thailand) Soraya Phomla	Idea Khonkaen
2014–15	(Thailand) Tichaya Boonlert	3BB Nakornnont
2013–14	(Thailand) Soraya Phomla	Ayutthaya A.T.C.C
2012–13	(Thailand) Soraya Phomla	Ayutthaya A.T.C.C

=== Best Libero ===
Season	Player	Club
2023–24	(Japan) Kotoe Inoue	Nakhon Ratchasima Huione QminC
2022–23	(Thailand) Tikamporn Changkeaw	Khonkaen Star
2020–21	(Thailand) Yupa Sanitklang	Nakhon Ratchasima
2019–20	(Thailand) Tikamporn Changkeaw	Khonkaen Star
2018–19	(Thailand) Tapaphaipun Chaisri	Thai-Denmark Khonkaen Star
2017–18	(Thailand) Tapaphaipun Chaisri	Khonkaen Star
2016–17	(Thailand) Supattra Pairoj	Supreme Chonburi-E.Tech
2015–16	(Thailand) Yupa Sanitklang	Nakhon Ratchasima
2014–15	(Thailand) Wanna Buakaew	Idea Khonkaen
2013–14	(Thailand) Tikamporn Changkeaw	Sisaket
2012–13	(Thailand) Tikamporn Changkeaw	Idea Khonkaen

=== Best Server ===
Season	Player	Club
2023–24	(Thailand) Sasipaporn Janthawisut	Nakhon Ratchasima Huione QminC
2022–23	(Thailand) Sasipaporn Janthawisut	Diamond Food
2020–21	(Thailand) Wiranyupa Inchan	Diamond Food
2020–21	(Thailand) Onuma Sittirak	Diamond Food
2019–20	(Thailand) Soraya Phomla	Generali Supreme Chonburi
2018–19	(Thailand) Kuttika Kaewpin	3BB Nakornnont
2017–18	(Thailand) Pleumjit Thinkaow	Bangkok Glass
2015–16	(Thailand) Ajcharaporn Kongyot	Supreme Chonburi-Etech
2015–16	(United States) Ashley Frazier	Supreme Chonburi-Etech
2012–13	(Thailand) Ajcharaporn Kongyot	Supreme Nakhonsi

== Former awards ==
=== Best Digger ===
Season	Player	Club
2022–23	(Thailand) Yupa Sanitklang	Nakhon Ratchasima
2022–23	(Thailand) Tikamporn Changkeaw	Khonkaen Star
2020–21	(Thailand) Supattra Pairoj	Supreme Chonburi E-Tech
2020–21	(Thailand) Tikamporn Changkeaw	Diamond Food
2019–20	(Thailand) Tikamporn Changkeaw	Khonkaen Star
2019–20	(Thailand) Supattra Pairoj	Supreme Chonburi E-Tech
2018–19	(Thailand) Tikamporn Changkeaw	Nakhon Ratchasima
2018–19	(Thailand) Tapaphaipun Chaisri	Khonkaen Star
2017–18	(Thailand) Supattra Pairoj	Supreme Chonburi E-Tech
2017–18	(Thailand) Tapaphaipun Chaisri	Khonkaen Star
2016–17	(Thailand) Supattra Pairoj	Supreme Chonburi E-Tech
2016–17	(Thailand) Tikamporn Changkeaw	Bangkok Glass
2015–16	(Thailand) Piyanut Pannoy	Supreme Chonburi E-Tech
2015–16	(Thailand) Tikamporn Changkeaw	Bangkok Glass
2013–14	Not Awarded	
2012–13	(Thailand) Yupa Sanitklang	Ayutthaya A.T.C.C
2012–13	(Thailand) Tikamporn Changkeaw	Idea Khonkaen

== Thailand League clubs in Asian Championship ==
Season	Club	Place	Awards
2025	TBA	TBA	
2024	Nakhon Ratchasima	TBA	
2023	Diamond Food	2nd	(Thailand) Nootsara Tomkom (Best Setter); (Thailand) Sasipaporn Janthawisut (Best Outside Spikers); (Thailand) Kaewkalaya Kamulthala (Best Middle Blockers)
2022	Diamond Food	3rd	(Thailand) Sasiwimol Sangpan (Best Middle Blocker)
2021	Supreme Chonburi	3rd	(Thailand) Pleumjit Thinkaow (Best Middle Blocker)
2021	Nakhon Ratchasima	2nd	(Thailand) Nootsara Tomkom (Best Setter)
2020	Supreme Chonburi	Canceled due to COVID-19 pandemic	
2019	Supreme Chonburi	2nd	(Thailand) Ajcharaporn Kongyot (Best Opposite Spiker)
2018	Supreme Chonburi	1st	(Thailand) Ajcharaporn Kongyot (Most Valuable Player); (Thailand) Ajcharaporn Kongyot (Best Outside Spiker)
2017	Supreme Chonburi	1st	(Senegal) Fatou Diouck (Most Valuable Player); (Thailand) Chatchu-on Moksri (Best Outside Spiker); (Thailand) Pleumjit Thinkaow (Best Middle Blocker)
2016	Bangkok Glass	3rd	(Thailand) Pornpun Guedpard (Best Setter); (Thailand) Wilavan Apinyapong (Best Outside Spiker); (Thailand) Pleumjit Thinkaow (Best Middle Blocker); (Thailand) Tikamporn Changkeaw (Best Libero)
2015	Bangkok Glass	1st	(Thailand) Pleumjit Thinkaow (Most Valuable Player); (Thailand) Pornpun Guedpard (Best Setter); (Vietnam) Nguyễn Thị Ngọc Hoa (Best Middle Blocker); (Thailand) Tikamporn Changkeaw (Best Libero)
2014	Nakhon Ratchasima	5th	—N/a
2013	Idea Khonkaen	7th	—N/a

- 2020 did not qualify because Outbreak of Covid-19 in the world

== Thailand League clubs in World Championship ==
Season	Club	Place	Awards
2023	TBA		
2023	did not qualify		
2022	did not qualify		
2021	did not qualify		
2020	did not qualify		
2019	did not qualify		
2018	Supreme Chonburi	8th	—N/a
2017	did not qualify		
2016	Bangkok Glass	7th	—N/a
2015	did not qualify		
2014	did not qualify		
2013	did not qualify		

== See also ==
- Men's Volleyball Thailand League
- Volleyball Thai-Denmark Super League
- Women's Volleyball Pro Challenge
