= 2008 FIVB World Grand Prix squads =

This article show all participating team squads at the 2008 FIVB Women's Volleyball World Grand Prix, played by twelve countries with the final round held in Yokohama Arena, Yokohama, Japan.

== Brazil ==
- Head Coach: José Roberto Guimarães

#	Name	Date of birth	Height	Weight	Spike	Block
1	Walewska Oliveira	01.10.1979	190	73	310	290
2	Carolina Albuquerque	25.07.1977	182	76	289	279
3	Marianne Steinbrecher	23.08.1983	188	70	310	290
4	Paula Pequeno	22.01.1982	184	74	302	285
5	Caroline Gattaz	27.07.1981	191	87	304	280
6	Thaisa Menezes	15.05.1987	196	79	316	301
7	Hélia Souza (c)	10.03.1970	173	63	283	264
8	Valeska Menezes	23.04.1976	180	62	302	290
9	Fabiana Claudino	24.01.1985	193	76	314	293
10	Welissa Gonzaga	09.09.1982	179	76	300	287
11	Marcelle Moraes	17.10.1976	181	72	303	289
12	Jaqueline Carvalho	31.12.1983	186	70	302	286
13	Sheilla Castro	01.07.1983	185	64	302	284
14	Fabiana de Oliveira	07.03.1980	169	59	276	266
15	Juliana Castro	30.06.1985	187	75	310	290
16	Natalia Pereira	24.04.1989	183	76	300	288
17	Renata Colombo	25.02.1981	181	78	305	293
18	Joyce Silva	13.06.1984	190	67	311	294
19	Arlene Xavier	20.12.1969	177	74	299	290

== China ==
- Head Coach: Chen Zhonghe

#	Name	Date of birth	Height	Weight	Spike	Block
1	Wang Yimei	11.01.1988	190	90	318	205
2	Feng Kun (c)	28.12.1978	183	75	319	310
3	Yang Hao	21.03.1980	183	75	319	314
4	Liu Yanan	29.09.1980	186	73	320	313
5	Wei Qiuyue	26.09.1988	182	65	305	300
6	Xu Yunli	02.08.1987	196	85	313	306
7	Zhou Suhong	23.04.1979	182	75	313	305
8	Zhang Yuehong	09.11.1975	182	73	324	322
9	Zhao Ruirui	08.10.1981	196	70	326	315
10	Xue Ming	23.02.1987	193	68	322	310
11	Li Juan	15.05.1981	187	73	315	307
12	Song Nina	07.04.1980	179	65	303	293
14	Zhao Yanni	23.10.1988	187	70	310	305
15	Zhang Xian	16.03.1985	167	57	290	286
16	Zhang Na	19.04.1980	180	72	302	292
17	Ma Yunwen	19.10.1986	189	70	315	307
18	Li Shan	21.05.1980	185	72	317	300

== Cuba ==
- Head Coach: Antonio Perdomo

#	Name	Date of birth	Height	Weight	Spike	Block
1	Yumilka Ruiz (c)	08.05.1978	179	62	329	315
2	Yanelis Santos	30.03.1986	183	71	315	312
3	Nancy Carrillo	11.01.1986	190	74	318	315
4	Yenisey González	23.08.1983	193	67	315	312
5	Dayesi Maso	04.04.1990	184	69	314	280
6	Daimí Ramírez	08.10.1983	176	67	305	290
7	Lisbet Arredondo	22.11.1987	181	62	315	312
8	Yaima Ortiz	09.11.1981	179	70	325	313
9	Rachel Sánchez	09.01.1989	188	75	325	320
10	Yusleinis Herrera	12.03.1984	180	67	312	310
11	Liana Mesa Luaces	26.12.1977	179	70	318	307
12	Rosir Calderón	28.12.1984	191	66	330	325
13	Leanny Castañeda	18.10.1986	188	70	325	320
14	Kenia Carcaces	22.01.1986	188	69	308	306
15	Yusidey Silié	11.11.1984	183	80	316	300
16	Ana Lidia Cleger	27.11.1989	183	69	300	285
17	Gyselle Silva	29.10.1991	184	70	302	295
18	Zoila Barros	06.08.1976	188	76	325	312
19	Suramis Acosta	17.07.1987	188	80	300	287

== Dominican Republic ==
- Head Coach: Marcos Kwiek

#	Name	Date of birth	Height	Weight	Spike	Block
1	Annerys Vargas	07.08.1981	194	70	325	315
2	Ana Yorkira Binet	09.02.1992	174	62	267	288
3	Lisvel Elisa Eve	10.09.1991	189	70	250	287
4	Sidarka Núñez	25.06.1984	188	58	312	308
5	Brenda Castillo	05.06.1992	167	55	220	270
6	Carmen Rosa Caso	29.11.1981	168	59	243	241
7	Niverka Marte	19.10.1990	178	71	233	283
8	Gina Del Rosario	12.05.1986	189	61	310	300
9	Nuris Arias	20.05.1973	190	78	315	306
10	Milagros Cabral	17.10.1978	181	63	308	305
11	Jeoselyna Rodríguez	09.12.1991	184	63	242	288
12	Karla Echenique	16.05.1986	181	62	279	273
13	Cindy Rondón	12.11.1988	189	61	312	305
14	Prisilla Rivera	29.12.1984	186	70	312	308
15	Cosiri Rodríguez (c)	30.08.1977	191	72	313	305
16	Marifranchi Rodríguez	29.08.1990	184	68	310	300
17	Altagracia Mambrú	21.01.1989	180	55	312	302
18	Bethania de la Cruz	13.05.1989	188	58	322	305

== Germany ==
- Head Coach: Giovanni Guidetti

#	Name	Date of birth	Height	Weight	Spike	Block
1	Maren Brinker	10.07.1986	184	68	303	295
2	Jennifer Pettke	29.05.1989	186	71	305	295
3	Denise Hanke	31.08.1989	179	58	284	272
4	Kerstin Tzscherlich	15.02.1978	179	72	295	282
5	Berit Kauffeldt	08.07.1990	190	75	308	294
6	Franziska Bremer	27.06.1985	194	61	306	296
7	Saskia Hippe	16.01.1991	185	76	305	292
8	Cornelia Dumler (c)	22.01.1982	180	68	309	285
9	Mareen Apitz	26.03.1987	183	73	295	284
10	Anne Matthes	30.04.1985	182	66	312	295
11	Christiane Fürst	29.03.1985	192	76	305	291
12	Lena Möllers	06.01.1990	188	78	312	297
13	Sabrina Ross	11.04.1980	185	68	300	288
14	Kathy Radzuweit	02.03.1982	196	76	319	300
15	Birgit Thumm	03.07.1980	184	74	310	289
16	Margareta Kozuch	30.10.1986	187	70	309	297
17	Dominice Steffen	17.12.1987	185	70	301	290
18	Corina Ssuschke	09.05.1983	188	70	304	292
19	Karla Borger	22.11.1988	180	61	300	288

== Italy ==
- Head Coach: Massimo Barbolini

#	Name	Date of birth	Height	Weight	Spike	Block
1	Sara Anzanello	30.07.1980	193	78	316	298
2	Valentina Arrighetti	26.01.1985	185	62	294	280
3	Paola Croce	06.03.1978	167	52	290	265
4	Nadia Centoni	19.06.1981	182	63	307	291
5	Taismary Agüero	05.03.1977	177	69	322	300
6	Valentina Fiorin	09.10.1984	187	69	305	287
7	Martina Guiggi	01.05.1984	183	69	315	290
8	Jenny Barazza	24.07.1981	188	77	300	285
9	Manuela Secolo	22.02.1977	180	70	302	279
10	Paola Cardullo	18.03.1982	162	56	275	268
11	Serena Ortolani	07.01.1987	187	63	308	288
12	Francesca Piccinini	10.01.1979	180	75	304	279
13	Francesca Ferretti	15.02.1984	180	70	296	280
14	Eleonora Lo Bianco (c)	22.12.1979	172	70	287	273
15	Antonella Del Core	05.11.1980	180	73	296	279
16	Lucia Bosetti	09.07.1989	176	59	306	286
17	Simona Gioli	17.09.1977	185	72	307	283
18	Giulia Rondon	16.10.1987	189	77	304	280

== Japan ==
- Head Coach: Shoichi Yanagimoto

#	Name	Date of birth	Height	Weight	Spike	Block
1	Megumi Kurihara	31.07.1984	186	69	305	285
2	Asako Tajimi	26.06.1972	180	70	309	304
3	Yoshie Takeshita (c)	18.03.1978	159	52	280	270
4	Kanako Omura	15.12.1976	184	70	319	310
5	Miyuki Takahashi	25.12.1978	170	65	290	285
6	Yuko Sano	26.07.1979	159	54	260	250
7	Sachiko Sugiyama	19.10.1979	184	66	310	305
8	Yuka Sakurai	02.09.1974	167	63	290	275
9	Miyuki Kano	17.05.1977	174	65	298	275
10	Yuki Shoji	19.11.1981	182	66	315	303
11	Erika Araki	03.08.1984	186	79	307	298
12	Saori Kimura	19.08.1986	184	66	298	293
13	Mariko Nishiwaki	17.06.1981	181	72	304	268
14	Yuki Kawai	22.01.1990	168	63	280	275
15	Kana Oyama	19.06.1984	187	84	308	294

== Kazakhstan ==
- Head Coach: Viktor Zhuravlev

#	Name	Date of birth	Height	Weight	Spike	Block
1	Natalya Zhukova	29.03.1980	184	70	305	285
2	Tatyana Pyurova	06.04.1982	182	67	305	295
3	Lyudmila Anarbayeva	12.11.1983	192	76	295	280
4	Olga Karpova	10.06.1980	185	64	300	290
5	Yuliya Kutsko	18.04.1980	191	74	305	295
6	Olga Nassedkina	28.12.1982	191	75	305	295
8	Korinna Ishimtseva	08.02.1984	184	73	280	275
9	Xeniya Ilyuchshenko	29.05.1979	180	70	300	250
10	Yelena Ezau	09.03.1983	175	55	285	275
11	Olga Grushko (c)	07.04.1976	180	70	305	295
12	Irina Zaitseva	25.09.1982	185	66	305	290
13	Yelena Pavlova	12.12.1978	184	70	315	290
16	Inna Matveyeva	12.10.1978	186	74	305	295
17	Stanislava Yavorskaya	23.02.1989	183	70	295	290
18	Sana Jarlagassova	21.07.1989	187	70	300	290
19	Oxana Mikholap	17.04.1977	185	72	290	285

== Poland ==
- Head Coach: Marco Bonitta

#	Name	Date of birth	Height	Weight	Spike	Block
1	Joanna Frackowiak	04.07.1986	185	67	307	293
2	Mariola Zenik	03.07.1982	174	64	300	290
3	Eleonora Dziękiewicz	25.10.1978	185	75	307	295
4	Katarzyna Gajgal	21.09.1981	190	85	300	287
5	Karolina Ciaszkiewicz	07.09.1979	183	73	303	290
6	Anna Podolec	30.10.1985	193	71	318	305
7	Gabriela Wojtowicz	27.11.1988	200	81	324	305
8	Magdalena Godos	12.09.1983	181	67	300	281
9	Agnieszka Bednarek	20.02.1986	185	70	309	292
10	Anna Wozniakowska	02.03.1982	182	74	310	289
11	Anna Baranska	14.05.1984	178	66	308	292
12	Milena Sadurek	18.10.1984	177	65	302	295
13	Milena Rosner (c)	04.01.1980	179	67	307	292
14	Zuzanna Efimienko	08.08.1989	196	74	313	304
15	Agata Sawicka	17.01.1985	180	64	295	277
16	Klaudia Kaczorowska	20.12.1988	184	68	303	281
17	Joanna Kaczor	16.09.1984	188	64	305	290
18	Katarzyna Skorupa	16.09.1984	182	69	302	296
19	Berenika Tomsia	11.03.1988	188	72	310	302

== Thailand ==
- Head Coach: Nataphon Srisamutnak

#	Name	Date of birth	Height	Weight	Spike	Block
1	Rattanaporn Sanuanram	09.04.1980	180	66	308	297
2	Konwika Apinyapong	24.11.1987	167	55	303	293
3	Saymai Paladsrichuay	04.08.1987	180	74	308	291
4	Siriporn Sooksen	09.02.1988	180	66	308	292
5	Pleumjit Thinkaow	09.11.1983	180	63	298	281
6	Onuma Sittirak	13.06.1986	175	72	304	285
7	Narumon Khanan	26.01.1983	180	66	311	289
8	Utaiwan Kaensing	07.09.1988	189	86	310	295
9	Pornthip Santrong	11.08.1988	178	60	314	295
10	Wilavan Apinyapong (c)	06.06.1990	174	68	294	282
11	Amporn Hyapha	19.05.1985	180	70	301	290
12	Marai Kongrom	18.11.1989	180	70	242	236
13	Nootsara Tomkom	07.07.1985	169	57	289	278
14	Kittiyakorn Phansamdaeng	04.01.1988	175	63	294	280
15	Malika Kanthong	08.01.1987	177	63	292	278
16	Patcharee Deesamer	03.02.1989	180	74	306	293
17	Wanna Buakaew	02.01.1981	172	54	292	277
18	Em-orn Phanusit	25.03.1988	179	70	302	291
19	Tapaphaipun Chaisri	29.11.1989	168	60	295	276

== Turkey ==
- Head Coach: Alessandro Chiappini

#	Name	Date of birth	Height	Weight	Spike	Block
1	Güldeniz Önal	25.03.1986	182	67	306	290
2	Gülden Kayalar	05.12.1980	168	55	269	257
3	Nihan Yeldan	07.02.1982	170	58	280	276
4	Seray Altay	25.08.1987	182	62	310	270
5	Ergül Avci	24.07.1987	190	75	300	270
6	Gökçen Denkel	08.02.1985	192	73	304	296
7	Duygu Bal	25.03.1987	190	68	305	275
8	Bahar Toksoy	06.02.1988	189	69	310	276
9	Deniz Hakyemez	03.02.1983	187	72	300	295
10	Kırdar Gözde	26.06.1985	180	63	295	283
11	Pelin Çelik	23.05.1982	173	61	278	268
12	Esra Gümüş (c)	02.10.1982	181	76	290	281
13	Neriman Özsoy	13.07.1988	188	73	310	290
14	Eda Erdem	22.06.1987	187	75	308	302
15	Elif Ağca	10.02.1984	186	72	292	290
16	Seda Tokatlıoğlu	25.06.1986	192	64	303	297
17	Naz Aydemir	14.08.1990	186	68	304	300

== United States ==
- Head Coach: Lang Ping

#	Name	Date of birth	Height	Weight	Spike	Block
1	Ogonna Nnamani	29.07.1983	185	80	315	305
2	Danielle Scott	01.10.1972	188	84	325	302
3	Tayyiba Haneef	23.03.1979	201	80	318	299
4	Lindsey Berg	16.07.1980	173	81	285	270
5	Stacy Sykora	24.06.1977	176	61	305	295
6	Nicole Davis	24.04.1982	167	73	284	266
7	Heather Bown	29.11.1978	188	90	301	290
8	Cynthia Barboza	07.02.1987	183	73	310	285
9	Jennifer Joines	23.11.1982	191	82	315	301
10	Kim Glass	18.08.1984	190	75	314	299
11	Robyn Ah Mow (c)	15.09.1975	172	68	291	281
12	Nancy Metcalf	12.11.1978	186	73	314	292
13	Heather Hughes	22.06.1986	188	75	308	296
14	Kim Willoughby	07.11.1980	178	75	315	300
15	Logan Tom	25.05.1981	186	80	306	297
16	Tracy Stalls	12.06.1984	188	79	307	292
17	Angela McGinnis	03.11.1986	188	70	296	285
18	Kristin Richards	30.06.1985	182	61	300	284
19	Foluke Akinradewo	05.10.1987	191	79	351	300
