= Anongporn Promrat =

Thai volleyball player (born 1992)

Personal information
- Nickname: Aom
- Nationality: Thai
- Born: 2 March 1992 (age 34); Phitsanulok, Thailand
- Height: 1.80 m (5 ft 11 in)
- Weight: 70 kg (154 lb)

Volleyball information
- Position: Middle Blocker
- Current club: Khonkaen Star
- Number: 12

Career
| Years | Teams |
|---|---|
| 2010–2015 | Ayutthaya A.T.C.C |
| 2015–2017 | Bangkok Glass |
| 2018–2019 | Quint Air Force |
| 2019–2020 | Nakhon Ratchasima |
| 2020–Present | Khonkaen Star |

National team
| 2010–2011 | U20 Thailand |

Anongporn Promrat (Thai: อนงค์พร พรหมรัด; born 2 March 1992) is a Thai female volleyball player. She was part of the Thailand women's national volleyball team.

She participated in the 2010 FIVB Volleyball World Grand Prix.

== Awards ==
=== Clubs ===
- 2013 Thai-Denmark Super League - Bronze medal, with Ayutthaya A.T.C.C
- 2013–14 Thailand League - Bronze medal, with Ayutthaya A.T.C.C
- 2014 Thai-Denmark Super League - Champion, with Ayutthaya A.T.C.C
- 2014–15 Thailand League - Runner-up, with Ayutthaya A.T.C.C
- 2015 Thai-Denmark Super League - Bronze medal, with Ayutthaya A.T.C.C
- 2015–2016 Thailand League - Champion, with Bangkok Glass
- 2016 Thai-Denmark Super League - Champion, with Bangkok Glass
- 2016–17 Thailand League - Runner-up, with Bangkok Glass
- 2017 Thai-Denmark Super League - Runner-up, with Bangkok Glass
- 2020 Thailand League - Bronze medal, with Nakhon Ratchasima
