= Kannika Thipachot =

Thai volleyball player (born 1993)

Personal information
- Full name: Kannika Thipachot
- Nickname: Lex
- Nationality: Thai
- Born: May 3, 1993 (age 33); Udonthani, Thailand
- Height: 1.68 m (5 ft 6 in)
- Weight: 65 kg (143 lb)
- Spike: 285 cm (112 in)
- Block: 273 cm (107 in)

Volleyball information
- Position: Outside hitter
- Current club: Khonkaen Star
- Number: 29

National team
2014, 2022	Thailand

Kannika Thipachot (Thai: กรรณิการ์ ธิปะโชติ), Nickname is Lex. (Thai: เล็ก). She is a Thai indoor volleyball player. She plays as an outside hitter. She is a member of the Thailand women's national volleyball team in 2014.

Kannika Thipachot is The tournament's Best Scorer of Shakey's V-league 2013 in Philippines.

== Graduation ==
- Ayutthaya Technological Commercial College.
- Bachelor's degree from Sripatum University
- Master's degree from Sripatum University

== Clubs ==
- (Thailand) Ayutthaya A.T.C.C (2008–2015)
- (Philippines) Cagayan Valley (2012–2013)
- (Philippines) Power Smashers (2017)
- (Thailand) Khonkaen Star (2015–2021)
- (Thailand) Nakhon Ratchasima (2021)
- (Thailand) Supreme Volleyball Club (2021–2024)
- (Vietnam) Hóa chất Đức Giang (2023) (loan)
- (Thailand) Khonkaen Star (2024–2025)
- (Vietnam) IMP - Bắc Ninh (2025–2026)
- (Thailand) Khonkaen Star (2026–2027)

== Awards ==
=== Individuals ===
- 2012–13 Thailand League – "Best Scorer"
- 2013 Shakey's V-League – "Best Scorer"
- 2015 Nonsi Games 42nd – "Most Valuable Player"
- 2016 CH7 Championship – "Most Valuable Player"
- 2017 Suranaree Games 44th – "Most Valuable Player"
- 2018 CH7 Championship – "Best Outside Hitter"
- 2021–22 Thailand League – "Best Outside Hitter"
- 2024–25 Thailand League – "Best Outside Hitter"

=== Clubs ===
- 2009–10 Thailand League – Champion, with Ayutthaya A.T.C.C
- 2010–11 Thailand League – Silver, with Ayutthaya A.T.C.C
- 2013–14 Thailand League – Bronze medal, with Ayutthaya A.T.C.C
- 2013 Shakey's V-league - Champions, with Cagayan Valley
- 2013 Thai-Denmark Super League – Bronze medal, with Ayutthaya A.T.C.C
- 2014 Thai–Denmark Super League – Champions, with Ayutthaya A.T.C.C
- 2015 Thai-Denmark Super League – Bronze medal, with Ayutthaya A.T.C.C
- 2019 Thai–Denmark Super League – Bronze medal, with Khonkaen Star
- 2021 Asian Women's Club Volleyball Championship – Silver, with Nakhon Ratchasima
- 2021 SAT Thailand Volleyball Invitation Sisaket – Champion, with Supreme Chonburi

=== University Club ===
- 2015 Nonsi Games 42nd — Champion, with Sripatum Volleyball Club
- 2015 CH7 Championship 2015 — Silver, with Sripatum
- 2016 CH7 Championship 2016 — Champion, with Sripatum
- 2017 Suranaree Games 44th — Champion, with Sripatum
- 2017 CH7 Championship 2017 — Silver, with Sripatum
- 2018 CH7 Championship 2018 — Champion, with Sripatum
- 2019 UBRU Games 46th — Silver, with Sripatum

=== Other ===
- (Thailand) 2011 - "PEA" Women's Volleyball Championship 7th - Champion
- (Malaysia) 2010 - Volleyball Asean School Games - Champion
- (Vietnam) 2011 - Volleyball Asian School Corls - Champion
- (Laos) 2012 - Volleyball Asean University - Silver
- (Vietnam) 2014 - VTV International Women's Volleyball Cup - Silver

== Royal decoration ==
- 2023 – Silver Medalist (Seventh Class) of The Most Admirable Order of the Direkgunabhorn
