= Surasawadee Boonyuen =

Thai indoor volleyball player (born 1991)

Personal information
- Nickname: Lek
- Nationality: Thailand
- Born: October 31, 1991 (age 35); Udonthani, Thailand
- Height: 1.79 m (5 ft 10 in)
- Weight: 72 kg (159 lb)

Volleyball information
- Position: Opposite
- Current club: Idea Khonkaen
- Number: 21

National team
2008–2009	U20 Thailand

Surasawadee Boonyuen (Thai: สุรัสวดี บุญยืน, born October 31, 1991, in Udonthani) is a Thai indoor volleyball player. She is a member of the Thailand women's national volleyball team. She placed in fifth place in the 2008 Asian Junior Championship.

== Clubs ==
- (Thailand) Nakhonnonthaburi (2009–2012)
- (Thailand) Kathu Phuket (2012–2013)
- (Thailand) Ayutthaya A.T.C.C (2013–2015)
- (Thailand) Idea Khonkaen (2015–present)

== Awards ==
=== Clubs ===
- 2011–12 Thailand League - Champion, with Nakornnontthaburi
- 2013 Thai–Denmark Super League - Bronze medal, with Ayutthaya A.T.C.C
- 2013–14 Thailand League - Bronze medal, with Ayutthaya A.T.C.C
- 2014 Thai–Denmark Super League - Champion. with Ayutthaya A.T.C.C
- 2016 Thai–Denmark Super League - Bronze medal, with Idea Khonkaen
- 2019 Thai–Denmark Super League - Third, with Khonkaen Star
- 2020 Thailand League – Runner-up, with Khonkaen Star
