= 2012–13 Women's Volleyball Thailand League =

- League: Thailand League
- Sport: Volleyball
- Duration: December 2012 – May 2013
- Games: 56 (Regular Season)
- Teams: 8
- Season champions: Idea Khonkaen (2nd title)
- Season MVP: (Thailand) Tapaphaipun Chaisri

Women's Volleyball Thailand League seasons
- ← 2011–12 2013–14 →

The Women's Volleyball Thailand League is the highest level of Thailand club volleyball in the 2012–13 season and the 8th edition.

== Teams ==
- Ayutthaya A.T.C.C
- Idea Khonkaen
- Nakhonnonthaburi
- Nakhon Ratchasima
- Sisaket
- Suan Sunandha
- Supreme Nakhonsi
- Samut Prakan

== Ranking ==
Pos	Team	Pld	W	L	Pts	SW	SL	SR	SPW	SPL	SPR
1	Idea Khonkaen	14	14	0	40	42	5	8.400	1153	885	1.303
2	Nakhonnonthaburi	14	10	4	30	33	16	2.063	1144	1006	1.137
3	Nakhon Ratchasima	14	10	4	28	33	19	1.737	1177	1095	1.075
4	Ayutthaya A.T.C.C	14	9	5	29	33	21	1.571	1207	1116	1.082
5	Supreme Nakhonsi	14	6	8	16	21	29	0.724	1059	1113	0.951
6	Sisaket	14	5	9	16	19	29	0.655	988	1083	0.912
7	Suan Sunandha	14	2	12	8	12	37	0.324	956	1142	0.837
8	Samut Prakan	14	0	14	1	5	42	0.119	902	1145	0.788

== Results ==
Date	Time		Score		Set 1	Set 2	Set 3	Set 4	Set 5	Total	Report
3 Nov		Nakhonnonthaburi	3–0	Sisaket	25–21	25–20	25–14			75–55	
4 Nov		Nakhonnonthaburi	3–0	Suan Sunandha	25–17	25–18	25–15			75–50	
4 Nov		Ayutthaya A.T.C.C	3–0	Supreme Nakhonsi	25–15	25–18	25–15			75–48	
6 Nov		Nakhonnonthaburi	3–2	Ayutthaya A.T.C.C	21–25	25–17	21–25	25–20	15–4	107–91	
17 Nov		Samut Prakan	0–3	Idea Khonkaen	19–25	20–25	15–25			54–75	
18 Nov		Suan Sunandha	0–3	Nakhon Ratchasima	19–25	11–25	15–25			45–75	
24 Nov		Supreme Nakhonsi	0–3	Nakhonnonthaburi	18–25	14–25	15–25			47–75	
25 Nov		Supreme Nakhonsi	1–3	Idea Khonkaen	13–25	32–30	23–25	20–25		88–105	
25 Nov		Ayutthaya A.T.C.C	3–1	Suan Sunandha	25–21	12–25	25–15	25–15		87–76	

Date	Time		Score		Set 1	Set 2	Set 3	Set 4	Set 5	Total	Report
1 Dec		Ayutthaya A.T.C.C	3–0	Sisaket	25–16	25–12	25–15			75–43	
1 Dec		Nakhon Ratchasima	1–3	Nakhonnonthaburi	25–23	22–25	10–25	18–25		75–98	
2 Dec		Samut Prakan	0–3	Supreme Nakhonsi	14–25	18–25	22–25			54–75	
2 Dec		Idea Khonkaen	3–0	Nakhonnonthaburi	25–19	26–24	25–19			76–62	
5 Dec		Samut Prakan	2–3	Nakhon Ratchasima	21–25	25–18	23–25	25–17	15–17	109–102	
5 Dec		Sisaket	2–3	Idea Khonkaen	25–23	16–25	25–20	17–25	10–15	93–108	
5 Dec		Suan Sunandha	2–3	Supreme Nakhonsi	25–19	25–19	12–25	20–25	10–15	92–103	
8 Dec		Ayutthaya A.T.C.C	3–0	Samut Prakan	25–18	25–18	25–20			75–56	
22 Dec		Sisaket	3–1	Supreme Nakhonsi	22–25	25–12	25–16	25–18		97–71	
22 Dec		Idea Khonkaen	3–0	Nakhon Ratchasima	25–22	25–18	25–18			75–58	
23 Dec		Sisaket	3–0	Suan Sunandha	25–15	25–8	25–18			75–41	

Date	Time		Score		Set 1	Set 2	Set 3	Set 4	Set 5	Total	Report
20 Jan		Nakhon Ratchasima	3–0	Sisaket	25–17	25–21	25–15			75–53	
20 Jan		Nakhonnonthaburi	3–0	Samut Prakan	25–18	25–18	25–18			75–54	
20 Jan		Idea Khonkaen	3–0	Ayutthaya A.T.C.C	25–19	25–19	25–13			75–51	
26 Jan		Samut Prakan	1–3	Suan Sunandha	21–25	22–25	25–22	15–25		83–97	
26 Jan		Nakhon Ratchasima	3–0	Ayutthaya A.T.C.C	25–18	25–21	25–19			75–58	

Date	Time		Score		Set 1	Set 2	Set 3	Set 4	Set 5	Total	Report
2 Feb		Suan Sunandha	0–3	Idea Khonkaen	16–25	25–27	22–25			63–77	
2 Feb		Sisaket	3–0	Samut Prakan	25–18	25–22	25–20			75–60	
3 Feb		Supreme Nakhonsi	3–2	Nakhon Ratchasima	24–26	25–23	26–24	19–25	15–8	109–106	
16 Feb		Idea Khonkaen	3–0	Supreme Nakhonsi	25–22	25–20	25–15			75–57	
17 Feb		Idea Khonkaen	3–0	Samut Prakan	28–26	25–15	25–15			78–56	
20 Feb		Suan Sunandha	0–3	Nakhonnonthaburi	20–25	21–25	23–25			64–75	
23 Feb		Ayutthaya A.T.C.C	2–3	Idea Khonkaen	25–20	26–24	16–25	18–25	12–15	97–109	
24 Feb		Sisaket	0–3	Nakhonnonthaburi	20–25	24–26	18–25			62–76	

Date	Time		Score		Set 1	Set 2	Set 3	Set 4	Set 5	Total	Report
2 Mar		Nakhon Ratchasima	3–1	Suan Sunandha	25–20	25–17	23–25	25–21		98–83	
2 Mar		Sisaket	1–3	Ayutthaya A.T.C.C	27–25	14–25	27–29	15–25		83–104	
3 Mar		Nakhon Ratchasima	3–0	Samut Prakan	25–16	25–21	25–15			75–52	
6 Mar		Ayutthaya A.T.C.C	3–1	Nakhonnonthaburi	23–25	25–18	25–20	25–22		98–85	
6 Mar		Suan Sunandha	0–3	Sisaket	24–26	23–25	15–25			62–76	
9 Mar		Supreme Nakhonsi	1–3	Ayutthaya A.T.C.C	25–22	16–25	20–25	22–25		83–97	
10 Mar		Supreme Nakhonsi	3–0	Samut Prakan	25–19	25–18	25–17			75–54	
10 Mar		Idea Khonkaen	3–0	Suan Sunandha	25–14	25–19	25–14			75–47	
16 Mar		Nakhon Ratchasima	3–0	Supreme Nakhonsi	25–22	26–24	25–21			76–67	
16 Mar		Samut Prakan	1–3	Sisaket	17–25	16–25	25–20	27–29		85–99	
17 Mar		Nakhon Ratchasima	0–3	Idea Khonkaen	17–25	20–25	15–25			52–75	
30 Mar		Ayutthaya A.T.C.C	2–3	Nakhon Ratchasima	25–23	21–25	19–25	25–20	21–23	111–116	
31 Mar		Samut Prakan	1–3	Suan Sunandha	19–25	24–26	25–19	16–25		84–95	
31 Mar		Nakhonnonthaburi	3–0	Supreme Nakhonsi	25–22	25–17	26–24			76–63	
31 Mar		Idea Khonkaen	3–0	Sisaket	25–19	25–18	25–15			75–52	

Date	Time		Score		Set 1	Set 2	Set 3	Set 4	Set 5	Total	Report
6 Apr		Sisaket	1–3	Nakhon Ratchasima	19–25	24–26	25–19	16–25		84–95	
7 Apr		Samut Prakan	1–3	Ayutthaya A.T.C.C	14–25	21–25	15–25			50–75	
9 Apr		Nakhonnonthaburi	2–3	Nakhon Ratchasima	29–27	23–25	28–26	19–25	14–16	113–119	
11 Apr		Nakhonnonthaburi	3–0	Samut Prakan	25–20	25–17	25–11			75–48	
20 Apr		Samut Prakan	1–3	Suan Sunandha	19–25	24–26	25–19	16–25		84–95	
20 Apr		Supreme Nakhonsi	3–0	Suan Sunandha	25–18	25–16	25–20			75–54	
21 Apr		Supreme Nakhonsi	3–1	Sisaket	25–19	23–25	25–13	25–20		98–77	
21 Apr		Nakhonnonthaburi	?–3	Idea Khonkaen							Score missing
27 Apr		Suan Sunandha	2–3	Ayutthaya A.T.C.C	19–25	25–27	25–22	25–22	15–17	109–113	
28 Apr		Suan Sunandha	3–?	Samut Prakan							Score missing

== Final standing ==
Rank	Team
1st place, gold medalist(s)	Idea Khonkaen
2nd place, silver medalist(s)	Nakhonnonthaburi
3rd place, bronze medalist(s)	Nakhon Ratchasima
4	Ayutthaya A.T.C.C
5	Supreme Nakhonsi
6	Sisaket
7	Suan Sunandha
8	Samut Prakan

Qualified for the 2013 Asian Club Championship and 2013 Thai-Denmark Super League
Qualified for the 2013 Thai-Denmark Super League
Qualified for the 2013 Thai-Denmark Super League and relegated to Group 2

== Awards ==
Award	Winner	Team
MVP	(Thailand) Tapaphaipun Chaisri	Idea Khonkaen
Best scorer	(Thailand) Kannika Thipachot	Ayutthaya A.T.C.C
Best spiker	(Thailand) Em-orn Phanusit	Idea Khonkaen
Best blocker	(Thailand) Hattaya Bamrungsuk	Nakhon Ratchasima
Best server	(Thailand) Ajcharaporn Kongyot	Supreme Nakhonsi
Best setter	(Thailand) Soraya Phomla	Ayutthaya A.T.C.C
Best digger	(Thailand) Yupa Sanitklang	Ayutthaya A.T.C.C
Best receiver	(Thailand) Tikamporn Changkeaw	Idea Khonkaen
Best libero	(Thailand) Tikamporn Changkeaw	Idea Khonkaen
