= Kannika Sitthipaet =

Thai volleyball player

Personal information
- Nickname: Mei
- Nationality: Thailand
- Born: 3 August 1994 (age 32)
- Height: 1.66 m (5 ft 5 in)
- Weight: 60 kg (132 lb)
- Spike: 258 cm (102 in)
- Block: 251 cm (99 in)

Volleyball information
- Position: Libero
- Current club: Khonkaen Star
- Number: 1

Career
Years	Teams
2012–2015; 2015–Prasent	Ayutthaya A.T.C.C; Khonkaen Star

National team
2011–2013	Thailand U-20

Kannika Sitthipaet (Thai: กรรณิกา สิทธิแพทย์; (born 3 August 1994) is a Thai volleyball player. She was part of the Thailand U-20 women's national volleyball team.

== Club ==
- (Thailand) Ayutthaya A.T.C.C (2012–2015)
- (Thailand) Khonkaen Star (2015–present)

== Awards ==
=== Clubs ===
- 2014 Thai–Denmark Super League - Champion, with Ayutthaya A.T.C.C
- 2015 Thai–Denmark Super League - Third, with Idea Khonkaen
- 2016 Thai–Denmark Super League - Third, with Idea Khonkaen
- 2019 Thai–Denmark Super League - Third, with Thai-Denmark Khonkaen Star
- 2020 Thailand League – Runner-up, with Khonkaen Star
