= 2006 Women's Volleyball Thailand League =

2006 Women's Thailand League
- League: Thailand League
- Sport: Volleyball
- Teams: 8
- Season champions: Nakhon Ratchasima
- Runners-up: Phuket
- Season MVP: Wilavan Apinyapong

Women's Thailand League seasons
- 2007 →

The 2006 Women's Volleyball Thailand League was the inaugural season of the Women's Thailand League, the top Thai professional league for volleyball clubs. A total of 8 teams competed in the league.

The title was won by Nakhon Ratchasima, for a record first time.

== Final standing ==
Rank	Team
1st place, gold medalist(s)	Nakhon Ratchasima
2nd place, silver medalist(s)	Phuket
3rd place, bronze medalist(s)	Khonkaen
4	Nonthaburi
5	Bangkok
6	Lopburi
7	Samut Prakan
8	Kamphaeng Phet

== Awards ==
- Most valuable player

(Thailand) Wilavan Apinyapong (Nakhon Ratchasima)

- Best scorer

(Thailand) Saymai Paladsrichuay (Khonkaen)
(Thailand) Amporn Hyapha (Phuket)
(Thailand) Sirintra Srisuma (Lopburi)

- Best spiker

(Thailand) Rattanaporn Sanuanram (Phuket)
(Thailand) Amporn Hyapha (Phuket)
(Thailand) Wilavan Apinyapong (Nakhon Ratchasima)

- Best server

(Thailand) Saymai Paladsrichuay (Khonkaen)
(Thailand) Konwika Apinyapong (Nakhon Ratchasima)
(Thailand) Amporn Hyapha (Phuket)

- Best Middle Blockers

(Thailand) Sunisa Jadmee (Lopburi)
(Thailand) Khwanjira Yuttakrai (Nonthaburi)
(Thailand) Pleumjit Thinkaow (Bangkok)

- Best setter

(Thailand) Nootsara Tomkom (Kamphaeng Phet)
(Thailand) Kamonporn Sukmak (Nonthaburi)
(Thailand) Waraporn Poomjaroen (Phuket)

- Best libero

(Thailand) Tapaphaipun Chaisri (Khonkaen)
(Thailand) Chidchanok Songmanee (Lopburi)
(Thailand) Chadaporn Tongree (Nonthaburi)
