= Piyatida Lasungnern =

Thai volleyball player (born 1990)

Piyatida Thiratchirot

Personal information
- Nationality: Thailand
- Born: 23 October 1990 (age 36); Nakhon Ratchasima, Thailand
- Height: 1.75 m (5 ft 9 in)
- Weight: 67 kg (148 lb)
- Spike: 290 cm (114 in)
- Block: 280 cm (110 in)

Volleyball information
- Position: Opposite
- Current club: Nakhon Ratchasima
- Number: 9

Career
Years	Teams
2014–2016	Nakhon Ratchasima

National team
2009	Thailand

Piyatida Thiratchirot (Thai: ปิยธิดา ธีรัชจิโรช; born 23 October 1990) is a Thai volleyball player. She was part of the Thailand women's national volleyball team.

She participated in the 2009 FIVB Volleyball World Grand Prix.

== Awards ==
=== Clubs ===
- 2014 Thai-Denmark Super League - Runner-Up, with Nakhon Ratchasima
- 2016 Thai-Denmark Super League – Bronze medal, with Nakhon Ratchasima
- 2017–18 Thailand League - Runner-Up, with Nakhon Ratchasima
- 2018 Thai-Denmark Super League - Bronze medal, with Nakhon Ratchasima
