= Soraya Phomla =

Thai indoor volleyball player (born 1992)

Personal information
- Nickname: So
- Nationality: Thai
- Born: August 6, 1992 (age 34); Chiang Rai, Thailand
- Height: 1.69 m (5 ft 7 in)
- Weight: 60 kg (132 lb)
- Spike: 280 cm (110 in)
- Block: 270 cm (106 in)

Volleyball information
- Position: Setter
- Current club: Nakhon Ratchasima
- Number: 25

National team
2011, 2014–2021	Thailand
Honours
Women's volleyball
Representing Thailand
Asian Cup Championship
Bronze medal – third place	2016 Vinh Phuc	Team

Soraya Phomla (Thai: โสรยา พรมหล้า) is a Thai indoor volleyball player who plays as setter. Her nickname is So (Thai: โส).

Soraya is a member of the Thailand women's national volleyball team in 2014 and 2016.

== Early life ==
Soraya Phomla was born on August 6, 1992. Her hometown is Pa Tan, Thoeng (now Khun Tan), Chaing Rai, Thailand.

=== Graduation ===
- Patan Municipality School
- WatYaiChaiMongKol School
- Ayutthaya Technological Commercial College
- Bachelor's degree from Sripatum University
- Current studying for master's degree from Sripatum University

== Clubs ==
- (Thailand) Ayutthaya ATCC (2010–2015)
- (Philippines) Cagayan Valley (2012–2013)
- (Thailand) Idea Khonkaen (2015–2016)
- (Thailand) Supreme Chonburi (2016–2024)
- (Kazakhstan) Gracia-KZ (2024)
- (Thailand) Khonkaenstar (2025)
- (Thailand) Nakhon Ratchasima (2025)

== Awards ==
=== Individuals ===
- 2011–12 Thailand League "Best Server"
- 2012–13 Thailand League "Best Setter"
- 2013–14 Thailand League "Best Setter"
- 2013 Shakey's V-league "Most Valuable Player"
- 2013 Shakey's V-league "Best Setter"
- 2014 Thai-Denmark Super League "Most Valuable Player"
- 2015–16 Thailand League "Best Setter"
- 2016 VTV Cup Championship "Best Setter"
- 2016–17 Thailand League "Best Setter"
- 2017–18 Thailand League "Best Setter"

=== Clubs ===
- 2010–11 Thailand League - Champion, with Krungkao Mektec
- 2013 Shakey's V-league - Champion, with Cagayan Valley
- 2014 Thai–Denmark Super League - Champion, with Ayutthaya A.T.C.C
- 2014–15 Thailand League - Runner-Up, with Ayutthaya A.T.C.C
- 2016–17 Thailand League - Champion, with Supreme Chonburi
- 2017 Thai–Denmark Super League - Champion, with Supreme Chonburi
- 2017 Asian Club Championship - Champion, with Supreme Chonburi
- 2017–18 Thailand League - Champion, with Supreme Chonburi
- 2018 Thai–Denmark Super League - Champion, with Supreme Chonburi
- 2018–19 Thailand League - Runner-Up, with Supreme Chonburi
- 2019 Thai–Denmark Super League - Champion, with Supreme Chonburi
- 2019 Asian Club Championship - Runner-Up, with Supreme Chonburi
- 2021 Asian Club Championship - Bronze medal, with Supreme Chonburi
- 2021 SAT Volleyball Invitation in Sisaket - Champion, with Supreme Chonburi

=== University Team (SPU) ===
- 2015 CH7 Championship 2015 - Runner-Up, with SPU Volleyball Club
- 2016 CH7 Championship 2016 - Champion, with SPU Volleyball Club
- 2017 CH7 Championship 2017 - Runner-Up, with SPU Volleyball Club
- 2018 CH7 Championship 2018 - Champion, with SPU Volleyball Club

== National team ==
=== Senior team ===
- 2016 Asian Cup - Bronze medal

=== U-20 ===
- 2008 Asian Cup - Bronze medal
