= Nuttaporn Sanitklang =

Thai volleyball player

Personal information
- Nickname: Yu
- Nationality: Thai
- Born: August 14, 1991 (age 35); Nakhon Ratchasima, Thailand
- Height: 1.66 m (5 ft 5 in)
- Weight: 60 kg (132 lb)
- Spike: 275 cm (108 in)
- Block: 260 cm (102 in)

Volleyball information
- Position: Libero
- Current club: Nakhon Ratchasima
- Number: 22 (National team), 1 (Club)

National team
2014–2022	Thailand
Honours
Women's volleyball
Representing Thailand
Montreux Volley Masters
Silver medal – second place	2016 Switzerland	Team
Asian Championship
Silver medal – second place	2019 Seoul
Asian Cup
Bronze medal – third place	2016 Vinh Phuc	Team
Southeast Asian Games
Gold medal – first place	2019 Philippines	Team

Yupa Sanitklang (Thai: ณัฎฐพร สนิทกลาง, born August 14, 1991) is a Thai indoor volleyball player. She is a current member of the Thailand women's national volleyball team.

== Career ==
She participated at the 2016 World Grand Prix and 2016 Nations League.

== Clubs ==
- (Thailand) Ayutthaya A.T.C.C (2006–2015)
- (Thailand) Nakhon Ratchasima (2015–present)

== Awards ==
=== Individuals ===
- 2010 Thailand League – "Best Receiver"
- 2012–13 Thailand League – "Best Digger"
- 2013–14 Thailand League – "Best Receiver"
- 2015–16 Thailand League – "Best Libero"

=== Clubs ===
- 2008–09 Thailand League – Runner-up, with Krungkao Mektec
- 2009–10 Thailand League – Champion, with Krungkao Mektec
- 2010–11 Thailand League – Runner-up, with Krungkao Mektec
- 2014 Thai–Denmark Super League – Champion, with Ayutthaya A.T.C.C
- 2014–15 Thailand League – Runner-up, with Ayutthaya A.T.C.C
- 2017–18 Thailand League – Runner-up, with Nakhon Ratchasima
- 2018–19 Thailand League – Champion, with Nakhon Ratchasima
