= Kamonporn Sukmak =

Thai volleyball player

Personal information
- Full name: Kamonporn Sukmak
- Nickname: Yui
- Born: February 29, 1988 (age 38); Suphan Buri, Thailand
- Height: 1.73 m (5 ft 8 in)
- Weight: 63 kg (139 lb)

Volleyball information
- Position: Setter

National team
2006–2012	Thailand
Honours
Women's volleyball
Representing Thailand
Southeast Asian Games
Gold medal – first place	2009 Vientiane	Team
Gold medal – first place	2011 Palembang/Jakarta	Team

Kamonporn Sukmak (Thai: กมลพร สุขมาก; RTGS: Kamonphon Sukmak, born February 29, 1988) is a member of the Thailand women's national volleyball team.

== Career ==
Kamonporn played the 2010 Club World Championship and ranked in fifth place with Federbrau and she also played the 2011 Club World Championship with Chang and also ranked fifth.

== Clubs ==
- (Thailand) Federbrau (2008–2009)
- (Thailand) Chang (2010–2011)
- (Thailand) Sisaket-Narathiwat (2011–2013)
- (Thailand) Suansunantha VC (2013–2014)
- (Thailand) Rattana Bundit University (2014–2015)

== Awards ==
=== Individual ===
- 2003 Asian Youth Championship "Best Setter"
- 2006 Thailand League "Best Setter"

=== Clubs ===
- 2011 Asian Club Championship - Champion with Chang

== National team ==
- 2008 Asian Cup Championship - Bronze Medal
- 2009 Asian Championship - Gold Medal
- 2010 Asian Cup Championship - Silver Medal
