= Tikamporn Changkeaw =

Thai indoor volleyball player (born 1984)

Personal information
- Nickname: Aom
- Nationality: Thai
- Born: December 12, 1984 (age 41) Suphanburi, Thailand
- Height: 1.68 m (5 ft 6 in)
- Weight: 62 kg (137 lb)
- Spike: 260 cm (102 in)
- Block: 252 cm (99 in)

Volleyball information
- Position: Libero
- Current club: Diamond Food
- Number: 2

National team
- Years: Team
- 2014, 2019, 2021: Thailand
Honours
Women's volleyball
Representing Thailand
Asian Championship
Silver medal – second place	2019 Seoul

Tikamporn Changkeaw (Thai: ฑิฆัมพร ช้างเขียว, born December 12, 1984, in Suphanburi) is a Thai indoor volleyball player. She is a member of the Thailand women's national volleyball team.

== Clubs ==
- (Thailand) Idea Khonkaen (2008–2013)
- (Thailand) Sisaket (2013–2014)
- (Thailand) Bangkok Glass (2014–2018)
- (Thailand) Nakhon Ratchasima (2018–2019)
- (Thailand) Khonkaen Star (2019–2020)
- (Thailand) Diamond Food (2020–)

== Awards ==
=== Individuals ===
- 2012–13 Thailand League – "Best Libero"
- 2012–13 Thailand League – "Best Receiver"
- 2013–14 Thailand League – "Best Libero"
- 2014 VTV International Cup – "Best Libero"
- 2015 Asian Club Championship – "Best Libero"
- 2016 Asian Club Championship – "Best Libero"
- 2020 Thailand League – "Best Libero"

=== Clubs ===
- 2012–13 Thailand League – Champion, with Idea Khonkaen
- 2013 Thai–Denmark Super League – Champion, with Idea Khonkaen
- 2013–14 Thailand League – Runner-up, with Sisaket
- 2014–15 Thailand League – Champion, with Bangkok Glass
- 2015 Thai-Denmark Super League – Champion, with Bangkok Glass
- 2015–16 Thailand League – Champion, with Bangkok Glass
- 2016 Thai–Denmark Super League - Champion, with Bangkok Glass
- 2016–17 Thailand League – Runner-up, with Bangkok Glass
- 2018–19 Thailand League – Champion, with Nakhon Ratchasima
- 2015 Asian Club Championship – Champion, with Bangkok Glass
- 2016 Asian Club Championship – Bronze medal, with Bangkok Glass
- 2020 Thailand League – Runner-up, with Khonkaen Star
