= Tapaphaipun Chaisri =

Thai volleyball player

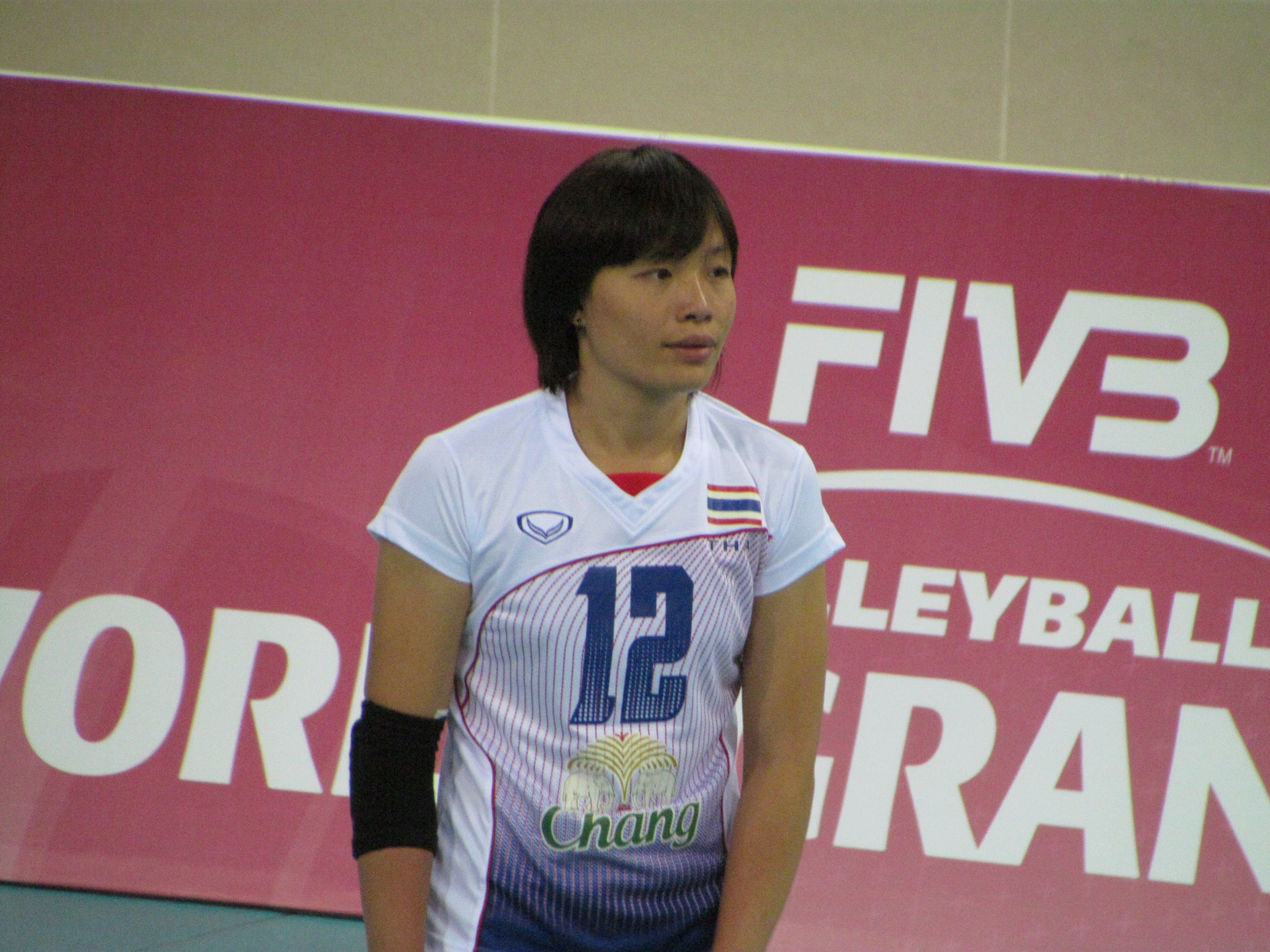

Personal information
- Nickname: Bami
- Born: November 29, 1989 (age 36); Khonkaen, Thailand
- Height: 1.68 m (5 ft 6 in)
- Weight: 60 kg (132 lb)
- Spike: 295 cm (116 in)
- Block: 276 cm (109 in)

Volleyball information
- Position: Outside hitter / libero
- Current club: Khonkaen Star
- Number: 23

National team
2008–2021 (14 years)	Thailand
Honours
Women's volleyball
Representing Thailand
Summer Universiade
Bronze medal – third place	2013 Kazan
Asian Games
Bronze medal – third place	2014 Incheon	Team
Asian Championship
Gold medal – first place	2009 Hanoi
Gold medal – first place	2013 Nakhon Ratchasima
Silver medal – second place	2017 Biñan
Bronze medal – third place	2015 Tianjin
Asian Cup
Gold medal – first place	2012 Almaty
Silver medal – second place	2010 Taicang
Bronze medal – third place	2008 Nakhon Ratchasima
Southeast Asian Games
Gold medal – first place	2011 Jakarta/Palembang
Gold medal – first place	2013 Naypyidaw

Tapaphaipun Chaisri (Thai: ฐาปไพพรรณ ไชยศรี; RTGS: Thapaphaiphan Chaisi, born November 29, 1989) is a member of the Thailand women's national volleyball team.

== Career ==
In the 2009 Asian University Games, she won the Most Valuable Player award. She became the 2012–13 Thailand League Most Valuable Player and 2014 Indonesia Proliga Best Spiker.

Chaisri played with the Thai club Khonkaen Star in 2017 on loan.

== Clubs ==
- (Thailand) Idea Khonkaen (2006–2013)
- (Vietnam) PV Oil Thái Bình (2009)
- (Indonesia) Jakarta Pertamina (2013–2014)
- (Thailand) Sisaket (2013–2014)
- (Thailand) Thai-Denmark (2015–2017)
- (Thailand) Khonkaen Star (2017–2021)
- (Thailand) Sisaket (2023–)

== Awards ==
=== Individual ===
- 2006 Thailand League "Best libero
- 2009 Asian University Games – "Most valuable player"
- 2012–13 Thailand League "Most valuable player"
- 2013 Summer Universiade "Best receiver"
- 2014 Indonesia League "Best server"
- 2014 Indonesia League "Best spiker"
- 2018–19 Thailand League "Best libero"

=== Clubs ===
- 2009 Asian Club Championship – Champion, with Federbrau
- 2010 Asian Club Championship – Champion, with Federbrau
- 2011 Asian Club Championship – Champion, with Chang
- 2012–13 Thailand League – Champion, with Idea Khonkaen
- 2013 Thai–Denmark Super League – Champion, with Idea Khonkaen
- 2013–14 Indonesia League – Champion, with Jakarta Pertamina
- 2019 Thai–Denmark Super League – Third, with Khonkaen Star
- 2020 Thailand League – Runner-up, with Khonkaen Star

== Royal decorations ==
- 2013 – Commander (Third Class) of The Most Exalted Order of the White Elephant
