= Nootsara Tomkom =

Thai volleyball player (born 1985)

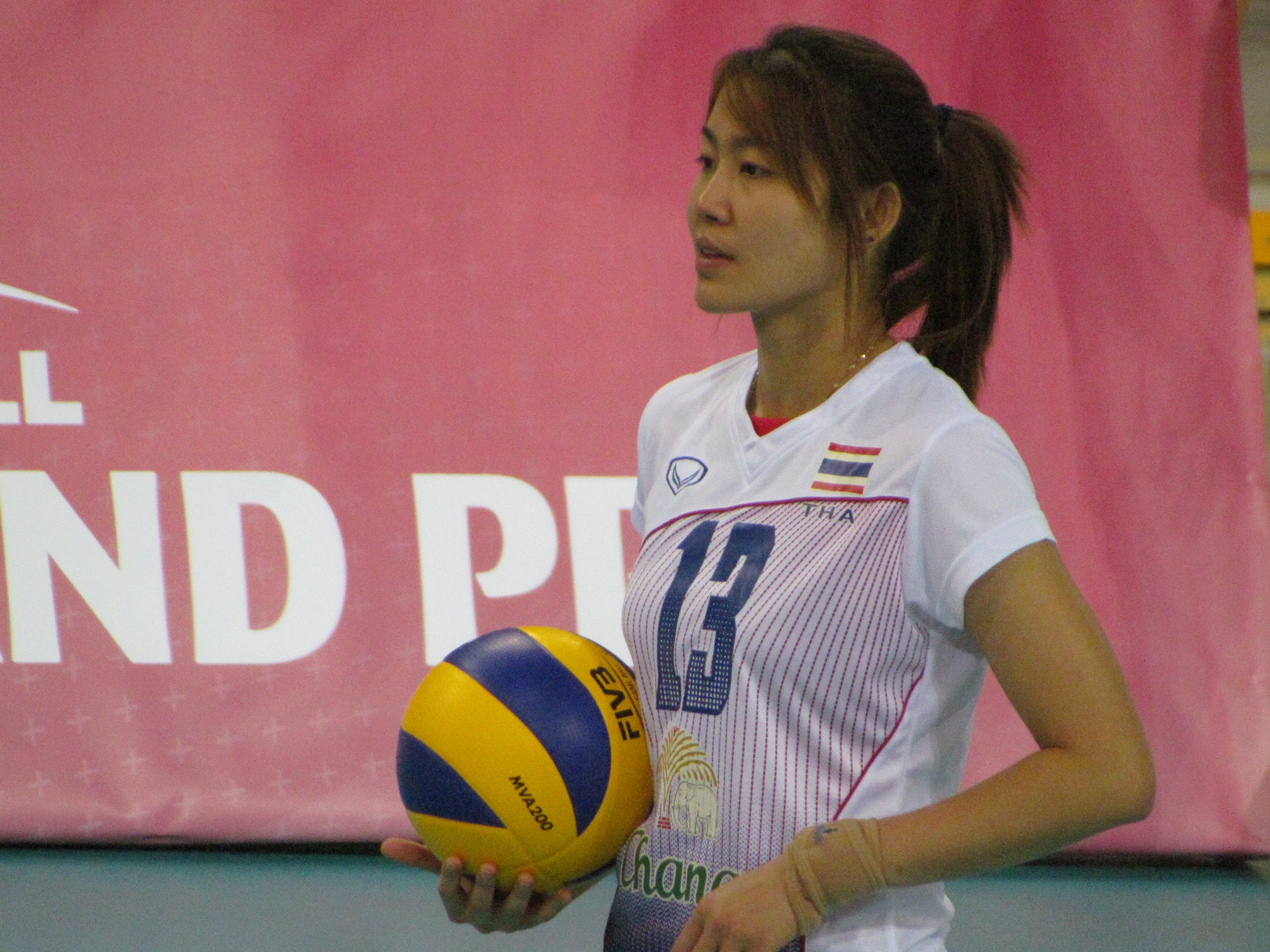

Personal information
- Full name: Nootsara Tomkom
- Born: July 7, 1985 (age 41) Ban Pong, Ratchaburi, Thailand
- Height: 170 cm (5 ft 7 in)
- Weight: 54.7 kg (121 lb)
- Spike: 290 cm (114 in)
- Block: 280 cm (110 in)

Volleyball information
- Position: Setter
- Current club: (Japan) Queenseis Kariya
- Number: 13

National team
- Years: Team
- 2003–2021, 2023: Thailand
Honours
Women's volleyball
Representing Thailand
Summer Universiade
| Bronze medal – third place | 2013 Kazan | Team |
Montreux Volley Masters
| Silver medal – second place | 2016 Switzerland |
Asian Games
| Silver medal – second place | 2018 Jakarta/Palembang | Team |
| Bronze medal – third place | 2014 Incheon | Team |
Asian Championship
| Gold medal – first place | 2009 Hanoi |
| Gold medal – first place | 2013 Nakhon Ratchasima |
| Silver medal – second place | 2017 Biñan |
| Silver medal – second place | 2019 Seoul |
| Bronze medal – third place | 2001 Nakhon Ratchasima |
| Bronze medal – third place | 2007 Nakhon Ratchasima |
| Bronze medal – third place | 2015 Tianjin |
Asian Cup
| Gold medal – first place | 2012 Almaty |
| Silver medal – second place | 2010 Taicang |
| Bronze medal – third place | 2008 Nakhon Ratchasima |
| Bronze medal – third place | 2018 Nakhon Ratchasima |
Southeast Asian Games
| Gold medal – first place | 2001 Kuala Lumpur | Team |
| Gold medal – first place | 2003 Hanoi | Team |
| Gold medal – first place | 2005 Manila | Team |
| Gold medal – first place | 2007 Nakhon Ratchasima | Team |
| Gold medal – first place | 2009 Vientiane | Team |
| Gold medal – first place | 2011 Palembang/Jakarta | Team |
| Gold medal – first place | 2013 Naypyidaw | Team |
| Gold medal – first place | 2015 Singapore | Team |
| Gold medal – first place | 2017 Kuala Lumpur | Team |
| Gold medal – first place | 2019 Philippines | Team |

Nootsara Tomkom (Thai: นุศรา ต้อมคำ; RTGS: Nutsara Tomkham) is a Thai volleyball player who coaches and plays for the Queensis Kariya of the Japan SV League. Widely regarded as one of the best setters in international volleyball, Tomkom has been selected to play for the Thailand women's national volleyball team over 50 times.

== Career ==
She participated at the 2006 FIVB World Grand Prix.

Tomkom played along Wilavan Apinyapong with the Spanish club IBSA Club Voleibol for the 2007/2008 season of the Spanish Superliga.

Tomkom won the Bronze medal with the Azeri club Rabita Baku in the 2013–14 CEV Champions League after falling 0-3 to the Russian Dinamo Kazan, but defeating 3-0 to the Turkish Eczacıbaşı VitrA Istanbul in the third place placement match. She was awarded tournament's Best Setter.

Rabita Baku, claimed their sixth title championship by winning the 2013–14 Azerbaijani Super League 3-0 to Azeryol Baku and she won the Best Setter award. She also ranked fourth in the 2013-14 Thailand League with Idea Khonkaen.

Tomkom helped Azerrail Baku to win the 2015–16 Azerbaijan Super League championship and she was awarded Best Setter.

In 2018 she played with the local Supreme Chonburi on loan.

She is on the list 2019 Korea-Thailand all star super match competition.

From 2022-24, she competed with Athletes Unlimited Pro Volleyball.

== Clubs ==
- (Spain) IBSA Club Voleibol (2007–2008)
- (Switzerland) Kanti Schaffhausen (2008–2010)
- (Azerbaijan) Azerrail Baku (2010–2012)
- (Azerbaijan) Igtisadchi Baku (2012–2013)
- (Azerbaijan) Rabita Baku (2013–2015)
- (Azerbaijan) Azerrail Baku (2015–2016)
- (Turkey) Fenerbahçe (2016–2018)
- (Thailand) Generali Supreme Chonburi (2018) (loan)
- (Thailand) Nakhon Ratchasima (2018–2020)
- (Thailand) Diamond Food (2020–2023)
- (United States) Athletes Unlimited Volleyball (2021–present)
- (United States) San Diego Mojo (2023–2024)
- (United States) Columbus Fury (2025)
- (Japan) Queensis Kariya (2025–present)

== Awards ==
=== Individual ===
- 2007 Asian Club Championship – "Best Setter"
- 2007 Asian Championship – "Best Setter"
- 2008 Asian Club Championship – "Best Setter"
- 2009 Asian Club Championship – "Best Server"
- 2009 Asian Championship – "Best Setter"
- 2010 Asian Club Championship – "Most Valuable Player"
- 2011 Asian Club Championship – "Best Server"
- 2012 Asian Club Championship – "Best Server"
- 2012 World Olympic Qualification – "Best Setter"
- 2012 FIVB World Grand Prix – "Best Setter"
- 2012 Asian Cup – "Best Setter"
- 2013 Asian Championship – "Best Setter"
- 2013–14 CEV Champions League – "Best Setter"
- 2014–15 Azerbaijan Super League – "Best Setter"
- 2015–16 Azerbaijan Super League – "Best Setter"
- 2016 Montreux Volley Masters – "Best Setter"
- 2016 FIVB World Grand Prix – "Best Setter"
- 2017 Asian Championship – "Best Setter"
- 2019 Asian Championship – "Best Setter"
- 2021 Asian Club Championship – "Best Setter"
- 2023 Asian Club Championship – "Best Setter"
- 2023–2024 Athletes Unlimited Pro Volleyball All-Position Team – "Best Setter"
- 2024 Pro Volleyball Federation – "2024 Setter of the Year"

=== Clubs ===
- 2010–11 Thailand League – Champion, with Kathu Phuket
- 2010–11 Azerbaijan Super League – Runner-up, with Azerrail Baku
- 2011–12 Azerbaijan Super League – Runner-up, with Azerrail Baku
- 2012–13 Azerbaijan Super League – Runner-up, with Igtisadchi Baku
- 2013 Thai–Denmark Super League – Champion, with Idea Khonkaen
- 2013-14 Azerbaijan Super League – Champion, with Rabita Baku
- 2014–15 Azerbaijan Super League – Champion, with Rabita Baku
- 2015–16 Azerbaijan Super League - Champion, with Azerrail Baku
- 2016-17 Turkish Cup - Champion, with Fenerbahçe
- 2016–17 Turkish League – Champion, with Fenerbahçe
- 2018–19 Thailand League – Champion, with Nakhon Ratchasima
- 2007 Asian Club Championship – Runner-up, with Sang Som
- 2008 Asian Club Championship – Runner-up, with Sang Som
- 2009 Asian Club Championship – Champion, with Federbrau
- 2010 Asian Club Championship – Champion, with Federbrau
- 2011 Asian Club Championship – Champion, with Chang
- 2012 Asian Club Championship – Bronze medal, with Chang
- 2010–11 Challenge Cup – Champion, with Azerrail Baku
- 2013–14 CEV Champions League – Bronze medal, with Rabita Baku
- 2018 Asian Club Championship - Champion, with Supreme Chonburi
- 2021 Asian Club Championship – Runner-up, with Nakhon Ratchasima QminC
- 2023 Asian Club Championship – Runner-up, with Diamond Food–Fine Chef

== Royal decorations ==
- 2013 – Commander (Third Class) of The Most Exalted Order of the White Elephant
- 2010 – Companion (Fourth Class) of The Most Admirable Order of the Direkgunabhorn

Awards
| Preceded by (Brazil) Dani Lins (United States) Molly Kreklow | Best Setter of FIVB World Grand Prix; 2012; 2016 | Succeeded by (United States) Alisha Glass (China) Ding Xia |
| Preceded by (Turkey) Naz Aydemir | Best Setter of CEV Women's Champions League; 2013-14 | Succeeded by (Turkey) Naz Aydemir |
