= Rattanaporn Sanuanram =

Thai volleyball player

Personal information
- Nickname: Pui
- Nationality: Thailand
- Born: April 9, 1980 (age 46); Bangkok, Thailand
- Height: 1.80 m (5 ft 11 in)
- Weight: 66 kg (146 lb)

Volleyball information
- Position: Middle Blocker
- Current club: Supreme Chonburi
- Number: 22

National team
1998, 2004–2008	Thailand
Honours
Women's volleyball
Representing Thailand
Southeast Asian Games
Gold medal – first place	2005 Manila	Team
Gold medal – first place	2007 Nakhon Ratchasima	Team
Asian Championship
Bronze medal – third place	2007 Nakhon Ratchasima	Team

Rattanaporn Sanuanram (Thai: รัตนาภรณ์ สนวนรัมย์, born April 9, 1980) is a retired Thai indoor volleyball player of Supreme Chonburi. She is a current member of the Thailand women's national volleyball team.

== Career ==
Rattanaporn played the 2014/15 season with the Thai club Bangkok.

== Clubs ==
- (Thailand) Phuket (2006)
- (Thailand) Chiang Rai VC (2010)
- (Vietnam) Quang Ninh VC (2011-2012)
- (Thailand) Ayutthaya A.T.C.C (2013–2014)
- (Thailand) Bangkok (2014–2015)
- (Thailand) Supreme Chonburi (2015–2017)

== Awards ==
=== Individual ===
- 2006 Thailand League "Best Spiker
- 2010 Thailand League "Best Spiker"
- 2014–15 Thailand League "Best Middle Blocker"

=== Clubs ===
- 2006 Thailand League - Runner-Up, with Phuket
- 2013 Thai-Denmark Super League - Bronze medal, with Ayutthaya A.T.C.C
- 2013–14 Thailand League - 3rd place, with Ayutthaya A.T.C.C
- 2016–17 Thailand League - Champion, with Supreme Chonburi
- 2017 Thai-Denmark Super League - Champion, with Supreme Chonburi
- 2017 Asian Club Championship - Champion, with Supreme Chonburi
