= Chitaporn Kamlangmak =

Thai volleyball player

Personal information
- Nickname: Yui
- Nationality: Thai
- Born: March 17, 1996 (age 30); Chaiyaphum, Thailand
- Height: 1.84 m (6 ft 0 in)
- Weight: 74 kg (163 lb)
- Spike: 311 cm (122 in)
- Block: 299 cm (118 in)

Volleyball information
- Position: Middle Blocker
- Current club: (Thailand) Khonkaen Star
- Number: 4

National team
2018–2021	Thailand
Honours
Women's volleyball
Representing Thailand
Asian Games
Silver medal – second place	2018 Jakarta/Palembang	Team
U23 Asian Championship
Silver medal – second place	2017 Nakhon Ratchasima	Team

Chitaporn Kamlangmak (Thai: ชิตพร กำลังมาก; born March 17, 1996, in Chaiyaphum) is a Thai indoor volleyball player. She is a current member of the Thailand women's national volleyball team.

== Career ==
She is on the list 2019 Korea-Thailand all star super match competition.

== Clubs ==
- (Thailand) Idea Khonkaen (2013–2014)
- (Thailand) Sisaket (2014–2015)
- (Thailand) Thai-Denmark Nong Rua (2015–2016)
- (Thailand) Khonkaen Star (2016–2020)
- (Thailand) Nakhon Ratchasima (2020–2023)
- (Japan) Hisamitsu Springs (2023–2024)
- (Thailand) Nakhon Ratchasima (2024–2025)
- (Thailand) Khonkaen Star (2025–present)

== Awards ==
=== Individuals ===
- 2015 CH7 University Championship – "Best Blocker"
- 2016 CH7 University Championship – "Best Middle Blocker"
- 2020–21 Thailand League – "Best Middle Blocker"
- 2021–22 Thailand League – "Best Middle Blocker"
- 2022–23 Thailand League – "Best Middle Blocker"

=== Clubs ===
- 2019 Thai-Denmark Super League – Third place, with Khonkaen Star
- 2019–20 Thailand League – Runner-up, with Khonkaen Star
- 2020–21 Thailand League – Runner-up, with Nakhon Ratchasima
- 2021–22 Thailand League – Third place, with Nakhon Ratchasima
- 2022–23 Thailand League – Champion, with Nakhon Ratchasima
- 2024–25 Thailand League – Third place, with Nakhon Ratchasima
