= Chatchu-on Moksri =

Thai volleyball player

Personal information
- Nickname: Bumbim
- Nationality: Thai
- Born: 6 November 1999 (age 27) Buriram, Thailand
- Height: 1.80 m (5 ft 11 in)
- Weight: 58 kg (128 lb)
- Spike: 302 cm (119 in)
- Block: 298 cm (117 in)

Volleyball information
- Position: Outside spiker
- Current club: (Japan) Victorina Himeji
- Number: 19

National team
- Years: Team
- 2014–present: Thailand
Honours
Women's volleyball
Representing Thailand
Montreux Volley Masters
Silver medal – second place	2016 Switzerland	Team
Asian Games
Silver medal – second place	2018 Jakarta-Palembang	Team
Bronze medal – third place	2022 Hangzhou	Team
Bronze medal – third place	2026 Aichi-Nagoya	Team
Asian Championship
Gold medal – first place	2023 Nakhon Ratchasima	Team
Gold medal – first place	2026 Tianjin	Team
Silver medal – second place	2017 Biñan	Team
Silver medal – second place	2019 Seoul	Team
Asian Cup
Bronze medal – third place	2016 Vĩnh Phúc	Team
Bronze medal – third place	2022 Pasig	Team
U-23 Asian Championship
Silver medal – second place	2015 Philippines	Team
Silver medal – second place	2017 Nakhon Ratchasima	Team
U-20 Asian Championship
Bronze medal – third place	2016 Nakhon Ratchasima	Team
U-18 Asian Championship
Silver medal – second place	2014 Nakhon Ratchasima	Team
Southeast Asian Games
Gold medal – first place	2015 Singapore	Team
Gold medal – first place	2017 Kuala Lumpur	Team
Gold medal – first place	2019 Philippines	Team
Gold medal – first place	2021 Vietnam	Team
Gold medal – first place	2023 Cambodia	Team
Gold medal – first place	2025 Thailand	Team

Chatchu-on Moksri (Thai: ชัชชุอร โมกศรี, RTGS: Chatchu-on Moksi; born November 6, 1999, in Buriram) is a Thai indoor volleyball player. She is a current member of the Thailand women's national volleyball team.

== Career ==
Chatchu-on moved to the Thai club Supreme Chonburi for the 2017 season, playing on loan. She played the 2014 Asian Cup finishing in fifth place and the 2014 World Championship ranking in the 17th place. She also played the 2016 World Grand Prix ending up in the ninth place.

In 2018 she played with the local Supreme Chonburi on loan.

She played in 2019 Asian Women's Club Volleyball Championship with Supreme Chonburi on loan.

== Clubs ==
- (Thailand) Ayutthaya (2013–2015)
- (Thailand) Nonthaburi (2015–2016)
- (Thailand) Generali Supreme Chonburi-E.Tech (2017) (loan)
- (Thailand) Nakhon Ratchasima (2016–2018)
- (Japan) PFU BlueCats (2018–2019)
- (Thailand) Generali Supreme Chonburi-E.Tech (2018–2019) (loan)
- (Thailand) PEA Sisaket (2018–2019) (loan)
- (Thailand) Nakhon Ratchasima (2019–2021)
- (Turkey) Sarıyer Belediyespor (2021–2023)
- (Japan) Victorina Himeji (2023–2026)
- (Japan) Saitama Ageo Medics (2026–present)

== Awards ==
=== Individuals ===
- 2014 Asian U17 Championship – "Best outside spiker"
- 2015 VTV Cup Championship – "Best outside spiker"
- 2016 Southeast Asian U19 Championship – "Best outside spiker"
- 2016 Southeast Asian U19 Championship – "Most valuable player"
- 2017 Asian U23 Championship – "Best outside spiker"
- 2017 Asian Club Championship – "Best outside spiker"
- 2017 Asian Championship – "Best outside spiker"
- 2017–18 Thailand League – "Best outside spiker"
- 2018 Yeltsin Cup – "Best server"
- 2019 ASEAN Grand Prix – "Best outside spiker"
- 2019–20 Thailand League – "Best scorer"
- 2019–20 Thailand League – "Best outside spiker"
- 2020–21 Thailand League – "Best scorer"
- 2020–21 Thailand League – "Best outside spiker"
- 2021 Asian Women's Club Volleyball Championship – "Best outside spiker"
- 2022 AVC Cup – "Best outside spiker"
- 2023 Asian Championship – "Most Valuable Player"

=== Clubs ===
- 2014–15 Thailand League – Runner-up, with Ayutthaya A.T.C.C
- 2017–18 Thailand League – Runner-up, with Nakhon Ratchasima
- 2014 Thai-Denmark Super League – Champion, with Ayutthaya A.T.C.C
- 2017 Asian Club Championship – Champion, with Supreme Chonburi
- 2018 Asian Club Championship – Champion, with Supreme Chonburi
- 2019 Asian Club Championship – Runner-up, with Supreme Chonburi

== Royal decoration ==
- 2023 – Companion (Fourth Class) of The Most Admirable Order of the Direkgunabhorn

Awards
Preceded by (Japan) Mayu Ishikawa	Most Valuable Player of Asian Championship; 2023	Succeeded by Incumbent
Preceded by (China) Zhu Ting and (South Korea) Kim Yeon-koung	Best Outside Spiker of Asian Championship; 2017 (with (South Korea) Kim Yeon-koung)	Succeeded by (Japan) Mayu Ishikawa and (South Korea) Kim Yeon-koung
