= Saymai Paladsrichuay =

Thai volleyball player (born 1987)

Personal information
- Nickname: Aom
- Nationality: Thailand
- Born: August 4, 1987 (age 39); Khon Kaen, Thailand
- Height: 1.80 m (5 ft 11 in)
- Weight: 74 kg (163 lb)

Volleyball information
- Position: Wing-spiker

National team
2003–2008	Thailand
Honours
Women's volleyball
Representing Thailand
Southeast Asian Games
Gold medal – first place	2005 Manila	Team
Gold medal – first place	2007 Nakhon Ratchasima	Team
Asian Championship
Bronze medal – third place	2007 Nakhon Ratchasima	Team
Asian Cup Championship
Bronze medal – third place	2008 Nakhon Ratchasima	Team

Saymai Paladsrichuay (Thai: สายไหม ปลัดศรีช่วย, RTGS: Saimai Palatsichuai; born August 4, 1987) is a retired Thai indoor volleyball player. She is a member of the Thailand women's national volleyball team.

== Clubs ==
=== As a volleyball player ===
- (Thailand) Khon Kaen (2005–2008)
- (Turkey) Yesilyurt (2008–2009)
- (Thailand) Idea Khonkaen (2010–2013)
- (Thailand) Cosmo Chiang Rai (2015–2016)

=== As a coach assistant ===
- (Thailand) Khonkaen Star (2016–present)

== Awards ==
=== Individuals ===
- 2006 Thailand League "Best Scorer"
- 2006 Thailand League "Best Server"
- 2003 Asian Youth Championship - "Best Scorer"

=== Club ===
- 2006 Thailand League - Third place, with Khon Kaen
- 2007–08 Thailand League - Champion, with Khon Kaen
- 2012–13 Thailand League - Champion, with Idea Khonkaen
