= Hattaya Bamrungsuk =

Thai indoor volleyball player (born 1993)

Personal information
- Nickname: Tei
- Nationality: Thai
- Born: August 12, 1993 (age 33); Chaiyaphum, Thailand
- Height: 1.80 m (5 ft 11 in)
- Weight: 72 kg (159 lb)
- Spike: 292 cm (115 in)
- Block: 282 cm (111 in)

Volleyball information
- Position: Middle Blocker
- Current club: (Japan) Saga Hisamitsu Springs
- Number: 12 (National team), 22 (Club)

National team
2010, 2014–2025	Thailand
Honours
Women's volleyball
Representing Thailand
Montreux Volley Masters
Silver medal – second place	2016 Switzerland
Asian Games
Silver medal – second place	2018 Jakarta-Palembang	Team
Bronze medal – third place	2022 Hangzhou	Team
Asian Championship
Gold medal – first place	2023 Nakhon Ratchasima
Silver medal – second place	2017 Biñan
Bronze medal – third place	2015 Tianjin
Asian Cup
Bronze medal – third place	2016 Vĩnh Phúc
Bronze medal – third place	2018 Nakhon Ratchasima
Bronze medal – third place	2022 Pasig
Southeast Asian Games
Gold medal – first place	2015 Singapore	Team
Gold medal – first place	2017 Kuala Lumpur	Team
Gold medal – first place	2021 Vietnam	Team
Gold medal – first place	2023 Cambodia	Team
Gold medal – first place	2025 Thailand	Team

Hattaya Bamrungsuk (Thai: หัตถยา บำรุงสุข; born 12 August 1993) is a Thai indoor volleyball player. She is a current member of the Thailand women's national volleyball team.

== Career ==
She participated at the 2010 World Grand Prix, 2014 World Championship, 2017 World Grand Prix, and 2018 Nations League.

== Club ==
- (Thailand) Nakhon Ratchasima (2010–2018)
- (Thailand) Diamond Food (2020–2021)
- (Japan) Toyota Auto Body Queenseis (2021–)

== Awards ==
=== Individuals ===
- 2010–11 Thailand League – "Best Blocker"
- 2012–13 Thailand League – "Best Blocker"
- 2013–14 Thailand League – "Most Valuable Player"
- 2015 U23 Asian Championship – "Best Middle Blocker"
- 2016 Montreux Volley Masters – "Best Middle Blocker"
- 2017 Asian Championship – "Best Middle Blocker"

=== Club ===
- 2013–14 Thailand League – Champion, with Nakhon Ratchasima
- 2017–18 Thailand League – Runner-up, with Nakhon Ratchasima

== National team ==
=== Senior team ===
- 2016 Montreux Masters - Silver Medal

== Royal decoration ==
- 2023 – Member (Fifth Class) of The Most Admirable Order of the Direkgunabhorn
