= Wilavan Apinyapong =

Thai volleyball player (born 1984)

Wilavan Apinyapong วิลาวัณย์ อภิญญาพงศ์
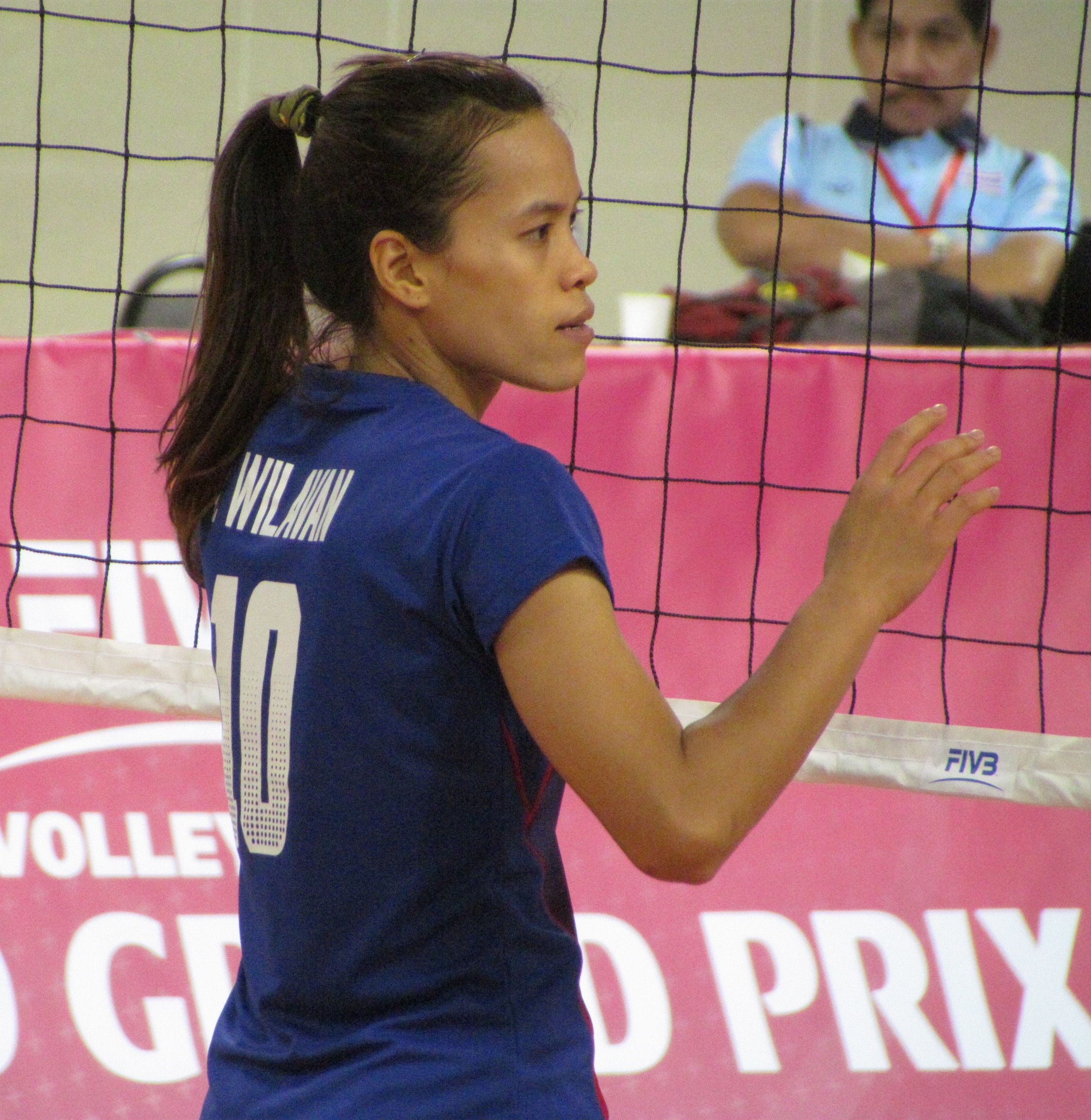

Personal information
- Nickname: Give
- Born: June 6, 1984 (age 42) Nakhon Ratchasima, Thailand
- Height: 1.74 m (5 ft 9 in)
- Weight: 68 kg (150 lb)
- Spike: 294 cm (116 in)
- Block: 282 cm (111 in)

Volleyball information
- Position: Outside hitter
- Current club: Supreme Chonburi
- Number: 10

National team
- Years: Team
- 2003–2021 (18 years): Thailand
Honours
Women's volleyball
Representing Thailand
Asian Games
Silver medal – second place	2018 Jakarta/Palembang	Team
Bronze medal – third place	2014 Incheon	Team
Asian Championship
Gold medal – first place	2009 Hanoi
Gold medal – first place	2013 Nakhon Ratchasima
Silver medal – second place	2017 Biñan
Silver medal – second place	2019 Seoul
Bronze medal – third place	2001 Nakhon Ratchasima
Bronze medal – third place	2007 Nakhon Ratchasima
Bronze medal – third place	2015 Tianjin
Asian Cup
Gold medal – first place	2012 Almaty
Silver medal – second place	2010 Taicang
Bronze medal – third place	2008 Nakhon Ratchasima
Bronze medal – third place	2016 Vĩnh Phúc
Bronze medal – third place	2018 Nakhon Ratchasima
Southeast Asian Games
Gold medal – first place	2001 Kuala Lumpur	Team
Gold medal – first place	2003 Hanoi	Team
Gold medal – first place	2005 Manila	Team
Gold medal – first place	2007 Nakhon Ratchasima	Team
Gold medal – first place	2009 Vientiane	Team
Gold medal – first place	2011 Palembang/Jakarta	Team
Gold medal – first place	2013 Naypyidaw	Team
Gold medal – first place	2015 Singapore	Team
Gold medal – first place	2017 Kuala Lumpur	Team
Gold medal – first place	2019 Philippines	Team

Wilavan Apinyapong (Thai: วิลาวัณย์ อภิญญาพงศ์; RTGS: Wilawan Aphinyaphong, born June 6, 1984) is a Thai professional volleyball player who plays for Azerbaijan Club Igtisadchi Baku in the Azerbaijan Super League and the Thai National Team as an Outside Hitter. She was the captain for the Thailand women's national volleyball team from 2008 to 2016 when Pleumjit took the captain role.

Apinyapong led the Thai team to win the first gold medal at 2009 Asian Women's Volleyball Championship and beaten China 3-1 for the first time in history. She again led the team to victory in the 2013 Asian Women's Volleyball Championship where she also received the MVP award of the event.

== Career ==
Apinyapong signed with the Spanish professional club IBSA Club Voleibol for the 2007–2008 season of the Spanish Superliga, playing with her countrymate Nootsara Tomkom. For the next two seasons, she and some of her Thai teammates, such as Malika Kanthong, Amporn Hyapha signed with the Turkish club Ereğli Belediye and had a successful club career there.

In 2010, she signed with the Chinese club Guangzhou Evergrande under coach Jenny Lang Ping. Along with the Olympics MVP Feng Kun, Yang Hao, Logan Tom, Jovana Brakočević. She was benched most of the time during the season because of the limitation on foreigner players were only two foreign players were allowed on the court.

Next season, she moved to another Chinese club team Fujian Xi Meng Bao and played alongside good friend Pleumjit Thinkaow and Chinese Olympics bronze medalist Xu Yunli.

The Thai team went on to finish in fourth place at the 2012 World Grand Prix, making it the best result for Thailand since 2002 as the Thai team participated for the first time. After winning the gold medal against China at the 2012 Asian Women's Cup Volleyball Championship, Apinyapong and her 6 other teammates signed for Igtisadchi Baku and helped the team to win the silver medal at the 2012–13 Azerbaijan Women's Volleyball Super League. They also qualified for the 2013/2014 CEV Women's Champions League for the very first time since the club was founded.

In 2013 she received the MVP award at the 2013 Asian Women's Volleyball Championship . She extended the contract with Igtisadchi Baku for one more year and was subsequently appointed captain. In late 2013, after winning the gold medal at 2013 Southeast Asian Games, Apinyapong said that she will not go to compete at the 2014 FIVB Women's World Championship because she is set to join the 2014 Asian Games in Incheon, South Korea, considering that she might have a chance to win at least one medal.

In 2015 she played with the local Bangkok Glass on loan. She also played on loan with Bangkok Glass in 2016. She moved to the Vietnamese VTV Bình Điền Long An in 2017, playing on loan.

She is on the list 2019 Korea-Thailand all star super match competition.

After not qualifying to the 2020 Summer Olympics, Wilavan decided to retire after representing Thailand for 20 years, along with Nootsara.

== Personal life ==
Apinyapong married Nattapong Kesapan, at Kham Sakaesaeng, Nakhon Ratchasima on 7 May 2017. Apinyapong graduated from Bangkok University with a bachelor and a master's degree.

== Clubs ==
- (Vietnam) Vĩnh Long (2006–2007)
- (Thailand) Sang Som (2007–2008)
- (Spain) IBSA Club Voleibol (2007–2008)
- (Turkey) Ereğli Belediye (2008–2010)
- (Thailand) Federbrau (2010–2011)
- (China) Guangzhou Evergrande (2010–2011)
- (Thailand) Chang (2011–2012)
- (China) Fujian Xi Meng Bao (2011–2012)
- (Azerbaijan) Igtisadchi Baku (2012–2014)
- (Thailand) Nakhon Ratchasima (2013–2015)
- (Thailand) Bangkok Glass (2015, loan)
- (Thailand) Supreme Chonburi (2015–2021)
- (Thailand) Bangkok Glass (2016, loan)
- (Vietnam) VTV Bình Điền Long An (2017, loan)

== Awards ==
=== Individuals ===
- 2011 Asian Club Championship – "Most valuable player"
- 2013 Asian Championship – "Most valuable player"
- 2014–15 Thailand League – "Best scorer"
- 2014–15 Thailand League – "Best outside spiker"
- 2016 Asian Club Championship – "Best outside spiker"
- 2016 VTV Cup Championship – "Best outside spiker"
- 2016–17 Thailand League – "Best outside spiker"
- 2018–19 Thailand League – "Best outside spiker"

=== Clubs ===
- 2006 Thailand League – Champion, with Nakhon Ratchasima
- 2010–11 Chinese League – Runner-up, with Guangzhou Evergrande
- 2012–13 Azerbaijan Super League – Runner-up, with Igtisadchi Baku
- 2013–14 Thailand League – Champion, with Nakhon Ratchasima
- 2015–16 Thailand League – Runner-up, with Supreme Chonburi
- 2016–17 Thailand League – Champion, with Supreme Chonburi
- 2017–18 Thailand League – Champion, with Supreme Chonburi
- 2018–19 Thailand League – Runner-up, with Supreme Chonburi
- 2017 Thai–Denmark Super League – Champion, with Supreme Chonburi
- 2018 Thai–Denmark Super League – Champion, with Supreme Chonburi
- 2019 Thai–Denmark Super League – Champion, with Supreme Chonburi
- 2009 Asian Club Championship – Champion, with Federbrau
- 2010 Asian Club Championship – Champion, with Federbrau
- 2011 Asian Club Championship – Champion, with Chang
- 2012 Asian Club Championship – Bronze medal, with Chang
- 2015 Asian Club Championship – Champion, with Bangkok Glass
- 2016 Asian Club Championship – Bronze medal, with Bangkok Glass
- 2017 Asian Club Championship – Champion, with Supreme Chonburi
- 2018 Asian Club Championship – Champion, with Supreme Chonburi
- 2019 Asian Club Championship – Runner-up, with Supreme Chonburi

== Royal decorations ==
- 2013 – Commander (Third Class) of The Most Exalted Order of the White Elephant
- 2010 – Companion (Fourth Class) of The Most Admirable Order of the Direkgunabhorn

Awards
Preceded by (China) Wang Yimei	Most Valuable Player of Asian Championship; 2013	Succeeded by (China) Zhu Ting
