= Ayutthaya Women's Volleyball Club =

Thai volleyball club

Ayutthaya A.T.C.C
- Full name: Ayutthaya A.T.C.C
- Short name: Ayutthaya
- Founded: 2010
- Dissolved: 2015
- Ground: Ayutthaya Provincial Gymnasium; Phranakhon Si Ayutthaya, Thailand (Capacity: 4,000)
- Chairman: (Thailand) Somjit Sirisena
- Head coach: (Thailand) Jarun Niemtubtim
- League: Thailand League
- 2014–2015: 2nd place

Uniforms
| Home | Away |

Ayutthaya A.T.C.C (Thai: สโมสรวอลเลย์บอลอยุธยา เอ.ที.ซี.ซี) was a female professional volleyball team based in Phranakhon Si Ayutthaya, Thailand.

== History ==
Ayutthaya A.T.C.C was a women's volleyball club, based in Phranakhon Si Ayutthaya, Thailand. It included volleyball teams for females of all ages, children through adult. The club played in Volleyball Thailand League.

In 2014, Ayutthaya A.T.C.C won the 2014 Volleyball Thai-Denmark Super League, defeating 3-0 the Idea Khonkaen in the semifinals and 3-0 to the Nakhon Ratchasima in the final.

== Previous names ==
| 2005–2009 | Phra Nakhon Si Ayutthaya |
| 2009–2010 | Krungkao Mektec |
| 2010–2015 | Ayutthaya A.T.C.C |

== Honours ==
- Thailand League
  - Champion (1): 2009–10
  - Runner-up (3): 2008–09, 2010–11, 2014–15
  - Third (1): 2013–14
- Thai-Denmark Super League
  - Champion (1): 2014
  - Third (2): 2013, 2015

== Former squad ==
2014–2015 Team
| Number | Player | Position | Height (m) | Weight (kg) | Birth date |
|---|---|---|---|---|---|
| 1 | (Thailand) Yupa Sanitklang | Libero | 1.66 | 59 | 14 August 1991 |
| 3 | (Thailand) Kannika Thipachot | Outside Hitter | 1.70 | 70 | 3 May 1993 |
| 4 | (Thailand) Siriporn Sooksen | Middle Blocker | 1.81 | 68 | 9 February 1987 |
| 6 | (Thailand) Kannika Sitthipat | Libero | 1.66 | 58 | 3 August 1994 |
| 7 | (United States) Nia Grant | Middle Blocker | 1.92 | 71 | 8 May 1993 |
| 9 | (Thailand) Ni-on Phanrangsri | Opposite | 1.73 | 61 | 30 June 1993 |
| 10 | (Thailand) Thidarat Pengwichai | Opposite | 1.78 | 75 | 28 August 1992 |
| 11 | (Thailand) Soraya Phomla (C) | Setter | 1.69 | 60 | 6 August 1992 |
| 12 | (Thailand) Anongporn Promrat | Middle Blocker | 1.80 | 70 | 2 March 1992 |
| 13 | (Thailand) Kannika Krayom | Outside Hitter | 1.69 | 59 | 24 January 1993 |
| 15 | (Thailand) Yaowalak Mahaon | Outside Hitter | 1.74 | 71 | 20 June 1989 |
| 16 | (Thailand) Chatchu-on Moksri | Outside Hitter | 1.78 | 63 | 6 November 1999 |
| 17 | (Azerbaijan) Yelena Parkhomenko | Middle Blocker | 1.86 | 68 | 11 September 1982 |
| 19 | (Thailand) Nisachon Pawong | Middle Blocker | 1.72 | 57 | 2 March 1992 |
| 20 | (Thailand) Surasawadee Boonyuen | Opposite | 1.79 | 68 | 31 October 1991 |

2013–2014 Team
| Number | Player | Position | Height (m) | Weight (kg) | Birth date |
|---|---|---|---|---|---|
| 1 | (Thailand) Yupa Sanitklang | Libero | 1.66 | 59 | 14 August 1991 |
| 3 | (Thailand) Kannika Thipachot | Outside Hitter | 1.70 | 70 | 3 May 1993 |
| 4 | (Thailand) Siriporn Sooksen | Middle Blocker | 1.81 | 68 | 9 February 1987 |
| 6 | (Thailand) Kannika Sitthipat | Libero | 1.66 | 58 | 3 August 1994 |
| 8 | (Thailand) Charoenporn Pimkaew | Outside Hitter | 1.67 | 55 | 14 February 1994 |
| 9 | (Thailand) Ni-on Phanrangsri | Opposite | 1.73 | 61 | 30 June 1993 |
| 11 | (Thailand) Soraya Phomla (C) | Setter | 1.69 | 60 | 6 August 1992 |
| 12 | (Thailand) Anongporn Promrat | Middle Blocker | 1.80 | 70 | 2 March 1992 |
| 13 | (Thailand) Kannika Krayom | Outside Hitter | 1.69 | 59 | 24 January 1993 |
| 15 | (Thailand) Yaowalak Mahaon | Outside Hitter | 1.74 | 71 | 20 June 1989 |
| 16 | (Thailand) Chatchu-on Moksri | Outside Hitter | 1.78 | 63 | 6 November 1999 |
| 18 | (Vietnam) Nguyen Thi Ngoc Hoa | Middle Blocker | 1.83 | 64 | 10 November 1987 |
| 19 | (Thailand) Rattanaporn Sanuanram | Middle Blocker | 1.80 | 66 | 9 April 1980 |
| 20 | (Thailand) Surasawadee Boonyuen | Opposite | 1.79 | 68 | 31 October 1991 |

== Notable players ==
Domestic Players

- (Thailand) Somruk Sungpokeaw
- (Thailand) Patcharee Sangmuang
- (Thailand) Rattanaporn Sanuanram
- (Thailand) Yupa Sanitklang
- (Thailand) Anongporn Promrat
- (Thailand) Siriporn Sooksen
- (Thailand) Nisachon Pawong
- (Thailand) Chatchu-on Moksri
- (Thailand) Kannika Sitthipat
- (Thailand) Soraya Phomla
- (Thailand) Kannika Thipachot
- (Thailand) Yaowalak Maha-an
- (Thailand) Surasawadee Boonyuen

Foreigner Players

- (Azerbaijan) Yelena Parkhomenko
- (United States) Nia Grant
- (Vietnam) Nguyen Thi Ngoc Hoa
