= Em-orn Phanusit =

Thai volleyball player

Personal information
- Nickname: Sunny
- Nationality: Thai
- Born: March 25, 1988 (age 38); Khonkaen, Thailand
- Height: 1.79 m (5 ft 10 in)
- Weight: 66 kg (146 lb)
- Spike: 302 cm (119 in)
- Block: 291 cm (115 in)

Volleyball information
- Position: Opposite hitter
- Current club: Khonkaen Star
- Number: 15

National team
2008–2011, 2014	Thailand
Honours
Women's volleyball
Representing Thailand
Asian Games
Bronze medal – third place	2014 Incheon	Team
Asian Championship
Gold medal – first place	2009 Hanoi
Asian Cup
Silver medal – second place	2010 Taicang
Bronze medal – third place	2008 Nakhon Ratchasima
Southeast Asian Games
Gold medal – first place	2009 Vientiane	Team
Summer Universiade
Bronze medal – third place	2013 Kazan	Team

Em-orn Phanusit (Thai: เอ็มอร พานุสิทธิ์, born March 25, 1988) is a Thai indoor volleyball player of Idea Khonkaen. She is a member of the Thailand women's national volleyball team.

== Clubs ==
- (Thailand) Khonkaen Star (2008–)

== Awards ==
=== Individuals ===
- 2012–13 Thailand League "Best spiker"
- 2014–15 Thailand League "Best opposite spiker"

=== Clubs ===
- 2012–13 Thailand League - Champion, with Idea Khonkaen
- 2013 Thai–Denmark Super League - Champion, with Idea Khonkaen
- 2019 Thai–Denmark Super League - Third, with Khonkaen Star
- 2020 Thailand League – Runner-up, with Khonkaen Star
