= Konwika Apinyapong =

Thai indoor volleyball player (born 1987)

Personal information
- Nickname: Aom
- Nationality: Thailand
- Born: 24 November 1987 (age 38)
- Height: 1.68 m (5 ft 6 in)
- Weight: 55 kg (121 lb)
- Spike: 303 cm (119 in)
- Block: 293 cm (115 in)

Volleyball information
- Position: Setter

Career
Years	Teams
2007	Nakhonratchasima

National team
2006-2008	Thailand
Honours
Women's volleyball
Representing Thailand

Konwika Apinyapong (born 24 November 1987) is a Thai indoor volleyball player. She is a member of the Thailand women's national volleyball team. She participated at the 2006 Asian Games, and 2007 FIVB Volleyball Women's World Cup.

== Clubs ==
- (Thailand) Nakhonratchasima (2005–2013)
