= Federbrau Volleyball =

Thai volleyball club

- Full name: Federbrau
- Founded: 2006
- Dissolved: 2012
- Chairman: (Thailand) Kongkiat Kaewsawee
- Head Coach: (Thailand) Kiattipong Radchatagriengkai
- League: Thailand Volleyball Championship Serie A

Federbrau was a women's volleyball club, based in Bangkok, Thailand. The club played in the Thailand Volleyball Championship Serie A, which started in 2006.

== History ==
The team won the 2009 Asian Club Championship, after defeating Tianjin Bridgestone at the final game. Onuma Sittirak won the MVP and Best Spiker award, Nootsara Tomkom Best Server and Wanna Buakaew Best Libero.

In the 2010 Asian Club Championship the team successfully retained the crown against Zhetysu Almaty from Kazakhstan. Nootsara Tomkom won the MVP award and Sittirak winning the Best Scorer and Best Spiker awards for Federbrau.

As the winner of the Asian Volleyball Confederation club tournament, the team earned the right to play at the 2010 FIVB Women's Club World Championship.

== Squads ==
As of 2012 Asian Club Championship

Number	Player	Position
1	(Thailand) Wanna Buakaew	Libero
2	(Thailand) Piyanut Pannoy	Libero
5	(Thailand) Pleumjit Thinkaow	Middle Blocker
6	(Thailand) Onuma Sittirak	Outside hitter
9	(Thailand) Piyamas Koijapo	Opposite hitter
10	(Thailand) Wilavan Apinyapong	Outside hitter
11	(Thailand) Amporn Hyapha	Middle Blocker
13	(Thailand) Nootsara Tomkom	Setter
15	(Thailand) Malika Kanthong	Universal
16	(Thailand) Pornpun Guedpard	Setter
18	(Thailand) Ajcharaporn Kongyot	Opposite hitter
19	(Thailand) Sontaya keawbundit	Outside hitter

=== Current ===
As of December 2010

- Head Coach: (Thailand) Kiattipong Radchatagriengkai
- Assistant coach: (Thailand) Nataphon Srisamutnak

== Competition history ==
=== AVC Club Championships ===
- 2006 - 3rd place
- 2007 - Runner-up
- 2008 - Runner-up
- 2009 - Champion
- 2010 - Champion
- 2011 - Champion
- 2012 - 3rd place

=== FIVB Volleyball Women's Club World Championship ===
- 2010 — 5th place
- 2011 — 5th place
