= 2013–14 Women's Volleyball Thailand League =

- League: Thailand League
- Sport: Volleyball
- Duration: December 22, 2013 – May 4, 2014
- Number of games: 56 (Regular Season)
- Number of teams: 8
- Season champions: Nakhon Ratchasima (3rd title)
- Season MVP: (Thailand) Hattaya Bamrungsuk

Women's Volleyball Thailand League seasons
- ← 2012–13 2014–15 →

The Women's Volleyball Thailand League is the highest level of Thailand club volleyball in the 2013–14 season and the 9th edition.

== Teams ==
- Ayutthaya A.T.C.C
- Idea Khonkaen
- Nakhonnont
- Nakhon Ratchasima
- Sisaket
- Suan Sunandha
- Supreme Chonburi
- Udonthani

== Regular season ==
=== Ranking ===
Pos	Team	Pld	W	L	Pts	SW	SL	SR	SPW	SPL	SPR
1	Nakhon Ratchasima	14	12	2	32	38	18	2.111	1320	1157	1.141
2	Sisaket	14	10	4	30	30	14	2.143	1047	909	1.152
3	Ayutthaya A.T.C.C	14	10	4	30	32	18	1.778	1133	1022	1.109
4	Idea Khonkaen	14	9	5	29	34	21	1.619	1231	1184	1.040
5	Nakhonnont	14	6	8	18	26	30	0.867	1249	1233	1.013
6	Supreme Chonburi	14	6	8	18	23	30	0.767	1177	1202	0.979
7	Suan Sunandha	14	2	12	6	17	40	0.425	1134	1306	0.868
8	Udonthani	14	1	13	5	11	40	0.275	945	1233	0.766

=== Round 1 ===
Date		Score		Set 1	Set 2	Set 3	Set 4	Set 5	Total
22 Dec	Ayutthaya	3–0	Udonthani	25–8	25–11	25–18			75–37
25 Dec	Nakhon Ratchasima	3–2	Nakhonnont	20–25	26–24	25–21	23–25	15–10	109–105
25 Dec	Suan Sunandha	0–3	Sisaket	21–25	13–25	19–25			53–75
28 Dec	Udonthani	0–3	Sisaket	16–25	19–25	12–25			47–75
28 Dec	Suan Sunandha	2–3	Nakhon Ratchasima	33–31	25–22	19–25	20–25	7–15	104–108
28 Dec	Idea Khonkaen	3–1	Supreme Chonburi	27–25	17–25	25–18	25–23		94–91
25 Jan	Nakhon Ratchasima	3–0	Udonthani	25–11	25–18	25–11			75–40
26 Jan	Supreme Chonburi	0–3	Ayutthaya	18–25	18–25	22–25			58–75
26 Jan	Nakhonnont	1–3	Idea Khonkaen	22–25	25–21	16–25	20–25		83–96
1 Feb	Idea Khonkaen	3–0	Suan Sunandha	25–22	25–11	27–25			77–58
1 Feb	Ayutthaya	3–0	Sisaket	25–22	25–23	25–20			75–65
2 Feb	Supreme Chonburi	3–2	Nakhonnont	25–17	25–21	26–28	26–28	17–15	119–109
8 Feb	Nakhonnont	1–3	Ayutthaya	26–24	23–25	24–26	23–25		96–100
9 Feb	Udonthani	0–3	Idea Khonkaen	16–25	14–25	23–25			53–75
9 Feb	Sisaket	0–3	Nakhon Ratchasima	24–26	19–25	18–25			61–76
12 Feb	Suan Sunandha	1–3	Supreme Chonburi	17–25	18–25	25–21	27–29		87–100
15 Feb	Ayutthaya	0–3	Nakhon Ratchasima	21–25	19–25	22–25			62–75
16 Feb	Supreme Chonburi	3–1	Udonthani	25–21	23–25	25–18	25–19		98–80
16 Feb	Idea Khonkaen	3–0	Sisaket	25–20	25–20	25–18			75–58
19 Feb	Nakhonnont	3–1	Suan Sunandha	25–14	25–14	16–25	25–20		91–73
22 Feb	Nakhon Ratchasima	3–2	Idea Khonkaen	22–25	29–31	25–17	25–18	15–9	116–100
23 Feb	Udonthani	3–1	Nakhonnont	23–25	25–20	25–23	25–23		98–91
23 Feb	Suan Sunandha	1–3	Ayutthaya	26–24	15–25	16–25	15–25		72–99
23 Feb	Sisaket	0–3	Supreme Chonburi	23–25	21–25	19–25			63–75
1 Mar	Ayutthaya	3–1	Idea Khonkaen	21–25	25–16	25–12	25–21		96–74
2 Mar	Supreme Chonburi	1–3	Nakhon Ratchasima	19–25	25–21	22–25	17–25		83–96
2 Mar	Nakhonnont	0–3	Sisaket	14–25	25–27	22–25			61–77
2 Mar	Suan Sunandha	3–2	Udonthani	19–25	25–21	30–32	25–13	15–13	114–104

=== Round 2 ===
Date		Score		Set 1	Set 2	Set 3	Set 4	Set 5	Total
8 Mar	Sisaket	3–1	Suan Sunandha	25–12	17–25	25–19	25–19		92–75
8 Mar	Nakhonnont	3–1	Nakhon Ratchasima	25–20	11–25	25–23	25–23		86–91
9 Mar	Supreme Chonburi	0–3	Idea Khonkaen	26–28	23–25	21–25			70–78
9 Mar	Udonthani	0–3	Ayutthaya	13–25	21–25	17–25			51–75
23 Mar	Ayutthaya	3–0	Supreme Chonburi	25–19	25–18	25–16			75–53
23 Mar	Idea Khonkaen	3–1	Nakhonnont	25–23	20–25	25–21	25–20		95–89
23 Mar	Nakhon Ratchasima	3–1	Suan Sunandha	22–25	25–18	25–16	25–22		97–81
23 Mar	Sisaket	3–0	Udonthani	25–21	25–13	25–21			75–55
29 Mar	Udonthani	1–3	Nakhon Ratchasima	22–25	25–23	18–25	15–25		80–98
29 Mar	Suan Sunandha	2–3	Idea Khonkaen	25–19	24–26	25–19	23–25	8–15	104–105
30 Mar	Sisaket	3–0	Ayutthaya	25–14	25–17	25–20			75–51
2 Apr	Nakhonnont	3–2	Supreme Chonburi	25–21	25–11	19–25	31–33	15–10	115–100
5 Apr	Nakhon Ratchasima	1–3	Sisaket	23–25	23–25	25–23	19–25		90–98
5 Apr	Idea Khonkaen	3–1	Udonthani	25–17	19–25	25–23	25–21		94–86
6 Apr	Supreme Chonburi	3–1	Suan Sunandha	25–20	19–25	25–22	25–21		94–88
6 Apr	Ayutthaya	2–3	Nakhonnont	23–25	10–25	28–26	25–13	15–17	101–106
23 Apr	Suan Sunandha	0–3	Nakhonnont	12–25	13–25	17–25			42–75
26 Apr	Ayutthaya	3–1	Suan Sunandha	25–12	15–25	25–22	25–17		90–76
26 Apr	Nakhonnont	3–0	Udonthani	25–12	25–22	25–16			75–50
27 Apr	Supreme Chonburi	0–3	Sisaket	19–25	15–25	19–25			53–75
27 Apr	Idea Khonkaen	2–3	Nakhon Ratchasima	25–21	25–22	20–25	24–26	106–109	
29 Apr	Sisaket	3–0	Idea Khonkaen	26–24	25–15	25–17			76–56
30 Apr	Nakhon Ratchasima	3–0	Ayutthaya	25–21	27–25	25–19			77–65
30 Apr	Udonthani	1–3	Supreme Chonburi	25–22	15–25	18–25	16–25		74–97
3 May	Sisaket	3–0	Nakhonnont	32–30	25–16	25–21			82–67
4 May	Nakhon Ratchasima	3–1	Supreme Chonburi	18–25	25–20	25–19	25–22		93–86
4 May	Udonthani	2–3	Suan Sunandha	25–21	25–20	16–25	16–25	8–15	90–106
4 May	Idea Khonkaen	2–3	Ayutthaya	25–17	25–11	24–26	23–25	10–15	107–94

== Final standing ==
Rank	Team
1st place, gold medalist(s)	Nakhon Ratchasima
2nd place, silver medalist(s)	Sisaket
3rd place, bronze medalist(s)	Ayutthaya A.T.C.C
4	Idea Khonkaen
5	Nakhonnont
6	Supreme Chonburi
7	Suan Sunandha
8	Udonthani

Qualified for the 2014 Asian Club Championship and 2014 Thai-Denmark Super League
Qualified for the 2014 Thai-Denmark Super League
Relegated to Group 2

== Awards ==
Award	Winner	Team
MVP	(Thailand) Hattaya Bamrungsuk	Nakhon Ratchasima
Best outside hitter	(Thailand) Ajcharaporn Kongyot	Supreme Choburi
Best opposite hitter	(Thailand) Maliwan Prabnarong	Udonthani
Best middle blocker	(Vietnam) Nguyen Thi Ngoc Hoa	Ayutthaya A.T.C.C
Best setter	(Thailand) Soraya Phomla	Ayutthaya A.T.C.C
Best receiver	(Thailand) Yupa Sanitklang	Ayutthaya A.T.C.C
Best libero	(Thailand) Tikamporn Changkeaw	Sisaket
