= Nakhon Ratchasima Women's Volleyball Club =

Thai volleyball club

Nakhon Ratchasima The Mall
- Full name: Nakhon Ratchasima Huione QminC
- Short name: Korat
- Nickname: Cat Devil (แคทเดวิล)
- Founded: 2005; 21 years ago
- Ground: The Mall Nakhon Ratchasima; Nakhon Ratchasima, Thailand (Capacity: 2,500)
- Chairman: (Thailand) Chatchawan Wongjorn
- Head coach: (Thailand) Somchai Donpraiyod
- League: Thailand League
- 2023–2024: 1st place
- Championships: Thailand League Champion

Uniforms
Home	Away

Nakhon Ratchasima QminC Women's Volleyball Club (Thai: สโมสรวอลเลย์บอลหญิงนครราชสีมา) is a Thai professional volleyball club based in Nakhon Ratchasima, Thailand.

The club has played at the top level of Thai volleyball for the majority of their existence and is competing in the Thailand League. The club was founded in 2005. Their current home stadium is The Mall Nakhon Ratchasima which has a capacity of 2,500.

== Honors ==
=== Domestic competitions ===
- Thailand League
  - Champion (6): 2006, 2007, 2013–14, 2018–19, 2022–23, 2023–24
  - Runner-up (2): 2017–18, 2020–21
  - Third (7): 2007–08, 2009–10, 2010–11, 2012–13, 2015–16, 2016–17, 2019–20
- Thai-Denmark Super League
  - Runner-up (2): 2014, 2019
  - Third (3): 2016, 2017, 2018

=== International competitions ===
==== Major ====
- Asian Club Championship 5 appearances
  - 2014 — 5th place
  - 2021 — Runner-up
  - 2024 — Third place
  - 2025 — Third place
  - 2026 — Runner-up

==== Minor ====
- VTV Binh Dien Cup
  - 2021 — Cancel

== Former names ==
- Nakhon Ratchasima (2005–2016)
- Nakhon Ratchasima The Mall (2016–2021)
- Nakhon Ratchasima QminC (2021–2022)
- Nakhon Ratchasima Huione QminC (2022–)

== Crest ==
The club logo incorporates elements from their nickname; The Cat Devill and their owner The Mall Nakhon Ratchasima

== Team colors ==
Thailand League

- (2005–2017)
- (2018)
- (2019)
- (2020–2022)
- (2023–present)

Thai-Denmark Super League

- (2005–2019)
- (2019)

== Stadium and locations ==
Coordinates	Location	Stadium	Capacity	Years
14°55′33″N 102°02′46″E	Nakhon Ratchasima	Liptapanlop Hall	3,500	2005–Present
14°58′51″N 102°04′31″E	Nakhon Ratchasima	The Mall Nakhon Ratchasima	2,500	2015–Present

== League results ==
League		Position	Teams	Matches	Win	Lose
Thailand League	2005–06	Champion	8	14	–	–
Thailand League	2006–07	Champion	8	14	–	–
Thailand League	2007–08	3rd place	8	14	–	–
Thailand League	2008–09	–	8	14	–	–
Thailand League	2009–10	3rd place	8	14	10	4
Thailand League	2010–11	3rd place	8	14	–	–
Thailand League	2011–12	4th place	8	14	–	–
Thailand League	2012–13	3rd place	8	14	10	4
Thailand League	2013–14	Champion	8	14	12	2
Thailand League	2014–15	5th place	8	14	7	7
Thailand League	2015–16	3rd place	8	14	9	5
Thailand League	2016–17	3rd place	8	14	10	4
Thailand League	2017–18	Runner-up	8	14	12	2
Thailand League	2018–19	Champion	8	16	16	0
Thailand League	2019–20	3rd place	8	19	9	10
Thailand League	2020–21	Runner-up	8	18	14	4
Thailand League	2022–23	Champion	8	17	12	5
Thailand League	2023–24	Champion	8	17	15	2

== Team roster 2023–24 ==
No.	Player	Position	Date of birth	Height (m)
1	(Thailand) Nuttaporn Sanitklang	Libero	14 August 1991 (age 35)	1.65
2	(Thailand) Nokyoong Paowana	Outside hitter	8 March 1997 (age 29)	1.78
3	(Thailand) Sirima Manakij (c)	Setter	11 January 1991 (age 35)	1.65
4	(Thailand) Donphon Sinpho	Setter	21 June 2004 (age 22)	1.78
5	(Thailand) Patcharaporn Sittisad	Outside hitter	20 February 1996 (age 30)	1.65
6	(Thailand) Onuma Sittirak	Outside hitter	13 June 1986 (age 40)	1.75
8	(Thailand) Thanyarat Srichainat	Opposite	8 September 1997 (age 29)	1.73
9	(Thailand) Amornthip Khumthong	Middle blocker	25 October 2002 (age 23)	1.84
10	(Thailand) Shawiatta Luephoo-Khiew	Setter	3 November 2002 (age 23)	1.69
11	(Thailand) Sasipaporn Janthawisut	Outside Hitter	10 June 1997 (age 29)	1.78
12	(Thailand) Warruni Kanram	Middle blocker	18 September 2004 (age 22)	1.83
13	(United States) Briana Holman	Opposite/Middle blocker	7 October 1994 (age 31)	1.84
14	(Philippines) Celine Domingo	Middle blocker	20 April 1999 (age 27)	1.80
15	(Japan) Kotoe Inoue	Libero	15 February 1990 (age 36)	1.68
16	(Thailand) Kantima Aekpatcha	Outside hitter	7 November 1998 (age 27)	1.75
18	(Thailand) Churirat Saeaung	Opposite	16 December 2000 (age 25)	1.72
19	(Thailand) Papatchaya Phontham	Opposite	24 January 2006 (age 20)	1.76
20	(Thailand) Sirigorn Singsom	Libero	27 July 2000 (age 26)	1.58
26	(Thailand) Kanjana Srisaikaew	Outside Hitter	6 September 2006 (age 20)	1.80
99	(Thailand) Jarasporn Bundasak	Middle blocker	1 March 1993 (age 33)	1.82

=== Team staff ===
As of November 2023

Name	Position	Country
Pathum Panpisood	Chairman	Thailand
Pathum Panpisood	Team Manager	Thailand
Somchai Donpraiyod	Head coach	Thailand
Wanchalarm Ponsri	Assistant coach	Thailand
Natthawut Khonpo	Assistant coach	Thailand
Kriangkrai Sangkeaw	Assistant coach	Thailand
Peemwat Boonjan	Assistant coach	Thailand
Jureeporn Sutcha	Physiotherapist	Thailand

== Sponsors ==
- The Mall Korat
- Kubota
- Fast Fac
- Wana Nawa Hua Hin
- Fbt
- CP
- Seven Eleven
- Nakhon Ratchasima Province
- Government Lottery
- QMin-C
- Chok Yuen Yong

== Position Main ==
- The following is the Khonkaen Star roster in the : 2023–24 Women's Volleyball Thailand League

Nakhon Ratchasrima The Mall VC

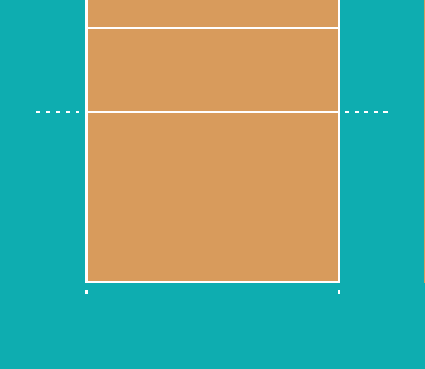

== Imports ==
Season	No.	Name	Position	Country	Competing shows		
Season	No.	Name	Position	Country	Thailand League		Thai-Denmark Super League
Season	No.	Name	Position	Country	leg 1	leg 2	Thai-Denmark Super League
2018–19	12	Mai Okumura	Middle blocker	Japan	✔		
2018–19	21	Yeliz Başa	Outside hitter	Turkey	–	✔	
2019–20	8	Rebecca Perry	Outside hitter	United States	✔	–	
2019–20	17	Strashimira Simeonova	Middle blocker	Bulgaria	✔		–
2019–20	11	Daimí Ramírez	Opposite	Cuba	–	✔	–
2020–21	21	Yeliz Başa	Outside hitter	Turkey	✔	–	
2021–22	7	Mylene Paat	Opposite hitter	Philippines	✔		–
2021–22	21	Dindin Santiago	Middle blocker	Philippines	–	✔	–
2022–23	21	Alli Cudworth	Opposite hitter	United States of America	–	✔	–
2022–23	5	Lawren Metthews	Middle blocker	United States of America	–	✔	–
2023–24	13	Briana Holman	Opposite/Middle blocker	United States of America	✔		–
2023–24	14	Celine Domingo	Middle blocker	Philippines	✔		–
2023–24	15	Kotoe Inoue	Libero	Japan	✔		–

== Head coach ==
Years	Name
2005–2015	(Thailand) Suttichai Chanbanchee
2015–2016	(Thailand) Padejsuk Wannachote
2016–2017	(Thailand) Chamnan Dokmai
2017–2018	(Thailand) Banthoeng Khawpong
2018–2019	(Thailand) Wanna Buakaew
2019–2021	(Thailand) Padejsuk Wannachote
2022–2023	(Thailand) Anusorn Bundit
2023–	(Thailand) Somchai Donpraiyod

== Team Captains ==
- (Thailand) Konwika Apinyapong (2005–2013)
- (Thailand) Wilawan Apinyapong (2013–2015)
- (Thailand) Hattaya Bamrungsuk (2015–2017)
- (Thailand) Onuma Sittirak (2017–2019)
- (Thailand) Yaowalak Mahaon (2019)
- (Thailand) Nootsara Tomkom (2019–2020)
- (Thailand) Chatchu-on Moksri (2020–2021)
- (Thailand) Sirima Manakit (2021–present)

== Notable players ==
Domestic Players

Thailand

- Konwika Apinyapong
- Rasamee Supamool
- Wanida Kotruang
- Jarunee Sannok
- Wirawan Sattayanuchit
- Wilawan Apinyapong
- Phanida Artwet
- Pornnapat Kongklang
- Sornsawan Kasanthing
- Hattaya Bamrungsuk
- Chatchu-on Moksri
- Chutima Srisaikaew
- Ploypailin Kanklang
- Piyatida Theeratjirod
- Lamyai Jansod
- Chanida Meechai
- Wiranyupa Inchan
- Onuma Sittirak
- Jarasporn Bundasak
- Malika Kanthong
- Jureerat Saeaung
- Amporn Hyapha
- Nootsara Tomkom
- Chatchu-on Moksri

Foreign players

Japan

- Mai Okumura (2018–2019)
- Kotoe Inoue (2023-2024)

Turkey

- Yeliz Başa (2019), (2020–2021)

Bulgaria

- Strashimira Filipova (2019)

United States

- Rebecca Perry (2019)

Cuba

- Daimí Ramírez (2019)

Philippines

- Mylene Paat (2020–2021)
- Dindin Santiago-Manabat (2020–2021)
- Celine Domingo (2023-2024)

United States

- Alli Cudworth (2022–2023)
- Lawren Methhews (2022–2023)
