= 2014 Women's Volleyball Thai-Denmark Super League =

Tournament details
- Host country: MCC Hall of The Mall Bangkapi Bangkok, Thailand
- Dates: 8 – 12 May 2014
- Teams: 6
- Venue: 1 (in 1 host city)

Final positions
- Champions: Ayutthaya A.T.C.C. (1st title)

Tournament awards
- MVP: (Thailand) Soraya Phomla

2014 Women's Volleyball Thai-Denmark Super League (Thai: วอลเลย์บอลหญิงไทยเดนมาร์คซูเปอร์ลีก 2014) was the second edition of the tournament. It was held at the MCC Hall of The Mall Bangkapi in Bangkok, Thailand from 8 – 12 May 2014.

== Teams ==
1. Ayutthaya A.T.C.C.
2. Idea Khonkaen
3. Nakhonnon
4. Nakhon Ratchasima
5. Sisaket
6. Supreme Chonburi

== Pools composition ==
Pool A	Pool B
Nakhon Ratchasima; Ayutthaya A.T.C.C.; Nakhonnon	Sisaket; Idea Khonkaen; Supreme Chonburi

== Preliminary round ==
=== Pool A ===
Pos	Team	Pld	W	L	Pts	SW	SL	SR	SPW	SPL	SPR	Qualification
1	Nakhon Ratchasima	2	2	0	6	6	2	3.000	189	183	1.033	Semifinals
2	Ayutthaya A.T.C.C.	2	1	1	3	4	4	1.000	188	180	1.044	Semifinals
3	Nakhonnon	2	0	2	0	2	6	0.333	171	185	0.924	

Date	Time		Score		Set 1	Set 2	Set 3	Set 4	Set 5	Total	Report
8 May	15:00	Nakhon Ratchasima	3–1	Ayutthaya A.T.C.C.	27-25	17-25	27-25	25-21		96–0	
9 May	15:00	Ayutthaya A.T.C.C.	3–1	Nakhonnon	17-25	25-19	25-20	25-20		92–0	
10 May	16:00	Nakhon Ratchasima	3–1	Nakhonnon	18-25	25-22	25-19	25-21		93–0	

=== Pool B ===
Pos	Team	Pld	W	L	Pts	SW	SL	SR	SPW	SPL	SPR	Qualification
1	Idea Khonkaen	2	2	0	4	6	4	1.500	217	213	1.019	Semifinals
2	Sisaket	2	1	1	3	5	5	1.000	206	194	1.062	Semifinals
3	Supreme Chonburi	2	0	2	2	4	6	0.667	202	218	0.927	

Date	Time		Score		Set 1	Set 2	Set 3	Set 4	Set 5	Total	Report
7 May	17:30	Sisaket	3–2	Supreme Chonburi	25-16	16-25	23-25	25-17	15-8	104–0	
8 May	17:30	Supreme Chonburi	2–3	Idea Khonkaen	23-25	25-23	27-25	22-25	14-16	111–0	
9 May	20:30	Sisaket	2–3	Idea Khonkaen	23-25	25-17	25-21	18-25	11-15	102–0	

== Final round ==
Semifinals
11 May
Nakhon Ratchasima	3
Sisaket	0
11 May
Idea Khonkaen	0
Ayutthaya A.T.C.C.	3

Final
12 May
Nakhon Ratchasima	0
Ayutthaya A.T.C.C.	3
3rd place match
12 May
Sisaket	3
Idea Khonkaen	2

=== Semifinals ===
Date	Time		Score		Set 1	Set 2	Set 3	Set 4	Set 5	Total	Report
11 May	15:00	Nakhon Ratchasima	3–0	Sisaket	25-17	25-21	25-15			75–0	75-53
11 May	17:00	Idea Khonkaen	0–3	Ayutthaya A.T.C.C.	22-25	14-25	19-25			55–0	55-75

=== 3rd place ===
Date	Time		Score		Set 1	Set 2	Set 3	Set 4	Set 5	Total	Report
12 May	13:00	Sisaket	3–2	Idea Khonkaen	20–25	26–24	25–17	26–28	16–14	113–108	

=== Final ===
Date	Time		Score		Set 1	Set 2	Set 3	Set 4	Set 5	Total	Report
12 May	17:00	Nakhon Ratchasima	0–3	Ayutthaya A.T.C.C.	17–25	18–25	22–25			57–75	

== Final standing ==
Rank	Team
1st place, gold medalist(s)	Ayutthaya A.T.C.C.
2nd place, silver medalist(s)	Nakhon Ratchasima
3rd place, bronze medalist(s)	Sisaket
4	Idea Khonkaen
5	Nakhonnon
5	Supreme Chonburi

== See also ==
- 2014 Men's Volleyball Thai-Denmark Super League
