= 2013 Women's Volleyball Thai-Denmark Super League =

Tournament details
- Host country: MCC Hall of The Mall Ngamwongwan Nonthaburi, Thailand
- Dates: 8 – 11 June 2013
- Teams: 8
- Venue: 1 (in 1 host city)

Final positions
- Champions: Idea Khonkaen (1st title)

Tournament awards
- MVP: (Thailand) Onuma Sittirak

2013 Women's Volleyball Thai-Denmark Super League (Thai: วอลเลย์บอลหญิงไทยเดนมาร์คซูเปอร์ลีก 2013) was the first edition of the tournament. It was held at the MCC Hall of The Mall Ngamwongwan in Nonthaburi, Thailand from 8 – 11 June 2013.

== Qualification ==
Team
Nakhon Ratchasima
Ayutthaya A.T.C.C
Nakhonnon
Samut Prakan
Suan Sunandha
Sisaket
Supreme Chonburi
Idea Khonkaen

== Final round ==
=== 1st-8th places ===
Quarterfinals
8 June
Ayutthaya A.T.C.C	3
Samut Prakan	0
9 June
Idea Khonkaen	3
Sisaket	0
8 June
Nakhon Ratchasima	2
Supreme Chonburi	3
9 June
Nakhonnon	3
Suan Sunandha	0

Semifinals
10 June – 17.00
Ayutthaya A.T.C.C	1
Idea Khonkaen	3
10 June – 19.00
Supreme Chonburi	3
Nakhonnon	2

Final
11 June – 15.00
Idea Khonkaen	3
Supreme Chonburi	0
3rd place
Ayutthaya A.T.C.C	3
Nakhonnon	2

5th–8th semifinals
10 June – 13.00
Nakhon Ratchasima	2
Sisaket	3
10 June – 15.00
Suan Sunandha	3
Samut Prakan	2

5th place match
11 June – 10.00
Sisaket	0
Suan Sunandha	3
7th place
11 June – 17.00
Nakhon Ratchasima	3
Samut Prakan	1

=== Quarterfinals round ===
Date	Time		Score		Set 1	Set 2	Set 3	Set 4	Set 5	Total	Report
8 June	14:00	Ayutthaya A.T.C.C	3–0	Samut Prakan	25–11	25–15	25–11			75–37	
8 June	16:00	Nakhon Ratchasima	2–3	Supreme Chonburi	21–25	18–25	25–11	25–23	12–15	101–99	
9 June	14:00	Nakhonnon	3–0	Suan Sunandha	25–20	25–15	25–17			75–52	
9 June	16:00	Idea Khonkaen	3–0	Sisaket	25–7	25–23	25–20			75–50	

=== 5th–8th places ===
Date	Time		Score		Set 1	Set 2	Set 3	Set 4	Set 5	Total	Report
10 June	13:00	Nakhon Ratchasima	2–3	Sisaket	24–26	20–25	25–21	25–15	8–15	102–102	
10 June	15:00	Suan Sunanfha	3–2	Samut Prakan	26–24	25–20	21–25	15–25	15–18	102–112	

=== Semifinals ===
Date	Time		Score		Set 1	Set 2	Set 3	Set 4	Set 5	Total	Report
10 June	17:00	Ayutthaya A.T.C.C	1–3	Idea Khonkaen	25–20	18–25	18–25	25–27		86–97	
10 June	19:00	Nakhonnon	2–3	Supreme Chonburi	23–25	25–19	21–25	25–20	15–17	109–106	

=== 7th place ===
Date	Time		Score		Set 1	Set 2	Set 3	Set 4	Set 5	Total	Report
11 June	17:00	Nakhon Ratchasima	3–1	Samut Prakan	25–20	25–14	24–26	25–20		99–80	

=== 5th place ===
Date	Time		Score		Set 1	Set 2	Set 3	Set 4	Set 5	Total	Report
11 June	10:00	Sisaket	0–3	Suan Sunandha	23–25	23–25	11–25			57–75	

=== 3rd place ===
Date	Time		Score		Set 1	Set 2	Set 3	Set 4	Set 5	Total	Report
11 June	12:00	Ayutthaya A.T.C.C	3–2	Nakhonnon	25–21	20–25	12–25	25–15	15–11	97–97	

=== Final ===
Date	Time		Score		Set 1	Set 2	Set 3	Set 4	Set 5	Total	Report
11 June	15:00	Idea Khonkaen	3–0	Supreme Chonburi	25–19	25–21	25–20			75–60	

== Final standing ==
Rank	Team
1st place, gold medalist(s)	Idea Khonkaen
2nd place, silver medalist(s)	Supreme Chonburi
3rd place, bronze medalist(s)	Ayutthaya A.T.C.C.
4	Nakhonnon
5	Suan Sunandha
6	Sisaket
7	Nakhon Ratchasima
8	Samut Prakan
