= 2019–20 Women's Volleyball Thailand League =

Thai volleyball league season

2020 Women's Volleyball Thailand League
- Dates: 18 January – 30 July 2020
- Teams: 8
- Venue: (in 5 host cities)

Final positions
- Champions: Supreme Chonburi (3rd title)
- Runners-up: Khonkaen Star
- Third place: Nakhon Ratchasima
- Fourth place: 3BB Nakornnont

Tournament awards
- MVP: (Thailand) Ajcharaporn Kongyot (Generali Supreme Chonburi)

Tournament statistics
- Matches played: 56 (Regular seasons); 4 (Final series)

The 2019–20 Women's Volleyball Thailand League is the 15th season of the Women's Volleyball Thailand League, the top Thai professional league for women's volleyball clubs, since its establishment in 2005, also known as CP Women's Volleyball Thailand League due to the sponsorship deal with Charoen Pokphand. A total of 8 teams will compete in the league. The season will begin on 18 January 2020 and concluded on 30 July 2019. This season will be organized by the Thailand Volleyball Association (TVA) instead Thailand Volleyball Co., Ltd. The season started.

== Teams ==
Eight teams compete in the league – the top six teams from the previous season and the two teams promoted from the Pro Challenge. The promoted teams are Diamond Food and Rangsit University. Rangsit University retains its position after relegation in previous season, while Diamond Food reaches a top division for the first time. Diamond Food replaced King Bangkok (relegated after four years in the top division).

=== Qualified teams ===
League positions of the previous season shown in parentheses (TH: Thailand League title holders; SL: Supur League title holders).

Qualified teams for 2019–20 Volleyball Thailand League (by entry round) Regular seasons
Team	Province	Affiliated
Proflex (n/a)	Bangkok	Power Cooperation
Supreme^{SL} (2nd)	Chonburi	Supreme Distribution
Khonkaenstar (4th)	Khon Kaen	No Affiliation
Nakhon Ratchasima^{TH} (1st)	Nakhon Ratchasima	Sport Association of Nakhon Ratchasima Province
Nakornnonthaburi (3rd)	Nonthaburi	Nakornnonthaburi XI Sports School, Nonthaburi City Municipality
Opart 369 (6th)	Nonthaburi	Suankularb Wittayalai Nonthaburi School

Pro Challenge
Team	Province	Affiliated
King Bangkok	Bangkok	Bangkok Sport School, Bangkok Metropolitan Administration
Rangsit University	Pathum Thani	Rangsit University
Diamond Food	Samut Sakhon	Diamond Food Product
Nakhon Hatyai	Songkhla	Nakhon Hatyai Technology College

=== Personnel and kits ===
Team	Round	Manager	Coach	Captain	Kit manufacturer	Kit sponsors
Bangkok	Pro Challenge	(Thailand) Anucha Srirungreung	(Thailand) Rakpong Chancharoen	(Thailand) Sumalai Prasopsuk	Grand Sport	King Rice Bran Oil
Diamond Food	Pro Challenge	(Thailand) Decha Suvalak	(Thailand) Wanna Buakaew	(Thailand) Onuma Sittirak	Grand Sport	Diamond Food
Diamond Food	Regular	(Thailand) Decha Suvalak	(Thailand) Wanna Buakaew	(Thailand) Onuma Sittirak	Grand Sport	Diamond Food, Fine Chef
Khonkaen Star	Regular	(Thailand) Panya Pollayut	(Thailand) Apirat Ngammeerit	(Thailand) Tapaphaipun Chaisri	Kela	Thai-Denmark, KKTT, Toyota Kaennakorn, North Eastern University
Nakhon Hat Yai	Pro Challenge	(Thailand) Thanawat Promchinda	(Thailand) Mongkon Pieumsamut	(Thailand) Kotchakorn Sapseub	FBT	No sponsor
Nakhon Ratchasima	Regular	(Thailand) Thawatchai Yuenyong	(Thailand) Padejsuk Wannachote	(Thailand) Yaowalak Mahaon	FBT	The Mall, CP, 7-Eleven, Kubota, Thai lottery, Koh-Kae, Vana Nava, Adda
Nakornnonthaburi	Regular	(Thailand) Parawee Hoisang	(Thailand) Thanakit Inleang	(Thailand) Narumon Khanan	Grand Sport	3BB Internet
Opart 369	Regular	(Thailand) Ronnarit Mongkolrat	(Thailand) Suthep Thongsri	(Thailand) Arisa Promnok	Kela	No sponsor
Proflex	Regular	(Thailand) Sumit Korana	(Thailand) Phataranat Deema	(Thailand) Thanyarat Srichainat	Kela	Proflex, Thai AirAsia, Gulf Energy, Salming, Mybacin
Rangsit University	Pro Challenge	(Thailand) Chanchai Suksuvan	(Thailand) Suwat Jeerapan	(Thailand) Kanjana Kuthaisong	Kela	Est Cola
Rangsit University	Regular	(Thailand) Chanchai Suksuvan	(Thailand) Suwat Jeerapan	(Thailand) Pattrathip Santakoon	Kela	Rangsit University, Thai AirAsia, Mybacin, Gulf Energy, Bangchak
Supreme	Regular	(Thailand) Thanadit Prasopnet	(Thailand) Nataphon Srisamutnak	(Thailand) Wilavan Apinyapong	Mizuno	Supreme, Generali, Brother, Samsung Knox, Acer, Jetts Fitness, VST ECS, Synnex

== Squads ==
=== National team players ===
- Players name in **bold** indicates the player is registered during the mid-season transfer window.

Team	Player 1	Player 2	Player 3	Player 4	Free player 1	Free player 2
Diamond Food	Onuma Sittirak	Malika Kanthong				
Khonkaenstar	Pornpun Guedpard	Tikamporn Changkeaw			Thatdao Nuekjang	Chitaporn Kamlangmak
Nakhon Ratchasima	Chatchu-on Moksri	Yupa Sanitklang	**Nootsara Tomkom**		Wanitchaya Luangtonglang	
Nakornnonthaburi					Pimpichaya Kokram	Tichaya Boonlert
Supreme	Piyanut Pannoy	Pleumjit Thinkaow	Wilavan Apinyapong	**Ajcharaporn Kongyot**	Supattra Pairoj	Watchareeya Nuanjam

=== Foreign players ===
- Players name in **bold** indicates the player is registered during the mid-season transfer window.

Team	Player 1	Player 2	Player 3
Diamond Food	(United States) Tiana Dockery	(China) **Zheng Yixin**	(China) **Du Qingqing**
Nakhon Ratchasima	(Italy) Rebecca Perry	(Bulgaria) Strashimira Simeonova	(Cuba) **Daimí Ramírez**
Nakornnonthaburi	(Colombia) Alexandra Garcia	(Brazil) Caroline Dias Godoi	
Supreme	(China) Zhang Xiaoya	(China) Jie Sun	

== Schedule ==
Stage	Week	Days	Venue
First leg	1	18–22 January 2020	MCC Hall The Mall Bangkapi, Bangkok
First leg	2	25–29 January 2020	MCC Hall The Mall Bangkapi, Bangkok
First leg	3	1–5 February 2020	MCC Hall The Mall Korat, Nakhon Ratchasima
First leg	4	8–12 February 2020	MCC Hall The Mall Korat, Nakhon Ratchasima
First leg	5	15–16 February 2020	Eastern National Sports Training Center, Pattaya
Second leg	1	22–26 February 2020	MCC Hall The Mall Bangkapi, Bangkok
Second leg	2	29 February–4 March 2020	MCC Hall The Mall Bangkapi, Bangkok
Second leg	3	7–11 March 2020	Keelawes 1 Gymnasium, Bangkok
Second leg	4	14–15 March 2020	MCC Hall The Mall Korat, Nakhon Ratchasima
Final series	1	21–23 July 2020	MCC Hall The Mall Bangkapi, Bangkok
Final series	2	28–30 July 2020	MCC Hall The Mall Bangkapi, Bangkok

== Format ==
Regular seasons

- First leg (Week 1–5): single round-robin; The eighth place will relegate to Pro League.
- Second leg: (Week 6–9) single round-robin; The top four will advance to Final series and the seventh place will relegate to Pro League.

Final series

- First leg (Week 10): single round-robin.
- Second leg: (Week 11) single round-robin.

=== Standing procedure ===
1. Number of matches won
2. Match points
3. Sets ratio
4. Points ratio
5. Result of the last match between the tied teams

Match won 3–0 or 3–1: 3 match points for the winner, 0 match points for the loser
Match won 3–2: 2 match points for the winner, 1 match point for the loser

== Regular seasons – First leg ==
=== First leg table ===
Pos	Team	Pld	W	L	Pts	SW	SL	SR	SPW	SPL	SPR	Qualification
1	Khonkaen Star	7	6	1	18	18	4	4.500	522	406	1.286	Second leg
2	Generali Supreme Chonburi	7	5	2	16	17	7	2.429	554	451	1.228	Second leg
3	3BB Nakornnont	7	5	2	15	17	7	2.429	577	486	1.187	Second leg
4	Diamond Food	7	5	2	14	15	8	1.875	522	444	1.176	Second leg
5	Nakhon Ratchasima The Mall	7	4	3	12	13	10	1.300	525	489	1.074	Second leg
6	Rangsit University	7	2	5	4	6	19	0.316	451	586	0.770	Second leg
7	Proflex	7	1	6	4	5	19	0.263	404	583	0.693	Second leg
8	Opart 369	7	0	7	1	4	21	0.190	488	598	0.816	Relegation to Pro League

=== Week 1 ===
- Venue: MCC Hall The Mall Bangkapi, Bangkok
- Dates: 18–22 January 2020

Date	Time		Score		Set 1	Set 2	Set 3	Set 4	Set 5	Total	Report
18 Jan	18:00	Diamond Food	3–0	Nakhon Ratchasima The Mall	25–16	25–24	26–24			76–64	
18 Jan	21:00	3BB Nakornnont	1–3	Khonkaen Star	20–25	25–20	26–28	21–25		92–98	
19 Jan	12:00	Opart 369	2–3	Rangsit University	25–20	25–19	22–25	20–25	12–15	104–104	
19 Jan	21:00	Proflex	0–3	Generali Supreme Chonburi	5–25	16–25	10–25			31–75	
22 Jan	15:00	Khonkaen Star	3–0	Rangsit University	25–10	25–14	25–9			75–33	
22 Jan	18:00	Nakhon Ratchasima The Mall	3–1	3BB Nakornnont	25–21	25–23	21–25	25–19		96–88	

=== Week 2 ===
- Venue: MCC Hall The Mall Bangkapi, Bangkok
- Dates: 25–29 January 2020

Date	Time		Score		Set 1	Set 2	Set 3	Set 4	Set 5	Total	Report
25 Jan	12.00	Opart 369	1–3	Proflex	23–25	26–28	25–20	22–25		96–98	
25 Jan	21.00	Generali Supreme Chonburi	3–0	Khonkaen Star	25–18	25–19	25–12			75–49	
26 Jan	18.00	Rangsit University	0–3	Nakhon Ratchasima The Mall	19–25	19–25	19–25			57–75	
26 Jan	21.00	3BB Nakornnont	3–0	Diamond Food	26–24	25–23	25–22			76–69	
29 Jan	12.00	Diamond Food	3–0	Proflex	25–6	25–9	25–14			75–29	
29 Jan	15.00	Khonkaen Star	3–0	Opart 369	25–14	25–18	25–19			75–51	

=== Week 3 ===
- Venue: MCC Hall The Mall Korat, Nakhon Ratchasima
- Dates: 1–5 February 2020

Date	Time		Score		Set 1	Set 2	Set 3	Set 4	Set 5	Total	Report
1 Feb	12.00	Rangsit University	3–2	Proflex	25–21	22–25	25–11	25–27	15–12	112–96	
1 Feb	21.00	Nakhon Ratchasima The Mall	1–3	Generali Supreme Chonburi	24–26	25–19	22–25	16–25		87–95	
2 Feb	18.00	3BB Nakornnont	3–1	Opart 369	21–25	25–18	25–19	25–16		96–78	
2 Feb	21.00	Diamond Food	0–3	Khonkaen Star	18–25	21–25	14–25			53–75	
5 Feb	12.00	Proflex	0–3	Nakhon Ratchasima The Mall	16–25	14–25	13–25			43–75	
5 Feb	18.00	Generali Supreme Chonburi	3–0	Opart 369	25–15	25–20	25–19			75–54	

=== Week 4 ===
- Venue: MCC Hall The Mall Korat, Nakhon Ratchasima
- Dates: 8–12 February 2020

Date	Time		Score		Set 1	Set 2	Set 3	Set 4	Set 5	Total	Report
8 Feb	15.00	3BB Nakornnont	3–0	Proflex	25–23	25–15	25–11			75–49	
8 Feb	21.00	Generali Supreme Chonburi	3–0	Rangsit University	25–21	25–16	25–19			75–56	
9 Feb	15.00	Opart 369	0–3	Diamond Food	17–25	15–25	18–25			50–75	
9 Feb	21.00	Nakhon Ratchasima The Mall	0–3	Khonkaen Star	12–25	23–25	20–25			55–75	
12 Feb	12.00	Rangsit University	0–3	3BB Nakornnont	20–25	15–25	11–25			46–75	
12 Feb	18.00	Generali Supreme Chonburi	2–3	Diamond Food	25–17	23–25	23–25	25–17	13–15	109–99	

=== Week 5 ===
- Venue: Eastern National Sports Training Center, Pattaya
- Dates: 15–16 February 2020

Date	Time		Score		Set 1	Set 2	Set 3	Set 4	Set 5	Total	Report
15 Feb	18.00	Khonkaen Star	3–0	Proflex	25–19	25–17	25–11			75–47	
15 Feb	21.00	Opart 369	0–3	Nakhon Ratchasima The Mall	14–25	22–25	19–25			55–75	
16 Feb	15.00	Diamond Food	3–0	Rangsit University	25–14	25–15	25–14			75–43	
16 Feb	21.00	3BB Nakornnont	3–0	Generali Supreme Chonburi	25–20	25–19	25–11			75–50	

== Regular seasons – Second leg ==
=== Second leg table ===
Pos	Team	Pld	W	L	Pts	SW	SL	SR	SPW	SPL	SPR	Qualification
1	Supreme Chonburi	6	6	0	17	18	3	6.000	516	372	1.387	Final series
2	Khonkaen Star	6	5	1	14	16	7	2.286	525	467	1.124	Final series
3	Nakhon Ratchasima	6	3	3	12	14	10	1.400	534	500	1.068	Final series
4	3BB Nakornnont	6	3	3	10	12	11	1.091	503	471	1.068	Final series
5	Diamond Food	6	3	3	8	10	11	0.909	477	438	1.089	Not passed into Final series
6	Proflex	6	1	5	3	4	16	0.250	314	487	0.645	Not passed into Final series
7	Rangsit University	6	0	6	0	2	18	0.111	365	499	0.731	Not passed into Final series

=== Week 6 ===
- Venue: MCC Hall The Mall Bangkapi, Bangkok
- Dates: 22–26 February 2020

Date	Time		Score		Set 1	Set 2	Set 3	Set 4	Set 5	Total	Report
22 Feb	15.00	Khonkaen Star	3–0	Proflex	25–17	25–15	25–11			75–43	
22 Feb	21.00	Supreme Chonburi	3–0	Rangsit University	25–16	25–5	25–17			75–38	
23 Feb	15.00	3BB Nakornnont	3–1	Proflex	21–25	25–14	25–11	25–10		96–60	
23 Feb	21.00	Diamond Food	0–3	Nakhon Ratchasima	23–25	22–25	22–25			67–75	
26 Feb	15.00	3BB Nakornnont	2–3	Diamond Food	25–23	18–25	15–25	25–18	10–15	93–106	
26 Feb	18.00	Supreme Chonburi	3–2	Nakhon Ratchasima	25–18	23–25	21–25	25–10	16–14	110–92	

=== Week 7 ===
- Venue: MCC Hall The Mall Bangkapi, Bangkok
- Dates: 29 February–4 March 2020

Date	Time		Score		Set 1	Set 2	Set 3	Set 4	Set 5	Total	Report
29 Feb	18.00	Nakhon Ratchasima	3–1	Rangsit University	25–21	25–27	25–18	25–13		100–79	
29 Feb	21.00	Khonkaen Star	1–3	Supreme Chonburi	26–24	24–26	13–25	17–25		80–100	
1 Mar	18.00	3BB Nakornnont	3–0	Rangsit University	25–8	25–17	25–20			75–45	
1 Mar	21.00	Diamond Food	3–0	Proflex	25–14	25–20	25–11			75–45	
4 Mar	15.00	Khonkaen Star	3–1	Diamond Food	25–16	18–25	25–16	25–23		93–80	
4 Mar	18.00	Supreme Chonburi	3–0	3BB Nakornnont	25–17	25–20	26–24			76–61	

=== Week 8 ===
- Venue: MCC Hall The Mall Bangkapi, Bangkok
- Dates: 7–11 March 2020

Date	Time		Score		Set 1	Set 2	Set 3	Set 4	Set 5	Total	Report
7 Mar	15.00	Nakhon Ratchasima	1–3	3BB Nakornnont	17–25	21–25	25–20	26–28		89–98	
7 Mar	21.00	Supreme Chonburi	3–0	Diamond Food	25–23	28–26	27–25			80–74	
8 Mar	18.00	Nakhon Ratchasima	3–0	Proflex	25–12	25–11	25–16			75–39	
8 Mar	21.00	Khonkaen Star	3–0	Rangsit University	25–20	25–20	25–20			75–60	
11 Mar	09.00	Rangsit University	1–3	Proflex	25–23	24–26	22–25	20–25		91–99	
11 Mar	18.00	Khonkaen Star	3–1	3BB Nakornnont	25–19	25–16	20–25	25-21		95–60	

=== Week 9 ===
- Venue: MCC Hall The Mall Korat, Nakhon Ratchasima
- Dates: 14–15 March 2020

Date	Time		Score		Set 1	Set 2	Set 3	Set 4	Set 5	Total	Report
14 Mar	15.00	Supreme Chonburi	3–0	Proflex	25–10	25–7	25–11			75–28	
14 Mar	21.00	Nakhon Ratchasima	2–3	Khonkaen Star	27–29	27–25	15–25	25–13	9–15	103–107	
15 Mar	18.00	Rangsit University	0–3	Diamond Food	15–25	19–25	18–25			52–75	

== Final series ==
=== Final series table ===
Pos	Team	Pld	W	L	Pts	SW	SL	SR	SPW	SPL	SPR	Final result
1	Supreme Chonburi	6	6	0	16	18	5	3.600	532	423	1.258	Champions
2	Khonkaen Star	6	2	4	9	14	11	1.273	526	530	0.992	Runners-up
3	Nakhon Ratchasima	6	2	4	6	6	14	0.429	402	478	0.841	Third Place
4	3BB Nakornnont	6	2	4	5	8	14	0.571	459	463	0.991	Fourth Place

=== Week 10 ===
==== Final Series Week 1 ====
- Venue: MCC Hall The Mall Bangkapi, Bangkok
- Dates: 18–22 March 2020

Date	Time		Score		Set 1	Set 2	Set 3	Set 4	Set 5	Total	Report
21 July	13:00	Khonkaen Star	3–0	Nakhon Ratchasima	25–13	25–21	25–23			75–57	
21 July	19:00	Supreme Chonburi	3–1	3BB Nakornnont	16–25	25–21	25–20	25–14		91–80	
22 July	16:00	Nakhon Ratchasima	0–3	Supreme Chonburi	19–25	13–25	17–25			49–75	
22 July	19:00	Khonkaen Star	3–0	3BB Nakornnont	25–22	25–18	25–10			75–50	
23 July	16:00	3BB Nakornnont	3–0	Nakhon Ratchasima	25–22	25–14	25–14			75–50	
23 July	19:00	Supreme Chonburi	3–2	Khonkaen Star	20–25	22–25	25–10	25–20	15–10	107–90	

=== Week 11 ===
==== Final Series Week 2 ====
- Venue: MCC Hall The Mall Bangkapi, Bangkok
- Dates: 28–30 March 2020

Date	Time		Score		Set 1	Set 2	Set 3	Set 4	Set 5	Total	Report
28 July	13.00	Supreme Chonburi	3–0	Nakhon Ratchasima	25–15	25–15	25–21			75–51	
28 July	19.00	3BB Nakornnont	3–2	Khonkaen Star	19–25	25–21	25–18	24–26	15–11	108–101	
29 July	16.00	Nakhon Ratchasima	3–1	Khonkaen Star	24–26	25–20	25–20	25–21		99–87	
29 July	19.00	Supreme Chonburi	3–0	3BB Nakornnont	25–19	25–22	25–14			75–55	
30 July	16.00	Nakhon Ratchasima	3–1	3BB Nakornnont	25–20	21–25	25–23	25–23		96–91	
30 July	19.00	Supreme Chonburi	3–2	Khonkaen Star	28–30	25–14	16–25	25–21	15–8	109–98	

== Final standing ==
Rank	Team
1st place, gold medalist(s)	Generali Supreme Chonburi-E.Tech
2nd place, silver medalist(s)	Khonkaen Star VC
3rd place, bronze medalist(s)	Nakhon Ratchasima The Mall VC
4	3BB Nakornnont
5	Diamond Food VC
6	Proflex VC
7	Rangsit University VC
8	Opart 369 VC

Qualified for the Asian Championship
Relegated to Pro Challenge

2019–20 Women's Thailand League

Champion
Supreme Chonburi (third title)
Team roster
Supattra Pairoj,Wipawee Srithong,Sasiwimol Sangpan,Pleumjit Thinkaow,Patcharaporn Sittisad,Tirawan Sang-ob,Sutadta Chuewulim,Wilavan Apinyapong (c),Nampueng Khamart,Pattiya Juangjan,Waraporn Poomjaroen,Watchareeya Nuanjam,Ajcharaporn Kongyot,Soraya Phomla,Thanacha Sooksod,Napatsorn Ammarinrat,Zhang Xiaoya,Jie Sun (volleyball player)
Head coach
Nataphon Srisamutnak

== Awards ==
- Most valuable player
  (Thailand) Ajcharaporn Kongyot (Generali Supreme Chonburi)
- Best Best Scorer
  (Thailand) Chatchu-on Moksri (Nakhon Ratchasima The Mall)
- Best outside spiker
  (Thailand) Sutadta Chuewulim (Generali Supreme Chonburi)
  (Thailand) Chatchu-on Moksri (Nakhon Ratchasima The Mall)
- Best servers
  (Thailand) Soraya Phomla (Generali Supreme Chonburi)
- Best middle blocker
  (Thailand) Thatdao Nuekjang (Khonkaen Star)
  (Thailand) Pleumjit Thinkaow (Generali Supreme Chonburi)
- Best setter
  (Thailand) Pornpun Guedpard (Khonkaen Star)
- Best opposite spiker
  (Thailand) Pimpichaya Kokram (3BB Nakornnont)
- Best libero
  (Thailand) Tikamporn Changkeaw (Khonkaen Star)
