= 2021–22 Women's Volleyball Thailand League =

2022 Women's Volleyball Thailand League
- Dates: 8 December 2021 – 27 February 2022
- Teams: 8
- Venue: (in 2 host cities)

Tournament statistics
- Matches played: 56 (Regular seasons); 4 (Final series)

The 2021–22 Women's Volleyball Thailand League is the 17th season of the Women's Volleyball Thailand League, the top Thai professional league for women's volleyball clubs, since its establishment in 2005, also known as Daikin Women's Volleyball Thailand League due to the sponsorship deal with Daikin. A total of 8 teams will compete in the league. The season will begin on 12 November 2020 and is scheduled to conclude in 2021. This season will be organized by the Thailand Volleyball Association (TVA) instead Thailand Volleyball Co., Ltd. The season started.

== Teams ==
Eight teams compete in the league – the top six teams from the previous season and the two teams promoted from the Pro Challenge. The promoted teams are Black power Udonthani and Kasetsart university. Black power Udonthani VC reaches a top division for the first time and Kasetsart university at 2nd top division for the first time. Black power Udonthani replaced RSU VC (relegated after four years in the top division) and Kasetsart university replaced Samut Prakan VC (relegated after four years in the top division).

=== Qualified teams ===
League positions of the previous season shown in parentheses (TH: Thailand League title holders; SL: Super League title holders).

Qualified teams for 2019–20 Volleyball Thailand League (by entry round) Regular seasons
Team	Province	Affiliated
Proflex (6th)	Bangkok	Power Cooperation
Supreme^{SL} (3rd)	Chonburi	Supreme Distribution
Khonkaenstar (5th)	Khon Kaen	Toyota Kaennakorn Co., LTD.
Nakhon Ratchasima^{TH} (2nd)	Nakhon Ratchasima	Sport Association of Nakhon Ratchasima Province
Nakornnonthaburi (4th)	Nonthaburi	Nakornnonthaburi XI Sports School, Nonthaburi City Municipality
Diamond Food (1st)	Samut Sakhon	Diamond Food Product

Pro Challenge
Team	Province	Affiliated
Black power Udonthani	Udonthani	Sensei Sport ware, Shabu Nayai, Wanwan 90
Kasetsart university	Pathum Thani	Kasetsart University, Bangkok Metropolitan Administration
Suan Kulab Non VC	Nonthaburi	Suakalab Nonthaburi Sport School
Supanburi VC	Suphan Buri	Supanburi Sport School
Rajamonkon Thanyaburi VC	Pathum Thani	Rajamangala University of Technology Thanyaburi

=== Personnel and kits ===
Team	Round	Manager	Coach	Captain	Kit manufacturer	Kit sponsors
Black power Udonthani	Pro Challenge	(Thailand) Nariwat Promjinda	(Thailand) Norrachot Taweewitchakreeya	(Thailand) Chompoonuch Jitsabay	Sensei	Sensei Sport waer, Shabu Nayai, Wanwan 90
Black power Udonthani	Regular	(Thailand)	(Thailand)	(Thailand)	Sensei	
Diamond Food	Regular	(Thailand) Orawan Panthong	(Thailand) Kittikun Sriutthawong	(Thailand) Onuma Sittirak	Grand Sport	Diamond Food, Fine Chef
Khonkaen Star	Regular	(Thailand) Panya Pollayut	(Thailand) Apirat Ngammeerit	(Thailand)	Ocel	Thai-Denmark, Toyota Kaennakorn Co., LTD., North Eastern University, M-Society Fitness Khonkaen, Khon Kaen City Development (KKTT) Co., LTD., Ocel Sport
Rajamonkon Thanyaburi VC	Pro Challenge	(Thailand) Benjawan Saruekan	(Thailand) Matao Sulong	(Thailand) Cholpassorn Kittithornteerana	Grand Sport	Rajamangala University of Technology Thanyaburi
Suan Kulab Non VC	Pro Challenge	(Thailand) Thitinop Panangwichian	(Thailand) Suthep Tongsri	(Thailand) Pinyada Thopo	Kela	Suakalab Nonthaburi Sport School
Supanburi VC	Pro Challenge	(Thailand) Teerapon Nootha	(Thailand) Aekkachai Pansorndee	(Thailand) Vatanya Pimsana	Sensei	Supanburi Sport School, Supanburi Metropolitan Administration
Nakhon Ratchasima	Regular	(Thailand) Thawatchai Yuenyong	(Thailand) Padejsuk Wannachote	(Thailand)	FBT	The Mall, CP, 7-Eleven, Kubota, Thai lottery, Koh-Kae, Vana Nava, Adda
Nakornnonthaburi	Regular	(Thailand) Parawee Hoisang	(Thailand) Thanakit Inleang	(Thailand)	Grand Sport	3BB Internet
Proflex	Regular	(Thailand)	(Thailand)	(Thailand)	Kela	Proflex, Thai AirAsia, Gulf Energy, Salming, Mybacin
Kasetsart University	Pro Challenge	(Thailand) Yutthachai Rattanawongrak	(Thailand) Apichart Kongsawat	(Thailand) Aorasa Pinitduang	Grand Sport	Aetrex Worldwide, Inc., Kasetsart University
Kasetsart University	Regular	(Thailand) Yutthachai Rattanawongrak	(Thailand)	(Thailand)	Grand Sport	Aetrex Worldwide, Inc., Kasetsart University
Supreme	Regular	(Thailand) Thanadit Prasopnet	(Thailand) Nataphon Srisamutnak	(Thailand) Pleumjit Thinkaow	Mizuno	Supreme, Brother, Samsung Knox, Acer, Jetts Fitness, VSTECS, Synnex, drinkHooray, LG, Veritas

== Squads ==
=== National team players ===
- Players name in **bold** indicates the player is registered during the mid-season transfer window.

=== Foreign players ===
- Players name in **bold** indicates the player is registered during the mid-season transfer window.

Team	Player 1	Player 2	Player 3
Nakhon Ratchasima	(Philippines) Mylene Paat	(Philippines) **Dindin Santiago**	
Diamond Food	(Brazil) Fernanda Davis Tomé	(Cuba) Liannes Castañeda Simon	

- Withdraws

=== Transfers ===
==== Second leg ====
Name	Moving from	Moving to
(Thailand) Nootsara Tomkom	Free agent	(Thailand) Diamond Food
(Philippines) Dindin Santiago	(Philippines) Chery Tiggo 7 Pro Crossovers	(Thailand) Nakhon Ratchasima

== Format ==
Regular seasons

- First leg (Week 1–6): single round-robin; The seventh place and eighth place will relegate to Pro League.
- **Second leg: (Week 7–13)** single round-robin; The top four will advance to Final series.

Final series

- First leg (Week 14): single round-robin.
- **Second leg: (Week 15)** single round-robin.

=== Standing procedure ===
1. Number of matches won
2. Match points
3. Sets ratio
4. Points ratio
5. Result of the last match between the tied teams

Match won 3–0 or 3–1: 3 match points for the winner, 0 match points for the loser
Match won 3–2: 2 match points for the winner, 1 match point for the loser

== Regular seasons – First leg ==
=== First leg table ===
Pos	Team	Pld	W	L	Pts	SW	SL	SR	SPW	SPL	SPR	Qualification
1	Supreme Chonburi	7	7	0	21	18	5	3.600	538	407	1.322	Second leg
2	Diamond Food	7	6	1	18	18	1	18.000	549	348	1.578	Second leg
3	Nakhon Ratchasima The Mall	7	4	3	12	15	10	1.500	587	528	1.112	Second leg
4	3BB Nakornnont	7	4	3	12	13	11	1.182	516	472	1.093	Second leg
5	Khonkaen Star	7	4	3	12	12	13	0.923	542	541	1.002	Second leg
6	Proflex	7	2	5	6	10	16	0.625	516	588	0.878	Second leg
7	Kasetsart University	7	1	6	3	5	20	0.250	439	590	0.744	Relegation to Pro League
8	Black Power Udonthani	7	0	7	0	3	21	0.143	359	572	0.628	Relegation to Pro League

=== Positions by round ===
Leader
Relegation to Pro Challenge

Team ╲ Round	1	2	3	4	5	6	7
Khonkaen Star	4	3	4	4	4	5	5
Diamond Food	1	4	2	2	2	2	2
Generali Supreme Chonburi	3	1	1	1	1	1	1
Nakhon Ratchasima The Mall	5	7	6	6	5	4	3
Kasetsart	8	5	7	7	7	7	7
Black Power Udonthani	7	8	8	8	8	8	8
3BB Nakornnont	2	2	3	3	3	3	4
Proflex	6	6	5	5	6	6	6

=== Week 1 ===
- Venue: MCC Hall The Mall Ngamwongwan, Nonthaburi
- Dates: 08–9 December 2021

Date	Time		Score		Set 1	Set 2	Set 3	Set 4	Set 5	Total	Report
8 Dec	16:00	**Supreme Chonburi**	**3–0**	Black Power	25–13	25–11	25–9			**75–33**	P2
8 Dec	19:00	Nakhon Ratchasima The Mall	**1–3**	**Diamond Food**	24–26	25–23	23–25	15–25		**87–99**	P2
9 Dec	16:00	**3BB Nakornnont**	**3–0**	Kasetsart	25–15	25–16	25–13			**75–44**	P2
9 Dec	19:00	Proflex	**1–3**	**Khonkaen Star**	25–23	17–25	22–25	13–25		**77–98**	P2

=== Week 2 ===
- Venue: MCC Hall The Mall Ngamwongwan, Nonthaburi
- Dates: 22–23 December 2021

Date	Time		Score		Set 1	Set 2	Set 3	Set 4	Set 5	Total	Report
22 Dec	9:30	Black Power	**2–3**	**Kasetsart**	19–25	25–20	25–14	12–25	10–15	**91–99**	P2
22 Dec	15:30	Diamond Food	**0–3**	**Supreme Chonburi**	18–25	20–25	12–25			**50–75**	P2
23 Dec	15:30	Nakhon Ratchasima The Mall	**1–3**	**Khonkaen Star**	26–24	21–25	21–25	20–25		**88–99**	P2
23 Dec	18:30	**3BB Nakornnont**	**3–2**	Proflex	25–14	20–25	23–25	25–12	15–10	**108–86**	P2

=== Week 3 ===
- Venue: MCC Hall The Mall Ngamwongwan, Nonthaburi
- Dates: 28–29 December 2021

Date	Time		Score		Set 1	Set 2	Set 3	Set 4	Set 5	Total	Report
28 Dec	18:30	**Diamond Food**	**3–0**	Khonkaen Star	25–16	25–18	25–12			**75–46**	P2
28 Dec	9:30	**Supreme Chonburi**	**3–0**	Kasetsart	25–13	25–13	25–11			**75–37**	P2
29 Dec	15:30	**Nakhon Ratchasima The Mall**	**3–1**	3BB Nakornnont	26–24	25–21	20–25	25–18		**96–88**	P2
29 Dec	15:30	Black Power	**0–3**	**Proflex**	15–25	22–25	16–25			**53–75**	P2

=== Week 4 ===
- Venue: Nimibutr Stadium, Bangkok
- Dates: 08–9 January 2022

Date	Time		Score		Set 1	Set 2	Set 3	Set 4	Set 5	Total	Report
08 Jan	10:00	Kasetsart	**1–3**	**Proflex**	25–23	21–25	23–25	20–25		**89–98**	P2
08 Jan	19:00	Khonkaen Star	**0–3**	**Supreme Chonburi**	15–25	19–25	13–25			**47–75**	P2
09 Jan	14:45	**Diamond Food**	**3–0**	3BB Nakornnont	25–13	25–12	25–14			**75–39**	P2
09 Jan	17:45	Black Power	**0–3**	**Nakhon Ratchasima The Mall**	5–25	17–25	11–25			**33–75**	P2

=== Week 5 ===
- Venue: Nimibutr Stadium, Bangkok
- Dates: 12–13 January 2022

Date	Time		Score		Set 1	Set 2	Set 3	Set 4	Set 5	Total	Report
12 Jan	09:30	**3BB Nakornnont**	**3–0**	Black Power	25–13	25–12	25–16			**75–41**	P2
12 Jan	15:30	**Supreme Chonburi**	**3–1**	Nakhon Ratchasima The Mall	19–25	29–27	25–14	25–23		**98–89**	P2
13 Jan	09:30	Proflex	**0–3**	**Diamond Food**	15–25	18–25	13–25			**46–75**	P2
13 Jan	18:30	**Khonkaen Star**	**3–1**	Kasetsart	25–21	25–16	26–28	25–21		**101–86**	P2

=== Week 6 ===
- Venue: Nimibutr Stadium, Bangkok
- Dates: 15–16 January 2022

Date	Time		Score		Set 1	Set 2	Set 3	Set 4	Set 5	Total	Report
15 Jan	15:30	**Supreme Chonburi**	**3–1**	Proflex	25–24	13–25	25–10	25–11		**88–70**	P2
15 Jan	18:30	Khonkaen Star	**0–3**	**3BB Nakornnont**	14–25	23–25	16–25			**53–75**	P2
16 Jan	14:45	Kasetsart	**0–3**	**Nakhon Ratchasima The Mall**	15–25	17–25	15–25			**47–75**	P2
16 Jan	17:45	**Diamond Food**	**3–0**	Black Power	25–16	25–15	25–12			**75–43**	P2

=== Week 7 ===
- Venue: Nimibutr Stadium, Bangkok
- Dates: 22–23 January 2022

Date	Time		Score		Set 1	Set 2	Set 3	Set 4	Set 5	Total	Report
22 Jan	9:30	Proflex	**0–3**	**Nakhon Ratchasima The Mall**	21–25	18–25	25–27			**64–77**	P2
22 Jan	18:30	3BB Nakornnont	**0–3**	**Supreme Chonburi**	25–27	17–25	14–25			**56–77**	P2
23 Jan	14:45	**Khonkaen Star**	**3–1**	Black Power	25–20	25–12	23–25	25–8		**98–65**	P2
23 Jan	17:45	Kasetsart	**0–3**	**Diamond Food**	14–25	9–25	14–25			**37–75**	P2

== Regular seasons – Second leg ==
=== Second leg table ===
Pos	Team	Pld	W	L	Pts	SW	SL	SR	SPW	SPL	SPR	Qualification
1	Supreme Chonburi	5	5	0	15	15	3	5.000	442	330	1.339	Final series
2	Diamond Food	5	4	1	12	13	3	4.333	378	312	1.212	Final series
3	Khonkaen Star	5	2	3	6	11	9	1.222	414	426	0.972	Final series
4	Nakhon Ratchasima The Mall	5	2	3	6	6	9	0.667	260	334	0.778	Final series
5	3BB Nakornnont	5	2	3	6	6	12	0.500	350	394	0.888	Not passed into Final series
6	Proflex	5	0	5	0	4	15	0.267	354	438	0.808	Not passed into Final series

=== Positions by round ===
Leader
Not pass to Final 4

Team ╲ Round	1	2	3	4	5
Khonkaen Star	2	2	3	3	3
Generali Supreme Chonburi	3	1	2	1	1
Diamond Food	1	3	1	2	2
Nakhon Ratchasima The Mall	5	4	4	4	4
3BB Nakornnont	6	6	6	5	5
Proflex	4	5	5	6	6

=== Week 8 ===
- Venue: Nimibutr Stadium, Bangkok
- Dates: 29–30 January 2022

Date	Time		Score		Set 1	Set 2	Set 3	Set 4	Set 5	Total	Report
29 Jan	18.00	Nakhon Ratchasima The Mall	**0–3**	**Khonkaen Star**	19–25	18–25	23–25			**60–75**	P2
29 Jan	14.45	**Diamond Food**	**3–0**	3BB Nakornnont	25–17	25–16	25–20			**75–53**	P2
30 Jan	18.00	**Supreme Chonburi**	**3–1**	Proflex	25–14	27–25	21–25	25–15		**98–79**	P2

=== Week 9 ===
- Venue: Nimibutr Stadium, Bangkok
- Dates: 2 February 2022

Date	Time		Score		Set 1	Set 2	Set 3	Set 4	Set 5	Total	Report
02 Feb	15.30	3BB Nakornnont	**0–3**	**Supreme Chonburi**	19–25	14–25	20–25			**53–75**	P2
02 Jan	18.30	Proflex	**2–3**	**Khonkaen Star**	25–22	19–25	26–24	17–25	9–15	**96–111**	P2

=== Week 10 ===
- Venue: Nimibutr Stadium, Bangkok
- Dates: 05–9 February 2022

Date	Time		Score		Set 1	Set 2	Set 3	Set 4	Set 5	Total	Report
05 Feb	18.00	Proflex	**0–3**	**Diamond Food**	15–25	17–25	17–25			**49–75**	P2
06 Feb	11.30	3BB Nakornnont	**0–3**	**Nakhon Ratchasima The Mall**	17–25	15–25	22–25			**54–75**	P2
06 Feb	18.00	**Supreme Chonburi**	**3–1**	Khonkaen Star	25–21	25–15	23–25	25–10		**98–71**	P2
09 Feb	18.00	Nakhon Ratchasima The Mall	**0–3**	**Diamond Food**	17–25	19–25	15–25			**51–75**	P2

=== Week 11 ===
- Venue: Nimibutr Stadium, Bangkok
- Dates: 12–13 February 2022

Date	Time		Score		Set 1	Set 2	Set 3	Set 4	Set 5	Total	Report
12 Feb	14.45	Khonkaen Star	**2–3**	**3BB Nakornnont**	25–19	20–25	13–25	25–13	11–15	**94–97**	P2
12 Feb	18.00	**Nakhon Ratchasima The Mall**	**3–0**	Proflex	25–16	25–23	25–16			**75–55**	P2
13 Feb	18.00	**Supreme Chonburi**	**3–1**	Diamond Food	21–25	25–15	25–22	25–16		**96–78**	P2

=== Week 12 ===
- Venue: Nimibutr Stadium, Bangkok
- Dates: 19–20 February 2022

Date	Time		Score		Set 1	Set 2	Set 3	Set 4	Set 5	Total	Report
19 Feb	17.00	Proflex	**1–3**	**3BB Nakornnont**	25–18	12–25	16–25	22–25		**75–93**	P2
20 Feb	13.30	**Diamond Food**	**3–0**	Khonkaen Star	25–22	25–20	25–21			**75–63**	P2
20 Feb	17.00	**Supreme Chonburi**	**3–0**	Nakhon Ratchasima The Mall	25–11	25–21	25–17			**75–49**	P2

== Final series ==
=== Final series table ===
Pos	Team	Pld	W	L	Pts	SW	SL	SR	SPW	SPL	SPR	Final result
1	Supreme Chonburi	3	**3**	0	9	9	2	4.500	249	200	1.245	Champions
2	Diamond Food	3	**2**	1	6	8	4	2.000	371	242	1.533	Runners-up
3	Nakhon Ratchasima The Mall	3	**1**	2	3	4	6	0.667	205	229	0.895	Third Place
4	Khonkaen Star	3	**0**	3	0	0	6	0.000	171	225	0.760	Fourth Place

=== Week 13 ===
- Venue: MCC Hall The Mall Bangkapi, Bangkok
- Dates: 25–27 February 2022

Date	Time		Score		Set 1	Set 2	Set 3	Set 4	Set 5	Total	Report
25 Feb	14.45	**Supreme Chonburi**	3–0	Khonkaen Star	25–14	25–18	25–20			75–52	P2
25 Feb	18.00	Nakhon Ratchasima The Mall	1–3	**Diamond Food**	16–25	25–16	15–25	27–29		83–95	P2
26 Feb	14.45	**Supreme Chonburi**	3–0	Nakhon Ratchasima The Mall	25–12	25–15	25–20			75–47	P2
26 Feb	18.00	**Diamond Food**	3–0	Khonkaen Star	25–17	25–20	25–23			75–60	P2
27 Feb	11.45	**Nakhon Ratchasima The Mall**	3–0	Khonkaen Star	25–23	25–17	25–18			75–58	
27 Feb	18.00	**Supreme Chonburi**	3–2	Diamond Food	16–25	25–23	18–25	25–20	15–8	99–101	
