= 2020–21 Women's Volleyball Thailand League =

2021 Women's Volleyball Thailand League
- Dates: 12 November 2020 – 28 March 2021
- Teams: 8
- Venue: (in 2 host cities)

Final positions
- Champions: Diamond Food (1st title)
- Runners-up: Nakhon Ratchasima
- Third place: Supreme Chonburi
- Fourth place: 3BB Nakornnont

Tournament awards
- MVP: (Thailand) Onuma Sittirak (Diamond Food)

Tournament statistics
- Matches played: 56 (Regular seasons); 4 (Final series)

The 2020–21 Women's Volleyball Thailand League is the 16th season of the Women's Volleyball Thailand League, the top Thai professional league for women's volleyball clubs, since its establishment in 2005, also known as Daikin Women's Volleyball Thailand League due to the sponsorship deal with Daikin. A total of 8 teams will compete in the league. The season will begin on 12 November 2020 and is scheduled to conclude in 2021. This season will be organized by the Thailand Volleyball Association (TVA) instead of Thailand Volleyball Co., Ltd. The season started.

== Teams ==
Eight teams compete in the league – the top six teams from the previous season and the two teams promoted from the Pro Challenge. The promoted teams are Samut Prakan VC and Rangsit University. Rangsit University retains its position after relegation in previous season, while Samut Prakan VC reaches a top division for the first time. Samut Prakan VC replaced Opart 369 (relegated after four years in the top division) and this is the comeback of Samut Prakan VC for 7 years before play in Thailand league.

=== Qualified teams ===
League positions of the previous season shown in parentheses (TH: Thailand League title holders; SL: Super League title holders).

Qualified teams for 2019–20 Volleyball Thailand League (by entry round) Regular seasons
Team	Province	Affiliated
Proflex (6th)	Bangkok	Power Cooperation
Supreme^{SL} (1st)	Chonburi	Supreme Distribution
Khonkaenstar (2nd)	Khon Kaen	Toyota Kaennakorn Co., LTD.
Nakhon Ratchasima^{TH} (3rd)	Nakhon Ratchasima	Sport Association of Nakhon Ratchasima Province
Nakornnonthaburi (4th)	Nonthaburi	Nakornnonthaburi XI Sports School, Nonthaburi City Municipality
Diamond Food (5th)	Samut Sakhon	Diamond Food Product

Pro Challenge
Team	Province	Affiliated
Samut Prakan VC	Bangkok	Samut Prakan Sport School, Bangkok Metropolitan Administration
Rangsit University	Pathum Thani	Rangsit University
Metro TNSU Chonburi VC	Chonburi	Chonburi Rungkitt Commercial College

=== Personnel and kits ===
Team	Round	Manager	Coach	Captain	Kit manufacturer	Kit sponsors
Samut Prakan VC	Pro Challenge	(Thailand) Peerpat Tanit	(Thailand) Satian Sarathinghon	(Thailand) Preechaya Insriri	Grand Sport	Samut Prakan
Samut Prakan VC	Regular	(Thailand) Peerpat Tanit	(Thailand) Satian Sarathinghon	(Thailand) Preechaya Insriri	Grand Sport	Samut Prakan
Diamond Food	Regular	(Thailand) Orawan Panthong	(Thailand) Danai Sriwatcharamethakul	(Thailand) Onuma Sittirak	Grand Sport	Diamond Food, Fine Chef
Khonkaen Star	Regular	(Thailand) Panya Pollayut	(Thailand) Apirat Ngammeerit	(Thailand) Tapaphaipun Chaisri	Ocel	Thai-Denmark, Toyota Kaennakorn Co., LTD., North Eastern University, M-Society Fitness Khonkaen, Khon Kaen City Development (KKTT) Co., LTD., Ocel Sport
Metro TNSU Chonburi VC	Pro Challenge	(Thailand) Nuchada	(Thailand) Jeerawat Kajornsin	(Thailand) Hannah Papps	FBT	MetroTNSU Chonburi
Nakhon Ratchasima	Regular	(Thailand) Thawatchai Yuenyong	(Thailand) Padejsuk Wannachote	(Thailand) Chatchu-on Moksri	FBT	The Mall, CP, 7-Eleven, Kubota, Thai lottery, Koh-Kae, Vana Nava, Adda
Nakornnonthaburi	Regular	(Thailand) Parawee Hoisang	(Thailand) Thanakit Inleang	(Thailand) Kuttika Kaewpin	Grand Sport	3BB Internet
Proflex	Regular	(Thailand) Pattana Thepmalapunsriri	(Thailand) Phataranat Deema	(Thailand) Prapatsorn Kongudom	Kela	Proflex, Thai AirAsia, Gulf Energy, Salming, Mybacin
Rangsit University	Pro Challenge	(Thailand) Chanchai Suksuvan	(Thailand) Suwat Jeerapan	(Thailand) Sutthina Pasang	Kela	Est Cola
Rangsit University	Regular	(Thailand) Chanchai Suksuvan	(Thailand) Suwat Jeerapan	(Thailand) Sutthina Pasang	Kela	Rangsit University, Thai AirAsia, Mybacin, Gulf Energy, Bangchak
Supreme	Regular	(Thailand) Thanadit Prasopnet	(Thailand) Nataphon Srisamutnak	(Thailand) Wilavan Apinyapong	Mizuno	Supreme, Brother, Samsung Knox, Acer, Jetts Fitness, VSTECS, Synnex, drinkHooray, LG, Veritas

== Squads ==
=== National team players ===
- Players name in **bold** indicates the player is registered during the mid-season transfer window.

Team	Player 1	Player 2	Player 3	Free player 1	Free player 2	Free player 2
Diamond Food	Onuma Sittirak	Malika Kanthong	**Nootsara Tomkom**	Tikamporn Changkeaw		
Khonkaenstar	Kaewkalaya Kamulthala					
Nakhon Ratchasima	Chatchu-on Moksri	Yupa Sanitklang	Chitaporn Kamlangmak	Natthanicha Jaisaen		
Nakornnonthaburi	Pimpichaya Kokram	Tichaya Boonlert		Kuttika Kaewpin	Jidapa Nahuanong	
Supreme	Pleumjit Thinkaow	Wilavan Apinyapong	Ajcharaporn Kongyot	Supattra Pairoj	Wipawee Srithong	Watchareeya Nuanjam

=== Foreign players ===
- Players name in **bold** indicates the player is registered during the mid-season transfer window.

Team	Player 1	Player 2	Player 3
Nakhon Ratchasima	(Turkey) Yeliz Başa		
3BB Nakhornnont	(Russia) Nizeva Evgeniia *		
Supreme Chonburi	(Indonesia) **Megawati Hangestri Pertiwi**		
Diamond Food	(Cuba) **Yusleinis Herrera** *		

- Withdraws

=== Transfers ===
==== Second leg ====
Name	Moving from	Moving to
(Thailand) Nootsara Tomkom	Free agent	(Thailand) Diamond Food
(Thailand) Samutchaya Lungbubpha	(Thailand) Rangsit University	(Thailand) Proflex
(Thailand) Jurarak Nuanboriboon	(Thailand) Rangsit University	(Thailand) Proflex
(Thailand) Suthina Pasang	(Thailand) Rangsit University	(Thailand) Proflex
(Thailand) Warisa Yimyai	(Thailand) Rangsit University	(Thailand) Proflex
(Thailand) Kelwalin Suwannapong	(Thailand) Rangsit University	(Thailand) Proflex
(Thailand) Natthimar Kubkaew	(Thailand) Proflex	(Thailand) Supreme Chonburi
(Thailand) Waranya Srila-ong	Free agent	(Thailand) Supreme Chonburi
(Indonesia) Megawati Hangestri Pertiwi	(Indonesia) Jakarta BNI46	(Thailand) Supreme Chonburi
(Cuba) Yusleinis Herrera	(Turkey) Sigorta Shop Kalecik Belediye	(Thailand) Diamond Food

== Schedule ==
Stage	Week	Days	Venue
First leg	1	12–13 December 2020	Nimitbut Sport Center, Bangkok
First leg	2	19–20 December 2020	Nimitbut Sport Center, Bangkok
First leg	3	26–27 December 2020	Nimitbut Sport Center, Bangkok
First leg	4	13–14 February 2021	Nimitbut Sport Center, Bangkok
First leg	5	17 February 2021,20–21 February 2021	Nimitbut Sport Center, Bangkok
First leg	6	24 February 2021,27–28 February 2021	Nimitbut Sport Center, Bangkok
Second leg	7	6–7 March 2021	Nimitbut Sport Center, Bangkok
Second leg	8	10 March 2021,13–14 March 2021	Nimitbut Sport Center, Bangkok
Second leg	9	17 March 2021,20–21 March 2021	Nimitbut Sport Center, Bangkok
Second leg	10	27–28 March 2021	MCC Hall The Mall Bangkapi, Bangkok
Final Series
Final Series	11	2–4 April 2021	MCC Hall The Mall Bangkapi, Bangkok
Final Series	12	9–11 April 2021	MCC Hall The Mall Bangkapi, Bangkok

== Format ==
Regular seasons

- First leg (Week 1–6): single round-robin; The seventh place and eighth place will relegate to Pro League.
- Second leg: (Week 7–13) single round-robin; The top four will advance to Final series.

Final series

- First leg (Week 14): single round-robin.
- Second leg: (Week 15) single round-robin.

=== Standing procedure ===
1. Number of matches won
2. Match points
3. Sets ratio
4. Points ratio
5. Result of the last match between the tied teams

Match won 3–0 or 3–1: 3 match points for the winner, 0 match points for the loser
Match won 3–2: 2 match points for the winner, 1 match point for the loser

== Regular seasons – First leg ==
=== First leg table ===
Pos	Team	Pld	W	L	Pts	SW	SL	SR	SPW	SPL	SPR	Qualification
1	Supreme Chonburi	7	6	1	19	20	4	5.000	578	439	1.317	Second leg
2	Nakhon Ratchasima The Mall	7	6	1	17	19	6	3.167	593	464	1.278	Second leg
3	Diamond Food	7	5	2	15	17	10	1.700	605	520	1.163	Second leg
4	Khonkaen Star	7	4	3	12	14	9	1.556	504	473	1.066	Second leg
5	3BB Nakornnont	7	4	3	12	14	11	1.273	541	485	1.115	Second leg
6	Proflex	7	2	5	5	6	18	0.333	474	565	0.839	Second leg
7	Rangsit University	7	1	6	4	6	19	0.316	435	579	0.751	Relegation to Pro League
8	Samut Prakan VC	7	0	7	0	2	21	0.095	371	576	0.644	Relegation to Pro League

=== Positions by round ===
Leader
Relegation to Pro Challenge

Team ╲ Round	1	2	3	4	5	6
Khonkaen Star	4	1	3	2	2	4
Generali Supreme Chonburi	2	2	1	1	1	1
Diamond Food	3	3	2	4	3	3
Nakhon Ratchasima The Mall	1	4	4	3	4	2
Rangsit University	8	7	7	7	7	7
Samut Prakan VC	7	8	8	8	8	8
3BB Nakornnont	5	5	5	5	5	5
Proflex	6	6	6	6	6	6

=== Week 1 ===
- Venue: Nimitbut Sport Center, Bangkok
- Dates: 12–13 December 2020

Date	Time		Score		Set 1	Set 2	Set 3	Set 4	Set 5	Total	Report
12 Dec	12:00	Generali Supreme Chonburi	3–0	Samut Prakan VC	25–16	25–10	25–13			75–39	
12 Dec	18:00	3BB Nakornnont	0–3	Khonkaen Star	17–25	19–25	22–25			58–75	
13 Dec	12:00	Rangsit University	0–3	Nakhon Ratchasima The Mall	11–25	9–25	15–25			35–75	
13 Dec	18:00	Proflex	0–3	Diamond Food	14–25	18–25	18–25			50–75	

=== Week 2 ===
- Venue: Nimitbut Sport Center, Bangkok
- Dates: 19–20 December 2020

Date	Time		Score		Set 1	Set 2	Set 3	Set 4	Set 5	Total	Report
19 Dec	12:00	Generali Supreme Chonburi	3–1	Nakhon Ratchasima The Mall	25–23	23–25	25–20	25–18		98–86	
19 Dec	18:00	Proflex	3–2	Rangsit University	25–21	23–25	25–19	22–25	15–10	110–100	
20 Dec	15:00	3BB Nakornnont	3–2	Diamond Food	16–25	25–14	25–17	21–25	15–12	102–93	
20 Dec	18:00	Samut Prakan VC	0–3	Khonkaen Star	15–25	14–25	18–25			47–75	

=== Week 3 ===
- Venue: Nimitbut Sport Center, Bangkok
- Dates: 26–27 December 2020

Date	Time		Score		Set 1	Set 2	Set 3	Set 4	Set 5	Total	Report
26 Dec	12:00	Rangsit University	1–3	Diamond Food	25–23	13–25	10–25	17–25		65–98	
26 Dec	18:00	Khonkaen Star	1–3	Nakhon Ratchasima The Mall	16–25	19–25	25–21	10–25		70–96	
27 Dec	12:00	Proflex	0–3	Generali Supreme Chonburi	15–25	25–27	15–25			55–77	
27 Dec	18:00	Samut Prakan VC	0–3	3BB Nakornnont	10–25	15–25	13–25			38–75	

=== Week 4 ===
- Sliding of the competition because Outbreak of coronavirus in Thailand
- Venue: MCC Hall The Mall Ngamwongwan, Nonthaburi
- Dates: 13–14 February 2021

Date	Time		Score		Set 1	Set 2	Set 3	Set 4	Set 5	Total	Report
13 Feb*	12:00	Samut Prakan VC	0–3	Nakhon Ratchasima The Mall	9–25	12–25	18–25			39–75	
13 Feb*	18:00	Generali Supreme Chonburi	2–3	Diamond Food	25–22	21–25	25–17	20–25	12–15	103–104	
14 Feb*	09:00	Proflex	0–3	Khonkaen Star	20–25	16–25	18–25			54–75	
14 Feb*	18:00	Rangsit University	0–3	3BB Nakornnont	12–25	12–25	12–25			36–75	

=== Week 5 ===
- Venue: MCC Hall The Mall Ngamwongwan, Nonthaburi
- Dates: 20–21 February 2021

Date	Time		Score		Set 1	Set 2	Set 3	Set 4	Set 5	Total	Report
17 Feb	12:00	Rangsit University	0–3	Khonkaen Star	14–25	11–25	21–25			46–75	
17 Feb	18:00	Generali Supreme Chonburi	3–0	3BB Nakornnont	25–19	25–15	25–17			75–51	
20 Feb	12:00	Nakhon Ratchasima The Mall	3–2	3BB Nakornnont	25–20	25–27	21–25	25–20	15–13	111–105	
20 Feb	18:00	Rangsit University	0–3	Generali Supreme Chonburi	16–25	16–25	19–25			51–75	
21 Feb	15:00	Diamond Food	3–1	Khonkaen Star	25–21	25–18	22–25	25–17		97–81	
21 Feb	18:00	Proflex	3–1	Samut Prakan VC	25–20	25–22	24–26	25–20		99–88	

=== Week 6 ===
- Venue: MCC Hall The Mall Ngamwongwan, Nonthaburi
- Dates: 24,27–28 February 2021

Date	Time		Score		Set 1	Set 2	Set 3	Set 4	Set 5	Total	Report
24 Feb	12:00	Diamond Food	3–0	Samut Prakan VC	25–12	25–14	25–18			75–44	
24 Feb	18:00	Nakhon Ratchasima The Mall	3–0	Proflex	25–18	25–22	25–14			75–54	
27 Feb	12:00	3BB Nakornnont	3–0	Proflex	25–12	25–18	25–22			75–52	
27 Feb	18:00	Nakhon Ratchasima The Mall	3–0	Diamond Food	25–23	25–18	25–23			75–64	
28 Feb	15:00	Rangsit University	3–1	Samut Prakan VC	25–9	27–29	25–18	25–16		102–72	
28 Feb	18:00	Generali Supreme Chonburi	3–0	Khonkaen Star	25–21	25–17	25–16			75–54	

== Regular seasons – Second leg ==
=== Second leg table ===
Pos	Team	Pld	W	L	Pts	SW	SL	SR	SPW	SPL	SPR	Qualification
1	Diamond Food	5	5	0	15	15	3	5.000	350	273	1.282	Final series
2	Nakhon Ratchasima The Mall	5	4	1	12	13	4	3.250	321	216	1.486	Final series
3	Supreme Chonburi	5	3	2	9	11	7	1.571	315	289	1.090	Final series
4	3BB Nakornnont	5	2	3	6	8	10	0.800	211	238	0.887	Final series
5	Khonkaen Star	5	1	4	2	3	14	0.214	208	300	0.693	Not passed into Final series
6	Proflex	5	0	5	1	3	15	0.200	136	225	0.604	Not passed into Final series

=== Positions by round ===
Leader
Not pass to Final 4

Team ╲ Round	1	2	3	4
Khonkaen Star	6	5	6	5
Generali Supreme Chonburi	4	3	3	3
Diamond Food	1	2	2	1
Nakhon Ratchasima The Mall	3	1	1	2
3BB Nakornnont	2	4	4	4
Proflex	5	6	5	6

=== Week 7 ===
- Venue: Nimitbut Sport Center, Bangkok
- Dates: 6–7 March 2021

Date	Time		Score		Set 1	Set 2	Set 3	Set 4	Set 5	Total	Report
6 Mar	12.00	Diamond Food	3–0	Proflex	25–18	25–16	25–12			75–46	
6 Mar	15.00	Supreme Chonburi	1–3	Nakhon Ratchasima The Mall	25–21	17–25	16–25	20–25		78–96	
7 Mar	18.00	Khonkaen Star	0–3	3BB Nakornnont	22–25	20–25	19–25			61–75	

=== Week 8 ===
- Venue: Nimitbut Sport Center, Bangkok
- Dates: 10,13–14 March 2021

Date	Time		Score		Set 1	Set 2	Set 3	Set 4	Set 5	Total	Report
10 Mar	12.00	Khonkaen Star	0–3	Diamond Food	15–25	21–25	21–25			57–75	
10 Mar	15.00	Nakhon Ratchasima The Mall	3–0	3BB Nakornnont	25–16	25–21	25–16			75–53	
13 Mar	18.00	Supreme Chonburi	3–0	Khonkaen Star	25–13	25–13	25–21			75–47	
14 Mar	12.00	Proflex	0–3	Nakhon Ratchasima The Mall	19–25	11–25	12–25			42–75	
14 Mar	15.00	Diamond Food	3–1	3BB Nakornnont	27–29	25–15	25–19	25–20		102–83	

=== Week 9 ===
- Venue: Nimitbut Sport Center, Bangkok
- Dates: 17,20–21 March 2021

Date	Time		Score		Set 1	Set 2	Set 3	Set 4	Set 5	Total	Report
17 Mar	18.00	Supreme Chonburi	3–0	Proflex	25–11	25–22	25–15			75–48	
20 Mar	12.00	Nakhon Ratchasima The Mall	3–0	Khonkaen Star	25–15	25–11	25–17			75–43	
20 Mar	15.00	Supreme Chonburi	1–3	Diamond Food	19–25	21–25	25–23	22–25		87–98	
21 Mar	18.00	3BB Nakornnont	3–1	Proflex	25–21	25–23	22–25	25–19		97–88	

=== Week 10 ===
- Venue: MCC Hall The Mall Bangkapi, Bangkok
- Dates: 27–28 March 2021

Date	Time		Score		Set 1	Set 2	Set 3	Set 4	Set 5	Total	Report
27 Mar	12.00	Supreme Chonburi	3–1	3BB Nakornnont	25–14	22–25	25–12	25–12		97–63	
27 Mar	15.00	Proflex	2–3	Khonkaen Star	28–26	15–25	25–20	19–25	12–15	99–111	
28 Mar	18.00	Nakhon Ratchasima The Mall	1–3	Diamond Food	25–27	12–25	25–23	16–25		78–100	

== Final series ==
=== Final series table ===
Pos	Team	Pld	W	L	Pts	SW	SL	SR	SPW	SPL	SPR	Final result
1	Diamond Food	6	6	0	17	18	4	4.500	333	239	1.393	Champions
2	Nakhon Ratchasima The Mall	6	4	2	11	13	9	1.444	216	216	1.000	Runners-up
3	Supreme Chonburi	6	2	4	8	11	13	0.846	237	235	1.009	Third Place
4	3BB Nakornnont	6	0	6	0	2	18	0.111	225	321	0.701	Fourth Place

=== Week 11 ===
- Venue: MCC Hall The Mall Bangkapi, Bangkok
- Dates: 2–4 April 2021

Date	Time		Score		Set 1	Set 2	Set 3	Set 4	Set 5	Total	Report
2 Apr	12.00	Diamond Food	3–0	3BB Nakornnont	25–13	25–16	25–18			75–47	
2 Apr	15.00	Nakhon Ratchasima The Mall	3–0	Supreme Chonburi	25–23	25–20	25–20			75–63	
3 Apr	09.00	Supreme Chonburi	2–3	Diamond Food	25–22	16–25	18–25	25–19	15–17	99–108	
3 Apr	18.00	3BB Nakornnont	1–3	Nakhon Ratchasima The Mall	17–25	25–21	15–25	21–25		78–96	
4 Apr	12.00	Diamond Food	3–0	Nakhon Ratchasima The Mall	25–19	25–15	25–11			75–45	
4 Apr	18.00	3BB Nakornnont	0–3	Supreme Chonburi	18–25	18–25	16–25			52–75	

=== Week 12 ===
- Venue: MCC Hall The Mall Bangkapi, Bangkok
- Dates: 9–11 April 2021

Date	Time		Score		Set 1	Set 2	Set 3	Set 4	Set 5	Total	Report
9 Apr	15.00	3BB Nakornnont	0–3	Diamond Food	16–25	11–25	21–25			48–75	
9 Apr	18.00	Nakhon Ratchasima The Mall	3–2	Supreme Chonburi	25–17	16–25	18–25	25–21	15–10	99–98	
10 Apr	12.00	Diamond Food	3–1	Supreme Chonburi	19–25	26–24	30–28	25–20		100–97	
10 Apr	18.00	Nakhon Ratchasima The Mall	3–0	3BB Nakornnont	25–16	25–21	29–27			79–64	
11 Apr	12.00	Supreme Chonburi	3–1	3BB Nakornnont	25–16	25–18	24–26	25–19		99–79	
11 Apr	15.00	Nakhon Ratchasima The Mall	1–3	Diamond Food	28–26	19–25	15–25	23–25		85–101	

== Final standing ==
Rank	Team
1st place, gold medalist(s)	Diamond Food
2nd place, silver medalist(s)	Nakhon Ratchasima The Mall
3rd place, bronze medalist(s)	Supreme Chonburi-E.Tech
4	3BB Nakornnont
5	Khonkaen Star
6	Proflex
7	Rangsit University
8	Samut Prakan VC

Qualified for the Asian Championship and Super League
Qualified for the Super League
Relegated to Pro Challenge

2020–21 Women's Thailand League

Champion
Diamond Food (first title)
Team roster
Wiranyupa Inchan, Tikamporn Changkeaw, Nareerat Butkruea, Supattra Kaewpanya, Phatchalin Butdee, Onuma Sittirak, Naphat Rueangdet, Aurairat Laolaem, Jarasporn Bundasak, Nannaphat Moonjakham, Sasipaporn Janthawisut, Hattaya Bamrungsuk, Nootsara Tomkom, Malika Kanthong, Narissara Kaewma, Gullapa Piampongsan, Thanacha Sooksod, Amporn Hyapha, Chompunuch Chitsabai
Head coach
Danai Sriwatcharamethakul

== Awards ==
- Most valuable player
  (Thailand) Onuma Sittirak (Diamond food)
- Best scorer
  (Thailand) Chatchu-on Moksri (Nakhon Ratchasima The Mall)
- Best outside spiker
  (Thailand) Chatchu-on Moksri (Nakhon Ratchasima The Mall)
  (Thailand) Sasipaporn Janthawisut (Diamond food)
- Best servers
  (Thailand) Onuma Sittirak (Diamond food)
- Best middle blocker
  (Thailand) Chitaporn Kamlangmak (Nakhon Ratchasima The Mall)
  (Thailand) Pleumjit Thinkaow (Generali Supreme Chonburi)
- Best setter
  (Thailand) Sirima Manakit (Nakhon Ratchasima The Mall)
- Best opposite spiker
  (Turkey) Yeliz Başa (Nakhon Ratchasima The Mall)
- Best libero
  (Thailand) Yupa Sanitklang (Nakhon Ratchasima The Mall)
