= Pattiya Juangjan =

Thai volleyball player (born 1998)

Personal information
- Full name: Pattiya Juangjan
- Nickname: Mod
- Nationality: Thai
- Born: January 16, 1998 (age 28); Khon Kaen, Thailand
- Height: 1.74 m (5 ft 9 in)
- Weight: 65 kg (143 lb)
- Spike: 300 cm (118 in)
- Block: 280 cm (110 in)

Volleyball information
- Position: Outside hitter
- Current club: Diamond Food

National team
2014–2015	U18 Thailand
2016	U19 Thailand
2016, 2022	Thailand
Honours
Women's volleyball
Representing Thailand
Asian Women's U19 Volleyball Championship
Bronze medal – third place	2016 Nakhon Ratchasima	Team
Asian Youth Championship
Silver medal – second place	2014 Nakhon Ratchasima	Team

Pattiya Juangjan (Thai: ภัททิยา จวงจันทร์, born January 16, 1998) (formerly name Kanittha Juangjan) is a Thai indoor volleyball player. She is a current member of the Thailand women's national volleyball team.

== Clubs ==
- (Thailand) Sisaket (2014–2015)
- (Thailand) Thai-Denmark Nongrua (2015–2016)
- (Thailand) Rangsit (2017–2018)
- (Thailand) Supreme Chonburi E-Tech (2018–2021)
- (Thailand) Khonkaen (2021–2022)
- (Thailand) Diamond Food (2022–2024)

== Awards ==
=== Club ===
- 2018–19 Thailand League - Runner-Up, with Supreme Chonburi
- 2019 Thai–Denmark Super League - Champion, with Supreme Chonburi
- 2023 Asian Club Championship – Runner-up, with Diamond Food–Fine Chef

== National team ==
=== U20 team ===
- 2016 Asian Championship - Bronze Medal

=== U18 team ===
- 2014 Asian Championship - Silver Medal
