= Pornpimol Kunbang =

Thai volleyball player (born 1993)

Personal information
- Nickname: Aiw
- Nationality: Thailand
- Born: 18 June 1993 (age 33)
- Height: 1.78 m (5 ft 10 in)
- Weight: 70 kg (154 lb)
- Spike: 295 cm (116 in)
- Block: 288 cm (113 in)

Volleyball information
- Position: Wing-spiker
- Current club: Supreme Chonburi

National team
2012	Thailand
- Last updated: January 2018

Pornpimol Kunbang (born 18 June 1993) is a Thai indoor volleyball player. She is a member of the Thailand women's national volleyball team.

She participated in the 2012 FIVB Volleyball World Grand Prix.
