= Proflex Women's Volleyball Club =

Thai volleyball team

Proflex
- Full name: Proflex Volleyball Club
- Short name: Proflex
- Founded: 2019
- Ground: Bangkok, Thailand (Capacity: 4,000)
- Chairman: (Thailand) Proflex Whey
- Head coach: (Thailand) Pattharanat Deema
- Captain: (Thailand) Thanyarat Srichainat
- League: Thailand League
- 2020–21: 6th place ▲1

Uniforms
Home	Away

Proflex Volleyball Club is a female professional volleyball team based in Bangkok, Thailand. The club was founded in 2019 after Air Force Women's Volleyball Club transferred the right to compete and plays in the Thailand league.

== Honours ==
=== Domestic competitions ===
==== Youth League ====
- Academy League
  - Third (1): 2019

== Former names ==
- Proflex (2019–present)

== Team colors ==
Thailand League

- (2019–present)

== League results ==
League		Position	Teams	Matches	Win	Lose
Thailand League	2019–20	6	8	13	2	11
Thailand League	2020–21	6	8	12	2	10

== Team roster 2019–20 ==
No.	Player	Position	Date of birth	Height (m)	Country
2	Kanyarat Chintawan	Setter	13 October 1998 (age 27)	1.68	Thailand
3	Natjira Janpengpen	Middle blocker	26 January 1999 (age 26)	1.75	Thailand
4	Piyarat Buddawong	Outside hitter	15 February 2001 (age 24)	1.69	Thailand
5	Supawan Pramrurk	Middle blocker	20 November 2000 (age 25)	1.78	Thailand
8	Thanyarat Srichainat (c)	Opposite	8 September 1997 (age 28)	1.72	Thailand
9	Natthimar Kubkaew	Outside hitter	11 July 1999 (age 26)	1.80	Thailand
10	Chiraporn Roopsom	Middle blocker	20 October 2000 (age 25)	1.72	Thailand
11	Sujiwan Boonchua	Opposite	24 April 1998 (age 27)	1.75	Thailand
13	Pornpimon Khongkaphan	Middle blocker	31 August 2000 (age 25)	1.71	Thailand
14	Nittaya Chamchoy	Outside hitter	28 November 1999 (age 26)	1.70	Thailand
15	Nitiwan Malaert	Libero	15 November 1998 (age 27)	1.66	Thailand
17	Chonlada Ketsarin	Opposite	23 November 2000 (age 25)	1.70	Thailand
18	Phatthira Sukkho	Setter	18 August 2000 (age 25)	1.67	Thailand
19	Chayanee Daengmeaka	Libero	22 April 2000 (age 25)	1.67	Thailand
20	Arirak Ampharat	Middle blocker	17 September 2000 (age 25)	2.02	Thailand
21	Thatdao Kanwitthayi	Outside hitter	7 February 2002 (age 23)	1.70	Thailand
23	Kewalin Suwannawong	Setter	16 February 2002 (age 23)	1.68	Thailand
25	Chularak Nuanboribun	Outside hitter	21 July 2000 (age 25)	1.68	Thailand

== Position Main ==
- The following is the Proflex VC roster in the : Thailand League 2019-20

Proflex VC

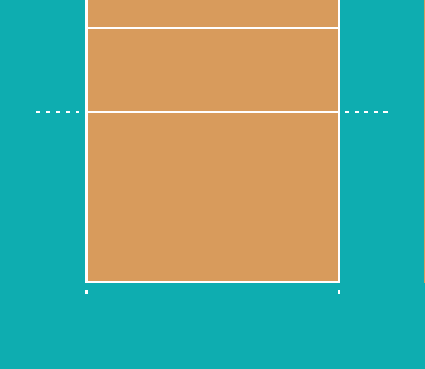

== 2019–20 Results and fixtures ==
=== Thailand League ===
==== First leg ====
date	list	Field	province	rival	Result
19 January 2020	Thailand League 2019-20	(Thailand) MCC Hall The Mall Bangkapi	Bangkok	Generali Supreme Chonburi-E.Tech	0-3 loss
25 February 2020	Thailand League 2019-20	(Thailand) MCC Hall The Mall Bangkapi	Bangkok	Opart 369	3-1 win
29 January 2020	Thailand League 2019-20	(Thailand) MCC Hall The Mall Bangkapi	Bangkok	Diamond Food	0-3 loss
1 February 2020	Thailand League 2019-20	(Thailand) MCC Hall The Mall Nakhon Ratchasima	Nakhon Ratchasima	Rangsit University	2-3 loss
5 February 2020	Thailand League 2019-20	(Thailand) MCC Hall The Mall Nakhon Ratchasima	Nakhon Ratchasima	Nakhon Ratchasima	0-3 loss
8 February 2020	Thailand League 2019-20	(Thailand) MCC Hall The Mall Nakhon Ratchasima	Nakhon Ratchasima	3BB Nakornnont	0-3 loss
15 February 2020	Thailand League 2019-20	(Thailand) Athletics building in the Eastern National Sports Center	Chonburi	Khonkaen Star	0-3 loss

==== second leg ====
date	list	Field	province	rival	Result
22 February 2020	Thailand League 2019-20	(Thailand) MCC Hall The Mall Bangkapi	Bangkok	Khonkaen Star	0-3 loss
23 February 2020	Thailand League 2019-20	(Thailand) MCC Hall The Mall Bangkapi	Bangkok	3BB Nakornnont	1-3 loss
1 March 2020	Thailand League 2019-20	(Thailand) MCC Hall The Mall Bangkapi	Bangkok	Diamond Food	0-3 loss
8 March 2020	Thailand League 2019-20	(Thailand) MCC Hall The Mall Bangkapi	Bangkok	Nakhon Ratchasima	1-3 loss
11 March 2020	Thailand League 2019-20	(Thailand) MCC Hall The Mall Bangkapi	Bangkok	Rangsit University	3-1 win
14 March 2020	Thailand League 2019-20	(Thailand) MCC Hall The Mall Nakhon Ratchasima	Nakhon Ratchasima	Generali Supreme Chonburi-E.Tech	1-3 loss

== Team Captain ==
- (Thailand) Thanyarat Srichainat (2019–present)

== Head coach ==
Season	Name
2019–Present	(Thailand) Pattharanat Deema

== Notable players ==
Domestic Players

Thailand

- Kullporn Kaewrodwai
- Napak Vachalapitikanangkul
- Kultida Hamontree
