= Mylene Paat =

Filipino volleyball player (born 1994)

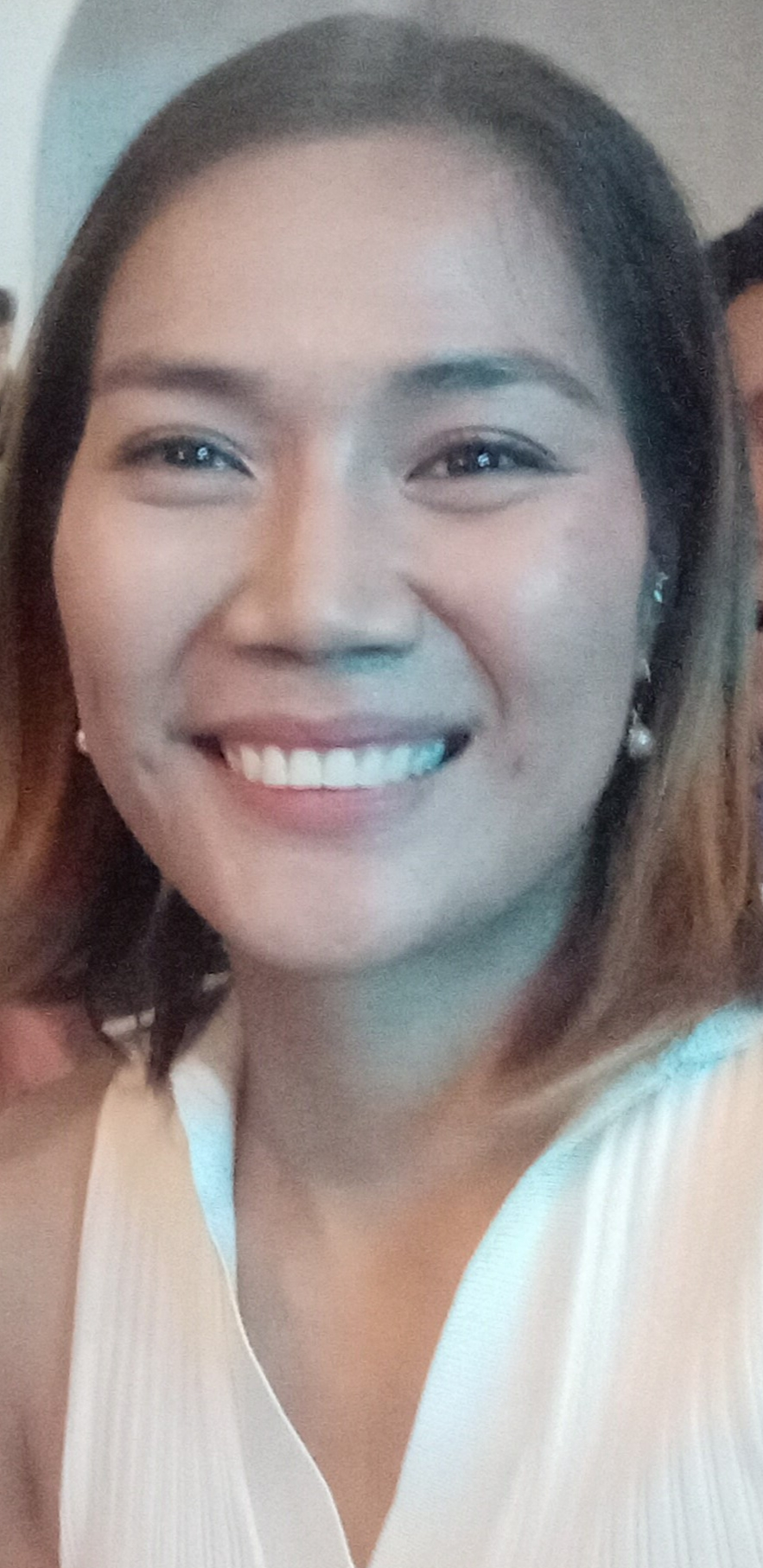
- Mylene Paat at the Adamson Alumni Awards 2024

Personal information
- Full name: Mylene Balan Paat-Rezanova
- Nationality: Filipino
- Born: April 5, 1994 (age 32) Pangasinan, Philippines
- Home town: Bani, Pangasinan
- Education: Adamson University
- Height: 1.80 m (5 ft 11 in)
- Weight: 146 lb (66 kg)
- Spike: 285 cm (112 in)
- Block: 274 cm (108 in)

Volleyball information
- Position: Opposite hitter
- Current club: Farm Fresh Foxies

Career
- Years: Team
- 2016–2020: Cignal HD Spikers
- 2020–2021: Chery Tiggo Crossovers
- 2021: Choco Mucho (AVC)
- 2021–2022: Nakhon Ratchasima
- 2021–2025: Chery Tiggo Crossovers
- 2026–present: Farm Fresh Foxies

National team
- Years: Team
- 2018–2019: Philippines
Honours
Women's volleyball
Representing Philippines
ASEAN Grand Prix
Bronze medal – third place	2019 Nakhon Ratchasima	Leg 1
Bronze medal – third place	2019 Santa Rosa	Leg 2
- Updated on October 2019

Mylene Balan Paat-Rezanova (born April 5, 1994) is a Filipina professional volleyball player for the Farm Fresh Foxies of the Premier Volleyball League (PVL).

At the collegiate level, she played for the Adamson Lady Falcons indoor volleyball and beach volleyball teams. She also represented the Philippines women's national volleyball team.

== Early life ==
Mylene Paat was born in Pangasinan on April 5, 1994 to Dante and Ligaya Paat. She was raised in the town of Bani Paat has five siblings.

Paat took up volleyball at age 16. She enrolled at the University of Baguio before moving to the Adamson University in Manila.

== College career ==
Paat initially played volleyball for the University of Baguio team. At the 2013 InterCol tournament, she was scouted by University Athletic Association of the Philippines (UAAP) teams. She declined an offer to play for the De La Salle Lady Spikers to join Adamson Lady Falcons.

Paat helped the team reach the Final Four in Season 76. She played her last year in the UAAP in Season 78 in 2016. Paat who was already captain by that time was affected by the mid-season resignation of Sherwin Meneses. She foregoes her final playing year, waiving her eligibility to play in Season 79.

== Club career ==
=== Power Smashers and Cignal ===
Paat has played for the Laoag Power Smashers at the 2016 Open Conference of the Shakey's V-League. By late 2016, she moved to the Cignal HD Spikers of the Philippine Super Liga (PSL). She helped Cignal finish as bronze medalists at the 2018 PSL Invitational Cup. Paat last played for Cignal in 2019.

=== First Cherry Tiggo stint ===
Paat joined another PSL team, the Chery Tiggo Crossovers in January 2020. However the COVID-19 pandemic restricted volleyball activities in the Philippines. In March 2021, Cherry Tiggo joined the then newly-professionalized Premier Volleyball League (PVL). Paat then helped Chery Tiggo win their first professional title at the 2021 PVL Open Conference.

Paat was part of the Choco Mucho selection team that played at the 2021 Asian Women's Club Volleyball Championship in October. She returned with Cherry Tiggo, helping the PVL team finish as runners-up in the 2021 PNVF Champions League.

=== Nakhon Ratchasima ===
Paat earned her first overseas contract, when she signed with Nakhon Ratchasima of the Women's Volleyball Thailand League in November 2021. Her stint ended in March 2022, leading her club to a bronze medal finish. She was also named Best Scorer in the season.

=== Second Cherry Tiggo stint ===
After her stint in Thailand, Paat rejoined Chery Tiggo as expected. She was named Conference Most Valuable Player and Best Opposite Hitter at the 2022 PVL Reinforced Conference despite her team not finishing in the podium.

In May 2024, Paat took part at the Women's Asian Quarter Tryouts of the Korean V-League (KOVO). However she and her fellow PVL entrants were left undrafted.

Last playing at the 2024 PVL Reinforced Conference, Paat sustained a shoulder injury rendering her unavailable until the 2025 Invitational Conference. She returned to play in the 2025 Reinforced Conference in October. Cherry Tiggo disbanded in December of the same year making Paat a free agent.

=== Farm Fresh Foxies ===
In January 2026, Paat was signed in by Strong Group Athletics. She was allocated to SGA's Farm Fresh Foxies.

== National team ==
Paat was selected to play for the Philippine squad for teh 2015 Asian Women's U23 Volleyball Championship. However Adamson, reportedly blocked her participation and was later attributed by Paat to be caused by a misunderstanding.

After Ces Molina was injured, Paat was named to the senior team at the 2018 Asian Games. She played in the continetal games in Jakarta and Palembang,, Indonesia and later the 2018 AVC Cup in Thailand.

== Personal life ==
Mylene Paat is married to Kazakh volleyball player Sergey Rezanov. They became engaged in 2023. She began publicly using her husbands surname in 2026.

== Clubs ==
- (Philippines) Laoag Power Smashers (2016)
- (Philippines) Cignal HD Spikers (2016–2019)
- (Philippines) Chery Tiggo Crossovers (2020–2021, 2022–2025)
- (Philippines) Choco Mucho (2021) (Note: National team as club; not to be confused with Choco Mucho Flying Titans)
- (Thailand) Nakhon Ratchasima (2021–2022)
- (Philippines) Farm Fresh Foxies (2026–present)

== Awards ==
=== Individual ===
- 2018 PSL All-Filipino Conference "Best scorer"
- 2021–22 Thailand League "Best scorer"
- 2022 PVL Reinforced Conference "Conference Most Valuable Player"
- 2022 PVL Reinforced Conference "Best opposite spiker"

=== Clubs ===
- 2017 PSL Invitational Cup – Champion, with Cignal HD Spikers
- 2017 PSL All-Filipino Conference – Bronze medal, with Cignal HD Spikers
- 2021 Premier Volleyball League Open Conference – Champion, with Chery Tiggo 7 Pro Crossovers
- 2021 PNVF Champions League (Women) – Silver medal, with Chery Tiggo 7 Pro Crossovers
- 2021–2022 Thailand League – Bronze medal, with Nakhon Ratchasima
- 2024 PNVF Champions League (Women) – Bronze medal, with Chery Tiggo Crossovers
