= Chloe Mann =

American volleyball player (born 1990)

Personal information
- Full name: Genevieve Chloe Mann
- Born: November 12, 1990 (age 35); Florida, United States
- Height: 6 ft 2 in (1.89 m)
- Weight: 165 lb (75 kg)

Volleyball information
- Position: Middle Blocker
- Current club: Supreme Chonburi VC
- Number: 15

Career
Years	Teams
2014–2015	Béziers Volley
2015–2016	3BB Nakornnont
2016–2017	Supreme Chonburi VC

Genevieve "Chloe" Mann (born November 12, 1990) is an American indoor volleyball middle blocker. She played college volleyball at University of Florida.

== Awards ==
=== Individual ===
- 2016 VTV Cup Championship "Best Middle Blocker"
- 2017 Thai-Denmark Super League "Best Scorer"

=== Club ===
- 2016–17 Thailand League - Champion, with Supreme Chonburi
- 2017 Thai-Denmark Super League - Champion, with Supreme Chonburi
- 2017 Asian Club Championship - Champion, with Supreme Chonburi
