= Watchareeya Nuanjam =

Thai volleyball player

Personal information
- Full name: Watchareeya Nuanjam
- Nickname: Miao
- Nationality: Thai
- Born: 22 July 1996 (age 30) Bangkok, Thailand
- Home town: Kamphaeng Phet, Thailand
- Height: 1.78 m (5 ft 10 in)
- Weight: 64 kg (141 lb)
- Spike: 292 cm (115 in)
- Block: 279 cm (110 in)

Volleyball information
- Position: Middle blocker
- Current club: (Thailand) Supreme Chonburi-E.tech
- Number: 17

National team
- Years: Team
- 2018–2023: Thailand

Watchareeya Nuanjam (Thai: วัชรียา นวลแจ่ม; born July 22, 1996) is a Thai indoor volleyball player. She is a current member of the Thailand women's national volleyball team.

== Club ==
- (Thailand) Supreme Chonburi-E.tech (2011–present)

== Awards ==
=== Club ===
- 2013 Thai–Denmark Super League – Runner-up, with Supreme Chonburi
- 2016–17 Thailand League – Champion, with Supreme Chonburi
- 2017 Thai–Denmark Super League – Champion, with Supreme Chonburi
- 2017 Asian Club Championship – Champion, with Supreme Chonburi
- 2017–18 Thailand League – Champion, with Supreme Chonburi
- 2018 Thai–Denmark Super League – Champion, with Supreme Chonburi
- 2018 Asian Club Championship – Champion, with Supreme Chonburi
- 2018–19 Thailand League – Runner-up, with Supreme Chonburi
- 2019 Thai–Denmark Super League – Champion, with Supreme Chonburi
- 2019 Asian Club Championship – Runner-up, with Supreme Chonburi
- 2019–20 Thailand League – Champion, with Supreme Chonburi
