= Suankularb Wittayalai Nonthaburi School =

Coordinates: 13.909628°N 100.511433°E

- Thai: โรงเรียนสวนกุหลาบวิทยาลัย นนทบุรี
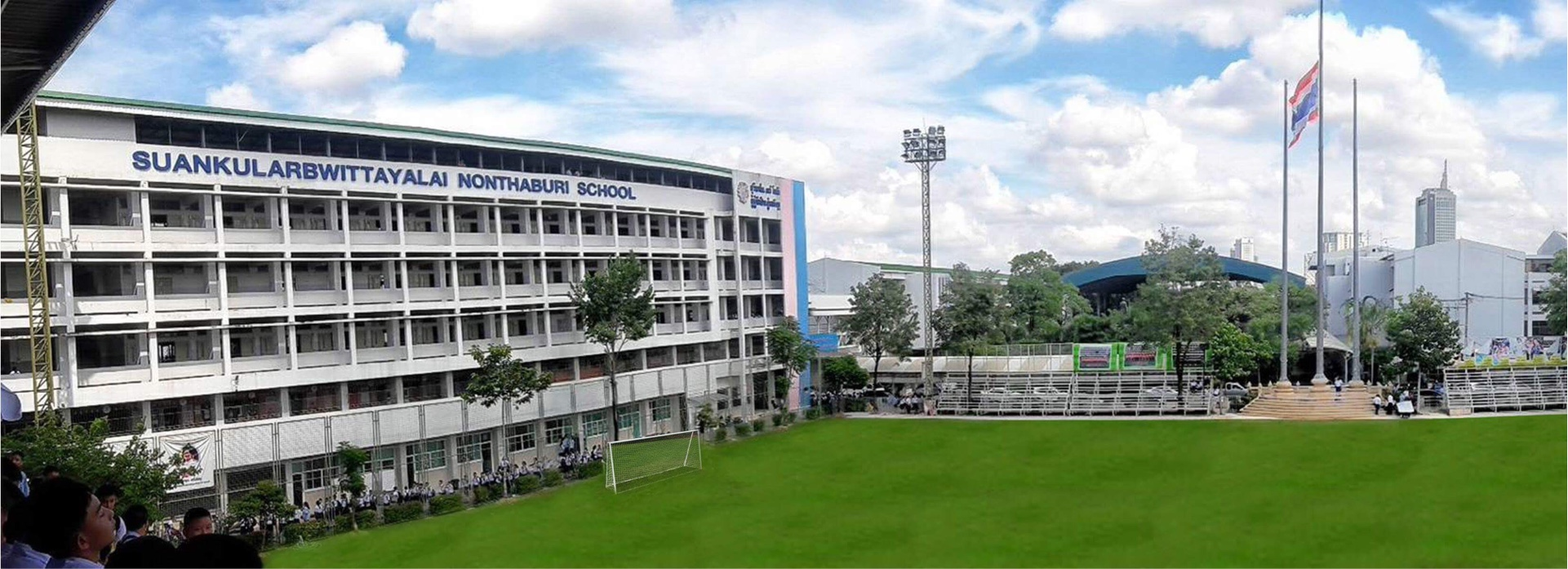

Information
- Established: 1978; 48 years ago
- Staff: c.300
- Grades: Mathayom 1(Grades 7) to Mathayom 6(Grades 12)
- Enrollment: c.4,300 (2017)

Suankularb Wittayalai Nonthaburi School (S.K.N) (Thai: โรงเรียนสวนกุหลาบวิทยาลัย นนทบุรี) is the second school affiliated with Suankularb Wittayalai School. The school is a secondary school for grades 7 through 12 in Thailand (Mathayom 1 to Mathayom 6) under the management of Dr.Yanyalak Surawut, the 90th principal of the school. It is located at 51/4 No. 5 Tiwanon Road, Pak kret Sub-district, Pak kret District, Nonthaburi.

Suankularb Wittayalai Nonthaburi School is a government school and has more than 4,300 students (2017) with over 300 teachers and staff. As the school's location borders the districts of Mueang Pathum Thani of Pathum Thani Province, Don Mueang and Lak Si of Bangkok, Mueang Nonthaburi and Bang Bua Thong of Nonthaburi Province, it attracts students not only from Nonthaburi province but Pathum Thani province, Ayuttaya province and Bangkok as well. Suankularb Wittayalai Nonthaburi School covers approximately 10 acres of land in Nonthaburi Province (north of Bangkok). The school is situated in Pakkret district, Nonthaburi province.

== History ==
Suankularb Wittayalai Nonthaburi School is an extra-large secondary school for boys and girls situated in Pakkred, Nonthaburi Province. The school was founded on March 30, 1978 by Mr. Pasuk Maneejak. It was originally named Suankularb Wittayalai 2 (Pasuk Maneejak) in honour of the person that donated the land, Mr. Pasuk and Mrs. Ngek Maneejak. During its construction, the students enrolled in this school were temporarily sent to other schools. The boys were sent to Suankularb Wittayalai School in Bangkok and the girls were sent to Satri Nonthaburi School.

In 1979, the Ministry of Education changed the school's name from Suankularb Wittayalai 2 to Suankularb Wittayalai Nonthaburi School. Not long after that, HRH Princess Sirindhorn named four buildings after the initials of her name as ST1, ST2, ST3, and ST4 respectively. Sirindharalai meeting hall was also named after her. The buildings were inaugurated twice by the princess herself on August 13, 1981 and November 9, 1992. On July 11, 2012, the Princess came to inaugurate King Rama V monument.

Through the collaborative efforts of the school board, faculty and staff, Suankularb Wittayalai Nonthaburi School is recognized locally and internationally.

== Study programmes ==
=== Lower Secondary (Grade 7–9) ===
- Mini English Programme (MEP - Special Programme)
- Math and Science Programme(SM - Special Programme)
- Intensive Math and Science (Regular Programme)

=== Upper Secondary (Grade 10–12) ===
- Mini English Programme (MEP - Special Programme)
- Math and Science in English (SME - Special Programme)
- Math and Science in Thai (SMT - Special Programme)
- Math and Science (Regular Programme)
- Mathematics and English (Regular Programme)
- Chinese/Japanese/French (Regular Programme)

== School symbol ==
The symbol of Suankularb Wittayalai Nonthaburi School is a book with a ruler, pen and pencil put in the book. On the cover of the book is a royal headdress (the "Pra Kiew" symbol) and royal cypher initials. On the right side, there is a bouquet of roses. To the left of the book, a ribbon tying the bouquet of roses with the name of the school written on it.

== Sports facilities ==
- stadium
- football field
- gymnasium
- indoor swimming pool
- basketball court

== Other facilities ==
- school auditorium
- canteen
- souvenir shop
- small recreation park
- dormitory for school staff
- dormitory for school varsity students: football, volleyball

== Traditions ==
Suankularb Wittayalai Nonthaburi School has many traditional events, including academic Paj chim Day and orientation Day

On orientation day all matayom 6 students welcome first-year students to the school. This day invite director to give a speech, and has a souvenir to give to matayom 1 students.

On Paj chim day is the last day at the school. All matayom 6 students come and dinner together with their teachers. After the dinner each class of matayom 6 sit together in a circle and make a short speech. At the end of the event they sing a “Chompoo-Fah ar lai” song together.

== Directors of Suankularb Wittayalai Nonthaburi School ==
Years in office	Name
1978–1979	Mr. Gamon Thisopra
1979 - 1979	Mr. Prayoon Theerapong
1979–1988	Ms. Ampra Sangthaweesuk
1989–1992	Ms. Sommai Wattanakeree
1992–1994	Ms. Pongsri Buaprachum
1994–1997	Ms. Durtree Pongsart
1997–1999	Ms. Krongthong Duangsong
1999–2002	Mr. Suko Wuthichoth
2002–2004	Mr. Uthai Rattanapong
2004–2009	Dr. Suthisak Fuangkaseam, (Ed.D.)
2010–2012	Dr. Poramest Molee, (Ed.D.)
2013–2014	Dr. Sunee Sorntakul, (Ed.D.)
2014–2016	Dr. Wittaya Srichompoo, (Ed.D.)
2016–2018	Dr. Prayom Junnoi, (Ed.D.)
2018-present	Dr. Surawut Wanyaluxana, (Ed.D)

== Departments ==
- Department of Thai Language
- Department of Vocational Technology
- Department of Mathematics
- Department of Science
- Department of Arts
- Department of Physical Education, Health & Hygiene
- Department of Social Studies
- Department of Foreign Languages

== Facts ==
- Area: 10 acres
- Abbreviation: S.K.N
- Type: Government Secondary School (194 teachers 4,735 students)

== Notes ==
- Foundation Suankularb Wittayalai Nonthaburi School
- Short History of Suankularb Wittayalai Nonthaburi School
- Suankularb Wittayalai Nonthaburi Alumni Association
- Public Relations Officer of Suankularb Wittayalai Nonthaburi School
