= Supreme Volleyball Club =

Thai volleyball club

Supreme Chonburi
- Full name: Supreme TIP (Dhiphaya) Chonburi-E.Tech
- Short name: Supreme
- Nickname: Pink Dolphine
- Founded: 2009 as Supreme Nakhon Si Thammarat Volleyball Club
- Ground: Chonburi Municipality Sport Stadium; Chonburi, Thailand (Capacity: 4,000)
- Chairman: (Thailand) Panuwat Khanthamoleekul
- Head coach: (Thailand) Wilavan Apinyapong
- Captain: (Thailand) Pleumjit Thinkaow
- League: Thailand League
- 2023–2024: 3rd place ▲1
- Championships: Asian Champion Thailand League Champion Super League Champion

Uniforms
Home	Away

Supreme Volleyball Club (Thai: สโมสรวอลเลย์บอลสุพรีม ชลบุรี) is a Thai professional women's volleyball club based in Bangkok and have managed by Supreme Volleyball Club Co., Ltd. which was a subsidiary of Supreme Distribution (Thailand) Co., Ltd. The club was founded in 2009 as Supreme Nakhon Si Thammarat before reformed in to Supreme Chonburi in 2013.

Supreme Volleyball Club won their first Thailand League title in 2016–17, the AVC Club Volleyball Championship title in 2017, and the Super League in 2017.

== Honours ==
=== Domestic competitions ===
==== League ====
- Thailand League :
  - Champion (3): 2016–17, 2017–18, 2019–20
  - Runner-up (4): 2011–12, 2015–16, 2018–19, 2021–22
  - Third (2): 2020–21, 2023–24
- Thai-Denmark Super League :
  - Champion (3): 2017, 2018, 2019
  - Runner-up (2): 2013, 2016

==== Youth League ====
- Academy League
  - Runner-up (4): 2015, 2017, 2018, 2020
  - 4th place (1): 2019
  - 5th place (1): 2016

=== International competitions ===
==== Major ====
- World Championship 1 appearance
  - 2018 — 8th
- Asian Championship 4 appearances
  - 2017 — Champion
  - 2018 — Champion
  - 2019 — Runner-up
  - 2020 — did not qualify because Outbreak of Covid-19 in the world
  - 2021 — Third

==== Minor ====
- VTV International Cup
  - 2016 — Champion

== Former team names ==
- Supreme Nakhon Si Thammarat (2009–2013)
- Supreme Chonburi (2013–2014)
- Supreme Chonburi-E.Tech (2014–2018)
- Generali Supreme Chonburi-E.Tech (2018–2020)
- Supreme Chonburi-E.Tech (2020–2022)
- Supreme TIP (Dhiphaya) Chonburi-E.Tech (2022–present)

== Team colors ==
Thailand League

- (2011–2012)
- (2012–2013)
- (2013–2014)
- (2014–2015)
- (2015–2016)
- (2016–17)
- (2017–18)
- (2018–19)
- (2019–21)
- (2021–present)

Thai-Denmark Super League

- (2013)
- (2014)
- (2015)
- (2016)
- (2017)
- (2018)
- (2019)

== League results ==
League		Position	Teams	Matches	Win	Lose
Thailand League	2011–12	Runner-up	8	14	–	–
Thailand League	2012–13	5	8	14	6	8
Thailand League	2013–14	6	8	14	6	8
Thailand League	2014–15	6	8	14	7	7
Thailand League	2015–16	Runner-up	8	14	9	5
Thailand League	2016–17	Champion	8	14	14	0
Thailand League	2017–18	Champion	8	14	13	1
Thailand League	2018–19	Runner-up	8	16	12	4
Thailand League	2019–20	Champion	8	19	17	2
Thailand League	2020–21	3rd place	8	18	11	7
Thailand League	2021–22	Runner-up	8	17	16	1
Thailand League	2022–23	4th place	8	17	11	6
Thailand League	2023–24	3rd place	8	17	10	7
Thailand League	2024–25	TBD	8			

== Crest ==
The club logo incorporates elements from their nickname; The Pink Dolphine and their owner; Supreme Distribution (Thailand) Co., Ltd.

== Stadium and locations ==
Coordinates	Location	Stadium	Capacity	Year
8°09′54″N 99°40′48″E	Thung Song, Nakhon Si Thammarat	Thung Song Municipality Sport Stadium	4,000	2009–2013
13°21′53″N 100°58′35″E	Chonburi, Chonburi	Chonburi Municipality Sport Stadium	4,000	2013–present
13°09′55″N 100°56′10″E	Si Racha, Chonburi	Assumption College Sriracha	4,000	2017–2018

== Team roster 2023–24 ==
As of November 2023

No.	Player	Position	Date of Birth	Height (m)	Country
1	Supattra Pairoj	Libero	27 June 1990 (age 36)	1.60	Thailand
2	Natthamon Lueangwattanawilai	Libero	12 August 2005 (age 21)	1.58	Thailand
3	Kannika Thipachot	Outside Hitter	3 May 1993 (age 33)	1.68	Thailand
4	Kanyarat Kunmuang	Middle blocker	14 October 2002 (age 24)	1.83	Thailand
5	Pleumjit Thinkaow(c)	Middle Blocker	9 November 1983 (age 43)	1.80	Thailand
6	Supawadee Phunwilai	Opposite	20 July 2007 (age 19)	1.88	Thailand
7	Natthimar Kubkaew	Outside Hitter	11 July 1999 (age 27)	1.80	Thailand
8	Tirawan Sang-ob	Middle Blocker	26 April 1998 (age 28)	1.76	Thailand
9	Kanokporn Sangthong	Setter	28 March 2005 (age 21)	1.70	Thailand
10	Sasiprapa Maneewong	Setter	10 October 2003 (age 23)	1.75	Thailand
11	Hoang Thi Kieu Trinh	Opposite	11 February 2001 (age 25)	1.77	Vietnam
12	Amonrada Loeksawang	Middle blocker	12 August 2002 (age 24)	1.78	Thailand
14	Siriwan Deekaew	Outside Hitter	3 November 2004 (age 22)	1.77	Thailand
15	Malika Kanthong	Opposite	8 January 1987 (age 39)	1.78	Thailand
16	Waranya Srilaoong	Outside Hitter	20 October 2002 (age 24)	1.77	Thailand
17	Watchareeya Nuanjam	Middle Blocker	22 June 1996 (age 30)	1.78	Thailand
18	Achirayaphorn Kumjaiboon	Opposite	28 October 2004 (age 22)	1.82	Thailand
19	Waraporn Poomjarern	Setter	11 August 1985 (age 41)	1.69	Thailand
20	Nakarinporn Budda	Outside Hitter	26 April 2005 (age 21)	1.75	Thailand
22	Doan Thi Lam Oanh	Setter	6 July 1998 (age 28)	1.78	Vietnam
23	Suchawadee Sriraksa	Libero	23 April 2005 (age 21)	1.71	Thailand
26	Darin Pinsuwan	Outside Hitter	30 August 1994 (age 32)	1.71	Thailand
28	Maria Eduarda Leite de Farias	Outside Hitter	5 April 2005 (age 21)	1.81	Brazil
55	Thanawan Arunmueng	Setter	5 May 2003 (age 23)	1.74	Thailand

=== Team staff ===
As of November 2023

Name	Position	Country
Panuwat Khanthamoleekul	Chairman	Thailand
Thanadit Prasopnetr	Team Manager	Thailand
Nataphon Srisamutnak	Technical Manager	Thailand
Wilavan Apinyapong	Head coach	Thailand
Nipon Jamjang	Assistant coach	Thailand
Thitirat Kadudom	Assistant coach	Thailand
Attapon Sorndee	Assistant coach	Thailand
Nampueng Khamart	Assistant coach	Thailand
Warut Promsri	Strength and conditioning coach	Thailand
Ratkamon Chiraamnouiphon	Physical therapist	Thailand
Sujittra Vachaiyoog	Physical therapist	Thailand
Proramate Saisuksophon	Photographer	Thailand

== 2023–24 Results and fixtures ==
=== Thailand League ===
==== First leg ====
date	list	Field	province	rival	Result
12 November 2023	Thailand League 2023–24	(Thailand) Nimibutr Sport Center	Bangkok	RSU	3–1 win
18 November 2023	Thailand League 2023–24	(Thailand) Nimibutr Sport Center	Bangkok	Nakornnont	3–0 win
26 December 2023	Thailand League 2023–24	(Thailand) Nimibutr Sport Center	Bangkok	Diamond Food VC	2–3 loss
29 November 2023	Thailand League 2023–24	(Thailand) Nimibutr Sport Center	Bangkok	Kaennakorn -Thailand National Sports University	3–0 win
3 December 2023	Thailand League 2023–24	(Thailand) Nimibutr Sport Center	Bangkok	EUREKA - Sisaket	3–0 win
9 December 2023	Thailand League 2023–24	(Thailand) Nakhon Pathom Sports Center Gymnasium	Nakhon Pathom	Nakhon Ratchasima QminC	0–3 loss
17 December 2023	Thailand League 2023–24	(Thailand) Nakhon Pathom Sports Center Gymnasium	Nakhon Pathom	Khon Kaen University-Khonkaen Star	3–2 win

==== Second leg ====
date	list	Field	province	rival	Result
24 December 2023	Thailand League 2023–24	(Thailand) MCC Hall The mall Nakhon Ratchasima	Nakhon Ratchasima	Nakornnont	3–0 win
7 January 2024	Thailand League 2023–24	(Thailand) MCC Hall The mall Nakhon Ratchasima	Nakhon Ratchasima	Khon Kaen University-Khonkaen Star	3–0 win
14 January 2024	Thailand League 2023–24	(Thailand) Nimibutr Sport Center	Bangkok	Diamond Food VC	1–3 loss
21 January 2024	Thailand League 2023–24	(Thailand) Nimibutr Sport Center	Bangkok	Nakhonn Ratchasrima QminC VC	1–3 loss
27 January 2024	Thailand League 2023–24	(Thailand) Nimibutr Sport Center	Bangkok	Kaennakorn -Thailand National Sports University	3–0 win

==== Final Round ====
date	list	Field	province	rival	Result
9 February 2024	Thailand League 2023–24	(Thailand) Nimibutr Sport Center	Bangkok	Nakhonn Ratchasrima QminC VC	2–3 loss
10 February 2027	Thailand League 2023–24	(Thailand) Nimibutr Sport Center	Bangkok	Diamond Food VC	1–3 loss
11 February 2027	Thailand League 2023–24	(Thailand) Nimibutr Sport Center	Bangkok	Khon Kaen University-Khonkaen Star	3–1 win

==== Semi Final ====
Date	Time		Score		Set 1	Set 2	Set 3	Set 4	Set 5	Total	Report
16 Feb	16:00	Supreme TIP Chonburi-E.Tech	2–3	Diamond Food VC	25–15	25–16	25–27	21–25	8–15	104–98	

==== 3rd place ====
Date	Time		Score		Set 1	Set 2	Set 3	Set 4	Set 5	Total	Report
17 Feb	16:00	Supreme TIP Chonburi-E.Tech	3–0	Khon Kaen University-Khonkaen Star	25–15	25–13	25–21			75–49	

== Imports ==
Season	No.	Name	Position	Country	Competing shows			
Season	No.	Name	Position	Country	Thailand League		Thai-Denmark Super League	AVC Club Volleyball Championship
Season	No.	Name	Position	Country	leg 1	leg 2	Thai-Denmark Super League	AVC Club Volleyball Championship
2013–14	21	Misao Tanyama	Setter	Japan	–		✔	–
2014–15	21	Alaina Bergsma	Outside Hitter	United States	–		✔	–
2015–16	12	Deedee Harrison	Middle Blocker	United States	✔	–		
2015–16	6	Ashley Frazier	Outside Hitter	United States	✔			–
2015–16	21	Márcia Fusieger	Middle Blocker	Brazil	–	✔		–
2015–16	23	Karmen Kočar	Setter	Slovenia	–		✔	–
2016–17	19	Fatou Diouck	Opposite	Senegal	✔			
2016–17	15	Chloe Mann	Middle Blocker	United States	✔			
2017–18	22	Sareea Freeman	Opposite	United States	✔			–
2017–18	14	Aleoscar Blanco	Middle Blocker	Venezuela	✔			–
2017–18	19	Fatou Diouck	Opposite	Senegal	–			✔
2017–18	8	Taylor Sandbothe	Middle Blocker	United States	–			✔
2018–19	19	Fatou Diouck	Opposite	Senegal	✔	–		
2018–19	6	Mercy Moim	Outside Hitter	Kenya	–	✔	–	
2018–19	9,4	Wang Na	Setter	China	–	✔		
2018–19	23	Zhang Xiaoya	Middle Blocker	China	–		✔	–
2018–19	19,9	Aprilia Manganang	Outside Hitter	Indonesia	–		✔	
2019–20	23	Zhang Xiaoya	Middle Blocker	China	✔		–	
2019–20	24	Jie Sun	Opposite	China	✔		–	
2020–21	23	Megawati Hangestri Pertiwi	Outside Hitter	Indonesia	–	✔	–	
2022–23	21	Yeliz Basa	Opposite	Turkey	–	✔	–	
2022–23	26	Che Wenhan	Outside Hitter	China	–	✔	–	
2023–24	11	Hoang Thi Kieu Trinh	Opposite	Vietnam	–	✔	–	
2023–24	22	Doan Thi Lam Oanh	Setter	Vietnam	–	✔	–	
2023–24	28	Maria Eduarda Leite de Farias	Outside Hitter	Brazil	–	✔	–	

== Head coach ==
Years	Name	Country
2009–2015	Nipon Jamjang	Thailand
2015–2022	Nataphon Srisamutnak	Thailand
2023–	Wilavan Apinyapong	Thailand

== Team Captains ==
Years	Name	Country
2010–2015	Wannaporn Pichprom	Thailand
2015–2021	Wilavan Apinyapong	Thailand
2021–Present	Pleumjit Thinkaow	Thailand

== Club player award ==
Season	Player	Award
2023–24	(Thailand) Siriwan Deekaew	Best Outside Hitter
2023–24	(Thailand) Pleumjit Thinkaow	Best Middle Blocker
2022–23	No Award	
2021–22	(Thailand) Kannika Thipachot	Best Outside Hitter
2021–22	(Thailand) Soraya Phomla	Best Setter
2021–22	(Thailand) Malika Kanthong	Best Opposite
2020–21	(Thailand) Pleumjit Thinkaow	Best Middle Blocker
2019–20	(Thailand) Ajcharaporn Kongyot	MVP
2019–20	(Thailand) Sutadta Chuewulim	Best Outside Hitter
2019–20	(Thailand) Soraya Phomla	Best Serve
2019–20	(Thailand) Pleumjit Thinkaow	Best Middle Blocker
2018–19	(Thailand) Wilavan Apinyapong	Best Outside Hitter
2018–19	(Thailand) Pleumjit Thinkaow	Best Middle Blocker
2017–18	(Thailand) Ajcharaporn Kongyot	MVP
2017–18	(United States) Sareea Freeman	Most Valuable Foreign Player
2017–18	(Thailand) Watchareeya Nualjam	Best Middle Blocker
2017–18	(Thailand) Soraya Phomla	Best Setter
2017–18	(Thailand) Malika Kanthong	Best Opposite
2016–17	(Thailand) Ajcharaporn Kongyot	MVP
2016–17	(Thailand) Ajcharaporn Kongyot	Best Outside Hitter
2016–17	(Thailand) Wilavan Apinyapong	Best Outside Hitter
2016–17	(Thailand) Soraya Phomla	Best Setter
2016–17	(Thailand) Supattra Pairoj	Best Libero
2015–16	(United States) Ashley Frazier	Best Server
2014–15	(Thailand) Ajcharaporn Kongyot	Best Outside Hitter
2013–14	(Thailand) Ajcharaporn Kongyot	Best Outside Hitter
2012–13	(Thailand) Ajcharaporn Kongyot	Best Server
2010–11	(Thailand) Wannaporn Pichprom	Best Setter

== Notable players ==
Domestic players

Thailand

- Pornpimol Kunbang
- Wannaporn Pichprom
- Utaiwan Kaensing
- Chutima Srisaikaew
- Rattanaporn Sanuanram
- Chatchu-on Moksri
- Thipvimon Pookongnam
- Chamaiporn Phokha
- Bualee Jaroensri
- Gullapa Piampongsan (loan form Khonkaen stars)
- Nootsara Tomkom
- Napatsorn Ammarinrat
- Thanacha Suksod
- Wilavan Apinyapong
- Ajcharaporn Kongyot (loan to (Turkey) Sarıyer Belediyespor in season 2022–23 and (Japan) NEC Red Rockets) in season 2023–24)
- Wipawee Srithong
- Nampueng Khamart
- Pimtawan Thongyos
- Soraya Phomla (break from volleyball)
- Piyanut Pannoy (loan to (Azerbaijan) Azerrail Baku in season 2023–24)
- Sutadta Chuewulim
- Panatda Chaiyaphet

Foreign players

United States

- Alaina Bergsma (2015)
- Deedee Harrison (2015)
- Ashley Frazier (2015–2016)
- Chloe Mann (2016–2017)
- Sareea Freeman (2017–2018)
- Taylor Sandbothe (2018)

Brazil

- Márcia Fusieger (2015–2016)
- Maria Eduarda Leite de Farias (2023–2024)

Japan

- Misao Tanyama (2014)

Slovenia

- Karmen Kočar (2015–2016)

Senegal

- Fatou Diouck (2016–2017), (2018)

Venezuela

- Aleoscar Blanco (2017–2018)

Kenya

- Mercy Moim (2018–2019)

Indonesia

- Aprilia Manganang (2019)
- Megawati Hangestri Pertiwi (2020–2021)

China

- Wang Na (2018–2019)
- Zhang Xiaoya (2019–2020)
- Jie Sun (2019–2020)
- Che Wenhan (2022–2023)

Turkey

- Yeliz Basa (2022–2023)

Vietnam

- Doan Thi Lam Oanh (2023–2024)
- Hoang Thi Kieu Trinh (2023–2024)
