= Malika Kanthong =

Thai volleyball player (born 1987)

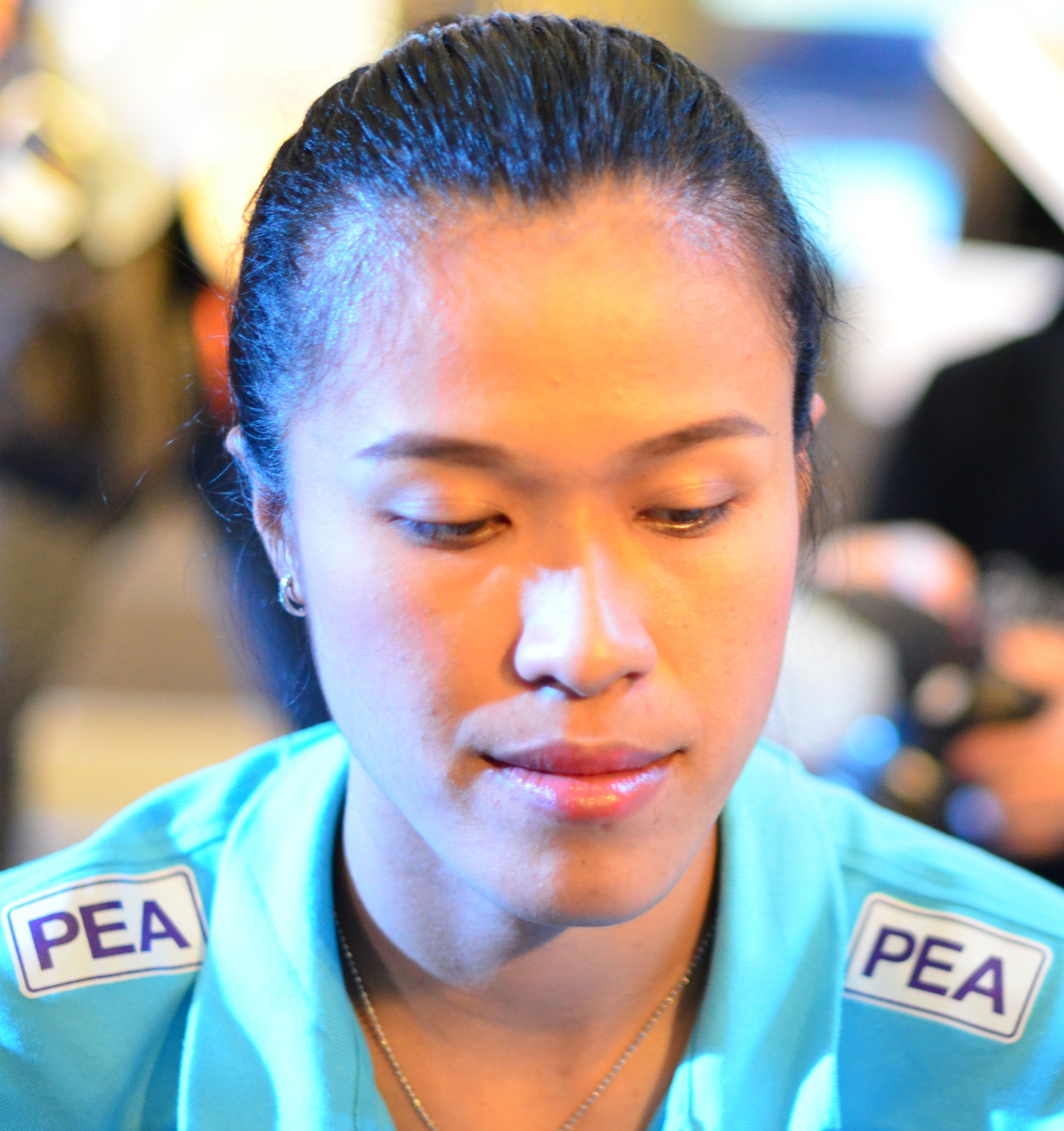

Personal information
- Nickname: Pu
- Nationality: Thai
- Born: January 8, 1987 (age 39); Ang Thong, Thailand
- Height: 1.78 m (5 ft 10 in)
- Weight: 63 kg (139 lb)
- Spike: 292 cm (115 in)
- Block: 278 cm (109 in)

Volleyball information
- Position: Universal
- Current club: (Thailand) Supreme Chonburi
- Number: 15

National team
2004–2021 (17 years)	Thailand
Honours
Women's volleyball
Representing Thailand
Summer Universiade
Bronze medal – third place	2013 Kazan	Team
Montreux Volley Masters
Silver medal – second place	2016 Switzerland
Asian Games
Silver medal – second place	2018 Jakarta/Palembang	Team
Bronze medal – third place	2014 Incheon	Team
Asian Championship
Gold medal – first place	2009 Hanoi
Gold medal – first place	2013 Nakhon Ratchasima
Silver medal – second place	2019 Seoul
Bronze medal – third place	2007 Nakhon Ratchasima
Bronze medal – third place	2015 Tianjin
Asian Cup
Gold medal – first place	2012 Almaty
Silver medal – second place	2010 Taicang
Bronze medal – third place	2008 Nakhon Ratchasima
Bronze medal – third place	2016 Vĩnh Phúc
Bronze medal – third place	2018 Nakhon Ratchasima
ASEAN Grand Prix
Gold medal – first place	2019 Nakhon Ratchasima	Team
Southeast Asian Games
Gold medal – first place	2007 Nakhon Ratchasima	Team
Gold medal – first place	2009 Vientiane	Team
Gold medal – first place	2011 Jakarta/Palembang	Team
Gold medal – first place	2013 Naypyidaw	Team
Gold medal – first place	2019 Philippines	Team

Malika Kanthong (Thai: มลิกา กันทอง, born January 8, 1987) is a member of the Thailand women's national volleyball team.

== Career ==
Malika won the Best Server individual award of the 2015 – 16 Azerbaijan Super League season, playing with Azeryol Baku, which lost to Lokomotiv Baku the bronze medal 0-3. She played in the 2010 and 2011 Club World Championship, placing fifth with the Thai club Federbrau and Chang. She played the 2015 – 16 Azerbaijan Super League with Azeryol Baku and ended the season in fourth place.

She is on the list for the 2019 Korea-Thailand all-star super match competition.

== Clubs ==
- (Vietnam) Tan Hao (2006 – 2007)
- (Thailand) Federbrau (2008 – 2009)
- (Turkey) Ereğli Belediye (2009 – 2010)
- (China) Fujian Xi Meng Bao (2010 – 2011)
- (Thailand) Chang (2010 – 2011)
- (Azerbaijan) Igtisadchi Baku (2012 – 2013)
- (Indonesia) Jakarta Pertamina (2013 – 2015)
- (Thailand) Nonthaburi (2011 – 2014)
- (Azerbaijan) Azeryol Baku (2015 – 2017)
- (Thailand) Supreme Chonburi (2017 – 2018)
- (Thailand) Nakhon Ratchasima (2018 – 2019)
- (Thailand) Diamond Food (2019 – 2021)
- (Thailand) Supreme Chonburi (2021 – Present)

== Awards ==
=== Individuals ===
- 2009 FIVB World Grand Champions Cup – "Best server"
- 2014-15 Indonesian Proliga – "Best server"
- 2015–16 Azerbaijan Super League – "Best server"
- 2016–17 Azerbaijan Super League – "Best receiver"
- 2017–18 Thailand League – "Best opposite spiker"
- 2018–19 Thailand League – "Best opposite spiker"

=== Clubs ===
- 2010–11 Chinese League Division 2 – Champion, with Fujian Xi Meng Bao
- 2011–12 Thailand League – Champion, with Nakornnonthaburi
- 2012–13 Azerbaijan Super League – Runner-up, with Igtisadchi Baku
- 2013–14 Indonesia League – Champion, with Jakarta Pertamina
- 2014–15 Indonesia League – Champion, with Jakarta Pertamina
- 2016–17 Azerbaijan Super League – Runner-up, with Azerrail Baku
- 2017–18 Thailand League – Champion, with Supreme Chonburi
- 2018 Thai–Denmark Super League – Champion, with Supreme Chonburi
- 2018–19 Thailand League – Champion, with Nakhon Ratchasima
- 2007 Asian Club Championship – Runner-up, with Sang Som
- 2008 Asian Club Championship – Runner-up, with Sang Som
- 2009 Asian Club Championship – Champion, with Federbrau
- 2010 Asian Club Championship – Champion, with Federbrau
- 2011 Asian Club Championship – Champion, with Chang
- 2012 Asian Club Championship – Bronze medal, with Chang

== Royal decorations ==
- 2013 - Commander (Third Class) of The Most Exalted Order of the White Elephant
- 2010 - Commander (Third Class) of The Most Admirable Order of the Direkgunabhorn
