= Onuma Sittirak =

Thai volleyball player (born 1986)

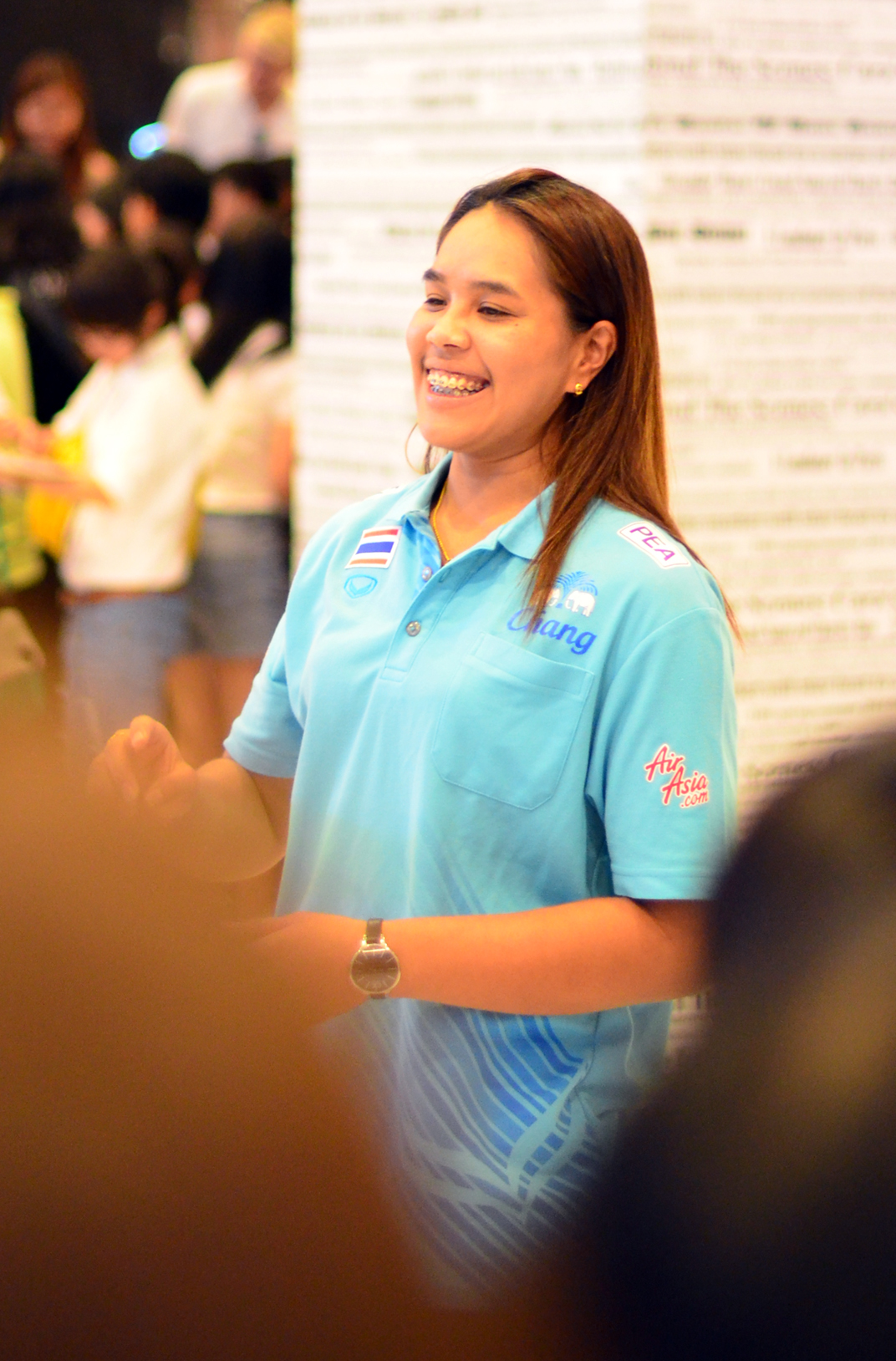

Personal information
- Full name: Onuma Sittirak
- Nickname: Aon
- Nationality: Thai
- Born: June 13, 1986 (age 40) Khian Sa, Surat Thani, Thailand
- Home town: Bangkok
- Height: 1.76 m (5 ft 9 in)
- Weight: 72 kg (159 lb)
- Spike: 304 cm (120 in)
- Block: 285 cm (112 in)

Volleyball information
- Position: Outside spiker
- Current club: Nakornnonth
- Number: 6

National team
- Years: Team
- 2005–2021: Thailand
Honours
Women's volleyball
Representing Thailand
Summer Universiade
Bronze medal – third place	2013 Kazan	Team
Montreux Volley Masters
Silver medal – second place	2016 Switzerland
Asian Games
Silver medal – second place	2018 Jakarta/Palembang	Team
Bronze medal – third place	2014 Incheon	Team
Asian Championship
Gold medal – first place	2009 Hanoi
Gold medal – first place	2013 Nakhon Ratchasima
Silver medal – second place	2019 Seoul
Bronze medal – third place	2007 Nakhon Ratchasima
Bronze medal – third place	2015 Tianjin
Asian Cup
Gold medal – first place	2012 Almaty
Silver medal – second place	2010 Taicang
Bronze medal – third place	2008 Nakhon Ratchasima
Bronze medal – third place	2018 Nakhon Ratchasima
ASEAN Grand Prix
Gold medal – first place	2019 Nakhon Ratchasima	Team
Southeast Asian Games
Gold medal – first place	2007 Nakhon Ratchasima	Team
Gold medal – first place	2009 Vientiane	Team
Gold medal – first place	2011 Jakarta/Palembang	Team
Gold medal – first place	2013 Naypyidaw	Team
Gold medal – first place	2015 Singapore	Team
Gold medal – first place	2019 Philippines	Team
- Updated on October 2012

Onuma Sittirak (Thai: อรอุมา สิทธิรักษ์, RTGS: On-uma Sitthirak, pronounced [ʔɔ̄ːn.ʔū.māː sìt.tʰí.rák]; born June 13, 1986, in Khian Sa) is a Thai volleyball player and was a member of Thailand women's national volleyball team. She graduated from Ratna Bundit University.

== Career ==
Onuma started playing volleyball as a spiker for Thailand's national team in 2006. In 2009, she helped the Thai team won the Asian Championship for the first time and was also awarded the Most Valuable Player of the tournament. During the tournament, she was called "Thailand's Toy Cannon" in an article by the Asian Volleyball Confederation.

In addition, Onuma won the 2009 Asian Club Championship with her team Federbrau and was selected as the Most Valuable Player and Best Spiker.

She repeated as champion in the 2010 Asian Club Championship and also won the Best Spiker and Best Scorer of the event. She later participated in the 2010 Club World Championship, finishing in the fifth place playing with Federbrau and the 2011 Club World Championship also ranked fifth, this time with Chang.

In 2013 she won the 8th Siamsport Awards Popular Vote.

On 6 August 2014 it was announced that she will be joining JT Marvelous.

She was on the list 2019 Korea-Thailand all star super match competition.

Onuma retired at the age of 35, after the 2021 FIVB Volleyball Women's Nations League.

== Clubs ==
- (Thailand) BEC World (2004)
- (Turkey) Filly (2005–2006)
- (Vietnam) Quang Ninh (2007–2008)
- (Thailand) Federbrau (2008–2009)
- (Switzerland) Zeiler Köniz (2008–2010)
- (Thailand) Kathu Phuket (2010)
- (Russia) Dinamo Kazan (2010–2011)
- (Thailand) Chang (2010–2011)
- (Thailand) Kathu Phuket (2011–2012)
- (Azerbaijan) Igtisadchi Baku (2012–2014)
- (Thailand) Idea Khonkaen (2013)
- (Thailand) Nakhon Ratchasima (2014–2016)
- (Japan) JT Marvelous (2014–2017)
- (Thailand) Nakhon Ratchasima (2017–2019)
- (Thailand) Diamond Food (2019–2022)
- (Vietnam) Kinh Bac Bac Ninh (2022)
- (Vietnam) Geleximco Thai Binh (2022)
- (Thailand) Nakhon Ratchasima (2022–present)

== Awards ==
=== Individuals ===
- 2004 Asian Club Championship – "Miss Volleyball"
- 2009 Asian Championship – "Most valuable player"
- 2009 Asian Club Championship – "Most valuable player"
- 2009 Asian Club Championship – "Best spiker"
- 2010 Asian Club Championship – "Best scorer"
- 2010 Asian Club Championship – "Best spiker"
- 2011–12 Thailand League – "Best scorer"
- 2012 Asian Cup – "Most valuable player"
- 2012 Asian Cup – "Best scorer"
- 2012 Asian Cup – "Best spiker"
- 2013 Thai-Denmark Super League – "Most valuable player"
- 2013 FIVB World Grand Champions Cup – "Best outside spiker"
- 2018–19 Thailand League – "Most valuable player"

=== Clubs ===
- 2010–11 Russian Super League – Champion, with Dinamo Kazan
- 2010–11 Thailand League – Champion, with Kathu Phuket
- 2012–13 Azerbaijan Super League – Runner-up, with Igtisadchi Baku
- 2013 Thai–Denmark Super League – Champion, with Idea Khonkaen
- 2013–14 Thailand League – Champion, with Nakhon Ratchasima
- 2014–15 V.Challenge League – Champion, with JT Marvelous
- 2015–16 V.Challenge League – Champion, with JT Marvelous
- 2017–18 Thailand League – Runner-up, with Nakhon Ratchasima
- 2018–19 Thailand League – Champion, with Nakhon Ratchasima
- 2009 Asian Club Championship – Champion, with Federbrau
- 2010 Asian Club Championship – Champion, with Federbrau
- 2011 Asian Club Championship – Champion, with Chang
- 2012 Asian Club Championship – Bronze medal, with Chang

== Royal decorations ==
- 2015 – Companion (Fourth Class) of The Most Admirable Order of the Direkgunabhorn
- 2013 – Commander (Third Class) of The Most Exalted Order of the White Elephant
- 2010 – Gold Medalist (Sixth Class) of The Most Admirable Order of the Direkgunabhorn

Awards
Preceded by (Japan) Miyuki Takahashi	Most Valuable Player of Asian Championship; 2009	Succeeded by (China) Wang Yimei
