= Nakornnonthaburi Volleyball Club =

Thai volleyball club

GLO Miracle Nakhonnont VC
- Full name: GLO Miracle Nakhonnont VC
- Nickname: Pheasant destroyer
- Founded: 2011
- Ground: Nonthaburi Youth Centre; Nonthaburi, Thailand (Capacity: 300)
- Chairman: (Thailand) Parawee Hoysang
- Head coach: (Thailand) Thanakit Inleang
- League: Thailand League
- 2025-2026: 5th place

Uniforms
Home	Away

GLO Miracle Nakhonnont is a female professional volleyball team based in Nonthaburi, Thailand. The club was founded in 2011 and plays in the Thailand league.

== Honours ==
=== Domestic competitions ===
- Thailand League
  - Champion (1): 2011–12
  - Runner-up (2): 2008, 2012–13
  - Third (1): 2018–19
- Thai-Denmark Super League
  - Runner-up (1): 2015
  - Third (3): 2017, 2018, 2019

==== Youth League ====
- Academy League U18 Thailand League
  - Champion (1): 2017, 2018, 2019, 2020
  - Runner-up (1): 2016
  - Third (1): 2015

== Former names ==
- Saijo-denki Nakornnonthaburi (2011–2012)
- Nakornnonthaburi (2012–2013)
- 3BB Nakornnont (2013–present)

== Team colors ==
Thailand League

- (2011–present)

Thai-Denmark Super League

- (2013–present)

== Stadium and locations ==
Coordinates	Location	Stadium	Capacity	Year
13°52′45″N 100°32′36″E	Nonthaburi	Nonthaburi Youth Centre	3000	2011–Present

== Crest ==
he club logo incorporates elements from their nickname; The Red Dino and their owner Pheasant destroyer 3 Broad Band

== League results ==
League		Position	Teams	Matches	Win	Lose
Thailand League	2011-12	Champion	8	14	–	–
Thailand League	2012-13	Runner-up	8	14	–	–
Thailand League	2013-14	5th place	8	14	6	8
Thailand League	2014-15	4th place	8	14	8	6
Thailand League	2015-16	5th place	8	14	9	5
Thailand League	2016-17	4th place	8	14	7	7
Thailand League	2017-18	5th place	8	14	7	7
Thailand League	2018-19	3rd place	8	16	11	5
Thailand League	2019-20	4th place	8	19	10	9

== Team roster 2020–21 ==
As of November 2019

Head coach : (Thailand) Thanakit Inleang

No.	Player	Position	Date of birth	Height (m)
1	(Thailand) Sujitra Phosom	Libero	26 June 1988 (age 38)	1.66
2	(Thailand) Sirikanda Wongsopha	Opposite	18 July 2001 (age 25)	1.70
3	(Thailand) Tichaya Boonlert	Setter	14 February 1997 (age 29)	1.79
4	(Thailand) Parichat Intharasit	Setter	22 July 2001 (age 25)	1.67
5	(Thailand) Wimonrat Tanapan	Middle Blocker	2 April 2002 (age 24)	1.80
6	(Thailand) Kuttika Kaewpin (c)	Outside Hitter	16 August 1994 (age 31)	1.68
8	(Thailand) Wasana Sawangsri	Middle Blocker	21 July 1989 (age 37)	1.78
9	(Thailand) Jidapa Nahuanong	Libero	22 February 2002 (age 24)	1.65
10	(Thailand) Saowapha Soosuk	Middle Blocker	9 March 2002 (age 24)	1.73
11	(Thailand) Aonanong Saisri	Outside Hitter	28 January 2001 (age 25)	1.70
12	(Thailand) Pimpichaya Kokram	Opposite	16 June 1998 (age 28)	1.78
13	(Thailand) Tichakorn Boonlert	Middle Blocker	21 March 2001 (age 25)	1.81
14	(Thailand) Sineenat Phocharoen	Opposite	19 May 1995 (age 31)	1.72
15	(Thailand) Supatcha Kamtaraksa	Setter	28 July 2002 (age 24)	1.76
16	(Thailand) Supawan Boonsaklerk	Outside Hitter	22 January 1999 (age 27)	1.73
23	(Thailand) Jutarat Montripila	Outside Hitter	2 October 1986 (age 33)	1.73

== Sponsors ==
- 3BB Internet
- Grand Sport

== Position Main ==
- The following is the 3BB Nakornnont roster in the : Thailand League 2020-21

Thai-Denmark Khonkaen Star

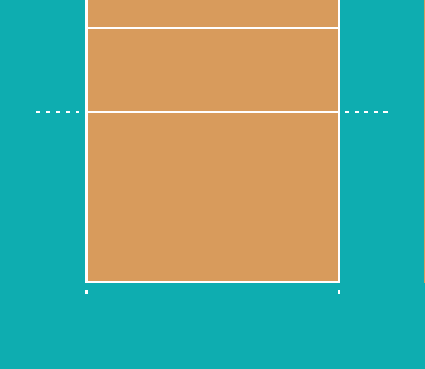

== 2019–20 Results and fixtures ==
=== Thailand League ===
==== First leg ====
date	list	Field	province	rival	Result
12 December 2020	Thailand League 2020-21	(Thailand) Nimitbut Sport Center	Bangkok	Khonkaen Star VC	0-3 loss
20 December 2020	Thailand League 2020-21	(Thailand) Nimitbut Sport Center	Bangkok	Diamond Food	3-2 win
27 December 2020	Thailand League 2020-21	(Thailand) Nimitbut Sport Center	Bangkok	Samut Prakan VC	3-0 win
14 February 2021	Thailand League 2020-21	(Thailand) MCC Hall The Mall Ngamwongwan	Nonthaburi	Rangsit University	
17 February 2021	Thailand League 2020-21	(Thailand) MCC Hall The Mall Ngamwongwan	Nonthaburi	Supreme Chonburi	
20 February 2021	Thailand League 2020-21	(Thailand) MCC Hall The Mall Ngamwongwan	Nonthaburi	Nakhon Ratchasima The Mall VC	
27 February 2021	Thailand League 2020-21	(Thailand) MCC Hall The Mall Ngamwongwan	Nonthaburi	Proflex VC	

== Imports ==
Season	No.	Name	Position	Country	Competing shows			
Season	No.	Name	Position	Country	Thailand League		Thai-Denmark Super League	
Season	No.	Name	Position	Country	leg 1	leg 2	Thai-Denmark Super League	
2013–14	21	Eva Chantava	Outside Hitter	Greece	–		✔	
2013–14	20	Meryem Çalık	Outside Hitter	Turkey	–		✔	
2014–15	18	Lindsay Stalzer	Outside Hitter	United States	–	✔		
2014–15	19	Fatou Diouck	Opposite	Senegal	–		✔	
2015–16	10	Chloe Mann	Middle Blocker	United States	✔			
2015–16	13	Therese McNatt	Outside Hitter	United States	✔	–		
2016–17	9	Alyssa Valdez	Outside Hitter	Philippines	–	✔		
2018–19	9	Yeung Sau Mei	Middle Blocker	Hong Kong	✔			
2019–20	5	Alexandra Garcia	Middle Blocker	Colombia	✔		–	
2019–20	15	Caroline Godoi	Middle Blocker	Brazil	✔		–	
2020–21	7	Nizeva Evgeniia	Outside Hitter	Russia	✔			
2021–22	23	Đinh Thị Trà Giang	Middle Blocker	Vietnam	✔			–

== Head coach ==
Season	Name
2011–Present	(Thailand) Thanakit Inleang

== Team Captain ==
- (Thailand) Jutarat Montripila (2011–2013)
- (Thailand) Malika Kanthong (2013–2015)
- (United States) Lindsay Stalzer (2015)
- (Thailand) Narumon Khanan (2015–2016)
- (Thailand) Tichaya Boonlert (2016–2017)
- (Thailand) Narumon Khanan (2017–2020)
- (Thailand) Kuttika Kaewpin (2020–present)

== Notable players ==
Domestic Players

Thailand

- Kamonporn Sukmak
- Pornpun Guedpard
- Jutarat Montripila
- Surasawadee Boonyuen
- Wanna Buakaew
- Karina Krause
- Malika Kanthong
- Kullapa Piampongsan
- Amporn Hyapha
- Chatchu-on Moksri
- Bang-on Wannaprapa
- Natthanicha Jaisaen
- Paweenut Reungram
- Kanjana Kuthaisong
- Jantana Chanchat
- Rujiraporn Pawanna
- Narumon Khanan
- Pimpichaya Kokram

Foreign Players

Vietnam

- Đinh Thi Tra Giang

United States

- Chloe Mann
- Lindsay Stalzer
- Therese McNatt

Turkey

- Meryem Çalık

Senegal

- Fatou Diouck

Greece

- Eva Chantava

Philippines

- Alyssa Valdez

Hong Kong

- Yeung Sau Mei

Colombia

- Alexandra Garcia

Brazil

- Caroline Godoi

Russia

- Nizeva Evgeniia
