= Diamond Food Volleyball Club =

Thai volleyball team

Diamond Food-Fine Chef Sport Club
- Full name: Diamond Food-Fine Chef Sport Club
- Short name: Diamond; Diamond Food
- Founded: 2019
- Ground: Chandrubeksa Stadium; Don Mueang District, Bangkok, Thailand (Capacity: 4,000)
- Chairman: (Thailand) Dacha Suwarak
- Head coach: (Thailand) Kittikun Sriutthawong
- Captain: (Thailand) Nootsara Tomkom
- League: Thailand League
- 2023–24: 2nd place

Uniforms
Home	Away

Diamond Food-Fine Chef Sport Club is a women's professional volleyball team based in Bangkok, Thailand. The club was founded in 2019 and plays in the Thailand league.

== Honours ==
=== Domestic competitions ===
- Women's Volleyball Thailand League
  - Champion : 2020–21, 2021–22
  - Runner-up (2): 2022–23, 2023–24
- Women's Volleyball Pro Challenge
  - Champion : 2019

== Former names ==
- Diamond Food Volleyball Club (2019–2021)
- Diamond Food-Fine Chef Sport Club (2021–Present)

== Team colors ==
Pro Challenge

- (2019)

Thailand League

- (2019–present)

== League results ==
League		Position	Teams	Matches	Win	Lose
Thailand League	2019–20	5	8	13	8	5
Thailand League	2020–21	Champion	8	18	16	2
Thailand League	2021–22	Champion	8	17	15	2
Thailand League	2022–23	Runner-up	8	17	16	1
Thailand League	2023–24	Runner-up	8	17	15	2

== Team roster 2021–22 ==
No.	Player	Position	Date of birth	Height (m)
7	(Thailand) Naphat Rueangdet	Setter	9 December 2003 (age 22)	1.69
13	(Thailand) Nootsara Tomkom	Setter	7 July 1985 (age 40)	1.69
17	(Thailand) Gullapa Piampongsan	Setter	17 March 1991 (age 34)	1.78
24	(Thailand) Natthanicha Jaisaen	Setter	21 April 1998 (age 27)	1.72
1	(Thailand) Wiranyupa Inchan	Opposite	23 April 2002 (age 23)	1.82
19	(Thailand) Thanacha Sooksod	Opposite	6 May 2000 (age 25)	1.80
18	(Cuba) Liannes Castañeda Simon	Opposite	18 October 1986 (age 39)	1.86
3	(Thailand) Pinyada Tohpo	Outside Hitter	18 October 2004 (age 21)	1.71
10	(Thailand) Nannaphat Moonjakham	Outside Hitter	25 October 2004 (age 21)	1.73
11	(Thailand) Sasipaporn Janthawisut	Outside Hitter	10 June 1997 (age 28)	1.78
14	(Brazil) Fernanda Davis Tomé	Outside Hitter	10 December 1989 (age 36)	1.95
15	(Thailand) Kanjana Kuthaisong	Outside Hitter	14 April 1997 (age 28)	1.70
8	(Thailand) Kaewkalaya Kamulthala	Middle Blocker	7 July 1994 (age 31)	1.79
9	(Thailand) Sasiwimol Sangpan	Middle Blocker	27 January 1995 (age 31)	1.76
12	(Thailand) Supattra Kaewpanya	Middle Blocker	19 August 2002 (age 23)	1.76
23	(Thailand) Samatchaya Langbuppha	Middle Blocker	18 November 1999 (age 26)	1.80
2	(Thailand) Tikamporn Changkeaw	Libero	12 December 1984 (age 41)	1.68
16	(Thailand) Narissara Kaewma	Libero	1 April 1996 (age 29)	1.58
22	(Thailand) Aurairat Laolaem	Libero	4 July 1999 (age 26)	1.69

=== Team staff ===
As of September 2020

Name	Position	Country
Dacha Suwarak	Chairman	Thailand
Orawan Panthong	Team Manager	Thailand
Kittikun Sriutthawong	Head Coach	Thailand
Wanna Buakaew	Assistant Coach	Thailand
Saymai Paladsrichuay	Assistant Coach	Thailand
Phattharapong Sripon	Assistant Coach	Thailand
Teerasak Nakprasong	Assistant Coach	Thailand

== Sponsors ==
- Diamond Food - Fine Chef
- Grand Sport
- Rock Tape
- Hi Power Shot
- Big Gym Bangkok

== 2021-22 results and fixtures ==
=== Thailand League ===
==== First leg ====
date	list	Field	province	rival	Result
8 December 2021	Thailand League 2021–22	(Thailand) MCC Hall The Mall Bangkapi	Bangkok	Nakhonn Ratchasrima QminC VC	3-1 win
22 December 2021	Thailand League 2021–22	(Thailand) MCC Hall The Mall Bangkapi	Bangkok	Supreme Chonburi E-Tech	0-3 loss
28 December 2021	Thailand League 2021–22	(Thailand) MCC Hall The Mall Bangkapi	Bangkok	Khonkaenstar VC	3-0 win
9 January 2022	Thailand League 2021–22	(Thailand) Nimibutr Stadium	Bangkok	Nakornnont	3-0 win
16 January 2022	Thailand League 2021–22	(Thailand) Nimibutr Stadium	Bangkok	Black Power VC	3-0 win
19 January 2022	Thailand League 2021–22	(Thailand) Nimibutr Stadium	Bangkok	Proflex RSU VC	3-0 win
23 January 2022	Thailand League 2021–22	(Thailand) Nimibutr Stadium	Bangkok	Kasetsart VC	3-0 win

==== Second leg ====
date	list	Field	province	rival	Result
29 January 2022	Thailand League 2021–22	(Thailand) Nimibutr Stadium	Bangkok	Nakornnont	3-0 win
5 February 2022	Thailand League 2021–22	(Thailand) Nimibutr Stadium	Bangkok	Proflex RSU VC	3-0 win
9 February 2022	Thailand League 2021–22	(Thailand) Nimibutr Stadium	Bangkok	Nakhonn Ratchasrima QminC VC	3-0 win
13 February 2022	Thailand League 2021–22	(Thailand) Nimibutr Stadium	Bangkok	Supreme Chonburi E-Tech	1-3 loss
20 February 2022	Thailand League 2021–22	(Thailand) Nimibutr Stadium	Bangkok	Khonkaenstar VC	3-0 win

== Head coach ==
Years	Name	Country
2019–2020	Wanna Buakaew	Thailand
2020–2021	Danai Sriwatcharamethakul	Thailand
2021–Present	Kittikun Sriutthawong	Thailand

== Team captains ==
Years	Name	Country
2019–2022	Onuma Sittirak	Thailand
2022–Present	Nootsara Tomkom	Thailand

== Imports ==
Season	No.	Name	Position	Country	Competing shows		
Season	No.	Name	Position	Country	Thailand League		Thai-Denmark Super League
Season	No.	Name	Position	Country	leg 1	leg 2	Thai-Denmark Super League
2019–20	14	Tiana Dockery	Opposite	United States	✔	–	–
2019–20	23	Zheng Yixin	Middle Blocker	China	–	✔	–
2019–20	24	Du Qing Qing	Opposite	China	–	✔	–
2021-22	14	Fernanda Davis Tomé	Outside Hitter	Brazil	✔		–
2021-22	18	Liannes Castañeda Simon	Opposite	Cuba	✔		–

== Notable players ==
Domestic Players

Thailand

- Napat Muekkhuntod
- Pannapa Chanphuk
- Sasitorn Pimpa
- Alisa Sengsane
- Jureerat Saeaung
- Suwaphitch Suwannasing
- Chatsuda Nilapa
- Anisa Yotpinit
- Duenpen Areelue
- Onuma Sittirak
- Jarasporn Bundasak
- Hattaya Bamrungsuk
- Nootsara Tomkom
- Malika Kanthong
- Kaewkalaya Kamulthala

Foreigner Players

United States

- Tiana Dockery

China

- Zheng Yixin
- Du Qing Qing

Brazil

- Fernanda Tomé

Cuba

- Liannes Castañeda Simon

Peru

- Carla Rueda Cotito
