= Rangsit University Volleyball Club =

Thai volleyball club

Rangsit University VC
- Full name: Rangsit University Volleyball Club
- Nickname: RSU VC
- Founded: 2016
- Ground: Rangsit University Gymnasium; Pathum Thani, Thailand (Capacity: 4,000)
- Chairman: (Thailand) Chanchai Suksuwan
- Manager: (Thailand) Suwat Jeerapan
- League: Thailand League
- 2020-21: 7th place
- Website: Club home page

Uniforms
Home	Away

Rangsit University Volleyball Club is a professional volleyball team based in Pathum Thani, Thailand. The club was founded in 2016 and plays in the Thailand league.

== Honours ==
=== Domestic competitions ===
- Women's Volleyball Pro Challenge
  - Champion (1): 2016
  - Runner-up (3): 2017, 2018, 2019

== Former names ==
- Rangsit University VC (2016–present)

== League results ==
League		Position	Teams	Matches	Win	Lose
Thailand League	2016-17	8	8	14	0	14
Thailand League	2017-18	7	8	14	2	12
Thailand League	2018-19	8	8	14	0	14
Thailand League	2019-20	7	8	13	2	11
Thailand League	2020-21	7	8	7	1	6

== Team roster 2019–20 ==
As of February 2020

- Head coach : (Thailand) Suwat Jeerapan

No.	Player	Position	Date of birth	Height (m)	Country
2	Pakanan Wanpen	Middle blocker	22 January 2001 (age 25)	1.79	Thailand
3	Somjai Srimunla	Setter	14 March 2001 (age 25)	1.60	Thailand
5	Nattakan Hedthong	Libero	22 March 1998 (age 28)	1.64	Thailand
6	Chutimon Sagorn	Opposite	2 October 1998 (age 27)	1.71	Thailand
7	Samatchaya Langbuppha	Middle blocker	18 December 1999 (age 26)	1.80	Thailand
9	Paweenut Rueangrum	Middle blocker	25 August 1998 (age 28)	1.81	Thailand
11	Ruchisaya Kansattru	Libero	12 September 2000 (age 25)	1.61	Thailand
12	Kullporn Kaewrodwai	Outside hitter	10 October 2001 (age 24)	1.67	Thailand
13	Kanjana Kuthaisong	Outside hitter	14 April 1997 (age 29)	1.70	Thailand
14	Chiranan Kiaokao	Middle blocker	31 July 1998 (age 28)	1.73	Thailand
15	Sutina Pasang	Opposite	28 October 1999 (age 26)	1.68	Thailand
16	Warisa Yimyai	Opposite	22 September 1999 (age 26)	1.68	Thailand
17	Siriporn Jaided	Middle blocker	2 February 1997 (age 29)	1.75	Thailand
18	Chompunuch Chitsabai	Opposite	23 September 1999 (age 26)	1.76	Thailand
19	Pattrathip Santakoon (c)	Setter	17 June 1996 (age 30)	1.67	Thailand
20	Prapatsorn Kongudom	Outside hitter	20 July 2000 (age 26)	1.68	Thailand
22	Yuwalee Choksamai	Setter	22 April 2000 (age 26)	1.68	Thailand
23	Arisa Promnok	Outside hitter	9 October 1997 (age 28)	1.68	Thailand
24	Kultida Hamontree	Libero	24 May 2000 (age 26)	1.65	Thailand

== Head coach ==
Years	Name
2018–2019	(Thailand) Phattaranat Deema
2019–Present	(Thailand) Suwat Jeerapan

== Imports ==
Season	Number	Player	Country
2017-18	13	Yeung Sau Mei	Hong Kong

== Notable players ==
Domestic Players

Thailand

- Pattiya Juangjan
- Jutarat Montripila
- Irada Poldon

Foreign players

Hong Kong

Yeung Sau Mei
