= 2009 FIVB World Grand Prix squads =

This article show all participating team squads at the 2009 FIVB Women's Volleyball World Grand Prix, played by twelve countries with the final round held in Tokyo, Japan.

== Brazil ==
The following is the Brazil roster in the 2009 FIVB World Grand Prix.

- Head Coach: José Roberto Guimarães

#	Name	Date of Birth	Height	Weight	Spike	Block	Club
1	Fabiana Claudino	24 January 1985	193 cm (6 ft 4 in)	76 kg (168 lb)	314 cm (10 ft 4 in)	293 cm (9 ft 7 in)	SESI - SP
2	Ana Tiemi	26 October 1987	187 cm (6 ft 2 in)	74 kg (163 lb)	295 cm (9 ft 8 in)	284 cm (9 ft 4 in)	Bursa B.B. SK
3	Danielle Lins	5 January 1985	181 cm (5 ft 11 in)	68 kg (150 lb)	290 cm (9 ft 6 in)	276 cm (9 ft 1 in)	Molico/Nestlé
4	Paula Pequeno	22 January 1982	184 cm (6 ft 0 in)	74 kg (163 lb)	302 cm (9 ft 11 in)	285 cm (9 ft 4 in)	FENERBAHCE
5	Caroline Gattaz	27 July 1981	191 cm (6 ft 3 in)	87 kg (192 lb)	304 cm (10 ft 0 in)	280 cm (9 ft 2 in)	UNILEVER
6	Thaisa Menezes	15 May 1987	196 cm (6 ft 5 in)	79 kg (174 lb)	316 cm (10 ft 4 in)	301 cm (9 ft 11 in)	Molico/Nestlé
7	Marianne Steinbrecher	23 August 1983	188 cm (6 ft 2 in)	70 kg (150 lb)	310 cm (10 ft 2 in)	290 cm (9 ft 6 in)	FENERBAHCE
8	Adenizia da Silva	18 December 1986	185 cm (6 ft 1 in)	63 kg (139 lb)	312 cm (10 ft 3 in)	290 cm (9 ft 6 in)	Molico/Nestlé
9	Natalia Pereira	4 April 1989	183 cm (6 ft 0 in)	76 kg (168 lb)	300 cm (9 ft 10 in)	288 cm (9 ft 5 in)	Rexona-Ades
10	Welissa Gonzaga	9 September 1982	179 cm (5 ft 10 in)	76 kg (168 lb)	300 cm (9 ft 10 in)	287 cm (9 ft 5 in)	Dentil Praia Clube
11	Joyce Silva	13 June 1984	190 cm (6 ft 3 in)	67 kg (148 lb)	311 cm (10 ft 2 in)	294 cm (9 ft 8 in)	KGC Pro Volleyball Club-KO
12	Jaqueline Carvalho	31 December 1983	186 cm (6 ft 1 in)	70 kg (150 lb)	302 cm (9 ft 11 in)	286 cm (9 ft 5 in)	Minas Tênis Clube
13	Sheilla Castro	1 July 1983	185 cm (6 ft 1 in)	64 kg (141 lb)	302 cm (9 ft 11 in)	284 cm (9 ft 4 in)	Vakifbank
14	Fabiana Oliveira	7 March 1980	169 cm (5 ft 7 in)	59 kg (130 lb)	276 cm (9 ft 1 in)	266 cm (8 ft 9 in)	Unilever Volei
15	Regiane Bidias	2 October 1986	189 cm (6 ft 2 in)	74 kg (163 lb)	304 cm (10 ft 0 in)	286 cm (9 ft 5 in)	Unilever Volei
16	Fernanda Ferreira	10 January 1980	173 cm (5 ft 8 in)	64 kg (141 lb)	283 cm (9 ft 3 in)	264 cm (8 ft 8 in)	Iqtisadchi Baku
17	Fabiola de Sousa	3 February 1983	184 cm (6 ft 0 in)	70 kg (150 lb)	300 cm (9 ft 10 in)	285 cm (9 ft 4 in)	Dinamo Krasnodar
18	Camila Brait	28 October 1988	170 cm (5 ft 7 in)	58 kg (128 lb)	271 cm (8 ft 11 in)	256 cm (8 ft 5 in)	Molico/Nestlé
19	Fernanda Rodrigues	10 May 1986	179 cm (5 ft 10 in)	74 kg (163 lb)	308 cm (10 ft 1 in)	288 cm (9 ft 5 in)	Dinamo Krasnodar

== China ==
The following is the China roster in the 2009 FIVB World Grand Prix.

#	Name	Date of Birth	Height	Weight	Spike	Block	Club
1	Li Juan	15 May 1981	187 cm (6 ft 2 in)	72 kg (159 lb)	315 cm (10 ft 4 in)	305 cm (10 ft 0 in)	Tianjin
2	Xue Ming	23 February 1987	193 cm (6 ft 4 in)	72 kg (159 lb)	324 cm (10 ft 8 in)	315 cm (10 ft 4 in)	Beijing
3	Luo Yu	27 February 1987	190 cm (6 ft 3 in)	75 kg (165 lb)	310 cm (10 ft 2 in)	300 cm (9 ft 10 in)	Zhejiang
4	Xu Yunli	2 August 1987	196 cm (6 ft 5 in)	75 kg (165 lb)	317 cm (10 ft 5 in)	315 cm (10 ft 4 in)	Fujian
5	Ma Yunwen	19 October 1986	189 cm (6 ft 2 in)	76 kg (168 lb)	315 cm (10 ft 4 in)	312 cm (10 ft 3 in)	Shanghai
6	Chu Jinling	29 July 1984	190 cm (6 ft 3 in)	72 kg (159 lb)	310 cm (10 ft 2 in)	302 cm (9 ft 11 in)	Liaoning
7	Zhang Xian	16 March 1985	168 cm (5 ft 6 in)	57 kg (126 lb)	290 cm (9 ft 6 in)	280 cm (9 ft 2 in)	Guangdong Evergrande
8	Hui Ruoqi	4 March 1991	189 cm (6 ft 2 in)	70 kg (150 lb)	312 cm (10 ft 3 in)	305 cm (10 ft 0 in)	Jiangsu
9	Zhao Yanni	23 October 1988	187 cm (6 ft 2 in)	70 kg (150 lb)	310 cm (10 ft 2 in)	305 cm (10 ft 0 in)	Sichuan
10	Wang Yimei	11 January 1988	190 cm (6 ft 3 in)	87 kg (192 lb)	318 cm (10 ft 5 in)	305 cm (10 ft 0 in)	Liaoning
11	Wei Qiuyue	26 September 1988	182 cm (6 ft 0 in)	65 kg (143 lb)	305 cm (10 ft 0 in)	300 cm (9 ft 10 in)	Tianjin
12	Yin Na	3 February 1988	182 cm (6 ft 0 in)	65 kg (143 lb)	305 cm (10 ft 0 in)	300 cm (9 ft 10 in)	Tianjin
13	Huo Xuan	27 January 1988	190 cm (6 ft 3 in)	68 kg (150 lb)	312 cm (10 ft 3 in)	305 cm (10 ft 0 in)	Henan
14	Wang Chen	29 October 1990	182 cm (6 ft 0 in)	70 kg (150 lb)	312 cm (10 ft 3 in)	302 cm (9 ft 11 in)	Sichuan
15	Yin Meng	11 January 1984	190 cm (6 ft 3 in)	76 kg (168 lb)	320 cm (10 ft 6 in)	318 cm (10 ft 5 in)	Hebei
16	Wang Qian	14 March 1989	174 cm (5 ft 9 in)	65 kg (143 lb)	305 cm (10 ft 0 in)	295 cm (9 ft 8 in)	Tianjin
17	Zeng Chunlei	3 November 1989	187 cm (6 ft 2 in)	67 kg (148 lb)	315 cm (10 ft 4 in)	315 cm (10 ft 4 in)	Beijing
18	Shen Jingsi	3 May 1989	185 cm (6 ft 1 in)	78 kg (172 lb)	305 cm (10 ft 0 in)	300 cm (9 ft 10 in)	Army

== Dominican Republic ==
The following is the Dominican Republic roster in the 2009 FIVB World Grand Prix.

- Head Coach: Marcos Kwiek

#	Name	Date of Birth	Height	Weight	Spike	Block	Club
1	Annerys Victoria Vargas Valdez	7 August 1981	196 cm (6 ft 5 in)	70 kg (150 lb)	327 cm (10 ft 9 in)	320 cm (10 ft 6 in)	Seleccion Nacional
2	Rossy Dahiana Burgos Herrera	7 April 1985	184 cm (6 ft 0 in)	70 kg (150 lb)	305 cm (10 ft 0 in)	300 cm (9 ft 10 in)	Seleccion Nacional
3	Lisvel Elisa Eve Mejia	10 September 1991	194 cm (6 ft 4 in)	70 kg (150 lb)	325 cm (10 ft 8 in)	315 cm (10 ft 4 in)	Mirador
4	Marianne Fersola Norberto	16 January 1992	191 cm (6 ft 3 in)	60 kg (130 lb)	315 cm (10 ft 4 in)	310 cm (10 ft 2 in)	Mirador
5	Brenda Castillo	5 June 1992	167 cm (5 ft 6 in)	55 kg (121 lb)	245 cm (8 ft 0 in)	230 cm (7 ft 7 in)	San Cristobal
6	Carmen Rosa Caso Sierra	29 November 1981	168 cm (5 ft 6 in)	59 kg (130 lb)	240 cm (7 ft 10 in)	230 cm (7 ft 7 in)	Mirador
7	Niverka Dharlenis Marte Frica	19 October 1990	178 cm (5 ft 10 in)	71 kg (157 lb)	295 cm (9 ft 8 in)	283 cm (9 ft 3 in)	Deportivo Nacional
8	Candida Estefany Arias Perez	11 March 1992	194 cm (6 ft 4 in)	68 kg (150 lb)	320 cm (10 ft 6 in)	315 cm (10 ft 4 in)	San Cristobal
9	Nuris Arias Doñe	20 May 1973	190 cm (6 ft 3 in)	78 kg (172 lb)	315 cm (10 ft 4 in)	306 cm (10 ft 0 in)	Mirador
10	Milagros Cabral De La Cruz	17 October 1978	182 cm (6 ft 0 in)	63 kg (139 lb)	325 cm (10 ft 8 in)	320 cm (10 ft 6 in)	Los Cachorros
11	Jeoselyna Rodriguez Santos	9 December 1991	187 cm (6 ft 2 in)	63 kg (139 lb)	325 cm (10 ft 8 in)	315 cm (10 ft 4 in)	Mirador
12	Karla Miguelina Echenique Medina	16 May 1986	181 cm (5 ft 11 in)	62 kg (137 lb)	279 cm (9 ft 2 in)	300 cm (9 ft 10 in)	Mirador
13	Cindy Carolina Rondon Martinez	12 November 1987	186 cm (6 ft 1 in)	61 kg (134 lb)	320 cm (10 ft 6 in)	315 cm (10 ft 4 in)	Seleccion Nacional
14	Prisilla Altagracia Rivera Brens	29 December 1984	186 cm (6 ft 1 in)	70 kg (150 lb)	320 cm (10 ft 6 in)	315 cm (10 ft 4 in)	San Pedro
15	Camil Inmaculada Dominguez Martinez	7 December 1991	176 cm (5 ft 9 in)	75 kg (165 lb)	232 cm (7 ft 7 in)	275 cm (9 ft 0 in)	Mirador
16	Marifranchi Rodriguez	29 August 1990	184 cm (6 ft 0 in)	68 kg (150 lb)	310 cm (10 ft 2 in)	300 cm (9 ft 10 in)	Mirador
17	Gina Altagracia Mambru Casilla	21 January 1986	182 cm (6 ft 0 in)	65 kg (143 lb)	330 cm (10 ft 10 in)	315 cm (10 ft 4 in)	Los Cachorros
18	Bethania De La Cruz De Peña	13 May 1987	188 cm (6 ft 2 in)	70 kg (150 lb)	330 cm (10 ft 10 in)	320 cm (10 ft 6 in)	Deportivo Nacional
19	Ana Yorkira Binet Stephens	9 February 1992	174 cm (5 ft 9 in)	58 kg (128 lb)	280 cm (9 ft 2 in)	260 cm (8 ft 6 in)	Samana

== Germany ==
The following is the Germany roster in the 2009 FIVB World Grand Prix.

#	Name	Date of Birth	Height	Weight	Spike	Block	Club
1	Lenka Dürr	10 December 1990	171 cm (5 ft 7 in)	59 kg (130 lb)	280 cm (9 ft 2 in)	270 cm (8 ft 10 in)	Azeryol Baku
2	Kathleen Weiß	2 February 1984	171 cm (5 ft 7 in)	66 kg (146 lb)	290 cm (9 ft 6 in)	273 cm (8 ft 11 in)	Agel Prostejov
3	Denise Hanke	31 August 1989	179 cm (5 ft 10 in)	58 kg (128 lb)	284 cm (9 ft 4 in)	272 cm (8 ft 11 in)	Impel Wroclaw
4	Kerstin Tzscherlich	15 February 1978	179 cm (5 ft 10 in)	72 kg (159 lb)	295 cm (9 ft 8 in)	282 cm (9 ft 3 in)	Dresdner SC
5	Lisa Thomsen	20 August 1985	172 cm (5 ft 8 in)	68 kg (150 lb)	290 cm (9 ft 6 in)	285 cm (9 ft 4 in)	Lokomotiv Baku
6	Saskia Hippe	16 January 1991	185 cm (6 ft 1 in)	67 kg (148 lb)	315 cm (10 ft 4 in)	292 cm (9 ft 7 in)	Schweriner SC
7	Heike Beier	9 December 1983	184 cm (6 ft 0 in)	73 kg (161 lb)	305 cm (10 ft 0 in)	293 cm (9 ft 7 in)	BKF Aluprof Bielsko Biala
8	Nadja Schaus	8 November 1984	187 cm (6 ft 2 in)	66 kg (146 lb)	305 cm (10 ft 0 in)	295 cm (9 ft 8 in)	Sigel Pallavolo Marsala
9	Berit Kauffeldt	8 July 1990	190 cm (6 ft 3 in)	75 kg (165 lb)	311 cm (10 ft 2 in)	294 cm (9 ft 8 in)	Impel Wroclaw/POL
10	Anne Matthes	30 April 1985	182 cm (6 ft 0 in)	66 kg (146 lb)	312 cm (10 ft 3 in)	295 cm (9 ft 8 in)	Dresdner SC
11	Christiane Fürst	29 March 1985	193 cm (6 ft 4 in)	80 kg (180 lb)	323 cm (10 ft 7 in)	307 cm (10 ft 1 in)	Eczasibasi Istanbul
12	Lena Möllers	6 January 1990	188 cm (6 ft 2 in)	74 kg (163 lb)	312 cm (10 ft 3 in)	297 cm (9 ft 9 in)	Neruda Volley Bolzano
13	Sarah Petrausch	31 July 1990	187 cm (6 ft 2 in)	85 kg (187 lb)	306 cm (10 ft 0 in)	295 cm (9 ft 8 in)	Rote Raben Vilsbiburg
14	Sabrina Roß	11 April 1980	185 cm (6 ft 1 in)	68 kg (150 lb)	300 cm (9 ft 10 in)	288 cm (9 ft 5 in)	Allianz Volley Stuttgart
15	Maren Brinker	10 July 1986	184 cm (6 ft 0 in)	68 kg (150 lb)	303 cm (9 ft 11 in)	295 cm (9 ft 8 in)	Montichiari Volley
16	Margareta Kozuch	30 October 1986	187 cm (6 ft 2 in)	70 kg (150 lb)	309 cm (10 ft 2 in)	297 cm (9 ft 9 in)	RebecchiNordameccanica Piacenz
17	Anja Brandt	15 February 1990	195 cm (6 ft 5 in)	77 kg (170 lb)	310 cm (10 ft 2 in)	295 cm (9 ft 8 in)	Schweriner SC
18	Corina Ssuschke-Voigt	9 May 1983	189 cm (6 ft 2 in)	75 kg (165 lb)	310 cm (10 ft 2 in)	298 cm (9 ft 9 in)	Lokomotiv Baku
19	Anke Borowikow	13 December 1986	186 cm (6 ft 1 in)	70 kg (150 lb)	305 cm (10 ft 0 in)	295 cm (9 ft 8 in)	1. VC Wiesbaden

== Japan ==
The following is the Japan roster in the 2009 FIVB World Grand Prix.

#	Name	Date of Birth	Height	Weight	Spike	Block	Club
1	Megumi Kurihara	31 July 1984	187 cm (6 ft 2 in)	69 kg (152 lb)	308 cm (10 ft 1 in)	295 cm (9 ft 8 in)	Dynamo Kazan
2	Yuki Kawai	22 January 1990	169 cm (5 ft 7 in)	63 kg (139 lb)	280 cm (9 ft 2 in)	275 cm (9 ft 0 in)	JT Marvelous
3	Yoshie Takeshita	18 March 1978	159 cm (5 ft 3 in)	53 kg (117 lb)	280 cm (9 ft 2 in)	270 cm (8 ft 10 in)	JT Marvelous
4	Kaori Inoue	21 October 1982	182 cm (6 ft 0 in)	59 kg (130 lb)	306 cm (10 ft 0 in)	300 cm (9 ft 10 in)	Denso Airybees
5	Kazuyo Mori	21 June 1976	175 cm (5 ft 9 in)	64 kg (141 lb)	303 cm (9 ft 11 in)	291 cm (9 ft 7 in)	Okayama Seagulls
6	Yuko Sano	26 July 1979	159 cm (5 ft 3 in)	54 kg (119 lb)	260 cm (8 ft 6 in)	250 cm (8 ft 2 in)	Denso Airybees
7	Hiroko Okano	25 May 1976	167 cm (5 ft 6 in)	58 kg (128 lb)	280 cm (9 ft 2 in)	276 cm (9 ft 1 in)	OKAYAMA Seagulls
8	Yuki Ishikawa	26 April 1987	181 cm (5 ft 11 in)	68 kg (150 lb)	302 cm (9 ft 11 in)	286 cm (9 ft 5 in)	JT Marvelous
9	Mizuho Ishida	22 January 1988	174 cm (5 ft 9 in)	65 kg (143 lb)	301 cm (9 ft 11 in)	286 cm (9 ft 5 in)	Denso Airybees
10	Yuki Shoji	19 November 1981	182 cm (6 ft 0 in)	67 kg (148 lb)	315 cm (10 ft 4 in)	296 cm (9 ft 9 in)	VC Wiesbaden
11	Erika Araki	3 August 1984	186 cm (6 ft 1 in)	78 kg (172 lb)	307 cm (10 ft 1 in)	295 cm (9 ft 8 in)	Ageo Medics
12	Saori Kimura	19 August 1986	185 cm (6 ft 1 in)	65 kg (143 lb)	304 cm (10 ft 0 in)	293 cm (9 ft 7 in)	Toray Arrows
13	Maiko Kano	15 July 1988	184 cm (6 ft 0 in)	68 kg (150 lb)	305 cm (10 ft 0 in)	290 cm (9 ft 6 in)	0
14	Masami Taniguchi	17 September 1976	177 cm (5 ft 10 in)	62 kg (137 lb)	302 cm (9 ft 11 in)	292 cm (9 ft 7 in)	JT Marvelous
15	Koyomi Tominaga	1 May 1989	175 cm (5 ft 9 in)	67 kg (148 lb)	303 cm (9 ft 11 in)	285 cm (9 ft 4 in)	Pioneer Red Wings
16	Kotoe Inoue	15 February 1990	161 cm (5 ft 3 in)	55 kg (121 lb)	285 cm (9 ft 4 in)	270 cm (8 ft 10 in)	JT Marvelous
17	Mai Yamaguchi	3 July 1983	176 cm (5 ft 9 in)	62 kg (137 lb)	304 cm (10 ft 0 in)	292 cm (9 ft 7 in)	Okayama Seagulls
18	Maiko Sakashita	25 February 1985	180 cm (5 ft 11 in)	74 kg (163 lb)	302 cm (9 ft 11 in)	296 cm (9 ft 9 in)	JT Marvelous
19	Kanari Hamaguchi	29 August 1985	167 cm (5 ft 6 in)	60 kg (130 lb)	283 cm (9 ft 3 in)	269 cm (8 ft 10 in)	Toray Arrows

== South Korea ==
The following is the South Korea roster in the 2009 FIVB World Grand Prix.

#	Name	Date of Birth	Height	Weight	Spike	Block	Club
1	Kim Min-Ji	25 May 1985	187 cm (6 ft 2 in)	75 kg (165 lb)	304 cm (10 ft 0 in)	296 cm (9 ft 9 in)	GS Caltex
2	Yeum Hye-Seon	3 February 1991	177 cm (5 ft 10 in)	65 kg (143 lb)	302 cm (9 ft 11 in)	291 cm (9 ft 7 in)	Hyundai Construction
3	Lee So-La	1 September 1987	177 cm (5 ft 10 in)	62 kg (137 lb)	295 cm (9 ft 8 in)	285 cm (9 ft 4 in)	Suwon City
4	Kim Sa-Nee	21 June 1981	180 cm (5 ft 11 in)	75 kg (165 lb)	302 cm (9 ft 11 in)	292 cm (9 ft 7 in)	Heungkuk Life Insurance Co.
5	Kim Hae-Ran	16 March 1984	168 cm (5 ft 6 in)	60 kg (130 lb)	280 cm (9 ft 2 in)	270 cm (8 ft 10 in)	Korea Expressway
6	Oh Hyun-Mi	15 March 1986	175 cm (5 ft 9 in)	62 kg (137 lb)	270 cm (8 ft 10 in)	265 cm (8 ft 8 in)	GS Caltex
7	Yoon Hye-Suk	19 June 1983	174 cm (5 ft 9 in)	60 kg (130 lb)	293 cm (9 ft 7 in)	283 cm (9 ft 3 in)	Hyundai
8	Kim Hye-Jin	17 February 1989	180 cm (5 ft 11 in)	62 kg (137 lb)	284 cm (9 ft 4 in)	274 cm (9 ft 0 in)	Heungkuk Life Insurance
9	La Hea-Won	28 June 1986	184 cm (6 ft 0 in)	73 kg (161 lb)	302 cm (9 ft 11 in)	294 cm (9 ft 8 in)	GS Caltex
10	Kim Yeon-Koung	26 February 1988	192 cm (6 ft 4 in)	73 kg (161 lb)	307 cm (10 ft 1 in)	299 cm (9 ft 10 in)	FENERBAHCE
11	Ji Jung-Hee	18 March 1985	180 cm (5 ft 11 in)	65 kg (143 lb)	305 cm (10 ft 0 in)	296 cm (9 ft 9 in)	KT&G
12	Han Song-Yi	5 September 1984	186 cm (6 ft 1 in)	65 kg (143 lb)	305 cm (10 ft 0 in)	298 cm (9 ft 9 in)	GS Caltex
13	Lee Yeon-Ju	1 March 1990	180 cm (5 ft 11 in)	71 kg (157 lb)	282 cm (9 ft 3 in)	270 cm (8 ft 10 in)	KT&G
14	Yang Hyo-Jin	14 December 1989	190 cm (6 ft 3 in)	72 kg (159 lb)	287 cm (9 ft 5 in)	280 cm (9 ft 2 in)	Hyundai Construction
15	Kim Se-Young	4 June 1981	190 cm (6 ft 3 in)	73 kg (161 lb)	309 cm (10 ft 2 in)	300 cm (9 ft 10 in)	Hyundai Construction
16	Bae Yoo-Na	30 November 1989	180 cm (5 ft 11 in)	67 kg (148 lb)	303 cm (9 ft 11 in)	294 cm (9 ft 8 in)	GS Caltex
17	Lee Bo-Lam	8 August 1988	185 cm (6 ft 1 in)	75 kg (165 lb)	283 cm (9 ft 3 in)	274 cm (9 ft 0 in)	Korea Highway Corp.
18	Na Hyun-Jung	10 March 1990	163 cm (5 ft 4 in)	54 kg (119 lb)	257 cm (8 ft 5 in)	250 cm (8 ft 2 in)	GS Caltex
19	Kim Hee-Jin	29 April 1991	185 cm (6 ft 1 in)	77 kg (170 lb)	300 cm (9 ft 10 in)	295 cm (9 ft 8 in)	IBK

== Netherlands ==
The following is the Netherlands roster in the 2009 FIVB World Grand Prix.

#	Name	Date of Birth	Height	Weight	Spike	Block	Club
1	Kim Staelens	7 January 1982	182 cm (6 ft 0 in)	78 kg (172 lb)	305 cm (10 ft 0 in)	301 cm (9 ft 11 in)	Stiinta Bacau
2	Monique Wismeijer	21 October 1978	176 cm (5 ft 9 in)	77 kg (170 lb)	0 cm (0 in)	0 cm (0 in)	TVC Amstelveen
3	Francien Huurman	18 April 1975	192 cm (6 ft 4 in)	80 kg (180 lb)	313 cm (10 ft 3 in)	292 cm (9 ft 7 in)	--
4	Chaïne Staelens	7 November 1980	194 cm (6 ft 4 in)	77 kg (170 lb)	316 cm (10 ft 4 in)	299 cm (9 ft 10 in)	0
5	Robin De Kruijf	5 May 1991	192 cm (6 ft 4 in)	81 kg (179 lb)	313 cm (10 ft 3 in)	300 cm (9 ft 10 in)	VakifBank Istanbul
6	Maret Balkestein-Grothues	16 September 1988	180 cm (5 ft 11 in)	68 kg (150 lb)	304 cm (10 ft 0 in)	285 cm (9 ft 4 in)	PGE Atom
7	Elke Wijnhoven	3 January 1981	169 cm (5 ft 7 in)	64 kg (141 lb)	300 cm (9 ft 10 in)	282 cm (9 ft 3 in)	Pesaro
8	Alice Blom	7 April 1980	178 cm (5 ft 10 in)	64 kg (141 lb)	305 cm (10 ft 0 in)	280 cm (9 ft 2 in)	Iqtisadci University Baku
9	Myrthe Schoot	29 August 1988	182 cm (6 ft 0 in)	70 kg (150 lb)	298 cm (9 ft 9 in)	286 cm (9 ft 5 in)	Dresdner SC
10	Janneke Van Tienen	29 May 1979	177 cm (5 ft 10 in)	73 kg (161 lb)	294 cm (9 ft 8 in)	273 cm (8 ft 11 in)	--
11	Caroline Wensink	4 August 1984	186 cm (6 ft 1 in)	80 kg (180 lb)	309 cm (10 ft 2 in)	305 cm (10 ft 0 in)	Azerrail Baku
12	Manon Nummerdor-Flier	8 February 1984	192 cm (6 ft 4 in)	71 kg (157 lb)	315 cm (10 ft 4 in)	301 cm (9 ft 11 in)	Zhengrong Fujian
13	Anne Buijs	2 December 1991	191 cm (6 ft 3 in)	73 kg (161 lb)	317 cm (10 ft 5 in)	299 cm (9 ft 10 in)	Vakifbank Istanbul
14	Floortje Meijners	16 January 1987	190 cm (6 ft 3 in)	75 kg (165 lb)	311 cm (10 ft 2 in)	283 cm (9 ft 3 in)	La Yamamay Busto Arsizio
15	Ingrid Visser	4 June 1977	190 cm (6 ft 3 in)	74 kg (163 lb)	314 cm (10 ft 4 in)	298 cm (9 ft 9 in)	Murcia 2005
16	Debby Stam-Pilon	24 July 1984	184 cm (6 ft 0 in)	69 kg (152 lb)	303 cm (9 ft 11 in)	281 cm (9 ft 3 in)	Rocheville Le Cannet
17	Deborah van Daelen	24 March 1989	188 cm (6 ft 2 in)	70 kg (150 lb)	309 cm (10 ft 2 in)	287 cm (9 ft 5 in)	VC Weert
18	Sharon Zuidema	13 August 1990	185 cm (6 ft 1 in)	72 kg (159 lb)	0 cm (0 in)	0 cm (0 in)	TVC Amstelveen
19	Leonarda Sgroot	26 February 1986	180 cm (5 ft 11 in)	64 kg (141 lb)	0 cm (0 in)	0 cm (0 in)	AMVJ

== Poland ==
The following is the Poland roster in the 2009 FIVB World Grand Prix.

#	Name	Date of Birth	Height	Weight	Spike	Block	Club
1	Katarzyna Skowronska-Dolata	30 June 1983	189 cm (6 ft 2 in)	75 kg (165 lb)	314 cm (10 ft 4 in)	296 cm (9 ft 9 in)	Rabita Baku
2	Mariola Zenik	3 July 1982	175 cm (5 ft 9 in)	65 kg (143 lb)	300 cm (9 ft 10 in)	295 cm (9 ft 8 in)	Bank BPS Muszynianka
3	Anna Wozniakowska	2 March 1982	182 cm (6 ft 0 in)	74 kg (163 lb)	310 cm (10 ft 2 in)	289 cm (9 ft 6 in)	Calisia
4	Dorota Pykosz	22 October 1978	182 cm (6 ft 0 in)	70 kg (150 lb)	310 cm (10 ft 2 in)	290 cm (9 ft 6 in)	Muszynianka
5	Maja Tokarska	22 February 1991	194 cm (6 ft 4 in)	79 kg (174 lb)	317 cm (10 ft 5 in)	293 cm (9 ft 7 in)	Tauron MKS
6	Agnieszka Bednarek-Kasza	20 February 1986	185 cm (6 ft 1 in)	71 kg (157 lb)	310 cm (10 ft 2 in)	295 cm (9 ft 8 in)	Bank BPS Muszynianka
7	Izabela Belcik	29 November 1980	185 cm (6 ft 1 in)	65 kg (143 lb)	304 cm (10 ft 0 in)	292 cm (9 ft 7 in)	Atom Trefl
8	Dorota Swieniewicz	27 July 1972	180 cm (5 ft 11 in)	64 kg (141 lb)	315 cm (10 ft 4 in)	305 cm (10 ft 0 in)	Santeramo Sport
9	Agata Sawicka	17 January 1985	180 cm (5 ft 11 in)	64 kg (141 lb)	295 cm (9 ft 8 in)	277 cm (9 ft 1 in)	Impel
10	Klaudia Kaczorowska	20 December 1988	184 cm (6 ft 0 in)	68 kg (150 lb)	303 cm (9 ft 11 in)	281 cm (9 ft 3 in)	Atom Trefl
11	Anna Werblinska	14 May 1984	178 cm (5 ft 10 in)	66 kg (146 lb)	308 cm (10 ft 1 in)	292 cm (9 ft 7 in)	Bank BPS Muszynianka
12	Milena Radecka	18 October 1984	177 cm (5 ft 10 in)	65 kg (143 lb)	302 cm (9 ft 11 in)	295 cm (9 ft 8 in)	Azerrail
13	Paulina Maj	22 March 1987	166 cm (5 ft 5 in)	58 kg (128 lb)	277 cm (9 ft 1 in)	255 cm (8 ft 4 in)	Bank BPS Muszynianka Fakro
14	Eleonora Dziekiewicz	25 October 1978	185 cm (6 ft 1 in)	75 kg (165 lb)	307 cm (10 ft 1 in)	295 cm (9 ft 8 in)	Calisia
15	Katarzyna Gajgal	21 September 1981	190 cm (6 ft 3 in)	85 kg (187 lb)	300 cm (9 ft 10 in)	287 cm (9 ft 5 in)	Bank BPS Muszynianka
16	Aleksandra Jagielo	2 June 1980	180 cm (5 ft 11 in)	70 kg (150 lb)	308 cm (10 ft 1 in)	291 cm (9 ft 7 in)	Bank BPS Muszynianka
17	Joanna Kaczor	16 September 1984	191 cm (6 ft 3 in)	64 kg (141 lb)	305 cm (10 ft 0 in)	290 cm (9 ft 6 in)	Tauron MKS
18	Berenika Tomsia	18 March 1988	188 cm (6 ft 2 in)	72 kg (159 lb)	310 cm (10 ft 2 in)	302 cm (9 ft 11 in)	FENERBAHCE
19	Joanna Wolosz	7 April 1990	181 cm (5 ft 11 in)	65 kg (143 lb)	303 cm (9 ft 11 in)	281 cm (9 ft 3 in)	Yamamay Busto Arsizio

== Puerto Rico ==
The following is the Puerto Rico roster in the 2009 FIVB World Grand Prix.

#	Name	Date of Birth	Height	Weight	Spike	Block	Club
1	Debora Seilhamer	4 October 1985	166 cm (5 ft 5 in)	61 kg (134 lb)	245 cm (8 ft 0 in)	240 cm (7 ft 10 in)	Cataño
2	Shara Venegas	18 September 1992	173 cm (5 ft 8 in)	68 kg (150 lb)	280 cm (9 ft 2 in)	272 cm (8 ft 11 in)	Caguas
3	Vilmarie Mojica	13 August 1985	180 cm (5 ft 11 in)	63 kg (139 lb)	295 cm (9 ft 8 in)	288 cm (9 ft 5 in)	Caguas
4	Tatiana Encarnación	28 July 1985	182 cm (6 ft 0 in)	72 kg (159 lb)	300 cm (9 ft 10 in)	279 cm (9 ft 2 in)	Lancheras de Catano
5	Sarai Alvarez	3 April 1986	183 cm (6 ft 0 in)	61 kg (134 lb)	295 cm (9 ft 8 in)	286 cm (9 ft 5 in)	Mayaguez
6	Yarimar Rosa	20 June 1988	178 cm (5 ft 10 in)	62 kg (137 lb)	295 cm (9 ft 8 in)	285 cm (9 ft 4 in)	Mayaguez
7	Stephanie Enright	15 December 1990	179 cm (5 ft 10 in)	56 kg (123 lb)	300 cm (9 ft 10 in)	292 cm (9 ft 7 in)	Caguas
8	Eva Cruz	22 January 1974	182 cm (6 ft 0 in)	72 kg (159 lb)	305 cm (10 ft 0 in)	290 cm (9 ft 6 in)	Juncos
9	Aurea Cruz	10 January 1982	180 cm (5 ft 11 in)	63 kg (139 lb)	310 cm (10 ft 2 in)	290 cm (9 ft 6 in)	Carolina
10	Roselly Perez	5 January 1988	185 cm (6 ft 1 in)	58 kg (128 lb)	290 cm (9 ft 6 in)	283 cm (9 ft 3 in)	Ponce
11	Karina Ocasio	1 August 1985	192 cm (6 ft 4 in)	76 kg (168 lb)	298 cm (9 ft 9 in)	288 cm (9 ft 5 in)	Caguas
12	Ania Ruiz	11 July 1982	182 cm (6 ft 0 in)	68 kg (150 lb)	305 cm (10 ft 0 in)	284 cm (9 ft 4 in)	Bayamon
13	Yamileska Yantin Luberza	9 April 1984	187 cm (6 ft 2 in)	68 kg (150 lb)	299 cm (9 ft 10 in)	288 cm (9 ft 5 in)	Guaynabo
14	Raimariely Santos	13 April 1992	180 cm (5 ft 11 in)	68 kg (150 lb)	284 cm (9 ft 4 in)	280 cm (9 ft 2 in)	Leonas de Ponce
15	Jessica Candelario	2 November 1987	180 cm (5 ft 11 in)	76 kg (168 lb)	302 cm (9 ft 11 in)	295 cm (9 ft 8 in)	Corozal
16	Alexandra Oquendo	3 February 1984	189 cm (6 ft 2 in)	75 kg (165 lb)	297 cm (9 ft 9 in)	284 cm (9 ft 4 in)	Caguas
17	Sheila Ocasio	17 November 1982	195 cm (6 ft 5 in)	74 kg (163 lb)	310 cm (10 ft 2 in)	292 cm (9 ft 7 in)	Juncos
18	Wilnelia González	2 April 1985	183 cm (6 ft 0 in)	65 kg (143 lb)	302 cm (9 ft 11 in)	294 cm (9 ft 8 in)	Vaqueras de Bayamón
19	Laudevis Marrero	3 August 1987	179 cm (5 ft 10 in)	75 kg (165 lb)	295 cm (9 ft 8 in)	285 cm (9 ft 4 in)	Toa Baja

== Russia ==
The following is the Russia roster in the 2009 FIVB World Grand Prix.

#	Name	Date of Birth	Height	Weight	Spike	Block	Club
1	Maria Borisenko	8 March 1986	190 cm (6 ft 3 in)	80 kg (180 lb)	301 cm (9 ft 11 in)	297 cm (9 ft 9 in)	Dinamo-Kazan
2	Anna Makarova	2 April 1984	194 cm (6 ft 4 in)	86 kg (190 lb)	306 cm (10 ft 0 in)	302 cm (9 ft 11 in)	Dinamo-Krasnodar
3	Maria Zhadan	6 February 1983	178 cm (5 ft 10 in)	70 kg (150 lb)	283 cm (9 ft 3 in)	280 cm (9 ft 2 in)	Zarechie-Odintsovo
4	Elena Murtazaeva	25 August 1981	190 cm (6 ft 3 in)	73 kg (161 lb)	309 cm (10 ft 2 in)	304 cm (10 ft 0 in)	Dinamo-Krasnodar
5	Alexandra Pasynkova	14 April 1987	190 cm (6 ft 3 in)	75 kg (165 lb)	313 cm (10 ft 3 in)	305 cm (10 ft 0 in)	Dinamo Krasnodar
6	Ksenia Naumova	1 February 1990	190 cm (6 ft 3 in)	73 kg (161 lb)	305 cm (10 ft 0 in)	300 cm (9 ft 10 in)	Zarechie-Odintsovo
7	Natalya Safronova	6 February 1979	190 cm (6 ft 3 in)	77 kg (170 lb)	312 cm (10 ft 3 in)	305 cm (10 ft 0 in)	Dinamo
8	Iuliia Merkulova	17 February 1984	202 cm (6 ft 8 in)	75 kg (165 lb)	317 cm (10 ft 5 in)	308 cm (10 ft 1 in)	Dinamo Krasnodar
9	Olga Fateeva	4 May 1984	190 cm (6 ft 3 in)	72 kg (159 lb)	310 cm (10 ft 2 in)	303 cm (9 ft 11 in)	Atom
10	Iuliia Morozova	8 January 1985	192 cm (6 ft 4 in)	79 kg (174 lb)	305 cm (10 ft 0 in)	301 cm (9 ft 11 in)	Dinamo Moscow
11	Ekaterina Gamova	17 October 1980	202 cm (6 ft 8 in)	80 kg (180 lb)	321 cm (10 ft 6 in)	310 cm (10 ft 2 in)	Dinamo-Kazan
12	Marina Babeshina	26 June 1985	181 cm (5 ft 11 in)	62 kg (137 lb)	291 cm (9 ft 7 in)	289 cm (9 ft 6 in)	Uralochka-NTMK
13	Evgeniya Startseva	12 February 1989	185 cm (6 ft 1 in)	68 kg (150 lb)	294 cm (9 ft 8 in)	290 cm (9 ft 6 in)	Dinamo-Kazan
14	Ekaterina Ulanova	5 August 1986	172 cm (5 ft 8 in)	61 kg (134 lb)	298 cm (9 ft 9 in)	290 cm (9 ft 6 in)	Dinamo-Kazan
15	Tatiana Kosheleva	23 December 1988	191 cm (6 ft 3 in)	67 kg (148 lb)	315 cm (10 ft 4 in)	305 cm (10 ft 0 in)	Dinamo
16	Olga Sazhina	19 February 1986	188 cm (6 ft 2 in)	71 kg (157 lb)	297 cm (9 ft 9 in)	292 cm (9 ft 7 in)	Dinamo-Yantar
17	Yana Shcherban	6 September 1989	185 cm (6 ft 1 in)	71 kg (157 lb)	298 cm (9 ft 9 in)	294 cm (9 ft 8 in)	Dinamo-Krasnodar
18	Ekaterina Starodubova	19 October 1984	176 cm (5 ft 9 in)	65 kg (143 lb)	301 cm (9 ft 11 in)	292 cm (9 ft 7 in)	Universitet-Belogorie
19	Victoria Rusakova	23 October 1988	188 cm (6 ft 2 in)	72 kg (159 lb)	310 cm (10 ft 2 in)	305 cm (10 ft 0 in)	Uralochka-NTMK

== Thailand ==
The following is the Thailand roster in the 2009 FIVB World Grand Prix.

- Head Coach: Nataphon Srisamutnak

#	Name	Date of Birth	Height	Weight	Spike	Block	Club
1	Wanna Buakaew	2 January 1981	172 cm (5 ft 8 in)	54 kg (119 lb)	292 cm (9 ft 7 in)	277 cm (9 ft 1 in)	Idea khonkaen VC
2	Piyatida Lasungnern	23 October 1990	174 cm (5 ft 9 in)	67 kg (148 lb)	290 cm (9 ft 6 in)	280 cm (9 ft 2 in)	RBAC
3	Sontaya Keawbundit	9 February 1991	177 cm (5 ft 10 in)	68 kg (150 lb)	290 cm (9 ft 6 in)	280 cm (9 ft 2 in)	Idea Khonkaen VC
4	Siriporn Sooksen	9 February 1988	180 cm (5 ft 11 in)	66 kg (146 lb)	308 cm (10 ft 1 in)	292 cm (9 ft 7 in)	RBAC
5	Pleumjit Thinkaow	9 November 1983	180 cm (5 ft 11 in)	63 kg (139 lb)	298 cm (9 ft 9 in)	281 cm (9 ft 3 in)	Bangkok Glass VC
6	Onuma Sittirak	13 June 1986	175 cm (5 ft 9 in)	72 kg (159 lb)	304 cm (10 ft 0 in)	285 cm (9 ft 4 in)	JT Marvelous
7	Narumon Khanan	26 January 1983	180 cm (5 ft 11 in)	66 kg (146 lb)	311 cm (10 ft 2 in)	289 cm (9 ft 6 in)	RBAC
8	Utaiwan Kaensing	7 September 1988	189 cm (6 ft 2 in)	86 kg (190 lb)	310 cm (10 ft 2 in)	295 cm (9 ft 8 in)	Chang
9	Pornthip Santrong	11 August 1988	178 cm (5 ft 10 in)	60 kg (130 lb)	314 cm (10 ft 4 in)	295 cm (9 ft 8 in)	RBAC
10	Wilavan Apinyapong	6 June 1984	174 cm (5 ft 9 in)	68 kg (150 lb)	294 cm (9 ft 8 in)	282 cm (9 ft 3 in)	Nakornratchasima VC
11	Amporn Hyapha	19 May 1985	180 cm (5 ft 11 in)	70 kg (150 lb)	301 cm (9 ft 11 in)	290 cm (9 ft 6 in)	Nakhonnon VC
12	Kamonporn Sukmak	29 February 1988	174 cm (5 ft 9 in)	63 kg (139 lb)	285 cm (9 ft 4 in)	275 cm (9 ft 0 in)	Chang
13	Nootsara Tomkom	7 July 1985	169 cm (5 ft 7 in)	57 kg (126 lb)	289 cm (9 ft 6 in)	278 cm (9 ft 1 in)	Rabita Baku
14	Kittiyakorn Phansamdaeng	4 January 1988	175 cm (5 ft 9 in)	63 kg (139 lb)	294 cm (9 ft 8 in)	280 cm (9 ft 2 in)	RBAC
15	Malika Kanthong	8 January 1987	177 cm (5 ft 10 in)	63 kg (139 lb)	292 cm (9 ft 7 in)	278 cm (9 ft 1 in)	Nakhonnon-3BB VC
16	Patcharee Deesamer	3 February 1989	180 cm (5 ft 11 in)	74 kg (163 lb)	306 cm (10 ft 0 in)	293 cm (9 ft 7 in)	Chang
17	Somruk Sungpokeaw	22 February 1985	175 cm (5 ft 9 in)	64 kg (141 lb)	275 cm (9 ft 0 in)	269 cm (8 ft 10 in)	ATCC
18	Em-orn Phanusit	25 March 1988	179 cm (5 ft 10 in)	70 kg (150 lb)	302 cm (9 ft 11 in)	291 cm (9 ft 7 in)	Chang
19	Tapaphaipun Chaisri	29 November 1989	168 cm (5 ft 6 in)	60 kg (130 lb)	295 cm (9 ft 8 in)	276 cm (9 ft 1 in)	Sisaket VC

== United States ==
The following is the United States roster in the 2009 FIVB World Grand Prix.

#	Name	Date of Birth	Height	Weight	Spike	Block	Club
1	Nicole Fawcett	16 December 1986	191 cm (6 ft 3 in)	82 kg (181 lb)	310 cm (10 ft 2 in)	291 cm (9 ft 7 in)	Fujian Yango Women's VB Club
2	Elisha Thomas	20 July 1981	191 cm (6 ft 3 in)	75 kg (165 lb)	321 cm (10 ft 6 in)	299 cm (9 ft 10 in)	VK Prostejov
3	Lauren Paolini	22 August 1987	193 cm (6 ft 4 in)	73 kg (161 lb)	317 cm (10 ft 5 in)	299 cm (9 ft 10 in)	Hitachi Automotive Systems
4	Angela Mcginnis	3 November 1986	180 cm (5 ft 11 in)	72 kg (159 lb)	301 cm (9 ft 11 in)	299 cm (9 ft 10 in)	Igtisadchi Baku VC
5	Stacy Sykora	24 June 1977	176 cm (5 ft 9 in)	61 kg (134 lb)	305 cm (10 ft 0 in)	295 cm (9 ft 8 in)	Clube Desportivo Futuro
6	Nicole Davis	24 April 1982	167 cm (5 ft 6 in)	73 kg (161 lb)	284 cm (9 ft 4 in)	266 cm (8 ft 9 in)	E.S. Cannet Rocheville VB
7	Angela Forsett	6 June 1986	173 cm (5 ft 8 in)	74 kg (163 lb)	320 cm (10 ft 6 in)	315 cm (10 ft 4 in)	Sports Vereingung Schwechat
8	Cynthia Barboza	7 February 1987	183 cm (6 ft 0 in)	68 kg (150 lb)	311 cm (10 ft 2 in)	301 cm (9 ft 11 in)	ASD Universal Volley
9	Alexis Crimes	12 June 1986	191 cm (6 ft 3 in)	68 kg (150 lb)	325 cm (10 ft 8 in)	300 cm (9 ft 10 in)	BKS Stal Bielsko-Biala
10	Kristin Lynn Hildebrand	30 June 1985	185 cm (6 ft 1 in)	68 kg (150 lb)	300 cm (9 ft 10 in)	284 cm (9 ft 4 in)	Impel Volleyball S.A.
11	Jordan Larson-Burbach	16 October 1986	188 cm (6 ft 2 in)	75 kg (165 lb)	302 cm (9 ft 11 in)	295 cm (9 ft 8 in)	Eczacibasi Vitra Istanbul
12	Nancy Metcalf	12 November 1978	186 cm (6 ft 1 in)	73 kg (161 lb)	314 cm (10 ft 4 in)	292 cm (9 ft 7 in)	Lokomotiv Baku
13	Tracy Stalls	12 June 1984	193 cm (6 ft 4 in)	77 kg (170 lb)	315 cm (10 ft 4 in)	308 cm (10 ft 1 in)	Eczacibasi Sports Club
14	Heather Lee Mcguire	22 June 1986	188 cm (6 ft 2 in)	75 kg (165 lb)	308 cm (10 ft 1 in)	296 cm (9 ft 9 in)	Besiktas Volleyball Kulubu
15	Courtney Thompson	4 November 1984	170 cm (5 ft 7 in)	66 kg (146 lb)	276 cm (9 ft 1 in)	263 cm (8 ft 8 in)	Rio de Janeiro Volei Clube
16	Christa Harmotto Dietzen	12 October 1986	188 cm (6 ft 2 in)	79 kg (174 lb)	322 cm (10 ft 7 in)	300 cm (9 ft 10 in)	Fenerbahce SK
17	Mary Spicer	3 July 1987	175 cm (5 ft 9 in)	65 kg (143 lb)	292 cm (9 ft 7 in)	280 cm (9 ft 2 in)	Rabita Baku
18	Foluke Akinradewo	5 October 1987	191 cm (6 ft 3 in)	79 kg (174 lb)	331 cm (10 ft 10 in)	300 cm (9 ft 10 in)	Volero Zurich
19	Jane Collymore	30 September 1984	182 cm (6 ft 0 in)	68 kg (150 lb)	310 cm (10 ft 2 in)	305 cm (10 ft 0 in)	San Sebastian
