= 2019 Korea–Thailand Pro Volleyball All-Star Super Match =

Tournament details
- Host country: Thailand
- Dates: 5 – 7 April 2019
- Teams: Thailand; Korea Republic
- Venues: 2 (in 2 host cities)

Tournament statistics
- Matches played: 2

The 2019 Korea–Thailand Pro Volleyball All-Star Super Match presented by Mitsubishi Xpander will be the 3rd staging of the Korea–Thailand Pro Volleyball All-Star Super Match, the annual friendly tournament between Thailand women's national volleyball team and Korea Republic women's national volleyball team. The first match will be held on 5 April 2019 in Nakhon Ratchasima and the second one will be held on 7 April 2019 in Bangkok.

== Background ==
Thailand and Korea Head to head
Tournament	Round	Venue	Date	Result
2018 FIVB Volleyball Women's Nations League	Preliminary round – Pool 15	Nakhon Ratchasima, Thailand	5 June	(South Korea) won 3–1
2018 Asian Games	Semifinals	Jakarta, Indonesia	31 August	(Thailand) won 3–1
2018 FIVB Volleyball Women's World Championship	Preliminary round – Pool C	Kobe, Japan	29 September	(Thailand) won 3–2

== Squads ==
OP	Opposite spiker
WS	Wing spiker
MB	Middle blocker
S	Setter
L	Libero

=== Korea All-Stars team ===
Korea All-Stars team squad
No.	Player	Position	Club team	Age	Height
–	Park Mi-hee	Coach	(South Korea) Incheon Heungkuk Life Pink Spiders	55	174 cm
1	Lee So-young	WS	(South Korea) GS Caltex Seoul KIXX	24	176 cm
2	Lee Ju-ah	MB	(South Korea) Incheon Heungkuk Life Pink Spiders	18	185 cm
3	Jeong Ji-yun	MB	(South Korea) Suwon Hyundai Engineering & Construction Hillstate	18	180 cm
4	Kim Hee-jin	OP	(South Korea) Hwaseong IBK Altos	27	186 cm
5	Kim Hae-ran	L	(South Korea) Incheon Heungkuk Life Pink Spiders	35	168 cm
6	Park Eun-jin	MB	(South Korea) Daejeon KGC	19	188 cm
7	Ko Ye-rim	WS	(South Korea) Hwaseong IBK Altos	24	177 cm
9	Oh Ji-yeong	L	(South Korea) Daejeon KGC	30	170 cm
10	Bae Yoo-na	MB	(South Korea) Gyeongbuk Gimcheon Hi-pass	29	180 cm
11	Kim Su-Ji (c)	MB	(South Korea) Hwaseong IBK Altos	31	187 cm
12	Moon Jeong-won	OP	(South Korea) Gyeongbuk Gimcheon Hi-pass	27	174 cm
13	Park Jeong-ah	WS	(South Korea) Gyeongbuk Gimcheon Hi-pass	26	187 cm
14	Cho Song-hwa	S	(South Korea) Incheon Heungkuk Life Pink Spiders	26	177 cm
15	Kang So-hwi	WS	(South Korea) GS Caltex Seoul KIXX	21	180 cm
17	Lee Jae-yeong	OP	(South Korea) Incheon Heungkuk Life Pink Spiders	22	179 cm
19	Lee Da-yeong	S	(South Korea) Suwon Hyundai Engineering & Construction Hillstate	22	179 cm

=== Thailand All-Stars team ===
Thailand All-Stars team squad
No.	Player	Position	Club team	Age	Height
–	Danai Sriwatcharamethakul	Coach	–	48	–
2	Piyanut Pannoy	L	(Thailand) Chonburi	29	171 cm
4	Thatdao Nuekjang	MB	(Thailand) Khonkaen Star	25	183 cm
5	Pleumjit Thinkaow	MB	(Thailand) Chonburi	35	180 cm
6	Onuma Sittirak	WS	(Thailand) Nakhon Ratchasima	32	175 cm
9	Wanitchaya Luangtonglang	OP	(Thailand) Nakhon Ratchasima	26	175 cm
10	Wilavan Apinyapong	WS	(Thailand) Chonburi	34	174 cm
11	Amporn Hyapha -	MB	(Thailand) Nakhon Ratchasima	33	180 cm
13	Nootsara Tomkom (c)	S	(Thailand) Nakhon Ratchasima	33	169 cm
14	Chitaporn Kamlangmak	MB	(Thailand) Khonkaen Star	22	183 cm
15	Malika Kanthong	OP	(Thailand) Nakhon Ratchasima	32	177 cm
18	Ajcharaporn Kongyot	WS	(Thailand) Chonburi	23	178 cm
21	Kullapa Piampongsan	S	(Thailand) Khonkaen Star	28	175 cm
22	Yupa Sanitklang	L	(Thailand) Nakhon Ratchasima	27	165 cm
23	Jutarat Montripila	WS	(Thailand) Nakornnont	32	175 cm

== Match 1 ==
5 April 2019; 12.10 UTC+07:00	Thailand	3–2	South Korea	Terminal21 Korat, Nakhon Ratchasima; Attendance: 4,000; Referees: Sasiprapa P. (Thailand), Choi Jae–hyo (South Korea)
5 April 2019; 12.10 UTC+07:00	(25–23, 29–27, 23–25, 23–25, 15–11); Report			Terminal21 Korat, Nakhon Ratchasima; Attendance: 4,000; Referees: Sasiprapa P. (Thailand), Choi Jae–hyo (South Korea)

Starters				Pts
1	MB	5	Pleumjit Thinkaow	8
2	WS	6	Onuma Sittirak	16
3	S	13	Nootsara Tomkom (c)	2
4	MB	14	Chitaporn Kamlangmak	2
5	WS	18	Ajcharaporn Kongyot	25
6	WS	23	Jutarat Montripila	5
Libero				Pts
1	L	2	Piyanut Pannoy	0
2	L	22	Yupa Sanitklang	0
Reserves				Pts
1	MB	4	Thatdao Nuekjang ▲	8
2	OP	9	Wanitchaya Luangtonglang ▲	8
3	WS	10	Wilavan Apinyapong ▲	9
4	MB	11	Amporn Hyapha ▲	4
5	OP	15	Malika Kanthong ▲	5
6	S	21	Kullapa Piampongsan ▲	1

Thailand	Korea

Thailand	Statistics	Korea
115	Total scores	111
69	Spiking scores	64
16	Blocking scores	12
7	Serving scores	9
23	Opp. error scores	26

Starters				Pts
1	WS	1	Lee So-young	11
2	OP	4	Kim Hee-jin	2
3	MB	11	Kim Su-Ji (c)	6
4	WS	13	Park Jeong-ah	14
5	OP	17	Lee Jae-yeong	26
6	S	19	Lee Da-yeong	4
Libero				Pts
1	L	5	Kim Hae-ran	0
2	L	9	Oh Ji-yeong	0
Reserves				Pts
1	MB	2	Lee Ju-ah ▲	2
2	MB	6	Park Eun-jin ▲	5
3	WS	7	Ko Ye-rim ▲	5
4	OP	12	Moon Jeong-won ▲	1
5	S	14	Cho Song-hwa ▲	0
6	WS	15	Kang So-hwi ▲	9

== Match 2 ==
7 April 2019; 15.30 UTC+07:00	Thailand	v	South Korea	Indoor Stadium Huamark, Bangkok

Starters				Pts
1	MB	4	Thatdao Nuekjang	
2	OP	9	Wanitchaya Luangtonglang	
3	MB	11	Amporn Hyapha	
4	S	13	Nootsara Tomkom (c)	
5	OP	15	Malika Kanthong	
6	WS	18	Ajcharaporn Kongyot	
Libero				Pts
1	L	2	Piyanut Pannoy	0
2	L	22	Yupa Sanitklang	0
Reserves				Pts
1	MB	5	Pleumjit Thinkaow ▲	
2	WS	6	Onuma Sittirak ▲	
3	WS	10	Wilavan Apinyapong ▲	
4	MB	14	Chitaporn Kamlangmak ▲	
5	S	21	Kullapa Piampongsan ▲	
6	WS	23	Jutarat Montripila ▲	

Thailand	Korea

Thailand	Statistics	Korea
	Total scores	
	Spiking scores	
	Blocking scores	
	Serving scores	
	Opp. error scores	
	Dig	
	Set	
	Reception	

Starters				Pts
1	WS	1	Lee So-young	
2	OP	4	Kim Hee-jin	
3	MB	11	Kim Su-Ji (c)	
4	WS	13	Park Jeong-ah	
5	OP	17	Lee Jae-yeong	
6	S	19	Lee Da-yeong	
Libero			Pts	
1	L	5	Kim Hae-ran	0
2	L	9	Oh Ji-yeong	0
Reserves				Pts
1	MB	2	Lee Ju-ah ▲	
2	MB	3	Jeong Ji-yun ▲	
3	WS	7	Ko Ye-rim ▲	
4	MB	10	Bae Yoo-na ▲	
5	OP	12	Moon Jeong-won ▲	
6	S	14	Cho Song-hwa ▲	
