= 2020–21 V-League (South Korea) =

V League
- Season: 2020–21
- Dates: October 2020 – April 2021

The 2020–21 V-League season was the 17th season of the V-League, the highest professional volleyball league in South Korea. The season started in October 2020. Seoul Woori Card Wibee were the first placed male team when the season was cancelled last year and Suwon Hyundai E&C Hillstate were the first placed female team.

== Teams ==
=== Men's clubs ===
Location of teams in V-League Men's Clubs

Team	Location	Stadium	Capacity
Ansan OK Financial Group Okman	Ansan	Sangnoksu Gymnasium	2,700
Cheonan Hyundai Capital Skywalkers	Cheonan	Yu Gwan-sun Gymnasium	5,482
Daejeon Samsung Bluefangs	Daejeon	Chungmu Gymnasium	5,000
Uijeongbu KB Insurance Stars	Uijeongbu	Uijeongbu Gymnasium	6,240
Incheon Korean Air Jumbos	Incheon	Gyeyang Gymnasium	4,270
Seoul Woori Card Wibee	Seoul	Jangchung Gymnasium	4,507
Suwon KEPCO Vixtorm	Suwon	Suwon Gymnasium	4,317

=== Women's clubs ===
Location of teams in V-League Women's Clubs

Team	Location	Stadium	Capacity
Daejeon KGC	Daejeon	Chungmu Gymnasium	5,000
Gimcheon Korea Expressway Hi-pass	Gimcheon	Gimcheon Gymnasium	6,000
GS Caltex Seoul KIXX	Seoul	Jangchung Gymnasium	4,507
Hwaseong IBK Altos	Hwaseong	Hwaseong Gymnasium	5,152
Incheon Heungkuk Life Pink Spiders	Incheon	Gyeyang Gymnasium	4,270
Suwon Hyundai E&C Hillstate	Suwon	Suwon Gymnasium	4,317

== Season standing procedure ==
1. Match points
2. Number of matches won
3. Sets ratio
4. Points ratio
5. Result of the last match between the tied teams
- In the men's league, if the 4th-placed team finishes within three points of the 3rd placed team, an extra league game is played between these two teams.

Match won 3–0 or 3–1: 3 match points for the winner, 0 match points for the loser
Match won 3–2: 2 match points for the winner, 1 match point for the loser

== Regular season ==
=== League table (Men's) ===
Pos	Team	Pld	W	L	Pts '	SR	SPR	Qualification
1	Incheon Korean Air Jumbos	36	26	10	76	1.736	1.087	Finals
2	Seoul Woori Card Wibee	36	23	13	67	1.500	1.044	Semi-Finals
3	Uijeongbu KB Insurance Stars	36	19	17	58	1.028	0.997	Quarterfinals
4	Ansan OKman	36	19	17	55	1.000	0.991	Quarterfinals
5	Suwon KEPCO Vixtorm	36	18	18	55	0.987	1.009	
6	Cheonan Hyundai Skywalkers	36	15	21	41	0.788	0.966	
7	Daejeon Samsung Bluefangs	36	6	30	26	0.474	0.913	

- As Ansan were within three points of Uijeongbu, a quarter final play-off game was played, with Ansan winning 3-1.

Source: League table (Men's)

=== League table (Women's) ===
Pos	Team	Pld	W	L	Pts	SR	SPR	Qualification
1	GS Caltex Seoul KIXX	30	20	10	58	1.542	1.080	Finals
2	Incheon Heungkuk Pink Spiders	30	19	11	56	1.327	1.015	Semifinals
3	Hwaseong IBK Altos	30	14	16	42	0.844	0.964	Semifinals
4	Gimcheon Hi-pass	30	13	17	41	0.906	1.018	
5	Daejeon KGC	30	13	17	39	0.857	0.971	
6	Suwon Hyundai Hillstate	30	11	19	34	0.757	0.957	

Source: League table (Women's)

=== Results / Fixtures – Male ===
==== Rounds 1 and 2 ====
Home \ Away	INC	CHN	ANS	DEJ	SEL	UJB	SUW
Incheon Korean Air Jumbos	—	3–0	2–3	3–1	3–1	1–3	3–0
Cheonan Hyundai Skywalkers	1–3	—	1–3	0–3	3–0	0–3	1–3
Ansan OKman	1–3	3–1	—	3–1	3–2	3–1	3–1
Daejeon Samsung Bluefangs	2–3	2–3	2–3	—	0–3	2–3	2–3
Seoul Woori Card Wibee	2–3	1–3	1–3	3–0	—	1–3	3–2
Uijeongbu KB Insurance Stars	3–1	3–2	3–1	3–2	0–3	—	3–1
Suwon KEPCO Vixtorm	3–1	2–3	3–0	2–3	0–3	3–2	—

Updated to match(es) played on -. Source:
Legend: Blue = home team win; Yellow = draw; Red = away team win.
- = game played at away team's ground

==== Rounds 3 and 4 ====
Home \ Away	INC	CHN	ANS	DEJ	SEL	UJB	SUW
Incheon Korean Air Jumbos	—	2–3	3–2	3–0	2–3	3–2	3–2
Cheonan Hyundai Skywalkers	1–3	—	1–3	3–0	1–3	2–3	3–2
Ansan OKman	0–3	3–2	—	3–0	0–3	1–3	3–2
Daejeon Samsung Bluefangs	1–3	0–3	2–3	—	0–3	3–0	2–3
Seoul Woori Card Wibee	3–2	2–3	3–0	3–2	—	3–0	0–3
Uijeongbu KB Insurance Stars	2–3	3–0	0–3	2–3	3–0	—	3–0
Suwon KEPCO Vixtorm	3–2	3–0	2–3	3–1	3–2	3–0	—

Updated to match(es) played on unknown. Source:
Legend: Blue = home team win; Yellow = draw; Red = away team win.

==== Rounds 5 and 6 ====
Home \ Away	INC	CHN	ANS	DEJ	SEL	UJB	SUW
Incheon Korean Air Jumbos	—	3–0	3–2	3–1	3–1*	3–0	1–3
Cheonan Hyundai Skywalkers	0–3	—	3–2	3–0	3–2	1–3	2–3
Ansan OKman	1–3	2–3	—	3–0	1–3	2–3	1–3
Daejeon Samsung Bluefangs	0–3	0–3	1–3	—	2–3	0–3	3–1
Seoul Woori Card Wibee	3–0	3–1	3–0	3–0	—	3–2	0–3
Uijeongbu KB Insurance Stars	0–3	3–1	2–3	3–2	0–3	—	1–3
Suwon KEPCO Vixtorm	0–3	0–3	3–2	2–3	2–3	3–2	—

Updated to match(es) played on unknown. Source:
Legend: Blue = home team win; Yellow = draw; Red = away team win.
- = game played at away team's ground

Source: Game Schedule (Men's) Game Schedule

=== Results / Fixtures – Female ===
==== Rounds 1 and 2 ====
Home \ Away	SEL	DEJ	HWA	INC	GIM	SUW
GS Caltex Seoul KIXX	—	1–3	3–0	1–3	3–1	3–0
Daejeon KGC	2–3	—	1–3	1–3*	0–3	3–0
Hwaseong IBK Altos	2–3	3–2	—	0–3	3–1	3–1
Incheon Heungkuk Pink Spiders	3–2*	3–1*	3–0	—	3–2	3–0
Gimcheon Hi-pass	0–3	0–3*	3–2	1–3	—	3–1
Suwon Hyundai Hillstate	3–2	3–0	1–3	1–3	3–0	—

Updated to match(es) played on - all 1st round matches completed. Source:
Legend: Blue = home team win; Yellow = draw; Red = away team win.
- = game played at away team's ground

==== Rounds 3 and 4 ====
Home \ Away	SEL	DEJ	HWA	INC	GIM	SUW
GS Caltex Seoul KIXX	—	3–1	3–1*	1–3*	3–0	3–1
Daejeon KGC	1–3	—	3–0	2–3	1–3*	3–1
Hwaseong IBK Altos	3–1	0–3	—	0–3	3–2	3–1
Incheon Heungkuk Pink Spiders	2–3	3–0*	3–0	—	0–3	3–0
Gimcheon Hi-pass	2–3	2–3	3–0	2–3	—	3–2
Suwon Hyundai Hillstate	3–1	3–0	2–3	3–2	1–3	—

Updated to match(es) played on all 2nd round matches completed. Source:
Legend: Blue = home team win; Yellow = draw; Red = away team win.
- = game played at away team's ground

==== Rounds 5 and 6 ====
Home \ Away	SEL	DEJ	HWA	INC	GIM	SUW
GS Caltex Seoul KIXX	—	3–0	2–3	3–1	3–2	3–2
Daejeon KGC	3–1	—	0–3	3–0	3–1	3–2
Hwaseong IBK Altos	0–3*	3–2	—	3–0	2–3	1–3
Incheon Heungkuk Pink Spiders	0–3	3–1	0–3	—	3–1	1–3
Gimcheon Hi-pass	0–3	2–3	3–2	3–0	—	3–0
Suwon Hyundai Hillstate	3–2	2–3	3–2	3–2	2–3	—

Updated to match(es) played on all 3rd round matches completed. Source:
Legend: Blue = home team win; Yellow = draw; Red = away team win.

Source: Game Schedule (Women's)

== Play-offs ==
=== Bracket (Men's ) ===
Semifinals
1	Incheon Korean Air Jumbos
2	Seoul Woori Card Wibee	3	3
3	Ansan OKman	1	1

Finals
1	Incheon Korean Air Jumbos	0	3	0	3	3
2	Seoul Woori Card Wibee	3	2	3	0	1

=== Bracket (Women's) ===
Semifinals
1	GS Caltex Seoul KIXX
2	Incheon Heungkuk Life Pink Spiders	3	1	3
3	Hwaseong IBK Altos	1	3	0

Finals
1	GS Caltex Seoul KIXX	3	3	3
2	Incheon Heungkuk Life Pink Spiders	0	0	2

== Attendance ==
Due to COVID restrictions, most games this season have been played behind closed doors. The games that have allowed an attendance have restricted crowds to only a few hundred.

== Top Performers ==
=== Men's (Points) ===
Rank	Player	Club	Points
1	(Mali) Noumory Keita	Uijeongbu KB Insurance Stars	1147
2	(Portugal) Alexandre Ferreira	Seoul Woori Card Wibee	903
3	(United States) Kyle Russell	Suwon KEPCO Vixtorm	898
4	(Brazil) Felipe Airton Banderò	Ansan OKman	851
5	(Uganda) Daudi Okello	Cheonan Hyundai Skywalkers	790
6	(South Korea) Jung Ji-seok	Incheon Korean Air Jumbos	632
7	(South Korea) Park Chul-woo	Suwon KEPCO Vixtorm	596
8	(South Korea) Na Kyeong-buk	Seoul Woori Card Wibee	531
9	(South Korea) Im Dong-hyeok	Incheon Korean Air Jumbos	506
10	(South Korea) Kim Jeong-ho	Uijeongbu KB Insurance Stars	481

=== Women's (Points) ===
Rank	Player	Club	Points
1	(Italy) Valentina Diouf	Daejeon KGC	963
2	(Russia) Anna Lazareva	Hwaseong IBK Altos	867
3	(United States) Merete Lutz	GS Caltex Seoul KIXX	854
4	(United States) Kelsie Payne	Gimcheon Hi-pass	756
5	(Belgium) Hélène Rousseaux	Suwon Hyundai Hillstate	667
6	(South Korea) Kim Yeon-koung	Incheon Heungkuk Pink Spiders	648
7	(South Korea) Park Jeong-ah	Gimcheon Hi-pass	486
8	(South Korea) Lee Jae-yeong	Incheon Heungkuk Pink Spiders	473
9	(South Korea) Yang Hyo-jin	Suwon Hyundai Hillstate	441
10	(South Korea) Lee So-young	GS Caltex Seoul KIXX	439

=== Men's Spike (Attack Efficiency) ===
Rank	Player	Club	Rate
1	(South Korea) Jung Ji-seok	Incheon Korean Air Jumbos	55.43%
2	(Portugal) Alexandre Ferreira	Seoul Woori Card Wibee	54.85%
3	(South Korea) Kim Jeong-ho	Uijeongbu KB Insurance Stars	54.73%
4	(South Korea) Na Gyeong-bok	Seoul Woori Card Wibee	52.81%
5	(Mali) Noumory Keita	Uijeongbu KB Insurance Stars	52.74%
6	(Uganda) Daudi Okello	Cheonan Hyundai Skywalkers	52.19%
7	(South Korea) Im Dong-hyeok	Incheon Korean Air Jumbos	51.23%
8	(Brazil) Felipe Airton Banderò	Ansan OKman	50.95%
9	(Poland) Bartosz Krzysiek	Daejeon Samsung Bluefangs	50.83%
10	(South Korea) Park Cheol-woo	Suwon KEPCO Vixtorm	48.64%

=== Women's Spike (Attack Efficiency) ===
Rank	Player	Club	Rate
1	(South Korea) Kim Yeon-koung	Incheon Heungkuk Pink Spiders	45.92%
2	(United States) Merete Lutz	GS Caltex Seoul KIXX	43.89%
3	(Russia) Anna Lazareva	Hwaseong IBK Altos	43.41%
4	(South Korea) Lee So-young	GS Caltex Seoul KIXX	41.66%
5	(Belgium) Hélène Rousseaux	Suwon Hyundai Hillstate	41.63%
6	(Italy) Valentina Diouf	Daejeon KGC	41.06%
7	(United States) Kelsie Payne	Gimcheon Hi-pass	39.79%
8	(South Korea) Lee Jae-yeong	Incheon Heungkuk Pink Spiders	39.32%
9	(South Korea) Park Jeong-ah	Gimcheon Hi-pass	35.06%
10			

=== Men's Blocking (Blocks per set) ===
Rank	Player	Club	Blocks
1	(South Korea) Shin Yung-suk	Suwon KEPCO Vixtorm	0.67
2	(South Korea) Kim Hong-jeong	Uijeongbu KB Insurance Stars	0.65
3	(South Korea) Park Sang-ha	Daejeon Samsung Bluefangs	0.64
4	(South Korea) Ha Hyun-yong	Seoul Woori Card Wibee	0.61
5	(South Korea) Choi Min-ho	Cheonan Hyundai Skywalkers	0.59
6	(South Korea) Jin Sang-heon	Ansan OKman	0.57
7	(South Korea) Park Won-bin	Ansan OKman	0.55
8	(South Korea) Jin Ji-wi	Incheon Korean Air Jumbos	0.51
9	(South Korea) Jung Ji-seok	Incheon Korean Air Jumbos	0.50
10	(South Korea) Park Jin-woo	Uijeongbu KB Insurance Stars	0.49

=== Women's Blocking (Blocks per set) ===
Rank	Player	Club	Blocks
1	(South Korea) Han Song-yi	Daejeon KGC	0.70
2	(South Korea) Jung Dae-young	Gimcheon Hi-pass	0.70
3	(South Korea) Bae Yoo-na	Gimcheon Hi-pass	0.61
4	(United States) Merete Lutz	GS Caltex Seoul KIXX	0.56
5	(South Korea) Yang Hyo-jin	Suwon Hyundai Hillstate	0.54
6	(South Korea) Kim Su-ji	Hwaseong IBK Altos	0.54
7	(Italy) Valentina Diouf	Daejeon KGC	0.53
8	(South Korea) Park Eun-jin	Daejeon KGC	0.50
9	(South Korea) Jeong Ji-yun	Suwon Hyundai Hillstate	0.50
10	(Russia) Anna Lazareva	Hwaseong IBK Altos	0.49

=== Men's Serving (Aces per set) ===
Rank	Player	Club	Aces
1	(United States) Kyle Russell	Suwon KEPCO Vixtorm	0.77
2	(South Korea) Jung Ji-seok	Incheon Korean Air Jumbos	0.54
3	(Mali) Noumory Keita	Uijeongbu KB Insurance Stars	0.52
4	(Portugal) Alexandre Ferreira	Seoul Woori Card Wibee	0.50
5	(South Korea) Heo Su-bong	Cheonan Hyundai Skywalkers	0.45
6	(South Korea) Kim Jeong-ho	Uijeongbu KB Insurance Stars	0.32
7	(Brazil) Felipe Airton Banderò	Ansan OKman	0.31
8	(South Korea) Hwang Taek-eui	Uijeongbu KB Insurance Stars	0.29
9	(South Korea) Song Myung-geun	Ansan OKman	0.27
10	(South Korea) Na Gyeong-bok	Seoul Woori Card Wibee	0.26

=== Women's Serving (Aces per set) ===
Rank	Player	Club	Aces
1	(South Korea) Kim Yeon-koung	Incheon Heungkuk Pink Spiders	0.28
2	(South Korea) Ko Ui-jeong	Daejeon KGC	0.27
3	(South Korea) Kim Mi-youn	Incheon Heungkuk Pink Spiders	0.27
4	(Russia) Anna Lazareva	Hwaseong IBK Altos	0.26
5	(South Korea) An Hye-jin	GS Caltex Seoul KIXX	0.25
6	(South Korea) Kang So-hwi	GS Caltex Seoul KIXX	0.24
7	(South Korea) Lee Jae-yeong	Incheon Heungkuk Pink Spiders	0.23
8	(United States) Merete Lutz	GS Caltex Seoul KIXX	0.23
9	(South Korea) Mun Jeong-won	Gimcheon Hi-pass	0.20
10	(South Korea) Cho Song-hwa	Hwaseong IBK Altos	0.19

== Player of the Round ==
=== Men's ===
Round	Player	Club	Source
1	(Mali) Noumory Keita	Uijeongbu KB Insurance Stars	
2	(United States) Kyle Russell	Suwon KEPCO Vixtorm	
3	(Portugal) Alexandre Ferreira	Seoul Woori Card Wibee	
4	(Uganda) Daudi Okello	Cheonan Hyundai Skywalkers	
5	(Portugal) Alexandre Ferreira	Seoul Woori Card Wibee	
6	(Cuba) Yosvany Hernandez	Incheon Korean Air Jumbos	

=== Women's ===
Round	Player	Club	Source
1	(South Korea) Kim Yeon-koung	Incheon Heungkuk Pink Spiders	
2	(United States) Merete Lutz	GS Caltex Seoul KIXX	
3	(Italy) Valentina Diouf	Daejeon KGC	
4	(South Korea) Lee Jae-yeong	Incheon Heungkuk Pink Spiders	
5	(South Korea) Lee So-young	GS Caltex Seoul KIXX	
6	(Russia) Anna Lazareva	Hwaseong IBK Altos	

== Final standing ==
=== Men's League ===
Rank	Team
1st place, gold medalist(s)	Incheon Korean Air Jumbos
2nd place, silver medalist(s)	Seoul Woori Card Wibee
3rd place, bronze medalist(s)	Ansan OKman
4	Uijeongbu KB Insurance Stars
5	Suwon KEPCO Vixtorm
6	Cheonan Hyundai Skywalkers
7	Daejeon Samsung Bluefangs

=== Women's League ===
Rank	Team
1st place, gold medalist(s)	GS Caltex Seoul KIXX
2nd place, silver medalist(s)	Incheon Heungkuk Pink Spiders
3rd place, bronze medalist(s)	Hwaseong IBK Altos
4	Gimcheon Hi-pass
5	Daejeon KGC
6	Suwon Hyundai Hillstate

== Awards ==
=== Women's Regular season ===
- Most valuable player

Kim Yeon-koung (Heungkuk Life)

- Best setter

An Hye-jin (GS Caltex)

- Best outside spikers

Kim Yeon-koung (Heungkuk Life)
Lee So-young (GS Caltex)

- Best middle blockers

Yang Hyo-jin (Hyundai Hillstate)
Han Song-yi

- Best opposite spiker

Valentina Diouf

- Best libero

Yim Myung-ok

=== Women's Finals Series ===
- Most valuable player

Lee So-young (GS Caltex)
Merete Lutz (GS Caltex)

=== Men's Regular season ===
- Most valuable player

Jung Ji-seok

- Best setter

Hwang Taek-eui

- Best outside spikers

Jung Ji-seok
Alexandre Ferreira

- Best middle blockers

Shin Yung-suk
Ha Hyeon-yong

- Best opposite spiker

Noumory Keita

- Best libero

Oh Jae-seong

=== Men's Finals Series ===
- Most valuable player

Jung Ji-seok
