= Korea–Thailand Pro Volleyball All-Star Super Match =

Volleyball exhibition game

Korea-Thailand All-Star Super Match 한국-태국 올스타 슈퍼매치 เกาหลี–ไทย ออลสตาร์ซูเปอร์แมตช์
- Other names: Korea–Thailand Friendly Match
- Location: South Korea and Thailand
- Teams: South Korea and Thailand
- First meeting: 3 June 2017
- Latest meeting: Thailand 3–2 South Korea; 2018 Korea–Thailand All-Star Super Match (8 April 2018)
- Next meeting: South Korea v Thailand; 2019 Korea–Thailand All-Star Super Match
- Broadcasters: KBS, SMMTV, Channel 3 HD

Statistics
- Most wins: South Korea (1); Thailand (1)

The Korea–Thailand Pro Volleyball All-Star Super Match (Korean: 한국-태국 여자배구 올스타 슈퍼매치; Thai: เกาหลี–ไทย โปรวอลเลย์บอลออลสตาร์ซูเปอร์แมตช์) is a volleyball exhibition game hosted every year by the Korea Volleyball Association (KVA), Korea Volleyball Federation (KOVO) and Thailand Volleyball Association (TVA), matching a mix of the Korean and Thai star players.

The All-Star Super Match was first played at the Indoor Stadium Huamark, Bangkok on 3 June 2017.

== Venues ==
Hwaseong	South Korea	Thailand	Bangkok	Nakhon Ratchasima
2018	South Korea	Thailand	2017,2019	2019
Hwaseong Indoor Arena	South Korea	Thailand	Indoor Stadium Huamark	Terminal21 Korat
Capacity: 5,152	South Korea	Thailand	Capacity: 10,000	Capacity: 5,000
	Korea–Thailand Pro Volleyball All-Star Super Match (South Korea)	Korea–Thailand Pro Volleyball All-Star Super Match (Thailand)		

== Match reports ==
Korea Team (2 win)	Thailand Team (2 wins)

=== Thailand 2017 ===
3 June 2017; 14.00 UTC+07:00	Thailand	2–3	South Korea	Indoor Stadium Huamark, Bangkok
3 June 2017; 14.00 UTC+07:00	(25–21, 25–19, 22–25, 23–25, 7–15); Report			Indoor Stadium Huamark, Bangkok

=== Korea 2018 ===
8 April 2018; 18.30 UTC+09:00	South Korea	2–3	Thailand	Hwaseong Indoor Arena, Hwaseong; Attendance: 4,602; Referees: Kang Joo-hee (KOR)
8 April 2018; 18.30 UTC+09:00	(24–26, 25–13, 25–21, 12–25, 13–15); Report			Hwaseong Indoor Arena, Hwaseong; Attendance: 4,602; Referees: Kang Joo-hee (KOR)

=== Thailand 2019 ===
Match 1 – Nakhon Ratchasima

5 April 2019; 12.10 UTC+07:00	Thailand	3–2	South Korea	Terminal21 Korat, Nakhon Ratchasima; Referees: (Thailand) Sasiprapa Pimthongkhonburi (Korea) Choi Jae–hyo
5 April 2019; 12.10 UTC+07:00	(25–23, 29–27, 23–25, 23–25, 15–11); Report			Terminal21 Korat, Nakhon Ratchasima; Referees: (Thailand) Sasiprapa Pimthongkhonburi (Korea) Choi Jae–hyo

Match 2 – Bangkok

7 April 2019; 15.30 UTC+07:00	South Korea	3–0	Thailand	Indoor Stadium Huamark, Bangkok
7 April 2019; 15.30 UTC+07:00	(25–15, 25–21, 25–23)			Indoor Stadium Huamark, Bangkok
