= Chidawan Anandamrongchai =

Thai volleyball player (born 1994)

Personal information
- Nickname: Matoom
- Nationality: Thai
- Born: 4 February 1994 (age 32); Udonthani, Thailand
- Height: 1.76 m (5 ft 9 in)
- Weight: 68 kg (150 lb)
- Spike: 296 cm (117 in)
- Block: 285 cm (112 in)

Volleyball information
- Position: Outside hitter
- Number: 6

Career
Years	Teams
2011–2015	Idea Khonkaen
2015–2016	Thai-Denmark Nongrua
2016–2017	Khonkaen Star

National team
2012	Thailand

Chidawan Anandamrongchai (Thai: ชิดาวัลย์ อนันต์ดำรงชัย) (former name Tanaporn Polrueng Thai: ธนาภรณ์ พลเรือง); born 4 February 1994 is a Thai female volleyball player. She was part of the Thailand women's national volleyball team.

She participated in the 2012 FIVB Volleyball World Grand Prix.

== Awards ==
=== Clubs ===
- 2012–13 Thailand League - Champion, with Idea Khonkaen
- 2013 Thai-Denmark Super League - Champion, with Idea Khonkaen
- 2014–15 Thailand League - Bronze medal, with Idea Khonkaen
