= Korea Primary Volleyball Federation =

- Formation: 1971
- Type: Sports organisation
- Official language: Korean
- President: Lee Byung Seol
- Website: www.kpva.or.kr

Korea Primary Volleyball Federation(hangul : 한국초등배구연맹) is a subordinate organization of the Korea Volleyball Association. It was founded in 1971. It was established for enhancement of volleyball game in Korean elementary schools and the exchange of information among volleyball leaders.

Korean famous female volleyball player Kim Yeon-koung participated in a competition organized by the federation when she was in elementary school. In particular, Lee Byung Seol, the current president of the Federation, was in charge of volleyball at Ansanseo Elementary School at the time and raised Kim Yeon-koung as a volleyball player. Through him, Kim Su-ji and Bae Yoo-na also grew into volleyball players.

== Activities ==
- Hold the national championships and train the leader
- Find and assist volleyball hopefuls
- Provide scholarships to outstanding players

== Events ==
- JEI National Elementary School Volleyball Championship (joint hosting : JEI Corporation)

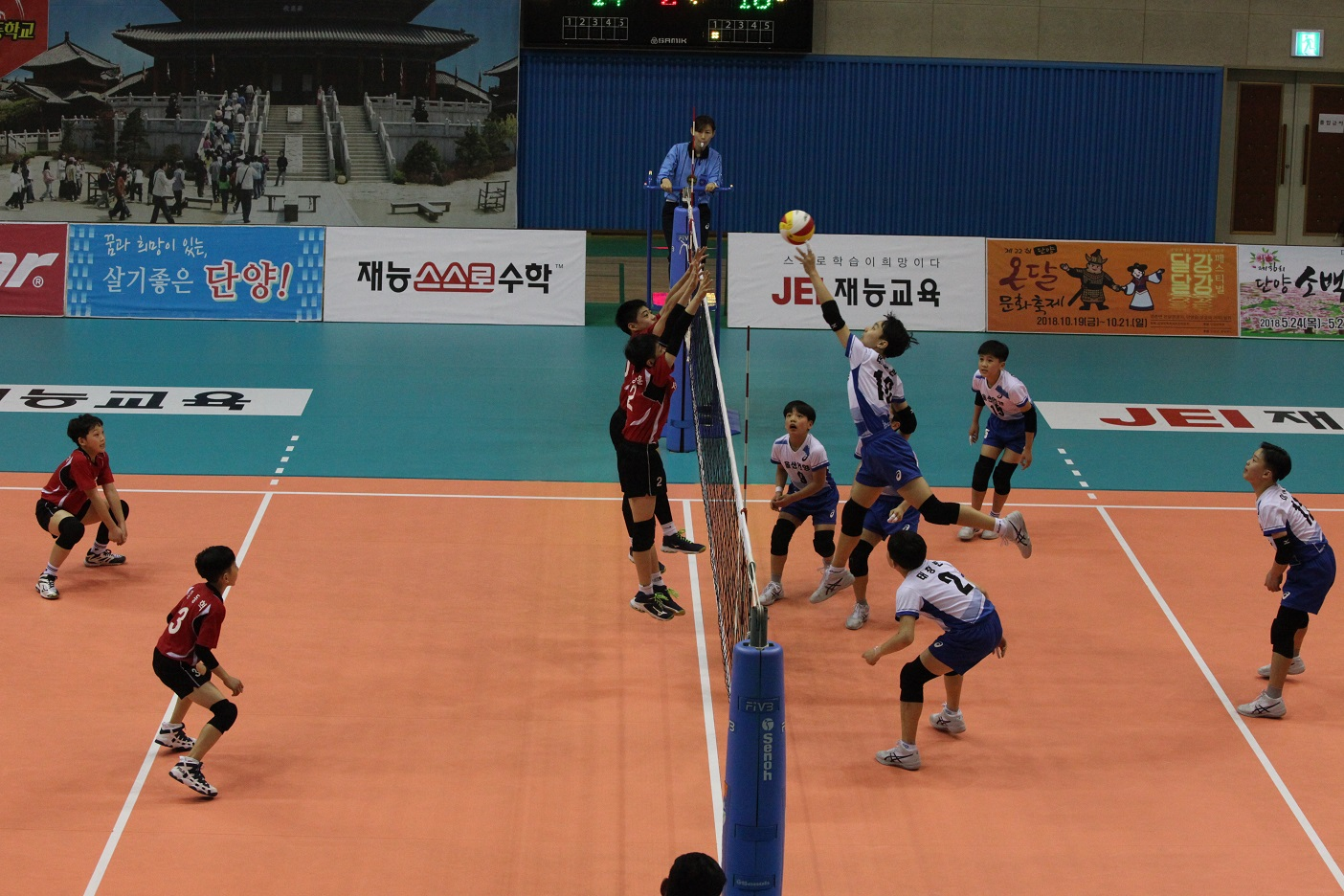
2018 JEI National Elementary School Volleyball Championship

- Chugyebae National Elementary School Volleyball Championship(joint hosting : Jungang Girl's High School)
- KOVO Chongjaebae National Elementary School Volleyball Championship(joint hosting : Korea Volleyball Association)

== See also ==
- Korea Volleyball Federation
- Korea Volleyball Association
