= Đỗ Thị Minh =

Vietnamese volleyball player (born 1988)

Personal information
- Full name: Đỗ Thị Minh
- Nickname: Cụ Rùa
- Born: August 3, 1988 (age 38) Hà Nam, Vietnam
- Height: 1.73 m (5 ft 8 in)
- Weight: 67 kg (148 lb)
- Spike: 300 cm (120 in)
- Block: 285 cm (112 in)

Volleyball information
- Position: Outside hitter
- Number: 9

National team
- Years: Team
- 2006–2015: Vietnam

Đỗ Thị Minh (born August 3, 1988) is a retired Vietnamese volleyball player, and a former member of the Vietnam women's national volleyball team.

== Clubs ==
- (Vietnam) Thông tin LVPB (2002–2017, 2018-2020)
- (Thailand) Idea Khonkaen (2013–2014)

== Awards ==
=== Individual ===
- 2010 VTV International Cup "Most Valuable Player"

=== Clubs ===
- 2005 Vietnam League - Champion, with Thông tin Liên Việt Post Bank
- 2006 Vietnam League - Champion, with Thông tin Liên Việt Post Bank
- 2008 Vietnam League - Champion, with Thông tin Liên Việt Post Bank
- 2009 Vietnam League - Runner-Up, with Thông tin Liên Việt Post Bank
- 2010 Vietnam League - Champion, with Thông tin Liên Việt Post Bank
- 2011 Vietnam League - Runner-Up, with Thông tin Liên Việt Post Bank
- 2012 Vietnam League - Champion, with Thông tin Liên Việt Post Bank
- 2013 Vietnam League - Champion, with Thông tin Liên Việt Post Bank
- 2014 Vietnam League - Champion, with Thông tin Liên Việt Post Bank
- 2015 Vietnam League - Champion, with Thông tin Liên Việt Post Bank
- 2016 Vietnam League - Runner-Up, with Thông tin Liên Việt Post Bank
- 2018 Vietnam League - Runner-Up, with Thông tin Liên Việt Post Bank
- 2019 Vietnam League - Champion, with Thông tin Liên Việt Post Bank
- 2020 Vietnam League - Champion, with Thông tin Liên Việt Post Bank
