= Elisângela Paulino =

Brazilian volleyball player

Elisangela Paulino

Personal information
- Full name: Elisângela Pereira de Souza Paulino
- Nickname: Eli
- Born: 29 April 1980 (age 46); Brasília, Brazil
- Height: 1.88
- Weight: 77 kg (170 lb)
- Spike: 305 cm (120 in)
- Block: 295 cm (116 in)

Volleyball information
- Position: Opposite
- Current club: Khonkaen Star
- Number: 5

National team
1996–2002	Brazil
Honours
Women's volleyball
Representing Brazil
- Last updated: October 2017

Elisângela Paolino (born 29 April 1980) is a Brazilian female volleyball player.

== Clubs ==
- (Brazil) Força Olímpica (1996–2000)
- (Brazil) Macaé Sports (2000–2001)
- (Brazil) Upis Brasilia (2001–2002)
- (Brazil) EC União Suzano (2001–2002)
- (Turkey) Numune SK Ankara (2002–2003)
- (Turkey) Beşiktaş (2003–2004)
- (Turkey) SSK Ankara (2004–2005)
- (Japan) JT Marvelous (2005–2006)
- (Italy) Castellana Grotte (2006–2007)
- (Italy) San Vito Volley (2009–2010)
- (Azerbaijan) Azerrail Baku (2010–2011)
- (Japan) Hisamitsu Springs (2012–2013)
- (Brazil) Brasília Vôlei (2013–2014)
- (Brazil) Maranhão Vôlei (2014–2015)
- (Spain) Club Voleibol Murillo (2016)
- (Turkey) Pursaklar Belediyesi (2016–2017)
- (Thailand) Khonkaen Star (2017–2018)
