= Ivana Luković =

Serbian volleyball player

Personal information
- Full name: Ivana Luković
- Nickname: Vanja
- Nationality: Serbia
- Born: July 18, 1992; Belgrade, Serbia
- Height: 1.92 m (6 ft 4 in)
- Weight: 72 kg (159 lb)

Volleyball information
- Position: Opposite
- Current club: (Romania) CSM București

Career
Years	Teams
2003 - 2011; 2011 - 2012; 2012 - 2013; 2013 - 2014; 2014; 2015 - 2015; 2015 - 2016; 2016 - 2017; 2017 - 2018	(Serbia) Vizura (Italy) Perugia (Greece) Olympiacos (Serbia) Kolubara (Turkey) Eregli Belediyes (Thailand) Idea Khonkaen (Italy) New Volley Libertas (Romania) CSM București (Slovakia) UKF Nitra

National team
2009	U-20 Serbia

Ivana Luković (born 18 July 1992) is a volleyball player from Serbia, playing an opposite. She was a member of the Senior National Team of Serbia in 2013.
