= Selime İlyasoğlu =

Turkish volleyball player (born 1988)

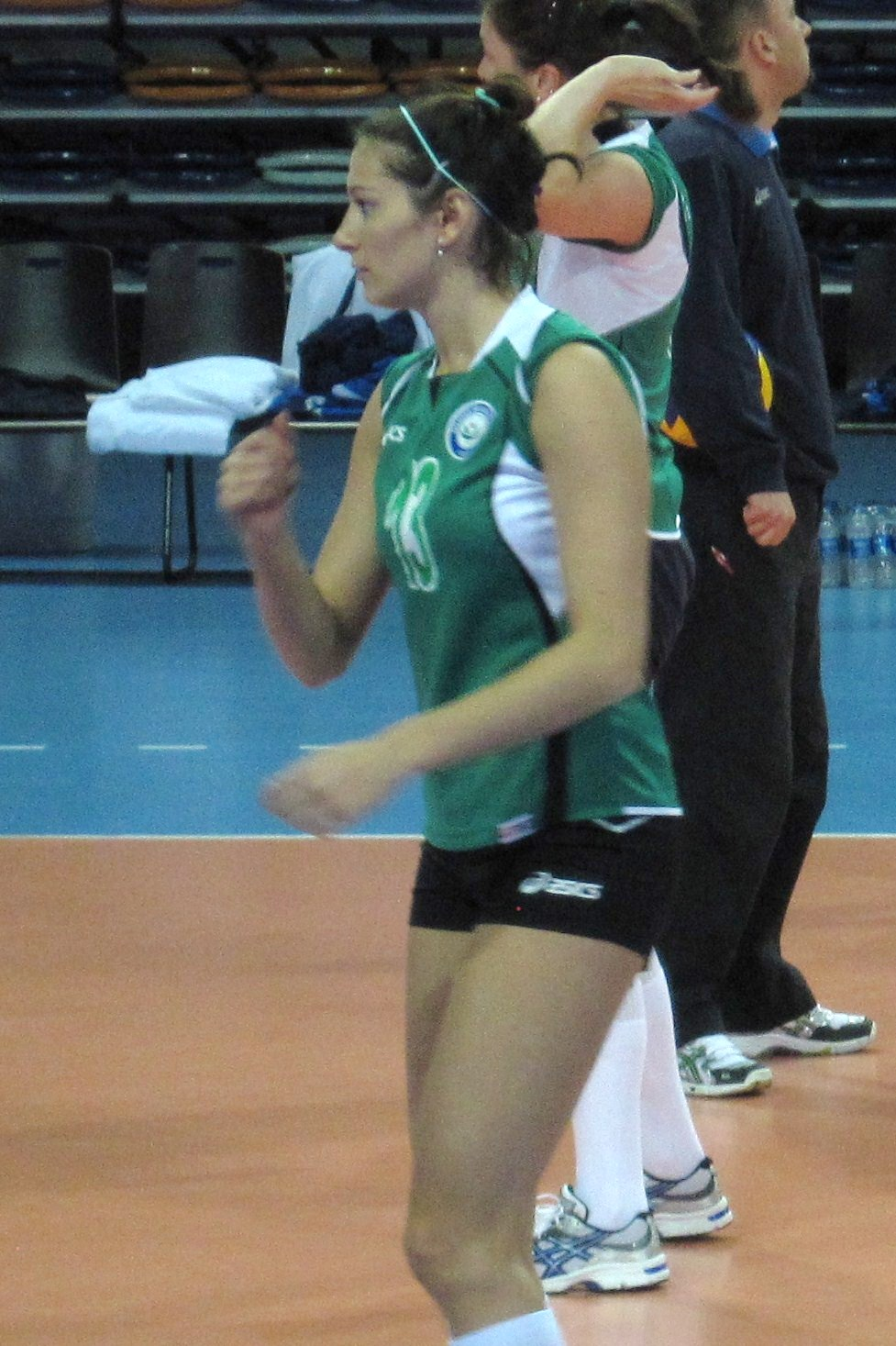

Personal information
- Full name: Selime İlyasoğlu
- Nickname: Seli
- Born: November 18, 1988 (age 37); Turkey
- Height: 1.83 m (6 ft 0 in)
- Weight: 70 kg (154 lb)

Volleyball information
- Position: Outside hitter
- Current club: Foton
- Number: 13

Career
Years	Teams
2008; 2009; 2010; 2011– 2014; 2015; 2019	Eczacıbaşı; Ereğli Belediye; Nilüfer Belediyesi; Galatasaray Daikin; Idea Khonkaen; Foton

Selime İlyasoğlu (born November 18, 1988) is a Turkish volleyball player. She is 183 cm and plays as outside hitter. She plays for Galatasaray Daikin.

== Awards ==
=== National team ===
- 2011 European Championship - Bronze
- 2012 FIVB World Grand Prix - Bronze

=== Club ===
- 2011-12 Turkish Cup - Runner-up, with Galatasaray Daikin
- 2011-12 CEV Cup - Runner-up, with Galatasaray Daikin
- 2012 Turkish Volleyball Super Cup - Runner-Up, with Galatasaray Daikin
- 2012-2013 Turkish Women's Volleyball Cup - Bronze Medal with Galatasaray Daikin
- 2017–18 CEV Champions League - Runner-Up, with CSM Volei Alba Blaj

== See also ==
- Turkish women in sports
