= An Hye-jin =

South Korean volleyball player (born 1998)

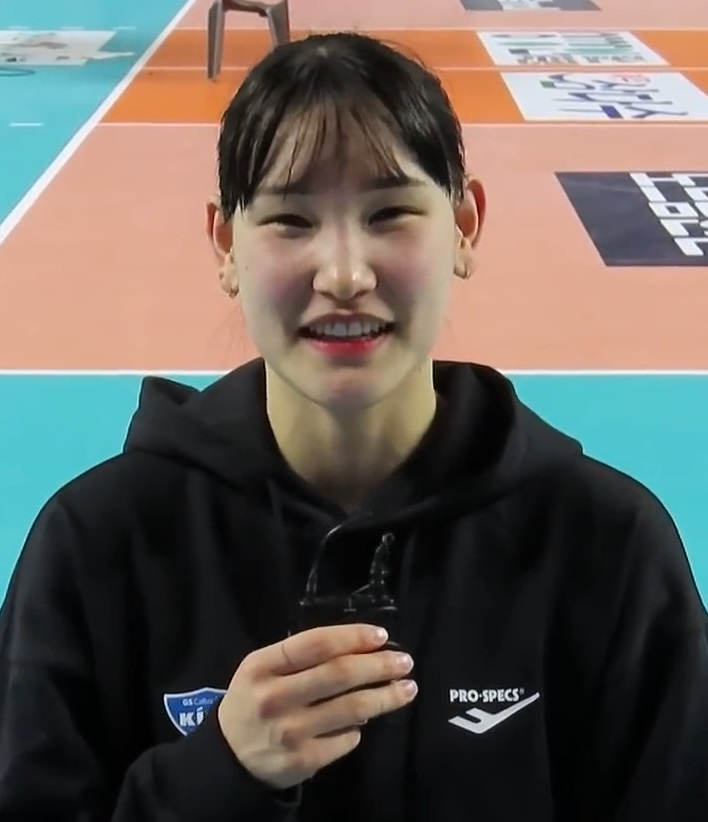
- An Hye-jin in 2020

Personal information
- Nickname: Doraemon, Jangchung Shin Mina
- Nationality: South Korean
- Born: 16 February 1998 (age 28); Asan, South Korea
- Height: 1.75 m (5 ft 9 in)
- Weight: 64 kg (141 lb)
- Spike: 256 cm (101 in)
- Block: 231 cm (91 in)

Volleyball information
- Position: Setter
- Current club: (South Korea) GS Caltex
- Number: 7 (national team), 7 (club)

Career
| Years | Teams |
|---|---|
| 2016- | (South Korea) GS Caltex |

National team
| 2018–2022 | South Korea |

- An Hye-jin
- Hangul: 안혜진
- Hanja: 安惠眞
- RR: An Hyejin
- MR: An Hyejin

An Hye-jin (Korean: 안혜진; Hanja: 安惠眞; born 16 February 1998) is a South Korean professional volleyball player. She is a setter and a member of the South Korean National Team. On the club level, she plays for GS Caltex Seoul KIXX.

She was part of the South Korea women's national volleyball team at the 2020 Summer Olympics. The team finished at fourth place in 2020.

== International career ==
=== National team ===
- Summer Olympics
  - 2020 – 4th Place
- FIVB Volleyball Nations League
  - 2018 - 12th Place
  - 2019 – 15th Place
  - 2021 – 15th Place

== Awards ==
- 2020-21 Korean V-League - "Best Setter"

== Filmography ==
=== TV Show ===
- Running Man – (guest, 572)
- Cool Kiz on the Block – (guest, 160)
