= Anne Matthes =

German volleyball player (born 1985)

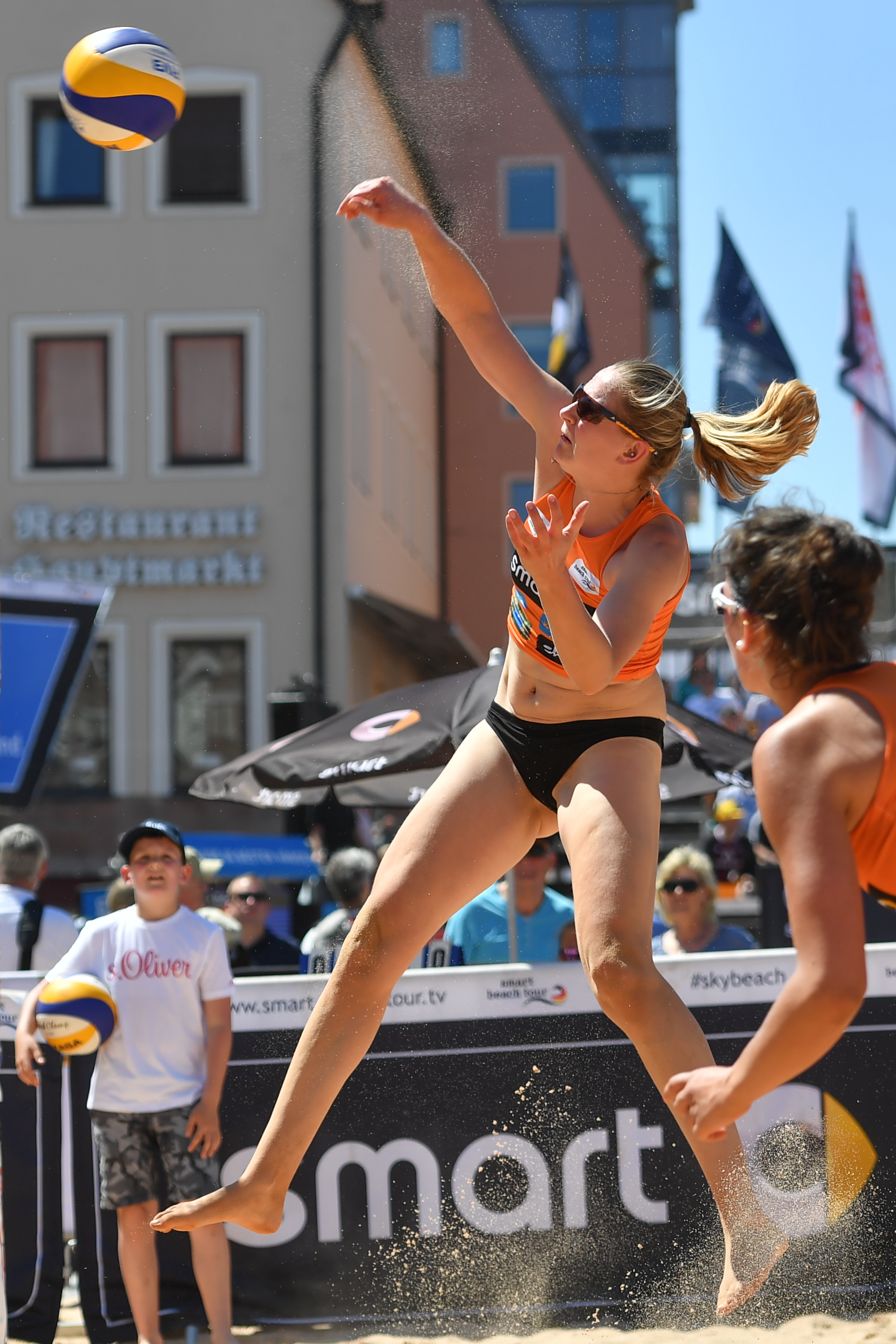

Personal information
- Nationality: German
- Born: 30 April 1985 (age 41)
- Height: 1.82 m (6 ft 0 in)
- Weight: 66 kg (146 lb)
- Spike: 312 cm (123 in)
- Block: 295 cm (116 in)

Volleyball information
- Position: Outside hitter
- Number: 10

Career
| Years | Teams |
|---|---|
| 2010 | (Italy) PVF Matera |

National team
| 2010 | Germany |

Anne Matthes (born 30 April 1985) is a German female volleyball player. She was part of the Germany women's national volleyball team.

She participated at the 2010 FIVB Volleyball Women's World Championship in Japan. She played with PVF Matera.

== Clubs ==
- (Italy) PVF Matera (2010)

== Sources ==
- "Profile - Anne Matthes - Long Beach Grand Slam 2016". Worldtour.2016.fivb.com.
- "Anne Matthes - Beach volleyball, Germany: Results, Fixtures". Soccerstand.com.
- "CEV - Confédération Européenne de Volleyball". Cev.lu.
