= Anke Borowikow =

German volleyball player (born 1986)

Personal information
- Nationality: German
- Born: 13 December 1986 (age 39)
- Height: 186 cm (73 in)
- Weight: 70 kg (154 lb)
- Spike: 305 cm (120 in)
- Block: 295 cm (116 in)

Volleyball information
- Number: 19 (national team)

Career
Years	Teams
2009	1. VC Wiesbaden

National team
2009	Germany

Anke Borowikow (born 13 December 1986) is a German female volleyball player. She was part of the Germany women's national volleyball team.

She participated in the 2009 FIVB Volleyball World Grand Prix. On club level she played for 1. VC Wiesbaden in 2009.
