= Huo Xuan =

Chinese volleyball player (1988–2016)

Personal information
- Nationality: Chinese
- Born: 27 January 1988
- Died: 31 October 2016 (aged 28)
- Height: 190 cm (75 in)
- Weight: 68 kg (150 lb)
- Spike: 312 cm (123 in)
- Block: 305 cm (120 in)

Career
Years	Teams
2009	Henan

National team
2009	China

Huo Xuan (27 January 1988 – 31 October 2016), was a Chinese female volleyball player. She was part of the China women's national volleyball team, including at the 2009 FIVB World Grand Prix. On club level she played for Henan.

Xuan died on 31 October 2016 following a heart attack, she was 28 years old.
