= Leonarda Sgroot =

Dutch volleyball player (born 1986)

Personal information
- Nationality: Dutch
- Born: 26 February 1986 (age 40); Uden, the Netherlands
- Height: 180 cm (71 in)
- Weight: 64 kg (141 lb)

Volleyball information
- Number: 19 (national team)

Career
Years	Teams
2009	AMVJ

National team
2009	Netherlands

Leonarda Sgroot (born 26 February 1986 in Uden) is a Dutch female volleyball player. She was part of the Netherlands women's national volleyball team.

She participated in the 2009 FIVB Volleyball World Grand Prix. On club level she started playing for Saturnus HC and played for AMVJ in 2009.
