= Korea Volleyball Association =

Governing body of volleyball in South Korea

- Logo
- Sport: Volleyball
- Jurisdiction: South Korea
- Abbreviation: KVA
- Founded: 1946; 80 years ago
- Affiliation: FIVB
- Affiliation date: 1959
- Regional affiliation: AVC
- Headquarters: Bangi-dong, Songpa-gu, Seoul
- President: Oh Han-nam
- Secretary: Cho Young-gu

Official website
- www.kva.or.kr
- (South Korea)

The Korea Volleyball Association (KVA; Korean: 대한민국배구협회) is the governing body for volleyball in South Korea. It is a member of the Korean Sport & Olympic Committee. It has exclusive rights to represent South Korea, such as the FIVB and the AVC, to the International Sports Organization. The KVA is responsible for organizing the men's and women's volleyball team.

It was launched in March 25, 1946. In 2007, it became a corporation aggregate.

== National teams ==
For details please refer to main articles for dedicated teams.

Men's

- South Korea men's national volleyball team
- Under-21
- Under-19
- Under-17

Women's

- South Korea women's national volleyball team
- Under-21
- Under-19
- Under-17

== Activities ==
The main business of the association is as follows.

- Review and decide on basic policy
- Hold and participate in international competitions
- Hosting and supervising domestic competitions
- Research and improvement in athletic ability
- Training of players, referees, and operational personnel

== See also ==
- List of international sport federations
- Korea Primary Volleyball Federation
