= Pornthip Santrong =

Thai volleyball player (born 1988)

Personal information
- Nickname: Pui
- Nationality: Thailand
- Born: 11 August 1988 (age 38)
- Height: 1.78 m (5 ft 10 in)
- Weight: 60 kg (132 lb)
- Spike: 314 cm (124 in)
- Block: 295 cm (116 in)

Volleyball information
- Position: Wing spiker
- Current club: Idea Khonkaen
- Number: 8

Career
Years	Teams
2009–	Idea Khonkaen

National team
2009	Thailand

Pornthip Santrong (Thai: พรทิพย์ แสนตรง; (born 11 August 1988) is a Thai female volleyball player. She was part of the Thailand women's national volleyball team.

She participated in the 2009 FIVB Volleyball World Grand Prix. On club level she played for RBAC in 2009.

== Club ==
- (Thailand) Idea Khonkaen (2009–present)

== Awards ==
=== Clubs ===
- 2012–13 Thailand League - Champion, with Idea Khonkaen
- 2013 Thai–Denmark Super League - Champion, with Idea Khonkaen
- 2014–15 Thailand League - Third, with Idea Khonkaen
- 2015 Thai–Denmark Super League - Third, with Idea Khonkaen
- 2016 Thai–Denmark Super League - Third, with Idea Khonkaen
- 2019 Thai–Denmark Super League - Third, with Khonkaen Star
- 2020 Thailand League – Runner-up, with Khonkaen Star
