= Anna Makarova =

Russian volleyball player (born 1984)

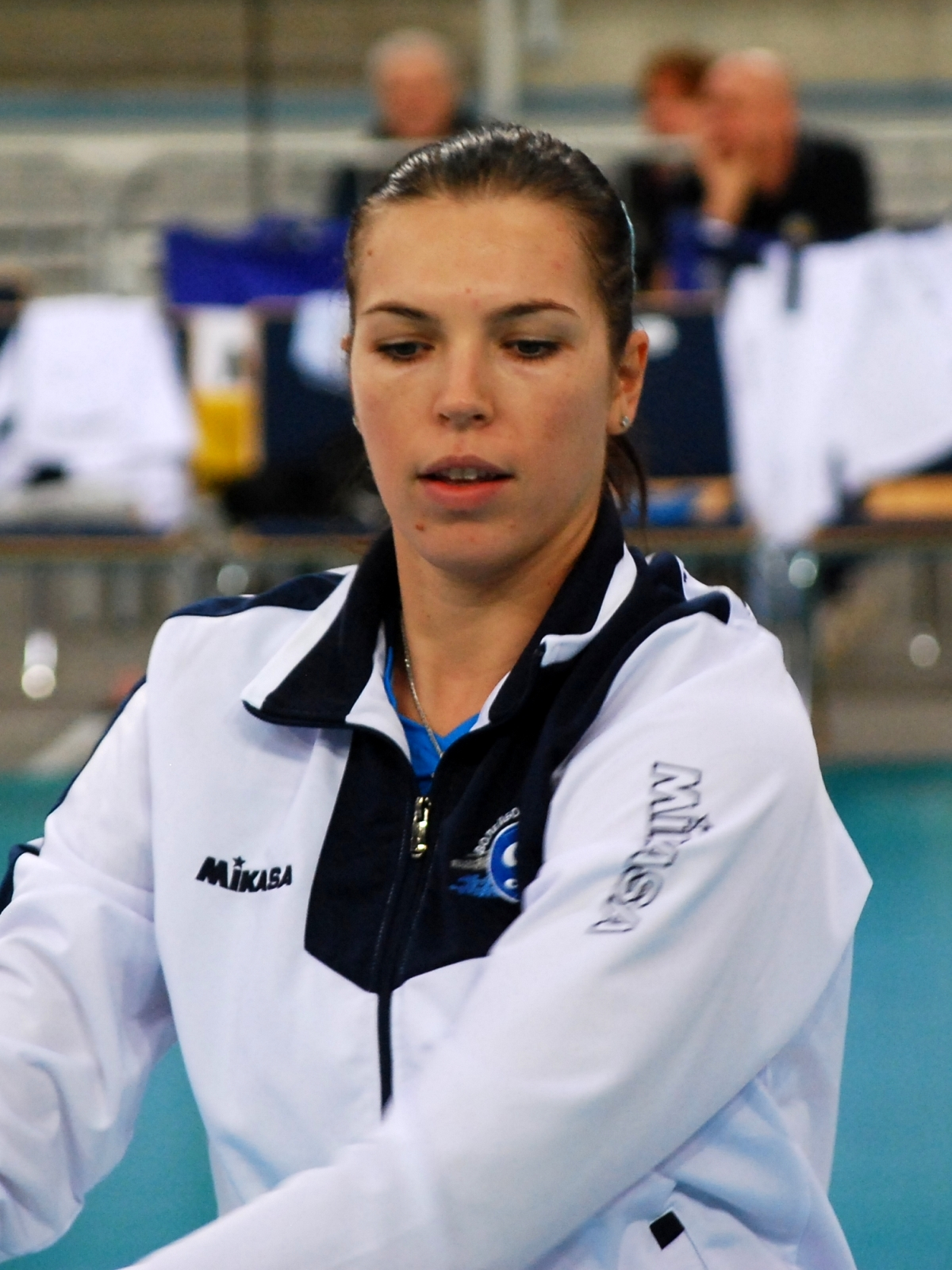

Personal information
- Nationality: Ukrainian
- Born: 2 April 1984 (age 42)

Volleyball information
- Position: Opposite
- Number: 2 (national team)

Career
Years	Teams
2009	VK Samorodok

National team
2009	Russia

Anna Makarova (born 2 April 1984) is a Ukrainian and Russian female former volleyball player, playing as an opposite. She was part of the Russia women's national volleyball team.

She competed at the 2009 Women's European Volleyball Championship. At club level she played for VK Samorodok in 2009.
