= Lee So-young (volleyball) =

South Korean volleyball player (born 1994)

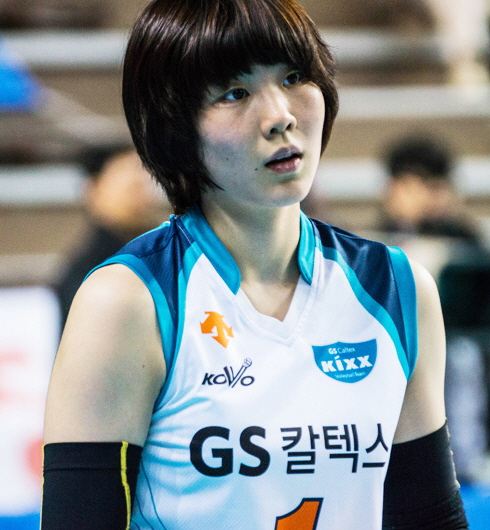

Personal information
- Nickname: So-young senior
- Nationality: South Korean
- Born: 17 October 1994 (age 32); Asan, Chungcheongnam-do, South Korea
- Height: 176 cm (69 in)
- Weight: 68 kg (150 lb)
- Spike: 280 cm (110 in)
- Block: 265 cm (104 in)

Volleyball information
- Position: Outside, Opposite, Libero
- Number: 1 (national team) 1 (club team)

Career
Years	Teams
2012-2021	(South Korea) GS Caltex Seoul KIXX
2021-2024	(South Korea) Daejeon KGC
2024-	(South Korea) Hwaseong IBK Altos

National team
2014-2022	South Korea

Lee So-young
Medal record

Women's volleyball

Representing South Korea

Asian Championship
Bronze medal – third place	2019 Seoul	

U-23 Asian Championship
Bronze medal – third place	2015 Metro Manila	

- Lee So-young
- Hangul: 이소영
- Hanja: 李素英
- RR: I Soyeong
- MR: I Soyŏng

Lee So-young (Korean: 이소영; Hanja: 李素英; born 17 October 1994) is a South Korean volleyball player. She is part of the South Korea women's national volleyball team at the 2020 Summer Olympics. The team finished at fourth place in 2020.

She participated in the 2014 FIVB Volleyball World Grand Prix. On club level she was rostered to GS Caltex in 2012, before signing for Daejeon KGC in 2021.

On November 7, 2025, she announced the termination of her contract under mutual agreement with the team.

== Education ==
- Jeonju Geunyoung Girls High School
- Jeonju Keunyoung Middle School

== International career ==
=== National team ===
- Summer Olympics
  - 2020 – 4th Place
- FIVB World Championship
  - 2018 - 17th Place
- FIVB World Cup
  - 2019 – 6th
- FIVB Volleyball Nations League
  - 2019 – 15th Place
  - 2021 – 15th Place
- Asian Championship
  - 2019 – 3rd
- U23 Asian Championship
  - 2015 – 3rd

== Awards ==
- 2014 KOVO Cup – "Most Important Player"
- 2015 U23 Asian Championship – "Best outside spiker"
- 2018 KOVO Cup – "Most Important Player"
- 2018–19 Korean V-League – "MVP of the Round" (Round 1)
- 2020–21 Korean V-League – "MVP of the Round" (Round 5)
- 2020-21 Korean V-League - "Best outside spiker"
- 2020–21 Korean V-League Finals – "Most valuable player"

== Filmography ==
=== TV Show ===
- Running Man – (guest, 572)
