= Khonkaenstar Volleyball Club =

Thai volleyball club

KKU Khonkaen Star
- Full name: Khon Kaen University Khonkaen Star
- Short name: Khonkaen Star; Khon Kaen
- Nickname: Red Dino
- Founded: 2005
- Ground: Khon Kaen Provincial Gymnasium; Khonkaen, Thailand (Capacity: 4,000)
- Chairman: (Thailand) Panchai Bawonratanapran
- Manager: (Thailand) Panya Phonyoth
- Captain: (Thailand) Tikamporn Changkeaw
- League: Thailand League
- 2024–2025: Runner-up ▲2

Uniforms
Home	Away

Championships
- Thailand League Champion Super League Champion

Khonkaen Star (Thai: สโมสรวอลเลย์บอลขอนแก่นสตาร์) or full name Khon Kaen University Khonkaen Star is a female professional volleyball team based in Khonkaen, Thailand. The club was founded in 2005 and plays in the Thailand league.

Sports team of Khon Kaen Province
Football	Football	Volleyball (Women's)

== Honours ==
=== Domestic competitions ===
- Thailand League
  - Champion (2): 2007–08, 2012–13
  - Runner-up (3): 2009–10, 2019–20, 2024–25
  - Third (2): 2005–06, 2014–15, 2022–23
- Thai-Denmark Super League
  - Champion (1): 2013
  - Third (3): 2015, 2016, 2019
- Kor Royal Cup
  - Third (3): 2013, 2016, 2018

==== Youth League ====
- Academy League
  - Runner-up (1): 2019
  - Third (1): 2018

=== International competitions ===
- Asian Club Championship 1 appearances
  - 2013 — 7th place

== Former names ==
- Khon Kaen (2005–2011)
- SCG Khonkaen (2011–2012)
- Idea Khonkaen (2012–2016)
- Khonkaen Star (2016–2018)
- Thai–Denmark Khonkaen Star (2018–2019)
- Khonkaen Star (2019–2023)
- Khon Kaen University Khonkaen Star VC (2023–present)

== Team colors ==
Thailand League

- (2024–2025)
- (2023–2024)
- (2022–2023)
- (2021–2022)
- (2005–2021)
- (2013–14)
- (2014–15)
- (2015–16)

Thai-Denmark Super League

- (2013)
- (2014)
- (2015)
- (2016)
- (2017–present)

== Stadium and locations ==
Coordinates	Location	Stadium	Capacity	Year
16°24′46″N 102°49′42″E	Khon Kaen	Khon Kaen Provincial Gymnasium	4,000	2005–Present
16°23′57″N 102°48′57″E	Khon Kaen	Khonkaen International Convention and Exhibition Center	10,000	2018–2019

== Crest ==
The club logo incorporates elements from their nickname; The Red Dino and their owner Toyota Kaennakorn.

== League results ==
League		Position	Teams	Matches	Win	Lose
Thailand League	2005–06	3rd place	8	14	–	–
Thailand League	2006–07	–	8	14	–	–
Thailand League	2007–08	Champion	8	14	–	–
Thailand League	2008–09	6	8	14	–	–
Thailand League	2009–10	Runner-up	8	14	10	4
Thailand League	2010–11	4	8	14	–	–
Thailand League	2011–12	5	8	14	–	–
Thailand League	2012–13	Champion	8	14	14	0
Thailand League	2013–14	4	8	14	9	5
Thailand League	2014–15	3rd place	8	14	9	5
Thailand League	2015–16	4	8	14	9	5
Thailand League	2016–17	5	8	14	7	7
Thailand League	2017–18	4	8	14	8	6
Thailand League	2018–19	4	8	16	9	7
Thailand League	2019–20	Runner-up	8	19	13	6
Thailand League	2020–21	5	8	12	5	7
Thailand League	2021–22	4	8	17	6	11
Thailand League	2022–23	3rd place	8	13	5	8
Thailand League	2023–24	4	8	17	6	11
Thailand League	2024–25	Runner-up	8	17	10	7

== Team roster 2024–25 ==
No.	Player	Position	Date of birth	Height (m)
1	(Thailand) Aonanong Saisri	Outside hitter	28 January 2001 (age 24)	1.75
2	(Thailand) Tikamporn Changkeaw (c)	Libero	12 December 1984 (age 40)	1.63
4	(Thailand) Suphatcha Khamtalaksa	Setter	28 June 2002 (age 23)	1.78
5	(Thailand) Soraya Promla	Setter	6 August 1992 (age 33)	1.69
6	(Thailand) Prapatsorn Kongudom	Outside Hitter	20 July 2000 (age 25)	1.68
9	(Thailand) Hathairat Jarat	Middle blocker	9 February 1996 (age 29)	1.83
10	(Thailand) Saowapha Soosuk	Opposite	9 March 2002 (age 23)	1.75
16	(Thailand) Chompunuch Chitsabai	Opposite	23 September 1999 (age 26)	1.75
17	(Thailand) Kuntida Pongyai	Outside Hitter	20 August 2007 (age 18)	1.72
18	(Thailand) Natchanun Mora	Middle blocker	23 February 2001 (age 24)	1.72
19	(Thailand) Apinya Pratibatthong	Opposite	19 June 1998 (age 27)	1.80
20	(Thailand) Suthina Pasang	Outside Hitter	28 October 1999 (age 25)	1.67
21	(Thailand) Pimtawan Thongyot	Libero	30 April 2002 (age 23)	1.72
22	(Thailand) Anongporn Promrat	Middle blocker	2 March 1992 (age 33)	1.82
23	(Thailand) Nirarach Srikuta	Outside Hitter	23 November 2006 (age 18)	1.75
24	(Thailand) Pattrathip Santakoon	Setter	17 June 1996 (age 29)	1.65
25	(Thailand) Kannika Thipachot	Outside Hitter	3 May 1993 (age 32)	1.68
27	(Thailand) Natthawan Phadtaisong	Opposite	16 April 2007 (age 18)	1.78
28	(Thailand) Yaowapha Panyabut	Opposite	28 June 2006 (age 19)	1.69
29	(Thailand) Rawipha Duangpa	Libero	9 January 2008 (age 17)	1.60
41	(Thailand) Kaewkalaya Kamulthala	Setter	7 August 1992 (age 33)	1.78

=== Team staff ===
Name	Position	Country
Panchai Bawonratanapran	Chairman	Thailand
Panya Phonyoth	Team Manager	Thailand
Apirat Ngammeerit	Head coach	Thailand
Kuhnanon Thongtip	Assistant coach	Thailand
Sakol Chankaew	Assistant coach	Thailand
Sirisak Loturat	Physiotherapist	Thailand

== Sponsors ==
- Khon Kaen University
- Toyota Kaennakorn
- Iam Sportwear
- Singha Corporation
- Bayasita KKU
- Royal-D
- AIA
- ChrispowerTH
- Khon Kaen City Development (KKTT) Co., LTD.

== Position Main ==
- The following is the Khonkaen Star roster in the : 2024–25 Women's Volleyball Thailand League

KKU Khonkaen Star

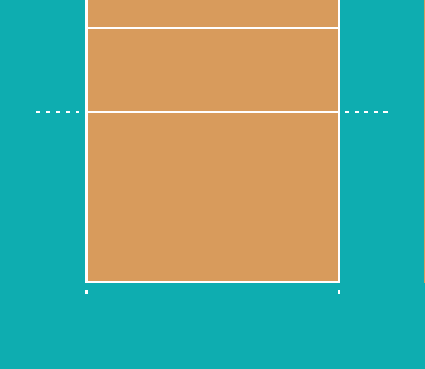

== 2020–21 Results and fixtures ==
=== Thailand League ===
==== First leg ====
date	list	Field	province	rival	Result
24 November 2024	Thailand League 2024-25	(Thailand) MCC Hall The Mall Bangkapi	Bangkok	3BB Nakornnont	3-0 win
29 November 2024	Thailand League 2024-25	(Thailand) Nakhon Pathom Sports Center Gymnasium	Nakhon Pathom	Hand in Hand Ruso RMUTT Vc	3-0 win
6 December 2024	Thailand League 2024-25	(Thailand) Nakhon Pathom Sports Center Gymnasium	Nakhon Pathom	IAM believe Sisaket VC	3-0 win
14 December 2024	Thailand League 2024-25	(Thailand) MCC Hall The Mall Bangkapi	Bangkok	Nakhon Ratchasima Qmin C VC	0-3 loss
21 December 2024	Thailand League 2024-25	(Thailand) MCC Hall The Mall Bangkapi	Bangkok	Kaennakorn -Thailand National Sports University	3-1 win
27 December 2024	Thailand League 2024-25	(Thailand) MCC Hall The Mall Korat	Nakhon Ratchasima	Supreme TIP Chonburi-E.Tech	0-3 loss
5 January 2025	Thailand League 2024-25	(Thailand) MCC Hall The Mall Korat	Nakhon Ratchasima	Nakhonpathom SSRU Volleyball Club	3-0 win

==== Second leg ====
date	list	Field	province	rival	Result
11 January 2025	Thailand League 2024-25	(Thailand) Nakhon Pathom Sports Center Gymnasium	Nakhon Pathom	Nakhonpathom SSRU Volleyball Club	
19 January 2025	Thailand League 2024-25	(Thailand) MCC Hall The Mall Bangkapi	Bangkok	Supreme TIP Chonburi-E.Tech	
25 January 2025	Thailand League 2024-25	(Thailand) MCC Hall The Mall Bangkapi	Bangkok	Hand in Hand Ruso RMUTT Vc	
2 February 2025	Thailand League 2024-25	(Thailand) MCC Hall The Mall Bangkapi	Bangkok	Kaennakorn -Thailand National Sports University	
2 February 2025	Thailand League 2024-25	(Thailand) MCC Hall The Mall Korat	Nakhon Ratchasima	Nakhon Ratchasima Qmin C VC	

== Imports ==
Season	No.	Name	Position	Country	Competing shows		
Season	No.	Name	Position	Country	Thailand League		Thai-Denmark Super League
Season	No.	Name	Position	Country	leg 1	leg 2	Thai-Denmark Super League
2013–14	5	Đỗ Thị Minh	Outside hitter	Vietnam	✔		–
2013–14	6	Nguyễn Thị Kim Liên	Libero	Vietnam	✔		–
2013–14	-	Liu Xiaotong	Outside hitter	China	–	✔	–
2014–15	20	Ivana Luković	Opposite	Serbia	–	✔	
2014–15	21	Selime İlyasoğlu	Outside hitter	Turkey	–	–	✔
2017–18	5	Elisângela Paulino	Opposite	Brazil	–	✔	
2018–19	5	Thaynara Emmel Roxo	Outside hitter	Brazil	✔	–	–
2018–19	8	Paula Ilisandra	Outside hitter	Brazil	✔		

== Head coach ==
Years	Name	Country
2005–2013	Banjong Sombat	Thailand
2013–2015	Apichat Khongsawat	Thailand
2015–2016	Chamnan Dokmai	Thailand
2016–2018	Suntorn Phoseeta	Thailand
2019–Present	Apirat Ngammeerit	Thailand

== Team Captains ==
Years	Name	Country
2005–2013	Em-orn Phanusit	Thailand
2013–2014	Pornthip Santrong	Thailand
2014–2017	Kittiyakorn Phansamdaeng	Thailand
2017–2019	Pornthip Santrong	Thailand
2019–2021	Tapaphaipun Chaisri	Thailand
2021–2022	Em-orn Phanusit	Thailand
2022–	Tikamporn Changkeaw	Thailand

== Club player award ==
Season	Player	Award
2024–25	(Thailand) Tikamporn Changkeaw	Best Libero
2024–25	(Thailand) Kannika Thipachot	Best Outside Hitter
2024–25	(Thailand) Kaewkalaya Kamulthala	Best Middle Blocker
2024–25	(Thailand) Saowapha Soosuk	Best Opposite
2024–25	(Thailand) Hathairat Jarat	Best Serve
2022–23	(Thailand) Tikamporn Changkeaw	Best Libero
2019–20	(Thailand) Thatdao Nuekjang	Best Middle Blocker
2019–20	(Thailand) Pornpun Guedpard	Best Setter
2019–20	(Thailand) Tikamporn Changkeaw	Best Libero
2018–19	(Thailand) Kullapa Piampongsan	Best Setter
2018–19	(Thailand) Tapaphaipun Chaisri	Best Libero
2017–18	(Brazil) Elisângela Paulino	Best scorer
2017–18	(Thailand) Tapaphaipun Chaisri	Best Libero
2016–17	(Thailand) Thatdao Nuekjang	Best Middle Blocker
2015–16	(Thailand) Soraya Phomla	Best Setter
2014–15	(Thailand) Wanna Buakaew	Best Libero
2014–15	(Thailand) Em-orn Phanusit	Best Opposite
2012–13	(Thailand) Tapaphaipun Chaisri	MVP
2012–13	(Thailand) Em-orn Phanusit	Best Spiker
2012–13	(Thailand) Tikamporn Changkeaw	Best Receiver
2012–13	(Thailand) Tikamporn Changkeaw	Best Libero
2011–12	(Thailand) Patcharee Deesamer	Best Middle Blocker
2010–11	(Thailand) Em-orn Phanusit	Best Spiker

== Notable players ==
Domestic Players

Thailand

- Sommai Niyompon
- Utaiwan Kaensing
- Onuma Sittirak
- Patcharee Deesamer
- Saymai Paladsrichuay
- Nootsara Tomkom
- Wanna Buakaew
- Somruk Sungpokeaw
- Soraya Phomla
- Khwanjira Yuttagai
- Kittiyakorn Phansamdaeng
- Chidawan Anandamrongchai
- Rujinan Muencharoen
- Sontaya Keawbundit
- Rapinnipa Kehatankunanon
- Chutikan Pholchai
- Woraluck Kraisorn
- Yupin Phalee
- Kullapa Piampongsan
- Chatsuda Nilapa
- Karina Krause
- Chitaporn Kamlangmak
- Aurairat Laolaem
- Tikamporn Changkeaw
- Natchanun Mora
- Boonyarat Homsomsub
- Rungruetai Sangsakorn
- Tapaphaipun Chaisri
- Kaewkalaya Kamulthala

Foreigner Players

Serbia

- Ivana Luković

Turkey

- Selime İlyasoğlu

Vietnam

- Đỗ Thị Minh
- Nguyễn Thị Kim Liên

Brazil

- Elisângela Paulino
- Thaynara Emmel Roxo
- Paula Ilisandra
