= Krittkanan Phansamdaeng =

Thai volleyball player (born 1988)

Personal information
- Nickname: Pond
- Nationality: Thailand
- Born: 4 January 1988 (age 38); Kalasin, Thailand
- Height: 1.75 m (5 ft 9 in)
- Weight: 63 kg (139 lb)
- Spike: 294 cm (116 in)
- Block: 280 cm (110 in)

Volleyball information
- Position: Setter
- Current club: Nakhon Ratchasima
- Number: 8

National team
| 2008–2009 | Thailand |

Krittkanan Phansamdaeng (Thai: กฤตฆนรรจ์ ผ่านสำแดง, born 4 January 1988) (former name Kittiyakorn Phansamdaeng) is a Thai female volleyball player. She was part of the Thailand women's national volleyball team. On club level she played for RBAC in 2009.

== Clubs ==
- (Thailand) Idea Khonkaen (2009–2017)
- (Thailand) Nakhon Ratchasima (2017–present)

== Awards ==
=== Individuals ===
- 2010 Thailand League "Best Setter"

=== Clubs ===
- 2012–13 Thailand League - Champion, with Idea Khonkaen
- 2017–18 Thailand League - Runner-Up, with Nakhon Ratchasima
- 2018 Thai-Denmark Super League - Bronze medal, with Nakhon Ratchasima
- 2018–19 Thailand League - Champion, with Nakhon Ratchasima
