= Cho Song-hwa =

South Korean volleyball player (born 1993)

Cho Song-Hwa
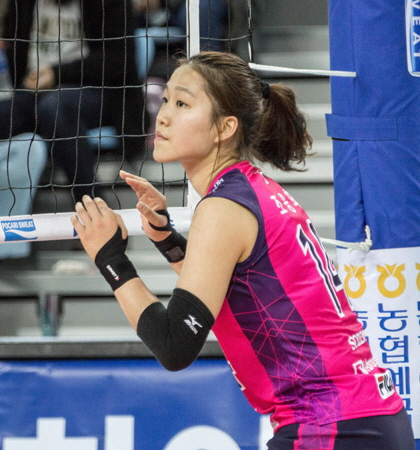

Personal information
- Nationality: South Korean
- Born: 12 March 1993 (age 33); Dongnae-gu, Busan, South Korea
- Height: 176 cm (69 in)
- Weight: 68 kg (150 lb)
- Spike: 280 cm (110 in)
- Block: 260 cm (102 in)

Volleyball information
- Number: 19 (national team)

Career
Years	Teams
2015-2020; 2020-	Heungkuk Life Insurance; Hwaseong IBK Altos

National team
2009-	South Korea

Cho Song-Hwa (Korean: 조송화; Hanja: 趙松花; born 12 March 1993) is a South Korean female volleyball player. She was part of the South Korea women's national volleyball team.

She participated in the 2015 FIVB Volleyball Women's World Cup. On club level she played for Heungkuk Life Insurance in 2015.

In April 2020, IBK Altos revealed that Song-hwa, on FA status, will be moving to their club.
