= Philippine Super Liga All-Stars =

- Full name: Philippine Super Liga All-Stars
- Founded: 2016
- Dissolved: 2019
- League: N/A (League selection)

Uniforms
Home	Away

From 2016 to 2019, the Philippine Super Liga formed a selection team to represent the Philippines in international club competitions such as the Asian Women's Club Volleyball Championship and the FIVB Volleyball Women's Club World Championship. The team has gone by many names, usually taking on the naming rights sponsor, but is often referred to as the Philippine Super Liga All-Stars.

== History ==
=== 2016 ===
==== Thai-Denmark Super League ====
The Philippine Super Liga was invited to participate in the 2016 Women's Volleyball Thai-Denmark Super League in Bangkok, Thailand. The league decided to send a selection team instead of one of the clubs competing in the league. The selection of players was done around late February 2016. The team played in the tournament as "Petron-PSL". PSL president Ramon Suzara, who used to be the secretary general of the Philippine Amateur Volleyball Association (PAVA) when the country won the last gold medal in the Southeast Asian Games women's volleyball in 1993, stated in a press release that the PSL All-Stars selection is a "fighting team". The 14-member team, coached by George Pascua of the Petron Tri-Activ Spikers and assisted by Michael Cariño of the Cignal HD Spikers, was announced on March 1, 2016. Pascua appointed Rachel Daquis of the RC Cola–Army Troopers as the team captain.

The PSL All-Stars lost all its group stage matches against Bangkok Glass, Idea Khonkaen and 3BB Nakhonnont, but managed to win at least a set against each of the teams except Idea Khonkaen. The team won in an exhibition game outside the scope of the tournament against the Hong Kong national team which was also held in Bangkok.

Organizers of a volleyball tournament in Croatia has also expressed their interest to invite the PSL All Stars team in a tourney to be held on July, coinciding with the 2016 PSL All Filipino Conference, according to Suzara, who is also the adviser of Larong Volleyball sa Pilipinas, Inc. (LVPI). The team was also invited to participate in a friendly match with the Hong Kong national team on June 12, 2016. The Hong Kong invitation was confirmed. although the match didn't push through.

==== FIVB Volleyball Women's Club World Championship ====
The PSL fielded its all-star selection for the 2016 FIVB Volleyball Women's Club World Championship to be hosted at home in Pasay from October 18–23, 2016.

27 players from the 8 participating PSL clubs were invited to participate in tryouts held at the Filoil Flying V Centre to determine 7 Philippine-based players who will compose the team that will participate at the international tournament. Six additional foreign players will be selected by the FIVB. It was planned that starting in July 2016, one player that will be part of the team will be announced to the public every week. Although the first two players, Rachel Daquis and Jovelyn Gonzaga, to form the team was announced earlier on June 30, 2016.

The team management also tapped Japan women's national volleyball team assistant coach Shun Takahashi as a head coach of the team in early September 2016 but Takahashi was later reassigned as 1st assistant coach later in the same month following the appointment of Serbian mentor Moro Branislav as head coach. Branislav was stated to be the first choice coach from the start by the management and was just waiting for the Serbian coach to be available. Daquis was named as the team captain.

On September 30, 2016, the PSL announced that the team will be sponsored by F2 Logistics Philippines, Inc. and will compete under the name "PSL-F2 Logistics Manila". Foton was also named as the official transportation provider while Turkish Airlines was designated as official airlines of the team.

PSL-F2 Logistics Manila lost all of its three games in the preliminary round, only winning a set against Turkish club Eczacıbaşı VitrA, the defending champions. Then they lost to Hisamitsu Springs in the classification round for 5th to 8th place. The Philippine team finished last out of the 8 participating teams in the tournament after losing to Thai club Bangkok Glass in the 7th place playoff.

=== 2017 ===
==== Asian Women's Club Championship ====
On May 9, 2017, the PSL announced that the PSL All-Stars would be fielded in the 2017 AVC Women's Club Championship in place of the Foton Tornadoes, after Foton begged off due to its depleted roster. The team played as "Rebisco-PSL Manila" with an All-Filipino lineup coached by Francis Vicente. The team was winless and finished last.

==== Annual Princess Maha Chakri Sirindhorn's Cup ====
The PSL participated at the 2017 Annual Princess Maha Chakri Sirindhorn’s Cup Volleyball Tournament in Sisaket, Thailand. In the preliminary round, the team was classified under Group B along with Bangkok Glass and Rangsit University. Shaq delos Santos was the head coach of the team.

On its first game, the team lost its four-set match against Bangkok Glass. They won their next match with straight sets against Rangsit University securing a place in the semifinal stage. It then lost to PEA-Sisaket and was relegated to the match for the bronze medal.

The team secured a 3-1 set victory over Khonkaen Star becoming the first foreign team to win a medal the Thai hosted tournament. This also marked the PSL All-Star team's first medal in an international tournament.

=== 2018 ===
When the Philippine Super Liga adjusted its calendar to align with the scheduling of both the International Volleyball Federation (FIVB) and the Asian Volleyball Confederation for 2018 in November 2017, the league announced that they would be forming a pool of two to three teams where players for the PSL All-Star team will be drawn.

=== 2019 ===
According to the calendar released by the Philippine Super Liga for 2019, a selection team was participate at the 2019 Asian Women's Club Volleyball Championship in China which was planned to primarily compose of players of the PSL Grand Prix 2019 champions backed with players from other PSL teams although no Philippine team joined the tournament. Also from January 19 to 30, 2019, a PSL selection team was scheduled to play exhibition matches and volleyball clinics outside Metro Manila as part of the PSL On Tour.

A selection team was also planned to participate in lieu of Indonesia which reportedly withdrew from the Philippine leg of the ASEAN Grand Prix. Indonesia reverted its decision and entered the tournament.

Two PSL selection teams, Team Sparkle and Team Shine competed in the 2019 PSL Super Cup.

== Names ==
In most of the tournaments the league selection joined, they competed under a name of a sponsor.

- Petron–PSL (2016 Women's Volleyball Thai-Denmark Super League)
- PSL–F2 Logistics Manila (2016 FIVB Volleyball Women's Club World Championship)
- Rebisco–PSL Manila (2017 Asian Women's Club Volleyball Championship)

== Rosters ==
2017 Asian Women's Club Volleyball Championship
Main article: 2017 Asian Women's Club Volleyball Championship

Head coach: (Philippines) Francis Vicente

No.	Name	Date of birth	Height	Weight	Spike	Block	Club
1	(Philippines) Kim Fajardo	September 30, 1993 (age 32)	1.70 m (5 ft 7 in)	59 kg (130 lb)	275 cm (108 in)	265 cm (104 in)	F2 Logistics Cargo Movers
2	(Philippines) Jaja Santiago	January 30, 1996 (age 30)	1.96 m (6 ft 5 in)	65 kg (143 lb)	280 cm (110 in)	277 cm (109 in)	Foton Tornadoes
3	(Philippines) Mika Reyes	June 21, 1994 (age 32)	1.83 m (6 ft 0 in)	61 kg (134 lb)	283 cm (111 in)	279 cm (110 in)	Petron Blaze Spikers
6	(Philippines) Jovelyn Gonzaga	October 31, 1991 (age 34)	1.73 m (5 ft 8 in)	61 kg (134 lb)	273 cm (107 in)	274 cm (108 in)	Cignal HD Spikers
7	(Philippines) Geneveve Casugod	January 12, 1994 (age 32)	1.85 m (6 ft 1 in)	72 kg (159 lb)	271 cm (107 in)	268 cm (106 in)	Generika-Ayala Lifesavers
8	(Philippines) Aiza Maizo-Pontillas	February 29, 1988 (age 38)	1.78 m (5 ft 10 in)	68 kg (150 lb)	280 cm (110 in)	275 cm (108 in)	Petron Blaze Spikers
10	(Philippines) Maika Ortiz	August 30, 1991 (age 35)	1.80 m (5 ft 11 in)	70 kg (150 lb)	290 cm (110 in)	295 cm (116 in)	Foton Tornadoes
11	(Philippines) Rhea Dimaculangan	March 21, 1991 (age 35)	1.70 m (5 ft 7 in)	66 kg (146 lb)	266 cm (105 in)	256 cm (101 in)	Petron Blaze Spikers
12	(Philippines) Fatima Bia General (L)	August 27, 1995 (age 31)	1.65 m (5 ft 5 in)	60 kg (132 lb)	258 cm (102 in)	252 cm (99 in)	Generika-Ayala Lifesavers
13	(Philippines) Rachel Daquis (c)	December 13, 1987 (age 38)	1.78 m (5 ft 10 in)	58 kg (128 lb)	277 cm (109 in)	268 cm (106 in)	Cignal HD Spikers
14	(Philippines) Denden Lazaro (L)	January 21, 1992 (age 34)	1.65 m (5 ft 5 in)	56 kg (123 lb)	251 cm (99 in)	247 cm (97 in)	COCOLIFE Asset Managers
16	(Philippines) Aby Maraño	December 22, 1992 (age 33)	1.75 m (5 ft 9 in)	54 kg (119 lb)	280 cm (110 in)	270 cm (110 in)	F2 Logistics Cargo Movers
18	(Philippines) Frances Molina	September 24, 1994 (age 31)	1.80 m (5 ft 11 in)	61 kg (134 lb)	280 cm (110 in)	275 cm (108 in)	Petron Blaze Spikers
19	(Philippines) Maria Lourdes Clemente	December 5, 1994 (age 31)	1.86 m (6 ft 1 in)	60 kg (130 lb)	287 cm (113 in)	280 cm (110 in)	Sta. Lucia Lady Realtors

2016 PSL-FIVB Volleyball Women's Club World Championship
Main article: 2016 FIVB Volleyball Women's Club World Championship

Head coach: (Serbia) Moro Branislav

No.	Name	Date of birth	Height	Weight	Spike	Block	Club
1	(Thailand) Tichaya Boonlert	14 January 1997	1.78 m (5 ft 10 in)	64 kg (141 lb)	291 cm (115 in)	283 cm (111 in)	3bb Nakhornnont
3	(Philippines) Jaja Santiago	20 January 1996	1.93 m (6 ft 4 in)	68 kg (150 lb)	280 cm (110 in)	278 cm (109 in)	Foton
4	(United States) Stephanie Niemer	3 September 1989	1.86 m (6 ft 1 in)	70 kg (150 lb)	309 cm (122 in)	295 cm (116 in)	Petron
5	(Japan) Yuri Fukuda (L)	26 June 1987	1.55 m (5 ft 1 in)	56 kg (123 lb)	255 cm (100 in)	250 cm (98 in)	
6	(Philippines) Mika Reyes	21 June 1994	1.82 m (6 ft 0 in)	63 kg (139 lb)	279 cm (110 in)	267 cm (105 in)	F2 Logistics
7	(Philippines) Frances Molina	24 March 1994	1.80 m (5 ft 11 in)	61 kg (134 lb)	280 cm (110 in)	270 cm (110 in)	Petron
8	(Philippines) Jovelyn Gonzaga	30 October 1991	1.73 m (5 ft 8 in)	51 kg (112 lb)	273 cm (107 in)	274 cm (108 in)	RC Cola-Army
9	(Philippines) Kim Fajardo	30 September 1993	1.70 m (5 ft 7 in)	60 kg (130 lb)	275 cm (108 in)	265 cm (104 in)	F2 Logistics
10	(Russia) Ekaterina Krivets	14 December 1984	1.93 m (6 ft 4 in)	74 kg (163 lb)	309 cm (122 in)	300 cm (120 in)	Dinamo Krasnodar
11	(Puerto Rico) Lynda Morales	20 May 1988	1.88 m (6 ft 2 in)	74 kg (163 lb)	302 cm (119 in)	296 cm (117 in)	Cignal
12	(Philippines) Jennylyn Reyes (L)	12 January 1991	1.55 m (5 ft 1 in)	51 kg (112 lb)	258 cm (102 in)	240 cm (94 in)	Petron
13	(Philippines) Rachel Daquis (C)	13 December 1987	1.78 m (5 ft 10 in)	60 kg (130 lb)	277 cm (109 in)	268 cm (106 in)	RC Cola-Army
14	(Ukraine) Yevgeniya Nyukhalova	23 May 1995	1.93 m (6 ft 4 in)	79 kg (174 lb)	310 cm (120 in)	296 cm (117 in)	Zürich
15	(United States) Lindsay Stalzer	15 July 1984	1.85 m (6 ft 1 in)	70 kg (150 lb)	280 cm (110 in)	277 cm (109 in)	Foton

== Team captains ==
- Rachel Daquis (2016)
- Mika Reyes (2017)

== All-time players ==
=== Domestic players ===
- Carmina Aganon (2016)
- Geneveve Casugod (2017)
- Maria Lourdes Clemente (2017)
- Cha Cruz (2016)
- Rachel Daquis (2016 –2017)
- Rhea Dimaculangan (2016 –2017)
- Kim Fajardo (2016 – 2017)
- Fatima Bia General (2017)
- Melissa Gohing (2016)
- Jovelyn Gonzaga (2016 – 2017)
- Michele Gumabao (2016)
- April Ross Hingpit (2016)
- Denden Lazaro (2017)
- Aby Maraño (2016 – 2017)
- Stephanie Mercado (2016)
- Frances Molina (2016 –2017)
- Maika Ortiz (2016 –2017)
- Jeanette Pañaga (2016)
- Aiza Maizo-Pontillas (2016 –2017)
- Jennylyn Reyes (2016)
- Mika Reyes (2016 –2017)
- Jaja Santiago (2016 –2017)

=== Imports ===
- (Thailand) Tichaya Boonlert (2016)
- (Japan) Yuri Fukuda (2016)
- (Russia) Ekaterina Krivets (2016)
- (Puerto Rico) Lynda Morales (2016)
- (United States) Stephanie Niemer (2016)
- (Ukraine) Yevgeniya Nyukhalova (2016)
- (United States) Kristy Lynn Schmieder (2016)
- (United States) Lindsay Stalzer (2016)

== Head coaches ==
Name	Tenure	Tournament
(Philippines) George Pascua	c. March 2016	Thai-Denmark Super League
(Japan) Shun Takahashi	September 2016	None
(Serbia) Moro Branislav	September–October 2016	FIVB Women's Club World Championship
(Philippines) Francis Vicente	May 2017	Asian Women's Club Volleyball Championship
(Philippines) Cesael delos Santos	September 2017	Annual Princess Maha Chakri Sirindhorn's Cup
(Philippines) Carl Dimaculangan (Team Shine)	November 2019	PSL Super Cup
(Philippines) Vilet Ponce de Leon (Team Sparkle)	November 2019	PSL Super Cup

== Fixtures and results ==
Games played
Win Defeat
M	Opponent	Date	Result	Set					Event	Location
M	Opponent	Date	Result	1	2	3	4	5	Event	Location
1	(Thailand) Bangkok Glass	March 23, 2016	1–3	25–23	11–25	16–25	9–25		Thai-Denmark Super League	Bangkok, Thailand
2	(Thailand) Idea Khonkaen	March 24, 2016	0–3	22–25	20–25	19–25			Thai-Denmark Super League	Bangkok, Thailand
3	(Thailand) 3BB Nakhonnont	March 26, 2016	1–3	15–25	11–25	25–23	15–25		Thai-Denmark Super League	Bangkok, Thailand
4	Hong Kong	March 27, 2016	3–0	25–22	25–15	25–20			Exhibition match	Bangkok, Thailand
5	(Brazil) Rexona-Sesc Rio	October 18, 2016	0–3	15–25	13–25	20–25			FIVB Women's Club World Championship	Pasay, Philippines
6	(Italy) Pomì Casalmaggiore	October 20, 2016	0–3	19–25	15–25	21–25			FIVB Women's Club World Championship	Pasay, Philippines
7	(Turkey) Eczacıbaşı VitrA	October 21, 2016	1–3	17–25	17–25	25–23	14–25		FIVB Women's Club World Championship	Pasay, Philippines
8	(Japan) Hisamitsu Springs	October 21, 2016	0–3	15–25	18–25	21–25			FIVB Women's Club World Championship	Pasay, Philippines
9	(Thailand) Bangkok Glass	October 21, 2016	0–3	16–25	23–25	20–25			FIVB Women's Club World Championship	Pasay, Philippines
10	(Japan) Hisamitsu Springs	May 25, 2017	0–3	17–25	10–25	14–25			Asian Women's Club Volleyball Championship	Ust-Kamenogorsk, Kazakhstan
11	(Vietnam) Vietinbank	May 26, 2017	1–3	21–25	25–17	20–25	14–25		Asian Women's Club Volleyball Championship	Ust-Kamenogorsk, Kazakhstan
12	(China) Tianjin Bohai Bank	May 27, 2017	0–3	17–25	11–25	19–25			Asian Women's Club Volleyball Championship	Ust-Kamenogorsk, Kazakhstan
13	(Thailand) Supreme Chonburi	May 29, 2017	1–3	20–25	12–25	25–18	25–27		Asian Women's Club Volleyball Championship	Ust-Kamenogorsk, Kazakhstan
14	(Iran) Sarmayeh Bank	May 30, 2017	0–3	23–25	17–25	27–29			Asian Women's Club Volleyball Championship	Ust-Kamenogorsk, Kazakhstan
15	(Vietnam) Vietinbank	May 31, 2017	0–3	13–25	18–25	15–25			Asian Women's Club Volleyball Championship	Ust-Kamenogorsk, Kazakhstan
16	(Thailand) Bangkok Glass	September 4, 2017	1–3	–	–	–	15–25		Annual Princess Maha Chakri Sirindhorn's Cup	Sisaket, Thailand
17	(Thailand) Rangsit University	September 6, 2017	3–0	26-24	25-19	25-23			Annual Princess Maha Chakri Sirindhorn's Cup	Sisaket, Thailand
18	(Thailand) PEA-Sisaket	September 6, 2017	1–3	25-13	25-13	25-22			Annual Princess Maha Chakri Sirindhorn's Cup	Sisaket, Thailand
19	(Thailand) Khonkaen Star	September 6, 2017	3–1	25-18	25-22	32-34	25-22		Annual Princess Maha Chakri Sirindhorn's Cup	Sisaket, Thailand
20	Philippines (as Team Shine)	November 5, 2019	0–3	14–25	18–25	16–25			PSL Super Cup	San Juan, Philippines
21	(Japan) University of Tsukuba (as Team Sparkle)	November 5, 2019	0–3	8–25	12–25	20–25			PSL Super Cup	San Juan, Philippines
22	(Japan) University of Tsukuba (as Team Shine)	November 7, 2019	0–3	10–25	16–25	16–25			PSL Super Cup	San Juan, Philippines
23	Philippines (as Team Sparkle)	November 7, 2019	0–3	12–25	18–25	18–25			PSL Super Cup	San Juan, Philippines
24	(Philippines) PSL Shine (as Team Sparkle)	November 8, 2019	2–3	25–15	25–19	20–25	22–25	15–17	PSL Super Cup	San Juan, Philippines
Scores and results list the PSL All Stars' figures first. For the 2019 PSL Cup, two selection teams participated with results of both teams listed. Specific PSL selection team in parentheses (or the first team in case of match no 24)

== Competitive records ==
=== FIVB / AVC tournaments ===
FIVB Volleyball Women's Club World Championship:

Year	Round	Position	W	L
(Philippines) 2016	Preliminary round	8th place	0	5

Asian Women's Club Championship:

Year	Round	Position style	W	L
(Kazakhstan) 2017	Seventh place match	8th place	0	6
(China) 2019	Did not enter			

=== Other ===
Volleyball Thai-Denmark Super League:

Year	Round	Position	W	L
(Thailand) 2016	Preliminary round	7th place	0	3

Annual H.R.H. Princess Maha Chakri Sirindhorn's Cup:

Year	Round	Position	W	L
(Thailand) 2017	Bronze medal match	3rd place	2	2

PSL Super Cup

Year	Round	Position	W	L
(Philippines) 2019	Bronze medal match (as Team Shine)	3rd place	1	2
(Philippines) 2019	Bronze medal match (as Team Sparkle)	4th place	0	3
