= 2021 Premier Volleyball League Open Conference =

Only conference of the 2021 PVL season

- Duration: July 17 – August 13, 2021
- Teams: 10
- Matches: 49
- TV partner(s): One Sports; One Sports+

Results
- Champions: Chery Tiggo Crossovers
- Runners-up: Creamline Cool Smashers
- Third place: Petro Gazz Angels
- Fourth place: Choco Mucho Flying Titans

Awards
- Conference MVP: Jaja Santiago
- Finals MVP: Jaja Santiago
- Best OH: Alyssa Valdez; Myla Pablo
- Best MB: Ria Meneses; Jaja Santiago
- Best OPP: Kat Tolentino
- Best Setter: Jia Morado
- Best Libero: Kath Arado

PVL Open Conference chronology
- < 2019 2022 >

PVL conference chronology
- < 2019 Collegiate 2022 Open >

The 2021 Premier Volleyball League Open Conference was the tenth conference of the Premier Volleyball League, its first conference as a professional league, and the only conference of the 2021 season. The conference started on July 17, 2021 and ended on August 13, 2021, at the PCV Socio-Civic and Cultural Center in Bacarra, Ilocos Norte in a bubble. The PVL has been approved by the Inter-Agency Task Force for the Management of Emerging Infectious Diseases (IATF-EID) to begin team practices to be followed by the official start of the 2021 season.

In January 2021, it was reported that Motolite filed a leave of absence from the league and released all of its players. The Philippine Army Lady Troopers will participate as a guest team.

Five teams from Philippine Super Liga joined the PVL – Chery Tiggo Crossovers, Cignal HD Spikers, F2 Logistics Cargo Movers, PLDT Home Fibr Power Hitters and Sta. Lucia Lady Realtors. On July 9, 2021, F2 Logistics announced it will not participate in the Open Conference citing injuries and lack of training due to difficulties maintaining their training bubble.

A newly-established team, the UAC Power Hitters, joined the league but announced in June that it will not compete in the Open Conference as it has not formed a team in time for the conference.

== Participating teams ==
2021 Premier Volleyball League Open Conference
Abbr.	Team	Affiliation	Head coach	Team captain
BLP	BaliPure Purest Water Defenders	Balibago Waterworks System, Inc.	(Philippines) Rommel Abella	Alina Bicar
BMA	Black Mamba Army Lady Troopers	Philippine Army / Corbridge Group	(Philippines) Kungfu Reyes	Jovelyn Gonzaga
CHD	Cignal HD Spikers	Cignal TV, Inc.	(Philippines) Shaq Delos Santos	Rachel Daquis
CTC	Chery Tiggo Crossovers	United Asia Automotive Group, Inc.	(Philippines) Aaron Vélez	Jaja Santiago
CMF	Choco Mucho Flying Titans	Republic Biscuit Corporation	(Philippines) Oliver Almadro	Maddie Madayag
CCS	Creamline Cool Smashers	Republic Biscuit Corporation	(Thailand) Anusorn Bundit	Alyssa Valdez
PRL	Perlas Spikers	Beach Volleyball Republic / Cosmetique Asia Corporation	(Philippines) Reynaldo Diaz Jr.	Jem Ferrer
PGA	Petro Gazz Angels	PetroGazz Ventures Phils. Corp.	(Philippines) Arnold Laniog	Chie Saet
PLD	PLDT Home Fibr Power Hitters	Philippine Long Distance Telephone Company	(Philippines) Roger Gorayeb	Rhea Dimaculangan
SLR	Sta. Lucia Lady Realtors	Sta. Lucia Realty and Development Corporation	(Philippines) Eddieson Orcullo	Rubie de Leon

== Venue ==
The 2021 Premier Volleyball League Open Conference held its first game at the Centennial Arena in Laoag, Ilocos Norte as an isolation zone (bubble). But since Laoag is under Modified Enhanced Community Quarantine days before the tournament, teams temporarily moved the venue to PCV Socio-Civic and Cultural Center in Bacarra, Ilocos Norte. The conference began July 17, 2021, the bubble accommodated 11 teams.

The original schedule of the 2021 bubble was supposed to be in February or March. Ricky Palou, president of Sports Vision Management (organizers of the PVL), said that they did not want to compete with basketball as the Samahang Basketbol ng Pilipinas is having an international tournament in February. Philippine men's basketball team will hold practices and will compete for the February window of the 2021 FIBA Asia Cup qualification to be held also at the Inspire Sports Academy.

Cignal TV will be the official broadcast partner under a 3-year contract.

=== Training venues ===
The following venues served as the training ground of the PVL teams as approved by the Games and Amusements Board (GAB).

Abbr.	Team	Training venue(s)	Ref.
BLP	BaliPure Purest Water Defenders	Colegio de Sebastian Gym, San Fernando, Pampanga	
BMA	Black Mamba Army Lady Troopers	Philippine Army Gym, Taguig	
CHD	Cignal HD Spikers	Splendido Country Club, Laurel, Batangas	
CTC	Chery Tiggo Crossovers	Subic Bay Free Port	
CMF	Choco Mucho Flying Titans	St. Paul American School – Clark, Pampanga	
CCS	Creamline Cool Smashers	St. Paul American School – Clark, Pampanga	
PRL	Perlas Spikers	St. Vincent Gym, Baguio	
PGA	Petro Gazz Angels	Santa Maria, Bulacan	
PLD	PLDT Home Fibr Power Hitters	Splendido Hotel, Alfonso, Cavite	
SLR	Sta. Lucia Lady Realtors	Sta. Lucia East Grand Mall Gym, Cainta, Rizal	

== Transactions ==
=== National team players ===
- The following players were part of the national team that competed in 2019 international games.

Team	Player/s		
Black Mamba Army Lady Troopers	Jovelyn Gonzaga	—N/a	
Chery Tiggo 7 Pro Crossovers	Jasmine Nabor	Mylene Paat	—N/a
Choco Mucho Flying Titans	Denden Lazaro	Maddie Madayag	—N/a
Cignal HD Spikers	Roselyn Doria	—N/a	
Creamline Cool Smashers	Alyssa Valdez	Jia Morado	—N/a
Petro Gazz Angels	Frances Molina	Grethcel Soltones	Kath Arado
PLDT Home Fibr Power Hitters	Rhea Dimaculangan	—N/a	
Sta. Lucia Lady Realtors	Aiza Maizo-Pontillas	Mika Reyes	—N/a

=== Team additions and transfers ===
The following are the players who transferred to another team on the upcoming conference.

Player	Moving from (2019–2020 team)	Moving to
Alexa Mari Rafael	Lyceum Pirates (NCAA)	BaliPure Purest Water Defenders
Alina Joyce Bicar	Philippine Army Lady Troopers	BaliPure Purest Water Defenders
Bien Elaine Juanillo	Chef's Classics Lady Red Spikers	BaliPure Purest Water Defenders
Carlota Hernandez	Marinerang Pilipina Lady Skippers (PSL)	BaliPure Purest Water Defenders
Geneveve Casugod	Marinerang Pilipina Lady Skippers (PSL)	BaliPure Purest Water Defenders
Grazielle Bombita	Motolite Power Builders	BaliPure Purest Water Defenders
Gyra Ezra Barroga	Choco Mucho Flying Titans	BaliPure Purest Water Defenders
Judith Abil	Marinerang Pilipina Lady Skippers (PSL)	BaliPure Purest Water Defenders
Julia Angeles	Chery Tiggo Crossovers	BaliPure Purest Water Defenders
Laizah Ann Bendong	Chery Tiggo Crossovers	BaliPure Purest Water Defenders
Roselle Baliton	Petron Blaze Spikers (PSL)	BaliPure Purest Water Defenders
Satriani Espiritu	Motolite Power Builders	BaliPure Purest Water Defenders
Shirley Salamagos	Kurashiki Ablaze (Japan)	BaliPure Purest Water Defenders
Czarina Grace Carandang	FEU Lady Tamaraws (UAAP)	Perlas Spikers
Maria Angelica Cayuna	FEU Lady Tamaraws(UAAP)	Perlas Spikers
Cherry Rose Nunag	Petro Gazz Angels	Perlas Spikers
Heather Anne Guino-o	Creamline Cool Smashers	Perlas Spikers
Jellie Tempiatura	Motolite Power Builders	Perlas Spikers
Jhoana Louisse Maraguinot	Sta. Lucia Lady Realtors	Perlas Spikers
Michelle Kathereen Morente	F2 Logistics Cargo Movers	Perlas Spikers
Tonnie Rose Ponce	Creamline Cool Smashers	Perlas Spikers
Jaja Santiago	Saitama Ageo Medics (Japan V.League)	Chery Tiggo Crossovers
Tina Salak	Philippine Army Lady Troopers	Chery Tiggo Crossovers
Caitlyn Viray	Marinerang Pilipina Lady Skippers (PSL)	Choco Mucho Flying Titans
Deanna Wong	Ateneo Lady Eagles (UAAP)	Choco Mucho Flying Titans
Denden Lazaro-Revilla	Petron Blaze Spikers (PSL)	Choco Mucho Flying Titans
Jamie Isabelle Lavitoria	Generika-Ayala Lifesavers (PSL)	Choco Mucho Flying Titans
Necole Ebuen	Arellano Lady Chiefs (NCAA)	Choco Mucho Flying Titans
Pauline Gaston	Ateneo Lady Eagles (UAAP)	Choco Mucho Flying Titans
Regine Anne Arocha	Sta. Lucia Lady Realtors	Choco Mucho Flying Titans
Klarissa Abriam	Benilde Lady Blazers (NCAA)	Cignal HD Spikers
Ayel Estrañero	Motolite Power Builders	Cignal HD Spikers
Tots Carlos	Motolite Power Builders	Creamline Cool Smashers
Ella de Jesus	Perlas Spikers	Creamline Cool Smashers
Jeanette Panaga	Petro Gazz Angels	Creamline Cool Smashers
Frances Molina	Petron Blaze Spikers (PSL)	Petro Gazz Angels
Grethcel Soltones	PLDT Home Fibr Power Hitters	Petro Gazz Angels
Ivy Jisel Perez	Foton Tornadoes Blue Energy (PSL)	Petro Gazz Angels
Jerrili Malabanan	PLDT Home Fibr Power Hitters	Petro Gazz Angels
Kath Arado	Generika-Ayala Lifesavers (PSL)	Petro Gazz Angels
Ria Meneses	Generika-Ayala Lifesavers (PSL)	Petro Gazz Angels
Mean Mendrez	Generika-Ayala Lifesavers (PSL)	Petro Gazz Angels
Remy Palma	Petron Blaze Spikers (PSL)	Petro Gazz Angels
Myla Pablo	Motolite Power Builders	Petro Gazz Angels
Seth Marione Rodriguez	Marinerang Pilipina Lady Skippers (PSL)	Petro Gazz Angels
Audrey Kathryn Paran	NU Lady Bulldogs (UAAP)	Philippine Army Lady Troopers
Christine Dianne Francisco	UST Golden Tigresses (UAAP)	Philippine Army Lady Troopers
Fenela Risha Emnas	Motolite Power Builders	Philippine Army Lady Troopers
Mary Anne Esguerra	Petron Blaze Spikers (PSL)	Philippine Army Lady Troopers
Christine Joy Soyud	Generika-Ayala Lifesavers (PSL)	PLDT Home Fibr Power Hitters
Isa Molde	Motolite Power Builders	PLDT Home Fibr Power Hitters
Maria Nieza Viray	BaliPure Purest Water Defenders	PLDT Home Fibr Power Hitters
Mariella Gabarda	Generika-Ayala Lifesavers (PSL)	PLDT Home Fibr Power Hitters
Maristella Gene Layug	Sta. Lucia Lady Realtors	PLDT Home Fibr Power Hitters
Rhea Dimaculangan	Generika-Ayala Lifesavers (PSL)	PLDT Home Fibr Power Hitters
Toni Rose Basas	Generika-Ayala Lifesavers (PSL)	PLDT Home Fibr Power Hitters
Aiza Maizo-Pontillas	Petron Blaze Spikers (PSL)	Sta. Lucia Lady Realtors
Dell Palomata	Philippine Air Force Lady Jet Spikers	Sta. Lucia Lady Realtors
Jonah Sabete	Petro Gazz Angels	Sta. Lucia Lady Realtors
Jovielyn Grace Prado	Petro Gazz Angels	Sta. Lucia Lady Realtors
Maricar Nepomuceno-Baloaloa	Petro Gazz Angels	Sta. Lucia Lady Realtors

=== Coaching changes ===
Team	Outgoing coach	Manner of departure	Replaced by	Ref
Cignal HD Spikers	(Philippines) Edgar Barroga	Replaced due to non-renewal of contract	(Philippines) Cesael Delos Santos	
Perlas Spikers	(Thailand) Apichat Kongsawat	Replaced	(Philippines) Reynaldo Diaz Jr.	

== Format ==
Preliminary round

The ten teams compete in a single round-robin tournament, with each team playing one match against all other teams for a total of nine matches. The top four teams will advance to the semifinals while the bottom six will be eliminated and ranked 5th through 10th in the final standings.

Semifinals

The top four teams from the preliminary round and the top two from the quarterfinals compete in the semifinals. Teams compete in best-of-three series with the winners advancing to the finals while the losers will compete in the third place series. The match-ups for the semifinals are as follows:

- SF1: PR #1 vs. PR #4
- SF2: PR #2 vs. PR #3

Third place series

The losing teams from the semifinals compete in a best-of-three series to determine which team will finish third in this conference. If the series is tied at 1–1 when the championship is decided, the pool standing procedure will be used (starting from set ratio).

Finals

The winning teams from the semifinals compete in a best-of-three series to determine the conference champions. The losing team in this round will be declared conference runners-up.

== Pool standing procedure ==
Teams are initially ranked by wins followed by match points. A win awards three points if the match lasted for three or four sets (3–0 or 3–1), or two points if the match lasted for five sets (3–2). A loss only awards one point if the match lasted for five sets (2–3).

If multiple teams tie for wins and match points, the next criteria are set ratio (the number of sets won divided by number of sets lost across all matches) and point ratio (the number of points won divided by number of points lost across all matches). If any teams are still tied, the procedure will be applied again, but only considering matches between the remaining tied teams.

== Preliminary round ==
- All times are Philippine Standard Time (UTC+8:00).

=== Ranking ===
Pos	Team	Pld	W	L	Pts	SW	SL	SR	SPW	SPL	SPR	Qualification
1	Creamline Cool Smashers	9	8	1	21	25	11	2.273	837	687	1.218	Semifinals
2	Chery Tiggo Crossovers	9	7	2	23	25	7	3.571	749	608	1.232	Semifinals
3	Choco Mucho Flying Titans	9	7	2	22	23	9	2.556	721	675	1.068	Semifinals
4	Petro Gazz Angels	9	6	3	18	20	11	1.818	736	674	1.092	Semifinals
5	Sta. Lucia Lady Realtors	9	5	4	14	17	15	1.133	716	663	1.080	
6	Black Mamba Army Lady Troopers	9	4	5	13	16	19	0.842	770	781	0.986	
7	PLDT Home Fibr Power Hitters	9	3	6	9	12	18	0.667	614	672	0.914	
8	BaliPure Purest Water Defenders	9	3	6	8	11	22	0.500	656	781	0.840	
9	Perlas Spikers	9	1	8	4	7	25	0.280	636	771	0.825	
10	Cignal HD Spikers	9	1	8	3	6	25	0.240	623	746	0.835	

Source: PhilSports.ph

=== Match results ===
Date	Time		Score		Set 1	Set 2	Set 3	Set 4	Set 5	Total	Report
Jul 17	15:00	Chery Tiggo Crossovers	3–0	PLDT Home Fibr Power Hitters	25–20	25–17	25–6			75–43	P2
Jul 17	18:00	Sta. Lucia Lady Realtors	1–3	Creamline Cool Smashers	18–25	21–25	27–25	18–25		84–100	P2
Jul 18	16:00	Petro Gazz Angels	3–1	Black Mamba Army Lady Troopers	25–19	22–25	25–20	25–21		97–85	P2
Jul 19	15:00	PLDT Home Fibr Power Hitters	0–3	Sta. Lucia Lady Realtors	18–25	19–25	21–25			58–75	P2
Jul 19	18:00	Cignal HD Spikers	0–3	Chery Tiggo Crossovers	16–25	13–25	19–25			48–75	P2
Jul 20	15:00	Creamline Cool Smashers	3–1	Petro Gazz Angels	24–26	28–26	25–22	25–20		102–94	P2
Jul 20	18:00	Black Mamba Army Lady Troopers	3–1	BaliPure Purest Water Defenders	25–16	25–27	25–21	26–24		101–88	P2
Jul 21	15:00	Cignal HD Spikers	3–1	Sta. Lucia Lady Realtors	25–22	25–18	13–25	25–20		88–85	P2
Jul 21	18:00	Choco Mucho Flying Titans	3–1	PLDT Home Fibr Power Hitters	28–26	10–25	27–25	25–11		90–87	P2
Jul 22	15:00	Black Mamba Army Lady Troopers	2–3	Creamline Cool Smashers	25–20	15–25	27–25	19–25	13–15	99–110	P2
Jul 22	18:00	Chery Tiggo Crossovers	2–3	BaliPure Purest Water Defenders	25–19	19–25	25–13	25–27	12–15	106–99	P2
Jul 23	15:00	Sta. Lucia Lady Realtors	0–3	Choco Mucho Flying Titans	17–25	22–25	20–25			59–75	P2
Jul 23	18:00	Petro Gazz Angels	3–0	Cignal HD Spikers	25–22	25–18	25–21			75–61	P2
Jul 25	13:00	Creamline Cool Smashers	3–0	PLDT Home Fibr Power Hitters	25–16	25–12	25–13			75–41	P2
Jul 25	16:00	Choco Mucho Flying Titans	3–0	Perlas Spikers	25–23	25–20	25–20			75–63	P2
Jul 25	19:00	Cignal HD Spikers	1–3	BaliPure Purest Water Defenders	25–21	20–25	22–25	22–25		89–96	P2
Jul 26	15:00	Perlas Spikers	0–3	Chery Tiggo Crossovers	10–25	25–27	23–25			58–77	P2
Jul 26	18:00	Sta. Lucia Lady Realtors	3–1	Black Mamba Army Lady Troopers	25–23	25–20	22–25	25–18		97–86	P2
Jul 27	15:00	Choco Mucho Flying Titans	3–0	Cignal HD Spikers	26–24	25–12	25–17			76–53	P2
Jul 27	18:00	PLDT Home Fibr Power Hitters	1–3	Petro Gazz Angels	12–25	25–20	21–25	20–25		78–95	P2
Jul 28	15:00	Chery Tiggo Crossovers	2–3	Sta. Lucia Lady Realtors	20–25	12–25	26–24	25–21	10–15	93–110	P2
Jul 28	18:00	BaliPure Purest Water Defenders	0–3	Creamline Cool Smashers	12–25	3–25	15–25			30–75	P2
Jul 29	15:00	Perlas Spikers	3–1	Cignal HD Spikers	20–25	25–20	25–22	25–21		95–88	P2
Jul 29	18:00	PLDT Home Fibr Power Hitters	1–3	Black Mamba Army Lady Troopers	25–20	17–25	20–25	20–25		82–95	P2
Jul 30	13:00	BaliPure Purest Water Defenders	1–3	Choco Mucho Flying Titans	23–25	25–23	15–25	21–25		84–98	P2
Jul 30	16:00	Perlas Spikers	0–3	Petro Gazz Angels	17–25	18–25	17–25			52–75	P2
Jul 30	19:00	Chery Tiggo Crossovers	3–1	Creamline Cool Smashers	25–18	25–23	23–25	25–20		98–86	P2
Aug 01	13:00	Chery Tiggo Crossovers	3–0	Petro Gazz Angels	25–18	25–20	25–22			75–60	P2
Aug 01	16:00	BaliPure Purest Water Defenders	0–3	Sta. Lucia Lady Realtors	15–25	12–25	14–25			41–75	P2
Aug 01	19:00	Perlas Spikers	0–3	PLDT Home Fibr Power Hitters	22–25	20–25	21–25			63–75	P2
Aug 02	15:00	Choco Mucho Flying Titans	3–0	Black Mamba Army Lady Troopers	25–19	25–23	25–19			75–61	P2
Aug 02	18:00	Cignal HD Spikers	0–3	Creamline Cool Smashers	22–25	25–27	19–25			66–77	P2
Aug 03	15:00	Petro Gazz Angels	3–0	BaliPure Purest Water Defenders	25–20	26–24	25–23			76–67	P2
Aug 03	18:00	Sta. Lucia Lady Realtors	3–0	Perlas Spikers	25–13	25–18	25–16			75–47	P2
Aug 04	15:00	Black Mamba Army Lady Troopers	0–3	Chery Tiggo Crossovers	16–25	16–25	21–25			53–75	P2
Aug 04	18:00	Creamline Cool Smashers	3–2	Choco Mucho Flying Titans	18–25	25–9	21–25	25–18	15–6	104–83	P2
Aug 05	13:00	PLDT Home Fibr Power Hitters	3–0	BaliPure Purest Water Defenders	25–17	25–15	25–19			75–51	P2
Aug 05	16:00	Black Mamba Army Lady Troopers	3–1	Perlas Spikers	23–25	25–21	25–21	25–13		98–80	P2
Aug 05	19:00	Petro Gazz Angels	3–0	Sta. Lucia Lady Realtors	25–13	25–21	25–22			75–56	P2
Aug 06	13:00	Creamline Cool Smashers	3–2	Perlas Spikers	25–12	22–25	21–25	25–20	15–10	108–92	P2
Aug 06	16:00	Choco Mucho Flying Titans	3–1	Petro Gazz Angels	25–20	23–25	25–21	25–23		98–89	P2
Aug 06	19:00	Cignal HD Spikers	0–3	PLDT Home Fibr Power Hitters	20–25	14–25	19–25			53–75	P2
Aug 07	13:00	BaliPure Purest Water Defenders	3–1	Perlas Spikers	24–26	25–19	25–17	26–24		100–86	P2
Aug 07	16:00	Chery Tiggo Crossovers	3–0	Choco Mucho Flying Titans	25–20	25–9	25–22			75–51	P2
Aug 07	19:00	Cignal HD Spikers	1–3	Black Mamba Army Lady Troopers	14–25	25–17	19–25	19–25		77–92	P2

== Bracket ==
Semifinals
August 8–9
1 Creamline	3	3
4 Petro Gazz	2	0
August 8–10
2 Chery Tiggo	0	3	3
3 Choco Mucho	3	0	0

Championship
August 11–13
Creamline	3	1	2
Chery Tiggo	2	3	3
3rd place match
August 11–12
Petro Gazz	3	3
Choco Mucho	1	0

== Semifinals ==
- All times are Philippine Standard Time (UTC+8:00).

=== (1) Creamline vs. (4) Petro Gazz ===
August 8, 2021; 2:00 pm	Petro Gazz Angels	2–3	Creamline Cool Smashers	Referees: Erlindo Eusebio (PHI), Rene Gaspillo (PHI)
August 8, 2021; 2:00 pm	(29–27, 23–25, 25–16, 17–25, 14–16); P2			Referees: Erlindo Eusebio (PHI), Rene Gaspillo (PHI)
Creamline leads series, 1–0

August 9, 2021; 7:00 pm	Creamline Cool Smashers	3–0	Petro Gazz Angels	Referees: Lumer Pajarillo (PHI), Nestor Matimatico (PHI)
August 9, 2021; 7:00 pm	(27–25, 25–22, 25–16); P2			Referees: Lumer Pajarillo (PHI), Nestor Matimatico (PHI)
Creamline wins series, 2–0

=== (2) Chery Tiggo vs. (3) Choco Mucho ===
August 8, 2021; 5:00 pm	Choco Mucho Flying Titans	3–0	Chery Tiggo Crossovers	Referees: Lumer Pajarillo (PHI), Joy de Imus (PHI)
August 8, 2021; 5:00 pm	(25–18, 25–22, 25–21); P2			Referees: Lumer Pajarillo (PHI), Joy de Imus (PHI)
Choco Mucho leads series, 1–0

August 9, 2021; 2:00 pm	Chery Tiggo Crossovers	3–0	Choco Mucho Flying Titans	Referees: Rene Gaspillo (PHI), Mark Santos (PHI)
August 9, 2021; 2:00 pm	(25–18, 25–22, 26–24); P2			Referees: Rene Gaspillo (PHI), Mark Santos (PHI)
Series tied, 1–1

August 10, 2021; 3:00 pm	Chery Tiggo Crossovers	3–0	Choco Mucho Flying Titans	Referees: Erlindo Eusebio (PHI), Joy de Imus (PHI)
August 10, 2021; 3:00 pm	(25–16, 26–24, 25–23); P2			Referees: Erlindo Eusebio (PHI), Joy de Imus (PHI)
Chery Tiggo wins series, 2–1

== Third place series ==
- All times are Philippine Standard Time (UTC+8:00).

August 11, 2021; 2:00 pm	Petro Gazz Angels	3–1	Choco Mucho Flying Titans	Referees: Rene Gaspillo (PHI), Nestor Matimatico (PHI)
August 11, 2021; 2:00 pm	(25–21, 25–15, 22–25, 25–20); P2			Referees: Rene Gaspillo (PHI), Nestor Matimatico (PHI)
Petro Gazz leads series, 1–0

August 12, 2021; 2:00 pm	Choco Mucho Flying Titans	0–3	Petro Gazz Angels	Referees: Mark Santos (PHI), Lumer Pajarillo (PHI)
August 12, 2021; 2:00 pm	(20–25, 18–25, 21–25); P2			Referees: Mark Santos (PHI), Lumer Pajarillo (PHI)
Petro Gazz wins series, 2–0

== Finals ==
- All times are Philippine Standard Time (UTC+8:00).

August 11, 2021; 5:00 pm	Chery Tiggo Crossovers	2–3	Creamline Cool Smashers	Referees: Lumer Pajarillo (PHI), Mark Santos (PHI)
August 11, 2021; 5:00 pm	(15–25, 21–25, 25–18, 25–19, 7–15); P2			Referees: Lumer Pajarillo (PHI), Mark Santos (PHI)
Creamline leads series, 1–0

August 12, 2021; 5:00 pm	Creamline Cool Smashers	1–3	Chery Tiggo Crossovers	Referees: Erlindo Eusebio (PHI), Joy de Imus (PHI)
August 12, 2021; 5:00 pm	(18–25, 25–17, 16–25, 21–25); P2			Referees: Erlindo Eusebio (PHI), Joy de Imus (PHI)
Series tied, 1–1

August 13, 2021; 3:00 pm	Creamline Cool Smashers	2–3	Chery Tiggo Crossovers	Referees: Rene Gaspillo (PHI), Lumer Pajarillo (PHI)
August 13, 2021; 3:00 pm	(23–25, 20–25, 25–21, 25–23, 15–8); P2			Referees: Rene Gaspillo (PHI), Lumer Pajarillo (PHI)
Chery Tiggo wins series, 2–1

== Final standings ==
Rank	Team
1st place, gold medalist(s)	Chery Tiggo Crossovers
2nd place, silver medalist(s)	Creamline Cool Smashers
3rd place, bronze medalist(s)	Petro Gazz Angels
4	Choco Mucho Flying Titans
5	Sta. Lucia Lady Realtors
6	Black Mamba Army Lady Troopers
7	PLDT Home Fibr Power Hitters
8	BaliPure Purest Water Defenders
9	Perlas Spikers
10	Cignal HD Spikers

2021 PVL Open champions
Chery Tiggo Crossovers
First title

Team Roster
Gyzelle Sy, Jaja Santiago (c), Jasmine Nabor, Marian Alisa Buitre, Arriane Mae Layug, Mylene Paat, Maika Ortiz, Ma. Shaya Adorador, Justine Dorog, Elaine Kasilag, Dindin Santiago-Manabat, Mary Joy Dacoron, Ria Beatriz Glenell Duremdes, Rachel Anne Austero
Head coach
Aaron Velez

== Awards and medalists ==
=== Individual awards ===
Award	Player	Team	Ref
Conference Most Valuable Player	Jaja Santiago	Chery Tiggo	
Finals Most Valuable Player	Jaja Santiago	Chery Tiggo	
1st Best Outside Spiker	Alyssa Valdez	Creamline	
2nd Best Outside Spiker	Myla Pablo	Petro Gazz	
1st Best Middle Blocker	Ria Meneses	Petro Gazz	
2nd Best Middle Blocker	Jaja Santiago	Chery Tiggo	
Best Opposite Spiker	Kat Tolentino	Choco Mucho	
Best Setter	Jia Morado	Creamline	
Best Libero	Kath Arado	Petro Gazz	

=== Medalists ===
Gold	Silver	Bronze
Chery Tiggo Crossovers Gyzelle Sy; Jaja Santiago (c); Jasmine Nabor; Marian Alisa Buitre; Arriane Mae Layug; Mylene Paat; Maika Ortiz; Ma. Shaya Adorador; Justine Dorog (L); Elaine Kasilag; Dindin Santiago-Manabat; Mary Joy Dacoron; Ria Beatriz Glenell Duremdes (L); Rachel Anne Austero Head coach: Aaron Velez	Creamline Cool Smashers Kyle Angela Negrito; Alyssa Valdez (c); Ella de Jesus (L); Risa Sato; Jeanette Panaga; Michele Theresa Gumabao; Pau Soriano; Kyla Atienza (L); Jia Morado; Celine Elaiza Domingo; Rizza Jane Mandapat; Jema Galanza; Rosemarie Vargas; Tots Carlos Head coach: Tai Bundit	Petro Gazz Angels Ivy Jisel Perez; Jessey Laine De Leon; Mean Mendrez; Grethcel Soltones; Seth Marione Rodriguez; Frances Molina; Kath Arado (L); Mary Remy Joy Palma; Rica Jane Enclona (L); Jerrili Malabanan; Relea Ferina Saet (c); Ria Meneses; Myla Pablo Head coach: Arnold Laniog

== Asian Club Championship ==
The best performing team were invited to take part at the 2021 Asian Women's Club Volleyball Championship. All teams declined to participate. The club which would have accepted the invitation would have to shoulder the associated fees for their participation. A national team side was entered in the club tournament instead.

== Statistics leaders ==
Here are the statistical leaders at the end of the 2021 Premier Volleyball League Open Conference. Note that the list only consists of the players from the final four teams.

Best scorers
Rank	Name	Points
1	Alyssa Valdez	198
2	Kat Tolentino	164
3	Jaja Santiago	163
4	Dindin Santiago-Manabat	150
5	Ria Meneses	137

Best spikers
Rank	Name	%Eff
1	Jaja Santiago	49.80
2	Tots Carlos	42.60
3	Alyssa Valdez	39.34
4	Michele Gumabao	39.01
5	Frances Molina	35.34

Best blockers
Rank	Name	Avg
1	Ria Meneses	1.28
2	Maddie Madayag	0.82
3	Jaja Santiago	0.61
4	Jeanette Panaga	0.57
5	Frances Molina	0.46

Best servers
Rank	Name	Avg
1	Jaja Santiago	0.47
2	Dindin Santiago-Manabat	0.45
3	Ma. Shaya Adorador	0.42
4	Jia Morado	0.41
5	Alyssa Valdez	0.39

Best diggers
Rank	Name	Avg
1	Kath Arado	6.41
2	Denden Lazaro	4.84
3	Ria Beatriz Duremdes	4.53
4	Deanna Wong	3.58
5	Grethcel Soltones	3.36

Best setters
Rank	Name	Avg
1	Jia Morado	7.20
2	Deanna Wong	5.79
3	Relea Ferina Saet	5.77
4	Jasmine Nabor	5.00
5	Ivy Jisel Perez	1.59

Best receivers
Rank	Name	%Succ
1	Kath Arado	52.26
2	Grethcel Soltones	46.71
3	Kyla Atienza	46.01
4	Ria Beatriz Duremdes	45.18
5	Denden Lazaro	42.25

== PVLPC player of the week ==
Week ending	Player	Team	Ref.
July 23	Grazielle Bombita	BaliPure Purest Water Defenders	
July 30	Jovielyn Grace Prado	Sta. Lucia Lady Realtors	
August 7	Jaja Santiago	Chery Tiggo 7 Pro Crossovers	
