= Menta =

Menta may refer to:

== People ==
- Dean Menta (born 1966), American music editor and composer
- Fabio Menta, Italian volleyball coach
- François Menta (1903–1981), French cyclist
- Narciso Ibáñez Menta (1912–2004), Spanish actor
- Richard Menta, American journalist

== Other uses ==
- Menta (drink), a Bulgarian alcoholic drink
- Menta (pistol), make of firearm

== See also ==
- Mentha, a genus of plants
- Pierra Menta
