= Moro Branislav =

Serbian volleyball coach (born 1957)

Personal information
- Full name: Moro Branislav Moca
- Nationality: Serbian
- Born: April 22, 1957 (age 69)

Coaching information
- Previous teams coached
- Years: Teams
- 2014 2015–2016 2015–2016 2016 2016–2017 2016–2017 2018: IMT; Obilić; Red Star; Postar; Radnički; Vizura; Gimnastikos; Deltacons; Al-Hilal; Kazma; Al Ahly; Al Swehly; Minchanka Minsk; North Korea; 4.25 Sports Club; PSL Manila; Foton Tornadoes; Cocolife Asset Managers

Volleyball information
- Position: Head Coach
- Current team: Chinese Taipei (men's)

National team
- Years: Team
- 2015–2016 2019–: Yugoslavia (women's); Zaire (men's); Serbia and Montenegro (women's); Romania (women's); DPR Korea (women's); Chinese Taipei (men's)

Moro Branislav (Serbian Cyrillic: Моро Бранислав; born 22 April 1957) is a Serbian volleyball coach who is the current head coach of the Chinese Taipei men's national volleyball team.

== Coaching career ==
=== Background ===
Branislav, a Level-3 FIVB coach and FIVB instructor, he has coached numerous clubs in various countries such as Belarus, Greece, Kuwait, Libya, North Korea, the Philippines, Romania, Saudi Arabia, and Tunisia. He also coached the national teams of the now defunct Yugoslavia, Zaire, Romania, and North Korea.

He is an instructor at the FIVB - Development Centres.

=== North Korea ===
In 2015, Branislav went to North Korea to coach the volleyball team of the 4.25 Sports Club. He led the team at the 2015 and 2016 Asian Volleyball Club Championships. The club finished at 6th place in Vietnam and 9th place in the Philippines.

He was also appointed as the head coach of the women's national team of North Korea in those years.

=== PSL All Stars ===
In September 2016, Branislav was appointed as the head coach of the PSL Manila, a selection team composed mainly of Philippine Super Liga (PSL) players, that was set to participate at the 2016 FIVB Club World Championship. The management of the team was waiting for Branislav's availability for the replacement of the Japanese coach Shun Takahashi, who was reassigned as the team's first assistant coach. The team finished at 9th place after the championship.

=== Foton Tornadoes ===
Branislav also took charge of the Foton Tornadoes, a club that plays in the Philippine Super Liga, after its former coach Fabio Menta was relieved from his post. His 30-day contract with the team began on October 8, 2016. His contract was then extended until the last day of the year. Branislav renewed his contract with Foton in January 2017.

He led the team to its second championship title at the 2016 PSL Grand Prix, sweeping the finals against Petron. In the 2017 season, however, the club finished with the bronze medal after losing to Petron in the semifinal round. He left the team after his contract expired. He cited better offers from other PSL teams for his decision. Three PSL teams were looking to sign Branislav as their new head coach before the 2018 season started.

=== Cocolife ===
On December 28, 2017, PSL club, Cocolife Asset Managers announced they have signed in Moro Branislav as their head coach. Branislav, who agreed with a 2-year contract, has begun leading the squad at the 2018 PSL Grand Prix Conference. The club finished at 4th place after the championship.

== Club career ==
Club	Seasons	Team
(Serbia and Montenegro) IMT Beograd		Men/Women's Team
(Serbia and Montenegro) Obilić		Men's Team
(Serbia and Montenegro) Red Star		Women's Team
(Serbia and Montenegro) Postar		Women's Team
(Serbia and Montenegro) Radnički		Women's Team
(Serbia and Montenegro) Vizura		Women's Team
(Greece) Gimnastikos		Women's Team
(Romania) NIS		Men's Team
(Romania) Deltacons		Men's Team
(Tunisia) African		Men's Team
(Saudi Arabia) Al-Hilal		Men's Team
(Kuwait) Kazma		Men's Team
(Saudi Arabia) Al Ahly		Men's Team
(Libya) Al Swehly		Men's Team
(Belarus) Minchanka Minsk	2014	Women's Team
(North Korea) 4.25 Sports Club	2015–2016	Women's Team
(Philippines) Foton Tornadoes	2016–2017	Women's Team
(Philippines) Cocolife Asset Managers	2018	Women's Team
Chinese Taipei	2019-2020	Men's National Team

== Personal Information ==
Branislav attended the University of Physical Culture, University of Menadzment, and Higher Coaching School Belgrade.
