= 2016 Philippine Super Liga Grand Prix =

Third indoor conference of the 2016 Philippine Super Liga season

- Duration: October 8 – December 10, 2016
- Teams: 6
- TV partner(s): TV5, AksyonTV, Sports5.ph, Solar Sports

Results
- Champions: Foton Tornadoes
- Runners-up: Petron Blaze Spikers
- Third place: F2 Logistics Cargo Movers
- Fourth place: RC Cola–Army Troopers

Awards
- MVP: Jaja Santiago
- Best OH: Stephanie Niemer; Ariel Usher
- Best MB: Aby Maraño; Maika Ortiz
- Best OPP: Jovelyn Gonzaga; Aiza Maizo-Pontillas
- Best Setter: Kim Fajardo
- Best Libero: Dawn Macandili

PSL Grand Prix chronology
- < 2015 2017 >

PSL conference chronology
- < 2016 All-Filipino 2017 Invitational >

The 2016 Philippine Super Liga Grand Prix (also known as the 2016 Asics Philippine Super Liga Grand Prix due to sponsorship reasons) was the third conference of the 2016 season of the Philippine Super Liga (PSL) and the fourth running of the Grand Prix. The conference took place from October 8 to December 10, 2016.

The league contracted back to six teams as the two debutants from the prior All-Filipino Conference, Amy's Spikers and the Standard Insurance–Navy Corvettes, both left.

The Foton Tornadoes beat the Petron Blaze Spikers in the finals to win their second PSL title.

== Teams ==
2016 Philippine Super Liga Grand Prix
Abbr.	Team	Affiliation	Head coach	Team captain	Imports
CIG	Cignal HD Spikers	Cignal TV, Inc.	(Philippines) Sammy Acaylar	Michelle Laborte	(Puerto Rico) Lynda Morales (United States) Laura Schaudt
FTL	F2 Logistics Cargo Movers	F2 Global Logistics, Inc.	(Philippines) Ramil de Jesus	Cha Cruz	(United States) Sydney Jae Kemper (United States) Hayley Dora Spelman
FOT	Foton Tornadoes	United Asia Automotive Group, Inc.	(Serbia) Moro Branislav	Lindsay Stalzer	(United States) Lindsay Stalzer (United States) Ariel Usher
GEN	Generika Lifesavers	Erikagen, Inc.	(Philippines) Francis Vicente	Wensh Tiu	(Ukraine) Polina Liutikova (Tobago) Darlene Ramdin
PET	Petron Tri-Activ Spikers	Petron Corporation	(Philippines) Shaq Delos Santos	Frances Molina	(United States) Stephanie Niemer (United States) Serena Warner
RCC	RC Cola–Army Troopers	ARC Refreshments Corporation	(Philippines) Sgt. Kungfu Reyes	Tina Salak	(United States) Kierra Holst (United States) Hallie Rose Ripley

== Format ==
Preliminary round

- The preliminary round was a double round-robin tournament, with each team playing two matches against all other teams in their pool for a total of ten matches.
- The top two teams earned a bye to the semifinals while the remaining teams started in the quarterfinals.

Quarterfinals

- The quarterfinals featured single-elimination matches.
- The match-ups were as follows:
  - QF1: #3 vs. #6
  - QF2: #4 vs. #5
- The winners advanced to the semifinals while the losers would play in the fifth-place match.

Semifinals

- The semifinals also featured single-elimination matches.
- The match-ups were as follows:
  - SF1: #1 vs. QF2 winner
  - SF2: #2 vs. QF1 winner
- The winners advanced to the championship match while the losers would play in the third-place match.

Finals

- The third-place and fifth-place matches were single-elimination while the championship was a best-of-three series.
- The match-ups were as follows:
  - Championship: Semifinal round winners
  - Third-place match: Semifinal round losers
  - Fifth-place match: Quarterfinal round losers

== Preliminary round ==
- All times are local Philippine Standard Time–(UTC+08:00)

Pos	Team	Pld	W	L	Pts	SW	SL	SR	SPW	SPL	SPR	Qualification
1	Foton Tornadoes	10	9	1	25	28	9	3.111	500	392	1.276	Semifinals
2	Petron Tri-Activ Spikers	10	8	2	25	27	9	3.000	590	482	1.224	Semifinals
3	F2 Logistics Cargo Movers	10	7	3	20	21	14	1.500	519	507	1.024	Quarterfinals
4	RC Cola–Army Troopers	10	4	6	13	15	20	0.750	446	492	0.907	Quarterfinals
5	Generika Lifesavers	10	1	9	4	9	27	0.333	483	605	0.798	Quarterfinals
6	Cignal HD Spikers	10	1	9	3	8	29	0.276	428	488	0.877	Quarterfinals

Date	Time		Score		Set 1	Set 2	Set 3	Set 4	Set 5	Total	Report
08 Oct	12:30	Generika Lifesavers	0–3	Petron Tri-Activ Spikers	18–25	23–25	14-25			55–50	
08 Oct	17:00	F2 Logistics Cargo Movers	0–3	Foton Tornadoes	18–25	20–25	15–25			53–75	
11 Oct	17:00	Petron Tri-Activ Spikers	3–0	F2 Logistics Cargo Movers	25–17	25–22	25–19			75–58	
11 Oct	19:00	RC Cola–Army Troopers	3–1	Generika Lifesavers	25–17	23–25	25–15	25–19		98–76	
3 Nov	15:00	Foton Tornadoes	3–0	Generika Lifesavers	25–13	25–13	25–17			75–43	
3 Nov	17:00	F2 Logistics Cargo Movers	3–2	Cignal HD Spikers	21–25	25–11	24–26	25–18	15–11	110–91	
3 Nov	19:00	RC Cola–Army Troopers	1–3	Petron Tri-Activ Spikers	23–25	25–23	18–25	19–25		85–98	
5 Nov	12:30	Cignal HD Spikers	1–3	Petron Tri-Activ Spikers	24–26	25–21	13–25	17–25		79–97	
5 Nov	15:00	F2 Logistics Cargo Movers	3–0	Generika Lifesavers	25–20	25–22	25–20			75–62	
5 Nov	17:00	RC Cola–Army Troopers	0–3	Foton Tornadoes	23–25	19–25	21–25			63–75	
8 Nov	15:00	Generika Lifesavers	2–3	Cignal HD Spikers	25–22	19–25	25–21	20–25	4–15	93–108	
8 Nov	17:00	Petron Tri-Activ Spikers	2–3	Foton Tornadoes	18–25	25–23	14–25	25–19	13–15	95–107	
8 Nov	19:00	F2 Logistics Cargo Movers	3–0	RC Cola–Army Troopers	25–21	25–18	25–17			75–56	
10 Nov	15:00	Cignal HD Spikers	1–3	Foton Tornadoes	17–25	21–25	25–16	14–25		77–91	
10 Nov	17:00	Petron Tri-Activ Spikers	3–0	F2 Logistics Cargo Movers	25–22	25–19	25–10			75–51	
10 Nov	19:00	Generika Lifesavers	1–3	RC Cola–Army Troopers	25–20	24–26	20–25	24–26		93–97	
12 Nov	12:30	F2 Logistics Cargo Movers	3–1	Cignal HD Spikers	25–16	25–16	22–25	25–16		97–73	
12 Nov	15:00	Foton Tornadoes	3–0	Generika Lifesavers	25–16	27–25	25–20			77–61	
12 Nov	17:00	RC Cola–Army Troopers	0–3	Petron Tri-Activ Spikers	13–25	18–25	16–25			47–75	
15 Nov	15:00	RC Cola–Army Troopers	3–0	Cignal HD Spikers	25–13	25–15	25–10			75–38	
15 Nov	17:00	Foton Tornadoes	1–3	F2 Logistics Cargo Movers	15–25	25–23	23–25	24–26		87–99	
15 Nov	19:00	Generika Lifesavers	1–3	Petron Tri-Activ Spikers	17–25	16–25	25–22	16–25		74–97	
17 Nov	17:00	F2 Logistics Cargo Movers	3–1	Generika Lifesavers	25–17	25–27	25–19	25–14		100–77	
17 Nov	19:00	Cignal HD Spikers	0–3	Petron Tri-Activ Spikers	18–25	20–25	17–25			55–75	
19 Nov	12:30	Generika Lifesavers	3–0	Cignal HD Spikers	25–15	25–20	25–22			75–57	
19 Nov	15:00	RC Cola–Army Troopers	2–3	Foton Tornadoes	20–25	25–20	27–29	25–21	7–15	104–110	
22 Nov	17:00	Cignal HD Spikers	0–3	Foton Tornadoes	19–25	14–25	16–25			49–75	
22 Nov	19:00	F2 Logistics Cargo Movers	3–0	RC Cola–Army Troopers	25–13	25–21	25–11			75–45	
24 Nov	17:00	RC Cola–Army Troopers	3–0	Cignal HD Spikers	25–16	25–9	25–23			75–48	
24 Nov	19:00	Petron Tri-Activ Spikers	1–3	Foton Tornadoes	25–22	18–25	22–25	14–25		79–97	

== Playoffs ==
Quarterfinals (single-elimination)
4	RC Cola–Army	3
5	Generika	0
3	F2 Logistics	3
6	Cignal	1

Semifinals (single-elimination)
1	Foton	3
4	RC Cola–Army	2
2	Petron	3
3	F2 Logistics	2

Championship (best-of-three)
1	Foton	3	3	–
2	Petron	2	1	–

=== Quarterfinals ===
Date	Time		Score		Set 1	Set 2	Set 3	Set 4	Set 5	Total	Report
27 Nov	13:00	F2 Logistics	3–1	Cignal	25–17	25–16	22–25	25–10		97–68	
27 Nov	15:00	RC Cola-Army	3–0	Generika	25–20	25–19	25–19			75–58	

=== Semifinals ===
Date	Time		Score		Set 1	Set 2	Set 3	Set 4	Set 5	Total	Report
3 Dec	10:00	Foton	3–2	RC Cola-Army	23–25	23–25	25–22	25–15	15–7	111–94	
3 Dec	17:00	Petron	3–2	F2 Logistics	25–23	23–25	17–25	25–22	15–10	105–105	

=== Fifth place match ===
Date	Time		Score		Set 1	Set 2	Set 3	Set 4	Set 5	Total	Report
3 Dec	15:00	Generika	3–0	Cignal	25–10	25–20	27–25			77–55	

=== Third place match ===
Date	Time		Score		Set 1	Set 2	Set 3	Set 4	Set 5	Total	Report
8 Dec	17:00	RC Cola-Army	2–3	F2 Logistics	13–25	20–25	25–20	25–20	16–18	99–108	

=== Championship ===
Date	Time		Score		Set 1	Set 2	Set 3	Set 4	Set 5	Total	Report
8 Dec	19:00	Petron	2–3	Foton	25–20	25–21	22–25	17–25	9–15	98–106	–
10 Dec	17:00	Foton	3–1	Petron	25–20	25–20	22–25	25–16		97–81	

== Final standing ==
Rank	Team
1st place, gold medalist(s)	Foton Tornadoes
2nd place, silver medalist(s)	Petron Blaze Spikers
3rd place, bronze medalist(s)	F2 Logistics Cargo Movers
4	RC Cola–Army Troopers
5	Generika Lifesavers
6	Cignal HD Spikers

Qualified for the 2017 Asian Club Volleyball Championship

2016 Philippine Super Liga Grand Prix
Champions

2nd title

Team roster
1.) Rhea Dimaculangan
2.) Cherry Ann Rondina
3.) Jaja Santiago
4.) Patty Orendain
5.) Kara Acevedo
6.) Ariel Usher
8.) Angeli Araneta
9.) Ivy Perez
10.) Maika Angela Ortiz
11.) Bia General
12.) Carol Ann Cerveza
15.) Lindsay Stalzer (c)
16.) Aleona Denise Santiago-Manabat
18.) Ennajie Laure

Head coach:
Moro Branislav

=== Individual awards ===
Award		Name/Team
MVP		(Philippines) Jaja Santiago (Foton)
Best Outside Spiker	1st:	(United States) Stephanie Niemer (Petron)
Best Outside Spiker	2nd:	(United States) Ariel Usher (Foton)
Best Middle Blocker	1st:	(Philippines) Aby Maraño (F2 Logistics)
Best Middle Blocker	2nd:	(Philippines) Maika Ortiz (Foton)
Best Opposite Spiker	1st:	(Philippines) Jovelyn Gonzaga (RC Cola-Army)
Best Opposite Spiker	2nd:	(Philippines) Aiza Maizo-Pontillas (Petron)
Best Setter		(Philippines) Kim Fajardo (F2 Logistics)
Best Libero		(Philippines) Dawn Macandili (F2 Logistics)

== Venues ==
- Filoil Flying V Centre
- Philsports Arena

== Broadcast partners ==
- TV5, AksyonTV, Sports5.ph
- Solar Sports
