= Lindsay Stalzer =

American volleyball player

Personal information
- Full name: Lindsay Marie Stalzer
- Born: July 25, 1984 (age 42); Peoria, Illinois, United States
- Hometown: Kewanee, Illinois
- Height: 185 cm (6 ft 1 in)
- Weight: 70 kg (150 lb)
- Spike: 280 cm (110 in)
- Block: 277 cm (109 in)
- Education: Bradley University

Volleyball information
- Position: Opposite hitter
- Current club: San Diego Mojo
- Number: 17

Career
Years	Teams
2007	Aguadilla Divas
2007	Stella ES Calais
2008	Valeriano Alles Menorca Volei
2009	Cala de Finestrat
2010	OK Nova KBM Branik
2011–2013	Sagres Neuchatel
2013	Allianz MTV Stuttgart
2014	Cignal HD Spikers
2014	3BB Nakornnont
2015	Foton Tornadoes
2016	HPK Naiset
2016	Foton Tornadoes
2017	Petron Blaze Spikers
2018	Petron Blaze Spikers
2019	Jakarta BNI 46
2019	F2 Logistics Cargo Movers
2020	F2 Logistics Cargo Movers

National team
2021–	United States
Medal record
Women's volleyball
Representing United States
Pan-American Cup
Bronze medal – third place	2021 Santo Domingo
- Last updated: February 2024

Lindsay Stalzer (born 25 July 1984) is an American volleyball player who plays for the San Diego Mojo of the Pro Volleyball Federation.

She won the 2008-2009 Spanish Cup second place, 2011-2012 Swiss League runner up with Sagres Neuchatel, 2015 Thai-Denmark Super League second place with 3BB Nakornnont. In the Philippine Super Liga she won the 2014 Grand Prix first Best Outside Spiker and the 2015 Grand Prix Most Valuable Player and league title. She won the 2016 Finnish League championship with HPK Naiset and the 2017 Indonesian Proliga with Jakarta Elektrik PLN.

== Personal life ==
Stalzer was born on 25 July 1984 in Peoria, Illinois. She has a Bachelor of Science in Mechanical Engineering from Bradley University. She is 185 cm (6 ft 1 in) tall 70 kilograms (150 lb).

She was state champion in high jump in 2002 and silver medalist in long jump from 2000 to 2002. She was chosen as the muse of a popular basketball team in the Philippine Basketball Association.

== Career ==
Stalzer signed her first professional contract with the Puerto Rican club Aguadilla Divas for the 2007 season. The Spanish club Valeriano Alles Menorca Volei signed Stalzer for the 2008–2009 season to perform as an outside hitter. After the appointed Brazilian coach Emmanuel Haele was unable to enter Spain as he lacked a work permit and later had to be replaced because of the time-consuming bureaucratic procedures, she was instructed to obtain it to avoid the same situation. Her club won the silver medal in the 2008-2009 Spanish Cup after losing in the final to CAV Murcia 2005. She also helped her club to win the Spanish Superliga third place. After the season spent in Menorca, she played the 2009–2010 season with the Spanish club Cala de Finestrat.

For the 2010/11, Stalzer moved to Slovenia to play with Nova KBM Branik Maribor, having a fourth-place finish in the Middle European Volleyball Zonal Association League, MEVZA League, she then signed with the Swiss club Sagres Neuchatel, playing with them the 2011-12 CEV Cup, succeeding in the first round against the Serbian Radnički Belgrado but being defeated by the Greek AEK Atene. She returned with Sagres Neuchatel for the 2012–13 season, playing the 2012–13 CEV Cup defeating Irmato Weert from Netherlands, but lost to the Austrian Askö Linz-Steg in the 1/8 finals, as well as a fourth place in the league. The German club Allianz MTV Stuttgart was the home for Stalzer for the 2013–14.

=== 2014–2015 ===
In 2014, Stalzer played in the Philippines for the Cignal HD Spikers in the season ending 2014 PSL Grand Prix Conference. Even though she was awarded 1st Best Outside Spiker, her club only managed to rank fourth.

After her first Philippine experience, Stalzer travelled to Thailand to join 3BB Nakornnont where she helped the club to a Thailand League fourth-place finish, and leading the team as captain, a runner-up finish in the 2015 Thai-Denmark Super League. Stalzer went back to the PSL in December 2015, this time with the Foton Tornadoes helping the club to their first ever championship and was named Most Valuable Player.

=== 2016 ===
Starting 2016, Stalzer played for the Finnish club HPK Naiset where she helped the squad to the championship, beating LP Viesti after a best-of-five series. She then returned to the Philippines with the club Foton Pilipinas for the 2016 Asian Club Championship. A back injury forced Stalzer to miss a couple of important matches against Vietnam and Japan. The team ended the tournament in 7th place. Stalzer later joined Foton Tornadoes in the 2016 PSL Grand Prix Conference, as the time that she was also included in the PSL-F2 Logistics Manila team that will see action in the FIVB Volleyball Club World Championship. She was inducted into the Bradley University Hall of Fame.

=== 2017 ===
Stalzer joined the Indonesian league club Jakarta Elektrik PLN, experience that she described a warm one thanks to the local environment and that she had previously heard about the Indonesian volleyball league. She suffered a knee injury before the semifinals, but could help her team to end that round unbeaten, winning with her club the local championship. In September, Stalzer returned to the Philippine Superliga, joining the Petron Blaze Spikers for the 2017 PSL Grand Prix Conference in October 2017. The team placed 2nd in the tournament and Stalzer was awarded the 2nd Best Outside Spiker.

2018

She returned to the Philippines and played for Petron for a second year in the 2018 Philippine Super Liga Grand Prix. The team finished 1st in the tournament and Stalzer was named the Most Valuable Player.

2019

She played in the Philippines again for the 6th time in the 2019 Philippine Super Liga Grand Prix, with a new team, the F2 Logistics Cargo Movers. In the best-of-three finals series, her team including Venezuelan Outside Hitter María José Perez went up against her previous team Petron and its guest players former teammate Stephanie Niemer (during the 2016 FIVB World Club Championship) and Khat Bell. Despite winning the first game, the team eventually lost the next two matches, thus losing the championship series and finishing 2nd in the tournament.

=== 2020 ===
She traveled back to the United States when the Philippines League closed in March 2020. She was in third place among attackers and fifth among the scorers and her team was leading the league.

=== 2021 ===
Stalzer played in the athlete-centric Athletes Unlimited Volleyball League based in the United States, experience that she defined as a dream come true. She ended up in the twelfth place with 2745 points, winning US$10,000 for the season in addition to bonuses, helping charities and having her own Topps trading card. She ended up in the twelfth place with 2745 points, She then played at the Puerto Rican League, Stalzer was chosen to play the League All-Star Game, but her Reinforcements team lost 0-2 to the Native All-Stars. She played with Grises de Humacao during the regular season, Leonas de Ponce for the quarterfinals and Valencianas de Juncos for the semifinals before leaving the tournament due to an injury spiking controversy for the quick recover she had that allow her to play with her national team and how easy it is to replace a player in the league.

She then was selected to play under guidance of Joe Trinsey with the United States national team at the NORCECA Championship, and she debuted with the National Team finishing in fourth place after losing 2-3 the Bronze medal game to Canada She helped her national team to win the Pan-American Cup when they defeated 3-0 to the Canadian team. The outside hitter tied in 14th place among top scorers with 45 points, 35 attacks, one block and nice ace serves. She ranked tenth among the attackers with 33.02 success percent and tied fifth in the serving category with her 9 aces.

2022

She returned to the Philippines and played for F2 Logistics in the 2022 Premier Volleyball League Reinforced Conference. The team finished 6th in the tournament. When asked if she will return again, she said "We will see."

== Clubs ==
- (Puerto Rico) Aguadilla Divas (2007)
- (France) Stella ES Calais (2007–2008)
- (Spain) Valeriano Alles Menorca Volei (2008–2009)
- (Spain) Cala de Finestrat (2009–2010)
- (Slovenia) Nova KBM Branik Maribor (2010–2011)
- (Switzerland) Sagres Neuchatel (2011-2013)
- (Germany) Allianz MTV Stuttgart (2013–2014)
- (Philippines) Cignal HD Spikers (2014)
- (Thailand) 3BB Nakornnont (2015)
- (Philippines) Foton Tornadoes (2015)
- (Finland) HPK Naiset (2016)
- (Philippines) Foton Pilipinas (2016)
- (Philippines) PSL-F2 Logistics Manila (2016)
- (Philippines) Foton Tornadoes (2016)
- (Indonesia) Jakarta Elektrik PLN (2017)
- (Philippines) Petron Blaze Spikers (2017)
- (Philippines) Petron Blaze Spikers (2018)
- (Indonesia) Jakarta BNI 46 (2019)
- (Philippines) F2 Logistics Cargo Movers (2019)
- (United States) Bring It Promotions (2019)
- (Philippines) F2 Logistics Cargo Movers (2020)
- (United States) Athletes Unlimited Volleyball (2021)
- (Puerto Rico) Grises de Humacao (2021)
- (Puerto Rico) Leonas de Ponce (2021)
- (Puerto Rico) Valencianas de Juncos (2021)
- (United States) Athletes Unlimited Volleyball (2022)
- (Philippines) F2 Logistics Cargo Movers (2022)
- (Cyprus) Property Gallery Apollon (2022–2023)
- (United States) Athletes Unlimited Volleyball (2023)
- (United States) San Diego Mojo (2024–present)

== Awards ==
=== Individuals ===
- 2014 Philippine Super Liga Grand Prix "1st Best Outside Spiker"
- 2015 Philippine Super Liga Grand Prix "Most valuable player"
- 2017 Philippine SuperLiga Grand Prix "2nd Best Outside Spiker"
- 2018 Philippine Super Liga Grand Prix "Most valuable player"
- 2019 VTV9 Cup VTV Binh Dien International Women's Volleyball Cup "Most valuable player"
- 2021 Puerto Rican League "All-Star"

=== Clubs ===
- 2008-09 Spanish Cup – Runner-Up, with Valeriano Alles Menorca Volei
- 2008-09 Spanish League – Bronze medal, with Valeriano Alles Menorca Volei
- 2011-12 Swiss League – Runner-Up, with Sagres Neuchatel
- 2015 Thai-Denmark Super League – Runner-Up, with 3BB Nakornnont
- 2015 Philippine Super Liga Grand Prix – Champion, with Foton Tornadoes
- 2016 Finnish League - Champion, with HPK Naiset
- 2016 Philippine Super Liga Grand Prix – Champion, with Foton Tornadoes
- 2017 Indonesian Proliga – Champion, with Jakarta Elektrik PLN
- 2017 Philippine SuperLiga Grand Prix – Runner-Up, with Petron Blaze Spikers
- 2018 Philippine SuperLiga Grand Prix – Champion, with Petron Blaze Spikers
- 2019 Indonesian Proliga - 3rd place, with Jakarta BNI 46
