= San Francisco Signal =

American volleyball team

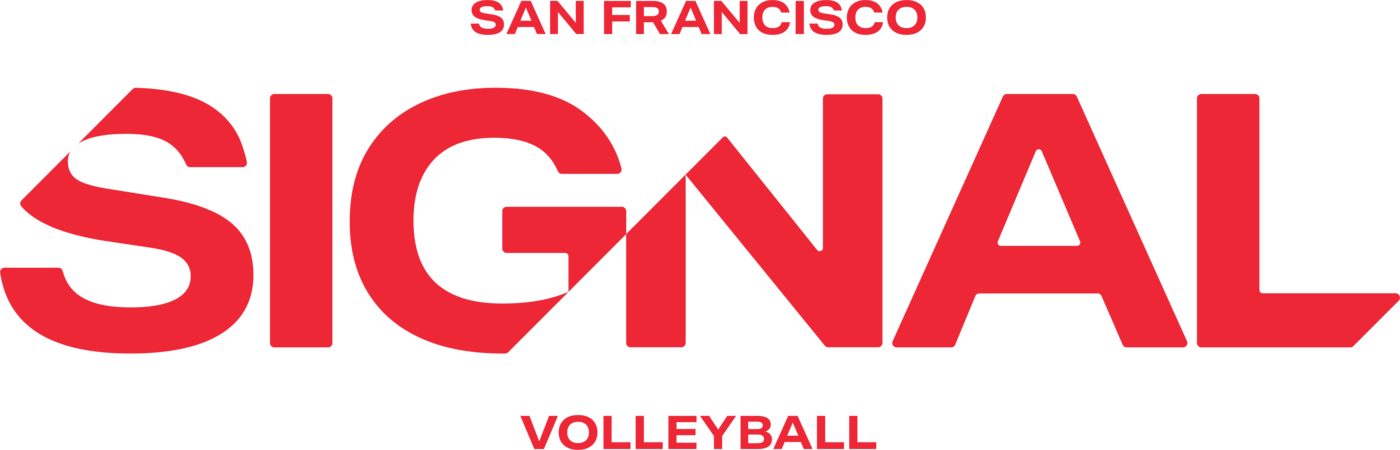
- Full name: San Francisco Signal Volleyball
- Founded: 2025
- Ground: Bill Graham Civic Auditorium (Capacity: 4,000)
- League: LOVB Pro
- Website: www.sanfranciscosignal.com

The San Francisco Signal is an American professional women's indoor volleyball team based in Bay Area in California. It is a member of LOVB Pro, with Signal set to debut in the league in January 2027.

== History ==
The San Francisco Signal was established by a women-led group as the LOVB San Francisco in December 2025 with the team being the ninth team to join the LOVB Pro league. Stephanie Martin was appointed as the inaugural club president in January 2026.

On July 8, 2026, the current name of the club San Francisco Signal was unveiled to the public. The club is the first team to adopt an original name among the LOVB Pro clubs.

Signal is expected to debut in the 2027 season of the LOVB Pro.

== Team image ==
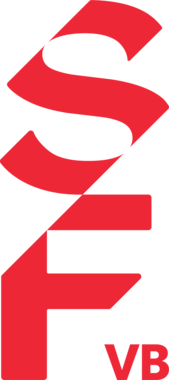
Simplified logo.

The San Francisco Signal's name was selected via a vote by fans and was unveiled in July 2026. "Signal" outbest two other finalist names: Swell and Tide. The team's branding was made by co-owners and studio 72andSunny uses three main colors in its branding: "Siren Red" which references the Golden Gate Bridge, "First Light Cream" which is derived from San Francisco's fog and "Horizon Blue" which represents the body of water and sky of the Bay Area region.

== Names ==
- LOVB San Francisco (2025–2026)
- San Francisco Signal (2026–)

== Roster ==
As of July 18, 2026.

No.	Name	Position	Height	College / home club	Country of Origin/Hometown
	Halimatou Bah	Outside Hitter	6 ft 1 in (1.85 m)	IFVB (France)	France
	Carter Booth	Middle Blocker	6 ft 7 in (2.01 m)	Minnesota / Wisconsin	United States
	Giorgia Faraone	Libero	5 ft 6 in (1.68 m)	Bocconi	Italy
	Kari Geissberger	Opposite Hitter	6 ft 7 in (2.01 m)	LMU / Oklahoma	United States
	Serena Gray	Middle Blocker	6 ft 2 in (1.88 m)	Penn State / Pittsburgh	United States
	Pornpun Guedpard	Setter	5 ft 8 in (1.73 m)	Rattana Bundit	Thailand
	Julia Haggerty	Middle Blocker	6 ft 2 in (1.88 m)	Boston	United States
	Kara Hallock	Outside Hitter	6 ft 2 in (1.88 m)	Washington	United States
	Madeline Haynes	Outside Hitter	6 ft 4 in (1.93 m)	Cal Berkeley	United States
	Allison Jacobs	Outside Hitter	5 ft 11 in (1.80 m)	Michigan	United States
	Sachi “Jaja” Minowa	Middle Blocker	6 ft 5 in (1.96 m)	National U (Philippines)	Philippines
	Ella May Powell	Middle Blocker	6 ft 0 in (1.83 m)	Washington	United States
	Kelsey Cook	Outside Hitter	6 ft 2 in (1.88 m)	Tennessee / Nebraska	United States
	Wang Mengjie	Libero	5 ft 8 in (1.73 m)	Beijing Sport	China
