= Jaja Santiago =

Japanese volleyball player (born 1996)

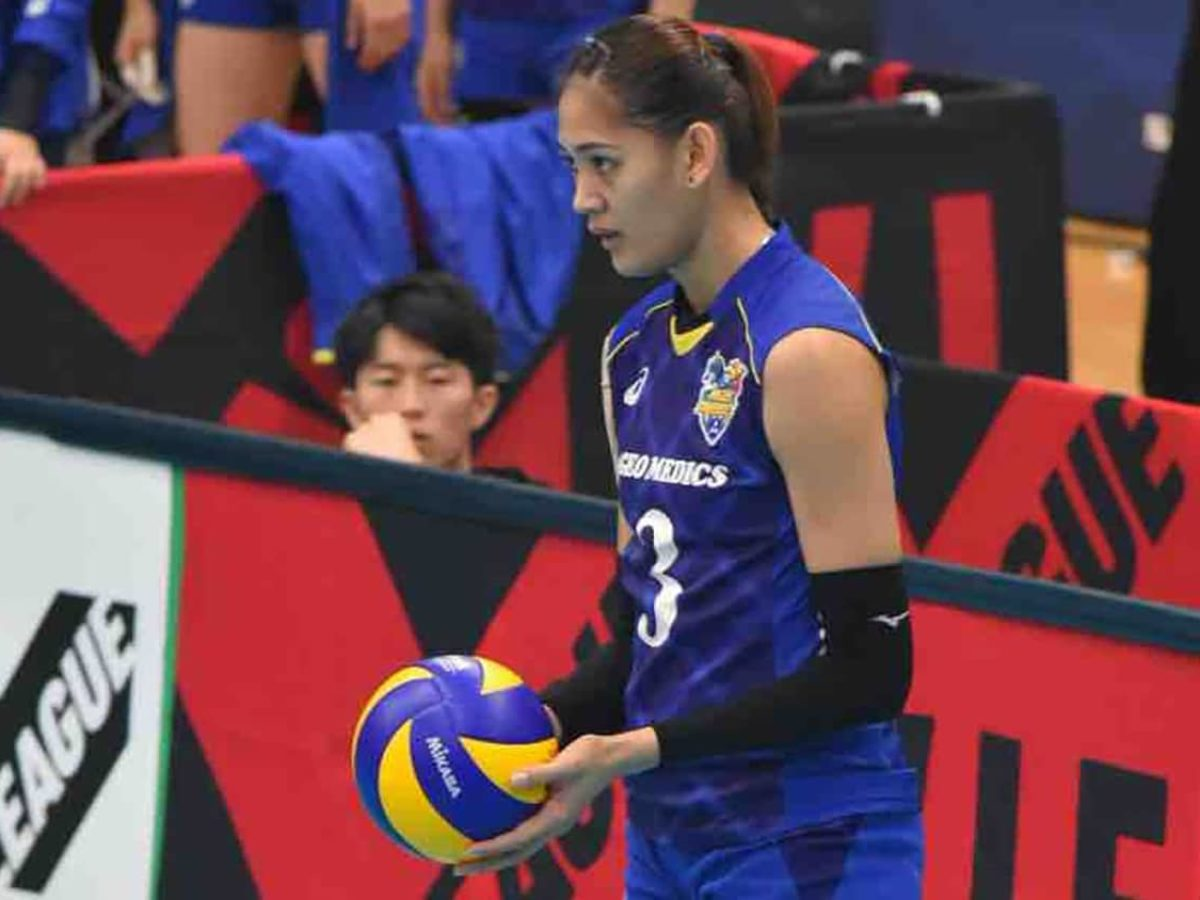
- Santiago playing for Ageo Medics in 2020

Personal information
- Full name: Sachi Minowa
- Nickname: Jaja
- Nationality: Japanese
- Born: Alyja Daphne Antonio Santiago; January 20, 1996 (age 30) Cavite City, Philippines
- Home town: Tanza, Cavite
- Education: National University
- Height: 1.95 m (6 ft 5 in)
- Weight: 74 kg (163 lb)
- Spike: 320 cm (126 in)
- Block: 305 cm (120 in)

Volleyball information
- Position: Middle blocker
- Current club: Creamline Cool Smashers

Career
- Years: Team
- 2014–2015: PLDT Home Ultera
- 2015–2018: Foton Tornadoes
- 2018–2019: Saitama Ageo Medics
- 2019: Foton Tornadoes
- 2019–2021: Saitama Ageo Medics
- 2021: Chery Tiggo
- 2022–2023: Saitama Ageo Medics
- 2023–2025: Osaka Marvelous
- 2025–2026: Denso Airybees
- 2026: Creamline Cool Smashers
- starting 2027: San Francisco Signal

National team
- Years: Team
- 2014–2022: Philippines

Sachi Minowa (蓑輪 幸, Minowa Sachi; born Alyja Daphne Antonio Santiago on January 20, 1996), commonly known as Jaja Santiago (Note: Also known as Jaja Santiago-Minowa), is a Filipina volleyball player who is a middle blocker for the San Francisco Signal of the United States' LOVB Pro. A naturalized Japanese citizen, she played for the Philippines national team.

== Early life and education ==
Jaja Santiago was born on January 20, 1996 in Cavite City, Philippines but grew up in the town of Tanza, Cavite. Santiago was born to sportspeople–her father Jojo Santiago was a former basketball player while her mother Alma Antonio was former volleyball player. Her parents separated after her birth, with Jaja and her four other siblings.

The siblings were raised by their maternal grandparents, Victorio Jr. and Luz Antonio. Jaja Santiago studied at Amaya Elementary School.

She took up volleyball when she was 13-years old, while she was tagging along with her older sister Dindin of the UST Growling Tigresses. The younger Santiago is being encouraged to join the basketball team of Amaya School of Home Industry, a vocational high school. UST coach, Vince Mangulabnan encouraged the younger Santiago to be a volleyball player.

Santiago received an offer to study at the University of California, Los Angeles. She eventually attended the National University in Manila. She obtained a bachelor's degree in psychology in 2020 at NU, two years after her stint in the UAAP.

== Career ==
=== College ===
Santiago, then an incoming freshman student entering the National University (NU) in Manila, received an offer to try out for the University of California-Los Angeles' women's volleyball team in 2013. She declined as she was hesitant to be away from her family back in the Philippines. She went on to play for the NU Lady Bulldogs volleyball team in the University Athletic Association of the Philippines (UAAP).

Santiago led the Bulldogs to win back-to-back championships in the Shakey's V-League 13th Season Collegiate Conference without her sister Dindin to support her, despite that, she was crowned as the Conference Most Valuable Player award and the Best Middle Blocker. She was also crowned as the Most Valuable Player in the 2016 Philippine Super Liga Grand Prix in a back-to-back win with the Foton Tornadoes.

She started her rookie collegiate volleyball career with the UST Golden Tigresses, with her sister Dindin before transferring to National University to follow her sister. After being transferred from UST to the NU Lady Bulldogs, Santiago, now in her 4th year, served as the team captain. She was undecided if she was going to use her fifth and final year, after being eliminated by the UST Golden Tigresses in the UAAP Season 79 Women's Volleyball.

She holds the record of the youngest player to ever play in Shakey's V-League. She joined NU as Guest Player in Season 7 Conference 2 at the age of 14. She also holds the record of the tallest player so far in the Shakey's V-League as she stands 6'5".

=== Club ===
==== Foton Tornadoes (2015–2018) ====
Her first professional team, the Foton Tornadoes, debuted in the 2015 Grand Prix Conference of the Philippine Super Liga (PSL) and played for 3 conferences (2015 Philippine Super Liga Grand Prix, 2016 Philippine Super Liga All-Filipino and 2016 Philippine Super Liga Grand Prix).

In 2017, Santiago won the Premier Volleyball League 1st Season Collegiate Conference championship with the NU Lady Bulldogs and was named the conference MVP. Also winning the bronze medal in the PSL Grand Prix Conference with the Foton Tornadoes along with the 1st Best Opposite Spiker award.

==== PSL All Stars ====
Santiago was part of the PSL All Stars selection team formed to represent the hosts of the 2016 FIVB Club World Championship which was held in Manila.

==== Ageo Medics (2018–2019) ====
Santiago joined Ageo Medics of Japan's V.League in 2018 for the 2018–19 season.

==== Foton Tornadoes (2019) ====
Santiago returned the Philippines to feature for the Foton Tornadoes in the 2019 PSL All-Filipino Conference. Following the conclusion of the tournament, she returned to Japan to play for Ageo Medics again.

==== Ageo Medics (2019–2021) ====
Santiago helped Ageo Medics clinch a bronze medal finish in the 2019–20 Division 1.

Santiago renewed her contract with Ageo Medics in August 2020 She went on to help Ageo Medics win the Division 1 V.Cup title, which was the first for Santiago with a foreign club. after she was unable to rejoin Foton, which renamed themselves as Chery Tigo, for the 2020 PSL Grand Prix which was cancelled due to the COVID-19 pandemic.

Shortly after, Santiago bared that Ageo Medics has convinced her to change her citizenship to Japanese through naturalization which would enable the club to field her as a local. However, Santiago was non-committal and maintained that she still has pride in being a Filipino citizen.

==== Chery Tiggo ====
Her contract with Ageo Medics expired after her 2021 V.Cup stint. Santiago returned to the Philippines to play for the Chery Tiggo 7 Pro Crossovers, which has transferred from the PSL to the newly fully-professionalized Premier Volleyball League (PVL). She rejected offer to play for a club in Taiwan so she could play for Chery in the PVL.

==== Ageo Medics (2022–2023) ====
Santiago returned once again to Japan to suit up for Ageo Medics for the 2022–23 V.League season. However, in May 2023, she announced that she had not re-signed with the team ending her roughly five year series of stints with Ageo Medics.

==== Osaka Marvelous (2023–2025) ====
Santiago remains in Japan as she signs to play for JT Marvelous for the 2023–24 season. Starting the 2024–25 season, Santiago started playing for the team as Sachi Minowa reflecting her new citizenship. The team which joined the SV.League also renamed itself as Osaka Marvelous. Osaka won the 2024–25 season.

==== Denso Airybees (2025–2026) ====
After her long stint with JT Marvelous, Santiago signed with Denso Airybees. She played for the club in the 2025–26 season.

==== Creamline Cool Smashers and San Francisco Signal stint (2026–) ====
Santiago announced that she was set to move to the United States after playing for the Airybees. On June 19, 2026, LOVB Pro announced that they have signed Santiago. Under the league structure, Santiago was assigned to one of LOV Pro's clubs. The San Francisco Signal included Santiago to their roster for their inaugural 2027 season.

Meanwhile, Santiago is set to play first in the Philippines with the Creamline Cool Smashers at the 2026 PVL Invitational Conference before suiting up for Signal. Despite becoming a Japanese citizen, Santiago remains eligible to play as a local rather than an import in the PVL. Creamline finished fourth after losing to the PLDT High Speed Hitters in the bronze medal game.

=== National team ===
Santiago was also a member of the Philippine national team that played in Singapore during the 2015 Southeast Asian Games, as well as in Kuala Lumpur during the 2017 Southeast Asian Games. She last played for the national team in 2022 at the 2021 Southeast Asian Games, which was held in Vietnam.

While playing in Japan, Santiago was called up by the Japan Volleyball Association on March 8, 2024 to join the Japanese national team's training camp, although she was not yet a naturalized Japanese citizen at the time.

In April 2024, Santiago trained with the 26-member Japan women’s national volleyball training pool with Melissa Valdez of the PFU BlueCats until April 30 for the Volleyball Nations League and the 2024 Paris Olympics.

Despite obtaining Japanese citizenship by August 2024, Santiago remains ineligible to play for the Japanese national team due to a newly imposed regulation by the FIVB in May 2024; since she has played for the Philippine national team already her "federation of origin" remains to be Philippines. The Philippine National Volleyball Federation reportedly appealed to the FIVB to allow Santiago to play for Japan at the 2024 Paris Olympics. Santiago remains eligible to play for the Philippine national team on the basis of her federation of origin despite her Japanese citizenship and passport.

== Personal life ==
Santiago comes from a family of sportspeople. Her father Jojo was a basketballer who played for the University of Manila Hawks and the San Juan Knights in the now defunct Metropolitan Basketball Association. Her older sister Dindin Santiago-Manabat also grew up to be a professional volleyball player. Her older brother Axel has coached the National University (NU) Bulldogs volleyball teams. Her younger brother Lenard played basketball for the Letran Squires junior team. Her father died in 2014. Their mother worked as an overseas Filipino worker in Israel.

Santiago is married to Japanese coach Taka Minowa of Ageo Medics since August 2022. She previously had Chery teammate Maika Ortiz as her girlfriend. Santiago announced that they had ended their relationship in July 2022.

In January 2023, reportedly also began the process of acquiring Japanese citizenship for herself. However, she clarified that nothing is certain and is considering opportunities outside of Japan. She has received an offer from her club Ageo Medics to help her acquire Japanese citizenship as early as April 2021, which would make her eligible to play for the Japanese national team.

On August 17, 2024, Santiago announced on her Instagram account that she had finally obtained her Japanese citizenship under the name Sachi Minowa.

== Clubs ==
- (Philippines) PLDT Home Telpad Turbo Boosters/Ultera Ultra Fast Hitters (2014–2015)
- (Philippines) Foton Tornadoes (2015–2019)
- (Japan) Ageo Medics (2018–2023)
- (Philippines) Chery Tiggo 7 Pro Crossovers (2021)
- (Japan) JT Marvelous (2023–2025)
- (Japan) Denso Airybees (2025–2026)
- (Philippines) Creamline Cool Smashers (2026–)
- (United States) San Francisco Signal (starting 2027)

== Awards ==
=== Individuals ===
- 2010 UAAP Season 72 Girls' Volleyball "Rookie of the Year"
- 2012 UAAP Season 75 Girls' Volleyball "Best attacker"
- 2013 UAAP Season 76 "Rookie of the Year"
- 2014 Shakey's V-League 11th Season Open Conference "Best attacker"
- 2015 UAAP Season 77 "Best attacker"
- 2015 Shakey's V-League 12th Season Open Conference "Finals' Most Valuable Player"
- 2015 Shakey's V-League 12th Season Open Conference "2nd Best Middle Blocker"
- 2015 Philippine Superliga Grand Prix "2nd Best Middle Blocker"
- 2016 Shakey's V-League 13th Season Open Conference "1st Best Middle Blocker"
- 2016 Shakey's V-League 13th Season Collegiate "Conference's Most Valuable Player"
- 2016 Shakey's V-League 13th Season Collegiate Conference "1st Best Middle Blocker"
- 2016 UAAP Season 78 "Best attacker"
- 2016 Philippine Superliga All-Filipino "2nd Best Middle Blocker"
- 2016 Philippine Superliga Grand Prix "Most valuable player"
- 2017 UAAP Season 79 "Best attacker"
- 2017 UAAP Season 79 "Best scorer"
- 2017 UAAP Season 79 "Best blocker"
- 2017 Philippine Superliga All-Filipino "Best opposite spiker"
- 2017 Premier Volleyball League 1st Season Collegiate Conference "Conference's Most Valuable Player"
- 2017 Philippine Superliga Grand Prix "1st Best Opposite Spiker"
- 2018 UAAP Season 80 "Season's Most Valuable Player"
- 2018 UAAP Season 80 "Best attacker"
- 2019 Philippine Superliga All-Filipino "1st Best Middle Blocker"
- 2021 Premier Volleyball League Open Conference "2nd Best Middle Blocker"
- 2021 Premier Volleyball League Open Conference "Conference's Most Valuable Player"
- 2021 Premier Volleyball League Open Conference "Finals' Most Valuable Player"
- 2021-2022 Japanese V.League Division 1 "Best Blocker"
- 2022-2023 Japanese V.League Division 1 "Best Middle Blocker"

=== Clubs ===
- 2015 Shakey's V-League 1st Conference – Champion, with PLDT Home Ultera Ultra Fast Hitters
- 2015 Philippine Super Liga Grand Prix Conference – Champion, with Foton Tornadoes
- 2016 Philippine Super Liga All-Filipino Conference – Runner-Up, with Foton Tornadoes
- 2016 Philippine Super Liga Grand Prix Conference – Champion, with Foton Tornadoes
- 2017 Philippine Super Liga Grand Prix Conference – Bronze medal, with Foton Tornadoes
- 2019–20 V.League Division 1 – Bronze medal, with Ageo Medics
- 2020–21 V.Cup – Champion, with Ageo Medics
- 2021 Premier Volleyball League Open Conference – Champion, with Chery Tiggo Crossovers
- 2024–25 SV.League – Champion, with Osaka Marvelous

=== Special recognition ===
- 2014 FIVB Volleyball Women's World Championship qualification (AVC) "Miss Volleyball"
- 2021-2022 Japanese V.League Division 1 "Fair Play Award"
- 2022-2023 Japanese V.League Division 1 "Fair Play Award"
