= Maika Ortiz =

Filipino volleyball player (born 1991)

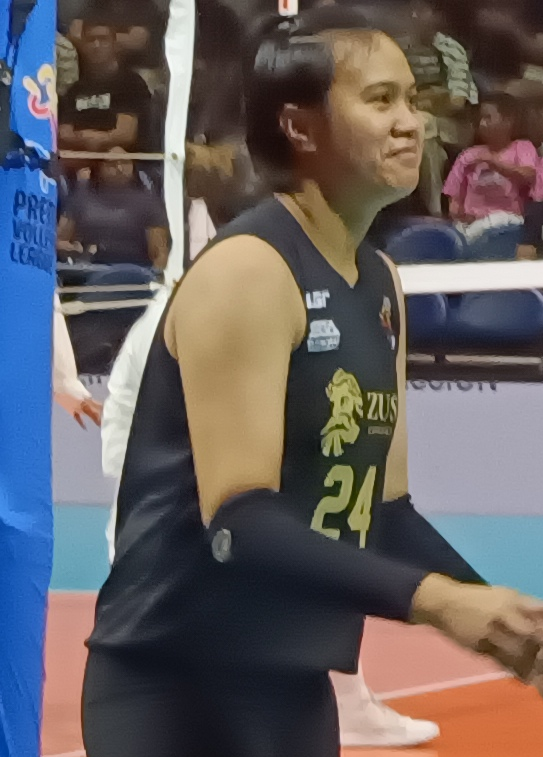
- Ortiz in 2025

Personal information
- Full name: Maika Angela Ortiz
- Born: August 30, 1991 (age 35); Solano, Nueva Vizcaya, Philippines.
- Height: 5 ft 10 in (1.78 m)
- Weight: 70 kg (150 lb)
- Spike: 290 cm (110 in)
- Block: 285 cm (112 in)
- Education: University of Santo Tomas

Volleyball information
- Position: Middle Blocker

Career
Years	Teams
2014–2015	Air Force
2016–2019	Foton Tornadoes
2020–2022	Chery Tiggo Crossovers
2022–2025	Choco Mucho Flying Titans
2025–2026	Zus Coffee Thunderbelles

National team
2015–2018	Philippines

Maika Angela Ortiz (born August 30, 1991) is a Filipino former professional volleyball player.

Ortiz played for the University of Santo Tomas Golden Tigresses in college where she won a UAAP title in Season 72 (2009–10).

She has played for various clubs throughout her career including the Philippine Air Force in and the Foton Tornadoes in the Philippine Super Liga; the Chery Tiggo Crossovers,Choco Mucho Flying Titans and Zus Coffee Thunderbelles of the Premier Volleyball League. She has also played for Philippines national team from 2015 to 2018. She retired from volleyball in September 2026.

== Early life ==
Maika Angela Ortiz was born on August 30, 1991 in Solano, Nueva Vizcaya, Philippines.

== Career ==
=== College ===
Ortiz played for the UST Golden Tigresses in the University Athletic Association of the Philippines (UAAP) on her college years from Seasons 71 to 74 (2008–2012). The Season 72 team won the women's volleyball titel. She won the Best Attacker award in Season 74.

=== Club ===
==== Philippine Air Force ====
She played for the Philippine Air Force Volleyball Team in the Shakey's V-League. Ortiz also suited up for Air Force in the 2014 All-Filipino Conference and 2015 Grand Prix of the Philippine Super Liga (PSL).

==== Foton Tornadoes ====
By June 2016, Ortiz has moved to the Foton Tornadoes of the PSL ahead of the 2016 All-Filipino Conference. She helped the team win the 2016 PSL Grand Prix and was named second best middle blocker.

Ortiz incurred an anterior cruciate ligament (ACL) injury in August during the 2019 All Filipino Conference.

In January 2020, Foton rebranded as the Chery Tiggo Crossovers ahead of a new season.

==== Chery Tiggo Crossovers ====
Ortiz did not feature for Chery Tiggo Crossovers in the 2020 PSL Grand Prix as she was still recovering from her ACL injury. Meanwhile, the team moved from the PSL to the Premier Volleyball League (PVL) in early 2021.

Ortiz returned from injury, in the 2021 PVL Open Conference which the team won. Ortiz was also named Finals MVP.

==== Choco Mucho Flying Titans ====
Ortiz joined the Choco Mucho Flying Titans in September 2022, ahead of the PVL Reinforced Conference. She joined Choco Mucho at the 2023 VTV Cup in Vietnam where the team finished as bronze medalists.

==== Zus Coffee Thunderbelle ====
The Zus Coffee Thunderbelles signed in Ortiz by May 2025. On September 18, 2026, Ortiz announced her retirement from volleyball.

=== National team ===
Ortiz has played for the Philippines national team under the previously recognized Larong Volleyball sa Pilipinas. She was part of the squad that played in the 2015 SEA Games in Singapore, the 2017 SEA Games in Kuala Lumpur and the 2017 Asian Women's Volleyball Championship in Biñan and Muntinlupa.

She was originally named a reserve player for the 2018 Asian Games in Jakarta and Palembang, but replaced Rhea Dimaculangan who begged off. She once again suited up for the Philippines at the 2018 AVC Cup for Women in Nakhon Ratchasima.

== Personal life ==
Ortiz was previously in a relationship with Chery teammate Jaja Santiago until July 2022.

== Awards ==
=== Individual ===
- 2012 UAAP Season 74 "Best Attacker"
- 2013 Shakey's V-League 10th Season First Conference "Best Blocker"
- 2014 Shakey's V-League 11th Season Open Conference "Best Blocker"
- 2016 PSL Grand Prix Conference "2nd Best Middle Blocker"
- 2021 PNVF Champions League for Women "2nd Best Middle Blocker"

=== Collegiate ===
- 2008 Shakey's V-League 2nd Conference - Silver medal, with UST Golden Tigresses
- 2009 UAAP Season 71 - Bronze medal, with UST Golden Tigresses
- 2009 Shakey's V-League 1st Conference - Champion, with UST Golden Tigresses
- 2009 Shakey's V-League 2nd Conference - Champion, with UST Golden Tigresses
- 2010 UAAP Season 72 - Champion, with UST Golden Tigresses
- 2010 Shakey's V-League 1st Conference - Champion, with UST Golden Tigresses
- 2011 UAAP Season 73 - Silver medal, with UST Golden Tigresses
- 2012 UAAP Season 74 - Bronze medal, with UST Golden Tigresses
- 2012 Shakey's V-League 1st Conference - Silver medal, with UST Golden Tigresses
- 2013 Shakey's V-League 1st Conference - Bronze medal, with UST Golden Tigresses

=== Club ===
- 2014 POC-PSC Philippine National Games Women's Volleyball – Champion, with Philippine Air Force Lady Jet Spikers
- 2016 PSL All-Filipino Conference – Silver medal, with Foton Tornadoes
- 2016 PSL Grand Prix Conference – Champion, with Foton Tornadoes
- 2017 PSL Invitational Cup – Bronze medal, with Foton Tornadoes
- 2017 PSL Grand Prix Conference – Bronze medal, with Foton Tornadoes
- 2018 PSL Grand Prix Conference – Bronze medal, with Foton Tornadoes
- 2021 Premier Volleyball League Open Conference – Champion, with Chery Tiggo Crossovers
- 2021 PNVF Champions League for Women – Silver medal, with Chery Tiggo Crossovers
- 2023 VTV International Women's Volleyball Cup – Bronze medal, with Choco Mucho Flying Titans
- 2023 Premier Volleyball League Second All-Filipino Conference – Silver medal, with Choco Mucho Flying Titans
- 2024 Premier Volleyball League All-Filipino Conference – 1st Runner-Up, with Choco Mucho Flying Titans
