= Dindin Santiago-Manabat =

Filipino volleyball player (born 1993)

Personal information
- Full name: Aleona Denise Antonio Santiago-Manabat
- Nickname: Dindin
- Nationality: Filipino
- Born: Aleona Denise Antonio Santiago; September 26, 1993 (age 33); Tanza, Cavite, Philippines
- Height: 1.88 m (6 ft 2 in)
- Weight: 65 kg (143 lb)
- Spike: 284 cm (112 in)
- Block: 270 cm (106 in)
- Education: National University; University of Santo Tomas

Volleyball information
- Position: Middle blocker / Wing Spiker
- Current club: Choco Mucho Flying Titans

Career
| Years | Teams |
|---|---|
| 2013 | Smart-Maynilad Net Spikers |
| 2014 | PLDT Home Telpad Turbo Boosters |
| 2014–15 | Petron Blaze Spikers |
| 2015–16 | RC Cola-Army Troopers |
| 2016–18 | Foton Tornadoes |
| 2018–19 | Toray Arrows |
| 2019 | Foton Tornadoes |
| 2019–20 | Kurobe AquaFairies |
| 2020–22 | Chery Tiggo 7 Pro Crossovers |
| 2021 | Rebisco Philippines |
| 2022–23 | Nakhon Ratchasima |
| 2023–24 | Akari Chargers |
| 2024–present | Choco Mucho Flying Titans |

National team
| 2013–2018 | Philippines |

Aleona Denise "Dindin" Antonio Santiago-Manabat (born September 26, 1993) is a Filipino professional volleyball player. She played in the UAAP during her collegiate years for the NU Lady Bulldogs and started her professional career in the Philippine Super Liga as the first overall pick in the 2014 season for Petron Blaze Spikers.

== Personal life ==
Dindin Santiago was born on September 26, 1993, the third of five siblings. Her brother (Axel Leonard, a former member of the men's volleyball varsity team of National University "NU Bulldogs") is currently working in PLDT and her older sister is working in Dubai, while she and her sister, Jaja (now Sachi Minowa), are both playing for various women's volleyball club teams in different leagues. Her father, Jojo Santiago, was a former basketball player of the University of Manila while her mother, Alma Antonio, is a caregiver in Israel.

She is married to basketball coach Chico Manabat.

== Career ==
Santiago won the SVL 10th Season 1st, Conference won the Conference Most Valuable Player award, the SVL 10th Season 1st, Conference Conference Most Valuable Player and Best Server. She has also won the SVL 11th Season, 1st Conference Conference Most Valuable Player award and the 2014 PSL Grand Prix 2nd Best Middle Blocker individual award.

She started her rookie collegiate volleyball career with the UST Golden Tigresses, before transferring to National University. After being transferred from UST to the NU Lady Bulldogs, Santiago played for two seasons as the team captain. She is one of the Guest Player especially in Championship match against Cagayan Valley Lady Rising Suns during the 10th Season of Shakey's V - League in the 2013 Open Conference as Smart-Maynilad Net Spikers finished in the second place. She is one of the Guest Player especially in Battle for Bronze match against Philippine Air Force Air Spikers during the 11th Season of Shakey's V - League in Open Conference as she helped PLDT Home Telpad Turbo Boosters to win the match.

Her first professional team, where she was the first draft pick for the 2014 season with Petron Blaze Spikers and debuted in the 2014 All-Filipino Conference of the Philippine Super Liga (PSL). In early December 2015, Santiago took a leave of absence from the sport because of her pregnancy.

First joined as a guest player during the 11th Season, 3rd Conference of the Shakey's V-League. On August 18, 2016, Santiago announced that she will join the Foton Tornadoes for the 2016 Philippine Super Liga Grand Prix Conference, playing alongside her sister, Jaja. She won the bronze medal in the 2017 PSL Grand Prix Conference with the Foton Tornadoes. She is set to play in the Japan V.League for Toray Arrows.

== Clubs ==
- (Philippines) Smart-Maynilad Net Spikers (2013)
- (Philippines) PLDT Home Telpad Turbo Boosters (2014)
- (Philippines) Petron Blaze Spikers (2014-2015)
- (Philippines) RC Cola-Army Troopers (2015–2016)
- (Philippines) Foton Tornadoes (2016–2019)
- (Japan) Toray Arrows (2018–2019)
- (Japan) Kurobe AquaFairies (2019–2020)
- (Philippines) Chery Tiggo 7 Pro Crossovers (2020–2022)
- Rebisco Philippines
- (Thailand) Nakhon Ratchasima (2022–2023)
- (Philippines) Akari Chargers (2023–2024)
- (Philippines) Choco Mucho Flying Titans (2024–present)

== Awards ==
=== Individual ===
- UAAP Season 76 "Best attacker"
- Shakeys V-League 8th Season 1st, Conference "Best blocker"
- Shakeys V-League 10th Season 1st, Conference "Conference Most Valuable Player"
- Shakeys V-League 10th Season 1st, Conference "Best scorer"
- Shakeys V-League 11th Season, 1st Conference "Conference Most Valuable Player"
- Shakeys V-League 11th Season, 1st Conference "Best server"
- 2014 Philippine Super Liga Grand Prix "2nd Best Middle Blocker"
- 2015 Philippine Super Liga All-Filipino "1st Best Middle Blocker"
- 2019 Philippine Super Liga All-Filipino "Best opposite spiker"
- 2021 PNVF Champions League (Women) "2nd Best Outside Spiker"

=== Clubs ===
| Season | Tournament | Club | Title | Ref | | | | |
|---|---|---|---|---|---|---|---|---|
| Season | Tournament | Club | Title | Ref | 2013 | 2013 SVL Open Conference | Smart-Maynilad Net Spikers | Runner-up |
| 2014 | 2014 SVL Reinforced Open Conference | PLDT Home Telpad Turbo Boosters | 3rd Place | | | | | |
| 2014 | 2014 SVL Reinforced Open Conference | Philippine Army Lady Troopers | Runner-up | | | | | |
| 2014 | 2014 Philippine Super Liga Grand Prix Conference | Petron Blaze Spikers | Champions | | | | | |
| 2015 | 2015 Philippine Super Liga All-Filipino Conference | Petron Blaze Spikers | Champions | | | | | |
| 2015 | 2015 Philippine Super Liga Grand Prix Conference | Petron Blaze Spikers | Runner-up | | | | | |
| 2015 | 2015 SVL Open Conference | Philippine Army Lady Troopers | 3rd Place | | | | | |
| 2016 | 2016 Philippine Super Liga Grand Prix Conference | Foton Tornadoes | Champions | | | | | |
| 2017 | 2017 Philippine Super Liga Invitational Cup | Foton Tornadoes | 3rd Place | | | | | |
| 2017 | 2017 Philippine Super Liga Grand Prix Conference | Foton Tornadoes | 3rd Place | | | | | |
| 2018 | 2018 Philippine Super Liga Grand Prix Conference | Foton Tornadoes | 3rd Place | | | | | |
| 2019 | 2019 Philippine Super Liga Grand Prix Conference | Chery Tiggo 7 Pro Crossovers | 3rd Place | | | | | |
| 2021 | 2021 PVL Open Conference | Chery Tiggo 7 Pro Crossovers | Champions | | | | | |
| 2021 | 2021 PNVF Champions League for Women | Chery Tiggo 7 Pro Crossovers | Runner-up | | | | | |
| 2021 | 2021–2022 Thailand League | Nakhon Ratchasima | 3rd Place | | | | | |
