= Foton Tornadoes =

Women's volleyball team in the Philippines

- Short name: Foton
- Nickname: Tornadoes
- Founded: 2014 (first incarnation); 2023 (second incarnation)
- Dissolved: 2020 (first incarnation); 2023 (second incarnation) (Note: Shares history with the Chery Tiggo Crossovers. The original Foton team was renamed as Chery in 2020. Foton would be briefly revived as a separate team apart from Chery for the 2023 PVL Invitational Conference. That Foton team was dissolved after playing in that tournament. The now-disbanded Crossovers consider the original Tornadoes to be their predecessor.)
- League: Philippine Super Liga (2014–2019); Premier Volleyball League (2023)
- 2023 Invitational: 11th place
- Championships: Philippine Super Liga: 2 (2015, 2016)

The Foton Tornadoes was a women's volleyball team owned by United Asia Automotive Group, Inc. (UAAGI). The first incarnation of the team was established in 2014 as a member of the Philippine Super Liga (PSL), winning two championships. The original Tornadoes were rebranded in 2020 into what became the Chery Tiggo Crossovers, which moved to the Premier Volleyball League in 2021.

In 2023, the team was revived as Chery Tiggo's sister team in the Premier Volleyball League (PVL), marking their professional debut. That team only lasted one conference, the 2023 Invitational Conference, before disbanding once more.

== History ==
The team debuted in the Philippine Super Liga (PSL) during the 2014 Grand Prix as Foton Tornadoes.

The original Foton team would be renamed as the Chery Tiggo Crossovers heading the 2020 season. Chery joined the professional PVL in 2021.

In June 2023, the revival of the Foton Tornadoes team was announced. They played with Chery at the 2023 PVL Invitational Conference At least seven Chery players moved to Foton. They have pledged to participate in the PVL for at least the next three years.

The team however withdraw for the succeeding second All-Filipino Conference after several of its players did not have their contracts renewed. The team was revealed to have been temporarily revived to accommodate surplus players from Chery.

== International tournaments ==
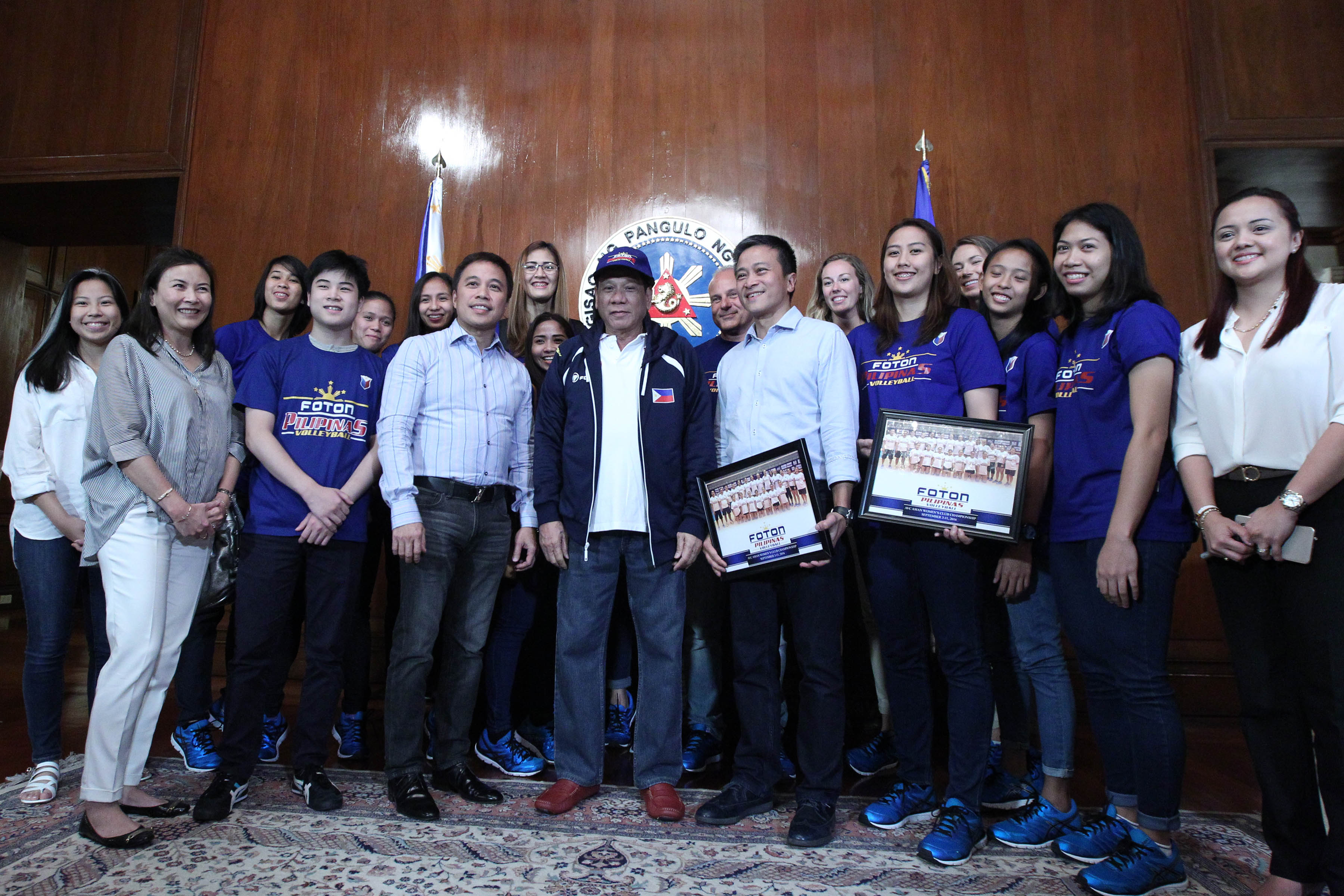
Members of Foton Pilipinas on a courtesy call with President Rodrigo Duterte before participating at the 2016 Asian Women's Club Volleyball Championship.

As the champion of the 2015 PSL Grand Prix, Foton represented the Philippines, playing as Foton Pilipinas, in the 2016 Asian Women's Club Volleyball Championship held in Biñan, Laguna. The team was reinforced by three selected players from other PSL teams as well as imports Lindsay Stalzer and Ariel Usher. Italian coach and FIVB volleyball instructor Fabio Menta was named as head coach of the squad. The team finished in 7th place overall after the 9-day competition.

Having won the 2016 Grand Prix, the team was entered once more to the 2017 edition of the Asian Women's Club Volleyball Championship. However, the club begged off because of its depleted lineup due to player movements and injuries. In its place, the Philippines was represented by the PSL all-star selection (playing as "Rebisco-PSL Manila").

== Name changes ==
Foton Motors (2014 Philippine Super Liga Grand Prix Conference)

Foton Tornadoes (2014–2017)

Foton Toplanders (2016 Invitational Cup)

Foton Pilipinas (2016 Asian Women's Club Volleyball Championship)

Foton Tornadoes Blue Energy (2018–2019)

== Final roster ==
Foton Tornadoes
Number	Player	Position	Height	Birth date	School
1	(Philippines) Carlota Hernandez	Outside Hitter	1.66 m (5 ft 5 in)	April 2, 1999 (age 27)	FEU
2	(Philippines) Jasmine Nabor	Setter	1.75 m (5 ft 9 in)	July 11, 1998 (age 28)	NU
3	(Philippines) Bernadette Flora	Outside Hitter	1.70 m (5 ft 7 in)	August 16, 1998 (age 28)	ADU
5	(Philippines) Jaila Atienza	Middle blocker			UP
7	(Philippines) Seth Marione Rodriguez	Middle blocker	1.79 m (5 ft 10 in)	September 22, 1998 (age 28)	UE
8	(Philippines) May Luna	Outside hitter	1.65 m (5 ft 5 in)	August 2, 1992 (age 34)	DLSU
12	(Philippines) Mary Antonette Landicho	Libero			NU
14	(Philippines) Nerissa Bautista	Opposite Hitter	1.78 m (5 ft 10 in)	October 12, 1985 (age 41)	CPU
15	(Philippines) France Ronquillo	Opposite hitter			NU
16	(Philippines) Sydney Mae Niegos	Middle Blocker			JRU
17	(Philippines) Mary Rhose Dapol	Outside Hitter			UPHSD
22	(Philippines) Babylove Barbon	Libero			UST
23	(Philippines) Ma. Shaya Adorador (C)	Outside hitter	1.72 m (5 ft 8 in)	December 29, 1997 (age 28)	UE
24	(Philippines) Maria Regina Agatha Mangulabnan	Setter			UST

Coaching staff

- Head coach:

Brian Esquibel

- Assistant coaches:

Yani Fernandez
Robertly Boto

Team staff

- Team manager:
- Trainer:

Medical staff

- Physical therapist:

== Season-by-season records ==
=== Domestic league ===
League	Season	Conference	Preliminary round	Final round	Ranking	Source
PSL	2014	Grand Prix	6th (3–7, 9 pts)	Did not qualify Won in fifth place match vs. Mane 'n Tail, 3–2	5th place	
PSL	2015	All-Filipino	3rd (5–5, 16 pts)	Lost in semifinals vs. Shopinas.com, 2–3; Lost in third place match vs. Philips Gold, 2–3	4th place	
PSL	2015	Grand Prix	4th (6–4, 19 pts)	Won in championship vs. Petron, 2–1 (Note: Best-of-three series.)	Champions	
PSL	2016	Invitational	5th (1–4, 3 pts)	Did not qualify	6th place	
PSL	2016	All-Filipino	4th (4–3, 12 pts) (First round); 1st (3–0, 8 pts) (Second round)	Lost in championship vs. F2 Logistics, 1–2	Runner-up	
PSL	2016	Grand Prix	1st (9–1, 25 pts)	Won in championship vs. Petron, 2–0	Champions	
PSL	2017	Invitational	3rd (3–2, 9 pts)	Finished 4th in final round (0–3, 0 pts)	4th place	
PSL	2017	All-Filipino	1st (5–1, 15 pts) (Pool C)	Lost in semifinals vs. Petron, 1–3; Lost in third place match vs. Cignal, 1–3	4th place	
PSL	2017	Grand Prix	3rd (7–1, 20 pts)	Lost in semifinals vs. Petron, 1–3; Won in third place match vs. Cocolife, 3–0	3rd place	
PSL	2018	Grand Prix	4th (5–5, 16 pts)	Lost in semifinals vs. F2 Logistics, 0–2; Won in third place match vs. Cocolife, 3–1	3rd place	
PSL	2018	Invitational	4th (1–3, 4 pts) (Group A)	Did not qualify Won in seventh place match vs. UP–United Auctioneers, 3–0	7th place	
PSL	2018	All-Filipino	4th (6–4, 17 pts)	Lost in quarterfinals vs. Cignal, 1–3	5th place	
PSL	2019	Grand Prix	7th (3–11, 11 pts)	Lost in quarterfinals vs. F2 Logistics in two matches (Note: Opposing team had twice-to-beat advantage.)	7th place	
PSL	2019	All-Filipino	3rd (8–6, 25 pts)	Lost in semifinals vs. F2 Logistics, 1–3; Lost in third place match vs. Petron, 2–3	4th place	
PSL	2019	Invitational	2nd (2–1, 6 pts) (Pool D)	Lost in semifinals vs. Petron, 0–3; Lost in third place match vs. Cignal, 0–3	4th place	
Team spun off to Chery Tiggo Crossovers from 2020 to 2023
PVL	2023	Invitational	5th (1–4, 2 pts) (Pool B)	Did not qualify Won in 11th place match vs. Gerflor, 3–1	11th place	

=== Asian Women's Club Volleyball Championship ===
Year	Preliminary round	Final round	Ranking	Source
2016	2nd (1–1, 4 pts) (Pool A, preliminary round); 4th (0–3, 1 pt) (Pool E, classification round)	Lost in quarterfinals vs. Bayi Shenzhen, 0–3	7th place	

== Individual awards ==
Season	Conference	Award	Name
2015	All-Filipino	2nd Best Outside Spiker	(Philippines) Patty Jane Orendain
2015	Grand Prix	2nd Best Middle Blocker	(Philippines) Jaja Santiago
2015	Grand Prix	1st Best Setter	(Philippines) Ivy Jizel Perez
2015	Grand Prix	Most Valuable Player	(United States) Lindsay Stalzer
2016	All-Filipino	2nd Best Middle Blocker	(Philippines) Jaja Santiago
2016	Grand Prix		
2016	Grand Prix	2nd Best Outside Spiker	(United States) Ariel Usher
2016	Grand Prix	2nd Best Middle Blocker	(Philippines) Maika Ortiz
2016	Grand Prix	Most Valuable Player	(Philippines) Jaja Santiago
2017	Invitational	Best Opposite Spiker	(Philippines) Mary Grace Berte
2017	All-Filipino	1st Best Outside Spiker	(Philippines) Ennajie Laure
2017	All-Filipino	Best Opposite Spiker	(Philippines) Jaja Santiago
2017	Grand Prix	1st Best Opposite Spiker	(Philippines) Jaja Santiago
2018	Grand Prix		
2018	Grand Prix	1st Best Opposite Spiker	(Canada) Elizabeth Ann Wendel
2018	Grand Prix	2nd Best Libero	(Serbia) Katarina Vukomanović
2019	All-Filipino	1st Best Middle Blocker	(Philippines) Jaja Santiago
2019	All-Filipino	Best Opposite Spiker	(Philippines) Dindin Santiago-Manabat
2019	Invitational	2nd Best Outside Spiker	(Philippines) Shaya Adorador
2019	Invitational	Best Libero	(Philippines) Jennylyn Reyes

== Team captains ==
- (Philippines) Jill Gustilo (2014)
- (Philippines) Ivy Remulla (2015)
- (Philippines) Angeli Araneta (2016–2016)
- (United States) Lindsay Stalzer (2016)
- (Philippines) Dindin Santiago-Manabat (2017, 2018)
- (Philippines) Jaja Santiago (2017–2017)
- (Philippines) Maika Angela Ortiz (2018–2019)
- (Philippines) Carmina Aganon (2019)
- (Philippines) Shaya Adorador (2019, 2023)

== Imports ==
Season	Country	Player
2014	Russia	Irina Tarasova
2015	United States	Kathleen Anne Messing
2015	United States	Lindsay Stalzer
2016	United States	Ariel Usher
2016	United States	Lindsay Stalzer
2017	Serbia	Sara Klisura
2017	Montenegro	Dragana Perunicic
2017	Serbia	Katarina Vukomanović
2018	Trinidad and Tobago	Channon Thompson
2018	Canada	Elizabeth Ann Wendell
2018	Serbia	Katarina Vukomanović
2019	Turkey	Selime İlyasoğlu
2019	United States	Courtney Felinski
2019	Spain	Milagros Collar

== Coaches ==
- Ma. Vilet Ponce-de León (2014–2016)
- Fabio Menta (2016; Asian Women's Club Championship)
- Moro Branislav (2016–2017)
- (Philippines) Rommel Abella (2018; PSL Grand Prix)
- (Philippines) Edjet Mabbayad (2018; PSL Invitational)
- (Philippines) Aaron Vélez (2018–2019)
- (Philippines) Brian Esquibel (2023)
