= 2016 Philippine Super Liga All-Filipino Conference =

Second indoor conference of the 2016 Philippine Super Liga season

- Duration: June 18 – August 17, 2016
- Teams: 8
- TV partner(s): AksyonTV / TV5 / Hyper

Results
- Champions: F2 Logistics Cargo Movers
- Runners-up: Foton Tornadoes
- Third place: RC Cola–Army Troopers
- Fourth place: Petron Tri-Activ Spikers

Awards
- MVP: Dawn Macandili
- Best OH: Ara Galang; Bernadeth Pons
- Best MB: Aby Maraño; Jaja Santiago
- Best OPP: Jovelyn Gonzaga
- Best Setter: Kim Fajardo
- Best Libero: Dawn Macandili

PSL All-Filipino Conference chronology
- < 2015 2017 >

PSL conference chronology
- < 2016 Invitational 2016 Grand Prix >
- < 2016 BVCC

The 2016 Philippine Super Liga All-Filipino Conference was the second conference of the 2016 season of the Philippine Super Liga (PSL) and the third running of the All-Filipino Conference. The tournament ran from June 18 to August 17, 2016. Most matches were held at Filoil Flying V Centre and Cuneta Astrodome.

The league expanded to eight member teams with two teams making their debut: Amy's Spikers and the Standard Insurance–Navy Corvettes. Additionally, New San Jose Builders Victorias left after just one conference, with them being replaced by the returning Generika Lifesavers.

The F2 Logistics Cargo Movers defeated the Foton Tornadoes in the finals to win their first PSL title.

== Teams ==
2016 Philippine Super Liga All-Filipino Conference
Abbr.	Team	Affiliation	Head coach	Team captain
AMY	Amy's Spikers	Sonia Trading, Inc.	Michael Molleno	Cindy Imbo (UPHSD)
CIG	Cignal HD Spikers	Cignal TV, Inc.	Sammy Acaylar	Michelle Laborte
FTL	F2 Logistics Cargo Movers	F2 Global Logistics, Inc.	Ramil de Jesus	Cha Cruz
FOT	Foton Tornadoes	United Asia Automotive Group, Inc.	Vilet Ponce de Leon	Angeli Araneta
GEN	Generika Lifesavers	Erikagen, Inc.	Francis Vicente	Rubie de Leon
PET	Petron Tri-Activ Spikers	Petron Corporation	George Pascua	Aiza Maizo-Pontillas
RCC	RC Cola–Army Troopers	ARC Refreshments Corporation	Sgt. Kungfu Reyes	Jovelyn Gonzaga
STA	Standard Insurance–Navy Corvettes	Standard Insurance Company, Inc.	Zenaida Ybañez-Chavez	Janet Serafica

== Format ==
First round

- The preliminary round was split into two rounds.
- The first round was a single round-robin tournament, with each team playing one match against all other teams for a total of seven matches.

Second round

- In the second round, teams were divided into two groups based on standings from the first round. The top four teams were assigned to Group A while the bottom four were assigned to Group B.
- The second round was also a single round-robin, with each team played one match against all other teams for a total of three matches.

Classification bracket

- Group B teams played in the classification bracket. All matches were single-elimination.
- The match-ups were as follows:
  - CL1: B1 vs. B4
  - CL2: B2 vs. B3
  - Seventh-place match: Classification round losers
  - Fifth-place match: Classification round winners

Championship bracket

- Group A teams played in the championship bracket. The semifinal round and third-place matches were single-elimination while the championship was a best-of-three series.
- The match-ups were as follows:
  - SF1: A1 vs. A4
  - SF2: A2 vs. A3
  - Third-place match: Semifinal round losers
  - Championship: Semifinal round winners

== Preliminary round ==
=== First round ===
- All times are local Philippine Standard Time–(UTC+08:00)

Pos	Team	Pld	W	L	Pts	SW	SL	SR	SPW	SPL	SPR	Qualification
1	F2 Logistics Cargo Movers	7	7	0	20	21	4	5.250	605	433	1.397	Assigned to Group A
2	RC Cola–Army Troopers	7	6	1	19	20	4	5.000	576	478	1.205	Assigned to Group A
3	Petron Tri-Activ Spikers	7	5	2	15	16	8	2.000	546	487	1.121	Assigned to Group A
4	Foton Toplanders	7	4	3	12	13	10	1.300	518	464	1.116	Assigned to Group A
5	Cignal HD Spikers	7	2	5	7	9	16	0.563	509	583	0.873	Assigned to Group B
6	Generika Lifesavers	7	2	5	6	9	16	0.563	539	592	0.910	Assigned to Group B
7	Standard Insurance–Navy Corvettes	7	2	5	5	7	18	0.389	519	610	0.851	Assigned to Group B
8	Amy's Kitchen–Perpetual	7	0	7	0	2	21	0.095	408	573	0.712	Assigned to Group B

Date	Time		Score		Set 1	Set 2	Set 3	Set 4	Set 5	Total	Report
18 Jun	14:00	FTL	3–1	CIG	25–12	23–25	25–20	25–11		98–68	P2
18 Jun	16:00	PET	3–0	FOT	25–19	25–17	25–21			75–57	P2
21 Jun	16:00	GEN	3–1	STA	28–26	26–28	25–20	25–19		104–93	P2
21 Jun	18:00	RCC	3–0	AMY	25–19	25–17	25–18			75–54	P2
23 Jun	16:00	GEN	1–3	FOT	11–25	25–22	24–26	21–25		81–98	P2
23 Jun	18:00	AMY	0–3	FTL	13–25	14–25	23–25			50–75	P2
25 Jun	14:00	PET	3–1	GEN	25–19	21–25	25–22	27–25		98–91	P2
25 Jun	16:00	RCC	3–0	CIG	25–17	25–17	25–20			75–54	P2
28 Jun	16:00	FOT	3–0	AMY	25–14	25–7	25–18			75–39	P2
28 Jun	18:00	CIG	0–3	PET	14–25	13–25	25–27			52–77	P2
30 Jun	16:00	FTL	3–0	GEN	25–12	25–16	25–18			75–46	P2
30 Jun	18:00	STA	0–3	RCC	23–25	19–25	14–25			56–75	P2
3 Jul	15:30	FOT	0–3	FTL	11–25	23–25	14–25			48–75	P2
3 Jul	17:30	STA	3–1	AMY	25–21	26–28	25–23	25–20		101–92	P2
13 Jul	16:00	RCC	3–0	PET	25–22	25–23	25–11			75–56	P2
13 Jul	18:00	CIG	2–3	STA	38–36	22–25	25–17	20–25	8–15	113–118	P2
16 Jul	14:00	AMY	1–3	PET	18–25	10–25	25–22	12–25		65–97	P2
16 Jul	16:00	FOT	1–3	RCC	20–25	25–27	25–23	20–25		90–100	P2
16 Jul	18:00	CIG	3–1	GEN	25–21	22–25	25–22	25–18		97–86	P2
17 Jul	14:00	STA	0–3	FTL	23–25	16–25	14–25			53–75	
17 Jul	16:00	FOT	3–0	CIG	25–20	25–21	25–9			75–50	
17 Jul	18:00	GEN	3–0	AMY	25–16	25–23	25–15			75–54	
19 Jul	14:00	FTL	3–1	PET	25–15	19–25	25–19	25–9		94–68	
19 Jul	16:00	GEN	0–3	RCC	13–25	25–27	18–25			56–77	
19 Jul	18:00	STA	0–3	FOT	11–25	22–25	11–25			44–75	
23 Jul	14:30	AMY	0–3	CIG	21–25	12–25	21–25			54–75	
23 Jul	16:30	PET	3–0	STA	25–16	25–18	25–19			75–53	
23 Jul	18:30	RCC	2–3	FTL	22–25	14–25	25–21	28–26	10–15	99–112	

=== Second round ===
==== Group A ====
Pos	Team	Pld	W	L	Pts	SW	SL	SR	SPW	SPL	SPR
1	Foton Toplanders	3	3	0	8	9	3	3.000	275	237	1.160
2	F2 Logistics Cargo Movers	3	2	1	5	7	5	1.400	272	233	1.167
3	Petron Tri-Activ Spikers	3	1	2	4	5	6	0.833	230	242	0.950
4	RC Cola–Army Troopers	3	0	3	1	2	9	0.222	191	256	0.746

Date	Time		Score		Set 1	Set 2	Set 3	Set 4	Set 5	Total	Report
24 Jul	18:00	RCC	0–3	FTL	16–25	12–25	15–25			43–75	
28 Jul	17:00	FOT	3–2	RCC	18–25	25–15	25–17	23–25	15–9	106–91	
28 Jul	19:00	FTL	3–2	PET	25–20	23–25	22–25	25–18	15–8	110–96	
30 Jul	18:00	PET	0–3	FOT	23–25	18–25	18–25			59–75	
31 Jul	16:00	FOT	3–1	FTL	19–25	25–20	25–23	25–19		94–87	
31 Jul	18:00	RCC	0–3	PET	19–25	22–25	16–25			57–75	

==== Group B ====
Pos	Team	Pld	W	L	Pts	SW	SL	SR	SPW	SPL	SPR
1	Generika Lifesavers	3	3	0	9	9	3	3.000	289	236	1.225
2	Cignal HD Spikers	3	2	1	6	7	4	1.750	257	219	1.174
3	Standard Insurance–Navy Corvette	3	1	2	3	4	6	0.667	201	210	0.957
4	Amy's Kitchen–Perpetual	3	0	3	0	2	9	0.222	181	263	0.688

Date	Time		Score		Set 1	Set 2	Set 3	Set 4	Set 5	Total	Report
24 Jul	14:00	STA	3–0	AMY	25–17	25–9	25–14			75–40	
24 Jul	16:00	GEN	3–1	CIG	20–25	25–23	25–23	25–22		95–93	
28 Jul	15:00	AMY	1–3	CIG	25–14	17–25	13–25	14–25		69–89	
30 Jul	14:00	AMY	1–3	GEN	26–24	13–25	19–25	14–25		72–99	
30 Jul	16:00	CIG	3–0	STA	25–15	25–22	25–18			75–55	
31 Jul	14:00	GEN	3–1	STA	25–16	25–17	20–25	25–13		95–71	

== Final round ==
=== Bracket ===
Group B

5th–8th classification (single-elimination)
1	Generika	3
4	Amy's Kitchen–Perpetual	1
2	Cignal	3
3	Standard Insurance–Navy	0

Fifth place match (single-elimination)
1	Generika	3
2	Cignal	2
Seventh place match (single-elimination)
4	Amy's Kitchen–Perpetual	1
3	Standard Insurance–Navy	3

Group A

Semifinals (single-elimination)
1	Foton	3
4	RC Cola–Army	1
2	F2 Logistics	3
3	Petron	0

Championship (best-of-three)
1	Foton	2	3	1
2	F2 Logistics	3	1	3
Third place match (single-elimination)
4	RC Cola–Army	3
3	Petron	2

=== 5th–8th classification ===
Date	Time		Score		Set 1	Set 2	Set 3	Set 4	Set 5	Total	Report
3 Aug	14:00	GEN	3–1	AMY	21–25	25–17	25–23	25–14		96–79	
6 Aug	14:00	CIG	3–0	STA	25–19	25–19	25–21			75–59	

=== Semifinals ===
Date	Time		Score		Set 1	Set 2	Set 3	Set 4	Set 5	Total	Report
3 Aug	16:00	FOT	3–1	RCC	21–25	25–19	25–15	25–21		96–80	
6 Aug	16:00	FTL	3–0	PET	25–18	25–15	25–13			75–46	

=== Seventh place match ===
Date	Time		Score		Set 1	Set 2	Set 3	Set 4	Set 5	Total	Report
7 Aug	14:00	AMY	1–3	STA	13–25	17–25	25–19	9–25		64–94	

=== Fifth place match ===
Date	Time		Score		Set 1	Set 2	Set 3	Set 4	Set 5	Total	Report
7 Aug	16:00	GEN	3–2	CIG	19–25	25–22	25–22	23–25	15–7	107–101	

=== Third place match ===
Date	Time		Score		Set 1	Set 2	Set 3	Set 4	Set 5	Total	Report
10 Aug	16:00	PET	2–3	RCC	18–25	23–25	25–21	25–15	11–15	102–101	P2

=== Championship ===
Date	Time		Score		Set 1	Set 2	Set 3	Set 4	Set 5	Total	Report
10 Aug	18:00	FOT	2–3	FTL	20–25	14–25	25–9	25–20	10–15	94–94	
13 Aug	18:00	FTL	1–3	FOT	25–18	17–25	22–25	18–25		82–93	
17 Aug	19:00	FOT	1–3	FTL	25–18	18–25	21–25	19–25		83–93	

== Final standing ==
Rank	Team
1st place, gold medalist(s)	F2 Logistics Cargo Movers
2nd place, silver medalist(s)	Foton Tornadoes
3rd place, bronze medalist(s)	RC Cola–Army Troopers
4	Petron Tri-Activ Spikers
5	Generika Lifesavers
6	Cignal HD Spikers
7	Standard Insurance–Navy Corvettes
8	Amy's Spikers

=== Individual awards ===
Award		Recipient
MVP		Dawn Macandili (F2 Logistics)
Best Outside Spiker	1st:	Victonara Galang (F2 Logistics)
Best Outside Spiker	2nd:	Bernadeth Pons (Petron)
Best Middle Blocker	1st:	Abigail Maraño (F2 Logistics)
Best Middle Blocker	2nd:	Jaja Santiago (Foton)
Best Opposite Spiker		Jovelyn Gonzaga (RC Cola-Army)
Best Setter		Kim Fajardo (F2 Logistics)
Best Libero		Dawn Macandili (F2 Logistics)

== Venues ==
- Filoil Flying V Arena (main venue)
- Cuneta Astrodome

"Spike on Tour" Venues:

- Batangas City Coliseum (July 19)
- De La Salle Lipa Sentrum (July 28)
- Malolos Sports and Convention Center (August 4)

== Broadcast partners ==
- Sports5: AksyonTV, TV5, Hyper (SD and HD), Sports5.ph

== See also ==
- Shakey's V-League 13th Season Open Conference
- Spikers' Turf 2nd Season Open Conference
