= Jovelyn Gonzaga =

Filipino volleyball player

Personal information
- Nationality: Filipino
- Born: October 31, 1991 (age 34)
- Hometown: Jordan, Guimaras, Philippines
- Height: 5 ft 8 in (1.73 m)
- Weight: 61 kg (134 lb)
- Spike: 273 cm (107 in)
- Block: 274 cm (108 in)
- Education: Central Philippine University

Beach volleyball information
Years	Teammate
2022	Sisi Rondina

Indoor volleyball information
- Position: Opposite hitter
- Current club: Zus Coffee Thunderbelles

Career
Years	Teams
2017–2020	Cignal HD Spikers
2019–2022	Army Black Mamba Lady Troopers
2023	Cignal HD Spikers
2024–present	Zus Coffee Thunderbelles

National team
2015–2019	Philippines
Honours
Women's volleyball
Representing Philippines
FIVB Beach Volleyball World Tour
Gold medal – first place	2022 Subic Bay Future	Women's beach
Southeast Asian Games
Bronze medal – third place	2021 Quảng Ninh	Women's beach
ASEAN Grand Prix
Bronze medal – third place	2019 Nakhon Ratchasima	Team
Bronze medal – third place	2019 Santa Rosa	Team
- Last updated: October 2019

Jovelyn Gonzaga is a Filipino professional volleyball player. She was a member and team captain of Central Philippine University volleyball team. She is currently a member of the Zus Coffee Thunderbelles in the Premier Volleyball League (PVL), in which she plays as an opposite hitter. She is also a member of the Philippines women's national volleyball team.

== Career ==
=== Indoor volleyball ===
Gonzaga became Shakey's V-League Season 10 Open Conference Most Valuable Player in 2013. She would later describe the award as a "pleasant surprise". She played as guest player for FEU Lady Tamaraws in 2014.

Gonzaga was chosen Shakey's V-League 12th Season Open Conference best opposite spiker, Shakey's V-League 12th Season Collegiate Conference best opposite spiker and Shakey's V-League 12th Season Reinforced Open Conference Conference MVP & Best Opposite Spiker.

She was the team captain of Philippines women's national volleyball team that competed in the 2015 Southeast Asian Games.

In 2024, Gonzaga signed with the Zus Coffee Thunderbelles. Zus Coffee reached its first-ever final in the 2025 PVL Reinforced Conference which is also Gonzaga's first final as a professional player.

=== Beach volleyball ===
At the Volleyball World Beach Pro Tour, Gonzaga played with Sisi Rondina in the Subic Bay Future during the 2022 season. They won the gold medal for that tournament.

== Awards ==
=== Individuals ===
- Shakey's V-League Season 10 Open Conference "Most valuable player"
- Shakey's V-League Season 10 Open Conference "Best attacker"
- Shakey's V-League 11th Season Open Conference "Finals Most Valuable Player"
- Shakey's V-League 11th Season Reinforced Open Conference "Best attacker"
- Shakey's V-League 12th Season Open Conference "Best opposite spiker"
- Shakey's V-League 12th Season Collegiate Conference "Best opposite spiker"
- Shakey's V-League 12th Season Reinforced Open Conference "Most valuable player"
- Shakey's V-League 12th Season Reinforced Open Conference "Best opposite spiker"
- 2016 Philippine Super Liga Invitational "Most valuable player"
- 2016 Philippine Super Liga All-Filipino "Best opposite spiker"
- 2016 Philippine Super Liga Grand Prix "Best opposite spiker"
- 2017 Philippine Super Liga Invitational "Most valuable player"

=== Pro Beach Tour ===
- 1 medal – (1 gold)

No.	Result	Date	Category	Venue	Partner	Opponents	Score		
1.	Gold	11 Dec 2022	Future	Olongapo (Subic Bay), Philippines	Sisi Rondina	(Philippines) Rodriguez / Eslapor	22–24	21–12	15–12
