= Fabio Menta =

Italian volleyball player and coach

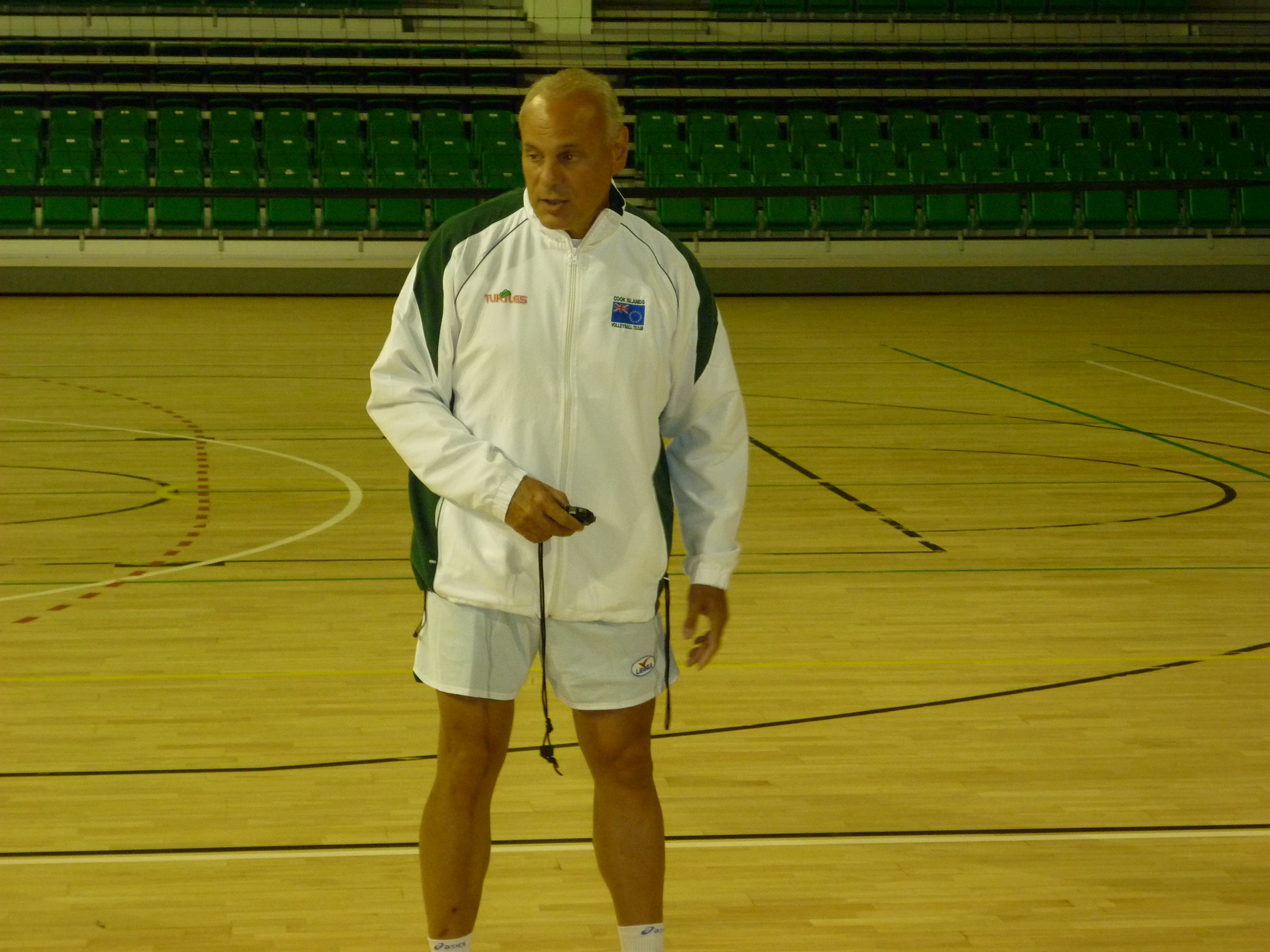
- Menta with the Cook Islands national team

Personal information
- Nationality: Italian
- Born: 1 January 1962 (age 64); Syracuse, Sicily, Italy

Coaching information
- Current team: Foton Pilipinas
Previous teams coached
Years	Teams
1996-1997; 1997-2000; 1998-1999; 2000-2001; 2000-2001; 2003-2004; 2005-2006; 2006-2007; 2007-2008; 2008; 2008-2009; 2010-2011; 2012-2014; 2015-2016; 2016	Nassau Sunburners; Nassau Texaco Stars; Bahamas (men); Caffè dell'Opera Diablos; Bahamas (women); Tecnoservice Siracusa; Arenella Resort Siracusa; Ste.Mi Rovigo; Ticinocom Bellinzona; Sigger Viterbo; Punto 4 Pallavolo Reggio Emilia; Cook Islands (women); De Gasperi Potenza; Cook Islands; Foton Pilipinas

Career
Years	Teams
1980-1983	CUS Siena Volley
1997-1999	Nassau Texaco Stars

Fabio Menta is an Italian coach and former player who last coached the Foton Tornadoes which competed as the Foton Pilipinas at the 2016 Asian Women's Club Volleyball Championship.

Menta has also coached the women's national team of the Cook Islands. He was hired by the Foton Tornadoes in August 2016 to lead them at the 2016 Asian Women's Club Volleyball Championship where they competed as "Foton Pilipinas". Menta led Foton at the 2016 Select Tuna Thailand Volleyball Championship, which was part of the club's preparation for the Asian club stint.

He resigned from Foton on 24 September 2016.
