= Philippine Super Liga draft =

The Philippine Super Liga (PSL) draft was an annual event in the league's calendar during the 2014, 2015 and 2016 seasons in which teams can acquire new players outside the league which are not free agents in an agreed-upon order. The first two drafting procedures (2014 and 2015) were held at the SM Aura at the Bonifacio Global City in Taguig.

== 2014 First Round draft picks ==
Pick	Player	Position	Nationality	Team	College
1	Dindin Santiago	Middle Hitter	Philippines	Petron Blaze Spikers	NU
2	Abigail Maraño	Middle Hitter	Philippines	AirAsia Flying Spikers	DLSU
3	Iari Yongco	Utility Hitter	Philippines	RC Cola Raiders	DLSU-D
4	Janine Marciano	Open Hitter	Philippines	Cagayan Valley Lady Rising Suns	SBC
5	Jamenea Ferrer	Setter	Philippines	PLDT Home TVolution Power Attackers	ADMU
6	Norie Jane Diaz	Open Hitter	Philippines	Cignal HD Spikers	UPHSD
7	Christine Agno	Libero	Philippines	Generika-Army Lady Troopers	FEU

== 2015 First Round draft picks ==
Pick	Player	Position	Nationality	Team	College
1	Iris Janelle Tolenada	Setter	United States	Philips Gold Lady Slammers	San Francisco State
2	Angeli Pauline Araneta	Middle Blocker	Philippines	Foton Tornadoes	UP
3	Rica Jane Enclona	Libero	Philippines	Cignal HD Spikers	CSB
4	Rizza Jane Mandapat	Opposite Spiker	Philippines	Shopinas.com Lady Clickers	NU
5	Maureen Veronas	Opposite Spiker/ Outside Hitter	Philippines	Mane 'n Tail Lady Stallions	CSB
6	Alexa Micek	Opposite Spiker	United States	Petron Blaze Spikers	NC State

== 2016 First Round draft picks ==
Pick	Player	Position	Nationality	Team	College
1	Victonara Galang	Open Hitter	Philippines	F2 Logistics Cargo Movers	DLSU
2	Christine Joy Rosario	Middle Blocker	Philippines	Petron Tri-Activ Spikers	Arellano
3	Renelyn Raterta	Setter	Philippines	Amy's Kitchen-Perpetual	UM
4	Geneveve Casugod	Open Hitter	Philippines	Generika Lifesavers	FEU
5	Mary Grace Berte	Open Hitter	Philippines	Cignal HD Spikers	HCDC
6	Danna Henson	Open Hitter	Philippines	Foton Toplanders	Arellano
7	Jonah Sabete	Open Hitter	Philippines	Standard Insurance-Navy	BulSU
