= 2015 Philippine Super Liga Grand Prix =

Second indoor conference of the 2015 Philippine Super Liga season

- Duration: October 10 – December 5, 2015
- Teams: 6
- TV partner(s): TV5, AksyonTV, Sports5.ph, Solar Sports

Results
- Champions: Foton Tornadoes
- Runners-up: Petron Blaze Spikers
- Third place: Philips Gold Lady Slammers
- Fourth place: Cignal HD Spikers

Awards
- MVP: Lindsay Stalzer
- Best OH: Ariel Elizabeth Usher; Bojana Todorovic
- Best MB: Alexis Olgard; Jaja Santiago
- Best OPP: Michele Gumabao; Frances Molina
- Best Setter: Ivy Perez; Erica Adachi
- Best Libero: Jennylyn Reyes

PSL Grand Prix chronology
- < 2014 2016 >

PSL conference chronology
- < 2015 All-Filipino 2016 Invitational >
- < 2015 BVCC

The 2015 Philippine Super Liga Grand Prix was second conference of the 2015 season of the Philippine Super Liga (PSL) and the third running of the Grand Prix. The conference ran from October 10 to December 5, 2015.

After debuting in the 2015 Beach Volleyball Challenge Cup, the Meralco Power Spikers made their indoor volleyball debut. Additionally, the RC Cola-Air Force Raiders made their return after a hiatus in the previous conference. On the other hand, two teams had left, the Mane 'n Tail Lady Stallions and the Shopinas.com Lady Clickers.

Stav Jacobi, FIVB Executive Council member and chief organizer of the FIVB World Women's Club Volleyball Championship, was the guest of honor for the opening ceremony, while Prajaya Chaiyakam, the deputy managing director of SMMTV, Asian Volleyball Confederation (AVC)'s official TV partner, and his cameraman went to Cuneta Astrodome to witness Game 1 of the PSL Finals.

The tournament was won by the Foton Tornadoes, earning their first title, after defeating two-time defending champions Petron Blaze Spikers in the finals. Foton would represent the Philippines at the 2016 Asian Women's Club Volleyball Championship.

== Video challenge system ==
The PSL became the third Southeast Asia-based volleyball club league (after Thailand and Vietnam) to utilize the video challenge system allowing teams to challenge and decide crucial calls during the games for a fair and balanced officiating, as part of the full compliance to the FIVB rules. The system, reportedly worth ₱3 million, courtesy of Italy-based Data Volley (composed of machine and 26 high-definition cameras to be beamed through a giant LED screen provided by Sports5 inside the venue) arrived on October 26, 2015 and used on October 27, 2015, during the second round of the tournament. Emmanuel Celle of the Data Volley spearheaded the project.

The video challenge was officially launched two days later with Cignal's coach Sammy Acaylar being the first to use the video challenge system, block touch during first set of their match against Foton. The system was available for the games held within the venues in Metro Manila and in the Spike on Tour event in Imus, Cavite.

== Teams ==
2015 Philippine Super Liga Grand Prix
Abbr.	Team	Affiliation	Head coach	Team captain
CIG	Cignal HD Spikers	Cignal TV, Inc.	Sammy Acaylar	Michelle Laborte
FOT	Foton Tornadoes	United Asia Automotive Group, Inc.	Ma. Vilet Ponce de Leon	Ivy Elayne Remulla
MER	Meralco Power Spikers	Manila Electric Company	Ramil de Jesus	Cha Cruz
PET	Petron Blaze Spikers	Petron Corporation	George Pascua	Maica Morada
PHG	Philips Gold Lady Slammers	Federated Distributors, Inc.	Francis Vicente	Michele Gumabao
RCC	RC Cola–Air Force Raiders	ARC Refreshments Corporation	Rhovyl Verayo	Judy Ann Caballejo

== Imports ==
On October 25, 2015, PVF president Edgardo "Boy" Cantada, condemned the act of the LVPI and Score (headed by Ramon Suzara, the president of PSL, and one of the masterminds in the withdrawal of recognition of PVF in the POC, AVC, and FIVB) over the incident involving 12 imports who have gone through the immigration process and play in the league without any necessary working permits and other documents of foreigners who will work in the country. He also criticized LVPI and Suzara for blatant disregard and abuse of the Philippine immigration and labor laws over the incident.

Team	Import 1	Import 2
Cignal HD Spikers	(United States) Amanda Anderson	(United States) Ariel Usher
Foton Tornadoes	(United States) Katie Messing	(United States) Lindsay Stalzer
Meralco Power Spikers	(United States) Christina Alessi	(Estonia) Liis Kullerkann
Petron Blaze Spikers	(Brazil) Erica Adachi	(Brazil) Rupia Inck Furtado
Philips Gold Lady Slammers	(United States) Alexis Olgard	(United States) Bojana Todorovic
RC Cola–Air Force Raiders	(United States) Sarah McClinton	(Puerto Rico) Lynda Morales

== Format ==
Classification round

- The classification round was a double round-robin tournament, with each team playing two matches against all other teams in their pool for a total of ten matches.
- The top four teams advanced to the semifinals while the remaining teams were eliminated.

Semifinals

- The semifinals featured single-elimination matches.
- The match-ups were as follows:
  - SF1: #1 vs. #4
  - SF2: #2 vs. #3
- The winners advanced to the championship while the losers would play in the third-place match.

Finals

- The championship was a best-of-three series while the third-place was single-elimination.
- The match-ups were as follows:
  - Championship: Semifinal round winners
  - Third-place match: Semifinal round losers

== Classification round ==
Pos	Team	Pld	W	L	Pts	SW	SL	SR	SPW	SPL	SPR	Qualification
1	Philips Gold Lady Slammers	10	8	2	22	27	14	1.929	930	865	1.075	Semifinals
2	Petron Blaze Spikers	10	7	3	21	26	15	1.733	923	831	1.111	Semifinals
3	Cignal HD Spikers	10	7	3	20	23	17	1.353	866	829	1.045	Semifinals
4	Foton Tornadoes	10	6	4	19	23	15	1.533	838	767	1.093	Semifinals
5	Meralco Power Spikers	10	1	9	5	9	27	0.333	735	839	0.876	Fifth place match
6	RC Cola–Air Force Raiders	10	1	9	3	9	29	0.310	747	908	0.823	Fifth place match

Date	Time		Score		Set 1	Set 2	Set 3	Set 4	Set 5	Total	Report
10 October	13:00	Cignal HD Spikers	3–2	Petron Blaze Spikers	18–25	17–25	25–15	25–18	16–14	101–97	P2
10 October	15:00	Meralco Power Spikers	0–3	Foton Tornadoes	23–25	22–25	16–25	–	–	61–75	P2
13 October	16:15	Petron Blaze Spikers	3–0	Meralco Power Spikers	25–15	25–14	25–19	–	–	75–48	P2
13 October	18:15	Cignal HD Spikers	3–2	Philips Gold Lady Slammers	15–25	25–15	25–17	19–25	16–14	100–96	P2
15 October	16:15	RC Cola–Air Force Raiders	3–2	Meralco Power Spikers	25–20	17–25	20–25	25–21	15–13	102–104	P2
15 October	18:15	Petron Blaze Spikers	3–2	Foton Tornadoes	21–25	25–20	25–13	12–25	15–9	98–92	P2
17 October	13:00	Cignal HD Spikers	3–0	Meralco Power Spikers	25–17	25–18	25–17	–	–	75–52	P2
17 October	15:00	Philips Gold Lady Slammers	3–2	Petron Blaze Spikers	25–20	21–25	16–25	25–22	15–12	102–104	P2
20 October	16:15	RC Cola–Air Force Raiders	1–3	Petron Blaze Spikers	22–25	20–25	25–21	10–25	–	77–96	P2
20 October	18:15	Meralco Power Spikers	1–3	Philips Gold Lady Slammers	19–25	25–21	25–27	23–25	–	92–98	P2
22 October	16:15	Philips Gold Lady Slammers	3–2	RC Cola–Air Force Raiders	23–25	20–25	25–21	25–21	15–8	108–100	P2
22 October	18:15	Foton Tornadoes	1–3	Cignal HD Spikers	20–25	19–25	25–16	23–25	–	87–91	P2
25 October	13:15	RC Cola–Air Force Raiders	1–3	Cignal HD Spikers	19–25	26–24	23–25	17–25	–	85–99	P2
25 October	15:15	Philips Gold Lady Slammers	3–2	Foton Tornadoes	25–18	26–24	22–25	23–25	15–13	111–105	P2
27 October	16:15	Foton Tornadoes	3–0	RC Cola–Air Force Raiders	25–14	25–13	25–16	–	–	75–43	P2
27 October	18:15	Petron Blaze Spikers	3–2	Cignal HD Spikers	25–16	14–25	25–17	22–25	15–13	101–96	P2
29 October	16:15	Foton Tornadoes	3–0	Cignal HD Spikers	25–17	25–19	25–18	–	–	75–54	P2
29 October	18:15	RC Cola–Air Force Raiders	1–3	Petron Blaze Spikers	23–25	27–25	15–25	13–25	–	78–100	P2
5 November	16:00	Philips Gold Lady Slammers	1–3	Foton Tornadoes	13–25	22–25	25–18	18–25	–	78–93	P2
5 November	18:00	Meralco Power Spikers	0–3	Petron Blaze Spikers	25–27	20–25	21–25	–	–	66–77	P2
7 November	13:00	Meralco Power Spikers	0–3	Philips Gold Lady Slammers	12–25	24–26	19–25	–	–	55–76	P2
7 November	15:00	Cignal HD Spikers	3–1	RC Cola–Air Force Raiders	25–19	20–25	25–10	25–19	–	95–73	P2
10 November	16:00	Foton Tornadoes	3–2	Meralco Power Spikers	25–18	18–25	14–25	25–16	15–8	97–92	P2
10 November	18:00	RC Cola–Air Force Raiders	0–3	Philips Gold Lady Slammers	26–28	19–25	15–25	–	–	60–78	P2
12 November	16:00	Philips Gold Lady Slammers	3–0	Cignal HD Spikers	25–22	25–14	25–23	–	–	75–59	P2
12 November	18:00	RC Cola–Air Force Raiders	0–3	Foton Tornadoes	21–25	21–25	19–25	–	–	61–75	P2
14 November	13:00	Petron Blaze Spikers	3–0	Foton Tornadoes	27–25	25–23	25–16	–	–	77–64	P2
14 November	15:00	Meralco Power Spikers	3–0	RC Cola–Air Force Raiders	25–21	28–26	25–21	–	–	78–68	P2
16 November	16:00	Philips Gold Lady Slammers	3–1	Petron Blaze Spikers	28–30	29–27	25–17	25–23	–	107–97	P2
16 November	18:00	Cignal HD Spikers	3–1	Meralco Power Spikers	25–22	25–19	21–25	25–21	–	96–87	P2

== Final round ==
Semifinals (single-elimination)
1	Philips Gold	2
4	Foton	3
2	Petron	3
3	Cignal	1

Championship (best-of-three)
4	Foton	3	1	3
2	Petron	1	3	0

=== Semifinals ===
Date	Time		Score		Set 1	Set 2	Set 3	Set 4	Set 5	Total	Report
19 November	16:00	Philips Gold Lady Slammers	2–3	Foton Tornadoes	18–25	24–26	25–18	25–20	8–15	100–104	P2
19 November	18:00	Petron Blaze Spikers	3–1	Cignal HD Spikers	25–20	26–24	20–25	25–13	–	96–82	P2

=== Finals ===
==== Fifth place match ====
Date	Time		Score		Set 1	Set 2	Set 3	Set 4	Set 5	Total	Report
21 November	15:00	Meralco Power Spikers	3–1	RC Cola–Air Force Raiders	25–21	20–25	25–23	25–20	–	95–89	P2

==== Third place match ====
Date	Time		Score		Set 1	Set 2	Set 3	Set 4	Set 5	Total	Report
21 November	13:00	Philips Gold Lady Slammers	3–1	Cignal HD Spikers	23–25	25–21	25–22	25–17	–	98–85	P2

==== Championship ====
November 26, 2015; 16:00	Foton Tornadoes	3–1	Petron Blaze Spikers	Cuneta Astrodome; Attendance: 1, 502; Referees: J. Hugo, L. Pajarillo
November 26, 2015; 16:00	(14–25, 25–21, 25–19, 25–22); Match Result P2; POG: #6 Lindsay Stalzer, with 23 attacks, 1 block and 1 service ace			Cuneta Astrodome; Attendance: 1, 502; Referees: J. Hugo, L. Pajarillo

November 30, 2015; 16:00	Petron Blaze Spikers	3–1	Foton Tornadoes	Cuneta Astrodome; Attendance: 5,020; Referees: J. Hugo, J. Villareal
November 30, 2015; 16:00	(25–13, 25–21, 23–25, 26–24); Match Result P2; POG: #2 Abigail Maraño, with 12 attacks, 3 blocks and 1 service ace			Cuneta Astrodome; Attendance: 5,020; Referees: J. Hugo, J. Villareal

December 5, 2015; 13:00	Foton Tornadoes	3–0	Petron Blaze Spikers	Cuneta Astrodome; Attendance: 9,000; Referees: L. Benito, Jr., J. Hugo
December 5, 2015; 13:00	(25–18, 25–18, 25–17); Match Result P2; POG: #2 Katie Messing, with 12 attacks and 2 service aces			Cuneta Astrodome; Attendance: 9,000; Referees: L. Benito, Jr., J. Hugo

== Final standing ==
Rank	Team
1st place, gold medalist(s)	Foton Tornadoes
2nd place, silver medalist(s)	Petron Blaze Spikers
3rd place, bronze medalist(s)	Philips Gold Lady Slammers
4	Cignal HD Spikers
5	Meralco Power Spikers
6	RC Cola–Air Force Raiders

Qualified for the 2016 Asian Club Volleyball Championship

2015 Philippine Super Liga Grand Prix champions
Foton Tornadoes
1st title

Team roster
1.) Angeli Araneta
2.) Katie Messing
3.) Jaja Santiago
4.) Patty Orendain
5.) Kara Acevedo
6.) Lindsay Stalzer
7.) Ivy Remulla (c)
8.) May Macatuno
9.) Ivy Perez
10.) Kayla Williams
11.) Bia General
16.) Royce Estampa
17.) Fiola Ceballos
18.) Jeannie delos Reyes

Head coach:
Ma. Vilet Ponce de Leon

=== Individual awards ===
Award		Name/Team
MVP		(United States) Lindsay Stalzer (Foton)
Best Outside Spiker	1st:	(United States) Ariel Elizabeth Usher (Cignal)
Best Outside Spiker	2nd:	(United States) Bojana Todorovic (Philips Gold)
Best Middle Blocker	1st:	(United States) Alexis Olgard (Philips Gold)
Best Middle Blocker	2nd:	(Philippines) Jaja Santiago (Foton)
Best Opposite Spiker	1st:	(Philippines) Michele Gumabao (Philips Gold)
Best Opposite Spiker	2nd:	(Philippines) Frances Xinia Molina (Petron)
Best Setter	1st:	(Philippines) Ivy Jizel Perez (Foton)
Best Setter	2nd:	(Brazil) Erica Adachi (Petron)
Best Libero		(Philippines) Jennylyn Reyes (Petron)
Coach of the Year		(Philippines) George Pascua (Petron)

=== Skill set leaders ===
Skill	Name/Team
Spiking	Aleona Manabat
Setting	Ivy Perez
Serving	Aleona Manabat
Blocking	Abigail Marano
Receiving	Jennylyn Reyes
Digging	Jennylyn Reyes

== Venues ==
=== Metro Manila venues ===
- Cuneta Astrodome (main venue)
- Filoil Flying V Arena (secondary venue)

=== PSL Spike on Tour venues ===
- Alonte Sports Arena (October 10 - opening day)
- Malolos Sports and Convention Center (November 7)
- De La Salle Lipa Sentrum (November 14)
- Imus City Sports Center (November 21)

== Broadcast partners ==
- TV5, AksyonTV, Sports5.ph
- Solar Sports

Broadcast Notes:

Game	Sports5 coverage			Solar Sports coverage	
Game	Play-by-play	Analyst	Courtside reporters	Play-by-play	Analyst
Battle for Third	James Velasquez	Tex Suter	Apple David	Noel Zarate	Shiela Salaysay
Battle for Fifth	Denise Tan	Chiqui Pablo	Apple David	Noel Zarate	Shiela Salaysay
Finals Game 1	James Velasquez	Tex Suter	Mich del Carmen and Carmela Tunay	unannounced	unannounced
Finals Game 2	James Velasquez	Denise Tan	Apple David and Carla Lizardo	Ronnie Magsanoc	Xavier Nunag
Finals Game 3	James Velasquez	Chiqui Pablo	Mich del Carmen and Carmela Tunay	Noel Zarate	Anne Remulla-Canda

Additional Game 3 crew:

Awards Presenter: Anthony Suntay
