= 2015 Philippine Super Liga Beach Volleyball Challenge Cup =

Inaugural edition of the Philippine Super Liga beach volleyball tournament

- Duration: July 18 – August 8, 2015
- Teams: W: 13 (Note: Eleven teams; Thirteen separate squads); M: 9 (Note: Seven teams; nine separate squads)
- TV partner(s): AksyonTV, Sports5.ph

Results
- Champions: W: Giligan's Sisig Queens; M: SM By The Bay (A)
- Runners-up: W: Foton Tornadoes; M: Champion Infinity Active Smashers (B)
- Third place: W: Cignal HD Spikers (B); M: Cignal HD Spikers (A)
- Fourth place: W: Foton Hurricanes; M: CenterStage Family KTV

PSL Beach Volleyball Challenge Cup chronology
- 2016 >

PSL conference chronology
- < 2015 All-Filipino 2015 Grand Prix >

The 2015 Philippine Super Liga Beach Volleyball Challenge Cup was the inaugural edition of the Philippine Super Liga Beach Volleyball Challenge Cup and the second tournament of the 2015 season. The conference began on July 18, 2015 and ended on August 8, 2015 at the newly opened The Sands, SM By The Bay (SM Mall of Asia). The games were held for four consecutive Saturdays. The tournament was co-sponsored by Smart Communications.

== Women's division ==
2015 Philippine Super Liga Beach Volleyball Challenge Cup – Women's division
Abbr.	Team	Affiliation	Head coach	Team captain
AQP-A	Accel Quantum Plus (Team A)	Sporteum Philippines / UPHSD-Molino		Evangeline Pastor and Kim Ygay
AQP-B	Accel Quantum Plus (Team B)	Sporteum Philippines / UPHSD-Molino		Aurora Tripoli and Rochet Dela Paz
AMY	Amy's Kitchen	Sonia Trading, Inc.		Marleen Cortel and Samantha Dawson
BEN	Beneco	Benguet Electric Cooperative	Jun Nisperos	Cindy Benitez and Florence Madulid
CIG-A	Cignal HD Spikers (Team A)	Cignal TV, Inc.	Sammy Acaylar	Cha Cruz and Michelle Laborte
CIG-B	Cignal HD Spikers (Team B)	Cignal TV, Inc.	Sammy Acaylar	April Rose Hingpit and Wensh Tiu
FOT-A	Foton Hurricanes	United Asia Automotive Group, Inc.	Yani Fernandez	Pau Soriano and Bea Tan
FOT-B	Foton Tornadoes	United Asia Automotive Group, Inc.	Yani Fernandez	Patty Orendain and Fiola Ceballos
GIL	Giligan's Sisig Queens	Giligan's Restaurant		Danika Gendrauli and Norie Jane Diaz
MER	Meralco	Manila Electric Company	Emil Lontoc	Jem Gutierrez and Jusabille Brillo
PET-A	Petron Sprint 4T	Petron Corporation	George Pascua	Alexa Micek and Fille Cayetano
PET-B	Petron XCS	Petron Corporation	George Pascua	Gretchen Ho and Charo Soriano
PHG	Philips Gold Lady Slammers	Federated Distributors, Inc.	Francis Vicente	Aileen Abuel and Rossan Fajardo

=== Preliminary round ===
==== Pool A ====
Pos	Team	Pld	W	L	Pts	SW	SL	SR	SPW	SPL	SPR	Qualification
1	Amy's Kitchen	2	2	0	6	4	0	MAX	84	50	1.680	Quarterfinals
2	Philips Gold Lady Slammers	2	1	1	3	2	2	1.000	72	70	1.029	Quarterfinals
3	Accel Quantum Plus (A)	2	0	2	0	0	4	0.000	48	84	0.571	Classification match

Date	Time		Score		Set 1	Set 2	Set 3	Total	Report
18 Jul	13:00	Amy's Kitchen	2–0	Accel Quantum Plus (A)	21–7	21–13		42–20	
18 Jul	17:30	Philips Gold Lady Slammers	2–0	Accel Quantum Plus (A)	21–12	21–16		42–28	
25 Jul	16:00	Philips Gold Lady Slammers	0–2	Amy's Kitchen	18–21	12–21		30–42	

==== Pool B ====
Pos	Team	Pld	W	L	Pts	SW	SL	SR	SPW	SPL	SPR	Qualification
1	Cignal HD Spikers (B)	2	2	0	6	4	0	MAX	84	54	1.556	Quarterfinals
2	Petron XCS	2	1	1	3	2	2	1.000	71	58	1.224	Quarterfinals
3	Accel Quantum Plus (B)	2	0	2	0	0	4	0.000	41	84	0.488	Classification match

Date	Time		Score		Set 1	Set 2	Set 3	Total	Report
18 Jul	16:40	Cignal HD Spikers (B)	2–0	Petron XCS	21–16	21–13		42–29	
18 Jul	19:00	Cignal HD Spikers (B)	2–0	Accel Quantum Plus (B)	21–12	21–13		42–25	
25 Jul	14:30	Petron XCS	2–0	Accel Quantum Plus (B)	21–7	21–9		42–16	

==== Pool C ====
Pos	Team	Pld	W	L	Pts	SW	SL	SR	SPW	SPL	SPR	Qualification
1	Foton Tornadoes	2	2	0	6	4	1	4.000	94	77	1.221	Quarterfinals
2	Meralco	2	1	1	3	3	2	1.500	92	75	1.227	Quarterfinals
3	Beneco	2	0	2	0	0	4	0.000	50	84	0.595	Classification match

Date	Time		Score		Set 1	Set 2	Set 3	Total	Report
18 Jul	16:00	Foton Tornadoes	2–0	Beneco	21–9	21–18		42–27	
18 Jul	18:20	Meralco	2–0	Beneco	21–11	21–12		42–23	
25 Jul	16:40	Foton Tornadoes	2–1	Meralco	21–15	15–21	16–14	52–50	

==== Pool D ====
Pos	Team	Pld	W	L	Pts	SW	SL	SR	SPW	SPL	SPR	Qualification
1	Foton Hurricanes	3	2	1	6	4	4	1.000	134	126	1.063	Quarterfinals
2	Giligan's Sisig Queens	3	2	1	6	5	3	1.667	0	135	0.000	Quarterfinals
3	Petron Sprint 4T	3	1	2	3	3	4	0.750	119	131	0.908	Classification match
4	Cignal HD Spikers (A)	3	1	2	3	2	4	0.500	114	122	0.934	

Date	Time		Score		Set 1	Set 2	Set 3	Total	Report
18 Jul	14:30	Giligan's Sisig Queens	2–0	Cignal HD Spikers (A)	21–19	21–14		42–33	
18 Jul	15:20	Foton Hurricanes	2–0	Petron Sprint 4T	21–15	21–14		42–29	
25 Jul	13:00	Giligan's Sisig Queens	2–1	Foton Hurricanes	21–19	18–21	12–15	51–55	
25 Jul	15:20	Petron Sprint 4T	2–0	Cignal HD Spikers (A)	22–20	21–15		43–35	
25 Jul	17:30	Foton Hurricanes	0–2	Cignal HD Spikers (A)	23–25	14–21		37–46	
25 Jul	18:20	Petron Sprint 4T	1–2	Giligan's Sisig Queens	21–18	17–21	9–15	47–54	

=== Playoffs ===
==== 11th place match ====
Date	Time		Score		Set 1	Set 2	Set 3	Total	Report
01 Aug	11:40	Beneco	2–0	Accel Quantum Plus (B)	21–14	21–5	0–0	42–19	

==== Ninth place match ====
Date	Time		Score		Set 1	Set 2	Set 3	Total	Report
01 Aug	11:40	Petron Sprint 4T	2–0	Accel Quantum Plus (A)	21–8	21–9	0–0	42–17	

==== Quarterfinals ====
Date	Time		Score		Set 1	Set 2	Set 3	Total	Report
01 Aug	14:30	Cignal HD Spikers (B)	2–0	Meralco	21–14	21–18		42–32	
01 Aug	15:20	Foton Hurricanes	2–1	Petron XCS	21–12	18–21	15–7	54–40	
01 Aug	16:00	Foton Tornadoes	2–0	Philips Gold Lady Slammers	21–19	21-12		42–31	
01 Aug	16:40	Amy's Kitchen	0–2	Giligan's Sisig Queens	14–21	11–21		25–42	

==== 5th–8th classification ====
Date	Time		Score		Set 1	Set 2	Set 3	Total	Report
01 Aug	17:30	Meralco	0–2	Amy's Kitchen	17-21	19-21	0–0	36–42	
01 Aug	18:10	Philips Gold Lady Slammers	0–2	Petron XCS	18-21	13-21	0–0	31–42	

==== Seventh place match ====
Date	Time		Score		Set 1	Set 2	Set 3	Total	Report
08 Aug	10:00	Amy's Kitchen	2–0	Philips Gold Lady Slammers	21–18	21–9		0–0	

==== Fifth place match ====
Date	Time		Score		Set 1	Set 2	Set 3	Total	Report
08 Aug	11:00	Meralco	0–0	Petron XCS	0–0	0–0	0–0	0–0	

NOTE: Meralco won via default.

==== Semifinals ====
Semifinals
01 Aug
Cignal (Team B)	1
Giligan's	2
01 Aug
Foton Hurricanes	0
Foton Tornadoes	2

Final
08 Aug
Giligan's	2
Foton Tornadoes	1
3rd place match
08 Aug
Cignal (Team B)	2
Foton Hurricanes	0

Date	Time		Score		Set 1	Set 2	Set 3	Total	Report
01 Aug	18:50	Cignal HD Spikers (B)	1–2	Giligan's Sisig Queens	23-25	21-18	3-15	47–58	
01 Aug	19:30	Foton Hurricanes	0–2	Foton Tornadoes	18-21	16-21		34–42	

==== Third place match ====
Date	Time		Score		Set 1	Set 2	Set 3	Total	Report
08 Aug	14:30	Cignal HD Spikers (B)	2–0	Foton Hurricanes	21–18	21–18		42–36	

==== Women's Finals ====
Danika Gendrauli and Jane Diaz prevailed in the final game of the PSL's Beach VB Challenge Cup. Gendrauli of SWU (with her partner then, Raphil Aguilar) was used to play against Foton's Fiona Ceballos of CPU together with Army's regular Jovelyn Gonzaga in the finals of Nestea Intercollegiate Beach VB held in Boracay two years ago.

Date	Time		Score		Set 1	Set 2	Set 3	Total	Report
08 Aug	15:30	Giligan's Sisig Queens	2–1	Foton Tornadoes	19–21	21–14	15–11	55–46	

=== Final standing ===
Gendrauli and Diaz will represent the country in the 2015 Spike For Peace Women’s International Beach Volleyball.

Rank	Team
1st place, gold medalist(s)	Giligan's Sisig Queens
2nd place, silver medalist(s)	Foton Tornadoes
3rd place, bronze medalist(s)	Cignal HD Spikers (Team B)
4	Foton Hurricanes
5	Meralco Power Spikers
6	Petron XCS
7	Amy's Kitchen
8	Philips Gold Lady Slammers
9	Petron Sprint 4T
10	Accel Quantum Plus (Team B)
11	Beneco
12	Accel Quantum Plus (Team A)
13	Cignal HD Spikers (Team A)

2015 Philippine Super Liga Beach Challenge Cup
Giligan's Sisig Queens
1st title
Team Roster
Danika Gendrauli and Norie Jane Diaz

== Men's Division ==
2015 PSL Beach Volleyball Challenge Cup teams (Men's Division)
Abbr.	Team	Company	Colors	Head coach	Players
CEN	CenterStage Family KTV	CenterStage Family KTV			John Carlo Lozada and Rence Melgar
CHAMP-A	Champion Infinity Active Smashers (Team A)	Peerless Products Corporation			Angelo Espiritu and Nestor Molate
CHAMP-B	Champion Infinity Active Smashers (Team B)	Peerless Products Corporation			Marjun Alingasa and Tippy Tipgos
CIG-A	Cignal HD Spikers (Team A)	Cignal TV, Inc.		Sammy Acaylar	Sandy Montero and Edmar Bonono
CIG-B	Cignal HD Spikers (Team B)	Cignal TV, Inc.		Sammy Acaylar	Jay dela Cruz and Emmanuel Luces
IEM	IEM Volley Masters	Instituto Estetico Manila			Michael Ian Conde and Karl dela Calzada
SM-A	SM By The Bay (Team A)	SM Prime Holdings		Eric Lecain	Jade Becaldo and Hachaliah Gilbuena
SM-B	SM By The Bay (Team B)	SM Prime Holdings		Eric Lecain	Tim Young and Daniel Young
UPHSD-A	UPHSD Altas - Molino (Team A)	University of Perpetual Help System DALTA - Molino			Fernando Alboro and Ronel del Mundo
UPHSD-B	UPHSD Altas - Molino (Team B)	University of Perpetual Help System DALTA - Molino			Emanuel Gamat and Paolo Aloña

=== Preliminary round ===
==== Pool A ====
Pos	Team	Pld	W	L	Pts	SW	SL	SR	SPW	SPL	SPR
1	Cignal (A) (CIG-A)	4	4	0	12	8	1	8.000	178	135	1.319
2	CenterStage (CEN)	4	3	1	9	4	6	0.667	169	183	0.923
3	Champion Infinity (A) (CHAMP-A)	4	2	2	6	6	4	1.500	182	156	1.167
4	UPHSD (A) (UPHSD-A)	4	1	3	3	2	6	0.333	113	162	0.698
5	SM By The Bay (B) (SM-B)	4	0	4	0	1	8	0.125	133	181	0.735

Date	Time		Score		Set 1	Set 2	Set 3	Total	Report
18 Jul	07:30	CHAMP-A	2–0	UPHSD-A	21–18	21–9		42–27	
18 Jul	08:20	CIG-A	2–0	SM-B	21–15	21–14		42–29	
18 Jul	10:20	CIG-A	2–0	CEN	21–17	21–19		42–36	
18 Jul	11:00	CHAMP-A	2–0	SM-B	21–12	21–8		42–20	
25 Jul	07:30	UPHSD-A	2–0	SM-B	21–18	21–18		42–36	
25 Jul	08:20	CEN	2–1	CHAMP-A	21–19	21–23	15–9	57–51	
25 Jul	10:20	CIG-A	2–1	CHAMP-A	16–21	21–19	15–7	52–47	
25 Jul	11:00	UPHSD-A	0–2	CEN	12–21	9–21		21–42	
25 Jul	19:00	SM-B	1–2	CEN	16–21	21–19	11–15	48–55	
25 Jul	20:20	CIG-A	2–0	UPHSD-A	21–14	21–9		42–23	

==== Pool B ====
Pos	Team	Pld	W	L	Pts	SW	SL	SR	SPW	SPL	SPR
1	SM By The Bay (A) (SM-A)	4	4	0	12	8	1	8.000	180	116	1.552
2	Champion Infinity (B) (CHAMP-B)	4	3	1	9	8	2	4.000	187	123	1.520
3	Cignal (B) (CIG-B)	4	2	2	6	5	4	1.250	160	146	1.096
4	IEM Volley Masters (IEM)	4	1	3	3	2	6	0.333	135	150	0.900
5	UPHSD (B) (UPHSD-B)	4	0	4	0	0	8	0.000	71	168	0.423

Date	Time		Score		Set 1	Set 2	Set 3	Total	Report
18 Jul	09:00	CIG-B	2–0	UPHSD-B	21–12	21–4		42–16	
18 Jul	09:40	CHAMP-B	2–0	IEM	21–15	21–15		42–30	
18 Jul	19:40	SM-A	2–0	IEM	21–17	21–13		42–30	
18 Jul	20:20	CHAMP-B	2–1	CIG-B	21–15	19–21	15–13	55–49	
25 Jul	08:20	CHAMP-B	2–0	UPHSD-B	21–13	21–7		42–20	
25 Jul	10:20	SM-A	2–0	CIG-B	21–11	21–16		42–27	
25 Jul	11:40	CIG-B	2–0	IEM	21–19	21–14		42–33	
25 Jul	12:20	UPHSD-B	0–2	SM-A	7–21	4–21		11–42	
25 Jul	19:40	SM-A	2–1	CHAMP-B	21–17	18–21	15–10	54–48	
25 Jul	21:00	IEM	2–0	UPHSD-B	21–13	21–11		42–24	

=== Playoffs ===
==== Ninth place match ====
Date	Time		Score		Set 1	Set 2	Set 3	Total	Report
01 Aug	09:10	SM-B	0–0	UPHSD-B	0–0	0–0	0–0	0–0	

NOTE: UPHSD-B won via default.

==== Seventh place match ====
Date	Time		Score		Set 1	Set 2	Set 3	Total	Report
01 Aug	08:20	UPHSD-A	2–0	IEM	21–16	21–8	0–0	42–24	

==== Fifth place match ====
Date	Time		Score		Set 1	Set 2	Set 3	Total	Report
01 Aug	07:30	CHAMP-A	1–2	CIG-B	17-21	21-15	14–16	52–52	

==== Semifinals ====
Semifinals
01 Aug
Champion Infinity (Team B)	3
Cignal (Team A)	1
01 Aug
CenterStage	0
SM By The Bay (Team A)	2

Final
08 Aug
Champion Infinity (Team B)	0
SM By The Bay (Team A)	0
3rd place match
08 Aug
Cignal (Team A)	0
CenterStage	0

Date	Time		Score		Set 1	Set 2	Set 3	Total	Report
01 Aug	10:00	CHAMP-B	2–1	CIG-A	21–23	22–10	15–10	58–43	
01 Aug	10:50	CEN	2–0	SM-A	13-21	16–21		29–42	

==== Third place match ====
Date	Time		Score		Set 1	Set 2	Set 3	Total	Report
08 Aug	13:00	CEN	0–0	CIG-A	0–0	0–0	0–0	0–0	

NOTE: Cignal (Team A) won via default.

==== Men's Finals ====
Date	Time		Score		Set 1	Set 2	Set 3	Total	Report
08 Aug	17:00	SM-A	2–0	CHAMP-B	21–17	23–21		0–0	

=== Final standing ===
Rank	Team
1st place, gold medalist(s)	SM By The Bay (Team A)
2nd place, silver medalist(s)	Champion Infinity (Team B)
3rd place, bronze medalist(s)	Cignal HD Spikers (Team A)
4	CenterStage Family KTV
5	Cignal HD Spikers (Team B)
6	Champion Infinity (Team A)
7	UPHSD Altas - Molino (Team A)
8	IEM Volley Masters
9	UPHSD Altas - Molino (Team B)
10	SM By The Bay (Team B)

2015 Philippine Super Liga Beach Challenge Cup
SM By The Bay (Team A)
1st title
Team Roster
Jade Becaldo and Hachaliah Gilbuena
Head Coach:
Eric Lecain

== Venue ==
- The Sands (SM By The Bay, SM Mall of Asia)

== Broadcast partners ==
- TV5, AksyonTV, Sports5.ph
