= 2015 Philippine Super Liga season =

- Duration: March 21 – December 5, 2015
- Teams: Women's: 6
- TV partner(s): TV5, AksyonTV, Sports5.ph, Solar Sports
- Top draft pick: Iris Tolenada (San Francisco State)
- Picked by: Philips Gold Lady Slammers
- All-Filipino champions: Petron Blaze Spikers
- All-Filipino runners-up: Shopinas.com Lady Clickers
- Beach Challenge Cup champions: Women's: Giligan's Sisig Queens; Men's: SM By The Bay (Team A)
- Beach Challenge Cup runners-up: Women's: Foton Tornadoes; Men's: Champion Infinity (Team B)
- Grand Prix champions: Foton Tornadoes
- Grand Prix runners-up: Petron Blaze Spikers

Seasons
- ← 2014 2016 →

The 2015 Philippine Super Liga season was the third season of the Philippine Super Liga (PSL). There were two conferences for the season, the All-Filipino Conference and the Grand Prix. Additionally, the Beach Volleyball Challenge Cup was established this season with its inaugural edition.

Starting with this season, the league would no longer hold a men's division for its indoor volleyball conferences as many teams left for Spikers' Turf. The men's division would only be held for the Beach Volleyball Challenge Cup.

== Developments ==
- The PSL is now sanctioned under the Larong Volleyball sa Pilipinas, Inc. (LVPI), the newest governing body for volleyball in the Philippines under the leadership of POC 1st Vice President Joey Romasanta, aside for being recognized by the AVC and the FIVB. The PSL was first sanctioned by the Philippine Volleyball Federation (PVF) until the federation was stripped of its recognition by the local (POC) and foreign (FIVB, AVC) sport governing bodies. The LVPI also supported the stints of Cignal and Petron who participated in the Asian Club Championships, and helped on the processing of the imports transfer clearances for the 12 imports that played in the Grand Prix.
- The PSL introduced the use of "skorts", a combination of tennis-like skirts and shorts, as part of the women's uniforms during the All Filipino Conference, but it was discontinued during the PSL Grand Prix.
- Continuous coaching and players, television crew, officiating (referees), volleyball information system, press corps and medical seminars.
- After the introduction of the Men's Division in the PSL in 2013, the PSL launched the Beach Volleyball division thru the Challenge Cup and Open Series.
- The PSL's official newspaper, PSL Trending, managed by the PSL Press Corps under its president, Marc Anthony Reyes of the Philippine Daily Inquirer. PSL Trending is given to the fans for free at the venues during gamedays.
- The PSL has partnered with the TV5 Network (TV5, AksyonTV and Sports5.ph) for three years starting 2015, for broadcast and online coverage.
- The PSL became the third Southeast Asian-based volleyball club league (next to Thailand and Vietnam) to utilize the video challenge system to decide crucial calls of the games for a fair and balanced officiating, as part of the full compliance to the FIVB rules. The video challenge equipment arrived on October 26, 2015 and was used during the second round of the 2015 Grand Prix.

== Draft ==
The draft was held on March 12, 2015 at SM Aura Premier, Taguig.

=== First round ===
Pick	Player	Position	Nationality	Team	College
1	Iris Tolenada	Setter	United States	Philips Gold Lady Slammers	San Francisco State
2	Angeli Araneta	Middle Blocker	Philippines	Foton Tornadoes	UP
3	Rica Enclona	Libero	Philippines	Cignal HD Spikers	CSB
4	Rizza Jane Mandapat	Opposite Spiker	Philippines	Shopinas.com Lady Clickers	NU
5	Maureen Veronas	Opposite Spiker/ Outside Hitter	Philippines	Mane 'n Tail Lady Stallions	CSB
6	Alexa Micek	Opposite Spiker	United States	Petron Blaze Spikers	NC State

=== Second round ===
Pick	Player	Position	Nationality	Team	College
1	Siemens Desiree Dadang	Middle	Philippines	Philips Gold Lady Slammers	NU
2	Dennise Michelle Lazaro	Libero	Philippines	Foton Tornadoes	ADMU
3	Diane Ticar	Setter	Philippines	Cignal HD Spikers	Arellano
4	Djanel Welch Cheng	Setter	Philippines	Shopinas.com Lady Clickers	CSB
5	Samantha Dawson	Opposite Spiker	Philippines	Mane 'n Tail Lady Stallions	FEU
6	Ivy Jizel Perez	Setter	Philippines	Petron Blaze Spikers	NU

== All-Filipino Conference ==
The Petron Blaze Spikers became the first team to sweep a PSL tournament with a 13–0 record and claim the All-Filipino championship, its second consecutive PSL title.

2015 PSL All-Filipino Conference teams (Women's Division)
Abbr.	Team	Company	Colors	Head coach	Team Captain
CIG	Cignal HD Spikers	Cignal TV, Inc.		Sammy Acaylar	Charrisse Ancheta (SSC-R)
FOT	Foton Tornadoes	United Asia Automotive Group, Inc.		Ma. Vilet Ponce de Leon	Ivy Remulla (DLSU)
MNT	Mane 'n Tail Lady Stallions	Federated Distributors, Inc.		Rosemarie Prochina	Jill Gustilo (Adamson)
PHG	Philips Gold Lady Slammers	Federated Distributors, Inc.		Francis Vicente	Michele Gumabao (DLSU)
PET	Petron Blaze Spikers	Petron Corporation		George Pascua	Maica Morada (FEU)
SHOP	Shopinas.com Lady Clickers	Air21 Global, Inc.		Ramil de Jesus	Michelle Laborte (USLS)

=== Classification round ===
Pos	Team	Pld	W	L	Pts	SW	SL	SR	SPW	SPL	SPR	Qualification
1	Petron Blaze Spikers	10	10	0	28	30	7	4.286	881	709	1.243	Semifinals
2	Shopinas.com Lady Clickers	10	6	4	19	22	16	1.375	812	819	0.991	Semifinals
3	Foton Tornadoes	10	5	5	16	20	18	1.111	843	795	1.060	Quarterfinals
4	Philips Gold Lady Slammers	10	5	5	14	18	21	0.857	811	849	0.955	Quarterfinals
5	Cignal HD Spikers	10	2	8	7	10	24	0.417	718	797	0.901	Quarterfinals
6	Mane 'n Tail Lady Stallions	10	2	8	7	10	24	0.417	713	809	0.881	Quarterfinals

=== Playoffs ===
Quarterfinals (single-elimination)
4	Philips Gold	3
5	Cignal	2
3	Foton	3
6	Mane 'n Tail	0

Semifinals (single-elimination)
1	Petron	3
4	Philips Gold	0
2	Shopinas.com	3
6	Foton	2

Championship (best-of-three)
1	Petron	3	3	–
2	Shopinas.com	0	1	–

=== Final standings ===
Rank	Team
1st place, gold medalist(s)	Petron Blaze Spikers
2nd place, silver medalist(s)	Shopinas.com Lady Clickers
3rd place, bronze medalist(s)	Philips Gold Lady Slammers
4	Foton Tornadoes
5	Cignal HD Spikers
6	Mane 'n Tail Lady Stallions

2015 Philippine Super Liga All-Filipino Conference
Petron Blaze Spikers
2nd title
Team roster

Mary Grace Masangkay, Abigail Maraño, Rachel Daquis, Carmina Aganon, Luisa Mae Zapanta, Jozza Cabalsa, Frances Xinia Molina, Alexa Micek, Ivy Perez, Ana Ma. Del Mundo, Jennylyn Reyes, Mecaila Irish May Morada (c), Fille Cayetano, Aleona Denise Manabat
Head coach
George Pascua

=== Awards ===
Award		Women's
MVP		Rachel Daquis
Best Outside Spiker	1st:	Charleen Abigail Cruz
Best Outside Spiker	2nd:	Patty Jane Orendain
Best Middle Blocker	1st:	Aleona Denise Manabat
Best Middle Blocker	2nd:	Abigail Maraño
Best Opposite Spiker		Michele Gumabao
Best Setter		Iris Tolenada
Best Libero		Jennylyn Reyes

== Grand Prix ==
The Grand Prix started on October 10, 2015 at the Alonte Sports Arena in Binan, Laguna.

2015 PSL Grand Prix teams (Women's Division)
Abbr.	Team	Company	Colors	Head coach	Team Captain	Imports
CIG	Cignal HD Spikers	Cignal TV, Inc.		Sammy Acaylar	Michelle Laborte (USLS)	Amanda Anderson (United States); Ariel Usher (United States)
FOT	Foton Tornadoes	United Asia Automotive Group, Inc.		Ma. Vilet Ponce de Leon	Ivy Remulla (DLSU)	Katie Messing (United States); Lindsay Stalzer (United States)
MER	MERALCO Power Spikers	Manila Electric Company		Ramil de Jesus	Charleen Abigail Cruz (DLSU)	Christina Alessi (United States); Liis Kullerkann (Estonia)
PET	Petron Blaze Spikers	Petron Corporation		George Pascua	Maica Morada (FEU)	Erica Adachi (Brazil); Rupia Inck Furtado (Brazil)
PHG	Philips Gold Lady Slammers	Federated Distributors, Inc.		Francis Vicente	Michele Gumabao (DLSU)	Alexis Olgard (United States); Bojana Todorovic (United States)
RCC	RC Cola Air Force Raiders	ARC Refreshments Corporation		Rhovyl Verayo	Judy Ann Caballejo (UST)	Sarah McClinton (United States); Lynda Morales (Puerto Rico)

=== Classification round ===
Pos	Team	Pld	W	L	Pts	SW	SL	SR	SPW	SPL	SPR	Qualification
1	Philips Gold Lady Slammers	10	8	2	22	27	14	1.929	930	865	1.075	Semifinals
2	Petron Blaze Spikers	10	7	3	21	26	15	1.733	923	831	1.111	Semifinals
3	Cignal HD Spikers	10	7	3	20	23	17	1.353	866	829	1.045	Semifinals
4	Foton Tornadoes	10	6	4	19	23	15	1.533	838	767	1.093	Semifinals
5	Meralco Power Spikers	10	1	9	5	9	27	0.333	735	839	0.876	Fifth place match
6	RC Cola–Air Force Raiders	10	1	9	3	9	29	0.310	747	908	0.823	Fifth place match

=== Playoffs ===
Semifinals (single-elimination)
1	Philips Gold	2
4	Foton	3
2	Petron	3
3	Cignal	1

Championship (best-of-three)
4	Foton	3	1	3
2	Petron	1	3	0

=== Final standings ===
Rank	Team
1st place, gold medalist(s)	Foton Tornadoes
2nd place, silver medalist(s)	Petron Blaze Spikers
3rd place, bronze medalist(s)	Philips Gold Lady Slammers
4	Cignal HD Spikers
5	MERALCO Power Spikers
6	RC Cola Air Force Raiders

Qualified for the 2016 Asian Club Volleyball Championship

2015 Philippine Super Liga Grand Prix
Champions

1st title

Team roster
1.) Angeli Araneta
2.) Katie Messing
3.) Jaja Santiago
4.) Patty Orendain
5.) Kara Acevedo
6.) Lindsay Stalzer
7.) Ivy Remulla (c)
8.) May Macatuno
9.) Ivy Perez
10.) Kayla Williams
11.) Bia General
16.) Royce Estampa
17.) Fiola Ceballos
18.) Jeannie delos Reyes

Head coach:
Ma. Vilet Ponce de Leon

=== Awards ===
Award		Name/Team
MVP		(United States) Lindsay Stalzer (Foton)
Best Outside Spiker	1st:	(United States) Ariel Elizabeth Usher (Cignal)
Best Outside Spiker	2nd:	(United States) Bojana Todorovic (Philips Gold)
Best Middle Blocker	1st:	(United States) Alexis Olgard (Philips Gold)
Best Middle Blocker	2nd:	(Philippines) Alyja Daphne Santiago (Foton)
Best Opposite Spiker	1st:	(Philippines) Michele Gumabao (Philips Gold)
Best Opposite Spiker	2nd:	(Philippines) Frances Xinia Molina (Petron)
Best Setter	1st:	(Philippines) Ivy Jizel Perez (Foton)
Best Setter	2nd:	(Brazil) Erica Adachi (Petron)
Best Libero		(Philippines) Jennylyn Reyes (Petron)
Coach of the Year		(Philippines) George Pascua (Petron)

== Beach Volleyball Challenge Cup ==
=== Women's division ===
2015 PSL Beach Volleyball Challenge Cup teams (Women's Division)
Abbr.	Team	Company	Colors	Head coach	Players
AQP-A	Accel Quantum (Team A)	Sporteum Philippines / UPHSD-Molino			Evangeline Pastor and Kim Ygay
AQP-B	Accel Quantum (Team B)	Sporteum Philippines / UPHSD-Molino			Tripoli Aurora and Rochet Dela Paz
AMY	Amy's Kitchen	Sonia Trading, Inc.			Marleen Cortel and Samantha Dawson
BEN	BENECO	Benguet Electric Cooperative		Jun Nisperos	Cindy Benitez and Florence Madulid
CIG-A	Cignal HD Spikers (Team A)	Cignal TV, Inc.		Sammy Acaylar	Charleen Cruz and Michelle Laborte
CIG-B	Cignal HD Spikers (Team B)	Cignal TV, Inc.		Sammy Acaylar	April Rose Hingpit and Jeushl Wensh Tiu
FOT-A	Foton Hurricanes	United Asia Automotive Group, Inc.		Yani Fernandez	Pau Soriano and Bea Tan
FOT-B	Foton Tornadoes	United Asia Automotive Group, Inc.		Yani Fernandez	Patty Orendain and Fiola Ceballos
GIL	Giligan's Sisig Queens	Giligan's Restaurant			Danika Gendrauli and Norie Jane Diaz
MER	MERALCO	Manila Electric Company		Emil Lontoc	Jem Gutierrez and Jusabille Brillo
PET-A	Petron Sprint 4T	Petron Corporation		George Pascua	Alexa Micek and Fille Cayetano
PET-B	Petron XCS	Petron Corporation		George Pascua	Gretchen Ho and Ma. Rosario Soriano
PHG	Philips Gold Lady Slammers	Federated Distributors, Inc.			Aileen Abuel and Rossan Fajardo

=== Final standings ===
Rank	Team
1st place, gold medalist(s)	Giligan's Sisig Queens
2nd place, silver medalist(s)	Foton Tornadoes
3rd place, bronze medalist(s)	Cignal HD Spikers (Team B)
4	Foton Hurricanes
5	MERALCO Power Spikers
6	Petron XCS
7	Amy's Kitchen
8	Philips Gold Lady Slammers
9	Petron Sprint 4T
10	Accel Quantum (Team B)
11	BENECO
12	Accel Quantum (Team A)
13	Cignal HD Spikers (Team A)

2015 Philippine Super Liga Beach Challenge Cup
Giligan's Sisig Queens
1st title
Team roster
Danika Gendrauli and Norie Jane Diaz

=== Men's division ===
2015 PSL Beach Volleyball Challenge Cup teams (Men's Division)
Abbr.	Team	Company	Colors	Head coach	Players
CEN	CenterStage Family KTV	CenterStage Family KTV			John Carlo Lozada and Rence Melgar
CHAMP-A	Champion Infinity Active Smashers (Team A)	Peerless Products Corporation			Angelo Espiritu and Nestor Molate
CHAMP-B	Champion Infinity Active Smashers (Team B)	Peerless Products Corporation			Marjun Alingasa and Tippy Tipgos
CIG-A	Cignal HD Spikers (Team A)	Cignal TV, Inc.		Sammy Acaylar	Sandy Montero and Edmar Bonono
CIG-B	Cignal HD Spikers (Team B)	Cignal TV, Inc.		Sammy Acaylar	Jay dela Cruz and Emmanuel Luces
IEM	IEM Volley Masters	Instituto Estetico Manila			Michael Ian Conde and Karl dela Calzada
SM-A	SM By The Bay (Team A)	SM Prime Holdings		Eric Lecain	Jade Becaldo and Hachaliah Gilbuena
SM-B	SM By The Bay (Team B)	SM Prime Holdings		Eric Lecain	Tim Young and Daniel Young
UPHSD-A	UPHSD Altas - Molino (Team A)	University of Perpetual Help System DALTA - Molino			Fernando Alboro and Ronel del Mundo
UPHSD-B	UPHSD Altas - Molino (Team B)	University of Perpetual Help System DALTA - Molino			Emanuel Gamat and Paolo Aloña

=== Final standings ===
Rank	Team
1st place, gold medalist(s)	SM By The Bay (Team A)
2nd place, silver medalist(s)	Champion Infinity (Team B)
3rd place, bronze medalist(s)	Cignal HD Spikers (Team A)
4	CenterStage Family KTV
5	Cignal HD Spikers (Team B)
6	Champion Infinity (Team A)
7	UPHSD Altas - Molino (Team A)
8	IEM Volley Masters
9	UPHSD Altas - Molino (Team B)
10	SM By The Bay (Team B)

2015 Philippine Super Liga Beach Challenge Cup
SM By The Bay (Team A)
1st title
Team roster
Jade Becaldo and Hachaliah Gilbuena
Head Coach:
Eric Lecain

== International competitions ==
=== AVC Asian Women's Championship ===
An all-PSL selection represented the Philippines in the 2015 Asian Women's Volleyball Championship. The team placed 12th out of 14 competitors.

Philippines (18th Asian Women's Championship)
No.	Player	Ht.	College	PSL Club	Position
3	Angelique Beatrice Dionela	1.50 m (4 ft 11 in)	UPHSD	Cignal HD Spikers	Defensive specialist
4	Carmina Aganon	1.70 m (5 ft 7 in)	NU	Petron Blaze Spikers	Outside hitter
5	Melissa Gohing	1.59 m (5 ft 2 1/2 in)	DLSU	Philips Gold Lady Slammers	Libero
6	Jeanette Panaga	1.80 m (5 ft 11 in)	CSB	Cignal HD Spikers	Middle blocker
7	Michele Gumabao (c)	1.76 m (5 ft 9 1/2 in)	DLSU	Philips Gold Lady Slammers	Opposite hitter
10	Iris Tolenada	1.74 m (5 ft 8 1/2 in)	San Francisco State	Philips Gold Lady Slammers	Setter
11	Ma. Lourdes Clemente	1.85 m (6 ft 1 in)	UPHSD	Cignal HD Spikers	Middle blocker
13	Kim Kianna Dy	1.78 m (5 ft 10 in)	DLSU	Shopinas.com Lady Clickers	Middle blocker
14	Ma. Abigail Praca	1.70 m (5 ft 7 in)	USJ-R	Mane 'n Tail Lady Stallions	Middle blocker
15	Ivy Jisel Perez	1.75 m (5 ft 9 in)	NU	Petron Blaze Spikers	Setter
17	Myla Pablo	1.76 m (5 ft 9 1/2 in)	NU	Philips Gold Lady Slammers	Outside hitter
18	Frances Molina	1.80 m (5 ft 11 in)	San Beda	Petron Blaze Spikers	Middle hitter/outside hitter

Coaching staff

- Head coach:
  Sinfronio "Sammy" Acaylar (CIG)
- Assistant coach(es):
  Francis Vicente (PHG)
  Rosemarie Prochina (MNT)
  Benson Bocboc (SHP)

Team staff

- Team manager:
- Team Utility:

Medical staff

- Team physician:
- Physical therapist:
  Marie Ong

=== AVC Club Championships ===
The champions of the 2014 Grand Prix - the Petron Blaze Spikers (women's) and the Cignal HD Spikers (men's) - represented the Philippines in the 2015 AVC Club Volleyball Championships.

- The Petron Blaze Spikers placed 8th out of 9 competitors in the women's tournament held in Vietnam on September 12 to 20, 2015.
- The Cignal HD Spikers placed 12th out of 16 competitors in the men's tournament held in Taipei on August 13 to 21, 2015.

=== Spike For Peace International Beach Volleyball ===
The women's division champions of the 2015 Beach Challenge Cup, Danika Gendrauli and Norie Jane Diaz, were the PSL representatives in the 2015 Spike For Peace International Beach Volleyball Tournament held in Manila from November 29 to December 3, 2015.

Gendrauli and Diaz played as Philippines (Team B). Charo Soriano and Alexa Micek represented the Shakey's V-League and played as Philippines (Team A).

Team A finished 12th and Team B finished 13th (last).

== Venues ==
All-Filipino Conference:

- Cuneta Astrodome (main venue)
- Mall of Asia Arena (March 21 - opening day)
- Filoil Flying V Arena (March 29 and March 30)
- Alonte Sports Arena ("Spike on Tour" / March 26, April 9 and April 18)
- Quezon Convention Center ("Spike on Tour" / April 25)
- Imus City Sports Center ("Spike on Tour" / May 11 / Finals Game 1)

Beach Volleyball:

- Sands - SM By The Bay (SM Mall of Asia)

Grand Prix:

- Cuneta Astrodome (main venue)
- Filoil Flying V Arena (secondary venue)
- Alonte Sports Arena (October 10 - opening day)
- Malolos Sports and Convention Center ("Spike on Tour" / November 7)
- De La Salle Lipa ("Spike on Tour" / November 14)
- Imus City Sports Center ("Spike on Tour" / November 21)

== Brand ambassador ==
- Charleen Abigail Cruz

== Broadcast partners ==
- TV5, AksyonTV, Sports5.ph
- Solar Sports
