= Nestea Beach Volleyball =

Beach volleyball tournament in the Philippines

The Nestea Beach Volleyball is a beach volleyball tournament held during the Summer season in the Philippines. Held in the Boracay Beach Chalets, Station 2 in Boracay Island in Aklan, the Nestea Beach Volleyball is the longest-running beach volleyball tournament in the country and the main attraction of the Nestea Love the Beach event in Boracay usually held on April until May or the Labor Day Weekend. It consists into two parts: the Intercollegiate Beach Volleyball tournament featuring collegiate teams from different parts of the country and the Fantasy Match where semi-pro players (consists of two teams by 4 players) duel in a beach volleyball exhibition game.

The tournament is organized by Volleyworks and sanctioned by the Philippine Volleyball Federation (PVF), thru Executive Director Otie Camangian which served as the tournament director.

== Events ==
=== Intercollegiate Beach Volleyball ===
In the 19th edition of the tourney, 10 teams will be competed in the men's divisions including the finals contenders University of Southern Philippines Foundation Panthers and the CSB Blazers, while in the distaff side, 12 teams will be participating in the three-day event, among them are the 2015 champions UST Golden Tigresses and first runner-up DLSU Lady Spikers. Tournament director Camangian stated that if the tourney will have a conflict with the UAAP women's volleyball finals, the teams will send a Team B composed of those who not make it in the line-up of the UAAP team.

==== 2016 teams ====
The teams are composed of the champion teams in their respective collegiate beach volleyball leagues.

Men's Division	Women's Division
USPF Panthers (CESAFI)	UST Golden Tigresses (UAAP)
CSB Blazers (NCAA)	DLSU Lady Spikers (UAAP)
Ateneo Blue Eagles (UAAP)	San Sebastian Lady Stags (NCAA)
Mapua Cardinals (NCAA)	Perpetual Help Binan Lady Saints (NCAA South)
Lyceum Batangas Pirates (NCAA)	USJ-R Lady Jaguars (CESAFI)
USJ-R Jaguars (CESAFI)	SWU Lady Cobras (Unigames)
SWU Cobras (Unigames)	Mindanao State University (Governor's Cup)
Mindanao State University (Governor's Cup)	UB Lady Cardinals (BBEAL)
UB Cardinals (BBEAL)	FEU Lady Tamaraws (UAAP)
Negros Oriental State University (Wildcard)	University of Mindanao-Tagum (Davao Intercollegiate)
	UNO-Recoletos Lady Rams (NOPSSCEA)
	USLS Lady Stingers (Wildcard)

=== Fantasy Match ===
In 2015, Fantasy Match, a side event of the competition was added in the line-up of the activities in the Nestea Beach tourney. For the 2016 edition, top volleyball players in the country will be played in the Fantasy Match on April 29–30, coinciding with the semifinals and finals of the intercollegiate beach volleyball tourney.

Members of last year's fantasy match champions Team Light Blue, Rachel Daquis, Cha Cruz, and Michele Gumabao will return in the sand for the second straight appearance. Gumabao and Cruz will play for Team Chillax, while Daquis will play for Team Plunge.

== See also ==
- Beach Volleyball Republic
