= 2015 Philippine Super Liga All-Filipino Conference =

First indoor conference of the 2015 Philippine Super Liga season

- Duration: March 21 – May 14, 2015
- Teams: 6
- TV partner(s): AksyonTV, Sports5.ph, Solar Sports

Results
- Champions: Petron Blaze Spikers
- Runners-up: Shopinas.com Lady Clickers
- Third place: Philips Gold Lady Slammers
- Fourth place: Foton Tornadoes

Awards
- MVP: Rachel Daquis
- Best OH: Cha Cruz; Patty Jane Orendain
- Best MB: Dindin Santiago-Manabat; Aby Maraño
- Best OPP: Michele Gumabao
- Best Setter: Iris Tolenada
- Best Libero: Jennylyn Reyes

PSL All-Filipino Conference chronology
- < 2014 2016 >

PSL conference chronology
- < 2014 Grand Prix 2015 Grand Prix >
- 2015 BVCC >

The 2015 Philippine Super Liga All-Filipino Conference (also known as the 2015 PLDT Home Ultera Philippine Super Liga All-Filipino Conference due to sponsorship reasons) was the first conference of the 2015 season of the Philippine Super Liga (PSL) and the second running of the All-Filipino Conference. The conference began on March 21, 2015 at the Mall of Asia Arena and ended on May 14, 2015 at the Cuneta Astrodome.

Six teams took part in this conference with two debutants. The Shopinas.com Lady Clickers acquired the franchise held by the Generika Lifesavers. The RC Cola–Air Force Raiders left with Federated Distributors establishing a second team, the second incarnation of the Mane 'n Tail Lady Stallions, as the original team had been renamed to the Philips Gold Lady Slammers. Additionally, this was the first conference following the dissolution of the league's men's division.

The Petron Blaze Spikers won back-to-back championships while also becoming the first team to go undefeated through the entire tournament, including the elimination round and knockout rounds.

== Participating teams ==
2015 Philippine Super Liga All-Filipino Conference
Abbr.	Team	Affiliation	Head coach	Team captain
CIG	Cignal HD Spikers	Cignal TV, Inc.	Sammy Acaylar	Charrisse Ancheta
FOT	Foton Tornadoes	United Asia Automotive Group, Inc.	Ma. Vilet Ponce de Leon	Ivy Remulla
MNT	Mane 'n Tail Lady Stallions	Federated Distributors, Inc.	Rosemarie Prochina	Jill Gustilo
PET	Petron Blaze Spikers	Petron Corporation	George Pascua	Maica Morada
PHG	Philips Gold Lady Slammers	Federated Distributors, Inc.	Francis Vicente	Michele Gumabao
SHOP	Shopinas.com Lady Clickers	Air21 Global, Inc.	Ramil de Jesus	Michelle Laborte

== Format ==
Classification round

- The classification round was a double round-robin tournament, with each team playing two matches against all other teams in their pool for a total of ten matches.
- The top two teams earned a bye to the semifinals while teams ranked third to sixth started in the quarterfinals. The remaining teams were eliminated.

Quarterfinals

- The quarterfinals featured single-elimination matches.
- The match-ups were as follows:
  - QF1: #3 vs. #6
  - QF2: #4 vs. #5
- The winners advanced to the semifinals while the losers would play in the fifth-place match.

Semifinals

- The semifinals also featured single-elimination matches.
- The match-ups were as follows:
  - SF1: #1 vs. QF2 winner
  - SF2: #2 vs. QF1 winner
- The winners advanced to the championship while the losers would play in the third-place match.

Finals

- The championship was a best-of-three series while the third-place and fifth-place matches were both single-elimination.
- The match-ups were as follows:
  - Championship: Semifinal round winners
  - Third-place match: Semifinal round losers
  - Fifth-place match: Quarterfinal round losers

== Classification round ==
Pos	Team	Pld	W	L	Pts	SW	SL	SR	SPW	SPL	SPR	Qualification
1	Petron Blaze Spikers	10	10	0	28	30	7	4.286	881	709	1.243	Semifinals
2	Shopinas.com Lady Clickers	10	6	4	19	22	16	1.375	812	819	0.991	Semifinals
3	Foton Tornadoes	10	5	5	16	20	18	1.111	843	795	1.060	Quarterfinals
4	Philips Gold Lady Slammers	10	5	5	14	18	21	0.857	811	849	0.955	Quarterfinals
5	Cignal HD Spikers	10	2	8	7	10	24	0.417	718	797	0.901	Quarterfinals
6	Mane 'n Tail Lady Stallions	10	2	8	7	10	24	0.417	713	809	0.881	Quarterfinals

Date	Time		Score		Set 1	Set 2	Set 3	Set 4	Set 5	Total	Report
21 March	14:30	Cignal HD Spikers	0–3	Foton Tornadoes	18–25	24–26	23–25			65–76	
21 March	16:30	Philips Gold Lady Slammers	0–3	Petron Blaze Spikers	16–25	18–25	23–25			57–75	
26 March	16:15	Petron Blaze Spikers	3–1	Foton Tornadoes	25–18	26–24	20–25	25–19		96–86	
26 March	18:15	Shopinas.com Lady Clickers	3–1	Mane 'n Tail Lady Stallions	25–22	25–22	16–25	25–12		91–81	
29 March	14:30	Philips Gold Lady Slammers	0–3	Shopinas.com Lady Clickers	18–25	24–26	27–29			69–80	
29 March	16:30	Mane 'n Tail Lady Stallions	3–0	Cignal HD Spikers	27–25	25–21	25–21			77–67	
30 March	16:15	Shopinas.com Lady Clickers	0–3	Foton Tornadoes	17–25	17–25	17–25			51–75	
30 March	18:15	Mane 'n Tail Lady Stallions	0–3	Philips Gold Lady Slammers	19–25	25–27	16–25			60–77	
06 April	16:15	Philips Gold Lady Slammers	0–3	Cignal HD Spikers	18–25	16–25	15–25			49–75	
06 April	18:15	Petron Blaze Spikers	3–2	Shopinas.com Lady Clickers	21–25	20–25	25–21	25–16	15–9	106–96	
09 April	16:15	Cignal HD Spikers	1–3	Petron Blaze Spikers	25–23	16–25	13–25	11–25		65–98	
09 April	18:15	Foton Tornadoes	3–1	Mane 'n Tail Lady Stallions	24–26	25–19	25–21	25–15		99–81	
11 April	14:30	Foton Tornadoes	2–3	Philips Gold Lady Slammers	18–25	26–24	21–25	25–15	13–15	103–104	
11 April	16:30	Petron Blaze Spikers	3–2	Mane 'n Tail Lady Stallions	25–27	25–22	25–16	17–25	16–14	108–104	
13 April	13:30	Cignal HD Spikers	0–3	Shopinas.com Lady Clickers	18–25	17–25	30–32			65–82	
13 April	16:15	Mane 'n Tail Lady Stallions	3–0	Foton Tornadoes	25–22	28–26	25–19			78–67	
13 April	18:15	Philips Gold Lady Slammers	1–3	Petron Blaze Spikers	23–25	16–25	25–22	17–25		81–97	
15 April	16:15	Shopinas.com Lady Clickers	2–3	Philips Gold Lady Slammers	11–25	25–16	20–25	25–13	11–15	92–94	
15 April	18:15	Petron Blaze Spikers	3–0	Cignal HD Spikers	25–18	25–19	26–24			76–61	
16 April	13:30	Shopinas.com Lady Clickers	3–0	Mane 'n Tail Lady Stallions	25–23	25–20	25–15			75–58	
16 April	16:15	Foton Tornadoes	0–3	Petron Blaze Spikers	19–25	20–25	14–25			53–75	
16 April	18:15	Philips Gold Lady Slammers	3–2	Cignal HD Spikers	25–19	23–25	22–25	25–21	15–10	110–100	
18 April	14:30	Foton Tornadoes	3–2	Philips Gold Lady Slammers	25–16	25–20	22–25	19–25	15–9	106–95	
18 April	16:30	Mane 'n Tail Lady Stallions	0–3	Petron Blaze Spikers	15–25	23–25	14–25			52–75	
18 April	18:30	Cignal HD Spikers	1–3	Shopinas.com Lady Clickers	23–25	25–27	25–17	19–25		92–94	
20 April	13:30	Philips Gold Lady Slammers	3–0	Mane 'n Tail Lady Stallions	25–21	25–20	25–20			75–61	
20 April	16:15	Foton Tornadoes	3–0	Cignal HD Spikers	25–23	25–15	25–15			75–53	
20 April	18:15	Petron Blaze Spikers	3–0	Shopinas.com Lady Clickers	25–19	25–12	25–23			75–54	
23 April	16:15	Cignal HD Spikers	3–0	Mane 'n Tail Lady Stallions	25–17	25–23	25–20			75–60	
23 April	18:15	Foton Tornadoes	2–3	Shopinas.com Lady Clickers	25–14	23–25	25–18	20–25	10–15	103–97	

== Playoffs ==
Quarterfinals (single-elimination)
4	Philips Gold	3
5	Cignal	2
3	Foton	3
6	Mane 'n Tail	0

Semifinals (single-elimination)
1	Petron	3
4	Philips Gold	0
2	Shopinas.com	3
6	Foton	2

Championship (best-of-three)
1	Petron	3	3	–
2	Shopinas.com	0	1	–

=== Quarterfinals ===
Date	Time		Score		Set 1	Set 2	Set 3	Set 4	Set 5	Total	Report
25 April	14:30	Philips Gold Lady Slammers	3–2	Cignal HD Spikers	21–25	25–23	25–9	18–25	20–18	109–100	
25 April	16:30	Foton Tornadoes	3–0	Mane 'n Tail Lady Stallions	25–17	25–22	25–19			75–58	

=== Semifinals ===
Date	Time		Score		Set 1	Set 2	Set 3	Set 4	Set 5	Total	Report
27 April	13:30	Petron Blaze Spikers	3–0	Philips Gold Lady Slammers	25–14	25–23	25–18			75–55	
27 April	16:15	Shopinas.com Lady Clickers	3–2	Foton Tornadoes	22–25	25–23	25–19	21–25	17–15	110–107	

=== Fifth place match ===
Date	Time		Score		Set 1	Set 2	Set 3	Set 4	Set 5	Total	Report
27 April	18:15	Cignal HD Spikers	3–1	Mane 'n Tail Lady Stallions	20–25	25–23	25–18	25–23		95–89	

=== Third place match ===
Date	Time		Score		Set 1	Set 2	Set 3	Set 4	Set 5	Total	Report
11 May	18:15	Philips Gold Lady Slammers	3–2	Foton Tornadoes	25–20	25–20	15–25	17–25	15–11	97–101	

=== Championship ===
Date	Time		Score		Set 1	Set 2	Set 3	Set 4	Set 5	Total	Report
11 May	16:15	Petron Blaze Spikers	3–0	Shopinas.com Lady Clickers	25–18	25–14	25–19			75–51	
14 May	16:15	Shopinas.com Lady Clickers	1–3	Petron Blaze Spikers	17–25	22–25	30–28	17–25		86–103	

== Final standing ==
Rank	Team
1st place, gold medalist(s)	Petron Blaze Spikers
2nd place, silver medalist(s)	Shopinas.com Lady Clickers
3rd place, bronze medalist(s)	Philips Gold Lady Slammers
4	Foton Tornadoes
5	Cignal HD Spikers
6	Mane 'n Tail Lady Stallions

2015 Philippine Super Liga All-Filipino Conference
Petron Blaze Spikers
2nd title
Team roster

Mary Grace Masangkay, Abigail Maraño, Rachel Daquis, Carmina Aganon, Luisa Mae Zapanta, Jozza Cabalsa, Frances Xinia Molina, Alexa Micek, Ivy Perez, Ana Ma. Del Mundo, Jennylyn Reyes, Mecaila Irish May Morada (c), Fille Cayetano, Aleona Denise Manabat
Head coach
George Pascua

== Awards ==
=== Individual awards ===
Award		Women's
MVP		Rachel Daquis
Best Outside Spiker	1st:	Charleen Abigail Cruz
Best Outside Spiker	2nd:	Patty Jane Orendain
Best Middle Blocker	1st:	Aleona Denise Manabat
Best Middle Blocker	2nd:	Abigail Maraño
Best Opposite Spiker		Michele Gumabao
Best Setter		Iris Tolenada
Best Libero		Jennylyn Reyes

=== Skill set leaders ===
Skill	Women's
Spiking	Aleona Manabat
Setting	Iris Tolenada
Serving	Aleona Manabat
Blocking	Jeanette Panaga
Receiving	Angelique Dionela
Digging	Jennylyn Reyes

== Venues ==
- Cuneta Astrodome (main venue)
- Mall of Asia Arena (March 21 - opening day)
- Filoil Flying V Arena (March 29 and March 30)
- Alonte Sports Arena ("Spike on Tour" / March 26, April 9 and April 18)
- Quezon Convention Center ("Spike on Tour" / April 25)
- Imus Sports Complex ("Spike on Tour" / May 11 / Finals Game 1)

== Broadcast partners ==
- AksyonTV, Sports5.ph
- Solar Sports
