= Michele Gumabao =

Filipino volleyball player and beauty queen (born 1992)

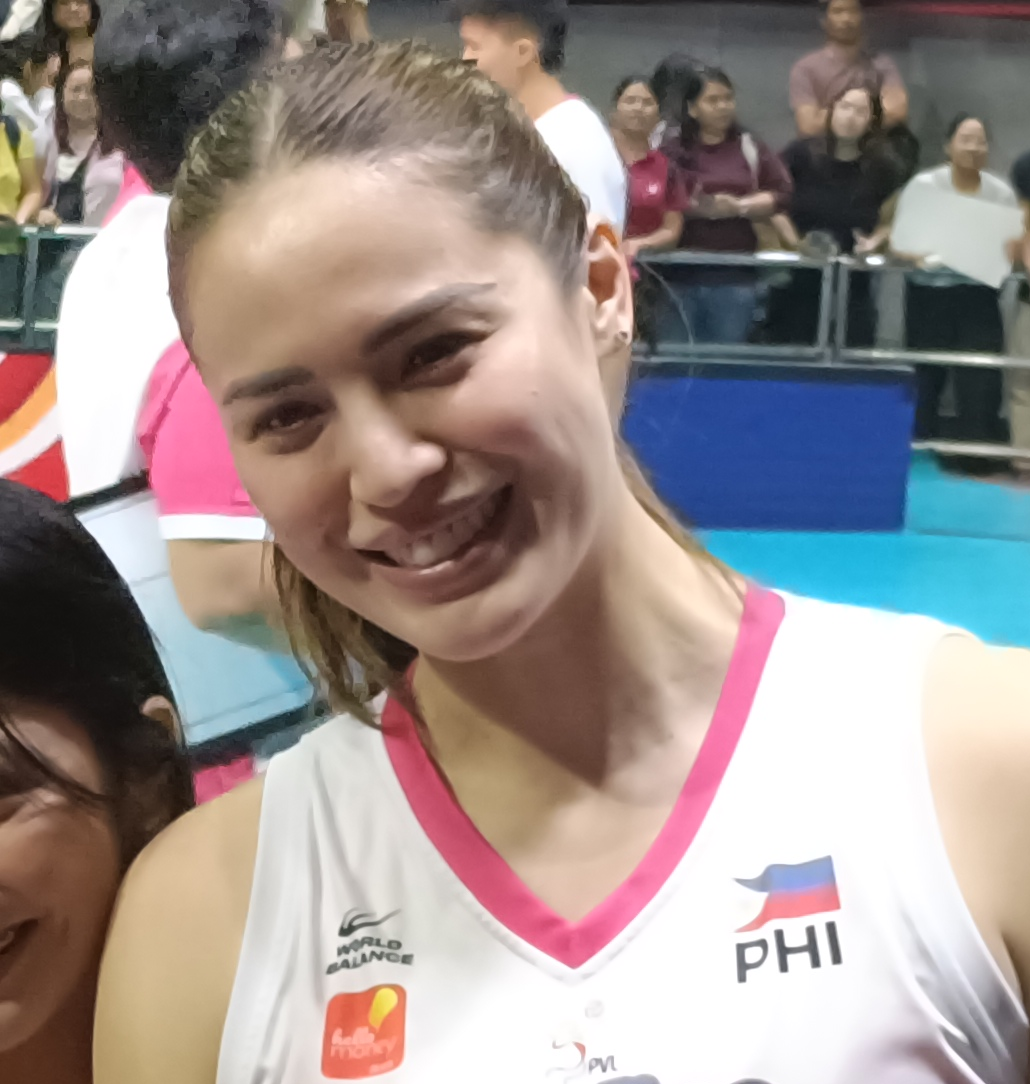
- Gumabao in 2025
- Born: Michele Theresa Imperial Gumabao; September 2, 1992 (age 34); San Mateo, California, U.S.
- Education: School of the Holy Spirit of Quezon City; De La Salle University (B.S.)
- Occupations: Volleyball player; television host; politician
- Height: 1.78 m (5 ft 10 in)
- Spouse: Aldo Panlilio (m. 2025)
- Father: Dennis Roldan
- Relatives: Marco Gumabao (brother); Paolo Gumabao (half-brother); Isabel Rivas (aunt); Gretchen Fullido (cousin)
- Beauty pageant titleholder
- Title: Binibining Pilipinas Globe 2018
- Major competitions: Binibining Pilipinas 2018; (Winner – Binibining Pilipinas Globe 2018); The Miss Globe 2018; (TOP 15); Miss Universe Philippines 2020; (2nd Runner-Up)
- Volleyball career
- Home town: Quezon City, Philippines
- Education: De La Salle
- Height: 1.78 m (5 ft 10 in)
- Weight: 90 kg (200 lb)
- Spike: 288 cm (113 in)
- Block: 278 cm (109 in)
- Position: Opposite hitter
- Current club: Creamline Cool Smashers

Career
- Years: Team
- 2013: PCSO
- 2014: AirAsia
- 2014: Generika
- 2015–2016: Philips Gold / Pocari Sweat
- 2017: Cocolife
- 2018–: Creamline

National team
- Years: Team
- 2015, 2022–2023: Philippines

Michele Theresa Imperial Gumabao-Panlilio (Tagalog: [miˈʃɛl guˈmɐbaʊ]; born September 2, 1992) is a Filipino professional volleyball player and beauty pageant titleholder who is an opposite hitter for the Creamline Cool Smashers of the Premier Volleyball League (PVL). She was named Best Opposite Hitter seven times in her professional career and was the Finals MVP in the 2016 Shakey's V-League Reinforced Conference.

She played collegiate volleyball for the De La Salle Lady Spikers, winning the UAAP title three consecutive times. She was named "Best blocker" twice and as co-captain of the team, she was named Finals MVP in her last season.

She has appeared on television as a sports analyst, and was a celebrity housemate in Pinoy Big Brother: All In (2014), where she lasted for 57 days. She also ventured into beauty pageants. She was crowned Binibining Pilipinas Globe in 2018, and represented the Philippines at The Miss Globe later that year, placing in the top fifteen. In 2020, she was the second runner-up in the first edition of Miss Universe Philippines.

Actor-politician Dennis Roldan (Mitchell Gumabao) is her father, while actor Marco Gumabao is her brother.

== Personal life ==
Michele Theresa Imperial Gumabao was born in San Mateo, California, on September 2, 1992. She studied in School of the Holy Spirit of Quezon City before going to De La Salle University, where she was a consistent dean's lister. In October 2013, Gumabao graduated with a Bachelor of Science degree with a major in marketing management.

She is the daughter of former PBA player and actor Dennis Roldan, the sister of actor Marco Gumabao, and the cousin of TV anchor Gretchen Fullido.

In August 2024, Gumabao revealed that she was engaged to San Miguel Beermen strength and conditioning coach Aldo Panlilio. The couple were married on February 25, 2025, at the National Shrine of the Sacred Heart in Makati.

== Volleyball career ==
Gumabao was a member of the women's volleyball team of De La Salle University for four years (2010–2013), during which the team won three consecutive championship titles in the UAAP. She was two-time Best Blocker in seasons 73 and 74 and the Finals Most Valuable Player in season 75. Gumabao did not play in her final year of eligibility in the UAAP after her graduation.

In 2013, she played in the Philippine Super Liga for the PCSO Bingo Milyonaryo Puffins. In 2014, she joined the AirAsia Flying Spikers for the 2014 All-Filipino Conference. Gumabao did not play at the start of the tournament because she joined the Pinoy Big Brother show. After her eviction from Pinoy Big Brother: All-In on June 22, 2014, Gumabao resumed playing for AirAsia, helping the team to a fourth-place finish in the tournament. In the 2014 Philippine Super Liga Grand Prix Conference, she played for the Generika Lifesavers, which took over the AirAsia team. For the 2015 Philippine Super Liga season, she joined the Philips Gold Lady Slammers (later known as the Pocari Sweat Lady Warriors), where she was named team captain.

On January 11, 2017, Gumabao announced her departure from the Pocari Sweat franchise following her decision not to renew her contract due to a falling out with the team management. A week later, she joined the new volleyball team United VC for their participation in the 2017 season of the PSL.

Gumabao joined Creamline Cool Smashers in March 2018 for the Premier Volleyball League along with Alyssa Valdez, Jia Morado and her former college teammate, Mel Gohing. In July 2018, the team won its first PVL championship in the Reinforced Conference and in December, the team won the Premier Volleyball League Open Conference.

In January 2022, she announced that she is taking an indefinite leave from playing to focus on the 2022 elections.

=== Coaching ===
In January 2016, Gumabao joined the Adamson University Lady Falcons as an assistant coach for UAAP Season 78.

In June 2017, she became the camp director of the Alaska Volleyball Powercamp in Baguio City.

=== Clubs ===
- (Philippines) PCSO Bingo Milyonaryo Puffins (2013)
- (Philippines) AirAsia Flying Spikers (2014)
- (Philippines) Generika Lifesavers (2014)
- (Philippines) Philips Gold Lady Slammers / Philips Gold Lady Slammers (2015–2016)
- (Philippines) Cocolife Asset Managers (2017)
- (Philippines) Creamline Cool Smashers (2018–present)

=== Awards ===
==== Individuals ====
- UAAP Season 73 "Best blocker"
- UAAP Season 74 "Best blocker"
- UAAP Season 75 "Finals Most Valuable Player"
- 2015 Philippine Super Liga All-Filipino "Best opposite spiker"
- 2015 Philippine Super Liga Grand Prix "1st Best Opposite Spiker"
- Shakey's V-League 13th Season Open Conference "Best opposite spiker"
- Shakey's V-League 13th Season Reinforced Conference "Best opposite spiker"
- Shakey's V-League 13th Season Reinforced Conference "Finals Most Valuable Player"
- 2018 Premier Volleyball League Reinforced Conference "Best opposite spiker"
- 2023 Premier Volleyball League First All-Filipino Conference "Best opposite spiker"
- 2023 Premier Volleyball League Second All-Filipino Conference “Best Opposite Spiker”
- 2024 Premier Volleyball League Invitational Conference "Most Valuable Player"

==== Club ====
- 2016 Shakey's V-League Open Conference – champion with Pocari Sweat Lady Warriors
- 2016 Shakey's V-League Reinforced Open Conference – champion with Pocari Sweat Lady Warriors
- 2018 Premier Volleyball League Reinforced Conference – champion with Creamline Cool Smashers
- 2018 Premier Volleyball League Open Conference – champion with Creamline Cool Smashers
- 2019 Premier Volleyball League Reinforced Conference – runner-up with Creamline Cool Smashers
- 2019 Premier Volleyball League Open Conference – champion with Creamline Cool Smashers
- 2021 Premier Volleyball League Open Conference – runner-up with Creamline Cool Smashers
- 2022 Premier Volleyball League Open Conference – champion with Creamline Cool Smashers
- 2022 Premier Volleyball League Invitational Conference – champion with Creamline Cool Smashers
- 2022 Premier Volleyball League Reinforced Conference – Bronze with Creamline Cool Smashers
- 2023 Premier Volleyball League First All-Filipino Conference – champion with Creamline Cool Smashers
- 2023 Premier Volleyball League Invitational Conference – runner-up with Creamline Cool Smashers
- 2023 Premier Volleyball League Second All-Filipino Conference – Champions, with Creamline Cool Smashers
- 2024 Premier Volleyball League All-Filipino Conference – Champions, with Creamline Cool Smashers
- 2024 Premier Volleyball League Reinforced Conference – Champions, with Creamline Cool Smashers
- 2024 Premier Volleyball League Invitational Conference – Champions, with Creamline Cool Smashers

== Television ==
Gumabao plans on pursuing a career in marketing or television hosting.

In 2013, she served as a Shakey's V-League analyst. On March 17, 2013, she appeared on ABS-CBN's talk show, Gandang Gabi Vice with her teammate, Mika Reyes and two members of their rival school's team, the Lady Eagles, Fille Cainglet and Gretchen Ho. On March 20, 2013, she also appeared in the segment "Ihaw Na!" on ABS-CBN's gag show, Banana Nite. She participated in ABS-CBN's Kapamilya All-Star Volleyball Game, which was held on October 6, 2013. The event is part of the network's 60th anniversary celebration. In 2014, she became a Star Magic talent.

In January 2016, Gumabao joined ABS-CBN Sports+Action as a game analyst for NCAA Season 91 volleyball.

On April 27, 2014, Gumabao entered the Pinoy Big Brother house as one of the celebrity housemates along with Jane Oineza, Alex Gonzaga and Daniel Matsunaga in its 11th season which features adults, teens and celebrities. She was evicted on Day 57 on June 22, 2014.

== Pageantry ==
=== Binibining Pilipinas 2018 ===
On January 16, 2018, it was confirmed that Gumabao will be competing at the Binibining Pilipinas 2018 pageant.

On March 18, she was crowned as Binibining Pilipinas Globe 2018.

=== The Miss Globe 2018 ===
She represented the Philippines in The Miss Globe 2018 beauty pageant. Gumabao won the Miss Social Media and Dream Girl awards while finishing at the top 15.

=== Miss Universe Philippines 2020 ===
Gumabao represented Quezon City at the Miss Universe Philippines 2020 pageant, the first edition of Miss Universe Philippines. During the preliminaries, she was the recipient of a special sponsor award, Miss MG Philippines. In the finale, she finished second runner-up behind titleholder Rabiya Mateo of Iloilo City and first runner-up Ysabella Ysmael of Parañaque.

== Endorsements ==
She has endorsed the sanitary napkin brand, Modess and she also endorses Toby's Sports, one the Philippines’ top sports retail establishments, along with basketball player James Yap and Azkals goalkeeper, Neil Etheridge.

In January 2016, Gumabao became a brand ambassador of Akari lighting products.

== Politics ==
Gumabao is a convenor of the women's group Magdalena Mission: Alagang Ate ("Care of an Older Sister"). Magdalena, partnered with the National Task Force to End Local Communist Armed Conflict (NTF-ELCAC), aims to empower young women and guide them away from communist recruitment. Gumabao is the group's advocate for women's psychosocial empowerment and mental health. As of 2020 and 2021, she is an ambassadress for the Philippine National Police's Kabataan Kontra Droga at Terorismo (lit. 'Youth Against Drugs and Terrorism') program.

On October 8, 2021, she filed her candidacy for the 2022 elections as the second nominee of Mothers for Change (MOCHA) party-list.

== Filmography ==
=== Television ===
Year	Title	Network	Notes
2013	Shakey's V-League (Season 10)	GMA News TV	Analyst (Open Conference)
2013–2014	Sports Pilipinas	GMA News TV	Contributor
2014	Pinoy Big Brother: All In	ABS-CBN	Housemate
2016	NCAA Season 91 volleyball tournaments	ABS-CBN Sports+Action	Analyst
2020–2021	Wowowin	GMA Network	Guest Co-Host
2022	NCAA Season 97 volleyball tournaments	GTV	Analyst

Awards and achievements
Preceded by Cha Cruz	UAAP Women's Volleyball Finals MVP; Season 75	Succeeded by Alyssa Valdez
Preceded by Nelda Ibe	Binibining Pilipinas Globe; 2018	Succeeded by Leren Mae Bautista
Preceded by Inaugural	Miss Universe Philippines 2nd runner-up 2020	Succeeded by Steffi Rose Aberasturi
