= Fit To Hit: Philippine Beach Volleyball Invitational =

Beach volleyball competition in the Philippines

Fit To Hit
- Sport: Beach volleyball
- Founded: 2015
- Founder: Solar Sports, Sports Vision Management Group, Inc.
- First season: 2015
- No. of teams: 8
- Country: Philippines
- Venues: The Sands, SM By The Bay
- Most recent champion: (New Zealand) Ceres
- Broadcaster: Solar Sports

Fit To Hit: Philippine Beach Volleyball Invitational is the inaugural tournament of Fit To Hit, a beach volleyball league organized by Sports Vision Management Group, Inc. (organizer of the Shakey's V-League and Spikers' Turf indoor volleyball leagues) and Solar Sports.

The Invitational is an international tournament held on September 25–27, 2015 at The Sands, SM By the Bay of the SM Mall of Asia Complex, Pasay. It was televised on the Solar Sports channel on a delayed basis.

After the Invitational, Fit To Hit will stage beach volleyball circuit legs in different cities across the Philippines, as part of the development program for the beach volleyball.

== Tournament format ==
The eight teams will participate in the tournament, will be divided into two four-team groups. The teams will first undergo a single round robin preliminary round, while 4 teams will moved over to the semifinals. The two teams that will win in the semifinals, will advance to the finals. Classification matches will also be played for the 6 remaining teams.

== Teams ==
The tournament is among teams from Hong Kong, Malaysia, New Zealand and the Philippines. Teams from China, Hong Kong, Singapore, Indonesia and Vietnam backed out of the competition because LVPI withdrew its support.

| Country | Team | Players Name | Group |
|---|---|---|---|
| Hong Kong | Mamy Poko Pants | Win Tung To and Yung Yung Koo | B |
| Hong Kong | Rubbermaid | Wai Yan Lo and Rachel Tam | A |
| Malaysia | BYD | Luk Teck Hua and Beh Shun Thing | B |
| Malaysia | Paşabahçe | Low Mei Cing and Nuraini Binti Arriffin | A |
| New Zealand | Ceres | Julia Tilley and Shauna Polley | A |
| Philippines | Philips Gold | Bea Tan and Lindsay Dowd | A |
| Philippines | Mane N' Tail | Charo Soriano and Alexa Micek | B |
| Philippines | ShopTV | Gretchel Soltones and Lou Ann Latigay | B |

== Final ranking ==
Total amount of prizes that will given away to the eight teams, to be divided based on their placings: $19,000 Dollars

| Rank | Team |
|---|---|
| 1st place, gold medalist(s) | (New Zealand) Ceres |
| 2nd place, silver medalist(s) | (Hong Kong) Mamy Poko Pants |
| 3rd place, bronze medalist(s) | (Hong Kong) Rubbermaid |
| 4 | (Philippines) Mane 'n Tail |
| 5 | (Malaysia) BYD |
| 6 | (Malaysia) Paşabahçe |
| 7 | (Philippines) Philips Gold |
| 8 | (Philippines) ShopTV |

== See also ==
- Solar Sports
