= Fille Cayetano =

Filipino volleyball player (born 1990)

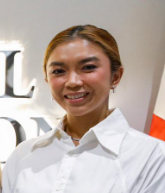
- Cayetano in 2026

Personal information
- Nationality: Filipino
- Born: Fille Saint Merced Nombres Cainglet; January 30, 1990 (age 36); Bacolod, Philippines
- Height: 1.68 m (5 ft 6 in)
- Weight: 57 kg (126 lb)
- Education: Ateneo de Manila University

Volleyball information
- Position: Open Spiker

Career
Years	Teams
2013–2015	Meralco Power Spikers
2013–2016	Petron Blaze Spikers
2017	Pocari Sweat Lady Warriors
2018–2023	Creamline Cool Smashers

Fille Saint Merced Nombres Cainglet-Cayetano (born January 30, 1990) is a Filipino former professional volleyball player who last played for the Creamline Cool Smashers in the Premier Volleyball League (PVL). Fille also played for the Petron Blaze Spikers in the Philippine Super Liga (PSL) from 2013 to 2016.

== Career ==
Cainglet started playing volleyball in fifth grade with her classmates at St. Scholastica's College Manila. Cainglet enjoyed and excelled in the sport and became a member of the varsity volleyball team of St. Scholastica's College Manila in high school. After graduating from high school, she together with four other blue-chipped high school volleyball players was recruited by Ateneo De Manila University, where she played varsity volleyball for five years and was named team captain of the 2011 Ateneo Lady Eagles Volleyball Team. This group of five recruits were to be later called the Fab 5 by the Ateneo community. Cainglet played Beach Volleyball Republic Christmas Open at the SM Sands by the Bay, December 19–20, 2015 with Denden Lazaro.

In the 2018, Cayetano moved to Creamline Cool Smashers and won the open conference championships.

== Personal life ==
Cainglet married Lino Cayetano, then the congressional representative of Taguig–Pateros's 2nd congressional district on December 27, 2013. In May 2014, Cainglet gave birth to the couple's first child, a son. In August 2016, the couple had their second child, a daughter. Cainglet gave birth to their third child, a daughter, in March 2018. In October 2026, she announced that they are expecting their fourth child .

== Clubs ==
- (Philippines) Meralco Power Spikers (2013–2015)
- (Philippines) Petron Blaze Spikers (2013–2016)
- (Philippines) Pocari Sweat Lady Warriors (2017)
- (Philippines) Creamline Cool Smashers (2018–2023)

== Awards ==
=== Individuals ===
- 2011 Shakey's V-League – Season 8 (1st Conference) "Most Improved Player"

=== Club Team ===
- 2013 PSL Invitational Conference – 3rd place, with Petron Blaze Spikers
- 2014 PSL Grand Prix Conference – Champions, with Petron Blaze Spikers
- 2015 PSL All-Filipino Conference – Champions, with Petron Blaze Spikers
- 2015 PSL Grand Prix Conference – Runner-up, with Petron Blaze Spikers
- 2017 PVL Reinforced Conference – Champions, with Pocari Sweat Lady Warriors
- 2017 PVL Open Conference – Runner-up, with Pocari Sweat Lady Warriors
- 2018 PVL Open Conference – Champions, with Creamline Cool Smashers
- 2019 PVL Open Conference – Champions, with Creamline Cool Smashers
- 2022 PVL Open Conference – Champions, with Creamline Cool Smashers
- 2022 PVL Invitational Conference – Champions, with Creamline Cool Smashers
- 2022 PVL Reinforced Conference – 3rd place, with Creamline Cool Smashers
- 2023 PVL All-Filipino Conference – Champions, with Creamline Cool Smashers
- 2023 PVL Invitational Conference – Runner-up, with Creamline Cool Smashers
