= Charo Soriano =

Filipino volleyball player and coach

Maria Rosario Soriano

Member of the Tuguegarao City Council
- Incumbent
- Assumed office June 30, 2022

Personal details
- Born: Maria Rosario Bollozos Soriano; October 14, 1985 (age 41) Cagayan de Oro, Philippines
- Party: NPC (2021–present)
- Nickname: Charo
- Volleyball career

Personal information
- Hometown: Tuguegarao, Cagayan, Philippines
- Height: 5 ft 8 in (1.73 m)
- Weight: 135 lb (61 kg)
- Education: Ateneo de Manila University

Volleyball information
- Position: Open/Middle Hitter

Maria Rosario Bollozos Soriano (born October 14, 1985) known as Charo Soriano, is a Filipino volleyball player, coach, and politician. Soriano is one of the founders of Beach Volleyball Republic, an outdoor volleyball tournament, and a board member of the Philippine National Volleyball Federation. She also serves as a city councilor of Tuguegarao since 2022.

== Early life ==
Soriano was born to Jefferson Soriano, a former mayor of Tuguegarao, and Eleanor Bollozos.

== Volleyball career ==
During her collegiate playing career for the Ateneo Lady Eagles, she played indoor and beach volleyball. After playing with the Ateneo Lady Eagles from 2003 to 2008, she worked as assistant coach for the team from 2012 to 2014. Soriano led the Eagles to victory in the Shakey's V-League Season 8, 1st Conference as head coach. In 2013, she played for the Smart Maynilad Net Spikers in the Shakey's V-League Soriano joined PLDT Home Ultera Ultra Fast Hitters from the Shakey's V-League, for the 2014 Shakey's V-League 11th Season Open Conference and the 2015 Shakey's V-League 12th Season Reinforced Open Conference.

In beach volleyball, Soriano played in the 2015 PSL Beach Volleyball Challenge Cup with Petron XCS and the 2015 Fit To Hit: Philippine Beach Volleyball Invitational Mane 'n Tail. She won the Silver Medal in the 2015 Beach Volleyball Republic Christmas Open and later represented The Philippines partnering Alexa Micek in the 2015 Spike For Peace Women’s International Beach Volleyball. She played with Micek the Beach Volleyball Republic tournaments since 2015. She is one of the co-founders of Beach Volleyball Republic.

For the 2016 Shakey's V-League 13th Season Open Conference season, she acted as playing coach for the club BaliPure Purest Water Defenders.

== Political career ==
Soriano announced on October 6, 2021, that she would be seeking political office as councilor in her hometown, Tuguegarao, for the 2022 Philippine local election. She was elected to a three-year term after placing second in the official tally.

On July 25, 2022, she was elected president of the Cagayan chapter of the Philippine Councilors League, making her an ex officio member of the Cagayan Provincial Board. She was reelected as city councilor in 2025.

== Clubs ==
- (Philippines) Ateneo Lady Eagles (2003-2008)
- (Philippines) Smart-Maynilad Net Spikers (2013)
- (Philippines) PLDT Home Ultera Ultra Fast Hitters (2014-2015)
- (Philippines) BaliPure Purest Water Defenders (2016)
- (Philippines) Perlas Spikers (2017) - team manager

== Awards ==
=== Individuals ===
- 2003-2004 UAAP Season 66 "Rookie of the Year"
- 2006 Home and Away Invitational League "Best Server"
- 2007 Shakey's V-League Season 4 2nd Conference "Most Energetic Player"
- 2007–2008 UAAP Season 70 "Best Scorer"
- 2007–2008 UAAP Season 70 "Best Receiver"
- 2008 Shakey's V-League Season 5 1st Conference "Most Improved Player"
- 2008 Shakey's V-League Season 5 1st Conference "Best Blocker"

== See also ==
- Beach Volleyball Republic
- Perlas Spikers
