= Francis Vicente =

Filipino volleyball coach

Personal information
- Full name: Francis John Patrick Vicente
- Nationality: Filipino
- Education: University of Santo Tomas

Coaching information
- Previous teams coached
- Years: Teams
  - 2012–2013 2014 2014–2018 2015 2016–2017 2017 2017: University of Santo Tomas H.S. (girls); National University (women's); PLDT HOME TVolution (men's); University of the East (women's); Mane 'n Tail / Philips Gold; Generika Lifesavers; Philippines (women's); Rebisco-PSL Manila

Francis John Patrick Vicente is a Filipino volleyball coach. He was the head coach of the Philippines women's national volleyball team in 2017. He also mentored the women's collegiate team of the National University Bulldogs 2010 - 2013 and University of the East Warriors from 2014 - 2018 and the Philips Gold Lady Slammers and Generika Lifesavers volleyball club of the Philippine Super Liga.

He has also coached the Philippine Super Liga All-Stars team which participated at the 2017 Asian Women's Club Volleyball Championship.

== Coaching career ==
=== School volleyball ===
Vicente started as a volunteer assistant coach from 1991-1993 and later on given a full pledge appointment as assistant coach to Coach August Saint Maria. Vicente was appointed as the head coach of the girls' team of the University of Santo Tomas High School which won straight titles in the UAAP juniors under his helm.

He mentored the National University women's team to the Final Four campaign in the 2012–13 season of the UAAP. He later went on to become the Head Coach of Mane 'n Tail Lady Stallions that changed their name to Philips Gold Lady Slammers that won bronze medal (all Filipino and Reinforce Conference). In May 2014, he was appointed as head coach of the women's team of the University of the East (UE) until 2018. In 2018, Francis Vicente was called upon by a Volleyball official to Head a Women's National Team abroad to participate in the Micronesian Olympic Games in YAP. His National team received Silver Medal finish after 48 years.

=== Club ===
==== Domestic ====
Vicente has coached various teams at the Philippine Super Liga. In 2015, Vicente led the Mane 'n Tail Lady Stallions which later on became Philips Gold Lady Slammers. Several years later he guided the Generika Lifesavers to a fifth place finish at the 2016 PSL Grand Prix Conference.

==== International ====
The PLDT HOME TVolution team that participated at the 2014 Asian Men's Club Volleyball Championship was coached by Vicente. In May 2017, Vicente was appointed head coach of the Philippine Super Liga selection team which participated at the 2017 Asian Women's Club Volleyball Championship under the name "Rebisco PSL Manila". 2018 Vicente was called upon to act as Head Coach for a Women's National Team abroad (RMI Women's National Volleyball Team)

=== National team ===
Vicente has mentored the youth team of the Philippines. In January 2017, he was officially appointed by the Larong Volleyball sa Pilipinas as the head coach of the Philippines women's senior national volleyball team. He was among the 23 coaches who were vying for the position.

== Other ==
In the year 1991-2010 Vicente was working at the University of Santo Tomas as an assistant professor and 2009-2010 he served as the Institute of Physical Education and Athletics Moderator.
