= Beach Volleyball Republic =

Filipino organization

- Sport: Beach Volleyball
- Founded: 2015
- Country: Philippines
- Most recent champions: W: Melody Pons and Sheena Cafe; M: Johnwayne Dionela and Rain Skyler Gemarino
- Broadcaster: ABS-CBN
- Website: Beach Volleyball Republic

Beach Volleyball Republic, Inc. (BVR) is an organization aimed at the development of beach volleyball in the Philippines. It was formed in June 2015.

== History ==
Co-founded by former volleybelle, Ateneo Lady Eagles, and current professional players Charo Soriano, Gretchen Ho, Fille Cainglet-Cayetano, Dzi Gervacio and Bea Tan. BVR organized beach volleyball tournaments in different beaches and public places in the Philippines. They also organized grassroots development programs for the young and aspiring players, in addition to the professional circuit tours thru the Beach Royals program. The first legs were held at the SM Sands By the Bay court on June 20 and July 11, 2015.

In December 2015, BVR made its 4-hour live telecast debut in ABS-CBN Sports and Action with 16 women's teams competing. In 2016, BVR forged a partnership agreement with ABS-CBN Sports for a 4 part magazine show and the live airing of the semifinals and finals of the program's events like the Boracay leg of the BVR on Tour on April 27–28. In June 2016, the BVR officially attempted to get support from the Larong Volleyball sa Pilipinas (LVPI), the country's volleyball NSA, through its LVPI-sanctioned BVR Invitationals, where international teams competed in a three-day event successfully held at Anguib Beach, Santa Ana, Cagayan.

In November 2020, the BVR was reportedly considered turning into a professional league. This is due government regulations at that time where they only allowed professional leagues to hold games due to the COVID-19 pandemic. However, in February 2021, the league organizers forego going pro.

== King and Queen of the Sands ==
The BVR's first tournament was the Queen of Sands tournament on June 20, 2015. The format used for the women's beach volleyball tournament allowed for players to compete with and against different players each game instead of having the same partner throughout the tournament. The top four individual players with the most points figuring in the final. Fiola Mae Caballos of Central Philippine University is the winner of the inaugural tournament. A second tournament, the King and Queen of the Sands was held in July 2015. The tournament featured both men and women.

== Christmas Open ==
The 2015 Beach Volleyball Republic Christmas Open was held in the SM Sands By the Bay on December 19–20, 2015. The tournament involved 10 teams, which were split into two pools which competed in a single round-robin elimination format. A draw was held before the tournament proper to determine the placings of the teams and the schedule. The top two teams advanced to a cross-over semifinals round, and the winners of the semifinals matches moved on to the finals. The winner of the open received 100,000 thousand pesos cash prize. Live telecast of the semifinals and finals matches was aired via ABS-CBN Sports+Action.

Participating teams

Group	Players
Pool A	Arielle Estrañero and Vina Alinas
Pool A	Bea Tan and Rupia Inck Furtado
Pool A	Judy Ann Caballejo and Anna Camille Abanto
Pool A	Julie Ann Sinamban and Mariel Tiangco
Pool A	Charo Soriano and Alexa Micek
Pool B	Fille Cainglet-Cayetano and Denise Michelle Lazaro
Pool B	Rose Cailing and April Romero
Pool B	Shiela Marie Pineda and Janine Marciano
Pool B	Michelle Morente and Mich Otoshi
Pool B	April Ross Hingpit and Maica Morada

=== Preliminary round ===
Pool A

Pos	Team	Pld	W	L	Pts	SW	SL	SR	SPW	SPL	SPR	Qualification
1	Soriano–Micek	4	3	1	7	6	2	3.000	162	109	1.486	Semifinals
2	Tan–Inck Furtado	4	3	1	7	7	3	2.333	179	148	1.209	Semifinals
3	Caballejo–Abanto	3	2	1	5	4	3	1.333	119	117	1.017	
4	Estrañero–Alinas	3	1	2	4	3	4	0.750	110	97	1.134	
5	Sinamban–Tiangco	4	0	4	4	0	8	0.000	83	168	0.494	

Pool B

Pos	Team	Pld	W	L	Pts	SW	SL	SR	SPW	SPL	SPR	Qualification
1	Pineda–Marciano	4	4	0	8	8	0	MAX	169	108	1.565	Semifinals
2	Hingpit–Morada	4	3	1	7	6	2	3.000	154	123	1.252	Semifinals
3	Cainglet–Lazaro	4	2	2	6	2	4	0.500	99	107	0.925	
4	Morente-Otoshi	4	1	3	5	2	4	0.500	91	120	0.758	
5	Cailing–Romero	4	0	4	4	0	8	0.000	113	168	0.673	

=== Match results ===
Pool A

Date	Time		Score		Set 1	Set 2	Set 3	Total	Report
Dec 19	09:00	Estrañero–Alinas	1–2	Tan–Inck Furtado	19–21	21–19	6–15	46–55	Report
Dec 19	10:15	Caballejo–Abanto	2–0	Sinamban–Tiangco	21–15	21–10	–	42–25	Report
Dec 19	11:15	Soriano–Micek	0–2	Tan–Inck Furtado	18–21	18–21	–	36–42	Report
Dec 19	12:15	Sinamban–Tiangco	0–2	Estrañero–Alinas	9–21	15–21	–	24–42	Report
Dec 19	14:30	Soriano–Micek	2–0	Caballejo–Abanto	21–14	21–13	–	42–27	Report
Dec 19	15:30	Tan–Inck Furtado	2–0	Sinamban–Tiangco	21–9	21–7	–	42–16	Report
Dec 19	16:30	Estrañero–Alinas	0–2	Soriano–Micek	12–21	10–21	–	22–42	Report
Dec 19	17:30	Caballejo–Abanto	2–1	Tan–Inck Furtado	14–21	21–10	15–9	50–40	Report
Dec 20	09:00	Soriano–Micek	2–0	Sinamban–Tiangco	21–7	21–11	–	42–18	
Dec 20	11:00	Estrañero–Alinas	0–0	Caballejo–Abanto	0–0	0–0	–	0–0	

Pool B

Date	Time		Score		Set 1	Set 2	Set 3	Total	Report
Dec 19	08:00	Cainglet–Lazaro	2–0	Cailing–Romero	21–16	21–19	–	42–35	Report
Dec 19	09:45	Pineda–Marciano	2–0	Morente–Otoshi	21–9	21–13	–	42-22	Report
Dec 19	10:45	Hingpit–Morada	2–0	Cailing–Romero	21–13	21–13	–	42–26	Report
Dec 19	11:45	Cainglet–Lazaro	0–2	Pineda–Marciano	9–21	20–22	–	29–43	Report
Dec 19	14:00	Morente–Otoshi	0–2	Hingpit–Morada	17–21	18–21	–	35–42	Report
Dec 19	14:50	Pineda–Marciano	2–0	Cailing–Romero	21–14	21–15	–	42–29	Report
Dec 19	16:00	Hingpit–Morada	2–0	Cainglet–Lazaro	21–10	21–10	–	42–20	Report
Dec 19	17:00	Cailing–Romero	0–2	Morente–Otoshi	15–21	8–21	–	23–42	Report
Dec 20	08:00	Hingpit–Morada	0–2	Pineda–Marciano	13–21	15–21	–	28–42	
Dec 20	10:00	Morente–Otoshi	0–0	Cainglet–Lazaro	–	–	–	–	

=== Final round ===
Semifinals

Date	Time		Score		Set 1	Set 2	Set 3	Total	Report
Dec 20	14:00	Soriano–Micek	2–0	Hingpit–Morada	23–21	21–15	–	44–36	
Dec 20	15:00	Tan–Inck Furtado	2–0	Pineda–Marciano	21–11	21–17	–	42–28	

3rd place

Date	Time		Score		Set 1	Set 2	Set 3	Total	Report
Dec 20	16:00	Pineda–Marciano	2–0	Hingpit–Morada	21–15	21–8	–	42–23	

=== Finals ===
Date	Time		Score		Set 1	Set 2	Set 3	Total	Report
Dec 20	17:00	Soriano–Micek	1–2	Tan–Inck Furtado	21–17	22–24	12–15	55–56	

Semifinals
Dec 20
Soriano–Micek	2
Hingpit–Morada	0
Dec 20
Tan–Inck Furtado	2
Pineda–Marciano	0

Final
Dec 20
Soriano–Micek	1
Tan–Inck Furtado	2
3rd place match
Dec 20
Pineda–Marciano	2
Hingpit–Morada	0

=== Final standings ===
Rank	Team
1st place, gold medalist(s)	Bea Tan and Rupia Inck Furtado
2nd place, silver medalist(s)	Charo Soriano and Alexa Micek
3rd place, bronze medalist(s)	Bang Pineda and Janine Marciano
4	April Ross Hingpit and Maica Morada

== List of champions ==
Beach Volleyball Republic Champions
Season	Leg	Women's	Men's	Ref.
2015	King and Queen of the Sands	Bea Tan–Jade Becaldo	n/a	
2015	Christmas Open	Bea Tan–Rupia Inck Furtado	n/a	
2016	Cabugao, Ilocos Sur	Jovelyn Gonzaga–Nerissa Bautista	n/a	
2016	San Juan, La Union	Charo Soriano–Alexa Micek	n/a	
2016	Anguib, Cagayan	Charo Soriano–Alexa Micek	n/a	
2016	Lakawon Island, Negros Occidental	Bea Tan–Fiola Ceballos	n/a	
2016	Clark, Pampanga	Grethcel Soltones–Alyssa Eroa	n/a	
2016	Bayawan, Negros Oriental	Charo Soriano–Alexa Micek	n/a	
2016	National Championships; Sands, SM By the Bay, Pasay	Bea Tan–Fiola Ceballos	n/a	
2016	Invitational; Santa Ana, Cagayan	Mimi Amaral–Bruna Figueredo	n/a	
2017	Metro Manila; Sands, SM By the Bay, Pasay	Keiko Urata–Chiyo Suzuki	Jeremiah Barrica–Kevin Hadlocon	
2017	Currimao, Ilocos Norte	Sisi Rondina–Cecilia Bangad (Collegiate Bracket-A)	Mohd Aizzzat Zokri–Raja Nazmi (Collegiate Bracket-A)	
2017	Currimao, Ilocos Norte	Floremel Rodriguez–Theres Ramas (Collegiate Bracket-B)	Jeremiah Barrica–Kevin Hadlocon (Collegiate Bracket-B)	
2017	Currimao, Ilocos Norte	n/a	Giovanni Musillo–Brian Nordberg (Open Bracket-A)	
2017	Currimao, Ilocos Norte	n/a	Jade Becaldo–Rommel Pepito (Open Bracket-B)	
2017	Moalboal, Cebu	Erjane Magdato–Alexa Polidario	Jade Becaldo–Rommel Pepito	
2017	National championships Anguib Beach, Santa Ana, Cagayan	Lourdilyn Catubag–Karen Quilario	Jade Becaldo–Rommel Pepito	
2018	Ilocos Sur	Judy Caballejo–Coyah Abanto	Henry Pecaña–KR Guzman	
2018	El Nido, Palawan	Charo Soriano–Bea Tan	KR Guzman–Ian Yee	
2018	Dumaguete	Alexa Polidario–Erjane Magdato	KR Guzman–Krung Arbasto	
2018	December Open; Sands, SM By the Bay, Pasay	Dzi Gervacio–Bea Tan	Ranran Abdilla–Jessie Lopez	
2019	Santa Fe, Cebu	Bea Tan–Dij Rodriguez	Ranran Abdilla–Jessie Lopez	
2021	Santa Ana, Cagayan (1st leg)	Sisi Rondina–Bernadeth Pons	Krung Arbasto–Jude Garcia	
2021	Santa Ana, Cagayan (2nd leg)	Sisi Rondina–Bernadeth Pons	Krung Arbasto–Jude Garcia	
2023	San Juan, Batangas	Gen Eslapor–Roma Joy Doromal	Krung Arbasto–Rancel Varga	
2023	Candon, Ilocos Sur	Kly Orillaneda–Kathrina Epa	Ranran Abdilla–Rancel Varga	
2023	Sipalay, Negros Occidental	Honey Grace Cordero–Roma Joy Doromal	Ranran Abdilla–Rancel Varga	

== See also ==
- Perlas Spikers
- Volleyball in the Philippines
