= Meralco Power Spikers =

Philippine women's volleyball team

- Full name: Meralco Power Spikers
- Short name: Meralco
- Nickname: Power Spikers
- Founded: 2013
- Dissolved: 2016
- Captain: SVL: Stephanie Mercado (DLSU); PSL: Charleen Abigail Cruz (DLSU)
- League: Shakey's V-League, Philippine Superliga
- SVL 12th Open 2015 PSL Grand Prix: 4th place 5th place
- Website: Club home page

Uniforms
Home	Away

The Meralco Power Spikers were a women's volleyball team in the Philippines owned by Meralco. The team was established in 2013 and originally competed in the Shakey's V-League (SVL) before moving to the Philippine Super Liga (PSL) in 2015.

== Final roster ==
For the 2015 PSL Grand Prix Conference:

MERALCO Power Spikers
Number	Player	Position	Height	Birth date	School
1	(Philippines) Maria Mikaela Esperanza	Setter	5'5"	50 kg	November 8, 1993 (age 32)
3	(Philippines) Mika Aereen Reyes	Middle Hitter	5'11"	59 kg	June 21, 1994 (age 31)
4	(Philippines) Stephanie Mercado	Outside Hitter	5'8"	July 1, 1989 (age 36)	De La Salle University
5	(Philippines) Dawn Nicole Macandili	Libero	5'3"	May 31, 1996 (age 29)	De La Salle University
6	(United States) Christina Alessi	Outside Hitter	6'2"	October 4, 1991 (age 34)	
9	(Philippines) Kim Fajardo	Setter	5'8"	September 30, 1993 (age 32)	De La Salle University
10	(Philippines) Mary Joy Baron	Middle Hitter	5'11"	December 10, 1995 (age 29)	De La Salle University
11	(Philippines) Cha Cruz (c)	Outside Hitter	5'8"	May 11, 1988 (age 37)	De La Salle University
12	(Philippines) Rochelle Sison	Libero	4'11"	October 10, 1992 (age 33)	
13	(Estonia) Liis Kullerkann	Outside Hitter	6'3"	May 2, 1991 (age 34)	
14	(Philippines) Carol Ann Cerveza	Opposite	5'8"	June 12, 1994 (age 31)	
15	(Philippines) Kim Kianna Dy	Middle Hitter	5'10"	July 26, 1995 (age 30)	De La Salle University
18	(Philippines) Cydthealee Demecillo	Outside Hitter		December 2, 1993 (age 31)	De La Salle University
19	(Philippines) Celine Anne Hernandez	Middle Blocker	5'10"	August 9, 1988 (age 37)	

Coaching staff

- Head coach:
  (Philippines) Ramil de Jesus
- Assistant coach(s):
  (Philippines) Noel Orcullo
  (Philippines) Benson Bocboc
  (Philippines) Brian Esquibel

Team Staff

- Team Manager:
  (Philippines) Ferdinand Geluz
- Team Utility:

Medical Staff

- Team Physician:
  (Philippines) Grace Salimbao
- Physical Therapist:
  (Philippines) Carissa Gotis

== Honors ==
=== Team ===
==== Premier Volleyball League ====
Season	Conference	Title	Source
Season 10	Open Conference	5th place	
Season 11	Open Conference	(Did not compete)	
Season 11	Reinforced Open Conference	4th place	
Season 12	Open Conference	4th place	
Season 12	Reinforced Open Conference	(Did not compete)	

==== Philippine Superliga ====
Year	Tournament	Title	Source
2015	Beach Challenge Cup	5th place	
2015	Grand Prix	5th place	

==== MVP Olympics ====
Season	Conference	Title	Source
2016	MVP Olympics	1st place	

=== Individual ===
==== Shakey's V-League ====
Season	Conference	Award	Name
Season 11 (2014)	Reinforced Open	Best Blocker	Abigail Maraño
Season 12 (2015)	Open Conference	Best Libero	Jennylyn Reyes

== Team captains ==
=== Shakey's V-League ===
Season	Number	Player
2013	10	Maureen Penetrante-Ouano
2014	10	Maureen Penetrante-Ouano
2015	4	Stephanie Mercado

=== Philippine Superliga ===
Season	Number	Player
2015	11	Charleen Abigail Cruz

== See also ==
- Meralco Bolts
- F.C. Meralco Manila
- Meralco Reddy Kilowatts
