= Bojana Todorović =

Serbian-American volleyball player (born 1991)

Personal information
- Nationality: Serbian / American
- Born: October 28, 1991 (age 35); Belgrade, Serbia
- Hometown: Irvine, California
- Height: 183 cm (6 ft 0 in)
- Weight: 70 kg (150 lb)
- Spike: 295 cm (116 in)
- Block: 295 cm (116 in)
- Education: University of California, Los Angeles

Volleyball information
- Position: Outside hitter

Career
Years	Teams
2014-2015	CEP Poitiers Saint-Benoît
2015	Philips Gold Lady Slammers
2016	Valencianas de Juncos
2016	Changas de Naranjito

Bojana Todorović, also known as Bo Todorovic (born 28 October 1991) is a Serbian-American volleyball player.

Todorović won the 2011 NCAA Division I competition with University of California Bruins. She was fourth in the 2013 FIVB U23 World Championship. With the Filipino club Philips Gold Lady Slammers she won the bronze medal in the 2015 Philippine Super Liga Grand Prix conference and the Second Best Outside Spiker individual award.

== Personal life ==
Todorović was born on October 28, 1991, in Belgrade. She recalled her childhood influenced by the NATO bombing of Yugoslavia during the Kosovo War and the sirens she used to hear in the playground and spending quality family time while taking shelter underground. Her family moved to Long Beach, California, when she was nine years old. Her parents are Dusan and Maja Todorović, who played club volleyball and introduced her to the sport. She has an older brother named Dimitrije. She is 183 cm (6 ft 0 in) tall 70 kilograms (150 lb). She speaks Serbian, English and Spanish.

She graduated from University High School (Irvine, California) and went to University of California, Los Angeles graduating in Economics. She enrolled herself in the California State University, Long Beach graduate school to pursue a Master's degree in Sport management and Eastern European History. Todorović has been praised for having a beautiful look while playing in France and the Philippines. As of August 2020, Todorović had reportedly been dating Kirby Ruiz. Todorović is also a professional model.

== Career ==
Todorović practiced karate for a year before shes started with volleyball at the age of seven in Belgrade. Playing with University High School, Todorović was All-City every year, including CIF championship in her first year, All-City Most Valuable Player in her last year and a Fab 50 selection from Volleyball Magazine. With the Laguna Beach club, she won the third place in the 2007 and 2009 Junior National Championship and was selected among the All-Tournament Team in 2008 and 2009.

She spent her playing career in college for the University of California Bruins as an outside spiker in her first two years, then defensive specialist and libero in her final year and spent one year playing sand volleyball. She was part of the 2011 UCLA Bruins champion team during the 2011 NCAA Division I competition. In her rookie year, she was part of the 2009 All-Pac-10 Freshman team. She won the 2010 USAV IDQ #3 beach volleyball tournament, partnering Tara Roenicke earning a spont in the United States U19 Beach Volleyball Team, but was unable to compete with the team because she was not American citizen yet.

She was part of the United States national team that ranked fourth in the 2013 FIVB U23 World Championship. In 2014, she played another sand volleyball season, this time with the Long Beach State 49ers seeded No.1, reaching the National Championships round of 16. She signed with the French club CEP Poitiers Saint-Benoît located in the city of Poitiers from the second division league, after turning down proposals from Germany and Switzerland to experience a new culture and language.

=== 2015 ===
Todorović helped her club to avoid the relegation in the finals playoff as the team main player. Her coach wanted to keep her but she confirmed that she would return to the United States and the coach asked the club to found him a new "Bojana Todorović".

In October 2015, she accepted the offer to join the Philips Gold Lady Slammers to play the 2015 PSL Grand Prix Conference. and described her stay as a great experience with her teammates and the fans. She took time to learn some Filipino language to improve the communication with her teammates. Scoring 38 points she helped her club to finish the classification round in first place after beating the champion and favorite team Foton. Besides the 31 points scored by Todorović in the semifinal match, again versus Foton, her team lost 2–3 admitting that she could do better for being a competitive person. Philips Gold finally claimed the third place in the tournament and Todorović won the Second Best Outside Spiker. Minutes after the third place game against Cignal HD Spikers on November 21, 2015, Todorovic announced that she would retire from the sport after her planned season in the Puerto Rican volleyball league to complete her master's degree in Sports Management in the California State University, Long Beach.

=== 2016 ===
Todorović signed for the Puerto Rican club Valencianas de Juncos for the 2016 season. But she was transferred to Changas de Naranjito in early march to replace Emily Brown. Even though she helped her team to ascend to the seventh place, she later suffered an injury and could not play in the rest of the season.

== Clubs ==
- (France) CEP Poitiers Saint-Benoît (2014–2015)
- (Philippines) Philips Gold Lady Slammers (2015)
- (Puerto Rico) Valencianas de Juncos (2016)
- (Puerto Rico) Changas de Naranjito (2016)
