= Liis Kullerkann =

Estonian volleyball player

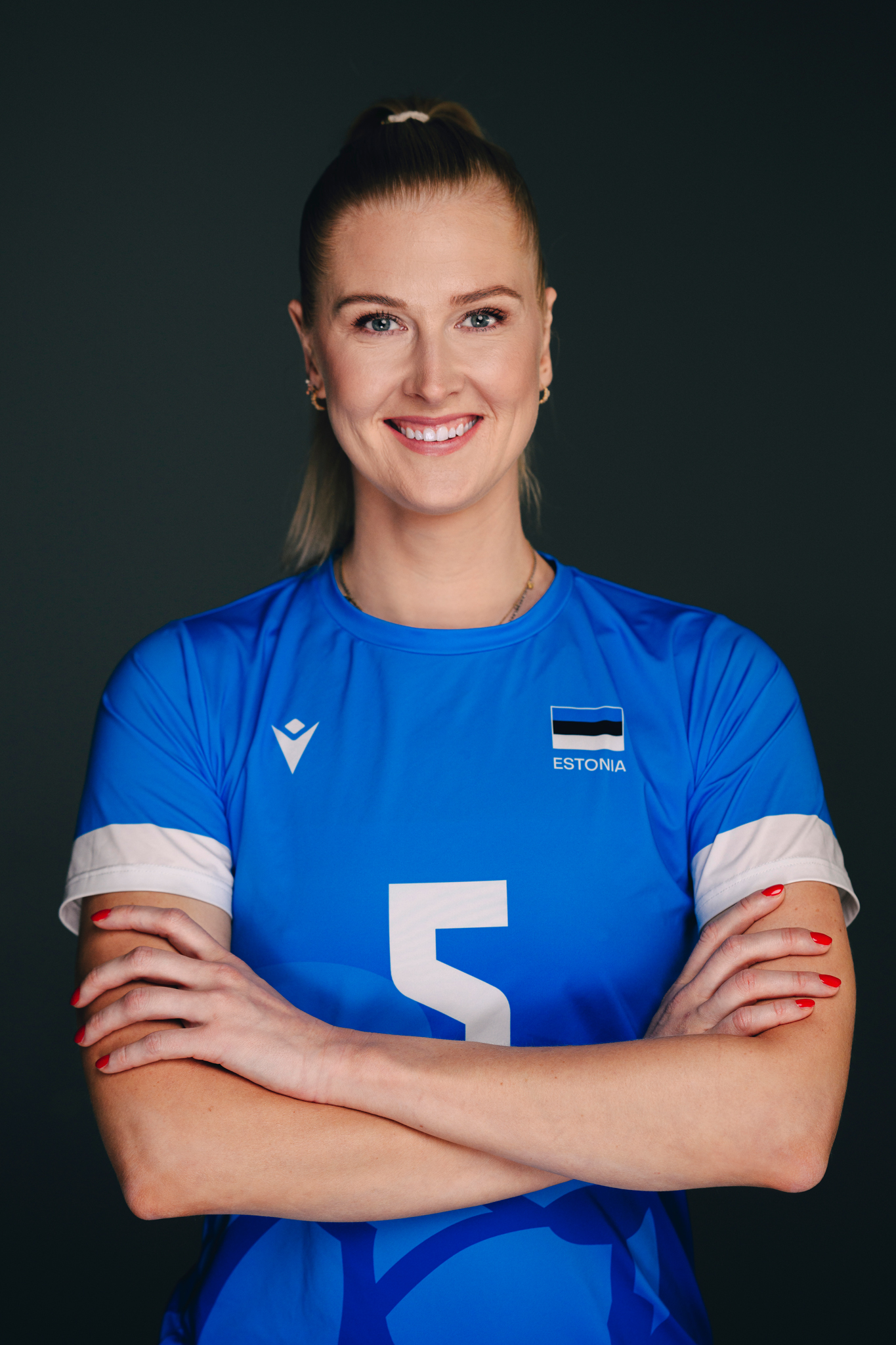

Personal information
- Born: 2 May 1991 (age 35); Tallinn, Estonia
- Height: 1.87 m (6 ft 2 in)
- Weight: 74 kg (163 lb)
- Spike: 305 cm (120 in)
- Block: 280 cm (110 in)

Volleyball information
- Position: Middle blocker
- Current club: RC Cannes

Career
Years	Teams
2010–2013; 2013–2014; 2014–2016; 2020–2021; 2021–2023	Ohio University; Duquesne University; Clubs in Estonia (early career); Le Cannet; RC Cannes

National team
2013–	Estonia
Honours
Women's volleyball
Representing Estonia
European Championship

Liis Kullerkann (also known as Liis Kiviloo; born 2 May 1991) is an Estonian professional volleyball player, who plays as a middle blocker. She has represented the Estonia women's national volleyball team at multiple major tournaments and has built a diverse club career across Europe.

She capped for Estonia women's national volleyball team more than 110 times.

== Early life and education ==
Born in Tallinn, Kullerkann grew up in Keila and began playing volleyball at age 15, after a childhood focused on athletics, especially high jump.

== Collegiate and club career ==
Her talent earned her a scholarship to play in the U.S., where she excelling at Ohio University and later Duquesne University as an outside hitter.

After completing her studies, Kullerkann began a professional career in Europe. In 2020, she signed with French Ligue A club Le Cannet, becoming a key figure in both the domestic league and the Estonian national team setup.

== National team ==
Kullerkann has been a long-time member of the Estonian women’s national volleyball team since around 2013, earning over 100 caps across European competition cycles.

She played in Estonia’s historic first qualification to EuroVolley in 2019 and was part of the squad again in 2023.

== Activism and advocacy ==
Off-court, Kullerkann is known for her environmental advocacy and leadership. After earning an MBA in sustainability, she has used her platform to promote eco-conscious practices in sport and beyond.

== Other notable events ==
During the COVID-19 pandemic, Kullerkann shared her experience of being unexpectedly quarantined in France while preparing to rejoin her club, highlighting both logistical and emotional challenges for athletes abroad.

== Personal life ==
She is known to be multilingual and holds an international business bachelor’s degree along with an MBA in sustainability.
