= Shopinas.com Lady Clickers =

- Full name: Shopinas.com Lady Clickers
- Short name: Shopinas.com
- Nickname: Lady Clickers
- Founded: 2015
- Dissolved: 2015
- Manager: Sheila Lina
- Captain: Michelle Laborte (USLS)
- League: Philippine Super Liga
- 2015 All-Filipino: Runner-up
- Website: Club home page

Uniforms
Home	Away

The Shopinas.com Lady Clickers were a women's volleyball team in the Philippines owned by Air21 Global Inc., led by the Lina Group. The team competed in the Philippine Super Liga (PSL) after it acquired the 2014 roster of the Generika Lifesavers. The team took part in just one conference: the 2015 All-Filipino Conference.

== Roster ==
For the 2015 PSL All-Filipino Conference:

Shopinas.com
No.	Last name	First name	Position	Ht.	Wt.	College	Birth Date
2	Cheng	Djanel Welch	Setter	1.65 m (5 ft 5 in)	55 kg	CSB	August 28, 1994 (age 31)
4	Mercado	Stephanie	Outside Hitter	1.70 m (5 ft 7 in)	58 kg	DLSU	July 1, 1989 (age 36)
5	General	Fatima Bia	Libero	1.65 m (5 ft 5 in)	55 kg	NU	August 27, 1995 (age 30)
6	Guevara	Faye Janelle	Middle Hitter	1.74 m (5 ft 8 1/2 in)	58 kg	AdU	July 9, 1992 (age 33)
7	Mandapat	Rizza Jane	Opposite Hitter	1.74 m (5 ft 8 1/2 in)	58 kg	NU	February 28, 1994 (age 31)
8	Hingpit	April Rose	Setter	1.65 m (5 ft 5 in)	56 kg	USLS	January 11, 1989 (age 36)
9	Tiu	Jeushl Wensh	Open Hitter	1.72 m (5 ft 7 1/2 in)	59 kg	DLSU	April 10, 1991 (age 34)
10	Angustia	Arianna May	Middle Hitter	1.78 m (5 ft 10 in)	59 kg	EAC	April 28, 1992 (age 33)
11	Cruz	Charleen Abigail	Opposite/Outside Hitter	1.73 m (5 ft 8 in)	60 kg	DLSU	May 11, 1988 (age 37)
12	Sison	Rochelle	Libero	1.50 m (4 ft 11 in)	46 kg	DLSU	October 10, 1992 (age 33)
14	Tan	Alexandra Denice	Opposite Hitter	1.75 m (5 ft 9 in)	57 kg	DLSU	October 25, 1993 (age 32)
15	Dy	Kim Kianna	Middle Hitter	1.78 m (5 ft 10 in)	57 kg	DLSU	July 26, 1995 (age 30)
16	Eguia	Divine	Outside Hitter	1.72 m (5 ft 7 1/2 in)	59 kg	Lyceum-Laguna	July 10, 1993 (age 32)
17	Laborte (c)	Michelle	Opposite/Middle Hitter	1.74 m (5 ft 8 1/2 in)	65 kg	USLS	June 14, 1980 (age 45)

Coaching staff

- Head coach:
  (Philippines) Ramil de Jesus
- Assistant coach(s):
  (Philippines) Noel Orcullo
  (Philippines) Benson Bocboc

Team staff

- Team manager:
  (Philippines) Jay Ferrer
- Team Utility:

Medical Staff

- Team Physician:
  (Philippines) Filma Herbosa
- Physical Therapist:
  (Philippines) Grace Salimbao

== Honors ==
=== Team ===
Season	Conference	Title	Source
2015	All-Filipino	Runner-up	

=== Individual ===
Season	Conference	Award	Name
2015	All-Filipino	1st Best Outside Spiker	Charleen Abigail Cruz

== See also ==
- Air21 Express (originally known as Shopinas.com Clickers) - former PBA team
- F2 Logistics Cargo Movers
