= Cha Cruz-Behag =

Filipino volleyball player

Personal information
- Full name: Charleen Abigaile Ramos Cruz
- Nationality: Filipino
- Born: May 11, 1988 (age 38)
- Hometown: Valenzuela, Philippines
- Height: 1.72 m (5 ft 8 in)
- Weight: 60 kg (132 lb)
- Education: De La Salle University

Volleyball information
- Position: Outside hitter/open hitter
- Current club: F2 Logistics Cargo Movers
- Number: 11

Career
Years	Teams
2014	AirAsia Flying Spikers
2014	Generika Lifesavers
2015	Shopinas.com Lady Clickers
2015	Meralco Power Spikers
2015	Cignal HD Spikers
2016–2023	F2 Logistics Cargo Movers

Charleen Abigaile "Cha" Ramos Cruz-Behag (born May 11, 1988) is a Filipino professional volleyball player and an educator. She was a two-time University Athletic Association of the Philippines's (UAAP) Finals Most Valuable Player and was part of the De La Salle University Lady Spikers' four UAAP championships. She is known for her versatility in volleyball, earning her the moniker "Ms. Everything".

In July 2024, she was tapped as assistant coach for the Petro Gazz Angels.

== Personal life ==
Cruz was born on May 11, 1988. She studied in the St. Louis College of Valenzuela high school from 2003 to 2006 and completed her Bachelor's in Psychology at De La Salle University. As of 2012, she was pursuing her Master's degree in Special Education. She is the older sister of volleyball players Camille Cruz and Cienne Cruz.

Cruz married pilot Rey Behag on February 28, 2018, in Tagaytay. In October 2019, she gave birth to her son, Leon Sol.

== Career ==
Cruz is known for her versatility in playing volleyball. Over her career, she has played every position except libero and has embraced the 7th woman role for the DLSU Lady Spikers. This all-around athleticism and her ability to transition from setter to all spiking positions earned her the moniker "Miss Everything". However, she completed playing the final position of libero during the Battle of the Rivals on July 16, 2017.

Cruz began playing volleyball when she was in 6th grade. She took a break in the succeeding years but picked it up again during high school. Later, she was recruited by Coach Ramil De Jesus for the DLSU Lady Spikers varsity team and played for the team from 2005 to 2012.

Cruz continued playing for three years in her collegiate career. Midway during her UAAP rookie year (Season 68, 2005–2006) she sustained a stress fracture in her left ankle which forced her to sit out the remaining games of the season. In the following UAAP season (Season 69, 2006–07), all DLSU varsity teams were suspended from the athletic association as a consequence of its men's basketball team's violation of a UAAP rule. In UAAP Season 70 (2007–08), Cruz-Behag was barred from playing for the team as she failed to meet the academic requirements.

In 2008, Cruz returned to the team, this time playing as an open spiker and middle blocker. The DLSU Lady Spikers only dropped two matches in UAAP Season 71 (2008–2009), winning the championship title over the Far Eastern Lady Tamaraws. However, in Season 72 (2009–10), the DLSU Lady Spikers were dethroned by the University of Santo Tomas (UST) Lady Tigers and finished as runner-up.

In her last two UAAP seasons, 73 (2010–11) and 74 (2011–12), Cruz was named team captain for the DLSU Lady Spikers. In both seasons, the team won the championships and Cruz was awarded the UAAP Finals Most Valuable Player for both seasons. Eventually, the back-to-back championships turned into a 3-peat as the DLSU Lady Spikers again won the UAAP Women's Volleyball championship in Season 75.

When she finished playing for UAAP, Cruz took a break from playing volleyball to focus on her teaching career. She is currently completing her master's degree in education major in special education at De La Salle University.

After a two-year hiatus, Cruz made a comeback via the now defunct AirAsia Flying Spikers in 2014, reuniting with Coach Ramil de Jesus and other DLSU Lady Spikers. She then became the team captain of the F2 Logistics Cargo Movers in the Philippine Super Liga.

== Clubs ==
- (Philippines) AirAsia Flying Spikers (2014)
- (Philippines) Generika Lifesavers (2014)
- (Philippines) Shopinas.com Lady Clickers (2015)
- (Philippines) Meralco Power Spikers (2015)
- (Philippines) Cignal HD Spikers (2015)
- (Philippines) F2 Logistics Cargo Movers (2016–2023)

== Awards (Partial list) ==
=== Individuals ===
- UAAP Season 73 "Finals Most Valuable Player"
- UAAP Season 74 "Finals Most Valuable Player"
- 2015 Philippine Superliga All-Filipino Conference "1st Best Outside Spiker"

=== Collegiate ===
- UAAP Season 68 volleyball tournaments - Champions, with DLSU Lady Spikers
- UAAP Season 71 volleyball tournaments - Champions, with DLSU Lady Spikers
- UAAP Season 72 volleyball tournaments - Silver medal, with DLSU Lady Spikers
- UAAP Season 73 volleyball tournaments - Champions, with DLSU Lady Spikers
- UAAP Season 74 volleyball tournaments - Champions, with DLSU Lady Spikers

=== Clubs ===
- 2014 PSL Grand Prix Conference - Silver medal, with Generika LifeSavers (now Generika-Ayala Lifesavers)
- 2015 PSL All-Filipino Conference - Silver medal, with Shopinas.com Lady Clickers
- 2016 PSL Invitational Cup - Bronze medal, with F2 Logistics Cargo Movers
- 2016 PSL All-Filipino Conference - Champions, with F2 Logistics Cargo Movers
- 2016 PSL Grand Prix Conference - Bronze medal, with F2 Logistics Cargo Movers
- 2017 PSL All-Filipino Conference - Silver medal, with F2 Logistics Cargo Movers
- 2017 PSL Grand Prix Conference - Champions, with F2 Logistics Cargo Movers
- 2018 PSL Grand Prix Conference - Silver medal, with F2 Logistics Cargo Movers
- 2018 PSL Invitational Cup - Champions, with F2 Logistics Cargo Movers
- 2018 PSL All-Filipino Conference - Silver medal, with F2 Logistics Cargo Movers

=== Beach Volleyball ===
- 2015 Nestea Fantasy Beach Volleyball, Champions, with Light Blue Team composed of Cruz, Michele Gumabao, Rachel Anne Daquis, and Gretchen Ho

== Recognition ==
- 2015, FHM Philippines 100 Sexiest Woman, ranked No. 98
- 2015 DLSAA Lasallian Sports Achievement Award
- 2015 season of the Philippine Super Liga's brand ambassador
