= Pocari Sweat Lady Warriors =

Former Philippine professional women's volleyball team

- Short name: Pocari Sweat
- Nickname: Lady Warriors
- Founded: 2014
- Dissolved: 2019
- League: Philippine Super Liga (2014–2016); Premier Volleyball League (2018–2019)
- Championships: Premier Volleyball League: 1 (2017 Reinforced); Shakey's V-League: 2 (2016, 2016)

Uniforms
Home	Away

The Pocari Sweat Lady Warriors were a women's volleyball team in the Philippines owned by Federated Distributors, Inc., the distributors of Pocari Sweat in the country. The team was established in 2014 as a member of the Philippine Super Liga (PSL). The team originally took on the name Mane 'n Tail Lady Stallions before renaming to the Philips Gold Lady Slammers in 2015.

In 2016, the team moved to the Shakey's V-League/Premier Volleyball League and subsequently renamed to their most recent moniker.

== History ==
The Pocari Sweat Lady Warriors debuted in the Philippine Superliga (PSL) in 2014 as the original Mane 'n Tail Lady Stallions. The following season, the team changed its name to the Philips Gold Lady Slammers, while a new team assumed the Mane 'n Tail name.

On April 4, 2016, the team officially announced it will join the Shakey's V-League and play as the Pocari Sweat Lady Warriors.

On July 18, 2016, the Lady Warriors won the Shakey's V-League 13th Season Open Conference championship, beating the Philippine Air Force Jet Spikers in a best-of-three finals series. This was the team's first title.

On June 15, 2017, the Lady Warriors won the Premier Volleyball League 1st Season Reinforced Open Conference Women's Division Champions, beating the BaliPure Purest Water Defenders in a best-of-three finals series. This was the team's third and final title.

== Name changes ==
Philips Gold Lady Slammers logo (2015)

Mane 'n Tail Lady Stallions (2014, Philippine Superliga)

Philips Gold Lady Slammers (2015, Philippine Superliga)

Pocari Sweat Lady Warriors (2016–2018, Premier Volleyball League)

== Final roster ==
For the 2018 Premier Volleyball League Open Conference:

Pocari Sweat – Air Force Lady Warriors
No.	Player	Position	Height	Birth date
1	(Philippines) Jozza Mae Cabalsa	Outside hitter		
2	(Philippines) Mary Ann Balmaceda	Libero	1.58 m (5 ft 2 in)	April 26, 1993 (age 33)
3	(Philippines) Jeanette Panaga	Middle blocker	1.82 m (6 ft 0 in)	July 25, 1994 (age 32)
4	(Philippines) Iari Yongco	Opposite hitter	1.82 m (6 ft 0 in)	September 2, 1990 (age 36)
6	(Philippines) May Ann Pantino	Outside hitter	1.73 m (5 ft 8 in)	May 18, 1986 (age 40)
7	(Philippines) Wendy Anne Semana	Setter	1.62 m (5 ft 4 in)	February 15, 1986 (age 40)
8	(Philippines) Gena Keeshia Andaya	Setter	1.62 m (5 ft 4 in)	October 5, 1991 (age 34)
9	(Philippines) Elaine Kasilag	Outside hitter	1.78 m (5 ft 10 in)	August 15, 1994 (age 32)
11	(Philippines) Jellie Tempiatura	Libero	1.58 m (5 ft 2 in)	
12	(Philippines) Joy Gazelle Cases	Outside hitter	1.68 m (5 ft 6 in)	December 29, 1988 (age 37)
13	(Philippines) Dell Palomata	Middle blocker	1.91 m (6 ft 3 in)	November 1, 1995 (age 30)
16	(Philippines) Angel Mae Antipuesto	Middle blocker	1.78 m (5 ft 10 in)	May 2, 1993 (age 33)
18	(Philippines) Myla Pablo (c)	Outside hitter	1.78 m (5 ft 10 in)	December 9, 1994 (age 31)

Coaching staff

- Head Coach:
  (Philippines) MSgt. Jasper Jimenez
- Assistant Coach:
  (Philippines) SSgt.Ray Acojedo

Team Staff

- Team Manager:
  (Philippines) Atty. Ken Mirasol
- Team Utility:

Medical Staff

- Team Physician:
  (Philippines) Maricel Ty
- Physical Therapist:
  (Philippines) Gorby Sanco

== Honors ==
=== Team ===
Premier V-League:

Season	Conference	Title	Source
2016 (Note: The league was then called Shakey's V-League.)	Open	Champion	
2016	Reinforced	Champion	
2017	Reinforced	Champion	
2017	Open	Runner-up	
2018	Reinforced	4th place	
2018	Open	5th place	

Philippine Superliga

Philippine SuperLiga:

Season	Conference	Title	Source
2014	Grand Prix	6th place	
2015	All-Filipino	3rd Place	
2015	Beach Challenge Cup	8th place	
2015	Grand Prix	3rd place	
2016	Invitational	(did not compete)	

Others

Others:

Year	Tournament	Title	Source
2015	Fit To Hit: Philippine Beach Volleyball Invitational	7th place	

=== Individual ===
Premier Volleyball League

Season	Conference	Award	Name
2016	Open		
2016	Open	Most Valuable Player (Finals)	Myla Pablo
2016	Open	2nd Best Outside Spiker	Myla Pablo
2016	Open	Best Opposite Spiker	Michele Gumabao
2016	Open	Best Libero	Melissa Gohing
2016	Reinforced Open		
2016	Reinforced Open	Most Valuable Player (Finals)	Michele Gumabao
2016	Reinforced Open	Best Opposite Spiker	Michele Gumabao
2016	Reinforced Open	Best Setter	Iris Janelle Tolenada
2016	Reinforced Open	Best Foreign Guest Player	(United States) Breanna Lee Mackie
2017	Reinforced Open		
2017	Reinforced Open	Most Valuable Player (Finals)	Myla Pablo
2017	Reinforced Open	Best Import (Finals)	(United States) Michelle Strizak
2017	Reinforced Open	Best Libero	Melissa Gohing
2017	Reinforced Open	2nd Best Best Middle Blocker	Jeanette Panaga
2017	Open		
2017	Open	Most Valuable Player (Conference)	Myla Pablo
2017	Open	1st Best Outside Spiker	Myla Pablo
2017	Open	1st Best Best Middle Blocker	Jeanette Panaga
2017	Open	Best Libero	Melissa Gohing
2018	Reinforced		
2018	Reinforced	Most Valuable Player (Conference)	Myla Pablo
2018	Reinforced	2nd Best Outside Spiker	Myla Pablo
2018	Reinforced	1st Best Best Middle Blocker	Jeanette Panaga

Philippine SuperLiga

Philippine SuperLiga:

Season	Conference	Award	Name
2015	All-Filipino		
2015	All-Filipino	Best Opposite Spiker	Michele Gumabao
2015	All-Filipino	Best Setter	Iris Tolenada
2015	Grand Prix		
2015	Grand Prix	2nd Best Outside Spiker	(United States) Bojana Todorovic
2015	Grand Prix	1st Best Middle Blocker	(United States) Alexis Olgard
2015	Grand Prix	1st Best Opposite Spiker	Michele Gumabao

== Team captains ==
- (United States) Kaylee Manns (2014)
- (Philippines) Jill Gustilo (2015)
- (Philippines) Michele Gumabao (2015 – 2016)
- (Philippines) Gyzelle Sy (2017)
- (Philippines) Myla Pablo (2018)

== Imports ==
Premier Volleyball League/Shakey's V-League

Season	Number	Player	Country
2016	4	Andrea Kay Kacsits	United States
2016	6	Breanna Lee Mackie	United States
2017	4	Michelle Strizak	United States
2017	13	Krystal Rivers (Note: Replaced injured Bosnian guest player Edina Selimovic, due to a right hamstring injury at the close of the preliminary round.)	United States
2017	14	Edina Selimovic	Bosnia and Herzegovina
2018	2	Maddie Palmer	United States
2018	10	Arielle Love	United States

Philippine SuperLiga

Season	Number	Player	Country
2014	2	Kaylee Manns	United States
2014	16	Kristy Jaeckel	United States
2015	1	Alexis Olgard	United States
2015	10	Bojana Todorović	United States

== Coaches ==
- (Philippines) Francis Vicente (2014 – 2015)
- (Philippines) Rommel John Abella (2016 – 2017)
- (Philippines) Sgt. Rico de Guzman (PA) (2017)
