= Alexa Micek =

Filipino American volleyball player (born 1991)

Personal information
- Full name: Alexa Micek
- Nationality: American
- Born: October 28, 1991 (age 35)
- Hometown: Oxnard, California, U.S.
- Height: 5 ft 9 in (1.76 m)
- Spike: 110 in (280 cm)
- Block: 110 in (270 cm)

Volleyball information
- Position: Opposite spiker
- Current club: Kia Forte
- Number: 8

Career
Years	Teams
2015	Petron Blaze Spikers
2015-2016	Kia Forte
- Last updated: October 2016

Alexa Micek (born October 28, 1991) is a Filipino American volleyball athlete who played for Petron Blaze Spikers in the Philippine Super Liga and Kia Forte in the Shakey's V-League.

== Personal life ==
She graduated from North Carolina State University, where she took up civil engineering for three seasons.

She is the daughter of Matt Micek.

== Career ==
Micek studied at Oak Park High School, being twice named first team All Tri-Valley League and honored as team Most Valuable Player in 2007 and 2008. She went to Los Angeles Pierce College where she led the Western Conference in digs with 606.

She played the 2015 Spike For Peace Women’s International Beach Volleyball and the Beach Volleyball Republic Christmas Open at the SM Sands by the Bay, December 19–20, 2015, both with Charo Soriano. She was the 2015 sixth overall and first round draft pick of the Petron Blaze Spikers in the Philippine Super Liga.

Micek played with Petron Sprint 4T in the 2015 PSL Beach Volleyball Challenge Cup and later she returned to indoor with Kia Forte for the Shakey's V-League 12th Season Reinforced Open Conference.

== Clubs ==
- (Philippines) Petron Blaze Spikers (2015)
- (Philippines) Kia Forte (2015–2016)

== Awards ==
=== Beach Volleyball ===
- Silver Medal – Beach Volleyball Republic Christmas Open (2015)
