= Mane 'n Tail Lady Stallions (2015) =

Former professional volleyball team in the Philippine Super Liga

Mane ‘n Tail Lady Stallions
- Short name: Mane ‘n Tail
- Founded: 2015
- Dissolved: 2015
- Captain: Jill Gustilo (AdU)
- League: Philippine Super Liga
- 2015 All-Filipino: 6th place
- Website: Club home page

Uniforms
Home	Away

The Mane 'n Tail Lady Stallions were a women's volleyball team in the Philippines owned by Federated Distributors Inc. The team competed in the Philippine Super Liga (PSL) after took on the name after the 2014 team of the same name was renamed to the Philips Gold Lady Slammers in 2015. The team only took part in one conference: the 2015 All-Filipino Conference

== Final roster ==
For the 2015 PSL All-Filipino Conference:

Mane 'n Tail Lady Stallions
No.	Last Name	First Name	Position	Ht.	Wt.	College	Birth Date
2	Diaz	Norie Jane	Libero	1.65 m (5 ft 5 in)	57 kg	UPHSD	October 13, 1992 (age 33)
4	Argarin	Arianne Mei	Setter	1.62 m (5 ft 4 in)	60 kg	UPHSD	June 26, 1992 (age 33)
5	Veronas	Therese Maureen	Opposite/Outside Hitter	1.80 m (5 ft 11 in)	60 kg	CSB	March 24, 1994 (age 31)
6	Gustilo (c)	Jill	Outside Hitter	1.67 m (5 ft 5 1/2 in)	60 kg	AdU	February 20, 1988 (age 37)
7	Amad	Cendymie	Outside Hitter	1.67 m (5 ft 5 1/2 in)	68 kg	CPU	October 7, 1991 (age 34)
8	Gendrauli	Danika	Outside Hitter	1.72 m (5 ft 7 1/2 in)	62 kg	SWU	October 7, 1991 (age 34)
9	Desengano	Mariel	Setter	1.67 m (5 ft 5 1/2 in)	58 kg	DLSU-D	September 6, 1993 (age 32)
11	Mabbayad	Lilet	Middle Hitter	1.75 m (5 ft 9 in)	67 kg	UST	September 16, 1987 (age 38)
12	Perez	Angelica Charisse	Middle Hitter	1.70 m (5 ft 7 in)	64 kg	UE	October 2, 1986 (age 39)
14	Basco	Khristine		1.77 m (5 ft 9 1/2 in)	65 kg	Letran	December 29, 1981 (age 43)
15	Tubino	Honey Royse	Middle Hitter	1.77 m (5 ft 9 1/2 in)	72 kg	UPHSD	January 12, 1993 (age 32)
16	Praca	Ma. Abigail	Middle Hitter	1.70 m (5 ft 7 in)	58 kg	USJ-R	April 23, 1992 (age 33)
18	Cortel	Marleen	Libero	1.65 m (5 ft 5 in)	56 kg	AdU	October 16, 1993 (age 32)
19	Dawson	Samantha Chloe	Opposite Hitter	1.70 m (5 ft 7 in)	60 kg	FEU	October 8, 1993 (age 32)

Coaching staff

- Head coach:
  (Philippines) Rosemarie Prochina
- Assistant coach(s):
  (Philippines) Zenaida Chavez
  (Philippines) Philip Coming

Team Staff

- Team manager:
- Team Utility:

Medical Staff

- Team physician:
- Physical Therapist:
  (Philippines) Francisco dela Cruz

== Honors ==
=== Team ===
Philippine Superliga

Season	Conference	Title	Source
2015	All-Filipino	6th place	

Others

Year	Tournament	Title	Source
2015	Fit To Hit: Philippine Beach Volleyball Invitational	4th place	
