= 2018–19 Women's Volleyball Thailand League =

Thai volleyball competition season

2018 Women's Volleyball Thailand League
Tournament details
- Dates: 27 October 2018 – 17 March 2019
- Teams: 8
- Venues: 7 (in 5 host cities)
- Third place: 3BB Nakornnont
- Fourth place: Thai–Denmark Khonkaen Star

Tournament awards
- MVP: Onuma Sittirak

Tournament statistics
- Matches played: 56 (Regular seasons); 4 (Final series)

The 2018–19 Women's Volleyball Thailand League is the 14th season of the Women's Volleyball Thailand League, the top Thai professional league for women's volleyball clubs, since its establishment in 2005, also known as CP Women's Volleyball Thailand League due to the sponsorship deal with Charoen Pokphand. A total of 8 teams will compete in the league. The season will begin on 27 October 2018, and is scheduled to conclude in 2019. This season will be organized by the Thailand Volleyball Association (TVA) instead Thailand Volleyball Co., Ltd. The season started.

Supreme Chonburi are the defending champions, also the reigning Asian club champions, while the 2018 Pro Challenge champion will has entered as the promoted team from the 2018 Volleyball Pro Challenge.

== Changes from last season ==
=== Team changes ===
==== Promoted clubs ====
Promoted from the 2018 Women's Volleyball Pro Challenge

- Opart 369 (2018 Pro Challenge champion)
- Rangsit University (2018 Pro Challenge runner-up)

==== Relegated clubs ====
Relegated from the 2017–18 Women's Volleyball Thailand League

- Rangsit University
- Cosmo Chiang Rai

==== Reformed club ====
- Bangkok Glass authorize from Quint Air Force

== Clubs ==
=== Personnel and sponsorship ===
| Team | Head coach | Captain | Colors | Kit manufacturer | Main sponsor |
|---|---|---|---|---|---|
| Quint Air Force | (Thailand) Padejsuk Wannachote | (Thailand) Sutadta Chuewulim | | KELA Sport | Quint Realm |
| King-Bangkok | (Thailand) Suwat Jeerapan | (Thailand) Siriporn Suksaen | | KELA Sport | King Rice Bran Oil |
| Thai–Denmark Khonkaen Star | (Thailand) Apirat Ngammeerit | (Thailand) Pornthip Santrong | | Grand Sport | Thai-Denmark Milk |
| 3BB Nakornnont | (Thailand) Thanakit Inleang | (Thailand) Narumon Khanan | | Grand Sport Group | 3BB internet |
| Nakhon Ratchasima The Mall | (Thailand) Wanna Buakaew | (Thailand) Onuma Sittirak | | Grand Sport Group | The Mall Group |
| Opart 369 | (Thailand) Pollawat Toomanee | (Thailand) Arisa Promnok | | KELA Sport | Opart 369 |
| Rangsit University (RSU) | (Thailand) Nutthanat Deema | (Thailand) Pimpaka Rattanasirisampan | | Grand Sport Group | Rangsit University |
| Generali Supreme Chonburi-E.Tech | (Thailand) Nataphon Srisamutnak | (Thailand) Wilavan Apinyapong | | Mizuno Corporation | Supreme Distribution; Assicurazioni Generali; Eastern Technological College |

=== Managerial changes ===
- Indicate the positions in the relegation zone.

| Team | Outgoing manager | Manner of departure | Week | Table | Incoming manager |
|---|---|---|---|---|---|
| King-Bangkok | (Thailand) Rakpong Janjaroen | End of contract | Pre-season | | (Thailand) Suwat Jeerapan |
| Nakhon Ratchasima The Mall | (Thailand) Bunteung Khaopong | End of contract | Pre-season | | (Thailand) Wanna Buakaew |
| Rangsit University (RSU) | (Thailand) Sanong Kullachim | End of contract | Pre-season | | (Thailand) Nutthanat Deema |
| Thai–Denmark Khonkaen Star | (Thailand) Sunton Poeseetha | Mutual consent | Week 7 | 4 | (Thailand) Apirat Ngammeerit |

=== National team players ===
Note :
(substituted off) : players who released during second leg transfer window;
(substituted on) : players who registered during second leg transfer window;
→: players who left club after registered during first or second leg.

| Team | Leg | Player 1 | Player 2 | Player 3 |
|---|---|---|---|---|
| Thai–Denmark Khonkaen Star | 1st | Thatdao Nuekjang | | |
| Thai–Denmark Khonkaen Star | 2nd | Thatdao Nuekjang | Pornpun Guedpard (substituted on) | |
| Nakhon Ratchasima The Mall | 1st | Onuma Sittirak | Nootsara Tomkom | Malika Kanthong |
| Nakhon Ratchasima The Mall | 2nd | Onuma Sittirak | Nootsara Tomkom | Malika Kanthong |
| Generali Supreme Chonburi-E.Tech | 1st | Wilavan Apinyapong | Pleumjit Thinkaow | Piyanut Pannoy (substituted off) |
| Generali Supreme Chonburi-E.Tech | 2nd | Wilavan Apinyapong | Pleumjit Thinkaow | Ajcharaporn Kongyot (substituted on) |

National team player quotas except from regulation

- Hattaya Bamrungsuk is first time in national team with Nakhon Ratchasima The Mall.
- Pimpichaya Kokram is first time in national team with 3BB Nakornnont.
- Chitaporn Kamlangmak is first time in national team with Thai–Denmark Khonkaen Star.
- Supattra Pairoj is first time in national team with Generali Supreme Chonburi-E.Tech.
- Watchareeya Nuanjam is first time in national team with Generali Supreme Chonburi-E.Tech.
- Academic players will not including in national team player quota.

=== Foreign players ===
| AVC players. |
| CAVB players. |
| CEV players. |
| CSV players. |
| No foreign player registered. |

Note :
(substituted off) : players who released during second leg transfer window;
(substituted on) : players who registered during second leg transfer window;
→: players who left club after registered during first or second leg.

| Team | Leg | Player 1 | Player 2 |
|---|---|---|---|
| Quint Air Force | 1st | (Vietnam) Trịnh Thị Khánh | (Vietnam) Trần Thị Bích Thủy |
| Quint Air Force | 2nd | (Vietnam) Trịnh Thị Khánh | (Vietnam) Trần Thị Bích Thủy |
| Thai–Denmark Khonkaen Star | 1st | (Brazil) Thaynara Emmel Roxo (substituted off) | (Brazil) Paula Ilisandra |
| Thai–Denmark Khonkaen Star | 2nd | | (Brazil) Paula Ilisandra |
| 3BB Nakornnont | 1st | (Hong Kong) Yeung Sau-Mei | |
| 3BB Nakornnont | 2nd | (Hong Kong) Yeung Sau-Mei | (China) Zheng Yixin (substituted off) |
| Generali Supreme Chonburi-E.Tech | 1st | (Senegal) Fatou Diouck (substituted off) → | |
| Generali Supreme Chonburi-E.Tech | 2nd | (Kenya) Mercy Moim (substituted on) | (China) Wang Na (substituted on) |
| Nakhon Ratchasima | 1st | (Japan) Mai Okumura | |
| Nakhon Ratchasima | 2nd | (Japan) Mai Okumura | (Turkey) Yeliz Başa (substituted on) |

=== Transfers ===
==== First leg ====
| Name | Moving from | Moving to |
|---|---|---|
| (Brazil) Elisângela Oliveira | (Thailand) Khonkaen Star | —N/a |
| (Brazil) Lisandra Klein | (Brazil) Clube Curitibano | (Thailand) Khonkaen Star |
| (Brazil) Thaynara Emmel | (Spain) Fundacion Cajasol Juvasa | (Thailand) Khonkaen Star |
| (Greece) Anna Maria Spanou | (Thailand) Bangkok Glass | (Greece) GS Ilioupolis |
| (Hong Kong) Yeung Sau-Mei | (Thailand) Rangsit University | (Thailand) 3BB Nakornnont |
| (Japan) Mai Okumura | (Japan) JT Marvelous | (Thailand) Nakhon Ratchasima |
| (Senegal) Fatou Diouck | (Thailand) Supreme Chonburi | (South Korea) Expressway Hi-pass |
| (Thailand) Ajcharaporn Kongyot | (Thailand) Supreme Chonburi | (Indonesia) Jakarta BNI 46 |
| (Thailand) Chatchu-on Moksri | (Thailand) Nakhon Ratchasima | (Japan) PFU BlueCats |
| (Thailand) Hattaya Bamrungsuk | (Thailand) Nakhon Ratchasima | Free agent |
| (Thailand) Jutarat Montripila | (Thailand) Rangsit University | (Indonesia) Jakarta Elektrik PLN |
| (Thailand) Kaewkalaya Kamulthala | (Thailand) Khonkaen Star | (Japan) JT Marvelous |
| (Thailand) Malika Kanthong | (Thailand) Supreme Chonburi | (Thailand) Nakhon Ratchasima |
| (Thailand) Nootsara Tomkom | (Turkey) Fenerbahçe | (Thailand) Nakhon Ratchasima |
| (Thailand) Pimpichaya Kokram | (Thailand) 3BB Nakornnont | (Indonesia) Bandung Bank BJB Pakuan |
| (Thailand) Piyanut Pannoy | (Kazakhstan) Altay Oskemen | (Thailand) Supreme Chonburi |
| (Thailand) Pleumjit Thinkaow | (Thailand) Bangkok Glass | (Thailand) Supreme Chonburi |
| (Thailand) Pornpun Guedpard | (Thailand) Bangkok Glass | (Indonesia) Jakarta PGN Popsivo Polwan |
| (United States) Sareea Freeman | (Thailand) Supreme Chonburi | (Peru) Regatas Lima |
| (United States) Taylor Sandbothe | (Thailand) Supreme Chonburi | (United States) Ohio University |
| (Venezuela) Aleoscar Blanco | (Thailand) Supreme Chonburi | (Peru) Regatas Lima |
| (Vietnam) Trần Thị Bích Thuỷ | (Vietnam) Đức Giang Hà Nội | (Thailand) Air Force |
| (Vietnam) Trịnh Thị Khánh | (Vietnam) Đức Giang Hà Nội | (Thailand) Air Force |

==== Second leg ====
| Name | Moving from | Moving to |
|---|---|---|
| (Brazil) Thaynara Emmel | (Thailand) Khonkaen Star | Free agent |
| (China) Wang Na | (China) Zhejiang | (Thailand) Supreme Chonburi |
| (China) Zheng Yixin | (China) Fujian Xi Meng Bao | (Thailand) 3BB Nakornnont |
| (Kenya) Mercy Moim | Kenya Prisons | (Thailand) Supreme Chonburi |
| (Senegal) Fatou Diouck | (Thailand) Supreme Chonburi | (South Korea) Gyeongbuk Gimcheon Hi-pass |
| (Thailand) Airada Poldon | (Thailand) Rangsit University | (Thailand) Khonkaen Star |
| (Thailand) Ajcharaporn Kongyot | (Indonesia) Jakarta BNI 46 | (Thailand) Supreme Chonburi |
| (Thailand) Jutarat Montripila | (Indonesia) Jakarta Elektrik PLN | (Thailand) 3BB Nakornnont |
| (Thailand) Kanjana Kuthaisong | (Thailand) 3BB Nakornnont | (Thailand) King-Bangkok |
| (Thailand) Pornpun Guedpard | (Indonesia) Jakarta PGN Popsivo Polwan | (Thailand) Khonkaen Star |
| (Thailand) Pimpichaya Kokram | (Indonesia) Bandung Bank BJB Pakuan | (Thailand) 3BB Nakornnont |
| (Turkey) Yeliz Başa | (Indonesia) Jakarta PGN Popsivo Polwan | (Thailand) Nakhon Ratchasima |
| (Thailand) Wiriya Songmuang | (Thailand) King-Bangkok | (Thailand) Supreme Chonburi |
| (China) Zheng Yixin | (Thailand) 3BB Nakornnont | (China) Fujian Xi Meng Bao |

== Format ==
=== Regular season ===
- First leg: single round-robin.
- Second leg: single round-robin.

==== Regular season standing procedure ====
1. Number of matches won
2. Match points
3. Sets ratio
4. Points ratio
5. Result of the last match between the tied teams

Match won 3–0 or 3–1: 3 match points for the winner, 0 match points for the loser
Match won 3–2: 2 match points for the winner, 1 match point for the loser

== Venues ==
| Bangkok | 2018–19 Women's Volleyball Thailand League (Thailand) | Chonburi |
|---|---|---|
| MCC Hall The Mall Bangkapi ^{A} | 2018–19 Women's Volleyball Thailand League (Thailand) | Chonburi Municipal Gymnasium ^{B} |
| Capacity: 5,000 | 2018–19 Women's Volleyball Thailand League (Thailand) | Capacity: 4,000 |
| Khon Kaen | 2018–19 Women's Volleyball Thailand League (Thailand) | Nakhon Ratchasima |
| KICE ^{C} | 2018–19 Women's Volleyball Thailand League (Thailand) | Liptapanlop Hall |
| Capacity: 4,000 | 2018–19 Women's Volleyball Thailand League (Thailand) | Capacity: 2,000 |
| Nakhon Ratchasima | 2018–19 Women's Volleyball Thailand League (Thailand) | Nonthaburi |
| MCC Hall The Mall Korat | 2018–19 Women's Volleyball Thailand League (Thailand) | MCC Hall The Mall Ngamwongwan |
| Capacity: 5,000 | 2018–19 Women's Volleyball Thailand League (Thailand) | Capacity: 5,000 |

Note
^A Keelawes 1 Gymnasium is initiatively proposed venue in Week 4 (17 to 18 November 2018), but TVA moved venue to Mcc Hall The Mall Bangkapi.
^B Chonburi Municipal Gymnasium is initiatively proposed venue in Week 5 (1 to 2 December 2018), but TVA moved venue to Mcc Hall The Mall Bangkapi.
^C Khon Kaen Provincial Gymnasium is initiatively proposed venue in Week 6 and 7 (15 to 16 and 22 to 23 December 2018), but TVA moved venue to Khonkaen International Convention and Exhibition Center.

== Regular season ==
=== League table ===
| Pos | Team | Pld | W | L | Pts | SW | SL | SR | SPW | SPL | SPR | Qualification |
|---|---|---|---|---|---|---|---|---|---|---|---|---|
| 1 | Nakhon Ratchasima The Mall | 14 | 14 | 0 | 42 | 42 | 4 | 10.500 | 1051 | 812 | 1.294 | Qualification to Finals series and Super League |
| 2 | Generali Supreme Chonburi-E.Tech | 14 | 11 | 3 | 33 | 35 | 13 | 2.692 | 1142 | 923 | 1.237 | Qualification to Finals series, Super League and Asian Club Championship |
| 3 | 3BB Nakornnont | 14 | 10 | 4 | 28 | 32 | 17 | 1.882 | 1129 | 941 | 1.200 | Qualification to Finals series and Super League |
| 4 | Thai–Denmark Khonkaen Star | 14 | 9 | 5 | 28 | 31 | 18 | 1.722 | 1112 | 1043 | 1.066 | Qualification to Finals series and Super League |
| 5 | Quint Air Force | 14 | 6 | 8 | 17 | 22 | 29 | 0.759 | 1109 | 1042 | 1.064 | Qualification to Super League |
| 6 | Opart 369 | 14 | 3 | 11 | 11 | 16 | 33 | 0.485 | 951 | 1128 | 0.843 | Qualification to Super League |
| 7 | King-Bangkok | 14 | 3 | 11 | 9 | 13 | 37 | 0.351 | 855 | 1092 | 0.783 | Relegation to Pro Challenge |
| 8 | Rangsit University | 14 | 0 | 14 | 0 | 2 | 42 | 0.048 | 747 | 1096 | 0.682 | Relegation to Pro Challenge |

Source: VTL 2019 official microsite

=== Head-to-Head results ===
Leg 1
| Home \ Away | BKK | QAF | OPR | KKN | NMA | NKN | RSU | SUP |
|---|---|---|---|---|---|---|---|---|
| King-Bangkok | | 2–3 | 3–2 | 0–3 | 0–3 | 0–3 | 3–1 | 0–3 |
| Quint Air Force | 3–2 | | 3–0 | 0–3 | 0–3 | 2–3 | 3–0 | 0–3 |
| Opart 369 | 2–3 | 0–3 | | 0–3 | 1–3 | 0–3 | 3–0 | 1–3 |
| Thai–Denmark Khonkaen Star | 3–0 | 3–0 | 3–0 | | 0–3 | 2–3 | 3–0 | 0–3 |
| Nakhon Ratchasima The Mall | 3–0 | 3–0 | 3–1 | 3–0 | | 3–0 | 3–0 | 3–1 |
| 3BB Nakornnont | 3–0 | 3–2 | 3–0 | 3–2 | 0–3 | | 3–0 | 3–1 |
| Rangsit University | 1–3 | 0–3 | 0–3 | 0–3 | 0–3 | 0–3 | | 0–3 |
| Generali Supreme Chonburi-E.Tech | 3–0 | 3–0 | 3–1 | 3–0 | 1–3 | 1–3 | 3–0 | |

Legend: Blue = home team win; Yellow = draw; Red = away team win.

Leg 2
| Home \ Away | BKK | QAF | OPR | KKN | NMA | NKN | RSU | SUP |
|---|---|---|---|---|---|---|---|---|
| King-Bangkok | | 1–3 | | | | 0–3 | 3–1 | |
| Quint Air Force | 3–1 | | | 1–3 | | | | |
| Opart 369 | | | | 1–3 | | | | 0–3 |
| Thai–Denmark Khonkaen Star | | 3–1 | 3–1 | | | | 3–0 | |
| Nakhon Ratchasima The Mall | | | | | | 3–0 | 3–0 | 3–0 |
| 3BB Nakornnont | 3–0 | | | | 0–3 | | | 1–3 |
| Rangsit University | 1–3 | | | 0–3 | 0–3 | | | |
| Generali Supreme Chonburi-E.Tech | | | 3–0 | | 0–3 | 3–1 | | |

Legend: Blue = home team win; Yellow = draw; Red = away team win.

=== Positions by round ===
| Leader |
| Qualification to Finals series |
| Relegation to Pro Challenge |

| Team ╲ Round | 1 | 2 | 3 | 4 | 5 | 6 | 7 | 8 | 9 | 10 | 11 | 12 | 13 | 14 |
|---|---|---|---|---|---|---|---|---|---|---|---|---|---|---|
| Nakhon Ratchasima The Mall | 1 | 1 | 2 | 1 | 1 | 1 | 1 | 1 | 1 | 1 | 1 | 1 | 1 | 1 |
| Generali Supreme Chonburi-E.Tech | 6 | 4 | 6 | 5 | 4 | 3 | 3 | 2 | 2 | 3 | 3 | 2 | 2 | 2 |
| 3BB Nakornnont | 3 | 5 | 3 | 4 | 2 | 2 | 2 | 3 | 4 | 4 | 4 | 3 | 3 | 3 |
| Thai–Denmark Khonkaen Star | 2 | 2 | 1 | 2 | 3 | 4 | 4 | 4 | 3 | 2 | 2 | 3 | 4 | 4 |
| Quint Air Force | 4 | 6 | 4 | 3 | 5 | 5 | 5 | 5 | 5 | 5 | 5 | 5 | 5 | 5 |
| Opart 369 | 7 | 8 | 8 | 7 | 7 | 7 | 7 | 7 | 7 | 7 | 7 | 7 | 6 | 6 |
| King-Bangkok | 5 | 3 | 5 | 6 | 6 | 6 | 6 | 6 | 6 | 6 | 6 | 6 | 7 | 7 |
| Rangsit University | 8 | 7 | 7 | 8 | 8 | 8 | 8 | 8 | 8 | 8 | 8 | 8 | 8 | 8 |

=== Results ===
==== First leg ====
All times are Indochina Time (UTC+07:00).

===== Week 1 – Chonburi =====
| Date | Time | | Score | | Set 1 | Set 2 | Set 3 | Set 4 | Set 5 | Total | Report |
|---|---|---|---|---|---|---|---|---|---|---|---|
| 27 Oct | 12:00 | King-Bangkok | 2–3 | Quint Air Force | 25–23 | 15–25 | 13–25 | 26-24 | 7-15 | 86–73 | Bulletin W1 |
| 27 Oct | 15:00 | 3BB Nakornnont | 3–1 | Generali Supreme Chonburi-E.Tech | 25–17 | 19–25 | 25–18 | 25-18 | | 94–60 | Bulletin W1 |
| 28 Oct | 12:00 | Thai–Denmark Khonkaen Star | 3–0 | Opart 369 | 25–19 | 25–12 | 25–19 | | | 75–50 | Bulletin W1 |
| 28 Oct | 18:00 | Rangsit University | 0–3 | Nakhon Ratchasima The Mall | 11–25 | 16–25 | 14–25 | | | 41–75 | Bulletin W1 |

===== Week 2 – Nakhon Ratchasima =====
| Date | Time | | Score | | Set 1 | Set 2 | Set 3 | Set 4 | Set 5 | Total | Report |
|---|---|---|---|---|---|---|---|---|---|---|---|
| 3 Nov | 12:00 | King-Bangkok | 3–1 | Rangsit University | 15–25 | 25–20 | 25–21 | 26-24 | | 91–66 | Bulletin W2 |
| 3 Nov | 18:00 | Thai–Denmark Khonkaen Star | 3–0 | Quint Air Force | 25–18 | 25–22 | 25–22 | | | 75–62 | Bulletin W2 |
| 4 Nov | 12:00 | Opart 369 | 1–3 | Generali Supreme Chonburi-E.Tech | 15–25 | 16–25 | 25–20 | 14–25 | | 70–95 | Bulletin W2 |
| 4 Nov | 18:00 | 3BB Nakornnont | 0–3 | Nakhon Ratchasima The Mall | 20–25 | 20–25 | 19–25 | | | 59–75 | Bulletin W2 |

===== Week 3 – Nakhon Ratchasima =====
| Date | Time | | Score | | Set 1 | Set 2 | Set 3 | Set 4 | Set 5 | Total | Report |
|---|---|---|---|---|---|---|---|---|---|---|---|
| 10 Nov | 12:00 | Thai–Denmark Khonkaen Star | 3–0 | Rangsit University | 25–21 | 25–20 | 25–15 | | | 75–56 | Bulletin W3 |
| 10 Nov | 18:00 | 3BB Nakornnont | 3–0 | King-Bangkok | 25–21 | 25–8 | 25–9 | | | 75–38 | Bulletin W3 |
| 11 Nov | 12:00 | Quint Air Force | 3–0 | Opart 369 | 26–24 | 25–19 | 25–15 | | | 76–58 | Bulletin W3 |
| 11 Nov | 18:00 | Generali Supreme Chonburi-E.Tech | 1–3 | Nakhon Ratchasima The Mall | 30–28 | 22–25 | 22–25 | 23–25 | | 97–103 | Bulletin W3 |

===== Week 4 – Bangkok =====
| Date | Time | | Score | | Set 1 | Set 2 | Set 3 | Set 4 | Set 5 | Total | Report |
|---|---|---|---|---|---|---|---|---|---|---|---|
| 17 Nov | 09:00 | Opart 369 | 1–3 | Nakhon Ratchasima The Mall | 14–25 | 15–25 | 25–23 | 18–25 | | 72–98 | Bulletin W4 |
| 17 Nov | 12:00 | Generali Supreme Chonburi-E.Tech | 3–0 | King-Bangkok | 25–12 | 25–12 | 25–18 | | | 75–42 | Bulletin W4 |
| 18 Nov | 09:00 | Thai–Denmark Khonkaen Star | 2–3 | 3BB Nakornnont | 25–22 | 27–25 | 23–25 | 21–25 | 13–15 | 109–112 | Bulletin W4 |
| 18 Nov | 18:00 | Quint Air Force | 3–0 | Rangsit University | 25–18 | 25–21 | 25–16 | | | 75–55 | Bulletin W4 |

===== Week 5 – Bangkok =====
| Date | Time | | Score | | Set 1 | Set 2 | Set 3 | Set 4 | Set 5 | Total | Report |
|---|---|---|---|---|---|---|---|---|---|---|---|
| 1 Dec | 12:00 | Quint Air Force | 2–3 | 3BB Nakornnont | 13–25 | 25–16 | 20–25 | 25–21 | 12–15 | 95–102 | Bulletin W5 |
| 1 Dec | 15:00 | Generali Supreme Chonburi-E.Tech | 3–0 | Thai–Denmark Khonkaen Star | 25–19 | 25–15 | 25–23 | | | 75–57 | Bulletin W5 |
| 2 Dec | 12:00 | Rangsit University | 0–3 | Opart 369 | 17–25 | 16–25 | 15–25 | | | 48–75 | Bulletin W5 |
| 2 Dec | 18:00 | Nakhon Ratchasima The Mall | 3–0 | King-Bangkok | 25–10 | 25–21 | 25–11 | | | 75–42 | Bulletin W5 |

===== Week 6 – Khon Kaen =====
| Date | Time | | Score | | Set 1 | Set 2 | Set 3 | Set 4 | Set 5 | Total | Report |
|---|---|---|---|---|---|---|---|---|---|---|---|
| 15 Dec | 12:00 | Quint Air Force | 0–3 | Generali Supreme Chonburi-E.Tech | 19–25 | 16–25 | 22–25 | | | 57–75 | Bulletin W6 |
| 15 Dec | 18:00 | Nakhon Ratchasima The Mall | 3–0 | Thai–Denmark Khonkaen Star | 25–18 | 25–17 | 25–16 | | | 75–51 | Bulletin W6 |
| 16 Dec | 12:00 | Rangsit University | 0–3 | 3BB Nakornnont | 8–25 | 13–25 | 16–25 | | | 37–75 | Bulletin W6 |
| 16 Dec | 18:00 | Opart 369 | 2–3 | King-Bangkok | 25–23 | 22–25 | 26–24 | 21-25 | 15-9 | 109–72 | Bulletin W6 |

===== Week 7 – Khon Kaen =====
| Date | Time | | Score | | Set 1 | Set 2 | Set 3 | Set 4 | Set 5 | Total | Report |
|---|---|---|---|---|---|---|---|---|---|---|---|
| 22 Dec | 12:00 | Rangsit University | 0–3 | Generali Supreme Chonburi-E.Tech | 8–25 | 5–25 | 22–25 | | | 35–75 | Bulletin W7 |
| 22 Dec | 18:00 | Nakhon Ratchasima The Mall | 3–0 | Quint Air Force | 25–20 | 28–26 | 25–22 | | | 78–68 | Bulletin W7 |
| 23 Dec | 12:00 | 3BB Nakornnont | 3–0 | Opart 369 | 25–19 | 25–16 | 25–17 | | | 75–52 | Bulletin W7 |
| 23 Dec | 18:00 | King-Bangkok | 0–3 | Thai–Denmark Khonkaen Star | 19–25 | 16–25 | 14–25 | | | 49–75 | Bulletin W7 |

==== Second leg ====
All times are Indochina Time (UTC+07:00).

===== Week 8 – Khon Kaen =====
| Date | Time | | Score | | Set 1 | Set 2 | Set 3 | Set 4 | Set 5 | Total | Report |
|---|---|---|---|---|---|---|---|---|---|---|---|
| 5 Jan | 12:00 | Rangsit University | 0–3 | Nakhon Ratchasima The Mall | 22–25 | 23–25 | 12–25 | | | 57–75 | Bulletin W8 |
| 5 Jan | 18:00 | 3BB Nakornnont | 1–3 | Generali Supreme Chonburi-E.Tech | 25–27 | 23–25 | 25–18 | 20–25 | | 93–95 | Bulletin W8 |
| 6 Jan | 12:00 | King-Bangkok | 1–3 | Quint Air Force | 20–25 | 23–25 | 25–22 | 10–25 | | 78–97 | Bulletin W8 |
| 6 Jan | 18:00 | Thai–Denmark Khonkaen Star | 3–1 | Opart 369 | 25–12 | 25–11 | 20–25 | 25–15 | | 95–63 | Bulletin W8 |

===== Week 9 – Nonthaburi =====
| Date | Time | | Score | | Set 1 | Set 2 | Set 3 | Set 4 | Set 5 | Total | Report |
|---|---|---|---|---|---|---|---|---|---|---|---|
| 26 Jan | 09:00 | King-Bangkok | 3–1 | Rangsit University | 25–20 | 27–29 | 25–19 | 25–19 | | 102–87 | Bulletin W9 |
| 26 Jan | 18:00 | Thai–Denmark Khonkaen Star | 3–1 | Quint Air Force | 18–25 | 25–18 | 25–21 | 25–14 | | 93–78 | Bulletin W9 |
| 27 Jan | 09:00 | Opart 369 | 0–3 | Generali Supreme Chonburi-E.Tech | 18–25 | 19–25 | 10–25 | | | 47–75 | Bulletin W9 |
| 27 Jan | 18:00 | 3BB Nakornnont | 0–3 | Nakhon Ratchasima The Mall | 13–25 | 14–25 | 24–26 | | | 51–76 | Bulletin W9 |

===== Week 10 – Nonthaburi =====
| Date | Time | | Score | | Set 1 | Set 2 | Set 3 | Set 4 | Set 5 | Total | Report |
|---|---|---|---|---|---|---|---|---|---|---|---|
| 2 Feb | 09:00 | Thai–Denmark Khonkaen Star | 3–0 | Rangsit University | 25–15 | 25–15 | 25–21 | | | 75–51 | Bulletin W10 |
| 2 Feb | 18:00 | King-Bangkok | 0–3 | 3BB Nakornnont | 19–25 | 17–25 | 22–25 | | | 58–75 | Bulletin W10 |
| 3 Feb | 09:00 | Opart 369 | 2–3 | Quint Air Force | 27–25 | 17–25 | 25–19 | 16–25 | 12–15 | 97–109 | Bulletin W10 |
| 3 Feb | 18:00 | Generali Supreme Chonburi-E.Tech | 0–3 | Nakhon Ratchasima The Mall | 18–25 | 21–25 | 23–25 | | | 62–75 | Bulletin W10 |

===== Week 11 – Nakhon Ratchasima =====
| Date | Time | | Score | | Set 1 | Set 2 | Set 3 | Set 4 | Set 5 | Total | Report |
|---|---|---|---|---|---|---|---|---|---|---|---|
| 9 Feb | 09:00 | Generali Supreme Chonburi-E.Tech | 3–0 | King-Bangkok | 25–21 | 25–10 | 25–15 | | | 75–46 | Bulletin W11 |
| 9 Feb | 18:00 | Thai–Denmark Khonkaen Star | 3–1 | 3BB Nakornnont | 25–24 | 25–23 | 14–25 | 25–21 | | 89–93 | Bulletin W11 |
| 10 Feb | 12:00 | Rangsit University | 0–3 | Quint Air Force | 11–25 | 21–25 | 19–25 | | | 51–75 | Bulletin W11 |
| 10 Feb | 18:00 | Opart 369 | 0–3 | Nakhon Ratchasima The Mall | 19–25 | 25–27 | 16–25 | | | 60–77 | Bulletin W11 |

===== Week 12 – Nakhon Ratchasima =====
| Date | Time | | Score | | Set 1 | Set 2 | Set 3 | Set 4 | Set 5 | Total | Report |
|---|---|---|---|---|---|---|---|---|---|---|---|
| 16 Feb | 09:00 | 3BB Nakornnont | 3–0 | Quint Air Force | 25–20 | 25–16 | 25–15 | | | 75–51 | Bulletin W12 |
| 16 Feb | 18:00 | Thai–Denmark Khonkaen Star | 1–3 | Generali Supreme Chonburi-E.Tech | 25–18 | 22–25 | 17–25 | 15–25 | | 79–93 | Bulletin W12 |
| 17 Feb | 09:00 | Rangsit University | 0–3 | Opart 369 | 23–25 | 21–25 | 16–25 | | | 60–75 | Bulletin W12 |
| 17 Feb | 18:00 | King-Bangkok | 1–3 | Nakhon Ratchasima The Mall | 25–22 | 21–25 | 20–25 | 20–25 | | 86–97 | Bulletin W12 |

===== Week 13 – Bangkok =====
| Date | Time | | Score | | Set 1 | Set 2 | Set 3 | Set 4 | Set 5 | Total | Report |
|---|---|---|---|---|---|---|---|---|---|---|---|
| 23 Feb | 09:00 | King-Bangkok | 0–3 | Opart 369 | 22–25 | 21–25 | 17–25 | | | 60–75 | Bulletin W13 |
| 23 Feb | 18:00 | Generali Supreme Chonburi-E.Tech | 3–1 | Quint Air Force | 22–25 | 25–13 | 25–17 | 25–22 | | 97–77 | Bulletin W13 |
| 24 Feb | 09:00 | Thai–Denmark Khonkaen Star | 1–3 | Nakhon Ratchasima The Mall | 23–25 | 25–19 | 18–25 | 23–25 | | 89–94 | Bulletin W13 |
| 24 Feb | 18:00 | 3BB Nakornnont | 3–0 | Rangsit University | 25–10 | 25–13 | 25–16 | | | 75–39 | Bulletin W13 |

===== Week 14 – Bangkok =====
| Date | Time | | Score | | Set 1 | Set 2 | Set 3 | Set 4 | Set 5 | Total | Report |
|---|---|---|---|---|---|---|---|---|---|---|---|
| 2 Mar | 09:00 | Generali Supreme Chonburi-E.Tech | 3–0 | Rangsit University | 25–15 | 25–16 | 25–17 | | | 75–48 | Bulletin W14 |
| 2 Mar | 18:00 | Thai–Denmark Khonkaen Star | 3–0 | King-Bangkok | 25–21 | 25–10 | 25–16 | | | 75–47 | Bulletin W14 |
| 3 Mar | 09:00 | Opart 369 | 0–3 | 3BB Nakornnont | 18–25 | 10–25 | 23–25 | | | 51–75 | Bulletin W14 |
| 3 Mar | 18:00 | Nakhon Ratchasima The Mall | 3–0 | Quint Air Force | 25–19 | 25–18 | 25–16 | | | 75–53 | Bulletin W14 |

== Finals series ==
All times are Indochina Time (UTC+07:00).

=== Final Team ===
| Pos | Club |
|---|---|
| 1 | Nakhon Ratchasima The Mall |
| 2 | Generali Supreme Chonburi-E.Tech |
| 3 | 3BB Nakornnont |
| 4 | Thai–Denmark Khonkaen Star |

=== Venue ===
The final series matches are played at the MCC Hall The Mall Bang Kapi in Bangkok.

| Bang Kapi | Bangkok Metropolis |
|---|---|
| MCC Hall The Mall Bang Kapi | Bangkok Metropolis |
| Capacity: 10,000 | Bangkok Metropolis |
| | 2018–19 Women's Volleyball Thailand League (Bangkok) |

=== Semi-finals ===
| Date | Time | | Score | | Set 1 | Set 2 | Set 3 | Set 4 | Set 5 | Total | Report |
|---|---|---|---|---|---|---|---|---|---|---|---|
| 16 Mar | 15:00 | Nakhon Ratchasima | 3–1 | Thai–Denmark Khonkaen Star | 25–15 | 25–13 | 25–27 | 25–18 | | 100–73 | P2 |
| 16 Mar | 18:00 | Generali Supreme Chonburi-E.Tech | 3–0 | 3BB Nakornnont | 25–19 | 25–20 | 25–21 | | | 75–60 | P2 |

=== 3rd place ===
| Date | Time | | Score | | Set 1 | Set 2 | Set 3 | Set 4 | Set 5 | Total | Report |
|---|---|---|---|---|---|---|---|---|---|---|---|
| 17 Mar | 12:00 | Thai–Denmark Khonkaen Star | 1–3 | 3BB Nakornnont | 21–25 | 25–14 | 20–25 | 20–25 | | 86–89 | P2 |

=== Final ===
| Date | Time | | Score | | Set 1 | Set 2 | Set 3 | Set 4 | Set 5 | Total | Report |
|---|---|---|---|---|---|---|---|---|---|---|---|
| 17 Mar | 15:00 | Nakhon Ratchasima | 3–0 | Generali Supreme Chonburi-E.Tech | 25–23 | 25–20 | 26–24 | | | 76–67 | P2 |

== Final standing ==
| Rank | Team |
|---|---|
| 1st place, gold medalist(s) | Nakhon Ratchasima |
| 2nd place, silver medalist(s) | Supreme Chonburi |
| 3rd place, bronze medalist(s) | 3BB Nakornnont |
| 4 | Thai–Denmark Khonkaen Star |
| 5 | Quint Air Force |
| 6 | Opart 369 |
| 7 | King-Bangkok |
| 8 | Rangsit University |

| Qualified for the Asian Championship and Super League |
| Qualified for the Super League |
| Relegated to Pro Challenge |

2018–19 Women's Thailand League

Champion
Team roster
Yupa Sanitklang, Tikamporn Changkeaw, Sirima Manakit, Usa Daowern, Preeya Hindam, Onuma Sittirak (C), Nokyoong Paowana, Krittkanan Phansamdaeng, Jarasporn Bundasak, Wanitchaya Luangtonglang, Mai Okumura, Nootsara Tomkom, Yaowalak Mahaon, Malika Kanthong, Papharat Khotchum, Wiranyupa Inchan, Amporn Hyapha, Yeliz Başa
Head coach
Wanna Buakaew

== Awards ==
- Most valuable player
  (Thailand) Onuma Sittirak (Nakhon Ratchasima)
- Best Best Scorer
  (Thailand) Kuttika Kaewpin (Nakornnonthaburi)
- Best outside spiker
  (Thailand) Kuttika Kaewpin (Nakornnonthaburi)
  (Thailand) Wilavan Apinyapong (Supreme Chonburi)
- Best servers
  (Thailand) Kuttika Kaewpin (Nakornnonthaburi)
- Best middle blocker
  (Thailand) Pleumjit Thinkaow (Supreme Chonburi)
  (Vietnam) Trần Thị Bích Thủy (Quint Air Force)
- Best setter
  (Thailand) Kullapa Piampongsan (Khonkaen)
- Best opposite spiker
  (Thailand) Malika Kanthong (Nakhon Ratchasima)
- Best libero
  (Thailand) Tapaphaipun Chaisri (Khonkaen)

== Statistics leader ==
The statistics of each group follows the vis reports P2 and P5. The statistics include 6 volleyball skills; serve, reception, set, spike, block, and dig. The table below shows the top 5 ranked players in each skill plus top scorers at the completion of the tournament.

=== Regular season ===
After Leg 2 Week 7

==== Best Scorers ====
Best Scorers
| | Player | Team | Scores |
|---|---|---|---|
| 1 | (Thailand) Kuttika Kaewpin | 3BB Nakornnont | 226 |
| 2 | (Thailand) Pleumjit Thinkaow | Generali Supreme Chonburi-E.Tech | 212 |
| 3 | (Thailand) Wanitchaya Luangtonglang | Nakhon Ratchasima The Mall | 178 |
| 4 | (Thailand) Sasipaporn Janthawisut | 3BB Nakornnont | 177 |
| 4 | (Thailand) Sutadta Chuewulim | Quint Air Force | 170 |

==== Best Spikers ====
Best Spikers
| | Player | Team | % |
|---|---|---|---|
| 1 | (Thailand) Pleumjit Thinkaow | Generali Supreme Chonburi-E.Tech | 48.18 |
| 2 | (Thailand) Kuttika Kaewpin | 3BB Nakornnont | 39.75 |
| 3 | (Thailand) Wanitchaya Luangtonglang | Nakhon Ratchasima The Mall | 38.19 |
| 4 | (Thailand) Onuma Sittirak | Nakhon Ratchasima The Mall | 37.92 |
| 5 | (Thailand) Wilavan Apinyapong | Generali Supreme Chonburi-E.Tech | 34.55 |

==== Best Blockers ====
Best Blockers
| | Player | Team | Avg |
|---|---|---|---|
| 1 | (Thailand) Pleumjit Thinkaow | Generali Supreme Chonburi-E.Tech | 0.90 |
| 1 | (Vietnam) Trần Thị Bích Thủy | Quint Air Force | 0.82 |
| 3 | (Thailand) Thatdao Nuekjang | Thai–Denmark Khonkaen Star | 0.69 |
| 4 | (Hong Kong) Yeung Sau Mei | 3BB Nakornnont | 0.69 |
| 5 | (Thailand) Tichakorn Boonlert | 3BB Nakornnont | 0.63 |

==== Best Servers ====
Best Servers
| | Player | Team | Avg |
|---|---|---|---|
| 1 | (Thailand) Suluckana Pantong | Rangsit University | 0.45 |
| 2 | (Thailand) Kuttika Kaewpin | 3BB Nakornnont | 0.33 |
| 3 | (Thailand) Thidarat Phengvechai | Quint Air Force | 0.33 |
| 4 | (Thailand) Thatdao Nuekjang | Thai–Denmark Khonkaen Star | 0.31 |
| 5 | (Thailand) Malika Kanthong | Generali Supreme Chonburi-E.Tech | 0.30 |

==== Best Diggers ====
Best Diggers
| | Player | Team | Avg |
|---|---|---|---|
| 1 | (Thailand) Tapaphaipun Chaisri | Thai–Denmark Khonkaen Star | 2.39 |
| 2 | (Thailand) Anisa Yotpinit | Opart 369 | 1.57 |
| 3 | (Thailand) Rapinnipa Kehatankhunanon | King-Bangkok | 1.52 |
| 4 | (Thailand) Sujitra Phosom | 3BB Nakornnont | 1.27 |
| 5 | (Thailand) Supattra Pairoj | Generali Supreme Chonburi-E.Tech | 1.27 |

==== Best Setters ====
Best Setters
| | Player | Team | Avg |
|---|---|---|---|
| 1 | (Thailand) Kullapa Piampongsan | Thai–Denmark Khonkaen Star | 7.02 |
| 2 | (Thailand) Narumon Khanan | 3BB Nakornnont | 5.82 |
| 3 | (Thailand) Nootsara Tomkom | Nakhon Ratchasima The Mall | 5.43 |
| 4 | (Thailand) Natthanicha Jaisaen | Quint Air Force | 4.76 |
| 5 | (Thailand) Waraporn Poomjarern | Generali Supreme Chonburi-E.Tech | 4.69 |

==== Best Receivers ====
Best Receivers
| | Player | Team | % |
|---|---|---|---|
| 1 | (Thailand) Tapaphaipun Chaisri | Thai-Denmark Khonkaen Star | 31.65 |
| 2 | (Thailand) Sujitra Phosom | 3BB Nakornnont | 20.87 |
| 3 | (Thailand) Wilavan Apinyapong | Generali Supreme Chonburi-E.Tech | 18.67 |
| 4 | (Thailand) Kuttika Kaewpin | 3BB Nakornnont | 14.88 |
| 5 | (Thailand) Dueanpen Areeluea | Ouint Air Force | 12.29 |

== See also ==
- 2018–19 Men's Volleyball Thailand League
- 2018 Women's Volleyball Kor Royal Cup
- 2018 Women's Volleyball Pro Challenge
- 2018 Men's Volleyball Kor Royal Cup
- 2018 Men's Volleyball Pro Challenge
