= 2016 Philippine Super Liga season =

- Duration: February 18 – December 10, 2016
- TV partner(s): TV5, AksyonTV, Hyper, Sports5.ph
- Top draft pick: Ara Galang (DLSU)
- Picked by: F2 Logistics Cargo Movers
- Invitational champions: RC Cola-Army Troopers; Est Cola (co-champions)
- Invitational runners-up: Petron Tri-Activ Spikers
- Beach Challenge champions: Women's: RC Cola-Army Troopers; Men's: Philippine Navy
- Beach Challenge runners-up: Women's: Foton Toplanders; Men's: Team Volleyball Manila
- All-Filipino champions: F2 Logistics Cargo Movers
- Grand Prix champions: Foton Tornadoes
- Grand Prix runners-up: Petron Tri-Activ Spikers

Seasons
- ← 2015 2017 →

The 2016 Philippine Super Liga season was the fourth season of the Philippine Super Liga (PSL). The season started with the return of the Invitational Cup, followed by the All-Filipino and the Grand Prix conferences. The second edition of the Beach Volleyball Challenge Cup was also held.

The PSL was also chosen to organize two international volleyball tournaments for the year - the 2016 Asian Women's Club Volleyball Championship and the 2016 FIVB Volleyball Women's Club World Championship - both of which were staged in the Philippines.

== Background ==
The calendar of events for the 2016 season was finalized during the planning session between the league officials and team owners on November 11, 2015.

Starting this season, teams will offer annual exclusive contracts, instead of per-conference agreements with their players. The annual contracts will require players to play exclusively for their PSL clubs.

On September 16 to 25, selected PSL players will conduct exhibition games in the United States. After the conferences, the PSL will be holding the first Grand Volleyball Awards Night dedicated to the outstanding players and coaches who have greatest achievements in the past five conferences.

The PSL (SportsCore Event Management and Consultancy, Inc.), together with the Larong Volleyball sa Pilipinas Inc. (LVPI), will handle the hosting of the 2016 Asian Women's Club Volleyball Championship on September 3 to 11, 2016 to be held either Mall of Asia Arena or Philsports Arena, and the 2016 FIVB Volleyball Women's Club World Championship on October 18 to 23, 2016 also at the MoA Arena.

In cooperation with the Quezon City Pride Council, the PSL organized a two-day volleyball competition called "1st Quezon City Pride Volleyball Cup" on February 6–7, 2016. It was claimed as the first volleyball league in the Philippines for the LGBTs. Team Circle led by Jolas Lopez, beat Braganza team, in 4 sets, to claim the inaugural title of the QCPVC.

In June 2016, the PSL, together with the LVPI, conducted a 5-day seminar for local setters spearheaded by former South Korean men's national volleyball team head coach Kim Keung Un held at the LVPI Volleyball Center in the Arellano University campus, Manila.

During the 2016 Philippine Super Liga All-Filipino Conference, the league introduced its mascot named "Spikey".

On July 12, 2016, the PSL named F2 Logistics Cargo Movers middle blocker Mika Reyes as the ambassadress of the league for the 2016 season.

== 2016 draft ==
The draft ceremony was held at the SM Mall of Asia Music Hall, Pasay on May 27, 2016. Players who joined the draft underwent a pre-draft camp on May 24, 2016, at the Filoil Flying V Centre.

=== Draftees ===
Draftees

(A-F)

- Mary Grace Berte (HCDC / OH)
- Faith Bulan (UE / OH)
- Aileen Cabaccang (S/OH)
- Geneveve Casugod (FEU / OH)
- Kristine Dave (Adamson / L/U)

(G-L)

- Ara Galang (DLSU / OH)
- Danna Henson (Arellano / OH)
- Angelica Legacion (Arellano / S)
- Sheryl Laborte (UNO-R / L/U)
- Marlyn Llagoso (SWU / MB)

(M-R)

- Eloisa Medina (SFAC-LP / S/U)
- Jerra Mae Pacinio (SWU / L)
- Loraine Palomar (PUP / S/U)
- Lourdes Patilano (Adamson / S)
- Renelyn Raterta (UM / S)
- Christine Joy Rosario (Arellano / MB)

(S-Z)

- Jonah Saete (BulSU)
- Shirly Salamangos (Arellano / MB)
- Suzette Salas (NWSSU / S/MB)
- Jonafer San Pedro (RTU / OH/U)
- Jocelyn Soliven (NU / S)
- Christine Suyao (EAC-C / OH)

=== First round ===
Pick	Player	Position	Nationality	Team	College
1	Ara Galang	Open Hitter	Philippines	F2 Logistics Cargo Movers	DLSU
2	Christine Joy Rosario	Middle Blocker	Philippines	Petron Tri-Activ Spikers	Arellano
3	Renelyn Raterta	Setter	Philippines	Amy's Kitchen-Perpetual	UM
4	Geneveve Casugod	Middle Blocker	Philippines	Generika Lifesavers	FEU
5	Mary Grace Berte	Open Hitter	Philippines	Cignal HD Spikers	HCDC
6	Danna Henson	Open Hitter	Philippines	Foton Toplanders	Arellano
7	Jonah Sabete	Open Hitter	Philippines	Standard Insurance-Navy Corvettes	BulSU

=== Second round ===
Pick	Player	Position	Nationality	Team	College
1	Angelica Legacion	Setter	Philippines	Generika Lifesavers	Arellano
2	Marlyn Llagoso	Middle Blocker	Philippines	Cignal HD Spikers	SWU
3	Shirly Salamangos	Middle Blocker	Philippines	Foton Toplanders	Arellano

== Invitational Cup ==
2016 PSL Invitational Cup
Abbr.	Team	Company	Colors	Head coach	Team captain
CIG	Cignal HD Spikers	Cignal TV, Inc.		Sammy Acaylar	Michelle Laborte (USLS)
EST	Est Cola	Serm Suk Public Company Ltd.		Chamnan Dokmai	Jarasporn Bundasak
F2L	F2 Logistics Cargo Movers	F2 Global Logistics, Inc.		Ramil de Jesus	Charleen Cruz (DLSU)
FOT	Foton Toplanders	United Asia Automotive Group, Inc.		Ma. Vilet Ponce de Leon	Angeli Araneta (UP)
NSJ	New San Jose Builders Victorias	New San Jose Builders, Inc.		Michael Molleno	Coleen Laurice Bravo (UPHSD)
PET	Petron Tri-Activ Spikers	Petron Corporation		George Pascua	Aiza Maizo-Pontillas (UST)
RCC	RC Cola-Army Troopers	ARC Refreshments Corporation		Sgt. Emilio Reyes Jr.	Jovelyn Gonzaga (CPU)

=== Classification round ===
Pos	Team	Pld	W	L	Pts	SW	SL	SR	SPW	SPL	SPR	Qualification
1	RC Cola–Army Troopers	6	5	1	16	14	3	4.667	411	314	1.309	Final round
2	Petron Tri-Activ Spikers	6	5	1	16	14	6	2.333	440	392	1.122	Final round
3	F2 Logistics Cargo Movers	6	4	2	12	12	8	1.500	442	416	1.063	Final round
4	Cignal HD Spikers	5	3	2	9	11	8	1.375	424	397	1.068	
5	Foton Toplanders	5	1	4	3	3	13	0.231	327	378	0.865	
6	New San Jose Builders Victorias	6	0	6	0	2	18	0.111	349	496	0.704	

=== Final round ===
Pos	Team	Pld	W	L	Pts	SW	SL	SR	SPW	SPL	SPR	Qualification
1	RC Cola–Army Troopers	3	3	0	9	9	2	4.500	255	238	1.071	Champions
2	Est Cola	3	2	1	6	7	3	2.333	244	182	1.341	Co-champions
3	Petron Tri-Activ Spikers	3	1	2	3	4	7	0.571	227	261	0.870	
4	F2 Logistics Cargo Movers	3	0	3	0	1	9	0.111	198	243	0.815	

=== Final standings ===
Rank	Team
1st place, gold medalist(s)	RC Cola-Army Troopers; Est Cola (co-champion)
2nd place, silver medalist(s)	Petron Tri-Activ Spikers
3rd place, bronze medalist(s)	F2 Logistics Cargo Movers
4	Cignal HD Spikers
5	Foton Toplanders
6	New San Jose Builders Victorias

=== Awards ===
Award		Name/Team
MVP		(Philippines) Jovelyn Gonzaga (RC Cola-Army)
Best Outside Spiker	1st:	(Thailand) Sutadta Chuewulim (Est Cola)
Best Outside Spiker	2nd:	(Philippines) Honey Royse Tubino (RC Cola-Army)
Best Middle Blocker	1st:	(Philippines) Aby Maraño (F2 Logistics)
Best Middle Blocker	2nd:	(Philippines) Maica Morada (Petron)
Best Opposite Spiker		(Philippines) Aiza Maizo-Pontillas (Petron)
Best Setter		(Thailand) Tichaya Boonlert (Est Cola)
Best Libero		(Thailand) Anisa Yotpinit (Est Cola)

== All-Filipino Conference ==
2016 PSL All-Filipino Conference teams
Abbr.	Team	Company	Colors	Head coach	Team captain
AMY	Amy's Kitchen-Perpetual	Sonia Trading, Inc.		Michael Molleno	Cindy Imbo (UPHSD)
CIG	Cignal HD Spikers	Cignal TV, Inc.		Sammy Acaylar	Michelle Laborte (USLS)
FTL	F2 Logistics Cargo Movers	F2 Global Logistics, Inc.		Ramil de Jesus	Charleen Cruz (DLSU)
FOT	Foton Tornadoes	United Asia Automotive Group, Inc.		Ma. Vilet Ponce de Leon	Angeli Araneta (UP)
GEN	Generika Lifesavers	Erikagen, Inc.		Francis Vicente	Rubie de Leon (UST)
PET	Petron Tri-Activ Spikers	Petron Corporation		George Pascua	Aiza Maizo-Pontillas (UST)
RCC	RC Cola-Army Troopers	ARC Refreshments Corporation		Sgt. Emilio Reyes	Jovelyn Gonzaga (CPU)
STA	Standard Insurance-Navy Corvettes	Standard Insurance Company, Inc.		Zenaida Ybañez-Chavez	Janet Serafica (Adamson)

=== First round ===
Pos	Team	Pld	W	L	Pts	SW	SL	SR	SPW	SPL	SPR	Qualification
1	F2 Logistics Cargo Movers	7	7	0	20	21	4	5.250	605	433	1.397	Assigned to Group A
2	RC Cola–Army Troopers	7	6	1	19	20	4	5.000	576	478	1.205	Assigned to Group A
3	Petron Tri-Activ Spikers	7	5	2	15	16	8	2.000	546	487	1.121	Assigned to Group A
4	Foton Toplanders	7	4	3	12	13	10	1.300	518	464	1.116	Assigned to Group A
5	Cignal HD Spikers	7	2	5	7	9	16	0.563	509	583	0.873	Assigned to Group B
6	Generika Lifesavers	7	2	5	6	9	16	0.563	539	592	0.910	Assigned to Group B
7	Standard Insurance–Navy Corvettes	7	2	5	5	7	18	0.389	519	610	0.851	Assigned to Group B
8	Amy's Kitchen–Perpetual	7	0	7	0	2	21	0.095	408	573	0.712	Assigned to Group B

=== Second round ===
Group A

Pos	Team	Pld	W	L	Pts	SW	SL	SR	SPW	SPL	SPR
1	Foton Toplanders	3	3	0	8	9	3	3.000	275	237	1.160
2	F2 Logistics Cargo Movers	3	2	1	5	7	5	1.400	272	233	1.167
3	Petron Tri-Activ Spikers	3	1	2	4	5	6	0.833	230	242	0.950
4	RC Cola–Army Troopers	3	0	3	1	2	9	0.222	191	256	0.746

Group B

Pos	Team	Pld	W	L	Pts	SW	SL	SR	SPW	SPL	SPR
1	Generika Lifesavers	3	3	0	9	9	3	3.000	289	236	1.225
2	Cignal HD Spikers	3	2	1	6	7	4	1.750	257	219	1.174
3	Standard Insurance–Navy Corvette	3	1	2	3	4	6	0.667	201	210	0.957
4	Amy's Kitchen–Perpetual	3	0	3	0	2	9	0.222	181	263	0.688

=== Final round ===
Group A

Semifinals (single-elimination)
1	Foton	3
4	RC Cola–Army	1
2	F2 Logistics	3
3	Petron	0

Championship (best-of-three)
1	Foton	2	3	1
2	F2 Logistics	3	1	3
Third place match (single-elimination)
4	RC Cola–Army	3
3	Petron	2

Group B

5th–8th classification (single-elimination)
1	Generika	3
4	Amy's Kitchen–Perpetual	1
2	Cignal	3
3	Standard Insurance–Navy	0

Fifth place match (single-elimination)
1	Generika	3
2	Cignal	2
Seventh place match (single-elimination)
4	Amy's Kitchen–Perpetual	1
3	Standard Insurance–Navy	3

=== Final stanings ===
Rank	Team
1st place, gold medalist(s)	F2 Logistics Cargo Movers
2nd place, silver medalist(s)	Foton Tornadoes
3rd place, bronze medalist(s)	RC Cola-Army Troopers
4	Petron Tri-Activ Spikers
5	Generika Lifesavers
6	Cignal HD Spikers
7	Standard Insurance-Navy Corvettes
8	Amy's Spikers

=== Awards ===
Award		Name/Team
MVP		Dawn Macandili (F2 Logistics)
Best Outside Spiker	1st:	Ara Galang (F2 Logistics)
Best Outside Spiker	2nd:	Bernadeth Pons (Petron)
Best Middle Blocker	1st:	Aby Maraño (F2 Logistics)
Best Middle Blocker	2nd:	Jaja Santiago (Foton)
Best Opposite Spiker		Jovelyn Gonzaga (RC Cola-Army)
Best Setter		Kim Fajardo (F2 Logistics)
Best Libero		Dawn Macandili (F2 Logistics)

== Grand Prix ==
2016 PSL Grand Prix teams (Women's Division)
Abbr.	Team	Company	Colors	Head coach	Team captain	Imports
CIG	Cignal HD Spikers	Cignal TV, Inc.		(Philippines) Sammy Acaylar	Michelle Laborte (USLS)	(Puerto Rico) Lynda Morales (United States) Laura Schaudt
FTL	F2 Logistics Cargo Movers	F2 Global Logistics, Inc.		(Philippines) Ramil de Jesus	Charleen Cruz (DLSU)	(United States) Sydney Jae Kemper (United States) Hayley Dora Spelman
FOT	Foton Tornadoes	United Asia Automotive Group, Inc.		(Serbia) Moro Branislav	Lindsay Stalzer (Bradley)	(United States) Lindsay Stalzer (United States) Ariel Usher
GEN	Generika Lifesavers	Erikagen, Inc.		(Philippines) Francis Vicente	Jeushl Wensh Tiu (DLSU)	(Ukraine) Polina Liutikova (Tobago) Darlene Ramdin
PET	Petron Tri-Activ Spikers	Petron Corporation		(Philippines) Cesael Delos Santos	Frances Molina (San Beda)	(United States) Stephanie Niemer (United States) Serena Warner
RCC	RC Cola-Army Troopers	ARC Refreshments Corporation		(Philippines) Sgt. Emilio Reyes	Tina Salak (FEU)	(United States) Kierra Holst (United States) Hallie Rose Ripley

=== Preliminary round ===
Pos	Team	Pld	W	L	Pts	SW	SL	SR	SPW	SPL	SPR	Qualification
1	Foton Tornadoes	10	9	1	25	28	9	3.111	500	392	1.276	Semifinals
2	Petron Tri-Activ Spikers	10	8	2	25	27	9	3.000	590	482	1.224	Semifinals
3	F2 Logistics Cargo Movers	10	7	3	20	21	14	1.500	519	507	1.024	Quarterfinals
4	RC Cola–Army Troopers	10	4	6	13	15	20	0.750	446	492	0.907	Quarterfinals
5	Generika Lifesavers	10	1	9	4	9	27	0.333	483	605	0.798	Quarterfinals
6	Cignal HD Spikers	10	1	9	3	8	29	0.276	428	488	0.877	Quarterfinals

=== Playoffs ===
Quarterfinals (single-elimination)
4	RC Cola–Army	3
5	Generika	0
3	F2 Logistics	3
6	Cignal	1

Semifinals (single-elimination)
1	Foton	3
4	RC Cola–Army	2
2	Petron	3
3	F2 Logistics	2

Championship (best-of-three)
1	Foton	3	3	–
2	Petron	2	1	–

=== Final standings ===
Rank	Team
1st place, gold medalist(s)	Foton Tornadoes
2nd place, silver medalist(s)	Petron Blaze Spikers
3rd place, bronze medalist(s)	F2 Logistics Cargo Movers
4	RC Cola-Army Troopers
5	Generika Lifesavers
6	Cignal HD Spikers

=== Awards ===
Award		Name/Team
MVP		(Philippines) Jaja Santiago (Foton)
Best Outside Spiker	1st:	(United States) Stephanie Niemer (Petron)
Best Outside Spiker	2nd:	(United States) Ariel Usher (Foton)
Best Middle Blocker	1st:	(Philippines) Aby Maraño (F2 Logistics)
Best Middle Blocker	2nd:	(Philippines) Maika Ortiz (Foton)
Best Opposite Spiker	1st:	(Philippines) Jovelyn Gonzaga (RC Cola-Army)
Best Opposite Spiker	2nd:	(Philippines) Aiza Maizo-Pontillas (Petron)
Best Setter		(Philippines) Kim Fajardo (F2 Logistics)
Best Libero		(Philippines) Dawn Macandili (F2 Logistics)

== Beach Volleyball Challenge Cup ==
=== Women's division ===
2016 PSL Beach Volleyball Challenge Cup teams (Women's Division)
Abbr.	Team	Company	Colors	Players
AQP	Accel Quantum Plus	Sporteum Philippines		Aileen Abuel and Princess Listana
CIG	Cignal Team Awesome	Cignal TV, Inc.		Vhima Condada and Mary Grace Berte
F2L	F2 Logistics Cargo Movers	F2 Global Logistics, Inc.		Danika Gendrauli and Aby Maraño
FEU	FEU Lady Tamaraws-Petron	Far Eastern University / Petron Corporation		Bernadeth Pons and Kyla Atienza
FOT	Foton Toplanders	United Asia Automotive Group, Inc.		Cherry Rondina and Patty Orendain
MIT	Mapúa Lady Cardinals (NOTE)	Mapúa Institute of Technology		Shaira Hermano and Niella Ramillo
MER	Meralco Power Spikers	Manila Electric Company		April Ross Hingpit and Jonafer San Pedro
PET-A	Petron Sprint 4T (Team A)	Petron Corporation		Maica Morada and Frances Molina
PET-B	Petron XCS (Team B)	Petron Corporation		Aiza Maizo-Pontillas and Shiela Marie Pineda
SN-A	Standard Insurance-Navy Corvettes (Team A)	Standard Insurance / Philippine Navy		Norie Jane Diaz and Ma. Paulina Soriano
SN-B	Standard Insurance-Navy Corvettes (Team B)	Standard Insurance / Philippine Navy		Florence Madulid and Pauline Genido
RCC-A	RC Cola-Army Troopers (Team A)	ARC Refreshments Corporation		Jovelyn Gonzaga and Nerissa Bautista
RCC-B	RC Cola-Army Troopers (Team B)	ARC Refreshments Corporation		Jeannie delos Reyes and Genie Sabas
UE	UE Lady Warriors	University of the East		Jasmine Alcayde and Angelica Dacaymat

NOTE: Withdrew during Day 1 of the tournament.

Playoffs:

Quarter-finals
B1	F2 Logistics (F2L)	17	16
C2	Petron XCS (PET-B)	21	21
D1	RC Cola-Army "A" (RCC-A)	21	21
B2	Petron Sprint 4T (PET-A)	14	12
A1	Standard Ins.-Navy "A" (SN-A)	21	20	10
D2	FEU-Petron (FEU)	13	22	15
C1	Foton Toplanders (FOT)	21	21
A2	RC Cola-Army "B" (RCC-B)	8	14

Semi-finals
C2	Petron XCS (PET-B)	0	0	0
D1	RC Cola-Army "A" (RCC-A)	0	0	0
D2	FEU-Petron (FEU)	0	0	0
C1	Foton Toplanders (FOT)	0	0	0

Final
D1	RC Cola-Army "A" (RCC-A)	0	0	0
C1	Foton Toplanders (FOT)	0	0	0
Bronze medal match
C2	Petron XCS (PET-B)	0	0	0
D2	FEU-Petron (FEU)	0	0	0

Final standing:

Rank	Team
1st place, gold medalist(s)	RC Cola-Army Troopers (Team A)
2nd place, silver medalist(s)	Foton Toplanders
3rd place, bronze medalist(s)	FEU-Petron
4	Petron XCS
5	F2 Logistics Cargo Movers
6	Standard Insurance-Navy (Team A)
7	RC Cola-Army Troopers (Team B)
8	Petron Sprint 4T
9	
10	
11	
12	
13	

=== Men's division ===
2016 PSL Beach Volleyball Challenge Cup teams (Men's Division)
Abbr.	Team	Company	Colors	Players
CIG	Cignal Team Awesome	Cignal TV, Inc.		Rey Taneo and Relan Taneo
IEM	IEM Volley Masters	Instituto Estetico Manila		Arjay Salcedo and Bobby Gatdula
FEU-A	FEU Tamaraws (Team A)	Far Eastern University		Joel Cayaban and Franco Camcam
FEU-B	FEU Tamaraws (Team B)	Far Eastern University		Rikko Mamerto and Greg Dolor
PN-A	Philippine Navy (Team A)	Philippine Navy		Nur-amin Madsairi and Roldan Medino
PN-B	Philippine Navy (Team B)	Philippine Navy		Pajiji Alsali and Milover Parcon
SM	SM By The Bay	SM Prime Holdings		Daniel Young and Tim Young
TVM	Team Volleyball Manila	Team Volleyball Manila		Kris Guzman and Christian Arbasto
UE	UE Red Warriors	University of the East		Geric Rodmar Ortega and Ruvince Abrot
WAY	Wayuk			Philip Bagalay and Paul John Cuzon

Playoffs:

Semifinals
29 May
Philippine Navy "B" (PN-B)	0
Team Volleyball Manila (TVM)	0
29 May
Philippine Navy "A" (PN-A)	0
FEU "A" (FEU-A)	0

Final
29 May
Philippine Navy "A" (PN-A)	0
Team Volleyball Manila (TVM)	0
Third place
29 May
Philippine Navy "B" (PN-B)	0
FEU "A" (FEU-A)	0

Final standing:

Rank	Team
1st place, gold medalist(s)	Philippine Navy (Team A)
2nd place, silver medalist(s)	Team Volleyball Manila
3rd place, bronze medalist(s)	FEU (Team A)
4	Philippine Navy (Team B)
5	FEU (Team B)
6	
7	
8	
9	
10	

== PSL in international competitions ==
=== Thai-Denmark Super League 2016 ===
A selection of the players from the PSL participated in the 2016 Thai-Denmark Super League which was held in Bangkok, Thailand from March 23 to 28, 2016. The team played as the Petron-Philippine Super Liga team and was coached by Petron coach George Pascua. The Petron-PSL All-Stars lost all its group stage matches against Bangkok Glass, Idea Khonkaen and 3BB Nakhonnont. The team won in an exhibition game outside the scope of the tournament against the Hong Kong women's national volleyball team which was also held in Bangkok.

Volleyball Thai-Denmark Super League
Year	Round	Position	W	L
(Thailand) 2016	Preliminary round	7th place	0	3

=== 2016 AVC Asian Women's Club Championship ===
The PSL organized the staging of the 2016 AVC Women's Club Championship under the supervision of Larong Volleyball sa Pilipinas (LVPI). The tournament was held at the Alonte Sports Arena in Biñan from September 3 to September 11, 2016.

The Philippines was represented by the Foton Tornadoes, the champions of the 2015 PSL Grand Prix. The team finished at seventh place.

AVC Women's Club Championship
Year	Round	Position	W	L
(Thailand) 2016	Final round	7th place	2	3

=== 2016 FIVB Women's Club World Championship ===
The PSL organized the staging of the 2016 FIVB Volleyball Women's Club World Championship together with Larong Volleyball sa Pilipinas (LVPI). The tournament was held at the Mall of Asia Arena in Pasay from October 18 to 23, 2016. This was the first hosting by the Philippines.

The Philippines was represented by the Philippine Super Liga All-Stars playing under the name PSL-F2 Logistics Manila and finished at last place (8th).

== Brand ambassador ==
- Mika Reyes

== Broadcast partners ==
- TV5, AksyonTV, Sports5.ph
