= 2016 Philippine Super Liga Invitational Cup =

First indoor conference of the 2016 Philippine Super Liga season

- Duration: February 18 – April 9, 2016
- Teams: 7
- TV partner(s): TV5, AksyonTV, Sports5.ph

Results
- Champions: RC Cola–Army Troopers; Est Cola (co-champions)
- Third place: Petron Tri-Activ Spikers
- Fourth place: Cignal HD Spikers

Awards
- MVP: Jovelyn Gonzaga
- Best OH: Sutadta Chuewulim; Royse Tubino
- Best MB: Aby Maraño; Maica Morada
- Best OPP: Aiza Maizo-Pontillas
- Best Setter: Tichaya Boonlert
- Best Libero: Anisa Yotpinit

PSL Invitational Cup chronology
- < 2013 2017 >

PSL conference chronology
- < 2015 Grand Prix 2016 All-Filipino >
- 2016 BVCC >

The 2016 Philippine Super Liga Invitational Cup (also known as the 2016 PLDT Home Ultera Philippine Super Liga Invitational Cup due to sponsorship reasons) was the first conference of the 2016 season of the Philippine Super Liga (PSL). It was also the second running of the Invitational Conference, with the first being in 2013. The conference ran from February 18 to April 9, 2016, coinciding with the UAAP Season 78 volleyball tournaments.

A major change to the Invitational Conference was the addition of guest teams from other countries. This season, it was Est Cola from Thailand, which joined the final round, clashing against top three teams of the preliminary round for the championship. LVPI Director Jeff Tamayo was the guest speaker of the opening ceremonies, while LVPI President Joey Romasanta and Sports5 head Patricia Bermudez-Hizon attended the awarding ceremonies.

Among member teams, three teams made their departure: the Meralco Power Spikers, Philips Gold Lady Slammers, and RC Cola–Air Force Raiders. Two teams made their debut in the F2 Logistics Cargo Movers and New San Jose Builders Victorias. This conference also marked the return of three-time champions Philippine Army Lady Troopers.

For this conference, the league declared two co-champions. The Philippine Army won their fourth league title alongside guest team Est Cola.

== Format ==
Classification round

- The classification involved the six PSL teams.
- The top three teams advanced to the final round while the remaining teams were eliminated.

Final round

- The final round was also a single round-robin, now featuring the international guest team. Each team played one match against all other teams for a total of three matches.

== Teams ==
2016 Philippine Super Liga Invitational Cup
Abbr.	Team	Affiliation	Head coach	Team captain
Local teams
CIG	Cignal HD Spikers	Cignal TV, Inc.	Sammy Acaylar	Michelle Laborte
F2L	F2 Logistics Cargo Movers	F2 Global Logistics, Inc.	Rosemarie Molit-Prochina	Cha Cruz
FOT	Foton Toplanders	United Asia Automotive Group, Inc.	Vilet Ponce de Leon	Angeli Araneta
NSJ	New San Jose Builders Victorias	New San Jose Builders, Inc.	Michael Molleno	Coleen Laurice Bravo
PET	Petron Tri-Activ Spikers	Petron Corporation	George Pascua	Aiza Maizo-Pontillas
RCC	RC Cola–Army Troopers	ARC Refreshments Corporation	Sgt. Kungfu Reyes	Jovelyn Gonzaga
Guest team
EST	Est Cola	Serm Suk Public Company Ltd.	Chamnan Dokmai	Jarasporn Bundasak

== Classification round ==
Pos	Team	Pld	W	L	Pts	SW	SL	SR	SPW	SPL	SPR	Qualification
1	RC Cola–Army Troopers	6	5	1	16	14	3	4.667	411	314	1.309	Final round
2	Petron Tri-Activ Spikers	6	5	1	16	14	6	2.333	440	392	1.122	Final round
3	F2 Logistics Cargo Movers	6	4	2	12	12	8	1.500	442	416	1.063	Final round
4	Cignal HD Spikers	5	3	2	9	11	8	1.375	424	397	1.068	
5	Foton Toplanders	5	1	4	3	3	13	0.231	327	378	0.865	
6	New San Jose Builders Victorias	6	0	6	0	2	18	0.111	349	496	0.704	

Date	Time		Score		Set 1	Set 2	Set 3	Set 4	Set 5	Total	Report
18 February	16:00	RCC	3–0	FOT	25–17	25–9	25–22			75–48	P2
18 February	18:00	F2L	3–0	NSJ	25–23	25–10	25–4			75–37	Report
20 February	13:00	F2L	0–3	RCC	22–25	12–25	19–25			53–75	Report
20 February	15:00	NSJ	1–3	FOT	16–25	25–23	20–25	17–25		78–98	Report
23 February	16:00	NSJ	0–3	RCC	15–25	20–25	15–25			50–75	P2
23 February	18:00	F2L	3–0	FOT	25–23	25–22	25–19			75–64	P2
08 March	16:00	PET	3–1	CIG	19–25	25–22	25–21	25–21		94–89	Report
08 March	18:00	F2L	3–1	NSJ	25–18	23–25	25–17	25–23		98–83	Report
10 March	16:00	F2L	0–3	PET	14–25	15–25	16–25			45–75	P2
10 March	18:00	NSJ	0–3	CIG	20–25	19–25	18–25			57–75	P2
12 March	13:00	NSJ	0–3	PET	20–25	16–25	8–25			44–75	Report
12 March	15:00	F2L	3–1	CIG	25–18	25–17	21–25	25–22		96–82	Report
15 March	16:00	RCC	3–0	FOT	25–21	25–17	25–23			75–61	Report
15 March	18:00	PET	2–3	CIG	25–18	13–25	19–25	25–20	12–15	94–103	Report
17 March	16:00	RCC	2–3	PET	25–19	27–29	22–25	25–14	12–15	111–102	Report
17 March	18:00	FOT	0–3	CIG	20–25	18–25	18–25			56–75	Report
19 March	13:00	FOT	1–3	PET	25–14	16–25	22–25	7–25		70–89	Report
19 March	15:00	RCC	3–0	CIG	25–16	25–14	25–19			75–49	Report

== Final round ==
Pos	Team	Pld	W	L	Pts	SW	SL	SR	SPW	SPL	SPR	Qualification
1	RC Cola–Army Troopers	3	3	0	9	9	2	4.500	255	238	1.071	Champions
2	Est Cola	3	2	1	6	7	3	2.333	244	182	1.341	Co-champions
3	Petron Tri-Activ Spikers	3	1	2	3	4	7	0.571	227	261	0.870	
4	F2 Logistics Cargo Movers	3	0	3	0	1	9	0.111	198	243	0.815	

Date	Time		Score		Set 1	Set 2	Set 3	Set 4	Set 5	Total	Report
07 April	16:00	F2L	0–3	EST	14–25	15–25	17–25	–	–	46–75	
07 April	18:00	RCC	3–1	PET	25–19	25–23	16–25	25–20	–	91–87	
08 April	16:00	RCC	3–0	F2L	25–21	25–20	25–16	–	–	75–57	
08 April	18:00	PET	0–3	EST	12–25	12–25	23–25	–	–	47–75	
09 April	13:00	PET	3–1	F2L	25–22	26–24	16–25	26–24	–	93–95	
09 April	15:00	RCC	3–1	EST	25–23	25–23	14–25	25–23	–	89–94	

== Final standing ==
Rank	Team
1st place, gold medalist(s)	RC Cola–Army Troopers; Est Cola (co-champion)
3rd place, bronze medalist(s)	Petron Tri-Activ Spikers
4	F2 Logistics Cargo Movers
5	Cignal HD Spikers
6	Foton Toplanders
7	New San Jose Builders Victorias

2016 Philippine SuperLiga Invitational Cup
RC Cola–Army Troopers
1st title (of RC Cola); 4th title (of Philippine Army Lady Troopers)
Team roster

Genie Sabas, Joanne Bunag, Mary Jean Balse-Pabayo (on maternity leave), Tina Salak, Jovelyn Gonzaga (c), Michelle Carolino, Angela Nunag, Honey Royse Tubino, Rachel Daquis, Nerissa Bautista, Christine Agno, Sarah Jane Gonzales, Jeaniie delos Reyes
Head coach
Sgt. Emilio Reyes, Jr.

Est Cola
(co-champion)
Team roster

Anisa Yotpinit, Wipawee Srithong, Chamaipon Phokha, Patcharaporn Sittisad, Tirawan Sang-ob, Sutadta Chuewulim, Sasipaporn Janthawisut, Jarasporn Bundasak (c), Tichaya Boonlert, Sineenat Phocharoen, Parinya Pankaew
Head coach
Chamnan Dokmai

=== Individual awards ===
Award		Name/Team
MVP		(Philippines) Jovelyn Gonzaga (RC Cola–Army)
Best Outside Spiker	1st:	(Thailand) Sutadta Chuewulim (Est Cola)
Best Outside Spiker	2nd:	(Philippines) Honey Royse Tubino (RC Cola–Army)
Best Middle Blocker	1st:	(Philippines) Abigail Maraño (F2 Logistics)
Best Middle Blocker	2nd:	(Philippines) Maica Morada (Petron)
Best Opposite Spiker		(Philippines) Aiza Maizo-Pontillas (Petron)
Best Setter		(Thailand) Tichaya Boonlert (Est Cola)
Best Libero		(Thailand) Anisa Yotpinit (Est Cola)

== Venues ==
- Filoil Flying V Arena (main venue)
- Malolos Sports and Convention Center, Malolos, Bulacan
- Alonte Sports Arena, Biñan, Laguna
- Batangas City Sports Center, Batangas City, Batangas
- Imus Sports Complex, Imus, Cavite

== Broadcast partners ==
- Sports5: TV5, AksyonTV, Hyper (SD and HD), Sports5.ph

=== Broadcast notes for final round ===
Game	Sports5 coverage		
Game	Play-by-play	Analyst	Courtside reporter
F2 Logistics vs. Est Cola	James Velasquez	Denise Tan	Chino Lui-Pio
RC Cola–Army vs. Petron	Anthony Suntay	Chiqui Pablo	Chino Lui-Pio
RC Cola–Army vs. F2 Logistics	Anthony Suntay	Tex Suter	Mich del Carmen
Petron vs. Est Cola	Chiqui Reyes	Chiqui Pablo	Mich del Carmen
Petron vs. F2 Logistics	James Velasquez	Denise Tan	Carla Lizardo
RC Cola–Army vs. Est Cola	James Velasquez	Tex Suter	Carla Lizardo
