= Women's Volleyball Pro Challenge =

Women's Pro Challenge
- Current season, competition or edition: 2017 Women's Volleyball Pro Challenge
- Sport: Volleyball
- Founded: 2011
- First season: 2011
- Administrator: Thai Volleyball Co., Ltd
- No. of teams: 7
- Country: Thailand
- Confederation: AVC
- Most recent champions: Rangsit University (2nd title)
- Most titles: Rangsit University (2 titles)
- Level on pyramid: 2
- Promotion to: Thailand League
- Website: thaivolleyball.co.th

Women's Volleyball Pro Challenge (Thai: วอลเลย์บอลหญิงโปรชาเลนจ์) is the second-tier professional league in Thai domestic volleyball tournament. The top 2 are promoted to Women's Volleyball Thailand League at the end of the season. Seasons run from July to September, with teams playing 6 games each. Most games are played on Saturdays and Sundays, with a few games played on weekdays.

== Pro Challenge clubs ==
There are 7 clubs in the league, with two relegated teams from Thailand League.

=== Members ===
Club	Province	2016–17 season
Bangkok Sport	Bangkok	—N/a
Cosmo Chiang Rai	Chiang Rai	—N/a
Rajamangala Thanyaburi	Pathum Thani	—N/a
Rangsit University	Pathum Thani	TL Eighth place
Samut Prakan	Samut Prakan	—N/a
Suphan Buri	Suphan Buri	—N/a
Volly	Bangkok	—N/a

== Results summary ==
Season	Champions	Runners-up	Third place
2011	Nakhonnont	Sisaket	Suan Sunandha
2012	Samut Prakan	Sisaket	Suan Sunandha
2013	Suan Sunandha	Udonthani	Bangkok
2014	Bangkok Glass	Bangkok	Maejo University
2015	King-Bangkok	Thai-Denmark Nongrua	Maejo Town Municipality
2016	Not held		
2017	Rangsit University	Cosmo Chiang Rai	Suphan Buri
2018	Opart 369	Rangsit University	Sao Meung Nont
2019	Diamond Food VC	Rangsit University	Bangkok
2020	Rangsit University	Metro TNSU Chonburi VC	Samut Prakan VC

=== Titles by team ===
Club	Titles	Years won
Rangsit University	2	2017, 2020
Diamond Food VC	1	2019
Opart 369	1	2018
King-Bangkok	1	2015
Bangkok Glass	1	2014
Suan Sunandha	1	2013
Samut Prakan	1	2012
Nakhonnont	1	2011

== See also ==
- Women's Volleyball Thailand League
- Volleyball Thai-Denmark Super League
