= Sineenat Phocharoen =

Thai volleyball player

Personal information
- Full name: Sineenat Phocharoen
- Nickname: Film
- Nationality: Thai
- Born: 19 May 1995 (age 31); Samut Prakan, Thailand
- Height: 1.74 m (5 ft 9 in)
- Weight: 74 kg (163 lb)
- Spike: 287 cm (113 in)
- Block: 270 cm (106 in)

Volleyball information
- Position: Opposite Hitter
- Current club: Nakornnonthaburi
- Number: 14

National team
| 2014–2016 | Thailand |

Sineenat Phocharoen (Thai: สินีนาฏ โพธิ์เจริญ; born 19 May 1995) is a Thai volleyball player. She is a member of the Thailand women's national volleyball team.

== Clubs ==
- (Thailand) Samut Prakan (2012–2013)
- (Thailand) Sisaket (2013–2015)
- (Thailand) Thai-Denmark Nongrua (2015–2017)
- (Thailand) King-Bangkok (2018)
- (Thailand) 3BB Nakornnont (2018–2019)

== Awards ==
=== Clubs ===
- 2013–14 Thailand League - Runner up, with Sisaket
- 2016 PSL Invitational Cup - Co-champion, with Est Cola
- 2018–19 Thailand League - Third, with 3BB Nakornnont
- 2019 Thai–Denmark Super League - Third, with 3BB Nakornnont

== National team ==
=== U23 team ===
- 2015 Asian Championship - Silver Medal
