= Team Est Cola (women) =

Thailand volleyball club

Est Cola
- Flag of Thailand, used in the jersey uniform. The team is represented by the Est Cola soft drink brand logo.
- Full name: Team Est Cola
- Short name: Est Cola
- Head coach: Wanna Buakaew

Team Est Cola (stylized as est or EST; Thai: ทีมเอสโคล่า) is a Thailand-based women's volleyball team named after the Thai cola soft drink of the same name. The team represents Thailand in tournaments hosted by other countries, usually fielding squads mostly composed of younger players.

== History ==
Thai Drinks Co the marketer of Est Cola which was produced by Sermsuk Plc has been sponsoring the national volleyball teams program of Thailand for both men and women since 2015.

Est Cola would join the 2016 Invitational Cup of the Philippine Super Liga as a guest team, and had a bye to that tournament's final round. They dominated the final round which had a round robin format, having rendered their final match with RC Cola-Army Troopers as a de facto final. Army defeated Est Cola, but both teams were still declared co-champions.

The team played at the 2018 VTV9 – Binh Dien International Women's Volleyball Cup in Vietnam finishing fifth. Est also took part in the of KOVO Cup in South Korea of the same year.

Est Cola returns to Philippine volleyball, as a guest team for the 2024 Invitational Conference of the Premier Volleyball League (PVL). The team is composed of Thai under-20 players.

Est Cola participated in 2025 VTV International Women's Volleyball Cup in Vietnam. The team is composed of Thai under-21 players plus players from senior team: Kuttika Kaewpin who is also served as team captain, Natthimar Kubkaew, Wiranyupa Inchan. Kuttika Kaewpin left the team in the middle of tournament to join national team for the week 3 of 2025 FIVB Women's Volleyball Nations League.

The team once again return to the PVL as a guest team at the 2026 Invitational Conference. Unlike the 2024 PVL squad which featured youth players, the 2026 squad included players with experience in the senior Thailand national team. Wanna Buakaew coached the team. Kantima Aekpatcha served as team caption leading younger players. However she suffered from an ankle injury on the first game and saw limited roles the remaining of the tournament. They defeated the Nxled Chameleons in the final of the conference.

== Current roster ==
The following is Est Cola's roster for the 2026 Premier Volleyball League Invitational Conference.

- Kantima Aekpatcha (OH) (Team Captain)
- Serah Ankomah (S)
- Chuleeporn Ritwiset (MB)
- Sasithorn Jatta (MB)
- Waruni Kanram (MB)
- Nannaphat Moonjakham (OP)
- Jiratcha Naoprachun (L)
- Supawadee Panwilai (OH)
- Papatchaya Phontham (OP)
- Natnicha Saelao (S)
- Wisaruta Sengna (OH)
- Nirarach Srikutta (OH)
- Nichakorn Wansuk (L)
- Nattharika Wasan (MB)

== Honors ==
=== Team ===
| Season | Conference | Title | Source |
|---|---|---|---|
| 2016 | PSL Invitational Cup | Co-champion | |
| 2018 | VTV9 – Binh Dien International Women's Volleyball Cup | 5th place | |
| 2024 | PVL Invitational Conference | 4th place | |
| 2025 | VTV International Women's Volleyball Cup | 5th place, Fair Play Prize | |
| 2026 | PVL Invitational Conference | Champion | |

=== Individual ===
| Season | Conference | Award | Name | Source |
|---|---|---|---|---|
| 2016 | PSL Invitational Cup | 1st Best Outside Spiker | Sutadta Chuewulim | |
| 2016 | PSL Invitational Cup | Best Setter | Tichaya Boonlert | |
| 2016 | PSL Invitational Cup | Best Libero | Anisa Yotpinit | |
| 2024 | PVL Invitational Conference | Best Libero | Kalyarat Khamwong | |
| 2026 | PVL Invitational Conference | Most Valuable Player, Best Opposite Spiker | Papatchaya Phontham | |
