= Patcharee Deesamer =

Thai indoor volleyball player (born 1989)

Personal information
- Full name: Patcharee Deesamer
- Nickname: Fai
- Nationality: Thailand
- Born: February 3, 1989 (age 37); Surin, Thailand
- Height: 1.80 m (5 ft 11 in)
- Weight: 74 kg (163 lb)
- Spike: 306 cm (120 in)
- Block: 293 cm (115 in)

Volleyball information
- Position: Middle Blocker
- Current club: Thai-Denmark Nongrua
- Number: 7

Career
Years	Teams
2007–2013	Idea Khonkaen
2014–2015	Sisaket
2015–2016	Thai-Denmark Nongrua

National team
Thailand

Patcharee Deesamer (Thai: พัชรีย์ ดีเสมอ, born March 2, 1989, in Surin) is a Thai indoor volleyball player. She is a current member of the Thailand women's national volleyball team.

== Awards ==
=== Individuals ===
- 2011–12 Thailand League "Best Blocker"

=== Clubs ===
- 2012–13 Thailand League - Champion, with Idea Khonkaen
- 2013 Thai-Denmark Super League - Champion, with Idea Khonkaen
