= Narumon Khanan =

Thai volleyball player (born 1983)

Personal information
- Nickname: Jeab
- Nationality: Thailand
- Born: January 26, 1983 (age 43); Chuen Chom, Maha Sarakham, Thailand
- Height: 1.80 m (5 ft 11 in)
- Weight: 66 kg (146 lb)
- Spike: 311 cm (122 in)
- Block: 289 cm (114 in)

Volleyball information
- Position: Setter
- Current club: 3BB Nakornnont
- Number: 7

National team
2001–2009	Thailand
Honours
Women's volleyball
Representing Thailand
Asian Championship
Bronze medal – third place	2007 Nakhon Ratchasima	Team
Asian Cup Championship
Bronze medal – third place	2008 Nakhon Ratchasima	Team
Southeast Asian Games
Gold medal – first place	2003 Hanoi	Team
Gold medal – first place	2005 Manila	Team
Gold medal – first place	2007 Nakhon Ratchasima	Team
Gold medal – first place	2009 Vientiane	Team

Narumon Khanan (Thai: นฤมล ขานอัน, RTGS: Naruemon Khan-an; born January 26, 1983, in Maha Sarakham) is a Thai indoor volleyball. She is a member of the Thailand women's national volleyball team.

== Career ==
Narumon is 1.80 m (5 ft 11 in) tall and plays as a setter. She played with the Thai club Udonthani for the 2012–13 season.

== Club ==
- (Turkey) Yesilyurt (2008–2009)
- (Thailand) Udonthani (2012–2013)
- (Thailand) Sisaket (2013–2015)
- (Thailand) 3BB Nakornnont (2015–2019)

== Awards ==
=== Club ===
- 2018 Thai–Denmark Super League - Third, with 3BB Nakornnont
- 2018–19 Thailand League - Third, with 3BB Nakornnont
- 2019 Thai–Denmark Super League - Third, with 3BB Nakornnont

=== National team ===
- 1998 Princess Cup - Champion
- 2000 Princess Cup - Champion
- 2001 Summer Universiade - Bronze Medal
- 2001 Asian Championship - Bronze Medal
- 2002 Princess Cup - Champion
- 2002 Asian Junior Championship - Runner-Up

== Royal decoration ==
- 2010 - Commander (Third Class) of The Most Admirable Order of the Direkgunabhorn
