= Pleumjit Thinkaow =

Thai volleyball player

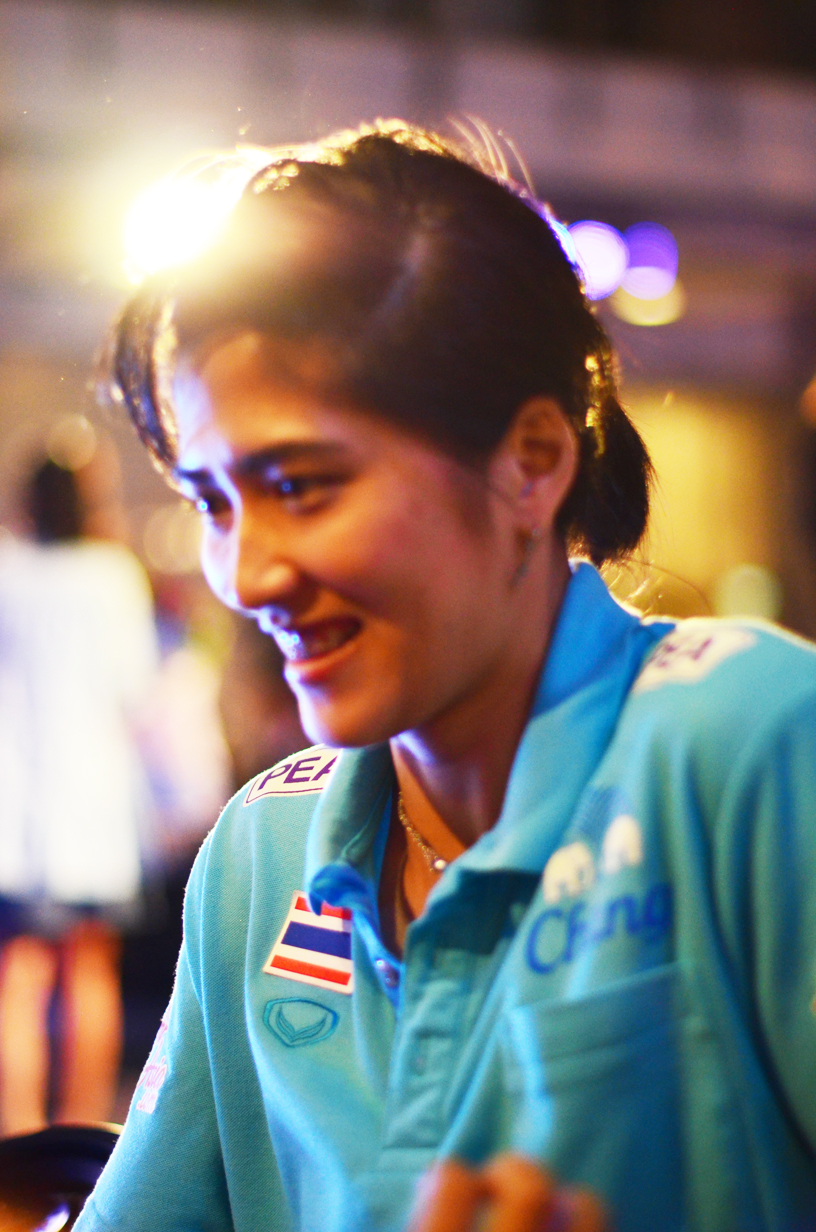

Personal information
- Full name: Pleumjit Thinkaow
- Nickname: Nhong, Ningnhong
- Nationality: Thai
- Born: 9 November 1983 (age 42); Chaiyo, Ang Thong, Thailand
- Hometown: Bangkok, Thailand
- Height: 1.80 m (5 ft 11 in)
- Weight: 63 kg (139 lb)
- Spike: 303 cm (119 in)
- Block: 293 cm (115 in)

Volleyball information
- Position: Middle blocker
- Current club: Supreme Chonburi
- Number: 5

National team
2001–2021 (21 years)	Thailand
Honours
Women's volleyball
Representing Thailand
Summer Universiade
Bronze medal – third place	2001 Beijing	Team
Montreux Volley Masters
Silver medal – second place	2016 Switzerland
Asian Games
Silver medal – second place	2018 Jakarta/Palembang	Team
Bronze medal – third place	2014 Incheon	Team
Asian Championship
Gold medal – first place	2009 Hanoi
Gold medal – first place	2013 Nakhon Ratchasima
Silver medal – second place	2017 Biñan
Silver medal – second place	2019 Seoul
Bronze medal – third place	2001 Nakhon Ratchasima
Bronze medal – third place	2007 Nakhon Ratchasima
Bronze medal – third place	2015 Tianjin
Asian Cup
Gold medal – first place	2012 Almaty
Silver medal – second place	2010 Taicang
Bronze medal – third place	2008 Nakhon Ratchasima
Bronze medal – third place	2016 Vĩnh Phúc
Bronze medal – third place	2018 Nakhon Ratchasima
ASEAN Grand Prix
Gold medal – first place	2019 Nakhon Ratchasima	Team
Southeast Asian Games
Gold medal – first place	2001 Kuala Lumpur	Team
Gold medal – first place	2003 Hanoi	Team
Gold medal – first place	2005 Manila	Team
Gold medal – first place	2007 Nakhon Ratchasima	Team
Gold medal – first place	2009 Vientiane	Team
Gold medal – first place	2011 Jakarta/Palembang	Team
Gold medal – first place	2013 Naypyidaw	Team
Gold medal – first place	2015 Singapore	Team
Gold medal – first place	2017 Kuala Lumpur	Team
Gold medal – first place	2019 Philippines	Team
- Last updated: October 2017

Pleumjit Thinkaow (Thai: ปลื้มจิตร์ ถินขาว; RTGS: Pluemchit Thinkhao; born 9 November 1983) is a Thai volleyball player.

She was a member of the Thailand women's national volleyball team. Her international debut was at the 21st SEA Games in Malaysia.

== Personal life ==
Pleumjit grew up in a sport-loving family in Angthong (a province about 100 km. north of Bangkok), having an elder brother. Her parents are civil servants. Before she started playing volleyball, she was into table tennis. She switched to volleyball following her father's advice that volleyball was more fun and more likely to become popular. Afterwards, a volleyball coach of Bodindecha (Sing Singhaseni) School in Bangkok was so impressed by her playing that he brought her to the school during her high-school level. At first, she did not play as a middle blocker but an outside hitter.

Pleumjit was first capped for the national junior team in 2000. A year later, she was chosen to join the national team when she was 17 years old. and She went to play professional volleyball overseas for the first time in China for a month when she was 19 years old.

Pleumjit got her bachelor's degree and master's degree in Business Administration from Rattana Bundit University Bangkok.

== Career ==
Thinkaow won the 2013–14 Azerbaijani Super League Bronze Medal 3–0 to Azerrail Baku and she won the Best Spiker award. She ranked fifth in the 2010 Club World Championship with Federbrau and also ranked fifth in the 2011 Club World Championship playing with Chang. In the 2016 Club World Championship she ranked seventh with Bangkok Glass.

For the 2017 season, she played on loan with the Thai club Supreme Chonburi.

In 2018 she played with the local Supreme Chonburi on loan.

She is on the list 2019 Korea-Thailand all star super match competition.

Pleumjit retired at the age of 37, after the 2021 FIVB Volleyball Women's Nations League.

== Clubs ==
- (Thailand) BEC World (2002-2005)
- (Thailand) Rattana Bundit University (2002–2005)
- (China) Huanghe (2004)
- (Russia) Aurum (2005–2006)
- (Thailand) Bangkok (2006)
- (Thailand) Sang Som (2006)
- (Vietnam) Vital Thai Binh (2006–2007)
- (Turkey) Ereğli Belediye (2007–2010)
- (Thailand) Federbrau (2009–2011)
- (Thailand) Supreme Nakhonsi (2009–2013)
- (China) Fujian Xi Meng Bao (2010–2012)
- (Thailand) Chang (2011–2012)
- (Thailand) PEA Sisaket (2011–Present)
- (Azerbaijan) Igtisadchi Baku (2012–2014)
- (Thailand) Supreme Chonburi (2013–2014)
- (Thailand) Bangkok Glass (2014–2018)
- (Thailand) Supreme Chonburi (2018–Present)
- (Vietnam) Binh chủng Thông tin - Trường Tươi Bình Phước (2024) (loan)

== Awards ==
=== Individuals ===
- 2006 Thailand League – "Best Middle Blocker"
- 2007 Asian Championship – "Best Blocker"
- 2007 Asian Club Championship – "Best Server"
- 2013 FIVB World Grand Champions Cup – "Best Middle Blocker"
- 2013–14 Azerbaijan Super League – "Best Spiker"
- 2014–15 Thailand League – "Best Middle Blocker"
- 2015 Thai-Denmark Super League – "Most Valuable Player"
- 2015 Asian Championship – "Best Middle Blocker"
- 2015 Asian Club Championship – "Most Valuable Player"
- 2015–16 Thailand League – "Best Middle Blocker"
- 2015–16 Thailand League – "Most Valuable Player"
- 2016 Asian Club Championship – "Best Middle Blocker"
- 2017 VTV Binh Dien International Cup – "Best Middle Blocker"
- 2017 Asian Club Championship – "Best Middle Blocker"
- 2016–17 Thailand League – "Best Middle Blocker"
- 2017–18 Thailand League – "Best Middle Blocker"
- 2018–19 Thailand League – "Best Middle Blocker"
- 2020 Thailand League – "Best Middle Blocker"

=== Clubs ===
- 2010–11 Chinese League D.2 – Champion, with Fujian Xi Meng Bao
- 2011–12 Thailand League – Runner-up, with Supreme Nakhonsi
- 2012–13 Azerbaijan Super League – Runner-up, with Igtisadchi Baku
- 2014–2015 Thailand League – Champion, with Bangkok Glass
- 2015 Thai-Denmark Super League – Champion, with Bangkok Glass
- 2015–16 Thailand League – Champion, with Bangkok Glass
- 2016 Thai–Denmark Super League – Champion, with Bangkok Glass
- 2016–17 Thailand League – Runner-up, with Bangkok Glass
- 2018–19 Thailand League – Runner-up, with Supreme Chonburi
- 2019 Thai–Denmark Super League – Champion, with Supreme Chonburi
- 2020 Thailand League – Champion, with Supreme Chonburi
- 2007 Asian Club Championship – Runner-up, with Sang Som
- 2008 Asian Club Championship – Runner-up, with Sang Som
- 2009 Asian Club Championship – Champion, with Federbrau
- 2010 Asian Club Championship – Champion, with Federbrau
- 2011 Asian Club Championship – Champion, with Chang
- 2012 Asian Club Championship – Bronze medal, with Chang
- 2015 Asian Club Championship – Champion, with Bangkok Glass
- 2016 Asian Club Championship – Bronze medal, with Bangkok Glass
- 2017 Asian Club Championship – Champion, with Supreme Chonburi
- 2018 Asian Club Championship – Champion, with Supreme Chonburi
- 2019 Asian Club Championship – Runner-up, with Supreme Chonburi

=== Master of ceremonies ===
Television

- 20 : ทุกวัน เวลา น.-น. ทางช่อง () ร่วมกับ

Online

- 20 : วิลาพาทัวร์ Ep2 ทางช่อง YouTube:PJ STORY
- 2021 : ทางช่อง YouTube:pleumwila

== Royal decorations ==
- 2013 - Commander (Third Class) of The Most Exalted Order of the White Elephant
- 2010 - Commander (Third Class) of The Most Admirable Order of the Direkgunabhorn
- 2005 - Member (Fifth Class) of The Most Admirable Order of the Direkgunabhorn
