= 2016 PSL season =

The 2016 PSL season may refer to:

- 2016 Pakistan Super League
- 2016 Philippine Super Liga season
