= Sommai Niyompon =

Thai volleyball player (born 1984)

Personal information
- Nationality: Thailand
- Born: 28 September 1984 (age 42)
- Height: 1.72 m (5 ft 8 in)

Volleyball information
- Position: Outside hitter
- Current club: Thai-Denmark Nongrua
- Number: 5

National team
- Years: Team
- 2001–2002: Thailand

Sommai Niyompon (Thai: สมหมาย นิยมพล, born 28 September 1984) is a retired Thai female volleyball player, who played as a wing spiker.

She was part of the Thailand women's national volleyball team at the 2002 FIVB Volleyball Women's World Championship in Germany. On club level she played with Thai-Denmark Nongrua.

== Clubs ==
- (Thailand) Pepsi Bangkok (2002)
- (Thailand) SCG Khonkaen (2011-2012)
- (Thailand) Thai-Denmark Nongrua (2016–2017)
