= Jeff Tamayo =

Filipino taekwondo practitioner

Col. Antonio "Jeff" De Lara Tamayo is a Filipino sport executive and taekwondo instructor.

Tamayo was the chef-de-mission of the Philippine delegation to the 27th SEA Games in Myanmar in 2013. He is the second vice president of the Philippine Olympic Committee and board of director of Larong Volleyball sa Pilipinas, Inc. (LVPI). Tamayo served as overall security officer of the 28-man Philippine contingent in the 2016 Summer Olympics in Rio de Janeiro, Brazil.

Since 2004, he was the president of the Philippine Soft Tennis Association and in 2007 president of the Southeast Asian Soft Tennis Federation. He was a silver medalist in 1982 in the Asian Taekwondo Championships in Singapore. He was the taekwondo coach of the Philippine Military Academy from 1983 to 1992 and a coach to Ali Atienza and Bea Lucero. He is a ranking colonel in the Philippine Air Force and a former commanding chief of the Presidential Escorts group used for former president Joseph Estrada and former vice president Teofisto Guingona.
