= Gullapa Piampongsan =

Thai volleyball player (born 1991)

Personal information
- Full name: Gullapa Piampongsan
- Nickname: Kul
- Nationality: Thai
- Born: March 17, 1991 (age 35); Rayong, Thailand
- Height: 1.78 m (5 ft 10 in)
- Weight: 60 kg (132 lb)
- Spike: 280 cm (110 in)
- Block: 274 cm (108 in)

Volleyball information
- Position: Setter
- Current club: (Thailand) Supreme TIP Chonburi-E.Tech
- Number: 21 (National team), 29 (Club)

National team
| 2018–2021 | Thailand |

Kullapa Piampongsan (Thai: กุลภา เปี่ยมพงษ์สานต์, born 11 February 1989 in Rayong) is a Thai indoor volleyball player. She is a member of the Thailand women's national volleyball team.

== Career ==
She was awarded Best Setter.

In 2018 she played with the local Supreme Chonburi on loan.

She is on the list 2019 Korea-Thailand all star super match competition.

== Clubs ==
- (Thailand) Nonthaburi (2011–2014)
- (Thailand) King-Bangkok (2015–2016)
- (Thailand) Khonkaen Star (2017–2019)
- (Thailand) Diamond Food (2019–2023)
- (Vietnam) Than Quảng Ninh VC (2024) (loan)
- (Thailand) Supreme TIP Chonburi-E.Tech (2024–present)

== Awards ==
=== Individuals ===
- 2018–19 Thailand League – "Best Setter"

=== Club ===
- 2018 Asian Club Championship – Champion, with Supreme Chonburi
- 2023 Asian Club Championship – Runner-up, with Diamond Food–Fine Chef
