= New San Jose Builders Victorias =

- Full name: New San Jose Builders Victorias
- Founded: 2016
- Dissolved: 2016
- Manager: Erwin S. Pineda
- Captain: Coleen Laurice Bravo (UPHSD)
- League: Philippine Super Liga; Premier Volleyball League
- 2016 Invitational: 6th place

The New San Jose Builders Victorias were a women's volleyball team in the Philippines owned by New San Jose Builders, a real estate firm. The team competed in the Philippine Super Liga (PSL) and competed in just one conference: the 2016 Invitational Cup. The team was mostly composed of players originating from the Perpetual Lady Altas with reinforcements from the DLSU-D Patriots and EAC Lady Generals.

For the succeeding indoor conference, the team partnered with Sonia Trading, Inc. (distributor of Amy's Kitchen food products) and played as Amy's Kitchen-Perpetual.

== Honors ==
=== Team ===
Season	Conference	Title	Source
2016	Invitational	6th place	

== See also ==
- Amy's Kitchen-Perpetual
