= Philippine Soft Tennis Association =

The Philippine Soft Tennis Association is the national governing body for Soft Tennis in the Philippines. It is accredited by the International Soft Tennis Federation which is the governing body for the sport of Soft Tennis in the world.
