= Khonkaen International Convention and Exhibition Center =

Convention center in Khon Kaen, Thailand

- Interactive map of Khonkaen International Convention and Exhibition Center
- Address: 222 Moo 12 Mittraphap Road, Mueang Kao, Mueang Khon Kaen, Khon Kaen, Thailand
- Location: Khon Kaen, Thailand
- Coordinates: 16.4000093°N 102.8150699°E
- Operator: CP Land
- Public transit: Tesco Lotus LRT Station (from 2020)

Construction
- Opened: December 2017

Website
- www.kice-center.com

Khonkaen International Convention and Exhibition Center (KICE) (Thai: ศูนย์ประชุมและแสดงสินค้านานาชาติขอนแก่น) is a convention center and exhibition hall in Khon Kaen, Thailand. It was built by CP Land, with an investment of almost 2 billion baht (60 million USD). The center is expected to help raise Khon Kaen's profile as a MICE (Meetings, incentives, conferencing, exhibitions) destination, a move promoted by the Thailand Convention and Exhibition Bureau.
