= Nongrua Women's Volleyball Club =

Thai volleyball club

Thai-Denmark Nongrua
- Full name: Thai-Denmark Nongrua
- Short name: Nongrua
- Founded: 2015
- Dissolved: 2017
- Ground: Khon Kaen University Gymnasium; Khonkaen, Thailand
- Chairman: (Thailand) Samnao Pookla-ao
- Head coach: (Thailand) Banjong Sombat
- League: Thailand League
- 2015–2016: 7th place

Uniforms
Home	Away

Thai-Denmark Nongrua was a female professional volleyball team based in Khonkaen, Thailand. The club was founded in 2015 and played in the Women's Volleyball Thailand League.

== Honours ==
- Pro Challenge
  - Runner-up (1): 2015

== Former names ==
- Prior to 2015 : Nongruawittaya School
- 2015 – 2017 : Thai-Denmark Nongrua

== Notable players ==
Domestic Players

Thailand

- Malika Kanthong
- Chitaporn Kamlangmak
- Thitapa Tongsidee
- Phiangphit Sankaew
- Chidawan Anandamrongchai
- Nokyoong Paowana
- Patcharee Sangmuang
- Kanittha Juangjan
- Irada Poldon
- Thitima Seehorkaew
- Porntida Sawatdirak
- Sukhumarn Penboon
- Thanita Niyompon
- Cholthicha Rachwongsa
- Jidapa Kaiyasit
- Hathairat Jarat
- Tanaporn Noosatsung
- Suthida Mingmitwan
- Panadda Thasalee
- Jurairat Ponlaka
- Suluckana Pantong
- Sopit Juabloi
- Sineenat Phocharoen
- Kaewta Noramart
