= Sisaket Women's Volleyball Club =

Thai volleyball club

EUREKA - Sisaket
- Full name: EUREKA - Sisaket
- Nickname: Sisaket (ลำดวนพิฆาต)
- Founded: 2012
- Ground: Wee Sommai Gymnasium; Sisaket, Thailand (Capacity: 4,000)
- Chairman: (Thailand) Montree Onon
- Head coach: (Thailand) Pornchai Thatheesa
- League: Thailand League

Uniforms
Home	Away

Sisaket (Thai: สโมสรวอลเลย์บอลศรีสะเกษ) was a female professional volleyball team based in Sisaket, Thailand. In the past, Tapaphaipun Chaisri served as team captain.

== Honours ==
- Thailand League :
  - Runner-up : 2013–14
- Thai-Denmark Super League :
  - Third : 2014

== Former squad ==
2014–2015 Team
No.	Name	Date of birth	Height (m)	Position
1	(Thailand) Anisa Yotpinit	23 June 1998	1.64	libero
3	(Thailand) Sineenat Phocharoen	19 May 1995	1.74	opposite
4	(Thailand) Sukhumarn Penboon	30 March 1990	1.71	libero
6	(Thailand) Chitaporn Kamlangmak	17 March 1996	1.86	middle blocker
7	(Thailand) Narumon Khanan	20 January 1983	1.80	opposite
9	(Thailand) Arisa Promnok	9 October 1997	1.68	outside hitter
10	(Thailand) Jurairat Ponleka	6 October 1991	1.81	setter
12	(Thailand) Tapaphaipun Chaisri	29 November 1989	1.68	outside hitter
13	(Thailand) Alisa Sengsane (C)	10 October 1984	1.78	outside hitter
14	(Thailand) Kanittha Juangjan	16 January 1998	1.75	outside hitter
15	(Thailand) Patcharee Deesamer	3 January 1989	1.80	middle blocker
17	(Thailand) Phiangphit Sankaew	14 July 1991	1.73	setter
18	(Thailand) Utaiwan Kaensing	7 September 1988	1.89	middle blocker

2013–2014 Team
No.	Name	Date of birth	Height (m)	Position
3	(Thailand) Sineenat Phocharoen	19 May 1995	1.74	opposite
6	(Thailand) Jurairat Ponleka	6 October 1991	1.81	setter
7	(Thailand) Narumon Khanan	20 January 1983	1.80	opposite
10	(Thailand) Jutarat Montripila	2 October 1986	1.75	outside hitter
11	(Thailand) Pornpun Guedpard	5 May 1993	1.72	setter
12	(Thailand) Tapaphaipun Chaisri (C)	29 November 1989	1.68	outside hitter
14	(Thailand) Piyatida Lasungnern	23 October 1990	1.74	opposite
15	(Thailand) Tikamporn Changkeaw	12 December 1984	1.68	libero
16	(Thailand) Patcharee Deesamer	3 January 1989	1.80	middle blocker
17	(Thailand) Phiangphit Sankaew	14 July 1991	1.73	setter
18	(Thailand) Utaiwan Kaensing	7 September 1988	1.89	middle blocker

2012–2013 Team
No.	Name	Date of birth	Height (m)	Position
1	(Thailand) Anisa Yotpinit	23 June 1998	1.64	libero
4	(Thailand) Sirintra Srisuma	14 October 1988	1.73	outside hitter
7	(Thailand) Narumon Khanan	20 January 1983	1.80	opposite
12	(Thailand) Jarunee Sannok	4 January 1981	1.80	outside hitter
14	(Thailand) Piyamas Koijapo (C)	23 October 1978	1.78	outside hitter
15	(Thailand) Pattama Mansuwan	2 July 1986	1.80	outside hitter
12	(Thailand) Thipvimon Pookongnam	4 July 1989	1.74	setter
17	(Thailand) Kamonporn Sukmak	29 February 1988	1.72	setter
18	(Thailand) Khwanjira Yuttagai	1 September 1986	1.78	middle blocker
19	(Thailand) Yaowalak Mahaon	20 June 1989	1.74	outside hitter

== Notable players ==
Domestic Players

- (Thailand) Jarunee Sannok
- (Thailand) Piyamas Koijapo
- (Thailand) Khwanjira Yuttagai
- (Thailand) Pornpun Guedpard
- (Thailand) Jutarat Montripila
- (Thailand) Tikamporn Changkeaw
- (Thailand) Utaiwan Kaensing
- (Thailand) Anisa Yotpinit
- (Thailand) Jurairat Ponleka
- (Thailand) Phiangphit Sankaew
- (Thailand) Patcharee Deesamer
- (Thailand) Kanittha Juangjan
- (Thailand) Alisa Sengsane
- (Thailand) Tapaphaipun Chaisri
- (Thailand) Chitaporn Kamlangmak
- (Thailand) Narumon Khanan
- (Thailand) Sineenat Phocharoen
