= Quezon City Pride Council =

Agency overview
- Formed: March 2013; 13 years ago
- Jurisdiction: Quezon City, Metro Manila, Philippines
- Agency executive: Socrates Topacio, Chairperson

Quezon City Pride Council (QCPC) is a council created for the purpose of enforcing LGBT rights and gender-based policies and programs for LGBT individuals in Quezon City, Philippines. Formed in March 2013, it is the first of its kind in the Philippines. The Quezon City Pride Council (QCPC) was formed to oversee the integration of all city programs and projects for the LGBT community.

The QCPC was created through an office order during the term of Mayor Herbert Bautista and was formally launched on March 25, 2013. The council is composed of notable individuals who promote and advocate for LGBT rights in different industries and professions. Some of the council's members are also members of the local government.

== Projects ==
Shortly after its creation in March 2013, QCPC launched the month-long World Pride Festival in August 2013 to promote LGBT awareness. Planned activities included a clean-up drive, an art exhibit, an LGBT summit, the In QCity Independent Film Festival, and a World Pride March, slated for December 7th of that year. However, the event was cancelled due to Typhoon Haiyan.

=== Health ===
In partnership with the City Health Office, the Pride Council successfully conducted the HIV/AIDS Seminar and Orientation in the 142nd barangay of Quezon City.

=== Awareness ===
The QCPC held an international day against homophobia and transphobia, in partnership with the Office of the Mayor and Vice Mayor, the Association of Transgender People in the Philippines, and other LGBT organizations in the country. More than 300 individuals, mostly transgender men and women, participated.

The QCPC participated in the National Conference and Meeting on Sexual Orientation, Gender Identity, and Expression (SOGIE) and HIV/AIDS training in Butuan City from August 7 to 10, 2014. Chaired by Direk Soxie Topacio, the QCPC Team presented the mission, vision, and core values of the Pride Council on the second day. Erwin Joselito Ulanday also discussed the projects and advocacies of the Pride Council since its conception, and Jeffklein Glodove promoted the upcoming events, highlighting the QCPC Pride March and International Pink Festival.

=== Environmental Activism ===
In partnership with the Environment Protection and Waste Management Department, LGBT organizations, and private individuals, a clean-up drive dubbed “Ilog mo, Irog Ko, Buhay Ko” ("Your river, My river, My life") was held at Barangay Masambong, District 1, Quezon City, in celebration of Environment Month in June.
