= Opart 369 Volleyball Club =

Thai volleyball club

Opart 369
- Full name: Opart 369 Volleyball Club
- Founded: 2018
- Ground: Nontaburi
- Chairman: (Thailand) Ronnarit Mongkonrat
- Head coach: (Thailand) Pollawat Toomanee
- League: Thailand League
- 2018–19: 6th place

Uniforms
Home	Away

Opart 369 is a female professional volleyball team based in Nonthaburi Thailand. The club was founded in 2018 and plays in the

== Honours ==
=== Domestic competitions ===
- Women's Volleyball Pro Challenge
  - Champion (1) : 2018

== Former names ==
- Opart 369 (2018–present)

== Team colors ==
Thailand League

- (2018–present)

Thai-Denmark Super League

- (2018–present)

== League results ==
League		Position	Teams	Matches	Win	Lose
Thailand League	2018–19	6	8	14	3	11
Thailand League	2019–20	8	8	7	0	7

== Team roster 2019–20 ==
No.	Player	Position	Date of birth	Height (m)	Country
1	Amitchaya Sridet	Middle blocker	3 April 2001 (age 24)	1.77	Thailand
2	Thitapa Thongsidee	Setter	4 February 1996 (age 30)	1.73	Thailand
3	Tharinee Timtae	Libero	19 October 1996 (age 29)	1.60	Thailand
4	Pairin Mesenai	Outside hitter	18 July 2001 (age 24)	1.70	Thailand
6	Rujiraporn Phawanna	Middle blocker	6 January 1999 (age 27)	1.75	Thailand
7	Pinyada Thopo	Outside hitter	18 October 2004 (age 21)	1.71	Thailand
8	Siriyakorn Aupradit	Middle blocker	31 March 1998 (age 27)	1.79	Thailand
9	Somsuda Maimun	Middle blocker	13 July 2001 (age 24)	1.75	Thailand
10	Orrasa Pinitduang	Setter	14 August 1997 (age 28)	1.65	Thailand
12	Chompunuch Chitsabai	Opposite	23 September 1999 (age 26)	1.76	Thailand
13	Sasitorn Pimpa	Setter	8 October 1994 (age 31)	1.68	Thailand
14	Nattaya Khangkadsa	Middle blocker	7 October 1997 (age 28)	1.71	Thailand
16	Kantima Aekkpatcha	Outside hitter	7 November 1998 (age 27)	1.75	Thailand
17	Anisa Yotpinit	Libero	23 June 1998 (age 27)	1.63	Thailand
18	Prapatsorn Kongudom	Outside hitter	20 July 2000 (age 25)	1.68	Thailand
19	Arisa Promnok (c)	Outside hitter	9 October 1997 (age 28)	1.65	Thailand
20	Sunisa Kongsui	Outside hitter	6 July 1999 (age 26)	1.76	Thailand
21	Tamonwan Bunrueang	Middle blocker	15 September 2003 (age 22)	1.74	Thailand

== Head coach ==
Season	Name
2018–2019	(Thailand) Pollawat Toomanee

== Team Captain ==
- (Thailand) Arisa Promnok (2018–Present)

== Notable players ==
Domestic Players

Thailand

- Sutina Pasang
- Yuwalee Choksamai
- Phitchayaphak Dokkulab
- Sumalai Prasopsuk
- Pannapa Chanpuk
