= 2019 Women's Volleyball Thai-Denmark Super League =

Tournament details
- Host country: MCC Hall of The Mall Bangkapi Bangkok, Thailand
- Dates: 19–23 March 2019
- Teams: 6
- Venue: 1 (in 1 host city)

Final positions
- Champions: Supreme Chonburi-E.Tech (3rd title)

Tournament awards
- MVP: (Indonesia) Aprilia Santini Manganang

2019 Women's Volleyball Thai-Denmark Super League (Thai: วอลเลย์บอลหญิงไทยเดนมาร์คซูเปอร์ลีก 2019) was the 7th edition of the tournament. It was held at the MCC Hall of The Mall Bangkapi in Bangkok, Thailand 19–23 March 2019.

== Foreign players ==
Women's Thai-Denmark Super League foreign players
Team	Player 1	Player 2	Player 3
Supreme Chonburi-E.Tech	(China) Wang Na (AVC)	(China) Zhang Xiaoya (AVC)	(Indonesia) Aprilia Santini Manganang (AVC)
Nakhon Ratchasima The Mall	(Japan) Mai Okumura (AVC)	(Turkey) Yeliz Başa (CEV)	—N/a
Quint Air Force	(Vietnam) Trần Thị Bích Thủy (AVC)	—N/a	—N/a
Thai-Denmark Khonkaen Star	(Brazil) Paula Ilisandra (CSV)	—N/a	—N/a
Opart 369	—N/a	—N/a	—N/a
3BB Nakornnont	(Hong Kong) Yeung Sau-Mei (AVC)	—N/a	—N/a

== Pools composition ==
Pool A	Pool B
Nakhon Ratchasima The Mall; 3BB Nakornnont; Quint Air Force	Supreme Chonburi-E.Tech; Thai-Denmark Khonkaen Star; Opart 369

== Preliminary round ==
=== Pool A ===
Pos	Team	Pld	W	L	Pts	SW	SL	SR	SPW	SPL	SPR	Qualification
1	Nakhon Ratchasima The Mall	2	2	0	6	6	0	MAX	156	114	1.368	Semifinals
2	3BB Nakornnont	2	1	1	3	3	3	1.000	112	133	0.842	Semifinals
3	Quint Air Force	2	0	2	0	0	6	0.000	118	157	0.752	

Date	Time		Score		Set 1	Set 2	Set 3	Set 4	Set 5	Total	Report
19 Mar	16:00	Nakhon Ratchasima The Mall	3–0	3BB Nakornnont	25–17	25–16	25–21			75–54	
20 Mar	16:00	Nakhon Ratchasima The Mall	3–0	Quint Air Force	25–18	25–13	31–29			81–60	
21 Mar	16:00	Quint Air Force	0–3	3BB Nakornnont	24–26	14–25	20–25			58–76	

=== Pool B ===
Pos	Team	Pld	W	L	Pts	SW	SL	SR	SPW	SPL	SPR	Qualification
1	Supreme Chonburi-E.Tech	2	2	0	6	6	1	6.000	173	135	1.281	Semifinals
2	Thai-Denmark Khonkaen Star	2	1	1	3	4	4	1.000	179	180	0.994	Semifinals
3	Opart 369	2	0	2	0	1	6	0.167	134	171	0.784	

Date	Time		Score		Set 1	Set 2	Set 3	Set 4	Set 5	Total	Report
19 Mar	18:30	Supreme Chonburi-E.Tech	3–1	Thai-Denmark Khonkaen Star	25–21	23–25	25–14	25–23		98–83	
20 Mar	18:45	Supreme Chonburi-E.Tech	3–0	Opart 369	25–15	25–15	25–22			75–52	
21 Mar	18:45	Opart 369	1–3	Thai-Denmark Khonkaen Star	25–21	17–25	19–25	21–25		82–96	

== Final round ==
Semifinals
22 March
Nakhon Ratchasima The Mall	3
Thai-Denmark Khonkaen Star	0
22 March
Supreme Chonburi-E.Tech	3
3BB Nakornnont	0

Final
23 April
Nakhon Ratchasima The Mall	1
Supreme Chonburi-E.Tech	3

=== Semifinals ===
Date	Time		Score		Set 1	Set 2	Set 3	Set 4	Set 5	Total	Report
22 Mar	16:15	Nakhon Ratchasima The Mall	3–0	Thai-Denmark Khonkaen Star	25–18	25–16	25–19			75–53	
22 Mar	18:45	Supreme Chonburi-E.Tech	3–0	3BB Nakornnont	25–20	25–23	25–17			75–60	

=== Final ===
Date	Time		Score		Set 1	Set 2	Set 3	Set 4	Set 5	Total	Report
23 Mar	15:30	Nakhon Ratchasima The Mall	1–3	Supreme Chonburi-E.Tech	21–25	22–25	25–22	22–25		90–97	

== Final standing ==
Rank	Team
1st place, gold medalist(s)	Supreme Chonburi-E.Tech
2nd place, silver medalist(s)	Nakhon Ratchasima The Mall
3rd place, bronze medalist(s)	3BB Nakornnont
3rd place, bronze medalist(s)	Thai-Denmark Khonkaen Star
5	Opart 369
5	Quint Air Force

== See also ==
- 2019 Men's Volleyball Thai-Denmark Super League
