= Mai Okumura =

Japanese volleyball player (born 1990)

Personal information
- Nationality: Japanese
- Born: October 31, 1990 (age 35) Nagato, Yamaguchi, Japan

Sport
- Sport: Volleyball

Mai Okumura (奥村麻依, born October 31, 1990) is a Japanese volleyball player. She plays for the Japan women's national volleyball team. She competed at the 2020 Summer Olympics, in Women's volleyball.

She competed at the 2019 FIVB Volleyball Nations League.
