= Bangkok Women's Volleyball Club =

Thai volleyball club

Bangkok กรุงเทพ
- Full name: King-Bangkok
- Nickname: Angel capital
- Founded: 2005
- Ground: Pracha Niwet Sport Center; Bangkok, Thailand (Capacity: 3,800)
- Chairman: (Thailand) Anucha Srirungruang
- Head coach: (Thailand) Suwat Jeerapan
- League: Thailand League
- 2018–2019: 7th place

Uniforms
Home	Away

King-Bangkok is a female professional volleyball team based in Bangkok, Thailand. The club was founded in 2005 and plays in the Thailand league.

== Honours ==
- Thailand League
  - Champion (1): 2008–09
- Academy League U18 Thailand League
  - Champion (1): 2016
  - Third (1): 2017

== Former names ==
- Bangkok (2005–2015)
- King-Bangkok (2015– )

== Current squad ==
As of November 2018

Number	Player	Position	Height (m)	Weight (kg)	Birth date
3	(Thailand) Nattida Krongchuen	Middle Blocker	1.85		22 August 2000 (age 25)
4	(Thailand) Chayanee Daengmeaka	Opposite	1.67	60	22 April 2000 (age 25)
6	(Thailand) Chutimon Sagorn	Opposite	1.71	53	2 October 1998 (age 27)
7	(Thailand) Chanakan Wongyapan	Middle Blocker	1.77	66	3 July 1997 (age 28)
10	(Thailand) Orrasa Pinitduang	Setter	1.68	64	14 August 1997 (age 28)
12	(Thailand) Nattaya Khangkhadsa	Middle Blocker	1.74	64	1 October 1997 (age 28)
13	(Thailand) Phanapha Chanpook	Middle Blocker	1.73		3 February 2000 (age 26)
17	(Thailand) Siriyakorn Aupradit	Middle Blocker	1.82	69	17 January 1998 (age 28)
18	(Thailand) Prapatsorn Kongudom	Wing Spiker	1.68		20 July 2000 (age 25)
19	(Thailand) Arisa Promnok	Outside Hitter	1.68	50	9 October 1997 (age 28)
20	(Thailand) Suthina Pasang	Outside Hitter	1.69		28 October 1999 (age 26)
	(Thailand) Alisa Sengsane	Outside Hitter	1.78		10 October 1984
	(Thailand) Kanjana Kuthaisong	Outside Hitter	1.71	58	14 April 1997

== Notable players ==
Domestic Players

Thailand

- Pleumjit Thinkaow
- Piyanut Pannoy
- Rattanaporn Sanuanram
- Patcharee Sangmuang
- Sasipaporn Janthawisut
- Sontaya Keawbundit
- Thidarat Pengwichai
- Wiriya Songmuang
- Leelawan Sukkod
- Sirintra Srisuma
- Nittaya Duangpila
- Tanaporn Nusatsung
- Katsara Jittikul
- Thirada Sukwattanapon
- Kannika Krayom
- Sumalai Prasopsuk
- Duenpen Areelue
- Siriporn Sooksen
- Phitchayapak Doklularb
- Nattaporn Seelakhet
- Sumalai Prasopsook
- Kullapa Piampongsan
- Khwanjira Yuttagai
- Nithiwan Malert
- Waraporn Poomjarern
- Anisa Yotpinit
- Natthanicha Jaisaen
- Sineenat Phocharoen
