= Est Cola =

Soft drink from Thailand

Est
- Type: Cola
- Manufacturer: Sermsuk Public Company Limited
- Origin: Thailand
- Introduced: 2012; 14 years ago
- Website: www.sermsukplc.com/brand/est

Est (stylized as est; Thai: เอส) Cola is a cola soft drink from Thailand, manufactured by Sermsuk Public Company Limited. It was launched on 2 November 2012.

== History ==
Est Cola was created following the termination of the company's contract with PepsiCo, for whom it had bottled and distributed Pepsi in Thailand since 1952. The Pepsi-Sermsuk split created an opportunity for Coca-Cola to become the leading soda brand in the country. PepsiCo had 48% market shares in Thailand before the split (and Coca-Cola 42%), but its shares dropped to 15% after the split. The split happened after PepsiCo tried and failed to take over Sermsuk.

In 2014, ThaiBev acquired Est Cola from Sermsuk for THB1.56 billion (US$ 48 million). Sermsuk remained the manufacturer of the cola.

== Involvement in sports ==
In 2013, Est signed a two-year partnership with Manchester City F.C. to use the club's image for advertising purposes in Thailand.

Est has been sponsoring the Thailand national volleyball teams both men and women since 2015. A Thai womens' volleyball team baring the soda's name, Est Cola has also been formed which participates in international club tournaments.
