= Tichaya Boonlert =

Thai indoor volleyball player

Personal information
- Nickname: Woon
- Nationality: Thailand
- Born: February 14, 1997 (age 29) Nonthaburi, Thailand
- Height: 1.79 m (5 ft 10 in)
- Weight: 60 kg (132 lb)
- Spike: 291 cm (115 in)
- Block: 283 cm (111 in)

Volleyball information
- Position: Setter
- Current club: Hóa chất Đức Giang Hà Nội

National team
- Years: Team
- 2015–2022: Thailand
Honours
Women's volleyball
Representing Thailand
Asian Championship
Silver medal – second place	2017 Biñan	Team
Asian Cup Championship
Bronze medal – third place	2016 Vinh Phuc	Team
U23 Asian Championship
Silver medal – second place	2015 Pasig	Team
Silver medal – second place	2017 Nakhon Ratchasima	Team

Tichaya Boonlert (Thai: ฑิชาญา บุญเลิศ, born February 14, 1997, in Nonthaburi) is a Thai indoor volleyball player. She is a current member of the Thailand women's national volleyball team. With her team PSL F2 Logistics Manila she competed at the 2016 FIVB Women's Club World Championship.

== Career ==
Boonlert won silver medal with her U23 national team during the 2015 Asian U23 Asian Championship and the bronze medal at the 2016 Asian Cup Championship.

== Clubs ==
- (Thailand) 3BB Nakornnont (2012–2022)
- (Philippines) PSL Manila (2016)
- (Vietnam) Hóa chất Đức Giang (2023–present)

== Awards ==
=== Individuals ===
- 2014 PEA Junior Championship – "Most Valuable Player"
- 2014–15 Thailand League – "Best Setter"
- 2016 PSL Invitational Cup – "Best Setter"
