= Larong Volleyball sa Pilipinas =

Larong Volleyball sa Pilipinas, Inc.
- Sport: Volleyball
- Abbreviation: LVPI
- Founded: 2015
- Headquarters: PhilSports Complex, Pasig
- President: Peter Cayco
- Secretary: Ariel Paredes
- (Philippines)

Larong Volleyball sa Pilipinas, Inc. (lit. Volleyball Sport in the Philippines) was the national sport association for volleyball in the Philippines between 2015 and January 2021. It was recognized by the Philippine Olympic Committee (POC), the Philippine Sports Commission (PSC), the Asian Volleyball Confederation (AVC) and provisionally recognized by the International Volleyball Federation (FIVB). In 2021, the newly formed Philippine National Volleyball Federation became recognized by the POC, AVC and FIVB as the national sport association for volleyball in the Philippines.

== History ==
=== Formation ===
Larong Volleyball sa Pilipinas, Inc. (LVPI) was formed in a restructuring effort by the Philippine Olympic Committee (POC) through their president Peping Cojuangco following a power struggle which emerged at the formerly POC-recognized Philippine Volleyball Federation (PVF) due to two colliding factions between the group of PVF president Edgardo "Boy" Cantada and the group of PVF secretary general Karl Chan and PVF managing director Otie Camangian, but it was later reconciled and united.

LVPI was formed together with four of the Manila-based major stakeholders - the UAAP, the NCAA, the Shakey's V-League/Spikers' Turf (under Sports Vision Management Group, Inc.) and the Philippine Super Liga (under SportsCore Events Management). Provincial stakeholders were purportedly snubbed for joining the LVPI due to current alignment with the PVF.

The POC withdrew its recognition of the PVF when it learned that there were two registrations with the Securities and Exchange Commission under the same name (the old 2005 recognition and the updated 2014 recognition).

LVPI was incorporated by POC 1st vice-president, Team Philippines Chef de mission for the 2016 Rio Olympics and Asian Volleyball Confederation Board Member Joey Romasanta, POC (and University of Perpetual Help System) official Ret. Army Col. Jeff Tamayo, POC legal counsel Atty. Ramon Malinao, POC official Marine B/Gen. Benjamin "Chippy" Espiritu, and former Ateneo de Manila University athletics director and Sports Vision president Ricky Palou with the intent of replacing PVF as the national sport association for volleyball in the Philippines. The POC received a letter dated January 27, 2014, from the FIVB indicating that it is giving provisional membership to the newly formed LVPI. The FIVB required LVPI to hold an election not before February 15, 2015.

LVPI was introduced to the public during the opening day of the 2015 season of the Philippine Super Liga and also during the drawing of the lots for the 2015 Asian U23 Women's Volleyball Championship last March 6, 2015, despite the backlash by the current PVF president Cantada against the forming of the new volleyball NSA by the POC. Cantada claimed that the PVF is still the recognized NSA for volleyball in the country, and that the withdrawal of the recognition of the PVF by the POC is illegal and not due process.

Romasanta, together with former Philippine Amateur Volleyball Association (PAVA, the predecessor of the PVF) president Victorico "Concoy" Chaves, leads the executive board of LVPI, together with Palou, Ariel Paredes, Tamayo, Peter Cayco, Ramon "Choy" Cojuangco Jr., and Sherwin Malonzo, among others in the presence of AVC secretary general Shanrit Wongsaprert and AVC development and marketing chairman Ramon Suzara. The first order of business for the group after their formal recognition to the AVC, is the payment of the 3 million peso debt ($80,000 from FIVB and $10,000 from Thailand Volleyball Association) of the former PAVA administration (under Roger Banzuela, which Palou and Suzara were members of the PAVA board) to the FIVB during the Manila's hosting of the 2005 Grand Prix.

On April 23, 2015, the PVF filed a temporary restraining order and petition for preliminary mandatory injunction against the LVPI citing the group's "malicious intent" against the PVF. A decision was set to be issued before the end of the year.

In a meeting held last May 12, 2015, presided by FIVB President Ary Graca, the FIVB officially gave its full recognition to the LVPI as the legitimate and exclusive authority for volleyball in the Philippines (without given time to the general assembly), Former FIVB and AVC president Wei Jizhong was part in witnessing the formation and given recognition for LVPI by the international governing bodies.

On July 29, 2015, the POC issued its letter of recognition to the LVPI as regular member of the local Olympic body in compliance to the requirements of the Membership and Accreditation Committee.

=== Developments ===
LVPI sent different teams (with different players compositions and coaches) to represent the Philippines in all competitions within 2015 (except the Asian Men's Seniors where they backed out due to lack of funds), including the Asian Men's U23 and Asian Women's U23, Asian's Women's Seniors, 2015 SEA Games (comeback after 10 years) and the 2015 VTV Cup, which the PVF's Amihan and Bagwis program have planned to play before the LVPI intervened. Those teams were disbanded by the LVPI management due to its poor performance in the competitions. The organization also supported the Cignal HD Spikers and Petron Blaze Spikers on their stints in the 2015 Asian Men's and Women's Club Volleyball Championships.

LVPI has partnered with the Philippine Marines 7th Marine Brigade (Reserve) to organize volleyball clinics in South Cotabato, Sultan Kudarat and Sitangkai, Tawi-Tawi towards peace and development but it is under drawing stages. In October 2015, LVPI together with the FIVB conducted a level 2 coaching seminar instructed by course director Shanwen Zhao of China and course instructor Razieh “Samira” Seifzadeh of Iran at the Arellano University Gym, attended by 12 volleyball coaches, including Oliver Almadro of Ateneo Men's Team and Kung Fu Reyes of the UST and Philippine Army Women's teams as preparation for the formation of the coaches commission to be headed by LVPI board member Ramon Malinao. In December 2015, the LVPI also sent four representatives, Anna Tomas, Kyle Principe, Abac Cordero and Marc Anthony Reyes, to the inaugural AVC Press Seminar held in Bangkok, Thailand.

Among its plans for 2016 were the formation of the commissions for coaches, referees and the athletes and looking for private sponsors to fund the national team and other projects within the scope of LVPI. The organization also focused on the formation of the permanent national team training pool that will restrict players (initially, from 19 years old below - for the Asian U19 and possibly, the FIVB U19 championships) for playing in too many leagues and exhibition games, this will be patterned to the Gilas Cadets program of the SBP and the expansion of their activities to the provinces. Eventually, some of the U19 players will compete also in the 2017 SEA Games and the Asian Seniors. President Romasanta confirmed that the PSL will support the formation of the national pool. It will also use the Arellano University Gym in Pasay, as their main office (from its original location in POC office in Pasig) and the national training center for the LVPI-formed national volleyball teams. It will also serve as a venue for different events and seminars for referees and coaches. LVPI has also appointed managing director Benjamin Espiritu to oversee the adjustments in the volleyball calendar between the four stakeholders of the federation starting in 2016.

Top LVPI officials Romasanta, Palou, Cayco and Suzara went to the AVC Congress 2015 in Riyadh, Saudi Arabia in November 2015 to formally seal the hosting rights of the 2016 Asian Women's Club Volleyball Championships in Manila and the appointment of Romasanta as the board member, and re-election of Suzara as the Development and Marketing Chairman. AVC has also offered the hosting rights to the Philippines for the 2017 Asian Seniors Women's Volleyball Championship.

In 2016, the BEST Center's Women's Volleyball League was officially accredited as a stakeholder of LVPI. Also in the same year, the Beach Volleyball Republic officially gets pivotal support from the organization after the successful staging of its Nationwide Tour, the National Championships and the Invitationals held in Anguib Beach, Cagayan in June 2016.

=== Controversies ===
In a board meeting held in July 2015, LVPI secretary-general Ricky Palou was cited and accused of misrepresenting himself as LVPI President in documents submitted to the FIVB and AVC. In these documents, he sought permission from both bodies to form a beach volleyball tournament without the consent of LVPI board. He was also accused of sealing deals with Solar Sports to cover this event, again without the knowledge and consent of the LVPI board. Palou also insisted on sending the Ateneo Lady Eagles in the 28th SEA Games, instead of the newly formed team with players from 4 stakeholders (as approved by Romasanta). He also instigated the protest against Indonesia's April Manganang over claims of being a hermaphrodite. Palou was also responsible in sending the wrong team roster sent to the Asian Women's Senior Championships in May 2015, as well as the appointments of Roger Gorayeb and Nes Pamiliar as coaches, replacing Thai coach Anusorn Bundit, for the national team in the 2015 VTV Cup, again without the permission of the board. In a caucus, Palou pointed out his assistant Sherwin Malonzo as responsible to the mess. The LVPI board has since decided to honor the deal brokered between Palou and Solar Sports in order to avoid facing legal charges.

In October 2015, PVF President Cantada, condemned the act of the LVPI and Score (headed by Ramon Suzara, the president of PSL, and one of the masterminds in the withdrawal of recognition of PVF in the POC, AVC, and FIVB) over the incident involving 12 imports of the Philippine Super Liga Grand Prix who have gone through the immigration process and play in the league without any necessary working permits and other documents for foreigners who will work in the country. He also criticized LVPI and Suzara for blatant disregard and abuse of the Philippine immigration and labor laws over the incident.

In October 2016, the LVPI was retained as the National Sports Association for Volleyball in the Philippines as the FIVB started their probe on the expulsion of the PVF, which is one of the main topics of the 35th FIVB World Congress in Buenos Aires, Argentina. The results of the investigation will be released in two years' time during the 37th FIVB World Congress, according to LVPI President Romasanta. Vice President Peter Cayco represented LVPI in the event.

== Officials ==
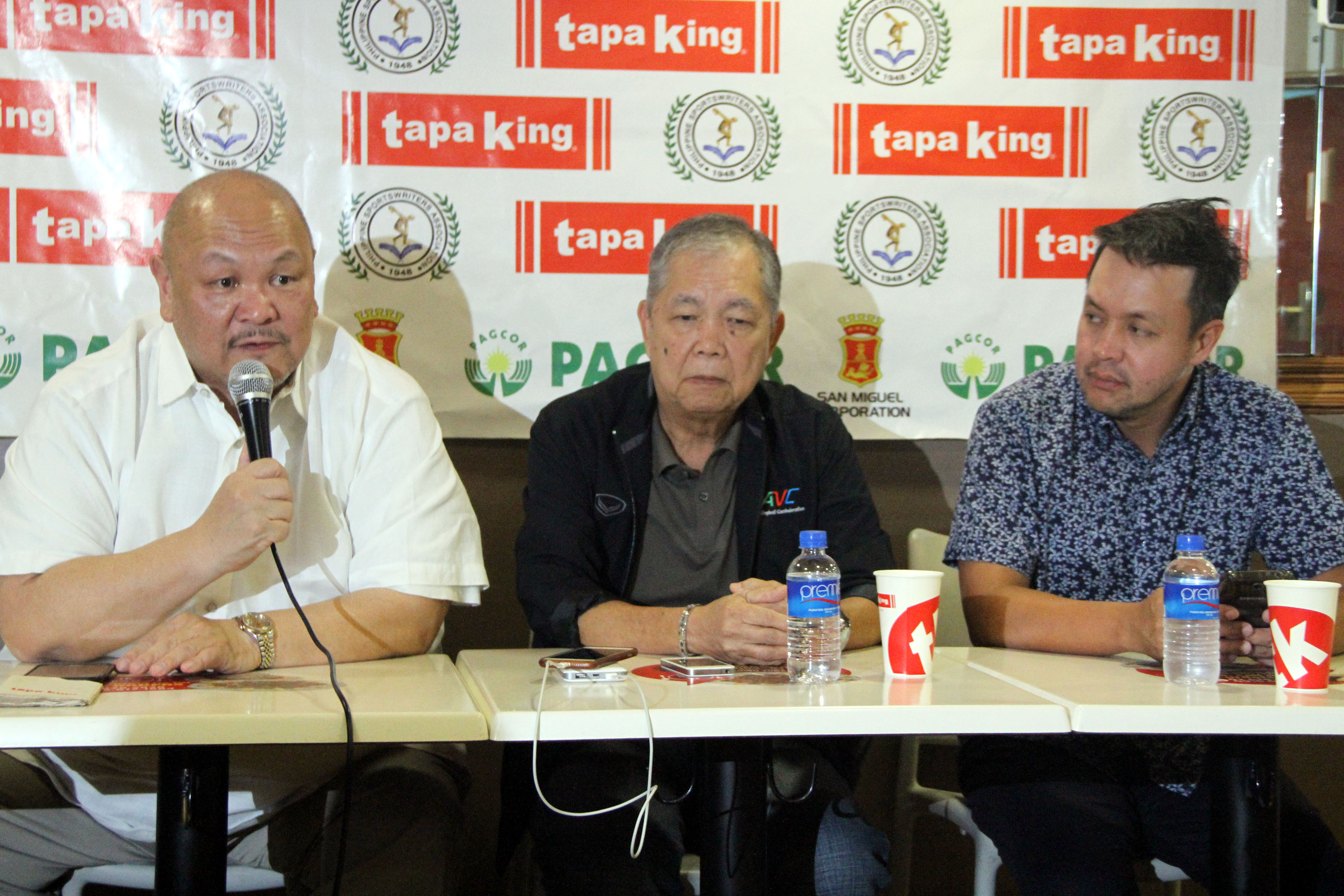
LVPI officials attending the Philippine Sportswriters Association (PSA) Forum on August 7, 2018. From left to right: President Peter Cayco, Vice President Joey Romasanta, and Board Member and PSL Vice President Ian Laurel.

Elected last August 2, 2018.

- President – Peter Cayco (NCAA)
- Chairman – Bemjamin Espiritu (POC)
- Vice President – Joey Romasanta (POC)
- Secretary General - Ariel Paredes (PSL)
- Treasurer – Jeff Tamayo (NCAA)
- Board Members –
  - Rodrigo Roque (UAAP)
  - Ian Laurel (PSL)
  - Ramon Malinao (POC)

== Handled and sanctioned events ==
- 2015 Asian U23 Women's Volleyball Championship (May 1–9, 2015) - rated excellent by the AVC
- 2015 POC-PSC Philippine National Games Volleyball (July 3–9, 2015)
- Fit To Hit: Philippine Beach Volleyball Invitational (September 25–27, 2015, for officiating purposes)
- FIVB Level 2 Coaching Course and Seminar (October 2015, Arellano University Gym)
- 2015 Spike For Peace Women’s International Beach Volleyball (November 27 – December 4, 2015, for technical aspects of the game)
- 2015 Beach Volleyball Republic Christmas Open (December 19–20, 2015)
- 2015 PSC Laro't Saya Play N' Learn Volleyball Championship (December 27, 2015)
- 2016 BEST Center Women's Volleyball League (January–February 2016)
- 2016 Beach Volleyball Republic Invitational Tournament (June 9–12, 2016)
- 2016 Asian Women's Club Volleyball Championship (September 3–11, 2016) (with Philippine Super Liga)
- 2016 FIVB Volleyball Women's Club World Championship (October 18–23, 2016) (with Philippine Super Liga)
- 2017 Asian Women's Volleyball Championship (August 9–17, 2017)
- 2018 FIVB Beach Volleyball World Tour Manila Open (May 3–6, 2018)

== See also ==
- FIVB
- Asian Volleyball Confederation
- Philippine Volleyball Federation
