= Anisa Yotpinit =

Thai volleyball player (born 1998)

Anisa Yodpinit

Personal information
- Full name: Anisa Yodpinit
- Nickname: Namwan
- Nationality: Thai
- Born: June 23, 1998 (age 28); Ratchaburi, Thailand
- Height: 1.62 m (5 ft 4 in)
- Weight: 58 kg (128 lb)

Volleyball information
- Position: Libero
- Current club: Opart 369
- Number: 17

National team
2014–2016	U18 Thailand
2014–2018	U20 Thailand
2015–2017	U23 Thailand
Honours
Women's volleyball
Representing Thailand
Asian Junior Championship
Bronze medal – third place	2016 Nakhon Ratchasima	Team
Asian U23 Championship
Silver medal – second place	2015 Pasig	Team
Silver medal – second place	2017 Nakhon Ratchasima	Team
Asian Youth Championship
Silver medal – second place	2014 Nakhon Ratchasima	Team

Anisa Yotpinit (Thai: อนิสา ยอดพินิจ, born June 23, 1998, in Ratchaburi) is a Thai indoor volleyball player. She is a current member of the Thailand women's national volleyball team.

== Career ==
Anisa played with the club Sisaket for the 2012–13 season.

== Clubs ==
- (Thailand) Sisaket (2012–2013)
- (Thailand) Suan Sunandha (2013–2014)
- (Thailand) Sisaket (2014–2015)
- (Thailand) Bangkok (2015–2018)
- (Thailand) Opart 369 (2018–2019)
- (Thailand) Diamond Food (2020)
- (Thailand) Pro Flex VC (2020-2021)

== Awards ==
=== Individuals ===
- 2015 PEA Junior Championship - "Best Libero"
- 2016 PSL Invitational Cup - "Best Libero"

== National team ==
=== U23 team ===
- 2015 Asian Championship - Silver Medal
- 2017 Asian Championship - Silver Medal

=== U20 team ===
- 2016 Asian Championship - Bronze Medal

=== U18 team ===
- 2014 Asian Championship - Silver Medal
