= List of Philippine Super Liga conference results =

The Philippine Super Liga conference results presents the final rankings of each conference in PSL, a commercial volleyball league in the Philippines founded in 2013.

== Women's division ==
Season	Conference	1st	2nd	3rd	4th	5th	6th	7th	8th	9th	10th
2013	Invitational	TMS–Army	Cignal	Petron	Cagayan Valley	PLDT	PCSO	—N/a			
2013	Grand Prix	TMS–Army	Cignal	PLDT	Cagayan Valley	Petron	RC Cola	—N/a			
2014	All-Filipino	Generika–Army	RC Cola–Air Force	PLDT	AirAsia	Petron	Cagayan Valley	Cignal	—N/a		
2014	Grand Prix	Petron	Generika	RC Cola–Air Force	Cignal	Foton	Mane 'n Tail	—N/a			
2015	All-Filipino	Petron	Shopinas.com	Philips Gold	Foton	Cignal	Mane 'n Tail	—N/a			
2015	Grand Prix	Foton	Petron	Philips Gold	Cignal	Meralco	RC Cola–Air Force	—N/a			
2016	Invitational (Note: Two teams were declared co-champions of this conference.)	RC Cola–Army Est Cola	—N/a	Petron	F2 Logistics	Cignal	Foton	San Jose Builders	—N/a		
2016	All-Filipino	F2 Logistics	Foton	RC Cola–Army	Petron	Generika	Cignal	Standard Insurance–Navy	Amy's Kitchen–Perpetual	—N/a	
2016	Grand Prix	Foton	Petron	F2 Logistics	RC Cola–Army	Generika	Cignal	—N/a			
2017	Invitational	KSWU Cignal	—N/a	Petron	Foton	Generika–Ayala	Cocolife	Sta. Lucia	—N/a		
2017	All-Filipino	Petron	F2 Logistics	Cignal	Foton	Cocolife	Sta. Lucia	Generika–Ayala	Cherrylume	—N/a	
2017	Grand Prix	F2 Logistics	Petron	Foton	Cocolife	Cignal	Sta. Lucia	Generika–Ayala	Iriga City	Victoria Sports–UST	—N/a
2018	Grand Prix	Petron	F2 Logistics	Foton	Cocolife	Sta. Lucia	Cignal	Generika–Ayala	Smart	—N/a	
2018	Invitational	F2 Logistics	Petron	Cignal	Smart–Army	Generika–Ayala	Sta. Lucia	Foton	UP–United Auctioneers	UE–Cherrylume	Cocolife
2018	All-Filipino	Petron	F2 Logistics	Generika–Ayala	Cignal	Foton	Smart	Cocolife	Sta. Lucia	—N/a	
2018	Collegiate Grand Slam	UP	UST	UE	FEU	DLSU-D	CSA-Biñan	—N/a			
2019	Grand Prix	Petron	F2 Logistics	PLDT	Cignal	United VC	Generika–Ayala	Foton	Sta. Lucia	—N/a	
2019	All-Filipino	F2 Logistics	Cignal	Petron	Foton	Generika–Ayala	PLDT	Sta. Lucia	Marinerang Pilipina	—N/a	
2019	Invitational	F2 Logistics	Petron	Cignal	Foton	PLDT	Sta. Lucia	Generika–Ayala	Marinerang Pilipina	—N/a	

== Men's division ==
Season	Conference	1st	2nd	3rd	4th	5th
2013	Grand Prix	PLDT	Systema	Maybank	Giligan's	—N/a
2014	All-Filipino	PLDT–Air Force	Cignal	Systema	IEM	Via Mare
2014	Grand Prix	Cignal	PLDT–Air Force	Fourbees Cavite	Maybank	Bench–Systema

== Beach Volleyball Challenge Cup ==
=== Women's division ===
Season	1st	2nd	3rd	4th	5th	6th	7th	8th	9th	10th	11th	12th	13th	14th
2015	Giligan's	Foton Tornadoes	Cignal (B)	Foton Hurricanes	Meralco	Petron XCS	Amy's Kitchen	Philips Gold	Petron Sprint 4T	Accel Quantum Plus (B)	Beneco	Accel Quantum Plus (A)	Cignal (A)	—N/a
2016	RC Cola–Army (A)	Foton Toplanders	FEU–Petron	Petron XCS	F2 Logistics	Standard Insurance–Navy (A)	RC Cola–Army (B)	Petron Sprint 4T						Mapúa (Note: The team withdrew from the tournament/conference.)
2017	Petron Sprint 4T	Generika–Ayala (A)	Petron XCS	Sta. Lucia	Cignal (A)	Cignal (B)	UPHSD	Cocolife	Generika–Ayala (B)	F2 Logistics (B)	Foton	F2 Logistics (A)	—N/a	
2018	Petron XCS	Sta. Lucia (A)	Generika–Ayala (A)	F2 Logistics	Foton	Cignal (A)	Sta. Lucia (B)	Cignal (B)	—N/a					
2019	Petron XCS	Sta. Lucia–Santorini	Sta. Lucia–Woodside	Petron Sprint 4T	Generika–Ayala (A)	United VC (A)	F2 Logistics	Cignal (A)	—N/a					
2021	Abanse Negrense (A)	Sta. Lucia (A)	Abanse Negrense (B)	Sta. Lucia (B)	F2 Logistics	United Auctioneers	Toby's Sports	Kennedy Solar Energy	—N/a					

=== Men's division ===
Season	1st	2nd	3rd	4th	5th	6th	7th	8th	9th	10th
2015	SM By The Bay (A)	Champion Infinity (B)	Cignal (A)	CenterStage Family KTV	Cignal (B)	Champion Infinity (A)	UPHSD–Molino (A)	IEM	UPHSD–Molino (A)	SM By The Bay (B)
2016	Philippine Navy (A)	Team Volleyball Manila	FEU (A)	Philippine Navy (B)	FEU (B)					
2017	Generika–Ayala	Cignal	SM By The Bay	UPHSD						—N/a
2018	Foton	Sands SM By The Bay	Smart	Cignal					—N/a	
2019	Cignal	Foton	Philippine Army	EAC						
