= List of Philippine Super Liga award recipients =

This is a list of Philippine Super Liga awards for indoor volleyball.

== Most Valuable Player ==
=== Women's ===
Season	Conference	Player	Position	Country of birth	Team
2013	Invitational	Venus Bernal	OH	Philippines	Cignal HD Spikers
2013	Grand Prix	Wanitchaya Luangtonglang	OH	Thailand	TMS-Philippine Army Lady Troopers
2014	All-Filipino	Tina Salak	S	Philippines	Generika-Philippine Army Lady Troopers
2014	Grand Prix	Alaina Bergsma	OPP	United States	Petron Blaze Spikers
2015	All-Filipino	Rachel Daquis	OH	Philippines	Petron Blaze Spikers
2015	Grand Prix	Lindsay Stalzer	OPP	United States	Foton Tornadoes
2016	Invitational	Jovelyn Gonzaga	OPP	Philippines	RC Cola-Army Troopers
2016	All-Filipino	Dawn Macandili	L	Philippines	F2 Logistics Cargo Movers
2016	Grand Prix	Jaja Santiago	MB	Philippines	Foton Tornadoes
2017	Invitational	Jovelyn Gonzaga	OPP	Philippines	Cignal HD Spikers
2017	All-Filipino	Aiza Maizo-Pontillas	OPP	Philippines	Petron Blaze Spikers
2017	Grand Prix	María José Pérez	OH	Venezuela	F2 Logistics Cargo Movers
2018	Grand Prix	Lindsay Stalzer	OH	United States	Petron Blaze Spikers
2018	Invitational	Ara Galang	OH	Philippines	F2 Logistics Cargo Movers
2018	All-Filipino	Rhea Dimaculangan	S	Philippines	Petron Blaze Spikers
2018	Collegiate Grand Slam	Tots Carlos	OH	Philippines	UP Lady Fighting Maroons
2019	Grand Prix	Stephanie Niemer	OH	United States	Petron Blaze Spikers
2019	All-Filipino	Kalei Mau	OH	United States	F2 Logistics Cargo Movers
2019	Invitational	Majoy Baron	MB	Philippines	F2 Logistics Cargo Movers

=== Men's ===
Season	Conference	Player	Position	Country of birth	Team
2013	Grand Prix	Kheeno Franco	OH	Philippines	PLDT
2014	All-Filipino	Ranran Abdilla	OH	Philippines	PLDT
2014	Grand Prix	Lorenzo Capate	OPP	Philippines	Cignal HD Spikers

== First Best Outside Spiker ==
=== Women's ===
Season	Conference	Player	Country of birth	Team
2013	Invitational	Royse Tubino	Philippines	Cignal HD Spikers
2013	Grand Prix	Li Zhanzhan	China	Cignal HD Spikers
2014	All-Filipino	Stephanie Mercado	Philippines	AirAsia Flying Spikers
2014	Grand Prix	Lindsay Stalzer	United States	Cignal HD Spikers
2015	All-Filipino	Cha Cruz	Philippines	Shopinas.com Lady Clickers
2015	Grand Prix	Ariel Elizabeth Usher	United States	Cignal HD Spikers
2016	Invitational	Sutadta Chuewulim	Thailand	Est Cola
2016	All-Filipino	Ara Galang	Philippines	F2 Logistics Cargo Movers
2016	Grand Prix	Stephanie Niemer	United States	Petron Tri-Activ Spikers
2017	Invitational	Frances Molina	Philippines	Petron Blaze Spikers
2017	All-Filipino	EJ Laure	Philippines	Foton Tornadoes
2017	Grand Prix	Hillary Hurley	United States	Petron Blaze Spikers
2018	Grand Prix	Sara Klisura	Serbia	COCOLIFE Asset Managers
2018	Invitational	Rachel Daquis	Philippines	Cignal HD Spikers
2018	All-Filipino	Rachel Daquis	Philippines	Cignal HD Spikers
2018	Collegiate Grand Slam	Tots Carlos	Philippines	UP Lady Fighting Maroons
2019	Grand Prix	Khat Bell (foreign)	United States	Petron Blaze Spikers
2019	Grand Prix	Ara Galang (local)	Philippines	F2 Logistics Cargo Movers
2019	All-Filipino	Rachel Daquis	Philippines	Cignal HD Spikers
2019	Invitational	Sisi Rondina	Philippines	Petron Blaze Spikers

=== Men's ===
Season	Conference	Player	Country of birth	Team
2013	Grand Prix	Salvador Depante	Philippines	Giligan's Sisig Kings
2014	All-Filipino	Alnakran Abdilla	Philippines	PLDT
2014	Grand Prix	Alnakran Abdilla	Philippines	PLDT

== Second Best Outside Spiker ==
=== Women's ===
Season	Conference	Player	Country of birth	Team
2013	Grand Prix	Wanida Khotrueng	Thailand	Cagayan Valley Lady Rising Suns
2014	All-Filipino	Joy Cases	Philippines	RC Cola Raiders
2014	Grand Prix	Emily Brown	United States	RC Cola Raiders
2015	All Filipino	Patty Jane Orendain	Philippines	Foton Tornadoes
2015	Grand Prix	Bojana Todorovic	United States	Philips Gold Lady Slammers
2016	Invitational	Royse Tubino	Philippines	RC Cola-Army Troopers
2016	All-Filipino	Bernadeth Pons	Philippines	Petron Tri-Activ Spikers
2016	Grand Prix	Ariel Usher	United States	Foton Tornadoes
2017	Invitational	Rachel Daquis	Philippines	Cignal HD Spikers
2017	All-Filipino	Ara Galang	Philippines	F2 Logistics Cargo Movers
2017	Grand Prix	Lindsay Stalzer	United States	Petron Blaze Spikers
2018	Grand Prix	María José Pérez	Venezuela	F2 Logistics Cargo Movers
2018	Invitational	Sisi Rondina	Philippines	Petron Blaze Spikers
2018	All-Filipino	Patty Jane Orendain	Philippines	Generika–Ayala Lifesavers
2018	Collegiate Grand Slam	Mary Anne Mendrez	Philippines	UE Lady Warriors
2019	Grand Prix	-	-	-
2019	All-Filipino	Sisi Rondina	Philippines	Petron Blaze Spikers
2019	Invitational	Shaya Adorador	Philippines	Foton Tornadoes

=== Men's ===
Season	Conference	Player	Country of birth	Team
2013	Grand Prix	Jasper Adorador	Philippines	Maybank Tigers
2014	All-Filipino	Howard Mojica	Philippines	Cignal HD Spikers
2014	Grand Prix	Lorenzo Capate	Philippines	Cignal HD Spikers

== First Middle Blocker ==
=== Women's ===
Season	Conference	Player	Country of birth	Team
2013	Grand Prix	Savannah Noyes	United States	PLDT myDSL Speed Boosters
2014	All-Filipino	Aby Maraño	Philippines	AirAsia Flying Spikers
2014	Grand Prix	Aby Maraño	Philippines	Generika Lifesavers
2015	All Filipino	Dindin Santiago-Manabat	Philippines	Petron Blaze Spikers
2015	Grand Prix	Alexis Olgard	United States	Philips Gold Lady Slammers
2016	Invitational	Aby Maraño	Philippines	F2 Logistics Cargo Movers
2016	All-Filipino	Aby Maraño	Philippines	F2 Logistics Cargo Movers
2016	Grand Prix	Aby Maraño	Philippines	F2 Logistics Cargo Movers
2017	Invitational	Chiriro Fujiwara	Japan	Kobe Shinwa Women's University
2017	All-Filipino	Majoy Baron	Philippines	F2 Logistics Cargo Movers
2017	Grand Prix	Mika Reyes	Philippines	Petron Blaze Spikers
2018	Grand Prix	Aby Maraño	Philippines	F2 Logistics Cargo Movers
2018	Invitational	Mika Reyes	Philippines	Petron Blaze Spikers
2018	All-Filipino	Ria Meneses	Philippines	Generika–Ayala Lifesavers
2018	Collegiate Grand Slam	Aieshalaine Gannaban	Philippines	UP Lady Fighting Maroons
2019	Grand Prix	Grace Lazard (foreign)	United Kingdom	PLDT Home Fibr Power Hitters
2019	Grand Prix	Aby Maraño (local)	Philippines	F2 Logistics Cargo Movers
2019	All-Filipino	Jaja Santiago	Philippines	Foton Tornadoes Blue Energy
2019	Invitational	Majoy Baron	Philippines	F2 Logistics Cargo Movers

=== Men's ===
Season	Conference	Player	Country of birth	Team
2013	Grand Prix	AJ Pareja	Philippines	Systema Active Smashers
2014	All-Filipino	Chris Macasaet	Philippines	Systema Active Smashers
2014	Grand Prix	Antonio Torres	Philippines	Fourbees Cavite Patriots

== Second Middle Blocker ==
=== Women's ===
Season	Conference	Player	Country of birth	Team
2013	Grand Prix	Maureen Penetrante-Ouano	Philippines	Cignal HD Spikers
2014	All-Filipino	Ging Balse	Philippines	Generika Lifesavers
2014	Grand Prix	Dindin Santiago-Manabat	Philippines	Petron Blaze Spikers
2015	All Filipino	Aby Maraño	Philippines	Petron Blaze Spikers
2015	Grand Prix	Jaja Santiago	Philippines	Foton Tornadoes
2016	Invitational	Maica Morada	Philippines	Petron Tri-Activ Spikers
2016	All Filipino	Jaja Santiago	Philippines	Foton Tornadoes
2016	Grand Prix	Maika Angela Ortiz	Philippines	Foton Tornadoes
2017	Invitational	Maica Morada	Philippines	Cignal HD Spikers
2017	All Filipino	Mika Reyes	Philippines	Petron Blaze Spikers
2017	Grand Prix	Majoy Baron	Philippines	F2 Logistics Cargo Movers
2018	Grand Prix	Mika Reyes	Philippines	Petron Blaze Spikers
2018	Invitational	Majoy Baron	Philippines	F2 Logistics Cargo Movers
2018	All-Filipino	Majoy Baron	Philippines	F2 Logistics Cargo Movers
2018	Collegiate Grand Slam	Christine Dianne Francisco	Philippines	UST Golden Tigresses
2019	Grand Prix	-	-	-
2019	All-Filipino	Majoy Baron	Philippines	F2 Logistics Cargo Movers
2019	Invitational	Roselyn Doria	Philippines	Cignal HD Spikers

=== Men's ===
Season	Conference	Player	Country of birth	Team
2013	Grand Prix	Rocky Honrade	Philippines	Systema Active Smashers
2014	All-Filipino	Alex Faytaren	Philippines	IEM Phoenix Volley Masters
2014	Grand Prix	Reyson Fuentes	Philippines	Cignal HD Spikers

== First Best Opposite Spiker ==
=== Women's ===
Season	Conference	Player	Country of birth	Team
2013	Grand Prix	Sue Roces	Philippines	PLDT myDSL Speed Boosters
2014	All Filipino	Sue Roces	Philippines	PLDT Home TVolution Power Attackers
2014	Grand Prix	Natalia Korobkova	Russia	Generika Lifesavers
2015	All Filipino	Michele Gumabao	Philippines	Philips Gold Lady Slammers
2015	Grand Prix	Michele Gumabao	Philippines	Philips Gold Lady Slammers
2016	Invitational	Aiza Maizo-Pontillas	Philippines	Petron Tri-Activ Spikers
2016	All Filipino	Jovelyn Gonzaga	Philippines	RC Cola-Army Troopers
2016	Grand Prix	Jovelyn Gonzaga	Philippines	RC Cola-Army Troopers
2017	Invitational	Mary Grace Berte	Philippines	Foton Tornadoes
2017	All Filipino	Jaja Santiago	Philippines	Foton Tornadoes
2017	Grand Prix	Jaja Santiago	Philippines	Foton Tornadoes
2018	Grand Prix	Elizabeth Ann Wendel	Canada	Foton Tornadoes
2018	Invitational	Aiza Maizo-Pontillas	Philippines	Petron Blaze Spikers
2018	All-Filipino	Aiza Maizo-Pontillas	Philippines	Petron Blaze Spikers
2018	Collegiate Grand Slam	Ejiya Laure	Philippines	UST Golden Tigresses
2019	Grand Prix	Erika Wilson (foreign)	United States	Cignal HD Spikers
2019	Grand Prix	Aiko Urdas (local)	Philippines	PLDT Home Fibr Power Hitters
2019	All-Filipino	Dindin Santiago-Manabat	Philippines	Foton Tornadoes Blue Energy
2019	Invitational	Aiza Maizo-Pontillas	Philippines	Petron Blaze Spikers

=== Men's ===
Season	Conference	Player	Country of birth	Team
2013	Invitational	Henry Pecana	Philippines	PLDT myDSL Speed Boosters
2014	All-Filipino	Gilbert Ablan	Philippines	Cignal HD Spikers
2014	Grand Prix	Gilbert Ablan	Philippines	Cignal HD Spikers

== Second Best Opposite Spiker ==
=== Women's ===
Season	Conference	Player	Country of birth	Team
2015	Grand Prix	Frances Molina	Philippines	Petron Blaze Spikers
2016	Grand Prix	Aiza Maizo-Pontillas	Philippines	Petron Blaze Spikers
2017	Grand Prix	Kim Kianna Dy	Philippines	F2 Logistics Cargo Movers
2018	Grand Prix	Kennedy Lynne Bryan	United States	F2 Logistics Cargo Movers

== First Best Setter ==
=== Women's ===
Season	Conference	Player	Country of birth	Team
2013	Invitational	Arriane Argarin	Philippines	Cignal HD Spikers
2013	Grand Prix	Kaylee Manns	United States	PLDT myDSL Speed Boosters
2014	All Filipino	Rhea Dimaculangan	Philippines	RC Cola Raiders
2014	Grand Prix	Erica Adachi	Brazil	Petron Blaze Spikers
2015	All Filipino	Iris Tolenada	Philippines	Philips Gold Lady Slammers
2015	Grand Prix	Ivy Perez	Philippines	Foton Tornadoes
2016	Invitational	Tichaya Boonlert	Thailand	Est Cola
2016	All Filipino	Kim Fajardo	Philippines	F2 Logistics Cargo Movers
2016	Grand Prix	Kim Fajardo	Philippines	F2 Logistics Cargo Movers
2017	Invitational	Chie Saet	Philippines	Cignal HD Spikers
2017	All Filipino	Rhea Dimaculangan	Philippines	Petron Blaze Spikers
2017	Grand Prix	Kim Fajardo	Philippines	F2 Logistics Cargo Movers
2018	Grand Prix	Kim Fajardo	Philippines	F2 Logistics Cargo Movers
2018	Invitational	Kim Fajardo	Philippines	F2 Logistics Cargo Movers
2018	All-Filipino	Kim Fajardo	Philippines	F2 Logistics Cargo Movers
2018	Collegiate Grand Slam	Laizah Bendong	Philippines	UE Lady Warriors
2019	Grand Prix	Rhea Dimaculangan	Philippines	Petron Blaze Spikers
2019	All-Filipino	Alohi Robins-Hardy	United States	Cignal HD Spikers
2019	Invitational	Angelica Legacion	Philippines	Petron Blaze Spikers

=== Men's ===
Season	Conference	Player	Country of birth	Team
2013	Grand Prix	Rolando Casillan	Philippines	PLDT myDSL Speed Boosters
2014	All-Filipino	Jessie Lopez	Philippines	PLDT Home TVolution Power Attackers
2014	Grand Prix	Allegro Carpio	Philippines	Fourbees Cavite Patriots

== Second Best Setter ==
=== Women's ===
Season	Conference	Player	Country of birth	Team
2015	Grand Prix	Erica Adachi	Brazil	Petron Blaze Spikers

== Best Libero ==
=== Women's ===
==== 1st Best Libero ====
Season	Conference	Player	Country of birth	Team
2013	Grand Prix	Yuki Murakoshi	Japan	TMS-Army Lady Troopers
2014	All Filipino	Lizlee Ann Gata-Pantone	Philippines	PLDT myDSL Speed Boosters
2014	Grand Prix	Jennylyn Reyes	Philippines	Petron Blaze Spikers
2015	All Filipino	Jennylyn Reyes	Philippines	Petron Blaze Spikers
2015	Grand Prix	Jennylyn Reyes	Philippines	Petron Blaze Spikers
2016	Invitational	Anisa Yotpinit	Thailand	Est Cola
2016	All Filipino	Dawn Macandili	Philippines	F2 Logistics Cargo Movers
2016	Grand Prix	Dawn Macandili	Philippines	F2 Logistics Cargo Movers
2017	Invitational	Angelique Dionela	Philippines	Cignal HD Spikers
2017	All Filipino	Angelique Dionela	Philippines	Cignal HD Spikers
2017	Grand Prix	Dawn Macandili	Philippines	F2 Logistics Cargo Movers
2018	Grand Prix	Minami Yoshioka	Japan	F2 Logistics Cargo Movers
2018	Invitational	Dawn Macandili	Philippines	F2 Logistics Cargo Movers
2018	All-Filipino	Kath Arado	Philippines	Generika–Ayala Lifesavers
2018	Collegiate Grand Slam	Kath Arado	Philippines	UE Lady Warriors
2019	Grand Prix	Dawn Macandili	Philippines	F2 Logistics Cargo Movers
2019	All-Filipino	Angelique Dionela	Philippines	Cignal HD Spikers
2019	Invitational	Jennylyn Reyes	Philippines	Foton Tornadoes

==== 2nd Best Libero ====
Season	Conference	Player	Country of birth	Team
2017	Grand Prix	Yuki Fukuda	Japan	Petron Blaze Spikers
2018	Grand Prix	Katarina Vukomanović	Serbia	Foton Tornadoes

=== Men's ===
Season	Conference	Player	Country of birth	Team
2013	Grand Prix	Gilbert Longavela	Philippines	PLDT myDSL Speed Boosters
2014	All-Filipino	Raffy Mosuela	Philippines	PLDT Home TVolution Power Attackers
2014	Grand Prix	Sandy Montero	Philippines	Cignal HD Spikers

== Best Scorer ==
=== Women's ===
Season	Conference	Player	Country of birth	Team
2017	Grand Prix	Sara Klisura (NOTE 1)	Serbia	Foton Tornadoes
2018	Grand Prix	Gyselle de la Caridad Silva (NOTE 2)	Cuba	Smart Prepaid Giga Hitters
2018	Invitational Cup	Patty Jane Orendain	Philippines	Generika–Ayala Lifesavers
2018	All-Filipino	Mylene Paat	Philippines	Cignal HD Spikers
2018	Collegiate Grand Slam	Milena Alessandrini	Italy	UST Golden Tigresses
2019	Grand Prix	Stephanie Niemer	United States	Petron Blaze Spikers
2019	All-Filipino	Kalei Mau	United States	F2 Logistics Cargo Movers
2019	Invitational	Sisi Rondina	Philippines	Petron Blaze Spikers

NOTE 1: Best scorer in a match (41 points)
NOTE 2: Best scorer in a match (56 points)
