= 2013 Philippine Super Liga Grand Prix =

Second conference of the 2013 Philippine Super Liga season

- Duration: November 10 – December 14, 2013
- Teams: Women's: 6 Men's: 4
- TV partner(s): Solar Sports

Women's division
- Champions: TMS–Philippine Army Lady Troopers
- Runners-up: Cignal HD Spikers
- Third place: PLDT myDSL Speed Boosters
- Fourth place: Cagayan Valley Lady Rising Suns
- MVP: Wanitchaya Luangtonglang
- Best OH: Zhanzhan Li; Wanida Kotruang
- Best MB: Savannah Noyes; Maureen Penetrante-Ouano
- Best OPP: Sue Roces
- Best Setter: Kaylee Manns
- Best Libero: Yuki Murakoshi

Men's division
- Champions: PLDT myDSL Speed Boosters
- Runners-up: Systema Active Smashers
- Third place: Maybank Tigers
- Fourth place: Giligan's Sisig Kings
- MVP: Kheeno Franco
- Best OH: Salvador Depante; Jasper Adorador
- Best MB: AJ Pareja; Rocky Honrade
- Best OPP: Henry Pecana
- Best Setter: Rolando Casillan
- Best Libero: Gilbert Longavela

PSL Grand Prix chronology
- 2014 >

PSL conference chronology
- < 2013 Invitational 2014 All-Filipino >

The 2013 Philippine Super Liga Grand Prix was the second conference of the Philippine Super Liga and its inaugural season. The tournament was held from November 10 to December 14, 2013 and saw the introduction of the men's division. The Grand Prix is an import-laden conference. Each team in the women's division is allowed to field two foreign players, known as imports, in their rosters.

Six teams took part in the women's tournament while four competed in the men's tournament. In the women's division, the RC Cola Raiders made their debut while the PCSO Bingo Milyonaryo Puffins departed after just one conference.

The TMS–Philippine Army Lady Troopers clinched back-to-back women's titles, while the PLDT myDSL Speed Boosters won the inaugural men's title.

== Women's division ==
2013 Philippine Super Liga Grand Prix – Women's division
| Abbr. | Team | Affiliation | Head coach | Team captain | Imports |
|---|---|---|---|---|---|
| CAG | Cagayan Valley Lady Rising Suns | Alvaro Antonio | Nestor Pamilar | Angeli Tabaquero | Wanida Kotruang (Thailand); Patcharee Sangmuang (Thailand) |
| CIG | Cignal HD Spikers | Cignal TV, Inc. | Sammy Acaylar | Michelle Datuin | Zhanzhan Li (China); Lei Xie (China) |
| PET | Petron Blaze Spikers | Petron Corporation | Vilet Ponce-De Leon | Karla Bello | Shinako Tanaka (Japan); Misao Tanyama (Japan) |
| PLDT | PLDT myDSL Speed Boosters | Philippine Long Distance Telephone Company | Roger Gorayeb | Lou Ann Latigay | Kaylee Manns (United States); Savannah Noyes (United States) |
| RCC | RC Cola Raiders | Asiawide Refreshments Corporation | Ronald Dulay | Ivy Remulla | Sontaya Keawbundit (Thailand); Minghua Zhang (China) |
| TMS-PA | TMS–Philippine Army Lady Troopers | TMS Ship Agencies, Inc. and Philippine Army | Enrico De Guzman | Tina Salak | Wanitchaya Luangtonglang (Thailand); Yuki Murakoshi (Japan) |

=== Format ===
Classification round

- The classification round was a single round-robin tournament, with each team playing one match against all other teams in their pool for a total of five matches.
- The top two teams earned a bye to the semifinals while the remaining teams started in the quarterfinals.

Quarterfinals

- The quarterfinals featured single-elimination matches.
- The match-ups were as follows:
  - QF1: #3 vs. #6
  - QF2: #4 vs. #5
- The winners advanced to the semifinals while the losers would play in the fifth-place match.

Semifinals

- The semifinals also featured single-elimination matches.
- The match-ups were as follows:
  - SF1: #1 vs. QF2 winner
  - SF2: #2 vs. QF1 winner
- The winners advanced to the championship match while the losers would play in the third-place match.

Finals

- Both the championship, third-place, and fifth-place matches were all single-elimination.
- The match-ups were as follows:
  - Championship match: Semifinal round winners
  - Third-place match: Semifinal round losers
  - Fifth-place match: Quarterfinal round losers

=== Classification round ===
| Pos | Team | Pld | W | L | Pts | SW | SL | SR | SPW | SPL | SPR | Qualification |
|---|---|---|---|---|---|---|---|---|---|---|---|---|
| 1 | PLDT myDSL Speed Boosters | 5 | 5 | 0 | 15 | 15 | 4 | 3.750 | 457 | 371 | 1.232 | Semifinals |
| 2 | TMS–Philippine Army Lady Troopers | 5 | 4 | 1 | 12 | 12 | 5 | 2.400 | 393 | 320 | 1.228 | Semifinals |
| 3 | Cagayan Valley Lady Rising Suns | 5 | 3 | 2 | 9 | 11 | 8 | 1.375 | 420 | 406 | 1.034 | Quarterfinals |
| 4 | Cignal HD Spikers | 5 | 2 | 3 | 6 | 8 | 10 | 0.800 | 376 | 377 | 0.997 | Quarterfinals |
| 5 | Petron Blaze Spikers | 5 | 1 | 4 | 2 | 5 | 14 | 0.357 | 371 | 419 | 0.885 | Quarterfinals |
| 6 | RC Cola Raiders | 5 | 0 | 5 | 1 | 5 | 15 | 0.333 | 346 | 470 | 0.736 | Quarterfinals |

| Date | Time | | Score | | Set 1 | Set 2 | Set 3 | Set 4 | Set 5 | Total | Report |
|---|---|---|---|---|---|---|---|---|---|---|---|
| 10 November | 14:00 | Petron Blaze Spikers | 0–3 | Cagayan Valley Lady Rising Suns | 20–25 | 14–25 | 22–25 | | | 56–75 | |
| 13 November | 14:00 | PLDT myDSL Speed Boosters | 3–1 | Cignal HD Spikers | 25–19 | 21–25 | 25–21 | 25–14 | | 96–79 | |
| 13 November | 16:00 | TMS–Philippine Army Lady Troopers | 3–1 | RC Cola Raiders | 19–25 | 25–15 | 25–21 | 25–16 | | 94–77 | |
| 15 November | 14:00 | Cagayan Valley Lady Rising Suns | 1–3 | TMS–Philippine Army Lady Troopers | 25–19 | 14–25 | 13–25 | 17–25 | | 69–94 | |
| 15 November | 16:00 | Cignal HD Spikers | 3–1 | Petron Blaze Spikers | 17–25 | 25–19 | 15–16 | 25–14 | | 82–74 | |
| 20 November | 14:00 | TMS–Philippine Army Lady Troopers | 0–3 | PLDT myDSL Speed Boosters | 13–25 | 20–25 | 22–25 | | | 55–75 | |
| 20 November | 16:00 | RC Cola Raiders | 1–3 | Cagayan Valley Lady Rising Suns | 25–23 | 16–25 | 18–25 | 12–25 | | 71–98 | |
| 23 November | 14:00 | Cignal HD Spikers | 3–1 | RC Cola Raiders | 25–14 | 25–11 | 25–8 | | | 75–33 | |
| 23 November | 16:00 | Petron Blaze Spikers | 0–3 | TMS–Philippine Army Lady Troopers | 23–25 | 14–25 | 18–25 | | | 55–75 | |
| 27 November | 14:00 | Cagayan Valley Lady Rising Suns | 3–1 | Cignal HD Spikers | 25–14 | 18–25 | 27–25 | 25–23 | | 95–87 | |
| 27 November | 14:00 | PLDT myDSL Speed Boosters | 3–1 | Petron Blaze Spikers | 25–15 | 25–21 | 14–25 | 25–17 | | 89–78 | |
| 29 November | 14:00 | RC Cola Raiders | 1–3 | PLDT myDSL Speed Boosters | 13–25 | 26–24 | 18–25 | 20–25 | | 77–99 | |
| 29 November | 16:00 | Cignal HD Spikers | 0–3 | TMS–Philippine Army Lady Troopers | 5–25 | 18–25 | 20–25 | | | 43–75 | |
| 1 December | 14:00 | PLDT myDSL Speed Boosters | 3–1 | Cagayan Valley Lady Rising Suns | 25–16 | 25–17 | 22–25 | 26–24 | | 98–82 | |
| 1 December | 16:00 | Petron Blaze Spikers | 3–2 | RC Cola Raiders | 20–25 | 19–25 | 25–21 | 25–12 | 15–5 | 104–88 | |

=== Playoffs ===
Quarterfinals
4 | Cignal | 3
5 | Petron | 1
3 | Cagayan Valley | 3
6 | RC Cola | 1

Semifinals
1 | PLDT | 2
4 | Cignal | 3
2 | TMS–Army | 3
3 | Cagayan Valley | 0

Finals
4 | Cignal | 1
2 | TMS–Army | 3

==== Quarterfinals ====
| Date | Time | | Score | | Set 1 | Set 2 | Set 3 | Set 4 | Set 5 | Total | Report |
|---|---|---|---|---|---|---|---|---|---|---|---|
| 4 December | 14:00 | Cagayan Valley Lady Rising Suns | 3–1 | RC Cola Raiders | 25–21 | 25–18 | 15–25 | 25–19 | | 90–83 | |
| 4 December | 16:00 | Cignal HD Spikers | 3–1 | Petron Blaze Spikers | 19–25 | 25–19 | 25–15 | 25–22 | | 94–81 | |

==== Semifinals ====
| Date | Time | | Score | | Set 1 | Set 2 | Set 3 | Set 4 | Set 5 | Total | Report |
|---|---|---|---|---|---|---|---|---|---|---|---|
| 7 December | 14:00 | TMS–Philippine Army Lady Troopers | 3–0 | Cagayan Valley Lady Rising Suns | 25–15 | 25–20 | 25–17 | | | 75–52 | |
| 7 December | 16:00 | PLDT myDSL Speed Boosters | 2–3 | Cignal HD Spikers | 25–17 | 22–25 | 25–21 | 25–27 | 14–16 | 111–106 | |

==== Finals ====
===== Fifth place match =====
| Date | Time | | Score | | Set 1 | Set 2 | Set 3 | Set 4 | Set 5 | Total | Report |
|---|---|---|---|---|---|---|---|---|---|---|---|
| 11 December | 14:00 | RC Cola Raiders | 2–3 | Petron Blaze Spikers | 13–25 | 25–20 | 25–22 | 22–25 | 11–15 | 96–107 | |

===== Third place match =====
| Date | Time | | Score | | Set 1 | Set 2 | Set 3 | Set 4 | Set 5 | Total | Report |
|---|---|---|---|---|---|---|---|---|---|---|---|
| 11 December | 16:00 | Cagayan Valley Lady Rising Suns | 0–3 | PLDT myDSL Speed Boosters | 17–25 | 21–25 | 23–25 | | | 61–75 | |

===== Championship match =====
| Date | Time | | Score | | Set 1 | Set 2 | Set 3 | Set 4 | Set 5 | Total | Report |
|---|---|---|---|---|---|---|---|---|---|---|---|
| 14 December | 16:00 | TMS–Philippine Army Lady Troopers | 3–1 | Cignal HD Spikers | 25–14 | 22–25 | 25–17 | 25–20 | | 97–76 | |

=== Final standing ===
| Rank | Team |
|---|---|
| 1st place, gold medalist(s) | TMS–Philippine Army Lady Troopers |
| 2nd place, silver medalist(s) | Cignal HD Spikers |
| 3rd place, bronze medalist(s) | PLDT myDSL Speed Boosters |
| 4 | Cagayan Valley Lady Rising Suns |
| 5 | Petron Blaze Spikers |
| 6 | RC Cola Raiders |

2013 Philippine Super Liga Grand Prix women's division champions
TMS–Philippine Army Lady Troopers
2nd title

== Men's division ==
2013 Philippine Super Liga Grand Prix – Men's division
| Abbr. | Team | Affiliation | Head coach | Team captain |
|---|---|---|---|---|
| GIL | Giligan's Sisig Kings | Giligan's Restaurant | Franklin Mauricio | Salvador "John" Depante III |
| MAY | Maybank Tigers | Maybank Philippines, Inc. | Ariel Atendido | Michael Maglonzo |
| PLDT | PLDT myDSL Speed Boosters | Philippine Long Distance Telephone Company | Francis Vicente | Richard Gomez |
| SYS | Systema Active Smashers | Peerless Lion Corporation | Sammy Gaddi | Renz B. Ordoñez |

=== Format ===
Classification round

- The classification round was a single round-robin tournament, with each team playing one match against all other teams in their pool for a total of three matches.

Semifinals

- The semifinals featured single-elimination matches.
- The match-ups were as follows:
  - SF1: #1 vs. #4
  - SF2: #2 vs. #3
- The winners advanced to the championship match while the losers would play in the third-place match.

Finals

- Both the championship and third-place matches were single-elimination.
- The match-ups were as follows:
  - Championship match: Semifinal round winners
  - Third-place match: Semifinal round losers

=== Classification round ===
| Pos | Team | Pld | W | L | Pts | SW | SL | SR | SPW | SPL | SPR |
|---|---|---|---|---|---|---|---|---|---|---|---|
| 1 | PLDT myDSL Speed Boosters | 3 | 2 | 1 | 7 | 8 | 3 | 2.667 | 254 | 235 | 1.081 |
| 2 | Systema Active Smashers | 3 | 2 | 1 | 5 | 6 | 5 | 1.200 | 252 | 237 | 1.063 |
| 3 | Giligan's Sisig Kings | 3 | 2 | 1 | 5 | 6 | 5 | 1.200 | 253 | 253 | 1.000 |
| 4 | Maybank Tigers | 3 | 0 | 3 | 1 | 2 | 9 | 0.222 | 226 | 260 | 0.869 |

| Date | Time | | Score | | Set 1 | Set 2 | Set 3 | Set 4 | Set 5 | Total | Report |
|---|---|---|---|---|---|---|---|---|---|---|---|
| 10 November | 16:00 | PLDT myDSL Speed Boosters | 3–0 | Systema Active Smashers | 25–23 | 25–23 | 25–22 | | | 75–68 | |
| 13 November | 18:00 | Maybank Tigers | 0–3 | Giligan's Sisig Kings | 23–25 | 25–27 | 24–26 | | | 72–78 | |
| 15 November | 18:00 | Giligan's Sisig Kings | 3–2 | PLDT myDSL Speed Boosters | 28–26 | 20–25 | 21–25 | 25–19 | 15–8 | 109–103 | |
| 20 November | 18:00 | Systema Active Smashers | 3–2 | Maybank Tigers | 25–21 | 24–26 | 17–25 | 25–17 | 15–7 | 106–96 | |
| 23 November | 18:00 | Systema Active Smashers | 3–0 | Giligan's Sisig Kings | 28–26 | 25–23 | 25–17 | | | 78–66 | |
| 27 November | 18:00 | PLDT myDSL Speed Boosters | 3–0 | Maybank Tigers | 25–21 | 25–13 | 26–24 | | | 76–58 | |

=== Playoffs ===
Semifinals
1 | PLDT | 3
4 | Maybank | 0
2 | Systema | 3
3 | Giligan's | 2

Championship
1 | PLDT | 3
2 | Systema | 2
Third place match
4 | Maybank | 3
3 | Giligan's | 2

==== Semifinals ====
| Date | Time | | Score | | Set 1 | Set 2 | Set 3 | Set 4 | Set 5 | Total | Report |
|---|---|---|---|---|---|---|---|---|---|---|---|
| 1 December | 18:00 | Systema Active Smashers | 3–2 | Giligan's Sisig Kings | 19–25 | 19–25 | 25–22 | 25–23 | 15–11 | 103–106 | |
| 4 December | 18:00 | PLDT myDSL Speed Boosters | 3–0 | Maybank Tigers | 25–17 | 25–15 | 27–25 | | | 77–57 | |

==== Finals ====
===== Third place match =====
| Date | Time | | Score | | Set 1 | Set 2 | Set 3 | Set 4 | Set 5 | Total | Report |
|---|---|---|---|---|---|---|---|---|---|---|---|
| 11 December | 18:00 | Giligan's Sisig Kings | 2–3 | Maybank Tigers | 17–25 | 25–22 | 28–26 | 14–25 | 7–15 | 91–113 | |

===== Championship =====
| Date | Time | | Score | | Set 1 | Set 2 | Set 3 | Set 4 | Set 5 | Total | Report |
|---|---|---|---|---|---|---|---|---|---|---|---|
| 14 December | 14:00 | Systema Active Smashers | 2–3 | PLDT myDSL Speed Boosters | 26–28 | 16–25 | 25–20 | 25–22 | 14–16 | 106–111 | |

=== Final standing ===
| Rank | Team |
|---|---|
| 1st place, gold medalist(s) | PLDT myDSL Speed Boosters |
| 2nd place, silver medalist(s) | Systema Active Smashers |
| 3rd place, bronze medalist(s) | Maybank Tigers |
| 4 | Giligan's Sisig Kings |

Philippine Super Liga Grand Prix men's division champions
PLDT myDSL Speed Boosters
1st title

== Awards ==
| Award | | Men's | Women's |
|---|---|---|---|
| MVP | | (Philippines) Kheeno Franco (PLDT) | (Thailand) Wanitchaya Luangtonglang (TMS-PA) |
| Best Outside Spiker | 1st: 2nd: | (Philippines) Salvador Depante (GIL) (Philippines) Jasper Adorador (MAY) | (China) Zhanzhan Li (CIG) (Thailand) Wanida Kotruang (CAG) |
| Best Middle Blocker | 1st: 2nd: | (Philippines) AJ Pareja (SYS) (Philippines) Rocky Honrade (SYS) | (United States) Savannah Noyes (PLDT) (Philippines) Maureen Penetrante-Ouano (CIG) |
| Best Setter | | (Philippines) Rolando Casillan (PLDT) | (United States) Kaylee Manns (PLDT) |
| Best Opposite | | (Philippines) Henry Pecana (PLDT) | (Philippines) Sue Roces (PLDT) |
| Best Libero | | (Philippines) Gilbert Longavela (PLDT) | (Japan) Yuki Murakoshi (TMS-PA) |

== Venues ==
- Filoil Flying V Arena
- Ynares Sports Arena
