= 2013 Philippine Super Liga season =

- Duration: July 7 – December 14, 2013
- Teams: Women's: 6 Men's: 4
- TV partner: Solar Sports
- Invitational champions: Women's: TMS-Philippine Army Lady Troopers
- Invitational runners-up: Women's: Cignal HD Spikers
- Grand Prix champions: Women's: TMS-Philippine Army Lady Troopers; Men's: PLDT myDSL Speed Boosters
- Grand Prix runners-up: Women's: Cignal HD Spikers; Men's: Systema Active Smashers

Seasons
- 2014 →

The 2013 Philippine Super Liga season was the inaugural season of the Philippine Super Liga (PSL). The first conference of the season was the Invitational Conference, which only featured a women's division. A men's division was added for the succeeding tournament, the Grand Prix.

== Invitational Conference ==
The Invitational Conference was held from July 7 to 28, 2013. It was the maiden tournament of the Philippine Super Liga.

2013 PSL Invitational Conference teams (Women's Division)
Abbr.	Team	Company	Colors	Head coach	Team captain
CAG	Cagayan Valley Lady Rising Suns	Alvaro Antonio		Nestor Pamilar	Wendy Anne Semana (FEU)
CIG	Cignal HD Spikers	Cignal TV, Inc.		Sammy Acaylar	Venus Bernal (UST)
PCSO	PCSO Bingo Milyonaryo Puffins	Philippine Charity Sweepstakes Office		Ronald Dulay	Ivy Remulla (DLSU)
PET	Petron Blaze Spikers	Petron Corporation		Vilet Ponce-De Leon	Roxanne Pimentel-So (UST)
PLDT	PLDT myDSL Speed Boosters	Philippine Long Distance Telephone Company		Francis Vicente	Lou Ann Latigay (SSC-R)
TMS-PA	TMS-Philippine Army Lady Troopers	TMS Ship Agencies, Inc. and Philippine Army		Enrico De Guzman	Joanne Bunag (FEU)

=== Classification round ===
Pos	Team	Pld	W	L	Pts	SW	SL	SR	SPW	SPL	SPR	Qualification
1	TMS–Philippine Army Lady Troopers	5	4	1	12	14	6	2.333	469	373	1.257	Semifinals
2	Cignal HD Spikers	5	3	2	9	11	7	1.571	415	406	1.022	Semifinals
3	Petron Blaze Spikers	5	3	2	9	9	9	1.000	397	407	0.975	Quarterfinals
4	Cagayan Valley Lady Rising Suns	5	3	2	7	10	11	0.909	456	463	0.985	Quarterfinals
5	PLDT myDSL Speed Boosters	5	1	4	4	8	13	0.615	456	483	0.944	Quarterfinals
6	PCSO Bingo Milyonaryo Puffins	5	1	4	4	7	13	0.538	391	452	0.865	Quarterfinals

=== Playoffs ===
Quarterfinals
4	Cagayan Valley	3
5	PLDT	0
3	Petron	3
6	PCSO	2

Semifinals
1	TMS–Army	3
4	Cagayan Valley	2
2	Cignal	3
3	Petron	0

Championship
1	TMS–Army	3
2	Cignal	1

=== Final standings ===
Rank	Team
1st place, gold medalist(s)	TMS-Philippine Army Lady Troopers
2nd place, silver medalist(s)	Cignal HD Spikers
3rd place, bronze medalist(s)	Petron Blaze Spikers
4	Cagayan Valley Lady Rising Suns
5	PLDT myDSL Speed Boosters
6	PCSO Bingo Milyonaryo Puffins

=== Awards ===
Award	Awardee
MVP	Venus Bernal (CIG)
Best Spiker	Honey Royse Tubino (CIG)
Best Blocker	Cristina Salak (TMS-PA)
Best Scorer	Ma. Paulina Soriano (PLDT)
Best Server	Sandra delos Santos (CAG)
Best Setter	Arriane Argarin (CIG)
Best Digger	Angelique Dionela (CAG)
Best Receiver	Jennylyn Reyes (CIG)

== Grand Prix ==
The Grand Prix was held from November 10, 2013 to December 14, 2013. For this conference (women's), each team was allowed to include two import players in the line up. A men's division was also introduced.

=== Women's division ===
Five teams from the Invitational conference continued in the Grand Prix. The PCSO Bingo Milyonaryo Puffins were replaced by the RC Cola Raiders.

2013 PSL Grand Prix teams (Women's Division)
Abbr.	Team	Company	Colors	Head coach	Team captain	Imports
CAG	Cagayan Valley Lady Rising Suns	Alvaro Antonio		Nestor Pamilar	Maria Angeli Tabaquero (UST)	Wanida Khotrueng (Thailand); Patcharee Sangmuang (Thailand)
CIG	Cignal HD Spikers	Cignal TV, Inc.		Sammy Acaylar	Michelle Datuin (DLSU)	Zhanzhan Li (China); Lei Xie (China)
PET	Petron Blaze Spikers	Petron Corporation		Vilet Ponce-De Leon	Karla Bello (ADMU)	Shinako Tanaka (Japan); Misao Tanyama (Japan)
PLDT	PLDT myDSL Speed Boosters	Philippine Long Distance Telephone Company		Roger Gorayeb	Lou Ann Latigay (SSC-R)	Kaylee Manns (United States); Savannah Noyes (United States)
RCC	RC Cola Raiders	Asiawide Refreshments Corporation		Ronald Dulay	Ivy Remulla (DLSU)	Sontaya Keawbundit (Thailand); Minghua Zhang (China)
TMS-PA	TMS-Philippine Army Lady Troopers	TMS Ship Agencies, Inc. and Philippine Army		Enrico De Guzman	Cristina Salak (FEU)	Wanitchaya Luangtonglang (Thailand); Yuki Murakoshi (Japan)

==== Classification round ====
Pos	Team	Pld	W	L	Pts	SW	SL	SR	SPW	SPL	SPR	Qualification
1	PLDT myDSL Speed Boosters	5	5	0	15	15	4	3.750	457	371	1.232	Semifinals
2	TMS–Philippine Army Lady Troopers	5	4	1	12	12	5	2.400	393	320	1.228	Semifinals
3	Cagayan Valley Lady Rising Suns	5	3	2	9	11	8	1.375	420	406	1.034	Quarterfinals
4	Cignal HD Spikers	5	2	3	6	8	10	0.800	376	377	0.997	Quarterfinals
5	Petron Blaze Spikers	5	1	4	2	5	14	0.357	371	419	0.885	Quarterfinals
6	RC Cola Raiders	5	0	5	1	5	15	0.333	346	470	0.736	Quarterfinals

==== Playoffs ====
Quarterfinals
4	Cignal	3
5	Petron	1
3	Cagayan Valley	3
6	RC Cola	1

Semifinals
1	PLDT	2
4	Cignal	3
2	TMS–Army	3
3	Cagayan Valley	0

Finals
4	Cignal	1
2	TMS–Army	3

==== Final standings ====
Rank	Team
1st place, gold medalist(s)	TMS-Philippine Army Lady Troopers
2nd place, silver medalist(s)	Cignal HD Spikers
3rd place, bronze medalist(s)	PLDT myDSL Speed Boosters
4	Cagayan Valley Lady Rising Suns
5	Petron Blaze Spikers
6	RC Cola Raiders

=== Men's division ===
2013 PSL Grand Prix teams (Men's Division)
Abbr.	Team	Company	Colors	Head coach	Team captain
GIL	Giligan's Sisig Kings	Giligan's Restaurant		Franklin Mauricio	Salvador "John" Depante III (UST)
MAY	Maybank Tigers	Maybank Philippines, Inc.		Ariel Atendido	Michael Maglonzo (DLSU)
PLDT	PLDT myDSL Speed Boosters	Philippine Long Distance Telephone Company		Francis Vicente	Richard Gomez (UPOU)
SYS	Systema Active Smashers	Peerless Lion Corporation		Sammy Gaddi	Renz B. Ordoñez (Letran)

==== Classification round ====
Pos	Team	Pld	W	L	Pts	SW	SL	SR	SPW	SPL	SPR
1	PLDT myDSL Speed Boosters	3	2	1	7	8	3	2.667	254	235	1.081
2	Systema Active Smashers	3	2	1	5	6	5	1.200	252	237	1.063
3	Giligan's Sisig Kings	3	2	1	5	6	5	1.200	253	253	1.000
4	Maybank Tigers	3	0	3	1	2	9	0.222	226	260	0.869

==== Playoffs ====
Semifinals
1	PLDT	3
4	Maybank	0
2	Systema	3
3	Giligan's	2

Championship
1	PLDT	3
2	Systema	2
Third place match
4	Maybank	3
3	Giligan's	2

==== Final standings ====
Rank	Team
1st place, gold medalist(s)	PLDT myDSL Speed Boosters
2nd place, silver medalist(s)	Systema Active Smashers
3rd place, bronze medalist(s)	Maybank Tigers
4	Giligan's Sisig Kings

=== Awards ===
Award		Men's	Women's
MVP		(Philippines) Kheeno Franco (PLDT)	(Thailand) Wanitchaya Luangtonglang (TMS-PA)
Best Outside Spiker	1st: 2nd:	(Philippines) Salvador Depante (GIL) (Philippines) Jasper Adorador (MAY)	(China) Zhanzhan Li (CIG) (Thailand) Wanida Khotrueng (CAG)
Best Middle Blocker	1st: 2nd:	(Philippines) AJ Pareja (SYS) (Philippines) Rocky Honrade (SYS)	(United States) Savannah Noyes (PLDT) (Philippines) Maureen Penetrante-Ouano (CIG)
Best Setter		(Philippines) Rolando Casillan (PLDT)	(United States) Kaylee Manns (PLDT)
Best Opposite		(Philippines) Henry Pecana (PLDT)	(Philippines) Suzanne Roces (PLDT)
Best Libero		(Philippines) Gilbert Longavela (PLDT)	(Japan) Yuki Murakoshi (TMS-PA)

== Venues ==
Invitational Conference:

- PhilSports Arena
- Filoil Flying V Arena
- Mall of Asia Arena (semi-finals and finals)

Grand Prix:

- Filoil Flying V Arena
- Ynares Sports Arena

== Brand ambassador ==
- Richard Gomez

== Broadcast partner ==
- Solar Sports
