= 2014 Philippine Super Liga season =

- Duration: May 16 – November 30, 2014
- Teams: Women's: 6 Men's: 4
- TV partner: Solar Sports
- Top draft pick: Dindin Santiago (NU)
- Picked by: Petron Blaze Spikers
- All-Filipino champions: Women's: Generika-Army Lady Troopers; Men's: PLDT Home TVolution–Air Force Power Attackers
- All-Filipino runners-up: Women's: RC Cola–Air Force Raiders; Men's: Cignal HD Spikers
- Grand Prix champions: Women's: Petron Blaze Spikers; Men's:Cignal HD Spikers
- Grand Prix runners-up: Women's: Generika Lifesavers; Men's:PLDT Home Telpad–Air Force Turbo Boosters

Seasons
- ← 2013 2015 →

The 2014 Philippine Super Liga season was the second season of the Philippine Super Liga (PSL). This season featured two conferences, with the first being the new All-Filipino Conference, replacing the Invitational Conference from the previous season, and the Grand Prix.

== Draft (women's division) ==
During the pre-season, the league held its first annual draft for the Women’s Division on April 2, 2014 with Dindin Santiago selected as the first overall pick by the Petron Blaze Spikers.

=== Draft rules ===
Prior to the draft, each of the teams submitted a list of ten protected players as part of their official roster for the 2014 PSL All-Filipino Conference. Players that were not included in the list will be released and placed in the pool of available players – along with the incoming rookies – for the draft. Teams were limited to a maximum of twelve players.

The inaugural draft was held on April 2, 2014 at the NBA Café at SM Aura in Taguig and involved only the Women’s Division.

=== First round ===
Pick	Player	Position	Nationality	Team	College
1	Dindin Santiago	Middle Hitter	Philippines	Petron Blaze Spikers	NU
2	Aby Maraño	Middle Hitter	Philippines	AirAsia Flying Spikers	DLSU
3	Iari Yongco	Utility Hitter	Philippines	RC Cola Air Force Raiders	DLSU-D
4	Janine Marciano	Open Hitter	Philippines	Cagayan Valley Lady Rising Suns	SBC
5	Jamenea Ferrer	Setter	Philippines	PLDT Home TVolution Power Attackers	ADMU
6	Norie Jane Diaz	Middle Hitter	Philippines	Cignal HD Spikers	UPHSD
7	Christine Agno	Libero	Philippines	Generika-Army Lady Troopers	FEU

=== Second round ===
Pick	Player	Position	Nationality	Team	College
1	Carmina Aganon	Open Hitter	Philippines	Petron Blaze Spikers	NU
2	Wensh Tiu	Open Hitter	Philippines	AirAsia Flying Spikers	DLSU
3	Jill Gustilo	Libero	Philippines	RC Cola Air Force Raiders	AdU
4	Charlene Gillego	Libero	Philippines	Cagayan Valley Lady Rising Suns	FEU
5	Sasa Devanadera	Middle Hitter	Philippines	PLDT Home TVolution Power Attackers	SSC-R
6	Michiko Castaneda	Middle Hitter	Philippines	Cignal HD Spikers	UP
7	Joyce Palad	Middle Hitter	Philippines	Generika-Army Lady Troopers	UP

=== Third round ===
Pick	Player	Position	Nationality	Team	College
1	Mayette Zapanta	Opposite Hitter	Philippines	Petron Blaze Spikers	AdU
2	May Macatuno	Setter	Philippines	AirAsia Flying Spikers	AdU
3	Toni Faye Tan		Philippines	RC Cola Air Force Raiders	UP

=== Fourth round ===
Pick	Player	Position	Nationality	Team	College
1	Ariana Angustia	Middle Hitter	Philippines	AirAsia Flying Spikers	EAC
2	Southlyn Ramos	Middle Hitter	Philippines	RC Cola Air Force Raiders	UP

== All-Filipino Conference ==
The All-Filipino Conference was held between May 16, 2014 to July 26, 2014 with the Generika-Army Lady Troopers and the PLDT Home TVolution-Air Force Power Attackers emerging as champions for the Women’s and Men’s divisions, respectively.

=== Women's division ===
2014 PSL All-Filipino Conference teams (Women's Division)
Abbr.	Team	Company	Colors	Head coach	Team captain
AIR	AirAsia Flying Spikers	AirAsia Philippines		Ramil de Jesus	Charleen Abigail Cruz (DLSU)
CAG	Cagayan Valley Lady Rising Suns	Alvaro Antonio		Nestor Pamilar	Maria Angeli Tabaquero (UST)
CIG	Cignal HD Spikers	Cignal TV, Inc.		Sammy Acaylar	Michelle Datuin (DLSU)
GEN-PA	Generika-Army Lady Troopers	Erikagen, Inc. and Philippine Army		Enrico De Guzman	Ma. Theresa Iratay (FEU)
PET	Petron Blaze Spikers	Petron Corporation		George Pascua	Gretchen Ho (ADMU)
PLDT	PLDT Home TVolution Power Attackers	Philippine Long Distance Telephone Company		Roger Gorayeb	Suzanne Roces (UE)
RCC	RC Cola–Air Force Raiders	ARC Refreshments Corporation		Clarence Esteban	Wendy Anne Semana (FEU)

==== Classification round ====
Pos	Team	Pld	W	L	Pts	SW	SL	SR	SPW	SPL	SPR	Qualification
1	Generika–Army Lady Troopers	6	4	2	13	15	8	1.875	546	492	1.110	Semifinals
2	RC Cola–Air Force Raiders	6	4	2	11	13	8	1.625	480	442	1.086	Semifinals
3	Petron Blaze Spikers	6	4	2	11	13	10	1.300	439	404	1.087	Quarterfinals
4	AirAsia Flying Spikers	6	4	2	11	13	10	1.300	415	427	0.972	Quarterfinals
5	Cagayan Valley Lady Rising Suns	6	2	4	7	10	13	0.769	512	514	0.996	Quarterfinals
6	PLDT Home TVolution Power Attackers	6	2	4	6	9	12	0.750	532	584	0.911	Quarterfinals
7	Cignal HD Spikers	5	1	4	4	5	13	0.385	453	521	0.869	

==== Playoffs ====
Quarterfinals
4	AirAsia	3
5	Cagayan Valley	2
3	Petron	1
6	PLDT	3

Semifinals
1	Generika–Army	3
4	AirAsia	0
2	RC Cola–Air Force	3
6	PLDT	2

Championship
1	Generika–Army	3
2	RC Cola–Air Force	0

==== Final standings ====
Rank	Team
1st place, gold medalist(s)	Generika-Army Lady Troopers
2nd place, silver medalist(s)	RC Cola–Air Force Raiders
3rd place, bronze medalist(s)	PLDT Home TVolution Power Attackers
4	AirAsia Flying Spikers
5	Petron Blaze Spikers
6	Cagayan Valley Lady Rising Suns
7	Cignal HD Spikers

=== Men’s division ===
2014 PSL All-Filipino Conference teams (Men's Division)
Abbr.	Team	Company	Colors	Head coach	Team captain
CIG	Cignal HD Spikers	Cignal TV, Inc.		Michael Cariño	Dexter Clamor (UPHSD)
IEM	Instituto Estetico Manila Phoenix Volley Masters	Instituto Estetico Manila		Ernesto Balubar	John Angelo Macalma (PMMA)
PLDT	PLDT Home TVolution–Air Force Power Attackers	Philippine Long Distance Telephone Company		Jasper Jimenez	Dante Alinsunurin (AdU)
SYS	Systema Active Smashers	Peerless Lion Corporation		Oliver Almadro	André Joseph Pareja (ADMU)
VIA	Via Mare Voyagers	Via Mare Corporation		Sergio “Vip” Isada	Jerrico Hubalde (UP)

==== Classification round ====
Pos	Team	Pld	W	L	Pts	SW	SL	SR	SPW	SPL	SPR	Qualification
1	PLDT Home TVolution-Air Force Power Attackers	8	8	0	23	24	5	4.800	703	556	1.264	Finals
2	Cignal HD Spikers	8	6	2	16	16	12	1.333	700	690	1.014	Finals
3	Systema Active Smashers	8	3	5	10	15	18	0.833	620	617	1.005	
4	Instituto Estetico Manila Phoenix Volley Masters	8	3	5	10	12	15	0.800	590	607	0.972	
5	Via Mare Voyagers	8	0	8	1	5	24	0.208	683	826	0.827	

==== Finals ====
Finals
1	PLDT	3
2	Cignal	0

==== Final standings ====
Rank	Team
1st place, gold medalist(s)	PLDT Home TVolution–Air Force Power Attackers
2nd place, silver medalist(s)	Cignal HD Spikers
3rd place, bronze medalist(s)	Systema Active Smashers
4	Instituto Estetico Manila Phoenix Volley Masters
5	Via Mare Voyagers

=== Awards ===
Award		Men's	Women's
MVP		Alnakran Abdilla (PLDT)	Tina Salak (GEN-PA)
Best Outside Spiker	1st: 2nd:	Alnakran Abdilla (PLDT); Howard Mojica (CIG)	Stephanie Mercado (AIR); Joy Cases (RCC)
Best Middle Blocker	1st: 2nd:	Chris Macasaet (SYS); Alexis Faytaren (IEM)	Abigail Maraño (AIR); Mary Jean Balse (GEN-PA)
Best Setter		Jessie Lopez (PLDT)	Rhea Dimaculangan (RCC)
Best Opposite Spiker		Gilbert Ablan (CIG)	Suzanne Roces (PLDT)
Best Libero		Raffy Mosuela (PLDT)	Lizlee Ann Pantone (PLDT)

== Grand Prix ==
The champions of the Grand Prix - the Petron Blaze Spikers (women's) and the Cignal HD Spikers (men's) - will represent the Philippines in the 2015 Asian Women's Club Volleyball Championship and Asian Men's Club Volleyball Championship, respectively.

=== Women's division ===
2014 PSL Grand Prix teams (Women's Division)
Abbr.	Team	Company	Colors	Head coach	Team captain	Imports
CIG	Cignal HD Spikers	Cignal TV, Inc.		Sammy Acaylar	Honey Royse Tubino (UPHSD)	Sarah Ammerman (United States); Lindsay Stalzer (United States)
FOT	Foton Tornadoes	United Asia Automotive Group, Inc.		Ma. Vilet Ponce de Leon	Jill Gustilo (AdU)	Elena Tarasova (Russia); Irina Tarasova (Russia)
GEN	Generika Lifesavers	Erikagen, Inc.		Ramil de Jesus	Charleen Abigail Cruz (DLSU)	Natalia Korobkova (Russia); Miyu Shinohara (Japan)
MNT	Mane 'n Tail Lady Stallions	Federated Distributors, Inc.		Francis Vicente	Kaylee Manns (United States) (Iowa State)	Kristy Jaeckel (United States); Kaylee Manns (United States)
PET	Petron Blaze Spikers	Petron Corporation		George Pascua	Gretchen Ho (ADMU)	Erica Adachi (Brazil); Alaina Bergsma (United States)
RCC	RC Cola–Air Force Raiders	ARC Refreshments Corporation		Rhovyl Verayo	Wendy Anne Semana (FEU)	Emily Brown (United States); Bonita Wise (United States)

==== Classification round ====
Pos	Team	Pld	W	L	Pts	SW	SL	SR	SPW	SPL	SPR	Qualification
1	Petron Blaze Spikers	10	8	2	24	27	14	1.929	950	861	1.103	Semifinals
2	Generika Lifesavers	10	7	3	21	23	17	1.353	893	846	1.056	Semifinals
3	RC Cola–Air Force Raiders	10	5	5	15	21	19	1.105	890	882	1.009	Semifinals
4	Cignal HD Spikers	10	4	6	12	18	21	0.857	844	856	0.986	Semifinals
5	Mane 'n Tail Lady Stallions	10	3	7	9	16	24	0.667	867	916	0.947	Fifth place match
6	Foton Tornadoes	10	3	7	9	14	24	0.583	779	862	0.904	Fifth place match

==== Playoffs ====
Semifinals
1	Petron	3
4	Cignal	0
2	Generika	3
3	RC Cola–Air Force	0

Championship
1	Petron	3
2	Generika	1
Third place match
4	Cignal	1
3	RC Cola–Air Force	3

==== Final standings ====
Rank	Team
1st place, gold medalist(s)	Petron Blaze Spikers
2nd place, silver medalist(s)	Generika Lifesavers
3rd place, bronze medalist(s)	RC Cola–Air Force Raiders
4	Cignal HD Spikers
5	Foton Tornadoes
6	Mane 'n Tail Lady Stallions

Qualified for the 2015 Asian Club Volleyball Championship

=== Men’s division ===
2014 PSL Grand Prix teams (Men's Division)
Abbr.	Team	Company	Colors	Head coach	Team captain
BEN-SYS	Bench–Systema Active Smashers	Suyen Corporation and Peerless Lion Corporation		Arnold Laniog	Chris Macasaet (DLSU)
CAV	Fourbees Cavite Patriots Total Attackers	(Fourbees)		Jason Sapin	Edgardo Rusit (Las Piñas College)
CIG	Cignal HD Spikers	Cignal TV, Inc.		Michael Carino	Jay dela Cruz (UPHSD)
MAY	Maybank Tigers	Maybank Philippines, Inc.		Janley Patrona	Alejandro Mallari (DLSU)
PLDT	PLDT Home Telpad–Air Force Turbo Boosters	Philippine Long Distance Telephone Company		Jasper Jimenez	Dante Alinsunurin (AdU)

==== Classification round ====
Pos	Team	Pld	W	L	Pts	SW	SL	SR	SPW	SPL	SPR	Qualification
1	PLDT Home Telpad–Air Force Turbo Boosters	4	4	0	12	12	2	6.000	363	286	1.269	Semifinals
2	Cignal HD Spikers	4	3	1	9	10	4	2.500	333	275	1.211	Semifinals
3	Fourbees Cavite Patriots Total Attackers	4	2	2	6	7	8	0.875	326	358	0.911	Semifinals
4	Maybank Tigers	4	1	3	3	4	9	0.444	258	244	1.057	Semifinals
5	Bench–Systema Active Smashers	4	0	4	0	2	12	0.167	241	358	0.673	

==== Playoffs ====
Semifinals
1	PLDT–Air Force	3
4	Maybank	0
2	Cignal	3
3	Fourbees Cavite	2

Championship
1	PLDT–Air Force	0
2	Cignal	3
Third place match
4	Maybank	0
3	Fourbees Cavite	3

==== Final standings ====
Rank	Team
1st place, gold medalist(s)	Cignal HD Spikers
2nd place, silver medalist(s)	PLDT Home Telpad–Air Force Turbo Boosters
3rd place, bronze medalist(s)	Fourbees Cavite Patriots Total Attackers
4	Maybank Tigers
5	Bench–Systema Active Smashers

Qualified for the 2015 Asian Club Volleyball Championship

=== Awards ===
Award		Men's	Women's
MVP		Lorenzo Capate Jr. (CIG)	Alaina Bergsma (PET)
Best Outside Spiker	1st: 2nd:	Alnakran Abdilla (PLDT); Lorenzo Capate Jr. (CIG)	Lindsay Stalzer (CIG); Emily Brown (RCC)
Best Middle Blocker	1st: 2nd:	Antonio Torres (CAV); Reyson Fuentes (CIG)	Abigail Maraño (GEN); Dindin Santiago (PET)
Best Opposite Spiker		Gilbert Ablan (CIG)	Natalia Korobkova (GEN)
Best Setter		Alegro Carpio (CAV)	Erica Adachi (PET)
Best Libero		Sandy Monterro (CIG)	Jennylyn Reyes (PET)

== Venues ==
All-Filipino Conference:

- Cuneta Astrodome
- University of San Carlos gymnasium

Grand Prix:

- Smart Araneta Coliseum – opening day
- Cuneta Astrodome
- Santo Domingo Coliseum
- Muntinlupa Sports Complex
- Alonte Sports Arena

== Brand ambassador ==
- Gretchen Ho

== Broadcast partner ==
- Solar Sports
