= 2014 Philippine Super Liga Grand Prix =

Second conference of the 2014 Philippine Super Liga season

- Duration: October 18 – November 30, 2014
- Teams: Women's: 6 Men's: 5
- TV partner(s): Solar Sports

Women's division
- Champions: Petron Blaze Spikers
- Runners-up: Generika Lifesavers
- Third place: RC Cola–Air Force Raiders
- Fourth place: Cignal HD Spikers
- MVP: Alaina Bergsma
- Best OH: Lindsay Stalzer; Emily Brown
- Best MB: Aby Maraño; Dindin Santiago
- Best OPP: Natalia Korobkova
- Best Setter: Erica Adachi
- Best Libero: Jennylyn Reyes

Men's division
- Champions: Cignal HD Spikers
- Runners-up: PLDT Home Telpad–Air Force Turbo Boosters
- Third place: Fourbees Cavite Patriots Total Attackers
- Fourth place: Maybank Tigers
- MVP: Lorenzo Capate Jr.
- Best OH: Alnakran Abdilla; Lorenzo Capate Jr.
- Best MB: Antonio Torres; Reyson Fuentes
- Best OPP: Gilbert Ablan
- Best Setter: Alegro Carpio
- Best Libero: Sandy Montero

PSL Grand Prix chronology
- < 2013 2015 >

PSL conference chronology
- < 2014 All-Filipino 2015 All-Filipino >

The 2014 Philippine Super Liga Grand Prix was the second conference of the 2014 season of the Philippine Super Liga (PSL) and the second running of the Grand Prix. The tournament ran from October 18 to November 30, 2014. The tournament's major sponsor was Asics. FIVB Referees Commission director Mohammed Hassan was the guest of honor of the opening ceremony held in Smart Araneta Coliseum.

Six teams took part in the women's division, the first time it has contracted. The AirAsia Flying Spikers, Cagayan Valley Lady Rising Suns, PLDT Home TVolution Power Attackers, and the three-time defending champion Philippine Army Lady Troopers all left. All teams except AirAsia had been taking part in the Shakey's V-League at the same time. Three teams made their debut in the Foton Tornadoes, Generika Lifesavers, and the original incarnation of the Mane 'n Tail Lady Stallions. Generika, which became independent in this conference, acquired the franchise previously held by AirAsia.

Five teams took part in the men's division, which saw the debut of the Fourbees Cavite Patriots Total Attackers and the returning Maybank Tigers. The Via Mare Voyagers left after just one conference while Instituto Estetico Manila Phoenix Volley Masters moved to the SVL's new men's division.

The Petron Blaze Spikers became just the second team to win a PSL women's title while the Cignal HD Spikers men's team won the men's division title. Both teams would represent the Philippines at the 2015 Asian Women's Club Volleyball Championship and 2015 Asian Men's Club Volleyball Championship, respectively.

This would also be the last conference where the PSL hosted a men's division, which was dissolved for indoor conferences following the establishment of Spikers' Turf.

== Women's division ==
2014 Philippine Super Liga Grand Prix – Women's division
Abbr.	Team	Affiliation	Head coach	Team captain	Imports
CIG	Cignal HD Spikers	Cignal TV, Inc.	Sammy Acaylar	Honey Royse Tubino	Sarah Ammerman (United States); Lindsay Stalzer (United States)
FOT	Foton Tornadoes	United Asia Automotive Group, Inc.	Ma. Vilet Ponce de Leon	Jill Gustilo	Elena Tarasova (Russia); Irina Tarasova (Russia)
GEN	Generika Lifesavers	Erikagen, Inc.	Ramil de Jesus	Charleen Abigail Cruz	Natalia Korobkova (Russia); Miyu Shinohara (Japan)
MNT	Mane 'n Tail Lady Stallions	Federated Distributors, Inc.	Francis Vicente	Kaylee Manns (United States)	Kristy Jaeckel (United States); Kaylee Manns (United States)
PET	Petron Blaze Spikers	Petron Corporation	George Pascua	Gretchen Ho	Erica Adachi (Brazil); Alaina Bergsma (United States)
RCC	RC Cola-Air Force Raiders	ARC Refreshments Corporation	Rhovyl Verayo	Wendy Anne Semana	Emily Brown (United States); Bonita Wise (United States)

=== Uniforms ===
For the women's division, the color combination of each team's uniforms deviated from its respective brand colors.

Team	Brand colors		Dark	Alternate	Light
Cignal HD		Jersey			
Cignal HD		Shorts			
Foton		Jersey			
Foton		Shorts			
Generika		Jersey			
Generika		Shorts			
Mane 'n Tail		Jersey			
Mane 'n Tail		Shorts			
Petron Blaze		Jersey			
Petron Blaze		Shorts			
RC Cola-Air Force		Jersey			
RC Cola-Air Force		Shorts			

=== Format ===
Classification round

- The classification round was a double round-robin tournament, with each team playing two matches against all other teams in their pool for a total of ten matches.
- The top four teams advanced to the semifinals while teamks ranked fifth and sixth would place in the fifth-place match.

Semifinals

- The semifinals also single-elimination matches.
- The match-ups were as follows:
  - SF1: #1 vs. #4
  - SF2: #2 vs. #3
- The winners advanced to the championship match while the losers would play in the third-place match.

Finals

- The championship, third-place, and fifth-place matches were all single-elimination.
- The match-ups were as follows:
  - Championship match: Semifinal round winners
  - Third-place match: Semifinal round losers
  - Fifth-place match: #5 vs. #6

=== Classification round ===
Pos	Team	Pld	W	L	Pts	SW	SL	SR	SPW	SPL	SPR	Qualification
1	Petron Blaze Spikers	10	8	2	24	27	14	1.929	950	861	1.103	Semifinals
2	Generika Lifesavers	10	7	3	21	23	17	1.353	893	846	1.056	Semifinals
3	RC Cola–Air Force Raiders	10	5	5	15	21	19	1.105	890	882	1.009	Semifinals
4	Cignal HD Spikers	10	4	6	12	18	21	0.857	844	856	0.986	Semifinals
5	Mane 'n Tail Lady Stallions	10	3	7	9	16	24	0.667	867	916	0.947	Fifth place match
6	Foton Tornadoes	10	3	7	9	14	24	0.583	779	862	0.904	Fifth place match

Date	Time		Score		Set 1	Set 2	Set 3	Set 4	Set 5	Total	Report
18 October	14:00	Cignal HD Spikers	3–0	RC Cola–Air Force Raiders	25–17	25–23	25–23			75–63	P2
18 October	16:00	Generika Lifesavers	1–3	Petron Blaze Spikers	24–26	18–25	25–23	23–25		90–99	P2
22 October	14:00	Cignal HD Spikers	3–1	Mane 'n Tail Lady Stallions	25–15	22–25	25–19	26–24		98–83	P2
22 October	16:00	RC Cola–Air Force Raiders	3–0	Foton Tornadoes	25–13	25–20	25–14			75–47	P2
25 October	14:00	Mane 'n Tail Lady Stallions	1–3	Petron Blaze Spikers	25–21	16–25	21–25	27–29		89–100	P2
25 October	16:00	Generika Lifesavers	1–3	RC Cola–Air Force Raiders	20–25	23–25	25–18	25–27		93–95	P2
29 October	14:00	Mane 'n Tail Lady Stallions	3–2	Foton Tornadoes	25–22	17–25	22–25	25–18	15–6	104–96	P2
29 October	16:00	Cignal HD Spikers	0–3	Petron Blaze Spikers	17–25	20–25	23–25			60–75	P2
05 November	14:00	Generika Lifesavers	3–1	Foton Tornadoes	15–25	25–22	25–20	25–15		90–82	
05 November	16:00	RC Cola–Air Force Raiders	1–3	Petron Blaze Spikers	30–28	23–25	16–25	19–25		88–103	
07 November	14:00	Mane 'n Tail Lady Stallions	1–3	RC Cola–Air Force Raiders	22–25	24–26	25–22	22–25		93–98	
07 November	16:00	Cignal HD Spikers	3–0	Foton Tornadoes	27–25	25–14	25–21			77–60	
09 November	14:00	Generika Lifesavers	0–3	Mane 'n Tail Lady Stallions	22–25	15–25	21–25			58–75	
09 November	16:00	Foton Tornadoes	1–3	Petron Blaze Spikers	21–25	21–25	25–23	19–25		86–98	
12 November	14:00	Cignal HD Spikers	0–3	Generika Lifesavers	23–25	18–25	20–25			61–75	
12 November	16:00	Mane 'n Tail Lady Stallions	0–3	Foton Tornadoes	23–25	22–25	13–25			58–75	
14 November	14:00	Cignal HD Spikers	2–3	Petron Blaze Spikers	18–25	12–25	25–18	25–16	14–16	94–100	
14 November	16:00	Generika Lifesavers	3–0	Foton Tornadoes	25–22	25–15	25–18			75–55	
15 November	14:00	Cignal HD Spikers	1–3	Mane 'n Tail Lady Stallions	14–25	25–17	26–28	21–25		86–95	
15 November	16:00	Foton Tornadoes	3–2	RC Cola–Air Force Raiders	22–25	15–25	25–20	25–22	15–12	102–104	
16 November	14:00	RC Cola–Air Force Raiders	3–1	Petron Blaze Spikers	25–20	25–20	16–25	25–22		91–87	
16 November	16:00	Generika Lifesavers	3–2	Mane 'n Tail Lady Stallions	25–22	27–29	25–18	22–25	15–12	114–106	
19 November	14:00	Cignal HD Spikers	2–3	Generika Lifesavers	19–25	20–25	25–20	25–22	9–15	98–107	
19 November	16:00	Mane 'n Tail Lady Stallions	1–3	RC Cola–Air Force Raiders	25–19	15–25	22–25	19–25		81–94	
20 November	14:00	Foton Tornadoes	1–3	Petron Blaze Spikers	21–25	18–25	25–23	15–25		79–98	
20 November	16:00	Cignal HD Spikers	3–2	RC Cola–Air Force Raiders	23–25	22–25	25–21	25–16	16–14	111–101	
22 November	14:00	Mane 'n Tail Lady Stallions	1–3	Petron Blaze Spikers	16–25	25–22	19–25	23–25		83–97	
22 November	16:00	Generika Lifesavers	3–1	RC Cola–Air Force Raiders	25–15	25–21	15–25	25–21		90–82	
26 November	14:00	Cignal HD Spikers	1–3	Foton Tornadoes	19–25	17–25	25–22	23–25		84–97	
26 November	16:00	Generika Lifesavers	3–2	Petron Blaze Spikers	18–25	25–12	25–20	18–25	15–11	101–93	

=== Final round ===
Semifinals
1	Petron	3
4	Cignal	0
2	Generika	3
3	RC Cola–Air Force	0

Championship
1	Petron	3
2	Generika	1
Third place match
4	Cignal	1
3	RC Cola–Air Force	3

==== Semifinals ====
Date	Time		Score		Set 1	Set 2	Set 3	Set 4	Set 5	Total	Report
28 November	14:00	Petron Blaze Spikers	3–0	Cignal HD Spikers	25–23	25–16	25–21			75–60	
28 November	16:00	Generika Lifesavers	3–0	RC Cola–Air Force Raiders	25–23	25–16	25–23			75–62	

==== Finals ====
===== Fifth place match =====
Date	Time		Score		Set 1	Set 2	Set 3	Set 4	Set 5	Total	Report
30 November	14:00	Mane 'n Tail Lady Stallions	2–3	Foton Tornadoes	23–25	25–18	25–17	12–25	12–15	97–100	

===== Third place match =====
Date	Time		Score		Set 1	Set 2	Set 3	Set 4	Set 5	Total	Report
30 November	16:00	Cignal HD Spikers	1–3	RC Cola–Air Force Raiders	24–26	25–23	20–25	24–26		93–100	

===== Championship match =====
Date	Time		Score		Set 1	Set 2	Set 3	Set 4	Set 5	Total	Report
30 November	18:00	Petron Blaze Spikers	3–1	Generika Lifesavers	25–21	21–25	25–15	25–9		96–70	

=== Final standing ===
Rank	Team
1st place, gold medalist(s)	Petron Blaze Spikers
2nd place, silver medalist(s)	Generika Lifesavers
3rd place, bronze medalist(s)	RC Cola-Air Force Raiders
4	Cignal HD Spikers
5	Foton Tornadoes
6	Mane 'n Tail Lady Stallions

Qualified for the 2015 Asian Club Volleyball Championship

2014 Philippine Super Liga Grand Prix
Women's Division Champions

1st title

Team roster
1 Mary Grace Masangkay
2 Alaina Bergsma (United States)
3 Gretchen Ho (c)
4 Carmina Aganon
5 Luisa Mae Zapanta
7 Frances Xinia Molina
8 Jozza Cabalsa
9 Erica Adachi (Brazil)
10 Sandra Delos Santos
11 Ana Ma. Del Mundo
12 Jennylyn Reyes
13 Mecaila Irish May Morada
15 Fille Saint Merced Cayetano
16 Dindin Santiago

Head coach
George Pascua

== Men's division ==
2014 Philippine Super Liga Grand Prix – Men's division
Abbr.	Team	Affiliation	Head coach	Team captain
BEN-SYS	Bench–Systema Active Smashers	Suyen Corporation and Peerless Lion Corporation	Arnold Laniog	Chris Macasaet
CAV	Fourbees Cavite Patriots Total Attackers	Fourbees	Jason Sapin	Edgardo Rusit
CIG	Cignal HD Spikers	Cignal TV, Inc.	Michael Cariño	Jay dela Cruz
MAY	Maybank Tigers	Maybank Philippines, Inc.	Janley Patrona	Alejandro Mallari
PLDT	PLDT Home Telpad–Air Force Turbo Boosters	Philippine Long Distance Telephone Company	Jasper Jimenez	Dante Alinsunurin

=== Format ===
Classification round

- The classification round was a single round-robin tournament, with each team playing one match against all other teams in their pool for a total of four matches.
- The top four teams advanced to the semifinals while the fifth-place team was eliminated.

Semifinals

- The semifinals featured single-elimination matches.
- The match-ups were as follows:
  - SF1: #1 vs. #4
  - SF2: #2 vs. #3
- The winners advanced to the championship match while the losers would play in the third-place match.

Finals

- Both the championship and third-place matches were all single-elimination.
- The match-ups were as follows:
  - Championship match: Semifinal round winners
  - Third-place match: Semifinal round losers

=== Classification round ===
Pos	Team	Pld	W	L	Pts	SW	SL	SR	SPW	SPL	SPR	Qualification
1	PLDT Home Telpad–Air Force Turbo Boosters	4	4	0	12	12	2	6.000	363	286	1.269	Semifinals
2	Cignal HD Spikers	4	3	1	9	10	4	2.500	333	275	1.211	Semifinals
3	Fourbees Cavite Patriots Total Attackers	4	2	2	6	7	8	0.875	326	358	0.911	Semifinals
4	Maybank Tigers	4	1	3	3	4	9	0.444	258	244	1.057	Semifinals
5	Bench–Systema Active Smashers	4	0	4	0	2	12	0.167	241	358	0.673	

Date	Time		Score		Set 1	Set 2	Set 3	Set 4	Set 5	Total	Report
22 October	18:00	Cignal HD Spikers	3–0	Bench–Systema Active Smashers	25–23	25–16	25–13			75–52	P2
29 October	18:00	PLDT Home Telpad–Air Force Turbo Boosters	3–0	Fourbees Cavite Patriots Total Attackers	30–28	25–12	25–17			80–57	P2
05 November	18:00	Cignal HD Spikers	3–0	Maybank Tigers	25–15	25–21	25–12			75–48	
07 November	18:00	Fourbees Cavite Patriots Total Attackers	3–1	Maybank Tigers	25–22	25–16	19–25	25–23		94–86	
09 November	18:00	Cignal HD Spikers	3–1	Fourbees Cavite Patriots Total Attackers	25–18	25–16	24–26	25–16		99–76	
12 November	18:00	Fourbees Cavite Patriots Total Attackers	3–1	Bench–Systema Active Smashers	23–25	25–22	25–22	26–24		99–93	
14 November	18:00	Cignal HD Spikers	1–3	PLDT Home Telpad–Air Force Turbo Boosters	24–26	25–23	14–25	21–25		84–99	
14 November	18:00	PLDT Home Telpad–Air Force Turbo Boosters	3–0	Maybank Tigers	25–14	25–20	25–15			75–49	
16 November	18:00	Maybank Tigers	3–0	Bench–Systema Active Smashers*	25–0	25–0	25–0			75–0	
19 November	18:00	PLDT Home Telpad–Air Force Turbo Boosters	3–1	Bench–Systema Active Smashers	25–19	26–28	33–31	25–18		109–96	

* forfeit

=== Playoffs ===
Semifinals
1	PLDT–Air Force	3
4	Maybank	0
2	Cignal	3
3	Fourbees Cavite	2

Championship
1	PLDT–Air Force	0
2	Cignal	3
Third place match
4	Maybank	0
3	Fourbees Cavite	3

==== Semifinals ====
Date	Time		Score		Set 1	Set 2	Set 3	Set 4	Set 5	Total	Report
20 November	18:00	PLDT Home Telpad–Air Force Turbo Boosters	3–0	Maybank Tigers	25–19	25–21	25–21			75–61	
22 November	18:00	Cignal HD Spikers	3–2	Fourbees Cavite Patriots Total Attackers	23–25	25–18	31–33	25–16	15–6	119–98	

==== Finals ====
===== Third place match =====
Date	Time		Score		Set 1	Set 2	Set 3	Set 4	Set 5	Total	Report
26 November	18:00	Maybank Tigers	0–3	Fourbees Cavite Patriots Total Attackers	14–25	24–26	22–25			60–76	

===== Championship match =====
Date	Time		Score		Set 1	Set 2	Set 3	Set 4	Set 5	Total	Report
28 November	16:00	PLDT Home Telpad–Air Force Turbo Boosters	0–3	Cignal HD Spikers	23–25	24–26	19–25			66–76	

=== Final standing ===
Rank	Team
1st place, gold medalist(s)	Cignal HD Spikers
2nd place, silver medalist(s)	PLDT Home Telpad–Air Force Turbo Boosters
3rd place, bronze medalist(s)	Fourbees Cavite Patriots Total Attackers
4	Maybank Tigers
5	Bench–Systema Active Smashers

Qualified for the 2015 Asian Club Volleyball Championship

2014 Philippine Super Liga Grand Prix
Men's Division Champions

1st title

Team roster
1 Adam Daquer
2 Jay Dela Cruz (c)
3 Glacy Ralph Diezmo
4 Edmar Sanchez
5 Dexter Clamor
6 Sandy Domenick Montero
7 Gilbert Ablan
9 Ralph Joren Savellano
11 Jeffrey Lansangan
12 Alexis Faytaren
14 Herschel Ramos
15 Emmanuel Luces
16 Rayson Fuentes

Head coach
Michael Cariño

== Awards ==
Award		Men's	Women's
MVP		Lorenzo Capate Jr. (CIG)	Alaina Bergsma (United States) (PET)
Best Outside Spiker	1st:	Alnakran Abdilla (PLDT)	Lindsay Stalzer (United States) (CIG)
Best Outside Spiker	2nd:	Lorenzo Capate Jr. (CIG)	Emily Brown (United States) (RCC)
Best Middle Blocker	1st:	Antonio Torres (CAV)	Abigail Maraño (GEN)
Best Middle Blocker	2nd:	Reyson Fuentes (CIG)	Dindin Santiago (PET)
Best Opposite Spiker		Gilbert Ablan (CIG)	Natalia Korobkova (Russia) (GEN)
Best Setter		Alegro Carpio (CAV)	Erica Adachi (Brazil) (PET)
Best Libero		Sandy Montero (CIG)	Jennylyn Reyes (PET)

== Venues ==
- Smart Araneta Coliseum – opening day
- Cuneta Astrodome
- Santo Domingo Coliseum
- Muntinlupa Sports Complex
- Alonte Sports Arena

== Broadcast partner ==
- Solar Sports
