= Wings (Indonesian company) =

Indonesian consumer goods company

Coordinates: 7.2603°S 112.7361°E

PT Wings Surya
- Trade name: Wings Group
- Formerly: Fa Wings (1948–1981); Solar Wings (1991–2004)
- Company type: Private
- Industry: Consumer goods
- Founded: 21 September 1948; 77 years ago
- Founder: Johannes Ferdinand Katuari; Harjo Sutanto
- Headquarters: Surabaya, East Java, Indonesia
- Area served: Worldwide
- Key people: Eddy William Katuari (Chairman); Harjo Sutanto (CEO)
- Products: Toothpastes; Beverages; Soaps; Shampoos; Shower gels; Cosmetics; Lotions; Deodorants; Chocolates; Energy drinks; Cleaning agents; Air fresheners; Fragrances; Instant noodles; Ice cream; Instant coffee; Chips; Condiments; Pharmaceuticals and consumer healthcares
- Revenue: ▲ Rp 35.1 billion (2023)
- Owner: Katuari family; Sutanto family
- Number of employees: 3,000 (2023)
- Subsidiaries: Wings Care; Wings Food; Calbee Wings; Glico Wings; Lion Wings
- Website: www.wingscorp.com

PT Wings Surya, also known as the Wings Group or simply Wings, is an Indonesian multinational consumer goods company headquartered in Surabaya. It was founded on 21 September 1948 as Fa Wings, by Johannes Ferdinand Katuari and Harjo Sutanto.

== History ==
In 1948, Johannes Ferdinand Katuari (Oen Jong Khing) and Harjo Sutanto (Tan Siek Miauw), the co-founders of Wings, began producing a simple laundry soap in their backyard, using limited resources. Katuari and Sutanto operated out of a small workshop in their home in Surabaya, East Java, peddling their goods door to door, at market stalls, and travelling from village to village. They gradually expanded their business, developing more effective detergent formulations, later including cream detergent, which is much cheaper than powder detergent due to low energy cost and low investment cost of machinery. This product thus became successful as a practical and economical way of doing laundry, spreading throughout Java and subsequently the whole of Indonesia.

In 1981, Wings expanded their business by building a third factory in Jakarta together with Lion Corporation Japan. In 1991 the company was renamed Solar Wings, and in 2004 was renamed again as Wings Surya.

== Products ==
Its products include shampoo, shower gel, skin care products, pharmaceutical and healthcare, toothpaste, dishwasher liquid, toilet soap, floorcleaners, fabric softeners, sanitary napkins, and bottled water.
