= Alaina Bergsma =

American volleyball player (born 1990)

Personal information
- Full name: Alaina Lynn Bergsma
- Nationality: American
- Born: March 30, 1990 (age 36)
- Home town: Chandler, Arizona, U.S.
- Education: University of Oregon
- Height: 6 ft 3 in (1.90 m)
- Weight: 172 lb (78 kg)
- Spike: 119 in (301 cm)
- Block: 110 in (290 cm)

Volleyball information
- Position: Opposite Spiker

Career
- Years: Team
- 2013: Mets de Guaynabo
- 2013–2014: Minas Tênis Clube
- 2014–2015: Petron Blaze Spikers
- 2015: Gigantes de Carolina
- 2015: Supreme Chonburi
- 2016–2019: Daejeon KGC

National team
- Years: Team
- 2013–2014: United States

Alaina Bergsma (born March 30, 1990) is an American former volleyball player. She is 6 feet 3 inches (1.90 m) tall and played the position of hitter. She was on the United States women's national volleyball team.

== College ==
During her college career at the University of Oregon, Bergsma won the 2009 All-West Coast Conference Team and was Freshman of the Year. In 2010, she was an All-Pac-10 Honorable Mention. In 2011, she was selected as an AVCA Third-Team All-American and to the All-Pac-12/Region First Team.

During the 2012 season, she was the AVCA National Player of the Year, Pac-12 Player of the Year, AVCA First-Team All-American, All-Pac-12/Region First Team and the Capital One Third-Team Academic All-American.

Bergsma won the Honda Sports Award as the nation's best collegiate female volleyball player in 2013.

== Club volleyball ==
Bergsma won the 2014 Philippine Superliga Grand Prix Finals Most Valuable Player award and the Superliga crown.

She joined the Korean V-League club Daejeon KGC for the 2016/17 season. and helped Daejeon to the silver medal in the Korean Cup. She scored 55 points in the Korean League second semifinal match against IBK Altos, scoring 50 points in attack and five blocks, tying as the third major total points ever recorded. Her team lost the semifinal 2-3 to IBK and settled with the bronze medal. In May 2017 she renewed her contract with Daejeon.

== Personal life ==
Bergsma studied sports business in college. In 2012, she won the Miss Oregon USA pageant and represented Oregon in Miss USA 2012, where she did not place but was awarded "Miss Photogenic".

== Clubs ==
- (Puerto Rico) Mets de Guaynabo (2013)
- (Brazil) Minas Tênis Clube (2013–2014)
- (Philippines) Petron Blaze Spikers (2014–2015)
- (Puerto Rico) Gigantes de Carolina (2015)
- (Thailand) Supreme Chonburi (2015)
- (China) Yunnan Volleyball (2015-2016)
- (Indonesia) Gresik Petrokimia (2016)
- (South Korea) Daejeon KGC (2016–2019)

== Awards ==
=== College ===
- 2009 All-West Coast Conference Team
- 2009 WCC Freshman of the Year
- 2010 All-Pac-10 Honorable Mention
- 2011 AVCA Third-Team All-American
- 2012 AVCA National Player of the Year
- 2012 Pac-12 Player of the Year
- 2012 AVCA First-Team All-American
- 2012 Capital One Third-Team Academic All-American
- 2013 Honda Sports Award for volleyball

=== Individuals ===
- 2014 Philippine Superliga Grand Prix "Finals Most Valuable Player"
- 2016/17 Korean V-League "Best Opposite"
- 2016/17 Korean V-League "All-Star Game Most Valuable Player"

=== Clubs ===
- 2014 Philippine Superliga Grand Prix – Champion, with Petron Blaze Spikers
- 2016 Korean Cup – Runner-Up, with Daejeon KGC
- 2016/17 Korean V-League – Bronze medal, with Daejeon KGC
