= Philippine Super Liga =

Professional volleyball league in the Philippines

- PSL logo from 2017
- Sport: Volleyball
- Founded: 2013
- First season: 2013
- Folded: 2021
- Motto: Iba ang laro dito (lit. 'The game is different here')
- Country: Philippines
- Continent: AVC (Asia)
- Last champions: W: F2 Logistics Cargo Movers; M: Cignal HD Spikers
- Most titles: W: Petron Blaze Spikers (9 titles)
- Website: philippinesuperliga.com [inactive]

The Philippine Super Liga (PSL; alternatively spelled as Philippine Superliga) was a non-professional corporate club women's volleyball league in the Philippines. It was first organized by SportsCore Event Management and Consultancy, Inc. and later owned by Athletic Events & Sports Management Group (ACES), Inc. The league was envisioned to provide former collegiate players a league with which they can continue with their volleyball career.

The PSL also had a men's division from 2013 to 2014, although its beach volleyball tournament both have a women's and men's division since its inception.

In 2021, the PSL was left without any active team after all teams either filed a leave of absence due to the COVID-19 pandemic or moved to the newly professionalized Premier Volleyball League, the PSL's rival league.

== History ==
PSL logo for its first season (2013)

=== 2013–2016: Early years ===
The Philippine Super Liga was established in 2013 with Philip Ella Juico as cahirman and Tats Suzara as president. The league is recognized by the Larong Volleyball sa Pilipinas (LVPI), the International Volleyball Federation (FIVB) and the Asian Volleyball Confederation (AVC). The league maintains strong ties with the international governing bodies, adhering by the rules and regulations set by the FIVB and AVC. The PSL became a FIVB-accredited club league and its teams and players also became registered with the FIVB.

To begin, the PSL had six member teams, two of which (Cignal HD Spikers and Petron Blaze Spikers) would stick around throughout the entire lifetime of the league. Its inaugural conference, the 2013 Invitational Conference, ran throughout the month of July. During the league's early conferences, the Philippine Army Troopers were dominant, winning the first three conferences. For the second conference of 2013, the Grand Prix, the league established the country's first men's club volleyball tournament, which included four teams.

After the 2014 Philippine Super Liga All-Filipino Conference, the Army departed the PSL after their primary sponsor decided to form a team of their own, leaving the championship open. For the next six conferences through 2016, four teams won the title, with two each going to the Petron Blaze Spikers and the Foton Tornadoes (the franchise later known as the Chery Tiggo Crossovers). The Army also returned for the 2016 season, winning the 2016 Invitational Cup while the F2 Logistics Cargo Movers won their first in the 2016 All-Filipino Conference.

Meanwhile, the league in 2015 also held the first edition of the Beach Volleyball Challenge Cup. However the men's division tournaments ended in 2015 following the establishment of Spikers' Turf, organized by Sports Vision of the rival Shakey's V-League.

=== 2017–2020: Later years ===
The league's later years were known for the rivalry between F2 Logistics and Petron. The last eight championships were won by either team, seven of which were contested by both. In 2018, the league underwent major organizational changes after both Suzara and financer Don Caringal resigned due to alleged unauthorized misuse of the league's funds. In July, the league a theft complaint against the two key officials with the National Bureau of Investigation.

At the same time, the PSL also had to compete with the Premier Volleyball League, an evolution of the Shakey's V-League. In 2020, due to the COVID-19 pandemic in the Philippines, both leagues suspended play. During the pandemic, the PVL made the transition to a professional league while the PSL decided to remain a non-professional league. Laurel feared that going professional meant that teams won't be able to field players from the collegiate level, stressing that a move to professional status can only be done through a merger between the two leagues.

=== The end of the Super Liga ===
By the time the PSL resumed play with the 2021 Beach Volleyball Challenge Cup, the league only had three active member teams: Chery Tiggo, F2 Logistics, and the Sta. Lucia Lady Realtors. The Petro Gazz Angels had planned to move from the PVL to PSL, but it fell through. After the tournament, all three of them had transferred to the PVL, leaving the PSL with zero active member teams.

After the mass exodus of teams, the PSL would refocus on “sports development”. In 2022, the organization behind the league would partner with Shakey's Pizza to form the collegiate and high school league, the Shakey's Super League.

== Media coverage ==
Solar Sports was the league's official broadcaster for its first two seasons in 2014 and 2015. while TV5 was the official broadcaster from the 2015 to 2020 season.

In February 2021, the league terminated its broadcast deal with TV5 following the transfer of the Cignal HD Spikers to rival league, the Premier Volleyball League (PVL), and Cignal TV's acquisition of a three-year deal for the broadcasting rights of the PVL. The league was in negotiations with GMA Network as its new broadcast partner when the three remaining active member teams transferred to rival PVL in March 2021.

== Teams ==
Teams in the Philippine Super Liga are mostly commercial-based, with companies serving as the owners of the team. The table below does not include guest teams, collegiate teams, or Beach Volleyball Challenge Cup teams.

=== Women's division ===
Philippine Super Liga member teams
Team	Affiliation	Founded	First PSL conference	Last PSL conference
AirAsia Flying Spikers	AirAsia Philippines	2014	2014 All-Filipino	
Cagayan Valley Lady Rising Suns	Antonio family	2012	2013 Invitational	2014 All-Filipino
Cignal HD Spikers	Cignal TV, Inc.	2013	2013 Invitational	2020 Grand Prix
Cocolife Asset Managers	Cocolife	2017	2017 Invitational	2019 Grand Prix
F2 Logistics Cargo Movers	F2 Logistics Philippines, Inc.	2013	2013 Invitational	2020 Grand Prix
Foton Tornadoes / Chery Tiggo Crossovers	Mileage Asia Corporation	2016	2014 Grand Prix	2020 Grand Prix
Generika–Ayala Lifesavers	Actimed, Inc. / Ayala Corporation	2014	2014 Grand Prix	2020 Grand Prix
Mane 'n Tail Lady Stallions	Federated Distributors, Inc.	2015	2015 All-Filipino	
Marinerang Pilipina Lady Skippers	Marinerang Pilipina Group	2019	2019 All-Filipino	2020 Grand Prix
Meralco Power Spikers	Meralco	2013	2015 All-Filipino	
New San Jose Builders Victorias	New San Jose Builders, Inc.	2016	2016 Invitational	
PCSO Bingo Milyonaryo Puffins	Philippine Charity Sweepstakes Office	2013	2013 Invitational	
Petron Blaze Spikers	Petron Corporation	2013	2013 Invitational	2020 Grand Prix
Philippine Army Lady Troopers	Philippine Army	2011	2013 Invitational	2018 Invitational
Philips Gold Lady Slammers	Federated Distributors, Inc.	2014	2014 Grand Prix	2015 Grand Prix
PLDT Home Fibr Hitters	PLDT Inc.	2018	2018 Grand Prix	2020 Grand Prix
PLDT Home Ultera Ultra Fast Hitters	PLDT Inc.	2013	2013 Invitational	2014 All-Filipino
RC Cola Raiders	ARC Refreshments Corporation	2013	2013 Invitational	2015 Grand Prix
Shopinas.com Lady Clickers	Air21 Global, Inc.	2015	2015 All-Filipino	
Sta. Lucia Lady Realtors	Sta. Lucia Land, Inc.	2017	2017 Invitational	2020 Grand Prix
Standard Insurance–Navy Corvettes	Standard Insurance Company, Inc. / Philippine Navy	2016	2016 All-Filipino	

==== Timeline ====
Below is a timeline of teams that have competed throughout the history of the league. The table does not include teams for the league's men's division. For historical purposes, the Foton Tornadoes and Chery Tiggo Crossovers are considered the same team.

=== Men's division ===
Philippine Super Liga men's division member teams
Team	Affiliation	Founded	First PSL conference	Last PSL conference
Cignal HD Spikers	Cignal TV, Inc.	2014	2014 All-Filipino	2014 Grand Prix
Fourbees Cavite Patriots Total Attackers	Fourbees	2014	2014 Grand Prix	
Giligan's Sisig Kings	Giligan's Restaurant	2013	2013 Grand Prix	
Instituto Estetico Manila Phoenix Volley Masters	Instituto Estetico Manila	2011	2014 All-Filipino	
Maybank Tigers	Maybank Philippines, Inc.	2011	2014 All-Filipino	
PLDT Home Telpad Turbo Boosters	PLDT Inc.	2013	2013 Grand Prix	2014 Grand Prix
Systema Active Smashers	Peerless Lion Corporation	2013	2013 Grand Prix	2014 Grand Prix
Via Mare Voyagers	Via Mare Corporation	2014	2014 All-Filipino	

== Results summary ==
=== Women's division ===
==== All-Filipino Conference ====
Season	Champions	Runners-up	Third place	Details
2014	Philippine Army Lady Troopers	RC Cola–Air Force Raiders	PLDT Home TVolution Power Attackers	2014 All-Filipino
2015	Petron Blaze Spikers	Shopinas.com Lady Clickers	Philips Gold Lady Slammers	2015 All-Filipino
2016	F2 Logistics Cargo Movers	Foton Tornadoes	Philippine Army Lady Troopers	2016 All-Filipino
2017	Petron Blaze Spikers	F2 Logistics Cargo Movers	Cignal HD Spikers	2017 All-Filipino
2018	Petron Blaze Spikers	F2 Logistics Cargo Movers	Generika–Ayala Lifesavers	2018 All-Filipino
2019	F2 Logistics Cargo Movers	Cignal HD Spikers	Petron Blaze Spikers	2019 All-Filipino

==== Grand Prix ====
Season	Champions	Runners-up	Third place	Details
2013	Philippine Army Lady Troopers	Cignal HD Spikers	PLDT myDSL Speed Boosters	2013 Grand Prix
2014	Petron Blaze Spikers	Generika Lifesavers	RC Cola–Air Force Raiders	2014 Grand Prix
2015	Foton Tornadoes	Petron Blaze Spikers	Philips Gold Lady Slammers	2015 Grand Prix
2016	Foton Tornadoes	Petron Blaze Spikers	F2 Logistics Cargo Movers	2016 Grand Prix
2017	F2 Logistics Cargo Movers	Petron Blaze Spikers	Foton Tornadoes	2017 Grand Prix
2018	Petron Blaze Spikers	F2 Logistics Cargo Movers	Foton Tornadoes	2018 Grand Prix
2019	Petron Blaze Spikers	F2 Logistics Cargo Movers	PLDT Home Fibr Power Hitters	2019 Grand Prix
2020	Conference cancelled			2020 Grand Prix

==== Invitational ====
Season	Champions	Runners-up	Third place	Details
2013	Philippine Army Lady Troopers	Cignal HD Spikers	Petron Blaze Spikers	2013 Invitational
2016	Philippine Army Lady Troopers Est Cola (co-champion)	—N/a	Petron Tri-Activ Spikers	2016 Invitational
2017	Kobe Shinwa Women's University Cignal HD Spikers (co-champion)	—N/a	Petron Blaze Spikers	2017 Invitational
2018	F2 Logistics Cargo Movers	Petron Blaze Spikers	Cignal HD Spikers	2018 Invitational
2019	F2 Logistics Cargo Movers	Petron Blaze Spikers	Cignal HD Spikers	2019 Invitational

==== Collegiate Grand Slam ====
Season	Champions	Runners-up	Third place	Details
2018	UP Lady Maroons	UST Golden Tigresses	UE Lady Warriors	2018 Collegiate

=== Men's division ===
==== All-Filipino Conference ====
Season	Champions	Runners-up	Third place	Details
2014	PLDT Home TVolution–Air Force Power Attackers	Cignal HD Spikers	Systema Active Smashers	2014 All-Filipino

==== Grand Prix ====
Season	Champions	Runners-up	Third place	Details
2013	PLDT myDSL Speed Boosters	Systema Active Smashers	Maybank Tigers	2013 Grand Prix
2014	Cignal HD Spikers	PLDT Home Telpad–Air Force Turbo Boosters	Fourbees Cavite Patriots Total Attackers	2014 Grand Prix

=== Beach Volleyball Challenge Cup ===
Season	Women's division			Men's division		
Season	Champions	Runners-up	Third place	Champions	Runners-up	Third place
2015	Giligan's Sisig Queens	Foton Tornadoes	Cignal HD Spikers (Team B)	SM By The Bay (Team A)	Champion Infinity Active Smashers (Team B)	Cignal HD Spikers (Team A)
2016	Philippine Army Lady Troopers (Team A)	Foton Toplanders	FEU Tamaraws	Philippine Navy Fighting Stingrays	Team Volleyball Manila	FEU Tamaraws (Team A)
2017	Petron Sprint 4T	Generika–Ayala Lifesavers (Team A)	Petron XCS	Generika–Ayala Lifesavers	Cignal HD Spikers	SM By The Bay
2018	Petron XCS	Sta. Lucia Lady Realtors (Team A)	Generika–Ayala Lifesavers (Team A)	Foton Tornadoes	Sands SM By The Bay	Smart Prepaid Giga Hitters
2019	Petron XCS	Sta. Lucia–Santorini	Sta. Lucia–Woodside	Cignal HD Spikers	Foton Tornadoes	Philippine Army Troopers
2021	Abanse Negrense (Team A)	Sta. Lucia Lady Realtors (Team A)	Abanse Negrense (Team B)	No tournament		

== Brand ambassadors ==
- Richard Gomez (2013)
- Gretchen Ho (2014)
- Charleen Abigail Cruz (2015)
- Mika Reyes (2016)
- Aby Maraño (2017)
- Rachel Daquis (2018)
- Majoy Baron (2020)

== See also ==
- Premier Volleyball League
- Shakey's Super League
- Spikers' Turf
