= Mane 'n Tail Lady Stallions =

The Mane 'n Tail Lady Stallions may refer to one of two teams:

- Mane 'n Tail Lady Stallions (2014), most recently played as the Pocari Sweat Lady Warriors
- Mane 'n Tail Lady Stallions (2015)
