= 2013 Philippine Super Liga Invitational Conference =

Inaugural conference of the Philippine Super Liga

- Duration: July 7–28, 2013
- Teams: 6
- TV partner(s): Solar Sports

Results
- Champions: TMS–Philippine Army Lady Troopers
- Runners-up: Cignal HD Spikers
- Third place: Petron Blaze Spikers
- Fourth place: Cagayan Valley Lady Rising Suns

Awards
- MVP: Venus Bernal

PSL Invitational Conference chronology
- 2016 >

PSL conference chronology
- 2013 Grand Prix >

The 2013 Philippine Super Liga Invitational Conference was the first conference of the Philippine Super Liga and its inaugural season. The tournament ran from July 7 to 28, 2013.

Six teams made up the inaugural tournament, concluding with the TMS–Philippine Army Lady Troopers becoming the first PSL champions after defeating the Cignal HD Spikers in the final.

== Participating teams ==
2013 Philippine Super Liga Invitational Conference
Abbr.	Team	Affiliation	Head coach	Team captain
CAG	Cagayan Valley Lady Rising Suns	Alvaro Antonio	Nestor Pamilar	Wendy Semana
CIG	Cignal HD Spikers	Cignal TV, Inc.	Sammy Acaylar	Venus Bernal
PCSO	PCSO Bingo Milyonaryo Puffins	Philippine Charity Sweepstakes Office	Ronald Dulay	Ivy Remulla
PET	Petron Blaze Spikers	Petron Corporation	Ma. Vilet Ponce de Leon	Roxanne Pimentel-So
PLDT	PLDT myDSL Speed Boosters	Philippine Long Distance Telephone Company	Francis Vicente	Lou Ann Latigay
TMS-PA	TMS–Philippine Army Lady Troopers	Philippine Army / TMS Ship Agencies, Inc.	Enrico de Guzman	Joanne Bunag

== Format ==
Classification round

- The classification round was a single round-robin tournament, with each team playing one match against all other teams in their pool for a total of five matches.
- The top two teams earned a bye to the semifinals while the remaining teams started in the quarterfinals.

Quarterfinals

- The quarterfinals featured single-elimination matches.
- The match-ups were as follows:
  - QF1: #3 vs. #6
  - QF2: #4 vs. #5
- The winners advanced to the semifinals while the losers would play in the fifth-place match.

Semifinals

- The semifinals also featured single-elimination matches.
- The match-ups were as follows:
  - SF1: #1 vs. QF2 winner
  - SF2: #2 vs. QF1 winner
- The winners advanced to the championship match while the losers would play in the third-place match.

Classification matches

- The fifth place match was a single-elimination match between the quarterfinal round winners.
- The third place match was also a single-elimination match between the semifinal round winners.

Finals

- The finals was a single-elimination match between the semifinal round winners.

== Classification round ==
Pos	Team	Pld	W	L	Pts	SW	SL	SR	SPW	SPL	SPR	Qualification
1	TMS–Philippine Army Lady Troopers	5	4	1	12	14	6	2.333	469	373	1.257	Semifinals
2	Cignal HD Spikers	5	3	2	9	11	7	1.571	415	406	1.022	Semifinals
3	Petron Blaze Spikers	5	3	2	9	9	9	1.000	397	407	0.975	Quarterfinals
4	Cagayan Valley Lady Rising Suns	5	3	2	7	10	11	0.909	456	463	0.985	Quarterfinals
5	PLDT myDSL Speed Boosters	5	1	4	4	8	13	0.615	456	483	0.944	Quarterfinals
6	PCSO Bingo Milyonaryo Puffins	5	1	4	4	7	13	0.538	391	452	0.865	Quarterfinals

Date	Time		Score		Set 1	Set 2	Set 3	Set 4	Set 5	Total	Report
7 July	14:00	Petron Blaze Spikers	0–3	Cignal HD Spikers	22–25	17–25	23–25			62–75	
7 July	15:30	PLDT myDSL Speed Boosters	3–1	PCSO Bingo Milyonaryo Puffins	22–25	25–18	25–22	25–20		97–85	
7 July	17:00	TMS–Philippine Army Lady Troopers	2–3	Cagayan Valley Lady Rising Suns	23–25	27–25	24–26	25–14	12–15	111–105	
10 July	14:00	Cignal HD Spikers	1–3	TMS–Philippine Army Lady Troopers	22–25	15–25	27–25	18–25		82–100	
10 July	16:00	PCSO Bingo Milyonaryo Puffins	2–3	Cagayan Valley Lady Rising Suns	25–16	18–25	25–20	15–25	13–15	96–101	
10 July	18:00	PLDT myDSL Speed Boosters	1–3	Petron Blaze Spikers	22–25	18–25	25–17	20–25		85–92	
12 July	14:00	PLDT myDSL Speed Boosters	1–3	Cagayan Valley Lady Rising Suns	16–25	17–25	28–26	23–25		84–101	
12 July	16:00	Petron Blaze Spikers	0–3	TMS–Philippine Army Lady Troopers	19–25	15–25	19–25			53–75	
12 July	18:00	PCSO Bingo Milyonaryo Puffins	3–1	Cignal HD Spikers	16–25	25–23	25–17	25–21		91–86	
14 July	14:00	Petron Blaze Spikers	3–1	PCSO Bingo Milyonaryo Puffins	18–25	25–21	25–22	25–16		93–84	
14 July	16:00	Cagayan Valley Lady Rising Suns	0–3	Cignal HD Spikers	18–25	21–25	22–25			61–75	
14 July	18:00	PLDT myDSL Speed Boosters	2–3	TMS–Philippine Army Lady Troopers	14–25	26–24	23–25	19–25	15–10	97–109	
17 July	14:00	Cignal HD Spikers	3–1	PLDT myDSL Speed Boosters	21–25	25–21	26–24	25–22		97–92	
17 July	16:00	TMS–Philippine Army Lady Troopers	3–0	PCSO Bingo Milyonaryo Puffins	25–19	25–15	25–11			75–45	
17 July	18:00	Cagayan Valley Lady Rising Suns	1–3	Petron Blaze Spikers	21–25	23–25	25–22	19–25		88–97	

== Playoffs ==
=== Bracket ===
Quarterfinals
4	Cagayan Valley	3
5	PLDT	0
3	Petron	3
6	PCSO	2

Semifinals
1	TMS–Army	3
4	Cagayan Valley	2
2	Cignal	3
3	Petron	0

Championship
1	TMS–Army	3
2	Cignal	1

=== Quarterfinals ===
Date	Time		Score		Set 1	Set 2	Set 3	Set 4	Set 5	Total	Report
21 July	14:00	Petron Blaze Spikers	3–2	PCSO Bingo Milyonaryo Puffins	27–29	25–13	22–25	25-22	15-12	114–67	
21 July	16:00	Cagayan Valley Lady Rising Suns	3–0	PLDT myDSL Speed Boosters	27–25	25–20	25–15			77–60	

=== Semifinals ===
Date	Time		Score		Set 1	Set 2	Set 3	Set 4	Set 5	Total	Report
26 July	17:00	TMS–Philippine Army Lady Troopers	3–2	Cagayan Valley Lady Rising Suns	25–22	25–22	25–27	10–25	15–13	100–109	
26 July	19:00	Cignal HD Spikers	3–0	Petron Blaze Spikers	25–20	25–20	25–23			75–63	

=== Fifth place match ===
Date	Time		Score		Set 1	Set 2	Set 3	Set 4	Set 5	Total	Report
28 July	14:00	PLDT myDSL Speed Boosters	3–2	PCSO Bingo Milyonaryo Puffins	25–18	26–24	21–25	21–25	20–18	113–110	

=== Third place match ===
Date	Time		Score		Set 1	Set 2	Set 3	Set 4	Set 5	Total	Report
28 July	16:00	Petron Blaze Spikers	3–1	Cagayan Valley Lady Rising Suns	25–18	22–25	26–24	25–16		98–83	

=== Finals ===
Date	Time		Score		Set 1	Set 2	Set 3	Set 4	Set 5	Total	Report
28 July	18:00	TMS–Philippine Army Lady Troopers	3–1	Cignal HD Spikers	25–15	25–18	14–25	25–16		89–74	

== Final standing ==
Rank	Team
1st place, gold medalist(s)	TMS–Philippine Army Lady Troopers
2nd place, silver medalist(s)	Cignal HD Spikers
3rd place, bronze medalist(s)	Petron Blaze Spikers
4	Cagayan Valley Lady Rising Suns
5	PLDT myDSL Speed Boosters
6	PCSO Bingo Milyonaryo Puffins

2013 Philippine Super Liga Invitational Conference champions
TMS–Philippine Army Lady Troopers
1st title

== Awards ==
Award	Recipient	Team
Most Valuable Player	Venus Bernal	Cignal
Best Spiker	Royse Tubino	Cignal
Best Blocker	Tina Salak	TMS-Philippine Army
Best Scorer	Pau Soriano	PLDT
Best Server	Sandra delos Santos	Cagayan Valley
Best Setter	Arriane Argarin	Cignal
Best Digger	Angelique Dionela	Cagayan Valley
Best Receiver	Jennylyn Reyes	Cignal

== Venues ==
- PhilSports Arena
- Filoil Flying V Arena
- Mall of Asia Arena (semi-finals and finals)
