= Giligan's volleyball teams =

Giligan's
- Short name: Gilgan's
- Nickname: Sisig Kings, Sisig Queens
- Founded: 2013
- Dissolved: 2015
- Manager: Frank Mauricio
- Captain: Salvador "John" Depante III (UST)
- League: Philippine Super Liga
- 2013 Grand Prix: 4th place

Uniforms
Home	Away

Giligan's Restaurant & Bar owned two volleyball teams in the Philippine Super Liga on separate occasions. Those teams were the men's indoor volleyball Sisig Kings and women's beach volleyball Sisig Queens.

Both teams took part in just one tournament in the PSL. The men's team took part in the 2013 Grand Prix Conference, while the women's team took part in the 2015 Beach Volleyball Challenge Cup, with the latter winning a title in that tournament.

== Roster ==
For 2013 PSL Grand Prix Conference:

Giligan's Sisig Kings
No.	Last name	First name	Position	Ht.	Wt.	College	Birth Date
1	Tonquin	Roland		1.88 m (6 ft 2 in)	70 kg	FEU	March 8, 1988 (age 38)
2	Pirante	Warren		1.75 m (5 ft 9 in)	75 kg	Letran	June 4, 1986 (age 39)
3	Depante (c)	Salvador III		1.75 m (5 ft 9 in)	65 kg	UST	October 10, 1991 (age 34)
4	Roque	Reno		1.78 m (5 ft 10 in)	80 kg	UST	January 9, 1987 (age 39)
5	Locquiao	Jack		1.75 m (5 ft 9 in)	77 kg	FEU	December 15, 1986 (age 39)
6	Mabbayad	Edjet		1.83 m (6 ft 0 in)	65 kg	FEU	June 30, 1986 (age 39)
8	Sioson	Julius		1.70 m (5 ft 7 in)	55 kg	UST	July 5, 1991 (age 34)
9	Reyes	Emilio		1.75 m (5 ft 9 in)	70 kg	UST	May 2, 1980 (age 46)
10	Torres	JP		1.85 m (6 ft 1 in)	85 kg	UST	July 19, 1989 (age 36)
11	Chua	Jay		1.65 m (5 ft 5 in)	50 kg	Letran	August 29, 1987 (age 38)
12	Carson	AJ		1.88 m (6 ft 2 in)	80 kg	AUF	December 12, 1983 (age 42)
14	Beliran	Kirk		1.73 m (5 ft 8 in)	75 kg	FEU	March 4, 1990 (age 36)
15	De Ocampo	Pitrus		1.78 m (5 ft 10 in)	78 kg	FEU	June 29, 1991 (age 34)
16	Fernandez	Christian		1.80 m (5 ft 11 in)	77 kg	UST	March 28, 1984 (age 42)

Coaching staff

- Head coach:
  (Philippines) Frank Mauricio
- Assistant coach(s):
  (Philippines) Rommel Abella
  (Philippines) Clarence Esteban

Team staff

- Team manager:
- Team Utility:

Medical Staff

- Team Physician:
- Physical Therapist:

== Honors ==
=== Men's ===
==== Philippine Super Liga ====
Season	Conference	Title	Source
2013	Grand Prix	4th place	

=== Individual ===
Philippine Super Liga:

Season	Conference	Award	Name	Source
2013	Grand Prix	1st Best Outside Spiker	(Philippines) Salvador Depante	

=== Women's ===
Season	Conference	Title	Source
2015	Beach Challenge Cup	Champion	

== Team captain ==
- (Philippines) Salvador Depante (2013)

== See also ==
- Giligan's F.C. (Filipino Premier League football team)
