= Wanitchaya Luangtonglang =

Thai volleyball player

Personal information
- Full name: Wanitchaya Luangtonglang
- Nickname: Pang
- Nationality: Thailand
- Born: October 8, 1992 (age 34) Nakhon Ratchasima, Thailand
- Height: 1.77 m (5 ft 10 in)
- Weight: 69 kg (152 lb)
- Spike: 300 cm (118 in)
- Block: 275 cm (108 in)

Volleyball information
- Position: Outside hitter
- Current club: Nakhon Ratchasima
- Number: 9

National team
- Years: Team
- 2009–2011, 2018: Thailand
Honours
Asian Championship
| Gold medal – first place | 2009 Hanoi |
| Silver medal – second place | 2019 Seoul |
Asian Cup
| Silver medal – second place | 2010 Taicang |
Southeast Asian Games
| Gold medal – first place | 2011 Jakarta/Palembang | Team |

Wanitchaya Luangtonglang (Thai: วณิชยา หล่วงทองหลาง; RTGS: Wanitchaya Luangthonglang, born October 8, 1992) is a member of the Thailand women's national volleyball team.

== Career ==
Luangtonglang won with her U18 team the 2008 Asian Championship Bronze Medal. With her national senior team, she won the 2009 Asian Championship gold medal and the 2010 Asian Cup silver medal.

She is on the list 2019 Korea-Thailand all star super match competition.

== Clubs ==
- (Thailand) Nakhon Ratchasima (2008–)
- (Philippines) TMS-Philippine Army (2013–2014)
- (Indonesia) Jakarta Elektrik (2016)

== Awards ==
=== Individual ===
- 2010–11 Thailand League – "Best scorer"
- 2013 PSL Grand Prix – "Most valuable player"
- 2015–16 Thailand League – "Best scorer"

=== Clubs ===
- 2013 PSL Grand Prix – Champion, with TMS-Philippine Army
- 2013–14 Thailand League – Champion, with Nakhon Ratchasima
- 2017–18 Thailand League – Runner-up, with Nakhon Ratchasima
- 2018–19 Thailand League – Champion, with Nakhon Ratchasima
