= Fourbees Cavite Patriots Total Attackers =

Philippine volleyball team

- Full name: Fourbees Cavite Patriots Total Attackers
- Short name: Fourbees
- Nickname: Total Attackers
- Founded: 2014
- Manager: Tito Monzon
- Captain: Edgardo Rusit (LPC)
- League: Spikers' Turf, Philippine Super Liga
- Spikers' Turf 2015 Open: 7th place
- Website: Club home page

Uniforms
Home	Away

The Fourbees Cavite Patriots Total Attackers were a men's volleyball team in the Philippines owned by Fourbees and representing Cavite. The team first competed in the men's division of the Philippine Super Liga in 2014 before moving to Spikers' Turf when it launched in 2015.

== Final roster ==
Fourbees Cavite Patriots Total Attackers
No.	Last Name	First Name	Position	Ht.	Wt.	College	Birth Date
2	Abcede	Randean					
3	Catipay	Warren					
4	Tanjay	Patrick					
5	Coming	Berwin					
6	Kalingking	Jack					
7	Doliente	Manuel					
8	De Pedro	Jim Ray					
9	Ytorzaita	Neil Barry					
11	Leang	James					
12	Ramos	John Patrick					
14	Barok	Andy Lloyd					
15	Sala-an	Allan Jay					
18	David	Juan Christopher					
19	Sioson	Julius					

Coaching staff

- Head Coach:
  (Philippines) Sinfronio Acaylar
- Assistant Coach(s):
  (Philippines) Sandy Rieta

Team Staff

- Team Manager:
  (Philippines) Ernest Camarillo
- Team Utility:

Medical Staff

- Team Physician:
- Physical Therapist:

== Honors ==
=== Team ===
==== Spikers' Turf ====
Season	Conference	Title	Source
2015	Open Conference	7th place	

==== Philippine Super Liga ====
Season	Conference	Title	Source
2014	Grand Prix	3rd Place	

=== Individual ===
Philippine Super Liga:

Season	Conference	Award	Name	Source
2014	Grand Prix	1st Best Middle Blocker	(Philippines) Antonio Torres	
2014	Grand Prix	Best Setter	(Philippines) Alegro Carpio	

== Team captains ==
- (Philippines) Edgardo Rusit (2014)
