= Via Mare Voyagers =

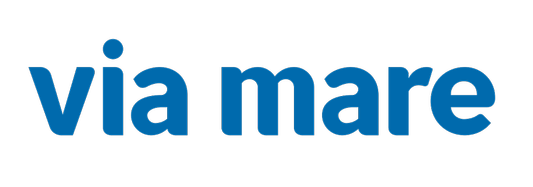
- Full name: Via Mare Voyagers
- Short name: Via Mare
- Nickname: Voyagers
- Founded: 2014
- Captain: Jerrico Hubalde
- League: Philippine Super Liga
- 2014 All-Filipino: 5th place
- Website: Club home page

Uniforms
Home	Away

The Via Mare Voyagers were a men's volleyball team in the Philippines owned by Via Mare Corporation, a restaurant chain. The team played in the Philippine Super Liga (PSL) albeit for just one conference: the 2014 All-Filipino Conference.

== Current roster ==
For the 2014 PSL All-Filipino Conference:

Via Mare Voyagers
No.	Last Name	First Name	Position	Ht.	Wt.	College	Birth Date
1	Martinez	Paolo	Libero	5'10"	70 kg		January 11, 1983 (age 43)
2	Hubalde (c)	Jerrico		6'1"	91 kg	UP	September 15, 1983 (age 42)
3	Cabatingan	Carlo Joshua		5'10"	82 kg	UP	March 11, 1983 (age 43)
4	Paquiz	Samuel Stephen	Opposite Hitter	6'4"	92 kg	UP	June 4, 1983 (age 43)
5	Chuacuco	Hans Christopher		5'10"	71 kg		November 11, 1984 (age 41)
6	Ricafort	Raid Benson		5'10"	75 kg	UP	September 20, 1988 (age 37)
8	Martinez	Jan Paolo		6'0"	76 kg	UP	April 22, 1986 (age 40)
9	Sagad	Mark Justin		5'10"	74 kg	UP	September 9, 1988 (age 37)
10	Pamintuan	Johnal Rey		6'0"	83 kg	UP	January 20, 1990 (age 36)
11	Raymundo	Julius Evan		6'1"	83 kg	UP	February 19, 1994 (age 32)
12	Magtoto	Gerald		5'10"	91 kg	UP	April 12, 1990 (age 36)
15	Belgado	Lloyd Arden		6'0"	77 kg	UP	December 3, 1986 (age 39)
16	Ramos	Giann Carlo		6'0"	73 kg	UP	June 25, 1985 (age 41)
18	Gonzales	Jose Arianne		6'0"	76 kg	UP	January 4, 1990 (age 36)

Coaching staff

- Head Coach:
  (Philippines) Sergio "VIP" Isada
- Assistant Coach(s):
  (Philippines) Andy Fiel

Team Staff

- Team Manager:
- Team Utility:

Medical Staff

- Team Physician:
- Physical Therapist:

== Honors ==
Season	Conference	Title	Source
2014	All-Filipino	5th place	

== Team captain ==
- (Philippines) Jerrico Hubalde (2014)
