= Maybank Tigers =

- Founded: 2013
- Manager: Eric Montelibano
- Captain: Alejandro Niño Mallari
- League: Philippine Super Liga
- 2014 Grand Prix: 4th place

Uniforms
Home	Away

The Maybank Tigers were a men's volleyball team owned by Maybank Philippines. The team competed in the Philippine Super Liga (PSL) from 2013 to 2014 as one of four pioneer teams in the league's men's division.

== Final roster ==
For the 2014 PSL Grand Prix Conference:

Maybank Tigers
No.	Last Name	First Name	Position	Ht.	Wt.	College	Birth Date
1	Brozula	Leandro	Utility Spiker	5'11"	82 kg	Lyceum-Laguna	December 10, 1988 (age 37)
2	Chua	McDavid	Setter	5'9"	70 kg	DLS-CSB	July 22, 1991 (age 34)
3	Dela Peña	Aifrell	Middle Blocker	6'2"	90 kg	DLSU	October 22, 1984 (age 41)
4	Cruz	Evan John Michael	Middle Blocker	6'1"	67 kg	UP	October 30, 1992 (age 33)
5	Bacolod	Van Kristoffer	Outside Hitter	6'1"	91 kg	PUP	March 16, 1985 (age 41)
7	Valdez	John Rys	Outside/Utility	5'9"	57 kg	Letran	October 30, 1992 (age 33)
8	Ucang	Kerr Sherwyn	Setter	5'9"	70 kg	UST	June 23, 1990 (age 35)
9	Locquiao	Jack	Middle Blocker	6'1"	85 kg	FEU	December 12, 1987 (age 38)
10	Marchadesch	Justine	Libero	5'10"	75 kg	DLSU	January 12, 1986 (age 40)
11	Alcarde	Joshua	Outside/Utility	5'8"	70 kg	FEU	February 22, 1988 (age 38)
12	Montillero	Bren Bernard	Outside/Utility	5'10	81 kg	Lyceum-Laguna	April 26, 1991 (age 35)
14	Montierro	Leoven Mark	Libero	5'10"	86 kg	Lyceum-Laguna	August 14, 1991 (age 34)
15	Mallari	Alejandro Niño	Middle Blocker	6'1"	87 kg	DLSU	November 6, 1982 (age 43)
17	Adorador	Jasper Jan	Outside Hitter	5'11"	76 kg	NU	December 6, 1988 (age 37)

Coaching staff

- Head Coach:
  (Philippines) Janley Patrona
- Assistant Coach(s):
  (Philippines) Ken Ucang
  (Philippines) Vic Patrona

Team Staff

- Team Manager:
  (Philippines) Eric Montelibano
- Team Utility:

Medical Staff

- Team Physician:
- Physical Therapist:
  (Philippines) Michael Maglonzo

== Honors ==
=== Team ===
Philippine Super Liga:

Season	Conference	Title	Source
2013	Grand Prix	3rd Place	
2014	All-Filipino	Did not compete	
2014	Grand Prix	4th Place	

=== Individual ===
Philippine Super Liga:

Season	Conference	Award	Name	Source
2013	Grand Prix	2nd Best Outside Spiker	(Philippines) Jasper Adorador	

== Team captains ==
- (Philippines) Michael Maglonzo (2013)
- (Philippines) Alejandro Niňo Mallari (2014)
