= RC Cola–Air Force Raiders =

Philippine women's volleyball team

- Short name: RC Cola
- Nickname: Raiders (2013-2015)
- Founded: 2013
- Manager: Elmer Pabale
- Captain: Tina Salak (FEU)
- League: Philippine Super Liga
- 2015 Grand Prix: 6th place
- Website: Club home page

Uniforms
Home	Away

The RC Cola–Air Force Raiders were a women's volleyball team owned by ARC Refreshments Corporation. The team competed in the Philippine Super Liga from 2013 to 2016, debuting as the RC Cola Raiders before it partnered with the women's volleyball team of the Philippine Air Force to become the Air Force Raiders.

While the team known as the Raiders competed until 2015, in 2016, the Philippine Army Lady Troopers partnered with ARC to form the RC Cola–Army Troopers.

Both teams were named after RC Cola, which ARC is the licensee of in the Philippines.

== Name changes ==
- RC Cola Raiders (2013, Philippine Superliga)
- RC Cola-Air Force Raiders (2014-2015, Philippine Superliga)

== Honors ==
=== Team ===
Season	Conference	Title	Source
2013	Grand Prix	6th place	
2014	All-Filipino	Runner-up	
2014	Grand Prix	3rd place	
2015	All-Filipino	(did not compete)	
2015	Beach Challenge Cup	(did not compete)	
2015	Grand Prix	6th Place	

=== Individual ===
Season	Conference	Award	Name	Source
2014	All-Filipino	Best Outside Spiker	Joy Cases	
2014	All-Filipino	Best Setter	Rhea Dimaculangan	

== Team captains ==
- Ivy Remulla (2013)
- Wendy Anne Semana (2014 All-Filipino)
- Judy Ann Caballejo (2015 Grand Prix)

== Imports ==
Season	Number	Player	Country
2013	3	Minghua Zhang	China
2013	5	Sontaya Keawbundit	Thailand
2014	2	Emily Brown	United States
2014	17	Bonita Wise	United States
2015	12	Sara McClinton	United States
2015	18	Lynda Morales	Puerto Rico

== Coaches ==
- Ronald Dulay (2013)
- Clarence Esteban (2014)
- Rhovyl Verayo (2014-2015)

== Former players ==
Number	Player	Season	Transfer to
2	Jed Montero	2014	
6	Jill Gustilo	2014	Foton Tornadoes
8	Jennifer Manzano	2014	
15	Tony Faye Tan	2014	
17	Southlyn Ramos	2014	

== See also ==
- Philippine Air Force Women's Volleyball Team
- Philippine Army Lady Troopers
