= PCSO Bingo Milyonaryo Puffins =

- Full name: Philippine Charity Sweepstakes Office Bingo Milyonaryo Puffins
- Founded: 2013
- Dissolved: 2013
- Manager: Ronald Dulay
- Captain: Ivy Remulla (DLSU)
- League: Philippine Super Liga
- 2013 Invitational: 6th place

Uniforms
Home	Away

The PCSO Bingo Milyonaryo Puffins were a women's volleyball team in the Philippines owned by the Philippine Charity Sweepstakes Office (PCSO). The team competed in the Philippine Super Liga (PSL), where it was one of the six founding member teams. However, the team only took part in the inaugural 2013 Invitational Conference.

== Roster ==
For the 2013 PSL Invitational Conference:

PCSO Bingo Milyonaryo Puffins
No.	Last Name	First Name	Position	Ht.	Wt.	College	Birth Date
1	Jose	April	Setter		kg	FEU	
2	Tabuena-Cruzada	Cecille			kg	USLS	
3	Magpantay	Hazel			kg	AMA	
4	Mercado	Stephanie	Open Hitter	5'8"	58 kg	DLSU	July 1, 1989 (age 36)
5	Saet	Chie			kg	DLSU	
6	Ortega-Patrona	Iris Renee	Open Hitter		kg	DLSU	
7	Remulla (c)	Ivy Elaine	Middle Hitter		kg	DLSU	
8	Llaguno	Carla			kg	DLSU	
9	Peñano	Shermaine	Libero		kg	DLSU	
10	Penetrante-Ouano	Maureen	Middle Hitter	5'10"	72 kg	DLSU	August 4, 1983 (age 42)
11	Gumabao	Michele Theresa	Opposite Hitter	5'9"1/2	63 kg	DLSU	September 2, 1992 (age 33)
12	Yumang	Giza	Outside Hitter		kg	CSB	
13	Morada	Mecaila Irish May	Outside Hitter	5'8"	50 kg	FEU	
17	Laborte	Michelle	Opposite/Middle Hitter	5'10"	65 kg	USLS	June 14, 1980 (age 45)

Coaching staff

- Head Coach:
  (Philippines) Ronald Dulay
- Assistant Coach(s):

Team Staff

- Team Manager:
- Team Utility:

Medical Staff

- Team Physician:
- Physical Therapist:

== Season-by-season records ==
Season	Conference	Preliminary round	Playoffs	Ranking	Source
2013	Invitational	6th (1–4, 4 pts)	Lost in quarterfinals vs. Petron, 2–3	6th place	
