= Lion Corporation =

Japanese consumer goods company

Lion Corporation ライオン株式会社

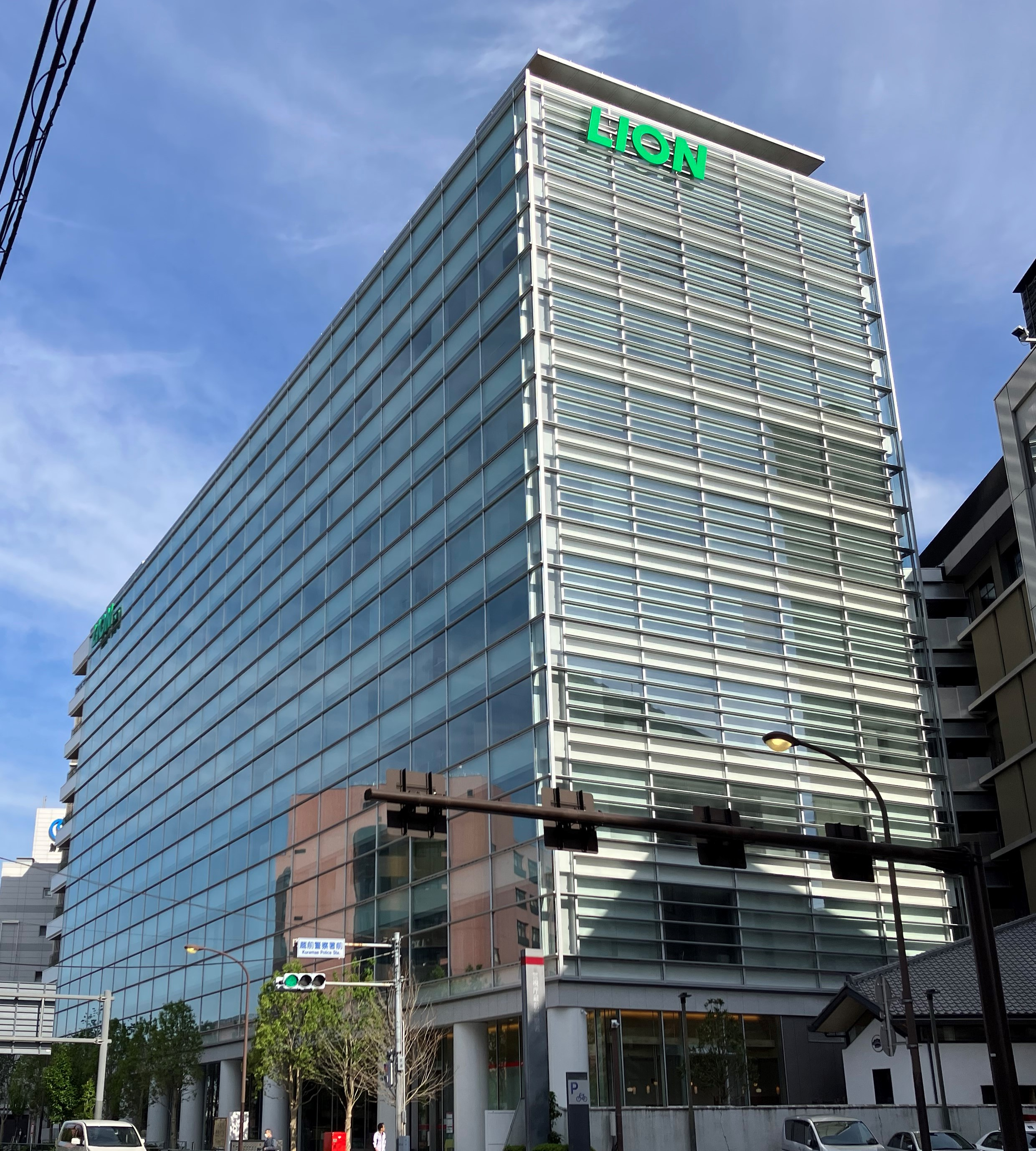
- Lion Corporation headquarters
- Company type: Kabushiki kaisha
- Traded as: TYO: 4912
- Industry: Consumer goods
- Founded: 3 September 1918; 107 years ago
- Founder: Tomijiro Kobayashi
- Headquarters: 3-28, Kuramae Itchome, Taito, Tokyo, Japan 111-8644
- Area served: Worldwide
- Key people: Sadayoshi Fujishige (President)
- Products: Consumer goods
- Revenue: ▲¥331,100 million (December 2010)
- Operating income: ▲¥10,500 million (December 2010)
- Net income: ▲¥6,041 million (December 2010)
- Total assets: ▲¥260,939 million (December 2010)
- Total equity: ▲¥105,760 million (December 2010)
- Number of employees: 5,972 (consolidated, as of December 31, 2010)
- Subsidiaries: PT Lion Wings; Lion Korea; Peerless Lion
- Website: http://www.lion.co.jp/en

Lion Corporation (ライオン株式会社, Raion Kabushiki Gaisha) is a Japanese multinational manufacturer of detergent, soap, medications, and oral hygiene products and other toiletries. The company also has a chemical engineering research division which works on developing new products.

== Subsidiaries ==
- Lion Korea Co., Ltd. (South Korea)
- Lion Corporation (Thailand) Limited
- Southern Lion Sdn. Bhd. (Malaysia, joint venture with Lam Soon Group)
- PT Lion Wings (Indonesia, joint venture with Wings)
- Peerless Lion Corporation (Philippines, joint venture with Peerless Products Manufacturing Corporation)
- Lion Kallol Ltd (A joint venture between LION Corporation Japan and Kallol Limited Bangladesh)
