= 2026–27 Creamline Cool Smashers season =

Filipino women's volleyball team season

The 2026–27 Creamline Cool Smashers season will be the ninth season of the Creamline Cool Smashers in the Premier Volleyball League (PVL), and sixth in professional volleyball.

The Creamline Cool Smashers started their campaign in the PVL on Tour, also known as PVL on Tour Showdown, a four-set victory over the Nxled Chameleons on July 8, 2026 in Ilagan, Isabela.On August 7, 2026, the PVL postponed the August 8, Santiago, Isabela stop doubleheader due to Tropical Depression Maymay, the Cool Smashers supposed to be will play the Capital1 Solar Spikers.Creamline ends their on tour series caravan with a perfect 2–0 record and celebrated with the long-awaited PVL comeback of Jaja Santiago-Minowa, with a straight-set victory over the Galeries Tower Highrisers on August 22, 2026 in Victorias City, Negros Occidental.

In the Invitational Conference, Creamline together with Nxled and PLDT all wound up with identical 3–2 record in the prelims, but the Chameleons grabbed the second finals berth with 10 FIVB tiebreak points. The Cool Smashers settled for third with nine, while the High Speed Hitters finished fourth with eight. Est Cola earlier grabbed the first championship slot due to their superior 4–1 record. The Cool Smashers ultimately lost the bronze medal match to the High Speed Hitters and settled for fourth place in the final standings. It marks only the second time around in their storied franchise history that the Cool Smashers did not settle for a podium finished.

== Roster ==
Creamline Cool Smashers roster
No.	Nat.	Player	Pos.	Height	DOB	From
1	(Philippines)	Kyle Negrito	Setter	1.72 m (5 ft 8 in)	December 15, 1996 (age 29)	Far Eastern
2	(Philippines)	Alyssa Valdez (C)	Outside Hitter	1.74 m (5 ft 9 in)	June 29, 1993 (age 33)	Ateneo
3	(Philippines)	Michelle Gamit	Middle Blocker	1.73 m (5 ft 8 in)	May 9, 2000 (age 26)	St. Benilde
4	(Philippines)	Dij Rodriguez	Opposite Hitter	1.67 m (5 ft 6 in)	August 29, 1996 (age 30)	Southwestern
5	(Philippines)	Sheena Toring	Middle Blocker	1.78 m (5 ft 10 in)	May 28, 2001 (age 25)	National-U
6	(Philippines)	Jeanette Panaga	Middle Blocker	1.78 m (5 ft 10 in)	July 25, 1994 (age 32)	St. Benilde
7	(Philippines)	Michele Gumabao	Opposite Hitter	1.75 m (5 ft 9 in)	September 2, 1992 (age 34)	De La Salle
8	(Philippines)	Ella de Jesus	Libero / Outside Hitter	1.57 m (5 ft 2 in)	August 17, 1993 (age 33)	Ateneo
9	(Philippines)	Lorie Bernardo	Opposite Hitter	1.82 m (6 ft 0 in)	August 1, 2000 (age 26)	UP
10	(Philippines)	Donnalyn Paralejas	Setter	1.59 m (5 ft 3 in)	May 10, 2000 (age 26)	Arellano
11	(Philippines)	Kyla Atienza	Libero	1.67 m (5 ft 6 in)	April 12, 1997 (age 29)	Far Eastern
12	(Philippines)	Jia De Guzman	Setter	1.77 m (5 ft 10 in)	May 15, 1995 (age 31)	Ateneo
13	(Philippines)	Denden Lazaro-Revilla	Libero	1.65 m (5 ft 5 in)	January 21, 1992 (age 34)	Ateneo
14	(Philippines)	Bea de Leon	Middle Blocker	1.80 m (5 ft 11 in)	August 2, 1996 (age 30)	Ateneo
15	(Philippines)	Nica Celis	Middle Blocker	1.78 m (5 ft 10 in)	July 7, 2001 (age 25)	UP
16	(Philippines)	Erin Pangilinan	Middle Blocker	1.70 m (5 ft 7 in)	October 12, 2001 (age 25)	National-U
17	(Philippines)	Rosemarie Vargas	Outside Hitter	1.70 m (5 ft 7 in)	December 12, 1992 (age 33)	Far Eastern
18	(Philippines)	Tots Carlos	Opposite Hitter	1.74 m (5 ft 9 in)	July 7, 1998 (age 28)	UP
19	(Philippines)	Bernadeth Pons	Outside Hitter	1.70 m (5 ft 7 in)	October 19, 1996 (age 30)	Far Eastern
20	(Philippines)	Barbie Jamili	Outside Hitter	1.65 m (5 ft 5 in)	March 15, 2003 (age 23)	Adamson
21	(Philippines)	Ishie Lalongisip	Outside Hitter	1.68 m (5 ft 6 in)	December 30, 2001 (age 24)	Adamson
22	(Philippines)	Jennifer Nierva	Libero	1.66 m (5 ft 5 in)	November 8, 1999 (age 27)	National-U
23	(Philippines)	Jema Galanza	Outside Hitter	1.70 m (5 ft 7 in)	November 28, 1996 (age 29)	Adamson
24	(Philippines) (Canada)	Aleiah Torres	Libero / Outside Hitter	1.63 m (5 ft 4 in)	September 24, 2001 (age 25)	Brock
Updated as of: October 22, 2026 | Source: PVL.ph

Coaching staff

- Head coach:
  Sherwin Meneses
- Assistant coach:
  Karlo Martin Santos
  Ariel Morado Jr.
  Carl Bryan Vitug
  Lawrence Magadia
- Team statistician:
  Mark Alfafara

Team staff

- Team manager:
  Alan Acero
- Team coordinator:
  Maria Carlota Celda
- Trainer:
  Mark Christopher Caron
- Utility:
  Sonny Cruz
  Eduardo Martinez

Medical staff

- Physiotherapist:
  Jonathan Garduque
- Physical therapist:
  Haree Jan Rañeses

== Draft ==
Round	Pick	Player	Pos.	School
1	8	Barbie Jamili	OH	Adamson

== PVL on Tour ==
=== Results summary ===
Team	Game		
Team	1	2	3
Creamline (CCS)	NXL; 3–1	CAP; *Aug. 8	GTH; 3–0

Source: Premier Volleyball League
Legend: Blue = win; Red = loss

== Invitational Conference ==
The Creamline Cool Smashers qualified for the Invitational Conference for winning the finals of the All-Filipino Conference.

=== Preliminary round ===
==== Standings ====
Pos	Team	Pld	W	L	Pts	SW	SL	SR	SPW	SPL	SPR	Qualification
1	Est Cola	5	4	1	11	13	6	2.167	439	434	1.012	Finals
2	Nxled Chameleons	5	3	2	10	12	8	1.500	476	452	1.053	Finals
3	Creamline Cool Smashers	5	3	2	9	12	9	1.333	480	426	1.127	Third place match
4	PLDT High Speed Hitters	5	3	2	8	10	10	1.000	457	437	1.046	Third place match
5	Farm Fresh Foxies	5	1	4	4	7	13	0.538	426	455	0.936	Fifth place match

Source: Premier Volleyball League

==== Match log ====
2026 PVL Invitational Conference preliminary round match log
Total: 3–2 (9 points)
August: 1–0 (3 points)

Match	Date	Opponent	Sets	Total	Location Attendance	Record	Pts	Report
1	August 31, 2026	Nxled	3–1	98–88	Smart Araneta Coliseum; 2,725	1–0	3	P2

September: 2–2 (6 points)

Match	Date	Opponent	Sets	Total	Location Attendance	Record	Pts	Report
2	September 1, 2026	Ho Chi Minh City	3–0	75–40	Smart Araneta Coliseum; 836	2–0	6	P2
3	September 3, 2026	Farm Fresh	3–2	112–95	Smart Araneta Coliseum; 850	3–0	8	P2
4	September 4, 2026	Est Cola	1–3	93–94	Smart Araneta Coliseum; 1,621	3–1	8	P2
5	September 6, 2026	PLDT	2–3	102–109	Smart Araneta Coliseum; 4,081	3–2	9	P2

=== Final round ===
==== Match log ====
2026 PVL Invitational Conference final round match log
Total: 0–1 (0 point)
Third-place match: 0–1 (0 point)

Date	Opponent	Sets	Total	Location Attendance	Report
September 8, 2026	PLDT	1–3	88–95	Smart Araneta Coliseum; 1,575	P2

== All-Filipino Conference ==
=== Preliminary round ===
==== Standings ====
Pos	Team	Pld	W	L	Pts	SW	SL	SR	SPW	SPL	SPR	Qualification
1	Nxled Chameleons	8	8	0	23	24	6	4.000	713	608	1.173	Twice-to-beat in semifinals
2	Creamline Cool Smashers	8	5	3	16	19	11	1.727	701	641	1.094	Twice-to-beat in semifinals
3	Choco Mucho Flying Titans	8	5	3	15	20	15	1.333	783	736	1.064	Twice-to-win in semifinals
4	Farm Fresh Foxies	8	5	3	14	19	16	1.188	758	755	1.004	Twice-to-win in semifinals
5	PLDT High Speed Hitters	8	4	4	13	15	15	1.000	677	666	1.017	

Source: Premier Volleyball League

==== Match log ====
2026–27 PVL All-Filipino Conference Siklab series preliminary round match log
Total: 5–3 (16 points)
October: 4–0 (12 points)

Match	Date	Opponent	Sets	Total	Location Attendance	Record	Pts	Report
1	October 10, 2026	Akari	3–0	75–57	SM Seaside Cebu Arena; 19,106	1–0	3	P2
2	October 17, 2026	Galeries Tower	3–1	102–84	Filoil Centre; 1,497	2–0	6	P2
3	October 24, 2026	Zus Coffee	3–1	92–85	Filoil Centre; 2,441	3–0	9	P2
4	October 29, 2026	Capital1	3–0	81–63	Santiago City Sports Arena; 3,766	4–0	12	P2

November: 1–3 (4 points)

Match	Date	Opponent	Sets	Total	Location Attendance	Record	Pts	Report
5	November 5, 2026	PLDT	1–3	92–100	PhilSports Arena; 2,011	4–1	12	P2
6	November 12, 2026	Choco Mucho	2–3	99–110	Smart Araneta Coliseum; 5,663	4–2	13	P2
7	November 17, 2026	Nxled	1–3	85–87	PhilSports Arena; 2,174	4–3	13	P2
8	November 21, 2026	Farm Fresh	3–0	75–55	PhilSports Arena; 1,870	5–3	16	P2

== Transactions ==
=== Additions ===
Player	Date signed	Previous team	Ref.
Erin Pangilinan	May 19, 2026	Cignal Super Spikers	
Ishie Lalongisip	June 1, 2026	Cignal Super Spikers	
Donnalyn Paralejas	June 22, 2026	Petro Gazz Angels	
Barbie Jamili	July 6, 2026	Adamson (UAAP)	
Jaja Santiago	August 7, 2026	Denso Airybees (SV.League)	

=== Subtractions ===
Player	New team	Ref.
Jaja Santiago	San Francisco Signal (LOVB Pro)	
