= 2024–25 Creamline Cool Smashers season =

Seventh season of the Creamline Cool Smashers

The 2024–25 Creamline Cool Smashers season was the seventh season of the Creamline Cool Smashers in the Premier Volleyball League (PVL). This was Creamline's first season without former Finals MVP Celine Domingo, who had been with the team since 2019. She signed with the Akari Chargers on January 6, 2024. That same day, the team acquired Bea de Leon and Denden Lazaro-Revilla from sister team Choco Mucho Flying Titans. They then added Dij Rodriguez from their beach volleyball team to the roster.

The Cool Smashers entered the 2024 All-Filipino Conference with a 15-game winning streak, which was later extended to 19 games as they started 4–0. On March 16, 2024, the team was swept by the Chery Tiggo Crossovers, putting an end to that winning streak and resulting in their first loss since the 2023 Invitational Conference championship. They finished fourth in the preliminary round with an 8–3 record and 24 points, beating the PLDT High Speed Hitters by one point in the standings to advance to the semifinals. On May 5, with a 3–0 win against Chery Tiggo, Creamline advanced to the championship, settling for second with a 2–1 record and 7 points. The team was met with a 2023 Second All-Filipino Conference rematch against Choco Mucho. They then swept their sister team, 2–0, to win their eight PVL title and sixth All-Filipino Conference title.

Despite an early five-set loss to PLDT to start the Reinforced Conference, Creamline pushed through winning six of the remaining seven games in the split preliminary round, finishing third with a 6–2 record and 20 points. After sweeping rivals Petro Gazz Angels in the quarterfinals, the team was met with a challenge against the Cignal HD Spikers in the semifinals. Cignal beat Creamline in the first two sets before the Cool Smashers completed a comeback, reverse sweeping the HD Spikers to take on championship debutant Akari. Although Akari were 10–0 leading up to the title match, Creamline was able to sweep the Chargers and claim their ninth PVL title and third consecutive title. It was also the team's first Reinforced Conference title since 2018.

Creamline were one of three PVL teams which competed in the Invitational Conference. On September 9, with a 3–1 win against Cignal, Creamline clinched a berth into the conference championship. They then beat the Farm Fresh Foxies two days later to complete a 4–0 preliminary round sweep with the full 12 points. In the championship, they would once against face off with the HD Spikers. The opponents once again brought them to the brink of defeat, leading 2–1 after three sets, but in the next two sets, Creamline would beat Cignal by two points in both sets. With their fourth consecutive title and second Invitational Conference triumph, Creamline became the first PVL team to win ten championships and accomplish the league's first-ever Grand Slam.

In the 2024–25 All-Filipino Conference, Creamline continued their winning prowess by going 9–0 through their first nine matches. Midway through, Filipino-Japanese player Risa Sato, who was with the team since 2018, transferred to the Chery Tiggo Crossovers on January 15, 2025. On February 15, the team was dealt with their only defeat to the PLDT High Speed Hitters, ending a winning streak that lasted 19 matches starting with the 2024 Reinforced Conference. On February 20, with a win against Galeries Tower Highrisers, Creamline clinched first place in the preliminary round. They first swept the Nxled Chameleons in the qualifying round to clinch a berth into the final round. The Cool Smashers then swept Chery Tiggo in the quarterfinals to advance to the round-robin semifinals. On April 3, Creamline won against sister team Choco Mucho Flying Titans to clinch their seventh consecutive championship berth. Creamline would face off against the Petro Gazz Angels, contesting the title between the two teams for the fifth time in their rivalry. Creamline weren't able to outlast Petro Gazz this time around, losing to the Angels in three matches, thus putting an end to their reign of four consecutive titles.

The team then took part in the 2025 AVC Women's Volleyball Champions League. They first got a win against Jordan's Al Naser Club before losing to Zhetysu VC of Kazakhstan. Still, it was enough to clinch second in Pool A and booking a spot in the quarterfinals, where they would lose to Nakhon Ratchasima and were eliminated from the tournament.

== Roster ==
Creamline Cool Smashers
No.	Player	Position	Height	Birth date	School
1	(Philippines) Kyle Negrito	Setter	1.72 m (5 ft 8 in)	December 15, 1996 (age 29)	Far Eastern University
2	(Philippines) Alyssa Valdez (C)	Outside Hitter	1.74 m (5 ft 9 in)	June 29, 1993 (age 33)	Ateneo de Manila University
4	(Philippines) Floremel Rodriguez	Opposite Hitter	1.70 m (5 ft 7 in)	August 29, 1996 (age 30)	Southwestern University
6	(Philippines) Jeanette Panaga	Middle Blocker	1.78 m (5 ft 10 in)	July 25, 1994 (age 32)	College of Saint Benilde
7	(Philippines) Michele Gumabao	Opposite Hitter	1.75 m (5 ft 9 in)	September 2, 1992 (age 34)	De La Salle University
8	(Philippines) Ella de Jesus	Libero/Outside Hitter	1.57 m (5 ft 2 in)	August 17, 1993 (age 33)	Ateneo de Manila University
9	(Philippines) Lorie Bernardo	Middle Blocker	1.82 m (6 ft 0 in)	August 1, 2000 (age 26)	University of the Philippines
10	(Philippines) Pau Soriano	Middle blocker	1.70 m (5 ft 7 in)	December 31, 1991 (age 34)	Adamson University
11	(Philippines) Kyla Atienza	Libero	1.67 m (5 ft 6 in)	April 12, 1997 (age 29)	Far Eastern University
13	(Philippines) Denden Lazaro-Revilla	Libero	1.65 m (5 ft 5 in)	January 21, 1992 (age 34)	Ateneo De Manila University
14	(Philippines) Bea de Leon	Middle Blocker	1.80 m (5 ft 11 in)	August 2, 1996 (age 30)	Ateneo De Manila University
15	(Philippines) Theo Bea Bonafe	Setter	1.73 m (5 ft 8 in)	December 31, 2001 (age 24)	University of the Philippines
16	(Philippines) Rizza Mandapat	Opposite Hitter	1.73 m (5 ft 8 in)	February 28, 1994 (age 32)	National University
17	(Philippines) Rosemarie Vargas	Outside Hitter	1.70 m (5 ft 7 in)	December 12, 1992 (age 33)	Far Eastern University
18	(Philippines) Tots Carlos	Opposite Hitter	1.74 m (5 ft 9 in)	July 7, 1998 (age 28)	University of the Philippines
19	(Philippines) Bernadeth Pons	Outside Hitter	1.70 m (5 ft 7 in)	October 19, 1996 (age 29)	Far Eastern University
20	(Philippines) Mafe Galanza	Setter	1.65 m (5 ft 5 in)	May 11, 2000 (age 26)	University of Santo Tomas
23	(Philippines) Jema Galanza	Outside Hitter	1.70 m (5 ft 7 in)	November 28, 1996 (age 29)	Adamson University
24	(Philippines) (Canada) Aleiah Torres	Outside Hitter/Libero	1.63 m (5 ft 4 in)	September 24, 2001 (age 24)	Brock University

Coaching staff

- Head coach:
  Sherwin Meneses
- Assistant coach:
  Karlo Martin Santos
  Ariel Morado Jr.
  John Paul Pareja
  Lawrence Magadia

Team staff

- Team manager:
  Alan Acero
- Trainer:
  Mark Christopher Caron
- Utility:
  Sonny Cruz
  Eduardo Martinez

Medical staff

- Physiothrapist:
  Jigs Daguque
- Physical therapist:
  Haree Jan Rañeses

== 2024 All-Filipino Conference ==
=== Preliminary round ===
==== Standings ====
Pos	Team	Pld	W	L	Pts	SW	SL	SR	SPW	SPL	SPR	Qualification
2	Choco Mucho Flying Titans	11	9	2	26	29	11	2.636	921	771	1.195	Final round
3	Chery Tiggo Crossovers	11	9	2	25	28	11	2.545	899	781	1.151	Final round
4	Creamline Cool Smashers	11	8	3	24	27	13	2.077	946	831	1.138	Final round
5	PLDT High Speed Hitters	11	8	3	23	25	12	2.083	859	726	1.183	
6	Cignal HD Spikers	11	7	4	22	23	14	1.643	869	747	1.163	

Source: TeamPilipinas.info

==== Match log ====
2024 PVL All-Filipino Conference preliminary round match log
Total: 8–3 (24 points)
February: 2–0 (6 points)

Match	Date	Opponent	Sets	Total	Location Attendance	Record	Pts	Report
1	February 24, 2024	Farm Fresh	3–1	109–96	Smart Araneta Coliseum; 3,168	1–0	3	P2
2	February 29, 2024	Akari	3–1	96–88	PhilSports Arena; 2,544	2–0	6	P2

March: 4–1 (11 points)

Match	Date	Opponent	Sets	Total	Location Attendance	Record	Pts	Report
3	March 7, 2024	Galeries Tower	3–0	75–54	PhilSports Arena; 964	3–0	9	P2
4	March 12, 2024	Strong Group	3–0	75–45	PhilSports Arena; 722	4–0	12	P2
5	March 16, 2024	Chery Tiggo	0–3	65–76	Santa Rosa Sports Complex; 4,711	4–1	12	P2
6	March 21, 2024	Capital1	3–0	75–47	Smart Araneta Coliseum; 1,207	5–1	15	P2
7	March 26, 2024	Cignal	3–2	114–110	PhilSports Arena; 2,992	6–1	17	P2

April: 2–2 (7 points)

Match	Date	Opponent	Sets	Total	Location Attendance	Record	Pts	Report
8	April 6, 2024	Petro Gazz	2–3	101–104	Santa Rosa Sports Complex; 5,928	6–2	18	P2
9	April 13, 2024	Nxled	3–0	75–54	PhilSports Arena; 3,978	7–2	21	P2
10	April 18, 2024	Choco Mucho	3–0	75–58	Smart Araneta Coliseum; 17,396	8–2	24	P2
11	April 25, 2024	PLDT	1–3	86–99	PhilSports Arena; 3,546	8–3	24	P2

=== Final round ===
==== Semifinals standings ====
Pos	Team	Pld	W	L	Pts	SW	SL	SR	SPW	SPL	SPR	Qualification
1	Choco Mucho Flying Titans	3	3	0	8	9	3	3.000	274	257	1.066	Championship
2	Creamline Cool Smashers	3	2	1	7	8	4	2.000	285	256	1.113	Championship
3	Petro Gazz Angels	3	1	2	3	5	7	0.714	282	279	1.011	3rd place
4	Chery Tiggo Crossovers	3	0	3	0	1	9	0.111	196	245	0.800	3rd place

Source: TeamPilipinas.info

==== Match log ====
2024 PVL All-Filipino Conference final round match log
Total: 4–1 (12 points)
Semifinals: 2–1 (7 points)

Match	Date	Opponent	Sets	Total	Location Attendance	Record	Pts	Report
1	April 30, 2024	Choco Mucho	2–3	107–100	PhilSports Arena; 5,294	0–1	1	P2
2	May 2, 2024	Petro Gazz	3–1	103–99	PhilSports Arena; 4,337	1–1	4	P2
3	May 5, 2024	Chery Tiggo	3–0	75–57	Smart Araneta Coliseum; 17,834	2–1	7	P2

Championship: 2–0 (5 points)

Match	Date	Opponent	Sets	Total	Location Attendance	Series	Report
1	May 9, 2024	Choco Mucho	3–1	99–83	Smart Araneta Coliseum; 17,457	1–0	P2
2	May 12, 2024	Choco Mucho	3–2	107–103	Smart Araneta Coliseum; 23,162	2–0	P2

== Draft ==
Round	Pick	Player	Position	School
1	12	Aleiah Torres	L/OH	Brock

The Creamline Cool Smashers selected Aleiah Torres with the 12th pick before passing during the second round.

== Reinforced Conference ==
=== Preliminary round ===
==== Standings ====
Pos	Team	Pld	W	L	Pts	SW	SL	SR	SPW	SPL	SPR	Qualification
1	Akari Chargers	8	8	0	21	24	9	2.667	686	618	1.110	Quarterfinals
2	Cignal HD Spikers	8	7	1	20	22	8	2.750	648	562	1.153	Quarterfinals
3	Creamline Cool Smashers	8	6	2	20	22	9	2.444	744	653	1.139	Quarterfinals
4	PLDT High Speed Hitters	8	6	2	19	22	9	2.444	713	622	1.146	Quarterfinals
5	Chery Tiggo Crossovers	8	5	3	15	18	12	1.500	649	635	1.022	Quarterfinals

Source: Premier Volleyball League

==== Match log ====
2024 PVL Reinforced Conference preliminary round match log
Total: 6–2 (20 points)
July: 2–1 (7 points)

Match	Date	Opponent	Sets	Total	Location Attendance	Record	Pts	Report
1	July 16, 2024	PLDT	2–3	104–105	Smart Araneta Coliseum; 2,660	0–1	1	P2
2	July 20, 2024	Farm Fresh	3–1	99–86	PhilSports Arena; 1,991	1–1	4	P2
3	July 30, 2024	Chery Tiggo	3–1	99–81	PhilSports Arena; 1,820	2–1	7	P2

August: 4–1 (13 points)

Match	Date	Opponent	Sets	Total	Location Attendance	Record	Pts	Report
4	August 3, 2024	Galeries Tower	3–1	107–9	PhilSports Arena; 1,714	3–1	10	P2
5	August 8, 2024	Nxled	3–0	75–56	PhilSports Arena; 822	4–1	13	P2
6	August 13, 2024	Petro Gazz	2–3	104–108	PhilSports Arena; 1,464	4–2	14	P2
7	August 17, 2024	Choco Mucho	3–0	81–64	SM Mall of Asia Arena; 9,429	5–2	17	P2
8	August 22, 2024	Zus Coffee	3–0	75–54	Filoil EcoOil Centre; 919	6–2	20	P2

=== Final round ===
==== Bracket ====
Quarterfinals
August 24
1 Akari	3
8 Farm Fresh	1
August 27
4 PLDT	3
5 Chery Tiggo	2
August 24
2 Cignal	3
7 Capital1	2
August 27
3 Creamline	3
6 Petro Gazz	0

Semifinals
August 31
Akari	3
PLDT	2
August 31
Cignal	2
Creamline	3

Championship
September 4
Akari	0
Creamline	3
3rd place match
September 4
PLDT	1
Cignal	3

==== Match log ====
2024 PVL Reinforced Conference final round match log
Total: 3–0 (8 points)
Quarterfinals: 1–0 (3 points)

Date	Opponent	Sets	Total	Location Attendance	Report
August 27, 2024	Petro Gazz	3–0	75–60	Filoil EcoOil Centre; 2,498	P2

Semifinals: 1–0 (2 points)

Date	Opponent	Sets	Total	Location Attendance	Report
August 31, 2024	Cignal	3–2	113–109	SM Mall of Asia Arena; 11,438	P2

Championship: 1–0 (3 points)

Date	Opponent	Sets	Total	Location Attendance	Report
September 4, 2024	Akari	3–0	75–55	PhilSports Arena; 8,289	P2

== Invitational Conference ==
The Creamline Cool Smashers qualified for the Invitational Conference for reaching the semifinals of the Reinforced Conference.

=== Preliminary round ===
==== Standings ====
Pos	Team	Pld	W	L	Pts	SW	SL	SR	SPW	SPL	SPR	Qualification
1	Creamline Cool Smashers	4	4	0	12	12	2	6.000	347	270	1.285	Championship match
2	Cignal HD Spikers	4	3	1	8	10	5	2.000	348	307	1.134	Championship match
3	Kurashiki Ablaze	4	2	2	7	9	7	1.286	373	364	1.025	3rd place match
4	Est Cola	4	1	3	2	4	11	0.364	292	352	0.830	3rd place match
5	Farm Fresh Foxies	4	0	4	1	2	12	0.167	238	333	0.715	

Source: Premier Volleyball League

==== Match log ====
2024 PVL Invitational Conference preliminary round match log
Total: 4–0 (12 points)
September: 4–0 (12 points)

Match	Date	Opponent	Sets	Total	Location Attendance	Record	Pts	Report
1	September 6, 2024	Est Cola	3–0	75–40	Santa Rosa Sports Complex; 964	1–0	3	P2
2	September 8, 2024	Kurashiki	3–1	101–93	SM Mall of Asia Arena; 2,322	2–0	6	P2
3	September 9, 2024	Cignal	3–1	96–90	SM Mall of Asia Arena; 1,214	3–0	9	P2
4	September 11, 2024	Farm Fresh	3–0	75–47	PhilSports Arena; 551	4–0	12	P2

=== Final round ===
==== Match log ====
2024 PVL Invitational Conference final round match log
Total: 1–0 (2 points)
Championship: 1–0 (2 points)

Date	Opponent	Sets	Total	Location Attendance	Report
September 12, 2024	Cignal	3–2	107–104	Smart Araneta Coliseum; 3,211	P2

== 2024–25 All-Filipino Conference ==
=== Preliminary round ===
==== Standings ====
Pos	Team	Pld	W	L	Pts	SW	SL	SR	SPW	SPL	SPR	Qualification
1	Creamline Cool Smashers	11	10	1	29	32	8	4.000	970	816	1.189	2025 AVC Women's Champions League and Qualifying round
2	Petro Gazz Angels	11	10	1	29	30	8	3.750	909	770	1.181	2025 AVC Women's Champions League and Qualifying round
3	Cignal HD Spikers	11	8	3	25	27	12	2.250	909	794	1.145	Qualifying round
4	PLDT High Speed Hitters	11	8	3	23	27	13	2.077	927	842	1.101	Qualifying round
5	Choco Mucho Flying Titans	11	8	3	20	27	20	1.350	1064	1031	1.032	Qualifying round

Source: Premier Volleyball League

==== Match log ====
2024–25 PVL All-Filipino Conference preliminary round match log
Total: 10–1 (29 points)
November: 2–0 (6 points)

Match	Date	Opponent	Sets	Total	Location Attendance	Record	Pts	Report
1	November 16, 2024	Petro Gazz	3–0	75–57	Ynares Center; 5,900	1–0	3	P2
2	November 23, 2024	Akari	3–0	76–57	Candon City Arena; 6,187	2–0	6	P2

December: 2–0 (5 points)

Match	Date	Opponent	Sets	Total	Location Attendance	Record	Pts	Report
3	December 3, 2024	Choco Mucho	3–1	105–94	Smart Araneta Coliseum; 9,551	3–0	9	P2
4	December 12, 2024	Zus Coffee	3–2	111–114	PhilSports Arena; 2,299	4–0	11	P2

January: 2–0 (6 points)

Match	Date	Opponent	Sets	Total	Location Attendance	Record	Pts	Report
5	January 21, 2025	Capital1	3–0	75–56	PhilSports Arena; 1,713	5–0	14	P2
6	January 28, 2025	Nxled Chameleons	3–0	75–52	PhilSports Arena; 1,143	6–0	17	P2

February: 4–1 (12 points)

Match	Date	Opponent	Sets	Total	Location Attendance	Record	Pts	Report
7	February 1, 2025	Cignal	3–2	112–102	PhilSports Arena; 4,603	7–0	19	P2
8	February 6, 2025	Chery Tiggo	3–0	75–55	PhilSports Arena; 1,931	8–0	22	P2
9	February 11, 2025	Farm Fresh	3–0	77–59	PhilSports Arena; 1,798	9–0	25	P2
10	February 15, 2025	PLDT	2–3	113–112	Ynares Center; 5,055	9–1	26	P2
11	February 20, 2025	Galeries Tower	3–0	76–58	PhilSports Arena; 1,100	10–1	29	P2

=== Qualifying round ===
==== Match log ====
2024–25 PVL All-Filipino Conference qualifying round match log
Total: 1–0 (3 points)
Qualifying round: 1–0 (3 points)

Date	Opponent	Sets	Total	Location Attendance	Report
February 27, 2025	Nxled	3–0	75–52	PhilSports Arena; 1,471	P2

=== Final round ===
==== Bracket ====
Quarterfinals
1	Creamline	2
8	Chery Tiggo	0
2	Petro Gazz	2
7	Zus Coffee	1
3	Galeries Tower	0
6	Akari	2
4	PLDT	0
5	Choco Mucho	2

Semifinals
Creamline	6
Petro Gazz	9
Choco Mucho	1
Akari	2

Finals
Championship
Creamline	1
Petro Gazz	2
Third-place
Choco Mucho	1
Akari	2

===== Semifinals standings =====
Pos	Team	Pld	W	L	Pts	SW	SL	SR	SPW	SPL	SPR	Qualification
1	Petro Gazz Angels	3	3	0	9	9	2	4.500	272	232	1.172	Championship
2	Creamline Cool Smashers	3	2	1	6	7	3	2.333	236	201	1.174	Championship
3	Akari Chargers	3	1	2	2	3	8	0.375	224	256	0.875	3rd place
4	Choco Mucho Flying Titans	3	0	3	1	3	9	0.333	241	284	0.849	3rd place

Source: Premier Volleyball League

==== Match log ====
2024–25 PVL All-Filipino Conference final round match log
Total: 5–3 (15 points)
Quarterfinals: 2–0 (6 points)

Match	Date	Opponent	Sets	Total	Location Attendance	Series	Report
1	March 18, 2025	Chery Tiggo	3–0	77–56	PhilSports Arena; 1,783	1–0	P2
2	March 22, 2025	Chery Tiggo	3–1	95–90	Ynares Center Antipolo; 4,409	2–0	P2

Semifinals: 2–1 (6 points)

Match	Date	Opponent	Sets	Total	Location Attendance	Record	Pts	Report
1	March 29, 2025	Petro Gazz	1–3	86–96	Ynares Center Antipolo; 8,360	0–1	0	P2
2	April 1, 2025	Akari	3–0	75–56	PhilSports Arena; 6,152	1–1	3	P2
3	April 3, 2025	Choco Mucho	3–0	75–49	Smart Araneta Coliseum; 7,347	2–1	6	P2

Championship: 1–2 (3 points)

Match	Date	Opponent	Sets	Total	Location Attendance	Series	Report
1	April 8, 2025	Petro Gazz	2–3	97–103	Smart Araneta Coliseum; 8,841	0–1	P2
2	April 10, 2025	Petro Gazz	3–2	96–95	Smart Araneta Coliseum; 9,058	1–1	P2
3	April 12, 2025	Petro Gazz	1–3	81–98	PhilSports Arena; 10,226	1–2	P2

== AVC Women's Volleyball Champions League ==
=== Preliminary round ===
==== Match log ====
Date	Time		Score		Set 1	Set 2	Set 3	Set 4	Set 5	Total	Report
Apr 20	16:00	Creamline Cool Smashers (Philippines)	3–0	(Jordan) Al Naser Club	29–27	25–20	25–19			79–66	P2 Report
Apr 21	19:00	Zhetysu VC (Kazakhstan)	3–0	(Philippines) Creamline Cool Smashers	25–16	25–17	25–17			75–50	P2 Report

=== Final round ===
==== Quarterfinals ====
Date	Time		Score		Set 1	Set 2	Set 3	Set 4	Set 5	Total	Report
Apr 24	19:00	Creamline Cool Smashers (Philippines)	0–3	(Thailand) Nakhon Ratchasima Qmin C VC	15–25	22–25	16–25			53–75	P2 Report

== Transactions ==
=== Additions ===
Player	Date signed	Previous team	Ref.
Bea de Leon	January 6, 2024	Choco Mucho Flying Titans	
Denden Lazaro-Revilla	January 6, 2024	Choco Mucho Flying Titans	
Dij Rodriguez	February 13, 2024	Creamline Beach Volleyball (Beach Volleyball)	
Aleiah Torres	July 10, 2024	Brock Badgers (OUA)	

=== Subtractions ===
Player	New team	Ref.
Celine Domingo	Akari Chargers	
Risa Sato	Chery Tiggo Crossovers	

=== Foreign guest player ===
Team	Foreign player	Moving from	Ref.
Creamline Cool Smashers	(United States) Erica Staunton	(Finland) Oriveden Ponnistus	
