= List of Creamline Cool Smashers seasons =

The Creamline Cool Smashers were established in 2017 as one of the original members of the Premier Volleyball League. In 2021, the team turned pro. Creamline is the most successful team in the league, with ten titles and a podium streak that lasted 19 conferences from the team's establishment through 2025.

== Records per conference ==
Note: Statistics are correct as of the end of the 2026 Premier Volleyball League Invitational Conference.

Season	Conference	Preliminary round	Knockout rounds	Ranking	Source
2017	Reinforced	5th (4–6, 14 pts)	Finished 2nd in quarterfinals (2–1, 6 pts); Lost in semifinals vs. BaliPure, 1–2; Won in third place series vs. Power Smashers, 2–0	3rd place	
2017	Open	1st (7–0, 20 pts)	Lost in semifinals vs. BaliPure, 1–2; Won in third place series vs. Philippine Air Force, 2–0	3rd place	
2018	Reinforced	1st (6–1, 19 pts)	Won in semifinals vs. Pocari Sweat–Air Force, 2–1; Won in finals vs. PayMaya, 2–0	Champions	
2018	Open	1st (11–3, 34 pts)	Won in semifinals vs. Petro Gazz, 2–0; Won in finals vs. Ateneo–Motolite, 2–0	Champions	
2019	Reinforced	2nd (9–1, 27 pts)	Won in semifinals vs. PacificTown–Army; Lost in finals vs. Petro Gazz, 1–2	Runner-up	
2019	Open	1st (16–0, 48 pts)	Won in semifinals vs. Motolite, 2–0; Won in finals vs. Petro Gazz, 2–0	Champions	
2021 (team)	Open	1st (8–1, 21 pts)	Won in semifinals vs. Petro Gazz; Lost in finals vs. Chery Tiggo, 1–2	Runner-up	
2022 (team)	Open	1st (3–0, 8 pts) (Pool B)	Won in quarterfinals vs. Chery Tiggo, 3–1 (Note: Team had twice-to-beat advantage.); Won in semifinals vs. Choco Mucho, 2–0; Won in finals vs. Petro Gazz, 2–0	Champions	
2022 (team)	Invitational	1st (5–1, 15 pts)	Finished 2nd in semifinals (3–1, 9 pts); Won in finals vs. KingWhale Taipei, 3–0	Champions	
2022 (team)	Reinforced	1st (7–1, 22 pts)	Finished 3rd in semifinals (2–1, 5 pts); Won in third place series vs. Chery Tiggo, 2–0	3rd place	
2023 (team)	First All-Filipino	1st (7–1, 22 pts)	Won in semifinals vs. F2 Logistics, 2–0; Won in finals vs. Petro Gazz, 2–1	Champions	
2023 (team)	Invitational	1st (4–0, 12 pts) (Pool A)	Finished second in semifinals (4–1, 10 pts); Lost in finals vs. Kurashiki, 2–3	Runner-up	
2023 (team)	Second All-Filipino	1st (11–0, 32 pts)	Won in semifinals vs. Chery Tiggo, 2–0; Won in finals vs. Choco Mucho, 2–0	Champions	
2024–25 (team)	All-Filipino	4th (8–3, 24 pts)	Finished 2nd in semifinals (2–1, 7 pts); Won in finals vs. Choco Mucho, 2–0	Champions	
2024–25 (team)	Reinforced	3rd (6–2, 20 pts)	Won in quarterfinals vs. Petro Gazz, 3–0; Won in semifinals vs. Cignal, 3–2; Won in finals vs. Akari, 3–0	Champions	
2024–25 (team)	Invitational	1st (4–0, 12 pts)	Won in finals vs. Cignal, 3–2	Champions	
2024–25 (team)	All-Filipino	1st (10–1, 29 pts)	Won in quarterfinals vs. Chery Tiggo, 2–0; Finished 2nd in semifinals (2–1, 6 pts); Lost in finals vs. Petro Gazz, 1–2	Runner-up	
2025–26 (team)	PVL on Tour	2nd (3–2, 10 pts) (Pool B)	Won in quarterfinals vs. Farm Fresh, 3–0; Lost in semifinals vs. PLDT, 2–3; Won in third place match vs. Cignal, 3–0	3rd place	
2025–26 (team)	Invitational	4th (2–3, 5 pts)	Won in third place match vs. Chery Tiggo, 3–0	3rd place	
2025–26 (team)	Reinforced	4th (5–3, 17 pts)	Lost in quarterfinals vs. Petro Gazz, 1–3	6th place	
2025–26 (team)	All-Filipino	3rd (6–3, 16 pts)	Lost in qualifying vs. Cignal, 2–3; Won in Play-in final (Pool B) vs. Akari, 3–1; Finished 2nd in semifinals (2–1, 5 pts); Won in finals vs. Cignal, 2–0	Champions	
2026–27 (team)	Invitational	3rd (3–2, 9 pts)	Lost in third place match vs. PLDT, 1–3	4th place	
