= 2025 Premier Volleyball League Invitational Conference =

Second conference of the 2024–25 PVL season

- Duration: August 21–31, 2025
- Teams: 6
- Matches: 15
- TV partner(s): One Sports; One Sports+; RPTV
- Streaming partner(s): Pilipinas Live

Results
- Champions: PLDT High Speed Hitters
- Runners-up: Kobe Shinwa University
- Third place: Creamline Cool Smashers
- Fourth place: Chery Tiggo Crossovers

Awards
- Conference MVP: Savi Davison
- Finals MVP: Kath Arado
- Best OH: Jema Galanza; Nagisa Komatsuda
- Best MB: Jeanette Panaga; Rizza Nogales
- Best OPP: Ara Galang
- Best Setter: Sakura Furuta
- Best Libero: Kath Arado

PVL Invitational Conference chronology
- < 2024 2026 >

PVL conference chronology
- < 2024–25 All-Filipino 2025 Reinforced >
- < 2025 PVL on Tour (preseason)

The 2025 Premier Volleyball League Invitational Conference was the first conference of the 2025–26 Premier Volleyball League season and the second tournament of the season. The fourth Invitational Conference runs from August 21 to 31, 2025 and featured five of the league's local teams alongside one foreign guest team. The tournament was initially set to start on August 19, two days before its current schedule.

The PLDT High Speed Hitters won the conference after beating the guest team Kobe Shinwa University in the championship match in four sets, giving them back-to-back gold medals following their preseason triumph. The Creamline Cool Smashers swept the Chery Tiggo Crossovers in the 3rd medal match to complete the podium and retain their streak of nineteen consecutive podium finishes.

== Qualification ==
The 2025 Invitational Conference follows the same format as the 2024 edition. It is a smaller-scale tournament where only a selection of teams will qualify based on performance from the previous conference.

Four slots were allocated for the semifinalists of the 2025 PVL on Tour. These were Chery Tiggo Crossovers, Cignal HD Spikers, Creamline Cool Smashers, and PLDT High Speed Hitters. As part of the Invitational Conference, the league invited two foreign guest teams to compete. The Kurashiki Ablaze and Kobe Shinwa University, both from Japan, were announced to compete on August 13. Kobe Shinwa will make their debut after backing out of the 2022 edition.

On August 21, it was announced that Kurashiki, which would have made their third consecutive Invitational appearance, will no longer compete due to a "serious compliance violation" by head coach Hideo Suzuki. An invitation was first sent to the Farm Fresh Foxies, but the team instead gave the invitation to the Zus Coffee Thunderbelles, which accepted it.

Qualification method	Date	Berths	Qualifier(s)
2025 PVL on Tour semifinalists	August 7–9, 2025	4	Chery Tiggo Crossovers
2025 PVL on Tour semifinalists	August 7–9, 2025	4	Cignal HD Spikers
2025 PVL on Tour semifinalists	August 7–9, 2025	4	Creamline Cool Smashers
2025 PVL on Tour semifinalists	August 7–9, 2025	4	PLDT High Speed Hitters
Invited teams	August 21, 2025	1	Zus Coffee Thunderbelles
Foreign guest teams	August 13, 2025 (announcement)	~~2~~; 1	Kobe Shinwa University (Japan)
Foreign guest teams	August 13, 2025 (announcement)	~~2~~; 1	~~Kurashiki Ablaze (Japan)~~

== Participating teams ==
2025 Premier Volleyball League Invitational Conference
Abbr.	Team	Affiliation	Head coach	Team captain
Local teams
CTC	Chery Tiggo Crossovers	United Asia Automotive Group	(Philippines) Norman Miguel	(Philippines) Aby Maraño
CHD	Cignal HD Spikers	Cignal TV, Inc.	(Philippines) Shaq Delos Santos	(Philippines) Dawn Macandili-Catindig
CCS	Creamline Cool Smashers	Rebisco	(Philippines) Sherwin Meneses	(Philippines) Alyssa Valdez
HSH	PLDT High Speed Hitters	PLDT Inc.	(Philippines) Rald Ricafort	(Philippines) Kath Arado
ZUS	Zus Coffee Thunderbelles	Zuspresso Sdn. Bhd. / Strong Group Athletics	(Philippines) Jerry Yee	(Philippines) Cloanne Mondoñedo
Foreign guest team
KSU	Kobe Shinwa University		(Japan) Kiyokazu Yamamoto	(Japan) Sakura Furuta

== Venues ==
Preliminaries	Preliminaries, Finals
Pasig	Quezon City
PhilSports Arena (PSA)	Smart Araneta Coliseum (SAC)
Capacity: 10,000	Capacity: 20,000

== Transactions ==
=== National team players ===
The following players are part of the Philippines women's national team pool that were training and scheduled to play in several events in the 2025 national team season. They were therefore excluded from the conference. On August 18, these players were allowed to report back to their respective clubs but they can only play in the Reinforced Conference and not this tournament.

Additionally two players filed a leave of absence to train for the national beach volleyball team for the 2025 SEA Games.

Team	Player/s	
Chery Tiggo Crossovers	Jen Nierva	—N/a
Choco Mucho Flying Titans	Sisi Rondina (beach)	—N/a
Cignal HD Spikers	Dawn Catindig	Vanie Gandler
Creamline Cool Smashers	Jia de Guzman	Bernadeth Pons (beach)
PLDT High Speed Hitters	Dell Palomata	Alleiah Malaluan

== Format ==
The following format is being conducted for the entirety of the conference:

Preliminary round

- The preliminary round is a single round-robin tournament, with each team playing one match against all other teams for a total of five matches. Teams are ranked using the FIVB Ranking System.
  - Results from the 2025 PVL on Tour semifinals were carried over. Because of this, the four semifinalists will not play against their respective opponents from the conference and will only play four matches.
- The top two teams will advance to the championship match while teams ranked third and fourth will play in the third-place match.
- Teams ranked fifth and sixth will be eliminated and be ranked accordingly in the final standings.

Finals

- Both the championship (gold medal) and third-place (bronze medal) matches will be singular matches.
- The match-ups will be as follows:
  - Championship match: 1st ranked team vs. 2nd ranked team
  - Third-place match: 3rd ranked team vs. 4th ranked team

== Pool standing procedure ==
- First, teams are ranked by the number of matches won.
- If the number of matches won is tied, the tied teams are then ranked by match points, wherein:
  - Match won 3–0 or 3–1: 3 match points for the winner, 0 match points for the loser.
  - Match won 3–2: 2 match points for the winner, 1 match point for the loser.
- In case of any further ties, the following criteria shall be used:
  - Set ratio: the number of sets won divided by number of sets lost.
  - Point ratio: the number of points scored divided by the number of points allowed.
  - Head-to-head standings: any remaining tied teams are ranked based on the results of head-to-head matches involving the teams in question.

== Preliminary round ==
- All times are Philippine Standard Time (UTC+08:00).
- The results from the PVL On Tour Semifinals will be carried over.

=== Standings ===
Pos	Team	Pld	W	L	Pts	SW	SL	SR	SPW	SPL	SPR	Qualification
1	PLDT High Speed Hitters	5	5	0	14	15	3	5.000	434	344	1.262	Championship match
2	Kobe Shinwa University	5	4	1	11	12	7	1.714	442	402	1.100	Championship match
3	Chery Tiggo Crossovers	5	3	2	9	11	9	1.222	430	425	1.012	3rd place match
4	Creamline Cool Smashers	5	2	3	7	11	11	1.000	482	460	1.048	3rd place match
5	Cignal HD Spikers	5	1	4	4	7	13	0.538	398	433	0.919	
6	Zus Coffee Thunderbelles	5	0	5	0	2	15	0.133	303	423	0.716	

Source: Premier Volleyball League

=== Match results ===
Date	Time	Venue		Score		Set 1	Set 2	Set 3	Set 4	Set 5	Total	Report
Aug 21	16:00	PSA	Cignal HD Spikers	2–3	Creamline Cool Smashers	25–22	17–25	25–22	11–25	8–15	86–109	P2
Aug 21	18:30	PSA	PLDT High Speed Hitters	3–0	Chery Tiggo Crossovers	25–16	25–14	25–20			75–50	P2
Aug 23	13:30	PSA	Kobe Shinwa University	3–0	Zus Coffee Thunderbelles	25–14	27–25	25–17			77–56	P2
Aug 23	16:00	PSA	PLDT High Speed Hitters	3–0	Cignal HD Spikers	25–19	25–13	25–22			75–54	P2
Aug 23	18:30	PSA	Creamline Cool Smashers	2–3	Chery Tiggo Crossovers	20–25	26–24	25–21	17–25	15–17	103–112	P2
Aug 25	16:00	PSA	PLDT High Speed Hitters	3–0	Kobe Shinwa University	25–20	25–22	25–23			75–65	P2
Aug 25	18:30	PSA	Cignal HD Spikers	3–1	Zus Coffee Thunderbelles	22–25	25–19	25–18	25–19		97–81	P2
Aug 26	16:00	PSA	Kobe Shinwa University	3–1	Creamline Cool Smashers	27–25	25–23	23–25	25–21		100–94	P2
Aug 26	18:30	PSA	Zus Coffee Thunderbelles	0–3	Chery Tiggo Crossovers	17–25	17–25	23–25			57–75	P2
Aug 28	16:00	SAC	Cignal HD Spikers	1–3	Kobe Shinwa University	7–25	18–25	25–19	25–27		75–96	P2
Aug 28	18:30	SAC	PLDT High Speed Hitters	3–1	Zus Coffee Thunderbelles	24–26	25–17	25–17	25–14		99–74	P2
Aug 29	16:00	SAC	Kobe Shinwa University	3–2	Chery Tiggo Crossovers	21–25	17–25	26–24	25–22	15–6	104–102	P2
Aug 29	18:30	SAC	Zus Coffee Thunderbelles	0–3	Creamline Cool Smashers	15–25	18–25	21–25			54–75	P2

== Final round ==
- All times are Philippine Standard Time (UTC+08:00).

=== 3rd place match ===
Date	Time	Venue		Score		Set 1	Set 2	Set 3	Set 4	Set 5	Total	Report
Aug 31	16:00	SAC	Chery Tiggo Crossovers	0–3	Creamline Cool Smashers	15–25	13–25	22–25			50–75	P2

=== Championship match ===
Date	Time	Venue		Score		Set 1	Set 2	Set 3	Set 4	Set 5	Total	Report
Aug 31	18:30	SAC	PLDT High Speed Hitters	3–1	Kobe Shinwa University	21–25	31–29	25–22	25–18		102–94	P2

== Final standings ==
Rank	Team
1st place, gold medalist(s)	PLDT High Speed Hitters
2nd place, silver medalist(s)	Kobe Shinwa University
3rd place, bronze medalist(s)	Creamline Cool Smashers
4	Chery Tiggo Crossovers
5	Cignal HD Spikers
6	Zus Coffee Thunderbelles

2025 PVL Invitational champions
PLDT High Speed Hitters
Second title

Team roster
Kath Arado (c), Maria Nieza Viray, Shiela Mae Kiseo, Mika Reyes, Alleiah Jan Lina Malaluan, Savi Davison, Zenneth Irene Perolino, Kim Fajardo, Majoy Baron, Kim Kianna Dy, Dell Palomata, Anne Esguerra, Keisha Dazzie Bedonia, Angelica Legacion, Angelica Alcantara, Jessey Laine de Leon, Jovie Prado
Head coach
Rald Ricafort

== Awards and medalists ==
Award	Player	Team	Ref.
Conference Most Valuable Player	Savi Davison	PLDT	
Finals Most Valuable Player	Kath Arado	PLDT	
1st Best Outside Hitter	Jema Galanza	Creamline	
2nd Best Outside Hitter	Nagisa Komatsuda	Kobe Shinwa	
1st Best Middle Blocker	Jeanette Panaga	Creamline	
2nd Best Middle Blocker	Rizza Nogales	Zus Coffee	
Best Opposite Hitter	Ara Galang	Chery Tiggo	
Best Setter	Sakura Furuta	Kobe Shinwa	
Best Libero	Kath Arado	PLDT	

=== Medalists ===
Gold	Silver	Bronze
PLDT High Speed Hitters: Kath Arado (c) (L); Maria Nieza Viray (L); Shiela Mae Kiseo; Mika Reyes; Alleiah Jan Lina Malaluan; Savi Davison; Zenneth Irene Perolino; Kim Fajardo; Majoy Baron; Kim Kianna Dy; Dell Palomata; Keisha Dazzie Bedonia; Angelica Legacion; Angelica Alcantara; Jessey Laine de Leon; Jovie Prado; Mary Anne Esgguerra	Kobe Shinwa University: Sukura Furuta (c); Kana himoto; Rino Hirami (L); Arisu Ishikawa (L); Nagisa Komatsuda; Sakura Matsuo; Reira Miyazaki; Mei Morihara; Shion Muku; Saki Nishihori; Minami Oka; Mei Takahashi; Sara Yamada; Yuia Yamano; Miyu Yano; Kokoro Yasuma; Hana Yoshihara	Creamline Cool Smashers: Alyssa Valdez (c); Kyle Negrito; Michelle Gamit; Sheena Toring; Jeanette Panaga; Michele Gumabao; Ella de Jesus (L); Lorie Bernardo; Pau Soriano; Kyla Atienza (L); Denden Lazaro-Revilla (L); Bea de Leon; Nica Celis; Rizza Mandapat; Rosemarie Vargas; Tots Carlos; Mafe Galanza; Rhea Dimaculangan; Jema Galanza; Aleiah Torres (L)
Head coach: Rald Ricafort	Head coach: Kiyokazu Yamamoto	Head coach: Sherwin Meneses
