= 2024 Premier Volleyball League Invitational Conference =

Third conference of the 2024 PVL season

- Duration: September 4–12, 2024
- Teams: 5
- Matches: 12
- Attendance: 15,692 (1,308 per match)
- TV partner(s): One Sports; One Sports+ Pilipinas Live; RPTV

Results
- Champions: Creamline Cool Smashers
- Runners-up: Cignal HD Spikers
- Third place: Kurashiki Ablaze
- Fourth place: Est Cola

Awards
- Conference MVP: Michele Gumabao
- Finals MVP: Kyle Negrito
- Best OH: María José Pérez; Erica May Staunton
- Best MB: Jacqueline Acuña; Low Mei Cing
- Best OPP: Saya Taniguchi
- Best Setter: Kyle Negrito
- Best Libero: Kalyarat Khamwong

PVL Invitational Conference chronology
- < 2023 2025 >

PVL conference chronology
- < 2024 Reinforced 2024–25 All-Filipino >

The 2024 Premier Volleyball League Invitational Conference was the third conference of the 2024–25 Premier Volleyball League season. Unlike the previous iterations of the league, this conference was a short pocket tournament, lasting about nine days, making it the shortest conference in the league. The conference started on September 4, 2024, coinciding with the finals of the 2024 Premier Volleyball League Reinforced Conference.

Originally, the semifinalists of the 2024 Premier Volleyball League Reinforced Conference are qualified and will be able to play alongside two foreign guest teams — the reigning Invitational champions, Kurashiki Ablaze of Japan, and the newcomers, Est Cola of Thailand. But due to players' injuries, the PLDT High Speed Hitters and the Akari Chargers begged off from participation. The Farm Fresh Foxies will be the sole replacement as the other PVL teams declined to join.

== Qualification ==
The Invitational Conference is a pocket tournament and only the top four among the twelve Premier Volleyball League teams in the previous tournament (the 2024 Reinforced Conference) are qualified to participate along with two foreign-based guest teams.

The PLDT High Speed Hitters qualified as semifinalists but withdrew due to injuries from the past conference. It will be the eight placers Farm Fresh Foxies replaced PLDT after the next three ranked teams Chery Tiggo, Petro Gazz and Capital1 declined the PVL's invite. Akari Chargers also pulled out from the conference citing the same reason with PLDT. Akari were not replaced, making the participants down to five teams. This will be the conference with the least number of teams joining.

Two guest teams are Kurashiki Ablaze, the defending Invitational champions, and newcomer Est Cola will join the three local club teams to compete in this conference.

| Qualification method | Date | Berths | Qualifier(s) |
|---|---|---|---|
| 2024 PVL Reinforced Conference semifinalists | August 24 and 27, 2024 (Quarterfinals) | ~~4~~; 2 | Creamline Cool Smashers |
| 2024 PVL Reinforced Conference semifinalists | August 24 and 27, 2024 (Quarterfinals) | ~~4~~; 2 | ~~Akari Chargers~~ (withdrew) |
| 2024 PVL Reinforced Conference semifinalists | August 24 and 27, 2024 (Quarterfinals) | ~~4~~; 2 | Cignal HD Spikers |
| 2024 PVL Reinforced Conference semifinalists | August 24 and 27, 2024 (Quarterfinals) | ~~4~~; 2 | ~~PLDT High Speed Hitters~~ (withdrew) |
| Invited PVL teams | September 2, 2024 (announced) | ~~0~~; 1 | ~~Chery Tiggo Crossovers~~ (declined); ~~Petro Gazz Angels~~ (declined); ~~Capital1 Solar Spikers~~ (declined); Farm Fresh Foxies |
| Foreign guest teams | August 30–31, 2024 (announced) | 2 | Est Cola (Thailand) |
| Foreign guest teams | August 30–31, 2024 (announced) | 2 | Kurashiki Ablaze (Japan) |

== Participating teams ==
2024 Premier Volleyball League Invitational Conference
| Abbr. | Team | Affiliation | Head coach | Team captain |
Local teams
| CHD | Cignal HD Spikers | Cignal TV, Inc. | (Philippines) Shaq Delos Santos | (Philippines) Frances Molina |
| CCS | Creamline Cool Smashers | Republic Biscuit Corporation | (Philippines) Sherwin Meneses | (Philippines) Michele Gumabao (interim) |
| FFF | Farm Fresh Foxies | Farm Fresh Philippine International / Strong Group Athletics | (Japan) Shota Sato | (Philippines) Louie Romero |
Foreign guest teams
| EST | Est Cola | Sermsuk Public Co. Ltd. / Thailand U20 | (Thailand) Wanna Buakaew | (Thailand) Kanokporn Sangthong |
| KUR | Kurashiki Ablaze | Ablaze Co., Ltd. / V.League (Japan) | (Japan) Hideo Suzuki | (Japan) Saya Taniguchi |

== Venues ==
Regular venues

| Preliminaries | | Finals |
| Pasay | Pasig | Quezon City |
|---|---|---|
| SM Mall of Asia Arena | PhilSports Arena | Araneta Coliseum |
| Capacity: 20,000 | Capacity: 10,000 | Capacity: 20,000 |

PVL on Tour venues

Preliminaries
Santa Rosa
Santa Rosa Sports Complex
Capacity: 5,700
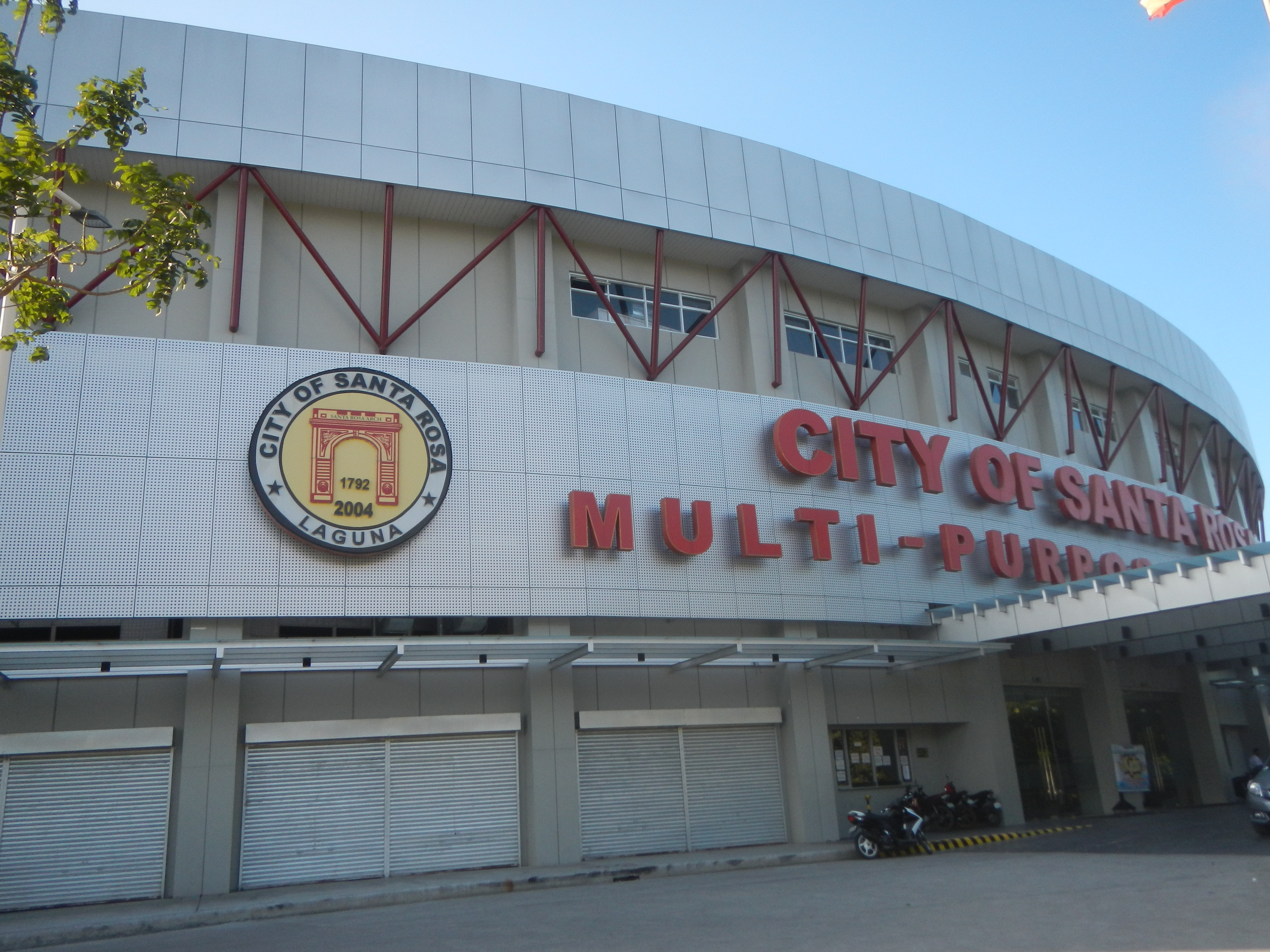

== Transactions ==
=== National team players ===
The following players are part of the Philippine national team that played at the 2024 AVC Women's Challenge Cup, 2024 FIVB Women's Volleyball Challenger Cup and the 2024 SEA Women's V.League. They are therefore excluded from the previous Reinforced Conference, and were expected to remain unavailable for the whole duration of the Invitational Conference. However on September 9 they were allowed to rejoin their clubs, after the national team played friendly matches with Saga Hisamitsu Springs on September 7 and 8.

| Team | Player/s | |
|---|---|---|
| Cignal HD Spikers | Vanie Gandler | Dawn Macandili-Catindig |
| Creamline Cool Smashers | Jema Galanza | —N/a |

=== Foreign guest players ===
These foreign guest players participated in the reinforced conference. Each team is only allowed to have one foreign player and can only replace them mid-conference if they suffer from injuries or if the player (not the team) abandons their commitment. The teams also have the option to keep or replace their reinforcements to play in this conference.

| Team | Foreign player | Moving from | Ref. |
|---|---|---|---|
| Cignal HD Spikers | (Venezuela) María José Pérez | (Egypt) Alexandria Sporting Club | |
| Creamline Cool Smashers | (United States) Erica Staunton | (United States) Georgia Bulldogs | |
| Farm Fresh Foxies | (Japan) Asaka Tamaru | (Philippines) Zus Coffee Thunderbelles | |

== Format ==
The following format will be conducted for the entirety of the conference:

Preliminary Round

1. Single round-robin format
2. Teams are ranked using the FIVB Ranking System.
3. The 3rd and 4th ranked teams will advance to the bronze medal match.
4. The 1st and 2nd ranked teams will advance to the gold medal match.

Finals

1. All games are knockout matches.
2. Bronze medal: 3rd ranked team vs. 4th ranked team
3. Gold medal: 1st ranked team vs. 2nd ranked team

== Pool standing procedure ==
- First, teams are ranked by the number of matches won.
- If the number of matches won is tied, the tied teams are then ranked by match points, wherein:
  - Match won 3–0 or 3–1: 3 match points for the winner, 0 match points for the loser.
  - Match won 3–2: 2 match points for the winner, 1 match point for the loser.
- In case of any further ties, the following criteria shall be used:
  - Set ratio: the number of sets won divided by number of sets lost.
  - Point ratio: the number of points scored divided by the number of points allowed.
  - Head-to-head standings: any remaining tied teams are ranked based on the results of head-to-head matches involving the teams in question.

== Preliminary round ==
- All times are Philippine Standard Time (UTC+08:00).

=== Ranking ===
| Pos | Team | Pld | W | L | Pts | SW | SL | SR | SPW | SPL | SPR | Qualification |
|---|---|---|---|---|---|---|---|---|---|---|---|---|
| 1 | Creamline Cool Smashers | 4 | 4 | 0 | 12 | 12 | 2 | 6.000 | 347 | 270 | 1.285 | Championship match |
| 2 | Cignal HD Spikers | 4 | 3 | 1 | 8 | 10 | 5 | 2.000 | 348 | 307 | 1.134 | Championship match |
| 3 | Kurashiki Ablaze | 4 | 2 | 2 | 7 | 9 | 7 | 1.286 | 373 | 364 | 1.025 | 3rd place match |
| 4 | Est Cola | 4 | 1 | 3 | 2 | 4 | 11 | 0.364 | 292 | 352 | 0.830 | 3rd place match |
| 5 | Farm Fresh Foxies | 4 | 0 | 4 | 1 | 2 | 12 | 0.167 | 238 | 333 | 0.715 | |

Source: Premier Volleyball League

=== Match results ===
| Date | Time | Venue | | Score | | Set 1 | Set 2 | Set 3 | Set 4 | Set 5 | Total | Report |
|---|---|---|---|---|---|---|---|---|---|---|---|---|
| Sep 4 | 13:00 | PSA | Est Cola | 1–3 | Kurashiki Ablaze | 20–25 | 18–25 | 25–23 | 21–25 | | 84–98 | P2 |
| Sep 5 | 16:00 | PSA | Kurashiki Ablaze | 3–0 | Farm Fresh Foxies | 25–13 | 25–16 | 25–16 | | | 75–45 | P2 |
| Sep 6 | 14:00 | SRSC | Est Cola | 0–3 | Creamline Cool Smashers | 13–25 | 12–25 | 15–25 | | | 40–75 | P2 |
| Sep 6 | 16:00 | SRSC | Cignal HD Spikers | 3–0 | Farm Fresh Foxies | 25–16 | 25–10 | 25–18 | | | 75–44 | P2 |
| Sep 8 | 16:00 | MOA | Cignal HD Spikers | 3–0 | Est Cola | 25–23 | 27–25 | 25–12 | | | 77–60 | P2 |
| Sep 8 | 18:00 | MOA | Creamline Cool Smashers | 3–1 | Kurashiki Ablaze | 25–22 | 25–22 | 26–28 | 25–21 | | 101–93 | P2 |
| Sep 9 | 16:00 | MOA | Farm Fresh Foxies | 2–3 | Est Cola | 25–22 | 17–25 | 25–19 | 20–25 | 15–17 | 102–108 | P2 |
| Sep 9 | 18:00 | MOA | Creamline Cool Smashers | 3–1 | Cignal HD Spikers | 25–18 | 29–27 | 17–25 | 25–20 | | 96–90 | P2 |
| Sep 11 | 16:00 | PSA | Farm Fresh Foxies | 0–3 | Creamline Cool Smashers | 15–25 | 13–25 | 19–25 | | | 47–75 | P2 |
| Sep 11 | 18:00 | PSA | Cignal HD Spikers | 3–2 | Kurashiki Ablaze | 25–23 | 19–25 | 25–23 | 22–25 | 15–11 | 106–107 | P2 |

== Final round ==
- All times are Philippine Standard Time (UTC+08:00).

=== 3rd place match ===
| Date | Time | Venue | | Score | | Set 1 | Set 2 | Set 3 | Set 4 | Set 5 | Total | Report |
|---|---|---|---|---|---|---|---|---|---|---|---|---|
| Sep 12 | 16:00 | SAC | Est Cola | 0–3 | Kurashiki Ablaze | 22–25 | 24–26 | 20–25 | | | 66–76 | P2 |

=== Championship match ===
| Date | Time | Venue | | Score | | Set 1 | Set 2 | Set 3 | Set 4 | Set 5 | Total | Report |
|---|---|---|---|---|---|---|---|---|---|---|---|---|
| Sep 12 | 18:00 | SAC | Cignal HD Spikers | 2–3 | Creamline Cool Smashers | 25–21 | 17–25 | 25–20 | 24–26 | 13–15 | 104–107 | P2 |

== Final standing ==
| Rank | Team |
|---|---|
| 1st place, gold medalist(s) | Creamline Cool Smashers |
| 2nd place, silver medalist(s) | Cignal HD Spikers |
| 3rd place, bronze medalist(s) | Kurashiki Ablaze |
| 4 | Est Cola |
| 5 | Farm Fresh Foxies |

2024 PVL Invitational champions
Creamline Cool Smashers
Tenth title

Team roster
Alyssa Valdez (c), Kyle Negrito, Floremel Rodriguez, Risa Sato, Jeanette Panaga, Michele Gumabao, Ella de Jesus, Lorie Bernardo, Pau Soriano, Kyla Atienza, Denden Lazaro-Revilla, Bea de Leon, Theo Bea Bonafe, Rizza Mandapat, Rosemarie Vargas, Jema Galanza, Bernadeth Pons, Mafe Galanza, Tots Carlos, Erica Staunton, Aleiah Torres
Head coach
Sherwin Meneses

== Awards and medalists ==
=== Awards ===
| Award | Player | Team | Ref. |
|---|---|---|---|
| Conference Most Valuable Player | (Philippines) Michele Gumabao | Creamline | |
| Finals Most Valuable Player | (Philippines) Kyle Negrito | Creamline | |
| 1st Best Outside Spiker | (Venezuela) María José Pérez | Cignal | |
| 2nd Best Outside Spiker | (United States) Erica Staunton | Creamline | |
| 1st Best Middle Blocker | (Philippines) Jacqueline Acuña | Cignal | |
| 2nd Best Middle Blocker | (Malaysia) Low Mei Cing | Kurashiki | |
| Best Opposite Spiker | (Japan) Saya Taniguchi | Kurashiki | |
| Best Setter | (Philippines) Kyle Negrito | Creamline | |
| Best Libero | (Thailand) Kalyarat Khamwong | Est Cola | |

=== Medalists ===
| Gold | Silver | Bronze |
| Creamline Cool Smashers: Alyssa Valdez (c); Kyle Negrito; Floremel Rodriguez; Risa Sato; Jeanette Panaga; Michele Gumabao; Ella de Jesus; Lorie Bernardo; Pau Soriano; Kyla Atienza (L); Denden Lazaro-Revilla (L); Bea De Leon; Theo Bea Bonafe; Rizza Mandapat; Rosemarie Vargas; Jema Galanza; Bernadeth Pons; Maria Fe Galanza; Tots Carlos; Erica Staunton (I); Aleiah Torres | Cignal HD Spikers: Frances Molina (c); Glaudine Troncoso; Roselyn Doria; Angelique Dionela (L); Geneveve Casugod; Vanie Gandler; Rochelle Lalongisip; Jovelyn Fernandez; Judith Abil (L); Toni Basas; Jacqueline Acuña; Gyzelle Sy; Angelei Jingco; María José Pérez (I); Ria Meneses; Dawn Macandili-Catindig (L); Gel Cayuna | Kurashiki Ablaze: Saya Taniguchi (c); Wako Omura; Hiroko Morimoto; Kyoka Ohshima; Kaoru Takahashi (L); Akane Hiraoka; Yukino Yano; Miho Kawamura; Reina Fujiwara; Low Mei Cing (I); Saki Tanabe; Takio Kokoro; Nana Fujimura (L); Tsuji Ayano; Mami Gondo |
| Head coach: Sherwin Meneses | Head coach: Shaq Delos Santos | Head coach: Hideo Suzuki |

== See also ==
- 2024 Spikers' Turf Invitational Conference
