= Creamline Cool Smashers =

Filipino professional women's volleyball team

- 2026–27 Creamline Cool Smashers season
- Short name: Creamline
- Nickname: Cool Smashers
- Founded: 2017
- History: Creamline Cool Smashers; 2017–present
- Head coach: Sherwin Meneses
- Captain: Alyssa Valdez
- League: Premier Volleyball League
- 2026 Invitational: 4th place
- Championships: 11 List: 2018 Reinforced 2018 Open 2019 Open 2022 Open 2022 Invitational 2023 First All-Filipino 2023 Second All-Filipino 2024 All-Filipino 2024 Reinforced 2024 Invitational 2026 All-Filipino

Uniforms
Home	Away

The Creamline Cool Smashers are a Filipino professional women's volleyball team owned by Rebisco. The team competes in the Premier Volleyball League (PVL), where they were one of the six original women's teams in 2017. The team is named after Creamline Creamy Ice Cream, one of Rebisco's products.

The Cool Smashers saw instant success under head coach Tai Bundit, which later continued into the professional era under Sherwin Meneses. The team has won eleven PVL championships, more than any other team in the league, and are the only franchise to have accomplished the rare Grand Slam by winning all three conferences in the 2024 season. From 2017 to 2025, the team also had a podium streak that lasted for nineteen conferences.

Many star players have competed for the team, including Alyssa Valdez, Jia de Guzman, Jema Galanza, Jeanette Panaga, and Michele Gumabao among others. The Cool Smashers also have a sister team in the Choco Mucho Flying Titans. The two teams contest the Rebisco Clasico, the league's most popular active rivalry. They also had a rivalry with the now-inactive Petro Gazz Angels, with both teams being the league's two most successful teams.

== History ==
=== 2017–2021: Tai Bundit era, early success ===
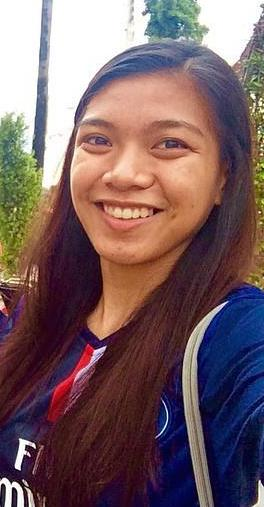
Alyssa Valdez has played for Creamline since the team's establishment in 2017.

The Creamline Cool Smashers were one of two expansion teams during the Shakey's V-League's rebrand to the current Premier Volleyball League, alongside the Perlas Spikers. The team is owned by Rebisco, which named the team after their ice cream brand Creamline. For their inaugural season, the team appointed Tai Bundit as head coach and signed three-time UAAP women's volleyball MVP Alyssa Valdez as team captain.

Right away, Creamline made the semifinals of the 2017 Reinforced Conference but lost to the BaliPure Purest Water Defenders. In the Open Conference, the team added Jia Morado to their roster, but still fell to BaliPure in the semifinals. The 2018 Reinforced Conference saw the arrival of Filipina-Japanese player Risa Sato. After topping the preliminary round table, the Cool Smashers beat the Pocari Sweat–Air Force Lady Warriors in the semifinals to make their first finals appearance. They would then sweep the PayMaya High Flyers to win their first championship. They would follow up with a second championship in the 2018 Open Conference, sweeping the Ateneo–Motolite Lady Eagles in the conference finals.

In the 2019 Reinforced Conference, the team had an opportunity to win three championships in a row. In the finals, they would face against the Petro Gazz Angels in the first title bout of their eventual rivalry. The Cool Smashers fell short in the Reinforced Conference finals, losing to the Angels in three matches, but reclaimed their throne in a rematch during the Open Conference finals, beating Petro Gazz in two matches.

After the PVL's year-long suspension due to the COVID-19 pandemic, Creamline returned to competitive play in 2021, this time as a professional team. For the 2021 Open Conference, the team added Tots Carlos from the Motolite Power Builders. After beating Petro Gazz in the semifinals, the team made their fifth consecutive finals, where standing in their way were PVL newcomers Chery Tiggo Crossovers. Creamline failed to go back-to-back a second time after a close best-of-three series.

=== 2022–present: Sherwin Meneses era ===
Ahead of the 2022 season, Creamline made their first major coaching shift. Due to the pandemic, Bundit had to stay in his home country of Thailand. In his place, Sherwin Meneses, who was the team's interim head coach last season, took on the permanent role going forward.

==== 2022–2023: Continued success ====
The team's success continued under Meneses. Keeping their existing roster with minimal changes, the team won back-to-back titles in the Open Conference and Invitational Conference. During the season, Creamline also formed part of the Philippine national team's core and staff for the 2022 Asian Women's Volleyball Cup on account of winning the Invitational Conference. Creamline, acting as the national team, finished sixth in the tournament hosted at home. Heading into the 2022 Reinforced Conference, Creamline had a shot at achieving the league's first Grand Slam, the feat of winning all three conferences in a single season. Unfortunately, they finished third in the round-robin semifinals, not only losing their chance but also ending their streak of seven finals appearances. They did sweep the Chery Tiggo Crossovers in the third place series to extended their podium streak to ten conferences.

The team opened the 2023 season with yet another championship, beating Petro Gazz in the 2023 All-Filipino Conference finals, but fell short in the following Invitational Conference against Japanese guest team Kurashiki Ablaze. Ahead of the culminating conference of the season, Creamline lost Jia de Guzman, who had moved to Japan to play for the Denso Airybees. Still, in the 2023 Second All-Filipino Conference, Creamline managed to make their tenth finals appearance in eleven conferences, where they would play against their sister team, the Choco Mucho Flying Titans, for the first time. Creamline would defeat Choco Mucho in two matches to win their seventh championship.

==== 2024: Grand Slam season ====
Despite not being able to top the preliminary rounds of the first two conferences of the season, Creamline were able to win the title in both the 2024 All-Filipino Conference and Reinforced Conference. Once again, the Cool Smashers had a shot at the Grand Slam in the Invitational Conference, albeit with a smaller pool of teams. After going undefeated in the preliminary round, they faced against the Cignal HD Spikers for a shot at history. In a close five-set match, Creamline were able to defeat Cignal to claim the league's first-ever Grand Slam.

==== 2025: Grand Slam blues ====
In April 2025, Creamline competed at the 2025 AVC Women's Volleyball Champions League in Pasig. The team lost in the elimination round. In August, Creamline finished third in the 2025 Premier Volleyball League Invitational Conference after defeating Chery Tiggo. In November, Creamline sustained its worst-standing in the PVL after it lost to Petro Gazz in the quarterfinals of the 2025 Premier Volleyball League Reinforced Conference.

==== 2026–present: Return to form ====
In 2026, Creamline gained its 11th title when it won the 2026 Premier Volleyball League All-Filipino Conference after defeating the Cignal Super Spikers 3–2 in a best-of-three game series.

== Current roster ==
Creamline Cool Smashers roster
No.	Nat.	Player	Pos.	Height	DOB	From
1	(Philippines)	Kyle Negrito	Setter	1.72 m (5 ft 8 in)	December 15, 1996 (age 29)	Far Eastern
2	(Philippines)	Alyssa Valdez (C)	Outside Hitter	1.74 m (5 ft 9 in)	June 29, 1993 (age 33)	Ateneo
3	(Philippines)	Michelle Gamit	Middle Blocker	1.73 m (5 ft 8 in)	May 9, 2000 (age 26)	St. Benilde
5	(Philippines)	Sheena Toring	Middle Blocker	1.78 m (5 ft 10 in)	May 28, 2001 (age 25)	National-U
6	(Philippines)	Jeanette Panaga	Middle Blocker	1.78 m (5 ft 10 in)	July 25, 1994 (age 32)	St. Benilde
7	(Philippines)	Michele Gumabao	Opposite Hitter	1.75 m (5 ft 9 in)	September 2, 1992 (age 34)	De La Salle
8	(Philippines)	Ella de Jesus	Libero / Outside Hitter	1.57 m (5 ft 2 in)	August 17, 1993 (age 33)	Ateneo
9	(Philippines)	Lorie Bernardo	Opposite Hitter	1.82 m (6 ft 0 in)	August 1, 2000 (age 26)	Philippines
10	(Philippines)	Donnalyn Paralejas	Setter	1.59 m (5 ft 3 in)	May 10, 2000 (age 26)	Arellano
11	(Philippines)	Kyla Atienza	Libero	1.67 m (5 ft 6 in)	April 12, 1997 (age 29)	Far Eastern
12	(Philippines)	Jia De Guzman	Setter	1.77 m (5 ft 10 in)	May 15, 1995 (age 31)	Ateneo
13	(Philippines)	Denden Lazaro-Revilla	Libero	1.65 m (5 ft 5 in)	January 21, 1992 (age 34)	Ateneo
14	(Philippines)	Bea de Leon	Middle Blocker	1.80 m (5 ft 11 in)	August 2, 1996 (age 30)	Ateneo
15	(Philippines)	Nica Celis	Middle Blocker	1.78 m (5 ft 10 in)	July 7, 2001 (age 25)	Philippines
16	(Philippines)	Erin Pangilinan	Middle Blocker	1.70 m (5 ft 7 in)	October 12, 2001 (age 25)	National-U
17	(Philippines)	Rosemarie Vargas	Outside Hitter	1.70 m (5 ft 7 in)	December 12, 1992 (age 33)	Far Eastern
18	(Philippines)	Tots Carlos	Opposite Hitter	1.74 m (5 ft 9 in)	July 7, 1998 (age 28)	Philippines
20	(Philippines)	Barbie Jamili	Outside Hitter	1.65 m (5 ft 5 in)	March 15, 2003 (age 23)	Adamson
21	(Philippines)	Ishie Lalongisip	Outside Hitter	1.68 m (5 ft 6 in)	December 30, 2001 (age 24)	Adamson
22	(Philippines)	Jennifer Nierva	Libero	1.66 m (5 ft 5 in)	November 8, 1999 (age 26)	National-U
23	(Philippines)	Jema Galanza	Outside Hitter	1.70 m (5 ft 7 in)	November 28, 1996 (age 29)	Adamson
24	(Philippines) (Canada)	Aleiah Torres	Libero / Outside Hitter	1.63 m (5 ft 4 in)	September 24, 2001 (age 25)	Brock
Updated as of: October 8, 2026 | Source: PVL.ph

Coaching staff

- Head coach:
  Sherwin Meneses
- Assistant coach:
  Karlo Martin Santos
  Ariel Morado Jr.
  Carl Bryan Vitug
  Lawrence Magadia
- Team statistician:
  Mark Alfafara

Team staff

- Team manager:
  Alan Acero
- Team coordinator:
  Maria Carlota Celda
- Trainer:
  Mark Christopher Caron
- Utility:
  Sonny Cruz
  Eduardo Martinez

Medical staff

- Physiotherapist:
  Jonathan Garduque
- Physical therapist:
  Haree Jan Rañeses

== Rivalries ==
=== Choco Mucho Flying Titans ===
Creamline has a rivalry with sister team Choco Mucho Flying Titans, despite mostly dominating the rivalry. It has become one of the PVL's most popular rivalries, with matches between the two seeing large attendance turnouts. The two teams met in the championship twice.

=== Petro Gazz Angels ===
Until 2025, the Creamline Cool Smashers and Petro Gazz Angels were the two longest-tenured and most successful teams in the PVL. Before Petro Gazz took a leave of absence in 2026, both teams met in the championship five teams with Creamline winning three of them.

== Season-by-season records ==
=== Premier Volleyball League ===
List of the last five conferences completed by the Creamline Cool Smashers. For the full-season history, see List of Creamline Cool Smashers seasons.

Season	Conference	Preliminary round	Final round	Ranking	Source
2024–25 (team)	All-Filipino	1st (10–1, 29 pts)	Won in quarterfinals vs. Chery Tiggo, 2–0; Finished 2nd in semifinals (2–1, 6 pts); Lost in championship vs. Petro Gazz, 1–2	Runner-up	
2025–26 (team)	PVL on Tour	2nd (3–2, 10 pts) (Pool B)	Won in quarterfinals vs. Farm Fresh, 3–0; Lost in semifinals vs. PLDT, 2–3 Won in third place match vs. Cignal, 3–0	3rd place	
2025–26 (team)	Invitational	4th (2–3, 5 pts)	Won in third place match vs. Chery Tiggo, 3–0	3rd place	
2025–26 (team)	Reinforced	4th (5–3, 17 pts)	Lost in quarterfinals vs. Petro Gazz, 1–3	6th place	
2025–26 (team)	All-Filipino	3rd (6–3, 16 pts)	Lost in qualifying vs. Cignal, 2–3; Won in Play-in final (Pool B) vs. Akari, 3–1; Finished 2nd in semifinals (2–1, 5 pts) Won in championship vs. Cignal, 2–0	Champions	
2026–27 (team)	Invitational	3rd (3–2, 9 pts)	Lost in third place match vs. PLDT, 1–3	4th place	

=== AVC Women's Volleyball Champions League ===
Year	Preliminary round	Final round	Ranking	Source
2025	2nd (1–1, 3 pts) (Pool A)	Lost in quarterfinals vs. Nakhon Ratchasima	8th place	

== Individual awards ==
=== PVL awardees ===
Most Valuable Player

Year	Conference	Player	Ref.
2017	Reinforced	Alyssa Valdez	
2018	Open	Alyssa Valdez	
2019	Reinforced	Alyssa Valdez	
2019	Open	Jema Galanza	
2022	Open	Tots Carlos	
2022	Invitational	Tots Carlos	
2023	1st All-Filipino	Tots Carlos	
2024	Reinforced	Bernadeth Pons	
2024	Invitational	Michele Gumabao	

Finals Most Valuable Player

Year	Conference	Player	Ref.
2018	Reinforced	Jia de Guzman	
2018	Open	Jia de Guzman	
2019	Open	Jia de Guzman	
2022	Open	Alyssa Valdez	
2022	Invitational	Ced Domingo	
2023	1st All-Filipino	Jia de Guzman	
2023	2nd All-Filipino	Tots Carlos	
2024	All-Filipino	Jema Galanza	
2024	Reinforced	Bernadeth Pons	
2024	Invitational	Kyle Negrito	
2026	All-Filipino	Bernadeth Pons	

1st Best Outside Hitter

Year	Conference	Player
2017	Reinforced	Alyssa Valdez
2018	Reinforced	Alyssa Valdez
2018	Open	Alyssa Valdez
2019	Open	Jema Galanza
2021	Open	Alyssa Valdez
2022	Invitational	Alyssa Valdez
2022	Reinforced	Alyssa Valdez
2023	1st All-Filipino	Tots Carlos
2024–25	PVL on Tour	Alyssa Valdez
2024–25	Invitational	Jema Galanza

2nd Best Outside Hitter

Year	Conference	Player
2018	Open	Jema Galanza
2019	Reinforced	Alyssa Valdez
2023	1st All-Filipino	Jema Galanza
2023	Invitational	Alyssa Valdez
2023	2nd All-Filipino	Jema Galanza
2024	All-Filipino	Jema Galanza
2024	Invitational	Erica Staunton
2024–25	All-Filipino	Bernadeth Pons

1st Best Middle Blocker

Year	Conference	Player
2023	2nd All-Filipino	Jeanette Panaga
2024–25	PVL on Tour	Jeanette Panaga
2024–25	Invitational	Jeanette Panaga
2026	All-Filipino	Jeanette Panaga
2026–27	Invitational	Jaja Santiago-Minowa

2nd Best Middle Blocker

Year	Conference	Player
2023	Invitational	Ced Domingo
2024	All-Filipino	Jeanette Panaga
2024–25	All-Filipino	Bea de Leon
2024–25	Reinforced	Jeanette Panaga

Best Opposite Hitter

Year	Conference	Player
2018	Reinforced	Michele Gumabao
2022	Open	Tots Carlos
2022	Invitational	Tots Carlos
2023	1st All-Filipino	Michele Gumabao
2023	Invitational	Tots Carlos
2023	2nd All-Filipino	Michele Gumabao

Best Setter

Year	Conference	Player
2017	Open	Jia de Guzman
2018	Reinforced	Jia de Guzman
2018	Open	Jia de Guzman
2019	Reinforced	Jia de Guzman
2019	Open	Jia de Guzman
2021	Open	Jia de Guzman
2022	Reinforced	Jia de Guzman
2023	1st All-Filipino	Jia de Guzman
2024	All-Filipino	Kyle Negrito
2024	Invitational	Kyle Negrito
2024–25	All-Filipino	Kyle Negrito
2024–25	PVL on Tour	Kyle Negrito

Best Libero

Year	Conference	Player
2019	Open	Kyla Atienza

PVL Press Corps awardees

Year	Award	Player	Ref.
2025	Best Outside Hitter	Bernadeth Pons	
2025	Best Middle Blocker	Bea de Leon	

== Imports ==
Season	Number	Player	Country
2017	11	Laura Schaudt	(United States) USA
2017	16	Kuttika Kaewpin	Thailand
2018	1	Nikolina Aščerić (withdrew)	Serbia
2018	18	Kuttika Kaewpin	Thailand
2018	21	Laura Schaudt	(United States) USA
2019	16	Kuttika Kaewpin	Thailand
2019	18	Aleoscar Blanco	Venezuela
2022	21	Yeliz Başa	Turkey
2024	22	Erica Staunton	(United States) USA
2025 AVC CL	22	Erica Staunton	(United States) USA
2025 AVC CL	5	Anastassiya Kolomoyets	Kazakhstan
2025 AVC CL	3	Anastasya Kudryashova	Russia
2025	22	Courtney Schwan	(United States) USA

== Team captains ==
- (Philippines) Alyssa Valdez (2017 – present)
- (Philippines) Jia de Guzman (2026) – Interim captain
- (Philippines) Michele Gumabao (2024) – Interim captain

== Coaches ==
- (Thailand) Tai Bundit (2017–18; 2019–2021)
- (China) Li Huanning (2019, withdrew)
- (Philippines) Sherwin Meneses (2022–present)

== Former players ==
Local players

- Aerieal Patnongon
- Alexine Danielle Cabanos
- Anngela Nunag
- Celine Domingo (2019-2023)
- Cesca Racraquin
- Coleen Laurice Bravo
- Fille Cainglet-Cayetano (2018-2023)
- Heather Guino-o
- Ivy Elaine Remulla
- Jamela Suyat
- Janet Serafica
- Jem Nicole Gutierrez
- Jonalyn Ibisa
- Joyce Antonniette Palad
- Mafe Galanza
- Mary Jean Balse
- Melissa Gohing
- Michelle Morente (2025)
- Pau Soriano (2017-2025)
- Paula Maninang
- Rhea Dimaculangan (2025)
- Risa Sato (2018-2024)
- Rizza Mandapat (2017-2025)
- Theo Bea Bonafe

Foreign players

Kazakhstan

- Anastassiya Kolomoyets - AVC Women’s Champions League 2025

Russia

- Anastasiya Kudryashova - AVC Women’s Champions League 2025

Serbia

- Nikolina Aščerić

Thailand

- Kuttika Kaewpin

Turkey

- Yeliz Başa

United States

- Laura Schaudt
- Erica Staunton
- Courtney Schwan

Venezuela

- Aleoscar Blanco

== Draft history ==
Season	Pick No.	Name
2024	12	Aleiah Torres
2025	12	Sheena Toring
2025	23	Maria Dannica Celis
2026	8	Barbie Jamili
