= 2022 Premier Volleyball League Invitational Conference =

Second conference of the 2022 PVL season

- Duration: July 9 – August 14, 2022
- Teams: 8
- Matches: 33
- Attendance: 92,271 (2,796 per match)
- TV partner(s): One Sports; One Sports+

Results
- Champions: Creamline Cool Smashers
- Runners-up: KingWhale Taipei
- Third place: Cignal HD Spikers
- Fourth place: PLDT High Speed Hitters

Awards
- Conference MVP: Tots Carlos
- Finals MVP: Celine Domingo
- Best OH: Alyssa Valdez; Frances Molina
- Best MB: Mika Reyes; Dell Palomata
- Best OPP: Tots Carlos
- Best Setter: Liao Yi-Jen
- Best Libero: Qiu Shi-Qing

PVL Invitational Conference chronology
- < 2011 (SVL) 2023 >

PVL conference chronology
- < 2022 Open 2022 Reinforced >

The 2022 Premier Volleyball League Invitational Conference was the twelfth conference of the Premier Volleyball League, its third conference as a professional league, and the second conference of the 2022 season.

The tournament began on July 9, 2022. Originally slated for the July 2, the tournament was pushed back due to the requests of the club teams.

This is the first (the second for the former SVL) conference of the league to commence an invitational conference. A total of eight teams will compete in this event, including one international team — KingWhale Taipei from Taiwan. The BaliPure Purest Water Defenders and F2 Logistics begged off from joining the conference. A second guest team, Kobe Shinwa University, was supposed to join the semi-final round but backed out at the last minute. Replacement guest Philippine National Team, composed mostly of NU Lady Bulldogs team members, also backed out.

== Participating teams ==
2022 Premier Volleyball League Invitational Conference
Abbr.	Team	Affiliation	Head coach	Team captain
Local teams
ABM	Army Black Mamba Lady Troopers	Philippine Army / Corbridge Group	(Philippines) Kungfu Reyes	(Philippines) Jovelyn Gonzaga
CTC	Chery Tiggo 7 Pro Crossovers	United Asia Automotive Group, Inc.	(Philippines) Clarence Esteban	(Philippines) Maika Ortiz
CMF	Choco Mucho Flying Titans	Republic Biscuit Corporation	(Philippines) Oliver Almadro	(Philippines) Bea de Leon
CHD	Cignal HD Spikers	Cignal TV, Inc.	(Philippines) Shaq Delos Santos	(Philippines) Rachel Daquis
CCS	Creamline Cool Smashers	Republic Biscuit Corporation	(Philippines) Sherwin Meneses	(Philippines) Alyssa Valdez
PGA	Petro Gazz Angels	PetroGazz Ventures Phils. Corp.	(Philippines) Arnold Laniog	(Philippines) Chie Saet
PLD	PLDT High Speed Hitters	PLDT Inc.	(Philippines) George Pascua	(Philippines) Rhea Dimaculangan
Foreign guest team
KWT	KingWhale Taipei	Enterprise Volleyball League	(Chinese Taipei) Teng Yen-Min	(Chinese Taipei) Liao Yi-Jen

- On August 6, the league announced that the Philippines women's national team would replace Kobe Shinwa Women's University due to COVID-19 concerns in Japan. The national team was eligible to vie for the championship.
- A day after the announcement of the supposed entrance of the Philippine national team into the tournament, the team begged off due to concerns of possible injuries that the players might sustain. The final round would only consist of five teams (top four local clubs, one guest club). The team's core was composed of players and staff from the National University (NU) Lady Bulldogs. NU players and staff were released from the national team program by the Philippine National Volleyball Federation shortly after their withdrawal. The team was due to participate in the 2022 Asian Women's Volleyball Cup and the new core of the squad was planned to compose the best finishing non-guest team in the conference.

== Venues ==
The preliminary games started at Filoil Flying V Center, beginning the conference with live spectators. All of the elimination playdates were held there, with the exemption of the match between Army Black Mamba and PLDT, and Creamline and Choco Mucho, which were held at the SM Mall of Asia Arena, and matches between Petro Gazz and Chery Tiggo, and Cignal and Creamline, which took place in the Santa Rosa Sports Complex. After the preliminaries, the semifinals were held at Ynares Center, MOA Arena and Filoil Flying V Center, with most of the games taking place at the latter. The finals were held at the MOA Arena.

Preliminaries	Preliminaries, semifinals
Santa Rosa City	San Juan City
Santa Rosa Sports Complex	Filoil EcoOil Centre
Capacity: 5,700	Capacity: 6,000
Semifinals	Preliminaries, semifinals, finals
Antipolo	Pasay City
Ynares Center	SM Mall of Asia Arena
Capacity: 7,400	Capacity: 15,000

== Transactions ==
=== National team players ===
- The following players are part of the national team that played in the Philippine National Volleyball Federation (PNVF) International Challenge on June 11–12.

Team	Player/s			
Chery Tiggo 7 Pro Crossovers	Mylene Paat	—N/a		
Choco Mucho Flying Titans	Aduke Ogunsanya	Kat Tolentino	—N/a	
Creamline Cool Smashers	Tots Carlos	Jema Galanza	Kyle Negrito	Alyssa Valdez
PLDT High Speed Hitters	Kath Arado	Dell Palomata	—N/a	

=== Team additions and transfers ===
The following are the players who transferred to another team for the upcoming conference.

Player	Moving from (last team)	Moving to
Alina Bicar	BaliPure Purest Water Defenders	Chery Tiggo Crossovers
Jacqueline Acuña	NU Lady Bulldogs (UAAP)	Cignal HD Spikers
Lorie Lyn Bernardo	UP Fighting Maroons (UAAP)	Creamline Cool Smashers
Marian Buitre	BaliPure Purest Water Defenders	Petro Gazz Angels
Erika Santos	De La Salle Lady Archers (UAAP)	PLDT High Speed Hitters

=== Coaching changes ===
Team	Outgoing coach	Manner of departure	Replaced by	Ref
Chery Tiggo Crossovers	(Philippines) Aaron Velez	Replaced	(Philippines) Clarence Esteban	
Petro Gazz Angels	(Philippines) Jerry Yee	Replaced	(Philippines) Arnold Laniog	

== Format ==
The following format was conducted for the entirety of the conference:

Preliminary round

1. Single-round robin preliminaries; seven local teams; teams are ranked using the FIVB ranking system.
2. Top four local teams will advance to the final round.

Semifinals

1. Single-round robin format; top four local teams and one guest team; teams are ranked using the FIVB ranking system.
2. The 3rd and 4th ranked teams will advance to the bronze medal match.
3. The 1st and 2nd ranked teams will advance to the winner-take-all gold medal match.

Finals

1. All games are knockout matches.
2. Bronze medal: 3rd ranked team vs. 4th ranked team
3. Gold medal: 1st ranked team vs. 2nd ranked team

== Pool standing procedure ==
- First, teams are ranked by the number of matches won.
- If the number of matches won is tied, the tied teams are then ranked by match points, wherein:
  - Match won 3–0 or 3–1: 3 match points for the winner, 0 match points for the loser.
  - Match won 3–2: 2 match points for the winner, 1 match point for the loser.
- In case of any further ties, the following criteria shall be used:
  - Set ratio: the number of sets won divided by number of sets lost.
  - Point ratio: number of points scored divided by number of points allowed.
  - Head-to-head standings: any remaining tied teams are ranked based on the results of head-to-head matches involving the teams in question.

== Preliminary round ==
- All times are Philippine Standard Time (UTC+8:00).

=== Ranking ===
Pos	Team	Pld	W	L	Pts	SW	SL	SR	SPW	SPL	SPR	Qualification
1	Creamline Cool Smashers	6	5	1	15	16	5	3.200	514	439	1.171	Final round
2	PLDT High Speed Hitters	6	4	2	12	14	10	1.400	533	487	1.094	Final round
3	Cignal HD Spikers	6	4	2	11	14	10	1.400	531	520	1.021	Final round
4	Army Black Mamba Lady Troopers	6	3	3	9	11	11	1.000	483	504	0.958	Final round
5	Petro Gazz Angels	6	2	4	7	10	13	0.769	507	517	0.981	
6	Choco Mucho Flying Titans	6	2	4	6	9	14	0.643	483	526	0.918	
7	Chery Tiggo 7 Pro Crossovers	6	1	5	3	4	15	0.267	398	456	0.873	

=== Match results ===
Date	Time	Venue		Score		Set 1	Set 2	Set 3	Set 4	Set 5	Total	Report
9 Jul	14:30	SJA	Cignal HD Spikers	3–1	Army Black Mamba Lady Troopers	25–17	21–25	25–20	25–20		96–82	P2
9 Jul	17:30	SJA	Choco Mucho Flying Titans	3–0	Chery Tiggo 7 Pro Crossovers	25–21	25–21	25–23			75–65	P2
12 Jul	14:30	SJA	Chery Tiggo 7 Pro Crossovers	0–3	PLDT High Speed Hitters	18–25	19–25	14–25			51–75	P2
12 Jul	17:30	SJA	Creamline Cool Smashers	3–1	Petro Gazz Angels	25–22	23–25	25–22	25–20		98–89	P2
14 Jul	14:30	SJA	Cignal HD Spikers	3–2	Choco Mucho Flying Titans	24–26	19–25	25–16	25–21	15–11	108–99	P2
14 Jul	17:30	SJA	Army Black Mamba Lady Troopers	3–1	Petro Gazz Angels	25–22	25–16	21–25	25–23		96–86	P2
16 Jul	14:30	SJA	PLDT High Speed Hitters	0–3	Creamline Cool Smashers	22–25	16–25	21–25			59–75	P2
16 Jul	17:30	SJA	Chery Tiggo 7 Pro Crossovers	0–3	Cignal HD Spikers	23–25	16–25	18–25			57–75	P2
19 Jul	14:30	SJA	Choco Mucho Flying Titans	1–3	Army Black Mamba Lady Troopers	22–25	25–22	24–26	19–25		90–98	P2
19 Jul	17:30	SJA	PLDT High Speed Hitters	3–2	Petro Gazz Angels	22–25	25–22	25–17	21–25	16–14	109–103	P2
21 Jul	14:30	SRSC	Petro Gazz Angels	0–3	Chery Tiggo 7 Pro Crossovers	22–25	14–25	21–25			57–75	P2
21 Jul	17:30	SRSC	Cignal HD Spikers	3–1	Creamline Cool Smashers	25–21	26–24	14–25	25–22		90–92	P2
23 Jul	14:30	MOA	Army Black Mamba Lady Troopers	1–3	PLDT High Speed Hitters	25–17	11–25	20–25	18–25		74–92	P2
23 Jul	17:30	MOA	Creamline Cool Smashers	3–0	Choco Mucho Flying Titans	25–22	25–14	25–22			75–58	P2
26 Jul	14:30	SJA	Army Black Mamba Lady Troopers	3–0	Chery Tiggo 7 Pro Crossovers	25–20	25–23	25–22			75–65	P2
26 Jul	17:30	SJA	Petro Gazz Angels	3–1	Cignal HD Spikers	19–25	25–14	25–23	25–14		94–76	P2
28 Jul	14:30	SJA	Choco Mucho Flying Titans	3–2	PLDT High Speed Hitters	25–21	25–17	22–25	10–25	16–14	98–102	P2
28 Jul	17:30	SJA	Chery Tiggo 7 Pro Crossovers	1–3	Creamline Cool Smashers	14–25	20–25	25–21	26–28		85–99	P2
30 Jul	11:30	SJA	Creamline Cool Smashers	3–0	Army Black Mamba Lady Troopers	25–20	25–22	25–16			75–58	P2
30 Jul	14:30	SJA	PLDT High Speed Hitters	3–1	Cignal HD Spikers	25–19	25–20	21–25	25–22		96–86	P2
30 Jul	17:30	SJA	Petro Gazz Angels	3–0	Choco Mucho Flying Titans	28–26	25–21	25–16			78–63	P2

== Final round ==
- All times are Philippine Standard Time (UTC+8:00).

=== Semifinals ===
==== Ranking ====
Pos	Team	Pld	W	L	Pts	SW	SL	SR	SPW	SPL	SPR	Qualification
1	KingWhale Taipei	4	4	0	10	12	5	2.400	381	351	1.085	Championship match
2	Creamline Cool Smashers	4	3	1	9	11	6	1.833	378	346	1.092	Championship match
3	PLDT High Speed Hitters	4	2	2	8	10	7	1.429	375	365	1.027	3rd place match
4	Cignal HD Spikers	4	1	3	2	5	11	0.455	335	364	0.920	3rd place match
5	Army Black Mamba Lady Troopers	4	0	4	1	3	12	0.250	318	367	0.866	

==== Match results ====
Date	Time	Venue		Score		Set 1	Set 2	Set 3	Set 4	Set 5	Total	Report
02 Aug	16:00	SJA	PLDT High Speed Hitters	3–0	Army Black Mamba Lady Troopers	25–22	25–18	25–21			75–61	P2
04 Aug	14:30	YCA	Army Black Mamba Lady Troopers	1–3	Creamline Cool Smashers	21–25	25–23	19–25	17–25		82–98	P2
04 Aug	17:30	YCA	Cignal HD Spikers	1–3	PLDT High Speed Hitters	25–15	13–25	23–25	23–25		84–90	P2
06 Aug	14:30	YCA	Army Black Mamba Lady Troopers	2–3	Cignal HD Spikers	24–26	28–26	18–25	25–18	14–16	109–111	P2
06 Aug	17:30	YCA	Creamline Cool Smashers	3–2	PLDT High Speed Hitters	22–25	25–27	25–21	25–19	15–12	112–104	P2
08 Aug	14:30	MOA	KingWhale Taipei	3–0	Army Black Mamba Lady Troopers	26–24	25–18	26–24			77–66	P2
08 Aug	17:30	MOA	Cignal HD Spikers	0–3	Creamline Cool Smashers	17–25	15–25	22–25			54–75	P2
09 Aug	16:00	MOA	PLDT High Speed Hitters	2–3	KingWhale Taipei	25–23	20–25	23–25	25–20	13–15	106–108	P2
12 Aug	16:00	SJA	Creamline Cool Smashers	2–3	KingWhale Taipei	15–25	25–17	22–25	26–24	5–15	93–106	P2
13 Aug	16:00	SJA	KingWhale Taipei	3–1	Cignal HD Spikers	25–18	15–25	25–21	25–22		90–86	P2

=== Finals ===
==== 3rd place match ====
Date	Time	Venue		Score		Set 1	Set 2	Set 3	Set 4	Set 5	Total	Report
14 Aug	14:30	MOA	PLDT High Speed Hitters	2–3	Cignal HD Spikers	25–17	25–20	25–27	22–25	5–15	102–104	P2

==== Championship match ====
Date	Time	Venue		Score		Set 1	Set 2	Set 3	Set 4	Set 5	Total	Report
14 Aug	17:30	MOA	Creamline Cool Smashers	3–0	KingWhale Taipei	25–21	25–19	25–8			75–48	P2

== Final standing ==
Rank	Team
1st place, gold medalist(s)	Creamline Cool Smashers
2nd place, silver medalist(s)	KingWhale Taipei
3rd place, bronze medalist(s)	Cignal HD Spikers
4	PLDT High Speed Hitters
5	Army Black Mamba Lady Troopers
6	Petro Gazz Angels
7	Choco Mucho Flying Titans
8	Chery Tiggo 7 Pro Crossovers

2022 PVL Invitational champions
Creamline Cool Smashers
Fifth title

Team roster
Alyssa Valdez (c), Celine Domingo, Risa Sato, Jeanette Panaga, Tots Carlos, Michele Gumabao, Ella de Jesus, Lorielyn Bernardo, Pau Soriano, Kyla Atienza, Jia de Guzman, Fille Cayetano, Kyle Negrito, Rizza Mandapat, Rosemarie Vargas, Jema Galanza
Head coach
Sherwin Meneses

== Awards and medalists ==
=== Individual awards ===
Award	Player	Team	Ref
Conference Most Valuable Player	Tots Carlos	Creamline	
Finals Most Valuable Player	Celine Domingo	Creamline	
1st Best Outside Spiker	Alyssa Valdez	Creamline	
2nd Best Outside Spiker	Frances Molina	Cignal	
1st Best Middle Blocker	Mika Reyes	PLDT	
2nd Best Middle Blocker	Dell Palomata	PLDT	
Best Opposite Spiker	Tots Carlos	Creamline	
Best Setter	Liao Yi-Jen	KingWhale Taipei	
Best Libero	Qiu Shi-Qing	KingWhale Taipei	

=== Medalists ===
Gold	Silver	Bronze
Creamline Cool Smashers Alyssa Valdez (c); Celine Domingo; Risa Sato; Jeanette Panaga; Michele Gumabao; Ella de Jesus (L); Lorielyn Bernardo; Pau Soriano; Kyla Atienza (L); Jia de Guzman; Fille Cayetano; Kyle Negrito; Rizza Mandapat; Rosemarie Vargas; Jema Galanza Head coach: Sherwin Meneses	KingWhale Taipei Liao Yi-Jen (c); Germina Jacobs; Chen Li-Jung; Chen Li-Jun; Chen Chieh; Ting Pei-yin; Beatriz Flavio de Carvalho; Tsai Qin-Yao; Hsieh Po-Ya; Chen I-Ling (L); Wang Yu-Wen; Khandsuren Gantogtokh; Qiu Shi-Qing (L); Chang Chih Hsuan Head Coach: Teng Yen-Min	Cignal HD Spikers Rachel Daquis (c); Glaudine Troncoso; Jacqueline Acuña; Maristela Genn Layug; Frances Molina; Angeli Pauline Araneta; Fatima Bia General (L); Roselyn Doria; Jerilli Malabanan; Angelique Dionela (L); Klarisa Abriam; Ria Meneses; Ayel Estrañero; Gel Cayuna Head Coach: Cesael Delos Santos

== 2022 Asian Women's Volleyball Cup ==
As announced on August 7, the Philippine National Volleyball Federation stated that the best performing local team of the invitational conference would represent the Philippines in the 2022 Asian Women's Volleyball Cup. As the semifinal round progressed, the PLDT High Speed Hitters was the first to initially accept its invitation to possibly participate in the mentioned tourney, as the other top teams, Creamline and Cignal, had yet to express interest to join.

In spite of that, Creamline was to represent the country, since they accepted the federation's invitation to suit up in the national team as they emerged as the champions of the invitational conference.

== Statistics leaders ==
=== Preliminary round ===
Statistics leaders correct at the end of preliminary round.

Best Scorers
Rank	Name	Points
1	Tots Carlos	114
2	Kat Tolentino	91
3	Aiza Maizo-Pontillas	87
4	Jema Galanza	86
5	Jovelyn Gonzaga	85

Best Spikers
Rank	Name	%Eff
1	Tots Carlos	38.15
2	Jema Galanza	36.28
3	Kat Tolentino	34.22
4	Aiza Maizo-Pontillas	33.60
5	Jovelyn Gonzaga	30.86

Best Blockers
Rank	Name	Avg
1	Mika Reyes	0.88
2	Marivic Meneses	0.67
3	MJ Phillips	0.57
4	Dell Palomata	0.50
5	Gel Cayuna	0.46

Best Servers
Rank	Name	Avg
1	Gel Cayuna	0.46
2	Ivy Perez	0.36
3	Alina Bicar	0.32
4	Shaya Adorador	0.32
5	Mary Remy Joy Palma	0.30

Best Diggers
Rank	Name	Avg
1	Dennise Lazaro-Revilla	5.43
2	Shiela Marie Pineda	5.35
3	Jovelyn Gonzaga	5.00
4	Anngela Nunag	4.50
5	Kath Arado	3.92

Best Setters
Rank	Name	Avg
1	Julia Melissa De Guzman	6.62
2	Relea Ferina Saet	5.30
3	Ivy Perez	5.27
4	Rhea Dimaculangan	5.00
5	Deanna Wong	4.78

Best Receivers
Rank	Name	%Succ
1	Dennise Lazaro-Revilla	50.69
2	Kyla Atienza	43.87
3	Jovelyn Gonzaga	43.41
4	Fiola Mae Ceballos	40.83
5	Shiela Marie Pineda	39.23

=== Final round ===
Statistics leaders correct as of Day 5 (August 9, 2022) of the final round.

Best Scorers
Rank	Name	Points
1	Tots Carlos	67
2	Dell Palomata	64
3	Mika Reyes	57
4	Jovelyn Gonzaga	48
5	Jules Samonte	47

Best Spikers
Rank	Name	%Eff
1	Mika Reyes	40.94
2	Tots Carlos	38.00
3	Beatrz Flavio de Carvalho	36.84
4	Alyssa Valdez	30.51
5	Frances Molina	28.37

Best Blockers
Rank	Name	Avg
1	Jeanette Panaga	0.75
2	Jeanette Villareal	0.60
3	Tots Carlos	0.58
4	Celine Domingo	0.42
5	Wang Yu-Wen	0.38

Best Servers
Rank	Name	Avg
1	Toni Rose Basas	0.47
2	Gel Cayuna	0.42
3	Beatrz Flavio de Carvalho	0.25
4	Tots Carlos	0.25
5	Fiola Mae Ceballos	0.24

Best Diggers
Rank	Name	Avg
1	Angela Nunag	5.33
2	Jovelyn Gonzaga	4.13
3	Qiu Shi-Qing	4.13
4	Kath Arado	3.76
5	Kyla Atienza	3.67

Best Setters
Rank	Name	Avg
1	Liao Yi-Jen	7.25
2	Jia de Guzman	6.42
3	Rhea Dimaculangan	6.24
4	Gel Cayuna	5.42
5	Ivy Perez	2.67

Best Receivers
Rank	Name	%Succ
1	Frances Molina	47.44
2	Chen Li-Jun	43.48
3	Chen Chieh	42.55
4	Kyla Atienza	41.49
5	Rachel Daquis	41.27
