= Barbie Jamili =

Filipino volleyball player

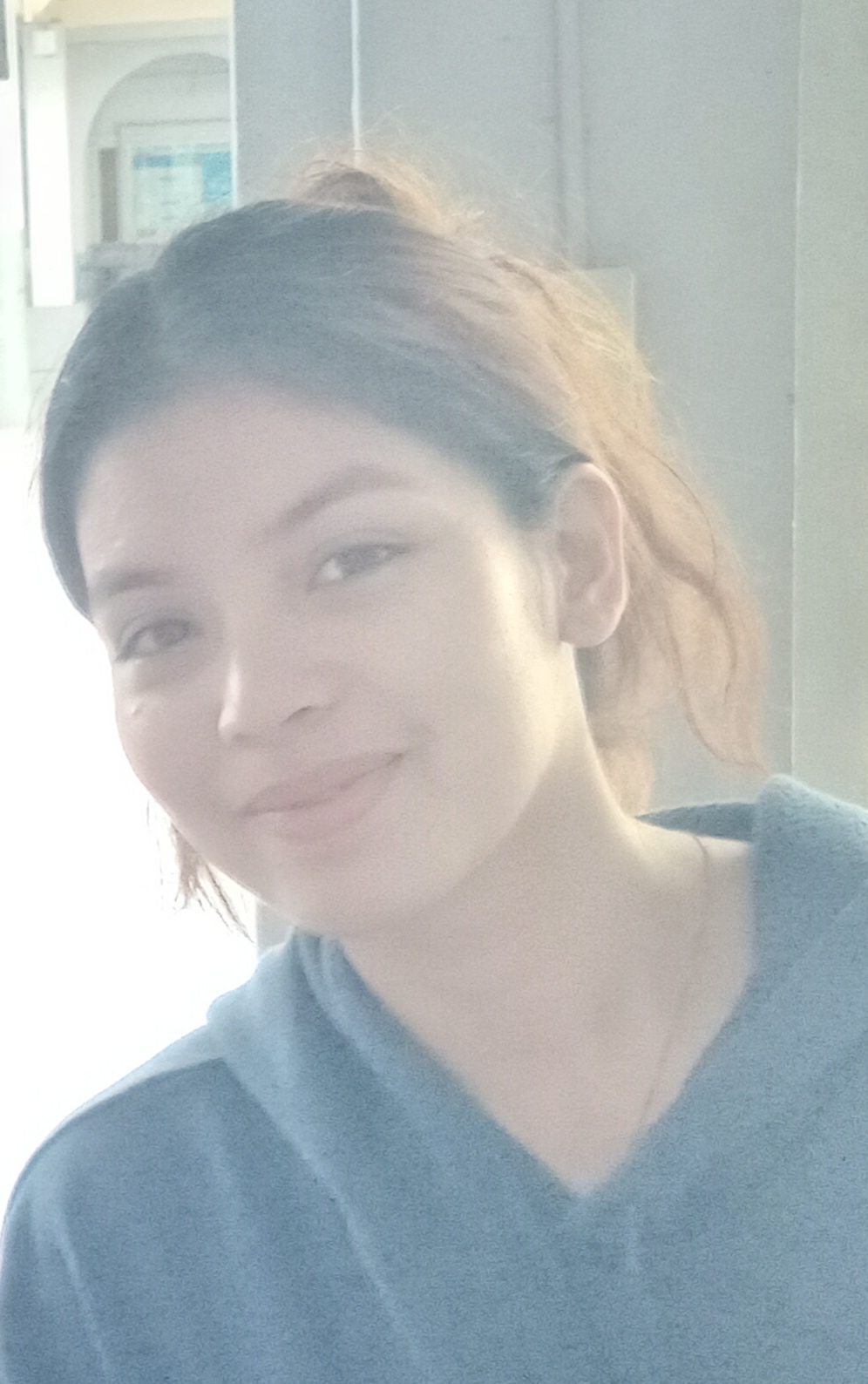

Personal information
- Full name: Jimi Jean Jamili
- Nickname: Barbie
- Nationality: Filipino
- Born: March 15, 2003 (age 23)
- Hometown: Liloan, Cebu, Philippines
- Height: 5 ft 5 in (1.65 m)
- Education: Adamson University

Volleyball information
- Position: Outside hitter
- Current club: Creamline Cool Smashers

Career
Years	Teams
2026–present	Creamline Cool Smashers

Jimi Jean "Barbie" Jamili (born March 15, 2003) is a Filipino professional volleyball player who is an outside hitter for the Creamline Cool Smashers of the Premier Volleyball League (PVL). In college, she played for the Adamson Lady Falcons of the University Athletic Association of the Philippines (UAAP).

== Education ==
Jamili studied at the National University Nazareth School where she played for its volleyball team. After graduating from high school, she enrolled at the Far Eastern University for her freshman year to pursue a tourism degree. However she dropped out to take care of a medical emergency concerning her father in Cebu intending to continue her studies in her home province. She would returned to Manila to enroll at the Adamson University.

== Career ==
=== Collegiate ===
Jamili was recruited to play for the FEU Lady Tamaraws and played for the team in the 2022 Shakey's Super League Pre-season Championship and the 2022 V-League Collegiate Challenge

She then moved to the Adamson Soaring Falcons but had to serve one year of residency before she could play in the University Athletic Association of the Philippines (UAAP). She debuted in March 2024 during UAAP Season 86. She played until Season 88 when Adamson reached the Final Four. She forego her final year of eligibility to turn professional.

=== Club ===
Jamili was picked 8th overall by the Creamline Cool Smashers in the 2026 draft of the Premier Volleyball League.
