= Kyle Negrito =

Filipino volleyball player (born 1996)

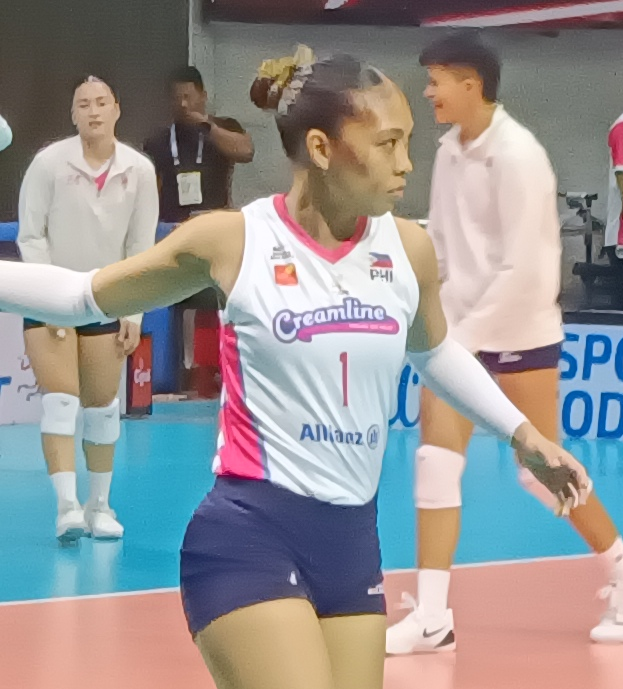
- Negrito in 2025

Personal information
- Full name: Kyle Angela Negrito
- Nationality: Filipino
- Born: December 15, 1996 (age 29); Naga, Camarines Sur, Philippines
- Hometown: Bacoor, Cavite, Philippines
- Height: 172 cm (5 ft 8 in)
- Weight: 65 kg (143 lb)
- Education: Far Eastern University

Volleyball information
- Position: Setter
- Current team: Creamline Cool Smashers
- Number: 1

National team
2021–2022	Philippines

Kyle Angela Negrito (born December 15, 1996) is a Filipino professional volleyball player who is a setter for the Creamline Cool Smashers of the Premier Volleyball League (PVL).

== Volleyball career ==
=== UAAP ===
Negrito was a member of FEU Lady Tamaraws collegiate women's University and she played Setter for the team.

In 2019, Negrito played her final year in the UAAP.

=== Professional career ===
She made her first professional club stint playing in the now defunct Philippine Super Liga for the Foton Tornadoes in the 2016/17 season before her debut in the Premier Volleyball League (PVL).

In 2018, Negrito joined Tacloban Fighting Warays in the PVL.

In 2019, Negrito was signed by the Creamline Cool Smashers.

== Clubs ==
- (Philippines) Petron Tri-Activ Spikers (2016)
- (Philippines) Foton Tornadoes (Note: Foton Tornadoes were rebranded to its current entity Chery Tiggo Crossovers in 2020, playing in the PVL from 2021–2025.) (2017)
- (Philippines) Tacloban Fighting Warays (2018)
- (Philippines) Creamline Cool Smashers (2018–present)

=== International ===
- (Philippines) Philippine national team (2022–2023)

== Awards ==
=== Individual ===
MVP Award	Positional Award	Total
1 (2024)	2 (2024, 2024)	3

=== Collegiate ===
Year	League	Season/Conference	Title	Ref
2015	SVL	Collegiate	3rd Place	
2016	UAAP	78	3rd Place	
2017	PVL	Collegiate	Runner-up	
2018	UAAP	80	Runner-up	
2018	PVL	Collegiate	Runner-up	

=== Clubs ===
Year	Season/Conference	Club	Title	Ref
2019	Reinforced	Creamline Cool Smashers	Runner-up	
2019	Open	Creamline Cool Smashers	Champions	
2021	Open	Creamline Cool Smashers	Runner-up	
2022	Open	Creamline Cool Smashers	Champions	
2022	Invitational	Creamline Cool Smashers	Champions	
2022	Reinforced	Creamline Cool Smashers	3rd Place	
2023	1st All-Filipino	Creamline Cool Smashers	Champions	
2023	Invitational	Creamline Cool Smashers	Runner-up	
2023	2nd All-Filipino	Creamline Cool Smashers	Champions	
2024	All-Filipino	Creamline Cool Smashers	Champions	
2024	Reinforced	Creamline Cool Smashers	Champions	
2024	Invitational	Creamline Cool Smashers	Champions	
2024–25	All-Filipino	Creamline Cool Smashers	Runner-up	
2025	on Tour	Creamline Cool Smashers	Bronze	
2025	Invitational	Creamline Cool Smashers	Bronze	
2026	All-Filipino	Creamline Cool Smashers	Champions	
