= Sherwin Meneses =

Filipino volleyball coach (born 1982)

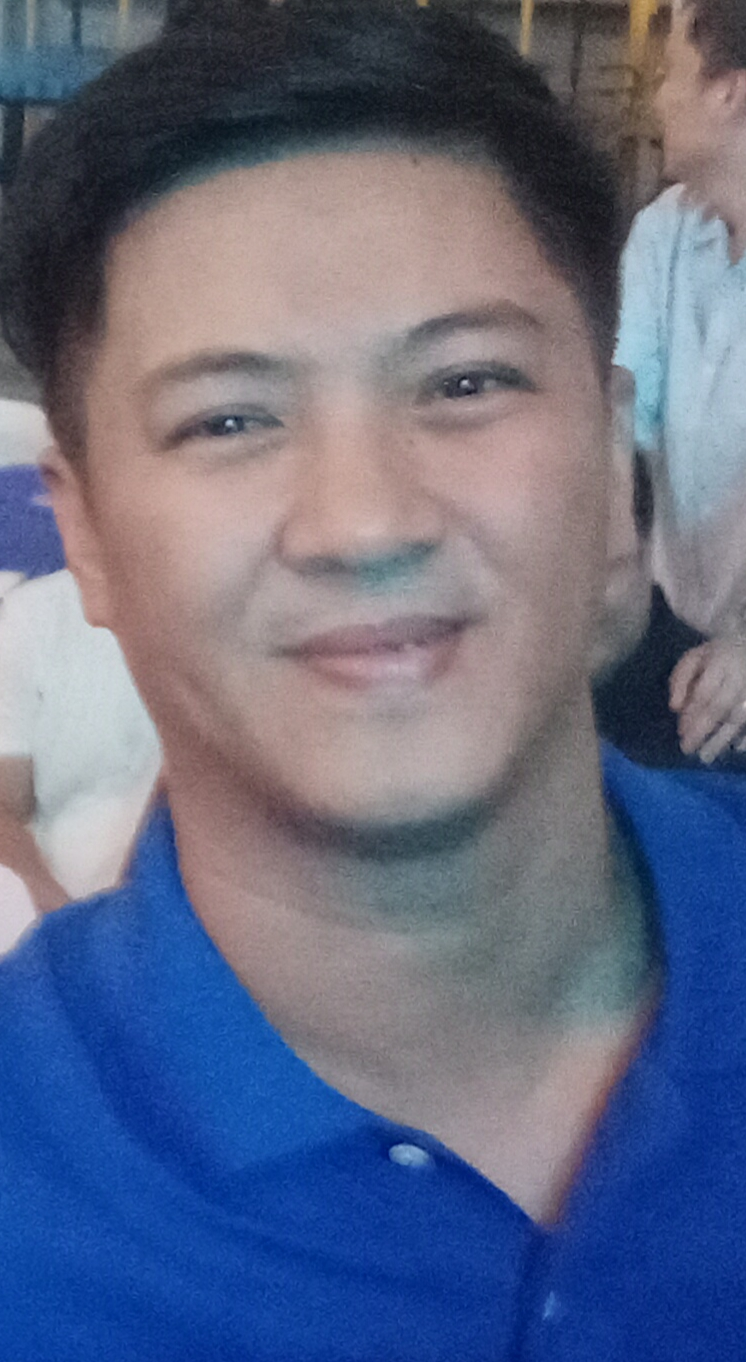
- Meneses in 2024

Personal information
- Nationality: Filipino
- Born: July 20, 1982 (age 44)
- Education: Adamson University

Coaching information
- Current team: Creamline Cool Smashers; NU Lady Bulldogs
- Previous teams coached
- Years: Teams
- 2012–2016; 2009–2024; 2018; 2022–present; 2022; 2024–2025; 2024: Adamson Lady Falcons; Arellano Chiefs; Generika-Ayala Lifesavers; Creamline Cool Smashers; Philippines (women); NU Lady Bulldogs; Monolith Skyrisers

Sherwin Meneses (born July 20, 1982) is a Filipino volleyball coach who currently serves as head coach for the Creamline Cool Smashers of the Premier Volleyball League (PVL), where he won seven titles. He is also the head coach of the NU Lady Bulldogs volleyball program that won back-to-back UAAP women's volleyball tournament titles in 2024 and 2025.

He also coached the Adamson Lady Falcons in the UAAP and the Arellano Chiefs in the National Collegiate Athletic Association (NCAA).

== Career ==
Meneses is a former player for the Adamson Falcons. He and Mike Alinsunurin won the Nestea Beach Volleyball crown in Boracay in 2006.

== Coaching career ==
=== Collegiate ===
==== Adamson Lady Falcons ====
Sherwin Meneses has been the coach of the Lady Falcons, Adamson University's women's volleyball team from 2012 to 2016. He resigned from his post on March 10, 2016, while UAAP Season 78 was still underway due to a dispute with the management. Under his coaching the Falcons reached the Final Four twice. Other players including captain Mylene Paat left the team.

Adamson University awarded Meneses as one of the 2024 Outstanding Alumni in Sports, Culture and Arts.

==== Arellano Chiefs ====
Meneses moved to the Arellano Chiefs in the National Collegiate Athletic Association.

==== NU Lady Bulldogs ====
In August 2024, Meneses became coach of the NU Lady Bulldogs. NU considered national team coach Jorge Edson and Akari Chargers coach Taka Minowa for the role left by Norman Miguel. Meneses accepted the role adding to his current position as head coach of Creamline. His wife and daughter have studied at NU.

The Lady Bulldogs played at the 2024 Asian Women's Club Volleyball Championship under the club name Monolith Skyrisers. They finished sixth. He would be formally signed as coach for the Lady Bulldogs for the UAAP on October 1, 2024.

Meneses and the Lady Bulldogs won the 2024 Shakey's Super League Pre-season Championship over the DLSU Lady Spikers. The latter lost again, 0–2, in the finals as NU claimed back-to-back UAAP crowns in May 2025. Meneses left the team in September 2025 and was replaced by Regine Diego.

=== Club ===
==== Generika ====
Meneses coached the now-defunct Generika-Ayala Lifesavers of the Philippine Super Liga and led the Arellano men's volleyball team to a runner-up finish in the NCAA Season 93.

==== Creamline ====
Meneses was tapped to coach the Creamline Cool Smashers of the Premier Volleyball League (PVL). He won his first title as a head coach when he helped Creamline win the 2022 Open Conference title.

Leaning on Tots Carlos and Jema Galanza who were the top two highest pointers for Creamline, Meneses won his second title as a pro head coach in the 2022 Invitational Conference and went on to win a third straight championship.

Meneses was tapped to the coaching staff of the national team with seven of its players coming from Creamline – Tots Carlos, Jema Galanza, Michele Gumabao, Jia Morado, Kyla Atienza, Celine Domingo, and Alyssa Valdez – set to participate in the 32nd Southeast Asian Games in Cambodia in May 2023 after the Cool Smashers successfully defended their PVL All-Filipino Conference title against the Petro Gazz Angels last March 30, 2023.

Meneses guided the Cool Smashers to their 4-peat and 8th title overall in the PVL on May 12, 2024.

Creamline won its first grand slam and 10th title overall without the usual MVP-veterans as starters last September 12, 2024, equally making Meneses the first grand slam coach in the women's pro league in the Philippines.

In March 2025, Meneses won his 100th game during Game 1 of the 2024–25 All-Filipino Conference quarterfinals. Creamline lost the final to Petro Gazz.

=== National team ===
Creamline as the Philippine national team took part at the 2022 Asian Women's Volleyball Cup under the tutelage of Meneses.

== Honors ==
Creamline:

- 7 Premier Volleyball League: 2022 Open, 2022 Invitational, 2023 First All-Filipino, 2023 Second All-Filipino, 2024 All-Filipino, 2024 Reinforced, 2024 Invitational
  - Runner-up 2:2023 Invitational, 2024–25 All-Filipino
