= Jeanette Panaga =

Filipina volleyball player

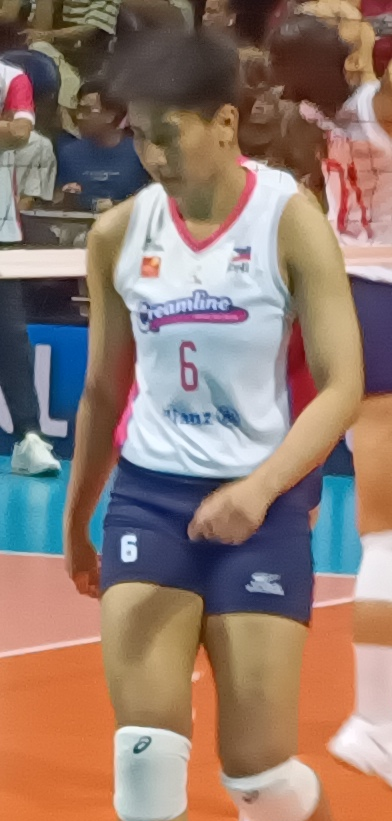
- Panaga in 2025

Personal information
- Full name: Jeanette Ellar Panaga
- Nickname: Pangs
- Nationality: Filipino
- Born: July 31, 1994 (age 32)
- Hometown: Limay, Bataan, Philippines
- Height: 183 cm (6 ft 0 in)
- Weight: 68 kg (150 lb)
- Education: De La Salle–College of Saint Benilde

Volleyball information
- Position: Middle Blocker
- Current club: Creamline Cool Smashers
- Number: 6

Career
| Years | Teams |
|---|---|
| 2012–2016 | Benilde Lady Blazers |
| 2016 | Cignal HD Spikers |
| 2017–2018 | Pocari Sweat Lady Warriors |
| 2019–2020 | Petro Gazz Angels |
| 2021–present | Creamline Cool Smashers |

National team
| 2015, 2022–present | Philippines |

Jeanette Ellar Panaga (born July 31, 1994) is a Filipina volleyball player who is a middle blocker for the Creamline Cool Smashers of the Premier Volleyball League.

In 2026, she became the first player in PVL history to be selected to the All-Premier Team ten times.

== Career ==
=== College ===
Panaga played for the De La Salle–College of Saint Benilde and won one National Collegiate Athletic Association title.

=== Club ===
Panaga was playing for Cignal HD Spikers in the Philippine Super Liga in 2016.

She later joined the Pocari Sweat Lady Warriors of the Premier Volleyball League.

In 2019, Panaga moved to the Petro Gazz Angels.

In 2021, Panaga moved to the Creamline Cool Smashers.

== Personal life ==
Panaga has Michelle Morente as her partner. She married Morente through a US-based online marriage service in December 2025. They first publicized their relationship in 2019.

== Awards ==
=== Individual ===
- 2014 NCAA Season 91 "Best Attacker"
- 2014 NCAA Season 91 "Best Blocker"
- 2015 NCAA Season 91 "Best Blocker"
- 2015 NCAA Season 91 "Finals Most Valuable Player"
- 2017 Premier Volleyball Reinforced Conference "2nd Best Middle Blocker"
- 2017 Premier Volleyball Open Conference "1st Best Middle Blocker"
- 2018 Premier Volleyball League Reinforced Conference "1st Best Middle Blocker"
- 2019 Premier Volleyball League Open Conference "2nd Best Middle Blocker"
- 2023 Premier Volleyball League All-Filipino Conference "1st Best Middle Blocker"
- 2024 Premier Volleyball League All-Filipino Conference "2nd Best Middle Blocker"
- 2025 Premier Volleyball League on Tour "1st Best Middle Blocker"
- 2025 Premier Volleyball League Invitational Conference "1st Best Middle Blocker"

=== Collegiate ===
- 2013 NCAA Season 89 – Bronze medal, with Benilde Lady Blazers
- 2015 NCAA Season 91 – Champions, with Benilde Lady Blazers

=== Club ===
- 2017 Premier Volleyball Reinforced Conference – Champions, with Pocari Sweat Lady Warriors
- 2017 Premier Volleyball Open Conference – Runner-up, with Pocari Sweat Lady Warriors
- 2019 Premier Volleyball League Reinforced Conference – Champions, with Petro Gazz Angels
- 2019 Premier Volleyball League Open Conference – Runner-up, with Petro Gazz Angels
- 2021 Premier Volleyball League Open Conference – Runner-up, with Creamline Cool Smashers
- 2022 Premier Volleyball League Open Conference – Champions, with Creamline Cool Smashers
- 2022 Premier Volleyball League Invitational Conference – Champions, with Creamline Cool Smashers
- 2022 Premier Volleyball League Reinforced Conference – Bronze medal, with Creamline Cool Smashers
- 2023 Premier Volleyball League Invitational Conference – Runner-up, with Creamline Cool Smashers
- 2023 Premier Volleyball League Second All-Filipino Conference – Champion, with Creamline Cool Smashers
- 2024 Premier Volleyball League All-Filipino Conference – Champions, with Creamline Cool Smashers
- 2024 Premier Volleyball League Reinforced Conference – Champions, with Creamline Cool Smashers
- 2025 Premier Volleyball League on Tour Preseason Conference "1st Best Outside Hitter" - Bronze medal, with Creamline
- 2025 Premier Volleyball League Invitational Conference" - Bronze medal, with Creamline
