= Bea de Leon =

Filipino volleyball player (born 1996)

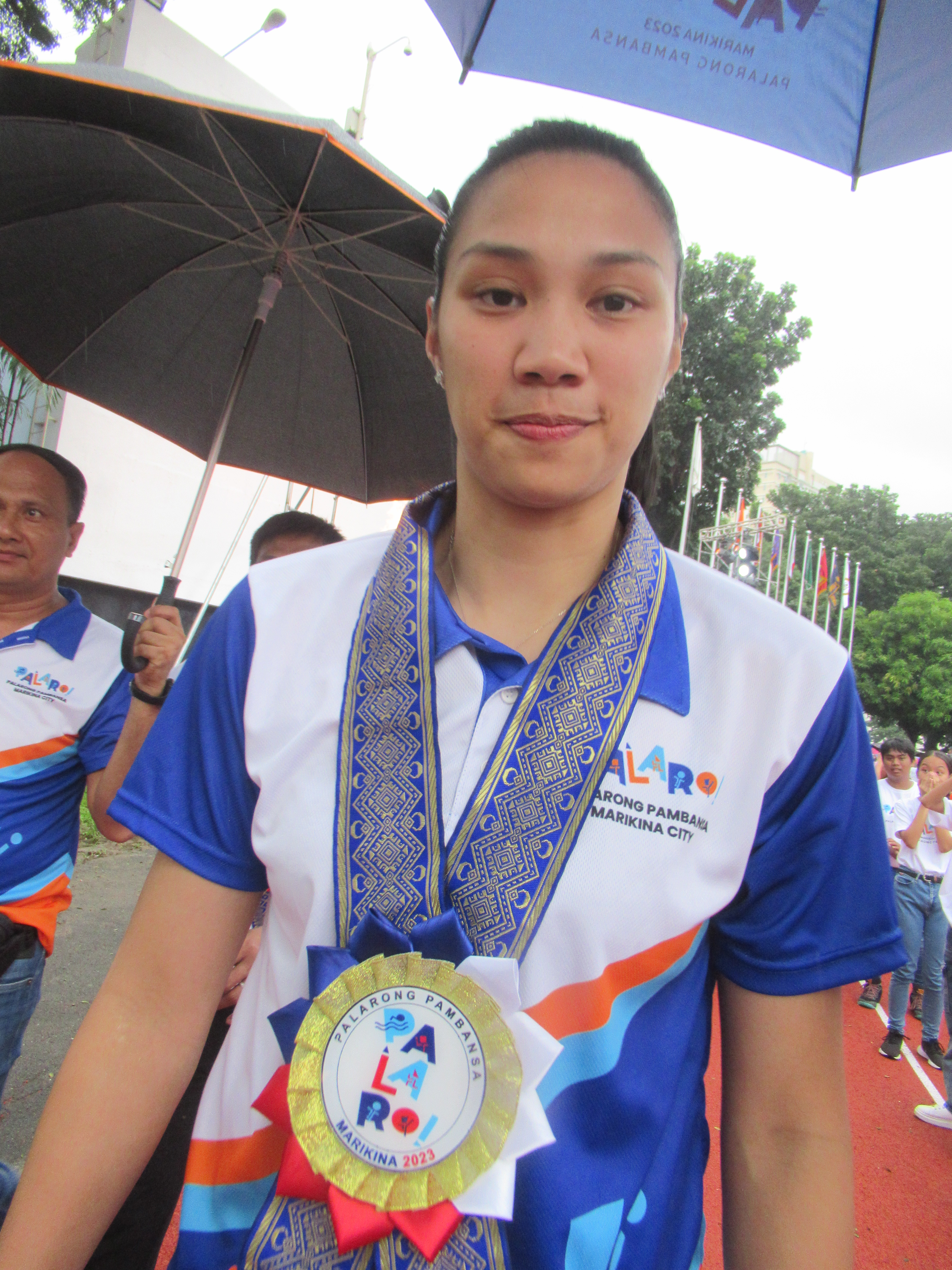

Personal information
- Full name: Isabel Beatriz Paras de Leon
- Nickname: Bea
- Nationality: Filipino
- Born: August 2, 1996 (age 30)
- Home town: Marikina, Philippines
- Education: Ateneo de Manila University
- Height: 181 cm (5 ft 11 1/2 in)
- Weight: 60 kg (130lb)

Volleyball information
- Position: Middle Hitter
- Current club: Creamline

Career
- Years: Team
- 2018: Foton Tornadoes
- 2018: Ateneo–Motolite
- 2019–2024: Choco Mucho
- 2024–present: Creamline

National team
- Years: Team
- 2015: Philippines

Isabel Beatriz "Bea" Paras de Leon (born August 2, 1996) is a Filipino professional volleyball player who is a middle blocker for the Creamline Cool Smashers of the Premier Volleyball League (PVL). She played for the Ateneo Lady Eagles in the UAAP for five straight years and in her final year, led her team to its third championship and was named the UAAP Season 81 Finals MVP.

De Leon was selected to the 2015 Philippine Women's National Volleyball Team that represented the country during U23 and 2015 SEA Games.

== Early life and education ==
She studied at St. Paul College, Pasig for grade school and Saint Pedro Poveda College for high school. She became the team captain for its high school girls' volleyball team. She also received the Athlete of the Year award for Volleyball during her graduation in Poveda.

De Leon was a consistent Dean's lister in the Ateneo and graduated with a degree in AB Management Economics. De Leon was a finalist for the Ambrosio Padilla Athlete of the Year Award in 2018, recognizing athletes of the university who excel both in academics and sports.

In 2023, she graduated her Masters degree in Sustainability Management at Ateneo Graduate Programs. An academic scholarship was also established in the Ateneo in her name.

== Collegiate career ==
De Leon's mother Det, father Elmer and brother Loel were graduates of the De La Salle University, which has a long-running rivalry with the Ateneo. Her first choice for college was also La Salle but decided to go to Ateneo because her preferred course was unavailable at the time in DLSU and she lived nearer to the former school. Veteran Ateneo players Alyssa Valdez and Denden Lazaro also influenced her to change her decision to switch schools.

In her debut game in UAAP Season 77, De Leon was an immediate starter for the Ateneo Lady Eagles. The 5'11 middle blocker established herself as a threat in the middle for the defending champions with her powerful quick hits and blocks. She was a top contender for the Rookie of the Year Award averaging 9 pts per game, but in the mid-season, she injured her right index finger in training that caused her to be sidelined for two weeks and missed three games in the process. She returned in the last game of eliminations and helped her team go back to the finals scoring 11 points against their archrival, the De La Salle Lady Spikers. They successfully defended their title against the Lady Spikers and sweep the season with a perfect 16–0 record.

On her rookie year in the Ateneo, De Leon was chosen to be a part of the National Team that represented the country in the 2015 SEA Games in Singapore.

In the collegiate conference of Shakey's V-League Season 12, De Leon was awarded with the 2nd Best Middle Blocker Award.

Following Ateneo's losses in UAAP Season 78, UAAP Season 79, and UAAP Season 80, De Leon expressed uncertainty on playing her fifth and final year with the Lady Eagles. In 2018, she signed with the Foton Tornadoes to start her semi-professional volleyball career in the Philippine Super Liga along with Jaja Santiago and Dindin Santiago. After two months of discernment, De Leon decided to play her final season of eligibility in the UAAP and served as joint Team Captain with Maddie Madayag for UAAP Season 81. Under her leadership, Ateneo won their third Championship against the UST Golden Tigresses with De Leon being named as the Finals MVP.

De Leon also represented the Ateneo in the UAAP beach volleyball championships in 2017.

== Club career ==
De Leon and Madayag joined the Choco Mucho Flying Titans in the Premier Volleyball League under Oliver Almadro in 2019, where both became team captains. In 2024, De Leon, along with Denden Lazaro transferred to the Creamline Cool Smashers.

== Other ventures ==
As co-horse breeder with her father Elmer, de Leon owns Bell Racing Stable "Bea Bell" (champions of both 2023 PHILRACOM "2-Year-Old Maiden Stakes Race" with P720,000 prize and the October 22, 2023 "2nd Leg Juvenile Stakes Race" with prize of P1,080,000 at Metro Manila Turf Club Race Track).

== Clubs ==
- (Philippines) Foton Tornadoes (2018)
- (Philippines) Ateneo–Motolite Lady Eagles (2018)
- (Philippines) Choco Mucho Flying Titans (2019–2024)
- (Philippines) Creamline Cool Smashers (2024–present)

== Individual awards ==
- 2015 Shakey's V-League Collegiate Conference 2nd Best Middle Blocker
- UAAP Season 81 Finals MVP
- Ambrosio Padilla Athlete of The Year Finalist (2018)
- Premier Volleyball League 2024-2025 All Filipino Conference Best Middle Blocker

=== Collegiate ===
- 2014 ASEAN University Games – Bronze medal, with Ateneo Lady Eagles
- 2015 UAAP Season 77 – Champion, with Ateneo Lady Eagles
- 2015 Shakey's V-League Collegiate Conference – Silver medal, with Ateneo De Manila University Lady Eagles
- 2016 UAAP Season 78 – Silver medal, with Ateneo Lady Eagles
- 2016 ASEAN University Games – Bronze medal, with Ateneo De Manila University Lady Eagles
- 2016 Shakey's V-League Collegiate Conference – Silver medal, with Ateneo De Manila University Lady Eagles
- 2017 UAAP Season 79 – Silver medal, with Ateneo Lady Eagles
- 2018 UAAP Season 80 – Bronze medal, with Ateneo Lady Eagles
- 2018 Premier Volleyball League Open Conference – Silver medal, with Ateneo Motolite Lady Eagles
- 2019 UAAP Season 81 – Champion, with Ateneo Lady Eagles

=== Clubs ===
- 2018 Premier Volleyball League Open Conference – Runner-up, with Ateneo–Motolite Lady Eagles
- 2023 VTV International Women's Volleyball Cup – Bronze medal, with Choco Mucho Flying Titans
- 2023 Premier Volleyball League Second All-Filipino Conference – 1st Runner-Up, with Choco Mucho Flying Titans
- 2024 Premier Volleyball League All-Filipino Conference – Champions, with Creamline Cool Smashers
- 2024 Premier Volleyball League Reinforced Conference – Champions, with Creamline Cool Smashers
- 2024–25 Premier Volleyball League All-Filipino Conference – 1st Runner-Up, with Creamline Cool Smashers
