= Kyla Atienza =

Filipina volleyball player (born 1997)

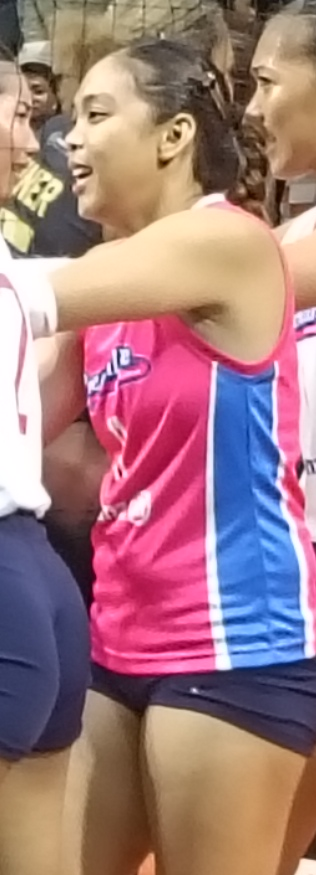
- Atienza in 2025

Personal information
- Full name: Kyla Llana Magdaraog Atienza
- Nationality: Filipino
- Born: April 12, 1997 (age 29); San Pedro, Laguna, Philippines
- Height: 1.67 m (5 ft 6 in)
- Weight: 59 kg (130 lb)
- Education: Far Eastern University

Volleyball information
- Position: Libero
- Current club: Creamline Cool Smashers
- Number: 11

Career
Years	Teams
2018–present	Creamline

Kyla Llana Magdaraog Atienza (born April 12, 1997) is a Filipino professional volleyball player who is a libero for the Creamline Cool Smashers of the Premier Volleyball League (PVL). She was a member of the FEU Lady Tamaraws volleyball team in both indoor and beach volleyball. She impressed in her debut for the Philippine team by keeping the ball alive for most of Vietnam's attacks at the AVC Cup on August 21, 2022. ASEAN Grand Prix named her Best Libero on September 11, 2022.

== Early life ==
Atienza played high school volleyball for San Pedro Relocation Center National High School along with eventual pro teammate Jema Galanza. She finished college studies at Far Eastern University in 2018.

== Clubs ==
- (Philippines) Creamline Cool Smashers (2018–present)

== Awards ==
=== Individual ===
- 2013 UAAP Season 76 Beach Volleyball "Rookie of the Year"
- 2019 Premier Volleyball League Open Conference "Best Libero"
- 2022 ASEAN Grand Prix "Best Libero"

=== Club ===
- 2018 Premier Volleyball League Reinforced Conference – Champions, with Creamline Cool Smashers
- 2018 Premier Volleyball League Open Conference – Champions, with Creamline Cool Smashers
- 2019 Premier Volleyball League Reinforced Conference – Silver medal, with Creamline Cool Smashers
- 2019 Premier Volleyball League Open Conference – Champions, with Creamline Cool Smashers
- 2021 Premier Volleyball League Open Conference – Silver medal, with Creamline Cool Smashers
- 2022 Premier Volleyball League Open Conference – Champions, with Creamline Cool Smashers
- 2022 Premier Volleyball League Invitational Conference – Champions, with Creamline Cool Smashers
- 2022 Premier Volleyball League Reinforced Conference – Bronze medal, with Creamline Cool Smashers
- 2023 Premier Volleyball League All-Filipino Conference – Champions, with Creamline Cool Smashers
- 2023 Premier Volleyball League Invitational Conference – Silver medal, with Creamline Cool Smashers
- 2023 Premier Volleyball League Second All-Filipino Conference – Champions, with Creamline Cool Smashers
- 2024 Premier Volleyball League All-Filipino Conference – Champions, with Creamline Cool Smashers
- 2024 Premier Volleyball League Reinforced Conference – Champions, with Creamline Cool Smashers
