= Denden Lazaro-Revilla =

Filipino volleyball player (born 1992)

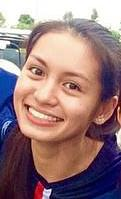
- Lazaro-Revilla in 2014

Personal information
- Full name: Dennise Michelle Garcia Lazaro-Revilla
- Nickname: Denden
- Nationality: Filipino
- Born: January 21, 1992 (age 34); Pasay, Philippines
- Hometown: Parañaque
- Height: 5 ft 5 in (1.65 m)
- Weight: 120 lb (54 kg)
- Education: Ateneo de Manila University

Volleyball information
- Position: Libero
- Number: 13

Career
| Years | Teams |
|---|---|
| 2015 | PLDT |
| 2016 | BaliPure |
| 2017–2018 | Cocolife |
| 2019 | Petron |
| 2020–2024 | Choco Mucho |
| 2024–present | Creamline |

National team
| 2008–2018 | Philippines |

Dennise Michelle "Denden" Garcia Lazaro-Revilla (born January 21, 1992) is a Filipino professional volleyball player who is a libero for the Creamline Cool Smashers of the Premier Volleyball League (PVL). Lazaro is a member of the Philippines women's national volleyball team. She played for the Ateneo Lady Eagles in college where she gained the nickname, "Iron Eagle".

== Personal life ==
She was born on January 21, 1992, in Metro Manila. She attended high school at Colegio San Agustin – Makati and completed her BS Biology degree at the Ateneo de Manila University in 2015. After graduation, Lazaro entered medical school at the Ateneo School of Medicine and Public Health. However, by the end of 2016, it was reported that Lazaro filed a leave of absence from her schooling to resume her volleyball career.

Lazaro married basketball player LA Revilla on January 27, 2020.

== Career ==
Lazaro was the Libero for the Youth U16 Girl's national team that ranked seventh in the 2008 Asian Youth Girls U16 Championships. She was member of the 2009 Palarong Pambansa NCR Girls Secondary Division team. During her collegiate years, she played for the Ateneo Lady Eagles volleyball team from 2011 to 2015 and was part of the Ateneo teams which won the UAAP Volleyball Championships in 2014 and 2015. She played beach volleyball with the Beach Volleyball Republic in since 2015.

Lazaro played with the PLDT Home Ultera Ultra Fast Hitters in the 2015 Shakey's V-League Season 12 Season Open Conference and for BaliPure Purest Water Defenders for the 2016 Shakey's V-League Season 13 Open Conference. She played in the 2015 Southeast Asian Games in Kallang, Singapore. For the 2017 PSL All-Filipino Conference, she signed with the club COCOLIFE Asset Managers in the Philippine Super Liga.

In January 2019, Lazaro transferred to the Petron Blaze Spikers. In May 2020, she moved back to PVL to signed with the Choco Mucho Flying Titans. In 2024, Lazaro transferred to the Creamline Cool Smashers.

== Clubs ==
- (Philippines) PLDT Home Ultera Ultra Fast Hitters (2015)
- (Philippines) BaliPure Purest Water Defenders (2016)
- (Philippines) United VC (COCOLIFE Asset Managers) (2017–2018)
- (Philippines) Petron Blaze Spikers (2019)
- (Philippines) Choco Mucho Flying Titans (2020–2024)
- (Philippines) Creamline Cool Smashers (2024–present)

== Awards ==
=== Individuals ===
- 2011 Shakey's V-League Southeast Asian Club Invitational "Best Digger"
- 2011 Shakey's V-League Season 8 Open Conference "Best Digger"
- 2011 Shakey's V-League Season 8 1st Conference "Best Receiver"
- 2012 Shakey's V-League 9th Season 1st Conference "Best Receiver"
- 2013–14 UAAP Season 76 "Best Digger"
- 2013–14 UAAP Season 76 "Best Receiver"
- 2014–15 UAAP Season 77 "Best Receiver"
- 2016 Shakey's V-League Season 13 Reinforced Conference "Best Libero"

=== Collegiate ===
- 2012 UAAP Season 74 volleyball tournaments – Silver medal, with Ateneo De Manila University Lady Eagles
- 2013 UAAP Season 75 volleyball tournaments – Silver medal, with Ateneo De Manila University Lady Eagles
- 2014 UAAP Season 76 volleyball tournaments – Champions, with Ateneo De Manila University Lady Eagles
- 2014 ASEAN University Games – Bronze medal, with Ateneo De Manila University Lady Eagles
- 2015 UAAP Season 77 volleyball tournaments – Champions, with Ateneo De Manila University Lady Eagles

=== Club ===
- 2015 Shakey's V-League 12th Season Open Conference – Champions, with PLDT Home Ultera Ultra Fast Hitters
- 2016 Shakey's V-League 13th Season Open Conference – Bronze medal, with BaliPure Purest Water Defenders
- 2019 Philippine Super Liga Grand Prix Conference – Champions, with Petron Blaze Spikers
- 2023 VTV International Women's Volleyball Cup – Bronze medal, with Choco Mucho Flying Titans
- 2023 Premier Volleyball League Second All-Filipino Conference – 1st Runner-up, with Choco Mucho Flying Titans
- 2024 Premier Volleyball League All-Filipino Conference – Champions, with Creamline Cool Smashers
- 2024 Premier Volleyball League Reinforced Conference – Champions, with Creamline Cool Smashers
