= 2026–27 Choco Mucho Flying Titans season =

Filipino women's volleyball team season

The 2026–27 Choco Mucho Flying Titans season will be the seventh season of the Choco Mucho Flying Titans in the Premier Volleyball League (PVL), and sixth in professional volleyball.

In the PVL on Tour. Choco Mucho Flying Titans started their PVL on Tour Showdown campaign on July 11, 2026 with a straight-sets loss to Zus Coffee Thunderbelles in Batangas City, Batangas. On July 25, 2026, PLDT High Speed Hitters dealt the Flying Titans their second loss of the on tour series with a four-set defeat in Vigan, Ilocos Sur. Choco Mucho closes out their on tour caravan with a 0-3 record on August 1, 2026, with another four-set loss to Akari Chargers in Polomolok, South Cotabato.

== Roster ==
Choco Mucho Flying Titans roster
No.	Nat.	Player	Pos.	Height	DOB	From
1	(Philippines)	Isa Molde	Outside Hitter	1.70 m (5 ft 7 in)	October 18, 1998 (age 28)	UP
2	(Philippines)	Desiree Cheng (C)	Outside Hitter	1.73 m (5 ft 8 in)	September 28, 1996 (age 30)	De La Salle
3	(Philippines)	Deanna Wong	Setter	1.73 m (5 ft 8 in)	July 18, 1998 (age 28)	Ateneo
4	(Philippines)	Mean Mendrez	Outside Hitter	1.78 m (5 ft 10 in)	November 14, 1998 (age 28)	UE
5	(Philippines)	Dawn Macandili-Catindig	Libero	1.53 m (5 ft 0 in)	June 1, 1996 (age 30)	De La Salle
6	(Philippines)	Dindin Santiago-Manabat	Opposite Hitter	1.88 m (6 ft 2 in)	September 26, 1993 (age 33)	National-U
7	(Philippines)	Maddie Madayag	Middle Blocker	1.80 m (5 ft 11 in)	February 7, 1998 (age 28)	Ateneo
8	(Philippines)	Eya Laure	Outside Hitter	1.78 m (5 ft 10 in)	March 21, 1999 (age 27)	UST
9	(Philippines)	Alina Bicar	Setter	1.68 m (5 ft 6 in)	November 17, 1997 (age 29)	UST
10	(Philippines) (Canada)	Kat Tolentino	Opposite Hitter	1.85 m (6 ft 1 in)	January 27, 1995 (age 31)	Ateneo
11	(Philippines)	Ayesha Juegos	Opposite Hitter	1.70 m (5 ft 7 in)	September 14, 2002 (age 24)	Adamson
12	(Philippines)	Tin Ubaldo	Setter	1.72 m (5 ft 8 in)	October 17, 2002 (age 24)	Far Eastern
14	(Philippines)	Jen Villegas	Middle Blocker	1.75 m (5 ft 9 in)	June 20, 2002 (age 24)	Adamson
15	(Philippines)	Jai Atienza	Middle Blocker	1.80 m (5 ft 11 in)	November 9, 1999 (age 27)	UP
16	(Philippines)	Thang Ponce	Libero	1.57 m (5 ft 2 in)	October 21, 1998 (age 28)	Adamson
17	(Philippines)	Lorraine Pecaña	Middle Blocker	1.81 m (5 ft 11 in)	April 21, 2001 (age 25)	Arellano
18	(Philippines)	Sisi Rondina	Outside Hitter	1.68 m (5 ft 6 in)	September 4, 1996 (age 30)	UST
19	(Philippines)	Ivy Jisel Perez	Setter	1.74 m (5 ft 9 in)	February 13, 1995 (age 31)	National-U
20	(Philippines)	Lorene Toring	Middle Blocker	1.83 m (6 ft 0 in)	February 17, 2000 (age 26)	Adamson
21	(Philippines)	Regine Arocha	Libero	1.71 m (5 ft 7 in)	February 21, 1997 (age 29)	Arellano
22	(Philippines)	Jewel Encarnacion	Outside Hitter	1.68 m (5 ft 6 in)	December 22, 2000 (age 25)	UP
24	(Philippines)	Caitlin Viray	Opposite Hitter	1.72 m (5 ft 8 in)	April 12, 1998 (age 28)	UST
Updated as of: October 22, 2026 | Source: PVL.ph

Coaching staff

- Head coach:
  Dante Alinsunurin
- Assistant coaches:
  Edjet Mabbayad
  Jessie Lopez
- Statistician:
  Jann Paulo Ancheta
  Aries Lim
- Strength & conditioning coach:
  Allan Jovero

Team staff

- Team manager:
  Eric Cuatico
- Team coordinator:
  Kris Alcantara

Medical staff

- Physical therapist:
  Bethel Solano

== Draft ==
Round	Pick	Player	Pos.	School
1	3	Tin Ubaldo	S	FEU

== PVL on Tour ==
=== Results summary ===
Team	Game		
Team	1	2	3
Choco Mucho (CMF)	ZUS; 0–3	HSH; 1–3	AKA; 1–3

Source: Premier Volleyball League
Legend: Blue = win; Red = loss

== All-Filipino Conference ==
=== Preliminary round ===
==== Standings ====
Pos	Team	Pld	W	L	Pts	SW	SL	SR	SPW	SPL	SPR	Qualification
1	Nxled Chameleons	7	7	0	20	21	5	4.200	618	523	1.182	Twice-to-beat in semifinals
2	Choco Mucho Flying Titans	8	5	3	15	20	15	1.333	783	736	1.064	Twice-to-beat in semifinals
3	Farm Fresh Foxies	7	5	2	14	19	13	1.462	703	680	1.034	Twice-to-win in semifinals
4	Creamline Cool Smashers	7	4	3	13	16	11	1.455	626	586	1.068	Twice-to-win in semifinals
5	PLDT High Speed Hitters	8	4	4	13	15	15	1.000	677	666	1.017	

Updated to match(es) played on November 19, 2026. Source: Premier Volleyball League

==== Match log ====
2026–27 PVL All-Filipino Conference Siklab series preliminary round match log
Total: 5–3 (15 points)
October: 3–1 (9 points)

Match	Date	Opponent	Sets	Total	Location Attendance	Record	Pts	Report
1	October 10, 2026	Capital1	3–2	105–95	SM Seaside Cebu Arena; 12,105	1–0	2	P2
2	October 15, 2026	Zus Coffee	3–0	75–57	Ynares Center Antipolo; 1,469	2–0	5	P2
3	October 22, 2026	Farm Fresh	2–3	112–111	SM Mall of Asia Arena; 1,163	2–1	6	P2
4	October 27, 2026	Galeries Tower	3–1	96–76	Ninoy Aquino Stadium; 635	3–1	9	P2

November: 2–2 (6 points)

Match	Date	Opponent	Sets	Total	Location Attendance	Record	Pts	Report
5	November 3, 2026	Nxled	1–3	88–98	Smart Araneta Coliseum; 1,008	3–2	9	P2
6	November 7, 2026	Akari	2–3	104–107	PhilSports Arena; 2,240	3–3	10	P2
7	November 12, 2026	Creamline	3–2	110–99	Smart Araneta Coliseum; 5,663	4–3	12	P2
8	November 19, 2026	PLDT	3–1	93–93	SM Mall of Asia Arena; 2,340	5–3	15	P2

== Transactions ==
=== Additions ===
Player	Date signed	Previous team	Ref.
Jewel Encarnacion	May 21, 2026	Cignal Super Spikers	
Dawn Macandili-Catindig	May 27, 2026	Cignal Super Spikers	
Ivy Perez	June 24, 2026	Cignal Super Spikers	
Tin Ubaldo	July 6, 2026	FEU Lady Tamaraws (UAAP)	
Lorene Toring	October 6, 2026	Farm Fresh Foxies	

=== Subtractions ===
Player	New team	Ref.
Jem Ferrer	Free agent	
Tia Andaya	Free agent	
