= 2024–25 Choco Mucho Flying Titans season =

Fifth season of the Choco Mucho Flying Titans

The 2024–25 Choco Mucho Flying Titans season was the fifth season of the Choco Mucho Flying Titans in the Premier Volleyball League (PVL).

In the preliminary round of the All-Filipino Conference, the team had a middling start by going 2–3 in their first three matches. They then went on a six-match winning streak to end the prelims, finishing fifth with an 8–3 record and 20 points. In the qualifying round, the Flying Titans beat the Chery Tiggo Crossovers to earn an outright berth to the final round. In the quarterfinals, the team swept the PLDT High Speed Hitters in the best-of-three series to advance to the round-robin semifinals. Unfortunately, Choco Mucho lost all three matches, only gaining one point during the round. They were then matched against the Akari Chargers in the bronze medal series. After trailing 0–1, the Flying Titans tied the series in the second match. The team, however, wasn't able to close out the series in the end, losing to Akari in straight sets, and finishing the conference in fourth place.

== Roster ==
Choco Mucho Flying Titans
No.	Player	Position	Height (m)	Birth date	School
1	(Philippines) Isa Molde	OH	1.70 m (5 ft 7 in)	October 18, 1998 (age 28)	University of the Philippines
2	(Philippines) Desiree Cheng	OH	1.73 m (5 ft 8 in)	September 28, 1996 (age 30)	De La Salle University
3	(Philippines) Deanna Wong	S	1.73 m (5 ft 8 in)	July 18, 1998 (age 28)	Ateneo De Manila University
4	(Philippines) Mean Mendrez	OH	1.78 m (5 ft 10 in)	November 14, 1998 (age 27)	University of the East
5	(Philippines) Bia General	L	1.65 m (5 ft 5 in)	August 27, 1995 (age 31)	National University
6	(Philippines) Dindin Santiago-Manabat	OPP/MB	1.88 m (6 ft 2 in)	September 26, 1993 (age 33)	National University
7	(Philippines) Maddie Madayag	MB	1.80 m (5 ft 11 in)	February 7, 1998 (age 28)	Ateneo De Manila University
8	(Philippines) Maika Ortiz	MB	1.78 m (5 ft 10 in)	August 30, 1991 (age 35)	University of Santo Tomas
9	(Philippines) Marionne Alba	S	1.68 m (5 ft 6 in)	August 26, 1999 (age 27)	De La Salle University
10	(Philippines) (Canada) Katrina Tolentino	OP	1.85 m (6 ft 1 in)	January 27, 1995 (age 31)	Ateneo De Manila University
11	(Philippines) (Nigeria) Aduke Ogunsanya	MB	1.80 m (5 ft 11 in)	October 2, 1996 (aged 27)	De La Salle University
12	(Philippines) Jamenea Ferrer	S	1.57 m (5 ft 2 in)	December 12, 1991 (age 34)	Ateneo de Manila University
14	(Philippines) Lutgarda Malaluan	MB	1.80 m (5 ft 11 in)	January 16, 1993 (age 33)	FAITH
15	(Philippines) Royse Tubino	OH	1.75 m (5 ft 9 in)	January 12, 1993 (age 33)	University of Perpetual Help System DALTA
16	(Philippines) Thang Ponce	L	1.57 m (5 ft 2 in)	October 21, 1998 (age 28)	Adamson University
17	(Philippines) Lorraine Pecaña	MB	1.81 m (5 ft 11 in)	April 21, 2001 (age 25)	Arellano University
18	(Philippines) Sisi Rondina (C)	OH	1.68 m (5 ft 6 in)	September 4, 1996 (age 30)	University of Santo Tomas
21	(Philippines) Regine Arocha	OH	1.71 m (5 ft 7 in)	February 21, 1997 (age 29)	Arellano University
22	(Philippines) (United States) Cherry Nunag	MB	1.80 m (5 ft 11 in)	October 22, 1992 (age 34)	De La Salle University-Dasmariñas

Coaching staff

- Head coach:
  (Philippines) Dante Alinsunurin
- Assistant coaches:
  (Philippines) Edjet Mabbayad (C)
  (Philippines) Jessie Lopez
- Strength & conditioning coach:
  (Philippines) Allan Jovero
- Trainer:
  (Philippines) Jeremiah Barrica

Team Staff

- Team Coordinator:
  (Philippines) Kris Alcantara
- Team Manager:
  (Philippines) Rolando Delfino
- Statistician:
  (Philippines) Jann Paulo Ancheta

Medical Staff

- Physical Therapist:
  (Philippines) Bethel Solano

== 2024 All-Filipino Conference ==
=== Preliminary round ===
==== Standings ====
Pos	Team	Pld	W	L	Pts	SW	SL	SR	SPW	SPL	SPR	Qualification
1	Petro Gazz Angels	11	9	2	28	31	9	3.444	936	779	1.202	Final round
2	Choco Mucho Flying Titans	11	9	2	26	29	11	2.636	921	771	1.195	Final round
3	Chery Tiggo Crossovers	11	9	2	25	28	11	2.545	899	781	1.151	Final round
4	Creamline Cool Smashers	11	8	3	24	27	13	2.077	946	831	1.138	Final round
5	PLDT High Speed Hitters	11	8	3	23	25	12	2.083	859	726	1.183	

Source: TeamPilipinas.info

==== Match log ====
2024 PVL All-Filipino Conference preliminary round match log
Total: 9–2 (26 points)
February: 2–0 (5 points)

Match	Date	Opponent	Sets	Total	Location Attendance	Record	Pts	Report
1	February 22, 2024	Nxled Chameleons	3–0	75–52	Filoil EcoOil Centre; 1,335	1–0	3	P2
2	February 27, 2024	Petro Gazz	3–2	113–105	PhilSports Arena; 1,437	2–0	5	P2

March: 3–1 (10 points)

Match	Date	Opponent	Sets	Total	Location Attendance	Record	Pts	Report
3	March 2, 2024	Chery Tiggo	3–1	95–74	PhilSports Arena; 3,690	3–0	8	P2
4	March 14, 2024	Cignal	3–0	75–59	PhilSports Arena; 2,865	4–0	11	P2
5	March 19, 2024	PLDT	2–3	95–99	Filoil EcoOil Centre; 1,667	4–1	12	P2
6	March 23, 2024	Akari	3–0	75–60	Ynares Center; 3,576	5–1	15	P2

April: 4–1 (11 points)

Match	Date	Opponent	Sets	Total	Location Attendance	Record	Pts	Report
7	April 2, 2024	Galeries Tower	3–0	75–49	PhilSports Arena; 1,021	6–1	18	P2
8	April 6, 2024	Capital1	3–0	75–52	Santa Rosa Sports Complex; 5,444	7–1	21	P2
9	April 13, 2024	Strong Group	3–0	75–47	PhilSports Arena; 3,399	8–1	24	P2
10	April 18, 2024	Creamline Cool Smashers	0–3	58-75	Smart Araneta Coliseum; 17,396	8–2	24	P2
11	April 23, 2024	Farm Fresh	3–2	110–99	PhilSports Arena; 1,113	9–2	26	P2

=== Final round ===
==== Semifinals standings ====
Pos	Team	Pld	W	L	Pts	SW	SL	SR	SPW	SPL	SPR	Qualification
1	Choco Mucho Flying Titans	3	3	0	8	9	3	3.000	274	257	1.066	Championship
2	Creamline Cool Smashers	3	2	1	7	8	4	2.000	285	256	1.113	Championship
3	Petro Gazz Angels	3	1	2	3	5	7	0.714	282	279	1.011	3rd place
4	Chery Tiggo Crossovers	3	0	3	0	1	9	0.111	196	245	0.800	3rd place

Source: TeamPilipinas.info

==== Match log ====
2024 PVL All-Filipino Conference final round match log
Total: 3–2 (9 points)
Semifinals: 3–0 (8 points)

Match	Date	Opponent	Sets	Total	Location Attendance	Record	Pts	Report
1	April 30, 2024	Creamline	3–2	100–107	PhilSports Arena; 5,294	1–0	2	P2
2	May 2, 2024	Chery Tiggo	3–0	75–62	PhilSports Arena; 5,221	2–0	5	P2
3	May 5, 2024	Petro Gazz	3–1	99–88	Smart Araneta Coliseum; 17,834	3–0	8	P2

Championship: 0–2 (1 points)

Match	Date	Opponent	Sets	Total	Location Attendance	Series	Report
1	May 9, 2024	Creamline	1–3	83–99	Smart Araneta Coliseum; 17,457	0–1	P2
2	May 12, 2024	Creamline	2–3	103–107	Smart Araneta Coliseum; 23,162	0–2	P2

== Draft ==
Round	Pick	Player	Position	School
1	11	Lorraine Pecaña	MB	Arellano

The Akari Chargers selected Lorraine Pecaña with the 11th pick before passing during the second round.

== Reinforced Conference ==
=== Preliminary round ===
==== Standings ====
Pos	Team	Pld	W	L	Pts	SW	SL	SR	SPW	SPL	SPR	Qualification
7	Capital1 Solar Spikers	8	5	3	13	17	15	1.133	688	677	1.016	Quarterfinals
8	Farm Fresh Foxies	8	3	5	8	11	17	0.647	575	576	0.998	Quarterfinals
9	Choco Mucho Flying Titans	8	2	6	7	11	21	0.524	661	693	0.954	
10	Nxled Chameleons	8	1	7	3	6	23	0.261	510	609	0.837	
11	Galeries Tower Highrisers	8	0	8	4	11	24	0.458	728	842	0.865	

Source: Premier Volleyball League

==== Match log ====
2024 PVL Reinforced Conference preliminary round match log
Total: 2–6 (7 points)
July: 1–2 (4 points)

Match	Date	Opponent	Sets	Total	Location Attendance	Record	Pts	Report
1	July 18, 2024	Cignal	0–3	75–55	PhilSports Arena; 2,236	0–1	0	P2
2	July 23, 2024	Akari	2–3	107–99	PhilSports Arena; 1,212	0–2	1	P2
3	July 27, 2024	Zus Coffee	3–1	89–82	PhilSports Arena; 1,843	1–2	4	P2

August: 1–4 (3 points)

Match	Date	Opponent	Sets	Total	Location Attendance	Record	Pts	Report
4	August 1, 2024	Capital1	2–3	104–96	PhilSports Arena; 1,138	1–3	5	P2
5	August 6, 2024	Petro Gazz	0–3	57–75	PhilSports Arena; 1,394	1–4	5	P2
6	August 13, 2024	Chery Tiggo	3–2	107–89	PhilSports Arena; 1,069	2–4	7	P2
7	August 17, 2024	Creamline	0–3	64–81	SM Mall of Asia; 9,429	2–5	7	P2
8	August 22, 2024	PLDT	1–3	78–96	Filoil EcoOil Centre; 1,415	2–6	7	P2

== 2024–25 All-Filipino Conference ==
=== Preliminary round ===
==== Standings ====
Pos	Team	Pld	W	L	Pts	SW	SL	SR	SPW	SPL	SPR	Qualification
3	Cignal HD Spikers	11	8	3	25	27	12	2.250	909	794	1.145	Qualifying round
4	PLDT High Speed Hitters	11	8	3	23	27	13	2.077	927	842	1.101	Qualifying round
5	Choco Mucho Flying Titans	11	8	3	20	27	20	1.350	1064	1031	1.032	Qualifying round
6	Farm Fresh Foxies	11	5	6	15	18	22	0.818	847	915	0.926	Qualifying round
7	Akari Chargers	11	5	6	15	16	22	0.727	844	868	0.972	Qualifying round

Source: Premier Volleyball League

==== Match log ====
2024–25 PVL All-Filipino Conference preliminary round match log
Total: 8–3 (20 points)
November: 2–2 (5 points)

Match	Date	Opponent	Sets	Total	Location Attendance	Record	Pts	Report
1	November 9, 2024	Petro Gazz	1–3	85–101	PhilSports Arena; 3,065	0–1	0	P2
2	November 14, 2024	Galeries Tower	3–2	109–105	Filoil EcoOil Centre; 590	1–1	2	P2
3	November 21, 2024	Capital1	3–1	102–81	Filoil EcoOil Centre; 1,258	2–1	5	P2
4	November 28, 2024	Cignal	1–3	83–95	PhilSports Arena; 1,409	2–2	5	P2

December: 1–1 (2 points)

Match	Date	Opponent	Sets	Total	Location Attendance	Record	Pts	Report
5	December 3, 2024	Creamline	1–3	94–105	Smart Araneta Coliseum; 9,551	2–3	5	P2
6	December 12, 2025	Farm Fresh	3–2	111–105	PhilSports Arena; 3,071	3–3	7	P2

January: 2–0 (5 points)

Match	Date	Opponent	Sets	Total	Location Attendance	Record	Pts	Report
7	January 18, 2025	Zus Coffee	3–2	105–103	PhilSports Arena; 2,875	4–3	9	P2
8	January 23, 2025	PLDT	3–1	96–83	PhilSports Arena; 1,482	5–3	12	P2

February: 3–0 (8 points)

Match	Date	Opponent	Sets	Total	Location Attendance	Record	Pts	Report
9	February 8, 2025	Akari	3–1	94–84	PhilSports Arena; 3,088	6–3	15	P2
10	February 13, 2025	Nxled	3–2	109–104	Ninoy Aquino Stadium; 872	7–3	17	P2
11	February 22, 2025	Chery Tiggo	3–0	76–65	City of Passi Arena; 2,997	8–3	20	P2

=== Qualifying round ===
==== Match log ====
2024–25 PVL All-Filipino Conference qualifying round match log
Total: 1–0 (3 points)
Qualifying round: 1–0 (3 points)

Date	Opponent	Sets	Total	Location Attendance	Report
March 1, 2025	Chery Tiggo	3–0	57–75	PhilSports Arena; 2,952	P2

=== Final round ===
==== Bracket ====
Quarterfinals
1	Creamline	2
8	Chery Tiggo	0
2	Petro Gazz	2
7	Zus Coffee	1
3	Galeries Tower	0
6	Akari	2
4	PLDT	0
5	Choco Mucho	2

Semifinals
Creamline	6
Petro Gazz	9
Choco Mucho	1
Akari	2

Finals
Championship
Creamline	1
Petro Gazz	2
Third-place
Choco Mucho	1
Akari	2

===== Semifinals standings =====
Pos	Team	Pld	W	L	Pts	SW	SL	SR	SPW	SPL	SPR	Qualification
1	Petro Gazz Angels	3	3	0	9	9	2	4.500	272	232	1.172	Championship
2	Creamline Cool Smashers	3	2	1	6	7	3	2.333	236	201	1.174	Championship
3	Akari Chargers	3	1	2	2	3	8	0.375	224	256	0.875	3rd place
4	Choco Mucho Flying Titans	3	0	3	1	3	9	0.333	241	284	0.849	3rd place

Source: Premier Volleyball League

==== Match log ====
2024–25 PVL All-Filipino Conference final round match log
Total: 3–5 (9 points)
Quarterfinals: 2–0 (4 points)

Match	Date	Opponent	Sets	Total	Location Attendance	Series	Report
1	March 15, 2025	PLDT	3–2	107–101	PhilSports Arena; 3,408	1–0	P2
2	March 20, 2025	PLDT	3–2	98–101	PhilSports Arena; 2,443	2–0	P2

Semifinals: 0–3 (1 point)

Match	Date	Opponent	Sets	Total	Location Attendance	Record	Pts	Report
1	March 29, 2025	Akari	2–3	106–108	Ynares Center Antipolo; 5,915	0–1	1	P2
2	April 1, 2025	Petro Gazz	1–3	86–101	PhilSports Arena; 7,485	0–2	1	P2
3	April 3, 2025	Creamline	0–3	49–75	Smart Araneta Coliseum; 7,347	0–3	1	P2

Third-place series: 1–2 (4 points)

Match	Date	Opponent	Sets	Total	Location Attendance	Series	Report
1	April 8, 2025	Akari	2–3	95–110	Smart Araneta Coliseum; 5,526	0–1	P2
2	April 10, 2025	Akari	3–1	102–88	Smart Araneta Coliseum; 6,457	1–1	P2
3	April 12, 2025	Akari	0–3	63–77	PhilSports Arena; 4,931	1–2	P2

== Transactions ==
=== Additions ===
Player	Date signed	Previous team	Ref.
Mars Alba	January 8, 2024	F2 Logistics Cargo Movers	
Bia General	January 8, 2024	Cignal HD Spikers	
Mean Mendrez	January 8, 2024	PLDT High Speed Hitters	
Dindin Santiago-Manabat	June 20, 2024	Akari Chargers	
Lutgarda Malaluan	July 5, 2024	PLDT High Speed Hitters	
Lorraine Pecaña	July 9, 2024	Arellano Lady Chiefs (NCAA)	

=== Subtractions ===
Player	New team	Ref.
Caitlin Viray	Farm Fresh Foxies	

=== Foreign guest player ===
Team	Foreign player	Moving from	Ref.
Choco Mucho Flying Titans	(Greece) Zoi Faki	(Greece) Apollon Kalamatas	
