= List of Premier Volleyball League conference results =

The Premier Volleyball League (PVL) hosts three conferences each season, with the exception of 2021, which only had one due to the COVID-19 pandemic. The following is the results of each conference, showing where each team ranked in that conference.

== Results by conference ==
Season	Conference	1st	2nd	3rd	4th	5th	6th	7th	8th	9th	10th	11th	12th	13th
2017	Reinforced	Pocari	BaliPure	Creamline	PSM	Perlas	Air Force	—N/a						
2017	Open	BaliPure	Pocari	Creamline	PAF	Perlas	UP	PSM	AdU	—N/a				
2017	Collegiate	NU	FEU	AU	AdU	UP	ADMU	SBU	SSC-R	LPU	CSB	TIP	JRU	—N/a
2018	Reinforced	Creamline	PayMaya	Perlas	Pocari; Air Force	Petro; Gazz	BaliPure	Iriga	Tacloban	—N/a				
2018	Collegiate	UP	FEU	AdU	UST	CSB	SBU	UPHSD	SSC-R	—N/a				
2018	Open	Creamline	ADMU	BanKo; Perlas	Petro; Gazz	Pocari; Air Force	Tacloban	Iriga–Navy	AdU	—N/a				
2019	Reinforced	Petro; Gazz	Creamline	Pacific Town; Army	BanKo Perlas	Motolite	BaliPure	—N/a						
2019	Open	Creamline	Petro; Gazz	BanKo; Perlas	Motolite	Air Force	Pacific Town; Army	Choco; Mucho	BaliPure	Chef's; Classics	—N/a			
2019	Collegiate	AdU	UST	ADMU	CSB	FEU	SBU	AU	UPHSD	CSJL	LPU	SSC-R	TIP	—N/a
2021	Open	Chery; Tiggo	Creamline	Petro; Gazz	Choco; Mucho	Sta. Lucia	Army Black; Mamba	PLDT	BaliPure	Perlas	Cignal	—N/a		
2022	Open	Creamline	Petro; Gazz	Cignal	Choco; Mucho	PLDT	F2; Logistics	Army Black; Mamba	Chery; Tiggo	BaliPure	—N/a			
2022	Invitational	Creamline	KingWhale	Cignal	PLDT	Army Black; Mamba	Petro; Gazz	Choco; Mucho	Chery; Tiggo	—N/a				
2022	Reinforced	Petro; Gazz	Cignal	Creamline	Chery; Tiggo	F2; Logistics	PLDT	Choco; Mucho	Akari	UA-Army	—N/a			
2023	1st All-Filipino	Creamline	Petro; Gazz	F2; Logistics	PLDT	Chery; Tiggo	Cignal	Choco; Mucho	Akari	Army Black; Mamba	—N/a			
2023	Invitational	Kurashiki	Creamline	Cignal	F2; Logistics	PLDT	Kinh Bắc; Bắc Ninh	Choco Mucho	Chery; Tiggo	Petro; Gazz	Akari	Foton	Gerflor	Farm; Fresh
2023	2nd All-Filipino	Creamline	Choco; Mucho	Cignal	Chery; Tiggo	PLDT	Petro; Gazz	Akari	F2; Logistics	Nxled	Farm; Fresh	Galeries; Tower	Gerflor	—N/a
2024–25	2024 All-Filipino	Creamline	Choco; Mucho	Petro; Gazz	Chery; Tiggo	PLDT	Cignal	Akari	Nxled	Farm; Fresh	Galeries; Tower	Capital1	Strong Group	—N/a
2024–25	Reinforced	Creamline	Akari	Cignal	PLDT	Chery; Tiggo	Petro; Gazz	Capital1	Farm; Fresh	Choco; Mucho	Nxled	Galeries; Tower	Zus; Coffee	—N/a
2024–25	Invitational	Creamline	Cignal	Kurashiki	Est Cola	Farm; Fresh	—N/a							
2024–25	2024–25 All-Filipino	Petro; Gazz	Creamline	Akari	Choco; Mucho	PLDT	Chery; Tiggo	Zus; Coffee	Galeries; Tower	Cignal	Farm; Fresh	Capital1	Nxled	—N/a
2025–26	PVL on Tour	PLDT	Chery; Tiggo	Creamline	Cignal	Nxled	Farm; Fresh	Zus; Coffee	Akari	Petro; Gazz	Choco; Mucho	Capital1	Galeries; Tower	—N/a
2025–26	Invitational	PLDT	Kobe; Shinwa	Creamline	Chery; Tiggo	Cignal	Zus; Coffee	—N/a						
2025–26	Reinforced	Petro; Gazz	Zus; Coffee	Akari	PLDT	Farm; Fresh	Creamline	Cignal	Capital1	Choco; Mucho	Chery; Tiggo	Nxled	Galeries; Tower	—N/a
2025–26	All-Filipino	Creamline	Cignal	PLDT	Farm; Fresh	Nxled	Akari	Choco; Mucho	Galeries; Tower	Capital1	Zus; Coffee	—N/a		
2026–27	Invitational	Est Cola	Nxled	PLDT	Creamline	Farm; Fresh	Ho Chi; Minh City	—N/a						

== Results by team ==
=== Key ===
Key
C	Conference champion	#	Reached semifinals in conference
2	Conference runner-up	#	Reached quarterfinals in conference
3	Placed third in conference	#	Participated in conference
4	Placed fourth in conference		Did not participate in conference
Number (#) indicates ranking in the conference

==== Commercial teams ====
Team	2017		2018		2019		2021	2022			2023			2024–25				2025–26				2026–27
Team	R	O	R	O	R	O	O	O	I	R	1F	I	2F	'24 F	R	I	'25 F	T	I	R	F	I
Active teams
Akari										8	8	10	7	7	2		3	8		3	6	
Capital1														11	7		11	11		8	9	
Choco Mucho						7	4	4	7	7	7	7	2	2	9		4	10		9	7	
Creamline	3	3	C	C	2	C	2	C	C	3	C	2	C	C	C	C	2	3	3	6	C	4
Farm Fresh												13	10	9	8	5	10	6		5	4	5
Galeries Tower													11	10	11		8	12		12	8	
Nxled													9	8	10		12	5		11	5	2
PLDT							7	5	4	6	4	5	5	5	4		5	C	C	4	3	3
Zus Coffee														12	12		7	7	6	2	10	
Former teams
BaliPure	2	C	6		6	8	8	9														
Chef's Classics						9																
Chery Tiggo							C	8	8	4	5	8	4	4	5		6	2	4	10		
Cignal							10	3	3	2	6	3	3	6	3	2	9	4	5	7	2	
F2 Logistics								6		5	3	4	8									
Foton												11										
Gerflor												12	12									
Iriga City Oragons			7	7																		
Motolite					5	4																
PayMaya			2																			
Perlas Spikers	5	5	3	3	4	3	9															
Petro Gazz			5	4	C	2	3	2	6	C	2	9	6	3	6		C	9		C		
Philippine Air Force	6		(Note: The Philippine Air Force Jet Spikers partnered with the Pocari Sweat Lady Warriors during the 2018 season.)			5																
Philippine Army					3	6	6	7	5	9	9											
Pocari Sweat	C	2	4	5																		
Power Smashers	4	7																				
Sta. Lucia							5															
Tacloban Fighting Warays			8	6																		

==== Collegiate teams ====
Team	2017	2018	2019
Adamson	4	3	C
Arellano	3		7
Ateneo	6		3
Benilde	10	5	4
FEU	2	2	5
JRU	12		
Letran			9
Lyceum	9		10
NU	C		
Perpetual		7	8
San Beda	7	6	6
San Sebastian	8	8	11
TIP	11		12
UP	5	C	
UST		4	2

== All-time standings ==
Statistics as of the 2024 Premier Volleyball League season

Team	Conf.	Pld.	W	L	Pts.	SP	SW	SL	SR	SPW	SPL	SPR	W%
Akari Chargers	6	54	26	28	73	204	96	108	0.889	4368	4532	0964	48.15%
BaliPure Purest Water Defenders	7	81	31	50	91	310	125	185	0.676	6423	7030	0.914	38.27%
Capital1 Solar Spikers	2	20	6	14	18	73	24	49	0.490	1434	1669	0.859	30.00%
Chef's Classics Lady Red Spikers	1	16	0	16	2	54	6	48	0.125	991	1322	0.750	0.00%
Chery Tiggo Crossovers	9	94	49	45	147	354	185	169	1.095	7706	7619	1.011	52.13%
Choco Mucho Flying Titans	10	107	56	51	170	408	215	193	1.114	8961	8710	1.029	52.34%
Cignal HD Spikers	10	104	61	43	180	388	213	175	1.217	8753	8391	1.043	58.65%
Creamline Cool Smashers	16	210	174	36	516	790	571	219	2.607	18573	15807	1.175	82.86%
F2 Logistics Cargo Movers	5	48	24	24	69	178	89	89	1.000	3930	3926	1.001	50.00%
Farm Fresh Foxies	5	36	8	28	26	142	41	101	0.406	2949	3308	0.891	22.22%
Foton Tornadoes	1	6	2	4	5	22	7	15	0.467	445	531	0.838	33.33%
Galeries Tower Highrisers	3	30	4	26	15	110	28	82	0.341	2121	2599	0.816	13.33%
Gerflor Defenders	2	16	0	16	2	53	5	48	0.104	891	1287	0.692	0.00%
Iriga City Oragons	2	26	5	21	15	94	25	69	0.362	1930	2241	0.861	19.23%
Motolite Power Builders	2	30	14	16	37	110	49	61	0.803	2380	2414	0.986	46.67%
Nxled Chameleons	3	30	9	21	26	103	34	69	0.493	2155	2371	0.909	30.00%
PayMaya Highflyers	1	12	7	5	19	47	25	22	1.136	1039	1033	1.006	58.33%
Perlas Spikers	7	100	50	50	151	391	196	195	1.005	8527	8574	0.995	50.00%
Petro Gazz Angels	13	162	100	62	308	600	364	236	1.542	13686	12629	1.084	61.73%
Philippine Air Force Lady Jet Spikers	2	41	16	25	50	154	66	88	0.750	3278	3443	0.952	39.02%
Philippine Army Lady Troopers	7	72	21	51	72	270	101	169	0.598	5635	6173	0.913	29.17%
PLDT High Speed Hitters	9	88	48	39	147	327	182	145	1.255	7276	6904	1.054	55.17%
Pocari Sweat Lady Warriors	4	62	36	26	103	247	133	114	1.167	5372	5353	1.004	58.06%
Power Smashers	2	22	8	14	26	90	39	51	0.765	1918	2010	0.954	36.36%
Sta. Lucia Lady Realtors	1	9	5	4	14	32	17	15	1.133	716	663	1.080	55.56%
Tacloban Fighting Warays	2	26	10	16	28	99	40	59	0.678	2087	2201	0.948	38.46%
Zus Coffee Thunderbelles	2	19	0	19	0	60	3	57	0.053	1055	1501	0.703	0.00%

== See also ==
- List of Shakey's V-League conference results
- List of Spikers' Turf conference results
- List of V-League (Philippines) conference results
