= Choco Mucho–Creamline rivalry =

Filipino volleyball rivalry

- Teams: Choco Mucho Flying Titans; Creamline Cool Smashers
- First meeting: August 31, 2019; Creamline 3–1 Choco Mucho
- Latest meeting: November 12, 2026; Choco Mucho 3–2 Creamline
- Next meeting: November 24, 2026

Statistics
- Total meetings: 21
- All-time series: 19–2 (CCS)
- Longest win streak: CCS W12
- Current win streak: CMF W1

Finals history
- 2023 PVL 2nd AFC: Creamline won, 2–0; 2024 PVL AFC: Creamline won, 2–0

The Choco Mucho–Creamline rivalry is a Premier Volleyball League (PVL) sister team rivalry between the Choco Mucho Flying Titans and Creamline Cool Smashers. Both teams are owned by Rebisco, hence it is also given the name "Rebisco Clasico". The rivalry is among the most popular in the league, attracting large crowds. Game 2 of the 2023 Second All-Filipino Conference championship series drew a record attendance of 24,459 at the Smart Araneta Coliseum, the highest turnout for a Philippine volleyball game. Multiple journalists have also described the two teams as among the most popular in the entire league.

Despite the popularity of both teams and their rivalry, the rivalry itself is very lopsided. As of November 2026, Creamline won 19 out of 21 matches as well as winning both championship series against Choco Mucho.

== History ==
=== Background ===
The concept of "sister teams", teams owned by the same company or under the same umbrella, aren't relatively new in Philippine sports. The Philippine Basketball Association has three teams owned by San Miguel Corporation and another three owned by the Manuel V. Pangilinan group, the former of which includes the Manila Clasico rivalry between the Barangay Ginebra San Miguel and Magnolia Hotshots.

Rebisco's first volleyball team, the Creamline Cool Smashers, joined the Premier Volleyball League in 2017 while its second team, the Choco Mucho Flying Titans, was established two years later in 2019, forming the league's first sister teams.

=== 2022: Large crowd turnouts ===
In the 2022 Open Conference saw both Rebisco teams meet in the final round for the first time, with them meeting in the semifinals. On April 3, 2022, with the country easing from the COVID-19 pandemic, the second games of the semifinals drew a crowd of 16,687. The first game of the doubleheader saw Creamline complete a two-game sweep of Choco Mucho to advance to the finals. The large attendance turnout would continue throughout the year, with the teams' matches in the succeeding Invitational and Reinforced conferences recording attendances of 15,237 and 19,117, respectively, with the latter surpassing the aforementioned 2022 Open Conference record.

=== 2023–2024: Championship clashes and a new attendance record ===
In the 2023 Second All-Filipino Conference, the two teams met in the championship for the first time. On December 16, 2023, game 2 of the championship saw a crowd of 24,459 watch as Creamline complete a two-game sweep of Choco Mucho to win their seventh league title. The game broke the Philippine volleyball attendance record previously set in the UAAP Season 78 women's volleyball finals in 2016, which featured rivals Ateneo and La Salle. Players and coaches on both sides expressed their gratitude towards the record crowd as well as mentioning the overall growth of volleyball in the country.

On April 30, 2024, at the start of the All-Filipino Conference semifinals, Choco Mucho would finally get their first victory over Creamline in their thirteenth match-up. This preceded their championship rematch which saw another Creamline sweep with them winning their eighth league title and second against Choco Mucho.

== Records by season and conference ==
| Season | Season series | Conference | Conference series | Overall series |
|---|---|---|---|---|
| 2019 | Creamline, 2–0 | Open | Creamline, 2–0 | Creamline, 2–0 |
| 2021 | Creamline, 1–0 | Open | Creamline, 1–0 | Creamline, 3–0 |
| 2022 | Creamline, 4–0 | Open | Creamline, 2–0 | Creamline, 7–0 |
| 2022 | Creamline, 4–0 | Invitational | Creamline, 1–0 | Creamline, 7–0 |
| 2022 | Creamline, 4–0 | Reinforced | Creamline, 1–0 | Creamline, 7–0 |
| 2023 | Creamline, 4–0 | First All-Filipino | Creamline, 1–0 | Creamline, 11–0 |
| 2023 | Creamline, 4–0 | Second All-Filipino | Creamline, 3–0 | Creamline, 11–0 |
| 2024–25 | Creamline, 6–1 | 2024 All-Filipino | Creamline, 3–1 | Creamline, 17–1 |
| 2024–25 | Creamline, 6–1 | Reinforced | Creamline, 1–0 | Creamline, 17–1 |
| 2024–25 | Creamline, 6–1 | 2024–25 All-Filipino | Creamline, 2–0 | Creamline, 17–1 |
| 2025–26 | Creamline, 2–0 | Reinforced | Creamline, 1–0 | Creamline, 19–1 |
| 2025–26 | Creamline, 2–0 | All-Filipino | Creamline, 1–0 | Creamline, 19–1 |
| 2026–27 | Choco Mucho, 1–0 | All-Filipino | Choco Mucho, 1–0 | Creamline, 19–2 |

== Head-to-head records ==
| Season | Conference | Stage | Date | | Score | | Set 1 | Set 2 | Set 3 | Set 4 | Set 5 | Total |
|---|---|---|---|---|---|---|---|---|---|---|---|---|
| 2019 | Open | Preliminary round | August 31, 2019 | Creamline | 3–1 | Choco Mucho | 25–12 | 25–22 | 19–25 | 25–18 | | 94–77 |
| 2019 | Open | Preliminary round | October 5, 2019 | Creamline | 3–0 | Choco Mucho | 25–15 | 25–16 | 25–18 | | | 75–49 |
| 2021 | Open | Preliminary round | August 4, 2021 | Creamline | 3–2 | Choco Mucho | 18–25 | 25–9 | 21–25 | 25–18 | 15–6 | 104–83 |
| 2022 | Open | Semifinals | April 1, 2022 | Creamline | 3–1 | Choco Mucho | 25–18 | 17–25 | 25–19 | 25–11 | | 92–73 |
| 2022 | Open | Semifinals | April 3, 2022 | Choco Mucho | 1–3 | Creamline | 25–23 | 19–25 | 18–25 | 15–25 | | 77–98 |
| 2022 | Invitational | Preliminary round | July 23, 2022 | Creamline | 3–0 | Choco Mucho | 25–22 | 25–14 | 25–22 | | | 75–58 |
| 2022 | Reinforced | Preliminary round | November 17, 2022 | Choco Mucho | 1–3 | Creamline | 25–15 | 20–25 | 20–25 | 26–28 | | 91–93 |
| 2023 | First All-Filipino | Preliminary round | February 14, 2023 | Choco Mucho | 0–3 | Creamline | 18–25 | 13–25 | 14–25 | | | 45–75 |
| 2023 | Second All-Filipino | Preliminary round | October 15, 2023 | Choco Mucho | 1–3 | Creamline | 18–25 | 16–25 | 26–24 | 21–25 | | 81–99 |
| 2023 | Second All-Filipino | Championship | December 14, 2023 | Creamline | 3–1 | Choco Mucho | 25–23 | 19–25 | 26–24 | 25–22 | | 95–94 |
| 2023 | Second All-Filipino | Championship | December 16, 2023 | Choco Mucho | 2–3 | Creamline | 25–22 | 20–25 | 27–29 | 26–24 | 12–15 | 110–115 |
| 2024 | All-Filipino | Preliminary round | April 18, 2024 | Creamline | 3–0 | Choco Mucho | 25–17 | 25–22 | 25–19 | | | 75–58 |
| 2024 | All-Filipino | Semifinals | April 30, 2024 | Creamline | 2–3 | Choco Mucho | 25–13 | 25–19 | 21–25 | 20–25 | 16–18 | 107–100 |
| 2024 | All-Filipino | Championship | May 9, 2024 | Creamline | 3–1 | Choco Mucho | 24–26 | 25–20 | 25–21 | 25–16 | | 99–83 |
| 2024 | All-Filipino | Championship | May 12, 2024 | Choco Mucho | 2–3 | Creamline | 25–20 | 20–25 | 25–22 | 22–25 | 11–15 | 103–107 |
| 2024 | Reinforced | Second round | August 17, 2024 | Choco Mucho | 0–3 | Creamline | 16–25 | 19–25 | 29–31 | | | 64–81 |
| 2024–25 | All-Filipino | Preliminary round | December 3, 2024 | Choco Mucho | 1–3 | Creamline | 22–25 | 20–25 | 32–30 | 20–25 | | 94–105 |
| 2024–25 | All-Filipino | Semifinals | April 3, 2025 | Choco Mucho | 0–3 | Creamline | 19–25 | 15–25 | 15–25 | | | 49–75 |
| 2025–26 | Reinforced | Second round | November 13, 2025 | Choco Mucho | 0–3 | Creamline | 17–25 | 17–25 | 23–25 | | | 57–75 |
| 2025–26 | All-Filipino | Preliminary round | February 10, 2026 | Creamline | 3–1 | Choco Mucho | 27–25 | 17–25 | 25–21 | 25–15 | | 94–86 |
| 2026–27 | All-Filipino | Preliminary round | November 12, 2026 | Creamline | 2–3 | Choco Mucho | 25–23 | 13–25 | 23–25 | 25–22 | 13–15 | 99–110 |

== See also ==
- Manila Clasico, another rivalry involving sister teams
