= Motolite Power Builders =

Philippine professional women's volleyball team

- Short name: Motolite
- Nickname: Power Builders
- Founded: 2019
- League: Premier Volleyball League

Uniforms
Home	Away

The Motolite Power Builders were a women's volleyball team in the Philippines. The team competed in the Premier Volleyball League in 2019 and is owned by Philippine Batteries Inc., with the company naming the team after its subsidiary, Motolite Batteries.

Motolite previously sponsored the Ateneo Lady Eagles team during the 2018 Open Conference before establishing this team.

== History ==
Before establishing the Power Builders, Motolite sponsored the Ateneo Lady Eagles Volleyball Team for the 2018 Premier Volleyball League Open Conference with Oliver Almadro taking up coaching duties. In the following 2019 Reinforced Conference, Motolite established its own team, the Power Builders, with a new set of players headed by Myla Pablo.

Motolite decided to take a leave of absence from the PVL for the 2021 season due to the COVID-19 pandemic. As of 2025, the team has yet to make a return.

== Final roster ==
Motolite Power Builders
Number	Player	Position	Height	Birthdate	School
1	(Philippines) (United States) Iris Janelle Tolenada	Setter	1.74 m (5 ft 9 in)	August 21, 1991 (age 34)	San Francisco State University
3	(Philippines) Maristella Genn Layug	Middle blocker	1.80 m (5 ft 11 in)	November 13, 1998 (age 27)	University of the Philippines - Diliman
7	(Philippines) Jellie Tempiatura (L)	Libero	1.57 m (5 ft 2 in)	July 24, 1997 (age 28)	Adamson University
8	(Philippines) Myla Pablo (C)	Outside hitter	1.78 m (5 ft 10 in)	December 9, 1994 (age 31)	National University
9	(Philippines) Jessma Clarice Ramos	Middle blocker	1.72 m (5 ft 8 in)	March 27, 1998 (age 27)	University of the Philippines - Diliman
10	(Philippines) Maria Lina Isabel Molde	Outside hitter	1.70 m (5 ft 7 in)	October 18, 1998 (age 27)	University of the Philippines - Diliman
12	(Philippines) Maria Arielle Estrañero	Service Specialist / Defensive Specialist	1.63 m (5 ft 4 in)	July 22, 1996 (age 29)	University of the Philippines - Diliman
14	(Philippines) Tonnie Rose Ponce (L)	Libero	1.57 m (5 ft 2 in)	October 31, 1998 (age 27)	Adamson University
16	(Philippines) Bernadette Flora	Outside hitter	1.70 m (5 ft 7 in)	August 16, 1998 (age 27)	Adamson University
17	(Philippines) Fenela Risha Emnas	Setter	1.65 m (5 ft 5 in)	August 28, 1994 (age 31)	Adamson University
18	(Philippines) Diana Mae Carlos	Opposite hitter	1.74 m (5 ft 9 in)	July 7, 1998 (age 27)	University of the Philippines - Diliman
19	(Philippines) Aieshalaine Gannaban	Middle blocker	1.74 m (5 ft 9 in)	May 15, 1999 (age 26)	University of the Philippines - Diliman

Technical Staff

Country	Name	Position
(United States)	Airess Star Padda	Head coach
(Philippines)	Maria Angeli Tabaquero	Assistant coach
(Philippines)	Mandy Reyes	Team manager
(Philippines)	Nicole Navarro	Physical Therapist
(Philippines)	Kerr Ucang	Trainer

- C Team Captain
- I Import
- DP Draft Pick
- R Rookie
- IN Inactive
- S Suspended
- FA Free Agent
- Injured

== Honors ==
=== Team ===
Season	Conference	Title	Source
2018	Reinforced	did not compete	
2018	Open	Runner-up	
2019	Reinforced	5th place	
2019	Open	4th place	

=== Individual ===
Season	Conference	Award	Name
2018	Open Conference	1st Best Middle Blocker	Maddie Madayag
2018	Open Conference	Best Opposite Spiker	Kat Tolentino
2019	Open Conference	Best Opposite Spiker	Diana Mae Carlos

== Transactions ==
2020 PVL Season

2021 Open Conference:

Player	Moving from	Moving to
(Philippines) Maria Carmela Tunay	(Philippines) Petron Blaze Spikers	(Philippines) Motolite
(Philippines) Chlodia Eiriel Ysabella Cortez	(Philippines) Petron Blaze Spikers	(Philippines) Motolite
(Philippines) Melissa Gohing	(Philippines) Creamline Cool Smashers	(Philippines) Motolite
(Philippines) Grazielle Bombita	(Philippines) BaliPure Purest Water Defenders	(Philippines) Motolite
(Philippines) Satriani Espiritu	(Philippines) BaliPure Purest Water Defenders	(Philippines) Motolite
(Philippines) Aieshalaine Gannaban	(Philippines) Motolite	(Philippines) Sta. Lucia Lady Realtors
(Philippines) Maristella Gene Layug	(Philippines) Motolite	(Philippines) Sta. Lucia Lady Realtors
(Philippines) Tonnie Rose Ponce	(Philippines) Motolite	(Philippines) Creamline Cool Smashers

2019 PVL Season

2019 Reinforced Conference:

Player	Moving from	Moving to
(Philippines) Maristella Layug	University of the Philippines	(Philippines) Motolite
(Bosnia and Herzegovina) Edina Selimovic (replaced due to injury)	(Romania) CSU Belor Galati	(Philippines) Motolite
(Trinidad and Tobago) Krystle Esdelle	(Turkey) Pursaklar Belediyesi	(Philippines) Motolite
(Trinidad and Tobago) Channon Thompson	(Germany) Rote Raben Vilsbiburg	(Philippines) Motolite
(Philippines) Jellie Tempiatura	(Philippines) Philippine Air Force Lady Jet Spikers	(Philippines) Motolite
(Philippines) Myla Pablo	(Philippines) Pocari Sweat Lady Warriors	(Philippines) Motolite
(Philippines) Jessma Clarice Ramos	University of the Philippines	(Philippines) Motolite
(Philippines) Maria Lina Isabel Molde	(Philippines) Foton Tornadoes Blue Energy	(Philippines) Motolite
(Philippines) Maria Arielle Estrañero	University of the Philippines	(Philippines) Motolite
(Philippines) Christine Joy Soyud	(Philippines) F2 Logistics Cargo Movers	(Philippines) Motolite
(Philippines) Tonnie Rose Ponce	(Philippines) Adamson University	(Philippines) Motolite
(Philippines) Bernadette Flora	(Philippines) Adamson University	(Philippines) Motolite
(Philippines) Fenela Risha Emnas	(Philippines) BanKo Perlas Spikers	(Philippines) Motolite
(Philippines) Diana Mae Carlos	(Philippines) Foton Tornadoes Blue Energy	(Philippines) Motolite
(Philippines) Aeishalaine Gannaban	University of the Philippines	(Philippines) Motolite

2019 Open Conference:

Player	Moving from	Moving to
(Philippines) (United States) Iris Janelle Tolenada	(Philippines) Pocari Sweat Lady Warriors	(Philippines) Motolite
(Bosnia and Herzegovina) Edina Selimovic (replaced during Reinforced Conference)	(Philippines) Motolite	(Romania) FC Argeș Pitești
(Trinidad and Tobago) Krystle Esdelle	(Philippines) Motolite	(Italy) P2P Smilers Baronissi
(Trinidad and Tobago) Channon Thompson	(Philippines) Motolite	(Germany) Allianz MTV Stuttgart
(Philippines) Christine Joy Soyud	(Philippines) Motolite	(Philippines) Sta. Lucia Lady Realtors

== Team captains ==
- (Philippines) Bea de Leon (2018)
- (Philippines) Myla Pablo (2019)
- (Philippines) Iris Tolenada (2019)

== Imports ==
Season	Number	Player	Country
2019	2	Edina Selimovic (replaced)^{a}	Bosnia and Herzegovina
2019	4	Krystle Esdelle	Trinidad and Tobago
2019	5	Channon Thompson	Trinidad and Tobago

== Coaches ==
- (Philippines) Oliver Almadro (2018 Open)
- (United States) Airess Padda (2019 Reinforced)
- (Kenya) Godfrey Okumu (2019 Open)

== Former players ==
Local players

Philippines

- Deanna Wong
- Vanessa Gandler
- Maddie Madayag
- Pauline Gaston
- Kat Tolentino
- Bea de Leon

Foreign players

Bosnia and Herzegovina

- Edina Selimovic

Trinidad and Tobago

- Channon Thompson
- Krystle Esdelle

== Notes ==
- ^a - Bosnian import Edina Selimovic was replaced by Krystle Esdelle due to an injury.
