= Tia Andaya =

Filipino–American volleyball player (born 2000)

Personal information
- Full name: Tia Joy Andaya
- Nationality: United States (Note: Sporting nationality – not to be confused with citizenship status. Andaya is affiliated with USA Volleyball as per the FIVB Player Database.)
- Born: December 27, 2000 (age 25)
- Home town: Ellensburg, Washington, U.S.
- Education: Gonzaga University; Central Washington University
- Height: 1.75 m (5 ft 9 in)

Volleyball information
- Position: Setter

Career
- Years: Team
- 2023–2024: KV Tirana
- 2024–2025: CSM Lugoj
- 2025–2026: Choco Mucho Flying Titans

Tia Joy Andaya (born December 27, 2000) is a Filipino–American professional volleyball player who last played as a setter for the Choco Mucho Flying Titans of the Premier Volleyball League (PVL).

== Early life and education ==
Hailing from Ellensburg, Washington, Tia Joy Andaya was born to Mario and Molly Andaya on December 27, 2000. She has two brothers. She attended the Ellensburg High School. She studied at Gonzaga University before moving to the Central Washington University. She graduated with a degree in exercise science.

== Career ==
=== High school and college ===
Andaya played as outside hitter and setter for Ellensburg High School's team. She played two years with the Gonzaga Bulldogs before suiting up for the Central Washington Wildcats from 2021 to 2023.

=== Club ===
After college, Andaya signed a contract with KV Tirana in Albania in December 2023. In 2024, Andaya moved to CSM Lugoj in Romania.

Andaya entered the 2025 draft of the Premier Volleyball League (PVL) in the Philippines. She was seventh pick overall and was selected by the Choco Mucho Flying Titans She left the club in June 2026 after playing two conferences for Choco Mucho. She served as a backup setter to Deanna Wong and Alina Bicar.

=== National team ===
Andaya is affiliated with USA Volleyball, but went into the process of changing her sporting nationality to enable her to play for the Philippine national team. She has been included in the Philippine national team pool in March 2025.
