= 2021 Premier Volleyball League season =

Fourth season of the Premier Volleyball League

- League: Premier Volleyball League
- Sport: Volleyball
- Duration: July 17 – August 13, 2021
- TV partners: One Sports; One Sports+; Cignal TV

Conferences
- Open champions: Chery Tiggo Crossovers
- Open runners-up: Creamline Cool Smashers

PVL seasons
- ← 2019 2022 →

The 2021 Premier Volleyball League (PVL) season was the fifth season of the Premier Volleyball League and the first season of the PVL as a professional league. No tournament was held in 2020 due to the COVID-19 pandemic and the 2021 season was staged with precautionary measures. The 2020 season was supposed to be the fourth season.

== Changes ==
=== Professional status ===
The Games and Amusements Board in October 2020 issued a directive that it would consider players compensated for non-national team play would be considered as professionals, as well as that for all sporting events organized for profit as professional in nature. This has raised concerns over the status of semi-professional leagues such as the PVL and its rival league, the PSL. The PVL in particular was concerned over financial aspects of running as a professional league.

In November 2020, the PVL announced that the league would turn professional starting the 2021 season, believing it has enough women players to make the move. The league was already considering to turn professional due to the collegiate league UAAP deciding to bar its rookies from playing in commercial leagues starting its UAAP Season 81 (2018–19), in anticipation that all college players would not be allowed to play in the PVL. Prior to the league's professionalization, the PVL was considered as semi-professional and thus its affairs are not supervised or regulated by GAB Six PVL teams - BaliPure, Banko Perlas, Choco Mucho, Creamline, Motolite and Petro Gazz - agreed with the move for PVL to turn professional.

A new separate league called the V-League, in reference to the PVL's old name, will be formed to accommodate collegiate and amateur teams which could no longer take part in the PVL due to the league's professionalization. Prior to the PVL's professionalization, it has hosted the collegiate conference.

=== Impact of the COVID-19 pandemic ===
Due to the COVID-19 pandemic, the Premier Volleyball League had to secure permit from the Inter-Agency Task Force for the Management of Emerging Infectious Diseases (IATF-EID) of the Philippine national government to host games.

The Open conference, the only tournament of the 2021 season, was held under a "bubble" format with players and staff isolated at the playing venue.

The PVL planned to organize at least two conferences, with the second being the Reinforced Conference which allows teams to field foreign players. It was initially cancelled for the 2021 season by May 2021 due to logistical issues of bringing in foreign players due to pandemic-related travel restrictions as well as to accommodate the Philippine women's national team's preparation and participation in the 2021 Southeast Asian Games and the 2021 Asian Women's Volleyball Championship Both tournaments were later postponed to next year. The conduct of a second conference was again considered after the conclusion of the Open Conference. However such plans were again cancelled.

== Open conference ==
=== Participating teams ===
2021 Premier Volleyball League Open Conference
Abbr.	Team	Affiliation	Head coach	Team captain
BLP	BaliPure Purest Water Defenders	Balibago Waterworks System, Inc.	(Philippines) Rommel Abella	Alina Bicar
BMA	Black Mamba Army Lady Troopers	Philippine Army / Corbridge Group	(Philippines) Kungfu Reyes	Jovelyn Gonzaga
CHD	Cignal HD Spikers	Cignal TV, Inc.	(Philippines) Shaq Delos Santos	Rachel Daquis
CTC	Chery Tiggo Crossovers	United Asia Automotive Group, Inc.	(Philippines) Aaron Vélez	Jaja Santiago
CMF	Choco Mucho Flying Titans	Republic Biscuit Corporation	(Philippines) Oliver Almadro	Maddie Madayag
CCS	Creamline Cool Smashers	Republic Biscuit Corporation	(Thailand) Anusorn Bundit	Alyssa Valdez
PRL	Perlas Spikers	Beach Volleyball Republic / Cosmetique Asia Corporation	(Philippines) Reynaldo Diaz Jr.	Jem Ferrer
PGA	Petro Gazz Angels	PetroGazz Ventures Phils. Corp.	(Philippines) Arnold Laniog	Chie Saet
PLD	PLDT Home Fibr Power Hitters	Philippine Long Distance Telephone Company	(Philippines) Roger Gorayeb	Rhea Dimaculangan
SLR	Sta. Lucia Lady Realtors	Sta. Lucia Realty and Development Corporation	(Philippines) Eddieson Orcullo	Rubie de Leon

=== Ranking ===
Pos	Team	Pld	W	L	Pts	SW	SL	SR	SPW	SPL	SPR	Qualification
1	Creamline Cool Smashers	9	8	1	21	25	11	2.273	837	687	1.218	Semifinals
2	Chery Tiggo Crossovers	9	7	2	23	25	7	3.571	749	608	1.232	Semifinals
3	Choco Mucho Flying Titans	9	7	2	22	23	9	2.556	721	675	1.068	Semifinals
4	Petro Gazz Angels	9	6	3	18	20	11	1.818	736	674	1.092	Semifinals
5	Sta. Lucia Lady Realtors	9	5	4	14	17	15	1.133	716	663	1.080	
6	Black Mamba Army Lady Troopers	9	4	5	13	16	19	0.842	770	781	0.986	
7	PLDT Home Fibr Power Hitters	9	3	6	9	12	18	0.667	614	672	0.914	
8	BaliPure Purest Water Defenders	9	3	6	8	11	22	0.500	656	781	0.840	
9	Perlas Spikers	9	1	8	4	7	25	0.280	636	771	0.825	
10	Cignal HD Spikers	9	1	8	3	6	25	0.240	623	746	0.835	

Source: PhilSports.ph

=== Final round ===
Semifinals
August 8–9
1 Creamline	3	3
4 Petro Gazz	2	0
August 8–10
2 Chery Tiggo	0	3	3
3 Choco Mucho	3	0	0

Championship
August 11–13
Creamline	3	1	2
Chery Tiggo	2	3	3
3rd place match
August 11–12
Petro Gazz	3	3
Choco Mucho	1	0

=== Final standings ===
Rank	Team
1st place, gold medalist(s)	Chery Tiggo Crossovers
2nd place, silver medalist(s)	Creamline Cool Smashers
3rd place, bronze medalist(s)	Petro Gazz Angels
4	Choco Mucho Flying Titans
5	Sta. Lucia Lady Realtors
6	Black Mamba Army Lady Troopers
7	PLDT Home Fibr Power Hitters
8	BaliPure Purest Water Defenders
9	Perlas Spikers
10	Cignal HD Spikers

=== Awards ===
Award	Player	Team	Ref
Conference Most Valuable Player	Jaja Santiago	Chery Tiggo	
Finals Most Valuable Player	Jaja Santiago	Chery Tiggo	
1st Best Outside Spiker	Alyssa Valdez	Creamline	
2nd Best Outside Spiker	Myla Pablo	Petro Gazz	
1st Best Middle Blocker	Ria Meneses	Petro Gazz	
2nd Best Middle Blocker	Jaja Santiago	Chery Tiggo	
Best Opposite Spiker	Kat Tolentino	Choco Mucho	
Best Setter	Jia Morado	Creamline	
Best Libero	Kath Arado	Petro Gazz	

=== Player of the week ===
Week ending	Player	Team	Ref.
July 23	Grazielle Bombita	BaliPure Purest Water Defenders	
July 30	Jovielyn Grace Prado	Sta. Lucia Lady Realtors	
August 7	Jaja Santiago	Chery Tiggo 7 Pro Crossovers	

== Media ==
This is the first season of a three-year deal with Cignal TV, which succeeded ABS-CBN Sports after the network was shutdown. Under the TV5 Network banner, the network had broadcast the rival Philippine Super Liga.
