= Yoko Zetterlund =

American volleyball player

Personal information
- Born: Yoko Karin Zetterlund; March 24, 1969 (age 57); San Francisco, California, U.S.
- Height: 5 ft 11 in (1.80 m)
- Weight: 143 lb (65 kg)
- Spike: 119 in (301 cm)
- Block: 114 in (289 cm)
- Education: Waseda University

Coaching information
- Current team: Ateneo Blue Eagles
Previous teams coached
Years	Teams
2013–2017; 2019–2024; 2024–2026; 2026–present	Kaetsu University; Japan Women’s College; LOVB Atlanta; Ateneo Blue Eagles

Volleyball information
- Position: Setter
- Number: 2

National team
1991–1996	United States
Medal record
Women's volleyball
Representing the United States
Olympic Games
Bronze medal – third place	1992 Barcelona	Team
FIVB World Grand Prix
Gold medal – first place	1995 Shanghai
Goodwill Games
Silver medal – second place	1994 Saint Petersburg	Team
Pan American Games
Silver medal – second place	1995 Mar del Plata	Team

Yoko Karin Zetterlund (born March 24, 1969) is a coach and a former United States national volleyball player and two-time Olympian. She was a setter.

Zetterlund graduated from Waseda University in Tokyo, Japan, and went on to play for the United States national volleyball team. She won a bronze medal at the 1992 Summer Olympics in Barcelona, Spain. She also competed at the 1996 Summer Olympics in Atlanta.

Zetterlund played volleyball for several years in Japan's V.League, leading Daiei to two championships. She retired in 1999.

== Television ==
Since her retirement from volleyball, Zetterlund has appeared as a color commentator and "guest expert" on sports and variety shows in Japan.

== International competitions ==
- 1992 – Summer Olympics (bronze)
- 1992 – FIVB Super Four (bronze)
- 1993 – NORCECA Championships (silver)
- 1993 – FIVB Grand Champions Cup
- 1994 – Goodwill Games (silver)
- 1994 – World Grand Prix
- 1994 – World Championship
- 1995 – Pan American Games (silver)
- 1995 – Canada Cup (gold)
- 1995 – World Grand Prix (gold)
- 1995 – World Cup
- 1996 – Summer Olympics
