= Jema Galanza =

Filipino volleyball player (born 1996)

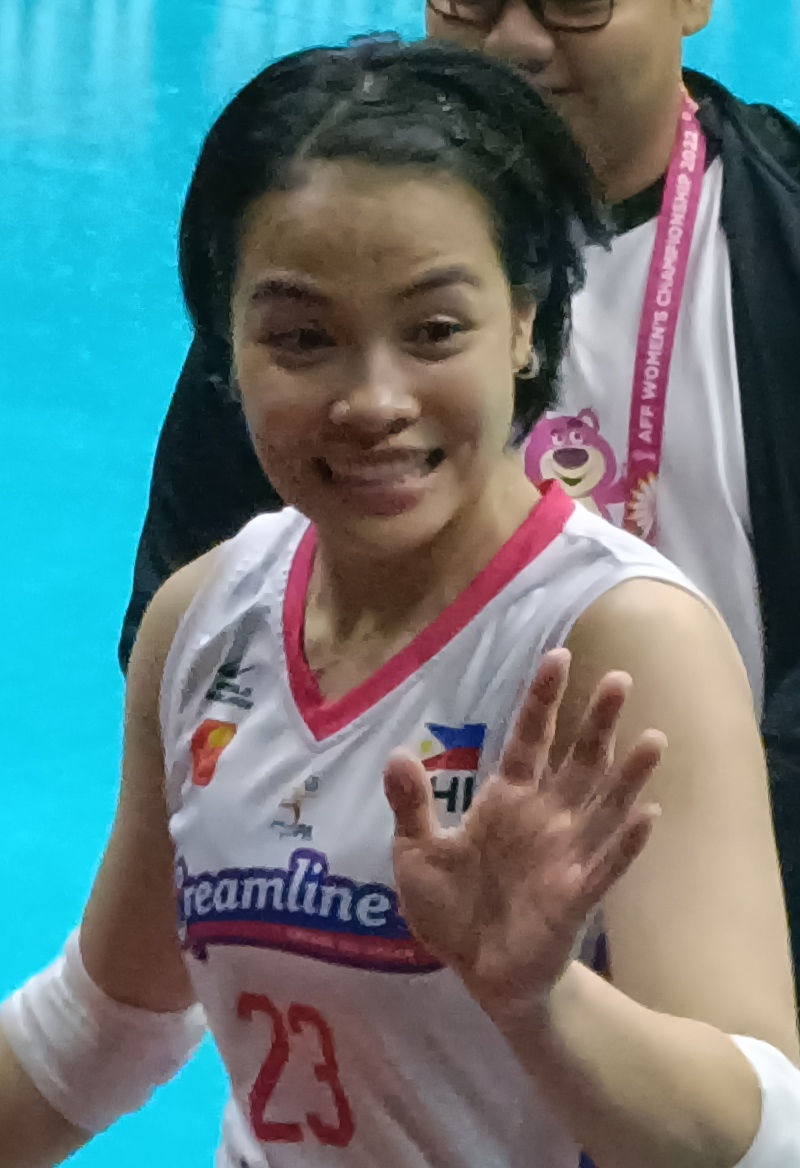
- Galanza in 2025

Personal information
- Full name: Jessica Margarett Casidsid Galanza
- Born: November 28, 1996 (age 29)
- Hometown: San Pedro, Laguna, Philippines
- Height: 5 ft 7 in (1.70 m)
- Weight: 61 kg (134 lb)
- Spike: 250 cm (98 in)
- Block: 248 cm (98 in)
- Education: Adamson University

Volleyball information
- Position: Outside hitter
- Current club: Creamline Cool Smashers
- Number: 15, 23

Career
Years	Teams
2016	Laoag Power Smashers
2017–	Creamline Cool Smashers
2021	Rebisco Philippines

National team
2018–present	Philippines
Honours
Women's volleyball
Representing Philippines
SEA V.League
Bronze medal – third place	2024 Vĩnh Phúc	Leg 1
Bronze medal – third place	2024 Nakhon Ratchasima	Leg 2

Jessica Margarett "Jema" Casidsid Galanza (born November 28, 1996) is a Filipino professional volleyball player who is an outside hitter for the Creamline Cool Smashers of the Premier Volleyball League (PVL). She was the former captain of the Adamson Lady Falcons volleyball team in the UAAP and a Philippines national team player. She also played for the Laoag Power Smashers during the 2016 SVL Reinforced Conference. Galanza has become the second-leading spiker for Creamline in the PVL. She has six Best Outside Hitter honors while Alyssa Valdez seven, making Galanza the second-winningest player in that position.

== Personal life ==
Galanza was born and raised in San Pedro, Laguna, Philippines to Jesse and Fe Galanza. She went to San Pedro Relocation Center National High School, San Pedro, Laguna and earned her bachelor's degree at Adamson University. She has three siblings and her youngest sister, Maria Fe "Mafe" Galanza, played for the University of Santo Tomas' Golden Tigresses.

Galanza was previously in a relationship with former Ateneo Lady Eagles and Choco Mucho Flying Titans player Deanna Wong. She is currently in a relationship with former Ateneo Lady Eagles and fellow Creamline Cool Smashers player Ella de Jesus.

== Career ==
In 2013, Galanza debuted as a reserve player of Adamson University in the beach volleyball tournament. She teamed up with star players Bang Pineda and Amanda Villanueva, and they completed a two-game championship sweep of the UAAP Season 76 women's beach volleyball tournament against University of Santo Tomas.

During her collegiate years, she played with the Adamson Lady Falcons and was the team captain in UAAP Season 80. Galanza is playing for the Creamline Cool Smashers in Premier Volleyball League along with Alyssa Valdez, Jia Morado, Michele Gumabao, and Tots Carlos.

In 2018, Galanza played for the Philippine women's volleyball team that competed in the 2018 Asian Women's Volleyball Cup held at Nakhon Ratchasima, Thailand. During the 2018 Premier Volleyball League Open Conference, Galanza received the 2nd best outside spiker award and together with the Creamline Cool Smashers, eventually won the championship.

During the 2019 Premier Volleyball League Open Conference, she bagged the 1st Best Outside Spiker and Most Valuable Player of the Conference awards and won the third PVL championship title of her current team Creamline Cool Smashers.

In 2021, Galanza was invited to the training pool of the Philippine national volleyball team who would compete in the 2021 Asian Women's Club Volleyball Championship in Thailand from October 1 to 07, 2021.

In 2022, Galanza was again called up in the final line-up of the Philippine national volleyball team and was set for her first SEA games appearance in Hanoi, Vietnam in May 2022. At the Asian Women's Volleyball Championship later that year, she topscored with 21 points in the first win of the host Philippines over Iran. Galanza also scored 18 points in the last two sets of their win in the AVC Cup classification match against Australia.

Galanza and eventual MVP Tots Carlos led the Creamline Cool Smashers in winning the 2022 Premier Volleyball League Invitational Conference at the expense of KingWhale Taipei.

Galanza also topscored for the Creamline Cool Smashers in Game 3 of the All-Filipino Conference Finals against the Petro Gazz Angels on March 30, 2023.

In 2024, Galanza won her fifth Best Spiker award and earned the coveted Finals MVP plum after leading the Cool Smashers to their 4-peat and 8th title overall in the pro league. Earlier in the year, she and her fellow Adamson University alumna Ana Santiago received their PSC–PCW Women in Sports Awards.

Galanza did not play in the 2025 Premier Volleyball League Reinforced Conference due to a foot injury.

== Awards ==
=== Individual ===
- 2015 16th National Intercollegiate Volleyball “Best Attacker”
- 2018 Premier Volleyball League Open Conference "2nd Best Outside Spiker"
- 2019 Premier Volleyball League Open Conference "1st Best Outside Spiker"
- 2019 Premier Volleyball League Open Conference "Most valuable player"
- 2023 Premier Volleyball League All-Filipino Conference "1st Best Outside Spiker"
- 2023 Premier Volleyball League Second All-Filipino Conference "2nd Best Outside Spiker"
- 2024 PSC–PCW Women in Sports Awards
- 2024 Premier Volleyball League All-Filipino Conference "2nd Best Outside Spiker"
- 2024 Premier Volleyball League All-Filipino Conference "Finals Most Valuable Player"
- 2025 Premier Volleyball League Invitational Conference "1st Best Outside Spiker"

=== Collegiate ===
- 2014 UAAP Season 76 Beach Volleyball – Champion, with Adamson Soaring Lady Falcons
- 2014 Shakey's V-League 11th Season 1st Conference – Bronze medal, with Adamson Soaring Lady Falcons
- 2014 UNIGAMES Women's Volleyball – Bronze medal, with Adamson Soaring Lady Falcons
- 2015 UNIGAMES Women's Volleyball – Silver medal, with Adamson Soaring Lady Falcons

=== Club Team ===
- 2017 Premier Volleyball League Reinforced Conference – third place, with Creamline Cool Smashers
- 2018 Premier Volleyball League Reinforced Conference – champion, with Creamline Cool Smashers
- 2018 Premier Volleyball League Open Conference – champion, with Creamline Cool Smashers
- 2019 Premier Volleyball League Reinforced Conference – runner-up, with Creamline Cool Smashers
- 2019 Premier Volleyball League Open Conference – champion, with Creamline Cool Smashers
- 2021 Premier Volleyball League Open Conference – runner-Up, with Creamline Cool Smashers
- 2022 Premier Volleyball League Open Conference – champion, with Creamline Cool Smashers
- 2022 Premier Volleyball League Invitational Conference – champion, with Creamline Cool Smashers
- 2022 Premier Volleyball League Reinforced Conference – Bronze medal, with Creamline Cool Smashers
- 2023 Premier Volleyball League All-Filipino Conference – champion, with Creamline Cool Smashers
- 2023 Premier Volleyball League Invitational Conference – Runner-up with Creamline Cool Smashers
- 2023 Premier Volleyball League Second All-Filipino Conference – champion, with Creamline Cool Smashers
- 2024 Premier Volleyball League All-Filipino Conference – Champion, with Creamline Cool Smashers
- 2024 Premier Volleyball League Reinforced Conference – Champion, with Creamline Cool Smashers
- 2024 Premier Volleyball League Invitational Conference – Champion, with Creamline Cool Smashers
- 2024–25 Premier Volleyball League All-Filipino Conference - Runner-up with Creamline Cool Smashers
- 2025 Premier Volleyball League on Tour – Bronze medal, with Creamline Cool Smashers
- 2025 Premier Volleyball League Invitational Conference – Bronze medal, with Creamline Cool Smashers
- 2026 Premier Volleyball League All-Filipino Conference – Champion, with Creamline Cool Smashers
