= 2022 Premier Volleyball League season =

Fifth season of the Premier Volleyball League

- League: Premier Volleyball League
- Sport: Volleyball
- Duration: March 16 – December 6, 2022
- TV partners: Cignal TV; One Sports

Conferences
- Open champions: Creamline
- Open runners-up: Petro Gazz
- Invitational champions: Creamline
- Invitational runners-up: KingWhale
- Reinforced champions: Petro Gazz
- Reinforced runners-up: Cignal

PVL seasons
- ← 2021 2023 →

The 2022 Premier Volleyball League (PVL) season was the sixth season of the Premier Volleyball League that started on March 16, 2022, with the 2022 Open Conference. This is the second year of PVL as a professional league that held three conferences in one season after a lone conference last year due to the COVID-19 pandemic.

== Open conference ==
The 2022 Premier Volleyball League Open Conference was the eleventh conference of the Premier Volleyball League, its second conference as a professional league, and the first conference of the 2022 season.

The conference was held from March 16 to April 8, 2022, pending restrictions brought by the COVID-19 pandemic. A pool play format was adapted for the first time, wherein teams were divided into two pools, as opposed to a round-robin format where all teams play against each other at least once. The preliminary round was held at the Paco Arena in Manila. The quarterfinal round and semifinals games 1 & 3 were held at the San Juan Arena in San Juan. The semifinals game 2 and finals game 1 were held at SM Mall of Asia Arena in Pasay, while the finals game 2 was held at Ynares Center in Antipolo, Rizal.

=== Participating teams ===
2022 Premier Volleyball League Open Conference
Abbr.	Team	Affiliation	Head coach	Team captain
ABM	Army Black Mamba Lady Troopers	Philippine Army / Corbridge Group	Kungfu Reyes	Royse Tubino
BLP	BaliPure Purest Water Defenders	Balibago Waterworks System, Inc.	Rommel Abella	Alina Bicar
CTC	Chery Tiggo 7 Pro Crossovers	United Asia Automotive Group, Inc.	Aaron Vélez	Jasmine Nabor
CMF	Choco Mucho Flying Titans	Republic Biscuit Corporation	Oliver Almadro	Bea De Leon
CHD	Cignal HD Spikers	Cignal TV, Inc.	Shaq Delos Santos	Rachel Daquis
CCS	Creamline Cool Smashers	Republic Biscuit Corporation	Sherwin Meneses	Alyssa Valdez
FTL	F2 Logistics Cargo Movers	F2 Logistics Philippines	Benson Bocboc	Aby Maraño
PGA	Petro Gazz Angels	PetroGazz Ventures Phils. Corp.	Jerry Yee	Chie Saet
PLD	PLDT High Speed Hitters	PLDT Inc.	George Pascua	Rhea Dimaculangan

=== Venues ===
Preliminaries	Quarterfinals, classification, semifinals
City of Manila	San Juan City
Paco Arena	Filoil EcoOil Centre
Capacity: 1,000	Capacity: 6,000
Classification, semifinals, finals	Semifinals, finals
Pasay City	Antipolo
SM Mall of Asia Arena	Ynares Center
Capacity: 15,000	Capacity: 7,400

=== Preliminary round ===
==== Pool A ====
Pos	Team	Pld	W	L	Pts	SW	SL	SR	SPW	SPL	SPR	Qualification
1	Cignal HD Spikers	4	4	0	12	12	4	3.000	381	324	1.176	Quarterfinals with twice to beat advantage
2	Choco Mucho Flying Titans	4	3	1	8	10	6	1.667	353	339	1.041	Quarterfinals with twice to beat advantage
3	F2 Logistics Cargo Movers	4	2	2	6	8	7	1.143	342	334	1.024	Quarterfinals
4	Chery Tiggo Crossovers	4	1	3	4	6	9	0.667	327	331	0.988	Quarterfinals
5	Army Black Mamba Lady Troopers	4	0	4	0	2	12	0.167	266	341	0.780	Classification round

Source: PhilSports.ph

==== Pool B ====
Pos	Team	Pld	W	L	Pts	SW	SL	SR	SPW	SPL	SPR	Qualification
1	Creamline Cool Smashers	3	3	0	8	9	2	4.500	261	207	1.261	Quarterfinals with twice to beat advantage
2	Petro Gazz Angels	3	2	1	7	8	5	1.600	294	278	1.058	Quarterfinals with twice to beat advantage
3	PLDT High Speed Hitters	3	1	2	3	4	6	0.667	219	235	0.932	Quarterfinals
4	BaliPure Purest Water Defenders	3	0	3	0	1	9	0.111	195	249	0.783	Quarterfinals

Source: PhilSports.ph

=== Final round ===
Quarterfinals
March 28
A1 Cignal	3
B4 BaliPure	0
March 29
B2 Petro Gazz	3
A3 F2 Logistics	1
March 28
B1 Creamline	3
A4 Chery Tiggo	1
March 29
A2 Choco Mucho	3
B3 PLDT	2

Semifinals
April 1–4
Cignal	3	2	1
Petro Gazz	0	3	3
April 1–3
Creamline	3	3
Choco Mucho	1	1

Championship
April 6–8
Petro Gazz	0	0
Creamline	3	3
Third place
April 6–8
Cignal	1	3	1.02
Choco Mucho	3	1	0.98

=== Final standings ===
Rank	Team
1st place, gold medalist(s)	Creamline Cool Smashers
2nd place, silver medalist(s)	Petro Gazz Angels
3rd place, bronze medalist(s)	Cignal HD Spikers
4	Choco Mucho Flying Titans
5	PLDT High Speed Hitters
6	F2 Logistics Cargo Movers
7	Army Black Mamba Lady Troopers
8	Chery Tiggo 7 Pro Crossovers
9	BaliPure Purest Water Defenders

=== Awards ===
Award	Player	Team	Ref
Conference Most Valuable Player	Tots Carlos	Creamline	
Finals Most Valuable Player	Alyssa Valdez	Creamline	
1st Best Outside Spiker	Frances Molina	Cignal	
2nd Best Outside Spiker	Grethcel Soltones	Petro Gazz	
1st Best Middle Blocker	Roselyn Doria	Cignal	
2nd Best Middle Blocker	Ria Meneses	Cignal	
Best Opposite Spiker	Tots Carlos	Creamline	
Best Setter	Gel Cayuna	Cignal	
Best Libero	Dawn Macandili	F2 Logistics	

== Invitational conference ==
The 2022 Premier Volleyball League Invitational Conference was the twelfth conference of the Premier Volleyball League, its third conference as a professional league, and the second conference of the 2022 season.

The tournament began on July 9, 2022. Originally slated for the July 2, the tournament was pushed back due to the requests of the club teams.

This is the first (the second for the former SVL) conference of the league to commence an invitational conference. A total of eight teams will compete in this event, including one international team — KingWhale Taipei from Taiwan. The BaliPure Purest Water Defenders and F2 Logistics begged off from joining the conference. A second guest team, Kobe Shinwa University, was supposed to join the semi-final round but backed out at the last minute. Replacement guest Philippine National Team, composed mostly of NU Lady Bulldogs team members, also backed out.

=== Participating teams ===
2022 Premier Volleyball League Invitational Conference
Abbr.	Team	Affiliation	Head coach	Team captain
Local teams
ABM	Army Black Mamba Lady Troopers	Philippine Army / Corbridge Group	(Philippines) Kungfu Reyes	(Philippines) Jovelyn Gonzaga
CTC	Chery Tiggo 7 Pro Crossovers	United Asia Automotive Group, Inc.	(Philippines) Clarence Esteban	(Philippines) Maika Ortiz
CMF	Choco Mucho Flying Titans	Republic Biscuit Corporation	(Philippines) Oliver Almadro	(Philippines) Bea de Leon
CHD	Cignal HD Spikers	Cignal TV, Inc.	(Philippines) Shaq Delos Santos	(Philippines) Rachel Daquis
CCS	Creamline Cool Smashers	Republic Biscuit Corporation	(Philippines) Sherwin Meneses	(Philippines) Alyssa Valdez
PGA	Petro Gazz Angels	PetroGazz Ventures Phils. Corp.	(Philippines) Arnold Laniog	(Philippines) Chie Saet
PLD	PLDT High Speed Hitters	PLDT Inc.	(Philippines) George Pascua	(Philippines) Rhea Dimaculangan
Foreign guest team
KWT	KingWhale Taipei	Enterprise Volleyball League	(Chinese Taipei) Teng Yen-Min	(Chinese Taipei) Liao Yi-Jen

=== Venues ===
Preliminaries	Preliminaries, semifinals
Santa Rosa City	San Juan City
Santa Rosa Sports Complex	Filoil EcoOil Centre
Capacity: 5,700	Capacity: 6,000
Semifinals	Preliminaries, semifinals, finals
Antipolo	Pasay City
Ynares Center	SM Mall of Asia Arena
Capacity: 7,400	Capacity: 15,000

=== Preliminary round ===
Pos	Team	Pld	W	L	Pts	SW	SL	SR	SPW	SPL	SPR	Qualification
1	Creamline Cool Smashers	6	5	1	15	16	5	3.200	514	439	1.171	Final round
2	PLDT High Speed Hitters	6	4	2	12	14	10	1.400	533	487	1.094	Final round
3	Cignal HD Spikers	6	4	2	11	14	10	1.400	531	520	1.021	Final round
4	Army Black Mamba Lady Troopers	6	3	3	9	11	11	1.000	483	504	0.958	Final round
5	Petro Gazz Angels	6	2	4	7	10	13	0.769	507	517	0.981	
6	Choco Mucho Flying Titans	6	2	4	6	9	14	0.643	483	526	0.918	
7	Chery Tiggo 7 Pro Crossovers	6	1	5	3	4	15	0.267	398	456	0.873	

=== Semifinals ===
Pos	Team	Pld	W	L	Pts	SW	SL	SR	SPW	SPL	SPR	Qualification
1	KingWhale Taipei	4	4	0	10	12	5	2.400	381	351	1.085	Championship match
2	Creamline Cool Smashers	4	3	1	9	11	6	1.833	378	346	1.092	Championship match
3	PLDT High Speed Hitters	4	2	2	8	10	7	1.429	375	365	1.027	3rd place match
4	Cignal HD Spikers	4	1	3	2	5	11	0.455	335	364	0.920	3rd place match
5	Army Black Mamba Lady Troopers	4	0	4	1	3	12	0.250	318	367	0.866	

=== Finals ===
==== 3rd place match ====
Date	Time	Venue		Score		Set 1	Set 2	Set 3	Set 4	Set 5	Total	Report
14 Aug	14:30	MOA	PLDT High Speed Hitters	2–3	Cignal HD Spikers	25–17	25–20	25–27	22–25	5–15	102–104	P2

==== Championship match ====
Date	Time	Venue		Score		Set 1	Set 2	Set 3	Set 4	Set 5	Total	Report
14 Aug	17:30	MOA	Creamline Cool Smashers	3–0	KingWhale Taipei	25–21	25–19	25–8			75–48	P2

=== Final standings ===
Rank	Team
1st place, gold medalist(s)	Creamline Cool Smashers
2nd place, silver medalist(s)	KingWhale Taipei
3rd place, bronze medalist(s)	Cignal HD Spikers
4	PLDT High Speed Hitters
5	Army Black Mamba Lady Troopers
6	Petro Gazz Angels
7	Choco Mucho Flying Titans
8	Chery Tiggo 7 Pro Crossovers

=== Awards ===
Award	Player	Team	Ref
Conference Most Valuable Player	Tots Carlos	Creamline	
Finals Most Valuable Player	Celine Domingo	Creamline	
1st Best Outside Spiker	Alyssa Valdez	Creamline	
2nd Best Outside Spiker	Frances Molina	Cignal	
1st Best Middle Blocker	Mika Reyes	PLDT	
2nd Best Middle Blocker	Dell Palomata	PLDT	
Best Opposite Spiker	Tots Carlos	Creamline	
Best Setter	Liao Yi-Jen	KingWhale Taipei	
Best Libero	Qiu Shi-Qing	KingWhale Taipei	

== Reinforced conference ==
The 2022 Premier Volleyball League Reinforced Conference was the thirteenth conference of the Premier Volleyball League, its fourth conference as a professional league, and the third and final conference of the 2022 season.

The tournament began on October 8 and finished on December 6, 2022. This was the first reinforced conference in three years; the last was in 2019. It was also the first conference to use a video challenge system. It featured nine local teams with one foreign guest player each. Among these were the returning F2 Logistics Cargo Movers and the debuting team Akari Chargers.

=== Participating teams ===
2022 Premier Volleyball League Reinforced Conference
Abbr.	Team	Affiliation	Head coach	Foreign guest player	Team captain
AKA	Akari Chargers	Akari Lighting & Technology Corporation	(Brazil) Jorge Edson	(Dominican Republic) Prisilla Rivera	(Philippines) Michelle Cobb
CTC	Chery Tiggo Crossovers	United Asia Automotive Group, Inc.	(Philippines) Clarence Esteban	(Montenegro) Jelena Cvijović	(Philippines) Mylene Paat
CMF	Choco Mucho Flying Titans	Republic Biscuit Corporation	(Philippines) Edjet Mabbayad	(Azerbaijan) Odina Aliyeva	(Philippines) Bea de Leon
CHD	Cignal HD Spikers	Cignal TV, Inc.	(Philippines) Shaq Delos Santos	(United States) Tai Bierria	(Philippines) Rachel Anne Daquis
CCS	Creamline Cool Smashers	Republic Biscuit Corporation	(Philippines) Sherwin Meneses	(Turkey) Yeliz Başa	(Philippines) Alyssa Valdez
FTL	F2 Logistics Cargo Movers	F2 Logistics Philippines	(Philippines) Benson Bocboc	(United States) Lindsay Stalzer	(United States) Lindsay Stalzer
PGA	Petro Gazz Angels	PetroGazz Ventures Phils. Corp.	(Philippines) Rald Ricafort	(United States) Lindsey Vander Weide	(Philippines) Chie Saet
PLD	PLDT High Speed Hitters	PLDT Inc.	(Philippines) George Pascua	(Russia) Elena Savkina-Samoilenko	(Philippines) Rhea Dimaculangan
UAA	United Auctioneers Army Lady Troopers	Philippine Army / United Auctioneers Inc.	(Philippines) Kungfu Reyes	(Canada) Laura Condotta	(Philippines) Jovelyn Gonzaga

=== Venues ===
Preliminaries
Santa Rosa City	San Juan City	Pasay City
Santa Rosa Sports Complex	Filoil EcoOil Centre	SM Mall of Asia Arena
Capacity: 5,700	Capacity: 6,000	Capacity: 15,000
Preliminaries, semifinals, finals
Quezon City	Pasig City	
Araneta Coliseum	PhilSports Arena	
Capacity: 20,000	Capacity: 10,000	

=== Preliminary round ===
Pos	Team	Pld	W	L	Pts	SW	SL	SR	SPW	SPL	SPR	Qualification
1	Creamline Cool Smashers	8	7	1	22	23	10	2.300	782	700	1.117	Semifinals
2	Chery Tiggo Crossovers	8	6	2	16	21	14	1.500	764	764	1.000	Semifinals
3	Petro Gazz Angels	8	5	3	15	18	12	1.500	703	617	1.139	Semifinals
4	Cignal HD Spikers	8	5	3	14	18	14	1.286	718	708	1.014	Semifinals
5	F2 Logistics Cargo Movers	8	4	4	11	15	14	1.071	742	709	1.047	
6	PLDT High Speed Hitters	8	3	5	10	15	18	0.833	742	715	1.038	
7	Choco Mucho Flying Titans	8	3	5	9	14	18	0.778	717	723	0.992	
8	Akari Chargers	8	3	5	9	13	18	0.722	637	710	0.897	
9	United Auctioneers Army Lady Troopers	8	0	8	2	5	24	0.208	545	692	0.788	

=== Semifinals ===
Pos	Team	Pld	W	L	Pts	SW	SL	SR	SPW	SPL	SPR	Qualification
1	Cignal HD Spikers	3	2	1	6	7	4	1.750	260	258	1.008	Championship series
2	Petro Gazz Angels	3	2	1	6	6	4	1.500	239	201	1.189	Championship series
3	Creamline Cool Smashers	3	2	1	5	7	5	1.400	266	251	1.060	3rd place series
4	Chery Tiggo Crossovers	3	0	3	1	2	9	0.222	197	252	0.782	3rd place series

=== Finals ===
==== 3rd place ====
- Creamline wins series, 2–0.

Date	Time	Venue		Score		Set 1	Set 2	Set 3	Set 4	Set 5	Total	Report
01 Dec	14:30	SAC	Creamline Cool Smashers	3–1	Chery Tiggo Crossovers	25–22	22–25	25–5	25–19		97–71	P2
06 Dec	14:30	PSA	Chery Tiggo Crossovers	1–3	Creamline Cool Smashers	15–25	19–25	25–23	21–25		80–98	P2

==== Championship ====
- Petro Gazz wins series, 2–0.

Date	Time	Venue		Score		Set 1	Set 2	Set 3	Set 4	Set 5	Total	Report
01 Dec	17:30	SAC	Petro Gazz Angels	3–0	Cignal HD Spikers	25–21	27–25	37–35			89–81	P2
06 Dec	17:30	PSA	Cignal HD Spikers	1–3	Petro Gazz Angels	17–25	25–22	12–25	22–25		76–97	P2

=== Final standings ===
Rank	Team
1st place, gold medalist(s)	Petro Gazz Angels
2nd place, silver medalist(s)	Cignal HD Spikers
3rd place, bronze medalist(s)	Creamline Cool Smashers
4	Chery Tiggo Crossovers
5	F2 Logistics Cargo Movers
6	PLDT High Speed Hitters
7	Choco Mucho Flying Titans
8	Akari Chargers
9	United Auctioneers Army Lady Troopers

=== Awards ===
Award	Player	Team	Ref.
Conference Most Valuable Player	Mylene Paat	Chery Tiggo	
Finals Most Valuable Player	Lindsey Vander Weide	Petro Gazz	
1st Best Outside Spiker	Alyssa Valdez	Creamline	
2nd Best Outside Spiker	Myla Pablo	Petro Gazz	
1st Best Middle Blocker	Mar-Jana Phillips	Petro Gazz	
2nd Best Middle Blocker	Roselyn Doria	Cignal	
Best Opposite Spiker	Mylene Paat	Chery Tiggo	
Best Setter	Jia De Guzman	Creamline	
Best Libero	Ria Beatriz Duremdes	Chery Tiggo	
Best Foreign Guest Player	Lindsey Vander Weide	Petro Gazz	

== Conference results ==
Conference	Champion	Runners-up	3rd	4th	5th	6th	7th	8th	9th
Open	Creamline	Petro Gazz	Cignal	Choco Mucho	PLDT	F2 Logistics	Army Black Mamba	Chery Tiggo	BaliPure
Invitational	Creamline	KingWhale	Cignal	PLDT	Army Black Mamba	Petro Gazz	Choco Mucho	Chery Tiggo	—N/a
Reinforced	Petro Gazz	Cignal	Creamline	Chery Tiggo	F2 Logistics	PLDT	Choco Mucho	Akari	United Auctioneers Army
