= Chef's Classics Lady Red Spikers =

Philippine women's volleyball team

- Full name: Chef's Classics Lady Red Spikers
- Short name: Chef's Classics
- Nickname: Lady Red Spikers
- Founded: 2019
- Dissolved: 2019
- League: Premier Volleyball League (2019)

Uniforms
Home	Away

The Chef's Classics Lady Red Spikers were a women's volleyball team in the Philippines owned by the LJS Group of Companies. The team competed in the Premier Volleyball League (PVL) and only took part in one conference: the 2019 Open Conference.

The team was mostly composed of players from the San Beda Red Lionesses.

== Roster ==
Chef's Classics Lady Red Spikers
Number	Player	Position	Height	Alma mater
1	Rebecca Anjeanette Cuevas	Setter		San Beda
2	Lynne Robyn Matias	Setter	1.60 m (5 ft 3 in)	San Beda
3	Lynsey De Jesus	Outside Hitter		
4	Aljan Andre Pielago	Outside Hitter	1.72 m (5 ft 8 in)	DLSU
5	Julia Andrea Angeles	Libero		Letran
6	Yvette Tongco	Middle Blocker	1.75 m (5 ft 9 in)	EAC
7	Bien Elaine Juanillo	Middle Blocker		Lyceum
8	Maria Nieza Viray	Outside Hitter	1.65 m (5 ft 5 in)	San Beda
10	Noreen Gabriana	Setter	1.70 m (5 ft 7 in)	DLSU
11	Justine Lapid	Outside Hitter		San Beda
12	Maria Cecilia Bangad	Opposite Hitter	1.76 m (5 ft 9 in)	UST
13	Trisha Mae Paras	Middle Blocker	1.74 m (5 ft 9 in)	San Beda
14	Princess Justine Tiu (c)	Outside Hitter	1.75 m (5 ft 9 in)	DLSU
16	Maria Jeziela Viray	Opposite Hitter	1.65 m (5 ft 5 in)	San Beda
18	Mialyn Manabat	Libero	1.65 m (5 ft 5 in)	UE

Coaching staff

- Head Coach: Nemesio Gavino Jr.

Team Staff

- Team Manager:
- Team Trainer:

Medical Staff

- Team Physician:
- Physical Therapist:

== Honors ==
=== Team ===
Season	Conference	Title
2019	Open	9th place

== Coaches ==
- (Philippines) Nemesio Gavino Jr. (2019)

== Team captain ==
- (Philippines) Princess Justine Tiu (2019)
