= Thang Ponce =

Filipina volleyball player

Personal information
- Full name: Tonnie Rose F. Ponce
- Nickname: Thang
- Nationality: Filipino
- Born: October 31, 1996 (age 30)
- Home town: Hermosa, Bataan
- Education: Adamson University
- Height: 1.57 m (5 ft 2 in)
- Weight: 52 kg (115 lb)

Volleyball information
- Position: Libero
- Current club: Choco Mucho Flying Titans
- Number: 16

Career
- Years: Team
- 2016–2019: Adamson Lady Falcons
- 2019–2020: Motolite
- 2020–2022: Perlas Spikers
- 2022–present: Choco Mucho Flying Titans

Tonnie Rose "Thang" T. Ponce (born October 31, 1998) is a Filipino professional volleyball player. She currently plays for the Choco Mucho Flying Titans in the Premier Volleyball League (PVL). She was a member of the Adamson Lady Falcons volleyball team. The pro league PVL awarded her Best Libero in the 2023 All-Filipino Conference and 2018 Collegiate Conference.

== Early life ==
Ponce, who was raised in the town of Hermosa, Bataan, took up college studies at Adamson University and played for the Lady Falcons alongside Jema Galanza in 2017.

== Awards ==
=== Individual ===
- 2018 Premier Volleyball League Collegiate Conference "Best Libero"
- 2023 Premier Volleyball League All-Filipino Conference "Best Libero"
- 2024 Premier Volleyball League All-Filipino Conference "Best Libero"
- 2024-25 Premier Volleyball League All-Filipino Conference "Best Libero"

=== Collegiate ===
- 2018 Premier Volleyball League Collegiate Conference – 2nd runner-up, with Adamson Lady Falcons

=== Club ===
- 2023 Premier Volleyball League All-Filipino Conference – 1st runner-up, with Choco Mucho Flying Titans
- 2024 Premier Volleyball League All-Filipino Conference – 1st Runner-Up, with Choco Mucho Flying Titans
