= Choco Mucho Flying Titans =

Filipino professional women's volleyball team

- 2026–27 Choco Mucho Flying Titans season
- Short name: Choco Mucho
- Nickname: Flying Titans
- Founded: 2019
- History: Choco Mucho Flying Titans; 2019–present
- Head coach: Dante Alinsunurin
- Captain: Desiree Cheng
- League: Premier Volleyball League
- 2026 All-Filipino: 7th place

Uniforms
Home	Away

The Choco Mucho Flying Titans are a Filipino professional women's volleyball team owned by Rebisco. The team competes in the Premier Volleyball League (PVL), where they have played since their establishment in 2019.

The team made the podium twice in the 2023 Second All-Filipino and 2024 All-Filipino conferences. They made finals in both conferences but fell to sister team and perennial rival Creamline Cool Smashers on both occasions.

== History ==
The team was created by Rebisco for the 2019 Premier Volleyball League season acquiring the seniors of the 2019 Ateneo Lady Eagles volleyball team together with their coach, Oliver Almadro who won UAAP Season 81 volleyball tournaments. Madayag, De Leon, Tolentino and Gequiliana were joined by the players of the disbanding United Volleyball Club from the Philippine Super Liga. The team was triumphant for their debut as they swept BaliPure Purest Water Defenders in their first game for the 2019 Premier Volleyball League Open Conference last August 14, 2019. They were seventh, winning 6 games out of 16. The team, led by Madayag, had a 6-game winning streak for the comeback in the 2021 Premier Volleyball League Open Conference. They defeated the PLDT High Speed Hitters, Santa Lucia Realtors, BaliPure Purest Water Defenders, Cignal HD Spikers, Perlas Spikers, and Philippine Army Lady Troopers in the eliminations giving away only two sets. They only lost twice in the eliminations to Creamline Cool Smashers and Chery Tiggo 7 Pro Crossovers, whom they faced off in the Semi-Finals. They ranked fourth in the 2021 Premier Volleyball League Open Conference after losing to Petro Gazz Angels in the battle for bronze.

== Current roster ==
Choco Mucho Flying Titans roster
No.	Nat.	Player	Pos.	Height	DOB	From
1	(Philippines)	Isa Molde	Outside Hitter	1.70 m (5 ft 7 in)	October 18, 1998 (age 28)	UP
2	(Philippines)	Desiree Cheng (C)	Outside Hitter	1.73 m (5 ft 8 in)	September 28, 1996 (age 30)	De La Salle
3	(Philippines)	Deanna Wong	Setter	1.73 m (5 ft 8 in)	July 18, 1998 (age 28)	Ateneo
4	(Philippines)	Mean Mendrez	Outside Hitter	1.78 m (5 ft 10 in)	November 14, 1998 (age 28)	UE
5	(Philippines)	Dawn Macandili-Catindig	Libero	1.53 m (5 ft 0 in)	June 1, 1996 (age 30)	De La Salle
6	(Philippines)	Dindin Santiago-Manabat	Opposite Hitter	1.88 m (6 ft 2 in)	September 26, 1993 (age 33)	National-U
7	(Philippines)	Maddie Madayag	Middle Blocker	1.80 m (5 ft 11 in)	February 7, 1998 (age 28)	Ateneo
8	(Philippines)	Eya Laure	Outside Hitter	1.78 m (5 ft 10 in)	March 21, 1999 (age 27)	UST
9	(Philippines)	Alina Bicar	Setter	1.68 m (5 ft 6 in)	November 17, 1997 (age 28)	UST
10	(Philippines) (Canada)	Kat Tolentino	Opposite Hitter	1.85 m (6 ft 1 in)	January 27, 1995 (age 31)	Ateneo
11	(Philippines)	Ayesha Juegos	Opposite Hitter	1.70 m (5 ft 7 in)	September 14, 2002 (age 24)	Adamson
12	(Philippines)	Tin Ubaldo	Setter	1.72 m (5 ft 8 in)	October 17, 2002 (age 24)	Far Eastern
14	(Philippines)	Jen Villegas	Middle Blocker	1.75 m (5 ft 9 in)	June 20, 2002 (age 24)	Adamson
15	(Philippines)	Jai Atienza	Middle Blocker	1.80 m (5 ft 11 in)	November 9, 1999 (age 27)	UP
16	(Philippines)	Thang Ponce	Libero	1.57 m (5 ft 2 in)	October 21, 1998 (age 28)	Adamson
17	(Philippines)	Lorraine Pecaña	Middle Blocker	1.81 m (5 ft 11 in)	April 21, 2001 (age 25)	Arellano
18	(Philippines)	Sisi Rondina	Outside Hitter	1.68 m (5 ft 6 in)	September 4, 1996 (age 30)	UST
19	(Philippines)	Ivy Jisel Perez	Setter	1.74 m (5 ft 9 in)	February 13, 1995 (age 31)	National-U
20	(Philippines)	Lorene Toring	Middle Blocker	1.83 m (6 ft 0 in)	February 17, 2000 (age 26)	Adamson
21	(Philippines)	Regine Arocha	Libero	1.71 m (5 ft 7 in)	February 21, 1997 (age 29)	Arellano
22	(Philippines)	Jewel Encarnacion	Outside Hitter	1.68 m (5 ft 6 in)	December 22, 2000 (age 25)	UP
24	(Philippines)	Caitlin Viray	Opposite Hitter	1.72 m (5 ft 8 in)	April 12, 1998 (age 28)	UST
Updated as of: October 22, 2026 | Source: PVL.ph

Coaching staff

- Head coach:
  Dante Alinsunurin
- Assistant coaches:
  Edjet Mabbayad
  Jessie Lopez
- Statistician:
  Jann Paulo Ancheta
  Aries Lim
- Strength & conditioning coach:
  Allan Jovero

Team staff

- Team manager:
  Eric Cuatico
- Team coordinator:
  Kris Alcantara

Medical staff

- Physical therapist:
  Bethel Solano

== Rivalries ==
=== Creamline Cool Smashers ===
Although both teams met in the championship twice, Choco Mucho only won two matches all-time against sister team Creamline Cool Smashers. Still, it has become a popular rivalry, with matches between the two attracting large crowds and breaking attendance records.

== Season-by-season records ==
=== Premier Volleyball League ===
Season	Conference	Preliminary round	Final round	Ranking	Source
2019	Open	7th (6–10, 20 pts)	Did not qualify	7th place	
2021 (team)	Open	3rd (7–2, 22 pts)	Lost in semifinals vs. Cherry Tiggo, 1–2; Lost in 3rd-place series vs. Petro Gazz, 0–2	4th place	
2022 (team)	Open	2nd (3–1, 8 pts) (Pool A)	Lost in semifinals vs. Creamline, 2–0; Lost in 3rd-place series vs. Cignal, 1–1 (Note: Choco Mucho lost on aggregate points ratio, 181–185 (0.978 vs. 1.022).)	4th place	
2022 (team)	Invitational	6th (2–4, 6 pts)	Did not qualify	7th place	
2022 (team)	Reinforced	7th (3–5, 9 pts)	Did not qualify	7th place	
2023 (team)	First All-Filipino	7th (2–6, 6 pts)	Did not qualify	7th place	
2023 (team)	Invitational	3rd (3–2, 9 pts) (Pool B)	Did not qualify Won in 7th-place match vs. Chery Tiggo, 3–0*	7th place	
2023 (team)	Second All-Filipino	2nd (10–1, 29 pts)	Lost in championship vs. Creamline, 0–2	Runner-up	
2024–25 (team)	All-Filipino	2nd (9–2, 26 pts)	Lost in championship vs. Creamline, 0–2	Runner-up	
2024–25 (team)	Reinforced	9th (2–6, 7 pts)	Did not qualify	9th place	
2024–25 (team)	Invitational	Did not qualify			
2024–25 (team)	All-Filipino	5th (8–3, 20 pts)	Finished 4th in semifinals Lost in third-place series vs. Akari, 1–2	4th place	
2025–26 (team)	PVL on Tour	5th (1–4, 3 pts) (Pool A)	Lost in knockout round vs. Zus Coffee, 2–3*	10th place	
2025–26 (team)	Invitational	Did not qualify			
2025–26 (team)	Reinforced	9th (3–5, 9 pts)	Did not qualify	9th place	
2025–26 (team)	All-Filipino	7th (4–5, 13 pts)	Lost in Play-in semifinal (Pool B) vs. Akari, 2–3*	7th place	
2026–27 (team)	Invitational	Did not qualify			
An asterisk (*) indicates single match

=== VTV International Women's Volleyball Cup ===
International League	Position	Ref.
2023 VTV International Women's Volleyball Cup	Bronze	

== Individual awards ==
Season	Conference	Award	Name	Ref.
2021	Open	Best Opposite Spiker	Kat Tolentino	
2023	2nd All-Filipino	Most Valuable Player (Conference)	Sisi Rondina	
2023	2nd All-Filipino	Best Libero	Thang Ponce	
2024–25	All-Filipino	1st Best Outside Spiker	Sisi Rondina	
2024–25	All-Filipino	1st Best Middle Blocker	Maddie Madayag	
2024–25	All-Filipino	Best Libero	Thang Ponce	
2025–26	All-Filipino	Best Libero	Thang Ponce	
2025–26	Reinforced	1st Best Middle Blocker	Maddie Madayag	
2025–26	Reinforced	Best Libero	Thang Ponce	

International League	Award	Name	Ref.
2023 VTV International Women's Volleyball Cup	Best Outside Spiker	Sisi Rondina	
2023 VTV International Women's Volleyball Cup	Best Middle Blocker	Maddie Madayag	

== Coaches ==
- (Philippines) Oliver Almadro (2019–2022)
- (Philippines) Edjet Mabbayad (2022 (Note: Interim coach))
- (Philippines) Dante Alinsunurin (2023–present)

== Team captains ==
- (Philippines) Maddie Madayag (2019–2021, 2024)
- (Philippines) Bea de Leon (2022–2023)
- (Philippines) Sisi Rondina (2024-25-2025)
- (Philippines) Desiree Cheng (2025–present)

== Imports ==
Season	Number	Player	Country
2022	5	Odina Aliyeva	Azerbaijan
2024	20	Zoi Faki	Greece
2025	23	Anyse Smith	(United States) USA

== Former players ==
Local players

Philippines

- Aduke Ogunsanya (2022-2025)
- Arianna May Angustia (2019-2021)
- Bang Pineda (2019)
- Bea de Leon (2019-2023)
- Bia General (2024-2025)
- Carla Sandoval (2019)
- Cherry Nunag (2022-2025)
- Cindy Imbo† (2019)
- Dancel Dusaran (2019)
- Denden Lazaro-Revilla (2021-2023)
- Erika Gel Alkuino (2019)
- Gyra Ezra Barroga (2019)
- Honey Royse Tubino (2024-2025)
- Jem Ferrer (2022-2026)
- Jamie Lavitoria (2021)
- Kim Gequillana (2019-2021)
- Luthgarda Malaluan (2024-2025)
- Maika Ortiz (2022-2025)
- Manilla Santos-Ng (2019)
- Mars Alba (2024-2025)
- Mary Grace Berte (2019)
- Mary Grace Masangkay (2019)
- Mary Jane Diane Ticar (2019)
- Necole Ebuen (2021)
- Pauline Gaston (2021-2022)
- Royse Tubino (2024-2025)
- Shannen Palec (2019-2022)
- Tia Andaya (2025-2026)

Foreign players

Azerbaijan

- Odina Aliyeva

Greece

- Zoi Faki

USA

- Marlee Smith

== Draft history ==
Season	Pick No.	Name
2024	11	Lorraine Pecaña
2025	7	Tia Andaya
2025	19	Jen Kylene Villegas
2026	3	Tin Ubaldo
