= 2019 Premier Volleyball League Open Conference =

Second conference of the 2019 PVL season

- Duration: August 11 – November 9, 2019
- Teams: 9
- Matches: 80
- Attendance: 63,788 (797 per match)
- TV partner(s): S+A; Liga

Results
- Champions: Creamline Cool Smashers
- Runners-up: Petro Gazz Angels
- Third place: BanKo Perlas Spikers
- Fourth place: Motolite Power Builders

Awards
- Conference MVP: Jema Galanza
- Finals MVP: Jia Morado
- Best OH: Jema Galanza; Jovielyn Prado
- Best MB: Kathy Bersola; Jeanette Panaga
- Best OPP: Tots Carlos
- Best Setter: Jia Morado
- Best Libero: Kyla Atienza

PVL Open Conference chronology
- < 2018 2021 >

PVL conference chronology
- < 2019 Reinforced 2019 Collegiate >

The 2019 Premier Volleyball League Open Conference was the eighth conference of the Premier Volleyball League and the second conference of the 2019 season. The conference started on August 11, 2019 and ended on November 9, 2019 at the Filoil Flying V Centre, San Juan, Metro Manila, Philippines. Philippine Air Force Women's Volleyball Team returned in action and two new teams joined the conference named Chef's Classics Lady Red Spikers and Choco Mucho Flying Titans (second team of Rebisco).

Teams will play a double-round robin elimination round to determine the final four teams that will advance to the semifinals.

This conference also ran simultaneously with the 2019 Collegiate Conference.

== Participating teams ==
2019 Premier Volleyball League Open Conference
Abbr.	Team	Affiliation	Head coach	Team captain
BLP	BaliPure Purest Water Defenders	Balibago Waterworks System, Inc.	(Philippines) Rommel Abella	Grazielle Bombita
BPS	BanKo Perlas Spikers	Beach Volleyball Republic / BPI Direct BanKo, Inc.	(Thailand) Apichat Kongsawat	Nicole Tiamzon
CCS	Creamline Cool Smashers	Republic Biscuit Corporation	(Thailand) Anusorn Bundit	Alyssa Valdez
MCO	Choco Mucho Flying Titans	Republic Biscuit Corporation	(Philippines) Oliver Almadro	Maddie Madayag
CFC	Chef's Classics Lady Red Spikers	LJS Group of Companies	(Philippines) Nemesio Gavino Jr.	Justine Tiu
MOT	Motolite Power Builders	Philippine Batteries Inc.	(Kenya) Godfrey Okumu	Iris Tolenada
PAF	Philippine Air Force Lady Jet Spikers	Philippine Air Force	(Philippines) Jasper Jimenez	Wendy Semana
PGZ	Petro Gazz Angels	PetroGazz Ventures Phils. Corp.	(Philippines) Arnold Laniog	Chie Saet
PTA	PacificTown-Army Lady Troopers	Philippine Army / PacificTown Property Ventures Inc.	(Philippines) Kungfu Reyes	Ging Balse

== Venues ==
- Filoil Flying V Centre, San Juan (main venue)
- Malolos Sports and Convention Center, Malolos, Bulacan (PVL on tour)
- Iloilo City (PVL on tour)
- University of St. La Salle Coliseum, Bacolod, Negros Occidental (PVL on tour)

== Format ==
Preliminary Round

1. The nine teams will compete in a double round-robin elimination.
2. Teams are ranked using the FIVB Ranking System.
3. Top four teams will advance to the semifinals.

Semifinals

1. Best-of-three series.
2. 1st ranked team vs. 4th ranked team
3. 2nd ranked team vs. 3rd ranked team

Finals

1. Best-of-three series.
2. Bronze medal: SF1 Loser vs. SF2 Loser
3. Gold medal: SF1 Winner vs. SF2 Winner

== Pool standing procedure ==
- First, teams are ranked by the number of matches won.
- If the number of matches won is tied, the tied teams are then ranked by match points, wherein:
  - Match won 3–0 or 3–1: 3 match points for the winner, 0 match points for the loser.
  - Match won 3–2: 2 match points for the winner, 1 match point for the loser.
- In case of any further ties, the following criteria shall be used:
  - Set ratio: the number of sets won divided by number of sets lost.
  - Point ratio: number of points scored divided by number of points allowed.
  - Head-to-head standings: any remaining tied teams are ranked based on the results of head-to-head matches involving the teams in question.

== Preliminary round ==
=== Ranking ===
Pos	Team	Pld	W	L	Pts	SW	SL	SR	SPW	SPL	SPR	Qualification
1	Creamline Cool Smashers	16	16	0	48	48	4	12.000	1291	935	1.381	Semifinals
2	Petro Gazz Angels	16	12	4	35	40	16	2.500	1283	1074	1.195	Semifinals
3	BanKo Perlas Spikers	16	10	6	29	34	24	1.417	1295	1224	1.058	Semifinals
4	Motolite Power Builders	16	10	6	26	32	26	1.231	1290	1237	1.043	Semifinals
5	Philippine Air Force Lady Jet Spikers	16	8	8	25	28	28	1.000	1222	1243	0.983	
6	PacificTown-Army Lady Troopers	16	6	10	21	27	33	0.818	1283	1330	0.965	
7	Choco Mucho Flying Titans	16	6	10	20	28	36	0.778	1379	1378	1.001	
8	BaliPure Purest Water Defenders	16	4	12	10	15	43	0.349	1081	1372	0.788	
9	Chef's Classics Lady Red Spikers	16	0	16	2	6	48	0.125	991	1322	0.750	

- All times are in Philippines Standard Time (UTC+08:00)

Date	Time		Score		Set 1	Set 2	Set 3	Set 4	Set 5	Total	Report
Aug 11	14:00	Philippine Air Force Lady Jet Spikers	0–3	Creamline Cool Smashers	23–25	20–25	15–25			58–75	P–2
Aug 11	16:00	BanKo Perlas Spikers	3–1	Petro Gazz Angels	25–20	11–25	25–21	25–18		86–84	P–2
Aug 14	14:00	BaliPure Purest Water Defenders	0–3	Choco Mucho Flying Titans	12–25	18–25	18–25			48–75	P–2
Aug 14	16:00	Creamline Cool Smashers	3–0	Motolite Power Builders	25–14	25–15	25–14			75–43	P–2
Aug 14	18:00	BanKo Perlas Spikers	1–3	PacificTown-Army Lady Troopers	23–25	23–25	25–17	20–25		91–92	P–2
Aug 17	16:00	Motolite Power Builders	3–0	Chef's Classics Lady Red Spikers	25–22	25–19	25–19			75–60	P–2
Aug 17	18:00	Philippine Air Force Lady Jet Spikers	0–3	BanKo Perlas Spikers	13–25	18–25	19–25			50–75	P–2
Aug 18	16:00	BaliPure Purest Water Defenders	0–3	Petro Gazz Angels	22–25	18–25	16–25			56–75	P–2
Aug 18	18:00	Chef's Classics Lady Red Spikers	0–3	Creamline Cool Smashers	12–25	5–25	15–25			32–75	P–2
Aug 21	14:00	PacificTown-Army Lady Troopers	3–2	Choco Mucho Flying Titans	39–41	19–25	25–19	25–20	15–12	123–117	P–2
Aug 21	16:00	BaliPure Purest Water Defenders	3–2	Philippine Air Force Lady Jet Spikers	26–24	16–25	25–19	17–25	17–15	101–108	P–2
Aug 21	18:00	BanKo Perlas Spikers	1–3	Creamline Cool Smashers	10–25	25–19	17–25	23–25		75–94	P–2
Aug 24	16:00	Chef's Classics Lady Red Spikers	1–3	Choco Mucho Flying Titans	21–25	25–22	14–25	18–25		78–97	P–2
Aug 24	18:00	Creamline Cool Smashers	3–0	Petro Gazz Angels	25–19	28–26	25–20			78–65	P–2
Aug 25	16:00	BaliPure Purest Water Defenders	0–3	Motolite Power Builders	9–25	20–25	19–25			48–75	P–2
Aug 25	18:00	BanKo Perlas Spikers	3–0	Chef's Classics Lady Red Spikers	25–19	25–21	25–16			75–56	P–2P–4
Aug 28	14:00	Motolite Power Builders	3–0	Philippine Air Force Lady Jet Spikers	25–14	25–18	25–23			75–55	P–2
Aug 28	16:00	Petro Gazz Angels	3–0	PacificTown-Army Lady Troopers	25–15	25–15	25–19			75–49	P–2
Aug 28	18:00	Choco Mucho Flying Titans	0–3	BanKo Perlas Spikers	18–25	20–25	23–25			61–75	P–2
Aug 31	16:00	Chef's Classics Lady Red Spikers	1–3	BaliPure Purest Water Defenders	22–25	25–20	25–27	22–25		94–97	P–2
Aug 31	18:00	Creamline Cool Smashers	3–1	Choco Mucho Flying Titans	25–12	25–22	19–25	25–18		94–77	P–2
Sep 01	16:00	PacificTown-Army Lady Troopers	2–3	Motolite Power Builders	16–25	25–22	18–25	25–23	10–15	94–110	P–2
Sep 01	18:00	Petro Gazz Angels	3–0	Philippine Air Force Lady Jet Spikers	25–16	25–20	25–23			75–59	P–2P–4
Sep 04	14:00	Choco Mucho Flying Titans	2–3	Petro Gazz Angels	22–25	15–25	25–19	25–20	3–15	90–104	P–2
Sep 04	16:00	PacificTown-Army Lady Troopers	0–3	Creamline Cool Smashers	23–25	26–28	24–26			73–79	P–2
Sep 04	18:00	BanKo Perlas Spikers	3–2	BaliPure Purest Water Defenders	19–25	25–18	25–21	23–25	15–12	107–101	P–2
Sep 07	16:00	Chef's Classics Lady Red Spikers	0–3	PacificTown-Army Lady Troopers	18–25	18–25	13–25			49–75	P–2
Sep 07	18:00	BaliPure Purest Water Defenders	0–3	Creamline Cool Smashers	8–25	19–25	14–25			41–75	P–2
Sep 08	16:00	Philippine Air Force Lady Jet Spikers	3–0	Chef's Classics Lady Red Spikers	26–24	25–15	25–22			76–61	P–2
Sep 08	18:00	Petro Gazz Angels	3–0	Motolite Power Builders	25–21	25–16	28–26			78–63	P–2
Sep 11	14:00	Choco Mucho Flying Titans	2–3	Philippine Air Force Lady Jet Spikers	24–26	25–14	25–21	22–25	7–15	103–101	P–2
Sep 11	16:00	PacificTown-Army Lady Troopers	3–0	BaliPure Purest Water Defenders	25–17	25–16	27–25			77–58	P–2
Sep 11	18:00	BanKo Perlas Spikers	2–3	Motolite Power Builders	16–25	21–25	25–19	31–29	17–19	110–117	P–2
Sep 14	14:00	Chef's Classics Lady Red Spikers	0–3	Creamline Cool Smashers	11–25	14–25	21–25			46–75	P–2
Sep 14	16:00	Philippine Air Force Lady Jet Spikers	3–0	PacificTown-Army Lady Troopers	25–22	25–21	25–19			75–62	P–2
Sep 15	14:00	Motolite Power Builders	3–2	Choco Mucho Flying Titans	25–27	15–25	25–18	25–17	18–16	108–103	P–2
Sep 15	16:00	BaliPure Purest Water Defenders	1–3	BanKo Perlas Spikers	16–25	12–25	25–16	20–25		73–91	P–2P–4
Sep 18	14:00	PacificTown-Army Lady Troopers	3–0	Chef's Classics Lady Red Spikers	25–11	25–23	25–17			75–51	P–2
Sep 18	16:00	Creamline Cool Smashers	3–0	BaliPure Purest Water Defenders	25–11	25–15	25–17			75–43	P–2
Sep 18	18:00	Motolite Power Builders	0–3	Philippine Air Force Lady Jet Spikers	22–25	23–25	20–25			65–75	P–2
Sep 21	14:00	Chef's Classics Lady Red Spikers	2–3	Choco Mucho Flying Titans	34–32	12–25	25–23	18–25	11–15	100–120	P–2
Sep 21	16:00	BaliPure Purest Water Defenders	0–3	PacificTown-Army Lady Troopers	17–25	22–25	18–25			57–75	P–2
Sep 22	14:00	Philippine Air Force Lady Jet Spikers	3–0	BanKo Perlas Spikers	26–24	25–8	25–21			76–53	P–2
Sep 22	16:00	Chef's Classics Lady Red Spikers	0–3	Petro Gazz Angels	15–25	19–25	18–25			52–75	P–2P–4
Sep 25	14:00	Choco Mucho Flying Titans	3–0	BaliPure Purest Water Defenders	25–16	25–12	25–16			75–44	P–2
Sep 25	16:00	Chef's Classics Lady Red Spikers	0–3	Motolite Power Builders	19–25	23–25	22–25			64–75	P–2
Sep 25	18:00	BanKo Perlas Spikers	0–3	Petro Gazz Angels	18–25	18–25	22–25			58–75	P–2
Sep 28	14:00	Motolite Power Builders	0–3	BanKo Perlas Spikers	21–25	19–25	21–25			61–75	P–2
Sep 28	16:00	BaliPure Purest Water Defenders	3–2	Chef's Classics Lady Red Spikers	25–21	23–25	25–23	17–25	17–15	107–109	P–2
Sep 29	14:00	PacificTown-Army Lady Troopers	2–3	Choco Mucho Flying Titans	20–25	25–17	25–21	11–25	8–15	89–103	P–2
Sep 29	16:00	Creamline Cool Smashers	3–0	Philippine Air Force Lady Jet Spikers	25–15	25–16	25–18			75–49	P–2
Oct 02	14:00	Choco Mucho Flying Titans	3–1	Motolite Power Builders	19–25	25–21	25–15	28–26		97–87	P–2
Oct 02	16:00	Chef's Classics Lady Red Spikers	0–3	Petro Gazz Angels	21–25	14–25	12–25			47–75	P–2
Oct 05	14:00	Petro Gazz Angels	3–2	PacificTown-Army Lady Troopers	25–15	20–25	14–25	25–13	15–7	99–85	P–2
Oct 05	16:00	Creamline Cool Smashers	3–0	Choco Mucho Flying Titans	25–15	25–15	25–16			75–46	P–2
Oct 06	14:00	Philippine Air Force Lady Jet Spikers	2–3	BaliPure Purest Water Defenders	23–25	25–12	29–27	23–25	11–15	111–104	P–2
Oct 06	16:00	Chef's Classics Lady Red Spikers	0–3	BanKo Perlas Spikers	7–25	16–25	17–25			40–75	P–2
Oct 09	16:00	Petro Gazz Angels	2–3	Motolite Power Builders	25–22	13–25	16–25	25–16	11–15	90–103	P–2
Oct 09	18:00	BanKo Perlas Spikers	3–0	Choco Mucho Flying Titans	25–20	25–19	27–25			77–64	P–2
Oct 12	14:00	Motolite Power Builders	3–0	BaliPure Purest Water Defenders	25–16	25–21	25–19			75–56	P–2
Oct 12	16:00	Choco Mucho Flying Titans	1–3	Philippine Air Force Lady Jet Spikers	25–20	18–25	27–29	24–26		94–100	P–2
Oct 13	14:00	PacificTown-Army Lady Troopers	2–3	BanKo Perlas Spikers	27–25	20–25	22–25	25–21	9–15	103–111	P–2
Oct 13	16:00	Petro Gazz Angels	1–3	Creamline Cool Smashers	21–25	24–26	25–19	18–25		88–95	P–2
Oct 16	14:00	Creamline Cool Smashers	3–0	PacificTown-Army Lady Troopers	25–15	25–18	25–22			75–55	P–2
Oct 16	16:00	Philippine Air Force Lady Jet Spikers	0–3	Petro Gazz Angels	20–25	15–25	14–25			49–75	P–2
Oct 19	14:00	PacificTown-Army Lady Troopers	0–3	Motolite Power Builders	21–25	23–25	14–25			58–75	P–2
Oct 19	16:00	Chef's Classics Lady Red Spikers	0–3	Philippine Air Force Lady Jet Spikers	15–25	17–25	20–25			52–75	P–2
Oct 20	14:00	BanKo Perlas Spikers	0–3	Creamline Cool Smashers	22–25	25–27	14–25			61–77	P–2
Oct 20	16:00	Petro Gazz Angels	3–0	BaliPure Purest Water Defenders	25–20	25–11	25–16			75–47	P–2
Oct 23	14:00	Philippine Air Force Lady Jet Spikers	3–1	PacificTown-Army Lady Troopers	28–26	25–20	26–28	26–24		105–98	P–2
Oct 23	16:00	Creamline Cool Smashers	3–1	Motolite Power Builders	25–19	25–22	24–26	25–16		99–83	P–2
Oct 23	18:00	Choco Mucho Flying Titans	0–3	Petro Gazz Angels	18–25	21–25	18–25			57–75	P–2

== Final round ==
- All times are Philippine Standard Time (UTC+8:00).
- All are best-of-three series.

Semifinals
October 26–27
1 Creamline	3	3
4 Motolite	1	0
October 26–27
2 Petro Gazz	3	3
3 BanKo	0	0

Championship
November 6–9
Creamline	3	3
Petro Gazz	0	0
3rd place match
November 6–9
Motolite	0	3	0.750
BanKo	3	1	1.333

=== Semifinals ===
Rank 1 vs rank 4

- Creamline wins series, 2–0

Date	Time		Score		Set 1	Set 2	Set 3	Set 4	Set 5	Total	Report
Oct 26	14:00	Creamline Cool Smashers	3–1	Motolite Power Builders	18–25	25–14	25–21	25–14		93–74	P–2
Oct 27	16:00	Motolite Power Builders	0–3	Creamline Cool Smashers	18–25	15–25	8–25			41–75	P–2

Rank 2 vs rank 3

- Petro Gazz wins series, 2–0

Date	Time		Score		Set 1	Set 2	Set 3	Set 4	Set 5	Total	Report
Oct 26	16:00	Petro Gazz Angels	3–0	BanKo Perlas Spikers	25–22	25–15	25–20			75–57	P–2
Oct 27	14:00	BanKo Perlas Spikers	0–3	Petro Gazz Angels	26–28	17–25	17–25			60–78	P–2

=== Finals ===
3rd place

- BanKo Perlas wins series, 1–1, via sets ratio of 1.33 vs. 0.75

Date	Time		Score		Set 1	Set 2	Set 3	Set 4	Set 5	Total	Report
Nov 06	16:00	BanKo Perlas Spikers	3–0	Motolite Power Builders	25–23	25–23	25–18			75–64	P–2
Nov 09	16:00	Motolite Power Builders	3–1	BanKo Perlas Spikers	26–28	25–14	25–19	25–17		101–78	P–2

Championships

- Creamline wins series, 2–0

Date	Time		Score		Set 1	Set 2	Set 3	Set 4	Set 5	Total	Report
Nov 06	18:00	Creamline Cool Smashers	3–0	Petro Gazz Angels	25–14	25–22	27–25			77–61	P–2
Nov 09	18:00	Petro Gazz Angels	0–3	Creamline Cool Smashers	27–29	22–25	25–27			74–81	P–2

== Awards ==
Award	Player	Team	Ref.
Conference Most Valuable Player	Jema Galanza	Creamline	
Finals Most Valuable Player	Jia Morado	Creamline	
1st Best Outside Spiker	Jema Galanza	Creamline	
2nd Best Outside Spiker	Jovielyn Grace Prado	Petro Gazz	
1st Best Middle Blocker	Kathy Bersola	BanKo Perlas	
2nd Best Middle Blocker	Jeanette Panaga	Petro Gazz	
Best Opposite Spiker	Tots Carlos	Motolite	
Best Setter	Jia Morado	Creamline	
Best Libero	Kyla Atienza	Creamline	

== Final standings ==
Rank	Team
1st place, gold medalist(s)	Creamline Cool Smashers
2nd place, silver medalist(s)	Petro Gazz Angels
3rd place, bronze medalist(s)	BanKo Perlas Spikers
4	Motolite Power Builders
5	Philippine Air Force Lady Jet Spikers
6	PacificTown-Army Lady Troopers
7	Choco Mucho Flying Titans
8	BaliPure Purest Water Defenders
9	Chef's Classics Lady Red Spikers

2019 PVL Open champions

3rd title

Team Roster
Alyssa Valdez (C), Kyle Negrito, Coleen Bravo, Heather Anne Guino-o, Risa Sato, Michele Gumabao, Pau Soriano, Kyla Atienza (L), Jia Morado, Rizza Mandapat, Jema Galanza, Rosemarie Vargas, Melissa Gohing (L), Fille Cayetano
Head coach
Anusorn "Tai" Bundit

== See also ==
- 2019 Spikers’ Turf Open Conference
