= Alina Bicar =

Filipino volleyball player

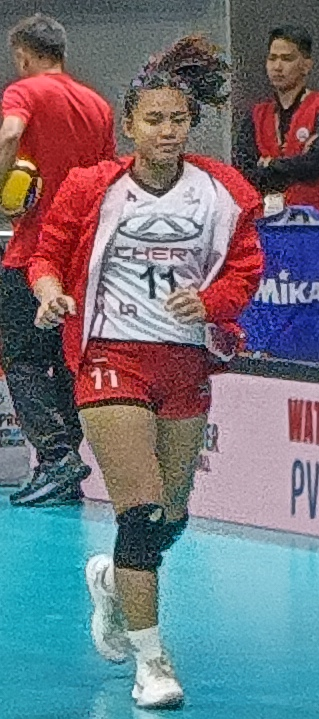
- Bicar in 2025

Personal information
- Full name: Alina Joyce Bicar
- Nickname: Alina
- Nationality: Filipino
- Born: November 17, 1998 (age 27)
- Hometown: Basey, Samar
- Height: 5 ft 6 in (1.68 m)
- Education: University of Santo Tomas

Volleyball information
- Position: Setter
- Number: 18

Career
Years	Teams
2017	Power Smashers
2018	Chooks-to-Go Tacloban Fighting Warays
2018	Smart-Army Giga Hitters
2019	Philippine Army Lady Troopers
2021	BaliPure Purest Water Defenders
2021	Petro Gazz Angels
2022	BaliPure Purest Water Defenders
2022–2025	Chery Tiggo Crossovers
2026–present	Choco Mucho Flying Titans

Alina Joyce Bicar (born November 17, 1998) is a Filipino professional volleyball player for the Choco Mucho Flying Titans of the Premier Volleyball League (PVL). Bicar played setter for and was a former captain of the UST Golden Tigresses.

== Volleyball career ==
=== UAAP ===
Bicar was a member of UST Golden Tigresses collegiate women's University team.

In 2020, Bicar became the captain of the team in the UAAP Season 82 volleyball tournaments but later on, the tournament was cancelled because of the COVID-19 pandemic.

=== PVL ===
Alina Bicar was a member and Captain of BaliPure Purest Water Defenders in 2021. She left BaliPure in the then ongoing 2021 PVL Open Conference and signed for the Petro Gazz Angels.

In 2022, she signed again with BaliPure Purest Water Defenders and was back as the captain of the team for the 2022 PVL Open Conference.

In May 2022, she transferred to Chery Tiggo Crossovers but she and her Teammates EJ Laure, Justine Dorog, and Buding Duremdes missed the 3 games of 2022 PVL Invitational Conference due to the health and safety protocols.

On January 1, 2026, Bicar joined the Choco Mucho Flying Titans following Chery Tiggo's disbandment in December 2025.

== Clubs ==
- (Philippines) Power Smashers (2017)
- (Philippines) Chooks-to-Go Tacloban Fighting Warays (2018)
- (Philippines) Smart-Army Giga Hitters (2018)
- (Philippines) PacificTown-Army Lady Troopers (2019)
- (Philippines) BaliPure Purest Water Defenders (2021, 2022)
- (Philippines) Petro Gazz Angels (2021) (Note: Bicar only played for the team during the 2021 PNVF Champions League for Women before parting ways in January 2022.)
- (Philippines) Chery Tiggo Crossovers (2022–2025)
- (Philippines) Choco Mucho Flying Titans (2026–present)

== Awards ==
=== Collegiate ===
Year	Season	Title	Ref
2017	79	3rd Place	
2019	81	Runner-up	

=== Clubs ===
Year	League	Season/Conference	Team	Title	Ref
2019	PVL	Reinforced	PacificTown-Army Lady Troopers	3rd Place	
2021	PVL	Open	Petro Gazz Angels	3rd Place	
2024	PNVF	Champions League	Chery Tiggo Crossovers	3rd Place	
2025	PVL	on Tour	Chery Tiggo Crossovers	Runner-up	
