= Desiree Cheng =

Filipino women's volleyball player (born 1996)

Personal information
- Full name: Desiree Wynea Tanlo Cheng
- Nickname: Des
- Nationality: Filipino
- Born: September 28, 1996 (age 30) Manila, Philippines
- Education: De La Salle University
- Height: 173 cm (5 ft 8 in)
- Weight: 59 kg (130 lb)
- Spike: 262 cm (103 in)
- Block: 242 cm (95 in)

Volleyball information
- Position: Outside hitter/Team captain
- Current club: Choco Mucho Flying Titans
- Number: 2

Career
- Years: Team
- 2016–2021: F2 Logistics Cargo Movers
- 2022–present: Choco Mucho Flying Titans

Desiree Wynea Tanlo Cheng (born September 28, 1996) is a Filipino professional volleyball player who serves as team captain for the Choco Mucho Flying Titans of the Premier Volleyball League (PVL). She played with De La Salle University collegiate women's varsity volleyball team.

== Personal life ==
Cheng is the youngest of three siblings which include Djanel Cheng, who is also a professional volleyball player. She completed her high school studies at Hope Christian High School and earned her AB Sports Studies degree from De La Salle University.

== Career ==
Cheng won the UAAP Season 79 Finals MVP after DLSU Lady Spikers defeated the Ateneo Lady Eagles in the finals.

Cheng won the Best server award in UAAP Season 80. They defeated the FEU Lady Tamaraws in the finals claiming a 3-peat championship title.

With F2 Logistics Cargo Movers, Cheng won the 2017 PSL Grand Prix Conference championship.

== Awards ==
=== Individual ===
- 2011 Palarong Pambansa "Most valuable player"
- 2011 Palarong Maynila "Most valuable player"
- 2012 Palarong Pambansa "Most valuable player"
- 2012 Palarong Maynila "Most valuable player"
- 2013 Palarong Pambansa "Most valuable player"
- 2013 Palarong Pambansa "Best blocker"
- UAAP Season 79 "Finals Most Valuable Player"
- UAAP Season 80 "Best server"

=== Collegiate ===
- 2014 UAAP Season 76 volleyball tournaments – Silver medal, with De La Salle Lady Spikers
- 2015 UAAP Season 77 volleyball tournaments – Silver medal, with De La Salle Lady Spikers
- 2017 UAAP Season 79 volleyball tournaments – Champion, with De La Salle Lady Spikers
- 2018 UAAP Season 80 volleyball tournaments – Champion, with De La Salle Lady Spikers
- 2019 UAAP Season 81 volleyball tournaments – Bronze medal, with De La Salle Lady Spikers

=== Clubs ===
- 2017 Philippine SuperLiga Grand Prix – Champion, with F2 Logistics Cargo Movers
- 2023 VTV International Women's Volleyball Cup – Bronze medal, with Choco Mucho Flying Titans
- 2023 Premier Volleyball League Second All-Filipino Conference – 1st Runner-Up, with Choco Mucho Flying Titans
- 2024 Premier Volleyball League All-Filipino Conference - 1st Runner-Up, with Choco Mucho Flying Titans
