= Kat Tolentino =

Filipina volleyball player (born 1995)

Personal information
- Full name: Katrina Mae De Lara Tolentino
- Nickname: Kat
- Nationality: Filipino-Canadian
- Born: January 27, 1995 (age 31)
- Home town: Vancouver, British Columbia, Canada
- Education: Ateneo de Manila University
- Height: 1.87 m (6 ft 2 in)

Volleyball information
- Position: Opposite spiker
- Current club: Choco Mucho Flying Titans
- Number: 10

National team
- Years: Team
- 2022–present: Philippines

Katrina Mae De Lara Tolentino (born January 27, 1995) is a Filipino-Canadian professional volleyball player for the Choco Mucho Flying Titans of the Premier Volleyball League (PVL).

== Early life ==
Tolentino was born on January 27, 1995, in Vancouver, British Columbia. She grew up in neighboring Richmond and graduated from McMath Secondary School in 2013.

== College career ==
Following her high school graduation, she relocated to the Philippines to pursue higher education at Ateneo de Manila University. Before relocating to the Philippines, Tolentino had already suffered two anterior cruciate ligament (ACL) injuries in her left knee. Just as she was set to make her debut for the Ateneo Lady Eagles in 2015, she tore the ACL in her right knee during a game in the Shakey's V-League, which required ACL reconstruction surgery and several months of rehabilitation. Tolentino eventually recovered and played for the Lady Eagles, rising to the position of joint team captain alongside Maddie Madayag during UAAP Season 80. After the suspension of UAAP Season 82 due to the COVID-19 pandemic, she chose to forego her final collegiate playing year in 2021 and began pursuing a professional volleyball career.

== Professional career ==
In 2021, Tolentino joined the Choco Mucho Flying Titans in the Premier Volleyball League (PVL).

Tolentino was unable to compete in 2024 due to hearing loss in her left ear. She was sidelined again in 2025 after suffering a ruptured appendix.

== Clubs ==
- (Philippines) Ateneo-Motolite Lady Eagles (2018)
- (Philippines) Choco Mucho Flying Titans (2019–present)

== Awards and honors ==
=== Individual ===
- 2018: Premier Volleyball League Open Conference – Best Opposite Spiker
- 2019: UAAP Season 81 – Best Opposite Spiker
- 2021: Premier Volleyball League Open Conference – Best Opposite Spiker

=== College ===
- 2015: SVL 12th Season Collegiate Conference – Silver medal, with Ateneo Lady Eagles
- 2016: ASEAN University Games – Bronze medal, with Ateneo Lady Eagles
- 2016: SVL 13th Season Collegiate Conference – Silver medal, with Ateneo Lady Eagles
- 2017: UAAP Season 79 Women's Volleyball – Silver medal, with Ateneo Lady Eagles
- 2018: UAAP Season 80 Women's Volleyball – Bronze medal, with Ateneo Lady Eagles
- 2018: Premier Volleyball League Open Conference – Silver medal, with Ateneo-Motolite Lady Eagles
- 2019: UAAP Season 81 Women's Volleyball – Champion, with Ateneo Lady Eagles

=== Club ===
- 2018: Premier Volleyball League Open Conference – Silver medal, with Ateneo-Motolite Lady Eagles
- 2023: VTV International Women's Volleyball Cup – Bronze medal, with Choco Mucho Flying Titans
- 2023: Premier Volleyball League Second All-Filipino Conference – Silver medal, with Choco Mucho Flying Titans
- 2024: Premier Volleyball League All-Filipino Conference – Silver medal, with Choco Mucho Flying Titans

== Personal life ==
Tolentino has two siblings: an older sister named Stephanie and an older brother named Vince. Vince played college basketball for the Ateneo Blue Eagles in the University Athletic Association of the Philippines (UAAP), where he served as the team captain. Following the completion of his collegiate career, he pursued a professional basketball career with the Rain or Shine Elasto Painters in the Philippine Basketball Association (PBA).
