= Deanna Wong =

Filipino volleyball player (born 1998)

Personal information
- Full name: Maria Deanna Izabella Alvizo Wong
- Nationality: Filipino
- Born: July 18, 1998 (age 28)
- Home town: Minglanilla, Cebu, Philippines
- Education: Ateneo de Manila University
- Height: 5 ft 8 in (1.73 m)

Volleyball information
- Position: Libero; Setter
- Number: 3

Career
- Years: Team
- 2016: Ateneo De Manila University Lady Blue Eagles
- 2018: Ateneo-Motolite
- 2021–present: Choco Mucho Flying Titans
- 2021: Team Choco Mucho

National team
- Years: Team
- 2022: Philippines

Maria Deanna Izabella Alvizo Wong (born July 18, 1998) is a Filipino professional volleyball player. Wong was a member of the Ateneo de Manila University Lady Blue Eagles, the school's women's varsity volleyball team from 2016 to 2020. She currently playing for the Choco Mucho Flying Titans in the Premier Volleyball League (PVL).

During Season 80 of the University Athletic Association of the Philippines (UAAP) in 2018, she won the Best Setter Award. While being a part of the team, Ateneo was the UAAP runner-up in 2016 and 2017, won bronze in 2018, and became the champions in 2019. The team, in partnership with Motolite, also reached the finals in the Premier Volleyball League Season 2 Open Conference in 2018.

In June 2020, she was signed by the Choco Mucho Flying Titans.

== Personal life ==
She studied at the Saint Theresa's College of Cebu in elementary and attended the University of San Jose–Recoletos for high school. In college, she took up AB Interdisciplinary Studies at the Ateneo de Manila University.

Wong was previously in a relationship with former Adamson Lady Falcons and Creamline Cool Smashers player Jema Galanza. She is currently in a relationship with former NU Lady Bulldogs and Akari Chargers Opposite Spiker Ivy Lacsina.

== Volleyball ==
She first started playing indoor volleyball in her sixth grade intramural upon her best friend's invitation and continued to play the sport in high school. She then was invited for a three-week training at the San Sebastian College-Recoletos and the Ateneo de Manila University.

=== UAAP ===
By March 2015, she was picked as member of the collegiate varsity women's volleyball team of the Ateneo de Manila University, under then head coach Anusorn "Tai" Bundit and became a rookie in the 2016 UAAP Season 78. She played as a libero in 2017 Season 79 and then as setter the next year for 2018 Season 80, during which she was awarded the Best Setter award. While the team settled for bronze in the previous season, the Ateneo Lady Eagles won the championship for UAAP Season 81 in 2019.

Wong took a hiatus from playing for Ateneo for Season 82. She was set to return in UAAP Season 83 which was cancelled due to the COVID-19 pandemic. Wong was still eligible to compete in UAAP Season 84 but chose to play for the Premier Volleyball League.

=== PVL ===
Wong played in the 2019 Premier Volleyball League Season 2 Open Conference with Ateneo de Manila University, in partnership with Motolite, and the team reached the finals but were defeated by the Creamline Cool Smashers. In 2021, Wong played in Season 4 Open Conference with Choco Mucho Flying Titans, the team owned by Republic Biscuit Corporation.

=== Choco Mucho (AVC) ===
Wong was also part of the Philippine women's national team which competed as the club side, Team Choco Mucho at the 2021 Asian Women's Club Volleyball Championship.

=== National team ===
Wong is also part of the Philippines women's national volleyball team and was supposed to play in the 2021 SEA Games in Quang Ninh, Vietnam.

== Awards ==
On October 2, 2018, she was one of the nominees for Push Sports Personality of the Year.

=== Individual ===
- 2018 UAAP Season 80 Indoor Volleyball Best Setter

=== Collegiate ===
- 2016 UAAP Season 78 Indoor Volleyball – Silver with Ateneo de Manila Lady Eagles
- 2017 UAAP Season 79 Indoor Volleyball – Silver with Ateneo de Manila Lady Eagles
- 2018 UAAP Season 80 Indoor Volleyball – Bronze with Ateneo de Manila Lady Eagles
- 2019 UAAP Season 81 Indoor Volleyball – Champion with Ateneo de Manila Lady Eagles

=== Club ===
- 2018 Premier Volleyball League Open Conference – Silver with Ateneo-Motolite
- 2023 VTV International Women's Volleyball Cup – Bronze medal, with Choco Mucho Flying Titans
- 2023 Premier Volleyball League Second All-Filipino Conference – 1st Runner-Up, with Choco Mucho Flying Titans
- 2024 Premier Volleyball League All-Filipino Conference – 1st Runner-Up, with Choco Mucho Flying Titans
