= Ateneo Blue Eagles women's volleyball =

Collegiate women's volleyball team

Ateneo Blue Eagles
- University: Ateneo de Manila University
- Nickname: Blue Eagles
- Location: Quezon City, Philippines
- Head coach: Yoko Zetterlund
- Captain: Sobe Buena

Main league
- League: UAAP
- Season 88 (2026): 7th

Championships
- NCAA 1 UAAP 3

The Ateneo Blue Eagles program has a women's collegiate varsity volleyball team which represents the Ateneo de Manila University in the University Athletic Association of the Philippines (UAAP).

== History ==
The Ateneo Blue Eagles women's volleyball team was formed in 1975. They first played competitive varsity volleyball when they participated in the women's volleyball tournament of the NCAA (Philippines) in Season 51 (1975–76). The following year, Season 52 (1976–77), the Lady Blue Eagles won their first and only NCAA women's volleyball championship. They were unable to defend their title in the NCAA because Ateneo de Manila transferred to the University Athletic Association of the Philippines (UAAP) in 1978. The team did not win a championship for the next 37 years.

Sherwin Malonzo was appointed as the head of the volleyball program in 2008. In Season 71 (2008–09), Roger Gorayeb was hired as head coach of the Lady Eagles. That same year, Ateneo began to recruit high school players. Five blue-chip high school players (Fille Cainglet, Jem Ferrer, Dzi Gervacio, Gretchen Ho and Ailysse Nacachi) were recruited, and were later dubbed the Fabulous Five by the Ateneo community and fans. Another group of five high school players was recruited the following year. In 2010 Ateneo recruited highly prized UST high school volleyball player Alyssa Valdez, as well as four other high school players. Valdez was a national youth volleyball team standout, dubbed the "Phenom" by the sports press, and a three-time MVP in UAAP high school volleyball. On January 20, 2013, she broke the UAAP volleyball record, by scoring 35 points (31 spikes, 3 blocks and 1 service ace) in the second round elimination game. Prior to her performance, the record had been 33 points, set by an Adamson University player on February 14, 2009.

In 2011 they won the championship of the Shakey's V-League, a summer tournament which the Ateneo Lady Blue Eagles use as a preparation for the UAAP tournament.

Their first title in the UAAP came in Season 76 (2013–14), and they won the title again the following year in Season 77 (2014–15), beating second-seeded De La Salle University in 2 matches. The sweep achieved a 16–0 season record (elimination rounds to championship round), a first for any UAAP women varsity team in the Final Four era. Their third and most recent title was won in Season 81 (2018–19). Prior to these championships, they had nine Final Four appearances (Seasons 70, 72, 73, 74 and 75), with a second seed and twice-to-beat advantage in Season 74 and 75. In Season 72 (2009), the three Ateneo varsity volleyball teams – men's, women's and boys' were in the Final 4.

== Notable players ==
- Charo Soriano
- Fille Cainglet-Cayetano
- Jamenea Ferrer
- Dzi Gervacio
- Gretchen Ho
- Denden Lazaro-Revilla
- Alyssa Valdez
- Jorella Marie de Jesus
- Amy Ahomiro
- Jia Morado-De Guzman
- Ahtisa Manalo
- Bea de Leon
- Maddie Madayag
- Kat Tolentino
- Deanna Wong
- Faith Nisperos
- Chelsea Fernandez
- Vanie Gandler
- Joy Barcoma

== Coaches ==
- Roger Gorayeb
- Tai Bundit
- Oliver Almadro (2018–2023)
- Sergio Veloso (2023–2026)
- Yoko Zetterlund (2026–present)

== Honors ==
- NCAA (1)
  - Season 52 (1976–77)
- UAAP (3)
  - Season 76 (2013–14)
  - Season 77 (2014–15)
  - Season 81 (2018–19)

== See also ==
- Ateneo de Manila University
- Ateneo Blue Eagles
- Ateneo Blue Eagles volleyball (men's team)
- Ateneo–La Salle rivalry
