= Maddie Madayag =

Filipino volleyball player (born 1998)

Personal information
- Full name: Madeleine Yrenea Madayag
- Born: February 7, 1998 (age 28)
- Home town: Davao City, Philippines
- Education: Ateneo de Manila University
- Height: 1.80 m (5 ft 11 in)
- Weight: 78 kg (172 lb)
- Spike: 350 cm (138 in)
- Block: 340 cm (134 in)

Volleyball information
- Position: Middle Blocker
- Current club: Choco Mucho Flying Titans
- Number: 17 (national); 7/19 (club)

Career
- Years: Team
- 2018: Ateneo–Motolite
- 2019–2024: Choco Mucho
- 2024–2025: Kurobe
- 2025–present: Choco Mucho

National team
- Years: Team
- 2019–present: Philippines
Honours
Women's volleyball
Representing Philippines
ASEAN Grand Prix
Bronze medal – third place	2019 Nakhon Ratchasima	Leg 1
Bronze medal – third place	2019 Santa Rosa	Leg 2
Bronze medal – third place	2025 Nakhon Ratchasima	Leg 1
- Updated on August 2025

Madeleine Yrenea Madayag (born February 7, 1998) is a Filipino volleyball player who currently plays for the Choco Mucho Flying Titans in the Premier Volleyball League of the Philippines. She was a member of the collegiate varsity women's volleyball team of Ateneo de Manila University. She is a current member of the Philippines national team.

== Early life and education ==
Originating from Davao City, Madayag attended Davao Christian High School, where she began competing in volleyball, and Ateneo de Manila University, where she took a degree in Interdisciplinary Studies.

== Collegiate career ==
Madayag played for the Ateneo Lady Eagles from 2014 to 2019. She suffered an anterior cruciate ligament injury that sidelined her in the UAAP Season 78 volleyball tournaments in 2016. She eventually recovered and became joint team captain alongside Kat Tolentino in UAAP Season 80 and Bea de Leon in UAAP Season 81.

== Club career ==
After graduating from the Ateneo, Madayag and De Leon joined the Choco Mucho Flying Titans in the Premier Volleyball League under Oliver Almadro in 2019, with Madayag becoming its team captain after de Leon transferred to the Creamline Cool Smashers in 2024.

In September 2024, Madayag left Choco Mucho to play in the Japanese V.League for the Kurobe AquaFairies.

== Clubs ==
- (Philippines) Ateneo–Motolite Volleyball Team (2018)
- (Philippines) Choco Mucho Flying Titans (2019–2024)
- (Japan) Kurobe AquaFairies (2024–2025)
- (Philippines) Choco Mucho Flying Titans (2025–present)

== Awards ==
=== Individual awards ===
- 2018 Premier Volleyball League Open Conference "1st Best Middle Blocker"
- 2019 UAAP Season 81, "Second Best Middle Blocker"
- 2023 VTV International Women's Volleyball Cup, "Best Middle Blocker"
- 2024 Premier Volleyball League All-Filipino Conference "1st Best Middle Blocker"

=== Collegiate ===
- 2015 UAAP Season 77 volleyball tournaments – Champions, with Ateneo De Manila University Lady Eagles
- 2016 UAAP Season 78 volleyball tournaments – Silver medal, with Ateneo De Manila University Lady Eagles
- 2017 UAAP Season 79 volleyball tournaments – Silver medal, with Ateneo De Manila University Lady Eagles
- 2018 UAAP Season 80 volleyball tournaments – Bronze medal, with Ateneo De Manila University Lady Eagles
- 2019 UAAP Season 81 volleyball tournaments – Champions, with Ateneo De Manila University Lady Eagles

=== Club ===
- 2018 Premier Volleyball League Open Conference – Runner-up, with Ateneo–Motolite Lady Eagles
- 2023 VTV International Women's Volleyball Cup – Bronze medal, with Choco Mucho Flying Titans
- 2023 Premier Volleyball League Second All-Filipino Conference – 1st Runner-Up, with Choco Mucho Flying Titans
- 2024 Premier Volleyball League All-Filipino Conference – 1st Runner-Up, with Choco Mucho Flying Titans
