= 2025–26 PLDT High Speed Hitters season =

Eighth season of the PLDT High Speed Hitters; fifth in the PVL

The 2025–26 PLDT High Speed Hitters season was the eighth season of the PLDT High Speed Hitters and fifth in the Premier Volleyball League (PVL).

Before the PVL on Tour, three more players, Rachel Anne Austero, Fiola Ceballos, and Erika Santos also departed from PLDT, the latter moving to sister team Cignal HD Spikers. In the preseason tournament, Cignal topped Pool A with a five-match sweep, gaining the maximum 15 points on the way to the final round. After a sweep against Zus Coffee in the quarterfinals, they were put against Creamline in the semifinals, who they would beat in five sets. In their championship match against Chery Tiggo, PLDT were leading 2–0 before the Crossovers tied the match, forcing a decider set. PLDT then beat Chery Tiggo in the final set, 15–8, to claim their first championship in franchise history and their first podium in the PVL.

PLDT qualified for the Invitational Conference, which saw an equally dominant performance, once again topping the preliminary round with a 5–0 record, dopping only one point from their semifinal match against Creamline in the Tour. They then beat Japanese guest team Kobe Shinwa University to claim their second title.

For the Reinforced Conference, PLDT signed Anastasia Bavykina from Russia to be their foreign guest player.

== Roster ==
PLDT High Speed Hitters roster
No.	Nat.	Player	Pos.	Height	DOB	From
1	(Philippines)	Nieza Viray	Libero	1.65 m (5 ft 5 in)	February 12, 1999 (age 27)	San Beda
2	(Philippines)	Shiela Kiseo	Outside Hitter	1.67 m (5 ft 6 in)	October 20, 2000 (age 25)	Far Eastern
3	(Philippines)	Mika Reyes	Middle Blocker	1.83 m (6 ft 0 in)	June 21, 1994 (age 32)	De La Salle
5	(Philippines)	Alleiah Malaluan	Outside Hitter	1.78 m (5 ft 10 in)	June 24, 2001 (age 25)	De La Salle
6	(Philippines) (Canada)	Savi Davison	Outside Hitter	1.78 m (5 ft 10 in)	January 4, 1999 (age 27)	Oklahoma
7	(Philippines)	Zenneth Perolino	Middle Blocker	1.85 m (6 ft 1 in)	April 8, 2001 (age 25)	Enderun
8	(Philippines)	Kath Arado (C)	Libero	1.65 m (5 ft 5 in)	May 22, 1998 (age 28)	UE
9	(Philippines)	Kim Fajardo	Setter	1.73 m (5 ft 8 in)	September 30, 1993 (age 32)	De La Salle
10	(Philippines)	Majoy Baron	Middle Blocker	1.83 m (6 ft 0 in)	December 10, 1994 (age 31)	De La Salle
11	(Philippines)	Kim Kianna Dy	Opposite Hitter	1.80 m (5 ft 11 in)	July 26, 1995 (age 31)	De La Salle
13	(Philippines)	Dell Palomata	Middle Blocker	1.91 m (6 ft 3 in)	November 1, 1995 (age 30)	USLS
14	(Philippines)	Kiesha Bedonia	Outside Hitter	1.67 m (5 ft 6 in)	December 29, 2002 (age 23)	Far Eastern
15	(Philippines)	Angelica Legacion	Setter	1.60 m (5 ft 3 in)	August 15, 1993 (age 33)	Arellano
16	(Philippines)	Angelica Alcantara	Setter	1.63 m (5 ft 4 in)	November 25, 2000 (age 25)	Adamson
17	(Philippines)	Seth Rodriguez	Middle Blocker	1.79 m (5 ft 10 in)	September 22, 1998 (age 27)	UE
18	(Philippines)	Jessey de Leon	Opposite Hitter	1.80 m (5 ft 11 in)	December 18, 1994 (age 31)	UST
19	(Philippines)	Jovie Prado	Outside Hitter	1.73 m (5 ft 8 in)	July 30, 1996 (age 30)	Arellano

Coaching staff

- Head coach:
  (Philippines) Rald Ricafort
- Assistant coaches:
  (Philippines) Arnold Laniog
  (Philippines) Manolo Refugia Jr.
  (Philippines) Fritz Michael Santos
  (Philippines) Ervin James Peralta
- Strength & conditioning coach:
  (Philippines) Juan Paolo Escaño

Team staff

- Team manager:
  (Philippines) Christian Joy del Rosario

Medical staff

- Physical therapists:
  (Philippines) Kenneth Mary Jane Yam
  (Philippines) Nica Claire Ozoa

=== National team players ===
Players who are part of the Philippines women's national team are excluded from playing with the team due to various commitments. This affected the team's roster for both the PVL on Tour and Invitational Conference.

- Alleiah Malaluan
- Dell Palomata

== Draft ==
Round	Pick	Player	Pos.	School
1	9	Alleiah Malaluan	OP/OH	De La Salle
2	21	Zenneth Perolino	MB	Enderun

== PVL on Tour ==
=== Preliminary round ===
==== Pool A standings ====
Pos	Team	Pld	W	L	Pts	SW	SL	SR	SPW	SPL	SPR	Qualification
1	PLDT High Speed Hitters	5	5	0	15	15	1	15.000	400	298	1.342	Final round
2	Nxled Chameleons	5	4	1	11	12	6	2.000	408	381	1.071	Final round
3	Farm Fresh Foxies	5	3	2	9	9	7	1.286	359	371	0.968	Knockout round
4	Petro Gazz Angels	5	2	3	7	8	10	0.800	390	406	0.961	Knockout round
5	Choco Mucho Flying Titans	5	1	4	3	7	13	0.538	439	481	0.913	Knockout round

Source: PVL.ph

==== Match log ====
2025 PVL on Tour preliminary round match log
Total: 5–0 (15 points)
July: 5–0 (15 points)

Match	Date	Opponent	Sets	Total	Location Attendance	Record	Pts	Report
1	July 1, 2025	Farm Fresh	3–0	78–65	Filoil Centre; 950	1–0	3	P2
2	July 12, 2025	Petro Gazz	3–0	75–53	Capital Arena; 6,448	2–0	6	P2
3	July 13, 2025	Choco Mucho	3–1	97–80	Capital Arena; 7,693	3–0	9	P2
4	July 26, 2025	Nxled	3–0	75–49	University of San Jose–Recoletos; 2,157	4–0	12	P2
5	July 27, 2025	Galeries Tower	3–0	75–51	University of San Jose–Recoletos; 1,398	5–0	15	P2

=== Final round ===
==== Bracket ====
Quarterfinals
August 7
1 PLDT	3
8 Zus Coffee	0
August 9
4 Creamline	3
5 Farm Fresh	0
August 7
2 Cignal	3
7 Akari	0
August 9
3 Nxled	0
6 Chery Tiggo	3

Semifinals
August 12
PLDT	3
Creamline	2
August 12
Cignal	1
Chery Tiggo	3

Championship
August 17
PLDT	3
Chery Tiggo	2
3rd place match
August 17
Creamline	3
Cignal	0

==== Match log ====
2025 PVL on Tour final round match log
Total: 3–0 (7 points)
Quarterfinals: 1–0 (3 points)

Date	Opponent	Sets	Total	Location Attendance	Report
August 7, 2025	Zus Coffee	3–0	75–61	PhilSports Arena; 1,135	P2

Semifinals: 1–0 (2 points)

Date	Opponent	Sets	Total	Location Attendance	Report
August 12, 2025	Creamline	3–2	108–101	Smart Araneta Coliseum; 3,709	P2

Championship: 1–0 (2 points)

Date	Opponent	Sets	Total	Location Attendance	Report
August 17, 2025	Chery Tiggo	3–2	108–93	SM Mall of Asia Arena; 11,055	P2

== Invitational Conference ==
=== Preliminary round ===
==== Standings ====
Pos	Team	Pld	W	L	Pts	SW	SL	SR	SPW	SPL	SPR	Qualification
1	PLDT High Speed Hitters	5	5	0	14	15	3	5.000	434	344	1.262	Championship match
2	Kobe Shinwa University	5	4	1	11	12	7	1.714	442	402	1.100	Championship match
3	Chery Tiggo Crossovers	5	3	2	9	11	9	1.222	430	425	1.012	3rd place match
4	Creamline Cool Smashers	5	2	3	7	11	11	1.000	482	460	1.048	3rd place match
5	Cignal HD Spikers	5	1	4	4	7	13	0.538	398	433	0.919	

Source: Premier Volleyball League

==== Match log ====
2025 PVL Invitational Conference preliminary round match log
Total: 5–0 (14 points)
August: 5–0 (14 points)

Match	Date	Opponent	Sets	Total	Location Attendance	Record	Pts	Report
– (Note: The result of PLDT's game against Creamline in the PVL on Tour semifinals was carried over to the Invitational Conference preliminary round. It is shown for the purpose of completeness.)	August 12, 2025	Creamline	3–2	108–101	Smart Araneta Coliseum; 3,709	1–0	2	P2
1	August 21, 2025	Chery Tiggo	3–0	75–50	PhilSports Arena; 2,627	2–0	5	P2
2	August 23, 2025	Cignal	3–0	75–54	PhilSports Arena; 2,046	3–0	8	P2
3	August 25, 2025	Kobe Shinwa	3–0	75–65	PhilSports Arena; 420	4–0	11	P2
4	August 28, 2025	Zus Coffee	3–1	99–74	Smart Araneta Coliseum; 352	5–0	14	P2

=== Final round ===
==== Match log ====
2025 PVL on Tour final round match log
Total: 3–0 (7 points)
Championship: 1–0 (3 points)

Date	Opponent	Sets	Total	Location Attendance	Report
August 31, 2025	Kobe Shinwa	3–1	102–94	Smart Araneta Coliseum; 3,449	P2

== Reinforced Conference ==
=== Preliminary round ===
==== Standings ====
Pos	Team	Pld	W	L	Pts	SW	SL	SR	SPW	SPL	SPR	Qualification
1	Farm Fresh Foxies	8	7	1	21	22	7	3.143	694	618	1.123	Quarterfinals
2	Zus Coffee Thunderbelles	8	7	1	20	21	8	2.625	688	596	1.154	Quarterfinals
3	PLDT High Speed Hitters	8	6	2	18	19	9	2.111	669	591	1.132	Quarterfinals
4	Creamline Cool Smashers	8	5	3	17	20	12	1.667	729	661	1.103	Quarterfinals
5	Petro Gazz Angels	8	5	3	14	17	14	1.214	718	669	1.073	Quarterfinals

Source: Premier Volleyball League

==== Match log ====
2025 PVL Reinforced Conference preliminary round match log
Total: 6–2 (18 points)
First round: 4–1 (12 points)

Match	Date	Opponent	Sets	Total	Location Attendance	Record	Pts	Report
1	October 13, 2025	Capital1	3–0	75–65	Smart Araneta Coliseum; 1,390	1–0	3	P2
2	October 16, 2025	Choco Mucho	3–0	75–60	Smart Araneta Coliseum; 1,867	2–0	6	P2
3	October 21, 2025	Cignal	0–3	60–75	Smart Araneta Coliseum; 1,260	2–1	6	P2
4	October 25, 2025	Farm Fresh	3–1	97–78	Ynares Center Montalban; 810	3–1	9	P2
5	October 31, 2025	Nxled	3–0	75–63	Filoil Centre; 2,352	4–1	12	P2

Second round: 2–1 (6 points)

Match	Date	Opponent	Sets	Total	Location Attendance	Record	Pts	Report
6	November 8, 2025	Galeries Tower	3–1	94–81	Candon City Arena; 1,550	5–1	15	P2
7	November 15, 2025	Chery Tiggo	3–1	101–69	Ynares Center Montalban; 622	6–1	18	P2
8	November 20, 2025	Petro Gazz	1–3	92–100	SM Mall of Asia Arena; 1,274	6–2	18	P2

=== Final round ===
==== Bracket ====
Quarterfinals
November 24
Farm Fresh	0
Akari	3
November 24
Creamline	1
Petro Gazz	3
November 24
Zus Coffee	3
Capital1	0
November 24
PLDT	3
Cignal	1

Semifinals
November 27
Akari	2
Petro Gazz	3
November 27
Zus Coffee	3
PLDT	0

Championship
November 30
Petro Gazz	3
Zus Coffee	1
3rd-place match
November 30
Akari	3
PLDT	2

==== Match log ====
2024–25 PVL All-Filipino Conference final round match log
Total: 1–2 (4 points)
Quarterfinals: 1–0 (3 points)

Date	Opponent	Sets	Total	Location Attendance	Report
November 24, 2025	Cignal	3–1	98–85	Smart Araneta Coliseum; 3,557	P2

Semifinals: 0–1 (0 points)

Date	Opponent	Sets	Total	Location Attendance	Report
November 27, 2025	Zus Coffee	0–3	70–78	Smart Araneta Coliseum; 2,063	P2

Third-place match: 0–1 (1 point)

Date	Opponent	Sets	Total	Location Attendance	Report
November 30, 2025	Akari	2–3	115–107	Smart Araneta Coliseum; 1,998	P2

== All-Filipino Conference ==
=== Preliminary round ===
==== Standings ====
Pos	Team	Pld	W	L	Pts	SW	SL	SR	SPW	SPL	SPR	Qualification
1	PLDT High Speed Hitters	9	7	2	20	22	11	2.000	769	698	1.102	Qualifying round
2	Cignal Super Spikers	9	6	3	20	22	11	2.000	772	687	1.124	Qualifying round
3	Creamline Cool Smashers	9	6	3	16	20	16	1.250	700	662	1.057	Qualifying round
4	Farm Fresh Foxies	9	5	4	17	22	16	1.375	850	771	1.102	Qualifying round
5	Nxled Chameleons	9	5	4	15	20	16	1.250	810	773	1.048	Play-in tournament semifinals

Source: Premier Volleyball League

==== Match log ====
2026 PVL All-Filipino Conference preliminary round match log
Total: 7–2 (20 points)
February: 4–1 (12 points)

Match	Date	Opponent	Sets	Total	Location Attendance	Record	Pts	Report
1	February 5, 2026	Creamline	3–0	75–62	Filoil Centre; 2,400	1–0	3	P2
2	February 12, 2026	Capital1	3–1	97–78	Filoil Centre; 601	2–0	6	P2
3	February 19, 2026	Akari	3–1	100–85	Filoil Centre; 386	3–0	9	P2
4	February 24, 2026	Cignal	0–3	63–75	Filoil Centre; 1,025	3–1	9	P2
5	February 28, 2026	Zus Coffee	3–0	75–59	Filoil Centre; 1,056	4–1	12	P2

March: 3–1 (8 points)

Match	Date	Opponent	Sets	Total	Location Attendance	Record	Pts	Report
6	March 5, 2026	Farm Fresh	3–2	111–102	Filoil Centre; 440	1–0	14	P2
7	March 10, 2026	Galeries Tower	3–0	75–57	Filoil Centre; 588	2–0	17	P2
8	March 14, 2026	Choco Mucho	3–1	98–84	Filoil Centre; 2,409	3–0	20	P2
9	March 19, 2026	Nxled	1–3	75–96	Filoil Centre; 799	3–1	20	P2

=== Qualifying round ===
==== Match log ====
2026 PVL All-Filipino Conference qualifying round match log
Total: 1–0 (3 points)
Qualifying round: 1–0 (3 points)

Date	Opponent	Sets	Total	Location Attendance	Report
March 26, 2026	Farm Fresh	3–1	93–85	Smart Araneta Coliseum; 1,534	P2

=== Semifinal round ===
==== Standings ====
Pos	Team	Pld	W	L	Pts	SW	SL	SR	SPW	SPL	SPR	Qualification
1	Cignal Super Spikers	3	2	1	6	6	5	1.200	248	207	1.198	Finals
2	Creamline Cool Smashers	3	2	1	5	7	6	1.167	270	289	0.934	Finals
3	PLDT High Speed Hitters	3	1	2	4	6	6	1.000	276	266	1.038	Third place series
4	Farm Fresh Foxies	3	1	2	3	5	7	0.714	245	278	0.881	Third place series

Source: Premier Volleyball League

==== Match log ====
2026 PVL All-Filipino Conference semifinal round match log
Total: 1–2 (4 points)
Semifinals: 1–2 (4 points)

Match	Date	Opponent	Sets	Total	Location Attendance	Record	Pts	Report
1	April 11, 2026	Creamline	2–3	111–111	SM Mall of Asia Arena; 9,940	0–1	1	P2
2	April 14, 2026	Farm Fresh	1–3	90–93	SM Mall of Asia Arena; 6,047	0–2	1	P2
3	April 16, 2026	Cignal	3–0	75–62	Filoil Centre; 3,761	1–2	4	P2

=== 3rd place series ===
==== Match log ====
2026 PVL All-Filipino Conference 3rd place series match log
Total: 2–0 (4 points)
3rd place: 2–0 (4 points)

Match	Date	Opponent	Sets	Total	Location Attendance	Record	Pts	Report
1	April 21, 2026	Farm Fresh	3–2	115–110	Smart Araneta Coliseum; 3,214	1–0	2	P2
2	April 23, 2026	Farm Fresh	3–2	107–90	Smart Araneta Coliseum; 8,609	2–0	4	P2

== Transactions ==
=== Additions ===
Player	Date signed	Previous team	Ref.
Alleiah Malaluan	June 11, 2025	De La Salle Lady Spikers (UAAP)	
Zenneth Perolino	June 12, 2025	Enderun Colleges Lady Titans (NAASCU)	
Seth Rodriguez	January 3, 2026	Chery Tiggo EV Crossovers	

=== Subtractions ===
Player	New team	Ref.
Rachel Anne Austero	Capital1 Solar Spikers	
Fiola Ceballos	Zus Coffee Thunderbelles	
Jules Samonte	Chery Tiggo Crossovers	
Erika Santos	Cignal HD Spikers	

=== On temporary release ===
Player	Temporary team	Return date	Ref.
Dell Palomata	Medan Falcons (Indonesia)	To be announced	

=== Foreign guest player ===
Team	Foreign player	Moving from	Ref.
PLDT High Speed Hitters	(Russia) Anastasiia Bavykina	(United States) Columbus Fury	
