= 2024–25 PLDT High Speed Hitters season =

Filipino women's volleyball team season

The 2024–25 PLDT High Speed Hitters season was the seventh season of the PLDT High Speed Hitters and fourth in the Premier Volleyball League (PVL).

In the All-Filipino Conference, the High Speed Hitters started the season strong by winning their first three matches before losing to Chery Tiggo on December 3, 2024. The loss to the Crossovers started a slump where the team only won one out of the next four matches, but the team made up for it by winning their last four matches, including a five-set win over the Creamline Cool Smashers on February 15, 2025. The team finished fourth with an 8–3 record and 23 points. After beating the Zus Coffee Thunderbelles in the qualifying round, the team was bound for the final round where they were swept in two matches by the Choco Mucho Flying Titans.

PLDT qualified for the 2025 AVC Women's Volleyball Champions League as a wild card participant. In Pool D, the team first beat the Queensland Pirates from Australia in straight sets before losing to Thailand's Nakhon Ratchasima VC in a close five-set match. The team ended their run in the tournament against Zhetysu VC from Kazakhstan.

== Roster ==
PLDT High Speed Hitters
No.	Player	Position	Height	Birth date	School
1	(Philippines) Maria Nieza Viray	Libero	1.65 m (5 ft 5 in)	February 12, 1999 (age 27)	SBU
2	(Philippines) Shiela Mae Kiseo	Outside Hitter	1.67 m (5 ft 6 in)	October 20, 2000 (age 25)	FEU
3	(Philippines) Mika Reyes	Middle Blocker	1.83 m (6 ft 0 in)	June 21, 1994 (age 32)	DLSU
5	(Philippines) Erika Mae Santos	Opposite Hitter	1.76 m (5 ft 9 in)	May 13, 1998 (age 28)	DLSU
6	(Philippines) (Canada) Savi Davison	Outside Hitter	1.78 m (5 ft 10 in)	January 4, 1999 (age 27)	OU
8	(Philippines) Kath Arado (C)	Libero	1.65 m (5 ft 5 in)	May 22, 1998 (age 28)	UE
9	(Philippines) Kim Fajardo	Setter	1.73 m (5 ft 8 in)	September 30, 1993 (age 32)	DLSU
10	(Philippines) Majoy Baron	Middle Blocker	1.83 m (6 ft 0 in)	December 10, 1994 (age 31)	DLSU
11	(Philippines) Kim Kianna Dy	Opposite Hitter	1.80 m (5 ft 11 in)	July 26, 1995 (age 30)	DLSU
13	(Philippines) Dell Palomata	Middle Blocker	1.91 m (6 ft 3 in)	November 1, 1995 (age 30)	USLS
14	(Philippines) Kiesha Dazzie Bedonia	Outside Hitter	1.67 m (5 ft 6 in)	December 29, 2002 (age 23)	FEU
15	(Philippines) Angelica Legacion	Setter	1.60 m (5 ft 3 in)	August 15, 1993 (age 32)	Arellano
16	(Philippines) Angelica Alcantara	Setter	1.63 m (5 ft 4 in)	November 25, 2000 (age 25)	AdU
17	(Philippines) Fiola Ceballos	Outside Hitter	1.70 m (5 ft 7 in)	June 21, 1994 (age 32)	CPU
18	(Philippines) Jessey Laine De Leon	Middle Blocker	1.80 m (5 ft 11 in)	December 18, 1994 (age 31)	UST
19	(Philippines) Jovie Prado	Outside Hitter	1.73 m (5 ft 8 in)	July 30, 1996 (age 27)	AU
25	(Philippines) Rachel Anne Austero	Middle Blocker	1.75 m (5 ft 9 in)	August 3, 1997 (age 28)	CSB

Head coach

- (Philippines) Rald Ricafort

Assistant coaches

- (Philippines) Arnold Laniog
- (Philippines) Manolo Refugia Jr
- (Philippines) Fritz Michael Santos

Team Coordinator

- (Philippines) Francis Ramos

Team manager

- (Philippines) Del Rosario / Nadal

Statistician

- (Philippines) Ervin James Peralta

Doctor Physical Therapist

- (Philippines) Kenneth Mary Jane Yam
- (Philippines) Allyza Kheil Bautista

== 2024 All-Filipino Conference ==
=== Preliminary round ===
==== Standings ====
Pos	Team	Pld	W	L	Pts	SW	SL	SR	SPW	SPL	SPR	Qualification
3	Chery Tiggo Crossovers	11	9	2	25	28	11	2.545	899	781	1.151	Final round
4	Creamline Cool Smashers	11	8	3	24	27	13	2.077	946	831	1.138	Final round
5	PLDT High Speed Hitters	11	8	3	23	25	12	2.083	859	726	1.183	
6	Cignal HD Spikers	11	7	4	22	23	14	1.643	869	747	1.163	
7	Akari Chargers	11	5	6	15	17	18	0.944	767	750	1.023	

Source: TeamPilipinas.info

==== Match log ====
2024 PVL All-Filipino Conference preliminary round match log
Total: 8–3 (23 points)
February: 2–0 (6 points)

Match	Date	Opponent	Sets	Total	Location Attendance	Record	Pts	Report
1	February 22, 2024	Galeries Tower	3–0	75–37	Filoil EcoOil Centre; 908	1–0	3	P2
2	February 27, 2024	Nxled	3–0	75–62	PhilSports Arena; 1,095	2–0	6	P2

March: 3–1 (8 points)

Match	Date	Opponent	Sets	Total	Location Attendance	Record	Pts	Report
3	March 2, 2024	Petro Gazz	0–3	60–75	PhilSports Arena; 3,270	2–1	6	P2
4	March 9, 2024	Capital1	3–0	75–44	Filoil EcoOil Centre; 644	3–1	9	P2
5	March 19, 2024	Choco Mucho	3–2	99–95	Filoil EcoOil Centre; 1,667	4–1	11	P2
6	March 23, 2024	Farm Fresh	3–0	75–43	Ynares Center; 3,070	5–1	14	P2

April: 3–2 (9 points)

Match	Date	Opponent	Sets	Total	Location Attendance	Record	Pts	Report
7	April 2, 2024	Akari	3–0	75–56	PhilSports Arena; 863	6–1	17	P2
8	April 9, 2024	Strong Group	3–0	75–50	PhilSports Arena; 507	7–1	20	P2
9	April 16, 2024	Chery Tiggo	0–3	58–75	PhilSports Arena; 2,254	7–2	20	P2
10	April 20, 2024	Cignal	3–1	93–103	Santa Rosa Sports Complex; 3,314	7–3	20	P2
11	April 25, 2024	Creamline	3–1	99–86	PhilSports Arena; 3,546	8–3	23	P2

== Draft ==
Round	Pick	Player	Position	School
1	8	Angelica Alcantara	S	Adamson

The PLDT High Speed Hitters selected Angelica Alcantara with the 8th pick before passing during the second round.

== Reinforced Conference ==
=== Preliminary round ===
==== Standings ====
Pos	Team	Pld	W	L	Pts	SW	SL	SR	SPW	SPL	SPR	Qualification
2	Cignal HD Spikers	8	7	1	20	22	8	2.750	648	562	1.153	Quarterfinals
3	Creamline Cool Smashers	8	6	2	20	22	9	2.444	744	653	1.139	Quarterfinals
4	PLDT High Speed Hitters	8	6	2	19	22	9	2.444	713	622	1.146	Quarterfinals
5	Chery Tiggo Crossovers	8	5	3	15	18	12	1.500	649	635	1.022	Quarterfinals
6	Petro Gazz Angels	8	5	3	14	17	13	1.308	676	638	1.060	Quarterfinals

Source: Premier Volleyball League

==== Match log ====
2024 PVL Reinforced Conference preliminary round match log
Total: 6–2 (19 points)
July: 3–0 (8 points)

Match	Date	Opponent	Sets	Total	Location Attendance	Record	Pts	Report
1	July 16, 2024	Creamline	3–2	105–104	PhilSports Arena; 2,660	1–0	2	P2
2	July 20, 2024	Galeries Tower	3–0	75–52	PhilSports Arena; 1,705	2–0	5	P2
3	July 30, 2024	Nxled	3–0	82–65	PhilSports Arena; 1,897	3–0	8	P2

August: 3–2 (11 points)

Match	Date	Opponent	Sets	Total	Location Attendance	Record	Pts	Report
4	August 3, 2024	Chery Tiggo	2–3	99–106	PhilSports Arena; 1,964	3–1	9	P2
5	August 8, 2024	Farm Fresh	3–0	75–66	PhilSports Arena; 416	4–1	12	P2
6	August 13, 2024	Zus Coffee Thunderbelles	3–0	75–44	PhilSports Arena; 1,536	5–1	15	P2
7	August 17, 2024	Petro Gazz	2–3	106–107	SM Mall of Asia; 4,700	5–2	16	P2
8	August 22, 2024	Choco Mucho	3–1	96–78	Filoil EcoOil Centre; 1,415	6–2	19	P2

=== Final round ===
==== Bracket ====
Quarterfinals
August 24
1 Akari	3
8 Farm Fresh	1
August 27
4 PLDT	3
5 Chery Tiggo	2
August 24
2 Cignal	3
7 Capital1	2
August 27
3 Creamline	3
6 Petro Gazz	0

Semifinals
August 31
Akari	3
PLDT	2
August 31
Cignal	2
Creamline	3

Championship
September 4
Akari	0
Creamline	3
3rd place match
September 4
PLDT	1
Cignal	3

==== Match log ====
2024 PVL Reinforced Conference final round match log
Total: 1–2 (3 points)
Quarterfinals: 1–0 (2 points)

Date	Opponent	Sets	Total	Location Attendance	Report
August 27, 2024	Chery Tiggo	3–2	105–102	Filoil EcoOil Centre; 1,598	P2

Semifinals: 0–1 (1 points)

Date	Opponent	Sets	Total	Location Attendance	Report
August 31, 2024	Akari	2–3	111–108	SM Mall of Asia Arena; 7,496	P2

Third-place match: 0–1 (0 points)

Date	Opponent	Sets	Total	Location Attendance	Report
September 4, 2024	Cignal	1–3	85–96	PhilSports Arena; 5,511	P2

== 2024–25 All-Filipino Conference ==
=== Preliminary round ===
==== Standings ====
Pos	Team	Pld	W	L	Pts	SW	SL	SR	SPW	SPL	SPR	Qualification
2	Petro Gazz Angels	11	10	1	29	30	8	3.750	909	770	1.181	2025 AVC Women's Champions League and Qualifying round
3	Cignal HD Spikers	11	8	3	25	27	12	2.250	909	794	1.145	Qualifying round
4	PLDT High Speed Hitters	11	8	3	23	27	13	2.077	927	842	1.101	Qualifying round
5	Choco Mucho Flying Titans	11	8	3	20	27	20	1.350	1064	1031	1.032	Qualifying round
6	Farm Fresh Foxies	11	5	6	15	18	22	0.818	847	915	0.926	Qualifying round

Source: Premier Volleyball League

==== Match log ====
2024–25 PVL All-Filipino Conference preliminary round match log
Total: 8–3 (23 points)
November: 3–0 (9 points)

Match	Date	Opponent	Sets	Total	Location Attendance	Record	Pts	Report
1	November 12, 2024	Nxled	3–1	97–79	PhilSports Arena; 280	1–0	3	P2
2	November 19, 2024	Galeries Tower	3–0	77–70	Ynares Center; 388	2–0	6	P2
3	November 26, 2024	Capital1	3–0	75–54	PhilSports Arena; 291	3–0	9	P2

December: 0–2 (0 points)

Match	Date	Opponent	Sets	Total	Location Attendance	Record	Pts	Report
4	December 3, 2024	Chery Tiggo	1–3	82–95	Smart Araneta Coliseum; 5,229	3–1	9	P2
5	December 10, 2024	Petro Gazz	1–3	81–87	PhilSports Arena; 572	3–2	9	P2

January: 2–1 (6 points)

Match	Date	Opponent	Sets	Total	Location Attendance	Record	Pts	Report
6	January 18, 2025	Akari	3–0	75–53	PhilSports Arena; 2,875	4–2	12	P2
7	January 23, 2025	Choco Mucho	1–3	83–96	PhilSports Arena; 1,482	4–3	12	P2
8	January 28, 2025	Cignal	3–1	95–88	PhilSports Arena; 1,645	5–3	15	P2

February: 3–0 (8 points)

Match	Date	Opponent	Sets	Total	Location Attendance	Record	Pts	Report
9	February 4, 2025	Farm Fresh	3–0	75–56	PhilSports Arena; 325	6–3	18	P2
10	February 15, 2025	Creamline	3–2	112–113	Ynares Center; 5,055	7–3	20	P2
11	February 22, 2025	Zus Coffee	3–0	75–51	City of Passi Arena; 2,278	8–3	23	P2

=== Qualifying round ===
==== Match log ====
2024–25 PVL All-Filipino Conference qualifying round match log
Total: 1–0 (3 points)
Qualifying round: 1–0 (3 points)

Date	Opponent	Sets	Total	Location Attendance	Report
March 4, 2025	Zus Coffee	3–1	96–89	PhilSports Arena; 789	P2

=== Final round ===
==== Bracket ====
Quarterfinals
1	Creamline	2
8	Chery Tiggo	0
2	Petro Gazz	2
7	Zus Coffee	1
3	Galeries Tower	0
6	Akari	2
4	PLDT	0
5	Choco Mucho	2

Semifinals
Creamline	6
Petro Gazz	9
Choco Mucho	1
Akari	2

Finals
Championship
Creamline	1
Petro Gazz	2
Third-place
Choco Mucho	1
Akari	2

==== Match log ====
2024–25 PVL All-Filipino Conference final round match log
Total: 0–2 (2 points)
Quarterfinals: 0–2 (2 points)

Match	Date	Opponent	Sets	Total	Location Attendance	Series	Report
1	March 15, 2025	Choco Mucho	2–3	101–107	PhilSports Arena; 3,408	0–1	P2
2	March 20, 2025	Choco Mucho	2–3	101–98	PhilSports Arena; 2,443	0–2	P2

== AVC Women's Volleyball Champions League ==
=== Preliminary round ===
==== Match log ====
Date	Time		Score		Set 1	Set 2	Set 3	Set 4	Set 5	Total	Report
Apr. 20	19:00	Queensland Pirates (Australia)	0–3	(Philippines) PLDT High Speed Hitters	19–25	12–25	12–25			43–75	P2 Report
Apr. 22	16:00	PLDT High Speed Hitters (Philippines)	2–3	(Thailand) Nakhon Ratchasima Qmin C VC	24–26	20–25	25–20	25–20	9–15	103–106	P2 Report

=== Final round ===
==== Quarterfinals ====
Date	Time		Score		Set 1	Set 2	Set 3	Set 4	Set 5	Total	Report
Apr. 24	16:00	Zhetysu VC (Kazakhstan)	3–0	(Philippines) PLDT High Speed Hitters	25–13	25–22	25–20			75–55	P2 Report

== Transactions ==
=== Additions ===
Player	Date signed	Previous team	Ref.
Kim Kianna Dy	January 4, 2024	F2 Logistics Cargo Movers	
Majoy Baron	January 4, 2024	F2 Logistics Cargo Movers	
Kim Fajardo	January 4, 2024	F2 Logistics Cargo Movers	
Sheila Kiseo	January 20, 2024	FEU Lady Tamaraws (UAAP)	
Kiesha Bedonia	February 9, 2024	FEU Lady Tamaraws (UAAP)	
Angelica Alcantara	July 11, 2024	Adamson Lady Falcons (UAAP)	
Angelica Legacion	October 27, 2024	Farm Fresh Foxies	

=== Subtractions ===
Player	New team	Ref.
Angelica Legacion	Farm Fresh Foxies	
Lutgarda Malaluan	Choco Mucho Flying Titans	
Mean Mendrez	Choco Mucho Flying Titans	
Michelle Morente	Petro Gazz Angels	
Jules Samonte	Chery Tiggo Crossovers	
Royse Tubino	Choco Mucho Flying Titans	

=== Foreign guest player ===
Team	Foreign player	Moving from	Ref.
PLDT High Speed Hitters	(Russia) Elena Samoilenko	(Kazakhstan) Turan Turkistan	
