= 2026 PLDT High Speed Hitters season =

The 2026 PLDT High Speed Hitters season may refer to:

- 2025–26 PLDT High Speed Hitters season
- 2026–27 PLDT High Speed Hitters season
