= 2026–27 PLDT High Speed Hitters season =

Filipino women's volleyball team season

The 2026–27 PLDT High Speed Hitters season will be the ninth season of the PLDT High Speed Hitters and sixth in the Premier Volleyball League (PVL).

The PLDT High Speed Hitters opens their campaign in the PVL on Tour, also known as PVL on Tour Showdown, with a four-set victory over the Choco Mucho Flying Titans on July 25, 2026 in Vigan, Ilocos Sur. On August 7, 2026, PLDT match with the Zus Coffee Thunderbelles to be played in Santiago, Isabela on August 8, was postponed by the PVL due to Tropical Depression Maymay. PLDT closes out their on tour series caravan with a 2–0 record, completing a perfect preseason run despite playing one fewer match than originally scheduled, a four-set victory over the Akari Chargers on August 15, 2026 in Tubod, Lanao del Norte.

In the Invitational Conference, PLDT together with Nxled and Creamline all wound up with identical 3–2 record in the prelims, but the Chameleons grabbed the second finals berth with 10 FIVB tiebreak points. The Cool Smashers settled for third with nine, while the High Speed Hitters finished fourth with eight. Est Cola earlier grabbed the first championship slot due to their superior 4–1 record. The High Speed Hitters repulsed the Cool Smashers in the bronze medal match, rallying from a fourth-set deficit to pound out a four-set victory and finish the tournament on the podium.

== Roster ==
PLDT High Speed Hitters roster
No.	Nat.	Player	Pos.	Height	DOB	From
1	(Philippines)	Nieza Viray	Libero	1.65 m (5 ft 5 in)	February 12, 1999 (age 27)	San Beda
2	(Philippines)	Shiela Kiseo	Outside Hitter	1.67 m (5 ft 6 in)	October 20, 2000 (age 26)	Far Eastern
3	(Philippines)	Mika Reyes	Middle Blocker	1.83 m (6 ft 0 in)	June 21, 1994 (age 32)	De La Salle
4	(Philippines)	Winnie Bedaña	Middle Blocker	1.70 m (5 ft 7 in)	March 20, 2001 (age 25)	UPHSD
5	(Philippines)	Alleiah Malaluan	Outside Hitter	1.78 m (5 ft 10 in)	June 24, 2001 (age 25)	De La Salle
6	(Philippines) (Canada)	Savi Davison	Outside Hitter	1.78 m (5 ft 10 in)	January 4, 1999 (age 27)	Oklahoma
7	(Philippines)	Seth Rodriguez	Middle Blocker	1.79 m (5 ft 10 in)	September 22, 1998 (age 28)	UE
8	(Philippines)	Kath Arado (C)	Libero	1.65 m (5 ft 5 in)	May 22, 1998 (age 28)	UE
9	(Philippines)	Kim Fajardo	Setter	1.73 m (5 ft 8 in)	September 30, 1993 (age 33)	De La Salle
10	(Philippines)	Majoy Baron	Middle Blocker	1.83 m (6 ft 0 in)	December 10, 1994 (age 31)	De La Salle
11	(Philippines)	Kim Kianna Dy	Opposite Hitter	1.80 m (5 ft 11 in)	July 26, 1995 (age 31)	De La Salle
12	(Philippines)	Fianne Ariola	Setter	1.65 m (5 ft 5 in)	November 23, 2002 (age 23)	UPHSD
13	(Philippines)	Dell Palomata	Middle Blocker	1.91 m (6 ft 3 in)	November 1, 1995 (age 31)	USLS
14	(Philippines)	Kiesha Bedonia	Outside Hitter	1.67 m (5 ft 6 in)	December 29, 2002 (age 23)	Far Eastern
15	(Philippines)	Jessa Ordiales	Opposite Hitter	1.78 m (5 ft 10 in)	December 14, 2000 (age 25)	De La Salle
16	(Philippines)	Angelica Alcantara	Setter	1.63 m (5 ft 4 in)	November 25, 2000 (age 25)	Adamson
17	(Philippines)	Joan Monares	Outside Hitter	1.78 m (5 ft 10 in)	January 28, 2002 (age 24)	UP
18	(Philippines)	Jessey de Leon	Opposite Hitter	1.80 m (5 ft 11 in)	December 18, 1994 (age 31)	UST
19	(Philippines)	Jovie Prado	Outside Hitter	1.73 m (5 ft 8 in)	July 30, 1996 (age 30)	Arellano
22	(Philippines)	Leila Cruz	Opposite Hitter	1.85 m (6 ft 1 in)	February 17, 2000 (age 26)	De La Salle
Updated as of: August 13, 2026 | Source: PVL.ph

Coaching staff

- Head coach:
  Rald Ricafort
- Assistant coaches:
  Arnold Laniog
  Manolo Refugia Jr.
  Fritz Michael Santos
  Ervin James Peralta
- Strength & conditioning coach:
  Juan Paolo Escaño

Team staff

- Team manager:
  Christian Joy del Rosario
- Team coordinator:
  Francis Ramos

Medical staff

- Physical therapists:
  Kenneth Mary Jane Yam
  Nica Claire Ozoa

== Draft ==
Round	Pick	Player	Pos.	School
1	7	Fianne Ariola	S	UPHSD

The PLDT High Speed Hitters selected Fianne Ariola with the 7th pick overall before passing during the second round.

== PVL on Tour ==
=== Results summary ===
Team	Game		
Team	1	2	3
PLDT (HSH)	CMF; 3–1	ZUS; *Aug. 8	AKA; 3–1

Source: Premier Volleyball League
Legend: Blue = win; Red = loss

== Invitational Conference ==
The PLDT High Speed Hitters qualified for the Invitational Conference for reaching the semifinals of the All-Filipino Conference.

=== Preliminary round ===
==== Standings ====
Pos	Team	Pld	W	L	Pts	SW	SL	SR	SPW	SPL	SPR	Qualification
2	Nxled Chameleons	5	3	2	10	12	8	1.500	476	452	1.053	Finals
3	Creamline Cool Smashers	5	3	2	9	12	9	1.333	480	426	1.127	Third place match
4	PLDT High Speed Hitters	5	3	2	8	10	10	1.000	457	437	1.046	Third place match
5	Farm Fresh Foxies	5	1	4	4	7	13	0.538	426	455	0.936	Fifth place match
6	Ho Chi Minh City	5	1	4	3	5	13	0.385	373	447	0.834	Fifth place match

Source: Premier Volleyball League

==== Match log ====
2026 PVL Invitational Conference preliminary round match log
Total: 3–2 (8 points)
August: 1–0 (3 points)

Match	Date	Opponent	Sets	Total	Location Attendance	Record	Pts	Report
1	August 31, 2026	Est Cola	3–1	101–80	Smart Araneta Coliseum; 2,350	1–0	3	P2

September: 2–2 (5 points)

Match	Date	Opponent	Sets	Total	Location Attendance	Record	Pts	Report
2	September 1, 2026	Nxled	0–3	61–75	Smart Araneta Coliseum; 370	1–1	3	P2
3	September 3, 2026	Ho Chi Minh City	1–3	88–97	Smart Araneta Coliseum; 832	1–2	3	P2
4	September 4, 2026	Farm Fresh	3–1	98–83	Smart Araneta Coliseum; 397	2–2	6	P2
5	September 6, 2026	Creamline	3–2	109–102	Smart Araneta Coliseum; 4,081	3–2	8	P2

=== Final round ===
==== Match log ====
2026 PVL Invitational Conference final round match log
Total: 1–0 (3 points)
Third-place match: 1–0 (3 points)

Date	Opponent	Sets	Total	Location Attendance	Report
September 8, 2026	Creamline	3–1	95–88	Smart Araneta Coliseum; 1,575	P2

== All-Filipino Conference ==
=== Preliminary round ===
==== Standings ====
Pos	Team	Pld	W	L	Pts	SW	SL	SR	SPW	SPL	SPR	Qualification
3	Farm Fresh Foxies	7	5	2	14	19	13	1.462	703	680	1.034	Twice-to-win in semifinals
4	Creamline Cool Smashers	7	4	3	13	16	11	1.455	626	586	1.068	Twice-to-win in semifinals
5	PLDT High Speed Hitters	8	4	4	13	15	15	1.000	677	666	1.017	
6	Akari Chargers	8	3	5	9	14	19	0.737	724	745	0.972	
7	Capital1 Solar Spikers	8	3	5	7	13	21	0.619	720	761	0.946	

Updated to match(es) played on November 19, 2026. Source: Premier Volleyball League

==== Match log ====
2026–27 PVL All-Filipino Conference Siklab series preliminary round match log
Total: 4–4 (13 points)
October: 2–2 (6 points)

Match	Date	Opponent	Sets	Total	Location Attendance	Record	Pts	Report
1	October 13, 2026	Nxled	0–3	54–75	Smart Araneta Coliseum; 565	0–1	0	P2
2	October 20, 2026	Akari	0–3	59–75	SM Mall of Asia Arena; 647	0–2	0	P2
3	October 24, 2026	Capital1	3–1	96–88	Filoil Centre; 2,243	1–2	3	P2
4	October 29, 2026	Zus Coffee	3–0	75–54	Santiago City Sports Arena; 2,688	2–2	6	P2

November: 2–2 (7 points)

Match	Date	Opponent	Sets	Total	Location Attendance	Record	Pts	Report
5	November 5, 2026	Creamline	3–1	100–92	PhilSports Arena; 2,011	3–2	9	P2
6	November 10, 2026	Farm Fresh	2–3	102–110	Smart Araneta Coliseum; 194	3–3	10	P2
7	November 14, 2026	Galeries Tower	3–1	98–79	PhilSports Arena; 335	4–3	13	P2
8	November 19, 2026	Choco Mucho	1–3	93–93	SM Mall of Asia Arena; 2,340	4–4	13	P2

== Transactions ==
=== Additions ===
Player	Date signed	Previous team	Ref.
Maria Jessa Ordiales	June 2, 2026	Cignal Super Spikers	
Winnie Bedaña	June 10, 2026	Galeries Tower Highrisers	
Joan Monares	June 12, 2026	UP Diliman (UAAP)	
Fianne Ariola	July 7, 2026	Perpetual (NCAA)	
Leila Cruz	August 12, 2026	Capital1 Solar Spikers	

=== Subtractions ===
Player	New team	Ref.
Anj Legacion	Free agent	
Zenneth Perolino	Farm Fresh Foxies	
