= 2024–25 Premier Volleyball League All-Filipino Conference =

First conference of the 2024–25 PVL season

- Duration: November 9, 2024 – April 12, 2025
- Teams: 12
- Matches: 99
- Attendance: 251,739 (2,543 per match)
- TV partner(s): One Sports; One Sports+; RPTV
- Streaming partner(s): Pilipinas Live

Results
- Champions: Petro Gazz Angels
- Runners-up: Creamline Cool Smashers
- Third place: Akari Chargers
- Fourth place: Choco Mucho Flying Titans

Awards
- Conference MVP: Brooke Van Sickle
- Finals MVP: MJ Phillips
- Best OH: Savi Davison; Bernadeth Pons
- Best MB: Thea Gagate; Bea de Leon
- Best OPP: Trisha Tubu
- Best Setter: Kyle Negrito
- Best Libero: Thang Ponce

PVL All-Filipino Conference chronology
- < 2024 2026 >

PVL conference chronology
- < 2024 Invitational 2025 Invitational >
- 2025 PVL on Tour (preseason) >

The 2024–25 Premier Volleyball League All–Filipino Conference was the fourth and final conference of the 2024–25 Premier Volleyball League season. The ninth All-Filipino Conference featured twelve teams with no foreign guest players allowed.

This was the second All-Filipino Conference of the 2024–25 season. Previously, the league followed an annual cycle that lasted throughout the calendar year, but after this conference, the league would follow a June to May calendar to align with the FIVB calendar. As such, this conference is part of the transition from the old calendar to the new one. With a length of six months, it is the longest conference up to that point. Starting this tournament, referees from nearby countries would officiate semifinals and finals matches in a bid to mitigate bias.

Creamline Cool Smashers and Petro Gazz Angels as the top two teams of the preliminary round qualified for the 2025 AVC Women's Volleyball Champions League. The All-Filipino Conference was followed by the 2025 draft and the 2025 PVL on Tour which was billed as a preseason tournament.

== Participating teams ==
2024–25 Premier Volleyball League All-Filipino Conference
| Abbr. | Team | Affiliation | Head coach | Team captain |
|---|---|---|---|---|
| AKA | Akari Chargers | Akari Lighting & Technology | (Japan) Takayuki Minowa | Michelle Cobb |
| CAP | Capital1 Solar Spikers | CapitalOne Energy Corp. | (Philippines) Roger Gorayeb | Jorelle Singh |
| CTC | Chery Tiggo Crossovers | United Asia Automotive Group | (Philippines) Norman Miguel | Aby Maraño |
| CMF | Choco Mucho Flying Titans | Republic Biscuit Corporation | (Philippines) Dante Alinsunurin | Sisi Rondina |
| CHD | Cignal HD Spikers | Cignal TV, Inc. | (Philippines) Shaq Delos Santos | Dawn Macandili-Catindig |
| CCS | Creamline Cool Smashers | Republic Biscuit Corporation | (Philippines) Sherwin Meneses | Alyssa Valdez |
| FFF | Farm Fresh Foxies | Farm Fresh Philippine International / Strong Group Athletics | (Philippines) Benson Bocboc | Louie Romero |
| GTH | Galeries Tower Highrisers | Grand Taipan Land Development | (Philippines) Lerma Giron | Alyssa Eroa |
| NXL | Nxled Chameleons | Akari Lighting & Technology | (Italy) Ettore Guidetti | Chiara Permentilla |
| PGA | Petro Gazz Angels | PetroGazz Ventures Phils. | (Japan) Koji Tsuzurabara | Remy Palma |
| HSH | PLDT High Speed Hitters | PLDT Inc. | (Philippines) Rald Ricafort | Kath Arado |
| ZUS | Zus Coffee Thunderbelles | Zuspresso Sdn. Bhd. / Strong Group Athletics | (Philippines) Jerry Yee | Cloanne Mondoñedo |

== Venues ==
Regular venues

| All rounds | Preliminaries, Semifinals, Finals | Preliminaries | |
| Pasig | Quezon City | San Juan, Metro Manila | Manila |
|---|---|---|---|
| PhilSports Arena | Araneta Coliseum | Filoil EcoOil Centre | Ninoy Aquino Stadium |
| Capacity: 10,000 | Capacity: 20,000 | Capacity: 6,000 | Capacity: 6,000 |

PVL on Tour venues

| Preliminaries, Quarterfinals, Semifinals | Preliminaries | | |
| Antipolo | Candon | Passi | Minglanilla |
|---|---|---|---|
| Ynares Center | Candon City Arena | City of Passi Arena | Minglanilla Sports Complex |
| Capacity: 7,400 | Capacity: 8,000 | Capacity: 2,000 | Capacity: 4,000 |

== Transactions ==
=== Team additions and transfers ===
The following are the players who transferred to another team for the upcoming conference.

| Player | Moving from | Moving to | Ref. |
|---|---|---|---|
| Trisha Genesis | Nxled Chameleons | Capital1 Solar Spikers | |
| Jules Samonte | PLDT High Speed Hitters | Chery Tiggo Crossovers | |
| Mary Grace Vernaiz | UST Golden Tigresses (UAAP) | Chery Tiggo Crossovers | |
| Anngela Nunag | Cignal HD Spikers | Chery Tiggo Crossovers | |
| Risa Sato | Creamline Cool Smashers | Chery Tiggo Crossovers | |
| Camille Belaro | Lyceum Lady Pirates (NCAA) | Cignal HD Spikers | |
| Buding Duremdes | Chery Tiggo Crossovers | Cignal HD Spikers | |
| Caroline Santos | De La Salle Lady Spikers (UAAP) | Cignal HD Spikers | |
| Chamberlaine Cuñada | San Juan Lady Knights (MPVA) | Cignal HD Spikers | |
| Aj Jingco | Cignal HD Spikers | Farm Fresh Foxies | |
| Angelique Dionela | Cignal HD Spikers | Farm Fresh Foxies | |
| Rachel Daquis | Cignal HD Spikers | Farm Fresh Foxies | |
| Sarah Jane Gonzales | Army–Black Mamba Lady Troopers | Farm Fresh Foxies | |
| Jhoanna Maraguinot | Nxled Chameleons | Galeries Tower Highrisers | |
| Ennajie Laure | Chery Tiggo Crossovers | Nxled Chameleons | |
| Ivy Perez | Petro Gazz Angels | Nxled Chameleons | |
| Jaycel Delos Reyes | Zus Coffee Thunderbelles | Nxled Chameleons | |
| Angelica Legacion | Farm Fresh Foxies | PLDT High Speed Hitters | |
| Jovelyn Gonzaga | Cignal HD Spikers | Zus Coffee Thunderbelles | |
| Glaudine Troncoso | Cignal HD Spikers | Zus Coffee Thunderbelles | |
| Chinnie Pia Arroyo | Farm Fresh Foxies | Zus Coffee Thunderbelles | |
| Joan Narit | Farm Fresh Foxies | Zus Coffee Thunderbelles | |
| Kate Santiago | Farm Fresh Foxies | Zus Coffee Thunderbelles | |

=== Coaching changes ===
| Team | Outgoing coach | Manner of departure | Replaced by | Ref. |
|---|---|---|---|---|
| Chery Tiggo Crossovers | (Philippines) Kung Fu Reyes | Reassigned | (Philippines) Norman Miguel | |
| Farm Fresh Foxies | (Japan) Shota Sato | Replaced | (Philippines) Benson Bocboc | |
| Nxled Chameleons | (China) Chen Gang | Replaced | (Italy) Ettore Guidetti | |

== Format ==
The following format will be conducted for the entirety of the conference:

Preliminary round

- The twelve teams will compete in a single round-robin format.
- Teams are ranked using the FIVB Ranking System.
- Teams are then paired according to their final ranking for the qualifying round.

Qualifying round

- QR1: #1 vs #12
- QR2: #2 vs #11
- QR3: #3 vs #10
- QR4: #4 vs #9
- QR5: #5 vs #8
- QR6: #6 vs #7
- Winners will advance to the quarterfinals.
- Losers will drop to the play-in tournament to determine the last two quarterfinal slots.

Play-in tournament

- Single round-robin format; two pools.
- Teams are ranked according to their preliminary standings and grouped using the serpentine system.
- Pool A: #7, #10, and #11 QR losers.
- Pool B: #8, #9, and #12 QR losers.
- Teams are ranked using the FIVB Ranking System.
- Pool A winner will advance to the 7th-ranked slot.
- Pool B winner will advance to the 8th-ranked slot.
- Eliminated teams will be ranked according to their preliminary standings (9th–12th places).

Quarterfinals

- Best-of-three series.
- QF1: #1 (QR1 winner) vs #8 (Pool B winner)
- QF2: #2 (QR2 winner) vs #7 (Pool A winner)
- QF3: #3 (QR3 winner) vs #6 (QR6 winner)
- QF4: #4 (QR4 winner) vs #5 (QR5 winner)
- Winners proceed to the semifinals.
- Eliminated teams will be ranked according to their preliminary standings (5th–8th places).

Semifinals

- The four teams play again in a single round-robin elimination.
- Teams are ranked using the FIVB Ranking System.
- The 3rd and 4th ranked teams are relegated to the bronze medal match.
- The 1st and 2nd ranked teams are advanced to the gold medal match.
- In case of a tie at no. 2, a do-or-die match will commence to determine the 2nd-ranked team.
  - In case of a triple tie for Rank 1, the best record shall advance to the finals, and the remaining two teams will play for the 2nd-seed play-off.
  - In case of a triple tie for Rank 2, the two best records shall play for the 2nd-seed playoff, and the worst record will be relegated to the battle for bronze.

Finals

- Best-of-three series.
- Bronze medal: SF Rank 3 vs SF Rank 4
- Gold medal: SF Rank 1 vs SF Rank 2

== Pool standing procedure ==
- First, teams are ranked by the number of matches won.
- If the number of matches won is tied, the tied teams are then ranked by match points, wherein:
  - Match won 3–0 or 3–1: 3 match points for the winner, 0 match points for the loser.
  - Match won 3–2: 2 match points for the winner, 1 match point for the loser.
- In case of any further ties, the following criteria shall be used:
  - Set ratio: the number of sets won divided by number of sets lost.
  - Point ratio: number of points scored divided by number of points allowed.
  - Head-to-head standings: any remaining tied teams are ranked based on the results of head-to-head matches involving the teams in question.

== Preliminary round ==
=== Ranking ===
| Pos | Team | Pld | W | L | Pts | SW | SL | SR | SPW | SPL | SPR | Qualification |
|---|---|---|---|---|---|---|---|---|---|---|---|---|
| 1 | Creamline Cool Smashers | 11 | 10 | 1 | 29 | 32 | 8 | 4.000 | 970 | 816 | 1.189 | 2025 AVC Women's Champions League and Qualifying round |
| 2 | Petro Gazz Angels | 11 | 10 | 1 | 29 | 30 | 8 | 3.750 | 909 | 770 | 1.181 | 2025 AVC Women's Champions League and Qualifying round |
| 3 | Cignal HD Spikers | 11 | 8 | 3 | 25 | 27 | 12 | 2.250 | 909 | 794 | 1.145 | Qualifying round |
| 4 | PLDT High Speed Hitters | 11 | 8 | 3 | 23 | 27 | 13 | 2.077 | 927 | 842 | 1.101 | Qualifying round |
| 5 | Choco Mucho Flying Titans | 11 | 8 | 3 | 20 | 27 | 20 | 1.350 | 1064 | 1031 | 1.032 | Qualifying round |
| 6 | Farm Fresh Foxies | 11 | 5 | 6 | 15 | 18 | 22 | 0.818 | 847 | 915 | 0.926 | Qualifying round |
| 7 | Akari Chargers | 11 | 5 | 6 | 15 | 16 | 22 | 0.727 | 844 | 868 | 0.972 | Qualifying round |
| 8 | Chery Tiggo Crossovers | 11 | 5 | 6 | 14 | 20 | 24 | 0.833 | 957 | 966 | 0.991 | Qualifying round |
| 9 | Zus Coffee Thunderbelles | 11 | 4 | 7 | 14 | 20 | 23 | 0.870 | 958 | 962 | 0.996 | Qualifying round |
| 10 | Galeries Tower Highrisers | 11 | 1 | 10 | 5 | 10 | 30 | 0.333 | 835 | 949 | 0.880 | Qualifying round |
| 11 | Capital1 Solar Spikers | 11 | 1 | 10 | 5 | 8 | 31 | 0.258 | 754 | 926 | 0.814 | Qualifying round |
| 12 | Nxled Chameleons | 11 | 1 | 10 | 4 | 9 | 31 | 0.290 | 817 | 952 | 0.858 | Qualifying round |

Source: Premier Volleyball League

=== Match results ===
- All times are Philippine Standard Time (UTC+08:00).

| Date | Time | Venue | | Score | | Set 1 | Set 2 | Set 3 | Set 4 | Set 5 | Total | Report |
|---|---|---|---|---|---|---|---|---|---|---|---|---|
| Nov 09 | 16:00 | PSA | Galeries Tower Highrisers | 1–3 | Akari Chargers | 30–28 | 15–25 | 16–25 | 23–25 | | 84–103 | P2 |
| Nov 09 | 18:30 | PSA | Petro Gazz Angels | 3–1 | Choco Mucho Flying Titans | 25–20 | 26–28 | 25–21 | 25–16 | | 101–85 | P2 |
| Nov 12 | 16:00 | PSA | PLDT High Speed Hitters | 3–1 | Nxled Chameleons | 25–15 | 25–17 | 22–25 | 25–22 | | 97–79 | P2 |
| Nov 12 | 18:30 | PSA | Chery Tiggo Crossovers | 3–2 | Capital1 Solar Spikers | 20–25 | 25–23 | 22–25 | 25–18 | 15–11 | 107–102 | P2 |
| Nov 14 | 16:00 | FEC | Choco Mucho Flying Titans | 3–2 | Galeries Tower Highrisers | 27–29 | 25–20 | 25–19 | 17–25 | 15–12 | 109–105 | P2 |
| Nov 14 | 18:30 | FEC | Akari Chargers | 3–1 | Zus Coffee Thunderbelles | 25–14 | 25–21 | 19–25 | 25–23 | | 94–83 | P2 |
| Nov 16 | 16:00 | YCA | Farm Fresh Foxies | 0–3 | Cignal HD Spikers | 15–25 | 18–25 | 21–25 | | | 54–75 | P2 |
| Nov 16 | 18:30 | YCA | Creamline Cool Smashers | 3–0 | Petro Gazz Angels | 25–19 | 25–22 | 25–16 | | | 75–57 | P2 |
| Nov 19 | 16:00 | YCA | Zus Coffee Thunderbelles | 3–1 | Nxled Chameleons | 19–25 | 25–23 | 25–22 | 25–15 | | 94–85 | P2 |
| Nov 19 | 18:30 | YCA | Galeries Tower Highrisers | 0–3 | PLDT High Speed Hitters | 25–27 | 22–25 | 23–25 | | | 70–77 | P2 |
| Nov 21 | 16:00 | FEC | Cignal HD Spikers | 3–1 | Chery Tiggo Crossovers | 25–19 | 20–25 | 25–18 | 25–21 | | 95–83 | P2 |
| Nov 21 | 18:30 | FEC | Capital1 Solar Spikers | 1–3 | Choco Mucho Flying Titans | 20–25 | 24–26 | 28–26 | 9–25 | | 81–102 | P2 |
| Nov 23 | 16:00 | CCA | Petro Gazz Angels | 3–0 | Farm Fresh Foxies | 25–21 | 25–17 | 25–19 | | | 75–57 | P2 |
| Nov 23 | 18:30 | CCA | Akari Chargers | 0–3 | Creamline Cool Smashers | 24–26 | 17–25 | 16–25 | | | 57–76 | P2 |
| Nov 26 | 16:00 | PSA | PLDT High Speed Hitters | 3–0 | Capital1 Solar Spikers | 25–17 | 25–20 | 25–17 | | | 75–54 | P2 |
| Nov 26 | 18:30 | PSA | Chery Tiggo Crossovers | 3–0 | Nxled Chameleons | 26–24 | 25–15 | 25–18 | | | 76–57 | P2 |
| Nov 28 | 16:00 | PSA | Zus Coffee Thunderbelles | 3–0 | Galeries Tower Highrisers | 25–22 | 25–16 | 25–19 | | | 75–57 | P2 |
| Nov 28 | 18:30 | PSA | Choco Mucho Flying Titans | 1–3 | Cignal HD Spikers | 18–25 | 18–25 | 25–20 | 22–25 | | 83–95 | P2 |
| Nov 30 | 16:00 | PSA | Nxled Chameleons | 1–3 | Capital1 Solar Spikers | 25–21 | 21–25 | 15–25 | 18–25 | | 79–96 | P2 |
| Nov 30 | 18:30 | PSA | Akari Chargers | 0–3 | Farm Fresh Foxies | 23–25 | 21–25 | 14–25 | | | 58–75 | P2 |
| Dec 03 | 16:00 | SAC | PLDT High Speed Hitters | 1–3 | Chery Tiggo Crossovers | 12–25 | 23–25 | 25–20 | 22–25 | | 82–95 | P2 |
| Dec 03 | 18:30 | SAC | Choco Mucho Flying Titans | 1–3 | Creamline Cool Smashers | 22–25 | 20–25 | 32–30 | 20–25 | | 94–105 | P2 |
| Dec 05 | 16:00 | SAC | Farm Fresh Foxies | 3–1 | Zus Coffee Thunderbelles | 26–24 | 13–25 | 25–21 | 25–19 | | 89–89 | P2 |
| Dec 05 | 18:30 | SAC | Petro Gazz Angels | 3–0 | Akari Chargers | 28–26 | 29–27 | 25–18 | | | 82–71 | P2 |
| Dec 07 | 16:00 | MSC | Nxled Chameleons | 0–3 | Cignal HD Spikers | 18–25 | 22–25 | 23–25 | | | 63–75 | P2 |
| Dec 07 | 18:30 | MSC | Capital1 Solar Spikers | 0–3 | Galeries Tower Highrisers | 24–26 | 14–25 | 23–25 | | | 61–76 | P2 |
| Dec 10 | 16:00 | PSA | Petro Gazz Angels | 3–1 | PLDT High Speed Hitters | 12–25 | 25–14 | 25–22 | 25–20 | | 87–81 | P2 |
| Dec 10 | 18:30 | PSA | Chery Tiggo Crossovers | 1–3 | Akari Chargers | 25–22 | 24–26 | 18–25 | 20–25 | | 87–98 | P2 |
| Dec 12 | 16:00 | PSA | Creamline Cool Smashers | 3–2 | Zus Coffee Thunderbelles | 25–22 | 28–30 | 26–24 | 17–25 | 15–13 | 111–114 | P2 |
| Dec 12 | 18:30 | PSA | Choco Mucho Flying Titans | 3–2 | Farm Fresh Foxies | 25–20 | 25–21 | 21–25 | 25–27 | 15–12 | 111–105 | P2 |
| Dec 14 | 16:00 | PSA | Galeries Tower Highrisers | 2–3 | Chery Tiggo Crossovers | 28–30 | 25–20 | 25–19 | 16–25 | 8–15 | 102–109 | P2 |
| Dec 14 | 18:30 | PSA | Cignal HD Spikers | 0–3 | Petro Gazz Angels | 19–25 | 21–25 | 18–25 | | | 58–75 | P2 |
| Jan 18 | 14:00 | PSA | Farm Fresh Foxies | 3–0 | Nxled Chameleons | 25–22 | 26–24 | 25–21 | | | 76–67 | P2 |
| Jan 18 | 16:00 | PSA | Zus Coffee Thunderbelles | 2–3 | Choco Mucho Flying Titans | 25–20 | 25–20 | 22–25 | 22–25 | 9–15 | 103–105 | P2 |
| Jan 18 | 18:30 | PSA | Akari Chargers | 0–3 | PLDT High Speed Hitters | 22–25 | 16–25 | 15–25 | | | 53–75 | P2 |
| Jan 21 | 14:00 | PSA | Galeries Tower Highrisers | 0–3 | Cignal HD Spikers | 17–25 | 20–25 | 19–25 | | | 56–75 | P2 |
| Jan 21 | 16:00 | PSA | Capital1 Solar Spikers | 0–3 | Creamline Cool Smashers | 19–25 | 19–25 | 18–25 | | | 56–75 | P2 |
| Jan 21 | 18:30 | PSA | Petro Gazz Angels | 3–2 | Chery Tiggo Crossovers | 20–25 | 20–25 | 25–23 | 25–15 | 15–7 | 105–95 | P2 |
| Jan 23 | 16:00 | PSA | Akari Chargers | 3–1 | Nxled Chameleons | 21–25 | 25–20 | 26–24 | 25–18 | | 97–87 | P2 |
| Jan 23 | 18:30 | PSA | Choco Mucho Flying Titans | 3–1 | PLDT High Speed Hitters | 21–25 | 25–22 | 25–18 | 25–18 | | 96–83 | P2 |
| Jan 25 | 16:00 | PSA | Farm Fresh Foxies | 1–3 | Chery Tiggo Crossovers | 25–21 | 14–25 | 17–25 | 20–25 | | 76–96 | P2 |
| Jan 25 | 18:30 | PSA | Zus Coffee Thunderbelles | 3–0 | Capital1 Solar Spikers | 31–29 | 25–15 | 25–15 | | | 81–59 | P2 |
| Jan 28 | 16:00 | PSA | Nxled Chameleons | 0–3 | Creamline Cool Smashers | 12–25 | 21–25 | 19–25 | | | 52–75 | P2 |
| Jan 28 | 18:30 | PSA | PLDT High Speed Hitters | 3–1 | Cignal HD Spikers | 25–20 | 25–21 | 20–25 | 25–22 | | 95–88 | P2 |
| Jan 30 | 16:00 | PSA | Chery Tiggo Crossovers | 1–3 | Zus Coffee Thunderbelles | 22–25 | 22–25 | 25–23 | 20–25 | | 89–98 | P2 |
| Jan 30 | 18:30 | PSA | Galeries Tower Highrisers | 1–3 | Farm Fresh Foxies | 26–28 | 25–17 | 19–25 | 17–25 | | 87–95 | P2 |
| Feb 01 | 16:00 | PSA | Capital1 Solar Spikers | 0–3 | Akari Chargers | 9–25 | 17–25 | 24–26 | | | 50–76 | P2 |
| Feb 01 | 18:30 | PSA | Cignal HD Spikers | 2–3 | Creamline Cool Smashers | 19–25 | 24–26 | 25–23 | 25–23 | 9–15 | 102–112 | P2 |
| Feb 04 | 16:00 | PSA | Farm Fresh Foxies | 0–3 | PLDT High Speed Hitters | 20–25 | 17–25 | 19–25 | | | 56–75 | P2 |
| Feb 04 | 18:30 | PSA | Zus Coffee Thunderbelles | 1–3 | Petro Gazz Angels | 20–25 | 26–24 | 26–28 | 20–25 | | 92–102 | P2 |
| Feb 06 | 16:00 | PSA | Creamline Cool Smashers | 3–0 | Chery Tiggo Crossovers | 25–17 | 25–17 | 25–21 | | | 75–55 | P2 |
| Feb 06 | 18:30 | PSA | Cignal HD Spikers | 3–0 | Capital1 Solar Spikers | 25–12 | 25–15 | 25–17 | | | 75–44 | P2 |
| Feb 08 | 16:00 | PSA | Nxled Chameleons | 3–1 | Galeries Tower Highrisers | 25–20 | 19–25 | 25–14 | 25–23 | | 94–82 | P2 |
| Feb 08 | 18:30 | PSA | Akari Chargers | 1–3 | Choco Mucho Flying Titans | 21–25 | 25–19 | 23–25 | 15–25 | | 84–94 | P2 |
| Feb 11 | 16:00 | PSA | Petro Gazz Angels | 3–0 | Capital1 Solar Spikers | 25–19 | 25–18 | 25–9 | | | 75–46 | P2 |
| Feb 11 | 18:30 | PSA | Creamline Cool Smashers | 3–0 | Farm Fresh Foxies | 25–15 | 25–19 | 27–25 | | | 77–59 | P2 |
| Feb 13 | 16:00 | NAS | Choco Mucho Flying Titans | 3–2 | Nxled Chameleons | 25–21 | 23–25 | 21–25 | 25–23 | 15–10 | 109–104 | P2 |
| Feb 13 | 18:30 | NAS | Cignal HD Spikers | 3–1 | Zus Coffee Thunderbelles | 25–18 | 25–22 | 21–25 | 25–11 | | 96–76 | P2 |
| Feb 15 | 16:00 | YCA | Galeries Tower Highrisers | 0–3 | Petro Gazz Angels | 18–25 | 18–25 | 18–25 | | | 54–75 | P2 |
| Feb 15 | 18:30 | YCA | PLDT High Speed Hitters | 3–2 | Creamline Cool Smashers | 30–28 | 25–21 | 23–25 | 18–25 | 16–14 | 112–113 | P2 |
| Feb 18 | 16:00 | PSA | Cignal HD Spikers | 3–0 | Akari Chargers | 25–17 | 25–15 | 25–21 | | | 75–53 | P2 |
| Feb 18 | 18:30 | PSA | Capital1 Solar Spikers | 2–3 | Farm Fresh Foxies | 25–18 | 25–21 | 24–26 | 19–25 | 12–15 | 105–105 | P2 |
| Feb 20 | 16:00 | PSA | Creamline Cool Smashers | 3–0 | Galeries Tower Highrisers | 25–15 | 26–24 | 25–19 | | | 76–58 | P2 |
| Feb 20 | 18:30 | PSA | Nxled Chameleons | 0–3 | Petro Gazz Angels | 19–25 | 14–25 | 17–25 | | | 50–75 | P2 |
| Feb 22 | 16:00 | PAS | Zus Coffee Thunderbelles | 0–3 | PLDT High Speed Hitters | 20–25 | 16–25 | 15–25 | | | 51–75 | P2 |
| Feb 22 | 18:30 | PAS | Chery Tiggo Crossovers | 0–3 | Choco Mucho Flying Titans | 18–25 | 23–25 | 24–26 | | | 65–76 | P2 |

== Qualifying round ==
- All times are Philippine Standard Time (UTC+08:00).

| Date | Time | Venue | | Score | | Set 1 | Set 2 | Set 3 | Set 4 | Set 5 | Total | Report |
Rank 3 vs. Rank 10
| Feb 27 | 16:00 | PSA | Cignal HD Spikers | 1–3 | Galeries Tower Highrisers | 17–25 | 22–25 | 25–19 | 19–25 | | 83–94 | P2 |
Rank 1 vs. Rank 12
| Feb 27 | 18:30 | PSA | Creamline Cool Smashers | 3–0 | Nxled Chameleons | 25–18 | 25–17 | 25–17 | | | 75–52 | P2 |
Rank 2 vs. Rank 11
| Mar 01 | 16:00 | PSA | Petro Gazz Angels | 3–0 | Capital1 Solar Spikers | 25–19 | 25–23 | 25–21 | | | 75–63 | P2 |
Rank 5 vs. Rank 8
| Mar 01 | 18:30 | PSA | Choco Mucho Flying Titans | 3–0 | Chery Tiggo Crossovers | 25–22 | 25–22 | 25–23 | | | 75–67 | P2 |
Rank 6 vs. Rank 7
| Mar 04 | 16:00 | PSA | Farm Fresh Foxies | 2–3 | Akari Chargers | 11–25 | 25–23 | 25–18 | 21–25 | 9–15 | 91–106 | P2 |
Rank 4 vs. Rank 9
| Mar 04 | 18:30 | PSA | PLDT High Speed Hitters | 3–1 | Zus Coffee Thunderbelles | 20–25 | 25–20 | 25–20 | 26–24 | | 96–89 | P2 |

== Play-in tournament ==
- All times are Philippine Standard Time (UTC+08:00).

=== Pool A ===
| Pos | Team | Pld | W | L | Pts | SW | SL | SR | SPW | SPL | SPR | Qualification |
|---|---|---|---|---|---|---|---|---|---|---|---|---|
| 1 | Zus Coffee Thunderbelles | 2 | 2 | 0 | 5 | 6 | 3 | 2.000 | 200 | 186 | 1.075 | Final round |
| 2 | Cignal HD Spikers | 2 | 1 | 1 | 4 | 5 | 4 | 1.250 | 202 | 185 | 1.092 | |
| 3 | Capital1 Solar Spikers | 2 | 0 | 2 | 0 | 2 | 6 | 0.333 | 159 | 190 | 0.837 | |

Source: Premier Volleyball League

| Date | Time | Venue | | Score | | Set 1 | Set 2 | Set 3 | Set 4 | Set 5 | Total | Report |
|---|---|---|---|---|---|---|---|---|---|---|---|---|
| Mar 06 | 18:30 | PSA | Capital1 Solar Spikers | 1–3 | Cignal HD Spikers | 21–25 | 25–22 | 17–25 | 15–25 | | 78–97 | P2 |
| Mar 11 | 18:30 | PSA | Zus Coffee Thunderbelles | 3–2 | Cignal HD Spikers | 19–25 | 25–23 | 25–20 | 23–25 | 15–12 | 107–105 | P2 |
| Mar 13 | 18:30 | PSA | Capital1 Solar Spikers | 1–3 | Zus Coffee Thunderbelles | 22–25 | 17–25 | 25–18 | 17–25 | | 81–93 | P2 |

=== Pool B ===
| Pos | Team | Pld | W | L | Pts | SW | SL | SR | SPW | SPL | SPR | Qualification |
|---|---|---|---|---|---|---|---|---|---|---|---|---|
| 1 | Chery Tiggo Crossovers | 2 | 2 | 0 | 6 | 6 | 1 | 6.000 | 170 | 153 | 1.111 | Final round |
| 2 | Nxled Chameleons | 2 | 1 | 1 | 3 | 3 | 3 | 1.000 | 133 | 128 | 1.039 | |
| 3 | Farm Fresh Foxies | 2 | 0 | 2 | 0 | 1 | 6 | 0.167 | 147 | 169 | 0.870 | |

Source: Premier Volleyball League

| Date | Time | Venue | | Score | | Set 1 | Set 2 | Set 3 | Set 4 | Set 5 | Total | Report |
|---|---|---|---|---|---|---|---|---|---|---|---|---|
| Mar 06 | 16:00 | PSA | Chery Tiggo Crossovers | 3–0 | Nxled Chameleons | 25–22 | 26–24 | 25–12 | | | 76–58 | P2 |
| Mar 11 | 16:00 | PSA | Farm Fresh Foxies | 1–3 | Chery Tiggo Crossovers | 27–29 | 25–15 | 22–25 | 21–25 | | 95–94 | P2 |
| Mar 13 | 16:00 | PSA | Nxled Chameleons | 3–0 | Farm Fresh Foxies | 25–17 | 25–17 | 25–18 | | | 75–52 | P2 |

== Final round ==
- All times are Philippine Standard Time (UTC+08:00).

=== Bracket ===
Quarterfinals
1 | Creamline | 2
8 | Chery Tiggo | 0
2 | Petro Gazz | 2
7 | Zus Coffee | 1
3 | Galeries Tower | 0
6 | Akari | 2
4 | PLDT | 0
5 | Choco Mucho | 2

Semifinals
Creamline | 6
Petro Gazz | 9
Choco Mucho | 1
Akari | 2

Finals
Championship
Creamline | 1
Petro Gazz | 2
Third-place
Choco Mucho | 1
Akari | 2

=== Quarterfinals ===
| Team 1 | Series | Team 2 | Game 1 | Game 2 | Game 3 |
|---|---|---|---|---|---|
| Creamline Cool Smashers | 2–0 | Chery Tiggo Crossovers | 3–0 | 3–1 | – |
| Petro Gazz Angels | 2–1 | Zus Coffee Thunderbelles | 0–3 | 3–0 | 3–0 |
| Galeries Tower Highrisers | 0–2 | Akari Chargers | 2–3 | 2–3 | – |
| PLDT High Speed Hitters | 0–2 | Choco Mucho Flying Titans | 2–3 | 2–3 | – |

| Date | Time | Venue | | Score | | Set 1 | Set 2 | Set 3 | Set 4 | Set 5 | Total | Report |
Game 1
| Mar 15 | 16:00 | PSA | Akari Chargers | 3–2 | Galeries Tower Highrisers | 21–25 | 25–19 | 20–25 | 25–16 | 15–11 | 106–96 | P2 |
| Mar 15 | 18:30 | PSA | Choco Mucho Flying Titans | 3–2 | PLDT High Speed Hitters | 20–25 | 19–25 | 25–15 | 25–20 | 18–16 | 107–101 | P2 |
| Mar 18 | 16:00 | PSA | Chery Tiggo Crossovers | 0–3 | Creamline Cool Smashers | 10–25 | 25–27 | 21–25 | | | 56–77 | P2 |
| Mar 18 | 18:30 | PSA | Zus Coffee Thunderbelles | 3–0 | Petro Gazz Angels | 25–21 | 25–23 | 27–25 | | | 77–69 | P2 |
Game 2
| Mar 20 | 16:00 | PSA | PLDT High Speed Hitters | 2–3 | Choco Mucho Flying Titans | 15–25 | 25–12 | 23–25 | 25–21 | 13–15 | 101–98 | P2 |
| Mar 20 | 18:30 | PSA | Galeries Tower Highrisers | 2–3 | Akari Chargers | 25–19 | 20–25 | 25–16 | 20–25 | 12–15 | 102–100 | P2 |
| Mar 22 | 16:00 | YCA | Petro Gazz Angels | 3–0 | Zus Coffee Thunderbelles | 25–19 | 25–13 | 28–26 | | | 78–58 | P2 |
| Mar 22 | 18:30 | YCA | Creamline Cool Smashers | 3–1 | Chery Tiggo Crossovers | 20–25 | 25–21 | 25–22 | 25–22 | | 95–90 | P2 |
Game 3
| Mar 25 | 18:00 | PSA | Zus Coffee Thunderbelles | 0–3 | Petro Gazz Angels | 21–25 | 19–25 | 23–25 | | | 63–75 | P2 |

=== Semifinals ===
| Pos | Team | Pld | W | L | Pts | SW | SL | SR | SPW | SPL | SPR | Qualification |
|---|---|---|---|---|---|---|---|---|---|---|---|---|
| 1 | Petro Gazz Angels | 3 | 3 | 0 | 9 | 9 | 2 | 4.500 | 272 | 232 | 1.172 | Championship |
| 2 | Creamline Cool Smashers | 3 | 2 | 1 | 6 | 7 | 3 | 2.333 | 236 | 201 | 1.174 | Championship |
| 3 | Akari Chargers | 3 | 1 | 2 | 2 | 3 | 8 | 0.375 | 224 | 256 | 0.875 | 3rd place |
| 4 | Choco Mucho Flying Titans | 3 | 0 | 3 | 1 | 3 | 9 | 0.333 | 241 | 284 | 0.849 | 3rd place |

Source: Premier Volleyball League

| Date | Time | Venue | | Score | | Set 1 | Set 2 | Set 3 | Set 4 | Set 5 | Total | Report |
|---|---|---|---|---|---|---|---|---|---|---|---|---|
| Mar 29 | 16:00 | YCA | Akari Chargers | 3–2 | Choco Mucho Flying Titans | 20–25 | 25–19 | 25–23 | 22–25 | 16–14 | 108–106 | P2 |
| Mar 29 | 18:30 | YCA | Creamline Cool Smashers | 1–3 | Petro Gazz Angels | 23–25 | 22–25 | 25–21 | 16–25 | | 86–96 | P2 |
| Apr 01 | 16:00 | PSA | Creamline Cool Smashers | 3–0 | Akari Chargers | 25–18 | 25–19 | 25–19 | | | 75–56 | P2 |
| Apr 01 | 18:30 | PSA | Petro Gazz Angels | 3–1 | Choco Mucho Flying Titans | 24–26 | 25–18 | 25–17 | 27–25 | | 101–86 | P2 |
| Apr 03 | 16:00 | SAC | Akari Chargers | 0–3 | Petro Gazz Angels | 22–25 | 20–25 | 18–25 | | | 60–75 | P2 |
| Apr 03 | 18:30 | SAC | Choco Mucho Flying Titans | 0–3 | Creamline Cool Smashers | 19–25 | 15–25 | 15–25 | | | 49–75 | P2 |

=== Finals ===
==== 3rd place ====
- Akari wins third place, 2–1

| Date | Time | Venue | | Score | | Set 1 | Set 2 | Set 3 | Set 4 | Set 5 | Total | Report |
|---|---|---|---|---|---|---|---|---|---|---|---|---|
| Apr 08 | 16:00 | SAC | Akari Chargers | 3–2 | Choco Mucho Flying Titans | 24–26 | 21–25 | 25–15 | 25–18 | 15–11 | 110–95 | P2 |
| Apr 10 | 16:00 | SAC | Choco Mucho Flying Titans | 3–1 | Akari Chargers | 25–18 | 25–22 | 27–29 | 25–19 | | 102–88 | P2 |
| Apr 12 | 15:00 | PSA | Akari Chargers | 3–0 | Choco Mucho Flying Titans | 25–15 | 26–24 | 26–24 | | | 77–63 | P2 |

==== Championship ====
- Petro Gazz wins the championship, 2–1

| Date | Time | Venue | | Score | | Set 1 | Set 2 | Set 3 | Set 4 | Set 5 | Total | Report |
|---|---|---|---|---|---|---|---|---|---|---|---|---|
| Apr 08 | 18:30 | SAC | Creamline Cool Smashers | 2–3 | Petro Gazz Angels | 17–25 | 20–25 | 25–18 | 25–20 | 10–15 | 97–103 | P2 |
| Apr 10 | 18:30 | SAC | Petro Gazz Angels | 2–3 | Creamline Cool Smashers | 15–25 | 25–16 | 21–25 | 25–15 | 9–15 | 95–96 | P2 |
| Apr 12 | 19:00 | PSA | Creamline Cool Smashers | 1–3 | Petro Gazz Angels | 21–25 | 16–25 | 25–23 | 19–25 | | 81–98 | P2 |

== Final standing ==
| Rank | Team |
|---|---|
| 1st place, gold medalist(s) | Petro Gazz Angels |
| 2nd place, silver medalist(s) | Creamline Cool Smashers |
| 3rd place, bronze medalist(s) | Akari Chargers |
| 4 | Choco Mucho Flying Titans |
| 5 | PLDT High Speed Hitters |
| 6 | Chery Tiggo Crossovers |
| 7 | Zus Coffee Thunderbelles |
| 8 | Galeries Tower Highrisers |
| 9 | Cignal HD Spikers |
| 10 | Farm Fresh Foxies |
| 11 | Capital1 Solar Spikers |
| 12 | Nxled Chameleons |

| Qualified for the 2025 AVC Women's Volleyball Champions League |
| Wild card for the 2025 AVC Women's Volleyball Champions League |

2024–25 PVL All-Filipino champions
Petro Gazz Angels
Third title

Team roster
Remy Palma (c), Antoinette Adolfo, Donnalyn Paralejas, Joy Dacoron, Ethan Arce, Djanel Cheng, Jellie Tempiatura, Aiza Maizo-Pontillas, Brooke Van Sickle, Kecelyn Galdones, MJ Phillips, Michelle Morente, Myla Pablo, Ranya Musa, Chie Saet, Nicole Tiamzon, Jonah Sabete, Babylove Barbom
Head coach
Koji Tsuzurabara

== Qualification for the AVC Volleyball Champions League ==
The champions of this conference was originally intended to represent the Philippines in the 2025 AVC Women's Volleyball Champions League, formerly known as the Asian Women's Club Volleyball Championship. Sports Vision will sponsor the team's participation after previous failed attempts of sending the top teams in previous iterations due to a lack of finances from team owners or players' injuries. On March 1, the league announced that Creamline and Petro Gazz, the leaders in the preliminary round are set to represent the Philippines in the Champions League, as the drawing of lots are set to commence way before the conference ends. At the day of the drawing of lots, the league announced that PLDT High Speed Hitters will also suit up in the Champions League after the Asian Volleyball Confederation granted the host nation another berth.

== Awards and medalists ==
=== Awards ===
Individual awards

| Award | Player | Team | Ref. |
|---|---|---|---|
| Conference Most Valuable Player | Brooke Van Sickle | Petro Gazz | |
| Finals Most Valuable Player | MJ Phillips | Petro Gazz | |
| Rookie of the Conference | Ishie Lalongisip | Cignal | |
| 1st Best Outside Spiker | Savi Davison | PLDT | |
| 2nd Best Outside Spiker | Bernadeth Pons | Creamline | |
| 1st Best Middle Blocker | Thea Gagate | Zus Coffee | |
| 2nd Best Middle Blocker | Bea De Leon | Creamline | |
| Best Opposite Spiker | Trisha Tubu | Farm Fresh | |
| Best Setter | Kyle Negrito | Creamline | |
| Best Libero | Thang Ponce | Choco Mucho | |

=== Medalists ===
| Gold | Silver | Bronze |
| Petro Gazz Angels: Remy Palma (c); Antoinette Adolfo; Donnalyn Paralejas; Joy Dacoron; Ethan Arce; Djanel Cheng; Jellie Tempiatura (L); Aiza Maizo-Pontillas; Brooke Van Sickle; Kecelyn Galdones; MJ Phillips; Michelle Morente; Myla Pablo; Ranya Musa; Chie Saet; Nicole Tiamzon; Jonah Sabete; Babylove Barbom (L) | Creamline Cool Smashers: Alyssa Valdez (c); Kyle Negrito; Floremel Rodriguez; Jeanette Panaga; Michele Gumabao; Ella de Jesus; Lorie Bernardo; Pau Soriano; Kyla Atienza (L); Denden Lazaro-Revilla (L); Bea De Leon; Theo Bea Bonafe; Rizza Mandapat; Rosemarie Vargas; Jema Galanza; Bernadeth Pons; Mafe Galanza; Tots Carlos; Aleiah Torres | Akari Chargers: Michelle Cobb (c); Dani Ravena (L); Max Juangco (L); Ylizyeth Justine Jazareno (L); Grethcel Soltones; Camille Victoria; Janine Marciano; Ezra Madrigal; Erika Raagas; Ysabela Bakabak; Celine Domingo; Fifi Sharma; Cathrine Almazan; Stephanie Bustrillo; Ivy Lacsina; Faith Nisperos; Kamille Cal; Eli Soyud |
| Head coach: Koji Tsuzurabara | Head coach: Sherwin Meneses | Head coach: Takayuki Minowa |

== Statistics leaders ==
Statistics leaders correct at the end of the qualifying round.

Best Scorers
| Rank | Name | Points |
|---|---|---|
| 1 | Savi Davison | 296 |
| 2 | Sisi Rondina | 258 |
| 3 | Brooke Van Sickle | 232 |
| 4 | Trisha Tubu | 205 |
| 5 | Ivy Lacsina | 178 |

Best Spikers
| Rank | Name | %Succ |
|---|---|---|
| 1 | Savi Davison | 39.35 |
| 2 | Brooke Van Sickle | 37.60 |
| 3 | Trisha Tubu | 36.65 |
| 4 | Erika Mae Santos | 34.74 |
| 5 | Bernadeth Pons | 34.35 |

Best Blockers
| Rank | Name | Avg |
|---|---|---|
| 1 | Bea De Leon | 0.72 |
| 2 | Thea Gagate | 0.70 |
| 3 | Majoy Baron | 0.66 |
| 4 | Roselle Baliton | 0.57 |
| 4 | Savi Davison | 0.57 |
| 4 | Dell Palomata | 0.57 |

Best Servers
| Rank | Name | Avg |
|---|---|---|
| 1 | Brooke Van Sickle | 0.46 |
| 2 | Gel Cayuna | 0.30 |
| 2 | Jaila Atienza | 0.30 |
| 4 | Alyssa Bertolano | 0.29 |
| 5 | Vanie Gandler | 0.28 |
| 5 | Cloanne Mondoñedo | 0.28 |
| 5 | Jema Galanza | 0.28 |

Best Diggers
| Rank | Name | Avg |
|---|---|---|
| 1 | Dawn Macandili-Catindig | 5.14 |
| 2 | Alyssa Eroa | 4.52 |
| 3 | Kath Arado | 4.36 |
| 4 | Thang Ponce | 3.54 |
| 5 | Roma Mae Doromal | 3.40 |

Best Setters
| Rank | Name | Avg |
|---|---|---|
| 1 | Gel Cayuna | 4.60 |
| 2 | Kyle Negrito | 4.51 |
| 3 | Louie Romero | 3.96 |
| 4 | Cloanne Mondoñedo | 3.77 |
| 5 | Angelica Alcantara | 3.25 |

Best Receivers
| Rank | Name | %Eff |
|---|---|---|
| 1 | Thang Ponce | 40.15 |
| 2 | Baby Love Barbon | 35.09 |
| 3 | Jema Galanza | 30.74 |
| 4 | Brooke Van Sickle | 29.67 |
| 5 | Savi Davison | 27.98 |

== PVLPC Player of the Week ==
| Week | Player | Team | Ref. |
|---|---|---|---|
| November 9–16 | Ivy Lacsina | Akari Chargers | |
| November 19–23 | Jovelyn Gonzaga | Zus Coffee Thunderbelles | |
| November 26–30 | Trisha Tubu | Farm Fresh Foxies | |
| December 3–7 | Jema Galanza | Creamline Cool Smashers | |
| December 10–14 | Myla Pablo | Petro Gazz Angels | |
| January 18–25 | Dindin Santiago-Manabat | Choco Mucho Flying Titans | |
| January 28–February 1 | Bernadeth Pons | Creamline Cool Smashers | |
| February 4–8 | Ishie Lalongisip | Cignal HD Spikers | |
| February 11–15 | Savi Davison | PLDT High Speed Hitters | |
| February 18–22 | Rachel Daquis | Farm Fresh Foxies | |
| February 27–March 1 | Ysabel Jimenez | Galeries Tower Highrisers | |
| March 4–6 | Savi Davison | PLDT High Speed Hitters | |
| March 11–15 | Cloanne Mondoñedo | Zus Coffee Thunderbelles | |
| March 18–22 | Marionne Alba | Choco Mucho Flying Titans | |
| March 25–29 | Eli Soyud | Akari Chargers | |
| April 1–3 | Myla Pablo | Petro Gazz Angels | |

== Broadcast notes ==
One Sports is the official broadcaster of the 2024–25 Premier Volleyball League All-Filipino Conference games.

| Game | Play-by-play | Analyst | Courtside Reporter |
|---|---|---|---|
| Semifinals AKA vs. CMF | Billie Capistrano | Jamie Lavitoria | Janna Ehido |
| Semifinals CCS vs. PGA | Dyp Dypiangco | Neil Flores | Alexis Tinsay |
| Semifinals AKA vs. CCS | Chiqui Roa-Puno | Fille Cayetano | Kylla Castillo |
| Semifinals CMF vs. PGA | Sev Sarmenta | Stephanie Mercado | Sam Corrales |
| Semifinals PGA vs. AKA | Jaime Ascalon | Noreen Go | Kyla Kingsu |
| Semifinals CCS vs. CMF | Billie Capistrano | Neil Flores | Janna Ehido |
| Battle for Bronze Game 1 | Billie Capistrano | Ayel Estrañero | Lexi Rodriguez |
| Finals Game 1 | Sev Sarmenta | Fille Cayetano | Kylla Castillo |
| Battle for Bronze Game 2 | Chiqui Roa-Puno | Jamie Lavitoria | Kyla Kingsu |
| Finals Game 2 | Boom Gonzalez | Neil Flores | Frannie Reyes |
| Battle for Bronze Game 3 | Synjin Reyes | Stephanie Mercado | Sam Corrales |
| Finals Game 3 | Boom Gonzalez | Neil Flores | Lexi Rodriguez |

== See also ==
- 2025 Spikers' Turf Open Conference
