= 2004 Shakey's V-League 2nd Conference =

1st Season 2nd Conference
- League: Shakey's V-League
- Sport: Volleyball
- Duration: Nov. 28, 2004 – Feb. 14, 2005
- Teams: 7
- Season MVP: Michelle Carolino
- Top scorer: Cherry Rose Macatangay
- Finals champions: De La Salle Lady Archers
- Runners-up: UST Growling Tigresses

Seasons
- ← 2004 2005 →

The 2004 Shakey's V-League 2nd Conference was the second conference of the Shakey's V-League in its inaugural season. The tournament was held from November 28, 2004 until the final game on February 14, 2005.

== Tournament Format ==
- Double Round Robin Tournament
- Top four teams will compete in the semi-finals
- Semi-Finals is a best of three series with the format, 1 vs 4 and 2 vs 3
- Best of Three Championship series

=== Eliminations ===
1ST ROUND
TIME	November 28 - Philsports Arena						
TIME	Team	1st	2nd	3rd	4th	5th	Best Player
1 PM	UST Tigresses	23	25	29	30	15	Roxanne Pimentel of UST
1 PM	La Salle Lady Archers	25	22	27	32	13	Roxanne Pimentel of UST
3 PM	PSC Lady Legends	25	26	25	-	-	Theresa de la Rosa of PSC
3 PM	Lyceum Lady Pirates	21	24	17	-	-	Theresa de la Rosa of PSC
TIME	November 30 - Philsports Arena						
TIME	Team	1st	2nd	3rd	4th	5th	Best Player
3 PM	PSC Lady Legends	25	25	25	-	-	Amelia Guanco of PSC
3 PM	San Sebastian Lady Stags	17	16	19	-	-	Amelia Guanco of PSC
5 PM	Letran Lady Knights	25	21	25	25	-	Cherry Rose Macatangay of Letran
5 PM	FEU Lady Tamaraws	20	25	17	19	-	Cherry Rose Macatangay of Letran
TIME	December 2 - Ninoy Aquino Stadium						
TIME	Team	1st	2nd	3rd	4th	5th	Best Player
3 PM	Lyceum Lady Pirates	25	22	25	25	-	Michelle Laborte of Lyceum
3 PM	FEU Lady Tamaraws	19	25	23	22	-	Michelle Laborte of Lyceum
5 PM	UST Tigresses	25	19	25	21	15	Kaye Co Yu Kang of UST
5 PM	PSC Lady Legends	22	25	21	25	9	Kaye Co Yu Kang of UST

=== Final standings ===
Rank	Team	Ref.
1st place, gold medalist(s)	De La Salle University	
2nd place, silver medalist(s)	UST Growling Tigresses	
3rd place, bronze medalist(s)	Letran Lady Knights	
4	(Philippines) PSC Lady Legends	
5	Lyceum Lady Pirates	
6	FEU Lady Tamaraws	
7	San Sebastian Lady Stags	

=== Individual awards ===
Award	Name	Team	Ref.
Most Valuable Player	Michelle Carolino	De La Salle Lady Archers	
Best Scorer	Cherry Rose Macatangay	Letran Lady Knights	
Best Attacker	Roxanne Pimentel	UST Growling Tigresses	
Best Blocker	Maureen Penetrante	De La Salle Lady Archers	
Best Server	Rubie De Leon	UST Growling Tigresses	
Best Setter	Relea Ferina Saet	De La Salle Lady Archers	
Best Digger	Sharmaine Miles Peñano	De La Salle Lady Archers	
Best Receiver	Mary Jean Balse	UST Growling Tigresses	

Preceded by	Shakey's V-League; 2004	Succeeded by 2005
