= PLDT High Speed Hitters =

Professional women's volleyball team

- 2026–27 PLDT High Speed Hitters season
- Short name: PLDT
- Nickname: High Speed Hitters
- Founded: 2018
- History: Smart Prepaid Giga Hitters; 2018; Smart–Army Giga Hitters; 2018; Smart Giga Hitters; 2018; PLDT Home Fibr Power Hitters; 2019–2021; PLDT Home Fibr Hitters; 2020; PLDT High Speed Hitters; 2022–present
- Head coach: Rald Ricafort
- Captain: Kath Arado
- League: Philippine Super Liga (2018–2020); Premier Volleyball League (2021–present)
- 2026 Invitational: 3rd place
- Championships: 2; 2025 PVL on Tour; 2025 Invitational

Uniforms
Home	Away

The PLDT High Speed Hitters are a Philippine professional women's volleyball team owned by PLDT. The team competes in the Premier Volleyball League (PVL), where they have been a member of since 2021, and previously took part in the Philippine Super Liga (PSL) from 2018 to 2020.

The team was originally known as the Smart Giga Hitters when they began play in the 2018 PSL Grand Prix. Later that year, their sister team in the PVL, the PayMaya High Flyers (who themselves previously competed in the PSL under the PLDT banner), was merged into this team, prompting a name change to the PLDT Home Hibr Power Hitters in 2019. In 2021, they, alongside Cignal, moved to the PVL as part of Cignal TV's broadcast partnership with the league. In 2022, the team rebranded once more, this time to their current moniker.

Until 2025, despite consistently finishing in the top six, the team was only able to reach the podium once, which came in the 2019 PSL Grand Prix. Their streak of middling results came to an end when the new PLDT franchise won back-to-back championships in 2025 with the core of Majoy Baron, Kath Arado, Mika Reyes, and Savi Davison. They became one of three teams to win multiple titles in the PVL after the Creamline Cool Smashers and Petro Gazz Angels.

The PLDT franchise was also the sister team to the Cignal HD Spikers until 2026.

== History ==
The team debuted in 2018 as the Smart Prepaid Giga Hitters. The team was owned by Smart Communications.

For the 2018 PSL Invitational Cup, the team partnered with the Philippine Army Lady Troopers and competed as the Smart–Army Giga Hitters.

In September 2018, the PayMaya High Flyers, their affiliate team in the Premier Volleyball League (PVL), was merged with the team. In February 2019, the Smart Prepaid Giga Hitters changed its name to the PLDT Home Fibr Power Hitters.

The team transferred to the PVL in February 2021, following the league's professionalization. The team changed their name to the High Speed Hitters in January 2022, in a lead up to the upcoming PVL season.

PLDT won the 2025 PVL on Tour tournament, its first ever league title. They followed it by winning the 2025 Invitational Conference defeating Japanese guest team Kobe Shinwa University in the final.

== Current roster ==
PLDT High Speed Hitters roster
No.	Nat.	Player	Pos.	Height	DOB	From
1	(Philippines)	Nieza Viray	Libero	1.65 m (5 ft 5 in)	February 12, 1999 (age 27)	San Beda
2	(Philippines)	Shiela Kiseo	Outside Hitter	1.67 m (5 ft 6 in)	October 20, 2000 (age 25)	Far Eastern
3	(Philippines)	Mika Reyes	Middle Blocker	1.83 m (6 ft 0 in)	June 21, 1994 (age 32)	De La Salle
4	(Philippines)	Winnie Bedaña	Middle Blocker	1.70 m (5 ft 7 in)	March 20, 2001 (age 25)	UPHSD
5	(Philippines)	Alleiah Malaluan	Outside Hitter	1.78 m (5 ft 10 in)	June 24, 2001 (age 25)	De La Salle
6	(Philippines) (Canada)	Savi Davison	Outside Hitter	1.78 m (5 ft 10 in)	January 4, 1999 (age 27)	Oklahoma
7	(Philippines)	Seth Rodriguez	Middle Blocker	1.79 m (5 ft 10 in)	September 22, 1998 (age 28)	UE
8	(Philippines)	Kath Arado (C)	Libero	1.65 m (5 ft 5 in)	May 22, 1998 (age 28)	UE
9	(Philippines)	Kim Fajardo	Setter	1.73 m (5 ft 8 in)	September 30, 1993 (age 33)	De La Salle
10	(Philippines)	Majoy Baron	Middle Blocker	1.83 m (6 ft 0 in)	December 10, 1994 (age 31)	De La Salle
11	(Philippines)	Kim Kianna Dy	Opposite Hitter	1.80 m (5 ft 11 in)	July 26, 1995 (age 31)	De La Salle
12	(Philippines)	Fianne Ariola	Setter	1.65 m (5 ft 5 in)	November 23, 2002 (age 23)	UPHSD
13	(Philippines)	Dell Palomata	Middle Blocker	1.91 m (6 ft 3 in)	November 1, 1995 (age 30)	USLS
14	(Philippines)	Kiesha Bedonia	Outside Hitter	1.67 m (5 ft 6 in)	December 29, 2002 (age 23)	Far Eastern
15	(Philippines)	Jessa Ordiales	Opposite Hitter	1.78 m (5 ft 10 in)	December 14, 2000 (age 25)	De La Salle
16	(Philippines)	Angelica Alcantara	Setter	1.63 m (5 ft 4 in)	November 25, 2000 (age 25)	Adamson
17	(Philippines)	Joan Monares	Outside Hitter	1.78 m (5 ft 10 in)	January 28, 2002 (age 24)	Philippines
18	(Philippines)	Jessey de Leon	Opposite Hitter	1.80 m (5 ft 11 in)	December 18, 1994 (age 31)	UST
19	(Philippines)	Jovie Prado	Outside Hitter	1.73 m (5 ft 8 in)	July 30, 1996 (age 30)	Arellano
22	(Philippines)	Leila Cruz	Opposite Hitter	1.85 m (6 ft 1 in)	February 17, 2000 (age 26)	De La Salle
Updated as of: August 13, 2026 | Source: PVL.ph

Coaching staff

- Head coach:
  Rald Ricafort
- Assistant coaches:
  Arnold Laniog
  Manolo Refugia Jr.
  Fritz Michael Santos
  Ervin James Peralta
- Strength & conditioning coach:
  Juan Paolo Escaño

Team staff

- Team manager:
  Christian Joy del Rosario
- Team coordinator:
  Francis Ramos

Medical staff

- Physical therapists:
  Kenneth Mary Jane Yam
  Nica Claire Ozoa

== Season-by-season records ==
=== Domestic league ===
==== Philippine Super Liga (2018–2020) ====
Season	Conference	Preliminary round	Final round	Ranking	Source
2018	Grand Prix	8th (0–10, 3 pts)	Lost in quarterfinals vs. F2 Logistics, 0–3	8th place	
2018	Invitational	2nd (3–1, 9 pts) (Group B)	Won in quarterfinals vs. Generika–Ayala, 3–0; Lost in semifinals vs. Petron, 0–3 Lost in third place match vs. Cignal, 1–3	4th place	
2018	All-Filipino	6th (2–5, 5 pts)	Lost in quarterfinals vs. Generika–Ayala, 0–3	6th place	
2019	Grand Prix	3rd (8–6, 22 pts)	Won in quarterfinals vs. Generika–Ayala in two games (Note: Team had twice-to-beat advantage.); Lost in semifinals vs. F2 Logistics, 0–2 (Note: Best-of-three series.) Won in third place match vs. Cignal, 3–2	3rd place	
2019	All-Filipino	6th (6–8, 17 pts)	Lost in quarterfinals vs. Foton, 1–3	6th place	
2019	Invitational	3rd (1–2, 3 pts) (Pool C)	Did not qualify	5th place	
2020	Grand Prix	Conference cancelled			

==== Premier Volleyball League (2021–present) ====
Season	Conference	Preliminary round	Final round	Ranking	Source
2021 (team)	Open	7th (3–6, 9 pts)	Did not qualify	7th place	
2022 (team)	Open	3rd (1–2, 3 pts) (Pool B)	Lost in quarterfinals vs. Choco Mucho, 2–3 (Note: Opposing team had twice-to-beat advantage.) Won in fifth place match vs. F2 Logistics, 3–2	5th place	
2022 (team)	Invitational	2nd (4–2, 12 pts)	Finished 3rd in semifinals (2–2, 8 pts) Lost in third place match vs. Cignal, 2–3	4th place	
2022 (team)	Reinforced	6th (3–5, 10 pts)	Did not qualify	6th place	
2023 (team)	First All-Filipino	3rd (6–2, 18 pts)	Lost in semifinals vs. Petro Gazz, 1–2	4th place	
2023 (team)	Invitational	2nd (3–1, 8 pts)	Finished 5th in final round (2–3, 6 pts)	5th place	
2023 (team)	Second All-Filipino	5th (7–4, 21 pts)	Did not qualify	5th place	
2024–25 (team)	All-Filipino	5th (8–3, 23 pts)	Did not qualify	5th place	
2024–25 (team)	Reinforced	4th (6–2, 19 pts)	Won in quarterfinals vs. Chery Tiggo, 3–2; Lost in semifinals vs. Akari, 2–3 Lost in third place match vs. Cignal, 1–3	4th place	
2024–25 (team)	Invitational	Did not participate (Note: Although PLDT qualified for the 2024 Invitational Conference, the team declined the invitation to participate in the conference.)			
2024–25 (team)	All-Filipino	4th (8–3, 23 pts)	Lost in quarterfinals vs. Choco Mucho, 0–2	5th place	
2025–26 (team)	PVL on Tour	1st (5–0, 15 pts) (Pool A)	Won in quarterfinals vs. Zus Coffee, 3–0; Won in semifinals vs. Creamline, 3–2; Won in championship vs. Chery Tiggo, 3–2	Champions	
2025–26 (team)	Invitational	1st (5–0, 14 pts)	Won in championship vs. Kobe Shinwa, 3–1	Champions	
2025–26 (team)	Reinforced	3rd (6–2, 18 pts)	Won in quarterfinals vs. Cignal, 3–1; Lost in semifinals vs. Zus Coffee, 0–3 Lost in third place match vs. Akari, 2–3	4th place	
2025–26 (team)	All-Filipino	1st (7–2, 20 pts)	Won in qualifying vs. Farm Fresh, 3–1; Finished 3rd in semifinals (1–2, 4 pts) Won in third place match vs. Farm Fresh, 2–0	3rd place	
2026–27 (team)	Invitational	4th (3–2, 8 pts)	Won in third place match vs. Creamline, 3–1	3rd place	

=== AVC Women's Volleyball Champions League ===
Year	Preliminary round	Final round	Ranking	Source
2025	2nd (1–1, 4 pts) (Pool D)	Lost in quarterfinals vs. Zhetsyu, 0–3	7th place	

== Individual awards ==
=== Premier Volleyball League ===
Season	Conference	Award	Name	Source
2022	Invitational	1st Best Middle Blocker	(Philippines) Mika Reyes	
2022	Invitational	2nd Best Middle Blocker	(Philippines) Dell Palomata	
2023	1st All-Filipino	Best Libero	(Philippines) Kath Arado	
2023	Invitational	Best Libero	(Philippines) Kath Arado	
2024–25	Reinforced	Best Middle Blocker	(Philippines) Mary Joy Baron	
2024–25	All-Filipino	Best Outside Spiker	(Philippines) (Canada) Savi Davison	
2025–26	PVL on Tour	Most Valuable Player (Finals)	(Philippines) Mika Reyes	
2025–26	PVL on Tour	Best Middle Blocker	(Philippines) Majoy Baron	
2025–26	PVL on Tour	Best Libero	(Philippines) Kath Arado	
2025–26	Invitational	Most Valuable Player (Conference)	(Philippines) (Canada) Savi Davison	
2025–26	Invitational	Most Valuable Player (Finals)	(Philippines) Kath Arado	
2025–26	Invitational	Best Libero	(Philippines) Kath Arado	
2025–26	Reinforced	Best Outside Spiker	(Philippines) (Canada) Savi Davison	
2025–26	All-Filipino	Best Libero	(Philippines) Kath Arado	
2026–27	Invitational	Best Outside Spiker	(Philippines) (Canada) Savi Davison	
2026–27	Invitational	Best Libero	(Philippines) Kath Arado	

=== Philippine Super Liga ===
Season	Conference	Award	Name	Source
2019	Grand Prix	Best Middle Blocker (foreign)	(United States) Grace Lazard	
2019	Grand Prix	Best Opposite Spiker (local)	(Philippines) Aiko Urdas	

== Team captains ==
- (Philippines) Janet Serafica (2018)
- (Philippines) Ging Balse (2018)
- (Philippines) Aiko Sweet Urdas (2018)
- (Philippines) Grethcel Soltones (2019)
- (Philippines) Jerrili Malabanan (2019)
- (Philippines) Rysabelle Devanadera (2019–2020)
- (Philippines) Rhea Dimaculangan (2021–2022)
- (Philippines) Mika Reyes (2023)
- (Philippines) Kath Arado (2024–present)

== Former players ==
- Aiko Sweet Urdas
- Aiza Maizo-Pontillas (2015)
- Alyssa Eroa (2018-2020)
- Alyssa Valdez (2014-2015)
- Anjelica Legacion
- Celine Domingo (2018)
- Charo Soriano
- Christine Agno
- Czarina Grace Carandang
- Eli Soyud (2021-2023)
- Erika Santos
- Fiola Ceballos
- Genie Sabas
- Grethcel Soltones (2018-2019)
- Heather Guino-o
- Honey Royse Tubino (2023)
- Isa Molde (2021)
- Jaja Santiago (2014-2015)
- Janet Serafica
- Janine Marciano
- Jasmine Nabor
- Jerrili Malabanan
- Jorelle Singh
- Joyce Sta.Rita
- Jules Samonte
- Kath Villegas
- La Rainne Fabay
- Lhara Clavano
- Lizlee Anne Gata-Pantone
- Lutgarda Malaluan
- Gel Cayuna
- Mariella Gabarda
- Marist Layug
- Mary Anne Mendrez
- Mary Jean Balse
- Maureen Penetrante-Ouano
- Michelle Morente
- Rachel Austero
- Rhea Dimaculangan
- Royse Tubino
- Rubie De Leon
- Ryssabelle Devanadera
- Sue Roces
- Toni Rose Basas
- Venice Puzon
- Vira Guillema
- Wendy Anne Semana
- Ysabel Jimenez
- Zen Perolino

Foreign players

Cuba

- Gyselle Silva
- Wilma Salas

France

- Maeve Orle

Russia

- Elena Savkina-Samoilenko
- Anastasia Bavykina

UK

- Grace Lazard

USA

- Kendra Dahlke

== Draft history ==
Season	Pick No.	Name
2024	8	Angelica Alcantara
2025	9	Alleiah Malaluan
2025	21	Zenneth Perolino
2026	7	Fianne Ariola

== Coaches ==
- Ronald Dulay (2018 Grand Prix)
- Emilio Reyes Jr. (2018 Invitational)
- Roger Gorayeb (2018–2021)
- George Pascua (2022)
- Rald Ricafort (2023–present)

== Imports ==
- (Cuba) Gyselle Silva (2018)
- (Serbia) Marija Jelic (2018)
- (United States) Grace Lazard (2019)
- (United States) Kendra Dahlke (2019)
- (France) Maeva Orle (2020)
- (Russia) Elena Savkina-Samoilenko (2022)
- (Russia) Elena Savkina-Samoilenko (2024)
- (Cuba) Wilma Salas (2025 AVC CL)
- (Russia) Anastasiia Bavykina (2025)

== See also ==
- PLDT women's volleyball team (2013–2018)
- PLDT men's volleyball team
