= Chie Saet =

Filipino volleyball player

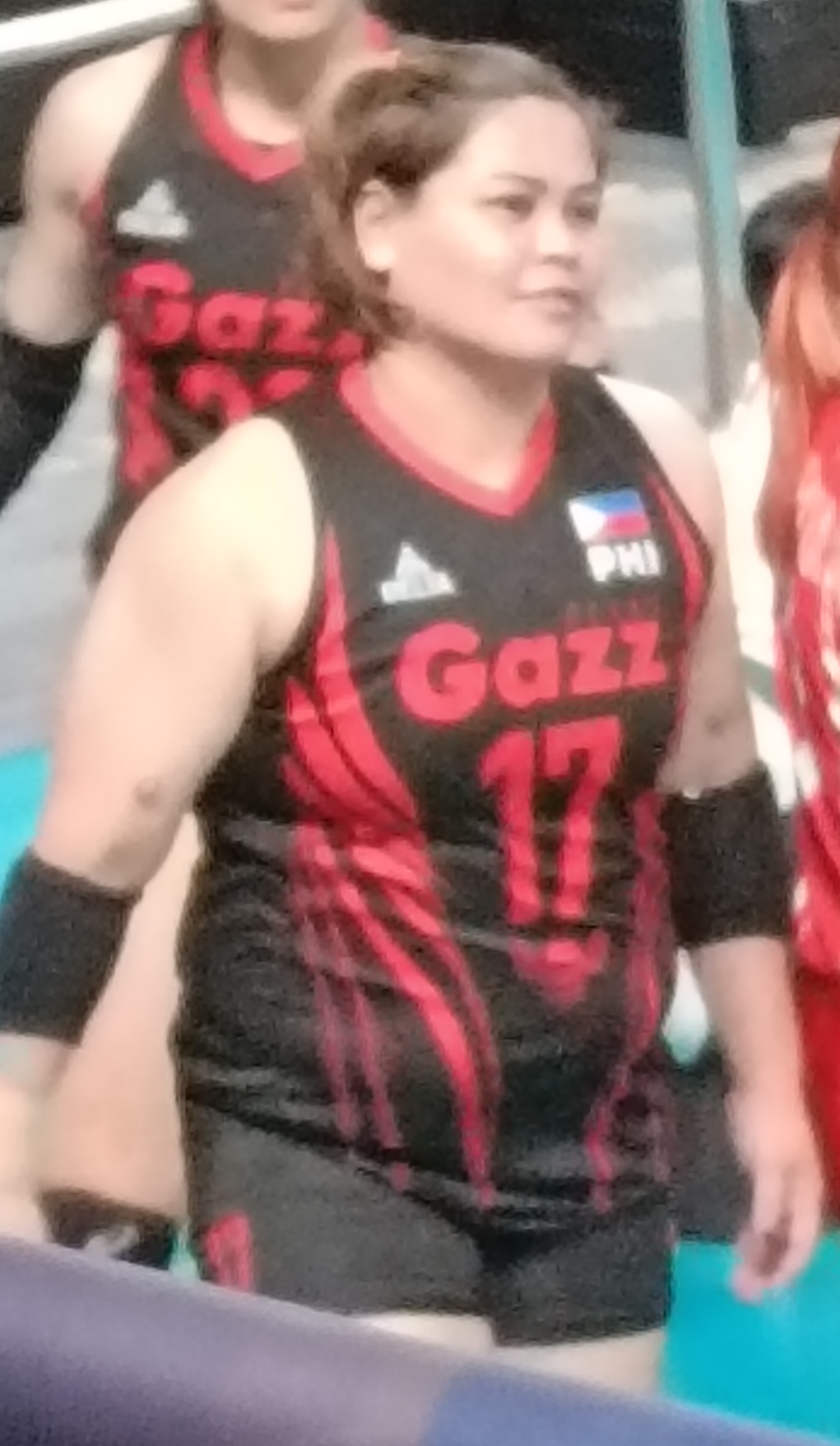
- Saet in 2025

Personal information
- Full name: Relea Ferina Saet
- Nickname: Chie
- Nationality: Filipino
- Born: November 24, 1984 (age 41)
- Height: 5 ft 5 in (1.65 m)
- Education: De La Salle University

Volleyball information
- Position: Setter
- Current club: Zus Coffee Thunderbelles

Career
Years	Teams
2013	PCSO Bingo Milyonaryo Puffins
2014–2015	Cagayan Valley Lady Rising Suns
2015	Kia Forte
2017	Cignal HD Spikers
2018–2025	Petro Gazz Angels
2026–present	Zus Coffee Thunderbelles

Relea Ferina "Chie" Saet (born November 24, 1984) is a Filipina professional volleyball player for the Zus Coffee Thunderbelles of the Premier Volleyball League (PVL).

== Early life and education ==
Relea Ferina Saet was born on November 24, 1984, in Manila, Philippines. She pursued a degree in Philippine studies at the De La Salle University.

== Career ==
=== College ===
Saet was a member of DLSU Lady Spikers collegiate women's University and plays as a Setter in the UAAP. She made her debut as a Setter of the team in 2003.

In 2004, she won best Setter award in UAAP Season 67 and Shakey's V-League and her team DLSU became the champion of the 2 tournaments.

In 2005, she won best Setter award again in UAAP Season 68 and Shakey's V-League 1st and 2nd Conference and her team DLSU became the champion of the 3 tournaments.

=== Club ===
In 2013, Saet played in Cagayan Valley Lady Rising Suns and her team became the champion that year.

In 2016, she became Guest player of TIP Lady Engineers in the Shakey's V-League 13th Season Collegiate Conference.

In 2017, she played for the Cignal HD Spikers in the Philippine Super Liga.

In 2018, she joined newly formed club Petro Gazz Angels of the Premier Volleyball League. She was captain of the team from 2019 to 2023. She helped the team win 4 PVL titles – the 2019, 2022, and 2025 PVL Reinforced Conferences and the 2024 PNVF Champions League

In January 2026, Saet signed with the Strong Group Athletics which meant she is expected to either join the Farm Fresh Foxies or the Zus Coffee Thunderbelles.

== Awards ==
=== Collegiate ===
==== Individual ====
Year	League	Season/Conference	Award	Ref
2004	SVL	1st	Best setter	
2004	SVL	2nd	Best setter	
2004	UAAP	67	Best setter	
2005	SVL	1st	Best setter	
2005	UAAP	68	Best setter	
2006	SVL	1st	Best setter	

==== Team ====
Year	UAAP Season	Title	Ref
2003	66	Champions	
2004	67	Champions	
2005	68	Champions	

=== Clubs ===
==== Individual ====
Year	League	Season/Conference	Award	Ref
2014	SVL	Reinforced	Best server	
2017	PSL	Invitational	Best setter	

==== Team ====
Year	League	Conference	Club	Title	Ref
2013	SVL	Open	Cagayan Valley Lady Rising Suns	Champions	
2014	SVL	Open	Cagayan Valley Lady Rising Suns	Runner-up	
2014	SVL	Reinforced	Cagayan Valley Lady Rising Suns	Champions	
2015	SVL	Open	Cagayan Valley Lady Rising Suns	3rd Place	
2017	PSL	Invitational	Cignal HD Spikers	Champions	
2017	PSL	All-Filipino	Cignal HD Spikers	3rd Place	
2019	PVL	Reinforced	Petro Gazz Angels	Champions	
2019	PVL	Open	Petro Gazz Angels	Runner-up	
2021	PVL	Open	Petro Gazz Angels	3rd Place	
2022	PVL	Open	Petro Gazz Angels	Runner-up	
2022	PVL	Reinforced	Petro Gazz Angels	Champions	
2023	PVL	First All-Filipino	Petro Gazz Angels	Runner-up	
2024	PNVF	Champions League	Petro Gazz Angels	Champions	
