= Anastasia Bavykina =

Russian volleyball player (born 1992)

Anastasija Bavykina
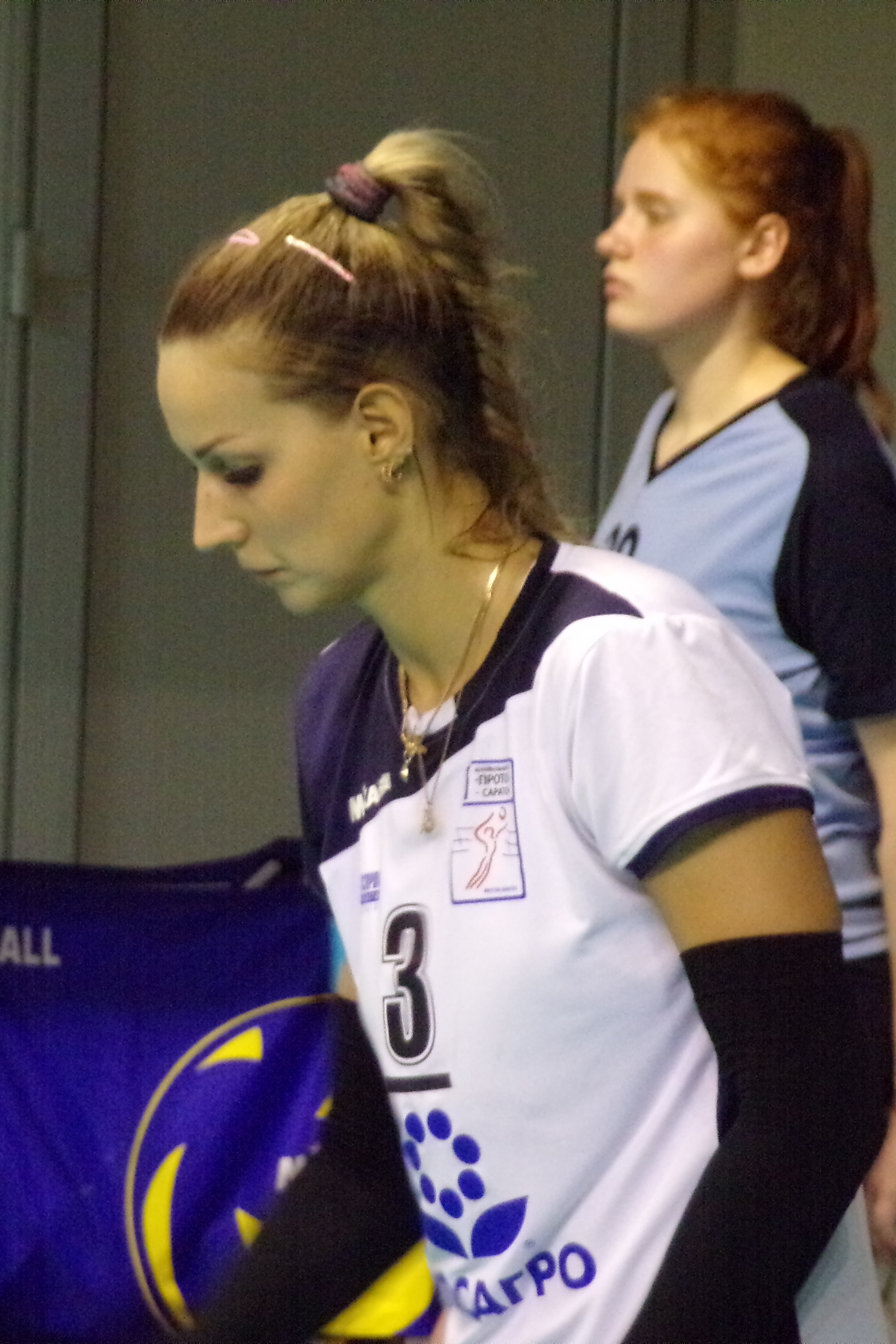

Personal information
- Nationality: Russian
- Born: 6 July 1992 (age 34)
- Height: 1.88 m (74 in)
- Weight: 73 kg (161 lb)
- Spike: 313 cm (123 in)
- Block: 300 cm (118 in)

Volleyball information
- Position: Opposite
- Current club: PLDT High Speed Hitters
- Number: 3 (national team)

Career
Years	Teams
2018	WVC Dynamo Kazan

National team
2015	Russia

Anastasija Al'bertovna Bavykina (Russian: Анастасия Альбертовна Бавыкина; born 1992) is a Russian female volleyball player, playing as an outside spiker for the PLDT High Speed Hitters of the Premier Volleyball League (PVL) in the Philippines. She is part of the Russia women's national volleyball team.

She competed at the 2015 European Games in Baku. On club level she played for Zarechie Odintsovo in 2015.
