= 2004 Shakey's V-League season =

Philippine collegiate women's volleyball season

2004 SVL season
- League: Shakey's V-League
- Sport: Volleyball
- TV partner: IBC-13

1st Conference
- Season champions: UST Growling Tigresses
- Runners-up: De La Salle Lady Archers
- Season MVP: Mary Jean Balse (UST)

2nd Conference
- Season champions: De La Salle Lady Archers
- Runners-up: UST Growling Tigresses
- Season MVP: Michelle Carolino (La Salle)

Seasons
- 2nd, 2005 →

The 2004 Shakey's V-League (SVL) season was the first season of the Shakey's V-League. Founded in 2004 and organized by Sports Vision Management Group, Inc. (Sports Vision). The league began as the Shakey's V-League, a women's collegiate league with teams coming from the University Athletic Association of the Philippines (UAAP), the National Collegiate Athletic Association (NCAA) and the Cebu Schools Athletic Foundation (CESAFI), and among others.

== First conference ==
=== Participating teams ===
Abbr.	Team
CSJL	Colegio de San Juan de Letran Lady Knights
DLSU	De La Salle University Lady Archers
FEU	Far Eastern University Lady Tamaraws
LPU	Lyceum of the Philippines University Lady Pirates
SSC-R	San Sebastian College–Recoletos Lady Stags
UST	University of Santo Tomas Tigresses

=== Final round ===
- All series are best-of-3

Semifinals
1	UST Growling Tigresses	3	3
4	San Sebastian Lady Stags	2	1
2	De La Salle Lady Archers	3	3
3	Lyceum Lady Pirates	1	0

Finals
UST Growling Tigresses	3	3
De La Salle Lady Archers	1	1
3rd place
San Sebastian Lady Stags
Lyceum Lady Pirates

Finals

July 1, 2004; 3:00 PM (UTC +8:00)	UST Growling Tigresses	3–1	De La Salle Lady Archers	Lyceum Gym, Intramuros, Manila
July 1, 2004; 3:00 PM (UTC +8:00)	(17–25, 25–21, 25–16, 25–16)			Lyceum Gym, Intramuros, Manila

July 4, 2004; 3:00 PM (UTC +8:00)	De La Salle Lady Archers	1–3	UST Growling Tigresses	Lyceum Gym, Intramuros, Manila
July 4, 2004; 3:00 PM (UTC +8:00)	(25–18, 22–25, 13–25, 20–25)			Lyceum Gym, Intramuros, Manila

2004 Shakey's V-League Champions
University of Santo Tomas Tigresses
Mary Jean Balse, Venus Bernal, Joyce Paño, Lourdes Palomo (c), Anna Eliza Fulo, Vida Rica Gutierrez, Missy Cruz (L), Kate Co Yu Kang
Head coach: August Sta. Maria

=== Final standings ===
Rank	Team
1st place, gold medalist(s)	University of Santo Tomas
2nd place, silver medalist(s)	De La Salle University
3rd place, bronze medalist(s)	Lyceum of the Philippines University
4	San Sebastian College–Recoletos
5	Colegio de San Juan de Letran
6	Far Eastern University

=== Individual awards ===
Award	Name
Most Valuable Player	Mary Jean Balse ( UST)
Best Scorer	Angela Descalsota ( San Sebastian)
Best Attacker	Angelica Bigcas ( Lyceum)
Best Blocker	Maureen Penetrante ( La Salle)
Best Server	Joyce Paño ( UST)
Best Setter	Relea Ferina Saet ( La Salle)
Best Digger	Sharmaine Miles Peñano ( La Salle)
Best Receiver	Kate Co Yu Kang ( UST)

== Second conference ==
The Shakey's V-League 1st season 2nd conference started on November 28, 2004, at the PhilSports Arena, Pasig, Philippines, with 7 teams competing in the conference.

=== Participating teams ===
Abbr.	Team	Ref.
CSJL	Colegio de San Juan de Letran Lady Knights	
DLSU	De La Salle University Lady Archers	
FEU	Far Eastern University Lady Tamaraws	
LPU	Lyceum of the Philippines University Lady Pirates	
PSC	(Philippines) Philippine Sports Commission Lady Legends	
SSC-R	San Sebastian College–Recoletos Lady Stags	
UST	University of Santo Tomas Tigresses	

=== Final round ===
Semifinals
1	De La Salle Lady Archers	3	2	3
4	Letran Lady Knights	0	3	0
2	UST Growling Tigresses	3	3
3	(Philippines) PSC Lady Legends	2	0

Finals
De La Salle Lady Archers	3	3
UST Growling Tigresses	2	0
3rd place
(Philippines) PSC Lady Legends	1	1
Letran Lady Knights	3	3

Final's match results
3rd place

Date	Time	Teams	Set	1	2	3	4	5	Total	Report
Feb 13	14:00	Letran Lady Knights	3	25	25	18	25		93	
Feb 13	14:00	(Philippines) PSC Lady Legends	1	22	21	25	20		88	

Championship

Date	Time	Teams	Set	1	2	3	4	5	Total	Report
Feb 10	16:00	De La Salle Lady Archers	3	27	17	25	25	15	109	
Feb 10	16:00	UST Growling Tigresses	2	29	25	22	23	7	106	
Feb 13	16:00	De La Salle Lady Archers	3	25	25	25			75	
Feb 13	16:00	UST Growling Tigresses	0	14	18	23			55	

=== Final standings ===
Rank	Team
1st place, gold medalist(s)	De La Salle University
2nd place, silver medalist(s)	University of Santo Tomas
3rd place, bronze medalist(s)	Colegio de San Juan de Letran
4	(Philippines) Philippine Sports Commission
5	Lyceum of the Philippines University
6	Far Eastern University
7	San Sebastian College–Recoletos

=== Individual awards ===
Award	Name
Most Valuable Player	Michelle Carolino ( La Salle)
Best Scorer	Cherry Rose Macatangay ( Letran)
Best Attacker	Roxanne Pimentel ( UST)
Best Blocker	Maureen Penetrante ( La Salle)
Best Server	Rubie De Leon ( UST)
Best Setter	Relea Ferina Saet ( La Salle)
Best Digger	Sharmaine Miles Peñano ( La Salle)
Best Receiver	Mary Jean Balse ( UST)

== Venues ==
- Lyceum Gym, Intramuros, Manila
- PhilSports Arena, Pasig
- Rizal Memorial Coliseum, Manila
