= UAAP Season 68 =

University athletic year

- "Soar Higher!"
- Host school: Adamson University

Overall
- Seniors: University of Santo Tomas
- Juniors: University of the East

Seniors' champions
Sport		Men	Women
Basketball		FEU	Ateneo
Volleyball		FEU	La Salle
Football		Ateneo	La Salle
Baseball		UP	N/A
Softball		N/A	Adamson
Fencing		UE	UE
Swimming		UP	UST
Badminton		UST	La Salle
Chess		UP	UST
Judo		UP	UST
Taekwondo		UST	UST
Table tennis		UST	UST
Tennis		La Salle	La Salle
Track and field		FEU	FEU
- Cheerdance: UST (Ex - Coed)

Juniors' champions
Sport		Boys	Girls
Basketball		DLSZ	N/A
Volleyball		UE	UE
Softball		Ateneo	UE
Fencing		UE	
Badminton		UST	
Chess		UE	
Judo		UST	
- (NT) = No tournament; (DS) = Demonstration Sport; (Ex) = Exhibition;

UAAP Season 68 was the 2005–06 season of the University Athletic Association of the Philippines. Several events were held, the most prominent was the basketball tournament. The tournament is divided into three divisions: the Juniors tournament for high school students, the Women's tournament for female college students, and the Men's tournament for male college students

The FEU Tamaraws swept the defending champions La Salle Green Archers, 2 games to none in the Men's tournament to take their record-breaking 19th title, with Arwind Santos as the Finals MVP. It was a rematch of the 2004 Final, where the Archers prevailed, 2–1.

In the juniors division, the De La Salle Zobel Junior Archers swept the UPIS Junior Maroons, 2–0, to take their first UAAP title. It was also La Salle's first Juniors title since the 1955 La Salle Green Hills championship in the NCAA.

In the women's tournament, the Ateneo Lady Eagles swept the Adamson Lady Falcons, 2 games to none, to win their first UAAP women's title. The Lady Eagles snapped the Lady Falcons' two year title run.

== Basketball ==
=== Men's tournament ===
==== Elimination round ====
Pos	Team	W	L	PCT	GB	Qualification
1	FEU Tamaraws	12	2	.857	—	Twice-to-beat in the semifinals
2	De La Salle Green Archers (Note: This "final" team standings is overturned when La Salle forfeited their games after the season was over. See Suspension of De La Salle University for details.)	10	4	.714 (Note: Head-to-head record: La Salle 3–1, Ateneo 2–2, UE 1–3; third-seed playoff: Ateneo 76–65 UE)	2	Twice-to-beat in the semifinals
3	Ateneo Blue Eagles	10	4	.714	2	Twice-to-win in the semifinals
4	UE Red Warriors	10	4	.714	2	Twice-to-win in the semifinals
5	UP Fighting Maroons	6	8	.429	6	
6	UST Growling Tigers	4	10	.286	8	
7	Adamson Falcons (H)	3	11	.214	9	
8	NU Bulldogs	1	13	.071	11	

Source: UBelt.com
(H) Hosts
Notes:

Note: The "final" team standings were adjusted when La Salle forfeited its games after the season was over. See Suspension of De La Salle University-Manila for details.

==== Playoffs ====
Semifinals (Top 2 twice-to-beat)
1	FEU	78
4	UE	57
2	La Salle	74
3	Ateneo	57

Finals (Best-of-three playoff)
1	FEU	75	73
2	La Salle	73	71

==== Awards ====
UAAP Season 68 men's basketball champions
FEU Tamaraws
19th title, third consecutive title

- Finals Most Valuable Player: Arwind Santos (FEU Tamaraws)
- Season Most Valuable Player: Arwind Santos (FEU Tamaraws)
- Rookie of the Year: Jai Reyes (Ateneo Blue Eagles)

=== Women's tournament ===
==== Awards ====
- Finals Most Valuable Player: Cassey Tioseco (Ateneo Lady Eagles)
- Season Most Valuable Player: Kristine Prado (De La Salle Lady Archers)
- Rookie of the Year: Sihaya Sadorra (UP Lady Maroons)

=== Juniors' tournament ===
The Juniors' tournament saw the return of Far Eastern University juniors team, the FEU-FERN Baby Tamaraws.

==== Elimination round ====
Pos	Team	W	L	PCT	GB	Qualification
1	Ateneo Blue Eaglets	12	2	.857	—	Twice-to-beat in the semifinals
2	Zobel Junior Archers	11	3	.786	1	Twice-to-beat in the semifinals
3	FEU–D Baby Tamaraws	10	4	.714 (Note: Head-to-head record: FEU 2–0 UPIS)	2	Twice-to-win in the semifinals
4	UPIS Junior Fighting Maroons	10	4	.714	2	Twice-to-win in the semifinals
5	Adamson Baby Falcons (H)	7	7	.500	5	
6	UST Tiger Cubs	5	9	.357	7	
7	UE Junior Red Warriors	2	12	.143	10	
8	NUNS Bullpups	0	14	.000	12	

Rules for classification: 1) winning percentage; 2) if tied for #2 or #4, one-game playoff; 3) head-to-head record; 4) head-to-head point differential; 5) overall point differential
(H) Hosts

==== Playoffs ====
Semifinals
1	Ateneo	61	58
4	UPIS	62	76
2	DLSZ	74
3	FEU–FERN	66

Best of 3 Finals
4	UPIS	49	62
2	DLSZ	73	86

==== Semifinals ====
In the semifinals, the higher seed has the twice-to-beat advantage, where they only have to win once, while their opponents twice, to progress.

===== (1) Ateneo vs. (4) UPIS =====
The Ateneo Blue Eaglets had the twice-to-beat advantage.

Studio 23

September 25

Ateneo Blue Eaglets	61–62	UPIS Junior Fighting Maroons

Araneta Coliseum, Quezon City

Studio 23

September 29

Ateneo Blue Eaglets	58–76	UPIS Junior Fighting Maroons
UPIS wins series in two games

Araneta Coliseum, Quezon City

===== (2) DLSZ vs. (3) FEU-FERN =====
The De La Salle Junior Archers had twice-to-beat advantage.

Studio 23

September 25

Zobel Junior Archers	74–66	FEU–D Baby Tamaraws
La Salle wins series in one game

Araneta Coliseum, Quezon City

==== Finals ====
Studio 23

October 2

Zobel Junior Archers	73–49	UPIS Junior Fighting Maroons

Blue Eagle Gym, Quezon City

Studio 23

October 6

Zobel Junior Archers	86–62	UPIS Junior Fighting Maroons
La Salle wins series 2–0

Araneta Coliseum, Quezon City

==== Awards ====
- Finals Most Valuable Player: Simon Atkins (Zobel Junior Archers)
- Season Most Valuable Player: Francis Maniego (UPIS Junior Fighting Maroons)
- Rookie of the Year: Raffy Mangahas (FEU–D Baby Tamaraws)

== Cheerdance ==
The Cheerdance Competition was held on September 17, 2005 at the Araneta Coliseum.

Order	Pep squad	Score
1st	UST Salinggawi Dance Troupe	90.98
2nd	UP Pep Squad	90.76
3rd	FEU Cheering Squad	88.72
4th	DLSU Animo Squad	76.37
5th	UE Pep Squad	76.15
6th	Adamson Pep Squad	76.09
7th	Ateneo Blue Babble Battalion	69.33
8th	NU Pep Squad	64.48

== General championship summary ==
The general champion is determined by a point system. The system gives 15 points to the champion team of a UAAP event, 12 to the runner-up, and 10 to the third placer. The following points: 8, 6, 4, 2 and 1 are given to the rest of the participating teams according to their order of finish.

=== Medals table ===
==== Seniors' division ====
Rank	Team	Gold	Silver	Bronze	Total
1	University of Santo Tomas	8	6	5	19
2	De La Salle University	5	3	4	12
3	Far Eastern University	4	4	2	10
4	University of the Philippines Diliman	3	7	6	16
5	Ateneo de Manila University	3	2	6	11
6	University of the East*	2	2	3	7
7	Adamson University	1	2	0	3
8	National University	0	0	0	0
Totals (8 entries)		26	26	26	78

* Host nation (Season host); General champions
Notes: Results are final.

==== Juniors' division ====
Rank	Team	Gold	Silver	Bronze	Total
1	University of the East*	5	0	2	7
2	University of Santo Tomas	2	1	2	5
3	Ateneo de Manila University	1	5	1	7
4	De La Salle Zobel	1	1	3	5
5	UP Integrated School	0	2	0	2
6	National University	0	0	1	1
7	Adamson University	0	0	0	0
7	Far Eastern University–FERN College	0	0	0	0
Totals (8 entries)		9	9	9	27

* Host nation (Season host); General champions
Notes: Results are final.

=== General championship tally ===
==== Seniors' division ====
		Basketball		Volleyball (indoor)		Swimming		Chess		Tennis		Table tennis		Badminton		Taekwondo		Judo		Baseball	Softball	Football		Athletics		Fencing		Total		
Rank	Team	M	W	M	W	M	W	M	W	M	W	M	W	M	W	M	W	M	W	M	W	M	W	M	W	M	W	M	W	Overall
1	UST	6	4	12	10	12	15	10	15	12	12	15	15	15	10	15	15	10	15	12	8	10	12	8	8	6	8	143	147	290
2	UP	8	10	10	2	15	12	15	12	10	10	12	6	8	8	4	12	12	12	15	12	8	8	4	2	10	10	131	116	247
3	La Salle	—	6	6	15	8	10	12	10	15	15	6	8	10	15	8	10	6	8	4	6	12	15	12	4	4	4	103	126	229
4	Ateneo	12	15	1	6	10	8	2	4	8	8	4	10	4	4	6	6	15	10	10	4	15	6	10	10	8	12	105	103	208
5	FEU	15	8	15	8	—	—	6	8	—	—	8	12	12	12	10	8	—	—	—	—	6	10	15	15	12	6	99	87	186
6	UE (H)	10	2	4	4	6	6	8	6	6	—	10	2	6	2	12	4	8	6	—	10	4	—	6	12	15	15	95	69	164
7	Adamson	4	12	8	12	—	—	4	—	—	—	2	4	2	6	—	—	—	—	6	15	—	—	2	6	—	—	28	55	83
8	NU	2	—	2	1	—	—	1	2	—	—	1	—	1	—	—	—	—	—	8	—	—	—	—	—	—	—	15	3	18

(H) Season host; = Champion; = Runner-up; = Third place; — = No team.
Notes: Results are final.

==== Juniors' division ====
		Basketball	Volleyball (indoor)		Swimming		Chess	Table tennis	Taekwondo	Athletics	Total				
Rank	Team	B	B	G	B	G	C	B	B	B	B	G	C	K	Overall
1	UE (H)	2	15	15	10	15	15	15	10	6	58	30	15	0	103
2	UST	4	10	12	6	8	6	10	15	15	60	20	6	0	86
3	Ateneo	10	12	—	15	—	12	12	12	12	73	0	12	0	85
4	DLSZ	15	8	10	12	10	4	4	6	10	55	20	4	0	79
5	UPIS	12	6	8	8	12	8	8	8	8	50	20	8	0	78
6	NU	1	—	—	—	—	10	6	—	—	7	0	10	0	17
7	Adamson	6	—	—	—	—	2	2	—	—	8	0	2	0	10
8	FEU–FERN	8	—	—	—	—	—	—	—	—	8	0	0	0	8

(H) Season host; = Champion; = Runner-up; = Third place; — = No team.
Notes: Results are final.

=== Individual awards ===
Athlete of the Year:

- Seniors: Luica Dacanay (UP Lady Maroons, swimming)
- Juniors: Nelson Mariano III (UE Red Warriors, chess)

== Suspension of De La Salle University-Manila ==
Controversy surrounded the UAAP after De La Salle University-Manila (DLSU) discovered that two members of its men's basketball team were ineligible to play in the UAAP from the 2003–2004 up to the 2005–2006 season. The players failed Department of Education's Philippine Educational Placement Test Certificate of Rating (PEPTCR, a replacement for a high school diploma). The University has offered to return the 2004 championship and 2005 runner-up trophy and file a leave of absence from the league.

In its meeting on April 21, 2006 in Adamson University, members of the UAAP Board unanimously decided to suspend DLSU in all sports events of the UAAP for the entire 2006–2007 season as a consequence of the university's negligence and inaction against the two ineligible players.

The board has also forfeited all of La Salle's men's basketball games from 2003 to 2004. The board awarded the 2004 title to FEU as a result.

If the forfeited games are factored in, the final elimination round standings is:

Team	W	L
FEU Tamaraws	12	2
Ateneo Blue Eagles	12	2
UE Red Warriors	11	3
UP Fighting Maroons	7	7
UST Growling Tigers	6	8
Adamson Soaring Falcons	5	9
NU Bulldogs	3	11
La Salle Green Archers	0	14

All of La Salle's victories in the playoffs were also forfeited; if La Salle won the 2005 title, they would've surrendered back the trophy to the finals opponents, FEU.

== See also ==
- NCAA Season 81
