= Kobe Shinwa University =

Private university in Kobe, Japan

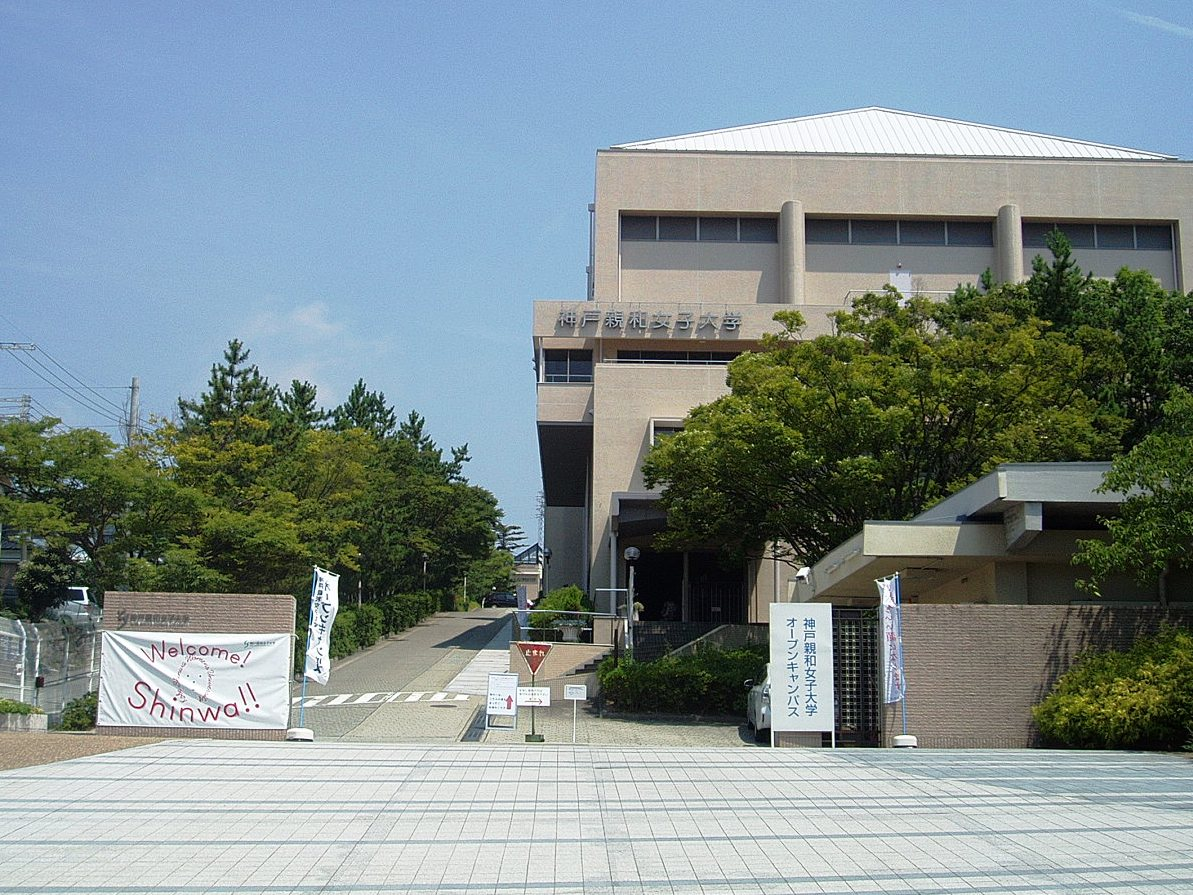
- Main entrance
- Former names: Sinwa Girls' School (1887-1908); Shinwa Girls’ High School (1908-1947); Shinwa Girls Junior School (1947-1966); Shinwa Women's University (1966-1994); Kobe Shinwa Women's University (1994-2003)
- Motto: Learn from people, apply it for people
- Type: Private Non-sectarian; All-female; Higher education institution
- Established: June 1985
- Founders: Haruko Tomokuni
- Religious affiliation: Non sectarian
- President: Tomoyo Mitsui
- Location: Kobe, Hyōgo, Japan; 34°43′41″N 135°09′17″E
- Website: www.kobe-shinwa.ac.jp

Kobe Shinwa University (神戸親和大学, Kobe shinwa daigaku) is a private university in Kita-ku, Kobe, Japan. The predecessor of the school was founded in 1886, and it was chartered as a university in 1966.

== History ==
- 1887: "Sinwa Woman's school" was established.
- 1887: Sinwa Girls’ School is founded in ZENSHOUJI of Kobe Motomachi.
- 1892: The Sinwa Girls' School closed but later reopened through the efforts of Haruko Tomokuni.
- 1896: New schoolhouse is completed in 7-chome, Shimoyamate.
- 1908: The school changed its name to "Shinwa Girls’ High School".
- 1947: Junior school education of the school starts. The school name became “Shinwa Girls’ Junior School”.
- 1966: Shinwa Women's College (Department of Literature - "Japanese literature department" and "English Literature Section") open learning.
- 1972: Department of Literature “Child Educational Research Section” was establishment.
- 1987: 100th anniversary
- 1994: Department of Literature educational major.
- 2005: Department of Literature
- 2006: Shinwa Women's College commemorates its 40th anniversary.
- 2008: Department of Literature Junior sports Educational Research.
- 2023: The university became coeducational and its name changed to "Kobe Shinwa University".

== Subjects ==
- Department of Literature(Synthetic sentence Chemistry Section)
- Child Educational Research Section
- Psychology department
- Welfare clinical subject
- Junior sports Educational Research Section

== Alumnae ==
- Model and actress Norika Fujiwara graduated from Shinwa girls' high school and Kobe Shinwa Women's University.
