= Savi Davison =

Filipino-Canadian volleyball player

Personal information
- Full name: Savannah Dawn Davison
- Nationality: Canada (Note: Sporting nationality – not to be confused with citizenship status. Davison is affiliated with Volleyball Canada as per the FIVB Player Database.)
- Born: January 4, 1999 (age 27) Toronto, Canada
- Education: New Mexico State University; University of Oklahoma
- Height: 173 cm (5 ft 8 in)
- Spike: 310 cm (122 in)
- Block: 298 cm (117 in)

Volleyball information
- Position: Outside hitter
- Current club: PLDT High Speed Hitters
- Number: 6

Career
- Years: Team
- 2023–present: PLDT High Speed Hitters
- Updated on April 2025

Savannah "Savi" Dawn Davison is a Filipino-Canadian professional volleyball player who plays for the PLDT High Speed Hitters of the Premier Volleyball League.

== Early life and education ==
Savannah Davison, was born on January 4, 1999 in Toronto, Canada

Davison attended the New Mexico State University graduating with a degree in biochemistry and a minor in human biology in 2021. She was a scholar in analytical chemistry and took the Medical College Admission Test (MCAT). Her plan to enter medical school was halted due to the COVID-19 pandemic. She then attended the University of Oklahoma and obtained her pursued master's degree in business administration in 2022.

== Career ==
=== College ===
Davison played for New Mexico State Aggies and the Oklahoma Sooners in the American NCAA.

=== PLDT ===
The PLDT High Speed Hitters announced on October 4, 2023, that Davison will be joining the team. PLDT missed the semifinals of Davison's first two PVL conferences; the 2023 Second All-Filipino Conference and 2024 All-Filipino Conference by a single game.

She missed the 2024 Reinforced Conference due to an injury.

Davison returned for the 2024–25 All-Filipino Conference emerging as the top-scorer in the newly introduced preliminary round. She was named co-Best Outside Spiker.

== National team ==
Davison has Canadian sporting nationality and is affiliated with the Volleyball Canada. Davison was invited by the Philippine National Volleyball Federation to join the Philippine national team. If she formally accepts the PNVF will help her facilitate the nationality transfer.

== Personal life ==
Davison has moved to the Philippines in October 2023 due to her contract with PLDT, fostering her connections with her Philippine-based relatives.
