= Angelica Alcantara =

Filipino volleyball player

Personal information
- Full name: Angelica Alcantara
- Nationality: Filipino
- Born: November 25, 2000 (age 25)
- Hometown: Orani, Bataan
- Height: 1.65 m (5 ft 5 in)
- Education: Adamson University (2020–2024)

Volleyball information
- Position: Setter
- Current club: PLDT High Speed Hitters
- Number: 4

Angelica Alcantara (born November 25, 2000) is a Filipino professional volleyball player. She currently plays for the PLDT High Speed Hitters in the Premier Volleyball League (PVL).

== Early life ==
Alcantara played in the Rebisco Volleyball League as part of the 14-member Adamson Lady Baby Falcons in 2018. After graduating from high school, she stayed in Adamson for her college studies.

== Career ==
=== College ===
Alcantara, who graduated with a BSESS major in Fitness & Sports Management degree magna cum laude from Adamson University on February 22, 2024, won Best Setter honors after playing for the second time at Shakey's Super League in its 2023 National Invitationals with her team winning in Game 1 of the best-of-three finals over the DLSU Lady Spikers before losing in Games 2 and 3.

Also in 2023, she was part of the Lady Falcons who won 2nd runner-up in Season 85 of the UAAP women's volleyball.

With the departure of team captain Louie Romero, Alcantara embraced a bigger role from reserve to Best Setter.

== Clubs ==
- (Philippines) PLDT High Speed Hitters (2024—present)

== Awards ==
=== Individual ===
- 2023 Shakey's Super League National Invitationals – "Best Setter"

=== Collegiate team ===
- UAAP Season 85 volleyball tournaments – 2nd runners-up, with Adamson Soaring Lady Falcons
- 2023 Shakey's Super League National Invitationals − Silver medal, with Adamson Soaring Lady Falcons
