= Araneta Coliseum =

Multi-purpose indoor arena in Quezon City, Philippines

- The Big Dome

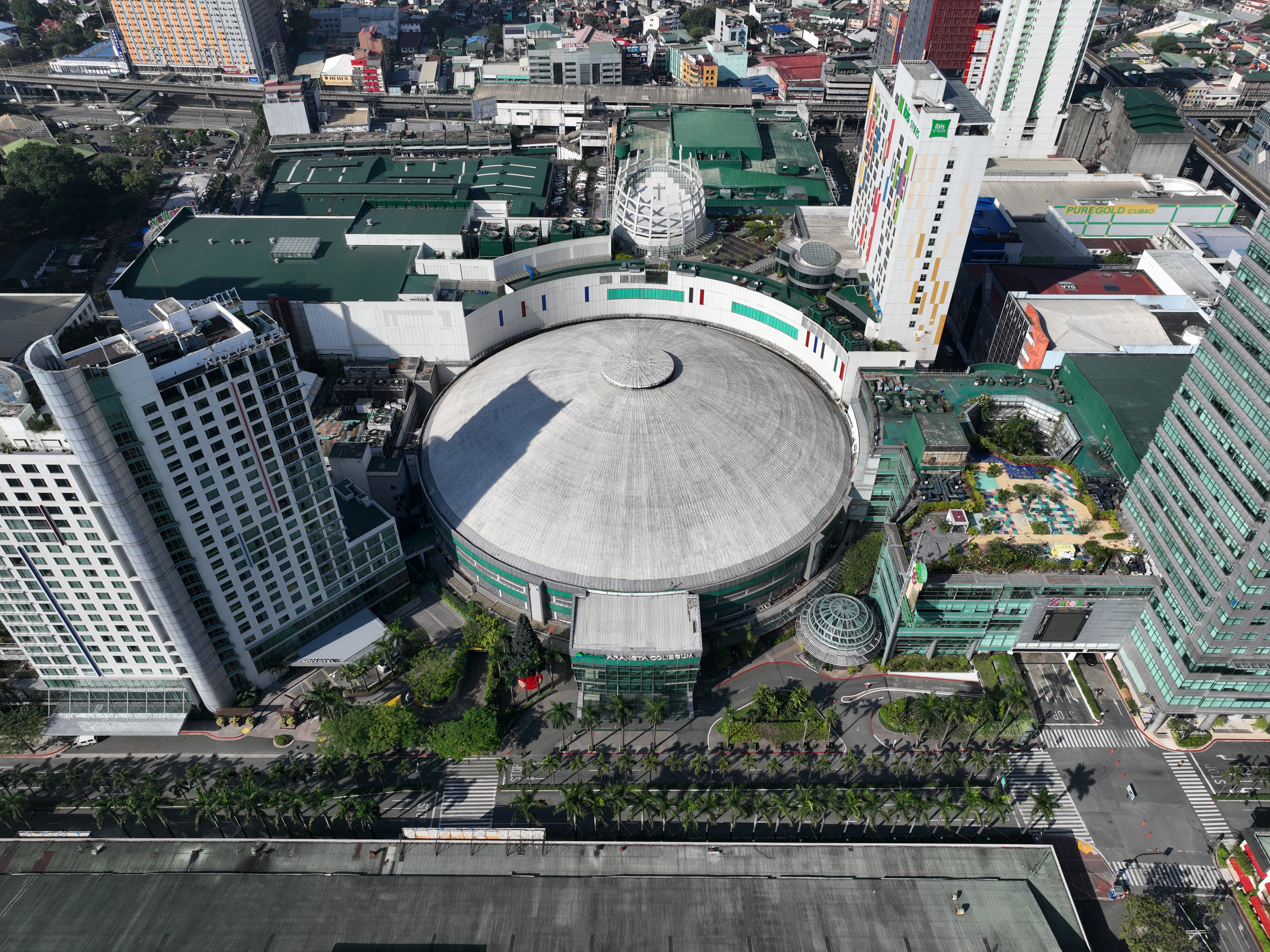
- Araneta Coliseum in 2026
- Interactive map of Araneta Coliseum
- Full name: Smart Araneta Coliseum
- Former names: Araneta Coliseum Cinema, Philippine Coliseum, and Shell Coliseum
- Location: Araneta City, Cubao, Quezon City, Metro Manila
- Coordinates: 14°37′14″N 121°3′12″E
- Owner: Progressive Development Corporation
- Operator: United Promotions, Inc. (Uniprom)
- Capacity: Basketball: 14,429; Concert: 9,679; Boxing: 15,895; Full house: 16,035 to 20,000
- Scoreboard: ADSystems 4-side LED display (Big Cube), OES ISC9000 Controller, and Homeworks Trading timer
- Record attendance: 25,000–36,000
- Public transit: Araneta Center-Cubao; Araneta Center-Cubao; 51 53 61 Farmers Plaza; 3 LRT 2-Gateway Mall; UBE Araneta City Bus Port; 1 Cubao
- Parking: 1,500 parking spaces (Araneta City Parking Garage South)

Construction
- Groundbreaking: 1957
- Built: 1958
- Opened: March 16, 1960; 66 years ago
- Renovated: 1999; 2014; 2023
- Cost: ₱6 million (1958)
- Architect: Dominador Lacson Lugtú

Tenants
- Philippines men's national basketball team NCAA (1960–present); UAAP (1960–present); PBA (1975–1984, 1995–present)

Website
- https://smartaranetacoliseum.com/

The Araneta Coliseum, also currently known by naming rights sponsorship as Smart Araneta Coliseum, is an indoor multi-purpose sports arena that is part of the Araneta City in the Cubao area of Quezon City, Philippines. Nicknamed "the Big Dome", it is one of the largest indoor arenas in Asia, and one of the largest clear span domes in the world. The dome, measuring approximately 108.0 meters (354.3 ft), was the largest in Asia from its opening in 1960 until 2001 when it was surpassed by the Ōita Stadium in Japan with a dome measuring 274.0 meters (899.0 ft).

The Smart Araneta Coliseum is mostly used for indoor sports such as basketball. It is a main venue of the Philippine Basketball Association (PBA). The Big Dome is also used for other sports and events such as boxing, cockfighting, local and international concerts, circuses, religious gatherings, and beauty pageants.

== History ==
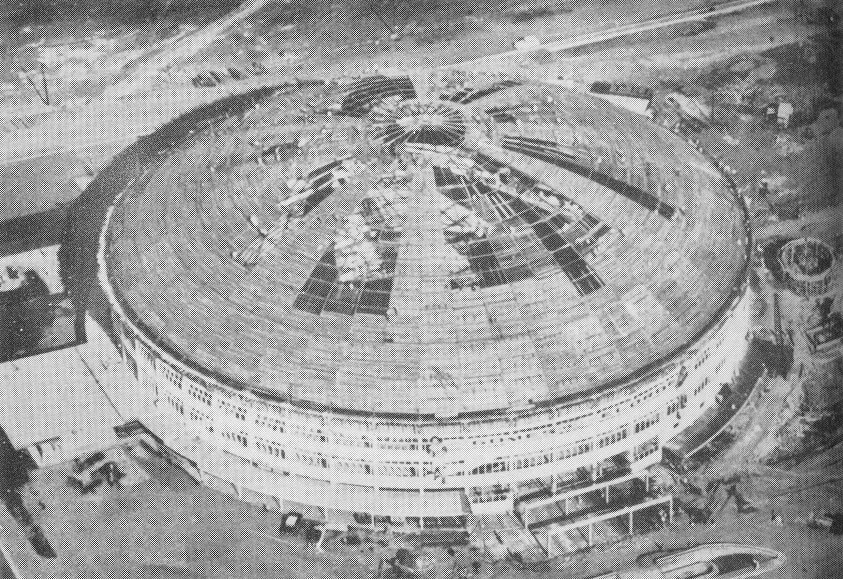
Araneta Coliseum during its construction

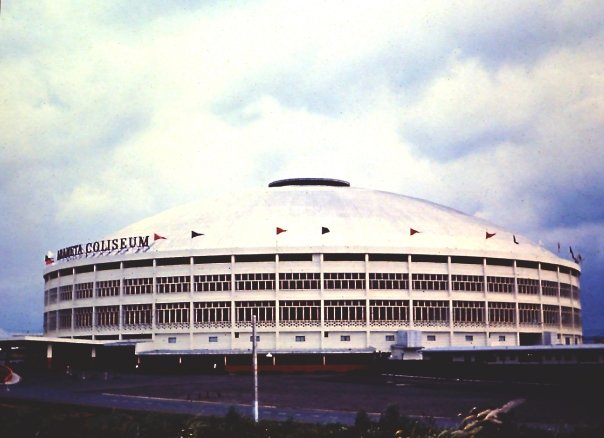
Araneta Coliseum during the 1960s

In 1952, J. Amado Araneta, a member of the Araneta family, purchased from Radio Corporation of America (RCA) 35 hectares (86 acres) of land in Cubao which includes the Araneta family home and is bounded by Epifanio Delos Santos Avenue or EDSA, Aurora Boulevard, P. Tuazon and 15th Avenue. During this time, Araneta envisioned a multi-events venue inspired by the Madison Square Garden in New York City and the Roman Colosseum in Rome, Italy, which drew criticisms from his business advisers and even Amado's personal friends. This vision led to the development of business and lifestyle buildings surrounding the coliseum, which ultimately gave rise to the Araneta Center, now renamed as the Araneta City.

The Araneta Coliseum was constructed from 1957 to late 1959 and designed and built by architect Dominador Lacson Lugtu and engineer Leonardo Onjunco Lugtu. From 1960 to 1963, the Coliseum was recognized as the largest covered coliseum in the world. Today, it remains one of the largest clear span domes in the world with a dome diameter of 108 meters.

The coliseum opened on March 16, 1960, with Gabriel "Flash" Elorde boxing for the World Junior Lightweight crown against Harold Gomes. General admission then was ₱0.80 (equivalent to ₱94.85 in 2021), and the reserve section was ₱5 (equivalent to ₱592.81 in 2021). The total demand for people who wished to enter the coliseum to watch the boxing match live breached its capacity, wherein the total capacity of the coliseum was only 36,000 people, while the total number of people who came to the coliseum totaled to around 50,000 people. The coliseum also featured a swimming pool and a gazebo during its opening, located to the current site of the Araneta City Parking Garage South and the Novotel Manila Araneta City. However, the featured facilities closed down a few years later.

On the evening of November 16, 1963, a few days after the nationwide elections, defeated Quezon provincial governor Claro Robles attempted to shoot his campaign manager Eladio Caliwara, congressman of Quezon's 2nd district, at the arena, reportedly due to Caliwara calling him a "turncoat". The two had been at the venue to watch the bout between Elorde and Love Allotey.

Among the notable events to take place at the arena were the 11th and 34th FAMAS Awards, the 1975 "Thrilla in Manila" boxing match between Muhammad Ali and Joe Frazier, in which the arena was renamed into the "Philippine Coliseum", and the annual Binibining Pilipinas beauty pageant. During the Thrilla in Manila, all of the 36,000 seats to watch the event live were sold out. Aside from boxing matches, the Philippine Basketball Association (PBA) has played most of their games at the Araneta Coliseum since its creation in 1975. Other basketball events hosted by the arena were the 1978 FIBA World Championship, a game between the 1978 NBA champions Washington Bullets and a PBA selection in 1979, and the 1982 Asian Youth Basketball Championship where the Philippines defeated China in the final.

In the third quarter of 1998, the Aranetas and Pilipinas Shell (local arm of Royal Dutch Shell) started negotiations for a naming rights deal that would have lasted until 2008. The Aranetas, who wanted to retain their name at the arena rejected the proposed name "Shell Coliseum at the Araneta Center". Instead, the parties agreed on a contract where Shell's name and logo will be painted at the arena's basketball court, a move that was almost shelved due to objections from other PBA teams because Shell owned the then-PBA team, the Shell Turbo Chargers.

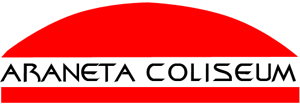
Araneta Coliseum logo from 1999 to 2011 prior to naming rights deal with Smart Communications.

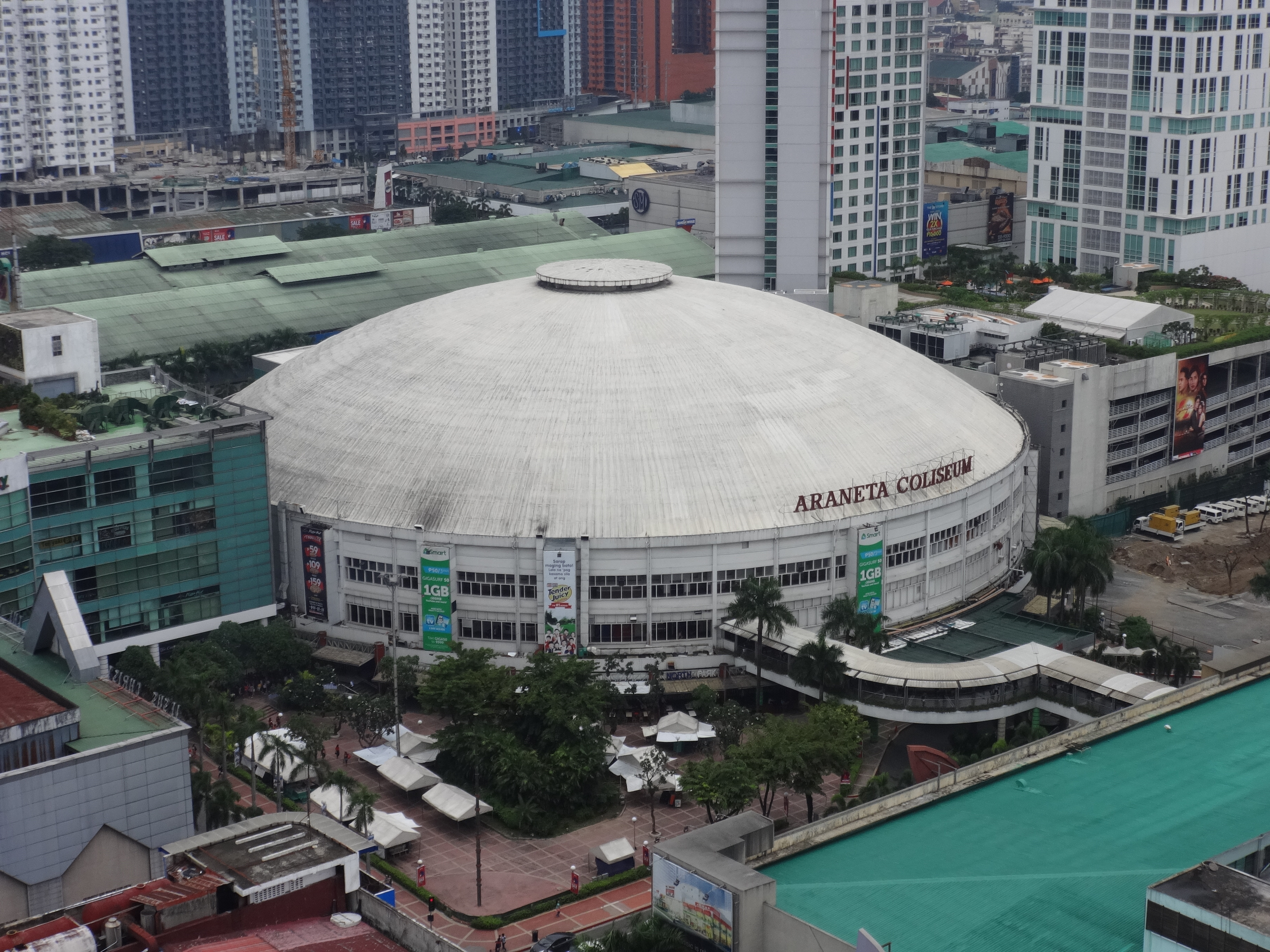
The Araneta Center in 2017, prior to the construction of Gateway Mall 2.

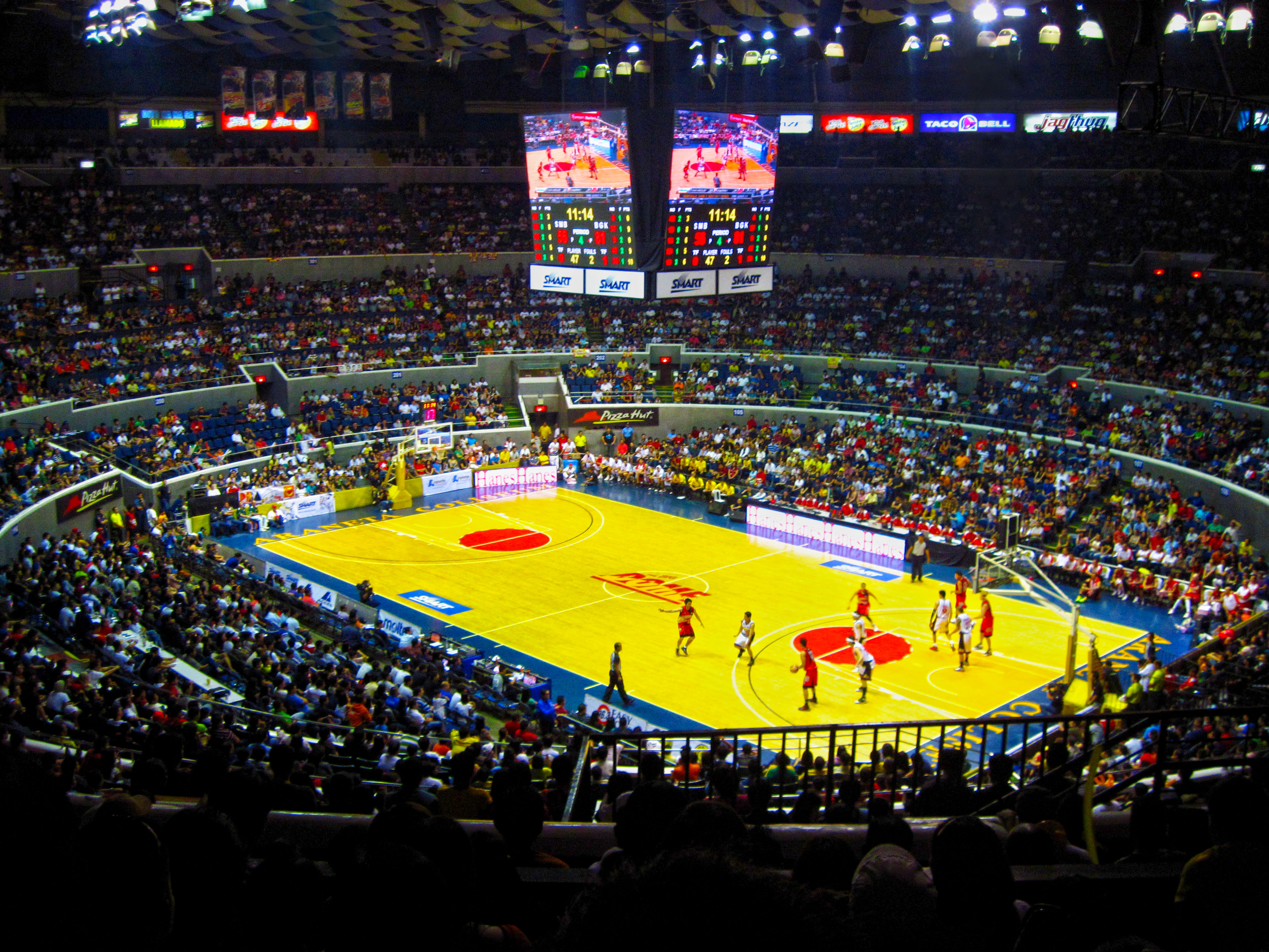
The Araneta Coliseum with the "Big Cube" LED display during a PBA game between San Miguel Beermen and Barangay Ginebra Kings in 2011. This photo was taken before the naming rights with Smart Communications took effect.

In 1999, the Araneta Group initially planned to demolish the coliseum due to high amusement taxes and rising costs, which gave the company little revenue despite being subsidized by the company since its opening in 1960. The planned demolition was one of the proposals to the company in order to save funds for other business ventures. The plan was eventually scrapped in favor of the coliseum's renovation project, due to the coliseum's historical significance and for being a landmark in both the metropolis and the country. The company later hired Denzel Skinner to spearhead the renovation works, and drew inspiration from the renovation works made in some US indoor arenas. The coliseum underwent its first major renovation at the cost of ₱200 million. The major changes include the renovation of the lower box area, replacement of seats for the patron and lower box sections, and installation of a four-sided center-hung scoreboard. The section names were also given numerical designations: 100 for Patron section, 200 for Lower Box, 300 for Upper Box A, and 400 for Upper Box B. In 2006, an LED display was added to the scoreboard.

From 2001 to 2008, the highest-grossing event at the arena is the Pacquiao vs. Larios boxing fight between Manny Pacquiao and Óscar Larios, earning ₱96.2 million. A concert by Westlife was attended by 17,887 people and earned ₱18.5 million, while a Cliff Richard concert earned ₱17.2 million despite being watched by 5,647 spectators.

Prior to the Ultimate All-Star Weekend in July 2011, it was announced that the Aranetas entered into a naming rights deal with mobile network operator Smart Communications, Inc. (a subsidiary of Philippine Long Distance Telephone Company), renaming the arena into "Smart Araneta Coliseum". The 5-year naming rights deal includes improvements and renovations to the arena such as the installation of curved escalators to improve access in the upper box and general admission areas, which was subsequently cancelled due to undisclosed reasons, and the construction of a parking lot that can accommodate up to 2,000 cars. The overall renovation project of the coliseum costed ₱1 billion.

Additional improvements for the renovation of the coliseum were made in 2012, including the renovation of the Red Gate entrance and the Green Gate side facade, landscaped surroundings, and the replacement of Upper Box level seats, thus increasing its seating capacity. The Lower Box and Patron sections were combined to make a new Patron section (100 and 200 level seats). A pathway between the former Patron and Lower Box sections was also made. The former Upper Box A section (300 level seats) was renamed as Box section and the former Upper Box B section (400 level seats) is now referred to as the "Upper Box" section. The renovation project of the coliseum was completed in June 2014.

On January 7, 2015, the Hydra-Rib basketball backboards first used in 1995 were replaced with Spalding ones. The backboards were first used in Game 1 of the 2014–15 PBA Philippine Cup Finals. On June 9, 2017, the OES SHOTS-14G7 shot clocks were replaced. The newer clocks were first used in Game 3 of the 2017 PBA Commissioner's Cup Quarterfinals match between the TNT Katropa and Meralco Bolts.

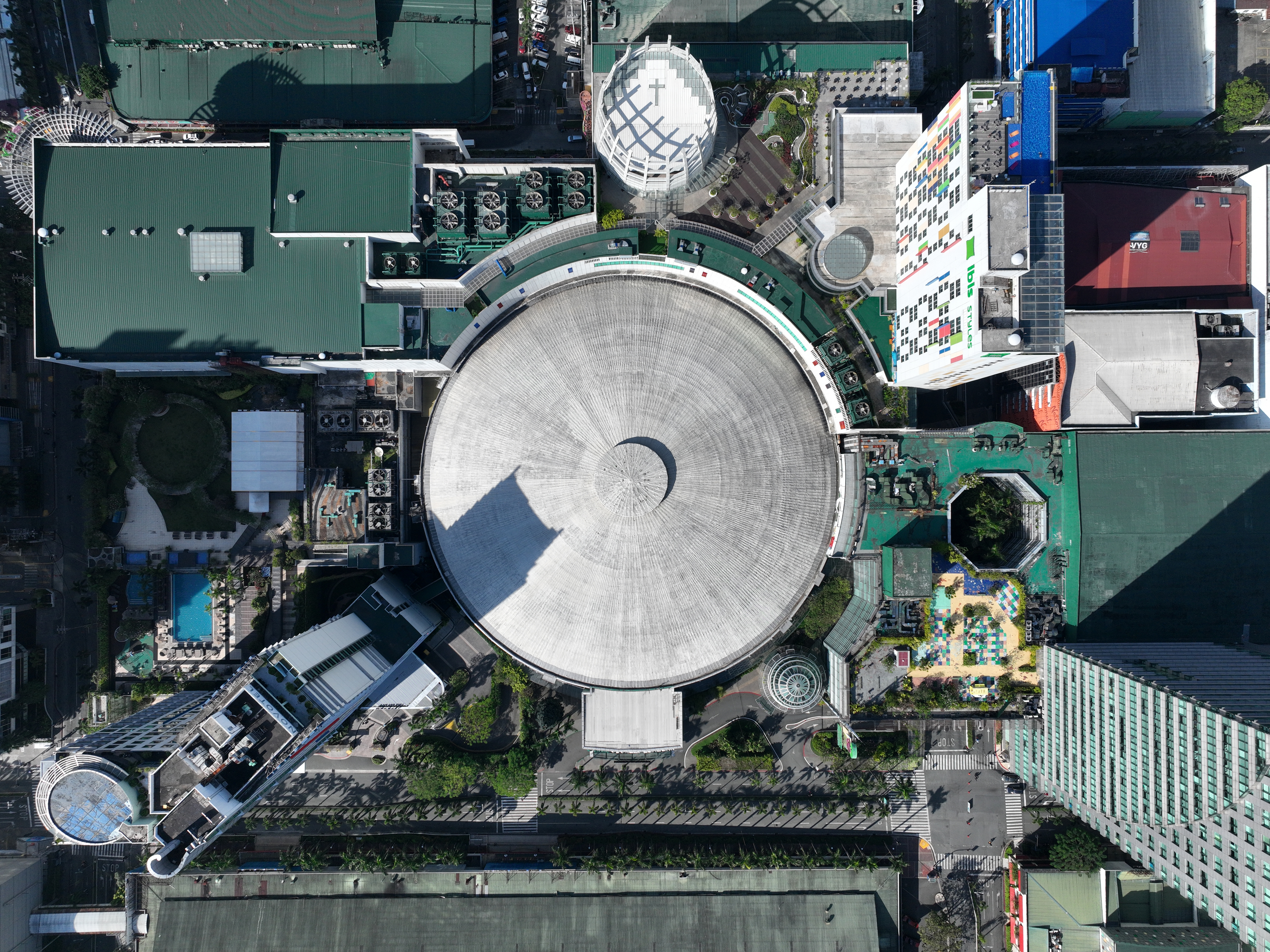
A drone shot of the large span dome of the Araneta Coliseum (2026)

Ahead of the 2023 FIBA Basketball World Cup, the Araneta Coliseum underwent another renovation, and included the replacement of the previous "Big Cube" LED video board with a slightly larger and modernized LED video board, as well as the refurbishment of seating areas and renovation of team dugouts. New entrances were opened on the upper box, lower box and general admission levels, with direct connections to the ground level and the upper ground A level of the Gateway Mall 2, which is also connected to the mall's "Coliseum Plaza" area, a food alley area located along the Red Gate entrance.

== Architecture and design ==
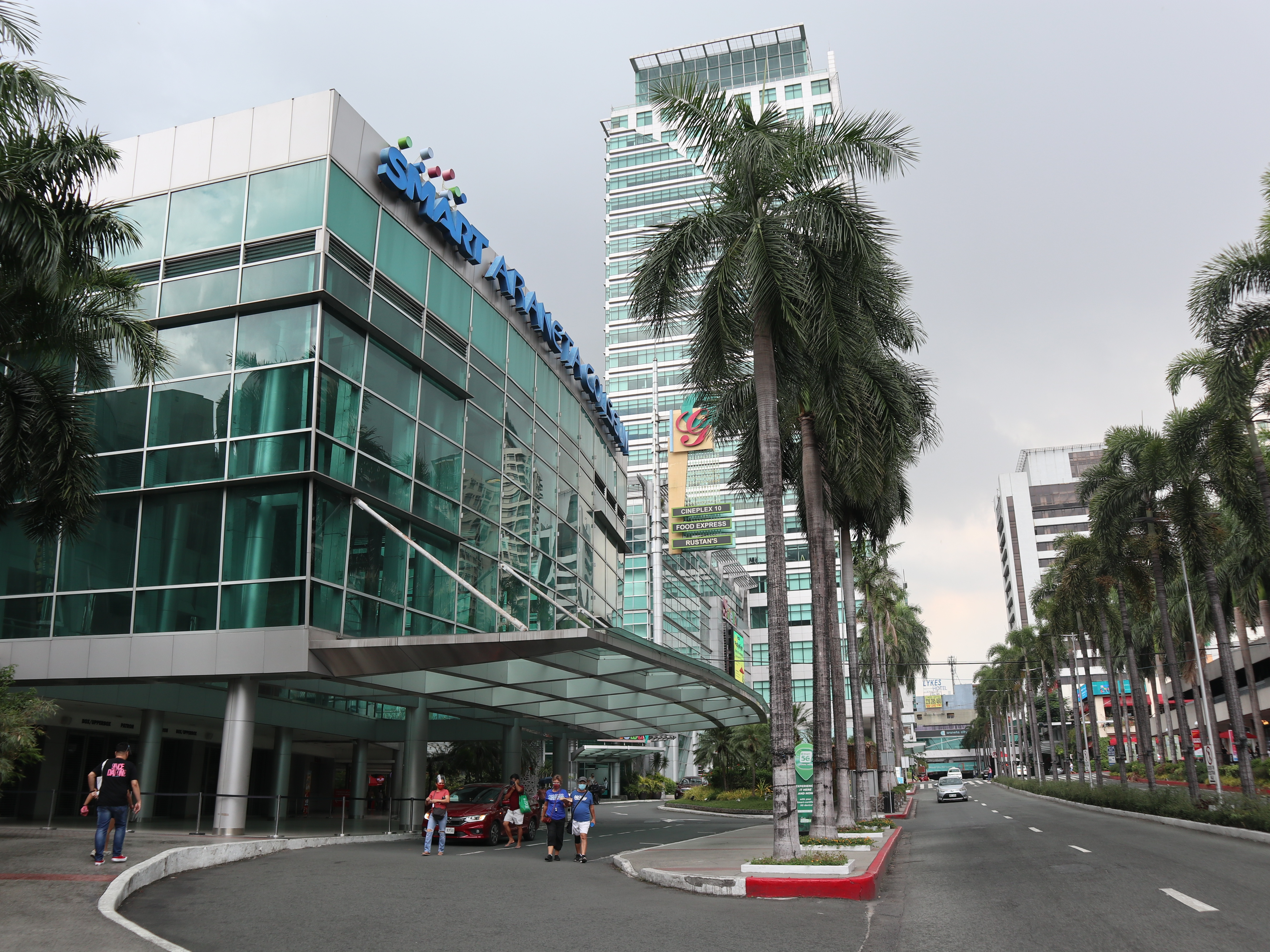
Main entrance of the Araneta Coliseum.

The Araneta Coliseum is an indoor arena designed by Dominador Lacson Lugtu. The sports venue has a large span dome with a diameter of 108 meters (354 ft) as its roof. The dome is 37 meters (121 ft) high at its highest point. The structure is supported by 48 concrete columns and 48 metal ribs. It has a floor area of 2,300 square meters (25,000 sq ft).

Richard de Leon of Atlantic, Gulf and Pacific did the steel framework of the venue – 4,965 aluminum sheets of gauge measuring 7.3 by 1.2 by 2.4 metres (24 ft × 4 ft × 8 ft) was devised. Steam-treated wood from a variety of Philippine hardwood such as apitong, tanguile and narra fitted using tongue and groove was also used as support.

== Notable events ==
=== Basketball ===
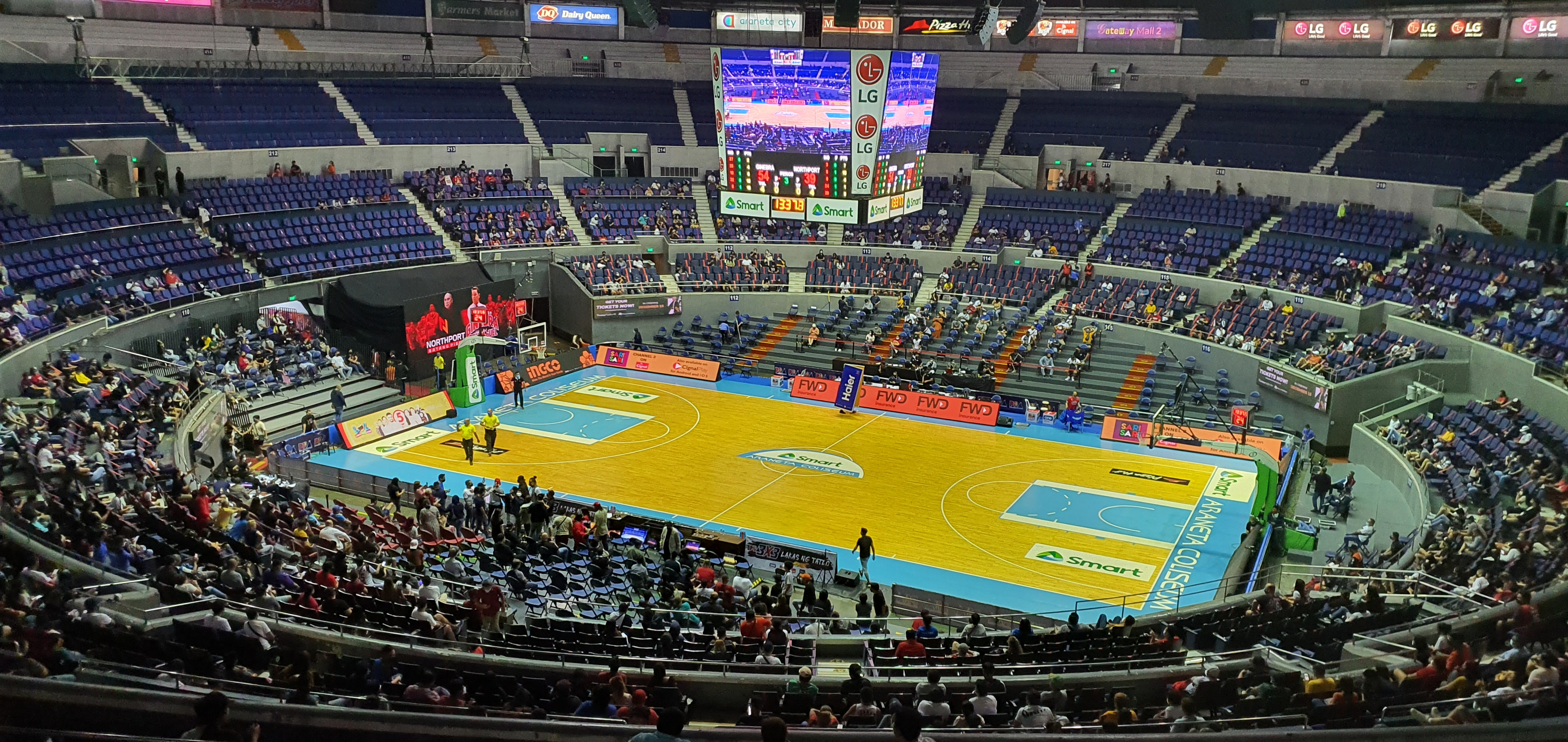
The Araneta Coliseum during the 2021 PBA Governors' Cup basketball game between the Barangay Ginebra San Miguel and the NorthPort Batang Pier.

Araneta Coliseum, along with SM Mall of Asia Arena, is the primary venue of the Philippine Basketball Association (PBA) and the University Athletic Association of the Philippines (UAAP) basketball.

It annually hosts every PBA basketball championship and NCAA basketball championship, as well as the regular season and off-season opening games and championships of UAAP Basketball, UNTV Cup, and Maharlika Pilipinas Basketball League.

The SEABA U16 Championship on May 14 to 18, 2017 and 2017 SEABA Championship on May 15 to 21, 2017 were held in the arena, where the Philippines won their 4th SEABA U-16 and 8th SEABA title.

==== FIBA World Cups ====
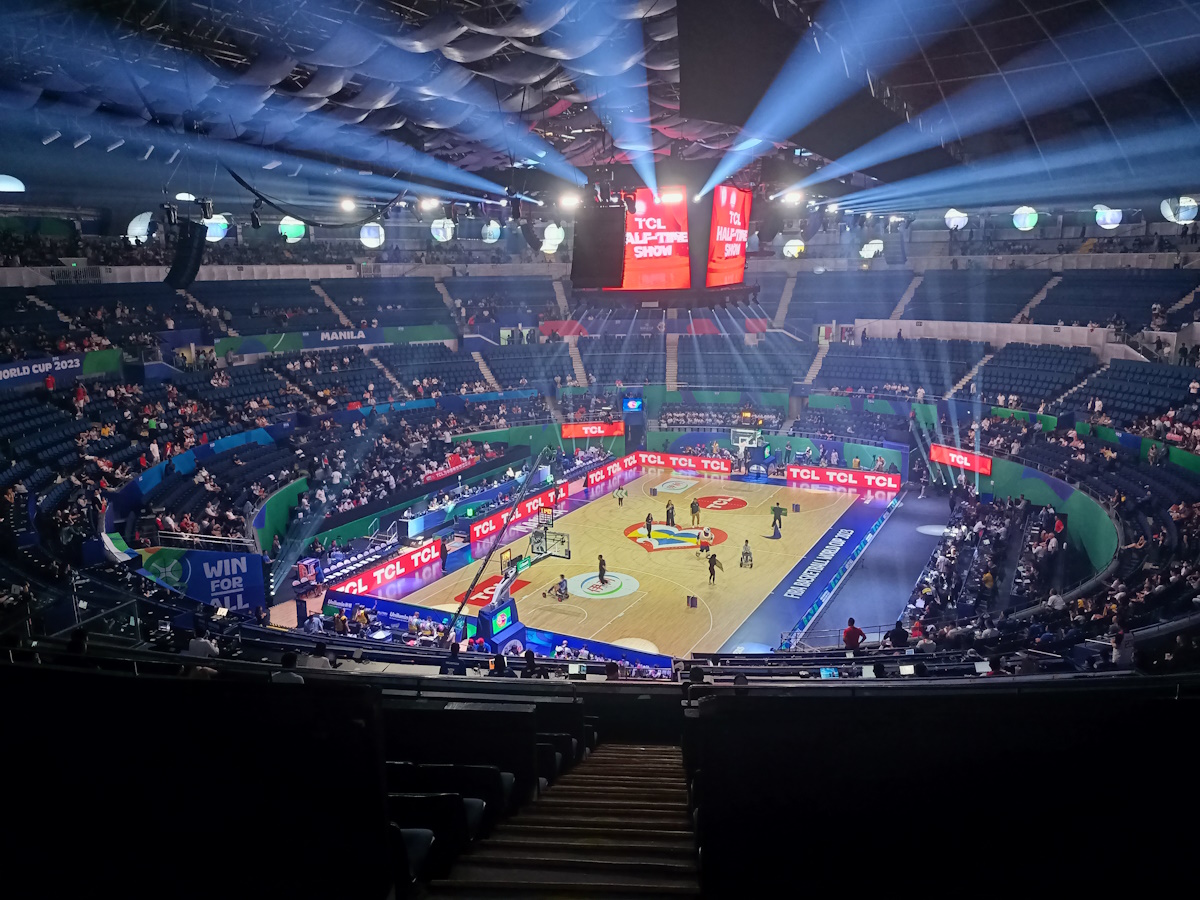
Araneta Coliseum during the 2023 FIBA World Cup

The first FIBA Basketball World Cup (previously called FIBA World Championship) held in Asia was the 1978 FIBA World Championship in the Philippines from October 1 to 14, 1978. The arena was one of the two venues, alongside Rizal Memorial Coliseum, and was the venue for the final round.

It was also one of the venues for the 2023 FIBA Basketball World Cup, which was co-hosted by the Philippines from August 25 to September 10, 2023. The tournament's final draw was held at the Coliseum on April 29, 2023. The arena hosted the first and 17th–32nd classification rounds. Except for the opening game, which was held at the Philippine Arena, the Coliseum hosted all of the Philippine national team's games during the 2023 World Cup.

===== Qualifiers =====
The arena has hosted qualifying events for the FIBA Basketball World Cups. It hosted some matches for the first round of the 2023 FIBA Basketball World Cup qualification for the FIBA Asia-Oceania in February 2022.

=== Boxing ===
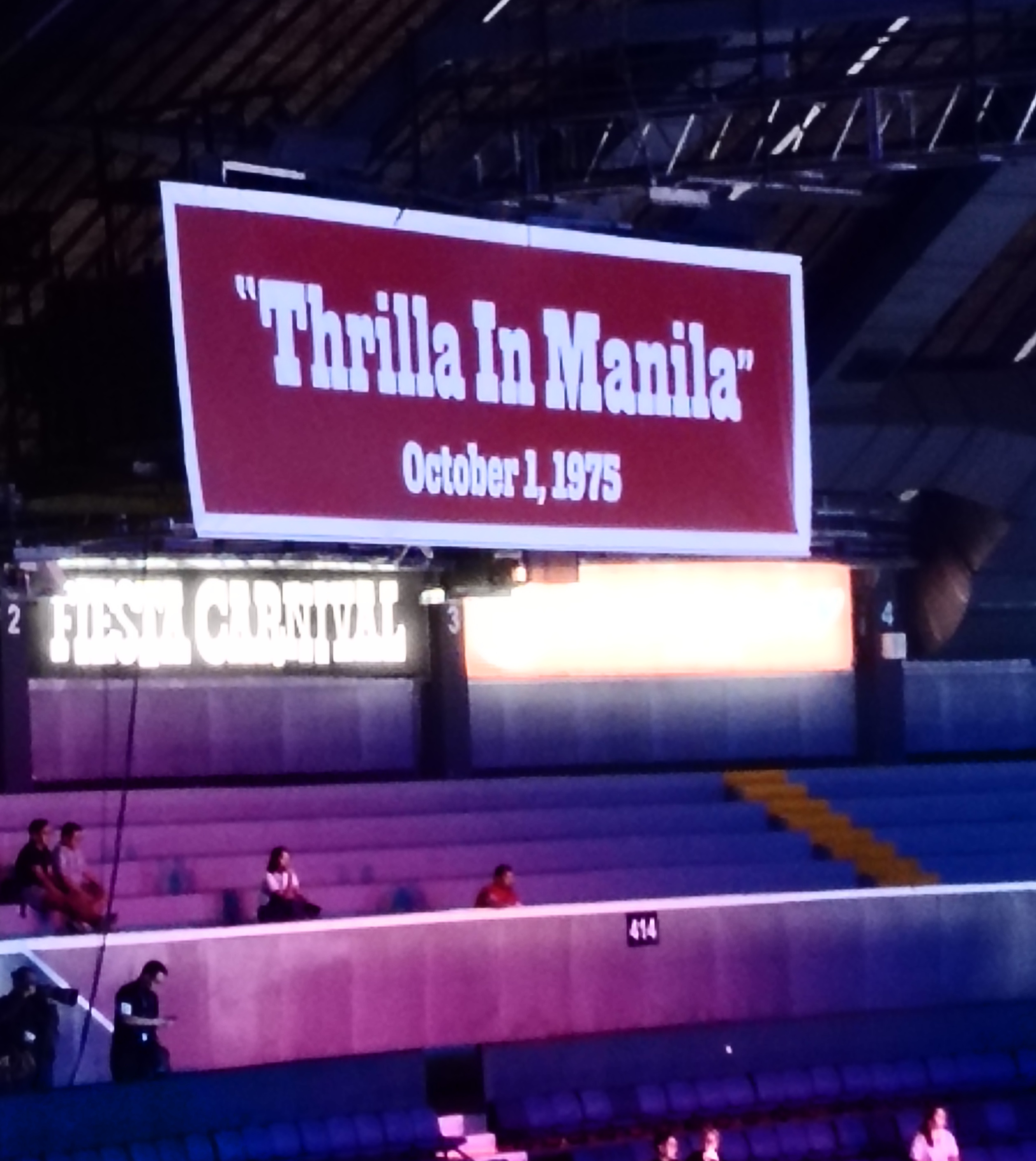
Tarpaulin sign commemorating the Thrilla in Manila.

March 16, 1960, A match between champion Harold Gomes and challenger Gabriel "Flash" Elorde is a defining moment in boxing history. Elorde won the NBA Super featherweight title by knocking out (KO) Gomes in the 7th round and it was attended by a crowd of around nearly 30,000. Elorde's victory was marked a significant achievement in the country's boxing history. The fight is remembered for its thrilling action and the impact it had on the sport and the Filipino boxing community.

October 1, 1975 The arena, which was temporarily renamed to "Philippine Coliseum" for the event, was the venue of the Thrilla in Manila, the 1975 World Heavyweight Championship boxing match between Muhammad Ali and Joe Frazier. It was the third and final match of the three-bout rivalry between the two boxers. Ali won by corner retirement (RTD) after Frazier's chief second asked the referee to stop the fight after the 14th round. The bout is universally regarded as one of the best and most brutal fights in boxing history. It was reportedly watched by a total of 1 billion viewers, and by 50,000 people inside the arena, breaching the venue's total design capacity of 36,000 people.

=== Volleyball ===
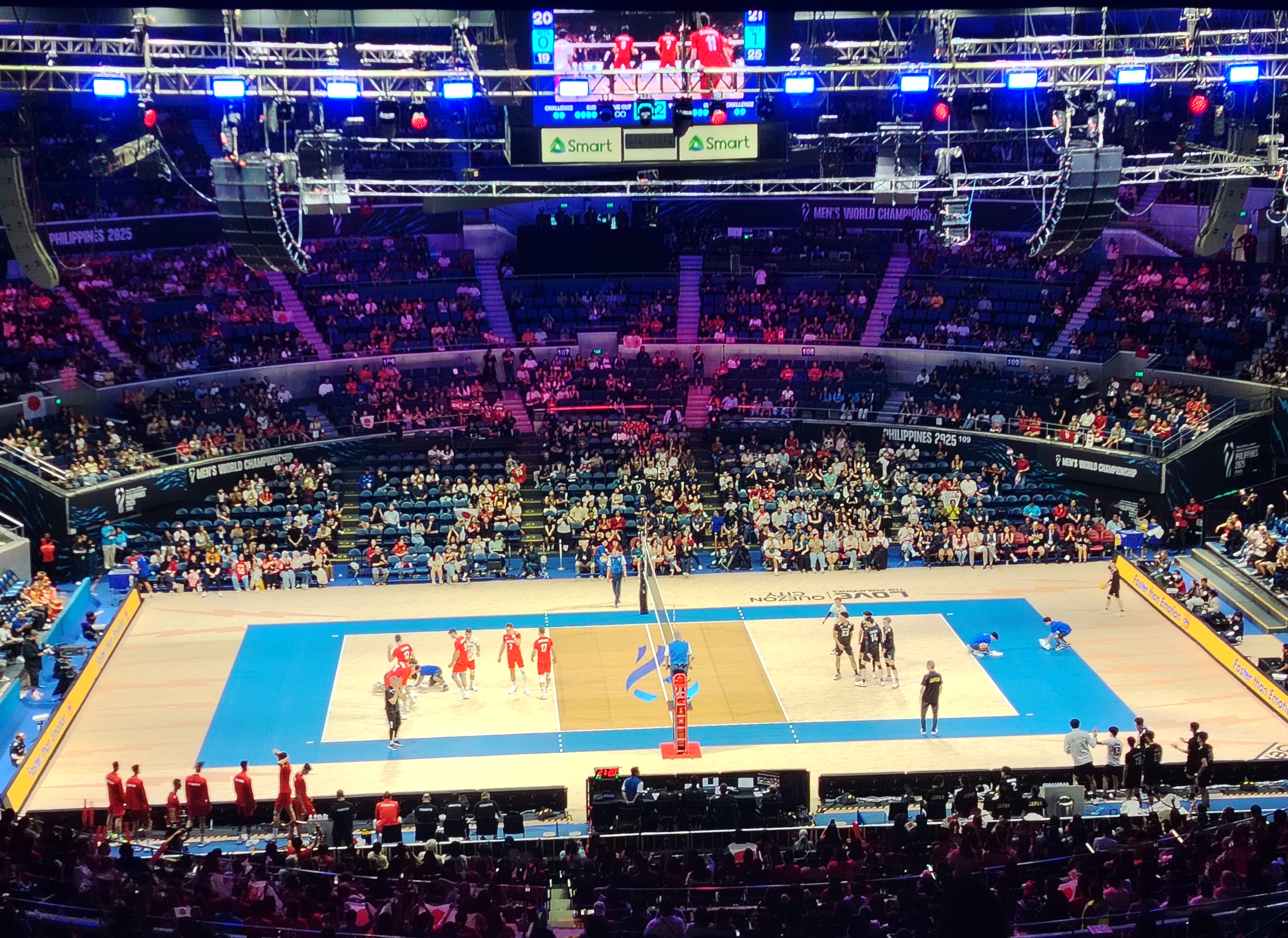
Turkey vs. Japan during the 2025 FIVB Men's Volleyball World Championship.

Araneta Coliseum regularly hosts the UAAP Volleyball championships. It is one of the four primary venue for the Premier Volleyball League along with Filoil EcoOil Centre, PhilSports Arena, and Mall of Asia Arena.

Quezon City was one of the host cities for the 2022 FIVB Volleyball Women's Nations League preliminary round, with the arena hosting the pool 4 matches of the tournament from June 14 to 19, and the 2022 FIVB Volleyball Men's Nations League preliminary round pool 3 matches from June 21 to 26.

=== Entertainment events ===
The coliseum also hosts other type of events including concerts, graduation ceremonies, seminars, ice shows, circuses, and beauty pageants.

From 1990 until 2016, the coliseum hosted Disney on Ice productions during the holiday season; since 2016, SM Arena Mall of Asia in Pasay began hosting these productions.

During its early years in the 1960s, international acts who have performed at the coliseum included Holiday on Ice, Harlem Globetrotters, Nat King Cole, Johnny Mathis, Neil Sedaka, Jo Ann Campbell, Ricky Nelson, Paul Anka, The Ventures, The Everly Brothers, The Dave Clark Five, and The Zombies.

==== Music concerts ====
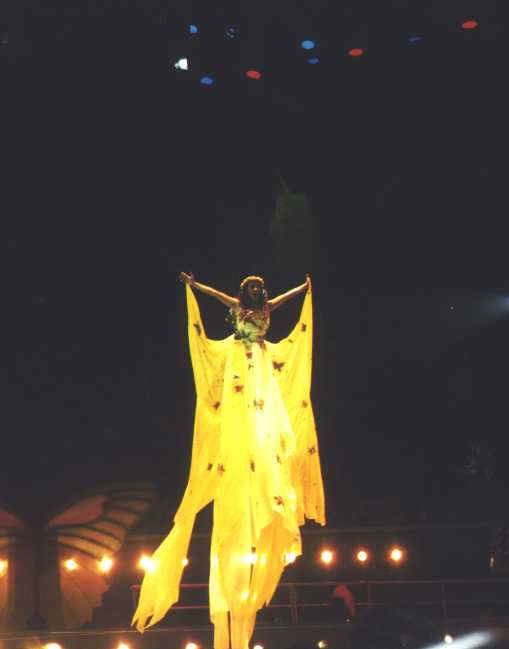
Regine Velasquez during her R2K: The Concert at the coliseum in 2000.

Some notable international performers include [[Bon Jovi] in 1995, Air Supply in 2008, Akon on July 4, 2009, Kelly Clarkson as part of her All I Ever Wanted World Tour on May 1, 2010, Incubus in 2008 and 2011, Carly Rae Jepsen in 2013 and 2015, Lady Gaga as part of her The Fame Ball Tour on August 11, 2009, Avril Lavigne as part of her The Best Damn Tour on September 3, 2008, The Black Star Tour on February 16, 2012 and the Avril Lavigne On Tour on February 17, 2014, Kylie Minogue as part of her Aphrodite: Les Folies Tour on July 5, 2011, Bruno Mars as part of his The Doo-Wops & Hooligans Tour on April 8, 2011, The Script (in 2011 and 2013), Snow Patrol (on August 9, 2012), Taylor Swift as part of her Speak Now Tour on February 19, 2011, and Westlife in 2001, 2006, 2011, 2019, and 2023. as well as the American Idols LIVE! Tour 2011 (on September 21 and 22, 2011), and the American Idols LIVE! Tour 2012 (on September 21, 2012). Following her performance with the American Idols LIVE! Tour 2012 five months prior, Filipino-American American Idol runner-up Jessica Sanchez had her first sold-out solo concert at the coliseum on February 14, 2013. American singer-songwriter Lauv performed at the coliseum as part of his How I'm Feeling tour on May 20, 2019. Additionally, Lauv also premiered his new single, "Sad Forever", and filmed its music video during the concert.

The coliseum also housed K-pop artists like Super Junior's Super Show—the first Korean to perform in the arena, 2NE1, SS501, CNBLUE, Beast and EXO. K-pop group U-KISS also had their concert at the big dome and later released into a concert DVD dubbed as U-KISS 1st Kiss Tour in Manila DVD. It was the first time that an international artist released a concert DVD featuring the coliseum. GOT7's first fan meeting in Manila was also held in the Coliseum on November 14, 2015.

At the turn of the new millennium, Regine Velasquez held her two-night sold-out concert entitled R2K: The Concert, in support of her album R2K, on April 7 and 8, 2000. R2K The Concert became the most attended concert at the coliseum with over 37,000 attendees, was center staged and has used the seating capacity to its 360-degree maximum.

Filipina female supergroup DIVAS, which is composed of Kyla, Yeng Constantino, KZ Tandingan and Angeline Quinto staged two concerts at the Araneta: their first concert titled DIVAS Live in Manila, and another one in 2018 with Boyz II Men titled Boyz II Men with DIVAS.

In 2018, Sarah Geronimo held her 15th showbiz anniversary concert called "This Is Me" stylized as "This 15 Me" at the Araneta Coliseum on April 14. The sold-out concert was reported as the highest-grossing concert at the coliseum.

To date, the TNT BOYS are the youngest performers to stage a concert in the Coliseum between the ages of 12 and 14 with their Listen: The Big Shot Concert held on November 30.

In 2024, P-pop girl group BINI held a 3-day concert at the venue on November 16, 18, & 19. – with day 2 being rescheduled to November 19 from its original November 17 date due to Super Typhoon Pepito. They became the first Filipino OPM P-Pop group performers to hold a 3-day sold-out concert, which had them awarded the Araneta Coliseum Golden Dome Award by the Araneta family.

In 2025, TJ Monterde held "SARILI NATING MUNDO AT THE BIG DOME" on February 1, 2 and 3. – day 3 added due to demand.

In the following weekend, Cup of Joe held "SILAKBO", their second headlining concert and their first concert in the Coliseum on February 9 and 10. The concert was promoting their debut studio album titled Silakbo.

American rapper and producer Tyler, the Creator held his last two days of his "Chromakopia: The World Tour" in the Coliseum in September 20 and 21, with American hip-hop duo Paris Texas for the opening act.

Cup of Joe held their third major solo concert titled "Stardust", originally a two-day event from October 10 and 11 but due to high demand, they added October 12. They were also the first OPM band to reach five sold out days in the Big Dome within a single year.

In 2026, TJ Monterde and KZ Tandingan held their duo concert titled "In Between – Live at the Big Dome" on February 6–9, all days sold out.

In the same month, Rob Deniel held "The Rob Deniel Show" his first major solo concert on February 27.

In August, Yeng Constantino held "Biyaheng Bente - 20th anniversary concert" in the Coliseum on August 28 and 29, all days sold out. They added a third and fourth show on November 17 and 18 with the third day being sold out during ticket selling, which they added the fourth show that also sold out.

In October, Ben&Ben held their fourth major solo concert and second time in the Coliseum on October 2 with a concert entitled; "Sarrangola: The Concert". This is also the last concert drummer Jam Villanueva will be in before leaving the band.

Air Supply took the stage on October 26 for their "A Matter of Time Tour" with them also having a stop in Ilagan City.

In December, Cup of Joe will host "Cup of Joe: Symphony" their fifth major solo concert and third concert in the Big Dome with a sold-out show on December 3 and a newly added date on the next day. This is the last stop on their 'Sandali Sessions' gig tour which started in late July.

==== Pageants ====
The arena has been the venue of the Binibining Pilipinas pageants annually since its inception in 1964. Mister World 2019 was also held on August 23, 2019, at the arena, the first time the Philippines hosted the pageant.

==== Other entertainment events ====
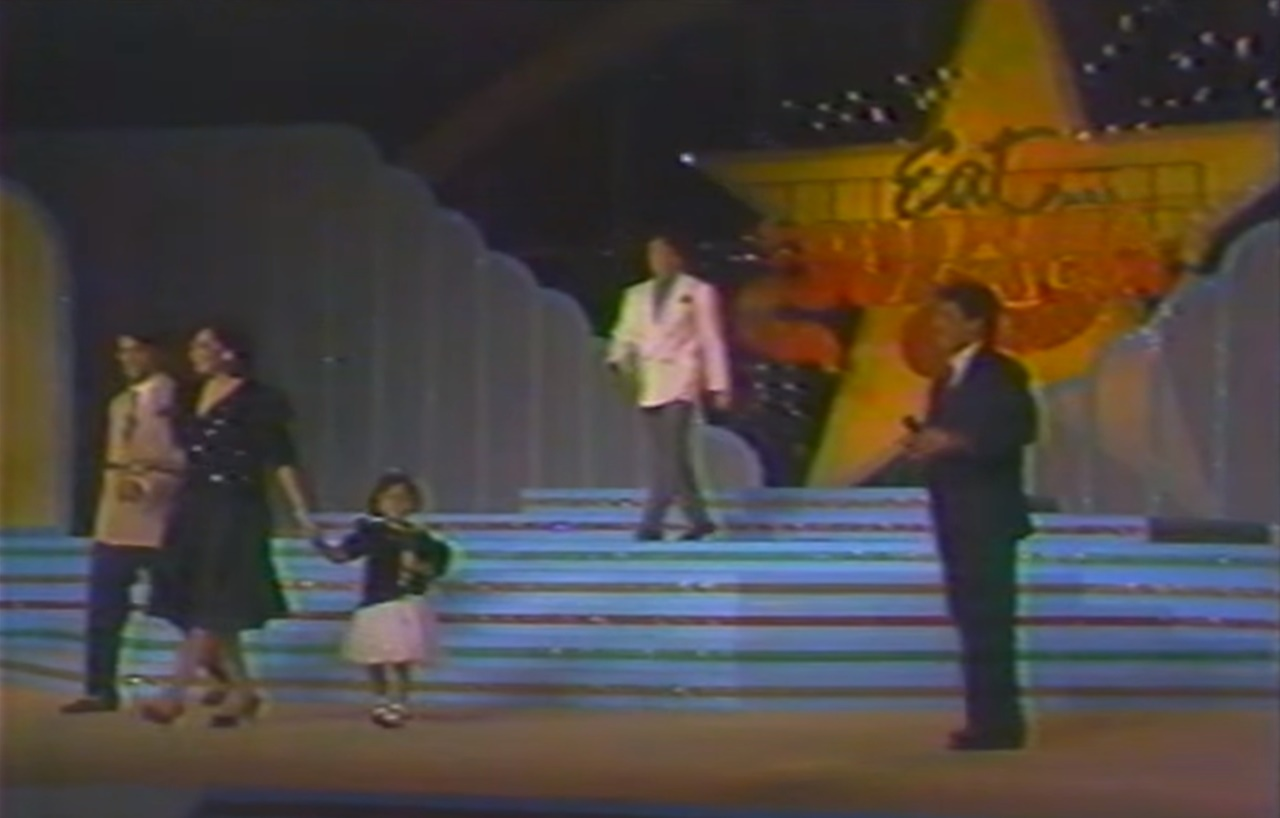
Eat... Bulaga!: Moving On on February 18, 1989

- Noontime show Eat Bulaga! also used the coliseum for some special events such as its TV special Eat... Bulaga!: Moving On on February 18, 1989, and its 10th anniversary on September 23, 1989, in ABS-CBN and Eat...Bulaga!: The Moving held on January 28, 1995, on its new home, GMA Network.
- Musical variety show ASAP. which originally aired on ABS-CBN, was launched on February 5, 1995. This show used the coliseum for some special events such as its 2nd anniversary show, which was held on February 9, 1997.
- It also serves as a venue for different reality show finales, including Pinoy Big Brother, Pilipinas Got Talent, Philippine Idol, Starstruck, and Artista Academy (which held its one-time grand audition at the coliseum).
- The Coliseum is also home to the annual ABS-CBN Christmas special since 2008, which is typically held on the second Tuesday of December, except in 2014 (due to Typhoon Ruby) and 2020, 2021 and 2022 due to the COVID-19 pandemic in the Philippines.
- The Coliseum has hosted the A Song of Praise Music Festival (ASOP) Grand Finals Night from 2012 to 2017, and the Wish 107.5 Music Awards (WMA) annually every January since 2016 (except in 2020 where it was held in the Mall of Asia Arena instead). However, as the coronavirus pandemic began to spread across the country in early 2020, events across the Araneta were postponed/cancelled to prevent further spread of the disease. The venue later resumed hosting events through the 6th Wish 107.5 Music Awards. However, due to the protocols imposed by the Inter-Agency Task Force for the Management of Emerging Infectious Diseases, the event was held without any live audience.
- The Coliseum has hosted a TV5's Christmas special titled Merry ang Vibes ng Pasko: The MVP Group Christmas Party on December 12, 2024.
- The Coliseum annually hosts the PPOPCON, a music fan convention and concert that celebrates Pinoy pop music and culture.

=== Religious events ===
The Big Dome also hosted a praise and worship concerts like Israel Houghton, Parachute Band, Don Moen, Bethel Music, Hillsong Worship, Sonicflood, Planetshakers, Planetboom, Hillsong Young & Free and Hillsong UNITED. Starting 2017, The Annual Planetshakers Conference is being held at the coliseum.

The Big Dome is also the venue of religious gatherings like the anniversary celebration of Ang Dating Daan (English: The Old Path, the flagship program of the Members Church of God International), Christ's Commission Fellowship, Iglesia ni Cristo, International Convention of Pentecostal Missionary Church of Christ (4th Watch), The Church of Jesus Christ of Latter-day Saints in the Philippines, Jesus Is Lord Church Worldwide, Jesus Miracle Crusade, Kingdom of Jesus Christ: The Name Above Every Name (during early years), Shalom CCFI (Every Holy Week), the Special Assembly of Jehovah's Witnesses and Victory Christian Fellowship.

=== Other ===
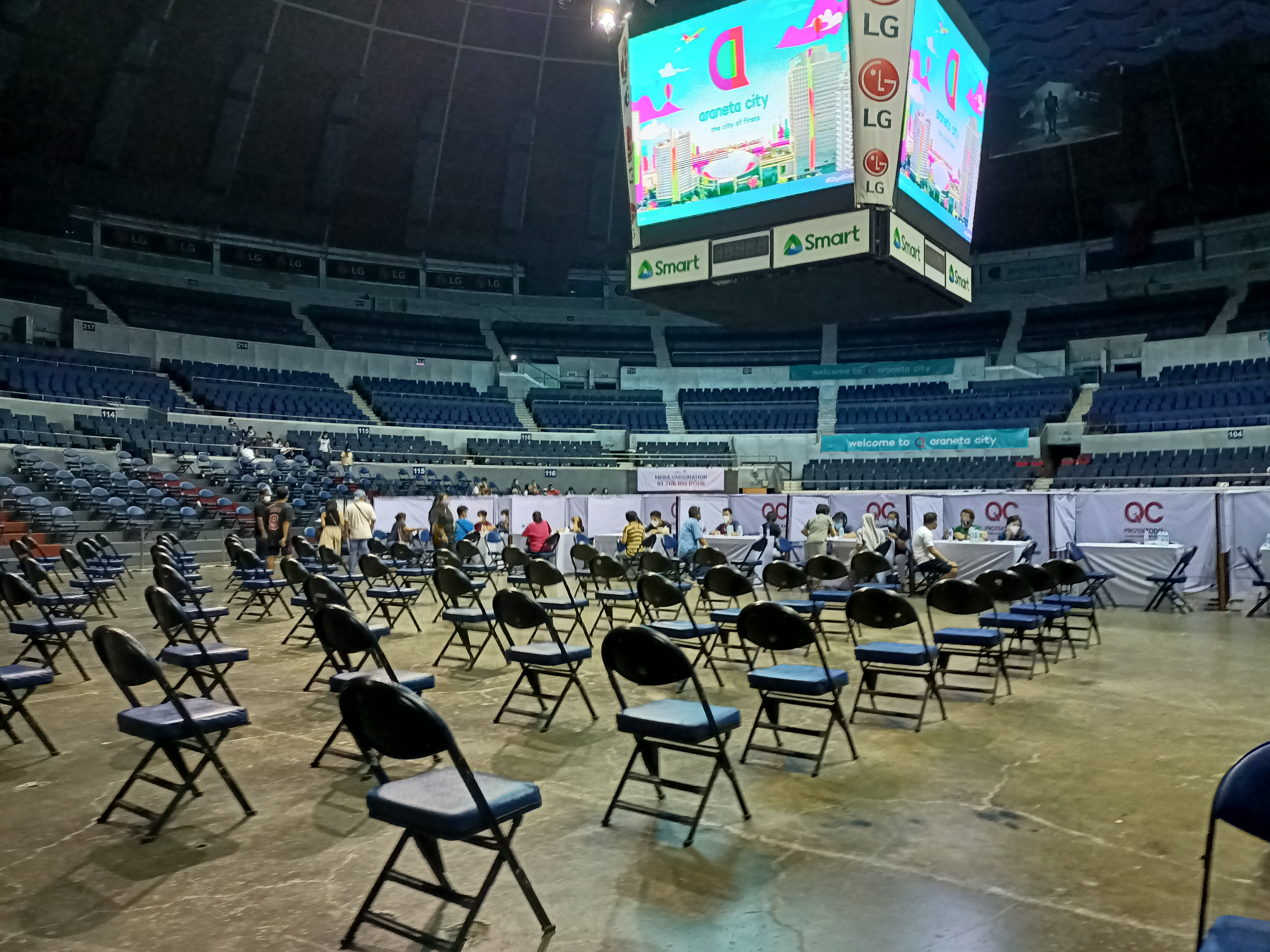
Araneta Coliseum as a vaccination site during the COVID-19 pandemic.

- On October 12, 2014, the main celebration of the 75th Diamond Anniversary of Quezon City led by Mayor Herbert Bautista was held at the coliseum.
- On May 1, 2022, Labor Day, a rally was held at the coliseum organized by supporters of Vice President Leni Robredo and Senator Francis Pangilinan. This was part of their campaign as president and vice president, respectively for the 2022 Philippine presidential election.
- The Coliseum was used as a vaccination center for the rollout of the Quezon City Vaccination Drive against the COVID-19 pandemic, capable of vaccinating 1,000 to 1,500 people daily. The vaccination center began its operations on May 15, 2021, and it is also one of the largest vaccination sites in the country.

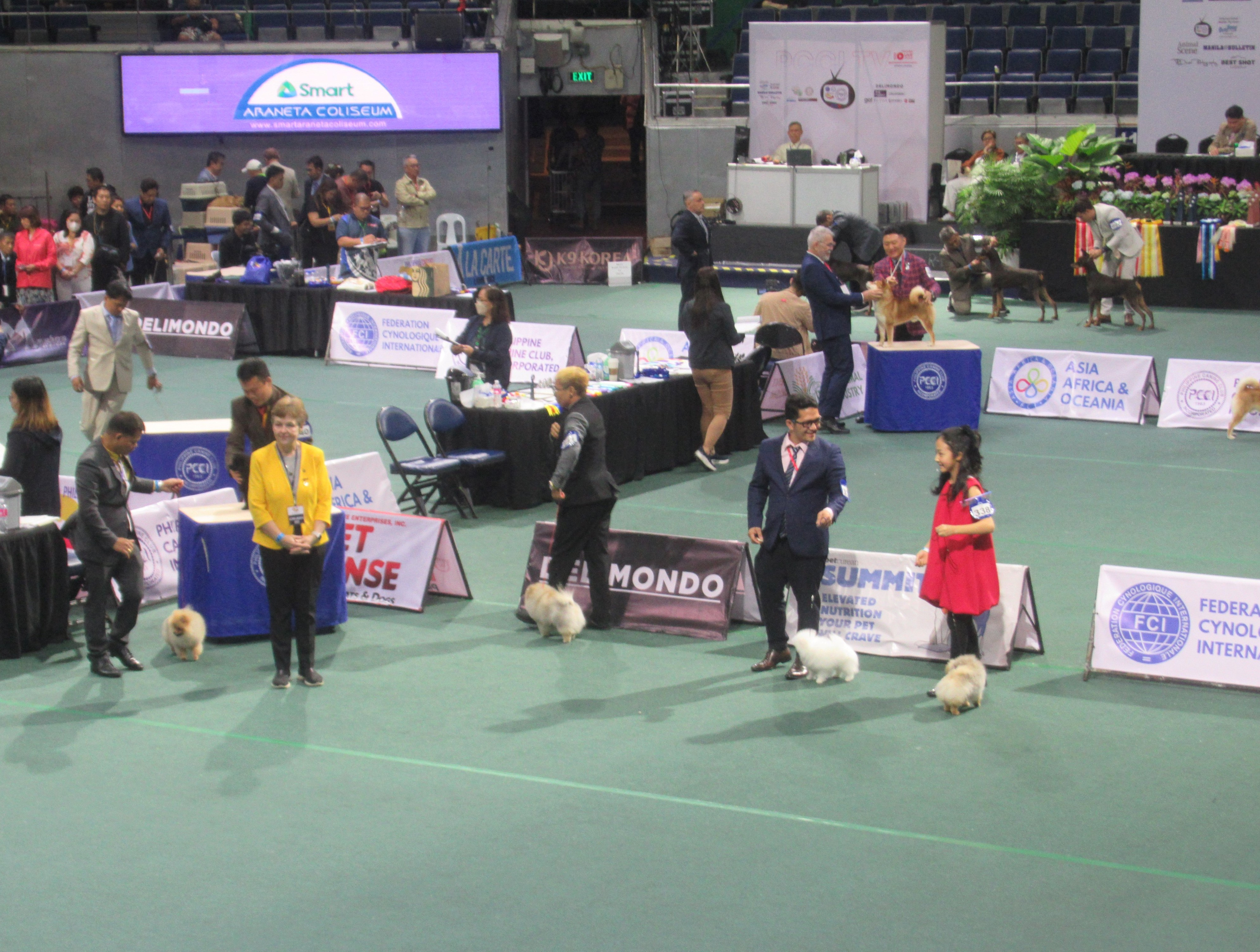
Philippine Circuit 2024, a dog show held on January 17–21, 2024

- The arena hosted the Philippine Circuit 2024 (January 17–21, 2024), Asia's biggest dog show by the Philippine Canine Club, Inc., with 16 judges and 13 bests in show. The club's president Augusto Benedicto Santos III said "around 300 foreign dogs from different countries in Asia and Europe joined the dog show". It also formally introduced the Philippine Forest Dog or "Asong Gubat," (Irog, Mayumi and Muty) which the Club "hoped will be the first dog breed from the Philippines that will be recognized by the Fédération Cynologique Internationale."

== Attendance records ==
During its opening on March 16, 1960, the boxing match between Gabriel "Flash" Elorde and Harold Gomes garnered a full capacity of 36,000 people who viewed the match live, yet the total number of people who visited the coliseum and wanted to purchase tickets totaled to around 50,000 people. The same scenario occurred on October 1, 1975, when the Thrilla in Manila took place. The Coliseum was filled with more than 36,000 people despite the hot and humid temperatures.

In between the renovations done in 1999 and 2014, the seventh game of the 2013–14 PBA Philippine Cup semifinals between Barangay Ginebra San Miguel and San Mig Super Coffee Mixers on February 12, 2014, set the record of 24,883. Later that year and after renovations, the third game of the UAAP Season 77 men's basketball tournament finals between the FEU Tamaraws and NU Bulldogs on October 15, 2014, pushed the basketball attendance record above the 25,000 mark for the first time for any local sporting event in the Philippines, with 25,138 spectators.

The current all-time record attendance for any non-boxing Philippine entertainment event, sports or non-sports, held at the Araneta Coliseum was set during the final game of the UAAP Season 87 men's basketball tournament finals between the UP Fighting Maroons and the De La Salle Green Archers, which was watched live by 25,248 people on December 15, 2024.

Type	Event	Attendance	Date	Ref.
Basketball	UAAP Season 87 men's basketball finals: UP Fighting Maroons vs De La Salle Green Archers	25,248	December 15, 2024	
Boxing (and overall)	Gabriel "Flash" Elorde vs Harold Gomes; Thrilla in Manila: Muhammad Ali vs Joe Frazier	36,000 (est.)	March 16, 1960; October 1, 1975	
Volleyball	2023 PVL Second All-Filipino Conference finals: Creamline Cool Smashers vs Choco Mucho Flying Titans	24,459	December 16, 2023	

== See also ==
- Araneta City

Events
Preceded by Roberto Clemente Coliseum (Puerto Rico) San Juan	FIBA World Championship; Final Venue; 1978	Succeeded by Coliseo El Pueblo (Colombia) Cali
Preceded by University of San Agustin; West Negros University; Puerto Princesa City Coliseum	Host of the PBA All-Star Game; 2001, 2003; 2009; 2016	Succeeded by Cebu Coliseum; Puerto Princesa City Coliseum; Hoops Dome; Quezon Convention Center; Xavier University
