= 2023 Premier Volleyball League Second All-Filipino Conference finals =

Premier Volleyball League championship series

2023 PVL Second All-Filipino Conference finals
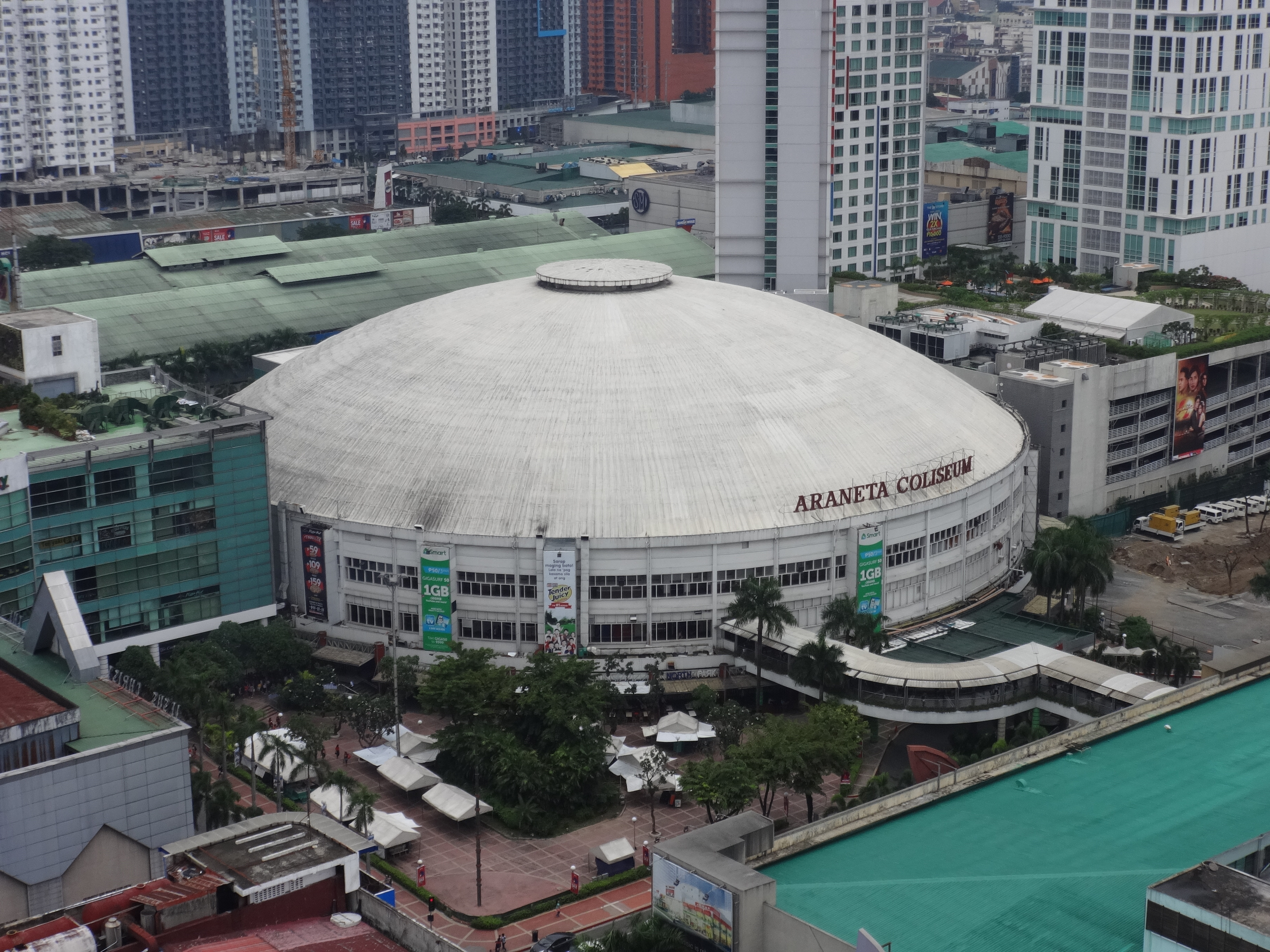
- Smart Araneta Coliseum hosted the second match of the finals with a record attendance.
- Event: 2023 PVL Second All-Filipino Conference
Creamline	Choco Mucho
2	0
Head coach: Sherwin Meneses	Head coach: Dante Alinsunurin

Game 1
Creamline	Choco Mucho
3	1
	1	2	3	4
Creamline	25	19	26	25
Choco Mucho	23	25	24	22
- Date: December 14, 2023
- Venue: SM Mall of Asia Arena, Pasay
- Referees: Herbert Matimatico; Bobby Celso
- Attendance: 8,840
- TV partner(s): One Sports; One Sports+
- Streaming partner(s): Pilipinas Live

Game 2
Choco Mucho	Creamline
2	3
	1	2	3	4	5
Choco Mucho	25	20	27	26	12
Creamline	22	25	29	24	15
- Date: December 16, 2023
- Venue: Smart Araneta Coliseum, Quezon City
- Referees: Fernando Velarde; Erlindo Eusebio
- Attendance: 24,459

The 2023 Premier Volleyball League Second All-Filipino Conference finals was the culminating series of the 2023 Premier Volleyball League Second All-Filipino Conference and the third and final championship series of the Premier Volleyball League's (PVL) 2023 season. In the best-of-three series, the two-time defending All-Filipino Conference champion Creamline Cool Smashers defeated the Choco Mucho Flying Titans in two matches in the first finals meeting between the two sister teams.

It was the fifth All-Filipino Conference title for Creamline and their seventh overall while Choco Mucho finished with their first-ever podium. Creamline's Tots Carlos, who led the team in scoring in both matches, won Finals Most Valuable Player. The series began on December 14 and ended on December 16.

The second match of the series was played with a recorded attendance of 24,459 at Smart Araneta Coliseum, making it the highest-attended match in Philippine volleyball to date.

== Background ==
=== General ===
The Premier Volleyball League normally hosts three types of tournaments, known locally as conferences, which are held once per season. One of them was the Reinforced Conference, which allowed teams to recruit a foreign player to compete throughout the duration of the tournament. A Reinforced Conference was scheduled for the 2023 season, but was instead replaced by a second All-Filipino Conference, which only allows Filipino players or players with Filipino heritage to compete.

The Creamline Cool Smashers were one of the league's founding teams, having joined in 2017. The team is owned by the Republic Biscuit Corporation, better known as Rebisco, and had a streak of three consecutive titles from 2018 to 2019. Midway through the 2019 season, Rebisco established a second team, the Choco Mucho Flying Titans. Since then, the two sister teams would go on to become among the league's most popular with matches between the two teams recording high attendance figures. Despite that, Creamline won all nine matches against Choco Mucho leading up to this finals series, making it a one-sided rivalry.

=== Creamline Cool Smashers ===
The Creamline Cool Smashers entered the conference coming off a loss to Japanese team Kurashiki Ablaze in the 2023 Invitational Conference. The team also had to adapt to the departure of longtime player Jia de Guzman, who had left to pursue her international club career in Japan.

The team dominated all throughout the preliminary round, finishing with an undefeated 11–0 record and 32 points, only dropping one point to their perennial rival Petro Gazz Angels. This continued into the semifinals, where they swept the Chery Tiggo Crossovers in two matches, not losing a single set, to reach their sixth straight All-Filipino Conference finals and their tenth overall.

=== Choco Mucho Flying Titans ===
Up to this point, the best finish the Choco Mucho Flying Titans were able to achieve was a fourth place finish, but did compete in the 2023 VTV International Women's Volleyball Cup, where the team settled with a third place finish. The team didn't make any changes to their roster or staff during the season break.

The team started the conference with a four-set loss to the Creamline Cool Smashers, but afterwards, they would go on a ten-match winning streak to finish the prelimary round 10–1 with 29 points and the second seed. Their semifinals opponent was the Cignal HD Spikers. In the first match, Choco Mucho blew a 2–0 lead as Cignal took the last three sets to take series advantage. The team would regain their footing in the next two matches to advance to their first-ever finals appearance.

=== Head-to-head match-up ===
October 15, 2023; 7:00 pm	Choco Mucho Flying Titans	1–3	Creamline Cool Smashers	Smart Araneta Coliseum, Quezon City; Attendance: 14,014; Referees: Bobby Celso (PHI), Herbert Matimatico (PHI)
October 15, 2023; 7:00 pm	(18–25, 16–25, 26–24, 21–25); P2			Smart Araneta Coliseum, Quezon City; Attendance: 14,014; Referees: Bobby Celso (PHI), Herbert Matimatico (PHI)
October 15, 2023; 7:00 pm	Scoring leaders			Smart Araneta Coliseum, Quezon City; Attendance: 14,014; Referees: Bobby Celso (PHI), Herbert Matimatico (PHI)
Sisi Rondina (21/84)		Total	Bernadeth Pons (22/73)

== Game summaries ==
=== Game 1 ===
December 14, 2023; 6:00 pm	Creamline Cool Smashers	3–1	Choco Mucho Flying Titans	SM Mall of Asia Arena, Pasay; Attendance: 8,840; Referees: Herbert Matimatico (PHI), Bobby Celso (PHI)
December 14, 2023; 6:00 pm	(25–23, 19–25, 26–24, 25–22); P2			SM Mall of Asia Arena, Pasay; Attendance: 8,840; Referees: Herbert Matimatico (PHI), Bobby Celso (PHI)
December 14, 2023; 6:00 pm	Scoring leaders			SM Mall of Asia Arena, Pasay; Attendance: 8,840; Referees: Herbert Matimatico (PHI), Bobby Celso (PHI)
Tots Carlos (16/61)		Total	Maddie Madayag (18/56)

Creamline overcame a close first set before Choco Mucho even the match at 1–1. The Cool next two sets also ended up being close, but Creamline escaped both to take the series advantage.

=== Game 2 ===
December 16, 2023; 6:00 pm	Choco Mucho Flying Titans	2–3	Creamline Cool Smashers	Smart Araneta Coliseum, Quezon City; Attendance: 24,459; Referees: Fernando Velarde (PHI), Erlindo Eusebio (PHI)
December 16, 2023; 6:00 pm	(25–22, 20–25, 27–29, 26–24, 12–15); P2			Smart Araneta Coliseum, Quezon City; Attendance: 24,459; Referees: Fernando Velarde (PHI), Erlindo Eusebio (PHI)
December 16, 2023; 6:00 pm	Scoring leaders			Smart Araneta Coliseum, Quezon City; Attendance: 24,459; Referees: Fernando Velarde (PHI), Erlindo Eusebio (PHI)
Sisi Rondina (33/121)		Total	Tots Carlos (26/101)

After both teams split the first two sets, they had to endure an extended third set in which Creamline won 29–27 before Choco Mucho fought back in the fourth set, winning 26–24 to force a fifth set. In the final set of the match, Choco Mucho led 6–3 before Creamline regained their momentum for the rest of the set and ultimately winning their seventh title with a 15–12 clincher.

The attendance for the match was 24,459, which broke the record for the highest-attended match in Philippine volleyball, surpassing the previous mark of 22,848 set during the third and final match of UAAP Season 78 women's volleyball tournament between rivals Ateneo Lady Eagles and De La Salle Lady Spikers.

The awarding ceremony was held after this match. Creamline's Tots Carlos was awarded Finals Most Valuable Player.

== Aftermath ==
The record-breaking attendance led to positive reactions from players, coaches, and executives; thanking the fans for their support and the growth of volleyball in the Philippines.

It was the first time Alyssa Valdez clinched a championship at Araneta, reflecting the match as "one of the sweetest memories" of her career. Her teammate Tots Carlos stated that she and Valdez were grateful to play in front of the large crowd, remarking that the crowd cannot be replaced. Choco Mucho player Maddie Madayag also expressed her gratitude to the large crowd while also hoping that volleyball programs can improve to increase the level of competition of the sport. The two head coaches also dialed in with Creamline's Sherwin Meneses stating that volleyball in the Philippines has grown and that the players achieved in delivering a good product to viewers. Dante Alinsunurin, who also coached men's volleyball teams, was surprised to see the large turnout for women's volleyball and hoping that the same success can be replaced for the men's game.

While reflecting on the season as a whole, PVL president Ricky Palou responded with "What can I say?", declaring the 2023 season as "very successful" season and wished that Jun Bernardino and Moying Martelino, two of his partners at Sports Vision who were integral in the league's growth from its roots as the Shakey's V-League, were able to see how far the league has gotten.

The two teams would meet again in the 2024 All-Filipino Conference finals, where the high attendance figures continued with the second match, also held at Araneta, attracting 23,162 fans.
